= 1948–49 CA Oradea season =

ICO Oradea
1948–49 season
- Manager: Nicolae Kovács
- Stadium: Municipal
- Cupa României: Semi-finals

The 1948–49 season was CA Oradea's 26th season, 16th in the Romanian football league system and their 13th season in the Divizia A. In this season the club was known as Întreprinderea Comunală Oradea, ICO Oradea or simply as ICO and managed to obtain the second big performance in the history of the football from Oradea, a Divizia A title. The first title won in Romania and the second title won at club level, after the 1943-44 Nemzeti Bajnokság I, being the first club to succeed to be crowned as both the champion of Romania and Hungary.

== First team squad ==
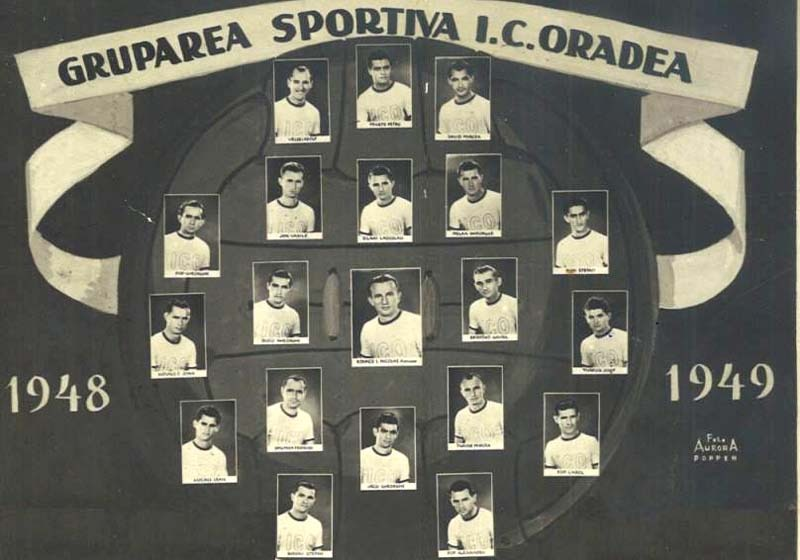
CA Oradea (1948–1949)

Note: Flags indicate national team as defined under FIFA eligibility rules; some limited exceptions apply. Players may hold more than one non-FIFA nationality.

No.	Pos.	Nation	Player
—	GK	(Romania) ROU	Mircea David
—	GK	(Romania) ROU	Petru Fekete
—	GK	(Hungary) HUN	Adolf Vécsey
—	DF	(Romania) ROU	Ștefan Boszacky
—	DF	(Romania) ROU	Gheorghe Pop
—	DF	(Romania) ROU	Vasile Ion
—	DF	(Romania) ROU	Gheorghe Melan
—	MF	(Romania) ROU	Gheorghe Bodo
—	MF	(Romania) ROU	Ștefan Cuc
—	MF	(Romania) ROU	Ladislau Zilahi

No.	Pos.	Nation	Player
—	MF	(Romania) ROU	Gavril Serfözö
—	FW	(Hungary) HUN	János Kovács II
—	FW	(Romania) ROU	Ioan Lucaci
—	FW	(Romania) ROU	Alexandru Pop
—	FW	(Romania) ROU	Carol Pop
—	FW	(Romania) ROU	Francisc Spielmann
—	FW	(Romania) ROU	Mircea Tudose
—	FW	(Romania) ROU	Iosif Turcuș
—	FW	(Romania) ROU	Gheorghe Váczi

== Competitions ==
=== Overview ===
Pos	Team	Pld	W	D	L	GF	GA	GD	Pts	Qualification or relegation
1	ICO Oradea (C)	26	16	5	5	60	36	+24	37	Champions of Romania
2	CFR București	26	14	4	8	61	33	+28	32	
3	Jiul Petroșani	26	11	8	7	44	40	+4	30	
4	RATA Târgu Mureș	26	13	4	9	51	37	+14	30	
5	CFR Timișoara	26	12	6	8	47	30	+17	30	

Source: LT
Rules for classification: 1) points; 2) goal difference; 3) number of goals scored
(C) Champions

==== Result round by round ====
Round	1	2	3	4	5	6	7	8	9	10	11	12	13	14	15	16	17	18	19	20	21	22	23	24	25	26
Ground	H	A	H	A	H	A	H	A	H	A	H	A	H	A	H	A	H	A	H	A	H	A	H	A	H	A
Result	W	W	D	D	W	L	W	W	W	L	W	W	W	W	L	W	W	W	D	L	W	W	D	W	D	L
Position	4	3	4	3	2	4	3	2	1	1	1	1	1	1	1	1	1	1	1	1	1	1	1	1	1	1

Source: labtof.ro
A = Away; H = Home; W = Win; D = Draw; L = Loss

==== Results ====
22 August 1948 1	ICO Oradea	5–2	RATA Târgu Mureș	Oradea
17:00 UTC+3		Report		Stadium: Municipal

=== Cupa României ===
4 September 1949 First round	Electrica Timișoara	1–2 (a.e.t.)	ICO Oradea	Timișoara
				Stadium: Electrica

== See also ==
- 1948–49 Cupa României
- 1948–49 Divizia A
