= József Pecsovszky =

Romanian footballer (1921–1968)

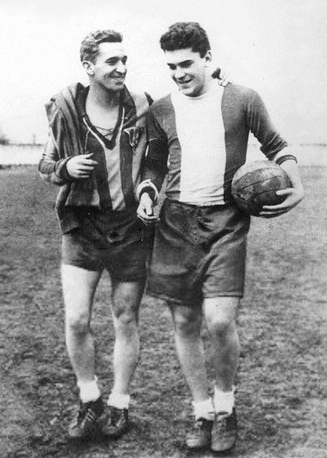
- Pecsovszky (left) with his son after a match in 1961

Personal information
- Date of birth: 2 July 1921
- Place of birth: Timișoara, Romania
- Date of death: 6 October 1968 (aged 47)
- Place of death: Arad, Romania
- Height: 1.68 m (5 ft 6 in)
- Position: Attacking midfielder

Senior career*
Years	Team	Apps	(Gls)
1937–1939	Chinezul Timișoara		
1940	CAM Timișoara	2	(0)
1940–1941	Chinezul Timișoara		
1941–1944	Nagyváradi AC	69	(5)
1944	Vasas	9	(0)
1945	CA Cluj		
1946–1951	ITA Arad	94	(34)
1952–1954	CCA București	50	(19)
1955–1961	UTA Arad (Note: The statistics for the 1957 unofficial championship called Cupa Primăverii are not taken into consideration.)	127	(33)
Total		351	(91)

International career
1942–1943	Hungary	3	(0)
1945–1958	Romania	32	(11)

Managerial career
- 1961–1962: UTA Arad (youth)
- 1962–1963: UTA Arad
- 1963–1965: AS Cugir
- 1965: Minerul Ștei
- 1965–1967: UTA Arad (youth)
- * Club domestic league appearances and goals

József Pecsovszky or Iosif Petschovschi (also known as József Perényi; 2 July 1921 – 6 October 1968) was a Romanian footballer. He won multiple trophies with Nagyváradi AC, UTA Arad and CCA București. He also represented both Hungary and Romania internationally. Upon concluding his playing career, he transitioned into coaching, leading several teams.

== Club career ==
=== Chinezul Timișoara and CAM Timișoara ===
Pecsovszky, nicknamed Ceala, was born on 2 July 1921 in Timișoara, Romania to a Slovak father and a Romanian mother, being part of a family of ten children and growing up in the Iosefin neighborhood. He began playing junior-level football under coach Carol Vanna at age 13 at local club Chinezul. At age 16, he made his senior debut in a Divizia B match against Ripensia Timișoara. In 1940, he moved to CAM Timișoara, making his Divizia A debut on 2 June 1940 in a 4–1 win over Rapid București. Subsequently, he returned to Chinezul.

=== Nagyváradi AC, Vasas and CA Cluj ===
In 1942, Pecsovszky moved to Nagyváradi AC, making his Nemzeti Bajnokság I debut on 22 February under coach Ferenc Rónay in a 7–1 home victory against MÁVAG. He scored his first goal in the competition on 28 March 1943 in a 3–2 win over Kolozsvár AC. During the 1943–44 season, Pecsovszky played 22 matches, scoring two goals in victories against Debrecen and Budapesti Elektromos, which helped Nagyváradi AC win the championship under coach Rónay. In 1944, he went to play for Vasas. There, he made his last Nemzeti Bajnokság I appearance on 13 December 1944 in a 2–0 win over BSZKRT, totaling 78 matches with five goals in the competition. Subsequently, he joined CA Cluj. In 1946, a Hungarian footballer tried to steal Pecsovszky's identity by recommending himself as Pecsovszky in order to sign a contract with RC Strasbourg of France.

=== UTA Arad and CCA București ===
Pecsovszky signed with ITA Arad in 1946. In his first season he worked with three coaches, Zoltán Opata, Zoltán Blum and Gusztáv Juhász, who gave him 22 matches in which he scored a career-best 12 goals, as the team won the first title in its history. In the following season he helped The Old Lady win The Double, playing 15 league games with three goals scored under coach Petre Steinbach and appearing the entire match under coach Gusztáv Juhász in the 3–2 victory against CFR Timișoara in the 1948 Cupa României final. Sometime in 1948 or 1949, after the goalkeeper of his team got injured during a match against Gaz Metan Mediaș, Pecsovszky took his place in the goalpost. In the 1950 season, he won another title with the club, contributing with five goals in 16 matches under coach Francisc Dvorzsák, also appearing in the Cupa României final which was lost 3–1 to CCA București.

In 1952, Pecsovszky moved to CCA București and in his first season, he scored nine goals in 21 league appearances under coach Gheorghe Popescu to help the team win The Double. During the same season, he also scored a goal in a 3–2 victory against rivals Dinamo București in the Cupa României semi-finals. Subsequently, he played the full 90 minutes in the 2–0 win over Flacăra Ploiești in the final. In the 1953 season, Pecsovszky played 10 matches and scored three goals under coaches Popescu and Ferenc Rónay, as the team won another championship. Furthermore, CCA reached another Cupa României final, where he played the entire match in the 1–0 loss to his former club, UTA Arad.

In 1955, Pecsovszky returned to UTA. There, he made his last Divizia A appearance on 11 June 1961 in a 3–1 loss to Steagul Roșu Brașov, totaling 273 matches with 86 goals in the competition. Among these goals, five were scored for UTA in the West derby against Politehnica Timișoara, contributing to two victories, one draw and one loss for his side.

== International career ==
=== Hungary ===
Pecsovszky played three friendly games for Hungary, making his debut on 1 November 1942 under coach Kálmán Vághy in a 3–0 home win over Switzerland. His following match was a 3–1 away success against the same opponent. Pecsovszky's last game for The Magyars took place on 6 June 1943 in a 4–2 away victory against Bulgaria.

=== Romania ===
Pecsovszky switched allegiance to Romania and made his debut on 30 September 1945 under coach Coloman Braun-Bogdan in a 7–2 friendly loss to his former team Hungary in which he scored once. Subsequently, he played three matches in the 1946 Balkan Cup and two during the 1947 edition, managing to score once in a 3–2 win over Bulgaria in the latter campaign. He also played three matches in the 1948 Balkan Cup, scoring once in a 5–1 loss to Hungary. Pecsovszky was suspended in October 1947 for a period of three months because before an international game between Romania and Poland, he bet on the Polish team.

Pecsovszky was selected by coach Gheorghe Popescu to play in the 1952 Summer Olympics, captaining his side in the 2–1 loss in the first round against eventual champions Hungary. Afterwards, he played four matches and netted a brace in a 3–2 win over Bulgaria in the 1954 World Cup qualifiers. During the 1958 World Cup qualifiers, he made three appearances and scored once in a 3–0 victory against Greece. Pecsovszky's last match for Romania took place on 14 September 1958 in a 3–2 friendly loss to East Germany, totaling 32 matches with 11 goals for The Tricolours.

== Managerial career ==
Pecsovszky began his coaching career in 1961 at UTA Arad's youth center. One year later, he became the coach of the club's main squad, leading them for a significant period during the 1962–63 Divizia A season. In the following years, he coached teams in the Romanian lower leagues such as AS Cugir and Minerul Ștei. Pecsovszky's last coaching spell was from 1965 to 1967 at UTA's youth center.

== Style of play ==
Aristide Buhoiu wrote a book about him titled "Petschovschi" in which he described the player's style of play as follows: "He was delightful. He struck the ball flawlessly with both feet, leapt for headers like a high jumper, thought quickly, and whenever he took matters into his own hands, the goalkeeper might as well have written his will."

== Personal life ==
Pecsovszky's sons, Iosif and Ladislau, were also footballers and both of them played for Gloria Arad and Strungul Arad. In 1961, Pecsovszky briefly played alongside Iosif at UTA Arad. An uncle of Pecsovszky's played for UDR Reșița.

== Death and legacy ==
Pecsovszky died of cancer on 6 October 1968 at age 47 in his home in Arad. His funeral was attended by more than 5,000 people.

His former club, UTA Arad, dedicated a statue in his honor, located at the main entrance of the Francisc von Neuman Stadium. His name is mentioned in the club's anthem titled "De la Dunăre la Sena" (From the Danube to the Seine). In 2008, the Arad County Council posthumously named Pecsovszky Honorary Citizen of the county.

== Career statistics ==
Appearances and goals by national team and year
National team	Year	Apps	Goals
Hungary	1942	1	0
Hungary	1943	2	0
Total		3	0
Romania	1945	1	1
Romania	1946	3	0
Romania	1947	4	1
Romania	1948	3	1
Romania	1949	4	3
Romania	1950	1	2
Romania	1951	1	0
Romania	1952	4	0
Romania	1953	4	2
Romania	1954	0	0
Romania	1955	3	0
Romania	1956	0	0
Romania	1957	3	1
Romania	1958	1	0
Total		32	11

Romania score listed first, score column indicates score after each Pecsovszky goal.

List of international goals scored by József Pecsovszky for Romania
No.	Date	Venue	Opponent	Score	Result	Competition
1	30 September 1945	Üllői úti stadion, Budapest, Hungary	Hungary	2–5	2–7	Friendly
2	6 July 1947	Yunak Stadium, Sofia, Bulgaria	Bulgaria	2–1	3–2	1947 Balkan Cup
3	24 October 1948	Stadionul Republicii, Bucharest, Romania	Hungary	1–4	1–5	1948 Balkan Cup
4	8 May 1949	Stadionul Republicii, Bucharest, Romania	Poland	1–0	2–1	Friendly
5	8 May 1949	Stadionul Republicii, Bucharest, Romania	Poland	2–0	2–1	Friendly
6	23 October 1949	Stadionul Republicii, Bucharest, Romania	Albania	1–0	1–1	Friendly
7	8 October 1950	Stadionul Republicii, Bucharest, Romania	Albania	1–0	6–0	Friendly
8	8 October 1950	Stadionul Republicii, Bucharest, Romania	Albania	4–0	6–0	Friendly
9	28 June 1953	Stadionul Republicii, Bucharest, Romania	Bulgaria	1–0	3–1	1954 World Cup qualifiers
10	28 June 1953	Stadionul Republicii, Bucharest, Romania	Bulgaria	2–0	3–1	1954 World Cup qualifiers
11	3 November 1957	Stadionul 23 August, Bucharest, Romania	Greece	1–0	3–0	1958 World Cup qualifiers

== Honours ==
Nagyváradi AC

- Nemzeti Bajnokság I: 1943–44

UTA Arad

- Divizia A: 1946–47, 1947–48, 1950
- Cupa României: 1947–48, runner-up 1950

CCA București

- Divizia A: 1952, 1953
- Cupa României: 1952, runner-up 1953
