= 1953 Cupa României final =

- Event: 1953 Cupa României
Flamura Roşie Arad	CCA București
1	0
- Date: 29 November 1953
- Venue: 23 August, Bucharest
- Referee: Mihai Popa (Bucharest)
- Attendance: 50,000

The 1953 Cupa României final was the 16th final of Romania's most prestigious football cup competition. It was disputed between CCA București and Flamura Roşie Arad, and was won by Flamura Roşie Arad after a game with 1 goal, in extra time. It was the second cup for Flamura Roşie Arad after the one from 1947–48 season.

== Match details ==
29 November 1953
12:00 EET

Flamura Roşie Arad	1–0 (a.e.t.)	CCA București
Váczi 110'	Report

23 August, Bucharest
Attendance: 50,000
Referee: Mihai Popa (Bucharest)

GK	1	(Romania) Francisc Kiss (substituted off) 46'
DF	2	(Romania) Gavril Szücs
DF	3	(Romania) Iosif Kapas
DF	4	(Romania) Zoltan Farmati
MF	5	(Romania) Mihai Carpineţ (substituted off) 46'
MF	6	(Romania) Gavril Serfözö
FW	7	(Romania) Nicolae Popa
FW	8	(Romania) Gheorghe Váczi
FW	9	(Romania) Adalbert Kovács
FW	10	(Romania) Andrei Mercea
FW	11	(Romania) Nicolae Dumitrescu
Substitutions:
GK	12	(Romania) M.Popovici (substituted in) 46'
DF	13	(Romania) Gheorghe Lupeş (substituted in) 46'
Manager:
(Romania) Coloman Braun-Bogdan

GK	1	(Romania) Costică Toma
DF	2	(Romania) Vasile Zavoda
DF	3	(Romania) Alexandru Apolzan
DF	4	(Romania) Traian Ivănescu
MF	5	(Romania) Ştefan Onisie
MF	6	(Romania) Tiberiu Bone
FW	7	(Romania) Francisc Zavoda
FW	8	(Romania) Nicolae Tătaru
FW	9	(Romania) Ion Alecsandrescu
FW	10	(Romania) Iosif Petschovski
FW	11	(Romania) Alexandru Karikas (substituted off) 46'
Substitutions:
FW	12	(Romania) Victor Moldovan (substituted in) 46'
Manager:
(Romania) Ilie Savu

== See also ==
- List of Cupa României finals
