= Gheorghe Váczi =

Romanian footballer (1922–2006)

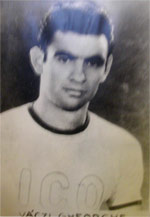
- Váczi in the late 1940s

Personal information
- Date of birth: 4 August 1922
- Place of birth: Mediaș, Romania
- Date of death: 16 October 2006 (aged 84)
- Place of death: Arad, Romania
- Position: Striker

Senior career*
Years	Team	Apps	(Gls)
1938–1940	Vitrometan Mediaș		
1940–1941	Mureșul Târgu Mureș		
1942–1944	Kolozsvári AC	41	(27)
1945–1946	Wacker Wien		
1946	Győri ETO	7	(1)
1946–1947	Ferar Cluj	24	(19)
1947–1952	Progresul Oradea	113	(82)
1953–1954	Flamura Roșie Arad	45	(22)
1955–1958	Progresul Oradea (Note: The statistics for the 1955 Divizia B season are unavailable and the statistics for the 1957 unofficial championship called Cupa Primăverii are not taken into account.)	12	(3)
1958–1959	Arieșul Turda		
1959–1960	Flacăra Mediaș		
1960–1961	Metalul Copșa Mică		
Total		242	(154)

International career
1947–1949	Romania B	3	(1)
1947–1953	Romania	11	(8)

Managerial career
- 1958–1959: Arieșul Turda (player/coach)
- 1959–1960: Flacăra Mediaș (player/coach)
- 1962–1964: Metalul Copșa Mică
- 1964–1968: Minerul Baia de Arieș
- * Club domestic league appearances and goals

Gheorghe Váczi (4 August 1922 – 16 October 2006) was a Romanian footballer who played as a striker. While playing for Progresul Oradea, he finished as the Divizia A top-scorer in the 1948–49 and 1951 seasons.

== Club career ==
Váczi was born on 4 August 1922 in Mediaș, Romania and began playing football in 1938 at local club Vitrometan. In 1940, he went to play for one year at Mureșul Târgu Mureș. Subsequently, he joined Kolozsvári AC, making his Nemzeti Bajnokság I debut on 23 August 1942 under coach Domonkos János, scoring once in a 3–2 home loss to Vasas. He scored 19 goals until the end of the 1942–43 season, including a hat-trick in a 4–0 win over Újvidéki AC. Under coach Zoltán Opata, the team reached the 1943–44 Magyar Kupa final and Váczi played in both legs of the 5–3 aggregate loss to Ferencváros. He moved to Austria in 1945 to play for Wacker Wien. In 1946, he went to play for Győri ETO.

Váczi joined Ferar Cluj, making his Divizia A debut on 25 August 1946 under coach Iuliu Bodola in a 1–0 away loss to Ciocanul București. He netted 19 goals until the end of the 1946–47 season to help his side earn sixth place. In 1947, Váczi moved to Progresul Oradea, where in the 1948–49 season, he played 26 matches and scored 24 goals under coach Nicolae Kovács, which helped the team win the championship and made him the league's top-scorer. He was the Divizia A top-scorer for a second time in the 1951 season with 23 goals netted. In 1953, Váczi went to play for Flamura Roșie Arad. On 4 October 1953, he scored a goal in a 2–0 West derby victory against Politehnica Timișoara. He helped Flamura Roșie win the 1953 Cupa României, playing the entire match under coach Coloman Braun-Bogdan and scoring the only goal in the 1–0 win over CCA București. He then won the 1954 title as the team's top scorer, netting 13 goals in 26 appearances under Braun-Bogdan.

For the 1955 season, Váczi returned to Progresul Oradea, helping the club gain promotion from Divizia B to the first league. During the same season, the team reached the 1955 Cupa României final, but coach Ladislau Zilahi did not use him in the 6–3 loss to CCA București. In the following edition of the Cupa României, Progresul reached the final once again, but coach Camil Schertz could not use Váczi in the 2–0 win over Energia Câmpia Turzii due to an injury. Váczi made his last Divizia A appearance on 1 December 1957 in a 5–0 away loss to Steagul Roșu Brașov, totaling 194 matches with 126 goals in the competition.

From 1958 to 1961, Váczi played for Arieșul Turda, Flacăra Mediaș and Metalul Copșa Mică in the Romanian lower leagues, retiring afterwards.

== International career ==
From 1947 to 1949, Váczi played three matches and scored once for Romania's B team.

Váczi played 11 games and scored eight goals for Romania, making his debut on 26 October 1947 under coach Ferenc Rónay in a 0–0 friendly draw against Poland. In his following match, he scored his first goal in a 3–2 friendly loss to Czechoslovakia. In another exhibition match against the same opponent on 20 May 1951, he netted a brace in a 2–2 draw against Czechoslovakia. Váczi managed to score a hat-trick in a 3–1 friendly victory against East Germany. On 14 June 1953, he made his last appearance for the national team in a 2–0 loss to Czechoslovakia in the 1954 World Cup qualifiers.

== Managerial career ==
Váczi coached teams in the Romanian lower leagues, with his first spell taking place from 1958 to 1959, when he served as player-coach at Arieșul Turda. One year later, he moved in the same dual capacity to lead Flacăra Mediaș. Afterwards, he coached Metalul Copșa Mică and Minerul Baia de Arieș, helping the latter gain promotion to Divizia C.

== Personal life and death ==
His son, Gheorghe Váczi jr., was also a footballer who played in Divizia A for Universitatea Cluj and UTA Arad.

Váczi died on 16 October 2006 at the age of 84 in Arad, Romania.

== Career statistics ==
=== International ===
Appearances and goals by national team and year
National team	Year	Apps	Goals
Romania
Romania	1947	1	0
Romania	1949	3	2
Romania	1950	2	1
Romania	1951	1	2
Romania	1952	3	3
Romania	1953	1	0
Total		11	8

Romania score listed first, score column indicates score after each Váczi goal.

List of international goals scored by Gheorghe Váczi for Romania
No.	Date	Venue	Opponent	Score	Result	Competition
1	22 May 1949	Stadion Československé Armády, Prague, Czechoslovakia	Czechoslovakia	1–0	2–3	Friendly
2	29 November 1949	Stadiumi Kombëtar Qemal Stafa, Tirana, Albania	Albania	2–0	4–1	Friendly
3	14 May 1950	Stadion Olimpijski, Wrocław, Poland	Poland	2–2	3–3	Friendly
4	20 May 1951	Stadion Československé Armády, Prague, Czechoslovakia	Czechoslovakia	1–1	2–2	Friendly
5	20 May 1951	Stadion Československé Armády, Prague, Czechoslovakia	Czechoslovakia	2–2	2–2	Friendly
6	26 October 1952	Stadionul Republicii, Bucharest, Romania	East Germany	1–0	3–1	Friendly
7	26 October 1952	Stadionul Republicii, Bucharest, Romania	East Germany	2–1	3–1	Friendly
8	26 October 1952	Stadionul Republicii, Bucharest, Romania	East Germany	3–1	3–1	Friendly

== Honours ==
Kolozsvári AC

- Magyar Kupa runner-up: 1943–44

Progresul Oradea

- Divizia A: 1948–49
- Divizia B: 1955
- Cupa României: 1956, runner-up 1955

Flamura Roșie Arad

- Divizia A: 1954
- Cupa României: 1953

Individual

- Divizia A top-scorer: 1948–49, 1951
