= Iosif Stibinger =

Romanian association football player

Iosif Stibinger / János Barna
Personal information
- Full name: Iosif Ioan Stibinger
- Date of birth: 24 September 1923
- Place of birth: Reșița, Romania
- Date of death: 17 June 1949 (aged 25)
- Place of death: Arad, Romania
- Height: 1.75 m (5 ft 9 in)
- Position: Forward

Senior career*
Years	Team	Apps	(Gls)
1941–1942	Elektromos	12	(5)
1942–1944	Nagyváradi AC	47	(10)
1945–1946	Elektromos	19	(4)
1946–1949	ITA Arad	50	(19)
Total		127	(38)

International career^{‡}
1947–1948	Romania	2	(0)
- * Club domestic league appearances and goals as of 22 November 2017 ‡ National team caps and goals as of 22 November 2017

Iosif Ioan Stibinger (also known as János Stibinger or János Barna; 24 September 1923 – 17 June 1949) was a Romanian football player who played as a striker at international level for Romania.

== Club career ==
Stibinger was born on 24 September 1923 in Reșița, Romania. He began playing senior-level football at Hungarian team Elektromos at age 18, making his Nemzeti Bajnokság I debut on 21 September 1941 under coach Gusztáv Sebes in a 3–1 loss to Gamma. He scored his first goal in his next match, a 3–3 draw against Diósgyőr. After one year, Stibinger joined Nagyváradi AC in Crișana, then occupied by Hungary, winning the 1943–44 Nemzeti Bajnokság I under coach Ferenc Rónay, contributing with three goals scored in 20 matches. In 1945, he returned to play for one year at Elektromos. Subsequently, Stibinger joined ITA Arad where he made his Divizia A debut on 11 May 1947 in a 1–1 draw against CFR București. He scored four goals in six matches in his first season spent at ITA, as the club won the title. In the following season, he helped the club win The Double, scoring 12 goals in 26 league matches under coach Petre Steinbach. On 7 March 1948, in a 6–1 away victory against CSCA București, he and teammate Adalbert Kovács each scored three goals, marking the first time two players from the same team netted a hat-trick. He also played the entire match in the 3–2 victory in the 1948 Cupa României final against CFR Timișoara. Stibinger made his last Divizia A appearance in a 4–1 victory against CFR Cluj, totaling 50 games with 19 goals in the competition, all for ITA.

== International career ==
Stibinger played two games for Romania, making his debut under coach Colea Vâlcov in a 3–1 loss to Yugoslavia in the 1947 Balkan Cup, played at the Giulești Stadium in Bucharest. His second and last appearance also took place at the Giulești Stadium in a 1–0 loss to Albania in the 1948 Balkan Cup.

== Death ==
Stibinger died in the summer of 1949 in Arad at age 25, suffering from jaundice.

== Honours ==
Nagyváradi AC

- Nemzeti Bajnokság I: 1943–44

ITA Arad

- Divizia A: 1946–47, 1947–48
- Cupa României: 1947–48
