= Glanzmann =

Glanzmann is a surname. Notable people with the surname include:

- Andrei Glanzmann (1907–1988), Romanian footballer
- Chrigel Glanzmann (born 1975), Swiss musician
- Fredy Glanzmann (born 1963), Swiss Nordic combined skier
- Ida Glanzmann (born 1958), Swiss politician

== See also ==
- Sam Glanzman (1924–2017), American comics artist
