= Camil Schertz =

Romanian professional footballer

Personal information
- Date of birth: 6 February 1921
- Place of birth: Oradea, Romania
- Date of death: 1983 (aged 61)
- Place of death: Oradea, Romania
- Position: Forward

Youth career
- 1935–1938: CA Oradea

Senior career*
Years	Team	Apps	(Gls)
1938–1942	Nagyvárad AC	22	(4)
1942–1944	Csepel	45	(5)
1944–1945	MÁVAG	7	(0)
1945–1946	Maccabi București		
1946–1948	Hakoah-Sparta Arad		
1948–1949	ITA Arad	4	(0)
1949–1953	Metalul Oradea		
Total		78	(9)

Managerial career
- 1954–1955: Progresul Oradea (assistant)
- 1955–1957: Progresul Oradea
- 1958–1959: Voința Oradea
- 1959–1961: Stăruința Salonta
- 1964–1965: Steaua Roșie Salonta
- 1969–1972: Minerul Bihor
- 1972–1973: Olimpia Oradea (technical director)
- 1973–1975: Olimpia Oradea
- * Club domestic league appearances and goals as of 3 July 2020

Camil Schertz or Camil Scherz (also known as Kamill Fuszek; 6 February 1921 – 1983) was a Romanian professional footballer and manager. As a footballer, Schertz played for Club Atletic Oradea, Csepel and ITA Arad, among others, also winning the 1948 Romanian title with ITA Arad. After retirement, Schertz was the manager of Club Atletic Oradea (named at that time as Progresul Oradea), club with which won the 1956 Cupa României.

== Honours ==
=== Player ===
Nagyvárad AC

- Nemzeti Bajnokság II: 1940–41

ITA Arad

- Divizia A: 1947–48

=== Manager ===
Progresul Oradea

- Cupa României: 1956; runner-up 1955
