= Andor Tyirják =

Romanian professional footballer

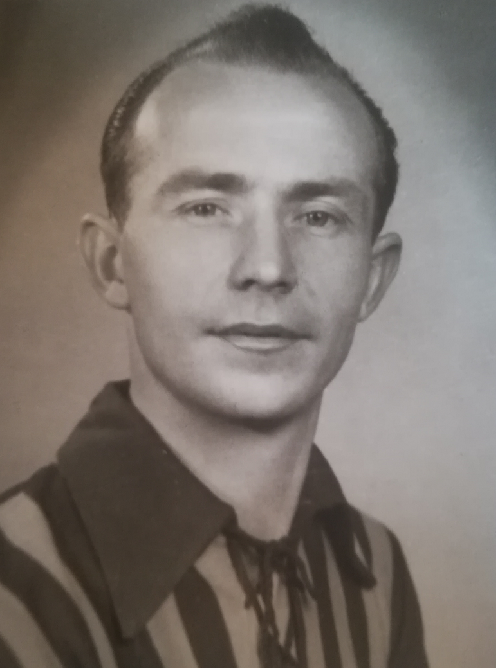
- Tyirják in 1960

Personal information
- Date of birth: 12 September 1926
- Place of birth: Oradea, Kingdom of Romania
- Date of death: 25 April 1997 (aged 70)
- Place of death: Oradea, Romania
- Height: 1.75 m (5 ft 9 in)
- Position: Defender

Youth career
- 1936–1939: Elektromos FC
- 1940–1945: Nagyváradi AC

Senior career*
Years	Team	Apps	(Gls)
1946–1948	Libertatea Oradea	21	(0)
1948–1949	RATA Târgu Mureș	14	(0)
1950	CFR Oradea		
1951	Locomotiva București	4	(0)
1953–1961	Flamura Roșie Oradea	0	(0)
1953–1961	CS Oradea	133	(7)
Total		172	(7)
- * Club domestic league appearances and goals as of 30 January 2021

Andor Tyirják (also known as Andrei Țiriac or Andrei Tiriák; born 12 September 1926 – 25 April 1997) was a Romanian professional footballer of Hungarian ethnicity. He grew up in Oradea at Elektromos FC and Nagyváradi AC, then after World War II was an important member of football teams based in Oradea, playing especially for Club Atletic Oradea, but also for teams such as CFR Oradea or Flamura Roșie Oradea. In 1951 he was transferred by Locomotiva București, playing in 4 league matches for "the white and burgundies".

Tyirják was a player of Club Atletic Oradea, captain of the team and winner of the Romanian Cup in 1956, also runner-up in 1955.

== Honours ==
Progresul Oradea

- Divizia B: 1955
- Cupa României: 1956
- Cupa României: Runner-up 1955
