= Stadionul Tineretului (Oradea) =

Sports venue in Oradea, Romania

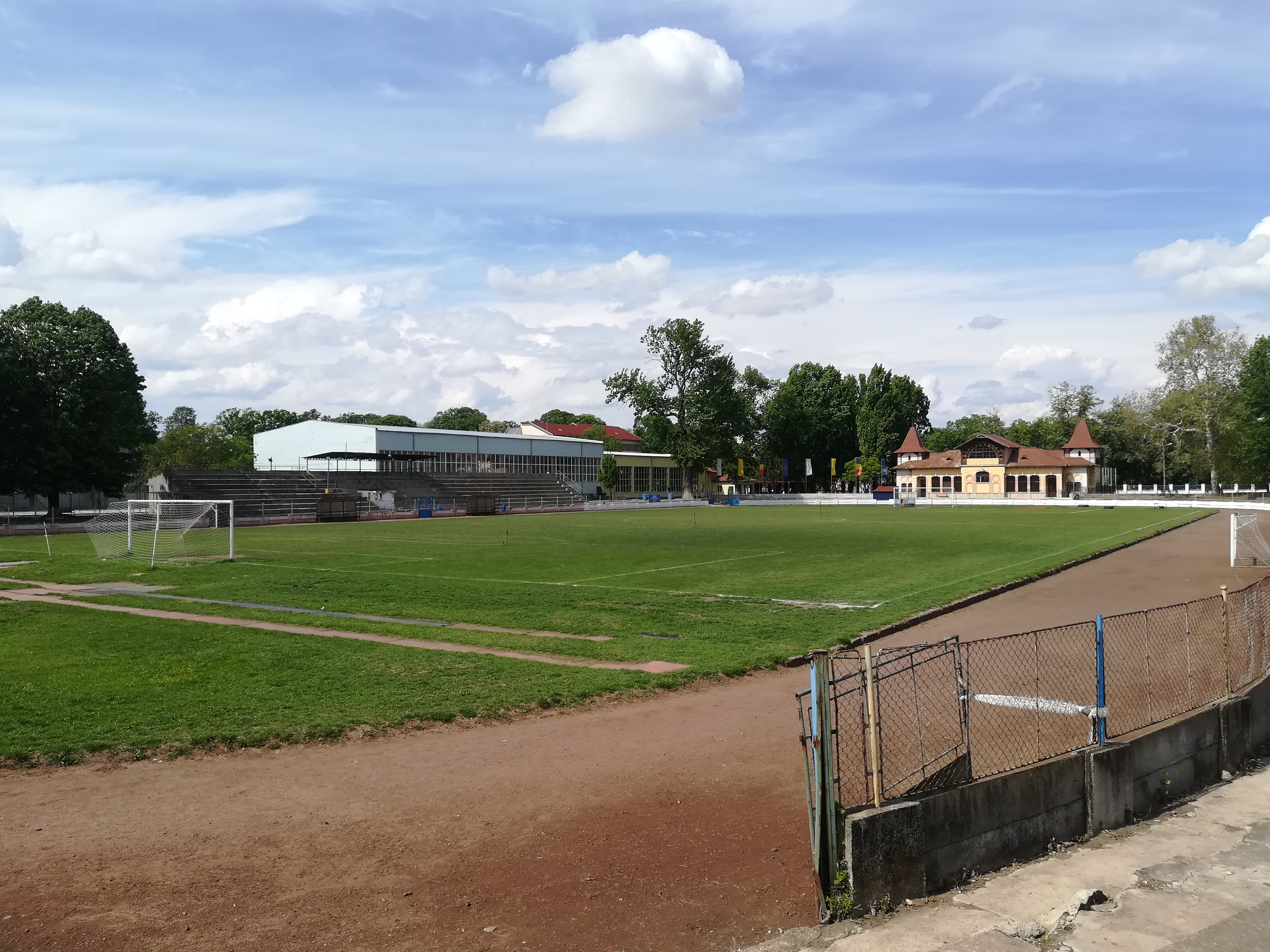
- Interactive map of Stadionul Tineretului
- Former names: Grădina Rhédey (Rhédey Garden); Voievodul Mihai (Prince Michael)
- Address: Calea Matei Basarab, nr. 4
- Location: Oradea, Romania
- Coordinates: 47°02′56″N 21°55′10.5″E
- Owner: Ministry of National Education
- Operator: LPS Bihorul Oradea; CA Oradea
- Capacity: 3,000 (100 seated)
- Surface: Grass

Construction
- Opened: 4 June 1895
- Renovated: 2005, 2009

Tenants
- CA Oradea (1910–1924, 2025–present); CS Bihorul (1920–1940); Olimpia Oradea (1950–1975); Dinamo MIU Oradea (1975–1976); Înfrățirea Oradea (1976–2000); LPS Bihorul Oradea (1977–present); Lotus Băile Felix (2006–2007)

Stadionul Tineretului is a multi-use stadium in Oradea, Romania. The stadium was opened on 4 June 1895 as part of the sports pavilion of the Rhédey Garden. Located in the southwestern part of the city between Nicolae Bălcescu Park and Oradea Zoological Garden, the stadium is considered to be the birthplace of many sports in the city located on the banks of the Crișul Repede river. Besides historical and sentimental value, the arena has also an architectural value, in the northern end of the stadium being a ground floor building and two small towers originally built to serve for dancing, a new restaurant and a buffet. The building is the work of famous architects Kálmán Rimanóczy Sr. and Kálmán Rimanóczy Jr.

On 14 May 1898 on Stadionul Tineretului was held the first cycling contest and on 1 June 1902, the first football match was played. The stadium was also the home ground of Club Atletic Oradea from its foundation until 1924, when Stadionul Iuliu Bodola was opened. In the 1930s the stadium was renamed as Stadionul Voievodul Mihai, in the honor of Prince Michael being the home of CS Bihorul and the home ground of many sports competitions.

After the establishment of the communism in Romania, the stadium was mainly the venue of the youth competitions and was renamed as Stadionul Tineretului (Youth Stadium). From 1977 the main operator of the stadium and sports pavilion is LPS Bihorul Oradea, the Sports High School from the city. The Arena underwent renovations in 2005 and 2009, and it would now need new ones.
