= Iuliu Darok =

Romanian footballer

Personal information
- Date of birth: 1924
- Position: Defender

Senior career*
Years	Team	Apps	(Gls)
1946–1948	Dermata Cluj	25	(0)
1948–1949	CFR București	20	(0)
1950–1952	Progresul Oradea	52	(0)
Total		97	(0)

International career
1947	Romania	2	(0)

Managerial career
- 1961–1964: Steaua Roșie Salonta
- 1965–1967: Steaua Roșie Salonta
- 1968–1969: Steaua Roșie Salonta
- 1969–1970: Metalul Salonta
- 1973–1974: Recolta Salonta
- * Club domestic league appearances and goals

Iuliu Darok (born 1924, date of death unknown) was a Romanian footballer who played as a defender.

== International career ==
Iuliu Darok played two matches for Romania, making his debut on 12 October 1947 under coach Ferenc Rónay in a 3–0 loss against Hungary. His second game was a friendly which ended 0–0 against Poland.

== Honours ==
Dermata Cluj

- Divizia B: 1946–47
