= Francisc Spielmann =

Hungarian-Romanian footballer

Francisc Spielmann Ferenc Sárvári
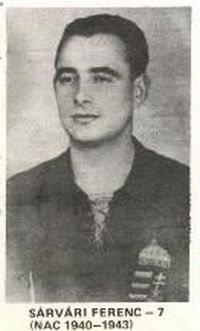

Personal information
- Date of birth: 10 July 1916
- Place of birth: Nagyvárad, Austria-Hungary
- Date of death: 21 November 1974 (aged 58)
- Place of death: Oradea, Romania
- Position: Forward

Youth career
- 1926–1934: Stăruința Oradea

Senior career*
Years	Team	Apps	(Gls)
1934–1940	CA Oradea	56	(11)
1940	UD Reșița	14	(5)
1940–1944	Nagyváradi AC	183	(100)
1945–1950	IC Oradea	11	(3)
1951–1953	Metalul Oradea	51	(23)
Total		315	(142)

International career^{‡}
1939–1949	Romania	11	(4)
1940–1943	Hungary	7	(3)

Managerial career
- 1954–1955: Metalul Oradea
- 1956: Flamura Roșie Oradea
- * Club domestic league appearances and goals as of 20 November 2017 ‡ National team caps and goals as of 20 November 2017

Francisc Spielmann (Hungarian: Sárvári Ferenc; 10 July 1916 – 21 November 1974) was a football player and coach of German ethnicity who played as a striker at international level for Romania and Hungary.

== Career ==
Spielmann begin his football career in 1926, at Stăruința Oradea. In 1934, he appeared in the colors of CA Oradea and immediately became a member of the silver medal team. In 1940 he made a short break to UD Reșița and then he returned to Oradea, which was already in the Hungarian Championship. He was a member of the 1943-44 Hungarian Champion and the 1948-49 Romanian Champion. He was top-scorer for NAC in their Hungarian title-winning season, with 23 goals; he was also the Hungarian player of the year. In 1950, he was put on a free agent list overnight. He returned to his first football club, Stăruința Oradea, which was named Metalul Oradea, in the county championship. He managed to move up two classes with the team and retired in 1953.

== International career ==
Between 1939 and 1949 he played 11 times for Romania and scored 4 goals. In the meantime, between 1940 and 1943 he was a member of the Hungary team. He went on track for seven times and scored 3 goals.

== Personal life ==
Spielmann was born in Oradea of Romanian German descent.

== Honours ==
=== Player ===
CA Oradea

- Nemzeti Bajnokság I (1): 1943–44
- Liga I (1): 1948–49
