= János Kovács (footballer, born 1919) =

Hungarian footballer (1919–1982)

Personal information
- Date of birth: 13 March 1919
- Place of birth: Timișoara, Kingdom of Romania
- Date of death: 1982 (aged 62–63)
- Place of death: Oradea, Romania
- Position: Forward

Youth career
- CAM Timișoara

Senior career*
Years	Team	Apps	(Gls)
- CAM Timișoara
- Craiova
- Prahova Ploiești
- Paris
1937–1938	Crișana Oradea		
1938–1940	Prahova Ploiești		
1941–1944	Nagyváradi AC	66	(47)
1945	Libertatea Oradea		
- Arad
1947	Stăruința Satu Mare		
1947–1948	Prahova Ploiești		
1948–1951	IC Oradea (Note: Only the statistics for the 1948–49 Divizia A season are available.)	62	(21)
Total		128	(68)

International career
1943	Hungary	1	(0)
- * Club domestic league appearances and goals

János Kovács (13 March 1919 – 1982) was a Hungarian footballer who played as a forward.

== Club career ==
Kovács played for several Hungarian clubs located in Romania, such as Nagyváradi AC, where he won the 1943–44 Nemzeti Bajnokság I and later with the same club but under a different name, IC Oradea, he won the 1948–49 Divizia A.

== International career ==
On 6 June 1943, János Kovács played his only match for Hungary, being used by coach Kálmán Vághy in a friendly which ended with a 4–2 victory against Bulgaria.

== Honours ==
Nagyváradi AC

- Nemzeti Bajnokság I: 1943–44

IC Oradea

- Divizia A: 1948–49
