= Dincă Schileru =

Romanian footballer

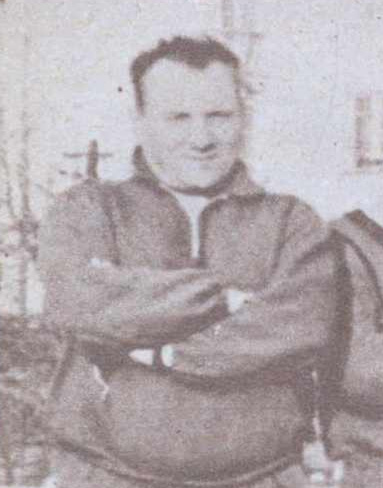
- Schileru in 1962

Personal information
- Date of birth: 1910
- Place of birth: Bucharest, Romania
- Date of death: 16 January 1992 (aged 81–82)
- Place of death: Saarbrücken, Germany
- Position: Forward

Youth career
- 1929: Generala București

Senior career*
Years	Team	Apps	(Gls)
1932–1934	Sportul Studențesc		
1934–1937	Unirea Tricolor București	55	(29)
1938	Valenciennes		
Total		55	(29)

International career
1935–1936	Romania	2	(1)

Managerial career
- 1952: Progresul Oradea
- 1954: Progresul Oradea
- 1956–1957: Progresul Oradea (assistant)
- 1957: Progresul Oradea
- 1958: Știința Timișoara
- 1961–1963: Siderurgistul Galați
- 1963–1964: Progresul București
- 1965–1970: Romania U23
- 1970–1971: Boluspor
- 1971–1972: Göztepe Izmir
- * Club domestic league appearances and goals

Dincă Schileru (1910 – 16 January 1992) was a Romanian footballer and manager. Schileru was the coach that won the 1957–58 Cupa României, which was the first trophy in Politehnica Timișoara's history. In 2008, he received post-mortem the Honorary Citizen of Timișoara title.

== International career ==
Dincă Schileru played two friendly games at international level for Romania, making his debut in a 4–1 victory against Poland in which he scored the opening goal in the first minute of the game.

== Honours ==
=== Player ===
Unirea Tricolor București

- Cupa României runner-up: 1935–36

=== Manager ===
Politehnica Timișoara

- Cupa României: 1957–58

Siderurgistul Galați

- Divizia B: 1962–63

Boluspor

- Prime Minister's Cup: 1970
