= Iosif Bartha =

Romanian footballer (1902–1957)

Personal information
- Date of birth: 18 July 1902
- Place of birth: Oradea, Austrian-Hungary
- Date of death: 26 October 1957 (aged 55)
- Place of death: Oradea, Romania
- Position: Defender

Senior career*
Years	Team	Apps	(Gls)
1921–1930	Stăruința Oradea		
1931–1932	Crișana Oradea		
1932–1933	Stăruința Oradea		
1933–1938	CA Oradea	74	(2)

International career
1922–1927	Romania	11	(0)
- * Club domestic league appearances and goals

Iosif Bartha (18 July 1902 – 26 October 1957) was a Romanian footballer. He competed in the men's tournament at the 1924 Summer Olympics.
