= Ștefan Czinczer =

Romanian footballer

Personal information
- Date of birth: 26 October 1905
- Place of birth: Arad, Austria-Hungary
- Date of death: 1 May 1990 (aged 84)
- Place of death: Arad, Romania
- Position: Goalkeeper

Youth career
- AMEF Arad

Senior career*
Years	Team	Apps	(Gls)
1925–1927	AMEF Arad		
1927–1929	UD Reșița		
1929–1939	CA Oradea	57	(0)
Total		38	(0)

International career^{‡}
1929–1932	Romania	6	(0)
- * Club domestic league appearances and goals as of 5 November 2019 ‡ National team caps and goals as of 5 November 2019

Ștefan Czinczer (26 October 1905 – 1 May 1990) was a Romanian footballer who played as a goalkeeper for teams such as AMEF Arad, UD Reșița or CA Oradea.

== International career ==
Czinczer played at international level in six matches for Romania.
