= Iuliu Kiss =

Romanian footballer

Personal information
- Date of birth: 1924
- Position: Midfielder

Senior career*
Years	Team	Apps	(Gls)
1950–1951	Armata Cluj		
1951–1956	Progresul Oradea (Note: The statistics for the 1955 Divizia B season are unavailable.)	99	(12)

International career
1953	Romania	1	(0)
- * Club domestic league appearances and goals

Iuliu Kiss (born 1924, date of death unknown) was a Romanian footballer who played as a midfielder over 100 matches for Progresul Oradea.

== International career ==
Iuliu Kiss played one match for Romania, on 28 June 1953 under coach Gheorghe Popescu I in a 3–1 victory against Bulgaria at the 1954 FIFA World Cup qualifiers.

== Honours ==
Progresul Oradea

- Divizia B: 1955
