= Andor Ónody =

Hungarian footballer

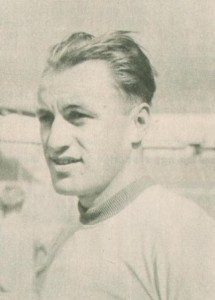

Personal information
- Date of birth: 3 August 1920
- Place of birth: Krasznokvajda, Hungary
- Date of death: 5 June 1986 (aged 65)
- Place of death: Budapest, Hungary
- Height: 1.75 m (5 ft 9 in)
- Position: Defender

Senior career*
Years	Team	Apps	(Gls)
1937–1940	Kispest	31	(0)
1940–1942	Elektromos	56	(0)
1942–1944	Nagyváradi AC	62	(0)
1945–1948	Ferencváros	94	(5)
1948–1950	Kinizsi Sörgyár		
1948–1950	Vasas Izzó		
Total		243	(5)

International career^{‡}
1946	Hungary	1	(0)

Managerial career
- Kinizsi Sörgyár (youth)
- Székesfehérvár
- Budakalász
- Lőrinci Fonó
- Vörös Meteor
- Láng Vasas
- Vasas Izzó
- Vasas Izzó (youth)
- * Club domestic league appearances and goals as of 22 November 2017 ‡ National team caps and goals as of 22 November 2017

Andor Ónody (3 August 1920 – 5 June 1986) was a Hungarian football player who played as a defender at internationally level for Hungary.

== Career ==
He started the football career at Kispest. In 1940 he was signed by Elektromos, where he played until 1942. His next club was the Nagyváradi AC, where he played for two seasons and after a silver medal, he became the champion of Hungary in 1944. Between 1945 and 1948 he was the player of Ferencváros. Here he earned a league silver medal and a bronze medal too. At Fradi, he played 118 games (93 league, 18 international, 7 domestic cups) and 3 goals (in 3 championships). He then played at the Kinizsi Sörgyár, then two years in the second class at Vasas Izzó.

== International career ==
In 1946 he played for Hungary national football team once.

== Manager career ==
Andor Ónody began his coach career at Kinizsi Sörgyár youth team. Later he worked in Székesfehérvár with a county team, then he worked for Lőrinc Fonó, Vörös Meteor, Láng Vasas and Vasas Izzó.
