= Baza Sportivă Paleu =

Multi-purpose stadium in Paleu, Bihor County, Romania

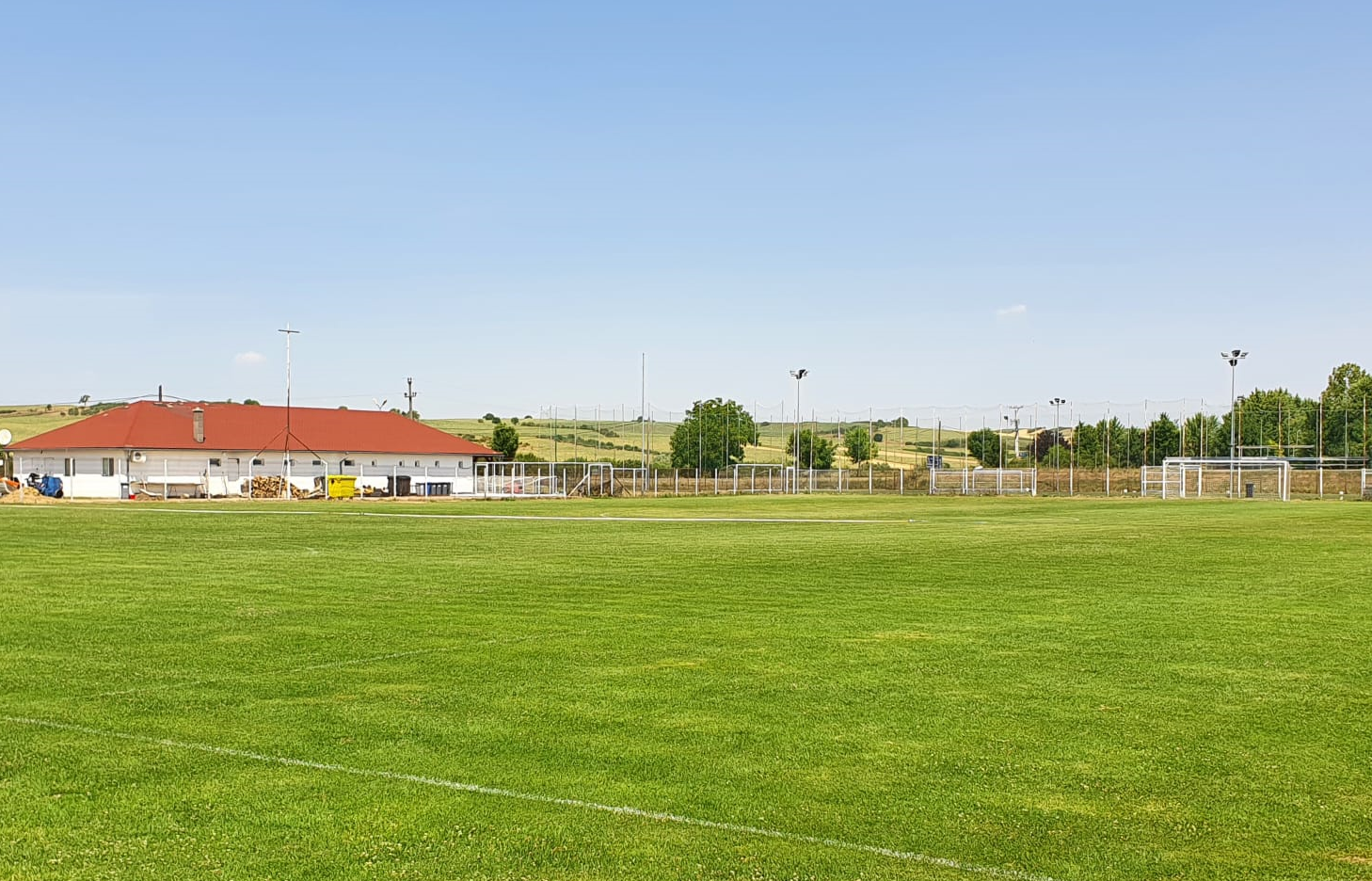
- Interactive map of Baza Sportivă Paleu
- Former names: Stadionul Comunal
- Address: DJ767F
- Location: Paleu, Romania
- Coordinates: 47°07′07.8″N 21°57′09.2″E
- Owner: Commune of Paleu
- Operator: CA Oradea
- Capacity: 1,500 (300 seated)
- Surface: Grass

Construction
- Opened: 2008

Tenants
- FC Paleu (2008–2017); Dinamo Oradea (2017–2018); CA Oradea (2022–present)

Baza Sportivă Paleu (Paleu Sports Base) is a multi-purpose stadium in Paleu, Bihor County, Romania. It is currently used mostly for football matches, is the home ground of CA Oradea and has a capacity of 1,500 people (300 on seats). In the past, the stadium was the home ground of FC Paleu and Dinamo Oradea.

Paleu Sports Base is composed of two grass football pitches, an artificial turf football pitch and one indoor arena.
