= 1948–49 Divizia A =

32nd season of top-tier football league in Romania

Divizia A
- Season: 1948–49
- Champions: IC Oradea
- Top goalscorer: Gheorghe Váczi (21)

The 1948–49 Divizia A was the thirty-second season of Divizia A, the top-level football league of Romania.

== Teams ==
Location of teams in 1948-49 Divizia A

== League table ==
Pos	Team	Pld	W	D	L	GF	GA	GD	Pts	Qualification or relegation
1	ICO Oradea (C)	26	16	5	5	60	36	+24	37	Champions of Romania
2	CFR București	26	14	4	8	61	33	+28	32	
3	Jiul Petroșani	26	11	8	7	44	40	+4	30	
4	RATA Târgu Mureș	26	13	4	9	51	37	+14	30	
5	CFR Timișoara	26	12	6	8	47	30	+17	30	
6	CSCA București	26	10	9	7	58	53	+5	29	
7	Petrolul București	26	11	7	8	47	37	+10	29	
8	Dinamo București	26	11	6	9	55	50	+5	28	
9	ITA Arad	26	9	9	8	45	34	+11	27	
10	CSU Timișoara	26	11	3	12	47	45	+2	25	
11	CFR Cluj (R)	26	9	5	12	39	67	−28	23	Relegation to Divizia B
12	CSU Cluj (R)	26	7	5	14	31	50	−19	19	Relegation to Divizia B
13	Metalochimic București (R)	26	5	4	17	50	80	−30	14	Relegation to Divizia B
14	Gaz Metan Mediaș (R)	26	3	5	18	27	70	−43	11	Relegation to Divizia B

Source: LT
Rules for classification: 1) points; 2) goal difference; 3) number of goals scored
(C) Champions; (R) Relegated

=== Results ===
Home \ Away	CFR	CLU	CFT	CSC	CSU	CST	DIN	GAZ	ORA	ITA	JIU	MET	PET	RAT
CFR București	—	12–2	0–1	5–2	1–2	2–0	5–2	2–0	2–1	3–1	5–2	4–0	1–1	0–1
CFR Cluj	2–1	—	1–3	1–1	1–0	1–2	2–5	2–2	1–2	1–0	2–2	2–1	0–2	0–0
CFR Timișoara	1–2	2–2	—	1–3	5–1	3–1	2–0	4–0	2–1	1–2	1–1	2–0	0–1	2–0
CSCA	1–1	1–4	3–1	—	3–2	5–4	0–1	3–0	3–3	4–3	3–1	2–2	0–0	0–1
CSU Cluj	0–1	0–1	0–2	0–0	—	0–2	1–1	4–2	2–3	2–1	1–1	2–1	0–0	4–1
CSU Timișoara	1–0	3–0	2–3	6–0	2–0	—	1–3	4–2	2–3	0–0	3–0	2–2	3–1	0–1
Dinamo	0–1	1–0	1–0	3–3	2–2	3–2	—	1–2	5–2	2–0	4–1	5–3	3–5	2–2
Gaz Metan	0–1	4–5	1–1	0–3	2–3	2–0	1–1	—	0–2	1–1	0–0	1–0	0–3	2–5
ICO Oradea	1–1	2–1	0–0	2–1	1–0	1–1	2–1	4–1	—	2–2	2–0	4–0	1–3	5–2
ITA Arad	3–2	4–1	1–1	3–3	4–1	2–0	4–0	3–0	1–2	—	0–1	1–1	2–2	2–0
Jiul Petroșani	1–1	4–1	3–2	2–2	3–0	4–0	3–2	3–1	1–0	0–0	—	3–2	1–0	2–1
Metalochimic	2–6	9–0	1–6	2–7	1–3	2–3	1–4	5–3	1–6	2–4	4–3	—	2–0	3–1
Petrolul București	4–1	3–4	1–1	2–3	3–1	1–2	3–1	2–0	3–5	1–1	1–0	3–3	—	1–0
RATA	2–1	1–2	2–0	3–2	6–0	4–1	2–2	8–0	0–3	1–0	2–2	3–0	2–1	—

Source: LT (in Romanian)
Legend: Blue = home team win; Yellow = draw; Red = away team win.

== Top goalscorers ==
Rank	Player	Club	Goals
1	Gheorghe Váczi	ICO Oradea	24
2	Constantin Titi Popescu	Petrolul București	18
3	Nicolae Drăgan	CSCA București / Metalochimic București	16
3	Ștefan Filotti	CFR București	16
3	János Kovács II	ICO Oradea	16

== Champion squad ==
ICO Oradea

Goalkeepers: Adolf Vécsey (Hungary) (24 / 0); Mircea David (5 / 0); Petru Fekete (1 / 0).
Defenders: Gheorghe Pop (4 / 0); Vasile Ion (23 / 0); Ștefan Boszacky (2 / 0); Gheorghe Melan (26 / 0).
Midfielders: Gheorghe Bodo (26 / 3); Ladislau Zilahi (26 / 1); Ștefan Cuc (6 / 0); Gavril Serfözö (12 / 0).
Forwards: János Kovács II (Hungary) (26 / 16); Francisc Spielmann (26 / 9); Gheorghe Váczi (26 / 24); Mircea Tudose (23 / 3); Iosif Turcuș (26 / 3); Alexandru Pop (8 / 1); Ioan Lucaci (1 / 0); Carol Pop (3 / 0).
(league appearances and goals listed in brackets)

Manager: Nicolae Kovács.

== See also ==
- 1948–49 Divizia B
