= Mircea David =

Romanian footballer

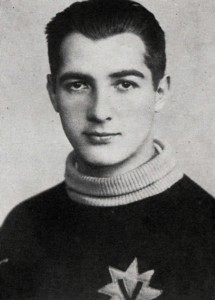

Personal information
- Date of birth: 16 October 1914
- Place of birth: Sinaia, Prahova County, Romania
- Date of death: 12 October 1993 (aged 78)
- Place of death: Iaşi, Romania
- Height: 1.75 m (5 ft 9 in)
- Position: Goalkeeper

Youth career
- 1929–1933: CA Oradea

Senior career*
| Years | Team | Apps | (Gls) |
| 1933–1938 | CA Oradea | 68 | (0) |
| 1938–1947 | Venus București | 58 | (0) |
| 1947–1948 | 23 August Lugoj | | |
| 1948–1951 | ICO Oradea | 32 | (0) |
| Total | | 158 | (0) |

International career
| 1936–1943 | Romania | 12 | (0) |

Managerial career
- 1952–1960: Politehnica Iași
- * Club domestic league appearances and goals

Mircea David (16 October 1914 – 12 October 1993) was a Romanian football player, who played as a goalkeeper. After a match between Romania and Italy, played in Rome, he was nicknamed by the Italian football fans Il Dio, because of his incredible saves. He was a member of the Romania national football team which competed at the 1938 FIFA World Cup, but did not play any match.

== Early life ==
Mircea David was born in Sinaia, in October 1914. After a short period of time, Mircea moved, with his family, to Oradea. In the high school, David began to play oina, a Romanian traditional sport, similar to baseball.

After a time, he started to play football with his older friends. But after a while, bored because he was often selected as a goalkeeper, he refused to play football and he went to gymnastics.

In the summer holiday, his father bought him a football. Because of that, he started to play football again. Moreover, he attended the match between the local team CA Oradea and Wacker Wien, and he admired the Austrian goalkeeper, Rudy Hiden. This was the reason because he chose to be a goalkeeper.

== Career ==
=== Club career ===
In 1933, he started his senior career at Clubul Atletic Oradea. In one of his first matches for CAO, he saved seven penalty kicks in a friendly match against Minerul Lupeni. He continued to play well at his club, where he stayed until 1938, when he was sold to Venus București together with his teammate Gusztáv Juhász because the club was in a financial crisis.

In his first season at Venus București, he won the Romanian championship with his team. In the next season, he repeated the performance. He remained at Venus until 1947, when he left the Bucharest-based team for 23 August a team from Lugoj.

In 1948, he returned to his first club, renamed IC Oradea, to win for the third time Divizia A. In 1952, he retired from playing.

=== Manager career ===
After his retirement as a player, Mircea David began his managerial career at FC Politehnica Iași. After winning the promotion to Divizia A in 1960, he renounced to be a manager and was appointed as a member in the structure of Romanian Football Federation.

=== International career ===
David made his debut for the Romania national football team in October 1936, in a match lost against Hungary. In 1938, he was selected in the Romanian squad for the FIFA World Cup, but did not play in the two matches between Romania and Cuba.

On 14 April 1940, Mircea David was selected in the starting lineup for the match between Romania and Italy, the World Champions. The match, which took place at Stadio Nazionale PNF, was the game when David became a legend.

After a first half dominated by the Italians, David was already a hero for Romania, because of a couple of marvellous saves in front of Silvio Piola and Sergio Bertoni. Romania took the lead shortly after the break, when Iuliu Baratky scored the first goal of the match.

Despite receiving two goals from Amedeo Biavati and Silvio Piola and being seriously injured after a collision with Sergio Bertoni, David was determined not to give up. He continued to rescue his team by plunging in the feet of the Italian strikers. Until the end of the game, he jumped in air to catch a ball and, after a wonderful save, he felt on the ground and fainted.

He continued to play after awaking and ended the match in the ground. He received praises from Vitorio Pozzo, the only manager who won twice the FIFA World Cup. Pozzo said : "With Piola as a striker and David in the goal, a manager doesn't have any problem to win a game". He was also praised by Silvio Piola and the Italian fans, who nicknamed him "Il Dio".

== Honours ==
=== Player ===
Venus București

- Divizia A (2): 1938–39, 1939–40

IC Oradea

- Divizia A (1): 1948–49

=== Coach ===
Politehnica Iași

- Divizia B (1): 1959–60
