= 1955 Cupa României final =

- Event: 1955 Cupa României
CCA București	Progresul Oradea
6	3
- Date: 18 December 1955
- Venue: Republicii, Bucharest
- Referee: Dumitru Schulder (Bucharest)
- Attendance: 30,000

The 1955 Cupa României final was the 18th final of Romania's most prestigious football cup competition. It was disputed between CCA București and Progresul Oradea, and was won by CCA București after a game with nine goals, in extra time. It was the fifth cup for CCA București.

Progresul Oradea was the forth club representing Divizia B which reached the Romanian Cup final, after CAM Timișoara in 1938, Flacăra Mediaș in 1951 and Metalul Reșița in 1954.

== Match details ==
18 December 1955
14:00 EET

CCA București	6–3 (a.e.t.)	Progresul Oradea
Zavoda 57'; Alecsandrescu 65', 108'; Moldovan 68'; Constantin 95'; Onisie 101'	Report	Tóth 45'; Florea 58'; Vlad 77'

Republicii, Bucharest
Attendance: 30,000
Referee: Dumitru Schulder (Bucharest)

GK	1	(Romania) Costică Toma
DF	2	(Romania) Vasile Zavoda
DF	3	(Romania) Alexandru Karikaș
DF	4	(Romania) Victor Dumitrescu
MF	5	(Romania) Ștefan Onisie
MF	6	(Romania) Tiberiu Bone
FW	7	(Romania) Victor Moldovan
FW	8	(Romania) Gheorghe Constantin
FW	9	(Romania) Ion Alecsandrescu
FW	10	(Romania) Francisc Zavoda
FW	11	(Romania) Nicolae Tătaru
Manager:
(Romania) Ștefan Dobay & Ilie Savu

GK	1	(Romania) Adalbert Gébner
DF	2	(Romania) Iancu Vărzan
DF	3	(Romania) Alexandru Coman
DF	4	(Romania) Gheorghe Barcu
MF	5	(Romania) Iosif Bartha
MF	6	(Romania) Ladislau Krempánszky
FW	7	(Romania) Ludovic Tóth
FW	8	(Romania) Ladislau Köszegy
FW	9	(Romania) Alexandru Florea
FW	10	(Romania) Ladislau Vlad
FW	11	(Romania) Iuliu Kiss
Manager:
(Romania) Ladislau Zilahi

== See also ==
- List of Cupa României finals
