= Gheorghe Bodo =

Romanian footballer (1923–2004)

Personal information
- Date of birth: 1923
- Place of birth: Vișeu de Jos, Romania
- Date of death: 2004 (aged 81)
- Place of death: Oradea, Romania
- Position: Midfielder

Senior career*
Years	Team	Apps	(Gls)
1946–1959	CA Oradea	204	(35)
Total		204	(35)

International career^{‡}
1948–1952	Romania	8	(2)
- * Club domestic league appearances and goals as of 10 November 2018 ‡ National team caps and goals as of 10 November 2018

Gheorghe Bodo (also known as Bodó György; 1923 – 2004) was a Romanian professional footballer who played his entire career for CA Oradea (in over 200 league matches) as a midfielder. He played at international level in 8 matches for Romania and scored 2 goals, also being a member of the team that competed in the men's tournament of the 1952 Summer Olympics.

== Honours ==
CA Oradea

- Liga I: 1948–49
