= Adolf Vécsey =

Hungarian footballer

Adolf Vécsey / Adolf Weber
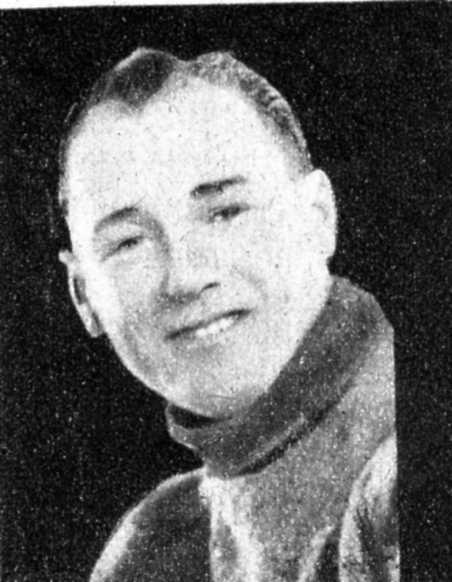

Personal information
- Date of birth: 13 June 1915
- Place of birth: Kispest, Austria-Hungary
- Date of death: 1979 (aged 64)
- Place of death: Frankfurt, West Germany
- Position: Goalkeeper

Senior career*
Years	Team	Apps	(Gls)
1935–1940	Salgótarján	19	(0)
1940–1942	Kispest	46	(0)
1942–1945	Nagyváradi AC	57	(0)
1945–1946	Pécsi VSK	25	(0)
1946–1947	Libertatea Oradea	42	(0)
1947	Cremo		
1948–1952	Progresul Oradea	32	(0)
Total		221	(0)
- * Club domestic league appearances and goals as of 30 April 2020

Adolf Vécsey (also known as Adolf Weber; 13 June 1916 – 1979) was a Hungarian football player who played as a goalkeeper. He played mostly for Club Atletic Oradea, in over 130 matches and won two league titles.

== Career ==
Adolf Vécsey contracted to Nagyváradi AC at the beginning of the 1940s after a career started at Salgótarján and continued at Kispest. At NAC he was the number one goalkeeper of the 1943–44 season, when the green and whites won the Hungarian Championship. After World War II, he returned to Oradea. At the end of the 1948–49 season he won again the championship, now in Romania.

In 1952, in Bucharest, they played a championship match against Dinamo București. The opponent's coach, Iuliu Baratky, former football player born in Oradea and also NAC former player, sent the midfielders on the pitch with the tactical advice to annoy Vécsey until he was defeated. The goalkeeper tolerated for a while, the five insults, but at one point he succumbed, the striker immediately dashed out and Vécsey was eliminated by the referee. The 1-1 match was lost 3-1 because of the big free spaces appeared by the goalkeeper's absence. Vécsey was forbidden by the football association forever and his active career ended at the age of 37.

After returning to Hungary he wanted to start his career as a coach, but he quickly realized that this would not work for him. After that, for years he lived in Budapest, than he moved in the West Germany and lived in Frankfurt until the age of 64 when he died of gastric cancer.

== Honours ==
Club Atletic Oradea

- NB I: 1943–44
- Divizia A: 1948–49
