= Gavril Serfőző =

Romanian footballer

Personal information
- Full name: Gábor Serfőző
- Date of birth: 25 September 1926
- Place of birth: Oradea, Romania
- Date of death: 16 May 2002 (aged 75)
- Place of death: Oradea, Romania
- Position: Midfielder

Youth career
- 1942–1945: Nagyváradi AC

Senior career*
Years	Team	Apps	(Gls)
1946–1949	ICO Oradea	62	(0)
1949–1950	CCA București	31	(9)
1951–1952	Progresul Oradea	40	(12)
1953–1958	UTA Arad	95	(7)
1959–1960	CSM Reșița		
1960–1962	CFR Timișoara		
Total		228	(28)

International career
1950–1954	Romania	13	(2)
- * Club domestic league appearances and goals

Gavril Serfőző (25 September 1926 – 16 May 2002) was a Romanian footballer. He competed in the men's tournament at the 1952 Summer Olympics.

== Honours ==
CA Oradea

- Liga I: 1948–49

CCA București

- Cupa României: 1948–49, 1950

UTA Arad

- Liga I: 1954
- Cupa României: 1953
