= Andrei Glanzmann =

Romanian footballer and coach

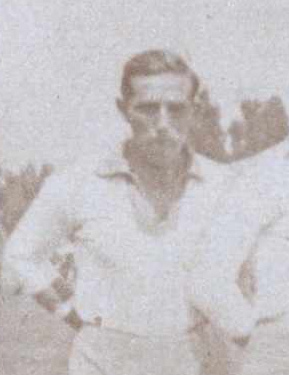
- Glanzmann in 1932

Personal information
- Date of birth: 27 March 1907
- Place of birth: Eperjes, Austria-Hungary
- Date of death: 23 June 1988 (aged 81)
- Position: Forward

Senior career*
Years	Team	Apps	(Gls)
1929–1930	CA Oradea	4	(0)
1930	Ripensia Timişoara		
1930–1935	CA Oradea	46	(12)

International career
1931–1932	Romania	13	(2)

Managerial career
- 1946–1947: CS Târgu Mureş
- * Club domestic league appearances and goals

Andrei Glanzmann (27 March 1907 – 23 June 1988) was a Romanian international football forward and coach.

== Career ==
His club football career began at CA Oradea with a first spell between 1929 and 1930, before a brief stint at Ripensia Timișoara in 1930. He then returned to CA Oradea, where he played until 1935.

Glanzmann made thirteen appearances and scored two goals for the Romania national football team. He was selected in the squad for the 1930 FIFA World Cup finals, but did not play.
