= Iuliu Bodola Stadium =

Stadium in Romania

- Stadionul FC Bihor
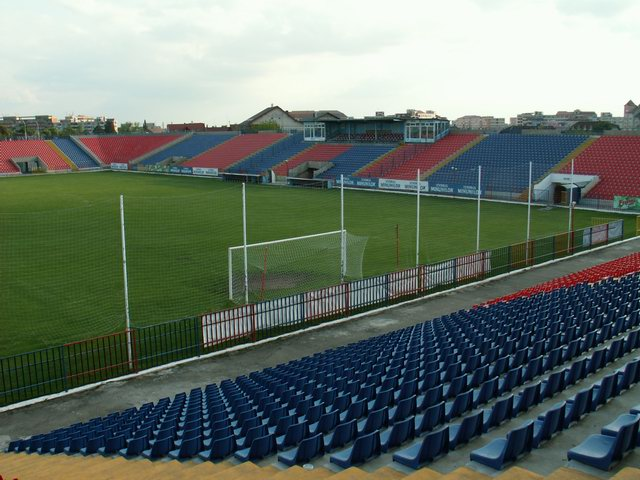
- The stadium in 2008
- Interactive map of Iuliu Bodola Stadium
- Former names: Municipal Stadium (1924–2008)
- Address: Str. Dr. Ioan Cantacuzino, nr. 1
- Location: Oradea, Romania
- Coordinates: 47°4′19″N 21°55′48″E
- Owner: Municipality of Oradea
- Operator: FC Bihor
- Capacity: 12,376 seated (restricted, East Stand closed)
- Surface: Grass
- Field size: 105 x 68m

Construction
- Opened: 1924
- Renovated: 2004, 2007, 2015

Tenants
- CA Oradea (1924–1963), (2017–2022); FC Bihor (1958) (1958–2016); FC Bihor (2022) (2022–present)

The Iuliu Bodola Stadium is a multi-purpose stadium in Oradea, Romania. The stadium is the home ground of FC Bihor Oradea. Between 1924 and 1963, then between 2017 and 2022 it was the home ground of CA Oradea and between 1958 and 2016 it was the home ground of FC Bihor Oradea (1958). The stadium holds 12,376 people, seated, restricted from 18,000, as the east stand is closed. It used to be called Municipal, and in November 2008 the name was changed to Iuliu Bodola, after the international footballer.

- It was opened in 1924.
- On this stadium plays FC Bihor.
- 31st stadium in the country by capacity.

== Events ==
=== Association football ===
International football matches
| Date | Competition | Home | Away | Score | Attendance |
|---|---|---|---|---|---|
| 11 April 1984 | Friendly | Romania | Israel | 0 - 0 | ~30,000 |
| 28 May 2008 | UEFA Women's Euro 2009 qualifying | Romania | Hungary | 3 - 1 | |
| 12 November 2015 | 2016 UEFA Euro U-19 qualification | Switzerland | Andorra | 1 - 0 | 203 |
| 12 November 2015 | 2016 UEFA Euro U-19 qualification | Romania | Faroe Islands | 2 - 0 | 1,217 |
| 14 November 2015 | 2016 UEFA Euro U-19 qualification | Faroe Islands | Switzerland | 0 - 4 | 41 |
| 14 November 2015 | 2016 UEFA Euro U-19 qualification | Romania | Andorra | 2 - 0 | 1,256 |
| 17 November 2015 | 2016 UEFA Euro U-19 qualification | Switzerland | Romania | 3 - 1 | 860 |

=== Association football ===
International football clubs matches
| Date | Competition | Home | Away | Score | Attendance |
|---|---|---|---|---|---|
| 15 July 1926 | Friendly | (Romania) CAO + Stăruința | (Austria) Wr. Amateur SV | 1 - 0 | ~2,800 |
| 1 August 1926 | Friendly | (Romania) CAO + Stăruința | (Austria) Wiener AC | 1 - 0 | |
| 15 August 1929 | Friendly | (Romania) CAO + Stăruința | (Austria) Wacker Wien | 1 - 2 | |
| 11 July 1932 | Friendly | (Romania) CA Oradea | (Austria) Rapid Wien | 3 - 3 | ~3,000 |
| 4 June 1933 | Friendly | (Romania) Crișana Oradea | (Austria) FC Wien | 2 - 4 | ~2,500 |
| 5 June 1933 | Friendly | (Romania) Stăruința Oradea | (Austria) FC Wien | 0 - 3 | |
| 7 June 1933 | Friendly | (Romania) CAO + Stăruința | (Austria) FC Wien | 0 - 5 | ~3,000 |
| 8 June 1933 | Friendly | (Romania) CAO + Ripensia | (Austria) Floridsdorfer AC | 0 - 1 | ~3,000 |
| 27 May 1934 | Friendly | (Romania) CA Oradea | (Austria) FC Wien | 3 - 2 | ~4,000 |
| 19 June 1935 | Friendly | (Romania) Crișana Oradea | (Austria) Sturm Graz | 5 - 2 | |
| 9 July 1935 | Friendly | (Romania) CA Oradea | (Austria) Hakoah Vienna | 1 - 0 | ~3,000 |
| 16 July 1935 | Friendly | (Romania) CAO + Stăruința | (Austria) Hakoah Vienna | 3 - 4 | ~3,000 |
| 17 August 1978 | Friendly | (Romania) Bihor Oradea | (Brazil) Ponte Preta | 3 - 4 | |
| 25 February 1979 | Friendly | (Romania) Bihor Oradea | (Germany) Eintracht Frankfurt | 0 - 0 | ~15,000 |
| 19 July 2003 | Friendly | (Romania) Bihor Oradea | (Hungary) Debrecen | 1 - 1 | ~4,000 |
| 28 July 2003 | Friendly | (Romania) Bihor Oradea | (Egypt) Haras El Hodoud | 3 - 2 | |
| 22 September 2010 | Friendly | (Romania) Bihor Oradea | (Hungary) Debrecen II | 0 - 0 | |
| 9 October 2010 | Friendly | (Romania) Bihor Oradea | (Hungary) Debrecen | 0 - 0 | |
| 5 February 2011 | Friendly | (Romania) Bihor Oradea | (Hungary) Ferencváros | 1 - 3 | |

== See also ==
- City of Oradea Stadium
