= Ladislau Zilahi =

Romanian footballer and manager (1922–1996)

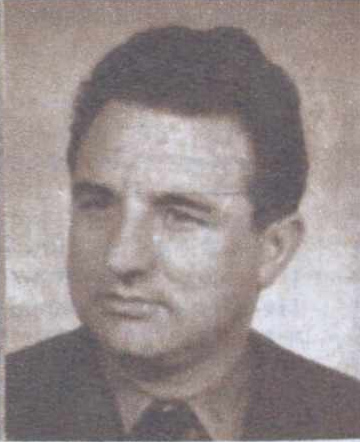

Personal information
- Date of birth: 24 February 1922
- Place of birth: Oradea, Romania
- Date of death: 22 April 1996 (aged 74)
- Place of death: Oradea, Romania
- Position: Midfielder

Youth career
- 1935–1940: CA Oradea

Senior career*
| Years | Team | Apps | (Gls) |
| 1940–1942 | Nagyváradi AC | 1 | (0) |
| 1942–1946 | Debrecen | 47 | (6) |
| 1946–1954 | Progresul Oradea | 142 | (8) |
| Total | | 190 | (14) |

International career
| | Romania B | 2 | (0) |
| 1949–1950 | Romania | 3 | (0) |

Managerial career
- 1955–1957: Progresul Oradea
- 1959–1961: CS Oradea
- 1961–1962: CSM Reșița
- 1962–1963: Crișul Oradea
- 1963–1964: Crișul Oradea (assistant)
- 1964–1966: Crișul Oradea
- 1966–1967: Steaua Roșie Salonta
- 1968–1972: Olimpia Oradea
- 1972–1980: Bihor Oradea (youth center)
Medal record
CA Oradea
| Winner | Divizia A | 1948–49 |
| Runner-up | Romanian Cup | 1955 |
- * Club domestic league appearances and goals

Ladislau "László" Zilahi (born 24 February 1922 – 22 April 1996) was a Romanian professional football player and manager of Hungarian ethnicity. Born in Oradea, Zilahi played in his career for CA Oradea (also known throughout its history as Libertatea, ICO or Progresul), which he won the Romanian national title in 1949, and for Debrecen. After retirement Zilahi coached for CA Oradea and FC Bihor Oradea, then known as Crișul Oradea. As a manager he reached the Romanian Cup final in 1955 with CA Oradea, by that time known as Progresul.

== International career ==
Zilahi played for Romania in three matches and for Romania B in other two matches.

== Honours ==
=== Player ===
CA Oradea

- Liga I: 1948–49

=== Manager ===
CA Oradea

- Romanian Cup runner-up: 1955
