= 1953 Cupa României =

Tournament details
- Country: Romania

Final positions
- Champions: Flamura Roşie Arad
- Runners-up: CCA București

The 1953 Cupa României was the 16th edition of Romania's most prestigious football cup competition.

The title was won by Flamura Roşie Arad against CCA București.

== Format ==
The competition is an annual knockout tournament.

In the first round proper, two pots were made, first pot with Divizia A teams and other teams till 16 and the second pot with the rest of teams qualified in this phase. First pot teams will play away. Each tie is played as a single leg.

If a match is drawn after 90 minutes, the game goes in extra time, and if the scored is still tight after 120 minutes, the team who plays away will qualify.

In case the teams are from same city, there a replay will be played.

In case the teams play in the final, there a replay will be played.

From the first edition, the teams from Divizia A entered in competition in sixteen finals, rule which remained till today.

== First round proper ==
Team 1	Score	Team 2
9 September 1953
Flamura Roşie Buhuşi (Div. C)	2–4	(Div. B) Dinamo Bacău
Locomotiva Cluj (Div. B)	0–1	(Div. A) Dinamo Oraşul Stalin
Şantierul Constanţa (Div. B)	1–2	(Div. A) Dinamo București
Ştiinţa Craiova (Div. C)	2–2 (a.e.t.)	(Div. B) Spartac București
Locomotiva Oradea (Div. B)	6–4 (a.e.t.)	(Div. A) Progresul Oradea
Flamura Roşie Piteşti (Div. B)	2–1	(Div. B) Metalul București
Flamura Roşie Sf. Gheorghe (Div. B)	0–5	(Div. A) Locomotiva București
Libertatea Sibiu (Div. B)	1–0	(Div. A) Minerul Petroşani
Locomotiva Turnu Severin (Div. B)	0–1	(Div. A) Ştiinţa Timişoara
10 September 1953
Spartac Arad (Div. C)	0–3	(Div. A) Flamura Roşie Arad
Metalul Baia Mare (Div. B)	1–2 (a.e.t.)	(Div. A) Ştiinţa Cluj
Şantierul Lugoj (Div. C)	0–2	(Div. A) Locomotiva Timişoara
Metalul Plopeni (Div. C)	2–5	(Div. B) Flacăra Ploieşti
16 September 1953
Locomotiva Iaşi (Div. B)	0–2	(Div. A) CCA București
CA Cluj (Div. B)	0–3 (forfeit)	(Div. A) Locomotiva Târgu Mureş
Ştiinţa Iaşi (Div. B)	3–0 (forfeit)	(Div. A) CA Câmpulung Moldovenesc

== Second round proper ==
Team 1	Score	Team 2
30 September 1953
Dinamo Bacău	1–1 (a.e.t.)	Locomotiva București
CCA București	4–1	Spartac București
Ştiinţa Iaşi	2–3	Dinamo București
Locomotiva Oradea	0–1	Ştiinţa Cluj
Flamura Roşie Piteşti	0–1	Ştiinţa Timişoara
Flacăra Ploieşti	3–0	Dinamo Oraşul Stalin
Locomotiva Timişoara	1–3	Flamura Roşie Arad
7 October 1953
Libertatea Sibiu	0–1	Locomotiva Târgu Mureş

== Quarter-finals ==
Team 1	Score	Team 2
21 October 1953
Dinamo București	0–2	Ştiinţa Cluj
Flacăra Ploieşti	1–2	CCA București
Ştiinţa Timişoara	1–4	Flamura Roşie Arad
Locomotiva Târgu Mureş	2–2 (a.e.t.)	Locomotiva București

== Semi-finals ==
Team 1	Score	Team 2
15 November 1953
CCA București	1–0	Locomotiva București
22 November 1953
Ştiinţa Cluj	2–2 (a.e.t.)	Flamura Roşie Arad

== Final ==
29 November 1953
12:00 EET

Flamura Roşie Arad	1–0 (a.e.t.)	CCA București
Váczi 110'	Report

23 August, Bucharest
Attendance: 50,000
Referee: Mihai Popa (Bucharest)

Cupa României 1953 winners

2nd title
