= Club Atletic Oradea =

Association football club in Oradea

- Full name: Club Atletic Oradea
- Nicknames: Alb-verzii (The White and Greens); Orădenii (The People from Oradea); Atleticii (The Athletics); Vulturii verzi (The Green Eagles)
- Short name: CA Oradea, CAO, NAC
- Founded: 25 May 1910; 116 years ago as Nagyváradi Atlétikai Club; 17 March 2017; 9 years ago (refounded)
- Ground: Tineretului
- Capacity: 3,000 (100 seated)
- Chairman: Florin Mal
- Manager: Lucian Stance
- League: Liga IV
- 2025–26: Liga IV, Bihor County, 2nd of 14
- Website: https://caoradea.ro/
Home colours	Away colours	Third colours

Club Atletic Oradea (Nagyváradi Atlétikai Club) (Romanian pronunciation: [ˌklub aˈtletik oˈrade̯a]), commonly known as CA Oradea (Nagyváradi AC), or simply as CAO (NAC), is a Romanian football club based in Oradea, Bihor County, which competes in the Liga IV.

The team was founded as Nagyváradi Atlétikai Club in 1910, when the city was part of Austria-Hungary. Over its history, CA Oradea won the Hungarian national title, the Romanian national title, and the Romania national cup on one occasion each. The Romanian title won during the 1948–49 season, under the name of ICO Oradea, meant that the team became part of a select group of entities that won the national title in different countries.

After World War II, the communist regime in Romania had a negative impact on the club's identity, forcing it to change its name and colours several times. In 1945 it was renamed Libertatea Oradea, in 1948 Întreprinderea Comunală Oradea (ICO), in 1951 Progresul Oradea, in 1958 CS Oradea, and in 1961 CSM Crișana Oradea (not to be confused with Crișana Oradea).

Dissolved in 1963 by the same communist regime, CA Oradea was re-established in the summer of 2017 as a private entity. In the same year, CA Oradea was enrolled in the fifth tier (Liga V), and three years returned to the national divisions (Liga III) after 58 years of absence.

== History ==
=== Early years, on the road (1910–1940) ===
The game of football had arrived to Nagyvárad (Oradea) in 1902 together with inhabitants that returned from study or work, from abroad or from Budapest. The first football match that was ever played on the banks of Crișul Repede river was a friendly one and was held in the Rhédey Garden. The game was gaining in popularity fast, but there was not yet an organized club to represent the town in matches against other towns. This organizational problem led to the establishment of Nagyváradi Sport Egyesület (NSE), then appeared Nagyváradi Torna Club (NTK), both multi-sport clubs, but none focused mainly on football. Then, eight years after that first football match played in Oradea's history, Nagyváradi Atlétikai Club (NAC) – in Romanian: Club Atletic Oradea (CAO) was established, also a multi-sport club, but with the football section as the "pearl of the crown".

Chart of yearly table positions of CA Oradea in the national leagues since 1932 and until their 1963 dissolution. Between 1940 and 1945 they activated in the Hungarian league system. In 2017 the team was revived in the fifth league.

The constituent assembly was held on 25 May 1910, in the EMKE Café (today Astoria Hotel), a place that also had an important contribution in the identity, bohemianism and cosmopolitanism of the football club. EMKE (Erdélyi Magyar Közművelődési Egyesület) Café, translated as the Coffee Shop of the Hungarian Cultural Association of Transylvania Coffee Shop, was the place where the Oradea's cultural elite spent much of its time, one of the main clients being the well-known poet Endre Ady. Back to the football club, the first board of directors was formed of: Dr. Emil Jonas (chairman), Béla Mikló (executive president), Andor Szabo (secretary) and Dr. Kálmán Kovács (cashier), one of the decision took also in that first day was to submit the documents for registration at the Hungarian Football Federation.

On 31 July 1910, NAC played its first game, against KVSC, and in January 1912 a home ground was secured, in the Rhédey Garden. The next month, a touring team from England came to town: Bishop Auckland, the Northern League champions that season, NAC won with an incredible 8–0. Before World War I, the club activated only on local and a regional level, they joined the eastern division of the Southern Hungarian League and in 1913 NAC won 25 out of 31 matches. One of the most important games for the local community, in this period, was the match against Hungarian giant, Ferencváros, played in Nagyvárad, on 6 July 1913 and lost honorable by NAC, with the score of 2–4.

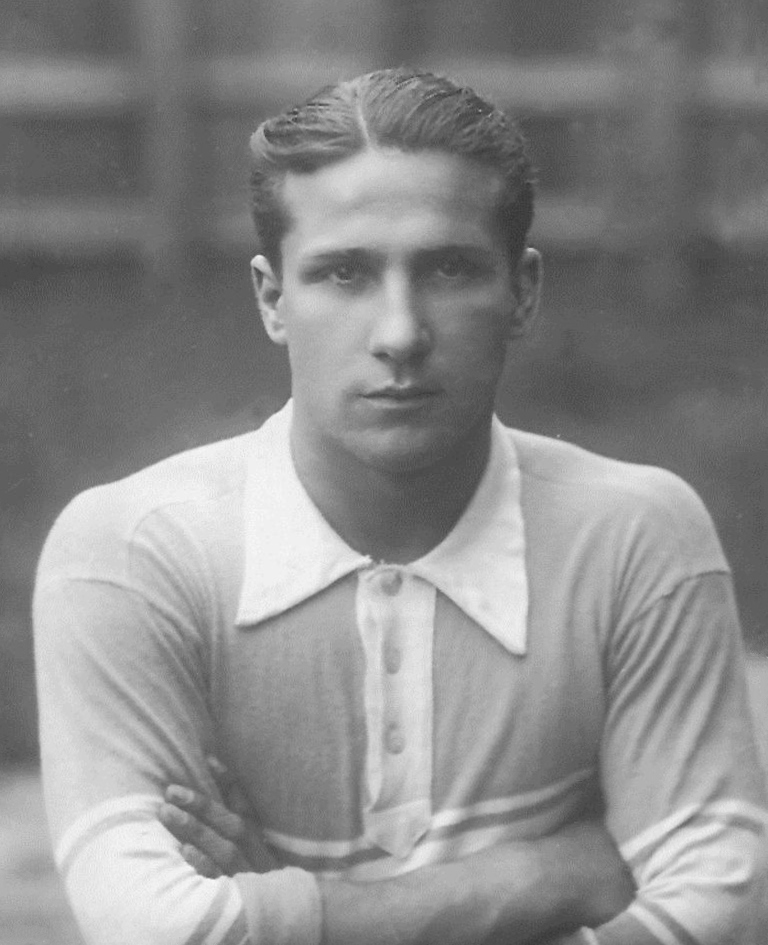
Iuliu Bodola, all time goalscorer of Club Atletic Oradea, with 109 goals.

During World War I (1914–1918), the football competitions were suspended, and the club suffered from the lack of activity. However, friendly matches and different sporting activities were held, even in that tough situation and with all the problems generated by world conflagration.

After the war, by the Treaty of Trianon Nagyvárad became part of Romania and officially became Oradea. The club and the city were still dominated by Hungarians. One of the most talented local players unearthed during this period was Elemér Berkessy (future FC Barcelona midfielder and Grimsby Town manager – in 1954 he became the first foreign manager in the English league).

The team joined the Romania national championship in 1921–22, but NAC – now also known as Clubul Atletic Oradea – was beaten in the "fight" for Town of Oradea champion title by Stăruința Oradea and then by Înțelegerea Oradea for the first few seasons, thus did not qualify for the national finals until 1923–24. They beat Universitatea Cluj and Jahn Cernăuți, before it was defeated in the final by Chinezul Timișoara – who would win the first six Romanian titles after the Great Union.

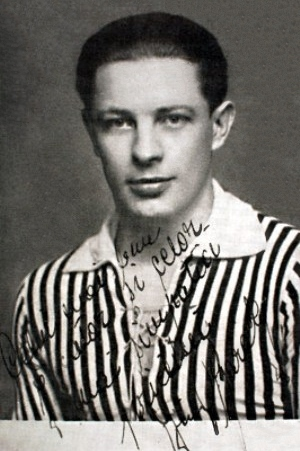
Iuliu Baratky, one of the most talented local players promoted by CA Oradea during the interwar period.

In 1932–33, after another spell confined to the regional tournament, CAO appeared in an expanded national competition, organized as two parallel leagues of seven teams; they finished second in their division, while local rivals Crișana Oradea came third in the other one. Two years later, with the national league reorganized into one division, CAO finished as runners-up, sandwiched between the two dominant clubs of the period, Ripensia Timișoara and Venus București. In 1938–39 the club was relegated to a restructured Divizia B, where they remained until the next war brought a strange upturn in fortunes.

In 1932, the management of the club decided that contact with football in other countries would help the development of the sport in Oradea. So, they undertook a twelve-match tour in France and Switzerland, during which they beat (score 5–2) Olympique Lillois, who would become in that season the inaugural French national champions, and obtained a 3–3 draw against Marseille. In the following year, the tour was in France and its North African colonies, and Oradea was spreading its fame with 21 victories and 4 draws, 110 goals scored and only 23 conceded. During the interwar period, CAO supplied eighteen Romanian internationals, however the majority were still ethnic Hungarians, Jews and Germans.

Players who starred in CAO's green and white stripes in this period included: Ferenc Rónay, the first ever goalscorer for the Romania national football team (against Yugoslavia in 1922); Nicolae Kovács, a forward who was one of only five men to play at the first three World Cups; Iuliu Baratky, a Hungarian from Oradea who opted to stay in Romania throughout the World War II, becoming a legend at Rapid București and Iuliu Bodola, a prolific goalscorer throughout the 1930s and into the 1940s. Bodola was transferred to Venus București in the Romanian capital in 1937.

Club Atletic Oradea's team that participated in the 1932 and 1933 Tours of France, Switzerland and North Africa was formed of: Ștefan Czinczer – Andrei Glanzmann, Iosif Bartha, Vasile Chiroiu, Iuliu Bodola, József Moravetz, Coloman Braun-Bogdan, Elemér Kocsis, Nicolae Kovács, Ferenc Rónay, Takács, Kraus, Nicolae Roșculeț and János Remmer (player and coach).

=== The Romanian-Hungarian champion (1940–1949) ===

CAO's 1943–44 squad.

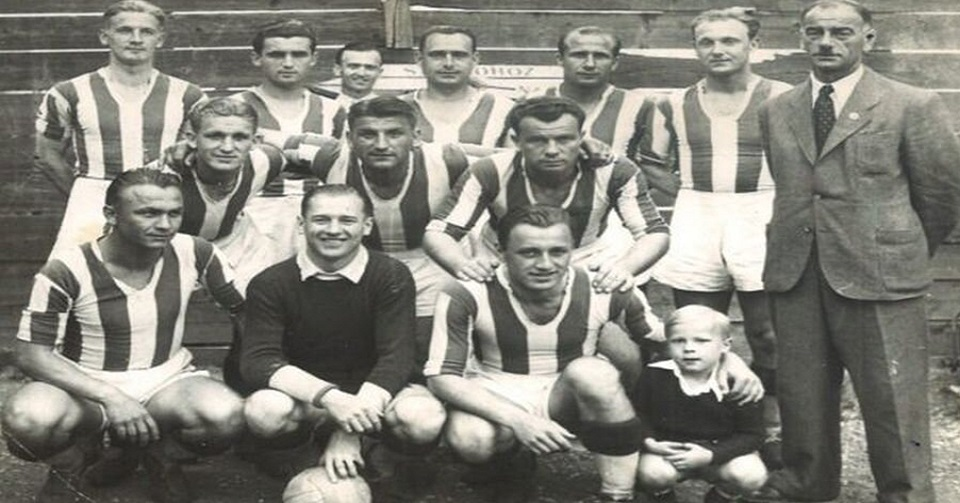
CA Oradea (1943–1944) – champion of Hungary, under the name of Nagyváradi AC

The Second Vienna Award in August 1940 annexed northern Transylvania, including Oradea, to Hitler's ally Hungary, while Romania was in the throes of its own right-wing military dictatorship. Many footballers of German or Hungarian origin who were at clubs in Bucharest, Timișoara, Arad or other parts of Romania, crossed the new border into this region and joined clubs in Oradea (Nagyvárad) or Cluj-Napoca (Kolozsvár); many of them signed for CAO – now, once again, known officially by its Hungarian name, NAC. After one season back in a Transylvanian league, NAC was promoted to the Hungarian top division. They finished second in 1942–43 and then in 1943–44 they became the first team from outside Budapest to win the Hungarian championship in its 43-year history, finishing a huge 13 points ahead of the second placed team Ferencváros.

The players who helped the club to this historic achievement included some major Hungarian and Romanian footballers of the age:

Gyula Lóránt was only 20 years old during NAC's title-winning season. He went on to play at Vasas, alongside László Kubala, who in 1949 fled the incoming Communist government and formed a team of Hungarian footballers who would play exhibition matches around Western Europe. Lóránt tried to escape and join Kubala, but was captured and interred, until the national team coach secured his release. Lóránt played for Hungary from 1949 until 1955, encompassing the greatest period of Hungarian success: he played in central defense for the Aranycsapat, the Mighty Magyars of the early 1950s. Besides winning the Romanian championship with UTA Arad and three more Hungarian titles with Honvéd, Lóránt went on to coach Bayern Munich in the late 1970s.

Iuliu Bodola or Gyula Bodola was an ethnic Hungarian born in what is now Brașov (then Brassó) in 1912. After a hugely successful seven-year spell as a prolific striker with CAO in the 1930s, and an equally fruitful three years at Venus București, he headed back to Oradea after the annexation of northern Transylvania by Hungary in 1940 and played for NAC for five years. After the war, he moved to Budapest and represented MTK Budapest. During his years in Romania he played 48 times for the Romania national football team, while from 1940 to 1943 he was a regular for Hungary national football team. Remarkably, he held the Romanian international goalscoring record for 66 years, from 1931 until 1997, when Gheorghe Hagi overtook his total of 30 goals. The municipal stadium in Oradea is now named after him.

CAO's 1948–49 squad.

József Pecsovszky known in Romania as Iosif Petschovschi or simply ‘Peci’, was another young member of the successful NAC team and was capped by Hungary at the age of 21. An attacking midfielder from Timișoara, of Hungarian extraction, Peci would later become a hero in Arad due to his starring role in UTA's three league titles in the 1940s, and then won two further championships with CCA București in the 1950s. His first game for Romania was against Hungary in Budapest in 1945, alongside Spielmann and Simatoc; he scored, but Hidegkuti and Puskás scored two each in a 7–2 win for the Magyars. Pecsovszky is one of the all-time greats of Romanian football.

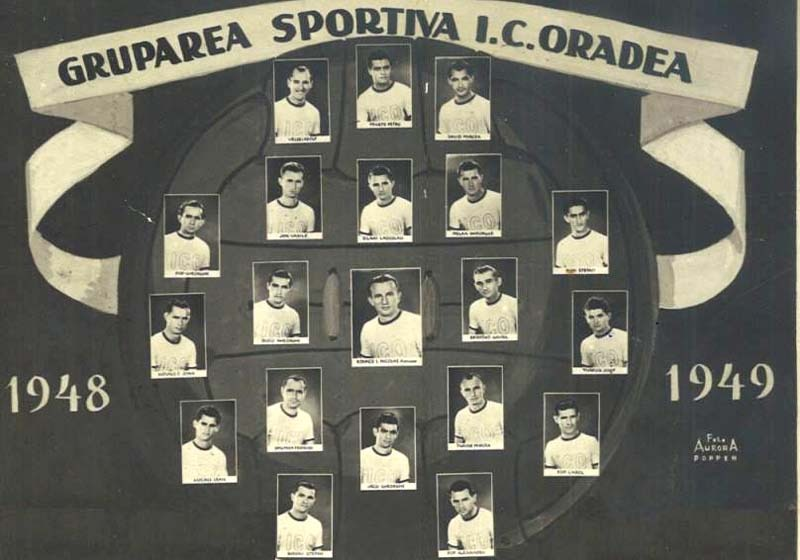
CA Oradea (1948–1949) – champion of Romania, under the name of IC Oradea

.

Francisc Spielmann, known in Hungary as Ferenc Sárvári, top-scorer for NAC in their title-winning season, with 23 goals; he was also the Hungarian player of the year.

The coach of the side throughout NAC's Hungarian period was 1920s CAO hot-shot Ferenc Rónay.

Gusztáv Juhász, also spelled (in Romania) as Gustav Iuhași, had been a regular in midfield for the Romania national football team since 1934, when he was also part of the CAO team that finished second in the Romanian championship. Together with Bodola and Rudolf Demetrovics, Juhász was part of the great Venus București team of the late 1930s.

Nicolae Simatoc, a reserve, was the only ethnic Romanian in the NAC squad; he was kept out of the starting line-up by the all-Timișorean midfield of Petschovschi, Demetrovits and Juhász. Simatoc eventually would go on to spend one season alongside Kubala at FC Barcelona, as well as two years at Inter Milan.

The 1944–45 Hungarian season was abandoned after four games due to the movement of the front, and NAC never played in the Hungarian league again: Northern Transylvania was occupied by Soviet and Romanian troops in 1944 and later reverted to Romania at the end of the war. NAC/CAO changed its name to Libertatea Oradea in 1948, and then to ICO Oradea the following year after the Soviet takeover of Romania. Petschovschi, Bodola and Ronnay left for Ferar Cluj – the third-placed team in Hungary in 1943–44 - while five of the championship-winning team would form the core of a new dominant power in Romania, ITA Arad.

By 1948–49, only three players remained from the great NAC team of 1943–44. And yet ICO Oradea became Romanian champions. Gheorghe Váczi, an ethnic Hungarian who was capped by Romania, contributed 21 goals in 26 matches. They also had names such as Vécsey, Spielmann, Vasile Ion, Bodo, Zilahi, Serfözö or Mircea David and the coach in that year was Nicolae Kovács, former CAO player and brother of the Ștefan Kovács who would coach Ajax to great success in the early 1970s.

=== The last performance and many changes (1950–1963) ===
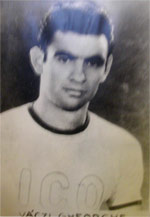
Gheorghe Váczi, goalscorer of the team during the 1948–49 title campaign.

After the title won with ICO, coach Nicolae Kovács returned on the banks of Bega river, in the city where he had learn the secrets of football, but this time as the coach of Știința Timisoara, (future Politehnica Timișoara). In the place of Kovács, his former teammate from the golden squad of NAC, Gusztáv Juhász, had returned, now as a head coach of the "white and greens". The squad had not undergone major changes, but the organization of Romanian football league system had taken, with the year 1950, the total course of the Soviet model. The championship starts to be played in the spring-autumn frequency, instead of autumn-spring, then all the teams were renamed after the new agreed model, for example, the clubs supported by the army end up wearing the abbreviations "CCA", "CA" or "ASA", the teams affiliated to the Miliția became Dinamo, in fact, Dinamo București created a real system of satellites during this period, on the entire territory of Romania, from Bacău to Brașov and from Cluj-Napoca to Slatina. Other football clubs were also renamed, as "Science" (for teams affiliated to Universities), "Miner", "Flame" or "Metal" (for football clubs affiliated to industry branches, depending on the industry they represented).

In 1951, the management of the football club opted for a new change of identity, ICO was renamed as Progresul Oradea, the second important step in the plan of blurring the identity of the club. This time the club's colors were also changed from "white and green" to "blue, bleu and white" similar with the colors combination used by Progresul București (which was named Spartac Banca RPR at the time), but often combined with white or red, in any case, a new identity and not too well defined, but also not so representative for Oradea of those times. In the 1951 season, however, Progresul, under the leadership of the same Gusztáv Juhász, achieved a rank beyond expectations, occupying the last step of the podium after CCA București and Dinamo București. In that team of Oradea appeared among others, the veterans Mircea David, Adolf Vécsey or János Kovács II (from the past teams of CAO/NAC), the younger Vasile Ion, Ladislau Zilahi, Gavril Serfözö, Gheorghe Bodo or Gheorghe Váczi (from the ICO generation of 1949), but also the defender Iuliu Darok (a product of Dermata Cluj and already Romanian international since 1947) or the new "terrible child" of Crișana, Iuliu Kiss, a product of Metalul Oradea Football Academy (former Stăruința), a club that also gave other "heavy names" to the Romanian football, such as Iosif Bartha or Iuliu Barátky, among others.

After a 1952 season that was ended on an honorable 6th place, under the management of Dincă Schileru, Progresul lost some important pieces, such as: Adolf Vécsey, Vasile Ion, Gheorghe Melan, Gavril Serfözö or Gheorghe Váczi, after it already lost Mircea David and János Kovács II at the end of 1951 (both retired). After two seasons, in which former important players of CAO, such as Elemér Kocsis or Iuliu Barátky (in his second term and the last one as manager of CAO) took the lead of the team, Progresul relegated under the command of the same Dincă Schileru, who was signed in the summer of 1954 in order to save the team from relegation, but relegated from the bottom of the league table. The situation of Oradea's football club seemed problematic, but Progresul was unexpectedly well organized, signing in the spring of 1955 a new manager, its former player (newly retired, at that time) Ladislau Zilahi.

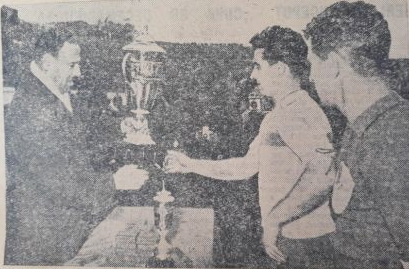
Progresul Oradea, lifting the 1956 Romanian Cup.

As a Divizia B team, Progresul Oradea reached the 1955 Cupa României final, which was lost with 3–6 în front of CCA București. The following year as a Divizia A team, the club won the 1956 Cupa României final, after a 2–0 win against Divizia B team Energia Câmpia Turzii. The winning squad of Progresul was managed by Camil Scherz and formed of the following players: Adalbert Gébner – Gheorghe Kromely, Andor Tyirják, Gheorghe Barcu, Iosif Bartha, Ștefan Cuc, Ludovic Tóth, Ladislau Köszegi, Alexandru Karikas, Ladislau Vlad and Iosif Mészáros.

However, the club's destiny had been sealed some time before this demotion, when the communist leadership of the Oradea Region decided that a new and "clean" club was needed, without a too twisted, cosmopolitan past or that could remind of times before the World War II. Thus, on 1 April 1958, Crișul Oradea Sports Club (the future FC Bihor Oradea) was established, with red and blue as the main colors. In the summer of the same year, 1958, Progresul Oradea was renamed again, this time as CS Oradea. For a total misleading of the public, the logos of the two clubs were now almost identical, and the colors of CS Oradea (CAO) had also become red and blue, both teams playing on the same stadium, Iuliu Bodola Stadium. After a brief period as CS Oradea (1958–1962), the name of the football club was changed again, this time, the local authorities opted for CSM Crișana Oradea, another confusing choice, because this name was already used by a completely different club (see Crișana Oradea), before World War II, also a bitter rival of CA Oradea. After yo-yoing between the top two divisions for a few years (Rónay returned as coach in 1962–63), in 1963 the club was dissolved. That same year another club from Oradea won promotion to the top division, Crișul Oradea, a club which was mostly known as FC Bihor Oradea. The city of Oradea blazed brightly on the region's football firmament, with some of Hungary and Romania's greatest players of the age – one cup, and a league title in two countries – but it is now very much in the shadows: FC Bihor was dissolved on 12 January 2016 after a stormy history and in the spring of 2017 this dissolution subsequently realizing a strange reversed situation of the early 1960s.

=== New era, the same spirit (2017–present) ===
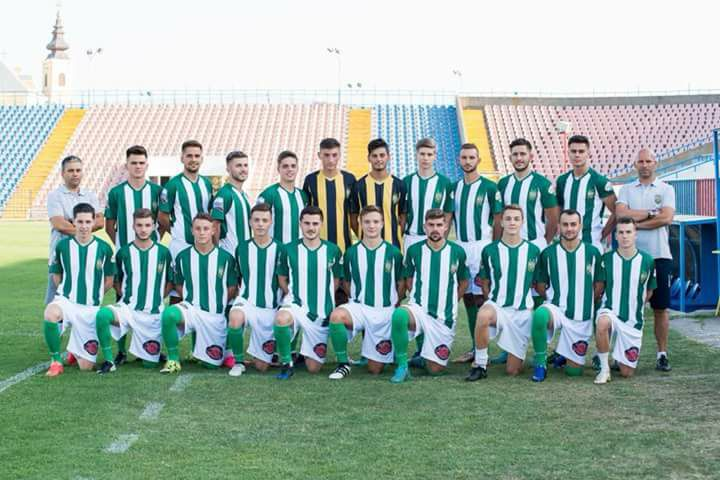
CA Oradea (2017–2018), first squad that played under CAO's colors after 54 years of inactivity.

On 22 December 2016 CAO 1910 Association was founded, then on 17 March 2017 the association changed its status as a sports association named: Asociația Club Sportiv CAO 1910, thus marking the refoundation of the white and green team. The refounding of the club was followed by a marketing promotion period, in which, among other things, the official website of the club and the Facebook official page were launched.

Then, on 28 July 2017 a partnership was signed between CAO and CSM Oradea, the team that took over the FC Bihor Oradea youth academy after its dissolution, but which didn't have a senior squad, so through this partnership CSM Oradea ensured a continuity for the youth players at senior level and CAO assured a youth academy. In the same period the team was enrolled in Liga V.

At the end of the season CAO had an impressive ranking line, 24 wins, one draw and only one defeat, 146 goals scored and 21 conceded, 73 points, with 15 more than their main promotion rival, Dinamo Oradea. After the promotion, "the white and greens" continued their strategy to promote young players, being ranked 2nd in the Liga IV, Bihor series, at the end of the 2018–19 season, 13 points away from the champions, CSC Sânmartin, a team with many players of certain quality and experience, as Salif Nogo, Alexandru Sorian or Florin Pop, among others.

The second season of Liga IV and the third one after the refoundation was beyond the expectations for the "white and greens". CA Oradea won all his matches in the autumn campaign, scored 69 goals and conceded only 6, leading the league table with a total of 45 points. The season was suspended during the winter break, due to COVID-19 pandemic outbreak, then on 21 May 2020, CAO was crowned as the champions of Liga IV, Bihor Series based on the results of the matches that were played in the autumn of 2019. The promotion play-offs were played on the Municipal Stadium in Zalău, and CAO was assigned in a group of three teams, together with CSM Satu Mare and Someșul Dej. CAO lost 1–3 against Satu Mare, than won 2–1 against Someșul, being ranked 2nd. Finally all the teams from that group were promoted to 2020–21 Liga III, due to the Liga III competition format changes.

In 2020, Oradea Municipality and APTOR (Local Public Association for Tourism) entered in the association, along with the already existing Oradea Renaștem Împreună Association (the association that reunite the founding members, the private sponsors and which owns Club Atletic Oradea brands, registered at the Romanian State Office for Inventions and Trademarks). At the end of the first season spent in the national divisions, after 58 years of absence, CA Oradea was ranked on an honorable 4th place, out of 10, then in the summer of 2021, the club announced that will be a break up between the owners (Oradea Municipality, APTOR and Oradea Renaștem Împreună) due to a difference of opinion between the public and the private parts. Municipality of Oradea wanted a merger between the two brands, Club Atletic Oradea (owned by Oradea Renaștem Împreună) and FC Bihor Oradea (owned by the Municipality), while the private side did not agree with this and wanted to continue the Club Atletic Oradea project. The owners agreed that the private management of the club will retire from the executive management and the association will work as Club Atletic Oradea only for another season, being expected an exchange of places through which FC Bihor (supported by the public owners), will reach the third tier, while the private owners (Oradea Renaștem Împreună, the official owner of the Club Atletic Oradea brands) will continue to support the white and green club, but a division below, back in the fourth league.

CA Oradea had a good 2021–22 season and was ranked 2nd, out of 10, qualifying for Liga II promotion play-offs, where it was eliminated in the semi-final round, by Corvinul Hunedoara, 2–4 on aggregate. On 24 June 2022, Club Atletic Oradea announced officially the break up, and that the club will continue in the county leagues, under the ownership of the private management, which also own the Club Atletic Oradea brands, registered at the Romanian State Office for Inventions and Trademarks. On the place of CAO, in the Liga III will play the club owned by the Municipality of Oradea and APTOR. CAO restarted from the 4th division and after a first season of rebuilding, in which the team was ranked only 9th, it started to grow up season by season, being ranked 3rd (2023–24) and achieving the Romanian Cup county rounds final, then 2nd (2024–25) and winning the Bihor County Cup, also playing a Bihor County Supercup final, but lost in front of Bihorul Beiuș.

== Crest and colours ==
=== Crest ===
Club Atletic Oradea's first emblem, used between 1910 and 1919, was an almost replica of River Plate crest, the differences consist of a green sash instead of a red one, and also the initials NAC (Nagyváradi Atlétikai Club) wrote on diagonal, in opposition with the sash. For the next 20 years (1920–1940), the club used the first logo that introduced the green stripes, positioned on a white background, inside of a brown circle. On the logo were the two initials, CAO (Club Atletic Oradea) and NAC, as a symbol of the Romanian-Hungarian culture and friendship that existed around the club.

Historical crest used between 1920 and 1940.

In 1930, at the 20th anniversary of the club, the administrative staff decided to make a special logo. They modified the current logo, changing the places between the white background and green lines. At the time, the club was in the Hungarian championship, so on the top of the crest appeared only NAC, as an abbreviation, wrote with gold colour. On the sides appeared the laurels and on the bottom of the logo, on two different ribbons were marked the year of foundation (1910) and the current year (1930).

Crest used between 2017 and 2021.

The last form of the logo with Hungarian influences was during the 1940s, with the same white and green stripes, now having some gold lines between them. On the top of the logo was written Nagyváradi AC, on the bottom, the year of foundation 1910 and in the middle was placed a local coat of arms.

After 1945, the club was moved back in Romania, but this time under the communist regime installed by the Soviets, fact that led to the removal of any Hungarian names. The club's name, as well as the crest, were frequently changed, not less than five times in the next 20 years. Some of them were lost in time, but for example, between 1951 and 1958, when the club was known under the name of Progresul Oradea used a triangular logo, with a bleu, blue and white water tower in the middle. On the top of the crest appeared the name of the club, in red colour.

In 2017, after the refoundation, the club moved back to the name of Club Atletic Oradea and the original white and green colours. The new logo uses a rounded shape, with a green background and a gold outline. Above the logo are two golden stars representing the two national titles won by the club in Hungary (1944) and Romania (1949), inside the shape appears with white letters the name of the club and the year of foundation, as well as a stylized golden shape of the Oradea's Fortress.

In 2022, the club introduced a more modern variant of the logo used in the interwar period. The new logo is composed of a white shield, with green vertical stripes, having a geometric shape inspired by the emblems used both in the interwar period and in the first part of the 1940s. At the top of the logo, there are the two abbreviations so well known and confused with the club's history: CAO (Club Atletic Oradea) and NAC (Nagyváradi Atlétikai Club), a symbol of diversity and good cooperation between the main peoples who contributed to the development of Oradea. The new logo also borrows two elements from the last logo (used between 2017 and 2021), the two green stars, representing the titles won in Hungary (1944) and Romania (1949), as well as the year of founding, 1910.

=== Colours and kits ===
The original colours of the club are white and green, this combination was used almost regularly with the exception of some periods, in which colours such as bleu, blue or white were printed on the kits.

The classic home kit of Club Atletic Oradea consists of a white body with green stripes, white shorts and green or white socks. After the refoundation, the club used in the first season a printed form of the original kits used by the club, as a symbolic connecting bridge of the current side with the glorious history of the squad from the banks of the Crișul Repede river. Starting with the 2019–20 season, CAO also adopted a red and blue kit, current colors of Oradea and Bihor County, city and region which it represents.

Selection of CAO kits through history
The white shirt with green stripes, white shorts and white-green socks. Worn 1943–1944	The white shirt with three green stripes, white shorts and greens socks. Worn 2017–2018	The white shirt with three green stripes, white shorts and white socks. Home kit worn 2018–2019	The black shirt with white vertical line, green insertion and white socks. Away kit worn 2018–2019

== Grounds ==
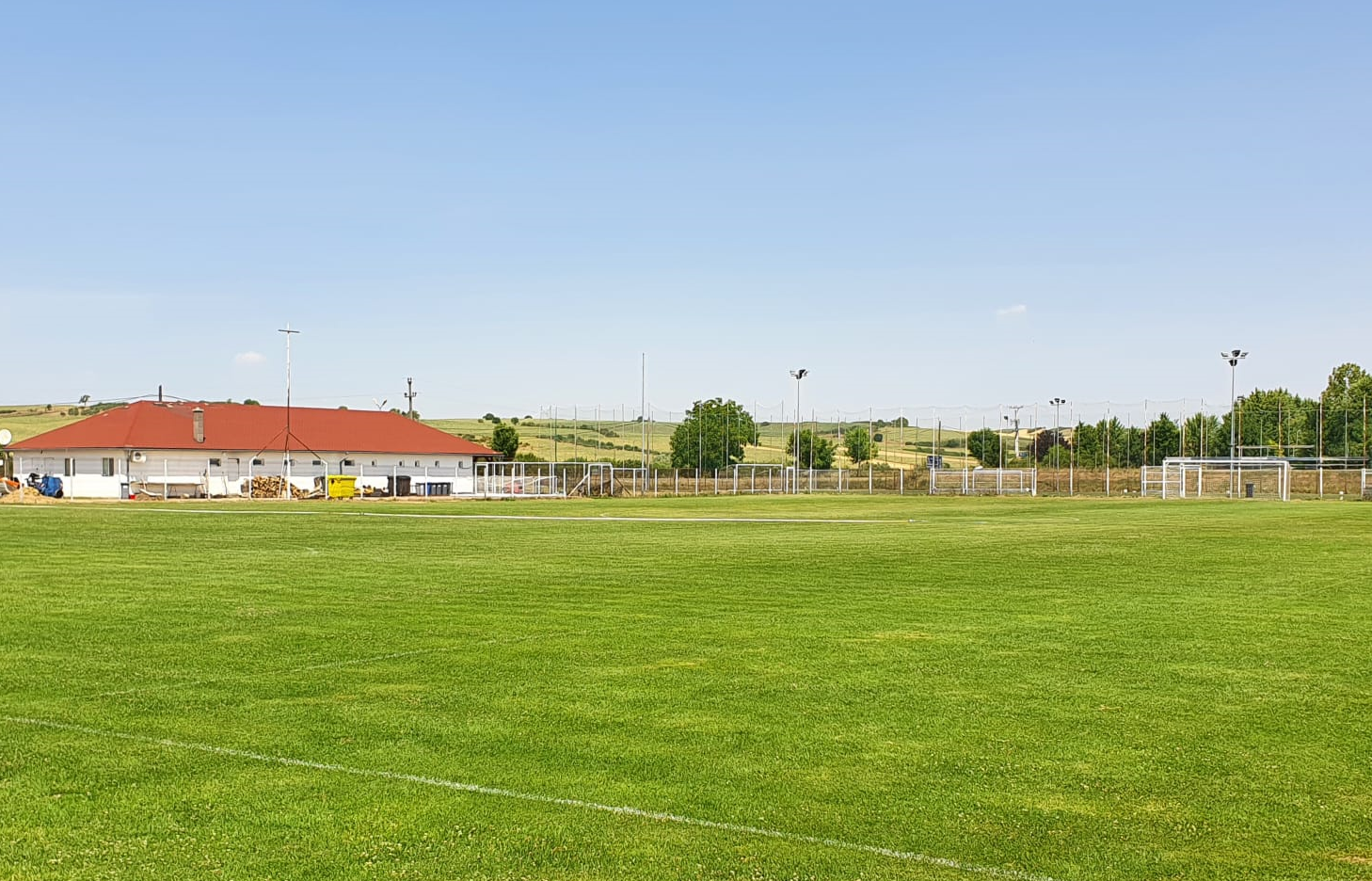
Paleu Sports Base, the current training ground of the club.

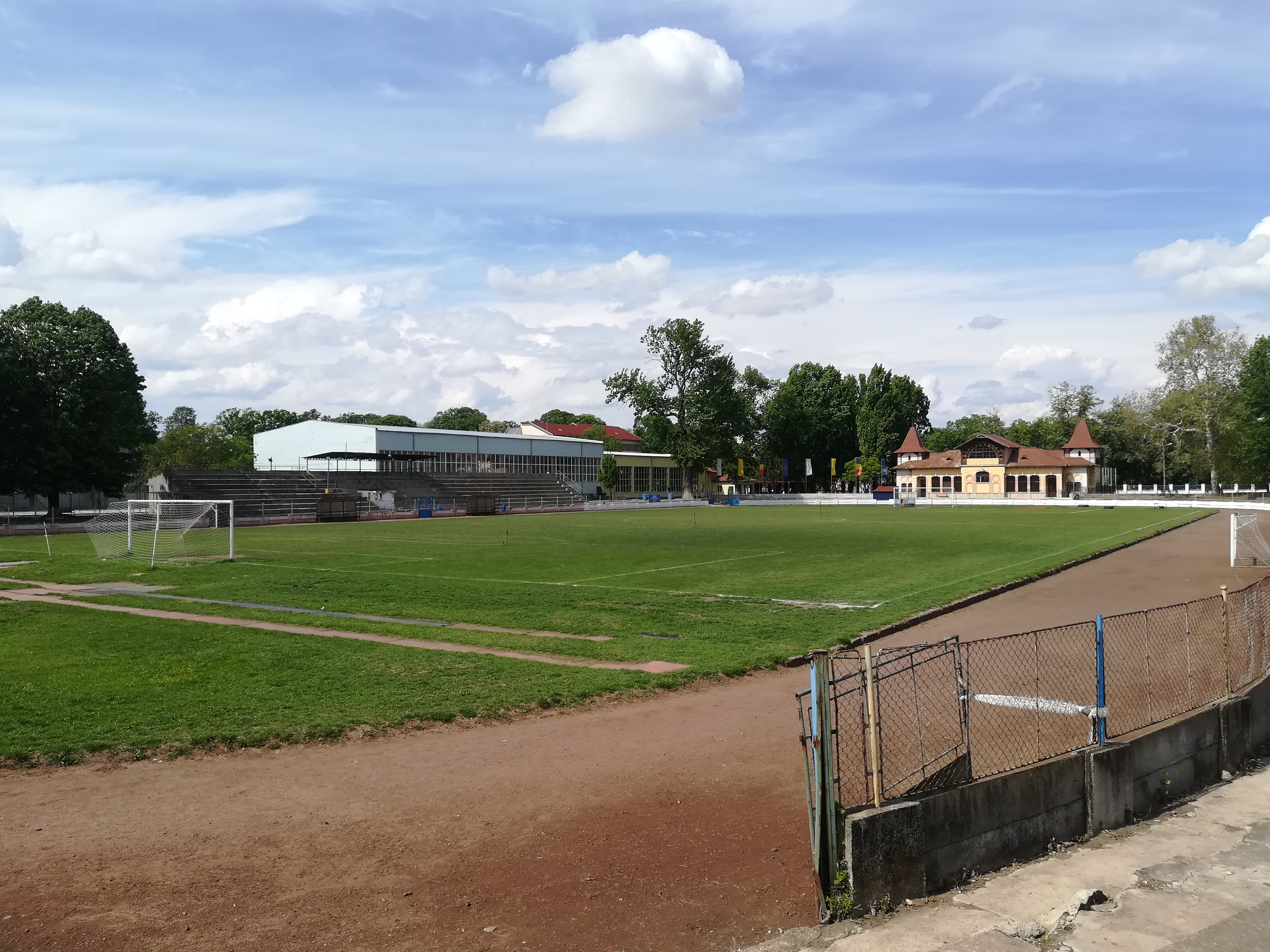
Tineretului Stadium, the first and current home ground of Club Atletic Oradea.

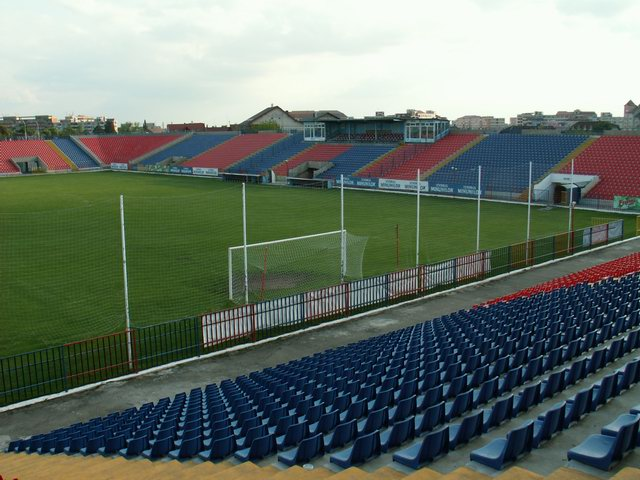
Iuliu Bodola Stadium, the most used home ground of the club.

In the first 14 years of their existence (1910–1924), "the white and greens" used to play the home matches on the historical stadium of the city, Tineretului Stadium, known at that time as Rhédey Garden, with a capacity of 3,000 people. The stadium was replaced as the first ground with the opening of the new stadium, Municipal Stadium, in 1924. Until its dissolution, in 1963, CAO played its home matches on the Municipal Stadium, with a capacity of approx. 10,000 people, at that time.

In 2017, after the re-establishment of the club, "the white and greens" started to play on the same Municipal Stadium, now known under the name of Iuliu Bodola Stadium, with a capacity of 11,155 on seats, the biggest from Bihor County and named after Iuliu Bodola, CAO's great player of the 1930s and 1940s. The home ground of CAO was established here due to the partnership with CSM Oradea and the financial support of the Municipality of Oradea, the owner of the arena. In the summer of 2022, CAO and the Municipality broke up the partnership and the team moved to Paleu Sports Base, in the Oradea Metropolitan Area. In the past, the arena was the home ground of local team FC Paleu.

In the summer of 2025, Paleu Sports Base entered in an extensive renovation process, so Club Atletic Oradea returned for the official matches at the historic Tineretului Stadium in Oradea, with a capacity of 3,000 people (2,900 on terraces and 100 on seats).

== Support ==
Club Atletic Oradea had the most important fan base in the city of Oradea, until its dissolution in 1963. The "sleeping giant" was revived in 2017, after 54 years of existence, but despite the skepticism from the beginning, the fan-base was fastly organized, mostly due to socios program of the club. In a short period of time an ultras group was also formed, under the name of "Galeria Verzilor" (The Greens).

=== Rivalries ===
CA Oradea's historical bitter rivals are Ripensia Timișoara (since the 1930s), but has also other important rivalries with teams based in the west part of Romania such as: UTA Arad or Politehnica Timișoara, rivalries established during the 1950s. In the past, CAO also had important rivals at the local level, matches against teams such as Stăruința Oradea or Crișana Oradea being recognized for their intensity.

In the modern times, Club Atletic Oradea supporters maintain a bitter rivalry with Oradea-based FC Bihor Oradea, phoenix club of FC Bihor (1958). The history of FC Bihor and CAO relationship is complicated and with a lot of ups and downs, the establishment of the original FC Bihor, in 1958, meant the death of the white-greens, situation that was almost repeated in 2022. A feeling of deja vu appeared when the Municipality of Oradea opted for the establishment of a new FC Bihor Oradea, but this time, CAO survived due to its private management and resources, but was needed to enroll a league below, in the Liga IV. In the modern era, an important local rivalry, but of lower intensity, is against Lotus Băile Felix.

== Youth program ==
In 2017, after the re-foundation, CAO formed its academy following the partnership signed with CSM Oradea, the club which took over the youth academy of Bihor Oradea after its dissolution in 2016. Between 2020 and 2021, CAO–CSM Academy was coordinated by Stelian Farcău and Florin Farcaș (who was also the manager of CA Oradea's senior squad) and the coaches were Claudiu Mutu, Sorin Todea, Horea Rădulescu, Sorin Pop, Lucian Ciocan and Adrian Gongolea. In the summer of 2022, Club Atletic Oradea and CSM Oradea broke the partnership they had, "the white and greens" starting to form their own youth program, while CSM Oradea, supported by the Municipality of Oradea, starting to form their own senior squad, mainly with players that played for CAO.

Starting with the summer of 2022, Club Atletic Oradea enrolled an U19 team in the County League, team that was ranked 3rd at the end of the season, then in the following season the U19 surprised the world of local football with and incredible campaign, under the command of a new coach, Andrei Haș, former captain of the team and won the County League, after a season full of drama. In the summer of 2024, CAO started a partnership with NAC Labdarúgó Egyesület, a club that promotes "white and green" values at the kid groups (between U9 and U15). At this moment, CAO has two youth squads (U19 and U15), while NAC has the kids groups, between U9 and U15.

== Honours ==
=== Romania ===
==== Leagues ====
- Liga I
  - Winners (1): 1948–49
  - Runners-up (2): 1923–24, 1934–35
- Liga II
  - Winners (2): 1955, 1961–62
  - Runners-up (1): 1938–39
- Liga III
  - Runners-up (1): 2021–22
- Liga IV – Bihor County
  - Winners (1): 2019–20
  - Runners-up (2): 2018–19, 2024–25
- Liga V – Bihor County
  - Winners (1): 2017–18
- Regional Championship
  - Winners (2): 1923–24, 1924–25

==== Cups ====
- Cupa României
  - Winners (1): 1956
  - Runners-up (1): 1955
- Cupa României – Regional stage
  - Runners-up (1): 2026–27
- Cupa României – Bihor County
  - Winners (2): 2024–25, 2025–26
  - Runners-up (1): 2023–24
- Supercup – Bihor County
  - Runners-up (1): 2025

=== Hungary ===
==== Leagues ====
- Nemzeti Bajnokság I
  - Winners (1): 1943–44
  - Runners-up (1): 1942–43
- Nemzeti Bajnokság II
  - Winners (1): 1940–41
- Regional Championship
  - Winners (1): 1913–14

== Players ==
=== First team squad ===
As of 8 September 2026

Note: Flags indicate national team as defined under FIFA eligibility rules; some limited exceptions apply. Players may hold more than one non-FIFA nationality.

No.	Pos.	Nation	Player
4	DF	ROU	Mihnea Moș
5	DF	ROU	Antonio Zghibolț
7	MF	ROU	Alexandru Brisc (on loan from Sântandrei)
8	MF	ROU	Antonio Marcu
9	FW	ROU	Raul Dume
10	FW	ROU	Sergiu Ciocan (Captain)
11	MF	ROU	Paul Chiș-Toie
12	GK	ROU	Raul Tabora (on loan from Cheresig)
13	MF	ROU	Francesco Petraro (on loan from Aleșd)
14	DF	ROU	Sebastian Oșvat
15	DF	ROU	Raul Ardelean (Vice-Captain)

No.	Pos.	Nation	Player
17	MF	ROU	Mario Vesa
18	MF	ROU	Florin Vesa
19	DF	ROU	Paul Acatrinei (on loan from LPS Bihorul)
22	DF	ROU	Horia Lazăr
27	GK	ROU	Florin Bălaj (on loan from Biharia)
35	MF	ROU	Mateo Căprescu
43	GK	ROU	Alexandru Lucuța (on loan from LPS Bihorul)
89	DF	ROU	Lucian Mănoiu (3rd captain)
90	DF	ROU	Andrei Nagy
98	MF	ROU	Casian Borza (on loan from LPS Bihorul)

=== Out on loan ===
Note: Flags indicate national team as defined under FIFA eligibility rules; some limited exceptions apply. Players may hold more than one non-FIFA nationality.

No.	Pos.	Nation	Player
—	MF	ROU	Krisztián Horvat (at Bănișor-Peceiu)
—	MF	ROU	Denis Schipko (at Barcău Nușfalău)

No.	Pos.	Nation	Player
—	MF	ROU	Marian Varga (at Cociuba Mare)

=== U19 squad (Primavera) ===
As of 8 September 2026

Note: Flags indicate national team as defined under FIFA eligibility rules; some limited exceptions apply. Players may hold more than one non-FIFA nationality.

No.	Pos.	Nation	Player
3	DF	ROU	Kristóf Orbán
6	DF	ROU	Nándor Perei
16	DF	ROU	Mădălin Găitan
20	MF	ROU	Ákos Kovács
22	MF	ROU	Ștefan Tămaș
23	DF	ROU	Daniel Rostaș
24	DF	ROU	Bence Serfőző
25	MF	ROU	Károly Pintye
26	MF	ROU	Denis Purdea
27	GK	ROU	Milán Markus
29	FW	ROU	Alex Herman

No.	Pos.	Nation	Player
30	GK	ROU	Dominik Horváth
33	DF	ROU	Luca Lucuș (on loan from Oșorhei)
77	MF	ROU	Dávid Kondor
85	FW	ROU	Casian Amara
93	MF	ROU	David Madar
94	DF	ROU	Denis Tonț (on loan from CS Crișana)
95	MF	ROU	Dávid Balog
96	MF	ROU	Andrei Petruț
97	FW	ROU	Alex Gug
99	DF	ROU	Alexandru Susa

== Club officials ==
=== Board of directors ===
Role	Name
President	(Romania) Florin Mal
Vice-president	(Romania) Marcel Boldiș
Sporting director	(Romania) Marius Chereji
Team manager	(Romania) Ionuț Șereș
Youth center manager	(Romania) Csaba Opre

=== Current technical staff ===
Role	Name
Head coach	(Romania) Lucian Stance
Assistant coach	(Romania) Imre Lukács
U19 coach	(Romania) Norbert Király
U15 coach	(Romania) Beniamin Kiss
U10 coach	(Romania) Dávid Király
Club Doctor	(Romania) Marian Flița

== Shirt sponsors and manufacturers ==
Period	Kit manufacturer	Period	Shirt partner
1910–1963	Unknown	1910–1963	None
2017–	(Romania) Westiment	2017–2018	None
2017–	(Romania) Westiment	2018–2021	Herald, Irnord, MarClean
2017–	(Romania) Westiment	2021–2022	Eporoton, Interioo, SAM
2017–	(Romania) Westiment	2022–	Reinert, Interioo, StarStone
2025–	(Italy) Macron	2025–	None

== Chronology of names ==
Name	Period
Nagyváradi Atlétikai Club (NAC)	1910–1919
Club Atletic Oradea (CAO)	1919–1940
Nagyváradi Atlétikai Club (NAC)	1940–1945
Libertatea Oradea	1945–1948
Întreprinderea Comunală Oradea (ICO)	1948–1951
Progresul Oradea	1951–1958
CS Oradea	1958–1961
Crișana Oradea	1961–1963
Club Atletic Oradea (CAO)	2017–present

== League history ==
Season	Tier	Division	Place	Notes	Cupa României
2026–27	4	Liga IV (BH)	TBD		Regional final
2025–26	4	Liga IV (BH)	2nd		Regional stage
2024–25	4	Liga IV (BH)	2nd		County stage – Winners
2023–24	4	Liga IV (BH)	3rd		County stage – Runners-up
2022–23	4	Liga IV (BH)	9th		
2021–22	3	Liga III (Seria X)	2nd	Withdrew after season	Round of 32
2020–21	3	Liga III (Seria X)	4th		
2019–20	4	Liga IV (BH)	1st (C, P)	Promoted	
2018–19	4	Liga IV (BH)	2nd		
2017–18	5	Liga V (Serie I, BH)	1st (C, P)	Promoted	
1963–2017	Club Inactive				
1962–63	1	Divizia A	13th (R)	Relegated; club dissolved	Round of 32
1961–62	2	Divizia B (Serie III)	1st (C, P)	Promoted	
1960–61	2	Divizia B (Serie III)	5th		Round of 32
1959–60	2	Divizia B (Serie III)	3rd		
1958–59	2	Divizia B (Serie I)	14th		
1957–58	1	Divizia A	12th (R)	Relegated	Semi-finals
1956	1	Divizia A	8th		Winners
1955	2	Divizia B (Serie II)	1st (C, P)	Promoted	Runners-up
1954	1	Divizia A	14th (R)	Relegated	Round of 32
1953	1	Divizia A	12th		Round of 32
1952	1	Divizia A	6th		Semi-finals
1951	1	Divizia A	3rd		Round of 16
1950	1	Divizia A	7th		Semi-finals
1948–49	1	Divizia A	1st (C)	Champions	Semi-finals
1947–48	1	Divizia A	6th		Round of 32
1946–47	1	Divizia A	8th		
1945–46	No national championship held				
1944–45	1	NB I	—	Season abandoned after four rounds	
1943–44	1	NB I	1st (C)	Champions	
1942–43	1	NB I	2nd		
1941–42	1	NB I	5th		
1940–41	2	NB II (Kolozsvár Group)	1st (C, P)	Promoted	
1939–40	2	Divizia B (Serie I)	5th		
1938–39	2	Divizia B (West Series – Group South)	2nd		
1937–38	1	Divizia A (Group 1)	7th (R)	Relegated	Round of 16
1936–37	1	Divizia A	6th		Round of 32
1935–36	1	Divizia A	4th		Round of 16
1934–35	1	Divizia A	2nd		Quarter-finals
1933–34	1	Divizia A (Group 2)	3rd		Round of 32
1932–33	1	Divizia A (Group 2)	2nd		
1931–32	2	Regional Championship (Oradea)	2nd	Qualified for Divizia Națională	
1930–31	2	Regional Championship (Oradea)	3rd		
1927–30	2	Regional Championship (Oradea)	—	Did not qualify for national stage	
1926–27	2	Regional Championship (Oradea)	2nd		
1925–26	2	Regional Championship (Oradea)	2nd		
1924–25	1	Divizia A	QF	Regional champions; national quarter-finals	
1923–24	1	Divizia A	2nd	Regional champions; national runners-up	
1922–23	2	Regional Championship (Oradea/Satu Mare)	—	Did not qualify for national stage	
1921–22	2	Regional Championship (Oradea/Satu Mare)	2nd		
1921	2	Regional Championship (Oradea)	1st (C)	Regional champions	
1914–20	WW II				
1913–14	—	Hungarian Regional Championship (East Zone – Nagyvárad Group)	1st	Nagyvárad group champions	
1912–13	—	Hungarian Regional Championship (East Zone – Nagyvárad Group)	1st	Nagyvárad group champions	
1911–12	—	Hungarian Regional Championship (Central Zone)	2nd	First official league season	
1910–11	No official league participation				

== Notable former players ==
The footballers enlisted below have had international cap(s) for their respective countries at junior and/or senior level.

Romania

- (Romania) Iuliu Borbely
- (Romania) Vasile Chiroiu
- (Romania) Mircea David
- (Romania) Anton Fernbach-Ferenczi
- (Romania) Andrei Glanzmann
- (Romania) Gusztáv Juhász
- (Romania) Elemér Kocsis
- (Romania) Cornel Orza
- (Romania) Ferenc Rónay
- (Romania) Gavril Serfözö
- (Romania) Nicolae Simatoc
- (Romania) Iosif Stibinger
- (Romania) Gheorghe Váczi
- (Romania) Ladislau Zilahi

Hungary

- (Hungary) Elemér Berkessy
- (Hungary) Gyula Lóránt
- (Hungary) Andor Ónody

Romania-Hungary

- (Romania) (Hungary) Iuliu Baratky
- (Romania) (Hungary) Iuliu Bodola
- (Romania) (Hungary) Nicolae Kovács
- (Romania) (Hungary) Francisc Mészáros
- (Romania) (Hungary) József Pecsovszky
- (Romania) (Hungary) Francisc Spielmann
- (Romania) (Hungary) Albert Ströck

== Notable former managers ==
- (Romania) (Hungary) Iuliu Baratky
- (Romania) (Hungary) Nicolae Kovács
- (Hungary) Lajos Remmer
- (Romania) Ferenc Rónay
- (Romania) Camil Schertz
- (Romania) Ladislau Zilahi

== Management ==
- (Hungary) dr. Emil Jonas (1910–1911)
- (Hungary) dr. Sándor Dénes (1911–1913)
- (Hungary) dr. Emil Adorján (1913–1919)
- (Hungary) (Romania) János Pelle (1921–1930)
- (Hungary) (Romania) István Kovács & Gyula Grünstein (1930–1932)
- (Hungary) (Romania) János Pelle & Ernö Popper (1932–1933)
- (Romania) Justin Filip (1937–1938)
- (Hungary) (Romania) János Pelle (1938–1939)
- (Hungary) Rezső Jeney & Béla Jancsó (1940–1941)
- (Hungary) Rezső Jeney & Károly Krüger (1941–1943)
- (Hungary) Gyula Cseuz (1944–1945)
- (Romania) Ștefan Hittner (1945–1948)
- (Romania) dr. Ardelean (1962–1963)
- (Romania) Florin Mal (2017–2021)
- (Romania) Laurențiu Danșa (2021–2022)
- (Romania) Florin Mal (2022–present)
