= Ferenc Rónay =

Hungarian-Romanian footballer and manager (1900–1967)

Ferenc Rónay / Francisc Rónay
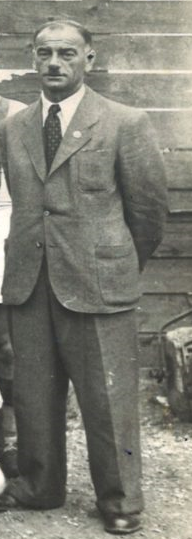

Personal information
- Date of birth: 29 April 1900
- Place of birth: Arad, Austria-Hungary (now Romania)
- Date of death: 6 April 1967 (aged 66)
- Place of death: Târgu Mureș, Romania
- Position: Forward

Youth career
- 1912–1920: AMEF Arad

Senior career*
Years	Team	Apps	(Gls)
1920–1935	CA Oradea	120	(133)
1935–1936	Craiovan Craiova		
1936–1937	CA Oradea	4	(4)
1937	Electrica Oradea		
Total		124	(137)

International career
1922–1932	Romania	8	(3)

Managerial career
- 1936: CA Oradea
- 1940–1944: Nagyváradi AC
- 1947: Romania
- 1947: Rapid București
- 1948–1949: CSM Mediaş
- 1950: Steaua București
- 1952: CA Câmpulung Moldovenesc
- 1953: Steaua București
- 1954: Steaua București
- 1954–1959: Rapid București
- 1960–1962: Crișana Oradea
- * Club domestic league appearances and goals

Ferenc Rónay or Francisc Rónay (29 April 1900 – 6 April 1967) was a Hungarian-Romanian footballer and manager.

Rónay was the first ever scorer of the Romania national team, giving them the equaliser against Yugoslavia in their debut, part of the 1922 King Alexander's Cup. Romania went on to win the game 2–1 thanks to Aurel Guga. He was also part of Romania's squad for the football tournament at the 1924 Summer Olympics, but he did not play in any matches. He played for most of his career in the Club Atletic Oradea jersey, a club for which he played in 120 matches and scored 133 goals. Rónay was a football star of the 1920s in Romania and a fearsome forward.

== Honours ==
=== Manager ===
Steaua București

- Cupa României: 1950
