= Stăruința Oradea =

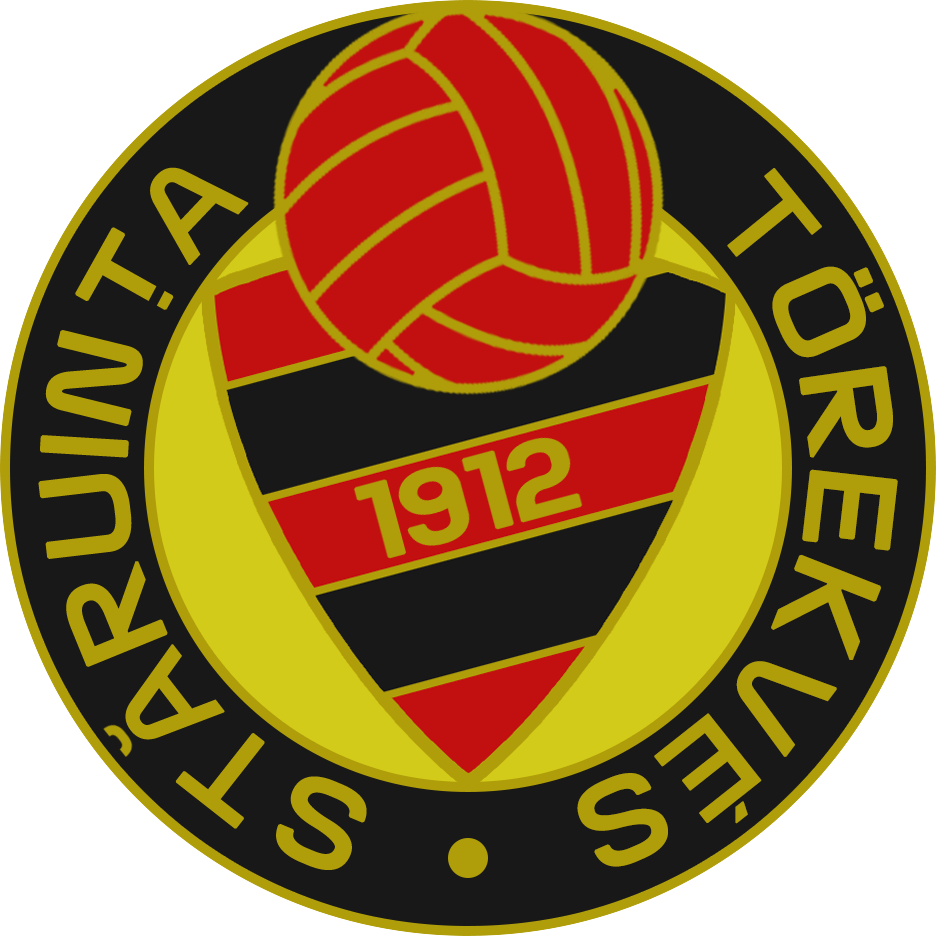
- Full name: Asociația de Cultură Fizică a Muncitorilor Stăruința Oradea
- Short name: Stăruința
- Founded: 1912
- Dissolved: 1950 absorbed by Înfrățirea Oradea
Home colours	Away colours

Stăruinţa Oradea (Hungarian: Nagyváradi Törekvés; English: Perseverance) was a Romanian football club from Oradea. They reached the final round of the Romanian football championship five times in the 1920s.

Stăruinţa Oradea was founded in Austria-Hungary in 1912, and originally competed in the Hungarian national championship. The team reached in 1922 for the first time as the winner of the Oradea Region finals to the Romanian football championship. There, the club was eliminated by eventual runners-up Victoria Cluj in a replay part of quarterfinals.

Their main rival was CA Oradea, a team with more performances than Stăruinţa Oradea. Stăruinţa reached the final again in 1926. There, the club initially played against Olimpia Satu Mare, but then played to the dominant Romanian club of that time Chinezul Timişoara who beat them. Between 1928 and 1930, Stăruinţa dominated the regional championship and always reached the finals.

== Achievements ==
Romanian Football Championship

- Quarterfinals (3): 1921–22, 1925–26, 1928–29

Oradea Region

- Champions (5): 1921–22, 1925–26, 1927–28, 1928–29, 1929–30
- Runner-up (3): 1923–24, 1924–25, 1926–27

Hungarian Third League

- Champions (1): 1943–44

== Literature ==
- Hardy Grüne (2000), Enzyklopädie der europäischen Fußballvereine (in German) (1. ed.), Kassel: AGON Sportverlag, p. 337, ISBN 3-89784-163-0
