= 1943–44 Nemzeti Bajnokság I =

Nemzeti Bajnokság I
- Season: 1943–44
- Champions: Nagyváradi AC
- Relegated: Nemzeti Nehézipari Munkások Kinizsi SC; Szegedi Tisza Vasutas SE; Budapesti Elektromos TE; BSzKRT SE

Statistics of Nemzeti Bajnokság I in the 1943/1944 season.

== Overview ==
It was contested by 16 teams, and Nagyváradi AC won the championship.

== League standings ==
Pos	Team	Pld	W	D	L	GF	GA	GR	Pts
1	Nagyváradi AC (C)	30	24	1	5	78	36	2.167	49
2	Ferencvárosi TC	30	16	4	10	71	46	1.543	36
3	Kolozsvár AC	30	15	6	9	54	45	1.200	36
4	Gamma FC	30	14	7	9	53	40	1.325	35
5	Újpest FC	30	13	7	10	92	59	1.559	33
6	Újvidéki AC	30	12	7	11	68	58	1.172	31
7	Salgótarjáni BTC	30	13	4	13	71	60	1.183	30
8	Szolnoki MÁV FC	30	13	4	13	59	58	1.017	30
9	Csepel FC	30	12	5	13	63	66	0.955	29
10	Kispest FC	30	11	6	13	66	64	1.031	28
11	Diógyőri MÁVAG	30	11	6	13	49	59	0.831	28
12	Debreceni VSC	30	10	8	12	48	70	0.686	28
13	Nemzeti Nehézipari Munkások Kinizsi SC	30	8	11	11	54	61	0.885	27
14	Szegedi Tisza Vasutas SE	30	9	6	15	53	68	0.779	24
15	Budapesti Elektromos TE	30	9	2	19	60	97	0.619	20
16	BSZKRT	30	4	8	18	50	102	0.490	16

Source: magyarfutball.hu and rsssf.com
Rules for classification: Rules for classification: 1) Points 2) Goal difference; 3) Goals scored.
(C) Champions

== Results ==
Home \ Away	BSZ	CSE	DEB	DIM	ELE	FTC	GAM	KIS	KOL	NAG	SAL	SZE	SZO	ÚJP	ÚJV	VAS
BSZKRT		2–2	0–4	2–2	1–2	3–3	2–0	1–3	0–3	2–9	1–2	3–7	0–7	2–8	2–6	2–2
Csepel	4–3		2–3	2–1	1–5	2–1	2–4	1–2	2–3	1–3	4–0	2–0	3–4	0–9	0–1	0–2
Debrecen	1–1	1–4		0–0	2–1	1–0	3–2	4–2	3–1	1–2	0–5	0–0	0–3	0–0	2–5	3–3
DiMÁVAG	2–2	1–1	2–6		1–2	1–2	1–0	0–1	2–1	4–3	2–2	1–5	0–1	4–2	0–2	3–2
Elektromos	5–2	1–5	5–1	2–5		2–3	0–4	1–5	0–4	1–2	2–7	4–0	1–2	0–3	3–15	0–1
Ferencváros	4–1	3–4	4–0	1–0	5–0		2–3	3–4	1–2	1–5	5–2	0–1	0–1	1–2	0–0	5–2
Gamma	1–4	1–1	0–1	1–0	1–1	0–1		3–1	2–1	1–2	4–2	1–1	1–0	2–2	5–0	2–2
Kispest	6–3	1–1	5–1	2–3	3–0	2–2	1–2		1–3	2–3	1–2	3–1	1–1	2–1	3–4	2–5
Kolozsvár	3–3	1–1	1–1	3–1	2–1	0–3	1–2	2–2		2–1	0–3	5–1	1–0	4–2	1–2	1–1
Nagyvárad	2–0	3–1	2–0	1–2	4–3	0–1	2–1	3–0	4–1		2–1	2–1	5–2	1–2	1–0	2–1
Salgótarjáni BTC	1–0	1–2	2–2	1–2	2–2	2–3	2–3	4–3	1–2	0–1		1–2	5–2	4–5	1–2	1–1
Szegedi VSE	2–3	1–2	1–5	1–2	3–2	1–3	0–0	1–1	0–1	1–4	2–5		3–0	2–5	4–2	5–3
Szolnok	6–0	2–3	0–0	1–3	3–6	0–6	2–1	2–1	1–2	1–3	2–4	4–1		1–1	1–1	0–1
Újpest	1–3	3–2	10–1	5–0	9–0	1–2	2–2	2–4	1–1	1–2	0–2	2–4	2–5		2–2	1–1
Újvidéki AC	3–1	1–8	4–0	2–2	0–5	1–1	0–2	3–0	0–1	1–3	2–3	1–1	2–3	2–3		0–0
Vasas	1–1	3–0	3–2	3–2	1–3	3–5	1–2	2–0	3–1	1–1	1–3	1–1	1–2	3–5	0–4	

Source: rsssf.com
Legend: Blue = home team win; Yellow = draw; Red = away team win.

== See also ==
- 1943–44 Nemzeti Bajnokság II
- 1943–44 Nemzeti Bajnokság III
