= Dumitru Pavlovici =

Romanian footballer

Personal information
- Date of birth: 26 April 1912
- Place of birth: Timișoara, Romania
- Date of death: 28 September 1993 (aged 81)
- Position: Goalkeeper

Senior career*
Years	Team	Apps	(Gls)
1931–1933	Dacia Timișoara		
1933–1941	Ripensia Timișoara	124	(0)
1941–1946	CFR Turnu Severin (Note: The Divizia A 1940–41 was the last season before World War II and the Divizia A 1946–47 was the first one after, so the appearances and goals scored during this period for CFR Turnu Severin are not official.)	0	(0)
1946–1951	CFR Timișoara	52	(0)
Total		176	(0)

International career
1936–1942	Romania	18	(0)
- * Club domestic league appearances and goals

Dumitru Pavlovici (26 April 1912 – 28 September 1993) was a Romanian football goalkeeper who played for Romania in the 1938 FIFA World Cup.

== Club career ==
Pavlovici, nicknamed Pantera neagră (English: The Black Panther), was born on 26 April 1912 in Timișoara, Romania, growing up and starting to play football as a child in the Mehala neighborhood. He started playing organized football as a forward at local club Dacia. He first played as a goalkeeper while he was still at Dacia in a game against AMEF.

In 1933, Pavlovici joined Ripensia Timișoara, where he had to compete to be first-choice goalkeeper with Vilmos Zombori, who was six years older than him. In his first season spent at the club, he won the Cupa României, but did not play in the final as Zombori was preferred. In the 1934–35 season he won the title, coaches Josef Uridil and Rudolf Wetzer using him in 15 matches. Next season, Pavlovici helped Ripensia win The Double, being given 14 appearances by coaches Wetzer and Jenő Konrád, and he played in the 5–1 win over Unirea Tricolor București in the Cupa României final. In the 1937–38 season, Pavlovici played 19 games under the guidance of coach Sepp Pojar, helping Ripensia win another title. Afterwards he kept a clean sheet in Ripensia's 3–0 win over AC Milan in the first leg of the first round of the 1938 Mitropa Cup, helping the team get past the Italians.

In 1941, Pavlovici signed with CFR Turnu Severin, winning the 1942–43 Cupa României, keeping a clean sheet in the 4–0 win over Sportul Studențesc București in the final, which helped the club win its first trophy. Subsequently, in 1946, Pavlovici went to CFR Timișoara for the last five years of his career. The highlights of this period were a runner-up position in the 1947–48 season and reaching the 1948 Cupa României final which was lost with 3–2 to ITA Arad where he did not play, because Aurel Boroș was preferred.

== International career ==
Pavlovici played 18 games for Romania, making his debut on 17 May 1936 under coach Constantin Rădulescu in a 5–2 win over Greece in the 1936 Balkan Cup. In the same competition, he also appeared in the 4–1 victory against Bulgaria as the team won the cup. He was selected by coaches Săvulescu and Rădulescu to be part of the squad that participated in the 1938 World Cup. He played in the first game against Cuba which ended in a 3–3 draw, but his teammate Robert Sadowski played in the replay that ended with a surprising 2–1 loss. Pavlovici captained the national team in his last two appearances in 1942 which were friendlies, a 1–0 loss to Slovakia and a 2–2 draw against Croatia.

== Death ==
Pavlovici died on 28 September 1993 at age 81.

== Honours ==
Ripensia Timișoara

- Divizia A: 1934–35, 1935–36, 1937–38
- Cupa României: 1933–34, 1935–36

CFR Turnu Severin

- Cupa României: 1942–43

Romania

- Balkan Cup: 1936
