= FC Farul Constanța league record by opponent =

Fotbal Club Farul Constanța is a professional association football club based in Constanța, Romania. The club was founded in 1949.

Farul Constanța played their first top league fixture on 6 March 1955 against Dinamo București. Since that game they have played in 1299 first league matches and have faced 58 different sides. Their most regular opponents have been Dinamo București, whom they have played against on 84 occasions. The club has won 27 of the league matches against Universitatea Cluj which represents the most Farul have won against any team. They have drawn more matches with Dinamo București than with any other club, with 18 of their meetings finishing without a winner. Dinamo București are also the side that has defeated Farul in more league games than any other club, having won 51 of their encounters.

== Key ==
- The table includes results of matches played by Farul Constanța in Liga I.
- ‡ Clubs with this background and symbol in the "Club" column are defunct
- The name used for each opponent is the name they had when Farul Constanța most recently played a league match against them. Results against each opponent include results against that club under any former name. For example, results against Universitatea Cluj include matches played against Știința Cluj.
- P = matches played; W = matches won; D = matches drawn; L = matches lost; F = goals for; A = goals against; Win% = percentage of total matches won
- The columns headed "First" and "Last" contain the first and most recent seasons in which Farul Constanța played league matches against each opponent

== All-time league record ==
Statistics correct as of matches played on season 2016–17.

Opponent	P	W	D	L	F	A	P	W	D	L	F	A	P	W	D	L	F	A	Win%	First	Last	Notes	
Opponent	Home						Away						Total						Win%	First	Last	Notes	
ASA Târgu Mureș ‡	14	11	2	1	24	5		14	1	3	10	9	28		28	12	5	11	33	52	42.86	1967–68	1991–92
Apulum Alba Iulia	2	2	0	0	7	0		2	1	1	0	3	2		4	3	1	0	10	9	75.00	2003–04	2004–05
Argeș Pitești	34	24	6	4	60	21		34	2	4	28	23	79		68	26	10	32	83	139	38.24	1963–64	2008–09
Astra Ploiești	4	2	1	1	6	7		4	0	0	4	3	10		8	2	1	5	9	16	25.00	1998–99	2002–03
Avântul Reghin	1	1	0	0	4	0		1	0	1	0	1	1		2	1	1	0	5	5	50.00	1955	1955
Avîntul Târgu Mureş ‡	1	0	1	0	1	1		1	0	0	1	0	3		2	0	1	1	1	4	0.00	1955	1955
CFR Cluj	12	7	0	5	18	11		12	1	5	6	8	20		24	8	5	11	26	38	33.33	1969–70	2008–09
CFR Timișoara	2	1	1	0	3	2		2	0	1	1	0	3		4	1	2	1	3	6	25.00	1955	1970–71
CS Otopeni ‡	1	1	0	0	1	0		1	0	0	1	0	6		2	1	0	1	1	7	50.00	2008–09	2008–09
CSM Reșița	10	7	3	0	21	3		10	3	2	5	11	14		20	10	5	5	32	35	50.00	1972–73	1998–99
Ceahlăul Piatra Neamț	12	9	1	2	22	8		12	1	3	8	6	15		24	10	4	10	28	37	41.67	1993–94	2007–08
Chimia Râmnicu Vâlcea ‡	3	1	2	0	5	1		3	1	0	2	1	4		6	2	2	2	6	9	33.33	1974–75	1982–83
Chindia Târgoviște ‡	5	5	0	0	11	2		5	0	1	4	2	7		10	5	1	4	13	18	50.00	1977–78	1997–98
Corvinul Hunedoara ‡	9	7	1	1	22	5		9	2	1	6	4	14		18	9	2	7	26	36	50.00	1960–61	1991–92
Crișana Oradea	1	1	0	0	1	0		1	1	0	0	1	0		2	2	0	0	2	1	100.00	1962–63	1962–63
Dacia Mioveni	1	0	1	0	1	1		1	1	0	0	3	2		2	1	1	0	4	3	50.00	2007–08	2007–08
Dacia Unirea Brăila	4	4	0	0	11	3		4	0	0	4	2	10		8	4	0	4	13	21	50.00	1990–91	1993–94
Dinamo București	42	12	9	21	40	64		42	3	9	30	41	120		84	15	18	51	81	160	17.86	1955	2008–09
Dinamo Orașul Stalin ‡	1	0	0	1	1	2		1	0	0	1	1	2		2	0	0	2	2	3	0.00	1955	1955
Extensiv Craiova ‡	5	3	1	1	6	3		5	3	0	2	6	7		10	6	1	3	12	13	60.00	1991–92	1999–00
FC Brașov	32	17	11	4	54	24		32	5	3	24	24	65		64	22	14	28	78	119	34.38	1958–59	2008–09
FC Oneşti ‡	2	2	0	0	5	1		2	0	1	1	3	4		4	2	1	1	8	9	50.00	1998–99	1999–00
FC Oradea ‡	14	8	1	5	26	16		14	2	4	8	12	24		28	10	5	13	38	50	35.71	1963–64	2003–04
FC U Craiova	15	9	3	3	26	18		15	3	1	11	12	32		30	12	4	14	38	58	40.00	1992–93	2008–09
FC Vaslui	4	3	1	0	6	3		4	2	1	1	8	6		8	5	2	1	14	12	62.50	2005–06	2008–09
FCM Bacău ‡	31	23	4	4	58	18		31	2	7	22	27	66		62	25	11	26	85	124	40.32	1958–59	2005–06
FCM Galați ‡	2	2	0	0	6	1		2	1	1	0	4	2		4	3	1	0	10	8	75.00	1974–75	1976–77
FCSB	6	2	1	3	6	11		6	0	2	4	4	15		12	2	3	7	10	21	16.67	2003–04	2008–09
Flacăra Moreni	2	2	0	0	7	3		2	0	0	2	1	5		4	2	0	2	8	12	50.00	1988–89	1989–90
Foresta Suceava ‡	2	2	0	0	4	2		2	1	0	1	2	2		4	3	0	1	6	6	75.00	1997–98	1998–99
Gaz Metan Mediaș	1	1	0	0	2	0		1	1	0	0	1	0		2	2	0	0	3	2	100.00	2008–09	2008–09
Gloria Bistrița	18	13	5	0	29	11		18	4	1	13	21	34		36	17	6	13	50	63	47.22	1990–91	2008–09
Gloria Buzău	2	1	1	0	2	0		2	1	0	1	1	1		4	2	1	1	3	3	50.00	2007–08	2008–09
Inter Sibiu ‡	8	7	0	1	17	4		8	0	2	6	5	13		16	7	2	7	22	30	43.75	1988–89	1995–96
Jiul Petroșani	23	17	4	2	39	11		23	2	5	16	14	45		46	19	9	18	53	84	41.30	1955	2006–07
Maramureş Baia Mare	2	0	2	0	2	2		2	0	1	1	1	3		4	0	3	1	3	5	0.00	1964–65	1994–95
Minerul Lupeni ‡	3	2	1	0	7	2	3	0	0	3	1	8	6	2	1	3	8	15	33.33	1959–60	1962–63		
Naţional București	27	15	4	8	42	27	27	5	6	16	22	50	54	20	10	24	64	92	37.04	1955	2006–07		
Olimpia Satu Mare	4	2	2	0	5	1	4	2	0	2	8	5	8	4	2	2	13	10	50.00	1974–75	1998–99		
Olt Scornicești	4	3	1	0	6	0	4	0	1	3	1	7	8	3	2	3	7	13	37.50	1981–82	1989–90		
Oțelul Galați	18	8	4	6	24	18	18	2	3	13	8	26	36	10	7	19	32	50	27.78	1988–89	2008–09		
Pandurii Târgu Jiu	4	2	1	1	5	3	4	2	1	1	3	2	8	4	2	2	8	7	50.00	2005–06	2008–09		
Petrolul Ploiești	31	18	9	4	41	25	31	2	4	25	9	56	62	20	13	29	50	97	32.26	1955	2003–04		
Politehnica Iași ‡	22	17	3	2	47	16	22	2	4	16	22	45	44	19	7	18	69	92	43.18	1960–61	2008–09		
Politehnica Timișoara	28	15	10	3	54	31	28	1	7	20	24	64	56	16	17	23	78	118	28.57	1955	2008–09		
Rapid București ‡	36	17	9	10	50	37	36	4	8	24	31	82	72	21	17	34	81	132	29.17	1958–59	2008–09		
Rocar București ‡	1	0	0	1	0	1	1	0	0	1	0	2	2	0	0	2	0	2	0.00	1999–00	1999–00		
Siderurgistul Galați ‡	2	2	0	0	5	1	2	0	1	1	1	2	4	2	1	1	6	7	50.00	1963–64	1965–66		
Sportul Studenţesc București	22	14	6	2	35	16	22	2	7	13	22	34	44	16	13	15	57	69	36.36	1972–73	2005–06		
Steaua București	36	16	6	14	42	47	36	2	8	26	33	86	72	18	14	40	75	128	25.00	1955	2002–03		
UM Timișoara ‡	1	1	0	0	3	0	1	1	0	0	2	0	2	2	0	0	5	3	100.00	2001–02	2001–02		
UTA Arad	26	13	11	2	37	17	26	5	5	16	19	48	52	18	16	18	56	85	34.62	1955	2007–08		
Unirea Urziceni ‡	3	0	0	3	0	3	3	1	1	1	1	1	6	1	1	4	1	1	16.67	2006–07	2008–09		
Universitatea Cluj	30	23	5	2	60	21	30	4	4	22	26	61	60	27	9	24	86	121	45.00	1955	2007–08		
Universitatea Craiova	20	15	2	3	36	11	20	1	3	16	13	44	40	16	5	19	49	80	40.00	1964–65	1991–92		
Vagonul Arad ‡	1	1	0	0	1	0	1	0	0	1	2	3	2	1	0	1	3	4	50.00	1968–69	1968–69		
Victoria București ‡	2	2	0	0	7	3	2	0	1	1	2	3	4	2	1	1	9	10	50.00	1988–89	1989–90		
Viitorul București ‡	0	0	0	0	0	0	1	0	0	1	1	3	1	0	0	1	1	3	0.00	1962–63	1961–62		
