= Alexandru Ene =

Romanian footballer

Alexandru Ene I
Personal information
- Full name: Alexandru Ene
- Date of birth: 19 September 1928
- Place of birth: Brăila, Romania
- Date of death: 22 May 2011 (aged 82)
- Place of death: București, Romania
- Position: Striker

Youth career
- 1941–1947: Olympia București

Senior career*
Years	Team	Apps	(Gls)
1947–1951	Metalul București (Note: The statistics for the 1947–48, 1950 and 1951 Divizia B seasons are unavailable.)	19	(7)
1951–1960	Dinamo București (Note: The 1957 championship called Cupa Primăverii is unofficial, so the appearances and goals scored at that competition for Dinamo București are not official.)	151	(92)
1953	→ Dinamo Brașov (loan)	9	(6)
Total		179	(105)

International career
1953–1959	Romania (Note: Including one appearance for Romania's Olympic team.)	11	(5)
- * Club domestic league appearances and goals

Alexandru Ene (also known as Alexandru Ene I; 19 September 1928 – 22 May 2011) was a Romanian football striker.

== Club career ==
Ene was born on 19 September 1928 in Brăila, Romania and began playing junior-level football at Olympia București from 1941 to 1947. Then he went to play for Metalul București at senior level in Divizia B, helping the team get promoted to Divizia A. He made his debut in the competition under coach Augustin Botescu on 22 August 1948 in a 6–1 loss to CFR Timișoara.

He was transferred to Dinamo București in 1951 where in his first season he scored a hat-trick in a 6–2 win over rivals CCA București. On 14 October 1951, Ene became the first player to score at the Dinamo Stadium when they defeated Locomotiva Timișoara. In 1953 he was loaned to Dinamo Brașov. Afterwards he returned to The Red Dogs where in the 1954 Divizia A season he became league top-scorer with 20 goals and was played the entire match by coach Angelo Niculescu in the Cupa României final which was lost with 2–0 to Metalul Reșița. In the following season he helped the club win its first Divizia A title, being used by Niculescu in 23 matches in which he netted 14 goals, being the top-scorer of the team. Ene played in the first European match of a Romanian team in the 1956–57 European Cup in the 3–1 victory against Galatasaray in which he scored the last goal. The Red Dogs advanced to the next phase of the competition where they were eliminated by CDNA Sofia, Ene playing in all four games of the campaign. He reached another Cupa României final in 1959, this time winning it as he was used the entire match by coach Iuliu Baratky in the 4–0 win over CSM Baia Mare. On 19 June 1960, Ene played his last Divizia A match for Dinamo in a 3–1 loss to Farul Constanța, totaling 179 matches with 105 goals in the competition (including eight goals for Dinamo in the derby against Steaua). Throughout his career he was known for his spectacular scissors kick goals.

After retiring, he worked in leading positions in football, including being vice-president of Dinamo from 1971 until 1973.

== International career ==
Ene played 10 games in which he scored five goals for Romania, making his debut under coach Gheorghe Popescu on 28 June 1953 in a 3–1 home victory in which he scored one goal against Bulgaria in the 1954 World Cup qualifiers. He made another two appearances during the 1954 World Cup qualifiers and then two in which he netted two goals against Greece and Yugoslavia in the 1958 World Cup qualifiers. Ene made his last appearance for the national team on 14 September 1958 in a friendly which ended with a 3–2 away loss to East Germany in which he scored one goal.

=== International goals ===
Scores and results list Romania's goal tally first. "Score" column indicates the score after each Alexandru Ene goal.

#	Date	Venue	Opponent	Score	Result	Competition
1.	28 June 1953	Stadionul Republicii, Bucharest, Romania	Bulgaria	3–1	3–1	1954 World Cup qualifiers
2.	1 June 1957	Lenin Stadium, Moscow, Soviet Union	Soviet Union	1–0	1–1	Friendly
3.	16 June 1957	Leoforos Alexandras Stadium, Athens, Greece	Greece	1–0	2–1	1958 World Cup qualifiers
4.	29 September 1957	Stadionul 23 August, Bucharest, Romania	Yugoslavia	1–1	1–1	1958 World Cup qualifiers
5.	14 September 1958	Zentralstadion, Leipzig, East Germany	East Germany	2–2	2–3	Friendly

== Personal life ==
Ene had flat feet. His brother, Nicu Lucian, was also a footballer who played for Știința București. In 2008, Ene had one leg amputated.

== Death ==
Ene died on 22 May 2011 at age 82.

== Honours ==
=== Club ===
Metalul București

- Divizia B: 1947–48

Dinamo București

- Divizia A: 1955
- Cupa României: 1958–59, runner-up 1954

=== Individual ===
- Divizia A top scorer: 1954
