= Adalbert Androvits =

Romanian footballer

Personal information
- Date of birth: 9 January 1926
- Place of birth: Timișoara, Romania
- Date of death: 2 August 2005 (aged 79)
- Position: Right back

Youth career
- 1939–1941: CAM Timișoara

Senior career*
Years	Team	Apps	(Gls)
1941–1948	CAM Timișoara		
1948	CFR Timișoara	13	(0)
1949–1950	CCA București	26	(2)
1950–1952	CFR Timișoara	35	(8)
1952–1953	Locomotiva București (Note: The statistics for the 1952 Divizia B season are unavailable.)	13	(0)
1954–1960	CFR Timișoara (Note: The statistics for the 1958–59 and 1959–60 Divizia B seasons are unavailable.)	56	(0)
Total		143	(10)

International career
1953–1956	Romania	7	(0)

Managerial career
- 1960–1962: CFR Timișoara
- 1962–1969: UM Timișoara
- * Club domestic league appearances and goals

Adalbert Androvits (9 January 1926 – 2 August 2005) was a Romanian football right defender and manager.

== Club career ==
Androvits was born on 9 January 1926 in Timișoara, Romania. He began playing junior-level football for CAM Timișoara in 1939 and soon advanced to the club's senior side in 1941. Following World War II, from January 1945 to March 1946, he was sent to forced labor in the USSR due to his mother's German heritage. Joseph Stalin viewed the forced labor of ethnic Germans as a method for Germany to pay "war reparations". Androvits subsequently returned to CAM to resume his football career in the spring of 1946.

In 1948, Androvits joined CFR Timișoara, making his Divizia A debut on 22 August 1948 under coach Balázs Hoksary in a 6–1 away victory against Metalul București. In 1949, he went to play for CCA București. There, he won the 1948–49 Cupa României trophy, playing the entire match under coach Ferenc Rónay in the 2–1 win over CSU Cluj in the final.

Midway through the 1950 season, Androvits returned to CFR. Afterwards, in the middle of the 1952 season, he moved to Divizia B club Locomotiva București, helping them gain promotion to the first league. In 1954, Androvits went for a third spell at CFR. There, he made his last Divizia A appearance on 12 August 1956 in a 4–1 home loss to Flacăra Ploiești, totaling 143 matches with 10 goals in the competition. After CFR suffered relegation at the end of the 1956 season, Androvits stayed with the club in the second league until 1960 when he retired.

== International career ==
Androvits played seven matches for Romania, making his debut on 11 October 1953 under coach Gheorghe Popescu in a 2–1 away victory against Bulgaria in the 1954 World Cup qualifiers. His second appearance took place during those same qualifiers in a 1–0 home loss to Czechoslovakia. Androvits' last five games played for the national team were friendlies in which he was captain. His final appearance took place on 28 June 1956 in a 2–0 win over Norway.

== Managerial career ==
Androvits began his coaching career at CFR Timișoara, leading the team from 1960 until 1962. Subsequently, from 1962 to 1969, he coached UM Timișoara, a period in which he helped the team gain promotion from the Regional championship to Divizia C.

== Death ==
Androvits died on 2 August 2005 at age 79.

== Honours ==
=== Player ===
CCA București

- Cupa României: 1948–49

Locomotiva București

- Divizia B: 1952

=== Manager ===
UM Timișoara

- Regional championship: 1966–67
