= Iosif Kovács =

Romanian footballer

Personal information
- Date of birth: 13 November 1921
- Place of birth: Timișoara, Romania
- Date of death: 25 May 2003 (aged 81)
- Positions: Striker; centre-back

Senior career*
| Years | Team | Apps | (Gls) |
| 1939–1940 | Chinezul Timișoara | | |
| 1940–1942 | Ripensia Timișoara | 21 | (20) |
| 1942–1944 | FC Craiova (Note: The 1940–41 Divizia A was the last season before World War II and the 1946–47 Divizia A was the first one after, so the appearances and goals scored during this period for FC Craiova are not official.) | | |
| 1945–1947 | Carmen București (Note: The 1940–41 Divizia A was the last season before World War II and the 1946–47 Divizia A was the first one after, so the appearances and goals scored during this period for Carmen București are not official with the exception of the 1945–46 regional championship.) | 23 | (24) |
| 1947–1956 | CFR Timișoara | 160 | (51) |
| Total | | 204 | (95) |

International career
| 1943–1952 | Romania | 7 | (2) |

Managerial career
- 1957–1960: CFR Timișoara
- * Club domestic league appearances and goals

Iosif Kovács (13 November 1921 – 25 February 2003) was a Romanian footballer. He competed in the men's tournament at the 1952 Summer Olympics.

== Club career ==
Kovács was born on 13 November 1921 in Timișoara, Romania and began playing junior-level football in 1933 at local club Progresul Timișoara. He started his senior career at Divizia B club Chinezul Timișoara. Subsequently, he joined neighboring club Ripensia Timișoara, making his Divizia A debut on 8 September 1940 under coach Gheorghe Ciolac in a 4–1 away victory against Gloria CFR Galați. Kovács scored 20 goals during the 1940–41 season, which made him the third-top scorer in the league, finishing one goal behind Ion Bogdan and Valeriu Niculescu.

In 1942, Kovács moved to FC Craiova, where he netted 22 goals to help them win the unofficial 1942–43 championship. In 1945, he went to play for Carmen București. He scored a career-best 24 goals in the 1946–47 season, helping Carmen finish as league runners-up and finishing as the championship's second-highest scorer, two goals fewer than ITA Arad's Ladislau Bonyhádi. In 1947, Kovács joined CFR Timișoara, where in his first season he netted 22 goals to help the team finish second in the championship. He also opened the scoring under coach Balázs Hoksary in the 1948 Cupa României final, which was lost 3–2 to ITA Arad. In the final years of his career, he transitioned from striker to centre-back. Kovács made his last Divizia A appearance on 15 November 1956, scoring once in CFR's 4–1 win over Dinamo Bacău, totaling 201 matches with 95 goals in the competition.

== International career ==
Kovács played seven matches and scored two goals for Romania, making his debut on 13 June 1943 under coach Emerich Vogl in a 2–2 friendly draw against Slovakia in which he scored once. His following two appearances were during the 1947 Balkan Cup, where he scored once in a 4–0 win over Albania. He was selected by coach Gheorghe Popescu to play in the 1952 Summer Olympics, appearing in the 2–1 loss in the first round against eventual champions Hungary. His last appearance for the national team took place on 26 October 1952 in a 3–1 friendly win against East Germany.

== Managerial career ==
Kovács was head coach of CFR Timișoara between 1957 and 1960. During the 1958–59 Divizia B season, he was close to leading the team to promotion to the first league, but they eventually finished second, two points behind Minerul Lupeni. Afterwards, from 1960 to 1969, he worked as a secretary and then as president for the club.

== Death ==
Kovács died on 25 February 2003 at age 81.

== Career statistics ==
=== International goals ===
Scores and results list Romania's goal tally first, score column indicates score after each Kovács goal.

List of international goals scored by Iosif Kovács for Romania
| Goal | Date | Venue | Opponent | Score | Result | Competition |
|---|---|---|---|---|---|---|
| 1 | 13 June 1943 | Stadionul Giulești, București, Romania | Slovakia | 2–0 | 2–2 | Friendly |
| 2 | 25 May 1947 | Qemal Stafa Stadium, Tirana, Albania | Albania | 2–0 | 4–0 | 1947 Balkan Cup |

== Honours ==
Carmen București

- Divizia A runner-up: 1940–41

CFR Timișoara

- Divizia A runner-up: 1947–48
- Cupa României runner-up: 1947–48
