= Petre Bădeanțu =

Romanian footballer

Personal information
- Date of birth: 12 March 1929
- Place of birth: Timișoara, Romania
- Date of death: 12 January 1993 (aged 63)
- Place of death: Timișoara, Romania
- Position: Striker

Youth career
- 1943–1946: CFR Timișoara

Senior career*
Years	Team	Apps	(Gls)
1946–1950	Locomotiva Timișoara	94	(67)
1951	CCA București	22	(9)
1952	CA Câmpulung Moldovenesc	21	(2)
1953	CCA București	8	(0)
1953–1956	Locomotiva Timișoara	73	(21)
Total		218	(99)

International career
1948	Romania	1	(0)
- * Club domestic league appearances and goals

Petre Bădeanțu (12 March 1929 – 12 January 1993) was a Romanian footballer who played as a striker.

== Club career ==
Bădeanțu was born on 12 March 1929 in Timișoara, Romania and began playing football as a child in the Mehala neighborhood. His talent was noticed by Iova Popovici who brought him to Locomotiva Timișoara in 1943. He made his Divizia A debut on 25 August 1946, aged 17, under coach Rudolf Kotormány in Locomotiva's 4–3 away victory over Juventus București. Bădeanțu scored 16 goals until the end of the season which helped the team finish in third place. In the following season he scored a personal record of 22 goals, making him the third top-scorer of the league, behind Ladislau Bonyhádi (49) and Bazil Marian (32), the team finishing in second place. They also reached the 1948 Cupa României final where coach Balázs Hoksary used Bădeanțu all the minutes in the eventual 3–2 loss to ITA Arad. In the 1948–49 season, he scored 14 goals, and the next year he netted 15, finishing as the league's second-highest scorer, three goals behind Andrei Rădulescu. Afterwards, Bădeanțu had to do his military service, first playing for CCA București. They won The Double in the 1951 season, as coach Gheorghe Popescu gave him 22 league appearances in which he scored nine goals, and he played the entire match in the 3–1 win over Flacăra Mediaș in the Cupa României final. Then, for the first half of the 1953 season he came back to CCA, winning another title, but he made only eight appearances without scoring. For the second half of 1953, Bădeanțu went back home in Timișoara to play again for Locomotiva, netting 10 goals in the 1954 season when they finished in fourth place. However, in 1956 the team was relegated from Divizia A, his last match in the competition taking place on 11 November 1956, a 6–0 away loss to his former side, CCA, totaling 218 league appearances with 99 goals.

== International career ==
Bădeanțu played one game for Romania when coach Colea Vâlcov used him the entire match in a 1–0 loss to Albania in the 1948 Balkan Cup.

== Death ==
Bădeanțu died on 12 January 1993, aged 63 and was buried in a cemetery in his childhood neighborhood, Mehala.

== Honours ==
Locomotiva Timișoara

- Divizia A runner-up: 1947–48
- Cupa României runner-up: 1947–48

CCA București

- Divizia A: 1951, 1953
- Cupa României: 1951
