= 1948–49 Cupa României =

Tournament details
- Country: Romania

Final positions
- Champions: CSCA București
- Runners-up: CSU Cluj

The 1948–49 Cupa României was the 12th edition of Romania's most prestigious football cup competition.

The title was won by CSCA București against CSU Cluj.

== Format ==
The competition is an annual knockout tournament.

In the first round proper, two pots are made, the first pot with Divizia A teams and other teams till 16 and the second pot with the rest of teams qualified in this phase. First-pot teams will play away. Each tie is played as a single leg.

In the first round proper, if a match is drawn after 90 minutes, the game goes in extra time, and if the score is still tied after 120 minutes, the team from the lower league will qualify.

In the rest of the rounds, if a match is drawn after 90 minutes, the game goes in extra time, and if the score is still tied after 120 minutes, the team who plays away will qualify.

In case the teams are from same city, a replay will be played.

In case the teams play in the final, a replay will be played.

From the first edition, the teams from Divizia A entered in competition in sixteen finals, rule which remained till today.

== First round proper ==
Team 1	Score	Team 2
3 September 1949
CFR Sibiu (Div. B)	6–1	(Div. A) CFR Cluj
4 September 1949
ARLUS Bacău (Div. B)	0–4	(Div. A) Petrolul București
Muntenia Moreni (Div. B)	2–1	(Div. A) Gaz Metan Mediaș
Industria Bumbacului (Div. D)	4–2	(Div. D) UCB București
Grafica MS București (Div. D)	3–5	(Div. A) Metalul București
Dermata Cluj (Div. B)	0–3 (a.e.t.)	(Div. A) RATA Târgu Mureş
CFR Galaţi (Div. B)	0–2	(Div. A) CFR București
IMS Hunedoara (Div. C)	2–0	(Div. A) Jiul Petroșani
CFR Oradea (Div. B)	0–3 (forfait)	(Div. A) CSU Timişoara
Hârtia Piatra Neamţ (Div. C)	1–7	(Div. A) CSCA București
Concordia Ploieşti (Div. B)	2–1	(Div. B) Dinamo B București
Arsenal Sibiu (Div. B)	2–1 (a.e.t.)	(Div. A) Dinamo București
CAM Timișoara (Div. B)	2–1	(Div. A) ITA Arad
Electrica Timişoara (Div. B)	1–2 (a.e.t.)	(Div. A) ICO Oradea
CFR Târgu Mureş (Div. C)	2–3	(Div. A) CSU Cluj
CFR Turnu Severin (Div. B)	2–3	(Div. A) CFR Timișoara

== Second round proper ==
Team 1	Score	Team 2
16 October 1949
Petrolul București	6–2	Industria Bumbacului
IMS Hunedoara	0–2	CFR Sibiu
Muntenia Moreni	5–2	Metalul București
RATA Târgu Mureş	0–1	CSU Cluj
19 October 1949
CFR Timișoara	4–0	CAM Timișoara
25 October 1949
CSU Timişoara	1–3	ICO Oradea
3 November 1949
Arsenal Sibiu	0–3	CSCA București
6 November 1949
Concordia Ploieşti	1–2 (a.e.t.)	CFR București

== Quarter-finals ==
Team 1	Score	Team 2
5 November 1949
CFR Sibiu	3–2	Muntenia Moreni
6 November 1949
Petrolul București	0–1	ICO Oradea
CSU Cluj	1–0	CFR Timișoara
11 December 1949
CSCA București	2–1	CFR București

== Semi-finals ==
Team 1	Score	Team 2
11 December 1949
ICO Oradea	0–1	CSU Cluj
15 December 1949
CSCA București	5–0	CFR Sibiu

== Final ==
18 December 1949
14:00 EET

CSCA București	2–1	CSU Cluj
Moldoveanu 39'; Fernbach-Ferenczi 74'	Report	Zehan 68'

ICAS, Bucharest
Attendance: 12,000
Referee: Adalbert Kincs (Lugoj)
