= Petre Steinbach =

Romanian footballer and manager

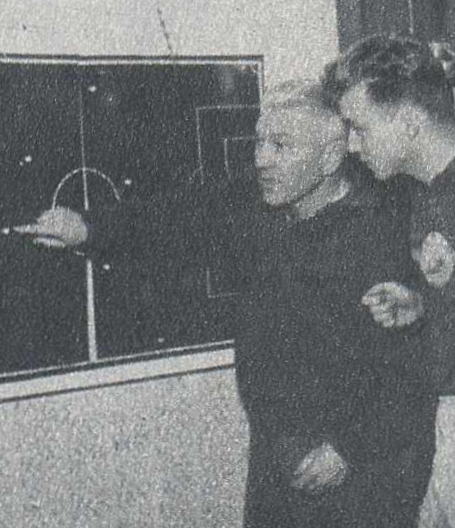
- Steinbach in 1957

Personal information
- Date of birth: January 1, 1906
- Place of birth: Temesvár, Austria-Hungary
- Date of death: 1996 (aged 89–90)
- Place of death: Germany
- Position: Midfielder

Senior career*
Years	Team	Apps	(Gls)
1925–1928	CAM Timișoara		
1928–1929	Colțea Brașov		
1929–1939	Unirea Tricolor București	90	(5)
1939–1940	Olympia București		

International career
1930–1935	Romania	18	(0)

Managerial career
- 1934–1938: Unirea Tricolor București (player-coach)
- 1940: Venus București
- 1946–1947: Carmen București
- 1947–1948: ITA Arad
- 1948: Romania
- 1948–1952: Rapid București
- 1953–1960: Tânărul Dinamovist
- 1957–1960: Romania U18
- 1963–1964: Farul Constanța
- 1967–1968: SpVgg SV Weiden
- 1968–1969: Ceahlăul Piatra Neamț
- 1969: ASA Târgu Mureș
Medal record
Representing Romania (as head coach)
UEFA European Under-18 Championship
Runner-up	1960 Austria
- * Club domestic league appearances and goals

Petre Steinbach (1 January 1906 – 1996) was a Romanian football midfielder and manager.

== Club career ==
Steinbach was born on 1 January 1906 in Temesvár, Austria-Hungary, being of Banat Swabian ethnicity, and began playing football in 1925 at CAM Timișoara. In 1928 he went for one year at Colțea Brașov, afterwards moving to Unirea Tricolor București. After playing three years in the regional league, he made his Divizia A debut on 4 September 1932 in Unirea Tricolor's 4–1 home win over AMEF Arad. During his ten-season spell at Unirea, the team earned a second place in the 1933–34 season. Subsequently, Steinbach led the club to the 1936 Cupa României final as a player-coach, playing the entire match in the 5–1 loss to Ripensia Timișoara. He made his last Divizia A appearance on 10 April 1938 in a 6–1 loss to Chinezul Timișoara, totaling 90 games with five goals in the competition. Unirea Tricolor was relegated at the end of that season, but he stayed with the club for one more year, helping it earn promotion back to the first league. Steinbach finished his playing career in 1940 at Olympia București.

== International career ==
Steinbach was selected by coach Constantin Rădulescu to be part of Romania's squad for the 1930 World Cup in which he did not play. His debut came on 12 October 1930, when Rădulescu used him in a 5–3 away loss to Bulgaria in the 1929–31 Balkan Cup. In the same tournament he also played in the rematch, a 5–2 victory, and appeared in two 4–2 away wins over Yugoslavia and Greece respectively, helping Romania win the competition. He played the entire match in Romania's first meeting against France, a home friendly that ended with a 6–3 victory. Steinbach played three games in the 1932 Balkan Cup, captaining the team for the first time in a 3–0 away win over Greece. He also played three games during the 1931–1934 Central European Cup for Amateurs and two in the 1933 Balkan Cup, including a 7–0 victory against Bulgaria, with both tournaments being won by Romania. During his 18th and last cap for the national team, he was captain in a 7–1 friendly loss to Sweden.

== Managerial career ==
In 1933 and 1938, Steinbach spent a month each year in England, studying football training sessions, including Arsenal's. He began coaching in 1934 while still playing for Unirea Tricolor București, reaching the 1936 Cupa României final, which they lost 5–1 to Ripensia Timișoara.

After World War II, Steinbach, because of his German origins, was sent for a while to forced labor in the USSR. Joseph Stalin considered that German people doing forced labor was a way for the Germans to pay "war reparations". Sent to work at a lead mine in the Donbas region, Steinbach was working in inhumane conditions. However, according to the sports journalist Lucian Oprea, one of the bosses in the region found out that among the deportees there was a former footballer, who also played in the Romanian national team. Thus Steinbach was taken out of the camp and put in charge of training a local team. He managed to get the team promoted to a higher echelon and was eventually released, returning to Romania.

In 1947 he became coach at ITA Arad, helping the team win the title, using only 14 players in the process. In the same season the club won the Cupa României, but Steinbach left before the final, Gusztáv Juhász leading the team in the 3–2 win over CFR Timișoara. In 1948 he coached Romania for a short period of time, leaving after a 9–0 away loss to Hungary in the 1948 Balkan Cup. Afterwards he went to coach Rapid București with whom he finished runner-up in the 1948–49 and 1950 seasons. After The Railwaymen were relegated in 1951, he helped them gain promotion back to the first league after one year.

Steinbach worked for a few years at Dinamo București's youth center where he taught players such as Ion and Lică Nunweiller, Ion Pârcălab, Iosif Varga and Florin Halagian. His biggest junior-level performance was reaching the 1960 European Under-18 Championship final with Romania's under-18 team, losing with 2–1 to Hungary. Following the tournament in Vienna, Steinbach was arrested for "unknown reasons" when he arrived back in Romania.

In the following years he worked at Farul Constanța in the first league, then had a spell in West Germany at Weiden where he was recommended by Helmut Schön. Subsequently, he returned in the country in 1968 to coach lower league side, Ceahlăul Piatra Neamț, afterwards having his last first league spell at ASA Târgu Mureș in 1969. Steinbach has a total of 190 matches as a manager in the Romanian top-division, Divizia A, consisting of 78 victories, 36 draws and 76 losses.

== Writing ==
Steinbach wrote his first book in 1937 titled Fotbalul nostru (Our football) which received a positive review from Camil Petrescu. He wrote another volume titled Fotbalul se joacă râzând (Football is played with laughter), released in 1972. He also wrote for a few years an analysis column in the Sportul popular newspaper.

== Death ==
Steinbach died in 1996 at age 90 in Germany, a country where he had settled in 1975.

== Quotes ==
- "In most cases, a football player is formed until the age of 20. When he enters the first team, all he has to do is perfect his game and crystallize his technique."
- "The educator, the teacher must have a double goal in mind: the "gentleman-athlete", who can respond perfectly to the physical effort but who also lives the moral aspect of the sport. An athlete must lead a complete life, to be lived both with his body and his soul. And this sporting life must be continuous."
- "A player must develop, before entering the first team, in all positions. It is a big mistake to raise, from a young age, specialized players for certain positions."
- "A wretched financial spirit prevails among our players, which obscures this understanding. They only play to earn money, which they can easily squander in a non-sporting life. Professionalism was created to give players as much time as possible to improve. Our footballers imported the goal but did not admit the obstacles."

== Honours ==
=== Player ===
Unirea Tricolor București

- Divizia A runner-up: 1933–34
- Divizia B: 1938–39
- Cupa României runner-up: 1935–36

Romania

- Balkan Cup: 1929–31, 1933
- Central European International Cup: 1931–34

=== Manager ===
Unirea Tricolor București

- Cupa României runner-up: 1935–36

ITA Arad

- Divizia A: 1947–48
- Cupa României: 1947–48

Rapid București

- Divizia A runner-up: 1948–49, 1950
- Divizia B: 1952

Romania U18

- Under-18 European Championship runner-up: 1960
