= 1946–47 Romanian Hockey League season =

Romanian ice hockey season

The 1946–47 Romanian Hockey League season was the 18th season of the Romanian Hockey League. Four teams participated in the league, and HC Ciocanul Bucuresti won the championship.

== Regular season ==
Dermagand Târgu Mureș - CS Miercurea Ciuc 13-1

HC Ciocanul București - Textila Buhuși 6-0

Dermagand Târgu Mureș - Textila Buhuși 10-2

HC Ciocanul București - CS Miercurea Ciuc 7-2

CS Miercurea Ciuc - Textila Buhuși 11-5

HC Ciocanul București - Dermagand Târgu Mureș 1-1 (Sadovsky - Turcu)

HC Ciocanul: Dron, Anastasiu, Sadovsky, Flamaropol, Fl. Popescu, Dlugosch, Tanase, Pana, Amirovici

	Club
1.	HC Ciocanul București
2.	Dermagand Târgu Mureș
3.	CS Miercurea Ciuc
4.	Textila Buhuși
