= Adalbert Kovács =

Romanian footballer

Personal information
- Date of birth: 28 September 1920
- Place of birth: Timișoara, Romania
- Date of death: August 1999 (aged 78)
- Height: 1.70 m (5 ft 7 in)
- Position: Striker

Youth career
- 1933–1934: Electrica Timișoara
- 1934–1939: Chinezul Timișoara

Senior career*
Years	Team	Apps	(Gls)
1939–1940	Chinezul Timișoara		
1942–1945	Kaposvár		
1946–1953	Flamura Roșie Arad	123	(63)
1954–1956	Locomotiva Timișoara	49	(17)
Total		172	(80)

International career
1947–1948	Romania	3	(0)
- * Club domestic league appearances and goals as of 25 January 2020

Adalbert Kovács (28 September 1920 – August 1999) was a Romanian football player who played as a striker.

== Club career ==
Kovács was born on 28 September 1920 in Timișoara, Romania. He began playing junior-level football at Electrica Timișoara. Afterwards he went to Chinezul Timișoara where he also started playing at senior level. In 1942 he joined Hungarian second league side Kaposvár. Kovács returned to Romania, where on 9 March 1947, he made his Divizia A debut under coach Zoltán Blum, playing for Flamura Roșie Arad in a 5–1 victory in which he scored a hat-trick against Libertatea Oradea. He netted a total of 13 goals in 13 appearances, helping the club win the 1946–47 title. In the following season he helped the club win The Double, scoring a personal record of 19 goals in 26 league matches under coach Petre Steinbach. However, he was not the team's top-scorer as Ladislau Bonyhádi scored 49. On 7 March 1948, in a 6–1 away victory against CSCA București, he and teammate Iosif Stibinger each scored three goals, marking the first time two players from the same team netted a hat-trick. Kovács also scored his team's first goal in the 3–2 victory in the 1948 Cupa României final against CFR Timișoara, thus helping Flamura Roșie win its first Cupa României. He won another title with the club in 1950, but coach Francisc Dvorzsák used him in only three games. In 1953, he helped The Old Lady win another Cupa României, with coach Coloman Braun-Bogdan playing him the entire match in the 1–0 win over CCA București in the final. In 1954, Kovács joined Locomotiva Timișoara. There, he made his last Divizia A appearance in a 6–0 loss to CCA București, totaling 172 matches with 80 goals in the competition.

== International career ==
Kovács played three games for Romania all of which took place at the Giulești Stadium in Bucharest. He made his debut under coach Ferenc Rónay on 21 September 1947 in a 6–2 friendly loss to Czechoslovakia. In his next game he came as a substitute in the 56th minute to replace Ladislau Incze in a friendly 0–0 draw against Poland. Kovács's last appearance for the national team took place on 2 May 1948 in a 1–0 loss to Albania in the 1948 Balkan Cup.

== Death ==
He died at the end of summer 1999 at age 78.

== Honours ==
Flamura Roșie Arad

- Divizia A: 1946–47, 1947–48, 1950
- Cupa României: 1947–48, 1953
