= 1940–41 Divizia B =

Divizia B
- Season: 1940–41

The 1940–41 Divizia B was the seventh season of the second tier of the Romanian football league system.

The league included 26 teams divided in three regional series. Many changes in the composition of the series were caused by the beginning of World War II. It was the last official season of Divizia B until 1946, when the league was resumed. The seasons played during World War II are not considered official. Also, promotions and relegations were not feasible this season because Divizia A and Divizia C were also suspended for the next 5 years.

== Team changes ==
=== To Divizia B ===
Promoted from Divizia C

- Ateneul Tătărași Iași
- CFR Brașov
- CFR Timișoara
- Crișana CFR Arad
- Metalosport Călan
- Olympia București
- Politehnica Timișoara
- Rapid Timișoara
- Vitrometan Mediaș

Relegated from Divizia A

- CAM Timișoara
- Juventus București

=== From Divizia B ===
Relegated to Divizia C

- Astra-Metrom Brașov
- SS Doc Galați
- Victoria CFR Iași
- Sparta Mediaș

Promoted to Divizia A

- Ploiești
- Mica Brad
- Universitatea Cluj
- Craiova
- Brăila
- Gloria Arad

=== Excluded teams ===
AMEF Arad was excluded from Divizia A and substituted with Gloria Arad. The team also did not start the 1940–41 Divizia B season after being dissolved by the legionary regime.

CAM Timișoara was abusively excluded from the Divizia A and was forced to play in the Divizia B, because was a workers' football club.

Feroemail Ploiești was excluded, being another victim of the regime's law of banning workers' teams.

Maccabi București, sport club, representing the Jewish community was expelled from all the official competitions by the same legionary regime, which adopted antisemitic policies.

=== Other teams ===
CA Oradea, Crișana Oradea, CS Târgu Mureș, Mureșul Târgu Mureș, Olimpia CFR Satu Mare, Oltul Sfântu Gheorghe, Stăruința Oradea, Victoria Carei and Victoria Cluj moved in the Hungarian football league system due to the Second Vienna Award which was signed on 30 August 1940, territory of Northern Transylvania being assigned from Romania to Hungary.

Universitatea Cluj was promoted in the Divizia A instead of Crișana Oradea, even that the Second Vienna Award regard also Cluj-Napoca in the territory of Northern Transylvania, Universitatea refused to play in Hungary and relocated to Sibiu, being renamed as Universitatea Cluj-Sibiu.

Dragoș Vodă Cernăuți and Muncitorul Cernăuți (Northern Bukovina), Maccabi Chișinău, Nistru Chișinău and Traian Tighina (Bessarabia) were not allowed to play anymore in the Romanian football league system due to the Soviet occupation of Bessarabia and Northern Bukovina during June 28 – July 4, 1940, which had as result the Soviet annexation of the region.

== League tables ==
=== Serie I ===
Pos	Team	Pld	W	D	L	GF	GA	GD	Pts
1	CFR Turnu Severin (C)	18	12	3	3	50	30	+20	27
2	SSM Reșița	18	12	2	4	49	24	+25	26
3	Electrica Timișoara	18	10	3	5	43	20	+23	23
4	Rapid Timișoara	18	10	3	5	53	27	+26	23
5	Chinezul Timișoara	18	9	2	7	47	37	+10	20
6	CFR Timișoara	18	7	4	7	35	37	−2	18
7	Vulturii Textila Lugoj	18	7	1	10	31	55	−24	15
8	Crișana CFR Arad	18	5	1	12	32	57	−25	11
9	Politehnica Timișoara	18	4	1	13	32	54	−22	9
10	CAM Timișoara	18	2	4	12	26	57	−31	8

Source: romaniansoccer.ro
Rules for classification: Rules for classification: 1) Points 2) Head-to-head points; 3) Head-to-head goal difference; 4) Head-to-head goals scored; 5) Head-to-head away goals scored; 6) Goal difference; 7) Goals scored.
(C) Champions

=== Serie II ===
Pos	Team	Pld	W	D	L	GF	GA	GD	Pts
1	Jiul Petroșani (C)	14	10	1	3	53	22	+31	21
2	IS Câmpia Turzii	14	7	6	1	40	16	+24	20
3	CFR Brașov	14	7	3	4	33	24	+9	17
4	Metalosport Călan	14	7	2	5	23	31	−8	16
5	CFR Simeria	14	7	2	5	31	28	+3	16
6	Minerul Lupeni	14	5	3	6	27	27	0	13
7	Vitrometan Mediaș	14	2	4	8	25	45	−20	8
8	Cimentul Turda	14	0	1	13	2	41	−39	1

Source: romaniansoccer.ro
Rules for classification: Rules for classification: 1) Points 2) Head-to-head points; 3) Head-to-head goal difference; 4) Head-to-head goals scored; 5) Head-to-head away goals scored; 6) Goal difference; 7) Goals scored.
(C) Champions

=== Serie III ===
Pos	Team	Pld	W	D	L	GF	GA	GD	Pts
1	Juventus București (C)	14	12	1	1	86	17	+69	25
2	Franco-Româna Brăila	14	8	2	4	36	21	+15	18
3	Constanța	14	6	4	4	29	44	−15	16
4	Turda București	14	6	2	6	34	36	−2	14
5	Olympia București	14	5	3	6	34	37	−3	13
6	Dacia VA Galați	14	3	4	7	21	42	−21	10
7	Prahova Ploiești	14	3	3	8	23	41	−18	9
8	Ateneul Tătărași Iași	14	3	1	10	24	49	−25	7

Source: romaniansoccer.ro
Rules for classification: Rules for classification: 1) Points 2) Head-to-head points; 3) Head-to-head goal difference; 4) Head-to-head goals scored; 5) Head-to-head away goals scored; 6) Goal difference; 7) Goals scored.
(C) Champions

== See also ==
- 1940–41 Divizia A
