= Florea Birtașu =

Romanian footballer (1930–2018)

Personal information
- Date of birth: 1 February 1930
- Place of birth: Bucharest, Romania
- Date of death: 9 February 2018 (aged 88)
- Position: Goalkeeper

Youth career
- 1950: Flacăra Roșie București

Senior career*
Years	Team	Apps	(Gls)
1951	Flacăra București	12	(0)
1952–1953	CA Câmpulung Moldovenesc	11	(0)
1954–1956	Dinamo București	46	(0)
1957–1960	Progresul București (Note: The 1957 championship called Cupa Primăverii is unofficial, so the appearances and goals scored at that competition for Progresul București are not official.)	27	(0)
1960–1965	CFR Roșiori		
Total		96	(0)

International career
1953–1955	Romania	3	(0)
- * Club domestic league appearances and goals

Florea Birtașu (1 February 1930 – 9 February 2018) was a Romanian football goalkeeper. (Note: Florea Birtașu at WorldFootball.net)

== Club career ==
Birtașu was born on 1 February 1930 in Bucharest, Romania and began playing football in 1950 at local club Flacăra Roșie. In 1951, he joined Flacăra București where under the guidance of coach Gheorghe Bărbulescu he made his Divizia A debut on 16 June 1951 in a 0–0 draw against CCA București. Afterwards he went to play at CA Câmpulung Moldovenesc for two years. In 1954 he signed with Dinamo București, where his first performance was reaching the 1954 Cupa României final, but coach Angelo Niculescu did not use him in the eventual 2–0 loss to Metalul Reșița. In the following season, Birtașu helped the club win the first Divizia A title in its history, being used by Niculescu in 18 games. He played in the first European match for a Romanian team during the 1956–57 European Cup, a 3–1 victory against Galatasaray. The Red Dogs advanced to the next phase of the competition where they were eliminated by CDNA Sofia, Birtașu making two appearances in the campaign. In 1957 he went to play for Progresul București, winning with them the 1959–60 Cupa României, but coach Augustin Botescu did not use him in the 2–0 win in the final against Dinamo Obor București. (Note: Florea Birtașu at National-Football-Teams.com) In 1960, after totaling 96 Divizia A appearances, Birtașu went to play for CFR Roșiori in Divizia B for a few years.

== International career ==
Birtașu played three games for Romania, making his debut under coach Ștefan Dobay in a 1–0 loss to Czechoslovakia in the 1954 World Cup qualifiers. His following two games were friendlies, a 1–0 victory against Norway and a 4–1 loss to Sweden.

== Death ==
Birtașu died on 9 February 2018 at age 88.

== Honours ==
Dinamo București

- Divizia A: 1955
- Cupa României runner-up: 1954

Progresul București

- Cupa României: 1959–60
