= Aurel Boroș =

Romanian footballer (1922–?)

Personal information
- Date of birth: 11 November 1922
- Position: Goalkeeper

Senior career*
Years	Team	Apps	(Gls)
1940–1943	Universitatea Cluj (Note: The Divizia A 1940–41 was the last season before World War II and the Divizia A 1946–47 was the first one after, so the appearances and goals scored during this period for Universitatea Cluj are not official.)	20	(0)
1947–1954	Locomotiva Timișoara	80	(0)
1958–1961	CFR Timișoara		
Total		100	(0)

International career
1945–1949	Romania	2	(0)
- * Club domestic league appearances and goals

Aurel Boroș (born 11 November 1922, date of death unknown) was a Romanian football goalkeeper. He reached two Cupa României finals with Universitatea Cluj and Locomotiva Timișoara, but both of them were lost. Boroș is deceased.

== International career ==
Aurel Boroș played two friendly matches for Romania's national team.

== Honours ==
Universitatea Cluj

- Cupa României runner-up: 1941–42

Locomotiva Timișoara

- Cupa României runner-up: 1947–48
