= 1954 Divizia A =

37th season of top-tier football league in Romania

Divizia A
- Season: 1954
- Champions: Flamura Roşie Arad
- Top goalscorer: Alexandru Ene (20)

The 1954 Divizia A was the thirty-seventh season of Divizia A, the top-level football league of Romania.

== Teams ==
Location of teams in 1954 Divizia A

== League table ==
Pos	Team	Pld	W	D	L	GF	GA	GD	Pts	Qualification or relegation
1	Flamura Roșie Arad (C)	26	15	5	6	37	29	+8	35	Champions of Romania
2	CCA București	26	13	8	5	35	25	+10	34	
3	Dinamo București	26	12	9	5	62	36	+26	33	
4	Locomotiva Timișoara	26	10	9	7	40	22	+18	29	
5	Știința Cluj	26	11	6	9	32	32	0	28	
6	Știința Timișoara	26	5	17	4	34	27	+7	27	
7	Flacăra Ploiești	26	8	8	10	33	31	+2	24	
8	Dinamo Orașul Stalin	26	9	6	11	28	28	0	24	
9	Minerul Petroșani	26	6	12	8	28	35	−7	24	
10	Locomotiva Târgu Mureş	26	8	7	11	30	38	−8	23	
11	Metalul Hunedoara (R)	26	9	5	12	35	51	−16	23	Relegation to Divizia B
12	Locomotiva București (R)	26	9	4	13	38	45	−7	22	Relegation to Divizia B
13	Metalul Câmpia Turzii (R)	26	4	12	10	23	36	−13	20	Relegation to Divizia B
14	Progresul Oradea (R)	26	4	10	12	22	42	−20	18	Relegation to Divizia B

Source: LT
Rules for classification: 1) points; 2) goal average; 3) number of goals scored
(C) Champions; (R) Relegated

=== Results ===
Home \ Away	CCA	DIN	DOS	FLA	FRA	LBU	LTI	TÂR	HUN	TUR	MIP	ORA	ȘCJ	ȘTI
CCA București	—	2–2	2–1	2–1	2–1	3–0	2–1	1–1	1–0	2–2	2–2	1–0	0–1	1–0
Dinamo București	0–0	—	3–2	3–3	5–0	2–2	1–1	4–2	6–1	1–1	2–2	4–0	3–4	1–3
Dinamo Orașul Stalin	1–2	1–2	—	1–0	2–0	1–0	1–0	0–3	0–1	2–0	3–0	0–0	2–1	1–1
Flacăra Ploiești	0–1	1–4	1–0	—	1–3	0–2	2–1	3–0	8–0	3–1	1–0	0–1	1–1	1–1
Flamura Roșie Arad	3–0	1–0	2–0	0–0	—	4–1	1–1	1–0	2–1	1–0	2–2	2–1	1–0	1–1
Locomotiva București	2–3	1–2	1–3	3–0	2–3	—	0–2	2–0	3–1	1–0	2–1	0–0	2–1	5–4
Locomotiva Timișoara	2–0	1–1	2–0	0–0	0–2	5–0	—	3–0	5–0	2–0	3–0	5–0	3–1	1–1
Locomotiva Târgu Mureş	0–2	1–0	1–1	1–3	2–3	1–0	3–0	—	2–1	1–1	1–0	5–1	1–0	2–2
Metalul Hunedoara	2–1	2–5	2–2	3–1	1–2	2–1	2–0	2–1	—	3–0	0–0	2–2	1–1	0–0
Metalul Câmpia Turzii	1–4	0–4	1–0	0–0	0–2	1–1	3–0	1–1	3–0	—	1–1	1–1	2–0	3–3
Minerul Petroșani	0–0	2–1	1–1	0–0	0–0	0–3	0–0	0–0	0–5	3–1	—	2–1	4–0	1–1
Progresul Oradea	1–1	2–4	1–1	0–1	1–0	3–2	2–2	1–1	0–1	0–0	0–1	—	1–0	1–1
Știința Cluj	1–0	1–2	1–0	2–1	2–0	3–2	0–0	2–0	2–1	0–0	4–3	3–1	—	1–1
Știința Timișoara	0–0	0–0	0–2	1–1	4–0	0–0	0–0	4–0	3–1	0–0	1–3	2–1	0–0	—

Source: LT (in Romanian)
Legend: Blue = home team win; Yellow = draw; Red = away team win.

== Top goalscorers ==
Rank	Player	Club	Goals
1	Alexandru Ene	Dinamo București	20
2	Adalbert Kovács	Locomotiva Timișoara	15
3	Gheorghe Váczi	Flamura Roșie Arad	13
4	Ion Ciosescu	Știința Timișoara	12
4	Iacob Olaru	Locomotiva București	12

== Champion squad ==
Flamura Roșie Arad

Goalkeepers: Francisc Kiss (19 / 0); Iosif Fuleiter (7 / 0).
Defenders: Gavril Szücs (21 / 0); Radin Dușan (23 / 0); Zoltan Farmati (23 / 0); Gheorghe Lupeș (9 / 0); Ladislau Sereș (4 / 0).
Midfielders: Iosif Kapas (26 / 0); Gavril Serfözö (21 / 4).
Forwards: Toma Jurcă (13 / 1); Ilie Don (21 / 3); Gheorghe Váczi (26 / 13); Andrei Mercea (24 / 1); Nicolae Dumitrescu (23 / 4); Iosif Szakács (7 / 0); Nicolae Popa (14 / 0); Ion Manole (10 / 2); Vichentie Birău (17 / 7).
(league appearances and goals listed in brackets)

Manager: Coloman Braun-Bogdan.

== See also ==
- 1954 Divizia B
- 1954 Regional Championship
- 1954 Cupa României
