= Dermata Cluj =

- Full name: Fotbal Club Dermata Cluj
- Nickname: Papucarii (The Shoes Makers)
- Short name: Dermata
- Founded: 1937
- Dissolved: 1967
- Ground: Stadionul Clujana, Cluj-Napoca
- Capacity: 2,000
Home colours

Dermata Cluj was a football club from Cluj-Napoca, Cluj County, dissolved in 1967.

== History ==
The shoes factory from Cluj-Napoca called Echo Cluj created the team and was the main sponsor of the team until 1948. Notable players from that time was Darock, Bagoly, Kallo, Kiss, Toth. Ferencz Ronay was the first big manager who create a competitive team, and played for the first time in Divizia A, the Romanian First Football League. Stadionul Clujana (Clujana Stadium) was the main stadium of the team, situated next to the shoes factory. Even though they finished 11th out of 16th places in 1947–48 Divizia A they were relegated in Divizia B because they lost the Relegation / Promotion Play Off. Also because of the nationalization of institutions in Romania and because of the Communist Regime in Romania the team lost the sponsor and never played again in the First Football League. In 1950, they appeared under the name of Flamura Roşie Herbak Cluj, after the new name of the factory "Janos Herbak". In 1960, they merged with CFR Cluj under the name of CSM Cluj (Clubul Sportiv Muncitoresc Cluj). In 1967, CFR Cluj detached from the main team, and Dermata Cluj disappeared.

Their best performance in the club history was to participate in 1947–48, but even they finished on 11th out of 16th, they lost in the Relegation / Promotion Play Off and turned back in the Second League after just one season.

== Performances ==
Liga I:

- Played (1): 1947–48

Liga II:

- Winners (1): 1946–47

Liga III:

- Winners (1): 1958–59

== Key ==
- Pos = Final position
- P = Played
- W = Games won
- D = Games drawn
- L = Games lost
- GF = Goals For
- GA = Goals Against
- Pts = Points
- Div A = Liga I
- Div B = Liga II
- Div C = Liga III
- p = Preliminary Round
- 1R = Round 1
- 2R = Round 2
- 3R = Round 3
- 4R = Round 4
- 5R = Round 5
- GS = Group stage
- R32 = Round of 32
- QF = Quarter-finals
- R16 = Round of 16
- SF = Semi-finals
- F = Final

Champions	Runners-up	Third place	Promoted	Relegated

The players in bold were the top goalscorers in the division.

== Seasons ==
Season	League									Cup	European Cup	Other	Top Goalscorer(s)		Notes	Name
Season	**Division**	**Pos**	**P**	**W**	**D**	**L**	**GF**	**GA**	**Pts**	Cup	European Cup	Other	**Name**	**Goals**	Notes	Name
**1937–38**	District									p						Echo Cluj
**1938–39**	District									p						Echo Cluj
**1939–40**	District									p						Echo Cluj
**1940–41**	District	–	–	–	–	–	–	–	–	–			–	–	Retired due to Second Vienna Award	Dermata Cluj
1940–45 Not involved in any competitions due to World War II																Dermata Cluj
**1945–46**	District	2nd								–						Dermata Cluj
**1946–47**	Div B	**1st**	26	20	5	1	77	16	**45**	–						Dermata Cluj
**1947–48**	**Div A**	11th	30	7	11	12	41	50	**25**	R16						Dermata Cluj
**1948–49**	Div B	10th	26	10	6	10	37	33	**26**	R32						Dermata Cluj
**1950**	District									p						Flamura Roşie Herbak Cluj
**1951**	District									p						Flamura Roşie Herbak Cluj
**1952**	District									p						Flamura Roşie Herbak Cluj
**1953**	District	**1st**								p						Flamura Roşie Herbak Cluj
**1954**	Div B	3rd	24	11	6	7	36	27	**28**	p						Flamura Roşie Herbak Cluj
**1955**	Div B	10th	26	8	7	11	31	36	**23**	p						Flamura Roşie Herbak Cluj
**1956**	Div C	4th	24	11	4	9	47	30	**26**	p						Flamura Roşie Herbak Cluj
**1957**	Div C	**1st**	12	8	2	2	23	8	**18**	–						Flamura Roşie Herbak Cluj
**1957–58**	Div C	4th	26	9	11	6	22	28	**29**	p						Rapid Cluj
**1958–59**	Div C	**1st**	18	12	4	2	46	17	**28**	p						Rapid Cluj
**1959–60**	Div B	7th	26	9	8	9	32	35	**26**	R32					Merged with CFR Cluj	Rapid Cluj
**1960–61**	Div B	8th	26	9	7	10	29	41	**25**	p						CSM Cluj
**1961–62**	Div B	7th	26	10	8	8	32	31	**28**	p						CSM Cluj
**1962–63**	Div B	5th	26	10	7	9	40	30	**27**	p						CSM Cluj
**1963–64**	Div B	11th	26	9	4	13	34	31	**22**	R32						CSM Cluj
**1964–65**	Div B	3rd	26	11	5	10	34	22	**27**	R32						Clujeana Cluj
**1965–66**	Div B	9th	26	7	8	11	31	43	**22**	R16						Clujeana Cluj
**1966–67**	Div B	11th	26	8	7	11	26	35	**23**	p					Discontinued	Clujeana Cluj
