= 1954 Cupa României =

Tournament details
- Country: Romania

Final positions
- Champions: Metalul Reșița
- Runners-up: Dinamo București

The 1954 Cupa României was the 17th edition of Romania's most prestigious football cup competition.

The trophy was won by Metalul Reșița for the first time in history. It was also the first time when a team from the second division of Romanian football won the trophy.

== Format ==
The competition is an annual knockout tournament.

In the first round proper, two pots were made, first pot with Divizia A teams and other teams till 16 and the second pot with the rest of teams qualified in this phase. First pot teams will play away. Each tie is played as a single leg.

If a match is drawn after 90 minutes, the game goes in extra time, and if the scored is still tight after 120 minutes, the team who plays away will qualify.

In case the teams are from same city, there a replay will be played.

In case the teams play in the final, there a replay will be played.

From the first edition, the teams from Divizia A entered in competition in sixteen finals, rule which remained till today.

== Divizia A Teams ==
The following list represent the teams who played in 1954 Divizia A, which qualified directly in sixteen finals or first round proper.

Flamura Roşie Arad
CCA București
Dinamo București
Locomotiva Timişoara
Ştiinţa Cluj
Știința Timișoara
Flacăra Ploieşti

Dinamo Oraşul Stalin
Minerul Petroşani
Locomotiva Târgu Mureş
Metalul Hunedoara
Locomotiva București
Metalul Câmpia Turzii
Progresul Oradea

== First round proper ==
Team 1	Score	Team 2
11 August 1954
Locomotiva Arad (Div. B)	0–1	(Div. A) Flamura Roșie Arad
Steagul Roșu Orașul Stalin (Div. B)	0–3	(Div. A) Locomotiva Târgu Mureș
Metalul Brăila (Div. B)	0–3	(Div. B) Locomotiva Constanța
Voința București (Div. B)	1–2	(Div. B) Metalul București
Metalul Câmpina (Div. B)	0–3	(Div. A) Dinamo București
Progresul Cluj (Div. C)	2–3	(Div. A) Metalul Câmpia Turzii
Știința Craiova (Div. C)	0–1	(Div. A) Locomotiva Timișoara
Locomotiva Iași (Div. B)	1–3 (a.e.t.)	(Div. A) CCA București
Flacăra Moinești (Div. C)	0–4	(Div. A) Locomotiva București
Metalul Oradea (Div. B)	3–0	(Div. A) Progresul Oradea
Locomotiva Pașcani (Div. B)	1–3	(Div. A) Flacăra Ploiești
Metalul Reșița (Div. B)	5–1	(Div. A) Știința Timișoara
Progresul Satu Mare (Div. B)	3–2	(Div. A) Știința Cluj
Flamura Roșie Sf. Gheorghe (Div. B)	2–1	(Div. A) Dinamo Orașul Stalin
12 August 1954
Locomotiva Craiova (Div. B)	2–1	(Div. A) Minerul Petroșani
18 August 1954
Progresul Sibiu (Div. B)	3–2	(Div. A) Metalul Hunedoara

== Second round proper ==
Team 1	Score	Team 2
20 October 1954
Metalul București	2–4 (a.e.t.)	Dinamo București
Locomotiva Constanța	0–1	CCA București
Locomotiva Craiova	2–3 (a.e.t.)	Flacăra Ploiești
Metalul Oradea	0–2	Locomotiva Timișoara
Metalul Reșița	4–0	Locomotiva Târgu Mureș
Progresul Satu Mare	1–3	Flamura Roșie Arad
Flamura Roșie Sf. Gheorghe	4–0	Metalul Câmpia Turzii
Progresul Sibiu	1–4	Locomotiva București

== Quarter-finals ==
Team 1	Score	Team 2
28 November 1954
Dinamo București	3–0	Flamura Roșie Sf. Gheorghe
CCA București	1–0	Locomotiva București
Flacăra Ploiești	3–1 (a.e.t.)	Flamura Roșie Arad
Metalul Reșița	2–0	Locomotiva Timișoara

== Semi-finals ==
Team 1	Score	Team 2
1 December 1954
Dinamo București	4–1	Flacăra Ploiești
Metalul Reșița	1–0	CCA București

== Final ==
5 December 1954
13:30 EET

Metalul Reșița	2–0	Dinamo București
Szeleș 30', 40'	Report

Republicii, Bucharest
Attendance: 30,000
Referee: Dumitru Schulder (Bucharest)

Cupa României 1954 winners

1st title
