= 1948 Cupa României final =

- Event: 1947–48 Cupa României
| ITA Arad | CFR Timișoara |
| 3 | 2 |
- Date: 15 August 1948
- Venue: Venus, Bucharest
- Referee: Emil Kroner (Bucharest)
- Attendance: 10,000

The 1948 Cupa României final was the 11th final of Romania's most prestigious football cup competition. It was disputed between ITA Arad and CFR Timișoara, and was won by Arad after a game with 5 goals. It was the first cup title in the history of ITA Arad.

This was the first Cupa României final after the Second World War, with the previous edition played exactly five years earlier on 15 August 1943.

Due to scheduling issues, the final (though corresponding to the 1947–48 autumn-winter-spring season) was not played until mid-August; this had a knock-on effect for the next season, with its final played in December 1949.

== Match details ==
15 August 1948
17:15 EET

| ITA Arad | 3–2 | CFR Timișoara |
|---|---|---|
| A.Kovács 38'; Reinhardt 56'; Băcuț 82' | Report | I.Kovács 7'; Woronkowski 8' |

Venus, Bucharest
Attendance: 10,000
Referee: Emil Kroner (Bucharest)

| GK | 1 | (Romania) Alexandru Marky |
| DF | 2 | (Romania) Moise Vass |
| DF | 3 | (Romania) Zoltan Farmati |
| MF | 4 | (Romania) Gheorghe Băcuț |
| MF | 5 | (Romania) Adalbert Pall |
| MF | 6 | (Romania) József Pecsovszky |
| FW | 7 | (Romania) Adalbert Kovács |
| FW | 8 | (Romania) Ioan Reinhardt |
| FW | 9 | (Romania) Ladislau Bonyhádi |
| FW | 10 | (Romania) Iosif Stibinger |
| FW | 11 | (Romania) Nicolae Dumitrescu |
Manager:
(Romania) Gusztáv Juhász

| GK | 1 | (Romania) Aurel Boroș |
| DF | 2 | (Romania) Ioan Barna |
| DF | 3 | (Romania) Ştefan Rodeanu |
| MF | 4 | (Romania) Petre Cojereanu |
| MF | 5 | (Romania) Iosif Ritter |
| MF | 6 | (Romania) Constantin Woronkowski |
| FW | 7 | (Romania) Gheorghe Moniac |
| FW | 8 | (Romania) Nicolae Reuter |
| FW | 9 | (Romania) Iosif Kovács |
| FW | 10 | (Romania) Emil Avasilichioaie |
| FW | 11 | (Romania) Petre Bădeanțu |
Manager:
(Romania) Balázs Hoksary

== See also ==
- List of Cupa României finals
