= Coloman Braun-Bogdan =

Romanian footballer and manager

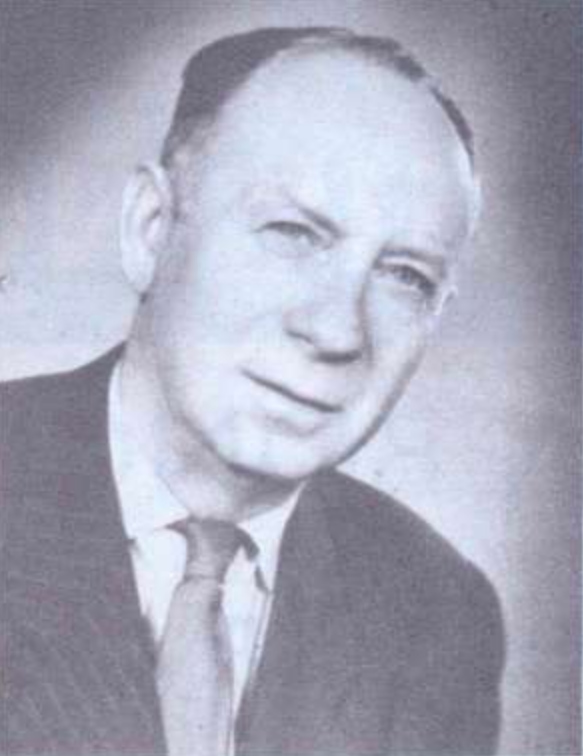
- Coloman Braun-Bogdan in 1968

Personal information
- Date of birth: 13 October 1905
- Place of birth: Arad, Austria-Hungary
- Date of death: 15 March 1983 (aged 77)
- Position: Midfielder

Senior career*
Years	Team	Apps	(Gls)
1920–1932	AMEF Arad		
1932–1934	Racing Club Calais		
1934–1938	Juventus București	42	(0)

Managerial career
- 1936–1937: Sportul Studențesc București
- 1937–1938: Juventus București
- 1940: Juventus București
- 1940–1945: Jiul Petroșani
- 1945: Romania
- 1946–1947: CFR București
- 1947: ASA București
- 1948: Dinamo București
- 1949: Romania
- 1953–1954: Flamura Roșie Arad
- 1958–1960: UTA Arad
- 1962–1963: Știința Timișoara
- 1963–1964: UTA Arad
- * Club domestic league appearances and goals

Coloman Braun-Bogdan (13 October 1905 – 15 March 1983) was a Romanian football midfielder and football manager.

== Playing career ==
Braun-Bogdan was born on 13 October 1905 in Arad, Arad County (then part of Austria-Hungary), and began playing football in 1920 when he was 14 years old at local club AMEF, making a name for himself as one of the best Romanian midfielders of the interwar period. In 1932 he went to play for two seasons in France at Racing Club Calais. Afterwards he joined Juventus București where he played with an interruption in the 1935–36 season until he ended his career. His final appearance as a footballer took place on 15 May 1938 in a 4–1 league victory against Universitatea Cluj. One of Braun-Bogdan's most important achievements as a player was being part of Romania's squad in the 1938 World Cup.

== Managerial career ==
In 1933, Braun-Bogdan took the coaching courses of the British football school from Folkestone, later studying in Romania at the O.N.E.F. School of Football. His coaching career began in 1936 at Sportul Studențesc București which he helped gain promotion from Divizia B to Divizia A while he was still an active player at Juventus București in Divizia A. In the 1937–38 Divizia A season he worked at Juventus as a player-coach, and finished the championship in 4th place, also earning a historical 5–1 victory that eliminated Ripensia Timișoara in the Cupa României, a team that eventually won the championship that season. In the following season, Braun-Bogdan worked only as a coach, earning another notable victory against Ripensia, this time a 7–2 in the league, but after finishing the first half in 8th place he was dismissed. Subsequently, in 1939 he was one of the founding members of the Romanian National School of Coaches. He came back to Juventus in the second half of the 1939–40 season, replacing Gyula Dobo who finished the first half in last place. Braun-Bogdan was unable to significantly improve the team's performance, managing to bring them just above the last place, which ultimately led to their relegation to Divizia B.

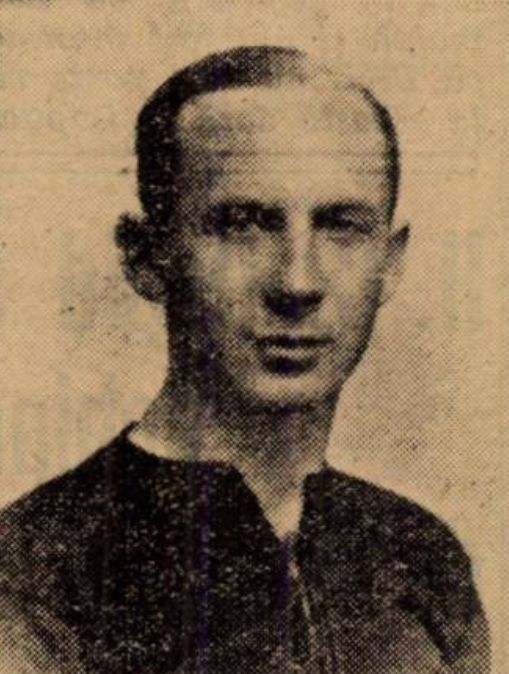
Coloman Braun-Bogdan c. 1940

In 1940, he went to coach Jiul Petroșani, helping the team win promotion to Divizia A. However, they did not get to play there as the championship was interrupted by World War II, but he continued to work for the club until 1945. In 1945 he had a short spell as Romania's national team coach, leading them in a friendly which ended in a 7–2 away loss to Hungary. In the 1946–47 season Braun-Bogdan worked at CFR București where he helped the club finish in 5th place in the league, being appreciated by the fans. However, he moved in 1947 to a newly founded club, ASA București where he was dismissed after 15 rounds because of poor results. In 1948 he became the first coach of Dinamo București where he also had a short spell, staying only a few rounds, including the first derby against his former team, ASA, that ended in a 1–0 victory for his side. In 1949, Braun-Bogdan had his second experience at Romania's national team, this time leading them together with Emerich Vogl in a 1–1 home friendly draw against Albania. Braun-Bogdan had the most successful spell of his career from 1953 until 1954, when he coached a team from his native Arad, Flamura Roșie, winning the only trophies of his career which are the 1953 Cupa României after a 1–0 victory in extra-time against CCA București and the 1954 Divizia A. He then worked for the Romanian Football Federation as an advisor and also was president of the Central College of Coaches until 1958. Subsequently, he had a second experience at Flamura Roșie which this time was named UTA Arad. Then he went for the 1962–63 season at Știința Timișoara with whom he finished the championship in 3rd place. Braun-Bogdan left Știința after a conflict with some of the team's players, going for a third spell at UTA. There, after a 3–3 draw against Știința on their field, the fans of the home team who felt disadvantaged by the referee attacked the locker rooms of the referees and UTA's players, eventually getting into a big fight with the miliția officers. This event marked the beginning of the rivalry between the two teams, which would later be known as the West derby. Afterwards, he retired from coaching and went to work again for the Romanian Football Federation. During his managerial career in the Romanian top-division, Divizia A, he totaled 230 matches, consisting of 89 victories, 51 draws, and 90 losses.

== Writing ==
Braun-Bogdan wrote two books about moments from his playing and managerial football career:

- Fotbalul în glumă (Football as a Joke)
- Din lumea balonului rotund (From the World of the Round Ball)

== Death ==
Braun-Bogdan died on 15 March 1983 at age 77, being remembered as the first coach that worked at all three Bucharest rivals: CFR, ASA and Dinamo.

== Honours ==
=== Manager ===
Sportul Studențesc București

- Divizia B: 1936–37

Jiul Petroșani

- Divizia B: 1940–41

UTA Arad

- Divizia A: 1954
- Cupa României: 1953
