= 1947–48 Divizia A =

31st season of top-tier football league in Romania

Divizia A
- Season: 1947–48
- Champions: ITA Arad
- Top goalscorer: Ladislau Bonyhádi (49)

The 1947–48 Divizia A was the thirty-first season of Divizia A, the top-level football league of Romania.

== Teams ==
Divizia A 1947-48 team distribution

== League table ==
Pos	Team	Pld	W	D	L	GF	GA	GD	Pts	Qualification or relegation
1	ITA Arad (C)	30	22	6	2	129	31	+98	50	Champions of Romania
2	CFR Timișoara	30	21	3	6	84	43	+41	45	
3	CFR București	30	20	2	8	87	42	+45	42	
4	Universitatea Cluj	30	14	6	10	58	50	+8	34	
5	Distribuția București	30	13	7	10	69	50	+19	33	
6	Libertatea Oradea	30	10	10	10	52	49	+3	30	
7	CFR Cluj	30	9	10	11	48	52	−4	28	
8	Ciocanul București	30	12	4	14	43	47	−4	28	
9	RATA Târgu Mureş	30	12	4	14	55	64	−9	28	
10	Jiul Petroșani	30	10	7	13	46	65	−19	27	
11	Dermata Cluj (R)	30	7	11	12	41	50	−9	25	Qualification to relegation play-offs
12	CSM Mediaș (O)	30	10	5	15	48	77	−29	25	Qualification to relegation play-offs
13	FC Ploiești (R)	30	10	4	16	48	86	−38	24	Qualification to relegation play-offs
14	ASA București (O)	30	8	6	16	44	66	−22	22	Qualification to relegation play-offs
15	Unirea Tricolor București (R)	30	8	5	17	51	86	−35	21	Relegation to Divizia B
16	UD Reșița (R)	30	7	4	19	45	90	−45	18	Relegation to Divizia B

Source: LT
Rules for classification: 1) points; 2) goal average; 3) number of goals scored
(C) Champions; (O) Play-off winners; (R) Relegated

=== Results ===
Home \ Away	ASA	CFR	CLU	CFT	MED	CIO	DER	DIS	PLO	ITA	JIU	LIB	RAT	REȘ	UCJ	UTB
ASA București	—	0–1	0–1	2–4	3–0	0–0	0–0	1–2	1–2	1–6	1–3	2–1	2–0	3–0	1–2	2–2
CFR București	2–0	—	0–2	4–0	6–1	2–3	0–3	2–0	9–1	2–5	3–1	3–2	3–0	7–2	4–0	5–0
CFR Cluj	2–1	1–5	—	5–0	1–1	3–1	3–2	2–2	1–1	2–2	1–1	4–3	1–1	7–0	1–3	2–2
CFR Timișoara	7–1	1–1	3–0	—	2–3	2–1	1–0	5–2	4–0	0–1	3–0	2–0	3–2	6–1	6–1	6–3
CSM Mediaș	4–3	1–3	2–1	2–3	—	0–0	3–1	3–1	1–2	2–5	4–1	1–1	4–2	3–2	1–1	1–2
Ciocanul	0–0	0–1	2–1	1–2	0–1	—	2–0	2–5	2–0	1–3	1–4	5–0	4–2	0–0	3–1	4–1
Dermata Cluj	1–2	2–3	2–2	0–2	0–0	3–1	—	2–2	2–2	1–1	0–0	2–0	2–1	1–1	1–1	1–0
Distribuția	1–3	3–2	6–0	1–1	8–2	1–0	1–0	—	5–1	2–2	3–1	1–4	0–0	5–0	2–0	1–2
FC Ploiești	3–2	3–0	2–0	1–4	4–0	2–3	1–4	1–5	—	2–4	3–2	1–1	5–0	1–0	1–1	2–1
ITA Arad	7–0	0–2	1–0	2–2	8–2	4–0	6–2	3–0	11–0	—	12–0	8–0	8–2	6–0	3–0	4–2
Jiul Petroșani	3–3	1–6	0–0	0–3	1–0	1–2	2–0	4–2	4–2	1–1	—	1–1	3–0	4–2	0–0	3–0
Libertatea Oradea	2–2	1–3	2–0	3–2	3–0	3–0	0–0	0–0	7–1	1–1	3–0	—	1–0	5–1	2–0	2–2
RATA	3–1	1–0	4–1	3–1	5–1	2–1	2–2	3–1	2–1	1–3	2–1	1–1	—	0–2	2–1	5–2
UD Reșița	1–2	2–5	0–0	2–5	2–3	1–2	1–4	0–6	3–1	0–1	3–1	3–2	5–3	—	3–4	4–0
U Cluj	2–0	3–0	2–4	1–2	5–2	2–1	3–0	4–1	5–2	2–0	0–1	1–1	3–1	1–1	—	4–0
Unirea Tricolor	4–5	3–3	1–0	0–2	1–0	0–1	7–3	0–0	2–0	1–11	4–2	2–0	1–5	2–3	4–5	—

Source: LT (in Romanian)
Legend: Blue = home team win; Yellow = draw; Red = away team win.

== Top goalscorers ==
Rank	Player	Club	Goals
1	Ladislau Bonyhádi	ITA Arad	49
2	Bazil Marian	CFR București	32
3	Petre Bădeanțu	CFR Timișoara	22
3	Eugen Iordache	Distribuția București	22
3	Iosif Kovács	CFR Timișoara	22

== Champion squad ==
ITA Arad

Goalkeepers: Alexandru Marky (29 / 0).
Defenders: Iosif Slivăț (12 / 0); Moise Vass (27 / 0); Zoltan Farmati (26 / 9).
Midfielders: Ioan Reinhardt (23 / 1); Adalbert Pall (28 / 0); József Pecsovszky (15 / 3); Gheorghe Băcuț (26 / 4).
Forwards: Adalbert Kovács (26 / 19); Andrei Mercea (25 / 12); Ladislau Bonyhádi (25 / 49); Iosif Stibinger (26 / 12); Nicolae Dumitrescu (27 / 17); Camil Schertz (4 / 0).
(league appearances and goals listed in brackets)

Manager: Petre Steinbach.

== See also ==
- 1947–48 Divizia B
