= Ioan Reinhardt =

Romanian footballer (1920–1993)

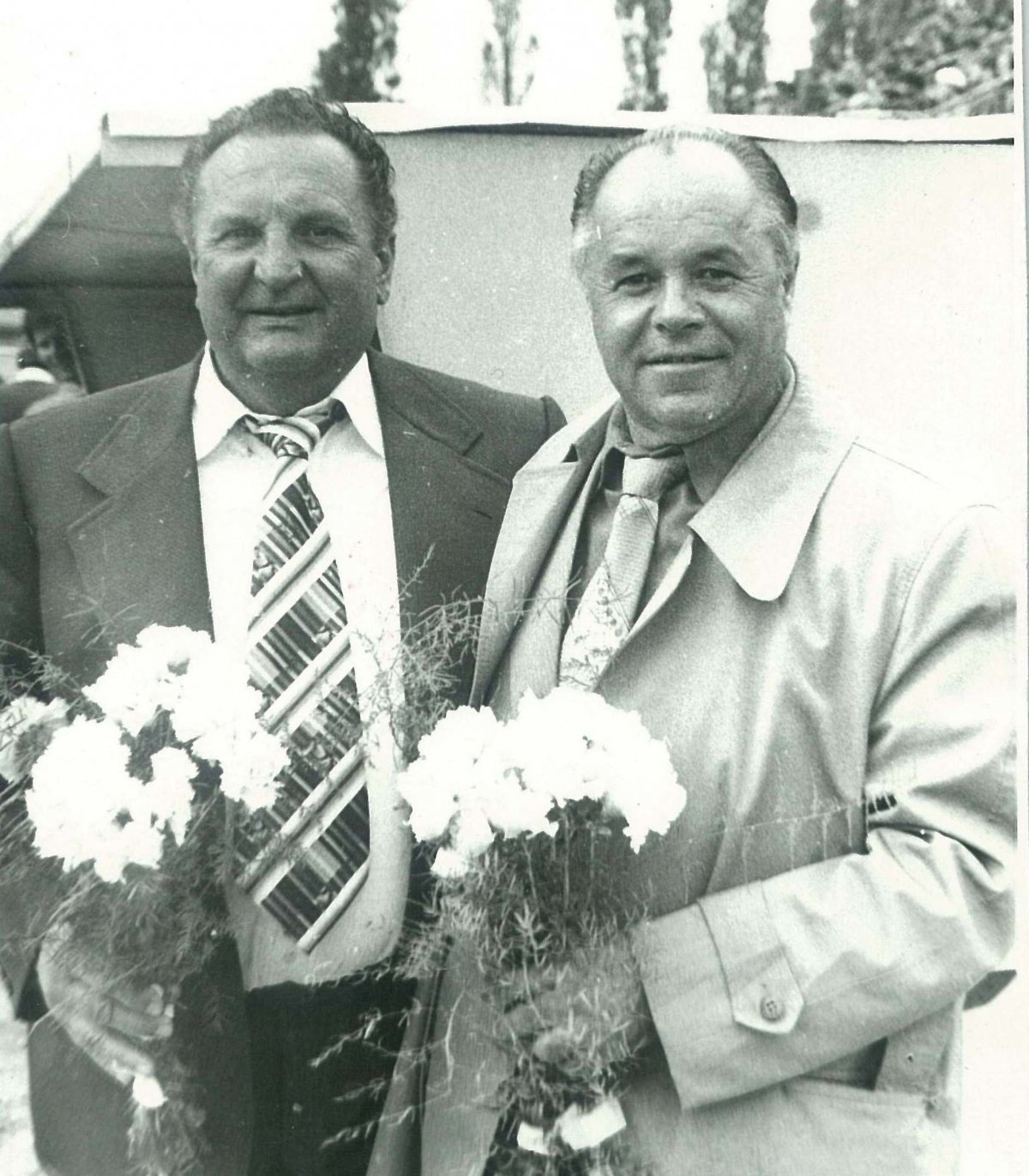
- Reinhardt (left) and Dumitrescu (right) as coaches of UTA Arad.

Personal information
- Date of birth: 9 January 1920
- Place of birth: Arad, Romania
- Date of death: 6 June 1993 (aged 73)
- Place of death: Reșița, Romania
- Position: Midfielder

Youth career
- CA Arad
- AMEF Arad

Senior career*
Years	Team	Apps	(Gls)
1937–1940	AMEF Arad	35	(–)
1940–1945	Kolozsvári AC	32	(8)
1945–1953	Flamura Roșie Arad	135	(7)
Total		202	(15)

Managerial career
- 1953–1956: Locomotiva Arad
- 1956: Flamura Roșie Arad
- 1957–1960: UTA Arad (assistant)
- 1960–1962: UTA Arad
- 1962–1963: UTA Arad (assistant)
- 1965–1971: UTA Arad (assistant)
- 1971–1977: CSM Reșița
- 1977–1978: Bihor Oradea
- * Club domestic league appearances and goals

Ioan Reinhardt (also known as János Radnai; born 9 January 1920 – 6 June 1993) was a Romanian football player and manager. A midfielder, he played in 202 matches for AMEF Arad, Kolozsvári AC and Flamura Roșie Arad and scored 15 goals. Reinhardt won three titles and two Romanian Cups with Flamura.

== Manager career ==
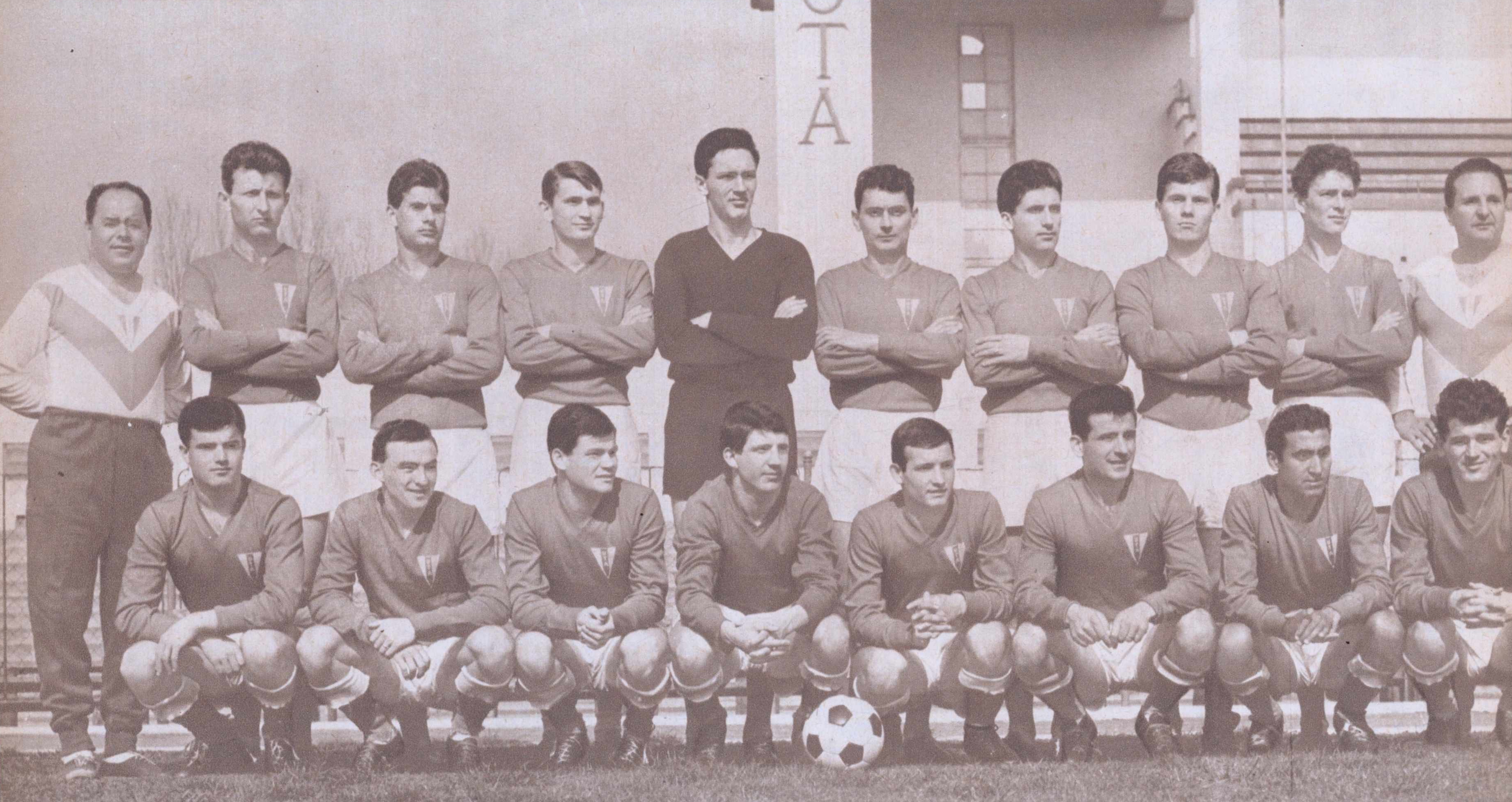
Reinhardt (back row, first from the right) as assistant coach of UTA Arad in 1966

After retirement, Reinhardt was the manager of Locomotiva Arad until 1956, when he signed a contract with UTA Arad (former Flamura Roșie). Reinhardt was the manager of UTA in other two seasons, 1960–61 and 1961–62 and in all of its three spells, Nicolae Dumitrescu was his assistant coach. During 1962–63 season he was the assistant manager of famous József Pecsovszky, subsequently making team again with Nicolae Dumitrescu, this time with Dumitrescu as manager and Reinhardt as assistant coach. This period was the most successful in the history of UTA Arad, club which under the leadership of Dumitrescu–Reinhardt duo won another two titles, played a Romanian Cup final and eliminated the great team of Feyenoord during the 1970–71 European Cup season. At that time, Feyenoord were the defending champions.

Reinhardt left UTA in 1971 and moved to CSM Reșița, in the second league. In his first season, former UTA manager promoted "Milan from Banat" in the top-flight and maintained it at that level until 1977. In the autumn of 1977, Reinhardt was sacked and Cicerone Manolache was hired as the new manager. CSM relegated at the end of that season and since then, that period remained the most constant and successful period for the club, after World War II. With this results, Reinhardt entered in Reșița's hall of fame as well.

At short time after he left CSM, Reinhardt was named as the manager of FC Bihor Oradea, a first tier club at that time. At the end of the season, FC Bihor saved from relegation and Reinhardt left his mark once again, in decisive way. During this short period, former UTA's player and manager was helped by Alexandru Muta as assistant coach, while important players such as Paul Popovici, Ioan Naom or Attila Kun were part of the squad.

After this season, Reinhardt retired from the football management. He died in June 1993, exactly in the day in which UTA promoted back to Divizia A, after 11 years of absence. The date of death is unclear, but most probably 6 June 1993.

== Honours ==
=== Player ===
UTA Arad

- Divizia A: 1946–47, 1947–48, 1950
- Cupa României: 1947–48, 1953; runner-up 1950

Kolozsvári AC

- Magyar Kupa runner-up: 1943–44

=== Manager ===
UTA Arad

- Divizia A: 1968–69, 1969–70
- Cupa României runner-up: 1965–66

CSM Reșița

- Divizia B: 1971–72
