= 1958–59 Divizia B =

Divizia B
- Season: 1958–59
- Promoted: Minerul Lupeni
- Relegated: None

The 1958–59 Divizia B was the 19th season of the second tier of the Romanian football league system.

The format with two series has been maintained, both of them having 14 teams. At the end of the season only the winner of the first series promoted to Divizia A, because the winner of the second series was ineligible for promotion and no teams relegated to Regional Championship, because the format will be expanded again starting with the next season.

== Team changes ==
=== To Divizia B ===
Promoted from Divizia C

- CFR Iași
- Titanii București
- Știința Craiova
- Gloria Bistrița

Relegated from Divizia A

- Energia Recolta Târgu Mureș
- Progresul Oradea

=== From Divizia B ===
Relegated to Divizia C

- Partizanul Reghin
- Progresul CPCS București
- CFR Cluj
- CSU București

Promoted to Divizia A

- Știința Cluj
- Farul Constanța

=== Renamed teams ===
CFR Iași was renamed Unirea Iași.

Dinamo Bârlad was renamed Rulmentul Bârlad.

Dinamo Obor București was renamed Pompierul București.

Energia Recolta Târgu Mureș was renamed CS Târgu Mureș.

Metalul Reșița was renamed CSM Reșița.

Minerul Baia Mare was renamed CSM Baia Mare.

Progresul Oradea was renamed CS Oradea.

Progresul Sibiu was renamed CSA Sibiu.

Progresul Suceava was renamed Victoria Suceava.

Rapid II București was renamed TAROM București.

Știința Iași was renamed CSMS Iași.

Titanii București was renamed Metalul Titanii București.

=== Other changes ===
Dinamo Cluj was dissolved, all the players were moved to Dinamo Bacău, club which also took its place in the first league.

Dinamo Galați took the vacant place left in the second by Dinamo Bacău.

== League tables ==
=== Serie I ===
Pos	Team	Pld	W	D	L	GF	GA	GD	Pts	Promotion or relegation
1	Minerul Lupeni (C, P)	26	14	5	7	38	23	+15	33	Promotion to Divizia A
2	CFR Timișoara	26	13	5	8	40	24	+16	31	
3	CSA Sibiu	26	13	4	9	48	37	+11	30	
4	Corvinul Hunedoara	26	12	5	9	40	32	+8	29	
5	CSM Reșița	26	13	3	10	39	33	+6	29	
6	CFR Arad	26	11	7	8	37	34	+3	29	
7	CS Târgu Mureș	26	13	2	11	30	30	0	28	
8	Tractorul Orașul Stalin	26	10	6	10	40	37	+3	26	
9	Baia Mare	26	10	6	10	43	45	−2	26	
10	Gaz Metan Mediaș	26	11	4	11	35	37	−2	26	
11	IS Câmpia Turzii	26	10	4	12	37	35	+2	24	
12	AMEFA Arad	26	8	7	11	23	33	−10	23	
13	Știința Craiova	26	7	6	13	30	51	−21	20	
14	CS Oradea	26	4	2	20	22	51	−29	10	

Source: romaniansoccer.ro
Rules for classification: 1) Points 2) Head-to-head points; 3) Head-to-head goal difference; 4) Head-to-head goals scored; 5) Head-to-head away goals scored; 6) Goal difference; 7) Goals scored.
(C) Champions; (P) Promoted

=== Serie II ===
Pos	Team	Pld	W	D	L	GF	GA	GD	Pts	Promotion or relegation
1	TAROM București (C, P)	26	18	3	5	79	34	+45	39	Promotion to Divizia A
2	Metalul Titanii București	26	14	7	5	49	29	+20	35	
3	Flacăra Moreni	26	13	6	7	60	35	+25	32	
4	Poiana Câmpina	26	12	7	7	49	35	+14	31	
5	Unirea Iași	26	15	1	10	45	36	+9	31	
6	Pompierul București	26	10	6	10	45	34	+11	26	
7	Dinamo Galați	26	11	4	11	39	37	+2	26	
8	CSMS Iași	26	10	6	10	34	39	−5	26	
9	Foresta Fălticeni	26	7	8	11	19	32	−13	22	
10	Rulmentul Bârlad	26	9	4	13	36	66	−30	22	
11	Prahova Ploiești	26	5	9	12	36	58	−22	19	
12	Victoria Suceava	26	7	5	14	30	52	−22	19	
13	Unirea Focșani	26	6	6	14	39	56	−17	18	
14	Gloria Bistrița	26	8	2	16	34	51	−17	18	

Source: romaniansoccer.ro
Rules for classification: 1) Points 2) Head-to-head points; 3) Head-to-head goal difference; 4) Head-to-head goals scored; 5) Head-to-head away goals scored; 6) Goal difference; 7) Goals scored.
(C) Champions; (P) Promoted

== See also ==
- 1958–59 Divizia A
- 1958–59 Divizia C
- 1958–59 Regional Championship
- 1958–59 Cupa României
