= 1955 Divizia A =

38th season of top-tier football league in Romania

Divizia A
- Season: 1955
- Champions: Dinamo București
- Top goalscorer: Ion Ciosescu (18)

The 1955 Divizia A was the thirty-eighth season of Divizia A, the top-level football league of Romania.

== Teams ==
Location of teams in 1955 Divizia A

== League table ==
Pos	Team	Pld	W	D	L	GF	GA	GD	Pts	Qualification or relegation
1	Dinamo București (C)	24	15	7	2	42	19	+23	37	Qualification to European Cup first round
2	Flacăra Ploiești	24	14	6	4	46	20	+26	34	
3	Progresul București	24	13	7	4	39	22	+17	33	
4	Știința Timișoara	24	10	7	7	47	30	+17	27	
5	Flamura Roșie Arad	24	10	6	8	35	28	+7	26	
6	CCA București	24	8	7	9	38	26	+12	23	
7	Știința Cluj	24	8	7	9	27	35	−8	23	
8	Minerul Petroșani	24	8	6	10	26	33	−7	22	
9	Dinamo Orașul Stalin	24	8	6	10	30	39	−9	22	
10	Locomotiva Timișoara	24	7	7	10	29	36	−7	21	
11	Locomotiva Târgu Mureş (R)	24	6	8	10	26	33	−7	20	Relegation to Divizia B
12	Locomotiva Constanța (R)	24	5	5	14	19	45	−26	15	Relegation to Divizia B
13	Avântul Reghin (R)	24	3	3	18	19	57	−38	9	Relegation to Divizia B

Source: LT
Rules for classification: 1) points; 2) goal average; 3) number of goals scored
(C) Champions; (R) Relegated

=== Results ===
Home \ Away	AVÂ	CCA	DIN	DOS	FLA	FRA	CON	LTI	TÂR	MIP	PRO	ȘCJ	ȘTI
Avântul Reghin	—	1–9	0–0	1–0	0–1	1–2	1–1	4–1	2–0	2–3	0–1	0–2	0–4
CCA București	7–1	—	0–0	1–1	0–1	0–2	4–0	2–1	0–0	2–1	0–0	3–1	2–1
Dinamo București	1–1	2–1	—	3–1	1–1	2–0	4–1	2–1	6–1	2–1	0–1	0–0	1–0
Dinamo Orașul Stalin	1–0	2–1	1–2	—	0–1	1–1	2–1	0–0	3–0	3–0	1–1	5–1	2–2
Flacăra Ploiești	4–0	2–0	1–1	4–0	—	2–3	2–0	3–0	2–2	1–0	2–2	4–1	4–0
Flamura Roșie Arad	2–0	1–0	1–4	1–2	1–1	—	5–0	1–0	0–0	2–2	3–2	1–2	1–0
Locomotiva Constanța	4–0	1–0	0–1	1–2	1–4	1–0	—	1–1	1–1	0–0	0–0	3–0	0–1
Locomotiva Timișoara	2–0	2–0	5–1	1–1	1–0	2–2	3–0	—	0–3	0–1	2–1	1–1	1–6
Locomotiva Târgu Mureș	1–0	0–1	1–2	3–0	0–1	1–1	3–0	1–0	—	4–0	1–3	0–0	1–1
Minerul Petroșani	2–1	1–1	0–0	2–0	1–2	2–1	2–1	1–2	3–0	—	0–0	1–1	1–0
Progresul București	3–1	2–1	0–3	3–2	4–2	1–0	5–0	1–1	2–0	2–0	—	2–0	2–3
Știința Cluj	4–3	1–1	0–2	1–0	1–0	1–0	1–2	1–1	3–1	3–1	0–1	—	1–1
Știința Timișoara	2–0	2–2	1–2	8–0	1–1	1–4	3–0	3–1	2–2	3–1	0–0	2–1	—

Source: LT (in Romanian)
Legend: Blue = home team win; Yellow = draw; Red = away team win.

== Top goalscorers ==
Rank	Player	Club	Goals
1	Ion Ciosescu	Știința Timișoara	18
2	Constantin Dinulescu	Știința Timișoara	17
2	Nicolae Drăgan	Flacăra Ploiești	17
2	Titus Ozon	Progresul București	17
5	Nicolae Tătaru	CCA București	16

== Champion squad ==
Dinamo București

Goalkeepers: Petre Curcan (4 / 0), Florea Birtașu (18 / 0 ), Nicolae Panaghia (3 / 0).
Defenders: Gheorghe Băcuț (24 / 0), Ladislau Băcuț (24 / 0), Iosif Szökő (18 / 1).
Midfielders: Valeriu Călinoiu (22 / 1), Gheorghe Toma (24 / 0), Alexandru Nemeş (4 / 0), Florian Anghel (6 / 0).
Forwards: Carol Bartha (11 / 4); Onoriu Boian (8 / 1); Nicolae Dumitru (21 / 2); Alexandru Ene (23 / 14); Valeriu Neagu (23 / 10); Ion Suru (22 / 7); Nicolae Magheţ (11 / 2); Mihai Raica (1 / 0); Gheorghe Niţulescu (1 / 0).
(league appearances and goals listed in brackets)

Manager: Angelo Niculescu.

== See also ==
- 1955 Divizia B
- 1955 Regional Championship
- 1955 Cupa României
