= 1947–48 Cupa României =

Tournament details
- Country: Romania

Final positions
- Champions: ITA Arad
- Runners-up: CFR Timișoara

The 1947–48 Cupa României was the 11th edition of Romania's most prestigious football cup competition.

The title was won by ITA Arad against CFR Timișoara.

== Format ==
The competition is an annual knockout tournament.

In the first round proper, two pots are made, the first pot with Divizia A teams and other teams until 16 and the second pot with the rest of teams qualified in this phase. First-pot teams will play away. Each tie is played as a single leg.

In the first round proper, if a match is drawn after 90 minutes, the game goes in extra time, and if the score is still tied after 120 minutes, the team from the lower league will qualify.

In the rest of the rounds, if a match is drawn after 90 minutes, the game goes in extra time, and if the score is still tied after 120 minutes, the team who plays away will qualify.

In case the teams are from same city, a replay will be played.

In case the teams play in the final, a replay will be played.

From the first edition, the teams from Divizia A entered in competition in sixteen finals, rule which remained until today.

== First round proper ==
Team 1	Score	Team 2
16 March 1948
CSM Sighișoara (Div. C)	0–2	(Div. A) CFR Cluj
CAM Timișoara (Div. B)	2–0	(Div. A) Libertatea Oradea
17 March 1948
CFR Buzău (Div. B)	2–4	(Div. A) ASA București
Astra Română Moreni (Div. B)	0–5	(Div. A) CFR București
18 March 1948
Socec Lafayette București (Div. B)	4–0	(Div. A) FC Ploiești
Metalochimic București (Div. B)	2–1 (a.e.t.)	(Div. A) RATA Târgu Mureș
UM Cugir (Div. C)	1–4	(Div. A) CFR Timișoara
Țesătoria Română Pitești (Div. C)	1–0	(Div. A) Distribuția București
Concordia Ploiești (Div. B)	1–4	(Div. A) Oțelul Reșița
Foresta Reghin (Div. C)	1–3	(Div. A) Universitatea Cluj
Ripensia Timișoara (Div. B)	1–3	(Div. A) ITA Arad
CFR Târgoviște (Div. B)	1–3 (a.e.t.)	(Div. A) Unirea Tricolor București
CFR Turda (Div. C)	2–1	(Div. A) CS Mediaș
CFR Turnu Severin (Div. B)	1–1 (a.e.t.)	(Div. A) Jiul Petroșani
Minaur Zlatna (Div. C)	1–5	(Div. A) Dermata Cluj
24 March 1948
Politehnica Iași (Div. B)	1–1 (a.e.t.)	(Div. A) Ciocanul București

== Second round proper ==
Team 1	Score	Team 2
21 April 1948
Metalochimic București	2–4	Oțelul Reșița
Socec Lafayette București	2–5	CFR Timișoara
Universitatea Cluj	2–3	ITA Arad
Politehnica Iași	3–1	CFR Cluj
Țesătoria Română Pitești	1–0	CFR București
CAM Timișoara	3–1	ASA București
CFR Turda	9–3	Unirea Tricolor București
CFR Turnu Severin	3–1	Dermata Cluj

== Quarter-finals ==
Team 1	Score	Team 2
30 May 1948
CAM Timișoara	3–2	CFR Turda
13 June 1948
Politehnica Iași	1–0	Oțelul Reșița
24 June 1948
Țesătoria Română Pitești	0–1 (a.e.t.)	ITA Arad
27 June 1948
CFR Turnu Severin	0–2	CFR Timișoara

== Semi-finals ==
Team 1	Score	Team 2
8 August 1948
Politehnica Iași	2–3 (a.e.t.)	CFR Timișoara
CAM Timișoara	0–6	ITA Arad

== Final ==
15 August 1948
17:15 EET

ITA Arad	3–2	CFR Timișoara
A.Kovács 38'; Reinhardt 56'; Băcuț 82'	Report	I.Kovács 7'; Woronkowski 8'

Venus, Bucharest
Attendance: 10,000
Referee: Emil Kroner (Bucharest)

Cupa României 1947–48 winners

1st title
