= FC Craiova =

- Full name: Football Club Craiova
- Founded: 1940
- Dissolved: 1949

FC Craiova Football Club was founded in 1940 by the merging of two teams from Craiova and Dolj County: Craiu Craiovan Craiova and Rovine Griviţa Craiova. The newly created team qualified for Divizia A immediately, ranking ninth in the 1940–41 season. During the 1942–1943 Championship, FC Craiova ranked first place, but the competition did not take place officially, due to World War II.

The first official season after the war was the 1946–47 season, FC Craiova took last place, relegating it to Divizia B. Under the new name "AS Dolj", the team fell further, to Divizia C. During the 1948–49 season, AS Dolj ranked 8 in Divizia C Series I. Afterwards, the ranking season was abolished, dissolving the team.

== Performances ==
- Played in Divizia A (2): 1940–41, 1946–47
