= CS Târgu Mureș =

Romanian football club (1944–1960)

- Full name: Clubul Sportiv Târgu Mureș
- Short name: CS Târgu Mureș
- Founded: 1944 as ASM Târgu Mureș
- Dissolved: 1960
| Home colours | Away colours |

CS Târgu Mureș was a football club based in Târgu Mureș, Mureș County in central Romania. It was founded in 1944 and it soon became one of the best teams from Mureș. The club was dissolved in 1960.

== History ==
In 1944, the team of the railway workers, brought together the best players from Târgu Mureș, that previously played for MSE, MNKTE and MAV. The team participated in the local championship under the name of ASM Târgu Mureş.

In 1945 ASM became Dermagant and under this name the team promoted to Divizia A, in 1947, after a play-off match against Karres Mediaș. In 1947 the club changed its name to RATA, after the name of the factory, its main sponsor. In 1950 RATA became Locomotiva, and in 1955 it relegated to Divizia B. In 1955 the club changed his name again, this time to Avântul.

They were promoted to Divizia A for the second time, but returned to Divizia B after only one season. During this period, the club became CS Târgu Mureș, the last name it would bear. At the end of the 1959–60 season, it was relegated to the regional championship and, shortly afterwards, merged with Voința Târgu Mureș, thus giving rise to Mureșul Târgu Mureș for a second time.

The club played for 9 consecutive seasons in Divizia A and 10 in total, being the 2nd most successful team in the history of the city, after ASA Târgu Mureș. Its best position was 4th place at the end of the 1948–49 and 1952 seasons.

== Chronology of names ==
| Name | Period |
|---|---|
| ASM Târgu Mureş | 1944–1945 |
| Dermagant Târgu Mureş | 1945–1947 |
| RATA Târgu Mureş | 1947–1950 |
| Locomotiva Târgu Mureş | 1950–1955 |
| Avîntul Târgu Mureş | 1955–1956 |
| Recolta Târgu Mureş | 1956–1957 |
| Energia Recolta Târgu Mureş | 1957–1958 |
| CS Târgu Mureș | 1958–1960 |

== Honours ==
Liga I:

- Winners (0): Best finish: 4th (2): 1948–49, 1952

Liga II:

- Winners (1): 1956

== League history ==
| Season | Tier | Division | Place | Notes | Cupa României |
|---|---|---|---|---|---|
| 1959–60 | 2 | Divizia B (Seria III) | 14th | Relegated; dissolved | |
| 1958–59 | 2 | Divizia B (Seria I) | 7th | | |
| 1957–58 | 1 | Divizia A | 11th | Relegated | Round of 32 |
| 1956 | 2 | Divizia B (Seria I) | 1st (C) | Promoted | Round of 32 |
| 1955 | 1 | Divizia A | 11th | Relegated | Round of 32 |
| 1954 | 1 | Divizia A | 10th | | Round of 16 |
| 1953 | 1 | Divizia A | 7th | | Quarter-finals |
| 1952 | 1 | Divizia A | 4th | | Round of 32 |
| 1951 | 1 | Divizia A | 10th | | Round of 32 |
| 1950 | 1 | Divizia A | 9th | | Round of 32 |
| 1948–49 | 1 | Divizia A | 4th | | Round of 16 |
| 1947–48 | 1 | Divizia A | 9th | | Round of 32 |
| 1946–47 | 1 | Divizia A | 10th | | Not held |
| 1945–46 | – | Regional championship | – | Promoted to Divizia A | |
| 1944–45 | – | Regional championship | – | Founded as ASM Târgu Mureș | |
