= ACS Electrica Timișoara =

Romanian football club

Electrica Timișoara
- Full name: Asociația Club Sportiv; Electrica 1929 Timișoara
- Nicknames: Alb-Albaștrii (The White and Blues)
- Short name: Electrica
- Founded: 1929; 97 years ago
- Ground: Electrica
- Capacity: 5,000
- Chairman: Alin Ignea
- Manager: Bogdan Nicolescu
- League: not active at senior level
- 2023–24: Liga VI, Timiș County, Seria IV, 2nd (withdrew)

Asociația Club Sportiv Electrica 1929 Timișoara commonly known as Electrica Timișoara, or simply as Electrica is a Romanian amateur football club based in Timișoara, Timiș County. It is currently playing in the Liga VI, Seria III.

The colors of the team are white and blue.

== History ==
Until 1932, Electrica played in the western regional tournament, one of the five, before the winners would go to play in a knock-out tournament in the fall. Chinezul Timișoara was the team who usually won the tournaments. In 1932 the national league was created called Divizia A. Again, but this time Ripensia Timișoara took the lead and qualified to play in that league. As more teams were added in the 1933–1934 season a second division Divizia B was created, followed by 1936–37 Liga III season of the third division Liga III, where they finished 5th. The second division had two series, the clubs from the west side of the country played in Seria II.

The team now activates in the fifth league, Timis County league, Seria III. In the last decade the club focused its attention in growing players for other teams so the academy had very good results at the regional and national level.

== Honours ==
Liga III

- Best place 5th: 1936–37

Liga IV – Timiș County

- Winners (2): 1992–93, 1995–96

== Grounds ==
Stadionul Electrica is a multi-purpose stadium in Timișoara, Romania. It is currently used mostly for football matches and is the home ground of Electrica Timișoara, ACS Poli Timișoara and Ripensia Timișoara. The stadium holds 5,000 people and is located in the Fabric neighbourhood. In the past it was also the home ground of Politehnica II Timișoara.

In the past, Stadionul UMT, which was placed just a few meters away, was named also as Stadionul Electrica, fact that created some confusion over time.

== Rivalries ==
The traditional rivals of Electrica in the interwar period were Chinezul Timișoara, Politehnica Timișoara and Ripensia Timișoara, that last from the same neighborhood, Fabric.

Later on UM Timișoara and CFR Timișoara.

== Former managers ==
- (Romania) Rudolf Wetzer (1936–1938)
- (Romania) Adalbert Kovács (1960–1962)
