= 1940–41 Divizia A =

29th season of top-tier football league in Romania

Divizia A
- Season: 1940–41
- Champions: Unirea Tricolor București
- Top goalscorer: Ion Bogdan; Valeriu Niculescu (21)

The 1940–41 Divizia A was the twenty-ninth season of Divizia A, the top-level football league of Romania.

== Teams ==
Location of teams in 1940-41 Divizia A

== League table ==
Pos	Team	Pld	W	D	L	GF	GA	GD	Pts	Qualification
1	Unirea Tricolor București (C)	24	19	0	5	62	25	+37	38	Champions of Romania
2	Rapid București	24	15	5	4	57	27	+30	35	
3	Venus București	24	14	4	6	65	34	+31	32	
4	Ripensia Timișoara	24	13	6	5	58	32	+26	32	
5	Mica Brad	24	12	0	12	51	43	+8	24	
6	Sportul Studențesc București	24	10	3	11	48	51	−3	23	
7	UD Reșița	24	9	5	10	59	58	+1	23	
8	Gloria Arad	24	9	4	11	46	48	−2	22	
9	FC Craiova	24	8	5	11	38	58	−20	21	
10	FC Ploiești	24	7	4	13	34	59	−25	18	
11	Universitatea Cluj-Sibiu	24	8	1	15	42	58	−16	17	
12	Gloria CFR Galaţi	24	5	6	13	27	41	−14	16	
13	FC Brăila	24	4	1	19	31	90	−59	9	

Source: LT
Rules for classification: 1) points; 2) goal difference; 3) number of goals scored
(C) Champions

=== Notes ===
- Carpaţi Baia Mare did not start because of the Second Vienna Award, which meant the city of Baia Mare became part of Hungary.
- Crișana Oradea, the winner of Seria III of 1939–40 Divizia B, was also under the Hungarian occupation, so the runner-up FC Universitatea Cluj was promoted.
- The newly promoted FC Universitatea Cluj moved to Sibiu so they could play in Divizia A under the name Universitatea Sibiu, because Cluj-Napoca was under Hungarian occupation.
- CAM Timișoara and AMEF Arad were banned for political reasons, due to being workers' teams. AMEF Arad was enrolled in the Arad district league.
- FC Craiova and Gloria Arad were promoted to replace these 2 teams.
- Franco-Româna Brăila, the winner of Seria IV of 1939–40 Divizia B, was banned due to being a worker team, so it was replaced by FC Brăila.

=== Results ===
Home \ Away	BRĂ	CRA	PLO	GLA	GAL	MIC	RAP	RIP	SPO	UDR	UTB	UCJ	VEN
FC Brăila	—	0–2	1–1	3–4	4–2	2–4	1–4	1–4	0–6	5–3	0–2	4–2	0–2
FC Craiova	6–2	—	3–2	3–3	0–0	1–0	1–2	2–1	0–0	5–3	0–1	1–0	2–3
FC Ploiești	5–0	1–1	—	1–0	1–0	1–3	2–2	2–2	3–1	3–1	3–1	2–0	1–4
Gloria Arad	3–0	1–2	3–0	—	1–0	1–0	1–7	2–3	2–0	2–0	1–2	4–2	6–0
Gloria CFR Galaţi	3–0	1–1	4–1	1–1	—	4–2	0–0	1–4	2–1	1–4	1–2	0–1	1–1
Mica Brad	3–0	4–2	4–0	3–2	3–0	—	0–1	3–2	4–2	1–3	1–3	3–0	4–1
Rapid București	3–0	5–0	3–1	3–1	4–0	1–0	—	0–0	6–3	7–1	4–1	0–0	0–0
Ripensia Timișoara	3–2	5–1	3–0	2–2	2–0	3–4	3–0	—	1–3	2–2	3–0	5–1	3–1
Sportul Studențesc București	4–1	3–1	4–1	2–1	3–2	2–1	0–1	0–0	—	4–1	0–4	3–4	0–6
UD Reșița	8–0	8–3	4–1	2–2	2–0	3–2	1–2	0–0	2–2	—	3–0	4–1	1–1
Unirea Tricolor București	6–1	3–0	5–0	4–1	2–0	2–0	5–1	0–3	3–1	3–0	—	5–0	2–0
Universitatea Cluj	0–3	3–0	6–1	6–2	0–3	4–2	1–0	1–3	1–2	7–3	2–3	—	0–3
Venus București	10–1	7–1	4–1	2–0	1–1	3–0	5–1	1–4	4–2	4–0	0–3	2–0	—

Source: LT
Legend: Blue = home team win; Yellow = draw; Red = away team win.

== Top goalscorers ==
Rank	Player	Club	Goals
1	Ion Bogdan	Rapid București	21
1	Valeriu Niculescu	Unirea Tricolor București	21
3	Iosif Kovács	Ripensia Timișoara	20
4	Ilie Cricitoiu	Unirea Tricolor București	18
4	Vasile Pop	UD Reșița	18

== Champion squad ==
Unirea Tricolor București

Goalkeepers: Anghel Crețeanu (2 / 0); Vasile Cristea (22 / 0).
Defenders: Gheorghe Petrescu (23 / 0); Ilie Iliescu (19 / 0); Constantin Marinescu (6 / 0).
Midfielders: Nicolae Florea (22 / 0); Constantin Anghelache (24 / 0); Ion Boteanu (18 / 0); Nicolae Cristescu (3 / 0); Fabian Brădescu (5 / 0).
Forwards: Nicolae Lulu Mihăilescu (18 / 11); Ion Dumitrescu (24 / 5); Valeriu Niculescu (20 / 21); Tudor Paraschiva (7 / 2); Ștefan Cârjan (12 / 0); Alecu Andrei (9 / 0); Ioan Bodea (6 / 1); Theodoru Criciotoiu (24 / 18).
(league appearances and goals listed in brackets)

Manager: Ștefan Cârjan.

== See also ==
- 1940–41 Divizia B
