= CSF CFR Timișoara =

Association football team in Romania

CFR Timișoara
- Full name: Club Sportiv de Fotbal; CFR 1933 Timișoara
- Nicknames: Feroviarii (The Railwaymen); Leoparzii vișinii (The Burgundy Leopards); Alb-Vișinii (The White and Burgundies); Echipa de la Gara Mare (The team at Big Station)
- Short name: CFR
- Founded: 1933; 93 years ago as Sparta CFR Timișoara
- Ground: CFR
- Capacity: 7,000
- Chairman: Constantin Nedela
- Manager: Dănuț Bilia
- League: Liga VI
- 2025–26: Liga VI, Timiș County, Seria IV, 7th
- Website: https://www.csfcfrtimisoara1933.com/
Home colours	Away colours

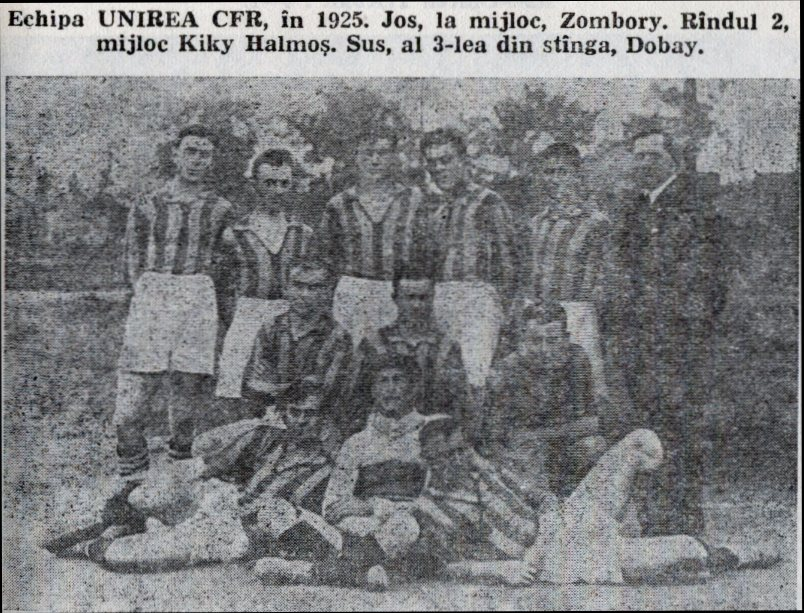
Unirea CFR Timișoara in 1925

Chart showing the progress of CFR's league finishes from 1946 to the present.

Club Sportiv de Fotbal CFR 1933 Timișoara, commonly known as CFR Timișoara (Romanian pronunciation: [t͡ʃefeˌre timiˈʃo̯ara]), is a Romanian football club based in Timișoara, Timiș County. The club currently competes in Liga VI – Timiș County, the 6th tier of Romanian football.

Founded in 1933, the railway team from Timișoara shares a fierce rivalry with city rivals Politehnica Timișoara. The club's best moment came in the 1947–48 season, finishing 2nd in Divizia A and reaching the Romanian Cup final.

In recent years, the club has become better known for its futsal team and women's football team.

== History ==
Originally founded in 1919 as Sparta CFR Timișoara, the club merged with Unirea Timișoara in 1926, adopting the name Sparta Unirea CFR Timișoara. In 1927 it was dissolved only to be founded again five years later in 1933 as CFR Timișoara.

The team made only two national divisional appearances until World War II, finished 5th in the 1937–38 season in the Western League of Divizia C and 6th in the Series I of Divizia B in the 1940–41 season. It also participated in Series I of the Heroes Cup, a competition that replaced Divizia B during the war, finishing 2nd in 1942–43 and 3rd in 1943–44.

In the 1945–46 season, CFR finished 2nd in the Timișoara City Championship, and in the summer of 1946, after a play-off against Politehnica Timișoara, won 4–2 on aggregate (1–1 and 3–1), securing promotion to Divizia A. The squad led by player-coach Rudolf Kotormány was composed, among others, of Ciopraga, I. Barna, Munteanu, Covejdeanu, Volariu, I. Ritter, Raniță, Csapo, Gh. Moniac, P. Cojereanu, N. Reuter, Bandu, E. Avasilichioaie, P. Bădeanțu.

In the first post-war season of Divizia A, CFR finished in 3rd place under the guidance of coach Balázs Hoksary. In the 1947–48 season, Hoksary led the Railwaymen to finish as runners-up, five points behind ITA Arad, and reached the final of Cupa României, losing 2–3 to the same ITA at Venus Stadium in Bucharest. The squad included A. Boroș – I. Barna, Șt. Rodeanu – P. Cojereanu, I. Ritter, C. Voroncovschi – Gh. Moniac, N. Reuter, I. Kovács, E. Avasilichioaie, P. Bădeanțu.

In the following season, CFR finished 5th and reached the quarter-finals of Cupa României, suffering a narrow 0–1 defeat to CSU Cluj. Renamed Locomotiva in 1950, the Railwaymen secured 4th place and once again fell in the quarter-finals, this time losing 1–2 to Flamura Roșie Arad. The 1951 campaign brought an 8th-place finish, along with a heavy 0–4 loss in the Round of 16 of Cupa României against city rivals Știința Timișoara.

In the 1952 season, Balázs Hoksary returned to the team, and the Railwaymen finished 7th while making another quarter-final appearance in Cupa României, bowing out 0–3 to Progresul Oradea. Iosif Lengheriu was appointed as the next coach, but a slight decline followed with a 10th-place finish in 1953 before rebounding to 4th place in 1954. That same year, another deep cup run ended in the quarter-finals, this time with a 0–2 defeat to Metalul Reșița. In the 1955 season, relegation was narrowly avoided with a 10th-place finish, just one point above the drop zone.

The struggles continued in 1956. Lengheriu was dismissed midway through the season and replaced by Dumitru Pavlovici, but the campaign ended with an 11th-place finish and relegation to the second division. Despite this setback, Cupa României once again provided a bright spot, as the team reached the quarter-finals before falling 0–1 to Energia Câmpia Turzii. The lineup included Franciscovici, Corbuș, Ivanenco, Gal, Lengel, Don, Szekeli, Scorțan, I. Kovács, Avasilichioaiei, and Bădeanțu.

Following relegation, the team at Gara Mare (lit. 'Big Station') was renamed CFR Timișoara and spent the next eight seasons in Divizia B. Former player Iosif Kovács led the Railwaymen for the next three years, guiding them to a 9th-place finish in Series I of the 1957–58 season, a runners-up spot in 1958–59, just two points behind Minerul Lupeni, and 6th place in the 1959–60 season, with the Railwaymen placed in Series II after Divizia B was expanded from two to three series of 14 teams.

Adalbert Androvits took charge for the next two seasons, leading the White and Burgundies to consecutive 4th-place finishes in Series III in 1960–61 and 1961–62, the latter under the name CSO Timișoara after a name change in the summer of 1961. The club reverted to the CFR name at the start of the 1962–63 season and, under new head coach Vasile Gain, finished as runners-up, seven points behind Crișul Oradea.

The 1963–64 season saw another format change in the second division, reducing it to two series of 14 teams each. Competing in Series II, the Railwaymen secured a 3rd-place finish. The following season ended in an unexpected relegation to the third division after finishing last in Series II. However, the White and Burgundies managed to bounce back the following year, winning the West Series of Divizia C under the leadership of coach Nicolae Godeanu and securing promotion. Back in Divizia B, CFR Timișoara was placed in Series II, where it ranked 4th in the 1966–67 season, 3rd in 1967–68, and 11th in 1968–69.

In 1969–70, a reorganization of football in Timișoara took place, during which CFR assigned some of its players to Politehnica Timișoara, including Panici, Seceleanu, Mafa, and Calinin. Although not among the favorites for promotion, the Railwaymen produced a major surprise by returning to Divizia A after thirteen years, under the leadership of Petru Becker, who took charge after the seventh round. The squad included Ludovic Tatar, Ștefan Korek, Nicolae Hangan, Petre Mehedințu, Mircea Răcelescu, Petre Speriosu, Gheorghe Chimiuc, Arsenie Hergan, Victor Cioroparu, Constantin Gorduna, Ion Periat, Cicerone Manolache, Teodor Floareș, Nicolae Fodor, Gheorghe Marks, Dumitru Stoian, Ion Brîndă, and Ioan Voicău.

The happiness of the CFR lasted only one year (1970–71), as the team returned to Divizia B, where it remained until 1979, when it was relegated to Divizia C. From here, after only one year, it returned to the second tier where it remained until 1986. It spent another two years in the 3rd division (1986–1988) and still had an honorable participation in Divizia B, which ended, at the end of the 1996–97 championship, with another three years in Divizia C, where, at the end of the 1999–2000 championship (17th place in the IV series), it was relegated to the county championship.

In the 2003–04 season it returned to Divizia C, and in 2004–05 it was promoted to second division, where it evolved until the 2009–10 season, when it was excluded from the championship due to financial arrears to two former players, but also because they failed to pay arbitration fees.

== Honours ==
=== Leagues ===
Liga I

- Runners-up (1): 1947–48

Liga II

- Winners (1): 1969–70
- Runners-up (3): 1958–59, 1962–63, 1990–91

Liga III

- Winners (4): 1965–66, 1979–80, 1987–88, 2004–05

Liga IV – Timiș County

- Winners (3): 2000–01, 2001–02, 2002–03

Liga V – Timiș County

- Winners (1): 2010–11

=== Cups ===
Cupa României

- Runners-up (1): 1947–48

== League history ==
Season	Tier	Division	Place	Notes
2026–27	6	Liga VI (Timiș County, Series IV)	TBD	
2025–26	6	Liga VI (Timiș County, Series IV)	7th	9 points from 18 matches
2024–25	6	Liga VI (Timiș County, Series IV)	5th	28 points from 21 matches
2023–24	6	Liga VI (Timiș County, Series IV)	8th	16 points from 18 matches
2022–23	6	Liga VI (Timiș County, Series III)	9th	19 points from 14 matches
2021–22	6	Liga VI (Timiș County, Series III)	—	CFR competed in Series III; surviving AJF records include its league matches.
2020–21	—	—	—	The results are nowhere to be found; but the club's futsal team won promotion to Liga I.
2019–20	6	Timișoara Municipal Championship	—	Season interrupted; CFR was registered in the municipal championship.
2018–19	6	Timișoara Municipal Championship	6th	7 points from 12 matches
2017–18	6	Timișoara Municipal Championship	10th	4 points from 18 matches
2016–17	6	Timișoara Municipal Championship	8th	7 points from 14 matches
2015–16	4	Liga IV Timiș	17th (R)	15 points from 32 matches
2014–15	4	Liga IV Timiș	16th	26 points from 34 matches; spared relegation.
2013–14	4	Liga IV Timiș	14th	31 points from 32 matches
2012–13	4	Liga IV Timiș	6th	64 points from 34 matches.
2011–12	4	Liga IV Timiș	3rd	Finished third behind CSM Lugoj and FC Chișoda.
2010–11	5	Liga V (Timiș County)	1st (C, P)	Promoted to Liga IV.
2009–10	2	Liga II (Series II)	18th	Excluded from the championship; its results were annulled.
2008–09	2	Liga II (Series II)	16th	Spared from relegation
2007–08	2	Liga II (Series II)	13th	39 points from 34 matches.
2006–07	2	Liga II (Series II)	14th	45 points from 34 matches.
2005–06	2	Divizia B (Series III)	7th	36 points from 28 matches.
2004–05	3	Divizia C (Series VI)	1st (C, P)	55 points from 24 matches; promoted to Divizia B.
2003–04	3	Divizia C (Series VII)	5th	38 points from 26 matches.
2002–03	4	Liga IV Timiș	1st (C, P)	Third consecutive county title; promoted to Divizia C.
2001–02	4	Liga IV Timiș	1st (C)	County champions.
2000–01	4	Liga IV Timiș	1st (C)	County champions.
1999–2000	3	Divizia C (Series IV)	17th (R)	Relegated to the county championship.
1998–99	3	Divizia C (Series IV)	14th	47 points from 36 matches.
1997–98	3	Divizia C (Series IV)	10th	48 points from 34 matches.
1996–97	2	Divizia B (Series II)	18th (R)	Relegated to Divizia C.
1995–96	2	Divizia B (Series II)	8th	
1994–95	2	Divizia B (Series II)	3rd	
1993–94	2	Divizia B (Series II)	10th	32 points from 34 matches.
1992–93	2	Divizia B (Series II)	16th	
1991–92	2	Divizia B (Series II)	4th	
1990–91	2	Divizia B (Series III)	2nd	
1989–90	2	Divizia B (Series III)	5th	
1988–89	2	Divizia B (Series III)	8th	34 points from 34 matches.
1987–88	3	Divizia C (Series VIII)	1st (C, P)	65 points from 30 matches; promoted to Divizia B.
1986–87	3	Divizia C (Series VIII)	3rd	53 points from 30 matches.
1985–86	2	Divizia B (Series III)	15th (R)	30 points from 34 matches; relegated to Divizia C.
1984–85	2	Divizia B (Series III)	8th	
1983–84	2	Divizia B (Series III)	12th	
1982–83	2	Divizia B (Series III)	14th	
1981–82	2	Divizia B (Series III)	12th	
1980–81	2	Divizia B (Series III)	9th	34 points from 34 matches.
1979–80	3	Divizia C (Series VIII)	1st (C, P)	47 points from 30 matches; promoted to Divizia B.
1978–79	2	Divizia B (Series III)	18th (R)	26 points from 34 matches; relegated to Divizia C.
1977–78	2	Divizia B (Series III)	7th	34 points from 34 matches.
1976–77	2	Divizia B (Series III)	4th	36 points from 34 matches.
1975–76	2	Divizia B (Series III)	6th	
1974–75	2	Divizia B (Series III)	9th	
1973–74	2	Divizia B (Series III)	13th	
1972–73	2	Divizia B (Series II)	11th	
1971–72	2	Divizia B (Series II)	11th	28 points from 30 matches.
1970–71	1	Divizia A	16th (R)	Relegated to Divizia B.
1969–70	2	Divizia B (Series II)	1st (C, P)	Promoted to Divizia A.
1968–69	2	Divizia B (Series II)	11th	
1967–68	2	Divizia B (Series II)	3rd	
1966–67	2	Divizia B (Series II)	4th	
1965–66	3	Divizia C (West Series)	1st (C, P)	38 points from 26 matches; promoted to Divizia B.
1964–65	2	Divizia B (Series II)	14th (R)	Relegated to Divizia C.
1963–64	2	Divizia B (Series II)	3rd	31 points from 26 matches.
1962–63	2	Divizia B (Series III)	2nd	30 points from 26 matches.
1961–62	2	Divizia B (Series III)	4th	Competed as CSO Timișoara; 31 points from 26 matches.
1960–61	2	Divizia B (Series III)	4th	32 points from 26 matches.
1959–60	2	Divizia B (Series II)	6th	27 points from 26 matches.
1958–59	2	Divizia B (Series I)	2nd	31 points from 26 matches.
1957–58	2	Divizia B (Series I)	9th	24 points from 26 matches.
1956	1	Divizia A	11th (R)	Relegated to Divizia B.
1955	1	Divizia A	10th	
1954	1	Divizia A	4th	
1953	1	Divizia A	10th	
1952	1	Divizia A	7th	
1951	1	Divizia A	8th	
1950	1	Divizia A	4th	Competed as Locomotiva Timișoara.
1948–49	1	Divizia A	5th	
1947–48	1	Divizia A	2nd	League runners-up and Cupa României runners-up.
1946–47	1	Divizia A	3rd	First season in the national top division.
1945–46	2	Timișoara City Championship	2nd	Won play-off and promoted
1943–44	Wartime	Heroes' Cup (Series I)	3rd	CFR was third after eight matches when the wartime competition was abandoned.
1942–43	Wartime	Heroes' Cup (Series I)	2nd	15 points from 14 matches.
1940–41	2	Divizia B (Series I)	6th	18 points from 18 matches.
1937–38	3	Divizia C (West League, Series I)	5th	23 points from 18 matches; first documented national divisional season.

== Notable former players ==
The footballers mentioned below have played at least 1 season for CFR Timișoara and also played in Liga I for another team.

- (Romania) Adalbert Androvits
- (Romania) Alin Artimon
- (Romania) Petre Bădeanțu
- (Romania) Florin Bătrânu
- (Romania) Aurel Boroș
- (Romania) Ion Dumitru
- (Romania) Adorian Himcinschi
- (Romania) Adalbert Kovács
- (Romania) Iosif Kovács
- (Romania) Daniel Mutu
- (Romania) Cicerone Manolache
- (Romania) Dumitru Pavlovici
- (Romania) Iosif Ritter
- (Romania) Nicolae Reuter
- (Romania) Simion Surdan
- (Romania) Aurel Șunda
- (Romania) Gabriel Torje
- (Romania) Valentin Velcea

== Former managers ==
- (Romania) Rudolf Kotormány (1946)
- (Romania) Balázs Hoksary (1946–1949)
- (Romania) Balázs Hoksary (1952)
- (Romania) Iosif Lengheriu (1953–1956)
- (Romania) Dumitru Pavlovici (1956)
- (Romania) Iosif Kovács (1957–1960)
- (Romania) Adalbert Androvits (1960–1962)
- (Romania) Vasile Gain (1962–1969)
- (Romania) Dumitru Macri (1971)
- (Romania) Cicerone Manolache (1971–1972)
- (Romania) Iosif Lengheriu (1974–1976)
- (Romania) Ion V. Ionescu (1976–1977)
- (Romania) Leonida Nedelcu (1987)
- (Romania) Lazăr Pârvu (2001–2002)
- (Romania) Alin Artimon (2007)
- (Romania) Octavian Grigore (2008)
- (Romania) Dan Potocianu & Florin Bătrânu (2008–2009)
