= Faur București =

- Full name: Football Club Faur București
- Founded: 1935
- Dissolved: 2005
- Ground: Stadionul Faur, Bucharest
- Capacity: 3,000
Home colours	Away colours

Faur București was a football club based in Bucharest, Romania.

== History ==
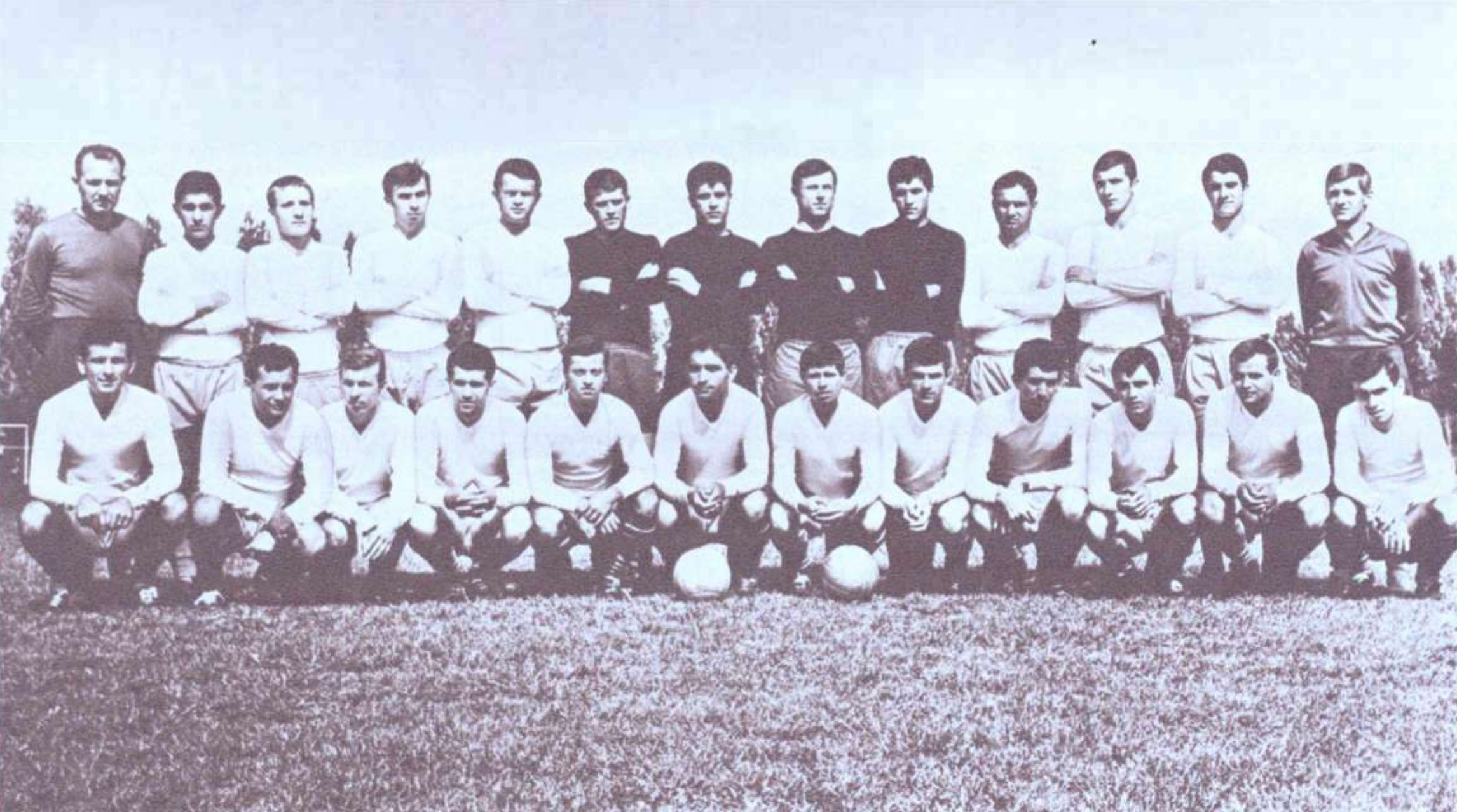
Metalurgistul squad in 1967

The club was established in 1935 as Metalul by workers at Malaxa. Prior to World War II they were known as Titanii and Rogifer. After the nationalisation of Malaxa, the club was renamed 23 August before becoming Metalochimic. In 1947–48 the club won promotion from Divizia B into Divizia A. However, they finished second bottom of the division the following season, and were relegated back to Divizia B. The club was later renamed Energia and then back to Metalul again. The club's junior team won the national championship in 1970 and 1980.

Following the Romanian Revolution in 1989, the club became Faur București. It folded in 2005.

== Chronology of names ==
Club name	Period
Metalul București	1935–1937
Titanii București	1937–1941
Rogifer București	1941–1945
23 August București	1945–1947
Metalochimic București	1947–1949
Metalul București	1949–1955
Energia București	1955–1957
Titanii București	1957–1958
Metalul Titanii București	1958–1960
Metalul București	1960–1965
Metalurgistul București	1965–1967
Metalul București	1967–1991
Faur București	1991–2005

== Honours ==
Divizia B

- Winners (1): 1947–48
- Runners-up (4): 1950, 1958–59, 1972–73, 1978–79

Divizia C

- Winners (2): 1957–58, 1986–87

== Former managers ==
- (Romania) Augustin Botescu (1948–1949)
- (Romania) Ion Bălănescu (1955–1960)
- (Romania) Gheorghe Petrescu (1960–1963)
- (Romania) Gheorghe Petrescu (1966–1968)
- (Romania) Leon Lazăr (1974)
- (Romania) Gheorghe Petrescu (1974)
- (Romania) Paul Popescu (1975–1979)
- (Romania) Carol Creiniceanu (1979–1980)
- (Romania) Ștefan Coidum (1981–1982)
- (Romania) Nicolae Oaidă (1983–1984)

== See also ==
- Category:Faur București players
