= Unirea Tricolor București =

- Full name: Unirea Tricolor București
- Nicknames: Uniriştii (Unionists); Albaștrii (The Blues); Oborenii (The team from Obor)
- Short name: Unirea Tricolor
- Founded: 16 August 1914; 112 years ago
- Dissolved: 1958
Home colours	Away colours

Unirea Tricolor București was a Romanian football club from Bucharest, south-east Romania, founded in 1914 as Tricolor București. It was one of the most famous inter-war clubs in Romania.

== History ==
=== Tricolor București ===
Tricolor, first named Teiul, was set up in 1914, in the district of Obor, by some high-school students. Among the first players was Costel Rădulescu, a 1930s coach and manager of the Romania national team and co-founder of the modern national championship system (league system).

After World War I, the club became champion of the Bucharest Region and played in the final tournament of the National Championship.

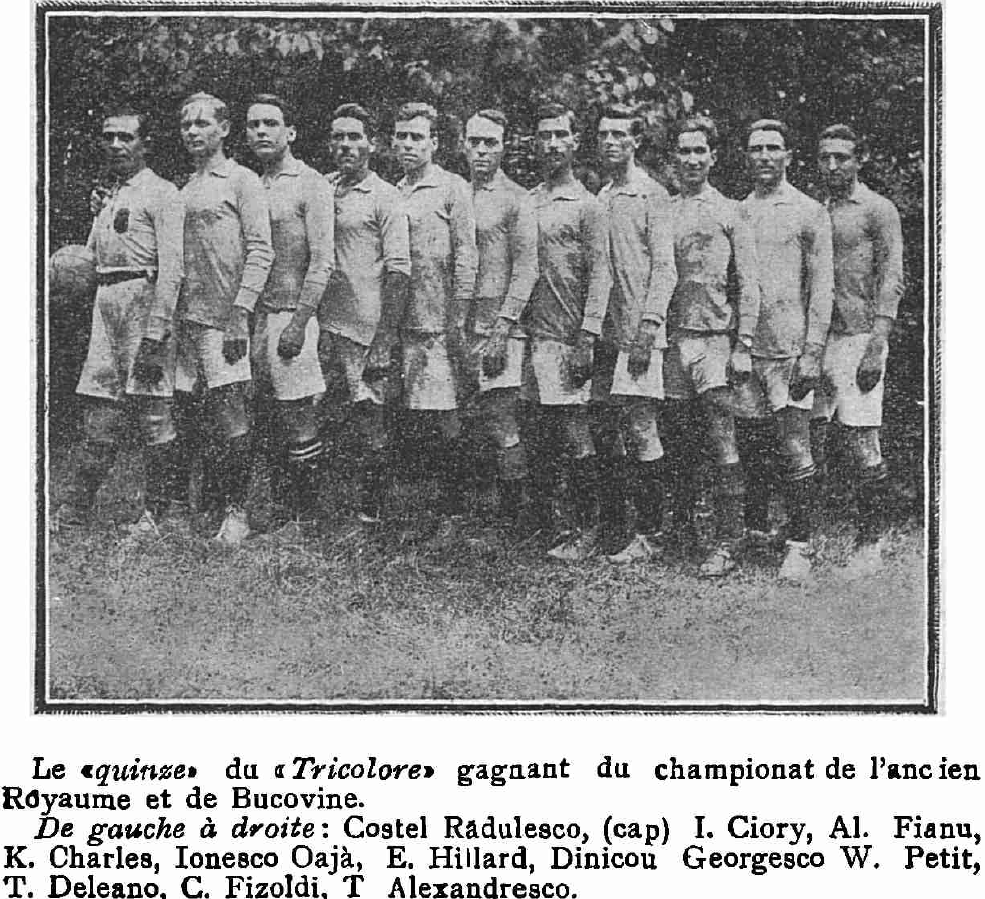
Tricolor squad in 1922

They finished once runner-up in the Liga I in 1919–20 and once they won the national championship in 1920–21. In 1921–22 the club was knocked out in the semifinals by Victoria Cluj after the team from Bucharest failed to appear, so it lost the game with 0–3, by administrative decision.

On September 23, 1923, the team wins the first game of a Romanian club against a former Yugoslavian club (Beogradski Belgrad: 2–1).

In 1926 it merged with "Unirea" taking on the name of Unirea Tricolor. Unirea, was founded in 1924, after the merging of "Orizontul" and "Zburătorii", in the same district of Obor as the above Tricolorul.

=== Unirea Tricolor București ===
The President and owner of the team was Nicolae Lucescu, and a famous public character around Unirea Tricolor was Titi Barosanu, a leader of the fans.

In 1947–1948, due to Communist regime norms (stating that all sports associations had to join a form of trade-union, or a governmental institution), the team is taken over by the Ministry of Internal Affairs and, on May 14, 1948, merged with another club, Ciocanul București (former Maccabi), the new teams being named Dinamo "A" and Dinamo "B".

In the 1947–1948 season, they played as Dinamo "A" (Ciocanul) and Dinamo "B" (Unirea Tricolor), and next season, in Divizia A remained only one, Dinamo "A" (later Dinamo București), Dinamo "B" (Unirea Tricolor) being relegated to the Divizia B.

In the 1950 season Dinamo "B" (Unirea Tricolor) moved to Braşov as Dinamo Braşov, in 1957–1958 it moved again, this time to Cluj-Napoca, only to disappear after the 1957–58 season after the team was dissolved and the players were relocated to Dinamo Bacău.

== Chronology of names ==
Name	Period
Teiul București	1914–1918
Tricolor București	1918–1926
Unirea Tricolor București	1926–1948
Dinamo B București	1948–1950
Dinamo Braşov	1950–1957
Dinamo Cluj	1957–1958

== Honours ==
Liga I:

- Winners (2): 1920–21, 1940–41

Liga II:

- Winners (4): 1938–39, 1946–47, 1948–49, 1950

Romanian Cup:

- Runners-up (2): 1935–36, 1940–41

== Notable former players ==
- Ion Bogdan
- Traian Iordache
- Valeriu Niculescu
- Ștefan Stănculescu
- Petre Steinbach
- Ernest Hillard
- Titus Ozon

== Bibliography ==
Mihai Ionescu, Mircea Tudoran – Fotbal de la A la Z. Fotbalul românesc de-a lungul anilor, București, Editura Sport-Turism, 1984

== League history ==
Season	Tier	Division	Place	Notes
1957–58	1	Divizia A	9th	Dinamo Cluj; dissolved
1957	—	Cupa Primăverii (Group I)	5th	Unofficial
1956	1	Divizia A	7th	Dinamo Brașov
1955	1	Divizia A	9th	
1954	1	Divizia A	8th	
1953	1	Divizia A	4th	
1952	1	Divizia A	10th	
1951	1	Divizia A	9th	Dinamo Orașul Stalin
1950	2	Divizia B (Series I)	1st (C)	Promoted
1948–49	2	Divizia B (Series II)	1st (C)	No promotion
1947–48	1	Divizia A	15th	Relegated; became Dinamo B
1946–47	2	Divizia B (Series I)	1st (C)	Promoted
1944–46	No official national league held			
1943–44	—	Wartime championship	2nd	Abandoned
1942–43	—	Wartime championship	3rd	Unofficial
1941–42	—	Cupa Basarabiei	—	Unofficial
1940–41	1	Divizia A	1st (C)	Champions
1939–40	1	Divizia A	9th	
1938–39	2	Divizia B (East Series, Group South)	1st (C)	Promoted
1937–38	1	Divizia A (Group I)	6th	Relegated
1936–37	1	Divizia A	12th	
1935–36	1	Divizia A	11th	
1934–35	1	Divizia A	9th	
1933–34	1	Divizia A (Group II)	2nd	
1932–33	1	Divizia A (Group II)	3rd	
1931–32	2	Bucharest Regional Championship	3rd	Selected for Divizia A
1930–31	2	South League	2nd	Bucharest champions
1929–30	2	Bucharest Regional Championship	4th	
1928–29	2	Bucharest Regional Championship	4th	
1927–28	2	Bucharest Regional Championship	4th	
1926–27	1	Divizia A	Semi-finals	Merged; regional champions
1925–26	2	Bucharest–Ploiești Regional Championship	7th	
1924–25	2	Bucharest–Ploiești Regional Championship	2nd	
1923–24	2	Bucharest–Ploiești Regional Championship	2nd	
1922–23	2	Bucharest–Ploiești Regional Championship	Semi-finals	
1921–22	1	Divizia A	Semi-finals	Regional champions
1920–21	1	Divizia A	1st (C)	Champions
1919–20	1	Divizia A	2nd	
1916–19	No championship because of World War I			
1914–16	—	Bucharest local competitions	—	Founded as Teiul

Champions
Runners-up
Third place
Relegated
