= 1941 Cupa României final =

- Event: 1940–41 Cupa României
| Rapid București | Unirea Tricolor București |
| 4 | 3 |
- Date: 7 September 1941
- Venue: ONEF, Bucharest
- Referee: Mihail Petrescu (Bucharest)
- Attendance: 9,000

The 1941 Cupa României final was the 8th final of Romania's most prestigious football cup competition. It was disputed between Unirea Tricolor București and Rapid București, and was won by Rapid București after a game with 7 goals. It was the sixth cup for Rapid, and the five of six consecutive successes.

== Match details ==
7 September 1941
16:00 EET

| Rapid București | 4–3 | Unirea Tricolor București |
|---|---|---|
| Florian 4'; Baratky 48'; Bogdan 49', 52' | Report | Criciotoiu 31' (pen.), 55', 75' |

ONEF, Bucharest
Attendance: 9,000
Referee: Mihail Petrescu (Bucharest)

| GK | 1 | (Romania) Robert Sadowski |
| DF | 2 | (Romania) Remus Ghiurițan |
| DF | 3 | (Romania) Iosif Lengheriu |
| MF | 4 | (Romania) Vintilă Cossini |
| MF | 5 | (Romania) Gheorghe Rășinaru |
| MF | 6 | (Romania) Ioan Wetzer III |
| FW | 7 | (Hungary) Vilmos Sipos |
| FW | 8 | (Romania) Ioachim Moldoveanu |
| FW | 9 | (Romania) Iuliu Baratky |
| FW | 10 | (Romania) Florian Radu |
| FW | 11 | (Romania) Ion Bogdan |
Manager:
(Romania) Iuliu Baratky

| GK | 1 | (Romania) Vasile Cristea |
| DF | 2 | (Romania) Ilie Iliescu |
| DF | 3 | (Romania) Constantin Marinescu |
| MF | 4 | (Romania) Nicolae Florea |
| MF | 5 | (Romania) Constantin Anghelache |
| MF | 6 | (Romania) Tudor Paraschiva |
| FW | 7 | (Romania) Ioan Bodea |
| FW | 8 | (Romania) Ion Dumitrescu |
| FW | 9 | (Romania) Valeriu Niculescu |
| FW | 10 | (Romania) Ștefan Cârjan |
| FW | 11 | (Romania) Theodoru Cricitoiu |
Manager:
(Romania) Ștefan Cârjan

== See also ==
- List of Cupa României finals
