= List of Cupa României finals =

The following is a list of all finals of the Romanian football cup competition called Cupa României. (Note: Subject to legal challenge: see Steaua București football records dispute)

== Results ==
Season	Winner	Score	Runner-up	Venue
1933–34; Details	Ripensia Timișoara	3–2; 5–0 (Replay); Details	Universitatea Cluj	Electrica, Timișoara; ONEF, Bucharest
1934–35; Details	CFR București	6–5 (a.e.t.); Details	Ripensia Timișoara	ONEF, Bucharest
1935–36; Details	Ripensia Timișoara	5–1; Details	Unirea Tricolor București	Venus, Bucharest
1936–37; Details	Rapid București	5–1; Details	Ripensia Timișoara	ONEF, Bucharest
1937–38; Details	Rapid București	3–2; Details	CAM Timișoara (II)	Giulești, Bucharest
1938–39; Details	Rapid București	2–0; Details	Sportul Studențesc București	Venus, Bucharest
1939–40; Details	Rapid București	2–2 (a.e.t.); 4–4 (a.e.t.)(1st Replay); 2–2 (a.e.t.)(2nd Replay); 2–1(3rd Replay); Details	Venus București	ONEF, Bucharest; ONEF, Bucharest; Giulești, Bucharest; ONEF, Bucharest
1940–41; Details	Rapid București	4–3; Details	Unirea Tricolor București	ONEF, Bucharest
1941–42; Details	Rapid București	7–1; Details	Universitatea Cluj-Sibiu	Venus, Bucharest
1942–43; Details	CFR Turnu Severin	4–0; Details	Sportul Studențesc București	ONEF, Bucharest
1943–1947	The cup was not played because of World War II.			
1947–48; Details	ITA Arad	3–2; Details	CFR Timișoara	Venus, Bucharest
1948–49; Details	CCA București	2–1; Details	CSU Cluj	ICAS, Bucharest
1950; Details	CCA București	3–1; Details	Flamura Roșie Arad	Republicii, Bucharest
1951; Details	CCA București	3–1 (a.e.t.); Details	Flacăra Mediaș (II)	Republicii, Bucharest
1952; Details	CCA București	2–0; Details	Flacăra Ploiești	Republicii, Bucharest
1953; Details	Flamura Roșie Arad	1–0 (a.e.t.); Details	CCA București	23 August, Bucharest
1954; Details	Metalul Reșița (II)	2–0; Details	Dinamo București	Republicii, Bucharest
1955; Details	CCA București	6–3 (a.e.t.); Details	Progresul Oradea (II)	Republicii, Bucharest
1956; Details	Progresul Oradea	2–0; Details	Energia Câmpia Turzii (II)	Republicii, Bucharest
1957–58; Details	Ştiinţa Timișoara	1–0; Details	Progresul București	23 August, Bucharest
1958–59; Details	Dinamo București	4–0; Details	CSM Baia Mare (II)	23 August, Bucharest
1959–60; Details	Progresul București	2–0; Details	Dinamo Obor București (II)	Republicii, Bucharest
1960–61; Details	Arieșul Turda (II)	2–1; Details	Rapid București	Republicii, Bucharest
1961–62; Details	Steaua București	5–1; Details	Rapid București	23 August, Bucharest
1962–63; Details	Petrolul Ploiești	6–1; Details	Siderurgistul Galați (II)	23 August, Bucharest
1963–64; Details	Dinamo București	5–3; Details	Steaua București	23 August, Bucharest
1964–65; Details	Ştiinţa Cluj	2–1; Details	Dinamo Piteşti	Republicii, Bucharest
1965–66; Details	Steaua București	4–0; Details	UTA Arad	23 August, Bucharest
1966–67; Details	Steaua București	6–0; Details	Foresta Fălticeni (III)	23 August, Bucharest
1967–68; Details	Dinamo București	3–1 (a.e.t.); Details	Rapid București	23 August, Bucharest
1968–69; Details	Steaua București	2–1; Details	Dinamo București	23 August, Bucharest
1969–70; Details	Steaua București	2–1; Details	Dinamo București	23 August, Bucharest
1970–71; Details	Steaua București	3–2; Details	Dinamo București	23 August, Bucharest
1971–72; Details	Rapid București	2–0; Details	Jiul Petroșani	23 August, Bucharest
1972–73; Details	Chimia Râmnicu Vâlcea (II)	1–1 (a.e.t.); 3–0 (Replay); Details	Constructorul Galați (III)	23 August, Bucharest; 23 August, Bucharest
1973–74; Details	Jiul Petroșani	4–2; Details	Politehnica Timișoara	23 August, Bucharest
1974–75; Details	Rapid București (II)	2–1 (a.e.t.); Details	Universitatea Craiova	23 August, Bucharest
1975–76; Details	Steaua București	1–0; Details	CSU Galați	23 August, Bucharest
1976–77; Details	Universitatea Craiova	2–1; Details	Steaua București	Republicii, Bucharest
1977–78; Details	Universitatea Craiova	3–1; Details	Olimpia Satu Mare	Republicii, Bucharest
1978–79; Details	Steaua București	3–0; Details	Sportul Studențesc București	23 August, Bucharest
1979–80; Details	Politehnica Timișoara	2–1 (a.e.t.); Details	Steaua București	23 August, Bucharest
1980–81; Details	Universitatea Craiova	6–0; Details	Politehnica Timișoara	23 August, Bucharest
1981–82; Details	Dinamo București	3–2; Details	FC Baia Mare (II)	23 August, Bucharest
1982–83; Details	Universitatea Craiova	2–1; Details	Politehnica Timișoara	23 August, Bucharest
1983–84; Details	Dinamo București	2–1; Details	Steaua București	23 August, Bucharest
1984–85; Details	Steaua București	2–1; Details	Universitatea Craiova	23 August, Bucharest
1985–86; Details	Dinamo București	1–0; Details	Steaua București	23 August, Bucharest
1986–87; Details	Steaua București	1–0; Details	Dinamo București	23 August, Bucharest
1987–88; Details	Steaua București	1–1; Details	Dinamo București	23 August, Bucharest
1988–89; Details	Steaua București	1–0; Details	Dinamo București	Municipal, Brașov
1989–90; Details	Dinamo București	6–4; Details	Steaua București	23 August, Bucharest
1990–91; Details	Universitatea Craiova	2–1; Details	FC Bacău	Național, Bucharest
1991–92; Details	Steaua București	1–1 (a.e.t.) (3–2 p); Details	Politehnica Timișoara	Regie, Bucharest
1992–93; Details	Universitatea Craiova	2–0; Details	Dacia Unirea Brăila	Național, Bucharest
1993–94; Details	Gloria Bistrița	1–0; Details	Universitatea Craiova	Regie, Bucharest
1994–95; Details	Petrolul Ploiești	1–1 (a.e.t.) (5–3 p); Details	Rapid București	Național, Bucharest
1995–96; Details	Steaua București	3–1; Details	Gloria Bistrița	Național, Bucharest
1996–97; Details	Steaua București	4–2; Details	Național București	Național, Bucharest
1997–98; Details	Rapid București	1–0; Details	Universitatea Craiova	Național, Bucharest
1998–99; Details	AFC Steaua Bucuresti	2–2 (a.e.t.) (4–2 p); Details	Rapid București	Național, Bucharest
1999–2000; Details	Dinamo București	2–0; Details	Universitatea Craiova	Național, Bucharest
2000–01; Details	Dinamo București	4–2; Details	Rocar București	Național, Bucharest
2001–02; Details	Rapid București	2–1; Details	Dinamo București	Național, Bucharest
2002–03; Details	Dinamo București	1–0; Details	Național București	Național, Bucharest
2003–04; Details	Dinamo București	2–0; Details	Oțelul Galați	Cotroceni, Bucharest
2004–05; Details	Dinamo București	1–0; Details	Farul Constanța	Cotroceni, Bucharest
2005–06; Details	Rapid București	1–0 (a.e.t.); Details	Național București	Național, Bucharest
2006–07; Details	Rapid București	2–0; Details	Politehnica Timișoara	Dan Păltinișanu, Timișoara
2007–08; Details	CFR Cluj	2–1; Details	Unirea Urziceni	Ceahlăul, Piatra Neamț
2008–09; Details	CFR Cluj	3–0; Details	Politehnica Timișoara	Tudor Vladimirescu, Târgu Jiu
2009–10; Details	CFR Cluj	0–0 (a.e.t.) (5–4 p); Details	FC Vaslui	Emil Alexandrescu, Iași
2010–11; Details	FCSB	2–1; Details	Dinamo București	Silviu Ploieșteanu, Brașov
2011–12; Details	Dinamo București	1–0; Details	Rapid București	Arena Națională, Bucharest
2012–13; Details	Petrolul Ploiești	1–0; Details	CFR Cluj	Arena Națională, Bucharest
2013–14; Details	Astra Giurgiu	0–0 (a.e.t.) (4–2 p); Details	FCSB	Arena Națională, Bucharest
2014–15; Details	FCSB	3–0; Details	Universitatea Cluj	Arena Națională, Bucharest
2015–16; Details	CFR Cluj	2–2 (a.e.t.) (5–4 p); Details	Dinamo București	Arena Națională, Bucharest
2016–17; Details	FC Voluntari	1–1 (a.e.t.) (5–3 p); Details	Astra Giurgiu	Ilie Oană, Ploiești
2017–18; Details	Universitatea Craiova	2–0; Details	Hermannstadt (II)	Arena Națională, Bucharest
2018–19; Details	Viitorul Constanța	2–1 (a.e.t.); Details	Astra Giurgiu	Ilie Oană, Ploiești
2019–20; Details	FCSB	1–0; Details	Sepsi Sfântu Gheorghe	Ilie Oană, Ploiești
2020–21; Details	Universitatea Craiova	3–2 (a.e.t.); Details	Astra Giurgiu	Ilie Oană, Ploiești
2021–22; Details	Sepsi Sfântu Gheorghe	2–1; Details	FC Voluntari	Superbet Arena, Bucharest
2022–23; Details	Sepsi Sfântu Gheorghe	0–0 (a.e.t.) {{pso|5–4 Details	Universitatea Cluj	Municipal, Sibiu
2023–24; Details	Corvinul Hunedoara (II)	2–2 (a.e.t.) (3–2 p); Details	Oțelul Galați	Municipal, Sibiu
2024–25; Details	CFR Cluj	3–2; Details	FC Hermannstadt	Francisc von Neuman, Arad
2025–26; Details	Universitatea Craiova	0–0 (a.e.t.) (6–5 p); Details	Universitatea Cluj	Municipal Stadium, Sibiu

== See also ==
- List of Romanian football champions

=== Notes ===
- (II) – Clubs representing Divizia B at the moment of the final.
- (III) – Clubs representing Divizia C at the moment of the final.
