= Mircea Luca =

Romanian former footballer

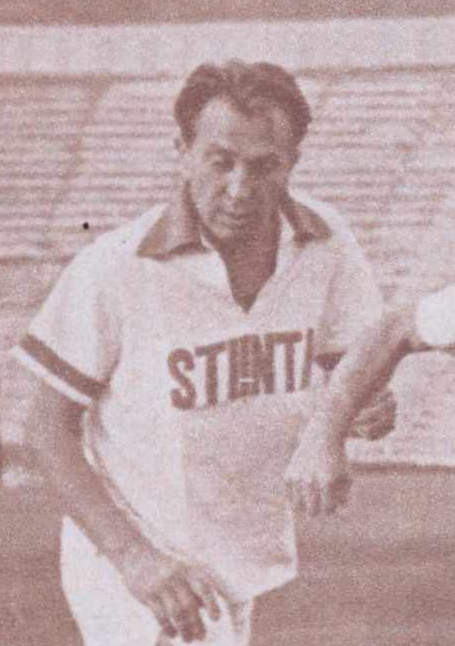
- Luca in 1963

Personal information
- Date of birth: 3 August 1921
- Place of birth: Zalău, Kingdom of Romania
- Date of death: 29 July 2008 (aged 86)
- Place of death: Cluj-Napoca, Romania
- Position: Central defender

Youth career
- 1932–1939: Universitatea Cluj

Senior career*
Years	Team	Apps	(Gls)
1939–1956	Universitatea Cluj	201	(3)

Managerial career
- 1964: Universitatea Cluj
- 1973: Universitatea Cluj
- * Club domestic league appearances and goals as of 1 January 2020

Mircea Luca (3 August 1921 – 29 July 2008) was a Romanian football defender, manager and president at Universitatea Cluj.

== Playing career ==
"An ideal centre-back, unsurpassed heading, very good clearances on both sides, striking the ball with both feet perfectly and a superb spirit of self-sacrifice hard to imagine, to which is added the attachment to Universitatea for 25 years"

— Dr. Constantin Rădulescu talking about Mircea Luca

Luca was born on 3 August 1921 in Zalău, Kingdom of Romania and began playing football in 1932, at the age of 11, at the junior center of Universitatea Cluj. He made his debut for the senior squad at age 18 under coach Ferenc Nyúl who used him as a winger on 18 November 1939 in the last game of the 1938–39 Divizia B season which was a 6–1 home win over Industria Sârmei Câmpia Turzii. In the first home game of the following season, Luca was also used as a winger by new coach Janos Szaniszló, scoring a brace in a 7–0 victory against Stăruința Oradea Those were his only two goals in his total of five appearances in the season, at the end of which the club finished second and gained promotion to Divizia A.

Luca became "U" Cluj's captain in 1941, in the hardest period of the club's history, as in 1940, the team moved from Cluj-Napoca to Sibiu as a result of the Second Vienna Award, when the northern part of Transylvania was ceded to Hungary. In 1945, after the end of the Second World War and the return of the northern part of Transylvania to Romania, "U" returned to its home in Cluj. During these years some players left to play for Bucharest teams but Luca refused to do so, and the team's biggest performance was reaching the 1942 Cupa României final, in which Luca did not play in the eventual defeat to Rapid București. After the war in which some of the club's players died, the team had to earn its right to play in Cluj, having to defeat Ferar Cluj. During the war, Ferar competed in the Hungarian league under the name Kolozsvár AC, finishing third in one season and had more experienced and international footballers. According to historian Gheorghe Bodea who was at the game, the disparity between the two teams could be seen since the players entered the field as Ferar 's players had new equipment while the players of "U" appeared in equipment that was five years old. Bodea also claims that the game was dominated at first by Ferar but Universitatea resisted with Luca being the leader of the defense. At one moment in the game, Luca's eyebrow was broken during an aerial duel, and teammate Sever Coracu bandaged him so he could continue the match. With Luca handling the defense and Coracu the offense, "U" Cluj won with 4–0, Luca being named "Man of the match. In December 2007 in an interview for the Gazeta Sporturilor newspaper, Luca said:"Only I know how I gathered them for a match with Ferar (...) They had a strong team, as Cluj never had, one like a racing horse. We won that match 4–0, one that I care a lot about and that ended Ferar's hegemony in Transylvania".

In the summer of 1946, the Romanian Football Federation decided that Universitatea Cluj had to play a play-off against Victoria Cluj in order to earn the right to play in the 1946–47 Divizia A season. During the first leg, while the score was 1–1, goalkeeper Nicolae Szoboszlay got injured, so Luca took his place, managing not to concede a goal, as the game ended with a draw. The second leg was won by The Red Caps with 3–1, thus earning their right to play in the first league where they would stay for the following three seasons, being relegated in 1949. During this period the team also reached the 1949 Cupa României final in which coach Iuliu Baratky used Luca the entire match in the eventual 2–1 loss to CSCA București. In the 1950 Divizia B season, Luca played 19 games, helping the club finish in first place and gain back promotion to the first league. In that season, he even played in a 2–1 win over Locomotiva Cluj from the beginning as a goalkeeper because the usual goalkeeper Crăciun got injured two days before the game. In the following six years, the team played in the first league with Luca's style of play being appreciated by the journalists. On 20 November 1955 during an away match against Flacăra Ploiești, goalkeeper Ghibănescu got injured, so Luca went again in the goalpost but this time the game ended with a 4–1 loss. In the 1956 season, the team finished in 12th place, being relegated to Divizia B, the last game of the season being Luca's last game of his career, a 5–2 home loss to Progresul Oradea. He has a total of 176 appearances with one goal scored in Divizia A, and also he is known for playing for at least one game on all the main positions in football: goalkeeper, defender, midfielder and forward.

== Managerial career ==
After retiring from his playing activity, he always remained close to Universitatea Cluj, being president or coach, especially in hard times. Luca first coached "U" in the second half of the 1963–64 Divizia A season, the team finishing in 9th place. He coached the team once more, but just for one round by the end of the 1972–73 Divizia A season, obtaining a draw in the Cluj derby against CFR Cluj.

== Personal life ==
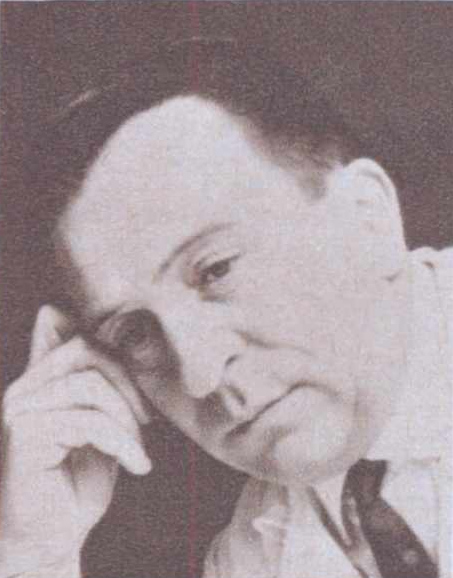
Luca in 1966

He also worked as an ENT surgeon. A book about the history of Universitatea Cluj, written by journalist Ioan Chirilă called Șepcile Roșii (English: The Red Caps), ends with an analysis by Dr. Luca about the club:"Universitatea Cluj won and lost when no one expected. Even its victory in the Cupa României is the result of some calendar coincidences, when the students found the maximum form through the laws of chance. "U" tried several times to be more than it can. It tried to forget what it was. It tried, in the last resort, to stop being "U", sacrificing the lovely black horseshoe on its student chest, in the name of wanting to be what it could never be. Universitatea Cluj will always be just a champion of unsettled enthusiasms. Can there be a more beautiful title?". In 1994, he received the Honorary Citizen of Cluj-Napoca title.

Luca died on 29 July 2008. After his death, historian Gheorghe Bodea said:"I am sorry. With this death, the symbolism of "U" ended. I am very saddened by the loss. Such love as his for the colors of the team has never existed in the history of the team". Remus Câmpeanu who was "U" Cluj's president at that time said:"For me, he was a model, both as a person and as a player. He loved this team, with whom he stayed both through thick and thin. We were proud of him and we will continue to be proud. I would like to have people like him close to the team".

On 1 December 2013, a bronze statue of him was revealed to the public by his nephew, Ovidiu Luca and former "U" Cluj players Nicolae Szoboszlay and Remus Câmpeanu in front of the Cluj Arena stadium, where a marble plaque was also placed before the statue that says: "Dr. Mircea Luca 1921–2008. Fidelity, honor, respect, tradition".

== Honours ==
Universitatea Cluj

- Divizia B: 1950
- Cupa României runner-up: 1941–42, 1948–49
