= Anghel Crețeanu =

Romanian footballer (1910–1987)

Personal information
- Date of birth: 5 April 1910
- Place of birth: Galați, Romania
- Date of death: 7 January 1987 (aged 76)
- Position: Goalkeeper

Senior career*
Years	Team	Apps	(Gls)
1926–1933	DVA Galați		
1933–1937	Juventus București (Note: He made nine appearances in the 1933–34 Divizia A season, not seven as other sources claim.)	49	(1)
1937–1941	Unirea Tricolor București (Note: The statistics for the 1938–39 Divizia B season are unavailable.)	31	(0)
Total		80	(1)

International career
1934–1936	Romania	6	(0)
- * Club domestic league appearances and goals

Anghel Crețeanu (5 April 1910 – 7 January 1987) was a Romanian footballer who played as a goalkeeper.

== Club career ==
Crețeanu was born on 5 April 1910 in Galați, Romania and began playing football at local club DVA in the regional league. In 1933 he joined Juventus București, making his Divizia A debut under coach Ladislau Csillag on 17 September in a 3–1 away win over Ripensia Timișoara. In the following two years he appeared regularly for the team, scoring his career's only goal from a penalty kick on 9 November 1935 in a 2–2 draw against Unirea Tricolor București. After making only three appearances in his final season at Juventus, Crețeanu moved to Unirea Tricolor București. His new team was relegated after his first season spent there, but he stayed with the club, helping it gain promotion back to the first league after one season. The 1940–41 season was Crețeanu's last season of his career, player-coach Ștefan Cârjan using him in two games as Unirea Tricolor won the title. His last Divizia A appearance was on 28 September 1941 in a 2–0 home win over Venus București, totaling 70 matches in the competition. Unirea Tricolor also reached the 1941 Cupa României final, but Cârjan did not use him in the loss to Rapid București.

== International career ==
Crețeanu played six games for Romania, making his debut on 30 December 1934, when coach Alexandru Săvulescu used him as a starter, but replaced him after 15 minutes with Carol Burdan in a 3–2 away victory against Bulgaria in the 1934–35 Balkan Cup. His following three games were in the 1935 Balkan Cup. Crețeanu's last match for the national team was in the friendly King Carol II Cup, a 3–2 win against Yugoslavia, played on 10 May 1936.

== Writing ==
Crețeanu wrote one volume about football, published in 1972 titled "20 de ani în urmărirea balonului rotund" (20 years in pursuit of the round balloon).

== Death ==
Crețeanu died on 7 January 1987 at the age of 76.

== Honours ==
Unirea Tricolor București

- Divizia A: 1940–41
- Divizia B: 1938–39
- Cupa României runner-up: 1940–41
