= 1942 Cupa României final =

- Event: 1941–42 Cupa României
| Rapid București | Universitatea Cluj-Sibiu |
| 7 | 1 |
- Date: 9 August 1942
- Venue: Venus, Bucharest
- Referee: Mihail Petrescu (Bucharest)
- Attendance: 10,000

The 1942 Cupa României final was the 9th final of Romania's most prestigious football cup competition. It was disputed between Universitatea Cluj-Sibiu and Rapid București, and was won by Rapid București after a game with 8 goals. It was the seventh cup for Rapid, and the sixth out of six consecutive successes.

== Match details ==
9 August 1942
17:00 EET

| Rapid București | 7–1 | Universitatea Cluj-Sibiu |
|---|---|---|
| Florian 16'; Gavrilescu 47', 52', 86'; Moldoveanu 53'; Filotti 75', 77' | Report | Medrea III 63' |

Venus, Bucharest
Attendance: 10,000
Referee: Mihail Petrescu (Bucharest)

| GK | 1 | (Romania) Robert Sadowski |
| DF | 2 | (Romania) Remus Ghiurițan |
| DF | 3 | (Romania) Ion Wetzer III |
| MF | 4 | (Romania) Ioan Costea |
| MF | 5 | (Romania) Gheorghe Rășinaru |
| MF | 6 | (Romania) Ioachim Moldoveanu |
| FW | 7 | (Romania) Ion Bogdan |
| FW | 8 | (Romania) Ştefan Filotti |
| FW | 9 | (Romania) Florian Radu |
| FW | 10 | (Romania) Dan Gavrilescu |
| FW | 11 | (Romania) Florea Tănăsescu |
Manager:
(Romania) Iuliu Baratky

| GK | 1 | (Romania) Aurel Boroș |
| DF | 2 | (Romania) Nicolae Bretoteanu |
| DF | 3 | (Romania) Mircea Medrea II |
| MF | 4 | (Romania) Octavian Chirilă |
| MF | 5 | (Romania) Ovidiu Muscă |
| MF | 6 | (Romania) Dumitru Jifcovici |
| FW | 7 | (Romania) Petru Moldoveanu |
| FW | 8 | (Romania) Coriolan Coman |
| FW | 9 | (Romania) Toni Dascălu |
| FW | 10 | (Romania) Olimpiu Medrea III |
| FW | 11 | (Romania) Ţăranu |
Manager:
(Austria) Maertens

== See also ==
- List of Cupa României finals
