= 1936 Cupa României final =

- Event: 1935–36 Cupa României
Ripensia Timișoara	Unirea Tricolor
5	1
- Date: 21 June 1936
- Venue: Venus, Bucharest
- Referee: Constantin Iliescu (Bucharest)
- Attendance: 18,000

The 1936 Cupa României final was the third final of Romania's most prestigious football cup competition. It was disputed between Ripensia Timişoara and Unirea Tricolor București, and was won by Ripensia Timişoara after a game with 6 goals. It was the second cup trophy won by the Timișoara team.

== Match details ==
21 June 1936
18:00 EET

Ripensia Timișoara	5–1	Unirea Tricolor București
Dobay 44'; Schwartz 55', 87'; Ciolac 61', 85'	Report	Niculescu 50' (pen.)

Venus, Bucharest
Attendance: 18,000
Referee: Constantin Iliescu (Bucharest)

GK	1	(Romania) Dumitru Pavlovici
DF	2	(Romania) Rudolf Bürger
DF	3	(Romania) Balázs Hoksary
MF	4	(Romania) Vasile Chiroiu
MF	5	(Romania) Rudolf Kotormany
MF	6	(Romania) Eugen Lakatos
FW	7	(Romania) Silviu Bindea
FW	8	(Romania) Zoltan Beke
FW	9	(Romania) Gheorghe Ciolac
FW	10	(Romania) Alexandru Schwartz
FW	11	(Romania) Ştefan Dobay
Manager:
(Hungary) Jenő Konrád

GK	1	(Romania) Petre Rădulescu
DF	2	(Romania) Petre Sucitulescu
DF	3	(Romania) Ilie Iliescu
MF	4	(Romania) Nicolae Florea
MF	5	(Romania) Petre Steinbach
MF	6	(Romania) Ion Boteanu
FW	7	(Romania) Traian Ionescu
FW	8	(Romania) Dincă Schileru
FW	9	(Romania) Valeriu Sony Niculescu
FW	10	(Romania) Ștefan Cârjan
FW	11	(Romania) Ion Bogdan
Manager:
(Romania) Petre Steinbach

== See also ==
- List of Cupa României finals
