= 1937 Cupa României final =

- Event: 1936–37 Cupa României
Rapid București	Ripensia Timișoara
5	1
- Date: 20 June 1937
- Venue: ONEF, Bucharest
- Referee: Denis Xifando (Bucharest)
- Attendance: 15,000

The 1937 Cupa României final was the fourth final of Romania's most prestigious football cup competition. It was disputed between Ripensia Timişoara and Rapid București, and was won by Rapid București after a game with 6 goals. It was the second cup for Rapid, and the first of six consecutive successes.

== Match details ==
20 June 1937
17:45 EET

Rapid București	5–1	Ripensia Timișoara
Auer 4'; Moldoveanu 69', 75'; Baratky 72', 86'	Report	Dobay 40'

ONEF, Bucharest
Attendance: 15,000
Referee: Denis Xifando (Bucharest)

GK	1	(Romania) Petre Rădulescu
DF	2	(Romania) Ştefan Wetzer II
DF	3	(Romania) Nicolae Roşculeţ
MF	4	(Romania) Vintilă Cossini
MF	5	(Romania) Gheorghe Rășinaru
MF	6	(Romania) Alexandru Cuedan
FW	7	(Romania) Ştefan Auer
FW	8	(Romania) Ioachim Moldoveanu
FW	9	(Romania) Iuliu Baratky
FW	10	(Romania) Ştefan Barbu II
FW	11	(Romania) Ion Bogdan
Manager:
(Austria) Edi Bauer

GK	1	(Romania) Dumitru Pavlovici
DF	2	(Romania) Rudolf Bürger
DF	3	(Romania) Francisc Agner
MF	4	(Romania) Cornel Lazăr
MF	5	(Romania) Rudolf Kotormany
MF	6	(Romania) Vasile Deheleanu
FW	7	(Romania) Silviu Bindea
FW	8	(Romania) Ioan Oprean
FW	9	(Romania) Gheorghe Ciolac
FW	10	(Romania) Alexandru Schwartz
FW	11	(Romania) Ştefan Dobay
Manager:
(Austria) Karl Heinlein

== See also ==
- List of Cupa României finals
