= Sever Coracu =

Romanian footballer

Personal information
- Date of birth: 2 October 1920
- Place of birth: Kovin, Kingdom of SCS
- Date of death: 1993 (aged 72–73)
- Place of death: Cluj-Napoca, Socialist Republic of Romania
- Position: Striker

Youth career
- 1934–1937: Progresul Timișoara

Senior career*
Years	Team	Apps	(Gls)
1937–1938	Ripensia Timișoara		
1938–1949	Universitatea Cluj (Note: The Divizia A 1940–41 was the last season before World War II and the Divizia A 1946–47 was the first one after, so the appearances during this period for Universitatea Cluj are not official.)	88	(43)
1950–1952	Locomotiva Cluj		
Total		88	(43)

International career
1940–1946	Romania	2	(0)
- * Club domestic league appearances and goals

Sever Coracu (2 October 1920 – 1993) was a Romanian football striker and a sprinter. He was national champion at 200 metres sprint in 1939.

== Club career ==
"Left winger, unique for his speed, international football player, athletic, with a perfect strike of the ball with both feet, finisher par excellence if he was well valued, exceptional counter-attacking player"

— Dr. Constantin Rădulescu talking about Sever Coracu

Coracu was born on 2 October 1920 in Kovin, Kingdom of SCS, and began playing junior-level football in 1934 in Timișoara, Romania at local club Progresul, a few years later moving to Ripensia. In 1938 he went to play for Universitatea Cluj, first at the junior team. He scored his first goal for the senior side in a 7–0 win over Olimpia Satu Mare in the 1939–40 Divizia B season. The team finished that season in second place, playing a play-off for promotion to Divizia A against Victoria Cluj in which he scored two goals in the 5–1 victory. Subsequently, he made his first league debut under coach Iosif Kovács in a 2–1 home loss to Sportul Studențesc București.

Coracu stayed with "U" Cluj in the hardest period of the club's history, because in 1940, the team moved from Cluj-Napoca to Sibiu as a result of the Second Vienna Award, when the northern part of Transylvania was ceded to Hungary. In 1945, after the end of the Second World War and the return of the northern part of Transylvania to Romania, "U" returned to its home in Cluj. During these years the team's biggest performance was reaching the 1942 Cupa României final, where Coracu did not play in the eventual defeat to Rapid București. Also in the 1940–41 Divizia A season he scored a brace in a 3–2 home loss to eventual champions, Unirea Tricolor București, one of them being directly from a corner kick. In the 1941–42 unofficial Cupa Basarabia he scored six goals in a 17–0 home win over CFR Sibiu. After the war in which some of the club's players died, the team had to earn its right to play in Cluj, having to defeat Ferar Cluj. During the war, Ferar competed in the Hungarian league under the name Kolozsvár AC, finishing third in one season and had more experienced and international footballers. According to historian Gheorghe Bodea who was at the game, the disparity between the two teams could be seen since the players entered the field as Ferar 's players had new equipment while the players of "U" appeared in equipment that was five years old. Bodea also claims that the game was dominated at first by Ferar but Universitatea resisted with captain Mircea Luca being the leader of the defense. At one moment in the game, Luca's eyebrow was broken during an aerial duel, and Coracu bandaged him so he could continue the match. With Luca handling the defense and Coracu the offense, "U" Cluj won with 4–0.

In the summer of 1946, the Romanian Football Federation decided that Universitatea Cluj had to play a play-off against Victoria Cluj in order to earn the right to play in the 1946–47 Divizia A season. In the first leg, the score was a 1–1 draw, but in the second The Red Caps won with 3–1, one of their goals being scored by Coracu. The team reached the 1949 Cupa României final in which Coracu did not play in the 2–1 loss to CSCA București. In 1950 he went to play for Divizia B side Locomotiva Cluj where he stayed until he retired in 1952. Coracu was a player known for scoring many goals from corner kicks and for his speed which made him national champion at 200 metres sprint in 1939.

== International career ==
Coracu made his debut for Romania on 22 September 1940 under coach Liviu Iuga in a 2–1 away victory against Yugoslavia. He also appeared in a 1–0 loss to Albania in the 1946 Balkan Cup.

== Death ==
Coracu died in 1993 in Cluj-Napoca.

== Honours ==
Universitatea Cluj

- Cupa României runner-up: 1941–42, 1948–49
