= Robert Sadowski =

Romanian footballer (1914–2000)

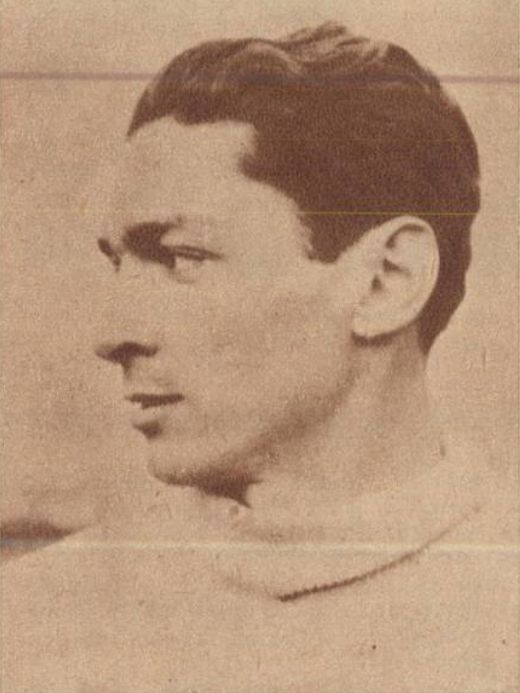

Personal information
- Date of birth: 16 August 1914
- Place of birth: Cernăuți, Austria-Hungary
- Date of death: 2000
- Position: Goalkeeper

Youth career
- Muncitorul Cernăuți

Senior career*
Years	Team	Apps	(Gls)
1935–1938	AMEF Arad	58	(0)
1938–1940	Juventus București	38	(0)
1940–1947	Rapid București (Note: The Divizia A 1940–41 was the last season before World War II and the Divizia A 1946–47 was the first one after, so the appearances and goals scored during this period for Rapid București are not official with the exception of the 1945–46 regional championship.)	52	(0)
1947–1948	Ciocanul București	25	(0)
1950–1951	AS Monaco	29	(0)
Total		202	(0)

International career
1937–1948	Romania	5	(0)
Ice hockey career
- Position: Right wing
- Played for: HC Bragadiru București; Dragoș Vodă Cernăuți; Rapid București; Juventus București; HC Ciocanul București
- National team: Romania
- Playing career: 1935–1947
- * Club domestic league appearances and goals

Robert Sadowski (16 August 1914 – 2000) was a Romanian football goalkeeper, who earned five caps for Romania, and participated in the 1938 World Cup. He also played ice hockey, representing the national team in three World Championships.

== Football career ==
=== Club career ===
Sadowski, nicknamed by the press "Frumosul Robert" (Handsome Robert), was born on 16 August 1914 in Cernăuți, Austria-Hungary and began playing football as a goalkeeper at local club Muncitorul. In 1935 he went to play for AMEF Arad, making his Divizia A debut on 29 September in a 2–2 draw against Gloria Arad. After appearing regularly for AMEF three seasons, during which the team finished twice in second place, he joined Juventus București. Sadowski spent two years with Juventus, then he signed for neighboring club Rapid. There, he won the 1939–40 Cupa României, with coach Ștefan Auer using him the entire match in the 2–1 victory in the fourth game of the final against Venus București, as the previous three in which he did not play were draws. In the following season he helped the club earn a second place in the league and win another Cupa României, being used the full 90 minutes by coach Iuliu Baratky in the 4–3 victory against Unirea Tricolor București in the final. In the 1941–42 season, Sadowski helped The Railwaymen win the third consecutive Cupa României, being again used by Baratky the whole match in the final, a 7–1 win over Universitatea Cluj-Sibiu. In 1947 he left Rapid after Valentin Stănescu was brought as goalkeeper, initially going to play for Divizia B team, Astra Română Poiana Câmpina, but eventually he stayed in Divizia A for one more season at Ciocanul București. He made his last appearance in the league on 5 May 1948 in Ciocanul's 2–1 away victory against Jiul Petroșani, totaling 161 matches in the competition. Subsequently, Sadowski ended his career by playing two seasons abroad in the French Division 2 for AS Monaco.

=== International career ===
Sadowski played five games for Romania, making his debut on 6 September 1937 under coach Constantin Rădulescu in a 2–1 away loss to Yugoslavia in the King Carol II friendly tournament. He was selected by coaches Săvulescu and Rădulescu to be part of the squad that participated in the 1938 World Cup. His teammate Dumitru Pavlovici played in the first game against Cuba which ended in a 3–3 draw, but Sadowski played in the replay that ended with a surprising 2–1 loss. In the following years, he played in a 3–2 victory against Slovakia and a draw against Poland in which he kept a clean sheet, both of which were friendlies. His last appearance took place on 2 May 1948 in a 1–0 home loss to Albania in the 1948 Balkan Cup.

== Ice hockey career ==
=== Club career ===
Sadowski started playing ice hockey in 1935 at HC Bragadiru București, playing as a right winger, alongside Constantin Cantacuzino and Andrei Bărbulescu, winning the Romanian Hockey League in his first season. He then went to play for a few years for his hometown team, Dragoș Vodă Cernăuți, with whom he won another Romanian league title. Afterwards, Sadowski joined for one season Rapid București where he was teammates with Mihai Flamaropol, helping the club win the 1940 title. In 1940 he went alongside Flamaropol to play for Juventus București for six seasons, winning four titles. He ended his career in 1947 after one year spent at HC Ciocanul București.

=== International career ===
Sadowski represented Romania's national team in three World Championships. First he played one game during the 1937 edition when the team finished in 10th place. He appeared in three games in the following World Championships when Romania finished in 13th place. During the 1947 edition, Sadowski made a personal record of six appearances in a final tournament, as the team finished in 7th place.

== Death ==
Sadowski died in 2000 at age 86.

== Honours ==
=== Footballer ===
Rapid București

- Cupa României: 1939–40, 1940–41, 1941–42

=== Ice hockey player ===
HC Bragadiru București

- Romanian Hockey League: 1936

Dragoș Vodă Cernăuți

- Romanian Hockey League: 1938

Rapid București

- Romanian Hockey League: 1940

Juventus București

- Romanian Hockey League: 1941, 1942, 1945, 1946
