= Florian Radu =

Romanian footballer

Personal information
- Date of birth: 8 April 1920
- Place of birth: Bucharest, Romania
- Date of death: 10 November 1991 (aged 71)
- Height: 1.83 m (6 ft 0 in)
- Position: Forward

Senior career*
Years	Team	Apps	(Gls)
1938–1939	Metaloglobus București		
1939–1947	Rapid București (Note: The Divizia A 1940–41 was the last season before World War II and the Divizia A 1946–47 was the first one after, so the appearances and goals scored during this period for Rapid București are not official with the exception of the 1945–46 regional championship.)	47	(13)
1948	Szentlőrinci	10	(2)
1948–1949	AS Roma	5	(2)
1949–1950	Cosenza	19	(5)
1950–1951	Marsala	26	(5)
Total		107	(27)

International career
1942	Romania	1	(1)

Managerial career
- 1956–1957: Stade Athletique Spinalien
- * Club domestic league appearances and goals

Florian Radu (8 April 1920 – 10 November 1991) was a Romanian footballer who played as a forward and coach.

He won three consecutive Cupa României with his hometown club Rapid București. When the communists took over Romania, Radu moved abroad, first in Hungary at Szentlőrinci, then in Italy at AS Roma, Cosenza and Marsala. Radu has earned only one cap for Romania in a 2–2 draw against Croatia, during which he also scored. He served as head coach for Stade Athletique Spinalien in France.

== Club career ==
Radu was born on 8 April 1920 in Bucharest, Romania and began playing football at local club Metaloglobus in the Romanian lower leagues. In 1939 he joined Rapid București, making his Divizia A debut on 15 October in a 3–2 home win over Ripensia Timișoara. At the end of the season, Radu won his first trophy, the 1939–40 Cupa României, coach Ștefan Auer using him in one of the four games against Venus București in the final. In the following two seasons he would win two more Cupa României under coach Iuliu Baratky, opening the scoring in each of the finals, a 4–3 victory against Unirea Tricolor București in the one in 1941 and a 7–1 win over Universitatea Cluj in the 1942 final. On 8 June 1947, Radu made his last Divizia A appearance, scoring a brace in a 10–1 victory against FC Craiova, totaling 39 games with eight goals in the competition.

In 1948, as Romania was becoming communist, he moved to Hungary at Szentlőrinci. Radu made his Nemzeti Bajnokság I debut on 15 February under coach János Nagy in a 3–2 home loss to Csepel. In the following round, he scored his first goal in a 10–3 away loss to Újpest. Then, on 5 June, he scored the only goal in a victory against MTK Budapest.

Afterwards he went to Italy, having offers from Lazio Roma and Novara, but eventually signed with AS Roma which was desperately looking for a forward after failing to sign László Kubala. Radu made his Serie A debut on 13 February 1949 under coach Luigi Brunella, who used him the entire match in a 0–0 draw against Bari. He scored his first goal on 30 April in a 2–1 loss to Novara. Subsequently, on 8 May he opened the score from a penalty in a 3–1 victory against Pro Patria which helped the club earn important points to avoid relegation.

Radu spent the last two years of his career in Serie C at Cosenza and Marsala, retiring in 1951.

== International career ==
Radu played one friendly game for Romania on 11 October 1942 when coach Ion Lăpușneanu used him the entire match in a 2–2 draw against Croatia in which he scored one goal.

=== International goals ===
Scores and results list Romania's goal tally first, score column indicates score after each Radu goal.

List of international goals scored by Florian Radu
#	Date	Venue	Cap	Opponent	Score	Result	Competition
1	11 October 1942	Stadionul ANEF, Bucharest, Romania	1	Croatia	1–2	2–2	Friendly match

== Managerial career ==
He coached French side Stade Athletique Spinalien from 1956 to 1957.

== Death ==
Radu died on 10 November 1991 at the age of 71.

== Honours ==
Rapid București

- Cupa României: 1939–40, 1940–41, 1941–42
