= Tudor Paraschiva =

Romanian footballer

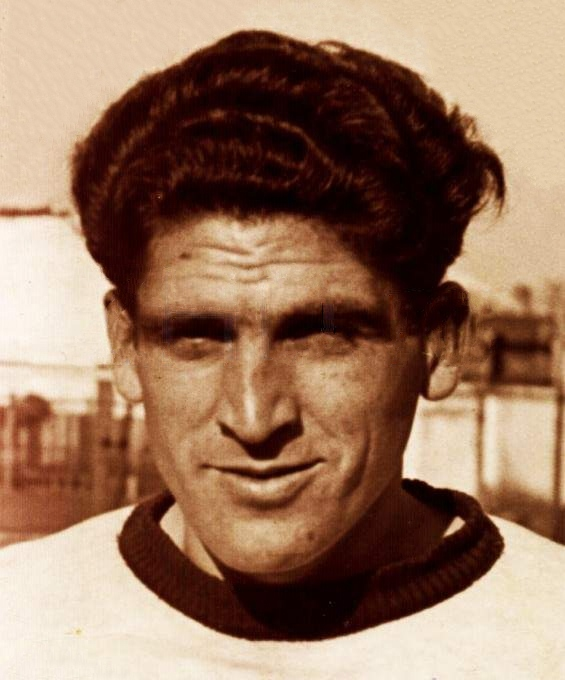

Personal information
- Date of birth: 27 December 1919
- Place of birth: Bucharest, Romania
- Date of death: 15 May 1967 (aged 47)
- Place of death: Sinaia, Romania
- Position: Striker

Youth career
- 1934: Renașterea București
- 1934–1939: Militari București

Senior career*
Years	Team	Apps	(Gls)
1939–1946	Unirea Tricolor București (Note: The 1940–41 Divizia A was the last season before World War II and the 1946–47 Divizia A was the first one after, so the appearances during this period for Unirea Tricolor București are not official with the exception of the 1945–46 regional championship.)	28	(4)
1946–1957	Jiul Petroșani (Note: The 1957 championship called Cupa Primăverii is unofficial, so the appearances and goals scored at that competition for Jiul Petroșani are not official.)	208	(66)
1957–1959	Minerul Lupeni (Note: The statistics for the 1957–58 and 1958–59 Divizia B seasons are unavailable.)	10	(1)
Total		246	(71)

International career
1952–1954	Romania	6	(2)

Managerial career
- 1959–1962: Minerul Vulcan
- 1962–1967: Pandurii Târgu Jiu
- * Club domestic league appearances and goals

Tudor Paraschiva (27 December 1919 – 15 May 1967) was a Romanian association football striker.

== Club career ==
Paraschiva was born on 27 December 1919 in Bucharest, Romania and began playing junior-level football in 1934 at local club Renșterea before moving shortly afterwards to CS Militari. He made his Divizia A debut on 16 September 1939, playing for Unirea Tricolor București in a 3–2 loss to Rapid București. Under the guidance of player-coach Ștefan Cârjan he helped Unirea Tricolor win the Divizia A title in the 1940–41 season, contributing with two goals scored in seven matches. In the same season he helped the club reach the 1941 Cupa României final in which he played the entire match in the 4–3 loss to Rapid. In 1946, Paraschiva joined Jiul Petroșani, a club where he spent 10 seasons. In the 1947–48 season he scored a personal record of 15 goals, then in the following one he netted 14 goals which helped the team finish third. He then went to play for Minerul Lupeni in Divizia B, helping them get promoted to Divizia A in his second season. On 15 November 1959, Paraschiva made his last Divizia A appearance in a 7–0 away loss to Progresul București, totaling 238 matches with 71 goals in the competition.

== International career ==
Paraschiva played six games and scored two goals for Romania, making his debut on 11 May 1952 under coach Emerich Vogl in a 3–1 friendly victory against Czechoslovakia in which he opened the score. His following appearance for the national team was also in a friendly, a 1–0 victory against Poland in which he scored the goal. His third game played for The Tricolours was in the 1952 Summer Olympics, as coach Gheorghe Popescu used him in a 2–1 loss against eventual champions Hungary. In that match he made a good impression, being selected by the Finnish authorities who organized the competition, to appear in a commemorative postage stamp. Paraschiva's last three games for the national team were a 3–1 friendly win over East Germany, a 2–0 loss to Czechoslovakia during the 1954 World Cup qualifiers and a 5–1 loss against Hungary in a friendly.

== Managerial career ==
After he ended his playing career, Paraschiva started coaching in 1959 at Minerul Vulcan. In 1962, he became the first coach of the newly founded club, Pandurii Târgu Jiu. In his first season, he managed to promote them to Divizia C, where he led the team until his death in 1967.

== Career statitics ==
Appearances and goals by national team and year
National team	Year	Apps	Goals
Romania	1952	4	2
Romania	1953	1	0
Romania	1954	1	0
Total		6	2

=== International goals ===
Scores and results list Romania's goal tally first, score column indicates score after each Paraschiva goal.

Goal	Date	Venue	Opponent	Score	Result	Competition
1	11 May 1952	Stadionul Republicii, București, Romania	Czechoslovakia	1–0	3–1	Friendly
2	25 May 1952	Stadionul Republicii, București, Romania	Poland	1–0	1–0	Friendly

== Death ==
Paraschiva died on 15 May 1967 at age 47.

== Honours ==
=== Player ===
Unirea Tricolor București

- Divizia A: 1940–41
- Cupa României runner-up: 1940–41

Minerul Lupeni

- Divizia B: 1958–59

=== Manager ===
Pandurii Târgu Jiu

- County championship: 1962–63
