= 1938 Cupa României final =

- Event: 1937–38 Cupa României
Rapid București	CAM Timișoara
3	2
- Date: 19 June 1938
- Venue: Giulești, Bucharest
- Referee: Denis Xifando (Bucharest)
- Attendance: 7,000

The 1938 Cupa României final was the fifth final of Romania's most prestigious football cup competition. It was disputed between CAM Timișoara and Rapid București, and was won by Rapid București after a game with 5 goals. It was the third cup for Rapid, and the second of six consecutive successes.

CAM Timișoara was the first club representing Divizia B which reached the Romanian Cup final.

== Match details ==
19 June 1938
17:30 EET

Rapid București	3–2	CAM Timișoara
Auer 9'; Cuedan 39'; Raffinski 80' (pen.)	Report	Gerber 8'; Reuter 70'

Giulești, Bucharest
Attendance: 7,000
Referee: Denis Xifando (Bucharest)

GK	1	(Romania) Ioan Negru
DF	2	(Romania) Ştefan Wetzer II
DF	3	(Romania) Nicolae Roşculeţ
MF	4	(Romania) Vintilă Cossini
MF	5	(Romania) Gheorghe Rășinaru
MF	6	(Romania) Ladislau Raffinsky
FW	7	(Romania) Ion Bogdan
FW	8	(Romania) Ioachim Moldoveanu
FW	9	(Romania) Ştefan Auer
FW	10	(Romania) Iosif Lengheriu
FW	11	(Romania) Alexandru Cuedan
Manager:
(Austria) Edi Bauer

GK	1	(Romania) Nicolae Eichler
DF	2	(Romania) Ioan Gerber
DF	3	(Romania) Carol Galgocz
MF	4	(Romania) Coloman Farago
MF	5	(Romania) Emanuel Kohn
MF	6	(Romania) Iosif Janossy
FW	7	(Romania) Petru Bucher
FW	8	(Romania) Robert Toth-Bedö
FW	9	(Romania) Nicolae Reuter
FW	10	(Romania) Mihai Zsizsik
FW	11	(Romania) Nicolae Perszem

== See also ==
- List of Cupa României finals
