= 1939 Cupa României final =

- Event: 1938–39 Cupa României
Rapid București	Sportul Studențesc
2	0
- Date: 9 July 1939
- Venue: Venus, Bucharest
- Referee: Emil Kroner (Bucharest)
- Attendance: 12,000

The 1939 Cupa României final was the sixth final of Romania's most prestigious football cup competition. It was disputed between Sportul Studențesc București and Rapid București, and was won by Rapid București after a game with 2 goals. It was the fourth cup for Rapid, and the third of six consecutive successes.

== Match details ==
9 July 1939
17:45 EET

Rapid București	2–0	Sportul Studențesc București
Baratky 29', 70'	Report

Venus, Bucharest
Attendance: 12,000
Referee: Emil Kroner (Bucharest)

GK	1	(Romania) Petre Rădulescu
DF	2	(Romania) Iosif Lengheriu
DF	3	(Romania) Zoltan Marton
MF	4	(Romania) Vintilă Cossini
MF	5	(Romania) Gheorghe Rășinaru
MF	6	(Romania) Ion Costea
FW	7	(Hungary) Vilmos Sipos
FW	8	(Romania) Ştefan Auer
FW	9	(Romania) Iuliu Baratky
FW	10	(Romania) Dan Gavrilescu
FW	11	(Romania) Ion Bogdan
Manager:
(Romania) Ştefan Auer

GK	1	(Romania) Mircea Constantinescu
DF	2	(Romania) Duce Coe
DF	3	(Romania) Mircea Bădulescu
MF	4	(Romania) Tache Dumitrescu
MF	5	(Romania) Alexandru Drăgan
MF	6	(Romania) Gheorghe Constantinescu Grecu
FW	7	(Romania) Angheloiu
FW	8	(Romania) Ion Mihăilescu
FW	9	(Romania) Teodor Remus
FW	10	(Romania) Traian Ştefănescu
FW	11	(Romania) Gheorghe Popescu I
Manager:
(Romania) Jenö Dobó

== See also ==
- List of Cupa României finals
