= 1943 Cupa României final =

- Event: 1942–43 Cupa României
CFR Turnu Severin	Sportul Studențesc
4	0
- Date: 15 August 1943
- Venue: ONEF, Bucharest
- Referee: Emil Kroner (Bucharest)
- Attendance: 9,000

The 1943 Cupa României final was the 10th final of Romania's most prestigious football cup competition. It was played between CFR Turnu Severin and Sportul Studențesc București, and was won by CFR Turnu Severin after a 4 goal shutout. It was the first time in history for the team from Drobeta-Turnu Severin.

== Match details ==
15 August 1943
17:00 EET

CFR Turnu Severin	4–0	Sportul Studențesc București
Ludwig 32', 83'; Reuter 34', 58'	Report

ONEF, Bucharest
Attendance: 9,000
Referee: Emil Kroner (Bucharest)

GK	1	(Romania) Dumitru Pavlovici
DF	2	(Romania) Ioan Oprean
DF	3	(Romania) Vasile Felecan III
MF	4	(Romania) Mureşan
MF	5	(Romania) Pârjol
MF	6	(Romania) Rusalin Marcu
FW	7	(Romania) Vidan
FW	8	(Romania) Iosif Cosma
FW	9	(Romania) Ludwig
FW	10	(Romania) Teodor Felecan II
FW	11	(Romania) Nicolae Reuter
Manager:

GK	1	(Romania) Valentin Stănescu
DF	2	(Romania) Gheorghe Teodorescu
DF	3	(Romania) Nicu Virgil
MF	4	(Romania) Gheorghe Constantinescu Grecu
MF	5	(Romania) Alexandru Drăgan
MF	6	(Romania) Gheorghe Popa
FW	7	(Romania) Alexandru Pricop
FW	8	(Romania) Titi Dumitrescu
FW	9	(Romania) Gheorghe Popescu I
FW	10	(Romania) Constantin Rădulescu
FW	11	(Romania) Nicolae Dumitrescu III
Manager:

== See also ==
- List of Cupa României finals
