= Constantin Rădulescu =

Constantin Rădulescu may refer to:

- Constantin Rădulescu-Motru ("Motru", 1868–1957), Romanian academic and politician
- Constantin Rădulescu (footballer, born 1896) ("Costel", 1896–1981), Romanian goalkeeper, football manager and bobsledder
- Constantin Rădulescu (footballer, born 1924) ("Jumate", 1924–2001), Romanian midfielder and football manager
- Constantin Rădulescu (footballer, born 1934) ("Costică", 1934–2002), Romanian midfielder and football manager
