= Remus Ghiurițan =

Romanian footballer (born 1919)

Personal information
- Date of birth: 7 September 1919
- Place of birth: Zalău, Romania
- Position: Defender

Youth career
- 1935–1939: Șoimii Sibiu

Senior career*
Years	Team	Apps	(Gls)
1939–1940	CFR Cluj		
1940	CFR Timișoara		
1941–1943	Rapid București (Note: The Divizia A 1940–41 was the last season before World War II and the Divizia A 1946–47 was the first one after, so the appearances and goals scored during this period for Rapid București are not official.)	2	(0)
1944	Juventus București		
1945–1948	CFR București (Note: The Divizia A 1940–41 was the last season before World War II and the Divizia A 1946–47 was the first one after, so the appearances and goals scored during this period for CFR București are not official with the exception of the 1945–46 regional championship.)	39	(0)
1948–1949	Grivița CFR București		
Total		41	(0)

International career
1945	Romania	1	(0)

Managerial career
- 1953–1954: Locomotiva București
- 1959–1960: Rapid București
- * Club domestic league appearances and goals

Remus Ghiurițan (born 7 September 1919, date of death unknown) was a Romanian football defender and manager.

== International career ==
Remus Ghiurițan played one game at international level for Romania in a friendly which ended with a 7–2 loss against Hungary.

== Honours ==
Rapid București

- Cupa României: 1940–41, 1941–42
