= Iuliu Baratky =

Footballer (1910–1962)

Iuliu Baratky / Gyula Barátky
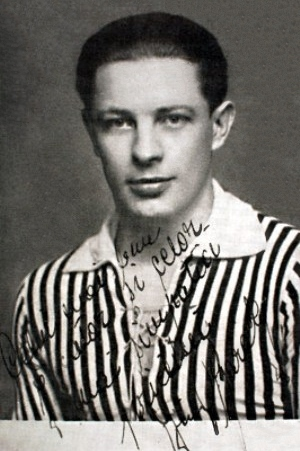
- Baratky in the 1930s

Personal information
- Date of birth: 18 October 1910
- Place of birth: Nagyvárad, Austria-Hungary (today Oradea, Romania)
- Date of death: 14 April 1962 (aged 51)
- Place of death: Bucharest, Romania
- Height: 1.78 m (5 ft 10 in)
- Position: Striker

Youth career
- 1922–1926: Stăruința Oradea

Senior career*
| Years | Team | Apps | (Gls) |
| 1926–1928 | Stăruința Oradea | | |
| 1928 | CA Oradea | | |
| 1928–1933 | MTK Hungária | 82 | (50) |
| 1933–1936 | Crișana Oradea | 51 | (30) |
| 1936–1944 | Rapid București (Note: The 1940–41 Divizia A was the last season before World War II and the 1946–47 Divizia A was the first one after, so the appearances during this period for Rapid București are not official.) | 86 | (61) |
| 1944 | Carmen București (Note: The 1940–41 Divizia A was the last season before World War II and the 1946–47 Divizia A was the first one after, so the appearances during this period for Carmen București are not official.) | 0 | (0) |
| 1944–1945 | Rapid București | 0 | (0) |
| 1946–1947 | Libertatea Oradea | 18 | (10) |
| 1947–1948 | RATA Târgu Mureș | 2 | (0) |
| Total | | 239 | (151) |

International career
| 1930–1933 | Hungary | 9 | (0) |
| 1933–1940 | Romania | 20 | (13) |

Managerial career
- 1941–1944: Rapid București (player-coach)
- 1946–1947: Libertatea Oradea (player-coach)
- 1947–1949: RATA Târgu Mureș (player-coach)
- 1948: Romania
- 1949–1951: Universitatea Cluj
- 1951–1953: Dinamo București
- 1954: Progresul Oradea
- 1957–1959: Dinamo București
- 1959–1962: Dinamo București (youth coach)
- * Club domestic league appearances and goals

Iuliu Baratky (Hungarian: Gyula Barátky; 18 October 1910 – 14 April 1962) was a footballer who played as a striker. He won multiple trophies with MTK Hungária and Rapid București. He also represented both Hungary and Romania internationally. Upon concluding his playing career, he transitioned into coaching, leading several teams as well as the Romanian national side.

== Early life ==
Baratky, nicknamed Minunea blondă ("The Blonde Wonder"), was born on 18 October 1910 in Nagyvárad, Austria-Hungary (today Oradea, Romania). His father was a butcher who owned a chain of shops in Oradea. Barátky finished his formal education at the gymnasium level. At his father's request, he then left school to train as a merchant in the family business. However, he never pursued that path, choosing a career in football instead.

== Club career ==
=== Stăruința Oradea and CA Oradea ===
Baratky began playing junior-level football at Stăruința Oradea. He started to play for the club's senior team in 1926 at age 16. In 1928, he joined CA Oradea, which paid a 35,000 Romanian lei fee to Stăruința. He spent only a few months there, as MTK Hungária made an offer to transfer Baratky. CA Oradea received 75,000 Romanian lei for the transfer, a sum that MTK also gave Baratky to convince him to sign the contract.

=== MTK Hungária ===
Baratky made his Nemzeti Bajnokság I debut for MTK under coach Béla Révész on 21 October 1928 in a 3–2 home win over Sabaria. Six days later, he scored for the first time in the competition by netting the winning goal in a 2–1 victory against Kispest AC. By the end of the 1928–29 season, Baratky helped MTK win the championship by scoring five goals in six league appearances, including a brace in a 9–2 success over Somogy.

During the 1930–31 season, he netted a career-best 19 goals in 19 games, among which were three hat-tricks in wins against Pécs-Baranya, Budai 33 and Vasas. Afterwards, Baratky played in both legs, scoring once in the 6–4 aggregate loss to Wiener AC in the 1931 Mitropa Cup quarter-finals. He helped the club win the 1931–32 Magyar Kupa under coach Imre Senkey, playing in both legs of the final and netting once in the 5–4 aggregate win over Ferencváros. Baratky made his last Nemzeti Bajnokság I appearance on 25 May 1933 in MTK's 4–1 victory against Soroksár, totaling 82 matches with 50 goals in the competition. His last two matches for the club were in the 5–3 aggregate loss to Sparta Prague in 1933 Mitropa Cup quarter-finals.

=== Crișana Oradea ===
In 1933, Baratky returned to Romania by joining Crișana Oradea, which paid 210,000 Romanian lei to MTK Hungária for the transfer. He made his Divizia A debut on 10 September 1933 in a 1–0 away victory against Venus București. During his three-season spell with Crișana, he scored 10 goals in each season.

In the summer of 1936, Baratky received transfer offers from French top-tier clubs Racing Club de France and Lille, but the Romanian Football Federation did not allow him to leave Romania. Eventually, he joined Rapid București, which agreed to pay a transfer fee of 450,000 Romanian lei to Crișana and also paid for Baratky's knee surgery.

=== Rapid București and Carmen București ===
Baratky made his league debut for Rapid under coach Kálmán Konrád on 7 March 1937 and managed to score a hat-trick in a 5–0 win over Universitatea Cluj. He also netted 11 goals in the 1936–37 Cupa României triumph, including a brace in the 5–1 victory against Ripensia Timișoara in the final. In May 1938, he was arrested, together with three other Rapid teammates, László Raffinsky, Ștefan Auer and Vintilă Cossini, because of their 2–1 win in the 1937–38 Cupa României semi-finals against Venus București. The arrest was at the order of Gabriel Marinescu, the Minister of Internal Affairs and the Prefect of București, who was also the chairman of Venus. After one day spent in jail and following the decision that the semi-final be replayed, the four players were released. Rapid also won the replay 4–2 against Venus with a double netted by Baratky. In the final, the team defeated CAM Timișoara, but without Baratky playing.

Baratky played two matches in the 1938 Mitropa Cup as Rapid advanced past Újpest in the opening round, before exiting in the quarter-finals against Genoa, against whom he managed to score a goal. Afterwards, he helped the team secure the 1938–39 Cupa României trophy by scoring a brace in the 2–0 success against Sportul Studențesc București in the final. Rapid reached the 1940 Cupa României final, a four-game series in which Baratky played and scored a total of five goals across all matches to help his side defeat Venus. He also appeared in five games during the 1940 Mitropa Cup campaign, scoring once in the quarter-final win over his former club MTK Hungária. The Railwaymen reached the final of the competition where they were about to play Ferencváros before it was cancelled due to the events of World War II. Baratky then scored a goal in the 1941 Cupa României final to help the team win the trophy following a 4–3 victory against Unirea Tricolor București.

From 1941 onwards, Baratky became Rapid's head coach, while he was still an active player. From this position, in the 1941–42 season, Baratky helped the club win the unofficial competition Cupa Basarabiei and the Cupa României, but he did not play in the latter tournament's final. In 1944, he had a brief stint at Carmen București before returning to Rapid.

=== Libertatea Oradea and RATA Târgu Mureș ===
From 1946 to 1948, Baratky served as player-coach for one season each at Libertatea Oradea and RATA Târgu Mureș. At Libertatea, he formed an impressive offensive partnership with Francisc Spielmann that helped the team finish the 1946–47 season in eighth place. During his stint with RATA, Baratky made his final Divizia A appearance on 29 April 1948 in a 5–3 away loss to Oțelul Reșița, finishing his career in the competition with a total of 155 matches and 101 goals.

== International career ==
=== Hungary ===
Baratky played nine matches for Hungary, making his debut on 28 September 1930 under coach Frigyes Minder in a 5–3 friendly loss to Germany. Subsequently, he played in a 0–0 draw against rivals Austria in the 1931–32 Central European International Cup. His last appearance for Hungary took place on 2 July 1933 in a 5–2 loss to Sweden.

=== Romania ===
In 1933, Baratky switched allegiance from Hungary to Romania. He made his debut for the Romanians on 29 October under coach Constantin Rădulescu in a 2–2 draw against Switzerland during the successful 1934 World Cup qualifiers. Afterwards, he was selected by coaches Rădulescu and Josef Uridil to be part of the squad that went to the final tournament in Italy, but he did not play in the 2–1 defeat to eventual finalists Czechoslovakia in the first round. In the summer of 1937, Baratky scored three consecutive doubles in three friendlies, which were a 2–1 win over Belgium, followed by a 2–2 draw against Sweden, and then a 4–2 away victory over Poland. He was selected by coaches Alexandru Săvulescu and Rădulescu to be part of the squad that participated in the 1938 World Cup. Baratky played in both games against Cuba, the first one being a 3–3 draw in which he scored once, followed by a surprising 2–1 loss in the replay. On 14 July 1940, in a 9–3 friendly loss to Germany where he scored a brace, Baratky made his final appearance for Romania and captained the national side for the first time. He amassed a total of 20 matches with 13 goals for Romania.

== Managerial career ==
=== Player-coach period ===
In 1941, Baratky became Rapid București's player-coach. From this position, in the 1941–42 season, Baratky helped the club win the unofficial competition Cupa Basarabiei and the Cupa României by defeating 7–1 Universitatea Cluj in the final. During the 1946–47 season, he was player-coach of Divizia A club Libertatea Oradea, and in the following season he worked in the same dual-role capacity at RATA Târgu Mureș. For the 1948–49 season, Baratky continued his work at RATA but only as a coach.

=== Romania ===
Baratky coached Romania's national team for four games during the 1948 Balkan Cup. His first match took place on 20 June, and he guided his side to a 3–2 victory against Bulgaria. His following three matches were a win over Czechoslovakia, a draw against Poland, and a loss to Hungary.

=== Universitatea Cluj and Dinamo București ===
In 1949, Baratky went to coach Universitatea Cluj, helping them reach the 1949 Cupa României final where they were defeated 2–1 by CSCA București. Subsequently, he led the club to achieve promotion from Divizia B to the first league in the 1950 season. Midway through the 1951 season, Baratky left "U" and joined Dinamo București. On 1 October 1951, he guided Dinamo to a spectacular 6–2 win over rivals CCA București. In the middle of the 1953 season, Baratky was replaced by Angelo Niculescu as Dinamo's coach.

=== Progresul Oradea and Dinamo București ===
In the 1954 season, Baratky managed Progresul Oradea for a significant period. Afterwards, he returned for a second tenure at Dinamo in 1957. During this spell, he helped the club win its first Cupa României by defeating CSM Baia Mare 4–0 in the 1959 final. In October 1959, Baratky was replaced by Traian Ionescu as the head coach of Dinamo, but he continued to work at the club's youth center until his death in 1962.

== Style of play ==
Angelo Niculescu described Baratky's style of play as follows: "He was a complete player. He excelled in technique and tactical awareness. He commanded the ball while in motion and often managed to beat opponents with a simple feint. Moreover, he executed plays with great precision and finesse. He was a free-kick specialist." A former Rapid București teammate, Ion Costea, said: "Barátky is the greatest Romanian footballer. Compared to Dobrin, he had an incredible leap, and Hagi paled in comparison to him!"

== Death ==
Baratky died on 14 April 1962 at age 51 in Bucharest, Romania.

== Career statistics ==
Appearances and goals by national team and year
| National team | Year | Apps | Goals |
|---|---|---|---|
| Hungary | 1930 | 2 | 0 |
| Hungary | 1931 | 1 | 0 |
| Hungary | 1932 | 1 | 0 |
| Hungary | 1933 | 5 | 0 |
| Total | | 9 | 0 |
| Romania | 1933 | 1 | 0 |
| Romania | 1934 | 0 | 0 |
| Romania | 1935 | 3 | 0 |
| Romania | 1936 | 0 | 0 |
| Romania | 1937 | 6 | 7 |
| Romania | 1938 | 5 | 2 |
| Romania | 1939 | 1 | 0 |
| Romania | 1940 | 4 | 4 |
| Total | | 20 | 13 |

=== International goals ===
Romania score listed first, score column indicates score after each Baratky goal.

List of international goals scored by Iuliu Baratky for Romania
| No. | Date | Venue | Opponent | Score | Result | Competition |
|---|---|---|---|---|---|---|
| 1 | 10 June 1937 | Stadionul Regele Carol II, Bucharest, Romania | Belgium | 1–0 | 2–1 | Friendly |
| 2 | 10 June 1937 | Stadionul Regele Carol II, Bucharest, Romania | Belgium | 2–0 | 2–1 | Friendly |
| 3 | 27 June 1937 | Stadionul Regele Carol II, Bucharest, Romania | Sweden | 1–0 | 2–2 | Friendly |
| 4 | 27 June 1937 | Stadionul Regele Carol II, Bucharest, Romania | Sweden | 2–2 | 2–2 | Friendly |
| 5 | 4 July 1937 | Stadion Miejski ŁKS, Łódź, Poland | Poland | 2–1 | 4–2 | Friendly |
| 6 | 4 July 1937 | Stadion Miejski ŁKS, Łódź, Poland | Poland | 4–2 | 4–2 | Friendly |
| 7 | 6 September 1937 | Stadion Beogradski SK, Belgrade, Yugoslavia | Yugoslavia | 1–2 | 1–2 | King Carol II Cup |
| 8 | 5 June 1938 | Parc de Sports du T.O.E.C., Toulouse, France | Cuba | 2–2 | 3–3 | 1938 World Cup |
| 9 | 4 December 1938 | Stadion Letenský, Prague, Czechoslovakia | Czechoslovakia | 1–0 | 2–6 | Eduard Benes' Cup |
| 10 | 31 March 1940 | Stadionul ONEF, Bucharest, Romania | Yugoslavia | 2–2 | 3–3 | Friendly |
| 11 | 14 April 1940 | Stadio Nazionale PNF, Rome, Italy | Italy | 1–2 | 1–2 | Friendly |
| 12 | 14 July 1940 | Riederwaldstadion, Frankfurt am Main, Nazi Germany | Germany | 1–4 | 3–9 | Friendly |
| 13 | 14 July 1940 | Riederwaldstadion, Frankfurt am Main, Nazi Germany | Germany | 3–8 | 3–9 | Friendly |

== Honours ==
=== Player ===
MTK Hungária

- Nemzeti Bajnokság I: 1928–29
- Magyar Kupa: 1931–32

Rapid București

- Cupa României: 1936–37, 1937–38, 1938–39, 1939–40, 1940–41, 1941–42
- Cupa Basarabiei: 1941–42
- Mitropa Cup finalist: 1940

=== Manager ===
Rapid București

- Cupa României: 1941–42
- Cupa Basarabiei: 1941–42

Universitatea Cluj

- Cupa României runner-up: 1948–49
- Divizia B: 1950

Dinamo București

- Cupa României: 1958–59
