= Constantin Anghelache =

Romanian footballer

Personal information
- Date of birth: 1 May 1920
- Place of birth: Bucharest, Romania
- Date of death: 28 September 2015 (aged 95)
- Place of death: Bacău, Romania
- Position: Midfielder

Youth career
- 1933–1935: Unirea Tricolor București

Senior career*
Years	Team	Apps	(Gls)
1935–1947	Unirea Tricolor București (Note: The 1940–41 Divizia A was the last season before World War II and the 1946–47 Divizia A was the first one after, so the appearances during this period for Unirea Tricolor București are not official.)	54	(0)
1953	Metalul Câmpina		

Managerial career
- 1951–1952: Letea Bacău
- 1953: Metalul Câmpina (assistant)
- 1954: Metalul Câmpina
- 1956: Energia Câmpina
- * Club domestic league appearances and goals

Constantin Anghelache (1 May 1920 – 28 September 2015) was a Romanian football midfielder, manager and a World War II veteran.

== Life and career ==
Anghelache joined Unirea Tricolor București after being seen by coach Petre Steinbach at a school competition. He played all the minutes in all 24 matches of the 1940–41 season, in which Unirea Tricolor won the championship. According to former coach Gheorghe Constantin, during the period Anghelache was a member of the fascist Iron Guard, often donning the organization's characteristic green shirt. He was a student at the National University of Physical Education and Sport (ANEFS), graduating in 1942. During his college years at ANEFS he became one of the best alpine skiers from the university, a performance which convinced the Romanian royal family to hire him to be Prince Michael's ski instructor. In 1944 he fought for the Romanian Armed Forces in World War II as a sub-lieutenant, being the only survivor of the footballers from Unirea Tricolor who were incorporated, as his teammates Petre Sucitulescu, Gicu Cristescu, Traian Ionescu and Andrei Alecu died on different battlefields of the Eastern Front. After he returned from the war, he graduated law school in 1947 and continued to play for Unirea Tricolor, being also the team's secretary. In 1947, after the Communist regime came in Romania, the Ministry of Internal Affairs wanted Unirea Tricolor to merge with Ciocanul București in order to create Dinamo București. Anghelache, together with the club's president Valeriu Negulescu and coach Ștefan Cârjan opposed the merger. All three of them were sent to jail for their past membership in or suspected sympathy for the fascist Iron Guard. They later claimed the arrests were the result of their opposition to the merger. In 1949 Angheleache received a two years and four months sentence which was served in the Jilava and Aiud prisons.

After he was released from jail, he moved to Bacău, where he worked at the Letea factory and started his coaching career at the factory's team from the third division. He later had a few spells at Metalul Câmpina, but in 1958 he was banned from coaching because of political reasons, so he worked illegally, being an unofficial coach at Dinamo Bacău, Poiana Câmpina and Tractorul Brașov. In 1970, Anghelache founded the High School of Football Bacău, which was the first football high school with a football program in Romania, where he worked as a teacher. From 1970 until the early 1980s he coached children and juniors at the high school he founded and at the FCM Bacău and Tractorul Brașov clubs, teaching generations of players, 67 of them reaching the senior or junior national teams of Romania including Sorin Avram, Vasile Șoiman and Costel Solomon.

In 1995 he was named Honorary member of the Romanian Football Federation. Anghelache kept all the writings of his former Unirea Tricolor coach, Ștefan Cârjan who died in 1978, releasing in 1996 the volume titled În slujba unui rege – fotbalul (In the service of a king – football), which is a romanced presentation of Unirea Tricolor's history. On 28 May 2010 he was awarded the Honorary Citizen of Bacău title. Since 27 September 2012, the stadium known until then as Letea, changed its name into Stadionul Constantin Anghelache in his honor. Anghelache spent the final years of his life in a nursing home from Bacău.

== Honours ==
=== Player ===
Unirea Tricolor București

- Divizia A: 1940–41
- Divizia B: 1938–39
- Cupa României runner-up: 1935–36, 1940–41
