= 1954 Cupa României final =

- Event: 1954 Cupa României
Metalul Reșița	Dinamo București
2	0
- Date: 5 December 1954
- Venue: Republicii, Bucharest
- Referee: Dumitru Schulder (Bucharest)
- Attendance: 30,000

The 1954 Cupa României final was the 17th final of Romania's most prestigious football cup competition.

FC Dinamo București attacked furiously in the first half-hour but missed many chances before Metalul Reșița's striker Ștefan Szeleș scored twice ('30, '40), following two fast counterattacks. Dinamo tried to come back, but were unable as Metalul's players held their ground and marched to a legendary victory.

Republicii Stadium was the place of the final which was later demolished by Nicolae Ceaușescu to make room for the Palace of the Parliament.

Metalul Reșița become the first club representing Divizia B which won the Romanian Cup final.

== Match details ==
5 December 1954
13:30 EET

Metalul Reșița	2–0	Dinamo București
Szeleș 30', 40'	Report

Republicii, Bucharest
Attendance: 30,000
Referee: Dumitru Schulder (Bucharest)

GK	1	(Romania) Iosif Zarici
DF	2	(Romania) Emil Chirilă
DF	3	(Romania) Valentin Teodorescu
DF	4	(Romania) Eugen Potoceanu
MF	5	(Romania) Mihai Munteanu
MF	6	(Romania) Ștefan Apro
FW	7	(Romania) Iosif Jojart II
FW	8	(Romania) Petru Mioc
FW	9	(Romania) Ștefan Urcan
FW	10	(Romania) Petre Iovan (substituted off) 70'
FW	11	(Romania) Ștefan Szeleș
Substitutions:
FW	12	(Romania) Vida (substituted in) 70'
Manager:
(Romania) Mihai Zsizsik

GK	1	(Romania) Constantin Constantinescu
DF	2	(Romania) Iosif Szökő
DF	3	(Romania) Ladislau Băcuț
DF	4	(Romania) Anton Fodor
MF	5	(Romania) Valeriu Călinoiu
MF	6	(Romania) Gheorghe Băcuț
FW	7	(Romania) Carol Bartha
FW	8	(Romania) Nicolae Dumitru
FW	9	(Romania) Alexandru Ene
FW	10	(Romania) Titus Ozon (substituted off) 46'
FW	11	(Romania) Ion Suru
Substitutions:
FW	12	(Romania) Valeriu Neagu (substituted in) 46'
Manager:
(Romania) Angelo Niculescu

== See also ==
- List of Cupa României finals
