= Vasile Chiroiu =

Romanian footballer

Personal information
- Date of birth: 13 August 1910
- Place of birth: Nagykomlós, Austria-Hungary
- Date of death: May 9, 1976 (aged 65)
- Height: 1.81 m (5 ft 11 in)
- Position: Defender

Senior career*
Years	Team	Apps	(Gls)
1926–1928	Politehnica Timișoara		
1928–1930	Banatul Timișoara		
1930–1931	Politehnica Timișoara		
1931–1934	CFR București	20	(14)
1934–1935	CA Oradea	17	(4)
1935–1939	Ripensia Timişoara	63	(7)
1939–1940	CAM Timișoara	13	(0)
1940–1941	UM Cugir	13	(0)
Total		126	(25)

International career
1931–1938	Romania	9	(0)
- * Club domestic league appearances and goals

Vasile Chiroiu (August 13, 1910 – May 9, 1976) was a Romanian football defender who played for Romania in the 1938 FIFA World Cup.

== Honours ==
Ripensia Timişoara

- Liga I (2): 1935–36, 1937–38
- Cupa României (1): 1935–36
