= Jenő Konrád =

Hungarian footballer and manager

Personal information
- Date of birth: 13 August 1894
- Place of birth: Bácspalánka, Austria-Hungary (now Bačka Palanka Serbia)
- Date of death: 15 July 1978 (aged 83)
- Place of death: New York City, United States of America
- Position: Defender

Senior career*
Years	Team	Apps	(Gls)
1909–1911	Budapesti AK		
1911–1919	MTK Budapest		
1919–1924	Austria Vienna		
1924–1925	First Vienna		
1925–1926	Austria Vienna		

International career
1915	Hungary	1	(0)

Managerial career
- 1925–1926: Austria Vienna
- 1926: SC Wacker Wien
- 1927: Chinezul Timișoara
- 1927–1929: Wiener AC
- 1929–1930: Hakoah Vienna
- 1930–1932: 1. FC Nürnberg
- 1932–1933: Ripensia Timișoara
- 1934–1935: 1. FC Brno
- 1935: FK Austria Wien
- 1936: Ripensia Timișoara
- 1936–1938: US Triestina
- 1938–1939: Lille
- 1939–1940: Sporting CP (Assistant)
- * Club domestic league appearances and goals

Jenő Konrád (13 August 1894 – 15 July 1978) also referred to as Eugen Conrad or Eugène Conrad or Eugenio Konrad was a Hungarian footballer and manager. In the 1910s he played on the Hungary national team with his brother, Kálmán Konrád. He is most noted for his career as a football manager; he managed SC Wacker Wien, Chinezul Timișoara, Wiener AC, Hakoah Vienna, 1. FC Nürnberg, FC Ripensia Timișoara, 1. FC Brno, FK Austria Wien, US Triestina, and Olympique Lillois.

== Honours ==
=== Manager ===
Chinezul Timişoara

- Divizia A: 1926–27

Ripensia Timişoara

- Divizia A: 1932–33, 1935–36
- Cupa României: 1935–36
