= Nicolae Reuter =

Romanian footballer

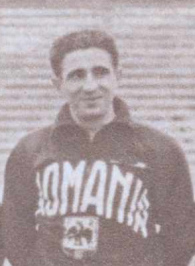
- Reuter in 1940

Personal information
- Date of birth: 6 December 1914
- Place of birth: Temesvár, Austria-Hungary
- Date of death: 1996 (aged 82)
- Position: Striker

Senior career*
Years	Team	Apps	(Gls)
1938–1941	CAM Timișoara		
1942–1944	CFR Turnu Severin		
1944–1952	CFR Timișoara		

International career
1939–1947	Romania	14	(2)

Managerial career
- 1961: Politehnica Timișoara
- 1963–1964: Politehnica Timișoara
- 1966–1972: Politehnica Timișoara
- * Club domestic league appearances and goals

Nicolae Reuter (born 6 December 1914) was a Romanian footballer who played as a striker. He scored two goals in the 4–0 victory in the 1943 Cupa României final against Sportul Studențesc București, which helped CFR Turnu Severin win the first trophy in the club's history. After he ended his playing career, Reuter worked as a manager.

== International career ==
While playing in the second league for CAM Timișoara Nicolae Reuter made his debut at international level for Romania in a friendly which ended with a 4–0 victory against Latvia. At the 1946 Balkan Cup he played three games and scored two goals against Bulgaria and Yugoslavia, he also played two matches at the 1947 Balkan Cup.

== Honours ==
=== Player ===
CAM Timișoara

- Divizia B: 1938–39
- Cupa României runner-up: 1937–38

CFR Turnu Severin

- Cupa României: 1942–43

CFR Timișoara

- Cupa României runner-up: 1947–48
