= Ștefan Filotti =

Romanian footballer

Personal information
- Date of birth: 19 September 1922
- Place of birth: Brăila, Romania
- Date of death: 28 September 1969 (aged 47)
- Position: Forward

Senior career*
Years	Team	Apps	(Gls)
1940–1942	Franco Româna Brăila	32	(8)
1942–1958	Rapid București (Note: The Divizia A 1940–41 was the last season before World War II and the Divizia A 1946–47 was the first one after, so the appearances and goals scored during this period for Rapid București are not official with the exception of the 1945–46 regional championship, the same as the 1957 unofficial championship called Cupa Primăverii, also the statistics for the 1952 and 1955 Divizia B seasons are unavailable.)	185	(76)
Total		217	(84)

International career
1942–1956	Romania	13	(1)
- * Club domestic league appearances and goals

Ștefan Filotti (19 September 1922 – 28 September 1969) was a Romanian forward.

== International career ==
Ștefan Filotti played 13 games at international level for Romania, making his debut in a friendly which ended 2–0 against Croatia. He scored his only goal in a 4–1 victory against Albania. Filotti also played in a 3–0 loss against Hungary at the 1947 Balkan Cup and in a 2–0 loss against Czechoslovakia at the 1954 World Cup qualifiers.

== Honours ==
Rapid București

- Divizia B: 1952, 1955
- Cupa României: 1941–42
- Cupa Primăverii: 1957
