= Constantin Rădulescu (footballer, born 1924) =

Romanian doctor, footballer and manager

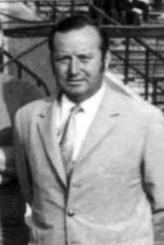
- Rădulescu in the 1970s

Personal information
- Date of birth: 30 May 1924
- Place of birth: Bucharest, Romania
- Date of death: October 2001 (aged 77)
- Place of death: Cluj-Napoca, Romania
- Position: Midfielder

Senior career*
| Years | Team | Apps | (Gls) |
| 1938–1942 | Olympia București | | |
| 1942–1943 | Sportul Studențesc (Note: The 1940–41 Divizia A was the last season before World War II and the 1946–47 Divizia A was the first one after, so the appearances during this period for Sportul Studențesc are not official.) | 0 | (0) |
| 1943–1949 | Universitatea Cluj (Note: The 1940–41 Divizia A was the last season before World War II and the 1946–47 Divizia A was the first one after, so the appearances during this period for Universitatea Cluj are not official.) | 72 | (10) |
| 1950–1956 | Locomotiva Cluj | | |

Managerial career
- 1957–1960: CFR Cluj
- 1960–1962: Știința Cluj (assistant)
- 1962–1963: Știința Cluj
- 1963–1969: CFR Cluj
- 1969–1970: CFR Cluj
- 1971–1974: CFR Cluj
- 1976–1977: Universitatea Cluj
- 1979–1982: CFR Cluj
- 1982–1984: CUG Cluj
- 1984–1986: Sticla Arieșul Turda
- 1992–1995: CFR Cluj
- * Club domestic league appearances and goals as of 2 March 2018

Constantin Rădulescu (30 May 1924 – October 2001), commonly known as Dr. Constantin Rădulescu, was a Romanian doctor, footballer and manager. As a footballer he played mainly as a midfielder.

In 2005, as a tribute to the work done in building and raising the club, CFR Cluj renamed its stadium as Stadionul Dr. Constantin Rădulescu.

== Playing career ==
Rădulescu, nicknamed "Jumate" (Half) because he was speaking with a stutter, was born on 30 May 1924 in Bucharest, Romania. He began playing senior-level football in 1938 at local club Olympia, aged 14. In 1942 he joined Sportul Studențesc with whom he reached the 1943 Cupa României final, playing the entire match in the 4–0 loss to CFR Turnu Severin.

In 1943, Rădulescu signed with Universitatea Cluj, a team that played at Sibiu in that period as a consequence of the territorial agreement known as the Second Vienna Award, by which Northern Transylvania became part of the Kingdom of Hungary as a result of World War II events. His best season was the 1947–48 Divizia A in which he scored seven goals in 28 appearances that helped "U" Cluj finish in fifth place. In the following season they reached the 1949 Cupa României final, which was lost to CSCA București, but he did not play in it. In 1949, after totaling 72 Divizia A appearances with 10 goals, he left "U" because of some misunderstandings and would declare later in his autobiographical book:"Honestly, I split hard and regretfully from this wonderful team, which deserves all superlatives."

After leaving "U", Rădulescu continued his career at rival CFR, known at the time as Locomotiva, for which he played six years, retiring in 1956 at age 31 due to a serious injury. Rădulescu was a player known for his ability to turn throw-ins into real corner kicks. His daughter, Ioana Stanca Gidro, claimed that he refused to play for the Romanian national team because he did not want to lose his doctor's position.

== Managerial career ==
Rădulescu started coaching in 1957 when he replaced Ștefan Dobay at CFR. After some seasons in Divizia B and Divizia C with The Railwaymen he signed with Universitatea Cluj, known at that time as Știința. There, in the first two seasons he worked as an assistant for Andrei Sepci and Neța Gheorghe respectively. In the 1962–63 season he was head coach as the team finished in fourth place. In the summer of 1963 he went back to CFR, known at the time as CSM Cluj, and in 1969 he succeeded in promoting them to Divizia A. The team had inadequate training, organizational and financial conditions, as Rădulescu said in his book:"No finances and players, no headquarters, secretary or organizer. So we started in the first league in 1969." However, he worked on different positions in the club to maintain the team in the top tier of Romanian football until 1976. At the end of the 1972–73 season he earned a fifth place, the best ranking in the club's history until 2006. Afterwards he coached in the Romanian lower leagues, initially returning to Universitatea for the 1976–77 Divizia B season, where the team finished in 12th place. Then, in 1979 he went back to CFR, staying until 1982 before moving to CUG Cluj and subsequently working at Sticla Arieșul Turda. In 1992, at the age of 68, Rădulescu returned to CFR for a final time and managed the team for three years in Divizia C, contributing to the creation of the squad that would gain promotion a year later. He has a total of 157 matches as a manager in the Romanian top-division, Divizia A, consisting of 54 victories, 45 draws and 58 losses.

=== Managing style ===
As a manager he is considered a real Alex Ferguson of CFR Cluj by former player Marius Bretan. Another former player Romică Petrescu said:"Ajax and CFR used the same training methods. The training cycle was taken from Ajax, with two training sessions on Tuesday, two on Thursday, free on Wednesday. Everything was done counter-clockwise, after pulse, after tension." Augustin Țegean, a CFR legend described him:"A distinct character from all points of view: tough, severe, does not give up his principles. He always told us that he was the only one allowed to make jokes because he was from Bucharest. He was a strong personality, we all respected him. We were afraid of him. [..] I can say he was using new methods for those times. He explained the game schemes on the board. The marks were made man-to-man. Everyone knew exactly what area to cover on the pitch. His methods were the most modern." In 1972, the Minister of Transport asked him to take over Rapid București, but he refused by demanding, unreasonably, that Rică Răducanu, a star of the team, be kicked out.

== Writing ==
Rădulescu wrote an autobiographical volume titled O viață închinată fotbalului (A life dedicated to football).

== Personal life and death ==
Rădulescu grew up with three brothers, and his father worked at a cigarette factory while his mother was a housewife. As a child, he started playing football with friends in the Regie neighborhood where he was born. In 1935, he went to the Gheorghe Șincai high school. He also worked as a doctor, managing to become the head of the ENT Department at CFR Cluj Hospital. During his time spent with Universitatea Cluj in Sibiu, he met a woman who he married in 1950, and they had a daughter together named Stanca Ioana Gidro. Rădulescu died in October 2001 in Cluj-Napoca. Since 2008, CFR's stadium was named Stadionul Dr. Constantin Rădulescu in his honor.

== Honours ==
=== Player ===
Sportul Studențesc

- Cupa României runner-up: 1942–43

Universitatea Cluj

- Cupa României runner-up: 1948–49

=== Manager ===
CFR Cluj

- Divizia B: 1968–69
