= 1988 Cupa României final =

- Event: 1987–88 Cupa României
Steaua București	Dinamo București
Divizia A	Divizia A
2	1
- Date: 26 June 1988
- Venue: 23 August, Bucharest
- Referee: Radu Petrescu (Brașov)
- Attendance: 45,000

The 1988 Cupa României final was the 50th final of Romania's most prestigious football cup competition. The match was between Steaua București and Dinamo București, and was won by Steaua București. It was the club's 16th cup, but later in 1990 Steaua gave back the trophy because it was won unfairly.

== Route to the final ==
Steaua București

Round of 32	Voinţa București	0–3	Steaua București
Round of 16	Maramureş Baia Mare	1–3	Steaua București
Quarter-finals	Steaua București	2–1	Universitatea Craiova
Semi-finals	Steaua București	3–1	Sportul Studenţesc București

Dinamo București

Round of 32	Montana Sinaia	1–2	Dinamo București
Round of 16	Dinamo București	4–1	Progresul Brăila
Quarter-finals	Dinamo București	4–2	Corvinul Hunedoara
Semi-finals	Dinamo București	4–2	Victoria București

== Background ==
The goal scored by Balint wasn't validated because of offside, at the signaling of assistant referee George Ionescu. Steaua retired from the field after the command of Valentin Ceaușescu, the son of president Nicolae Ceaușescu, but the Romanian Football Federation offered the Cup to Steaua București. In 1990, Steaua renounced the trophy because it was won unjustly.

The match was interrupted in 90th minute at the score 1–1, because the goal scored by Steaua was cancelled for the offside. In the end, the final was 2–1 for Steaua, but the team renounced the trophy.

== Match details ==
26 June 1988
19:00 EET

Steaua București	2–1	Dinamo București
Lăcătuș 27'; Balint 90'	Report	Răducioiu 87'

23 August, Bucharest
Attendance: 45,000
Referee: Radu Petrescu (Brașov)

GK	1	(Romania) Gheorghe Liliac
DF	2	(Romania) Ștefan Iovan
DF	4	(Romania) Adrian Bumbescu
DF	6	(Romania) Miodrag Belodedici
DF	3	(Romania) Iosif Rotariu
MF	8	(Romania) Lucian Bălan
MF	5	(Romania) Tudorel Stoica (c)
MF	11	(Romania) Gheorghe Popescu
MF	10	(Romania) Gheorghe Hagi
FW	7	(Romania) Marius Lăcătuș
FW	9	(Romania) Victor Pițurcă (substituted off) 52'
Substitutions:
FW	12	(Romania) Gabi Balint (substituted in) 52'
Manager:
(Romania) Anghel Iordănescu

GK	1	(Romania) Dumitru Moraru
DF	3	(Romania) Iulian Mihăescu (substituted off) 46'
DF	4	(Romania) Mircea Rednic
DF	6	(Romania) Ioan Andone
DF	2	(Romania) Ioan Varga
MF	5	(Romania) Dănuț Lupu
MF	8	(Romania) Ioan Lupescu
MF	10	(Romania) Dorin Mateuț
MF	11	(Romania) Costel Orac (substituted off) 82'
FW	9	(Romania) Rodion Cămătaru
FW	7	(Romania) Claudiu Vaișcovici
Substitutions:
DF	12	(Romania) Lică Movilă (substituted in) 46'
FW	13	(Romania) Florin Răducioiu (substituted in) 82'
Manager:
(Romania) Mircea Lucescu

Match Officials

- Assistant referees:
  - (Romania) Gheorghe Constantin
  - (Romania) George Ionescu

== See also ==
- List of Cupa României finals
- Eternal derby (Romania)
