= Stadionul Giulești-Valentin Stănescu =

Stadionul Giulești-Valentin Stănescu is the name of several football stadiums. It may refer to:

- Stadionul Giulești-Valentin Stănescu (1939) – the original stadium, demolished in 2019
- Stadionul Rapid-Giulești – its replacement, opened in 2022
