= Ștefan Cârjan =

Romanian footballer

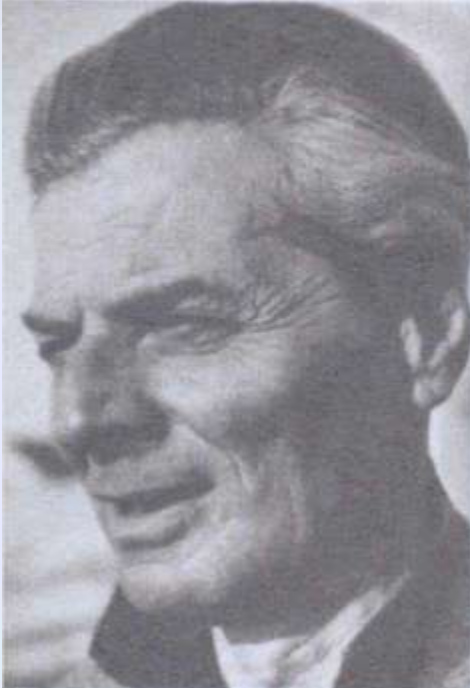

Personal information
- Date of birth: 10 May 1909
- Place of birth: Bucharest, Kingdom of Romania
- Date of death: 18 November 1978 (aged 69)
- Position: Left winger

Senior career*
Years	Team	Apps	(Gls)
1926–1947	Unirea Tricolor București (Note: The 1940–41 Divizia A was the last season before World War II and the 1946–47 Divizia A was the first one after, so the appearances during this period for Unirea Tricolor București are not official.)	135	(27)

Managerial career
- 1938–1947: Unirea Tricolor București
- 1948: Universitatea Cluj
- 1969–1970: Universitatea Cluj
- * Club domestic league appearances and goals

Ștefan Cârjan (10 May 1909 – 18 November 1978) was a Romanian football left winger and manager.

== Life and career ==
Cârjan was born on 10 May 1909 in the Dracului neighborhood of Bucharest, Romania. He played over 20 years for Unirea Tricolor București and won the 1940–41 Divizia A title as a player-coach, appearing in 12 games without scoring. In 1947, after the Communist regime came in Romania, the Ministry of Internal Affairs wanted Unirea Tricolor to merge with Ciocanul București in order to create Dinamo București. Cârjan, together with the club's president Valeriu Negulescu and player-secretary Constantin Anghelache opposed the merger. All three of them were sent to jail for their past membership in or suspected sympathy for the fascist Iron Guard; in particular, Cârjan was accused of harboring Iron Guard members after their failed rebellion. Anghelache and former coach Gheorghe Constantin claimed the arrests were the result of their opposition to the merger. In 1948, Cârjan received a ten years sentence, which was served in Jilava and Aiud. Historian Gheorghe Bodea claimed he also passed through Gherla, Pitești, and Văcărești prisons. After finishing his sentence, because of his refusal to collaborate with the Communist regime, Cârjan was forced to work for four years at the cutting of the common reed from the Danube Delta.

After his death, in 1978, Cârjan's former player from Unirea Tricolor, Constantin Anghelache, who kept all his writings, released in 1996 the volume named În slujba unui rege – fotbalul (In the service of a king – football), which is a romanced presentation of Unirea Tricolor's history.

Cârjan also had a manuscript which he wrote during his period spent as coach at Universitatea Cluj, which was released in two volumes. These are Cârjan's volumes, which were released after his death:

- În slujba unui rege – fotbalul (In the service of a king – football) (1996)
- Însemnări despre "U" (Notes about "U") (2004)
- Ideea U (The U idea) (2011)

== Honours ==
=== Player ===
Unirea Tricolor București

- Divizia A: 1940–41
- Divizia B: 1938–39
- Cupa României runner-up: 1935–36, 1940–41

=== Manager ===
Unirea Tricolor București

- Divizia A: 1940–41
- Divizia B: 1938–39
- Cupa României runner-up: 1940–41
