= 1942–43 Cupa României =

Tournament details
- Country: Romania

Final positions
- Champions: CFR Turnu Severin
- Runners-up: Sportul Studențesc București

The 1942–43 Cupa României was the tenth edition of Romania's most prestigious football cup competition.

The title was won by CFR Turnu Severin against Sportul Studențesc București.

== Format ==
The competition is an annual knockout tournament with pairings for each round drawn at random.

There are no seeds for the draw. The draw also determines which teams will play at home. Each tie is played as a single leg.

If a match is drawn after 90 minutes, the game goes in extra time, and if the scored is still tight after 120 minutes, there a replay will be played, usually at the ground of the team who were away for the first game.

The format is quite similar to the oldest recognised football tournament in the world, the FA Cup.

This season, due to World War II, no official editions of Divizia A, Divizia B or Divizia C were played.

== First round proper ==
Team 1	Score	Team 2
18 April 1943
Gloria Arad	3–1	Minerul Lupeni
Juventus București	5–1	Carmen București
Venus București	2–2 (a.e.t.)	Unirea Tricolor București
Textila Buhuşi	0–4	Gloria CFR Galați
Corvinul Deva	5–1	Mica Brad
Dacia VA Galaţi	1–9	FC Brăila
Vulturii Iaşi	0–4	Dragoş Vodă Cernăuţi
Vulturii Textila Lugoj	1–2	FC Craiova
Vitrometan Mediaş	1–2	Universitatea Cluj-Sibiu
Jiul Petroşani	9–0	Unirea MV Alba Iulia
Prahova Ploiești	3–5	Sportul Studențesc București
SSMR Reşiţa	1–2 (a.e.t.)	CFR Turnu Severin
Arsenal Sibiu	1–0	ACFR Braşov
Ripensia Timișoara	2–3 (a.e.t.)	UD Reșița
Oltul Turnu Măgurele	2–5	Rapid București
Malaxa Tohanu Vechi	0–3 (forfeit)	FC Ploiești
11 May 1943 — Replay
Unirea Tricolor București	2–0 (R)	Venus București

== Second round proper ==
Team 1	Score	Team 2
16 May 1943
FC Brăila	1–2	Gloria CFR Galați
Rapid București	4–0	Juventus București
Sportul Studențesc București	4–1	Unirea Tricolor București
Dragoş Vodă Cernăuţi	0–4	FC Ploiești
FC Craiova	1–1	CFR Turnu Severin
Corvinul Deva	2–4	Jiul Petroşani
UD Reșița	3–0 (forfeit)	Gloria Arad
Universitatea Cluj-Sibiu	10–1	Arsenal Sibiu

== Quarter-finals ==
Team 1	Score	Team 2
20 June 1943
Jiul Petroşani	2–1	FC Ploiești
CFR Turnu Severin	3–0	Universitatea Cluj-Sibiu
1 August 1943
Sportul Studențesc București	2–1	UD Reșița
2 August 1943
Rapid București	3–1	Gloria CFR Galați

== Semi-finals ==
Team 1	Score	Team 2
9 August 1943
Sportul Studențesc București	2–1	Rapid București
CFR Turnu Severin	2–1	Jiul Petroşani

== Final ==
15 August 1943
17:00 EET

CFR Turnu Severin	4–0	Sportul Studențesc București
Ludwig 32', 83'; Reuter 34', 58'	Report

ONEF, Bucharest
Attendance: 9,000
Referee: Emil Kroner (Bucharest)

Cupa României 1942–43 winners

1st title
