= Gheorghe Rășinaru =

Romanian footballer (1915–1994)

Personal information
- Date of birth: 10 February 1915
- Place of birth: Szászsebes, Austria-Hungary
- Date of death: 1994
- Height: 1.78 m (5 ft 10 in)
- Position: Midfielder

Senior career*
Years	Team	Apps	(Gls)
1932–1935	CFR Cluj		
1935–1944	Rapid București	106	(1)
1946–1948	Șoimii Sibiu		

International career
1937–1941	Romania	7	(0)
- * Club domestic league appearances and goals

Gheorghe Rășinaru (10 February 1915 – 1994) was a Romanian football midfielder who played for Romania in the 1938 FIFA World Cup. He spent most of his career playing for Rapid București.

== Honours ==
Rapid București

- Cupa României (6): 1936–37, 1937–38, 1938–39, 1939–40, 1940–41, 1941–42
