= Ioachim Moldoveanu =

Romanian footballer

Personal information
- Full name: Constantin Ioachim Moldoveanu
- Date of birth: 17 August 1913
- Place of birth: Marosújvár, Austria-Hungary
- Date of death: 31 July 1981 (aged 67)
- Place of death: Craiova, Romania
- Position: Forward

Senior career*
Years	Team	Apps	(Gls)
1934–1935	Ceramica Bistrița		
1935–1948	Rapid București	111	(28)

International career
1937–1943	Romania	11	(0)
- * Club domestic league appearances and goals

Constantin Ioachim Moldoveanu (17 August 1913 – 31 July 1981) was a Romanian football forward who played for Romania in the 1938 FIFA World Cup. He spent most of his career playing for Rapid București.

== Honours ==
Rapid București

- Cupa României (6): 1936–37, 1937–38, 1938–39, 1939–40, 1940–41, 1941–42
