= 1949 Cupa României final =

- Event: 1948–49 Cupa României
CSCA București	CSU Cluj
2	1
- Date: 18 December 1949
- Venue: ICAS, Bucharest
- Referee: Adalbert Kincs (Lugoj)
- Attendance: 12,000

The 1949 Cupa României final was the 12th final of Romania's most prestigious football cup competition. It was disputed between CSCA București and CSU Cluj, and was won by CSCA after a game with 3 goals. It was the first cup title in the history of CSCA București.

Due to scheduling issues, the final (though corresponding to the 1948–49 autumn-winter-spring season) was not played until mid-December; however this had no knock-on effect for the next season as it was decided to move both the league and cup to a spring-summer-autumn format in 1950.

== Match details ==
18 December 1949
14:00 EET

CSCA București	2–1	CSU Cluj
Moldoveanu 39'; Fernbach-Ferenczi 74'	Report	Zehan 68'

ICAS, Bucharest
Attendance: 12,000
Referee: Adalbert Kincs (Lugoj)

GK	1	(Romania) Traian Ionescu
DF	2	(Romania) Alexandru Apolzan
DF	3	(Romania) Adalbert Androvits
DF	4	(Romania) Ştefan Rodeanu
MF	5	(Romania) Ștefan Balint
MF	6	(Romania) Ștefan Onisie
FW	7	(Romania) Anton Fernbach-Ferenczi
FW	8	(Romania) Gavril Serfözö
FW	9	(Romania) Andrei Frentz
FW	10	(Romania) Nicolae Drăgan
FW	11	(Romania) Petre Moldoveanu
Manager:
(Romania) Francisc Ronnay

GK	1	(Romania) Vasile Cristea
DF	2	(Romania) Emeric Ioanovici
DF	3	(Romania) Mircea Luca
DF	4	(Romania) Mircea Tarău
MF	5	(Romania) Gheorghe Crăciun
MF	6	(Romania) Lucian Mihuţ
FW	7	(Romania) Iosif Lutz
FW	8	(Romania) Ilie Copil
FW	9	(Romania) Ștefan Kovacs
FW	10	(Romania) Mircea Biolan
FW	11	(Romania) Justin Zehan
Manager:
(Romania) Iuliu Baratky

== See also ==
- List of Cupa României finals
