= Ion Bogdan =

Romanian footballer (1915–1992)

Ionică Bogdan
Personal information
- Date of birth: 6 March 1915
- Place of birth: Bucharest, Romania
- Date of death: 10 July 1992 (aged 77)
- Position: Forward

Youth career
- 1928–1933: Unirea Tricolor București

Senior career*
Years	Team	Apps	(Gls)
1933–1936	Unirea Tricolor București	43	(23)
1936–1946	Rapid București	107	(55)
1938	→ Red Star Paris (loan)		
1946–1947	MTK Budapest	0	(0)
1947–1948	AS Bari	4	(1)
Total		154	(79)

International career
1937–1942	Romania	12	(3)

Managerial career
- 1966–1967: Al-Shabiba Mazraa
- 1967–1970: Racing Beirut
- * Club domestic league appearances and goals

Ion Bogdan (6 March 1915 – 10 July 1992) was a Romanian international footballer and coach, he played for Unirea Tricolor București, CFR București, Red Star Paris, MTK Budapest, and AS Bari in the Serie A. He earned 12 caps for Romania national team scoring three goals, and participated at the 1938 FIFA World Cup in a match against Cuba.

== Honours ==
=== Player ===
Rapid București

- Cupa României (6): 1936–37, 1937–38, 1938–39, 1939–40, 1940–41, 1941–42

=== Coach ===
Al-Shabiba Mazraa

- Lebanese League: 1966–67

Racing Beirut

- Lebanese League: 1969–70

=== Individual ===
- Total matches played in Romanian First League: 150 matches – 78 goals
- Top scorer of Romanian First League: 1940–41
- European Cups (Mitropa Cup): 9 matches – 3 goals
- Romania B: 2 matches – 2 goals
