= Stadionul Venus =

Multi-purpose stadium in Bucharest, Romania

- Interactive map of Stadionul Venus
- Location: Bucharest, Romania
- Coordinates: 44.436206°N 26.076629°E
- Capacity: 15,000
- Surface: Grass, Clay

Construction
- Opened: 11 October 1931
- Demolished: 1953

Tenants
- Venus București (1928–1949); Romania (1939); Steaua București (1947)

Venus Stadium was a multi-use stadium in Bucharest, Romania. It was the home ground of Venus Bucharest. It held 15,000 people.

Venus arena was inaugurated in 1931 as a field dedicated only to football. One of the oldest and most truthful leaders of the club, Alexandru Eladescu, sold a forest, private property, to obtain the necessary money to build the stadium. It held five Romanian Cup finals and one Romania match on May 18, 1939, against Latvia finished 4–0. After the communist authorities came to power in Romania the club was dissolved and the arena demolished. It was situated where Parcul Operei is today.
