= FC Ripensia Timișoara =

Romanian football club

Ripensia Timișoara
- Full name: SC FC Ripensia Timișoara SA
- Nicknames: Ripi; Galben-roșii (The Yellow and Reds)
- Short name: Ripensia
- Founded: 21 October 1928; 97 years ago
- Ground: Ciarda Roșie
- Capacity: 1,000
- Chairman: Dumitru Mihu
- Head coach: Nicușor-Dumitru Butnărașu
- League: Liga IV
- 2025–26: Liga IV, Timiș County, 11th of 16
- Website: ripensiatimisoara.ro
Home colours	Away colours

Fotbal Club Ripensia Timișoara (Romanian pronunciation: [timiˈʃo̯ara]), commonly known as Ripensia Timișoara, or simply as Ripensia, is a Romanian professional football club based in Timișoara, Timiș County, which currently plays in Liga IV Timiș County, the fourth tier of the Romanian football.

Ripensia Timișoara was founded in 1928 with red and yellow colours and was the first club in Romania to adopt professional status. It was initially unable to compete in the national league system until the 1932–33 season, after which it became one of the leading clubs in the country, winning four national titles and two national cups. The club was dissolved in 1948 due to a lack of support under the communist regime. It was re-established in 2012 and enrolled in Liga VI Timiș County, the sixth tier of the Romanian football league system and the third level of county football.

Historically, it has a heated rivalry with Politehnica Timișoara.

== History ==
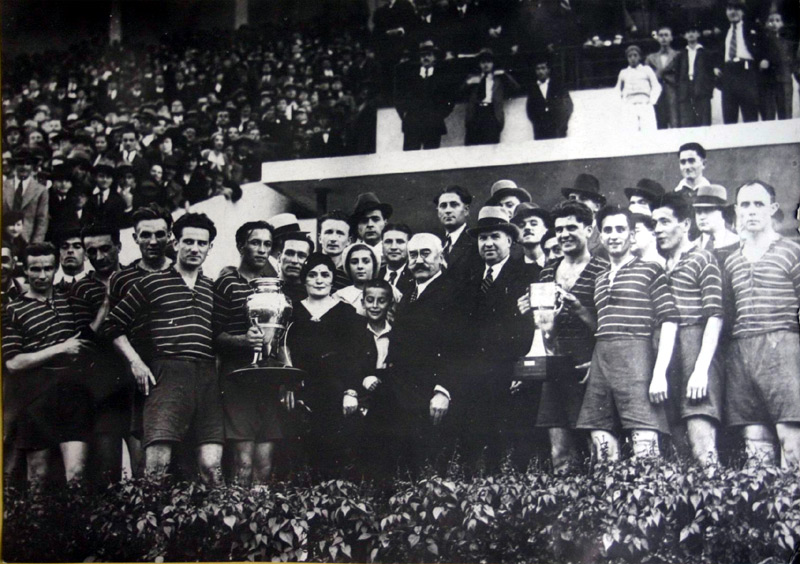
Ripensia Timișoara winning the 1933–34 Romanian Cup against "U. Cluj"

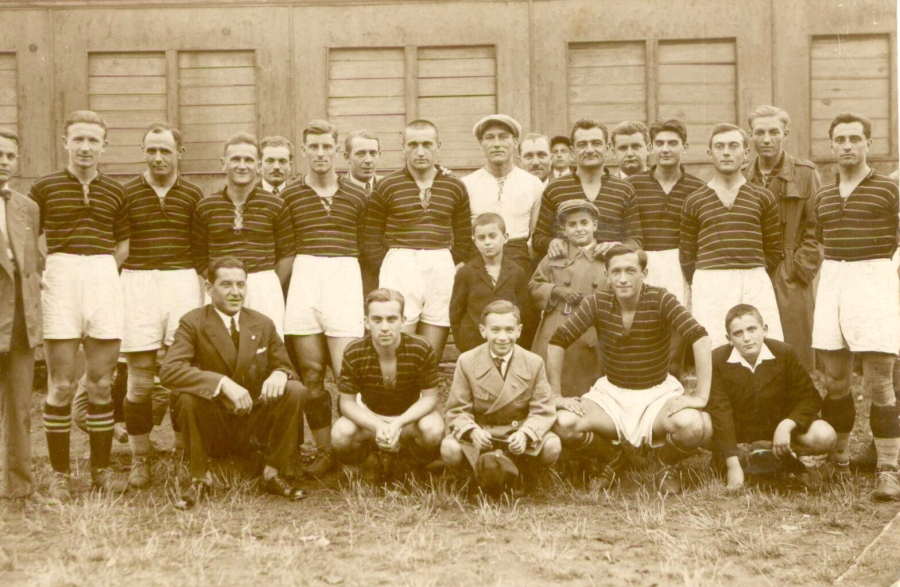
Ripensia Timișoara in 1931

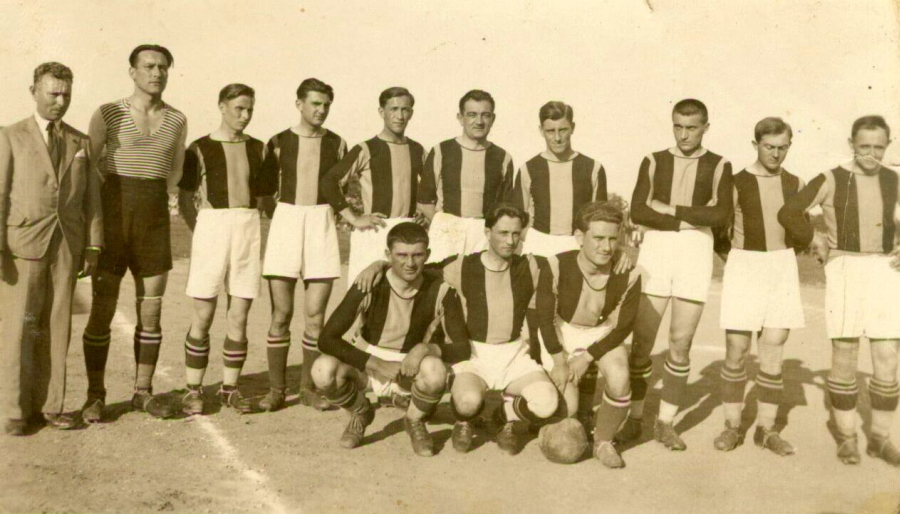
Ripensia Timișoara in 1932

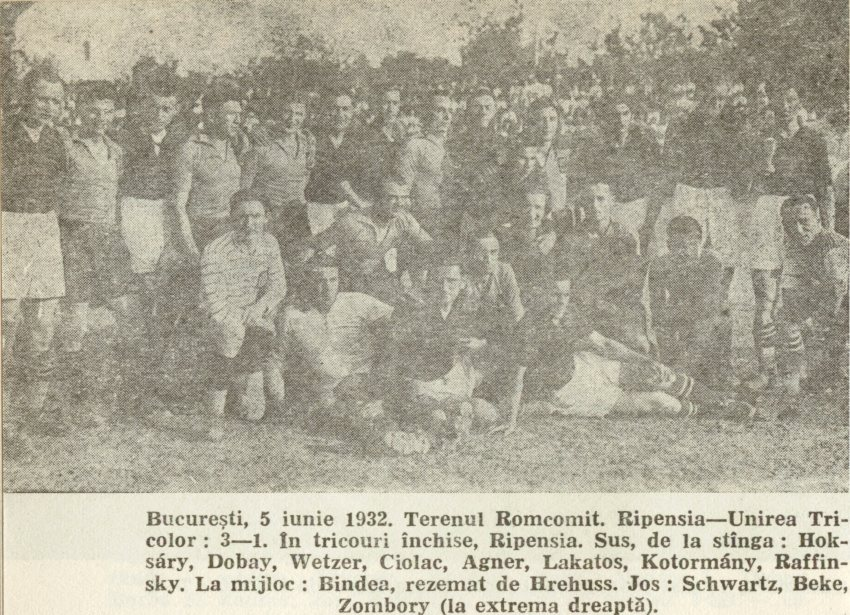
Ripensia-Unirea Tricolor 3–1 in 1932

It was founded in 1928 by Dr. Cornel Lazăr, a famous promoter of football in the Banat region, and the former president of Chinezul Timișoara. The players came from Chinezul Timișoara, C.A.T. and Poli Timișoara. Vilmos Kertész coached the team from 1931 to 1932. Due to its professional status, until 1932–1933 (the first season of the National League – Divizia A), the team and its players could not participate in official national competitions.

They were champions of the Romanian Football League in 1933, 1935, 1936, and 1938, with two Romanian Cup appearances, winning 3–2 over Universitatea Cluj in 1934 and 5–1 over Unirea Tricolor București in 1936. They were national vice-champions for 1933–34 and 1938–39. After World War II, due to financial problems, the communist sports organisation and controversial actions, Ripensia played in Divizia B and Divizia C. After 1948, without any support, it disappeared, merging with Electrica Timișoara. Their colours were red-yellow. Their home stadium was called Electrica (today UMT; the original wooden stand was demolished in 2004–2005). The greatest players in team history were:

- Goalkeepers: Vilmos Zombori, Dumitru Pavlovici
- Defenders: Rudolf Bürger, Balázs Hoksary
- Midfielders: Vasile Chiroiu II, Vasile Deheleanu, Rudolf Kotormány, Eugen Lakatos, Nicolae Simatoc
- Forwards: Gheorghe Oprean, Zoltán Beke, Silviu Bindea, Gheorghe Ciolac, Ştefan Dobay, Ladislau Raffinski, Sándor Schwartz, Graţian Sepi II, Mihai Tänzer, Adalbert Marksteiner

In the 2012 the team was reestablished and competed in the municipal championship, they won it and promoted to Liga V. In Liga V they reached the first place in the 2013–2014 season and promoted to the next league Liga IV. Also they made a good impression in the 2013–14 Romanian Cup, where they defeated again Universitatea Cluj to reach the Last 16 of the cup making them the surprise of the cup. In the Last 16 they lost to Pandurii Târgu Jiu.

In the 2014–15 Liga IV season, Ripi had a tough opponent, in the position of ASU Politehnica Timișoara, the fan-owned phoenix club formed after the dissolution of FC Politehnica Timișoara by its fans and finished only on the 2nd place.

Next season Ripensia had a perfect journey, won Liga IV – Timiș County and qualified for the promotion play-offs to Liga III. At the promotion play-off Ripensia met the champion of Hunedoara County, Hercules Lupeni, and they won without major difficulties, 7–0 on aggregate, thus ensuring promotion to the Liga III.

2016–17 Liga III season was the first one for Ripi in the last over 60 years. The team had a close fight for supremacy in the Seria IV against CSM Școlar Reșița, CSM Lugoj, Cetate Deva and Național Sebiș but in the end they won and promoted to Liga II after an absence of 69 years.

== Honours ==
=== Domestic ===
==== Leagues ====
- Liga I
  - Winners (4): 1932–33, 1934–35, 1935–36, 1937–38
  - Runners-up (2): 1933–34, 1938–39
- Liga III
  - Winners (2): 1946–47, 2016–17
- Liga IV – Timiș County
  - Winners (1): 2015–16
  - Runners-up (1): 2014–15
- Liga V – Timiș County
  - Winners (1): 2013–14
- Liga VI – Timiș County
  - Winners (2): 2012–13, 2023-24

==== Cups ====
- Cupa României
  - Winners (2): 1933–34, 1935–36
  - Runners-up (2): 1934–35, 1936–37

== Former players ==
The footballers enlisted below have had international cap(s) for their respective countries at junior and/or senior level.

Romania

- (Romania) Zoltan Beke
- (Romania) Silviu Bindea
- (Romania) Rudolf Bürger
- (Romania) Vasile Chiroiu
- (Romania) Gheorghe Ciolac
- (Romania) Sever Coracu
- (Romania) Vasile Deheleanu
- (Romania) Ștefan Dobay
- (Romania) Andrei Glanzmann
- (Romania) Balázs Hoksary
- (Romania) Rudolf Kotormány
- (Romania) Ștefan Kovács
- (Romania) Eugen Lakatos
- (Romania) József Moravetz
- (Romania) Dumitru Pavlovici
- (Romania) László Raffinsky
- (Romania) Alexandru Schwartz
- (Romania) Augustin Semler
- (Romania) Grațian Sepi
- (Romania) Nicolae Simatoc
- (Romania) Iosif Slivăț
- (Romania) Rudolf Wetzer
- (Romania) Vilmos Zombori

Hungary

- (Hungary) Ferenc Plattkó

Romania-Hungary

- (Romania) (Hungary) Nicolae Kovács
- (Romania) (Hungary) Adalbert Marksteiner
- (Romania) (Hungary) Mihai Tänzer

== Former managers ==
- (Romania) Rudolf Bürger (1939–1940)
- (Romania) Paul Codrea
- (Romania) Rudolf Wetzer
- (Hungary) Vilmos Kertész
- (Hungary) Jenő Konrád
- (Austria) Josef Uridil

== Domestic records and statistics ==
=== Key ===
- Pos = Final position
- P = Played
- W = Games won
- D = Games drawn
- L = Games lost
- GF = Goals For
- GA = Goals Against
- Pts = Points
- Div A / L1 = Liga I
- Div B / L2 = Liga II
- Div C / L3 = Liga III
- L4 = Liga IV
- L5 = Liga V
- L6 = Liga VI
- p = Preliminary Round
- 1R = Round 1
- 2R = Round 2
- 3R = Round 3
- 4R = Round 4
- 5R = Round 5
- GS = Group stage
- R32 = Round of 32
- QF = Quarter-finals
- R16 = Round of 16
- SF = Semi-finals
- F = Final

Champions	Runners-up	Third place	Promoted	Relegated

The players in bold were the top goalscorers in the division.

== League history ==
Season	Tier	Division	Place	Notes	Cupa României
2026–27	**4**	Liga IV (TM)	7th	In progress	Regional phase
2025–26	**4**	Liga IV (TM)	11th		**County winner**
2024–25	**5**	Liga V (TM)	2nd		
2023–24	**6**	Liga VI (TM)	**1st (C, P)**	Promoted	Second round
2022–23	**2**	Liga II	**17th / 7th (R)**	Relegated; withdrew	Fourth round
2021–22	**2**	Liga II	12th / 4th	Play-out B	Round of 32
2020–21	**2**	Liga II	15th / 4th	Play-out A	Round of 32
2019–20	**2**	Liga II	13th		Round of 32
2018–19	**2**	Liga II	12th		Fourth round
2017–18	**2**	Liga II	11th		Third round
2016–17	**3**	Liga III	**1st (C, P)**	Promoted	
2015–16	**4**	Liga IV (TM)	**1st (C, P)**	Promoted	Round of 32
2014–15	**4**	Liga IV (TM)	2nd	County cup winners	
2013–14	**5**	Liga V (TM)	**1st (C, P)**	Promoted	Round of 16
2012–13	**6**	Liga VI (TM)	**1st (C, P)**	Promoted	County winner
1948–2012	Not active				
1947–48	**2**	Divizia B (Series III)	**8th (R)**	Dissolved	Round of 32
1946–47	**3**	Divizia C (Series V-B)	**1st (C, P)**	Promoted	—
1944–46	Not active due to World War II				
1943–44	—	Cupa Eroilor (Series I)	7th	Wartime	Abandoned
1942–43	—	Cupa Eroilor (Series I)	4th	Wartime	Round of 32
1941–42	—	Cupa Basarabiei (Timișoara)	—	Wartime	Quarter-finals
1940–41	**1**	Divizia A	3rd		Round of 32
1939–40	**1**	Divizia A	6th		Round of 32
1938–39	**1**	Divizia A	2nd		Round of 32
1937–38	**1**	Divizia A (Group II)	**1st (C)**	Champions	Round of 32
1936–37	**1**	Divizia A	3rd		Final
1935–36	**1**	Divizia A	**1st (C)**	Champions	**Winners**
1934–35	**1**	Divizia A	**1st (C)**	Champions	Final
1933–34	**1**	Divizia A (Group II)	**2nd**	Runners-up	**Winners**
1932–33	**1**	Divizia A (Group I)	**1st (C)**	Champions	—
1928–32	—	—	—	Friendlies only	—

Champions, promotions or cup winners
Runners-up
Third place
Relegated

== European record ==
=== Mitropa Cup ===
Ripensia played in the Mitropa Cup, an important inter-war football competition. In the 1938 season Ripensia knocked Italian giants AC Milan out of this competition. The Romanians won the first leg 3–0 at Bucharest, and lost the second leg 1–3. In the next round Ripensia was eliminated by Hungarian side of Ferencváros (1–4, 4–5).

Ripensia participated in the Mitropa Cup, one of the most important European club competitions of the interwar period. In the 1938 edition, the club eliminated Italian side AC Milan in the first round, winning 4–3 on aggregate. Ripensia was subsequently eliminated in the quarter-finals by eventual champions Ferencváros, losing 5–9 on aggregate.

Season	Competition	Round	Country	Opponent	Home	Away	Aggregate
1938	Mitropa Cup	First round	Italy	Milano	**3–0**	1–3	**4–3**
1938	Mitropa Cup	Quarter-finals	Hungary	Ferencváros	4–5	1–4	5–9
