= 1941–42 Cupa României =

Tournament details
- Country: Romania

Final positions
- Champions: Rapid București
- Runners-up: Universitatea Cluj-Sibiu

The 1941–42 Cupa României was the ninth edition of Romania's most prestigious football cup competition.

The title was won by Rapid București against Universitatea Cluj-Sibiu.

== Format ==
The competition is an annual knockout tournament with pairings for each round drawn at random.

There are no seeds for the draw. The draw also determines which teams will play at home. Each tie is played as a single leg.

If a match is drawn after 90 minutes, the game goes in extra time, and if the scored is still tight after 120 minutes, there a replay will be played, usually at the ground of the team who were away for the first game.

The format is quite similar to the oldest recognised football tournament in the world, the FA Cup.

This season, due to World War II, no official editions of Divizia A, Divizia B or Divizia C were played. Another Cup Competition was played instead called 1942 Heroes Cup.

== First round proper ==
Team 1	Score	Team 2
14 May 1942
Carmen București	3–1	FC Brăila
Minerul Lupeni	5–1	UM Cugir
CAM Timișoara	2–1	CFR Timişoara
Electrica Timișoara	4–3	Crişana CFR Arad
CFR Turnu Severin	7–0	Oltul Turnu Măgurele
21 May 1942
UA Braşov	1–4	Universitatea Cluj-Sibiu
Gloria CFR Galați	2–0	FC Ploiești
24 May 1942
Monitorul Oficial București	2–1 (a.e.t.)	Vulturul de Mare București

- 8 Teams Bye to Second round proper: Unirea Tricolor București, Venus București, Sportul Studențesc București, Juventus București, Rapid București, Ripensia Timișoara, Gloria Arad, Mica Brad

== Second round proper ==
Team 1	Score	Team 2
24 May 1942
Gloria CFR Galați	0–1	Unirea Tricolor București
Universitatea Cluj-Sibiu	2–1	Juventus București
CFR Turnu Severin	0–1	Rapid București
25 May 1942
Venus București	3–1	Sportul Studențesc București
31 May 1942
Mica Brad	3–1	Minerul Lupeni
Monitorul Oficial București	0–6	Carmen București
CAM Timișoara	7–1	Gloria Arad
Electrica Timișoara	0–4	Ripensia Timișoara

== Quarter-finals ==
Team 1	Score	Team 2
28 June 1942
Mica Brad	2–1	Ripensia Timişoara
Venus București	4–2 (a.e.t.)	Carmen București
CAM Timișoara	2–5	Universitatea Cluj-Sibiu
Rapid București	2–2	Unirea Tricolor București
17 July 1942 — Replay
Rapid București	1–0 (R)	Unirea Tricolor București

== Semi-finals ==
Team 1	Score	Team 2
19 July 1942
Rapid București	7–2	Venus București
Universitatea Cluj-Sibiu	4–1	Mica Brad

== Final ==
9 August 1942
17:00 EET

Rapid București	7–1	Universitatea Cluj-Sibiu
Florian 16'; Gavrilescu 47', 52', 86'; Moldoveanu 53'; Filotti 75', 77'	Report	Medrea III 63'

Venus, Bucharest
Attendance: 10,000
Referee: Mihail Petrescu (Bucharest)

Cupa României 1941–42 winners

7th title
