= 1940–41 Cupa României =

Tournament details
- Country: Romania

Final positions
- Champions: Rapid București
- Runners-up: Unirea Tricolor București

The 1940–41 Cupa României was the eighth edition of Romania's most prestigious football cup competition.

The trophy was won by Rapid București for the fifth time in a row and for the sixth time from eight editions played. They defeated Unirea Tricolor București. For Unirea Tricolor București it was the second final lost after the 1936 Cupa României Final.

The final was postponed several times by the organizers because of the uncertainty caused by the beginning of World War II. Finally, the last act was scheduled on 7 September 1941. The match ball is said to have been a Soviet football found in Tiraspol; after the game, the ball was after offered to the winners.

== Format ==
The competition is an annual knockout tournament with pairings for each round drawn at random.

There are no seeds for the draw. The draw also determines which teams will play at home. Each tie is played as a single leg.

If a match is drawn after 90 minutes, the game goes in extra time, and if the scored is still tight after 120 minutes, there a replay will be played, usually at the ground of the team who were away for the first game.

From the first edition, the teams from Divizia A entered in competition in sixteen finals, rule which remained till today.

The format is quite similar to the oldest recognised football tournament in the world, the FA Cup.

== First round proper ==
| Team 1 | Score | Team 2 |
|---|---|---|
16 October 1940
| Unirea Tricolor București (Div. A) | 3–2 | (District) Militari București |
| Rapid București (Div. A) | 4–3 | (District) Leonida București |
| Venus București (Div. A) | 4–2 | (District) CFR București Triaj |
27 October 1940
| Gloria CFR Galați (Div. A) | 3–0 (a.e.t.) | (Div. A) FC Brăila |
| Jiul Petroșani (Div. B) | 2–0 | (Div. A) UD Reșița |
| Astra Sportivă Metrom Brașov (District) | 1–7 | (Div. A) Sportul Studențesc București |
| Juventus București (Div. B) | 4–1 | (District) Socec Lafayette București |
| Rapid Timișoara (Div. B) | 5–2 | (Div. A) Gloria Arad |
| UM Cugir (District) | 5–2 | (Div. B) Chinezul Timișoara |
| Ateneul Tătărași (Div. B) | 5–10 (a.e.t.) | (Div. B) Franco-Româna Brăila |
| CFR Turnu Severin (Div. B) | 3–1 | (Div. A) FC Craiova |
| Metalosort Călan (Div. B) | 2–1 | (Div. A) Aurul Brad |
| AS Constanța (Div. B) | 2–3 | (Div. A) FC Ploiești |
| Carmen București (District) | 3–2 | (Div. B) Olympia București |
8 November 1940
| Crişana CFR Arad (Div. B) | 4–2 (a.e.t.) | (Div. A) Ripensia Timișoara |
| Electrica Timișoara (Div. B) | 2–1 | (Div. B) CFR Timișoara |

== Second round proper ==
| Team 1 | Score | Team 2 |
|---|---|---|
20 April 1941
| UM Cugir | 1–3 | Juventus București |
23 April 1941
| CFR Turnu Severin | 1–2 | Rapid Timișoara |
| Venus București | 3–2 (a.e.t.) | Sportul Studențesc București |
| FC Ploiești | 1–0 | Carmen București |
| Franco-Româna Brăila | 0–3 (a.e.t.) | Unirea Tricolor București |
| Gloria CFR Galați | 0–3 | Rapid București |
| Metalosort Călan | 3–0 (forfait) | Jiul Petroșani |
24 April 1941
| Crişana CFR Arad | 2–1 | Electrica Timișoara |

== Quarter-finals ==
| Team 1 | Score | Team 2 |
|---|---|---|
22 May 1941
| Rapid Timișoara | 4–0 | FC Ploiești |
25 May 1941
| Venus București | 3–0 | Crişana CFR Arad |
| Unirea Tricolor București | 6–0 | Metalosport Călan |
| Rapid București | 5–1 | Juventus București |

== Semi-finals ==
| Team 1 | Score | Team 2 |
|---|---|---|
11 June 1941
| Unirea Tricolor București | 4–1 | Rapid Timișoara |
| Rapid București | 4–2 | Venus București |

== Final ==
7 September 1941
16:00 EET

| Rapid București | 4–3 | Unirea Tricolor București |
|---|---|---|
| Florian 4'; Baratky 48'; Bogdan 49', 52' | Report | Criciotoiu 31' (pen.), 55', 75' |

ONEF, Bucharest
Attendance: 9,000
Referee: Mihail Petrescu (Bucharest)

Cupa României 1940–41 winners

6th title
