= Stadionul Republicii =

Former Romanian stadium

Coordinates: 44°25′42″N 26°4′55″E

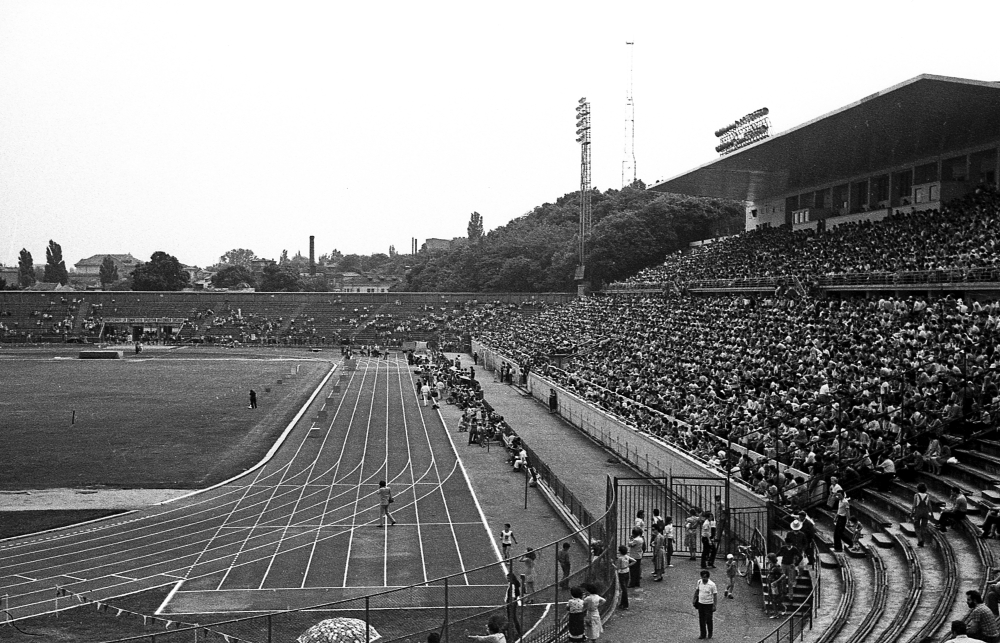
Stadionul Republicii in the early 1980s

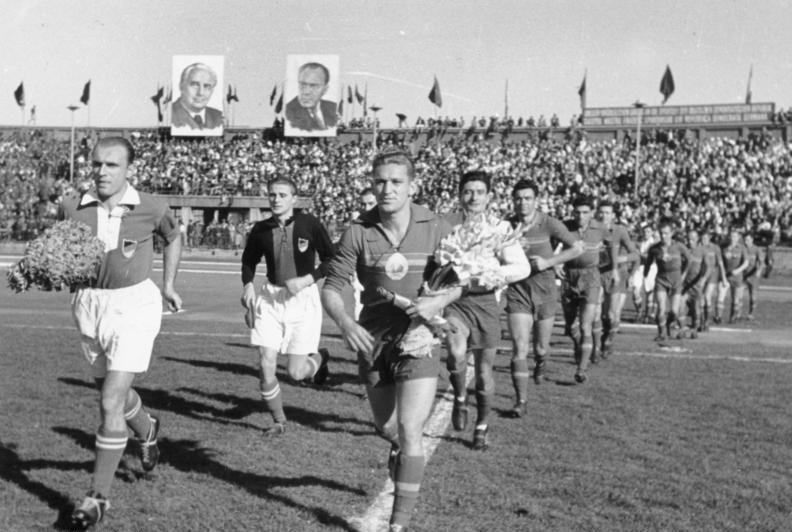
A friendly football match at Stadionul Republicii between Romania and East Germany, 26 October 1952

Stadionul Republicii (Romanian: [stadiˈonul reˈpublit͡ʃij], Stadium of the Republic) was a multi-use stadium in Bucharest, Romania.

It was used mostly for football matches. The stadium was able to hold 28,000 spectators and originally opened in 1926. It hosted 42 matches for the Romania national football team, 1 match for the Olympic National Team, 22 Romanian Football Cup finals and 15 European Cup matches.

The stadium was originally built in 1926 as the Stadionul Oficiul Național de Educație Fizică, or simply Stadionul ONEF, and inaugurated on 9 May 1926 with a rugby match against the French army. It was destroyed by fire and rebuilt under the name Stadionul Republicii in 1948.

It was located on Spirii Hill, the current location of the Palace of the Parliament. Since everything on the hill was cleared, including a former social high class and historic neighborhood, the stadium was demolished.

There were projects to move the National Football Stadium that would host a UEFA Europa League final to the same location, but those failed when the city's town hall decided to demolish the Stadionul Național and build a new one.
