= Cupa României =

Romanian association football tournament

- Organiser(s): Romanian Football Federation
- Founded: 1933; 93 years ago
- Region: Romania
- Teams: 202
- Qualifier for: UEFA Europa League
- Domestic cup: Supercupa României
- Current champions: Universitatea Craiova (8th cup)
- Most championships: Steaua (21 cups)/FCSB (24 cups) (disputed) (Note: Subject to legal challenge: see Steaua București football records dispute)
- Broadcaster(s): Digi Sport; Prima Sport
- Website: cuparomaniei.frf.ro
- 2026–27 Cupa României

The Cupa României (English: Romanian Cup) is a football cup competition for Romanian teams which has been held annually since 1933–34, except during World War II. It is the country's main cup competition and is open to all clubs affiliated with the Romanian Football Federation (FRF) and the county football associations, regardless of the league in which they compete. The winner of the competition qualifies for the UEFA Europa League qualifying rounds and faces the league champion in the Supercupa României.

The Romanian Cup is widely known for its knockout format and the possibility of surprising results, with lower-division teams occasionally eliminating top-flight clubs. Over the decades, the competition has produced many memorable finals and dramatic matches decided in extra time or on penalties, contributing to its reputation as one of the most unpredictable competitions in Romanian football.

Most finals have historically been held in Bucharest, particularly at the Stadionul Național (formerly known as "23 August"). In recent decades the final has occasionally been hosted in other major cities across the country. During the construction of the new Stadionul Național, the final was staged each year in a different city. In 2007, the final was held in Timișoara at the Dan Păltinișanu stadium, only the second time the event had taken place outside Bucharest after Brașov hosted the 1989 final. In the following years, finals were also staged in cities such as Piatra Neamț, Târgu Jiu, Iași and again in Brașov, before several editions returned to Bucharest following the opening of the Arena Națională.

Historically, the competition has been dominated by clubs from Bucharest. According to the official records of the Romanian Football Federation, the most successful club in the history of the competition is Steaua București with 23 trophies, followed by Rapid București and Dinamo București with 13 trophies each. Court decisions in Romania regarding the legal dispute between CSA Steaua București and FCSB established that the historical honours of Steaua București up to 1998 belong to the CSA Steaua sports club. As a result, the Romanian Cup trophies won by the club before that date are officially attributed to Steaua București in FRF records.

One of the most remarkable achievements in the competition’s history belongs to Rapid București, which won the Romanian Cup six consecutive times between 1937 and 1942, a record that still stands today.

== Sponsorship ==
Former logo between 2006 and 2016

On 22 July 2005, FRF and Samsung Electronics signed a one-year sponsorship deal. The name of the competition was changed to Cupa României Samsung.

On 9 October 2006, FRF and Ursus Breweries (part of the SABMiller group) signed a sponsorship agreement for the next three seasons. Ursus Breweries changed the name of the competition to Cupa României Timișoreana, after the Timișoreana beer brand.

On 16 May 2016, FRF announced the rebranding of competition and the signing of contracts with new sponsors such as Kaufland, UPC Broadband and Stanleybet.

On 20 October 2017, FRF announced that the new main sponsor of the competition is the betting company Casa Pariurilor.

== Competition format ==
The competition has undergone minor changes in format over the years. The following format came in use in the 2009–10 season. The main differences between the current system and the last one are the dates at which rounds take place, and the two-legged format of the semifinals.

=== County phase ===
The competition at this phase is organized by the county football associations. Forty-two teams (one from each county) advance to the next phase.

=== National phase ===
The competition at this phase is organized by the Romanian Football Federation (FRF). For the first five rounds, teams are paired using geographical criteria in order to avoid long travel distances. The teams from a lower division or with a lower ranking in the last league season host the games.

- First round – 140 teams (42 teams qualified from the county phase and 98 Liga III teams)
- Second round – 80 teams (70 winners from the first round and the remaining 10 Liga III teams)
- Third round – 40 teams (winners from the second round)
- Fourth round – 56 teams (20 winners from the third round and all 36 Liga II teams)
- Fifth round – 28 teams (winners from the fourth round)
- Round of 32 – (14 winners from the fifth round and all 18 Liga I teams)

Starting with this round a seeding system is used for the draw, as follows:

  - Pot A: Teams 1–6 from last season's Liga I final table (6 teams)
  - Pot B: The remaining Liga I teams (12 teams)
  - Pot C: Teams from the lower divisions (14 teams)

Teams from pot A are paired with teams from pot C, then the eight remaining pot C teams are paired with pot B teams, with the lower league clubs hosting the games. The four remaining pot B teams will play each other, with the host club determined by means of a draw.

- Round of 16 (winners from the Round of 32)
- Quarterfinals
- Semifinals
- Final

Every year, based on the national and international football calendar, FRF's executive committee may choose a two-leg or one-leg system for the round of 16, quarterfinals and semifinals. Games at these stages are, when played using a one-leg system, hosted by a neutral venue. The final is held at a pre-established venue, normally in Bucharest.

== Performances ==
=== Performance by club ===
Since its establishment, the Cupa României has been won by 23 clubs. Teams shown in italics are no longer in existence. Additionally, if two or more teams are tied with the same number of trophies, the one that achieved the performance first is ranked above the others.

Position	Club	Winners	Winning years	Runners-up	Runners-up years	Total appearances finals	Semi-final losses
1	Steaua București	21	1948–49, 1950, 1951, 1952, 1955, 1961–62, 1965–66, 1966–67, 1968–69, 1969–70, 1970–71, 1975–76, 1978–79, 1984–85, 1986–87, 1987–88, 1988–89, 1991–92, 1995–96, 1996–97, 1998–99	7	1953, 1963–64, 1976–77, 1979–80, 1983–84, 1985–86, 1989–90	28	9
2	Dinamo București	13	1958–59, 1963–64, 1967–68, 1981–82, 1983–84, 1985–86, 1989–90, 1999–00, 2000–01, 2002–03, 2003–04, 2004–05, 2011–12	9	1954, 1968–69, 1969–70, 1970–71, 1986–87, 1988–89, 2001–02, 2010–11, 2015–16	22	17
3	Rapid București	13	1934–35, 1936–37, 1937–38, 1938–39, 1939–40, 1940–41, 1941–42, 1971–72, 1974–75, 1997–98, 2001–02, 2005–06, 2006–07	6	1960–61, 1961–62, 1967–68, 1994–95, 1998–99, 2011–12	19	12
4	Universitatea Craiova	8	1976–77, 1977–78, 1980–81, 1982–83, 1990–91, 2017–18, 2020–21, 2025–26	2	1974–75, 1984–85	10	6
5	CFR Cluj	5	2007–08, 2008–09, 2009–10, 2015–16, 2024–25	1	2012–13	6	2
6	FCSB	3	2010–11, 2014–15, 2019–20	1	2013–14	4	1
6	Petrolul Ploiești	3	1962–63, 1994–95, 2012–13	1	1952	4	6
8	Politehnica Timișoara	2	1957–58, 1979–80	6	1973–74, 1980–81, 1982–83, 1991–92, 2006–07, 2008–09	8	2
9	Ripensia Timișoara	2	1933–34, 1935–36	2	1934–35, 1936–37	4	–
9	UTA Arad	2	1947–48, 1953	2	1950, 1965–66	4	2
11	Sepsi Sfântu Gheorghe	2	2021–22, 2022–23	1	2019–20	3	–
12	Universitatea Cluj	1	1964–65	6	1933–34, 1941–42, 1948–49, 2014–15, 2022–23, 2025–26	7	6
13	Progresul București	1	1959–60	4	1957–58, 1996–97, 2002–03, 2005–06	5	6
14	FC U Craiova 1948	1	1992–93	3	1993–94, 1997–98, 1999–00	4	4
14	Astra Giurgiu	1	2013–14	3	2016–17, 2018–19, 2020–21	4	3
16	Progresul Oradea	1	1956	1	1955	2	4
16	Jiul Petroșani	1	1973–74	1	1971–72	2	2
16	Gloria Bistrița	1	1993–94	1	1995–96	2	4
16	Voluntari	1	2016–17	1	2021–22	2	1
20	CFR Turnu Severin	1	1942–43	–	–	1	–
20	Metalul Reșița	1	1954	–	–	1	1
20	Arieșul Turda	1	1960–61	–	–	1	1
20	Chimia Râmnicu Vâlcea	1	1972–73	–	–	1	1
20	Viitorul Constanța	1	2018–19	–	–	1	1
20	Corvinul Hunedoara	1	2023–24	–	–	1	3
26	Sportul Studențesc București	–	–	3	1938–39, 1942–43, 1978–79	3	4
27	Unirea Tricolor București	–	–	2	1935–36, 1940–41	2	–
27	Baia Mare	–	–	2	1958–59, 1981–82	2	1
27	Oțelul Galați	–	–	2	2003–04, 2023–24	2	2
27	Hermannstadt	–	–	2	2017–18, 2024–25	2	–
31	CAM Timișoara	–	–	1	1937–38	1	1
31	Venus București	–	–	1	1939–40	1	6
31	CFR Timișoara	–	–	1	1947–48	1	1
31	Flacăra Mediaș	–	–	1	1951	1	2
31	Energia Câmpia Turzii	–	–	1	1956	1	–
31	Dinamo Obor București	–	–	1	1959–60	1	4
31	Siderurgistul Galați	–	–	1	1962–63	1	–
31	Dinamo Pitești	–	–	1	1964–65	1	9
31	Foresta Fălticeni	–	–	1	1966–67	1	–
31	Constructorul Galați	–	–	1	1972–73	1	–
31	CSU Galați	–	–	1	1975–76	1	–
31	Olimpia Satu Mare	–	–	1	1977–78	1	–
31	Bacău	–	–	1	1990–91	1	3
31	Dacia Unirea Brăila	–	–	1	1992–93	1	1
31	Rocar București	–	–	1	2000–01	1	–
31	Farul Constanța	–	–	1	2004–05	1	4
31	Unirea Urziceni	–	–	1	2007–08	1	–
31	Vaslui	–	–	1	2009–10	1	2

=== Performance by city ===
The following table sorts cities by the number of Cups won by local teams. Bucharest, hosting the three most decorated sides in the competition and having staged the majority of the Cup finals, is by far the most prolific city.

City	Cups	Winning clubs
Bucharest	51	Steaua/FCSB (24), Dinamo (13), Rapid (13), Progresul (1)
Craiova	9	Universitatea Craiova (8), FC U Craiova 1948 (1)
Cluj-Napoca	6	CFR (5), U Cluj (1)
Timișoara	4	Poli Timișoara (2), Ripensia (2)
Ploiești	3	Petrolul (3)
Arad	2	UTA (2)
Sfântu Gheorghe	2	Sepsi Sfântu Gheorghe (2)
Oradea	1	Club Atletic Oradea (1)
Petroșani	1	Jiul (1)
Bistrița	1	Gloria (1)
Drobeta-Turnu Severin	1	CFR Turnu Severin (1)
Reșița	1	Metalul (1)
Turda	1	Arieșul (1)
Râmnicu Vâlcea	1	Chimia (1)
Giurgiu	1	Astra (1)
Voluntari	1	FC Voluntari (1)
Constanța	1	Viitorul (1)

Map of Romania with the cities/towns of the Romanian Cup winners marked.
Cities/towns with eleven or more Romanian Cup wins.
Cities/towns with 2–10 wins.
Cities/towns with 1 win.

== List of stadiums in Cupa României ==
The following table lists the stadiums which have hosted at least one Cupa României final. When an edition required one or more replays at the same stadium, that stadium is counted only once for that edition.

No.	City	County	Appearances	Stadium
1	Bucharest	Bucharest	40	Stadionul 23 August / Stadionul Național — 1953, 1957–58, 1958–59, 1961–62, 1962–63, 1963–64, 1965–66, 1966–67, 1967–68, 1968–69, 1969–70, 1970–71, 1971–72, 1972–73, 1973–74, 1974–75, 1975–76, 1978–79, 1979–80, 1980–81, 1981–82, 1982–83, 1983–84, 1984–85, 1985–86, 1986–87, 1987–88, 1989–90, 1990–91, 1992–93, 1994–95, 1995–96, 1996–97, 1997–98, 1998–99, 1999–00, 2000–01, 2001–02, 2002–03, 2005–06
2	Bucharest	Bucharest	11	Stadionul Republicii — 1950, 1951, 1952, 1954, 1955, 1956, 1959–60, 1960–61, 1964–65, 1976–77, 1977–78
3	Bucharest	Bucharest	6	Stadionul ONEF — 1933–34, 1934–35, 1936–37, 1939–40, 1940–41, 1942–43
3	Bucharest	Bucharest	6	Arena Națională — 2011–12, 2012–13, 2013–14, 2014–15, 2015–16, 2017–18
5	Bucharest	Bucharest	4	Stadionul Venus — 1935–36, 1938–39, 1941–42, 1947–48
5	Ploiești	Prahova	4	Stadionul Ilie Oană — 2016–17, 2018–19, 2019–20, 2020–21
7	Sibiu	Sibiu	3	Stadionul Municipal — 2022–23, 2023–24, 2025–26
8	Bucharest	Bucharest	2	Stadionul Giulești — 1937–38, 1939–40
8	Bucharest	Bucharest	2	Stadionul Regie — 1991–92, 1993–94
8	Bucharest	Bucharest	2	Stadionul Cotroceni — 2003–04, 2004–05
11	Timișoara	Timiș	1	Stadionul Electrica — 1933–34
11	Bucharest	Bucharest	1	Stadionul ICAS — 1948–49
11	Brașov	Brașov	1	Stadionul Municipal — 1988–89
11	Timișoara	Timiș	1	Stadionul Dan Păltinișanu — 2006–07
11	Piatra Neamț	Neamț	1	Stadionul Ceahlăul — 2007–08
11	Târgu Jiu	Gorj	1	Stadionul Tudor Vladimirescu — 2008–09
11	Iași	Iași	1	Stadionul Emil Alexandrescu — 2009–10
11	Brașov	Brașov	1	Stadionul Silviu Ploeșteanu — 2010–11
11	Bucharest	Bucharest	1	Stadionul Rapid-Giulești — 2021–22
11	Arad	Arad	1	Stadionul Francisc von Neuman — 2024–25

Map of Romania with the cities that have hosted the Cupa României final marked.
City with 10 or more hosted editions.
Cities with 2–9 hosted editions.
Cities with 1 hosted edition.

=== Records ===
As of 23 August 2022

Top five goalscorers
Player		Club	Goals
1	(Romania) Florea Voinea	Steaua București, Prahova Ploiești	40
2	(Romania) Gyula Barátky	Rapid București, Crișana Oradea	37
3	(Romania) Ionel Dănciulescu	Electroputere Craiova, Dinamo București, Steaua București	35
4	(Romania) Ion Alecsandrescu	Steaua București, CA Câmpulung Moldovenesc	34
5	(Romania) Ștefan Dobay	Ripensia Timișoara	33
