= 1965 Cupa României final =

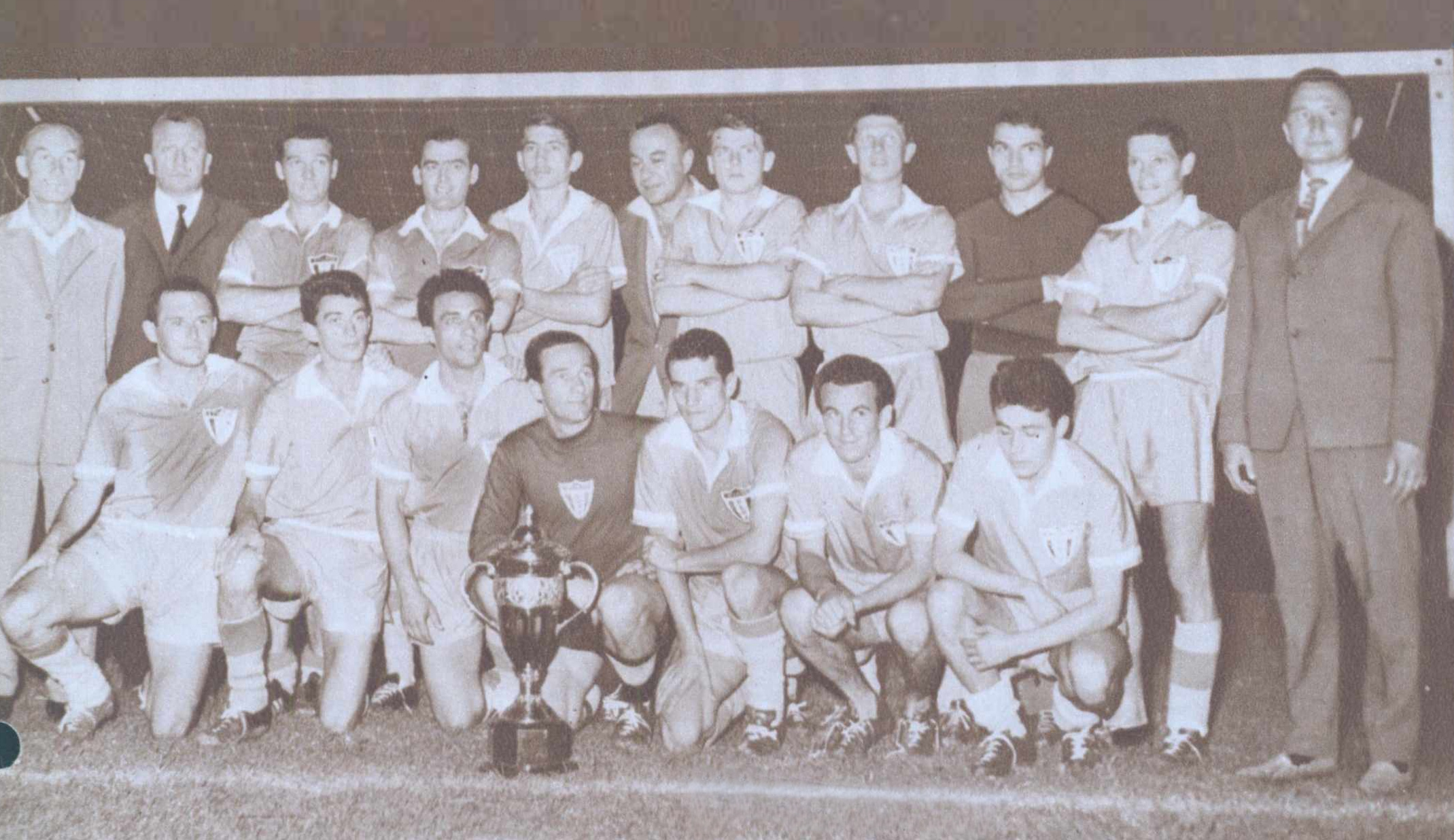
- Știința Cluj posing with the trophy
- Event: 1964–65 Cupa României
Știința Cluj	Dinamo Pitești
2	1
- Date: 11 July 1965
- Venue: Republicii, Bucharest
- Referee: Nicolae Mihăilescu (Bucharest)
- Attendance: 30,000

The 1965 Cupa României final was the 27th final of Romania's most prestigious football cup competition. It was disputed between Știința Cluj and Dinamo Pitești and was won by Știința after a game with three goals. It was the first cup for Știința Cluj.

== Match details ==
11 July 1965
17:30 EET

Știința Cluj	2–1	Dinamo Pitești
Câmpeanu 11'; Ivansuc 55'	Report	Țurcan 65'

Republicii, Bucharest
Attendance: 30,000
Referee: Nicolae Mihăilescu (Bucharest)

GK	1	(Romania) Simion Moguț
DF	2	(Romania) Paul Marcu
DF	3	(Romania) Traian Georgescu
DF	4	(Romania) Paul Grăjdeanu
DF	5	(Romania) Remus Câmpeanu
MF	6	(Romania) Vasile Alexandru
MF	7	(Romania) Mircea Neșu
FW	8	(Romania) Nicolae Szabo
FW	9	(Romania) Zoltán Ivansuc
FW	10	(Romania) Mihai Adam
FW	11	(Romania) Ioan Suciu
Manager:
(Romania) Andrei Sepci

GK	1	(Romania) Spiridon Niculescu (substituted off) 17'
DF	2	(Romania) Gheorghe Radu
DF	3	(Romania) Mircea Stoenescu
DF	4	(Romania) Ilie Stelian
DF	5	(Romania) Constantin Badea
MF	6	(Romania) Ion Țîrcovnicu
MF	7	(Romania) Nicolae Dobrin (substituted off) 62'
FW	8	(Romania) Constantin Ionescu
FW	9	(Romania) Mihai Țurcan
FW	10	(Romania) Nicolae Nagy
FW	11	(Romania) Constantin David
Substitutions:
GK	12	(Romania) Constantin Matache (substituted in) 17'
MF	13	(Romania) Ștefan Zimer (substituted in) 62'
Manager:
(Romania) Vintilă Mărdărescu

== See also ==
- List of Cupa României finals
