= Mihai Adam =

Romanian footballer

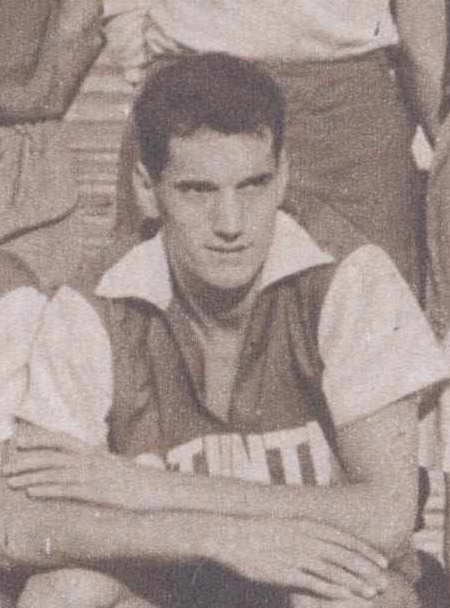
- Adam with Universitatea Cluj in 1963.

Personal information
- Date of birth: 3 July 1940
- Place of birth: Câmpia Turzii, Romania
- Date of death: 11 December 2015 (aged 75)
- Place of death: Cluj-Napoca, Romania
- Height: 1.79 m (5 ft 10 in)
- Position: Striker

Youth career
- 1956–1959: Industria Sârmei Câmpia Turzii

Senior career*
Years	Team	Apps	(Gls)
1959–1962	Industria Sârmei Câmpia Turzii		
1962–1972	Universitatea Cluj	226	(107)
1968–1969	→ Vagonul Arad (loan)	13	(6)
1972–1976	CFR Cluj	114	(47)
Total		353	(160)

International career
1963–1964	Romania U23	7	(3)
1965	Romania B	1	(0)
- * Club domestic league appearances and goals

Mihai Adam (3 July 1940 – 11 December 2015) was a Romanian football player who played as a striker.

== Club career ==
"He was among the greatest strikers in the history of our football, an extremely modest and serious man"

— Remus Câmpeanu, former teammate of Mihai Adam at "U" Cluj

Adam, the 11th child of his parents, was born on 3 July 1940 in Câmpia Turzii, Romania, and began playing football in 1956 for local club Industria Sârmei. In 1962, he was transferred to Universitatea Cluj, where on 19 August he made his Divizia A debut under coach Constantin Rădulescu in a 2–1 home victory against Politehnica Timișoara. In the 1964–65 Divizia A season, Adam who partnered with Zoltán Ivansuc in the team's attack, won the top-scorer of the season title for the first time, netting 18 goals. He also helped the club win the Cupa României, having been used by coach Andrei Sepci in the entire game of the 2–1 victory in the final against Argeș Pitești.

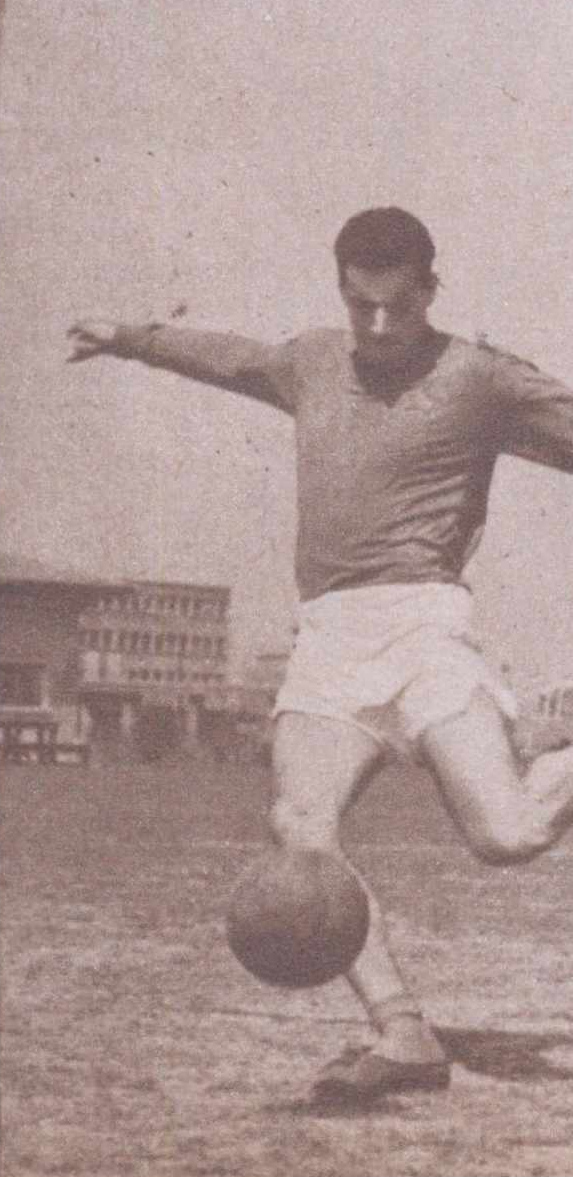
Mihai Adam in 1963.

Subsequently, Adam played four games in the 1965–66 European Cup Winners' Cup, scoring one goal which helped "U" Cluj eliminate Austrian team Wiener Neustadt in the first round, being eliminated in the following round by Atlético Madrid. In the 1967–68 season he scored 15 goals in 26 league appearances, winning his second top-scorer title, seven of these being scored in two victories over Dinamo București. In the next season he was selected to do his military service in Arad, so he played for local club Vagonul. Afterwards he returned to play for three more seasons at "U" Cluj. In the last one, Adam scored 10 goals which helped the club finish in third position.

Then he was transferred to CFR Cluj in exchange for Vasile Șoo, where he reunited with coach Constantin Rădulescu and scored the decisive goal in the 2–1 Cluj derby win against Universitatea three weeks after his transfer. In the 1973–74 season, he won the top-scorer title for the third and final time, scoring a personal record of 23 goals, while the team netted a total of 40. That performance helped them avoid relegation, as they finished in 14th position out of 18 teams. Adam scored nine goals in 25 appearances in his last season, but he couldn't prevent CFR from being relegated this time. His last Divizia A appearance was on 20 June 1976 in CFR's 1–0 loss to Steaua București, totaling 353 matches with 160 goals in the competition.

== International career ==
Between 1963 and 1965, Adam made several appearances for Romania's under-23 and B teams. However, he never played for Romania's senior team and on 13 May 2020, Gazeta Sporturilor included him in a first XI of best Romanian players who never played for the senior national team.

== Refereeing career ==
After he ended his playing career, Adam became a referee, officiating games including in Romania's top-league, Divizia A.

== Death ==
In the last years of his life, he lived in Cluj-Napoca, suffering from Alzheimer's disease, and died on 11 December 2015 at age 75. The Mihai Adam Stadium in Câmpia Turzii is named in his honor.

== Honours ==
=== Club ===
Universitatea Cluj

- Cupa României: 1964–65

=== Individual ===
- Divizia A top-scorer: 1965, 1968, 1974
