= Paul Marcu =

Romanian footballer

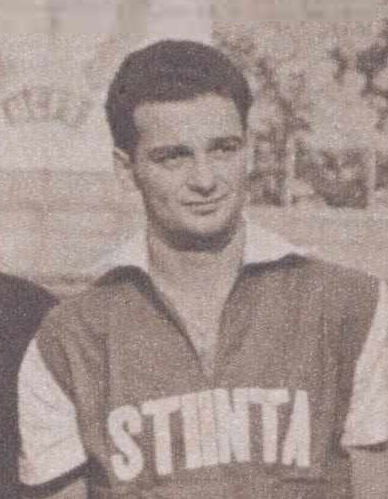

Personal information
- Date of birth: 2 June 1939
- Place of birth: Bucharest, Romania
- Date of death: 26 March 2004 (aged 64)
- Height: 1.80 m (5 ft 11 in)
- Positions: Forward; right back

Youth career
- 1953–1955: Progresul Bistrița

Senior career*
Years	Team	Apps	(Gls)
1955–1958	Progresul Bistrița		
1958–1967	Universitatea Cluj	212	(48)

International career
1961	Romania B	1	(0)
1961–1962	Romania U23	2	(1)
1966	Romania	1	(0)
- * Club domestic league appearances and goals

Paul Marcu (also known as Pavel Marcu; 2 June 1939 – 26 March 2004) was a Romanian international footballer who played as a right defender.

== Club career ==
"Paul was a child of Cluj and of Universitatea—first an adolescent, then a senior-ranking officer. He was a colleague who demonstrated incredible devotion to everything that "U" and the city of Cluj represent."

— Remus Câmpeanu, former Universitatea teammate.

Marcu was born on 2 June 1939 in Bucharest, Romania. He began playing football at Progresul Bistrița. In the summer of 1958, he joined Universitatea Cluj, making his Divizia A debut under coach Virgil Mărdărescu on 21 September in a 1–1 draw against FCM Bacău. He scored his first goal in the competition against UTA Arad. Until the end of the season, he also scored a brace in a 2–0 victory against Jiul Petroșani. In the first round of the following season, Marcu scored another brace in a 2–1 win over Dinamo București. In the 1960–61 season, he scored the winning goal in a 2–1 victory against CCA București, and also netted a brace in a 4–1 win over Minerul Lupeni.

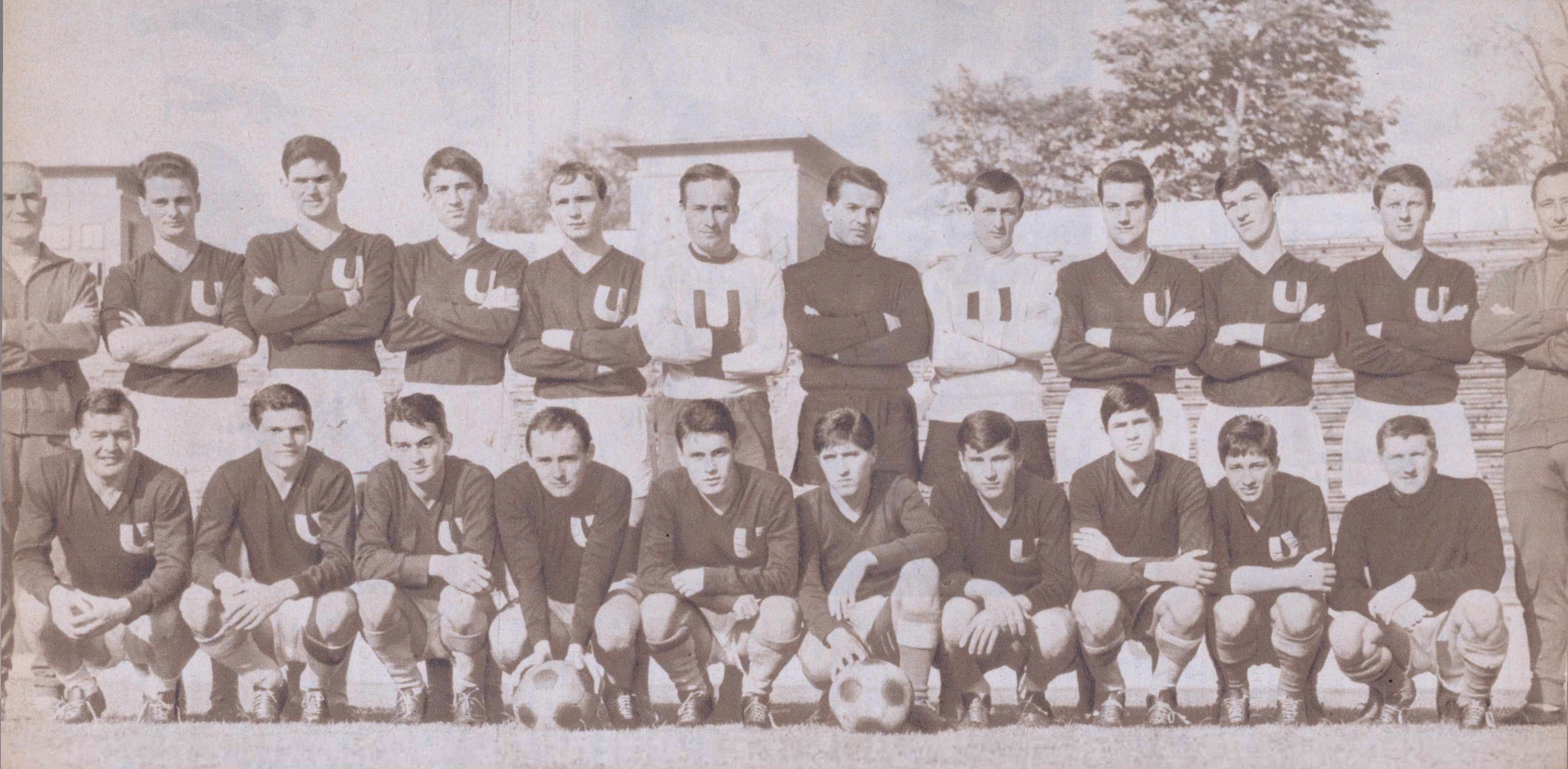
Marcu (standing, second from the left) with "U" Cluj in 1966

Marcu helped Universitatea win the 1964–65 Cupa României, playing the entire game under coach Andrei Sepci in the 2–1 victory in the final against Argeș Pitești. In the following season, he played four games in the 1965–66 European Cup Winners' Cup, helping "U" Cluj eliminate Austrian team, Wiener Neustadt in the first round, before they were knocked out by Atlético Madrid in the next round. In 1966, "U" Cluj needed a new captain, and the players had to choose between Marcu and Remus Câmpeanu. Marcu earned 18 votes and Câmpeanu just one. However, Marcu refused to take the position and Câmpeanu eventually became captain. Years after this event, Câmpeanu explained: "Everyone wanted Paul, he was a true leader. But he declined, citing his doctoral studies and the fact that his work took up so much of his time. He understood what it meant to be a team captain and knew he couldn't fully dedicate himself to the role. He was a man of extraordinary character, and I remain grateful to him to this day." Marcu made his last Divizia A appearance on 14 May 1967 in Universitatea's 2–0 win over Rapid București, totaling 212 matches with 48 goals in the competition.

== International career ==
From 1961 to 1962, Marcu played several matches for Romania's under-23 and B sides. He played one game for Romania on 3 July 1966, when coach Ilie Oană used him as a starter in a 1–0 friendly loss to Portugal played at Estádio do Futebol Clube do Porto.

== Style of play ==
His former teammate, Remus Câmpeanu, described Marcu's style of play: "A modern player who would also perform in today's football. Athletic, with a powerful shot and unbeatable aerial ability. He started out as a forward thanks to these qualities but was shifted to midfield and later to right-back—a time when football was evolving globally and wide defenders were becoming crucial to the attack. He was also part of the national squad and could have become a truly great player, yet he never neglected his profession; he was an exceptional chemist."

== Death ==
Marcu died on 26 March 2004 at the age of 64.

== Honours ==
Universitatea Cluj

- Cupa României: 1964–65
