= Imre Bíró (footballer) =

Romanian footballer (1958–2023)

Personal information
- Date of birth: 17 April 1958
- Place of birth: Porcești, Romania
- Date of death: 5 November 2023 (aged 65)
- Position: Forward

Senior career*
| Years | Team | Apps | (Gls) |
| 1977–1978 | Avântul Reghin | | |
| 1978–1983 | ASA Târgu Mureș | 163 | (41) |
| 1984–1985 | Politehnica Iași | 49 | (10) |
| 1985–1990 | Universitatea Cluj | 141 | (34) |
| 1990–1991 | Győri ETO | 13 | (1) |
| 1991 | Sopron | 2 | (0) |
| Total | | 368 | (86) |

International career
| 1978–1980 | Romania U21 | 4 | (0) |
| 1978 | Romania | 1 | (0) |
- * Club domestic league appearances and goals

Imre Bíró (17 April 1958 – 5 November 2023) was a Romanian footballer who played as a forward. He was capped once for Romania. (Note: Imre Bíró at National-Football-Teams.com)

== Club career ==
Bíró was born on 17 April 1958 in Porcești, Romania. He began playing football at Avântul Reghin during the 1977–78 Divizia B season. Subsequently, he joined ASA Târgu Mureș, making his Divizia A debut on 24 August 1978 under coach Tiberiu Bone in a 1–1 draw against Sportul Studențesc București. Bíró scored 10 goals until the end of the 1978–79 season. In 1983, he went to play for Politehnica Iași. He scored nine goals during the 1984–85 season, but could not avoid Politehnica's relegation to Divizia B. Afterwards, Bíró moved to Universitatea Cluj, where he scored a career-best 11 goals in the 1986–87 season. On 5 June 1990, he made his last Divizia A appearance in Universitatea's 1–0 loss to Argeș Pitești, totaling 353 matches with 85 goals in the competition. Bíró then moved to Hungary, joining Győri ETO. He made his Nemzeti Bajnokság I debut on 25 August 1990, when coach Karol Pecze sent him in the 73rd minute to replace Mörtel Béla in a 2–1 win over Pécs. He scored his first goal in the competition on 6 April 1991 in a 1–1 draw against Váci Izzó. Bíró ended his career after making two appearances for Sopron in the first half of the 1991–92 Nemzeti Bajnokság II season.

== International career ==
From 1978 to 1980, Bíró played four matches for Romania's under-21 national team.

Bíró played one game for Romania on 11 October 1978 under coach Ștefan Kovács in a 1–0 friendly victory against Poland.

== Death ==
Bíró died on 5 November 2023 at the age of 65.
