= Mihai Țurcan =

Mihai Țurcan may refer to:

- Mihai Țurcan (footballer, born 1941), Romanian footballer
- Mihai Țurcan (footballer, born 1989), Moldovan footballer
