= Ioan Suciu (footballer) =

Romanian footballer (1933–2018)

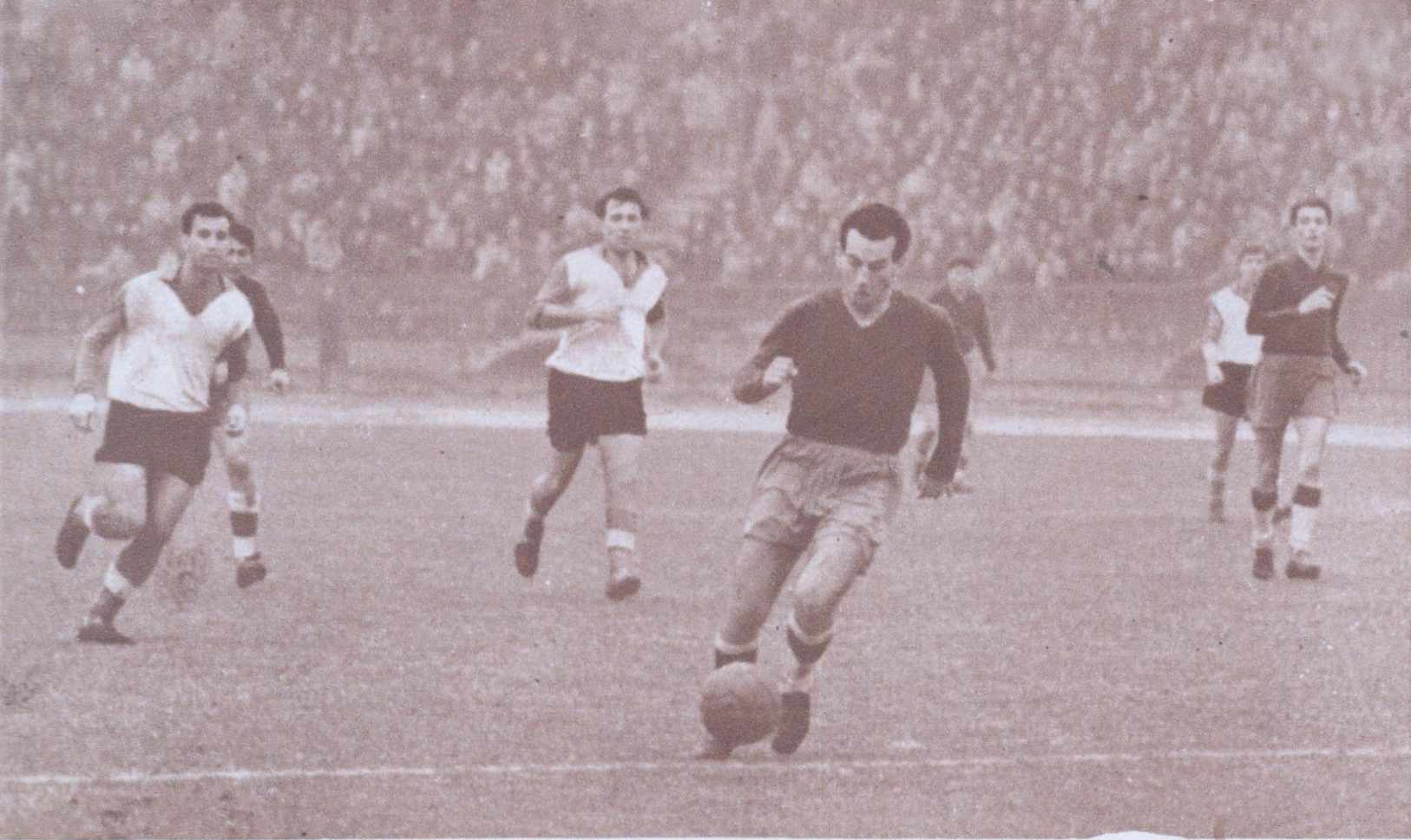

Personal information
- Date of birth: 30 November 1933
- Place of birth: Romania
- Date of death: 10 April 2018 (aged 84)
- Height: 1.70 m (5 ft 7 in)
- Position: Midfielder

Youth career
- CFR Cluj

Senior career*
Years	Team	Apps	(Gls)
1950–1954	CFR Cluj		
1954–1966	Universitatea Cluj	222	(25)

International career
1954–1955	Romania B	2	(0)
1955–1956	Romania	2	(0)
- * Club domestic league appearances and goals

Ioan Suciu (30 November 1933 – 10 April 2018) was a Romanian international footballer who played as a midfielder.

== International career ==
Suciu played two friendly games for Romania, making his debut in 1955 when coach Gheorghe Popescu I used him as a starter in a match against Poland which ended 2–2. His second game was a 2–0 loss against Sweden.

== Honours ==
Universitatea Cluj

- Divizia B: 1957–58
- Cupa României: 1964–65
