= Mircea Neșu =

Romanian footballer

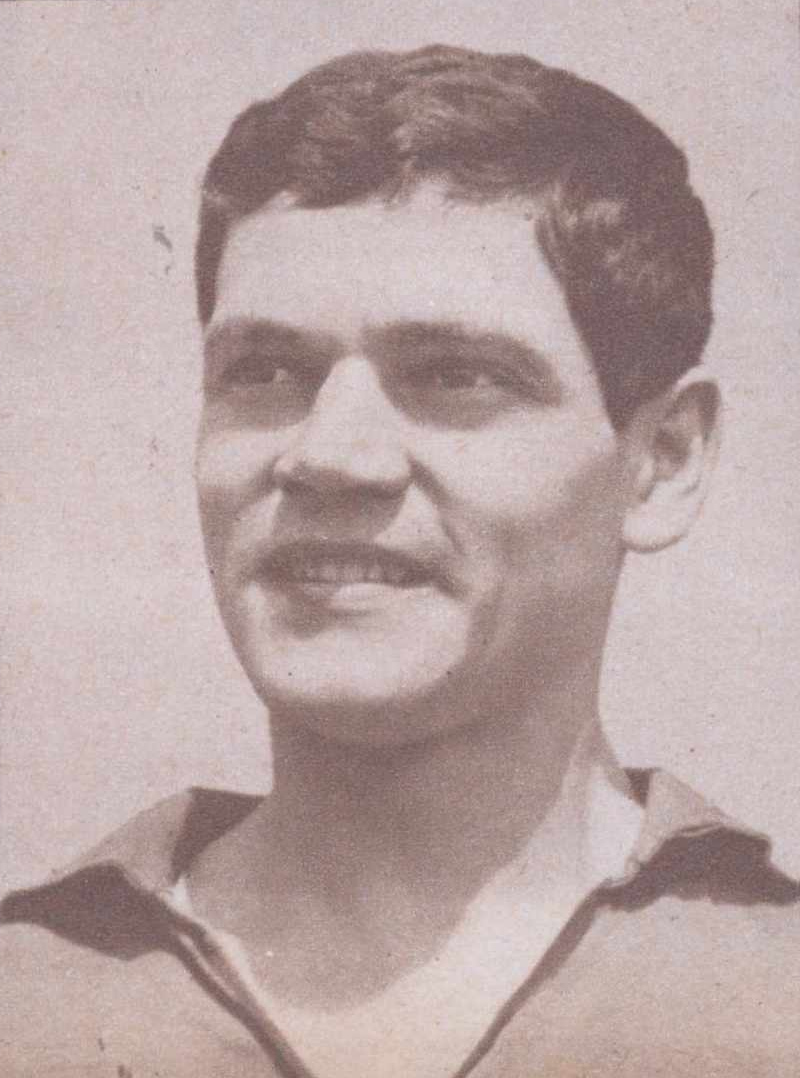
- Neșu in 1963

Personal information
- Date of birth: 29 September 1940
- Place of birth: Cacica, Romania
- Date of death: 20 October 2014 (aged 74)
- Place of death: Oradea, Romania
- Height: 1.73 m (5 ft 8 in)
- Position: Midfielder

Youth career
- 1954–1958: CS Oradea

Senior career*
Years	Team	Apps	(Gls)
1958–1962	Crișana Oradea	33	(2)
1962	Viitorul București		
1964–1970	Universitatea Cluj	99	(5)
1970–1972	Crișul Oradea	42	(0)
Total		174	(7)

International career
1962–1965	Romania U23	7	(0)
- * Club domestic league appearances and goals as of 31 December 2019

Dr. Mircea Neșu (29 September 1940 – 20 October 2014) was a Romanian footballer who played as a midfielder.

== Career ==
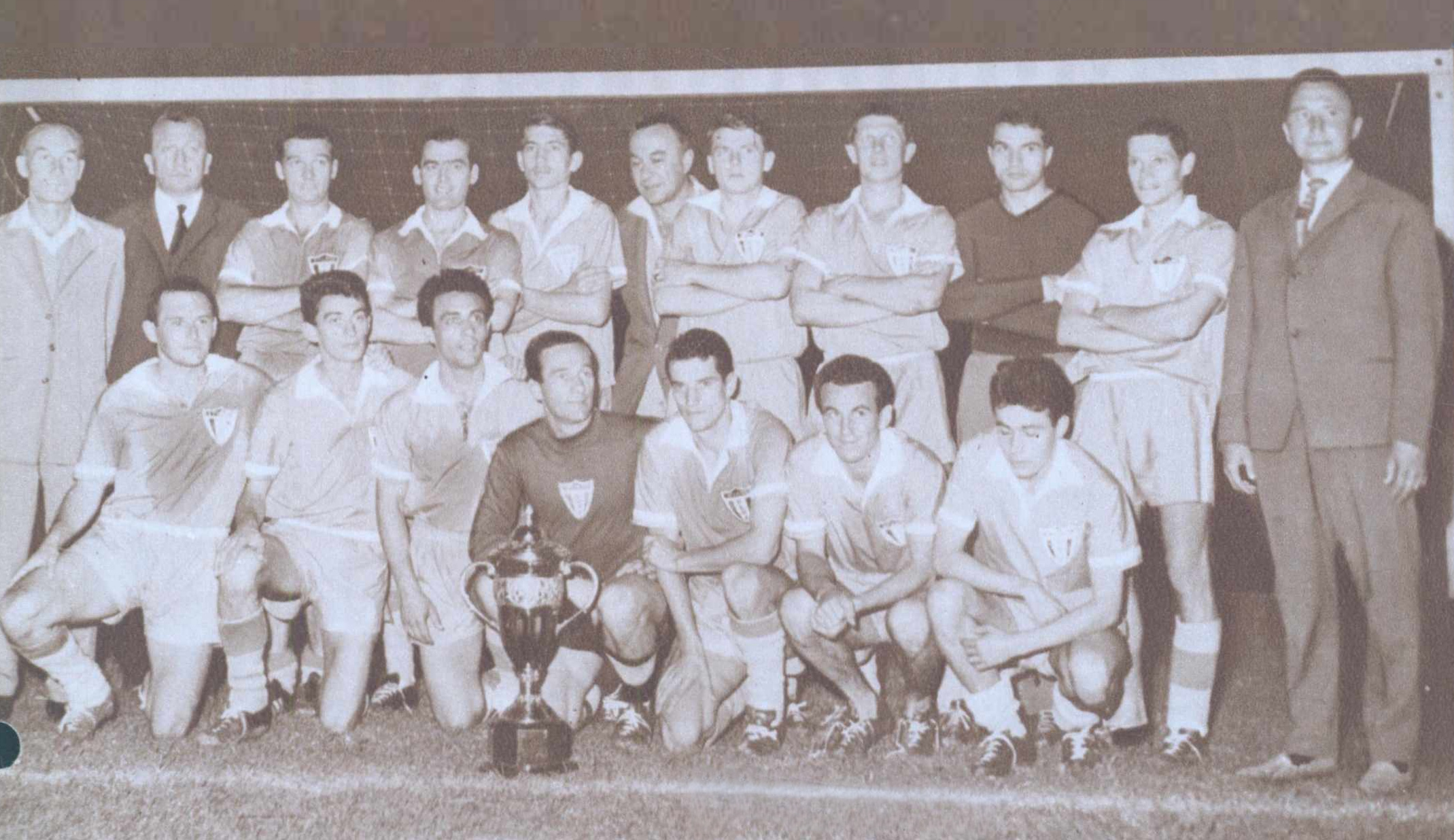
Neșu (back row, second from right) with Știința Cluj in 1965.

Mircea Neșu played for Crișana Oradea, Viitorul București, Universitatea Cluj and Crișul Oradea, having earned 145 matches and 5 goals in the Romanian top-league Divizia A. He played 99 Divizia A matches, scoring five goals for Universitatea Cluj, a team with which he also won the only trophy in his career, the 1964–65 Cupa României. After he ended his playing career he became a referee who arbitrated Divizia A and Divizia B matches during 1978–1986. He also arbitrated at international and European club level.

In 1992, Neșu was Romanian Democratic Convention's candidate for mayor of Oradea, but he lost the elections to Petru Filip. He also worked as a doctor. His son, Mihai Neșu and grandson Nikos Barboudis were also footballers.

== Honours ==
Crișana Oradea

- Divizia B: 1961–62

Universitatea Cluj

- Cupa României: 1964–65

Crișul Oradea

- Divizia B: 1970–71
