= Septimiu Câmpeanu =

Romanian footballer

Personal information
- Date of birth: 12 July 1957 (age 69)
- Place of birth: Cluj-Napoca, Romania
- Height: 1.89 m (6 ft 2 in)
- Position: Forward

Youth career
- 1970–1974: Universitatea Cluj

Senior career*
Years	Team	Apps	(Gls)
1974–1982	Universitatea Cluj	234	(102)
1982–1984	Steaua București	57	(21)
1984–1988	Universitatea Cluj	111	(47)
1988	VfB 06 Langenfeld		
1989	Düsseldorfer SV 04		
1990–1991	SV Wersten 04		
Total		402	(170)

International career
1979–1982	Romania B	2	(1)
1981–1987	Romania	4	(1)

Managerial career
- 1999–2001: Fortuna Düsseldorf youth
- 2000: Fortuna Düsseldorf (caretaker)
- 2001–2002: Fortuna Düsseldorf
- 2001: Fortuna Düsseldorf II (caretaker)
- 2004–2006: Ratingen 04/19
- 2006–2007: Fortuna Düsseldorf U17
- 2011–2012: SV Rosellen
- * Club domestic league appearances and goals

Septimiu Câmpeanu (also known as Tim Câmpeanu and in Germany as Tim Kamp; born 12 July 1957) is a Romanian former football player and manager who played as a forward.

== Club career ==
"Tim was one of the great talents that the Romanian land gave and he was certainly the most fair-play footballer I knew. I am proud and happy to have been his colleague."

— Vasile Dobrău, former "U" Cluj teammate

Câmpeanu was born on 12 July 1957 in Cluj-Napoca, Romania and began playing junior-level football in 1970 at Universitatea Cluj. He made his Divizia A debut under coach Silviu Avram on 17 August 1974 at age 17 in Universitatea's 4–2 away loss to Steaua București. On 8 September, he scored his first goal in the competition in a 1–0 victory against Politehnica Iași. After two seasons, "U" Cluj were relegated to Divizia B, but Câmpeanu stayed with the club and helped it gain promotion back to Divizia A after three seasons by scoring 19 goals in 34 matches during the 1978–79 Divizia B season. In the following season, he netted a career-best 24 goals out of the team's 41, earning the Divizia A top-scorer title while building a reputation for his free-kick abilities.

In 1982, after "U" Cluj were relegated once again to Divizia B, Câmpeanu went to play for Steaua București where he spent two seasons, scoring 21 goals in the league. The club also reached the 1984 Cupa României final, where coach Emerich Jenei sent him in the 65th minute to replace Victor Pițurcă in the 2–1 loss to Dinamo București. He returned to Universitatea Cluj in the 1984–85 Divizia B season, helping it earn first place and promotion to Divizia A by the end of it, scoring 12 goals in 28 matches. Câmpeanu played three more seasons for The Red Caps in Divizia A, making his last appearance on 22 June 1988 in a 2–1 home victory against Oțelul Galați, totaling 277 games with 117 goals in the competition.

In 1988 he left Romania for West Germany as his wife was suffering from an illness and she could get adequate treatment there. Câmpeanu played for a few years at VfB 06 Langenfeld, Düsseldorfer SV 04 and SV Wersten 04, afterwards settling in Düsseldorf where for a while he worked at the junior center of local professional club, Fortuna. Known as Tim Kamp, he coached the first team from 9 April 2001 to 2 April 2002 in the Regionalliga Nord. Four years after leaving Fortuna's under-17 team, Kamp returned to manage ninth-tier SV Rosellen in January 2011. In April 2012, he became sporting director of SV Wersten 04.

== International career ==
From 1979 to 1982, Câmpeanu played two matches and scored one goal for Romania's B team.

Câmpeanu played four games for Romania, making his debut on 8 April 1981 when coach Valentin Stănescu sent him at half-time to replace Mircea Sandu in a 2–1 friendly loss to Israel. He also played in a 0–0 draw against Hungary in the 1982 World Cup qualifiers. In his last appearance for the national team, he managed to score his only goal in a 3–2 friendly victory against Israel.

== Personal life ==
He is the nephew of Remus Câmpeanu, a footballer who spent almost his entire career at Universitatea Cluj.

== Playing statistics ==
Scores and results list Romania's goal tally first, score column indicates score after each Câmpeanu goal.

#	Date	Venue	Opponent	Score	Result	Competition
1	8 April 1987	Stadionul Municipal, Brașov, Romania	Israel	1–1	3–2	Friendly

== Honours ==
=== Player ===
Universitatea Cluj

- Divizia B: 1978–79, 1984–85

Steaua București

- Cupa României runner-up: 1983–84

=== Individual ===
- Divizia A top scorer: 1979–80
