= Marius Predatu =

Romanian footballer

Personal information
- Date of birth: 15 August 1967 (age 59)
- Place of birth: Sibiu, Romania
- Position: Striker

Youth career
- Inter Sibiu

Senior career*
| Years | Team | Apps | (Gls) |
| 1989–1990 | Inter Sibiu | 40 | (6) |
| 1991–1992 | Argeș Pitești | 36 | (3) |
| 1992–1995 | Universitatea Cluj | 94 | (36) |
| 1995–1996 | Panionios | 28 | (8) |
| 1996 | Universitatea Cluj | 7 | (2) |
| 1997 | Gloria Bistrița | 20 | (10) |
| 1997–1999 | Universitatea Cluj | 40 | (7) |
| 1999–2000 | Gloria Bistrița | 16 | (3) |
| 2000–2001 | Universitatea Cluj | 10 | (3) |
| Total | | 291 | (78) |

International career
| 1991 | Romania B | 5 | (3) |
| 1993 | Romania | 1 | (0) |

Managerial career
- 2021: Arieșul Mihai Viteazu
- * Club domestic league appearances and goals

Marius Predatu (born 15 August 1967) is a Romanian former footballer who played as a striker.

== Club career ==
Predatu was born on 15 August 1967 in Sibiu, Romania and began playing junior-level football at local club Inter. In the 1989–90 season he started his senior career, playing 26 Divizia A games in which he scored six goals for Inter. In the middle of the following season he went to play for Argeș Pitești for one and a half years.

In 1992, Predatu signed with Universitatea Cluj, where in his first season under the guidance of coach Remus Vlad, he scored a personal record of 14 goals. Among these were four in a 5–0 win against Rapid București which earned him the nickname "Ïl Principe", and he also became a fan-favorite, the team's gallery chanting:Marius Predatu, va băga patru (Marius Predatu, will give four). In the following two seasons he appeared and scored regularly for "U". Subsequently, he went to play for the 1995–96 season in the Greek first league at Panionios, alongside fellow Romanians Marian Ivan and coach Emerich Jenei, scoring eight goals in 28 matches.

In 1997, Predatu returned for a short while at Universitatea Cluj, but spent the rest of the season at Gloria Bistrița. Afterwards he went for a third spell at "U" Cluj, staying two seasons. Then he signed for a second spell at Bistrița where he stayed one year, making his last Divizia A appearances, totaling 253 games with 67 goals in the competition.

In the 2000–01 season, Predatu played for the last time for Universitatea Cluj, on this occasion in Divizia C, under player-coach Ioan Sabău, helping the team win promotion to Divizia B.

== International career ==
In 1991, Predatu played five games and scored three goals for Romania's B side. He helped them win the Nehru Cup, where he played three matches, scoring one goal in a 3–0 win over India and a brace in a 2–1 victory against China.

Predatu played one game for Romania, when on 14 April 1993, coach Cornel Dinu sent him in the 64th minute to replace Gheorghe Ceaușilă in a 2–1 victory against Cyprus in the 1994 World Cup qualifiers.

== Coaching career ==
After he ended his playing career, Predatu worked as a youth coach for Universitatea Cluj. He coached the senior side of Arieșul Mihai Viteazu in the 2021–22 Liga IV season, but resigned after a loss in the first round.

== Honours ==
Universitatea Cluj

- Divizia C: 2000–01

Romania B

- Nehru Cup: 1991
