= Nicolae Bonciocat =

Romanian footballer

Personal information
- Date of birth: 13 April 1898
- Place of birth: Kolozsvár, Austria-Hungary
- Date of death: 22 March 1967 (aged 68)
- Position: Striker

Senior career*
Years	Team	Apps	(Gls)
1920–1927	Universitatea Cluj (Note: The statistics for the 1920–21 regional season are unavailable.)	82	(36)
1927–1928	România Cluj		

International career
1924–1925	Romania	2	(0)
- * Club domestic league appearances and goals

Nicolae Bonciocat (13 April 1898 – 22 March 1967) was a Romanian footballer. He competed in the men's tournament at the 1924 Summer Olympics.

== Club career ==
Bonciocat was born on 13 April 1898 in Kolozsvár, Austria-Hungary. He started playing football in the 1920–21 regional season at Universitatea Cluj. He was the team's top-scorer in the following two seasons with four goals netted in each, in the second one being tied with Aurel Guga. He won his first regional championship in the 1923–24 season which helped the team qualify to the national league where they were defeated by Clubul Atletic Oradea in the quarter-finals, with Bonciocat again being the team's top-scorer with six goals. In the following season he helped "U" win another regional title, being the team's top scorer with five goals but they got eliminated again in the quarter-finals, this time by UCAS Petroșani. In the 1925–26 season, Bonciocat scored a personal record of 14 goals as the team finished in second place. In his last season with "U" Cluj, Bonciocat scored three goals as the team won a third regional title, then got past AMEF Arad with a 3–0 win in the quarter-finals of the 1926–27 national league, but was defeated 2–1 in the semi-finals by eventual champions, Chinezul Timișoara.

Afterwards in 1927 he went to play for one season at România Cluj with whom he won another regional league, being eliminated in the quarter-finals of the national league with 2–0 by Jiul Lupeni.

== International career ==
Bonciocat made his debut for Romania's national team on 27 May 1924 when coach Adrian Suciu used him the entire match in a 6–0 loss to the Netherlands in the 1924 Summer Olympics. One year later, he played one more game, this time under coach Teofil Moraru, a friendly which ended with a 2–1 home loss to Turkey.

== Death ==
Bonciocat died on 22 March 1967, aged 68.
