= Alexa Uifăleanu =

Romanian footballer

Personal information
- Date of birth: 23 October 1947
- Place of birth: Giula, Borșa, Kingdom of Romania
- Date of death: 17 December 2013 (aged 66)
- Place of death: Cluj-Napoca, Romania
- Position: Midfielder

Youth career
- 1961–1965: CSȘ Cluj-Napoca

Senior career*
Years	Team	Apps	(Gls)
1965–1966	Clujeana Cluj		
1966–1979	Universitatea Cluj	256	(34)
1967–1968	→ CFR Cluj (loan)		
1979	→ CFR Cluj (loan)		

International career
1971	Romania U23	1	(0)

Managerial career
- 1983–1985: Universitatea Cluj (assistant)
- 1985: Universitatea Cluj
- 1985–1988: Universitatea Cluj (assistant)
- 1991–1993: Universitatea Cluj (assistant)
- 1999: Universitatea Cluj
- * Club domestic league appearances and goals

Alexa Uifăleanu (23 October 1947 – 17 December 2013) was a Romanian football player and coach who played as a midfielder.

== Managerial career ==
After retiring from his playing career in 1979 he worked as a coach at the Center for Children and Juniors at Universitatea Cluj until 2001 where he taught and formed generations of players, which include Ioan Sabău, Răzvan Cociș and George Florescu. He also worked as an assistant coach at Universitatea Cluj for a few years.

== Death ==
In 2001 he suffered a stroke which kept him in bed for the rest of his life.

== Honours ==
Universitatea Cluj

- Divizia B: 1978–79
