= Mihai Țurcan (footballer, born 1941) =

Romanian footballer

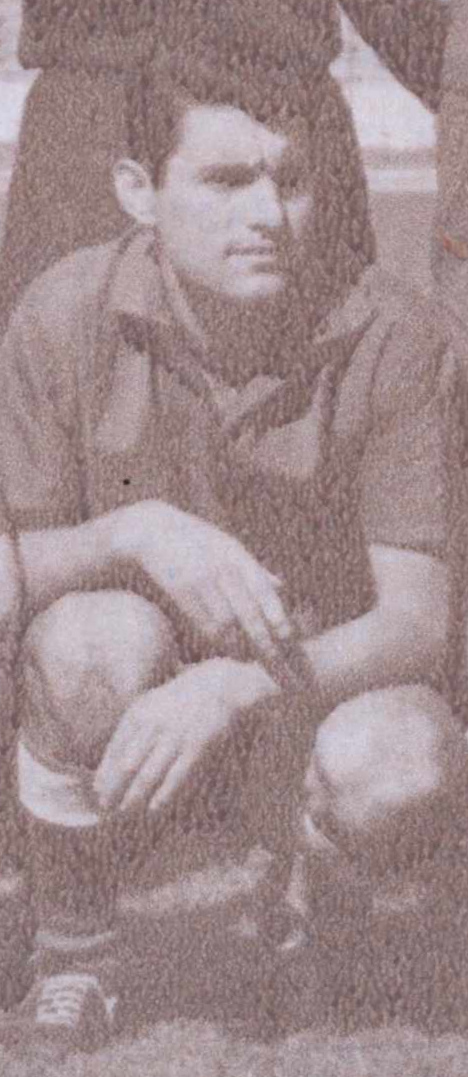

Personal information
- Date of birth: 4 October 1941 (age 85)
- Place of birth: Brezoi, Romania
- Position: Forward

Senior career*
Years	Team	Apps	(Gls)
1960–1961	Minerul Lupeni	34	(9)
1962–1964	Dinamo Pitești (Note: The statistics for the 1962–63 Divizia B season are unavailable.)	25	(4)
1964	Minerul Lupeni		
1965–1970	Argeș Pitești	85	(25)
1970	Jiul Petroșani	10	(1)
1971–1972	Chimia Râmnicu Vâlcea	8	(0)
Total		162	(39)
- * Club domestic league appearances and goals

Mihai Țurcan (born 4 October 1941) is a Romanian former football forward.

== Career ==
Țurcan was born on 4 October 1941 in Brezoi, Romania and began playing football at Minerul Lupeni. He made his Divizia A debut on 11 September 1960 under coach Vasile Lazăr in a 3–1 home win over Farul Constanța in which he scored two goals.

In the middle of the 1961–62 season he was transferred to Dinamo Pitești. The team was relegated at the end of the season, but Țurcan stayed with the club, helping it get promoted back after one year. In 1964 he made a short comeback to Minerul Lupeni, this time in Divizia B. Subsequently, he returned to Dinamo Pitești with whom he managed to reach the 1965 Cupa României final, being used by coach Virgil Mărdărescu the entire match in the 2–1 loss to Știința Cluj in which he scored his side's goal. In the 1965–66 season, he scored a personal record of nine goals in the league. He played six games in the 1966–67 Inter-Cities Fairs Cup, as in the first two rounds they eliminated Sevilla and Toulouse, Țurcan scoring once against the latter, being defeated in the third round with 1–0 on aggregate by Dinamo Zagreb who eventually won the competition.

In 1970, Țurcan joined Jiul Petroșani where on 6 December he made his last Divizia A appearance in a 3–1 home win over Progresul București, totaling 154 appearances with 39 goals in the competition and 10 games with one goal in the Inter-Cities Fairs Cup. He ended his career in 1972 after helping Chimia Râmnicu Vâlcea gain promotion from the third league to the second.

== Honours ==
Dinamo Pitești

- Divizia B: 1962–63
- Cupa României runner-up: 1964–65

Chimia Râmnicu Vâlcea

- Divizia C: 1970–71
