= Cristinel Pojar =

Romanian footballer

Personal information
- Full name: Cristinel Vasile Pojar
- Date of birth: 19 August 1967 (age 59)
- Place of birth: Jucu, Romania
- Height: 1.78 m (5 ft 10 in)
- Positions: Defender; defensive midfielder

Youth career
- –1984: Universitatea Cluj

Senior career*
Years	Team	Apps	(Gls)
1984–1998	Universitatea Cluj	194	(8)
Total		194	(8)

International career
1986	Romania U21	1	(0)

Managerial career
- 1998–1999: Universitatea Cluj (assistant)
- 2000–2001: Universitatea Cluj (assistant)
- 2002–2003: Politehnica Timișoara (assistant)
- 2003: Apulum Alba Iulia (assistant)
- 2003–2004: Universitatea Cluj (assistant)
- 2004–2005: Sportul Studențesc (assistant)
- 2005–2006: Wisła Kraków (assistant)
- 2006–2009: Unirea Urziceni (assistant)
- 2009–2012: Kuban Krasnodar (assistant)
- 2012–2014: Dynamo Moscow (assistant)
- 2021–2023: Universitatea Cluj (scouting director)
- * Club domestic league appearances and goals as of 1 January 2020

Cristinel Vasile Pojar (born 19 August 1967) is a Romanian former footballer who spent his entire career at Universitatea Cluj. After he ended his playing career he worked as an assistant coach.

== Club career ==
"Pojar never backed down, he always fought on the field, with all his strength. He was and remains a hard man"

— Remus Câmpeanu, former "U" Cluj president

Pojar was born on 19 August 1967 in Jucu, Cluj County, Romania and began playing junior-level football at Universitatea Cluj. He spent all of his senior career at "U", starting with the 1984–85 Divizia B season, as they finished it in first place. In the following season he made his Divizia A debut under coach Remus Vlad on 14 September 1985 in a 1–0 away loss to Universitatea Craiova. At the end of the 1990–91 season, the team was relegated back to Divizia B, but Pojar stayed with the club, helping it get promoted back to the first league after one year. At age 27 he suffered an injury which kept him off the field for two years. After returning to play, Pojar suffered a cruciate ligament injury. These injuries necessitated a total of seven operations on his knees. Eventually he retired because of these problems at the end of the 1997–98 season. He has a total of 174 Divizia A matches with four goals, and 20 appearances, also with four goals in Divizia B, receiving a single red card in his entire career. In October 2011, in order to inaugurate the new Cluj Arena stadium, "U" Cluj organized a friendly match against Kuban Krasnodar, where Pojar was working as an assistant and the match also served as Pojar's retirement match. He played again a few minutes for "U", the game ending with a 4–0 loss to the Russians.

== International career ==
Pojar played one game for Romania's under-21 team when on 20 August 1986 he was sent at halftime by coach Mircea Rădulescu to replace Marcel Sabou in a 3–0 loss to Norway.

== Coaching career ==
Pojar started working as an assistant coach for Tiberiu Poraczky at Universitatea Cluj in the 1998–99 Divizia A season. Subsequently, he worked again for the same team, assisting Ioan Sabău's in the 2000–01 Divizia C season, helping them earn promotion to Divizia B. In 2004, he became Dan Petrescu's assistant at Sportul Studențesc, following him in Poland at Wisła Kraków. Afterwards they came back to Romania at Unirea Urziceni, where they won the 2008–09 Liga I title. Then, they moved to Russia, coaching at Kuban Krasnodar and Dynamo Moscow.

== Honours ==
Universitatea Cluj

- Divizia B: 1984–85, 1991–92

== See also ==
- List of one-club men in association football
