= Zoltán Ivansuc =

Romanian footballer (1938-1982)

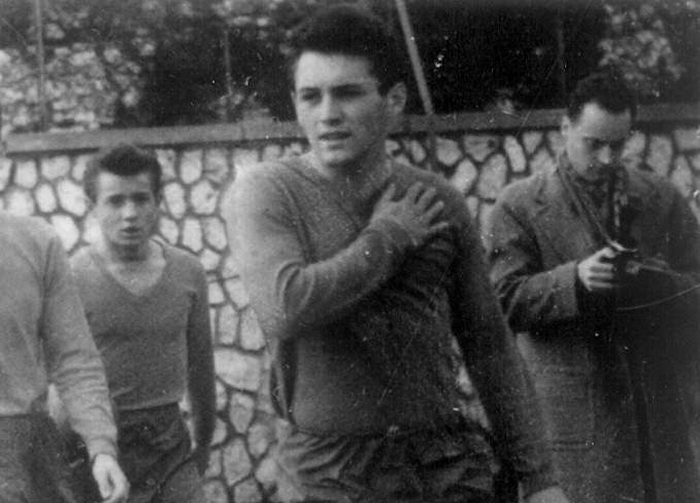
- Zoltán Ivansuc in the 1960s.

Personal information
- Date of birth: 12 August 1938
- Place of birth: Reșița, Romania
- Date of death: 27 January 1982 (aged 43)
- Place of death: Cluj-Napoca, Romania
- Height: 1.76 m (5 ft 9 in)
- Position: Forward

Youth career
- 1952–1955: Electromotor Timișoara

Senior career*
Years	Team	Apps	(Gls)
1957–1958	CSM Reșița		
1959–1968	Universitatea Cluj	185	(41)
1968–1969	IS Câmpia Turzii	2	(0)
Total		187	(41)

International career^{‡}
1959–1961	Romania U23	2	(1)
1961	Romania B	2	(0)
1962	Romania	3	(0)
- * Club domestic league appearances and goals as of 19 September 2017 ‡ National team caps and goals as of 19 September 2017

Zoltán "Zoli" Ivansuc (12 August 1938 – 27 January 1982) was a Romanian footballer who played mainly as a forward for Universitatea Cluj.

== Club career ==
Ivansuc was born on 12 August 1938 in Reșița, Romania and began playing junior-level football at Electromotor Timișoara from 1952 until 1955. Afterwards he started his senior career as he returned to his hometown in order to play for CSM Reșița in Divizia B.

Then he moved to Universitatea Cluj where on 3 May 1959 he made his Divizia A debut under coach Virgil Mărdărescu in a 1–0 home victory against Știința Timișoara. In the following season he scored his first goal with a 30-meter shot in a 3–2 loss to Farul Constanța. The highlights of Ivansuc's time with The Red Caps were two fourth places in the 1960–61 and 1962–63 seasons, and a personal record of nine goals scored in the 1966–67 season. He was also used for the entire match by coach Andrei Sepci in the 1965 Cupa României final, managing to score a goal with a 25-meter free kick in the 2–1 victory over Dinamo Pitești at the Republicii Stadium which brought the club their first trophy. Afterwards, "U" Cluj played in the first round of the 1965–66 European Cup Winners' Cup, with Ivansuc scoring in both legs of the 3–0 aggregate victory against Austrian team, Wiener Neustadt, but they were eliminated in the following round by Atlético Madrid. At the second match against the Spaniards, played in Madrid, Ivansuc was approached by a representative of Real Madrid, who came specifically to persuade him to stay in Spain, but he was adamant to remain in Cluj, and denied any possibility of a move. Ivansuc's last Divizia A appearance took place on 12 November 1968, playing for Universitatea in a 2–0 loss to Steaua București, totaling 185 appearances with 41 goals in the competition. His former wife, Sanda Popescu, claimed that Constantin Teașcă's second stint on Universitatea's bench led to Ivansuc leaving the team, as they had a conflict in Teașcă's first term.

He ended his career after playing two games for IS Câmpia Turzii in the 1968–69 Divizia B season.

== International career ==
Between 1959 and 1961, Ivansuc made several appearances for Romania's under-23 and B squads.

He made his debut for Romania on 30 September 1962 under coach Constantin Teașcă in a 4–0 friendly victory against Morocco. Ivansuc's following game was another friendly, a 3–2 loss to East Germany. His last match for the national team was a 6–0 loss to Spain in the 1964 European Nations' Cup qualifiers.

== Style of play ==
Ivansuc's style of play was analyzed by Dr. Constantin Rădulescu as follows:"Right winger, in my opinion "unique in Romanian football". Born with a gift for football but also strange behavior, coming from Reșița with a brief training, endowed with exceptional speed, especially from the spot, explosive, reaction, extraordinary fantasy, you could not anticipate what execution he would make; right-footed kick from the ankle joint gave the ball curious and unexpected trajectories, crosses from a 45 angle and the goals scored, memorable. When he was on his day, he was unstoppable, he also avoided harshness and technical fouls. He played in the junior, youth and senior national teams. Correct behavior with colleagues, warm, although very closed, with periodic strange manifestations."

Remus Câmpeanu, his former Universitatea Cluj teammate, said about him:"It's hard to characterize Ivansuc. He could have been taken to school and presented as a model of what a footballer should look like, physically. He looked and was like a model footballer. I don't want to exaggerate, but it's like he was better than Cristiano Ronaldo, it's just that he had nowhere to show his qualities. (...) He was unique. In five minutes he could change the whole game. He had an "explosion" like a bullet. Off the pitch he was a man of special modesty. He had friends from university professors to college doormen."

== Personal life and death ==
Ivansuc was married to Sanda Popescu, with whom he had a daughter, Barbara, before their divorce in 1975. After his departure from "U" Cluj, he worked as a doctor in Câmpia Turzii.

Ivansuc was found dead in his apartment on 27 January 1982, after suffering a cardiac arrest.

== Honours ==
Universitatea Cluj

- Cupa României: 1964–65
