= Turnu Roșu =

- Commune
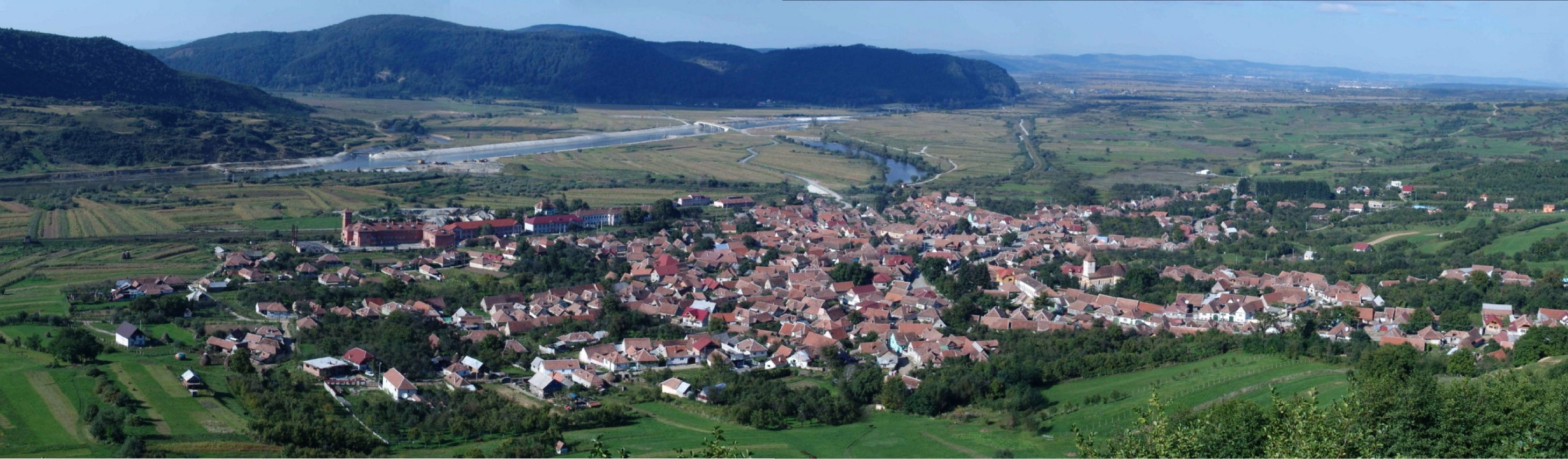
- Panoramic view of Turnu Roșu

- Coat of arms

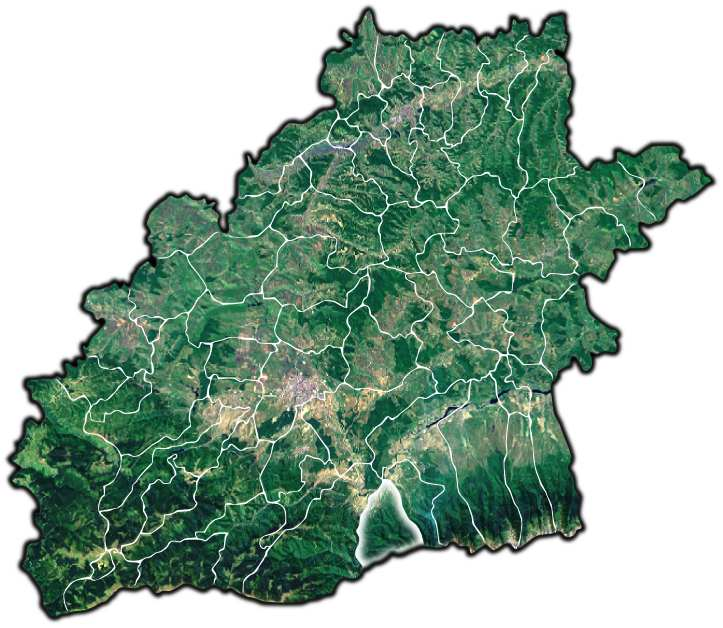
- Location in Sibiu County

- Location in Romania
- Coordinates: 45°38′N 24°18′E
- Country: Romania
- County: Sibiu

Government
  - Mayor (2020–2024): Stelian Istrate (PMP)
- Area: 77.84 km^{2} (30.05 sq mi)
- Population (2021-12-01): 2,340
  - Density: 30.1/km^{2} (77.9/sq mi)
- Time zone: UTC+02:00 (EET)
  - Summer (DST): UTC+03:00 (EEST)
- Postal code: 557285
- Area code: +(40) 0269
- Vehicle reg.: SB
- Website: primariaturnurosu.ro

Turnu Roșu (German: Rothenturm; Hungarian: Vöröstorony) is a commune located in Sibiu County, Transylvania, Romania. It is composed of two villages, Sebeșu de Jos (Unterschewesch; Oltalsósebes), and Turnu Roșu.
