= FC Universitatea Cluj =

Association football club in Cluj-Napoca

Universitatea Cluj
- Full name: Asociația Sportivă Fotbal Club Universitatea Cluj
- Nicknames: Șepcile roșii (The Red Caps); Studenții (The Students); Alb-negrii (The White and Blacks)
- Short name: U Cluj
- Founded: 23 November 1919; 106 years ago as Societatea Sportivă a Studenților Universitari; 2016; 10 years ago (refounding) as ACSF Alb-Negru al Studenților Clujeni
- Ground: Cluj Arena
- Capacity: 30,201
- Owners: Cluj-Napoca Municipality; Babeș-Bolyai University; U Cluj Supporters Association
- Chairman: Radu Constantea
- Head coach: Cristiano Bergodi
- League: Liga I
- 2025–26: Liga I, 2nd of 16
- Website: www.fcucluj.ro
Home colours	Away colours	Third colours

Asociația Sportivă Fotbal Club Universitatea Cluj (Romanian pronunciation: [universiˈtate̯a kluʒ]), commonly known as Universitatea Cluj or simply U Cluj, is a Romanian professional football club based in the city of Cluj-Napoca, Cluj County, that competes in the Liga I, the top flight of the Romanian league system.

Founded in 1919 by professor of medicine Iuliu Hațieganu, Universitatea Cluj has spent more than half of its history in the Romanian first league. Its best finishes in the competition are second place in the 1932–33 and 2025–26 seasons. The club has also reached seven finals of the Cupa României, claiming the trophy in the 1964–65 campaign with a 2–1 defeat of Dinamo Pitești. Historically one of the most prominent football teams in the region of Transylvania, Universitatea's main competitor has been city rival CFR Cluj, particularly since the 2000s.

Universitatea's players and supporters are nicknamed Șepcile roșii ("the Red Caps"), a reference to the red caps traditionally worn by students of the University of Medicine and Pharmacy. The team traditionally plays in white and black, although red, maroon, and gold have also featured in its kits. Its home ground is Cluj Arena, which opened in 2011 and has a capacity of approximately 30,000 spectators.

== History ==
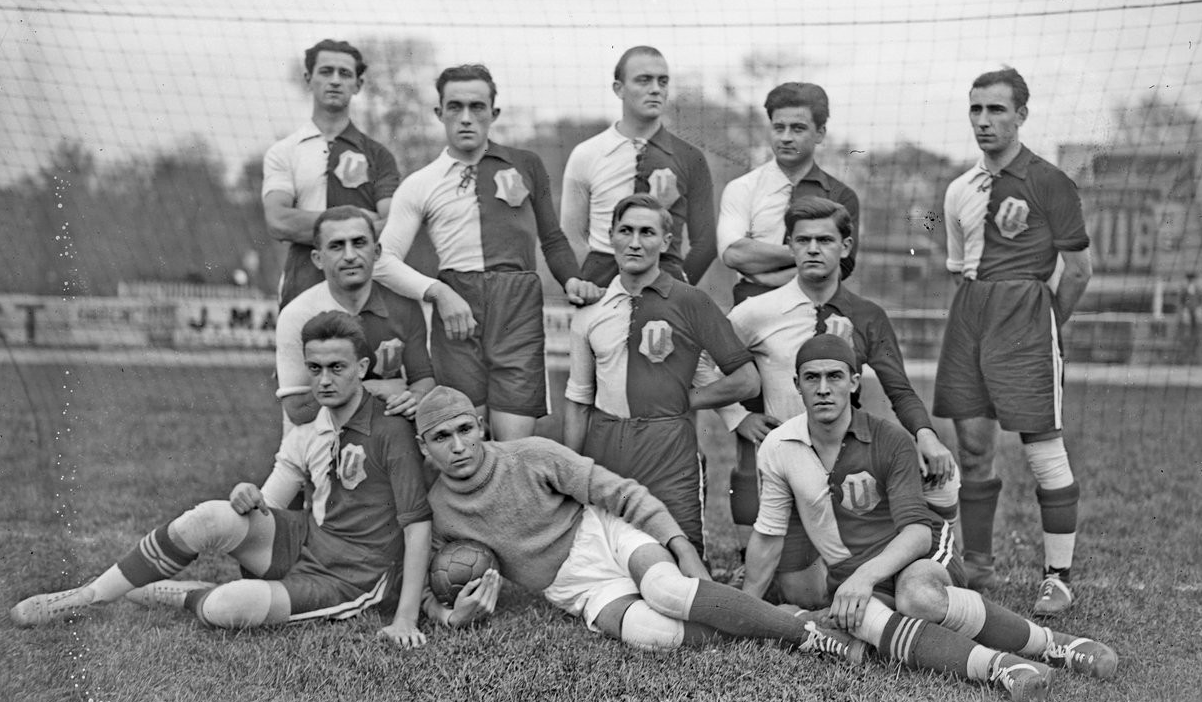
U Cluj squad in 1923 before a match at the Stade Bergeyre in Paris, France.

The Universitatea sports club of Cluj was founded on 23 November 1919 by the "Sports Society of University Students" (Romanian: Societatea Sportivă a Studenților Universitari—abbreviated to "U"), the press from Cluj wrote an announcement that day:"With patriotic warmth for every young Romanian university student to hold on to a holy duty to join the sports lists that are at the University's Secretariat". Its first chairman was Professor Iuliu Hațieganu, a physician and politician who in 1932 said:"Our goal is not to create champions, but healthy people. Not record, but harmony, not hate, but camaraderie; not personal victory, but the victory of the nation; don't speculate, but sacrifice". Between 1930 and 1932, Hațieganu also funded a youth sports park on the southern bank of the Someșul Mic river, dedicating it to the memory of his deceased son. On 16 May 1920, the team played its first game, a 3–1 win over Gloria Arad with goals scored by Crâsnic II, Târla and Vatian, the first 11 being: Mihai Tripa – Aurel Guga, Eugen Metainu – Brutus Ratiu, Ioan Nichin, Petrila Petica, Arcadie Crâsnic I – Sabin Vatianu, Eugen Crâsnic II, Sabin Târla, Nicolae Gruescu. In addition to participating in the first regional championships, "U" stands out as the first Romanian team to perform in an international tournament. It happened in 1923, Cluj playing with some of the most important teams from France, Italy and Yugoslavia: 0–5 Stade Francaise, 4–2 with Lyon, 3–0 with Grenoble Etudiant Club, 0–1 with Politehnica Turin and 1–2 with HAŠK Zagreb.

In the early years of its existence "U" Cluj played in local competitions; at the time there was no national football championship in Romania. The team played against Chinezul Timișoara in the 1923 final of the Mara Cup, losing 0–2. "U" played in the Romania national football championship Divizia A from 1932. In their first season "U" finished first in its group and played the championship final against Ripensia Timișoara (0–0 and 3–5). In the first season of the Romanian Cup, in 1933–34, "U" reached the final, losing against Ripensia Timișoara (0–5).

The first notable captain of "U" Cluj was Mircea Luca who took the captain armband in 1941, in the hardest period of the club's history, as in 1940, the team moved from Cluj-Napoca to Sibiu as a result of the Second Vienna Award, when the northern part of Transylvania was ceded to Hungary. In 1945, after the end of the Second World War and the return of the northern part of Transylvania to Romania, "U" returned to its home in Cluj. During these years some players left to play for Bucharest teams but Luca refused to do so, also the team's biggest performance was the reaching of the 1942 Cupa României final, which however was lost in front of Rapid București. After the war, in which some of the club's players died, the team had to earn its right to play in Cluj by facing Ferar Cluj, which had competed in the Hungarian league during the war under the name Kolozsvár AC and fielded more experienced players. "U" won the match 4–0, a result historian Gheorghe Bodea attributed largely to Luca's performance in defense.

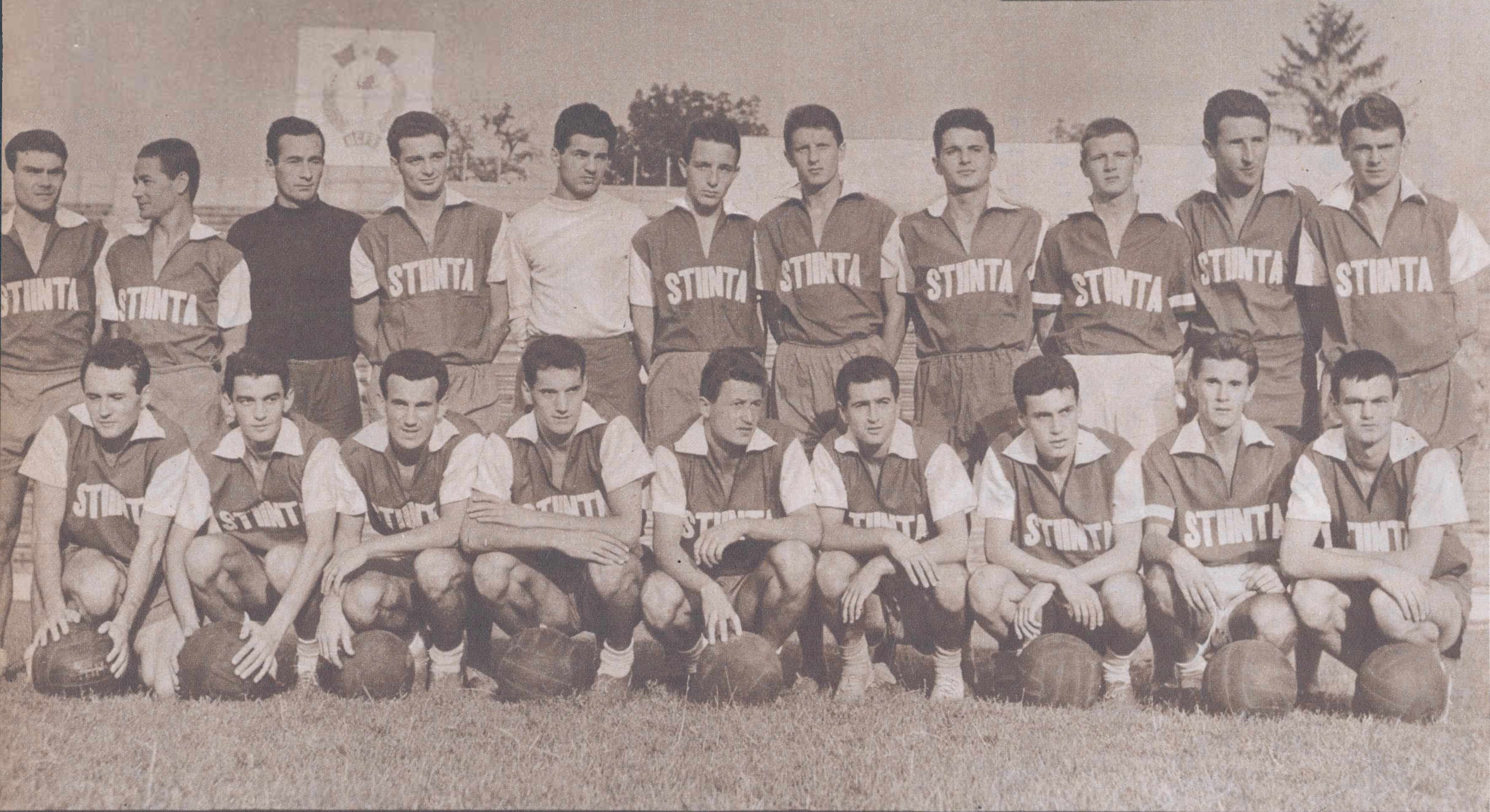
Știința Cluj squad in 1963

In 1946, the name of the club was changed to Știința Cluj (Science Cluj) and in the summer of the same year, the Romanian Football Federation decided that they had to play a play-off against Victoria Cluj in order to earn the right to play in the 1946–47 Divizia A season. The first leg ended 1–1, but The Red Caps won the second leg with 3–1, thus earning their right to play in the first league where they would stay for the following three seasons, relegating in 1949. During this period the team also reached the 1949 Cupa României final for the third time, but it was beaten by CSCA București—now called Steaua București (1–2).

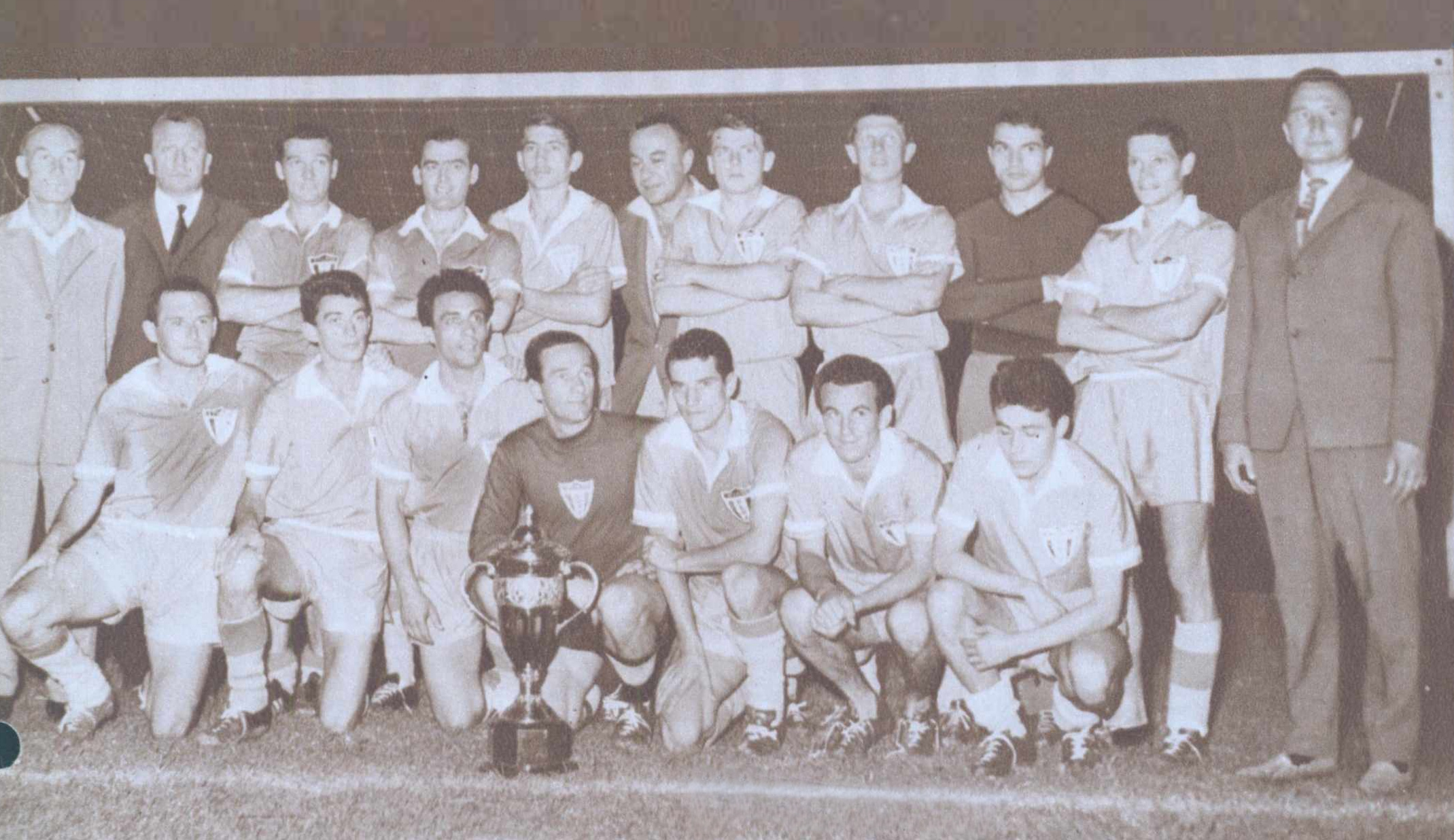
Știința Cluj posing with the Cupa României trophy in 1965.

At the end of the 1950s and the beginning of the 1960s, the manager of Știința Cluj was Ștefan Kovács—a famous Romanian coach who later became the manager of Ajax Amsterdam. In 1964–65, Știința Cluj defeated with 2–1 Dinamo Pitești with goals scored by Câmpeanu and Ivansuc and won the Cupa României under coach Andrei Sepci who used the following players in the final: Simion Moguț – Paul Marcu, Traian Georgescu (c), Paul Grăjdeanu, Remus Câmpeanu – Vasile Alexandru, Mircea Neșu – Nicolae Szabo, Zoltán Ivansuc, Mihai Adam, Ioan Suciu. In the following season, the club made its debut in European competitions, participating in the 1965–66 European Cup Winners' Cup, eliminating Austrian team, Wiener Neustadt with 3–0 on aggregate in the first round, the goals being scored by Ivansuc (2) and Adam but they got eliminated in the following round by Atlético Madrid.

In 1966, the name of the team was changed back to "Universitatea". At the end of the 1971–1972 season, "U" was in the best position in the Romanian Championship Divizia A after the Second World War; it finished third in the league table, with the same number of points as the second placed team UTA Arad. In 1998, "U" reached the final of Cupa Ligii but lost to FCM Bacău. In 1999, "U" was relegated into the second Romanian division, Divizia B and in 2000 it was relegated for the first time in its history into the third division, Divizia C. It played one season in the third division, and in 2001 it was promoted back to Divizia B. The manager of the team at the time was the ex-Romanian international, Ioan Ovidiu Sabău—who started playing football in the 1980s at "U" Cluj.In the 2005–06 Divizia B season, the new objective became promotion to the first league. Under coach Leo Grozavu, who often played highly defensive football, the team made many nil draws and the team lost second place (promotion play-off) by a point, though in the last match days they won 4–0 with the first place and the third, and 3–2 (after leading 3–0) with the second place.

In the beginning of the 2006–07 Liga II season (Divizia B was renamed to Liga II in this season), a new manager, Adrian Falub—who had never coached before but had played over 220 matches for "U" Cluj in the first league—was hired. Under his lead, the team had a poor early season and only reached eighth position. Yet, the moment passed and the team reached first position, often separated by over 6 points from the next position. On 19 May 2007, virtual promotion was achieved after a 0–0 draw against second place contender Dacia Mioveni. Three weeks before the final match day, "U" ended its 8-year spell in the lower divisions, returning to the first league for the 52nd season in its history.

Name	Period
Societatea Sportivă a Studenților Universitari Cluj	1919–1940
Universitatea Cluj-Sibiu	1940–1945
Știința Cluj	1946–1948
CSU Cluj	1948–1950
Știința Cluj	1950–1966
Universitatea Cluj	1966–1994
AS FC Universitatea Cluj	1994–2015
ACS Alb-Negru al Studenților Clujeni	2016–2017
FC Universitatea Cluj	2017–present

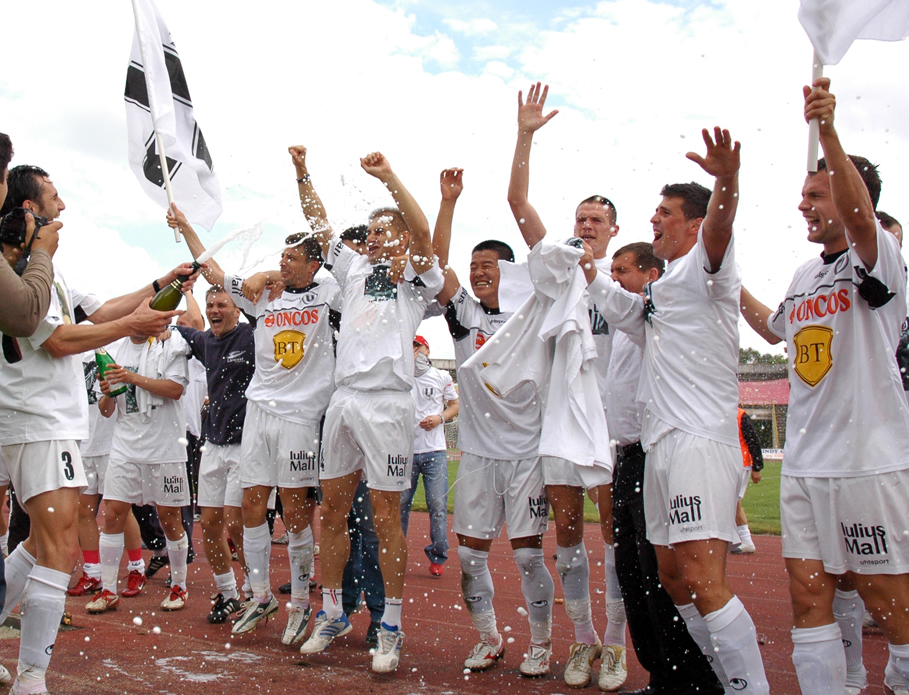
"U" Cluj players celebrating the promotion in the Liga I in 2007

The 2007–08 Liga I season was the first season in Liga I for "U" Cluj since the 1999-2000 season, following an eight-year absence from the top division. The club struggled with the promotion and finished the season in 18th place, the last position, with 23 points, resulting in relegation back to Liga II.

The 2008–09 Liga II season was a transition one and "U" was saved from relegation to Liga III in the last round, after a 3–0 victory against Arieșul Turda while the main contra-candidate ACU Arad ended only 1–1 at home against Bihor Oradea, a match which was followed by a major scandal. Bihor Oradea accused ACU Arad of trying to fix the match, a victory being enough for the team from Arad to save from relegation.

In the summer of 2009 "U" Cluj was taken over by Florian Walter, owner of the facility management company Romprest Service. After only one season under the ownership of Walter, "U" Cluj was promoted to Liga I finishing second in the 2009–10 Liga II season.

In the new season, "U" Cluj demonstrated that was much better prepared from an administrative and sports point of view and managed to finish 2010–11 Liga I season in eighth place, far away from the relegation area.

The 2011–12 Liga I season brought "U" to another area of its existence. Well known and valuable players like Mircea Bornescu, George Galamaz, Gabriel Boștină, Marian Cristescu, Ovidiu Hoban, Gheorghe Grozav, Laurențiu Marinescu and Tony were bought by the club and the objective was qualification in the UEFA Europa League. Șepcile Roșii finished only in seventh place and failed to achieve the objective, but they got the best ranking of the club in the last 26 years.

In the summer of 2012, Florian Walter left "U" Cluj and became the owner of Petrolul Ploiești. Together with his departure, most valuable players left also the club and signed with the team from Ploiești. Left without the main financier, Alb-Negrii attempted to form a squad of competitive players with little money. In February 2013 club debts grew worrying and "U" went into insolvency. Despite all the financial problems the team saved from relegation, finishing 12th at the end of 2012–13 season.

In the spring of 2013 Florian Walter announced that he would return at "U" Cluj. At the end of the 2012–13 season a new problem shook the already disturbed environment of "U" Cluj. The license committee refused to license the club for the 2013–14 Liga I season and decided to relegate it to Liga II. Șepcile Roșii contested the decision at CAS and won, assuring their presence in the next season of Liga I. 2013–14 season it would once again be one without claims for "U" due to financial problems that the club had. Also Florian Walter no longer seemed interested in investing too much in the team. With all the problems Studenții managed again to save from relegation, finishing 11th.

The 2014–15 Liga I season was a reorganization one, with six teams relegated instead of four, in an attempt to reduce Liga I teams from 18 to 14. "U" Cluj struggled with its few resources until the very end, but at the end of the season the club was placed on 15th position and relegated to Liga II after its five-year spell in Liga I.

Chart showing the progress of U Cluj's league finishes from 1932 to 2017

Relegation to the Liga II was a disaster for "U"'s already shaky financial situation. The club formed a squad primarily with young players from the academy hoping that through their ambition and a miracle the team would be promoted back to Liga I after only one season in Liga II. That was the only solution for saving the club, which was at that moment in insolvency for two and a half years and with an owner, Florian Walter, present only as a name in the papers. Walter did not invest in the club and was also being tracked for tax evasion and money laundering.

The 2015–16 Liga II season was one of extremes for "U" Cluj. In the first part of the championship the team had run over expectations and had great chances of promotion. But after the winter break the financial situation become worse and the team started to have bad results which ended with a qualification in the play-out tournament, without any chances of promotion. This moment was a crucial one; without any motivation the team ended the championship on tenth place and relegated to Liga III.

The summer of 2016 meant a new beginning for "U". With a sporting society in insolvency, with big chances of bankruptcy and an owner arrested for tax evasion and money laundering, there was no other solution than the formation of a new club. Cluj-Napoca Municipality, which is the owner of "U" Cluj logo and record, terminated the lease agreement with the company of Florian Walter. Then Cluj-Napoca Municipality together with Babeș-Bolyai University and "U" Cluj Supporters Association started a new project entitled ACSF Alb-Negru al Studenților Clujeni (ACSF White-Black of the Students from Cluj) a name that was given to the new team, because the society administered by Florian Walter was not yet bankrupt and the name of FC Universitatea Cluj could not belong to two companies. After the foundation of the new team Cluj-Napoca Municipality rented "U" logo and record to the new society. The team was enrolled in Liga IV–Cluj County, Ioan Ovidiu Sabău has been named team manager and Marius Popescu the new coach. Șepcile Roșii also signed with a lot of valuable players like Octavian Abrudan, Alexandru Păcurar, Dorin Goga or Gabriel Giurgiu. Together with them in the team have been added the most talented players of "U" Cluj Football Academy and the objective was the promotion. The project was a real success and Studenții won Liga IV without any problems, winning 26 matches and making only a draw in a match against Sticla Arieșul Turda. Also the team achieved the number of 1,000 contributing members and a lot of development projects are planned.

On 29 September 2016 Walter's society, FC Universitatea Cluj, has gone bankrupt leaving the name free. But the bankruptcy occurred after the starting of the 2016–17 Liga IV season, so the name remained ACSF Alb-Negru al Studenților Clujeni for that season. On 11 May 2017 was announced officially that from the 2017–18 season the team will return to the old name, FC Universitatea Cluj and also the basketball team will evolve under the same brand.

== Stadium ==
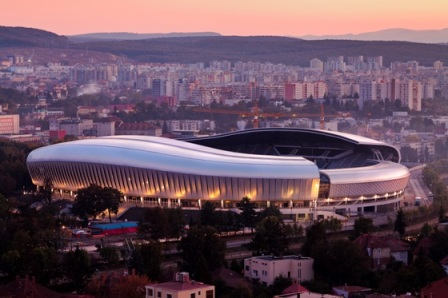
Cluj Arena at night

Ion Moina Stadium, the first football and athletics stadium in Cluj-Napoca, was built between 1908 and 1911 and had a capacity of 1,500. The official inauguration in 1911 was a game between a Cluj team and Galatasaray Istanbul. It was the first game in Europe for Galatasaray; the Cluj team won 8–1. In 1961, new U-shaped stands were built and the capacity of the stadium became 28,000. In 2000, most of the stands were declared structurally unsafe for hosting supporters and were closed, leaving the stadium with a capacity of 12–13,000. In late 2008, the old "Ion Moina" Stadium was demolished, and building works begun for the Cluj Arena. The last official game at the old stadium was played on 22 November 2008; Universitatea drew 0–0 in their Liga II game with Mureșul Deva.

During the construction works for the new stadium, Universitatea played its home games in the 2008–09 and 2009–10 Liga II seasons at the Clujana Stadium and its home games in the 2010–11 Liga I season at the Cetate Stadium in Alba Iulia, Gloria Stadium in Bistrița and Gaz Metan Stadium in Mediaș.

On 11 October 2011, the first match at the new Cluj Arena stadium—a friendly between Universitatea and the Russian team Kuban Krasnodar—was played and Kuban won 4–0; the game was also the retirement match for one-club man, Cristinel Pojar who played a few minutes for "U". The first official match at the new stadium was played; Universitatea won the Liga I game against FC Brașov 1–0 on 16 October 2011. A Court of Accounts audit found that the company operating Cluj Arena had been liable for building tax to Cluj-Napoca Municipality from the venue's 2011 inauguration onward but had not paid it, leaving debts of over 15 million lei by 2016.

== Support ==
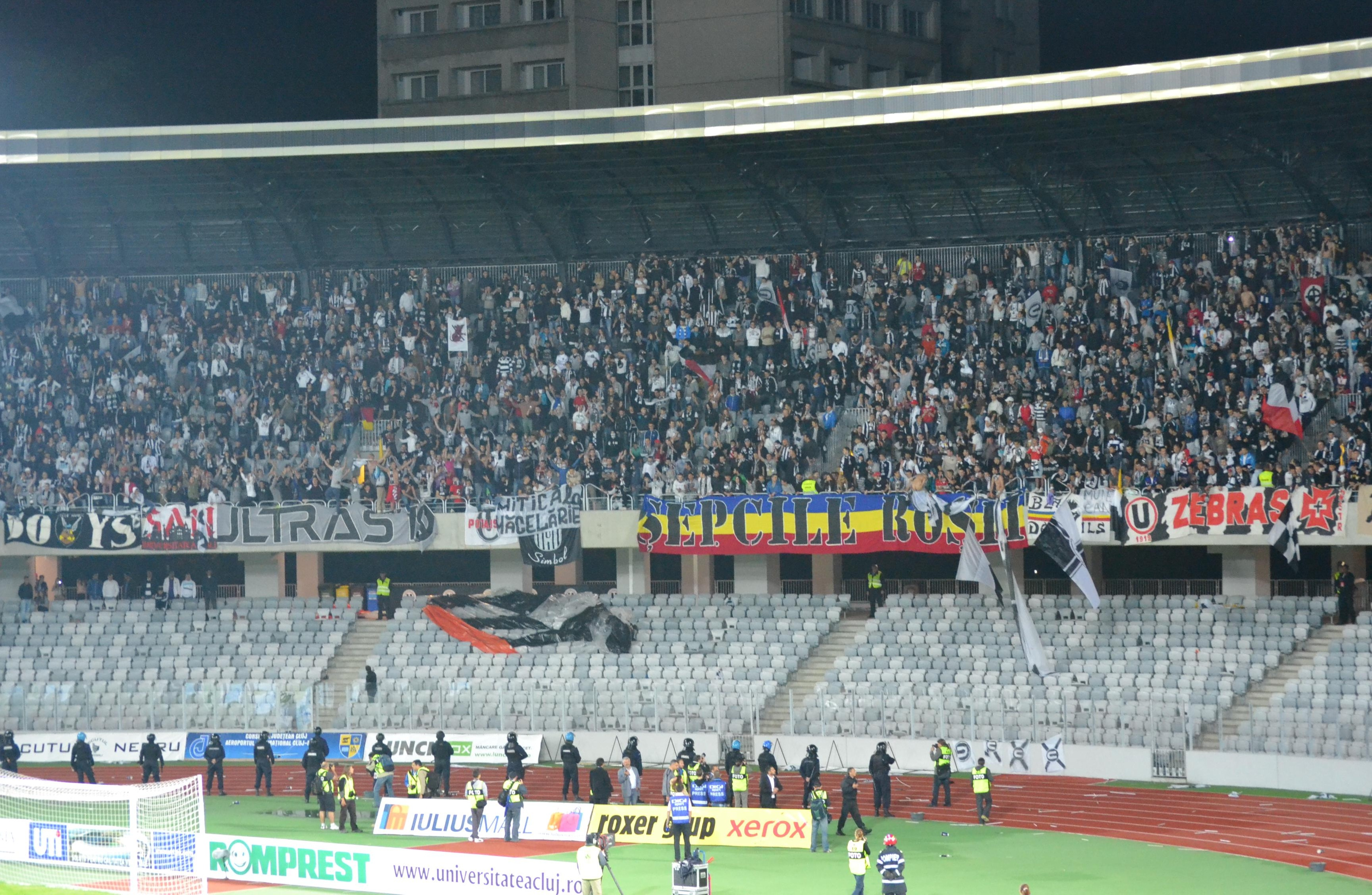
"U" Cluj supporters during a First Division game (season 2011–12)

"U" has many supporters in Cluj-Napoca, but also in some other parts of Romania—especially in Transylvania. One of the reasons for the team's popularity is that Cluj-Napoca has some of Romania's most important universities—including the Babeș-Bolyai University, the largest in the country with more than 45,000 students.

The history of U's fanatic supporters began in the 1970s, when fan-groups started to appear on the stadium. First, in 1972 appeared Amicii U, one of the first supporters groups in Romania. The group started to compose songs along with Music Academy's students and wear accessories like the well-known red hats or pins with the club's crest. Those years, Slavă ție studenție was composed, being nowadays club's anthem. After the fall of communist regime, the Ultras idea arrived in Romania. First ultras group founded was Vecchia Guardia in 1996, followed by Ultra Curva Groapa in 1997 and Ultras 19 in 2004.

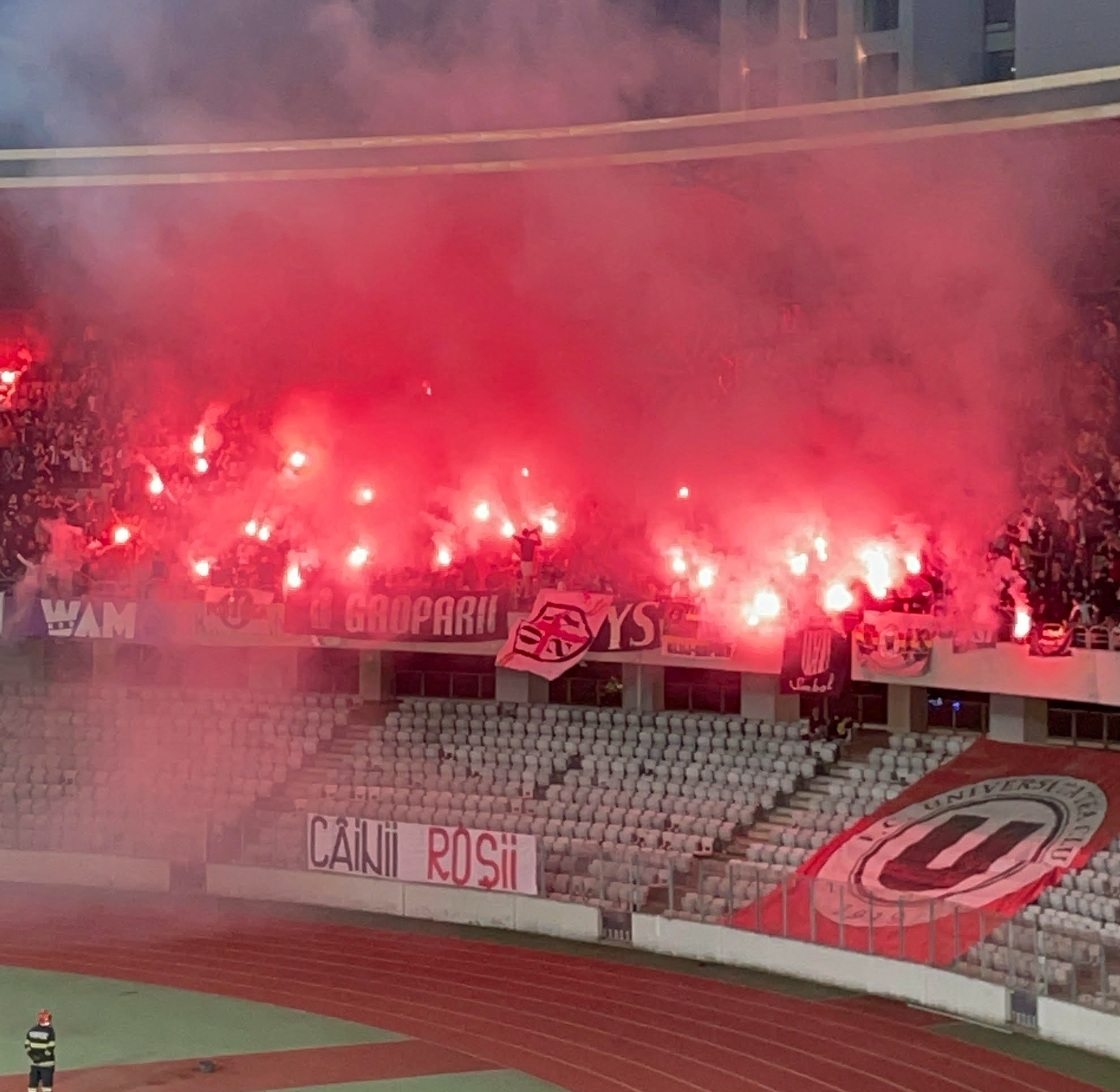
"U" Cluj fans during a Liga 1 promotion game against Dinamo Bucharest in 2022

Some of the present-day ultras groups of "U" Cluj are Groparii, VG (Vecchia Guardia), BOYS, MADS, FPU (The Few The Proud The Ultras), Potaissa, PPS (Prezenti pentru simbol), MNST (Mănăștur). .

The fanaticism sometimes led to violence, some violent episode being in 1979 when Sportul Studențesc won the match with "U" due to poor referee decisions. After the match, supporters began to shout thieves in front of the stadium and the police started to fight the angry fans. Other episode happened in 2008, when CFR fans went to one of the main squares of the city to celebrate a Dinamo victory over Steaua, that advantage their team to win the league that year. Some Universitatea fans went to the square and had a fight with the rivals before police intervention.

=== Rivalries and friendships ===
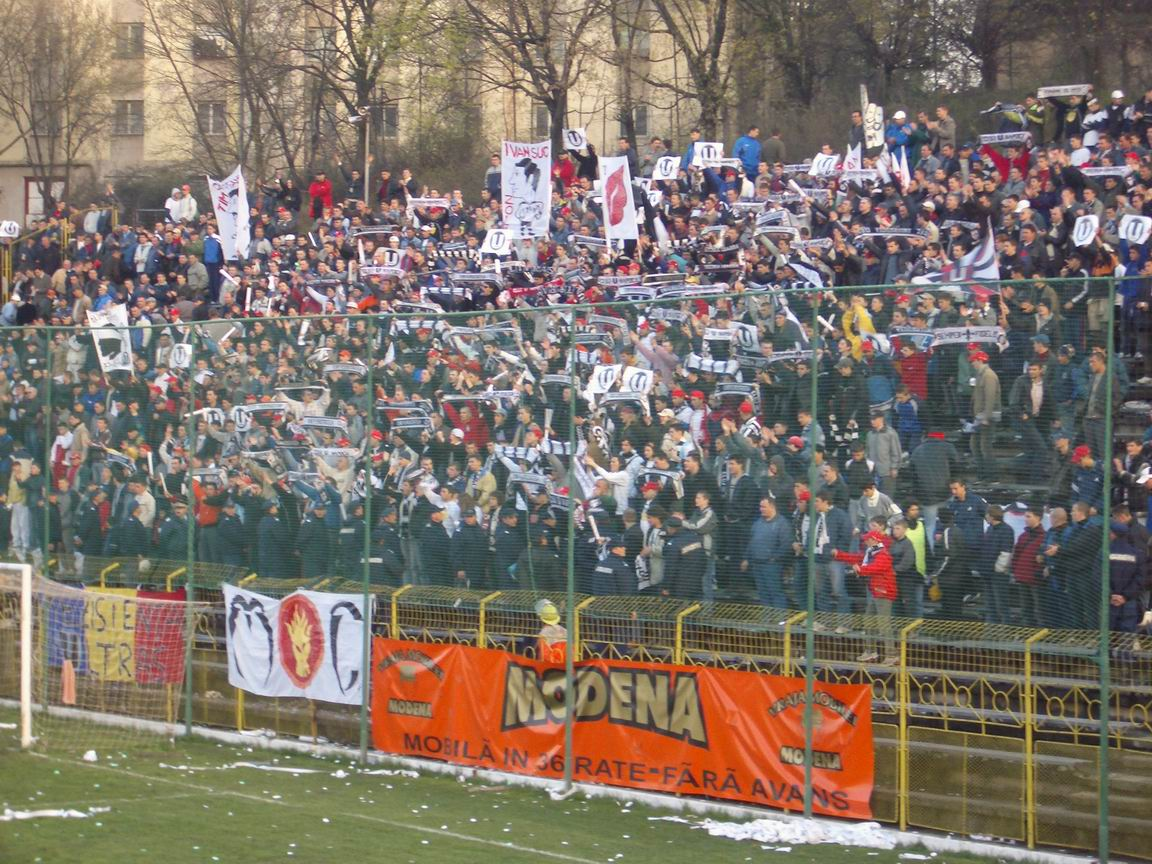
"U" Cluj supporters during a Second Division game against CFR Cluj in 2004

Universitatea have a rivalry with local city team CFR Cluj. The animosity between the teams is one of the oldest in Romanian football. The first incidents between fans of the two sides occurred in the 1920s. A particularly violent episode took place during a derby played in 1924, when the stadium had to be evacuated because of a large-scale fight between supporters. Universitatea won the match 2–1. Other episodes of this rivalry are: in 2005, upset by the fact that Universitatea lost a match against UTA Arad, "U" fans injured CFR players at the Sport Hotel in Cluj-Napoca; in 2008, following a derby, CFR won and obtained its first league title and Universitatea relegated in Liga II, but this match was preceded by a corruption scandal, because Steaua București's owner, Gigi Becali, offered "U" staff one million euros for defeating CFR. Accusations over that case resurfaced in February 2026, when the presidents of both clubs traded claims about suspicious refereeing in the decisive 2008 and 2012 matches. The derby has continued to draw wide attention in the following years, including in the Cupa României, with local authorities urging supporters to keep the rivalry peaceful.

The second-most important rivalry is against UTA Arad due serious clashes between fans in 2006, 2011, 2019. Another rivalries are Steaua București, Farul Constanța, FC Rapid București, FCSB, Petrolul Ploiești and SSU Politehnica Timișoara.

Universitatea's fans have a good friendship with Dinamo's fans, the main rivals of FCSB and Rapid. Dinamo friendship started in the mid-1990s, both ultras groups being linked with the "mentality, fanaticism and nationalist side", although in the 1970s and 1980s, "U" supporters had friendships with other important clubs fans, like Politehnica Timișoara or Rapid București, these teams being the few that already had fan-groups. The ultras group Students ‘12 have a friend relation with Strassbourg Offender, the of supporters of the RC Strasbourg Alsace, known for his many violent actions. The group was dissolved by the government in September 2025.

== Honours ==
=== Leagues ===
- Divizia A / Liga I
  - Runners-up (2): 1932–33, 2025–26
- Divizia B / Liga II
  - Winners (6): 1950, 1957–58, 1978–79, 1984–85, 1991–92, 2006–07
  - Runners-up (3): 1939–40, 1983–84, 2009–10
- Divizia C / Liga III
  - Winners (2): 2000–01, 2017–18
- Liga IV – Cluj County
  - Winners (1): 2016–17
- Cupa României
  - Winners (1): 1964–65
  - Runners-up (6): 1933–34, 1941–42, 1948–49, 2014–15, 2022–23, 2025–26
- Cupa Ligii
  - Runners-up (1): 1998
- Supercupa României
  - Runners-up (1): 2026

== Players ==
=== First-team squad ===
As of 26 October 2026

Note: Flags indicate national team as defined under FIFA eligibility rules; some limited exceptions apply. Players may hold more than one non-FIFA nationality.

No.	Pos.	Nation	Player
1	GK	ROU	Ștefan Lefter
2	DF	ROU	Alin Chinteș
5	MF	ROU	Luca Szimionaș
6	DF	ROU	Iulian Cristea
7	MF	GAM	Mouhamadou Drammeh
8	MF	ROU	Dorin Codrea
10	MF	ROU	Dan Nistor (Vice-captain)
11	MF	ROU	Marius Ștefănescu
12	DF	NGR	Friday Adams
17	FW	BIH	Jovo Lukić
18	MF	POR	Pedro Pinho
19	FW	CIV	Issouf Macalou
20	DF	SUI	Noah Loosli
21	GK	ROU	Denis Moldovan

No.	Pos.	Nation	Player
22	DF	MTQ	Florent Poulolo
23	DF	UGA	Elio Capradossi
24	DF	CRO	Dino Mikanović
25	FW	SWE	Alibek Aliyev
27	MF	ROU	Alexandru Chipciu (Captain)
28	MF	ROU	Darius Mihăilă
29	FW	FRA	Oucasse Mendy
33	FW	SRB	Jug Stanojev
34	GK	ROU	Vlad Rafailă
75	FW	ROU	Eduardo Bodnar
77	MF	ROU	Andrei Gheorghiță
93	GK	CYP	Neofytos Michail
94	MF	ROU	Ovidiu Bic (3rd captain)

=== Dual registration ===
Note: Flags indicate national team as defined under FIFA eligibility rules; some limited exceptions apply. Players may hold more than one non-FIFA nationality.

No.	Pos.	Nation	Player
59	DF	ROU	Alin Techereș (at Politehnica Timișoara)
96	MF	ROU	Lukas Pall (at Politehnica Timișoara)

No.	Pos.	Nation	Player
99	GK	ROU	Tudor Coșa (at Politehnica Timișoara)

=== Other players under contract ===
Note: Flags indicate national team as defined under FIFA eligibility rules; some limited exceptions apply. Players may hold more than one non-FIFA nationality.

No.	Pos.	Nation	Player
26	DF	CIV	Jonathan Cissé

=== Out on loan ===
Note: Flags indicate national team as defined under FIFA eligibility rules; some limited exceptions apply. Players may hold more than one non-FIFA nationality.

No.	Pos.	Nation	Player
50	MF	NGR	Raji Ayomide (at Popești-Leordeni until 30 June 2027)
98	MF	ROU	Gabriel Simion (at Maccabi Netanya until 30 June 2027)
—	GK	ROU	Iustin Chirilă (at Bihor Oradea until 30 June 2027)
—	DF	ROU	Nicholas Pop (at Dumbrăvița until 30 June 2027)
—	MF	ROU	Ovidiu Buia (at 1599 Șelimbăr until 30 June 2027)
—	MF	ROU	Alexandru Bota (at Bihor Oradea until 30 June 2027)
—	MF	ROU	Vlad Lambru (at SCM Zalău until 30 June 2027)
—	MF	ROU	Alex Orban (at Bihor Oradea until 30 June 2027)

No.	Pos.	Nation	Player
—	MF	ROU	Ștefan Lazăr (at Sănătatea Cluj until 30 June 2027)
—	MF	ROU	Antonio Suciu (at Gloria Bistrița until 30 June 2027)
—	MF	ROU	Vlad Tudorache (at Blejoi until 30 June 2027)
—	MF	ROU	Răzvan Vaida (at Unirea Alba Iulia until 30 June 2027)
—	MF	ROU	Tudor Zoicaș (at Metalul Buzău until 30 June 2027)
—	FW	NGR	Ibuchi Chukwu (at Gloria Bistrița until 30 June 2027)
—	FW	ROU	Eneas Horvat (at 1599 Șelimbăr until 30 June 2027)
—	FW	NGR	Quadri Taiwo (at Popești-Leordeni until 30 June 2027)

== Club officials ==
=== Board of directors ===
Role	Name
Owners	(Romania) Cluj-Napoca Municipality (Romania) Babeș-Bolyai University (Romania) "U" Cluj Supporters Association
President	(Romania) Radu Constantea
Executive President	(Moldova) Sevastian Botnari
Vice-president	(Romania) Cosmin Irimieș
Sporting director	(Romania) Gabriel Giurgiu
Team Manager	(Romania) Zsolt Szilágyi
Scouting Director	(Romania) Răzvan Zamfir
Organizer of Competitions	(Romania) Marian Onicaș
Head of Youth Development	(Romania) Mircea Cojocaru
Head of Marketing & Communication	(Romania) Mihai Moga

- Last updated: 1 December 2025

=== Current technical staff ===
Role	Name
Head coach	(Italy) Cristiano Bergodi
Assistant coaches	(Italy) Luigi Ciarlantini (Moldova) Eugeniu Cebotaru
Goalkeeping coach	(Romania) Eugen Anghel
Fitness coaches	(Romania) Flavius Nistor (Romania) Sergiu Coc
Club doctor	(Romania) Dragoș Vălean
Medical assistant	(Romania) Florin Rașoveanu
Physiotherapists	(Romania) Alin Ardelean (Romania) Liviu Ciucă (Romania) Mircea Nuțescu
Masseur	(Romania) Raul Mihai
Storeman	(Romania) Florin Bibire

- Last updated: 26 October 2025

== Shirt sponsors and manufacturers ==
Period	Kit manufacturer	Period	Shirt partner
1994–1995	(Germany) Adidas	1994–1995
1997–2000	(Romania) Ancada	1997–2000	(Romania) BCR
2000–2001	(Spain) Luanvi	2000–2001	(Romania) Artimex Sport
2001–2002	(Germany) Erima	2001–2003	(Romania) S.C.C. Napoca
2002–2003	(Italy) Erreà	2001–2003	(Romania) S.C.C. Napoca
2005–2007	(Germany) Uhlsport	2005–2008	(Romania) Banca Transilvania
2007–2008	(Italy) Diadora	2005–2008	(Romania) Banca Transilvania
2008–2009	(Italy) Lotto	2008–2009
2009–2014	(United States) Nike	2010–2015	(Romania) Romprest
2014–2019	(Germany) Erima	2017–	(Romania) IRUM
2019–	(Germany) Adidas	2020–2026	(Romania) Superbet
2019–	(Germany) Adidas	2026–	(Romania) MrBit

== Records and statistics ==
=== European cups all-time statistics ===
Competition	S	P	W	D	L	GF	GA	GD
UEFA Cup Winners' Cup / European Cup Winners' Cup	1	4	2	0	2	3	6	–3
UEFA Europa League / UEFA Cup	2	4	1	2	1	5	6	–1
UEFA Intertoto Cup	1	4	0	1	3	3	8	–5
UEFA Conference League	2	4	0	2	2	4	7	–3
Total	6	16	3	5	8	15	27	–12

**1965–66 European Cup Winners' Cup**
**Round 1**
Wiener Neustädter (Austria)	0–1	**Știința Cluj**
**Știința Cluj**	2–0	(Austria) Wiener Neustädter
**Round 2**
Știința Cluj	0–2	(Spain) **Atlético Madrid**
**Atlético Madrid** (Spain)	4–0	Știința Cluj
**1972–73 UEFA Cup**
**Round 1**
**Știința Cluj**	4–1	(Bulgaria) Levski Sofia
**Levski Sofia** (Bulgaria)	5–1	Știința Cluj
**1995 UEFA Intertoto Cup**
**Group stage**
HB Tórshavn (Faroe Islands)	0–0	Universitatea Cluj
Universitatea Cluj	0–1	(Norway) **Tromsø**
**Germinal Ekeren** (Belgium)	4–1	Universitatea Cluj
Universitatea Cluj	2–3	(Switzerland) **Aarau**
**2025–26 UEFA Conference League**
**Second qualifying round**
Ararat-Armenia	0–0	**FC Universitatea Cluj**
**FC Universitatea Cluj**	1–2	Ararat-Armenia
**2026–27 UEFA Europa League**
**First qualifying round**
Dynamo Kyiv (Ukraine)	0–0	**FC Universitatea Cluj**
**FC Universitatea Cluj**	0−0 (2−4 p)	(Ukraine) Dynamo Kyiv

=== European record ===
Season	Competition	Round	Club	Home	Away	Aggregate / position
1965–66	European Cup Winners' Cup	R1	(Austria) Wiener Neustädter	2–0	1–0	**3–0**
1965–66	European Cup Winners' Cup	R2	(Spain) Atlético Madrid	0–2	0–4	**0–6**
1972–73	UEFA Cup	R1	(Bulgaria) Levski Sofia	4–1	1–5 (a.e.t.)	**5–6**
1995	UEFA Intertoto Cup	Group 3	(Faroe Islands) HB Tórshavn	—N/a	0–0	**5th**
1995	UEFA Intertoto Cup	Group 3	(Norway) Tromsø IL	0–1	—N/a	**5th**
1995	UEFA Intertoto Cup	Group 3	(Belgium) Germinal Ekeren	—N/a	1–4	**5th**
1995	UEFA Intertoto Cup	Group 3	(Switzerland) FC Aarau	2–3	—N/a	**5th**
2025–26	UEFA Conference League	Q2	Ararat-Armenia	1–2 (a.e.t.)	0–0	**1–2**
2026–27	UEFA Europa League	Q1	(Ukraine) Dynamo Kyiv	0–0 (a.e.t.)	0–0	**0–0** (2–4 pen.)
2026–27	UEFA Conference League	Q2	(Norway) Brann	2–2	1–3	**3–5**

=== History by season ===
==== Key ====
- Pos = Final position
- P = Played
- W = Games won
- D = Games drawn
- L = Games lost
- GF = Goals For
- GA = Goals Against
- Pts = Points
- Div A / L1 = Liga I
- Div B / L2 = Liga II
- Div C / L3 = Liga III
- L4 = Liga IV
- p = Preliminary round
- 1R = Round 1
- 2R = Round 2
- 3R = Round 3
- 4R = Round 4
- 5R = Round 5
- PO = Play-off Round
- GS = Group stage
- R32 = Round of 32
- QF = Quarter-finals
- R16 = Round of 16
- SF = Semi-finals
- F = Final

Champions	Runners-up	Third place	Promoted	Relegated

The players in bold were the top goalscorers in the division.

Season	League									Cup	European Cup		Other		Top Goalscorer(s)		Notes	Name
Season	**Division**	**Pos**	**P**	**W**	**D**	**L**	**GF**	**GA**	**Pts**	Cup	European Cup		Other		**Name**	**Goals**	Notes	Name
**1921**	District	5th	5	1	2	2	6	11	**4**	–								Universitatea Cluj
**1921–22**	District	4th	14	6	1	7	16	21	**13**	–					(Romania) Nicolae Bonciocat	4		Universitatea Cluj
**1922–23**	District	5th	12	4	3	5	13	8	**11**	–					(Romania) Nicolae Bonciocat/Aurel Guga	4		Universitatea Cluj
**1923–24**	District	**1st**	12	8	2	2	20	10	**18**	–			Finals	QF	(Romania) Nicolae Bonciocat	6		Universitatea Cluj
**1924–25**	District	**1st**	14	10	4	0	27	6	**24**	–			Finals	QF	(Romania) Nicolae Bonciocat	5		Universitatea Cluj
**1925–26**	District	2nd	18	11	4	3	43	26	**26**	–					(Romania) Nicolae Bonciocat	14		Universitatea Cluj
**1926–27**	District	**1st**	10	7	2	1	21	8	**16**	–			Finals	SF	(Romania) Aurel Blaj	8		Universitatea Cluj
**1927–28**	District	2nd	10	4	4	2	37	14	**12**	–					(Romania) Vasile Giurgiu	14		Universitatea Cluj
**1928–29**	District	2nd	13	8	1	4	34	18	**17**	–					(Romania) Vasile Giurgiu	8		Universitatea Cluj
**1929–30**	District	**1st**	11	8	2	1	32	16	**16**	–			Finals	SF	(Romania) Vasile Giurgiu	12		Universitatea Cluj
**1930–31**	District	1st	9	7	1	1	31	9	**15**	–					Grațian Sepi	7		Universitatea Cluj
**1931–32**	District	**1st**	9	5	4	0	28	0	**9**	–					Grațian Sepi	9		Universitatea Cluj
**1932–33**	**Div A**	**1st**	12	8	2	2	24	15	**18**	–			Finals	F	(Romania) Grațian Sepi	10	Foundation of the Romanian Football; League system	Universitatea Cluj
**1933–34**	**Div A**	3rd	14	8	1	5	33	17	**17**	F					(Romania) Grațian Sepi	14		Universitatea Cluj
**1934–35**	**Div A**	4th	22	12	1	9	36	34	**25**	R16					(Romania) Silviu Ploeșteanu/Cornel Orza	8		Universitatea Cluj
**1935–36**	**Div A**	12th	22	7	2	13	29	53	**16**	SF					(Romania) Ion Păunescu	8		Universitatea Cluj
**1936–37**	**Div A**	9th	22	8	2	12	38	62	**18**	QF					(Romania) Janos Szaniszlo	13		Universitatea Cluj
**1937–38**	**Div A**	6th	18	7	2	9	33	50	**16**	R32					(Romania) Petre Truță/Petru Draga	8		Universitatea Cluj
**1938–39**	Div B	3rd	18	9	3	6	30	21	**21**	p					(Romania) Emil Țiereanu	13		Universitatea Cluj
**1939–40**	Div B	2nd	18	14	1	3	63	22	**29**	p					(Romania) Paul Wieser	25		Universitatea Cluj
**1940–41**	**Div A**	11th	24	8	1	15	42	58	**17**	p					(Romania) Hariton Dascălu	14	Moved to Sibiu due to Second Vienna Award	Universitatea Cluj-Sibiu
**1941–42**	Bessarabia Cup	SF	3	2	0	1	13	6	–	F								Universitatea Cluj-Sibiu
**1942–43**	War Championship	8th	22	7	6	9	48	51	**20**	QF					(Romania) Hariton Dascălu	22		Universitatea Cluj-Sibiu
**1943–44**	War Championship	4th	13	7	1	5	32	27	**15**	–					(Romania) Hariton Dascălu	11		Universitatea Cluj-Sibiu
**1944–45**	No championship	–	–	–	–	–	–	–	–	–					–	–		Universitatea Cluj
**1945–46**	District	**1st**	5	4	1	0	19	5	**9**	–								Universitatea Cluj
**1946–47**	**Div A**	9th	26	11	3	12	54	47	**25**	–					(Romania) Hariton Dascălu	17		Universitatea Cluj
**1947–48**	**Div A**	4th	30	14	6	10	54	48	**34**	R16					(Romania) Hariton Dascălu	18		Universitatea Cluj
**1948–49**	**Div A**	12th	26	7	5	14	31	50	**19**	F					(Romania) Sever Coracu	10		C.S.U. Cluj
**1949**	Autumn Cup	5th	10	3	4	3	13	13	**10**	–					(Romania) Iosif Lutz	4		C.S.U. Cluj
**1950**	Div B	**1st**	22	14	6	2	47	16	**34**	R16					(Romania) Silviu Avram	12		Știința Cluj
**1951**	**Div A**	6th	22	8	5	9	32	36	**21**	R32					(Romania) Silviu Avram	10		Știința Cluj
**1952**	**Div A**	5th	22	7	7	8	24	23	**21**	R16					(Romania) Alexandru Moldovan/Miron Dragoman	6		Știința Cluj
**1953**	**Div A**	8th	21	7	4	10	24	31	**18**	SF					(Romania) Silviu Avram	12		Știința Cluj
**1954**	**Div A**	5th	26	11	6	9	32	32	**28**	R32					(Romania) Miron Dragoman	9		Știința Cluj
**1955**	**Div A**	7th	24	8	7	9	27	35	**23**	R32					(Romania) Miron Dragoman	9		Știința Cluj
**1956**	**Div A**	12th	24	6	5	13	22	48	**17**	R16					(Romania) Miron Dragoman	6		Știința Cluj
**1957**	Spring Cup	3rd	12	6	2	4	25	23	**14**	–					(Romania) Horațiu Moldovan	8		Știința Cluj
**1957–58**	Div B	**1st**	26	17	3	6	58	23	**37**	p					(Romania) Horațiu Moldovan	14		Știința Cluj
**1958–59**	**Div A**	11th	22	2	11	9	23	36	**15**	R16					(Romania) Horațiu Moldovan	6		Știința Cluj
**1959–60**	**Div A**	5th	22	7	10	5	34	32	**24**	QF					(Romania) Viorel Mateianu	7		Știința Cluj
**1960–61**	**Div A**	4th	26	12	5	9	47	44	**29**	R32					(Romania) Viorel Mateianu/Paul Marcu	11		Știința Cluj
**1961–62**	**Div A**	7th	26	10	6	10	46	44	**26**	R32					(Romania) Paul Marcu	13		Știința Cluj
**1962–63**	**Div A**	4th	27	11	7	9	42	44	**29**	R32					(Romania) Mihai Adam	15		Știința Cluj
**1963–64**	**Div A**	9th	26	11	2	13	39	38	**24**	R32					(Romania) Ion Mureșan	11		Știința Cluj
**1964–65**	**Div A**	7th	26	9	6	11	40	38	**24**	**W**					(Romania) **Mihai Adam**	**18**		Știința Cluj
**1965–66**	**Div A**	7th	26	8	10	8	34	35	**26**	R16	CWC	2R			(Romania) Mihai Adam	8		Știința Cluj
**1966–67**	**Div A**	6th	26	9	8	9	31	30	**26**	R32					(Romania) Zoltán Ivansuc	9		Universitatea Cluj
**1967–68**	**Div A**	10th	26	10	5	11	36	37	**25**	R16					(Romania) **Mihai Adam**	**15**		Universitatea Cluj
**1968–69**	**Div A**	8th	30	13	4	13	47	39	**30**	QF					(Romania) Vasile Oprea	18		Universitatea Cluj
**1969–70**	**Div A**	11th	30	9	10	11	40	37	**28**	R16					(Romania) Mihai Adam	11		Universitatea Cluj
**1970–71**	**Div A**	12th	30	10	9	11	36	35	**29**	SF					(Romania) Mihai Adam	12		Universitatea Cluj
**1971–72**	**Div A**	3rd	30	16	5	9	39	27	**37**	R16					(Romania) Mihai Adam	10		Universitatea Cluj
**1972–73**	**Div A**	16th	30	7	9	14	25	50	**23**	QF	UEFA	1R			(Romania) Viorel Mureșan	6		Universitatea Cluj
**1973–74**	**Div A**	10th	34	12	9	13	35	37	**33**	QF					(Romania) Viorel Mureșan	8		Universitatea Cluj
**1974–75**	**Div A**	12th	34	12	9	13	29	38	**33**	QF					(Romania) Alexa Uifăleanu	7		Universitatea Cluj
**1975–76**	**Div A**	18th	34	8	3	23	30	45	**19**	R16					(Romania) Ion Batacliu	8		Universitatea Cluj
**1976–77**	Div B	12th	34	14	4	16	37	40	**32**	p					(Romania) Septimiu Câmpeanu	7		Universitatea Cluj
**1977–78**	Div B	3rd	34	21	5	8	71	27	**47**	p					(Romania) Vasile Vidican	16		Universitatea Cluj
**1978–79**	Div B	**1st**	34	21	4	9	73	23	**46**	R32					(Romania) Septimiu Câmpeanu	19		Universitatea Cluj
**1979–80**	**Div A**	12th	34	14	4	16	44	43	**32**	R16					(Romania) **Septimiu Câmpeanu**	**24**		Universitatea Cluj
**1980–81**	**Div A**	14th	34	14	4	16	47	57	**32**	R16					(Romania) Septimiu Câmpeanu	19		Universitatea Cluj
**1981–82**	**Div A**	16th	34	11	8	15	34	49	**30**	R16					(Romania) Septimiu Câmpeanu	11		Universitatea Cluj
**1982–83**	Div B	3rd	34	19	3	12	61	26	**41**	R32					(Romania) Nicolae Bucur	14		Universitatea Cluj
**1983–84**	Div B	2nd	34	25	1	8	78	25	**51**	p					(Romania) Cornel Fâșic	21		Universitatea Cluj
**1984–85**	Div B	**1st**	34	20	10	4	68	23	**50**	p					(Romania) Septimiu Câmpeanu	11		Universitatea Cluj
**1985–86**	**Div A**	7th	34	14	5	15	51	52	**33**	R16					(Romania) Septimiu Câmpeanu	12		Universitatea Cluj
**1986–87**	**Div A**	10th	34	14	4	16	54	47	**32**	R32					(Romania) Septimiu Câmpeanu	12		Universitatea Cluj
**1987–88**	**Div A**	10th	34	11	7	16	39	54	**29**	R32					(Romania) Septimiu Câmpeanu	11		Universitatea Cluj
**1988–89**	**Div A**	14th	34	11	8	15	43	55	**30**	R32					(Romania) Zoltán Kádár	9		Universitatea Cluj
**1989–90**	**Div A**	13th	34	10	9	15	40	60	**29**	R32					(Romania) Imre Bíró	9		Universitatea Cluj
**1990–91**	**Div A**	18th	34	5	6	23	26	67	**16**	R16					(Romania) Marian Alexandru	6		Universitatea Cluj
**1991–92**	Div B	**1st**	34	26	7	1	82	10	**57**	p					(Romania) Nicolae Ilea	16		Universitatea Cluj
**1992–93**	**Div A**	11th	34	14	2	18	43	51	**30**	QF					(Romania) Marius Predatu	14		Universitatea Cluj
**1993–94**	**Div A**	12th	34	11	9	14	39	42	**31**	SF					(Romania) Marius Predatu	13		Universitatea Cluj
**1994–95**	**Div A**	12th	34	13	4	17	39	42	**43**	SF					(Romania) Marius Predatu	9		Universitatea Cluj
**1995–96**	**Div A**	9th	34	14	6	14	41	40	**48**	R32	IT	GS			(Romania) Radu Sabo	12		Universitatea Cluj
**1996–97**	**Div A**	15th	34	11	6	17	52	67	**39**	QF					(Romania) Ovidiu Maier	8		Universitatea Cluj
**1997–98**	**Div A**	13th	34	11	7	16	42	40	**40**	R32			League Cup	F	(Romania) Marius Popescu	9		Universitatea Cluj
**1998–99**	**Div A**	17th	34	4	4	26	19	92	**16**	R16					(Romania) Marius Predatu	5		Universitatea Cluj
**1999–00**	Div B	17th	34	6	6	22	30	76	**24**	4R					(Romania) Daniel Dăscălescu/Adrian Trușcă	5		Universitatea Cluj
**2000–01**	Div C	**1st**	28	20	5	3	65	19	**65**	p					(Romania) Alexandru Păcurar	11		Universitatea Cluj
**2001–02**	Div B	10th	30	11	7	12	51	40	**40**	p					(Romania) Ciprian Prodan	12		Universitatea Cluj
**2002–03**	Div B	9th	28	8	10	10	48	44	**34**	p					(Romania) Dan Codreanu	14		Universitatea Cluj
**2003–04**	Div B	6th	30	15	7	8	49	28	**52**	p					(Romania) Răzvan Cociş	12		Universitatea Cluj
**2004–05**	Div B	7th	28	12	4	12	41	33	**40**	R16					(Romania) Emil Jula	11		Universitatea Cluj
**2005–06**	Div B	3rd	28	15	9	4	44	16	**54**	4R					(Romania) Dorin Goga	9		Universitatea Cluj
**2006–07**	L2	**1st**	34	21	9	4	49	21	**72**	R32					(Romania) Radu Sabo	10		Universitatea Cluj
**2007–08**	**L1**	18th	34	4	11	19	32	58	**23**	R16					(Romania) Dorin Goga	8		Universitatea Cluj
**2008–09**	L2	14th	34	11	12	11	37	33	**43**	R32					(Romania) Flavius Băd	9		Universitatea Cluj
**2009–10**	L2	2nd	32	20	7	5	60	24	**67**	4R					(Romania) Valentin Lemnaru	13		Universitatea Cluj
**2010–11**	**L1**	8th	34	13	8	13	48	54	**47**	R16					(Romania) Claudiu Niculescu	13		Universitatea Cluj
**2011–12**	**L1**	7th	34	11	14	9	46	37	**47**	R32					(Romania) Adrian Cristea	8		Universitatea Cluj
**2012–13**	**L1**	12th	34	10	8	16	39	55	**38**	R32					(Romania) Viorel Dinu	9		Universitatea Cluj
**2013–14**	**L1**	11th	34	11	7	16	29	46	**40**	R32					(Romania) Valentin Lemnaru	13		Universitatea Cluj
**2014–15**	**L1**	15th	34	8	11	15	29	41	**35**	F			League Cup	QF	(Cameroon) Justin Mengolo	5		Universitatea Cluj
**2015–16**	L2	10th	26	13	5	8	30	15	**44**	R32					(Romania) Octavian Ursu	8		Universitatea Cluj
**2015–16**	L2	10th	10	3	3	4	11	13	**28**	R32					(Romania) Octavian Ursu	8		Universitatea Cluj
**2016–17**	L4	**1st**	28	27	1	0	167	9	**82**	2R			Cluj County Phase	**W**	(Romania) Brian Lemac	48		Universitatea Cluj
**2017–18**	L3	**1st**	28	24	2	2	88	16	**74**	R16					(Romania) Dorin Goga	16		Universitatea Cluj
**2018–19**	L2	3rd	38	25	7	6	85	26	**82**	R16					(Romania) Cristian Gavra	22		Universitatea Cluj
**2019–20**	L2	14th	23	5	12	6	29	26	**27**	R16					(Romania) Dorin Goga	5		Universitatea Cluj
**2020–21**	L2	11th	20	10	2	8	24	20	**29**	QF					(Israel) Idan Golan	5		Universitatea Cluj
**2021–22**	L2	**3rd**	29	18	3	8	47	23	**57**	4R					(Moldova) Alexandru Boiciuc	6		Universitatea Cluj
**2022–23**	L1	10th	30	8	10	12	25	37	**34**	F					(Senegal) Mamadou Thiam	9		Universitatea Cluj
**2022–23**	L1	10th	9	5	1	3	12	9	**33**	F					(Senegal) Mamadou Thiam	9		Universitatea Cluj
**2023–24**	L1	10th	30	10	12	8	35	38	**42**	SF					(Romania) Dan Nistor	11		Universitatea Cluj
**2023–24**	L1	10th	9	3	3	3	12	10	**33**	SF					(Romania) Dan Nistor	11		Universitatea Cluj
**2024–25**	L1	4th	30	14	10	6	43	27	**52**	PO					(Romania) Vladislav Blănuță	12		Universitatea Cluj
**2024–25**	L1	4th	10	4	1	5	12	15	**39**	PO					(Romania) Vladislav Blănuță	12		Universitatea Cluj
**2025–26**	L1	2nd	30	16	6	8	48	27	**54**	F	UECL	2QR			(Bosnia and Herzegovina) **Jovo Lukić**	**18**		Universitatea Cluj
**2025–26**	L1	2nd	10	6	1	3	13	11	**46**	F	UECL	2QR			(Bosnia and Herzegovina) **Jovo Lukić**	**18**		Universitatea Cluj

== Notable former players ==
The footballers enlisted below have had international cap(s) for their respective countries at junior and/or senior level. Players whose name is listed in bold represented their countries at junior and/or senior level on through the time's passing. Additionally, these players have also had a significant number of caps and goals accumulated throughout a certain number of seasons for the club itself as well.

One-club men

- (Romania) Traian Georgescu
- (Romania) Mircea Luca
- (Romania) Cristinel Pojar
- (Romania) Zsolt Szilágyi

Romania

- (Romania) Octavian Abrudan
- (Romania) Mihai Adam
- (Romania) **Dan Anca**
- (Romania) Laur Aștilean
- (Romania) **Imre Bíró**
- (Romania) Mircea Bornescu
- (Romania) Aurel Boroș
- (Romania) Gabriel Boştină
- (Romania) Dan Bucşa
- (Romania) Remus Câmpeanu
- (Romania) **Septimiu Câmpeanu**
- (Romania) **Horațiu Cioloboc**
- (Romania) **Raul Ciupe**
- (Romania) **Andrei Coubiș**
- (Romania) **Sever Coracu**
- (Romania) **Marcel Coraş**
- (Romania) **Nicolae David**
- (Romania) **Anton Doboş**
- (Romania) Bogdan Dolha
- (Romania) **Vasile Dobrău**
- (Romania) Francisc Dican
- (Romania) Adrian Falub
- (Romania) Ioan Filip
- (Romania) **George Florescu**
- (Romania) Romulus Gabor
- (Romania) **Vasile Gain**
- (Romania) **Dorin Goga**
- (Romania) **Aurel Guga**
- (Romania) **Elemer Hirsch**
- (Romania) **Ovidiu Hoban**
- (Romania) **Octavian Ionescu**
- (Romania) **Zoltán Ivansuc**
- (Romania) Emil Jula
- (Romania) Vasile Jula
- (Romania) Marcel Lăzăreanu

Romania

- (Romania) Valentin Lemnaru
- (Romania) **Srdjan Luchin**
- (Romania) **Paul Marcu**
- (Romania) **Viorel Mateianu**
- (Romania) Alpar Meszaros
- (Romania) **Bogdan Mitrea**
- (Romania) **Sebastian Moga**
- (Romania) Laurențiu Moldovan
- (Romania) Lică Movilă
- (Romania) **Andrei Mureșan**
- (Romania) Alexandru Mustățea
- (Romania) **Zsolt Muzsnay**
- (Romania) **Cătălin Necula**
- (Romania) Mircea Neşu
- (Romania) **Claudiu Niculescu**
- (Romania) **Cornel Orza**
- (Romania) **Emil Petru**
- (Romania) **Silviu Ploeșteanu**
- (Romania) Adrian Popa
- (Romania) **Octavian Popescu**
- (Romania) **Marius Predatu**
- (Romania) **Florin Prunea**
- (Romania) **Ioan Sabău**
- (Romania) Radu Sabo
- (Romania) **Graţian Sepi**
- (Romania) **Andrei Sepci**
- (Romania) **Lazăr Sfera**
- (Romania) Rareş Soporan
- (Romania) **Constantin Ștefan**
- (Romania) **Ioan Suciu**
- (Romania) **Alexandru Suciu**
- (Romania) Marius Suller
- (Romania) János Székely
- (Romania) Emil Szolomajer
- (Romania) **Gabriel Tamaș**
- (Romania) **Alin Toșca**
- (Romania) Alexa Uifăleanu
- (Romania) Bogdan Unguruşan
- (Romania) Călin Zanc
- (Romania) **Dorin Zotincă**

Belgium

- (Belgium) Martin Remacle

Brazil

- (Brazil) **Fábio Bilica**
- (Brazil) Gabriel Machado
- (Brazil) Romário Pires

Bulgaria

- (Bulgaria) **Plamen Iliev**

Cape Verde

- (Cape Verde) **Kay**

Cyprus

- (Cyprus) **Paraskevas Christou**

Guinea

- (Guinea) **Habib Baldé**

Italy

- (Italy) Marco Fossati

Lithuania

- (Lithuania) **Edvinas Gertmonas**

Montenegro

- (Montenegro) **Milan Jovanović**

Nigeria

- (Nigeria) **Anthony Nwakaeme**

Poland

- (Poland) **Łukasz Szukała**

Portugal

- (Portugal) Sérgio Ribeiro
- (Portugal) **Nuno Viveiros**

Senegal

- (Senegal) Gaston Mendy
- (Senegal) **Mamadou Thiam**

Slovakia

- (Slovakia) Robert Veselovsky

South Korea

- (South Korea) **Park Jae-hong**

== Former managers ==
- (Romania) Adalbert Kovács (1932)
- (Austria) Otto Eckhardt (1933)
- (Hungary) Adalbert Molnár (1933–34)
- (Austria) Fritsch (1934–35)
- (Romania) Iosif Kovács (1935–36)
- (Austria) Otto Eckhardt (1936)
- (Romania) Janos Szaniszló (1937)
- (Romania) Adalbert Kovács (1937–38)
- (Romania) Janos Szaniszló (1938)
- (Romania) Onoriu Chețanu (1938)
- (Hungary) Ferenc Nyúl (1938–39)
- (Romania) Janos Szaniszló (1939–40)
- (Romania) Iosif Kovács (1940–41)
- (Romania) Onoriu Chețanu (1941–42)
- (Austria) Maertens (1942–1944)
- (Hungary) Markos Imre (1946)
- (Romania) Nicolae Kovács (1946–47)
- (Romania) Nicolae Munteanu (1947–48)
- (Romania) Ștefan Cârjan (1948)
- (Romania) Andrei Sepci (1949)
- (Romania) Iuliu Baratky (1949–51)
- (Romania) Gheorghe Bărbulescu (1951)
- (Romania) Ștefan Kovács (1952–53)
- (Romania) Vasile Gain (1953)
- (Romania) Ștefan Kovács (1954–55)
- (Romania) Petre Rădulescu (1955)
- (Romania) Ștefan Kovács (1956)
- (Romania) Nicolae Munteanu (1956)
- (Romania) Nicolae Szoboszlay (1957)
- (Romania) Ștefan Kovács (1957–58)
- (Romania) Virgil Mărdărescu (1958–59)
- (Romania) Andrei Sepci (1959–61)
- (Romania) Neța Gheorghe (1961–62)
- (Romania) Constantin Rădulescu (1962–63)
- (Romania) Andrei Sepci (1963)
- (Romania) Mircea Luca (1964)
- (Romania) Andrei Sepci (1964–66)
- (Romania) Eugen Mladin (1966–67)
- (Romania) Constantin Teașcă (1967)
- (Romania) Nicolae Szoboszlay (1967)
- (Romania) Constantin Teașcă (1968)
- (Romania) Ștefan Cârjan (1969–70)
- (Romania) Silviu Avram (1970)
- (Romania) Andrei Sepci (1970–71)
- (Romania) Vasile Băluțiu (1971)
- (Romania) Ștefan Onisie (1971–73)
- (Romania) Mircea Luca (1973)
- (Romania) Silviu Avram (1973–74)
- (Romania) Vasile Băluțiu (1974–75)
- (Romania) Paul Popescu (1975–76)
- (Romania) Constantin Rădulescu (1976–77)
- (Romania) Petre Moldoveanu (1977–78)
- (Romania) Toader Pop (1979)
- (Romania) Gheorghe Staicu (1980–81)
- (Romania) Angelo Niculescu (1981–83)
- (Romania) Constantin Ardeleanu (1983)
- (Romania) Remus Vlad (1983–85)
- (Romania) Alexa Uifăleanu (1985)
- (Romania) Remus Vlad (1985–88)
- (Romania) Cornel Dinu (1989)
- (Romania) Dan Anca (October 1989 – March 1990)
- (Romania) Ștefan Sameș (1990)
- (Romania) Ion Ciocan (1990)
- (Romania) Vasile Iordache (1990)
- (Romania) Ioan Sdrobiș (1991–92)
- (Romania) Remus Vlad (1992–93)
- (Romania) Dan Anca (1993–94)
- (Romania) Ioan Andone (1994–95)
- (Romania) Dan Anca (1995–97)
- (Romania) Adrian Coca (1997)
- (Romania) Cornel Țălnar (1997–98)
- (Romania) Tiberiu Poraczky (1998)
- (Romania) Dan Anca (Dec 1998–99)
- (Romania) Marcel Lăzăreanu (1999)
- (Romania) Grigore Boca (1999)
- (Romania) Alexa Uifăleanu (1999)
- (Romania) Zoltan Iașko (1999)
- (Romania) Petre Gigiu (2000)
- (Romania) Mircea Cojocaru (2000)
- (Romania) Ioan Ovidiu Sabău (2000–01)
- (Romania) Mihai Marian (2001)
- (Romania) Cristian Mustacă (2001)
- (Romania) Vasile Gheorghe (2002)
- (Romania) Dan Anca (2002)
- (Romania) Vasile Gheorghe (2002)
- (Romania) Dan Anca (2002–03)
- (Romania) Ioan Ovidiu Sabău (2003)
- (Romania) Mircea Cojocaru (2003 – 4 July 2004)
- (Romania) Marin Ion (July 2004 – 5 July 2005)
- (Romania) Leontin Grozavu (July 2005–06)
- (Romania) Francisc Dican (2006)
- (Romania) Adrian Falub (1 July 2006 – 7 October 2007)
- (Romania) Gheorghe Mulțescu (19 October 2007 – 16 December 2007)
- (Romania) Alpar Meszaros (8 January 2008 – 20 August 2008)
- (Romania) Marius Popescu (August 2008)
- (Romania) Dorinel Munteanu (26 August 2008 – 26 October 2008)
- (Romania) Gheorghe Mihali (October 2008 – 9 April 2009)
- (Romania) Marius Popescu (2009)
- (Romania) Dorinel Munteanu (2009 – 30 June 2009)
- (Italy) Carmelo Palilla (July 2009 – 9 August)
- (Romania) Marius Popescu (August 2009)
- (Romania) Cornel Țălnar (29 August 2009 – 4 October 2009)
- (Romania) Cristian Dulca (5 October 2009 – 2010)
- (Romania) Viorel Hizo (2010)
- (Romania) Cristian Dulca (2010)
- (Romania) Marian Pană (16 June 2010 – 8 November 2010)
- (Romania) Claudiu Niculescu (November 2010)
- (Romania) Ionuț Badea (19 November 2010 – 14 March 2012)
- (Romania) Claudiu Niculescu (14 March 2012 – 23 July 2012)
- (Romania) Cristian Dulca (26 July 2012 – 1 October 2012)
- (Romania) Marius Popescu (interim) (1 October 2012 – 8 November 2012)
- (Romania) Marius Șumudică (9 November 2012 – 15 November 2012)
- (Romania) Marius Popescu (15 November 2012 – 1 February 2013)
- (Romania) Ionel Ganea (1 February 2013 – 30 September 2013)
- (Romania) Gheorghe Barbu (interim) (2 October 2013 – 23 October 2013)
- (Romania) Mihai Teja (23 October 2013 – 4 September 2014)
- (Romania) George Ogăraru (4 September 2014 – 2 March 2015)
- (Romania) Adrian Falub (2 March 2015 – 30 June 2015)
- (Romania) Marius Popescu (27 July 2015 – 27 October 2015)
- (Romania) Mihai Teja (29 October 2015 – 9 April 2016)
- (Romania) Zsolt Szilágyi (2016)
- (Romania) Ovidiu Sărmăşan^{c} (2016)
- (Romania) Marius Popescu (1 July 2016 – 16 September 2017)
- (Romania) Adrian Falub (20 September 2017 – 18 October 2018)
- (Romania) Mircea Cojocaru^{c} (19 October 2018 – 8 December 2018)
- (Romania) Bogdan Lobonț (8 December 2018 – 14 June 2019)
- (Romania) Cristian Dulca (20 June 2019 – 2 September 2019)
- (Romania) Adrian Falub (4 September 2019 – 14 September 2020)
- (Romania) Costel Enache (17 September 2020 – 10 May 2021)
- (Romania) Erik Lincar (11 May 2021 – 24 August 2022)
- (Romania) Eugen Neagoe (25 August 2022 – 31 December 2022)
- (Romania) Ioan Ovidiu Sabău (1 January 2023 – 30 May 2023)
- (Romania) Anton Petrea (9 June 2023 – 24 August 2023)
- (Romania) Ioan Ovidiu Sabău (24 August 2023 – 18 October 2025)
