= 1964–65 Cupa României =

Tournament details
- Country: Romania

Final positions
- Champions: Știința Cluj
- Runners-up: Dinamo Pitești

The 1964–65 Cupa României was the 27th edition of Romania's most prestigious football cup competition.

The title was won by Știința Cluj against Dinamo Pitești.

== Format ==
The competition is an annual knockout tournament.

In the first round proper, 2 pots were made, first pot with Divizia A teams and other teams till 16 and the second pot with the rest of teams qualified in this phase. Each tie is played as a single leg.

First round proper matches are played on the ground of the lowest ranked team, then from the second round proper the matches are played on a neutral location.

In the first round proper, if a match is drawn after 90 minutes, the game goes in extra time, and if the scored is still tight after 120 minutes, the team who played away will qualify.

From the second round proper, if a match is drawn after 90 minutes, the game goes in extra time, and if the scored is still tight after 120 minutes, then the younger team (the lower average of players age) will qualify.

From the first edition, the teams from Divizia A entered in competition in 16 finals, rule which remained till today.

== First round proper ==
Team 1	Score	Team 2
6 March 1965
Textila Buhuși (Div. C)	0–1	(Div. A) Dinamo Pitești
Recolta Carei (Div. B)	0–1	(Div. A) Farul Constanța
Clujeana Cluj (Div. B)	0–1 (a.e.t.)	(Div. B) ASA 1962 Târgu Mureș
AS Cugir (Div. B)	0–1	(Div. A) UTA Arad
Știința Galați (Div. B)	0–3	(Div. A) Dinamo București
Victoria Giurgiu (Div. C)	0–1	(Div. A) Minerul Baia Mare
Minerul Lupeni (Div. B)	3–0	(Div. A) ASA Crișul Oradea
Marina Mangalia (Div. C)	0–0 (a.e.t.)	(Div. A) CSMS Iași
Olimpia Oradea (Div. C)	0–1	(Div. A) Progresul București
Metalul Pitești (Div. C)	1–2	(Div. A) Petrolul Ploiești
Metalul Rădăuți (Div. C)	0–5	(Div. A) Steagul Roșu Brașov
CSM Reșița (Div. B)	1–2	(Div. A) Știința Cluj
CFR Roșiori (Div. B)	1–0	(Div. B) Flacăra Moreni
Metalul Târgoviște (Div. B)	2–1 (a.e.t.)	(Div. A) Știința Craiova
Arieșul Turda (Div. C)	1–8	(Div. A) Steaua București
8 March 1965
Siderurgistul Galați (Div. B)	0–3	(Div. A) Rapid București

== Second round proper ==
Team 1	Score	Team 2
17 March 1965
Știința Cluj	2–1	Farul Constanța
Rapid București	5–0	CFR Roșiori
Dinamo Pitești	2–1	Steagul Roșu Brașov
ASA 1962 Târgu Mureș	3–1	Minerul Baia Mare
Dinamo București	1–0	Petrolul Ploiești
CSMS Iași	2–1	Steaua București
Progresul București	2–0 (a.e.t.)	Minerul Lupeni
Metalul Târgoviște	1–0	UTA Arad

== Quarter-finals ==
Team 1	Score	Team 2
30 June 1965
Progresul București	4–1	CSMS Iași
Dinamo București	5–0	Metalul Târgoviște
Dinamo Pitești	1–1 (a.e.t.)	Rapid București
Știința Cluj	3–1	ASA 1962 Târgu Mureș

== Semi-finals ==
Team 1	Score	Team 2
4 July 1965
Știința Cluj	2–2 (a.e.t.)	Progresul București
Dinamo Pitești	1–0	Dinamo București

== Final ==
11 July 1965
17:30 EET

Știința Cluj	2–1	Dinamo Pitești
Câmpeanu 11'; Ivansuc 55'	Report	Țurcan 65'

Republicii, Bucharest
Attendance: 30,000
Referee: Nicolae Mihăilescu (Bucharest)

Cupa României 1964–65 winners

1st title
