= History of FC Rapid București =

The history of FC Rapid București covers the time between the foundation of Rapid București, a Romanian football club based in Bucharest, up to the present day.

Rapid was founded on 25 June 1923 by the employees of the Grivița workshops, Domestically, Rapid București is one of the most successful clubs in the country, having won three national titles, 13 Cupa României and four Supercupa României. Internationally, its highest achievements are reaching the quarter-finals of the 1972–73 Cup Winners' Cup and of the 2005–06 UEFA Cup, and the final of the 1940 Mitropa Cup, the latter not being played because of the Second World War. Recently, the club was declared bankrupt in 2016, but was refounded and managed to return to the top flight in 2021.

== Foundation and early years ==
At the beginning of 1912, the foundations of the Victoria București project were laid, which represented the first attempt to create a football club for Bucharest ceferists. But after the start of the world war, the project was abandoned. Then, about 10 years later, from Ateliere Grivița Locomotive, the foundations were laid for a team called Locomotive itself, founded on July 1, 1922. Which had cherry shirts, made from the tablecloths and the curtains of the restaurant cars of the trains that came for repairs.

On 25 June 1923, in a classroom of the primary school from the Grivița neighborhood, Bucharest, the employees of the Grivița workshops created Asociația Culturală și Sportivă CFR ("CFR Cultural and Sports Association"). Teofil Copaci was chosen as the president of the association, while Grigore Grigoriu became the first captain of the team. The squad was formed in September, following the merger of the Ateliere and Excelsior teams. The first equipment was made out of burgundy fabric in the house of Grigoriu.

On 28 October 1923, the team played its first game against Unirea Timișoara, which it was lost 4–8. The second match, played over ten days, was against Gloria Arad, lost 1–2. In 1925, the team was excluded from the championship for not showing up to matches. The reasons for the absences were the lack of equipment and the impossibility of gathering 11 players. Until 1932 CFR played in the Bucharest Championship, not qualifying in the final tournament of the national league. During this period, the leaders of the team were: Teofil Copaci, Grigore Grigoriu and Bozie Codreanu; from the group of players were part: Stănică, Tudor, Molnar, Ştefănescu, Foran, Leoveanu, Constantinescu, Fetzko, Georgescu, Albert, Block, Filip, Itu I, Itu II, Pîrvulescu, Cichi, Schileriu, Svetcovschi, Oros, Ujlaki, Pop, Dobrescu I, Kelemen, Vlaiculescu, Ispas, Vintilescu and Petrovici.

"- Ce zici, Geza, daca am face si noi o echipa de fotbal? – Sa-ncercam, Grigore…"

— 11 iunie 1923, Bucharest

"- What do you say, Geza, if we also make a football team? - Let's try, Grigore..."

— June 11, 1923, Bucharest

After several years of competing in the regional championship of Bucharest, the club entered in the Divizia A by the start of the 1932–33 season. During the pre-war years, Rapid was one of Romania's top teams, regularly winning the cup but never the championship although they came close.

== Golden years ==
After promotion from the district to the first division in 1932, Rapid began to become one of the top Romanian teams with record performances in Romanian football, winning six consecutive Romanian cups represented a record that has not been broken until today and also being the first Romanian team to qualify for the final of an international cup. This period of the club is considered the golden period of the team along with the generation of the 60s

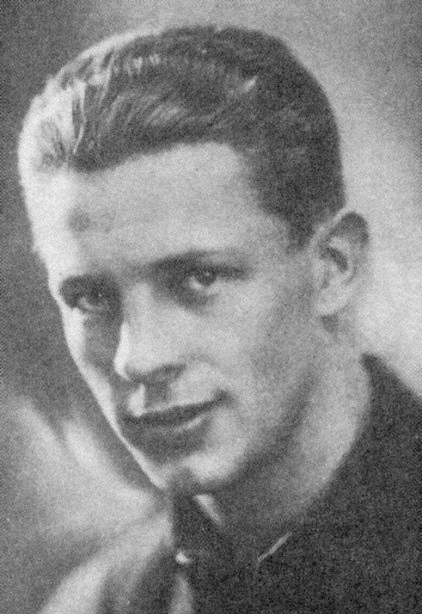
Iuliu Baratky, a true landmark in the club's history, nicknamed "The Blonde Wonder of Giulești".

An interesting story was recorded when Rapid lost the title because of their fair play. One of Rapid's players touched the ball with his hand in the penalty area during a decisive match against Venus București, in the conditions in which Rapid needed a win to finish first in the league. In the first instance the referee didn't see the incident, but when he heard the audience protesting asked the player if he touched the ball with his hand, the player admitted. Venus converted the penalty and managed to draw 1–1 and to finish first in the league, instead of "the Railwaymen". The positions that have been achieved in those years in the Divizia A: 1932–33 – 2nd (Seria I), 1933–34 – 4th (Seria I), 1934–35 – 10th, 1935–36 – 7th, 1936–37 – 2nd, 1937–38 – 1st (Seria I), in this season the team qualified in the national championship final, which was played against Ripensia Timișoara, but Giuleștenii lost both legs with 0–2, 1938–39 – 6th, 1939–40 – 2nd and 1940–41 – 2nd. The first success came in 1935, CFR Bucharest winning the Romanian Cup after a fairytale final with Ripensia Timisoara. 6-5 for Ceferists, and the man of the match was Gheorghe Georgescu with a triple scored in 15 minutes.

In 1936, the European forum, frightened by the expansion of Soviet formations, supported by trade unions, decided that this kind of teams could no longer play in the first divisions of their countries. Quickly, like other clubs in Romania, it had to change its status. a Jewish lawyer appeared, born in Timișoara, Costică Bauer, who had also lived in Vienna for several years and was involved in football, on various commissions, since the 20s.

Costică Bauer took advantage of the situation and, because she had connections in Vienna, went and took all the equipment from Rapid Vienna, including the juniors. He came home with a wagonload of equipment, which he gave to the CFR. So, on November 23, 1936, the name CFR changed to Rapid as a sign of gratitude to the Austrian club.

Period	Name
1923–1936	CFR București
1936–1945	Rapid București
1945–1950	CFR București
1950–1958	Locomotiva București
1958–2016	Rapid București
2016–2017	Mişcarea Feroviară CFR București
2017–2018	Academia Rapid București
2018–2019	Fotbal Club R București
2019–present	Fotbal Club Rapid 1923

On the other hand, Rapid won seven Romanian Cups in that period (1934–35, 1936–37, 1937–38, 1938–39, 1939–40, 1940–41, 1941–42), six of them in consecutive years, being the club's most successful time in this competition. Following players were part of the Romanian Cup winner teams: Roșculeț, Ujlaki, Vintilă, Wetzer II, Rășinaru, Cuedan, Barbu II, Rădulescu, Bogdan, Auer, Moldoveanu, Baratky, Raffinsky, Lengheriu, I.Costea, Sipos, Gavrilescu, Sadowski, Silvăț, Ghiurițan, Wetzer III and Florian, among others. It was the period when the rivalry between CFR and Venus Bucharest intensified, the two teams sharing their trophies, the Venusists winning the championship, and the Ceferists dominating the Romanian Cup. The 1940 final between the two combatants remained in the history of the competition, the winner of the trophy was decided after three replays. Iuliu Baratky managing to score in all four matches of the final.

The railway workers were not the selection pool any longer, but a strong supporting audience. Some players were also selected in the national team. During those years, but also during the war, the competition format changed after various reorganizations and Rapid won the Bessarabia Cup, in 1942. The strangest of all might be the qualification in the final of the Mitropa Cup (precursor of the UEFA Champions League) at a moment when the competition was taking its last breath. The second place obtained in the 1939-1940 edition of the championship, Rapid again took part in the Mitropa Cup.

Budapest, June 16, 1940. 15,000 spectators sat in the stands of the Hungária körúti stadion and rejoiced when the favorites opened the scoring. However, Vilmos Sipos equalized for Rapid until the break and he also brought, in the second half, a great victory for the Bucharest team. The first success of a Romanian team in Hungary. Those who wrote this important piece of history were: Petre Rădulescu - Iosif Slivatz, Iosif Lengheriu - Vintilă Cossini, Gheorghe Rășinaru, Ioachim Moldoveanu - Vilim Šipoš, Ioan Wetzer, Iuliu Barátky, Dan Gavrilescu, Ion Bogdan. Coach: Stefan Auer. After only a week came the return from "ANEF". Where quickly Bucharest managed to beat the club 3-0 through the goals of Vilmos Sipos, Ion Bogdan and Iuliu Barátky. After the match in Hungary, Rapid met Gradjanski Zagreb, which they passed and reached the final of the Mitropa Cup, where they were supposed to meet Ferencváros . However, due to the events of World War II it was cancelled.

== The Railwaymen: a solid team ==
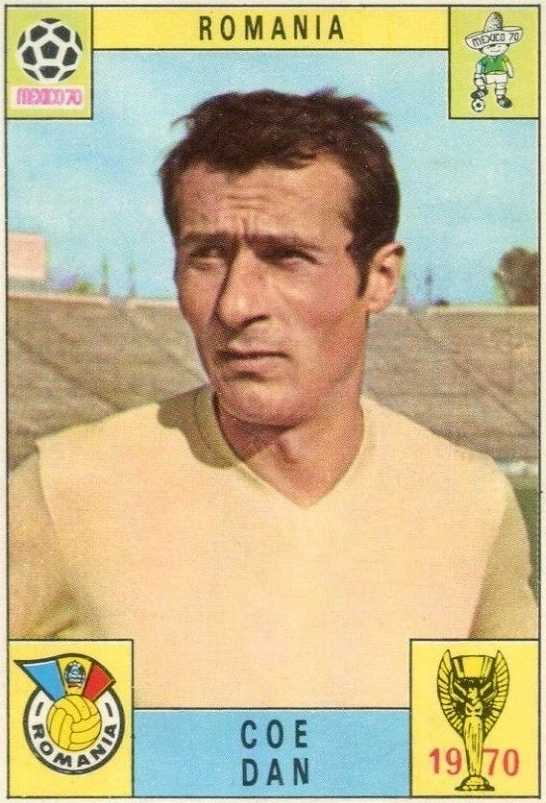
Dan Coe, captain of the squad that won the first title, also a symbol of the club, being presently in fans' songs even today.

After the war, Rapid returned to the Bucharest Championship in the 1945–46 season, finally finishing 4th. After this season the club returned to its old name, CFR (Căile Ferate Române – Romanian Railways), and entered in the 1946–47 Divizia A season, the first official national season after the end of the war, ending 5th, two points away from the second place (Carmen București) and 13 from the 1st place (ITA Arad). In the following season, 1947–48, the team finished 3rd, behind CFR Timişoara and ITA Arad. In the 1948–49 season "the White and Burgundies" finished 2nd at only five points behind IC Oradea. Also on 20 March 1949, CFR București obtained the biggest victory in its entire history, 12–2 against CFR Cluj.

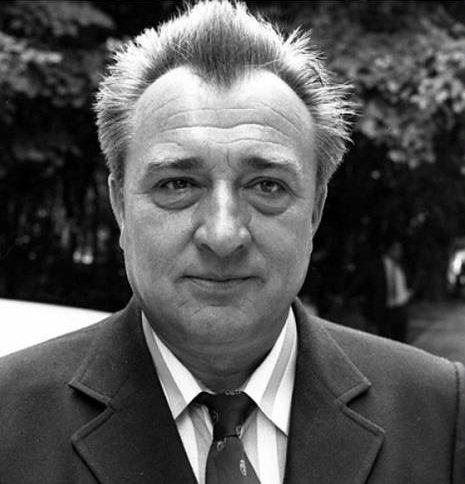
Valentin Stănescu, the coach that won the title with Rapid in 1967, also a former player of the club and a symbol, the stadium was renamed after him.

The 1950s started with a change of the system format, from the autumn-spring to the spring-autumn one, as an influence of the communist regime installed in the country after 1945. In the 1950 season Rapid became Locomotiva, a name much closer to the Soviet version, Lokomotiv, change imposed for all the teams that belonged to the Romanian Railways, but Giuleștenii finished again on the 2nd place. The first relegation came in 1951 when the club was ranked 11th, losing to the goal difference, a fight in three, against Locomotiva Târgu Mureș and Știința Timișoara. Promoted one year later, from the first place, with 10 points over the second-ranked (Locomotiva Iași), would finish the 1953 season in 5th place. In 1954 season Locomotiva relegated for the second time, occupying the 12th place. "The White and Burgundies" returned however after only one year in the Divizia A, following a good period for the team including a 4th-place ranking at the end of 1956, only 5 points behind the first position (CCA București).

From the 1957–58 season, the Romanian football returned to the autumn-spring system and "the Railwaymen" finished at the middle of the table, 8th, out of 12. The end of the Soviet system meant also the end of the Soviet names and in 1958 they returned to the Austrian inspired name of Rapid. In the following years the team finished 4th and 10th at the end of the 1958–59 and 1959–60 seasons.

In the 1950s the squad included following players: V. Stănescu, Gh. Dungu, Gh.Demeter, D. Macri, I.Mihăilescu, C.Simionescu, N.Cristescu, I.Ruzici, C.Socec, I.Lungu, B. Marian, A.Rădulescu, A.Ferenczi, Şt. Filotti, N.Roman, E.Avasilchioaie, D.Călin, L.Coman, A.Todor, N.Dodeanu, I.Langa, I.Olaru, S.Zeană and Gh.Milea, among others.

The 1960s was one of the best periods in the history of football from Giulești. In 1961 Rapid reached the final of the Romanian Cup, where they lost against Arieșul Turda, 1–2, for "the White and Burgundy" side scored Nicolae Georgescu in the 24th minute. The result was more surprising as the winning team was, at that time, only a Divizia C member. The following season, Rapid, with a squad coached by Ion Mihăilescu and composed of valuable players such as: Ilie Greavu, Ion Motroc, Dumitru Macri, Titus Ozon, Ion Ionescu or Teofil Codreanu, among others, eliminated one by one: CSM Mediaș, Laminorul Roman, Metalul Târgoviște and Progresul București, but suffered a dramatic defeat in the final, 1–5 against Steaua București, a squad of Steaua which would be recognized over the years as the golden generation of the club.

Rapid's 1966–67 squad.

In most of these seasons, the team was in the top half of the championship, occupying successively following places: 1960–61 – 3rd, 1961–62 – 5th and 1962–63 – 8th. Then followed three seasons for the squad under the Grant Bridge, which finished 2nd, three consecutive seasons: 1963–64 (7 points behind Dinamo București), 1964–65 (1 point behind Dinamo București) and 1965–66 (6 points behind Petrolul Ploiești). Nevertheless, in which they finished right behind their rivals, Dinamo and Petrolul, fact that motivated "the Railwaymen", who obtained, at the end of the 1966–67 season, the highest performance in the history of the club, until that time, first Divizia A title, the first crown of champions that arrived in Giulești ever. This performance was obtained by the following squad: Răducanu Necula, Marin Andrei – Dan Coe, Nicolae Lupescu, Ion Motroc, Ilie Greavu, Constantin Jamaischi – Constantin Dinu-Buric, Nicolae Georgescu, Constantin Năsturescu, Teofil Codreanu, Viorel Kraus – Ion Ionescu, Emil Dumitriu, Alexandru Neagu; Coaches: Valentin Stănescu and Victor Stănculescu. In that season the title was won at a distance of two points away from Dinamo București and the goalscorer of the team was Ion Ionescu, with 15 goals. In the 1967–68 European Cup Rapid eliminated Bulgarian champion, Botev Plovdiv, in the first round, but could not pass by Juventus, 0–1 on aggregate.

After this first success, in the following four seasons, the team occupied, with the exception of the 1967–68 season (when it reached the final of the Romanian Cup which was lost in front of Dinamo with 1–3 after overtime) positions on the podium of the championship: 1968–69 – 3rd and 1969–70 – 2nd.

== Troubled times ==
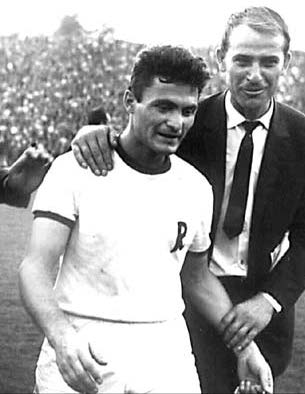
Ilie Greavu, Rapid player until 1971, also ranked second in the appearances table, with 294.

Rapid made a last strong season, 1970–71, finished on the 2nd place, after which it started to slide towards the bottom half of the league table: 1971–72 – 10th and 1972–73 – 14th. Despite these less notable performances, in 1972 Rapid reached the Romanian Cup final under coach Bazil Marian, ex 1950s player of the team, and won 2–0 against Jiul Petroșani, goals scored by Stelian Marin (3rd minute) and Alexandru Neagu (27th minute). In the 1971–72 UEFA Cup season Rapid had important results, eliminating Napoli and Legia Warsaw before being stopped by Tottenham Hotspur, 0–5 on aggregate. The 1972–73 European Cup Winners' Cup was another good European campaign, and after a 3–1 against Landskrona BoIS of Sweden and a 4–2 against Rapid Wien, the team that inspired the Romanian side so much in the past, Rapid was eliminated again by an English side, this time Leeds United, 1–8 on aggregate.

At the end of the 1973–74 season, "the White and Burgundies" finished 16th, at the same number of points with Jiul Petroșani, but this time the club from the Jiu Valley would have won because of a better goal difference, and Rapid relegated surprisingly for the third time in its history, at 7 years from its first national title, proving once again that is a team full of surprises and contrasts. The squad made a strong season and promoted after only one year spent in the second league, after finishing 1st in the 2nd series, at 6 points from the 2nd place, occupied by Progresul București. "The Railwaymen" seemed to want to convince everyone that relegation was nothing but a regrettable error and also won the Romanian Cup in the same season, from the position of a second echelon team. 1974–75 Cupa României campaign was an incredible one, Rapid advanced round by round and eliminated strong teams such as: Dinamo București (2–1), Jiul Petroșani (1–0), Ceahlăul Piatra Neamț (1–0) and Steaua București (1–1, 6–5 on penalties). In the final they encountered Universitatea Craiova, the Divizia A defending champions and also a club that had its first golden generation (known as "The Champion of a Great Love"), led from the pitch by its legend, Ion Oblemenco. Rapid won 2–1, after extra time, goals scored by Nicolae Manea, for Craiova scored Ion Oblemenco.

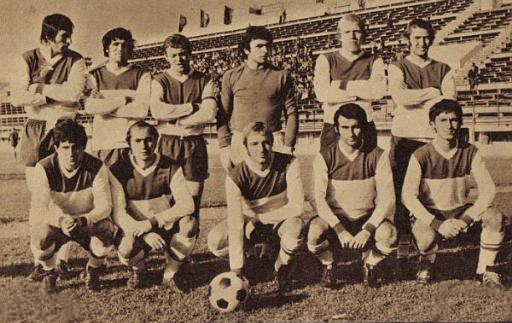
Rapid București team in the 1974–75 season, in which they promoted in the first league and also won the Romanian Cup.

Back in the Divizia A, Rapid made two mediocre seasons: 1975–76 – 14th and 1976–77 – 16th, relegating again, at exactly 10 years from the moment where they were crowned as the champions of Romania. After the relegation began one of the darkest periods in the history of the club under the Grant Bridge, with 6 consecutive Divizia B seasons: 1977–78 – 4th, 1978–79 – 6th, 1979–80 – 2nd, 1980–81 – 3rd, 1981–82 – 2nd and 1982–83 – 1st, this period leading to a fierce rivalry with Petrolul Ploiești and Progresul București. In a match against Progresul, played in 1980, was set also the record of presence for a Divizia B match, over 50,000 spectators. The return to the first division was the merit of coaches Valentin Stănescu (who also brought the first title in 1967) and Viorel Kraus; the group of players consisting of: Ion Gabriel, Manu, Popescu, Paraschiv, Pirvu, Şişcă, Tiţă, Iancu, Cojocaru, Ion Ion, Manea, Ad. Dumitru, Petruţ, Ispas, C.Dumitriu, Avram, Damaschin, Marta, Lazăr, Koti, Săftoiu, A.Mincu and Petre Petre.

== A glorious period ==
Returned to the first league after a pretty long period, Rapid felt the first tier shock occupying more than disappointing positions: 1984–85 – 11th, 1985–86 – 8th, 1986–87 – 14th, 1987–88 – 13th and 1988–89 – 17th, relegating again to Divizia B, for the fifth time. In these five seasons "the Railwaymen" recorded two other counter-performances, biggest defeat in the history of the club, 0–9 against Corvinul Hunedoara (14 August 1985) and the match with the most goals conceded on the Giulești Stadium, 2–8 against Steaua București (3 May 1989). These poor performances have been improved in the 1988–89 Cupa României season, when "the White and Burgundies" were eliminated only in the semi-finals of the competition by Steaua București, 2–3 with a decisive goal scored in the last minute.

Giuleștenii made a good season and promoted without major problems from the 2nd series of the second league, finishing 1st with 22 victories, 5 draws, 7 defeats, 61 goals scored and 32 conceded, 49 points, 4 more than the second place (Drobeta-Turnu Severin) and 11 more than the third place (Unirea Alba Iulia).

Promoted back in the top flight Rapid had a balanced path and finished 11th, 4 points away from the relegation zone. Followed another two seasons of progress in which "the Railwaymen" finished 7th, then 4th. In 1993 the club was bought by George Copos and began probably one of the most fruitful times in the history of "the White and Burgundies".

After the 4th place occupied at the end of the last season, Rapid returned in the European Cups after 18 years of absence, but was eliminated from the first round of the 1993–94 UEFA Cup by the Italian side Inter Milan, 1–5 on aggregate. In the Divizia A, the club finished 4th again, but no one risked a prognosis for the team that previously had oscillating developments. 1994–95 UEFA Cup season bring again two tough opponents for the Giulești side, Charleroi of Belgium which they eliminated 3–2 on aggregate and Eintracht Frankfurt, which eliminated Rapid after a 6–2 on aggregate, especially due to the 0–5 defeat registered on Waldstadion. In the Divizia A, they finished again on the 4th place, but this time with no qualification for the European Competitions.

Rapid's 1998–99 squad.

In the 1995–96 season the team raised the stakes and finished 3rd, qualifying again in the UEFA Cup. After a 2–-0 victory on aggregate against Lokomotiv Sofia, "the Railwaymen" were eliminated by Karlsruher SC, 2–4 on aggregate, second time when a German side sent home the team from Giulești. The squad had a fall in the first league and finished only 8th at the end of the 1996–97 season.

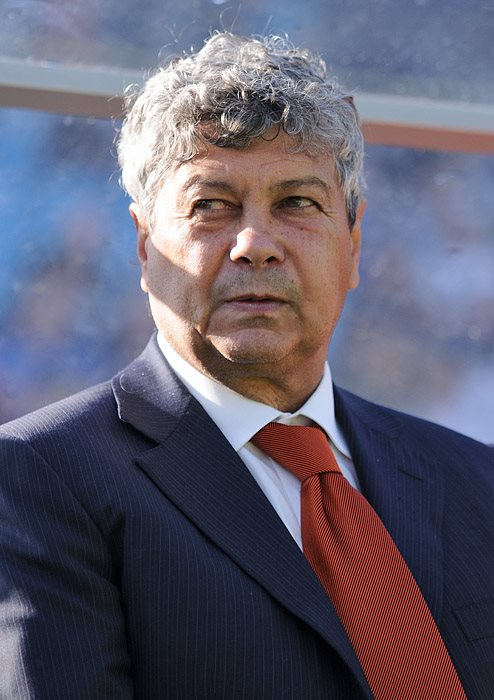
Mircea Lucescu (pictured) and his son, Răzvan, had several spells as Rapid managers between 1997 and 2012. They won three, respectively two domestic trophies with the club.

With Mircea Lucescu as the new coach, Rapid made a very good 1997–98 season, the best one in the last 22 seasons for "the White and Burgundies". In the championship the team finished 2nd, only two points behind Steaua București, missing the chance of a historical title, the first one since 1967. In the last match of the season, with over 20.000 fans travelling from Bucharest, Rapid only managed a 2–2 draw against Universitatea Craiova, a result which was heavily contested after Rapid had a clear goal denied by the referee. Without title, Rapid focused on the Romanian Cup where they won their 10th title, but the first one since 1975. In the final they again met Craiova, with Lucian Marinescu's 67th-minute goal securing the trophy. This triumph has returned the team back to the UEFA Competitions, this time 1998–99 UEFA Cup Winners' Cup. The 1998–99 season started pretty bad for the "Burgundies". After an 8–2 on aggregate against Grevenmacher in the qualifying round, Rapid was again eliminated pretty fast, this time in the first round by Vålerenga, with a 2–2 on aggregate and 2 goals scored on the Giulești Stadium by the Norwegian club. In the championship, Rapid had one of the best seasons in the history of Divizia A, finishing 1st with 89 points and winning the much-desired title of champion of Romania, the 2nd one in the history of the club. This great performance was obtained with coaches: Mircea Lucescu (24 rounds), Nicolae Manea (5 rounds), Dumitru Dumitriu (4 rounds) and Mircea Rednic (1 round) and the following players: Marius Bratu, Bogdan Lobonţ – Daniel Chiriţă, Adrian Iencsi, Dorel Mutică, Ștefan Nanu, Vasile Popa, Răzvan Raţ, Mircea Rednic, Nicolae Stanciu (C), Ion Voicu – Bogdan Andone, Constantin Barbu, Mugur Bolohan, Zeno Bundea, Dănuț Lupu, Ovidiu Maier, Marius Măldărăşanu, Ioan Sabău, Cezar Zamfir – Ionel Ganea, Radu Niculescu, Daniel Pancu, Sergiu Radu and Marius Şumudică. The team also included Cristian Dulca, Lucian Marinescu and Stefan Nanu, who left during the winter break.

1999–2000 season was again a very good one for Rapid, but despite the fact that they had a solid 2nd place, with 15-point over 3rd place (Steaua București), could not oppose to a nearly perfect season made by Dinamo București, which ended on the 1st place, at a distance of 12 points. They also could not defend their Cup, being eliminated in the semi-finals by FC U Craiova, 2–3 on aggregate. In the UEFA Champions League was a great disappointment, the team being eliminated by the Latvian side Skonto, 5–4 on aggregate.

2000–01 season was started with Anghel Iordănescu as the new coach and finished with Mircea Rednic at the helm. Another short European participation, 3–1 against Mika of Armenia in the qualifying round and a 0–1 defeat against Liverpool in the first round was completed with an only 4th place in the championship and a quarter-finals elimination in the Romanian Cup, after a 1–2 against Dinamo. Next season with Viorel Hizo as the new coach, Rapid made another good run and finished 3rd in the league, an already classic two rounds spell in the 2001–02 UEFA Cup, after a furious 12–0 on aggregate against Atlantas, followed an unexpected 0–0 on Parc des Princes against PSG, but in the second leg Rapid lost 0–1, goal Aloísio in the 93rd minute. Finally, the match was awarded 0–3 after the floodlight system shut down. On the other hand, "the Railwaymen" won their 11th Romanian Cup, after a final in which they registered a 2–1 victory against Dinamo București, goals scored by Marius Măldărășanu and Daniel Pancu, also with Mircea Rednic as the new coach.

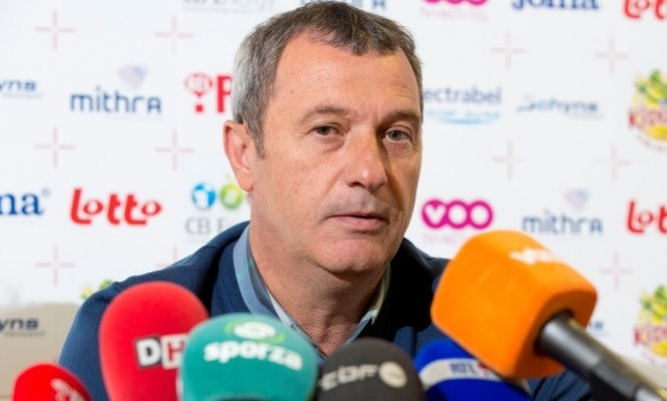
Mircea Rednic, the coach that won the title with Rapid in 2003, also a former player of the team.

The great run shown in the last seasons has materialized in a new title, the third one in the history of the club under the Grant Bridge, title obtained at the end of the 2002–03 season. Rapid finished 1st with an advance of 7 points over Steaua București, made also the classic two rounds spell in the UEFA Cup, 5–1 against Gorica and 1–2 against Vitesse and was eliminated at the penalties by FC Argeș, in the second round proper of the Romanian Cup. The squad that won 3rd title was coached by Mircea Rednic and was composed of the following players: Ionuț Curcă, Emilian Dolha, Răzvan Lucescu, Boban Savič – Nicolae Constantin, Adrian Iencsi, Vasile Maftei, Dănuţ Perjă, Răzvan Raţ, Florin Șoavă, Ion Voicu – Valentin Bădoi, Roberto Bisconti, Emmanuel Godfroid, Nicolae Grigore, Róbert Ilyés, Ioan Sabău – Florin Bratu, Daniel Niculae and Robert Niţă.

Rapid's 2002–03 squad.

After the 3rd title, followed a season below expectations, started with Mircea Rednic, continued with Dan Petrescu and ended with Viorel Hizo, Rapid finished only 3rd, 15 points away from the 1st place, occupied by Dinamo București. In UEFA Champions League Rapidiștii met Anderlecht, and after a 0–0 on the Valentin Stănescu Stadium followed a 2–3 defeat on the Constant Vanden Stock Stadium, after Rapid led 2–0, and was eliminated again in the first rounds of the competition. 2004–05 season was started with a new coach, Răzvan Lucescu and "the White and Burgundies" finished again on the 3rd place, at five and six points from 2nd and 1st places, occupied by Dinamo București, respectively Steaua București. In the Romanian Cup they were eliminated in the first round proper by the Divizia B side Dacia Unirea Brăila, 0–1.

The 3rd place obtained in the league, qualified the club for the 2005–06 UEFA Cup season. Rapid made the best European season in the history of the club, starting from the first round of the competition, qualifying for the first time in the group stage and being eliminated only in the quarter-finals. The team's run was the following: 10–0 on aggregate against Sant Julià from Andorra, 4–1 against Vardar and an unexpected 2–1 on aggregate against Feyenoord, meaning the qualification in the group stage. They were assigned to the Group G, where they obtained 3 victories: Rennes (2–0), Shakhtar Donetsk (1–0), PAOK (1–0) and lost only one match against Stuttgart (1–2). If in the past Rapid was eliminated by German clubs such as Karlsruher SC or Eintracht Frankfurt, now the team transformed in a real "killer" for the German sides after a 3–0 against Hertha in the Round of 32 and a 3–3 with an away goal scored against Hamburg. "The Burgundy Eagles" were stopped only in the quarters by another Romanian side, Steaua București, 1–1 on aggregate, with a goal scored by Steaua in Giulești. This season remained in the history of Rapid, Steaua and Romanian football as one of the most memorable. Rapid also lost the Romanian title in front of Steaua, but won the Romanian Cup, after a 1–0 victory over Dinamo București. The squad used in the 2005–06 European campaign was coached by Răzvan Lucescu and had the following players included: Dănuţ Coman, Ionuț Curcă, Apoula Edel, Mihai Mincă – Marius Constantin, Nicolae Constantin, Vasile Maftei, Dănuţ Perjă, Marius Postolache, Ionuţ Rada, Adrian Rusu, Ionuț Stancu – Valentin Bădoi, Emil Dică, Gigel Ene, Nicolae Grigore, Artavazd Karamyan, Marius Măldărăşanu, Valentin Negru, Romeo Stancu – Mugurel Buga, Lucian Burdujan, Viorel Moldovan, Daniel Niculae, Daniel Pancu and Ciprian Vasilache.

In the following two seasons, Rapid ended on the 4th (2006–07) and 3rd (2007–08) places, with another Romanian Cup title in 2007, in a final won 2–0 against Politehnica Timișoara right on the Dan Păltinișanu Stadium. In the UEFA Cup were constant participations, with another group stage presence in the 2006–07 season, but finished 4th, in a group with PSG, Mladá Boleslav, Hapoel Tel Aviv and Panathinaikos, missing the qualification, followed by a first round elimination in the next season, in front of FC Nürnberg.

== Rapid "in derailment" ==
Chart showing the progress of Rapid's league finishes from 1932 until present.

After the 2007–08 season, the financial situation of Rapid was complicated, partly by the criminal condemnation of the owner, George Copos, in two files: "Transfers" and "Lottery". The performances also went into decline after finished 3rd in 2007–08, Rapid occupied middle table places three times over the next five years: 2008–09 – 8th, 2009–10 – 7th and 2012–13 – 9th. Still, the team had a last outburst of pride in the 2010–11 and 2011–12 seasons, when under coaches Marius Șumudică, Marian Rada and then Răzvan Lucescu they achieved two consecutive rankings on the 4th place and implicitly having two new presence in the UEFA Europa League. 2011–12 UEFA Europa League season was finished in the group stage for "the White and Burgundies", after they eliminated Polish side Śląsk Wrocław in the play-off round, made only 3 points in a group with Hapoel Tel Aviv, PSV Eindhoven and Legia Warsaw, occupying the last place. Next season was slightly weaker, Rapid stopping in the third qualifying round, after a two-legged match against Heerenveen, previously eliminating 5–1 on aggregate, Finnish club MYPA.

On 10 May 2013, the Disciplinary Commission of the Romanian Football Federation decided not to grant the Liga I license to the club for the 2013–14 season. At the end of the season the club was sold by George Copos to Nicolae Cristescu and Adrian Zamfir.

On 6 July the FRF Executive Committee decided that 18 teams would participate in the first league. Mircea Sandu announced that a play-off between Concordia Chiajna (which relegated on the pitch) and Rapid (which relegated on legal terms) will be held to decide the 18th team. This match took place on 13 July 2013 on the Dinamo Stadium and was won by "the Railwaymen" with 2–1. Concordia challenged the legality of this play-off match, as Rapid had no license for Liga I. After two rounds that had already been played, on 2 August 2013, the Court of Arbitration for Sport (CAS) decided that the organization of the play-off match was irregular and Concordia must remain in the top flight, Rapid being relegated.

Relegated for the sixth time in the second league, and after a period of 23 years spent in the top flight with excellent performances, Rapid has gathered all its forces, despite a poor financial situation and an under-funding from the new owners. Under coach Viorel Moldovan, former player of the team, "the Burgundy Eagles" made a good season, finishing 2nd the regular stage and the play-off round of the 2013–14 season, right behind Politehnica Iași and two points over Unirea Slobozia, ensuring their promotion in the first league. On 17 May 2014, the Licensing Commission of the Romanian Football Federation decided not to grant, again, the license, this time for the 2014–15 season of Liga I. Rapid decided to appeal to the Court of Arbitration for Sport, but could not afford 30,000€, trial fee; this was gathered through a donation of the club supporters, and CAS admitted the appeal, forcing the Romanian Football Federation to give Rapid a license for the Liga I season.

In the meantime the club was bought by Valerii Moraru, a Moldovan businessman, but under coaches Ionel Ganea, Marian Rada, Cristian Pustai and Cristiano Bergodi, the team made a very weak season, finishing only 16th, out of 18, and relegated back to the Liga II, for the seventh time.

Back in Liga II, with Dan Alexa as a coach, this time, Rapid made a solid season, despite the fact that historical debts suffocated the club and the under-funding of the new owner does not help too much, either. At the end of the 2015–16 season, Rapid promoted from the 1st place, with three points over its main follower, Dunărea Călărași. The club did not recover financially, the team of seniors remained with only a few players and no coaches. After a first instance bankruptcy of the club decision, FC Rapid could not register any new contracts, so it could not be built a team to join the 2016–17 season. Finally on 14 December 2016, Rapid was declared officially bankrupt, after a half of season of inactivity.

== Rebirth ==
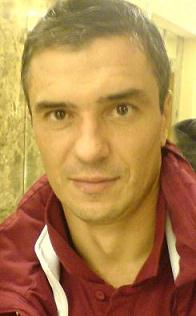
Daniel Pancu, a symbol of modern Rapid and the technical director of the club, after its 2017 refoundation.

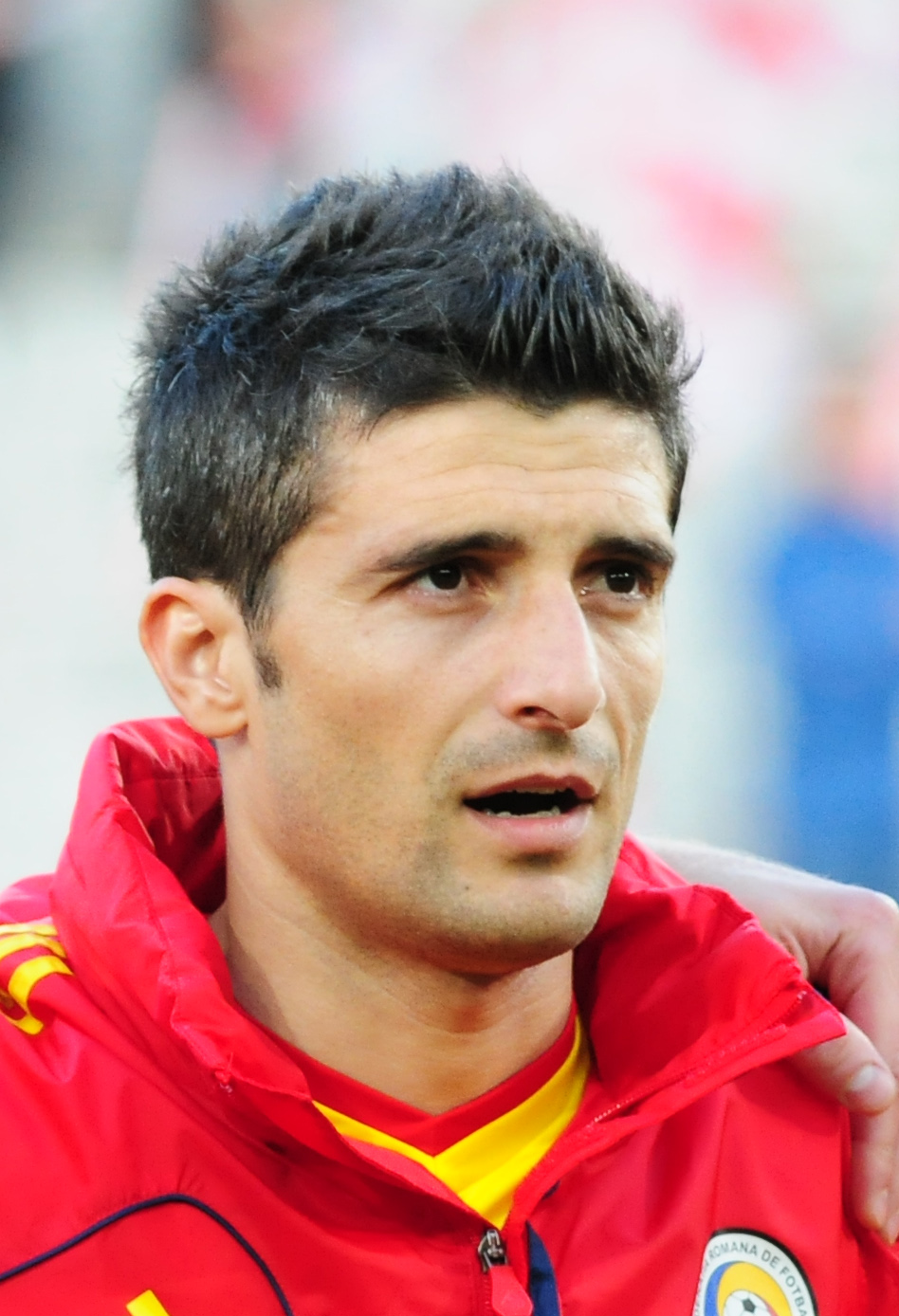
Daniel Niculae, also a symbol and the president of the club, after its refoundation.

In the summer of 2016, after it became clear that the team could no longer be enrolled in the championship, the idea of setting up somewhere in the lower leagues appeared, more exactly, in the Bucharest Championship, the 5th division. A split between the supporters and the people involved in the club's life appeared, resulting in two new clubs, AFC Rapid București and Mişcarea Feroviară CFR, after initially not less than four teams had been announced, but most of the projects did not resist. If AFC Rapid, owned by ex-Rapid marketing director, Horia Manoliu, was in fact an old society of the parent club, used between 2001 and 2006, Mişcarea Feroviară was founded by the members of the Rapid Aristocratic Club. Both teams had an excellent run and promoted in the Liga IV.

The two clubs did not seem to have the force to attack a new promotion, so in the summer of 2017, at the initiative of Sector 1 Municipality, the sports association, Academia Rapid București, was set up and enrolled in the Liga IV – Bucharest series. This club is run by former Rapid players such as: Daniel Niculae (president), Daniel Pancu (technical director), Nicolae Stanciu (manager), and Constantin Schumacher (coach). By the time the auction for the bankrupt company's brand was finalized, Academia Rapid concluded a lease agreement for a period of one year. This team has proven to be very popular among supporters, who consider it the moral successor of the parent club. In the same summer Mişcarea Feroviară disappeared.

Academia Rapid won 2017–18 Liga IV Bucharest after a tough duel with Steaua București. Also, the Romanian Cup trophy for Bucharest preliminary rounds entered in club's treasury and the phoenix club of Rapid qualified for the next season's Liga III after a two-legged promotion play-off match against FC Singureni, Giurgiu County champions, which they won 17–1 on aggregate.

On 12 June 2018, after 18 auctions along which the price of Rapid brand has fallen by about €3 million, Academia Rapid bought the FC Rapid București brand, becoming officially the successor of the original club. The transaction was made for the amount of €406,800, thus giving legitimacy to the new entity, even though it had already been accepted by most supporters and ex-legends of the club as the successor of the original club, a fact confirmed in the championship match against Steaua București on 14 April, when on the Arena Națională 37.000 fans attended the match.

The start of the 2018–19 season came with a lot of difficulties for Rapid. Despite being 1st on the table, the football produced by the team suffered, and as a result, coach Constantin Schumacher was replaced with former player Daniel Pancu, which also led to the departures of Daniel Niculae and Vasile Maftei. On 24 November, Rapid played its last game on Giulesti, which was going to be demolished later that year to make space for a new Category 4 Stadium. They will play their future matches on Regie until the completion of the new one. On 12 May, Rapid mathematically obtained the promotion to Liga II with a 3–0 win against the main contender, Unirea Slobozia. They finished the season first with 75 points, 11 ahead of the second place.

The new 2019–20 season saw Rapid in the Romanian second Division, with Daniel Pancu on the bench as the head coach of the team. Great victories against 1st and 2nd ranked teams, UTA Arad (2–0) and CS Mioveni (5–1), gave the whole team hope for promotion, and Rapid found themselves in 3rd place after the first half of the season. The winter break came, and after a poor start to the second-half of the season, Daniel Pancu was sacked from the club. Dan Alexa was appointed as the new head coach of the team. Exactly as Daniel Pancu, Dan Alexa didn't really succeed in giving the club a boost so he was sacked from the club in a few months time. After Dan Alexa, Adrian Iencsi was hired as head coach, he also didn't perform and as the club had no more ideas of whom to bring on the team, they let Mihai Iosif, the assistant coach of the club become the new head coach. Mihai Iosif did what none of his predecessors could do, and brought Rapid to the first Romanian League (Liga I). Rapid began the 2021–22 season in the Liga I very well, with 5 consecutive wins and no goals conceded in 7 matches, which is a record in Romania.

== Shirt sponsors and manufacturers ==
Period	Kit manufacturer	Shirt sponsor
1923–1984	Unknown	None
1984–1994	(Italy) Ennerre	None
1993–1994	(Italy) Lotto	(South Korea) Samsung
1994–1996	(Germany) Uhlsport	(South Korea) Samsung
1996–1997	(Germany) Adidas	(South Korea) Samsung
1997–1998	Overline	(England) Connex
1998–2000	(Italy) Kappa	(England) Connex
2000–2003	(Italy) Errea	(Romania) LaDorna
2003–2004	(Italy) Garman	(Romania) LaDorna
2004–2006	(Italy) Lotto	(Russia) Lukoil
2006–2007	(Italy) Lotto	(Romania) Altex
2007–2008	(Italy) Lotto	Holstein
2008–2009	(Italy) Lotto	(England) Vodafone
2009–2010	(Italy) Lotto	(England) Unibet
2010–2011	(Germany) Puma	(Romania) Superbet
2011–2012	(Germany) Puma	(England) Vodafone
2012–2013	(Germany) Puma	None
2013–2014	(Germany) Puma	(Romania) Domeniile Samburesti
2014–2016	(Germany) Puma	(Romania) Azuga Apa de Izvor
2016–2017	None	None
2017–2018	(Romania) Fourteen	(Romania) Superbet
2019–2021	(Italy) Macron	(Romania) Superbet
2021–2023	(United States) Nike	(Romania) Superbet
2021–2023	(United States) Nike	(Romania) Mobexpert
2023-	(Italy) Kappa	(Romania) Mobexpert
