= 1940 Cupa României final =

- Event: 1939–40 Cupa României
Rapid București	Venus București
2	1
- Date: 8 November 1940
- Venue: ONEF, Bucharest
- Referee: Mihail Petrescu (Bucharest)
- Attendance: 12,000

The 1940 Cupa României final was the seventh final of Romania's most prestigious football cup competition. It was disputed between Venus București and Rapid București, and was won by Rapid București after 4 games. This final is unique in the history because the winner decided after 4 games, 3 games ended draw after extra-time and just after the third reply Rapid București won with 2–1.

== Match details ==
30 April 1940
17:45 EET

Rapid București	2–2 (a.e.t.)	Venus București
Baratky 22'; Sipos 33'	Report	Iordache 42'; Ploeşteanu 86'

ONEF, Bucharest
Attendance: 20,000
Referee: Emil Kroner (Bucharest)

GK	1	(Romania) Petre Rădulescu
DF	2	(Romania) Zoltan Marton
DF	3	(Romania) Iosif Lengheriu
MF	4	(Romania) Vintilă Cossini
MF	5	(Romania) Gheorghe Rășinaru
MF	6	(Romania) Ioachim Moldoveanu
FW	7	(Hungary) Vilmos Sipos
FW	8	(Romania) Florian Radu
FW	9	(Romania) Iuliu Baratky
FW	10	(Romania) Ştefan Auer
FW	11	(Romania) Ion Bogdan
Manager:
(Romania) Ştefan Auer

GK	1	(Romania) Mircea David
DF	2	(Romania) Lazăr Sfera
DF	3	(Romania) Alexandru Negrescu
MF	4	(Romania) Rudolf Demetrovici
MF	5	(Romania) Gusztáv Juhász
MF	6	(Romania) Ioan Lupaș
FW	7	(Romania) Cornel Orza
FW	8	(Romania) Silviu Ploeşteanu
FW	9	(Romania) Traian Iordache
FW	10	(Romania) Iuliu Bodola
FW	11	(Romania) Nicolae Ene
Manager:
(Hungary) Béla Jánosy

== Replay ==
9 June 1940
17:45 EET

Rapid București	4–4 (a.e.t.)	Venus București
Gavrilescu 8'; Baratky 10'; Sipos 61'; Auer 79'	Report	Humis 5', 18'; Orza 16'; Bodola 52'

ONEF, Bucharest
Attendance: 14,000
Referee: Emil Kroner (Bucharest)

GK	1	(Romania) Ioan Negru
DF	2	(Romania) Zoltan Marton
DF	3	(Romania) Iosif Lengheriu
MF	4	(Romania) Vintilă Cossini
MF	5	(Romania) Gheorghe Rășinaru
MF	6	(Romania) Ioachim Moldoveanu
FW	7	(Hungary) Vilmos Sipos
FW	8	(Romania) Dan Gavrilescu
FW	9	(Romania) Iuliu Baratky
FW	10	(Romania) Ştefan Auer
FW	11	(Romania) Ion Bogdan
Manager:
(Romania) Ştefan Auer

GK	1	(Romania) Mircea David
DF	2	(Romania) Lazăr Sfera
DF	3	(Romania) Alexandru Negrescu
MF	4	(Romania) Rudolf Demetrovici
MF	5	(Romania) Gusztáv Juhász
MF	6	(Romania) Ioan Lupaș
FW	7	(Romania) Cornel Orza
FW	8	(Romania) Silviu Ploeşteanu
FW	9	(Romania) Traian Iordache
FW	10	(Romania) Iuliu Bodola
FW	11	(Romania) Kostas Humis
Manager:
(Hungary) Béla Jánosy

== Second replay ==
27 October 1940
17:45 EET

Rapid București	2–2 (a.e.t.)	Venus București
Baratky 59', 93'	Report	Iordache 85'; Eisenbeisser 103'

Giulești, Bucharest
Attendance: 12,000
Referee: Tică Iliescu (Bucharest)

GK	1	(Romania) Ioan Negru
DF	2	(Romania) Iosif Slivăț
DF	3	(Romania) Iosif Lengheriu
MF	4	(Romania) Vintilă Cossini
MF	5	(Romania) Gheorghe Rășinaru
MF	6	(Romania) Ioachim Moldoveanu
FW	7	(Hungary) Vilmos Sipos
FW	8	(Romania) Dan Gavrilescu
FW	9	(Romania) Iuliu Baratky
FW	10	(Romania) Ştefan Auer
FW	11	(Romania) Ion Bogdan
Manager:
(Romania) Ştefan Auer

GK	1	(Romania) Mircea David
DF	2	(Romania) Bondoc Ionescu-Crum
DF	3	(Romania) Gheorghe Brandabura
MF	4	(Romania) Alexandru Negrescu
MF	5	(Romania) Alfred Eisenbeisser
MF	6	(Romania) Ioan Lupaș
FW	7	(Romania) Nicolae Ene
FW	8	(Romania) Silviu Ploeşteanu
FW	9	(Romania) Traian Iordache
FW	10	(Romania) Petea Vâlcov
FW	11	(Romania) Kostas Humis
Manager:
(Hungary) Béla Jánosy

== Third replay ==
8 November 1940
14:30 EET

Rapid București	2–1	Venus București
Baratky 57'; Gavrilescu 74'	Report	Eisenbeisser 86'

ONEF, Bucharest
Attendance: 12,000
Referee: Mihail Petrescu (Bucharest)

GK	1	(Romania) Robert Sadowski
DF	2	(Romania) Iosif Slivăț
DF	3	(Romania) Iosif Lengheriu
MF	4	(Romania) Vintilă Cossini
MF	5	(Romania) Gheorghe Rășinaru
MF	6	(Romania) Ioachim Moldoveanu
FW	7	(Hungary) Vilmos Sipos
FW	8	(Romania) Dan Gavrilescu
FW	9	(Romania) Iuliu Baratky
FW	10	(Romania) Ion Jurcă
FW	11	(Romania) Ion Bogdan
Manager:
(Romania) Ştefan Auer

GK	1	(Romania) Mircea David
DF	2	(Romania) Lazăr Sfera
DF	3	(Romania) Gheorghe Brandabura
MF	4	(Romania) Alexandru Negrescu
MF	5	(Romania) Alfred Eisenbeisser
MF	6	(Romania) Ioan Lupaș
FW	7	(Romania) Nicolae Ene
FW	8	(Romania) Silviu Ploeşteanu
FW	9	(Romania) Traian Iordache
FW	10	(Romania) Petea Vâlcov
FW	11	(Romania) Kostas Humis
Manager:
(Hungary) Béla Jánosy

== See also ==
- List of Cupa României finals
