= Lazăr Sfera =

Romanian footballer, coach, and referee (1909–1992)

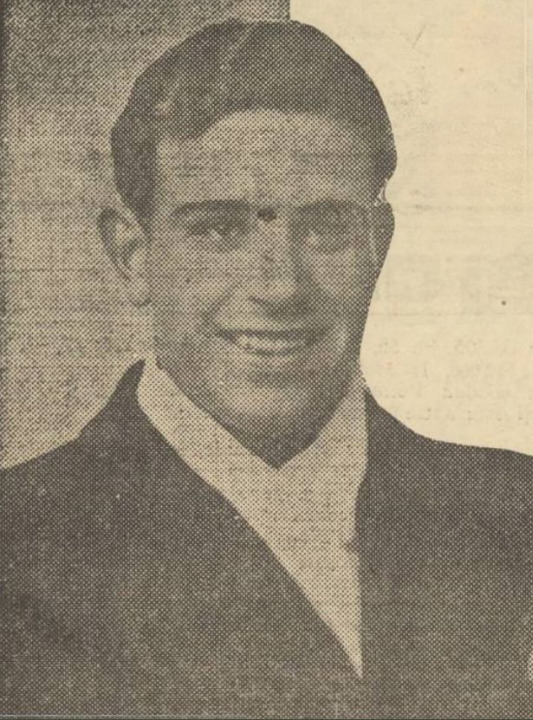
- Sfera, c. 1939

Personal information
- Date of birth: 29 April 1909
- Place of birth: Végszentmihály, Austria-Hungary
- Date of death: 24 April 1992 (aged 83)
- Place of death: Bucharest, Romania
- Positions: Defender; midfielder

Youth career
- 1923: Unirea CFR Timișoara
- 1923–1925: Politehnica Timișoara

Senior career*
Years	Team	Apps	(Gls)
1927–1929	Politehnica Timișoara		
1929	Banatul Timișoara		
1929–1930	România Cluj		
1930–1934	Universitatea Cluj	27	(2)
1934–1941	Venus București	132	(3)
1945	Vulturul de Mare București		

International career
1931–1941	Romania	14	(0)

Managerial career
- 1941: Venus București
- 1945: Vulturul de Mare București
- 1946: FC Carmen București
- 1946: Viforul Dacia București
- 1948: Tăbăcăria Națională
- c. 1955–1956: Metalul București
- 1958: Uzina de Autobuze
- c. 1958: Cetatea Bucur
- c. 1971–1972: Vîscoza București
- * Club domestic league appearances and goals

Lazăr Sfera (29 April 1909 – 24 April 1992) was a Romanian footballer who played as a defender and occasionally as a midfielder. A native of the Banat region in Austria-Hungary, he was briefly included in the Romanian Yugoslav community. In the 1920s, he moved with his family to Timișoara, which had been secured for the Romanian Kingdom. It was here that he began playing a variety of sports, including street football. The boy was discovered by the scouts of Unirea CFR, which became his first club. In 1925, Sfera joined Politehnica Timișoara's first-ever youth squad. Two years later, he was promoted to the main team, where he came to be mentored by Tony Cargnelli.

Sfera impressed the Timișoara fans with his performances in local derbies, and had a stint at Banatul. However, he decided to focus mainly on his education: moving to Cluj for a chance to attend its business school, he played for România Cluj (1929–1931) and Universitatea (1931–1934). Upon graduation, Sfera took the option of relocating to Bucharest, signing up with Venus București (and marrying his boss' daughter); in subsequent matches against Universitatea, he was sent off for participating in violence against his former teammates. He also became entangled in political controversies, being upheld as an ally by the far-right of Romanian nationalism at a time when many Divizia A players belonged to ethnic minorities.

Sfera and Gheorghe Albu together formed the core of Venus' defense, helping the team win three successive editions of Divizia A. Sfera was less active with the Romanian national squad, appearing as a substitute in the 1934 FIFA World Cup (and missing out on the 1938 edition). He withdrew from football during the 1940–1941 season, after his young daughter had died. Sfera's planned return as Venus' player-coach was cancelled, since the entire championship was suspended during World War II. He briefly managed FC Carmen București before the imposition of a communist regime; later, he was mainly a referee in the lesser leagues, only occasionally resuming coaching for workers' clubs—he worked as an accountant in state companies, and as such handled their respective teams (Uzina de Autobuze and Cetatea Bucur). He died shortly after the Romanian Revolution of 1989; in his final years, he was receiving stipends from the Romanian Football Federation, which had recognized him as an expert adviser.

== Playing career ==
=== Debut ===
Sfera was born on 29 April 1909 as a subject of Austria-Hungary in Végszentmihály (today Lokve, administered as part of Alibunar in Serbia; known in Romanian as Sân-Mihai). He belonged to the ethnic Romanian community in the historical Banat region. Following World War I and the fall of the dual monarchy, and just as Lazăr had completed grade four at a local school, his family opted to relocate into the Romanian Kingdom. In doing so, the Sferas chose not to become subjects of Yugoslavia, and were instead naturalized Romanian. Later in life, Lazăr joined an "Association of Refugees from the Yugoslav Banat". Upon arrival to Romania, his father joined the state railway carrier (CFR) as a skilled worker, while his mother was employed at a cigarette factory in Timișoara. Lazăr lived with them, as well as with his sister and grandfather, in Mehala district, where they built themselves a house (at No 13 Zorile Street). In a 1966 interview, he described himself as a Timișoara native. Elsewhere, he also confessed to being fluent in Serbian. This skill allowed him to communicate directly with Yugoslav players on opposing teams.

It was in Mehala that Sfera was first introduced to street football, using either a rag ball or a regulation tennis ball. Affiliated with an informal club representing his street, he was a goalkeeper, then a half-back, before he found that he was most at ease as a defender. At age twelve or thirteen, Sfera was discovered by a local coach, Cristian Petcu, who had him join the youth squad of Unirea CFR Timișoara. Here, he was colleagues with Vasile Deheleanu, Ioan Doboșan and Grațian Sepi, who were also his schoolmates; their on-pitch collaboration was noted by Silviu Sepi of Politehnica Timișoara, who recruited them for his own team—thus creating Politehnica's first-ever youth squad. Sfera, as the bulkier boy, was assigned to play right-back. He also delved in other sports, such as boxing and wrestling, and ran every day to his high school, which, he recalled, was "quite far away" from Mehala.

By his own account, Sfera struggled in school, managing not to be held back. He reports that his German-language teacher was a personal enemy of his and Sepi, since he supported Club Atletic (CAT), calling both boys to the board on Mondays and Saturdays, when they had no chance of being prepared. Despite such pressures, Sfera stayed with Politehnica's youth roaster from 1923 to 1925. He and other teenagers were promoted to the regular club following sweeping changes caused by the sudden death of Politehnica's leading defender, Coriolan Neamțu.

Sfera's first official match under Politehnica's colors was with local favorites Chinezul; as he later remembered, Politehnica only lost 2–1. He went on playing for Politehnica's main squad for some four years. The period left a mark on his entire career, due to being coached by Tony Cargnelli—who imposed strict discipline through grueling fitness training. On 15 November 1926, a Politehnica squad coached by Cargnelli, with Sfera and Deheleanu as star players, defeated favorites Banatul Timișoara 4–1, knocking them out of the Timiș-Torontal County games. On 27 March 1927, Politehnica played in front of a record-breaking 700 spectators, defeating the wealthier CAT (which unusually also had Cargnelli on its staff). The final score was 3–0, with Sfera scoring one of the goals.

On 16 December, the club missed out on qualifying for Divizia A, which was the top tier of Romania's football pyramid. It drew 2–2 with Chinezul, who took the regional spot for the 1927–1928 season. A match analysis by writer Ion Iliescu-Zănoagă suggested that Sfera was partly to blame for this result, but no more than the goalkeeper, Pitea. In April 1928, Politehnica went to Bucharest, the Romanian capital, for a chance to play against FC Juventus. The match stunned the sports columnist at Universul daily, since Politehnica, at the time ranked third in its region, proved to be an "awful disappointment"—and Sfera its "mediocre defender". His form had improved by April 1929, when he was called up for the all-Timișoara squad, assembled by Géza Drexler for a tournament in Bucharest. Late that month, Politehnica drew with Kadima in what the local press viewed as "an extremely exciting match". In that context, Sfera was forming an "excellent backcourt pair" with teammate Ignuța.

=== In Cluj ===
Later in 1929, Sfera was briefly employed by his former rivals at Banatul. The same year, he left for Cluj, enlisting at the Commercial Academy (AISCI); on 6 October, he debuted for a local club, FC România. As he recalled in an interview that criticized the full professionalization of football, he himself had not wanted to move from Timișoara, but did so because of his need for a prestigious diploma. In tandem, he continued to attend meetings of the Banatian refugees, being elected an auditor of their pressure-group in June 1930. During his first league season in Cluj, he participated in the running conflict between România and Universitatea. In the local derby of 28 April 1930, he injured opposing striker Anton Huniade, sparking indignation. Upon the end of the game, Sfera was punched by Universitatea supporter Virgil Mircea, and punched back; the unconscious Mircea was trampled upon by the crowd, and had to be hospitalized.

Ahead of the 1930–1931 season, Dacia (Babeș-Bolyai) University's rector, Iuliu Hațieganu, instituted a policy that prevented Cluj students from signing up with outside clubs. As a result, Sfera and Deheleanu were inducted by Universitatea, which represented Dacia; according to Sfera, his and others accepted the transfer as a way of keeping Universitatea active, as it would have otherwise been disbanded. He then helped consolidate his new club's prestige within Divizia A. On 22 March 1931, he was included on a representative team of Romania's universities. At Bucharest's Romcomit, they met and defeated (5–3) a similar team, fielded by Czechoslovakia. During April, his club was invited to play a tournament at Cernăuți, by local sides Dragoș Vodă and Maccabi. In justifying their selection, the Cernăuți officials proposed that Universitatea was "arguably the strongest team in Romania", and that nine of its players, including Sfera, were among the country's finest.

In June 1931, Sfera was included on a Bucharest representative team that traveled to Zagreb, and played that city's squad, losing 6–2. This event also witnessed a clash between Sfera's colleague, Gheorghe Albu, and Yugoslav striker Ico Hitrec; Sfera punched Hitrec to defend Albu, but then deescalated the looming fight, and earned his hosts' respect, calling this one of his most memorable matches. The first of Sfera's fourteen caps for the actual national team came on 26 August 1931: he and his teammates defeated Lithuania at Kaunas Stadium (2–4). Journalist V. Firoiu, who traveled with the Romanian squad on its "Baltic tour" (where Romania scored additional easy victories against Poland and a team representing the Free City of Danzig), declared Sfera "a revelation". Upon his return, Sfera was fielded for a home friendly between Universitatea and Újpest FC, then-winners of the Hungarian national league. Fought on 30 August, it was his international club debut. As observed by the Bukaresti Lapok following the 5–4 victory, Sfera and G. Sepi were the best players—both at Universitatea and on the national team.

In October 1931, a representative team of the Romanian Northern League met its southern counterpart for an unofficial cup final. Sfera, included in the former, scored the only goal, from a penalty kick. According to Firoiu, the penalty should never have been awarded: its granting signaled an end to the "few moments of actual football" that had occurred in this "improvised march". Universitatea also made a habit of playing against Hungarian teams, and in May 1932 was defeated by Bocskai FC; Sfera scored one goal in that match. Under Universitatea's colors, Sfera once again confronted Újpest, in a 1–1 game. The intensity of this match saw him injured by Albert Ströck; his right leg was fractured, and he could not use it for passes during the next two years, though he hid this handicap from both his fans and his adversaries.

Sfera claimed to have been invited by Hitrec to join his new team, Grasshopper Club Zurich. He had no regrets about refusing, citing language barriers and his focus on completing his education at home. Still at Cluj, he appeared in the inaugural season of Cupa României (1933–1934). On 22 April 1934, Universitatea eliminated Maccabi București (4–0), but Sfera's own apathy was observed and reprehended by Rampa newspaper. In the June semifinals, he scored the winning goal against UDR. His feat was remarkable for being at an away field in Reșița, and during a time when two of his teammates had been injured, with no substitutions available. He was however unavailable for cup final, which saw his team defeated by FC Ripensia Timișoara. Sfera was additionally a member of Romania's 1934 World Cup squad in Italy, but only as a reserve. The team was eliminated from that tournament in the round of 16, after losing 2–1 to Czechoslovakia. The match, which took place at Trieste Stadium on 27 May, did not feature an appearance by Sfera.

=== Bucharest relocation ===
Towards the end of the 1933–1934 league schedule, Sfera was becoming jaded with Universitatea, failing to even show up for the 1 October march with Crișana Oradea. He asked to play against FC Venus, but was only allowed after presenting his excuses to Hațieganu. After graduating from the AISCI, Sfera began his mandatory service in the Romanian Land Forces, during which time he began receiving offers from various clubs. Eventually, he moved to Bucharest, and signed with Venus. He was offered 150 thousand lei as a lump payment for his transfer, but refused to accept the gift, insisting that he wanted a regular job, and sending most of his salary to his father in Timișoara. He was first announced as a Venus player in early July 1934, scheduled to appear in an international friendly against FK Austria Wien. He continued on at Universitatea until 17 July, when the terms of his transfer were to the satisfaction of both teams. In August, he was called up for a tournament between the army squads of the Little Entente, when it was revealed that he was still a short-term conscript in the Land Forces, with the rank of Corporal.

Sfera's early appearances at Venus included a Czechoslovak tour in September 1934. It culminated in what Curentul daily reported as a "catastrophic loss" (9–2) against SK Slavia Prague, during which he was one of the three injured Venusians. He was committed to his new club and, during December 1934, was punished with a 15-day suspension for having hit one of the Universitatea players during a direct encounter (the period was halved on appeal). Bucharest became his permanent home: by February 1936, he was a clerk at the Transylvanian Mining Consortium; at the time, he was living on Șoseaua Kiseleff, in a villa owned by Venus' director, Alexandru Eladescu. In November, with a civil ceremony at the Green-Sector town hall, he married Irina Eladescu, who was his boss' daughter. Sfera was initially integrated on the four-man defense, alongside Albu, Andrei Bărbulescu and Costel Constantinescu. By 25 March 1935, when Venus was facing România Cluj in a friendly, the defensive line had been split into three half-backs and Sfera as a sweeper. The club had a narrow win, credited by a Curentul reporter to Sfera's tackles, which outweighed his teammates' poor physical condition. The same author speculated that Sfera might have wished to humiliate his former team, accounting for his visible "toughness".

Following changes of strategy, Sfera formed a defensive duo with Albu. They were initially seen as weak: in August 1935, when Venus hosted Austria Wien for another friendly, Vestul newspaper rated both men as "awful". They rebounded and, during their three-season collaboration in Divizia A, Venus conceded less than one goal per match. In later years, Sfera called Albu his best teammate, as well as the "perfect sportsman" and entirely without vices. Sfera himself organized parties as a youth, but later stopped drinking altogether, though he regularly smoked tobacco. He and Albu were similarly paired at the national squad, which Sfera captained on six different occasions. To his stated regret, he was fielded much less often than Albu, since Rudolf Bürger was "better than me".

Sfera was also being reprimanded for behavioral issues. One such instance was the Bucharest championship final of 1 September 1935, which Venus won 3–2 against the local Maccabi; Albu was not available for the event, and Sfera was instead paired with Bărbulescu. Facla newspaper rated his contribution as decisive, while criticizing him for his hard tackles. In March 1936, after renewed and intentional altercations with Universitatea's strikers, he received a heavy penalty from the Romanian Football Federation (FRF), with a six-month suspension from the 1936–1937 season; Eladescu was similarly punished as his instigator. Before the end of March, the punishment was reduced by the Federal Bureau, to only two months. He reentered the pitch on 1 May, in a division match against Club Atletic Oradea. In June, when Venus encountered Újpest for a Bucharest friendly, he was seen by Lupta newspaper as player of the match.

In a 1936 interview, Sfera indicated that, even as the prevailing mentality was that footballers were already old at thirty, he had no intention of retiring, and expressed confidence that he was only getting better with age. He also stated that he had no intention of ever playing against Venus. In 1937, the far-right newspapers Buna Vestire and Porunca Vremii alleged that Sfera was being undermined on purpose by Jewish opinion-makers, whom he had come to question. In one such piece, Virgil Popescu, who called Sfera his friend, defined Venus itself as a native team, one marginalized by "a press that resents all things Romanian." Porunca Vremii described Sfera as "a dear" and a "staunch Romanian", suggesting that he was being alienated at the national team—whose star players, in 1937, were members of non-Romanian ethnic groups (such as Iuliu Baratky and Ștefan Dobay). In January 1938, Sfera stated his respect for the Iron Guard's cult heroes, Ion Moța and Vasile Marin, who had died fighting alongside the Spanish Nationalists. In his message to Buna Vestire, he described them as having opened the "shining path" on an entire generation.

=== "The Venusian Rock" ===
Known to fans as Badea Lazăr ("Old Boy Lazăr") and Stânca venusistă ("The Venusian Rock"), Sfera won three titles as Divizia A champion, but never took the national cup (Venus was permanently at odds with Rapid, which knocked it out in the 1939 semi-finals). He was incapacitated by injury during June 1938, causing damage to Venus (who were soundly defeated by HAŠK at an exhibition match); he was also absent from the national squad during its stint at the 1938 World Cup in France. His failure to show up for training created a dispute between the FRF and FIFA, when the latter refused to accept Rudolf Wetzer as a last-minute replacement.

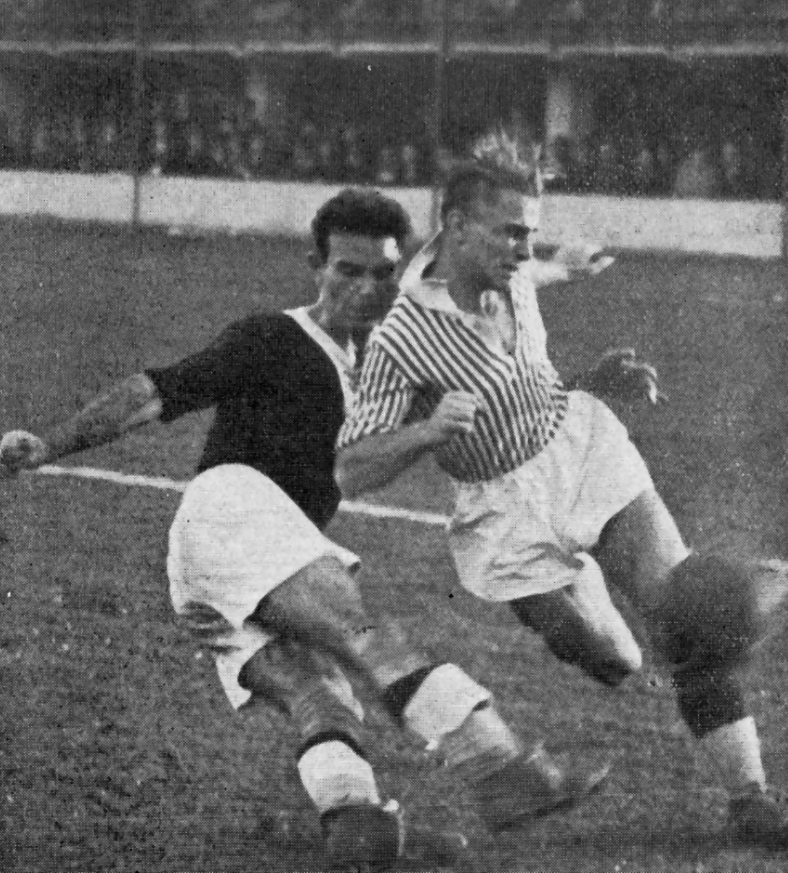
Sfera (left) tackling Vasile Naciu of Juventus in October 1938

Sfera underwent surgery and, after making a full recovery, came back to Divizia A during the season break, in late July 1938. He played only briefly after the subsequent season opening, being seriously injured in November: at a match against FC Carpați București, the striker he was marking kicked him in the face, resulting in permanent scarring and two missing teeth. He was in peak form by May 1939. In a championship match against FC Victoria Cluj (the former România), he scored what was probably the season's longest goal, with a shot from center-line.

Sfera was also part of the squad which faced off against England at ANEF of Bucharest on 24 May 1939. Just ahead of this encounter, Ionel Teodoreanu, the novelist and occasional sports critic, described Sfera as a "veritable tornado", and as one of his team's best assets. Though defeated, Sfera himself took pride in having managed to mark and neutralize Tommy Lawton, seen by him as the most unbeatable striker of his day. He also violently tackled Don Welsh, tearing off Welsh's shorts.

One of Sfera's final caps at the national team came later in 1939, during a heated 1–1 draw with geopolitical rivals Hungary; he was tasked with marking György Sárosi. For the 1939–1940 season, Albu, Sfera and goalkeeper Mircea David made a sustained effort to take the national cup, by creating what was, in their own definition, a "defensive wall". This tactic also required them to conceal that David was nearsighted, and as such that they were vulnerable against long-distance kicks. The three were motivated, knowing that it was their last chance at the cup.

On 23 November 1939, Sfera announced that he would retire from football at the end of the season, with no additional explanation. However, he postponed his decision for another year and a half. On 27 February, Venus defeated the Divizia B side FC Carmen București, 5–2 (with Sfera scoring one of the goals from a penalty kick). However, as pointed out by the sports chronicler at Universul, he and his team had struggled, and only won through their superior fitness. In March, Sfera received the Romanian Kingdom's Meritul Cultural distinction, second class. On the final day of that month, Romania drew 3–3 with Yugoslavia. Sfera was described by Capitala paper as "wonderful in all that he did", including in assisting a comeback goal by Baratky.

=== Final official matches ===
On 28 April 1940, Sfera and his father-in-law celebrated Easter as members of the Romanian Orthodox Church, also rejoicing in the birth of Sfera's daughter some eight days before. On 23 June, Venus were eliminated from the Mitropa Cup by BSK. According to a match report in Ordinea daily, Sfera and Sandu Negrescu, who acted as the new defensive pair at Venus, were exceptional, while most of the team was mediocre. Due to his busy schedule, he could not travel to Frankfurt, where Romania had a friendly against the Greater German squad on 14 July.

The tensions brought on by World War II, which had already ravaged areas neighboring Romania, created issues at Venus during the 1940–1941 edition of Divizia A. As a result of the Second Vienna Award, Romania ceded Northern Transylvania, including Cluj and other centers of interwar football, to Regency Hungary. In the aftermath, Venus' midfielder, Gusztáv Juhász, simply quit his job and crossed into Hungary. The loss, coupled with a similar defection by Iuliu Bodola, angered Romanian commentators. In a Sportul Capitalei editorial, Victor Ardeleanu looked back on the failed attempts at integrating Hungarian Romanians, including on the national team. According to Ardeleanu, nothing could have made such players as patriotic as Sfera or Silviu Ploeșteanu.

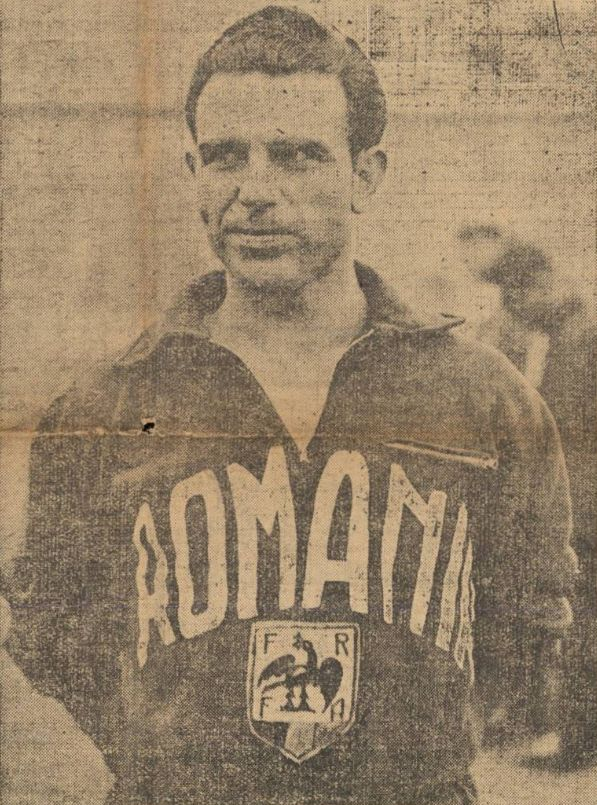
Sfera in the Romanian national kit, c. 1941

On 7 September 1940, Venus announced that it would only field ethnic Romanian players, with Sfera as a mainstay. For a while, the strategy was also changed, and he appeared as a central midfielder in a division match against FC Ploești. The reception was lukewarm, with one reporter noting that he could not even achieve mediocrity in that new role. The Hungarian paper Déli Hírlap similarly argued, ahead of Venus' match with Unirea Tricolor on 1 October: "Juhász and Bodola's departure has had a very palpable impact on the team and its offensive power. Management has first tried Sfera in the central defense position, but no matter how excellent a player Sfera is, he can only prevail in the full-back position." Venus lost that home match 2–0. Sfera was credited by reviewers with a "splendid" free-kick; he and Unirea's Ștefan Cârjan were both sent off for on-pitch fighting.

During Sfera's two-month suspension period, Venus' defense was handled by the younger Bondoc Ionescu-Crum, including for a much-expected derby with Rapid. The club was recovering its strength, especially after allowing Alfred Fieraru to handle its midfield line. This resurgence became more evident in November, when the David–Sfera–Negrescu trio was again active in the defense. Venus were eventually defeated by Rapid in the cup final, which remained one of Sfera's greatest regrets.

The club's manager, Petre Steinbach, was called up for military drills in March 1941. Sfera took over as player-coach, but only for a week. On 3 April, he led Venus in a training match against Laromet București, which he won 6–3. His final cap for the national team came on 1 June 1941, when Romania played against Germany. He fully retired some two weeks later, on 12 June, leaving his position to be filled by Ionescu-Crum. It was subsequently revealed that his infant daughter had died of a fever just before one of his final appearances.

== Coach and referee ==
=== World War II and aftermath ===
On 5 August 1941, Sfera took over as Venus coach, with Colea Vâlcov as his assistant. Romania's alliance with Nazi Germany and her participation on the Eastern Front had by then weakened the national championship. Some matches were still being played in mid-August: with Colea Vâlcov serving on the front, Sfera began coaching Venus alongside Petea Vâlcov. He was nominally a player-coach, but could not be fielded, due to a leg injury. For the scheduled local derby against Rapid, he had to be replaced with a new arrival, Vladimir Arsici. The competition went on hiatus before the match could be played; fans resorted to watching training matches of Venus' main team and its reserves. On 24 August, Sfera appeared on the Venus home ground, but was a poor match for Vladimir Cearughin, his adversary for the day.

In October 1941, Sfera was still indicated as a Venus player. It was however announced that he would no longer appear in training matches for the rest of the year. Having entered the Cupa Basarabiei tournament, Venus counted on two other defenders: Iuliu David (who was expected to leave Olympia București) and Traian Iordache. With the passage of racial laws, Sfera became the superintendent of a previously Jewish-owned building. He was at the time head accountant at the Ministry of National Economy, but resigned in early January 1942. The following month, during a period when Jewish clerks were being collectively sacked, he was assigned to an anonymous society, Comerciala Farmaceutică; here, he shadowed Constantin R. Linden, a Jewish employee who was being phased out. Sfera was then employed by Venus in an administrative capacity, with a new contract signed in September 1942. According to Universul, the terms allowed him to ask for a return to the squad, "should he recover in terms of fitness." He was politically active with a "Circle of Banat Natives", also comprising figures from Caius Brediceanu and Petru Nemoianu to Anton Golopenția.

During talks for a Divizia A revival in July 1943, Sfera was said to be considering returning as a defender, and in serious talks with Viforul Dacia București. In September, rumors spread that he would again be playing at Venus. He returned to the spotlight in October 1944, weeks after the anti-Nazi coup. With Steinbach, Dincă Schileru, Emerich Vogl, Samuel Zauber and various other colleagues, he was forming an "Association of Former Footballers", as an advisory body of the FRF. In June 1945, after viewing several trade-union teams, he announced that he would manage Vulturul de Mare, which had a good record in Ilfov County's league tournament. According to one record, this was also a comeback on the pitch, as Vulturul's player-coach. He had abandoned the project by December, when, as the staff writer at Gazeta Sporturilor noted, he was always present at games, but as a spectator.

In late April 1946, Sfera replaced Ionel Mociorniță as coach of FC Carmen București. Under his guidance, the 17-man squad toured Romania, scheduling friendlies with Universitatea, Victoria Cluj, CFR Bacău, FC Craiova, Oltenia Craiova, Libertatea Oradea, Textila, Victoria Sighișoara, and Vitrometan. He quit this job in August, for undisclosed reasons, leaving the club to be managed temporarily by its midfielder, Nicolae Simatoc. Disliked by the increasingly influential Communist Party for being part of Mociorniță's capitalist ventures, Carmen was broken up just ahead of the 1947 season. Sfera resurfaced in September as a referee, overseeing the Socec Lafayette București versus Laromet match, for promotion into Divizia B; and Otto Gagel Factory versus Cauciucul Quadrat, at Turda. In October, he was handling training at Viforul Dacia, under manager Victor Cojocaru.

In January 1948, shortly after the inauguration of a Romanian communist regime, Sfera had switched sports: as an alpine skier, he took part in the Distribuția Cup. As observed by Sportul Popular daily, he managed a mid-tier position with only months of training. During February 1948, he was voted in as a member of the District Football Committee, representing the Association of Referees. He made several returns to coaching: by 29 February, he was under contract with Tăbăcăria Națională's amateur team. Managing the Divizia B side Metalul in February 1955, he took his players for physical training in Predeal, where they also had a friendly with Progresul CPSC. Still employed by Metalul in early 1956, he found his coaching style criticized (as "formulaic" and indifferent to "the new conditions of labor") by the state-appointed observer, Coloman Braun-Bogdan.

=== Final achievements ===
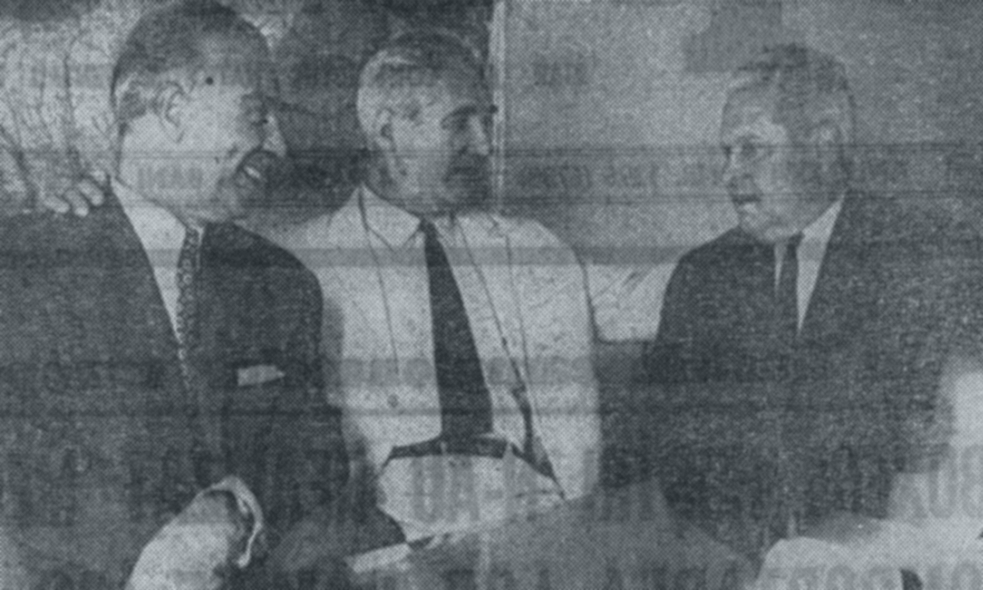
The aged Sfera (on the left), reunited with Mircea David and Gheorghe Albu in June 1971

In old age, Sfera spoke about the need to cultivate sportsmanship, noting that he was still good friends with some of his nominal interwar enemies—from Braun-Bogdan to Nicolae Roșculeț. Ahead of a June 1956 friendly between Romania and Norway, he refereed the (informal and inconclusive) match between Romania and CS Armata, held at 23 August Stadium. He made some returns as a player. In February–March 1957, he captained a Bucharest seniors' team (which included Colea Vâlcov) against a rival squad of provincial seniors, captained by Rudolf Bürger. On 11 August, Sfera and several of his FRF colleagues including Nicolae Gorgorin and Mihai Flamaropol were included on a coaches' squad which defeated Energia Oltenița 1–6, with Sfera scoring once. The following year, Sfera was head coach of the Uzina de Autobuze (the later Rocar), which he helped promote into Divizia C; its owners were the Bucharest Transport Society, which had him as its accountant.

By November 1958, Sfera had moved on, signing with Cetatea Bucur. The latter team, known in later years as Progresul, was a football venture of the National Bank of Romania, where Sfera was clerking. He was additionally an observer for the FRF. During the opening matches for 1966, he graded players across Divizia A. At the time, he stated his enthusiasm for Romania's good showing in international matches, stating that he was especially fond of Dan Coe and Radu Nunweiller. In the 1960s, Sfera was living with his family at an apartment bloc on Timpului Street in Iancului, Bucharest. During a March 1968 interview with Fotbal magazine, he declared that he was primarily an accountant, noting that sports coaching was an "ill-defined" profession with few benefits. He returned to Cluj in October 1969, a guest of honor at Universitatea's golden jubilee.

By August 1971, Sfera was coaching the factory team Vîscoza București in the Honorary County Championship; he was still there in early 1972, when he was also elected to the FRF's Central Colleage of Coaches. He had good results in the 1972–1973 season, with Vîscoza dominating during April 1973. In October 1976, as president of the Bucharest College of Coaches, he commissioned Ștefan Kovács to give lectures on developments in modern football. On 27 March 1977, he appeared on Tîrgu Mureș Stadium to present ASA's László Bölöni and Iuliu Hajnal with "Master Emeritus" badges.

Living through the violent end of communism in December 1989, Sfera met financial hurdles in his final years. In 1991, he was receiving benefits from a special fund, created by FRF with money set aside from international transfers, which had become legal. The 83-year-old Sfera died in Bucharest on 26 August 1992, and was buried by his surviving teammates at Bellu Cemetery. The FRF, whose staff was engaged in debates over technical issues, did not send any delegates. He was outlived by wife Lizica and son Mihai.

== Honors ==
Venus București

- Bucharest City Championship (1): 1935
- Divizia A (3): 1936–37, 1938–39, 1939–40
