= Gheorghe Brandabura =

Romanian footballer

Personal information
- Date of birth: 23 February 1913
- Place of birth: Fedeleșoiu, Argeș, Romania
- Date of death: Unknown
- Position: Midfielder

Senior career*
Years	Team	Apps	(Gls)
1931–1940	Juventus București	152	(1)
1940–1948	Venus București (Note: The Divizia A 1940–41 was the last season before World War II and the Divizia A 1946–47 was the first one after, so the appearances and goals scored during this period for Venus București are not official with the exception of the 1945–46 regional championship, also the statistics for the 1946–47 and 1947–48 Divizia B seasons are unavailable.)	23	(0)
Total		175	(1)

International career
1937–1938	Romania	4	(0)
- * Club domestic league appearances and goals

Gheorghe Brandabura (23 February 1913 – date of death unknown) was a Romanian football midfielder who played for Romania at the 1938 World Cup. He is deceased.

== Club career ==
Brandabura was born on 23 February 1913 in Fedeleșoiu, Argeș, Romania. He began playing football at Juventus București, making his debut under player-coach Emerich Vogl on 5 April 1931 in a 4–2 away victory over Venus București in the Regional championship. In the 1931–32 season, he scored his first goal in a 5–2 home win over Olympia București. In the following season, Brandabura helped Juventus gain promotion to Divizia A after winning the Regional championship and a promotion play-off. He made his debut in the first league on 17 September 1933 under coach Ladislau Csillag in a 3–1 away victory against Ripensia Timișoara. He spent seven seasons with the team in the first league, the highlights of this period being a third place in the 1935–36 season and reaching the Cupa României semi-finals two times in a row. Brandabura left Juventus after the club was relegated in the 1939–40 season. He joined Venus București where he was used by coach Ștefan Auer in two games out of the four in the 1940 Cupa României final against Rapid București which was eventually lost. Brandabura made his last Divizia A appearance on 31 August 1941, playing for Venus in a goalless draw against Rapid. He retired in 1948 after he spent the last two seasons of his career representing Venus in Divizia B.

== International career ==
Brandabura played four games for Romania, making his debut on 8 July 1937 under coach Constantin Rădulescu in a friendly that ended in a 2–0 away win over Lithuania. He was selected by coaches Alexandru Săvulescu and Rădulescu to be part of the squad that participated in the 1938 World Cup. He did not appear in the first game against Cuba, that ended in a 3–3 draw, but Brandabura played in the replay which ended in a surprising 2–1 loss.

== Honours ==
Venus București

- Cupa României runner-up: 1939–40
