= Ioan Lupaș (footballer) =

Romanian footballer

Personal information
- Date of birth: 8 June 1914
- Place of birth: Arad, Romania
- Date of death: 8 April 1981 (aged 66)
- Position: Midfielder

Youth career
- 1928–1933: Olimpia Arad

Senior career*
Years	Team	Apps	(Gls)
1933–1935	ASCAM București		
1935–1938	Gloria Arad	57	(0)
1938–1939	Tricolor Ploiești	22	(0)
1939–1942	Venus București	45	(1)
1942–1944	FC Ploiești (Note: The 1940–41 Divizia A was the last season before World War II and the 1946–47 Divizia A was the first one after, so the appearances and goals scored during this period for FC Ploiești are not official.)		
1944–1945	Venus București		
1945–1946	Gloria Arad		
1946–1947	FC Ploiești		
1947–1950	BNR București		
Total		124	(1)

International career
1939–1943	Romania	8	(0)

Managerial career
- 1952–1953: Electromagnetica București
- 1954: Progresul București (assistant)
- 1955: Progresul București
- 1957–1959: Progresul București
- 1960–1961: Progresul București
- * Club domestic league appearances and goals

Ioan Lupaș (8 June 1914 – 8 April 1981) was a Romanian footballer and manager.

== Club career ==
Lupaș was born on 8 June 1914 in Arad, Romania and began playing junior-level football in 1928 at local club Olimpia. In 1933, he moved to ASCAM București, only to return to Arad two years later to play for Gloria. He made his Divizia A debut on 1 September 1935 in a 2–1 away loss to Universitatea Cluj. In 1938, Lupaș went to play for a one-season spell at Tricolor Ploiești. He then joined Venus București, where he played in a 1–0 victory against AGC Bologna in the 1939 Mitropa Cup quarter-finals, but they did not qualify further because the second leg was lost 5–0. Lupaș played 22 league matches under coach Béla Jánosy in the 1939–40 season and helped the team win the title. The team also reached the 1940 Cupa României final, a four-game series in which Lupaș played in all matches, as they eventually lost the last game and the trophy to Rapid București. He made his last Divizia A appearance on 15 June 1941 in a 4–1 loss to Ripensia Timișoara, totaling 124 matches with one goal in the competition. From 1942 onwards, Lupaș went to play for FC Ploiești before returning to Venus and then moving to his hometown club Gloria. During the 1946–47 Divizia B season, he played once again for FC Ploiești, helping them gain promotion to the first league. Lupaș ended his career after playing from 1947 to 1950 for BNR București.

== International career ==
Lupaș played eight friendly games for Romania, making his debut on 11 June 1939 under coach Virgil Economu in a 1–0 loss to Italy. His last appearance for the national team took place on 13 June 1943 in a 2–2 draw against Slovakia.

== Managerial career ==
Lupaș started his coaching career by leading Electromagnetica București from 1952 to 1953. Subsequently, from 1954 to 1961, he had several tenures at Progresul București. Notably, while co-coaching the club alongside Cornel Drăgușin, he led them to the 1958 Cupa României final where they lost 1–0 to Știința Timișoara. Lupaș also guided the team in the 1961–62 European Cup Winners' Cup, where Progresul was defeated 2–1 on aggregate by Leixões in the first round. Between 1965 and 1967, he was the vice-president of the Romanian Football Federation.

== Death ==
Lupaș died on 8 April 1981 at age 66.

== Honours ==
=== Player ===
Venus București

- Divizia A: 1939–40
- Cupa României runner-up: 1939–40

FC Ploiești

- Divizia B: 1946–47

=== Manager ===
Progresul București

- Cupa României runner-up: 1957–58
