= Bondoc Ionescu-Crum =

Romanian long jumper and footballer

Personal information
- Date of birth: 3 April 1915
- Place of birth: Bregovo, Bulgaria
- Date of death: 24 June 1994 (aged 79)
- Place of death: Brașov, Romania
- Position: Defender

Senior career*
Years	Team	Apps	(Gls)
- Sportul Studențesc București
1938–1944	Venus București (Note: The 1940–41 Divizia A was the last season before World War II and the 1946–47 Divizia A was the first one after, so the appearances and goals scored during this period for Venus București are not official.)	19	(0)

Managerial career
- 1956–1958: Universitatea Craiova
- Tractorul Brașov
- Hidromecanica Brașov
- * Club domestic league appearances and goals as of 8 May 2021 Sports career
- Nationality: Romanian
- Sport: Athletics
- Event: Long jump

Bondoc Ionescu-Crum (3 April 1915 – 24 June 1994) was a Romanian athlete and a football defender and manager.

== Life and career ==
Ionescu-Crum was born on 3 April 1915 in the Bulgarian commune Bregovo to Romanian parents. When he was a child, his family settled in Brașov where he attended the Andrei Șaguna College. In 1934, at the Inter-school Competitions that took place at the Câmpia Libertății in Blaj, he won five events and set a new national record in the long jump of 7.03 meters. He won the title of vice-champion in the same event at the Balkan Games in Istanbul the following year. Ionescu-Crum competed in the men's long jump in the 1936 Summer Olympics. He was also a footballer, playing as a defender for Sportul Studențesc București and Venus București. Ionescu-Crum won the Divizia A title with the latter in the 1938–39 season, playing seven games in the campaign under coach Béla Jánosy. With Venus he also reached the 1940 Cupa României final, playing in one game out of the four in the eventual defeat to Rapid București. He fought for the Romanian Armed Forces in World War II, sustaining injuries and earning decorations for his achievements. After World War II, Ionescu-Crum became a football manager, coaching Universitatea Craiova, Tractorul Brașov and Hidromecanica Brașov. He helped "U" Craiova gain promotion to Divizia B during the 1957–58 season. Ionescu-Crum died on 24 June 1994 in Brașov, Romania at age 79. He received post-mortem the Honorary Citizen of Brașov title, and a street in the city is named after him.

== Honours ==
=== Military decorations ===
- Crucea Comemorativă a celui de-al Doilea Război Mondial 1941–1945 (World War II Commemorative Cross 1941–1945) (1955)

=== Player ===
Venus București

- Divizia A: 1938–39
- Cupa României runner-up: 1939–40

=== Manager ===
Universitatea Craiova

- Divizia C: 1957–58
