= Rudolf Demetrovics =

Romanian footballer

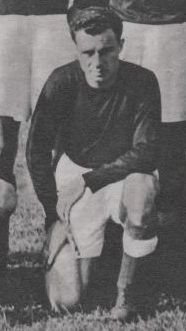

Personal information
- Date of birth: 19 September 1914
- Place of birth: Paks, Austria-Hungary
- Date of death: 2 March 1993 (aged 78)
- Place of death: Wollongong, Australia
- Position: Midfielder

Senior career*
Years	Team	Apps	(Gls)
1933–1938	Chinezul Timișoara	92	(1)
1938–1940	Venus București	39	(0)
1940–1944	Nagyváradi AC	101	(3)
1946–1948	MTV Ingolstadt		
1948–1949	SpVgg Fürth		(0)
1949–1950	MTV Ingolstadt		
Total		229	(4)

International career^{‡}
1935–1940	Romania	8	(0)
- * Club domestic league appearances and goals as of 5 November 2019 ‡ National team caps and goals as of 5 November 2019

Rudolf Demetrovics (19 September 1914 – 2 March 1993), also known as Rudolf Demetrovici, Rudolf Deményi or Rezső Deményi, was a Romanian footballer of Hungarian descent, who played as a midfielder.

Debuted in football by the legendary club Chinezul Timișoara, Demetrovics was an important player of the golden team of Venus București, club with which he won two national titles. Subsequently, he moved to Nagyváradi AC and won another title, this time in Hungary, being again a pillar in a team of the legendary, 1943–1944 generation of NAC, first squad outside Budapest which was crowned as champion of Hungary.

After World War II he ended up in Germany, where he played for MTV Ingolstadt in the highest Bavarian amateur League, the Bayernliga, which was then part of the national second tier of German football. In 1948/49 he played for one season for SpVgg Fürth which then played in the Oberliga Süd, the part of the first tier of Germany, where the club got relegated. After this he returned for one season to Ingolstadt.

Demetrovics then migrated to Australia. He was married and had a daughter and a son.

== International career ==
Rudolf Demetrovics played at international level in 8 matches for Romania.

== Honours ==
Venus București

- Divizia A: 1938–39, 1939–40
- Cupa României: Runner-up 1939–40

Nagyváradi AC

- Nemzeti Bajnokság I: 1943–44

MTV Ingolstadt

- Bavarian Cup: Runner-up 1947
