= 1940 Mitropa Cup =

Tournament details
- Dates: 17 June – 10 July 1940
- Teams: 8

Final positions
- Champions: none

Tournament statistics
- Matches played: 13
- Top scorer: (Hungary) György Sárosi (5 goals)

The 1940 Mitropa Cup was the 14th edition of the Mitropa Cup and the last season played before the competition was interrupted by the Second World War. The competition would be resumed after the war under the name Zentropa Cup but by that time it was overshadowed by the newly formed European Cup which included teams from all parts of Europe. Last season's champions Újpest were eliminated at the quarter-final stage of the competition. This edition is notable for being the first edition in which a team from Romania reached the final. Rapid București of Romania beat Hungária FC MTK Budapest of Hungary in the quarterfinals and got past Građanski of Yugoslavia in the semi-finals to get to the finals in which they were to play Ferencváros. The final was cancelled due to the Second World War.

Eight teams participated in the competition with Hungary and Yugoslavia each sending three teams and Romania sending two. However Czechoslovakia and Italy did not participate because of the war.

== Quarterfinals ==
Team 1	Agg.	Team 2	1st leg	2nd leg
Hungária MTK (Hungary)	1–5	(Romania) Rapid București	1–2	0–3
Beogradski SK (Kingdom of Yugoslavia)	4–0	(Romania) Venus București	1–0	3–0
Slavija (Kingdom of Yugoslavia)	4–11	(Hungary) Ferencváros	3–0	1–11
Građanski (Kingdom of Yugoslavia)	5–0	(Hungary) Újpest	4–0	1–0

== Semifinals ==
Team 1	Agg.	Team 2	1st leg	2nd leg
Građanski (Kingdom of Yugoslavia)	0–0^{a}	(Romania) Rapid București	0–0	0–0
Beogradski SK (Kingdom of Yugoslavia)	1–2	(Hungary) Ferencváros	1–0	0–2

=== Play-off ===
Team 1	Score	Team 2
Građanski (Kingdom of Yugoslavia)	1–1^{b}	(Romania) Rapid București

- ^{a} Match decided by play off.
- ^{b} Match decided by coin toss.

== Finals ==
The final between Rapid București and Ferencváros was scheduled to take place in July 1940. However, due to the events of World War II it was cancelled. Rapid Bucharest's officials have tried negotiating with the Hungarian counterpart in order to play the final, but the Hungarian side refused every scenario (playing the final in one leg, in Budapest, or playing on neutral field in Belgrade) as they could not accept playing against a Romanian team, given their political interest in recovering Transylvania (which was lost by the Hungarians at The Treaty of Trianon signed on 4 June 1920). Romania and Hungary were military rivals during the War, which added to the refusal of Fradi officials to play against Rapid in the final.

More recently, there were rumors that Rapid București would try to win the final retroactively 0–3 by forfeit, as Ferencváros are accused of a lack of fair play by not accepting to have the final played. There are, however, no updates about this.

== Top goalscorers ==
Rank	Player	Team	Goals
1	(Hungary) György Sárosi	(Hungary) Ferencváros	9
2	(Hungary) Károly Finta	(Hungary) Ferencváros	4
2	(Kingdom of Yugoslavia) Vilim Šipoš	(Romania) Rapid București	4
2	(Kingdom of Yugoslavia) Zvonimir Cimermančić	(Kingdom of Yugoslavia) Građanski	4
