= 1938–39 Divizia A =

27th season of top-tier football league in Romania

Divizia A
- Season: 1938–39
- Champions: Venus București
- Top goalscorer: Adalbert Marksteiner (21)

The 1938–39 Divizia A was the twenty-seventh season of Divizia A, the top-level football league of Romania.

== Teams ==
Location of teams in 1938-39 Divizia A

== League table ==
Pos	Team	Pld	W	D	L	GF	GA	GD	Pts	Qualification or relegation
1	Venus București (C)	22	14	7	1	51	20	+31	35	Champions of Romania
2	Ripensia Timișoara	22	11	4	7	53	39	+14	26	
3	AMEF Arad	22	10	5	7	40	35	+5	25	
4	UD Reșița	22	9	5	8	30	33	−3	23	
5	Rapid București	22	8	5	9	40	33	+7	21	
6	Victoria Cluj	22	9	3	10	38	38	0	21	
7	Carpaţi Baia Mare	22	8	5	9	25	35	−10	21	
8	Juventus București	22	8	4	10	37	37	0	20	
9	Sportul Studenţesc București	22	7	5	10	31	36	−5	19	
10	Chinezul Timișoara (R)	22	6	7	9	48	56	−8	19	Relegation to Divizia B
11	Tricolor Ploiești (R)	22	7	3	12	23	38	−15	17	Relegation to Divizia B
12	Gloria Arad (R)	22	5	7	10	27	43	−16	17	Relegation to Divizia B

Source: LT
Rules for classification: 1) points; 2) goal difference; 3) number of goals scored
(C) Champions; (R) Relegated

=== Results ===
Home \ Away	AME	CAR	CHI	GLA	JUV	RAP	RIP	SPO	TRI	UDR	VEN	VCL
AMEF Arad	—	3–0	5–3	1–1	3–1	4–1	1–3	1–0	2–1	4–0	2–5	0–0
Carpaţi Baia Mare	0–0	—	0–1	1–1	2–1	2–2	3–0	1–1	1–0	4–1	0–2	1–0
Chinezul Timișoara	3–2	1–4	—	2–2	5–1	3–3	3–7	2–1	6–2	0–0	2–2	0–2
Gloria Arad	2–2	0–0	1–6	—	1–1	0–2	2–1	4–1	1–0	1–2	0–1	1–2
Juventus București	0–1	1–2	5–3	4–0	—	0–4	7–2	2–1	2–0	2–2	1–3	2–2
Rapid București	1–1	4–1	5–0	1–3	0–1	—	1–2	1–2	0–2	3–4	4–1	2–1
Ripensia Timișoara	2–0	4–1	1–1	3–2	0–1	2–1	—	7–0	5–0	1–3	1–1	4–1
Sportul Studenţesc București	7–1	1–2	4–1	2–1	1–0	1–1	3–0	—	0–0	0–0	0–1	2–4
Tricolor Ploiești	0–4	4–0	2–2	3–1	1–0	0–2	2–1	0–1	—	2–1	2–2	2–1
UD Reșița	1–3	2–0	2–0	1–1	2–1	0–1	2–2	2–0	3–0	—	0–4	2–1
Venus București	2–0	1–0	3–2	6–0	1–1	0–0	1–1	2–2	2–0	2–0	—	3–1
Victoria Cluj	2–0	5–0	2–2	1–2	1–3	3–1	3–4	3–1	1–0	1–0	1–6	—

Source: LT
Legend: Blue = home team win; Yellow = draw; Red = away team win.

== Top goalscorers ==
Rank	Player	Club	Goals
1	Adalbert Marksteiner	Ripensia Timişoara	21
2	Iuliu Baratky	Rapid București	15
2	István Klimek	Chinezul Timișoara	15
4	Dănilă Bătrân	AMEF Arad	14
5	Gyula Prassler	Juventus București	13

== Champion squad ==
Venus București

Goalkeepers: Mircea David (12 / 0); Nicolae Iordăchescu (10 / 0).
Defenders: Lazăr Sfera (20 / 1); Gheorghe Albu (17 / 3); Bondoc Ionescu-Crum (7 / 0).
Midfielders: Andrei Bărbulescu (15 / 1); Rudolf Demetrovics (17 / 0); Vasile Gain (17 / 0); Theodor Beffa (Greece) (9 / 0); Alfred Eisenbeisser (8 / 0).
Forwards: Cornel Orza (21 / 7); Silviu Ploeșteanu (22 / 3); Kostas Choumis (14 / 9); Iuliu Bodola (22 / 12); Traian Iordache (11 / 5); Petea Vâlcov (10 / 1); Nicolae Ene (10 / 7).
(league appearances and goals listed in brackets)

Manager: Béla Jánosy (Hungary) .

== See also ==
- 1938–39 Divizia B
