= Silviu Ploeșteanu =

Romanian footballer and manager

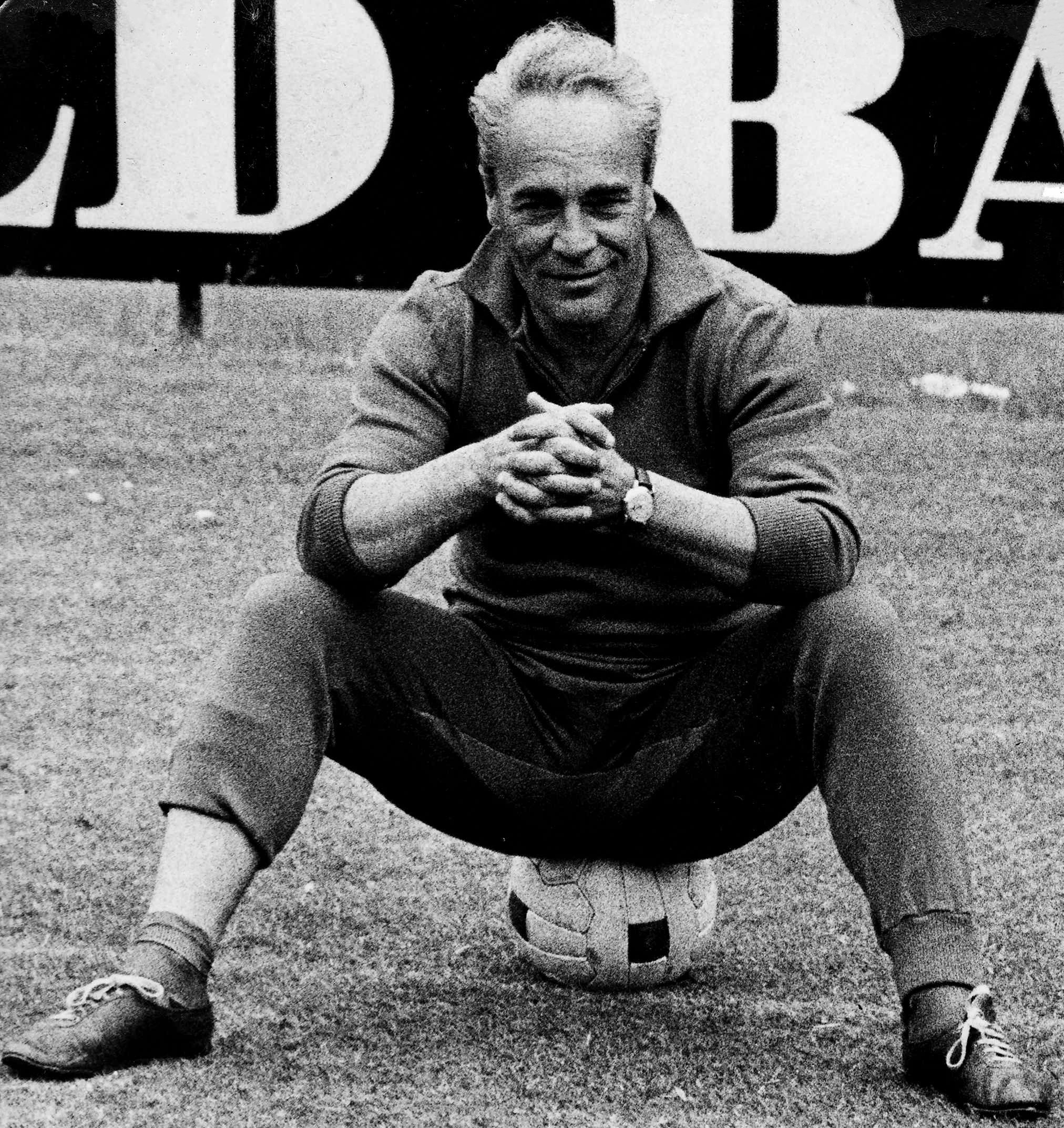
- Ploeșteanu in 1963, coach of Romania's national team

Personal information
- Date of birth: 28 January 1913
- Place of birth: Craiova, Romania
- Date of death: 13 April 1969 (aged 56)
- Position: Striker

Senior career*
Years	Team	Apps	(Gls)
1930–1932	UD Reșița		
1932–1937	Universitatea Cluj	87	(30)
1937–1946	Venus București (Note: The Divizia A 1940–41 was the last season before World War II and the Divizia A 1946–47 was the first one after, so the appearances and goals scored during this period for Venus București are not official with the exception of the 1945–46 regional championship.)	88	(18)
1948–1949	UA Brașov		
Total		175	(48)

International career^{‡}
1937–1941	Romania	11	(1)

Managerial career
- 1948–1968: Steagul Roșu Brașov
- 1962–1963: Romania
- 1964: Romania Olympic
- 1968–1969: Tractorul Brașov
- * Club domestic league appearances and goals as of March 2010 ‡ National team caps and goals as of March 2010

Silviu Ploeșteanu (28 January 1913 – 13 April 1969) was a Romanian footballer and manager.

== Club career ==
Ploeșteanu, nicknamed Ploaie (Rain), was born on 28 January 1913 in Craiova, Romania and began playing football in 1930 at UD Reșița, winning the Divizia A title in his first season as a footballer. In the following season he was a runner-up in the league with Reșița. After this, he transferred to Universitatea Cluj, where he again secured a runner-up position in his first year with the team. In the next season, he reached the 1934 Cupa României final with "U", where he scored a goal in the first game as they lost the trophy to Ripensia Timișoara.

In 1937, Ploeșteanu switched teams again, joining Venus București. He won with them two consecutive Divizia A titles under coach Béla Jánosy. He contributed with three goals scored in 22 matches during the 1938–39 season, and four goals in 21 games during the 1939–40 season. The team also reached the 1940 Cupa României final, a four-game series in which Ploeșteanu played in all matches, scoring a goal in the first before they eventually lost the last game to Rapid București. During his time with Venus, he made six appearances in the Mitropa Cup over three editions, suffering first-round exits to Újpest—against whom he scored a goal—AGC Bologna, and Beogradski SK. Ploeșteanu ended his career by spending one year as a player-coach in the regional championship at UA Brașov.

== International career ==
Ploeșteanu played 11 games and scored one goal for Romania, making his debut on 8 July 1937 under coach Constantin Rădulescu in a 2–0 friendly away win over Lithuania. He scored a goal in a game against Germany and was captain in a 2–1 victory against Yugoslavia. His last appearance for the national team took place on 12 October 1941 in a 3–2 success over Slovakia.

=== International goals ===
Scores and results list Romania's goal tally first. "Score" column indicates the score after the player's goal.

#	Date	Venue	Opponent	Score	Result	Competition
1	14 July 1940	Riederwaldstadion, Frankfurt am Main, Nazi Germany	Germany	2–7	3–9	Friendly

== Managerial career ==
Ploeșteanu started his managerial career at Steagul Roșu Brașov in 1948, while also being a player in the first year. He helped Steagul get promoted from the regional championship to Divizia B in 1950. Subsequently, in 1956 they earned promotion to Divizia A. There, he earned a runner-up position in the 1959–60 season. During his tenure, the team made some European performances such as winning the 1960–61 Balkans Cup. The club also reached the 1965–66 Inter-Cities Fairs Cup round of 16 where they were eliminated by Espanyol Barcelona, despite earning a 4–2 victory against them.

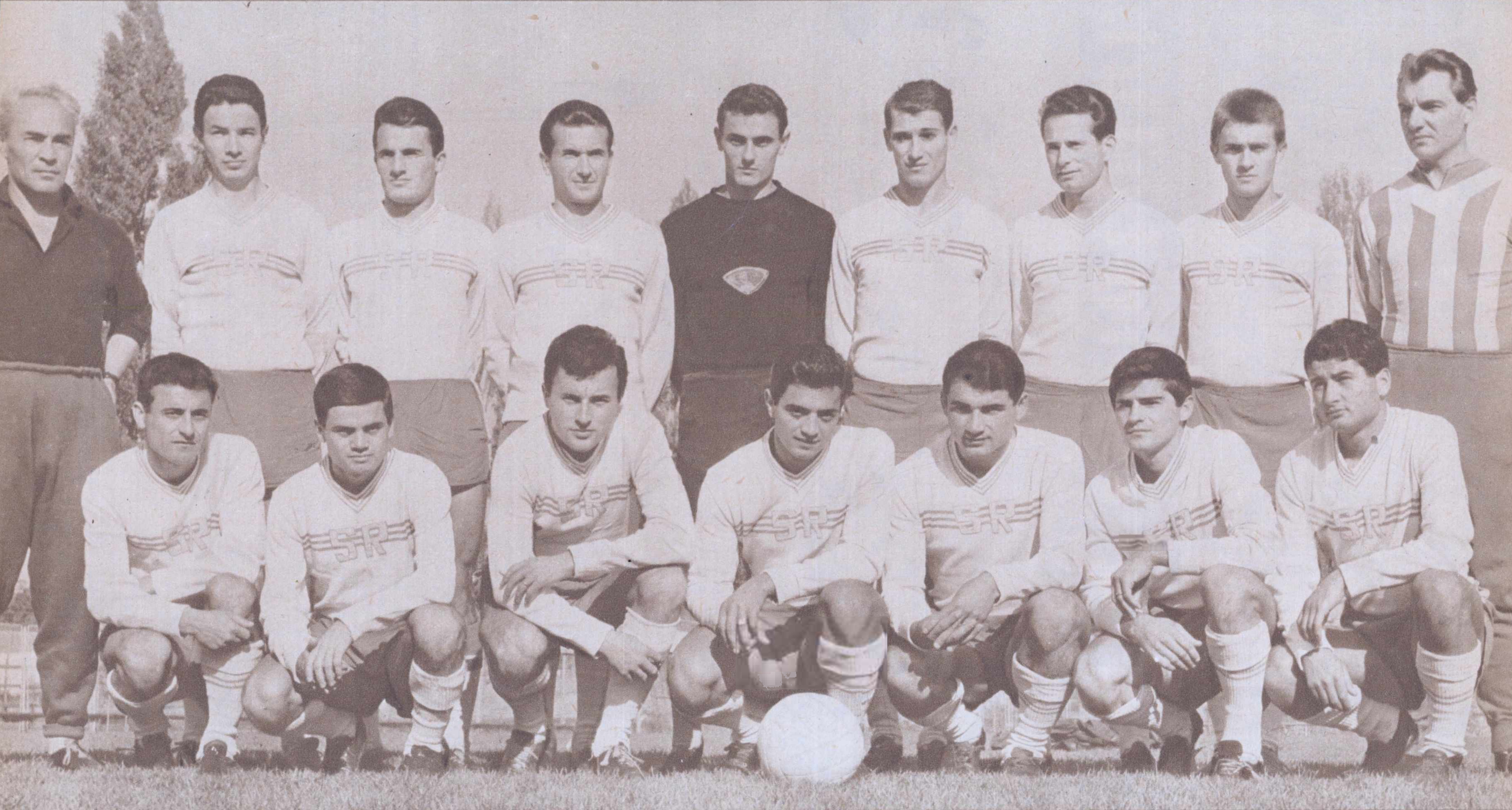
Ploeșteanu (first from the left, back row) as head coach of Brașov in 1965

In 1962, Ploeșteanu also started coaching Romania's national team, while simultaneously coaching Steagul. He led the national team in four friendly games which consisted of one victory, two draws and one loss. Afterwards he coached Romania's Olympic team, qualifying for the 1964 Summer Olympics where the team finished in fifth place. In January 1967, Ploeșteanu decided to change Steagul's colors from white and blue to black and yellow. He believed that the team would be seen better on the field in the new colors. His player, Csaba Györffy, inspired this decision. Györffy had participated with Romania's Olympic team in a tournament in Uruguay and, after a match against Peñarol, received the shirt worn by captain Alberto Spencer. Subsequently, Györffy wore this shirt during his training sessions with the team. After 20 years with Steagul, Ploeșteanu was dismissed when the team finished last in the 1967–68 season, leading to their relegation to Divizia B.

His last coaching experience took place at Tractorul Brașov from 1968 until 1969. Ploeșteanu has a total of 249 Divizia A games as a manager, consisting of 104 victories, 49 draws and 96 losses. Former Steagul player, Emanoil Hașoti said about Ploeșteanu:"Everything I know in football I know from our beloved coach Silviu Ploeșteanu. He taught us that to succeed you need measure, common sense, heart, character and passion".

== Personal life and death ==
Ploeșteanu was known as an anti-communist, telling everyone with whom he interacted: "Never call me comrade! I was born a sir and I will always be a sir". He died of a heart attack on 13 April 1969 at age 56. People who were close to him claim that one of the reasons for his death was the sadness following being dismissed by Steagul Roșu Brașov after coaching it for 20 years. The Stadionul Silviu Ploeșteanu in Brașov is named in his honor.

== Honours ==
=== Player ===
UD Reșița

- Divizia A: 1930–31, runner-up 1931–32

Universitatea Cluj

- Divizia A runner-up: 1932–33
- Cupa României runner-up: 1933–34

Venus București

- Divizia A: 1938–39, 1939–40
- Cupa României runner-up: 1939–40

=== Manager ===
Steagul Roșu Brașov

- Divizia A runner-up: 1959–60
- Divizia B: 1956
- Balkans Cup: 1960–61

== See also ==
- List of longest managerial reigns in association football
