= Petre Rădulescu =

Romanian footballer (1915–1980)

Personal information
- Date of birth: 1 July 1915
- Place of birth: Bucharest, Romania
- Date of death: 10 September 1980 (aged 65)
- Position: Goalkeeper

Youth career
- 1927–1932: Unirea Tricolor București

Senior career*
Years	Team	Apps	(Gls)
1932–1936	Unirea Tricolor București	52	(2)
1936–1941	Rapid București	62	(0)
1942–1943	Venus București (Note: The Divizia A 1940–41 was the last season before World War II and the Divizia A 1946–47 was the first one after, so the appearances during this period for Venus București are not official.)	0	(0)
Total		114	(2)

International career
1935	Romania	1	(0)

Managerial career
- 1953–1954: Politehnica Iași
- 1955: Universitatea Cluj
- 1962–1963: Aurul Brad
- 1963–1965: Gaz Metan Mediaș
- 1965–1967: Crișul Oradea
- 1967–1970: Politehnica Galați
- 1970–1972: Metalul Târgoviște
- 1972–1974: SC Bacău
- 1974–1975: Syria
- * Club domestic league appearances and goals

Petre Rădulescu (1 July 1915 – 10 September 1980) was a Romanian footballer who played as a goalkeeper and a manager.

== International career ==
Petre Rădulescu played one game at international level for Romania, when he came as a substitute and entered in the 84th minute of a friendly against Sweden.

== Honours ==
Rapid București

- Cupa României: 1936–37, 1937–38, 1938–39, 1939–40, 1940–41
