= Traian Iordache =

Romanian footballer and coach

Personal information
- Date of birth: 10 October 1911
- Place of birth: Bucharest, Romania
- Date of death: 3 April 1999 (aged 87)
- Place of death: Iași, Romania
- Position: Striker

Youth career
- 1927–1932: Teișor București

Senior career*
Years	Team	Apps	(Gls)
1932–1938	Unirea Tricolor București	38	(34)
1938–1945	Venus București	55	(32)
1945–1946	Carmen București	10	(9)
Total		103	(75)

International career
1938–1940	Romania B	3	(1)
1938–1942	Romania	3	(0)

Managerial career
- 1950–1953: Farul Constanța
- 1957–1958: Știința Iași
- 1962–1963: CSMS Iași
- * Club domestic league appearances and goals

Traian Iordache (10 October 1911 – 3 April 1999) was a Romanian football striker and coach.

== Club career ==
Iordache was born on 10 October 1911 in Bucharest, Romania and began playing football in 1927 at local club Teișor. He joined Unirea Tricolor București in 1932. Subsequently, Iordache made his Divizia A debut on 30 August 1936 under coach Petre Steinbach in an 8–1 victory against Chinezul Timișoara in which he scored one goal. Until the end of the 1936–37 season, he scored 21 goals which made him the league top-scorer alongside Ripensia Timișoara's Ștefan Dobay.

In 1938, Iordache joined Venus București, and in his first season, he played 11 matches with five goals scored under coach Béla Jánosy to help the club win the title. He won another title in the 1939–40 season, this time scoring 14 goals in 21 matches under the guidance of Jánosy. The team also reached the 1940 Cupa României final, a four-game series in which Iordache played in all matches, scoring a goal in the first and the third before they eventually lost the last game to Rapid București. During his time with Venus, Iordache made three appearances in the Mitropa Cup over two editions, suffering first-round exits to AGC Bologna and Beogradski SK. He made his last Divizia A appearance on 15 June 1941 in a 4–1 loss to Ripensia Timișoara, totaling 93 matches with 66 goals in the competition. Iordache retired in 1946 after playing one season for Carmen București.

== International career ==
From 1938 to 1940, Iordache played three matches and scored once for Romania B.

Iordache played three friendly games for Romania, making his debut on 8 May 1938 under coach Constantin Rădulescu in a 1–0 loss to Yugoslavia. The following two matches, which resulted in losses to Germany and Slovakia, took place in 1942.

== Managerial career ==
Iordache coached Farul Constanța from 1950 to 1953. Afterwards, he coached Știința Iași during the 1957–58 Divizia B season. He led the club —which was renamed CSMS Iași— once again for 27 rounds in the 1962–63 Divizia A season. Subsequently, he worked for the club's junior center, teaching generations of players, including Vasile Iordache.

== Death ==
Iordache died on 3 April 1999 at the age of 87.

== Honours ==
Venus București

- Divizia A: 1938–39, 1939–40
- Cupa României runner-up: 1939–40

Individual

- Divizia A top scorer: 1936–37 (joint with Ștefan Dobay)
