= Cornel Orza =

Romanian footballer

Personal information
- Date of birth: 9 January 1916
- Place of birth: United States
- Date of death: 25 October 1989 (aged 73)
- Place of death: Iernut, Romania
- Position: Striker

Youth career
- 1928–1929: CS Turda
- 1929–1933: Mureșul Târgu Mureș

Senior career*
Years	Team	Apps	(Gls)
1933–1934	Mureșul Târgu Mureș	10	(4)
1934–1937	Universitatea Cluj	39	(10)
1937–1938	CA Oradea	18	(9)
1938–1944	Venus București (Note: The Divizia A 1940–41 was the last season before World War II and the Divizia A 1946–47 was the first one after, so the appearances during this period for Venus București are not official.)	33	(14)
Total		100	(37)

International career
1938–1940	Romania	7	(1)
- * Club domestic league appearances and goals

Cornel Orza (9 January 1916 – 25 October 1989) was a Romanian footballer who played as a striker.

== International career ==
Cornel Orza made seven appearances at international level for Romania, scoring in his debut against Germany which ended with a 1–4 loss.

== Honours ==
Universitatea Cluj

- Cupa României runner-up: 1933–34

Venus București

- Divizia A: 1938–39, 1939–40
- Cupa României runner-up: 1939–40
