= Gyula Prassler =

Romanian footballer

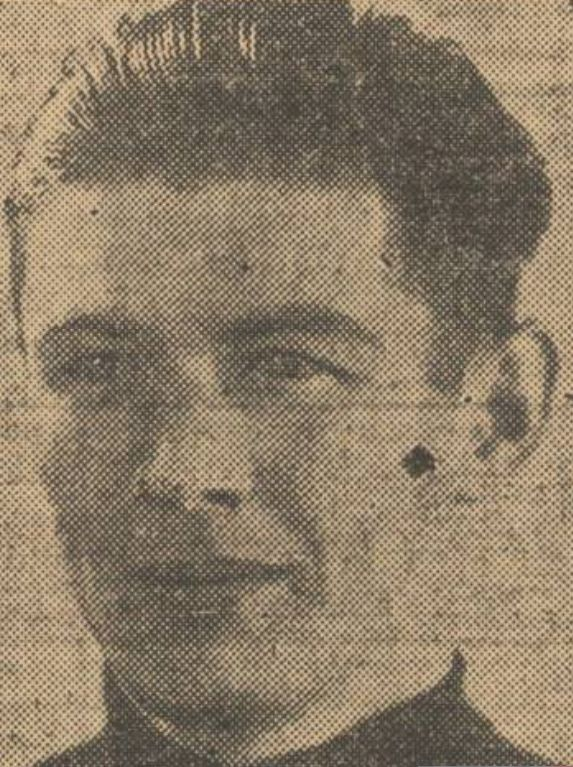

Personal information
- Full name: Gyula Prassler / Iuliu Iosif Prassler
- Date of birth: 1916
- Place of birth: Uioara, Alba, Romania
- Date of death: 1942 (aged 25–26)
- Position: Forward

Senior career*
Years	Team	Apps	(Gls)
1933–1936	Phoenix Baia Mare		
1936–1938	AMEF Arad	37	(18)
1938–1940	FC Juventus București	40	(21)
1940–1941	SE Baia Mare		

International career
1938	Romania	2	(0)
- * Club domestic league appearances and goals

Gyula Prassler (also known as Iuliu Iosif Prassler; 1916–1942) was a Romanian football forward who played for Romania in the 1938 FIFA World Cup.
