= Iosif Slivăț =

Romanian footballer

Personal information
- Date of birth: 19 February 1915
- Place of birth: Lugoj, Romania
- Date of death: Unknown
- Height: 1.86 m (6 ft 1 in)
- Position: Defender

Senior career*
Years	Team	Apps	(Gls)
1932–1934	Vulturii Lugoj		
1934–1935	Ripensia Timișoara	1	(0)
1935–1938	Olimpia Satu Mare (Note: The statistics for the 1935–36 and 1936–37 Divizia B seasons are unavailable.)	17	(1)
1938–1940	AMEF Arad	43	(1)
1940–1941	Rapid București	11	(1)
1941–1942	Gamma	16	(0)
1946	AMEF Arad		
1947–1949	ITA Arad	27	(0)
Total		115	(2)

International career
1939–1940	Romania	3	(0)
- * Club domestic league appearances and goals

Iosif Slivăț (born 19 February 1915) was a Romanian football defender.

== International career ==
Iosif Slivăț played three friendly games at international level for Romania, making his debut in a friendly which ended with a 1–0 loss against Italy.

== Honours ==
Ripensia Timișoara

- Divizia A: 1934–35
- Cupa României runner-up: 1934–35

Rapid București

- Cupa României: 1939–40, 1940–41

UTA Arad

- Divizia A: 1946–47, 1947–48
