= Alfred Eisenbeisser =

Romanian footballer and figure skater (1908–1991)

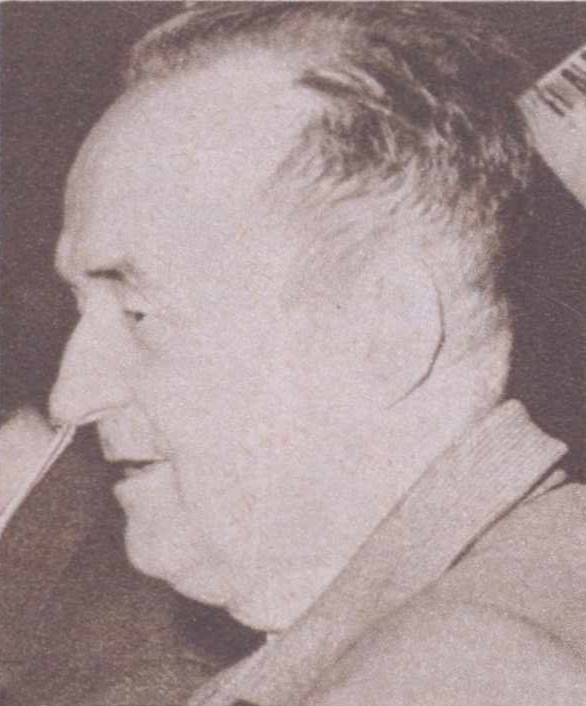

Personal information
- Full name: Alfred Eisenbeisser
- Date of birth: 7 April 1908
- Place of birth: Chernivtsi, Austria-Hungary (now Ukraine)
- Date of death: 1 July 1991 (aged 83)
- Place of death: Berlin, Germany
- Position: Midfielder

Youth career
- 1923–1928: Jahn Cernăuți

Senior career*
Years	Team	Apps	(Gls)
1928–1930	Jahn Cernăuți		
1930–1932	Dragoș Vodă Cernăuți		
1932–1944	Venus București	114	(16)

International career
1930–1939	Romania	9	(0)
- * Club domestic league appearances and goals

Alfred Eisenbeisser (Romanian: Alfred "Fredi" Fieraru) (7 April 1908 in Cernăuţi, Austria-Hungary (now in Ukraine) - 1 July 1991 in Berlin, Germany) was a Romanian football player and figure skater of German ethnicity. As a footballer, he played for Romania at 1930 FIFA World Cup, while as a figure skater he participated at the 1936 Winter Olympic Games.

== Career ==
=== Football ===
Alfred Eisenbeisser started his career at Jahn Cernăuţi. In 1930, he joined another team from Cernăuţi, Dragoş Vodă, and shortly after he was selected in the Romania squad for the 1930 FIFA World Cup. He made his debut for the Romania national football team at the tournament, playing in the two matches against Peru and Uruguay.

On the trip back to Romania, he nearly died because of pneumonia, after having a bath with cold water. When the ship arrived to Genoa, Italy, he was interned in a sanatory. The Romanian staff called also a priest to make a Eucharist service, because his condition was critical.

When the Romanian players returned in the country, they announced Alfred's death. However, he recovered and returned home, exactly when his mother was preparing the funeral repast. She fainted when she saw her son alive.

After playing two years for Dragoș Vodă Cernăuți, he moved to Venus București. He made his debut in October 1932, against CA Oradea. In his second of the ten seasons spent as a Venus player, he won his first Divizia A champion title. He won another two championships in 1937 and 1939.

He retired from his footballing career in 1944.

=== Figure skating ===
Alfred was also a successful figure skater. At the 1934 European Figure Skating Championships, he and his partner Irina Timcic finished seventh in the mixed pair events.

Again with Irina Timcic, he took part at the 1936 Winter Olympics, finishing 13th. His last major figure skating competition was the mixed pair event at the 1939 European Championships, when he and his partner Ileana Moldovan finished 9th.

== Achievements ==
=== Football ===
Venus București

- Divizia A (4): 1933–34, 1936–37, 1938–39, 1939–40

=== Figure skating ===
- European Figure Skating Championship : 7th (1934 - with Irina Timcic), 9th (1939 - with Ileana Moldovan)
- Winter Olympic Games : 13th (1936 - with Irina Timcic)

== See also ==
- Bukovina Germans
