= Vintilă Cossini =

Romanian footballer

Personal information
- Date of birth: 21 November 1913
- Place of birth: Constanța, Romania
- Date of death: 24 June 2000 (aged 86)
- Position: Midfielder

Youth career
- 1927–1931: Tricolor Constanța

Senior career*
Years	Team	Apps	(Gls)
1931–1932	Tricolor Constanța		
1932–1941	Rapid București	163	(7)

International career
1935–1941	Romania	25	(0)
- * Club domestic league appearances and goals

Vintilă Cossini (21 November 1913 – 24 June 2000) was a Romanian football midfielder who played for Romania in the 1938 FIFA World Cup. He spent most of his career playing for Rapid București.

== Honours ==
Rapid București

- Cupa României (5): 1936–37, 1937–38, 1938–39, 1939–40, 1940–41
