= Iosif Lengheriu =

Romanian footballer

Personal information
- Date of birth: 24 May 1914
- Place of birth: Uioara, Romania
- Date of death: 11 September 1991 (aged 77)
- Position: Midfielder

Senior career*
Years	Team	Apps	(Gls)
1933–1934	Mihai Vitezul Alba Iulia		
1934–1935	Ceramica Bistrița		
1935–1936	Crișana Oradea	19	(9)
1936–1946	Rapid București (Note: The Divizia A 1940–41 was the last season before World War II and the Divizia A 1946–47 was the first one after, so the appearances and goals scored during this period for Rapid București are not official with the exception of the 1945–46 regional championship.)	92	(15)
1947–1949	Grivița CFR București		
1949–1953	Laromet București		
Total		111	(24)

International career
1939–1941	Romania	7	(0)

Managerial career
- 1946: Rapid București
- 1953–1955: Locomotiva Timișoara
- 1956–1959: Locomotiva Constanța
- 1959–1963: Chimia Făgăraș
- 1963–1966: CSM Sibiu
- 1966: Victoria Roman
- 1966–1967: Foresta Fălticeni
- 1967–1969: Electronica București
- 1969–1971: Laromet București
- 1971–1973: Flacăra Moreni
- 1973–1974: Electronica București
- 1974–1976: CFR Timișoara
- 1976–1978: IMIX Agnita
- * Club domestic league appearances and goals

Iosif Lengheriu (24 May 1914 – 11 September 1991) was a Romanian footballer and manager.

== International career ==
Iosif Lengheriu played seven games at international level for Romania, making his debut in a friendly which ended with a 1–0 loss against Italy.

== Honours ==
=== Player ===
Rapid București

- Cupa României: 1936–37, 1937–38, 1938–39, 1939–40, 1940–41, 1941–42

=== Manager ===
Farul Constanța

- Divizia B: 1957–58

Foresta Fălticeni

- Cupa României runner-up: 1966–67
