= 1939–40 Divizia A =

28th season of top-tier football league in Romania

Divizia A
- Season: 1939–40
- Champions: Venus București
- Top goalscorer: István Avar (21)

The 1939–40 Divizia A was the twenty-eighth season of Divizia A, the top-level football league of Romania.

== Teams ==
Location of teams in 1939-40 Divizia A

== League table ==
Pos	Team	Pld	W	D	L	GF	GA	GD	Pts	Qualification or relegation
1	Venus București (C)	22	14	3	5	59	19	+40	31	Champions of Romania
2	Rapid București	22	11	7	4	64	31	+33	29	
3	Sportul Studențesc București	22	8	11	3	42	31	+11	27	
4	UD Reșița	22	8	9	5	43	42	+1	25	
5	CAM Timișoara	22	9	5	8	37	49	−12	23	
6	Carpaţi Baia Mare	22	9	4	9	41	41	0	22	
7	Ripensia Timișoara	22	8	6	8	36	37	−1	22	
8	AMEF Arad	22	10	1	11	37	39	−2	21	
9	Unirea Tricolor București	22	8	5	9	36	40	−4	21	
10	Gloria CFR Galaţi	22	8	1	13	27	59	−32	17	
11	Juventus București (R)	22	4	6	12	36	48	−12	14	Relegation to Divizia B
12	Victoria Cluj (R)	22	4	4	14	18	40	−22	12	Relegation to Divizia B

Source: LT
Rules for classification: 1) points; 2) goal difference; 3) number of goals scored
(C) Champions; (R) Relegated

=== Results ===
Home \ Away	AME	CAM	CAR	GAL	JUV	RAP	RIP	SPO	UDR	UTB	VEN	VCL
AMEF Arad	—	6–1	3–0	0–1	1–2	3–1	3–0	1–1	2–0	3–1	0–3	2–1
CAM Timișoara	3–0	—	3–2	4–3	3–2	4–1	1–1	1–3	0–0	1–1	1–3	2–1
Carpaţi Baia Mare	0–1	6–2	—	5–2	5–3	1–0	2–2	1–1	2–0	0–2	0–4	2–0
Gloria CFR Galaţi	1–0	2–2	1–0	—	3–1	1–7	0–2	0–5	0–2	1–0	0–2	1–3
Juventus București	4–2	0–1	3–4	1–2	—	2–2	5–1	3–3	5–2	0–0	0–3	0–1
Rapid București	4–0	4–0	7–3	6–0	4–1	—	3–2	6–1	1–1	3–2	1–1	2–0
Ripensia Timișoara	5–2	2–2	1–0	0–1	3–0	1–1	—	2–2	4–4	3–1	2–1	2–1
Sportul Studențesc București	2–1	2–3	0–0	2–3	1–1	4–4	2–0	—	2–2	4–0	2–1	2–0
UD Reșița	2–0	3–0	2–2	3–2	2–2	2–1	3–0	0–0	—	5–4	0–3	5–2
Unirea Tricolor București	0–3	4–2	0–3	4–1	3–1	0–0	1–0	0–0	8–3	—	0–5	0–0
Venus București	7–1	3–0	4–0	6–2	2–0	2–2	2–1	2–3	0–0	1–2	—	3–0
Victoria Cluj	0–3	0–1	0–3	4–0	0–0	0–4	0–2	0–0	2–2	1–3	2–1	—

Source: LT
Legend: Blue = home team win; Yellow = draw; Red = away team win.

== Top goalscorers ==
Rank	Player	Club	Goals
1	István Avar	Rapid București	21
2	Iuliu Bodola	Venus București	17
3	Adalbert Marksteiner	Ripensia Timișoara	15
4	Traian Iordache	Venus București	14
4	Gheorghe Popescu I	Sportul Studențesc București	14

== Champion squad ==
Venus București

Goalkeepers: Mircea David (20 / 0); Nicolae Iordăchescu (2 / 0).
Defenders: Lazăr Sfera (22 / 0); Alexandru Negrescu (21 / 0); Gheorghe Albu (1 / 0).
Midfielders: Rudolf Demetrovics (22 / 0); Gusztáv Juhász (22 / 0); Ioan Lupaș (22 / 0).
Forwards: Andrei Bărbulescu (4 / 3); Nicolae Ene (8 / 3); Cornel Orza (11 / 7); Silviu Ploeșteanu (21 / 4); Kostas Choumis (8 / 5); Iuliu Bodola (22 / 17); Traian Iordache (21 / 14); Dumitru Cârciog (4 / 2); Petea Vâlcov (11 / 4).
(league appearances and goals listed in brackets)

Manager: Béla Jánosy (Hungary) .

== See also ==
- 1939–40 Divizia B
