= István Avar =

German footballer and manager (1905–1977)

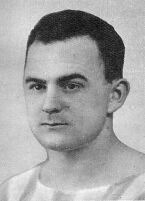

Personal information
- Full name: István Avar/Ștefan Auer
- Date of birth: 28 May 1905
- Place of birth: Arad, Austria-Hungary
- Date of death: 13 October 1977 (aged 72)
- Place of death: Kaposvár, Hungary
- Height: 1.76 m (5 ft 9 1/2 in)
- Position: Forward

Senior career*
Years	Team	Apps	(Gls)
1919–1926	AMEF Arad	25	(41)
1926–1927	Colțea Brașov	11	(19)
1928–1935	Újpest FC	150	(161)
1936–1941	Rapid București	73	(56)
1941–1943	Kaposvári Rákóczi	69	(50)
Total		328	(327)

International career
1926–1927	Romania	2	(3)
1929–1935	Hungary	21	(24)

Managerial career
- 1938–1939: Rapid București
- 1940–1941: Rapid București
- 1941–1943: Kaposvári Rákóczi
- 19??–1955: Kaposvári Dózsa
- 1957: Kaposvári Kinizsi
- 1959–1960: Kaposvári Kinizsi
Medal record
Representing Hungary
Central European International Cup
Bronze medal – third place	1931-32 Central European International Cup
Bronze medal – third place	1933-35 Central European International Cup
- * Club domestic league appearances and goals

István Avar (German: Stefan Auer, Romanian: Ștefan Auer) (28 May 1905 – 13 October 1977) was a footballer and manager of German descent who at various times competed for both Hungary and Romania as a forward. He played for Újpest FC, most famous for playing for the Hungary national team in the 1934 World Cup. He was born in Arad, Hungary, which became part of Romania in 1920.

With Újpest, Avar won the Mitropa Cup in 1929, being the competition's top scorer with ten goals, and the Coupe des Nations in 1930. After 1941, he became the player-manager of Kaposvári Rákóczi. He died in Kaposvár in 1977, aged 72.

== Honours ==
=== Player ===
Újpest FC

- Nemzeti Bajnokság I (4): 1929–30, 1930–31, 1932–33, 1934–35
- Mitropa Cup (1): 1929
- Coupe des Nations 1930

Rapid București

- Romanian Cup (5): 1936–37, 1937–38, 1938–39, 1939–40, 1940–41

==== International ====
Hungary

- Central European International Cup: Bronze: 1931-32
- Central European International Cup: Bronze: 1933-35

=== Coach ===
Rapid București

- Romanian Cup (3): 1938–39, 1939–40, 1940–41

=== Individual ===
- Central European International Cup top scorer: 1931-32 - 8 goals
- Divizia A 73 matches – 56 goals
- First Division Hungary 150 matches – 162 goals
- Topscorer of Divizia A 1940 – 21 goals
- European Cups (Mitropa Cup) (7 matches – 1 goal)
