= Vilmos Sipos =

Hungarian footballer and manager

Personal information
- Date of birth: 24 January 1914
- Place of birth: Wilhelmsburg, Austria-Hungary
- Date of death: 25 July 1978 (aged 64)
- Place of death: Paris, France
- Position: Striker

Youth career
- –1930: Građanski Sr.Mitrovica

Senior career*
Years	Team	Apps	(Gls)
1930–1931	Jugoslavija Belgrade	6	(1)
1932–1935	Građanski Zagreb	35	(8)
1935–1936	Young Boys	24	(?)
1936–1937	FC Sète	15	(2)
1937–1939	Građanski Zagreb	25	(6)
1939–1942	Rapid București (Note: The 1940–41 Divizia A was the last season before World War II and the 1946–47 Divizia A was the first one after, so the appearances during this period for Unirea Tricolor București are not official with the exception of the 1945–46 regional championship.)	38	(17)
1942–1946	Ferencváros	121	(32)
1946–1947	Bologna	9	(0)
1947–1948	Correggio		
1948–1949	Grosseto	22	(3)
1949–1951	Arsenale Messina	34	(?)
- FC Jeunesse Oran

International career
1934–1939	Yugoslavia	13	(1)
1945–1946	Hungary	2	(0)

Managerial career
- FC Jeunesse Oran
- * Club domestic league appearances and goals

Vilmos Sipos (24 January 1914 – 25 July 1978), also known as Vilim Šipoš and Willy Sipos, was a Hungarian football player and manager. He played for several clubs in a number of countries, having represented Yugoslavia and Hungary at the national level.

== Career ==
Born in Wilhelmsburg, Austria, ethnically Hungarian, he began playing with SK Građanski Sremska Mitrovica, a local club in Vojvodina. There he was spotted by SK Jugoslavija who offered him to move to Belgrade in 1930. After one season he moved to the Yugoslav First League, HŠK Građanski where he played until 1934. By 1934 the Yugoslav Football Association invited him to play for the Yugoslavia national team, having debuted on 18 March 1934 in a match against Bulgaria, a 2–1 win.

After the end of the war in 1945, Ferencváros finished in 5th place in 1946. In summer 1946 Sipos accepted an offer from Italian Bologna FC, coached by the Hungarian József Viola. The club had dominated the Serie A by the late 1930s winning 4 titles between 1935 and 1941, but that season, 1946–47 Bologna finished 5th. Sipos left next summer, but stayed in Italy where he played with several clubs such as Correggio, Grosseto and Arsenale Messina. Before retiring he played one season in French Algeria with FC Jeunesse Oran where he was simultaneously the main coach and player.
