= 1939–40 Cupa României =

Tournament details
- Country: Romania

Final positions
- Champions: Rapid București
- Runners-up: Venus București

The 1939–40 Cupa României was the seventh edition of Romania's most prestigious football cup competition.

The trophy was won by Rapid București after 4 finals, first three was draws. They defeated Venus București.

== Format ==
The competition is an annual knockout tournament with pairings for each round drawn at random.

There are no seeds for the draw. The draw also determines which teams will play at home. Each tie is played as a single leg.

If a match is drawn after 90 minutes, the game goes in extra time, and if the scored is still tight after 120 minutes, there a replay will be played, usually at the ground of the team who were away for the first game.

From the first edition, the teams from Divizia A entered in competition in sixteen finals, rule which remained till today.

The format is quite similar to the oldest recognised football tournament in the world, the FA Cup.

== First round proper ==
Team 1	Score	Team 2
8 November 1939
Rapid București (Div. A)	5–2	(District) Socec Lafayette București
12 November 1939
AS Metrom Brașov (Div. B)	2–1	(District) CS Lonea
Unirea Tricolor București (Div. A)	4–0	(District) Viforul Dacia București
IS Câmpia Turzii (Div. B)	2–0	(Div. B) Maccabi București
FC Craiova (Div. B)	0–1	(Div. A) Sportul Studențesc București
FC Ploiești (Div. B)	1–0	(Div. A) Juventus București
Caurom Cernăuți (District)	2–9	(Div. A) Victoria Cluj
Maccabi Chișinău (Div. B)	1–4	(Div. B) AS Constanța
Sparta Mediaș (Div. B)	2–6	(Div. A) Venus București
Olimpia CFR Satu Mare (Div. B)	3–1	(Div. A) Gloria CFR Galați
Carmen București (District)	5–2	(Div. B) Gloria Arad
SSMR Reșița (Div. B)	5–2 (a.e.t.)	(Div. A) UD Reșița
Metalosport Ferdinand (District)	1–2	(Div. A) CAM Timișoara
FC Brăila (Div. B)	2–1	(Div. A) AMEF Arad
Dragoş Vodă Cernăuţi (Div. B)	4–3	(Div. A) Ripensia Timișoara
18 February 1939
Carpați Baia Mare (Div. A)	4–0	(District) Olympia București

== Second round proper ==
Team 1	Score	Team 2
27 February 1940
CAM Timișoara	1–5	Sportul Studențesc București
Victoria Cluj	5–2	IS Câmpia Turzii
Venus București	5–2	Carmen București
Olimpia CFR Satu Mare	1–2 (a.e.t.)	FC Brăila
Carpați Baia Mare	3–0 (forfeit)	SSMR Reșița
AS Metrom Brașov	0–3 (forfeit)	Dragoş Vodă Cernăuţi
AS Constanța	0–3 (forfeit)	Rapid București
6 March 1940
Unirea Tricolor București	1–2 (a.e.t.)	FC Ploiești

== Quarter-finals ==
Team 1	Score	Team 2
16 March 1940
Venus București	3–1	Carpați Baia Mare
17 March 1940
Sportul Studențesc București	6–2	Dragoş Vodă Cernăuţi
Rapid București	2–0	FC Ploiești
FC Brăila	2–0	Victoria Cluj

== Semi-finals ==
Team 1	Score	Team 2
28 April 1940
FC Brăila	0–2	Rapid București
Venus București	4–2	Sportul Studențesc București

== Final ==
30 April 1940
17:45 EET

Rapid București	2–2 (a.e.t.)	Venus București
Baratky 22'; Sipos 33'	Report	Iordache 42'; Ploeşteanu 86'

ONEF, Bucharest
Attendance: 20,000
Referee: Emil Kroner (Bucharest)

== Replay ==
9 June 1940
17:45 EET

Rapid București	4–4 (a.e.t.)	Venus București
Gavrilescu 8'; Baratky 10'; Sipos 61'; Auer 79'	Report	Humis 5', 18'; Orza 16'; Bodola 52'

ONEF, Bucharest
Attendance: 14,000
Referee: Emil Kroner (Bucharest)

== Second replay ==
27 October 1940
17:45 EET

Rapid București	2–2 (a.e.t.)	Venus București
Baratky 59', 93'	Report	Iordache 85'; Eisenbeisser 103'

Giulești, Bucharest
Attendance: 12,000
Referee: Tică Iliescu (Bucharest)

== Third replay ==
8 November 1940
14:30 EET

Rapid București	2–1	Venus București
Baratky 57'; Gavrilescu 74'	Report	Eisenbeisser 86'

ONEF, Bucharest
Attendance: 12,000
Referee: Mihail Petrescu (Bucharest)

Cupa României 1939–40 winners

5th title
