= FC Venus București =

Venus București
- Full name: Asociația Fotbal Club; Venus 1914 București
- Nicknames: Negrii din Splai (The Blacks from Splai); Dracii negri (Black Devils)
- Short name: Venus
- Founded: 1914; 112 years ago 2014; 12 years ago (refounded)
- Ground: Biruința
- Capacity: 100
- Chairman: Robert Țicleanu
- Manager: Harvey Copeland
- League: Liga V
- 2025–26: Liga V, Bucharest, 6th
- Website: https://www.venusbucuresti.ro/
Home colours	Away colours

Asociația Fotbal Club Venus 1914 București, commonly known as Venus București, or simply as Venus, is a Romanian amateur football club based in Bucharest, founded in 1914 and re-founded in 2014. The club is currently playing in the Liga IV - București.

Venus players are nicknamed Negrii (English: The Blacks) due to their all black shirts. Before being dissolved by the Communist authorities, Venus was the most successful football club in Romania, winning seven Liga I championships.

The club's colours are black and white, and the club crest is an eight-pointed white star.

== History ==
Period	Name
1915–1948	Venus București
1948–1949	Venus UCB București
2014–present	Venus București

The club was established in 1914 in the old neighborhood of Venus, Bucharest. The team played at the Venus stadium that opened in 1931. It had a capacity of 15,000 spectators and it became the first stadium in Romania to host a match under floodlights in 1935.

The club won 7 national titles which came in 1920, 1929, 1932, 1934, 1937, 1939 and finally in 1940. It never managed to win the Romanian Cup having been beaten by local rivals Rapid București in the final in 1940 as well as losing to the same opponents in the semi-finals in 1937, 1938, 1939, 1941 and 1942.

The club also took part in three editions of the Mitropa Cup:

- 1937 Mitropa Cup – Last 16: Venus București 4–6 Ujpest and Ujpest 4–1 Venus București
- 1939 Mitropa Cup – Quarterfinals: Venus București 1–0 Bologna and Bologna 5–0 Venus București
- 1940 Mitropa Cup – Quarterfinals: BSK Beograd 3–0 Venus București and Venus București 0–1 BSK Beograd

In 1948, due to communist regime norms that stated that all sport associations had to join a trade-union or a governmental institution, the team was forced to merge with "UCB" ("Uzinele Comunale București" – Administration of Sewerage Systems). In 1949 the league was dissolved and the team disbanded.

In 2014 the team was reestablished and competed in Liga IV, Bucharest, fourth tier of the Romanian football, finishing 7th in Seria II.

== Stadium ==
The club plays its home matches on Stadionul Biruința in Bucharest due to demolition of the Venus Stadium in 1953.

== Honours ==
=== Leagues ===
Liga I:

- Winners (7): 1919–20, 1928–29, 1931–32, 1933–34, 1936–37, 1938–39, 1939–40

Liga V – Bucharest

- Winners (1): 2021–22

=== Cups ===
Cupa României:

- Runners-up (1): 1939–40

== Former managers ==
- (Hungary) Franz Platko 1936–37
- (Hungary) Béla Jánossy 1938–40

== League history ==
Season	Tier	Division	Place	Notes
2026–27	5	Liga V (Bucharest)	TBD	In progress
2025–26	5	Liga V (Bucharest)	6th	
2024–25	5	Liga V (Bucharest, Series I)	4th	
2023–24	4	Liga IV (Bucharest)	9th	
2022–23	4	Liga IV (Bucharest)	7th	
2021–22	5	Liga V (Bucharest, Series II)	2nd	Promoted
2020–21	—	—	—	No senior league
2019–20	5	Liga V (Bucharest, Series I)	—	Season curtailed
2018–19	5	Liga V (Bucharest, Series I)	8th	
2017–18	4	Liga IV (Bucharest)	15th (R)	Relegated
2016–17	4	Liga IV (Bucharest)	12th	
2015–16	4	Liga IV (Bucharest)	7th	
2014–15	4	Liga IV (Bucharest, Series II)	7th	Refounded
1949–2014	Not active			
1948–49	3	Divizia C (Series IV)	11th	Venus UCB; dissolved
1947–48	2	Divizia B	15th (R)	Venus UCB
1946–47	2	Divizia B (Series I)	5th	
1945–46	—	—	—	No league
1944–45	—	—	—	No league
1943–44	—	Wartime championship	12th	Abandoned
1942–43	—	Wartime championship	4th	Unofficial
1941–42	—	Cupa Basarabiei	—	Wartime
1940–41	1	Divizia A	4th	
1939–40	1	Divizia A	1st (C)	Champions
1938–39	1	Divizia A	1st (C)	Champions
1937–38	1	Divizia A (Group II)	2nd	
1936–37	1	Divizia A	1st (C)	Champions
1935–36	1	Divizia A	5th	
1934–35	1	Divizia A	3rd	
1933–34	1	Divizia A (Group I)	1st (C)	Champions
1932–33	1	Divizia A (Group II)	4th	
1931–32	1	Divizia A	1st (C)	Champions
1930–31	2	Bucharest Regional Championship	5th	
1929–30	2	Bucharest Regional Championship	2nd	
1928–29	1	Divizia A	1st (C)	Champions
1927–28	2	Bucharest Regional Championship	3rd	
1926–27	2	Bucharest–Ploiești Regional Championship	3rd	
1925–26	2	Bucharest–Ploiești Regional Championship	4th	
1924–25	1	Divizia A	Quarter-finals	Regional champions
1923–24	1	Divizia A	Quarter-finals	Regional champions
1922–23	1	Divizia A	Semi-finals	Regional champions
1921–22	2	Bucharest–Ploiești Regional Championship	2nd	
1920–21	Regional	Bucharest competitions	2nd	Cupa Harwester
1919–20	1	Divizia A	1st (C)	Champions
1916–19	No championship because of World War I			
1914–16	—	—	—	Only friendly matches

Champions
Runners-up
Third place
Relegated
