= Viorel Kraus =

Romanian footballer

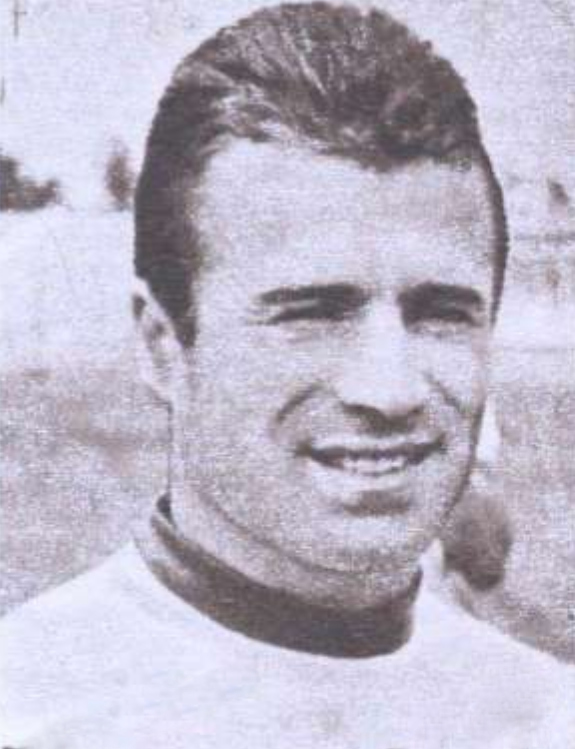
- Kraus in 1972

Personal information
- Date of birth: 5 March 1940 (age 86)
- Place of birth: Alba Iulia, Romania
- Position: Forward

Youth career
- Rapid București
- 1956–1958: Progresul CPCS

Senior career*
Years	Team	Apps	(Gls)
1959–1960	Soda Ocna Mureș		
1960–1961	Industria Sârmei Câmpia Turzii		
1961–1967	Rapid București	91	(18)
1967–1969	Argeș Pitești	45	(12)
1969–1970	Altay Izmir	24	(1)
1970–1974	Sportul Studențesc (Note: The statistics for the 1970–71 and 1971–72 Divizia B seasons are unavailable.)	31	(0)
Total		191	(31)

International career
1963	Romania U23	2	(1)
1967	Romania B	1	(0)

Managerial career
- 1981–1982: Rapid București
- 1982–1983: Makedonikos
- 1984: Rapid București (assistant)
- 1985: Rapid București
- 1986: Bihor Oradea
- 1987: Rapid București
- 1989–1990: Sportul Studențesc
- 2003–2004: Al Raed
- 2004–2005: Al Taawon
- * Club domestic league appearances and goals

Viorel Kraus (born 5 March 1940) is a former professional footballer who played as a forward for clubs in Romania and Turkey. Later working as a manager, he had three stints at Rapid București as well as in Greece and Saudi Arabia.

== Early life ==
Kraus, nicknamed "Neamțul" (The German) due to his Transylvanian Saxon origin, was born on 5 March 1940 in Alba Iulia, Romania. His father, Alfred, worked as a driver at the Luther brewery, while his mother was a pediatric nurse at a children's hospital. After World War II, his father, because of his German origins, was sent to forced labor in a Soviet Gulag from which he never returned. In his early childhood, Kraus was first introduced to football by watching Russian soldiers stationed in Alba Iulia play. Later, he went to observe the training sessions of Unirea Alba Iulia and CFR Alba Iulia on a field close to his home. For a long time during the Soviet occupation of Romania, Kraus and his mother were pressured to change their surname. The authorities urged Kraus to adopt the name "Creț" or his mother's maiden name, "Crișan", but he refused; eventually, however, his mother reverted to her maiden name. Coach Nicolae Negru spotted Kraus's football potential when he was between 12 and 13 years old. After spending time in the youth ranks at Rapid București, Kraus moved on to Progresul CPCS București at age 16.

== Club career ==
=== Early career ===
Kraus began his senior career by playing for one and a half years at Soda Ocna Mureș in the third league. He moved to Divizia B club Industria Sârmei Câmpia Turzii for the 1960–61 Divizia B season, scoring almost 30 goals for them.

=== Rapid București ===
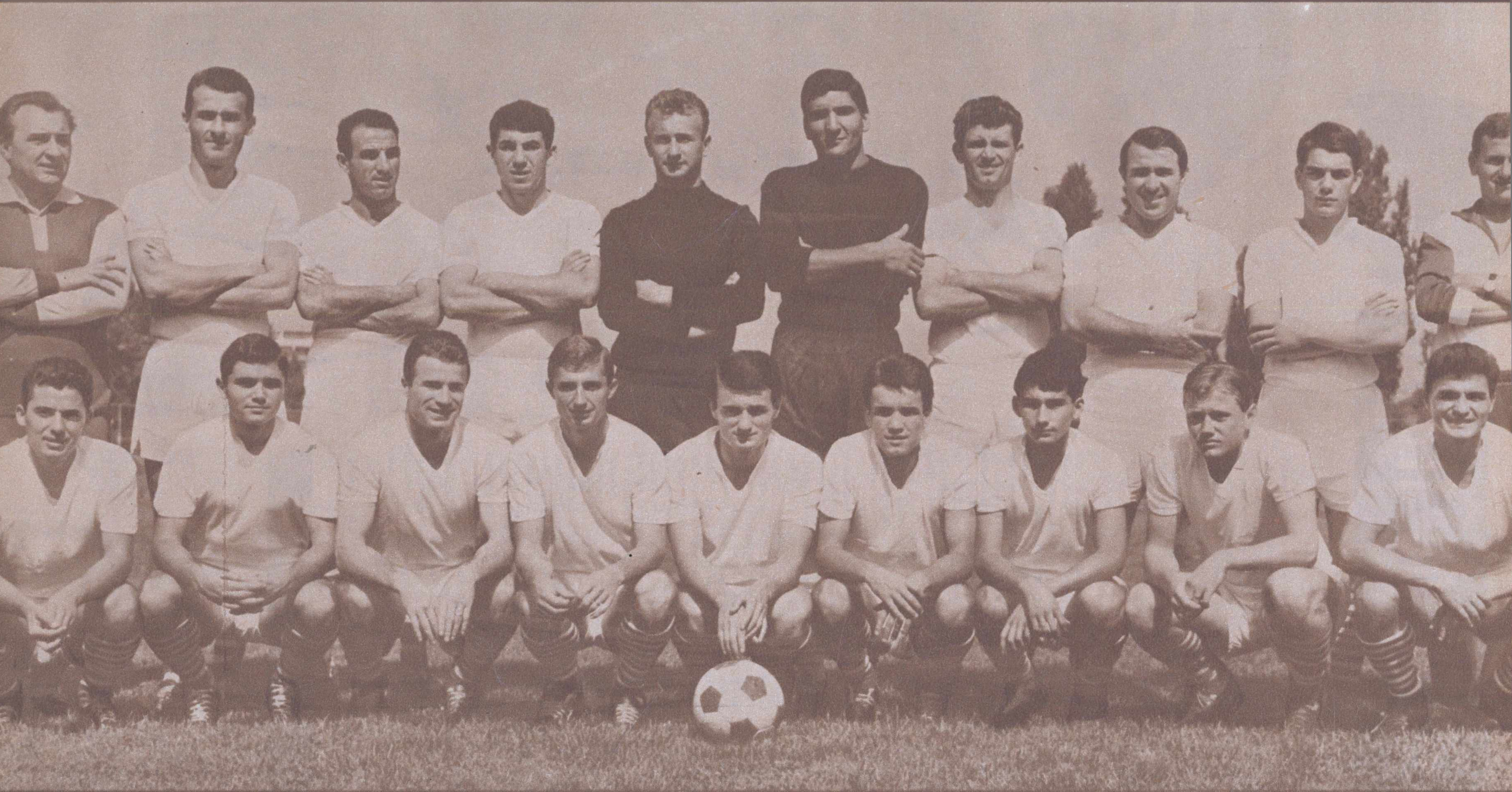
Kraus (front row, third from the left) with Rapid in 1965.

In the summer of 1961, Kraus joined Rapid București. He made his Divizia A debut on 20 August 1961 under Ion Mihăilescu in a 3–0 win over Minerul Lupeni, a match in which Kraus provided an assist to Leahevici's goal and then scored himself following a pass from Titus Ozon. Subsequently, he scored a goal against goalkeeper Ion Voinescu to help his side earn a 2–0 victory against rivals Steaua București in the 1960–61 Cupa României semi-finals. In the final, he played the entire match under coach Mihăilescu in the 2–1 loss to Arieșul Turda. In the next edition of the Cupa României, Rapid reached once again the final, this time losing 5–1 to Steaua, but Mihăilescu did not use Kraus in the game. In the following years, he helped the club win two Balkans Cups. He also helped the club win the 1966–67 Divizia A, their first title, playing in 12 matches and scoring twice under coach Valentin Stănescu.

=== Argeș Pitești ===
In 1967, shortly after winning the league title with Rapid, Kraus moved to Argeș Pitești where he played alongside his idol Nicolae Dobrin. In his first match, he scored a brace in a 2–0 win over Rapid with the Sportul newspaper writing: "Rapid București – Viorel Kraus 0–2!". He then played in both legs and scored once in the 5–3 aggregate loss to Ferencváros in the first round of the 1967–68 Inter-Cities Fairs Cup. In the next edition of the same competition, he played four matches, helping his side eliminate Leixões in the first round before they were defeated by Göztepe in the second round.

=== Altay Izmir ===
In 1969, alongside his former Rapid teammate Ion Motroc, Kraus went to play in Turkey for Altay Izmir under coach Ted Dumitru. His Turkish league debut took place on 5 October in a 0–0 home draw against Altınordu. On 21 December, he scored a goal in a 3–1 away win over Ankaragücü. That was his only goal scored in his 24 league appearances made during the 1969–70 season, as the team finished in third place.

=== Sportul Studențesc ===
In 1970, Kraus returned to Romania to play for Divizia B side Sportul Studențesc, which was coached by Ion Motroc. He helped them gain promotion to the first league at the end of the 1971–72 season. After two more seasons with Sportul, Kraus ended his career in 1974, totaling 167 Divizia A matches with 30 goals.

== International career ==
In 1963, Kraus played two matches for Romania's under-23 national team: a 1–1 draw against East Germany, in which he scored once, and a 3–0 loss to Poland. Later, in 1967, he made an appearance for Romania B in a 2–2 draw against Poland.

== Managerial career ==
Kraus began his coaching career by leading Rapid București during the 1981–82 Divizia B season. Subsequently, he coached Greek side Makedonikos, where one of his players was compatriot Marius Ciugarin. He led them for the first 25 rounds of the 1982–83 Alpha Ethniki season before Michalis Bellis replaced him, and the team eventually suffered relegation to the second league.

Kraus began the 1984–85 Divizia A campaign as Victor Stănculescu's assistant at Rapid, before stepping in as head coach for the second half of the season. In the following years, he had coaching spells at Bihor Oradea, Rapid and Sportul Studențesc.

Kraus also coached in Saudi Arabia. He coached Al Raed during the 2003–04 season and Al Taawon the following season, with both stints in the second league.

== Personal life ==
His son, who is also named Viorel Kraus, played football for Rapid București and Sportul Studențesc. Moving to the United States at age 21, Kraus Jr. established the "World Soccer School" for young players. He later founded "InterFC", a club that won several Arizona state championships. Subsequently, he returned to Romania and founded the "VK Soccer" club which played in the Romanian lower leagues.

== Honours ==
Rapid București

- Divizia A: 1966–67
- Cupa României runner-up: 1960–61, 1961–62
- Balkans Cup: 1963–64, 1964–66

Sportul Studențesc

- Divizia B: 1971–72
