= Ilie Greavu =

Romanian footballer

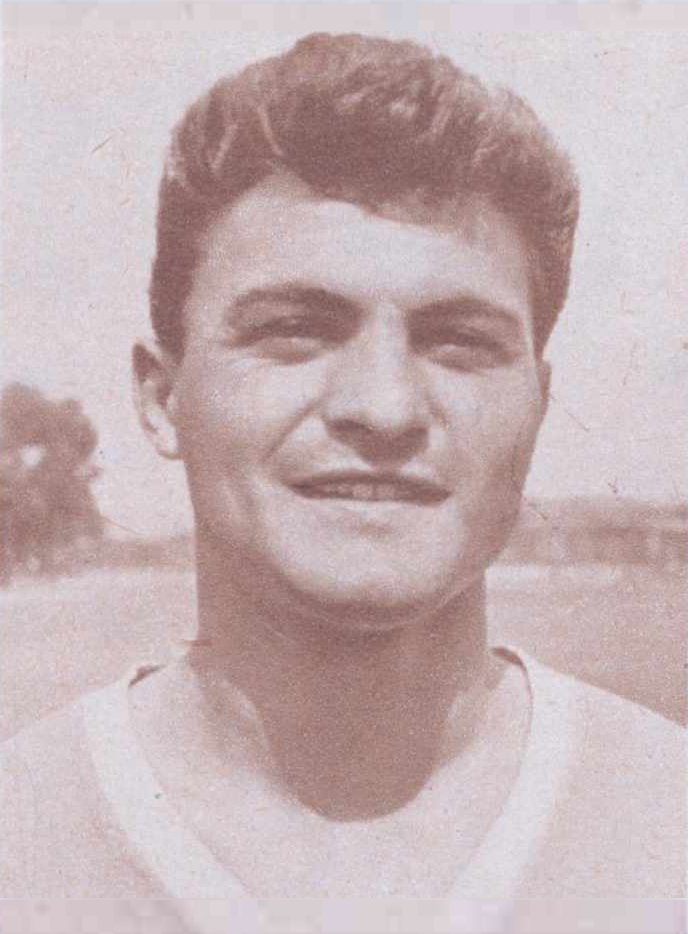
- Greavu in 1963

Personal information
- Date of birth: 19 July 1937
- Place of birth: Sibiu, Romania
- Date of death: 1 April 2007 (aged 69)
- Height: 1.65 m (5 ft 5 in)
- Position: Left back

Youth career
- 1952–1954: Progresul Sibiu

Senior career*
Years	Team	Apps	(Gls)
1955–1956	Progresul CPCS București		
1957–1971	Rapid București	294	(1)

International career
1961–1966	Romania (Note: Including 12 appearances for Romania's Olympic team.)	22	(0)

Managerial career
- 1988: Rapid București
- * Club domestic league appearances and goals

Ilie Greavu (19 July 1937 – 1 April 2007) was a Romanian football defender and manager who spent the majority of his playing career with Rapid București and was part of the team that won the 1966–67 Divizia A title.

== Club career ==
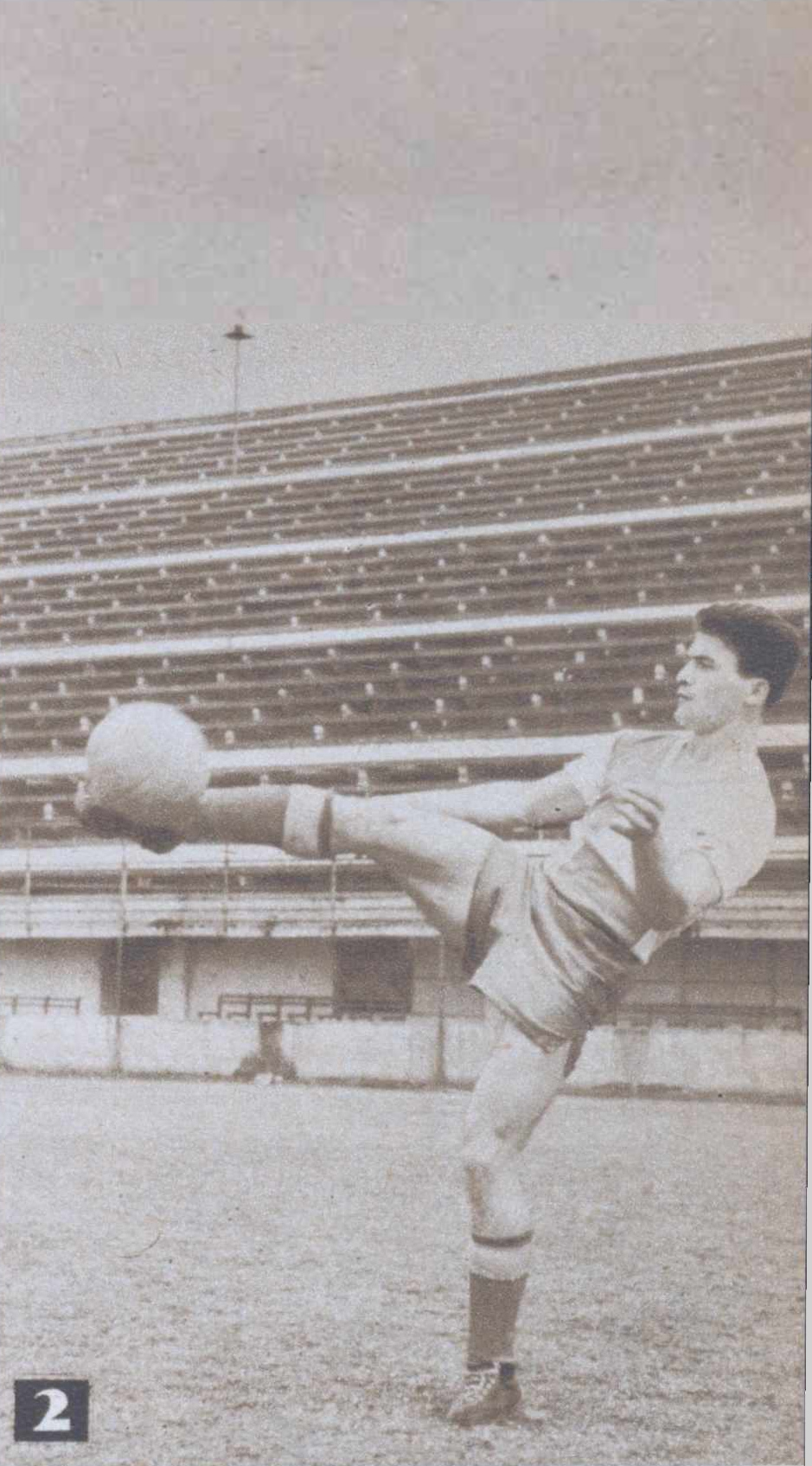
Greavu training with Rapid București in 1963

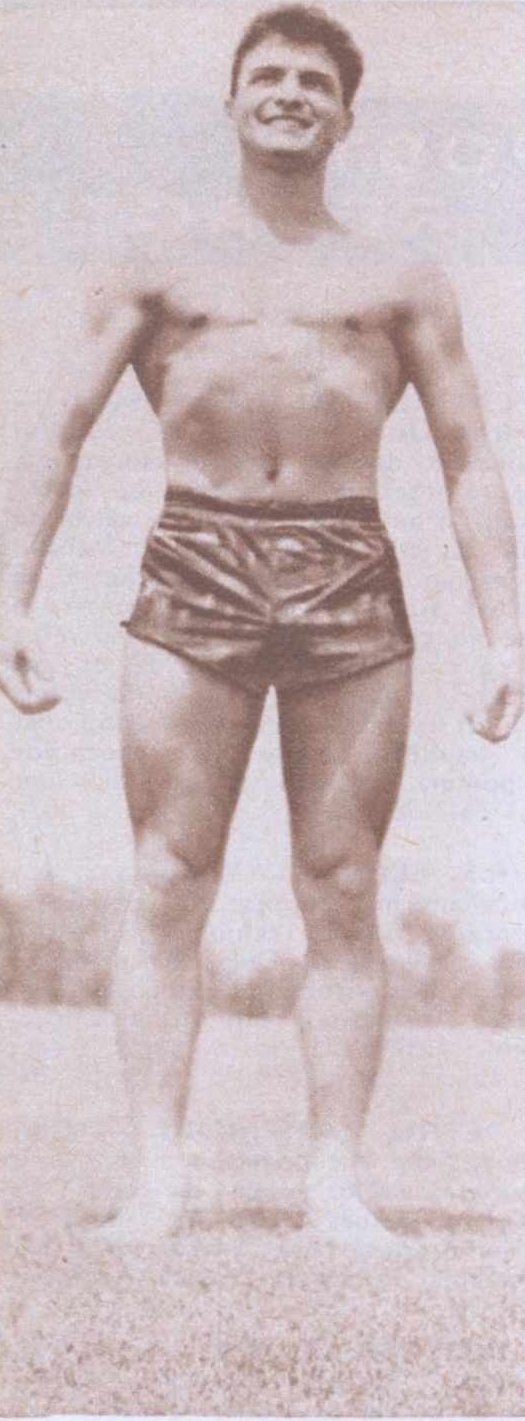
Greavu during a training session in 1965

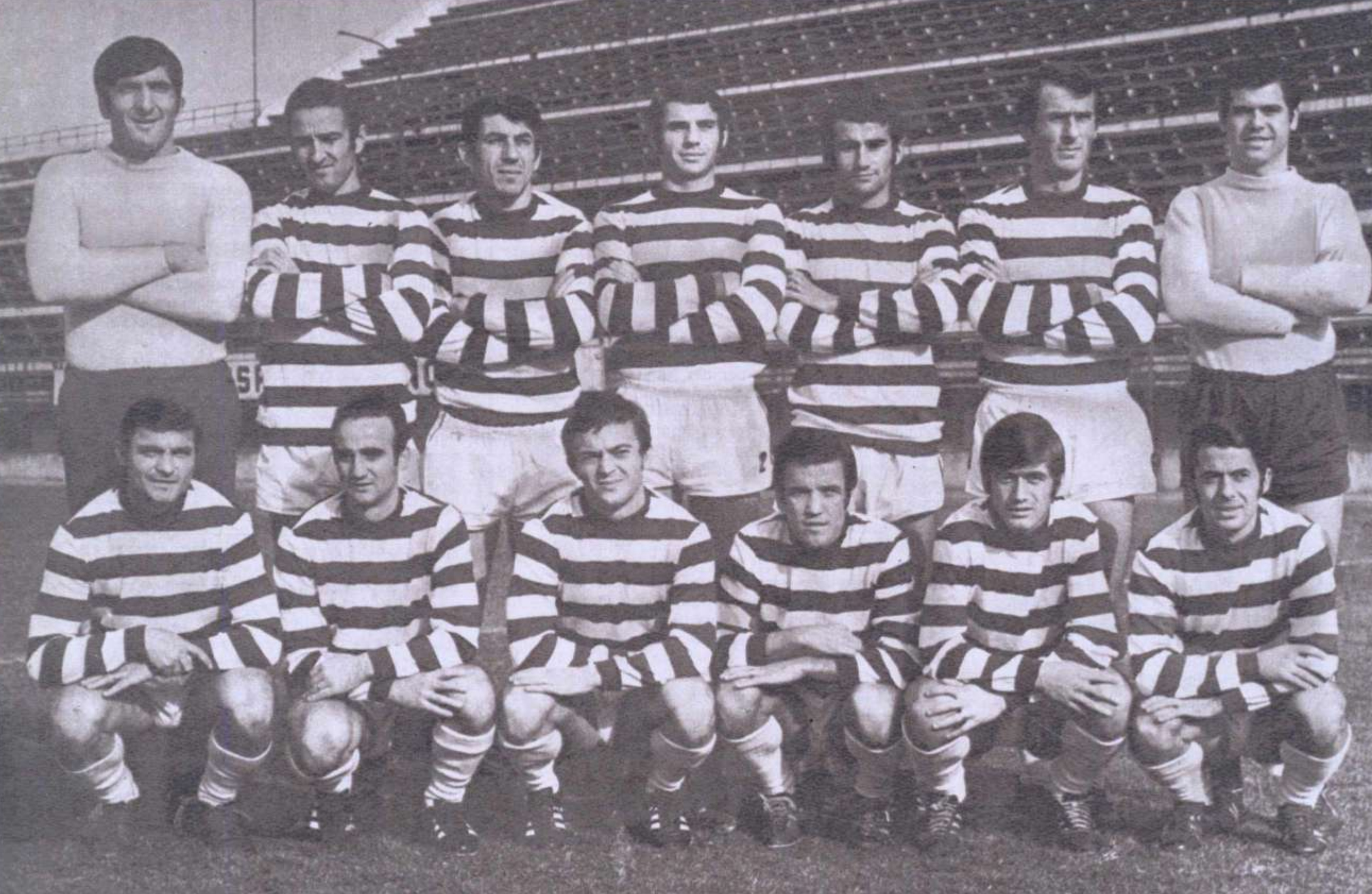
Greavu (bottom, first from left) with Rapid in 1970

He was nicknamed Cauciuc ("Rubber") because his legs were compared to rubber due to their remarkable elasticity, as shown by his ability to leap 1.2 meters into the air. Greavu began playing football in 1952 with local club Progresul Sibiu, before moving to Progresul CPCS București in 1955, where he played in Divizia B. He was then transferred to Rapid București, where he made his Divizia A debut on 28 August 1957 under coach Ferenc Rónay, in a 1–0 away defeat against Energia Petroșani.

He helped Rapid win the 1966–67 Divizia A title, the club's first championship, making 25 appearances under coach Valentin Stănescu. After the final game of the season against Petrolul Ploiești ended in a 0–0 draw and secured the point that mathematically crowned Rapid champions, Greavu recalled: "I played the last thirty minutes with a lump in my throat. Every minute we got closer to the title seemed endless. That half hour was the hardest exam of my life." During his 14-season spell with The Railwaymen, he also won the 1957 Cupa Primăverii and two Balkans Cups in 1964 and 1966. Greavu reached three Cupa României finals, featuring in all of them. The first two, in 1961 and 1962 under coach Ion Mihăilescu, ended in defeats against Arieșul Turda and Steaua București, respectively. In the 1968 final, he was coached by Stănescu as Rapid lost to Dinamo București.

Greavu played seven games in European competitions (including four in the Inter-cities Fairs Cup), taking part in the 1967–68 European Cup campaign, in which he helped Rapid eliminate Trakia Plovdiv before being eliminated by Juventus in the following round.

He made his last Divizia A appearance on 5 June 1971 in a 3–1 home loss to Steagul Roșu Brașov, totaling 294 appearances with one goal in the competition.

== International career ==
Greavu made 10 appearances for Romania, making his debut on 14 May 1961 under coach Gheorghe Popescu in a 1–0 friendly victory against Turkey. He featured in six matches during the 1966 World Cup qualifiers. His last appearance for the national team came on 21 September 1966 in a friendly against East Germany, which ended in a 2–0 defeat. Greavu also played 12 games for Romania's Olympic team and was selected by coach Silviu Ploeșteanu for the squad at the 1964 Summer Olympics in Tokyo, where he featured in all six matches and helped the team finish fifth.

== Later life and death ==
After retiring, Greavu worked at Rapid București as vice-president from 1972 to 1974. He also served as both head coach and assistant coach of the senior team, as well as coach of the club's youth center, where he helped develop generations of players, including Stelian Marin, Ion Ion, Iosif Damaschin, Marian Rada and Daniel Niculae.

In 2004, Greavu had both legs amputated following health complications related to severe arthritis and diabetes. He died on 1 April 2007, at the age of 69, after suffering a heart attack.

== Honours ==
Rapid București

- Divizia A: 1966–67
- Cupa României runner-up: 1960–61, 1961–62, 1967–68
- Balkans Cup: 1963–64, 1964–66
- Cupa Primăverii: 1957
