= Constantin Năsturescu =

Romanian footballer (1940–2021)

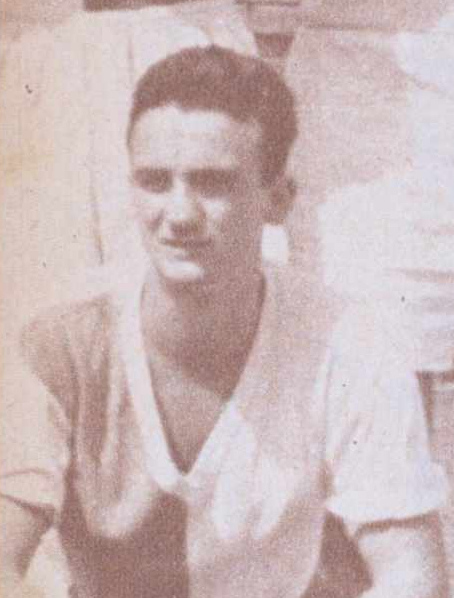
- Năsturescu with Rapid București in 1963.

Personal information
- Date of birth: 2 October 1940
- Place of birth: Giurgiu, Romania
- Date of death: 10 December 2021 (aged 81)
- Height: 1.67 m (5 ft 6 in)
- Position: Midfielder

Youth career
- Dunărea Giurgiu

Senior career*
| Years | Team | Apps | (Gls) |
| 1960–1961 | CFR Roșiori | | |
| 1962–1974 | Rapid București | 288 | (25) |
| 1974–1975 | Progresul Brăila | | |
| 1975–1976 | Unirea Focșani | | |

International career
| 1964–1969 | Romania (Note: Including three appearances for Romania's Olympic team) | 6 | (0) |
- * Club domestic league appearances and goals

Constantin Năsturescu (2 October 1940 – 10 December 2021) was a Romanian professional footballer who played as a midfielder.

== Club career ==
Năsturescu, nicknamed "Bebe", was born on 2 October 1940 in Giurgiu, Romania and began playing junior-level football in 1952 at local club Dunărea. He started his senior career in 1961 at CFR Roșiori in Divizia B.

He was transferred to Rapid București where on 8 April 1962 he made his Divizia A debut under coach Ion Mihăilescu in a 3–1 away loss to Steagul Roșu Brașov. Năsturescu spent 13 seasons at Rapid in which he helped the club win the 1966–67 Divizia A, their first title, being used by coach Valentin Stănescu in 25 matches, scoring three goals. In the following season he played four games in the 1967–68 European Cup, helping The Railwaymen eliminate Trakia Plovdiv and advance to the following round where they were eliminated by Juventus. Năsturescu also won two Balkans Cups in 1964 and 1966. Subsequently, he won the 1971–72 Cupa României where he was used the entire match by coach Bazil Marian in the 2–0 win over Jiul Petroșani in the final.

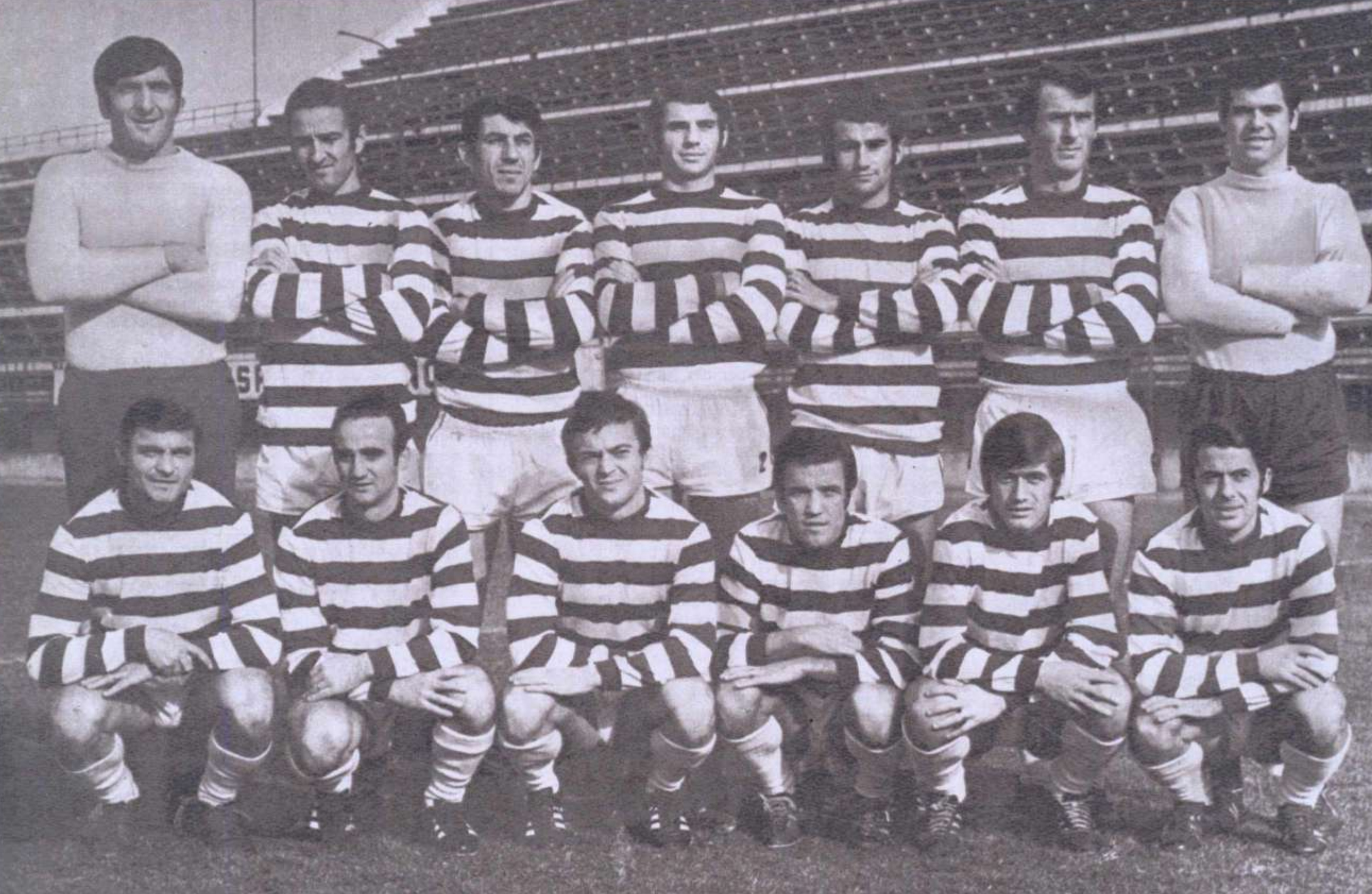
Năsturescu (front row, second from the left) with Rapid in 1970.

Năsturescu played a total of 20 games and scored two goals in European competitions (including four games and two goals in the Inter-cities Fairs Cup). He participated in all six matches of Rapid's 1971–72 UEFA Cup campaign as the team reached the round of 16 by eliminating Napoli and Legia Warsaw before falling to the eventual tournament winners, Tottenham. He also played in all six games during the 1972–73 European Cup Winners' Cup, helping the team reach the quarter-finals by defeating Landskrona BoIS and Rapid Wien prior to their elimination by the eventual finalists, Leeds United. Năsturescu made his last Divizia A appearance on 19 June 1974 in a 1–0 away loss to Politehnica Iași, totaling 288 matches with 25 goals in the competition, all for Rapid. He retired after playing two more seasons for Progresul Brăila and Unirea Focșani in Divizia B.

== International career ==
Năsturescu played three matches for Romania, making his debut under coach Bazil Marian on 4 January 1967 in a 1–1 friendly draw against Uruguay in Montevideo at Estadio Gran Parque Central. His following games were also friendlies, a 0–0 draw against Poland and a 1–0 loss to France. He also played three games for Romania's Olympic team.

== Death ==
Năsturescu died on 10 December 2021 at the age of 81.

== Honours ==
Rapid București

- Divizia A: 1966–67
- Cupa României: 1971–72
- Balkans Cup: 1963–64, 1964–66
