= Grigoriu =

Grigoriu is a Romanian surname. Notable people with the surname include:

- Grigore Grigoriu, Moldovan actor
- Grigore Grigoriu (footballer), Romanian football player
- Patrick Grigoriu, Romanian tennis player
- Paul Grigoriu, Romanian journalist, writer, and radio program director
- Simina Grigoriu, Romanian-Canadian DJ and music producer

== See also ==
- Grigoriu Ștefănescu (1836–1911), Romanian geologist, mineralogist. paleontologist
