= Teofil Codreanu =

Romanian footballer

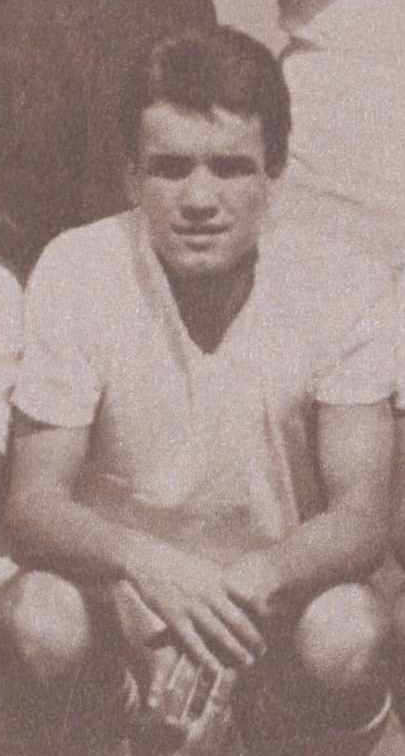
- Codreanu in 1965

Personal information
- Date of birth: 1 February 1941
- Place of birth: Bucharest, Romania
- Date of death: 10 January 2016 (aged 74)
- Place of death: Bucharest, Romania
- Height: 1.70 m (5 ft 7 in)
- Position: Attacking midfielder

Youth career
- 1956–1959: CCA București
- 1959–1961: Rapid București

Senior career*
Years	Team	Apps	(Gls)
1961–1973	Rapid București	258	(39)

International career
1962–1965	Romania U23	9	(0)
1964	Romania B	1	(0)
1964–1971	Romania Olympic	2	(0)
1965	Romania	1	(0)

Managerial career
- 1979–1981: Mecanică Fină București
- 1981–1983: Unirea Răcari
- 1983–1984: CSM Borzești
- 1984–1986: Metalul Rădăuți
- 1986: Rapid București
- * Club domestic league appearances and goals

Teofil Codreanu (1 February 1941 – 10 January 2016) was a Romanian professional footballer who played as an attacking midfielder.

== Club career ==
Codreanu, nicknamed Parpală, was born on 1 February 1941 in Bucharest, Romania and began playing junior-level football in 1956 at CCA București. In 1959, he went to play for Rapid București where on 18 March 1962 he made his Divizia A debut under coach Ion Mihăilescu in a 1–1 draw against Minerul Lupeni. Codreanu spent all 12 seasons of his career at Rapid, helping the club win the 1966–67 Divizia A, which was the first title in its history, being used by coach Valentin Stănescu in 23 matches in which he scored two goals. He also won the 1971–72 Cupa României, playing as a starter under coach Bazil Marian in the 2–0 win over Jiul Petroșani in the final.

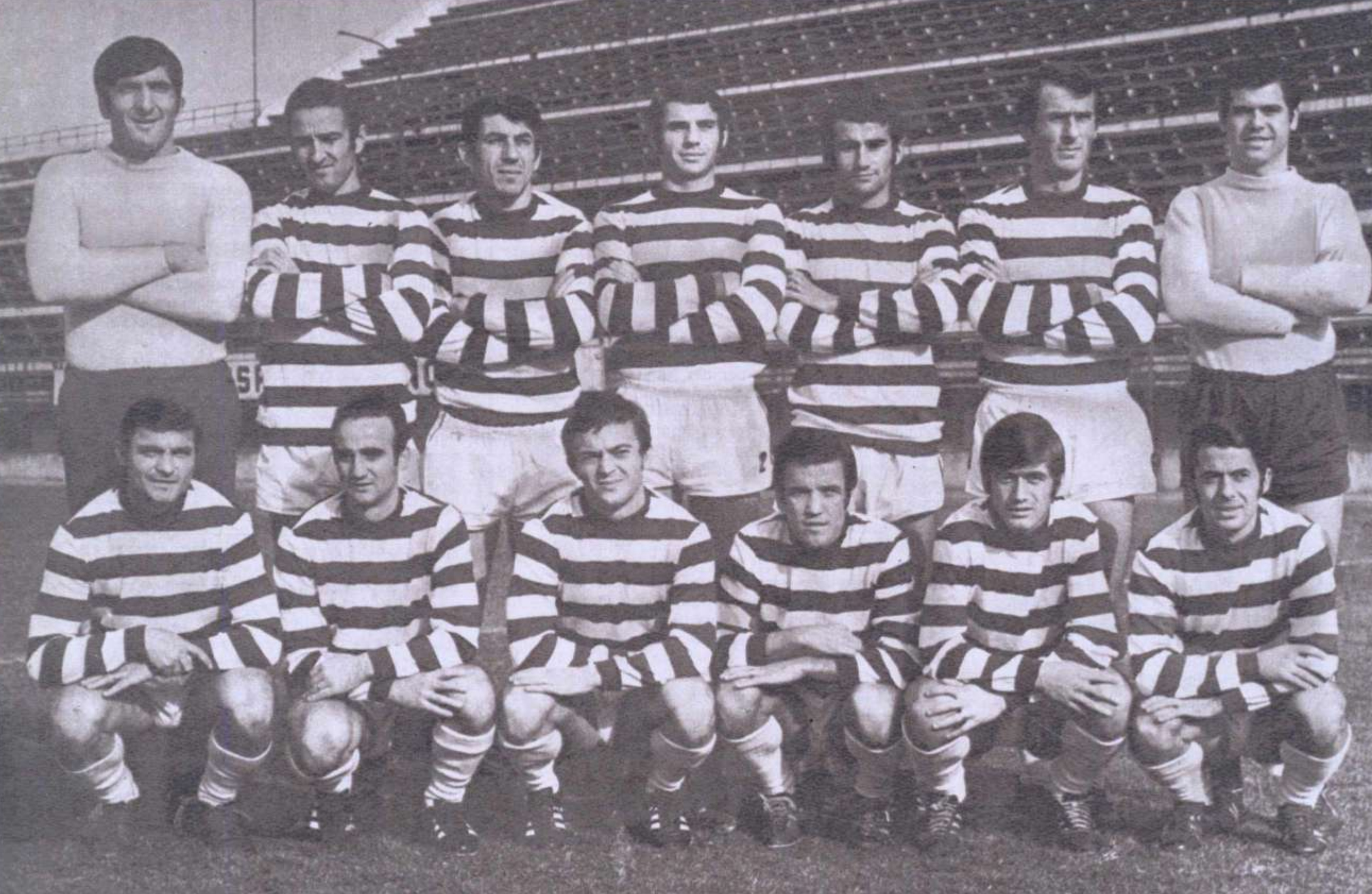
Codreanu (third from the right, bottom row) with Rapid in 1970.

Codreanu played 14 games and scored three goals in European competitions. He took part in the 1967–68 European Cup campaign in which he helped The Railwaymen get past Trakia Plovdiv in the first round by scoring a double in the second leg, being eliminated by Juventus in the following round. He appeared in five matches during the 1971–72 UEFA Cup, helping the club reach the round of 16 by eliminating Napoli and Legia Warsaw before they were defeated by the eventual champions, Tottenham. Subsequently, he played two games in the 1972–73 European Cup Winners' Cup, where the team advanced past Landskrona BoIS and Rapid Wien to reach the quarter-finals before being eliminated by the eventual runners-up, Leeds United. Codreanu made his last Divizia A appearance on 20 June 1973 in a 2–1 away loss to SC Bacău, totaling 258 appearances with 39 goals in the competition and 33 matches with seven goals in Cupa României.

== International career ==
From 1962 until 1971, Codreanu made several appearances for Romania's under-23, B and Olympic teams.

Codreanu made one appearance for Romania, playing on 23 October 1965 under coach Ilie Oană in a 2–1 away loss to Turkey in the 1966 World Cup qualifiers.

== Managerial career ==
Codreanu was also a manager who coached mostly in the Romanian lower leagues at Mecanică Fină București, Unirea Răcari, CSM Borzești and Metalul Rădăuți. He had only a single Divizia A experience which consisted of seven games at Rapid București, and also coached for many years at the team's youth academy.

== Death ==
He died on 10 January 2016, at the age of 74 in his native Bucharest.

== Honours ==
Rapid București

- Divizia A: 1966–67
- Cupa României: 1971–72

== See also ==
- List of one-club men in association football
