= Ionuț Curcă =

Romanian footballer

Personal information
- Full name: Ionuț Flavius Curcă
- Date of birth: 7 August 1977 (age 49)
- Place of birth: Bucharest, Romania
- Height: 1.80 m (5 ft 11 in)
- Position: Goalkeeper

Senior career*
Years	Team	Apps	(Gls)
1997–2000	Inter Gaz București		
2000–2001	Juventus București	23	(0)
2001–2006	Rapid București	9	(0)
2001–2006	→ Rapid II București (loan)	28	(0)
2006	Ceahlăul Piatra Neamț	12	(0)
2007	Jiul Petroșani	7	(0)
2007–2008	Prefab Modelu	13	(0)
Total		92	(0)
- * Club domestic league appearances and goals

Ionuț Flavius Curcă (born 7 August 1977) is a Romanian former football goalkeeper. In March 2006, he received the "Sports Merit" Medal, second class, with a bar, from the then President of Romania, Traian Băsescu, because he was part of Rapid's team that qualified for the 2005–06 UEFA Cup quarterfinals.

== Honours ==
Rapid București

- Divizia A: 2002–03
