= George Copos =

Romanian businessman and politician (born 1953)

- Born: Gheorghe Copos; March 27, 1953 (age 73); Tășnad, Satu Mare, Romania
- Education: University of Oradea; Ștefan Gheorghiu Academy
- Occupation: Businessman
- Known for: Owner of FC Rapid Bucharest

Gheorghe "George" Copos (Romanian pronunciation: [ˈdʒe̯ordʒe ˈkopos]; born March 27, 1953, in Tășnad, Satu Mare County) is a Romanian businessman and politician, mostly known for his ownership of the Rapid București football club.

Copos was vice-prime-minister between December 2004 and January 2006, and state minister in charge with coordination of the activities in the field of business environment and small and medium-sized enterprises in the Tăriceanu government.

== Early life ==
A graduate of the communist cadres' training school Ștefan Gheorghiu Academy, he was in his youth a leader of the Union of Communist Youth.

== Entrepreneurship ==
=== Business ===
Copos launched into business in 1990, immediately after the revolution, establishing his first company from the Ana group of companies. It is about Ana Co. confectionery. Over time, the group of companies in the Ana holding diversified: production, import and sale of electronic and household appliances, food industry, hotel industry, tourism, production of micro electric motors, road transport, cable transport, industrial maintenance, financial investments, port services or real estate. The Flora hotel in Bucharest (became Crowne Plaza in 1998), the Sport, Bradul and Poiana hotels in Poiana Brașov and the electric micro-motor factory in Pitești, which became Ana Imep, were bought. In 1999, the company Ana Teleferic was established, which owns and manages the cable transport facilities in Brașov and Poiana Brașov, as well as the ski area in Poiana Brașov. Also, the holding is represented on the social responsibility side by Fundația Ana, an organization concerned with charitable and humanitarian acts. Throughout the history of its activity, Ana Pan has gone through a reorganization of assets, expanding and diversifying its activity by building a factory that centralizes the company's entire production needs. Starting in 2001, Ana Hotels bought and modernized the Europa and Astoria hotels in Eforie Nord, as well as the Athenee Palace Hilton in Bucharest. Ana Hotels currently owns 6 hotels and 4 Spa centers.Throughout the 21 years of existence of the Ana Hotels company, Copos has coordinated massive investments in the modernization of all Ana hotels. Ana Teleferic inaugurated in 2005 the "Telegondola" in Poiana Brașov, a very modern facility that transports about 3000 people per hour, and in 2017 it modernized the Kanzel cable cars in Poiana Brașov and the one on Mount Tâmpa in Brașov. The Ana Tower project is currently in the works, an extensive real estate project for the construction of a 24-story office building, with 35,000 rentable square meters and estimated at over 40 million euros.He is the owner of a chain of confectionery shops, a chain of electronics shops, several hotels.

=== Ownership of Rapid Bucureşti ===
George Copos took over Rapid Bucureşti in 1992. Under his ownership, the Giulești team won the championship title twice, in 1998–99 and 2002–03 seasons, and the Romanian Cup 4 times. The period of major success begins with bringing in Mircea Lucescu as manager, in the summer of 1997. In the first year "Il Luce" won the Cup, and in the second the championship.

== Political career ==
Copos was a member of the Conservative Party and between December 2004 and January 2006, he was a vice-prime-minister and State Minister in charge with coordination of the activities in the field of business environment and small and medium-sized enterprises in the Tăriceanu government. On January 21, 2006, he resigned from the Conservative Party amid a corruption scandal. He maintained, however, his function as vice prime-minister and State Minister in the government. He also resigned from the government in June 2006, maintaining his function as a senator.

== Conviction ==
On March 4, 2014 a Romanian appeals court sentenced him to 3 years and 8 months in prison for fraud, tax evasion and money laundering in connection with Rapid Bucureşti football player transfers; he was also ordered to repay the equivalent of US$690,000 to the football club and the Romanian state.

On March 26, 2014 a Romanian court sentenced him to 4 years in prison for fraud, in a case regarding the sale of several commercial venues to the Romanian State Lottery.

In 2015 Geopge Copos was released after serving 1/3 of the 4-year prison sentence with execution to which he was sentenced.

== See also ==
- List of corruption scandals in Romania

Preceded by Ministry of Transport	Owner of Rapid Bucuresti; 1992–2013	Succeeded by Adrian Zamfir
