= FC Rapid București =

Association football club in Bucharest

Rapid București
- Full name: Fotbal Club Rapid SA
- Nicknames: Rapidiștii; Giuleștenii (The people of Giulești); Alb-vișiniii (The White-Burgundies); Feroviarii (The Railwaymen); Echipa de sub Podul Grant (The Team below Grant Bridge)
- Short name: Rapid
- Founded: 25 June 1923; 103 years ago as CFR București; 2016; 10 years ago (refounded) as Mișcarea Feroviară CFR București
- Ground: Rapid-Giulești
- Capacity: 14,048
- Owners: Dan Șucu (92.5%); Victor Angelescu (7.5%)
- Chairman: Victor Angelescu
- Head coach: Daniel Pancu
- League: Liga I
- 2025–26: Liga I, 5th of 16
- Website: www.fcrapid.ro
Home colours	Away colours	Third colours

Fotbal Club Rapid, commonly known as Rapid București (Romanian pronunciation: [raˈpid bukuˈreʃtʲ]) or simply as Rapid, is a Romanian professional football club based in Bucharest that competes in the Liga I, the top tier of the Romanian league system. It was established in 1923 by employees of the Grivița railway workshops, under the name Asociația Culturală și Sportivă CFR ("CFR Cultural and Sports Association").

During its first half-century, Rapid București regularly contended for the league title, finishing as runners-up nine times before winning its first national championship in the 1966–67 season. After a period of fluctuating fortunes that included spells in the second division, Rapid claimed further league titles in the 1998–99 and 2002–03 seasons. A 2016 bankruptcy and dissolution led to the club being refounded, but it advanced through the lower leagues to return to the Liga I in 2021. Its domestic honours also include 13 Cupa României titles and four Supercupa României titles, making it the third-most decorated club in the country.

In European competitions, Rapid reached the quarter-finals of the 1972–73 European Cup Winners' Cup and the 2005–06 UEFA Cup. The club also reached the final of the 1940 Mitropa Cup, which was not played due to the escalation of World War II.

Since 1939, Rapid has traditionally played in burgundy and white kits. Its home ground was the Valentin Stănescu Stadium until its replacement by the Rapid-Giulești Stadium in 2022. The club has longstanding local rivalries with FCSB, Dinamo București, and CSA Steaua București; however its oldest rivalry is with Petrolul Ploiești, with which it contests the Primvs derby.

== History ==
=== 1923–32: Beginnings ===
On 25 June 1923, in a classroom of the primary school from the Grivița neighborhood, Bucharest, the employees of the Grivița workshops created Asociația Culturală și Sportivă CFR ("CFR Cultural and Sports Association"). Teofil Copaci was chosen as the president of the association, while Grigore Grigoriu became the first captain of the team. The squad was formed in September, following the merger of the Ateliere and Excelsior teams. The first equipment was made out of burgundy fabric in the house of Grigoriu.

On 28 October 1923, the team played its first game against Unirea Timișoara, which it lost 4–8. The second match, played over ten days, was against Gloria Arad, and was lost 1–2. Until 1932 CFR played in the Bucharest Championship, not qualifying in the final tournament of the national league. During this period, the leaders of the team were: Teofil Copaci, Grigore Grigoriu, and Bozie Codreanu; other players included Stănică, Tudor, Molnar, Ștefănescu, Foran, Leoveanu, Constantinescu, Fetzko, Georgescu, Albert, Block, Filip, Itu I, Itu II, Pîrvulescu, Cichi, Schileriu, Svetcovschi, Oros, Ujlaki, Pop, Dobrescu I, Kelemen, Vlaiculescu, Ispas, Vintilescu, and Petrovici.

=== 1932–45: The golden years ===
The club entered the Divizia A at the start of the 1932–33 season, after several years of competing for the regional championship of Bucharest. During the pre-war years, Rapid was one of Romania's top teams, regularly winning the cup, but never the championship, although they came close. Once Rapid lost the title because of a player's candor. One of Rapid's players touched the ball with his hand in the penalty area during a decisive match against Venus București, when Rapid needed a win to finish first in the league. At first, the referee didn't see it, but when he heard the audience protesting asked the player if he had touched the ball with his hand. The player admitted that he had.

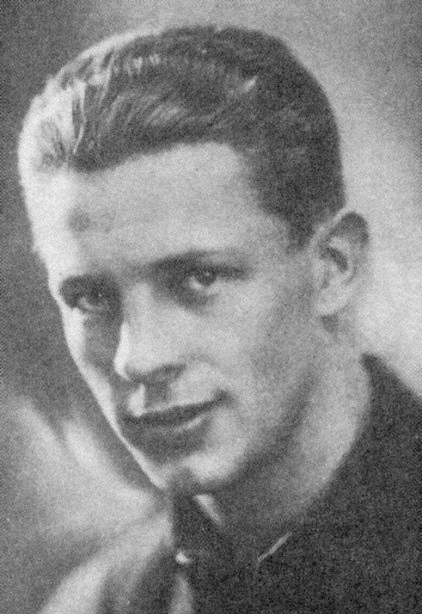
Iuliu Baratky, "The Blonde Wonder of Giulești"

Chronology of names
Period	Name
1923–1937	CFR București
1937–1945	Rapid București
1945–1950	CFR București
1950–1958	Locomotiva București
1958–2016	Rapid București
2016–2017	Mișcarea Feroviară CFR București
2017–2018	Academia Rapid București
2018–2019	Fotbal Club R București
2019–present	Fotbal Club Rapid 1923

Venus converted the penalty kick and managed a 1–1 draw to finish first in the league, instead of "the Railwaymen". The team's final season's standings in the Divizia A were: 1932–33 – 2nd (Seria I), 1933–34 – 4th (Seria I), 1934–35 – 10th, 1935–36 – 7th, 1936–37 – 2nd, 1937–38 – 1st (Seria I) (with the team losing the national championship final against Ripensia Timișoara 0–2), 1938–39 – 6th, 1939–40 – 2nd, and 1940–41 – 2nd.

In this period, the club's most successful time in this competition, Rapid won seven Romanian Cups: 1934–35, 1936–37, 1937–38, 1938–39, 1939–40, 1940–41, 1941–42, six of them won in consecutive years. The players in this winning effort included Roșculeț, Ujlaki, Vintilă, Wetzer II, Rășinaru, Cuedan, Barbu II, Rădulescu, Bogdan, Auer, Moldoveanu, Baratky, Raffinsky, Lengheriu, I.Costea, Sipos, Gavrilescu, Sadowski, Silvăț, Ghiurițan, Wetzer III, and Florian.

In the summer of 1937, the club changed its name from CFR București to Rapid București, modeling their new name on that of the Austrian club Rapid Wien.

The "railway workers" were no longer topping the league standings, but they still had supportive fans, and some players were selected for the national team. During those years, the competition format changed after various reorganizations, and Rapid won the Bessarabia Cup in 1942. They qualified for the final of the Mitropa Cup (precursor of the UEFA Champions League). In 1940, Rapid played to two ties in the Mitropa Cup semi-finals and was drawn for the final, which was never played, due to the outbreak of World War II.

=== 1945–1970: The Railwaymen, a solid team ===
After the war, Rapid returned to the Bucharest Championship in the 1945–46 season, finally finishing 4th. After this season the club returned to its old name, CFR (Căile Ferate Române – Romanian Railways), and entered the 1946–47 Divizia A season, the first official national season after the end of the war, and ended in 5th place, two points away from 2nd place (Carmen București) and 13 from 1st place (ITA Arad). In the following season, 1947–48, the team finished 3rd, behind CFR Timișoara and ITA Arad. In the 1948–49 season, "the White and Burgundies" finished 2nd, only five points behind IC Oradea. Also, on 20 March 1949, CFR București obtained the most lopsided victory in its entire history, 12–2 against CFR Cluj.

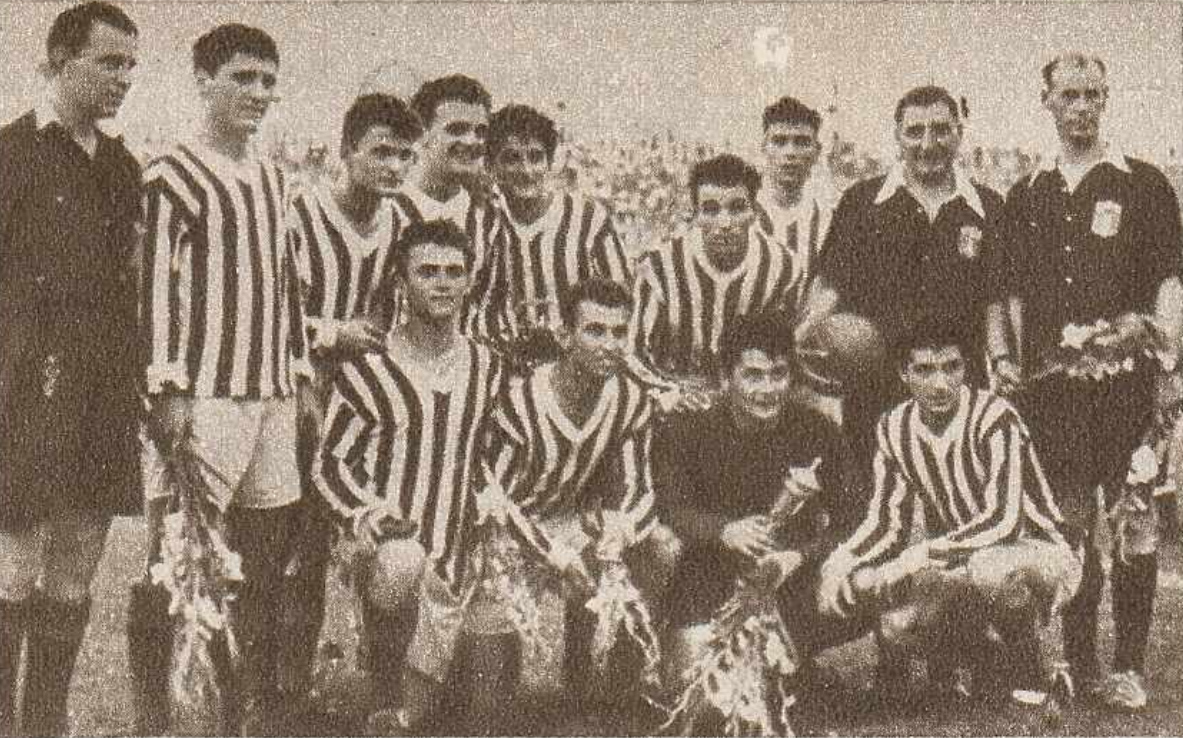
The club played under the name Locomotiva in 1957.

Under the influence of the communist regime installed in the country after 1945, the 1950s started with a change from an autumn-spring season to a spring-autumn one. In the 1950 season Rapid became Locomotiva, a name much closer to the Soviet version, Lokomotiv, a change imposed on all the teams that belonged to the Romanian Railways, but the Giuleștenii finished again in 2nd place. The first relegation to Liga II came in 1951 when the club was ranked 11th, losing a three-way contest by a goal against Locomotiva Târgu Mureș and Știința Timișoara. Promoted one year later, from 1st place in Liga II, with 10 points over the second-ranked (Locomotiva Iași), Rapid would finish the 1953 season in 5th place. In 1954 season Locomotiva, in 12th place, was relegated for the second time. However, "The White and Burgundies" returned after only one year to Divizia A, following a good showing for the team, including a 4th-place ranking at the end of 1956, only 5 points behind 1st place (CCA București).

In the 1957–58 season, Romanian football returned to the autumn-spring system and "the Railwaymen" finished at the middle of the table, 8th out of 12. The end of the Soviet system also meant the end of Soviet team names, and in 1958 the team returned to the Austrian-inspired name of Rapid. In the following years, the team finished 4th and 10th at the end of the 1958–59 and 1959–60 seasons, respectively.

In the 1950s, the squad included the following players: Valentin Stănescu, Gheorghe Dungu, Gh. Demeter, Dumitru Macri, Ion Mihăilescu, C. Simionescu, N. Cristescu, I. Ruzici, C. Socec, Ion Lungu, Bazil Marian, Andrei Rădulescu, Anton Fernbach-Ferenczi, Ștefan Filotti, Nicolae Roman, E. Avasilchioaie, D. Călin, L. Coman, A. Todor, N. Dodeanu, I. Langa, I. Olaru, Stere Zeană, and Gh. Milea, among others.

The 1960s was one of the best periods for Giulești football. In 1961, Rapid reached the final of the Romanian Cup, where they lost to Arieșul Turda, 1–2, with Nicolae Georgescu scoring in the 24th minute for the "White and Burgundy". The result was more surprising, as the winning team was, at that time, only a Divizia C member. The following season, Rapid—with a squad coached by Ion Mihăilescu and composed of valuable players such as Ilie Greavu, Ion Motroc, Dumitru Macri, Titus Ozon, Ion Ionescu or Teofil Codreanu, among others—eliminated CSM Mediaș, Laminorul Roman, Metalul Târgoviște, and Progresul București. However, they suffered a dramatic defeat in the final, 1–5, against a Steaua București squad that would come to be recognized as the golden generation of that club.

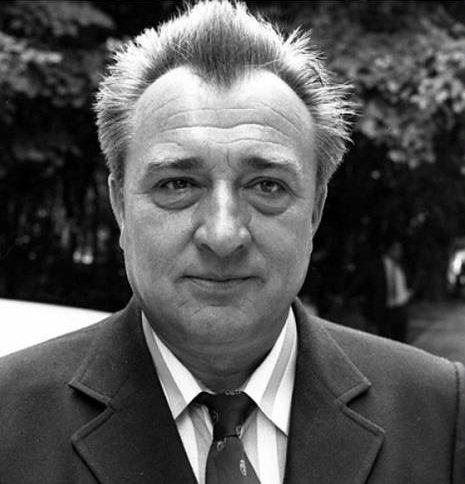
Valentin Stănescu, a former player and the coach that won the title with Rapid in 1967

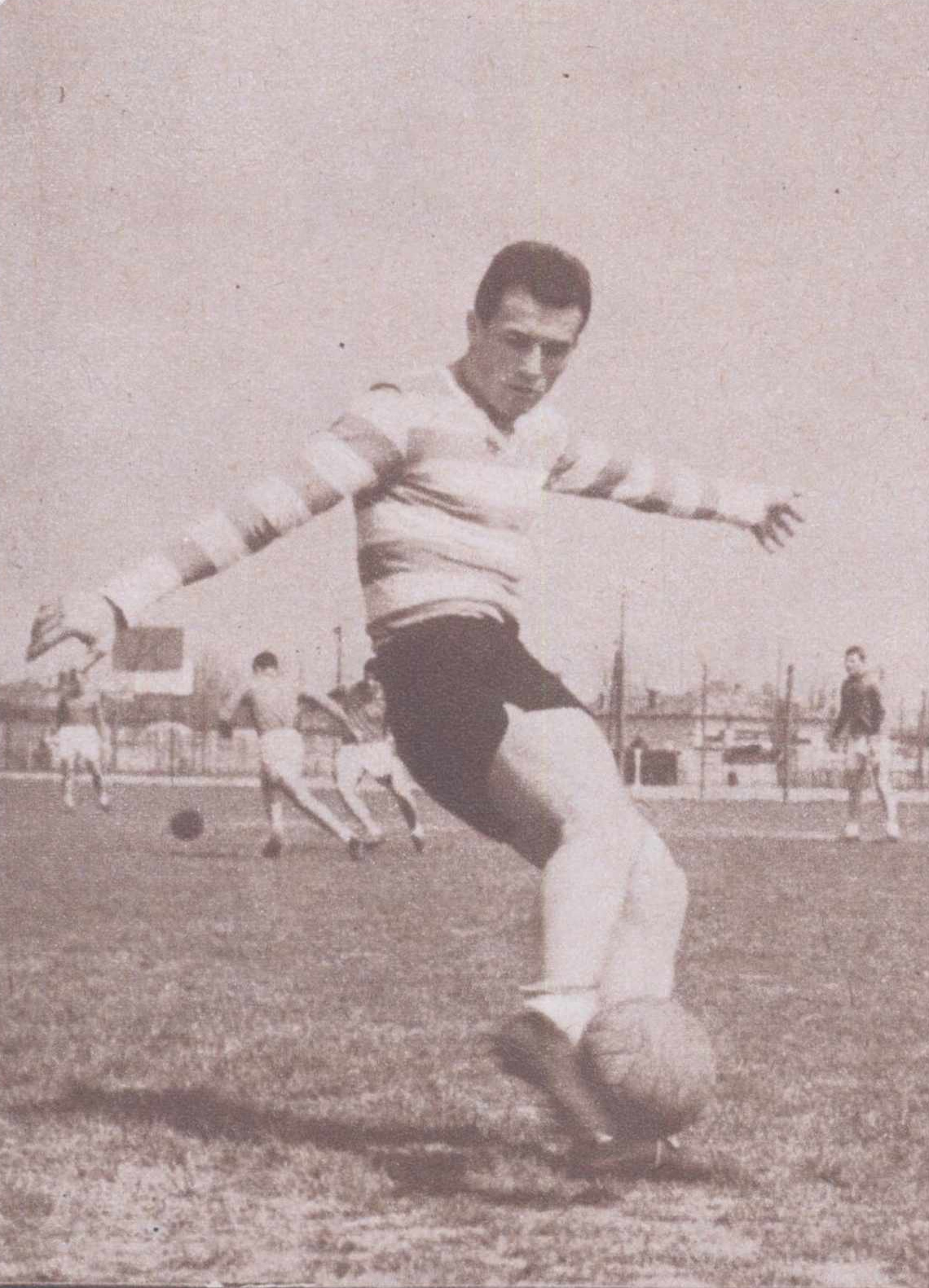
Dan Coe, the captain of the squad that won the first title

For most of these seasons, the team could be found in the top half of the league: 1960–61 – 3rd, 1961–62 – 5th, and 1962–63 – 8th. Then followed three great seasons for the squad, under the Grant Bridge, which finished 2nd three years in a row: 1963–64 (7 points behind Dinamo București), 1964–65 (1 point behind Dinamo București), and 1965–66 (6 points behind Petrolul Ploiești). Nevertheless, they finished behind their rivals Dinamo and Petrolul. This motivated "the Railwaymen", who, at the end of the 1966–67 season, had their best performance up until that time, their first Divizia A title, with the following players: Răducanu Necula, Marin Andrei – Dan Coe, Nicolae Lupescu, Ion Motroc, Ilie Greavu, Constantin Jamaischi – Constantin Dinu-Buric, Nicolae Georgescu, Constantin Năsturescu, Teofil Codreanu, Viorel Kraus – Ion Ionescu, Emil Dumitriu, and Alexandru Neagu. Valentin Stănescu and Victor Stănculescu were their coaches. In that season the title was won by two points over Dinamo București and the season's top scorer was Ion Ionescu, with 15 goals.

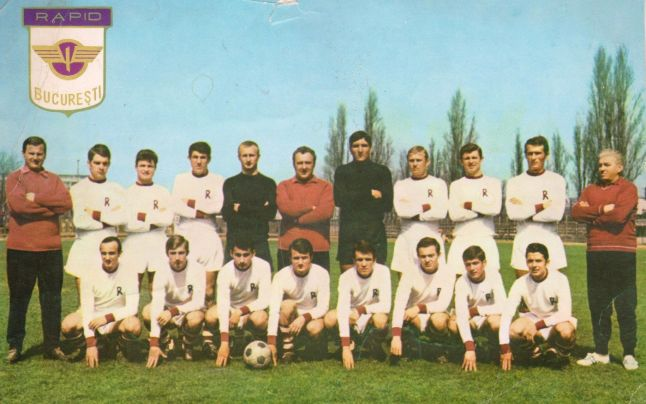
Rapid's first league winning team in 1967

In the 1967–68 European Cup, Rapid eliminated the Bulgarian champion, Botev Plovdiv, in the first round, but lost to Juventus, 0–1. In the 1967–68 Division A season the team reached the final game of the Romanian Cup, which it lost to Dinamo, 1–3 in overtime; placed 3rd in 1968–69; and 2nd in 1969–70.

=== 1970–1990: Troubled times ===
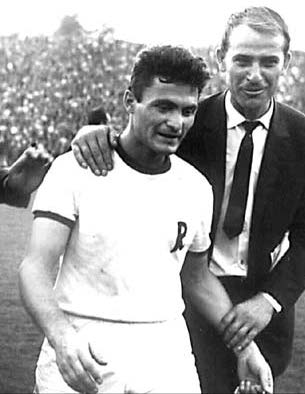
Ilie Greavu spent the majority of his career at Rapid, joining in 1957 and retiring in 1971.

Rapid's last strong season was in 1970–71, when it finished in 2nd place, after which it started to slide towards the bottom half of the league table: 1971–72 – 10th and 1972–73 – 14th. Despite these lesser performances, in 1972 Rapid reached the Romanian Cup final under coach Bazil Marian, a team player in the 1950s, and won 2–0 against Jiul Petroșani, with goals scored by Stelian Marin (3rd minute) and Alexandru Neagu (27th minute). In the 1971–72 UEFA Cup season Rapid had impressive results, eliminating Napoli and Legia Warsaw before being stopped by Tottenham Hotspur, 0–5. In the 1972–73 European Cup Winners' Cup, Rapid won 3–1 against Landskrona BoIS of Sweden and 4–2 against Rapid Wien, but were eliminated by Leeds United of England with an 8–1 aggregate.

At the end of the 1973–74 season, the "White and Burgundies" finished 16th, with the same number of points as Jiul Petroșani, but this time the club from the Jiu Valley would win because of higher scores. Rapid was relegated for the third time in its history, only 7 years since its first national title. The squad had a strong following season and was promoted after only one year spent in the second league, finishing 1st in the 2nd series, 6 points ahead of 2nd place Progresul București. "The Railwaymen" seemed to want to convince everyone that relegation was nothing but a regrettable error; so, they also won the Romanian Cup in the same season, surprisingly, being a second echelon team. In the 1974–75 Cupa României campaign, Rapid advanced by eliminating strong teams such as Dinamo București (2–1), Jiul Petroșani (1–0), Ceahlăul Piatra Neamț (1–0), and Steaua București (1–1, 6–5 on penalties). In the final they encountered Universitatea Craiova, the Divizia A defending champions, a club that was fielding its first golden generation (known as "The Champion of a Great Love"), led from the pitch by its legend, Ion Oblemenco. Rapid won 2–1, in extra time, with goals scored by Nicolae Manea, and Ion Oblemenco scoring for Craiova.

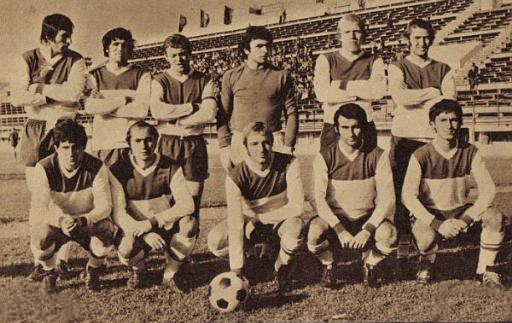
Rapid București, the second league team that won the 1974–75 Romanian Cup

Back in Divizia A, Rapid had two mediocre seasons: 1975–76 – 14th and 1976–77 – 16th, being relegated again, 10 years since being champions of Romania. After this relegation began one of the darkest periods in the history of the club at their stadium near Grant Bridge, with 6 consecutive Divizia B seasons: 1977–78 – 4th, 1978–79 – 6th, 1979–80 – 2nd, 1980–81 – 3rd, 1981–82 – 2nd and 1982–83 – 1st. This period led to a fierce rivalry with Petrolul Ploiești and Progresul București. A 1980 match, against Progresul, saw a record attendance, for a Divizia B match, of over 50,000 spectators. The subsequent return to the first division was due to coaches Valentin Stănescu (who also brought the first title in 1967) and Viorel Kraus. The players were Ion Gabriel, Manu, Popescu, Paraschiv, Pirvu, Șișcă, Tiță, Iancu, Cojocaru, Ion Ion, Nicolae Manea, Ad. Dumitru, Petruț, Ispas, C. Dumitriu, Avram, Marian Damaschin, Marta, Lazăr, Koti, Săftoiu, A. Mincu, and Petre Petre.

Rapid then had a disappointing record in Divizia A: 1984–85 – 11th, 1985–86 – 8th, 1986–87 – 14th, 1987–88 – 13th, and 1988–89 – 17th. In these five seasons "the Railwaymen" recorded the biggest loss in the history of the club, 0–9 against Corvinul Hunedoara (14 August 1985), as well as the biggest loss in Giulești Stadium, 2–8 against Steaua București (3 May 1989). After these poor performances, the 1988–89 Cupa României season saw the "White and Burgundies" gaining the semi-finals of the competition, when they were eliminated by Steaua București, 2–3, with a decisive goal scored in the last minute. The team was relegated to Divizia B for the fifth time. The Giuleștenii then had a good season in the 2nd series of the second league—finishing 1st with 22 victories, 5 draws, 7 defeats, 61 goals scored and 32 conceded, 49 points, 4 more than the second place (Drobeta-Turnu Severin) and 11 more than the third place (Unirea Alba Iulia)—and were again promoted.

=== 1990–2008: A glorious period ===
Promoted back to the top league, in the next season Rapid finished 11th, 4 points away from the relegation zone. What followed was two seasons of progress in which "the Railwaymen" finished 7th, then 4th. In 1993, the club was bought by George Copos and began probably one of the most fruitful periods in the history of "the White and Burgundies".

After the 4th-place finish at the end of the 1993 season, Rapid returned to the European Cups after 18 years of absence, but was eliminated in the first round by the Italian side Inter Milan, 1–5 on aggregate. In 1994, the club finished 4th again in Divizia A, but no one risked a prognosis for a team whose fortunes so oscillated. The 1994–95 UEFA Cup season again brought two tough opponents for the Giulești side: Charleroi of Belgium, which they eliminated 3–2 on aggregate, and Eintracht Frankfurt, which eliminated Rapid 2–6 on aggregate, especially due to the 0–5 defeat by Waldstadion. In the Divizia A, they again finished in 4th place, but this time with no qualification for the European Competitions.

In the 1995–96 season the team finished 3rd, qualifying again for the UEFA Cup. After a 2–0 victory on aggregate against Lokomotiv Sofia, "the Railwaymen" were eliminated by Karlsruher SC, 2–4 on aggregate, the second time a German side eliminated them. The squad finished 8th at the end of the 1996–97 season.

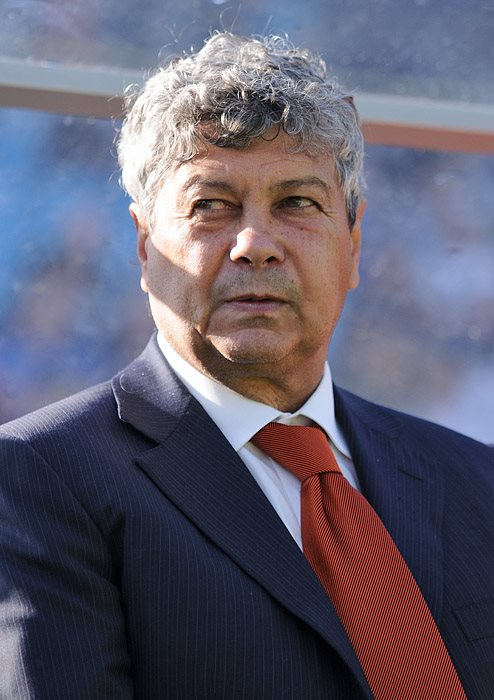
Mircea Lucescu (pictured) and his son, Răzvan, served several times as Rapid managers between 1997 and 2012, winning, respectively, three and two domestic trophies.

With Mircea Lucescu as the new coach, Rapid had a very good 1997–98 season, the best one in the last 22 seasons. In the championship, the team finished 2nd, only two points behind Steaua București, missing the chance of a title, the first one since 1967. In the last match of the season, with over 20,000 fans travelling from Bucharest, Rapid only managed a 2–2 draw against Universitatea Craiova, a result which was heavily contested after Rapid had a clear goal denied by the referee. Without title, Rapid focused on the Romanian Cup, where they won their 10th title, but the first one since 1975. In the final, they again met Craiova, with Lucian Marinescu's 67th-minute goal securing the trophy. This triumph returned the team back to the UEFA Competitions, this time the 1998–99 UEFA Cup Winners' Cup. The 1998–99 season started off badly. After an 8–2 on aggregate win against Grevenmacher in the qualifying round, Rapid was again eliminated quickly, this time in the first round by Vålerenga, with a 2–2 on aggregate and 2 goals scored in the Giulești Stadium by the Norwegian club. In the championship, Rapid had one of the best seasons in the history of Divizia A, finishing 1st with 89 points and winning the much-desired title of champion of Romania, the 2nd one in the history of the club. This performance was obtained under coaches Mircea Lucescu (24 rounds), Nicolae Manea (5 rounds), Dumitru Dumitriu (4 rounds), and Mircea Rednic (1 round), with the following players: Marius Bratu, Bogdan Lobonț – Daniel Chiriță, Adrian Iencsi, Dorel Mutică, Ștefan Nanu, Vasile Popa, Răzvan Raț, Mircea Rednic, Nicolae Stanciu (C), Ion Voicu – Bogdan Andone, Constantin Barbu, Mugur Bolohan, Zeno Bundea, Dănuț Lupu, Ovidiu Maier, Marius Măldărășanu, Ioan Sabău, Cezar Zamfir – Ionel Ganea, Radu Niculescu, Daniel Pancu, Sergiu Radu, and Marius Șumudică. The team also included Cristian Dulca, Lucian Marinescu, and Stefan Nanu, who left during the winter break.

The 1999–2000 season was again a good one for Rapid. However, despite the fact that they were in 2nd place, with 15-point over 3rd place (Steaua București), they could not equal the nearly perfect season of Dinamo București, who ended in 1st place, by 12 points. Rapid also could not retain the Romanian championship, being eliminated in the semi-finals by FC U Craiova, 2–3 on aggregate. The UEFA Champions League was a great disappointment, the team being eliminated by the Latvian side Skonto, 4–5 on aggregate.

The 2000–01 season started with Anghel Iordănescu as the new coach and finished with Mircea Rednic at the helm. Post-season competition consisted of a 3–1 victory over Mika of Armenia, in the qualifying round, and a 0–1 loss to Liverpool, in the first round, which resulted in a 4th place in the European championship and a quarter-finals elimination in the Romanian Cup, after a 1–2 loss to Dinamo. The next season, with Viorel Hizo as the new coach, Rapid made another good run and finished 3rd in the league, and lasted two-rounds in the 2001–02 UEFA Cup: a lopsided 12–0 on aggregate victory over Atlantas, followed by an unexpected 0–0 tie, at Parc des Princes, against PSG, losing in the second round 0–1, by a goal by Aloísio in the 93rd minute. Finally, the match was called 0–3 after the floodlight system shut down. On the other hand, "the Railwaymen" won their 11th Romanian Cup, after a final in which they registered a 2–1 victory against Dinamo București, with goals scored by Marius Măldărășanu and Daniel Pancu, and with Mircea Rednic as the new coach.

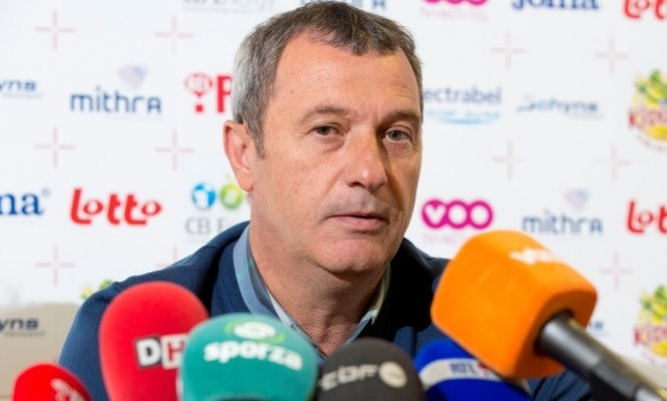
Mircea Rednic, the coach that won the title with Rapid in 2003, also a former player of the club.

The 2002–03 season saw the club win its third league title, finishing 1st with by 7 points over Steaua București The team lasted the usual two rounds in the UEFA Cup: 5–1 against Gorica and 1–2 against Vitesse, being eliminated, by penalties, by FC Argeș, in the second round of the Romanian Cup. The squad was coached by Mircea Rednic and was composed of the following players: Ionuț Curcă, Emilian Dolha, Răzvan Lucescu, Boban Savič – Nicolae Constantin, Adrian Iencsi, Vasile Maftei, Dănuț Perjă, Răzvan Raț, Florin Șoavă, Ion Voicu – Valentin Bădoi, Roberto Bisconti, Emmanuel Godfroid, Nicolae Grigore, Róbert Ilyés, Ioan Sabău – Florin Bratu, Daniel Niculae and Robert Niță.

The 2003–04 season was below expectations. Starting under coach Mircea Rednic, continued with Dan Petrescu, and ending under Viorel Hizo, Rapid finished 3rd, 15 points out of 1st place, which was held by Dinamo București. In the UEFA Champions League, the Rapidiștii met Anderlecht in a 0–0 tie, in the Valentin Stănescu Stadium, followed by a 2–3 defeat, in Constant Vanden Stock Stadium, after Rapid had led 2–0; and the team was again eliminated in the first rounds of the competition. The 2004–05 season started with a new coach, Răzvan Lucescu, and "the White and Burgundies" finished again in 3rd place, six points out of 1st place. In the Romanian Cup they were eliminated in the first round by the Divizia B side Dacia Unirea Brăila, 0–1.

The 3rd place in the league qualified the club for the 2005–06 UEFA Cup season. Rapid had the best European season in the history of the club, starting from the first round of the competition, qualifying for the first time for the group stage, and only being eliminated in the quarter-finals. The team's run was the following: 10–0 on aggregate against Sant Julià from Andorra, 4–1 against Vardar, and an unexpected 2–1 on aggregate against Feyenoord, and qualifying for the group stage. They were assigned to Group G, where they gained 3 victories: Rennes (2–0), Shakhtar Donetsk (1–0), PAOK (1–0), while losing only one match, against Stuttgart (1–2). If in the past Rapid was eliminated by German clubs such as Karlsruher SC or Eintracht Frankfurt, now the team was transformed in a real "killer" against the German sides, after a 3–0 victory against Hertha in the Round of 32 and a 3–3 tie, with an away goal scored against Hamburg. "The Burgundy Eagles" were stopped only in the quarter-finals by another Romanian side, FCSB, 1–1 on aggregate, with a goal scored by FCSB in Giulești. This was one of the most memorable seasons in the history of Rapid, FCSB, and Romanian football. Rapid also lost the Romanian title to FCSB, but won the Romanian Cup, after a 1–0 victory over Dinamo București. The squad in the 2005–06 European campaign was coached by Răzvan Lucescu and included the following players: Dănuț Coman, Ionuț Curcă, Apoula Edel, Mihai Mincă – Marius Constantin, Nicolae Constantin, Vasile Maftei, Dănuț Perjă, Marius Postolache, Ionuț Rada, Adrian Rusu, Ionuț Stancu – Valentin Bădoi, Emil Dică, Gigel Ene, Nicolae Grigore, Artavazd Karamyan, Marius Măldărășanu, Valentin Negru, Romeo Stancu – Mugurel Buga, Lucian Burdujan, Viorel Moldovan, Daniel Niculae, Daniel Pancu, and Ciprian Vasilache.

In the following two seasons, Rapid ended in 4th (2006–07) and 3rd (2007–08) places, with another Romanian Cup title in 2007, in a final won 2–0 against Politehnica Timișoara in Dan Păltinișanu Stadium. In the UEFA Cup, they were constant participations, with another group-stage presence in the 2006–07 season, but finishing 4th, in a group with PSG, Mladá Boleslav, Hapoel Tel Aviv, and Panathinaikos, missing qualifying for the semi-finals. The next season saw a first-round elimination, to FC Nürnberg.

=== 2008–2016: Rapid "in derailment" ===
After the 2007–08 season, the financial situation of Rapid was complicated, partly by the criminal conviction of the owner, George Copos, on charges of tax evasion, illegal transfers, and misuse of the lottery. The team performances also declined. After finishing 3rd in 2007–08, Rapid occupied mid-level places three times over the next five years: 2008–09 – 8th, 2009–10 – 7th and 2012–13 – 9th. Still, the team had a last burst of success in the 2010–11 and 2011–12 seasons, when, under coaches Marius Șumudică, Marian Rada, and Răzvan Lucescu, they achieved two consecutive 4th-place rankings, with a new presence in the UEFA Europa League. They finished the 2011–12 UEFA Europa League season in the group stage, after they eliminated Polish side Śląsk Wrocław in the play-off round, making only 3 points in a group with Hapoel Tel Aviv, PSV Eindhoven, and Legia Warsaw occupying last place. Next season was slightly weaker, with Rapid eliminated in the third qualifying round, after a two-legged match against Heerenveen, previously having eliminated the Finnish club MYPA, 5–1 on aggregate.

On 10 May 2013, the Disciplinary Commission of the Romanian Football Federation decided not to grant the Liga I license to the club for the 2013–14 season. At the end of the season the club was sold by George Copos to Nicolae Cristescu and Adrian Zamfir.

On 6 July the FRF Executive Committee decided that 18 teams would participate in the first league. Mircea Sandu announced that a play-off between Concordia Chiajna (which relegated on the pitch) and Rapid (which was relegated on legal terms) would be held to decide the 18th team. This match took place on 13 July 2013 in Dinamo Stadium and was won by "the Railwaymen" 2–1. Concordia challenged the legality of this play-off match, as Rapid had no license for Liga I. After two rounds had already been played, on 2 August 2013 the Court of Arbitration for Sport (CAS) decided that the organization of the play-off match was irregular and Concordia must remain in the top league, Rapid being relegated.

Relegated for the sixth time to the second league, and after a period of 23 years spent in the top league with excellent performances, Rapid gathered all its forces, despite a poor financial situation and an under-funding from the new owners. Under coach Viorel Moldovan, former player on the team, "the Burgundy Eagles" had a good season, finishing 2nd in the regular season, as well as in the play-off round of the 2013–14 season, right behind Politehnica Iași and two points above Unirea Slobozia, ensuring their promotion to the first league. On 17 May 2014, the Licensing Commission of the Romanian Football Federation again decided not to grant the necessary license, this time for the 2014–15 season of Liga I. Rapid decided to appeal to the Court of Arbitration for Sport, but could not initially afford the €30,000, trial fee. The money for the fee was eventually donated by club supporters, and CAS admitted the appeal, forcing the Romanian Football Federation to grant Rapid a license for the Liga I season.

In the meantime, the club was bought by Valerii Moraru, a Moldovan businessman; but under coaches Ionel Ganea, Marian Rada, Cristian Pustai, and Cristiano Bergodi, the team had a very weak season, finishing only 16th, out of 18, and being relegated back to Liga II, for the seventh time.

Back in Liga II, with Dan Alexa as a coach, Rapid had a solid season, despite the fact that debts suffocated the club; and the under-funding by the new owner did not help. At the end of the 2015–16 season, Rapid was promoted, being in 1st place, three points ahead of Dunărea Călărași. However, the club did not recover financially; the team kept only a few players and no coaches. After filing for bankruptcy, FC Rapid could not sign any new contracts, so it could not build a team for the 2016–17 season. Finally, on 14 December 2016, Rapid was officially declared bankrupt, after a half-season of inactivity.

=== 2016–present: Rebirth ===
Chart showing the progress of Rapid's league finishes from 1932 until present.

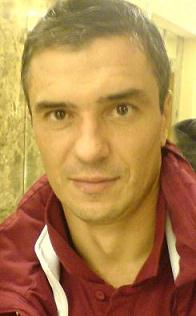
Daniel Pancu, a symbol of modern Rapid and the technical director of the club, after its 2017 refounding.

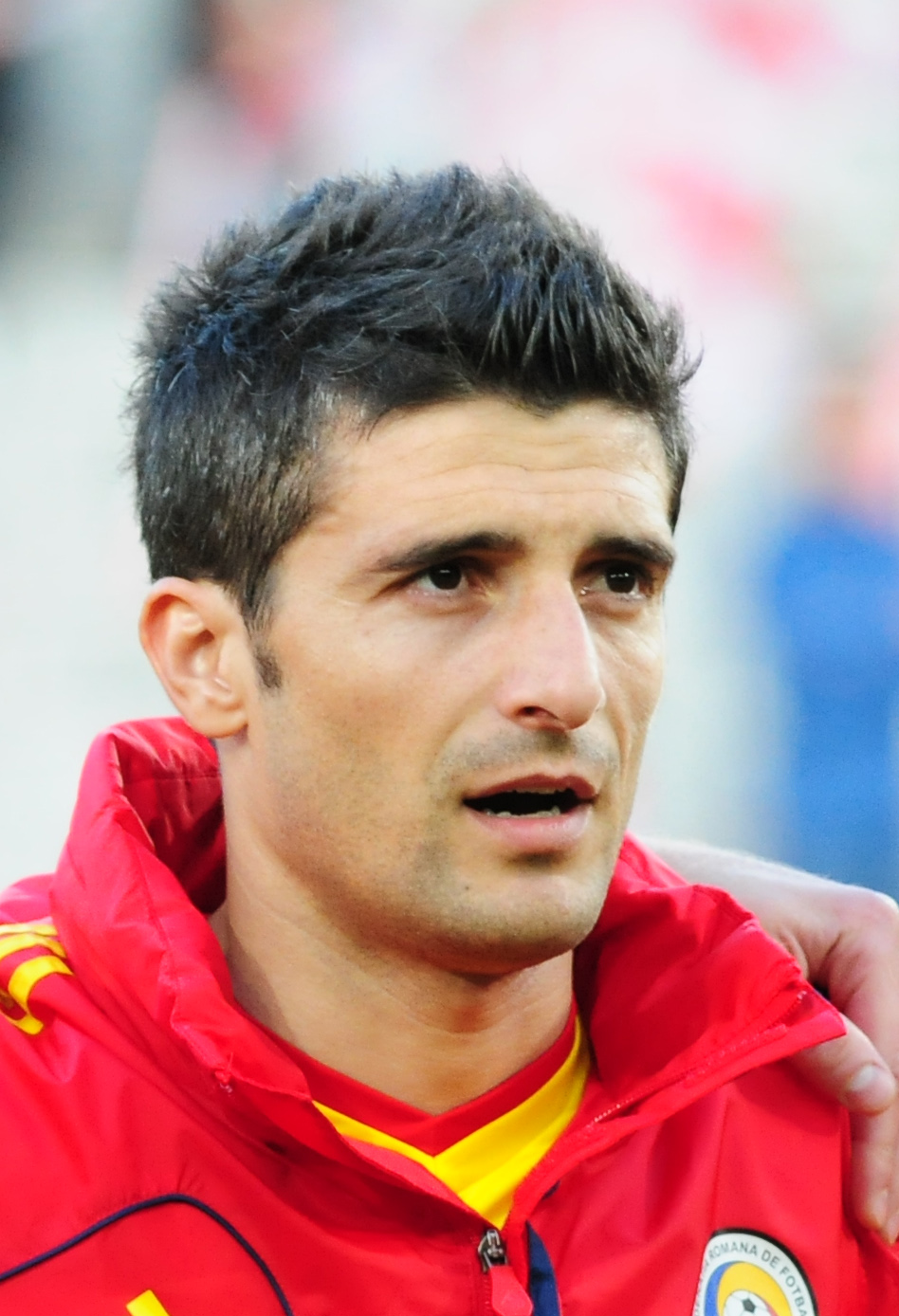
Daniel Niculae, also a symbol and the president of the club, after its refounding.

In summer 2016, after it became clear that the team could no longer be enrolled in the championship, the idea of setting up somewhere in the lower leagues appeared, more exactly, in the Bucharest Championship, Liga V. A split between the supporters and the people directly involved in the club appeared, resulting in two new clubs, AFC Rapid București and Mișcarea Feroviară CFR, after initially not less than four teams had been announced; but most of the projects did not survive. If AFC Rapid, owned by ex-Rapid marketing director, Horia Manoliu, who was in fact an old executive of the parent club, between 2001 and 2006. Mișcarea Feroviară was founded by the members of the Rapid Aristocratic Club. Both teams had an excellent run and were promoted to Liga IV Bucharest.

The two clubs did not seem to have the force to succeed with the new promotion. So, in summer 2017, at the initiative of Sector 1 Municipality, the sports association, Academia Rapid București, was set up and enrolled in the Liga IV – Bucharest series. This club is run by former Rapid players such as Daniel Niculae (president), Daniel Pancu (technical director), Nicolae Stanciu (manager), and Constantin Schumacher (coach). By the time the auction for the bankrupt company's brand was finalized, Academia Rapid concluded a lease agreement for a period of one year. This team has proven to be popular among supporters, who consider it the moral successor of the parent club. In the same summer, Mișcarea Feroviară disappeared.

Academia Rapid won the 2017–18 Liga IV Bucharest against Steaua București. Also, the Romanian Cup trophy for Bucharest preliminary rounds entered the club's treasury and the phoenix club of Rapid qualified for the next season's Liga III after a two-legged promotion play-off match against FC Singureni, the Giurgiu County champions, which they won 17–1 on aggregate.

On 12 June 2018, after 18 auctions which saw the price of the Rapid brand fall by about €3 million, Academia Rapid bought the FC Rapid București brand, officially becoming the successor to the original club. The transaction was made for the amount of €406,800, thus giving legitimacy to the new entity, even though it had already been accepted by most supporters and legends of the club as the successor of the original club, a fact confirmed in the championship match against Steaua București on 14 April, when 37,000 fans attended the match in the Arena Națională.

The start of the 2018–19 season came with a number of difficulties for Rapid. Despite being 1st in the league, the football produced by the team suffered, and, as a result, coach Constantin Schumacher was replaced with former-player Daniel Pancu, which also led to the departures of Daniel Niculae and Vasile Maftei. On 24 November, Rapid played its last game in Giulesti, which was going to be demolished later that year to make space for a new Category 4 Stadium. They would play future matches at Regie until the completion of their new stadium. On 12 May, Rapid mathematically obtained the promotion to Liga II with a 3–0 win against the main contender, Unirea Slobozia. They finished the season in first with 75 points, 11 ahead of second place.

The new 2019–20 season saw Rapid in the Romanian second Division, with Daniel Pancu as the head coach of the team. Victories against 1st and 2nd-ranked teams, UTA Arad (2–0) and CS Mioveni (5–1), gave the team hope for promotion, and Rapid found themselves in 3rd place after the first half of the season. The winter break came, and after a poor start to the second half of the season, Daniel Pancu was sacked from the club. Dan Alexa was appointed as the new head coach of the team. Exactly as with Daniel Pancu, Dan Alexa didn't succeed in giving the club a boost; so, he was sacked from the club in a few months' time. After Dan Alexa, Adrian Iencsi was hired as head coach; he also didn't perform. As the club had no more ideas of whom to bring on the team, they let Mihai Iosif, the assistant coach of the club, become the new head coach. Iosif did what none of his predecessors could do, and brought Rapid to the first Romanian League (Liga I). Rapid began the 2021–22 season in the Liga I very well, with five consecutive wins and no goals conceded in seven matches, which is a record in Romania.

== Crest and colours ==
=== Colors ===
The official colors of the club are white and burgundy, from those of the capital of Romania. These can be found on the coat of arms and equipment used throughout its long history. These were chosen by Teofil Copaci, Grigore Grigoriu, Dumitru Constantinescu, Géza Ginzer, Tudor Petre, and Franz Hladt, who founded the club. The first equipment was made from burgundy cloth in Grigore Grigoriu's house, and the boots with crampons were reconditioned from used boots from Ateliere.

=== Crest ===
The crest of the Rapid Bucharest was usually composed of the CFR-ist symbol. In a short period after the beginning of the communist system in Romania, Rapidul was forced by the communist authorities to return to the name CFR Bucharest. In 1950, it would become Locomotiva Bucharest, with a red steam locomotive as its symbol. From 1958, the club renamed itself Rapid Bucharest, adopting the logo that changed relatively little until the purchase of the club by George Copos, who changed the coat of arms upon his arrival. In 2001, Rapid's current crest was chosen. It turned out that the source of inspiration is, it seems, an emblematic club of Europe, namely Benfica Lisbon, the most successful club in Portugal, on whose emblem appears a legendary eagle.

=== Anthem ===
The Rapid anthem, also known as "We are everywhere at home", was composed by Victor Socaciu, with lyrics by Adrian Păunescu. This anthem was born in June 1980, at the Flacăra editorial office, Adrian Păunescu meeting with Victor Socaciu, Ovidiu Ioanițoaia, a sports journalist at Flacăra magazine, and with Victor Niță, also from Flacăra. The motifs for the hymn came quickly to Păunescu, and he started composing on the spot. At the same time, Ovidiu Ioanițoaia was writing the dictated verses on a napkin. At the centenary of the club, the football club and the sports club created a music album, on which the president of the club Daniel Niculae also sang.

== Grounds ==
=== Stadium ===
Superbet Arena-Giulești
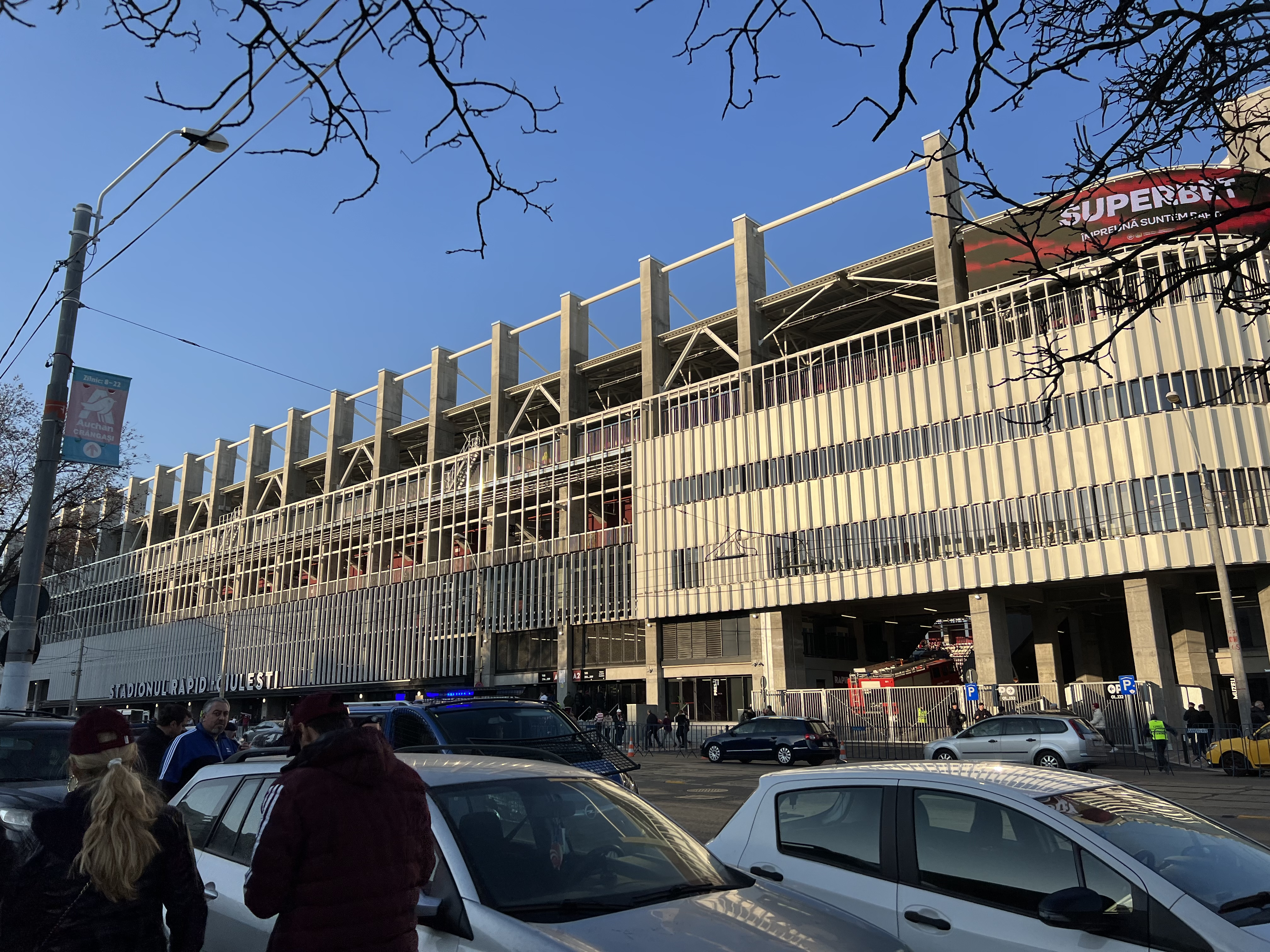
- Location: 18 Giulești Way, Giulești, Bucharest Bucharest, Romania
- Owner: CS Rapid București
- Capacity: 14,047
- Surface: Grass

Construction
- Groundbreaking: 26 February 2019
- Opened: 26 March 2022
- Architect: Construcții Erbașu

The history of Giulești-Valentin Stănescu Stadium begins in 1934; on 31 March, CFR began the construction of a field on the Giulești Road. The field would have a width of 65 m and a length of 105 m.

At first, the mayor of Bucharest did not want to authorize the construction of the first stadium, because it did not fit in the systematization of the capital. Eventually, authorization was given; and in April 1936 it was estimated that the stadium would be ready in September. The construction did begin in that year but it lasted more than two. The chief architect was Gheorghe Dumitrescu.

The stadium was inaugurated on 10 June 1939. At the time, it was the most modern stadium in Romania, a smaller replica of Arsenal's Highbury Stadium, with a capacity of 12,160 seats. Among the guests at the opening ceremony was King Carol II and his son, future King Michael of Romania.

The construction of the north stands was finished in the mid-1990s, with the capacity increased to 19,100 seats. In 2003, the pitch was changed and was considered to be the best in Romania at the time. Floodlights were installed in the summer of 2000. The stadium got the name of "Valentin Stănescu" in 2001, in respect of the manager who won the first championship for Rapid, but it is still commonly known as "Giulești Stadium", from the name of the neighborhood it is located in. Landmarks near the stadium are the Grant Bridge, Giulești Theatre, Gara de Nord (North Station), and the Grivița Railway Yards.

The stadium was closed on 24 November 2018, and the demolition process took place from 10 January to 7 May 2019, making room for the modern 14,000-seat Rapid Arena. The new stadium's construction will be funded by the Romanian government and UEFA, after Bucharest was announced as one of the host cities for UEFA Euro 2020.

After the closing of Giulești Stadium, Rapid moved temporarily on the Regie Stadium in Bucharest, the former home ground of Sportul Studențesc. Regie Stadium was closed in 2014 after a conflict between Sportul and the stadium's owner, a fact that led to its degradation. Before moving, the white and burgundies needed to invest in the reconstruction of their new stadium, which began in January 2019.

After its promotion in Liga I in the summer of 2021, the team played its home fixtures at the Arena Națională. The new Stadium Rapid-Giulești, known as Superbet Arena for sponsorship reasons, was inaugurated on 26 March 2022. It cost €67 million and can hold up to 14,050 spectators.

=== Training Facilities ===
Located in the north-western side of Bucharest, in the Bucharest Noi district, the ProRapid sports center was purchased by the then owner George Copos at the request of Mircea Lucescu, the coach who won the second championship, and was inaugurated in 1998. Initially, the complex had four football fields and a modern training facility. But, over the years, the structure has deteriorated due to the carelessness of the owners. Still, at the end of the 90s, "Pro Rapid" was considered the most modern training base in the country.

The facility spans five hectares and includes several playgrounds, three tennis courts, and an indoor swimming pool. There is a building where the players used to train. The facility is surrounded by Lake Străulesti, around which several buildings are distributed: the second building in order of size houses the living accommodations for the players on the first floor, medical rooms on the ground floor (including physiotherapy and rehabilitation), changing rooms (for players and coach), and a gym. The accommodation for the players of the youth teams is located in a building that includes a bar and a restaurant. In June 2016, the company SC FC Rapid SA was declared bankrupt by the Bucharest Court and the ProRapid base entered a period of continuous deterioration. At the moment, the football team is training at the Coresi training base.

== Support ==
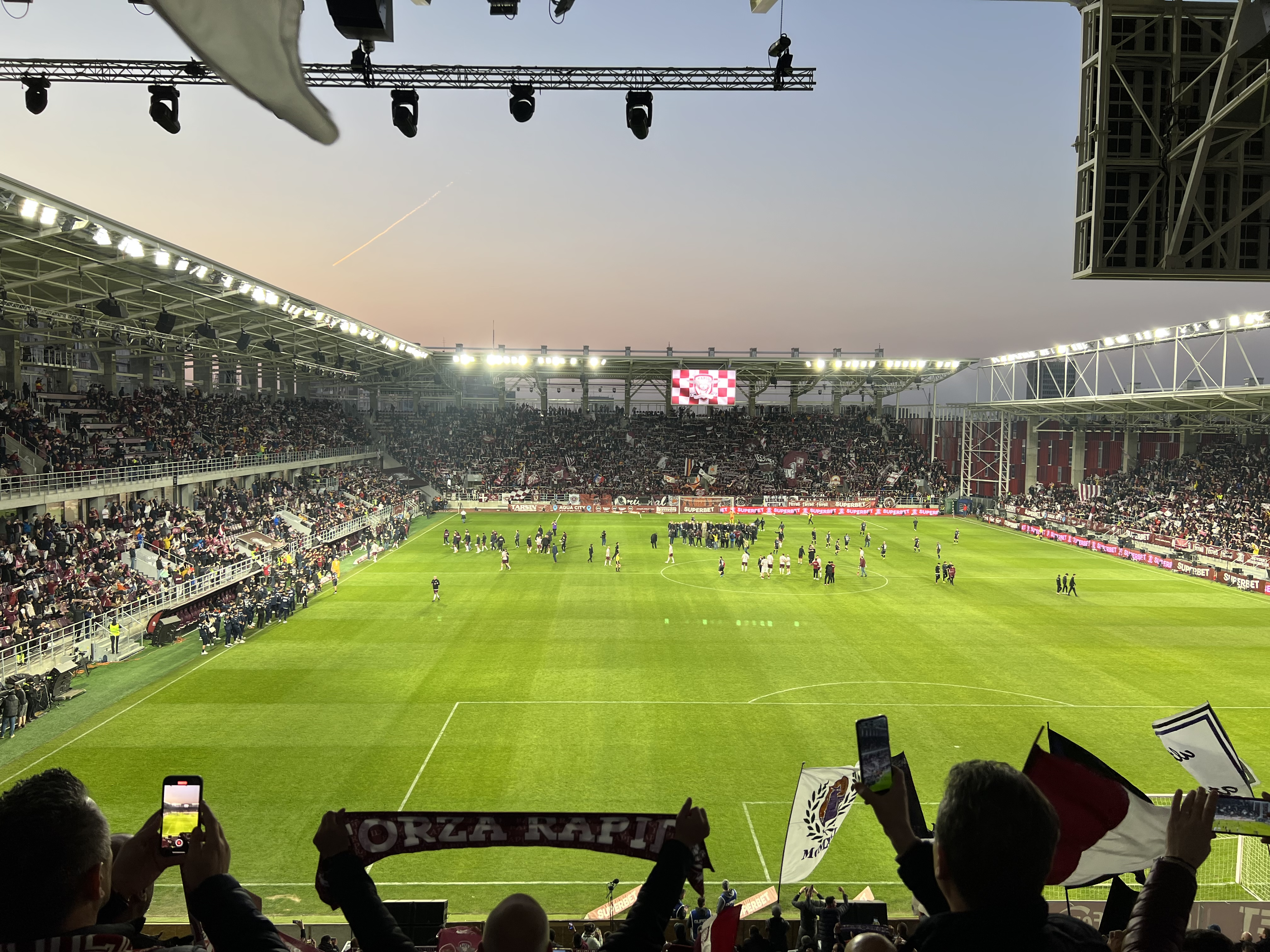
The new stadium as seen from the South Stand on opening day, 26 March 2022

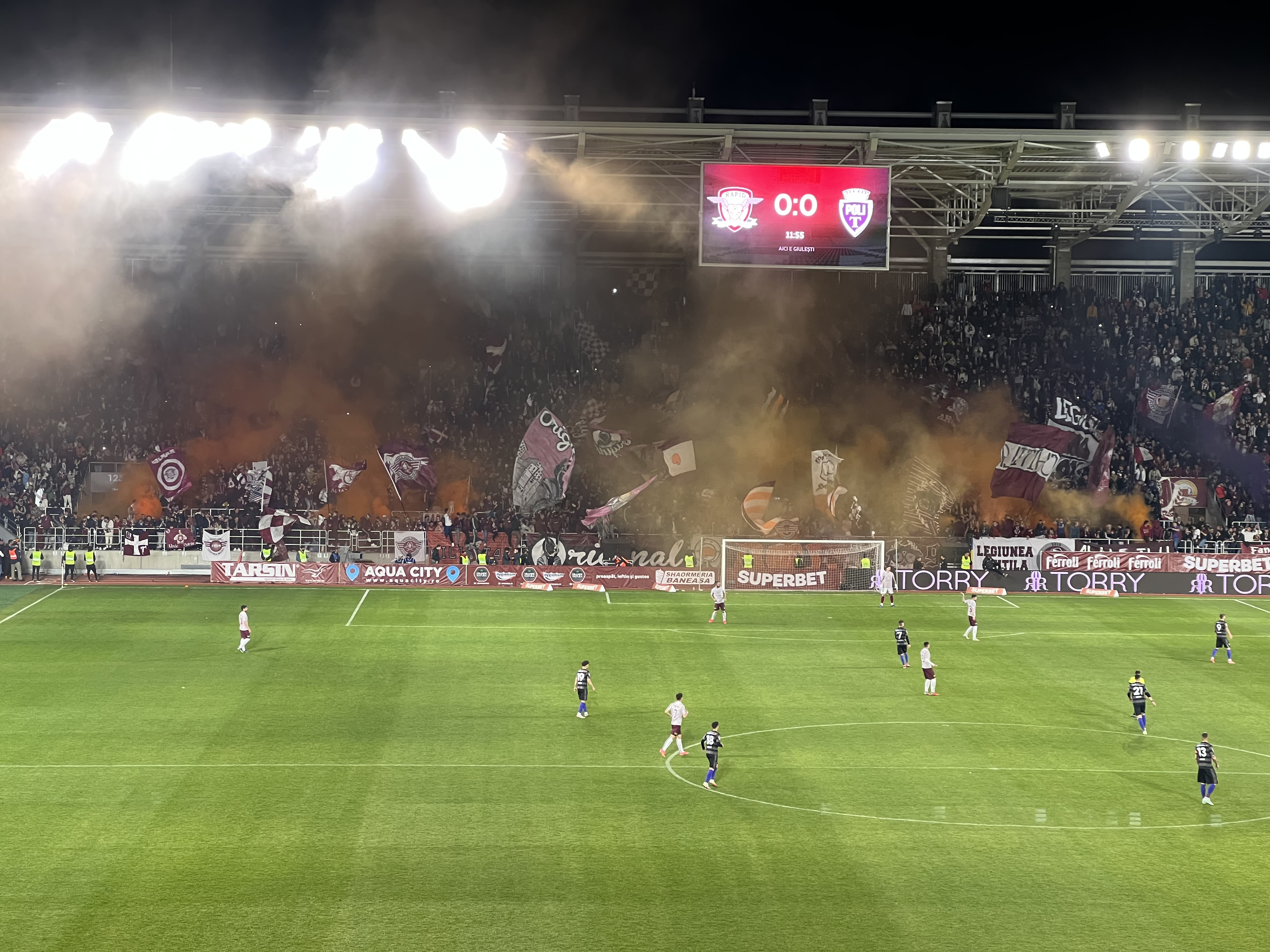
Rapid București fans on the day of the new stadium inauguration.

Rapid București is, according to a 2013 survey, the third-most supported club in Romania and the second in the Bucharest metropolitan area, around 20% of football lovers in the city being supporters of Rapid. A unique organization in the country is the "Aristocratic Club of Rapid", which was founded in 2000. Its members include well-known artists, who aim to defend the history of Rapid and maintain its traditions.

However, at the beginning, being the railway club, Rapid drew its supporters mostly from people linked with the workers. The first waves of new fans came at the beginning of the 1930s, when Rapid's golden team won the hearts of many people delighted by their spectacular play and the consecutive wins of the Romanian Cup between 1935 and 1942 .

In 1967, actor Mihai Ioan organised and taught the supporters how to sing chants, thus becoming the first leader of the gallery in the club's history. Currently, Rapid ultras are represented by Peluza Nord and also formerly by Tribuna II (t2 Rapid). Until 2002, Rapid Bucharest had a head of the gallery who stood at the head of the fans for 32 years, Constantin Mincea, Geamgiul. He is known for chanting against the communist party during Romania's communist regime, Rapid's fans had some chants that targeted the Ceaușescu family, the Romanian Communist Party (PCR), and clubs they considered as being protected by the regime, such as Steaua București, Dinamo București, Victoria București, Olt Scornicești, and Flacăra Moreni. Rapid fans were the first in Romania to support the ultras movement in the 1980s, but the first ultras groups were founded in 1998, named as Official Hooligans, Bombardierii, and Ultras Unione. Later, others appeared such as: Maniacs, Brigada 921, Grant Ultras 06, Radicals, Torcida Visinie, Chicos del Infierno (CDI) 2005, Ultra' Stil, Legiunea Chitila, Devil's Gate, Granata Girls, SVRB, Colletivo, RHV, Original, Capitali, Legione Titan, and there were also groups in the provinces, in cities such as: Iași, Pașcani, Piatra Neamț, Zalău, and Târgu Mureș. In 2007, the ultras group, Pirații, moved to the second stands of the stadium, following divergences with the leader of the Peluza Nord. They were followed by other brigades from the Peluza Nord.

t2 Rapid (Piratii, CDI, Ultra' Stil) does not have a leader, distinguishing it from the other group. Over time there have been many conflicts between the two factions, and as a result, the members of Tribuna II groups left definitely, founding a new team, ACS Rapid-Frumosii Nebuni ai Giulestiului. One of the most publicized incidents in Romanian football was the "Bricheta" case, when the Bucharest derby was stopped and Rapid lost 0–3.

The supporters from Politehnica Timișoara and Rapid are bound by a friendship of 30 years. The beginnings of this friendship was at the final of the Romanian Cup in the 1980-81 season, when the Rapid-Pandurii and Politehnica Timișoara-U Craiova matches were played together. The Olten people present at the match showed solidarity, which is why the Timișoara and Giulești supporters had to support each other. After the Revolution, the supporters from the rapid gallery came to Timisoara with wreaths that they laid at the heroes' cemetery, to commemorate those who died in December 1989.

== Club rivalries ==
=== Bucharest Derby ===
The club's most important rivalries are against neighbouring FC Steaua București. (Note: There is currently a legal debate over the identity of the other club—CSA Steaua owns the name and brand, while FCSB claims the ongoing top-division history.) The two clubs have played each other over 130 times, beginning with Rapid's 1–0 victory on 4 November 1947. Several matches throughout the years between Steaua and Rapid have ended in serious clashes between fans. The two teams are notable for their dominance of Romanian football, alongside Dinamo. The conflict has become even fiercer after Steaua passed Rapid in an all-Romanian quarter-final of the 2005–06 UEFA Cup. The rivalry also extends to other sports. The local sports newspapers said that the two teams were linked in this quarter-final by the Number 41 tram which links the Ghencea Stadium with the Valentin Stănescu Stadium. The rivalry also extends to other sports.

=== Primvs Derby ===
Another important rival of Rapid is Petrolul Ploiești, which was previously based in the capital and with which it contests the Primus Derby, the oldest football derby in Romania. The first episode of the Petrolul-Rapid rivalry was in the 1965-66 season, Petrolul and Rapid fought for the title of Romanian champion, and Prahoven won. The team trained at that time by Constantin Cernăianu prevailed over its rival and won the most recent championship title in the history of the club. A year later, Rapid got revenge and won its first title, after a draw in Ploiesti. In the battle with Dinamo for first place, the Giuleșteni needed a point in the match with Petrolul in the last stage. Rică Răducanu and his colleagues got the equaliser, and the Rapid supporters returned on foot from Ploiesti, as they had promised before the match.

Among the thousands of fans was Ioana Radu, the well-known popular music singer and a big fan of the rapidists. At the end of the 1973–1974 season, both teams were relegated together to Division B. In the period 1978–1982, both teams were in Division B. The culminating match between the two took place in the spring of 1982, at Stadionul Steaua, in front of 35,000 spectators, in the 30th stage of Division B. The Rapidists prevailed with a clear 5–1 win. Another landmark match between the two teams was the final of the Romanian Cup in 1995, at the end of which Petrolul won the second cup in their history, after defeating Rapid on penalty kicks. During the 1983–2004 period, both teams were in Division A, with Petrolul subsequently relegating at the end of the 2003–04 season. The rivalry also extends to other sports.

Rapid had other Bucharest rivals, such as Dinamo Bucuresti, Progresul București, and Venus București, as well as derbies against teams of the Romanian Railways such as CFR Cluj and CFR Timișoara. Other, less important rivalries are with Universitatea Cluj, Farul Constanța, Universitatea Craiova, and UTA Arad.

== Ownership and finances ==
Rapid is a joint-stock company since 1992. The property is divided as follows: 50% is attributed to Victor Angelescu and Dan Sucu, and the remaining 3% belongs to Academia Rapid Bucharest 1923. After a first bankruptcy, FC Rapid could no longer register new contracts, so they could not build a team to enter the 2016–17 season. Finally, on 14 December 2016, Rapid was officially declared bankrupt after half a season of inactivity. Since 1992, the giulestea club was led by the businessman George Copos, who then led the club to two championships in 2013. After his conviction in the Transfer File, he sold the club to Nicolae Cristescu, who led the club only 3 years, it then being bought by Valerii Moraru.

On 12 June 2018, after 18 auctions during which the price of the Rapid brand dropped by approximately 3 million euros, Academia Rapid bought the Rapid Bucharest brand, officially becoming the successor of the original club. The transaction was for the sum of €406,800, thus giving legitimacy to the new entity, although it had already been accepted by most of the club's supporters and legends as the club's successor. On 26 July 2018 Victor Angelescu bought approximately 40% of the club's shares and later in 2022, he acquired the majority of the shares, becoming the majority shareholder of the Giulestean club. On 24 May 2022 businessman Dan Sucu purchased 50% of the club's shares.

== Statistics and records ==
In its history, the club has participated 69 seasons in Liga I and 15 seasons in Liga II: these statistics place it in third place for number of participations in Liga I, after Dinamo Bucuresti and FCSB.

Rapid has played in 88 editions of the Romanian Cup, the first time in 1933–34, winning 13 editions, while in the Romanian Supercup they have had twelve appearances, the first in 1998, the last in 2007. European competitions involve participation in 95 European cup matches, in 4 competitions over 22 seasons. The club has won the Romanian Cup 13 times and have played in 6 finals of this event; they also triumphed in four of the six Romanian Supercup matches in which they participated. In terms of European cups, Giulestenii triumphed in the Balkan Cup in 1964 and in the European Railway Championship in 1968 and played in the final of the European Railway Championship in 1961 and 1971.

Since the establishment of the championship, the team finished first three times, second 14 times, obtaining the worst ranking in the 1973-74 championship with a final 16th place, from which it obtained relegation to the second division of Romania. The Cherry Eagles finished Division A with the best offense in the tournament on many occasions and with the best defense six times.

Between 1990 and 2012 Rapid achieved the most important results in the club's recent history, winning two league titles and advancing in European cups. The most capped player for the team is Nae Stanciu who played for 12 years. Furthermore, Ion Ionescu is the team's top scorer with 107 goals. The most seasons as team captain was Dumitru Macri, who was captain for 14 years, when he played 221 matches. Ilie Greavu is the second-most selected player, with 294 games for Rapid, followed by Constantin Năsturescu, who played 288 games for Giulesti. Daniel Pancu is the club's second top scorer with 94 goals in 265 games, followed by Sandu Neagu who scored 92 goals. n total, 88 coaches have led Rapid.

The first coach was Marin Himer, who led the team from 1923 to 1925. The longest-serving Rapid coach was Valentin Stănescu, who remained in charge for five seasons; under his leadership, the club won its first championship in 1967. Mircea Lucescu guided the team to the championship in 1999, followed by Mircea Rednic, who won the title in 2003.

Rapid's most successful coach is Valentin Stănescu with whom Giulesteni managed historical performances, led the team when they won the Balkan Cup twice and the domestic championship in 1966. One of Giulesti's most famous coaches was Ion Motroc who spent 9 years as a player; as a coach he caused one of the biggest surprises of Romanian football, by winning the Romanian Cup from the Second Division. Răzvan Lucescu led the club from 2004 to 2007 and guided it to its best European performance by reaching the quarter-finals of the 2005–06 UEFA Cup. Ștefan Auer won back-to-back Romanian Cups in the interwar period; Iuliu Baratky also won back-to-back Romanian Cups. Bazil Marian was the manager who returned the cup to Giulesti after a 30-year spell. In the history of Rapid there have been many presidents, the first was Teofil Copaci, who founded the club and led Rapid in the interwar period. The club was led by the Ministry of Transport in the period before the leadership of George Copos, under whom Dinu Gheorghe was club president. Afterwards, this position varied from person to person; among the most important leaders of Rapid were Grigore Sichitiu, Nicolae Manea. In 2003, the president Ioan Becali and Dan Petrescu were prompted by their status as 'Dinamo' and 'Steaua' fan to kiss the Rapid flag, this was a remarkable moment of the 2000s.

== Popular culture ==
As Rapid is currently one of the most popular football team in Romania, a good number of musicians, TV, and film directors have been inspired from ideas linked to the Giulesti-based club. Popular references, however, appeared only after the Romanian Revolution, as, before, mass-media programmes were mostly being controlled by the communist regime. The Prima TV comedy show Trăsniții in one episode, showed the Pupaza character in the role of a Rapid supporter. Also, in 2022 the series on Pro TV Las Fierbinti had some characters as Rapid fans.

Several other examples from music can be attributed as Rapid-related. Apart from club anthems played throughout time by Adrian Păunescu. Rapid has a lot of supporters, many of whom are celebrities in Romania: for example Fărâmită Lambru, Maria Tanase, Dan Grigore, Horia Brenciu, Mircea Geoană, Ion Iliescu, and Nicolae Vacaroiu.

The book Glasul roților de tren by Ioan Chirilă is one of the most famous books about sports in Romania. This book has become a bible for Rapid supporters.

== Honours ==
=== Domestic ===
==== Leagues ====
- Divizia A / Liga I
  - Winners (3): 1966–67, 1998–99, 2002–03
  - Runners-up (14): 1936–37, 1937–38, 1939–40, 1940–41, 1948–49, 1950, 1963–64, 1964–65, 1965–66, 1969–70, 1970–71, 1997–98, 1999–2000, 2005–06
- Divizia B / Liga II
  - Winners (6): 1952, 1955, 1974–75, 1982–83, 1989–90, 2015–16
  - Runners-up (4): 1979–80, 1981–82, 2013–14, 2020–21
- Liga III
  - Winners (1): 2018–19
- Liga IV Bucharest (Regional)
  - Winners (1): 2017–18
- Liga V Bucharest (as Mișcarea Feroviară CFR) (Regional)
  - Runners-up (1): 2016–17

==== Cups ====
- Cupa României
  - Winners (13): 1934–35, 1936–37, 1937–38, 1938–39, 1939–40, 1940–41, 1941–42, 1971–72, 1974–75, 1997–98, 2001–02, 2005–06, 2006–07
  - Runners-up (6): 1960–61, 1961–62, 1967–68, 1994–95, 1998–99, 2011–12
- Supercupa României
  - Winners (4): 1999, 2002, 2003, 2007
  - Runners-up (2): 1998, 2006
- Cupa României – Bucharest (Regional)
  - Winners (1): 2017–18
- Cupa Ligii
  - Winners (1): 1994
- Cupa Basarabiei (Regional)
  - Winners (1): 1942
- Cupa Primăverii (Transitional tournament)
  - Winners (1): 1957

=== Continental ===
- Mitropa Cup
  - Finalists (1): 1940 (Note: The final between Rapid București and Ferencváros was scheduled to take place in July 1940. However, due to the events of World War II it was cancelled.)
- Balkans Cup
  - Winners (2): 1963–64, 1964–66
- European Railways Cup
  - Winners (1): 1968
  - Runners-up (2): 1961, 1971

== European record ==
=== Notable wins ===
Season	Match	Score
Mitropa Cup
1938	Rapid – (Hungary) Újpest	4 – 0
1938	Rapid – (Italy) Genoa	2 – 1
1940	Rapid – (Hungary) MTK Budapest	3 – 0
UEFA Cup Winners' Cup
1972–73	Rapid – (Austria) Rapid Wien	3 – 1
1975–76	Rapid – (Belgium) Anderlecht	1 – 0
UEFA Cup / Europa League
1971–72	Rapid – (Italy) Napoli	2 – 0
1971–72	Rapid – (Poland) Legia Warsaw	4 – 0
1994–95	Rapid – (Germany) Eintracht Frankfurt	2 – 1
1996–97	Rapid – (Germany) Karlsruhe	1 – 0
2005–06	Rapid – (Netherlands) Feyenoord	1 – 0
2005–06	Rapid – (France) Rennes	2 – 0
2005–06	Rapid – (Ukraine) Shakhtar Donetsk	1 – 0
2005–06	Rapid – (Germany) Hertha Berlin	2 – 0
2005–06	Rapid – (Germany) Hamburger SV	2 – 0
2012–13	Rapid – (Netherlands) Heerenveen	1 – 0

== Players ==
=== First-team squad ===
As of 26 October 2026

Note: Flags indicate national team as defined under FIFA eligibility rules; some limited exceptions apply. Players may hold more than one non-FIFA nationality.

No.	Pos.	Nation	Player
5	DF	ROU	Alexandru Pașcanu (4th captain)
6	DF	NED	Lars Kramer (Captain)
7	FW	LBR	Mohammed Kamara
8	MF	ROU	Constantin Grameni
9	FW	SUI	Filip Stojilković (on loan from Pisa)
10	MF	ROU	Claudiu Petrila
13	DF	ROU	Denis Ciobotariu
15	MF	ROU	Cătălin Vulturar
16	GK	ROU	Marian Aioani (3rd captain)
18	DF	GAM	Sheriff Sinyan
19	DF	ROU	Răzvan Onea (Vice-captain)
21	DF	ROU	Robert Sălceanu
22	MF	MNE	Vladan Bubanja (on loan from Orenburg)
23	DF	ROU	Cristian Manea
25	MF	ROU	Andrei Niculcea
26	MF	ROU	Cosmin Pîrvu
27	DF	GHA	Ebenezer Annan (on loan from Saint-Étienne)
29	MF	ROU	Alexandru Dobre

No.	Pos.	Nation	Player
32	DF	ROU	Mihai Costache
34	FW	ROU	Erik Mănăilă
35	FW	ROU	David Niculescu
37	FW	ROU	Vlad Berceanu
38	FW	ROU	David Grama
39	MF	ROU	Luca Buzdugan
40	FW	ROU	Mihai Grosu
42	DF	SLO	Alin Kumer (on loan from Genoa)
44	MF	BFA	Chec Doumbia (on loan from Genoa)
55	MF	ROU	Rareș Pop
66	DF	BFA	Latif Ouedraogo (on loan from Genoa)
68	GK	ROU	Răzvan Ducan
70	GK	ROU	Alex Șimonia
77	FW	ROU	Jason Kodor
79	MF	CIV	Eric Tape
80	MF	ROU	Olimpiu Moruțan
90	FW	SVK	Timotej Jambor
98	FW	ROU	Raul Stanciu

=== Dual registration ===
Note: Flags indicate national team as defined under FIFA eligibility rules; some limited exceptions apply. Players may hold more than one non-FIFA nationality.

No.	Pos.	Nation	Player
17	DF	ROU	Ștefan Senciuc (at CSL Ștefănești)
20	MF	ROU	Andrei Șucu (at CSL Ștefănești)

No.	Pos.	Nation	Player
99	GK	ROU	Bogdan Ungureanu (at CSL Ștefănești)

=== Other players under contract ===
Note: Flags indicate national team as defined under FIFA eligibility rules; some limited exceptions apply. Players may hold more than one non-FIFA nationality.

No.	Pos.	Nation	Player
3	DF	BIH	Daniel Graovac
28	MF	SRB	Luka Gojković

No.	Pos.	Nation	Player
33	FW	BRA	Talisson
—	FW	FRA	Antoine Baroan

=== Out on loan ===
Note: Flags indicate national team as defined under FIFA eligibility rules; some limited exceptions apply. Players may hold more than one non-FIFA nationality.

No.	Pos.	Nation	Player
88	MF	ROU	Omar El Sawy (at UTA Arad until 30 June 2027)
—	GK	ROU	Patrick Strizu (at Afumați until 30 June 2027)
—	DF	GHA	Mohamed Bakayoko (at CSL Ștefănești until 30 June 2027)
—	DF	ROU	Robert Banu (at Progresul Mogoșoaia until 30 June 2027)
—	MF	ROU	Sebastian Banu (at Concordia Chiajna until 30 June 2027)

No.	Pos.	Nation	Player
—	MF	KOS	Drilon Hazrollaj (at Tirana until 30 June 2027)
—	MF	ROU	Andi Seceleanu (at Oxigen București until 30 June 2027)
—	MF	ROU	Luca Stoica (at Metaloglobus București until 30 June 2027)
—	FW	ROU	Andrei Antonescu (at Unirea Dej until 30 June 2027)
—	FW	ROU	Antonio Preda (at Progresul Spartac București until 30 June 2027)

== Club officials ==
=== Board of directors ===
Role	Name
Owners	(Romania) Dan Șucu (92.5%) (Romania) Victor Angelescu (7.5%)
President	(Romania) Victor Angelescu
Board member	(Romania) Robert Niță
Executive Director	(Romania) Mircea Burcescu
Judicial Director	(Romania) Marian Mihail
Financial Director	(Romania) Crenguța Moise
Sporting Director	(Romania) Marius Bilașco
Scouting Director	(Romania) Mario Nicolae
Youth Center Director	(Romania) Vasile Maftei
Team Manager	(Romania) Florentin Ion
Delegate	(Romania) Ionuț Voicu
Press Officer	(Romania) Cornelia Vlădan
Security Director	(Romania) Adrian Olariu
Secretary	(Romania) Luiza Goiciu

- Last updated: 3 April 2026

=== Current technical staff ===
Role	Name
Head coach	(Romania) Daniel Pancu
Assistant coaches	(Portugal) Geraldo Alves (Romania) Marius Suller
Goalkeeping coach	(Romania) Leontin Toader
Fitness coaches	(Romania) Armando Lungu (Italy) Eros Giglia (Spain) Daniel de Castro
Video analyst	(Romania) Ciprian Niță
Club doctor	(Romania) Dan Wanya-Crîngu
Physiotherapists	(Romania) Dan Borcea (Romania) Adrian Mitea (Romania) Florin Dragne
Masseur	(Romania) Marian Ionică
Storemen	(Romania) Adrian Tărchilă (Romania) Cornel Mateiași

- Last updated: 17 June 2026

== League history ==
Season	Tier	Division	Place	National Cup
2026–27	1	Liga I	TBD	TBD
2025–26	1	Liga I	5th	Group stage
2024–25	1	Liga I	5th	Semi-finals
2023–24	1	Liga I	6th	Group stage
2022–23	1	Liga I	5th	Group stage
2021–22	1	Liga I	9th	Round of 16
2020–21	2	Liga II	2nd (P)	Fourth round
2019–20	2	Liga II	6th	Round of 32
2018–19	3	Liga III (Seria II)	1st (C, P)	Round of 32
2017–18	4	Liga IV (B)	1st (C, P)	Regional Phase
2016–17	5	Liga V (B)*	1st (C, P)	
2015–16	2	Liga II (Seria I)	1st (C, R)	Fifth Round
2014–15	1	Liga I	16th (R)	Round of 16
2013–14	2	Liga II (Seria I)	2nd (P)	Round of 16
2012–13	1	Liga I	8th (R)	Quarter-finals
2011–12	1	Liga I	4th	Final
2010–11	1	Liga I	4th	Quarter-finals
2009–10	1	Liga I	7th	Round of 16
2008–09	1	Liga I	8th	Quarter-finals

Season	Tier	Division	Place	National Cup
2007–08	1	Liga I	3rd	Quarter-finals
2006–07	1	Liga I	4th	Winners
2005–06	1	Divizia A	2nd	Winners
2004–05	1	Divizia A	3rd	Round of 32
2003–04	1	Divizia A	3rd	Quarter-finals
2002–03	1	Divizia A	1st (C)	Round of 16
2001–02	1	Divizia A	3rd	Winners
2000–01	1	Divizia A	4th	Quarter-finals
1999–00	1	Divizia A	2nd	Semi-finals
1998–99	1	Divizia A	1st (C)	Final
1997–98	1	Divizia A	2nd	Winners
1996–97	1	Divizia A	8th	Round of 32
1995–96	1	Divizia A	3rd	Round of 32
1994–95	1	Divizia A	4th	Final
1993–94	1	Divizia A	4th	Round of 16
1992–93	1	Divizia A	4th	Round of 16
1991–92	1	Divizia A	7th	Round of 16
1990–91	1	Divizia A	11th	Round of 16
1989–90	2	Divizia B (Seria II)	1st (C, P)	Round of 16

- As CS Mișcarea CFR București.

== Notable former players ==
The footballers enlisted below have had international cap(s) for their respective countries at junior and/or senior level and/or more than 100 appearances for FC Rapid București.

Romania

- (Romania) Alexandru Albu
- (Romania) Iordan Angelescu
- (Romania) Valentin Bădoi
- (Romania) Ștefan Barbu
- (Romania) Alexandru Boc
- (Romania) Ion Bogdan
- (Romania) Mugur Bolohan
- (Romania) Andrei Borza
- (Romania) Florin Bratu
- (Romania) Mugurel Buga
- (Romania) Zeno Bundea
- (Romania) Iulian Chiriță
- (Romania) Vasile Chiroiu
- (Romania) Teofil Codreanu
- (Romania) Dan Coe
- (Romania) Dănuț Coman
- (Romania) Marius Constantin
- (Romania) Florin Constantinovici
- (Romania) Vintilă Cossini
- (Romania) Ion Costea
- (Romania) Iosif Damaschin
- (Romania) Marian Damaschin
- (Romania) Emil Dică
- (Romania) Emilian Dolha
- (Romania) Virgil Drăghia
- (Romania) Cristian Dulca
- (Romania) Gheorghe Dumitrașcu
- (Romania) Ion Dumitru
- (Romania) Emil Dumitriu
- (Romania) Gheorghe Ene II
- (Romania) Ștefan Filotti
- (Romania) Ionel Ganea
- (Romania) Gheorghe Georgescu
- (Romania) Nicolae Georgescu
- (Romania) Tiberiu Ghioane
- (Romania) Ion Goanță

Romania

- (Romania) Ilie Greavu
- (Romania) Nicolae Grigore
- (Romania) Ștefan Grigorie
- (Romania) Ovidiu Herea
- (Romania) Adrian Iencsi
- (Romania) Róbert Ilyés
- (Romania) Ion Ionescu
- (Romania) Alexandru Ioniță II
- (Romania) Viorel Kraus
- (Romania) Costin Lazăr
- (Romania) Iosif Lengheriu
- (Romania) Bogdan Lobonț
- (Romania) Ion Lungu
- (Romania) Nicolae Lupescu
- (Romania) Dănuț Lupu
- (Romania) Dumitru Macri
- (Romania) Vasile Maftei
- (Romania) Marius Măldărășanu
- (Romania) Nicolae Manea
- (Romania) Bazil Marian
- (Romania) Stelian Marin
- (Romania) Florin Marin
- (Romania) Ionuț Mazilu
- (Romania) Ion Mihăilescu
- (Romania) Horațiu Moldovan
- (Romania) Viorel Moldovan
- (Romania) Ioachim Moldoveanu
- (Romania) Ion Motroc
- (Romania) Dorel Mutică
- (Romania) Ștefan Nanu
- (Romania) Constantin Năsturescu
- (Romania) Alexandru Neagu
- (Romania) Daniel Niculae
- (Romania) Titus Ozon
- (Romania) Daniel Pancu
- (Romania) Ștefan Pănoiu

Romania

- (Romania) Dănuț Perjă
- (Romania) Marian Petreanu
- (Romania) Ion Pop
- (Romania) Ionuț Rada
- (Romania) Marian Rada
- (Romania) Sergiu Radu
- (Romania) Andrei Rădulescu
- (Romania) Petre Rădulescu
- (Romania) Răducanu Necula
- (Romania) László Raffinsky
- (Romania) Gheorghe Rășinaru
- (Romania) Răzvan Raț
- (Romania) Mircea Rednic
- (Romania) Iosif Ritter
- (Romania) Mihai Roman
- (Romania) Ioan Sabău
- (Romania) Robert Sadowski
- (Romania) Cristian Săpunaru
- (Romania) Constantin Schumacher
- (Romania) Antonio Sefer
- (Romania) Vasile Seredai
- (Romania) Florin Șoavă
- (Romania) Nicolae Stanciu
- (Romania) Valentin Stănescu
- (Romania) Vasile Ștefan
- (Romania) Marius Șumudică
- (Romania) Dumitru Târțău
- (Romania) Florin Tene
- (Romania) Fănel Țîră
- (Romania) Leontin Toader
- (Romania) Georgică Vameșu
- (Romania) Ion Voicu
- (Romania) Ion Vlădoiu
- (Romania) Ianis Zicu

Armenia

- (Armenia) Apoula Edel
- (Armenia) Artavazd Karamyan

Australia

- (Australia) Ryan Griffiths

Belgium

- (Belgium) Roberto Bisconti
- (Belgium) Xian Emmers
- (Belgium) Emmanuel Godfroid
- (Belgium) Philippe Léonard

Brazil

- (Brazil) Elinton Andrade
- (Brazil) Césinha
- (Brazil) Gláuber
- (Brazil) Júnior Morais
- (Brazil) Marcos Antônio
- (Brazil) Peterson Peçanha
- (Brazil) Cláudio Pitbull
- (Brazil) Juliano Spadacio

Cameroon

- (Cameroon) Pierre Boya
- (Cameroon) Clinton N'Jie

Croatia

- (Croatia) Ljuban Crepulja
- (Croatia) Marko Dugandžić

Cyprus

- (Cyprus) (Belgium) Urko Pardo

Czech Republic

- (Czech Republic) Ondřej Kušnír

Estonia

- (Estonia) Mattias Käit

France

- (France) Jayson Papeau

Germany

- (Germany) Christopher Braun

Kosovo

- (Kosovo) Ermal Krasniqi
- (Kosovo) Albion Rrahmani
- (Kosovo) Florent Hasani

Montenegro

- (Montenegro) Vladimir Božović
- (Montenegro) Radomir Đalović

Nigeria

- (Nigeria) Olubayo Adefemi
- (Nigeria) Funsho Bamgboye

Norway

- (Norway) Tobias Christensen

Portugal

- (Portugal) Ricardo Fernandes
- (Portugal) Rui Duarte
- (Portugal) Filipe Teixeira
- (Portugal) João Paulo Andrade

Slovakia

- (Slovakia) Jakub Hromada

Slovenia

- (Slovenia) Darijan Matić

Serbia

- (Serbia) Ranko Despotović

Spain

- (Spain) Joan Oriol
- (Spain) Borja Valle

Romania-Hungary

- (Romania) (Hungary) Stefan Auer
- (Romania) (Hungary) Iuliu Baratky

Hungary-Yugoslavia

- (Hungary) (Socialist Federal Republic of Yugoslavia) Vilmos Sipos

== Notable former managers ==
- (Romania) (Hungary) Stefan Auer
- (Romania) (Hungary) Iuliu Baratky
- (Italy) Cristiano Bergodi
- (Romania) Viorel Hizo
- (Romania) Viorel Kraus
- (Northern Ireland) Neil Lennon
- (Romania) Mircea Lucescu
- (Romania) Răzvan Lucescu
- (Romania) Nicolae Lupescu
- (Romania) Bazil Marian
- (Romania) Nicolae Manea
- (Romania) Ion Motroc
- (Romania) Daniel Pancu
- (Romania) Mircea Rădulescu
- (Romania) Mircea Rednic
- (Romania) Ferenc Rónay
- (Hungary) Alfréd Schaffer
- (Romania) Valentin Stănescu
- (Romania) Petre Steinbach
- (Romania) Marius Șumudică
