= Grigore Grigoriu (footballer) =

Romanian footballer

Personal information
- Date of birth: 1899
- Place of birth: Romania
- Date of death: after 1975
- Position: Midfielder

Senior career*
Years	Team	Apps	(Gls)
1918–1923	Venus București		
1923–1925	Rapid București		
1925–1929	Juventus București	39	(3)
1930	Rapid București		
- * Club domestic league appearances and goals

Grigore Grigoriu (1899 – after 1975) was a Romanian football player.

Grigoriu was the first team captain of Rapid București and one of its founders. He had previously played for Venus București (1918–1923). The team's first jerseys were made in his house by hand by the wife of another Rapid founder Geza Ginzer, who chose the burgundy color instead of white because it was easier for her to wash it.

Grigoriu only played for two years for Rapid, before leaving for a wealthier team, Juventus București, in 1925. Although he felt bad to leave the team he helped be created, he was allowed to leave for a more prestigious team of the time.

== Honours ==
Venus București

- Divizia A: 1919–20, 1920–21
