= 1964–66 Balkans Cup =

Tournament details
- Country: Balkans
- Teams: 8

Final positions
- Champions: (Romania) Rapid București
- Runners-up: (Romania) Farul Constanța

Tournament statistics
- Matches played: 26
- Goals scored: 70 (2.69 per match)

The 1964–66 Balkans Cup was an edition of the Balkans Cup, a football competition for representative clubs from the Balkan states. It was contested by 8 teams and Rapid București won the trophy.

== Group Stage ==
=== Group A ===
Pos	Team	Pld	W	D	L	GF	GA	GR	Pts	Qualification
1	(Romania) Farul Constanța (A)	6	4	1	1	10	2	5.000	9	Advances to finals
2	(Greece) Olympiacos	6	4	1	1	10	8	1.250	9	
3	(Bulgaria) Spartak Plovdiv	6	2	1	3	11	9	1.222	5	
4	(Socialist Federal Republic of Yugoslavia) FK Vardar	6	0	1	5	3	15	0.200	1	

Source: rsssf.com
Rules for classification: 1) points; 2) goal average; 3) number of goals scored
(A) Advance to a further round
10 March 1965

Olympiacos (Greece)	3–1	(Bulgaria) Spartak Plovdiv
Vasiliou 34'; Papazoglou 58'; Botinos 66'		Velev 13'

Karaiskakis, Piraeus

14 March 1965

Spartak Plovdiv (Bulgaria)	2–3	(Greece) Olympiacos

Karaiskakis, Piraeus

28 April 1965

Spartak Plovdiv (Bulgaria)	1–1	(Romania) Farul Constanța

Spartak, Plovdiv

12 May 1965

Farul Constanța (Romania)	1–0	(Bulgaria) Spartak Plovdiv

Farul, Constanța

2 June 1965

Spartak Plovdiv (Bulgaria)	4–1	(Socialist Federal Republic of Yugoslavia) FK Vardar

Spartak, Plovdiv

16 June 1965

FK Vardar (Socialist Federal Republic of Yugoslavia)	0–4	(Romania) Farul Constanța

Gradski, Skopje

23 June 1965

Farul Constanța (Romania)	1–0	(Socialist Federal Republic of Yugoslavia) FK Vardar

Farul, Constanța

30 June 1965

FK Vardar (Socialist Federal Republic of Yugoslavia)	0–3	(Bulgaria) Spartak Plovdiv

Gradski, Skopje

5 September 1965

Olympiacos (Greece)	1–0	(Socialist Federal Republic of Yugoslavia) FK Vardar
Vasiliou 48'

Karaiskakis, Piraeus

19 September 1965

FK Vardar (Socialist Federal Republic of Yugoslavia)	2–2	(Greece) Olympiacos
Pecovski 60'; Milissis 73' (o.g.)		Dermatis 8', 70'

Gradski, Skopje

20 October 1965

Olympiacos (Greece)	1–0	(Romania) Farul Constanța

Karaiskakis, Piraeus

1 June 1966

Farul Constanța (Romania)	3–0	(Greece) Olympiacos

Farul, Constanța

=== Group B ===
Pos	Team	Pld	W	D	L	GF	GA	GR	Pts	Qualification
1	(Romania) Rapid București (A)	6	5	0	1	14	5	2.800	10	Advances to finals
2	(Bulgaria) Cherno More Varna	6	3	2	1	7	4	1.750	8	
3	(Albania) 17 Nëntori Tirana	6	1	2	3	5	7	0.714	4	
4	(Turkey) Beşiktaş	6	0	2	4	2	12	0.167	2	

Source: rsssf.com
Rules for classification: 1) points; 2) goal average; 3) number of goals scored
(A) Advance to a further round
16 December 1964

17 Nëntori Tirana (Albania)	0–0	(Bulgaria) Cherno More Varna

Qemal Stafa, Tirana

1965

Rapid București (Romania)	3–0 Awarded	(Turkey) Beşiktaş

Rapid, Bucharest

7 April 1965

Rapid București (Romania)	2–0	(Bulgaria) Cherno More Varna
Ionescu 17'; Codreanu 36'

23rd August, Bucharest

9 May 1965

Beşiktaş (Turkey)	1–1	(Bulgaria) Cherno More Varna
Arbay 61'		Genov 51'

Mithat Paşa Stadium, Istanbul

26 May 1965

Cherno More Varna (Bulgaria)	1–0	(Albania) 17 Nëntori Tirana
Atanasov 82'

Yuri Gagarin, Varna
Attendance: 12,000

2 June 1965

Beşiktaş (Turkey)	1–1	(Albania) 17 Nëntori Tirana
Ehlidil 56'		Pavlo 24'

Mithat Paşa Stadium, Istanbul

23 June 1965

Cherno More Varna (Bulgaria)	3–1	(Romania) Rapid București
N. Dimitrov 3'; Bogomilov 51'; N. Dimitrov 62'		Dumitriu 65'

Yuri Gagarin, Varna

14 July 1965

Rapid București (Romania)	3–1	(Albania) 17 Nëntori Tirana

Rapid, Bucharest

27 October 1965

Beşiktaş (Turkey)	0–3 Awarded	(Romania) Rapid București

Mithat Paşa Stadium, Istanbul

20 November 1965

Cherno More Varna (Bulgaria)	2–0	(Turkey) Beşiktaş
Bilyalov 18'; Stoyanov 51'

Yuri Gagarin, Varna

26 November 1965

17 Nëntori Tirana (Albania)	2–0	(Turkey) Beşiktaş
Flaçer 16'; Gaçka 55'

Dinamo, Tirana

19 May 1966

17 Nëntori Tirana (Albania)	1–2	(Romania) Rapid București

Dinamo, Tirana

== Final ==
Team 1	Agg.	Team 2	1st leg	2nd leg
Rapid București (Romania)	5–3	(Romania) Farul Constanța	3–3	2–0

=== First leg ===
17 July 1966

Rapid București (Romania)	3–3	(Romania) Farul Constanța

Rapid, Bucharest

=== Second leg ===
21 July 1966

Farul Constanța (Romania)	0–2	(Romania) Rapid București

Farul, Constanța

Rapid București won 5–3 on aggregate.
