= Ion Mihăilescu =

Romanian footballer

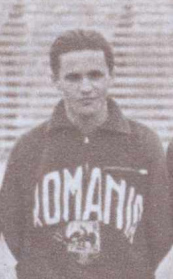
- Mihăilescu in 1940

Personal information
- Date of birth: 27 March 1916
- Place of birth: Fetești, Romania
- Date of death: Unknown
- Positions: Midfielder; defender

Senior career*
Years	Team	Apps	(Gls)
1934–1938	Tricolor Venus Călărași		
1938–1944	Sportul Studențesc București (Note: The Divizia A 1940–41 was the last season before World War II and the Divizia A 1946–47 was the first one after, so the appearances and goals scored during this period for Sportul Studențesc București are not official.)	60	(11)
1945–1951	Locomotiva București (Note: The Divizia A 1940–41 was the last season before World War II and the Divizia A 1946–47 was the first one after, so the appearances and goals scored during this period for Locomotiva București are not official with the exception of the 1945–46 regional championship.)	119	(7)
1951	Locomotiva Timișoara	11	(0)
Total		190	(18)

International career
1940–1950	Romania	15	(0)

Managerial career
- 1949: Romania
- 1960–1962: Rapid București
- 1964–1965: Farul Constanța
- * Club domestic league appearances and goals

Ion Mihăilescu (born 27 March 1916; date of death unknown) was a Romanian footballer and manager.

== International career ==
Ion Mihăilescu played 15 games at international level for Romania, including six matches at the 1947 and 1948 Balkan Cup editions. In 1949, in a friendly against Albania which ended with a 4–1 victory, Mihăilescu was the team's captain and coach.

== Honours ==
=== Player ===
Sportul Studențesc București

- Cupa României runner-up: 1938–39

=== Manager ===
Rapid București

- Cupa României runner-up: 1960–61, 1961–62
