= List of Romania international footballers =

This is a list of Romanian international footballers who have played for Romania's national team, ranked by their number of caps. 910 players have played for the team since its first match in 1922. Some sources show that more players played for the national team. This is because, in 2007, after a recommendation from FIFA, the Romanian Football Federation decided to erase 33 matches played between 1959 and 1984 from the national team's records. Those matches now belong to Romania's Olympic team records.

== 20 caps or more ==
Key

- GK – Goalkeeper
- DF – Defender
- MF – Midfielder
- FW – Forward
- **Bold** – currently available for selection.
- * – member of the 1994 FIFA World Cup Golden Team.

Only players with 20 or more official caps are included. The caps for Romania's Olympic team during 1959–2020 are not included. The table is up to date as of 17 November 2026.

#	Name	Position	National team career	Caps	Goals	WC	EC	OG	Ref
1	Dorinel Munteanu *	MF	1991–2007	134	16	1994, 1998	1996, 2000		
2	Gheorghe Hagi *	MF	1983–2000	124	35	1990, 1994, 1998	1984, 1996, 2000		
3	Gheorghe Popescu *	DF	1988–2003	115	16	1990, 1994, 1998	1996, 2000		
4	Răzvan Raț	DF	2002–2018	113	2		2008, 2016		
5	László Bölöni	MF	1975–1988	102	23		1984		
6	Dan Petrescu *	DF	1989–2000	95	12	1994, 1998	1996, 2000		
7	Bogdan Stelea *	GK	1988–2005	91	0	1990, 1994, 1998	1996, 2000		
8	**Nicolae Stanciu**	MF	2016–	90	15		2016, 2024		
9	Michael Klein	DF	1981–1991	89	5	1990	1984		
10	Bogdan Lobonț	GK	1998–2018	86	0		2000, 2008		
11	Mircea Rednic	DF	1981–1991	83	2	1990	1984		
11	Marius Lăcătuș	FW	1984–1998	83	13	1990, 1998	1996		
13	**Răzvan Marin**	MF	2016–	79	12		2024		
14	Vlad Chiricheș	DF	2011–2025	78	0		2016		
15	Adrian Mutu	FW	2000–2013	77	35		2000, 2008		
16	Silviu Lung	GK	1979–1993	76	0	1990	1984		
17	Cristian Chivu	DF	1999–2011	75	3		2000, 2008		
18	Ioan Lupescu *	MF	1988–2000	74	6	1990, 1994	1996, 2000		
19	Rodion Cămătaru	FW	1978–1990	73	21	1990	1984		
19	Cosmin Contra	DF	1996–2010	73	7		2000, 2008		
19	Ciprian Tătărușanu	GK	2010–2020	73	0		2016		
22	Ciprian Marica	FW	2003–2014	71	25		2008		
23	Viorel Moldovan *	FW	1993–2005	70	25	1994, 1998	1996, 2000		
24	Constantin Gâlcă *	DF	1993–2005	68	4	1994, 1998	1996, 2000		
25	Cornel Dinu	DF	1968–1981	67	3	1970			
25	Mirel Rădoi	DF	2000–2010	67	1		2008		
25	Gabriel Tamaș	DF	2003–2018	67	3		2008		
28	Ilie Balaci	DF	1974–1986	65	8				
29	Mircea Lucescu	FW	1966–1979	64	9	1970			
29	Costică Ștefănescu	DF	1977–1985	64	0		1984		
31	Ilie Dumitrescu*	FW	1989–1998	61	20	1990, 1994, 1998			
32	Dorin Goian	DF	2005–2014	60	5		2008		
33	**Ianis Hagi**	MF	2018–	59	8		2024		
34	Anghel Iordănescu	FW	1971–1981	57	21				
34	Gabriel Torje	MF	2010–2017	57	12		2016		
36	Necula Răducanu	GK	1967–1978	56	0	1970			
36	Nicolae Ungureanu	DF	1981–1989	56	1		1984		
36	Dorin Mateuț	DF	1984–1991	56	10	1990			
36	**Nicușor Bancu**	DF	2017–	56	2		2024		
40	Ioan Andone	DF	1981–1990	55	2	1990	1984		
40	Miodrag Belodedici *	DF	1984–2000	55	5	1994	1996, 2000		
40	Ioan Sabău	MF	1988–2001	55	8	1990	1996		
40	Adrian Ilie	FW	1993–2005	55	13	1998	1996, 2000		
40	Alexandru Maxim	MF	2012–2022	55	6				
45	Daniel Prodan *	DF	1993–2001	54	1	1994	1996		
45	Florentin Petre	MF	1998–2009	54	6		2000, 2008		
47	Iulian Filipescu	DF	1996–2003	52	1	1998	1996, 2000		
47	Bogdan Stancu	FW	2009–2017	52	14		2016		
49	Ion Dumitru	MF	1969–1980	50	10	1970			
49	Răzvan Cociș	MF	2005–2017	50	2		2008		
49	**Alexandru Chipciu**	MF	2011–	50	6		2016		
49	**Dennis Man**	MF	2018–	50	13		2024		
53	Iuliu Bodola	FW	1931–1939	48	30	1934, 1938			
54	Gino Iorgulescu	DF	1974–1986	47	3		1984		
54	Claudiu Keșerü	FW	2013–2021	47	13		2016		
54	**Andrei Burcă**	DF	2019–	47	1		2024		
57	Nicolae Dobrin	MF	1966–1978	46	6	1970			
57	Ștefan Sameș	DF	1973–1982	46	3				
57	Tibor Selymes *	MF	1992–1999	46	0	1994, 1998	1996		
57	**George Pușcaș**	FW	2018–	46	11		2024		
61	Ionel Ganea	FW	1998–2006	45	19		2000		
61	**Denis Alibec**	FW	2015–	45	6		2024		
63	Paul Codrea	DF	2000–2010	44	1		2008		
63	Marius Niculae	FW	2000–2013	44	15		2008		
65	Mihai Pintilii	MF	2011–2018	43	1		2016		
65	**Andrei Rațiu**	DF	2021–	43	2		2024	2020	
65	**Alexandru Cicâldău**	MF	2018–	43	6		2024		
68	Gheorghe Albu	DF	1931–1938	42	0	1934			
68	Lajos Sătmăreanu	DF	1967–1973	42	1	1970			
68	Aurel Țicleanu	MF	1979–1986	42	3		1984		
71	Ștefan Dobay	FW	1930–1939	41	20	1934, 1938			
71	Zoltan Crișan	FW	1974–1984	41	4				
73	Radu Nunweiller	MF	1966–1975	40	2	1970			
73	Dudu Georgescu	FW	1973–1984	40	21				
73	Florin Prunea *	GK	1990–2001	40	0	1994, 1998	1996, 2000		
73	Florin Răducioiu *	FW	1992–2000	40	21	1990, 1994	1996		
73	Cristian Tănase	MF	2008–2015	40	6				
73	**Valentin Mihăilă**	MF	2021–	40	5		2024		
79	Daniel Niculae	FW	2003–2012	39	9		2008		
80	Dumitru Moraru	GK	1975–1988	38	0		1984		
80	Laurențiu Roșu	MF	1998–2007	38	5		2000		
80	Dragoș Grigore	DF	2011–2020	38	1		2016		
83	Bănel Nicoliță	MF	2005–2014	37	1		2008		
84	Nicolae Kovács	FW	1929–1938	36	6	1930, 1934, 1938			
84	Marcel Coraș	FW	1982–1988	36	6		1984		
84	Cristian Săpunaru	DF	2008–2019	36	0		2008, 2016		
84	**Marius Marin**	MF	2021–	36	0		2024	2020	
88	Romulus Gabor	FW	1981–1986	35	2		1984		
89	Rudolf Bürger	DF	1929–1939	34	0	1930, 1934, 1938			
89	Vasile Gergely	MF	1962–1970	34	2	1970			
89	Ionel Augustin	FW	1978–1986	34	3		1984		
89	Gabi Balint	FW	1982–1992	34	14	1990			
89	Ștefan Iovan	DF	1983–2000	34	3				
89	**Radu Drăgușin**	DF	2022–	34	1		2024		
95	József Pecsovszky	MF	1945–1958	32	11			1952	
95	Liviu Ciobotariu	DF	1997–2001	32	3	1998	2000		
95	Nicolae Dică	MF	2003–2010	32	9		2008		
98	Mihai Mocanu	DF	1966–1971	31	0	1970			
98	Florea Dumitrache	FW	1968–1974	31	15	1970			
98	Gheorghe Mihali *	DF	1991–1996	31	0	1994	1996		
98	Costin Lazăr	MF	2005–2014	31	2				
98	Gheorghe Grozav	FW	2012–2019	31	5				
98	Florin Niță	GK	2017–2025	31	0		2024		
104	Emil Săndoi	DF	1987–1993	30	0	1990			
104	Adrian Iencsi	DF	2000–2006	30	1				
104	Ovidiu Hoban	MF	2013–2017	30	1		2016		
104	Alin Toșca	DF	2016–2022	30	1				
104	**Florin Tănase**	MF	2014–	30	5				
104	**Darius Olaru**	MF	2021–	30	0		2024		
110	Emerich Vogl	DF	1924–1934	29	1	1930, 1934			
110	Dan Coe	DF	1963–1971	29	2	1970		1964	
110	Florin Cheran	DF	1974–1978	29	0				
113	Gheorghe Băcuț	MF	1945–1956	28	1				
113	Alexandru Sătmăreanu	DF	1974–1978	28	0				
113	Ion Vlădoiu *	FW	1992–2000	28	2	1994	1996		
113	**Denis Drăguș**	FW	2018–	28	7		2024		
117	Silviu Bindea	FW	1932–1942	27	11	1934, 1938			
117	Cornel Popa	DF	1958–1967	27	0				
117	Nicolae Negrilă	DF	1980–1987	27	1		1984		
117	Daniel Pancu	FW	2001–2005	27	9				
117	Costel Pantilimon	GK	2008–2017	27	0		2016		
117	**Ionuț Nedelcearu**	DF	2018–	27	2		2024		
123	Ion Nunweiller	DF	1958–1967	26	1			1964	
123	Ion Pârcălab	FW	1961–1968	26	3				
123	Emerich Dembrovschi	FW	1968–1973	26	8	1970			
123	Gheorghe Bucur	FW	2005–2013	26	4				
123	Alexandru Bourceanu	MF	2009–2014	26	0				
123	Ciprian Deac	MF	2010–2020	26	4				
123	Alexandru Mitriță	MF	2018–2025	26	4				
123	**Cristian Manea**	DF	2014–	26	2				
131	Vintilă Cossini	MF	1935–1941	25	0	1938			
131	Augustin Deleanu	DF	1966–1973	25	0	1970			
131	Iosif Rotariu	MF	1988–1997	25	1	1990			
131	Gheorghe Craioveanu	FW	1993–1999	25	4	1998			
131	Florin Andone	FW	2015–2020	25	2		2016		
131	**Deian Sorescu**	MF	2021–	25	0		2024		
137	Gheorghe Ciolac	FW	1928–1937	24	13	1934			
137	**Florinel Coman**	MF	2019–	24	3		2024		
139	Grațian Sepi	FW	1928–1937	23	14	1934			
139	Vasile Iordache	GK	1976–1984	23	0		1984		
139	Ion Munteanu	DF	1979–1984	23	0				
139	Ion Geolgău	MF	1980–1988	23	3				
139	Anton Doboș	DF	1993–1998	23	1	1998	1996		
139	Ovidiu Stîngă	MF	1993–1999	23	0	1994, 1998	1996		
139	Ovidiu Petre	MF	2002–2009	23	1				
139	**Adrian Rus**	DF	2019–	23	2		2024		
147	Alexandru Apolzan	DF	1949–1960	22	0				
147	Titus Ozon	FW	1952–1962	22	7			1952	
147	Iosif Vigu	DF	1970–1979	22	2				
147	Teodor Anghelini	DF	1974–1979	22	0				
147	Daniel Timofte	MF	1990–1995	22	2	1990			
147	Basarab Panduru	MF	1992–1996	22	1	1994			
147	Florin Șoavă	MF	2000–2006	22	0				
147	Adrian Popa	MF	2012–2017	22	0		2016		
155	Gusztáv Juhász	MF	1934–1940	21	0	1934			
155	Zoltan Farmati	DF	1947–1953	21	0			1952	
155	Nicolae Tătaru	FW	1954–1962	21	2				
155	Nicolae Lupescu	DF	1967–1972	21	2	1970			
155	Tiberiu Ghioane	MF	2001–2010	21	2				
155	Lucian Sânmărtean	MF	2003–2016	21	0		2016		
161	László Raffinsky	MF	1929–1938	20	1	1930, 1938			
161	Iuliu Baratky	FW	1933–1940	20	13	1934, 1938			
161	Ion Voinescu	GK	1949–1962	20	0			1952	
161	Vasile Zavoda	DF	1951–1962	20	0			1952	
161	Valeriu Călinoiu	MF	1952–1957	20	1			1952	
161	Gheorghe Constantin	FW	1956–1967	20	6			1964	
161	**Olimpiu Moruțan**	FW	2021–	20	1				

== Players per debut year ==
The caps for Romania's Olympic team during 1959–1984 are not included. The table is up to date as of 17 November 2026.

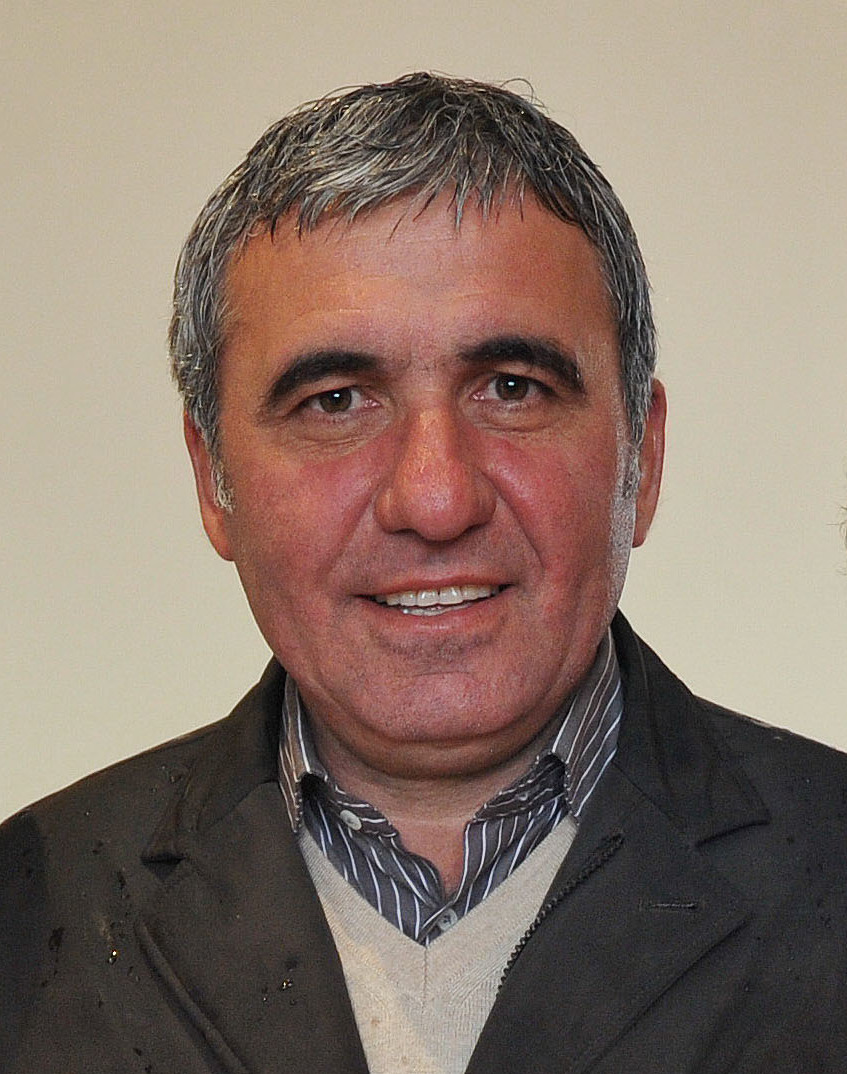
Gheorghe Hagi played in 124 matches and scored 35 goals for Romania, appeared in six final tournaments and won the Romanian Footballer of the Year award a record seven times.

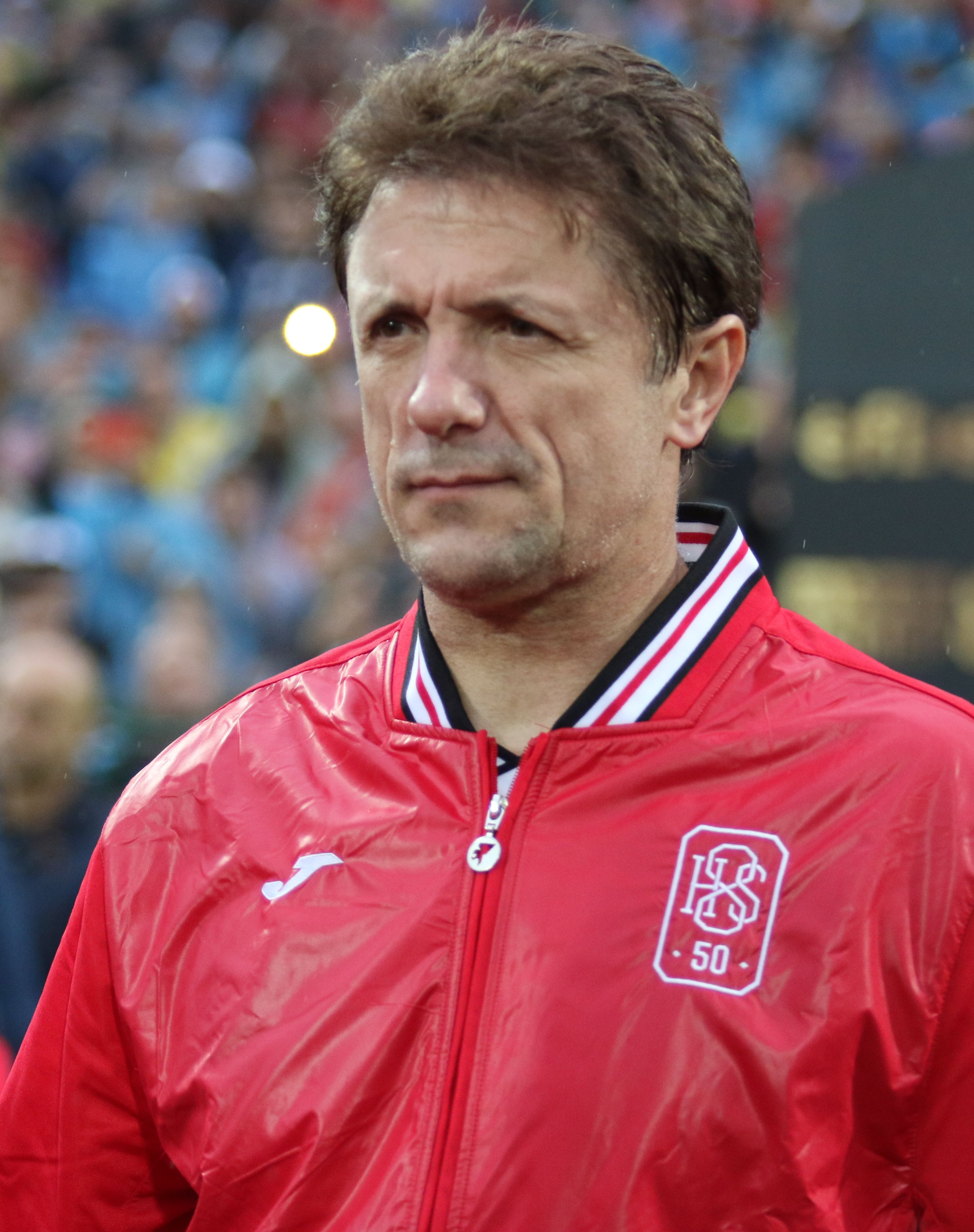
Six times Romanian Footballer of the Year and a member of the Golden Team, Gheorghe Popescu played in five final tournaments.

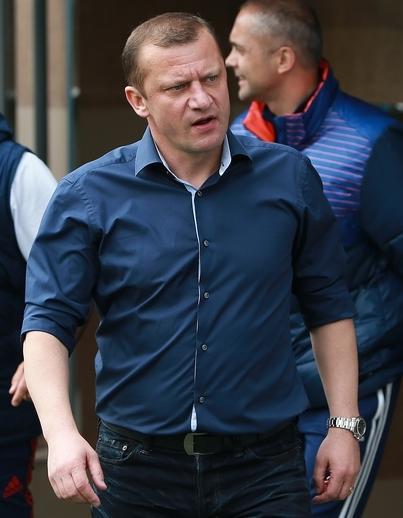
Dorinel Munteanu is the all-time leader in appearances for Romania, with 134 games.

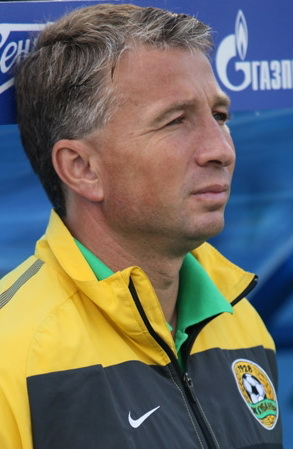
Dan Petrescu played in two World Cups and two European Championships.

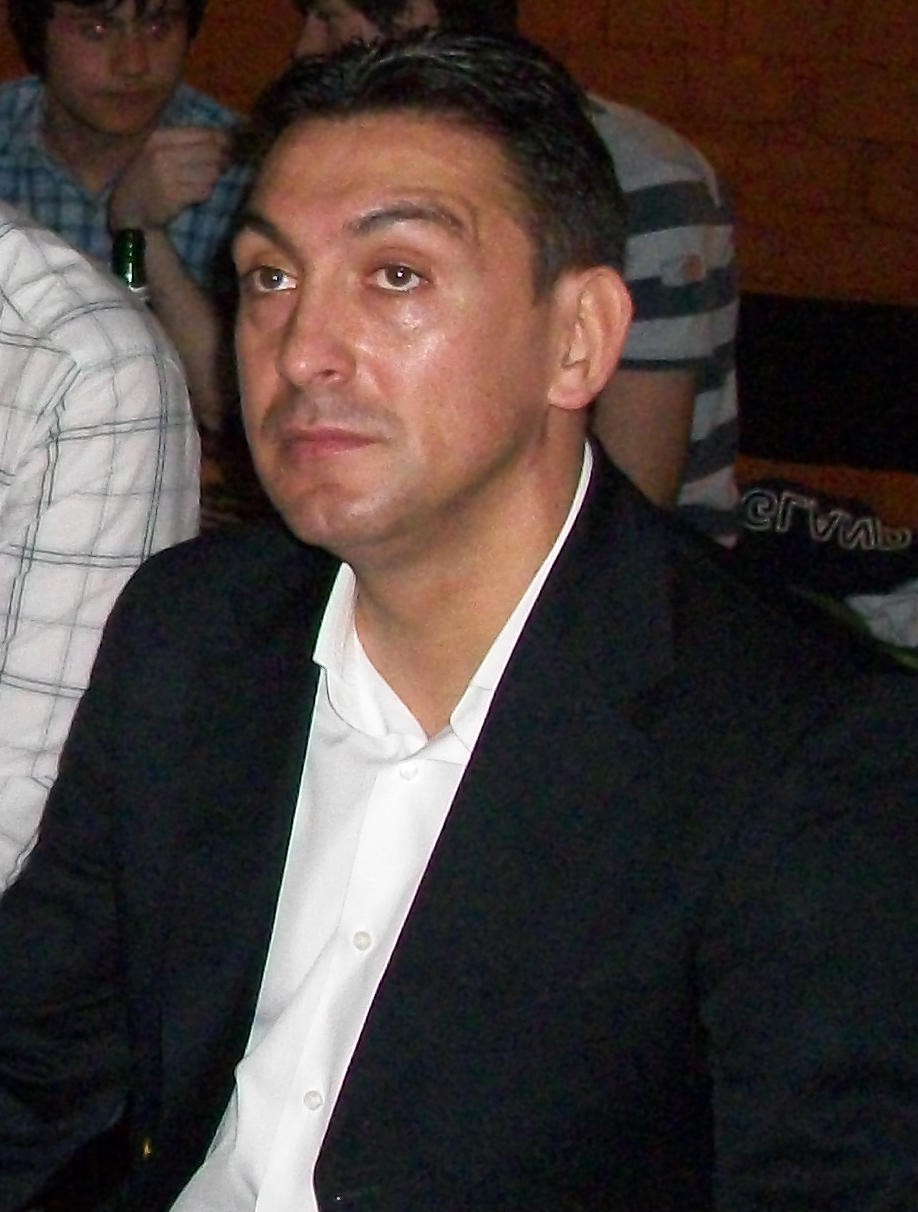
Ilie Dumitrescu scored two goals against Argentina in Romania's round of 16 3–2 victory in the 1994 World Cup.

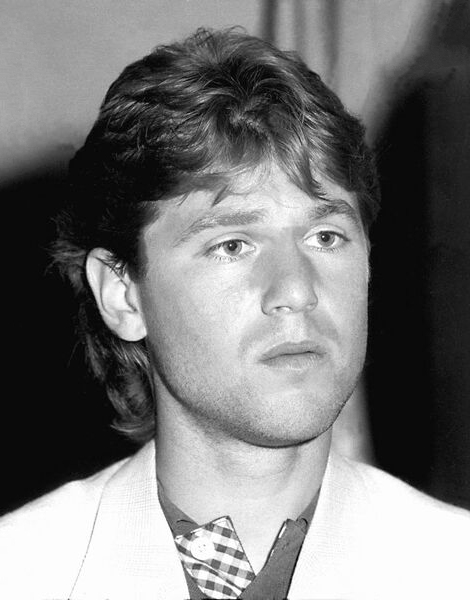
Florin Răducioiu played during the 1994 and 1998 World Cup editions and in Euro 1996.

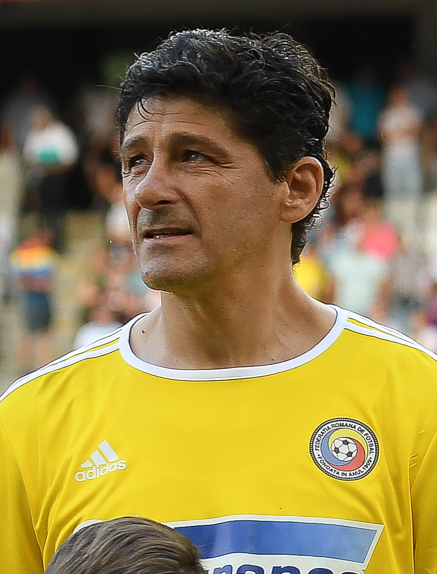
Miodrag Belodedici played in the 1994 World Cup and the 1996 and 2000 editions of the European Championship.

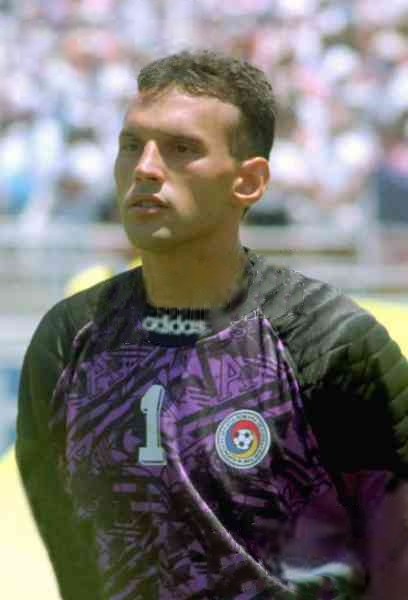
Florin Prunea during the USA 1994 World Cup.

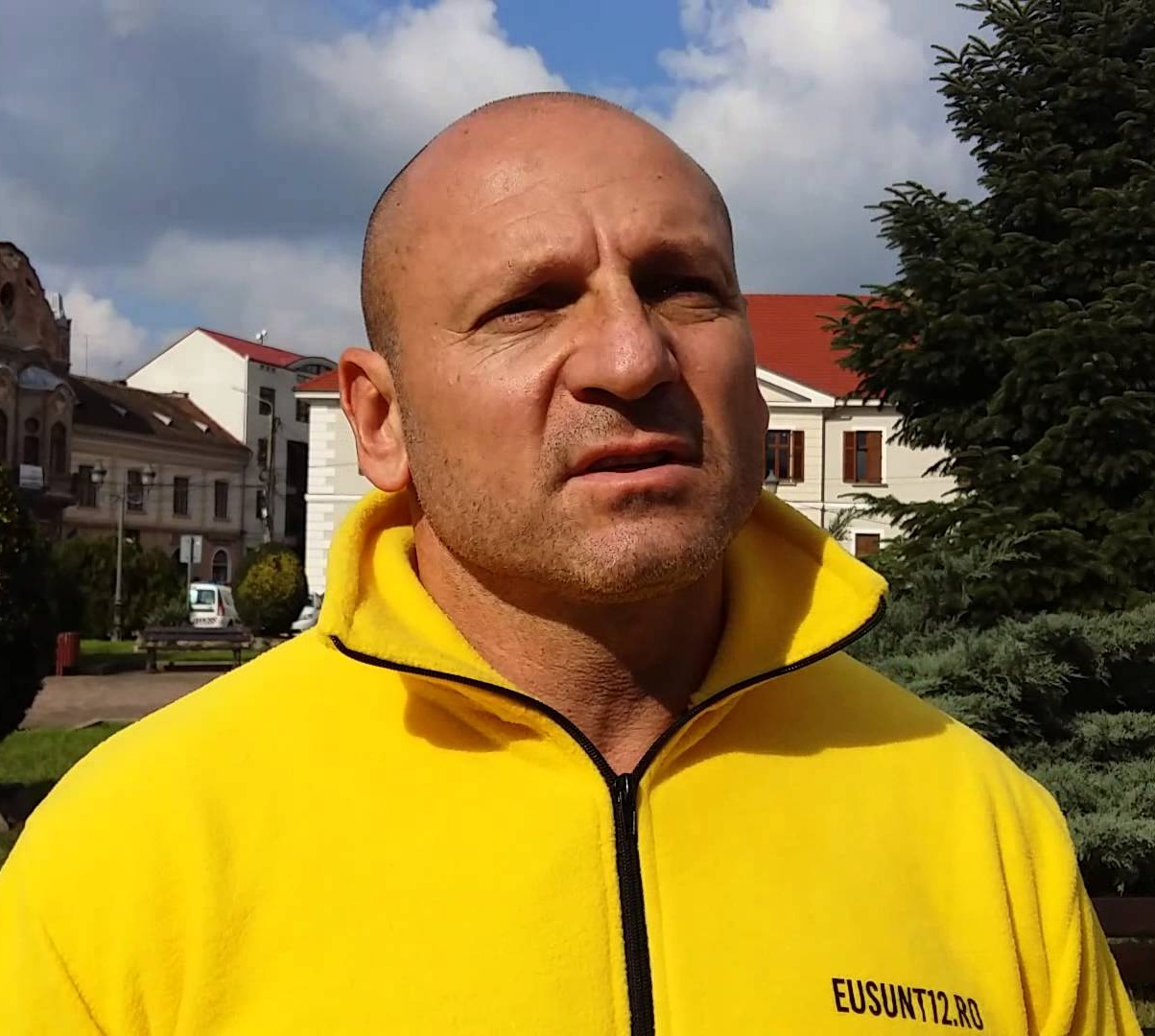
Bogdan Stelea was a member of Romania's squad for three World Cups and two European Championships.

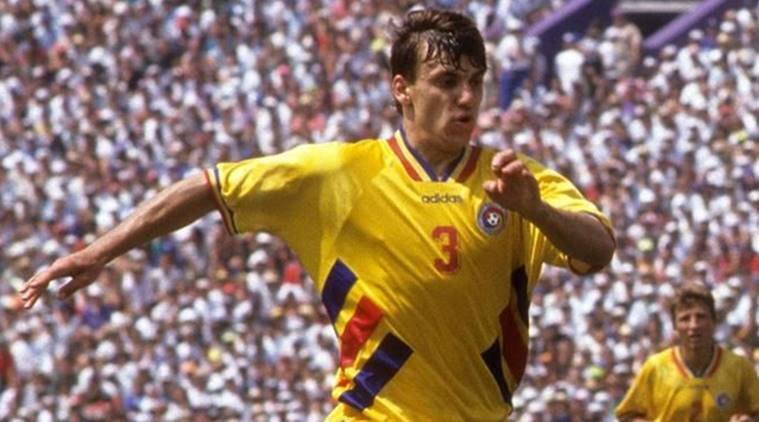
Daniel Prodan playing for Romania during the 1994 World Cup.

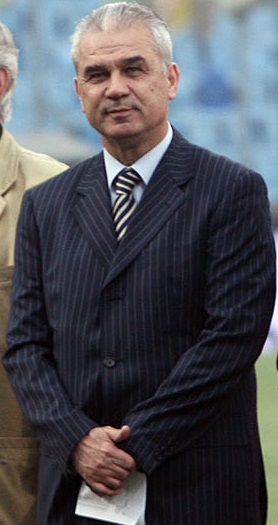
After scoring 21 goals for Romania as a player, Anghel Iordănescu led the country's Golden Team as coach in the 1994 World Cup campaign.

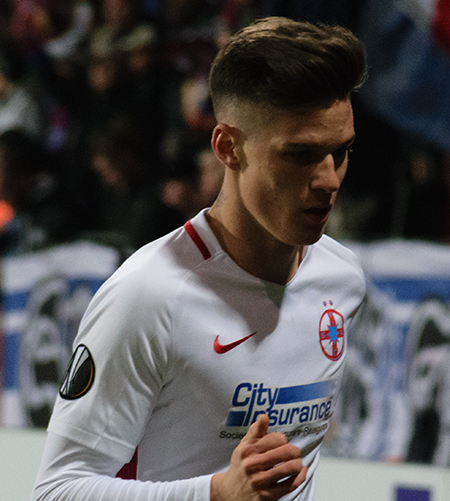
Two-time Romanian Footballer of the Year, Dennis Man, represented Romania during Euro 2024.

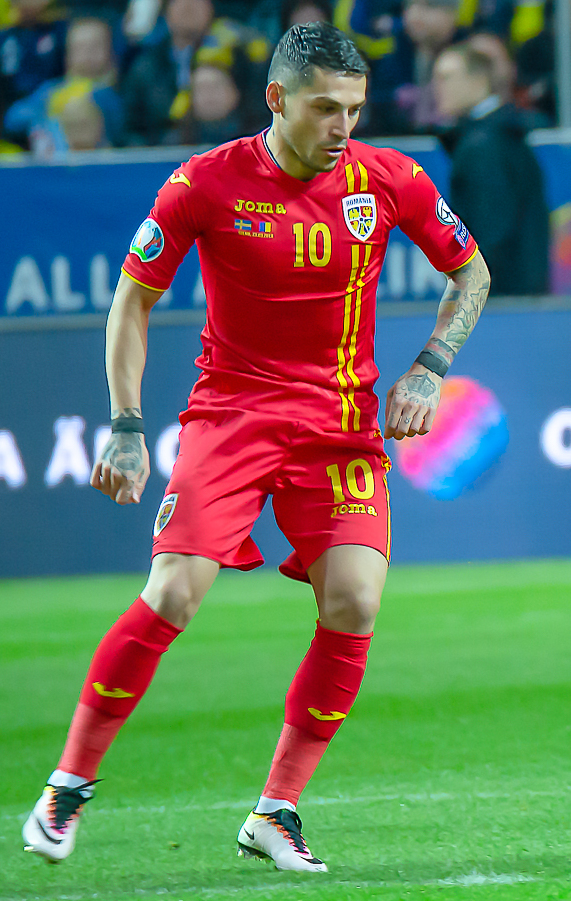
Nicolae Stanciu played for Romania in Euro 2016 and Euro 2024.

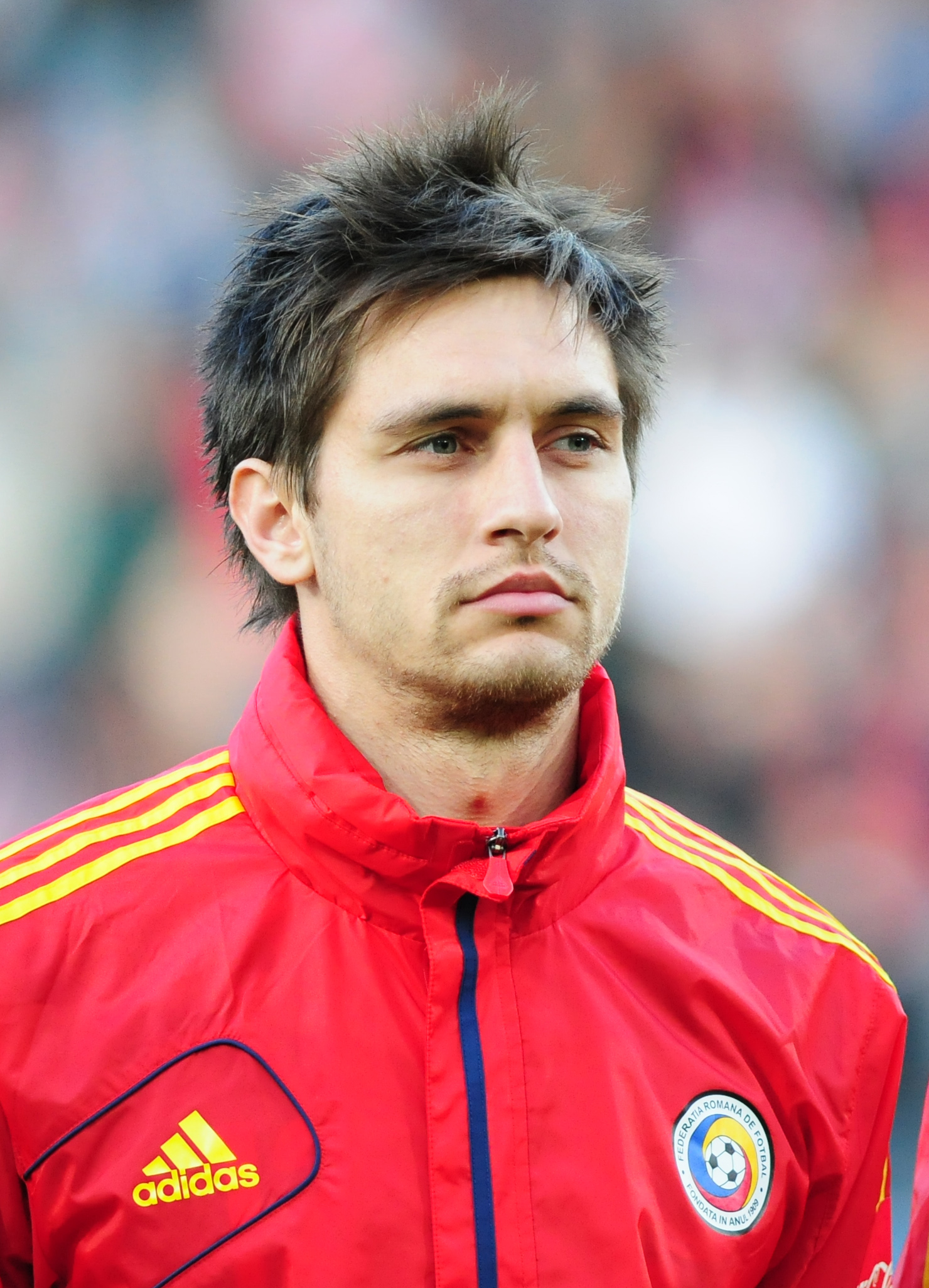
Ciprian Tătărușanu was Romania's goalkeeper during Euro 2016.

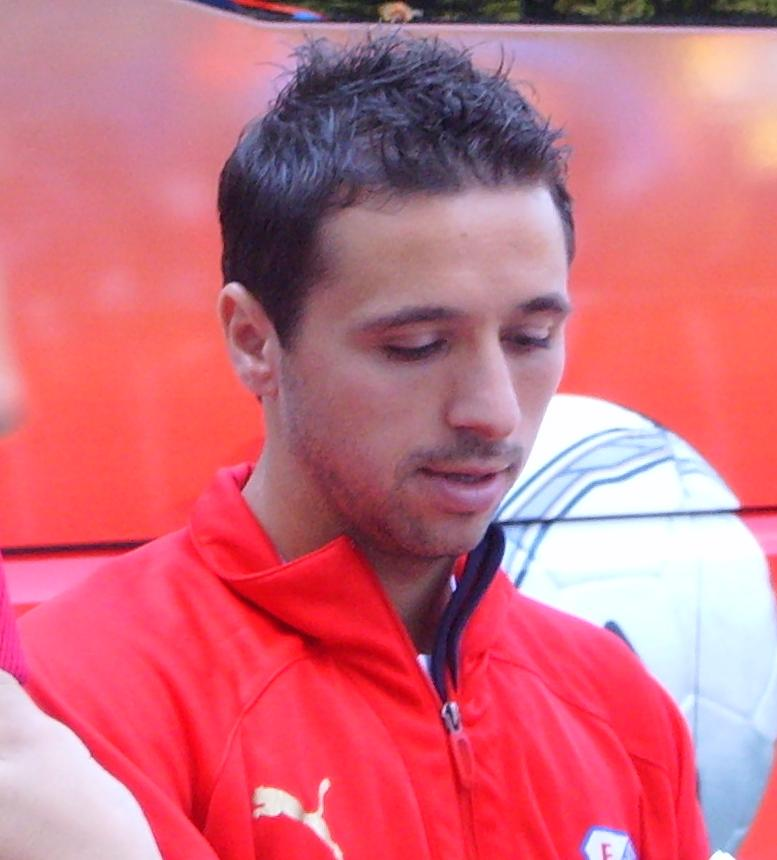
Lucian Sânmărtean played for Romania during Euro 2016.

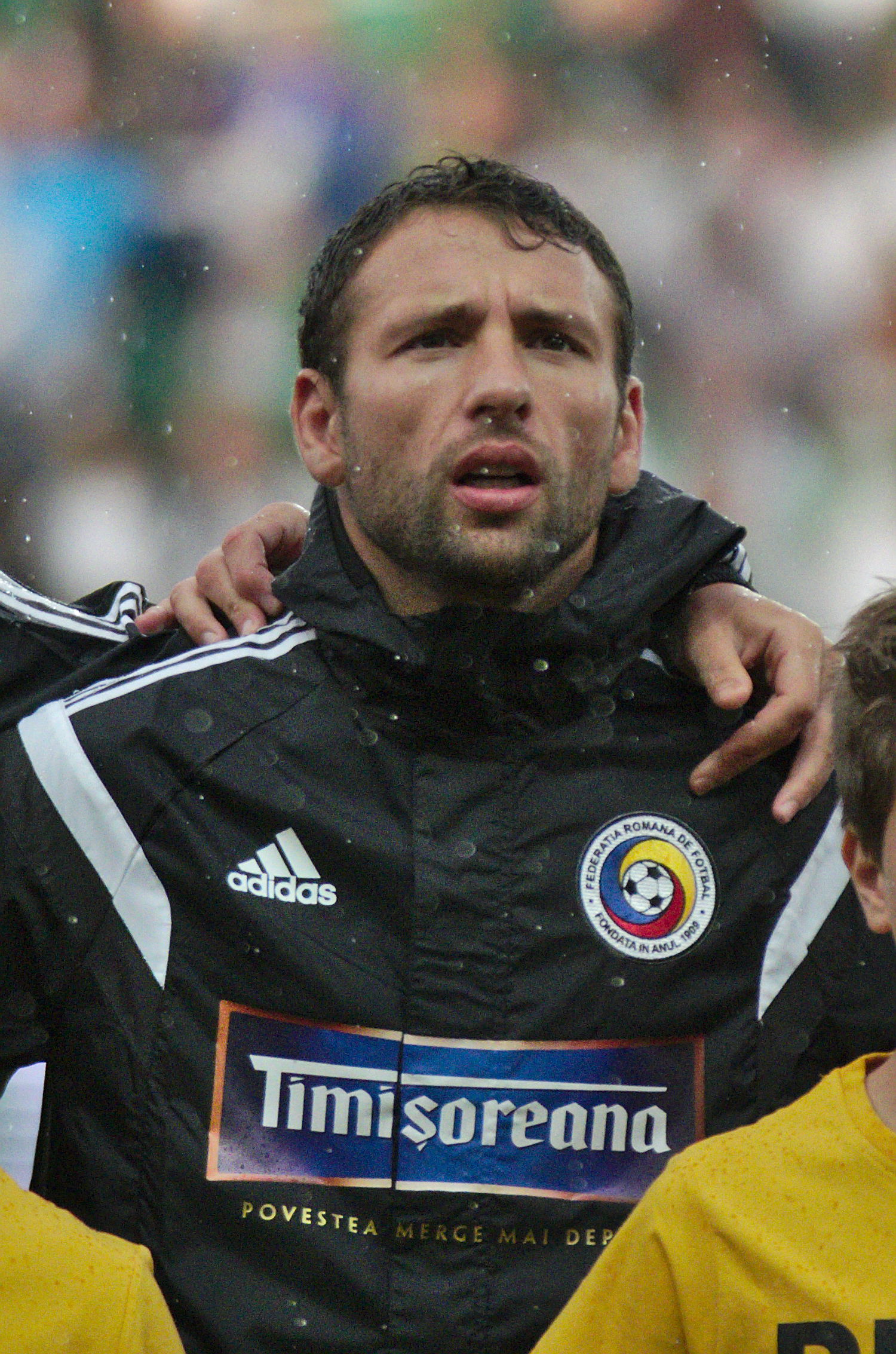
Răzvan Raț made 113 appearances for Romania, including in Euro 2008 and Euro 2016.

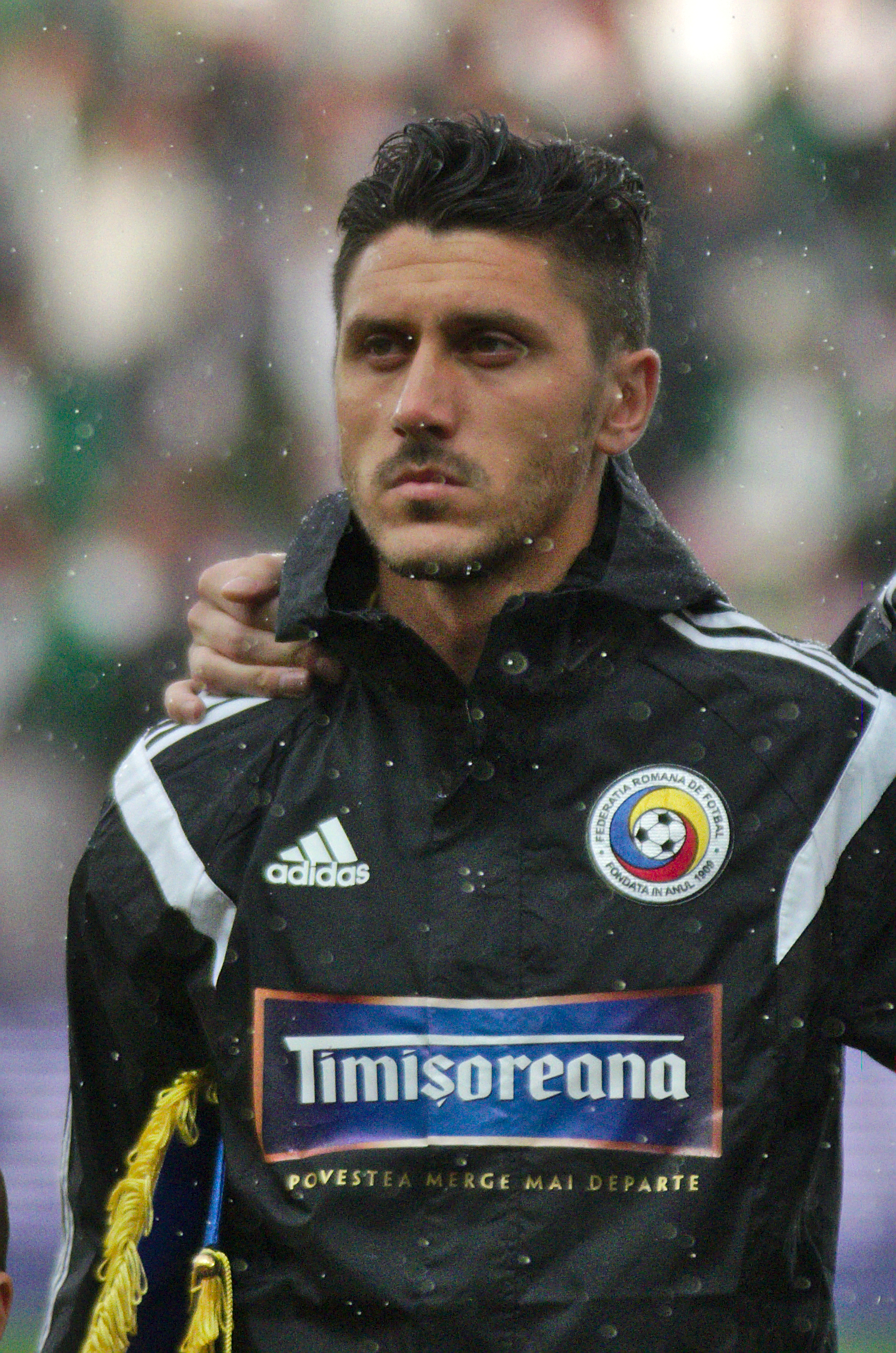
Ciprian Marica scored 25 goals for Romania and was part of the Euro 2008 squad.

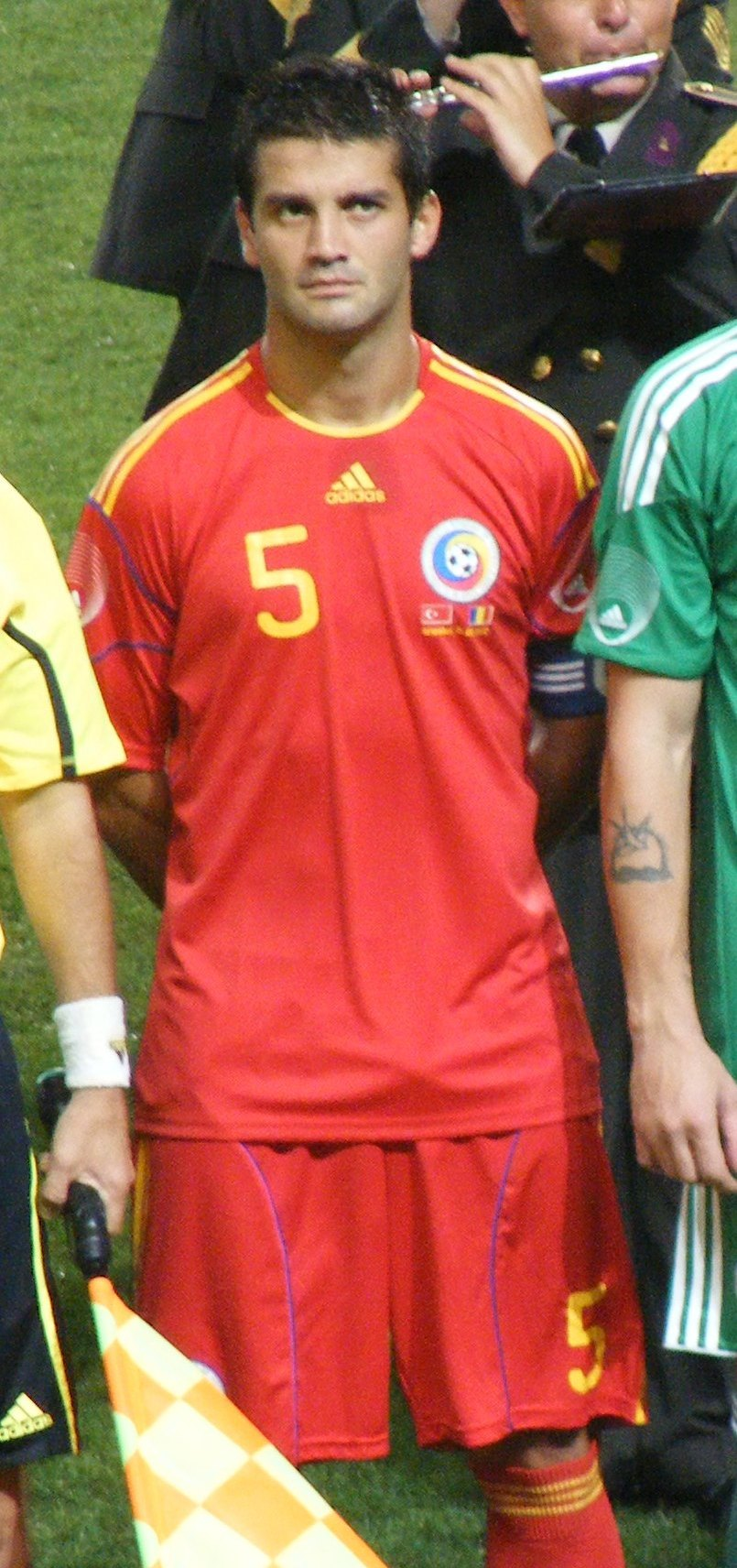
Cristian Chivu, who was named Romanian Footballer of the Year three times, played for Romania in Euro 2000 and captained the team during Euro 2008.

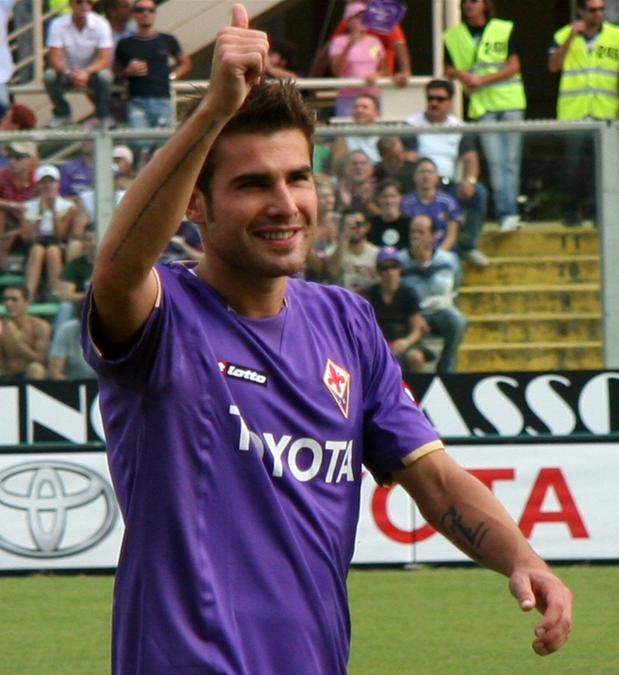
Adrian Mutu is Romania's top-scorer alongside Gheorghe Hagi with 35 goals.

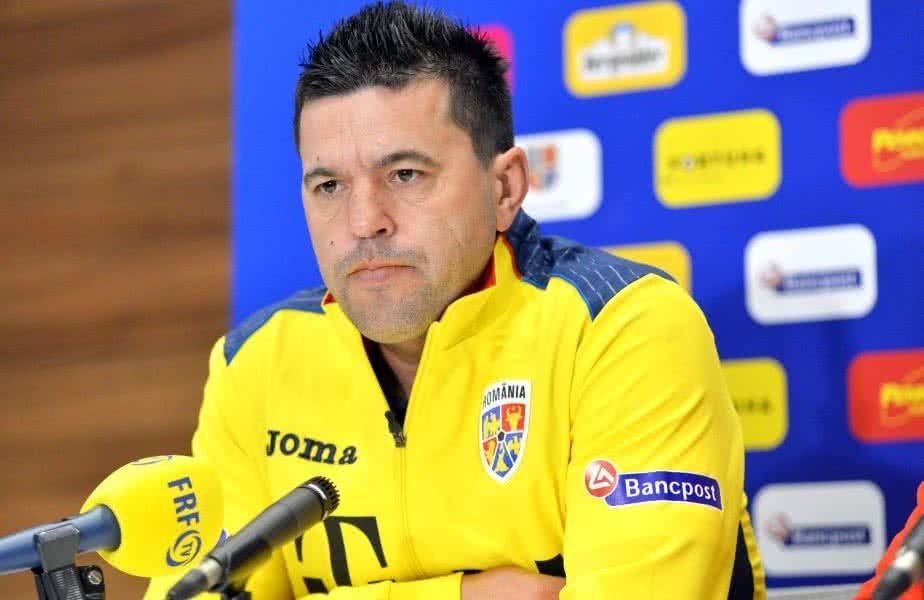
Cosmin Contra played 73 games for Romania, including appearances in Euro 2000 and Euro 2008.

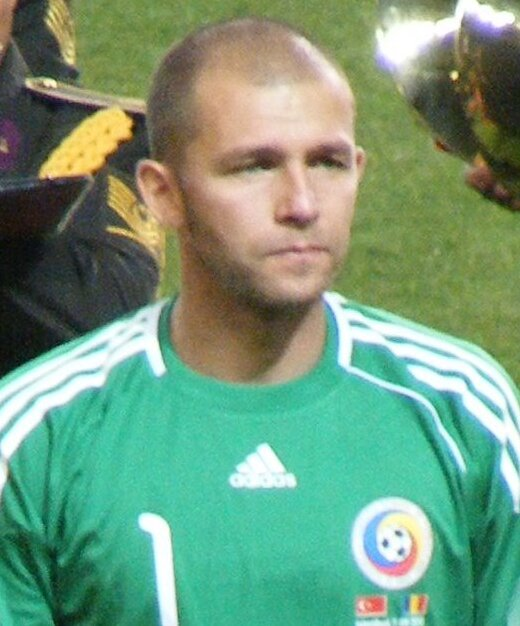
Bogdan Lobonț defended Romania's goal in 86 matches, including three in Euro 2008.

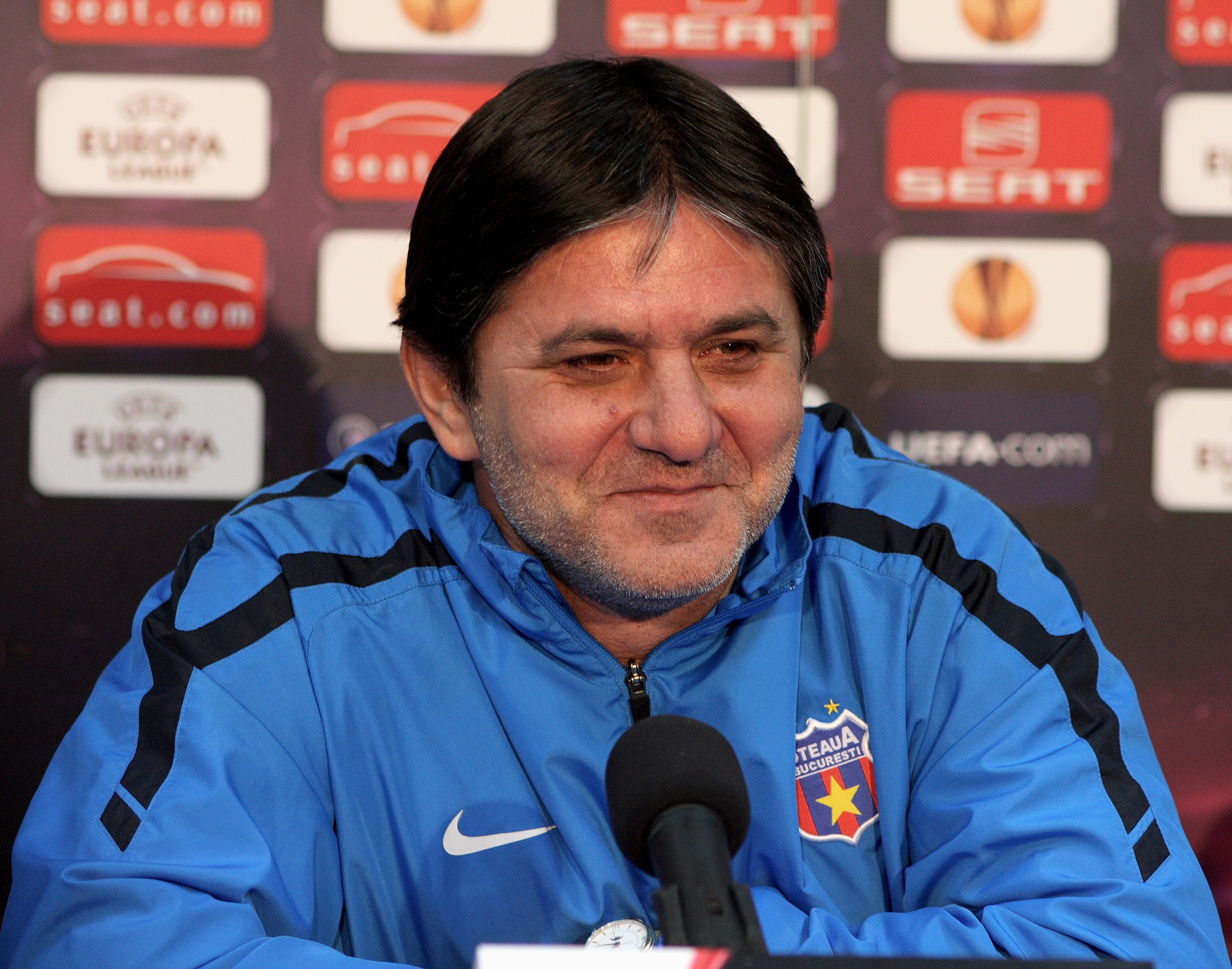
Marius Lăcătuș scored two goals in the 1990 World Cup and also played in Euro 1996 and the 1998 World Cup.

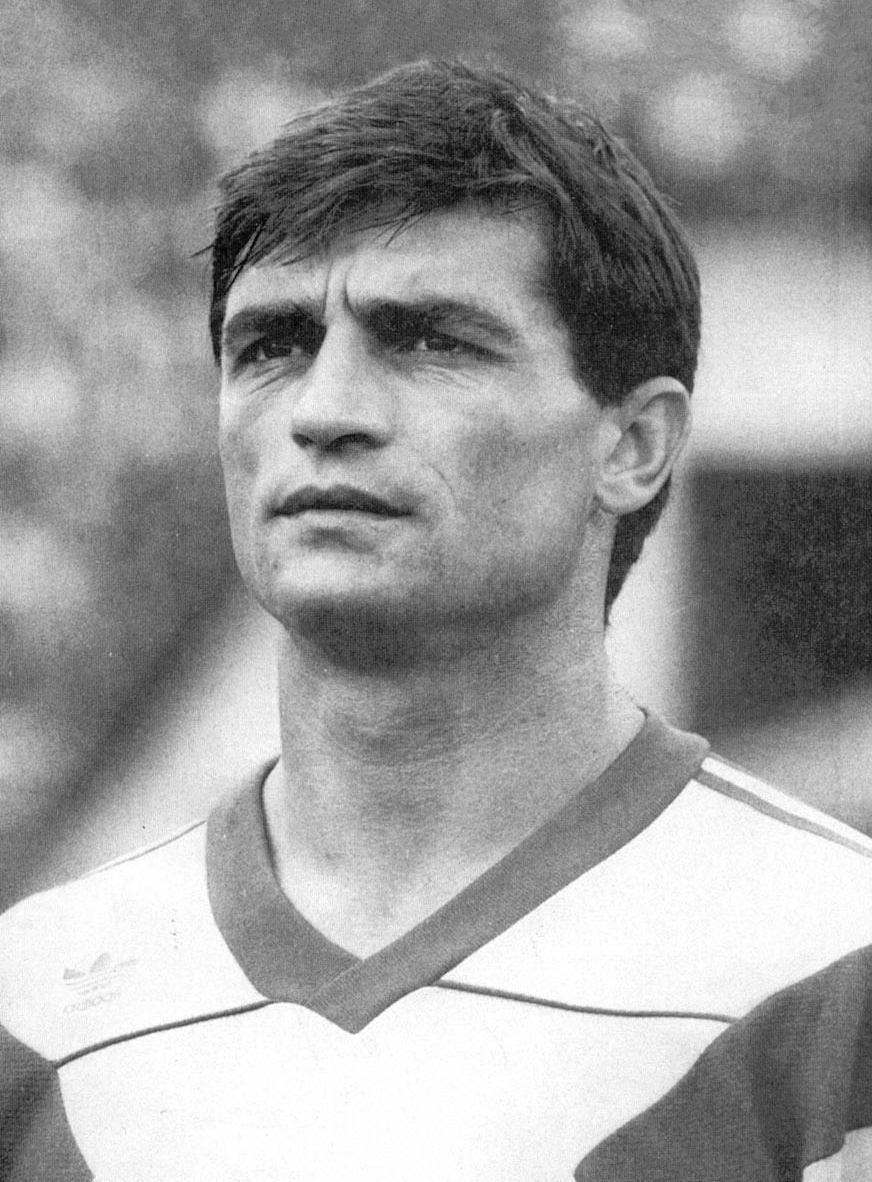
Michael Klein represented Romania in Euro 1984 and the 1990 World Cup.

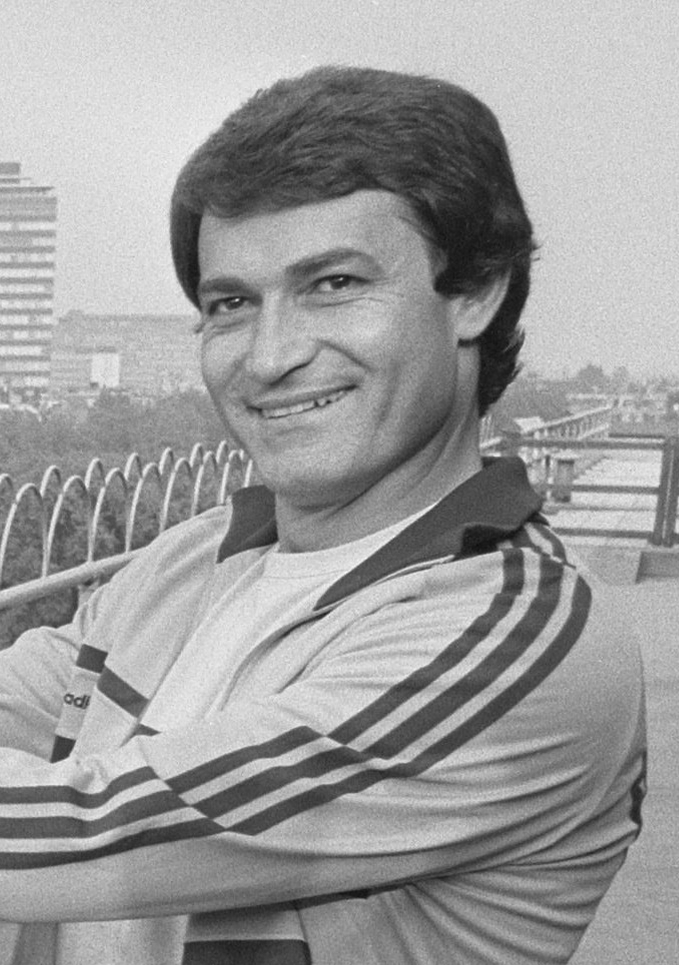
Costică Ștefănescu captained Romania during Euro 1984.

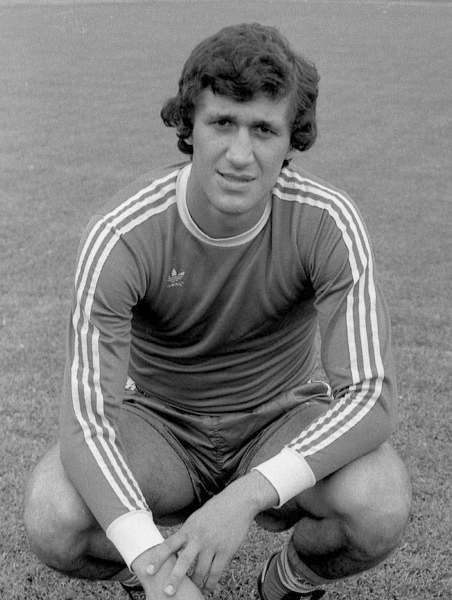
Rodion Cămătaru was a member of Romania's Euro 1984 and the 1990 World Cup squads.

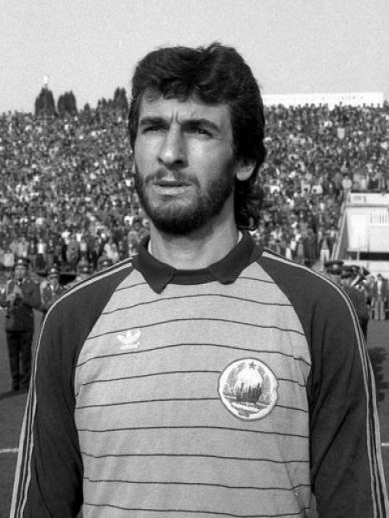
Silviu Lung was Romania's goalkeeper for both Euro 1984 and the 1990 World Cup.

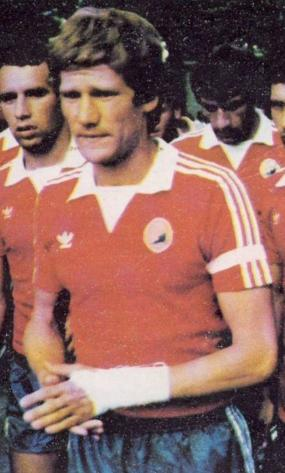
László Bölöni was the first player who reached 100 games for Romania.

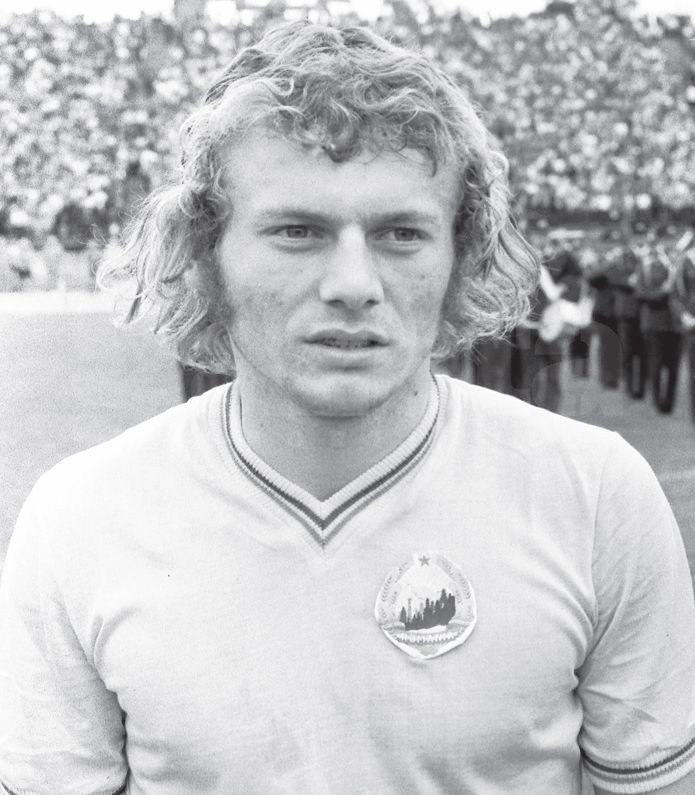
Two-time Romanian Footballer of the Year, Ilie Balaci, played 65 games for Romania.

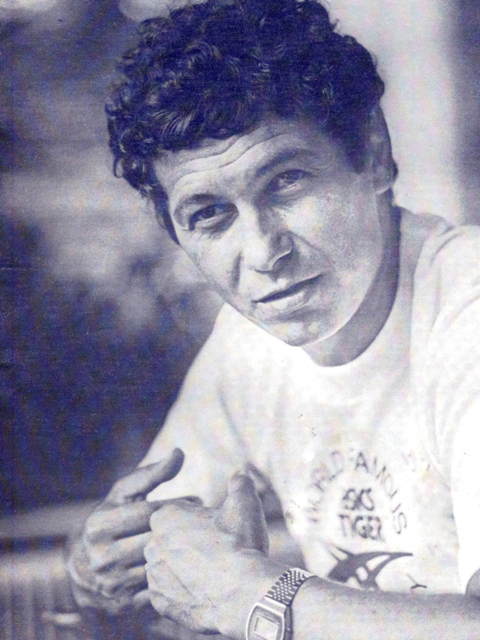
Mircea Lucescu captained Romania in the 1970 World Cup and coached the national team during Euro 1984.

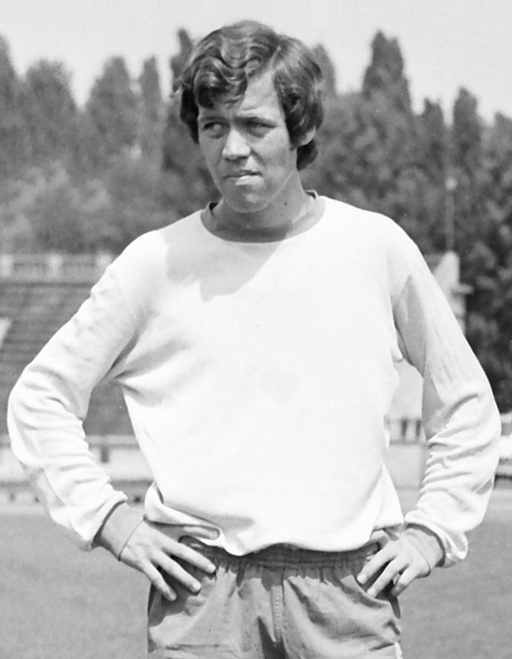
Florea Dumitrache scored two goals in the 1970 World Cup.

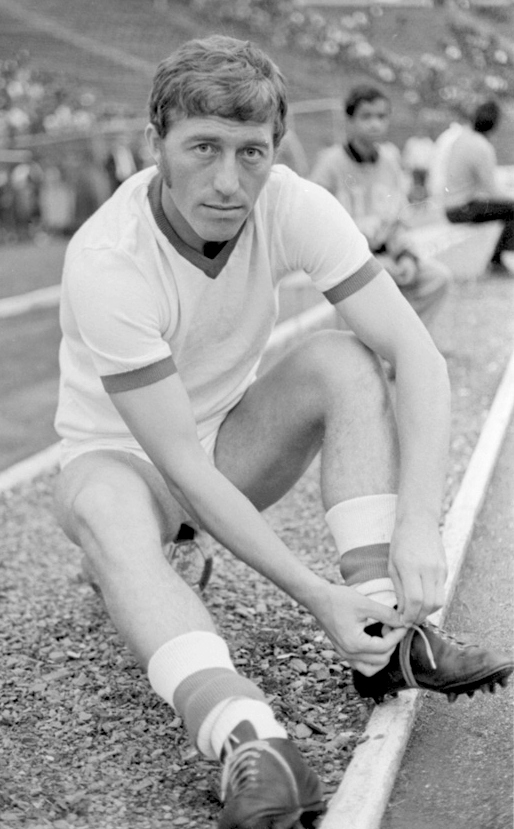
Nicolae Dobrin was the first winner of the Romanian Footballer of the Year award and was part of Romania's 1970 World Cup squad.

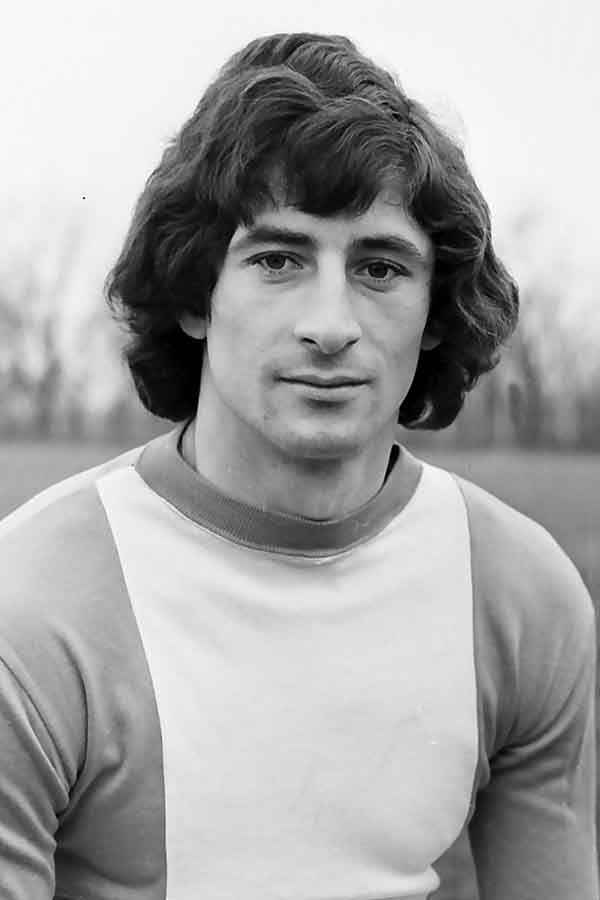
Cornel Dinu, who won the Romanian Footballer of the Year award three times, played for Romania in the 1970 World Cup.

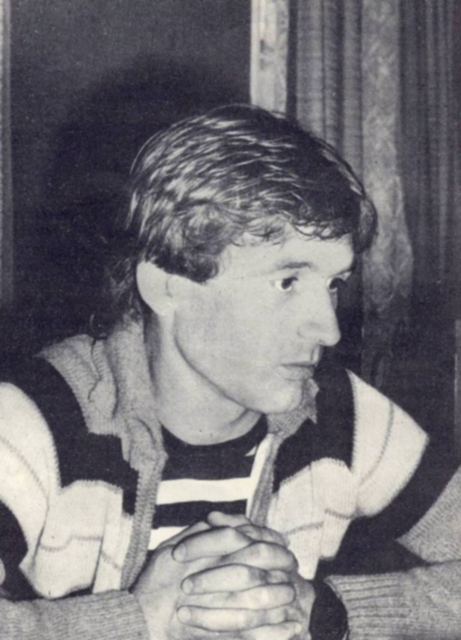
Two-time Romanian Footballer of the Year, Ion Dumitru, played for Romania in the 1970 World Cup.

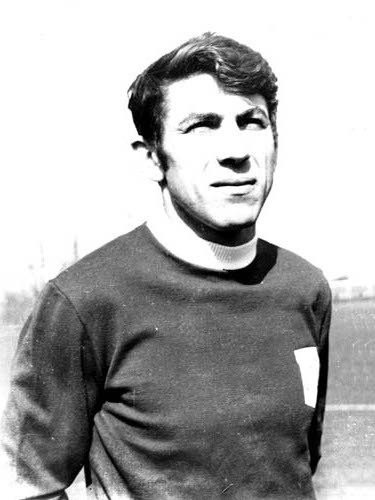
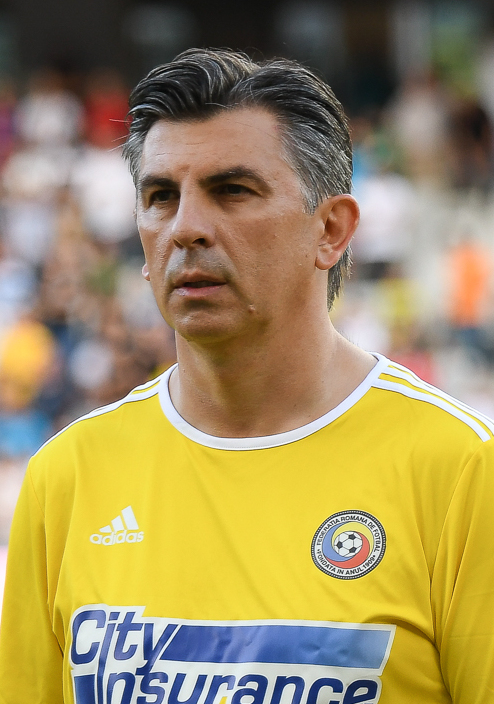
Nicolae Lupescu (left) played for Romania during the 1970 World Cup, while his son Ioan (right) represented the country in the 1990 and 1994 World Cups, and also during the Euro 1996 and 2000 editions.

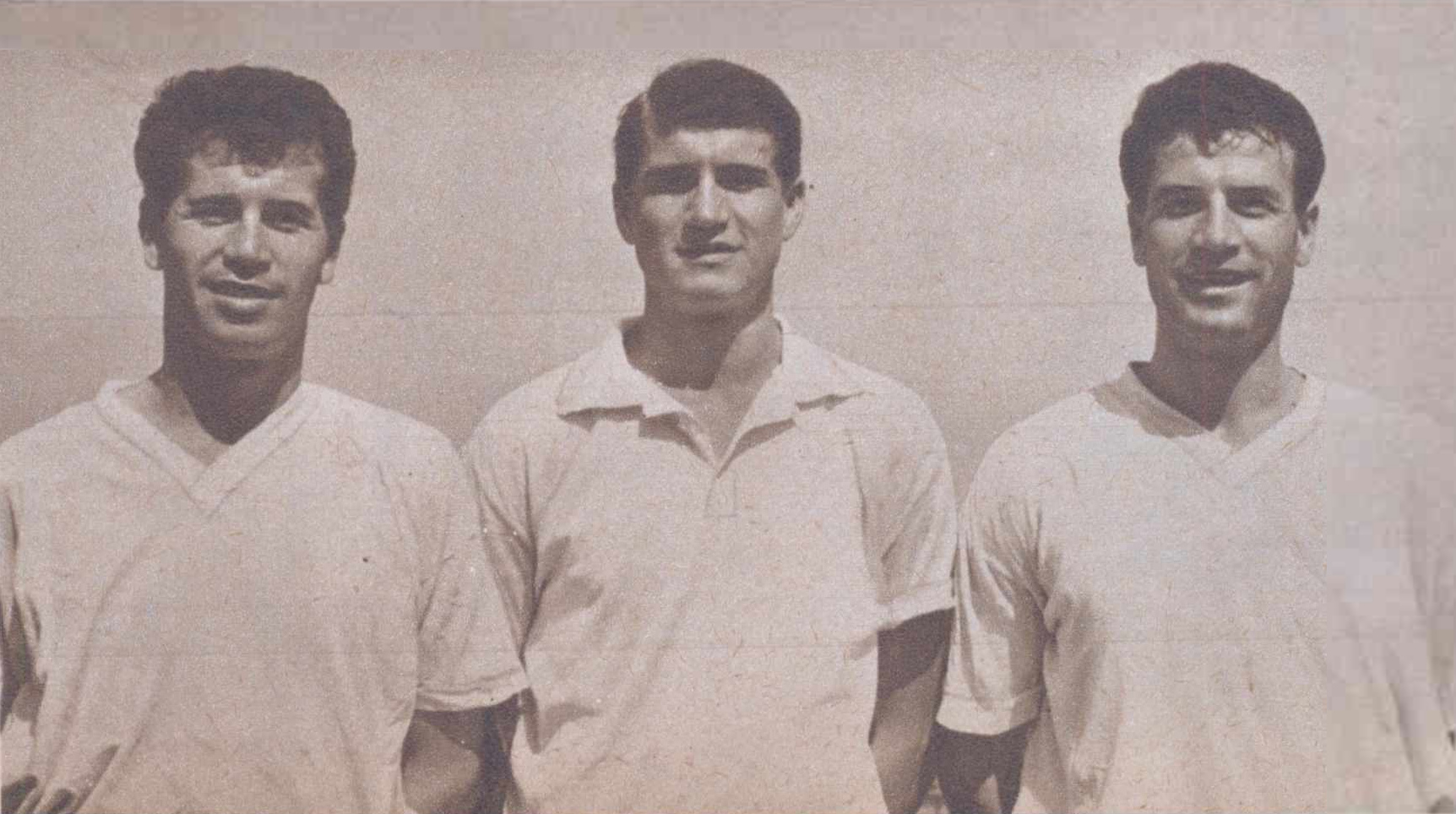
The Nunweiller brothers—Lică, Radu, and Ion, viewed from left to right— represented Romania internationally, with Radu featuring in the 1970 World Cup and Ion appearing at the 1964 Summer Olympics.

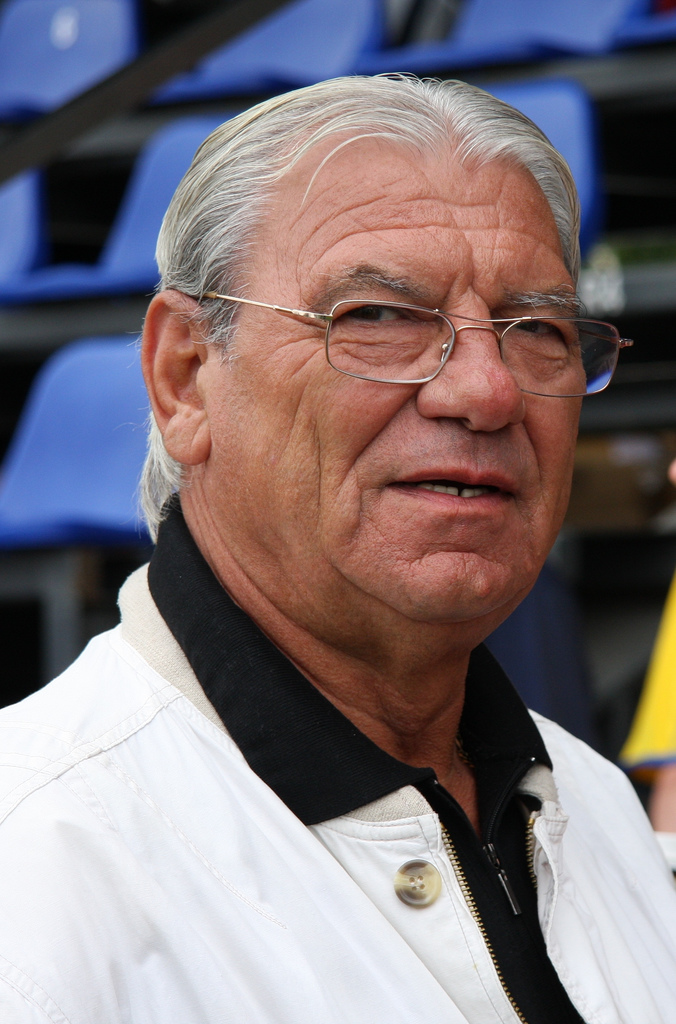
Emerich Jenei played for Romania in the 1964 Summer Olympics and later guided the national team as coach during World Cup 1990 and Euro 2000.

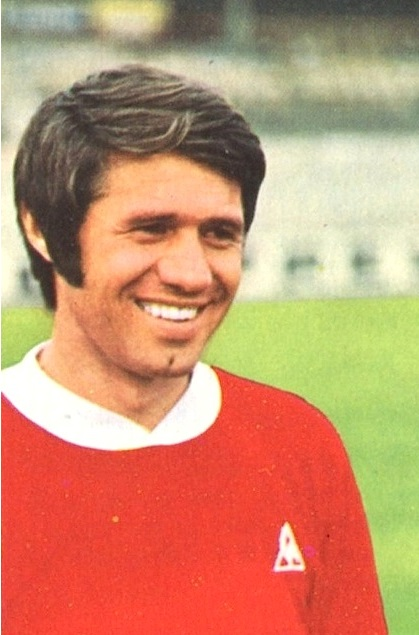
Ion Pârcălab played for Romania during the 1964 Summer Olympics.

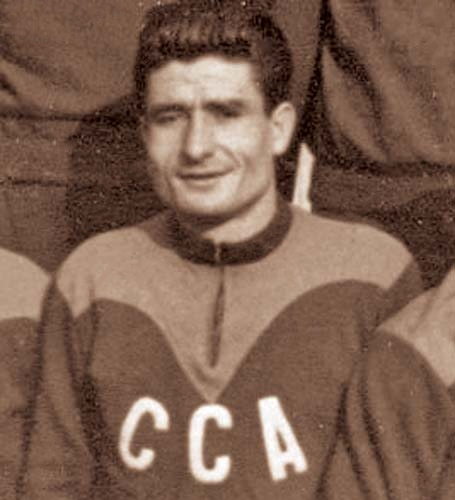
Ion Voinescu was Romania's goalkeeper in the 1952 Summer Olympics.

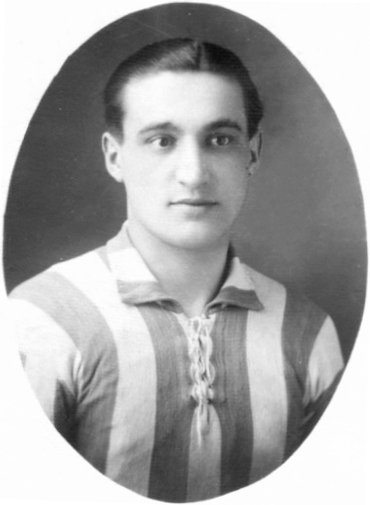
Ștefan Dobay played in both the 1934 and 1938 World Cups, scoring one goal in each tournament.

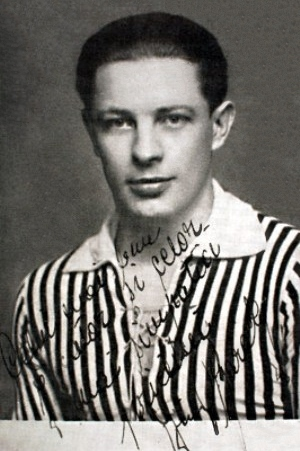
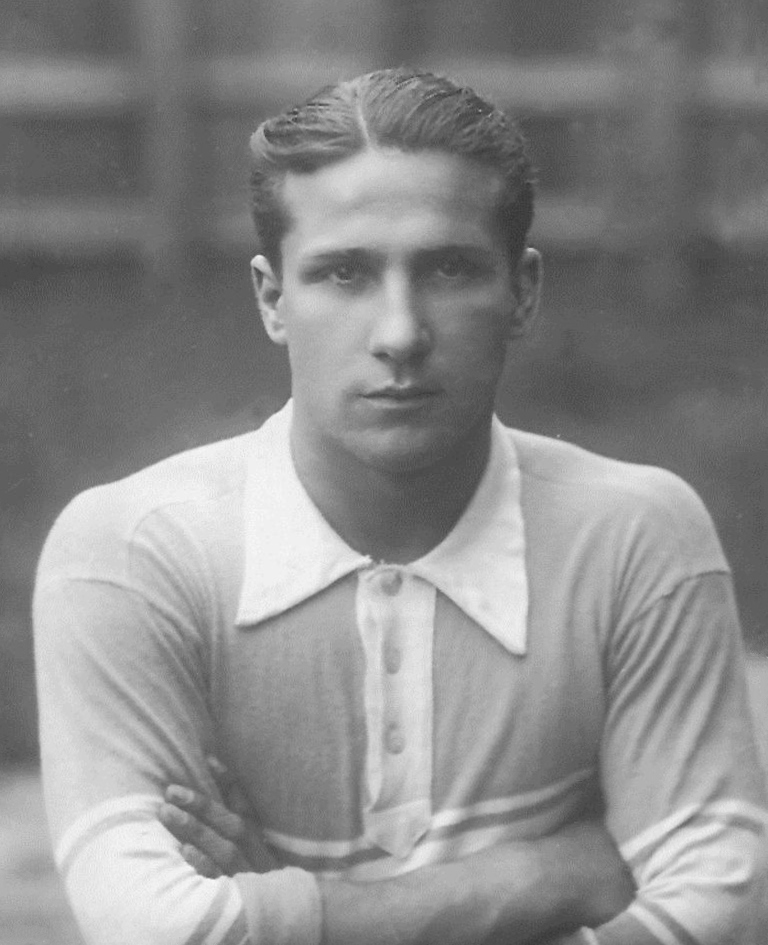
Iuliu Baratky (left) and Iuliu Bodola (right) are two of the Romanian-Hungarians who played internationally for both Romania and Hungary.
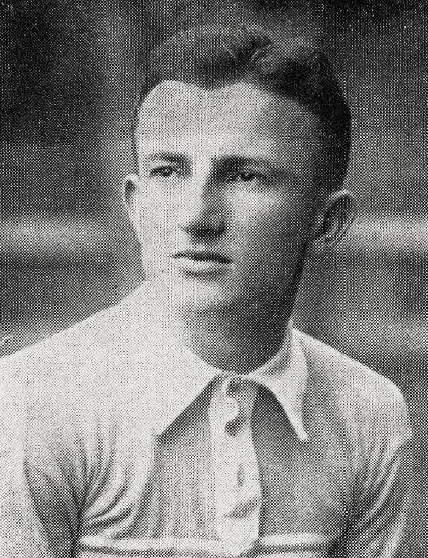
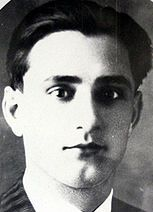
Nicolae Kovács (left) and Rudolf Bürger (right) participated in each of the first three FIFA World Cups.

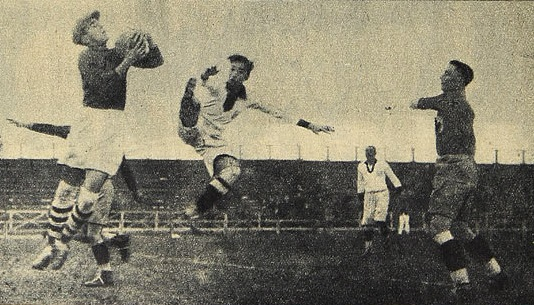
Ion Lăpușneanu (left) playing for Romania against Peru in the 1930 World Cup.

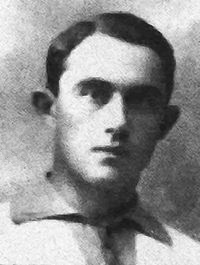
Aurel Guga was captain in Romania's first game in history against Yugoslavia in the 1922 King Alexander's Cup, and he also captained the team in its first final tournament, the 1924 Summer Olympics.

Name	Caps	Born
2026
Marian Aioani	02	7 November 1999
Andrei Borza	03	12 November 2005
Marius Corbu	02	7 May 2002
Andrei Coubiș	09	29 September 2003
Otto Hindrich	06	5 August 2002
Matei Ilie	05	11 December 2002
David Matei	03	19 July 2006
Ianis Stoica	01	8 December 2002
Tony Strata	03	7 September 2004
2025
Ștefan Baiaram	06	31 December 2002
Denis Ciobotariu	01	10 June 1998
Kevin Ciubotaru	01	02 February 2004
Cătălin Cîrjan	05	01 December 2002
Vlad Dragomir	13	24 April 1999
Lisav Eissat	07	13 January 2005
David Miculescu	08	02 May 2001
Dennis Politic	01	05 March 2000
Mihai Popescu	08	07 May 1993
2024
Alexandru Pașcanu	01	28 September 1998
Bogdan Racovițan	06	06 June 2000
Adrian Șut	08	30 April 1999
2023
Daniel Bîrligea	13	19 April 2000
Alex Dobre	07	30 August 1998
Louis Munteanu	08	16 June 2002
Vladimir Screciu	11	13 January 2000
2022
Daniel Boloca	01	22 December 1998
Radu Drăgușin	34	3 February 2002
Horațiu Moldovan	16	20 January 1998
Raul Opruț	05	4 January 1998
Alexandru Pantea	01	11 September 2003
Daniel Paraschiv	01	24 April 1999
Claudiu Petrila	02	7 November 2000
Octavian Popescu	05	27 December 2002
Nicolae Păun	02	19 January 1999
Ionuț Radu	11	28 May 1997
Antonio Sefer	01	22 April 2000
Ștefan Târnovanu	05	9 May 2000
Bogdan Vătăjelu	01	24 April 1993
Marius Ștefănescu	02	14 August 1998
2021
Alexandru Albu	01	17 August 1993
Tiberiu Căpușă	01	6 April 1998
Andrei Cordea	05	24 January 1999
Virgil Ghiță	12	4 June 1998
Jovan Marković	03	23 March 2001
Marius Marin	36	30 August 1998
Valentin Mihăilă	39	2 February 2000
Olimpiu Moruțan	20	25 April 1999
Darius Olaru	30	3 March 1998
Adrian Păun	01	1 April 1995
Ovidiu Popescu	02	27 February 1994
Andrei Rațiu	43	20 June 1998
Enes Sali	01	23 February 2006
Deian Sorescu	25	29 August 1997
Andrei Vlad	01	14 April 1999
2020
Andrei Burcă	47	15 April 1993
Mário Camora	10	10 November 1986
Alexandru Crețu	07	24 April 1992
Valentin Crețu	02	2 January 1989
Gabriel Iancu	04	15 April 1994
David Lazar	01	8 August 1991
Bogdan Mitrea	01	29 September 1987
2019
Mihai Bordeianu	04	18 November 1991
Florinel Coman	24	10 April 1998
Iulian Cristea	04	17 July 1994
Vasile Mogoș	08	31 October 1992
Adrian Rus	23	18 March 1996
Florin Ștefan	01	9 May 1996
2018
Paul Anton	11	10 May 1991
Tudor Băluță	17	27 March 1999
Alexandru Cicâldău	43	8 July 1997
Denis Drăguș	28	6 July 1999
Ianis Hagi	59	22 October 1998
Dennis Man	50	26 August 1998
Alexandru Mitriță	26	8 February 1995
Ionuț Nedelcearu	27	25 April 1996
George Pușcaș	46	8 April 1996
2017
Nicușor Bancu	56	18 September 1992
Mihai Bălașa	08	14 January 1995
Alexandru Băluță	08	13 September 1993
Cristian Ganea	08	24 May 1992
Sergiu Hanca	07	4 April 1992
Alexandru Ioniță	01	14 December 1994
Florin Niță	31	3 July 1987
George Țucudean	10	30 April 1991
2016
Romario Benzar	19	26 March 1992
Ioan Hora	02	21 August 1988
Răzvan Marin	79	23 May 1996
Dragoș Nedelcu	05	16 February 1997
Dorin Rotariu	10	29 July 1995
Nicolae Stanciu	90	7 May 1993
Bogdan Țîru	02	15 March 1994
Alin Toșca	30	14 March 1992
2015
Denis Alibec	45	5 January 1991
Florin Andone	25	11 April 1993
Constantin Budescu	14	19 February 1989
Steliano Filip	07	15 May 1994
Andrei Ivan	17	4 January 1997
2014
Eric Bicfalvi	09	5 February 1988
Gabriel Enache	05	18 August 1990
Cristian Manea	26	9 August 1997
Cosmin Matei	02	30 September 1991
Alexandru Mateiu	01	10 December 1989
Andrei Prepeliță	14	8 December 1985
Florin Tănase	30	30 December 1994
2013
Aurelian Chițu	02	25 March 1991
Ovidiu Hoban	30	27 December 1982
Claudiu Keșerü	45	2 December 1986
Constantin Nica	01	18 March 1993
Dan Nistor	06	6 May 1988
Adrian Stoian	02	11 February 1991
2012
Claudiu Bumba	01	5 January 1994
Dorin Goga	01	2 July 1984
Constantin Grecu	01	8 June 1988
Gheorghe Grozav	29	29 September 1990
Laurențiu Marinescu	01	25 August 1984
Alexandru Maxim	55	8 July 1990
Adrian Popa	22	24 July 1988
Raul Rusescu	10	9 July 1988
2011
Marius Alexe	07	22 February 1990
Liviu Antal	01	2 June 1989
Cristian Bălgrădean	01	21 March 1988
Alexandru Chipciu	50	18 May 1989
Vlad Chiricheș	77	14 November 1989
Costin Curelea	01	11 July 1984
Liviu Ganea	01	23 February 1988
Florin Gardoș	13	29 October 1988
Valerică Găman	14	25 February 1989
Gabriel Giurgiu	02	3 September 1982
Dragoș Grigore	38	7 September 1986
Iasmin Latovlevici	12	11 May 1986
Srdjan Luchin	10	4 March 1986
Alexandru Mățel	17	17 October 1989
Ionuț Neagu	03	26 October 1989
Viorel Nicoară	01	27 September 1987
Cristian Oroș	01	15 October 1984
Paul Papp	18	11 November 1989
Mihai Pintilii	43	9 November 1984
Marian Pleașcă	01	6 February 1990
Adrian Sălăgeanu	01	9 April 1983
Sabrin Sburlea	01	12 May 1989
Sorin Strătilă	01	20 October 1986
2010
Marius Bilașco	05	13 July 1981
Ciprian Deac	26	16 February 1986
George Florescu	11	21 May 1984
Ovidiu Herea	02	26 March 1985
Silviu Ilie	03	27 June 1988
Silviu Lung Jr.	03	4 June 1989
Răzvan Pădurețu	01	19 June 1981
Mihai Răduț	02	18 March 1990
Cornel Râpă	05	16 January 1990
Bogdan Stancu	52	28 June 1987
Ciprian Tătărușanu	73	9 February 1986
Gabriel Torje	55	22 November 1989
2009
Iulian Apostol	07	3 December 1980
Alexandru Bourceanu	26	24 April 1985
Ovidiu Dănănae	04	26 August 1985
George Galamaz	04	5 April 1981
Nicolae Grigore	04	19 July 1983
Maximilian Nicu	03	25 November 1982
Mihai Roman	10	16 October 1984
Romeo Surdu	06	12 January 1984
Dacian Varga	04	15 October 1984
2008
Florin Costea	06	16 May 1985
Cosmin Moți	15	3 December 1984
Cristian Panin	02	9 June 1978
Costel Pantilimon	27	1 February 1987
Gabriel Paraschiv	01	27 March 1978
Marius Popa	02	31 July 1978
Adrian Ropotan	07	8 May 1986
Cristian Săpunaru	36	5 April 1984
László Sepsi	04	7 June 1987
Răzvan Stanca	01	18 January 1980
Eduard Stăncioiu	01	3 March 1981
Cristian Tănase	40	18 February 1987
2007
Adrian Cristea	09	30 November 1983
Gabriel Mureșan	09	13 February 1982
Sergiu Radu	01	10 August 1977
Dorel Stoica	04	15 December 1978
2006
Mugurel Buga	06	16 December 1977
Vasile Maftei	12	1 January 1981
Andrei Mărgăritescu	03	1 January 1980
Bogdan Pătrașcu	02	12 May 1979
Cristian Pulhac	03	17 August 1984
Ștefan Radu	13	22 October 1986
2005
Valentin Bădoi	10	16 December 1975
Tiberiu Bălan	06	17 February 1981
Gabriel Boștină	04	22 May 1977
Gheorghe Bucur	26	8 April 1980
Răzvan Cociș	50	19 February 1983
Dănuț Coman	14	28 March 1979
Dorin Goian	60	12 December 1980
Costin Lazăr	31	24 April 1981
Ionuț Mazilu	16	9 February 1982
Mihai Neșu	08	19 February 1983
Bănel Nicoliță	37	7 January 1985
George Ogăraru	11	3 February 1980
Cosmin Pașcovici	01	12 June 1978
2004
Dan Alexa	06	28 October 1979
Gabriel Caramarin	04	7 September 1977
Marius Constantin	04	25 October 1984
Petre Marin	09	8 September 1973
Flavius Moldovan	03	27 July 1976
Sorin Paraschiv	04	17 June 1981
2003
Florin Bratu	14	2 January 1980
Zeno Bundea	01	4 October 1977
Gigel Coman	03	4 October 1978
Andrei Cristea	10	15 May 1984
Nicolae Dică	32	9 May 1980
Ștefan Grigorie	02	31 January 1982
Ciprian Marica	72	2 October 1985
Nicolae Mitea	08	24 March 1985
Daniel Niculae	39	6 October 1982
Daniel Oprița	06	10 August 1981
Mihăiță Pleșan	07	19 February 1983
Ionuț Rada	02	6 July 1982
Claudiu Răducanu	02	3 December 1976
Laurențiu Reghecampf	01	19 September 1975
Gabriel Tamaș	67	9 November 1983
Ianis Zicu	12	23 October 1983
2002
Eugen Baciu	01	25 May 1980
Florin Cernat	14	10 March 1980
Sorin Ghionea	13	11 April 1979
Vlad Munteanu	01	16 January 1981
Ovidiu Petre	23	22 March 1982
Răzvan Raț	113	26 May 1981
Lucian Sânmărtean	21	13 March 1980
Constantin Schumacher	01	8 May 1976
Bogdan Vintilă	05	27 February 1972
2001
Marian Aliuță	05	4 February 1978
Tiberiu Ghioane	21	18 June 1981
Iulian Miu	08	21 January 1976
Daniel Pancu	27	17 August 1977
Florin Pârvu	02	2 April 1975
Mihai Tararache	04	25 October 1977
2000
Cosmin Bărcăuan	08	5 August 1978
Cornel Buta	01	1 November 1977
Stelian Carabaș	01	2 October 1974
Paul Codrea	44	4 April 1981
Iulian Crivac	02	4 July 1976
Cristian Dancia	05	5 February 1980
Emilian Dolha	02	3 November 1979
Florentin Dumitru	17	25 May 1977
Adrian Iencsi	30	15 March 1975
Giani Kiriță	04	3 March 1977
Dan Lăcustă	03	22 March 1977
Bogdan Mara	11	29 September 1977
Marius Măldărășanu	08	19 April 1975
Dorel Mutică	03	14 March 1973
Adrian Mutu	77	8 January 1979
Adrian Neaga	06	4 June 1979
Marius Niculae	44	16 May 1981
Claudiu Niculescu	08	23 June 1976
Mirel Rădoi	67	22 March 1981
Narcis Răducan	01	23 September 1974
Pompiliu Stoica	08	10 September 1976
Florin Șoavă	22	24 July 1978
Iulian Tameș	05	6 December 1978
Sorin Trofin	02	31 January 1976
1999
Cristian Chivu	75	26 October 1980
Ionel Dănciulescu	08	6 December 1976
Ionel Ganea	45	10 August 1973
Daniel Florea	03	18 December 1975
Cătălin Hîldan	08	3 February 1976
Erik Lincar	05	16 October 1978
Tiberiu Lung	01	24 December 1978
Ion Luțu	01	3 August 1975
Dumitru Mitriță	01	23 June 1971
Ștefan Nanu	07	8 September 1968
Valentin Năstase	04	4 October 1974
Flavius Stoican	19	24 November 1976
Eugen Trică	04	5 August 1976
1998
Bogdan Lobonț	86	18 January 1978
Adrian Mihalcea	16	24 May 1976
Florentin Petre	54	15 January 1976
Vasile Popa	01	26 April 1969
Laurențiu Roșu	38	26 October 1975
Alin Stoica	12	10 December 1979
1997
Constantin Barbu	03	16 May 1971
Liviu Ciobotariu	32	26 March 1971
Cristian Dulca	06	25 October 1972
Lucian Marinescu	08	24 June 1972
Cătălin Munteanu	17	26 January 1979
Dan Potocianu	01	5 March 1974
Valentin Ștefan	01	25 June 1967
1996
Mugur Bolohan	03	28 May 1976
Cosmin Contra	73	15 December 1975
Tiberiu Curt	02	26 April 1975
Iulian Filipescu	52	29 March 1974
Daniel Gherasim	02	2 November 1964
Gabriel Popescu	14	23 December 1973
Dennis Șerban	13	5 January 1976
Dumitru Târțău	01	24 November 1970
Gabriel Vochin	01	26 December 1973
1995
Florin Bătrânu	08	19 March 1971
Lucian Cotora	01	16 February 1969
Adrian Matei	02	29 February 1968
Iosif Tâlvan	02	29 July 1972
1994
Augustin Călin	02	5 August 1973
Florin Cârstea	03	13 September 1972
Iulian Chiriță	03	2 February 1967
Leontin Grozavu	02	19 August 1967
Marian Ivan	03	1 June 1969
Radu Niculescu	15	2 March 1975
Corneliu Papură	12	5 September 1973
Ștefan Preda	03	18 June 1970
Viorel Tănase	01	7 October 1970
Adrian Ungur	01	13 December 1971
Dorel Zegrean	03	4 December 1969
Dorin Zotincă	02	13 April 1971
1993
Vasile Brătianu	01	13 August 1967
Gheorghe Ceaușilă	05	11 October 1966
Gheorghe Craioveanu	25	14 February 1968
Silvian Cristescu	05	29 October 1970
Anton Doboș	23	13 October 1965
Constantin Gâlcă	68	8 March 1972
Adrian Ilie	55	20 April 1974
Dănuț Moisescu	04	22 March 1972
Viorel Moldovan	70	8 August 1972
Cătălin Necula	04	4 December 1969
Ionel Pârvu	01	23 June 1970
Marius Predatu	01	15 August 1967
Daniel Prodan	54	23 March 1972
Ovidiu Stîngă	24	5 December 1972
1992
Ionel Gane	06	12 October 1971
Gábor Gerstenmájer	03	13 September 1967
Aurel Panait	01	27 August 1968
Costel Pană	06	15 July 1967
Basarab Panduru	22	11 July 1970
Tibor Selymes	46	14 May 1970
Ilie Stan	03	17 October 1967
Dumitru Stângaciu	05	9 August 1964
Florin Tene	06	10 November 1968
Constantin Varga	01	18 September 1964
Ion Vlădoiu	28	5 November 1968
1991
Romulus Buia	02	15 June 1970
Horațiu Cioloboc	02	29 September 1967
Florin Constantinovici	03	12 February 1968
Gheorghe Dumitrașcu	01	28 November 1967
Ovidiu Hanganu	12	12 May 1970
Viorel Ion	04	2 November 1967
Zoltán Kádár	07	4 October 1966
Costel Lazăr	02	19 June 1962
Vasile Mănăilă	01	22 November 1962
Gheorghe Mihali	31	9 December 1965
Sebastian Moga	04	18 December 1971
Dorinel Munteanu	134	25 June 1968
Marian Pană	02	24 December 1968
Adrian Pigulea	01	12 May 1968
Gabriel Răduță	03	15 September 1967
Ion Timofte	10	16 December 1967
Sorin Vlaicu	04	3 May 1965
Nicolae Zamfir	04	26 April 1967
1990
Pavel Badea	09	10 June 1967
Marius Cheregi	06	4 October 1967
Ovidiu Lazăr	01	3 December 1965
Dănuț Lupu	14	27 February 1967
Marian Popa	02	3 March 1964
Adrian Popescu	07	26 July 1960
Florin Prunea	40	8 August 1968
Florin Răducioiu	40	17 March 1970
Constantin Stănici	01	17 September 1969
Ștefan Stoica	02	23 June 1967
Daniel Timofte	22	1 October 1967
1989
Sorin Cigan	01	29 May 1964
Ilie Dumitrescu	62	6 January 1969
Dan Petrescu	95	22 December 1967
1988
Daniel Ciucă	03	1 June 1966
Ion Goanță	02	29 March 1963
Horațiu Lasconi	03	8 April 1963
Ioan Lupescu	74	9 December 1968
Mircea Popa	03	21 June 1962
Gheorghe Popescu	115	9 October 1967
Iosif Rotariu	25	27 September 1962
Ioan Sabău	55	12 February 1968
Bogdan Stelea	91	5 December 1967
1987
Lucian Bălan	01	25 June 1959
Augustin Eduard	01	1 August 1962
Ioan Kramer	01	11 March 1962
Gheorghe Liliac	04	22 April 1959
Mihail Majearu	01	15 July 1960
Emil Săndoi	30	1 March 1965
Mihai Țârlea	02	10 September 1964
Anton Weissenbacher	01	20 January 1965
1986
Adrian Bumbescu	15	23 February 1960
Lucian Burchel	02	20 March 1964
Niță Cireașă	01	21 January 1965
Tudorel Cristea	09	22 April 1964
Marian Damaschin	05	1 May 1961
Marian Rada	02	14 May 1960
Claudiu Vaișcovici	10	14 December 1962
Nistor Văidean	02	1 October 1961
1985
Victor Pițurcă	13	8 May 1956
Alexandru Suciu	01	29 October 1960
1984
Miodrag Belodedici	55	20 May 1964
Laurențiu Bozeșan	03	11 November 1959
Marin Dragnea	05	1 January 1956
Marius Lăcătuș	83	5 April 1964
Dorin Mateuț	56	5 August 1965
Zsolt Muzsnay	06	20 June 1965
Costel Orac	03	22 January 1959
Nicolae Soare	01	16 April 1964
Ioan Zare	07	11 May 1959
1983
Gheorghe Hagi	124	5 February 1965
Pompiliu Iordache	02	18 October 1954
Ștefan Iovan	34	23 August 1960
Mircea Irimescu	09	13 May 1959
Lică Movilă	14	21 October 1961
Petre Nica	01	12 April 1957
Constantin Pană	01	17 February 1960
Marcel Pușcaș	01	12 October 1960
Constantin Stancu	03	2 October 1956
1982
Gabi Balint	34	3 January 1963
Ioan Bogdan	09	26 January 1956
Marcel Coraș	36	14 May 1959
Alexandru Custov	02	8 May 1954
Helmut Duckadam	02	1 April 1959
Marian Mihail	05	7 May 1958
Ioan Petcu	02	1 May 1959
Viorel Turcu	07	9 August 1960
Florea Văetuș	07	23 November 1956
1981
Ioan Andone	55	15 March 1960
Septimiu Câmpeanu	04	12 July 1957
Romulus Gabor	35	14 October 1961
Gino Iorgulescu	48	15 May 1956
Michael Klein	89	10 October 1959
Mircea Rednic	83	9 April 1962
Costel Solomon	01	29 May 1959
Nelu Stănescu	06	4 August 1957
Vasile Șoiman	03	10 August 1960
Nicolae Ungureanu	56	11 October 1956
1980
Ion Geolgău	23	20 February 1961
Adrian Ionescu	03	17 May 1958
Marcel Lică	02	25 June 1957
Nicolae Negrilă	27	23 July 1954
1979
Ilie Bărbulescu	05	24 June 1957
Constantin Cârstea	01	22 February 1949
Sorin Cârțu	07	12 November 1955
Romulus Chihaia	01	4 March 1952
Sevastian Iovănescu	01	2 October 1953
Silviu Lung	76	9 September 1956
Ion Munteanu	23	7 June 1955
Alexandru Nicolae	19	17 March 1955
Andrei Speriatu	04	29 September 1957
Tudorel Stoica	15	7 September 1954
Constantin Ștefan	01	8 January 1951
Nicolae Tilihoi	09	9 December 1956
Cornel Țălnar	06	9 June 1957
Aurel Țicleanu	42	20 January 1959
1978
Ionel Augustin	34	11 October 1955
Imre Bíró	01	17 April 1958
Rodion Cămătaru	73	22 June 1958
Andrei Fanici	01	14 April 1955
Florin Grigore	03	3 May 1956
Doru Nicolae	07	22 March 1952
Dan Păltinișanu	03	23 March 1951
Aurel Rădulescu	06	13 October 1953
Constantin Stan	03	20 October 1949
Alexandru Terheș	02	25 July 1960
Florea Voicilă	02	1 January 1954
Mihai Zamfir	10	22 January 1955
1977
Cristian Gheorghe	14	10 September 1956
Bruno Grigore	05	23 January 1951
Petre Mehedințu	06	8 September 1949
Leonida Nedelcu	01	14 August 1952
Pavel Peniu	01	29 June 1953
Costică Ștefănescu	64	26 March 1951
1976
Stelian Anghel	02	7 March 1952
Ion Atodiresei	01	14 May 1952
Ion Florea	01	27 February 1949
Octavian Ionescu	02	1 October 1949
Vasile Iordache	23	9 October 1950
Alexandru Koller	05	20 April 1953
Dumitru Manea	03	7 December 1948
Nicolae Manea	01	11 March 1954
Viorel Năstase	01	7 October 1953
Marin Radu	07	15 March 1956
Marcel Răducanu	18	21 October 1954
Nicolae Tănăsescu	02	9 October 1949
1975
László Bölöni	102	11 March 1953
Árpád Fazekas	03	20 July 1949
Teodor Lucuță	03	2 May 1955
Ion Mateescu	01	25 November 1952
Dumitru Moraru	38	8 May 1956
Mihai Romilă	18	1 October 1950
Constantin Zamfir	11	15 May 1951
1974
Teodor Anghelini	22	9 March 1954
Ilie Balaci	65	13 September 1956
Florin Cheran	29	5 April 1947
Zoltan Crișan	41	3 May 1955
Gheorghe Cristache	03	9 July 1951
Silviu Iorgulescu	04	28 July 1946
Gheorghe Mulțescu	15	13 November 1951
Gabriel Sandu	17	7 November 1952
Alexandru Sătmăreanu	28	9 March 1952
1973
Dudu Georgescu	40	1 September 1950
Viorel Mureșan	01	11 February 1952
Ștefan Sameș	46	14 October 1951
Radu Troi	15	14 June 1946
Teodor Țarălungă	03	8 June 1945
1972
Dumitru Antonescu	13	25 March 1945
Ladislau Brosovszky	03	23 March 1951
Vasile Dobrău	05	14 June 1953
Iuliu Hajnal	12	30 August 1951
Vasile Ianul	01	1 November 1945
Nicolae Ionescu	04	12 June 1949
Petre Ivan	02	26 November 1946
Radu Jercan	02	30 November 1945
Attila Kun	17	9 March 1949
Dumitru Marcu	16	9 April 1950
Florin Mioc	01	13 December 1947
Marin Olteanu	01	17 April 1950
Nicolae Pantea	02	12 February 1946
Lazăr Pârvu	01	24 February 1946
Marian Petreanu	01	8 September 1950
Ion Pop	02	8 May 1947
Paul Popovici	01	21 June 1948
Mihai Rugiubei	01	22 December 1946
Mircea Sandu	16	22 October 1952
Vasile Simionaș	04	16 November 1950
Viorel Smarandache	01	2 July 1953
Vasile Suciu	01	21 October 1942
Remus Vlad	03	19 January 1946
1971
Aurel Beldeanu	19	5 March 1951
Anghel Iordănescu	57	4 May 1950
1970
Stere Adamache	07	17 August 1941
Florian Dumitrescu	04	27 October 1946
Ion Dumitru	50	2 January 1950
Alexandru Neagu	19	19 July 1948
Nicolae Pescaru	03	27 March 1943
Gheorghe Tătaru	06	5 May 1948
Iosif Vigu	22	15 May 1946
1969
Dan Anca	07	7 January 1947
Aristică Ghiţă	03	15 June 1940
Marin Tufan	02	14 October 1942
1968
Emerich Dembrovschi	26	6 October 1945
Cornel Dinu	67	2 August 1948
Flavius Domide	17	11 May 1946
Florea Dumitrache	31	22 May 1948
Gheorghe Gornea	04	2 August 1944
Mihai Ivăncescu	03	22 March 1942
Mircea Petescu	02	15 May 1942
1967
Alexandru Boc	06	3 June 1946
Teofil Codreanu	01	1 February 1941
Narcis Coman	08	5 November 1946
Mircea Constantinescu	02	25 February 1945
Octavian Dincuță	01	28 June 1947
Dumitru Dumitriu	01	19 November 1945
Gheorghe Florea	01	25 April 1937
Gheorghe Grozea	04	12 January 1945
Csaba Györffy	01	9 July 1943
Tiberiu Kallo	05	7 August 1943
Petre Libardi	02	27 August 1942
Nicolae Lupescu	20	17 December 1940
Florea Martinovici	02	19 April 1940
Constantin Moldoveanu	01	25 October 1943
Iuliu Năftănăilă	03	25 August 1942
Constantin Năsturescu	03	2 October 1940
Dumitru Nicolae	06	29 March 1943
Răducanu Necula	56	10 May 1946
Lajos Sătmăreanu	42	21 February 1944
Vasile Șoo	01	19 April 1942
Florea Voinea	01	21 April 1941
1966
Ion Barbu	07	24 December 1938
Augustin Deleanu	25	23 August 1944
Nicolae Dobrin	48	26 August 1947
Constantin Frățilă	07	1 October 1942
Mircea Lucescu	64	29 July 1945
Paul Marcu	01	2 June 1939
Mihai Mocanu	33	24 February 1942
Nicolae Nagy	01	8 March 1942
Radu Nunweiller	41	16 November 1944
Constantin Radu	03	5 January 1945
Eugen Stoicescu	01	5 April 1940
Simion Surdan	01	9 February 1940
1965
Marin Andrei	01	22 October 1940
Sorin Avram	09	29 March 1943
Alexandru Badea	04	8 March 1938
Emil Dumitriu	06	5 November 1942
Carol Haidu	05	3 June 1942
Bujor Hălmăgeanu	17	16 February 1941
Mihai Ionescu	13	19 November 1936
Constantin Iancu	05	26 August 1940
Iosif Lereter	01	23 July 1933
Mircea Sasu	05	5 October 1939
1963
Dan Coe	41	8 September 1941
Carol Creiniceanu	03	1 February 1939
Ilie Datcu	06	20 July 1937
Ion Haidu	04	1 January 1942
Cornel Pavlovici	02	2 April 1943
Ion Țîrcovnicu	01	7 April 1936
Iosif Varga	02	4 December 1941
1962
Gheorghe Dungu	02	5 April 1929
Mircea Georgescu	03	9 July 1938
Vasile Gergely	34	28 October 1941
Ion Ionescu	15	5 April 1938
Zoltán Ivansuc	03	12 August 1938
Constantin Koszka	09	17 September 1939
Iosif Lazăr	02	1933
Cicerone Manolache	03	16 May 1936
Dumitru Munteanu	01	3 July 1932
Emil Petru	07	28 September 1939
Dumitru Popescu	07	17 March 1942
Nicolae Selymes	01	11 March 1940
Vasile Sfetcu	03	10 May 1937
Marin Voinea	03	21 November 1935
1961
Ilie Greavu	10	19 July 1937
Dumitru Ivan	06	14 May 1938
Ion Motroc	02	14 February 1937
Lică Nunweiller	04	12 December 1938
Ion Pârcălab	26	5 November 1941
1960
Alexandru Fronea	01	15 November 1933
Emanoil Hașoti	03	14 September 1932
Viorel Mateianu	06	1 June 1938
Petre Mândru	02	13 September 1935
Gabriel Raksi	02	1 November 1938
1959
Mircea Dridea	18	7 April 1934
Emerich Jenei	12	28 March 1937
Vasile Mihăilescu	01	1936
Vasile Seredai	04	22 December 1933
Augustin Todor	01	14 January 1934
1958
Vasile Alexandru	05	18 July 1935
Petre Cădariu	01	
Constantin Dinulescu	03	19 April 1931
Haralambie Eftimie	03	1 September 1934
Alexandru Karikaș	05	10 May 1931
Dumitru Macri	08	28 April 1931
Ion Nunweiller	26	9 January 1936
Nicolae Oaidă	06	9 April 1933
Nicolae Panait	01	1935
Cornel Popa	27	17 March 1935
1957
Vasile Anghel	04	22 November 1937
Ion Panait	01	5 March 1924
1956
Ion Alecsandrescu	04	17 July 1928
Octavian Brânzei	02	28 September 1928
Gheorghe Cacoveanu	06	16 September 1935
Gheorghe Constantin	20	14 December 1932
Zoltan David	01	2 August 1932
Anton Munteanu	01	3 July 1932
Ion Neacșu	10	19 September 1930
Iacob Olaru	01	1930
Valeriu Soare	05	25 June 1932
Ion Zaharia	01	20 September 1929
1955
Vichentie Birău	01	1929
Vasile Copil	03	29 February 1936
Gheorghe Ene	03	27 January 1937
Nicolae Georgescu	13	1 January 1936
Nicolae Mihai	03	1926
Gheorghe Pahonțu	04	17 July 1933
Daniel Peretz	05	27 April 1927
Ioan Suciu	02	30 November 1933
Gheorghe Toma	01	1929
1954
Ilie Gârleanu	01	20 July 1930
Traian Ivănescu	01	5 May 1933
Valeriu Neagu	01	26 April 1930
Nicolae Tătaru	24	16 December 1931
Stere Zeană	01	26 March 1926
1953
Adalbert Androvits	07	9 January 1926
Florea Birtașu	03	1930
Nicolae Dumitru	08	12 December 1928
Alexandru Ene	10	19 September 1928
Iuliu Kiss	01	1926
Ștefan Onisie	06	23 November 1925
Iosif Szökő	11	18 March 1930
Costică Toma	16	1 January 1923
1952
Ștefan Balint	01	26 January 1926
Valeriu Călinoiu	20	9 October 1928
Aurel Crâsnic	01	11 May 1926
Guido Fodor	01	
Florian Marinescu	01	1930
Titus Ozon	22	13 May 1927
Tudor Paraschiva	06	27 December 1919
Nicolae Roman	01	15 September 1925
1951
Tiberiu Bone	12	13 April 1929
Francisc Zavoda	08	14 April 1927
Vasile Zavoda	20	26 June 1929
1950
Florian Ambru	01	1928
Gavril Serfözö	13	25 September 1926
Ion Suru	12	20 October 1927
1949
Alexandru Apolzan	22	6 February 1927
Petre Ivan	01	1927
Ion Lungu	05	2 August 1921
Petre Moldoveanu	05	24 June 1925
Carol Szekesy	01	
Alexandru Tănase	01	12 September 1923
Ion Voinescu	21	18 April 1929
Ladislau Zilahi	03	24 March 1922
1948
Carol Bartha	07	19 September 1923
Petre Bădeanțu	01	12 March 1929
Gheorghe Bodo	08	1923
Anton Fernbach-Ferenczi	01	4 March 1925
Mihai Flamaropol	04	21 November 1919
Traian Ionescu	05	17 July 1923
Alexandru Marky	04	5 August 1919
Andrei Mercea	06	16 March 1925
Gheorghe Petrescu	02	28 February 1919
Andrei Rădulescu	04	9 February 1925
Moise Vass	02	18 May 1920
1947
Ladislau Bonyhádi	03	25 March 1923
Iuliu Darok	02	1924
Ion Drăgan	01	
Nicolae Dumitrescu	10	8 December 1921
Zoltan Farmati	21	9 July 1924
Florea Fătu	01	17 July 1924
Stanislau Konrad	01	23 October 1913
Adalbert Kovács	03	28 September 1920
Constantin Marinescu	11	12 February 1923
Jack Moisescu	01	16 October 1920
Caius Novac	01	17 August 1921
Adalbert Pall	05	1 April 1918
Valentin Stănescu	05	20 November 1922
Iosif Stibinger	02	24 September 1923
Gheorghe Váczi	11	4 August 1922
1946
Iosif Fabian	03	10 August 1923
Eugen Iordache	12	30 April 1922
Gheorghe Lăzăreanu	04	6 May 1924
Francisc Mészáros	03 (HUN-01)	5 May 1919
Mátyás Tóth	03 (HUN-16)	12 November 1918
1945
Gheorghe Băcuț	28	12 July 1927
Aurel Boroș	02	1923
Francisc Fabian	01	21 October 1917
Iuliu Farkaș	09	8 September 1923
Remus Ghiurițan	01	7 September 1919
Ladislau Incze II	04	17 October 1918
Vasile Ion	01	1921
József Pecsovszky	32 (HUN-03)	2 July 1921
Iosif Ritter	17	2 December 1921
1943
Iosif Kovács	07	13 November 1921
Alexandru Mari	04	8 November 1919
Vasile Naciu	01	
1942
Marius Beraru	01	28 November 1920
Alexandru Drăgan	02	
Ștefan Filotti	13	19 September 1922
Florian Radu	01	8 April 1920
Ioan Wetzer	03	3 August 1916
1941
Kostas Choumis	02 (GRE-09)	20 November 1913
Bazil Marian	18	7 November 1922
Valeriu Niculescu	02	25 January 1914
Ion Șiclovan	04	7 May 1921
1940
Justin Apostol	03	14 September 1921
Gheorghe Constantinescu	06	3 February 1912
Sever Coracu	02	2 October 1920
Ion Mihăilescu	15	27 March 1916
Nicolae Simatoc	08	1 May 1920
1939
Iosif Lengheriu	07	24 May 1914
Ioan Lupaș	08	8 June 1914
Adalbert Marksteiner	02 (HUN-01)	7 April 1919
Alexandru Negrescu	08	
Ilie Oană	02	16 August 1918
Nicolae Reuter	14	6 December 1914
Iosif Slivăț	03	19 February 1915
Francisc Spielmann	11 (HUN-07)	10 June 1916
1938
Traian Iordache	03	10 October 1911
Nicolae Iordăchescu	01	1919
Cornel Orza	07	9 January 1916
Gyula Prassler	02	16 January 1916
1937
Ion Bogdan	12	6 March 1915
Gheorghe Brandabura	04	23 February 1913
Arcadie Buibaş	02	1914
Iacob Felecan	09	1 March 1914
Ioachim Moldoveanu	11	17 August 1913
Silviu Ploeșteanu	11	28 January 1913
Gheorghe Popescu I	06	8 August 1919
Gheorghe Rășinaru	07	10 February 1915
Robert Sadowski	05	16 August 1914
1936
Mircea David	12	16 October 1914
Ştefan Dobra	01	1914
Dumitru Pavlovici	18	26 April 1912
1935
Andrei Bărbulescu	03	16 October 1909
Zoltán Beke	06	30 July 1911
Cornel Bugariu	02	
Vintilă Cossini	25	21 November 1913
Alexandru Cuedan	04	26 September 1910
Rudolf Demetrovics	08	27 September 1914
Gheorghe Georgescu	03	15 July 1911
Lucian Gruin	01	31 October 1913
István Klimek	01	15 April 1913
Nicolae Munteanu	01	1910
Petre Rădulescu	01	1 July 1915
Dincă Schileru	02	
Zoltán Szaniszló	05 (HUN-01)	20 August 1910
Andrei Szilard	01	
1934
Carol Burdan	03	1912
Anghel Crețeanu	06	5 April 1910
Andrei Criza	01	
Nicolae David	02	9 August 1915
Vasile Deheleanu	05	12 August 1910
Gusztáv Juhász	21	19 December 1911
Petre Sucitulescu	04	
Ion Zelenak	01	
1933
Iuliu Baratky	20 (HUN-09)	14 May 1910
Andrei Sepci	04	7 October 1911
Petea Vâlcov	07	1910
1932
Silviu Bindea	27	24 October 1912
Vasile Gain	02	5 January 1912
Rudolf Kotormány	09	23 January 1911
Eugen Lakatos	06	24 October 1912
Adalbert Püllöck	04	6 April 1907
Sándor Schwartz	10	18 January 1909
1931
Gheorghe Albu	42	18 November 1909
Iuliu Bodola	48 (HUN-13)	26 February 1912
Vasile Chiroiu	09	13 August 1910
Alfred Eisenbeisser	09	7 April 1908
Andrei Glanzmann	13	27 March 1907
Elemér Kocsis	12	27 February 1910
József Moravetz	10	14 January 1911
Gheorghe Mureşanu	01	
Radu Niculescu	01	11 November 1909
Lazăr Sfera	14	29 April 1909
Samuel Zauber	03	1 January 1901
1930
Ștefan Dobay	41	26 September 1909
Adalbert Hrehuss	02	1906
Corneliu Robe	14	23 May 1908
Petre Steinbach	18	1 January 1906
1929
Alexandru Borbely	05	27 November 1910
Iuliu Borbely	03	1909
Francisc Boros	02	1906
Rudolf Bürger	34	31 October 1908
Vasile Cristescu	01	
Iosif Czako	02	11 June 1906
Ștefan Czinczer	06	26 October 1905
Adalbert Deșu	06	24 March 1909
Emanoil Dumitrescu	03	1 June 1907
Victor Giurgiu	01	
Nicolae Kovács	37 (HUN-01)	29 December 1911
Ion Lăpușneanu	10	8 December 1908
Iuliu Madarasz	04	1898
Mircea Nicolaescu	01	11 November 1909
Iulian Pop	01	14 May 1907
László Raffinsky	20	23 April 1905
Nichita Rusen	02	
Constantin Stanciu	08	24 September 1907
Octavian Stoian	01	
Ilie Subășeanu	02	1906
1928
Gheorghe Ciolac	24	10 August 1908
Wilhelm Possak	02	9 August 1906
Ludovic Raab	01	2 October 1899
Adalbert Rech	01	5 August 1903
Grațian Sepi	23	30 December 1910
1927
Ștefan Barbu	07	2 March 1908
Pompeiu Lazăr	01	1906
Iosif Magöry	01	1904
Pál Teleki	01 (HUN-07)	5 March 1906
1926
István Avar	02 (HUN-21)	27 May 1905
Balázs Hoksary	05	22 November 1902
Ioan Kiss	04	8 April 1901
Franz Kugelbauer	02	
Nicolae Oțeleanu	01	6 January 1908
Adalbert Steiner	10	24 January 1907
Rudolf Steiner	05	20 October 1903
Nicolae Sternberg	01	
Vilmos Zombori	09	11 January 1906
1925
Iosif Brauchler	01	
Alexandru Chifor	01	
Vasile Cipcigan	02	
Nicolae Cseh	02	1900
Constantin Deleanu	01	1904
Alexandru Geller	03	
Charles Kohler	01	9 October 1900
Geza Nagy-Csomag	03	1903
Svetozar Popović	01	6 February 1902
Francisc Szekely	02	1897
Ioan Tesler	06	1903
Ioan Tóth	01	
1924
Nicolae Bonciocat	02	13 April 1898
Ladislau Csillag	01	8 February 1896
Iacob Holz	01	1901
Iosif Kilianovits	03	1903
Ioan Krieshofer	01	27 September 1900
Attila Molnár	01	2 February 1898
Adalbert Rössler	01	1898
Augustin Semler	05	1904
Ștefan Ströck	03	11 February 1901
Emerich Vogl	29	12 August 1905
Károly Weichelt	01	2 March 1906
1923
Simion Deutsch	01	1898
Tudor Florian	01	1900
Iuliu Fuhrmann	01	19 November 1901
Isidor Gansl	01	16 November 1896
Ioan Halmoș	01	23 April 1901
Iosif Klein	01	1902
Alexandru Leitner	01	24 June 1901
Rudolf Matek	03	24 June 1898
Adalbert Nuridschany	01	6 September 1894
Hans Paulini	01	4 February 1895
Atanasie Protopopesco	01	08 April 1900
Mircea Stroescu	02	1 April 1900
Iosif Szilagyi	01	
Mihai Tänzer	10 (HUN-05)	7 February 1905
Mircea Teclu	01	
Gheorghe Tóth-Bedö	01	1895
Leopold Tritsch	02	22 February 1901
Oscar Tritsch	01	3 April 1905
Dumitru Vețianu	01	1900
Rudolf Wetzer	17	17 March 1901
1922
Ioan Auer	01	18 April 1902
Iosif Bartha	11	18 July 1902
Zoltan Drescher	03	19 April 1900
Carol Frech	03	1896
Aurel Guga	12	10 August 1898
Elemer Hirsch	05	14 May 1895
Nicolae Hönigsberg	06	28 August 1901
Dezideriu Jacobi	05	23 March 1900
Emil Koch	01	7 June 1897
Alexandru Kozovits	03	3 September 1899
Stanislav Micinski	01	1 November 1899
Adalbert Ritter	04	29 April 1900
Ferenc Rónay	08	29 April 1900
Paul Schiller	02	7 March 1895
Albert Ströck	08 (HUN-14)	12 February 1903
Alexandru Szatmary	06	19 December 1894
Alois Szilagyi	01	15 June 1901
Francisc Zimmermann	02	1904
