= Micinski =

Micinski is a surname. Notable people with the surname include:

- Stanislav Micinski, Romanian footballer
- Tadeusz Miciński, Polish poet, novelist and playwright
