= Hans Paulini =

Romanian footballer

Personal information
- Date of birth: 4 February 1895
- Position: Goalkeeper

Senior career*
Years	Team	Apps	(Gls)
1922–1924	Olympia București		

International career
1923	Romania	1	(0)
- * Club domestic league appearances and goals

Hans Paulini (born 4 February 1895, date of death unknown) was a Romanian footballer who played as a goalkeeper.

== International career ==
Hans Paulini played one friendly match for Romania, on 26 October 1923 under coach Constantin Rădulescu in a 2–2 against Turkey.
