= Oscar Tritsch =

Romanian footballer

Personal information
- Date of birth: 3 April 1905
- Place of birth: Brassó, Austria-Hungary
- Date of death: 19 August 1970 (aged 65)
- Place of death: Brașov, Romania
- Position: Striker

Senior career*
Years	Team	Apps	(Gls)
1922–1924	Brașovia Brașov		

International career
1923	Romania	1	(0)
- * Club domestic league appearances and goals

Oscar Tritsch (3 April 1905 – 19 August 1970) was a Romanian footballer who played as a striker. His brother, Leopold Tritsch was also a footballer, they played together at Brașovia Brașov and Romania's national team.

== International career ==
Oscar Tritsch played one friendly match for Romania, playing alongside his brother, Leopold on 26 October 1923 under coach Constantin Rădulescu in a 2–2 against Turkey.
