= Alexandru Szatmary =

Romanian footballer

Personal information
- Date of birth: 19 December 1894
- Date of death: 23 February 1963 (aged 60)
- Position: Goalkeeper

Senior career*
| Years | Team | Apps | (Gls) |
| 1922–1932 | CA Cluj | | |

International career
| 1922–1931 | Romania | 6 | (0) |
- * Club domestic league appearances and goals

Alexandru Szatmary (19 December 1894 – 23 February 1963) was a Romanian football goalkeeper.

== International career ==
Alexandru Szatmary played six games at international level for Romania, making his debut in a friendly which ended 1–1 against Poland. He also played one game at the successful 1929–31 Balkan Cup in a 5–2 home victory against Bulgaria.

== Honours ==
Romania

- Balkan Cup: 1929–31
