= Leopold Tritsch =

Romanian footballer

Personal information
- Date of birth: 22 February 1901
- Date of death: 1981 (aged 79–80)
- Position: Defender

Senior career*
Years	Team	Apps	(Gls)
1923–1925	Brașovia Brașov		

International career
1923–1924	Romania	2	(0)
- * Club domestic league appearances and goals

Leopold Tritsch (22 February 1901 – 1981) was a Romanian footballer who played as a defender. His brother, Oscar Tritsch was also a footballer, they played together at Brașovia Brașov and Romania's national team.

== International career ==
Leopold Tritsch played two friendly matches for Romania, making his debut together with his brother, Oscar on 26 October 1923 under coach Constantin Rădulescu in a 2–2 draw against Turkey. His second game was a 4–1 loss against Austria. He was also part of Romania's 1924 Summer Olympics squad.
