= Iuliu Madarasz =

Romanian footballer

Personal information
- Date of birth: 1898
- Date of death: 1969 (aged 70–71)
- Position: Defender

Senior career*
Years	Team	Apps	(Gls)
1928–1931	Banatul Timișoara		

International career
1929–1930	Romania	4	(0)
- * Club domestic league appearances and goals

Iuliu Madarasz (1898 – 1969) was a Romanian footballer who played as a defender.

== International career ==
Iuliu Madarasz played four matches for Romania, making his debut on 21 April 1929 under coach Constantin Rădulescu in a friendly which ended with a 3–0 victory against Bulgaria.

Scores and results table. Romania's goal tally first:

International appearances
App	Date	Venue	Opponent	Result	Competition
1.	21 April 1929	Bucharest, Romania	Bulgaria	3–0	Friendly
2.	10 May 1929	Bucharest, Romania	Yugoslavia	2–3	King Alexander's Cup 1929
3.	15 September 1929	Sofia, Bulgaria	Bulgaria	3–2	Friendly
4.	12 October 1930	Sofia, Bulgaria	Bulgaria	3–5	1929–31 Balkan Cup
