= Gheorghe Liliac =

Romanian footballer

Personal information
- Date of birth: 22 April 1959 (age 67)
- Place of birth: Dorohoi, Romania
- Height: 1.92 m (6 ft 4 in)
- Position: Goalkeeper

Youth career
- Cristalul Dorohoi

Senior career*
Years	Team	Apps	(Gls)
1974–1981	Cristalul Dorohoi		
1981–1983	CS Botoșani		
1983–1986	Steaua București	0	(0)
1983–1986	→ Bihor Oradea (loan)	44	(0)
1986–1987	Petrolul Ploiești	34	(0)
1987–1989	Steaua București	27	(0)
1989–1991	Petrolul Ploiești	59	(0)
1991–1993	Hapoel Tzafririm Holon	59	(0)
1995–1997	Metalul Filipești		
Total		223	(0)

International career
1986	Romania U21	2	(0)
1986–1987	Romania Olympic	5	(0)
1987–1990	Romania	4	(0)

Managerial career
- 2016–2017: Petrolul Ploiești (GK coach)
- 2017–2019: Petrolul Ploiești U19
- 2019–2024: Petrolul Ploiești (head of youth development)
- * Club domestic league appearances and goals

Gheorghe Liliac (born 22 April 1959) is a former Romanian professional footballer who played as a goalkeeper.

He was a member of the Romania national team that took part in the 1990 FIFA World Cup.

== Club career ==
Liliac was born on 22 April 1959 in Dorohoi, Romania and began playing junior-level football at local club Cristalul. He started to play at senior level for Cristalul during the 1974–75 Divizia C season. In 1981, he went to play for Divizia B club CS Botoșani. Liliac was noticed by coach Emerich Jenei, who brought him to Steaua București in 1983, where he had to compete for a place in the team with goalkeepers such as Vasile Iordache and Helmut Duckadam. His stint at Steaua was short, as he was loaned to Bihor Oradea, where he made his Divizia A debut on 28 August 1983 under coach Gheorghe Dărăban, keeping a clean sheet in a 0–0 draw against FC Baia Mare. After Bihor suffered relegation at the end of the 1985–86 season, Liliac joined Petrolul Ploiești, where he was wanted by coach Mircea Dridea. After only one season in which he played in all 34 league matches, Liliac left Petrolul to rejoin Steaua. There, he played 22 league matches under coach Anghel Iordănescu in his first season, being first choice goalkeeper in front of Dumitru Stângaciu, as the team won the title. During the same season, he played seven matches in the 1987–88 European Cup campaign, helping Steaua reach the semi-finals where they were defeated 2–0 on aggregate by Benfica. In the following season, Iordănescu chose Silviu Lung to be the first-choice goalkeeper, giving Liliac only five league matches as the team won The Double. Steaua also reached the 1989 European Cup final, where they lost 4–0 to Milan, without Liliac playing in any matches in the campaign. In 1989, he went back to Petrolul. There, he played in both legs of the 4–0 aggregate loss to Anderlecht in the first round of the 1990–91 UEFA Cup. He made his last Divizia A appearance on 23 June 1991 in Petrolul's 2–1 away loss to Steaua, totaling 164 matches in the competition. Subsequently, Liliac went for a two-season spell at Israeli first-tier side Hapoel Tzafririm Holon. Liliac ended his career after playing in the Romanian lower leagues for Metalul Filipești, managing to help the team gain promotion to Divizia C at the end of the 1995–96 season, retiring in 1997.

== International career ==
From 1986 to 1987, Liliac played several matches for Romania's under-21 and Olympic national teams.

Liliac played four friendly matches for Romania, making his debut on 8 April 1987, when coach Emerich Jenei sent him on at halftime to replace Silviu Lung in a 3–2 victory against Israel. His last appearance for the national team took place on 25 April 1990 in another victory against Israel, this time by a score of 4–1. Liliac was selected by Jenei to be part of the 1990 World Cup squad, but did not play in a single game there.

== Career statistics ==
=== International ===
Appearances and goals by national team and year
National team	Year	Apps	Goals
Romania	1987	1	0
Romania	1988	0	0
Romania	1989	0	0
Romania	1990	3	0
Total		4	0

== Honours ==
Steaua București

- Divizia A: 1987–88, 1988–89
- Cupa României: 1988–89

Metalul Filipești

- Divizia D - Prahova County: 1995–96
