= Iosif Magöry =

Romanian footballer

Personal information
- Date of birth: 1904
- Position: Defender

Senior career*
Years	Team	Apps	(Gls)
1926–1928	Gloria Arad		

International career
1927	Romania	1	(0)
- * Club domestic league appearances and goals

Iosif Magöry (1904 – date of death unknown) was a Romanian footballer who played as a defender.

== International career ==
Iosif Magöry played one friendly match for Romania, on 19 June 1927 under coach Teofil Morariu in a 3–3 against Poland.
