= Dumitru Vețianu =

Romanian footballer

Personal information
- Date of birth: 1900
- Position: Defender

Senior career*
Years	Team	Apps	(Gls)
1922–1925	Venus București		
1925–1928	Juventus București		

International career
1923	Romania	1	(0)
- * Club domestic league appearances and goals

Dumitru Vețianu (born 1900, date of death unknown) was a Romanian footballer who played as a defender.

== International career ==
Dumitru Vețianu played one match for Romania in which he was captain, on 26 October 1923 under coach Constantin Rădulescu in a friendly which ended 2–2 against Turkey.
