= Francisc Szekely =

Romanian footballer

Personal information
- Date of birth: 1897
- Date of death: 1962 (aged 64–65)
- Position: Midfielder

Senior career*
Years	Team	Apps	(Gls)
1924–1927	Stăruința Oradea		

International career
1925–1926	Romania	2	(0)
- * Club domestic league appearances and goals

Francisc Szekely (1897 – 1962) was a Romanian footballer who played as a midfielder.

== International career ==
Francisc Szekely played two friendly matches for Romania, making his debut on 31 May 1925 under coach Teofil Morariu in a 4–2 away victory against Bulgaria. His second game was a 6–1 home victory against Bulgaria.
