= Iosif Szilagyi =

Romanian footballer

Personal information
- Date of birth: 1900
- Position: Striker

Senior career*
Years	Team	Apps	(Gls)
1922–1924	Unirea Timișoara		

International career
1923	Romania	1	(0)
- * Club domestic league appearances and goals

Iosif Szilagyi (born 1900, date of death unknown) was a Romanian footballer who played as a striker.

== International career ==
Iosif Szilagyi played one friendly match for Romania, on 2 September 1923 under coach Teofil Morariu in a 1–1 against Poland.
