= Stanislav Micinski =

Romanian footballer

Personal information
- Date of birth: 1 November 1899
- Date of death: 7 January 1955 (aged 55)
- Position: Striker

Senior career*
Years	Team	Apps	(Gls)
1921–1923	Polonia Cernăuți		

International career
1922	Romania	1	(0)
- * Club domestic league appearances and goals

Stanislav Micinski (1 November 1899 – 7 January 1955) was a Romanian footballer who played as a striker.

== International career ==
Stanislav Micinski played one match for Romania, on 3 September 1922 under coach Teofil Morariu in a friendly which ended 1–1 against Poland.
