= List of football clubs in Romania by county =

On this page you can find all the Romanian clubs that have played in the national leagues in Romania(liga I, II, III), Austria-Hungary/Hungary(liga 1, 2, 3), the Ottoman Empire, Bulgaria or the Russian Empire, by place of residence.

On the first column the first name as the founding name in Romanian, on the second column the name as it appeared in the documents of the time(if the town did not belong to Romania at the time), on the third column the foundation date, in parentheses – the polisportive club, outside – the football section of the club and on fourth column the date the club was dissolved(if it is the case) and on the fifth column the best place they occupied in the highest league.

== Alba County ==
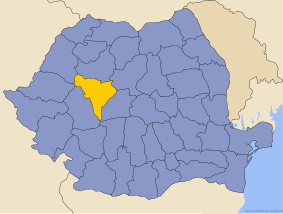

(Romanian)Name	Official/Initial Name	Foundation Date	Dissolved	Best place
CS Metalurgistul Cugir	Metalurgistul Cugir	1939	–	Liga II 5th
CS Ocna Mureș	Soda Ocna-Mureș	2018	–	Liga III 16th
Unirea Alba Iulia	Unirea Mihai Viteazul	1924	–	Liga I 6th

== Arad County ==
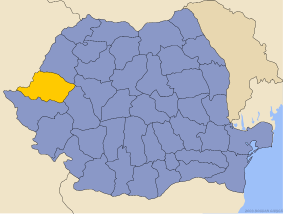

(Romanian)Name	Official/Initial Name	Foundation Date	Dissolved	Best place
ACB Ineu	AS Victoria Ineu	1920	–	Liga II 9th
ACU Arad	–	1995	2011	Liga II 13th
AMEFA Arad	Aradi Munkás Testedző Egylet(Arad Workers Sport Association)	1911	2006	Liga I 2nd
Asociația de Gimnastică Arad	Aradi Torna Egyesulet (Aradi TE)	(1879)1911	1919	Liga 2 2nd
Asociația Sportivă a Lucrătorilor Poștali și de Telegraf Arad	Aradi Posta-és Távírdatisztviselők Sport Egylete	1908	1910	Liga 2 6th
Cercul de Exerciții Arad	Aradi Testgyakorlók Köre	1906	1913	Liga 2 6th
Club Atletic Arad	Aradi Atlétikai Club; Aradi AC	(1899)1903		Liga 2 1st
Clubul de Gimnastică Arad	Aradi Torna Club	1899	–	
CS Crișul Chișineu-Criș	Strungul Chișineu Criș	1954	–	Liga III 2nd
Sport Club Arad	Aradi Sport Club	1910		Liga 2 5th
Gloria CFR Arad	Gloria Arad	1913	–	Liga I 2nd
CS Național Sebiș	Sebișana Sebiș	1922	–	Liga III 2nd
Progresul Pecica	Steaua Roșie Pecica	1949	–	Liga III: 4th
CS Șoimii Lipova	Șoimii Lipova	1974		Liga III: 1st
CS Șoimii Pâncota	Spartak Pâncota	1938	2016	Liga II 9th
FC UTA Arad	Intreprinderea Textile Arad	1945	–	Liga I 1st

== Argeș County ==
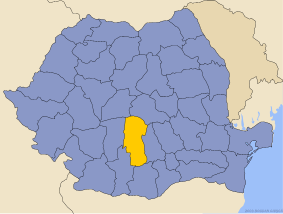

(Romanian)Name	Official/Initial Name	Foundation Date	Dissolved	Best place
FC Argeș Pitești	Dinamo Pitești	1953	–	Liga I 1st
FC Dacia Pitești	Metalul Colibași	1953	2001	Liga III(1993–94) 1st
CS Mioveni	AS Mioveni 2000	2000	2025	Liga I 16th
Inter Câmpulung	Muscelul Câmpulung	1947	–	Liga II 14th
Internațional Curtea de Argeș	Internațional Piteşti	2000	2011	Liga I 12th
ACS Unirea Bascov	AS Valea Ursului	2007	–	Liga III 9th

== Bacău County ==
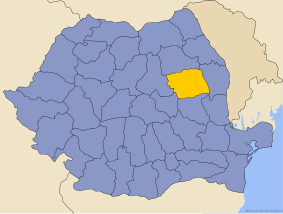

(Romanian)Name	Official/Initial Name	Foundation Date	Dissolved	Best place
CS Aerostar Bacău	Aripile Bacău	1977	–	Liga II 9th
FCM Bacău	Dinamo Bacău	1950	2020	Liga I 4th
CSM Borzești	–	1975	1994	Liga III 1st
FCM Dinamo Onești	–	1994	2015	Liga I 14th
ACS Gauss Bacău	Mesagerul Bacău	2006	–	Liga III 1st
CSM Moinești	Petrolul Moinești	1948	–	Liga III 1st

== Bihor County ==
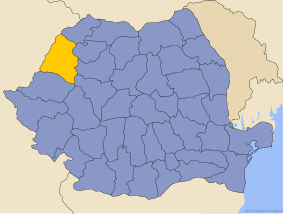

(Romanian)Name	Official/Initial Name	Foundation Date	Dissolved	Best place
Asociația de Gimnastică a Muncitorilor Stăruința Oradea	Törekvés Munkás Testedzők Egyesülete Nagyvárad	1912	1958	Liga I Quarterfinals
Asociația Sportivă Oradea	Nagyváradi Sport Egyesület	1906	1913	Liga 2 3rd
Club Atletic Oradea	Nagyváradi Atletic Club	1910	–	Liga I 1st, Liga 1 1st
Clubul de Gimnastică Căile Ferate Maghiare Oradea	Nagyváradi MÁV Torna Klub	1943	1945	Liga 2 3rd
Clubul de Scrimă Bihor	Bihari Vívók Clubja	1912	1914	Liga 2 6th
Crișana Oradea		1929	1954	Liga I 3–4th
Crișul Sântandrei		2009	–	Liga IV 1st
CS Bihorul Beiuș	Aurora Beiuș	1921	–	Liga III 9th
Lotus Băile Felix	CSC Sânmartin	2009	–	Liga III 6th
Luceafărul Oradea	–	2001	–	Liga II 8th
CS Oșorhei	Tricolorul Alparea	2000	–	Liga III 3rd
Fotbal Club Bihor Oradea	Crișul Oradea	1958	2016	Liga I 7th
Fotbal Club Bihor Oradea (2022)	Crisul Oradea	2022	–	Liga III 1st
Înţelegerea Oradea	Nagyváradi Egyetértés SC	1912	1941	Liga 2 8th
Liberty Oradea	Liberty Salonta	2003	2017	Liga II 1st
Olimpia Salonta	Nagyszalontai SC	1911	–	Liga III 2nd
Sport Club Oradea	Nagyváradi Sport Club	1912	1914	Liga 2 5th

== Bistrița-Năsăud County ==
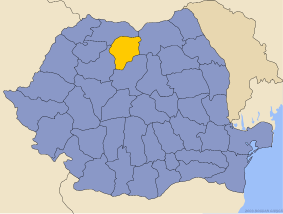

(Romanian)Name	Official/Initial Name	Foundation Date	Dissolved	Best place
ACF Gloria Bistrița	–	1922	2015	Liga I 3rd
Gloria Bistrița	1. FC Gloria	2018	–	Liga III 2nd
Hungarian Sports Association of Bistrița	Besztercei Magyar Sport Egylet	1942	1945	Liga 2 8th
Beclean Gimnastics Sport Association	Bethleni STE	1943	1945	Liga 312th

== Botoșani County ==
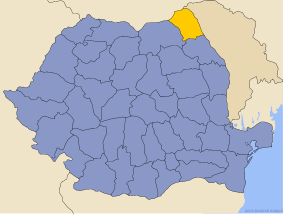

(Romanian)Name	Official/Initial Name	Foundation Date	Dissolved	Best place
FC Botoșani	CS Botoșani	2001	–	Liga I 4th
CS Dante Botoșani	–	2002	2023	Liga III 1st
FCM Dorohoi	–	2010	2015	Liga II 7th

== Brașov County ==
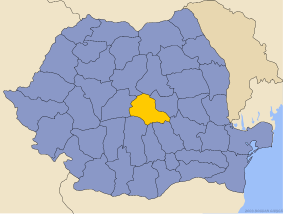

(Romanian)Name	Official/Initial Name	Foundation Date	Dissolved	Best place
Braşovia Braşov	–	1914	1937	Liga I Semi-final
CFR Braşov	–	1921	2013	Liga I 9th
Colțea Braşov	–	1920	–	Liga I 1st
Corona Braşov	–	2009	2021	Liga I 18th
CSM Făgăraș	Explosivi Făgăraș	1922	–	Liga II 4th
FC Braşov	Uzinele Astra Brașov	1936	2017	Liga I 2nd
FC Brașov (2021)	–	2021	2023	Liga II 7th
FC Forex Brașov	–	2002	2011	Liga II 2nd
FC Precizia Săcele	–	1950	–	Liga II 2nd
Olimpic Cetate Râșnov	FC Râșnov	1930	–	Liga III 7th
SR Brașov	–	2017	–	Liga III 2nd
Tractorul Brașov	Industria Aeronautică Română Brașov	1927	2006	Liga II 1st
CS Unirea Tărlungeni	–	1983	2017	Liga III 1st

== Brăila County ==
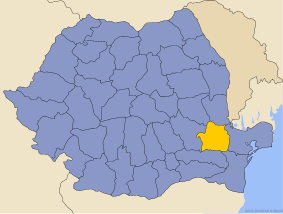

(Romanian)Name	Official/Initial Name	Foundation Date	Dissolved	Best place
CS Făurei	–	2002	–	Liga III 8th
Dacia Unirea Brăila	Dacia Brăila	1919	–	Liga I 13th
AS Brăilița 1928 Franco-Româna	Franco-Româna Brăila	1928	–	Liga II 1st
Viitorul Ianca	–	2003	–	Liga III 7th

== Bucharest ==

(Romanian)Name	Official/Initial Name	Foundation Date	Dissolved	Best place
Bukarester FC	–	1912	1916	Liga I 2nd
Carmen București	–	1922	2020	liga I 2nd
Colentina București	–	1909	1947	liga I 1st
Colțea București	–	1913	1938	Liga I 3rd
Daco-Getica București	Juventus Colentina București	1992	–	Liga I 14th
FC Dinamo București	Ciocanul București	1948	–	Liga I 1st
Faur București	Metalul București	1935	2005	Liga I 13th
FCSB	FC Steaua București	2003	–	Liga I 1st
Ciocanul București	Maccabi București	1919	1948	Liga I 7th
Metaloglobus București	–	1923	–	Liga I 7th
Olympia București	–	1904	1946	1910–11 1st
Progresul București	B.N.R. București	1944	2009	Liga I
Progresul Spartac București	–	2014	–	Liga III 2nd
Rapid București	Asociația Culturală și Sportivă CFR București	1923	–	Liga I 1st
Rocar București	Asociaţia Sportivă a Uzinei de Autobuze București	1953	2009	1999–00 12th
Româno-Americană București	–	1906	1916	1914–15 1st
Sportul Studențesc București	Sporting Club Universitar Studenţesc București	1916	2017	Liga I 2nd
Steaua București	Asociația Sportivă a Armatei București	1947	–	Liga I 1st
Unirea Tricolor București	Teiul București	1914	1958	Liga I 1st
Venus București	–	1914	–	Liga I 1st
Victoria București	–	1949	1990	Liga I 3rd
Viitorul București	–	1962	1963	Liga I 14th

== Buzău County ==
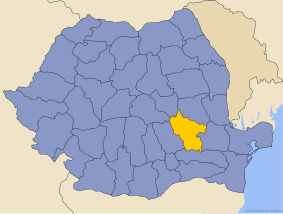

(Romanian)Name	Official/Initial Name	Foundation Date	Dissolved	Best place
FC Buzău	–	2016	–	Liga II 8th
FC Gloria Buzău	Clubul Sportiv Municipal Buzău	1973	2016	Liga I 5th
Metalul Buzău	AS Metalul Buzău	1954	–	Liga III 5th
CSM Râmnicu Sărat	Olimpia Râmnicu Sărat	1966	–	Liga II 17th

== Călărași County ==
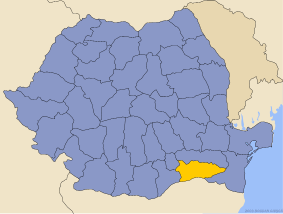

(Romanian)Name	Official/Initial Name	Foundation Date	Dissolved	Best place
Dunărea Călărași	Celuloza Călărași	1962	–	Liga I 13th
Înainte Modelu	–	2009	–	Liga III 6th
Prefab 05 Modelu	–	2005	2009	Liga II 4th
Mostiștea Ulmu	Phoenix Ulmu	2005	–	Liga III 2nd
CSM Oltenița	Șantierul Naval Oltenița	1948	–	Liga II 11th

== Caraș-Severin County ==
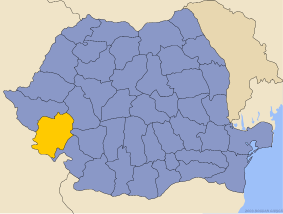

(Romanian)Name	Official/Initial Name	Foundation Date	Dissolved	Best place
CS Gloria Reșița	–	1951	2014	Liga II 4th
Muncitorul Reșița	–	1911	2017	Liga III 7th
CSM Reșița	Uzinele și Domeniile Reșița	1926	–	Liga I 1st
Viitorul Caransebeș	Scorilo Caransebeș	2006	2019	Liga II 8th

== Cernăuți County ==
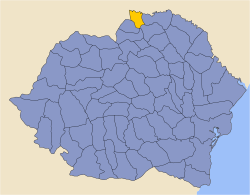

(Romanian)Name	Official/Initial Name	Foundation Date	Dissolved	Best place
Dragoş Vodă Cernăuţi	Rumänischer Fußballklub (RFK) Czernowitz (Romanian Football Club Cernauti)	1909	1946	Liga I SF (3rd–4th), Liga I 10th(division format)
Jahn Cernăuți	Czernowitzer Turn- und Sportverein Jahn(Sport and gymnastic society Jahn Cernăuți)	1903	1940	Liga I SF (3rd–4th)
Maccabi Cernăuți	Maccabi Czernowitz	1909	1941	Liga I SF (3rd–4th)
Polonia Cernăuți	Polonia Czernowitz	1910	1940	Liga I QF (5–8th)

== Cluj County ==
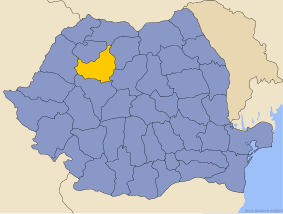

(Romanian)Name	Official/Initial Name	Foundation Date	Dissolved	Best place
Academia Comercială Cluj	Kolozsvári Kereskedelmi Akadémia Sportköre(Cluj Comercial Academy Sports Circle)	1905	1945	Liga 2 1st
CFR Cluj	Kolozsvári Vasutas Sport Club(Cluj Railroad Sports Club)	1907	–	Liga I 1st
Club Atletic Universitar Cluj	Kolozsvári Egyetemi Atlétikai Club(Cluj University's Sports Club)	(1902)1912	1945	Liga 2 4th
CSM Câmpia Turzii	Industria Sârmei Câmpia Turzii	1921	2021	1952 12th
AS Colegiul de Agricultură Cluj	Kolozsvári Mezőgazdasági Főiskolai SE(Cluj-Napoca Agricultural College SA)	1943	1945	Liga 2 13th
Corvin Cluj	Kolozsvári Korvin SE	1940	1945	Liga 2 11th
Dermata Cluj	Kolozsvári Bástya SE(Bastionul Cluj)	1937	1967	Liga I 11th
FC Cluj	Kolozsvári FC	1908	1910	Liga 2 4th
Ferar Cluj	Kolozsvári Atlétikai Club	(1880)1904	1948	Liga I 6th, Liga 2 1st
Muncitorul Cluj	Kolozsvári Munkás Testedző Egylet(Cluj Worker Training Association)	1912	1945	Liga 2 4th
AS Poștașul Cluj	Kolozsvári Postás Sport Egylet(Cluj Post Sports Association)	1941	1945	Liga 2 9th
Sănătatea Cluj	–	1986	–	Liga III 4th
Speranța Jucu	Unirea Jucu	1974	–	Liga IV 1st
Sticla Arieșul Turda	Muncitorul Turda	1907	–	Liga II 6th
Unirea Dej	–	1921	–	Liga II 9th
Unirea Jucu	–	1974	–	Liga III 4th
Universitatea Cluj	Societatea Sportivă a Studenților Universitari Cluj	1919	–	Liga I 2nd
Victoria Cluj	–	1920	2022	Liga I 2nd

== Constanța County ==
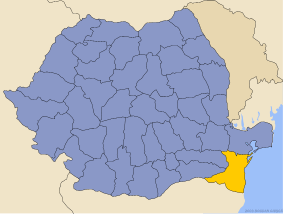

(Romanian)Name	Official/Initial Name	Foundation Date	Dissolved	Best place
Axiopolis Cernavodă	Mercur Cernavodă	1927	–	Liga III 4th
Callatis Mangalia	Metalul Mangalia	1962	2015	Liga II 9th
FCV Farul Constanța	Serviciul Porturi Maritime(Maritime Port Services) – SPM Constanța	1920	–	Liga I 5th
CS Medgidia	Cimentul Medgidia (Medgidia Cement)	1952	–	Liga II 12th
CS Năvodari	–	1993	–	Liga II 2nd
CSO Ovidiu	–	2004	–	Liga III 2nd
CS Portul Constanța	SPT Constanța	1930	–	Liga II 11th
Săgeata Năvodari	–	2010	2015	Liga I 17th
FC Unirea Constanța	–	2021	2023	Liga II
Viitorul Constanța	–	2009	2021	2016–17 1st

== Covasna County ==
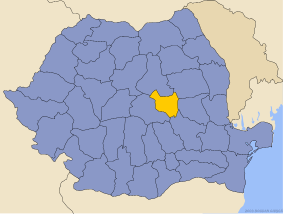

(Romanian)Name	Official/Initial Name	Foundation Date	Dissolved	Best place
KSE Târgu Secuiesc	Kézdivásárhelyi Sportegyesület(Târgu Secuiesc Sports Association)	1912	–	Liga III 3rd
Sepsi OSK Sfântu Gheorghe	–	2011	–	2016–17 4th

== Dâmbovița County ==
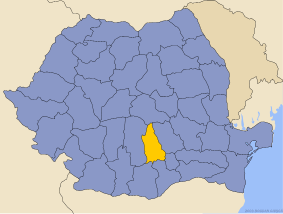

(Romanian)Name	Official/Initial Name	Foundation Date	Dissolved	Best place
Chindia Târgoviște	–	2010	–	2016–17 7th
Cimentul Fieni	–	1936	2005	Liga II 2nd
Flacăra Moreni	Astra Moreni	1922	–	1988–89 4th
FC Pucioasa	FC Aninoasa	1985	–	Liga III 11th
FCM Târgoviște	–	1948	2018	Liga I 7th

== Dolj County ==
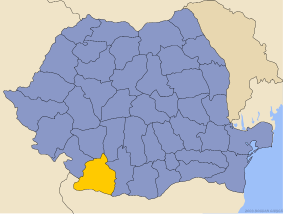

(Romanian)Name	Official/Initial Name	Foundation Date	Dissolved	Best place
FC Craiova	–	1940	1949	Liga I 9th
CSO Filiași	–	2008	–	Liga III 5th
CS Universitatea Craiova	–	1948	–	1990–91 1st
FC U Craiova 1948	–	1991	–	Liga I 2nd

== Durostor County ==
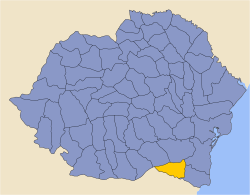

(Romanian)Name	Official/Initial Name	Foundation Date	Dissolved	Best place
FC Dristor	Strela Silistra	1902	–	Liga III 12th

== Galați County ==
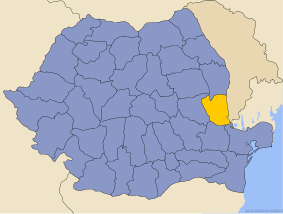

(Romanian)Name	Official/Initial Name	Foundation Date	Dissolved	Best place
Avântul Valea Mărului	–	2011	–	Liga III 14th
Constructorul Galați	–	1950	1975	Liga II 14th
Dacia Vasile Alecsandri Galați	–	1922	1950	Liga I QF (5–8)
CSU Dunărea de Jos Galați	–	1953	2020	Liga II 4th
FCM Dunărea Galați	FC Galați	1970	2014	Liga I 18th
Gloria CFR Galați	ASC Galaţi	1932	1970	Liga I 10th
FC Metalosport Galați	–	1937	2018	Liga II 1st
Oțelul Galați	–	1964	–	Liga I 1st
Sporting Liești	–	2012	–	Liga III 8th

== Giurgiu County ==
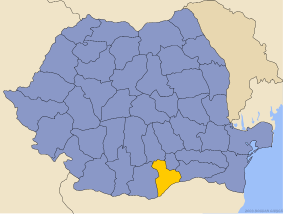

(Romanian)Name	Official/Initial Name	Foundation Date	Dissolved	Best place
Astra Giurgiu	Clubul Sportiv Astra-Română	1921	2022	Liga I 1st
Dunărea Giurgiu	FC Dunărea Giurgiu	1948	–	Liga II 5th

== Gorj County ==
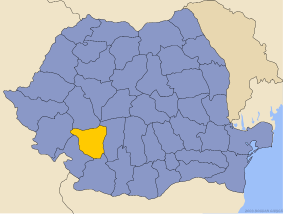

(Romanian)Name	Official/Initial Name	Foundation Date	Dissolved	Best place
Pandurii Târgu Jiu	–	1962	2022	Liga I 2nd
Gilortul Târgu Cărbunești	FC Dunărea Giurgiu	1976	–	Liga III 12th
Minerul Motru	Minerul Horăști	1962	–	Liga II 4th
Viitorul Târgu Jiu	AS Șirineasa	1998	2024	Liga II 7th

== Harghita County ==
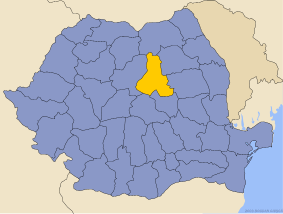

(Romanian)Name	Official/Initial Name	Foundation Date	Dissolved	Best place
FK Miercurea Ciuc	Csíkszereda	1904	–	Liga II 5th
Odorheiu Secuiesc	Textila Odorheiu Secuiesc	1922	–	Liga II 17th

== Hunedoara County ==
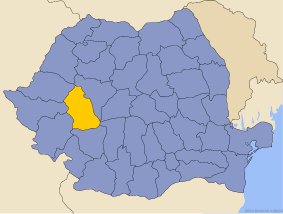

(Romanian)Name	Official/Initial Name	Foundation Date	Dissolved	Best place
Aurul Brad	Mica Brad	1934	–	Liga I 5th
CSM Deva	Mureșul Deva	1921	–	Liga II 4th
CFR Simeria	Piski Vasutas Sport Egylet (in Hungarian) – Asociația Sportivă Feroviară din Simeria(in Romanian)	1909	–	Liga III 3rd
Corvinul 2005 Hunedoara	–	2005	2008	2005–06 Divizia B 6th
FC Corvinul Hunedoara	Fero Sport Hunedoara	1921	2004	Liga I 3rd
Dacia Orăștie	–	1935	–	Liga II 11th
CS Hunedoara	–	2009	–	Liga III 2nd
Jiul Petroșani	CAM Petroșani	1919	–	Liga I 2nd
Minerul Lupeni	–	1920	–	Liga I 2nd
Minerul Uricani	–	1957	–	Liga III 2nd
Paroșeni Vulcan	Minerul Paroșeni	1970	1997	Liga II 6th
CSM Vulcan	Minerul Vulcan	1921	–	Liga III 14th

== Ialomița County ==
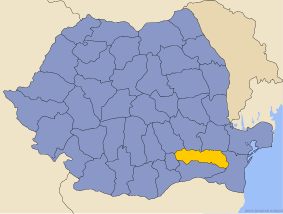

(Romanian)Name	Official/Initial Name	Foundation Date	Dissolved	Best place
CSM Fetești	Locomotiva CFR Fetești	1945	–	Liga III 3rd
Unirea Slobozia	Unirea Slobozia	1955	–	Liga II 2nd
FC Unirea Urziceni	Aurora Urziceni	1954	–	Liga I 1st
Viitorul Axintele	–	2002	–	Liga III 6th

== Iași County ==
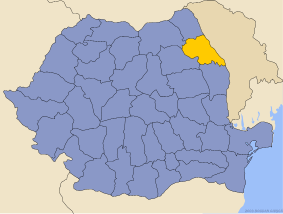

(Romanian)Name	Official/Initial Name	Foundation Date	Dissolved	Best place
CSM Pașcani	CFR Pașcani	1921	–	Liga II 5th
Poli Iași (1945)	Sportul Studențesc Iași	1945	2010	Liga I 6th
Poli Iași (2010)	ACSMU Politehnica Iași	2010	2026	Liga I 6th
Știința Miroslava	–	2009	–	Liga II 17th

== Ilfov County ==
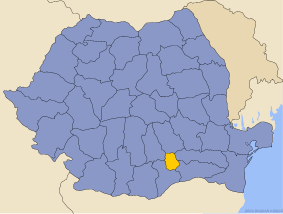

(Romanian)Name	Official/Initial Name	Foundation Date	Dissolved	Best place
Academica Clinceni	CS Buftea	2005	–	Liga I 5th
CS Afumați	Sportul Studențesc Iași	1996	–	Liga II 5th
CS Balotești	ACSMU Politehnica Iași	2006	–	Liga II 6th
ACS Berceni		2008	2022	Liga II 5th
CS Brănești	Victoria Brănești	1968	–	Liga II 1st
CS Concordia Chiajna	–	1957	–	Liga I 9th
CS Otopeni	–	2001	2013	Liga I 17th
SC Popești-Leordeni	CS Popești-Leordeni	2011		Liga III 5th
AS Sportul 30 Decembrie	Argeșul 30 Decembrie	1950	1992	Liga II 6th
CS Sportul Snagov	Damila Măciuca	2007	2020	Liga II 3rd
CS Tunari	Arsenal Tunari	1980		Liga III 3rd
CS Unirea Tărlungeni	–	1983	2017	Liga II 4th
FC Victoria Brănești	–	1968	–	Liga I 16th
AS Voința Snagov	CS Snagov	1997	–	Liga II 12th
FC Voluntari	–	2010	–	Liga I 9th

== Lăpușna County ==
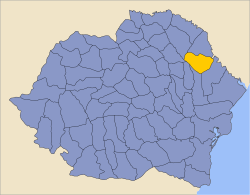

(Romanian)Name	Official/Initial Name	Foundation Date	Dissolved	Best place
Fulgerul CFR Chișinău	–	1920	1940	Liga I SF (3rd–4th)
Mihai Viteazul Chișinău	–	1920	1940	Liga I SF (3rd–4th)

== Maramureș County ==
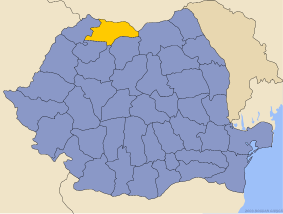

(Romanian)Name	Official/Initial Name	Foundation Date	Dissolved	Best place
ACSF Comuna Recea	–	2013	–	Liga II 14th
FC Maramureș Universitar Baia Mare	–	2010	2013	Liga II 11th
Minaur Baia Mare	CSM Baia Mare	1927	–	Liga I 4th
Minerul Cavnic	–	1934	2017	Liga II 6th
Phoenix Baia Mare	–	1932	2000	Liga I 5th
CIL Sighetu Marmației	–	1936	1991	Liga II 16th
CSM Sighetu Marmației	Marmația Sighetu Marmației	1996	–	Liga III 4th

== Mehedinți County ==
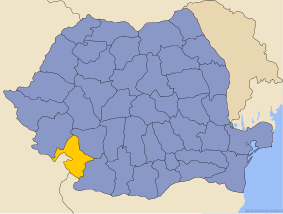

(Romanian)Name	Official/Initial Name	Foundation Date	Dissolved	Best place
CS Building Vânju Mare	–	2002	2009	Liga II 12th
FC Drobeta-Turnu Severin	–	1958	2011	Liga II 2nd
CS Minerul Mehedinți	CSM Baia Mare	1994	2015	Liga III 3rd
CS Turnu Severin	CS Gaz Metan Severin	2007	2013	Liga I 3rd

== Mureș County ==
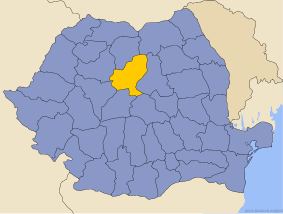

(Romanian)Name	Official/Initial Name	Foundation Date	Dissolved	Best place
Asociația Sportivă Ardealul Târgu Mureș	FCM Târgu Mureș	2008	2018	Liga I 2nd
Asociația Sportivă Armata Târgu Mureș	–	1962	–	Liga I 2nd
Avântul Reghin	Foresta Reghin	1949	–	Liga I 13th
FC Gaz Metan Târgu Mureș	CS Gaz Metan Severin	2007	2013	Liga III 2nd
Mureșul Târgu Mureș		1921	1964	Liga I SF (3rd–4th)
CS Târgu Mureș	ASM Târgu Mureș	1944	1960	Liga I 4th

== Neamț County ==
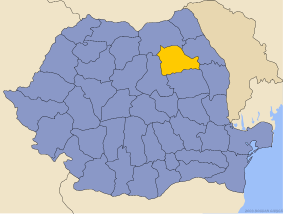

(Romanian)Name	Official/Initial Name	Foundation Date	Dissolved	Best place
Ceahlăul Piatra Neamț	Ozana Târgu Neamț	1919	–	Liga I 4th
Ozana Târgu Neamț	–	1974	–	Liga II 4th
CSM Roman	Laminorul Roman	1954	–	Liga II 5th

== Olt County ==
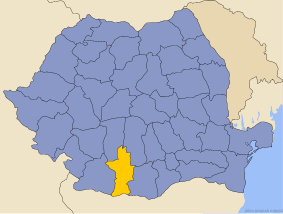

(Romanian)Name	Official/Initial Name	Foundation Date	Dissolved	Best place
FC Caracal	Metalul Craiova	1949	2013	Liga I 3rd
FC Olt Scornicești	Viitorul Scornicești	1972	–	Liga I 4th
FC Olt Slatina	Alro Slatina	2006	2015	Liga II 5th
FC Progresul Caracal	Răsăritul Caracal	1924	2004	Liga II 13th
CSM Slatina	–	2009	–	Liga II 4th
CS Vedița Colonești	Laminorul Roman	1982	2025	Liga III 1st

== Prahova County ==
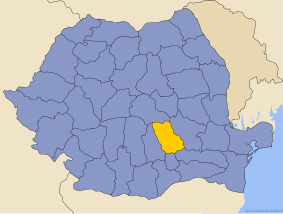

(Romanian)Name	Official/Initial Name	Foundation Date	Dissolved	Best place
CS Brazi	Chimia Brazi	1968	–	Liga II 17th
FCM Câmpina	Astra Câmpina	1936	2008	Liga II 2nd
AFC Fortuna Poiana Câmpina	Fortuna Brazi	2012	2015	Liga I 11th
Petrolistul Boldești	Alro Slatina	1947	–	Liga III 2nd
FC Petrolul Ploiești	FC Juventus București	1924	–	Liga I 1st
FC Ploiești	Tricolor Ploieşti	1922	1949	Liga I 8th
FC Prahova Ploiești	United Ploiești	1909	2021	Liga I 1st
CSO Tricolorul Breaza	–	1971	–	Liga II 16th
FC Unirea Câmpina	–	2004	2013	Liga III 3rd

== Sălaj County ==
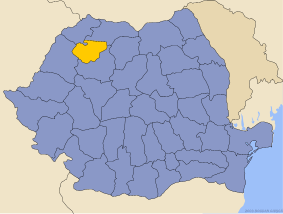

(Romanian)Name	Official/Initial Name	Foundation Date	Dissolved	Best place
Armătura Zalău	Unirea Zalău	1970	–	Liga II 4th
Dinamo Zalău	–		–	Liga III 14th
CS Sportul Șimleu Silvaniei	FC Silvania Șimleu Silvaniei	2007	–	Liga III 2nd
C.S. Zalău	–		–	Liga III 9th
FC Zalău	–	2005	2017	Liga III 4th
SCM Zalău	–	2019	–	Liga III 2nd

== Satu Mare County ==
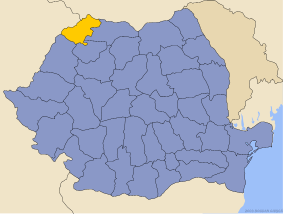

(Romanian)Name	Official/Initial Name	Foundation Date	Dissolved	Best place
AS Satu Mare	Szatmári Sport Egylet(Satu Mare Sport Association)	1920	–	Liga 2 6th
AS CFR Satu Mare	Szatmári Vasutas SE(Satu Mare Railway SE)	1940	1945	Liga 3 5th
ASG Satu Mare	Szatmári Torna és Vívó Egylet(Satu Mare Gymnastics and Fencing Association)	1912	–	Liga III 3rd
Barkochba Satu Mare	Szatmárnémeti Barkochba	1940	1941	Liga 3 5th
CSM Satu Mare	Unirea Zalău	(2007)2018	–	Liga III 8th
FC Olimpia Satu Mare	–	1921	–	Liga I 9th
CS Oașul Negrești-Oaș	Energia Negrești-Oaș	1969	–	Liga II 8th
Năzuința Satu Mare	Szatmárnémeti Törekvés(Satu Mare Aspiration)	1940	1945	Liga 3 4th

== Sibiu County ==
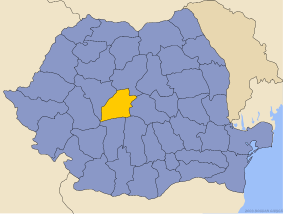

(Romanian)Name	Official/Initial Name	Foundation Date	Dissolved	Best place
Gaz Metan Mediaș	Karres Mediaș	1945	2022	Liga I 6th
ACS Mediaș	–	2022	–	Liga IV 1st
FC Hermannstadt	–	2015	2026	Liga I 8th
FC Inter Sibiu	Independența Sibiu	1968	–	Liga I 4th
Măgura Cisnădie	Textila Cisnădie	1969	–	Liga 3 2nd
FC Sibiu	Unirea Zalău	2003	2007	Liga II 2nd
Societatea Gimnastică Sibiu	Hermannstädter Turnverein – HATV(Gymnastics Society Sibiu)	(1862)1919	1945	Liga I 2nd
Șoimii Sibiu(Falcons Sibiu)	Szatmárnémeti Törekvés(Satu Mare Aspiration)	1913	2001	Liga I SF (3–4th), Liga I 7th
CSC 1599 Șelimbăr	Viitorul Șelimbăr	2016	–	Liga III 1st
CSU Voința Sibiu	–	1965	2012	Liga I 16th
LSS Voința Sibiu	–	2013	–	Liga IV 3rd

== Suceava County ==
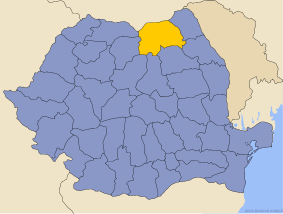

(Romanian)Name	Official/Initial Name	Foundation Date	Dissolved	Best place
CSM Bucovina Rădăuți	Progresul Rădăuți	1956	–	Liga III 1st
CA Câmpulung Moldovenesc	CS Armata (Army Sports Club)	1948	1953	Liga I 3rd
FC Cetatea Suceava	Independența Sibiu	2004	2010	Liga II 14th
Foresta Fălticeni	Avântul Fălticeni	1954	2003	Liga I 13th
Foresta Suceava	CFR Ițcani	1946	2024	Liga II 10th
FC Pojorâta	Hermannstädter Turnverein – HATV (Gymnastics Society Sibiu)	1950	–	Liga II 11th
ACS Șomuz Fălticeni	–	2010	–	Liga II 11th
ACS Sporting Suceava	–	2008	2014	Liga III 5th
CSM Suceava	Progresul Suceava	1957	1997	Liga I 18th

== Teleorman County ==
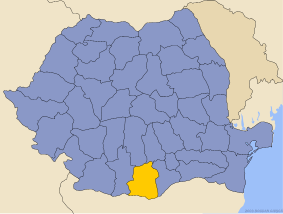

(Romanian)Name	Official/Initial Name	Foundation Date	Dissolved	Best place
CSM Alexandria	Unirea Alexandria	1948	–	Liga II 3rd
CSM Cetatea Turnu Măgurele	Chimia Turnu Măgurele	1962	–	Liga II 9th
AFC Turris-Oltul Turnu Măgurele	Voința Saelele	1965	2021	Liga II 4th
CS Sporting Roșiori	–	2008	–	Liga III 3rd

== Timiș County ==
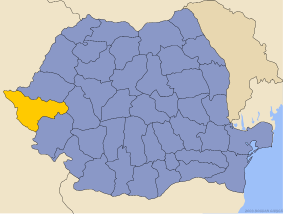

(Romanian)Name	Official/Initial Name	Foundation Date	Dissolved	Best place
Banatul Timișoara	–	1923	1950	Liga I SF (3–4th)
CFR Timișoara	Sparta CFR Timișoara	1933	–	Liga I 2nd
Chinezul Timișoara	Temesvári Kinizsi SE(Timișoara Chinezul Sports Association)	1910	1946	Liga II 1st
CSC Dumbrăvița	–	2009	–	Liga III 3rd
Electrica Timișoara	–	1929	–	Liga III 5th
ACS Fortuna Becicherecu Mic	–	2016	–	Liga III 3rd
ACS Fortuna Covaci	–	1973	2017	Liga II 15th
Industria Lânii Societate Anonimă Timișoara	–	1922	1936	Liga II 1st
CSM Lugoj	Vulturii Lugoj	1920	–	Liga I 7th
CS Nuova Mama Mia Becicherecu Mic	–	2002	2018	Liga III 2nd
ACS Poli Timișoara	ACS Recaș	2012	2021	Liga I 11th
FC Politehnica Timișoara	Societatea Sportiva Politehnica	1921	2012	Liga I 2nd
SSU Politehnica Timișoara	–	2012	–	Liga I 6th
ACS Recaș	–	1917	2012	Liga II 2nd
FC Ripensia Timișoara	–	1928	2023	Liga I 1st
CA Timișoara	–	1902	1936	Liga 2 1st, Liga II 6th
CAM Timișoara	–	1936	1949	Liga I 5th
Uzinele Mecanice Timișoara	UMT	1960	2008	Liga I 16th
CS Unirea Sânnicolau Mare	–	1957	–	Liga III 1st

== Tulcea County ==
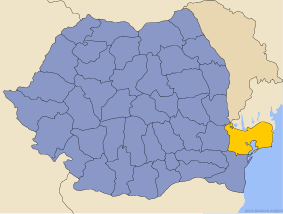

(Romanian)Name	Official/Initial Name	Foundation Date	Dissolved	Best place
FC Delta Tulcea	–	1973	-	Liga II 1st
ACS Săgeata Stejaru	–	1960	2022	Liga III 5th

== Vâlcea County ==
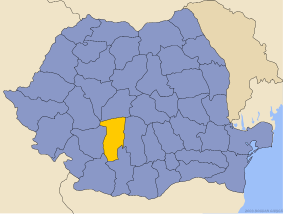

(Romanian)Name	Official/Initial Name	Foundation Date	Dissolved	Best place
Chimia Râmnicu Vâlcea	–	1946	2004	Liga I 8th
SCM Râmnicu Vâlcea	CSM Râmnicu Vâlcea	2004	–	Liga III 1st
ACS Flacăra Horezu	Minerul Horezu	1963	–	Liga III 3rd

== Vaslui County ==
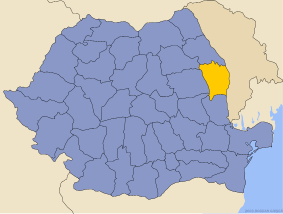

(Romanian)Name	Official/Initial Name	Foundation Date	Dissolved	Best place
AFC Atletico Vaslui	–	2014	2017	Liga III 11th
FC Bârlad	–	2005	2009	Liga III 6th
ACS Hușana Huși	–	1968	–	Liga III 5th
CS Sporting Vaslui	Fotbal Club Vaslui	2002	–	Liga I 2nd
AS Viitorul Vaslui	Inter Vaslui	1976	1990	Liga II 15th
CSM Vaslui	–	2018	–	Liga IV 1st

== Vrancea County ==
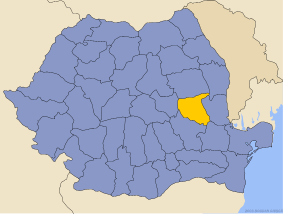

(Romanian)Name	Official/Initial Name	Foundation Date	Dissolved	Best place
CSM Focșani	Spartac Focșani	1953	–	Liga II 16th
