= Ion Lăpușneanu =

Romanian footballer

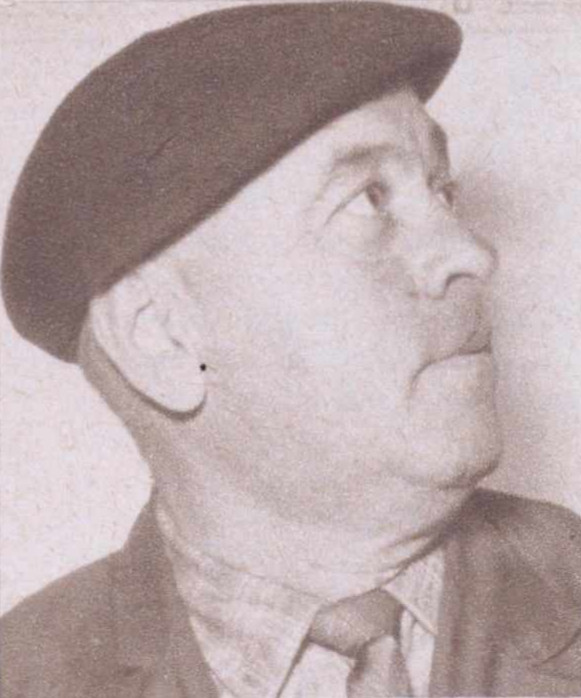
- Lăpușneanu in 1966

Personal information
- Date of birth: 8 December 1908
- Place of birth: Bucharest, Romania
- Date of death: 24 February 1994 (aged 85)
- Position: Goalkeeper

Senior career*
Years	Team	Apps	(Gls)
1926–1928	Venus București		
1928–1929	Banatul Timișoara		
1929–1930	Sportul Studențesc București		
1931–1935	Venus București	32	(0)
1935–1937	Rapid București	12	(0)
1937–1938	Gloria CFR Galați		
Total		44	(0)

International career
1929–1932	Romania	10	(0)

Managerial career
- 1942: Romania
- 1946–1948: Sporting Club Pitești
- 1948–1949: Politehnica Timișoara
- 1951–1952: Flacăra Petroșani
- 1953–1954: Dinamo Pitești
- 1955–1956: Dinamo Pitești
- 1958–1959: Dinamo Pitești
- * Club domestic league appearances and goals

Ion "Jean" Lăpușneanu (8 December 1908 – 24 February 1994) was a Romanian football goalkeeper.

== Club career ==
Lăpușneanu was born on 8 December 1908 in Bucharest, Romania and began playing football in 1926 at Venus București in the regional championship. After two years he joined Banatul Timișoara with which in the 1928–29 season he won the regional championship that helped them qualify for the national league where they were defeated with 3–0 by România Cluj in the semi-finals. Afterwards he went for one year at Sportul Studențesc București. Subsequently, Lăpușneanu returned to Venus in 1931, keeping a clean sheet in his first match, a 2–0 win over RGM Timișoara, making a total of 11 appearances by the end of the season as the team won the title. He won another title with Venus in the 1933–34 season when coach Karoly Weszter used him in seven games. In 1935, Lăpușneanu joined Rapid București where in his second season the team finished runner-up in the league and won the cup, but he did not play in the 5–1 win over Ripensia Timișoara in the final, as Petre Rădulescu was preferred in his place. After spending the 1937–38 season in Divizia B at Gloria CFR Galați, Lăpușneanu ended his playing career.

== International career ==
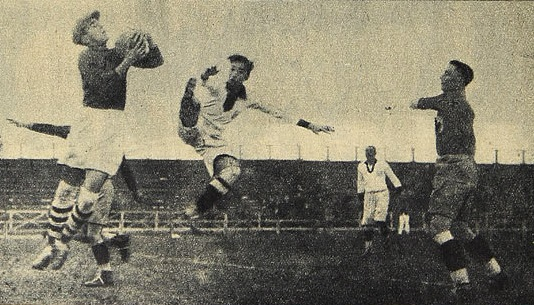
Lăpușneanu (left) playing for Romania against Peru at the 1930 World Cup

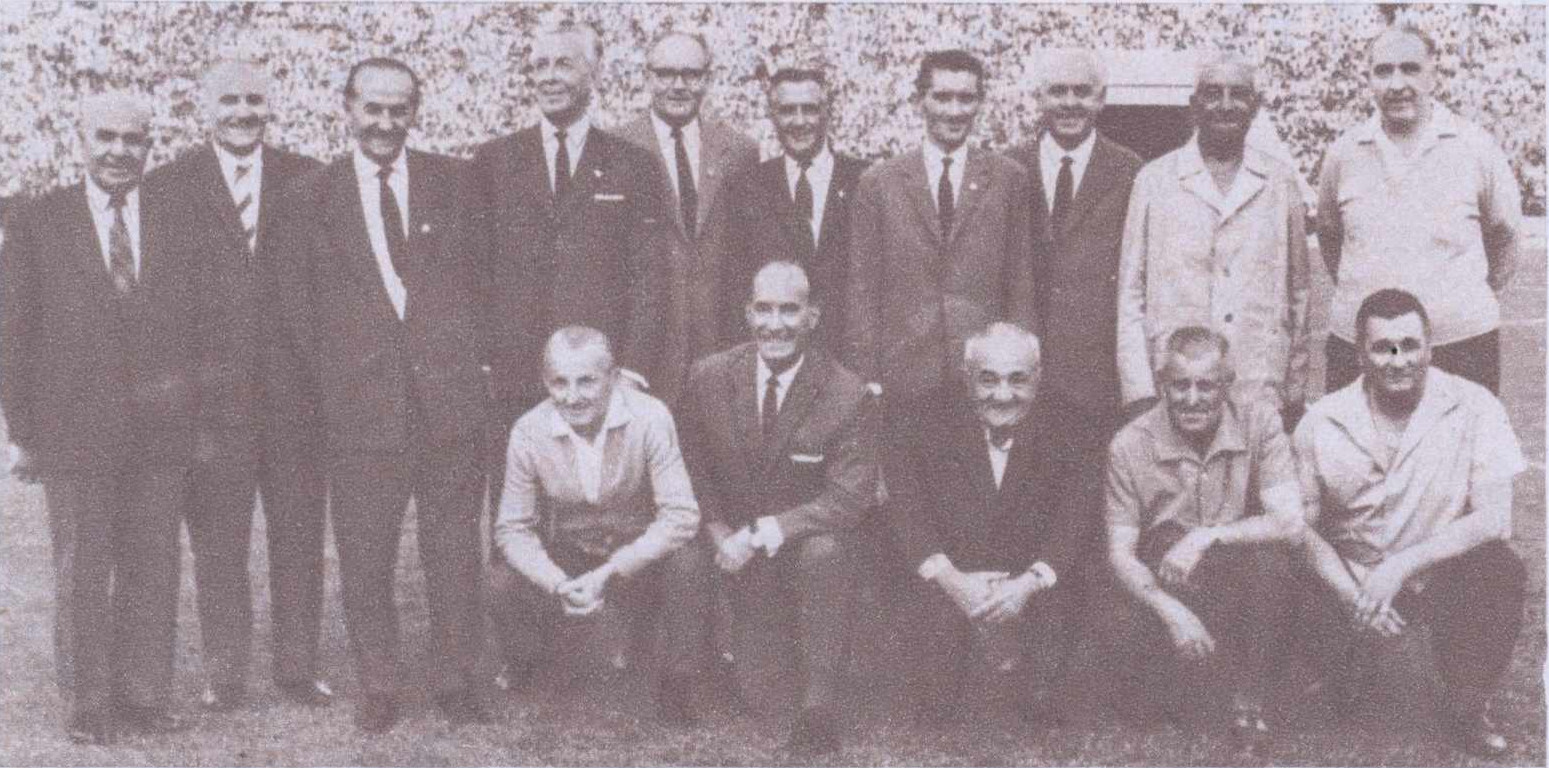
Lăpușneanu (standing, third from the right) in 1966

Lăpușneanu played 10 games for Romania, making his debut on 15 September 1929 under coach Constantin Rădulescu in a 3–2 friendly victory against Bulgaria. He played two games in the successful 1929–31 Balkan Cup, two in the 1932 Balkan Cup and one during the 1931–1934 Central European Cup for Amateurs. Lăpușneanu was selected by coach Rădulescu to be part of the team's 1930 World Cup squad in which he played in both of Romania's games, the 3–1 victory against Peru and the 4–0 loss to eventual tournament winners Uruguay. His last game for the national team was a 5–0 friendly loss to Poland.

== Managerial career ==
In 1942, Lăpușneanu was coach of Romania's national team, leading them in three friendly games, a 7–0 loss to Germany, a 1–0 loss to Slovakia and a 2–2 draw against Croatia.

After coaching Sporting Club Pitești in the Romanian lower leagues for a while, he had his first coaching experience in the Romanian top-division Divizia A, leading Politehnica Timișoara in the 1948–49 season. Lăpușneanu made his debut on 22 August 1948 in a 3–1 win over Petrolul București, finishing the season in 10th place, thus avoiding relegation. He then coached Flacăra Petroșani in the 1951 and 1952 Divizia A seasons, preventing the team from being relegated in both instances.

In 1953 he had his first spell at newly founded club, Dinamo Pitești, helping the team finish the first season of its existence in 8th place in the regional championship. In 1955 he started his second spell at Dinamo, helping the club get promoted from the regional championship to Divizia C where in the following season the team finished in 8th place. Lăpușneanu had his third and final spell at Dinamo from 1958 until 1959, helping them get promoted once again from the regional championship to Divizia C.

== Writing ==
Lăpușneanu wrote a book about football titled Jocul și antrenamentul portarului de fotbal (The game and training of the football goalkeeper) which was released in 1968.

== Death ==
Lăpușneanu died on 24 February 1994 at age 85.

== Honours ==
=== Player ===
Venus București

- Divizia A: 1931–32, 1933–34

Rapid București

- Divizia A runner-up: 1936–37
- Cupa României: 1936–37

Romania

- Balkan Cup: 1929–31
- Central European International Cup: 1931–34

=== Manager ===
Dinamo Pitești

- County championship: 1955, 1958–59
