= Gheorghe Albu =

Romanian footballer and manager

Personal information
- Date of birth: 18 November 1909
- Place of birth: Arad, Austria-Hungary (now in Romania)
- Date of death: 26 June 1974 (aged 64)
- Place of death: Făgăraș, Brașov County, Romania
- Position: Defender

Youth career
- 1923–1924: Olimpia Micălaca
- 1924–1927: AMEF Arad

Senior career*
Years	Team	Apps	(Gls)
1927–1928	Gloria Arad		
1928–1929	Jiul Lupeni		
1929–1933	Gloria Arad		
1933–1940	Venus București	110	(6)
1940–1944	FC Craiova (Note: The 1940–41 Divizia A was the last season before World War II and the 1946–47 Divizia A was the first one after, so the appearances during this period for FC Craiova are not official.)	16	(6)
Total		126	(12)

International career
1931–1938	Romania	42	(0)

Managerial career
- 1945: ITA Arad (assistant)
- 1946–1947: FC Craiova
- 1947–1948: Dermata Cluj
- 1950: Romania
- 1952: Flamura Roșie Arad
- 1957–1958: Textila Sfântu Gheorghe
- 1958–1959: Foresta Fălticeni
- 1959–1962: AMEF Arad
- 1962–1964: Vagonul Arad
- 1964–1967: Chimia Făgăraș
- * Club domestic league appearances and goals

Gheorghe Albu (12 September 1909 – 26 June 1974) was a Romanian football player and manager. He participated with Romania's national team in the 1934 World Cup.

== Club career ==
Albu was born on 12 September 1909 in Arad, Austria-Hungary (now in Romania), and began playing football at the age of 14 at his neighborhood team Olimpia Micălaca. He then moved to AMEF Arad where he stayed until the autumn of 1927 when he went to Gloria Arad. After one year, he joined Jiul Lupeni, afterwards returning to Gloria Arad in 1929. In the 1929–30 season, he helped Gloria reach the championship final, where he played the entire match in the 3–0 loss to Juventus București.

In 1933, Albu joined Venus București, and in his first season, coach Karoly Weszter played him in nine games, scoring three goals as the club won the title. He won another title in the 1936–37 season, this time under the guidance of coach Ferenc Plattkó who gave him 22 appearances. Between 1938 and 1940, he helped the club win two consecutive league titles, both with coach Béla Jánosy, Albu contributing with 17 matches and three goals scored in the first one and only one appearance in the second. During his time with Venus, he also made four appearances in the Mitropa Cup over two editions, suffering first-round exits to Újpest and AGC Bologna.

Between 1940 and 1944, the year of his retirement, Albu played for FC Craiova, making his last Divizia A appearance on 8 June 1941 in a 0–0 draw against Gloria CFR Galați, totaling 138 matches with 12 goals in the competition.

== International career ==
Albu played 42 games for Romania, captaining 17 of them, making his debut on 10 May 1931 under coach Constantin Rădulescu in a 5–2 home win over Bulgaria in the successful 1929–31 Balkan Cup. There, he also played in victories against Yugoslavia and Greece. He would win another Balkan Cup in 1933, appearing in all three games which were victories against Bulgaria, Greece and Yugoslavia. During the 1931–1934 Central European Cup for Amateurs, Albu played in all six matches as he won his third tournament with The Tricolours.

Albu played in a 2–1 victory against Yugoslavia in the successful 1934 World Cup qualifiers. Subsequently, he was selected by coaches Josef Uridil and Rădulescu to be part of the final tournament squad in Italy, where he played the entire first-round match, a 2–1 defeat to eventual finalists, Czechoslovakia. Albu made his last appearance for the national team on 4 December 1938 in a 6–2 loss to Czechoslovakia in the friendly Eduard Benes' Cup.

== Managerial career ==
Albu started his coaching career in 1945 at newly founded club, ITA Arad, being the assistant of Francisc Dvorzsak. Afterwards, he became the head coach of FC Craiova, the team where he had ended his playing career, and they finished the 1946–47 Divizia A season in last place, resulting in relegation to Divizia B. In the following season he worked at Dermata Cluj in the same league, but they were also relegated.

In 1950 he was appointed head coach of Romania for one friendly game, a 3–3 draw against Poland. Afterwards he had his last spell in Divizia A, leading Flamura Roșie Arad to an 8th place in the 1952 season, totaling 74 matches as manager in the Romanian top-division, consisting of 28 victories, 23 draws and 23 losses.

In the following years, Albu worked at teams in the Romanian lower leagues such as Textila Sfântu Gheorghe, Foresta Fălticeni and Vagonul Arad. In 1964 he settled in Făgăraș, where many years he trained the senior and youth teams of Chimia Făgăraș.

== Death ==
Albu died on 26 June 1974 in Făgăraș at the age of 64.

== Honours ==
=== Player ===
Gloria Arad

- Divizia A runner-up: 1929–30

Venus București

- Divizia A: 1933–34, 1936–37, 1938–39, 1939–40

Romania

- Balkan Cup: 1929–31, 1933
- Central European International Cup: 1931–34
