= Atanasie Protopopesco =

Romanian multi-sports athlete and official (1900–1991)

Personal information
- Birth name: Atanasie Protopopescu
- Date of birth: 8 April 1900
- Place of birth: Bucharest, Kingdom of Romania
- Date of death: 22 February 1991 (aged 90)
- Position: Defender

Youth career
- 1914–?: Victoria Constanța
- 1919–1921: Tricolor Constanța

Senior career*
Years	Team	Apps	(Gls)
1921–1926	Tricolor București		
1926–1927	Unirea Tricolor București		
1927–1928	FC Politehnica Timișoara		
1928–?	Dragoș Vodă Cernăuți		

International career
1923	Romania	1	(0)
- * Club domestic league appearances and goals

Atanasie Protopopescu, known professionally as Protopopesco and colloquially as Tase Protopopescu (8 April 1900 – 22 February 1991), was a Romanian athlete and sports official, primarily noted for his achievements in association football (as both a defender and a referee), rugby union, and boxing. His first recorded participation in sports came during the 1910s: as an adolescent in Dobruja, he was involved with the amateur football club, Victoria of Constanța. Upon the end of World War I, young Protopopesco set up another such venue, Tricolor Constanța, and remained its occasional player into the late 1920s. Mostly based in Bucharest from 1921 to 1927, he played rugby for Sportul Studențesc, and football for Tricolor București, which became Unirea Tricolor under his chairmanship. He made his international debut in football during unofficial matches for team Bucharest, which was facing a similar squad representing Belgrade; meanwhile, he took at least one challenge cup with his rugby team.

Protopopesco's one match for the national football team was also Turkey's first-ever friendly (October 1923). He also had a stint on the Olympic squad for the 1924 Summer games—the only man on that team to have been born in the "Old Kingdom". In 1927, Protopopesco ended his affiliation with Unirea Tricolor, and played in regional leagues for FC Politehnica Timișoara and Dragoș Vodă. He made Cernăuți his permanent home, and the base for his activities as a referee. During the 1930s, he became involved in organizing boxing matches and training boxing referees.

Protopopesco returned to Bucharest during World War II; a staunch critic of the Romanian Football Federation and its educational system, he was validated in 1943, when he was made chairman of the Commission of Referees. He returned as a pundit during the communist era, stating his views on developments at the national squad. At the time of his death in 1991, he was the oldest-lived former Romanian international.

== Early life ==
Born on 8 April 1900, Protopopesco grew up playing a variety of sports, including rugby union, competitive swimming, and oină. The International Olympic Committee indicates his birthplace as Bucharest, though his debut in football occurred on the Black Sea, at Constanța. By his own account, in 1914 he set up the city's first local amateur club, Victoria (not directly related to the interwar Victoria Constanța). This claim is partly contradicted by football historian Gogu Cojocaru, who reports that Victoria was created in 1913 by Dan Alecu. Protopopesco was still present in the city after World War I. According to his own notes, he set up a new club, Tricolor, in 1919, serving as its chairman for the next two years.

In 1921, Protopopesco left for Bucharest, being appointed secretary of the athletics club Sportul Studențesc—where he played rugby. He was not registered with the sister football team, being instead co-opted by Tricolor București; throughout that period, his Constanța teammates continued to regard him as their honorary chairman. His story is again contrasted by Cojocaru's research: while he agrees that Protopopesco founded and chaired Tricolor Constanța, he sees the club as only existing from 1922.

In 1922–1923, Protopopesco appeared in unofficial friendlies opposing a Bucharest representative team to a similar squad from Belgrade. By his own account, these were "brilliant matches", as well as being the first international football events to be allowed after the war. The first took place on 9 April 1922 on the home ground, dubbed "La Șosea", drawing in some 6,000 to 7,000 spectators. It ended in a 2–2 draw, but, as Protopopesco observed, the Bucharest team was made up of substitutes from Tricolor, Colțea, Prahova, and Romcomit. The first squad had been composed mostly of FC Venus athletes, but they had quit after disputes with management. According to his fellow defender Nicolae Secăreanu (later famous as an opera singer), a rematch followed shortly after, with Belgrade winning 0–9.

== Football international ==
From May 1922, Protopopesco was secretary of the Sportul Studențesc association, under chairman Mihail Ghermănescu. In June, the Bucharest team, with Protopopesco and Secăreanu as the two defenders, traveled to Belgrade; they won the subsequent match 2–1, taking a golden Friendship Cup, presented by Alexander Karađorđević. In August, Protopopesco returned to Constanța and played briefly for its all-star team, facing his colleagues at Tricolor București in a 2–1 victory. The fixture was noted for the refusal of ethnic Greeks to play on the Constanța side.

In October, Protopopesco reached national prominence in rugby, winning with Sportul the challenge cup against the Bucharest Tennis Club. A clear win (13–0), it led one Dimineața journalist to proclaim him an "exquisite kicker". He was similarly praised by Rampa as "an admirable center-half" upon his return to the Bucharest Football League in March 1923. On 20 August, he and Tricolor won the Crețulescu–Ioniță Challenge Cup, defeating Elpis Constanța 2–3, and scoring one of the goals.

September 1923 came with another Bucharest–Belgrade friendly, though this time around the respective teams were clearly identified as Tricolor and BSK. Protopopesco was again praised in Rampa, which noted his "real progress", in that he no longer shot on sight, and collaborated better with midfielders. Protopopesco believed that his performances against the Belgrade squads made him worthy of the Romania national football team. He reportedly carried one of the earliest certificates as an international footballer, being registered therein as No. 1. He was simultaneously a referee, and on 21 October appeared as such at a Constanța match between city clubs Săgeata and Elpis.

Protopopesco was a left-back in one official game for Romania. This was an October 1923 friendly against Turkey, for which he traveled to Istanbul; ending 2–2, the game was especially significant for the Turkish side, which was debuting internationally. He was soon after replaced on that roaster by Attila Molnár, himself replaced within months by Ioan Krieshofer. In late May 1924, Protopopesco was made captain of Romania's Olympic football squad, which was preparing for the Summer games. As Protopopesco himself noted, he was the only player fielded to have been born in the "Old Kingdom", rather than in regions that had previously been under foreign rule (he was also implicitly the first Constanța-based footballer to play for any national squad). The same issue was discussed in a 1938 reportage by Silviu Herescu and M. Silvian, who further noted that all other players came from Timișoara (formerly in Austria-Hungary) and were generally not ethnic Romanians. Herescu and Silvian also propose that Protopopesco was only included for his Romanian-sounding surname, as he was otherwise inferior to his new colleagues.

The departure was mired in controversy, after rumors that manager Adrian Suciu had wanted to withdraw the squad from the competition, and had been labeled a national traitor by various Bucharest papers. After a 6–0 loss to The Netherlands, Protopopesco had his own dispute with Suciu, whom he regarded as incompetent.

== Unirea Tricolor and relocations ==
Like all his Olympic teammates, Protopopesco paid for his trip to and from Paris out of his own pocket. Part of the money came from an additional fixture arranged by Suciu in Vienna, where the Romanians were defeated 4–0 by Austria. In late July 1924, he traveled with Săgeata into the Kingdom of Bulgaria. At Varna, the visiting team had a 4–0 loss to Diana. He covered this encounter in an article for Dobrogea Jună, expressing his concerns about the overall mediocrity of Romanian football. Despite his Bucharest affiliation, he continued to be fielded by Tricolor Constanța: in July 1925, they played against another Tricolor, of Călărași.

In 1925–1926, Protopopesco was chairman of Tricolor București, in which capacity he oversaw its merger with another local squad, Unirea, producing the consolidated Unirea Tricolor. During October 1927, he was again playing for Tricolor Constanța, and unable to prevent its 8–0 defeat by the new Victoria, in what had become a Dobrujan derby for the Brătoianu Cup. He had by then taken up semi-professional boxing, and was training at Popovici Hall. In December, while still registered at Unirea Tricolor, he made guest appearances in the Timiș-Torontal County league, at FC Politehnica Timișoara. By April 1928, he had signed an exclusive deal with Politehnica, appearing as its left-back.

In October 1928, Protopopesco moved to Cernăuți, signing for Dragoș Vodă. He made occasional trips to Constanța where, in August 1929, he was coach of the city squad. It was in Cernăuți that, in April 1932, he was admitted into the national squad selection committee of the Romanian Football Federation (FRF), as a corresponding member. In February 1934, he and other FRF officials received the Meritul Cultural medal, awarded to them by the Romanian king, Carol II; Protopopesco was granted its second-class version.

Protopopesco stayed in Cernăuți, where he worked as a schoolteacher after his retirement from football. In September 1934, he was a FRF observer at the Divizia A match between Jahn and Stadiul Bacăoan Bacău. A year later, Bucharest's Gazeta Sporturilor hosted his critique of football in Greater Romania. He argued therein that, having been torn apart by various internal influences and schools (especially including the style of play favored by Hungarians), Romanian football education had never managed to produce a style that "would fit our temperament."

== National-level organizer ==
By March 1937, Protopopesco had been included on the referee board of the Romanian Eastern League, revamped with the addition of an all-Cernăuți team. He and his colleagues were praised by Gazeta Sporturilor as an infusion of professionalism. He refereed both official league matches and international friendlies: in September, he was on call for the international match between Dragoș Vodă and the visiting Pogoń Lwów. By November, he had joined the Bukovina regional committee of the Romanian Boxing Federation, drafting plans for a Cernăuți school of boxing referees.

On 2 January 1938, Protopopesco was set to preside over a regional boxing competition. During March, he organized and judged the All-Romanian Amateur Boxing Championship, held at the Cernăuți Modern Circus. In his parallel career in football, he oversaw the national youth final, won by CFR București against Dovbuș Cernăuți. As observed by the Czernowitzer Allgemeine Zeitung, his refereeing there was subpar. In August, Protopopesco threatened to resign from the Eastern referee board, after a conflict with the FRF, but was persuaded by central officials to reconsider his move. On 22 October, he was voted in as chairman of the board. He and all of his colleagues stepped down on 1 April 1940, declaring that none of their proposals had been enacted by the FRF.

Weeks after this incident, Romania responded to a Soviet ultimatum and evacuated Cernăuți, which was annexed to the Ukrainian SSR. At the height of World War II, Protopopesco resurfaced in Bucharest, where, in May 1942, he refereed a Romanian Cup match between Carmen and FC Brăila. The lost areas of Bukovina had by then been retaken by Romania, which participated on the Eastern Front as a German ally; a Bukovina Governorate was established. Protopopesco revisited Cernăuți in October 1942, as part of a squad of Bucharest referees that played against their local colleagues, and with Governor Corneliu Calotescu as a supervisor.

On 15 November 1943, Protopopesco was elected to the five-man Central Commission of Referees (CCA). Around the time of the anti-fascist coup of August 1944, he was clerking at the Bucharest Black Sector revenue service. In November, as Sportul Studențesc's rugby team was celebrating its silver jubilee, he asked former players to contact him at his office, announcing that he was organizing a feast. In March 1945, he was serving as CCA chairman.

== Final decades ==
Protopopesco remained active as a football pundit in his post-retirement decades, most of which (1948–1989) were spent under a communist regime. By the late 1970s, he was living outside Cișmigiu Gardens, on Rosmarin Street, at either No 10 or No 11. On 9 April 1972, Sportul daily featured his anniversary article on the Bucharest–Belgrade match; it mentioned his hope that his example would inspire the Romanian squad. In November 1977, Protopopesco sent a letter to Scînteia newspaper, with which he commented on the overall decline of Romanian football. Therein, he advocated for expanding the youth program and for exposing juniors to the rigors of "modern football". During a 1978 debate about the national team's physical fitness, he criticized the FRF for its high expectations in that field, noting that star player Nicolae Dobrin was at risk of being left out. Writer Ion Băieșu published Protopopesco's musings on this topic, but ultimately sided with the FRF. In April 1982, as he was celebrating both his 82nd birthday and the 60th anniversary of his debut against Belgrade, he received in his home the sports journalist Mihai Ionescu. In the subsequent interview, he argued that, while football was more dynamic and technical than in 1922, it had lost its enthusiasm.

In advanced old age, Protopopesco witnessed the end of Romanian communism. He died on 22 February 1991 at the age of 90, being at the time the longest-living Romanian international (only surpassed in this respect by Rudolf Wetzer, who died later). Nicolae Secăreanu, who remained the only survivor of the 1922 Belgrade friendlies, noted in a June 1992 interview with Sportul Românesc that his colleague "has recently died, the poor fella". In August, Mihai Ionescu mistakenly thought that Protopopesco was still alive. In the same newspaper, he argued that his absence from scheduled player reunions was due to his being "non-transportable, at age 92".
