= Vâlcov (disambiguation) =

Vâlcov may refer to:

- Vâlcov, the Romanian name for Vylkove, Ukraine
- three brothers, all Romanian football players from Bolgrad:
  - Colea Vâlcov (1909-1970)
  - Petea Vâlcov (1910-1943)
  - Volodea Vâlcov (1916-1952)
