= Carol Burdan =

Romanian footballer

Personal information
- Date of birth: 1912
- Position: Goalkeeper

Senior career*
Years	Team	Apps	(Gls)
1932	Voința Arad		
1932–1933	Gloria CFR Arad	4	(0)
1933–1935	Venus București	26	(0)
1935–1936	Victoria Cluj	4	(0)
1936–1938	Venus București	15	(0)
Total		49	(0)

International career
1934	Romania	3	(0)

Managerial career
- 1948–1949: UTA Arad
- * Club domestic league appearances and goals

Carol Burdan (born 1912, date of death unknown) was a Romanian footballer who played as a goalkeeper.

== International career ==
Carol Burdan played three matches for Romania, making his debut on 14 October 1934 under coach Alexandru Săvulescu in friendly which ended 3–3 against Poland. His following two games were a 2–2 against Greece and a 3–2 victory against Bulgaria at the 1934–35 Balkan Cup.

== Honours ==
Venus București

- Divizia A: 1933–34, 1936–37
