= Andrei Bărbulescu =

Romanian footballer

Personal information
- Date of birth: 16 October 1909
- Place of birth: Slatina, Romania
- Date of death: 30 July 1987 (aged 77)
- Height: 1.76 m (5 ft 9 in)
- Position: Midfielder

Youth career
- 1924–1927: Venus București
- 1927–1930: Juventus București

Senior career*
Years	Team	Apps	(Gls)
1930–1932	Juventus București	25	(9)
1932–1940	Venus București	117	(8)
1940–1941	Sportul Studențesc București	20	(0)
1941–1945	Venus București (Note: The Divizia A 1940–41 was the last season before World War II and the Divizia A 1946–47 was the first one after, so the appearances and goals scored during this period for Venus București are not official with the exception of the 1945–46 regional championship.)	0	(0)
Total		162	(17)

International career
1935–1938	Romania	3	(0)
* Club domestic league appearances and goals as of 23 March 2024
Ice hockey career
- Position: Right wing
- Played for: Tenis Club Roman București; Telefon Club București; HC Bragadiru București; Venus București; Petrolul București; Știința Cluj
- National team: Romania
- Playing career: 1932–1952

Andrei Bărbulescu (16 October 1909 – 30 July 1987) was a Romanian football midfielder who played for Romania in the 1938 World Cup. He also played ice hockey, representing the national team in the 1947 Ice Hockey World Championships.

== Football career ==
=== Club career ===
Bărbulescu was born on 16 October 1909 in Slatina, Romania and began playing football at the junior squads of Venus București in 1924. In 1927, he joined Juventus București where he made his debut in senior football on 6 April 1930, as coach György Hlavay used him the entire match in a 2–2 draw against Maccabi București in the regional championship. Bărbulescu made one more appearance in the regional championship, as the team won it and qualified to the national championship. He played in the 4–2 win over Mihai Viteazul Chișinău in the semi-finals, but Hlavay did not use him in the 3–0 victory against Gloria Arad in the final, as the club won the first national title in its history. In the following regional championship, he scored his first official goal on 23 October 1930 in a 5–2 win over Sportul Studențesc București, finding the net eight times until the end of the season, including scoring two doubles in two victories against Turda București and Sportul Studențesc. In his last season at Juventus, he made 12 regional league appearances and scored one goal in a 3–3 draw against CFR București. Afterwards, Bărbulescu went back to play for Venus București, making his debut on 25 September 1932 in a Divizia A 2–0 home win over RGMT Timișoara. In the following season, Bărbulescu was used in 13 league games by coach Karoly Weszter, as the club won the title. He won another title in the 1936–37 season, this time under the guidance of coach Ferenc Plattkó who gave him 21 appearances in which he scored two goals. From 1939 to 1940, Bărbulescu helped the club win two consecutive league titles, both under coach Béla Jánosy. In the first he scored one goal in 15 appearances and in the second he played four games and scored three times. During his time with Venus, he also made four appearances in the Mitropa Cup over two editions, suffering first-round exits to Újpest and AGC Bologna. In 1940 he went to Sportul Studențesc București where he played his last Divizia A match on 18 May 1941 in a 2–1 home victory over Gloria CFR Galați. Afterwards, he made a comeback to Venus, ending his career in 1945.

=== International career ===
Bărbulescu played three games for Romania, making his debut on 25 August 1935 under coach Constantin Rădulescu in a friendly that ended in a 4–2 away loss to Germany. He was selected by coaches Alexandru Săvulescu and Rădulescu to be part of the squad that participated in the 1938 World Cup. He did not appear in the first game against Cuba, that ended in a 3–3 draw, but Bărbulescu played in the replay which ended in a surprising 2–1 loss.

== Ice hockey career ==
=== Club career ===
Bărbulescu started playing ice hockey as a right winger in 1932 at Tenis Club Roman București, alongside Constantin Cantacuzino, winning the Romanian Hockey League in his first season. Afterwards he went for one season at Telefon Club București. Then he moved to HC Bragadiru București where he reunited with Cantacuzino, also playing alongside Robert Sadowski, winning another Romanian Hockey League title. In 1938, Bărbulescu went to play for Venus București, spending seven years with them, winning a title in 1944. After a spell at Petrolul București, Andrei Bărbulescu ended his career in 1952 at Știința Cluj.

=== International career ===
Bărbulescu represented Romania's national team in the 1947 Ice Hockey World Championships where he made one appearance, as the team finished in 7th place.

== Death ==
Bărbulescu died on 30 July 1987 at age 77.

== Honours ==
=== Footballer ===
Juventus București

- Divizia A: 1929–30

Venus București

- Divizia A: 1933–34, 1936–37, 1938–39, 1939–40

=== Ice hockey player ===
Tenis Club Roman București

- Romanian Hockey League: 1933

HC Bragadiru București

- Romanian Hockey League: 1936

Venus București

- Romanian Hockey League: 1944
