= 1936–37 Divizia B =

Divizia B
- Season: 1936–37
- Promoted: Sportul Studențesc; Phoenix Baia Mare; CFR Brașov; Jiul Petroșani; Dacia Unirea IG Brăila; Vulturii Textila Lugoj; Dragoș Vodă Cernăuți; Olimpia CFR Satu Mare
- Relegated: None

The 1936–37 Divizia B was the third season of the second tier of the Romanian football league system.

The format was changed this year, from 5 series of 8 teams to 2 series of 13 teams. Also it was decided to expand Divizia A and first four teams of both series were promoted.

== Team changes ==
=== To Divizia B ===
Promoted

- —

Relegated from Divizia A

- —

=== From Divizia B ===
Relegated to Divizia C

- CA Cluj
- Societatea Gimnastică Sibiu
- Prahova Ploiești
- Tricolor Baia Mare
- CA Timișoara
- Patria Diciosânmartin
- CFR Oradea
- Elpis Constanța
- UD Reșița
- CFR Cluj
- Brașovia Brașov
- Stadiul Bacăoan Bacău
- Societatea Sportivă Sibiu

Promoted to Divizia A

- —

== League standings ==
=== Seria Est ===
Pos	Team	Pld	W	D	L	GF	GA	GD	Pts
1	Sportul Studențesc	24	16	4	4	60	26	+34	36
2	CFR Brașov	24	17	0	7	60	34	+26	34
3	Dacia Unirea IG Brăila	24	13	8	3	46	24	+22	34
4	Dragoș Vodă Cernăuți	24	14	3	7	61	45	+16	31
5	Victoria Constanța	24	13	4	7	58	43	+15	30
6	Maccabi București	24	11	3	10	66	49	+17	25
7	Franco-Româna Brăila	24	9	7	8	53	49	+4	25
8	IAR Brașov	24	8	5	11	65	53	+12	21
9	Tricolor Ploiești	24	6	7	11	48	58	−10	19
10	Dacia Vasile Alecsandri Galați	24	7	4	13	50	70	−20	18
11	Textila Moldova Iași	24	8	1	15	37	57	−20	17
12	Sporting Chișinău	24	4	4	16	33	69	−36	12
13	Jahn Cernăuți	24	4	2	18	22	82	−60	10

=== Seria Vest ===
Pos	Team	Pld	W	D	L	GF	GA	GD	Pts
1	Phoenix Baia Mare	24	16	4	4	75	24	+51	36
2	Jiul Petroșani	24	15	2	7	64	35	+29	32
3	Vulturii Textila Lugoj	24	13	6	5	55	36	+19	32
4	Olimpia CFR Satu Mare	24	14	2	8	60	35	+25	30
5	Mureșul Târgu Mureș	24	14	2	8	53	40	+13	30
6	CAM Timișoara	24	13	3	8	64	41	+23	29
7	Craiovan Craiova	24	11	4	9	52	62	−10	26
8	Rovine Grivița Craiova	24	12	1	11	50	42	+8	25
9	Șoimii Sibiu	24	8	4	12	35	55	−20	20
10	Unirea MV Alba Iulia	24	6	5	13	39	65	−26	17
11	Stăruința Oradea	24	6	4	14	30	49	−19	16
12	CFR Simeria	24	7	1	16	34	66	−32	15
13	Victoria Carei	24	1	2	21	14	75	−61	4

== See also ==
- 1936–37 Divizia A
- 1936–37 Divizia C
