= 1933–34 Divizia A =

22nd season of top-tier football league in Romania

Divizia A
- Season: 1933–34
- Champions: Venus București
- Matches: 112
- Goals: 471 (4.21 per match)
- Top goalscorer: Ștefan Dobay (20)
- Biggest home win: Unirea Tricolor 10–1 Mureșul
- Biggest away win: Mureșul 0–6 Ripensia
- Highest scoring: Unirea Tricolor 10–1 Mureșul

The 1933–34 Divizia A was the twenty-second season of Divizia A, the top-level football league of Romania.

== Group 1 ==
=== League table ===
Pos	Team	Pld	W	D	L	GF	GA	GD	Pts	Qualification or relegation
1	Venus București (C)	14	9	1	4	41	23	+18	19	Advances to final
2	Crișana Oradea	14	7	4	3	29	19	+10	18	
3	Universitatea Cluj	14	8	1	5	33	17	+16	17	
4	CFR București	14	7	3	4	29	18	+11	17	
5	AMEF Arad	14	7	3	4	26	22	+4	17	
6	Chinezul Timișoara	14	8	0	6	33	25	+8	16	
7	Brașovia Brașov (R)	14	1	2	11	18	54	−36	4	Relegation to Divizia B
8	Tricolor Ploiești (R)	14	1	2	11	14	45	−31	4	Relegation to Divizia B

Source: LT
Rules for classification: 1) points; 2) goal difference; 3) number of goals scored
(C) Champions; (R) Relegated

=== Results ===
Home \ Away	AME	BRA	CFR	CHI	CRI	TRI	UCJ	VEN
AMEF Arad	—	2–1	0–0	3–2	3–1	6–2	4–1	3–1
Brașovia Brașov	3–3	—	1–2	1–3	2–2	6–0	0–3	2–7
CFR București	1–0	7–0	—	3–2	1–1	5–2	1–0	3–4
Chinezul Timișoara	7–1	2–1	2–0	—	5–0	4–1	0–2	3–0
Crișana Oradea	1–0	6–0	1–1	8–1	—	4–1	1–0	0–3
Tricolor Ploiești	0–0	4–1	0–2	1–2	0–1	—	1–4	2–2
Universitatea Cluj	0–1	7–0	2–1	3–0	2–2	2–0	—	0–3
Venus București	2–0	6–0	3–2	1–0	0–1	6–0	3–7	—

Source: LT
Legend: Blue = home team win; Yellow = draw; Red = away team win.
For upcoming matches, an "a" indicates there is an article about the rivalry between the two participants.

== Group 2 ==
=== League table ===
Pos	Team	Pld	W	D	L	GF	GA	GD	Pts	Qualification or relegation
1	Ripensia Timișoara (A)	14	10	2	2	55	13	+42	22	Advances to final
2	Unirea Tricolor București	14	9	2	3	40	19	+21	20	
3	CA Oradea	14	8	2	4	44	19	+25	18	
4	Juventus București	14	8	2	4	26	21	+5	18	
5	România Cluj	14	7	2	5	24	21	+3	16	
6	Gloria CFR Arad	14	5	2	7	29	38	−9	12	
7	Mureșul Târgu Mureș (R)	14	1	2	11	15	53	−38	4	Relegation to Divizia B
8	Șoimii Sibiu (R)	14	0	2	12	7	56	−49	2	Relegation to Divizia B

Source: LT
Rules for classification: 1) points; 2) goal difference; 3) number of goals scored
(A) Advance to a further round; (R) Relegated

=== Results ===
Home \ Away	CAO	GLA	JUV	MUR	RIP	ROM	UTB	ŞOI
CA Oradea	—	4–1	1–2	4–0	0–0	5–1	1–1	7–0
Gloria CFR Arad	1–6	—	2–2	3–0	1–3	0–2	2–2	8–1
Juventus București	4–2	1–0	—	3–1	1–2	1–2	2–0	3–1
Mureșul Târgu Mureș	3–4	2–3	3–4	—	0–6	0–1	0–4	1–1
Ripensia Timișoara	3–0	8–0	1–3	7–2	—	4–4	6–2	7–0
România Cluj	1–4	2–3	3–0	5–0	3–0	—	1–2	2–0
Unirea Tricolor București	2–1	3–2	4–0	10–1	0–3	2–0	—	3–0
Șoimii Sibiu	0–5	2–3	1–3	1–4	0–5	0–0	0–5	—

Source: LT
Legend: Blue = home team win; Yellow = draw; Red = away team win.
For upcoming matches, an "a" indicates there is an article about the rivalry between the two participants.

== Final ==
Team 1	Agg.	Team 2	1st leg	2nd leg
Ripensia Timișoara	5–8	Venus București	2–3	3–5

== Top goalscorers ==
Rank	Player	Club	Goals
1	Ștefan Dobay	Ripensia Timișoara	25
2	Volodea Vâlcov	Venus București	15
3	Grațian Sepi	Universitatea Cluj	14
4	Iuliu Bodola	CA Oradea	13
4	Petea Vâlcov	Venus București	13

== Champion squad ==
Venus București

Goalkeepers: Ion Lăpușneanu (7 / 0); Ștefan Bărbulescu (3 / 0); Carol Burdan (6 / 0).
Defenders: Constantin Stanciu (15 / 0); Gheorghe Albu (9 / 3); Atanase Tănăsescu (3 / 0); Milos Struska (7 / 0).
Midfielders: Andrei Bărbulescu (13 / 0); Costel Actis (14 / 2); Alfred Eisenbeisser (15 / 1); Costel Constantinescu (6 / 0).
Forwards: Emanoil Dumitrescu (14 / 3); Volodea Vâlcov (16 / 15); Colea Vâlcov (16 / 6); Petea Vâlcov (16 / 13); Ștefan Motoroiu (13 / 6); Sterian (3 / 0).
(league appearances and goals listed in brackets)

Manager: Karoly Weszter (Hungary) .
