= 1936–37 Divizia A =

25th season of top-tier football league in Romania

Divizia A
- Season: 1936–37
- Champions: Venus București
- Top goalscorer: Ștefan Dobay; Traian Iordache (21)

The 1936–37 Divizia A was the twenty-fifth season of Divizia A, the top-level football league of Romania.

== Teams ==
Location of teams in 1936-37 Divizia A

== League table ==
| Pos | Team | Pld | W | D | L | GF | GA | GD | Pts | Qualification |
|---|---|---|---|---|---|---|---|---|---|---|
| 1 | Venus București (C) | 22 | 13 | 6 | 3 | 63 | 26 | +37 | 32 | Champions of Romania |
| 2 | Rapid București | 22 | 13 | 4 | 5 | 58 | 27 | +31 | 30 | |
| 3 | Ripensia Timișoara | 22 | 13 | 1 | 8 | 59 | 39 | +20 | 27 | |
| 4 | AMEF Arad | 22 | 10 | 7 | 5 | 46 | 27 | +19 | 27 | |
| 5 | Victoria Cluj | 22 | 12 | 1 | 9 | 55 | 47 | +8 | 25 | |
| 6 | CA Oradea | 22 | 8 | 4 | 10 | 39 | 45 | −6 | 20 | |
| 7 | Juventus București | 22 | 8 | 4 | 10 | 41 | 51 | −10 | 20 | |
| 8 | Gloria Arad | 22 | 8 | 2 | 12 | 42 | 52 | −10 | 18 | |
| 9 | Universitatea Cluj | 22 | 8 | 2 | 12 | 38 | 62 | −24 | 18 | |
| 10 | Chinezul Timișoara | 22 | 6 | 4 | 12 | 40 | 55 | −15 | 16 | |
| 11 | Crișana Oradea | 22 | 5 | 5 | 12 | 35 | 53 | −18 | 15 | |
| 12 | Unirea Tricolor București | 22 | 6 | 2 | 14 | 49 | 81 | −32 | 14 | |

Source: LT
Rules for classification: 1) points; 2) goal difference; 3) number of goals scored
(C) Champions

=== Note ===
No team was relegated because 1937–38 Divizia A was expanded to 20 Teams (2 Groups of 10).

=== Results ===
| Home \ Away | AME | CAO | CHI | CRI | GLA | JUV | RAP | RIP | UTB | UCJ | VEN | VCL |
|---|---|---|---|---|---|---|---|---|---|---|---|---|
| AMEF Arad | — | 5–0 | 2–1 | 3–2 | 3–1 | 0–0 | 2–0 | 3–1 | 4–0 | 3–0 | 1–1 | 2–2 |
| CA Oradea | 2–1 | — | 3–2 | 5–2 | 3–0 | 1–1 | 0–1 | 1–2 | 4–2 | 3–1 | 2–2 | 2–4 |
| Chinezul Timișoara | 3–1 | 0–0 | — | 3–0 (Note: The match between Chinezul Timișoara and Crișana Oradea was approved with the victory of the hosts, because the guests did not show up.) | 2–2 | 1–3 | 3–2 | 3–5 | 5–3 | 6–1 | 1–3 | 4–1 |
| Crișana Oradea | 1–1 | 0–1 | 2–2 | — | 1–1 | 3–3 | 3–2 | 1–0 | 4–2 | 3–1 | 1–1 | 5–1 |
| Gloria Arad | 2–0 | 5–1 | 4–2 (Note: The match between Gloria Arad and Chinezul Timișoara (on the field 4–2) was approved as lost by both teams, because neither had paid their fees for 1937.) | 8–2 | — | 0–3 | 0–5 | 4–0 | 3–2 | 5–1 | 1–5 | 1–3 |
| Juventus București | 2–1 | 0–3 | 5–2 | 2–1 | 1–2 | — | 1–4 | 2–1 | 4–1 | 2–3 | 2–1 | 2–3 |
| Rapid București | 2–2 | 3–2 | 2–2 | 4–1 | 3–0 | 4–2 | — | 5–2 | 5–0 | 5–0 | 1–1 | 2–1 |
| Ripensia Timișoara | 1–4 | 3–1 | 3–1 | 2–0 | 6–1 | 6–2 | 1–0 | — | 5–0 | 4–0 | 1–1 | 6–2 |
| Unirea Tricolor București | 2–2 | 3–1 | 8–1 | 2–0 | 5–3 | 3–3 | 0–5 | 3–2 | — | 8–0 | 2–4 | 1–6 |
| Universitatea Cluj | 1–0 | 3–3 | 6–1 | 1–0 | 1–2 | 2–1 | 1–1 | 2–1 | 7–2 | — | 2–1 | 1–2 |
| Venus București | 1–1 | 3–1 | 2–0 | 6–2 | 4–1 | 6–0 | 2–0 | 0–2 | 6–0 | 6–3 | — | 4–1 |
| Victoria Cluj | 2–5 | 2–0 | 1–0 | 5–1 | 1–0 | 3–0 | 1–2 | 3–5 | 7–0 | 3–1 | 1–3 | — |

Source: LT
Legend: Blue = home team win; Yellow = draw; Red = away team win.

== Top goalscorers ==
| Rank | Player | Club | Goals |
|---|---|---|---|
| 1 | Ștefan Dobay | Ripensia Timişoara | 21 |
| 1 | Traian Iordache | Unirea Tricolor București | 21 |
| 3 | Kostas Choumis | Venus București | 18 |
| 4 | Petea Vâlcov | Venus București | 16 |
| 5 | Teodor Felecan | Victoria Cluj | 15 |

== Champion squad ==
Venus București

Goalkeepers: Nicolae Iordăchescu (8 / 0); Carol Burdan (14 / 0).
Defenders: Lazăr Sfera (22 / 1); Gheorghe Albu (22 / 0).
Midfielders: Andrei Bărbulescu (21 / 2); Alfred Eisenbeisser (8 / 0); Nicolae Gorgorin (22 / 0); Colea Vâlcov (18 / 2); Victor Mihăilescu (1 / 0); Theodor Beffa (Greece) (2 / 0).
Forwards: Lucian Gruin (22 / 10); Grațian Sepi (6 / 1); Kostas Choumis (20 / 18); Petea Vâlcov (22 / 16); Nicolae Ene (14 / 7); Dan Gavrilescu (16 / 4); Ștefan Niculescu (16 / 4).
(league appearances and goals listed in brackets)

Manager: Ferenc Plattkó (Hungary) .

== See also ==
- Liga II#List of champions and promoted teams
- 1936–37 Divizia B
- 1936–37 Divizia C
