= Mureșul Târgu Mureș =

Defunct Romanian football club

- Full name: Clubul Sportiv Mureșul Târgu Mureș
- Short name: Mureșul
- Founded: 1921 and 1959
- Dissolved: 1940 and 1964
- Ground: Târgu Mureș, Romania
Home colours	Away colours

Clubul Sportiv Mureșul Târgu Mureș, commonly known as Mureșul Târgu Mureș, was a Romanian football club based in Târgu Mureș, Mureș County. Founded in 1921 as SS Mureșul Târgu Mureș, the club became one of the city's leading teams during the interwar period and twice reached the semi-finals of the Romanian national championship, in 1923–24 and 1931–32.

The original Mureșul ceased activity in 1940, following the territorial changes caused by the Second Vienna Award. A separate club, CS Târgu Mureș, was founded in 1944 and became the city's principal post-war team. In 1960, after CS Târgu Mureș disappeared from the national leagues, its structure was combined with Voința Târgu Mureș in a new Mureșul project. In September 1964, Mureșul merged into ASA Târgu Mureș, a separate military club founded in 1962, bringing the Mureșul name to an end.

== History ==
=== Foundation and early regional football (1921–1923) ===
Mureșul Târgu Mureș was founded in 1921 under the name SS Mureșul Târgu Mureș. The name referred to the Mureș River, which flows through the city.

In 1923, the club joined forces with the local railway workers' team CFR Târgu Mureș and adopted the name CFR Mureșul Târgu Mureș. The merger strengthened the squad and allowed Mureșul to become one of the leading teams in the Târgu Mureș regional championship.

The club won the regional title in the 1923–24 season and qualified for the national championship tournament. Mureșul defeated Șoimii Sibiu and then Venus București to reach the semi-finals, where it was eliminated after a 0–9 defeat against Chinezul Timișoara.

=== CS Mureșul and the interwar peak (1924–1932) ===
In 1924, the railway association ended and the club became independent again under the name CS Mureșul Târgu Mureș.

Mureșul remained one of the strongest sides in central Transylvania during the second half of the 1920s, competing in the regional championship for qualification to the national finals.

The club returned to the national championship in 1931–32. Mureșul won the Mureș regional championship and subsequently entered the final tournament of the Central League. It defeated Industria Aeronautică Română Brașov 5–0 before winning the Central League final 3–1 against Șoimii Sibiu.

At national level, Mureșul defeated Crișana Oradea 2–0 in the opening round. In the semi-final, however, the team was heavily defeated 2–8 by defending champions UD Reșița.

The two semi-final appearances of 1924 and 1932 remained the club's best performances in the Romanian championship.

=== Divizia A and relegation (1932–1934) ===
When the Romanian championship was reorganised into a permanent national league in 1932, Mureșul was initially selected for the inaugural 1932–33 Divizia A season. However, the club failed to confirm its participation and withdrew before the championship began.

Mureșul entered the top division the following season. In 1933–34, the club competed in Series II and finished 7th out of eight teams, with one victory, two draws and eleven defeats. The result led to relegation to Divizia B.

=== Divizia B and final pre-war years (1934–1940) ===
After relegation, Mureșul became a regular second-division side.

In 1934–35, the club finished 3rd in Series IV, behind Societatea Gimnastică Sibiu and CFR Simeria.

The club remained competitive during the following seasons and by 1937–38 had emerged as a serious promotion contender, finishing 3rd in Series II behind UD Reșița and CAM Timișoara.

Mureșul produced its strongest Divizia B campaign in 1938–39, winning the North Group of the Western Series with 29 points from 18 matches, seven points ahead of Industria Sârmei Câmpia Turzii.

The group victory sent Mureșul into the promotion play-off. The club defeated CAM Timișoara 1–0 at home after losing 1–4 away and also defeated Gloria CFR Galați 2–0 at home after a 1–4 away defeat. These results were not sufficient to earn promotion to Divizia A.

In 1939–40, Mureșul again challenged near the top of the table and finished 2nd in Series I with 26 points, level with FC Craiova and FC Brăila but two points behind FC Ploiești.

The club disappeared from Romanian competition later in 1940 after Northern Transylvania, including Târgu Mureș, was transferred to Hungary under the Second Vienna Award.

=== Post-war football and the separate CS Târgu Mureș (1944–1960) ===
Mureșul itself did not resume activity immediately after the war.

In 1944, railway workers in Târgu Mureș established a separate organisation called ASM Târgu Mureș, bringing together many of the city's leading players. This club later competed under the names Dermagant, RATA, Locomotiva, Avîntul, Recolta, Energia Recolta and finally CS Târgu Mureș.

CS Târgu Mureș was therefore not simply a renamed continuation of the pre-war Mureșul. It was a distinct post-war club founded in 1944, which went on to spend ten seasons in Divizia A and achieved two 4th-place finishes before disappearing from the national leagues in 1960.

=== Revival and merger with ASA (1960–1964) ===
In 1960, the Mureșul name returned to competitive football. Historical sources describe the new CS Mureșul Târgu Mureș as emerging from Voința Târgu Mureș, with the remaining structure of the recently dissolved CS Târgu Mureș also becoming associated with the project.

The revived Mureșul competed in Divizia B for four seasons.

Meanwhile, a completely separate military club, AS Armata Târgu Mureș, had been established in 1962.

In September 1964, Mureșul merged with ASA. The merger strengthened the army-backed club and gave ASA a place in Divizia B, while the Mureșul organisation ceased to exist.

ASA subsequently became the dominant football club in Târgu Mureș and later reached the Romanian top flight, but it should not be regarded as the same legal or historical entity as the original Mureșul founded in 1921.

== Relationship with other Târgu Mureș clubs ==
The history of football in Târgu Mureș includes several clubs whose identities are sometimes conflated.

Mureșul Târgu Mureș originated in 1921 and had its principal interwar period between 1921 and 1940. Its name was revived in 1960, and that project existed until its merger with ASA in 1964.

CS Târgu Mureș was a separate club founded in 1944 as ASM Târgu Mureș. It competed under several names after the war and spent ten seasons in Divizia A before disappearing in 1960. Although part of its sporting structure became associated with the revived Mureșul project, CS Târgu Mureș was not the same club as the pre-war Mureșul.

ASA Târgu Mureș was founded independently in 1962 as a military sports club. It merged with Mureșul in September 1964 and thereafter became the city's principal football team. The merger does not mean that ASA should be treated as a direct continuation of the 1921 Mureșul club.

== Chronology of names ==
Name	Period
SS Mureșul Târgu Mureș	1921–1923
CFR Mureșul Târgu Mureș	1923–1924
CS Mureșul Târgu Mureș	1924–1940
Inactive / dissolved
Voința Târgu Mureș	1959–1960
CS Mureșul Târgu Mureș	1960–1964

== Honours ==
Romanian Championship

- Semi-finals (2): 1923–24, 1931–32
- Best league-format finish: 7th in Series II, 1933–34

Divizia B

- Series winners (1): 1938–39
- Runners-up (1): 1939–40

Central League

- Winners (1): 1931–32

== Notable former players ==
- (Romania) Gheorghe Barcu
- (Romania) Simion Deutsch
- (Romania) Csaba Györffy
- (Romania) Emil Koch
- (Romania) Attila Molnár
- (Romania) Radu Niculescu
- (Romania) Adalbert Nuridschany
- (Romania) Gheorghe Ola
- (Romania) Cornel Orza

== Former managers ==
- (Romania) Gheorghe Váczi (1940–1941)

== League history ==
Season	Tier	Division	Place	Notes
1963–64	2	Divizia B (Series II)	7th	Merged into ASA Târgu Mureș after the season
1962–63	2	Divizia B (Series III)	9th	
1961–62	2	Divizia B (Series III)	3rd	
1960–61	2	Divizia B (Series III)	7th	Voința merged with CS Târgu Mureș and was renamed Mureșul
1959–60	3	Regional Championship (Mureș)	1st (C, P)	Promoted
1940–59	Not active			
1939–40	2	Divizia B (Series I)	2nd	
1938–39	2	Divizia B (North–West Series)	1st (C)	Lost promotion play-off
1937–38	2	Divizia B (Series II)	3rd	
1936–37	2	Divizia B (Series Vest)	5th	
1935–36	2	Divizia B (Series IV)	5th	
1934–35	2	Divizia B (Series IV)	3rd	
1933–34	1	Divizia A (Series II)	7th (R)	Relegated
1932–33	2	Central League	1st (C, P)	Promoted to Divizia A
1931–32	1	Divizia A	3rd	Central League winners; semi-finals
1924–31	Competed in regional championships			
1923–24	1	Divizia A	3rd	Târgu Mureș district champions; semi-finals
1921–23	Competed in the Târgu Mureș district championship			

== Bibliography ==
- Istoria fotbalului românesc, vol. I, 1909–1944.
- Hardy Grüne (2000), Enzyklopädie der europäischen Fußballvereine (in German) (1st ed.), Kassel: AGON Sportverlag, ISBN 3-89784-163-0
