= Simion Deutsch =

Romanian footballer

Personal information
- Full name: Simion Samuel Deutsch
- Date of birth: 1898
- Date of death: 12 March 1972 (aged 73–74)
- Position: Striker

Senior career*
Years	Team	Apps	(Gls)
1922–1923	Mureșul Târgu Mureș		
1924–1925	Universitatea Cluj	19	(5)
1926	Juventus București	2	(0)

International career
1923	Romania	1	(0)
- * Club domestic league appearances and goals

Simion Samuel Deutsch (1898 – 12 March 1972) was a Romanian footballer who played as a striker.

== International career ==
Simion Deutsch played one friendly match for Romania, on 26 October 1923 under coach Constantin Rădulescu in a 2–2 against Turkey.
