= Constantin Stanciu =

Romanian footballer

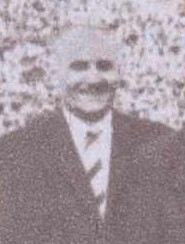
- Stanciu in 1966

Personal information
- Date of birth: 24 September 1907
- Place of birth: Bucharest, Romania
- Date of death: 27 March 1986 (aged 78)
- Place of death: Bucharest, Romania
- Height: 1.88 m (6 ft 2 in)
- Position: Centre-forward

Senior career*
Years	Team	Apps	(Gls)
1923–1926	Venus București		
1926–1927	Fulgerul Chișinău	22	(2)
1927–1935	Venus București	62	(6)
1935–1939	Juventus București	23	(2)
1939–1940	Metalosport București		
1940–1941	FC Brăila	7	(0)
Total		114	(10)

International career
1929–1931	Romania	8	(4)

Managerial career
- 1954: Farul Constanța
- * Club domestic league appearances and goals

Constantin Stanciu (24 September 1907 – 27 March 1986) was a Romanian football forward.

== Club career ==
Stanciu was born on 24 September 1907 in Bucharest, Romania. He began playing football in 1923 at Venus București. In 1926, he moved to play for Fulgerul Chișinău.

One year later he returned to Venus with whom he managed to win the championship in the 1928–29 season, contributing with three goals in 12 games. He won his second title in the 1931–32 season, playing in 13 matches in which he scored one goal. In the 1933–34 season, Stanciu helped Venus win another title, coach Karoly Weszter using him in 15 games.

In 1935 he joined Juventus București where in his first two seasons he made 23 appearances with two goals scored. In 1939 he went to play for Metalosport București. Stanciu ended his career by playing seven matches for FC Brăila during the 1940–41 Divizia A season.

== International career ==
Stanciu played eight games and scored four goals for Romania, making his debut on 15 September 1929 when coach Constantin Rădulescu sent him in the 65th minute to replace Nicolae Kovács in a friendly which ended with a 3–2 away victory against Bulgaria. He played three games in the 1929–31 Balkan Cup, scoring a double in a 5–2 win over Bulgaria as Romania won the competition.

Stanciu was selected by coach Rădulescu to be part of Romania's squad for the 1930 World Cup. There, he played in the first group stage game, a 3–1 victory against Peru in which he was heavily tackled in the first half by Luis de Souza and Alberto Denegri. He was limping in the second half of the game, because no substitutions were allowed, managing to score the 2–1 goal with his injured leg. He did not play in the second game which was a 4–0 loss to hosts and eventual world champions Uruguay.

Stanciu played his last two games for the national team in the victorious 1931–1934 Central European Cup for Amateurs, scoring a goal in a 4–1 victory against Czechoslovakia.

=== International goals ===
Scores and results list Romania's goal tally first. "Score" column indicates the score after the player's goal.

#	Date	Venue	Opponent	Score	Result	Competition
1.	14 July 1930	Estadio Pocitos, Montevideo, Uruguay	Peru	2–1	3–1	1930 FIFA World Cup
2.	10 May 1931	Stadionul ONEF, Bucharest, Romania	Bulgaria	4–1	5–2	1929–31 Balkan Cup
3.	10 May 1931	Stadionul ONEF, Bucharest, Romania	Bulgaria	5–1	5–2	1929–31 Balkan Cup
4.	20 September 1931	Stadionul Carol al-II-lea, Oradea, Romania	Czechoslovakia	1–0	4–1	1931–1934 Central European Cup for Amateurs

== Death ==
Stanciu died on 27 March 1986 at age 78.

== Honours ==
Venus București

- Divizia A: 1928–29, 1931–32, 1933–34

Romania

- Balkan Cup: 1929–31
- Central European International Cup: 1931–34
