= Emanoil Dumitrescu =

Romanian footballer

Personal information
- Full name: Emanoil Manole Dumitrescu
- Date of birth: 1 June 1907
- Place of birth: Târgu Neamț, Romania
- Date of death: 1 August 1988 (aged 81)
- Position: Striker

Senior career*
Years	Team	Apps	(Gls)
1926–1936	Venus București	66	(19)

International career
1929–1930	Romania	3	(0)
- * Club domestic league appearances and goals

Emanoil Manole Dumitrescu (1 June 1907 – 1 August 1988) was a Romanian football striker.

== International career ==
Emanoil Dumitrescu played three games at international level for Romania, making his debut in a friendly which ended with a 3–2 victory against Bulgaria. He also played one game at the successful 1929–31 Balkan Cup in a 2–1 home victory against Yugoslavia. Emanoil Dumitrescu's last game for the national team was a friendly which ended with a 2–1 loss against Yugoslavia.

== Honours ==
Venus Bucureşti

- Divizia A: 1928–29, 1931–32, 1933–34

Romania

- Balkan Cup: 1929–31
