= Radu Niculescu (footballer, born 1909) =

Romanian footballer (1909–?)

Personal information
- Date of birth: 11 November 1909
- Position: Midfielder

Senior career*
Years	Team	Apps	(Gls)
1924	Mureșul Târgu Mureș		
1931–1932	Olympia București		

International career
1931	Romania	1	(0)
- * Club domestic league appearances and goals

Radu Niculescu (born 11 November 1909, date of death unknown) was a Romanian footballer who played as a midfielder.

== International career ==
Radu Niculescu played one match for Romania, on 10 May 1931 under coach Constantin Rădulescu in a 5–2 victory against Bulgaria at the 1929–31 Balkan Cup. He was also part of Romania's 1924 Summer Olympics squad, though he did not play in Romania's only match during the tournament—a 6–0 second-round loss to the Netherlands on May 27, 1924.
