= Adalbert Nuridschany =

Romanian footballer

Personal information
- Date of birth: 6 September 1894
- Place of birth: Marosvásárhely, Austria-Hungary
- Date of death: Unknown
- Position: Striker

Senior career*
Years	Team	Apps	(Gls)
1922–1924	Mureșul Târgu Mureș		

International career
1923	Romania	1	(0)
- * Club domestic league appearances and goals

Adalbert Nuridschany (born 6 September 1894, date of death unknown) was a Romanian footballer who played as a striker.

== International career ==
Adalbert Nuridschany played one friendly match for Romania, on 26 October 1923 under coach Constantin Rădulescu in a 2–2 against Turkey.
