= Nanov =

Commune in Teleorman, Romania, Nanov

- Commune
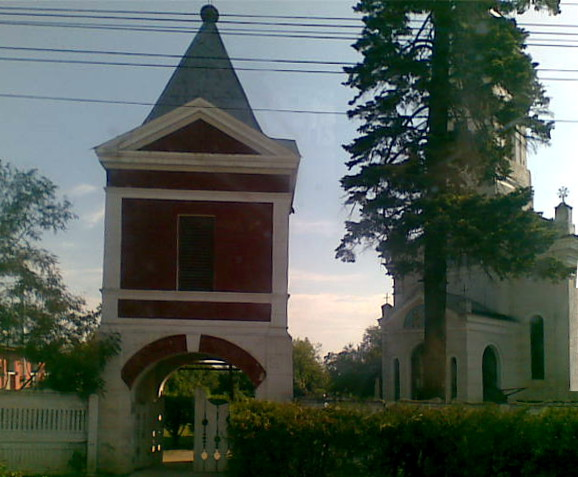
- Church in Nanov

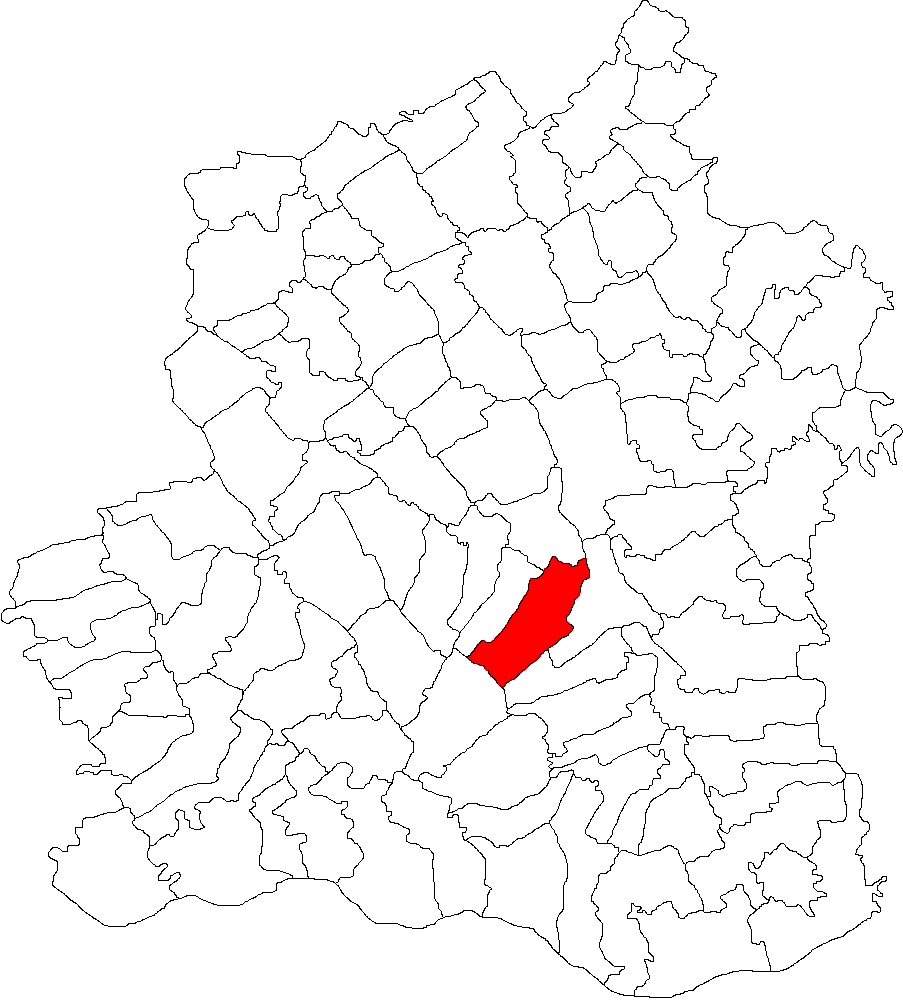
- Location in Teleorman County

- Location in Romania
- Coordinates: 44°00′N 25°18′E
- Country: Romania
- County: Teleorman

Government
  - Mayor (2020–2024): Adrian Ghene (PNL)
- Elevation: 47 m (154 ft)
- Population (2021-12-01): 3,585
- Time zone: UTC+02:00 (EET)
  - Summer (DST): UTC+03:00 (EEST)
- Postal code: 147215
- Area code: +40 247
- Vehicle reg.: TR
- Website: www.primaria-nanov.ro

Nanov is a commune in Teleorman County, Muntenia, Romania. It is composed of a single village, Nanov.

The commune is situated in the middle of the Wallachian Plain, on the banks of the Nanov River. It is crossed by the 44th parallel north.

== Natives ==
- Nicolae Secăreanu (1901 – 1992), opera singer and actor
