= Emil Koch =

Romanian footballer

Personal information
- Date of birth: 7 June 1897
- Date of death: 1 June 1978 (aged 80)
- Position: Defender

Senior career*
Years	Team	Apps	(Gls)
1921–1923	Mureșul Târgu Mureș		

International career
1922	Romania	1	(0)
- * Club domestic league appearances and goals

Emil Koch (7 June 1897 – 1 June 1978) was a Romanian football defender. Emil Koch played one friendly game for Romania, which ended 1–1 against Poland.
