= 1931–32 Divizia A =

20th season of top-tier football league in Romania

Divizia A
- Season: 1931–32
- Champions: Venus București

The 1931–32 Divizia A was the twentieth season of Divizia A, the top tier of Romanian football. It was the final season contested under a regional, cup-style format, before the introduction of a nationwide league system in the 1932–33 season.

== Participating teams ==
Region	Team
East	Maccabi Cernăuți
North	Crișana Oradea
South	Venus București
Center	Mureșul Târgu Mureș
West	UD Reșița

== Final Tournament of Regions ==
=== Preliminary round ===
Team 1	Score	Team 2
Mureșul Târgu Mureș (Romania)	2–0	(Romania) Crișana Oradea

=== Semifinals ===
Team 1	Score	Team 2
Venus București (Romania)	5–0	(Romania) Maccabi Cernăuți
UD Reșița (Romania)	8–2	(Romania) Mureșul Târgu Mureș

=== Final ===
July 10, 1932, Bucharest

Team 1	Score	Team 2
Venus București (Romania)	3–0 (1–0)	(Romania) UD Reșița

== Champion squad ==
Venus București

Goalkeepers: Octav Stoian (2 / 0); Traian Belitoreanu (5 / 0), Ion Lăpușneanu (11 / 0).
Defenders: Murea (15 / 0); G.Tănăsescu II (15 / 0); Milos Struska (11 / 2).
Midfielders: Atanase Tănăsescu (1 / 0); Nicolae Pantazi (1 / 0); Constantin Stanciu (13 / 1); Costel Actis (18 / 1); Mircea Nicolaescu (2 / 0); Gheorghiade (4 / 0); Costel Constantinescu (11 / 0).
Forwards: Emanoil Dumitrescu (14 / 5); D.Vasilescu (6 / 0); Colea Vâlcov (18 / 9); Petea Vâlcov (18 / 24); Volodea Vâlcov (16 / 6); Ștefan Motoroiu (13 / 7); Vasilocov (3 / 1); Georgescu (1 / 0).
(league appearances and goals listed in brackets)
