= Kingdom in the Clouds =

- Directed by: Elisabeta Bostan
- Written by: Elisabeta Bostan
- Story by: Petre Ispirescu
- Starring: Mircea Breazu; Carmen Stănescu; Emanoil Petruț; Nicolae Secăreanu
- Cinematography: Julius Druckmann
- Edited by: Dan Naum
- Music by: Temistocle Popa
- Production companies: Studioul Cinematografic București; Mosfilm
- Distributed by: RomaniaFilm; Xerox Films (U.S., 1971); Paramount Pictures (U.S., 1974)
- Release date: 4 August 1969
- Running time: 83 minutes
- Countries: Romania; Soviet Union
- Language: Romanian
- Budget: 6,144,383 lei

Kingdom in the Clouds (Romanian: Tinerețe fără bătrînețe – literal title: Youth Without Old Age) is a Romanian fantasy film from 1969. It was directed and written by Elisabeta Bostan from a story by Petre Ispirescu (Tinerețe fără bătrânețe și viață fără de moarte).

== Plot ==
A young man's quest for a kingdom promising eternal youth and immortality. To reach his goal he must fulfill the three wishes of the Emperor's daughter, retrieve three golden objects, answer three riddles set by the Lord of Time, overcome an evil witch, and escape the Kingdom of Lies ruled by an evil Emperor and the young man's nemesis, the Prince of Lies. In return for good deeds along the way, he is given a magical horn and feather to aid him in his quest and is served by a flying horse, all this before he can finally enter the Kingdom of Youth without Old Age and Life without Death and marry the Emperor's daughter.

== Cast ==
- Carmen Stănescu as Împărăteasa Tinereții
- Emanoil Petruț as Împăratul/Moș Vreme (Lord of Time)
- Anna Széles (as Ana Széles) as Zâna
- Mircea Breazu as Făt-Frumos
- Nicolae Secăreanu as Împăratul Minciună
- Ioan Tugearu as son of Împăratului Minciună
- Mihai Pălădescu as Vrăjitoarea
- Nicolae Brancomir as Înțeleptul
- Margareta Pogonat
- George Motoi (as George Mottoi)
- Corina Constantinescu as Ursitoare
- Eugenia Bosânceanu (as Eugenia Bosînceanu) as Ursitoare
- Zoe Anghel Stanca (as Zoe Anghel-Stanca) as Ursitoare
- Simona Manda
