= Petea Vâlcov =

Romanian footballer (1910–1943)

Personal information
- Full name: Petre Vâlcov
- Date of birth: 1910
- Place of birth: Bolgrad, Russian Empire
- Date of death: 16 November 1943 (aged 33)
- Place of death: Kalmyk Steppe, Soviet Union
- Position: Striker

Senior career*
| Years | Team | Apps | (Gls) |
| 1924–1930 | Mihai Viteazul Chișinău | | |
| 1930–1941 | Venus București | | |

International career
| 1933–1935 | Romania | 7 | (4) |
- * Club domestic league appearances and goals

Petre "Petea" Vâlcov (1910 – 16 November 1943) was a Romanian football player. Forming a well-known attacking triple for Venus București alongside his two brothers, Colea and Volodea, he was one of the most efficient goal-scorers in the Romanian First League.

== Career ==
He played for only two clubs : Mihai Viteazu Chişinău and Venus București. Despite his goalscoring ability, he was never the top-goalscorer of the Divizia A.

== International career ==
Petea Vâlcov made his debut for the national side in a June 1933 Balkan Cup match against Bulgaria. He had a great spell and scored two goals as Romania won 7–0. Vâlcov played a total of seven games for the Tricolours and netted four goals.

=== International Goals ===
Petea Vâlcov: International Goals
| # | Date | Venue | Opponent | Score | Result | Competition |
|---|---|---|---|---|---|---|
| 1 | 4 June 1933 | ONEF Stadium, Bucharest, Romania | Bulgaria | 7–0 | Win | Balkan Cup |
| 2 | 4 June 1933 | ONEF Stadium, Bucharest, Romania | Bulgaria | 7–0 | Win | Balkan Cup |
| 3 | 25 August 1935 | Steigerwaldstadion, Erfurt, Germany | Germany | 4–2 | Loss | Friendly |
| 4 | 25 August 1935 | Steigerwaldstadion, Erfurt, Germany | Germany | 4–2 | Loss | Friendly |

== Death ==
In 1941, Petea was enrolled in the Romanian Army and was sent on the Second World War's Eastern Front. He died in November 1943, fighting against the Soviets in the Kalmyk Steppe.

== Honours ==
Venus București

- Liga I (5): 1931–32, 1933–34, 1936–37, 1938–39, 1939–40
