= Attila Molnár (footballer, born 1897) =

Romanian footballer

Personal information
- Date of birth: 2 February 1898
- Place of birth: Kolozsvár, Austrian-Hungary
- Date of death: Unknown
- Position: Defender

Senior career*
Years	Team	Apps	(Gls)
1923–1925	Mureșul Târgu Mureș		

International career
1924	Romania	1	(0)
- * Club domestic league appearances and goals

Attila Molnár (born 2 February 1898, date of death unknown) was a Romanian footballer. He competed in the men's tournament at the 1924 Summer Olympics.
