= Colea Vâlcov =

Romanian footballer (1909–1970)

Personal information
- Full name: Nicolae Vâlcov
- Date of birth: 23 February 1909
- Place of birth: Bolgrad, Russian Empire, (now in Ukraine)
- Date of death: 31 March 1970 (aged 61)
- Positions: Full-back; winger

Senior career*
Years	Team	Apps	(Gls)
1924–1930	Mihai Viteazul Chișinău	122	(26)
1930–1938	Venus București	192	(65)
1938–1939	Telefon Club București	14	(1)
1939–1942	Turda București	65	(17)
Total		393	(109)

Managerial career
- 1947: Romania
- 1947–1948: Steaua București (assistant coach)
- 1948: Romania
- 1948–1949: Steaua București
- 1949: Romania
- 1949–1950: Petrolul Ploiești
- 1953: Progresul Casa Scânteii
- 1954: Dinamo București
- 1957–1958: Politehnica Iaşi
- 1958–1959: Torpedo Tohani
- 1960–1961: Metalul Hunedoara
- 1962–1964: Metalurgistul Cugir
- 1964: Politehnica Timişoara
- 1964–1965: Metaloglobus București
- * Club domestic league appearances and goals

Nicolae 'Colea' Vâlcov (23 February 1909 – 31 March 1970) was a Romanian football player and manager.

Vâlcov was born in Bolgrad, Russian Empire. He was part of the famous offensive line of Venus București in the 1930s, together with his brothers, Petea and Volodea. He was arguably the most talented of the three, with a great header (his most feared weapon) and good anticipation in front of the goal.

The three brothers, originally from Bessarabia, are included in the list of the greatest football players in the history of club football Venus București.

Two of his brothers had final tragics. First, Petea died on the front in 1943 World War II, on the eastern front, fighting the Soviets, And almost over a decade, Volodea died of tuberculosis. Senior Colea was the most longevity. Once after his footballer career, he became a coach for Romania, Steaua București and Dinamo București.

He was the second manager in the history of Steaua București.

== Honours ==
=== Player ===
Venus București

- National titles: 1931–32, 1933–34, 1936–37, 1938–39

=== Manager ===
Steaua București

- Romanian Cup: 1948–49
