= Nicolae Secăreanu =

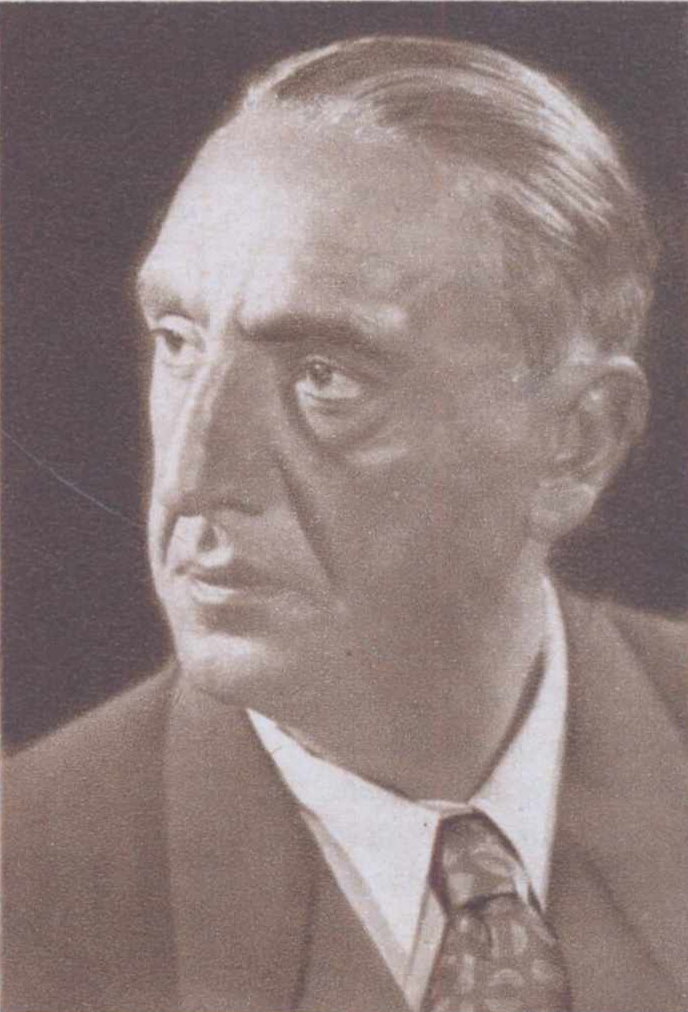
- Born: Nicolae Secăreanu; July 12, 1901; Nanov, Teleorman County, Kingdom of Romania
- Died: 29 September 1992 (aged 91); Bucharest, Romania
- Education: University of Bucharest
- Occupations: Opera singer, actor
- Years active: 1931–1988

Nicolae Secăreanu (Romanian pronunciation: [nikoˈla.e sekəˈre̯anu]; 12 July 1901 – 29 September 1992) was a well-known Romanian opera bass singer and actor.

Born in Nanov, Teleorman County, he attended the Matei Basarab High School in Bucharest and then the Law School at the University of Bucharest. He made his operatic debut on January 31, 1931 as Pimen in Mussorsky's Boris Godunov. Memorable were his 1942 performance in Berlioz's La damnation de Faust, conducted by George Enescu, and his 1945 reprise of the Boris Godunov opera, this time in the title role.

== Filmography ==
- The Lovers' Forest (1946)
- Forest of the Hanged (1965)
- Răscoala (1966) – Miron Iuga
- Faust XX (1966) – The inspector
- The Dacians (1966) – Dacian Warrior
- Sept hommes et une garce (1967) – The Italian count, father of Carlotta
- Kingdom in the Clouds (1969) – Impăratul Minciună
- Căldura (1969) – Sergiu's father
- Die Lederstrumpferzählungen ("The Last of the Mohicans") (1969, TV Mini-Series) – Old man (uncredited)
- Mihai Viteazul (1971) – Sinan Pașa
- Excerpts from the Life of a Good-For-Nothing (1973)
- Săgeata căpitanului Ion (1973) – Blind old man
- August in Flames (1973, TV Movie)
- Acțiunea Autobuzul (1978) – The boss
- The Yellow Rose (1982)
- Vacanța cea mare (1988) – (final film role)
