= 1928–29 Divizia A =

17th season of top-tier football league in Romania

Divizia A
- Season: 1928–29
- Champions: Venus București

The 1928–29 Divizia A was the seventeenth season of Divizia A, the top-level football league of Romania.

== Participating teams ==
Region	Team
Arad	Gloria CFR Arad
Bucharest	Venus București
Brașov	Colțea Brașov
Cernăuți	Dragoș Vodă Cernăuți
Chișinău	Mihai Viteazul Chișinău
Cluj	România Cluj
Craiova	Generala Craiova
Galați	Dacia Vasile Alecsandri Galați
Iași	Victoria Iași
Oradea	Stăruința Oradea
Sibiu	Șoimii Sibiu
Timișoara	Banatul Timișoara

== Final Tournament of Regions ==
=== Preliminary round ===
Team 1	Score	Team 2
Generala Craiova (Romania)	0–3	(Romania) Banatul Timișoara
Dacia Vasile Alecsandri Galați (Romania)	7–1	(Romania) Victoria Iași
Colțea Brașov (Romania)	2–1	(Romania) Șoimii Sibiu
Dragoș Vodă Cernăuți (Romania)	1–0	(Romania) Mihai Viteazul Chișinău

=== Quarters ===
Team 1	Score	Team 2
Venus București (Romania)	3–1	(Romania) Colțea Brașov
Dragoș Vodă Cernăuți (Romania)	1–0	(Romania) Dacia Vasile Alecsandri Galați
Stăruința Oradea (Romania)	2–3	(Romania) România Cluj
Banatul Timișoara (Romania)	4–4	(Romania) Gloria CFR Arad
Banatul Timișoara (Romania)	3–2	(Romania) Gloria CFR Arad

=== Semifinals ===
Team 1	Score	Team 2
Venus București (Romania)	4–3	(Romania) Dragoș Vodă Cernăuți
România Cluj (Romania)	3–0	(Romania) Banatul Timișoara

=== Final ===
September 14, 1929, Bucharest

Team 1	Score	Team 2
Venus București (Romania)	3–2 (2–0)	(Romania) România Cluj

== Champion squad ==
Venus București

Goalkeepers: Bărbulescu (13 / 0).
Defenders: Svetozar Popović (10 / 3); Drăghicescu (12 / 0); Milos Struska (6 / 0).
Midfielders: Atanase Tănăsescu (12 / 0); Nicolae Pantazi (13 / 0); I.Nicolaescu (2 / 0).
Forwards: Emanoil Dumitrescu (13 / 5); Mircea Nicolaescu (12 / 3); Țicu (7 / 3); Constantin Stanciu (11 / 3); Motoroiu (12 / 4); Vasilescu (11 / 4); Iordăchescu (5 / 3).
(league appearances and goals listed in brackets)
