= 1929–30 Divizia A =

18th season of top-tier football league in Romania

Divizia A
- Season: 1929–30
- Champions: Juventus București

The 1929–30 Divizia A was the eighteenth season of Divizia A, the top-level football league of Romania.

== Participating teams ==
Region	Team
Arad	Gloria CFR Arad
Bucharest	Juventus București
Brașov	Brașovia Brașov
Cernăuți	Dragoș Vodă Cernăuți
Chișinău	Mihai Viteazul Chișinău
Cluj	Universitatea Cluj
Craiova	Oltul Slatina
Dunărea de Jos	Dacia Unirea Brăila
Iași	Concordia Iași
Oradea	Stăruința Oradea
Sibiu	Societatea Gimnastică Sibiu
Timișoara	RGM Timișoara

== Final Tournament of Regions ==
=== Preliminary round ===
Team 1	Score	Team 2
Oltul Slatina (Romania)	0–1	(Romania) RGM Timișoara
Universitatea Cluj (Romania)	4–0	(Romania) Stăruința Oradea
Concordia Iași (Romania)	2–4	(Romania) Mihai Viteazul Chișinău
Societatea Gimnastică Sibiu (Romania)	0–0	(Romania) Brașovia Brașov
Societatea Gimnastică Sibiu (Romania)	3–0*	(Romania) Brașovia Brașov

1 The team from Brașov failed to appear, so it lost the game with 0–3, by administrative decision.

=== Quarters ===
Team 1	Score	Team 2
Dragoș Vodă Cernăuți (Romania)	2–4	(Romania) Mihai Viteazul Chișinău
Dacia Unirea Brăila (Romania)	0–16	(Romania) Juventus București
Universitatea Cluj (Romania)	7–0	(Romania) Societatea Gimnastică Sibiu
RGM Timișoara (Romania)	0–1	(Romania) Gloria CFR Arad

=== Semifinals ===
Team 1	Score	Team 2
Juventus București (Romania)	4–2	(Romania) Mihai Viteazul Chișinău
Gloria CFR Arad (Romania)	3–0	(Romania) Universitatea Cluj

=== Final ===
8 June 1930

Juventus București	3–0	Gloria CFR Arad
Raffinsky 9'; Maior II 32'; Melchior 86'

Stadionul Romcomit, Bucharest
Referee: Voiuțchi

== Champion squad ==
Juventus București

Goalkeepers: Dezideriu Lacki (7 / 0); Dumitru Bacinski (7 / 0).
Defenders: Constantin Deleanu (13 / 0); Sile Georgescu (14 / 0).
Midfielders: Tibor Remeny (13 / 1); Emerich Vogl (14 / 1); Ștefan Wetzer (14 / 1).
Forwards: Ion Maior II (8 / 2); Carlo Archimede Melchior (Italy) (10 / 9); László Raffinsky (14 / 18); Temistocle Carianopol (10 / 10); Vasile Cristescu (6 / 3); Gyula Dobo (Hungary) (7 / 4); Petre Simionescu (2 / 0); Aurel Schei (3 / 2); Gheorghe Alexandru Pavelescu (2 / 0); Rudolf Wetzer (4 / 4); Ardaș Sarian (2 / 0); Gheorghe Rădulescu (1 / 0); Andrei Bărbulescu (3 / 0).
(league appearances and goals listed in brackets)

Manager: Gyula Feldmann (Hungary) / György Hlavay (Hungary) .
