= 1931–1934 Central European Cup for Amateurs =

1931–34 Central European Cup for Amateurs
Tournament details
- Dates: 19 April 1931 – 25 March 1934
- Teams: 4

Final positions
- Champions: Romania (1st title)
- Runners-up: Hungary Amateurs
- Third place: Czechoslovakia Amateurs
- Fourth place: Austria Amateurs

Tournament statistics
- Matches played: 12
- Goals scored: 65 (5.42 per match)

The 1931–1934 Central European Cup for Amateurs was the second and last edition of the Central European International Cup for amateur teams. It was won by Romania, who took part for the first and only time.

== Final standings ==
Pos	Team	Pld	W	D	L	GF	GA	GD	Pts	Qualification
1	Romania (C)	6	4	1	1	16	9	+7	9	Winners
2	Hungary Amateurs	6	3	0	3	23	18	+5	6	
3	Czechoslovakia Amateurs	6	2	1	3	15	17	−2	5	
4	Austria Amateurs	6	2	0	4	11	21	−10	4	

Source: EU-Football
(C) Champions

== Matches ==
19 April 1931

Austria Amateurs	6–2	Hungary Amateurs
	Report

17 May 1931

Austria Amateurs	3–1	Czechoslovakia Amateurs
	Report

4 June 1931

Czechoslovakia Amateurs	3–0	Hungary Amateurs
	Report

20 September 1931
15:00 (UTC+01:00)

Romania	4–1	Czechoslovakia Amateurs
Stanciu 19'; Kocsis 28', 87'; Glanzmann 47'	Report

Stadionul Carol al II-lea, Oradea, Romania
Attendance: 8,000
Referee: Bora Vasiljević (Yugoslavia)

4 October 1932
13:00 (UTC+01:00)

Hungary Amateurs	4–0	Romania
	Report

V.A.C. Stadion, Budapest, Kingdom of Hungary
Attendance: 20,000
Referee: Ernest Fabris (Yugoslavia)

8 May 1932

Romania	4–1	Austria Amateurs
Kovács 35'; Kocsis 36', 85'; Bodola 44'	Report

Stadionul ONEF, Bucharest, Romania
Attendance: 10,000
Referee: Mihály Ivanicsics (Hungary)

26 June 1932

Czechoslovakia Amateurs	5–0	Austria Amateurs
	Report

17 September 1932

Hungary Amateurs	8–1	Austria Amateurs
	Report

16 October 1932
(UTC+01:00)

Austria Amateurs	0–1	Romania
	Report	Rónay 1'

Linzer A.S.K. Platz, Linz, Austria
Attendance: 4,000
Referee: Bohumil Ženišek (Czechoslovakia

30 October 1932

Hungary Amateurs	8–3	Austria Amateurs
	Report

24 September 1933

Romania	5–1	Hungary Amateurs
Sepi 8', 32', 47', 83'; Bindea 77'	Report

Stadionul ONEF, Bucharest, Romania
Attendance: 12,000
Referee: Nikola Dosev (Bulgaria

25 March 1934
17:00 (UTC+01:00)

Czechoslovakia Amateurs	2–2	Romania
	Report	Kovács 28'; Dobay 49'

Pardubický Stadion, Pardubice, Czechoslovakia
Attendance: 10,000
Referee: Maksymilian Schneider (Poland

== Winner ==
1931–1934 Central European Cup for Amateurs

Romania
First title

== Statistics ==
=== Goalscorers ===
There were 65 goals scored in 12 matches, for an average of 5.42 goals per match.

4 goals

- (Romania) Elemér Kocsis
- (Romania) Grațian Sepi

2 goals

- (Romania) Nicolae Kovács

1 goal

- (Romania) Andrei Glanzmann
- (Romania) Ferenc Rónay
- (Romania) Iuliu Bodola
- (Romania) Silviu Bindea
- (Romania) Ștefan Dobay
- (Romania) Constantin Stanciu
