= Dragoș Vodă Cernăuți =

Dragoş Vodă Cernăuţi (Chernivtsi)
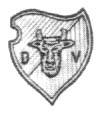
- Full name: Football Club Dragoș Vodă Cernăuți
- Nickname: Vodă
- Short name: Dragoș Vodă
- Founded: during 1909
- Dissolved: 1946
- Ground: Dragoș Vodă Stadium
- Capacity: 2 800

Dragoş Vodă Cernăuţi (Chernivtsi) is a football club from Chernivtsi, Ukraine founded in 1909. During the club's history, it was founded in Austria-Hungarian Empire, then it was transferred to Romania and then to Ukraine, where it would eventually dissolve in 1946. The name "Dragoş Vodă" came from Dragoș, the first Voivode of Moldavia.

== History ==
Dragoş Vodă Cernăuţi was founded Rumänischer Fußballklub Czernowitz (RFK Chernowitz). At the time, Cernăuţi belonged to the Austria-Hungarian Empire. In 1919, the club's name was changed to Dragoș Vodă Cernăuţi based on Dragoș, the legendary founder of the Principality of Moldova in 1352. Dragoş Vodă Cernăuţi represented the Romanian community in the city, the other ethnicities that were represented were the Germans (Jahn Cernăuți), Jews (Maccabi Cernăuți and Hakoah Cernăuți), Polish (Polonia Cernăuți), Ukrainians (Dovbuș Cernăuți).

It became the Regional Champions of Bukovina in the seasons of 1929, 1930 and 1938.

The club played in the Romanian Soccer Championship from 1928–29 and 1929–30. In 1932, a new format of Divizia A was introduced and Dragoş Vodă Cernăuţi has since been the only team from Chernivtsi to have played in this division (1937–38), before eventually getting relegated.

== Performances ==
- Liga I:
  - Semi-final (1): 1928–29
- Bukovina Championship (Romanian: Campionatul Bucovinei)
  - Winners (4): 1928–29, 1929–30, 1932–33, 1934–35

Dragoş Vodă Cernăuţi is the only team from outside Romania's present day territory to play in the First League of Romania in the division format.
