= Banatul Timișoara =

Romanian football club

- Full name: Banatul Timișoara
- Nickname(s): bănățenii
- Short name: Banatul
- Founded: 1923
- Dissolved: 1950
- Ground: Banatul, Timișoara
- Capacity: 7,000
Home colours

Banatul Timișoara was a former football club in Timișoara, Romania. The team is named after the region Banat. The team was founded in 1923 and played in the County Championship in Timiș County. The best season for them is 1928–1929. In 1927, former players at Sparta-Unirea CFR joined the team and created a stronger team winning the regional championship to qualify in 1928–29 Divizia A, the Romanian first division. The best performance of Banatul is to reach the semi-final in this season and be eliminated by Victoria Cluj. After World War II, they played in the Third League of Romania without notable performances. Banatul Timișoara disbanded in 1950.

They never played in Divizia A, the first league of Romania, since the foundation of the league format in 1932–33.

== Performances ==
- Third Place : 1928–29

Season	Played	W	D	L	Goals	+/-	Points
1928–29	4	2	1	1	10:9	+1	5p

== Literature ==
- Hardy Grüne (2000), Enzyklopädie der europäischen Fußballvereine (in German) (1. ed.), Kassel: AGON Sportverlag, p. 339, ISBN 3-89784-163-0
