= AFC Gloria Arad =

Romanian football club

Gloria Arad
- Full name: Asociația Fotbal Club; Gloria Arad
- Nicknames: Glorioșii (The Glorious Ones); Tramvaiștii (The Tram Makers); Galben-albaștrii (The Yellow and Blues)
- Short name: Gloria
- Founded: 1913 as Gloria Arad; 2021 (refounded)
- Dissolved: 2024
- 2023–24: Liga VI, Arad County, 8th

Asociația Fotbal Club Gloria Arad, also known as AFC Gloria Arad, or simply as Gloria Arad was a Romanian football club based in Arad, Arad County, currently playing in the Liga VI. The club was originally founded in 1913 by Dr. E. Veliciuiu and the colors were from the beginning yellow and blue. After World War II, the club struggled to survive and mainly played at the level of the third and fourth tiers, then in the middle of the 2000s promoted back in the Liga III, where it remained until in the early 2010s, under the ownership of Sandu Ion. Finally, the club went bankrupt in 2014, but was re-founded in the spring of 2021 by a group of persons who owned the brand of Gloria Arad.

The best achievement in the history of the "yellow and blues" was a top-flight second place at the end of the 1929–30 season.

== History ==
Period	Name
1913–1922	Gloria Arad
1922–1934	Gloria CFR Arad
1934–1949	Gloria Arad
1949–1968	ICA Arad
1968–2005	Gloria Arad
2005–2014	Gloria CTP Arad
2022–present	Gloria Arad

The club was born on August 24, 1913. Their colors were yellow and blue. The man behind the club's formation was Dr. E. Veliciuiu and with the help of Dr. Sever Miclea, Dr. E. Crâsnic, R. Moldovan, Nestor Blaga, ing. Cărpișan, I. Goicea and Coriolan Lupșa, he saw it took shape.

In 1922, the club merged with CFR Arad, founded in 1921 and took the name Gloria CFR Arad. The players that appeared then were Kiss, Hustig, Magory, Pop I, Pop II, Szabó, Müller, Cioară, Cheța, Barbu II.

In 1923, the club won the regional championship and qualified for the final tournament but was eliminated in the quarterfinals by Chinezul Timişoara.

In 1929 again won the regional championship, but was eliminated by Banatul Timișoara in the quarterfinals.

The club's best performance, before the divisional system was inaugurated, was in 1930, when the team led by Virgil Economu played in the final against Juventus București. The players that contributed, among others, were Deciu, Albu, Cosma, Igna, Marienuț, Faur, and Tisza.

Starting with 1932, until the interruption of the championship because of World War II, the club played in the First Division, with one exception, in 1939–1940. The team used in that period was: Fr. Theimler – Fr. Hustig, I. Volintir – C. Weichelt, Șt. Dobra, I. Lupaș – P. Igna, V. Tudor, Fr. Frentz, I. Marienuț, Gh. Mercea. We can also mention: Gh. Boșneag, Ion Henegar, I. Chereșledean, I. Mihailovici, Gh. Medrea, Fr. Pintea, I. Slăvei II, I. Șiclovan, Șt. Codreanu, E. Mladin, V. Nicola, I. Lupițiu, Gh. Iovicin.

After the war, the club played for two years in the Second Division, but after 1948 it disappeared from all records.

In 1969, Gloria re-appeared in the Arad County Championship (Liga IV), and was promoted to the Third Division. It played there until 1977–78 season, when it was relegated back to the Fourth Division.

In the summer of 1978, a School Sports Club of high performance was founded, and took Gloria's name further.

In recent years, the club was named Gloria CTP Arad and struggled in the Romanian Third Division, not succeeding very much.

In the summer of 2012, it relegated to the Liga IV and, after two seasons in the fourth league (2nd place in 2012–13 and 3rd in 2013–14), in the autumn of 2014, the team was dissolved.

After 9 years, the club has a new ownership, and the club would start from 2022 to 2023 season in Liga VI – Arad County.

== Chronology of names ==
Name	Period
Gloria Arad	1913–1922
Gloria CFR Arad	1922–1934
Gloria Arad	1934–2010
Gloria CTP Arad	2010–2014
Inactive*	2014–2022
Gloria Arad	2022–present

== Honours ==
Liga I

- Runners-up (1): 1929–30

Liga IV – Arad County

- Winners (4): 1969–70, 1970–71, 1974–75, 2004–05
- Runners-up (3): 1980–81, 2003–04, 2012–13

Cupa României – Arad County

- Winners (1): 2012–13

== Former managers ==
- (Romania) Virgil Economu (1928–1930)
