= Vilmos Zombori =

Romanian footballer (1906–1993)

Personal information
- Date of birth: 11 January 1906
- Place of birth: Temesvár, Austria-Hungary
- Date of death: 17 January 1993 (aged 87)
- Position: Goalkeeper

Youth career
- 1919–1925: Chinezul Timișoara

Senior career*
| Years | Team | Apps | (Gls) |
| 1925–1926 | Sparta CFR Timișoara | | |
| 1926–1930 | Chinezul Timișoara (Note: Only the statistics for the 1926–27 Divizia A season are available.) | 11 | (0) |
| 1930–1938 | Ripensia Timișoara | 44 | (5) |
| 1938–1939 | ILSA Timișoara | | |
| 1945–1947 | Politehnica Timișoara | | |
| Total | | 55 | (5) |

International career
| 1926–1935 | Romania | 6 | (0) |

Managerial career
- 1949–1951: Vulturii Lugoj
- * Club domestic league appearances and goals

Vilmos Zombori (11 January 1906 – 17 January 1993) was a Romanian footballer who played as a goalkeeper. He was also known as William Zombory.

== Club career ==
Zombori was born on 11 January 1906 in Temesvár, Austria-Hungary (now Romania), growing up in a family in which he had eight brothers. He began playing junior-level football in 1919 at Chinezul Timișoara, starting his senior career in 1925 in the regional league at Sparta CFR Timișoara. After one year he was brought back to Chinezul as a replacement for Adalbert Ritter, and won the 1926–27 title, being used by coaches Frontz Dőme and Jenő Konrád in 11 games.

In 1930, Zombori joined Ripensia Timișoara. He won the 1932–33 title, being the first-choice goalkeeper, as coach Konrád used him in 11 games in which he scored one goal, including playing in the final against Universitatea Cluj. In the following season he helped the team reach the 1934 Cupa României final, playing in both victories against "U" Cluj, winning the cup. In the 1934–35 season he won another title, coaches Josef Uridil and Rudolf Wetzer giving him only seven appearances in which he scored one goal, as Dumitru Pavlovici was first-choice goalkeeper. The team also reached the Cupa României final where he scored a goal in the 6–5 loss to CFR București. Next season, Zombori helped Ripensia win The Double, as coaches Wetzer and Konrád gave him eight appearances, but in the 5–1 win over Unirea Tricolor București in the Cupa României final, his competitor, Pavlovici was preferred. In the 1936–37 season, Zombori scored two goals in five games, then in his last season he made only one appearance, coach Sepp Pojar preferring to use Pavlovici in the other games.

He ended his career after playing for a few years in the Romanian lower leagues for ILSA Timișoara and Politehnica Timișoara.

=== Record ===
With five goals scored, Zombori is the goalkeeper with most goals scored in the Romanian top-division, Divizia A.

== International career ==
Zombori played six games for Romania, making his debut under coach Teofil Morariu on 3 October 1926 in a 3–2 win over Yugoslavia in the friendly King Alexander's Cup. He then played in a 5–1 victory against Hungary during the successful 1931–34 Central European Cup for Amateurs. Zombori played in a 2–2 draw against Switzerland in the successful 1934 World Cup qualifiers. He was selected by coaches Josef Uridil and Constantin Rădulescu to be part of the final tournament squad, where he played in a first round exit as they were defeated with 2–1 by eventual finalists, Czechoslovakia. During the 1934–35 Balkan Cup that was hosted by Greece, Romania had to face Yugoslavia in the last game of the tournament which, if won, could have earned them the trophy. However, its goalkeeper Anghel Crețeanu got injured, so coach Alexandru Săvulescu asked for Andrei Sepci and Zombori to come for the match. Eventually, Zombori played in the game against the Yugoslavs which ended with a 4–0 loss, that being his last appearance for the national team.

== After retirement ==
After he ended his playing career, Zombori coached Vulturii Lugoj from 1949 until 1951. He subsequently served as a referee until 1957.

== Death ==
Zombori died on 17 January 1993 at age 87.

== Honours ==
Chinezul Timișoara

- Divizia A: 1926–27

Ripensia Timișoara

- Divizia A: 1932–33, 1934–35, 1935–36, 1937–38
- Cupa României: 1933–34, 1935–36, runner-up 1934–35

Romania

- Central European International Cup: 1931–34

Individual

- Most goals scored by a goalkeeper in Divizia A: 5 goals
