= Rudolf Bürger =

Romanian footballer and coach (1908–1980)

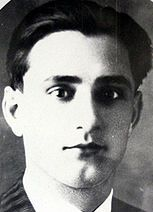

Personal information
- Date of birth: 31 October 1908
- Place of birth: Temesvár, Austria-Hungary
- Date of death: 20 January 1980 (aged 71)
- Position: Defender

Youth career
- 1920–1923: ESE Timișoara
- 1923: CS Tricolor Timișoara
- 1924: ETC Timișoara
- 1924–1926: Chinezul Timișoara

Senior career*
Years	Team	Apps	(Gls)
1926–1930	Chinezul Timișoara (Note: Only statistics for the 1926–27 Divizia A season are available.)	1	(0)
1930–1941	Ripensia Timișoara	122	(0)
Total		123	(0)

International career
1929–1939	Romania	34	(0)

Managerial career
- 1939–1940: Ripensia Timișoara
- 1942–1946: Politehnica Timișoara
- 1946–1948: CAM Timișoara
- 1948–1950: ASA Timișoara
- 1950: Politehnica Timișoara
- 1951–1952: Electroputere Craiova
- CFR Timișoara
- * Club domestic league appearances and goals

Rudolf Bürger (31 October 1908 – 20 January 1980) was a Romanian international footballer and coach of German ethnicity.

He is one of a few men who participated in each of the three pre-World War II FIFA World Cups. At club level, he played mostly for Ripensia Timișoara with whom he won several trophies.

== Club career ==
Bürger was born on 31 October 1908 in Temesvár, Austria-Hungary (now Romania), growing up and starting to play football as a child in the Elisabetin neighborhood. In 1920 he started to play junior-level football at local club, ESE. Afterwards he moved to CS Tricolor, then he went to ETC, arriving in 1924 at Chinezul Timișoara. In the 1926–27 season he played one league game for Chinezul as the team won the title.

In 1931, Bürger joined Ripensia Timișoara where he made his Divizia A debut on 11 September 1932 in a 3–2 away loss to CFR București. He won the title in his first season, with coach Jenő Konrád using him in 12 games, including playing in the final against Universitatea Cluj. In the following season he helped the team reach the 1934 Cupa României final, playing in both victories over "U" Cluj, winning the cup. In the 1934–35 season he won another title, coaches Josef Uridil and Rudolf Wetzer giving him 17 appearances, also the team reached the Cupa României final where he played the entire match in the 6–5 loss to CFR București. Next season, Bürger helped Ripensia win The Double, being given 18 appearances by coaches Wetzer and Konrád, and he played in the 5–1 win over Unirea Tricolor București in the Cupa României final. In the following Cupa României edition, the team reached another final in which he played all the minutes in the 5–1 loss to Rapid București. In the 1937–38 season, Ripensia won another title, with coach Sepp Pojar using him in 17 matches. Afterwards he played in Ripensia's 3–0 win over AC Milan in the first leg of the first round of the 1938 Mitropa Cup, helping the team get past the Italians. He made his last Divizia A appearance in a 0–0 draw against Rapid.

== International career ==
Bürger played 34 games for Romania, making his debut on 15 September 1929 under coach Constantin Rădulescu in a friendly that ended in a 3–2 away victory against Bulgaria. He made three appearances in the successful 1929–31 Balkan Cup, consisting of two victories against Yugoslavia and Greece, and a loss to Bulgaria.

Bürger was selected by coach Rădulescu to be part of the squad for the 1930 World Cup where he played in both Group 3 matches, a 3–1 win over Peru and a 4–0 loss to hosts and eventual world champions, Uruguay. Four years later he was selected by coaches Rădulescu and Josef Uridil to be part of Romania's squad that went to the 1934 World Cup in Italy, but remained on the bench in the 2–1 defeat to eventual finalists, Czechoslovakia in the first round.

He helped his national team win another Balkan Cup in 1936, playing in two victories against Greece and Bulgaria. Bürger was selected by coaches Alexandru Săvulescu and Rădulescu to be part of the squad that participated in the 1938 World Cup in France. He played for the entirety of both games against Cuba, the first one being a 3–3 draw, followed by a surprising 2–1 loss in the replay.

His last appearance for The Tricolours was in a friendly that took place on 24 May 1939 and ended in a 2–0 loss to England in which Bürger injured his knee.

== Managerial career ==
Bürger coached Politehnica Timișoara from 1942 until 1946. Afterwards he moved to CAM Timișoara for the next two years. His next spell was at ASA Timișoara from 1948 to 1951, then he went to Electroputere Craiova for one year from 1951 to 1952 and later worked at CFR Timișoara.

== Death ==
Bürger died on 19 January 1980 at the age of 71.

== Honours ==
=== Player ===
Chinezul Timișoara

- Divizia A: 1926–27

Ripensia Timișoara

- Divizia A: 1932–33, 1934–35, 1935–36, 1937–38, runner-up 1933–34, 1938–39
- Cupa României: 1933–34, 1935–36, runner-up 1934–35, 1936–37

Romania

- Balkan Cup: 1929–31, 1936
