= Andrei Sepci =

Romanian former footballer

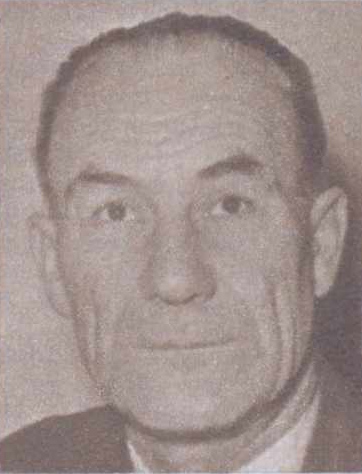

Personal information
- Date of birth: 7 October 1911
- Place of birth: Barnabas, Máramaros, Austria-Hungary
- Date of death: 3 December 1992 (aged 81)
- Position: Goalkeeper

Youth career
- 1922–1927: Școala Sportivă Sătmăreană Satu Mare

Senior career*
Years	Team	Apps	(Gls)
1927–1932	Olimpia Satu Mare		
1932–1937	Universitatea Cluj	93	(1)
1937–1939	Tricolor Baia Mare		
1939–1940	Victoria Cluj	22	(0)
Total		115	(1)

International career^{‡}
1933–1935	Romania	4	(0)

Managerial career
- 1940–1946: Minaur Baia Mare
- 1946–1947: Explosivi Făgăraș
- 1948–1949: Concordia Ploiești
- 1949: Știința Cluj
- 1952: Petrolul Ploiești
- 1955–1959: Jiul Petroșani
- 1959–1961: Știința Cluj
- 1961–1962: Dinamo Bacău
- 1963: Știința Cluj
- 1964–1966: Știința Cluj
- 1967–1968: Minerul Baia Mare
- 1970–1971: Universitatea Cluj
- * Club domestic league appearances and goals as of 31 December 2019 ‡ National team caps and goals as of 31 December 2019

Andrei Sepci (7 October 1911 – 3 December 1992) was a Romanian footballer and manager. He was the manager that guided Știința Cluj in its successful 1964–65 Cupa României campaign.

== Club career ==
Sepci was born on 7 October 1911 in Barnabas, Máramaros, Austria-Hungary (now Ukraine), and began playing junior-level football in 1922 at Școala Sportivă Sătmăreană Satu Mare. Subsequently, in 1927 he joined Olimpia Satu Mare where he played in the regional league. In 1932 he went to play for Universitatea Cluj, making his Divizia A debut under coach Adalbert Kovács on 11 September in a 3–1 away win over AMEF Arad. By the end of his first season, the team reached the final of the championship which was lost with 5–3 on aggregate to Ripensia Timișoara, Sepci playing in all 14 games of the campaign. Even though he conceded five goals in the first leg of the final against Ripensia, the newspaper Gazeta Sporturilor praised his performance: "He was not to blame for any of the goals scored by Ripensia. If Universitatea still has a chance at a comeback, it is thanks to Sepci". In the following season he helped them reach the 1934 Cupa României final, being used by coach Adalbert Molnar in both games against Ripensia which won the cup. On 8 December 1935, he scored the only goal of his career in a 5–0 win over CFR București. In 1937 he went to play for two seasons in Divizia B at Tricolor Baia Mare. Afterwards, Sepci returned to Divizia A football at Victoria Cluj where he made his last first league appearance on 26 November 1939 in a 2–2 draw against UD Reșița, totaling 115 games with one goal scored in the competition.

== International career ==
Sepci played four games for Romania, making his debut on 4 June 1933 under coach Constantin Rădulescu in a 7–0 victory against Bulgaria in the 1933 Balkan Cup. In the following two games, which were during the same competition, he kept two more clean sheets in victories against Greece and Yugoslavia, helping his side win the tournament. Politician Alexandru Vaida-Voievod gave him a snuff box made of silver as a token of appreciation for not conceding any goals. The tournament was known in Romania as Balacaniada lui 13–0 (English: The Balkans of 13–0) and Sepci considered it his playing career's biggest accomplishment: "The best memory of my life as a goalkeeper? The Balkans of 1933. The golden dream of every goalkeeper: not to concede a goal. And this in three consecutive games: with Bulgaria (7–0), with Greece (1–0) and with Yugoslavia (5–0). I will never forget that day when the Bucharest students accompanied me to the North Station, while hundreds of enthusiastic people were waiting for me in Cluj, with ovations and flowers. I asked myself then: "Why are they celebrating me?" And I found out the answer later: because every time a hero must be found. For me, however, in the Balkans of 1933, all the players in the team were heroes (...) Many more years will pass, maybe my grandsons will grow up to be men in all the power of the word, but I will still continue to tell them and their children about the unforgettable Balkans of 1933, with its memorable record: 13 goals scored, zero conceded".

During the 1934–35 Balkan Cup that was hosted by Greece, Romania had to face Yugoslavia in the last game of the tournament which, if won, could have earned them the trophy. However, its goalkeeper Anghel Crețeanu got injured, so coach Alexandru Săvulescu asked for Sepci and Vilmos Zombori to come for the match. Sepci boarded a plane piloted by Gheorghe Bănciulescu, but was unable to attend the fixture after the aircraft experienced engine trouble and was compelled to return. When the plane was in the air and had those problems, Sepci wanted to jump off it with a parachute, as Bănciulescu told the press: "The real hero of the Balkans from Athens is Sepci, who, despite the cold, voluntarily and bravely undertook this flight, just to help his team. Before takeoff, I also installed his parachute and instructed him when and how to jump from the plane, if we were in danger. We were at an altitude of 1,000 meters when the engine began to cough and I had to make some complicated maneuvers to look for a favorable place to return to the ground. Suddenly, I look back and see that Sepci, parachute in hand, was ready to jump into the void. At the last moment I managed to pull him back, because on his face you could read the unmoved determination, sister to death. This moment saved the player's life as the parachute was so tangled on him that it would never have opened and Sepci would have crashed to his death on the ground". Eventually, Zombori played in the game against the Yugoslavs which ended with a 4–0 loss. Sepci made his final appearance for the national team when coach Constantin Rădulescu sent him at half-time to replace Crețeanu in a 2–2 draw against Greece in the 1935 Balkan Cup.

== Managerial career ==
Sepci started coaching in 1940 at Minaur Baia Mare where he stayed until 1946. Subsequently, he went for one year at Explosivi Făgăraș, then from 1948 until 1949 he coached Concordia Ploiești. In the second half of the 1948–49 Divizia A season he was brought to Știința Cluj to replace Ștefan Cârjan, finishing the season in 12th place. In 1952 he coached Petrolul Ploiești for a short while, then he went to Jiul Petroșani for a few seasons, managing to maintain the club in middle positions, away from relegation. In 1959 Sepci returned to Știința Cluj, leading the team for two seasons, finishing in fifth place in the first season and in fourth in the second. In 1961 he went to coach Dinamo Bacău for one year and a half, then returned for a third spell at Știința, leading the team in the first half of the 1963–64 season, being replaced with Mircea Luca for the second. However, Sepci returned to the club in the following season, winning the Cupa României at the end of it after a 2–1 victory against Dinamo Pitești in the final. He then led the club in the 1965–66 European Cup Winners' Cup, eliminating Austrian team Wiener Neustadt with 3–0 on aggregate in the first round, but got eliminated in the following round by Atlético Madrid. From 1967 he worked at Știința's center for juniors and children, helping it win four junior level national titles. He also had a last spell for the senior squad when he came in March 1970 and finished the season in 11th place. Then he led them for the entire following season when the team finished in 12th place. Sepci has a total of 319 matches as a manager in the Romanian top-division, Divizia A, consisting of 114 victories, 76 draws and 129 losses.

=== Managing style ===
Remus Câmpeanu, who was coached by Sepci at Știința Cluj described him: "He was a coach who talked a lot with us individually. Before the matches, he would spend half an hour or an hour talking with each one of us. He would talk about our qualities, but also about our flaws, something he never did in full, in front of others. Under his hand, players have grown precisely because of this patience. In the games you could see that the team was playing a certain way. He knew how to ask the players what they could do."

== Death ==
Sepci died on 3 December 1992 at the age of 81.

== Honours ==
=== Player ===
Universitatea Cluj

- Divizia A runner-up: 1932–33
- Cupa României runner-up: 1933–34

Romania

- Balkan Cup: 1933

=== Manager ===
Universitatea Cluj

- Cupa României: 1964–65
