= Rudolf Kotormány =

Romanian footballer and coach

Personal information
- Date of birth: 23 January 1911
- Place of birth: Temesvár, Austria-Hungary
- Date of death: 2 August 1983 (aged 72)
- Height: 1.78 m (5 ft 10 in)
- Position: Defender

Youth career
- 1922: Fortuna Timișoara

Senior career*
| Years | Team | Apps | (Gls) |
| 1930–1931 | Chinezul Timișoara | | |
| 1931–1942 | Ripensia Timișoara | 146 | (11) |
| 1946–1947 | CFR Timișoara | 4 | (0) |
| Total | | 150 | (11) |

International career
| 1932–1938 | Romania | 9 | (0) |

Managerial career
- 1946: CFR Craiova
- 1946–1947: CFR Timișoara
- 1948–1953: Romitex Timișoara
- 1953: Metalul Hunedoara
- 1954–1956: Metalul Cugir
- 1956–1957: Metalul Oțelu Roșu
- 1963–1967: Metalul Oțelu Roșu
- * Club domestic league appearances and goals

Rudolf Kotormány (23 January 1911 – 2 August 1983), also spelled in Romanian as Cotormani, was a Romanian international footballer who played as a defender and coach.

== Club career ==
Kotormány, nicknamed Fachirul (English: The Fakir), was born on 23 January 1911 in Temesvár, Austria-Hungary (now Romania), growing up and starting to play football as a child in the Mehala neighborhood. At age 10 he began playing football at local club Fortuna. In 1930 he started his senior career, as he went to play for Chinezul Timișoara.

In 1931, Kotormány joined Ripensia Timișoara where he made his Divizia A debut on 11 September 1932 in a 3–2 away loss to CFR București. He won the title in his first season, with coach Jenő Konrád using him in 13 games in which he scored one goal, including playing in the final against Universitatea Cluj. In the following season he helped the team reach the 1934 Cupa României final, playing in both victories over "U" Cluj, winning the cup. In the 1934–35 season he won another title, coaches Josef Uridil and Rudolf Wetzer giving him 17 appearances in which he scored once, also the team reached the Cupa României final where he played the entire match in the 6–5 loss to CFR București. Next season, Kotormány helped Ripensia win The Double, being given 18 appearances by coaches Wetzer and Konrád, and he played in the 5–1 win over Unirea Tricolor București in the Cupa României final. In the following Cupa României edition, the team reached another final in which he played the full 90 minutes in the 5–1 loss to Rapid București. In the 1937–38 season, Ripensia won another title, coach Sepp Pojar using him in 15 matches in which he netted two goals. Afterwards he played in Ripensia's 3–0 win over AC Milan in the first leg of the first round of the 1938 Mitropa Cup, helping the team get past the Italians.

He ended his career after playing in the 1946–47 season for CFR Timișoara, making his last Divizia A appearance on 10 November 1946 in a 6–2 home loss to ITA Arad, totaling 150 matches with 31 goals in the competition.

== International career ==
Kotormány played nine games for Romania. He made his debut on 16 October 1932 under coach Constantin Rădulescu in a 1–0 away win over Austria in the successful 1931–1934 Central European Cup for Amateurs in which he also played in a 5–1 victory against rivals Hungary and a draw against Czechoslovakia. He would also win the 1933 Balkan Cup, appearing in a 5–0 win over Yugoslavia after which the press classified him as the "master of the field". Kotormány played in a 2–2 draw against Switzerland and in a 2–1 home win over Yugoslavia in the successful 1934 World Cup qualifiers. Afterwards he was selected by coaches Rădulescu and Josef Uridil to be part of the squad that went to the final tournament in Italy, playing the entire match in the 2–1 defeat to eventual finalists, Czechoslovakia in the first round. He won his second Balkan Cup in 1936, playing in a 4–1 victory against Bulgaria. His last appearance for The Tricolours took place on 6 September 1938 in a 1–1 draw against Yugoslavia in the friendly 1937–38 Eduard Benes Cup.

== Managerial career ==
Kotormány coached CFR Timișoara during the 1946–47 Divizia A season while still being an active player. In 1953 he coached Metalul Hunedoara in the same league. He also had coaching spells in the Romanian lower leagues for teams such as Metalul Cugir or Metalul Oțelu Roșu.

== Style of play ==
His former Ripensia colleague, Balázs Hoksary, praised Kotormány's heading ability:"Ripensia did not make a wall for free kicks, although the wall was already fashionable. Instead, Kotormany would stand alone nine meters from the execution spot. He felt the ball, regardless of speed, and put his head. Almost all the balls hit his head. And, since it came to heading, we must admit that Kotormany's remained unsurpassed. For years in a row he made balls disappear as if by magic from the heads of Sindelar or Sárosi. Kotormany dominated the entire field. He had an impressive aerial positioning, taking the balls out of his own box and he was very dangerous in the opponent's box, especially at corners".

== Death ==
Kotormány died on 2 August 1983 in Timișoara at age 72.

== Honours ==
=== Player ===
Ripensia Timișoara

- Divizia A: 1932–33, 1934–35, 1935–36, 1937–38, runner-up 1933–34, 1938–39
- Cupa României: 1933–34, 1935–36, runner-up 1934–35, 1936–37

Romania

- Balkan Cup: 1933, 1936
- Central European International Cup: 1931–34
