= Grațian Sepi =

Romanian footballer

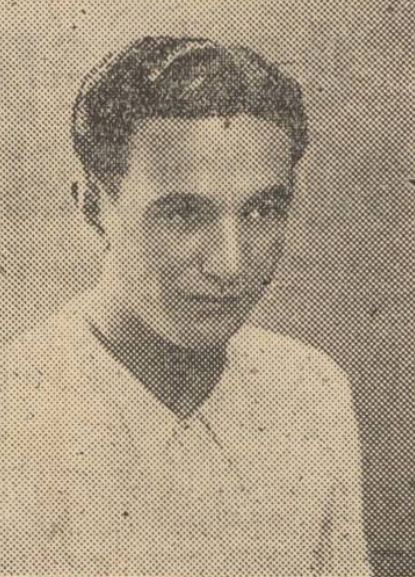
- Rampa newspaper, 1936

Personal information
- Date of birth: 30 December 1910
- Place of birth: Valkány, Austria-Hungary
- Date of death: 6 March 1977 (aged 67)
- Place of death: Timișoara, Romania
- Position: Striker

Youth career
- 1922–1924: Politehnica Timișoara
- 1924–1925: Banatul Timișoara

Senior career*
Years	Team	Apps	(Gls)
1925–1928	Politehnica Timișoara		
1928–1929	Banatul Timișoara		
1929–1930	România Cluj		
1931	Universitatea Cluj	1	(7)
1932	Ripensia Timișoara		
1932–1934	Universitatea Cluj	32	(33)
1934–1937	Venus București	39	(27)
1937–1939	Ripensia Timișoara	16	(7)
1939–1942	UM Cugir		
Total		81	(58)

International career
1928–1937	Romania	23	(14)

Managerial career
- 1940–1942: UM Cugir
- CFR Timișoara
- * Club domestic league appearances and goals

Grațian Sepi (30 December 1910 – 6 March 1977) was a Romanian footballer who played as a striker.

== Club career ==
Sepi, nicknamed "The Tank from the Balkans" or "The Brunette Sindelar", was born on 30 December 1910 in Valkány, Austria-Hungary, the second of three sons. After spending the first few years in Valkány, his family moved to Timișoara where he grew up in the Mehala neighborhood. He started playing junior level football in 1922 at local club Politehnica. In 1924, he moved to neighboring club Banatul, but returned to Politehnica after a short while, playing three seasons there. In the 1928–29 season he played for Banatul, reaching the semi-finals of the national league where they were defeated with 3–0 by România Cluj, a team for whom he would play in the following season.

In 1931, Sepi joined Universitatea Cluj and in his first season he scored seven goals in a 7–1 win over Haggibor Cluj in the regional championship. After a brief stint with Ripensia Timișoara, Sepi returned to "U" Cluj where he scored six goals against Haggibor in a 17–0 victory in the regional championship. In the 1932–33 season, The Red Caps reached the championship final, losing to Ripensia Timișoara despite Sepi scoring a goal. Ripensia also defeated them in the 1934 Cupa României final, but he did not play in it as he was injured badly in the semi-finals against UD Reșița.

Afterwards, Sepi was transferred from "U" Cluj to Venus București for a total fee of 140,000 Romanian lei. There, in the 1935–36 season he scored 18 goals which made him the second top-scorer of the league, having five goals fewer than CFR București's Ștefan Barbu. In the following season he helped the team win the title, scoring once in the six games coach Ferenc Plattkó used him. In 1937, Sepi went to play for Ripensia Timișoara where in his first season coach Sepp Pojar used him in 10 matches in which he netted seven goals which helped the club win the title. On 14 May 1939 he made his last Divizia A appearance in Ripensia's 3–0 away loss to Sportul Studențesc București. Sepi ended his career in 1942 after playing in the Romanian lower leagues for UM Cugir.

== International career ==
Sepi played 23 games for Romania, captaining six of them, and scored 14 goals, making his debut on 15 April 1928 under coach Teofil Morariu in a 4–2 home win in a friendly over Turkey in which he scored a goal. As he was 17 years, three months and 16 days old at his debut, Sepi was the youngest debutant in history for Romania, a record held for 86 years until May 2014 when Cristian Manea broke it.

He played four games and scored three goals in three victories against Yugoslavia, Bulgaria and Greece in the successful 1929–31 Balkan Cup. In a friendly against Poland in August 1931, after scoring a brace in the 3–2 victory, Sepi was praised by the Gazeta Sporturilor newspaper:"Today, Gați is just as popular in Warsaw as he is in Cluj. The several hundred flowers received at the hotel where the Romanian team was staying, prove, abundantly, the Slavic exuberance of the Polish maidens, who will from now on caress their dreams with the face of the handsome captain of the Romanian national team". He won another tournament, the 1931–1934 Central European Cup for Amateurs in which he played four games and scored four times in a 5–1 win over Hungary.

Sepi netted one goal in a 2–2 draw against Switzerland during the successful 1934 World Cup qualifiers. Subsequently, he was selected by coaches Josef Uridil and Constantin Rădulescu to be part of the final tournament squad in Italy where he played the entire first-round match, a 2–1 defeat to eventual finalists, Czechoslovakia. In the following years, Sepi played in two games in the 1935 Balkan Cup, making his last appearance for the national team as captain on 8 July 1937 in a 2–0 friendly victory over Lithuania.

=== International goals ===
Scores and results list Romania's goal tally first, score column indicates score after each Sepi goal.

List of international goals scored by Grațian Sepi
#	Date	Venue	Opponent	Score	Result	Competition
1	15 April 1928	Stadionul Gloria CFR, Arad, Romania	Turkey	3–1	4–2	Friendly match
2	15 September 1929	Levski Field, Sofia, Bulgaria	Bulgaria	1–0	3–2	Friendly match
3	6 October 1929	Stadionul ANEF, Bucharest, Romania	Yugoslavia	1–0	2–1	1929–31 Balkan Cup
4	10 May 1931	Stadionul ANEF, Bucharest, Romania	Bulgaria	1–0	5–2	1929–31 Balkan Cup
5	23 August 1931	Stadion Wojska Polskiego, Warsaw, Poland	Poland	1–0	3–2	Friendly match
6	23 August 1931	Stadion Wojska Polskiego, Warsaw, Poland	Poland	3–0	3–2	Friendly match
7	26 August 1931	LFLS Stadionas, Kaunas, Lithuania	Lithuania	3–2	4–2	Friendly match
8	29 November 1931	Leoforos Alexandras Stadium, Athens, Greece	Greece	3–2	4–2	1929–31 Balkan Cup
9	24 September 1933	Stadionul ANEF, Bucharest, Romania	Hungary	1–0	5–1	1931–1934 Central European Cup for Amateurs
10	24 September 1933	Stadionul ANEF, Bucharest, Romania	Hungary	2–0	5–1	1931–1934 Central European Cup for Amateurs
11	24 September 1933	Stadionul ANEF, Bucharest, Romania	Hungary	3–1	5–1	1931–1934 Central European Cup for Amateurs
12	24 September 1933	Stadionul ANEF, Bucharest, Romania	Hungary	5–1	5–1	1931–1934 Central European Cup for Amateurs
13	29 October 1933	Wankdorf Stadium, Bern, Switzerland	Switzerland	2–0	2–2	1934 World Cup qualifiers
14	3 November 1935	Stadionul ANEF, Bucharest, Romania	Poland	4–1	4–1	Friendly match

== Managerial career ==
Sepi started his coaching career in the Romanian lower leagues at UM Cugir in 1940 as a player-coach. He then worked at CFR Timișoara.

== Style of play ==
In the book Ripensia – Nostalgii fotbalistice (Ripensia – Football nostalgia), author Cristian Alexe describes Sepi's style of play:"Sepi II was considered a technical player, who "tamed" the ball with ease. At the same time, he also managed to impose himself through physical force, which is where he got his nickname of "Tank from the Balkans". It seemed like the easiest thing in the world for him to pass the ball between five opponents, slip subtly to the front of the goal and from there hit the ball full and relentless".

== Personal life ==
His brothers, Silviu and Valeriu, were also footballers and they all played together in the 1920s for Politehnica Timișoara. Valeriu won a league title with UD Reșița and was teammates with Sepi for one season at Universitatea Cluj.

== Death ==
Sepi died on 6 March 1977 in Timișoara at age 67, after suffering from a brain tumor.

== Honours ==
Universitatea Cluj

- Divizia A runner-up: 1932–33
- Cupa României runner-up: 1933–34

Venus București

- Divizia A: 1936–37

Ripensia Timișoara

- Divizia A: 1937–38, runner-up 1938–39

Romania

- Balkan Cup: 1929–31
- Central European International Cup: 1931–34
