= Vasile Deheleanu =

Romanian footballer

Personal information
- Date of birth: 12 August 1910
- Place of birth: Temesvár, Austria-Hungary
- Date of death: 30 April 2003 (aged 92)
- Place of death: Timișoara, Romania
- Position: Midfielder

Youth career
- 1924–1925: Unirea Timișoara

Senior career*
Years	Team	Apps	(Gls)
1925–1928	Politehnica Timișoara		
1928–1931	România Cluj		
1931–1932	UD Reșița		
1932–1939	Ripensia Timișoara	73	(5)

International career
1934–1935	Romania	5	(0)

Managerial career
- 1945–1947: Electrica Timișoara
- 1950: Politehnica Timișoara
- 1955–1956: Politehnica Timișoara
- 1958–1959: Politehnica Timișoara
- Locomotiva Timișoara
- * Club domestic league appearances and goals

Vasile Deheleanu (12 August 1910 – 30 April 2003) was a Romanian footballer who played in midfield and coach.

== Club career ==
Deheleanu was born on 12 August 1910 in Temesvár, Austria-Hungary and grew up in the Mehala neighborhood. He began playing junior-level football at local club Unirea. In 1925 he moved to neighboring club Politehnica and there he met Tony Cargnelli whom he would consider the best coach of his career. In 1928 he went to play for România Cluj where in his first season, the team reached the final of the national league where they were defeated with 3–2 by Venus București. In 1931 he went to play for one season at UD Reșița with whom he reached another championship final which was lost with 3–0 to Venus București.

In 1932, Deheleanu joined Ripensia Timișoara, winning the title in his first season, coach Jenő Konrád using him in eight games in which he scored one goal, including playing in the final against Universitatea Cluj. In the following season he helped the team reach the 1934 Cupa României final, playing in both wins over "U" Cluj, winning the cup. In the 1934–35 season he won another title, coaches Josef Uridil and Rudolf Wetzer giving him 21 appearances in which he scored three goals, also the team reached the Cupa României final where he played the entire match in the 6–5 loss to CFR București. Next season, Deheleanu helped Ripensia win The Double, being given nine appearances by coaches Wetzer and Konrád, but he did not play in the 5–1 win over Unirea Tricolor București in the Cupa României final. In the following Cupa României edition, the team reached another final in which he played the entire match in the 5–1 loss to Rapid București. In the 1937–38 season, Ripensia won another title but coach Sepp Pojar used him in only two matches. Afterwards he played in Ripensia's 3–0 win over AC Milan in the first leg of the first round of the 1938 Mitropa Cup, helping the team get past the Italians.

== International career ==
Deheleanu played five games for Romania, making his debut on 29 April 1934 under coach Constantin Rădulescu in a 2–1 home win against Yugoslavia in the 1934 World Cup qualifiers. After the game, Deheleanu was named "Man of the match" by the Gazeta Sporturilor newspaper that wrote: "Our opinion is that Deheleanu was indeed the most deserving Romanian in Sunday's game. With his sober but regular game, with his perfect intuition as a midfielder par excellence, Deheleanu richly deserves the title given to him by the public as well as our trophy". Afterwards he was selected by coaches Josef Uridil and Rădulescu to be part of the squad that went to the final tournament in Italy where he played the entire match in the first round, a 2–1 defeat to eventual finalists, Czechoslovakia. His last appearance for the national team took place on 3 November 1935, a friendly against Poland that ended with a 4–1 home win.

== Managerial career ==
Deheleanu started coaching in 1945 at Electrica Timișoara in the Romanian lower leagues where he stayed until 1947. In 1948 he won the national junior championship with Ripensia Timișoara.

Deheleanu had several spells at Politehnica Timișoara in Divizia A, consisting of 39 games of which 14 were victories, 10 draws and 15 losses, his best performance being a third place in 1950. He also coached Locomotiva Timișoara and several other teams from the Timiș county.

== Style of play ==
Deheleanu was known for his aerial play and the ability to dispossess his opponents through sliding, a rarity at the time.

Balázs Hoksary, a former Ripensia teammate described Dehelanu as a player who worked a lot for the team:"He put a lot of heart into every game. It cannot be said that he did not have a personal style of play, but he was, first of all, extremely useful to the team, he mobilized exemplary and knew how to mobilize the whole team to lead it to victory".

== Death ==
Deheleanu died on 30 April 2003 in Timișoara at age 92.

== Honours ==
=== Player ===
România Cluj

- Divizia A runner-up: 1928–29

UD Reșița

- Divizia A runner-up: 1931–32

Ripensia Timișoara

- Divizia A: 1932–33, 1934–35, 1935–36, 1937–38, runner-up 1933–34, 1938–39
- Cupa României: 1933–34, 1935–36, runner-up 1934–35, 1936–37
