= Zoltán Beke =

Romanian football player and coach

Personal information
- Date of birth: 30 July 1911
- Place of birth: Fehértemplom (Bela Crkva), Austria-Hungary (now in Serbia)
- Date of death: 5 March 1994 (aged 82)
- Place of death: Timișoara, Romania
- Position: Striker

Youth career
- 1925–1928: Chinezul Timișoara

Senior career*
Years	Team	Apps	(Gls)
1928–1930	Chinezul Timișoara		
1930–1941	Ripensia Timișoara	89	(21)
1941–1943	CFR Turnu Severin (Note: The Divizia A 1940–41 was the last season before World War II and the Divizia A 1946–47 was the first one after, so the appearances during this period for CFR Turnu Severin are not official.)	0	(0)
1943–1944	Kolozsvári VSC	13	(7)
1946–1947	CFR Turnu Severin		
Total		102	(28)

International career
1935–1937	Romania	6	(0)

Managerial career
- 1942–1943: CFR Turnu Severin
- 1946–1947: CFR Turnu Severin
- 1948–1965: Știința Timișoara (youth)
- 1965–1970: IRA Timișoara
- * Club domestic league appearances and goals

Zoltán Beke (Serbian: Zoltan Beke) (30 July 1911 – 5 March 1994) was a Romanian football player and coach of Hungarian ethnicity who played as a striker. He was a member of Romania's team that competed in the 1934 World Cup, but he did not play in any match.

== Club career ==
Beke was born on 30 July 1911 in Fehértemplom, Austria-Hungary (now Serbia). He grew up and started to play football in the Mehala neighborhood of Timișoara, Romania. In 1925 he began playing junior-level football at Chinezul Timișoara. Three years later he started his senior career at Chinezul.

In 1930, Beke joined Ripensia Timișoara where he made his Divizia A debut on 11 September 1932 in a 3–2 away loss to CFR București. He won the title in his first season, with coach Jenő Konrád using him in four games in which he scored once. In the following season he helped the team reach the 1934 Cupa României final, playing in the first leg against Universitatea Cluj, which led to them winning the cup. In the 1934–35 season he won another title, coaches Josef Uridil and Rudolf Wetzer giving him 14 appearances in which he scored three goals, also the team reached the Cupa României final where he played the entire match in the 6–5 loss to CFR București. Next season, Beke helped Ripensia win The Double, being given 12 appearances in which he netted five goals by coaches Wetzer and Konrád, and he played in the 5–1 win over Unirea Tricolor București in the Cupa României final. In the following Cupa României edition, the team reached another final, but he did not play in the 5–1 loss to Rapid București. In the 1937–38 season, Ripensia won another title, but coach Sepp Pojar used him in only seven matches in which he netted one goal. Afterwards he played in Ripensia's 3–0 win over AC Milan in the first leg of the first round of the 1938 Mitropa Cup, helping the team get past the Italians. He made his last Divizia A appearance in a 2–2 draw against Gloria Arad, totaling 89 matches with 21 goals in the competition, all of them for Ripensia.

In 1942, Beke joined CFR Turnu Severin where he was a player-coach, helping the club win the 1942–43 Cupa României, though he did not play in the final.

Afterwards he went to play for Kolozsvári VSC, making his Nemzeti Bajnokság I debut on 22 August 1943 under coach Zoltán Opata in a 3–1 home win against Diósgyőr. He made a total of 13 league appearances, netting seven goals, including a double in his last game which was a 3–0 victory against BSZKRT. Kolozsvári also reached the 1943–44 Magyar Kupa final but he did not play in the defeat to Ferencváros.

Beke ended his career by playing in the 1946–47 Divizia B season for CFR Turnu Severin.

== International career ==
Beke was selected by coaches Constantin Rădulescu and Josef Uridil to be part of Romania's squad that went to the 1934 World Cup in Italy but remained on the bench in the 2–1 defeat to eventual finalists, Czechoslovakia in the first round.

He played six matches for the national team, making his debut on 25 August 1934 under coach Rădulescu in a friendly which ended with a 4–2 away loss to Germany. He helped the team win the 1936 Balkan Cup, playing in two victories against Greece and Bulgaria. His last appearance for The Tricolours was in a friendly which took place on 10 June 1937 and ended with a 2–1 home win over Belgium.

== Managerial career ==
Beke's first coaching spell started in 1942 when he was a player-coach at CFR Turnu Severin, helping the club win the 1942–43 Cupa României after a 4–0 victory against Sportul Studențesc București in the final. Afterwards he trained the youth teams of Știința Timișoara. For five years, between 1965 and 1970, he trained IRA Timișoara in the municipal championship.

== Death ==
Beke died on 5 March 1994 in Timișoara, Romania at age 82.

== Honours ==
=== Player ===
Ripensia Timișoara

- Divizia A: 1932–33, 1934–35, 1935–36, 1937–38, runner-up 1933–34, 1938–39
- Cupa României: 1933–34, 1935–36, runner-up 1934–35, 1936–37

CFR Turnu Severin

- Cupa României: 1942–43

Kolozsvári VSC

- Magyar Kupa runner-up: 1943–44

Romania

- Balkan Cup: 1936

=== Manager ===
CFR Turnu Severin

- Cupa României: 1942–43
