= List of Romania national football team captains =

The Romania national football team represents the nation of Romania in international association football. It is fielded by the Romanian Football Federation (FRF) and competes as a member of Union of European Football Associations (UEFA), which encompasses the countries of Europe. The team played its first official international match on 8 June 1922 against Yugoslavia. Since its first competitive match, 802 players have made at least one international appearance for the team. Of them, 89 have served as captain of the national team. This list contains football players who have served as captain of the Romania national team and is listed according to their number of matches captained.

== Captains ==
Appearances and matches captained are composed of FIFA World Cup, UEFA European Football Championship, and each competition's required qualification matches, as well as numerous international friendly tournaments and matches. Players are initially listed by number of matches captained. If there's an equal number of matches captained, then the player who captained the national team first is listed first. Statistics correct as of 25 September 2026.

Key
§	Still active for the national team
†	Captained the team at a major international tournament
GK	Goalkeeper
DF	Defender
MF	Midfielder
FW	Forward

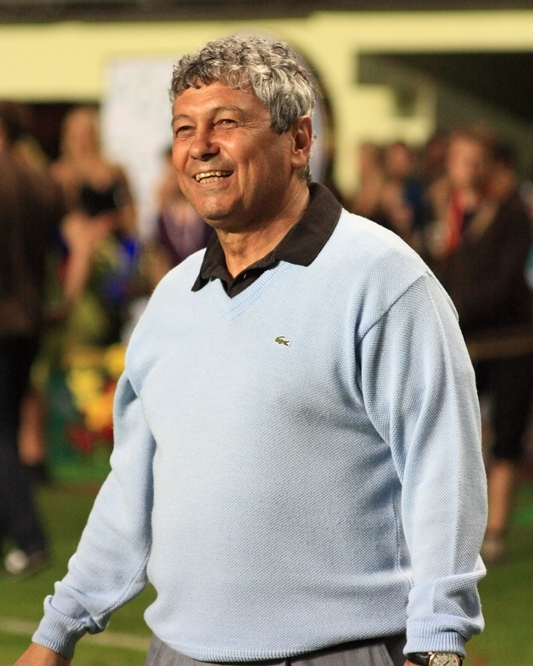
Mircea Lucescu captained Romania at 1970 FIFA World Cup

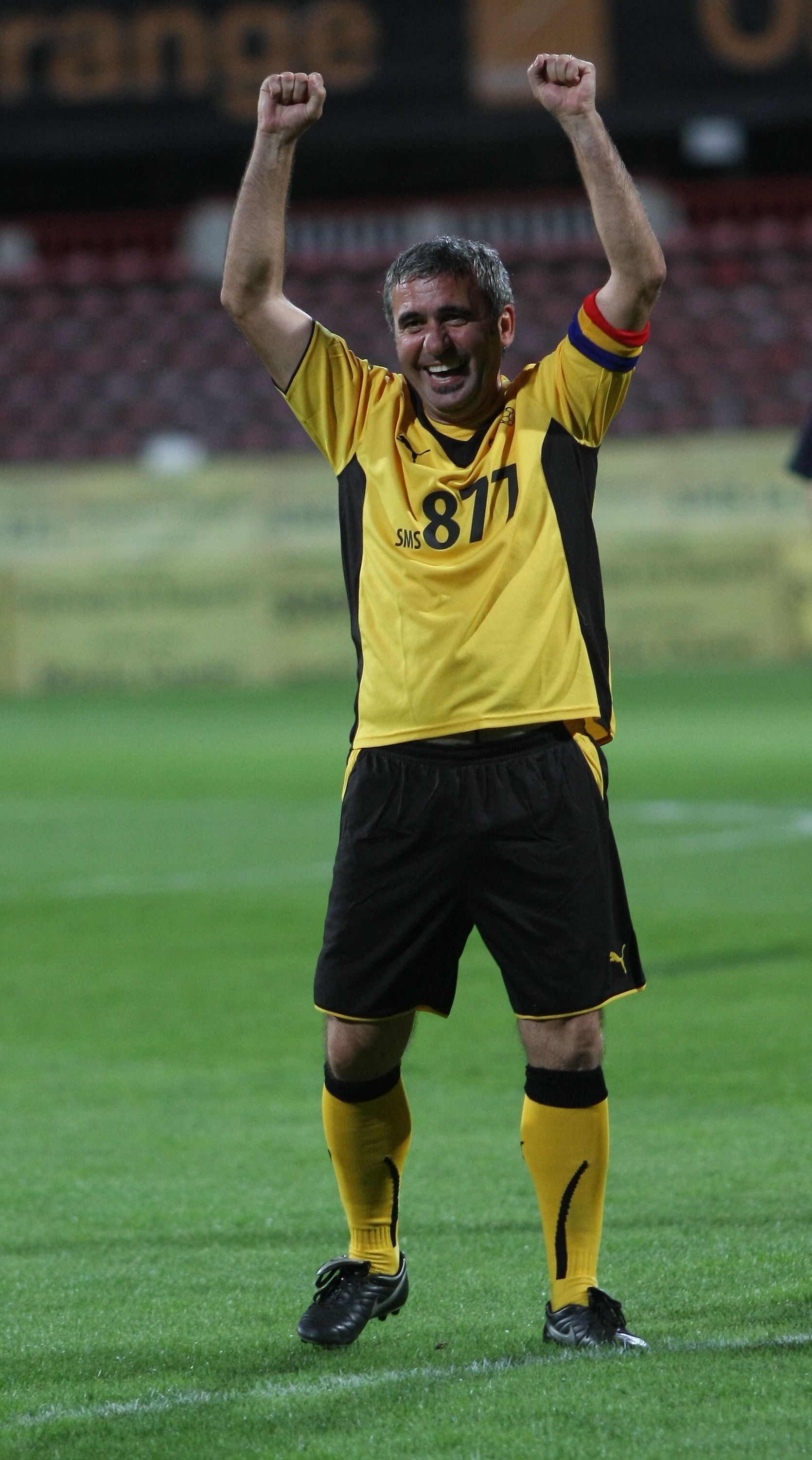
Gheorghe Hagi captained Romania for a record 65 times

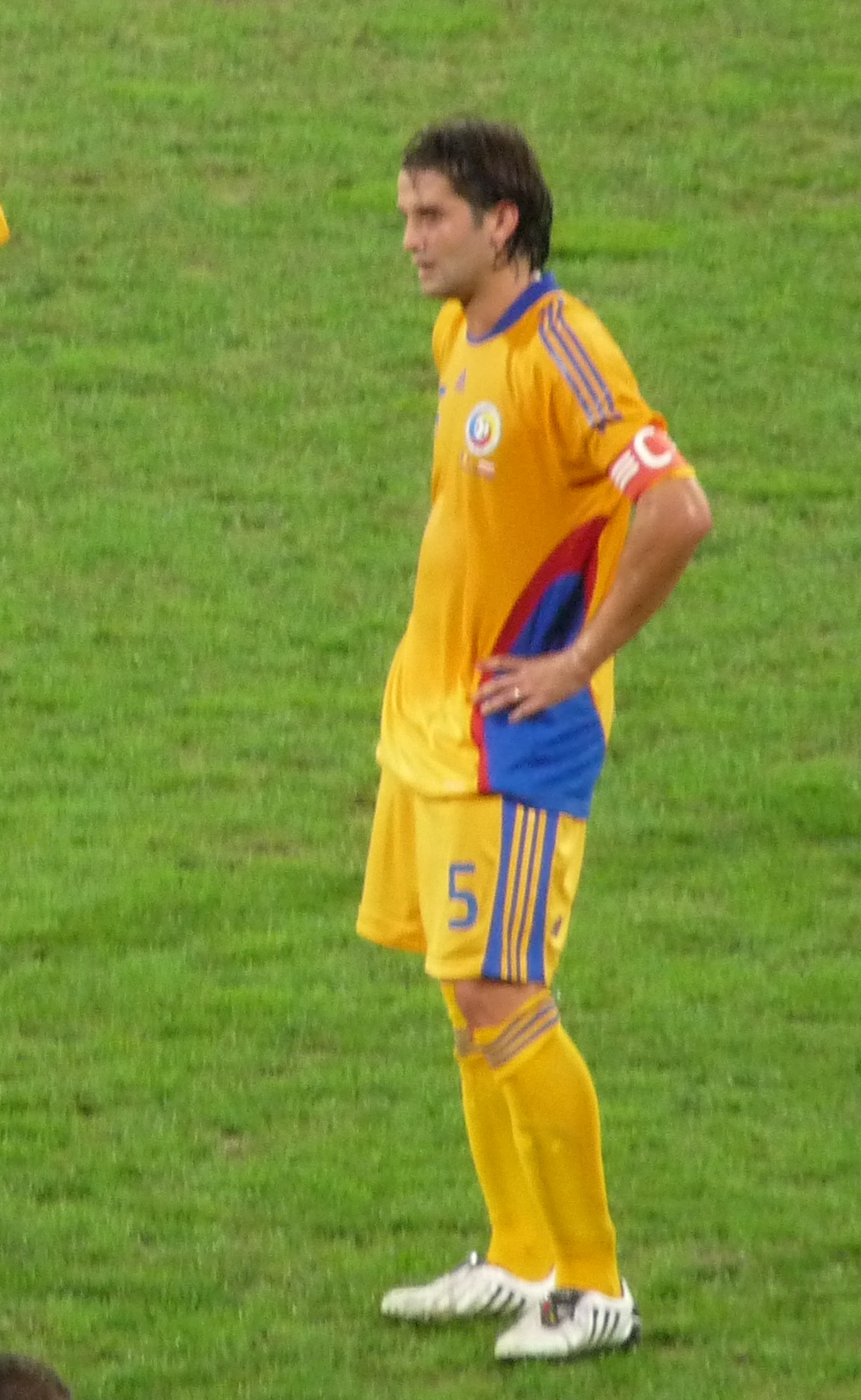
Cristian Chivu captained Romania at UEFA Euro 2008

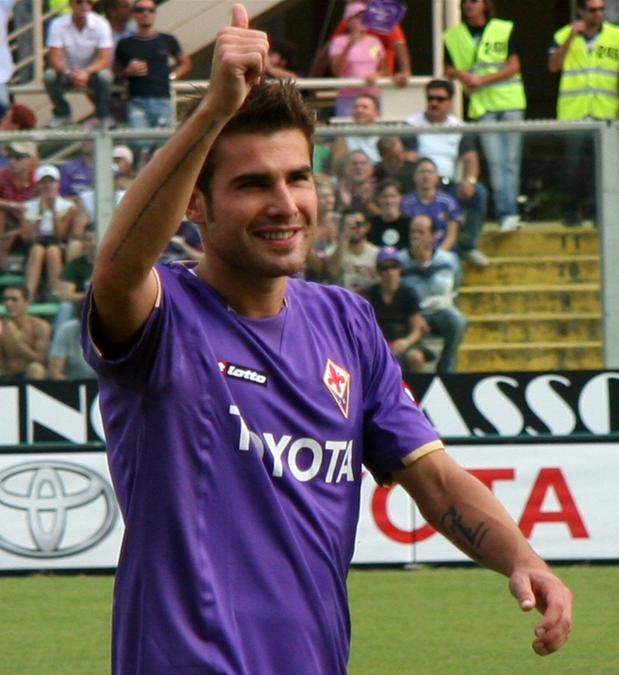
Adrian Mutu former Romania captain

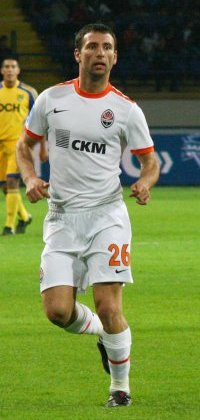
Răzvan Raț former Romania captain

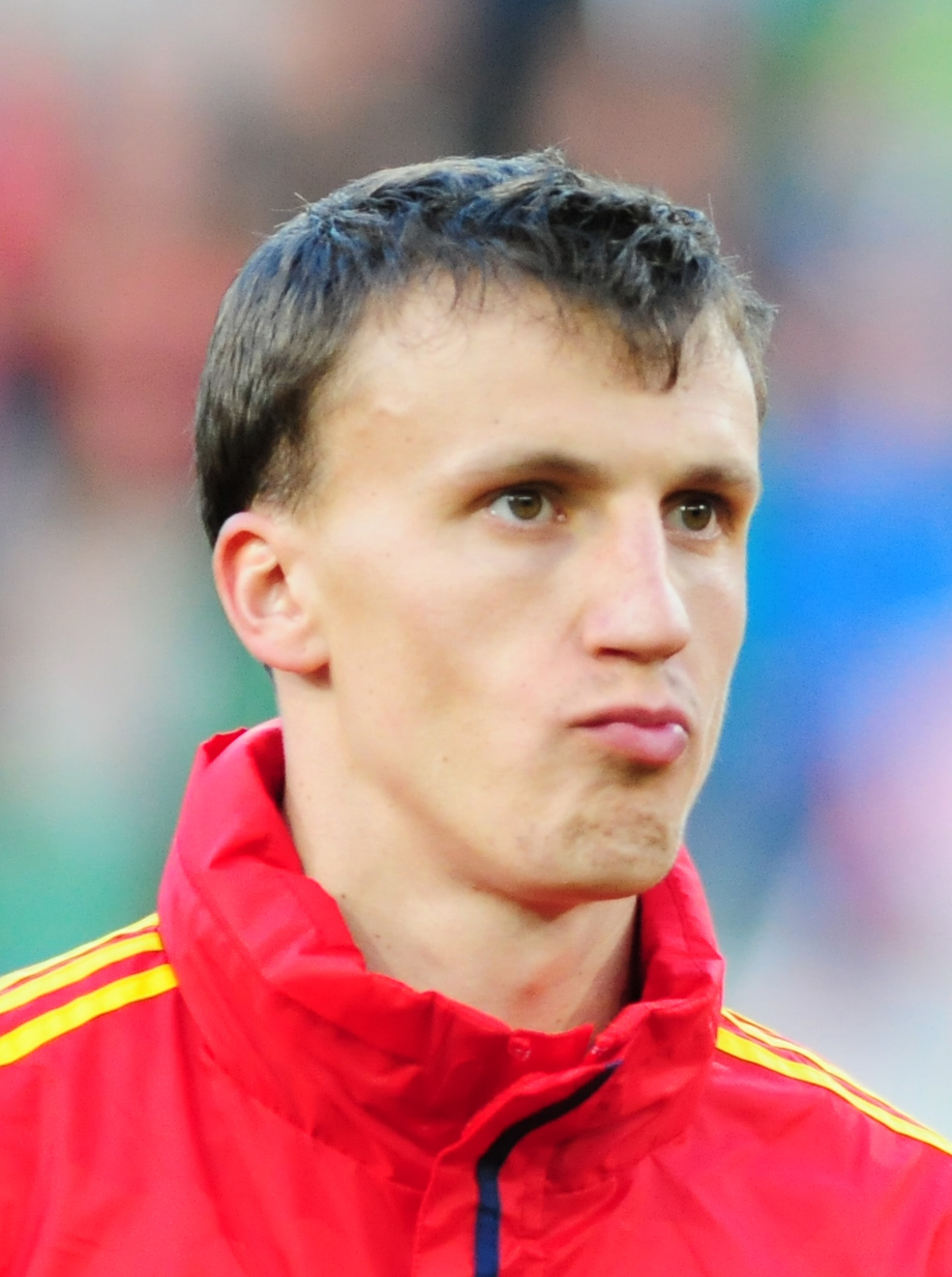
Vlad Chiricheș captained Romania at UEFA Euro 2016

List of Romania national team football players who have served as captain of the team
#	Name	Position	National team career	Caps as captain	Total caps	First captaincy
1	Gheorghe Hagi	MF	1983–2000^{†}	65	124	16 October 1985
2	Cristian Chivu	DF	1999–2011^{†}	50	75	28 March 2001
3	Vlad Chiricheș^{§}	DF	2011–^{†}	44	77	14 August 2013
4	Costică Ștefănescu	DF	1977–1985^{†}	43	64	13 May 1979
5	Cornel Dinu	DF	1968–1981	38	67	9 February 1969
6	Gheorghe Popescu	DF	1988–2003^{†}	34	114	20 April 1994
7	Nicolae Stanciu^{§}	MF	2016-^{†}	32	87	5 September 2021
8	Răzvan Raț	DF	2002–2016	28	113	16 November 2005
9	Ladislau Bölöni	MF	1975–1988	23	102	29 January 1983
10	Emerich Vogl	DF	1924–1934^{†}	22	29	7 May 1926
10	Mircea Lucescu	FW	1966–1979^{†}	22	64	15 January 1969
12	Silviu Lung	GK	1979–1993^{†}	21	76	19 October 1988
13	Gheorghe Albu	DF	1931–1938	19	42	25 March 1934
14	Adrian Mutu	FW	2000–2013	17	77	12 February 2003
15	Iosif Petschowski	MF	1945–1958	14	32	23 October 1958
16	Cornel Popa	DF	1958–1967	13	27	12 May 1963
17	Alexandru Apolzan	DF	1949–1960	11	22	28 June 1953
17	Cristian Săpunaru	DF	2008–2019	11	36	24 March 2018
19	Ion Dumitru	MF	1969–1980	10	50	12 May 1976
20	Aurel Guga	FW	1922–1928	9	12	8 June 1922
20	Anghel Iordănescu	FW	1971–1981	9	60	5 June 1976
20	Ilie Balaci	MF	1975–1987	9	67	12 May 1982
20	Ciprian Tătărușanu	GK	2009–2020	9	73	26 March 2019
24	Bazil Marian	MF	1941–1949	8	18	30 September 1945
25	Iuliu Bodola	FW	1945–1958	7	48	8 September 1937
25	Ion Mihăilescu	MF	1940–1950	7	15	20 June 1948
25	Marius Lăcătuș	FW	1984–1998	7	83	5 December 1990
25	Cosmin Contra	DF	1996–2010	7	73	24 April 2001
25	Ianis Hagi^{§}	MF	2018-	7	55	7 June 2024
30	Grațian Sepi	FW	1928–1937	6	23	10 May 1931
30	Lazăr Sfera	DF	1931–1941	6	14	29 November 1931
30	Ion Nunweiller	DF	1958–1967	6	26	21 September 1966
30	Dan Coe	DF	1963–1971	6	29	22 November 1967
30	Ștefan Sameș	DF	1973–1982	6	46	18 November 1979
35	Rudolf Wetzer	FW	1923–1932^{†}	5	17	14 July 1930
35	Adalbert Androvits	DF	1953–1955	5	7	29 May 1955
35	Emil Săndoi	DF	1987–1993	5	30	26 August 1992
35	Ionuț Lupescu	MF	1988–2000	5	73	7 June 1995
35	Dorinel Munteanu	MF	1991–2007	5	134	14 August 1996
35	Mirel Rădoi	DF	2000–2010	5	67	26 May 2006
35	Ciprian Marica	FW	2003–2014	5	72	8 June 2011
35	Dragoș Grigore	DF	2011–2020	5	39	4 September 2016
43	Nicolae Kovács	FW	1929–1938^{†}	4	36	4 July 1937
43	Nicolae Tătaru	FW	1954–1962	4	21	30 August 1959
43	Gheorghe Constantin	FW	1956–1967	4	25	25 November 1962
43	Răzvan Marin^{§}	MF	2016-	4	76	11 November 2020
47	Alexandru Negrescu	DF	1939–1946	3	8	8 October 1946
47	Nicolae Reuter	MF	1939–1947	3	14	25 May 1947
47	Costică Toma	GK	1953–1959	3	16	26 October 1958
47	Titus Ozon	FW	1952–1962	3	22	30 September 1962
47	Florin Cheran	DF	1971–1978	3	29	8 May 1977
47	Gino Iorgulescu	DF	1974–1986	3	47	28 February 1986
47	Mircea Rednic	DF	1981–1991	3	83	23 April 1986
47	Michael Klein	DF	1981–1991	3	89	28 August 1986
47	Ilie Dumitrescu	FW	1989–1998	3	61	22 September 1993
47	Dan Petrescu	DF	1989–2000	3	96	6 September 1997
47	Constantin Gâlcă	MF	1993–2005	3	68	16 August 2000
47	Daniel Prodan	DF	1993–2001	3	54	5 December 2000
47	Bogdan Lobonț	GK	1998–2018	3	86	21 November 2007
47	Gabriel Tamaș	DF	2003–2018	3	67	9 February 2011
61	Gheorghe Ciolac	FW	1928–1937	2	24	15 September 1929
61	Silviu Bindea	FW	1932–1942	2	27	12 October 1941
61	Dumitru Pavlovici	GK	1936–1942	2	15	23 August 1942
61	Nicolae Georgescu	MF	1955–1965	2	18	2 May 1965
61	Ion Barbu	DF	1966–1968	2	7	1 May 1968
61	Nicolae Dobrin	MF	1966–1978	2	46	5 June 1968
61	Mihai Mocanu	MF	1966–1971	2	31	27 October 1968
61	Marin Dragnea	MF	1984–1986	2	5	14 March 1986
69	Ferenc Rónay	FW	1922–1932	1	8	10 June 1923
69	Dumitru Vețianu	DF	1923	1	1	26 October 1923
69	Paul Schiller	FW	1922–1924	1	2	31 August 1924
69	Mircea Stroescu	GK	1923–1925	1	2	1 May 1925
69	Petre Steinbach	MF	1930–1935	1	18	28 June 1932
69	Ștefan Dobay	FW	1930–1939^{†}	1	41	9 June 1938
69	Iuliu Barátky	FW	1933–1940	1	20	14 July 1939
69	Silviu Ploeșteanu	FW	1937–1941	1	11	22 September 1940
69	Mircea David	GK	1936–1943	1	12	13 June 1943
69	Ion Lungu	FW	1949–1950	1	5	14 May 1950
69	Gheorghe Băcuț	MF	1945–1956	1	28	10 September 1956
69	Tiberiu Bone	MF	1951–1961	1	12	14 May 1961
69	Ion Ionescu	FW	1962–1969	1	24	4 January 1967
69	Nicolae Lupescu	DF	1964–1972	1	21	11 November 1970
69	Flavius Domide	FW	1968–1972	1	18	30 January 1972
69	Aristică Ghiță	GK	1969–1972	1	3	23 April 1972
69	Gheorghe Mulțescu	MF	1974–1983	1	15	7 September 1983
69	Ștefan Iovan	DF	1983–1990	1	34	17 May 1989
69	Laurențiu Roșu	MF	1998–2007	1	38	4 February 2000
69	Adrian Ilie	FW	1993–2005	1	55	24 March 2001
69	Ionel Ganea	FW	1998–2006	1	45	27 May 2004
69	Daniel Pancu	MF	2001–2005	1	27	8 September 2004
69	Bogdan Stelea	GK	1988–2005	1	91	17 November 2004
69	Adrian Iencsi	DF	2000–2006	1	30	28 February 2006
69	Gabriel Mureșan	MF	2007–2011	1	9	12 June 2011
69	Bănel Nicoliță	MF	2005–2014	1	37	10 August 2011
69	Dorin Goian	DF	2005–2014	1	60	15 November 2011
69	Marius Niculae	FW	2000–2013	1	44	27 January 2012
69	Andrei Burcă^{§}	DF	2019-	1	46	20 November 2022
69	Andrei Rațiu^{§}	DF	2021-	1	39	10 June 2025
69	Dennis Man^{§}	MF	2018-	1	46	18 November 2025
