= Gheorghe Ciolac =

Romanian footballer

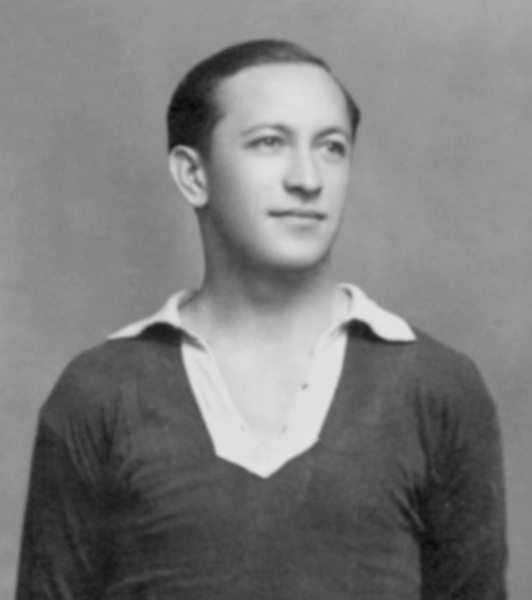

Personal information
- Date of birth: 10 August 1908
- Place of birth: Nagykomlós, Austria-Hungary
- Date of death: 13 April 1965 (aged 56)
- Place of death: Timișoara, Romania
- Position: Striker

Youth career
- 1922–1924: Politehnica Timișoara

Senior career*
Years	Team	Apps	(Gls)
1924–1930	Banatul Timișoara		
1930–1941	Ripensia Timișoara	116	(46)
Total		116	(46)

International career
1928–1937	Romania	24	(13)
- * Club domestic league appearances and goals

Gheorghe Ciolac (10 August 1908 – 13 April 1965) was a Romanian association football striker. He was a member of Romania's squad which competed in the 1934 FIFA World Cup, but did not play in any match.

== Club career ==
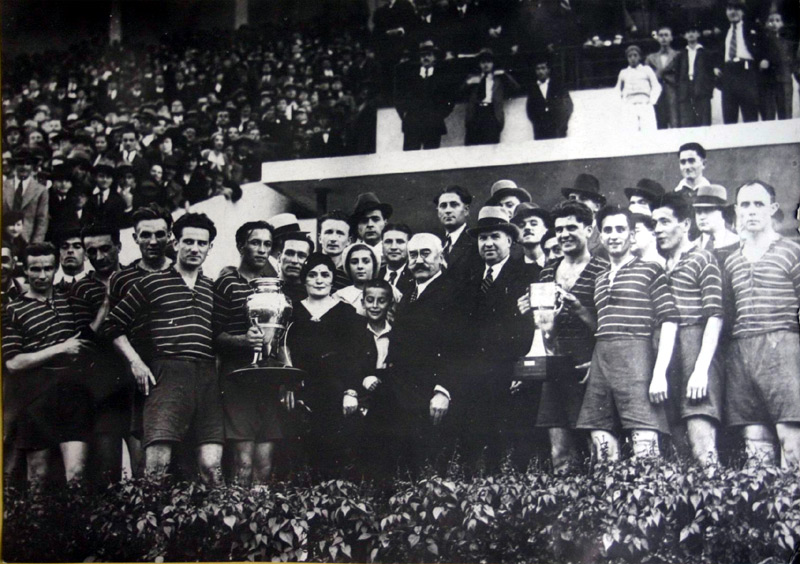
Gheorghe Ciolac (left) holding the 1933–34 Cupa României

Ciolac was born on 10 August 1908 in Nagykomlós, Austria-Hungary and began playing junior-level football in 1922 at Politehnica Timișoara. In 1924 he moved to neighboring club, Banatul with whom in the 1928–29 season he reached the semi-finals of the national league where they were defeated with 3–0 by România Cluj.

In 1930, Ciolac joined Ripensia Timișoara, winning the title in the 1932–33 season, coach Jenő Konrád using him in 13 games in which he scored three goals, including one in the final against Universitatea Cluj. In the following season he helped the team win the 1934 Cupa României final, playing in both victories over "U" Cluj, scoring once. In the 1934–35 season he won another title, coaches Josef Uridil and Rudolf Wetzer giving him 19 appearances in which he netted a personal record of 13 goals, also the team reached the Cupa României final where he played the entire match in the 6–5 loss to CFR București. Next season, Ciolac helped Ripensia win The Double, being given 21 appearances by coaches Wetzer and Konrád, scoring 11 times, and he netted a double in the 5–1 win over Unirea Tricolor București in the Cupa României final. In the following Cupa României edition, the team reached another final in which he played the full 90 minutes in the 5–1 loss to Rapid București. In the 1937–38 season, Ripensia won another title, but coach Sepp Pojar used him in only six matches in which he scored once. Afterwards he provided an assist for Ștefan Dobay's goal in Ripensia's 3–0 win over AC Milan in the first leg of the first round of the 1938 Mitropa Cup, helping the team get past the Italians. Ciolac made his last Divizia A appearance on 15 June 1941 in Ripensia's 4–1 away victory against Venus București.

== International career ==
Ciolac played 24 matches and scored 13 goals for Romania, making his debut on 6 May 1928 under coach Constantin Rădulescu in a 3–1 away loss to Yugoslavia in the friendly King Alexander's Cup. In his second match, Ciolac scored a hat-trick, as they defeated Bulgaria 3–0 in a friendly. In September 1929, he was for the first time captain of the national team, in another friendly match against Bulgaria that ended with a 3–2 away win. He played two games and netted one goal in a 2–1 win over Yugoslavia during the successful 1929–31 Balkan Cup. Ciolac won his second Balkan Cup in 1933 when he netted four goals, a hat-trick in a 7–0 win over Bulgaria and one goal in a 5–0 victory against Yugoslavia, being the top-scorer of the competition alongside teammate Ștefan Dobay.

Ciolac played in a 2–1 home win over Yugoslavia in the successful 1934 World Cup qualifiers. Afterwards he was selected by coaches Rădulescu and Josef Uridil to be part of the squad that went to the final tournament in Italy, but remained on the bench in the 2–1 defeat to eventual finalists, Czechoslovakia in the first round.

He won his third Balkan Cup in 1936, contributing with one goal in a 4–1 victory against Bulgaria, which was his last goal scored for the national team. Ciolac played his last match for The Tricolours on 18 April 1937, also being their captain in the 1–1 draw against Czechoslovakia.

=== International goals ===
Romania score listed first, score column indicates score after each Ciolac goal.

List of international goals scored by Gheorghe Ciolac
No.	Date	Venue	Opponent	Score	Result	Competition
1	21 April 1929	ONEF Stadium, Bucharest, Romania	Bulgaria	1–0	3–0	Friendly
2	21 April 1929	ONEF Stadium, Bucharest, Romania	Bulgaria	2–0	3–0	Friendly
3	21 April 1929	ONEF Stadium, Bucharest, Romania	Bulgaria	3–0	3–0	Friendly
4	10 October 1929	ONEF Stadium, Bucharest, Romania	Yugoslavia	2–0	2–1	1929–31 Balkan Cup
5	28 June 1932	SK Jugoslavija, Belgrade, Yugoslavia	Greece	1–0	3–0	1932 Balkan Cup
6	4 June 1933	ONEF Stadium, Bucharest, Romania	Bulgaria	3–0	7–0	1933 Balkan Cup
7	4 June 1933	ONEF Stadium, Bucharest, Romania	Bulgaria	4–0	7–0	1933 Balkan Cup
8	4 June 1933	ONEF Stadium, Bucharest, Romania	Bulgaria	6–0	7–0	1933 Balkan Cup
9	11 June 1933	ONEF Stadium, Bucharest, Romania	Yugoslavia	2–0	5–0	1933 Balkan Cup
10	14 October 1934	Czarnych, Lwow, Poland (now Lviv, Ukraine)	Poland	2–1	3–3	Friendly
11	27 December 1934	Leoforos Alexandras Stadium, Athens, Greece	Greece	2–0	2–2	1934–35 Balkan Cup
12	30 December 1934	Leoforos Alexandras Stadium, Athens, Greece	Bulgaria	3–0	3–2	1934–35 Balkan Cup
13	24 May 1936	ONEF Stadium, Bucharest, Romania	Bulgaria	3–1	4–1	1936 Balkan Cup

== Style of play ==
His Ripensia teammate, Rudolf Kotormány said about him:"I consider Ghiță Ciolac to be the greatest center forward our country has ever had. Ciolac was a great technician, he knew how to create scoring opportunities for himself and his teammates. He always passed the ball. Even if he had a shot lane, he would pass the ball to the one who was in the best position." Another Ripensia teammate, Ștefan Dobay said:"Among the center forwards I played with, first of all I have to mention Ghiță Ciolac, an admirable teammate and colleague. He was ready to pass the ball to the best-placed player. Ciolac even exaggerated in his altruism. He knew how to take direct crosses very well, which, when caught from the volley, were certain death for the goalkeeper."

== Death ==
Ciolac died on 13 April 1965 at age 56.

== Honours ==
=== Club ===
Ripensia Timișoara

- Divizia A: 1932–33, 1934–35, 1935–36, 1937–38, runner-up 1933–34, 1938–39
- Cupa României: 1933–34, 1935–36, runner-up 1934–35, 1936–37

=== International ===
Romania

- Balkan Cup: 1929–31, 1933, 1936

=== Individual ===
- Balkan Cup top-scorer: 1933
