= 1934 Cupa României final =

- Event: 1933–34 Cupa României
Ripensia Timișoara	Universitatea Cluj
5	0
- Ripensia Timișoara won the replay 5–0
Ripensia Timișoara	Universitatea Cluj
3	2
- Date: 8 September 1934
- Venue: Electrica, Timișoara
- Attendance: 3,000

Replay
Ripensia Timișoara	Universitatea Cluj
5	0
- Date: 30 September 1934
- Venue: ONEF, Bucharest
- Referee: Denis Xifando (Bucharest)
- Attendance: 10,000

The 1934 Cupa României final was the first final of Romania's most prestigious football cup competition. It was disputed between Ripensia Timișoara and Universitatea Cluj, and was initially played on 8 September 1934 in Timișoara.

After losing 3-2, Universitatea Cluj contested the decision to stage the game in the opponent's hometown, and insisted the final to be replayed on a neutral venue. The objection was accepted, and a replay took place on 30 September 1934 in Bucharest. Ripensia won again, this time by a five goals margin, and became the first winners of the Romanian Cup.

Both teams played in 1–2–3–5 formula, 1 GK, 2 DF, 3 MF and 5 FW.

The first game played at Timișoara on 8 September 1934 was contested by Universitatea Cluj requiring the match to be played at a neutral stadium.

The second game replayed at Bucharest on 30 September 1934, was won categorically by Ripensia Timișoara by five goals to nil.

This final remains in history for the circumstances of being played twice, both wins for the Timișoara team.

== Match details ==
8 September 1934

Ripensia Timișoara	3–2	Universitatea Cluj
Schwartz 5'; Dobay 29'; Ciolac 85'	Report	Ploeşteanu 18'; Surlaşiu 64'

Electrica, Timișoara
Attendance: 3,000

Ripensia Timișoara	Universitatea Cluj

GK	1	(Romania) William Zombory
DF	2	(Romania) Rudolf Bürger
DF	3	(Romania) Francisc Agner
MF	4	(Romania) Vasile Deheleanu
MF	5	(Romania) Rudolf Kotormany
MF	6	(Romania) Eugen Lakatos
FW	7	(Romania) Silviu Bindea
FW	8	(Romania) Zoltan Beke
FW	9	(Romania) Gheorghe Ciolac
FW	10	(Romania) Alexandru Schwartz
FW	11	(Romania) Ştefan Dobay
Manager:
(Austria) Josef Uridil

GK	1	(Romania) Andrei Sepci
DF	2	(Romania) Grigore Iancovici
DF	3	(Romania) Lazăr Sfera
MF	4	(Romania) Ioan Ghilezan
MF	5	(Romania) Vasile Gain
MF	6	(Romania) Ioan Doboşan
FW	7	(Romania) Cornel Orza
FW	8	(Romania) Silviu Ploeşteanu
FW	9	(Romania) Pompei Ionaş
FW	10	(Romania) Victor Surlaşiu
FW	11	(Romania) Andrei Baciu
Manager:
(Hungary) Adalbert Molnar

== Replay ==
30 September 1934
15:30 EET

Ripensia Timișoara	5–0	Universitatea Cluj
Dobay 18' 20'; Bindea 41' 85'; Schwartz 48'	Report

ONEF, Bucharest
Attendance: 10,000
Referee: Denis Xifando (Bucharest)

Ripensia Timișoara	Universitatea Cluj

GK	1	(Romania) William Zombory
DF	2	(Romania) Rudolf Bürger
DF	3	(Romania) Balázs Hoksary
MF	4	(Romania) Vasile Deheleanu
MF	5	(Romania) Rudolf Kotormany
MF	6	(Romania) Adalbert Hrehuss
FW	7	(Romania) Silviu Bindea
FW	8	(Romania) Cornel Lazăr
FW	9	(Romania) Gheorghe Ciolac
FW	10	(Romania) Alexandru Schwartz
FW	11	(Romania) Ştefan Dobay
Manager:
(Austria) Josef Uridil

GK	1	(Romania) Andrei Sepci
DF	2	(Romania) Victor Vidrăşan
DF	3	(Romania) Grigore Iancovici
MF	4	(Romania) Marius Ştefănescu
MF	5	(Romania) Vasile Gain
MF	6	(Romania) Emil Borgia
FW	7	(Romania) Cornel Orza
FW	8	(Romania) Silviu Ploeşteanu
FW	9	(Romania) Pompei Ionaş
FW	10	(Romania) Victor Surlaşiu
FW	11	(Romania) Andrei Baciu
Manager:
(Hungary) Adalbert Molnar

== See also ==
- List of Cupa României finals
