= 1934–35 Divizia A =

23rd season of top-tier football league in Romania

Divizia A
- Season: 1934–35
- Champions: Ripensia Timişoara
- Top goalscorer: Ștefan Dobay (24)

The 1934–35 Divizia A was the twenty-third season of Divizia A, the top-level football league of Romania. Venus București were the defending champions.

== Teams ==
Location of teams in 1934-35 Divizia A

== League table ==
Pos	Team	Pld	W	D	L	GF	GA	GD	Pts	Qualification or relegation
1	Ripensia Timișoara (C)	22	14	4	4	66	34	+32	32	Champions of Romania
2	CA Oradea	22	14	1	7	50	28	+22	29	
3	Venus București	22	14	1	7	57	38	+19	29	
4	Universitatea Cluj	22	12	1	9	36	34	+2	25	
5	Chinezul Timișoara	22	9	5	8	58	57	+1	23	
6	România Cluj	22	9	5	8	41	41	0	23	
7	Crișana Oradea	22	8	6	8	46	50	−4	22	
8	Gloria Arad	22	7	7	8	45	57	−12	21	
9	Unirea Tricolor București	22	6	7	9	49	54	−5	19	
10	CFR București	22	8	1	13	39	51	−12	17	
11	Juventus București	22	6	4	12	32	46	−14	16	
12	AMEF Arad (O)	22	2	4	16	24	53	−29	8	Qualification to relegation play-offs

Source: LT
Rules for classification: 1) points; 2) goal average; 3) number of goals scored
(C) Champions; (O) Play-off winners

=== Results ===
Home \ Away	AME	CAO	CFR	CHI	CRI	GLA	JUV	RIP	ROM	UTB	UCJ	VEN
AMEF Arad	—	1–2	1–0	1–3	0–1	0–2	2–0	2–2	1–2	2–4	1–2	0–4
CA Oradea	3–0	—	4–2	3–1	3–1	7–1	4–0	2–2	2–1	2–3	1–0	3–1
CFR București	3–0	1–0	—	3–2	3–4	4–5	4–3	2–2	1–3	2–1	1–2	0–1
Chinezul Timișoara	4–2	3–2	2–3	—	0–0	5–3	1–1	3–2	1–1	3–1	2–3	4–2
Crișana Oradea	1–1	1–2	5–3	3–5	—	2–2	2–0	2–2	2–2	3–2	4–2	4–1
Gloria Arad	1–1	2–1	3–2	6–1	4–2	—	1–2	3–6	2–2	2–2	1–3	1–1
Juventus București	3–1	1–0	1–2	2–2	5–3	2–2	—	0–3	3–2	1–4	1–0	1–3
Ripensia Timișoara	4–3	3–1	2–0	5–6	5–2	3–0	1–0	—	5–1	5–0	5–1	0–1
România Cluj	4–1	1–4	2–1	3–1	2–0	0–3	1–0	1–2	—	4–4	1–0	4–5
Unirea Tricolor București	3–3	1–2	4–1	4–4	1–2	1–1	3–3	2–3	2–2	—	4–3	1–0
Universitatea Cluj	5–0	0–2	2–1	2–1	0–0	3–0	2–1	1–0	0–2	3–0	—	2–1
Venus București	3–1	2–0	2–3	5–4	5–2	7–0	3–2	1–4	1–0	3–2	5–0	—

Source: LT
Legend: Blue = home team win; Yellow = draw; Red = away team win.

== Promotion / relegation play-off ==
Team 1	Agg.	Team 2	1st leg	2nd leg
AMEF Arad	2–0	Jiul Petroşani	2–0	0–0

== Top goalscorers ==
Rank	Player	Club	Goals
1	Ștefan Dobay	Ripensia Timişoara	24
2	Mihai Glasz	Chinezul Timișoara	18
3	Iuliu Bodola	CA Oradea	17
4	Valeriu Niculescu	Unirea Tricolor București	15
5	Gheorghe Ciolac	Ripensia Timişoara	13
5	Eugen Lakatos	Crișana Oradea	13

== Champion squad ==
Ripensia Timişoara

Goalkeepers: Dumitru Pavlovici (15 / 0); Vilmos Zombori (7 / 1).
Defenders: Rudolf Bürger (17 / 0); Balázs Hoksary (21 / 0); Gustav Nemeth (4 / 0); Francisc Agner (8 / 0).
Midfielders: Vasile Deheleanu (21 / 3); Rudolf Kotormány (17 / 1); Eugen Lakatos (19 / 0); Iosif Slivăț (1 / 0); Adalbert Hrehuss (1 / 0).
Forwards: Silviu Bindea (20 / 6); Zoltan Beke (14 / 3); Gheorghe Ciolac (19 / 13); Sándor Schwartz (22 / 10); Ștefan Dobay (22 / 24); Cornel Lazăr (14 /5); Gall (1-0).
(league appearances and goals listed in brackets)

Manager: Josef Uridil (Austria) / Rudolf Wetzer.

== See also ==
- 1934–35 Divizia B
