= SpVg Bönen =

German football club

- Full name: Sportvereinigung Bönen 1984 e.V.
- Founded: 1984
- League: Kreiliga A (IX)
- 2015–16: 2nd
Home colours	Away colours

SpVg Bönen is a German association football club from Altenbögge in Bönen. The team is the successor to Verein für Leibesübungen Altenbögge which was established 17 May 1928 and played as a first division side during World War II. Almost all the players were workers from the Königsborn III/IV colliery. VfL played attractive attacking football which soon earned them the nickname "Rote Husaren" (the Red Hussars) and a place in second division play by 1937.

== History ==
German football was reorganized into 16 top flight regional divisions in 1933, and VfL first took part in qualification play for the Gauliga Westfalen in 1939. They failed in their initial attempt to advance, but won promotion the next year. The Altenbögge side developed into a strong one after the arrival in 1941 of coach Josef Uridil, a former star striker in Austrian football. The team finished second in their division in the 1942–43 and 1943–44 seasons behind the dominant club of the era, FC Schalke 04. As the war turned against Germany teams were often merged into wartime sides known as Kriegsspielgemeinschaft to accommodate manpower shortages. VfL began the 1944–45 season as part of KSG Altenbögge/Kaiserau alongside SuS Kaiserau but the division collapsed after they had played just two matches.

Following the war in July 1945 the team merged with Sportverein 1936 Bönen to form Rot-Weiß Bönen. VfL resumed its independence in February 1946 and what was left of Rot-Weiß became Sportgemeinde Grün-Weiß Bönen. Between 1947 and 1962 Altenbögge was part of the Amateurliga Westfalen (III).

In 1984 VfL and SG were reunited and joined newcomer Eintracht 1980 Bönen to create the present day club SpVg 1984 Bönen. The club played in the Bezirksliga Westfalen 7 but was relegated back to the Kreisliga A in 2015.
