= 1937–38 Divizia A =

26th season of top-tier football league in Romania

Divizia A
- Season: 1937–38
- Champions: Ripensia Timişoara
- Matches: 180
- Goals: 699 (3.88 per match)
- Top goalscorer: Ludovic Thierjung (22)
- Biggest home win: Chinezul 7–0 Petroșani; Chinezul 7–0 Brăila; Gloria 9–2 Vulturii Textila; Ripensia 8–1 Dragoș Vodă; Venus 7–0 CFR Brașov
- Biggest away win: Dragoș Vodă 0–6 Venus
- Highest scoring: Venus 9–3 U Cluj

The 1937–38 Divizia A was the twenty-sixth season of Divizia A, the top-level football league of Romania.

== Group 1 ==
=== League table ===
Pos	Team	Pld	W	D	L	GF	GA	GD	Pts	Qualification or relegation
1	Rapid București (A)	18	12	2	4	41	16	+25	26	Advances to the final
2	AMEFA Arad	18	12	2	4	48	25	+23	26	
3	Victoria Cluj	18	10	3	5	40	25	+15	23	
4	Chinezul Timișoara	18	9	2	7	57	37	+20	20	
5	Phoenix Baia Mare	18	9	2	7	30	30	0	20	
6	Unirea Tricolor București (R)	18	6	6	6	32	36	−4	18	Relegation to Divizia B
7	CA Oradea (R)	18	5	4	9	29	36	−7	14	Relegation to Divizia B
8	Jiul Petroșani (R)	18	5	4	9	25	43	−18	14	Relegation to Divizia B
9	Dacia Unirea Brăila (R)	18	4	2	12	21	48	−27	10	Relegation to Divizia B
10	Olimpia CFR Satu Mare (R)	18	2	5	11	13	40	−27	9	Relegation to Divizia B

Source: LT
Rules for classification: 1) points; 2) goal difference; 3) number of goals scored
(A) Advance to a further round; (R) Relegated

=== Results ===
Home \ Away	AME	CAO	CHI	DUB	JIU	OLI	PHO	RAP	UTB	VCL
AMEF Arad	—	2–0	6–1	6–0	4–2	3–0	4–1	2–1	5–1	2–1
CA Oradea	2–1	—	1–4	4–0	3–1	5–0	1–4	1–2	0–0	1–2
Chinezul Timișoara	1–2	7–3	—	7–0	7–0	6–0	1–1	1–4	6–1	1–3
Dacia Unirea Brăila	4–2	1–2	2–6	—	1–0	1–1	2–3	1–0	1–2	2–2
Jiul Petroșani	1–2	3–3	2–2	3–1	—	1–0	3–1	0–1	4–2	2–1
Olimpia CFR Satu Mare	1–1	1–1	1–2	0–3	0–0	—	4–0	0–0	0–4	4–3
Phoenix Baia Mare	4–2	1–0	0–2	2–1	4–0	3–1	—	2–1	2–0	1–1
Rapid București	3–1	3–1	6–0	3–0	2–0	3–0	1–0	—	1–1	3–5
Unirea Tricolor București	2–2	1–1	3–2	3–1	3–3	2–0	3–0	1–4	—	1–2
Victoria Cluj	0–1	3–0	2–1	2–0	6–0	2–0	3–1	0–3	2–2	—

Source: LT
Legend: Blue = home team win; Yellow = draw; Red = away team win.
For upcoming matches, an "a" indicates there is an article about the rivalry between the two participants.

== Group 2 ==
=== League table ===
Pos	Team	Pld	W	D	L	GF	GA	GD	Pts	Qualification or relegation
1	Ripensia Timișoara (C)	18	15	0	3	63	25	+38	30	Advances to the final
2	Venus București	18	13	3	2	64	16	+48	29	
3	Gloria Arad	18	9	6	3	41	24	+17	24	
4	Juventus București	18	7	5	6	30	31	−1	19	
5	Sportul Studenţesc București	18	7	4	7	33	34	−1	18	
6	Universitatea Cluj (R)	18	7	2	9	33	50	−17	16	Relegation to Divizia B
7	Vulturii Textila Lugoj (R)	18	6	2	10	24	41	−17	14	Relegation to Divizia B
8	Crișana Oradea (R)	18	5	1	12	23	40	−17	11	Relegation to Divizia B
9	CFR Brașov (R)	18	4	3	11	26	45	−19	11	Relegation to Divizia B
10	Dragoș Vodă Cernăuți (R)	18	4	0	14	26	57	−31	8	Relegation to Divizia B

Source: LT
Rules for classification: 1) points; 2) goal difference; 3) number of goals scored
(C) Champions; (R) Relegated

=== Results ===
Home \ Away	CFB	CRI	DRA	GLA	JUV	RIP	SPO	UCJ	VEN	VUL
CFR Brașov	—	5–0	3–0	1–5	0–1	2–6	1–1	2–2	1–3	0–1
Crișana Oradea	3–1	—	1–0	1–2	1–1	0–2	2–1	4–1	2–3	2–4
Dragoș Vodă Cernăuți	3–4	5–3	—	1–3	2–3	1–3	3–2	2–0	0–6	2–0
Gloria Arad	1–1	1–0	2–0	—	1–1	4–1	3–0	5–0	1–1	9–2
Juventus București	2–0	2–1	4–1	5–1	—	0–2	1–1	4–1	0–2	2–2
Ripensia Timișoara	3–1	3–0	8–1	4–0	5–0	—	3–0	7–1	1–6	3–1
Sportul Studenţesc București	4–2	2–1	3–2	3–0	1–1	3–4	—	4–1	0–0	3–1
Universitatea Cluj	3–1	0–1	3–0	1–1	6–2	2–5	4–1	—	1–0	3–2
Venus București	7–0	5–0	7–2	1–1	3–1	0–1	4–1	9–3	—	5–1
Vulturii Textila Lugoj	0–1	2–1	2–1	1–1	1–0	3–2	1–3	0–1	0–2	—

Source: LT
Legend: Blue = home team win; Yellow = draw; Red = away team win.
For upcoming matches, an "a" indicates there is an article about the rivalry between the two participants.

== Final ==
Team 1	Agg.	Team 2	1st leg	2nd leg
Rapid București	0–4	Ripensia Timişoara	0–2	0–2

== Top goalscorers ==
Rank	Player	Club	Goals
1	Ludovic Thierjung	Chinezul Timișoara	22
2	Silviu Bindea	Ripensia Timişoara	21
2	Fritz	Gloria Arad	21
4	Iuliu Bodola	Venus București	18
4	Kostas Humis	Venus București	18
4	Adalbert Marksteiner	Ripensia Timişoara	18

== Champion squad ==
Ripensia Timişoara

Goalkeepers: Dumitru Pavlovici (19 / 0); Vilmos Zombori (1 / 0).
Defenders: Rudolf Bürger (17 / 0); Francisc Agner (7 / 0); Vasile Chiroiu (14 / 0); Carol Regdom (2 / 0).
Midfielders: Tibor Nagy (16 / 0); Rudolf Kotormány (15 / 2); Gal (15 / 0); Vasile Deheleanu (2 / 0); Schaff (1 / 0).
Forwards: Silviu Bindea (18 / 21); Sándor Schwartz (9 / 3); Grațian Sepi (10 / 7); Adalbert Marksteiner (17 / 18); Cornel Lazăr (16 / 2); Ștefan Dobay (20 / 8); Zoltan Beke (7 / 1); Gheorghe Ciolac (6 / 1); Ioan Oprean (8 / 3);.
(league appearances and goals listed in brackets)

Manager: Sepp Pojar (Austria) .
