= Phoenix Baia Mare =

Defunct Romanian football club from Baia Mare

- Full name: Phoenix Baia Mare
- Short name: Phoenix
- Founded: 1932
- Dissolved: 1948 (original club; merged with Minaur); 2003 (Cuprom/Phoenix team)
- Ground: Phoenix Stadium

Phoenix Baia Mare was a Romanian works football club based in Baia Mare, Maramureș County. The original Phoenix was founded in 1932 as the football team associated with the city's chemical-products works. It merged with Minaur Baia Mare in 1948, with the resulting club becoming CSM Baia Mare. The Phoenix name returned in 1992, when the factory-backed Cuprom Baia Mare team was renamed Phoenix. This later side remained active until 2003.

The original club spent three seasons in Romania's top flight between 1937 and 1940, achieving its best result with a fifth-place finish in 1937–38.

== History ==
=== Foundation and interwar period ===
Phoenix was established in 1932 and entered the local district championship in the 1932–33 season. Its own ground, the Phoenix Stadium, was officially opened on 6 August 1933.

The club made an early impact in the Cupa României. In the inaugural 1933–34 edition, Phoenix defeated Mureșul Târgu Mureș and Tricolor Ploiești before losing 0–1 to AMEF Arad in the quarter-finals. It reached the same stage again in 1934–35, when CFR București eliminated the team 4–2.

Phoenix was one of the clubs admitted to the newly created Divizia B in 1934. It won its series in each of the first three seasons of the competition. Jiul Petroșani won the promotion competition in 1934–35 and ILSA Timișoara did so a year later, leaving Phoenix in the second tier on both occasions. After another series title in 1936–37, Phoenix was promoted to Divizia A.

In its first top-flight campaign, 1937–38, Phoenix finished fifth in its group. The club changed its name to FC Carpați Baia Mare in 1938 and finished seventh in each of the following two Divizia A seasons.

Following the territorial changes of 1940, the team entered the Hungarian football system under the name Nagybányai SE. It competed at second-tier level during the wartime period, including runner-up finishes in its group in 1942–43 and 1943–44.

=== Post-war years and merger ===
After World War II, the club returned to the Phoenix name. It won its 1947–48 Divizia B series after a run that included eleven consecutive victories, but failed to secure promotion to the first division in the subsequent play-off.

Later in 1948, Phoenix merged with Minaur Baia Mare. The new club competed as CSM Baia Mare and became part of the sporting lineage later associated with FC Baia Mare. The merger brought the history of the original Phoenix as a separate football club to an end.

=== Cuprom and the return of Phoenix ===
A separate works team backed by Baia Mare's non-ferrous metals industry later competed under the name Cuprom Baia Mare. From 1980 to 1992, Cuprom was a regular presence in Divizia C, apart from a brief spell at county level.

Cuprom won its Divizia C series in 1991–92. Before the following season, the club adopted the historic Phoenix Baia Mare name. Phoenix then finished first in Serie IV of the 1992–93 Divizia C and was promoted to Divizia B.

The club finished 16th in its Divizia B series in 1993–94, but remained in the division after defeating Metalul Bocșa 2–1 in a relegation play-off. A year later, Phoenix finished 17th and was relegated to Divizia C.

Phoenix subsequently spent six seasons in Divizia C. During the 2000–01 season, the club withdrew from the championship and dropped to the county leagues. It continued there for another two seasons before ceasing activity in 2003.

== Ground ==
Phoenix's traditional home was the Phoenix Stadium, a works ground built for the sporting activities of the industrial complex with which the club was associated. The venue was inaugurated on 6 August 1933, shortly after the football team had begun competing in the local championship. A later Romanian sports encyclopedia records the ground on Strada Horea and describes the complex as comprising a football pitch, a stand with approximately 1,000 places, changing rooms and a sauna.

The ground remained closely associated with the factory's football activity for decades. After the original Phoenix merged with Minaur Baia Mare in 1948, football continued to be played at the venue, while the factory later maintained its own team under several names. When the traditional Phoenix name was restored in 1992, replacing Cuprom Baia Mare, the stadium again served as the home of the factory side during its return to the national divisions. Phoenix spent two seasons in Divizia B between 1993 and 1995 and subsequently competed in Divizia C. After the team dropped to county level in 2001 and eventually ceased activity in 2003, the ground gradually lost its role as a football venue.

The stadium nevertheless remained in sporting use for a number of years. From the early 2000s it was used predominantly for rugby union, both by senior and youth teams. In May 2012, Phoenix Stadium hosted a Romanian top-flight match between Știința CSM Baia Mare and RCM Universitatea Timișoara, attended by approximately 1,500 spectators. Youth rugby was still being played there in April 2018, when the Romanian Rugby Federation listed a match between CSS 2 Baia Mare and CSS Bârlad at Stadion Phoenix.

By that time, however, the future of the ground had become uncertain. The sports base belonged to Cuprom SA, and in 2018, while the company was in insolvency proceedings, the property was put up for public auction by its judicial liquidator. The former sporting site was subsequently included in a wider real-estate redevelopment of the Clubul Campionilor–Phoenix area. By the 2020s, local reports were referring to the location as the former Phoenix Stadium, rather than as an active sports ground. As a result, the historic Phoenix ground no longer survives as a functioning football stadium.

Its name has nevertheless remained part of the local geography. A public-transport stop on Strada Luminișului continues to bear the name Stadion Phoenix; the designation appears both in municipal records and in the city's current public-transport planning documents.

== Honours ==
Divizia A

- Best finish: 5th – 1937–38

Divizia B

- Series winners (4): 1934–35, 1935–36, 1936–37, 1947–48

Divizia C

- Series winners (2): 1991–92, 1992–93

Cupa României

- Quarter-finals (2): 1933–34, 1934–35

== League history ==
Season	Tier	Division	Place	Notes
2001–03	4	Liga IV	—	Positions unverified; dissolved in 2003
2000–01	3	Divizia C	Withdrawn	Results annulled; dropped to county league
1999–2000	3	Divizia C	8th	
1998–99	3	Divizia C	10th	
1997–98	3	Divizia C	11th	
1996–97	3	Divizia C	8th	
1995–96	3	Divizia C	8th	
1994–95	2	Divizia B (Seria II)	17th (R)	Relegated
1993–94	2	Divizia B (Seria II)	16th	Won relegation play-off
1992–93	3	Divizia C (Seria IV)	1st (C, P)	Renamed Phoenix; promoted
1991–92	3	Divizia C (Seria XII)	1st (C)	As Cuprom; remained at third tier
1990–91	3	Divizia C	6th	As Cuprom
1989–90	3	Divizia C	10th	As Cuprom
1988–89	3	Divizia C	10th	As Cuprom
1987–88	3	Divizia C	14th	As Cuprom
1986–87	4	Liga IV	1st (C, P)	As Cuprom; promoted
1985–86	3	Divizia C (Seria X)	16th (R)	As Cuprom; 3-point penalty
1984–85	3	Divizia C	10th	As Cuprom
1983–84	3	Divizia C	14th	As Cuprom
1982–83	3	Divizia C	11th	As Cuprom
1981–82	3	Divizia C	8th	As Cuprom
1980–81	3	Divizia C	8th	As Cuprom
1979–80	3	Divizia C	9th	As Cuprom
1978–79	3	Divizia C	4th	As Cuprom
1977–78	3	Divizia C	9th	As Cuprom

Season	Tier	Division	Place	Notes
1976–77	3	Divizia C	12th	As Cuprom
1975–76	3	Divizia C	4th	As Cuprom
1974–75	3	Divizia C	14th	As Cuprom
1973–74	3	Divizia C	11th	As Topitorul
1972–73	3	Divizia C	4th	As Topitorul
1971–72	3	Divizia C	6th	Chimistul renamed Topitorul
1970–71	3	Divizia C	15th	As Chimistul
1969–70	3	Divizia C (Seria VII)	8th	As Chimistul
1968–69	4	Liga IV	1st (C, P)	As Chimistul; promoted
1948–68	—	—	—	Phoenix name inactive
1947–48	2	Divizia B (Seria IV)	1st (C)	Merged with Minaur
1946–47	2	Divizia B (Seria III)	3rd	
1945–46	—	Baia Mare District Championship	—	Won qualifier for Divizia B
1944–45	No completed regular league season			
1943–44	2	Nemzeti Bajnokság II (Eastern Group)	2nd	As Nagybányai SE; season interrupted
1942–43	2	Nemzeti Bajnokság II (Mátyás Group)	2nd	As Nagybányai SE
1941–42	2	Nemzeti Bajnokság II (Mátyás Group)	4th	As Nagybányai SE
1940–41	2	Nemzeti Bajnokság II (Erdély Group)	2nd	As Nagybányai SE
1939–40	1	Divizia A	7th	As Carpați Baia Mare
1938–39	1	Divizia A	7th	As Carpați Baia Mare
1937–38	1	Divizia A (Group 1)	5th	First top-flight season
1936–37	2	Divizia B	1st (C, P)	Promoted
1935–36	2	Divizia B (Seria III)	1st (C)	Lost promotion play-off
1934–35	2	Divizia B (Seria III)	1st (C)	Lost promotion play-off
1932–34	—	Baia Mare District Championship	—	Positions unverified; seasons grouped
