= József Moravetz =

Romanian footballer

József Moravetz / Iosif Moravet
Personal information
- Date of birth: 14 January 1911
- Place of birth: Austria-Hungary (now Romania)
- Date of death: 16 February 1990 (aged 79)
- Position: Midfielder

Senior career*
| Years | Team | Apps | (Gls) |
| 1930–1935 | RGMT Timişoara | | |
| 1935–1936 | Ripensia Timișoara | 2 | (0) |

International career
| 1931–1934 | Romania | 10 | (0) |
- * Club domestic league appearances and goals

József Moravetz or Iosif Moravet' (14 January 1911 – 16 February 1990) was a Romanian footballer who played as a midfielder.

== Biography ==
Moravetz was born in Austria-Hungary, now in Romania. He played in Liga I for RGMT Timişoara, and played in the 1934 World Cup in Italy. They were eliminated in the first round after losing 2–1 to Czechoslovakia.

== Honours ==
Ripensia Timișoara

- Liga I (1): 1935–36
- Cupa României (1): 1935–36

== Notes and references ==
- Evidence of József Moravetz's caps for Romania national football team
- József Moravetz at WorldFootball.net
- József Moravetz at National-Football-Teams.com
