= 1935–36 Divizia A =

24th season of top-tier football league in Romania

Divizia A
- Season: 1935–36
- Champions: Ripensia Timişoara
- Top goalscorer: Ștefan Barbu (23)

The 1935–36 Divizia A was the twenty-fourth season of Divizia A, the top-level football league of Romania.

== Teams ==
Location of teams in 1935-36 Divizia A

== League table ==
Pos	Team	Pld	W	D	L	GF	GA	GD	Pts	Qualification or relegation
1	Ripensia Timișoara (C)	22	13	4	5	59	37	+22	30	Champions of Romania
2	AMEF Arad	22	11	6	5	40	27	+13	28	
3	Juventus București	22	9	6	7	48	32	+16	24	
4	CA Oradea	22	9	6	7	37	32	+5	24	
5	Venus București	22	9	6	7	57	50	+7	24	
6	Gloria Arad	22	10	2	10	45	50	−5	22	
7	CFR București	22	10	0	12	55	50	+5	20	
8	Crișana Oradea	22	8	3	11	44	48	−4	19	
9	Chinezul Timișoara	22	8	3	11	45	58	−13	19	
10	Victoria Cluj	22	8	3	11	39	57	−18	19	
11	Unirea Tricolor București	22	7	5	10	54	58	−4	19	
12	Universitatea Cluj (O)	22	7	2	13	29	53	−24	16	Qualification to relegation play-offs

Source: LT
Rules for classification: 1) points; 2) goal difference; 3) number of goals scored
(C) Champions; (O) Play-off winners

=== Results ===
Home \ Away	AME	CAO	CFR	CHI	CRI	GLA	JUV	RIP	UTB	UCJ	VEN	VCL
AMEF Arad	—	2–2	2–0	3–0	2–0	3–1	2–1	1–0	3–1	2–1	0–1	4–1
CA Oradea	0–0	—	2–0	1–0	3–0	1–0	1–1	1–0	4–1	4–0	1–0	0–1
CFR București	0–1	3–1	—	7–2	0–3	3–4	4–1	1–4	3–4	4–0	4–6	4–1
Chinezul Timișoara	1–1	3–1	1–4	—	5–3	3–2	2–2	1–6	2–0	3–1	1–1	2–1
Crișana Oradea	1–2	2–1	1–3	4–1	—	6–1	1–1	2–2	3–2	1–0	2–2	3–0
Gloria Arad	2–2	2–2	4–2	3–1	2–1	—	2–1	4–1	3–0	3–2	1–3	5–4
Juventus București	1–0	3–2	1–3	6–1	7–1	0–2	—	2–0	2–2	5–0	5–0	2–0
Ripensia Timișoara	1–1	5–1	1–0	3–2	4–1	1–0	1–1	—	3–2	5–2	6–3	7–4
Unirea Tricolor București	4–2	3–4	2–5	1–6	3–1	4–1	2–2	3–3	—	6–0	2–5	5–0
Universitatea Cluj	1–0	3–3	5–0	2–1	0–4	2–1	3–0	0–2	1–2	—	2–1	1–1
Venus București	4–4	1–1	1–3	2–5	4–2	6–1	2–1	5–2	3–3	4–0	—	1–2
Victoria Cluj	4–3	2–1	3–2	4–2	3–2	2–1	1–3	0–2	2–2	1–3	2–2	—

Source: LT
Legend: Blue = home team win; Yellow = draw; Red = away team win.

== Promotion / relegation play-off ==
Team 1	Agg.	Team 2	1st leg	2nd leg
Universitatea Cluj	5–1	ILSA Timișoara	4–1	1–0

== Top goalscorers ==
Rank	Player	Club	Goals
1	Ștefan Barbu	CFR București	23
2	Grațian Sepi	Venus București	18
3	Valeriu Niculescu	Unirea Tricolor București	16
3	Ștefan Perneki	AMEF Arad	16
5	Petea Vâlcov	Venus București	14

== Champion squad ==
Ripensia Timişoara

Goalkeepers: Dumitru Pavlovici (14 / 0); Vilmos Zombori (8 / 0).
Defenders: Rudolf Bürger (18 / 0); Francisc Agner (11 / 0); Balázs Hoksary (14 / 0); Vasile Chiroiu (18 / 6); Traian Sandor (1 / 0).
Midfielders: Vasile Deheleanu (9 / 0); Rudolf Kotormány (18 / 0); Eugen Lakatos (18 / 2); József Moravetz (2 / 0); Gall (13 / 0).
Forwards: Silviu Bindea (22 / 9); Zoltan Beke (12 / 5); Gheorghe Ciolac (21 / 11); Sándor Schwartz (18 / 13); Ștefan Dobay (21 / 12); Nicolae Kovács (4 / 1);.
(league appearances and goals listed in brackets)

Manager: Rudolf Wetzer / Jenő Konrád (Hungary) .

== See also ==
- 1935–36 Divizia B
