= 1933 Balkan Cup =

Tournament details
- Country: Romania
- Venue(s): Stadionul Oficiul Naţional de Educaţie Fizică, Bucharest
- Dates: 3–11 June 1933
- Teams: 4

Final positions
- Champions: Romania (2nd title)
- Runners-up: Yugoslavia
- Third place: Bulgaria

Tournament statistics
- Matches played: 6
- Goals scored: 27 (4.5 per match)
- Top goal scorer(s): (Romania) Gheorghe Ciolac (Romania) Ștefan Dobay (4 goals)
- All statistics correct as of 4 August 1932.

The 1933 Balkan Cup was the fourth Balkan Cup football tournament. The national teams of Yugoslavia, Greece, Bulgaria and Romania took part and it was won by Romania, the host of the tournament. Remarkably, Romania didn't concede a single goal throughout the whole tournament. The top goalscorers were Gheorghe Ciolac and Ștefan Dobay (both Romania) with 4 goals each.

== Final standings ==
Pos	Team	Pld	W	D	L	GF	GA	GR	Pts	Qualification
1	Romania (C)	3	3	0	0	13	0	—	6	Winners
2	Yugoslavia	3	2	0	1	9	8	1.125	4	
3	Bulgaria	3	1	0	2	2	11	0.182	2	
4	Greece	3	0	0	3	3	8	0.375	0	

Source: EU.football
(C) Champions

== Matches ==
3 June 1933
18:00 (+3:00)

Greece	3–5	Yugoslavia
Simeonidis 4'; Raggos 60'; Pierrakos 89'	Report	Kodrnja 12', 20', 72'; Živković 42', 79'

Stadionul Oficiul Naţional de Educaţie Fizică, Bucharest
Attendance: 6,000
Referee: Denis Xifando (Romania)

4 June 1933
16:30 (+3:00)

Romania	7–0	Bulgaria
Vâlcov 11', 76'; Dobay 53', 62'; Ciolac 57', 61', 66'	Report

Stadionul Oficiul Naţional de Educaţie Fizică, Bucharest
Attendance: 15,000
Referee: Stavros Hatzopoulos (Greece)

7 June 1933
18:00 (+3:00)

Bulgaria	0–4	Yugoslavia
	Report	Kokotović 10', 54', 75'; Živković 22'

Stadionul Oficiul Naţional de Educaţie Fizică, Bucharest
Attendance: 5,000
Referee: Stavros Hatzopoulos (Greece)

8 June 1933
18:00 (+3:00)

Romania	1–0	Greece
Dobay 24'	Report

Stadionul Oficiul Naţional de Educaţie Fizică, Bucharest
Attendance: 15,000
Referee: Ernest Fabris (Yugoslavia)

10 June 1933

Bulgaria	2–0	Greece
Todorov 85', 88'	Report

Stadionul Oficiul Naţional de Educaţie Fizică, Bucharest
Attendance: 8,000
Referee: Constantin Rădulescu (Romania)

11 June 1933
18:00 (+3:00)

Romania	5–0	Yugoslavia
Bindea 7'; Ciolac 10'; Bodola 13', 35'; Dobay 42'	Report

Stadionul Oficiul Naţional de Educaţie Fizică, Bucharest
Attendance: 28,000
Referee: Nikola Dosev (Bulgaria)

== Winner ==
1933 Balkan Cup

Romania
Second title

== Statistics ==
=== Goalscorers ===
There were 27 goals scored in 6 matches, for an average of 4.5 goals per match.

4 goals

- (Romania) Gheorghe Ciolac
- (Romania) Ștefan Dobay

3 goals

- (Kingdom of Yugoslavia) Aleksandar Zivkovic
- (Kingdom of Yugoslavia) Mirko Kokotovic
- (Kingdom of Yugoslavia) Slavko Kodrnja

2 goals

- (Romania) Iuliu Bodola
- (Romania) Petea Vâlcov
- (Bulgaria) Vladimir Todorov

1 goal

- (Greece) Theologos Simeonidis
- (Greece) Hristoforos Raggos
- (Greece) Mimis Pierrakos
- (Romania) Silviu Bindea
