= Stadionul UMT =

Former Romanian stadium

UMT Stadium
- Stadionul UMT
- Interactive map of UMT Stadium
- Former names: Stadionul Electrica (1928–1960)
- Address: Aleea Avram Imbroane, nr. 56
- Location: Timișoara, Romania
- Coordinates: 45°46′13.5″N 21°15′15.5″E
- Capacity: 9,900
- Surface: Grass

Construction
- Opened: 1928
- Renovated: 2001
- Closed: 2008
- Demolished: 2016

Tenants
- Ripensia Timișoara (1928–1948); Electrica Timișoara (1929–1960); UM Timișoara (1970–2008)

UMT Stadium (Romanian: Stadionul UMT) was a multi-purpose stadium in Timișoara, Romania. Until 1960 the stadium was known as Stadionul Electrica and was the main home ground in Timișoara for athletics championships, being also the stadium where Olympic champion Iolanda Balaș made her debut. Ripensia Timișoara (until 1948) and Electrica Timișoara (until 1960) also used the stadium as the home ground for football matches.

In 1960 the stadium entered into possession of Uzinele Mecanice Timișoara (UMT) and a sports complex was built around it, consisting of another stadium and various grounds. The new stadium was named Stadionul Electrica and the old one was renamed after the owner of the sports complex, Stadionul UMT. This name changing of the stadiums and their location, just a few meters from each other, were favorable factors in creating some confusion over time.

From the 1970s Stadionul UMT was the home ground of UM Timișoara, a football team founded in 1960 by the same Uzinele Mecanice Timișoara (UMT). Between 2001 and 2002 this stadium was the home ground for Liga I matches, but was closed in 2008, when UM Timișoara relegated to Liga IV, being dissolved by its owner, UMT. After 2008 the stadium was closed and reached the state of dereliction before being demolished in 2016. Stadionul UMT had a capacity of 9,900 seats.

Currently, the site of the former UMT Stadium is occupied by an aquapark.
