= 1932–33 Divizia A =

21st season of top-tier football league in Romania

Divizia A
- Season: 1932–33
- Champions: Ripensia Timișoara
- Matches: 84
- Goals: 322 (3.83 per match)
- Top goalscorer: Ștefan Dobay (15)
- Biggest home win: Ripensia 11–0 Tricolor
- Biggest away win: Șoimii 1–9 CFR
- Highest scoring: Ripensia 11–0 Tricolor

The 1932–33 Divizia A was the twenty-first season of Divizia A, the top tier of Romanian football, and the first to be contested under a nationwide league format, replacing the regional, cup-style system used in previous seasons. The competition marked a major restructuring of Romanian football, introducing a regular league championship with teams divided into two groups of seven.

The Romanian Football Federation initially planned a 16-team competition, with places allocated primarily according to results in the 1931–32 regional championships. Most clubs qualified through their respective regional leagues, although several were admitted through special decisions by the federation, notably Ripensia Timișoara, Romania's first professional football club. The withdrawal of UD Reșița and Mureșul Târgu Mureș before the start of the season reduced the number of participating teams to 14.

The winners of the two groups advanced to a two-legged championship final to determine the national champion.

== Team selection ==
- Bucharest: Venus București and CFR București.
- Arad: Gloria CFR Arad and AMEF Arad.
- Banat: UD Reșița and RGM Timișoara.
- Cluj: Universitatea Cluj and România Cluj.
- Oradea: Crișana Oradea and CA Oradea.
- Prahova: Tricolor Ploiești.
- Brașov: Brașovia Brașov, selected instead of district champions IAR Brașov.
- Mureș: Mureșul Târgu Mureș.
- Sibiu: Șoimii Sibiu.

Two additional clubs were admitted by special decisions of the federation: Ripensia Timișoara, Romania's first professional football club, and Unirea Tricolor București, which was preferred over Eastern League champions Maccabi Cernăuți.

Before the season began, UD Reșița withdrew due to financial difficulties, while Mureșul Târgu Mureș failed to confirm its participation. Their withdrawals reduced the competition from 16 to 14 teams.

== Group 1 ==
=== League table ===
Pos	Team	Pld	W	D	L	GF	GA	GD	Pts	Qualification or relegation
1	Ripensia Timișoara (C)	12	10	0	2	49	10	+39	20	Advances to final
2	CFR București	12	8	1	3	34	15	+19	17	
3	Crișana Oradea	12	7	1	4	22	22	0	15	
4	Gloria CFR Arad	12	6	1	5	21	20	+1	13	
5	Tricolor Ploiești	12	3	3	6	12	27	−15	9	
6	România Cluj (O)	12	2	2	8	11	25	−14	6	Qualification to relegation play-offs
7	Șoimii Sibiu (O)	12	1	2	9	7	37	−30	4	Qualification to relegation play-offs

Source: LT
Rules for classification: 1) points; 2) goal difference; 3) number of goals scored
(C) Champions; (O) Play-off winners

=== Results ===
Home \ Away	CFR	CRI	GLA	RIP	ROM	TRI	SOI
CFR București	—	4–0	3–1	3–2	2–1	2–0	0–1
Crișana Oradea	1–1	—	2–1	0–1	3–0	4–1	5–1
Gloria CFR Arad	3–2	0–2	—	4–3	4–0	1–1	3–2
Ripensia Timișoara	2–1	9–1	4–1	—	3–0	11–0	6–0
România Cluj	3–4	0–1	1–2	0–4	—	2–0	3–1
Tricolor Ploiești	0–3	4–1	3–0	0–1	1–1	—	4–0
Șoimii Sibiu	1–9	0–2	0–1	0–3	0–0	1–1	—

Source: LT
Legend: Blue = home team win; Yellow = draw; Red = away team win.
For upcoming matches, an "a" indicates there is an article about the rivalry between the two participants.

== Group 2 ==
=== League table ===
Pos	Team	Pld	W	D	L	GF	GA	GD	Pts	Qualification or relegation
1	Universitatea Cluj (A)	12	8	2	2	24	15	+9	18	Advances to final
2	CA Oradea	12	8	1	3	30	17	+13	17	
3	Unirea Tricolor București	12	7	2	3	31	21	+10	16	
4	Venus București	12	6	4	2	34	17	+17	16	
5	AMEF Arad	12	4	0	8	17	35	−18	8	
6	RGM Timișoara (R)	12	3	2	7	17	27	−10	8	Qualification to relegation play-offs
7	Brașovia Brașov (O)	12	0	1	11	10	31	−21	1	Qualification to relegation play-offs

Source: LT
Rules for classification: 1) points; 2) goal difference; 3) number of goals scored
(A) Advance to a further round; (O) Play-off winners; (R) Relegated

=== Results ===
Home \ Away	AME	BRA	CAO	RGM	UTB	UCJ	VEN
AMEF Arad	—	2–0	3–2	3–2	0–4	1–3	3–6
Brașovia Brașov	0–2	—	2–4	1–2	0–2	0–3	1–1
CA Oradea	2–0	3–0	—	5–0	7–3	1–0	0–0
RGM Timișoara	4–1	3–2	2–4	—	0–0	1–2	2–2
Unirea Tricolor București	4–1	3–1	1–0	4–1	—	2–2	3–1
Universitatea Cluj	2–0	3–2	0–2	1–0	4–3	—	1–0
Venus București	6–1	3–1	6–0	2–0	4–2	3–3	—

Source: LT
Legend: Blue = home team win; Yellow = draw; Red = away team win.
For upcoming matches, an "a" indicates there is an article about the rivalry between the two participants.

== Final ==
Team 1	Agg.	Team 2	1st leg	2nd leg
Ripensia Timișoara	5–3	Universitatea Cluj	5–3	0–0

== Top goalscorers ==
Rank	Player	Club	Goals
1	Ștefan Dobay	Ripensia Timișoara	16
2	Petea Vâlcov	Venus București	13
3	Vasile Chiroiu	CFR București	12
4	Elemer Kocsis	CA Oradea	11
4	Ladislau Raffinski	Ripensia Timișoara	11

== Champion squad ==
Ripensia Timișoara

Goalkeepers: Vilmos Zombori (11 / 1); Ioan Babin (3 / 0).
Defenders: Francisc Agner (9 / 0); Rudolf Bürger (12 / 0); Balázs Hoksary (8 / 2).
Midfielders: Adalbert Hrehuss (7 / 0); Rudolf Kotormány (13 / 1); Eugen Lakatos (14 / 2); Vasile Deheleanu (8 / 1).
Forwards: Silviu Bindea (12 / 7); Sándor Schwartz (13 / 8); Gheorghe Ciolac (13 / 3); László Raffinsky (13 / 11); Ștefan Dobay (14 / 16); Zoltán Beke (4 / 1).
(league appearances and goals listed in brackets)

Manager: Jenő Konrád (Hungary) .
