= Silviu Bindea =

Romanian footballer and manager

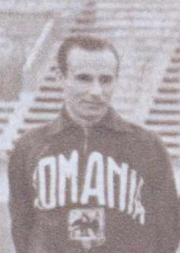
- Bindea in 1940

Personal information
- Full name: Silviu Bindea
- Date of birth: 24 October 1912
- Place of birth: Blaj, Austria-Hungary
- Date of death: 9 March 1992 (aged 79)
- Place of death: Blaj, Romania
- Height: 1.77 m (5 ft 10 in)
- Position: Striker

Senior career*
| Years | Team | Apps | (Gls) |
| 1930–1932 | Romania Cluj | 27 | (12) |
| 1932–1939 | Ripensia Timișoara | 121 | (68) |
| 1939–1940 | CAM Timișoara | 17 | (10) |
| 1940–1942 | Ripensia Timișoara | 20 | (10) |
| 1942–1943 | CFR Turnu Severin | 3 | (0) |
| 1945 | Dura Timișoara | 8 | (1) |
| 1946–1947 | CFR Timișoara | 4 | (0) |
| 1948–1949 | Ripensia Timișoara | 13 | (2) |
| Total | | 203 | (103) |

International career
| 1932–1942 | Romania | 27 | (11) |

Managerial career
- 1955: Politehnica Timişoara
- 1960: Politehnica Timişoara
- * Club domestic league appearances and goals

Silviu Bindea (24 October 1912 – 6 March 1992) was a Romanian football player and coach.

He represented Romania at the 1934 and 1938 World Cups as a forward, scoring twice in a first-round game in 1938.

== Honours ==
=== Player ===
Ripensia Timișoara

- Liga I (4): 1932–33, 1934–35, 1935–36, 1937–38
- Cupa României (2): 1933–34, 1935–36
