= Alexandru Săvulescu (footballer) =

Romanian football manager

Personal information
- Date of birth: 8 January 1898
- Place of birth: Roman, Romania
- Date of death: 11 December 1961 (aged 63)

Managerial career
- Years: Team
- 1938: Romania

Alexandru Săvulescu (8 January 1898 – 11 December 1961) was a Romanian football manager who coached Romania in the 1938 FIFA World Cup.
