= Rudolf Wetzer =

Romanian footballer (1901–1993)

Rudy Wetzer
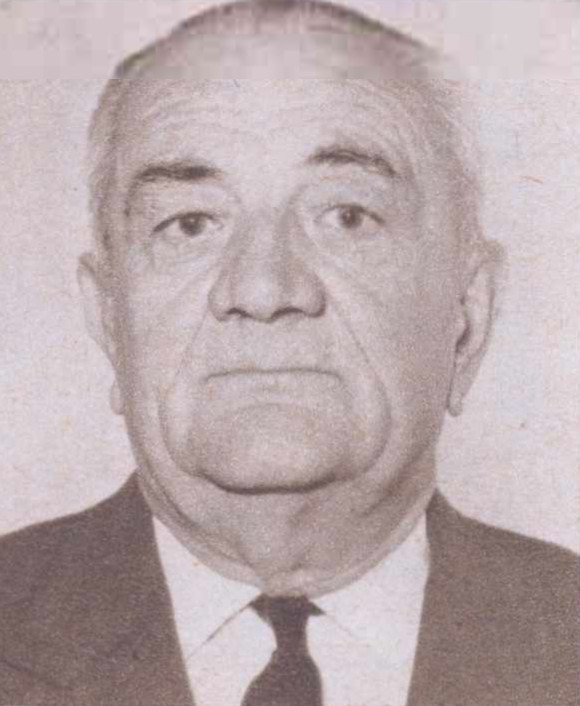
- Wetzer in 1966

Personal information
- Full name: Rudolf Wetzer I
- Date of birth: 17 March 1901
- Place of birth: Temesvár, Austria-Hungary
- Date of death: 13 April 1993 (aged 92)
- Place of death: Haifa, Israel
- Position: Striker

Senior career*
| Years | Team | Apps | (Gls) |
| 1920–1921 | Chinezul Timişoara | 3 | (8) |
| 1921–1922 | Törekvés SE | 23 | (6) |
| 1922–1924 | Unirea Timișoara | 15 | (20) |
| 1924–1925 | BSK Belgrade | 2 | (1) |
| 1925–1928 | Chinezul Timişoara | 27 | (26) |
| 1929 | Újpest | 16 | (7) |
| 1929 | Pécs-Baranya | 10 | (5) |
| 1930–1931 | Juventus București | 8 | (11) |
| 1931–1932 | Ripensia Timişoara | 4 | (5) |
| 1932–1933 | FC Hyères | 13 | (5) |
| 1934–1935 | ILSA Timișoara | | |
| 1935–1936 | Rovine Grivița Craiova | | |
| 1936–1937 | Progresul Timișoara | | |
| Total | | 121 | (94) |

International career
| 1923–1932 | Romania | 17 | (13) |

Managerial career
- 1930: Juventus București
- 1935: Ripensia Timişoara
- 1935–1936: ILSA Timișoara
- 1936–1938: Progresul Timișoara
- 1938–1939: Tricolor Ploieşti
- 1940–1947: Oţelul Reşiţa
- 1948–1949: Dinamo București
- 1952: Dinamo Oraşul Stalin
- * Club domestic league appearances and goals

Rudolf 'Rudy' Wetzer (17 March 1901 – 13 April 1993) was a Romanian football player and manager. He was the captain and team-coach alongside Octav Luchide, under the management of Costel Rădulescu of the first Romanian side to participate in a FIFA World Cup. He was of Jewish ethnicity. His brothers Ștefan and Ioan were also footballers.

== Club career ==
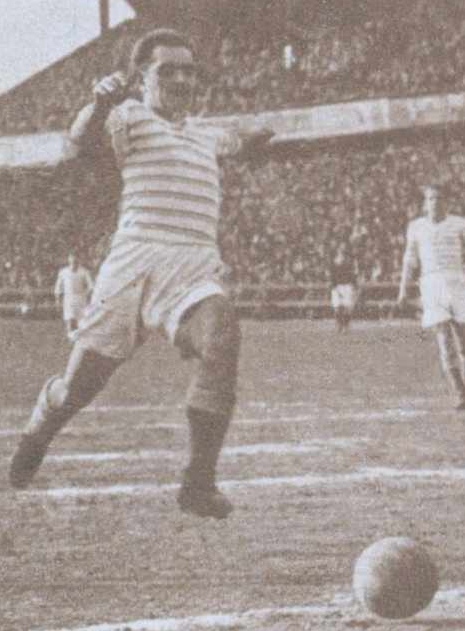
Wetzer playing for Újpest in 1929

In club football, Wezter played for Juventus București (who were Romanian national champions in the 1929–1930 season), as such he was a colleague of squad members Vogl and Ladislau Raffinsky. In the 1920s, he had played for Unirea Timişoara (appearing, whilst with them, at the 1924 Olympic Games) and Chinezul before moving on. His last matches for Romania (played while he was playing for Ripensia) were in 1932; his last match came in a 2–0 defeat to Bulgaria in Belgrade. Otherwise he played for BSK Belgrade, Újpest FC, Pécs-Baranya, Hyères FC, ILSA Timișoara and Craiovan Craiova. While playing in Hungary, he used the name Rudolf Veder, in Serbia, Rudolf Večer.

When BSK brought Wetzer along another Romanian, Dezideriu Laki, to its team in 1924, they became the first foreign professionals to play in Serbia.

== International career ==
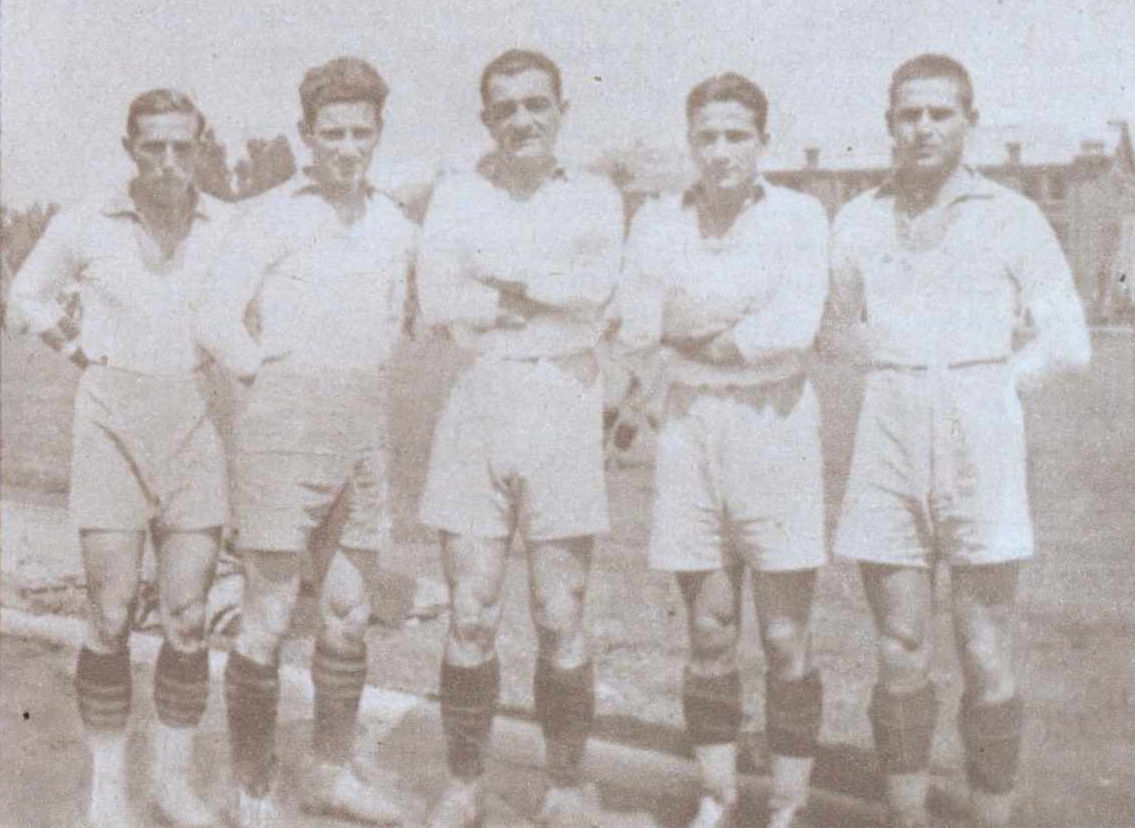
Wetzer in 1932 (pictured center) with several Romanian internationals after their friendly match against France, which Romania won 6–3.

During the 1930 FIFA World Cup Wetzer became Romania's team captain and team-coach alongside Octav Luchide, under the management of Costel Rădulescu. This was Rădulescu's decision in the weeks prior to the tournament. In May 1930 the Romanians had lost the King Alexander's Cup (a two-team event) to Yugoslavia in Belgrade. At the time Emerich Vogl was team captain. Wetzer was brought back into the side two weeks' later for a friendly against Greece in Bucharest. This decision reaped considerable rewards for both Rădulescu and Wetzer as Wetzer scored 5 goals in an 8–1 victory for his team. Romania had been grouped with Uruguay and Peru in the tournament. They defeated the Peruvians 3–1 before losing to the eventual winners and hosts 4–0. The second of these games was held at the Estadio Centenario in Montevideo.

Wetzer was a very prolific scorer for Romania. He and Bodola were the top two goalscorers of the 1929–31 (first) edition of the Balkan Cup (which Romania won). They scored 7 goals each for their country in that tournament alone.

In total Wetzer was to play 17 times for Romania scoring 13 goals.

== Coaching career ==
After retiring as a footballer, he coached a number of clubs in Romania. In 1958, during a purge by the ruling national party against "revisionism and bourgeois ideology, indiscipline and descriptive anarchic elements" Wetzer became subject to an order forbidding him from "leaving the collective in which he was engaged without good reason, under penalty of being expelled from the trainers' corps.

== Honours ==
=== Player ===
Chinezul Timișoara

- Divizia A: 1925–26, 1926–27

Juventus București

- Divizia A: 1929–30

=== Coach ===
Ripensia Timișoara

- Divizia A: 1934–35, 1935–36
