= 1933–34 Cupa României =

Romanian Cup
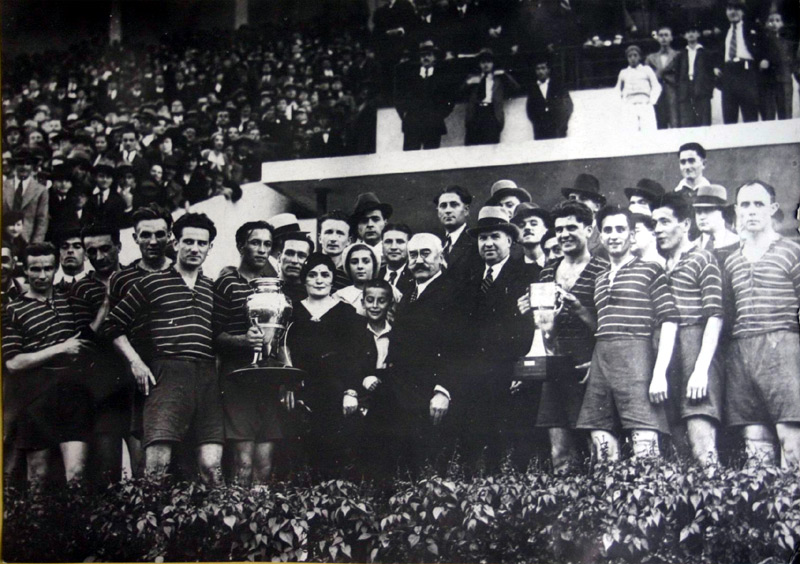
- Ripensia Timişoara receiving the cup from Alexandru Vaida-Voevod, Prime Minister of Romania

Tournament details
- Country: Romania
- Teams: 65

Final positions
- Champions: Ripensia Timișoara (1st title)
- Runners-up: Universitatea Cluj

Tournament statistics
- Matches played: 31
- Goals scored: 169 (5.45 per match)

The 1933–34 Cupa României was the inaugural season of the Romania's most prestigious football (soccer) cup competition.

In order to promote the competition and encourage clubs to register to the cup, no taxes were enforced on the participants. From the sixty-eight teams registered for the competition, fifty-two were not competing in the top-flight.

The competition started in the autumn of 1933. The first phases involved only teams coming from district leagues. The draws were made taking in account logistic difficulties, and sixteen of these clubs advanced to the first round proper, where they were joined by the sixteen teams from Diviza A. The results of the preliminary phase were not recorded.

The first winners were Ripensia Timișoara, who defeated Universitatea Cluj in the final. The trophy was handed by Alexandru Vaida-Voevod to the captain of Ripensia, Silviu Bindea.

First edition of Romanian Cup debuted on 6 April 1931 and it was reserved just for teams of League. After it disputed two editions, both won by the team of North League which defeated in final the teams of South League and East League, on 24 September 1933 it started a new competition with a formula which is today too. Number of teams extended from 65 at first edition, to 4.129 in season 1964–1965. From the first edition, the teams from Divizia A entered in competition in sixteen finals, rule which remained till today.

== Format ==
The competition is an annual knockout tournament with pairings for each round drawn at random.

There are no seeds for the draw. The draw also determines which teams will play at home. Each tie is played as a single leg.

If a match is drawn after 90 minutes, the game goes in extra time, and if the scored is still tight after 120 minutes, there a replay will be played, usually at the ground of the team who were away for the first game.

From the first edition, the teams from Divizia A entered in competition in sixteen finals, rule which remained till today.

The format is quite similar to the oldest recognised football tournament in the world, the FA Cup.

== Bracket ==
Round of 32
România Cluj	1
CFR București	2
Vulturii Textila Lugoj	1
AMEF Arad	2
Mureşul Târgu Mureş	2
Phoenix Baia Mare	4
Tricolor Ploiești	6
Electrica Timișoara	1
Șoimii Sibiu	0
Ripensia Timișoara	7
Franco-Româna Brăila	1
Gloria CFR Arad	2
Venus București	7
Unirea MV Alba Iulia	0
Chinezul Timișoara	2
Avântul Buzău	0
Unirea Tricolor București	1
CA Oradea	0
Transilvania Arad	3
Olympia București	2
UD Reșița	5
Juventus București	0
Jiul Petroșani	0
AS CFR Brașov	1
CA Timișoara	9
Sportul Studențesc	0
Maccabi București	0
Universitatea Cluj	4
Olympia CFR Satu Mare	6
Brașovia Brașov	1
Crișana Oradea	3
Sticla Diciosânmartin	0

Round of 16
CFR București	2
AMEF Arad	4
Phoenix Baia Mare	11
Tricolor Ploiești	0
Ripensia Timișoara	6
Gloria CFR Arad	4
Venus București	7
Chinezul Timișoara	5
Unirea Tricolor București	8
Transilvania Arad	3
UD Reșița	3
AS CFR Brașov	0
CA Timișoara	2
Universitatea Cluj	4
Olympia CFR Satu Mare	3
Crișana Oradea	1

Quarter-finals
AMEF Arad	1
Phoenix Baia Mare	0
Ripensia Timișoara	6
Venus București	3
Unirea Tricolor București	0
UD Reșița	2
Universitatea Cluj	6
Olympia CFR Satu Mare	1

Semi-finals
AMEF Arad	1
Ripensia Timișoara	3
UD Reșița	2
Universitatea Cluj	3

Final
Ripensia Timișoara	5
Universitatea Cluj	0

== First round proper ==
Team 1	Score	Team 2
31 March 1934
Venus București (Div. A)	7–0	(District) Unirea Mihai Viteazul Alba Iulia
1 April 1934
CA Timişoara (District)	9–0	(District) Sportul Studențesc București
Șoimii Sibiu (Div. A)	0–7	(Div. A) Ripensia Timișoara
Crișana Oradea (Div. A)	3–0	(District) Sticla Diciosânmartin
Chinezul Timișoara (Div. A)	2–0	(District) Avântul Buzău
Jiul Petroșani (District)	0–1	(District) AS CFR Brașov
Unirea Tricolor București (Div. A)	1–0	(Div. A) CA Oradea
Olympia CFR Satu Mare (District)	6–1	(Div. A) Brașovia Brașov
Tricolor Ploiești (Div. A)	6–1	(District) Electrica Timișoara
Mureşul Târgu Mureş (Div. A)	2–4	(District) Phoenix Baia Mare
Vulturii Textila Lugoj (District)	1–2	(Div. A) AMEF Arad
România Cluj (Div. A)	1–2	(Div. A) CFR București
Transilvania Arad (District)	3–2	(Div. A) Olympia București
UD Reșița (District)	2–0^{1}	(Div. A) Juventus București
22 April 1934
Franco-Româna Brăila (District)	1–2	(Div. A) Gloria CFR Arad
Maccabi București (District)	0–4	(Div. A) Universitatea Cluj
29 April 1934 — Replay
UD Reșița (District)	5–0 (R)	(Div. A) Juventus București

Notes

- Note 1: The match was contested and it was replayed.

== Second round proper ==
Team 1	Score	Team 2
9 April 1934
Unirea Tricolor București	8–3	Transilvania Arad
29 March 1934
Phoenix Baia Mare	11–0	Tricolor Ploiești
CA Timișoara	2–4	Universitatea Cluj
1 May 1934
Venus București	7–5	Chinezul Timișoara
Olympia CFR Satu Mare	3–1	Crișana Oradea
CFR București	2–4	AMEF Arad
6 May 1934
UD Reșița	3–0	AS CFR Brașov
13 May 1934
Ripensia Timișoara	6–4	Gloria CFR Arad

== Quarter-finals ==
Team 1	Score	Team 2
18 May 1934
Ripensia Timișoara	6–3	Venus București
Unirea Tricolor București	3–3, 3–5 (a.e.t.)	UD Reșița
Universitatea Cluj	6–1	Olympia CFR Satu Mare
AMEF Arad	1–0	Phoenix Baia Mare

== Semi-finals ==
Team 1	Score	Team 2
17 June 1934
AMEF Arad	1–3	Ripensia Timișoara
UD Reșița	2–3	Universitatea Cluj

== Final ==
8 September 1934

Ripensia Timișoara	3–2	Universitatea Cluj
Schwartz 5'; Dobay 29'; Ciolac 85'	Report	Ploeşteanu 18'; Surlaşiu 64'

Electrica, Timișoara
Attendance: 3,000

=== Replay ===
30 September 1934
15:30 EET

Ripensia Timișoara	5–0	Universitatea Cluj
Dobay 18', 20'; Bindea 41', 85'; Schwartz 48'	Report

ONEF, Bucharest
Attendance: 10,000
Referee: Denis Xifando (Bucharest)

Cupa României 1933–34 winners

1st title
