= Constantin Rădulescu (footballer, born 1896) =

Romanian footballer and manager

Costel Rădulescu
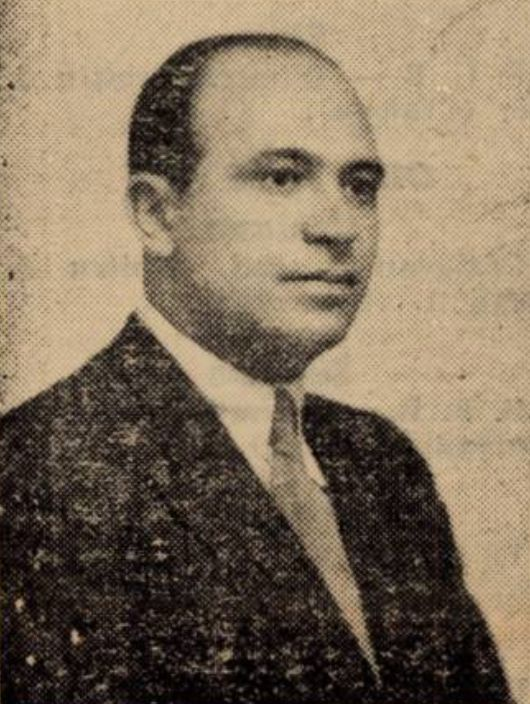

Personal information
- Full name: Constantin Rădulescu
- Date of birth: 5 October 1896
- Place of birth: Bucharest, Romania
- Date of death: 14 June 1981 (aged 84)
- Place of death: Bucharest, Romania
- Position: Goalkeeper

Senior career*
Years	Team	Apps	(Gls)
- Olympia București
–1923	Tricolor București		

Managerial career
- 1923: Romania
- 1928–1934: Romania
- 1935–1938: Romania
- * Club domestic league appearances and goals

Constantin "Costel" Rădulescu (5 October 1896 – 14 June 1981) was a Romanian footballer and manager who rose to prominence in the 1920s and 1930s. At one time or another Rădulescu had been associated with the Romania national team as either coach, manager or administrator within the Romanian Football Federation between 1923 and 1938.

== First World War activity and playing career ==
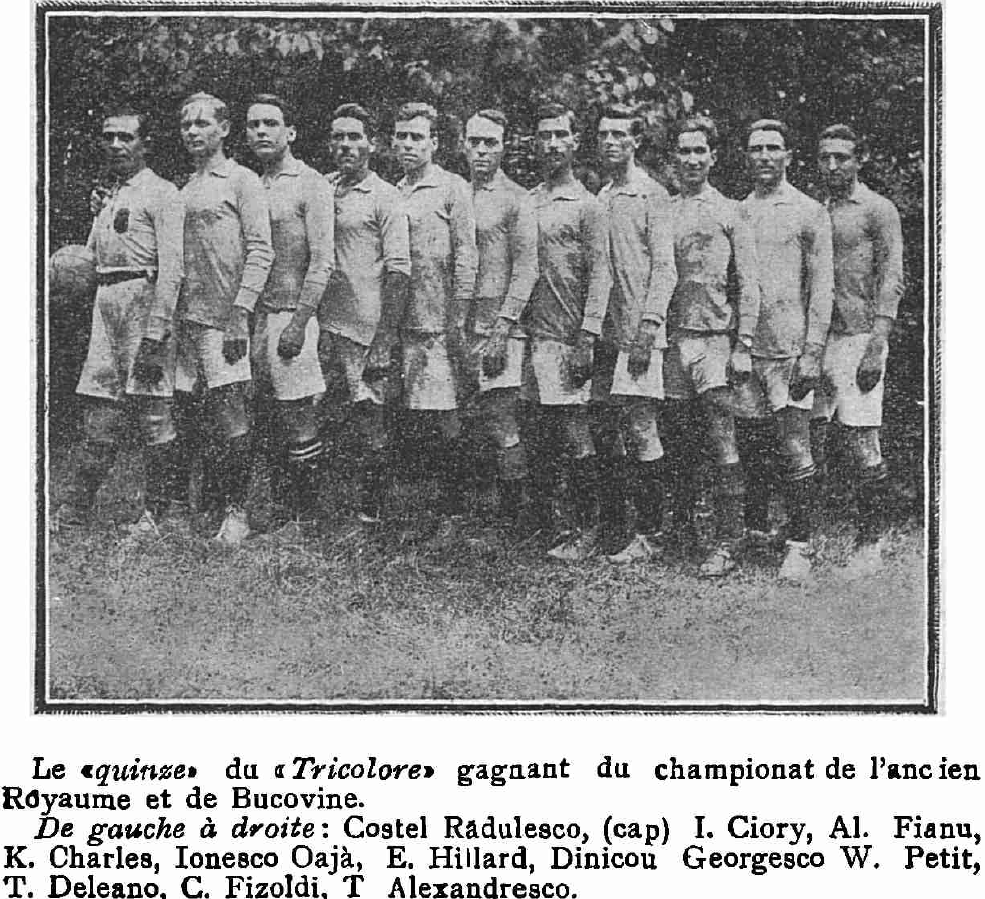
Rădulescu (first from the left) with Tricolor București in 1922

Rădulescu was born on 5 October 1896 in Bucharest, Romania. He served as an officer in the Romanian Army during World War I, fighting at the front in the Battle of Mărăști between 1916 and 1918, where he received injuries to his right arm. In 1919 he featured as a goalkeeper for the Romanian army team in the Inter-Allied Games held at the Pershing Stadium in Paris.

After the end of the war, Rădulescu played football for Olympia București and Tricolor București until 1923. After 1923, Rădulescu switched to coaching and refereeing.

== Romania's national team coach ==
Rădulescu's first spell as the coach of Romania's national team took place at age 27 in 1923 for only one game, a 2–2 friendly draw against Turkey. His second spell started in 1928 in the Friendship Cup where he lost with 3–1 to Yugoslavia. Subsequently, he led the team in the 1930 World Cup where he earned a 3–1 win over Peru, which was Romania's first victory in the competition. However, the second game of the group was lost with 4–0 to hosts and eventual winners, Uruguay. During the competition, Rădulescu, despite being Romania's coach, officiated twice as a linesman in matches featuring Argentina and Uruguay on days when Romania was not playing. He assisted as a linesman on other occasions when Romania was playing in the 1930s.

He won the 1929–31 Balkan Cup campaign, which Romania won while losing only in Sofia to Bulgaria, but scoring many goals in all matches and defeating fellow World Cup entrants Yugoslavia in both legs. Rădulescu guided Romania in the first meeting against France in June 1932, a home friendly which ended with a 6–3 victory. He won another Balkan Cup in 1933 and the 1931–1934 Central European Cup for Amateurs, also earning the qualification for the 1934 World Cup from a group with Yugoslavia and Switzerland. However, for the final tournament Josef Uridil was brought as head coach, and Rădulescu remained in the staff but with a minor role. The team lost the only game played there in the first round with 2–1 to eventual finalists Czechoslovakia.

On his third spell, Rădulescu went on to win a third Balkan Cup in 1936 and the 1936 King Carol II Cup, defeating Yugoslavia with 3–2, courtesy of a hat-trick from Iuliu Bodola. He also took part as a technical director under coach Alexandru Săvulescu in the 1938 World Cup where they were eliminated in the first round by Cuba. Rădulescu has a total of 49 matches as coach of Romania, consisting of 27 victories, 7 draws and 15 losses.

== Referee career ==
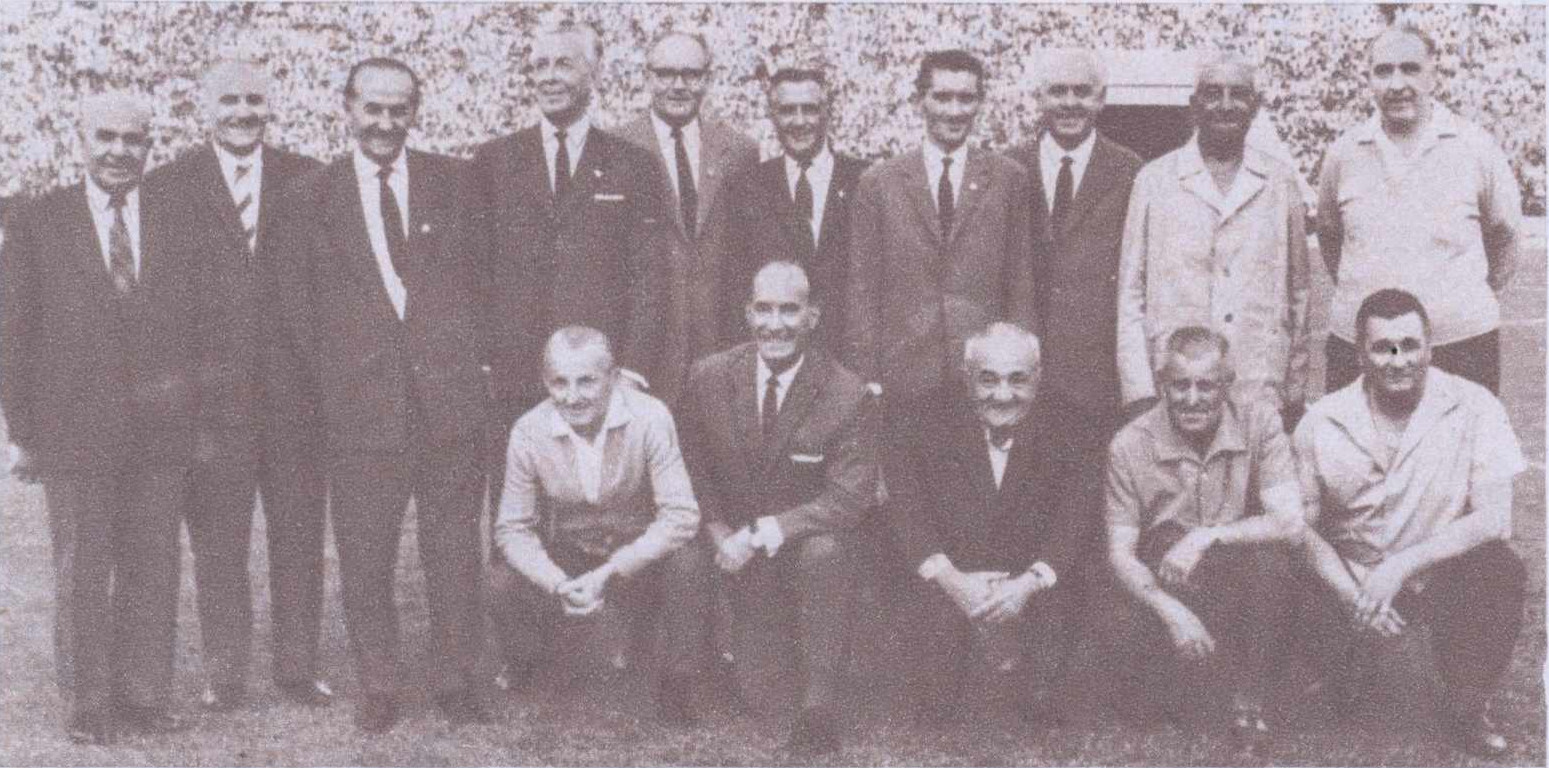
Rădulescu (standing, first from the left) in 1966

He was a referee for 20 years, officiating 49 Divizia A matches, having over 200 games as a total.

== Death ==
Rădulescu died on 14 June 1981 at age 84.

== Honours ==
=== Manager ===
Romania

- Balkan Cup: 1929–31, 1933, 1936
- Central European International Cup: 1931–34

Records

- Manager with the most Balkan Cup titles: 3 titles
