= Josef Uridil =

Austrian footballer

Personal information
- Date of birth: 24 December 1895
- Place of birth: Ottakring, Austria-Hungary
- Date of death: 20 May 1962 (aged 66)
- Position: Striker

Youth career
- Sportklub Orion
- Tasmania
- Rekord
- Blue Star

Senior career*
Years	Team	Apps	(Gls)
1910–1912	Romania Ottakring		
1912–1914	Blue Star		
1914–1925	Rapid Wien		
1925–1926	First Vienna		
1926–1927	Rapid Wien		
1929–1930	Bari		

International career
1919–1926	Austria	8	(8)

Managerial career
- 1929–1930: Bari
- 1930: HAŠK
- 1931–1933: ZFC
- 1933–1934: Blauw-Wit Amsterdam
- 1934: Ripensia Timișoara
- 1934: Romania
- 1934–1935: SPC Helfort
- 1935–1936: BSK
- 1936–1937: FC Biel
- 1937–1938: FC Luzern
- 1938–1941: Schwarz-Weiß Essen
- 1941–1943: VfL Altenbögge
- 1949–1951: Schwarz-Weiß Essen
- 1951–1952: Rheydter SV
- 1952: SF Hamborn 07
- 1953–1954: Rapid Wien
- 1954–1957: Jahn Regensburg
- * Club domestic league appearances and goals

Josef Uridil (nicknamed Pepi, der Tank; 24 December 1895 – 20 May 1962) was an Austrian footballer and coach.

== Biography ==
Pepi Uridil, third son of the taylor Kajetan Uridil, was born on Christmas Eve 1895 in the Vienna suburb of Ottakring. He began to play football aged eight in the streets of his neighbourhood with his brother Franz. Pepi Uridil played for numerous clubs in his youth, such as Sportklub Orion, Tasmania, Rekord and then Blue Star Vienne, before leaving for the great club of SK Rapid Wien in Hütteldorf.

During the First World War, he got the nickname "Tank".

Pepi Uridil played for a number of seasons with Rapid, and in 1919, his team won in the final 3–0 against Wiener Sport-Club.

Throughout his career Uridil is said to have scored around 1,000 goals.

He was one of the main players in the Championship victory in 1921 against Wiener AC. Dionys Schönecker's men were losing 1–5 at half-time, 3–5 with 15 minutes remaining, and finished with goals from Uridil to win 7–5.

Uridil was also an entrepreneur. He created his own brand of beer, Uridil, and a brand of sugar, Kracheln. The famous Viennese writer Hermann Leopoldi wrote a musical piece named Heute spielt der Uridil ("Today, Uridil is playing") in 1922. Pepi Uridil played a number of film roles, such as Pflicht und Ehre ("Necessity and Honour") in 1924.

At the end of the First World War, he became an Austrian international for the first time. He played for the Austria national football team between 1919 and 1926 and scored eight goals in eight games.

After his retirement from football, Pepi Uridil became a manager of Bratislava club. He then moved to Ripensia Timișoara and the Romania national football team for the 1934 World Cup in Italy.

His team were beaten in the first round by eventual finalists, Czechoslovakia.

He later coached Austrian side SC Helfort, then Beogradski SK in Yugoslavia in 1935. He then moved to Switzerland to coach FC Biel from 1936 to 1937, and FC Luzern until 1938. He then trained German side Schwarz-Weiß Essen between 1938 and 1941, and VfL Altenbögge between 1941 and 1943.

After the Second World War, he returned to coaching Schwarz-Weiß Essen from 1949 to 1951. He went on to train his former club, Rapid Vienna, for one season from 1953 to 1954. That year, the Austrian side beat the London club Arsenal 6–1 on 25 May 1953.

== Honours ==
- Austrian Football Bundesliga: 1916, 1919, 1920, 1921, 1923
- Austrian Cup: 1919, 1920
- Austrian Football Bundesliga top scorer: 1919, 1920 (non-official), 1921
