= Ilie Gârleanu =

Romanian footballer

Personal information
- Date of birth: 20 July 1930
- Place of birth: Rezina, Kingdom of Romania
- Date of death: August 2016 (aged 86)
- Place of death: Timișoara, Romania
- Position: Striker

Youth career
- 1943–1946: Sportul Muncitoresc Craiova

Senior career*
Years	Team	Apps	(Gls)
1946–1947	FC Craiova	16	(3)
1947–1950	Locomotiva Sibiu		
1951	CA Câmpulung Moldovenesc		
1952	CCA București	2	(0)
1952–1953	CA Câmpulung Moldovenesc		
1953–1954	Flacăra Ploiești		
1955–1963	Știința Timișoara		
1963–1964	CFR Timișoara		

International career
1954	Romania	1	(0)
- * Club domestic league appearances and goals

Ilie Gârleanu (20 July 1930 – August 2018) was a Romanian footballer who played as a striker.

== Club career ==
Ilie Gârleanu was born on 20 July 1930 in Rezina, but in 1940 together with his family he ran away in Craiova, as Bessarabia became occupied by Russians in World War II. He started playing football at junior level at Sportul Muncitoresc Craiova. Afterwards he went to play for a few clubs before settling at Știința Timișoara, where during a spell of nine seasons he won the 1957–58 Cupa României. He has a total of 156 Divizia A matches in which he scored 35 goals. In 2008 Gârleanu received the Honorary Citizen of Timișoara title.

== International career ==
Ilie Gârleanu played one friendly match for Romania, on 19 September 1954 under coach Ștefan Dobay in a 5–1 loss against Hungary.

== Honours ==
Locomotiva Sibiu

- Divizia B: 1948–49

CA Câmpulung Moldovenesc

- Divizia B: 1951

CCA București

- Divizia A: 1952

Flacăra Ploiești

- Divizia B: 1953

Știința Timișoara

- Divizia B: 1959–60
- Cupa României: 1957–58
