= 1950 Divizia B =

11th season of the Divizia B, the second tier of the Romanian football league

Divizia B
- Season: 1950
- Promoted: Dinamo Orașul Stalin; Știința Cluj
- Relegated: Progresul ICAS București; Metalul Oțelu Roșu; Flamura Roșie Bacău; Metalul Brad

The 1950 Divizia B was the 11th season of the second tier of the Romanian football league system.

The format with two series has been maintained, but each of them having 12 teams instead of 14. At the end of the season the winners of the series promoted to Divizia A and the last two places from each one of the series relegated to District Championship. Also this was the first season played in the spring-autumn system, a system imposed by the new leadership of the country which were in close ties with the Soviet Union.

== Team changes ==
=== To Divizia B ===
Promoted from Divizia C

- Armata Cluj
- CFR Iași
- Metalosport Oțelu Roșu
- Progresul ICAS București

Relegated from Divizia A

- CFR Cluj
- CSU Cluj
- Metalochimic București
- Gaz Metan Mediaș

=== From Divizia B ===
Relegated to Regional Championship

- Arsenal Sibiu
- Dermata Cluj
- CFR Ploiești
- CFR Turnu Severin
- Grivița CFR București
- Solvay Uioara
- Dezrobirea Constanța
- CAM Timișoara
- FC Călărași
- Șurianu Sebeș

Promoted to Divizia A

- CFR Sibiu
- Metalochimic Reșița

=== Renamed teams ===
Most of the teams have changed their names to have Soviet, communist, military or working class related inspiration. Among the popular names used were: Partizanul (The Partisan), Flamura Roșie (The Red Flag) or Metalul (The Metal), but also some inspired directly from the Moscow teams: Dinamo, Locomotiv or Spartac being the Romanian alternatives for Dynamo, Lokomotiv and Spartak.

ARLUS Bacău was renamed as Flamura Roșie Bacău.

Astra Română Moreni was renamed as Partizanul Moreni.

CFR Arad was renamed as Locomotiva Arad.

CFR Cluj was renamed as Locomotiva Cluj.

CFR Galați was renamed as Locomotiva Galați.

CFR Iași was renamed as Locomotiva Iași.

CFR Oradea was renamed as Locomotiva Oradea.

CFR Satu Mare was renamed as Locomotiva Satu Mare.

Concordia Ploiești was renamed as Partizanul Ploiești.

CSM Baia Mare was renamed as Metalul Baia Mare.

CSU Cluj was renamed as Știința Cluj.

Dinamo B București was moved to Orașul Stalin and renamed as Dinamo Orașul Stalin.

Gaz Metan Mediaș was renamed as Partizanul Mediaș.

IS Câmpia Turzii was renamed as Metalul Câmpia Turzii.

Metalochimic București was renamed as Metalul București.

Metalosport Oțelu Roșu was renamed as Metalul Oțelu Roșu.

Mica Brad was renamed as Metalul Brad.

Minerul Lupeni was renamed as Partizanul Lupeni.

Politehnica Iași was renamed as Știința Iași.

Textila Sfântu Gheorghe was renamed as Flamura Roșie Sfântu Gheorghe.

Țesătoria Română Pitești was renamed as Flamura Roșie Pitești.

=== Other teams ===
Socec București and Banca de Stat București merged, Socec being absorbed by Banca de Stat, which also took its place in the second league and was renamed as Spartac București.

== League tables ==
=== Serie I ===
Pos	Team	Pld	W	D	L	GF	GA	GD	Pts	Promotion or relegation
1	Dinamo Orașul Stalin (C, P)	22	15	3	4	43	14	+29	33	Promotion to Divizia A
2	Metalul București	22	13	5	4	51	18	+33	31	
3	Partizanul Moreni	22	11	4	7	53	39	+14	26	
4	Spartac București	22	11	3	8	48	32	+16	25	
5	Partizanul Ploiești	22	9	6	7	48	45	+3	24	
6	Locomotiva Iași	22	8	8	6	29	29	0	24	
7	Știința Iași	22	6	9	7	24	32	−8	21	
8	Flamura Roșie Sfântu Gheorghe	22	6	8	8	40	36	+4	20	
9	Flamura Roșie Pitești	22	7	6	9	43	45	−2	20	
10	Locomotiva Galați	22	7	5	10	35	48	−13	19	
11	Progresul ICAS București (R)	22	6	6	10	32	55	−23	18	Relegation to Regional Championship
12	Flamura Roșie Bacău (R)	22	1	1	20	17	70	−53	3	Relegation to Regional Championship

Source: romaniansoccer.ro
Rules for classification: 1) Points 2) Head-to-head points; 3) Head-to-head goal difference; 4) Head-to-head goals scored; 5) Head-to-head away goals scored; 6) Goal difference; 7) Goals scored.
(C) Champions; (P) Promoted; (R) Relegated

=== Serie II ===
Pos	Team	Pld	W	D	L	GF	GA	GD	Pts	Promotion or relegation
1	Știința Cluj (C, P)	22	14	6	2	47	16	+31	34	Promotion to Divizia A
2	Armata Cluj	22	15	3	4	44	17	+27	33	
3	Partizanul Mediaș	22	14	0	8	37	27	+10	28	
4	Partizanul Lupeni	22	10	7	5	33	24	+9	27	
5	Locomotiva Arad	22	8	5	9	28	30	−2	21	
6	Metalul Baia Mare	22	9	3	10	30	36	−6	21	
7	Locomotiva Oradea	22	8	5	9	31	40	−9	21	
8	Locomotiva Cluj	22	7	5	10	42	34	+8	19	
9	Metalul Câmpia Turzii	22	7	4	11	36	38	−2	18	
10	Locomotiva Satu Mare	22	7	4	11	28	38	−10	18	
11	Metalul Oțelu Roșu (R)	22	7	3	12	20	38	−18	17	Relegation to Regional Championship
12	Metalul Brad (R)	22	1	5	16	15	53	−38	7	Relegation to Regional Championship

Source: romaniansoccer.ro
Rules for classification: 1) Points 2) Head-to-head points; 3) Head-to-head goal difference; 4) Head-to-head goals scored; 5) Head-to-head away goals scored; 6) Goal difference; 7) Goals scored.
(C) Champions; (P) Promoted; (R) Relegated

== See also ==
- 1950 Divizia A
