= 1952 Divizia B =

13th season of the Divizia B, the second tier of the Romanian football league

Divizia B
- Season: 1952
- Promoted: Locomotiva GR București; Știința Timișoara

The 1952 Divizia B was the 13th season of the second tier of the Romanian football league system.

The format with two series has been maintained, each of them having 12 teams. At the end of the season the winners of the series promoted to Divizia A and no team was relegated to District Championship, because the series would be expanded again from the next season. Also this was the third season played in the spring-autumn system, a system imposed by the new leadership of the country which were in close ties with the Soviet Union.

== Team changes ==
=== To Divizia B ===
Promoted from Regional Championship

- Flacăra Poiana Câmpina
- Flamura Roșie Bacău
- Locomotiva Turnu Severin
- Metalul Oradea

Relegated from Divizia A

- Locomotiva București
- Știința Timișoara

=== From Divizia B ===
Relegated to Regional Championship

- Locomotiva Galați
- Locomotiva Sibiu
- Metalul Reșița

Promoted to Divizia A

- CSA Câmpulung Moldovenesc
- Metalul Câmpia Turzii

=== Renamed teams ===
CSA Cluj was renamed as CA Cluj.

CSA Craiova was renamed as CA Craiova.

Locomotiva București was renamed as Locomotiva GR București.

Locomotiva Satu Mare was renamed as Progresul Satu Mare.

Metalul Sibiu was renamed as Înainte Sibiu.

=== Other teams ===
Flacăra București was moved from Bucharest to Ploiești and renamed as Flacăra Ploiești. This move caused the disappearance of Flacăra Ploiești (former Prahova Ploiești) from the second league. The vacant place was occupied by Flacăra Lupeni, which was spared from relegation.

== League tables ==
=== Serie I ===
Pos	Team	Pld	W	D	L	GF	GA	GD	Pts	Promotion
1	Locomotiva GR București (C, P)	22	17	3	2	75	20	+55	37	Promotion to Divizia A
2	Locomotiva Iași	22	11	5	6	27	27	0	27	
3	Spartac București	22	11	2	9	38	37	+1	24	
4	Înainte Sibiu	22	9	5	8	41	34	+7	23	
5	Știința Iași	22	8	7	7	40	43	−3	23	
6	Metalul Steagul Roșu	22	8	6	8	47	33	+14	22	
7	Flamura Roșie Sfântu Gheorghe	22	10	2	10	31	26	+5	22	
8	Flacăra Moreni	22	9	3	10	29	25	+4	21	
9	Metalul București	22	9	3	10	39	40	−1	21	
10	Flamura Roșie Bacău	22	7	6	9	33	32	+1	20	
11	Flacăra Poiana Câmpina	22	7	5	10	33	32	+1	19	
12	Flamura Roșie Pitești	22	2	1	19	11	95	−84	5	

Source: romaniansoccer.ro
Rules for classification: 1) Points 2) Head-to-head points; 3) Head-to-head goal difference; 4) Head-to-head goals scored; 5) Head-to-head away goals scored; 6) Goal difference; 7) Goals scored.
(C) Champions; (P) Promoted

=== Serie II ===
Pos	Team	Pld	W	D	L	GF	GA	GD	Pts	Promotion
1	Știința Timișoara (C, P)	22	16	3	3	42	12	+30	35	Promotion to Divizia A
2	Flacăra Mediaș	22	11	7	4	32	17	+15	29	
3	Locomotiva Arad	22	6	11	5	25	21	+4	23	
4	Locomotiva Cluj	22	7	7	8	29	24	+5	21	
5	Locomotiva Oradea	22	8	5	9	22	22	0	21	
6	Metalul Baia Mare	22	7	7	8	29	32	−3	21	
7	Metalul Oradea	22	7	7	8	33	45	−12	21	
8	Locomotiva Turnu Severin	22	6	8	8	35	30	+5	20	
9	CA Cluj	22	8	4	10	23	21	+2	20	
10	Flacăra Lupeni	22	7	5	10	23	27	−4	19	
11	CA Craiova	22	8	3	11	25	35	−10	19	
12	Progresul Satu Mare	22	6	3	13	23	55	−32	15	

Source: romaniansoccer.ro
Rules for classification: 1) Points 2) Head-to-head points; 3) Head-to-head goal difference; 4) Head-to-head goals scored; 5) Head-to-head away goals scored; 6) Goal difference; 7) Goals scored.
(C) Champions; (P) Promoted

== See also ==
- 1952 Divizia A
- 1952 Regional Championship
- 1952 Cupa României
