= Steaua București league record by opponent =

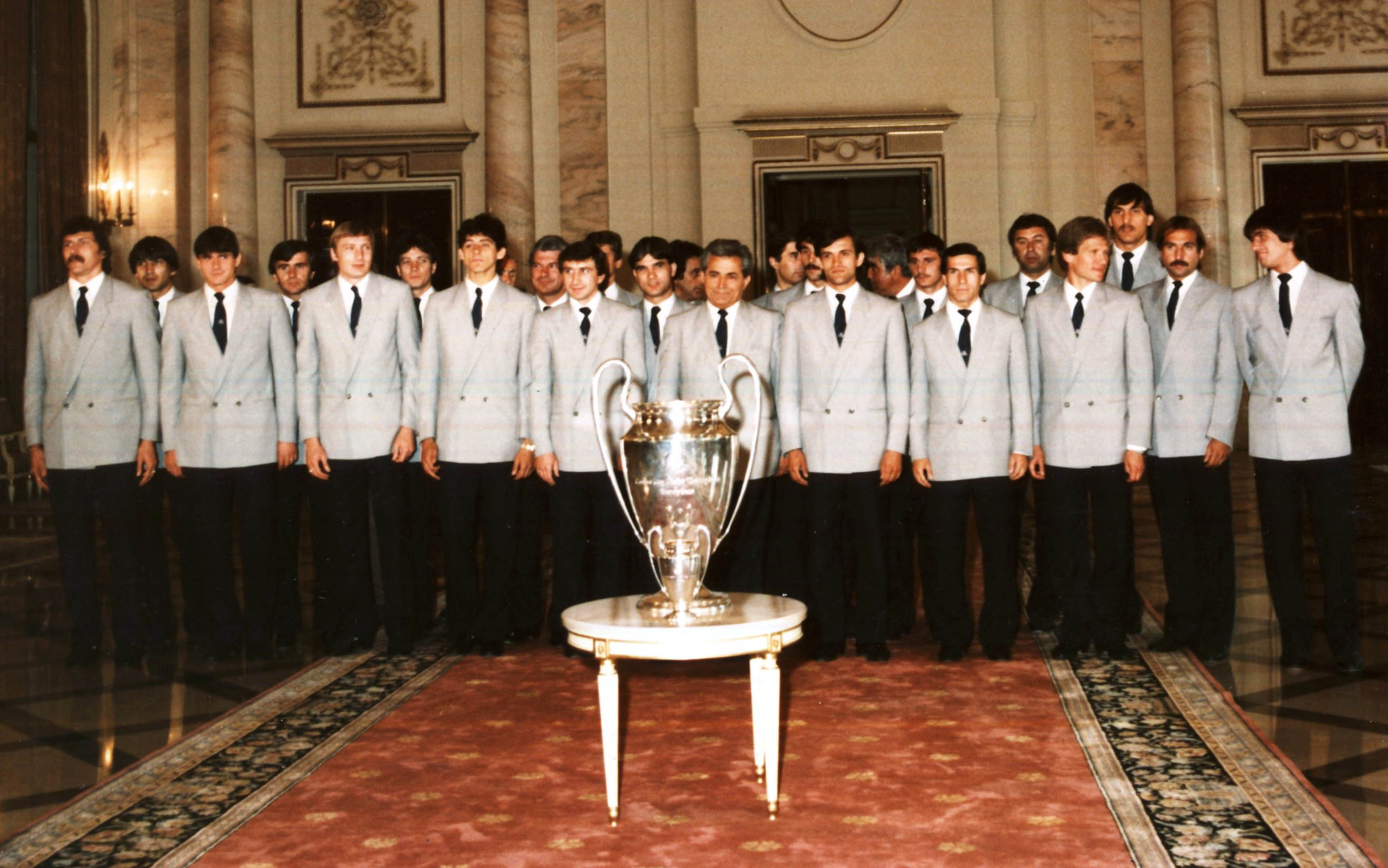
Steaua team in 1986

Steaua București is a Romanian professional association football club based in Bucharest. The club was formed in Bucharest in 1947 at the initiative of several officers of the Romanian Royal House as Asociația Sportivă a Armatei București, before being renamed as Clubul Sportiv Central al Armatei București in 1948. The club was renamed a third time in 1950 as Casa Centrală a Armatei București and in 1961 as Clubul Sportiv al Armatei Steaua București. The team name was changed last time in 1998 following lobbying from the football department president, Marcel Pușcaș, and new LPF regulations, the football club separated from CSA Steaua București and changed their name for the last time to Fotbal Club Steaua București

The team that Steaua have played most in league competition is Dinamo București, who they first met in the 1948–49 Divizia A season; the 45 defeats from 132 meetings is more than they have lost against any other club. Also, Dinamo have drawn 46 league encounters with Steaua, more than any other club. Steaua have recorded more league victories against Universitatea Cluj than against any other club, having beaten them 59 times out of 96 attempts.

On 9 March 2014 Steaua played their 2000 match in league against CFR Cluj, in a 1–0 away victory.

== All-time league record ==
Statistics correct as of matches played on season 2015–16.

Steaua league record by opponent
Club	P	W	D	L	F	A	P	W	D	L	F	A	P	W	D	L	F	A	Win%
Club	Home						Away						Total						Win%
Dermata Cluj	1	0	1	0	0	0	1	1	0	0	2	1	2	1	1	0	2	1	50.00
Ciocanul București	1	0	1	0	0	0	1	0	1	0	0	0	2	0	2	0	0	0	0.00
CFR Timișoara Locomotiva Timișoara	10	8	1	1	35	9	10	2	3	5	12	21	20	10	4	6	47	30	50.00
Universitatea Cluj CSU Cluj Știința Cluj	48	39	6	3	141	45	48	20	14	14	67	49	96	59	20	17	208	94	61.46
ITA Arad Flamura Roșie Arad UT Arad UTA Arad FCM UTA Arad	37	24	5	8	88	36	37	12	11	14	50	62	74	36	16	22	138	98	48.65
FC Ploiești (1922)	1	0	0	1	1	2	1	0	0	1	2	3	2	0	0	2	3	5	0.00
Locomotiva Sibiu	1	0	0	1	0	1	1	1	0	0	3	0	2	1	0	1	3	1	50.00
RATA Târgu Mureș Locomotiva Târgu Mureș CS Târgu Mureș	9	6	2	1	15	3	9	5	2	2	14	7	18	11	4	3	29	10	61.11
Oțelul Reșița Metalul Reșița CSM Reșița FCM Reșița	12	11	1	0	43	5	12	4	3	5	17	17	24	15	4	5	60	22	62.50
CSM Mediaș Gaz Metan Mediaș	10	8	1	1	23	2	10	5	3	2	17	14	20	13	4	3	40	16	65.00
CFR Ferar Cluj CFR Cluj	21	12	7	3	38	17	21	7	6	8	19	25	42	19	13	10	57	42	45.24
Jiul Petroșani Partizanul Petroșani Flacăra Petroșani Minerul Petroșani Energia Petroșani	39	33	3	3	111	24	39	11	18	10	46	45	78	44	21	13	157	69	56.41
Libertatea Oradea ICO Oradea Progresul Oradea CS Oradea Crișana Oradea	10	8	2	0	30	13	10	2	4	4	12	13	20	10	6	4	42	26	50.00
CFR București Locomotiva București Rapid București	56	23	21	12	80	49	56	19	20	17	91	82	112	42	41	29	171	131	37.50
Unirea Tricolor București Dinamo Brașov Dinamo Stalin Dinamo Cluj	8	5	3	0	18	5	8	5	2	1	18	14	16	10	5	1	36	19	62.50
CSU Timișoara Știința Timișoara Politehnica Timișoara Politehnica AEK Timișoara FCU Politehnica Timișoara Politehnica Știința 1921 Timișoara FC Timișoara	44	32	9	3	117	47	44	13	14	17	55	63	88	45	23	20	172	110	51.14
Distribuția București Petrolul București Partizanul București Flacăra București Flacăra Ploiești Energia Ploiești Petrolul Ploiești FC Ploiești	50	34	9	7	95	39	50	22	14	14	71	60	100	56	23	21	166	99	56.00
Dinamo București	68	24	24	20	98	85	68	17	23	28	86	94	136	41	49	46	184	179	30.15
Metalochimic București	1	0	1	0	2	2	1	1	0	0	7	2	2	1	1	0	9	4	50.00
Metalul Câmpia Turzii	2	1	1	0	5	2	2	2	0	0	6	2	4	3	1	0	11	4	75.00
CA Câmpulung Moldovenesc	1	1	0	0	3	1	2	1	0	1	4	3	3	2	0	1	7	4	66.67
Metalul Hunedoara Corvinul Hunedoara	17	16	1	0	58	9	17	7	5	5	27	22	34	23	6	5	85	31	67.65
Progresul București Progresul Finanțe Bănci București Progresul Vulcan București Național București	32	14	10	8	66	37	32	19	4	9	59	32	64	33	14	17	125	69	51.56
Avântul Reghin	1	1	0	0	7	1	1	1	0	0	9	1	2	2	0	0	16	2	100.00
Locomotiva Constanța FC Constanța Farul Constanța	42	30	10	2	101	37	42	17	7	18	58	48	84	47	17	20	159	85	55.95
Dinamo Bacău SC Bacău FC Bacău Selena Bacău AS Bacău FCM Bacău	42	36	2	4	110	32	42	16	14	12	53	40	84	52	16	16	163	72	61.90
Steagul Roșu Brașov FCM Brașov FC Brașov	46	30	11	5	102	37	46	16	14	16	58	53	92	46	25	21	160	90	50.00
Minerul Lupeni	4	3	0	1	12	5	4	2	1	1	4	3	8	5	1	2	16	8	62.50
CSMS Iași Politehnica Iași	28	22	4	2	61	21	28	10	10	8	40	33	56	32	14	10	101	54	57.14
Metalul Târgoviște CS Târgoviște Chindia Târgoviște	9	7	2	0	30	5	9	2	4	3	12	14	18	9	6	3	32	19	50.00
Dinamo Pitești Argeș Pitești	44	30	7	7	92	35	44	17	11	16	50	50	88	47	18	23	142	85	53.41
Viitorul București	1	1	0	0	4	2	0	0	0	0	0	0	1	1	0	0	4	2	100.00
Siderurgistul Galați	2	2	0	0	10	3	2	1	1	0	4	3	4	3	1	0	14	6	75.00
Crișul Oradea Bihor Oradea FC Oradea	18	12	4	2	47	15	18	11	2	5	37	26	36	23	6	7	84	41	63.89
Știința Craiova FC Universitatea Craiova	46	36	6	4	93	31	46	13	14	19	62	73	92	49	20	23	155	104	53.26
Minerul Baia Mare FC Baia Mare Maramureș Baia Mare	7	6	1	0	23	4	7	2	0	5	5	13	14	8	1	5	28	17	57.14
ASA Târgu Mureș (1962)	21	16	4	1	73	17	21	5	6	10	24	30	42	21	10	11	97	47	50.00
Vagonul Arad	1	1	0	0	3	0	1	1	0	0	5	1	2	2	0	0	8	1	100.00
Sportul Studențesc București	32	22	4	6	72	34	32	20	7	5	60	27	64	42	11	11	132	61	65.63
Olimpia Satu Mare	6	5	1	0	18	6	6	4	0	2	11	6	12	9	1	2	29	12	75.00
Chimia Râmnicu Vâlcea	10	9	1	0	30	8	10	3	1	6	12	9	20	12	2	6	42	17	60.00
FCM Galați Dunărea CSU Galați	5	4	1	0	21	6	5	1	3	1	5	6	10	5	4	1	26	12	50.00
Gloria Buzău	7	6	1	0	23	3	7	4	2	1	11	9	14	10	3	1	34	12	71.43
Olt Scornicești	11	10	1	0	35	4	11	7	0	4	17	9	22	17	1	4	52	13	77.27
Victoria București	5	5	0	0	17	4	5	4	1	0	12	1	10	9	1	0	29	5	90.00
Oțelul Galați	27	24	1	2	64	15	27	16	5	6	42	23	54	40	6	8	106	38	74.07
Flacăra Moreni	4	4	0	0	16	1	4	3	1	0	9	2	8	7	1	0	25	3	87.50
CSM Suceava	1	1	0	0	5	0	1	1	0	0	3	1	2	2	0	0	8	1	100.00
Inter Sibiu	8	8	0	0	24	5	8	4	3	1	10	4	16	12	3	1	34	9	75.00
FCM Progresul Brăila Dacia Unirea Brăila	4	4	0	0	17	1	4	2	2	0	9	4	8	6	2	0	26	5	75.00
Gloria Bistrița	22	17	4	1	45	14	22	11	4	7	29	24	44	28	8	8	74	38	63.64
Electroputere Craiova Extensiv Craiova	5	5	0	0	17	4	5	2	2	1	5	2	10	7	2	1	22	6	70.00
Ceahlăul Piatra Neamț	18	14	2	2	42	16	18	11	3	4	27	12	36	25	5	6	69	28	69.44
NC Foresta Suceava	3	3	0	0	11	3	3	2	1	0	5	2	6	5	1	0	16	5	83.33
FC Onești	2	2	0	0	7	1	2	2	0	0	6	3	4	4	0	0	13	4	100.00
Astra Ploiești Astra Giurgiu	13	9	2	2	20	8	13	2	4	7	10	19	26	11	6	9	30	27	42.31
Rocar București	2	1	1	0	3	2	2	2	0	0	7	5	4	3	1	0	10	7	75.00
UMT Timișoara	1	1	0	0	1	0	1	1	0	0	3	0	2	2	0	0	4	0	100.00
Apulum Alba Iulia Unirea Alba Iulia	3	3	0	0	9	1	3	0	2	1	2	3	6	3	2	1	11	4	50.00
Pandurii Târgu Jiu	12	7	4	1	19	6	12	4	6	2	11	9	24	11	10	3	30	15	45.83
FC Vaslui	9	4	3	2	11	8	9	4	1	4	11	7	18	8	4	6	22	15	44.44
Unirea Urziceni	5	4	0	1	10	1	5	1	2	2	5	6	10	5	2	3	15	7	50.00
Dacia Mioveni CS Mioveni	2	2	0	0	6	0	2	2	0	0	3	1	4	4	0	0	9	1	100.00
CS Otopeni	1	0	1	0	1	1	1	1	0	0	1	0	2	1	1	0	2	1	50.00
Internațional Curtea de Argeș	1	1	0	0	3	2	1	1	0	0	2	0	2	2	0	0	5	2	100.00
FCM Târgu Mureș ASA Târgu Mureș (2008)	5	3	1	1	6	3	5	2	1	2	6	4	10	5	2	3	12	7	50.00
Victoria Brănești	1	1	0	0	2	1	1	1	0	0	1	0	2	2	0	0	3	1	100.00
Concordia Chiajna	5	4	1	0	12	4	5	5	0	0	15	1	10	9	1	0	27	5	90.00
Voința Sibiu	1	1	0	0	1	0	1	0	1	0	1	1	2	1	1	0	2	1	50.00
CS Turnu Severin	1	1	0	0	2	1	1	0	1	0	1	1	2	1	1	0	3	2	50.00
Viitorul Constanța Viitorul	5	4	0	1	14	6	5	5	0	0	12	1	10	9	0	1	26	7	90.00
CSM Studențesc Iași	3	2	1	0	5	2	3	2	1	0	5	1	6	4	2	0	10	3	66.67
FC Botoșani	3	3	0	0	11	3	3	3	0	0	5	1	6	6	0	0	16	4	100.00
Corona Brașov	1	1	0	0	3	0	1	0	1	0	1	1	2	1	1	0	4	1	50.00
ACS Poli Timișoara	2	2	0	0	6	1	2	0	1	1	0	1	4	2	1	1	6	2	50.00
Săgeata Năvodari	1	1	0	0	5	0	1	1	0	0	2	1	2	2	0	0	7	1	100.00
CS Universitatea Craiova	2	2	0	0	5	1	2	1	1	0	2	1	4	3	1	0	7	2	75.00
FC Voluntari	1	1	0	0	3	1	1	0	0	1	1	3	2	1	0	1	4	4	50.00
Total	1041	724	200	117	2457	855	1041	425	289	327	1486	1230	2,082	1,149	489	444	3,943	2,085	55.19
