= Justin Apostol =

Romanian footballer (1921–1991)

Personal information
- Date of birth: 14 September 1921
- Place of birth: Galați, Romania
- Date of death: 31 January 1991 (aged 69)
- Position: Goalkeeper

Youth career
- 1931–1933: Fulgerul CFR Galați

Senior career*
Years	Team	Apps	(Gls)
1933–1944	Gloria CFR Galați (Note: The 1940–41 Divizia A was the last season before World War II and the 1946–47 Divizia A was the first one after, so the appearances and goals scored during this period for Gloria CFR Galați are not official, also the statistics for the 1937–38 and 1938–39 Divizia B seasons are unavailable.)	45	(1)
1946–1947	ITA Arad	10	(0)
1947	Jiul Petroșani	1	(0)
1948–1949	CFR București	23	(0)
1950–1952	Locomotiva Galați		
Total		79	(1)

International career
1940–1948	Romania	3	(0)
- * Club domestic league appearances and goals

Justin Apostol (14 September 1921 – 31 January 1991) was a Romanian footballer who played as a goalkeeper.

== Club career ==
Apostol was born on 14 September 1921 in Galați, Romania and began playing junior-level football in 1931 at local club Fulgerul CFR. In 1937, he began playing for Gloria CFR's senior squad in Divizia B. Subsequently, he helped the team gain first-league promotion at the end of the 1938–39 season. Apostol made his Divizia A debut on 27 August 1939 under coach Carol Weszter in a 6–0 away loss to Rapid București. On 8 October, he scored a goal from a penalty in a 6–2 loss to Venus București. In 1946, Apostol joined ITA Arad where he played 10 games in his single season as the club won its first title. Afterwards, he went to play for Jiul Petroșani. However, after making only one league appearance, Apostol moved to CFR București. There, on 10 July 1949, he made his last Divizia A appearance in a 3–1 loss to ITA Arad, totaling 79 matches with one goal in the competition. Apostol spent his final professional years at Locomotiva Galați, where he retired in 1952.

== International career ==
Apostol played three games for Romania, making his debut under coach Virgil Economu on 31 March 1940 in a 3–3 friendly draw against Yugoslavia. Subsequently, he made two appearances during the 1948 Balkan Cup which were a 0–0 draw against Poland and a 5–1 loss to rivals Hungary.

== Death ==
Apostol died on 31 January 1991 at age 69.

== Honours ==
Gloria CFR Galați

- Divizia B: 1938–39

UTA Arad

- Divizia A: 1946–47
