= 1952 Regional Championship =

11th season of the Liga IV, the fourth tier of the Romanian football league

Liga IV
- Season: 1952

The 1952 Regional Championship was the 11th season of the Regional Championship, 2nd as the third tier of Romanian football.

Thirty-two teams was participate at the promotion play-off to 1953 Divizia B, twenty-eight regional champions and four city champions teams (Galați, București, Timișoara and Stalin), one from each geographical group.

The thirty-two teams were divided into four groups of eight each, based on geographical criteria. The play-off was played in eliminatory rounds over two-legs and the fixtures ending in a tie was replayed in a third game on neutral grounds.

The winners of each groups were promoted. However, after the end of the season, the Romanian Football Federation decided to increase the number of promoted teams, as the two series of the second division was expanded from 12 to 16, and the third round losers were promoted as well.

== Regional championships ==
East

- Bacău (BC)
- Bârlad (BD)
- Botoșani (BT)
- Galați (GL)
- Iași (IS)
- Putna (PT)
- Suceava (SV)

South

- Argeș (AG)
- Bucharest (B)
- Buzău (BZ)
- Constanța (CT)
- Ialomița (IL)
- Ploiești (PL)
- Teleorman (TR)

West

- Arad (AR)
- Dolj (CJ)
- Gorj (GJ)
- Hunedoara (HD)
- Severin (SR)
- Timișoara (TM)
- Vâlcea (VL)

North

- Baia Mare (BM)
- Bihor (BH)
- Cluj (CJ)
- Mureș (MS)
- Rodna (RD)
- Sibiu (SB)
- Stalin (ST)

== Promotion play-off ==
=== First round ===
The matches was played on 12, 19, 23 October and 9 November 1952.

Team 1	Series	Team 2	Game 1	Game 2	Game 3
Region 1 (East)					
Dinamo Bacău (BC)	8–1	(SV) Știința Câmpulung Moldovenesc	4–0	4–1	
Locomotiva Galați (GL)	6–0 (Note: The initial results of the match, Locomotiva Galați – Vulturii MFA Focșani 0–0 and 1–1 was reversed both 3–0 following an appeal of the team from Galați.)	(PT) Vulturii MFA Focșani	3–0	3–0	
Locomotiva Pașcani (IS)	8–0	(BT) Dinamo 3 Dorohoi	5–0	3–0	
Dinamo Bârlad (BD)	1–6	(GL) Metalul Brăila	1–1	0–5	
Region 2 (South)					
Progresul Găești (AG)	3–6	(TR) Dinamo Turnu Măgurele	1–0	2–6	
Șantierul Constanța (CT)	9–6	(PL) Flacăra Târgoviște	4–3	2–3	3–0 (Note: The match was played on 23 October 1952 at București.)
Spartac Giurgiu (B)	4–3	(IL) Dinamo Călărași	1–3	3–0 (Note: The initial result of the match, Dinamo Călărași – Spartac Giurgiu 1–0, was reversed 0–3 following an appeal of the team from Giurgiu.)	
Spartac Râmnicu Sărat (BZ)	1–5	(B) Dinamo 8 București	1–1	0–4	
Region 3 (West)					
Metalul Reșița (SR)	7–1	(TM) Progresul Timișoara	6–0	1–1	
Progresul Târgu Jiu (GJ)	0–9	(SB) Avântul Sebeș	0–5	0–4	
Locomotiva Craiova (DJ)	6–1	(VL) Progresul Râmnicu Vâlcea	6–0	0–1	
Șantierul Lugoj (TM)	2–5	(AR) Metalul Arad	0–3	2–2 (Note: The match was played on 9 November 1952.)	
Region 4 (North)					
Progresul Bistrița (RD)	0–5	(BM) Avântul Sighetu Marmației	0–3 (Note: The initial result of the match, 3–1, was reversed 0–3 following an appeal of the team from Sighetu Marmației.)	0–2	
Avântul Reghin (MS)	4–3	(ST) Progresul Orașul Stalin	4–1	0–2	
Metalul Hunedoara (HD)	4–1	(ST) Avântul Codlea	2–0	2–1	
Spartac Salonta (BH)	5–6	(CJ) Flamura Roșie Turda	2–0	1–3	2–3 (Note: The match was played on 23 October 1952 at Deva.)

=== Second round ===
The matches was played on 2, 9, 13, 16 and 20 November 1952.

Team 1	Series	Team 2	Game 1	Game 2	Game 3
Region 1 (East)					
Dinamo Bacău (BC)	3–1	(GL) Locomotiva Galați	2–0 (Note: The match was played on 2 November 1952.)	1–1 (Note: The match was played on 9 November 1952.)	
Metalul Brăila (GL)	2–0	(IS) Locomotiva Pașcani	1–0	1–0	
Region 2 (South)					
Spartac Giurgiu (B)	1–5	(TR) Dinamo Turnu Măgurele	1–1 (Note: The match was played on 16 November 1952.)	0–4 (Note: The match was played on 19 November 1952.)	
Dinamo 8 București (B)	1–2	(CT) Șantierul Constanța	1–0	0–2	
Region 3 (West)					
Avântul Sebeș (SB)	2–4	(SR) Metalul Reșița	2–2	0–2	
Metalul Arad (AR)	1–3	(DJ) Locomotiva Craiova	1–1 (Note: The match was played on 13 November 1952.)	0–0 (Note: The match was played on 20 November 1952.)	0–2 (Note: The match was played on 23 November 1952 at București.)
Region 4 (North)					
Avântul Reghin (MS)	5–4	(BM) Avântul Sighetu Marmației	3–1	2–3	
Flamura Roșie Turda (CJ)	2–3	(HD) Metalul Hunedoara	2–2	0–1	

=== Third round ===
The matches was played on 16 November, 4 and 5 December 1952.

Team 1	Series	Team 2	Game 1	Game 2	Game 3
Region 1 (East)					
Metalul Brăila (GL)	5–6	(BC) Dinamo Bacău	2–2 (Note: The match was played on 16 November 1952.)	1–1	2–3 (Note: The match was played on 5 December 1952.)
Region 2 (South)					
Dinamo Turnu Măgurele (TR)	0–2	(CT) Șantierul Constanța	0–2	0–0 (Note: The match was played on 4 December 1952.)	
Region 3 (West)					
Locomotiva Craiova (DJ)	2–3	(SR) Metalul Reșița	2–1	0–2	
Region 4 (North)					
Avântul Reghin (MS)	6–2	(HD) Metalul Hunedoara	5–1	1–1 (Note: The initial match played at Hunedoara, 2–0 for Metalul, was canceled and replayed on 4 December 1952 at București.)	

== See also ==
- 1952 Divizia A
- 1952 Divizia B
- 1952 Cupa României
