= 1951 Regional Championship =

10th season of the Liga IV, the fourth tier of the Romanian football league

Liga IV
- Season: 1951

The 1951 Regional Championship was the 10th season of the Regional Championship, 1st as the third tier of Romanian football.

Twenty-eight regional champion teams participated at the promotion play-off to 1952 Divizia B.

The twenty-eight teams were divided into four groups of seven each, based on geographical criteria, with one team received a bye to second round.

The promotion play-off was played in eliminatory rounds over two-legs and the fixtures ending in a tie was replayed in a third game on neutral grounds. The winners of each groups were promoted.

== Regional championships ==
East

- Bacău (BC)
- Bârlad (BD)
- Botoșani (BT)
- Galați (GL)
- Iași (IS)
- Putna (PT)
- Suceava (SV)

South

- Argeș (AG)
- Bucharest (B)
- Buzău (BZ)
- Constanța (CT)
- Ialomița (IL)
- Ploiești (PL)
- Teleorman (TR)

West

- Arad (AR)
- Dolj (CJ)
- Gorj (GJ)
- Hunedoara (HD)
- Severin (SR)
- Timișoara (TM)
- Vâlcea (VL)

North

- Baia Mare (BM)
- Bihor (BH)
- Cluj (CJ)
- Mureș (MS)
- Rodna (RD)
- Sibiu (SB)
- Stalin (ST)

== Promotion play-off ==
=== First round ===
The matches was played on 7 and 14 October 1951.

Team 1	Series	Team 2	Game 1	Game 2	Game 3
Region 1 (East)					
Flamura Roșie Botoșani (BT)	2–14	(SV) Dinamo Fălticeni	1–6	1–8	
Dinamo Iași (IS)	5–8	(BC) Flamura Roșie Bacău	3–6	2–2	
Dinamo Bârlad (BD)	1–4	(PT) CSA Tecuci	1–1	0–3	
Region 2 (South)					
Spartac Curtea de Argeș (AG)	2–5	(PL) Flacăra Poiana Câmpina	2–1	0–4	
Locomotiva PCA Constanța (CT)	6–2	(IL) Dinamo Călărași ||2–2||4–0			
Dinamo 8 București (B)	6–2	(TR) Spartac Turnu Măgurele ||6–0||0–2			
Region 3 (West)					
Progresul Râmnicu Vâlcea (VL)	2–5	(DJ) Locomotiva Craiova	2–3	0–2	
Locomotiva Turnu Severin (GJ)	3–2	(HD) Metalul Hunedoara ||3–2||0–0			
Flacăra Anina (SR)	1–4	(TM) Metalul Timișoara	1–2	0–2	
Region 4 (North)					
Metalul Oradea (BH)	9–3	(BM) Metalul Satu Mare ||7–2||2–1			
Progresul Bistrița (RD)	0–4	(MS) Avântul Reghin	0–1	0–3	
Metalul Făgăraș (SB)	7–4	(ST) Locomotiva Orașul Stalin ||5–0||2–4			

=== Second round ===
The matches was played on 21 and 28 October 1951.

Team 1	Series	Team 2	Game 1	Game 2	Game 3
Region 1 (East)					
Flamura Roșie Bacău (BC)	4–2	(SV) Dinamo Fălticeni	2–1	2–1	
Metalul Brăila (GL)	1–0	(PT) CSA Tecuci	1–0	0–0	
Region 2 (South)					
Dinamo 8 București (B)	7–3	(BZ) Spartac Buzău	1–3	6–0	
Locomotiva PCA Constanța (CT)	3–5	(PL) Flacăra Poiana Câmpina	3–1	0–2	0–2 (Note: The match was played on 1 November 1951 on neutral ground at Spartac BRPR Stadium in București.)
Region 3 (West)					
Locomotiva Turnu Severin (GJ)	5–2	(DJ) Locomotiva Craiova	1–2	4–0	
Constructorul Arad (AR)	4–3	(TM) Metalul Timișoara	3–2	1–1	
Region 4 (North)					
Metalul Oradea (BH)	4–2	(MS) Avântul Reghin	4–0	0–2	
Flamura Roșie Cluj (CJ)	6–2	(SB) Metalul Făgăraș	5–0	1–2	

=== Third round ===
The matches was played on 4 and 11 November 1951.

Team 1	Series	Team 2	Game 1	Game 2	Game 3
Region 1 (East)					
Flamura Roșie Bacău (BC)	4–3	(GL) Metalul Brăila	2–0	0–2	2–1
Region 2 (South)					
Dinamo 8 București (B)	2–5	(PL) Flacăra Poiana Câmpina	2–0	0–5	
Region 3 (West)					
Locomotiva Turnu Severin (GJ)	3–1	(AR) Constructorul Arad	1–0	2–1	
Region 4 (North)					
Metalul Oradea (BH)	2–1	(CJ) Flamura Roșie Cluj	0–1	2–0	

== Championships standings ==
=== Ploiești Region ===
Pos	Team	Pld	W	D	L	GF	GA	GD	Pts	Qualification or relegation
1	Flacăra Poiana Câmpina (Q)	14	10	2	2	46	11	+35	22	Qualification to promotion play-off
2	Partizanul Rafinăria Teleajen	14	8	3	3	36	19	+17	19	
3	Partizanul Târgoviște	14	7	1	6	31	24	+7	15	
4	Partizanul Uzina Moreni	14	6	2	6	32	27	+5	14	
5	Metalul Banloc Florești	14	5	3	6	29	26	+3	13	
6	Constructorul Fieni	14	5	2	7	19	28	−9	12	
7	Partizanul AC Câmpina	14	4	2	8	18	34	−16	10	
8	Partizanul Minerul Filipeștii de Pădure	14	1	5	8	11	53	−42	7	

Rules for classification: 1) points; 2) goal difference; 3) number of goals scored.
(Q) Qualified for the phase indicated

== See also ==
- 1951 Divizia A
- 1951 Divizia B
- 1951 Cupa României
