= 1936–37 Divizia C =

Third tier Romanian football league

Divizia C
- Season: 1936–37

The 1936–37 Divizia C was the first season of the third tier league of the Romanian football league system. The league was divided in five parallel divisions, based on geographical criteria. The winner of each division earned promotion to the next season of Divizia B.

== North League ==
=== Seria I ===
Pos	Team	Pld	W	D	L	GF	GA	GD	Pts	Promotion or relegation
1	Tricolor Baia Mare (Q)	10	9	1	0	58	10	+48	19	Qualification to North League Final
2	Barkohba Satu Mare	10	5	2	3	12	13	−1	12	
3	CS Salonta	10	4	2	4	22	23	−1	10	
4	Vestul Oradea	10	4	2	4	15	27	−12	10	
5	Maramureș Sighet	10	2	1	7	9	34	−25	5	
6	CFR Oradea	10	2	0	8	19	28	−9	4	

Source: romaniansoccer.ro
(Q) Qualified for the phase indicated

=== Seria II ===
Pos	Team	Pld	W	D	L	GF	GA	GD	Pts	Promotion or relegation
1	Ceramica Bistrița (Q)	10	5	4	1	26	17	+9	14	Qualification to North League Final
2	CFR Cluj	10	3	6	1	12	10	+2	12	
3	CA Cluj	10	2	7	1	15	12	+3	11	
4	Uzinele Electrice Cluj	10	2	5	3	13	15	−2	9	
5	Industria Sârmei Câmpia Turzii	10	2	4	4	12	16	−4	8	
6	Arieșul Turda	10	1	4	5	16	24	−8	6	

Source: romaniansoccer.ro
(Q) Qualified for the phase indicated

=== North League Final ===
Team 1	Agg.	Team 2	1st leg	2nd leg
Ceramica Bistrița	0–2	Tricolor Baia Mare	0–0	0–2

Tricolor Baia Mare promoted to Divizia B

== South League ==
=== Seria I ===
Pos	Team	Pld	W	D	L	GF	GA	GD	Pts	Promotion or relegation
1	Telefon Club București (Q)	10	10	0	0	56	11	+45	20	Qualification to South League Final
2	Oltul Turnu Măgurele	10	5	2	3	20	16	+4	12	
3	Turda București	10	4	2	4	23	27	−4	10	
4	Venus Câmpina	10	4	1	5	18	26	−8	9	
5	Tricolor Venus Călărași	10	2	1	7	25	40	−15	5	
6	Radu Negru CFR Pitești	10	1	2	7	16	38	−22	4	

Source: romaniansoccer.ro
(Q) Qualified for the phase indicated

=== Seria II ===
Pos	Team	Pld	W	D	L	GF	GA	GD	Pts	Promotion or relegation
1	Gloria CFR Galați (Q)	9	7	2	0	23	6	+17	16	Qualification to South League Final
2	VTM Brăila	9	5	0	4	24	21	+3	10	
3	Prahova Ploiești	5	3	1	1	18	9	+9	7	
4	Avântul Buzău	9	3	1	5	16	18	−2	7	
5	Marina Constanța	9	2	1	6	17	23	−6	5	
6	Gloria Venera Bazargic	9	2	1	6	13	34	−21	5	

Source: romaniansoccer.ro
(Q) Qualified for the phase indicated

=== South League Final ===
Team 1	Series	Team 2	Game 1	Game 2	Game 3
Telefon Club București	0–2	Gloria CFR Galați	1–2	1–0	2–1

Telefon Club București promoted to Divizia B

== West League ==
Pos	Team	Pld	W	D	L	GF	GA	GD	Pts	Promotion or relegation
1	UDR Reșița (C, P)	18	17	1	0	62	8	+54	35	Promotion to Divizia B
2	Minerul Lupeni	18	13	0	5	31	21	+10	26	
3	SSMR Reșița	18	11	2	5	39	20	+19	24	
4	Mica Brad	18	9	1	8	28	35	−7	19	
5	Electrica Timișoara	18	7	4	7	35	31	+4	18	
6	Progresul Timișoara	18	7	3	8	44	33	+11	17	
7	Banatul Timișoara	18	7	3	8	28	25	+3	17	
8	CSM Lugoj	18	6	2	10	20	41	−21	14	
9	Olimpia PTT Arad	18	3	0	15	30	66	−36	6	
10	Politehnica Timișoara	18	1	2	15	11	48	−37	4	
11	CFR Turnu Severin (D)	0	0	0	0	0	0	0	0 (Note: CFR Turnu Severin retired from championship on 26 April 1937 and its results was canceled.)	Expelled
12	Fulgerul CFR Craiova (D)	0	0	0	0	0	0	0	0 (Note: Fulgerul CFR Craiova retired from championship in March 1937 and its results was canceled.)	Expelled

Source: romaniansoccer.ro
(C) Champions; (D) Disqualified; (P) Promoted

== Central League ==
Pos	Team	Pld	W	D	L	GF	GA	GD	Pts	Promotion or relegation
1	SG Sibiu (C, P)	20	15	2	3	53	24	+29	32	Promotion to Divizia B
2	Sparta Mediaș	20	10	6	4	43	22	+21	26	
3	CS Târgu Mureș	20	10	5	5	53	32	+21	25	
4	Vitrometan Mediaș	20	10	4	6	37	28	+9	24	
5	Brașovia Brașov	20	11	1	8	47	25	+22	23	
6	SS Sibiu	20	9	2	9	23	39	−16	20	
7	Klinger Sfântu Gheorghe	20	8	3	9	28	31	−3	19	
8	Patria Diciosânmartin	20	8	2	10	35	30	+5	18	
9	Acvila CFR Sighișoara	20	6	1	13	30	63	−33	13	
10	Fraternitas Tălmaciu	20	5	3	12	36	53	−17	13	
11	CS Blaj	20	3	1	16	28	66	−38	7	
12	BMTE Brașov (D)	0	0	0	0	0	0	0	0 (Note: BMTE Brașov retired from championship after 9 May 1937 and its results was canceled.)	Expelled

Source: romaniansoccer.ro
(C) Champions; (D) Disqualified; (P) Promoted

== East League ==
Pos	Team	Pld	W	D	L	GF	GA	GD	Pts	Promotion or relegation
1	Hatmanul Luca Arbore Rădăuți (C, P)	12	8	1	3	29	18	+11	17	Promotion to Divizia B
2	Stadiul CFR Bacău	12	7	3	2	35	15	+20	17	
3	Macabi Chișinău	12	7	2	3	19	17	+2	16	
4	Dovbuș Cernăuți	12	6	1	5	28	24	+4	13	
5	Victoria CFR Iași	12	4	2	6	20	23	−3	10	
6	Traian Tighina	12	4	1	7	16	28	−12	9	
7	Cetatea Sucevei Suceava	12	1	0	11	10	32	−22	2	

Source: romaniansoccer.ro
(C) Champions; (P) Promoted

== See also ==
- 1936–37 Divizia A
- 1936–37 Divizia B
