= 1951 Divizia B =

12th season of the Divizia B, the second tier of the Romanian football league

Divizia B
- Season: 1951
- Promoted: CSA Câmpulung Moldovenesc; Metalul Câmpia Turzii
- Relegated: Locomotiva Galați; Flacăra Lupeni; Locomotiva Sibiu; Metalul Reșița

The 1951 Divizia B was the 12th season of the second tier of the Romanian football league system.

The format with two series has been maintained, each of them having 12 teams. At the end of the season the winners of the series promoted to Divizia A and the last two places from each one of the series relegated to District Championship. Also this was the second season played in the spring-autumn system, a system imposed by the new leadership of the country which were in close ties with the Soviet Union.

== Team changes ==
=== To Divizia B ===
Promoted from Regional Championship

- CSA Câmpulung Moldovenesc
- CSA Craiova
- Metalul Sibiu
- Metalul Steagul Roșu

Relegated from Divizia A

- Metalul Reșița
- Locomotiva Sibiu

=== From Divizia B ===
Relegated to Regional Championship

- Progresul ICAS București
- Metalul Oțelu Roșu
- Flamura Roșie Bacău
- Metalul Brad

Promoted to Divizia A

- Dinamo Orașul Stalin
- Știința Cluj

=== Renamed teams ===
Armata Cluj was renamed as CSA Cluj.

Partizanul Lupeni was renamed as Flacăra Lupeni.

Partizanul Mediaș was renamed as Flacăra Mediaș.

Partizanul Moreni was renamed as Flacăra Moreni.

Partizanul Ploiești was renamed as Flacăra Ploiești.

== League tables ==
=== Serie I ===
| Pos | Team | Pld | W | D | L | GF | GA | GD | Pts | Promotion or relegation |
|---|---|---|---|---|---|---|---|---|---|---|
| 1 | CSA Câmpulung Moldovenesc (C, P) | 22 | 16 | 3 | 3 | 57 | 20 | +37 | 35 | Promotion to Divizia A |
| 2 | Flacăra Moreni | 22 | 12 | 2 | 8 | 38 | 35 | +3 | 26 | |
| 3 | Flacăra Ploiești | 22 | 11 | 3 | 8 | 52 | 35 | +17 | 25 | |
| 4 | Metalul Steagul Roșu | 22 | 10 | 4 | 8 | 34 | 25 | +9 | 24 | |
| 5 | Metalul București | 22 | 9 | 3 | 10 | 41 | 40 | +1 | 21 | |
| 6 | Știința Iași | 22 | 8 | 5 | 9 | 31 | 30 | +1 | 21 | |
| 7 | Spartac București | 22 | 9 | 2 | 11 | 37 | 38 | −1 | 20 | |
| 8 | Flamura Roșie Sfântu Gheorghe | 22 | 9 | 2 | 11 | 35 | 39 | −4 | 20 | |
| 9 | Locomotiva Iași | 22 | 8 | 4 | 10 | 27 | 37 | −10 | 20 | |
| 10 | Flamura Roșie Pitești | 22 | 8 | 4 | 10 | 24 | 45 | −21 | 20 | |
| 11 | Locomotiva Galați (R) | 22 | 8 | 3 | 11 | 36 | 38 | −2 | 19 | Relegation to Regional Championship |
| 12 | Locomotiva Sibiu (R) | 22 | 5 | 3 | 14 | 23 | 53 | −30 | 13 | Relegation to Regional Championship |

Source: romaniansoccer.ro
Rules for classification: 1) Points 2) Head-to-head points; 3) Head-to-head goal difference; 4) Head-to-head goals scored; 5) Head-to-head away goals scored; 6) Goal difference; 7) Goals scored.
(C) Champions; (P) Promoted; (R) Relegated

=== Serie II ===
| Pos | Team | Pld | W | D | L | GF | GA | GD | Pts | Promotion or relegation |
|---|---|---|---|---|---|---|---|---|---|---|
| 1 | Metalul Câmpia Turzii (C, P) | 22 | 11 | 8 | 3 | 41 | 21 | +20 | 30 | Promotion to Divizia A |
| 2 | Metalul Sibiu | 22 | 11 | 6 | 5 | 41 | 30 | +11 | 28 | |
| 3 | Flacăra Mediaș | 22 | 10 | 7 | 5 | 36 | 22 | +14 | 27 | |
| 4 | Metalul Baia Mare | 22 | 10 | 5 | 7 | 29 | 25 | +4 | 25 | |
| 5 | Locomotiva Satu Mare | 22 | 11 | 2 | 9 | 31 | 35 | −4 | 24 | |
| 6 | Locomotiva Cluj | 22 | 9 | 5 | 8 | 37 | 31 | +6 | 23 | |
| 7 | Locomotiva Oradea | 22 | 10 | 3 | 9 | 29 | 33 | −4 | 23 | |
| 8 | CSA Craiova | 22 | 10 | 2 | 10 | 39 | 36 | +3 | 22 | |
| 9 | CSA Cluj | 22 | 7 | 6 | 9 | 31 | 29 | +2 | 20 | |
| 10 | Locomotiva Arad | 22 | 7 | 5 | 10 | 30 | 31 | −1 | 19 | |
| 11 | Flacăra Lupeni (R) | 22 | 6 | 7 | 9 | 24 | 29 | −5 | 19 | Relegation to Regional Championship |
| 12 | Metalul Reșița (R) | 22 | 2 | 0 | 20 | 13 | 59 | −46 | 4 | Relegation to Regional Championship |

Source: romaniansoccer.ro
Rules for classification: 1) Points 2) Head-to-head points; 3) Head-to-head goal difference; 4) Head-to-head goals scored; 5) Head-to-head away goals scored; 6) Goal difference; 7) Goals scored.
(C) Champions; (P) Promoted; (R) Relegated

== See also ==
- 1951 Divizia A
- 1951 Regional Championship
- 1951 Cupa României
