= Stadionul Municipal (Reghin) =

Multi-use stadium in Reghin, Romania

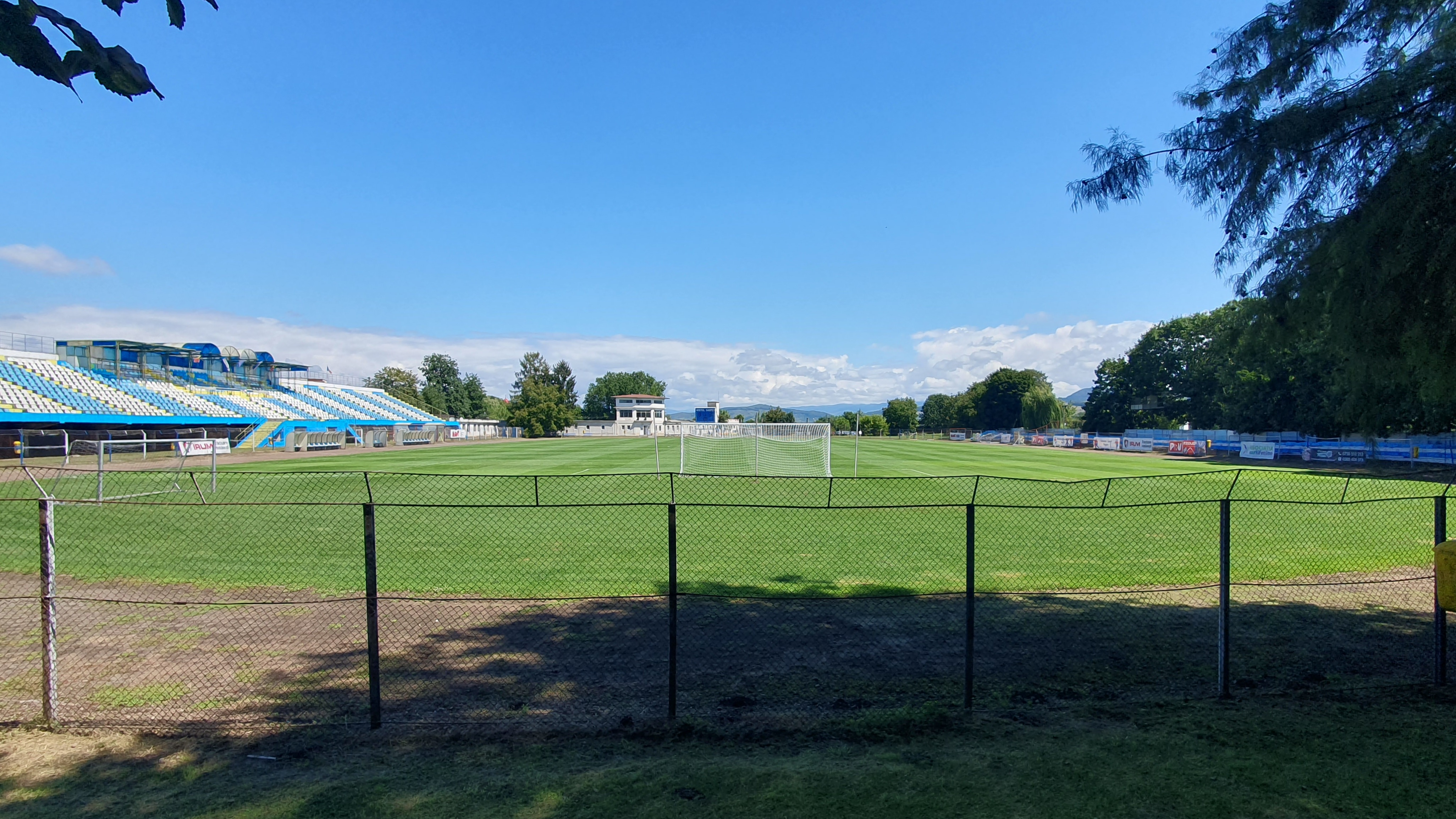
- Interactive map of Stadionul Municipal
- Address: Str. Băii
- Location: Reghin, Romania
- Coordinates: 46°46′51″N 24°42′36.8″E
- Owner: Municipality of Reghin
- Operator: Avântul Reghin; Viitorul Reghin
- Capacity: 5,400 (3,200 seated)
- Surface: Grass

Construction
- Opened: 1940s
- Renovated: 2007

Tenants
- Avântul Reghin (1949–present); Gloria Bistrița (2008); Viitorul Reghin (2011–present)

Stadionul Municipal is a multi-use stadium in Reghin, Romania. It is the home ground of Avântul Reghin and Viitorul Reghin. In the present after some modification it holds 2063 seats in the main stand, from which 191 are roofed seats (including 2 x 2 commentators cabine). The seats are white (1093) and blue (970). In the 1980s the maximum capacity was around 5,000 people on wooden benches, from which around 1000 in the second stand.
