= FC Bârlad =

- Full name: Fotbal Club Bârlad
- Nickname(s): Bârlădenii (The People from Bârlăd)
- Short name: Bârlad
- Founded: 1951 as Dinamo Bârlad
- Dissolved: 2009
- Ground: Stadionul Fepa 74
- Capacity: 2,000

Fotbal Club Bârlad, commonly known as FC Bârlad, was a Romanian professional football club from Bârlad, Vaslui County, founded in 1951 and dissolved in 2009.

== History ==
The team was founded in 1951 as Dinamo Bârlad, being one of the subsidiary teams of Dinamo București under the tutelage of Miliția, and played in Bârlad Regional Championship. Dinamo won twice the regional championship, in 1951 and 1952 seasons, but lost every time the promotion to second division. In 1954, the second division team Dinamo Turnu Măgurele was moved to Bârlad and was absorbed into Dinamo Bârlad.

The team played the next seasons in Divizia B, in which was ranked 8th (1954 and 1955), 10th (1956) and 6th (1957–58). Also, Dinamo reached the first round proper of Cupa României in 1955 season, losing 0–2 in front of Flacăra Ploiești. The lineup was composed of: Pahonțu – Fekete, Malinovski, Fiam – Apostolache, Bencze – Ionescu, Slumski, Iacob, Ciungu and Cioboată.

In 1958, the club was taken over by the Bârlad Bearings Enterprise (Întreprinderea de Rulmenți Bârlad) and was renamed as Rulmentul Bârlad. Followed three more seasons in Divizia B finishing 10th (1958–59), 12th (1959–60) and 14th (1960–61), relegating after seven years in the second division.

In 2007, Bârlădenii won the Liga IV – Vaslui County and promoted to Liga III after a promotion play-off against champions of Liga IV – Botoșani County, Avântul Albești (2–0 at Pașcani).

== Ground ==
The club played its home matches on Fepa 74 Stadium in Bârlad, with a capacity of 2,000 people.

== Honours ==
Liga IV – Vaslui County

- Winners (4): 1990–91, 1992–93, 1996–97, 2006–07

== Former players ==
- (Romania) Bogdan Ghiceanu
- (Romania) Sorin Ungurianu
- (Romania) Alin Abuzătoaie
- (Romania) Ionuț Plăcintă

== Former managers ==
- (Romania) Costinel Botez

== League history ==
| Season | Tier | Division | Place | Notes | Cupa României |
|---|---|---|---|---|---|
| 2008–09 | 3 | Liga III (Seriae I) | 17th | Relegated | |
| 2007–08 | 3 | Liga III (Seria I) | 6th | | |

| Season | Tier | Division | Place | Notes | Cupa României |
|---|---|---|---|---|---|
| 2006–07 | 4 | Liga IV (VS) | 1st (C) | Promoted | |
| 2005–06 | 3 | Liga III (Seria I) | 10th | Relegated | |
