= 1948–49 Divizia B =

Divizia B
- Season: 1948–49
- Promoted: CFR Sibiu; Metalochimic Reșița
- Relegated: Arsenal Sibiu; Dermata Cluj; CFR Ploiești; CFR Turnu Severin; Grivița CFR București; Solvay Uioara; Dezrobirea Constanța; CAM Timișoara; FC Călărași; Șurianul Sebeș

The 1948–49 Divizia B was the 10th season of the second tier of the Romanian football league system.

The format was changed from four series of 16 teams to two series, each one of them having 14 teams. At the end of the season the winners of the series has been promoted in the Divizia A and the last five teams from the each series relegated to Divizia C.

== Team changes ==
=== To Divizia B ===
Promoted from Divizia C

- —

Relegated from Divizia A

- Dermata Cluj
- Ploiești
- Dinamo B București
- UD Reșița

=== From Divizia B ===
Relegated to Divizia C

- Stăruința Satu Mare
- Electrica Timișoara
- BNR București
- CFR Târgoviște
- Ripensia Timișoara
- Sticla Târnăveni
- CFR Caracal
- Textila Buhuși
- CFR Arad
- CFR Simeria
- CFR Buzău
- CFR Iași
- UF Hunedoara
- Minaur Baia Mare
- Craiova
- Danubiana Roman
- Indagrara Arad
- CFR Turda
- CFR Brașov
- Tractorul Brașov
- Locomotiva Reșița
- Explosivii Făgăraș
- CFR Craiova
- Astra Română Poiana
- Metalosport Ferdinand
- Tisa Sighet
- PCA Constanța
- Franco-Româna Brăila
- Lugoj
- CFR Târgu Mureș
- Venus București
- ST București
- Gloria Arad
- Doljul Craiova
- Dinamo Suceava

Promoted to Divizia A

- Metalochimic București
- Politehnica Timișoara

=== Excluded teams ===
Sparta Arad and CS Aninoasa were excluded from Divizia B.

=== Renamed teams ===
Crișana Oradea was renamed as CFR Oradea.

FC Ploiești was renamed as CFR Ploiești.

Gloria CFR Galați was renamed as CFR Galați.

Socec Lafayette București was renamed as Socec București.

Sporting Pitești was renamed as Țesătatoria Română Pitești.

Șoimii CFR Sibiu was renamed as CFR Sibiu.

UD Reșița was renamed as Metalochimic Reșița.

=== Other teams ===
Phoenix Baia Mare and Minaur Baia Mare merged, the new formed team was named as CSM Baia Mare.

Ferar Cluj and CFR Cluj merged, Ferar being absorbed by CFR, also CFR Cluj was promoted to Divizia A in the place of Ferar.

== League tables ==
=== Serie I ===
Pos	Team	Pld	W	D	L	GF	GA	GD	Pts	Promotion or relegation
1	CFR Sibiu (C, P)	26	17	6	3	64	21	+43	40	Promotion to Divizia A
2	ARLUS Bacău	26	13	7	6	42	30	+12	33	
3	Textila Sfântu Gheorghe	26	14	4	8	70	34	+36	32	
4	Astra Română Moreni	26	13	6	7	46	36	+10	32	
5	Concordia Ploiești	26	14	3	9	45	29	+16	31	
6	Politehnica Iași	26	13	4	9	41	35	+6	30	
7	CFR Galați	26	10	8	8	49	44	+5	28	
8	Țesătoria Română Pitești	26	12	3	11	32	39	−7	27	
9	Socec București	26	11	5	10	39	40	−1	27	
10	Arsenal Sibiu (R)	26	10	5	11	49	41	+8	25	Relegation to Divizia C
11	CFR Ploiești (R)	26	7	4	15	26	56	−30	18	Relegation to Divizia C
12	Grivița CFR București (R)	26	6	5	15	25	38	−13	17	Relegation to Divizia C
13	Dezrobirea Constanța (R)	26	4	5	17	27	49	−22	13	Relegation to Divizia C
14	FC Călărași (R)	26	3	5	18	19	82	−63	11	Relegation to Divizia C

Source: romaniansoccer.ro
Rules for classification: 1) Points 2) Head-to-head points; 3) Head-to-head goal difference; 4) Head-to-head goals scored; 5) Head-to-head away goals scored; 6) Goal difference; 7) Goals scored.
(C) Champions; (P) Promoted; (R) Relegated

=== Serie II ===
Pos	Team	Pld	W	D	L	GF	GA	GD	Pts	Promotion or relegation
1	Dinamo B București (C)	26	15	6	5	72	38	+34	36	Ineligible for promotion
2	Metalochimic Reșița (P)	26	15	4	7	66	35	+31	34	Promotion to Divizia A
3	Baia Mare	26	14	6	6	59	38	+21	34	
4	IS Câmpia Turzii	26	11	7	8	55	41	+14	29	
5	Minerul Lupeni	26	12	4	10	49	42	+7	28	
6	Mica Brad	26	9	8	9	27	47	−20	26	
7	CFR Arad	26	10	6	10	43	37	+6	26	
8	CFR Satu Mare	26	9	8	9	41	41	0	26	
9	CFR Oradea	26	10	6	10	51	49	+2	26	
10	Dermata Cluj (R)	26	10	6	10	37	33	+4	26	Relegation to Divizia C
11	CFR Turnu Severin (R)	26	8	5	13	32	49	−17	21	Relegation to Divizia C
12	Solvay Uioara (R)	26	9	1	16	30	69	−39	19	Relegation to Divizia C
13	CAM Timișoara (R)	26	5	7	14	35	56	−21	17	Relegation to Divizia C
14	Șurianul Sebeș (R)	26	7	2	17	24	46	−22	16	Relegation to Divizia C

Source: romaniansoccer.ro
Rules for classification: 1) Points 2) Head-to-head points; 3) Head-to-head goal difference; 4) Head-to-head goals scored; 5) Head-to-head away goals scored; 6) Goal difference; 7) Goals scored.
(C) Champions; (P) Promoted; (R) Relegated

== See also ==
- 1948–49 Divizia A
