= 1937–38 Divizia B =

Divizia B
- Season: 1937–38
- Promoted: Tricolor Ploiești; UD Reșița
- Relegated: None

The 1937–38 Divizia B was the fourth season of the second tier of the Romanian football league system.

The format has been maintained, but this time both series had 12 teams, instead of 13. Also it was decided to reduce Divizia A to a single series of 12 teams, so only the winners of the Divizia B series promoted.

== Team changes ==
=== To Divizia B ===
Promoted from Divizia C

- Tricolor Baia Mare
- Telefon Club București
- UD Reșița
- SG Sibiu
- Hatmanul Luca Arbore Rădăuți
- Gloria CFR Galați
- Prahova Ploiești

Relegated from Divizia A

- —

=== From Divizia B ===
Relegated to Divizia C

- —

Promoted to Divizia A

- Sportul Studențesc
- Phoenix Baia Mare
- CFR Brașov
- Jiul Petroșani
- Dacia Unirea IG Brăila
- Vulturii Textila Lugoj
- Dragoș Vodă Cernăuți
- Olimpia CFR Satu Mare

=== Disqualified teams ===
- IAR Brașov

== League tables ==
=== Serie I ===
Pos	Team	Pld	W	D	L	GF	GA	GD	Pts	Promotion
1	Tricolor Ploiești (C, P)	22	17	2	3	77	12	+65	36	Promotion to Divizia A
2	Victoria Constanța	22	15	4	3	69	20	+49	34	
3	Franco-Româna Brăila	22	14	1	7	64	45	+19	29	
4	Telefon Club București	22	13	3	6	72	34	+38	29	
5	Craiovan Craiova	22	12	4	6	41	31	+10	28	
6	Gloria CFR Galați	22	11	4	7	44	30	+14	26	
7	Dacia VA Galați	22	7	3	12	26	47	−21	17	
8	Textila Moldova Iași	22	6	5	11	29	53	−24	17	
9	Maccabi București	22	6	2	14	33	57	−24	14	
10	Sporting Chișinău	22	4	3	15	28	54	−26	11	
11	Hatmanul Luca Arbore Radăuți	22	5	1	16	27	74	−47	11	
12	Jahn Cernăuți	22	4	2	16	24	77	−53	10	

Source: romaniansoccer.ro
Rules for classification: 1) Points 2) Head-to-head points; 3) Head-to-head goal difference; 4) Head-to-head goals scored; 5) Head-to-head away goals scored; 6) Goal difference; 7) Goals scored.
(C) Champions; (P) Promoted

=== Serie II ===
Pos	Team	Pld	W	D	L	GF	GA	GD	Pts	Promotion
1	UD Reșița (C, P)	22	17	2	3	76	21	+55	36	Promotion to Divizia A
2	CAM Timișoara	22	17	2	3	81	27	+54	36	
3	Mureșul Târgu Mureș	22	14	3	5	62	36	+26	31	
4	Tricolor Baia Mare	22	12	4	6	59	38	+21	28	
5	Stăruința Oradea	22	12	3	7	46	46	0	27	
6	Rovine Grivița Craiova	22	11	1	10	44	47	−3	23	
7	Prahova Ploiești	22	10	1	11	44	39	+5	21	
8	CFR Simeria	22	9	2	11	32	37	−5	20	
9	Victoria Carei	22	7	2	13	23	43	−20	16	
10	Unirea MV Alba Iulia	22	6	0	16	22	74	−52	12	
11	Șoimii Sibiu	22	1	2	19	16	58	−42	4	
12	SG Sibiu	22	0	0	22	7	76	−69	0	

Source: romaniansoccer.ro
Rules for classification: 1) Points 2) Head-to-head points; 3) Head-to-head goal difference; 4) Head-to-head goals scored; 5) Head-to-head away goals scored; 6) Goal difference; 7) Goals scored.
(C) Champions; (P) Promoted

== See also ==
- 1937–38 Divizia A
