= Costică Toma =

Romanian footballer and manager

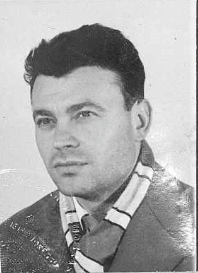
- Toma in 1961

Personal information
- Full name: Constantin Toma
- Date of birth: 1 January 1928
- Place of birth: Brăila, Kingdom of Romania
- Date of death: 13 May 2008 (aged 80)
- Place of death: Bucharest, Romania
- Height: 1.74 m (5 ft 9 in)
- Position: Goalkeeper

Youth career
- 1940–1942: Suter București
- 1942–1948: Capșa București

Senior career*
Years	Team	Apps	(Gls)
1950–1951	CS Armata Iași		
1951	CA Câmpulung Moldovenesc		
1951–1963	Steaua București	108	(0)
Total		108	(0)

International career
1953–1959	Romania	16	(0)

Managerial career
- 1963–1964: TUG București
- 1964–1965: Marina Mangalia
- 1965–1966: Unirea Râmnicu Vâlcea
- 1971–1972: UM Timișoara
- 1972–1976: FC Constanța (youth)
- 1977: FIL Orăștie
- * Club domestic league appearances and goals

Costică Toma (1 January 1928 – 13 May 2008) was a Romanian international football goalkeeper and later manager.

== Playing career ==
He was born in Brăila, into a family coming from Muralto, Switzerland. Toma began his football career in 1940, when he played for FC Suter as a striker. After a period when he played as a youth for Capșa București, he moved to Iași. He played only a season at CS ta, and after two months at Câmpulung Moldovenesc, he moved to Steaua București. He played twelve years for the Army club, and was a part of the Steaua Golden Team. He had at Steaua a famous and a fair-play rivalry with Ion Voinescu. It was said that Toma and Voinescu were the best couple of goalkeepers that a Romanian football club ever had. Toma won also 16 caps for Romania.

Toma retired from professional football in 1961.

== Coaching career ==
Despite being a great goalkeeper, Toma was not a successful manager. He managed only lower league sides and also a large number of youth teams.

== Personal life and death ==
Toma was married and had two children living today in Geneva, Switzerland. He died in Bucharest in 2008, and was buried in the city's Ghencea Military Cemetery.

== Honours ==
Steaua București

- Divizia A: 1952, 1953, 1956, 1959–60, 1960–61
- Cupa României: 1952, 1955

Romania

- World University Games: 1954
