= Șoimii Sibiu =

- Full name: Șoimii Sibiu Fotbal Club
- Nickname: Falcons
- Short name: Șoimii (Falcons)
- Founded: 1913
- Dissolved: 2001
- Ground: Stadionul IPA Sibiu, Sibiu
- Capacity: 4,000
- League: Liga III (last time)

Șoimii Sibiu (Falcons Sibiu) was a Romanian football team from Sibiu. They were founded in 1913 and disappeared in 2001.

They were a main team in Sibiu, being four times regional champions of Sibiu. Their best pre-war performance was defeating the 6-time-in-a-row champion Chinezul Timişoara in 1927–28 quarter-finals. But after that they forfeited their semi-final tie against Jiul Lupeni.

They also played three seasons in the Divizia A : 1932–33, 1933–34, 1950, but without notable performances.

== Chronology of names ==
Name	Period
Șoimii Sibiu	1913–1947
Șoimii CFR Sibiu	1947–1948
CFR Sibiu	1948–1950
Locomotiva Sibiu	1950–1973
Șoimii Sibiu	1973–1981
Șoimii IPA Sibiu	1981–2001

== Honours ==
Liga II:

- Winners (1): 1948–49
- Runners-up (7): 1935–36, 1947–48, 1973–74, 1974–75, 1975–76, 1983–84, 1984–85

Liga III:

- Winners (2): 1946–47, 1989–90

Liga IV – Sibiu County:

- Winners (2): 1993–94, 1994–95

== Former managers ==
- (Romania) Ion Ionescu (1973–1974)
- (Romania) Gheorghe Ola (1974–1975)
- (Romania) Constantin Teașcă (1975–1976)
- (Romania) Ștefan Coidum (1978–1979)
- (Romania) Nicolae Lupescu (1981–1982)

== League history ==
Season	Tier	Division	Place	Notes	Cupa României
2000–01	3	Divizia C (Seria VII)	14th	Withdrew; dissolved	
1999–00	3	Divizia C (Seria V)	2nd		
1998–99	3	Divizia C (Seria III)	3rd		
1997–98	3	Divizia C (Seria III)	11th		
1996–97	3	Divizia C (Seria IV)	6th		
1995–96	3	Divizia C (Seria III)	3rd		
1994–95	4	Divizia D (SB)	1st (C, P)	Promoted	
1993–94	4	Divizia D (SB)	1st (C)		
1992–93	3	Divizia C (Seria III)	18th	Relegated	
1991–92	2	Divizia B (Seria II)	16th	Relegated	
1990–91	2	Divizia B (Seria II)	5th		
1989–90	3	Divizia C (Seria VII)	1st (C)	Promoted	
1988–89	3	Divizia C (Seria IX)	9th		
1987–88	3	Divizia C (Seria X)	9th		
1986–87	3	Divizia C (Seria XI)	4th		
1985–86	2	Divizia B (Seria II)	17th	Relegated	
1984–85	2	Divizia B (Seria II)	2nd		
1983–84	2	Divizia B (Seria II)	2nd		
1982–83	2	Divizia B (Seria II)	13th		
1981–82	2	Divizia B (Seria II)	4th	Renamed Șoimii IPA Sibiu	
1980–81	2	Divizia B (Seria II)	14th		
1979–80	2	Divizia B (Seria II)	8th		
1978–79	2	Divizia B (Seria II)	13th		
1977–78	2	Divizia B (Seria II)	12th		
1976–77	2	Divizia B (Seria II)	11th		
1975–76	2	Divizia B (Seria III)	2nd		
1974–75	2	Divizia B (Seria III)	2nd		
1973–74	2	Divizia B (Seria II)	2nd	Renamed Șoimii Sibiu	
1972–73	2	Divizia B (Seria II)	5th		
1971–72	2	Divizia B (Seria II)	6th		
1970–71	2	Divizia B (Seria II)	3rd		
1969–70	2	Divizia B (Seria II)	2nd		
1968–69	2	Divizia B (Seria II)	8th		
1967–68	2	Divizia B (Seria II)	9th		
1966–67	2	Divizia B (Seria II)	10th		
1965–66	2	Divizia B (Seria II)	12th		
1964–65	2	Divizia B (Seria II)	5th		
1963–64	2	Divizia B (Seria II)	12th		
1962–63	2	Divizia B (Seria II)	3rd		
1961–62	2	Divizia B (Seria II)	7th		
1960–61	2	Divizia B (Seria II)	4th		
1959–60	2	Divizia B (Seria III)	6th		
1958–59	2	Divizia B (Seria I)	3rd		
1957–58	2	Divizia B (Seria I)	5th		Round of 16
1957	2	Divizia B (Cupa Primăverii, Seria I)	1st (C)		
1956	2	Divizia B (Seria I)	6th		Round of 16
1955	2	Divizia B (Seria I)	2nd		
1954	2	Divizia B (Seria I)	2nd		
1953	2	Divizia B (Seria I)	10th		Round of 16
1952	2	Divizia B (Seria I)	4th		Round of 32
1951	2	Divizia B (Seria I)	12th		
1950	1	Divizia A	12th	Renamed Locomotiva Sibiu; Relegated	Semi-finals
1948–49	2	Divizia B (Seria I)	1st (C)	Renamed CFR Sibiu; Promoted	Semi-finals
1947–48	2	Divizia B (Seria I)	2nd	Renamed Șoimii CFR Sibiu	
1946–47	3	Divizia C (Seria VIII)	1st (C)	Promoted	
1945–46	–	Regional Championship (Sibiu)	–		
1944–45	–	Regional Championship (Sibiu)	–		
1943–44	–	Regional Championship (Sibiu)	–		
1942–43	–	Wartime competitions	–		
1941–42	–	Wartime competitions	–		
1940–41	–	Regional Championship (Sibiu)	–		
1939–40	–	Regional Championship (Sibiu)	–		
1938–39	2	Divizia B (West Series, South Group)	10th		
1937–38	2	Divizia B (Seria II)	11th		
1936–37	2	Divizia B (West Series)	9th		
1935–36	2	Divizia B (Seria IV – Centre)	2nd		Round of 32
1934–35	2	Divizia B (Seria IV – Centre)	7th		
1933–34	1	Divizia A (Seria II)	8th	Relegated	Round of 32
1932–33	1	Divizia A (Seria I)	7th		
1931–32	2	Regional Championship (Sibiu)	1st (C)	Promoted	
1930–31	2	Regional Championship (Sibiu)	3rd		
1929–30	2	Regional Championship (Sibiu)	2nd		
1928–29	2	Regional Championship (Sibiu)	1st (C)	Regional champions	
1927–28	2	Regional Championship (Sibiu)	1st (C)	Regional champions	
1926–27	2	Regional Championship (Sibiu)	5th		
1925–26	2	Regional Championship (Sibiu)	4th		
1924–25	2	Regional Championship (Sibiu)	1st (C)	Regional champions	
1923–24	2	Regional Championship (Sibiu)	1st (C)	Regional champions	
1922–23	2	Regional Championship (Brașov–Sibiu)	–		
1921–22	2	Regional Championship (Sibiu)	4th		
1913–21	2	Regional competitions (Sibiu)	–		
