= Stere Zeană =

Romanian footballer

Personal information
- Date of birth: 26 March 1926
- Position: Striker

Senior career*
Years	Team	Apps	(Gls)
1941–1943	FC Călărași		
1943–1946	Venus București		
1946–1948	ITA Arad		
1948–1951	CCA București	38	(2)
1951–1953	CA Câmpulung Moldovenesc		
1953–1954	Universitatea Cluj	29	(7)
1955–1956	Locomotiva București		

International career
1954	Romania	1	(0)

Managerial career
- 1957–1962: Minerul Vatra Dornei
- 1962–1964: Minerul Deva
- 1968: Politehnica Timișoara
- 1969–1971: CFR Timișoara
- 1971–1976: Electromotor Timișoara
- 1977–1981: Dorna Vatra Dornei
- 1981–1984: Minerul Vatra Dornei
- * Club domestic league appearances and goals

Stere Zeană (born 26 March 1926, date of death unknown) was a Romanian footballer who played as a striker. He was also a manager. Zeană was an ethnic Aromanian, having been born in an Aromanian family. He had a son, Cornel Zeană, who became a physician.

== International career ==
Stere Zeană played one friendly match for Romania, on 19 September 1954 under coach Ștefan Dobay in a 5–1 loss against Hungary.

== Honours ==
Steaua București

- Cupa României: 1948–49

Locomotiva București

- Divizia B: 1955
