= 1957–58 Cupa României =

Tournament details
- Country: Romania

Final positions
- Champions: Ştiinţa Timişoara
- Runners-up: Progresul București

The 1957–58 Cupa României was the 20th edition of Romania's most prestigious football cup competition.

The title was won by Ştiinţa Timişoara against Progresul București.

== Format ==
The competition is an annual knockout tournament.

In the first round proper, two pots were made, first pot with Divizia A teams and other teams till 16 and the second pot with the rest of teams qualified in this phase. Each tie is played as a single leg.

It is the first season in the history of Cupa României when all the games are played on a neutral location.

If a match is drawn after 90 minutes, the game goes in extra time, and if the scored is still tight after 120 minutes, then a replay will be played.

From the first edition, the teams from Divizia A entered in competition in sixteen finals, rule which remained till today.

== First round proper ==
Team 1	Score	Team 2
6 April 1958
Metalul Reșița (Div. B)	0–1	(Div. A) Ştiinţa Timişoara
Dinamo Bârlad (Div. B)	2–2 (a.e.t.)	(Div. C) CFR Iaşi
Farul Constanța (Div. B)	1–0 (a.e.t.)	(Div. A) Dinamo București
Dinamo Obor București (Div. B)	2–0 (a.e.t.)	(Div. B) Ştiinţa București
Progresul București (Div. A)	5–4	(Div. C) Titanii București
Gloria Bistriţa (Div. C)	5–2	(Div. A) CS Târgu Mureș
CFR Turnu Severin (Div. C)	1–1 (a.e.t.)	(Div. A) Jiul Petroșani
Dinamo Bacău (Div. B)	0–1	(Div. A) Rapid București
Petrolul Ploiești (Div. A)	11–0	(Div. C) Dinamo Brăila
Tractorul Brașov (Div. B)	2–1	(Div. B) IS Câmpia Turzii
Dinamo Cluj (Div. A)	3–1	(Div. D) Stăruinţa Satu Mare
CCA București (Div. A)	7–1	(Div. B) Flacăra Moreni
CS Oradea (Div. A)	2–1	(Div. C) Stăruinţa Salonta
Steagul Roşu Oraşul Stalin (Div. A)	3–2	(Div. B) Corvinul Hunedoara
Progresul Sibiu (Div. B)	4–2	(Div. D) UV Arad
15 April 1958
Minerul Lupeni (Div. B)	3–2	(Div. A) UTA Arad
16 April 1958 — Replays
CFR Iaşi (Div. C)	4–0 (R)	(Div. B) Dinamo Bârlad
Jiul Petroșani (Div. A)	4–1 (R)	(Div. C) CFR Turnu Severin

== Second round proper ==
Team 1	Score	Team 2
27 April 1958
Ştiinţa Timişoara	3–0	Minerul Lupeni
Progresul București	5–1	Farul Constanța
Rapid București	2–1	Dinamo Obor București
CCA București	8–0	Tractorul Brașov
CS Oradea	3–2	Gloria Bistriţa
Petrolul Ploiești	3–2	CFR Iaşi
Dinamo Cluj	2–1	Progresul Sibiu
Steagul Roşu Oraşul Stalin	2–0	Jiul Petroșani

== Quarter-finals ==
Team 1	Score	Team 2
24 May 1958
Steagul Roşu Oraşul Stalin	2–1	Petrolul Ploiești
25 May 1958
Progresul București	2–0	Rapid București
12 June 1958
CS Oradea	3–1	CCA București
Ştiinţa Timişoara	2–1	Dinamo Cluj

== Semi-finals ==
Team 1	Score	Team 2
29 June 1958
Ştiinţa Timişoara	3–2	Steagul Roşu Oraşul Stalin
Progresul București	4–0	CS Oradea

== Final ==
6 July 1958
17:30 EET

Știința Timișoara	1–0	Progresul București
Cădariu 37'	Report

23 August, Bucharest
Attendance: 40,000
Referee: Solomon Segal (Bucharest)

Cupa României 1957–58 winners

1st title
