= 1952 Divizia A =

35th season of top-tier football league in Romania

Divizia A
- Season: 1952
- Champions: CCA București
- Top goalscorer: Titus Ozon (17)

The 1952 Divizia A was the thirty-fifth season of Divizia A, the top-level football league of Romania.

== Teams ==
Location of teams in 1952 Divizia A

== League table ==
Pos	Team	Pld	W	D	L	GF	GA	GD	Pts	Qualification or relegation
1	CCA București (C)	22	15	6	1	46	16	+30	36	Champions of Romania
2	Dinamo București	22	14	6	2	51	23	+28	34	
3	CA Câmpulung Moldovenesc	22	10	5	7	36	25	+11	25	
4	Locomotiva Târgu Mureş	22	9	5	8	37	35	+2	23	
5	Știința Cluj	22	7	7	8	24	23	+1	21	
6	Progresul Oradea	22	7	7	8	35	36	−1	21	
7	Locomotiva Timișoara	22	7	7	8	20	31	−11	21	
8	Flamura Roșie Arad	22	7	6	9	32	34	−2	20	
9	Flacăra Petroșani	22	5	8	9	24	38	−14	18	
10	Dinamo Orașul Stalin	22	4	9	9	31	39	−8	17	
11	Flacăra Ploiești (R)	22	6	3	13	35	44	−9	15	Relegation to Divizia B
12	Metalul Câmpia Turzii (R)	22	3	7	12	23	50	−27	13	Relegation to Divizia B

Source: LT
Rules for classification: 1) points; 2) goal average; 3) number of goals scored
(C) Champions; (R) Relegated

=== Results ===
Home \ Away	CAM	CCA	DIN	DOS	FPT	FLA	FRA	LTI	TÂR	TUR	ORA	ȘCJ
CA Câmpulung	—	1–3	0–0	2–3	3–0	4–1	3–1	0–0	1–2	1–1	2–1	0–1
CCA București	3–1	—	1–1	1–0	4–0	3–0	2–1	4–1	3–0	3–0	2–2	1–1
Dinamo București	1–1	1–0	—	3–0	7–3	4–1	2–2	3–2	1–0	5–1	3–1	2–0
Dinamo Orașul Stalin	0–0	2–2	2–4	—	1–1	2–3	1–1	2–0	8–1	1–1	1–1	0–0
Flacăra Petroșani	2–1	1–3	0–2	2–0	—	1–1	0–2	2–0	3–0	1–1	1–1	1–0
Flacăra Ploiești	1–2	1–2	0–2	4–1	4–2	—	2–4	0–1	4–0	4–0	2–3	2–2
Flamura Roșie Arad	1–2	1–3	1–1	0–3	0–0	1–0	—	0–0	3–1	3–1	3–0	0–0
Locomotiva Timișoara	0–5	1–1	2–1	2–1	1–1	1–0	2–1	—	1–1	1–0	2–0	0–0
Locomotiva Târgu Mureş	3–1	0–1	5–1	4–0	0–0	5–1	4–3	1–0	—	5–0	2–2	0–0
Metalul Câmpia Turzii	0–3	1–2	0–5	2–2	1–1	0–1	3–1	1–1	1–1	—	2–3	2–0
Progresul Oradea	1–2	0–0	0–0	4–0	2–1	1–1	1–3	4–1	1–0	4–5	—	1–2
Știința Cluj	0–1	0–2	1–2	1–1	4–1	3–2	3–0	3–1	0–2	2–0	1–2	—

Source: LT (in Romanian)
Legend: Blue = home team win; Yellow = draw; Red = away team win.

== Top goalscorers ==
Rank	Player	Club	Goals
1	Titus Ozon	Dinamo București	17
2	Dumitru Călin	CA Câmpulung Moldovenesc	12
2	Gheorghe Váczi	Progresul Oradea	12
2	Stere Zeană	CA Câmpulung Moldovenesc	12
5	Alexandru Ene	Dinamo București	11
5	Constantin Titi Popescu	Flacăra Ploiești	11

== Champion squad ==
CCA București

Goalkeepers: Ion Voinescu (10 / 0); Costică Toma (16 / 0).
Defenders: Vasile Zavoda (21 / 0); Alexandru Apolzan (22 / 0); Ștefan Rodeanu (10 / 0); Traian Ivănescu (11 / 0); Victor Dumitrescu (11 / 0).
Midfielders: Ștefan Balint (20 / 0); Tiberiu Bone (22 / 0).
Forwards: Victor Moldovan (21 / 10); Francisc Zavoda (19 / 5); Nicolae Drăgan (17 / 9); Abagiu Pârvu (9 / 2); József Pecsovszky (21 / 9); Petre Moldoveanu (20 / 7); Mihai Flamaropol (7 / 3); Ilie Gârleanu (2 / 0).
(league appearances and goals listed in brackets)

Manager: Gheorghe Popescu I.

== See also ==
- 1952 Divizia B
