= CSM Avântul Reghin =

Romanian football club

Avântul Reghin
- Full name: Club Sportiv Municipal; Avântul Reghin
- Nicknames: Alb-albaștrii (The White and Blues)
- Short name: Avântul
- Founded: 1949; 77 years ago
- Ground: Municipal
- Capacity: 5,000
- Owner: Reghin Municipality
- Chairman: Răzvan Dan
- Manager: Andrei Enyedi
- League: Liga IV
- 2025–26: Liga IV Mureș, 2nd of 14
Home colours	Away colours

Club Sportiv Municipal Avântul Reghin, commonly known as Avântul Reghin, is a Romanian football club based in Reghin, Mureș County, which currently competes in Liga IV Mureș County, one of the regional divisions of the fourth tier of Romanian football league system.

The club was founded in the summer of 1949 and, over time, has been known under several names, including IPEIL Reghin, Avântul Reghin and Avântul-Recolta Reghin, before reverting to the name Avântul Reghin in 1958. Avântul played in the Romanian first league during the 1955 season and, throughout its history, competed in the lower leagues of Romanian football. Following their withdrawal in the 1999–2000 season, Avântul returned to the national leagues in the 2002–03 season and, after twenty-three consecutive seasons in the third tier, was relegated to Liga IV in 2025.

== History ==
Football was played in Reghin in an organized manner even before the First World War, as noted by Professor Ioan Costea in the book Avântul Reghin – Football and Honor. In the interwar period, the strongest local team was Victoria, but with the development of the main factories in the city, several teams were established to motivate their workers. Thus, there appeared formations such as Foresta Română, Partizanul, Nautica, Producția, Recolta, Progresul and Rapid, which later formed the core and foundation of Avântul Reghin.

In 1946, three of the strongest teams in Reghin – Foresta Română, Nautica and Cărămida – merged to form Foresta Reghin, driven by the desire for higher performance. The team quickly achieved notable results, reaching the quarter-finals of the 1947–48 Cupa României. In 1949, following the nationalization process in Romania and the reorganization of IPEIL, the factory that supported the club, Foresta was restructured under Wajda János. Established on 16 June 1949 as IPEIL Reghin, the club was renamed Avântul Reghin a few months later.

In 1952, Avântul earned promotion to Divizia B after winning the Mureș Regional Championship and the promotion play-offs against Progresul Orașul Stalin, Avântul Sighetu Marmației and Metalul Hunedoara. In Divizia B, the White and Blues competed in Series II, finishing 11th in 1953 and winning the series in 1954 under coach Alexandru Schwartz, thereby earning promotion to Divizia A. The squad included Cojocaru, Szekes, Katona II, Bartha, Tonița, Veszi, Fehér, Lukacs, Katona I, Constantinescu, Balint, Nistor, Eles, Mateon, Farago, Munteanu and Asztalos I.

The 1955 Divizia A season was a dismal one, as the team coached by Elemer Kocsis in the first half and by Stelian Lupu in the second recorded only three wins and finished last in the table, resulting in relegation. Nevertheless, Avântul reached the Round of 32 of the Cupa României, where it was eliminated 0–1 by Flacăra Mediaș.

Back in Divizia B, Avântul competed in Series I in the 1956 season, during which it was renamed Avântul-Recolta in June and, under coach Vasile Gain, finished 11th, narrowly avoiding relegation. The following season began in the summer of 1957, as Romanian football transitioned to an autumn–spring system, during which the club was renamed Partizanul Reghin, finished 13th and was relegated to Divizia C. In the third tier, the club reverted to its traditional name, Avântul Reghin, competed in Series IV and finished 8th in the 1958–59 season. In 1959, after the dissolution of Divizia C, Avântul was placed in the regional championship.

Avântul competed in Series I of the Mureș Regional Championship, finishing 2nd in the 1960–61 season and winning the series in 1961–62, qualified for the championship final, where it defeated Voința Târgu Mureș (1–0 away and 4–1 at home), winning the regional title and qualifying for the promotion play-off, where it finished 4th in Group III held in Mediaș. In 1962–63, when the regional championship was played in a single-series format, the club finished 6th.

In 1963, Avântul ceded its place to Progresul Reghin and continued to compete in the raion championship, the second tier of the regional system and the fifth tier of Romanian football. The club returned to the Mureș Regional Championship in the 1965–66 season, competing in Series II and finishing 8th, before moving to Series I, where it finished 7th in 1966–67 and 3rd in 1967–68, with Ludovic Serfőző scoring 15 goals, earning promotion to Divizia C following the expansion of the third tier and returning to the national competitions after nine years of absence.

After relegation from Divizia C in 1995, Avântul returned by winning the Mureș County Championship in 1998–99. The club dropped out of the national leagues again after the 1999–2000 season but returned to Divizia C in 2002–03.

In 2008, the team finished second in the third league and participated at the play-offs for the promotion to Liga II. It made a good impression but failed to qualify. Same in 2016.

Avântul then remained continuously in the third tier until 2024–25, when it finished 9th in Series VII and was relegated to Liga IV. In 2025–26, Avântul competed in the Liga 4 Elite organised by AJF Mureș and finished second with 61 points from 26 matches, two points behind champions Academica Transilvania Târgu Mureș.

== Ground ==
Avântul currently plays its home matches at Baza Sportivă Metalul in Reghin, which is also listed as the club's home ground by AJF Mureș.

The Municipal Stadium is administered by the Municipality of Reghin and is used by CSM Avântul Reghin for training and official competitions.

== Honours ==
Liga II

- Winners (1): 1954

Liga III

- Winners (3): 1976–77, 1982–83, 1987–88
- Runners-up (6): 1986–87, 1989–90, 1990–91, 1991–92, 2007–08, 2015–16

Liga IV – Mureș County

- Winners (2): 1972–73, 1998–99

Mureș Regional Championship

- Winners (3): 1951, 1952, 1961–62

== Former managers ==
- (Romania) Elemér Kocsis (1955)
- (Romania) Stelian Lupu (1955)
- (Romania) Vasile Gain (1956)
- (Romania) Petre Grosu (1989–1990)
- (Romania) Cristian Dulca (2004)
- (Romania) Sorin Cigan (2008)
- (Romania) Alexandru Schwartz

== League and cup history ==
Season	Tier	Division	Place	Notes	Cupa României
2025–26	4	Liga IV (MS)	2nd		
2024–25	3	Liga III (Series VII)	9th	Relegated	Second round
2023–24	3	Liga III (Series IX)	8th		First round
2022–23	3	Liga III (Series IX)	7th		First round
2021–22	3	Liga III (Series IX)	8th		Second round
2020–21	3	Liga III (Series IX)	3rd		First round
2019–20	3	Liga III (Series V)	8th		Fourth round
2018–19	3	Liga III (Series V)	6th		Second Round
2017–18	3	Liga III (Series V)	10th		Second Round
2016–17	3	Liga III (Series V)	7th		Fourth round
2015–16	3	Liga III (Series V)	2nd		First round
2014–15	3	Liga III (Series V)	9th		Third round
2013–14	3	Liga III (Series VI)	11th		First round
2012–13	3	Liga III (Series VI)	7th		Third round
2011–12	3	Liga III (Series VI)	5th		Second Round
2010–11	3	Liga III (Series VI)	9th		Fourth round
2009–10	3	Liga III (Series VI)	15th	Spared from (R)	First round
2008–09	3	Liga III (Series VI)	8th		
2007–08	3	Liga III (Series VI)	2nd		
2006–07	3	Liga III (Series V)	13th		
2005–06	3	Divizia C (Series VIII)	5th		
2004–05	3	Divizia C (Series VIII)	6th		
2003–04	3	Divizia C (Series IX)	4th		
2002–03	3	Divizia C (Serie VI)	11th		
1999–00	3	Divizia C (Series VI)	17th	Relegated	
1998–99	4	Divizia D (MS)	1st (C)	Promoted	
1994–95	3	Divizia C (Series IV)	20th	Relegated	
1993–94	3	Divizia C (Series IV)	3rd		
1992–93	3	Divizia C (Series IV)	6th		
1991–92	3	Divizia C (Series VIII)	2nd		
1990–91	3	Divizia C (Series IX)	2nd		
1989–90	3	Divizia C (Series II)	2nd		
1988–89	2	Divizia B (Series III)	18th	Relegated	
1987–88	3	Divizia C (Series XI)	1st (C)	Promoted	
