= 1953 Divizia B =

14th season of the Divizia B, the second tier of the Romanian football league

Divizia B
- Season: 1953
- Promoted: Flacăra Ploiești; Metalul Hunedoara; Metalul Câmpia Turzii
- Relegated: Șantierul Constanța; CA Cluj; CA Craiova

The 1953 Divizia B was the 14th season of the second tier of the Romanian football league system.

The format with two series has been maintained, but each of them being expanded from 12 to 16. At the end of the season the winners of the series and one second place promoted to Divizia A and only the teams which had organizational problems relegated to District Championship, because the series would be expanded from the next season. This was the fourth season played in the spring-autumn system, a system imposed by the new leadership of the country which were in close ties with the Soviet Union.

== Team changes ==
=== To Divizia B ===
Promoted from Regional Championship

- Avântul Reghin
- Dinamo Bacău
- Dinamo Turnu Măgurele
- Locomotiva Craiova
- Metalul Brăila
- Metalul Hunedoara
- Metalul Reșița
- Șantierul Constanța

Relegated from Divizia A

- Flacăra Ploiești
- Metalul Câmpia Turzii

=== From Divizia B ===
Relegated to Regional Championship

- —

Promoted to Divizia A

- Locomotiva GR București
- Știința Timișoara

=== Renamed teams ===
Flacăra Lupeni was renamed as Minerul Lupeni.

Flacăra Poiana Câmpina was renamed as Metalul Câmpina.

Înainte Sibiu was renamed as Libertatea Sibiu.

== League tables ==
=== Serie I ===
Pos	Team	Pld	W	D	L	GF	GA	GD	Pts	Promotion or relegation
1	Flacăra Ploiești (C, P)	30	22	4	4	76	23	+53	48	Promotion to Divizia A
2	Spartac București	30	19	6	5	50	23	+27	44	
3	Metalul Câmpina	30	17	5	8	53	32	+21	39	
4	Dinamo Bacău	30	15	5	10	54	41	+13	35	
5	Șantierul Constanța (R)	30	13	5	12	49	42	+7	31	Relegation to Regional Championship
6	Metalul Steagul Roșu	30	9	13	8	33	34	−1	31	
7	Metalul București	30	10	10	10	34	36	−2	30	
8	Locomotiva Iași	30	11	7	12	40	40	0	29	
9	Știința Iași	30	10	9	11	45	48	−3	29	
10	Libertatea Sibiu	30	9	10	11	33	35	−2	28	
11	Dinamo Turnu Măgurele	30	7	14	9	30	36	−6	28	
12	Flamura Roșie Sfântu Gheorghe	30	8	9	13	26	44	−18	25	
13	Flacăra Moreni	30	9	6	15	43	51	−8	24	
14	Flamura Roșie Pitești	30	8	8	14	26	40	−14	24	
15	Flamura Roșie Bacău	30	5	9	16	32	59	−27	19	
16	Metalul Brăila	30	4	8	18	28	68	−40	16	

Source: romaniansoccer.ro
Rules for classification: 1) Points 2) Head-to-head points; 3) Head-to-head goal difference; 4) Head-to-head goals scored; 5) Head-to-head away goals scored; 6) Goal difference; 7) Goals scored.
(C) Champions; (P) Promoted; (R) Relegated

=== Serie II ===
Pos	Team	Pld	W	D	L	GF	GA	GD	Pts	Promotion or relegation
1	Metalul Hunedoara (C, P)	28	15	10	3	51	25	+26	40	Promotion to Divizia A
2	Metalul Câmpia Turzii (P)	28	16	4	8	48	35	+13	36	Promotion to Divizia A
3	Locomotiva Cluj	28	14	7	7	48	32	+16	35	
4	Progresul Satu Mare	28	13	4	11	47	46	+1	30	
5	Locomotiva Turnu Severin	28	12	5	11	42	39	+3	29	
6	Locomotiva Arad	28	13	2	13	38	37	+1	28	
7	Flacăra Mediaș	28	12	2	14	47	42	+5	26	
8	Locomotiva Craiova	28	9	7	12	31	36	−5	25	
9	Metalul Oradea	28	10	4	14	40	49	−9	24	
10	Metalul Reșița	28	10	4	14	36	45	−9	24	
11	Avântul Reghin	28	8	8	12	34	43	−9	24	
12	Locomotiva Oradea	28	7	9	12	26	50	−24	23	
13	Metalul Baia Mare	28	8	6	14	23	37	−14	22	
14	Minerul Lupeni	28	4	8	16	28	56	−28	16	
15	CA Cluj (E)	15	10	4	1	28	6	+22	24	Clubs dissolved
16	CA Craiova (E)	15	6	4	5	27	16	+11	16	Clubs dissolved

Source: romaniansoccer.ro
Rules for classification: 1) Points 2) Head-to-head points; 3) Head-to-head goal difference; 4) Head-to-head goals scored; 5) Head-to-head away goals scored; 6) Goal difference; 7) Goals scored.
(C) Champions; (E) Eliminated; (P) Promoted

== See also ==
- 1953 Divizia A
- 1953 Regional Championship
- 1953 Cupa României
