= CA Câmpulung Moldovenesc =

- Full name: Casa Armatei Câmpulung Moldovenesc
- Short name: Armata
- Founded: 1948 as CS Armata Iaşi
- Dissolved: 1953
Home colours	Away colours

CA Câmpulung Moldovenesc was a football club based in Câmpulung Moldovenesc, Suceava County, Romania. It was founded in 1948 and dissolved in 1953.

== History ==
The club was founded in the summer of 1948 with initial headquarters at Iaşi under the name of CS Armata (Army Sports Club). It began playing in the Third League, finishing tenth at the end of the 1948–49 season. In the summer of 1949 the club played a play-off for promotion to the Second League against CFR Iaşi, but lost 1–1, 2–3 (3–4) on aggregate. The team used in the first year of existence: Szoboszlay (Streaşină) – Luca, Găvan, Iordan – C. Mihai (W. Uglar), Buimistruc – Mureşan, Bandu, Popay, M. Ionescu, Rubiş (Băieşu).

The following season, 1950, CSA was promoted to the Second League, (coach Gheorghe Gheorghian), using the following 11 players in the play-off: C. Toma – Dan, Orban, Plujar, Töröcsik, Buimistruc, Costea, Faur, Butnaru, Săvuţ, Rubiş.

In 1951 the club moved to Câmpulung Moldovenesc and were promoted to the First League. Coach Eugen Mladin used the following players: Tr. Popa, Zarici, C. Toma – Maiogan, Kapas, Dobrescu, Dobay, Duşan – Onisie, Zeană, Grozea, Sterescu – Geamănu, Gârleanu I, Gârleanu II, Dragoman, Morar, Pálfi, Ursu.

In the First League, now coached by Francisc Rónnay, the club finished third in 1952 and finished the 1953 season (at half season) 1st. In the second part of the 1953 season, the team was disbanded. Some of the players were moved to CCA București and the rest to the other Divizia A teams. In its short First League experience, the club had a number of players: C. Toma, Birtaşu, Cernea, Rodeanu, Topşa, Duşan, Dodeanu, Onisie, Zeană, Cojereanu, Gârleanu I, A. Pârvu, Fusulan, I. Alecsandrescu, Bădeanţu, L. Vlad, Motronea.

== Honours ==
Liga I:

- Winners (0):, Best finish: 3rd 1952

Liga II:

- Winners (1): 1951
