= CFR Turnu Severin =

Romanian football club from Drobeta-Turnu Severin

- Full name: Club Sportiv CFR Turnu Severin 1943
- Nicknames: Ceferiștii (The CFR People); Severinenii (The Severin People); Feroviarii (The Railwaymen); Alb-vișiniii (The White and Burgundies)
- Short name: CFR
- Founded: 1928 (original club); 2018 (revived club)
- Dissolved: 1958 (original club)
- Ground: Schela-Ștrand
- League: Inactive
- 2025–26: Liga IV Mehedinți, withdrew
Home colours	Away colours

Club Sportiv CFR Turnu Severin 1943, commonly known as CFR Turnu Severin, is a Romanian sports club based in Drobeta-Turnu Severin, Mehedinți County, whose senior football team is currently inactive. The organisation established in 2018 revived the name and identity of the historic CFR Turnu Severin, a railway workers' football club founded in 1928 and dissolved in 1958.

The historic club won its 1940–41 Divizia B series and earned promotion to Divizia A, although the normal championship was suspended before it could make its top-flight debut. Its main achievement was winning the 1942–43 Cupa României, defeating Sportul Studențesc 4–0 in the final.

The revived club initially competed in futsal and youth competitions before returning to eleven-a-side senior football in 2023. It won the Mehedinți County stage of the Cupa României in 2024–25. The senior team withdrew during the winter break of the following Liga IV season, although the association remained listed among the affiliated members of AJF Mehedinți in 2026.

== History ==
=== Original club (1928–1958) ===
==== Foundation and rise to Divizia B ====
The club was founded in 1928 as Sborul Turnu Severin and initially played in the regional championship. It later adopted the CFR name, representing the railway workers of Turnu Severin.

CFR appeared in the national Divizia C in 1936–37, but withdrew in April 1937 and its results were annulled.

The club reached the national stage of the 1938–39 Cupa României, losing 0–1 to Prahova Ploiești in the Round of 32.

CFR returned to national league football in 1939–40. It finished eighth in Series II with 15 points from eighteen matches.

The following season was the club's best league campaign. CFR won Series I of 1940–41, with twelve wins, three draws and three defeats, and earned promotion to Divizia A. The outbreak and expansion of the Second World War halted the regular national championship after 1940–41, so CFR never made an official Divizia A appearance.

In the 1940–41 Cupa României, CFR defeated FC Craiova 3–1 before losing 1–2 to Rapid Timișoara in the Round of 16.

==== War years and the 1943 Romanian Cup ====
No official Romanian league championship was held in 1941–42. CFR nevertheless took part in the wartime competitions and reached the final of the unofficial Cupa Basarabiei, losing 1–2 to Rapid București.

In 1942–43, CFR competed in the unofficial Campionatul de Război, finishing fifth with 23 points from 22 matches. The 1942–43 Cupa României, however, retained official status.

CFR defeated SSM Reșița 2–1 after extra time in the Round of 32, advanced past FC Craiova after a 1–1 draw, defeated Universitatea Sibiu 3–0 in the quarter-finals and Jiul Petroșani 2–1 in the semi-finals.

The final was played on 15 August 1943 against Sportul Studențesc at the ANEF Stadium in Bucharest. CFR won 4–0, with Richard Ludwig and Nicolae Reuter scoring twice each.

The winning team was: Dumitru Pavlovici – Ioan Oprean, Vasile Felecan III – Mureșan, Pârjol, Rusalin Marcu – Vidan, Iosif Cozma, Richard Ludwig, Teodor Felecan II and Nicolae Reuter.

In 1943–44, the wartime championship was abandoned before completion. CFR was seventh when play stopped. The club also defeated Progresul Timișoara 4–0 in the Cupa României, but that competition was likewise abandoned.

==== Post-war period and dissolution ====
National league football resumed in 1946. CFR was not placed directly in Divizia A and lost a play-off against FC Craiova, after which it entered Divizia B.

The club finished tenth in Series I in 1946–47 and fourth in Series III in 1947–48. In the 1947–48 Cupa României, CFR reached the quarter-finals, where it lost 0–2 to CFR Timișoara.

An eleventh-place finish in 1948–49 resulted in relegation from Divizia B. The club then spent three seasons in regional football, during which it adopted the name Locomotiva Turnu Severin.

Locomotiva returned to Divizia B in 1952 and finished eighth. It placed fifth in 1953, eleventh in 1954 and fourth in 1955.

The club was relegated after finishing thirteenth in Series I in 1956. In the 1955–56 Cupa României, Locomotiva defeated Știința Timișoara 3–1 before losing 1–3 to Progresul Oradea in the Round of 16.

For 1957–58, the club returned to the CFR Turnu Severin name. It finished fifth in Series III, with ten wins, five draws and nine defeats. CFR also reached the national Round of 32 of the 1957–58 Cupa României, drawing 1–1 with Jiul Petroșani before losing the replay 1–4.

Despite avoiding relegation, CFR was dissolved after the season, ending the original club's thirty-year history.

=== Revival (2018–2026) ===
A new organisation using the historic CFR identity was established in 2018 as CS CFR Turnu Severin 1943. Its first section was futsal, with teams taking part in youth competitions.

The club competed in national youth futsal competitions and reached the Final Four of the Liga Elitelor Futsal U19.

The senior eleven-a-side football section was introduced in 2023. CFR entered Liga IV Mehedinți for 2023–24, the first senior outdoor season under the name since 1958.

CFR finished tenth of eleven teams in Series I, with four wins, one draw and fifteen defeats.

The club had a much stronger 2024–25 season, finishing third in Liga IV Mehedinți with 67 points from 28 matches, behind Viitorul Severin and CS Drobeta 2024.

CFR also won the Mehedinți County stage of the Cupa României. It defeated Viitorul Cujmir 4–0 in the quarter-finals and beat Pandurii Cerneți 2–1 in the final on 14 June 2025.

The county Cup win qualified CFR for the regional phase of the 2025–26 Cupa României. The club subsequently lost 2–6 to CS Sânandrei Timiș and was eliminated.

CFR entered Liga IV again in 2025–26 and played through the first half of the season, including a 3–2 win over Pandurii Cerneți on 22 November 2025.

The team did not resume the championship in spring 2026 and its autumn results were removed from the final table. The association itself was still included on the AJF Mehedinți list of affiliated members in September 2026, but it no longer fielded a senior team.

== Ground ==
The historic CFR Turnu Severin used several grounds during its existence. In the 1930s, the club played at the Dr. Angelescu Stadium in Turnu Severin. Contemporary local accounts record that CFR's final match there was a 4–0 victory over SSM Reșița in 1939, shortly before the club's promotion to Divizia B.

A new CFR Stadium was subsequently built for the railway club. The ground had a covered stand and was regarded locally as one of the better-equipped stadiums in the city at the time. CFR used the venue during its most successful period, which included promotion to Divizia A in 1941 and the club's 1942–43 Cupa României triumph.

After the senior football section was revived in 2023, CFR '43 initially played its Liga IV home matches at Schela-Ștrand in Drobeta-Turnu Severin. The ground is part of the Schela-Ștrand sports and leisure complex and is administered by the local authorities. CFR shared it with other local football teams during the 2023–24 season.

For the 2024–25 season, CFR '43 moved its home matches to the Stadionul Orășenesc in Strehaia, around 50 km from Drobeta-Turnu Severin. The move was caused by the shortage of available football grounds in the county capital.

== Honours ==
=== Original club ===
Divizia B

- Winners (1): 1940–41

Cupa României

- Winners (1): 1942–43

=== Revived club ===
Cupa României – Mehedinți County stage

- Winners (1): 2024–25

== League history ==
Season	Tier	Division	Place	Notes	Cupa României
2025–26	4	Liga IV (MH)	Withdrew	Withdrew during the winter break; results annulled	Regional phase
2024–25	4	Liga IV (MH)	3rd		County phase – Winners
2023–24	4	Liga IV (MH, Series I)	10th of 11	First senior eleven-a-side season since 1958	County phase
2018–23	No senior eleven-a-side team; futsal and youth activity				
1958–2018	Not active				
1957–58	3	Divizia C (Series III)	5th	Club dissolved after the season	Round of 32
1956	2	Divizia B (Series I)	13th (R)	Relegated	Round of 16
1955	2	Divizia B (Series I)	4th		Round of 32
1954	2	Divizia B	11th		
1953	2	Divizia B	5th		Round of 32
1952	2	Divizia B	8th		
1951	Regional	Regional Championship	—	As Locomotiva Turnu Severin	
1950	Regional	Regional Championship	—	As Locomotiva Turnu Severin	Round of 16
1948–49	2	Divizia B	11th (R)	Relegated	
1947–48	2	Divizia B (Series III)	4th		Quarter-finals
1946–47	2	Divizia B (Series I)	10th		Not held
1945–46	—	No national league	—		Not held
1944–45	—	No national league	—		Not held
1943–44	—	Wartime championship (unofficial)	7th	Competition abandoned	Round of 32 (competition abandoned)
1942–43	—	Campionatul de Război (unofficial)	5th		Winners
1941–42	—	No official national league	—	Cupa Basarabiei runners-up	Not held
1940–41	2	Divizia B (Series I)	1st (C, P)	Promoted to Divizia A	Round of 16
1939–40	2	Divizia B (Series II)	8th		
1938–39	Regional	Regional Championship	—		Round of 32
1937–38	Regional	Regional Championship	—		
1936–37	3	Divizia C	Withdrew	Results annulled	
1935–36	Regional	Regional Championship	—		
1934–35	Regional	Regional Championship	—		
1933–34	Regional	Regional Championship	—		
1932–33	Regional	Regional Championship	—		Not held
1931–32	Regional	Regional Championship	—		Not held
1930–31	Regional	Regional Championship	—		Not held
1929–30	Regional	Regional Championship	—		Not held
1928–29	Regional	Regional Championship	—	Club founded as Sborul Turnu Severin	Not held
