= Gloria CFR Galați =

Romanian football club

Gloria CFR Galaţi
- Full name: Gloria CFR Galaţi
- Short name: Gloria
- Founded: 1932 as ASC Galaţi
- Dissolved: 1970

Gloria CFR Galați was a Romanian football club based in Galați, Galați County. It was founded in 1932 and dissolved in 1970. The club managed to play two seasons in the Romanian top flight, achieving its best result of 10th place in the 1939–40 season.

== History ==
The club was founded in 1932 January 1, at the initiative of the railroad workers from Galați, after the merger of Șoimii Gloria (founded in 1927) with CFR. The initial colours of the jersey's were yellow-blue. The club's initial name was Asociația Sportivă și Culturală (lit. 'Cultural and Sports Association').

Until 1936 the team plays in the districtual championship after which it promotes to the Divizia C. One year later it qualifies to the Divizia B and after two more seasons, Gloria promotes to the Divizia A. At this level, it manages to play for two seasons, until 1941. In 1942, because of Second World War, the championship is interrupted, with the club on the 2nd position of the table.

In 1946, after the end of the war, Gloria CFR Galați narrowly missed an immediate return to Divizia A, losing the promotion play-off against Prahova Ploieşti 2–5 on aggregate. The club subsequently competed in Series II of Divizia B, finishing 9th in the 1946–47 season and improving to 7th place in 1947–48. Renamed CFR Galați in 1948, the team was moved to Series I, where it achieved another 7th-place finish in the 1948–49 campaign.

In 1950, the club adopted the name Locomotiva Galați. After ending the 1950 season in 10th place, the team was relegated to the regional championship following an 11th-place finish in 1951. Locomotiva managed to bounce back in 1954, winning the Galați Regional Championship and securing promotion back to the second division after finishing 2nd in the promotion tournament held in Ploiești. The squad included Manole, Tănase, Mogoș, Potolea, Tudorache, Bogdan, Duca, Simionescu, Zapis I, Mihăilescu, Păun, and Pavel.

In 1957, the club came back to its traditional name of Gloria CFR, but with no big success, not being able to pass the Divizia C where it was seen almost regularly, until 1970, after which it disappears.

Great players: J. Lăpușneanu, Justin Apostol, E. Prasler, Șt. Cucula, M. Rădulescu, I. Bodea, Șt. Cârjan, Guță Tănase, C. Comșa, M. Tudose, Zapis I, Zapis II, Ivanov, Ad. Popa, C. Voroncovchi.

== Honours ==
Divizia B:

- Winners (1): 1938–39

Divizia C:

- Winners (0):
- Runners-up (1): 1936–37

Galați Regional Championship:

- Winners (1): 1954

== Notable players ==
- Alexandru Tănase
- Manole Rădulescu
- Ion Lăpușneanu
- Justin Apostol
- Adrian Oprea
- Adrian Bontea
- Haralambie Antohi
- Adalbert Demeny
- Andrei Szutor
- Aurel Horotan
- Constantin Surugiu
- Constantin Jarca
- Constantin Bărbulescu
- Ernest Prassler
- Gheorghe Ionescu
- Gheorghe Iordăchescu
- Ioan Bodea
- Ioan Kiss
- Ştefan Cucula
- Ştefan Milea
- Ştefan Zapis
- Teofil Topa
- Tiberiu Kocsiardy
- Victor Mihăilescu
- Victor Pancoff
- Victor Setel
- Mircea Tudose
- Ladislau Strock 3
- Nicolae Găman
- Octavian Comşa

== Former managers ==
- (Romania) Ștefan Wetzer (1957–1959)
