= CSM Câmpia Turzii =

Romanian football club

- Full name: Clubul Sportiv Municipal; Câmpia Turzii
- Nickname: Sârma (The Wire)
- Short name: CSM
- Founded: 1921 as IS Câmpia Turzii; 2013 as IS 1921 Câmpia Turzii; 2017 as CSM Câmpia Turzii
- Dissolved: 2021
- Ground: Mihai Adam
- Capacity: 2,700
- 2019–20: Liga IV, Cluj County, 10th
| Home colours | Away colours |

Clubul Sportiv Municipal Câmpia Turzii was a Romanian professional football club from Câmpia Turzii, Cluj County, Romania, founded in 1921 and dissolved in 2021. Throughout the years, the club has had five other names, Metalul, Industria Sârmei, Energia, Mechel and Seso.

== History ==
The club was founded in 1921 as Industria Sârmei and played in the district and regional championship. In 1936–37 season played in Divizia C finishing 5th out of 6 in the Series II of the North League and in 1937–38 season won the promotion to Divizia B.

With the name of Metalul, the team from Campia Turzii, played for two years in the Liga I, their best performance being 12th place in the 1952 season.

It was the fifth club representing Divizia B which reached the Romanian Cup final, which was lost with 0–2 against Progresul Oradea.

In the summer of 2008 it changed its traditional name of Industria Sârmei Câmpia Turzii to Mechel Câmpia Turzii.

But this change proved to be disastrous, because at the end of the 2008–09 season the club was relegated to Liga III. Soon after it changed its name to Seso Câmpia Turzii.

The following seasons it missed the promotion back to Liga II by a hair pin, finishing 2nd in 2010 and 2011. In 2012 it finished 6th, and in 2013 7th.

In the summer of 2013 the club was dissolved.

During the same summer, the club was refounded as Industria Sârmei 1921 Câmpia Turzii.

As a result of financial problems, the club entered in a deadlock again in the winter of 2017, collapsing in the summer of 2017; it was refounded again, this time as CSM Câmpia Turzii.

== Chronology of names ==
| Name | Period |
|---|---|
| Industria Sârmei Câmpia Turzii | 1921–1950 |
| Metalul Câmpia Turzii | 1950–1956 |
| Energia Câmpia Turzii | 1956–1957 |
| Industria Sârmei Câmpia Turzii | 1957–2008 |
| Mechel Câmpia Turzii | 2008–2009 |
| Seso Câmpia Turzii | 2009–2013 |
| Industria Sârmei Câmpia Turzii | 2013–2017 |
| CSM Câmpia Turzii | 2017–2021 |

== Honours ==
=== Leagues ===
Liga I

- Best finish: 12th 1952

Liga II

- Winners (1): 1951
- Runners-up (7): 1938–39, 1940–41, 1947–48, 1953, 1955, 1961–62, 1964–65

Liga III

- Winners (4): 1937–38, 1971–72, 1977–78, 1981–82, 2000–01
- Runners-up (7): 1972–73, 1989–90, 1995–96, 1996–97, 1997–98, 2009–10, 2010–11

Liga IV – Cluj County

- Winners (2): 1992–93, 1994–95

=== Cups ===
Cupa României

- Runners-up (1): 1956

Cupa României – Cluj County

- Runners-up (1): 2018–19

== Former managers ==
- (Romania) Ion Bălănescu (1954)
- (Romania) Ștefan Wetzer (1961–1964)
- (Romania) Adrian Văsâi (2002–2003)
- (Romania) George Ciorceri (2004–2005)
- (Romania) Alpár Mészáros (2007–2008)
