= Liga II =

Association football league in Romania

- Organising body: FRF
- Founded: 1934
- Country: Romania
- Number of clubs: 22
- Level on pyramid: 2
- Promotion to: Liga I
- Relegation to: Liga III
- Domestic cup(s): Cupa României; Supercupa României
- Current champions: Corvinul Hunedoara (5th title) (2025–26)
- Most championships: Politehnica Timișoara (10 titles)
- Broadcasters: Digi Sport; Prima Sport
- Website: www.frf.ro
- Current: 2026–27 Liga II

Liga 2, commonly styled as Liga II, is the second level of the Romanian football league system. Established in 1934 as Divizia B, the competition was renamed Liga II ahead of the 2006–07 season. Since 2017, it has been sponsored by Casa Pariurilor and has officially been known as Liga 2 Casa Pariurilor.

== Format ==
For most of its history, the second tier was organised in several parallel series, generally divided on geographical criteria. A single national division was introduced for the 2016–17 season.

Since the 2024–25 season, Liga II has consisted of 22 teams. The competition is played in two phases: a regular season followed by a promotion play-off and a relegation play-out. The same format is in use for the 2026–27 season.

During the regular season, all 22 clubs play each other once, for a total of 21 matches per team. All points earned in the regular season are carried into the second phase.

The top six teams qualify for the promotion play-off, where they play each other home and away, adding ten matches. The top two teams are promoted directly to Liga I, while the teams finishing third and fourth enter two-legged promotion/relegation play-offs against the teams placed eighth and seventh, respectively, in the Liga I play-out.

The remaining 16 teams enter the play-out and are split into two groups of eight according to their regular-season positions. Group A contains the teams placed 7th, 10th, 11th, 14th, 15th, 18th, 19th and 22nd, while Group B contains those placed 8th, 9th, 12th, 13th, 16th, 17th, 20th and 21st. Each team plays the other seven teams in its group once. The bottom two teams in each group are relegated directly to Liga III, while the two sixth-placed teams contest a two-legged relegation play-off to determine the fifth relegated club.

== List of champions and promoted teams ==
Teams promoted are shown in bold or in the "Other teams promoted" column.

Year	Winners	Runners-up	Other teams promoted	Notes
1934–35	Maccabi București; Jiul Petroșani; Phoenix Baia Mare; SG Sibiu; Dacia Unirea Brăila	CFR Brașov; ILSA Timișoara; Tricolor Baia Mare; CFR Simeria; Franco-Româna Brăila	None	League play-off won by Jiul Petroșani. Promotion/relegation play-off won by AMEF Arad (last place in the 1934–35 Divizia A).
1935–36	Victoria Constanța; ILSA Timișoara; Phoenix Baia Mare; IAR Brașov; Franco-Româna Brăila	CFR Brașov; Rovine Grivița Craiova; Olimpia CFR Satu Mare; Șoimii Sibiu; Dacia Unirea Brăila	None	League play-off won by ILSA Timișoara. Promotion/relegation play-off won by Universitatea Cluj (last place in the 1935–36 Divizia A).
1936–37	**Sportul Studențesc București**; **Phoenix Baia Mare**	**CFR Brașov**; **Jiul Petroșani**	Dacia Unirea Brăila (3rd); Vulturii Textila Lugoj (3rd)	Six teams were promoted, while no team was relegated. The 1937–38 Divizia A was expanded to 20 teams, divided into two groups of ten.
1937–38	**Tricolor Ploiești**; **UD Reșița**	Victoria Constanța; CAM Timișoara	None	Two teams were promoted and ten were relegated. The 1938–39 Divizia A returned to a 12-team format.
1938–39	**Unirea Tricolor București**; **Gloria CFR Galați**; **CAM Timișoara**; Mureșul Târgu Mureș	Maccabi București; Dacia VA Galați; CA Oradea; IS Câmpia Turzii	None	Mureșul Târgu Mureș lost the promotion play-off; the other three series winners were promoted. Three teams were relegated.
1939–40	**FC Ploiești**; **Mica Brad**; Crișana Oradea; Franco-Româna Brăila	Mureșul Târgu Mureș; Minerul Lupeni; **Universitatea Cluj**; Feroemail Ploiești	FC Craiova (3rd); FC Brăila (4th); Gloria Arad (6th)	Workers' teams were banned. FC Brăila replaced Franco-Româna Brăila. FC Craiova and Gloria Arad replaced CAM Timișoara and AMEF Arad. Crișana Oradea was based in Oradea, which came under Hungarian administration in 1940.
1940–41	CFR Turnu Severin; Jiul Petroșani; Juventus București	SSM Reșița; IS Câmpia Turzii; Franco-Româna Brăila	None	The 1942 Heroes Cup was organised between the three Divizia B series winners and the 13 teams from the 1940–41 Divizia A. The Heroes Cup was unofficial because of the circumstances created by World War II.
1941–46	Two unofficial editions were played during World War II.			
1946–47	Unirea Tricolor București; FC Ploiești; Dermata Cluj	AMEF Arad; Textila Sfântu Gheorghe; Karres Mediaș		
1947–48	Dezrobirea Constanța; Metalochimic București; Politehnica Timișoara; Phoenix Baia Mare	Șoimii CFR Sibiu; Concordia Ploiești; CAM Timișoara; IS Câmpia Turzii		
1948–49	Șoimii CFR Sibiu; Unirea Tricolor București	ARLUS Bacău; Metalochimic Reșița		
1950	Unirea Tricolor București; Universitatea Cluj	Metalul București; CS Armata Cluj		
1951	CA Câmpulung Moldovenesc; Metalul Câmpia Turzii	Flacăra Moreni; Metalul Sibiu		
1952	Locomotiva București; Știința Timișoara	Locomotiva Iași; Flacăra Mediaș		
1953	Flacăra Ploiești; Metalul Hunedoara	Spartac București; Metalul Câmpia Turzii		
1954	Progresul București; Avântul Reghin; Locomotiva Constanța	Progresul Sibiu; Flacăra Mediaș; Dinamo Bacău		
1955	Locomotiva București; Progresul Oradea; Dinamo Bacău	Progresul Sibiu; Metalul Câmpia Turzii; Flacăra Poiana Câmpina		
1956	Recolta Târgu Mureș; Steagul Roșu Brașov	Energia Hunedoara; Progresul București		
1957–58	Știința Cluj; Farul Constanța	Corvinul Hunedoara; Dinamo Bacău		
1958–59	Minerul Lupeni; Tarom București	CFR Timișoara; Metalul Titanii București		
1959–60	CSMS Iași; Știința Timișoara; Corvinul Hunedoara	Dinamo Galați; Dinamo Obor București; CSM Baia Mare		
1960–61	Metalul Târgoviște; Dinamo Pitești; Jiul Petroșani	Dinamo Galați; Știința Craiova; CSM Baia Mare		
1961–62	CSMS Iași; Farul Constanța; Crișana Oradea	FCM Poiana Câmpina; CSM Reșița; IS Câmpia Turzii		
1962–63	Siderurgistul Galați; Dinamo Pitești; Crișul Oradea	Metalul Târgoviște; CSM Reșița; CFR Timișoara		
1963–64	Știința Craiova; Minerul Baia Mare	Metalul Târgoviște; CSM Reșița		
1964–65	Siderurgistul Galați; Știința Timișoara	Dinamo Bacău; IS Câmpia Turzii		
1965–66	Progresul București; Jiul Petrila	Știința București; Minerul Baia Mare		
1966–67	Dinamo Bacău; ASA Târgu Mureș	Siderurgistul Galați; Minerul Baia Mare		
1967–68	Politehnica Iași; Vagonul Arad	Politehnica Galați; Crișul Oradea		
1968–69	Steagul Roșu Brașov; CFR Cluj	Politehnica Galați; CSM Reșița		
1969–70	Progresul București; CFR Timișoara	Metalul Târgoviște; CSM Sibiu		
1970–71	ASA Târgu Mureș; Crișul Oradea	Sportul Studențesc București; Politehnica Timișoara		
1971–72	Sportul Studențesc București; CSM Reșița	Progresul București; Minerul Baia Mare		
1972–73	Politehnica Iași; Politehnica Timișoara	Metalul București; Bihor Oradea		
1973–74	FC Galați; Chimia Râmnicu Vâlcea; Olimpia Satu Mare	Gloria Buzău; Șoimii Sibiu; Bihor Oradea		
1974–75	Sport Club Bacău; Rapid București; Bihor Oradea	Progresul Brăila; Progresul București; Șoimii Sibiu		
1975–76	FCM Galați; Progresul București; Corvinul Hunedoara	FC Brăila; Dinamo Slatina; Șoimii Sibiu		
1976–77	Petrolul Ploiești; CS Târgoviște; Olimpia Satu Mare	Gloria Buzău; Steagul Roșu Brașov; Gloria Bistrița		
1977–78	Gloria Buzău; Chimia Râmnicu Vâlcea; FC Baia Mare	FCM Galați; Dinamo Slatina; CFR Cluj		
1978–79	FCM Galați; Viitorul Scornicești; Universitatea Cluj	Steagul Roșu Brașov; Metalul București; Gloria Bistrița		
1979–80	FCM Brașov; Progresul Vulcan București; Corvinul Hunedoara	FC Constanța; Rapid București; Bihor Oradea		
1980–81	FC Constanța; CS Târgoviște; UTA Arad	Gloria Bistrița; Petrolul Ploiești; Olimpia Satu Mare		
1981–82	Politehnica Iași; Petrolul Ploiești; Bihor Oradea	Gloria Bistrița; Rapid București; FC Baia Mare		
1982–83	Dunărea CSU Galați; Rapid București; FC Baia Mare	Gloria Buzău; Dinamo Victoria București; UTA Arad		
1983–84	Gloria Buzău; FCM Brașov; Politehnica Timișoara	Gloria Bistrița; Șoimii IPA Sibiu; Universitatea Cluj		
1984–85	Petrolul Ploiești; Dinamo Victoria București; Universitatea Cluj	Dunărea CSU Galați; Șoimii Sibiu; Gloria Bistrița		
1985–86	Oțelul Galați; Flacăra Moreni; Jiul Petroșani	Politehnica Iași; Progresul Vulcan București; FCM Baia Mare		
1986–87	CSM Suceava; ASA Târgu Mureș; Politehnica Timișoara	Politehnica Iași; Progresul Vulcan București; FCM Baia Mare		
1987–88	FC Constanța; Inter Sibiu; Bihor Oradea	Politehnica Iași; Jiul Petroșani; Gloria Bistrița		
1988–89	Petrolul Ploiești; Jiul Petroșani; Politehnica Timișoara	Progresul Brăila; Chimia Râmnicu Vâlcea; UTA Arad		
1989–90	**Progresul Brăila**; **Rapid București**; **Gloria Bistrița**	Gloria Buzău; AS Drobeta-Turnu Severin; UTA Arad	None	Three teams were promoted and replaced Olt Scornicești, Victoria București and Flacăra Moreni, which left the top flight.
1990–91	**Oțelul Galați**; **Electroputere Craiova**; **ASA Târgu Mureș**	Gloria Buzău; Chimia Râmnicu Vâlcea; CFR Timișoara	None	Three teams were promoted and three were relegated.
1991–92	**Progresul București**; **CSM Reșița**; **Universitatea Cluj**	Gloria CFR Galați; UTA Arad; FCM Baia Mare	None	Three teams were promoted and three were relegated.
1992–93	**Ceahlăul Piatra Neamț**; **UTA Arad**	Steaua Mizil; Bihor Oradea	None	Two teams were promoted and two were relegated.
1993–94	**Argeș Pitești**; **FCM Baia Mare**	Politehnica Iași; Unirea Alba Iulia	None	Two teams were promoted and two were relegated.
1994–95	**Selena Bacău**; **Politehnica Timișoara**	Dacia Unirea Brăila; Corvinul Hunedoara	Politehnica Iași (3rd) –––	Politehnica Iași won its promotion/relegation play-off. Dacia Unirea Brăila was not allowed to take part in the other play-off, which was won by Sportul Studențesc.
1995–96	**Oțelul Târgoviște**; **Jiul Petroșani**	Dacia Unirea Brăila; Foresta Fălticeni	None	Two teams were promoted and two were relegated.
1996–97	**Foresta Fălticeni**; **CSM Reșița**	Precizia Săcele; Electroputere Craiova	None	Two teams were promoted and two were relegated.
1997–98	**Astra Ploiești**; **Olimpia Satu Mare**	**FC Onești**; Electroputere Craiova	None	Three teams were promoted and three were relegated. FC Onești won the promotion play-off against Electroputere.
1998–99	**FC Brașov**; **Extensiv Craiova**	**Rocar București**; UTA Arad	None	Three teams were promoted and three were relegated. Rocar București won the promotion play-off against UTA Arad.
1999–00	**Foresta Suceava**; **Gaz Metan Mediaș**	Midia Năvodari; ARO Câmpulung	None	Two teams were promoted and four were relegated as Divizia A was reduced to 16 teams.
2000–01	**Sportul Studențesc București**; **UM Timișoara**	**Farul Constanța**; FC Baia Mare	None	Farul Constanța won its promotion/relegation play-off. FC Baia Mare also won its play-off but subsequently transferred its place in the 2001–02 Divizia A to FCM Bacău.
2001–02	**AEK București**; **UTA Arad**	Cimentul Fieni; FC Baia Mare	None	The promotion/relegation play-offs were won by Sportul Studențesc and Farul Constanța. Two teams were promoted and two were relegated.
2002–03	**Petrolul Ploiești**; **Apulum Alba Iulia**	Gloria Buzău; **Bihor Oradea**	None	The promotion/relegation play-offs were won by Bihor Oradea and AEK Timișoara. Petrolul Ploiești did not take up its promotion place following its merger with Astra, and Oțelul Galați remained in the top flight.
2003–04	**Politehnica Iași**; **Sportul Studențesc București**; **CFR Cluj**	FC Vaslui; Pandurii Târgu Jiu; Jiul Petroșani	None	Three teams were promoted and three were relegated.
2004–05	**FC Vaslui**; **Pandurii Târgu Jiu**; **Jiul Petroșani**	Midia Năvodari; FC Sibiu; Gaz Metan Mediaș	None	Three teams were promoted and three were relegated.
2005–06	**Ceahlăul Piatra Neamț**; **Universitatea Craiova**; Liberty Salonta	Forex Brașov; **Unirea Urziceni**; Bihor Oradea	UTA Arad (14th)	Liberty Salonta did not take up its promotion place; UTA Arad was admitted to the top flight instead. Unirea Urziceni won the promotion play-off against Bihor Oradea and Forex Brașov. Four teams eventually entered the top division and two were relegated.
2006–07	Delta Tulcea; **Universitatea Cluj**	**Gloria Buzău**; **Dacia Mioveni**	None	Delta Tulcea were denied a licence, so Ceahlăul Piatra Neamț, 15th in the 2006–07 Liga I, remained in the top flight. Three teams were promoted and three were relegated.
2007–08	**FC Brașov**; **Argeș Pitești**	**CS Otopeni**; **Gaz Metan Mediaș**	None	Four teams were promoted and four were relegated.
2008–09	**Ceahlăul Piatra Neamț**; **Unirea Alba Iulia**	**FC Ploiești**; **Internațional Curtea de Argeș**	None	Four teams were promoted and four were relegated.
2009–10	**Victoria Brănești**; **FCM Târgu Mureș**	**Sportul Studențesc București**; **Universitatea Cluj**	None	Four teams were promoted and four were relegated.
2010–11	**Ceahlăul Piatra Neamț**; **Petrolul Ploiești**	**Concordia Chiajna**; Bihor Oradea	Voința Sibiu (4th); CS Mioveni (3rd)	Bihor Oradea were denied a licence, so CS Mioveni were promoted instead. Voința Sibiu won the promotion play-off against Săgeata Năvodari.
2011–12	**CSM Studențesc Iași**; Politehnica Timișoara	**Viitorul Constanța**; **Gloria Bistrița**	––– Gaz Metan Severin (3rd)	Politehnica Timișoara did not obtain a licence, so Gaz Metan Severin were promoted instead. Four teams were promoted and four were relegated.
2012–13	**FC Botoșani**; **Corona Brașov**	**Săgeata Năvodari**; **ACS Poli Timișoara**	None	Four teams were promoted and four were relegated.
2013–14	**CSM Studențesc Iași**; **CS Universitatea Craiova**	**Rapid București**; **ASA 2013 Târgu Mureș**	None	Four teams were promoted and four were relegated.
2014–15	**FC Voluntari**; **ACS Poli Timișoara**	Academica Argeș; CS Mioveni	None	Two teams were promoted and six were relegated as Liga I was reduced to 14 teams.
2015–16	Rapid București; **Gaz Metan Mediaș**	Dunărea Călărași; UTA Arad	None	Two teams were promoted and two were relegated.
2016–17	**Juventus București**	**Sepsi Sfântu Gheorghe**	None	Two teams were promoted and two were relegated.
2017–18	**Dunărea Călărași**	**FC Hermannstadt**	None	Two teams were promoted and two were relegated.
2018–19	**Chindia Târgoviște**	**Academica Clinceni**	None	Two teams were promoted and two were relegated.
2019–20	**UTA Arad**	**Argeș Pitești**	None	Two teams were promoted and no team was relegated because the season was affected by the COVID-19 pandemic in Romania. Liga I was subsequently expanded back to 16 teams.
2020–21	**FC U Craiova**	**Rapid București**	**CS Mioveni**; **Farul Constanța** (7th)	Four teams entered the top flight and five were relegated. Farul Constanța subsequently merged with Liga I club Viitorul Constanța.
2021–22	**Petrolul Ploiești**	**Hermannstadt**	**Universitatea Cluj**	Three teams were promoted and five were relegated.
2022–23	**Politehnica Iași**	Steaua București	**Oțelul Galați**; **Dinamo București**	Three teams were promoted and five were relegated. Steaua București was not eligible for promotion because its legal form did not meet the requirements for participation in Liga I.
2023–24	**Unirea Slobozia**	Corvinul Hunedoara	**Gloria Buzău**	Two teams were promoted and four were relegated. Corvinul Hunedoara was not eligible for promotion because, at the time, the club's legal form did not meet the requirements for participation in Liga I.
2024–25	**Argeș Pitești**	Steaua București	**FK Csíkszereda Miercurea Ciuc**; **Metaloglobus București**	Three teams were promoted and five were relegated. Steaua București was again ineligible for promotion under the same legal-form requirements.
2025–26	**Corvinul Hunedoara**	**Sepsi Sfântu Gheorghe**	**Voluntari**	Corvinul Hunedoara and Sepsi Sfântu Gheorghe were promoted directly, while Voluntari won the promotion/relegation play-off. Three teams were promoted and five were relegated.

== Champions and promotions ==
195 titles have been awarded for winning the Liga II championship.
86 clubs have won at least one Liga II championship.

Club	Winners	Runners-up	Winning years
Politehnica Timișoara	10	1	1947–48, 1952, 1959–60, 1964–65, 1972–73, 1983–84, 1986–87, 1988–89, 1994–95, 2011–12
Politehnica Iași	9	4	1959–60, 1961–62, 1967–68, 1972–73, 1981–82, 2003–04, 2011–12, 2013–14, 2022–23
Petrolul Ploiești	9	1	1940–41, 1954, 1976–77, 1981–82, 1984–85, 1988–89, 2002–03, 2010–11, 2021–22
Jiul Petroșani	8	3	1934–35, 1940–41, 1960–61, 1965–66, 1985–86, 1988–89, 1995–96, 2004–05
Progresul București	6	6	1954, 1965–66, 1969–70, 1975–76, 1979–80, 1991–92
Rapid București	6	4	1952, 1955, 1974–75, 1982–83, 1989–90, 2015–16
Universitatea Cluj	6	3	1950, 1957–58, 1978–79, 1984–85, 1991–92, 2006–07
FC Brașov	6	2	1956, 1968–69, 1979–80, 1983–84, 1998–99, 2007–08
Bihor Oradea	5	8	1962–63, 1970–71, 1974–75, 1981–82, 1987–88
Corvinul Hunedoara	5	4	1953, 1959–60, 1975–76, 1979–80, 2025–26
Farul Constanța	5	2	1954, 1957–58, 1961–62, 1980–81, 1987–88
Argeș Pitești	5	1	1960–61, 1962–63, 1993–94, 2007–08, 2024–25
FCM Baia Mare	4	11	1963–64, 1977–78, 1982–83, 1993–94
UTA Arad	4	6	1980–81, 1992–93, 2001–02, 2019–20
CSM Reșița	4	5	1937–38, 1971–72, 1991–92, 1996–97
Sportul Studențesc București	4	3	1936–37, 1971–72, 2000–01, 2003–04
FCM Târgoviște	4	3	1960–61, 1976–77, 1980–81, 1995–96
FCM Bacău	4	3	1955, 1966–67, 1974–75, 1994–95
Dunărea Galați	4	3	1973–74, 1975–76, 1978–79, 1982–83
Ceahlăul Piatra Neamț	4	-	1992–93, 2005–06, 2008–09, 2010–11
ASA Târgu Mureș	4	-	1966–67, 1970–71, 1986–87, 1990–91
Unirea Tricolor București	4	-	1938–39, 1946–47, 1948–49, 1950
Phoenix Baia Mare	4	-	1934–35, 1935–36, 1936–37, 1947–48
Olimpia Satu Mare	3	2	1973–74, 1976–77, 1997–98
FC Ploiești	3	-	1937–38, 1939–40, 1946–47
Dacia Unirea Brăila	2	6	1934–35, 1989–90
Gloria Buzău	2	7	1977–78, 1983–84
Gaz Metan Mediaș	2	5	1999–00, 2015–16
Siderurgistul Galați	2	3	1962–63, 1964–65
FC Caracal	2	2	1990–91, 1998–99
Chimia Râmnicu Vâlcea	2	2	1973–74, 1977–78
Franco-Româna Brăila	2	2	1935–36, 1939–40
Universitatea Craiova	2	1	1963–64, 2013–14
Unirea Alba Iulia	2	1	2002–03, 2008–09
CFR Cluj	2	1	1968–69, 2003–04
Foresta Fălticeni	2	1	1996–97, 1999–00
Club Atletic Oradea	2	1	1955, 1961–62
Oțelul Galați	2	-	1985–86, 1990–91
FC U Craiova 1948	2	-	2005–06, 2020–21
Gloria Bistrița	1	8	1989–90
CSM Câmpia Turzii	1	7	1951
Șoimii Sibiu	1	7	1948–49
Faur București	1	4	1947–48
CFR Timișoara	1	3	1969–70
Victoria București	1	2	1984–85
CAM Timișoara	1	2	1938–39
Dunărea Călărași	1	1	2017–18
Poli Timișoara	1	1	2014–15
ASA 2013 Târgu Mureș	1	1	2009–10
Pandurii Târgu Jiu	1	1	2004–05
Sporting Vaslui	1	1	2004–05
Astra Giurgiu	1	1	1997–98
Flacăra Moreni	1	1	1985–86
Vagonul Arad	1	1	1967–68
Minerul Lupeni	1	1	1958–59
Mureșul Târgu Mureș	1	1	1938–39
Victoria Constanța	1	1	1935–36
ILSA Timișoara	1	1	1935–36
Maccabi București	1	1	1934–35
Unirea Slobozia	1	-	2023–24
Chindia Târgoviște	1	-	2018–19
Daco-Getica București	1	-	2016–17
FC Voluntari	1	-	2014–15
FC Botoșani	1	-	2012–13
Corona Brașov	1	-	2012–13
Victoria Brănești	1	-	2009–10
Delta Tulcea	1	-	2006–07
Liberty Oradea	1	-	2005–06
AEK București	1	-	2001–02
UM Timișoara	1	-	2000–01
Inter Sibiu	1	-	1987–88
CSM Suceava	1	-	1986–87
Olt Scornicești	1	-	1978–79
Tarom București	1	-	1958–59
CS Târgu Mureș	1	-	1956
Avântul Reghin	1	-	1954
CA Câmpulung Moldovenesc	1	-	1951
Dezrobirea Constanța	1	-	1947–48
Dermata Cluj	1	-	1946–47
CFR Turnu Severin	1	-	1940–41
Aurul Brad	1	-	1939–40
Crișana Oradea	1	-	1939–40
Gloria CFR Galați	1	-	1938–39
IAR Brașov	1	-	1935–36
Societatea Gimnastică Sibiu	1	-	1934–35

== See also ==
- Liga I
- Liga III
- Liga IV
- Cupa României
