= 1939–40 Divizia B =

Divizia B
- Season: 1939–40
- Country: Romania
- Teams: 40 (4x10)
- Promoted: Ploiești; Mica Brad; Universitatea Cluj; Craiova; Brăila; Gloria Arad
- Relegated: Astra-Metrom Brașov; SS Doc Galați; Victoria CFR Iași; Sparta Mediaș; Victoria Carei; Traian Tighina

The 1939–40 Divizia B was the sixth season of the second tier of the Romanian football league system.

The format has been maintained, four series of 10 teams. The winners of the series were supposed to promote in the Divizia A, but the winners of the 3rd and 4th series were not promoted from different reasons. Also 3rd and 4th place from the first series and the sixth place from the second series were promoted to fill the vacant places from Divizia A.

== Team changes ==
=== To Divizia B ===
Promoted from Divizia C

- Astra-Metrom Brașov
- CFR Turnu Severin
- Cimentul Turda
- Electrica Timișoara
- Feroemail Ploiești
- Maccabi Chișinău
- Mica Brad
- Muncitorul Cernăuți
- Oltul Sfântu Gheorghe
- Sparta Mediaș
- SS Doc Galați
- SSM Reșița

Relegated from Divizia A

- Chinezul Timișoara
- Tricolor Ploiești
- Gloria Arad

=== From Divizia B ===
Relegated to Divizia C

- CFR Brașov
- Luceafărul București
- Hatmanul Luca Arbore Radăuți
- Unirea MV Alba Iulia
- SG Sibiu
- Mociornița Colțea București
- Jahn Cernăuți
- Șoimii Sibiu
- Tricolor Baia Mare

Promoted to Divizia A

- CAM Timișoara
- Unirea Tricolor București
- Gloria CFR Galați

=== Renamed teams ===
Dacia Unirea Brăila was renamed as FC Brăila.

Monopol Târgu Mureș was renamed as CS Târgu Mureș.

Sporting Chișinău was renamed as Nistru Chișinău.

=== Disqualified teams ===
Mihai Viteazul Chișinău and Textila Moldova Iași were disqualified.

=== Other teams ===
Craiovan Craiova and Rovine Grivița Craiova merged, the new formed team was named FC Craiova.

== League tables ==
=== Serie I ===
Pos	Team	Pld	W	D	L	GF	GA	GD	Pts	Promotion or relegation
1	Ploiești (C, P)	18	13	2	3	68	15	+53	28	Promotion to Divizia A
2	Mureșul Târgu Mureș	18	12	2	4	56	26	+30	26	
3	Craiova (P)	18	12	2	4	41	22	+19	26	Promotion to Divizia A
4	Brăila (P)	18	11	4	3	39	23	+16	26	Promotion to Divizia A
5	CA Oradea	18	11	1	6	50	36	+14	23	
6	Constanța	18	6	0	12	35	51	−16	12	
7	Dragoș Vodă Cernăuți	18	5	2	11	27	44	−17	12	
8	Nistru Chișinău	18	5	2	11	28	49	−21	12	
9	Astra-Metrom Brașov (R)	18	2	3	13	17	51	−34	7	Relegation to Divizia C
10	Victoria CFR Iași (R)	18	0	0	18	3	71	−68	0	Relegation to Divizia C

Source: romaniansoccer.ro
Rules for classification: 1) Points 2) Head-to-head points; 3) Head-to-head goal difference; 4) Head-to-head goals scored; 5) Head-to-head away goals scored; 6) Goal difference; 7) Goals scored.
(C) Champions; (P) Promoted; (R) Relegated

=== Serie II ===
Pos	Team	Pld	W	D	L	GF	GA	GD	Pts	Promotion or relegation
1	Mica Brad (C, P)	18	13	1	4	45	19	+26	27	Promotion to Divizia A
2	Minerul Lupeni	18	11	2	5	27	16	+11	24	
3	Electrica Timișoara	18	11	1	6	31	26	+5	23	
4	Chinezul Timișoara	18	10	0	8	39	34	+5	20	
5	Vulturii Textila Lugoj	18	9	2	7	26	25	+1	20	
6	Gloria Arad (P)	18	8	4	6	45	32	+13	20	Promotion to Divizia A
7	Jiul Petroșani	18	7	4	7	31	22	+9	18	
8	CFR Turnu Severin	18	7	1	10	23	37	−14	15	
9	CFR Simeria	18	3	3	12	13	30	−17	9	
10	Sparta Mediaș (R)	18	1	2	15	10	49	−39	4	Relegation to Divizia C

Source: romaniansoccer.ro
Rules for classification: 1) Points 2) Head-to-head points; 3) Head-to-head goal difference; 4) Head-to-head goals scored; 5) Head-to-head away goals scored; 6) Goal difference; 7) Goals scored.
(C) Champions; (P) Promoted; (R) Relegated

=== Serie III ===
Pos	Team	Pld	W	D	L	GF	GA	GD	Pts	Promotion or relegation
1	Crișana Oradea (Note: Crișana Oradea was not promoted. On 30 August 1940 the Second Vienna Award was signed and territory of Northern Transylvania was assigned from Romania to Hungary, including Oradea.) (C)	18	14	3	1	52	12	+40	31	Promotion to Divizia A
2	Universitatea Cluj (Note: Universitatea Cluj was promoted instead of Crișana Oradea. Even that the Second Vienna Award regard also Cluj-Napoca in the territory of Northern Transylvania, Universitatea Cluj refused to play in Hungary and relocated to Sibiu.) (P)	18	14	1	3	63	22	+41	29	Promotion to Divizia A
3	SSM Reșița	18	11	1	6	41	19	+22	23	
4	Oltul Sfântu Gheorghe	18	8	6	4	37	17	+20	22	
5	IS Câmpia Turzii	18	8	3	7	35	28	+7	19	
6	Cimentul Turda	18	7	3	8	34	36	−2	17	
7	Stăruința Oradea	18	6	2	10	25	40	−15	14	
8	Olimpia CFR Satu Mare	18	6	1	11	27	44	−17	13	
9	CS Târgu Mureș	18	4	4	10	21	46	−25	12	
10	Victoria Carei (Note: Victoria Carei withdrew at the start of the second half and lost the remaining 9 matches with 0–3.) (R)	18	0	0	18	5	76	−71	0	Relegation to Divizia C

Source: romaniansoccer.ro
Rules for classification: 1) Points 2) Head-to-head points; 3) Head-to-head goal difference; 4) Head-to-head goals scored; 5) Head-to-head away goals scored; 6) Goal difference; 7) Goals scored.
(C) Champions; (P) Promoted; (R) Relegated

=== Serie IV ===
Pos	Team	Pld	W	D	L	GF	GA	GD	Pts	Promotion or relegation
1	Franco-Româna Brăila (C)	18	15	2	1	69	20	+49	32	Promotion to Divizia A
2	Feroemail Ploiești	18	13	3	2	65	16	+49	29	
3	Maccabi București	18	12	2	4	58	13	+45	26	
4	Prahova Ploiești	18	9	3	6	37	35	+2	21	
5	Dacia VA Galați	18	9	2	7	44	42	+2	20	
6	Maccabi Chișinău	18	7	2	9	30	42	−12	16	
7	Turda București	18	6	3	9	32	33	−1	15	
8	Muncitorul Cernăuți	18	6	1	11	26	53	−27	13	
9	SS Doc Galați (R)	18	3	0	15	19	70	−51	6	Relegation to Divizia C
10	Traian Tighina (R)	18	1	0	17	9	65	−56	2	Relegation to Divizia C

Source: romaniansoccer.ro
Rules for classification: 1) Points 2) Head-to-head points; 3) Head-to-head goal difference; 4) Head-to-head goals scored; 5) Head-to-head away goals scored; 6) Goal difference; 7) Goals scored.
(C) Champions; (R) Relegated

== See also ==
- 1939–40 Divizia A
