= 1934–35 Cupa României =

Tournament details
- Country: Romania
- Teams: 68

Final positions
- Champions: CFR București
- Runners-up: Ripensia Timișoara

Tournament statistics
- Matches played: 31
- Goals scored: 136 (4.39 per match)

The 1934–35 Cupa României was the second season in the history of Romania's most prestigious football cup competition.

The surprise of the tournament was ILSA Timișoara, a team from Divizia B which reached the semifinals. Rudolf Wetzer was player-manager for ILSA in the Cup.

The trophy was claimed by CFR București who defeated holders Ripensia Timișoara after extra time.

== Format ==
The competition is an annual knockout tournament with pairings for each round drawn at random.

There are no seeds for the draw. The draw also determines which teams will play at home. Each tie is played as a single leg.

If a match is drawn after 90 minutes, the game goes in extra time, and if the scored is still tight after 120 minutes, there a replay will be played, usually at the ground of the team who were away for the first game.

From the first edition, the teams from Divizia A entered in competition in sixteen finals, rule which remained till today.

The format is quite similar to the oldest recognised football tournament in the world, the FA Cup.

== Bracket ==
Round of 32
SG Sibiu	4
Maccabi Cernăuți	0
CFR Simeria	2
CFR București	4
Dacia Unirea IG Brăila	2
Phoenix Baia Mare	3
CA Timișoara	2
Crișana Oradea	0
AMEF Arad	2
ILSA Timișoara	4
Unirea Tricolor București	6
Mureşul Târgu Mureş	1
Vulturii Textila Lugoj	0
ASCAM București	1
Tricolor Baia Mare	2
RGM Timișoara	1
Jahn Cernăuți	0
CA Oradea	4
Vitrometan Mediaș	0
Chinezul Timișoara	6
Ripensia Timișoara	4
AS CFR Brașov	1
Universitatea Cluj	8
Elpis Constanța	0
Gloria Arad	0
Prahova Ploiești	2
Venus București	3
Olimpia CFR Satu Mare	1
Societatea Sportivă Sibiu	0
Juventus București	3
Maccabi București	0
România Cluj	1

Round of 16
Societatea Gimnastică Sibiu	1
CFR București	4
Phoenix Baia Mare	1
CA Timișoara	0
ILSA Timișoara	1
Unirea Tricolor București	0
ASCAM București	4
Tricolor Baia Mare	1
CA Oradea	4
Chinezul Timișoara	1
Ripensia Timișoara	2
Universitatea Cluj	1
Prahova Ploiești	2
Venus București	6
Juventus București	2
România Cluj	0

Quarter-finals
CFR București	4
Phoenix Baia Mare	2
ILSA Timișoara	4
ASCAM București	1
CA Oradea	1
Ripensia Timișoara	2
Venus București	3
Juventus București	0

Semi-finals
CFR București	3
ILSA Timișoara	2
Ripensia Timișoara	4
Venus București	2

Final
CFR București (a.e.t.)	6
Ripensia Timișoara	5

== First round proper ==
Team 1	Score	Team 2
3 March 1935
AMEF Arad (Div. A)	2–4	(Div. B) ILSA Timișoara
17 March 1935
Societatea Gimnastică Sibiu (Div. B)	4–0	(District) Maccabi Cernăuți
24 March 1935
Universitatea Cluj (Div. A)	8–0	(Div. B) Elpis Constanța
Vitrometan Mediaș (Div. B)	0–6	(Div. A) Chinezul Timișoara
Jahn Cernăuți (Div. B)	0–4	(Div. A) CA Oradea
Societatea Sportivă Sibiu (Div. B)	0–3	(Div. A) Juventus București
CA Timișoara (Div. B)	2–0	(Div. A) Crișana Oradea
Gloria Arad (Div. A)	0–2	(Div. B) Prahova Ploiești
Maccabi București (Div. B)	0–1	(Div. A) România Cluj
Vulturii Textila Lugoj (Div. B)	0–1	(District) ASCAM București
Venus București (Div. A)	3–1	(Div. B) Olimpia CFR Satu Mare
CFR Simeria (Div. B)	2–4	(Div. A) CFR București
Tricolor Baia Mare (Div. B)	2–1	(Div. B) RGM Timișoara
Dacia Unirea IG Brăila (Div. B)	2–3	(Div. B) Phoenix Baia Mare
28 March 1935
Ripensia Timișoara (Div. A)	4–1	(Div. B) AS CFR Brașov
4 April 1935
Unirea Tricolor București (Div. A)	6–1	(Div. B) Mureşul Târgu Mureş

== Second round proper ==
Team 1	Score	Team 2
6 April 1935
Juventus București	2–0	România Cluj
7 April 1935
Phoenix Baia Mare	1–0	CA Timișoara
CA Oradea	4–1	Chinezul Timișoara
ASCAM București	4–1	Tricolor Baia Mare
Societatea Gimnastică Sibiu	1–4	CFR București
Prahova Ploiești	2–6	Venus București
Ripensia Timișoara	2–1	Universitatea Cluj
18 April 1935
ILSA Timișoara	1–0	Unirea Tricolor București

== Quarter-finals ==
Team 1	Score	Team 2
23 April 1935
Venus București	3–0	Juventus București
ILSA Timișoara	4–1	ASCAM București
CFR București	4–2	Phoenix Baia Mare
CA Oradea	1–2	Ripensia Timișoara

== Semi-finals ==
Team 1	Score	Team 2
30 May 1935
CFR București	3–2	ILSA Timișoara
Ripensia Timișoara	4–2	Venus București

== Final ==
6 June 1935
18:00 EET

CFR București	6–5 (a.e.t.)	Ripensia Timișoara
Junk 34'; Ströck 37'; Georgescu 55', 61', 70'; Barbu 97'	Report	Schwartz 41', 47'; Dobay 66'; Zombory 76'; Ujlaki 88' (o.g.)

ONEF, Bucharest
Attendance: 20,000
Referee: Denis Xifando (Bucharest)

Cupa României 1934–35 winners

1st title
