= 1937–38 Divizia C =

Third tier Romanian football league

Divizia C
- Season: 1937–38

The 1937–38 Divizia C was the 2nd season of Liga III, the third tier of the Romanian football league system.

== Team changes ==
=== To Divizia C ===
Relegated from Divizia B

- —

Promoted from Regional Championship

- Solvay Uioara
- Congri Gherla
- Salina Uioara
- Aurum Baia Mare
- Oșana
- CFR Satu Mare
- Triumf Giurgiu
- Sporting Club Pitești
- Metalosport Galați
- Viitorul Dristor Silistra
- US Arad
- Metalosport Ferdinand
- Lonea
- Metalosport Călan
- SM Craiova
- Zborul Turnu Severin
- Menopol Târgu Mureș
- Geamul Mediaș
- Macabi Hakoah Cernăuți
- Muncitorul Cernăuți
- Macabi Cernăuți
- CFR Cernăuți
- Ateneul Tătărași Iași
- Unirea CFR Pașcani
- Macabi Bălți
- Venus Botoșani
- Jahn Rădăuți
- Mihai Viteazul Chișinău
- CFR Timișoara
- Fratelia Timișoara
- Galvani Timișoara
- Olimpia București
- AGER București
- Mociornița București
- ST București
- Colțea București
- Stăruința Oradea
- Electrica Oradea

=== From Divizia C ===
Promoted to Divizia B

- Tricolor Baia Mare
- Telefon Club București
- UD Reșița
- SG Sibiu
- Hatmanul Luca Arbore Rădăuți
- Gloria CFR Galați
- Prahova Ploiești

Relegated to Regional Championship

- —

=== Disqualified teams ===
- Brașovia Brașov retired because of financial problems

== League tables ==
=== North League ===
Series I

Pos	Team	Pld	W	D	L	GF	GA	GD	Pts	Qualification or relegation
1	Industria Sârmei Câmpia Turzii (C, P)	16	9	6	1	27	12	+15	24	Promotion to Divizia B
2	Uzinele Electrice Cluj	16	11	1	4	21	15	+6	23	
3	CA Cluj	16	9	4	3	39	19	+20	22	
4	CFR Cluj	16	8	4	4	39	25	+14	20	
5	Solvay Uioara	16	6	4	6	34	27	+7	16	
6	Congri Gherla	16	5	1	10	28	32	−4	11	
7	Arieșul Turda	16	5	1	10	20	40	−20	11	
8	Ceramica Bistrița	16	4	1	11	17	30	−13	9	
9	Salina Uioara	16	3	2	11	18	43	−25	8	

Source: romaniansoccer.ro
Rules for classification: 1) Points; 2) Goal difference; 3) Number of goals scored.
(C) Champions; (P) Promoted

Series II

Pos	Team	Pld	W	D	L	GF	GA	GD	Pts
1	Electrica Oradea	16	13	1	2	41	11	+30	27
2	Barkohba Satu Mare	16	12	0	4	38	22	+16	24
3	Aurum Baia Mare	16	9	3	4	45	20	+25	21
4	Oșana	16	8	3	5	22	18	+4	19
5	CFR Satu Mare	16	6	6	4	35	31	+4	18
6	Stăruința Satu Mare	16	7	2	7	34	30	+4	16
7	Maramureșul Sighet	16	4	2	10	13	39	−26	10
8	Vestul Oradea	16	2	1	13	14	43	−29	5
9	CS Salonta	16	1	2	13	13	41	−28	4

Source: romaniansoccer.ro
Rules for classification: 1) Points; 2) Goal difference; 3) Number of goals scored.

=== South League ===
Series I

Pos	Team	Pld	W	D	L	GF	GA	GD	Pts	Qualification or relegation
1	Turda București (C, P)	16	13	2	1	61	15	+46	28	Promotion to Divizia B
2	Olimpia București	16	11	3	2	54	20	+34	25	
3	AGER București	16	10	4	2	47	18	+29	24	
4	Triumf Giurgiu	16	8	1	7	36	25	+11	17	
5	Oltul Turnu Măgurele	16	8	1	7	29	28	+1	17	
6	Avântul Buzău	16	5	1	10	20	38	−18	11	
7	Venus Câmpina	16	4	2	10	35	54	−19	10	
8	Sporting Club Pitești	16	3	0	13	15	46	−31	6	
9	Radu Negru CFR Pitești	16	3	0	13	6	39	−33	6	

Source: romaniansoccer.ro
Rules for classification: 1) Points; 2) Goal difference; 3) Number of goals scored.
(C) Champions; (P) Promoted

Series II

Pos	Team	Pld	W	D	L	GF	GA	GD	Pts	Qualification or relegation
1	Mociornița București (P)	14	11	1	2	47	16	+31	23	Promotion to Divizia B
2	Tricolor Venus Călărași	14	9	1	4	41	20	+21	19	
3	ST București	14	9	1	4	32	24	+8	19	
4	Colțea București	14	9	0	5	37	25	+12	18	
5	Metalosport Galați	14	7	2	5	35	22	+13	16	
6	Viitorul Dristor Silistra	14	3	3	8	19	37	−18	9	
7	VTM Brăila	14	4	0	10	14	36	−22	8	
8	Gloria Venera CFR Bazargic	14	0	0	14	2	47	−45	0	

Source: romaniansoccer.ro
Rules for classification: 1) Points; 2) Goal difference; 3) Number of goals scored.
(P) Promoted

=== West League ===
Series I

Pos	Team	Pld	W	D	L	GF	GA	GD	Pts
1	SSMR Reșița	18	13	2	3	49	21	+28	28
2	Electrica Timișoara	18	11	4	3	50	23	+27	26
3	Banatul Timișoara	18	11	2	5	39	23	+16	24
4	Olimpia PTT Arad	18	11	2	5	37	29	+8	24
5	CFR Timișoara	18	10	3	5	40	35	+5	23
6	Fratelia Timișoara	18	7	5	6	30	26	+4	19
7	Galvani Timișoara	18	7	4	7	32	27	+5	18
8	Politehnica Timișoara	18	4	0	14	18	47	−29	8
9	US Arad	18	3	2	13	14	41	−27	8
10	Progresul Timișoara	18	1	0	17	10	47	−37	2

Source: romaniansoccer.ro
Rules for classification: 1) Points; 2) Goal difference; 3) Number of goals scored.

Series II

Pos	Team	Pld	W	D	L	GF	GA	GD	Pts	Qualification or relegation
1	Minerul Lupeni (C, P)	14	11	3	0	57	12	+45	25	Promotion to Divizia B
2	Mica Brad	14	9	4	1	31	15	+16	22	
3	Metalosport Ferdinand	14	7	3	4	28	20	+8	17	
4	Lonea	14	7	3	4	40	22	+18	17	
5	Metalosport Călan	14	6	3	5	31	30	+1	15	
6	SM Craiova	14	4	2	8	25	38	−13	10	
7	CSM Lugoj	14	3	0	11	15	46	−31	6	
8	Zborul Turnu Severin	14	0	0	14	3	47	−44	0	

Source: romaniansoccer.ro
Rules for classification: 1) Points; 2) Goal difference; 3) Number of goals scored.
(C) Champions; (P) Promoted

=== Central League ===
Series I

Pos	Team	Pld	W	D	L	GF	GA	GD	Pts	Qualification or relegation
1	Menopol Târgu Mureș (C, P)	22	16	4	2	52	19	+33	36	Promotion to Divizia B
2	Sparta Mediaș	22	15	3	4	53	19	+34	33	
3	Klinger Sfântu Gheorghe	22	15	2	5	56	22	+34	32	
4	Astra Brașov	22	14	3	5	43	28	+15	31	
5	CS Târgu Mureș	22	13	5	4	54	25	+29	31	
6	Patria Diciosânmartin	22	13	2	7	49	15	+34	28	
7	Vitrometan Mediaș	22	13	1	8	42	32	+10	27	
8	Acvila CFR Sighișoara	22	7	4	11	30	38	−8	18	
9	Fraternitas Tălmaciu	22	4	2	16	17	58	−41	10	
10	SS Sibiu	22	1	5	16	10	52	−42	7	
11	CS Blaj	22	2	2	18	8	69	−61	6	
12	Geamul Mediaș	22	2	1	19	21	58	−37	5	

Source: romaniansoccer.ro
Rules for classification: 1) Points; 2) Goal difference; 3) Number of goals scored.
(C) Champions; (P) Promoted

=== East League ===
Series I

Pos	Team	Pld	W	D	L	GF	GA	GD	Pts	Qualification or relegation
1	Traian Tighina (C, P)	14	11	1	2	45	17	+28	23	Promotion to Divizia B
2	Mihai Viteazul Chișinău (P)	14	10	2	2	42	20	+22	22	Promotion to Divizia B
3	Macabi Hakoah Cernăuți	14	10	1	3	27	11	+16	21	
4	Macabi Chișinău	14	5	3	6	28	19	+9	13	
5	Ateneul Tătărași Iași	14	4	3	7	16	22	−6	11	
6	Unirea CFR Pașcani	14	4	2	8	28	30	−2	10	
7	Victoria CFR Iași	14	4	2	8	16	22	−6	10	
8	Macabi Bălți	14	1	0	13	7	66	−59	2	

Source: romaniansoccer.ro
Rules for classification: 1) Points; 2) Goal difference; 3) Number of goals scored.
(C) Champions; (P) Promoted

Series II

Pos	Team	Pld	W	D	L	GF	GA	GD	Pts
1	Muncitorul Cernăuți	12	11	1	0	54	17	+37	23
2	Cetatea Sucevei Suceava	12	7	1	4	24	26	−2	15
3	Macabi Cernăuți	12	6	3	3	38	26	+12	15
4	Dovbuș Cernăuți	12	5	5	2	37	27	+10	15
5	CFR Cernăuți	12	4	0	8	44	31	+13	8
6	Venus Botoșani	12	3	1	8	15	26	−11	7
7	Jahn Rădăuți	12	0	1	11	11	70	−59	1

Source: romaniansoccer.ro
Rules for classification: 1) Points; 2) Goal difference; 3) Number of goals scored.

== See also ==
- 1937–38 Divizia A
- 1937–38 Divizia B
- 1937–38 Cupa României
