= Eugen Lakatos =

Romanian footballer

Personal information
- Date of birth: 24 October 1912
- Place of birth: Zichy, Austria-Hungary
- Date of death: 18 February 1949 (aged 36)
- Place of death: Timișoara, Romania
- Position: Midfielder

Youth career
- Chinezul Timișoara

Senior career*
Years	Team	Apps	(Gls)
1925–1930	Chinezul Timișoara (Note: Only the statistics for the 1925–26 and 1926–27 Divizia A seasons are available.)	19	(0)
1930–1931	UD Reșița		
1932–1937	Ripensia Timișoara	70	(6)
1937–1938	Tricolor Ploiești		
1938–1943	UD Reșița (Note: The Divizia A 1940–41 was the last season before World War II and the Divizia A 1946–47 was the first one after, so the appearances during this period for UD Reșița are not official.)	42	(2)
Total		131	(8)

International career
1932–1933	Romania	6	(0)
- * Club domestic league appearances and goals

Eugen Lakatos (24 October 1912 – 18 February 1949) was a Romanian footballer who played as a midfielder.

== Club career ==
Lakatos was born on 24 October 1912 in Zichy, Austria-Hungary. While he was a child his family moved to Timișoara, Romania where he grew up in the Ronaț neighborhood. He began playing junior-level football at Chinezul Timișoara. In 1925 when he was around the age of 13 he started to play senior level football for Chinezul. At the end of his first season he helped the club win the title, being used by coach Frontz Dőme in 15 matches in the regional and national championship together, including the entire match in the 3–0 win over Juventus București in the national championship final. After the game, the Gazeta Sporturilor newspaper described him as "excelling in brutal play" but also noted that he "managed to stop any action of the Bucharest wingers". He would win another title with Chinezul in the following season, but this time coaches Dőme and Jenő Konrád used him in only four matches. For the 1930–31 season he went to play for UD Reșița where under coach Ernest Loukota he helped them win the championship, scoring both goals of the 2–0 victory against Societatea Gimnastică Sibiu in the final.

Afterwards, Lakatos joined Ripensia Timișoara where his first Divizia A match for them took place on 11 September 1932 in a 3–2 away loss to CFR București. He won the title in his first season, with coach Jenő Konrád using him in 14 games in which he scored two goals, including playing in the final against Universitatea Cluj. In the following season he helped the team reach the 1934 Cupa României final, playing in their first victory over "U" Cluj, winning the cup. In the 1934–35 season he won another title, coaches Josef Uridil and Rudolf Wetzer giving him 19 appearances, also the team reached the Cupa României final where he played the entire match in the 6–5 loss to CFR București. Next season, Lakatos helped Ripensia win The Double, netting two goals in the 18 appearances given to him by coaches Wetzer and Konrád, and he played in the 5–1 win over Unirea Tricolor București in the Cupa României final. In the following Cupa României edition, the team reached another final, but he did not play in the 5–1 loss to Rapid București.

Afterwards he went to play for Tricolor Ploiești during the 1937–38 Divizia B season, helping them get promoted to the first league by the end of it. Then he made a comeback to UD Reșița in Divizia A football where he played until his retirement in 1943.

== International career ==
Lakatos made six appearances for Romania, making his debut on 2 October 1932 under coach Constantin Rădulescu in a 5–0 friendly loss to Poland. He played in three victories against Bulgaria, Greece and Yugoslavia in the conquest of the 1933 Balkan Cup. Lakatos also played in a 5–1 win over rivals Hungary in the 1931–1934 Central European Cup for Amateurs which was another tournament won by Romania. His last match for the national team was a 2–2 draw against Switzerland in the 1934 World Cup qualifiers.

== Death ==
Lakatos died on 18 February 1949 at age 36 in Timișoara.

== Honours ==
Chinezul Timișoara

- Divizia A: 1925–26, 1926–27

UD Reșița

- Divizia A: 1930–31

Ripensia Timișoara

- Divizia A: 1932–33, 1934–35, 1935–36, runner-up 1933–34
- Cupa României: 1933–34, 1935–36, runner-up 1934–35, 1936–37

Tricolor Ploiești

- Divizia B: 1937–38

Romania

- Balkan Cup: 1933
- Central European International Cup: 1931–34
