= Emerich Vogl =

Romanian footballer

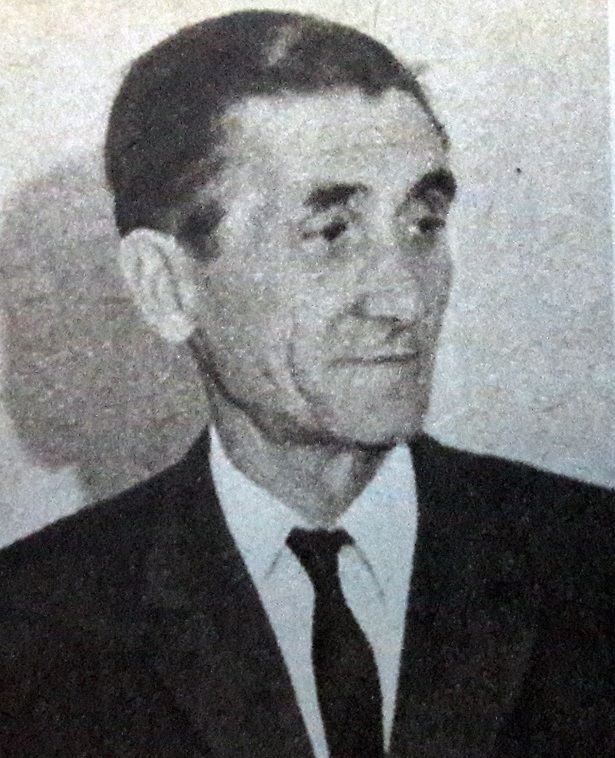

Personal information
- Full name: Emerich Vogl
- Date of birth: 12 August 1905
- Place of birth: Temesvár, Austria-Hungary (now Romania)
- Date of death: 29 October 1971 (aged 66)
- Place of death: Bucharest, Romania
- Height: 1.74 m (5 ft 9 in)
- Positions: Defender; midfielder

Youth career
- 1921–1922: Chinezul Timișoara

Senior career*
Years	Team	Apps	(Gls)
1922–1929	Chinezul Timișoara (Note: Only the statistics for the 1925–26 and 1926–27 Divizia A seasons are available.)	31	(21)
1929–1937	Juventus București	120	(9)
Total		151	(30)

International career
1924–1934	Romania	29	(1)

Managerial career
- 1931–1932: Juventus București
- 1934: Juventus București
- 1943: Juventus București
- 1943: Romania
- 1946–1949: Juventus București
- 1949: Romania
- 1950–1952: Romania
- * Club domestic league appearances and goals

Emerich Vogl (12 August 1905 – 29 October 1971) was a Romanian football player and coach of Banat Swabian ethnicity, who was a member of the Romania national team that participated in the 1930 World Cup in Uruguay and the 1934 edition in Italy.

== Club career ==
Vogl was born on 12 August 1905 in Temesvár, Austria-Hungary, growing up in the Mehala neighborhood, then playing as a youth for local club Chinezul between 1921 and 1922. In 1922, at age 17, Vogl made his debut for the senior team and until 1924 he played on different positions, before settling as a central midfielder. He played for Chinezul until 1929, winning five Divizia A titles with them. For the 1925–26 title, he scored 15 goals in the regional and national championship combined, being the team's second top-scorer after Augustin Semler who scored 41. Around this time he was considered by the press to be the best central midfielder in Europe, being appreciated for his technical abilities and his physical condition, at one point winning a local 800 metres running competition.

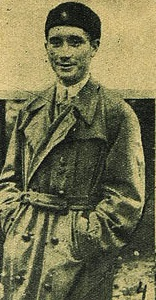
Vogl in the Chilean sports magazine Los Sports in 1930

In 1929, together with his teammate László Raffinsky he went to Juventus București. Vogl made his debut for them under coach Gyula Feldmann on 13 October in a 1–0 home victory against Venus București in the regional championship, scoring his first goal on 3 November in a 1–0 away win over Maccabi București. Juventus won the regional championship, thus qualifying for the national championship which was won after a 3–0 victory in the final against Gloria Arad. Vogl was being used by coaches Feldmann and György Hlavay in all 14 matches during the campaign, having one goal scored. In the following seven years, Vogl appeared regularly for the team, and helped it gain promotion to Divizia A by the end of the 1932–33 season. He also had two spells as a player-coach for them. The highlights of these years were a third place in the 1935–36 season and reaching two times in a row the Cupa României semi-finals.

== International career ==
Vogl played 29 games and scored one goal for Romania. He made his debut on 31 August 1924 under coach Teofil Moraru in an away friendly against Czechoslovakia which ended with a 4–1 loss. In his third match for the national team, Vogl was named the team captain in a 3–1 away win in a friendly over Turkey. He scored his only goal in an 8–1 victory against Greece during the successful 1929–31 Balkan Cup.

He was selected by coach Constantin Rădulescu to be part of the squad for the 1930 World Cup, but the chairman of Astra Română, a company where Vogl and his teammate László Raffinsky were office workers, forbade the two players from leaving their workplace. Eventually, after the Romanian Football Federation's secretary Octav Luchide went to the company with a letter from King Carol II, they were allowed to participate. Vogl played in both Group 3 matches at that World Cup, a 3–1 win over Peru and a 4–0 loss to hosts and eventual world champions Uruguay. Afterwards he helped the team win two competitions. The first was the 1933 Balkan Cup where he appeared in all three matches and the second was the 1931–34 Central European Cup for Amateurs where he played five games. Vogl played two games in the successful 1934 World Cup qualifiers, being selected by coaches Josef Uridil and Rădulescu to be part of the final tournament squad. There, he played and captained the team for the last time in a first round exit as they were defeated with 2–1 by eventual finalists, Czechoslovakia.

=== International goals ===
Scores and results list Romania's goal tally first. "Score" column indicates the score after each Emerich Vogl goal.

#	Date	Venue	Opponent	Score	Result	Competition
1.	25 May 1930	ONEF Stadium, Bucharest, Romania	Greece	3–1	8–1	1929–31 Balkan Cup

== Managerial career ==
Vogl's first coaching experience was when he replaced Rudolf Wetzer at Juventus București for the second half of the 1930–31 regional championship, being a player-coach. He took the club from the third place and finished in second with only one point below winners Unirea Tricolor București. In the following season he finished in fourth place. Then in the 1932–33 edition he led them in the first half and finished first, but was replaced with Ladislau Csillag for the second half who kept the team on the lead position, earning the promotion to Divizia A. He was player-coach again when he replaced Csillag for the second half of the 1933–34 season, making his Divizia A debut in a 3–1 home win over Șoimii Sibiu, finishing the season in fourth place. After finishing the first half of the following season in 10th place from 12 teams, Vogl was replaced with Gyula Dobo.

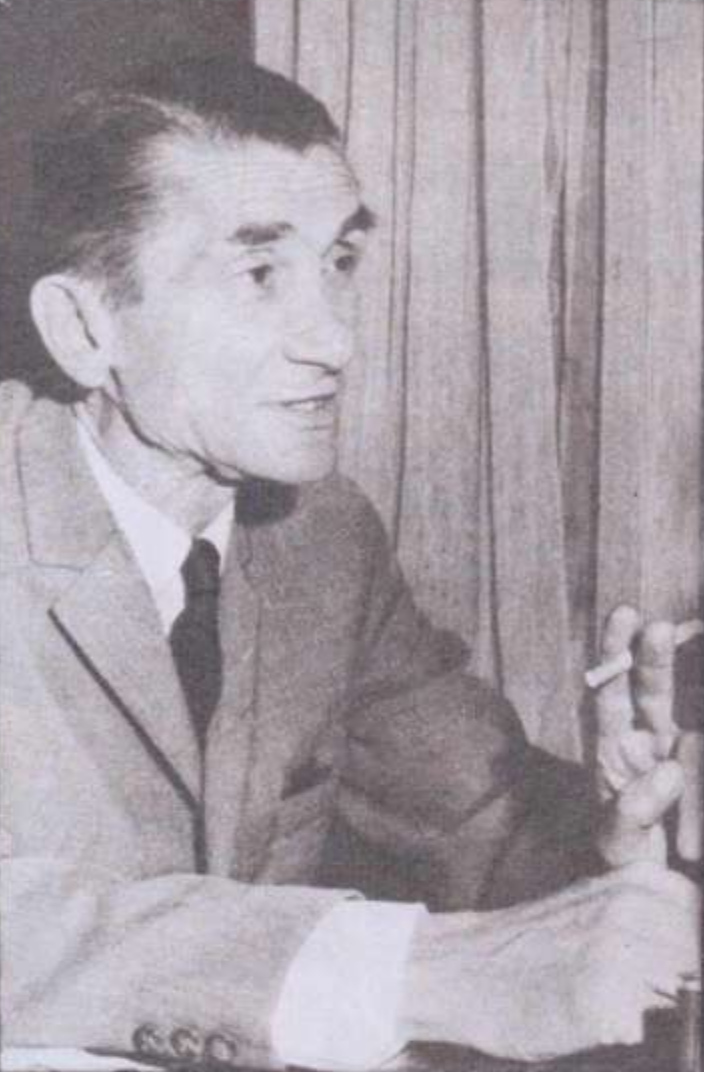
Vogl in 1969

In 1943 he led Juventus once again, this time only as coach, competing due to World War II in an unofficial championship and in the Cupa României. On 13 June 1943, he led Romania's national team for the first time in a 2–2 friendly draw against Slovakia. Vogl returned to Juventus for a final time in the second half of the 1945–46 București championship, replacing Nicolae Petrescu who remained in his staff as an assistant. In the following two seasons he coached the team in Divizia A, finishing the first one in fourth place and the second in fifth. However, in the 1948–49 season after losing in the 19th round with 3–2 a home game to ASA București he was replaced with Colea Vâlcov. In 1949, Vogl had his second experience at Romania's national team, this time leading them together with Coloman Braun-Bogdan in a 1–1 home friendly draw against Albania. From 1950 until 1952, Vogl had his last tenure as Romania's coach, leading them in four friendly games which consisted of a win and two draws against Czechoslovakia, and a win over Albania. Across all of his three spells at the national team he obtained two victories, four draws and no losses.

Between 1963 and 1967, Vogl was a consultant for Rapid București, helping it win its first title in the 1966–67 season. Afterwards he was a consultant for the national team from 1967 until 1971, helping Romania to qualify in 1970 for a FIFA World Cup after 32 years.

== Death ==
Vogl died on 29 October 1971 at the age of 66.

== Honours ==
=== Player ===
Chinezul Timișoara

- Divizia A: 1923–24, 1924–25, 1925–26, 1926–27

Juventus București

- Divizia A: 1929–30

Romania

- Balkan Cup: 1929–31, 1933
- Central European International Cup: 1931–34
