= 1926–27 Divizia A =

15th season of top-tier football league in Romania

Divizia A
- Season: 1926–27
- Champions: Chinezul Timișoara

The 1926–27 Divizia A was the fifteenth season of Divizia A, the top-level football league of Romania.

== Participating teams ==
Region	Team
Arad	AMEF Arad
Bucharest	Unirea Tricolor București
Braşov	Colțea Brașov
Cernăuți	Maccabi Cernăuți
Chişinău	Mihai Viteazul Chișinău
Cluj	Universitatea Cluj
Galaţi	Dacia Vasile Alecsandri Galați
Oradea	Olimpia Satu Mare
Sibiu	Societatea Gimnastică Sibiu
Timișoara	Chinezul Timișoara

== Final Tournament of Regions ==
=== Preliminary Round ===
Team 1	Score	Team 2
Societatea Gimnastică Sibiu (Romania)	2–3	(Romania) Unirea Tricolor București
Mihai Viteazul Chișinău (Romania)	6–0	(Romania) Maccabi Cernăuți

=== Quarters ===
Team 1	Score	Team 2
Colțea Brașov (Romania)	7–1	(Romania) Dacia Vasile Alecsandri Galați
Unirea Tricolor București (Romania)	4–4	(Romania) Mihai Viteazul Chișinău
Unirea Tricolor București (Romania)	3–1	(Romania) Mihai Viteazul Chișinău
Universitatea Cluj (Romania)	3–0	(Romania) AMEF Arad
Chinezul Timișoara (Romania)	6–1	(Romania) Olimpia Satu Mare

=== Semifinals ===
Team 1	Score	Team 2
Colțea Brașov (Romania)	4–1	(Romania) Unirea Tricolor București
Chinezul Timișoara (Romania)	5–2	(Romania) Universitatea Cluj

=== Final ===
7 August 1927

Chinezul Timișoara	2–2	Colțea Brașov
Tänzer ?'; Wetzer ?'		Auer ?', ?'

Gloria CFR, Arad

=== Replay ===
8 August 1927

Chinezul Timișoara	4–3 (a.e.t.)	Colțea Brașov
Wetzer 34', 50'; Tänzer 45'; Teleki 119'		Auer 5', 85'; Csany 20'

Gloria CFR, Arad

== Champion squad ==
Chinezul Timișoara

Goalkeepers: Huszmüller (5 / 0); Markovics (1 / 0); Serghei Bulgakoff (1 / 0); Vilmos Zombori (11 / 0).
Defenders: Adalbert Steiner (15 / 0); Balázs Hoksary (17 / 2); Francisc Agner (2 / 0); Rudolf Bürger (1 / 0).
Midfielders: Bundi (9 / 1); Emerich Vogl (15 / 6); Rudolf Steiner (15 / 1); Ion Zelenak (4 / 0); Vigh (3 / 0).
Forwards: Tänzer II (8 / 3); Ioan Tesler (11 / 13); Rudolf Wetzer (17 / 16); Augustin Semler (16 / 20); Mihai Tänzer (13 / 3); Adalbert Rössler (5 / 0); Marschall (1 / 0); Rudolf Matek (12 / 7); Ognyanov (1 / 1); Eugen Lakatos (4 / 0); Pál Teleki (10 / 12); Coloman Lotter (1 / 1).
(league appearances and goals listed in brackets)

Manager: Frontz Dőme (Hungary) / Jenő Konrád (Hungary) .
