= Ion Șiclovan =

Romanian footballer

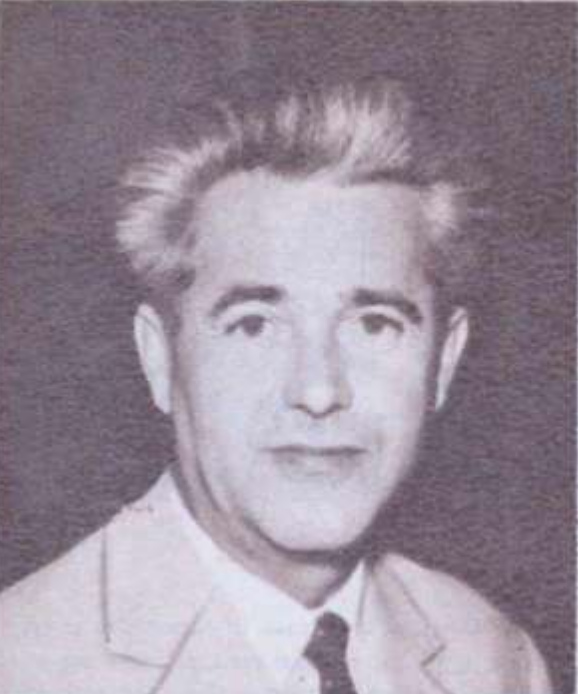

Personal information
- Date of birth: 7 May 1921
- Place of birth: Arad, Romania
- Date of death: 22 May 1985 (aged 64)
- Position: Midfielder

Youth career
- 1932–1937: Gloria Arad

Senior career*
Years	Team	Apps	(Gls)
1937–1941	Gloria Arad (Note: The statistics for the 1939–40 Divizia B season are unavailable.)	37	(4)
1942–1947	Carmen București (Note: The Divizia A 1940–41 was the last season before World War II and the Divizia A 1946–47 was the first one after, so the appearances and goals scored during this period for Carmen București are not official with the exception of the 1945–46 regional championship.)	40	(3)
1947–1948	Ciocanul București	18	(0)
1948–1950	Dinamo București	20	(1)
Total		115	(8)

International career
1941–1947	Romania	4	(0)
- * Club domestic league appearances and goals

Ion Șiclovan (7 May 1921 – 22 May 1985) was a Romanian footballer who played as a midfielder. On 21 November 1948 he played in the first ever CSCA București – Dinamo București derby. After ending his playing career, Șiclovan first worked at FRF, later he was a rector at the National University of Physical Education and Sport from Bucharest and he also became a writer.

== International career ==
Ion Șiclovan played four games at international level for Romania, including a 3–2 victory against Bulgaria at the 1947 Balkan Cup.

== Writing ==
He wrote two volumes, both of them being about sport:

- Teoria antrenamentului sportiv (The sports training theory) (1977)
- Teoria educatiei fizice si sportului (The theory of physical education and sport) (1979)
