= 1938–39 Divizia B =

Divizia B
- Season: 1938–39
- Country: Romania
- Teams: 40 (4x10)
- Promoted: CAM Timișoara; Unirea Tricolor București; Gloria CFR Galați
- Relegated: CFR Brașov; Luceafărul București; Hatmanul Luca Arbore Radăuți; Unirea MV Alba Iulia; SG Sibiu; Mociornița Colțea București; Jahn Cernăuți; Șoimii Sibiu; Tricolor Baia Mare

The 1938–39 Divizia B was the fifth season of the second tier of the Romanian football league system.

The format has been changed, from two series of 12 teams to four regional series of 10 teams. The winners of the series played a promotion play-off and only the first three places promoted to Divizia A.

== Team changes ==
=== To Divizia B ===
Promoted from Divizia C

- IS Câmpia Turzii
- Turda București
- Mociornița Colțea București
- Minerul Lupeni
- Monopol Târgu Mureș
- Traian Tighina
- Mihai Viteazul Chișinău

Relegated from Divizia A

- Unirea Tricolor București
- Universitatea Cluj
- CA Oradea
- Vulturii Textila Lugoj
- Jiul Petroșani
- Crișana Oradea
- CFR Brașov
- Dacia Unirea Brăila
- Olimpia CFR Satu Mare
- Dragoș Vodă Cernăuți

=== From Divizia B ===
Relegated to Divizia C

- —

Promoted to Divizia A

- Tricolor Ploiești
- UD Reșița

=== Renamed teams ===
Victoria Constanța was renamed as AS Constanța.

=== Enrolled teams ===
Victoria CFR Iași and Luceafărul București were enrolled in Divizia B.

=== Disqualified teams ===
Telefon Club București withdrew from Divizia B.

== League tables ==
=== South–East ===
Pos	Team	Pld	W	D	L	GF	GA	GD	Pts	Qualification or relegation
1	Unirea Tricolor București (C, P)	18	13	3	2	52	21	+31	29	Qualification to promotion play-off
2	Maccabi București	18	13	1	4	49	28	+21	27	
3	Prahova Ploiești	18	11	4	3	55	37	+18	26	
4	Constanța	18	11	3	4	57	34	+23	25	
5	Dacia Unirea Brăila	18	7	3	8	36	42	−6	17	
6	Franco-Româna Brăila	18	5	6	7	42	38	+4	16	
7	Turda București	18	4	4	10	36	49	−13	12	
8	CFR Brașov (R)	18	4	3	11	35	51	−16	11	Relegation to Divizia C
9	Luceafărul București (R)	18	3	3	12	25	50	−25	9	Relegation to Divizia C
10	Mociornița Colțea București (R)	18	4	0	14	25	62	−37	8	Relegation to Divizia C

Source: romaniansoccer.ro
Rules for classification: 1) Points 2) Head-to-head points; 3) Head-to-head goal difference; 4) Head-to-head goals scored; 5) Head-to-head away goals scored; 6) Goal difference; 7) Goals scored.
(C) Champions; (P) Promoted; (R) Relegated

=== North–East ===
Pos	Team	Pld	W	D	L	GF	GA	GD	Pts	Qualification or relegation
1	Gloria CFR Galați (C, P)	18	16	1	1	66	16	+50	33	Qualification to promotion play-off
2	Dacia VA Galați	18	13	2	3	54	18	+36	28	
3	Dragoș Vodă Cernăuți	18	10	3	5	58	26	+32	23	
4	Textila Moldova Iași	18	9	2	7	32	19	+13	20	
5	Sporting Chișinău	18	9	2	7	30	31	−1	20	
6	Victoria CFR Iași	18	5	5	8	23	34	−11	15	
7	Mihai Viteazul Chișinău	18	5	3	10	23	61	−38	13	
8	Traian Tighina	18	4	3	11	28	62	−34	11	
9	Hatmanul Luca Arbore Radăuți (R)	18	3	3	12	27	44	−17	9	Relegation to Divizia C
10	Jahn Cernăuți (R)	18	2	2	14	15	51	−36	6	Relegation to Divizia C

Source: romaniansoccer.ro
Rules for classification: 1) Points 2) Head-to-head points; 3) Head-to-head goal difference; 4) Head-to-head goals scored; 5) Head-to-head away goals scored; 6) Goal difference; 7) Goals scored.
(C) Champions; (P) Promoted; (R) Relegated

=== South–West ===
Pos	Team	Pld	W	D	L	GF	GA	GD	Pts	Qualification or relegation
1	CAM Timișoara (C, P)	18	15	0	3	64	16	+48	30	Qualification to promotion play-off
2	CA Oradea	18	12	1	5	51	18	+33	25	
3	Jiul Petroșani	18	11	2	5	41	25	+16	24	
4	Minerul Lupeni	18	9	1	8	37	25	+12	19	
5	Craiovan Craiova	18	9	1	8	35	35	0	19	
6	Vulturii Textila Lugoj	18	9	0	9	37	38	−1	18	
7	CFR Simeria	18	8	2	8	24	25	−1	18	
8	Rovine Grivița Craiova	18	7	1	10	25	43	−18	15	
9	Unirea MV Alba Iulia (R)	18	5	1	12	18	51	−33	11	Relegation to Divizia C
10	Șoimii Sibiu (R)	18	0	1	17	7	63	−56	1	Relegation to Divizia C

Source: romaniansoccer.ro
Rules for classification: 1) Points 2) Head-to-head points; 3) Head-to-head goal difference; 4) Head-to-head goals scored; 5) Head-to-head away goals scored; 6) Goal difference; 7) Goals scored.
(C) Champions; (P) Promoted; (R) Relegated

=== North–West ===
Pos	Team	Pld	W	D	L	GF	GA	GD	Pts	Qualification or relegation
1	Mureșul Târgu Mureș (C)	18	14	1	3	52	19	+33	29	Qualification to promotion play-off
2	IS Câmpia Turzii	18	10	2	6	32	24	+8	22	
3	Universitatea Cluj	18	9	3	6	30	21	+9	21	
4	Crișana Oradea	18	7	5	6	31	18	+13	19	
5	Stăruința Oradea	18	8	2	8	31	32	−1	18	
6	Olimpia CFR Satu Mare	18	7	1	10	16	30	−14	15	
7	Monopol Târgu Mureș	18	6	3	9	28	32	−4	15	
8	Victoria Carei	18	6	3	9	15	34	−19	15	
9	SG Sibiu (R)	18	6	1	11	23	39	−16	13	Relegation to Divizia C
10	Tricolor Baia Mare (R)	18	5	3	10	28	37	−9	13	Relegation to Divizia C

Source: romaniansoccer.ro
Rules for classification: 1) Points 2) Head-to-head points; 3) Head-to-head goal difference; 4) Head-to-head goals scored; 5) Head-to-head away goals scored; 6) Goal difference; 7) Goals scored.
(C) Champions; (R) Relegated

== Promotion play-off ==
Winners of the series played a promotion play-off to decide the first three team which promoted to Divizia A.

=== Round 1 ===
Team 1	Agg.	Team 2	1st leg	2nd leg
CAM Timișoara (SW)	4–2	(NW) Mureșul Târgu Mureș	4–1	0–1
Unirea Tricolor București (SE)	2–2	(NE) Gloria CFR Galați	2–2	0–0

=== Round 2 ===
Team 1	Score	Team 2
Unirea Tricolor București (SE)	2–0	(NE) Gloria CFR Galați

=== Round 3 ===
Team 1	Agg.	Team 2	1st leg	2nd leg
Gloria CFR Galați (NE)	4–3	(NW) Mureșul Târgu Mureș	4–1	0–2

Notes:

- CAM Timișoara, Unirea Tricolor București and Gloria CFR Galați promoted to 1939–40 Divizia A.

== See also ==
- 1938–39 Divizia A
