= 1935 Cupa României final =

- Event: 1934–35 Cupa României
CFR București	Ripensia Timișoara
6	5
- Date: 6 June 1935
- Venue: ONEF, Bucharest
- Referee: Denis Xifando (Bucharest)
- Attendance: 20,000

The 1935 Cupa României final was the second final of Romania's most prestigious football cup competition. It was disputed between Ripensia Timişoara and CFR București, and was won by CFR București after a game with 11 goals in extra time. It was the first cup trophy won by the feroviar team.

== Match details ==
6 June 1935
18:00 EET

CFR București	6–5 (a.e.t.)	Ripensia Timișoara
Junk 34'; Ströck 37'; Georgescu 55', 61', 70'; Barbu 97'	Report	Schwartz 41', 47'; Dobay 66'; Zombory 76'; Ujlaki 88' (o.g.)

ONEF, Bucharest
Attendance: 20,000
Referee: Denis Xifando (Bucharest)

GK	1	(Romania) Francisc Theimler
DF	2	(Romania) Nicolae Roşculeţ
DF	3	(Hungary) Ujlaki
MF	4	(Romania) Vintilă Cossini
MF	5	(Romania) Ştefan Wetzer II
MF	6	(Romania) Alexandru Cuedan
FW	7	(Romania) Gheorghe Georgescu
FW	8	(Romania) Ştefan Barbu
FW	9	(Hungary) Ladislau Ströck
FW	10	(Hungary) Geza Medve
FW	11	(Hungary) Attila Junk
Manager:
(Austria) Carol Wanna

GK	1	(Romania) William Zombory
DF	2	(Romania) Rudolf Bürger
DF	3	(Romania) Balázs Hoksary
MF	4	(Romania) Vasile Deheleanu
MF	5	(Romania) Rudolf Kotormany
MF	6	(Romania) Eugen Lakatos
FW	7	(Romania) Silviu Bindea
FW	8	(Romania) Zoltan Beke
FW	9	(Romania) Gheorghe Ciolac
FW	10	(Romania) Alexandru Schwartz
FW	11	(Romania) Ştefan Dobay
Manager:
(Romania) Rudolf Wetzer

== See also ==
- List of Cupa României finals
