= István Klimek =

Romanian footballer (1913–1988)

Personal information
- Date of birth: 15 April 1913
- Place of birth: Austria-Hungary
- Date of death: 12 November 1988 (aged 75)

Senior career*
Years	Team	Apps	(Gls)
1928–1929	CA Timișoara		
1931–1936	ILSA Timișoara		
1936–1939	Chinezul Timișoara	29	(21)
1940–1941	Rapid Timişoara		

International career
1935	Romania	1	(0)
- * Club domestic league appearances and goals

István Klimek (also written as Stefan Climek; 15 April 1913 – 12 November 1988) was a footballer who played as a striker. Born in Austria-Hungary, he played for the Romania national team.

== Biography ==
While playing for the Romanian club ILSA Timișoara, Klimek was selected to play for the Romania national team by joint coaches Josef Uridil and Costel Rădulescu to play at the 1934 World Cup in Italy. The team were eliminated in the first round by Czechoslovakia, losing 2–1.

== Honours ==
ILSA Timișoara

- Liga II: 1935–36
