= Ioan Tesler =

Romanian footballer

Personal information
- Date of birth: 1903
- Date of death: 1942 (aged 38–39)
- Position: Midfielder

Senior career*
Years	Team	Apps	(Gls)
1924–1929	Chinezul Timișoara (Note: Only the statistics for the 1925–26 and 1926–27 Divizia A seasons are available.)	26	(21)

International career
1925–1928	Romania	6	(0)
- * Club domestic league appearances and goals

Ioan Tesler (1903–1942) was a Romanian footballer who played as a midfielder.

== International career ==
Ioan Tesler played six friendly matches for Romania, making his debut on 31 May 1925 under coach Teofil Morariu in a 4–2 away victory against Bulgaria.

Scores and results table. Romania's goal tally first:

International appearances
App	Date	Venue	Opponent	Result	Competition
1.	31 May 1925	Sofia, Bulgaria	Bulgaria	4–2	Friendly
2.	7 May 1926	Istanbul, Turkey	Turkey	3–1	Friendly
3.	3 October 1926	Zagreb, Yugoslavia	Yugoslavia	3–2	King Alexander's Cup 1926
4.	10 May 1927	Bucharest, Romania	Yugoslavia	0–3	King Alexander's Cup 1927
5.	19 June 1927	Bucharest, Romania	Poland	3–3	Friendly
6.	15 April 1928	Arad, Romania	Turkey	4–2	Friendly

== Honours ==
Chinezul Timișoara

- Divizia A: 1924–25, 1925–26, 1926–27
