= Ion Zelenak =

Romanian footballer

Personal information
- Date of death: 1958
- Position: Midfielder

Senior career*
Years	Team	Apps	(Gls)
1925–1931	Chinezul Timișoara	6	(0)
1931–1932	IAR Brașov		
1932–1936	Chinezul Timișoara	38	(8)
1942–1944	CFR Brașov (Note: The Divizia A 1940–41 was the last season before World War II and the Divizia A 1946–47 was the first one after, so the appearances and goals scored during this period for CFR Brașov are not official.)	0	(0)
Total		44	(8)

International career
1934	Romania	1	(0)
- * Club domestic league appearances and goals

Ion Zelenak (died 1958) was a Romanian footballer who played as a midfielder.

== International career ==
Ion Zelenak played one friendly match for Romania, on 14 October 1934 under coach Alexandru Săvulescu in a 3–3 against Poland.

== Honours ==
Chinezul Timișoara

- Divizia A: 1925–26, 1926–27
