= Ceacheí =

Chilean nationalist and sports battle cry

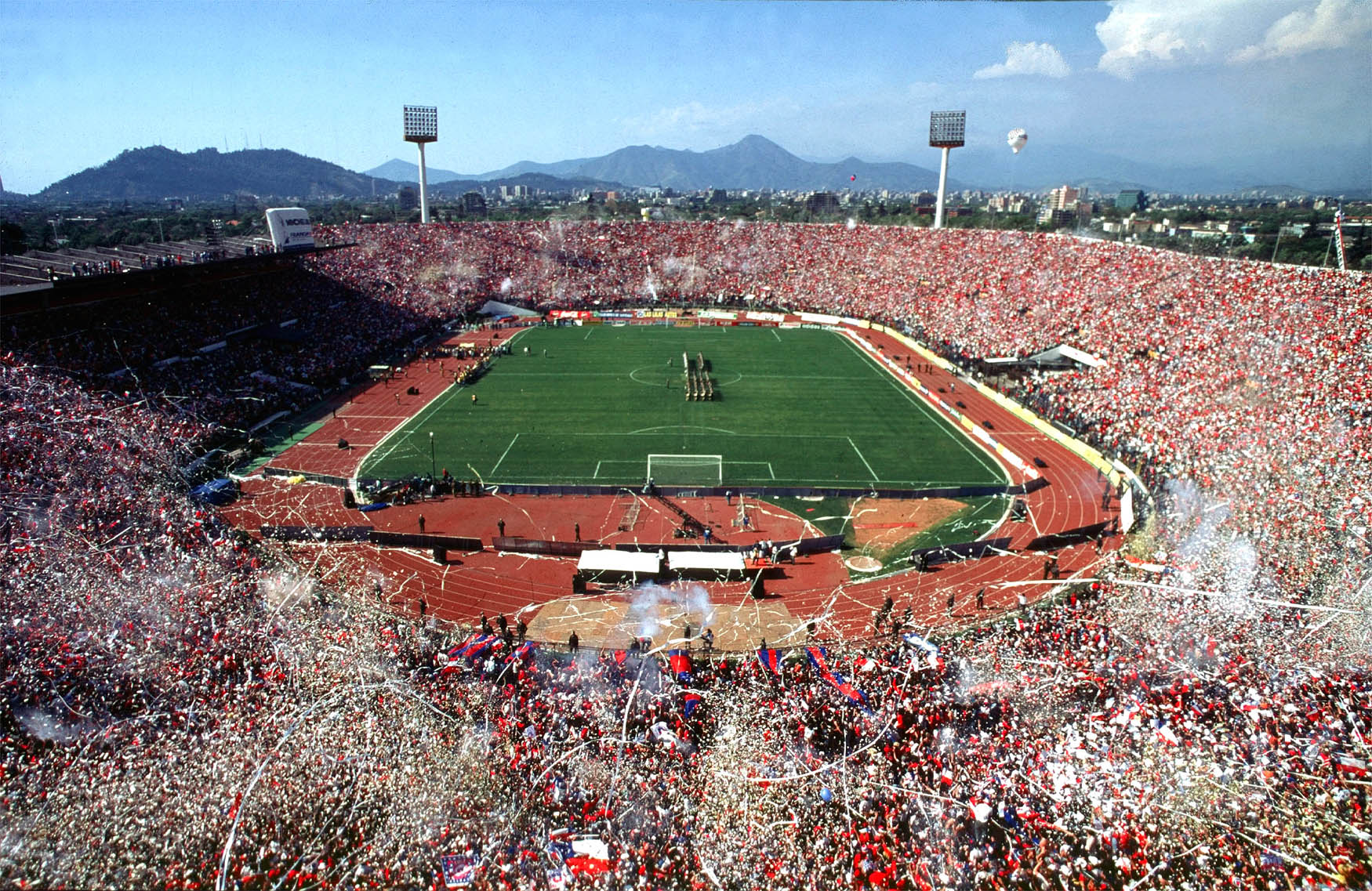
Fans of the Chilean national football team at the National Stadium of Chile.

A ceacheí, also known as cehacheí, is a battle cry that is commonly used during sports events to cheer on a Chilean representative. This Chilean expression is derived from spelling out the first letters of the name "Chile." It is typically performed by two voices that come together for the final part, as follows:

- Voice 1: Ce, hache, i...
- Voice 2: ¡Chi!
- Voice 1: Ele, e...
- Voice 2: ¡Le!
- Both voices together: ¡Chi, chi, chi, le, le, le..., viva Chile! ("Long live Chile!")

Occasionally, voice 1 starts with the phrase: ¡Atención chilenos de corazón! ("Attention Chileans at heart!"). Although the chant originated in sports contexts, it has become deeply ingrained in the national culture and is now used on various occasions, such as celebrations or demonstrations.

== History ==
The first records of ceacheís date back to the second half of the 1920s. During the 5th South American Athletics Championship held at the Campos de Sports de Ñuñoa in the city of Santiago in 1927, the leader of the Chilean cheerleading squad, Osvaldo "Paco" Vera, guided the chant to cheer on the Chilean athletes who were competing closely with the Argentine delegation (Uruguay also participated) for first place. In his book Las memorias de Míster Huifa (1986), sports journalist Renato González narrated that he had heard it for the first time during the participation of Chilean decathletes Erwin Gevert (winner), Serapio Cabello (second), and Carlos Jahnke (third) against the Argentine Valerio Vallanía. This event ultimately secured victory for Chile, which gave importance and popularity to the ceacheí. According to the account of reporter Carlos Zeda in the magazine Los Sports, it was first used on April 17 as a rallying cry for long-distance runner Manuel Plaza on his last day of participation, which he won. Some sources cite pole vaulter Humberto Guiraldes, leader of the local fans during that tournament, as the creator and promoter.

It was institutionalized in 1933 by architecture students from the University of Chile during a fiesta bufa (a kind of study trip). While traveling on the ship Reina del Pacífico to the city of Antofagasta, Julio Cordero sketched the first lines of the club's anthem, called Romántico viajero, which they finished with the ceacheí. It remained as a symbol of the university until 1960 when the final phrase of the chorus, ¡Chi, chi, chi, le, le, le..., Universidad de Chile! was transformed into ¡viva Chile! by trumpeter Jorge Yuraidini, the director of the hosting crowd at the 8th South American Women's Basketball Championship held in Santiago, which Chile won. Similarly, most other sports clubs in the country adopted it, modifying the final part. In the song El rock del Mundial ("The World Cup Rock") by the local band Los Ramblers, which was the official song of the 7th FIFA World Cup held in Chile in 1962, you can hear in the chorus, Gol, gol de Chile... un sonoro ceacheí y bailemos rock and roll ("Goal, goal for Chile... a loud ceacheí and let's dance rock and roll").

In 2010, the Diccionario de uso del español de Chile ("Dictionary of the Use of Spanish in Chile") was published by the Chilean Academy of Language, and it included ceacheí as a Chilean term. According to the authors, ceacheí was likely the most Chilean word included in their work. Over the years, the chant has become a universal symbol and used on various occasions, such as during the rescue of the 33 miners from the San José mine in 2010. The miners chanted it when they first made contact with the surface and continued to use it on multiple occasions after they were freed from their confinement.
