= Samuel Zauber =

Romanian footballer

Personal information
- Date of birth: 9 January 1901
- Place of birth: Timișoara, Austria-Hungary
- Date of death: 10 June 1986 (aged 85)
- Position: Goalkeeper

Senior career*
Years	Team	Apps	(Gls)
1924–1925	Maccabi București	13	(0)
1925–1926	Sportul București	11	(0)
1928–1936	Maccabi București	146	(0)
Total		170	(0)

International career
1931	Romania	3	(0)
- * Club domestic league appearances and goals

Samuel Zauber (9 January 1901 Temesvár – 10 June 1986 Jerusalem) was a Romanian association football player who was on the Romania national football team for the first ever FIFA World Cup in 1930. Since 1964 he lived in Jerusalem, in Israel.

== Playing career ==
=== Club ===
Zauber played his club football for Jewish side, Maccabi București.

=== International ===
Zauber was the back up goalkeeper for Romania at the 1930 FIFA World Cup in Uruguay. Afterwards, he represented Romania in the Balkan Cup.

== Honours ==
=== Club ===
Maccabi București

- Liga II (1): 1934–35

=== International ===
Romania

- Balkan Cup (1): 1929–31

== Sources ==
- 28 May 1992 כ"ה אייר תשנ"ב Reshumot Yalkut hapirsumim nr.4008 death date in Israel official monitor
