= 1936–37 Cupa României =

Tournament details
- Country: Romania
- Teams: 166

Final positions
- Champions: Rapid București (2nd title)
- Runners-up: Ripensia Timișoara

Tournament statistics
- Matches played: 31
- Goals scored: 118 (3.81 per match)

The 1936–37 Cupa României was the fourth edition of Romania's most prestigious football cup competition.

The title was won by Rapid București after a final against Ripensia Timișoara. It was the second cup for Rapid, and the first of six consecutive successes.

== Format ==
The competition is an annual knockout tournament with pairings for each round drawn at random.

There are no seeds for the draw. The draw also determines which teams will play at home. Each tie is played as a single leg.

If a match is drawn after 90 minutes, the game goes in extra time, and if the scored is still tight after 120 minutes, there a replay will be played, usually at the ground of the team who were away for the first game.

From the first edition, the teams from Divizia A entered in competition in sixteen finals, rule which remained till today.

The format is quite similar to the oldest recognised football tournament in the world, the FA Cup.

== Bracket ==
Round of 32
Craiu Iovan Craiova	0
Victoria Cluj	2
Crișana Oradea	2
AMEF Arad	1
Rapid București	3
CA Oradea	1
Jahn Cernăuți	2
Textila Moldova Iași	1
Sporting Chișinău	1
IS Câmpia Turzii	0
Venus București	2
Chinezul Timișoara	1
Societatea Gimnastică Sibiu	0
Gloria Arad	2
Stăruința Oradea	0
Jiul Petroșani	2
AS CFR Brașov	1
Unirea Tricolor București	3
Ripensia Timișoara (a.e.t.)	2
Olimpia CFR Satu Mare	1
Tricolor CF Ploiești	1
Universitatea Cluj	2
Victoria Constanța	3
Maccabi București	0
Franco-Româna Brăila	3
CAM Timișoara (a.e.t.)	4
Phoenix Baia Mare	1
Juventus București (a.e.t.)	2
Sportul Studențesc București	4
Telefon Club București	1
Vulturii Textila Lugoj	4
Mureşul Târgu Mureş	0

Round of 16
Victoria Cluj (a.e.t.)	3
Crișana Oradea	2
Rapid București	7
Jahn Cernăuți	3
Sporting Chișinău	1
Venus București	3
Gloria Arad	1
Jiul Petroșani	2
Unirea Tricolor București	0
Ripensia Timișoara	1
Universitatea Cluj (a.e.t.)	4
Victoria Constanța	1
CAM Timișoara	0
Juventus București	1
Sportul Studențesc București	1
Vulturii Textila Lugoj	2

Quarter-finals
Victoria Cluj	2
Rapid București	3
Venus București (a.e.t.)	4
Jiul Petroșani	1
Ripensia Timișoara	1
Universitatea Cluj	0
Juventus București	4
Vulturii Textila Lugoj	0

Semi-finals
Rapid București	5
Venus București	1
Ripensia Timișoara	5
Juventus București	2

Final
Rapid București	5
Ripensia Timișoara	1

== First round proper ==
Team 1	Score	Team 2
20 March 1937
Sportul Studențesc București (Div. B)	4–1	(Div. C) Telefon Club București
21 March 1937
Vulturii Textila Lugoj (Div. B)	4–0	(Div. B) Mureşul Târgu Mureş
Victoria Constanța (Div. B)	3–0	(Div. B) Maccabi București
Societatea Gimnastică Sibiu (Div. C)	0–2	(Div. A) Gloria Arad
Stăruința Oradea (Div. B)	0–2	(Div. B) Jiul Petroșani
Craiu Iovan Craiova (Div. B)	0–2	(Div. A) Victoria Cluj
Sporting Chișinău (Div. B)	1–0	(Div. C) IS Câmpia Turzii
Rapid București (Div. A)	3–1	(Div. A) CA Oradea
AS CFR Brașov (Div. B)	1–3	(Div. A) Unirea Tricolor București
Phoenix Baia Mare (Div. B)	1–2 (a.e.t.)	(Div. A) Juventus București
Ripensia Timișoara (Div. A)	2–1 (a.e.t.)	(Div. B) Olimpia CFR Satu Mare
Venus București (Div. A)	2–1	(Div. A) Chinezul Timișoara
Tricolor CF Ploiești (Div. B)	1–2	(Div. A) Universitatea Cluj
Crișana Oradea (Div. A)	2–1	(Div. A) AMEF Arad
Jahn Cernăuți (Div. B)	2–1	(Div. B) Textila Moldova Iași
Franco-Româna Brăila (Div. B)	3–4 (a.e.t.)	(Div. B) CAM Timișoara

== Second round proper ==
Team 1	Score	Team 2
25 April 1937
Sportul Studențesc București	1–2	Vulturii Textila Lugoj
Gloria Arad	1–2	Jiul Petroșani
Victoria Cluj	3–2 (a.e.t.)	Crișana Oradea
Rapid București	7–3	Jahn Cernăuți
CAM Timișoara	0–1	Juventus București
Unirea Tricolor București	0–1	Ripensia Timișoara
Sporting Chișinău	1–3	Venus București
Universitatea Cluj	4–1 (a.e.t.)	Victoria Constanța

== Quarter-finals ==
Team 1	Score	Team 2
9 May 1937
Victoria Cluj	2–3	Rapid București
Juventus București	4–0	Vulturii Textila Lugoj
Ripensia Timișoara	1–0	Universitatea Cluj
Venus București	4–1 (a.e.t.)	Jiul Petroșani

== Semi-finals ==
Team 1	Score	Team 2
30 May 1937
Rapid București	5–1	Venus București
Ripensia Timișoara	5–2	Juventus București

== Final ==
20 June 1937
17:45 EET

Rapid București	5–1	Ripensia Timișoara
Auer 4'; Moldoveanu 69', 75'; Baratky 72', 86'	Report	Dobay 40'

ONEF, Bucharest
Attendance: 15,000
Referee: Denis Xifando (Bucharest)

Cupa României 1936–37 winners

2nd title
