= Adalbert Steiner =

Romanian footballer (1907–1984)

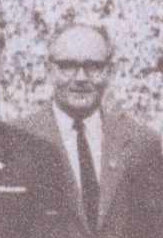
- Steiner in 1966

Personal information
- Date of birth: 24 January 1907
- Place of birth: Temesvár, Austria-Hungary
- Date of death: 10 December 1984 (aged 77)
- Position: Defender

Youth career
- 1920–1921: AVTK Timișoara
- 1921–1922: Unirea Timișoara
- 1922–1924: Chinezul Timișoara

Senior career*
Years	Team	Apps	(Gls)
1924–1930	Chinezul Timișoara (Note: Only the statistics for the 1925–26 and 1926–27 Divizia A seasons are available.)	32	(0)
1930	CA Timișoara		

International career
1926–1930	Romania	10	(0)
- * Club domestic league appearances and goals

Adalbert Steiner II (24 January 1907 – 10 December 1984) was a Romanian football defender.

== Club career ==
Steiner was born on 24 January 1907 in Temesvár, Austria-Hungary (now Romania). He began playing junior-level football at age 13 for local club AVTK. In 1921 he moved to newly-founded club Unirea. One year later he went to play for Chinezul Timișoara.

In 1924 at age 17, Steiner started to play for the senior squad of Chinezul, winning three consecutive titles in his first three seasons. In the first two title wins, he worked with coach Frontz Dőme who used him in 17 matches in the second season. For the third title he played 15 games under coaches Dőme and Jenő Konrád, also being teammates with his brother, Rudolf. His last club career spell took place in 1930 at CA Timișoara.

== International career ==
Steiner played ten games for Romania. He and his brother Rudolf made their debut together on 7 May 1926 under coach Teofil Morariu in a friendly that ended with a 3–1 away victory against Turkey. He played in two victories against Yugoslavia and Greece in the 1929–31 Balkan Cup, a tournament that was won by Romania.

Steiner was selected by coach Constantin Rădulescu to be part of Romania's squad for the 1930 World Cup. There, he played in the first group stage game, a 3–1 victory against Peru in which he was injured by opponent Luis de Souza – an injury from which he never recovered, ending his career at age 23. Steiner did not feature in the second game, a 4–0 loss to hosts and eventual world champions Uruguay.

== Personal life ==
Steiner's father, Karl Steiner, was a Bohemian-born engineer who settled in Temesvár, where he married and had eight children. One of Steiner's brothers, Rudolf, was also a footballer, and they played together for Chinezul Timișoara and Romania's national team. In 1941, Steiner married a woman named Aurora Subolotzky, with whom he had two sons, Iosif and Adalbert.

== Death ==
Steiner died on 10 December 1987 at age 87 in his native Timișoara.

== Honours ==
Chinezul Timișoara

- Divizia A: 1924–25, 1925–26, 1926–27

Romania

- Balkan Cup: 1929–31
