= Rudolf Matek =

Romanian footballer

Personal information
- Date of birth: 24 June 1898
- Date of death: Unknown
- Position: Striker

Senior career*
Years	Team	Apps	(Gls)
1921–1929	Chinezul Timișoara (Note: Only the statistics for the 1925–26 and 1926–27 Divizia A seasons are available.)	29	(15)

International career
1923–1926	Romania	3	(1)
- * Club domestic league appearances and goals

Rudolf Matek (born 24 June 1898, date of death unknown) was a Romanian footballer who played as a striker.

== International career ==
Rudolf Matek played three friendly matches for Romania, scoring one goal in his last game played, a 3–1 victory against Turkey.

Scores and results table. Romania's goal tally first:

International appearances
App	Date	Venue	Opponent	Result	Competition
1.	2 September 1923	Lviv, Poland	Poland	1–1	Friendly
2.	31 May 1925	Sofia, Bulgaria	Bulgaria	4–2	Friendly
3.	7 May 1926	Istanbul, Turkey	Turkey	3–1	Friendly

== Honours ==
Chinezul Timișoara

- Divizia A: 1921–22, 1922–23, 1923–24, 1924–25, 1925–26, 1926–27
