= Ștefan Barbu =

Romanian footballer

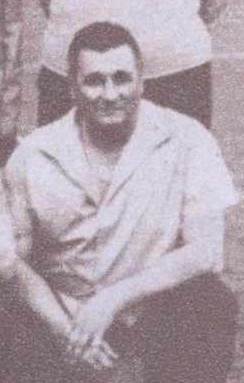

Personal information
- Date of birth: 2 March 1908
- Place of birth: Arad, Austria-Hungary
- Date of death: 30 June 1970 (aged 62)
- Place of death: Arad, Romania
- Position: Striker

Youth career
- 1921: Olimpia Arad
- 1921–1927: Gloria Arad

Senior career*
Years	Team	Apps	(Gls)
1927–1929	Gloria Arad		
1930–1932	Olimpia Arad		
1932–1933	Gloria Arad	7	(5)
1933–1938	Rapid București	68	(42)
1938	Olimpia Arad		
1939	Gloria Arad	2	(0)
1940–1941	Crișana Arad		
Total		77	(47)

International career
1927–1930	Romania	7	(0)

Managerial career
- Gloria Arad
- CA Pecica
- * Club domestic league appearances and goals

Ștefan Barbu (2 March 1908 in Arad, Austria-Hungary (now Romania) – 30 June 1970 in Arad) was a Romanian football striker, who played in the 1930 FIFA World Cup in Uruguay.

== Club career ==
Barbu was born on 2 March 1908 in Arad, Austria-Hungary (now Romania). He started playing junior level football in 1921 at local club Olimpia, moving afterwards to neighboring club Gloria. He started his senior career in 1927 at Gloria, moving a few years later back to Olimpia. In 1932, he made a comeback to Gloria where on 11 September he made his Divizia A debut in a 2–1 away victory against România Cluj.

In 1933, Barbu joined Rapid București where he won the first trophy of his career, the 1934–35 Cupa României, managing to score the victory goal in the 6–5 win in extra time against Ripensia Timișoara in the final. In the following season he became the top-scorer of the league, netting 23 goals in 20 games. In the next two seasons he would win two more Cupa României with The Railwaymen but played in only one of the finals, the 5–1 win over Ripensia in 1937.

In 1938, Barbu returned to Arad, first at Olimpia, then he went to Gloria where on 16 April 1939 he made his last Divizia A appearance in a 3–1 away loss to Unirea Tricolor București, totaling 77 matches with 47 goals in the competition. Barbu ended his career after playing for Crișana Arad in the 1940–41 Divizia B season.

== International career ==
Barbu played seven games for Romania, making his debut at age 19 on 19 June 1927 under coach Teofil Morariu in a 3–3 friendly draw against Poland. He was selected by coach Constantin Rădulescu to be part of the team's 1930 World Cup squad in which he played in both of Romania's games in the tournament, the 3–1 victory against Peru and the 4–0 loss to eventual tournament winners Uruguay. Barbu's last appearance for The Tricolours took place on 12 October 1930 in a 5–3 away loss to Bulgaria during the successful 1929–31 Balkan Cup, where he had previously played in an 8–1 win over Greece.

== After retirement ==
After he ended his playing career, Barbu worked for a while as coach at Gloria Arad and CA Pecica. Afterwards he was a referee for 15 years, officiating including in Romania's top-league, Divizia A. In his later life he was the president of CFR Arad.

== Death ==
Barbu died on 30 June 1972 at age 62.

== Honours ==
=== Club ===
Rapid București

- Cupa României: 1934–35, 1936–37, 1937–38

=== International ===
Romania

- Balkan Cup: 1929–31

=== Individual ===
- Divizia A top-scorer: 1935–36
