= Rudolf Steiner (footballer, born 1903) =

Romanian footballer

Personal information
- Date of birth: 20 October 1903
- Place of birth: Temesvár, Austria-Hungary
- Date of death: 24 January 1994 (aged 90)
- Position: Midfielder

Senior career*
Years	Team	Apps	(Gls)
1926–1932	Chinezul Timișoara (Note: Only the statistics for the Divizia A 1926–27 season are available.)	15	(1)

International career
1926–1928	Romania	5	(0)
- * Club domestic league appearances and goals

Rudolf Steiner I (20 October 1903 – 24 January 1994) was a Romanian football midfielder.

== Club career ==
Steiner was born on 20 October 1903 in Temesvár, Austria-Hungary (now Romania). In 1926 he went to play for Chinezul Timișoara. He won the title at the end of his first season, playing 15 games and scoring once under coaches Frontz Dőme and Jenő Konrád, also being teammates with his brother, Adalbert. His spell at Chinezul ended in 1932.

== International career ==
Steiner played five games for Romania. He and his brother Adalbert made their debut together on 7 May 1926 under coach Teofil Morariu in a friendly that ended with a 3–1 away victory against Turkey. His following two games were a victory and a loss against Yugoslavia in the friendly King Alexander's Cup. His last two appearances for the national team were a 4–2 home win over Turkey in a friendly and a 3–1 away loss to Yugoslavia during another King Alexander's Cup.

Steiner was selected by coach Constantin Rădulescu for Romania's squad for the 1930 World Cup, but he did not play.

== Personal life ==
Steiner's father, Karl Steiner, was a Bohemian-born engineer who settled in Temesvár, where he married and had eight children. One of Steiner's brothers, Adalbert, was also a footballer, and they played together for Chinezul Timișoara and Romania's national team.

== Death ==
Steiner died on 24 January 1994 at age 90.

== Honours ==
Chinezul Timișoara

- Divizia A: 1926–27
