= Adalbert Hrehuss =

Romanian footballer

Personal information
- Date of birth: 1906
- Position: Midfielder

Senior career*
Years	Team	Apps	(Gls)
1924–1926	CA Timișoara		
1926–1928	Colțea Brașov		
1928–1931	CA Timișoara		
1931–1935	Ripensia Timișoara	21	(0)
1935–1939	Maccabi București		

International career
1930–1932	Romania	2	(0)
- * Club domestic league appearances and goals

Adalbert Hrehuss (born 1906, date of death unknown) was a Romanian footballer who played as a midfielder.

== International career ==
Adalbert Hrehuss played two matches for Romania, making his debut on 12 October 1930 under coach Constantin Rădulescu in a 5–3 loss against Bulgaria at the 1929–31 Balkan Cup. His second game was a friendly which ended with a 6–3 victory against France.

== Honours ==
Colțea Brașov

- Divizia A: 1927–28

Ripensia Timișoara

- Divizia A: 1932–33, 1934–35
- Cupa României: 1933–34
