= 1925–26 Divizia A =

14th season of top-tier football league in Romania

Divizia A
- Season: 1925–26
- Champions: Chinezul Timișoara

The 1925–26 Divizia A was the fourteenth season of Divizia A, the top-level football league of Romania.

== Participating teams ==
Region	Team
Arad	AMEF Arad
Bucharest	Juventus București
Brașov	Colțea Brașov
Cernăuți	Hakoah Cernăuți
Chișinău	Fulgerul Chișinău
Cluj	Victoria Cluj
Craiova	Craiu Iovan Craiova
Oradea	Stăruința Oradea
Satu Mare	FC Olimpia Satu Mare
Sibiu	Societatea Gimnastică Sibiu
Timișoara	Chinezul Timișoara

== Final Tournament of Regions ==
=== Preliminary Games ===
Team 1	Score	Team 2
Juventus București (Romania)	4–1	(Romania) Craiu Iovan Craiova
AMEF Arad (Romania)	3–1	(Romania) Victoria Cluj
Stăruința Oradea (Romania)	4–3	(Romania) FC Olimpia Satu Mare

=== Quarters ===
Team 1	Score	Team 2
Societatea Gimnastică Sibiu (Romania)	1–3	(Romania) Juventus București
AMEF Arad (Romania)	3–0	(Romania) Colțea Brașov
Stăruința Oradea (Romania)	0–5	(Romania) Chinezul Timișoara
Hakoah Cernăuți (Romania)	0–1	(Romania) Fulgerul Chișinău

=== Semifinals ===
Team 1	Score	Team 2
AMEF Arad (Romania)	2–5	(Romania) Chinezul Timișoara
Juventus București (Romania)	2–2	(Romania) Fulgerul Chișinău
Juventus București (Romania)	4–1	(Romania) Fulgerul Chișinău

=== Final ===
1 August 1926

Chinezul Timișoara	3–0	Juventus București
Tänzer 35' (pen.); Semler 70', 74'

Stadionul "Banatul", Timișoara
Attendance: 3,000
Referee: Teofil Morariu

== Champion squad ==
Chinezul Timișoara

Goalkeepers: Futo (2 / 0); Huszmüller (5 / 0), Adalbert Ritter (10 / 0).
Defenders: Balázs Hoksary (6 / 0); Adalbert Steiner (17 / 0); Jozsef Korom (10 / 0).
Midfielders: Fenyvessi (5 / 0); Emerich Vogl (16 / 15); Eugen Lakatos (15 / 0); Ognyanov (1 / 0); Jozsef Patay II (1 / 0); Adalbert Rössler (13 / 0); Jozsef Bundy (3 / 0).
Forwards: Beres (1 / 0); Coloman Lotter (2 / 0); Mihai Tänzer (17 / 13); Bruno Steiner (1 / 3); Augustin Semler (17 / 41); Rudolf Matek (17 / 8); Marschall (1 / 0); Ioan Tesler (15 / 8); Ion Zelenak (2 / 0); Rudolf Wetzer (10 / 10).
(league appearances and goals listed in brackets)

Manager: Frontz Dőme (Hungary) .
