= Metalul Reșița =

Metalul Reșița can refer to:

- CS Muncitorul Reșița, shortened CS Muncitorul Reșița, a Romanian football club founded in 1911
- CSM Reșița, named Metalul Reșița during 1949–1956, a Romanian football club founded in 1926
- Sportul Snagov, named Metalul Reșița during 2013–2017, a Romanian football club founded in 2010
