= Horacio Muñoz =

Chilean footballer (1896-1976)

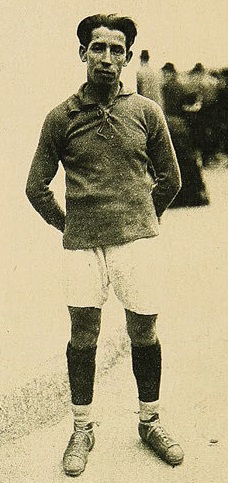
- Muñoz in Los Sports, 1926

Personal information
- Full name: Horacio Muñoz Muñoz
- Date of birth: 18 May 1896
- Place of birth: Chile
- Date of death: 23 October 1976 (aged 80)
- Position: Defender

Senior career*
Years	Team	Apps	(Gls)
?	C.D. Arturo Fernández Vial		

International career
1917–1920	Chile	7	(0)
- * Club domestic league appearances and goals

Horacio Muñoz Muñoz (18 May 1896 – 23 October 1976) was a Chilean football defender. He played in the 1917 South American Championship, as well as the 1919 and 1920 editions of the same tournament. He was in the Chile squad for the 1930 FIFA World Cup but he failed to make an appearance in the tournament.
