= Gheorghe Georgescu =

Romanian footballer

Personal information
- Date of birth: 15 July 1911
- Place of birth: Romania
- Position: Forward

Senior career*
Years	Team	Apps	(Gls)
1933–1934	Turda București	16	(6)
1934–1937	Rapid București	40	(8)
1937–1938	CFR Brașov	15	(4)
1938–1940	Rapid București	3	(0)
Total		74	(18)

International career
1935	Romania	3	(1)
- * Club domestic league appearances and goals

Gheorghe Georgescu (born 15 July 1911; date of death unknown) was a Romanian footballer who played as a forward. He scored a hat-trick in the 6–5 victory against Ripensia Timișoara in the 1934–35 Cupa României final, which helped Rapid București win the first trophy in the club's history.

== International career ==
Gheorghe Georgescu played three games at international level for Romania, including two games at the 1935 Balkan Cup. He scored one goal in a friendly which ended with a 7–1 loss against Sweden.

== Honours ==
Rapid București

- Cupa României: 1934–35, 1936–37, 1938–39
