= 1924–25 Divizia A =

13th season of top-tier football league in Romania

Divizia A
- Season: 1924–25
- Champions: Chinezul Timișoara

The 1924–25 Divizia A was the thirteenth season of Divizia A, the top-level football league of Romania.

== Participating teams ==
Region	Team
Arad	UCAS Petroșani
Bucharest	Venus București
Brașov	Brașovia Brașov
Cernăuți	Jahn Cernăuți
Chișinău	Fulgerul Chișinău
Cluj	Universitatea Cluj
Craiova	Oltul Slatina
Oradea	Clubul Atletic Oradea
Sibiu	Șoimii Sibiu
Timișoara	Chinezul Timișoara

== Final Tournament of Regions ==
=== Preliminary round ===
Team 1	Score	Team 2
Oltul Slatina (Romania)	0–2	(Romania) Fulgerul Chișinău
Jahn Cernăuți (Romania)	3–0^{1}	(Romania) Șoimii Sibiu

^{1} The team from Sibiu failed to appear, so it lost the game with 0–3, by administrative decision.

=== Quarters ===
Team 1	Score	Team 2
Jahn Cernăuți (Romania)	1–2^{1}	(Romania) Fulgerul Chișinău
Jahn Cernăuți (Romania)	4–0	(Romania) Oltul Slatina
Brașovia Brașov (Romania)	2–1	(Romania) Clubul Atletic Oradea
Chinezul Timișoara (Romania)	3–0	(Romania) Venus București
UCAS Petroșani (Romania)	^{2}	(Romania) Universitatea Cluj
Universitatea Cluj (Romania)	0–1	(Romania) UCAS Petroșani

^{1} Fulgerul was disqualified, the result being annulled.

^{2} Interrupted.

=== Semifinals ===
Team 1	Score	Team 2
Chinezul Timișoara (Romania)	3–0	(Romania) Brașovia Brașov
UCAS Petroșani (Romania)	3–1	(Romania) Jahn Cernăuți

=== Final ===
9 August 1925

Chinezul Timișoara	5–1	UCAS Petroșani
Vogl (?); Tessler (?); Semler (?); Matek (?)		Veszpremy (?)

Stadionul "Gloria CFR", Arad
Attendance: 6,000

== Champion squad ==
Chinezul Timișoara

Goalkeepers: Adalbert Ritter.
Defenders: Adalbert Steiner, Adalbert Rössler.
Midfielders: Bundi, Emerich Vogl, Hütter.
Forwards: Mihai Tänzer, Tessler, Frech I, Augustin Semler, Rudolf Matek.
(the players that played the final)

Manager: Frontz Dőme (Hungary) .
