= Fulgerul CFR Chișinău =

- Full name: Fulgerul CFR Chișinău
- Short name: Fulgerul
- Founded: during 1920
- Dissolved: 1940
- Ground: Fulgerul Chișinău Stadium
- Capacity: 2 000

Fulgerul CFR Chișinău was a football club from Chișinău, Kingdom of Romania, Fulgerul (The Lightning) was the first champion of Bessarabia region and along with rival Mihai Viteazul Chișinău was one of the strongest teams in Bessarabia.

== History ==
The club was founded in the early 1920s with the name "CFR Chisinau Regiment" and was the first team from Bessarabia to participate in the final tournament of the Divizia A, achieving this in the 1924–25. In that season, the team won the regional championship and qualified for the final phase of the Romanian championship where it met the team Oltul Slatina, defeating it 2–0. In the quarterfinals, Fulgerul played with the team Jahn Cernăuți, which they defeated 2–1. At the same time, Oltul Slatina challenged the result of the match with Fulgerul, claiming that Fulgerul CFR Chișinău had players from other teams in the team, consequently Fulgerul CFR was disqualified, and the results were annulled.

=== 1924–25 Divizia A ===
Preliminary round

Team 1	Score	Team 2
Oltul Slatina (Romania)	0–2	(Romania) Fulgerul Chişinău

Quarters

Team 1	Score	Team 2
Jahn Cernăuți (Romania)	1–2^{1}	(Romania) Fulgerul Chişinău

^{1} Fulgerul was disqualified, the result being annulled.

In 1925 the "CFR Chișinău Regiment" team was renamed the Fulgerul CFR Chișinău. In the next season (1925–26 Divizia A) the team won the Bessarabia championship again. In the quarterfinals of the Romanian championship, they met Hakoah Chernivtsi, defeating them with the score of 1–0. In the semifinals, Fulgerul dueled with Juventus Bucharest, in the first match there was a tie, 2–2, and in the replay Chișinău lost 4–1.

Among the most important players who played for Fulgerul CFR Chișinău are Iozsef Kilianovits and Albert Ströck, both of whom also played for the Romania national football team.

== Honours ==
- Regional East League
  - Winners (2): 1924–25, 1925–26
