= Augustin Semler =

Romanian footballer (1904–1947)

Personal information
- Date of birth: 1904
- Date of death: 1947 (aged 42–43)
- Position: Forward

Senior career*
Years	Team	Apps	(Gls)
1923–1927	Chinezul Timișoara	33	(61)
1929–1930	Bocskai Debrecen	9	(3)
1930–1932	Ripensia Timișoara		
1932–1933	Montpellier		
1933–1934	Chinezul Timișoara	13	(7)
Total		55	(71)

International career
1924–1927	Romania	5	(6)
- * Club domestic league appearances and goals

Augustin Semler, also known as Gustav Semler or Szemes Gusztáv (1904 – 1947), was a Romanian footballer who played as a forward. He had two spells at defunct club Chinezul Timișoara, and also played for French side Montpellier. He made five appearances for the Romania national team and was also part of Romania's squad for the football tournament at the 1924 Summer Olympics, but he did not play in his country's only match at that tournament.

== Career statistics ==
=== Club ===
Appearances and goals by club, season and competition
Club	Season	League			Cup		Continental		Other		Total	
Club	Season	Division	Apps	Goals	Apps	Goals	Apps	Goals	Apps	Goals	Apps	Goals
Chinezul Timișoara	1925–26	Divizia A	17	41	0	0	–		0	0	17	41
Chinezul Timișoara	1926–27	Divizia A	16	20	0	0	–		0	0	16	20
Chinezul Timișoara	Total		33	61	0	0	0	0	0	0	33	61
Bocskai Debrecen	1929–30	Nemzeti Bajnokság I	9	3	0	0	–		0	0	9	3
Chinezul Timișoara	1933–34	Divizia A	13	7	0	0	–		0	0	13	7
Career total			55	71	0	0	0	0	0	0	55	71

=== International ===
Appearances and goals by national team and year
National team	Year	Apps	Goals
Romania	1924	1	1
Romania	1925	1	2
Romania	1926	2	3
Romania	1927	1	0
Total		5	6

Scores and results list Romania's goal tally first, score column indicates score after each Semler goal.

List of international goals scored by Augustin Semler
No.	Date	Venue	Opponent	Score	Result	Competition
1	31 August 1924	Prague, Czechoslovakia	Czechoslovakia	–	1–4	Friendly
2	31 May 1925	Sofia, Bulgaria	Bulgaria	–	4–2	Friendly
3	31 May 1925	Sofia, Bulgaria	Bulgaria	–	4–2	Friendly
4	7 May 1926	Taksim Stadium, Istanbul, Turkey	Turkey	1–0	3–1	Friendly
5	7 May 1926	Taksim Stadium, Istanbul, Turkey	Turkey	3–0	3–1	Friendly
6	3 October 1926	Zagreb, Croatia	Czechoslovakia	–	3–2	King Alexander Cup

== Honours ==
Chinezul Timișoara

- Liga I (4): 1923–24, 1924–25, 1925–26, 1926–27

Bocskai Debrecen

- Hungarian Cup (1): 1929–30
