= 1930–31 Divizia A =

19th season of top-tier football league in Romania

Divizia A
- Season: 1930–31
- Champions: UD Reșița

The 1930–31 Divizia A was the nineteenth season of Divizia A, the top-level football league of Romania.

== Participating teams ==
Region	Team
East	Maccabi Cernăuți
North	Crișana Oradea
South	Prahova Ploiești
Center	Societatea Gimnastică Sibiu
West	UD Reșița

== Final Tournament of Regions ==
=== Preliminary round ===
Team 1	Score	Team 2
Crișana Oradea (Romania)	4–6	(Romania) Societatea Gimnastică Sibiu

=== Semifinals ===
Team 1	Score	Team 2
Prahova Ploiești (Romania)	2–3	(Romania) UD Reșița
Societatea Gimnastică Sibiu (Romania)	4–2	(Romania) Maccabi Cernăuți

=== Final ===
28 June 1931

UD Reșița	2–0	Societatea Gimnastică Sibiu
Lakatos 9', 84'

Reșița
Referee: Ștefan Lucescu

== Champion squad ==
UD Reșița

Goalkeepers: Carol Damacsek.
Defenders: Alexandru Pomacsek, Györi.
Midfielders: Sinko, Sepe, Jozsef Bundi.
Forwards: Fibișanu, Eugen Lakatos, Silviu Ploeșteanu, Jozsef Kilianovics, Moise.
(the players that played the final)

Manager: Ernest Loukota.
