= Mihai Tänzer =

Romanian-Hungarian footballer (1905–1993)

Mihai Tanzer
Personal information
- Date of birth: 7 February 1905
- Place of birth: Temesvár, Austria-Hungary
- Date of death: 22 September 1993 (aged 88)
- Place of death: Cluj-Napoca, Romania
- Position: Midfielder

Senior career*
Years	Team	Apps	(Gls)
1922–1929	Chinezul Timișoara	189	(55)
1929–1939	Ferencváros	381	(78)
1939–1940	Ripensia Timișoara	12	(2)
Total		582	(135)

International career
1923–1929	Romania	10	(1)
1929–1932	Hungary	5	(1)
- * Club domestic league appearances and goals

Mihai Tänzer (Hungarian: Táncos Mihály) (7 February 1905 – 22 September 1993) was a Romanian footballer of Danube Swabian (German) ethnicity, he also had Hungarian citizenship when he played in Hungary.

== Club career ==
In the early 1920s, Timișoara "Chinezul" dominated the Romanian football scene, even winning against important teams from the rest of Europe. Mihai Tänzer made his first senior appearance, at the age of 16, on the first team of the club, which already had 83 players. He soon found his place among the stalwarts as Ritter, Hoksary, Steiner, Wetzer, Semler and Vogl. A midfielder, in a few years he became one of the best European players in this position.

Chinezul was among the top teams of that time, alongside Juventus Bucharest, Venus Bucharest, CAO Oradea, Rapid Bucharest, C.A.T. Timișoara and AMEF Arad. During 1922–1927, "Chinezul", with Tänzer on the team, brought six consecutive national titles to Timișoara.

At the end of 1929, he arrived at Ferencváros, the most popular Hungarian club at that time, and was known there as Táncos Mihály. He played there for over a decade, winning three national titles, two cups, and one Mitropa Cup as well. At the 1938 Mitropa Cup, he faced Ripensia, another powerhouse team from Timișoara, which in the late 1930s won four national titles in Romania. Tänzer scored a goal against them in the last minutes, bringing Ferencváros a close 5–4 victory. After a year he went to play for Ripensia Timișoara, finishing his club career, and later ended up coaching them.

== International career ==
Tänzer made his debut for Romania on 2 September 1923 in a match against Poland ended 1–1. He represented his country at the 1924 Summer Olympics in Paris, he got 10 caps for Romania between 1923 and 1929 and scored once. In 1929, he went to play for neighbouring Hungary as "Táncos Mihály", and earned five caps scoring a goal.

Never giving up his Romanian citizenship, afterwards Táncos became Tänzer once again, returning to Romania and living the rest of his life in Cluj.

== Honours ==
Chinezul Timișoara

- Liga I: 6
  - 1922, 1923, 1924, 1925, 1926, 1927

Ferencváros TC

- Hungarian League: 3
  - 1932, 1934, 1938
- Magyar Kupa: 2
  - 1933, 1935
- Mitropa Cup: 1
  - 1937
