= CS Colțea Brașov =

Romanian football club

Colțea Brașov
- Full name: Clubul Sportiv; Colțea 1920 Brașov
- Short name: Colțea
- Founded: 1920; 106 years ago as Colțea Brașov; 2015; 11 years ago as CS Colțea 1920 Brașov
- Ground: Comunal
- Capacity: 1,000
- Chairman: Ciprian Jurubescu
- Manager: Andrei Pavel-Cojocaru
- League: not active at senior level
- Website: http://www.cscoltea.ro/index.php
Home colours	Away colours

CS Colțea Brașov is a football club based in Brașov, in central Romania. It was founded in 1920, and it soon became one of the best teams in the country, winning one Romanian Championship in 1928. The club was dissolved in 1931 and refounded in 2015. It currently plays in the Liga IV.

== History ==
A subsidiary of Colțea București, Colțea Brașov was founded in the year 1920 in Brașov by Vintilă Cristescu, Puiu Pavel and Iacobescu, all three of them being players of Colțea București. Colțea Brașov entered in the circuit of the local and national competitions in 1921. In 1925–1926, it won the regional championship, but in the national championship 1925–26, it was eliminated in the quarter-finals by AMEF Arad.

The next year, in 1926–27, the club reached the final of the national championship, but lost to Chinezul Timișoara 2–2 and 2–3. The squad that was used included the following players: Kiss – Zarkoszy, Columban, Balint, Ad. Hrehuss, Adamovici, Viszvari, Hecht, Şt. Torok, R. Auer, Csanz, Bertha.

In 1927–28 obtains the great performance, winning the final against Jiul Lupeni with 3–2 and the national championship. The players that were crowned champions were: Lobel – Columban, Balint, Şt. Torok, Csajka, Ad. Hrehuss, Kemeny, Gylebrowsky, Gruber, Hecht, Peterffi.

In 1928–29, present again at a national championship tournament was eliminated by Venus București in the quarter-finals. From then forward, being a military team, falls and disappears after 1931, giving its place in the Brașovian football to Brașovia Brașov and FC Brașov.

In the summer of 2015, Colțea Brașov was refounded as CS Colțea 1920 Brașov, at 84 years from the moment of its dissolution.

After one season Colțea Brașov signed an important association project with the Spanish club Celta de Vigo regarding the youth sector.

== Honours ==
Liga I:

- Winners (1): 1927–28
- Runners-up (1): 1926–27

Liga IV – Brașov County

- Runners-up (1): 2019–20

== See also ==
- Colțea București
