= Jahn Cernăuți =

Early 20th century German football club

- Full name: Jahn Cernăuți
- Short name: Jahn
- Founded: 1903
- Dissolved: 1940
- Ground: Jahnplatz
- Capacity: 1,000
Home colours	Away colours

Jahn Cernăuți was a German football club from Czernowitz, Bukovina (then in Austria-Hungary, subsequently Kingdom of Romania, nowadays in Ukraine). The club became regional champions in 1924, 1925, and 1934 and participated in three seasons of Divizia A (the first football tier in Romania). The club ceased to exist before the end of World War II.

== History ==
Jahn Cernăuți was founded in fall 1903, when German students in Chernivtsi have formed a football team. In 1908, the name was changed to the Association of Chernivtsi DFK. In spring 1909, a team broke away from the football club team from Chernivtsi, the new team was called IFC Czernowitz.

On 8 September 1910, Chernivtsi DFK merged with the German gymnastic society under the name of "Czernowitzer Turn- und Sportverein Jahn" (Sport and gymnastic society Jahn Chernivtsi), later Jahn Chernivtsi (Cernăuți).

The football team participated in the 1920 Regional Championship of Bucovina. In the 1923–1924 season, becoming Regional Champion, Jahn Chernivtsi qualified for Romanian Championship final tournament. After Brașovia Brașov did not show off, Jahn promoted to the semifinals where they lost 0–1 to Clubul Atletic Oradea.

The next season, the club become Regional Champion again and qualified again for Romanian Championship final tournament. In the first round they eliminated Șoimii Sibiu. In the quarterfinals, Fulgerul Chişinău defeated the team from Chernivtsi, but after the team from Bessarabia was disqualified and the result was annulled. Jahn Chernivtsi replayed the match with Oltul Slatina (champion of Oltenia), whom Jahn Chernivtsi defeated 4–0. In the semifinals, Jahn Chernivtsi was defeated by UCAS Petrosani. This was the best performance of the team in the history of Romania League.

The team played in the Regional Championship of Bukovina. The winner of each edition obtained the right to participate in the final tournament of the Romanian Championship.

Every ethnicity had their own team in Chernivtsi: Romanians (Dragoş Vodă Cernăuţi), Germans (Jahn Cernăuți), Jews (Maccabi Cernăuți and Hakoah Cernăuți), Poles (Polonia Cernăuți), and Ukrainians (Dovbuș Cernăuți).

The team founded in 1903 ceased to exist in 1940, after the Bukovina Germans moved back to Germany with the start of World War II, and when the Soviets invaded Bukovina. They founded a new team called TSV Jahn Büsnau, a team from Stuttgart region.

== Chronology of names ==
Name	Period
Chernivtsi Deutscher Fußballklub	1903–1910
Jahn Chernivtsi (Cernăuți)	1910–1940

== Divizia A History ==
Season	League	Pos.	Played	W	D	L	GS	GA	Points	Notes	Ref
1923–24	Divizia A	SF (3rd–4th)	2	1	–	1	3	1	2p	Lost in SF against Clubul Atletic Oradea.	
1924–25	Divizia A	SF (3rd–4th)	3	2	–	1	8	3	4p	Lost in SF against UCAS Petroşani.	

== Performances ==
- Semifinalist in Championship of Romania (2): 1923–24, 1924–25
- 3rd Place Divizia B (2): 1934–35, 1935–36
- Victory in Cupa României Final Phase Tournament: 1936–37 against Textila Moldova Iași.

== Honours ==
- Bucovina Championship (Romanian: Campionatul Bucovinei)
  - Winners (4): 1923–24, 1924–25, 1933–34, 1939–40

== See also ==
- Bukovina Germans
