= Brașovia Brașov =

Defunct Romanian football club

- Full name: Clubul Sportiv Brașovia Brașov
- Short name: Brașovia
- Founded: 1919
- Dissolved: 1937
- Ground: Stadionul „Sub Strajă”
Home colours	Away colours

Clubul Sportiv Brașovia Brașov, commonly known as Brașovia Brașov or simply Brașovia, was a Romanian football club based in Brașov. Founded in 1919, it was one of the main football clubs in the city during the interwar period, alongside Colțea Brașov.

Brașovia won the Brașov regional championship several times and regularly qualified for the national championship tournament. Its best result was a semi-final appearance in 1924–25. The club later played two seasons in the national Divizia A before dropping into the lower divisions and ceasing activity in 1937.

== History ==
Brașovia was formed in 1919. Although some later sources give 1914 as the club's foundation year, a reconstruction based on contemporary reports from Brassói Lapok places its establishment in 1919.

The club initially played in black shirts and white shorts. Samuel Ritter served as president, while local businessman Béni Szabó helped finance the club and secure land for a football ground.

During the 1920s, Brașovia became one of the strongest teams in the Brașov regional championship. It won regional titles in 1922–23, 1923–24, 1924–25, 1927–28, 1928–29, 1929–30 and 1930–31.

The club took part in the national championship tournament in 1922–23, 1923–24, 1924–25 and 1929–30. In 1923–24, it lost 0–3 by forfeit to Jahn Cernăuți in the quarter-finals.

Brașovia achieved its best national result in 1924–25. It defeated CA Oradea 2–1 in the quarter-finals before losing 0–3 to eventual champions Chinezul Timișoara in the semi-finals.

In 1922, the club opened its own ground, known as Stadionul „Sub Strajă”. It was located near the present-day Nicolae Titulescu Park and remained in use until redevelopment of the area began in 1932.

Several Brașovia players later represented Romania. Leopold Tritsch and Oszkar Tritsch became the first players from Brașov to play for the national team, while Iuliu Bodola later became one of Romania's leading international goalscorers.

Brașovia joined the national league system in 1932–33, finishing seventh in Series II with one point from twelve matches.

The club remained in Divizia A for 1933–34, again finishing seventh in its series. Its only league victory that season was a 6–0 win over Tricolor Ploiești. Brașovia was relegated at the end of the campaign.

It also took part in the inaugural 1933–34 Cupa României, losing 1–6 to Olimpia CFR Satu Mare in the Round of 32.

After relegation, Brașovia continued in the lower divisions. It played in the Central League of the 1936–37 Divizia C, finishing fifth, but did not enter the following season. The club is therefore generally considered to have ceased activity in 1937.

Its disappearance came six years after that of Colțea Brașov, its main local rival during the 1920s. The two clubs had dominated football in Brașov during that decade. In the following years, the city's leading football role passed mainly to IAR Brașov and Uzinele Astra Brașov.

== National championship record ==
Season	Stage reached	Result
1922–23	National tournament	Eliminated
1923–24	Quarter-finals	Lost 0–3 to Jahn Cernăuți by forfeit
1924–25	Semi-finals	Lost 0–3 to Chinezul Timișoara
1929–30	National tournament	Eliminated

== Divizia A record ==
Season	Group	P	W	D	L	GF	GA	Pts	Position
1932–33	Series II	12	0	1	11	10	31	1	7th
1933–34	Series I	14	1	2	11	18	54	4	7th
Total		26	1	3	22	28	85	5	

== Honours ==
Romanian Championship

- Semi-finals (1): 1924–25

Brașov Regional Championship

- Winners (7): 1922–23, 1923–24, 1924–25, 1927–28, 1928–29, 1929–30, 1930–31

== Notable former players ==
- (Romania) Iuliu Bodola
- (Romania) Alexander Geller
- (Romania) Leopold Tritsch
- (Romania) Oszkar Tritsch
- (Romania) János Tóth
- (Romania) Antal Bányai
- (Romania) László Zsigmond

== League history ==
Season	Tier	Division	Place	Notes
1938–39	Club dissolved in January 1939			
1937–38	4	Brașov District Championship (Series I)	1st (C)	Seventh district title
1936–37	3	Divizia C (Central League)	5th	Withdrew from Divizia C after the season
1935–36	2	Divizia B (Series I)	8th (R)	Relegated
1934–35	2	Divizia B (Series I)	6th	
1933–34	1	Divizia A (Series I)	7th (R)	Relegated
1932–33	1	Divizia A (Series II)	7th	Won relegation play-off
1931–32	Regional	Brașov District Championship	2nd	Selected for the inaugural Divizia A
1930–31	Regional	Brașov District Championship	1st (C)	Disqualified in the Central League final
1929–30	1	Divizia A	Preliminary round	Brașov district champions
1928–29	Regional	Brașov District Championship	6th	
1927–28	Regional	Brașov District Championship	6th	
1926–27	Regional	Brașov District Championship	3rd	
1925–26	Regional	Brașov District Championship	2nd	
1924–25	1	Divizia A	3rd	Brașov district champions; semi-finals
1923–24	1	Divizia A	Quarter-finals	Brașov district champions
1922–23	1	Divizia A	Quarter-finals	Brașov district champions
1921–22	Regional	Brașov District Championship	1st (C)	2nd in the combined Brașov–Sibiu spring phase
1914–21	Early and local activity; organized club activity documented from 1919			

== See also ==
- Colțea Brașov
- FC Brașov
- Tractorul Brașov
- CFR Brașov
- Corona Brașov

== Bibliography ==
- Grüne, Hardy (2000). Enzyklopädie der europäischen Fußballvereine (in German) (1st ed.). Kassel: AGON Sportverlag. p. 332. ISBN 3-89784-163-0.
