= 1934–35 Divizia B =

1st season of the Divizia B, the second tier of the Romanian football league

Divizia B
- Season: 1934–35
- Champions: Jiul Petroșani
- Promoted: None
- Relegated: CA Arad; Ceramica Bistrița; Vitrometan Mediaș; Unirea CFR Pașcani

The 1934–35 Divizia B was the first season of the second tier of the Romanian football league system.

The champions of each of the five series qualified to a play-off round. The winner of this play-off played against the last placed team in the 1934–35 Divizia A.

Jiul Petroşani won the play-off, but they lost the promotion to AMEF Arad.

== League standings ==
=== Seria I ===
Pos	Team	Pld	W	D	L	GF	GA	GD	Pts
1	Maccabi București	14	8	3	3	31	13	+18	19
2	CFR Brașov	14	8	3	3	35	15	+20	19
3	Elpis Constanța	14	7	4	3	20	12	+8	18
4	Victoria Constanța	14	6	4	4	19	16	+3	16
5	Sportul Studențesc București	14	6	3	5	20	19	+1	15
6	Brașovia Brașov	14	4	2	8	17	29	−12	10
7	Prahova Ploiești	14	3	4	7	14	26	−12	10
8	Tricolor Ploiești	14	1	3	10	14	40	−26	5

Source: romaniansoccer.ro

=== Seria II ===
Pos	Team	Pld	W	D	L	GF	GA	GD	Pts
1	Jiul Petroșani	14	10	3	1	48	14	+34	23
2	ILSA Timișoara	14	10	1	3	42	26	+16	21
3	Vulturii Textila Lugoj	14	7	1	6	27	31	−4	15
4	RGM Timișoara	14	6	3	5	31	24	+7	15
5	UD Reșița	14	5	2	7	35	27	+8	12
6	CA Timișoara	14	4	4	6	33	25	+8	12
7	Rovine Grivița Craiova	14	4	3	7	30	39	−9	11
8	CA Arad	14	1	1	12	14	74	−60	3

Source: romaniansoccer.ro

=== Seria III ===
Pos	Team	Pld	W	D	L	GF	GA	GD	Pts
1	Phoenix Baia Mare	14	14	0	0	63	14	+49	28
2	Tricolor Baia Mare	14	7	3	4	29	23	+6	17
3	Stăruința Oradea	14	7	3	4	16	15	+1	17
4	Olimpia CFR Satu Mare	14	6	1	7	27	25	+2	13
5	CFR Cluj	14	4	3	7	21	27	−6	11
6	CFR Oradea	14	3	4	7	24	45	−21	10
7	CA Cluj	14	4	1	9	18	30	−12	9
8	Ceramica Bistrița	14	3	1	10	22	41	−19	7

Source: romaniansoccer.ro

=== Seria IV ===
Pos	Team	Pld	W	D	L	GF	GA	GD	Pts
1	Societatea Gimnastică Sibiu	14	9	3	2	30	22	+8	21
2	CFR Simeria	14	8	3	3	46	22	+24	19
3	Mureșul Târgu Mureș	14	8	3	3	33	25	+8	19
4	Sticla Diciosânmartin	13	5	2	6	22	22	0	12
5	Societatea Sportivă Sibiu	14	4	3	7	15	22	−7	11
6	Unirea MV Alba Iulia	14	3	4	7	23	25	−2	10
7	Șoimii Sibiu	13	3	4	6	20	25	−5	10
8	Vitrometan Mediaș	14	2	4	8	16	42	−26	8

Source: romaniansoccer.ro

=== Seria V ===
Pos	Team	Pld	W	D	L	GF	GA	GD	Pts
1	Dacia Unirea IG Brăila	14	12	2	0	37	7	+30	26
2	Franco-Româna Brăila	14	8	2	4	29	15	+14	18
3	Jahn Cernăuți	14	7	3	4	33	21	+12	17
4	Textila Moldova Iași	14	7	2	5	24	17	+7	16
5	Sporting Chișinău	14	4	4	6	26	36	−10	12
6	Dacia Vasile Alecsandri Galați	14	5	1	8	29	31	−2	11
7	Stadiul Bacăoan Bacău	14	3	0	11	16	41	−25	6
8	Unirea CFR Pașcani	14	3	0	11	16	42	−26	6

Source: romaniansoccer.ro

== League play-off ==
Pos	Team	Pld	W	D	L	GF	GA	GD	Pts
1	Jiul Petroșani	8	5	2	1	21	13	+8	12
2	Phoenix Baia Mare	8	4	3	1	21	13	+8	11
3	Macabi București	8	3	2	3	18	15	+3	8
4	Dacia Unirea IG Brăila	8	2	1	5	12	17	−5	5
5	Societatea Gimnastică Sibiu	8	2	0	6	12	26	−14	4

Source: romaniansoccer.ro

== Promotion / relegation play-off ==
Team 1	Agg.	Team 2	1st leg	2nd leg
AMEF Arad	2–0	Jiul Petroșani	2–0	0–0

== See also ==
- 1934–35 Divizia A
