= Maccabi Cernăuți =

Maccabi Cernăuți (Chernivtsi)
- Full name: Football Club Maccabi Cernăuți
- Short name: Maccabi
- Founded: 1909
- Dissolved: 1941
- Ground: Stadionul Dragoș Vodă
- Capacity: 2 800

Maccabi Cernăuți was a Jewish football club from Czernowitz/Cernăuți, Austria-Hungary

== History ==
During the interwar period participated in regional championships. At the end of the 1926–27 season, they became for the first time regional champions, and participated in the Divizia A national championship. They were eliminated in the preliminary round when they played with Mihai Viteazul Chișinău.

Preliminary Round(Eights of finals)

Team 1	Score	Team 2
Mihai Viteazul Chișinău (Romania)	6–0	(Romania) Maccabi Cernăuți

In late 20s, it merged with the other team Hakoah Cernăuți, to form a more competitive team, twice becoming regional champions and participated in the national championship, in the seasons 1930–31 and 1931–32.

1930–31 Semifinals

Team 1	Score	Team 2
Societatea Gimnastică Sibiu (Romania)	4–2	(Romania) Maccabi Cernăuți

1931–32 Semifinals

Team 1	Score	Team 2
Venus București (Romania)	5–0	(Romania) Maccabi Cernăuți

== Honours ==
Liga I

- Semifinals(2): 1930–31, 1931–32
