= CS Muncitorul Reșița =

Romanian football club (1911–2017)

Muncitorul Reșița
- Full name: Clubul Sportiv Muncitorul Reșița
- Nickname(s): Gospodarii (The Households)
- Short name: Muncitorul
- Founded: 1911
- Dissolved: 2017
- Ground: Muncitorul
- Capacity: 1,000
- 2016–17: Liga IV, Caraș-Severin, 11th
Home colours	Away colours

Muncitorul Reșița was a Romanian professional football club from Reșița, Caraș-Severin County, Romania, founded in 1911 and dissolved in 2017.

== History ==
The club promoted to the Liga III at the end of the 2004–05 season, after a very long time, but the joy was short, because it relegated after only one season.

After three seasons in fourth division, in which he finished each time in second place, Muncitorul, returns to Liga III by FRF decision to fill the vacant seats, but it relegated again.

It promoted back to the Liga III in the summer of 2012. It finished 7th in the 2012–13 season.

Gospodarii finished 2016–17 Liga IV season on the 11th place, but in the summer of 2017 the club didn't enrolled the senior team in any league, due to financial problems.

== Chronology of names ==
Period	Name
Clubul Muncitorilor din Reșița	1911–1919
Club Sportiv al Muncitorilor din România	1919–1921
Societatea Sportivă a Muncitorilor din România	1921–1946
Locomotiva Reșița	1946–1949
Progresul Reșița	1949–1950
Asociaţia Sportivă Muncitorul Reșița	1950–1988
Asociaţia Sportivă Muncitorul Știința Reșița	1988–1990
Asociaţia Sportivă Muncitorul Reșița	1990–2002
Club Sportiv Muncitorul Reșița	2002–2017

== Honours ==
- Liga III / Divizia C
  - Winners (1): 1937–38

Liga IV – Caraș-Severin County

- Winners (2): 2004–05, 2011–12
- Runners-up (3): 1975–76, 2006–07, 2008–09
