= ILSA Timișoara =

- Full name: Industria Lânii Societate Anonimă Timișoara
- Short name: ILSA
- Founded: 1922
- Dissolved: 1936
- Ground: Stadionul ILSA, Timișoara
- Capacity: 2,000
Home colours

ILSA Timișoara (Industria Lânii Societate Anonimă Timișoara) (English: Society of Anonymous Wool Industry Timișoara) was a football team from Timișoara, Timiș County, Romania.

== History ==
ILSA Timișoara was founded in 1922, with players and workers of the wool factory from Timișoara. (Industria Lânii = Wool Industry)

They spend most of the time in Timișoara County League. Their best performance was to win Divizia B in 1936, the current Liga II. But they lost the Promotion / Relegation Play-off for next year of Divizia A against Universitatea Cluj with 5–1 on Aggregate. This was also the last games in their history because in that summer ILSA Timișoara merged with the most famous team of those year, Chinezul Timișoara.

The merge was not a success because the results did not appear, and in just 10 years, in 1946, Chinezul Timișoara disbanded also. Chinezul Timișoara is the best team of Timișoara in the whole history, with 6 titles won in the First Romanian League, followed by FC Ripensia Timișoara with 4 titles.

== Performances ==
League Play-off won (1): 1935–36

Promotion / Relegation Play-off (for 1936–37 Divizia A) – Lost – against Universitatea Cluj.

== Honours ==
Liga II:

- Winners (1): 1935–36

- Runners-up (1): 1934–35
