= FC Carmen București =

Carmen București
- Full name: Fotbal Club Carmen București
- Short name: Carmen
- Founded: 1922; 104 years ago; 2017; 9 years ago
- Dissolved: 1947; 79 years ago; 2020; 6 years ago
- 2018–19: Liga IV, Bucharest, 1st
| Home colours | Away colours |

Carmen București was a Romanian football club based in Bucharest.

In 2017, Carmen București was refounded and introduced in the Liga IV, the fourth tier of the Romanian football league system.

In the summer of 2019, owner of Carmen bought Sportul Snagov and merged the two entities, following that in the summer of 2020 the club will be renamed as Carmen București.

== History ==
=== Early period ===
Carmen, which originally took the name of its owner, Ionel Mociorniță, started to play in Liga III but when Liga I was reorganised after the war gained a place in the top league, as the team incorporated few of the best-known players at the time.

During the break of the 1946–47 season, at which end Carmen was runner-up, the team was ordered by the Government to play a friendly game against FC Dinamo Tbilisi, a Soviet team, after being also advised to "lose", as the game was supposed to be communist propaganda. Mociorniţă, which by the way was a well-known anti-communist, accepted the game but refused to "lose".

The situation was not forgotten by the authorities and in the summer of 1947, just one week before the start of the 1947–48 season, the team was refused its place in Liga I and immediately dissolved.

=== Refounding ===
After it was refounded in 2017 and played in the fourth league, at the end of the 2017–2018 season ended up on the fifth place.

The next season finished the regular season on the second place and participated in the playoffs with Steaua București, CS FC Dinamo București and Progresul 2005 Bucharest. After three wins became the fourth league's champions and were allowed to play a promotion game for the third league against Mostiștea Ulmu the champions of Călărași County. After 3–3 away, at home was a disappointing 1–2, which denied the club access to the third league. The owner did not register the club for the 2019–2020 fourth league competition.

In the summer of 2019, Ovidiu Onosă, owner of Carmen București bought Sportul Snagov and merged the two entities, following that in the summer of 2020 the club will be renamed as Carmen București. After a weak first part of the championship and due to historical debts of the club, Onosă withdrew and took the control of Liga III side Dacia Unirea Brăila instead. Carmen București was excluded subsequently and then dissolved.

== Honours ==
=== Domestic ===
==== Leagues ====
- Liga I / Divizia A
  - Runners-up (1): 1946–47
- Liga III / Divizia C
  - Winners (1): 1937–38
- Liga IV – Bucharest
  - Winners (1): 2018–19

==== Cups ====
- Cupa României – Bucharest
  - Runners-up (1): 2018–19

== League history ==
| Season | Tier | Division | Place | Notes |
|---|---|---|---|---|
| 2019–20 | Club dissolved | | | |
| 2018–19 | 4 | Liga IV (Bucharest) | 1st (C) | Lost Liga III promotion play-off |
| 2017–18 | 4 | Liga IV (Bucharest) | 5th | 55 points |
| 1947–2017 | Not active | | | |
| 1946–47 | 1 | Divizia A | 2nd | Club dissolved after the season |
| 1945–46 | Regional | Bucharest District Championship | 1st (C, P) | Promoted to Divizia A |
| 1939–45 | Regional | WW II + Bucharest District Championship | — | Renamed Carmen in 1940 |
| 1938–39 | 2 | Divizia B (East Series, South Group) | 10th (R) | As Mociornița-Colțea București |
| 1937–38 | 3 | Divizia C (South League, Series II) | 1st (P) | Series winners; promoted |
| 1922–37 | Founded in 1922; competed in Bucharest district championships from 1924 | | | |
