= Los Sports =

Chilean sports magazine

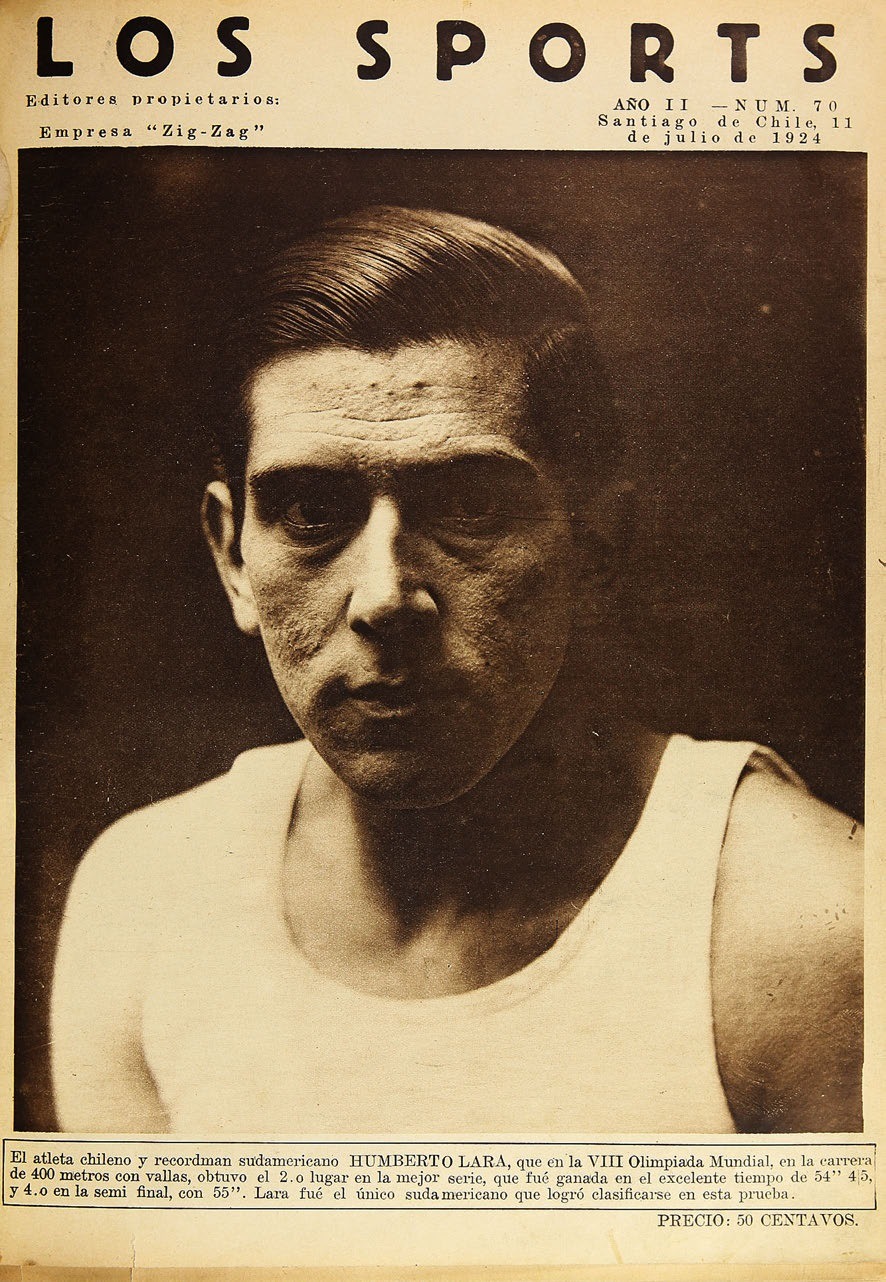
Los Sports, volume 70, 11 July 1924

Los Sports was a Chilean sports magazine established on 16 March, 1923. The magazine primarily covered swimming, athletics, golf, horse riding, boxing, basketball, and hockey. It featured interviews with leading figures in sports and politics. Los Sports was in circulation until 1931, during which a total of 418 issues were published.
