= AS CFR Brașov =

Defunct Romanian football club

CFR Brașov
- Full name: Asociația Sportivă CFR Brașov
- Nicknames: Viteziștii vișinii (The Maroon Speedsters)
- Short name: CFR
- Founded: 1920
- Dissolved: 2013
- Ground: Stadionul CFR
- Capacity: 8,000
Home colours	Away colours

Asociația Sportivă CFR Brașov, commonly known as CFR Brașov or ACFR Brașov, was a Romanian football club based in Brașov, Brașov County. Founded in 1920 as the football team of the local Romanian Railways workshops, the club affiliated to the Romanian football federation in 1923.

CFR reached the Romanian top flight for the only time in 1937–38. After the Second World War, teams using the CFR Brașov name continued in the lower national and county leagues. The senior team withdrew from Liga IV Brașov in 2013 because of financial problems.

== History ==
CFR Brașov was founded in 1920 as Asociația Căilor Ferate Române Brașov (ACFR), representing employees of the railway workshops in Brașov. The club joined the national football federation in 1923 and initially competed in the local championship.

During the 1930s, ACFR became one of the strongest clubs in Brașov. It took part in the inaugural 1933–34 Cupa României, defeating Jiul Petroșani before losing to UD Reșița in the Round of 16.

The club was a founding member of Divizia B in 1934–35 and finished second in its series in each of its first three seasons. In 1936–37, ACFR finished second in the Eastern Series with 34 points from 24 matches.

The expansion of Divizia A to twenty clubs allowed ACFR to gain promotion for the 1937–38 season.

CFR was placed in Series II and finished ninth of ten teams, with four wins, three draws and eleven defeats. The club scored 26 goals and conceded 45.

Among its results were a 5–0 victory over Crișana Oradea and a 3–0 win against Dragoș Vodă Cernăuți. CFR was relegated at the end of the season when Divizia A returned to a single-group format.

Back in Divizia B, ACFR finished eighth in its group in 1938–39.

The club also played in the 1937–38 Cupa României, where it was eliminated in the Round of 32 by Mica Brad.

After the Second World War, CFR Brașov returned to national competition. RomanianSoccer records teams using the CFR name in Divizia B and Divizia C before disappearing from the national divisions in 1949.

Nicolae Oaidă played for Locomotiva CFR Brașov between 1951 and 1953 before moving to Dinamo Brașov.

CFR later competed mainly in county football. By the early 2010s, AS CFR Brașov was playing in Liga IV Brașov.

In 2011–12, the club spent part of the season near the top of the standings.

CFR started the 2012–13 season strongly and was third at the end of the autumn part of the championship, three points behind the leader.

Despite its league position, the club withdrew from the competition at the beginning of 2013 because of financial problems. It did not return to senior competition afterwards.

== Stadium ==
CFR Brașov played at the Stadionul CFR in the Triaj area of Brașov.

During the club's final years, work at the ground occasionally forced the team to use alternative venues. In 2012, CFR played some home matches at the Brașovia ground.

== Divizia A record ==
Season	Group	P	W	D	L	GF	GA	Pts	Position
1937–38	Series II	18	4	3	11	26	45	11	9th

== Honours ==
Divizia B

- Runners-up (3): 1934–35, 1935–36, 1936–37

== Notable former players ==
- (Romania) Géza Nagy-Csomag
- (Romania) Ferenc Székely
- (Romania) Nicolae Oaidă

== See also ==
- Colțea Brașov
- Brașovia Brașov
- FC Brașov
- Tractorul Brașov
- Corona Brașov
