= Mihai Viteazul Chișinău =

- Full name: Mihai Viteazul Chișinău
- Nickname: moldovenii
- Short name: Mihai Viteazul Chișinău
- Founded: 1920
- Dissolved: 1940
- Ground: Mihai Viteazul, Chișinău
- Capacity: 3,000
Home colours

Mihai Viteazul Chișinău was a football club from Chișinău, Kingdom of Romania. This is the most titled club in the interwar Bessarabia from Chișinău. Along with Fulgerul Chișinău is the only team that reached the semifinals in Romania interwar league.

== History ==
The club was founded in 1920 by brothers Vâlcov (Vasile, Colea, Petea and Volodea), under the name of "Viteaz". In 1925 the name was changed to "Mihai Viteazul Chișinău". In the 1924–1925 season the team lost the title of champion of Bassarabia to the rival Fulgerul Chișinău. In the 1926–1927 season, Mihai Viteazul Chișinău manages to win the regional championship, thus qualifying for the final tournament of Division A, where he smashed Maccabi Cernăuţi with the score 6–0. He attended the quarterfinal clash with Unirea Tricolor București, and after a match ended in a draw 4–4, the match was replayed the next day, where Mihai Viteazul Chișinău lost in overtime 3–1.

After that, Mihai Viteazul Chișinău participated in the final phase for three consecutive seasons.

The 1927–1928 season went in the first round of Concordia Iaşi with the score 9–1 and in the quarterfinals with Polonia Cernăuţi, which defeated 5–2. In the semifinals the team was eliminated by the future champion that year, Colţea Braşov.

In the 1928–1929 season, after winning the championship Bassarabia, the team participated in the final of the Romanian Championship, but was eliminated in the first round by Dragoş Vodă Cernăuţi 1–0.

In the 1929–1930 season, Mihai Viteazul Chișinău won the regional championship, then participate in the tournament where he eliminated it in the first round on Concordia Iaşi with the score 4–2. In the last quarter of Dragoş Vodă Cernăuţi 4–2 in the semifinals and lost to Juventus Bucharest, which was to win the championship in that season.

In season 1938–1939 Series team entered in East appears to Division B and all that year participating for the first and only time in the Romanian Cup, where she met her final sixteenth of Unirea Tricolor București, which failed to move on, being defeated 9–1.

== Notable players ==
- Petea Vâlcov
- Colea Vâlcov
- Volodea Vâlcov

== Literature ==
- Hardy Grüne (2000), Enzyklopädie der europäischen Fußballvereine (in German) (1. ed.), Kassel: AGON Sportverlag, p. 339, ISBN 3-89784-163-0
