= Maccabi București =

Maccabi București Ciocanul Dinamo A
- Full name: Maccabi București
- Founded: 15 May 1919
- Dissolved: 1948
- Ground: Calea Dudeşti
Home colours	Away colours

Maccabi or Macabi București, later known as Ciocanul, was a Romanian sport club, representing the Jewish community, akin to the famous Hakoah Vienna. Named after the Maccabees and centering on football competitions, it was the first Jewish side to send a player, the goalkeeper Samuel Zauber, to the FIFA World Cup (at its 1930 edition in Uruguay).

== History ==
Maccabi București was founded in 1919 by a Jewish entrepreneur at a time when representatives of the ethnic minorities of Greater Romania established distinctive football sides (another such example was Elpis Constanța, which was owned by a Greek-Romanian businessman). In 1925, a women's seven-a-side handball team was inaugurated as a branch of the Maccabi club, but, like all Romanian teams of the time, only played exhibition games (usually, as a prelude to competitive football matches).

Before the 1940–1941 season, at a time when Romania adopted antisemitic policies, the club was expelled from official competitions. It reemerged in 1945 at the end of World War II and kept its name before merging with another club to form Ciocanul.

For the 1946 season, the club was coached by Hungarian coach Béla Guttmann, who went on to coach many prominent European and South American teams of the 1940s and 1950s. Due to food shortages, Guttmann insisted his salary be paid in vegetables. He subsequently walked out on the Romanian club after a director attempted to intervene in team selection. German journalist Hardy Grune believed that he was frustrated with the corruption in the Romanian soccer world.

As Ciocanul, the club played in two seasons in Divizia A. In May 1948, it merged with Unirea Tricolor București, to create the present-day major Romanian club Dinamo, which was administrated by the Ministry of the Interior. During the 1947–1948 season they remained two separate clubs: Dinamo A (Ciocanul) and Dinamo B (Unirea-Tricolor).

== Honours ==
Liga I:

- Winners (0):, Best finish: 7th 1946–47

Liga II:

- Winners (1): 1934–35
- Runners-up (1): 1938–39
