= Societatea Gimnastică Sibiu =

Defunct Romanian football club

- Full name: Societatea de Gimnastică Sibiu
- Founded: 1919
- Dissolved: 1945
- Ground: Stadionul de Educație Fizică
- Capacity: 5,000
Home colours	Away colours

Societatea de Gimnastică Sibiu (German: Hermannstädter Turnverein, abbreviated HTV; literally "Sibiu Gymnastics Society") was a Romanian football club based in Sibiu, Sibiu County. It represented the football section of the Hermannstädter Turnverein, a multi-sport organisation founded on 30 October 1862 by the city's Transylvanian Saxon community. The football section began activity in 1919 and became one of Sibiu's leading interwar teams.

The club's greatest achievement was finishing as runners-up in the 1930–31 Divizia A, when it reached the national final before losing 0–2 to UD Reșița. The football section disappeared following the Second World War, around 1945.

== History ==
=== Origins and establishment of the football section ===
The Hermannstädter Turnverein was founded on 30 October 1862, when Sibiu was part of the Austrian Empire, with the principal aim of promoting physical education among the city's youth. After gymnastics became a compulsory school subject in 1865, the organisation initially functioned predominantly as a gymnastics society.

During the following decades, HTV gradually expanded its sporting activities. Fencing was practised from around 1870, regular gymnastics festivals were organised from 1890, and a women's gymnastics section was established in September 1896. During part of the 1890s, the organisation used the German name Hermannstädter Männerturnverein, before returning to Hermannstädter Turnverein.

Tennis was introduced within the society in 1903, while organised sporting activity was subsequently interrupted by the First World War. The club resumed its activities in January 1919.

Football began to be played within the society during the spring of 1919. Weekly programmes from that period included football matches and training sessions, and the sport soon developed into one of HTV's principal competitive sections.

=== Rise in regional football (1919–1929) ===
During the 1920s, the Romanian football championship was organised primarily through regional competitions, whose winners qualified for the national final tournament.

Societatea de Gimnastică gradually became one of the strongest teams in the Sibiu regional championship and first reached the national stage in 1925–26. In the quarter-finals, SG Sibiu travelled to Bucharest, where it lost 1–3 to Juventus București.

The club qualified again in 1926–27. This time, SG Sibiu was eliminated in the preliminary round after a 2–3 home defeat against Unirea Tricolor București.

During this period, SG Sibiu established itself alongside other local clubs as one of the principal football representatives of the city.

=== National championship appearances and the 1931 final (1929–1931) ===
Societatea de Gimnastică returned to the national championship in 1929–30. After qualifying through the regional competition, the team reached the national quarter-finals but suffered a 0–7 away defeat against Universitatea Cluj.

The 1930–31 season became the most successful in the club's history. SG Sibiu again qualified from the regional championship and advanced to the national phase.

In the first national round, played on 7 June 1931 in Oradea, Societatea de Gimnastică defeated Crișana Oradea 6–4 in a high-scoring match. One week later, playing in Sibiu, SG defeated Maccabi Cernăuți 4–2 in the semi-final and qualified for the Romanian championship final for the first and only time in its history.

The final was played on 28 June 1931 against UD Reșița in Reșița. The home side won 2–0, with both goals scored by Eugen Lakatos, leaving Societatea de Gimnastică as Romanian championship runners-up.

The runners-up finish remains one of the most significant achievements in the history of football in Sibiu.

=== Divizia B years (1931–1936) ===
Following its national runners-up campaign, Societatea de Gimnastică remained active in regional football. In 1931–32, the club finished behind Șoimii Sibiu and Unirea Alba Iulia in the Sibiu regional championship and did not qualify for the national final tournament.

The reorganisation of Romanian football into permanent national divisions changed the club's competitive position. SG Sibiu did not become a regular member of the newly structured Divizia A and subsequently competed at second-tier level.

When Divizia B was established in its national format in 1934, Societatea de Gimnastică became one of the participants in the inaugural season.

In 1934–35, SG Sibiu produced an excellent campaign and won Series IV, collecting 21 points from 14 matches and finishing ahead of CFR Simeria and Mureșul Târgu Mureș.

The five Divizia B series winners entered a separate promotion play-off. SG Sibiu recorded two victories and six defeats and finished 5th, failing to earn promotion to Divizia A.

The same season brought a notable Cupa României run. SG Sibiu defeated Maccabi Cernăuți 4–0 in the Round of 32 before being eliminated after a 1–4 defeat against CFR București in the Round of 16.

In the 1935–36 season, SG Sibiu finished 6th in its series and subsequently dropped out of the national second division.

During the mid-1930s, the organisation's German identity also became the subject of administrative pressure. Romanian football authorities encouraged the use of the Romanian abbreviation SG Sibiu rather than HTV in official competition. In 1935, the parent sporting organisation adopted the name Hermannstädter Turnverein "Armin".

=== Final years and dissolution (1936–1945) ===
After leaving Divizia B, the football section returned to regional competition and gradually lost the national prominence it had enjoyed during the late 1920s and early 1930s.

The outbreak of the Second World War severely disrupted organised sport. Political and territorial changes in Transylvania also affected the activity of German sporting organisations, including the Hermannstädter Turnverein.

During the war years, sporting activity continued on a more limited basis through local competitions and events organised within the German community, but the football team no longer returned to the upper levels of the Romanian national league system.

Following the end of the Second World War, the Hermannstädter Turnverein was dissolved around 1945, and its football section consequently ceased to exist.

The disappearance of SG Sibiu ended approximately twenty-six years of organised football activity for one of the most important interwar clubs in the city.

== Stadium ==
From 1927, Societatea de Gimnastică played its home matches at the Stadionul de Educație Fizică, situated near Sub Arini Park in Sibiu. The ground was inaugurated in 1927 and was subsequently expanded and redeveloped into the modern Stadionul Municipal.

The ground was one of the principal sporting venues in interwar Sibiu and was used by several of the city's football clubs.

== Divizia A record ==
In the period before the introduction of the permanent national league format in 1932, the Romanian championship was decided through a knockout tournament contested by regional champions. Societatea de Gimnastică qualified for the national phase on four occasions.

Season	Stage reached	P	W	D	L	GF	GA	Result
1925–26	Quarter-finals	1	0	0	1	1	3	Eliminated by Juventus București
1926–27	Preliminary round	1	0	0	1	2	3	Eliminated by Unirea Tricolor București
1929–30	Quarter-finals	1	0	0	1	0	7	Eliminated by Universitatea Cluj
1930–31	Runners-up	3	2	0	1	10	8	Lost final to UD Reșița
Total		6	2	0	4	13	21	

== Honours ==
Divizia A

- Runners-up (1): 1930–31

Divizia B

- Winners (1): 1934–35

== Bibliography ==
- Hardy Grüne (2000), Enzyklopädie der europäischen Fußballvereine (in German) (1st ed.), Kassel: AGON Sportverlag, p. 337, ISBN 3-89784-163-0
