= Chinezul Timișoara =

Defunct football club

- Full name: Chinezul Timișoara
- Founded: 1910; 116 years ago
- Dissolved: 1946; 80 years ago
- Ground: Banatul
- Capacity: 7,000
Home colours

Chinezul Timișoara was a football club that played both in the Romanian and the Hungarian championship during its existence. It was based in Timișoara, Romania (at the time of foundation Temesvár, Austria-Hungary).

== History ==
The club was established in 1910 under the name Temesvári Kinizsi SE with the support of the local Rail Workers' Association. It was named after Pál Kinizsi, a general in the army of king Matthias Corvinus and Comes of Temes. The crest of the club also reflected to it, as it featured an arm holding a mill stone. This was related to old Hungarian folk tales which stated that Pál Kinizsi was a very strong miller who offered the king a glass of water on a mill stone with one hand instead of a platter. The team played its first ever match on 6 May 1911 against the Temesvár FC.

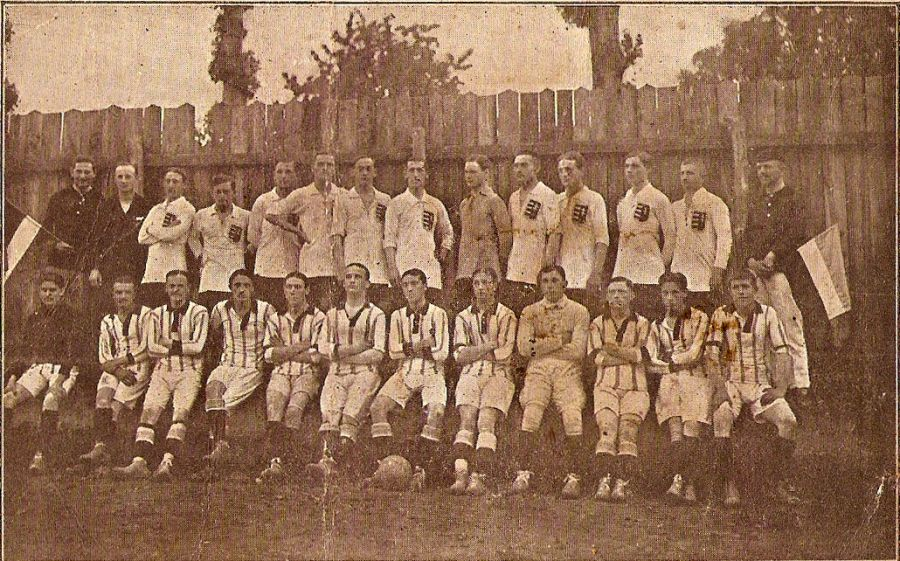
Temesvári Kinizsi and Tatabányai SC in 1914

Kinizsi entered the Hungarian league system in 1911, playing in the Southern division of the territorial championship. They went triumphant three times, having won the title in 1914, 1917 and 1918.

Following the World War I the city became the part of the Kingdom of Romania and the club was renamed to Chinezul Timișoara, which is the Romanian equivalent of the former name of the team (Pál Kinizsi is known as Pavel Chinezul in Romanian).

The team's colours were white and violet and it played at the Banatul Stadium which was opened on October 13, 1913. Nowadays this stadium, which can hold a crowd of 7,000 people, is being used by the Liga VI team, CFR Timișoara.

In Romania Chinezul Timișoara is most famous for its record 6 consecutive national title wins between the 1921–22 and 1926–27 seasons. This record has only been matched 71 years later by Steaua București.

Despite its success the club entered a financial crisis in the autumn of 1927, which was further aggravated when president Dr. Cornel Lazăr decided to leave the club. Lazăr went on to found Ripensia Timișoara football club. The club never fully recovered from this crisis and in August 1936 Chinezul Timișoara merged with another local club ILSA Timișoara and in 1939 made its last appearance in Romania's top flight of football, Liga I.

After World War II another merger followed, this time with CAM Timișoara. For a brief period the new club was named Chinezul CAM Timișoara and from 1946 it was named simply CAM Timișoara. This last merger was also synonymous with its official disappearance from Romanian football.

== Honours ==
Divizia A

- Winners (6): 1921–22, 1922–23, 1923–24, 1924–25, 1925–26, 1926–27

== Former managers ==
- Jenő Konrád

== League history ==
Season	Tier	Division	Place	Notes
1941–46	—	—	—	Merged with CAM; dissolved in 1946
1940–41	2	Divizia B (Series I)	5th	
1939–40	2	Divizia B (Series II)	4th	
1938–39	1	Divizia A	10th	Relegated
1937–38	1	Divizia A (Group I)	4th	
1936–37	1	Divizia A	10th	Merged with ILSA
1935–36	1	Divizia A	9th	
1934–35	1	Divizia A	5th	
1933–34	1	Divizia A (Group I)	6th	Won play-off
1932–33	2	West League	1st (C)	Promoted
1931–32	2	Banat Regional Championship	5th	
1930–31	2	Banat Regional Championship	7th	
1929–30	2	Timișoara Regional Championship	2nd	
1928–29	2	Timișoara Regional Championship	3rd	
1927–28	1	Divizia A	Quarter-finals	Timișoara champions
1926–27	1	Divizia A	1st (C)	Champions
1925–26	1	Divizia A	1st (C)	Champions
1924–25	1	Divizia A	1st (C)	Champions
1923–24	1	Divizia A	1st (C)	Champions
1922–23	1	Divizia A	1st (C)	Champions
1921–22	1	Divizia A	1st (C)	Champions
1919–21	Regional	Timișoara Regional Championship	—	Renamed Chinezul
1918–19	Regional	Hungarian Southern Championship (Eastern Division)	2nd	As Temesvári Kinizsi
1917–18	Regional	Hungarian Southern Championship	1st (C)	As Temesvári Kinizsi
1916–17	Regional	Hungarian Southern Championship	1st (C)	As Temesvári Kinizsi
1914–16	Regional	Hungarian wartime competitions	—	As Temesvári Kinizsi
1913–14	Regional	Hungarian Southern Championship	1st (C)	As Temesvári Kinizsi
1911–13	Regional	Hungarian Southern Championship	—	As Temesvári Kinizsi
1910–11	—	—	—	Founded in 1910

Champions
Runners-up
Third place
Relegated
