= 1935–36 Divizia B =

Divizia B
- Season: 1935–36
- Champions: ILSA Timișoara
- Promoted: None
- Relegated: CA Cluj; Societatea Gimnastică Sibiu; Prahova Ploiești; Tricolor Baia Mare; CA Timişoara; Patria Diciosânmartin; CFR Oradea; Elpis Constanța; UD Reşiţa; CFR Cluj; Brașovia Brașov; Stadiul Bacăoan Bacău; Societatea Sportivă Sibiu

The 1935–36 Divizia B was the second season of the second tier of the Romanian football league system.

The champions of each of the five series qualified to a play-off round. The winner of this play-off played against the last placed team in the 1935–36 Divizia A.

ILSA Timișoara won the play-off, but they lost the promotion to Universitatea Cluj.

== Team changes ==
CA Arad, Ceramica Bistriţa, Vitrometan Mediaş and Unirea CFR Paşcani were replaced by Craiovan Craiova, Victoria Carei, IAR Brașov and Dragoș Vodă Cernăuți.

== League standings ==
=== Seria I ===
Pos	Team	Pld	W	D	L	GF	GA	GD	Pts
1	Victoria Constanța	14	9	4	1	31	16	+15	22
2	CFR Brașov	14	8	1	5	33	13	+20	17
3	Maccabi București	14	8	1	5	29	25	+4	17
4	Sportul Studențesc	14	7	2	5	23	18	+5	16
5	Tricolor Ploiești	14	5	4	5	19	22	−3	14
6	Prahova Ploiești	14	4	5	5	21	28	−7	13
7	Elpis Constanța	14	3	1	10	18	34	−16	7
8	Brașovia Brașov	14	2	2	10	9	27	−18	6

=== Seria II ===
Pos	Team	Pld	W	D	L	GF	GA	GD	Pts
1	ILSA Timișoara	14	7	5	2	35	19	+16	19
2	Rovine Griviţa Craiova	14	6	5	3	26	29	−3	17
3	Jiul Petroşani	14	7	2	5	19	17	+2	16
4	Vulturii Textila Lugoj	14	5	5	4	28	24	+4	15
5	RGM Timişoara	14	5	2	7	20	23	−3	12
6	Craiovan Craiova	14	5	2	7	17	24	−7	12
7	CA Timişoara	14	5	1	8	27	35	−8	11
8	UD Reşiţa	14	4	2	8	21	22	−1	10

=== Seria III ===
Pos	Team	Pld	W	D	L	GF	GA	GD	Pts
1	Phoenix Baia Mare	14	11	3	0	47	14	+33	25
2	Olimpia CFR Satu Mare	14	8	3	3	36	16	+20	19
3	Victoria Carei	14	7	2	5	25	33	−8	16
4	Stăruința Oradea	14	6	3	5	23	21	+2	15
5	CA Cluj	14	5	2	7	21	28	−7	12
6	Tricolor Baia Mare	14	4	2	8	20	31	−11	10
7	CFR Oradea	14	3	2	9	17	29	−12	8
8	CFR Cluj	14	3	1	10	11	28	−17	7

=== Seria IV ===
Pos	Team	Pld	W	D	L	GF	GA	GD	Pts
1	IAR Brașov	14	9	2	3	28	16	+12	20
2	Șoimii Sibiu	14	9	0	5	33	22	+11	18
3	Unirea MV Alba Iulia	14	8	2	4	27	24	+3	18
4	CFR Simeria	14	7	2	5	36	23	+13	16
5	Mureşul Târgu Mureş	14	7	2	5	33	23	+10	16
6	Societatea Gimnastică Sibiu	14	6	1	7	33	30	+3	13
7	Patria Diciosânmartin	14	4	1	9	15	31	−16	9
8	Societatea Sportivă Sibiu	14	0	2	12	8	44	−36	2

=== Seria V ===
Pos	Team	Pld	W	D	L	GF	GA	GD	Pts
1	Franco-Româna Brăila	14	10	1	3	53	15	+38	21
2	Dacia Unirea IG Brăila	14	8	3	3	37	9	+28	19
3	Jahn Cernăuți	14	8	2	4	25	30	−5	18
4	Dacia Vasile Alecsandri Galați	14	8	1	5	33	23	+10	17
5	Dragoș Vodă Cernăuți	14	6	3	5	35	21	+14	15
6	Textila Moldova Iași	14	4	1	9	21	31	−10	9
7	Sporting Chişinău	14	3	1	10	18	44	−26	7
8	Stadiul Bacăoan Bacău	14	2	2	10	17	66	−49	6

== League play-off ==
Pos	Team	Pld	W	D	L	GF	GA	GD	Pts
1	ILSA Timișoara	8	6	0	2	23	15	+8	12
2	Phoenix Baia Mare	8	5	1	2	30	17	+13	11
3	Franco-Româna Brăila	8	4	0	4	15	25	−10	8
4	Victoria Constanța	8	3	0	5	11	17	−6	6
5	IAR Brașov	8	1	1	6	11	16	−5	3

== Promotion / relegation play-off ==
Team 1	Agg.	Team 2	1st leg	2nd leg
Universitatea Cluj	5–1	ILSA Timișoara	4–1	1–0

== See also ==
- 1935–36 Divizia A
