= 1946–47 Divizia C =

Third tier Romanian football league

Divizia C
- Season: 1946–47

The 1946–47 Divizia C was the third season of Liga III, the third tier of the Romanian football league system, and the first held after World War II. The championship featured twelve geographic regional series, with Series V divided into two groups.

== League tables ==
=== Seria I ===
Pos	Team	Pld	W	D	L	GF	GA	GD	Pts	Qualification or relegation
1	Concordia Ploiești (C, P)	18	13	4	1	77	18	+59	30	Promotion to Divizia B
2	CFR Târgoviște (P)	18	14	2	2	44	16	+28	30	Promotion to Divizia B
3	TC Astra Târgoviște	18	11	3	4	38	18	+20	25	
4	23 August București (P)	18	12	1	5	71	34	+37	25	Promotion to Divizia B
5	Româno-Americană Ploiești	18	9	3	6	56	28	+28	21	
6	PAS Pucioasa	18	7	2	9	35	53	−18	16	
7	PTT București	18	7	1	10	37	53	−16	15	
8	Arte Grafice București	18	4	0	14	29	74	−45	8	
9	UC București	18	2	2	14	11	60	−49	6	
10	Principesa Ileana Câmpina	18	2	0	16	17	64	−47	4	

Source: romaniansoccer.ro
Rules for classification: 1) Points; 2) Goal difference; 3) Number of goals scored.
(C) Champions; (P) Promoted

=== Seria II ===
Pos	Team	Pld	W	D	L	GF	GA	GD	Pts	Qualification or relegation
1	BNR București (C, P)	18	12	3	3	54	26	+28	27	Promotion to Divizia B
2	Filatura Română București	18	12	2	4	73	21	+52	26	
3	Oțelul Turnu Măgurele	18	10	2	6	58	37	+21	22	
4	ASIMB Alexandria	18	10	1	7	38	32	+6	21	
5	Laromet București	18	8	3	7	50	31	+19	19	
6	Telefoane București	18	7	4	7	35	41	−6	18	
7	CFR Ploiești	18	7	1	10	31	33	−2	15	
8	Colentina București	18	4	6	8	23	64	−41	14	
9	Acvila Giurgiu	18	4	5	9	29	46	−17	13	
10	Dragaje Giurgiu	18	1	3	14	12	72	−60	5	

Source: romaniansoccer.ro
Rules for classification: 1) Points; 2) Goal difference; 3) Number of goals scored.
(C) Champions; (P) Promoted

=== Seria III ===
Pos	Team	Pld	W	D	L	GF	GA	GD	Pts	Qualification or relegation
1	Astra Română Poiana Câmpina (C, P)	18	14	1	3	73	22	+51	29	Promotion to Divizia B
2	Voina București	18	11	0	7	51	30	+21	22	
3	Elpis Constanța	18	10	2	6	32	32	0	22	
4	Gloria Valea Călugărească	18	9	1	8	29	32	−3	19	
5	Tipografia CFR București	18	9	1	8	38	31	+7	19	
6	Venus Călărași	18	9	1	8	34	36	−2	19	
7	Steaua Română Câmpina	18	9	1	8	46	32	+14	19	
8	Adesgo București	18	6	1	11	31	53	−22	13	
9	Medicina București	18	5	1	12	31	53	−22	11	
10	Monetăria București	18	2	3	13	23	67	−44	7	

Source: romaniansoccer.ro
Rules for classification: 1) Points; 2) Goal difference; 3) Number of goals scored.
(C) Champions; (P) Promoted

=== Seria IV ===
Pos	Team	Pld	W	D	L	GF	GA	GD	Pts	Qualification or relegation
1	PCA Constanța (C, P)	20	16	2	2	74	19	+55	34	Promotion to Divizia B
2	Metalosport Galați	20	16	1	3	54	19	+35	33	
3	Franco-Româna Brăila (P)	20	16	0	4	65	22	+43	32	Promotion to Divizia B
4	Dacia Unirea Brăila	20	14	1	5	65	25	+40	29	
5	CFR Brăila	20	10	1	9	34	35	−1	21	
6	Avântul ICAR Buzău	20	9	3	8	39	36	+3	21	
7	ȘN Galați	20	7	3	10	31	48	−17	17	
8	CFR Râmnicu Sărat	20	5	1	14	28	55	−27	11	
9	Arsenal Galați	20	5	1	14	31	68	−37	11	
10	Gloria Vrancea Focșani	20	3	2	15	16	53	−37	8	
11	1 Mai Focșani	20	1	1	18	5	62	−57	3	

Source: romaniansoccer.ro
Rules for classification: 1) Points; 2) Goal difference; 3) Number of goals scored.
(C) Champions; (P) Promoted

=== Seria V (A) ===
Pos	Team	Pld	W	D	L	GF	GA	GD	Pts	Qualification or relegation
1	Indagrara Arad (C, P)	22	19	2	1	75	23	+52	40	Promotion to Divizia B
2	Unirea Jimbolia	22	14	3	5	61	35	+26	31	
3	Metalosport Ferdinand (P)	22	10	7	5	49	32	+17	27	Promotion to Divizia B
4	Romitex Timișoara	22	9	8	5	42	47	−5	26	
5	Prima Banat Timișoara	22	8	9	5	34	27	+7	25	
6	Bohn Jimbolia	22	8	7	7	58	42	+16	23	
7	Bocșa Montană	22	10	2	10	54	44	+10	22	
8	Freidorf Timișoara	22	6	7	9	38	55	−17	19	
9	Teba Arad	22	6	7	9	27	45	−18	19	
10	Metalul Bocșa Română	22	7	3	12	40	52	−12	17	
11	Progresul Lugoj	22	2	6	14	26	69	−43	10	
12	CFR Caransebeș	22	1	3	18	10	51	−41	5	

Source: romaniansoccer.ro
Rules for classification: 1) Points; 2) Goal difference; 3) Number of goals scored.
(C) Champions; (P) Promoted

=== Seria V (B) ===
Pos	Team	Pld	W	D	L	GF	GA	GD	Pts	Qualification or relegation
1	Ripensia Timișoara (C, P)	18	13	4	1	48	21	+27	30	Promotion to Divizia B
2	ILSA Timișoara	18	14	1	3	46	21	+25	29	
3	Astra Arad	18	10	3	5	44	23	+21	23	
4	SG Arad	18	8	4	6	40	32	+8	20	
5	Vinga	18	7	4	7	24	23	+1	18	
6	Olimpia Arad	18	6	4	8	20	32	−12	16	
7	Virtutea Pecica	18	6	1	11	26	33	−7	13	
8	Patria Chișineu-Criș	18	5	3	10	26	33	−7	13	
9	Șoimii Lipova	18	5	3	10	26	43	−17	13	
10	Tricolor Arad	18	2	1	15	16	55	−39	5	

Source: romaniansoccer.ro
Rules for classification: 1) Points; 2) Goal difference; 3) Number of goals scored.
(C) Champions; (P) Promoted

=== Seria VI ===
Pos	Team	Pld	W	D	L	GF	GA	GD	Pts	Qualification or relegation
1	Sanitas Satu Mare (C, P)	18	12	6	0	74	18	+56	30	Promotion to Divizia B
2	Minaur Baia Mare (P)	18	12	3	3	54	33	+21	27	Promotion to Divizia B
3	Tisa Sighet (P)	18	9	2	7	44	45	−1	20	Promotion to Divizia B
4	Carmen Oradea	18	8	4	6	38	38	0	20	
5	Olimpia CFR Satu Mare	18	7	5	6	44	30	+14	19	
6	Victoria CFR Carei	18	7	2	9	23	32	−9	16	
7	Stăruința Oradea	18	6	4	8	40	37	+3	16	
8	Electrica Valea lui Mihai	18	5	4	9	33	37	−4	14	
9	Zalău	18	4	2	12	27	59	−32	10	
10	CSM Salonta	18	3	2	13	21	69	−48	8	

Source: romaniansoccer.ro
Rules for classification: 1) Points; 2) Goal difference; 3) Number of goals scored.
(C) Champions; (P) Promoted

=== Seria VII ===
Pos	Team	Pld	W	D	L	GF	GA	GD	Pts	Qualification or relegation
1	CFR Cluj (C, P)	16	15	1	0	56	5	+51	31	Promotion to Divizia B
2	Haggibor Cluj	16	11	1	4	35	17	+18	23	
3	Sparta Gherla	16	9	1	6	38	29	+9	19	
4	Sonametan Turda	16	8	2	6	37	30	+7	18	
5	Cimentul Turda	16	7	3	6	28	25	+3	17	
6	Rutextil Cluj	16	6	1	9	39	40	−1	13	
7	CS Bistrița	16	5	2	9	21	23	−2	12	
8	Unirea Luduș	16	3	2	11	18	33	−15	8	
9	Minerul Ticu Aghireș	16	1	1	14	11	81	−70	3	

Source: romaniansoccer.ro
Rules for classification: 1) Points; 2) Goal difference; 3) Number of goals scored.
(C) Champions; (P) Promoted

=== Seria VIII ===
Pos	Team	Pld	W	D	L	GF	GA	GD	Pts	Qualification or relegation
1	Șoimii Sibiu (C, P)	18	14	1	3	60	20	+40	29	Promotion to Divizia B
2	IRTL Mediaș	18	13	1	4	49	25	+24	27	
3	Sticla Târnăveni (P)	18	9	4	5	46	31	+15	22	Promotion to Divizia B
4	Victoria Sighișoara	18	10	1	7	42	29	+13	21	
5	SM Odorhei	18	7	3	8	29	36	−7	17	
6	Sportul CFR Sibiu	18	6	3	9	34	42	−8	15	
7	ACFR Sighișoara	18	6	3	9	26	45	−19	15	
8	Vitrometan Mediaș	18	7	0	11	33	37	−4	14	
9	Unirea Mihai Viteazul Alba Iulia	18	6	1	11	27	45	−18	13	
10	Nitro Mica Târnăveni	18	2	3	13	16	52	−36	7	

Source: romaniansoccer.ro
Rules for classification: 1) Points; 2) Goal difference; 3) Number of goals scored.
(C) Champions; (P) Promoted

=== Seria IX ===
Pos	Team	Pld	W	D	L	GF	GA	GD	Pts	Qualification or relegation
1	Doljul Craiova (C, P)	18	15	1	2	62	16	+46	31	Promotion to Divizia B
2	Sporting Roșiori	18	12	1	5	42	36	+6	25	
3	Oltenia Craiova	18	11	1	6	39	30	+9	23	
4	Vâlceana Râmnicu Vâlcea	18	10	1	7	49	27	+22	21	
5	CFR Pitești	18	8	1	9	32	34	−2	17	
6	SM Găvana	18	7	3	8	42	36	+6	17	
7	Gorjul Târgu Jiu	18	8	0	10	29	52	−23	16	
8	Oltul Slatina	18	6	2	10	36	30	+6	14	
9	Zborul Cloșani	18	4	3	11	28	53	−25	11	
10	Generala Caracal	18	2	1	15	23	68	−45	5	

Source: romaniansoccer.ro
Rules for classification: 1) Points; 2) Goal difference; 3) Number of goals scored.
(C) Champions; (P) Promoted

=== Seria X ===
Pos	Team	Pld	W	D	L	GF	GA	GD	Pts	Qualification or relegation
1	Aninoasa (C, P)	18	16	0	2	66	12	+54	32	Promotion to Divizia B
2	Lonea	18	14	2	2	49	16	+33	30	
3	Victoria CFR Petroșani	18	13	1	4	36	15	+21	27	
4	Vâscoza Română Lupeni	18	12	0	6	42	16	+26	24	
5	UF Hunedoara (P)	18	11	1	6	42	16	+26	23	Promotion to Divizia B
6	Metalosport Călan	18	7	2	9	24	32	−8	16	
7	Grănicerul Caransebeș	18	5	2	11	22	53	−31	12	
8	UM Cugir	18	4	1	13	14	39	−25	9	
9	Corvinul Deva	18	2	1	15	10	55	−45	5	
10	CFR Simeria	18	1	0	17	5	56	−51	2	

Source: romaniansoccer.ro
Rules for classification: 1) Points; 2) Goal difference; 3) Number of goals scored.
(C) Champions; (P) Promoted

=== Seria XI ===
Pos	Team	Pld	W	D	L	GF	GA	GD	Pts	Qualification or relegation
1	Danubiana Roman (C, P)	18	15	2	1	93	9	+84	32	Promotion to Divizia B
2	Victoria CFR Iași (P)	18	16	0	2	73	9	+64	32	Promotion to Divizia B
3	ARLUS Bacău (P)	18	14	0	4	81	19	+62	28	Promotion to Divizia B
4	ACFR Iași	18	11	2	5	46	28	+18	24	
5	Hârtia Letea	18	11	0	7	45	46	−1	22	
6	Hagwiruch Rădăuți	18	5	2	11	23	53	−30	12	
7	HLA Rădăuți	18	5	1	12	21	58	−37	11	
8	Macabi Iași	18	3	2	13	13	58	−45	8	
9	Unirea CFR Pașcani	18	2	2	14	12	74	−62	6	
10	CFR Ițcani	18	1	3	14	15	68	−53	5	

Source: romaniansoccer.ro
Rules for classification: 1) Points; 2) Goal difference; 3) Number of goals scored.
(C) Champions; (P) Promoted

=== Seria XII ===
Pos	Team	Pld	W	D	L	GF	GA	GD	Pts	Qualification or relegation
1	Astra Română Moreni (C, P)	18	16	2	0	80	17	+63	34	Promotion to Divizia B
2	Uzinele Codlea	18	11	2	5	38	18	+20	24	
3	UA Brașov	18	8	5	5	33	36	−3	21	
4	Concordia Gura Ocniței	18	9	1	8	35	32	+3	19	
5	Explosivii Făgăraș (P)	18	8	2	8	37	39	−2	18	Promotion to Divizia B
6	CFR Brașov (P)	18	6	3	9	24	25	−1	15	Promotion to Divizia B
7	Textila Prejmer	18	6	2	10	25	36	−11	14	
8	Costinescu Sinaia	18	6	0	12	24	47	−23	12	
9	Caraimanul Bușteni	18	5	2	11	23	44	−21	12	
10	Malaxa Tohan	18	4	3	11	33	58	−25	11	

Source: romaniansoccer.ro
Rules for classification: 1) Points; 2) Goal difference; 3) Number of goals scored.
(C) Champions; (P) Promoted

== See also ==
- 1946–47 Divizia A
- 1946–47 Divizia B
