= 1947–48 Divizia B =

Divizia B
- Season: 1947–48
- Promoted: Metalochimic București; Politehnica Timișoara
- Relegated: Stăruința Satu Mare; Electrica Timișoara; BNR București; CFR Târgoviște; Ripensia Timișoara; Sticla Târnăveni; CFR Caracal; Textila Buhuși; CFR Arad; CFR Simeria; CFR Buzău; CFR Iași; UF Hunedoara; Minaur Baia Mare; Craiova; Danubiana Roman; Indagrara Arad; CFR Turda; CFR Brașov; Tractorul Brașov; Locomotiva Reșița; Explosivii Făgăraș; CFR Craiova; Astra Română Poiana; Metalosport Ferdinand; Tisa Sighet; PCA Constanța; Franco-Româna Brăila; Lugoj; CFR Târgu Mureș; Venus București; ST București; Gloria Arad; Doljul Craiova; Dinamo Suceava; Sparta Arad; CFR Cluj; Aninoasa

The 1947–48 Divizia B was the ninth season of the second tier of the Romanian football league system.

The format was changed from three series to four series, each one of them having 16 teams. The winners of the series were supposed to promote in the Divizia A, but finally only two of them promoted. Next season (1948–49) the format would be changed again, this time in two series of 14 teams, therefore in this season relegated all the teams ranked below the 7th place, a total of 36 teams (9x4) plus the worst two ranked on the 7th place.

== Team changes ==
=== To Divizia B ===
Promoted from Divizia C

- Concordia Ploiești
- BNR București
- Astra Română Poiana Câmpina
- PCA Constanța
- Indagrara Arad
- Ripensia Timișoara
- Sanitas Satu Mare
- CFR Cluj
- Șoimii Sibiu
- Doljul Craiova
- Aninoasa
- Danubiana Roman
- Astra Română Moreni
- CFR Târgoviște
- Minaur Baia Mare
- Franco-Româna Brăila
- Metalosport Ferdinand
- Tisa Sighet
- Sticla Târnăveni
- ARLUS Bacău
- 23 August București
- CFR Iași
- UF Hunedoara
- Explosivii Făgăraș
- CFR Brașov

Relegated from Divizia A

- Prahova Ploiești
- Craiova

=== From Divizia B ===
Relegated to Divizia C

- Sparta București
- Feroemail Ploiești

Promoted to Divizia A

- Unirea Tricolor București
- Ploiești
- Dermata Cluj
- Karres Mediaș

=== Enrolled teams ===
CFR Buzău and Dinamo Suceava were enrolled directly in the second division.

=== Excluded teams ===
Victoria Cluj was dissolved at the end of the previous season and was excluded from Divizia B.

=== Renamed teams ===
23 August București was renamed as Metalochimic București.

IAR Brașov was renamed as Tractorul Brașov.

23 August Lugoj was renamed as CSM Lugoj.

=== Other teams ===
Șoimii Sibiu merged with Sportul CFR Sibiu and the team was renamed as Șoimii CFR Sibiu.

Prahova Ploiești and Concordia Ploiești merged, the second one being absorbed by the first one, but Prahova changed its name in Concordia Ploiești, the name of the factory that became the main sponsor of the team.

Sanitas Satu Mare and Olimpia CFR Satu Mare merged, Sanitas being absorbed by Olimpia which was also renamed simply as CFR Satu Mare.

== League tables ==
=== Serie I ===
Pos	Team	Pld	W	D	L	GF	GA	GD	Pts	Promotion or relegation
1	Dezrobirea Constanța (C)	30	19	9	2	74	23	+51	47	Promotion to Divizia A
2	Șoimii CFR Sibiu	30	20	4	6	83	30	+53	44	
3	Socec Lafayette București	30	19	3	8	77	44	+33	41	
4	Grivița CFR București	30	16	4	10	81	41	+40	36	
5	Sporting Pitești	30	16	0	14	67	49	+18	32	
6	Arsenal Sibiu	30	13	5	12	64	43	+21	31	
7	FC Călărași	30	13	5	12	52	53	−1	31	
8	BNR București (R)	30	12	6	12	52	52	0	30	Relegation to Divizia C
9	CFR Caracal (R)	30	12	5	13	54	46	+8	29	Relegation to Divizia C
10	CFR Buzău (R)	30	11	6	13	49	64	−15	28	Relegation to Divizia C
11	Craiova (R)	30	10	7	13	52	63	−11	27	Relegation to Divizia C
12	CFR Brașov (R)	30	11	5	14	44	57	−13	27	Relegation to Divizia C
13	CFR Craiova (R)	30	11	3	16	51	73	−22	25	Relegation to Divizia C
14	PCA Constanța (R)	30	8	9	13	33	53	−20	25	Relegation to Divizia C
15	Venus București (R)	30	8	3	19	44	102	−58	19	Relegation to Divizia C
16	Doljul Craiova (R)	30	2	4	24	27	111	−84	8	Relegation to Divizia C

Source: romaniansoccer.ro
Rules for classification: 1) Points 2) Head-to-head points; 3) Head-to-head goal difference; 4) Head-to-head goals scored; 5) Head-to-head away goals scored; 6) Goal difference; 7) Goals scored.
(C) Champions; (R) Relegated

=== Serie II ===
Pos	Team	Pld	W	D	L	GF	GA	GD	Pts	Promotion or relegation
1	Metalochimic București (C, P)	30	17	6	7	75	44	+31	40	Promotion to Divizia A
2	Concordia Ploiești	30	18	4	8	81	49	+32	40	
3	Textila Sfântu Gheorghe	30	17	5	8	82	43	+39	39	
4	Astra Română Moreni	30	16	5	9	72	51	+21	37	
5	Politehnica Iași	30	16	4	10	49	34	+15	36	
6	ARLUS Bacău	30	12	11	7	47	38	+9	35	
7	Gloria CFR Galați	30	14	6	10	69	49	+20	34	
8	CFR Târgoviște (R)	30	13	8	9	46	42	+4	34	Relegation to Divizia C
9	Textila Buhuși (R)	30	13	7	10	62	47	+15	33	Relegation to Divizia C
10	CFR Iași (R)	30	14	4	12	44	42	+2	32	Relegation to Divizia C
11	Danubiana Roman (R)	30	9	6	15	56	76	−20	24	Relegation to Divizia C
12	Tractorul Brașov (R)	30	7	9	14	39	63	−24	23	Relegation to Divizia C
13	Astra Română Poiana Câmpina (R)	30	9	4	17	39	69	−30	22	Relegation to Divizia C
14	Franco-Româna Brăila (R)	30	6	9	15	41	74	−33	21	Relegation to Divizia C
15	ST București (R)	30	5	6	19	33	78	−45	16	Relegation to Divizia C
16	Dinamo Suceava (R)	30	4	6	20	29	65	−36	14	Relegation to Divizia C

Source: romaniansoccer.ro
Rules for classification: 1) Points 2) Head-to-head points; 3) Head-to-head goal difference; 4) Head-to-head goals scored; 5) Head-to-head away goals scored; 6) Goal difference; 7) Goals scored.
(C) Champions; (P) Promoted; (R) Relegated

=== Serie III ===
Pos	Team	Pld	W	D	L	GF	GA	GD	Pts	Promotion or relegation
1	Politehnica Timișoara (C, P)	29	22	2	5	71	22	+49	46	Promotion to Divizia A
2	CAM Timișoara	29	16	6	7	58	44	+14	38	
3	Mica Brad	29	16	4	9	50	30	+20	36	
4	CFR Turnu Severin	29	16	2	11	58	32	+26	34	
5	CFR Arad	29	15	2	12	55	48	+7	32	
6	Minerul Lupeni	29	12	6	11	53	40	+13	30	
7	Electrica Timișoara (R)	29	12	5	12	43	44	−1	29	Relegation to Divizia C
8	Ripensia Timișoara (R)	29	12	4	13	44	54	−10	28	Relegation to Divizia C
9	AMEF Arad (R)	29	10	7	12	56	46	+10	27	Relegation to Divizia C
10	UF Hunedoara (R)	29	13	0	16	49	59	−10	26	Relegation to Divizia C
11	Indagrara Arad (R)	29	11	4	14	42	44	−2	26	Relegation to Divizia C
12	Locomotiva Reșița (R)	29	8	6	15	45	51	−6	22	Relegation to Divizia C
13	Metalosport Ferdinand (R)	29	8	4	17	31	56	−25	20	Relegation to Divizia C
14	Lugoj (R)	29	5	8	16	35	97	−62	18	Relegation to Divizia C
15	Gloria Arad (R)	29	6	3	20	30	71	−41	15	Relegation to Divizia C
16	Sparta Arad (E)	15	9	5	1	43	25	+18	23	Club dissolved

Source: romaniansoccer.ro
Rules for classification: 1) Points 2) Head-to-head points; 3) Head-to-head goal difference; 4) Head-to-head goals scored; 5) Head-to-head away goals scored; 6) Goal difference; 7) Goals scored.
(C) Champions; (E) Eliminated; (P) Promoted; (R) Relegated

=== Serie IV ===
Pos	Team	Pld	W	D	L	GF	GA	GD	Pts	Promotion or relegation
1	Phoenix Baia Mare (C)	28	19	4	5	64	32	+32	42	Promotion to Divizia A
2	Industria Sârmei Câmpia Turzii	28	16	3	9	56	34	+22	35	
3	Crișana CFR Oradea	28	15	3	10	55	41	+14	33	
4	Solvay Uioara	28	12	7	9	54	52	+2	31	
5	CFR Satu Mare	28	12	6	10	56	41	+15	30	
6	Șurianu Sebeș	28	13	4	11	50	44	+6	30	
7	Stăruința Satu Mare (R)	28	12	6	10	55	45	+10	30	Relegation to Divizia C
8	Sticla Târnăveni (R)	28	13	4	11	47	47	0	30	Relegation to Divizia C
9	CFR Simeria (R)	28	12	4	12	59	55	+4	28	Relegation to Divizia C
10	Minaur Baia Mare (R)	28	10	4	14	44	61	−17	24	Relegation to Divizia C
11	CFR Turda (R)	28	8	6	14	59	59	0	22	Relegation to Divizia C
12	Explosivi Făgăraș (R)	28	8	5	15	51	73	−22	21	Relegation to Divizia C
13	Tisa Sighet (R)	28	7	4	17	43	89	−46	18	Relegation to Divizia C
14	CFR Târgu Mureș (R)	28	6	4	18	39	74	−35	16	Relegation to Divizia C
15	CFR Cluj (E)	15	10	0	5	40	28	+12	20	Clubs dissolved
16	Aninoasa (E)	15	4	4	7	27	24	+3	12	Clubs dissolved

Source: romaniansoccer.ro
Rules for classification: 1) Points 2) Head-to-head points; 3) Head-to-head goal difference; 4) Head-to-head goals scored; 5) Head-to-head away goals scored; 6) Goal difference; 7) Goals scored.
(C) Champions; (E) Eliminated; (R) Relegated

== See also ==
- 1947–48 Divizia A
