= 1937–38 Cupa României =

Tournament details
- Country: Romania

Final positions
- Champions: Rapid București (3rd title)
- Runners-up: CAM Timișoara

Tournament statistics
- Matches played: 32
- Goals scored: 142 (4.44 per match)

The 1937–38 Cupa României was the fifth edition of Romania's most prestigious football cup competition.

The title was won by Rapid București, after they scored 3 goals in a final against CAM Timișoara.

== Format ==
The competition is an annual knockout tournament with pairings for each round drawn at random.

There are no seeds for the draw. The draw also determines which teams will play at home. Each tie is played as a single leg.

If a match is drawn after 90 minutes, the game goes in extra time, and if the scored is still tight after 120 minutes, there a replay will be played, usually at the ground of the team who were away for the first game.

From the first edition, the teams from Divizia A entered in competition in sixteen finals, rule which remained till today.

The format is quite similar to the oldest recognised football tournament in the world, the FA Cup.

== Bracket ==
Round of 32
Chinezul Timișoara	2
Adesgo București	0
Franco-Româna Brăila	3
Gloria Arad	1
AMEF Arad	0
Rapid București	2
Telefon Club București	2
UD Reșița	1
Tricolor Ploiești	1
Venus București	4
Juventus București	5
Ripensia Timișoara	1
Unirea Tricolor București	3
Crișana Oradea	0
Victoria Carei	4
Vulturii Textila Lugoj	2
CAM Timișoara	6
Dacia Unirea Brăila	1
Phoenix Baia Mare	4
Dragoş Vodă Cernăuţi	0
Universitatea Cluj	3
Sportul Studențesc (a.e.t.)	4
Victoria Constanța	4
Olimpia CFR Satu Mare	1
Mociornița București	1
CA Oradea	2
Aquila CFR Sighișoara	2
Victoria Cluj	6
Ceramica Bistrița	2
Jiul Petroșani	4
Mica Brad	2
AS CFR Brașov	1

Round of 16
Chinezul Timișoara	3
Franco-Româna Brăila	1
Rapid București	3
Telefon Club București	0
Venus București (a.e.t.)	3
Juventus București	1
Unirea Tricolor București	7
Victoria Carei	0
CAM Timișoara	2
Phoenix Baia Mare	1
Sportul Studențesc	4
Victoria Constanța	0
CA Oradea	1
Victoria Cluj	2
Jiul Petroșani	6
Mica Brad	0

Quarter-finals
Chinezul Timișoara	3
Rapid București	5
Venus București	5
Unirea Tricolor București	1
CAM Timișoara	1
Sportul Studențesc	0
Victoria Cluj	4
Jiul Petroșani	0

Semi-finals
Rapid București	4
Venus București	2
CAM Timișoara	2
Victoria Cluj	0

Final
Rapid București	3
CAM Timișoara	2

== First round proper ==
Team 1	Score	Team 2
14 November 1937
Phoenix Baia Mare (Div. A)	4–0	(Div. A) Dragoş Vodă Cernăuţi
Unirea Tricolor București (Div. A)	3–0	(Div. A) Crișana Oradea
AMEF Arad (Div. A)	0–2	(Div. A) Rapid București
Chinezul Timișoara (Div. A)	2–0	(District) Adesgo București
CAM Timișoara (Div. B)	6–1	(Div. A) Dacia Unirea Brăila
Juventus București (Div. A)	5–1	(Div. A) Ripensia Timișoara
Tricolor Ploiești (Div. B)	1–4	(Div. A) Venus București
Victoria Constanța (Div. B)	4–1	(Div. A) Olimpia CFR Satu Mare
Aquila CFR Sighișoara (Div. C)	2–6	(Div. A) Victoria Cluj
Franco-Româna Brăila (Div. B)	3–1	(Div. A) Gloria Arad
Ceramica Bistrița (Div. C)	2–4	(Div. A) Jiul Petroșani
Victoria Carei (Div. B)	4–2	(Div. A) Vulturii Textila Lugoj
Mociornița București (Div. C)	1–2	(Div. A) CA Oradea
Mica Brad (Div. C)	2–1	(Div. A) AS CFR Brașov
Telefon Club București (Div. B)	2–1	(Div. B) UD Reșița
Universitatea Cluj (Div. A)	3–4 (a.e.t.)	(Div. A) Sportul Studențesc București

== Second round proper ==
Team 1	Score	Team 2
25 March 1938
Unirea Tricolor București	7–0	Victoria Carei
26 March 1938
Rapid București	3–0	Telefon Club București
27 March 1938
Chinezul Timișoara	3–1	Franco-Româna Brăila
Venus București	3–1 (a.e.t.)	Juventus București
CA Oradea	1–2	Victoria Cluj
Jiul Petroșani	6–0	Mica Brad
Sportul Studențesc București	4–0	Victoria Constanța
Phoenix Baia Mare	1–1	CAM Timișoara
30 March 1938 — Replay
CAM Timișoara	2–1 (R)	Phoenix Baia Mare

== Quarter-finals ==
Team 1	Score	Team 2
1 May 1938
Chinezul Timișoara	3–5	Rapid București
CAM Timișoara	1–0	Sportul Studențesc București
Venus București	5–1	Unirea Tricolor București
Victoria Cluj	4–0	Jiul Petroșani

== Semi-finals ==
Team 1	Score	Team 2
15 May 1938
CAM Timișoara	2–0	Victoria Cluj
Rapid București	2–1†	Venus București
21 May 1938 — Replay
Rapid București	4–2 (R)	Venus București

Notes: † The match between Rapid București and Venus București was contested by both teams and it was replayed.

== Final ==
19 June 1938
17:30 EET

Rapid București	3–2	CAM Timișoara
Auer 9'; Cuedan 39'; Raffinski 80' (pen.)	Report	Gerber 8'; Reuter 70'

Giulești, Bucharest
Attendance: 7,000
Referee: Denis Xifando (Bucharest)

Cupa României 1937–38 winners

3rd title
