= Stadionul Orășenesc Cluj =

Multi-use stadium in Cluj-Napoca, Romania

- Interactive map of Stadionul Orășenesc Cluj
- Location: Cluj-Napoca, Romania
- Coordinates: 46°46′06.32″N 23°34′19.48″E
- Owner: Cluj-Napoca
- Capacity: 28,000
- Surface: Grass & track

Construction
- Built: 1908; 118 years ago
- Opened: 1911; 115 years ago
- Closed: 1960; 66 years ago
- Demolished: 1960; 66 years ago

Tenants
- Club Atletic Cluj (1911–1960), Academia Comercială Cluj (1911–1913, 1921–1926), CFR Cluj (1911–1960), Clubul Atletic Universitar Cluj (1911–1918, 1940–1945), U Cluj (1919–1940, 1945–1960), Victoria Cluj (1920–1960)

The first football and athletics stadium in what is now Cluj-Napoca was Stadionul Orășenesc Cluj, built between 1908 and 1911. It had wooden stands and had a capacity of 1,500 people. The official inauguration in 1911 was done by organizing a game between a Cluj XI and Galatasaray Istanbul. It was the first game in Europe for Galatasaray, and Cluj won 8–1.

== History ==
On 21 July 1908 the athlete from Cluj Ștefan Somodi won 2nd place at the London Olympics. Considering the fact that he trained in the school yards, the city officials of Cluj decided to build a sports center where high-level competitions for footballers and athletes could be organized, on a field in the City Park, south of Someș, on an empty field where Cluj Athletic Club trained.

The construction of the "City Stadium" began in 1908 under the direction of the city's chief engineer Gyula Kovács and ended in 1911. The stadium was inaugurated on 17 September 1911. At the opening ceremony, a number of famous personalities were present: in addition to the mayors and club leaders of Cluj, 21 sports associations were represented, representatives of the Ministry of Defense also spoke National and of the Minister of Public Education. On behalf of the city, Deputy Mayor Béla Fekete-Nagy handed over the sports complex to KAC President Baron Jósika Samu, after which the opening competitions of the track began. After the athletics competitions organized by Club Atletic Cluj, a Cluj team composed of players from Club Atletic Cluj and CS Feroviar Cluj played two friendly matches: in the inaugural match they beat Galatasaray Istanbul with a score of 8–1, but the team from Budapest - Csepeli - beat Cluj with 4–1, ("The Opposition", 1911, 18 September). In addition to the two mentioned above, the stadium was also the host of the club Academia Comercială and CA Universitar Cluj.

The first tribune of the city's stadium was built of wood and had a capacity of 1,500 seats, an extremely large number for those times. The changing rooms were arranged under it, as well as small rooms where the footballers could live.

From 1920, the clubs that played at the city stadium were CFR Cluj, CA Cluj, U Cluj and Victoria Cluj.

After almost 50 years since its construction, in 1960 the wooden tribune was moved to Câmpia Turzii, where it still is, at the ISCT Stadium.

== Gallery ==
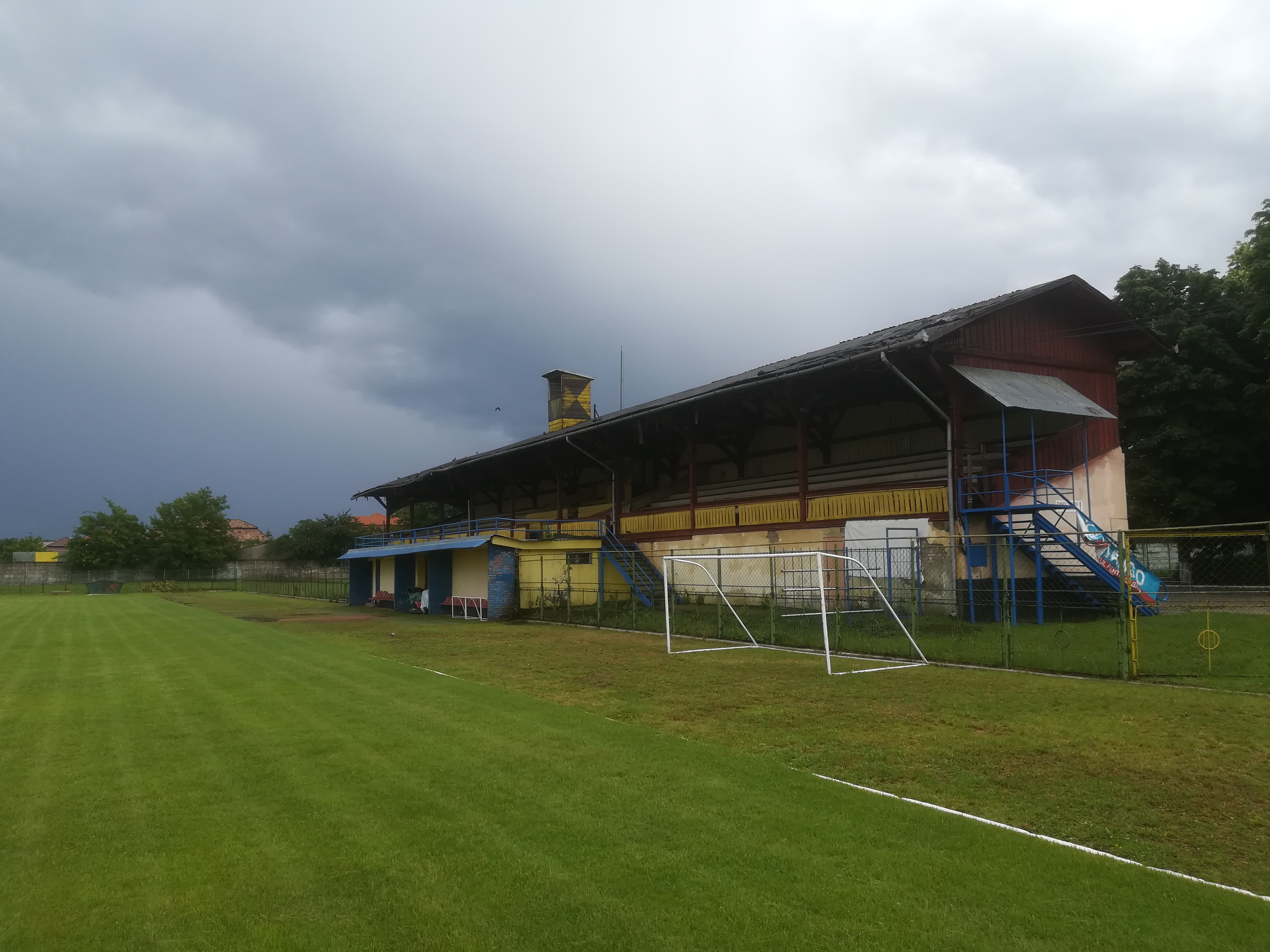
Inside view of the grandstand.

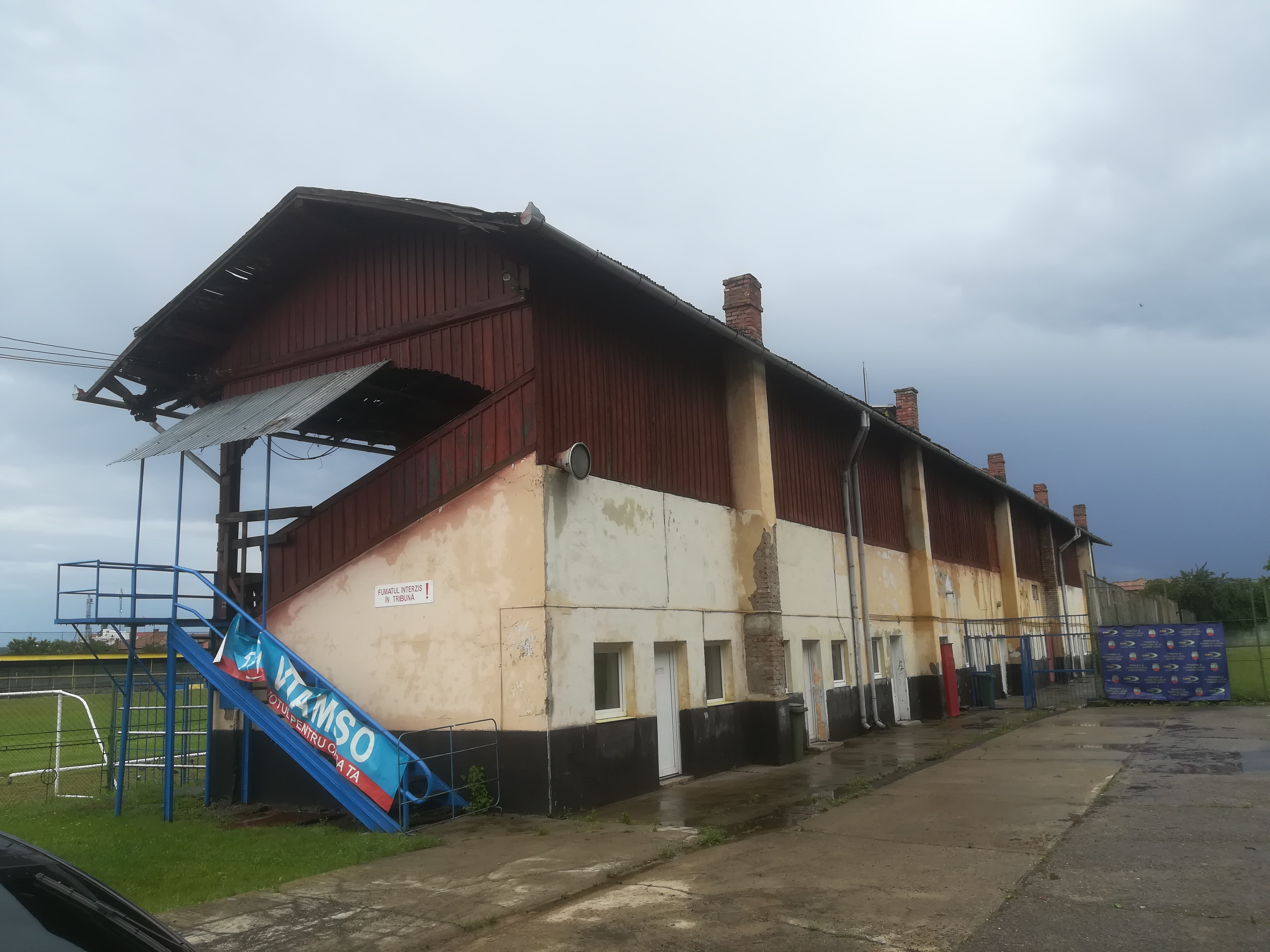
View from the outside of the grandstand.

== See also ==
- Stadionul Ion Moina
- Cluj Arena
- Dr. Constantin Rădulescu
- Stadionul CMC
- Stadionul Mihai Adam
