= 1938–39 Cupa României =

Tournament details
- Country: Romania

Final positions
- Champions: Rapid București
- Runners-up: Sportul Studențesc București

The 1938–39 Cupa României was the sixth edition of Romania's most prestigious football cup competition.

The title was won by Rapid București against Sportul Studențesc București.

== Format ==
The competition is an annual knockout tournament with pairings for each round drawn at random.

There are no seeds for the draw. The draw also determines which teams will play at home. Each tie is played as a single leg.

If a match is drawn after 90 minutes, the game goes in extra time, and if the scored is still tight after 120 minutes, there a replay will be played, usually at the ground of the team who were away for the first game.

From the first edition, the teams from Divizia A entered in competition in sixteen finals, rule which remained till today.

The format is quite similar to the oldest recognised football tournament in the world, the FA Cup.

== First round proper ==
Team 1	Score	Team 2
13 November 1938
AMEF Arad (Div. A)	6–0	(Div. A) Tricolor CF Ploiești
Franco-Româna Brăila (Div. B)	4–0	(Div. B) Stăruința Oradea
Oltul Sfântu Gheorghe (District)	2–0	(District) Astra Română Moreni
Prahova Ploiești (Div. B)	1–0	(District) CFR Turnu Severin
Unirea Tricolor București (Div. B)	9–1	(Div. B) Mihai Viteazul Chișinău
Sportul Studențesc București (Div. A)	7–1	(District) STB București
Crișana Oradea (Div. B)	2–6	(Div. A) Chinezul Timișoara
Rapid București (Div. A)	3–1	(Div. A) Ripensia Timișoara
Cetatea Sucevei Suceava (District)	2–4	(District) Monitorul Oficial București
Olimpia CFR Satu Mare (Div. B)	1–2	(Div. B) CAM Timișoara
Societatea Gimnastică Sibiu (Div. B)	2–1	(Div. B) Luceafărul București
Craiu Iovan Craiova (Div. B)	1–2	(Div. A) Carpați Baia Mare
Venus București (Div. A)	2–1	(Div. A) Juventus București
Minerul Lupeni (Div. B)	2–3 (a.e.t.)	(Div. A) UD Reșița
Dacia Vasile Alecsandri Galați (Div. B)	4–3 (a.e.t.)	(Div. A) Victoria Cluj
Textila Moldova Iași (Div. B)	3–0 (forfait)	(Div. A) Gloria Arad

== Second round proper ==
Team 1	Score	Team 2
19 March 1939
UD Reșița	1–2	AMEF Arad
Prahova Ploiești	12–2	Societatea Gimnastică Sibiu
Franco-Româna Brăila	2–5	Sportul Studențesc București
Dacia Vasile Alecsandri Galați	0–6	Rapid București
CAM Timișoara	3–2	Oltul Sfântu Gheorghe
Chinezul Timișoara	2–3	Venus București
Carpați Baia Mare	3–0 (forfeit)	Textila Moldova Iași
11 April 1939
Unirea Tricolor București	4–0	Monitorul Oficial București

== Quarter-finals ==
Team 1	Score	Team 2
2 April 1939
Venus București	3–1	Carpați Baia Mare
19 June 1939
AMEF Arad	5–2	Prahova Ploiești
24 June 1939
Rapid București	2–1 (a.e.t.)	Unirea Tricolor București
25 June 1939
Sportul Studențesc București	5–1	CAM Timișoara

== Semi-finals ==
Team 1	Score	Team 2
29 June 1939
Sportul Studențesc București	3–1	AMEF Arad
2 July 1939
Rapid București	2–0	Venus București

== Final ==
9 July 1939
17:45 EET

Rapid București	2–0	Sportul Studențesc București
Baratky 29', 70'	Report

Venus, Bucharest
Attendance: 12,000
Referee: Emil Kroner (Bucharest)

Cupa României 1938–39 winners

4th title
