= Petre Ivan =

Petre Ivan may refer to:

- Petre Ivan (footballer, born 1927), Romanian international footballer
- Petre Ivan (footballer, born 1946), Romanian international footballer

== See also ==
- Petre
