= CAM Timișoara =

Romanian football club

- Full name: Clubul Athletic Muncitoresc Timișoara
- Short name: CAMT
- Founded: 1936
- Dissolved: 1949

Clubul Athletic Muncitoresc Timișoara or shorter as CAM Timișoara was a football club based in Timișoara, western Romania. It was founded in the summer of 1936 after the merger of Reuniunea de Gimnastică a Muncitorilor din Timișoara (Workers Gimnastic Reunion from Timișoara) and Clubul Atletic Timișoara. CAM Timișoara played one Romanian Cup final in 1938.The club was dissolved in 1949.

== History ==
=== CA Timișoara - CAT ===
At the initiative of a group of young people from the 'Iosefin' neighborhood led by Dr. Péter Dobroszláv, in one of the halls of the City Report House, 'Elite Palace' (the building of the current restaurant "Sinaia") in Timișoara, then in Austria-Hungary, on April 26, 1902, is established the first club dedicated exclusively to football in Romania 'Football Club Timișoara' (FCT, in Hungarian TFC), which became after a few years Clubul Atletic Timișoara (CAT). The club had 30 members and white-green colors. The club was run by Dr. Adalbert Mesko - president, Rudolf Trinksz - vice-president and eng. Victor Covaci.

In 1913, the club won the 'Timișoara District Championship' with the following team: Drexler - Löbl, Soma, Scholmanski, Aichiger, Rausberger - Franz, Bauer, Weinberger, Molnár II, Molnár I.

After World War I it regularly participates at the Timișoara District Championship, starting with the autumn of 1921. Players used during the 1921–1927 period numbered a lot of known internationals, such as: Zimmermann, Kozovits, Holz, Raffinski.

At the end of the 1925–26 season, it finished first and qualified at the final tournament of the national championship. But, after a litigation it is replaced by Chinezul Timișoara and loses the chance to appear in the competition.

In 1934, CA wins the West League, using the following players: Konrad – Havas, Zarkoczy – Iania, Kohn, Faragó – Cărăbuș, Korony, Possak, Molnár, Somogy and plays a double play-off match to promote to the Divizia A against România Cluj. Although it won the first match, CA lost the rematch – set after a litigation – and instead of playing in the Divizia A, it played in the first season of the Divizia B.

In the summer of 1936, CA Timișoara disappeared after a merger with RGM Timișoara, the new team being named CAM Timișoara

=== Reuniunea de Gimnastică a Muncitorilor din Timișoara - RGMT ===
The second club that participated in the merger of 1936 was founded in 1911, under the name Reuniunea de gimnastică a muncitorilor din Timișoara (Workers Gimnastic Reunion from Timișoara), when it started officially in the district championship. Colours: red-black. The first president of the association was Sigismund Löbi. The usual team used during the period before World War I was: Holzer – Reuter I, Drexeler, Reuter II, Tóth, Horváth – Heich, R. Wetzer, Stepumer, Serly, Blum.

After the war, the club activated in the Timișoara District Championship, 1st Category, regularly finishing in the upper half of the table. Players used during the 1925–1929 period were: Pülöck, Grell, Zarda II, Koch, Steinbach, Radici, Wessely, Ranschau, Katai, Szlovik, Busza, Karlach, Sindelar, Szedlanik, Löwenfeld, Kovács, Antalescu, Palmer II, Loch, Stepan, Szabó, Szücs.

At the end of the 1929–30 season of the Regional Championship, the club finishes 1st and qualifies for the final tournament of the national championship, Divizia A 1929–30. It reaches the quarter-finals being eliminated by Gloria CFR Arad, 1–0.

In 1932–33, at the start of the newly formed Divizia A, RGM Timișoara becomes Timișoara's one of two representatives at this competitional level, alongside Ripensia Timișoara. It finishes 6th in the Seria II of the Divizia A 1932–33 and is obliged to participate at a play-off to avoid relegation. It plays against România Cluj and Juventus Bucharest and loses both matches. So it relegates to the District Championship. The team used in the Divizia A 1932–33: Fuch – Molnár, Hajdu – Gerber, Stepan, Máthé – Iovicin, Reuter, Löwenfeld, Stocksläger, Busza.

After one season in the Timișoara District Championship (1933–34), the club enters the first edition of the Divizia B and finishes the 1934–35 season 3rd in the Seria II. The next season RGM finishes 4th. Team used: Gervin – Gerber, Hajdu – Pokomy, Weidle, Morawetz – Seceni, Tóth, Stepan, Jánosi, Reuter.

=== CAM Timișoara ===
In August 1936, RGM Timișoara merges with CA Timișoara and becomes CAM Timișoara (Workers Athletic Club from Timișoara).

At the end of the 1937–38 season of the Divizia B the team finishes 2nd, behind UD Reşiţa. This was a good season for the club, as it was the first one that reached a Romanian Cup final while playing in Divizia B, which was lost with 2–3 against Rapid Bucharest.

At the end of the 1938–39 season of the Divizia B, the club finishes 1st in the Seria III. By doing this, they won the right to participate at a play-off for the promotion to the Divizia A. Their opponent was Mureşul Târgu Mureş. They succeeded to promote after (4–1, 0–1) with the following players: Eichler, Gerber, Kohn, Faragó, Szepe, Jánosi, Bücher, Zsizsik, Possak, Szeles II, Szöcs, Reuter, Golgoțiu, Ilieș, Tóth, Cota, Ciobanu, Persam.

CAM finishes 5th the Divizia A 1939–40, having in its squad Ripensia's international player Silviu Bindea.

The following season, CAM is excluded from the Divizia A and consequently plays in the Divizia B, Seria I, where it finishes 10th (last).

After World War II, the club merges for a brief period with Chinezul Timișoara, the new club being named Chinezul CAM Timișoara, but only until 1946 when it comes back to the CAM name. It plays in the Divizia B, finishing 9th and 2nd at the end of the 1946–47 and 1947–48 seasons. Players used: Sommer, Sandner, Androvits, Ramis, Mihailovici, Ban, Ferenczi I, Ferenczi II, Bozoki, Borzan, Cogan, Pakozdi, Lippai, Persam, Beth, Cotty, Andreescu, Nyiredi, Dușan, Weinhöpfel, Precup, Thierjung, Biró II.

At the end of the 1948–49 season of the Divizia B, CAM finishes 13th and relegates, and with this it disappears from the Romanian football firmament.

== Honours ==
Liga I:

- Fifth place: 1939–40

Liga II:

- Winners (1): 1938–39
- Runners-up (2): 1937–38, 1947–48

Romanian Cup

- Runners-up (1): 1937–38
