= László Raffinsky =

Hungarian-Romanian footballer (1905–1981)

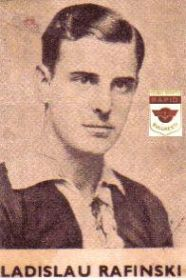
- Raffinsky c. 1930

Personal information
- Date of birth: 23 April 1905
- Place of birth: Miskolc, Hungary, Austria-Hungary
- Date of death: 31 July 1981 (aged 76)
- Place of death: Cluj-Napoca, Romania
- Position: Midfielder

Senior career*
Years	Team	Apps	(Gls)
1924–1925	Unirea Timișoara		
1925–1927	CA Timișoara		
1927–1929	Chinezul Timișoara		
1929–1931	Juventus București	20	(20)
1931–1933	Ripensia Timișoara (Note: Only statistics for the 1932–33 and 1932–33 Divizia A seasons are available.)	19	(15)
1934–1935	SK Židenice	15	(0)
1935	Viktoria Plzeň	8	(0)
1936	DFC Prag	10	(4)
1936–1940	Rapid București	46	(11)
Total		118	(50)

International career
1929–1938	Romania	20	(1)

Managerial career
- 1944–1945: Prahova Ploiești
- 1950: Mica Brad
- 1953: Prahova Ploiești
- 1954: Chimica Târnăveni
- 1955: Aurul Zlatna
- 1962–1964: Tehnofrig Cluj-Napoca
- * Club domestic league appearances and goals

László Raffinsky (Romanian: Ladislau Rafinski; 23 April 1905 – 31 July 1981) was a Romanian football player of Hungarian ethnicity who was a member of the Romanian team that participated at the 1930 FIFA World Cup in Uruguay and the 1938 edition of the same competition held in France. He holds the record of most goals scored in a Romanian first league match, having netted ten goals for Juventus București against Dacia Unirea Brăila in the 1929–30 season.

== Club career ==
Raffinsky was born on 23 April 1905 in Miskolc, Austria-Hungary and began playing football at age 19 in 1924 at Unirea Timișoara. In 1925, he moved to CA Timișoara where he spent two years before going to Chinezul Timișoara. In 1929, together with his teammate Emerich Vogl he went to Juventus București. In the 1929–30 Divizia A season, he helped Juventus win the championship title. During this season, he set a Divizia A record by netting 10 goals in a single match, a 16–0 victory from the quarter-finals against Dacia Unirea Brăila. He also opened the score in the 3–0 victory against Gloria CFR Arad in the final. In 1931, he returned to Timișoara, to play for Ripensia, winning the title in the 1932–33 season, coach Jenő Konrád using him in 13 games in which he scored 11 goals, also playing in the final against Universitatea Cluj.

In 1934, Raffinsky left Romania to go play for a few years in the Czechoslovak First League for SK Židenice, Viktoria Plzeň and DFC Prag. He came back to Romania in 1936, joining Rapid București where he ended his career in 1940. During his years with The Railwaymen, Raffinsky won four consecutive Cupa României titles, but played in only one of the finals, the 3–2 victory against CAM Timișoara in 1938, where he scored the victory goal from a penalty. In May 1938, he was arrested, together with three other Rapid teammates, Iuliu Baratky, Ștefan Auer and Vintilă Cossini, because of their 2–1 win in the 1937–38 Cupa României semi-finals against Venus București. The arrest was at the order of Gabriel Marinescu, the Minister of Internal Affairs and the Prefect of București, who was also the chairman of Venus. After one day spent in jail and following the decision that the semi-final be replayed, the four players were released. Rapid also won the replay 4–2 against Venus. Raffinsky also played four matches in the 1938 Mitropa Cup, scoring once to help Rapid eliminate Újpest in the opening round, before exiting in the quarter-finals against Genoa.

== International career ==
Raffinsky won twenty caps for Romania, making his debut on 10 May 1929 under coach Constantin Rădulescu in a 3–2 home loss to Yugoslavia in the friendly King Alexander's Cup. He scored his first and only goal for the national team in a 8–1 home victory against Greece during the successful 1929–31 Balkan Cup.

He was selected by coach Rădulescu to be part of the squad for the 1930 World Cup, but the chairman of Astra Română, a company where Raffinsky and his teammate Emerich Vogl were office workers, forbade the two players from leaving their workplace. Eventually, after the Romanian Football Federation's secretary Octav Luchide went to the company with a letter from King Carol II, they were allowed to participate. Raffinsky played in both Group 3 matches at that World Cup, a 3–1 win over Peru and a 4–0 loss to hosts and eventual world champions Uruguay. In the match against Peru, Plácido Galindo fouled him and was sent off, marking the first-ever dismissal in FIFA World Cup history. He was also included in the 1930 World Cup Best XI.

Raffinsky was not called up again to the national team until 1932, when he played in a 6–3 friendly victory against France. Afterwards he appeared in three games in the 1932 Balkan Cup, which included two losses to Bulgaria and Yugoslavia and a win over Greece.

He was selected by coaches Săvulescu and Rădulescu to be part of the squad that participated in the 1938 World Cup. He played for the entirety of both games against Cuba, the first one ended in a 3–3 draw, followed by a surprising 2–1 loss in the replay. These two matches were Raffinsky's last appearances for the national team.

=== International goals ===
Scores and results list Romania's goal tally first. "Score" column indicates the score after each László Raffinsky goal.

#	Date	Venue	Opponent	Score	Result	Competition
1.	25 May 1930	ONEF Stadium, Bucharest, Romania	Greece	4–1	8–1	1929–31 Balkan Cup

== Managerial career ==
Raffinsky began his managerial career in 1944, coaching Prahova Ploiești. He was the manager of the Ploiești team until 1945. Subsequently, he was the coach of several Divizia B and Divizia C clubs, such as Mica Brad, Chimica Târnăveni and Aurul Zlatna, and also made a comeback at Prahova Ploiești in 1953. In 1962, he moved to Cluj-Napoca, being for two years the manager of Tehnofrig, a small football club of the factory with the same name. In 1964, Raffinsky retired from football.

== Death ==
Raffinsky died on 31 July 1981 at age 76 in Cluj-Napoca, Romania.

== Honours ==
=== Club ===
Juventus București

- Divizia A: 1929–30

Ripensia Timișoara

- Divizia A: 1932–33

Rapid București

- Cupa României: 1936–37, 1937–38, 1938–39, 1939–40

=== International ===
Romania

- Balkan Cup: 1929–31
