= Elemér Kocsis =

Romanian footballer and coach

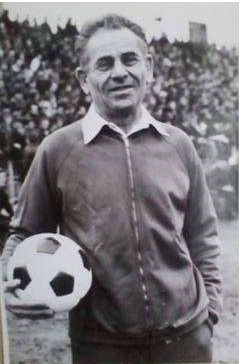

Personal information
- Date of birth: 26 February 1910
- Place of birth: Salonta, Romania
- Date of death: 6 October 1981 (aged 71)
- Position: Forward

Youth career
- 1924–1926: CS Salonta

Senior career*
Years	Team	Apps	(Gls)
1926–1928	CS Salonta		
1928–1937	CA Oradea	102	(52)
1937–1948	Tricolorul Ploiești	55	(10)
Total		157	(62)

International career
1931–1933	Romania	12	(5)

Managerial career
- 1948–1950: Tricolorul Ploiești
- 1950–1953: CFR Oradea
- 1953: Progresul Oradea
- 1955: Avântul Reghin
- Someșul Satu Mare
- Chimica Târnăveni
- Gloria Bistrița
- 1967–1972: Crișul Oradea (youth center)
- * Club domestic league appearances and goals

Elemér Kocsis (Romanian: Elemer Cociș; 26 February 1910 – 6 October 1981, in Romania) was a Hungarian Romanian football forward and coach.

== Career ==
During his career he has made twelve appearances and five goal for the Romania national team. His career in club football was spent at CS Salonta between 1924 and 1928, at CA Oradea in 1928-1937 and at FC Ploieşti in 1948. For CAO he played in over 100 league matches and scored 52 goals.

== Personal life ==
His son, Elemer Cociș jr. (born 30 March 1946) was also a top-flight player that played for FC Bihor Oradea in the late 1960s and early 1970s.

== Honours ==
=== Player ===
FC Ploieşti

- Liga II (3): 1937–38, 1939–40, 1946–47
