= 1935–36 Cupa României =

1934–35 Cupa României
Tournament details
- Country: Romania
- Teams: 68

Final positions
- Champions: Ripensia Timișoara
- Runners-up: Unirea Tricolor București

Tournament statistics
- Matches played: 34
- Goals scored: 165 (4.85 per match)

The 1935–36 Cupa României was the third edition of Romania's most prestigious football cup competition.

The trophy was obtained by Ripensia Timișoara who defeated Unirea Tricolor București in the final. It was the second and last Romanian Cup won by Ripensia Timișoara.

== Format ==
The competition is an annual knockout tournament with pairings for each round drawn at random.

There are no seeds for the draw. The draw also determines which teams will play at home. Each tie is played as a single leg.

If a match is drawn after 90 minutes, the game goes in extra time, and if the scored is still tight after 120 minutes, there a replay will be played, usually at the ground of the team who were away for the first game.

From the first edition, the teams from Divizia A entered in competition in sixteen finals, rule which remained till today.

The format is quite similar to the oldest recognised football tournament in the world, the FA Cup.

== Bracket ==
Round of 32
Minerul Lupeni	(w)
Herdan București	(o)
Vulturii Textila Lugoj	6
Sparta Mediaș	2
CFR București	2
Ripensia Timișoara	3
CFR Brașov	0
Crişana Oradea	1
Șoimii Sibiu	1
Gloria Arad	6
Dacia VA Galați	5
SS Sighişoara	0
Universitatea Cluj	4
Electrica Timișoara	2
Dragoş Vodă Cernăuţi	3
AMEF Arad	0
Textila Moldova Iași	1
Phoenix Baia Mare	3
Unirea Tricolor București	5
Victoria Cluj	2
Oltul Turnu Măgurele	2
Franco-Româna Brăila	4
Dacia Unirea Brăila	1
Chinezul Timișoara	2
Juventus București	7
Sportul Studențesc	1
Maccabi București	2
Olimpia CFR Satu Mare	1
Elpis Constanța	2
Venus București	3
CA Oradea	2
ILSA Timișoara	0

Round of 16
Minerul Lupeni	3
Vulturii Textila Lugoj	2
Ripensia Timișoara	8
Crişana Oradea	3
Gloria Arad	6
Dacia VA Galați	0
Universitatea Cluj	4
Dragoş Vodă Cernăuţi	1
Phoenix Baia Mare	0
Unirea Tricolor București	2
Franco-Româna Brăila	3
Chinezul Timișoara	1
Juventus București	3
Maccabi București	1
Venus București	2
CA Oradea	0

Quarter-finals
Minerul Lupeni	2
Ripensia Timișoara	9
Gloria Arad	0
Universitatea Cluj	2
Unirea Tricolor București	6
Franco-Româna Brăila	4
Juventus București	3
Venus București	1

Semi-finals
Ripensia Timișoara	4
Universitatea Cluj	2
Unirea Tricolor București	4
Juventus București	1

Final
Ripensia Timișoara	5
Unirea Tricolor București	1

== First round proper ==
Team 1	Score	Team 2
21 March 1936
Unirea Tricolor București (Div. A)	5–2	(Div. A) Victoria Cluj
22 March 1936
Dacia Vasile Alecsandri Galați (Div. B)	5–0	(District) SS Sighişoara
CA Oradea (Div. A)	2–0	(Div. B) ILSA Timișoara
AS CFR Brașov (Div. B)	0–1	(Div. A) Crișana Oradea
Juventus București (Div. A)	7–1	(Div. B) Sportul Studențesc București
Șoimii Sibiu (Div. B)	1–6	(Div. A) Gloria Arad
Vulturii Textila Lugoj (Div. B)	6–2	(District) Sparta Mediaș
Textila Moldova Iași (Div. B)	1–3	(Div. B) Phoenix Baia Mare
Oltul Turnu Măgurele (District)	2–4	(Div. B) Franco-Româna Brăila
Maccabi București (Div. B)	2–1	(Div. B) Olimpia CFR Satu Mare
Dacia Unirea Brăila (Div. B)	1–2	(Div. A) Chinezul Timișoara
Elpis Constanța (Div. B)	2–3	(Div. B) Venus București
CFR București (Div. A)	2–3	(Div. A) Ripensia Timișoara
Dragoş Vodă Cernăuţi (Div. B)	3–0	(Div. B) AMEF Arad
Minerul Lupeni (Div. B)	Bye^{1}	(District) Herdan București
Electrica Timișoara (District)	0–0	(Div. A) Universitatea Cluj
1 April 1936 — Replay
Universitatea Cluj (Div. A)	4–2 (R)	(District) Electrica Timișoara

Notes

- Note 1: Minerul Lupeni qualified to the next round because of abolition of Herdan București.

== Second round proper ==
Team 1	Score	Team 2
5 April 1936
Gloria Arad	6–0	Dacia Vasile Alecsandri Galați
Phoenix Baia Mare	0–2	Unirea Tricolor București
Franco-Româna Brăila	3–1	Chinezul Timișoara
Venus București	2–0	CA Oradea
Juventus București	3–1	Maccabi București
Universitatea Cluj	4–1	Dragoş Vodă Cernăuţi
Minerul Lupeni	3–2	Vulturii Textila Lugoj
Ripensia Timişoara	2–2	Crişana Oradea
12 April 1936 — Replay
Crişana Oradea	2–2	Ripensia Timişoara
18 April 1936 — Replay
Ripensia Timişoara	8–3 (R)	Crişana Oradea

== Quarter-finals ==
Team 1	Score	Team 2
18 April 1936
Juventus București	3–1	Venus București
19 April 1936
Gloria Arad	0–2	Universitatea Cluj
Unirea Tricolor București	6–4	Franco-Româna Brăila
31 May 1936
Minerul Lupeni	2–9	Ripensia Timișoara

== Semi-finals ==
Team 1	Score	Team 2
7 June 1936
Unirea Tricolor București	4–1	Juventus București
Ripensia Timișoara	4–2	Universitatea Cluj

== Final ==
21 June 1936
18:00 EET

Ripensia Timișoara	5–1	Unirea Tricolor București
Dobay 44'; Schwartz 55', 87'; Ciolac 61', 85'	Report	Niculescu 50' (pen.)

Venus, Bucharest
Attendance: 18,000
Referee: Constantin Iliescu (Bucharest)

Cupa României 1935–36 winners

2nd title
