= Alexandru Cuedan =

Romanian footballer

Personal information
- Date of birth: 26 September 1910
- Place of birth: Arad, Austria-Hungary
- Date of death: 9 May 1976 (aged 65)
- Position: Defender

Youth career
- 1922–1930: Olimpia Arad

Senior career*
Years	Team	Apps	(Gls)
1930–1933	Olimpia Arad		
1933–1939	Rapid București	75	(3)
1939–1940	Olympia București		
1947–1948	Rapid București		

International career
1935	Romania	4	(0)
- * Club domestic league appearances and goals

Alexandru Cuedan (26 September 1910 in Austria-Hungary (now Romania) – 9 May 1976) was a Romanian footballer who played as a defender.

== Biography ==
At club level, he played in Liga I for Rapid București, one of many clubs in the Romanian capital.

With the Romania national football team, he was picked by joint coaches Josef Uridil and Costel Rădulescu to take part in the 1934 World Cup in Italy. The team were eliminated in the first round by Czechoslovakia, 2–1.

== Honours ==
Rapid București

- Cupa României (3): 1936–37, 1937–38, 1938–39
