= Nicolae Munteanu =

Nicolae Munteanu can refer to:

- Nicolae Munteanu (footballer)
- Nicolae Munteanu (handball)
- Nicolae Munteanu (ski jumper)
