= FC Ploiești (disambiguation) =

FC Ploieşti may refer to three Romanian football clubs:

- FC Ploieşti - The first club named FC Ploieşti (1940–49).
- FC Petrolul Ploieşti - It was named FC Ploieşti between 1992 and 1993.
- FC Astra Giurgiu - It was named FC Ploieşti between 2007 and 2009.
