= Alexandru Leitner =

Romanian footballer

Personal information
- Date of birth: 24 June 1901
- Date of death: Unknown
- Position: Defender

Senior career*
| Years | Team | Apps | (Gls) |
| 1922–1924 | Victoria Cluj | | |

International career
| 1923 | Romania | 1 | (0) |
- * Club domestic league appearances and goals

Alexandru Leitner (born 24 June 1901, date of death unknown) was a Romanian footballer who played as a defender.

== International career ==
Alexandru Leitner played one friendly match for Romania, on 2 September 1923 under coach Teofil Morariu in a 1–1 against Poland.
