= Ioan Krieshofer =

Romanian footballer

Personal information
- Date of birth: 27 September 1900
- Date of death: Unknown
- Position: Defender

Senior career*
Years	Team	Apps	(Gls)
1923–1925	Victoria Cluj		

International career
1924	Romania	1	(0)
- * Club domestic league appearances and goals

Ioan Krieshofer (born 27 September 1900, date of death unknown) was a Romanian footballer who played as a defender.

== International career ==
Ioan Krieshofer played one friendly match for Romania, on 31 August 1924 under coach Teofil Morariu in a 4–1 loss against Czechoslovakia.
