= Wilhelm Possak =

Romanian footballer (1906–1988)

Personal information
- Date of birth: 9 August 1906
- Place of birth: Vienna, Austria-Hungary
- Date of death: 4 April 1988 (aged 81)
- Place of death: Vienna, Austria
- Position: Forward

Senior career*
Years	Team	Apps	(Gls)
1920–1921	Vasas		
1921–1923	Kalaposok		
1923–1928	CA Timișoara		
1928–1930	Bástya Szegedi	45	(31)
1931	Újpest	4	(4)
1931–1932	Vasas	15	(10)
1932–1933	Biel		
1933–1934	CA Timișoara		
1935	Nordstern Basel	9	(3)
1935–1937	Sporting CP	6	(2)
1937–1938	Piestany		
1938–1940	CAM Timișoara (Note: The statistics for the 1938–39 Divizia B season are unavailable.)	3	(1)
Total		82	(51)

International career
1928	Romania	2	(1)

Managerial career
- 1935–1937: Sporting CP
- 1938–1940: CAM Timișoara
- * Club domestic league appearances and goals

Wilhelm Possak, also known as Vilmos Possák (9 August 1906 – 4 April 1988) was a Romanian football player and coach.

== Club career ==
Possak was born on 9 August 1906 in Vienna, Austria-Hungary, but grew up in Timișoara. He began playing football in 1920 at Hungarian side Vasas. One year later he went to Kalaposok for two years. In 1923, Possak returned to his childhood town, joining CA Timișoara for a five-year spell.

Subsequently, he went back to Hungary, signing with Bástya Szegedi where he made his Nemzeti Bajnokság I debut on 11 November 1928 under coach Weiglhoffer Karl in a 2–1 win over Kispest in which Possak scored once. One week later he netted a brace in a 6–1 victory against Budai 33. He scored a total of 10 goals until the end of the season, including another two doubles in a 3–3 draw against Vasas and a 3–0 win over Kispest. Possak started the next season by scoring four goals in a 5–0 success against Bocskai, totaling 13 goals in the season. In the middle of the 1930–31 season, he left Bástya to go play for Újpest. There, he scored two doubles in his first two matches which were wins over Vasas and Kispest, with those four goals being the only ones scored in the four matches played as the club won the title. Afterwards, Possak made a comeback to Vasas, where in his first match he scored a brace in a 3–1 victory against Sabaria. He made his last Nemzeti Bajnokság I appearance on 10 June 1932, as Vasas earned a 5–3 win over Attila, totaling 64 matches with 45 goals in the competition.

In 1932, Possak went for one year for Swiss side Biel. Then he made a comeback to CA Timișoara. For the 1934–35 season, he returned to Switzerland, playing nine league games with three goals scored for Nordstern Basel.

Possak was appointed as a player-coach by Sporting CP in October 1935. He made his Campeonato da Liga debut on 12 January 1936 in a 3–2 win over rivals Porto. On 2 February he netted his first goal in a 6–1 victory against Académica de Coimbra. Possak scored his second league goal on 2 March in a 10–1 loss to Porto. He finished the season by winning the Campeonato de Lisboa and Campeonato de Portugal (Taça de Portugal). In the following season, he played only a single match, winning the Campeonato de Lisboa once again. He left the club in February 1937, having a total of 15 matches played with seven goals scored for Sporting across all competitions, of which six games and two goals were in the Campeonato da Liga. His following spell was in Slovakia at Piestany.

In 1938, Possak went as a player-coach at CAM Timișoara in Divizia B, helping them earn promotion to the first league at the end of the season. Subsequently, he made his Divizia A debut on 5 November 1939 in a 3–2 home victory against Phoenix Baia Mare. He scored his only goal in the first league on 3 December in a 1–1 draw against Ripensia Timișoara. His third and last Divizia A appearance took place on 17 March 1940 in a 6–1 loss to Vagonul Arad.

== International career ==
Possak earned two caps for Romania, making his debut on 15 April 1928 when coach Teofil Morariu sent him at halftime to replace Aurel Guga in a 4–2 friendly victory against Turkey. He scored his only goal for the national team in his second game, a 3–1 loss to Yugoslavia in the friendly 1928 King Alexander's Cup.

== Managerial career ==
Possak was appointed as a player-coach by Sporting CP in October 1935 to replace Filipe dos Santos who lost 4–0 in a Campeonato de Lisboa derby against Benfica. The team eventually won the Campeonato de Lisboa after defeating Benfica 4–1 in the last round. He won his second trophy, the Campeonato de Portugal (Taça de Portugal), after a 3–1 victory against Belenenses in the final. They also finished third in the Campeonato da Liga where The Lions suffered a 10–1 loss to rivals Porto. In the following season the team won another Campeonato de Lisboa. However, Possak was dismissed in February 1937 after some poor results in the championship which included a 4–1 loss to Benfica. During his tenure, the first three Brazilians in the club's history, namely Jaguaré, Vianinha and Fernando Giudicelli, made their debut for the team. He led Sporting in 46 matches as a coach, consisting of 32 victories, six draws and eight losses.

Possak went as a player-coach at CAM Timișoara in Divizia B, and helped them earn promotion to the first league at the end of the 1938–39 season. Subsequently, in the 1939–40 Divizia A season, the team finished in fifth place.

== Death ==
Possak died on 4 April 1988 at age 81 in his native Vienna.

== Playing statistics ==
Scores and results list Romania's goal tally first, score column indicates score after each Possak goal.

List of international goals scored by Wilhelm Possak
#	Date	Venue	Opponent	Score	Result	Competition
1	6 May 1928	Stadion SK Jugoslavija, Belgrade, Yugoslavia	Yugoslavia	1–3	1–3	1928 King Alexander's Cup

== Honours ==
=== Player ===
Sporting CP

- Campeonato de Portugal: 1935–36
- Campeonato de Lisboa: 1935–36, 1936–37

CAM Timișoara

- Divizia B: 1938–39

=== Manager ===
Sporting CP

- Campeonato de Portugal: 1935–36
- Campeonato de Lisboa: 1935–36, 1936–37

CAM Timișoara

- Divizia B: 1938–39
