= Marius Suller =

Romanian footballer and coach

Personal information
- Full name: Marius Attila Suller
- Date of birth: 5 September 1978 (age 48)
- Place of birth: Cluj-Napoca, Romania
- Height: 1.76 m (5 ft 9 in)
- Position: Defender

Team information
- Current team: Rapid București (assistant)

Youth career
- Universitatea Cluj

Senior career*
Years	Team	Apps	(Gls)
2000–2002	Minerul Vatra Dornei		
2002–2009	Universitatea Cluj	104	(2)
2003	→ Unirea Dej (loan)		
2003–2004	→ Olimpia Gherla (loan)		
Total		104	(2)

Managerial career
- 2010–2011: Politehnica Iași (assistant)
- 2012: Unirea Dej (assistant)
- 2013–2014: UTA Arad (assistant)
- 2014: ASA Târgu Mureș (assistant)
- 2015: Universitatea Cluj (assistant)
- 2015: Al Urooba (assistant)
- 2015–2016: Concordia Chiajna (assistant)
- 2017–2018: Universitatea Cluj (assistant)
- 2019: Concordia Chiajna (assistant)
- 2019: Victoria Cluj
- 2020: Universitatea Cluj (assistant)
- 2021: CSM Reșița (assistant)
- 2021–2022: Victoria Cluj
- 2022–2023: Universitatea Cluj U19
- 2024: Botoșani (assistant)
- 2024–2026: Argeș Pitești (assistant)
- 2026–: Rapid București (assistant)
- * Club domestic league appearances and goals

Marius Attila Suller (born 5 September 1978) is a Romanian football coach and former player, currently assistant coach at Liga I club Rapid București.

== Honours ==
Universitatea Cluj

- Liga II: 2006–07
