= Iacob Felecan =

Romanian footballer (1914–1964)

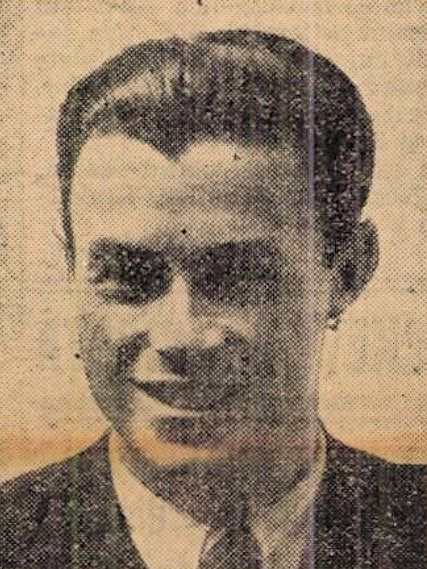

Personal information
- Date of birth: 30 May 1914
- Place of birth: Cluj-Napoca, Romania
- Date of death: 1988 (aged 73–74)
- Position: Defender

Senior career*
Years	Team	Apps	(Gls)
1930–1940	Victoria Cluj	145	(1)
1940–1942	Ripensia Timișoara	20	(0)
1942–1944	FC Craiova (Note: The 1940–41 Divizia A was the last season before World War II and the 1946–47 Divizia A was the first one after, so the appearances and goals scored during this period for FC Craiova are not official.)	0	(0)
1945–1946	Victoria Cluj		
1947–1949	CFR Cluj	39	(0)
Total		204	(1)

International career
1937–1943	Romania	9	(0)

Managerial career
- 1945–1946: Victoria Cluj
- * Club domestic league appearances and goals

Iacob Felecan (30 May 1914 – 1988) was a Romanian footballer who played as a defender for Romania in the 1938 FIFA World Cup.

== Club career ==
Felecan was born on 30 May 1914 in Cluj-Napoca, Austria-Hungary. He began playing football in 1930 at local club, Victoria. Subsequently, he made his Divizia A debut on 11 September 1932 in a 2–1 home loss to Gloria Arad. In 1940, Felecan joined Ripensia Timișoara, as the northern part of Transylvania was ceded to Hungary due to the Second Vienna Award and he refused to stay in Cluj-Napoca under the Hungarian administration. Two years later, he went to play for FC Craiova, with whom he won the 1942–43 championship which was not recognized by the Romanian Football Federation. In 1945, after the end of the Second World War and the return of the northern part of Transylvania to Romania, Felecan returned to Victoria Cluj as a player-coach. After two years, he went to play for CFR Cluj. There, on 3 July 1949, he made his last Divizia A appearance in a 5–2 loss to Dinamo București, totaling 204 matches with one goal in the competition (without counting the unofficial appearances for FC Craiova).

== International career ==
Felecan played nine games for Romania, making his debut on 4 July 1937 under coach Constantin Rădulescu in a friendly that ended in a 4–2 away win over Poland. He was selected by coaches Alexandru Săvulescu and Rădulescu to be part of the squad that participated in the 1938 World Cup. He did not appear in the first game against Cuba that ended in a 3–3 draw, but Felecan played in the replay which ended in a surprising 2–1 loss. His last appearance for the national team took place on 13 June 1943 in a 2–2 friendly draw against Slovakia.

== Personal life and death ==
Felecan's brother, Theodor, was also a footballer.

Shortly after ending his playing career, Felecan refused to be a member of the Romanian Communist Party and consequentially was forced to work at the Danube–Black Sea Canal. He died in 1988.
