= 1946–47 Divizia B =

Divizia B
- Season: 1946–47
- Promoted: Unirea Tricolor București; Ploiești; Dermata Cluj; Karres Mediaș
- Relegated: Sparta București; Feroemail Ploiești; Victoria Cluj

The 1946–47 Divizia B was the eighth season of the second tier of the Romanian football league system.

The league was resumed after five years in which was suspended due to World War II. The format of three series was maintained, but this time the series were much larger, 15 teams in the first one, 14 for each of the other two. This season is practically the beginning of the professionalism of Romanian football, new clubs are enrolled, others are moved back in the Romanian championship. At the end of the season four teams promoted to Divizia A, the winners of the series and a fourth team established after a promotion play-off between second places and the best third place.

== Team changes ==
The classic format of promotion and relegation is not relevant this season because after a pause of 5 years and due to the troubled historical frame, many teams were dissolved, others were newly founded and submitted directly in the Divizia A or Divizia B and also the teams which were moved in the Hungarian football league system in 1940 after the signing of the Second Vienna Award were moved now back in the Romanian football league system after the signing of the Paris Peace Treaties. These teams were submitted also in different leagues, based much more on their situation at that time, not on their last rank in the Romanian football league system.

=== Promoted teams ===
Jiul Petroșani and Juventus București were promoted to Divizia A, meritorious promotion due to their rankings at the end of the 1940–41 season 1st place in their series.

CFR Timișoara (6th, Serie I) and Prahova Ploiești (7th, Serie III) were also promoted to Divizia A.

=== Relegated teams ===
Cimentul Turda, Franco-Româna Brăila, Metalosport Călan and Vitrometan Mediaș were relegated to Divizia C.

Dacia VA Galați was relegated in the local championship.

Ripensia Timișoara (3rd, Divizia A) and FC Brăila (13th, Divizia A) were relegated directly to Divizia C, without playing in the second season.

=== New teams ===
Unirea Tricolor București was the champion of Romania at the end of the 1940–41 season, but restarted the championship in the Divizia B.

Venus București (4th, Divizia A), Mica Brad (5th, Divizia A), Sportul Studențesc (6th, Divizia A), FC Ploiești (10th, Divizia A), Gloria CFR Galați (12th, Divizia A) restarted the championship in the Divizia B.

Gloria Arad (8th, Divizia A), promoted in 1940, was relegated back to the second league.

AMEF Arad and Feroemail Ploiești were re-enrolled in the Romanian football league system after the abusively exclusion commanded by the legionary regime in 1940.

CFR Târgu Mureș, Crișana Oradea, Dermata Cluj, Oltul Sfântu Gheorghe, Phoenix Baia Mare, Stăruința Satu Mare and Victoria Cluj moved in the Romanian football league system due to the Paris Peace Treaties, territory of Northern Transylvania being assigned from Hungary back to Romania.

Arsenal Sibiu, CFR Craiova, CFR Caracal, CFR Turda, Dezrobirea Constanța, FC Călărași, Grivița CFR București, IAR Brașov, Karres Mediaș, Politehnica Iași, Sparta Arad, Sporting Pitești, Socec Lafayette București, Solvay Uioara, ST București, Șurianul Sebeș and Textila Buhuși were promoted to Divizia B due to the results obtained in the regional championships.

=== Dissolved teams ===
AS Constanța, Ateneul Tătărași Iași, Olympia București, Rapid Timișoara and Turda București were dissolved.

=== Renamed teams ===
Crișana CFR Arad was renamed as CFR Arad.

Oltul Sfântu Gheorghe was renamed as Textila Sfântu Gheorghe.

Sportul Studențesc București was renamed as Sparta București

SSM Reșița was renamed as Locomotiva Reșița.

Vulturii Textila Lugoj was renamed as 23 August Lugoj.

=== Other teams ===
Chinezul Timișoara and CAM Timișoara merged, the first one being absorbed by the second one.

Crișana Oradea and CFR Oradea merged and the club was renamed as Crișana CFR Oradea.

== League map ==
Locations of Divizia B clubs by series
Seria I
Seria II
Seria III

== League tables ==
=== Serie I ===
Pos	Team	Pld	W	D	L	GF	GA	GD	Pts	Promotion
1	Unirea Tricolor București (C, P)	28	21	4	3	113	34	+79	46	Promotion to Divizia A
2	AMEF Arad	28	19	4	5	71	28	+43	42	Qualification to promotion play-off
3	Politehnica Timișoara	28	19	4	5	88	31	+57	42	Qualification to promotion play-off
4	Sparta Arad	28	15	8	5	72	34	+38	38	
5	Venus București	28	14	3	11	58	46	+12	31	
6	CFR Arad	28	12	6	10	49	50	−1	30	
7	Electrica Timișoara	28	12	5	11	52	43	+9	29	
8	CFR Simeria	28	12	3	13	52	64	−12	27	
9	CAM Timișoara	28	11	3	14	55	53	+2	25	
10	CFR Turnu Severin	28	10	3	15	34	59	−25	23	
11	Locomotiva Reșița	28	9	2	17	38	72	−34	20	
12	Gloria Arad	28	8	4	16	35	54	−19	20	
13	CFR Craiova	28	6	4	18	25	64	−39	16	
14	CFR Caracal	28	6	3	19	50	109	−59	15	
15	23 August Lugoj	28	7	0	21	31	88	−57	14	

Source: romaniansoccer.ro
Rules for classification: 1) Points 2) Head-to-head points; 3) Head-to-head goal difference; 4) Head-to-head goals scored; 5) Head-to-head away goals scored; 6) Goal difference; 7) Goals scored.
(C) Champions; (P) Promoted

=== Serie II ===
Pos	Team	Pld	W	D	L	GF	GA	GD	Pts	Promotion or relegation
1	Ploiești (C, P)	26	16	5	5	56	31	+25	37	Promotion to Divizia A
2	Textila Sfântu Gheorghe	26	16	5	5	72	42	+30	37	Withdrew from the promotion play-off
3	Textila Buhuși	26	13	8	5	68	36	+32	34	Qualification to promotion play-off
4	Sporting Pitești	26	11	8	7	66	59	+7	30	
5	Călărași	26	13	3	10	62	59	+3	29	
6	ST București	26	11	5	10	67	67	0	27	
7	Dezrobirea Constanța	26	11	4	11	54	57	−3	26	
8	IAR Brașov	26	10	4	12	52	56	−4	24	
9	Gloria CFR Galați	26	12	0	14	53	72	−19	24	
10	Socec Lafayette București	26	10	4	12	69	77	−8	24	
11	Grivița CFR București	26	9	5	12	51	47	+4	23	
12	Sparta București (R)	26	5	7	14	36	56	−20	17	Relegation to Divizia C
13	Politehnica Iași	26	5	7	14	48	66	−18	17	
14	Feroemail Ploiești (R)	26	6	3	17	35	64	−29	15	Relegation to Divizia C

Source: romaniansoccer.ro
Rules for classification: 1) Points 2) Head-to-head points; 3) Head-to-head goal difference; 4) Head-to-head goals scored; 5) Head-to-head away goals scored; 6) Goal difference; 7) Goals scored.
(C) Champions; (P) Promoted; (R) Relegated

=== Serie III ===
Pos	Team	Pld	W	D	L	GF	GA	GD	Pts	Promotion or relegation
1	Dermata Cluj (C, P)	26	20	5	1	77	16	+61	45	Promotion to Divizia A
2	Karres Mediaș (O, P)	26	17	3	6	71	39	+32	37	Qualification to promotion play-off
3	Phoenix Baia Mare	26	15	4	7	58	35	+23	34	
4	Crișana CFR Oradea	26	15	2	9	53	33	+20	32	
5	Șurianul Sebeș	26	13	4	9	51	42	+9	30	
6	Arsenal Sibiu	26	9	8	9	46	57	−11	26	
7	Solvay Uioara	26	11	3	12	50	61	−11	25	
8	CFR Târgu Mureș	26	11	2	13	38	41	−3	24	
9	Mica Brad	26	9	5	12	36	42	−6	23	
10	Stăruința Satu Mare	26	6	11	9	33	47	−14	23	
11	IS Câmpia Turzii	26	8	6	12	44	50	−6	22	
12	Minerul Lupeni	26	8	5	13	38	44	−6	21	
13	CFR Turda	26	4	3	19	18	61	−43	11	
14	Victoria Cluj (E)	26	4	3	19	26	71	−45	11	Club dissolved

Source: romaniansoccer.ro
Rules for classification: 1) Points 2) Head-to-head points; 3) Head-to-head goal difference; 4) Head-to-head goals scored; 5) Head-to-head away goals scored; 6) Goal difference; 7) Goals scored.
(C) Champions; (E) Eliminated; (O) Play-off winners; (P) Promoted

== Promotion play-off ==
Second place from each series and the best third place played a promotion play-off to decide the fourth team which promoted to 1947–48 Divizia A.

=== Semi-finals ===
Team 1	Score	Team 2
Karres Mediaș (SIII)	2–1	(SI) AMEF Arad
Textila Buhuși (SII)	1–0	(SI) Politehnica Timișoara

=== Final ===
Team 1	Score	Team 2
Karres Mediaș (SIII)	4–1	(SII) Textila Buhuși

Notes:

- Karres Mediaș promoted to 1947–48 Divizia A.

== See also ==
- 1946–47 Divizia A
