= CSM Aurul Brad =

Romanian football club

Aurul Brad
- Full name: Clubul Sportiv Municipal Aurul Brad
- Nicknames: Aurarii (The Goldsmiths); Moții (Inhabitants of Țara Moților); Galben-Negrii (The Black and Yellows)
- Short name: Aurul
- Founded: 1934; 92 years ago as Mica Brad
- Ground: Aurul
- Capacity: 1,500
- Owner: Brad Municipality
- Chairman: Valentin Verdeș
- Manager: Mihai Leaha
- League: Liga IV
- 2025–26: Liga IV, Hunedoara County, 6th of 11
- Website: https://aurulbrad.wordpress.com/
Home colours	Away colours

Clubul Sportiv Municipal Aurul Brad, commonly known as CSM Aurul Brad, or simply as Aurul Brad, is a Romanian amateur football club based in Brad, Hunedoara County, founded in 1934. The club is currently playing in the Liga IV.

== History ==
Aurul Brad was founded in 1934, under the name of Mica Brad, its first coach being Ion "Ale" Popescu. Throughout its over 85 years of history, the club was also known as Metalul Brad or Progresul Brad.

In the 1940–41 season, Aurul Brad played in the Divizia A, the first tier of the Romanian football league system. This was a notable achievement for a small town like Brad and the team was also able to finish in 5th, out of 13. That was the last season before World War II. After WWII, Aurul never managed to play again in the first league, despite it was never relegated.

== Ground ==
The team plays its home matches in Brad, Hunedoara County, on the Aurul Stadium, with a capacity of 1,500 seats.

== Chronology of names ==
Period	Name
1934–1950	Mica Brad
1950–1957	Metalul Brad
1957–1958	Progresul Brad
1958–present	Aurul Brad

== Honours ==
Liga II

- Winners (1): 1939–40

Liga III

- Winners (2): 1975–76, 1989–90

Liga IV – Hunedoara County

- Winners (3): 1996–97, 1997–98, 2020–21
- Runners-up (5) 1994–95, 2008–09, 2009–10, 2011–12, 2023–24

Hunedoara Regional Championship:

- Winners (3): 1956, 1959–60, 1966–67
- Runners-up (3) 1963–64, 1965–66, 1967–68

Cupa României – Hunedoara County

- Winners (1): 2012–13
- Runners-up (1): 2018–19

=== Other performances ===
- Appearances in Liga I: 1

== Club Officials ==
=== Board of directors ===
Role	Name
Owner	(Romania) Brad Municipality
President	(Romania) Radu Filipaș

=== Current technical staff ===
Role	Name
Manager	(Romania) Mihai Leaha
Goalkeeping coach	(Romania) Mircea Bogdan

== League history ==
Season	Tier	Division	Place	Notes	Cupa României
2026–27	4	Liga IV (HD)	TBD		
2025–26	4	Liga IV (HD)	5th		
2024–25	4	Liga IV (HD)	3rd		
2023–24	4	Liga IV (HD)	2nd		First Round
2022–23	3	Liga III (Seria VII)	9th	Relegated	
2021–22	3	Liga III (Seria VII)	8th		
2020–21	4	Liga IV (HD)	1st (C)	Promoted	
2019–20	4	Liga IV (HD)	3rd		
2018–19	4	Liga IV (HD)	4th		
2017–18	4	Liga IV (HD)	7th		
2016–17	4	Liga IV (HD)	6th		
2015–16	4	Liga IV (HD)	5th		
2014–15	4	Liga IV (HD)	7th		
2013–14	4	Liga IV (HD)	9th		
2012–13	4	Liga IV (HD)	7th		
2011–12	4	Liga IV (HD)	2nd		
2010–11	4	Liga IV (HD)	4th		
2009–10	4	Liga IV (HD)	2nd		
2008–09	4	Liga IV (HD)	2nd		
2004–05	3	Divizia C (Seria VII)	8th	Relegated	
2003–04	3	Divizia C (Seria VII)	6th		
2002–03	3	Divizia C (Seria VI)	6th		
2001–02	3	Divizia C (Seria IV)	16th		
2000–01	3	Divizia C (Seria IV)	8th		
1999–00	3	Divizia C (Seria IV)	10th		
1998–99	3	Divizia C (Seria III)	15th		
1997–98	4	Divizia D (HD)	1st (C)	Promoted	
1996–97	4	Divizia D (HD)	1st (C)		
1995–96	4	Divizia D (HD)	7th		
1994–95	4	Divizia D (HD)	2nd		
1992–93	4	Divizia D (HD)	9th		
1991–92	3	Divizia C (Seria XI)	7th	Relegated	
1990–91	2	Divizia B (Seria III)	17th	Relegated	

Season	Tier	Division	Place	Notes	Cupa României
1989–90	3	Divizia C (Seria X)	1st (C)	Promoted	
1988–89	3	Divizia C (Seria IX)	5th		
1987–88	3	Divizia C (Seria X)	3rd		
1986–87	2	Divizia B (Seria III)	15th	Relegated	
1985–86	2	Divizia B (Seria III)	5th		
1984–85	2	Divizia B (Seria III)	4th		
1983–84	2	Divizia B (Seria III)	7th		
1982–83	2	Divizia B (Seria III)	11th		
1981–82	2	Divizia B (Seria III)	3rd		
1980–81	2	Divizia B (Seria III)	5th		
1979–80	2	Divizia B (Seria III)	5th		
1978–79	2	Divizia B (Seria III)	5th		
1977–78	2	Divizia B (Seria III)	9th		
1976–77	2	Divizia B (Seria III)	6th		
1975–76	3	Divizia C (Seria VIII)	1st (C)	Promoted	
1974–75	3	Divizia C (Seria IX)	4th		
1973–74	3	Divizia C (Seria IX)	3rd		
1972–73	3	Divizia C (Seria IX)	5th		
1971–72	3	Divizia C (Seria VIII)	8th		
1970–71	3	Divizia C (Seria VI)	7th		
1969–70	3	Divizia C (Seria VI)	12th		
1968–69	3	Divizia C (Seria VI)	4th		
1958–59	3	Divizia C (Seria VI)	3rd	Lost the play-off	Quarter-finals
1957–58	3	Divizia C (Seria III)	4th		
1950	2	Divizia B (Seria II)	12th	Relegated	
1948–49	2	Divizia B (Seria II)	6th		
1947–48	2	Divizia B (Seria III)	3rd		
1946–47	2	Divizia B (Seria III)	9th		
1942–43	World War II				Round of 32
1941–42	World War II				Semi-finals
1940–41	1	Divizia A	5th		Round of 32
1939–40	2	Divizia B (Seria II)	1st (C)	Promoted	
1937–38	3	Divizia C (West Seria II)	2nd		Round of 16
1936–37	3	Divizia C (West)	4th		

== Former managers ==
- (Romania) Ion "Ale" Popescu (1934–1935)
- (Romania) László Raffinsky (1950)
- (Romania) Vasile Gain (1957–1960)
- (Romania) Ladislau Băcuț (1963–1967)
- (Romania) Ladislau Vlad (1979–1981)
- (Romania) Ion V. Ionescu (1983–1984)
- (Romania) Ioan Petcu (2004)
- (Romania) Ioan Petcu (2021–2023)
- (Romania) Zoltan Crișan
