= Petre Ivan (footballer, born 1927) =

Romanian footballer (born 1927)

Personal information
- Date of birth: 1927
- Place of birth: Romania
- Position: Goalkeeper

Senior career*
| Years | Team | Apps | (Gls) |
| 1942–1948 | FC Ploiești (Note: The Divizia A 1940–41 was the last season before World War II and the Divizia A 1946–47 was the first one after, so the appearances and goals scored during this period for FC Ploiești are not official, also the statistics for the 1946–47 Divizia B season are unavailable.) | 24 | (0) |
| 1948–1950 | Dinamo București | 41 | (0) |
| 1951 | Dinamo Brașov | 8 | (0) |
| 1952–1955 | Flacăra Ploiești (Note: The statistics for the 1953, 1954 and 1955 Divizia B seasons are unavailable.) | 11 | (0) |
| 1956 | Energia Hunedoara | 7 | (0) |
| Total | | 91 | (0) |

International career
| 1949 | Romania | 1 | (0) |
- * Club domestic league appearances and goals

Petre Ivan (born 1927) was a Romanian football goalkeeper.

== International career ==
Petre Ivan played one game for Romania in a friendly which ended with a 4–1 victory against Albania.

== Honours ==
FC Ploiești

- Divizia B: 1946–47
