= CA Timișoara =

Romanian football club

- Full name: Club Atletic Timișoara
- Short name: CAT
- Founded: April 26, 1902
- Dissolved: 1936
Home colours	Away colours

Club Atletic Timișoara, known as CA Timișoara or simply CAT, was a football club from Timișoara. The team was founded in 1902 under the name Temesvári Football Club, later becoming Temesvári Atletikai Club, when the city was part of the Austro-Hungarian Empire.

After World War I, it competed under the name CA Timișoara in the leagues of the Kingdom of Romania. Throughout its history, Club Atletic Timișoara never played in Romania's top football division but reached the Round of 16 of the Cupa României on two occasions. In 1936, CAT merged with local rivals RGM Timișoara to form CAM Timișoara, and the club was subsequently dissolved.

== History ==
In the Józsefváros neighborhood of Temesvár, Kingdom of Hungary, Austria-Hungary, on April 26, 1902, as a result of initiative of a group of young people led by dr. Péter Dobroszláv, in one of the halls of the City Report House, Elite Palace (the building of the current restaurant Sinaia), Temesvár Football Club (TFC) was established. The chosen colors were white and green. The club had 30 members, and was run by president dr. Adalbert Meskó, vice-president Rudolf Trinksz and Viktor Kovács.

In 1913, the club won the Temesvár District Championship with the following team: Drexler – Löbl, Soma, Scholmanski, Aichiger, Rausberger – Franz, Bauer, Weinberger, Molnár II, Molnár I.

After World War I the city became part of Romania, and so the club name was changed to Clubul Atletic Timișoara (CAT). It became the first club dedicated exclusively to football in present-day Romania. The team regularly participates at the Timișoara District Championship, starting with the autumn of 1921. Players used during the 1921–27 period numbered a lot of known internationals, such as: Zimmermann, Kozovits, Holz, Raffinski.

At the end of the 1925–26 season, CA Timișoara finished in 2nd place, missing out on qualification for the national championship final tournament following a dispute. CAT had defeated Chinezul Timișoara and accumulated 26 points, holding a one-point lead over their rivals. However, Chinezul filed a protest, accusing CAT of fielding two allegedly ineligible players. The commission ruled that the match should be replayed and scheduled it on a weekday. CA Timișoara did not show up, arguing that their amateur players could not play during the week, and the victory was awarded to Chinezul.

In the 1926–27 season, under the guidance of Austrian coach Tony Cargnelli, the team finished in 5th place, with Cargnelli also coaching Politehnica Timișoara at the same time. This was followed by a 6th-place finish in the 1927–28 season, another 2nd-place finish in the 1928–29 season, and a 4th-place finish in the 1929–30 season. Starting with the 1930–31 season, CA Timișoara competed in the Banat District Championship, which was included in the newly established West League, finishing 3rd, and then 6th in the 1931–32 season.

In 1934, CA wins the West League, using the following players: Konrad – Havas, Zarkoczy – Iania, Kohn, Faragó – Cărăbuș, Korony, Possak, Molnár, Somogy and plays a double play-off match to promote to the Divizia A against România Cluj. Although it won the first match, CA lost the rematch – set after a litigation – and instead of playing in the Divizia A, it played in the first season of the Divizia B. The that season of the Divizia B, finishes 3rd in the Seria II. The next season RGM finishes 4th. Team used: Gervin – Gerber, Hajdu – Pokomy, Weidle, Morawetz – Seceni, Tóth, Stepan, Jánosi, Reuter.

In the summer of 1936, CA Timișoara disappeared after a merger with RGM Timișoara, the new team being named CAM Timișoara.

== Notable former players ==
- (Romania) Francisc Zimmermann
- (Romania) Alexandru Kozovits
- (Romania) Iacob Holz
- (Romania) László Raffinsky
