= Stadionul Aurul =

Sports arena in Romania

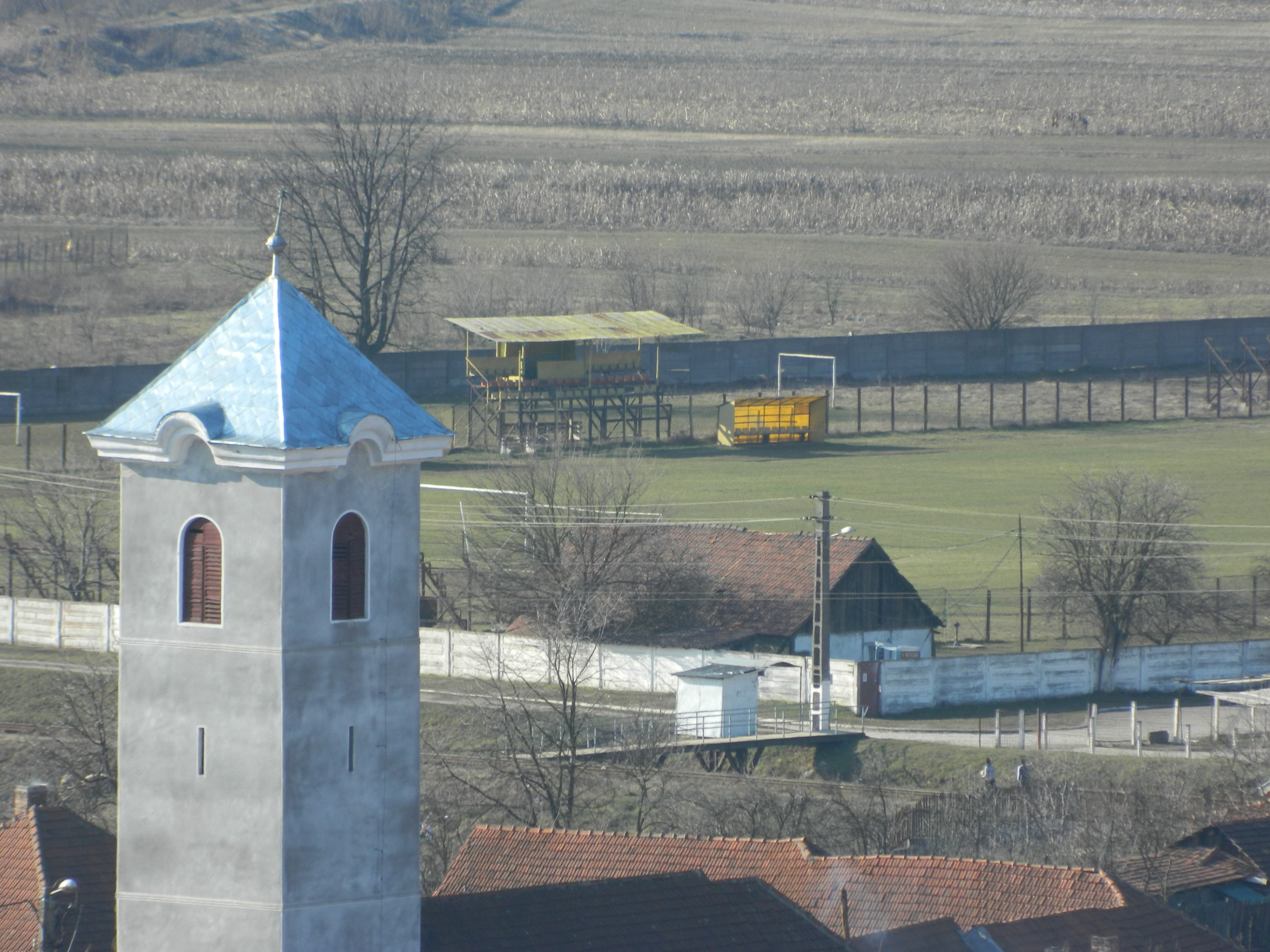
- Location: Brad, Romania
- Owner: Brad Municipality
- Capacity: 1,500
- Surface: grass

Construction
- Opened: 1930

Tenant
- Aurul Brad (1934–present)

Stadionul Aurul is a multi-use stadium in Brad, Romania. It is used mostly for football matches and is the home ground of Aurul Brad. The stadium holds 1,500 people.
