= Francisc Zimmermann =

Romanian footballer

Personal information
- Date of birth: 7 May 1897
- Place of birth: Timișoara
- Date of death: Unknown
- Position: Defender

Senior career*
| Years | Team | Apps | (Gls) |
| 1920–1925 | CA Timișoara | | |

International career
| 1922–1924 | Romania | 2 | (0) |
- * Club domestic league appearances and goals

Francisc Zimmermann (born 7 May 1897, date of death unknown) was a Romanian footballer. He competed in the men's tournament at the 1924 Summer Olympics.
