= Nicolae Munteanu (footballer) =

Romanian footballer

Personal information
- Date of birth: 1910
- Position: Defender

Senior career*
| Years | Team | Apps | (Gls) |
| 1934–1936 | România Cluj | | |

International career
| 1935 | Romania | 1 | (0) |
- * Club domestic league appearances and goals

Nicolae Munteanu (born 1910, date of death unknown) was a Romanian footballer who played as a defender.

== International career ==
Nicolae Munteanu played one friendly match for Romania, on 19 June 1935 under coach Constantin Rădulescu in a 4–0 loss against Bulgaria at the 1935 Balkan Cup.
