= Stadionul CMC =

Romanian stadium

- Stadionul TCI
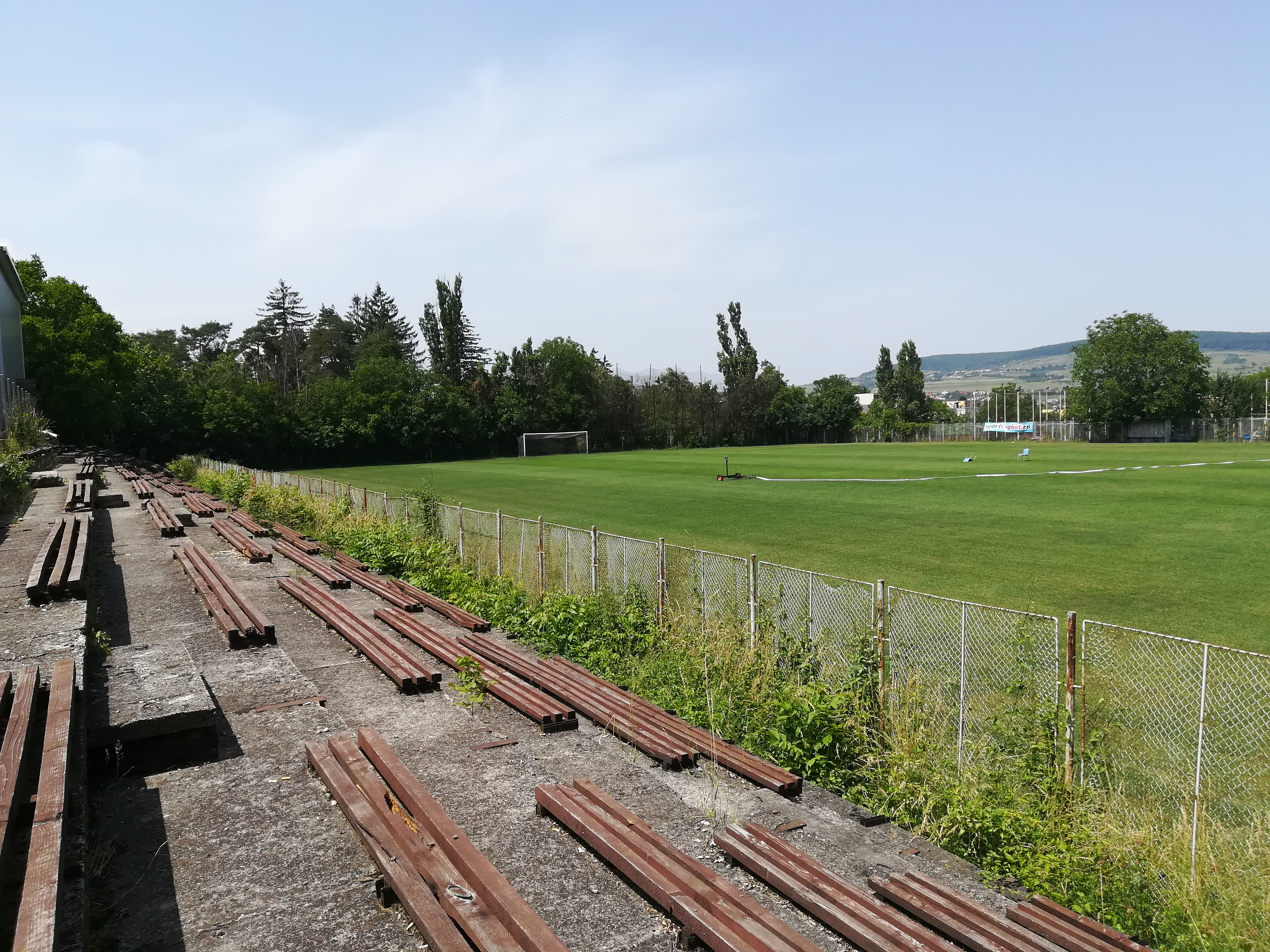
- Interactive map of Stadionul CMC
- Address: Str. Augustin Bunea, nr. 1
- Location: Cluj-Napoca, Romania
- Coordinates: 46°46′30.8″N 23°34′34.5″E
- Owner: S.C. Ardeal Construct S.R.L.
- Operator: CFR Cluj
- Capacity: 3,000
- Surface: Grass

Construction
- Opened: 1970

Tenants
- CMC Cluj; CFR II Cluj (2011–2020)

Stadionul CMC, also known as Stadionul TCI, is a multi-use stadium in Cluj-Napoca, Romania. It is used mostly for football matches and is the home ground of CFR Cluj Academy. The stadium holds 3,000 people and is also used for CFR Cluj's youth center squads matches and training.
