= Dacia Vasile Alecsandri Galați =

- Full name: Dacia Vasile Alecsandri Galați
- Founded: 1922
- Dissolved: 1950
- Ground: Dunărea, Galați
Home colours	Away colours

Dacia Vasile Alecsandri Galaţi (also Dacia VA Galaţi or DVA Galaţi) was a Romanian football club based in Galaţi, founded in 1922 and dissolved in 1950. This club advanced to the Romanian Football Championships three times and was a quarter-finalist in the Romanian Cup.

== History ==
DVA Galati was founded in 1922 when two clubs, Soimii Dacia and Liceul Vasile Alecsandri, named after a Roman province and a poet, respectively merged. The club made its first appearance in the regionals in 1927 and qualified for the final round of the Romanian championship. They went on to lose to Colţea Braşov and, a year later, to Olympia Bucharest. However, in 1929, the team prevailed in the first round against Victoria Iaşi and advanced to the quarter-finals. There, they defeated Dragoş Vodă Cernăuţi 1–0.

In the following years, DVA didn't enjoy such success, failing to qualify for regionals. In 1932, when the Divizia A was established, DVA was excluded. With the introduction of Divizia B, two years later, the club took part in the national league. The club continued to participate until gaming operations were put on hiatus in 1941 due to World War II. It enjoyed its greatest success during the 1938–39 season, when it finished second in the North East division.

DVA had greater success as the League celebrated it in the Romanian Cup. There, the club moved twice into the first knockout round. In the 1935–36 season it lost to Gloria Arad 0–6. In 1938–39 it was defeated by the eventual winners FC Rapid București with the same results, having previously prevailed against the first division club Victoria Cluj.

After World War II, DVA Galati played in one more local championship before disappearing in 1950.

== Achievements ==
- Quarterfinals at the Romanian Football Championship: 1928–29
- Round of 16 of the Romanian Cup: 1935–36, 1938–39
