= Alexandru Kozovits =

Romanian footballer

Personal information
- Date of birth: 3 September 1899
- Place of birth: Temesvár, Austria-Hungary
- Position: Defender

Youth career
- 1913–1921: Temesvár FC

Senior career*
| Years | Team | Apps | (Gls) |
| 1921–1922 | CA Timișoara | | |
| 1922–1923 | Unirea Timișoara | | |
| 1923–1929 | CA Timișoara | | |

International career
| 1922–1934 | Romania | 3 | (1) |
- * Club domestic league appearances and goals

Alexandru Kozovits (Hungarian: Kozovits Sándor) (born 3 September 1899, date of death unknown) was a Romanian footballer of Hungarian ethnicity. He competed in the men's tournament at the 1924 Summer Olympics.
