= Iacob Holz =

Romanian footballer

Personal information
- Full name: Iacob Alexandru Holz
- Date of birth: 1901
- Date of death: Unknown
- Position: Striker

Senior career*
Years	Team	Apps	(Gls)
1920–1923	CA Timișoara		
1923–1924	Unirea Timișoara		
1924–1926	CA Timișoara		

International career
1924	Romania	1	(0)
- * Club domestic league appearances and goals

Iacob Alexandru Holz (born 1901, date of death unknown) was a Romanian football striker. Iacob Holz played only game at international level for Romania was a 1924 friendly which ended with a 4–1 loss against Austria. He was also part of Romania's 1924 Summer Olympics squad.
