= Elpis Constanța =

Romanian football club

Elpis Constanţa
- Full name: Clubul de Fotbal Elpis Constanţa
- Short name: Elpis(Hope)
- Founded: 1915; 110 years ago; 1999; 26 years ago
- Owner: Anton Hiropedi
- League: Liga IV
- Website: https://elpis.ro/despre-comunitatea-elpis/clubul-de-fotbal-elpis/

Fotbal Club Elpis Constanța, commonly known as Elpis Constanța, or simply as Elpis, is a Romanian professional football club based in Constanța, Constanța County. It plays in the Liga IV.

== History ==
The team was founded in 1915, being one of the oldest clubs in Romania. The first field was located on the banks of the Black Sea by the Greek Church. The team played in the first three national leagues of Romania until 1957, when the club dissolved.

42 years after the club was disbanded, in 1999, the club reappears in Constanta as a private club under the leadership on Anton Hiropedi, as a club who wants to develop the young talents.

After two finals lost in Cupa Danone, in 2002 and 2003, finally in 2004 the club wins the trophy. Next year the club wins the national championship, youth league, defeating Gloria Arad in the final with 1-0.

The colors of the team are blue and black.

== Honours ==
Danone Cup

Winners (1): 2004

Runners-up (2): 2002, 2003

Youth League

Champions (1): 2005
