= Tricolor Ploiești =

- Full name: Tricolor Ploiești
- Short name: Tricolor
- Founded: 1921
- Dissolved: 1974
| Home colours | Away colours |

Tricolor Ploiești was a Romanian football club based in Ploiești, Prahova County, founded in 1921 and dissolved in 1974. Throughout its history, the club underwent several name changes, including Tricolor, Tricolor CFPV, FC Ploiești, CFR Ploiești, Locomotiva CFR Ploiești, and Vagonul Ploiești, and participated in five seasons in the top flight of Romanian football between 1932 and 1948.

== History ==
=== Early history (1921–1941) ===
The club was founded in 1921 as Tricolor Ploiești by several prominent local figures, including Constantin Zagoritz, who served as the club’s first president, Ilie Gheorghiu, Jan Vasopol, Nicu Stambolgiu, and composer Elly Roman.

Initially, the team competed in the Ploiești District Championship, gradually establishing a presence in regional football. In the 1927–28 season, Tricolor won the District Championship and qualified for the National Championship, where it was narrowly defeated 1–2 by Olympia Bucharest in the first round.

The club repeated its district success the following season, earning a place in the National Stage once again, but lost 0–1 to Venus București in the opening round. In the 1929–30 season, Tricolor won the District Championship for the third time in four years and advanced to the National Stage. After a 1–0 win over Victoria Constanța in the first round, the team was eliminated by Juventus București following a 1–2 defeat in the second round. The lineup used during this period included Botez, Lang, Gh. Dragomirescu, Anastasescu, M. Popescu, Șerbănescu, Stavrescu, Antonescu, Lae Dumitrescu, Frunzulescu, and T. Ionescu.

In the 1931–32 season, Tricolor won the district title again. Following the introduction of the national league system in 1932, the club qualified for the inaugural season of Divizia A. Competing in Group I, Tricolor finished 5th in the 1932–33 season and 8th in 1933–34, after which it was relegated to the newly formed Divizia B.

The basic lineup during this first league era featured Cristescu – Dunăreanu, Gh. Dragomirescu – Anastasescu, Schwartz, Grün – M. Dumitrescu, Oane Stănescu, Spirea, F. Ștefănescu, and M. Rădulescu. The squad also included Cristodorescu, Gohn, M. Popescu, Alexandru Ionescu, Constantinescu, Lang, V. Dumitrescu, Simionescu, and Georgescu.

In the next two seasons, Tricolorul competed in Series I of Divizia B, placing 8th in 1934–35 and 5th in 1935–36. In 1936, the club merged with CFPV (Căile Ferate Ploiești–Văleni) and adopted the name Tricolor CFPV. After finishing 9th in the East Series in 1936–37, the team topped Series I in 1937–38, earning promotion to Divizia A. However, their return to the top tier was short-lived, as they were relegated after just one season, finishing 11th out of 12 under the leadership of Rudolf Wetzer.

In 1939, the club changed its name to FC Ploiești. During the 1939–40 season, it once again secured promotion by winning Series I and managed to finish 10th in the 1940–41 Divizia A season. Soon after, national competitions were suspended due to the outbreak of World War II.

Among the notable players during the late 1930s and early 1940s were Schrameck, Iordăchescu, Neagu, Dunăreanu, I. Lupaș, Pop, Miscoltz, E. Lakatos, Spirea, Dobra, Marienuț, Mosko, N. Kovács, I. Kovács, Bocșa, E. Kocsis, Galiș, P. Malița, Antonescu, Bărbulescu, and Stanislau Bartunek.

=== Post-war years and decline (1946–1963) ===
In the post-war period, FC Ploiești resumed its activity in the 1946–47 season of the second division, earning promotion to the top tier by winning Series II. The team fielded during this campaign included: P. Ivan, Belesnay, Șt. Neagu, E. Kocsis, Comănescu, I. Morava, Aștilean, Bădin, Antonescu, Al. Georgescu, P. Malița, and Palfi. However, the club finished 13th in the 1947–48 Divizia A season, resulting in relegation.

In 1948, following the rise of the communist regime and the requirement for all sports associations to align with trade unions or state institutions, the club was absorbed into CFR Ploiești, a team founded in 1945. In the 1948–49 Divizia B season, CFR Ploiești ranked 11th in Series I and was relegated to the Prahova District Championship. The squad during this period included: Popa, Teodorescu, Ștefan Neagu, Reiss, Marinoiu, Matroc, Comănescu II, Emil Vlaiculescu, Ionescu, Ion Morava, Ion Vasilescu, Ștefan Cătescu, Dumitru Bonaciu, Anton, Blătoiu, Alexandru Georgescu, Adalbert Bocșa, Traian Luchian, Iliescu, and Petru Malița.

Following relegation from Divizia B, the team continued under the name Locomotiva CFR Ploiești from the spring of 1950, competing in Categoria I of the Ploiești District Championship, the top tier of district-level football in Prahova. Despite setbacks, the club persevered and won the Ploiești City Championship in 1952. After a play-off, the team earned promotion to the top tier of the Ploiești Regional Championship, finishing 2nd in Series A in the 1953 season. However, a reorganization of the competition sent the club back to city-level football, where it played for six more years.

In 1959, following a successful promotion play-off and an increase in the number of regional series, the team returned to the Regional Championship for the 1959–60 season. Unfortunately, in the following campaign, the club finished 11th in Series II and was relegated to the District Championships.

=== The Vagonul era (1963–1974) ===
In 1963, the club was renamed Vagonul Ploiești competed under the management of Nicolae Topșa and included players such as Radu, Mărgărit, Tache, Simion, Enache, and Ion Ionescu I in Ploiești City District Championship. Vagonul won the Ploiești City Championship in 1963–64 and again in 1964–65, earning a return to the top regional level following an expansion of the league.

Vagonul, with Dumitru Stoicescu as club president and Alexandru Fronea as head coach, became the first champion of the Prahova County Championship in the 1968–69 season, following the reorganization of the Romanian football league system. In the promotion play-offs, the team drew twice with CFR Roșiori (1–1 in both legs) before winning a decisive third match in Bucharest, 2–1 after extra time. However, in the final play-off round, Vagonul was eliminated by Metalul Colibași (0–2 away, 0–0 home). The squad featured players such as Bujor Scorțeanu, Stelian Tănase, Ion Mărgărit, Ion Radu, Tăuț, Simion, Al. Dumitru, Gh. Dinu, Enache, Ion Matei, Teodor Selișcan, Burghiu, Mayer, Marin Vlad, Lucian Dumitrescu I, Aurel Dinuță, Vasile Pîrvu, Nicolae Stoica, Mircea Coadă, Nicolae Dumitrescu II, Gheorghe Alexe, Ion Sandu, Ion Popescu, Gh. Serebreanu, Ion Negoiță, Costache, and Ion Sandu.

This was followed by a 6th-place finish in 1969–70, 2nd place in 1970–71, 4th place in 1971–72, and once again 2nd place in 1972–73. In 1973, the club briefly adopted the name Tricolor Ploiești and, led by Petre Ivan as head coach, finished once again in 2nd place in 1973–74 season before merging in 1974 with IUC Ploiești. Following this merger, the club disappeared from Romanian football.

== Honours ==
Liga II:

- Winners (3): 1937–38, 1939–40, 1946–47

Ploiești District Championship

- Winners (4): 1927–28, 1928–29, 1929–30, 1931–32

Prahova County Championship

- Winners (1): 1968–69
- Runners-up (3): 1970–71, 1972–73, 1973–74

== Notable former players ==
The footballers mentioned below have played at least 1 season for Tricolor Ploiești and also played in Divizia A for another team.

- (Romania) Petre Ivan
- (Romania) Elemér Kocsis
- (Romania) Nicolae Kovács
- (Romania) Eugen Lakatos
- (Romania) Ioan Lupaș

== Former managers ==
- (Romania) Rudolf Wetzer (1938–1939)
- (Romania) Elemér Kocsis (1948–1950)
- (Romania) Manole Rădulescu (1951)
- (Romania) Alexandru Fronea (1968–1969)
- (Romania) Petre Ivan (1973–1974)
