= Franco-Româna Brăila =

Romanian football team

- Full name: AS Brăilița 1928 Franco-Româna Brăila
- Founded: 1928; 98 years ago 2022; 4 years ago (refounded)
- Ground: Stadionul Progresul, Brăila
- Capacity: 2000
Home colours	Away colours

Franco-Româna Brăila (AS Brăilița) is a football team from Brăila, Romania.

== History ==
Their best performance was reaching the Quarter-finals in Cupa României in the 1935–36 season when they lost 6–4 against Unirea Tricolor București.

Franco-Româna Brăila's second team was founded in 1940 and was called AS Brăilița.

Brăilița was also the neighbourhood and name of the stadium. The stadium resembled a small English stadium looking similar with the famous Highbury, but in a smaller size.

Even though they won the Divizia B twice they were never promoted to Divizia A, because they failed to win the promotion play-offs.

Their biggest rival was another local team Dacia Unirea Brăila. Franco-Româna Brăila was in the shadow of their rival team for all of their history.

After the club folded in 1948, another team was created in Brăila to replace them, called Progresul Brăila.

On 3 September 2022 the team was reestablished as AS Brăilița 1928 Franco-Româna. The team performs only in Brăila County competitions. The current coach is Nuțulescu Ionuț-Adrian.

== Honours ==
Liga II:

- Winners (2): 1935–36, 1939–40
- Runners-up (2): 1934–35, 1940–41

Quarter-finals in Cupa României (1): 1935–36

== Literature ==
- Hardy Grüne (2000), Enzyklopädie der europäischen Fußballvereine (in German) (1. ed.), Kassel: AGON Sportverlag, p. 337, ISBN 3-89784-163-0
