= FC Victoria Cluj =

Defunct Romanian football club

Victoria Cluj
- Full name: Victoria Cluj (historic club); Asociația Club Sportiv Supporter 2.0 (modern entity)
- Short name: Victoria
- Founded: 1920 (historic club); 2018 (modern entity)
- Dissolved: 1947 (historic club); 2022 (modern senior team ceased activity)
- Ground: Iclod (modern club)
- Capacity: 600
- 2021–22: Liga IV, Cluj County, 1st
| Home colours | Away colours |

Victoria Cluj was the name of a Romanian association football club from Cluj-Napoca, Cluj County, historically associated with the Mănăștur district. The original club was founded in 1920 and became one of the leading Romanian sides of the 1920s, finishing as national runners-up in 1921–22, 1922–23 and 1928–29. It competed as România Cluj between 1927 and the mid-1930s before returning to the Victoria name. The club ceased activity after the 1946–47 Divizia B season.

A separate club, ACS Supporter 2.0 Cluj-Napoca, was already competing in Liga IV Cluj in 2018–19. In the summer of 2019 a project using the FC Victoria Cluj identity was launched, while the team continued to appear in official county competition records under the Supporter 2.0 legal name. The modern side finished second in Liga IV Cluj in 2019–20 and 2020–21, then won both the county league and the Cluj County stage of the Cupa României in 2021–22. After losing the Liga III promotion play-off to Victoria Carei, Supporter 2.0 was provisionally disaffiliated by the Cluj County Football Association in August 2022.

== History ==
=== Old club (1920–1947) ===
Victoria Cluj was founded in 1920 in Mănăștur and was initially associated with students of the Commercial Academy in Cluj. Contemporary accounts and later histories describe it as the representative team of the Mănăștur district. During the interwar period the club was also supported for a time by the Romanian Army.

Names and identities
| Name | Period |
|---|---|
Historic club
| Victoria Cluj | 1920–1927 |
| România Cluj | 1927–1935 |
| Victoria Cluj | 1935–1947 |
Modern entity
| ACS Supporter 2.0 | 2018–2022 |
| FC Victoria Cluj identity | 2019–2022 |

Victoria entered the Romanian championship through the Cluj regional competition. In 1921–22 it won its regional section and reached the national final. After eliminating Stăruința Oradea and advancing past Tricolor București, Victoria met Chinezul Timișoara in the final at Timișoara and lost 1–5. The following season it again reached the final, defeating Înțelegerea Oradea and Venus București on the way, before losing 0–2 to Chinezul in Cluj.

Victoria finished second in the Cluj regional championship in both 1923–24 and 1924–25. It regained the regional title in 1925–26, finishing first with 30 points from 18 matches, but its national campaign ended in the preliminary round with a 1–3 defeat to AMEF Arad. The following season was considerably weaker, with Victoria finishing sixth in the Cluj championship.

The club was renamed România Cluj in 1927. It immediately won the Cluj regional championship in 1927–28, but was eliminated 0–2 by Jiul Lupeni in the national quarter-finals. România again won its regional competition in 1928–29. It advanced through the national tournament to a third championship final, beating Banatul Timișoara 3–0 in the semi-final before losing 2–3 to Venus București in Bucharest.

România finished second to Universitatea Cluj in the 1929–30 Cluj championship. The surviving records for 1930–31 are incomplete and only a partial table is available, with România leading after four recorded matches. In 1931–32, România and Universitatea both finished the available Cluj competition with nine points; Universitatea ranked first on goal average and România second. Both clubs were selected for the new nationwide Divizia Națională introduced for the following season.

România was placed in Series I for the first nationwide league season in 1932–33 and finished sixth of seven teams, retaining its place through the relegation play-off. It finished fifth in Series II in 1933–34 and sixth in the single-group championship in 1934–35.

The Victoria name returned for the 1935–36 season. The club finished tenth that year and fifth in 1936–37. Its best result in the divisional era came in 1937–38, when Victoria placed third in Group 1 with ten wins from eighteen matches. It then finished sixth in 1938–39 and twelfth in 1939–40, which resulted in relegation from Divizia A.

Victoria also had several notable Cupa României runs during the 1930s. It reached the quarter-finals in 1936–37 and the semi-finals in 1937–38, when it was eliminated 0–2 by CAM Timișoara. It reached another quarter-final in 1939–40. Earlier, under the România name, the club reached the Round of 16 in 1934–35.

The Second World War interrupted Victoria's regular participation in the Romanian national league system. Sources describing the club's history note that its activity was greatly reduced during the war. Victoria was again playing in Cluj by April 1945 and also faced Carmen București in a friendly in July of that year.

Victoria entered Divizia B for the first post-war national league season. It finished fourteenth and last in Series III, with four wins, three draws and nineteen defeats from 26 matches, scoring 26 goals and conceding 71. The club broke up after the season and did not enter the following championship.

=== New club (2018–2022) ===
The modern entity was ACS Supporter 2.0 Cluj-Napoca. Contrary to later reports which described the Victoria revival as a club founded in 2019, AJF Cluj records show that Supporter 2.0 was already playing in Liga IV Cluj from September 2018. The team finished the 2018–19 championship in twelfth place, with 27 points from 28 matches.

In August 2019, journalist Liviu Alexa announced a football project using the FC Victoria Cluj name and presented it as a revival of the historic Mănăștur identity. Marius Suller was appointed head coach. Contemporary reports called Victoria a newly created project, but official AJF records continued to list the competing club as ACS Supporter 2.0 rather than as the legal continuation of the club dissolved in 1947.

Supporter 2.0, also referred to by the FRF as Victoria Cluj, challenged for the 2019–20 county title. The regular competition was interrupted by the COVID-19 pandemic and the county champion was decided through an additional play-off. Supporter lost the decisive return match against Someșul Dej in the final minute and finished the season as county runner-up.

The 2020–21 Liga IV Cluj season was played in a shortened format with four teams. Supporter 2.0 and Academia de Fotbal Viitorul Cluj both finished with 16 points from seven matches, but Viitorul was ranked first and Supporter second on the competition's tiebreaking criteria. Their final meeting ended 3–3.

Supporter 2.0 won the 2021–22 Liga IV Cluj championship with 57 points from 24 matches, six points ahead of Arieșul Mihai Viteazu. The club also won the Cluj County stage of the Cupa României, drawing 0–0 with Arieșul in the final before winning the penalty shoot-out.

The county title qualified Supporter for the Liga III promotion play-off against Victoria Carei. The first leg at Iclod Arena ended 1–1 on 18 June 2022. Victoria Carei won the return leg 3–0 a week later and advanced 4–1 on aggregate.

Supporter 2.0 did not return for the 2022–23 county championship. On 24 August 2022, the executive committee of AJF Cluj approved the club's provisional disaffiliation. No later senior competition entry for Supporter 2.0 is recorded by the county association.

== Ground ==
The historic Victoria played its interwar home matches at Arena Astra in Cluj. The ground stood on the site later occupied by the Horia Demian Sports Hall.

The modern Supporter 2.0 side used several grounds in Cluj County. Iclod Arena was used for home matches during the 2021–22 season and hosted the first leg of the Liga III promotion play-off against Victoria Carei.

The development strategy published by Iclod Municipality describes Iclod Arena as having a FIFA-standard football pitch and stands with 600 spectator places, as well as changing rooms and an official box.

== Honours ==
=== Old club ===
Romanian Championship

- Runners-up (3): 1921–22, 1922–23, 1928–29

Cluj Regional Championship

- Winners (5): 1921–22, 1922–23, 1925–26, 1927–28, 1928–29

=== New club ===
Liga IV – Cluj County

- Winners (1): 2021–22
- Runners-up (2): 2019–20, 2020–21

Cupa României – Cluj County

- Winners (1): 2021–22

== League history ==
Before 1932, the Romanian championship was organised through regional leagues followed by a national knockout tournament. For those seasons, the table distinguishes the club's Cluj regional finish from its national-stage result.

| Season | Level | Division / competition | Place | National stage / notes | Cupa României |
|---|---|---|---|---|---|
Modern entity – ACS Supporter 2.0 / Victoria Cluj identity
| 2021–22 | 4 | Liga IV Cluj | 1st (C) | Lost Liga III promotion play-off, 1–4 on aggregate | County phase – Winners |
| 2020–21 | 4 | Liga IV Cluj | 2nd | 16 points from 7 matches; runners-up on tiebreakers | |
| 2019–20 | 4 | Liga IV Cluj | 2nd | Lost county championship decider to Someșul Dej | |
| 2018–19 | 4 | Liga IV Cluj | 12th | 27 points from 28 matches | |
Historic Victoria Cluj / România Cluj
| 1946–47 | 2 | Divizia B (Series III) | 14th | Club ceased activity after the season | — |
| 1940–46 | — | — | — | WW II. | — |
| 1939–40 | 1 | Divizia A | 12th (R) | Relegated | Quarter-finals |
| 1938–39 | 1 | Divizia A | 6th | | Round of 32 |
| 1937–38 | 1 | Divizia A | 3rd | Best divisional-era league finish | Semi-finals |
| 1936–37 | 1 | Divizia A | 5th | | Quarter-finals |
| 1935–36 | 1 | Divizia A | 10th | First season after return to the Victoria name | Round of 32 |
| 1934–35 | 1 | Divizia A | 6th | Competed as România Cluj | Round of 16 |
| 1933–34 | 1 | Divizia A | 5th | | Round of 32 |
| 1932–33 | 1 | Divizia A | 6th | Retained place after relegation play-off | — |
| 1931–32 | Regional | Cluj regional championship | 2nd | Selected for the new Divizia Națională | — |
| 1930–31 | Regional | Cluj regional championship | Incomplete records | Surviving source contains only a partial table | — |
| 1929–30 | Regional | Cluj regional championship | 2nd | | — |
| 1928–29 | Regional / National | Cluj regional championship | 1st (C) | Romanian Championship runners-up | — |
| 1927–28 | Regional / National | Cluj regional championship | 1st (C) | National quarter-finals | — |
| 1926–27 | Regional | Cluj regional championship | 6th | Did not qualify for national stage | — |
| 1925–26 | Regional / National | Cluj regional championship | 1st (C) | National preliminary round | — |
| 1924–25 | Regional | Cluj regional championship | 2nd | Did not qualify for national stage | — |
| 1923–24 | Regional | Cluj regional championship | 2nd | Did not qualify for national stage | — |
| 1922–23 | Regional / National | Cluj regional championship | 1st (C) | Romanian Championship runners-up | — |
| 1921–22 | Regional / National | Cluj regional championship | 1st (C) | Romanian Championship runners-up | — |

== Notable former players ==
The players below are among those recorded in historical Victoria or România Cluj squads and have standalone biographical articles.

- (Romania) Alexandru Chifor
- (Romania) Vasile Cipcigan
- (Romania) Andrei Criza
- (Romania) Iacob Felecan
- (Romania) Ioan Krieshoffer
- (Romania) Alexandru Leitner
- (Romania) Nicolae Munteanu
- (Romania) Gheorghe Mureșanu
- (Romania) Grațian Sepi
- (Romania) Andrei Sepci
