= CSC Crișul Sântandrei =

Romanian football club

Crișul Sântandrei
- Full name: Club Sportiv Comunal Crișul Sântandrei
- Nicknames: Alb-albaștrii (The White and Blues)
- Short name: Crișul
- Founded: 8 December 2009; 16 years ago
- Ground: Crișul
- Capacity: 500
- Owner: Sântandrei Commune
- Chairman: Sorin Rădeanu
- Manager: Gheorghe Ghiț
- League: Liga III
- 2025–26: Liga III, Seria VIII, 5th
Home colours	Away colours

Club Sportiv Comunal Crișul Sântandrei, commonly known as Crișul Sântandrei, or simply as Sântandrei, is a Romanian football club based in Sântandrei, Bihor County, currently playing in the Liga III.

Crișul Sântandrei was founded on in 2009 to continue the tradition of the old local football club, Recolta Sântandrei. Crișul played for most of its existence at the amateur level, in the Liga IV, after its promotion from Liga V, in 2011. The team was known at local level for its notable results, but also for its bad luck, finishing five times in the 2nd place, and earning the nickname "the white and blues."

Its location, in the Oradea metropolitan area, ensured in the last decade a fast grow for the commune of Sântandrei, demographic and financial. Finally, Crișul won Liga IV Bihor at the end of the 2022–23 season, breaking the 2nd place curse. This county title was the first for Crișul, but also for the commune of Sântandrei, even its predecessor, Recolta, did not achieve this performance.

== History ==
Crișul Sântandrei was founded on 8 December 2009, initially to continue the local football tradition, started by Recolta Sântandrei back in the 1970s. However, until 2023, the team played only at the amateur level. In 2010, Crișul was enrolled in the fifth tier (Liga V) and was promoted after only one season, upon winning a tough battle against CS Mădăras and Olimpia Salonta. The followed a successuful first season at county level, where it ranked 2nd and won the regional round of Cupa României.

In the following seasons, the team based in Sântandrei occupied places in the first half of the league table and were runners-up for another four times (2013, 2015, 2018 and 2022). Crișul had also good results in the regional round of Cupa României, winning the trophy again, in 2022. The team finally won the county league at the end 2022–23 season, breaking the 2nd place curse. This county title was the first for Crișul, but also for the commune of Sântandrei, even its predecessor, Recolta, did not achieve this performance. For the promotion to Liga III, Crișul had to face Liga IV Cluj champions, Arieșul Mihai Viteazu and won the double, 5–4 on aggregate.

== Grounds ==
Crișul Sântandrei plays its home matches on Crișul Stadium in Sântandrei, with a capacity of 500 seats.

== Honours ==
- Liga IV – Bihor County
  - Winners (1): 2022–23
  - Runners-up (5): 2011–12, 2012–13, 2014–15, 2017–18, 2021–22
- Liga V – Bihor County
  - Winners (1): 2010–11
- Cupa României – Bihor County
  - Winners (2): 2011–12, 2021–22
  - Runners-up (2): 2013–14, 2014–15

== Players ==
=== First team squad ===
As of 12 January 2026

Note: Flags indicate national team as defined under FIFA eligibility rules; some limited exceptions apply. Players may hold more than one non-FIFA nationality.

No.	Pos.	Nation	Player
2	MF	ROU	Balázs Halász (on loan from LPS Bihorul)
3	DF	ROU	Răzvan Pașcalău
4	DF	CMR	Ntchinda Cahill
5	DF	ROU	Bogdan Maftei (on loan from LPS Bihorul)
6	DF	ROU	Valentin Haica (on loan from LPS Bihorul)
7	FW	ROU	Casian Cirtea
8	MF	ROU	Mădălin Popa (captain)
9	FW	ROU	Robert Popescu (vice-captain)
10	MF	ROU	Vlad Costea
11	MF	ROU	Denis Rusu
12	GK	ROU	Eduard Nergheș
14	DF	ROU	Damian Hașaș (on loan from Lotus)
15	MF	ROU	Mihnea Moș (on loan from LPS Bihorul)

No.	Pos.	Nation	Player
16	MF	ROU	David Maghiar
17	MF	ROU	Paul Acatrinei (on loan from LPS Bihorul)
18	DF	ROU	Dario Bora
19	DF	ROU	Sebastian Gondor
20	MF	ROU	Antonio Zghibolț (on loan from LPS Bihorul)
21	MF	ROU	Alexandru Brisc
23	MF	ROU	Andrei Hosu
26	MF	ROU	Ștefan Gabor (on loan from LPS Bihorul)
28	DF	CMR	Yvan Ndiesse
33	GK	ROU	Iulian Anca-Trip (3rd captain)
—	DF	ROU	Márk Kovács
—	MF	ROU	Alexandru Blidar

=== Out on loan ===
Note: Flags indicate national team as defined under FIFA eligibility rules; some limited exceptions apply. Players may hold more than one non-FIFA nationality.

No. / Pos. / Nation / Player	No. / Pos. / Nation / Player

== Club Officials ==
=== Board of directors ===
Role	Name
Owner	(Romania) Sântandrei Commune
President	(Romania) Sorin Rădeanu
Sporting director	(Romania) Sebastian Achim
Team manager	(Romania) Florin Marian

=== Current technical staff ===
Role	Name
Manager	(Romania) Gheorghe Ghiț
Assistant coach	(Romania) Cristian Oroș
Goalkeeping coach	(Romania) Dragoș Săvescu
Fitness coach	(Romania) Alin Pintea
Club doctor	(Romania) Nicu Buciuman
Kinetotherapist	(Romania) Christian Boczonyi

== Notable former players ==
The footballers enlisted below have had international cap(s) for their respective countries at junior and/or senior level and/or more than 50 caps for CSC Crișul Sântandrei.

- (Romania) Zeno Bundea
- (Romania) Ciprian Dianu

== Notable former managers ==
- (Romania) Ciprian Dianu

== League history ==
Season	Tier	Division	Place	Notes	Cupa României
2025–26	3	Liga III (Seria VIII)	TBD		
2024–25	3	Liga III (Seria X)	4th		
2023–24	3	Liga III (Seria X)	4th		
2022–23	4	Liga IV (BH)	1st (C)	Promoted	First Round
2021–22	4	Liga IV (BH)	2nd		
2020–21	4	Liga IV (BH)	–	Cancelled	
2019–20	4	Liga IV (BH)	3rd		
2018–19	4	Liga IV (BH)	5th		

Season	Tier	Division	Place	Notes	Cupa României
2017–18	4	Liga IV (BH)	2nd		
2016–17	4	Liga IV (BH)	4th		
2015–16	4	Liga IV (BH)	3rd		
2014–15	4	Liga IV (BH)	2nd		
2013–14	4	Liga IV (BH)	4th		
2012–13	4	Liga IV (BH)	2nd		First Round
2011–12	4	Liga IV (BH)	2nd		
2010–11	5	Liga V (BH)	1st (C)	Promoted	
