= Stadionul Crișul (Sântandrei) =

Sports venue in Sântandrei, Romania

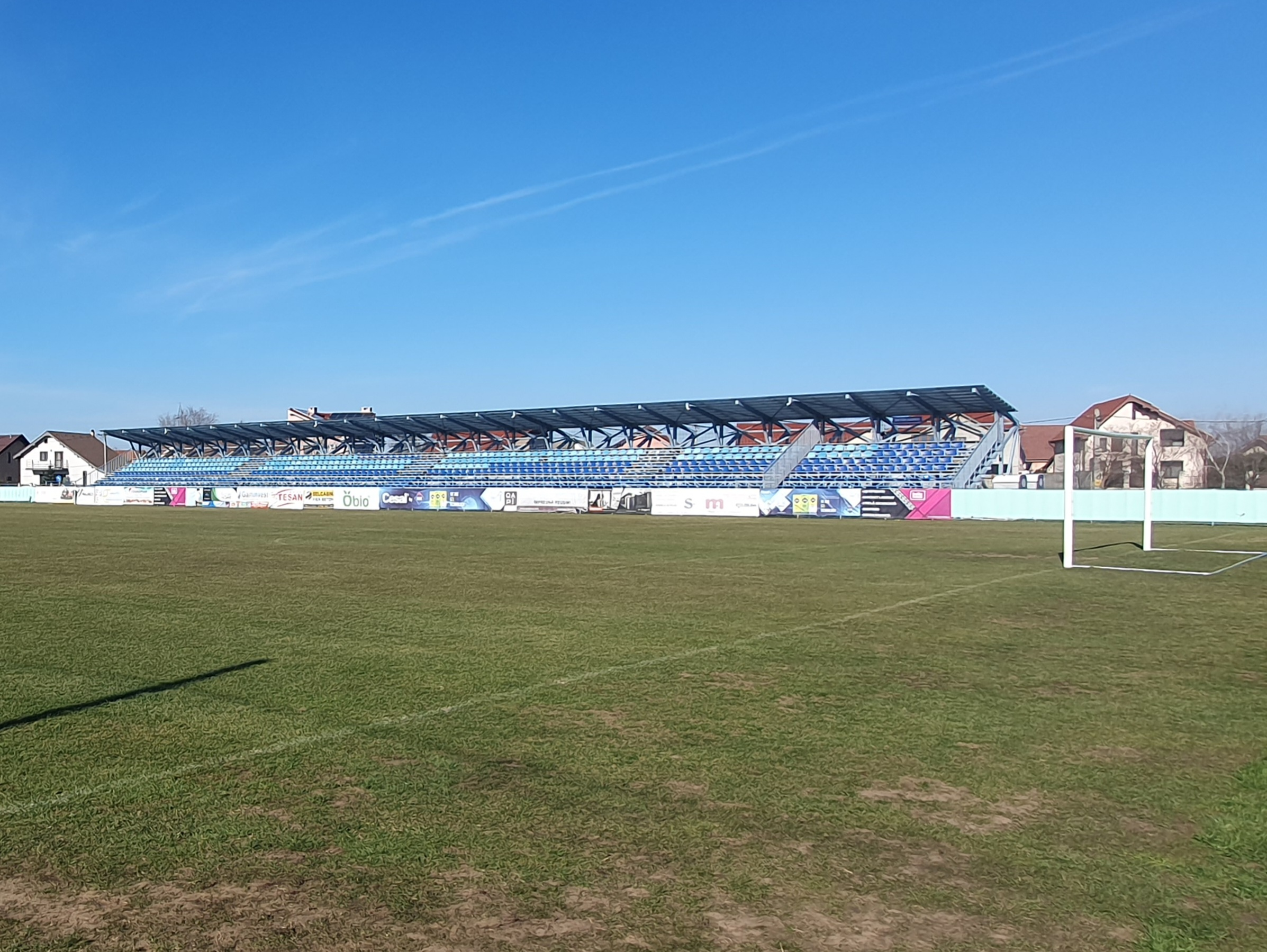
- Interactive map of Stadionul Crișul
- Address: Str. Stadionului, nr. 2
- Location: Sântandrei, Romania
- Coordinates: 47°04′11.3″N 21°50′46.5″E
- Owner: Commune of Sântandrei
- Operator: Crișul Sântandrei
- Capacity: 500 (all seated)
- Surface: Grass

Construction
- Opened: 1970s
- Renovated: 2008, 2013, 2023

Tenants
- Recolta Sântandrei (1970–2000); Crișul Sântandrei (2009–present)

Stadionul Crișul is a multi-purpose stadium in Sântandrei, Romania. It is currently used mostly for football matches, is the home ground of Crișul Sântandrei and has a capacity of 500 people.
