= Ciprian Dianu =

Romanian footballer (born 1977)

Personal information
- Full name: Ciprian Virgil Dianu
- Date of birth: 13 January 1977 (age 49)
- Place of birth: Reșița, Romania
- Height: 1.80 m (5 ft 11 in)
- Positions: Defender; midfielder

Team information
- Current team: Diosig Bihardiószeg (assistant)

Senior career*
Years	Team	Apps	(Gls)
1995	Gloria Bistriţa	5	(1)
1995–1996	Bihor Oradea	14	(0)
1997	Viitorul Oradea		
1997–1998	Universitatea Cluj	11	(0)
1998–2003	CSM Reșița	100	(4)
2003–2005	FC Oradea	29	(3)
2005	Diósgyőr	14	(0)
2005–2006	Politehnica Iaşi	11	(1)
2007	Zalaegerszeg	4	(0)
2007	Politehnica Iaşi	3	(1)
2007–2008	Dacia Mioveni	12	(0)
2008–2009	Arieşul Turda	45	(6)
2009	Bihor Oradea	4	(0)
2010	Bioland Paleu		
2010–2011	Sânmartin		
2011–2018	Crișul Sântandrei		
Total		252+	(16+)

Managerial career
- 2010–2011: Sânmartin (assistant)
- 2011: Sânmartin (caretaker)
- 2011–2014: Crișul Sântandrei (assistant)
- 2014–2017: Crișul Sântandrei
- 2017–2018: Unirea Oșorhei
- 2018–2019: Crișul Sântandrei
- 2019: Luceafărul Oradea (assistant)
- 2019: Viitorul Târgu Jiu (assistant)
- 2020–2021: Luceafărul Oradea
- 2021: Luceafărul Oradea (assistant)
- 2021: Luceafărul Oradea
- 2022: CA Oradea
- 2024–: Diosig Bihardiószeg (assistant)
- * Club domestic league appearances and goals

Ciprian Virgil Dianu (born 13 January 1977) is a Romanian football manager and former player. At the end of his career Dianu moved to Oradea, where he played for lower leagues teams and later became a football manager and also a coach at LPS Bihorul (Sports High School). His father, Virgil Dianu was also a footballer.
