= Iulian Anca-Trip =

Romanian footballer

Personal information
- Full name: Iulian Daniel Anca-Trip
- Date of birth: 28 February 1995 (age 31)
- Place of birth: Oradea, Romania
- Height: 1.84 m (6 ft 0 in)
- Position: Goalkeeper

Team information
- Current team: Crișul Sântandrei
- Number: 33

Youth career
- 2005–2013: Liberty Salonta

Senior career*
Years	Team	Apps	(Gls)
2014–2015	Olimpia Satu Mare	35	(0)
2015–2016	UTA Arad	5	(0)
2016–2017	Olimpia Satu Mare	25	(0)
2017–2018	Sportul Snagov	16	(0)
2018	Metaloglobus București	10	(0)
2019	Botoșani	0	(0)
2019–2020	Viitorul Târgu Jiu	11	(0)
2020	Aerostar Bacău	8	(0)
2021	Universitatea Cluj	1	(0)
2021	Unirea Constanța	0	(0)
2021–2023	CSM Olimpia Satu Mare	20	(0)
2023	FC Brașov	0	(0)
2023	Unirea Dej	4	(0)
2024	Crișul Sântandrei	12	(0)
2025	Bihor Oradea	0	(0)
2025–	Crișul Sântandrei	17	(0)

International career
2013	Romania U19	1	(0)
- * Club domestic league appearances and goals as of 13:16, 13 January 2026 (UTC)

Iulian Daniel Anca-Trip (born 28 February 1995) is a Romanian professional footballer who plays as a goalkeeper for Crișul Sântandrei.
