= Alexandru Blidar =

Romanian footballer

Personal information
- Full name: Alexandru Krisztián Blidar
- Date of birth: 19 December 2002 (age 23)
- Place of birth: Budapest, Hungary
- Height: 1.79 m (5 ft 10 in)
- Position: Right midfielder

Team information
- Current team: Crișul Sântandrei

Youth career
- –2020: LPS Bihorul Oradea

Senior career*
Years	Team	Apps	(Gls)
2020–2025	FC U Craiova	34	(4)
2025	Bihorul Beiuș	15	(0)
2026–	Crișul Sântandrei	0	(0)
- * Club domestic league appearances and goals as of 13:19, 13 January 2026 (UTC)

Alexandru Krisztián Blidar (born 19 December 2002) is a Romanian professional footballer who plays as a right midfielder for Liga III side Crișul Sântandrei.

== Club career ==
=== FC U Craiova ===
He made his league debut on 17 October 2021 in Liga I match against UTA Arad.

== Honours ==
FC U Craiova

- Liga II: 2020–21
