= Cosmin Bodea =

Romanian footballer and manager

Personal information
- Date of birth: 12 June 1973 (age 53)
- Place of birth: Beiuș, Romania
- Height: 1.86 m (6 ft 1 in)
- Position: Centre-back

Team information
- Current team: Lotus Băile Felix (manager)

Senior career*
Years	Team	Apps	(Gls)
1994–1995	Bihor Oradea	31	(4)
1995–1996	Brașov	22	(1)
1996–1998	Dinamo București	42	(1)
1998–1999	Sakaryaspor	13	(0)
1999–2006	Brașov	149	(10)
2007	Alki Larnaca	?	(?)
Total		257	(16)

Managerial career
- 2007–2008: Săcele
- 2008–2010: Târgu Mureș
- 2011: Gaz Metan CFR Craiova
- 2012–2013: Oşorhei
- 2014: Olimpia Satu Mare
- 2015: Brașov
- 2018: Sânmartin (technical director)
- 2019: Sânmartin (caretaker)
- 2020–2021: Sânmartin
- 2021–2023: Lotus Băile Felix (technical director)
- 2023–: Lotus Băile Felix
- * Club domestic league appearances and goals

Cosmin Bodea (born 12 June 1973) is a Romanian football manager and former player. Bodea appeared in a Romania national team that played against Kuwait in 2002, but never appeared for the senior Romania national team.
