= Cristian Oroș =

Romanian footballer

Personal information
- Full name: Cristian Daniel Oroș
- Date of birth: 15 October 1984 (age 42)
- Place of birth: Sighetu Marmației, Romania
- Height: 1.80 m (5 ft 11 in)
- Position: Centre-back

Team information
- Current team: Crișul Sântandrei (assistant)

Youth career
- –2002: Olimpia Satu Mare

Senior career*
Years	Team	Apps	(Gls)
2002–2005	Olimpia Satu Mare	34	(0)
2006	Bihor Oradea	22	(2)
2007–2011	FC Brașov	84	(3)
2011–2013	Rapid București	44	(1)
2013–2014	Hoverla Uzhhorod	17	(0)
2014–2017	Astra Giurgiu	65	(2)
2017–2018	Sepsi OSK	13	(0)
2018–2019	Luceafărul Oradea	45	(2)
2019–2020	Viitorul Târgu Jiu	19	(0)
2020	Luceafărul Oradea	3	(0)
2020–2021	Viitorul Târgu Jiu	12	(0)
2021–2022	Lotus Băile Felix	37	(1)
2023–2024	Crișul Sântandrei	19	(1)
Total		414	(12)

International career
2011	Romania	1	(0)

Managerial career
- 2023–2024: Crișul Sântandrei (player/assistant)
- 2024–2025: Bihor Oradea (assistant)
- 2025–: Crișul Sântandrei (assistant)
- * Club domestic league appearances and goals

Cristian Daniel Oroș (born 15 October 1984) is a Romanian former professional footballer who played as centre-back.

== Club career ==
On 26 July 2008, Oroș scored in his first game in Liga I against Unirea Urziceni, while playing for FC Brașov.

== Honours ==
FC Brașov

- Liga II: 2007–08

Rapid București

- Cupa României runner-up: 2011–12

Astra Giurgiu

- Liga I: 2015–16
- Cupa României runner-up: 2016–17
- Supercupa României: 2014, 2016

Crișul Sântandrei

- Liga IV – Bihor County: 2023–24
