= Beiuș =

- Municipality
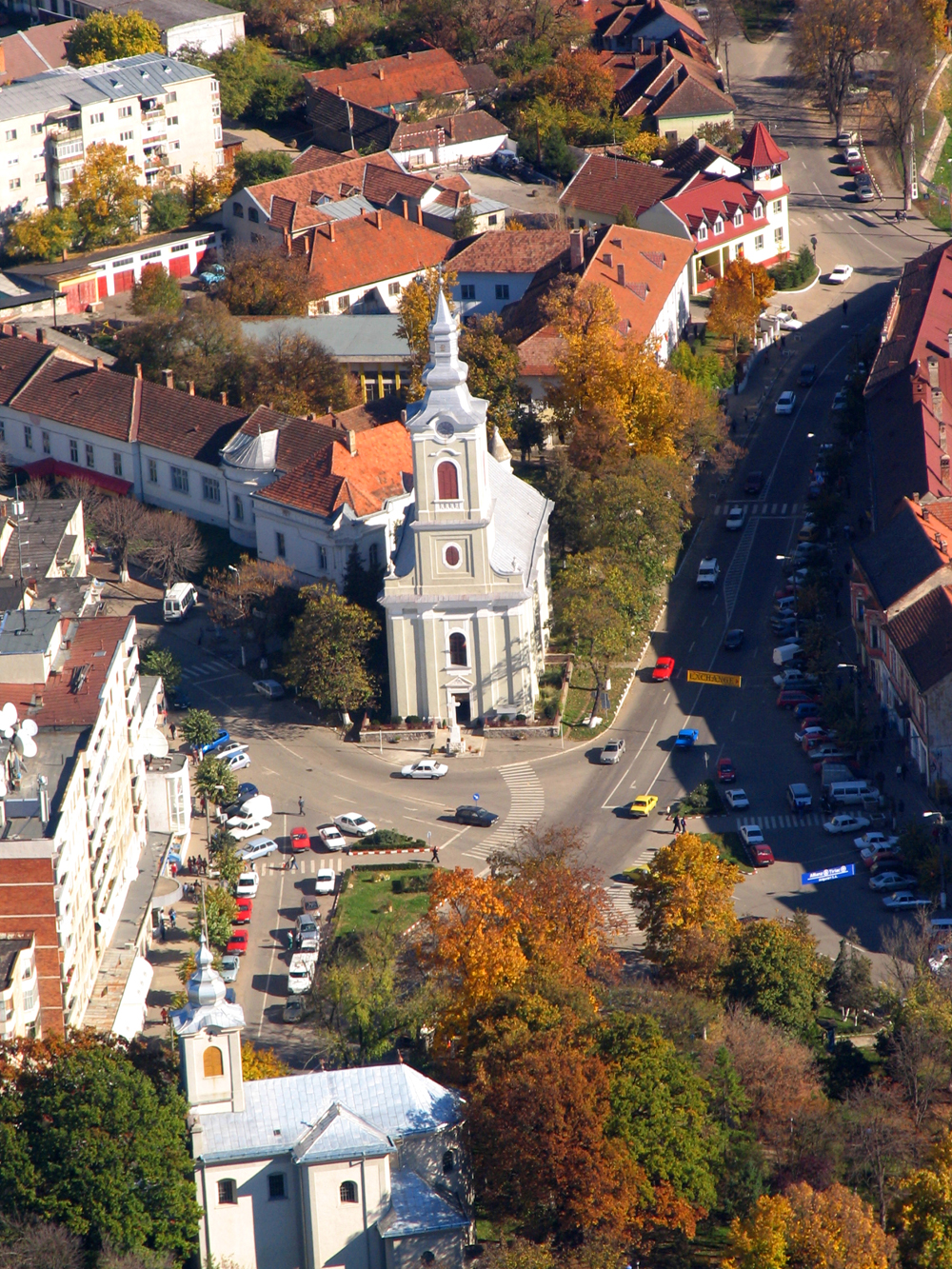
- Aerial view

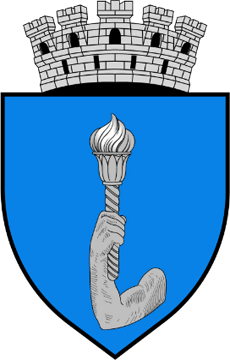
- Coat of arms

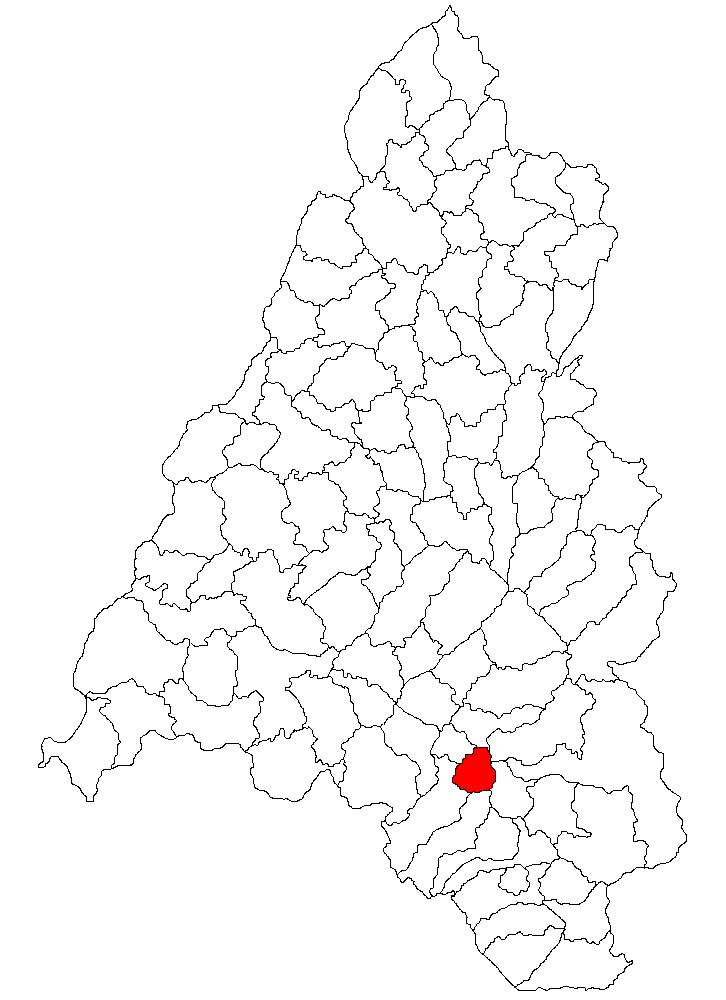
- Location within Bihor County

- Location in Romania
- Coordinates: 46°39′N 22°21′E
- Country: Romania
- County: Bihor

Government
  - Mayor (2024–2028): Gabriel-Cătălin Popa (PNL)
- Area: 24.46 km^{2} (9.44 sq mi)
- Elevation: 191 m (627 ft)
- Population (2021-12-01): 9,745
  - Density: 398.4/km^{2} (1,032/sq mi)
- Time zone: UTC+02:00 (EET)
  - Summer (DST): UTC+03:00 (EEST)
- Postal code: 415200
- Area code: (+40) 02 59
- Vehicle reg.: BH
- Website: www.primariabeius.ro

Beiuș (Romanian pronunciation: [beˈjuʃ]; Hungarian: Belényes) is a city in Bihor County, Romania near the Apuseni Mountains. The river Crișul Negru flows through Beiuș, and the city administers a single village, Delani (Gyalány).

Between the late 18th and very early 20th centuries, Beiuș constituted one of the most important learning centres of the Romanian language in Crișana.

== Demographics ==
Historical population
Year	Pop.	±%
1880	2,947	—
1890	3,385	+14.9%
1900	4,016	+18.6%
1910	4,648	+15.7%
1920	4,303	−7.4%
1930	4,293	−0.2%
1941	8,220	+91.5%
1948	5,807	−29.4%
1956	6,851	+18.0%
1966	8,744	+27.6%
1977	9,960	+13.9%
1992	12,353	+24.0%
2002	12,089	−2.1%
2011	10,667	−11.8%
2021	9,745	−8.6%
Source: Census data

At the 2011 census, the city had a population of 10,667; the ethnic structure of the population was: 89.8% Romanians, 7.3% Hungarians, 2.6% Roma, and 0.3% other. At the 2021 census, Beiuș had a population of 9,745; of those, 81.3% were Romanians, 5.03% Hungarians, and 4,88% Roma.

== History ==
Beiuș's earliest mention in recorded history was in the year 1263, where it was mentioned as being burned down during the Mongol invasion of 1241. After a period of Ottoman occupation, it was conquered in 1691 by the Habsburg Empire, as confirmed by the Treaty of Karlowitz in 1699. After the Austro-Hungarian Compromise of 1867, the town was ruled by the Hungarian administration, until 1918.

After the collapse of Austria-Hungary at the end of World War I, and the declaration of the Union of Transylvania with Romania in December 1918, the Romanian Army took control of Beiuș in April 1919, during the Hungarian–Romanian War. The town officially became part of the territory ceded to the Kingdom of Romania in June 1920 under the terms of the Treaty of Trianon. During the interwar period, it became the seat of plasa Beiuș, in Bihor County. Following the administrative reform of 1950, the town became the seat of Beiuș Raion within Bihor Region (renamed Oradea Region in 1952 and Crișana Region in 1960). In 1968, the old territorial division into județe was reinstituted, and the town reverted to being part of Bihor County.

== Timeline ==
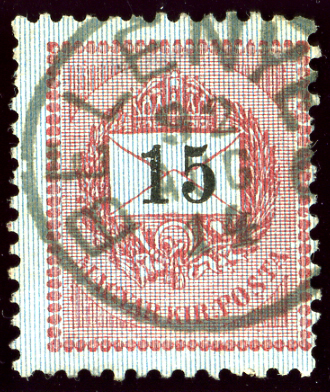
Belényes on Hungarian 15 kr stamp

- Estate of the Oradea Bishopric is mentioned for the first time in the Regestrum Varadiensis. It was mentioned under Benenus in 1291, Belinis in 1300 and Benenes in 1309.
- 1451. Beiuș became a royal free city under John Vitez of Zredna.
- Seal of Beiuș showing Ladislaus I of Hungary inscribed around: "Sigillum Oppidi Belenes".
- 1552. Oradea Bishopric tithe list counts more than 420 settlement houses.
- 1570. Under the Speyer Agreement, the Prince of Transylvania ruled this region.
- 1660. The Ottoman Empire conquered Beiuș.
- 1691. The Habsburg Empire conquered Beiuș.
- 1692. A census mentions 9 Hungarian families.
- 1715. A census mentions 29 Hungarian families.
- 1720. 52 Hungarian families and 22 Romanian families lived in the city.
- 1754. A Romanian secondary school opens, the second in Transylvania after the one at Blaj.
- 1777. Maria Theresa of Austria founded Greek Catholic Bishopric with the residence in Oradea and endowed the Bishopric with an estate in Beiuș.
- Bishop Ignațiu Darabant (1738-1805) erected the Greek Catholic Church of Saint Demetrius
- Bishop Samuil Vulcan (1806–1893) set up the Greek-Catholic secondary school in Beiuș and endowed it with everything necessary.
- 1850. 1,250 Romanian and 950 Hungarian families lived in the city.
- 1914. 2,134 Hungarians and 1,974 Romanians lived in Beiuș.
- 2002. Around 9,800 Romanians and around 900 Hungarians lived in Beiuș.

== Places to see ==
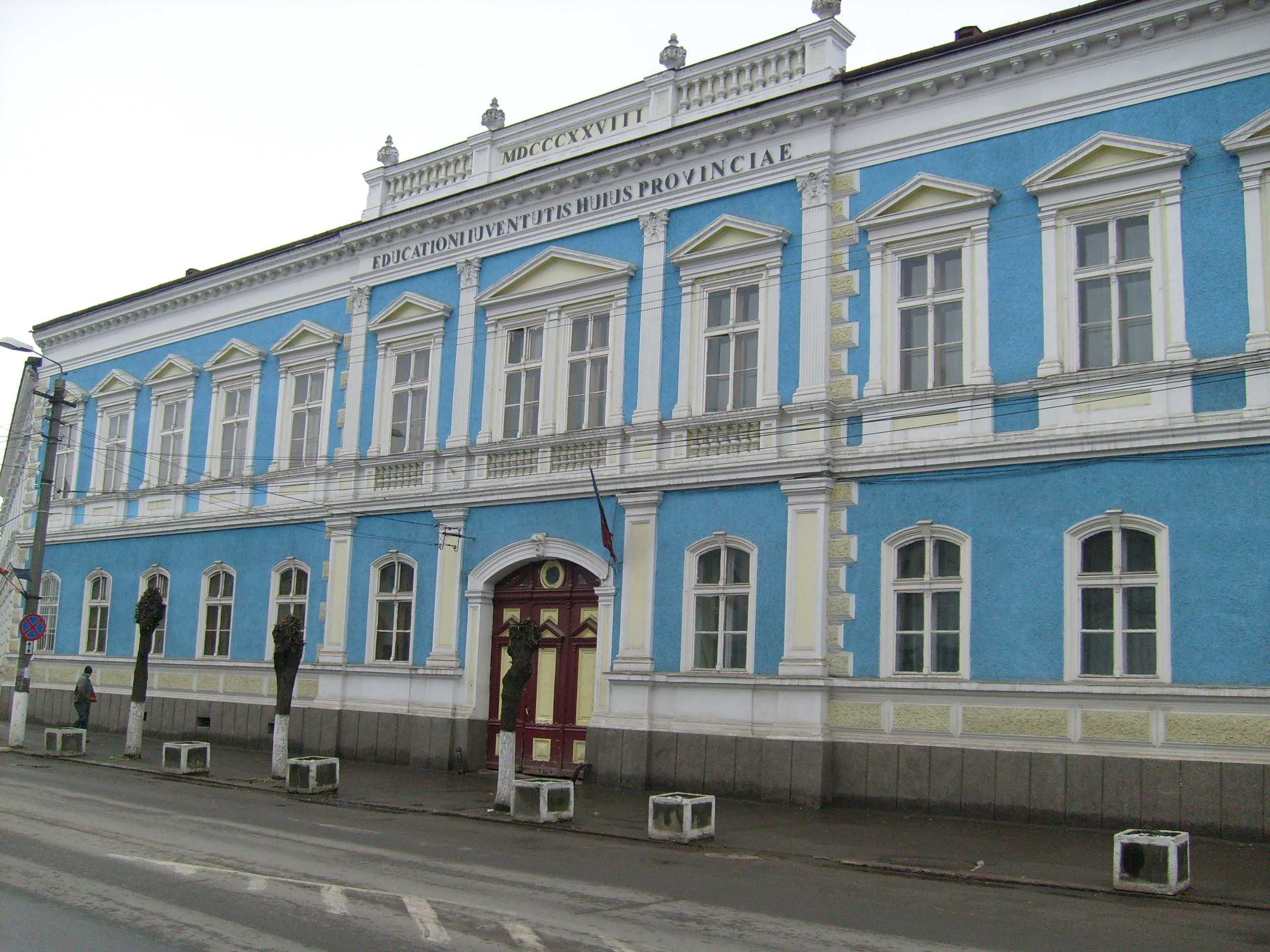
Samuil Vulcan National College

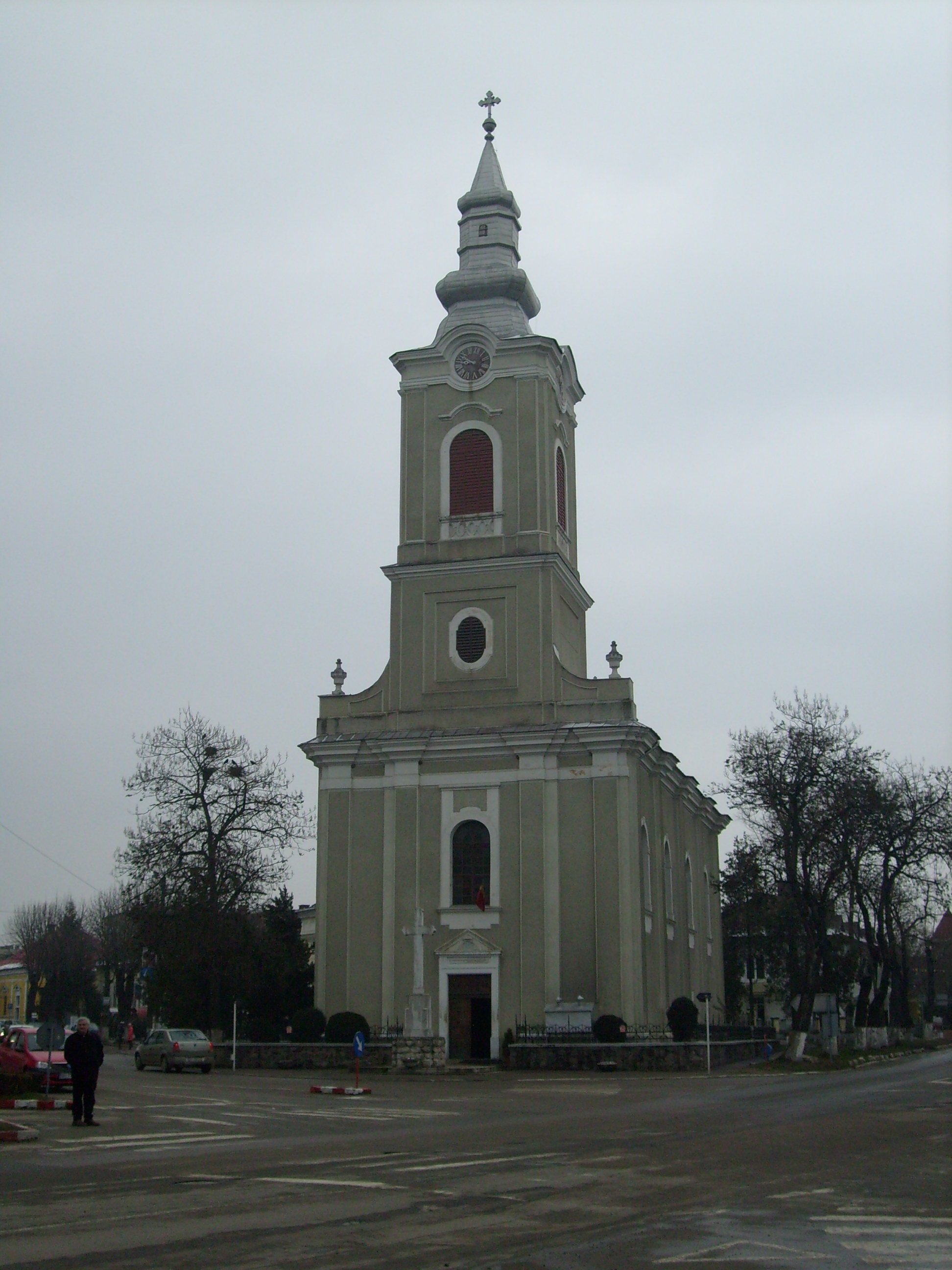
Baroque Church of Saint Demetrius

Today, Beiuș is a peaceful place, combining few ethnicities and three times as many religions as in previous times. The city contains architectural edifices, including a few old churches and the "Samuil Vulcan" highschool, built in 1828, which obtained the "National College" designation in 1998. The city is a key point in reaching the Apuseni Mountains and their mines, or mountain resorts such as Stâna de Vale and Arieșeni through smaller communities and villages like Budureasa and Vașcău. The nearby mountains are hosts to some of the most dense limestone cave systems in the world. These caves contain remains of the extinct cave bear (Ursus speleus) and prehistoric humans, huge colonies of bats, subterranean lakes, calcareous formations and giant earthworms that live in the guano-flooded cave floor.

Beiuș has its own city museum which houses over 3,000 pieces. The museum exhibits reflect its natural history, military history and art, but most famous are its folkloric artifacts: peasant tools, pottery, garments and folk art gathered from the entire central and southern county of Bihor. The tunnels in the city are also famous, as they are believed to link together and act as escape routes used during the Medieval Age. Their construction began during the rule of Hungarian king Bela IV. The nearby landscape includes: agricultural hills with crops ranging from corn, wheat and potato to fruit orchards like apple, pears, plums and strawberries. A long stretch of wildlife depleted forest that is rich in flora begins in the north-east of the city. Industry is represented mainly through production of furniture and fashion destined for European markets. The nearby distillery and beverage factory of Sudrigiu also employs a large part of the city's labour force.

Available or popular sports in or around Beiuș are: fresh water fishing (trout, catfish, carp, barbel, chub, dace, and at least a dozen other edible species), speleology (spelunking), soccer (Sunday soccer is a local ritual for all ages), skiing, snowboarding, sledding, tennis, hiking, camping, backpacking, and rock climbing. Hunting for species like: wild boar, roe deer, rabbit, pheasant, dove, partridge, and ducks (mainly mallards) is also popular.

== Sports ==
Football is the most popular sport in Beiuș, Bihorul Beiuș being the most representative team of the city, a club with a rather rich history, being founded in 1921.

== Notable people ==
- Cosmin Bodea (born 1973), football player and manager
- Edward Clug (born 1973), ballet dancer and choreographer
- Josef Dande (1911–1969), painter
- Remus Ganea (born 1972), footballer
- Adrian Pintea (1954–2007), actor
- Gheorghe Solomie (born 1969), rugby player

== Twin towns – sister cities ==
Beiuș is twinned with:

- Békéscsaba, Hungary
- Green, United States
- Komló, Hungary
- Méhkerék, Hungary
