= Josef Dande =

Hungarian artist

Josef Dande (1911–1969) was a Hungarian artist born in 1911 in Belényes, Hungary. Dande studied at the Budapest Academy of Fine Arts. He is well known for idyllic winter landscapes.
