= 2013–14 Liga IV =

Liga IV
- Season: 2013–14
- Country: Romania

The 2013–14 Liga IV was the 72nd season of the Liga IV, the fourth tier of the Romanian football league system. The champions of each county association play against one from a neighboring county in a play-off match played on a neutral venue. The winners of the play-off matches promoted to Liga III.

== Promotion play-off ==
The matches was scheduled to be played on 21 June 2014.

Team 1	Score	Team 2
Bradul Putna (SV)	2–6	(BN) Gloria II Bistrița
Luceafărul Mihai Eminescu (BT)	0–2	(IS) Rapid Dumești
Voința Ion Creangă (NT)	3–9	(BC) Sport Club Bacău II
Gârceni (VS)	1–2	(GL) Metalosport Galați
Locomotiva Viitorul Buzău (BZ)	1–0	(BR) Viitorul Însurăței
Sepsi OSK (CV)	1–1 (a.e.t.)(5–4 p)	(VN) Selena Jariștea
Delta Dobrogea Tulcea (TL)	6–0	(CT) CFR Constanța
Voința Snagov (IF)	4–0	(IL) Unirea Fierbinți
Înainte Modelu (CL)	3–1	(GR) Petrolul Roata Cartojani
Sporting Roșiori (TR)	1–0	(B) Comprest GIM București
Aninoasa (DB)	1–2	(PH) Astra II
Miercurea Ciuc (HR)	2–0	(BV) Zărnești
Someșul Oar (SM)	1–5	(MM) Sighetu Marmației
Sânmartin (BH)	5–3	(SJ) Sportul Șimleu Silvaniei
Plaiul Iacobeni (CJ)	1–2	(MS) Iernut
UTA Arad (AR)	2–0	(HD) Retezatul Hațeg
Măgura Cisnădie (SB)	0–0 (a.e.t.)(3–4 p)	(CS) Metalul Oțelu Roșu
Muscelul Câmpulung (AG)	1–0	(OT) Inter Markus Coteana
Flacăra Horezu (VL)	2–3	(DJ) Filiași
Ghiroda (TM)	2–2 (a.e.t.)(3–4 p)	(AB) Industria Galda
Minerul Mehedinți (MH)	2–0 (a.e.t.)	(GJ) Gilortul Târgu Cărbunești

== County leagues ==
=== Alba County ===
Pos	Team	Pld	W	D	L	GF	GA	GD	Pts	Qualification or relegation
1	Industria Galda (C, Q)	24	22	0	2	66	13	+53	66	Qualification to promotion play-off
2	Cuprirom Abrud	24	15	3	6	61	30	+31	48	
3	Viitorul Sântimbru	24	15	2	7	49	27	+22	47	
4	Performanța Ighiu	24	14	3	7	60	24	+36	45	
5	Olimpia Aiud	24	11	4	9	44	36	+8	37	
6	Inter Ciugud	24	11	3	10	42	38	+4	36	
7	Dalia Sport Daia Romană	24	9	2	13	43	43	0	29	
8	Rapid CFR Teiuș	24	8	5	11	25	32	−7	29	
9	Arena Alba Iulia	24	9	2	13	18	40	−22	29 (Note: Arena Alba Iulia withdrew from the championship and lost all the matches from the second part of the championship by forfeit.)	
10	Ocna Mureș	24	6	5	13	30	48	−18	23	
11	Energia Săsciori	24	7	2	15	31	56	−25	23	
12	Mureșul Vințu de Jos	24	7	1	16	40	55	−15	22	
13	Metalul Aiud	24	5	2	17	20	87	−67	17 (Note: Metalul Aiud withdrew from the championship during the winter break and lost all matches from the second part of the championship by forfeit.)	
14	FC Cugir (D)	0	0	0	0	0	0	0	0 (Note: FC Cugir withdrew from the championship after 10 rounds and all its results were canceled.)	Expelled

Rules for classification: 1) Points; 2) Head-to-head points; 3) Head-to-head goal difference; 4) Head-to-head goals scored; 5) Head-to-head away goals scored; 6) Goal difference; 7) Goals scored.
(C) Champions; (D) Disqualified; (Q) Qualified for the phase indicated

=== Arad County ===
Pos	Team	Pld	W	D	L	GF	GA	GD	Pts	Qualification or relegation
1	UTA Bătrâna Doamnă (C, Q)	30	25	3	2	143	9	+134	78	Qualification to promotion play-off
2	Progresul Pecica	30	24	2	4	92	23	+69	74	
3	Gloria CTP Arad	30	23	3	4	92	11	+81	72	
4	Crișul Chișineu-Criș	30	17	6	7	65	30	+35	57	
5	Unirea Sântana	30	15	3	12	62	42	+20	48	
6	Frontiera Curtici	30	14	5	11	63	39	+24	47	
7	Voința Mailat	30	13	8	9	43	26	+17	47	
8	Victoria Lunca-Teuz Cermei	30	15	2	13	60	53	+7	47	
9	Păulișana Păuliș	30	10	9	11	51	51	0	39	
10	Aqua Vest Arad	30	12	2	16	58	68	−10	38	
11	Victoria Zăbrani	30	11	2	17	52	70	−18	35	
12	Banatul Sânnicolau Mic	30	8	5	17	42	66	−24	29	
13	Șoimii Tăuț	30	9	2	19	32	66	−34	29	
14	Semlecana Semlac	30	9	2	19	36	72	−36	29	
15	Șiriana Șiria (R)	30	5	1	24	28	134	−106	16	Relegation to Liga V Arad
16	Foresta Oil Sânpetru German (R)	30	2	1	27	24	183	−159	7	Relegation to Liga V Arad

Rules for classification: 1) Points; 2) Head-to-head points; 3) Head-to-head goal difference; 4) Head-to-head goals scored; 5) Head-to-head away goals scored; 6) Goal difference; 7) Goals scored.
(C) Champions; (Q) Qualified for the phase indicated; (R) Relegated

=== Argeș County ===
Pos	Team	Pld	W	D	L	GF	GA	GD	Pts	Qualification or relegation
1	Dinicu Golescu Câmpulung	32	26	4	2	101	20	+81	82	Qualification to promotion play-off
2	Valea Ursului	32	25	5	2	97	22	+75	80	
3	Mioveni II	32	23	3	6	94	28	+66	72	
4	Dinamic Curtea de Argeș	32	21	6	5	106	46	+60	69	
5	Bascov	32	18	8	6	88	54	+34	62	
6	Viitorul Ștefănești	32	18	7	7	72	34	+38	61	
7	Victoria Buzoiești	32	16	9	7	71	47	+24	57	
8	Miroși	32	14	5	13	75	81	−6	47	
9	Sporting Pitești	32	13	6	13	86	67	+19	45	
10	Atletic Bradu II	32	12	1	19	100	102	−2	37	
11	Olimpia Suseni	32	9	6	17	55	86	−31	33	
12	DLR Pitești	32	9	5	18	39	68	−29	32 (Note: DLR Pitești–Rucăr 6–2; Rucăr–DLR Pitești 2–1.)	
13	Rucăr	32	10	2	20	45	94	−49	32	
14	Viitorul Cireșu	32	8	6	18	60	109	−49	30	
15	Domnești	32	6	3	23	43	109	−66	21	
16	Rapid Pitești (R)	31	1	4	26	21	95	−74	7	Relegation to Liga V Argeș
17	Unirea Costești (R)	31	1	2	28	15	106	−91	5	Relegation to Liga V Argeș

Rules for classification: 1) Points; 2) Head-to-head points; 3) Head-to-head goal difference; 4) Head-to-head goals scored; 5) Head-to-head away goals scored; 6) Goal difference; 7) Goals scored.
(R) Relegated

=== Bacău County ===
Pos	Team	Pld	W	D	L	GF	GA	GD	Pts	Qualification or relegation
1	Sport Club Bacău II (C, Q)	32	30	2	0	118	22	+96	92	Qualification to promotion play-off
2	Dinamo Onești	32	29	2	1	205	10	+195	89	
3	Voința Oituz	32	17	3	12	100	63	+37	54	
4	Condorii Bacău	32	17	2	13	58	80	−22	53	
5	Filipești	32	16	4	12	89	65	+24	52	
6	Dofteana	32	15	4	13	73	74	−1	49	
7	Siretu	32	14	5	13	60	61	−1	47	
8	Șoimii Helegiu	32	14	3	15	62	65	−3	45	
9	Gloria Zemeș	32	13	3	16	64	88	−24	42	
10	Uzu Dărmănești	32	12	5	15	55	51	+4	41	
11	Negri	32	13	1	18	64	93	−29	40	
12	Voința Gârleni	32	12	2	18	52	72	−20	38	
13	Târgu Ocna	32	10	3	19	52	93	−41	33	
14	Athletic Comănești	32	10	3	19	57	115	−58	33	
15	Măgura Cașin	32	9	4	19	72	118	−46	31	
16	Nicolae Bălcescu	32	8	6	18	40	65	−25	30	
17	Flamura Roșie Sascut (R)	32	5	4	23	39	125	−86	19	Relegation to Liga V Bacău
18	Sportul Răcăciuni (R)	0	0	0	0	0	0	0	0 (Note: Sportul Răcăciuni withdrew after two rounds and all its results were canceled.)	Expelled

Rules for classification: 1) Points; 2) Head-to-head points; 3) Head-to-head goal difference; 4) Head-to-head goals scored; 5) Head-to-head away goals scored; 6) Goal difference; 7) Goals scored.
(C) Champions; (Q) Qualified for the phase indicated; (R) Relegated

=== Bihor County ===
Pos	Team	Pld	W	D	L	GF	GA	GD	Pts	Qualification or relegation
1	Sânmartin (C, Q)	30	26	2	2	134	26	+108	80	Qualification to promotion play-off
2	Hidișelu de Sus	30	23	6	1	92	26	+66	75 (Note: Kinder Junior Paleu–Hidișelu de Sus 0–0; Hidișelu de Sus–Kinder Junior Paleu 3–2;)	
3	Kinder Junior Paleu	30	24	3	3	114	24	+90	75	
4	Crișul Sântandrei	30	23	3	4	80	26	+54	72	
5	Bihorul Beiuș	30	18	3	9	67	48	+19	57	
6	Ștei	30	14	5	11	44	49	−5	47 (Note: Olimpia Salonta–Ștei 0–0; Ștei–Olimpia Salonta 2–0;)	
7	Olimpia Salonta	30	15	2	13	78	49	+29	47	
8	Viitorul Marghita	30	12	5	13	55	61	−6	41	
9	Victoria Avram Iancu	30	12	4	14	68	89	−21	40	
10	Partium Oradea	30	10	4	16	50	68	−18	34	
11	Viitorul Borș	30	9	6	15	47	62	−15	33	
12	Luceafărul Oradea	30	9	2	19	49	83	−34	29	
13	Poiana Budureasa	30	6	6	18	38	80	−42	24	
14	Crișul Aleșd (Note: Crișul Aleșd was spared from relegation due to the promotion of Sânmartin to Liga III.)	30	7	2	21	39	90	−51	23	Spared from relegation
15	Liberty Oradea	30	2	3	25	31	125	−94	9	Relegation to Liga V Bihor
16	Biharea Vașcău (R)	30	1	2	27	9	88	−79	5 (Note: Biharea Vașcău withdrew during the winter break and lost all the matches from second part with 0–3.)	Relegation to Liga V Bihor

Rules for classification: Rules for classification: 1) Points 2) Head-to-head points; 3) Head-to-head goal difference; 4) Head-to-head goals scored; 5) Head-to-head away goals scored; 6) Goal difference; 7) Goals scored.
(C) Champions; (Q) Qualified for the phase indicated; (R) Relegated

=== Bistrița-Năsăud County ===
Pos	Team	Pld	W	D	L	GF	GA	GD	Pts	Qualification or relegation
1	Gloria Bistrița II (C, Q)	30	27	2	1	158	19	+139	83	Qualification to promotion play-off
2	Voința Cetate	30	17	8	5	93	43	+50	59	
3	Progresul Năsăud	30	19	2	9	80	68	+12	59	
4	Heniu Leșu	30	17	6	7	75	42	+33	57	
5	Silvicultorul Maieru	30	17	3	10	105	75	+30	54	
6	Eciro Forest Telciu	30	14	7	9	55	54	+1	49	
7	Atletico Monor	30	13	7	10	60	48	+12	46	
8	Hebe Sângeorz-Băi	30	14	2	14	68	73	−5	44	
9	Viitorul Lechința	30	13	4	13	82	67	+15	43	
10	Voința Livezile	30	12	4	14	68	69	−1	40	
11	Luceafarul Șieu	30	12	3	15	55	58	−3	39	
12	Dumitra	30	11	3	16	68	70	−2	36	
13	Victoria Uriu	30	8	2	20	52	134	−82	26	
14	Heniu Prundu Bârgăului	30	7	4	19	54	87	−33	25	
15	Venus Negrilești (R)	30	6	7	17	62	120	−58	25	Relegation to Liga V Bistrița-Năsăud
16	Vulturul Arcalia (R)	30	1	0	29	22	130	−108	3	Relegation to Liga V Bistrița-Năsăud

Rules for classification: 1) Points; 2) Head-to-head points; 3) Head-to-head goal difference; 4) Head-to-head goals scored; 5) Head-to-head away goals scored; 6) Goal difference; 7) Goals scored.
(C) Champions; (Q) Qualified for the phase indicated; (R) Relegated

=== Botoșani County ===
Pos	Team	Pld	W	D	L	GF	GA	GD	Pts	Qualification or relegation
1	Luceafărul Mihai Eminescu (C, Q)	26	23	2	1	91	17	+74	71	Qualification to promotion play-off
2	TransDor Tudora	26	20	2	4	85	21	+64	62	
3	Viitorul Dersca	26	15	2	9	67	37	+30	47	
4	Dante Botoșani	26	14	4	8	51	37	+14	46	
5	Darabani	26	13	3	10	55	45	+10	42	
6	Rapid Ungureni	26	12	2	12	55	56	−1	38	
7	Sportivul Trușești	26	11	3	12	61	71	−10	36	
8	Bucovina Rogojești	26	10	4	12	56	49	+7	34	
9	Avântul Albești	26	10	2	14	43	47	−4	32	
10	Flacăra 1907 Flămânzi	26	10	2	14	46	65	−19	32	
11	Prosport Vârfu Câmpului	26	9	4	13	47	55	−8	31	
12	Păltiniș	26	9	3	14	45	76	−31	30	
13	Bucecea	26	6	1	19	34	98	−64	19	
14	Zona Botoșani (R)	26	2	2	22	15	77	−62	8	Relegation to Liga V Botoșani
15	Viitorul Botoșani (D)	0	0	0	0	0	0	0	0 (Note: Viitorul Botoșani and Nord Star Pomârla withdrew in the first part of the season and all their results were canceled.)	Withdrew
16	Nord Star Pomârla (D)	0	0	0	0	0	0	0	0	Withdrew

Rules for classification: 1) Points; 2) Head-to-head points; 3) Head-to-head goal difference; 4) Head-to-head goals scored; 5) Head-to-head away goals scored; 6) Goal difference; 7) Goals scored.
(C) Champions; (D) Disqualified; (Q) Qualified for the phase indicated; (R) Relegated

=== Brașov County ===
Pos	Team	Pld	W	D	L	GF	GA	GD	Pts	Qualification or relegation
1	Zărnești (C, Q)	30	26	3	1	106	20	+86	81	Qualification to promotion play-off
2	Inter Cristian	30	22	4	4	108	34	+74	70	
3	Înfrățirea Agromec Hărman	30	21	4	5	89	29	+60	67	
4	Viitorul Ghimbav	30	20	1	9	87	38	+49	61	
5	Olimpic Voila	30	14	6	10	49	48	+1	48	
6	Râșnov	30	14	5	11	66	65	+1	47	
7	Victoria	30	14	3	13	73	73	0	45	
8	Energia Unirea Feldioara	30	13	6	11	62	67	−5	45	
9	Carpați Berivoi	30	13	5	12	64	80	−16	44	
10	Codlea	30	11	3	16	62	60	+2	36	
11	Ghimbav 2000	30	11	3	16	55	72	−17	36	
12	Doripesco Hălchiu	30	8	6	16	43	65	−22	30	
13	Vulcan	30	7	7	16	53	85	−32	28	
14	Aripile Brașov (R)	30	7	3	20	53	83	−30	24	Relegation to Liga V Brașov
15	Cața (R)	30	4	2	24	32	110	−78	14	Relegation to Liga V Brașov
16	Cetatea Rupea-Homorod (R)	30	2	5	23	24	97	−73	11	Relegation to Liga V Brașov

Rules for classification: 1) Points; 2) Head-to-head points; 3) Head-to-head goal difference; 4) Head-to-head goals scored; 5) Head-to-head away goals scored; 6) Goal difference; 7) Goals scored.
(C) Champions; (Q) Qualified for the phase indicated; (R) Relegated

=== Brăila County ===
Pos	Team	Pld	W	D	L	GF	GA	GD	Pts	Qualification
1	Viitorul Însurăței	22	19	1	2	81	23	+58	58	Qualification to championship play-off
2	Victoria Traian	22	16	4	2	82	27	+55	52	Qualification to championship play-off
3	Pandurii Tudor Vladimirescu	22	16	1	5	86	31	+55	49	Qualification to championship play-off
4	Sportul Chiscani	22	13	2	7	65	32	+33	41	Qualification to championship play-off
5	Făurei	22	12	2	8	57	43	+14	38	Qualification to championship play-off
6	Viitorul Ianca	22	10	6	6	53	28	+25	36	Qualification to championship play-off
7	Voința Vișani	22	9	1	12	57	56	+1	28	Qualification to championship play-out
8	Victoria Cazasu	22	8	2	12	54	58	−4	26	Qualification to championship play-out
9	Victoria Old-Boys Însurăței	22	7	2	13	43	67	−24	23	Qualification to championship play-out
10	Avântul Mircea Vodă	22	5	4	13	44	63	−19	19	Qualification to championship play-out
11	Viitorul Galbenu	22	3	0	19	18	121	−103	9 (Note: Viitorul Galbenu withdrew from the championship after 20 rounds and lost all the remaining matches with 0–3.)	Qualification to championship play-out
12	Voința Surdila-Găiseanca	22	1	1	20	16	107	−91	4	Qualification to championship play-out

Rules for classification: 1) Points; 2) Head-to-head points; 3) Head-to-head goal difference; 4) Head-to-head goals scored; 5) Head-to-head away goals scored; 6) Goal difference; 7) Goals scored.

==== Championship play-off ====
The teams started the play-off with only the records achieved in the regular season against the other qualified teams.

Pos	Team	Pld	W	D	L	GF	GA	GD	Pts	Qualification
1	Viitorul Însurăței (C, Q)	20	16	1	3	66	27	+39	49	Qualification to promotion play-off
2	Victoria Traian	20	11	4	5	40	36	+4	37	
3	Pandurii Tudor Vladimirescu	20	9	5	6	43	37	+6	32	
4	Viitorul Ianca	20	4	6	10	20	31	−11	18	
5	Făurei	20	5	3	12	29	44	−15	18	
6	Sportul Chiscani	20	4	3	13	21	44	−23	15	

Rules for classification: 1) Points; 2) Head-to-head points; 3) Head-to-head goal difference; 4) Head-to-head goals scored; 5) Head-to-head away goals scored; 6) Goal difference; 7) Goals scored.
(C) Champions; (Q) Qualified for the phase indicated

==== Championship play-out ====
The teams started the play-out with only the records achieved in the regular season against the other qualified teams.

Pos	Team	Pld	W	D	L	GF	GA	GD	Pts	Relegation
7	Voința Vișani	20	14	3	3	67	26	+41	45	
8	Avântul Mircea Vodă	20	13	3	4	72	26	+46	42	
9	Victoria Cazasu	20	11	1	8	60	52	+8	34	
10	Victoria Old-Boys Însurăței	20	9	1	10	45	49	−4	28	
11	Voința Surdila-Găiseanca (R)	20	5	2	13	29	61	−32	17	Relegation to Liga V Brăila
12	Viitorul Galbenu (R)	20	3	0	17	17	76	−59	9 (Note: Viitorul Galbenu withdrew from the championship in the regular season and lost all the matches from play-out with 0–3.)	Relegation to Liga V Brăila

Rules for classification: 1) Points; 2) Head-to-head points; 3) Head-to-head goal difference; 4) Head-to-head goals scored; 5) Head-to-head away goals scored; 6) Goal difference; 7) Goals scored.
(R) Relegated

=== Bucharest ===
==== Regular season ====
===== Seria 1 =====
Pos	Team	Pld	W	D	L	GF	GA	GD	Pts	Qualification or relegation
1	Chitila	22	19	2	1	120	10	+110	59 (Note: Chitila dropped out of the play-offs due to financial problems. It was replaced by the 5th place team.)	Withdrew
2	Juniorul București	22	19	1	2	128	21	+107	58	Qualification to championship play-off
3	Voluntari II	22	17	2	3	101	16	+85	53	Qualification to championship play-off
4	GVD București	22	13	2	7	49	43	+6	41	Qualification to championship play-off
5	Corbeanca	22	10	2	10	42	58	−16	32	Qualification to championship play-off
6	Pantelimon	22	10	0	12	31	68	−37	30	
7	Speranța Săbăreni	22	8	3	11	45	66	−21	27	
8	Voința Buftea	22	8	1	13	44	79	−35	25	
9	Concordia Chiajna III	20	7	2	11	50	41	+9	23 (Note: Concordia Chiajna III and Progresul Cernica II withdrew in the second part of the season and lost all remaining matches with 0–3.)	
10	Victoria București	22	6	1	15	26	108	−82	19	
11	VK Soccer București	21	4	1	16	35	89	−54	13	
12	Progresul Cernica II	21	0	1	20	11	83	−72	1	
13	Sportul Studențesc București II (D)	0	0	0	0	0	0	0	0 (Note: Sportul Studențesc II and Frăția București II withdrew in the first part of the season and all their results were canceled.)	Withdrew
14	Frăția București II (D)	0	0	0	0	0	0	0	0	Withdrew

Rules for classification: 1) Points; 2) Head-to-head points; 3) Head-to-head goal difference; 4) Head-to-head goals scored; 5) Head-to-head away goals scored; 6) Goal difference; 7) Goals scored.
(D) Disqualified

===== Seria 2 =====
Pos	Team	Pld	W	D	L	GF	GA	GD	Pts	Qualification or relegation
1	Electrica București	26	18	7	1	57	18	+39	61	Qualification to championship play-off
2	Comprest GIM București	26	17	5	4	73	24	+49	56	Qualification to championship play-off
3	Athletico Floreasca	26	17	4	5	96	47	+49	55	Qualification to championship play-off
4	Electroaparataj București	26	17	4	5	90	41	+49	55	Qualification to championship play-off
5	Ilie Oană București	26	14	4	8	69	40	+29	46	
6	Unirea Tricolor București	26	14	3	9	62	40	+22	45	
7	Progresul București	26	12	5	9	63	51	+12	41	
8	1 Decembrie	26	12	1	13	64	69	−5	37	
9	Metaloglobus București II	26	10	4	12	58	75	−17	34	
10	Frăția București	26	8	7	11	47	56	−9	31	
11	Romprim București	26	9	0	17	64	86	−22	27	
12	Spicul Rompan București	25	5	3	17	47	89	−42	18 (Note: Șoimii IMUC and Spicul Rompan withdrew in the second part of the season and lost all remaining matches with 0–3.)	
13	Juniorul București II	26	4	1	21	32	95	−63	13	
14	Șoimii IMUC București	25	0	0	25	14	105	−91	0	

Rules for classification: 1) Points; 2) Head-to-head points; 3) Head-to-head goal difference; 4) Head-to-head goals scored; 5) Head-to-head away goals scored; 6) Goal difference; 7) Goals scored.

==== Championship play-off ====
===== Group 1 =====
All matches were played at Romprim Stadium in Bucharest.

Pos	Team	Pld	W	D	L	GF	GA	GD	Pts	Qualification	COM	JUN	ELP	COR
1	Comprest GIM București (Q)	3	2	1	0	8	1	+7	7	Qualification to semi-finals			2–1	
2	Juniorul București (Q)	3	2	1	0	7	1	+6	7	Qualification to semi-finals	0–0		4–0	3–1
3	Electroaparataj București	3	1	0	2	6	9	−3	3					5–3
4	Corbeanca	3	0	0	3	4	14	−10	0		0–6			

Rules for classification: 1) Points; 2) Head-to-head points; 3) Head-to-head goal difference; 4) Head-to-head goals scored; 5) Head-to-head away goals scored; 6) Goal difference; 7) Goals scored.
(Q) Qualified for the phase indicated

===== Group 2 =====
All matches were played at Florea Dumitrache Stadium in Bucharest.

Pos	Team	Pld	W	D	L	GF	GA	GD	Pts	Qualification	VOL	GVD	ATF	ELE
1	Voluntari II (Q)	3	2	1	0	7	3	+4	7	Qualification to semi-finals			1–1	
2	GVD București (Q)	3	2	0	1	6	5	+1	6	Qualification to semi-finals	2–3		2–1	
3	Athletico Floreasca	3	1	1	1	6	6	0	4					
4	Electrica București	3	0	0	3	4	9	−5	0		0–3	1–2	3–4	

Rules for classification: 1) Points; 2) Head-to-head points; 3) Head-to-head goal difference; 4) Head-to-head goals scored; 5) Head-to-head away goals scored; 6) Goal difference; 7) Goals scored.
(Q) Qualified for the phase indicated

===== Semi-finals =====
Team 1	Score	Team 2
Juniorul București	1–1 (5–4 p)	Voluntari II
Comprest GIM București	6–5 (3–2 p)	GVD București

===== Final =====
Team 1	Score	Team 2
Comprest GIM București	2–1	Juniorul București

Comprest GIM București won the 2013–14 Liga IV Bucharest and qualify to promotion play-off in Liga III.

=== Buzău County ===
Pos	Team	Pld	W	D	L	GF	GA	GD	Pts	Qualification or relegation
1	Locomotiva Viitorul Buzău (C, Q)	30	25	3	2	108	23	+85	78	Qualification to promotion play-off
2	Voința Lanurile	30	23	4	3	73	29	+44	73	
3	Puiești	30	22	2	6	109	41	+68	68	
4	Olimpia Râmnicu Sărat	30	20	5	5	84	31	+53	65	
5	Avântul Spartac Zărnești	30	19	5	6	78	33	+45	62	
6	Metalul LPS Buzău	30	17	6	7	80	37	+43	57	
7	Petrolul Berca	30	11	7	12	60	53	+7	40	
8	Steaua Săhăteni	30	9	7	14	52	86	−34	34	
9	Recolta Sălcioara	30	10	2	18	54	80	−26	32	
10	Viitorul 08 Vernești	30	8	5	17	44	84	−40	29	
11	Tricolorul Gălbinași	30	9	2	19	42	86	−44	29	
12	Carpați Nehoiu	30	8	4	18	46	60	−14	28	
13	Com Sageata	30	8	4	18	55	85	−30	28	
14	Pescărușul Luciu (R)	30	8	2	20	55	107	−52	26	Relegation to Liga V Buzău
15	Gloria Buzău II (R)	30	8	1	21	66	92	−26	25	Relegation to Liga V Buzău
16	Victoria Boboc (R)	30	3	5	22	38	117	−79	14	Relegation to Liga V Buzău

Rules for classification: 1) Points; 2) Head-to-head points; 3) Head-to-head goal difference; 4) Head-to-head goals scored; 5) Head-to-head away goals scored; 6) Goal difference; 7) Goals scored.
(C) Champions; (Q) Qualified for the phase indicated; (R) Relegated

=== Călărași County ===
Pos	Team	Pld	W	D	L	GF	GA	GD	Pts	Qualification or relegation
1	Înainte Modelu (C, Q)	30	27	3	0	130	15	+115	84	Qualification to promotion play-off
2	Venus Independența	30	20	3	7	84	37	+47	63	
3	Victoria Chirnogi	30	20	3	7	79	32	+47	63	
4	Dunărea Ciocănești	30	19	4	7	65	27	+38	61	
5	Unirea Mânăstirea	30	15	5	10	55	35	+20	50	
6	Oltenița	30	13	6	11	54	50	+4	45	
7	Agricola Borcea	30	13	5	12	61	51	+10	44	
8	Victoria Lehliu	30	13	4	13	55	53	+2	43	
9	Progresul Fundulea	30	12	5	13	49	55	−6	41	
10	Rapid Ulmeni	30	11	5	14	53	59	−6	38	
11	Avântul Dor Mărunt	30	9	3	18	46	71	−25	30	
12	Victoria Dragoș Vodă	30	8	5	17	39	83	−44	29	
13	Dunărea Grădiștea	30	9	1	20	51	83	−32	28	
14	Steaua Radovanu (O)	30	7	5	18	39	75	−36	26	Qualification to relegation play-off
15	Vitorul Curcani (R)	30	7	5	18	33	63	−30	26	Relegation to Liga V Călărași
16	Dinamo Sărulești (R)	30	5	2	23	37	141	−104	17	Relegation to Liga V Călărași

Rules for classification: 1) Points; 2) Head-to-head points; 3) Head-to-head goal difference; 4) Head-to-head goals scored; 5) Head-to-head away goals scored; 6) Goal difference; 7) Goals scored.
(C) Champions; (O) Play-off winners; (Q) Qualified for the phase indicated; (R) Relegated

==== Relegation play-off ====
Pos	Team	Pld	W	D	L	GF	GA	GD	Pts	Qualification	SRA	API	UFR
1	Steaua Radovanu (O)	2	2	0	0	5	1	+4	6	Remain in 2014–15 Liga IV	—	—	3–0
2	Avântul Pietroiu (P)	2	1	0	1	6	4	+2	3	Promotion to 2014–15 Liga IV	1–2	—	—
3	Unirea Frăsinet	2	0	0	2	2	8	−6	0		—	2–5	—

Rules for classification: 1) Points; 2) Head-to-head points; 3) Head-to-head goal difference; 4) Head-to-head goals scored; 5) Head-to-head away goals scored; 6) Goal difference; 7) Goals scored.
(O) Play-off winners; (P) Promoted

=== Caraș-Severin County ===
Pos	Team	Pld	W	D	L	GF	GA	GD	Pts	Qualification or relegation
1	Recolta Berzovia (C)	22	13	3	6	62	31	+31	42 (Note: Metalul Oțelu Roșu qualified for promotion play-off because Recolta Berzovia did not have C.I.S. (Certificate of Sports Identity) and was not eligible for promotion.)	Ineligible for promotion
2	Metalul Oțelu Roșu (Q)	22	13	2	7	59	30	+29	41	Qualification to promotion play-off
3	Minerul Anina	22	11	5	6	58	41	+17	38	
4	Metalul Reșița II	22	11	4	7	66	44	+22	37	
5	Oravița	22	11	2	9	50	43	+7	35	
6	Nera Bozovici	22	10	2	10	45	57	−12	32	
7	Semenicul Văliug	22	9	5	8	50	50	0	32	
8	Berzasca	22	9	3	10	39	32	+7	30	
9	Agmonia Zăvoi	22	9	3	10	39	48	−9	30	
10	Metalul Bocșa	22	9	1	12	39	54	−15	28	
11	Ad Mediam Mehadia	22	5	2	15	33	68	−35	17	
12	Moldova Nouă	22	4	4	14	19	61	−42	16	

Rules for classification: 1) Points; 2) Head-to-head points; 3) Head-to-head goal difference; 4) Head-to-head goals scored; 5) Head-to-head away goals scored; 6) Goal difference; 7) Goals scored.
(C) Champions; (Q) Qualified for the phase indicated

=== Cluj County ===
Pos	Team	Pld	W	D	L	GF	GA	GD	Pts	Qualification or relegation
1	Plaiul Iacobeni (C, Q)	24	19	4	1	66	21	+45	61	Qualification to promotion play-off
2	Aghireșu	24	15	4	5	69	25	+44	49	
3	Vulturul Mintiu Gherlii	24	14	3	7	52	28	+24	45	
4	Viitorul Gârbău	24	13	1	10	66	49	+17	40	
5	Someșul Apahida	24	12	4	8	49	28	+21	40	
6	Potaissa 2011 Turda	24	12	3	9	53	49	+4	39	
7	Vlădeasa Huedin	24	11	3	10	37	52	−15	36	
8	Unirea Florești	24	10	3	11	56	52	+4	33	
9	Unirea Tritenii de Jos	24	8	4	12	36	61	−25	28	
10	Someșul Gilău	24	6	5	13	38	69	−31	23	
11	CFR Cluj-Napoca II	24	6	2	16	34	58	−24	20 (Note: CFR Cluj-Napoca II withdrew at the end of the first part of the season and lost all remaining matches with 0–3.)	
12	Băița Gherla	24	6	0	18	34	47	−13	18	
13	CFR Dej	24	4	4	16	25	76	−51	16	
14	CFR Internațional Cluj-Napoca (D)	0	0	0	0	0	0	0	0 (Note: CFR Internațional Cluj-Napoca withdrew after 6 rounds and all its results were canceled)	Withdrew

Rules for classification: 1) Points; 2) Head-to-head points; 3) Head-to-head goal difference; 4) Head-to-head goals scored; 5) Head-to-head away goals scored; 6) Goal difference; 7) Goals scored.
(C) Champions; (D) Disqualified; (Q) Qualified for the phase indicated

=== Constanța County ===
==== East Series ====
Pos	Team	Pld	W	D	L	GF	GA	GD	Pts	Qualification
1	CFR Constanța	20	18	1	1	89	23	+66	55	Qualification to championship play-off
2	Eforie	20	16	1	3	63	27	+36	49	Qualification to championship play-off
3	Portul Constanța	20	12	3	5	48	17	+31	39	Qualification to championship play-off
4	Unirea Topraisar	20	11	3	6	43	25	+18	36	Qualification to championship play-off
5	Sparta Techirghiol	20	9	5	6	49	38	+11	32	Qualification to championship play-off
6	Agigea	20	8	4	8	52	42	+10	28	Qualification to championship play-off
7	Litoral Corbu	20	7	2	11	32	43	−11	23	Qualification to championship play-out
8	Victoria Cumpăna	20	5	2	13	31	55	−24	17	Qualification to championship play-out
9	Vulturii Cazino Constanța	20	4	4	12	40	66	−26	16	Qualification to championship play-out
10	Cogealac	20	4	3	13	32	55	−23	15	Qualification to championship play-out
11	Aurora 23 August	20	1	2	17	31	119	−88	5	Qualification to championship play-out

Rules for classification: 1) Points; 2) Head-to-head points; 3) Head-to-head goal difference; 4) Head-to-head goals scored; 5) Head-to-head away goals scored; 6) Goal difference; 7) Goals scored.

==== West Series ====
Pos	Team	Pld	W	D	L	GF	GA	GD	Pts	Qualification
1	Mihail Kogălniceanu	18	13	3	2	62	34	+28	42	Qualification to championship play-off
2	Ovidiu	18	12	4	2	55	19	+36	40	Qualification to championship play-off
3	Gloria Băneasa	18	10	2	6	48	26	+22	32	Qualification to championship play-off
4	Perla Murfatlar	18	9	4	5	39	30	+9	31	Qualification to championship play-off
5	Axiopolis Cernavodă	18	7	3	8	42	24	+18	24	Qualification to championship play-off
6	Știința ACALAB Poarta Albă	18	6	4	8	28	43	−15	22	Qualification to championship play-off
7	Progresul Medgidia	18	4	8	6	45	39	+6	20	Qualification to championship play-out
8	Recolta Nicolae Bălcescu	18	5	2	11	39	77	−38	17	Qualification to championship play-out
9	Carsium Hârșova	18	4	4	10	28	61	−33	16	Qualification to championship play-out
10	Voința Valu lui Traian	18	3	0	15	29	62	−33	9	Qualification to championship play-out
11	Carvăn Lipnița (D)	0	0	0	0	0	0	0	0 (Note: Carvăn Lipnița withdrew from the championship after one round and its result were canceled.)	Withdrew

Rules for classification: 1) Points; 2) Head-to-head points; 3) Head-to-head goal difference; 4) Head-to-head goals scored; 5) Head-to-head away goals scored; 6) Goal difference; 7) Goals scored.
(D) Disqualified

==== Championship play-off ====
The teams from the West series started the play-off with all the records achieved in the regular season and the teams from East series started the play-off without the results against Aurora 23 August. The reason is the difference of matches played between the two series, 20 in the East and 18 in the West. The teams played only against the teams from the other series.

Pos	Team	Pld	W	D	L	GF	GA	GD	Pts	Qualification
1	CFR Constanța (C, Q)	30	25	1	4	122	35	+87	76	Qualification to promotion play-off
2	Eforie	30	23	2	5	96	41	+55	71	
3	Unirea Topraisar	30	16	6	8	63	40	+23	54	
4	Mihail Kogălniceanu	30	15	6	9	86	79	+7	51	
5	Agigea	30	15	5	10	87	65	+22	50	
6	Gloria Băneasa	30	16	2	12	74	54	+20	50	
7	Ovidiu	30	14	6	10	75	52	+23	48	
8	Portul Constanța	30	13	7	10	52	44	+8	46	
9	Sparta Techirghiol	30	13	6	11	63	66	−3	45	
10	Axiopolis Cernavodă	30	12	7	11	61	39	+22	43	
11	Perla Murfatlar	30	10	4	16	57	94	−37	34	
12	Știința ACALAB Poarta Albă	30	9	5	16	43	78	−35	32	

Rules for classification: 1) Points; 2) Head-to-head points; 3) Head-to-head goal difference; 4) Head-to-head goals scored; 5) Head-to-head away goals scored; 6) Goal difference; 7) Goals scored.
(C) Champions; (Q) Qualified for the phase indicated

==== Championship play-out ====
The teams started the play-out with all the records achieved in the regular season and played only against the teams from the other series.

Pos	Team	Pld	W	D	L	GF	GA	GD	Pts	Relegation
13	Progresul Medgidia	28	13	9	6	113	65	+48	48	
14	Litoral Corbu	28	11	3	14	49	58	−9	36	
15	Recolta Nicolae Bălcescu	28	10	2	16	71	106	−35	32	
16	Carsium Hârșova	28	8	6	14	57	83	−26	30	
17	Vulturii Cazino Constanța	28	7	5	16	66	100	−34	26	
18	Victoria Cumpăna	28	7	4	17	41	71	−30	25	
19	Voința Valu lui Traian	28	8	1	19	57	85	−28	25	
20	Cogealac (R)	28	7	3	18	59	85	−26	24	Relegation to Liga V Constanța
21	Aurora 23 August (R)	28	2	2	24	51	181	−130	8	Relegation to Liga V Constanța

Rules for classification: 1) Points; 2) Head-to-head points; 3) Head-to-head goal difference; 4) Head-to-head goals scored; 5) Head-to-head away goals scored; 6) Goal difference; 7) Goals scored.
(R) Relegated

=== Covasna County ===
Pos	Team	Pld	W	D	L	GF	GA	GD	Pts	Qualification or relegation
1	Sepsi OSK (C, Q)	28	28	0	0	146	13	+133	84	Qualification to promotion play-off
2	Nemere Ghelința	28	20	5	3	93	30	+63	65	
3	Prima Brăduț	28	17	3	8	64	42	+22	54	
4	Viitorul Moacșa	28	16	5	7	77	41	+36	53	
5	Brețcu	28	17	4	7	80	47	+33	49 (Note: Brețcu deducted 6 points.)	
6	Ojdula	28	14	3	11	78	62	+16	45	
7	Avântul Ilieni	28	12	3	13	68	64	+4	39	
8	Perko Sânzieni	28	10	7	11	43	40	+3	37	
9	Stăruința Bodoc	28	11	2	15	43	65	−22	35	
10	Baraolt	28	9	4	15	57	77	−20	31	
11	Progresul Sita Buzăului	28	9	1	18	54	107	−53	28	
12	Ciucașul Întorsura Buzăului	28	7	5	16	40	88	−48	26	
13	BSE Belin	28	7	4	17	47	87	−40	25	
14	Venus Ozun	28	5	6	17	43	86	−43	21	
15	Covasna (R)	28	2	0	26	19	103	−84	6	Relegation to Liga V Covasna
16	Dolores Venus Covasna (D)	0	0	0	0	0	0	0	0 (Note: Dolores Venus Covasna was excluded from championship and all its results were canceled.)	Withdrew

Rules for classification: 1) Points; 2) Head-to-head points; 3) Head-to-head goal difference; 4) Head-to-head goals scored; 5) Head-to-head away goals scored; 6) Goal difference; 7) Goals scored.
(C) Champions; (D) Disqualified; (Q) Qualified for the phase indicated; (R) Relegated

=== Dâmbovița County ===
Pos	Team	Pld	W	D	L	GF	GA	GD	Pts	Qualification or relegation
1	Aninoasa (C, Q)	32	25	4	3	128	30	+98	79 (Note: Flacăra Moreni–Aninoasa 0–2; Aninoasa–Flacăra Moreni 2–3)	Qualification to promotion play-off
2	Flacăra Moreni	32	26	1	5	118	21	+97	79	
3	Bradul Moroeni	32	22	3	7	90	34	+56	69	
4	Atletic Fieni	32	19	5	8	95	43	+52	62	
5	Recolta Gura Șuții	32	18	4	10	79	58	+21	58	
6	Voința Perșinari	32	18	3	11	77	59	+18	57	
7	Petrolul Târgoviște	32	16	3	13	78	79	−1	51	
8	Comerțul Brezoaele	32	14	5	13	87	73	+14	47	
9	Luceafărul Dragomirești	32	12	2	18	68	95	−27	38	
10	Voința Crevedia	32	11	3	18	64	103	−39	36	
11	Voința Steaua Pietroșița	32	11	3	18	63	102	−39	36	
12	Avântul Produlești	32	10	5	17	51	68	−17	35	
13	PAS Pucioasa	32	10	5	17	48	75	−27	35	
14	Unirea Cobia	32	10	4	18	52	93	−41	34	
15	Avicola Tărtășești	32	10	1	21	48	87	−39	31	
16	Doicești (R)	32	5	5	22	44	108	−64	20	Relegation to Liga V Dâmbovița
17	Petrolul Valea Mare (R)	32	6	0	26	30	92	−62	18	Relegation to Liga V Dâmbovița
18	Gaz Metan Finta (D)	0	0	0	0	0	0	0	0 (Note: Gaz Metan Finta withdrew after 6 rounds and all its results were canceled.)	Withdrew

Rules for classification: 1) Points; 2) Head-to-head points; 3) Head-to-head goal difference; 4) Head-to-head goals scored; 5) Head-to-head away goals scored; 6) Goal difference; 7) Goals scored.
(C) Champions; (D) Disqualified; (Q) Qualified for the phase indicated; (R) Relegated

=== Dolj County ===
==== Regular season ====
Pos	Team	Pld	W	D	L	GF	GA	GD	Pts	Qualification or relegation
1	Filiași (Q)	28	20	6	2	82	21	+61	66	Qualification to play-off
2	Dunărea Calafat (Q)	28	19	5	4	92	32	+60	62	Qualification to play-off
3	Dunărea Bistreț (Q)	28	19	4	5	73	37	+36	61	Qualification to play-off
4	Progresul Segarcea (Q)	28	16	4	8	73	46	+27	52	Qualification to play-off
5	Prometeu Craiova	28	15	6	7	74	45	+29	51	
6	Recolta Ostroveni	28	15	4	9	59	51	+8	49	
7	Viitorul Cârcea	28	14	3	11	61	44	+17	45	
8	Danubius Bechet	28	10	8	10	54	59	−5	38	
9	Universitatea Craiova II	28	10	5	13	62	54	+8	35	
10	Amaradia Melinești	28	7	9	12	46	78	−32	30	
11	Ișalnița	28	8	4	16	41	60	−19	28	
12	ȘF "Gică Popescu" Craiova	28	7	5	16	51	62	−11	26	
13	Vânătorul Desa	28	8	2	18	49	141	−92	26	
14	Victoria Celaru	28	7	2	19	63	81	−18	23	
15	Unirea Leamna	28	1	1	26	40	109	−69	4	
16	Avocații Craiova (D)	0	0	0	0	0	0	0	0 (Note: Avocații Craiova withdrew in the first part of the season and all its results were canceled.)	Withdrew

Rules for classification: 1) Points; 2) Head-to-head points; 3) Head-to-head goal difference; 4) Head-to-head goals scored; 5) Head-to-head away goals scored; 6) Goal difference; 7) Goals scored.
(D) Disqualified; (Q) Qualified for the phase indicated

==== Championship play-off ====
The results between the qualified teams was maintained in the championship play-off.

Pos	Team	Pld	W	D	L	GF	GA	GD	Pts	Qualification
1	Filiași (C, Q)	12	7	4	1	24	10	+14	25	Qualification for promotion play-off
2	Dunărea Calafat	12	6	3	3	22	17	+5	21	
3	Dunărea Bistreț	12	4	1	7	19	21	−2	13	
4	Progresul Segarcea	12	2	2	8	14	31	−17	8	

Rules for classification: 1) Points; 2) Head-to-head points; 3) Head-to-head goal difference; 4) Head-to-head goals scored; 5) Head-to-head away goals scored; 6) Goal difference; 7) Goals scored.
(C) Champions; (Q) Qualified for the phase indicated

=== Galați County ===
Pos	Team	Pld	W	D	L	GF	GA	GD	Pts	Qualification or relegation
1	Metalosport Galați (C, Q)	26	22	2	2	119	31	+88	68	Qualification to promotion play-off
2	Gloria Ivești	27	18	2	7	90	35	+55	56	
3	Unirea Braniștea	27	16	3	8	66	38	+28	51	
4	Avântul Vânatori	27	16	2	9	58	44	+14	50	
5	Avântul Valea Mărului	27	15	4	8	76	44	+32	49	
6	Viitorul Costache Negri	26	12	6	8	56	56	0	42	
7	Quantum Club Galați	27	12	3	12	66	60	+6	39	
8	Victoria Independența	27	12	3	12	44	58	−14	39	
9	Avântul Drăgănești	27	10	4	13	67	77	−10	34	
10	Fulgerul Smulți	27	10	4	13	53	78	−25	34	
11	Muncitorul Ghidigeni	27	10	3	14	67	75	−8	33	
12	Avântul Matca	27	10	3	14	51	65	−14	33	
13	Juventus 2007 Toflea	27	8	2	17	49	72	−23	26	
14	Sporting Tecuci (D)	14	1	2	11	12	39	−27	5 (Note: Sporting Tecuci withdrew during the winter break.)	Withdrew
15	Bujorii Târgu Bujor	27	1	1	25	35	137	−102	4	
16	Unirea Hanu Conachi (D)	0	0	0	0	0	0	0	0 (Note: Unirea Hanu Conachi withdrew in the first part of the season and all its results were canceled.)	Withdrew

Rules for classification: 1) Points; 2) Head-to-head points; 3) Head-to-head goal difference; 4) Head-to-head goals scored; 5) Head-to-head away goals scored; 6) Goal difference; 7) Goals scored.
(C) Champions; (D) Disqualified; (Q) Qualified for the phase indicated

=== Giurgiu County ===
==== South Series ====
Pos	Team	Pld	W	D	L	GF	GA	GD	Pts	Qualification or relegation
1	Viitorul Vedea (Q)	22	15	6	1	61	24	+37	51	Qualification to championship play-off
2	Dunărea Giurgiu (Q)	22	14	2	6	58	23	+35	44	Qualification to championship play-off
3	Prundu	22	13	3	6	75	47	+28	42	
4	Spicul Izvoru	22	13	3	6	57	34	+23	42	
5	Real Vărăști	22	11	2	9	58	56	+2	35	
6	Real Colibași	22	11	1	10	49	64	−15	34	
7	Voința Slobozia	22	9	1	12	69	77	−8	28	
8	Arsenal Malu	22	8	2	12	60	44	+16	26	
9	Nova Force Giurgiu	22	7	2	13	30	44	−14	23 (Note: Nova Force Giurgiu withdrew in the second part of the season and lost all remaining matches with 0–3.)	
10	Dunărea Oinacu	22	6	3	13	26	49	−23	21	
11	Argeșul Hotarele	22	5	2	15	37	71	−34	15 (Note: Argeșul Hotarele deducted 2 points.)	
12	Scărișoara	22	6	1	15	44	75	−31	10 (Note: Scărișoara deducted 9 points.)	

Rules for classification: 1) Points; 2) Head-to-head points; 3) Head-to-head goal difference; 4) Head-to-head goals scored; 5) Head-to-head away goals scored; 6) Goal difference; 7) Goals scored.
(Q) Qualified for the phase indicated

==== North Series ====
Pos	Team	Pld	W	D	L	GF	GA	GD	Pts	Qualification or relegation
1	Petrolul Roata Cartojani (Q)	22	15	5	2	56	18	+38	50	Qualification to championship play-off
2	Mihai Viteazu Călugăreni (Q)	22	15	4	3	64	26	+38	49	Qualification to championship play-off
3	Bolintin Malu Spart	22	11	4	7	64	55	+9	37	
4	Argeșul Mihăilești	22	10	6	6	44	26	+18	36	
5	Unirea Izvoarele	22	9	7	6	56	46	+10	34	
6	Avântul Florești	22	9	4	9	52	49	+3	31	
7	Unirea Cosoba	22	8	5	9	42	33	+9	27 (Note: Unirea Cosoba deducted 2 points.)	
8	Crevedia Mare	22	7	4	11	38	70	−32	25	
9	Silver Inter Zorile	22	6	4	12	56	56	0	22	
10	Zmeii Ogrezeni	22	6	3	13	59	77	−18	21	
11	Luceafărul Trestieni	22	5	5	12	44	86	−42	20	
12	Buturugeni	22	4	3	15	39	63	−24	15	

Rules for classification: 1) Points; 2) Head-to-head points; 3) Head-to-head goal difference; 4) Head-to-head goals scored; 5) Head-to-head away goals scored; 6) Goal difference; 7) Goals scored.
(Q) Qualified for the phase indicated

==== Championship play-off ====
The championship play-off played between the best two ranked teams in each series of the regular season. All matches were played at Comunal Stadium in Izvoarele on 31 May and 1 June 2014 the semi-finals and on 4 June 2014 the final.

===== Semi-finals =====
Team 1	Score	Team 2
Petrolul Roata Cartojani	2–0	Dunărea Giurgiu
Viitorul Vedea	0–1	Mihai Viteazu Călugăreni

===== Final =====
Team 1	Score	Team 2
Petrolul Roata Cartojani	1–1 (7–6 p)	Mihai Viteazu Călugăreni

Petrolul Roata Cartojani won the 2013–14 Liga IV Giurgiu County and qualify to promotion play-off in Liga III.

=== Gorj County ===
Pos	Team	Pld	W	D	L	GF	GA	GD	Pts	Qualification or relegation
1	Gilortul Târgu Cărbunești (C, Q)	26	23	2	1	109	18	+91	71	Qualification to promotion play-off
2	Unirea Crușeț	26	21	1	4	81	37	+44	64	
3	Internațional Bălești	26	18	3	5	66	20	+46	57	
4	Vulturii Fărcășești	26	16	4	6	52	39	+13	52	
5	Parângul Sadu	26	16	3	7	61	37	+24	51	
6	Petrofac Țicleni	26	15	2	9	62	32	+30	47	
7	Minerul Mătăsari II	26	12	7	7	54	35	+19	43	
8	Petrolul Stoina	26	6	7	13	34	54	−20	25	
9	Știința Hurezeni	26	7	2	17	41	64	−23	23	
10	Viitorul Negomir	26	7	2	17	41	65	−24	23	
11	Știința Turceni II	26	6	3	17	41	83	−42	21	
12	Energetica Tismana	26	6	1	19	37	83	−46	19	
13	Stejari (R)	26	5	2	19	34	77	−43	17	Relegation to Liga V Gorj
14	Pandurii Padeș (R)	26	4	1	21	29	98	−69	13	Relegation to Liga V Gorj

Rules for classification: 1) Points; 2) Head-to-head points; 3) Head-to-head goal difference; 4) Head-to-head goals scored; 5) Head-to-head away goals scored; 6) Goal difference; 7) Goals scored.
(C) Champions; (Q) Qualified for the phase indicated; (R) Relegated

=== Harghita County ===
Pos	Team	Pld	W	D	L	GF	GA	GD	Pts	Qualification or relegation
1	Miercurea Ciuc (C, Q)	22	20	1	1	116	14	+102	61	Qualification to promotion play-off
2	Odorheiu Secuiesc	22	17	2	3	78	26	+52	53	
3	Roseal Odorheiu Secuiesc	22	12	3	7	54	36	+18	39	
4	Hargita Cârța	22	11	4	7	40	35	+5	37	
5	Unirea Cristuru Secuiesc	22	11	2	9	43	46	−3	35	
6	Metalul Vlăhița	22	9	4	9	59	45	+14	31	
7	Știința Sărmaș Toplița	22	9	4	9	51	51	0	31	
8	Viitorul Gheorgheni	22	9	2	11	47	40	+7	29	
9	MÜ Frumoasa	22	8	1	13	36	70	−34	25	
10	Lunca de Sus	22	6	3	13	36	72	−36	21	
11	Praid (R)	22	3	2	17	19	81	−62	11	Relegation to Liga V Harghita
12	Homorod Merești (R)	22	3	0	19	34	97	−63	9	Relegation to Liga V Harghita

Rules for classification: 1) Points; 2) Head-to-head points; 3) Head-to-head goal difference; 4) Head-to-head goals scored; 5) Head-to-head away goals scored; 6) Goal difference; 7) Goals scored.
(C) Champions; (Q) Qualified for the phase indicated; (R) Relegated

=== Hunedoara County ===
Pos	Team	Pld	W	D	L	GF	GA	GD	Pts	Qualification or relegation
1	Retezatul Hațeg (C, Q)	30	24	5	1	116	18	+98	77	Qualification to promotion play-off
2	Hercules Lupeni	30	21	5	4	87	23	+64	68	
3	Cetate Deva	30	17	6	7	64	39	+25	57	
4	Gloria Geoagiu	30	17	4	9	71	50	+21	55	
5	Dacia Orăștie	30	16	4	10	55	49	+6	52	
6	Aurul Certej	30	16	3	11	58	51	+7	51	
7	Vulcan	30	16	3	11	63	47	+16	51	
8	Jiul Petroșani	30	12	8	10	33	30	+3	44	
9	Aurul Brad	30	12	6	12	49	44	+5	42	
10	Șoimul Băița	30	10	10	10	55	66	−11	40	
11	Victoria Călan	30	9	8	13	47	63	−16	35	
12	Universitatea Petroșani	30	10	4	16	45	66	−21	34	
13	Minerul Uricani	30	6	7	17	42	70	−28	25	
14	Metalul Crișcior	30	5	5	20	39	71	−32	20	
15	Inter Petrila	30	5	5	20	37	82	−45	20	
16	CFR Simeria	30	1	3	26	14	106	−92	6	

Rules for classification: 1) Points; 2) Head-to-head points; 3) Head-to-head goal difference; 4) Head-to-head goals scored; 5) Head-to-head away goals scored; 6) Goal difference; 7) Goals scored.
(C) Champions; (Q) Qualified for the phase indicated

=== Ialomița County ===
Pos	Team	Pld	W	D	L	GF	GA	GD	Pts	Qualification or relegation
1	Unirea Fierbinți (C, Q)	30	24	2	4	119	42	+77	74	Qualification to promotion play-off
2	Victoria Țăndărei	30	22	6	2	86	29	+57	72	
3	Voința Reviga	30	18	6	6	97	48	+49	60	
4	Recolta Gheorghe Doja	30	17	9	4	86	45	+41	60	
5	Victoria Munteni-Buzău	30	15	8	7	66	54	+12	53	
6	Recolta Gheorghe Lazăr	30	16	2	12	71	56	+15	50	
7	Abatorul Slobozia	30	13	4	13	89	71	+18	43	
8	Viticola Agrofam Fetești	30	12	6	12	86	73	+13	42	
9	Rădulești	30	13	2	15	75	86	−11	41	
10	Amara	30	11	2	17	75	93	−18	35	
11	Andrias Andrășești	30	8	5	17	49	75	−26	29	
12	Spicul Colilia	30	8	4	18	60	87	−27	28	
13	Unirea Grivița (R)	30	7	5	18	52	111	−59	26	Relegation to Liga V Ialomița
14	Viitorul Platonești (R)	30	8	1	21	75	112	−37	25	Relegation to Liga V Ialomița
15	Căzănești (R)	30	6	7	17	45	103	−58	25	Relegation to Liga V Ialomița
16	Unirea Sărățeni (R)	30	5	5	20	62	108	−46	20	Relegation to Liga V Ialomița

Rules for classification: 1) Points; 2) Head-to-head points; 3) Head-to-head goal difference; 4) Head-to-head goals scored; 5) Head-to-head away goals scored; 6) Goal difference; 7) Goals scored.
(C) Champions; (Q) Qualified for the phase indicated; (R) Relegated

=== Iași County ===
Pos	Team	Pld	W	D	L	GF	GA	GD	Pts	Qualification or relegation
1	Rapid Dumești (C, Q)	30	25	5	0	108	24	+84	80	Qualification to promotion play-off
2	Viitorul Târgu Frumos	30	21	5	4	97	31	+66	68	
3	Siretul Lespezi	30	18	6	6	81	33	+48	60	
4	Tomești	30	18	4	8	82	42	+40	58	
5	Unirea Mircești	30	17	4	9	53	54	−1	55	
6	Venus Butea	30	16	4	10	69	51	+18	52 (Note: Stejarul Sinești–Venus Butea 1–1; Venus Butea–Stejarul Sinești 5–0)	
7	Stejarul Sinești	30	17	1	12	65	52	+13	52	
8	Viitorul Hârlău	30	15	4	11	55	49	+6	49	
9	Unirea Ruginoasa	30	10	6	14	41	60	−19	36	
10	Gloria Balș	30	11	2	17	45	60	−15	35	
11	Viitorul Lungani	30	10	4	16	49	57	−8	34	
12	Holboca	30	7	8	15	42	67	−25	29	
13	Gloria Bălțați	30	8	4	18	46	66	−20	28	
14	Foresta Ciurea (R)	30	5	3	22	36	104	−68	18 (Note: Foresta Ciurea–Podgoria Cotnari 3–0; Podgoria Cotnari–Foresta Ciurea 2–2)	Relegation to Liga V Iași
15	Podgoria Cotnari (R)	30	5	3	22	32	83	−51	18	Relegation to Liga V Iași
16	Kosarom Pașcani II (R)	30	4	3	23	36	104	−68	15	Relegation to Liga V Iași

Rules for classification: 1) Points; 2) Head-to-head points; 3) Head-to-head goal difference; 4) Head-to-head goals scored; 5) Head-to-head away goals scored; 6) Goal difference; 7) Goals scored.
(C) Champions; (Q) Qualified for the phase indicated; (R) Relegated

=== Ilfov County ===
Pos	Team	Pld	W	D	L	GF	GA	GD	Pts	Qualification or relegation
1	Voința Snagov (Q)	22	19	1	2	94	23	+71	58	Qualification to championship play-off
2	Vulturul Pasărea (Q)	22	18	2	2	91	23	+68	56	Qualification to championship play-off
3	Viitorul Dragomirești (Q)	22	15	3	4	88	33	+55	48	Qualification to championship play-off
4	Ciorogârla (Q)	22	11	5	6	68	34	+34	38	Qualification to championship play-off
5	Pescărușul Grădiștea	22	11	2	9	43	32	+11	35	
6	Viitorul Domnești II	22	9	7	6	49	46	+3	34	
7	Măgurele	22	10	3	9	51	50	+1	33	
8	Codrii Vlăsiei Moara Vlăsiei	22	6	2	14	36	64	−28	20	
9	Viitorul Găneasa	22	6	2	14	36	85	−49	20	
10	Glina	22	5	2	15	39	114	−75	17	
11	Voința Periș	22	4	0	18	27	71	−44	12	
12	Sinești	22	3	1	18	21	63	−42	10	

Rules for classification: 1) Points; 2) Head-to-head points; 3) Head-to-head goal difference; 4) Head-to-head goals scored; 5) Head-to-head away goals scored; 6) Goal difference; 7) Goals scored.
(Q) Qualified for the phase indicated

==== Championship play-off ====
Championship play-off played in a single round-robin tournament between the best four teams of the regular season. The teams started the play-off with the following points: 1st place – 3 points, 2nd place – 2 points, 3rd place – 1 point, 4th place – 0 points.

Pos	Team	Pld	W	D	L	GF	GA	GD	Pts	Qualification
1	Voința Snagov (C, Q)	3	3	0	0	5	0	+5	12	Qualification for promotion play-off
2	Viitorul Dragomirești	3	2	0	1	2	1	+1	7	
3	Vulturul Pasărea	3	0	1	2	4	7	−3	3	
4	Ciorogârla	3	0	1	2	4	7	−3	1	

Rules for classification: 1) Points; 2) Head-to-head points; 3) Head-to-head goal difference; 4) Head-to-head goals scored; 5) Head-to-head away goals scored; 6) Goal difference; 7) Goals scored.
(C) Champions; (Q) Qualified for the phase indicated

=== Maramureș County ===
==== North Series ====
Pos	Team	Pld	W	D	L	GF	GA	GD	Pts	Qualification or relegation
1	Sighetu Marmației (Q)	24	24	0	0	152	16	+136	72	Qualification to championship final
2	Iza Dragomirești	24	21	1	2	114	33	+81	64	
3	Zorile Moisei	24	17	1	6	72	38	+34	52	
4	Bradul Vișeu de Sus	24	14	3	7	81	49	+32	45	
5	Avântul Bârsana	23	14	1	8	67	44	+23	43	
6	Rozalina Rozavlea	24	8	6	10	53	66	−13	30	
7	Remeți	24	9	3	12	49	66	−17	30	
8	Salina Ocna Șugatag	23	8	2	13	57	71	−14	26	
9	Dumiart Bogdan Vodă	24	8	2	14	41	73	−32	26	
10	Recolta Săliștea de Sus	24	8	1	15	36	94	−58	25	
11	Luceafărul Strâmtura	24	5	3	16	44	80	−36	18	
12	Foresta Câmpulung la Tisa	24	3	2	19	23	93	−70	11	
13	Brișca Sarasău	24	3	1	20	33	97	−64	10	

Rules for classification: 1) Points; 2) Head-to-head points; 3) Head-to-head goal difference; 4) Head-to-head goals scored; 5) Head-to-head away goals scored; 6) Goal difference; 7) Goals scored.
(Q) Qualified for the phase indicated

==== South Series ====
Pos	Team	Pld	W	D	L	GF	GA	GD	Pts	Qualification or relegation
1	CSȘ 2 Speranța Coltău (Q)	24	20	3	1	95	15	+80	63	Qualification to championship final
2	Spicul Ardusat	24	19	4	1	85	27	+58	61	
3	Viitorul Ulmeni	24	16	4	4	76	35	+41	52	
4	Progresul Șomcuta Mare	24	15	1	8	59	45	+14	46	
5	Comuna Recea	24	12	2	10	64	43	+21	38	
6	Fărcașa	24	12	2	10	61	46	+15	38	
7	Seini	24	9	5	10	44	47	−3	32	
8	Baia Mare II	24	10	2	12	47	47	0	32	
9	Unirea Șișești	24	9	2	13	52	59	−7	29	
10	Lăpușul Târgu Lăpuș	24	8	2	14	41	74	−33	26	
11	Minerul Cavnic	24	5	3	16	33	71	−38	18	
12	Vectrix Satulung	24	4	2	18	33	101	−68	14	
13	Bradul Groșii Țibleșului	24	0	2	22	13	93	−80	2	

Rules for classification: 1) Points; 2) Head-to-head points; 3) Head-to-head goal difference; 4) Head-to-head goals scored; 5) Head-to-head away goals scored; 6) Goal difference; 7) Goals scored.
(Q) Qualified for the phase indicated

==== Championship final ====
The championship final was played on 5 June 2014 at Viorel Mateianu Stadium in Baia Mare.

Team 1	Score	Team 2
Sighetu Marmației	0–0 (5–4 p)	CSȘ 2 Speranța Coltău

Sighetu Marmației won the 2013–14 Liga IV Maramureș County and qualify to promotion play-off in Liga III.

=== Mehedinți County ===
Pos	Team	Pld	W	D	L	GF	GA	GD	Pts	Qualification or relegation
1	Minerul Mehedinți (C, Q)	26	24	2	0	99	9	+90	74	Qualification to promotion play-off
2	Recolta Dănceu	26	20	2	4	113	32	+81	62	
3	Drobeta 2013	26	18	2	6	84	31	+53	56	
4	Dunărea Gruia	26	15	1	10	49	42	+7	46	
5	Baia de Aramă	26	14	2	10	47	53	−6	44	
6	Strehaia	26	12	3	11	53	46	+7	39	
7	Pandurii Cerneți	26	12	3	11	61	58	+3	39	
8	Corcova	26	13	0	13	57	55	+2	39	
9	Phoenix Izvorul Bârzii	26	12	3	11	43	45	−2	39 (Note: Phoenix Izvorul Bârzii, Agromec Șimian, Dunărea Pristol and Kladova Drobeta-Turnu Severin withdrew from the championship and lost all the remaining matches with 0–3.)	
10	Real Vânju Mare	26	8	3	15	48	75	−27	27	
11	Viitorul Cujmir	26	7	5	14	28	58	−30	26	
12	Agromec Șimian	26	7	1	18	28	72	−44	22	
13	Dunărea Pristol	26	2	1	23	17	77	−60	7	
14	Kladova Drobeta-Turnu Severin	26	2	0	24	16	102	−86	6	

Rules for classification: 1) Points; 2) Head-to-head points; 3) Head-to-head goal difference; 4) Head-to-head goals scored; 5) Head-to-head away goals scored; 6) Goal difference; 7) Goals scored.
(C) Champions; (Q) Qualified for the phase indicated

=== Mureș County ===
Pos	Team	Pld	W	D	L	GF	GA	GD	Pts	Qualification or relegation
1	Iernut (C, Q)	34	31	1	2	167	38	+129	94	Qualification to promotion play-off
2	Înfrățirea Valea Izvoarelor	34	28	3	3	132	39	+93	87	
3	ASA 2013 Târgu Mureș II	34	23	4	7	123	52	+71	73	
4	Mureșul Luduș	34	21	4	9	112	38	+74	67	
5	Lacul Ursu Mobila Sovata	34	21	4	9	88	45	+43	67	
6	Viitorul Ungheni	34	18	7	9	123	58	+65	61	
7	Gaz Metan Târgu Mureș	34	19	4	11	84	51	+33	61	
8	Gliga Companies Reghin	34	17	5	12	104	71	+33	56	
9	Miercurea Nirajului	34	17	3	14	104	81	+23	54	
10	Avântul Miheșu de Câmpie	34	15	6	13	79	65	+14	51	
11	Mureșul Nazna	34	13	4	17	63	73	−10	43	
12	Mureșul Rușii-Munți	34	12	4	18	76	74	+2	40	
13	Sărmașu	34	11	5	18	57	106	−49	38	
14	Arena Sighișoara	34	9	0	25	53	196	−143	27	
15	Mureșul Cuci	34	7	4	23	48	97	−49	25	
16	Gaz Metan Daneș	34	6	2	26	60	131	−71	20 (Note: Gaz Metan Daneș was spared from relegation due to the promotion of Iernut in Liga III.)	Spared from relegation
17	Unirea Iclănzel (R)	34	4	1	29	42	173	−131	13	Relegation to Liga V Mureș
18	MSE 08 Târgu Mureș (R)	34	3	1	30	38	165	−127	10	Relegation to Liga V Mureș

Rules for classification: 1) Points; 2) Head-to-head points; 3) Head-to-head goal difference; 4) Head-to-head goals scored; 5) Head-to-head away goals scored; 6) Goal difference; 7) Goals scored.
(C) Champions; (Q) Qualified for the phase indicated; (R) Relegated

=== Neamț County ===
Pos	Team	Pld	W	D	L	GF	GA	GD	Pts	Qualification or relegation
1	Victoria Horia (Q)	22	18	2	2	84	19	+65	56	Qualification to championship play-off
2	Voința Ion Creangă (Q)	22	18	1	3	102	21	+81	55	Qualification to championship play-off
3	Speranța Răucești (Q)	22	16	2	4	83	27	+56	50	Qualification to championship play-off
4	Moldova Cordun (Q)	22	16	2	4	71	25	+46	50	Qualification to championship play-off
5	Bradul Borca	22	14	1	7	62	40	+22	43	
6	Bradul Roznov	22	11	1	10	60	47	+13	34	
7	Spicul Tămășeni	22	8	1	13	43	57	−14	25	
8	Viitorul Podoleni	22	7	1	14	32	76	−44	22	
9	Siretul Doljești	22	5	2	15	38	74	−36	17	
10	Viitorul Săbăoani	21	4	2	15	20	46	−26	14 (Note: Viitorul Săbăoani and Energia Pângărați withdrew after 11 rounds and lost all the remaining matches with 0–3.)	
11	LPS Roman	22	3	1	18	26	139	−113	10	
12	Energia Pângărați	21	3	0	18	18	68	−50	9	

Rules for classification: 1) Points; 2) Head-to-head points; 3) Head-to-head goal difference; 4) Head-to-head goals scored; 5) Head-to-head away goals scored; 6) Goal difference; 7) Goals scored.
(Q) Qualified for the phase indicated

==== Championship play-off ====
Championship play-off played in a single round-robin tournament between the best four teams of the regular season. The teams started the play-off with the following points: 1st place – 3 points, 2nd place – 2 points, 3rd place – 1 point, 4th place – 0 points.

All matches were played at Constantinescu Nehoi Stadium from Roman.

Pos	Team	Pld	W	D	L	GF	GA	GD	Pts	Qualification	VIC	MCO	SPR	VHO
1	Voința Ion Creangă (C, Q)	3	3	0	0	8	1	+7	11	Qualification for promotion play-off	—	1–0	5–0	—
2	Moldova Cordun	3	2	0	1	4	1	+3	6		—	—	—	—
3	Speranța Răucești	3	1	0	2	1	8	−7	4		—	0–3	—	—
4	Victoria Horia	3	0	0	3	1	4	−3	3		1–2	0–1	0–1	—

Rules for classification: 1) Points; 2) Head-to-head points; 3) Head-to-head goal difference; 4) Head-to-head goals scored; 5) Head-to-head away goals scored; 6) Goal difference; 7) Goals scored.
(C) Champions; (Q) Qualified for the phase indicated

=== Olt County ===
Pos	Team	Pld	W	D	L	GF	GA	GD	Pts	Qualification or relegation
1	Inter Markus Coteana (C, Q)	28	24	4	0	97	14	+83	76	Qualification to promotion play-off
2	Milcov	28	24	2	2	90	24	+66	74	
3	Vedea Văleni	28	15	8	5	72	36	+36	53	
4	Petrolul Potcoava	28	17	2	9	47	37	+10	53	
5	Viitorul Grădinile	28	15	6	7	75	39	+36	51	
6	Voința 2012 Băbiciu	28	14	4	10	68	54	+14	46	
7	Victoria Dobrun	28	13	7	8	43	43	0	46	
8	Olimpia Rotunda	28	13	6	9	68	50	+18	45	
9	Oltul Drăgănești-Olt	28	11	2	15	45	61	−16	32 (Note: Oltul Drăgănești-Olt deducted 3 points.)	
10	Viitorul Rusănești	28	9	2	17	49	73	−24	29	
11	Oltul Curtișoara	28	8	2	18	58	78	−20	26	
12	Unirea Turia	28	8	2	18	39	64	−25	26	
13	Viitorul Vlădila	28	6	3	19	48	85	−37	21	
14	Olt Scornicești	28	6	2	20	32	85	−53	20	
15	Victoria Dăneasa	28	1	0	27	19	107	−88	3	

Rules for classification: 1) Points; 2) Head-to-head points; 3) Head-to-head goal difference; 4) Head-to-head goals scored; 5) Head-to-head away goals scored; 6) Goal difference; 7) Goals scored.
(C) Champions; (Q) Qualified for the phase indicated

=== Prahova County ===
Pos	Team	Pld	W	D	L	GF	GA	GD	Pts	Qualification or relegation
1	Astra II Ciorani (C, Q)	34	30	3	1	122	27	+95	93	Qualification to promotion play-off
2	Petrolistul Boldești	34	25	5	4	87	30	+57	80	
3	Avântul Măneciu	34	20	3	11	86	53	+33	63	
4	Bănești-Urleta	34	19	3	12	73	51	+22	60	
5	Păulești	34	18	5	11	63	41	+22	59	
6	Plopeni	34	17	6	11	69	55	+14	57	
7	Teleajenul Vălenii de Munte	34	17	5	12	62	46	+16	56	
8	Fortuna Poiana Câmpina II	34	16	6	12	62	53	+9	54	
9	Ploiești	34	15	5	14	56	54	+2	50	
10	Blejoi	34	15	4	15	73	53	+20	49	
11	Progresul Drăgănești	34	14	4	16	66	66	0	46	
12	Tricolorul Breaza	34	13	4	17	58	83	−25	43	
13	Brebu	34	13	4	17	36	52	−16	43	
14	Ceptura	34	13	4	17	60	80	−20	43	
15	Cornu (R)	34	13	3	18	63	77	−14	42	Relegation to Liga V Prahova
16	Unirea Urlați (R)	34	10	3	21	45	76	−31	33	Relegation to Liga V Prahova
17	Caraimanul Bușteni (R)	34	2	1	31	33	119	−86	7	Relegation to Liga V Prahova
18	Rapid Sălciile (R)	34	2	0	32	29	127	−98	6	Relegation to Liga V Prahova

Rules for classification: 1) Points; 2) Head-to-head points; 3) Head-to-head goal difference; 4) Head-to-head goals scored; 5) Head-to-head away goals scored; 6) Goal difference; 7) Goals scored.
(C) Champions; (Q) Qualified for the phase indicated; (R) Relegated

=== Satu Mare County ===
==== Seria A ====
Pos	Team	Pld	W	D	L	GF	GA	GD	Pts	Qualification or relegation
1	Victoria Apa (Q)	30	25	1	4	111	31	+80	76	Qualification to championship final
2	Talna Orașu Nou	30	24	2	4	129	38	+91	74	
3	Turul Micula	30	21	4	5	88	37	+51	67	
4	Recolta Dorolț	30	19	3	8	89	40	+49	60	
5	Sportul Botiz	30	18	6	6	73	37	+36	60	
6	Voința Doba	30	17	3	10	101	55	+46	54 (Note: Voința Doba–Olimpia Satu Mare II 4–2; Olimpia Satu Mare II –Voința Doba 2–2.)	
7	Olimpia Satu Mare II (R)	30	16	6	8	89	43	+46	54	Relegation to Liga V Satu Mare
8	Energia Negrești-Oaș (R)	30	14	3	13	52	53	−1	45	Relegation to Liga V Satu Mare
9	Dacia Medieșu Aurit (R)	30	11	7	12	56	55	+1	40	Relegation to Liga V Satu Mare
10	Livada (R)	30	10	4	16	41	63	−22	34	Relegation to Liga V Satu Mare
11	Someșul Cărășeu (R)	30	10	2	18	34	88	−54	32	Relegation to Liga V Satu Mare
12	Someșul Odoreu (R)	30	8	0	22	44	101	−57	24	Relegation to Liga V Satu Mare
13	Voința Babța (R)	30	7	3	20	45	117	−72	24	Relegation to Liga V Satu Mare
14	Unirea Păulești (R)	30	6	2	22	41	89	−48	20	Relegation to Liga V Satu Mare
15	Prietenia Crucișor (R)	30	5	2	23	39	108	−69	17	Relegation to Liga V Satu Mare
16	Voința Lazuri (R)	30	3	4	23	31	108	−77	13	Relegation to Liga V Satu Mare

Rules for classification: 1) Points; 2) Head-to-head points; 3) Head-to-head goal difference; 4) Head-to-head goals scored; 5) Head-to-head away goals scored; 6) Goal difference; 7) Goals scored.
(Q) Qualified for the phase indicated; (R) Relegated

==== Seria B ====
Pos	Team	Pld	W	D	L	GF	GA	GD	Pts	Qualification or relegation
1	Someșul Oar (Q)	30	26	1	3	168	26	+142	79	Qualification to championship final
2	Schwaben Kalmandi Cămin	30	25	3	2	116	38	+78	78	
3	Viitorul Vetiș	30	24	2	4	107	40	+67	74	
4	Unirea Tășnad	30	19	2	9	97	47	+50	59	
5	Luceafărul Decebal	30	17	2	11	62	61	+1	53	
6	Gloria Moftinu Mare	30	14	9	7	73	37	+36	51	
7	Fortuna Căpleni (R)	30	15	3	12	63	51	+12	48	Relegation to Liga V Satu Mare
8	Schamagosch Ciumești (R)	30	11	2	17	51	80	−29	35	Relegation to Liga V Satu Mare
9	Crasna Moftinu Mic (R)	30	10	4	16	46	76	−30	34	Relegation to Liga V Satu Mare
10	Kneho Urziceni (R)	30	9	7	14	38	70	−32	34	Relegation to Liga V Satu Mare
11	Frohlich Foieni (R)	30	10	3	17	34	77	−43	33	Relegation to Liga V Satu Mare
12	Unirea Pișcolt (R)	30	8	8	14	46	63	−17	32	Relegation to Liga V Satu Mare
13	Real Andrid (R)	30	10	1	19	54	86	−32	31	Relegation to Liga V Satu Mare
14	Recolta Sanislău (R)	30	8	4	18	36	67	−31	28	Relegation to Liga V Satu Mare
15	Stăruința Berveni (R)	30	3	3	24	26	121	−95	12	Relegation to Liga V Satu Mare
16	Victoria Petrești (R)	30	3	2	25	33	110	−77	11	Relegation to Liga V Satu Mare

Rules for classification: 1) Points; 2) Head-to-head points; 3) Head-to-head goal difference; 4) Head-to-head goals scored; 5) Head-to-head away goals scored; 6) Goal difference; 7) Goals scored.
(Q) Qualified for the phase indicated; (R) Relegated

==== Championship final ====
The championship final was played on 7 June 2014 at Olimpia Stadium in Satu Mare.

Team 1	Score	Team 2
Someșul Oar	2–1	Victoria Apa

Someșul Oar won the 2013–14 Liga IV Satu Mare County and qualify to promotion play-off in Liga III.

=== Sălaj County ===
Pos	Team	Pld	W	D	L	GF	GA	GD	Pts	Qualification or relegation
1	Sportul Șimleu Silvaniei (C, Q)	28	24	3	1	127	24	+103	75	Qualification to promotion play-off
2	Dumbrava Gâlgău Almașului	28	20	4	4	117	42	+75	64	
3	Rapid Jibou	28	17	6	5	78	28	+50	57	
4	Unirea Mirșid	28	18	3	7	78	51	+27	57	
5	Luceafărul Bălan	28	17	5	6	101	39	+62	56	
6	Barcău Nușfalău	28	16	2	10	76	61	+15	50	
7	Chieșd	28	11	5	12	70	77	−7	38	
8	Crasna	28	12	2	14	66	73	−7	38	
9	Benfica Ileanda	28	12	0	16	54	71	−17	36	
10	Olimpic Bocșa	28	10	3	15	50	81	−31	33	
11	Favorit Dobrin	28	9	3	16	47	78	−31	30	
12	Silvania Cehu Silvaniei	28	5	6	17	53	101	−48	21	
13	Gloria Bobota	28	6	3	19	42	101	−59	21	
14	Flacăra Halmășd	28	5	3	20	55	131	−76	18	
15	Zalău II	28	3	2	23	41	97	−56	11	
16	Meseșul Treznea (D)	0	0	0	0	0	0	0	0 (Note: Meseșul Treznea withdrew from the championship and all its results were canceled.)	Withdrew

Rules for classification: 1) Points; 2) Head-to-head points; 3) Head-to-head goal difference; 4) Head-to-head goals scored; 5) Head-to-head away goals scored; 6) Goal difference; 7) Goals scored.
(C) Champions; (D) Disqualified; (Q) Qualified for the phase indicated

=== Sibiu County ===
Pos	Team	Pld	W	D	L	GF	GA	GD	Pts	Qualification or relegation
1	Măgura Cisnădie (C, Q)	22	20	1	1	127	10	+117	61	Qualification to promotion play-off
2	Unirea Ocna Sibiului	22	15	2	5	60	40	+20	47	
3	Păltiniș Rășinari	22	13	3	6	62	36	+26	42	
4	Continental Sibiu	22	11	4	7	47	37	+10	37	
5	Sparta Mediaș	22	11	3	8	61	27	+34	36	
6	Agnita	22	10	2	10	47	47	0	32	
7	Unirea Miercurea Sibiului	22	10	2	10	54	56	−2	32	
8	Curciu	22	9	4	9	64	79	−15	31	
9	Tălmaciu	22	6	5	11	21	42	−21	23	
10	Voința Sibiu	22	5	2	15	29	60	−31	17	
11	Progresul Terezian Sibiu	22	5	2	15	32	68	−36	17	
12	ASA Sibiu	22	2	0	20	25	127	−102	6	

Rules for classification: 1) Points; 2) Head-to-head points; 3) Head-to-head goal difference; 4) Head-to-head goals scored; 5) Head-to-head away goals scored; 6) Goal difference; 7) Goals scored.
(C) Champions; (Q) Qualified for the phase indicated

=== Suceava County ===
Pos	Team	Pld	W	D	L	GF	GA	GD	Pts	Qualification or relegation
1	Bradul Putna (C, Q)	26	22	2	2	87	18	+69	68	Qualification to promotion play-off
2	Șomuzul Preutești	26	21	3	2	77	21	+56	66	
3	Bucovina II Frătăuții Noi	26	16	3	7	46	30	+16	51	
4	Șomuz Fălticeni	26	15	2	9	57	46	+11	47	
5	Progresul Frătăuții Vechi	26	14	1	11	58	40	+18	43	
6	Avântul Volovăț	26	10	8	8	49	31	+18	38	
7	Gura Humorului	26	9	8	9	34	23	+11	35	
8	Viitorul Liteni	26	9	5	12	42	53	−11	32	
9	Moldova Drăgușeni	26	9	5	12	53	53	0	32	
10	Minerul Iacobeni	26	8	7	11	44	54	−10	31	
11	Viitorul Verești	26	6	5	15	41	73	−32	23	
12	Zimbrul Siret	26	6	3	17	29	64	−35	21	
13	Voința Stroiești	26	4	5	17	27	88	−61	17	
14	Sporting II Arbore (R)	26	4	1	21	30	80	−50	13 (Note: Sporting II Arbore withdrew from the championship after 19 rounds and lost all remaining matches with 0–3.)	Relegation to Liga V Suceava

Rules for classification: 1) Points; 2) Head-to-head points; 3) Head-to-head goal difference; 4) Head-to-head goals scored; 5) Head-to-head away goals scored; 6) Goal difference; 7) Goals scored.
(C) Champions; (Q) Qualified for the phase indicated; (R) Relegated

=== Teleorman County ===
Pos	Team	Pld	W	D	L	GF	GA	GD	Pts	Qualification or relegation
1	Sporting Roșiori (C, Q)	30	24	6	0	93	15	+78	78	Qualification to promotion play-off
2	Alexandria	30	21	5	4	98	23	+75	68	
3	Pamimai Videle	30	16	5	9	65	36	+29	53	
4	Viață Nouă Olteni	30	14	7	9	54	48	+6	49	
5	Unirea Brânceni	30	12	11	7	42	35	+7	47	
6	Unirea Țigănești	30	13	7	10	56	50	+6	46	
7	Voința Saelele	30	13	5	12	53	52	+1	44	
8	Ajax Botoroaga	30	12	7	11	47	41	+6	43	
9	Astra Plosca	30	12	4	14	46	48	−2	40 (Note: Astra Plosca–Udinese Uda Clocociov 4–1; Udinese Uda Clocociov–Astra Plosca 2–1)	
10	Udinese Uda Clocociov	30	11	7	12	40	43	−3	40	
11	Spicpo Poroschia	30	10	7	13	53	62	−9	37	
12	Dunărea Zimnicea	30	10	6	14	41	64	−23	36	
13	Metalul Peretu	30	9	7	14	41	65	−24	34	
14	Rapid Buzescu	30	10	3	17	58	81	−23	33	
15	Tineretul Suhaia (R)	30	3	4	23	29	93	−64	13	Relegation to Liga V Teleorman
16	Traian (R)	30	2	5	23	23	83	−60	11 (Note: Traian withdrew from the championship after 21 rounds and lost all remaining matches with 0–3.)	Relegation to Liga V Teleorman

Rules for classification: 1) Points; 2) Head-to-head points; 3) Head-to-head goal difference; 4) Head-to-head goals scored; 5) Head-to-head away goals scored; 6) Goal difference; 7) Goals scored.
(C) Champions; (Q) Qualified for the phase indicated; (R) Relegated

=== Timiș County ===
Pos	Team	Pld	W	D	L	GF	GA	GD	Pts	Qualification or relegation
1	Ghiroda (C, Q)	32	28	3	1	107	24	+83	87	Qualification to promotion play-off
2	ASU Politehnica Timișoara	32	27	5	0	114	22	+92	86	
3	Progresul Gătaia	32	20	5	7	79	45	+34	65	
4	Pobeda Dudeștii Vechi	32	18	8	6	79	36	+43	62	
5	Unirea Sânnicolau Mare	32	19	3	10	76	44	+32	60	
6	Dumbrăvița	32	18	4	10	73	41	+32	58	
7	Timișul Șag	32	12	11	9	54	45	+9	47	
8	Auto Timișoara	32	12	4	16	47	54	−7	40	
9	Chișoda	32	11	5	16	59	87	−28	38	
10	Arsenal Flacăra Făget	32	12	2	18	42	85	−43	38	
11	Cocoșul Orțișoara	32	9	8	15	47	51	−4	35	
12	Progresul Racovița	32	10	4	18	53	77	−24	34	
13	Peciu Nou	32	10	3	19	52	69	−17	33	
14	CFR Timișoara	32	8	7	17	58	87	−29	31	
15	Giroc	32	8	2	22	40	80	−40	26	
16	Marcel Băban Jimbolia (R)	32	5	6	21	26	75	−49	21	Relegation to Liga V Timiș
17	Real Dragșina (R)	32	4	2	26	37	121	−84	14	Relegation to Liga V Timiș
18	Banatul Nerău (D)	0	0	0	0	0	0	0	0	Withdrew

Rules for classification: 1) Points; 2) Head-to-head points; 3) Head-to-head goal difference; 4) Head-to-head goals scored; 5) Head-to-head away goals scored; 6) Goal difference; 7) Goals scored.
(C) Champions; (D) Disqualified; (Q) Qualified for the phase indicated; (R) Relegated

=== Tulcea County ===
Pos	Team	Pld	W	D	L	GF	GA	GD	Pts	Qualification or relegation
1	Granitul Babadag (Q)	26	23	2	1	126	20	+106	71	Qualification to championship play-off
2	Delta Dobrogea Tulcea (Q)	26	21	3	2	152	22	+130	66	Qualification to championship play-off
3	Noua Generație Măcin (Q)	26	19	1	6	99	34	+65	58	Qualification to championship play-off
4	Șoimii Topolog (Q)	26	17	1	8	78	42	+36	52	Qualification to championship play-off
5	Luceafărul Slava Cercheză	26	16	3	7	85	45	+40	51	
6	Izbânda Mihail Kogălniceanu	26	12	3	11	69	49	+20	39	
7	Triumf Cerna	26	12	2	12	52	54	−2	38	
8	Viitorul Frecăței	26	12	2	12	54	57	−3	38	
9	Hamangia Baia	26	12	1	13	44	55	−11	37	
10	Pescărușul Sarichioi	26	9	2	15	61	70	−9	29	
11	Razim Jurilovca	25	9	1	15	53	57	−4	28 (Note: Razim Jurilovca and Național Somova withdrew from championship and lost all remaining matches with 0–3.)	
12	Sarica Niculițel	26	3	2	21	35	149	−114	11	
13	Tractorul Horia	26	3	1	22	31	171	−140	10	
14	Național Somova	25	1	0	24	12	126	−114	3	
15	Troesmis Turcoaia (D)	0	0	0	0	0	0	0	0 (Note: Troesmis Turcoaia withdrew in the first part of the season and all its results were canceled.)	Withdrew

Rules for classification: 1) Points; 2) Head-to-head points; 3) Head-to-head goal difference; 4) Head-to-head goals scored; 5) Head-to-head away goals scored; 6) Goal difference; 7) Goals scored.
(D) Disqualified; (Q) Qualified for the phase indicated

==== Championship play-off ====
===== Semi-finals =====
Team 1	Score	Team 2
Granitul Babadag	5–1	Șoimii Topolog
Delta Dobrogea Tulcea	2–0	Noua Generație Măcin

===== Final =====
Team 1	Score	Team 2
Delta Dobrogea Tulcea	2–1	Granitul Babadag

Delta Dobrogea Tulcea won the 2013–14 Liga IV Tulcea County and qualify to promotion play-off in Liga III.

=== Vaslui County ===
==== Seria 1 ====
Pos	Team	Pld	W	D	L	GF	GA	GD	Pts	Qualification or relegation
1	Gârceni (Q)	22	20	1	1	79	21	+58	61	Qualification to championship play-off
2	SMART Negrești (Q)	22	17	2	3	98	29	+69	53	Qualification to championship play-off
3	Viitorul Rebricea	22	16	1	5	80	41	+39	49	
4	Vointa Ștefan cel Mare	22	13	4	5	68	44	+24	43	
5	Vaslui II	21	12	2	7	65	50	+15	38	
6	Victoria 2013 Muntenii de Jos	22	8	7	7	57	42	+15	31	
7	Lipovăț	22	7	5	10	33	48	−15	26	
8	Vulturul Bălteni	22	6	1	15	44	92	−48	19	
9	LPS 2 Vaslui	20	4	6	10	26	53	−27	18	
10	LPS Vaslui	21	4	1	16	35	85	−50	13	
11	Dinamic Boțesti	22	3	3	16	27	70	−43	12	
12	Victoria Muntenii de Jos	22	3	1	18	2	57	−55	10 (Note: Victoria Muntenii de Jos withdrew from the championship.)	

Rules for classification: 1) Points; 2) Head-to-head points; 3) Head-to-head goal difference; 4) Head-to-head goals scored; 5) Head-to-head away goals scored; 6) Goal difference; 7) Goals scored.
(Q) Qualified for the phase indicated

==== Seria 2 ====
Pos	Team	Pld	W	D	L	GF	GA	GD	Pts	Qualification or relegation
1	Juventus Fălciu (Q)	22	19	1	2	97	20	+77	58	Qualification to championship play-off
2	Vitis Șuletea (Q)	22	17	3	2	79	19	+60	54	Qualification to championship play-off
3	Olimpia Stănilești	22	14	4	4	77	28	+49	46	
4	Flacăra Murgeni	21	14	1	6	79	35	+44	43	
5	Foresta Zorleni	22	10	2	10	58	58	0	32	
6	Gloria Lunca Banului	21	11	2	8	49	37	+12	35	
7	Podgoria Oltenești	21	9	3	9	47	48	−1	30	
8	Iulius Bogdănești	21	7	5	9	53	63	−10	26	
9	Unirea Banca	21	6	1	14	47	91	−44	19	
10	FDR Tutova	21	5	1	15	48	107	−59	16	
11	Gloria Puiești	22	3	1	18	26	77	−51	10 (Note: Gloria Puiești withdrew from the championship.)	
12	Multim Perieni	21	2	2	17	23	90	−67	8	

Rules for classification: 1) Points; 2) Head-to-head points; 3) Head-to-head goal difference; 4) Head-to-head goals scored; 5) Head-to-head away goals scored; 6) Goal difference; 7) Goals scored.
(Q) Qualified for the phase indicated

==== Championship play-off ====
Pos	Team	Pld	W	D	L	GF	GA	GD	Pts	Qualification
1	Gârceni (C, Q)	6	4	0	2	12	7	+5	12	Qualification to promotion play-off
2	SMART Negrești	6	4	0	2	20	12	+8	12	
3	Juventus Fălciu	5	2	0	3	11	11	0	6	
4	Vitis Șuletea	5	1	0	4	6	19	−13	3	

Rules for classification: 1) Points; 2) Head-to-head points; 3) Head-to-head goal difference; 4) Head-to-head goals scored; 5) Head-to-head away goals scored; 6) Goal difference; 7) Goals scored.
(C) Champions; (Q) Qualified for the phase indicated

=== Vâlcea County ===
==== North Series ====
Pos	Team	Pld	W	D	L	GF	GA	GD	Pts	Qualification or relegation
1	Flacăra Horezu (Q)	26	24	1	1	136	29	+107	73	Qualification to championship play-off
2	Posada Perișani (Q)	26	24	0	2	118	28	+90	72	Qualification to championship play-off
3	Cozia Călimănești	26	20	4	2	85	23	+62	64	
4	Viitorul Dăești	26	14	2	10	56	49	+7	44	
5	Hidroelectra Râmnicu Vâlcea	26	13	3	10	67	54	+13	42	
6	Foresta Malaia	26	10	4	12	52	64	−12	34	
7	Topologul Galicea	26	8	7	11	39	59	−20	31	
8	Minerul Ocnele Mari	26	9	4	13	48	65	−17	31	
9	Stejarul Vlădești	26	8	3	15	44	69	−25	27	
10	Lotru Brezoi	26	8	3	15	39	75	−36	27	
11	Viitorul Budești	26	8	3	15	49	86	−37	27	
12	Căzănești Râmnicu Vâlcea	26	7	4	15	47	64	−17	25	
13	Unirea Păușești-Măglași	26	5	4	17	38	89	−51	19	
14	Progresul Măldărești	26	3	0	23	24	88	−64	9 (Note: Progresul Măldărești withdrew in the second part of the season and lost all remaining matches with 0–3.)	

Rules for classification: 1) Points; 2) Head-to-head points; 3) Head-to-head goal difference; 4) Head-to-head goals scored; 5) Head-to-head away goals scored; 6) Goal difference; 7) Goals scored.
(Q) Qualified for the phase indicated

==== South Series ====
Pos	Team	Pld	W	D	L	GF	GA	GD	Pts	Qualification or relegation
1	Băbeni (Q)	28	24	3	1	131	20	+111	75	Qualification to championship play-off
2	Șirineasa (Q)	28	23	2	3	116	15	+101	71	Qualification to championship play-off
3	Unirea Drăgășani	28	22	2	4	82	15	+67	68	
4	Experți Popești	28	17	4	7	96	55	+41	55	
5	Mădulari	28	13	7	8	50	37	+13	46	
6	Unirea Tomșani	28	13	3	12	66	81	−15	42	
7	Crețeni	28	13	2	13	61	59	+2	41	
8	Oltețul Alunu	28	13	2	13	51	58	−7	41	
9	Voința Orlești	28	10	5	13	49	80	−31	35	
10	Râmnicu Vâlcea II	28	10	4	14	65	62	+3	34	
11	Victoria Frâncești	28	10	0	18	59	91	−32	30	
12	Viitorul Valea Mare	28	8	4	16	53	74	−21	28	
13	Oltul Ionești	28	7	1	20	41	116	−75	22	
14	Zorile Scundu	28	6	1	21	41	110	−69	19	
15	Șușani	28	0	2	26	17	105	−88	2 (Note: Șușani withdrew in the second part of the season and lost all remaining matches with 0–3.)	

Rules for classification: 1) Points; 2) Head-to-head points; 3) Head-to-head goal difference; 4) Head-to-head goals scored; 5) Head-to-head away goals scored; 6) Goal difference; 7) Goals scored.
(Q) Qualified for the phase indicated

==== Championship play-off ====
===== Semi-finals =====
Team 1	Agg.	Team 2	1st leg	2nd leg
Posada Perișani	4–3	Băbeni	1–1	3–2
Șirineasa	3–5	Flacăra Horezu	2–2	1–3

===== Final =====
Team 1	Score	Team 2
Flacăra Horezu	2–1	Posada Perișani

Flacăra Horezu won the 2013–14 Liga IV Vâlcea County and qualify to promotion play-off in Liga III.

=== Vrancea County ===
Pos	Team	Pld	W	D	L	GF	GA	GD	Pts	Qualification or relegation
1	Selena Jariștea (C, Q)	22	20	0	2	107	18	+89	60	Qualification to promotion play-off
2	Young Stars Panciu	22	15	4	3	55	21	+34	49	
3	Euromania Dumbrăveni	22	14	3	5	53	30	+23	45	
4	Voința Odobești	22	11	4	7	55	47	+8	37	
5	Voința Cârligele	22	9	3	10	52	63	−11	30	
6	Energia Vulturu	22	7	5	10	48	53	−5	26	
7	Victoria Gugești	22	7	5	10	42	49	−7	26	
8	Victoria Gologanu	22	7	3	12	34	49	−15	24	
9	Suraia	22	5	8	9	45	50	−5	23	
10	Unirea Țifești (O)	22	6	4	12	48	64	−16	22	Qualification to relegation play-off
11	Mărășești (R)	22	6	3	13	35	76	−41	21	Relegation to Liga V Vrancea
12	Câmpineanca (R)	22	2	4	16	26	80	−54	10	Relegation to Liga V Vrancea

Rules for classification: 1) Points; 2) Head-to-head points; 3) Head-to-head goal difference; 4) Head-to-head goals scored; 5) Head-to-head away goals scored; 6) Goal difference; 7) Goals scored.
(C) Champions; (O) Play-off winners; (Q) Qualified for the phase indicated; (R) Relegated

==== Relegation play-off ====
The 10th-placed team of the Liga IV faces the 3rd placed team from Liga V Vrancea County.

Team 1	Agg.	Team 2	1st leg	2nd leg
Voința Răstoaca	3–5	Unirea Țifești	2–3	1–2

== See also ==
- 2013–14 Liga I
- 2013–14 Liga II
- 2013–14 Liga III
