= CS Lotus Băile Felix =

Romanian football club

Lotus Băile Felix
- Full name: Club Sportiv Lotus Băile Felix
- Nicknames: Echipa din Felix (The Team from Felix)
- Short name: Lotus
- Founded: 1970; 56 years ago as Lotus Băile Felix; 16 June 2009; 17 years ago as CSC Sânmartin
- Ground: Comunal
- Capacity: 1,000 (261 seated)
- Owner: Sânmartin Commune
- Chairman: Alexa Krenek
- Manager: Cosmin Bodea
- League: Liga III
- 2025–26: Liga III, Seria VIII, 6th
Home colours	Away colours

Club Sportiv Lotus Băile Felix, commonly known as Lotus Băile Felix, or simply as Lotus, is a Romanian football club based in Băile Felix, Sânmartin, Bihor County, currently playing in the Liga III.

Lotus Băile Felix originally founded in the 1970s (Metalul Baile Felix) and was disbanded in the 2000s, after some merger processes with Luceafărul Oradea and Știința Bacău. The club was re-founded on 16 June 2009 under the name of CSC Sânmartin and played for most of its existence at the amateur level, in the Liga IV. Promoted in 2014 in the third tier, the club resisted only one season before withdrawing due to financial difficulties. In 2019, with the financial support of the Commune of Sânmartin, the biggest and one of the richest communes in Bihor County, fact owed to the presence of thermal waters in the area, CSC managed to won Liga IV, Bihor County series and also the promotion play-off, promoting back to Liga III.

In the summer of 2021, the club went through a process of re-branding, changing its name from CSC Sânmartin to CS Lotus Băile Felix, bringing in the front the name of Băile Felix, a Romanian well known thermal spa resort that is under Sânmartin Commune administration.

== History ==
Lotus Băile Felix was originally founded in the early 1970s and never exceed the level of the fourth tier until the 2005–06 season. In the summer of 2006, Lotus Băile Felix merged with a youth club Luceafărul Oradea and formed Luceafărul-Lotus Băile Felix, club that was active for 2 years, then was absorbed in Știința Bacău. On 16 June 2009 the club was re-established, now under the name of CSC Sânmartin and until 2014 played only at the amateur level. At the end of the 2013–14 season, CSC managed to won Liga IV, Bihor County series, as well as the promotion play-off against Sportul Șimleu Silvaniei and was promoted for the first time in its history in the Liga III. After only one season, the club withdrew due to financial difficulties and played again at amateur level until it managed to promote at the end of the 2018–19 campaign, this time financially supported by the Commune of Sânmartin. Under the command of Călin Cheregi, former manager of FC Bihor Oradea, sânmartinenii won Bihor County series after a tough battle against Club Atletic Oradea, then winning the promotion play-off with 4–0 on aggregate, against Cluj County champions, CS Florești.

In the summer of 2021, the club went through a process of re-branding, changing its name from CSC Sânmartin to CS Lotus Băile Felix, bringing in the front the name of Băile Felix, a Romanian well known thermal spa resort that is under Sânmartin Commune administration.

== Grounds ==
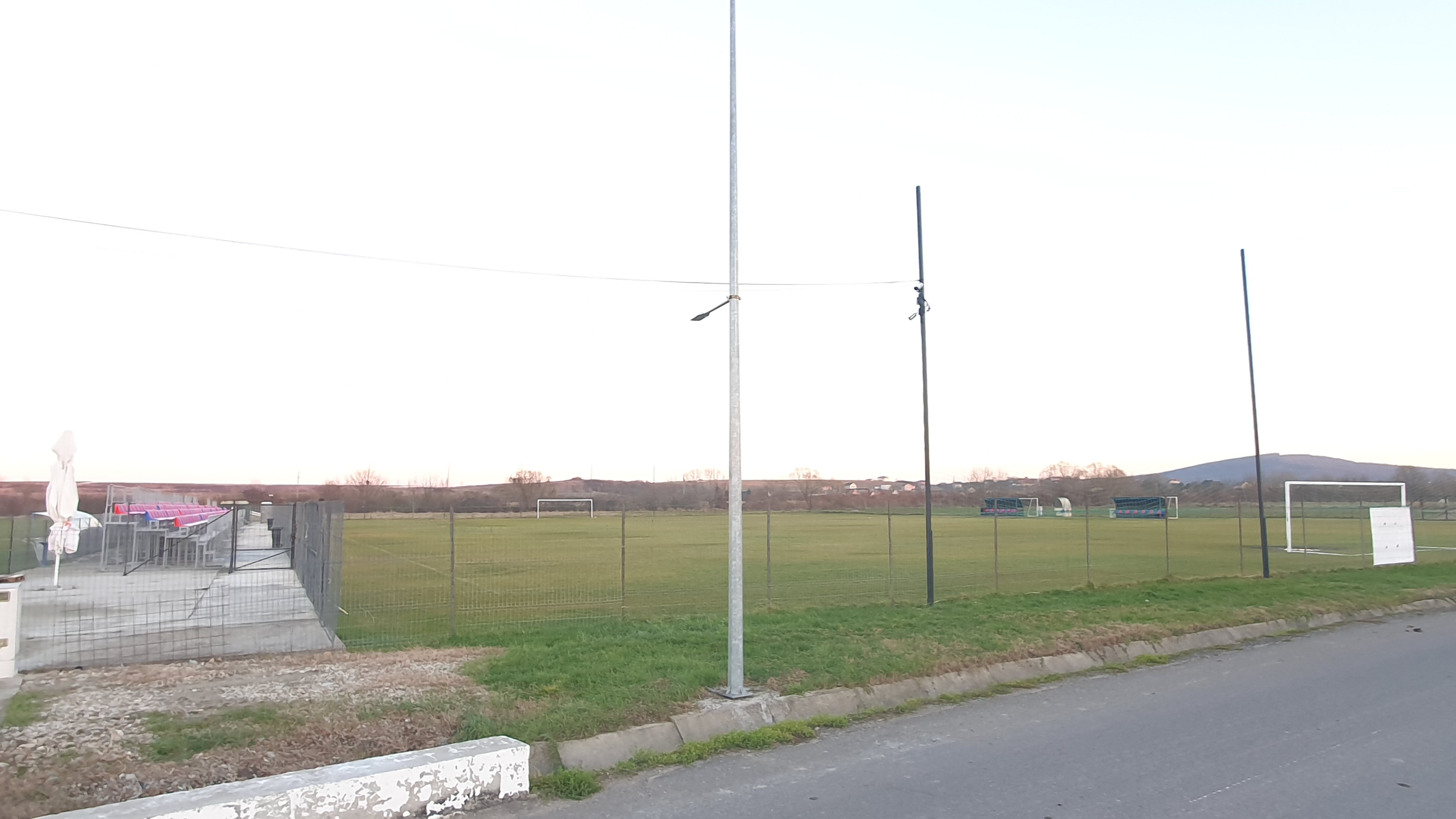
Comunal Stadium, current home ground of the club.

Over its relatively short history, Lotus Băile Felix played its home matches on various grounds such as Luceafărul Stadium, Cordău Stadium or Sântion Stadium. In 2018 the club started to build its own ground near the stadium of the local rival, Luceafărul Oradea. In the summer of 2020, Comunal Stadium was opened, with a capacity of 261.

== Honours ==
- Liga IV – Bihor County
  - Winners (3): 2013–14, 2017–18, 2018–19
- Cupa României – Bihor County
  - Winners (1): 2018–19

== Players ==
=== First team squad ===
As of 18 January 2026

Note: Flags indicate national team as defined under FIFA eligibility rules; some limited exceptions apply. Players may hold more than one non-FIFA nationality.

No.	Pos.	Nation	Player
1	GK	ROU	Paul Cosma
3	MF	FRA	Yaya Diaby
4	DF	ROU	Tamás Páublusztig
5	DF	ROU	Marian Arsene (Captain)
6	DF	ROU	Denis Sala
7	DF	ROU	Steliano Filip
8	MF	ROU	George Cherman
9	FW	ROU	Raul Tămaș
10	MF	ROU	David Ciurcui
11	MF	ROU	Ianis Bere
12	GK	ROU	Eduard Beke
14	FW	ROU	Andrei Cherman (on loan from FC Bihor)
15	MF	ROU	Patrick Rogojan

No.	Pos.	Nation	Player
16	DF	ROU	Alex Nagy
17	MF	ROU	Patrick Blăgea
18	MF	ROU	Constantin Trip (on loan from CSM Olimpia)
19	FW	ROU	Daniel Duma
20	MF	ROU	Tiberiu Serediuc
21	DF	ROU	Loren Ioviță
23	DF	ROU	Daniel Stan
24	DF	ROU	Alexandru Pintea
25	DF	ROU	Cătălin Chencian
26	MF	GER	Travis Kpegouni
28	MF	ROU	Darius Gheban
32	MF	ROU	George Avram

=== Out on loan ===
Note: Flags indicate national team as defined under FIFA eligibility rules; some limited exceptions apply. Players may hold more than one non-FIFA nationality.

No. / Pos. / Nation / Player	No. / Pos. / Nation / Player

== Club Officials ==
=== Board of directors ===
Role	Name
Owner	(Romania) Sânmartin Commune
President	(Romania) Alexa Krenek
Sporting Director	(Romania) Ovidiu Popa
Team Manager	(Romania) Ciprian Fiter

=== Current technical staff ===
Role	Name
Manager	(Romania) Cosmin Bodea
Assistant coach	(Romania) Ovidiu Morna
Goalkeeping coach	(Romania) Nicolae Petre
Club doctor	(Romania) Șerban Daina
Kinetotherapist	(Romania) Desideriu Szilágyi

== Notable former players ==
The footballers enlisted below have had international cap(s) for their respective countries at junior and/or senior level and/or more than 50 caps for CS Lotus Băile Felix.

- (Burkina Faso) Salif Nogo
- (Romania) Cristian Oroș
- (Romania) Alexandru Sorian

== Former managers ==
- (Romania) Ciprian Dianu (2011)
- (Romania) Ion Dumitra (2012–2013)
- (Romania) Daniel Lupașcu (2015–2017)
- (Romania) Cosmin Bodea (2019)
- (Romania) Cosmin Bodea (2023)

== League history ==
Season	Tier	Division	Place	Cupa României
2025–26	3	Liga III (Seria VIII)	TBD	
2024–25	3	Liga III (Seria IX)	6th	
2023–24	3	Liga III (Seria X)	6th	
2022–23	3	Liga III (Seria X)	4th	
2021–22	3	Liga III (Seria X)	3rd	
2020–21	3	Liga III (Seria X)	5th	Round of 32

Season	Tier	Division	Place	Cupa României
2019–20	3	Liga III (Seria V)	6th	
2018–19	4	Liga IV (BH)	1st (C, P)	
2017–18	4	Liga IV (BH)	1st (C)	
2016–17	4	Liga IV (BH)	12th	
2014–15	3	Liga III (Seria V)	6th (R)	
2013–14	4	Liga IV (BH)	1st (C, P)	
