= Sântandrei =

- Commune
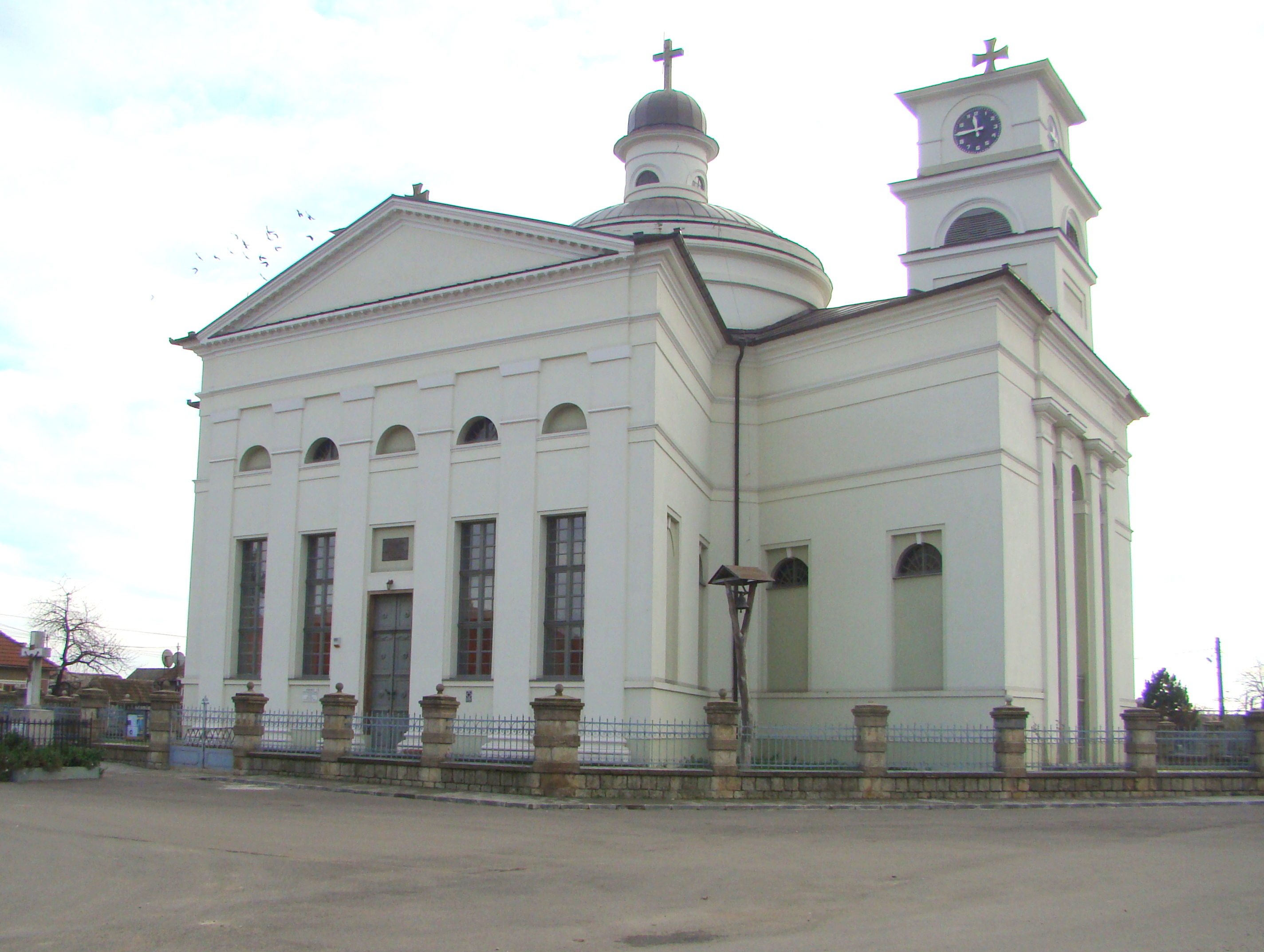
- Catholic church in Palota

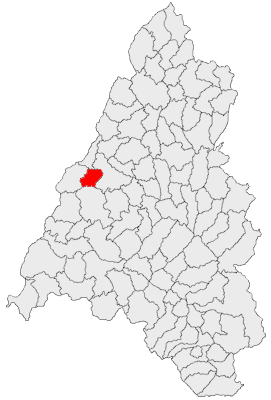
- Location in Bihor County

- Location in Romania
- Coordinates: 47°04′N 21°51′E
- Country: Romania
- County: Bihor

Government
  - Mayor (2020–2024): Ioan Mărcuș (PNL)
- Area: 29.5 km^{2} (11.4 sq mi)
- Elevation: 112 m (367 ft)
- Population (2021-12-01): 9,025
  - Density: 306/km^{2} (792/sq mi)
- Time zone: UTC+02:00 (EET)
  - Summer (DST): UTC+03:00 (EEST)
- Postal code: 417515
- Area code: +(40) 259
- Vehicle reg.: BH
- Website: www.primariasantandrei.ro

Sântandrei (Hungarian: Biharszentandrás) is a commune in Bihor County, Crișana, Romania. It is composed of two villages, Palota (Újpalota) and Sântandrei.
