= 2005–06 FC Bihor Oradea (1958) season =

Bihor Oradea
2005–06 season
- Owner: Oradea Municipality; Bihor County Council
- Chairman: Sorin Husăsan (pre-season); Marcel Iancu (1–6); Sándor Lajos (7–9); Alexandru Sătmăreanu (10–30)
- Manager: Alin Artimon (1–7); Marin Ion (8–15); Alexandru Kiss (9–30)
- Stadium: Municipal
- Divizia B: 2nd
- Cupa României: Round of 32
- Top goalscorer: League: Valentin Miculescu (8); All: Valentin Miculescu (8)
- Highest home attendance: 3,000 vs Unirea Alba Iulia (27 August 2005); 3,000 vs FCM Reșița (10 May 2006)
- Lowest home attendance: 500 vs Corvinul 2005 (12 April 2006)
- Average home league attendance: 1,686
Home colours	Away colours	Third colours

The 2005–06 season was Bihor Oradea's 47th season in the Romanian football league system, and their 27th season in the Divizia B. At the end of the season the team finished on 2nd place and qualified for the Divizia A promotion play-off that was held on Lia Manoliu Stadium from Bucharest. FC Bihor played against the 2nd places from the other series, Forex Brașov and Unirea Urziceni, but failed to promote. FC Bihor's 47th seasons was another agitated one, with a lot of changes in the managerial and technical staff, also for promotion was a tough fight against another team from Bihor County, Liberty Salonta, which finished 1st. FC Bihor lost the play-off and Liberty sold its first division place to UTA Arad, so from 2 potential teams in the first league, the county remained with none.

== First team squad ==
Note: Flags indicate national team as defined under FIFA eligibility rules; some limited exceptions apply. Players may hold more than one non-FIFA nationality.

No.	Pos.	Nation	Player
—	GK	ROU	Filip Lăzăreanu
—	GK	SCG	Mario Mizailuk
—	GK	ROU	Adrian Mihai
—	GK	ROU	Cosmin Vâtcă
—	DF	ROU	Sebastian Achim
—	DF	ROU	Adrian Balea
—	DF	ROU	Dionisiu Bumb
—	DF	ROU	Codruț Ciobanu
—	DF	ROU	Bogdan Cistean
—	DF	ROU	Adrian Gongolea
—	DF	ROU	Florin Lazăr
—	DF	ROU	Mihai Lungan
—	DF	ROU	Cristian Lupuț (Captain)
—	DF	ROU	Dorin Mihuț
—	DF	ROU	Cristian Munteanu
—	DF	ROU	Dumitru Muscă
—	DF	ROU	Cristian Oroş
—	DF	ROU	Florin Pătrașcu
—	DF	ROU	Alin Șeroni

No.	Pos.	Nation	Player
—	MF	ROU	Sorin Bugiu
—	MF	ROU	Sándor Fele
—	MF	ROU	Marius Foro
—	MF	ROU	Ramses Gado
—	MF	ROU	Valentin Grigore
—	MF	ROU	Claudiu Mutu
—	MF	ROU	Constantin Oprea
—	MF	ROU	Florin Sabou
—	MF	ROU	Sebastian Sfârlea
—	MF	SCG	Andraš Strapak
—	MF	ROU	Tibor Szeles
—	MF	ROU	Octavian Trăistaru
—	MF	ROU	Grigorie Tudor
—	FW	ROU	Raymond Lukács
—	FW	ROU	Daniel Lupașcu
—	FW	ROU	Valentin Miculescu
—	FW	ROU	Florin Neaga
—	FW	ROU	Daniel Stan
—	FW	ROU	Adrian Voiculeț

== Pre-season and friendlies ==
17 July 2005	Létavértes (Hungary)	0–1	(Romania) Bihor Oradea	Tiszaújváros, Hungary
11:00 UTC+2		Report	Munteanu	Stadium: Sport Park

23 July 2005	Debrecen (Hungary)	1–0	(Romania) Bihor Oradea	Debrecen, Romania
20:00 UTC+2	Brnović 74'	Report		Stadium: Oláh Gábor II

26 July 2005	Bihor Oradea (Romania)	5–1	(Romania) Lotus Băile Felix	Oradea, Romania
18:00 UTC+3	Sfârlea 12' (pen.), 45'; Fele 22'; Balea 74'; Sabău 82'	Report	Szeles 65'	Stadium: Municipal; Attendance: 500; Referee: Laurenţiu Danşa (Oradea)

29 July 2005	Bihorul Beiuș (Romania)	1–2	(Romania) Bihor Oradea	Beiuș, Romania
17:00 UTC+3	Bodean 13'	Report	Lukács 2', 20'	Stadium: Bihorul; Attendance: 150; Referee: Vasile Sin (Ștei)

30 July 2005	Bihor Oradea (Romania)	3–0	(Romania) Gloria Bistrița	Oradea, Romania
10:00 UTC+3	Sfârlea 7' (pen.); Lupașcu 61'; Lungan 89'	Report		Stadium: Municipal; Attendance: 150; Referee: Ciprian Danşa (Oradea)

3 August 2005	Bihor Oradea (Romania)	0–1	(Romania) Olimpia Satu Mare	Oradea, Romania
18:00 UTC+3		Report	Rus 3' (pen.)	Stadium: Municipal; Attendance: 150; Referee: Laurenţiu Danşa (Oradea)

8 August 2005	FC U Craiova (Romania)	1–0	(Romania) Bihor Oradea	Craiova, Romania
20:30 UTC+3	Mitchell 54'	Report		Stadium: Ion Oblemenco

10 August 2005	Bihor Oradea (Romania)	5–0	(Romania) Armătura Zalău	Oradea, Romania
11:00 UTC+3	Stan 26'; Lupașcu 27', 90'; Tudor 71', 84'	Report		Stadium: Municipal; Attendance: 150; Referee: Florin Marcu (Oradea)

13 August 2005	Armătura Zalău (Romania)	1–2	(Romania) Bihor Oradea	Zalău, Romania
11:00 UTC+3	Țîrlea 29'	Report	Miculescu 83', 84'	Stadium: Municipal

25 January 2006	Sportul Studențesc (Romania)	3–2	(Romania) Bihor Oradea	Sinaia, Romania
11:00 UTC+2	Mazilu; Varga; Curelea	Report	Strapak; Fele	Stadium: Carpați

27 January 2006	Astra Ploiești (Romania)	0–1	(Romania) Bihor Oradea	Sinaia, Romania
14:00 UTC+2		Report	Lupuț 2'	Stadium: Carpați

29 January 2006	Tractorul Brașov (Romania)	0–1	(Romania) Bihor Oradea	Sinaia, Romania
11:00 UTC+2		Report	Achim	Stadium: Carpați

1 February 2006	Petrolul Ploiești (Romania)	2–2	(Romania) Bihor Oradea	Ploiești, Romania
11:00 UTC+2	Marinescu 45'; Buglea 90'	Report	Voiculeț 75'; Lungan 80'	Stadium: Ilie Oană

4 February 2006	Brașov (Romania)	1–1	(Romania) Bihor Oradea	Brașov, Romania
11:00 UTC+2	Goal	Report	Lupaşcu 65'	Stadium: Silviu Ploeșteanu

10 February 2006	Karcag (Hungary)	0–4	(Romania) Bihor Oradea	Tiszaújváros, Hungary
13:00 UTC+1		Report	Tempfli; Voiculeț; Miculescu; Tudor	Stadium: Sport Park

11 February 2006	REAC (Hungary)	0–3	(Romania) Bihor Oradea	Tiszaújváros, Hungary
13:00 UTC+1		Report	Achim 22'; Miculescu 30'; V.Grigore 35'	Stadium: Sport Park

11 February 2006	Jászapáti (Hungary)	1–1	(Romania) Bihor Oradea	Tiszaújváros, Hungary
14:00 UTC+1	Goal	Report	Szeles 30'	Stadium: Sport Park

14 February 2006	Nyíregyháza Spartacus (Hungary)	3–1	(Romania) Bihor Oradea	Nyíregyháza, Hungary
13:00 UTC+1	Goal	Report	Miculescu 48' (pen.)	Stadium: Városi II

15 February 2006	Debrecen II (Hungary)	0–1	(Romania) Bihor Oradea	Debrecen, Hungary
13:00 UTC+1		Report	V.Grigore 32'	Stadium: Oláh Gábor II

18 February 2006	Százhalombatta (Hungary)	0–0	(Romania) Bihor Oradea	Tiszaújváros, Hungary
13:00 UTC+1		Report		Stadium: Sport Park

18 February 2006	Diósgyőr (Hungary)	0–0	(Romania) Bihor Oradea	Tiszaújváros, Hungary
14:00 UTC+1		Report		Stadium: Sport Park

25 February 2006	Bihor Oradea (Romania)	0–0	(Romania) Politehnica Timișoara	Oradea, Romania
15:00 UTC+2		Report		Stadium: Municipal; Attendance: 5,000; Referee: Ciprian Danşa (Oradea)

4 March 2006	Bihor Oradea (Romania)	1–3	(Romania) Olimpia Satu Mare	Borș, Romania
11:00 UTC+2	Lukács 66'	Report	Șuteu 29'; Oroș 31' (o.g.); Rus 48'	Stadium: Comunal; Attendance: 100; Referee: Florin Marcu (Oradea)

13 May 2006	Bihor Oradea (Romania)	1–3	(Romania) Politehnica II Timișoara	Oradea, Romania
15:00 UTC+3	Achim 5'	Report	Axente 1'; Poparadu 60'; Străuț 74' (pen.)	Stadium: Municipal

== Competitions ==
=== Seria III ===
Pos	Team	Pld	W	D	L	GF	GA	GD	Pts	Qualification or relegation
1	Liberty Salonta (C, P)	28	17	7	4	37	16	+21	58	Promotion to Liga I
2	Bihor Oradea	28	17	4	7	53	27	+26	55	Qualification to Promotion play-off
3	Universitatea Cluj	28	15	9	4	44	16	+28	54	
4	Gaz Metan Mediaș	28	15	6	7	38	21	+17	51	
5	FCM Reșița	28	11	7	10	26	29	−3	40	
6	Corvinul 2005 Hunedoara	28	10	8	10	33	35	−2	38	
7	CFR Timișoara	28	10	6	12	33	40	−7	36	
8	Gloria Bistrița II (Note: Gloria Bistrița II withdrew at the end of the season.) (R)	28	10	6	12	25	34	−9	36	Relegation to Liga III
9	Industria Sărmei Câmpia Turzii	28	8	10	10	30	29	+1	34	
10	Minerul Lupeni	28	9	7	12	26	31	−5	34	Possible relegation to Liga III
11	Olimpia Satu Mare (R)	28	9	5	14	24	36	−12	32	Relegation to Liga III
12	Unirea Dej (Note: Unirea Dej was spared from relegation after Gloria Bistrița II withdrew.)	28	9	5	14	29	37	−8	32	Spared from relegation
13	Apulum Alba Iulia (Note: Apulum Alba Iulia was spared from relegation after newly promoted Oltchim Râmnicu Vâlcea refused the promotion.)	28	6	10	12	21	31	−10	28	Spared from relegation
14	UTA Arad (R)	28	6	9	13	25	35	−10	27	Relegation to Liga III
15	Unirea Sânnicolau Mare (R)	28	6	5	17	21	48	−27	23	Relegation to Liga III
16	Armătura Zalău (Note: Armătura Zalău was excluded in the first part of the season and all its results were cancelled.) (D)	0	0	0	0	0	0	0	0	Withdrew

Updated to match(es) played on 30 June 2006. Source: romaniansoccer.ro (in Romanian)
Rules for classification: 1) Points; 2) Head-to-head points; 3) Head-to-head goal difference; 4) Head-to-head goals scored; 5) Head-to-head away goals scored; 6) Goal difference; 7) Goals scored.
(C) Champions; (D) Disqualified; (P) Promoted; (R) Relegated

==== Result round by round ====
Round	1	2	3	4	5	6	7	8	9	10	11	12	13	14	15	16	17	18	19	20	21	22	23	24	25	26	27	28	29	30
Ground	A	H	A	H	A	H	A	H	A	A	H	A	H	A	H	H	A	H	A	H	A	H	A	H	H	A	H	A	H	A
Result	W	W	L	L	W	L	L	W	D	L	P	D	W	W	W	W	L	W	D	D	W	W	W	W	W	P	W	W	W	L
Position	1	1	4	4	4	6	7	6	6	6	9	9	7	5	5	4	4	3	3	4	4	4	3	2	1	2	2	1	1	2

Source: 2005–06 Divizia B
A = Away; H = Home; W = Win; D = Draw; L = Loss; P = Postponed

==== Results ====
20 August 2005 1	Gloria II Bistrița	0–4	Bihor Oradea	Beclean
11:00 UTC+3		Report	Miculescu 11'; Stan 31'; Neaga 71'; Ciobanu 74'	Stadium: Laminorul; Attendance: 200; Referee: Ionică Serea (Focșani)

27 August 2005 2	Bihor Oradea	3–0	Unirea Alba Iulia	Oradea
11:00 UTC+3	Tudor 8'; Munteanu 34'; Miculescu 50' (pen.)	Report		Stadium: Municipal; Attendance: 3,000; Referee: Orlando Trandu (Timișoara)

3 September 2005 3	Minerul Lupeni	1–0	Bihor Oradea	Lupeni
11:00 UTC+3	Niculescu 22'	Report		Stadium: Minerul; Attendance: 4,000; Referee: Lucian Dan (Aiud)

10 September 2005 4	Bihor Oradea	1–2	UTA Arad	Oradea
11:00 UTC+3	Miculescu 30' (pen.)	Report	Nădăban 43' (pen.); Sântejudean 51'	Stadium: Municipal; Attendance: 2,500; Referee: Gabriel Mocean (Câmpia Turzii)

17 September 2005 5	Corvinul 2005 Hunedoara	1–2	Bihor Oradea	Hunedoara
11:00 UTC+3	Pepenar 54'	Report	Miculescu 12', 71'	Stadium: Michael Klein; Attendance: 1,000; Referee: Tiberiu Lajos (Timișoara)

24 September 2005 6	Bihor Oradea	1–3	IS Câmpia Turzii	Oradea
11:00 UTC+3	Gado 89' (pen.)	Report	Dâmbean 40'; Voiculeț 57'; Ghiorma 84'	Stadium: Municipal; Attendance: 800; Referee: Ludovic Uihely (Timișoara)

1 October 2005 7	Liberty Salonta	1–0	Bihor Oradea	Salonta
11:00 UTC+3	E.Bucur 45+1'	Report		Stadium: Liberty; Attendance: 800; Referee: Victor Berbecaru (Rm. Vâlcea)

8 October 2005 8	Bihor Oradea	4–1	Gaz Metan Mediaș	Oradea
11:00 UTC+3	Stan 15', 42'; Gado 43', 76'	Report	Petre 8'	Stadium: Municipal; Attendance: 1,500; Referee: Sebastian Colţescu (Craiova)

15 October 2005 9	Olimpia Satu Mare	0–0	Bihor Oradea	Satu Mare
11:00 UTC+3		Report		Stadium: Olimpia; Attendance: 700; Referee: Ionică Serea (Focșani)

22 October 2005 10	FCM Reșița	1–0	Bihor Oradea	Reșița
11:00 UTC+3	Gideon 32'	Report		Stadium: Mircea Chivu; Attendance: 500; Referee: Victor Stănişteanu (Focșani)

29 October 2005 11	Bihor Oradea	Canceled	Armătura Zalău	Oradea
11:00 UTC+3				Stadium: Municipal

5 November 2005 12	Unirea Dej	1–1	Bihor Oradea	Dej
11:00 UTC+2	Deac 41'	Report	Tudor 21'	Stadium: Unirea

12 November 2005 13	Bihor Oradea	1–0	CFR Timișoara	Oradea
11:00 UTC+2	Lupuț 22'	Report		Stadium: Municipal; Attendance: 1,000

19 November 2005 14	Unirea Sânnicolau Mare	1–3	Bihor Oradea	Sânnicolau Mare
11:00 UTC+2	V.Grigore 26'	Report	Neaga 33'; Munteanu 78'; Sfârlea 80'	Stadium: Unirea

26 November 2005 15	Bihor Oradea	3–2	Universitatea Cluj	Oradea
11:00 UTC+2	Stan 28'; A.Mureșan 32' (o.g.); Miculescu 71'	Report	Aldea 30'; A.Mureșan 53'	Stadium: Municipal; Attendance: 1,500; Referee: Victor Berbecaru (Rm. Vâlcea)

11 March 2006 16	Bihor Oradea	3–0	Gloria II Bistrița	Oradea
11:00 UTC+2	V.Grigore 36'; Foro 39'; Voiculeț 72'	Report		Stadium: Municipal; Attendance: 1,000; Referee: Vasile Balaş (Reșița)

25 March 2006 17	Unirea Alba Iulia	2–1	Bihor Oradea	Alba Iulia
11:00 UTC+2	Scarlat 18' (pen.); Király 90+2'	Report	Muscă 25'	Stadium: Cetate; Attendance: 1,000; Referee: Valentin Igna (Timișoara)

1 April 2006 18	Bihor Oradea	3–1	Minerul Lupeni	Oradea
11:00 UTC+3	Lazăr 48'; Szeles 53'; V.Grigore 71'	Report	Mihovici 67'	Stadium: Municipal; Attendance: 800; Referee: Horia Abrudan (Zimbor)

8 April 2006 19	UTA Arad	0–0	Bihor Oradea	Arad
11:00 UTC+3		Report		Stadium: UTA; Attendance: 2,000; Referee: Tiberiu Lajos (Timișoara)

12 April 2006 20	Bihor Oradea	1–1	Corvinul 2005 Hunedoara	Oradea
11:00 UTC+3	Voiculeț 73'	Report	Mitrică 78' (pen.)	Stadium: Municipal; Attendance: 500; Referee: Codruţ Nicoară (Râșnov)

15 April 2006 21	IS Câmpia Turzii	2–3	Bihor Oradea	Câmpia Turzii
11:00 UTC+3	Dicher 46'; Fetița 64'	Report	Oroian 70' (o.g.); Strapak 81'; Foro 83'	Stadium: ISCT; Attendance: 300; Referee: Adrian Comănescu (Rm. Vâlcea)

22 April 2006 22	Bihor Oradea	2–1	Liberty Salonta	Oradea
11:00 UTC+3	Strapak 34'; Miculescu 70'	Report	Zoicaș 30'	Stadium: Municipal; Attendance: 2,500; Referee: Ionică Serea (Focșani)

29 April 2006 23	Gaz Metan Mediaș	1–2	Bihor Oradea	Mediaș
11:00 UTC+3	Lungan 41' (o.g.)	Report	Foro 12'; Oroş 62'	Stadium: Gaz Metan; Attendance: 700; Referee: Alexandru Tudor (Bucharest)

6 May 2006 24	Bihor Oradea	3–0	Olimpia Satu Mare	Oradea
11:00 UTC+3	Lupuț 20'; Muscă 38'; Voiculeț 76'	Report		Stadium: Municipal; Attendance: 1,500; Referee: Valentin Igna (Timișoara)

10 May 2006 25	Bihor Oradea	1–0	FCM Reșița	Oradea
11:00 UTC+3	Miculescu 84' (pen.)	Report		Stadium: Municipal; Attendance: 3,000; Referee: Ovidiu Haţegan (Arad)

13 May 2006 26	Armătura Zalău	Canceled	Bihor Oradea	Zalău
11:00 UTC+3				Stadium: Municipal

20 May 2006 27	Bihor Oradea	2–1	Unirea Dej	Oradea
11:00 UTC+3	Strapak 36'; Lupuț 90+2'	Report	Zelencz 81'	Stadium: Municipal; Attendance: 2,000; Referee: Lucian Dan (Aiud)

24 May 2006 28	CFR Timișoara	0–1	Bihor Oradea	Timișoara
11:00 UTC+3		Report	Foro 55'	Stadium: CFR; Attendance: 500; Referee: Sebastian Colţescu (Craiova)

27 May 2006 29	Bihor Oradea	6–1	Unirea Sânnicolau Mare	Oradea
11:00 UTC+3	Lungan 13'; Foro 19', 90'; Neaga 22'; Lupuț 45' (pen.); Voiculeț 59'	Report	Turcan 50'	Stadium: Municipal; Attendance: 2,000; Referee: Eduard Constantinescu (Craiova)

3 June 2006 30	Universitatea Cluj	3–2	Bihor Oradea	Cluj-Napoca
11:00 UTC+3	A.Mureșan 32' (pen.); Goga 34'; Jula 56'	Report	Voiculeț 62', 90'	Stadium: Ion Moina; Attendance: 2,000; Referee: Orlando Trandu (Timișoara)

=== Promotion play-off ===
In the following season, the Liga I was expanded from 16 teams to 18 teams, therefore the Romanian Football Federation decided that a promotion playoff group would be played at the end of the season, between the second placed teams from each series of the Liga II, in order to establish the fourth promoted team (in exchange to the two teams relegated from the Liga I). The winner of this group, Unirea Urziceni, promoted to the Liga I, along with the three winners of the series.

Pos	Team	Pld	W	D	L	GF	GA	GD	Pts	Promotion
1	Unirea Urziceni (O, P)	2	2	0	0	5	2	+3	6	Promotion to Liga I
2	Forex Brașov	2	1	0	1	2	1	+1	3	
3	Bihor Oradea	2	0	0	2	2	6	−4	0	

(O) Play-off winners; (P) Promoted

10 June 2006	Forex Brașov	2–0	Bihor Oradea	Lia Manoliu
18:00	Manea 44'; Coman 76'	Report		Attendance: 1,000; Referee: Alexandru Tudor (Bucharest)

14 June 2006	Unirea Urziceni	4–2	Bihor Oradea	Lia Manoliu
18:00	Constantin 10'; Gheorghe 23' (pen.); Zaharia 34'; Predescu 45'	Report	Neaga 19'; Foro 72'	Attendance: 2,000; Referee: Sorin Corpodean (Alba Iulia)

17 June 2006	Forex Brașov	0–1	Unirea Urziceni	Lia Manoliu
18:00		Report	Predescu 21'	Attendance: 4,000; Referee: Alexandru Deaconu (Bucharest)

10 June 2006 Promotion play-off	Forex Brașov	2–0	Bihor Oradea	Bucharest
18:00 UTC+3	Fl.Manea 45'; Coman 77'	Report		Stadium: Lia Manoliu; Attendance: 1,000; Referee: Alexandru Tudor (Bucharest)

14 June 2006 Promotion play-off	Unirea Urziceni	4–2	Bihor Oradea	Bucharest
18:00 UTC+3	Constantin 10'; Gheorghe 23' (pen.); Zaharia 34'; Predescu 45'	Report	Neaga 19'; Foro 72'	Stadium: Lia Manoliu; Attendance: 2,000; Referee: Sorin Corpodean (Alba Iulia)

=== Cupa României ===
30 August 2005 Fourth Round	UTA Arad	0–1	Bihor Oradea	Arad
17:00 UTC+3		Report	Lupașcu 44'	Stadium: UTA; Attendance: 500; Referee: Viorel Sandu (Bucharest)

7 September 2005 Fifth Round	Liberty Salonta	0–3	Bihor Oradea	Salonta
16:00 UTC+3		Report	Sabou 30'; Lupașcu 80'; Oprea 82'	Stadium: Liberty; Attendance: 800; Referee: Orlando Trandu (Timișoara)

21 September 2005 Round of 32	Bihor Oradea	0–2	Jiul Petroșani	Oradea
15:00 UTC+3		Report	Movilă 22', 88'	Stadium: Municipal; Attendance: 2,000; Referee: Orlando Trandu (Timișoara)

== See also ==
- 2005–06 Cupa României
- Divizia B
