= 2003–04 FC Bihor Oradea (1958) season =

FC Oradea
2003–04 season
- Owner: Marius Vizer; Oradea Municipality; Bihor County Council
- Chairman: Ioan Lucian (1–15); Gavrilă Ghilea (16–19); Petru Hotea (20–30)
- Manager: Ionuț Popa (1–15); Dumitru Dumitriu (16–20); Zsolt Muzsnay (21–30)
- Stadium: Municipal
- Divizia A: 16th (relegated)
- Cupa României: Round of 16
- Top goalscorer: League: Bogdan Vrăjitoarea (14); All: Bogdan Vrăjitoarea (14)
- Highest home attendance: 15,000 vs Rapid București (10 August 2003)
- Lowest home attendance: 1,500 vs Brașov (3 June 2004)
- Average home league attendance: 8,333
Home colours	Away colours

The 2003–04 season was Bihor Oradea's 45th season in the Romanian football league system, and their 18th season in the Divizia A. At the end of the season the team finished on 16th place and relegated back to Divizia B, after only one season in the top flight of the Romanian football. During this season the club was known as FC Oradea.

== First team squad ==
Note: Flags indicate national team as defined under FIFA eligibility rules; some limited exceptions apply. Players may hold more than one non-FIFA nationality.

No.	Pos.	Nation	Player
1	GK	ROU	Gabriel Rotaru (Vice-Captain)
2	DF	ROU	Nicolae Stanciu
3	DF	ROU	Alin Zaha
4	DF	ROU	Ciprian Dianu (Vice-Captain)
5	DF	ROU	Aurel Amzucu
6	MF	ROU	Mihai Lungan
7	DF	ROU	Dorin Mihuț
8	MF	ROU	Ion Dumitra (Captain)
9	FW	ROU	Daniel Lupașcu
9	FW	ROU	Daniel Stan
10	MF	ROU	Leonard Naidin (Vice-Captain)
10	FW	MKD	Jurica Siljanoski
11	MF	ROU	Ramses Gado
12	GK	SCG	Dušan Brojcin
12	GK	ROU	Marius Mârne
13	MF	ROU	Vasile Georgiu

No.	Pos.	Nation	Player
14	DF	ROU	Cristian Munteanu
15	MF	ROU	Sebastian Sfârlea
16	MF	ROU	Radu Mărginean
17	DF	SCG	Aleksandar Stefanović
18	MF	ROU	Sándor Fele
19	DF	ROU	Florin Lazăr
20	MF	ROU	Alin Coțan
20	FW	BIH	Aleksandar Obrenović
21	MF	ROU	Răzvan Frițea
22	GK	ROU	Cosmin Vâtcă
23	FW	ROU	Bogdan Vrăjitoarea (Vice-Captain)
24	FW	ROU	Claudiu Keșerü
25	FW	ROU	Cristian Cigan
25	MF	ROU	Mihai Nicolae
25	FW	ROU	Marius Siminic

== Pre-season and friendlies ==
13 July 2003	FC Oradea (Romania)	6–2	(Romania) Minerul Ștei	Oradea, Romania
17:30 UTC+3	Goal	Report	Goal	Stadium: Motorul

15 July 2003	Diósgyőr (Hungary)	–	(Romania) FC Oradea	Miskolc, Hungary
18:00 UTC+3				Stadium: Diósgyőr

16 July 2003	FC Oradea (Romania)	3–3	(Romania) Tricotaje Ineu	Oradea, Romania
11:00 UTC+3	Dianu 38'; Sfârlea 85'; Keșerü 90'	Report	Luca 18'; Balaci 30'; Pantea 78' (pen.)	Stadium: Motorul; Attendance: 300; Referee: Ionel Danciar (Oradea)

16 July 2003	FC Oradea (Romania)	–	(Romania) Poli AEK Timișoara	Oradea, Romania
18:00 UTC+3				Stadium: Motorul

19 July 2003	FC Oradea (Romania)	1–1	(Hungary) Debrecen	Oradea, Romania
18:00 UTC+3	Sfârlea 38'	Report	Selymes 21' (pen.)	Stadium: Municipal; Attendance: 4,000; Referee: Florin Marcu (Oradea)

23 July 2003	CFR Cluj (Romania)	–	(Romania) FC Oradea	Cluj-Napoca, Romania
18:00 UTC+3				Stadium: CFR

28 July 2003	FC Oradea (Romania)	3–0	(Romania) Lotus Băile Felix	Oradea, Romania
11:00 UTC+3	Lungan 13'; Stan 29', 35'	Report		Stadium: Municipal; Attendance: 200

28 July 2003	FC Oradea (Romania)	3–2	(Egypt) Haras El Hodoud	Oradea, Romania
18:15 UTC+3	Goal	Report	Goal	Stadium: Municipal

30 July 2003	FC Oradea (Romania)	2–0	(Romania) Tricotaje Ineu	Oradea, Romania
16:00 UTC+3	Dumitra 50'; Mărginean 85'	Report		Stadium: Municipal

1 August 2003	FC Oradea (Romania)	–	(Romania) Gloria Bistrița	Oradea, Romania
16:00 UTC+3				Stadium: Motorul

2 August 2003	FC Oradea (Romania)	2–3	(Romania) ACU Arad	Oradea, Romania
11:00 UTC+3	Sfârlea 35'; Mărginean 85'	Report	Aslău 26'; Bâgu 72'; Solomon 78'	Stadium: Motorul; Attendance: 150; Referee: Ștefan Erdei (Oradea)

7 August 2003	FC Oradea (Romania)	6–0	(Romania) Bihorul Beiuș	Oradea, Romania
17:00 UTC+3	Sfârlea 7'; Gado 16'; Vrăjitoarea 18'; Naidin 56' (pen.); Stan 72'; Keșerü 79'	Report		Stadium: Municipal

3 February 2004	FC Oradea (Romania)	2–1	Albania B	Norcia, Italy
15:30 UTC+2	Vrăjitoarea 40' (pen.), 65'	Report	Goal	Stadium: Salicone

5 February 2004	FCU Craiova (Romania)	2–0	(Romania) FC Oradea	Trevi, Italy
15:30 UTC+2	Prunecchi 37'; Pleșan 78'	Report		Stadium: Alberto Pinca

7 February 2004	Argeș Pitești (Romania)	1–2	(Romania) FC Oradea	Trevi, Italy
15:30 UTC+2	Antal 64'	Report	Vrăjitoarea 25'; Gado 37'	Stadium: Alberto Pinca

10 February 2004	Pyunik (Armenia)	1–3	(Romania) FC Oradea	Norcia, Italy
15:30 UTC+2	Goal	Report	Gado pen.' Lupașcu	Stadium: Salicone

29 January 2004	FC Oradea (Romania)	3–1	(Romania) Mobila Șimleu Silvaniei	Oradea, Romania
11:00 UTC+2	Amzucu 19'; Stan 22'; Nicolae 51'	Report	Ispas 86'	Stadium: Municipal; Attendance: 400; Referee: Florin Marcu (Oradea)

21 February 2004	FC Oradea (Romania)	2–1	(Romania) UTA Arad	Oradea, Romania
11:00 UTC+2	Sfârlea 25'; Lupașcu 75'	Report	Ștefăligă 85'	Stadium: Municipal; Attendance: 4,000; Referee: Ștefan Erdei (Oradea)

25 February 2004	Poli AEK Timișoara (Romania)	1–0	(Romania) FC Oradea	Timișoara, Romania
15:30 UTC+2	C.Prodan 76'	Report		Stadium: Știința

1 March 2004	FC Oradea (Romania)	1–2	(Romania) UTA Arad	Inand, Romania
11:00 UTC+2	Mărginean 76'	Report	M.Popescu 49'; D.Rădoi 61'	Stadium: Voința; Attendance: 300; Referee: Călin Cheregi (Oradea)

3 March 2004	Regiana Cefa (Romania)	0–3	(Romania) FC Oradea	Inand, Romania
14:00 UTC+2		Report	Stan 70', 80'; Frițea 77'	Stadium: Voința; Referee: Cosmin Vâtcă (Turda)

8 March 2004	UTA Arad (Romania)	1–1	(Romania) FC Oradea	Arad, Romania
11:00 UTC+2	Luca 66'	Report	Siljanoski 57'	Stadium: Francisc von Neuman; Attendance: 1,500; Referee: Ovidiu Hațegan (Arad)

28 April 2004	FC Oradea (Romania)	5–2	(Romania) Crișul Aleșd	Oradea, Romania
17:00 UTC+3	Vrăjitoarea 4' (pen.); Siljanoski 38', 53', 76'; Gado 48'	Report	Cura 55' (o.g.); Popa 80' (pen.)	Stadium: Municipal

== Competitions ==
=== Divizia A ===
Pos	Team	Pld	W	D	L	GF	GA	GD	Pts	Qualification or relegation
12	Gloria Bistrița	30	9	8	13	36	48	−12	35	Qualification to Intertoto Cup first round
13	FCM Bacău	30	7	10	13	29	43	−14	31	
14	Ceahlăul Piatra Neamț (R)	30	7	9	14	34	50	−16	30	Relegation to Divizia B
15	Petrolul Ploiești (R)	30	6	9	15	38	55	−17	27	Relegation to Divizia B
16	FC Oradea (R)	30	6	6	18	38	50	−12	24	Relegation to Divizia B

Source: LT (in Romanian)
Rules for classification: 1) points; 2) head-to-head points; 3) head-to-head goal difference; 4) head-to-head goals scored; 5) goal difference; 6) number of goals scored.
(R) Relegated

==== Result round by round ====
Round	1	2	3	4	5	6	7	8	9	10	11	12	13	14	15	16	17	18	19	20	21	22	23	24	25	26	27	28	29	30
Ground	H	A	H	A	H	A	H	A	A	H	A	H	A	H	A	A	H	A	H	A	H	A	H	H	A	H	A	H	A	H
Result	D	L	D	L	L	W	W	L	L	D	L	W	L	W	L	L	L	D	L	L	W	L	L	L	W	D	L	L	L	D
Position	7	13	15	16	16	14	10	12	14	16	16	15	16	11	14	15	16	16	16	16	15	16	16	16	16	16	16	16	16	16

Source: 2003–04 Divizia A
A = Away; H = Home; W = Win; D = Draw; L = Loss

==== Results ====
10 August 2003 1	FC Oradea	1–1	Rapid București	Oradea
16:00 UTC+3	Vrăjitoarea 3'	Report	Niță 81'	Stadium: Municipal; Attendance: 15,000; Referee: Augustus Constantin (Rm.Vâlcea)

17 August 2003 2	Dinamo București	1–0	FC Oradea	Bucharest
19:45 UTC+3	Bărcăuan 37'	Report		Stadium: Dinamo; Attendance: 2,000; Referee: Tiberiu Lajos (Timișoara)

23 August 2003 3	FC Oradea	0–0	Petrolul Ploiești	Oradea
18:00 UTC+3		Report		Stadium: Municipal; Attendance: 8,000; Referee: Alexandru Tudor (Bucharest)

30 August 2003 4	Poli AEK Timișoara	2–1	FC Oradea	Timișoara
18:00 UTC+3	Silvășan 38', 55'	Report	Keșerü 14'	Stadium: Dan Păltinișanu; Attendance: 20,000; Referee: Alexandru Deaconu (Bucharest)

13 September 2003 5	FC Oradea	1–2	Apulum Alba Iulia	Oradea
17:00 UTC+3	Mărginean 88'	Report	Dumitra 42' (o.g.); Moldovan 90+2'	Stadium: Municipal; Attendance: 8,000; Referee: Viorel Anghelinei (Galați)

20 September 2003 6	Ceahlăul Piatra Neamț	2–4	FC Oradea	Piatra Neamț
17:00 UTC+3	Burdujan 19'; T.Șerban 67'	Report	Vrăjitoarea 32', 59'; Dianu 86'; Fele 89'	Stadium: Ceahlăul; Attendance: 2,000; Referee: Alexandru Tudor (Bucharest)

27 September 2003 7	FC Oradea	2–1	Argeș Pitești	Oradea
17:00 UTC+3	Sfârlea 74' (pen.); Obrenović 82'	Report	N.Dică 11'	Stadium: Municipal; Attendance: 9,000; Referee: Lucian Dan (Aiud)

4 October 2003 8	Gloria Bistrița	2–1	FC Oradea	Bistrița
15:00 UTC+3	Coroian 20' (pen.); Minteuan 39'	Report	Vrăjitoarea 63'	Stadium: Gloria; Attendance: 600; Referee: Ionică Serea (Focșani)

3 December 2003 9	Steaua București	2–1	FC Oradea	Bucharest
17:00 UTC+2	Răducanu 36', 43'	Report	Sfârlea 78'	Stadium: Cotroceni; Attendance: 9,000; Referee: Tiberiu Lajos (Timișoara)

26 October 2003 10	FC Oradea	0–0	Național București	Oradea
15:00 UTC+3		Report		Stadium: Municipal; Attendance: 7,000; Referee: Sorin Corpodean (Alba Iulia)

1 November 2003 11	Oțelul Galați	1–0	FC Oradea	Galați
13:30 UTC+2	D.Orac 38'	Report		Stadium: Oțelul; Attendance: 5,000; Referee: Anton Heleșteanu (Iași)

8 November 2003 12	FC Oradea	3–0; 3–0 (forfait)	FCM Bacău	Oradea
14:00 UTC+2	Vrăjitoarea 13', 51'; Naidin 36' (pen.)	Report		Stadium: Municipal; Attendance: 9,000; Referee: Cristian Balaj (Baia Mare)

21 November 2003 13	FCU Craiova	4–1	FC Oradea	Craiova
16:00 UTC+2	Stîngă 32' (pen.); Pleșan 70'; Borbély 79'; N'Jock 84'	Report	Naidin 28'	Stadium: Ion Oblemenco; Attendance: 7,000; Referee: Alexandru Tudor (Bucharest)

29 November 2003 14	FC Oradea	5–1	Farul Constanța	Oradea
13:30 UTC+2	Vrăjitoarea 14'; Mărginean 24'; Stan 27', 45'; Lungan 89'	Report	F.Lungu 82'	Stadium: Municipal; Attendance: 6,000; Referee: Viorel Anghelinei (Galați)

6 December 2003 15	Brașov	2–1	FC Oradea	Brașov
13:30 UTC+2	Baicu 89'; Iorga 90+3'	Report	Stan 51'	Stadium: Tineretului; Attendance: 2,000; Referee: Marian Salomir (Cluj-Napoca)

12 March 2004 16	Rapid București	2–1	FC Oradea	Brașov
20:00 UTC+2	S.Ilie 38'; Niculae 81'	Report	Vrăjitoarea 64'	Stadium: Giulești; Attendance: 13,000; Referee: Tiberiu Lajos (Timișoara)

20 March 2004 17	FC Oradea	2–3	Dinamo București	Oradea
13:00 UTC+2	Vrăjitoarea 53'; Dianu 85'	Report	Fl.Petre 57'; Semeghin 60'; Niculescu 80'	Stadium: Municipal; Attendance: 12,000; Referee: Marian Salomir (Cluj-Napoca)

27 March 2004 18	Petrolul Ploiești	1–1	FC Oradea	Ploiești
20:00 UTC+2	Dăscălescu 90'	Report	Siljanoski 73'	Stadium: Astra; Attendance: 1,500; Referee: Alexandru Tudor (Bucharest)

4 April 2004 19	FC Oradea	2–3	Poli AEK Timișoara	Oradea
17:00 UTC+3	Vrăjitoarea 56', 80' (pen.)	Report	Oprea 10'; Silvășan 45'; Băd 85'	Stadium: Municipal; Attendance: 10,000; Referee: Sorin Corpodean (Alba Iulia)

9 April 2004 20	Apulum Alba Iulia	1–0	FC Oradea	Alba Iulia
16:00 UTC+3	Paleacu 5' (pen.)	Report		Stadium: Cetate; Attendance: 7,000; Referee: Sebastian Colțescu (Craiova)

14 April 2004 21	FC Oradea	2–1	Ceahlăul Piatra Neamț	Oradea
17:00 UTC+3	Siljanoski 24'; Vrăjitoarea 43'	Report	Burdujan 90'	Stadium: Municipal; Attendance: 7,500; Referee: Ionică Serea (Focșani)

17 April 2004 22	Argeș Pitești	2–0	FC Oradea	Pitești
16:30 UTC+3	Bilașco 59'; Ad.Ionescu 79'	Report		Stadium: Nicolae Dobrin; Attendance: 3,000; Referee: Tiberiu Lajos (Timișoara)

25 April 2004 23	FC Oradea	1–3	Gloria Bistrița	Oradea
17:00 UTC+3	Sfârlea 43'	Report	Negrean 9'; Coroian 61', 70'	Stadium: Municipal; Attendance: 8,000; Referee: Alexandru Deaconu (Bucharest)

2 May 2004 24	FC Oradea	0–3	Steaua București	Oradea
17:00 UTC+3		Report	Munteanu 20' (o.g.); Dumitra 24' (o.g.); N.Dică 26'	Stadium: Municipal; Attendance: 11,000; Referee: Ionică Serea (Focșani)

8 May 2004 25	Național București	2–3	FC Oradea	Bucharest
20:30 UTC+3	Savu 57'; Caramarin 89'	Report	Vrăjitoarea 37' (pen.); Stan 39', 63'	Stadium: Cotroceni; Attendance: 1,000; Referee: Viorel Anghelinei (Galați)

12 May 2004 26	FC Oradea	1–1	Oțelul Galați	Oradea
18:00 UTC+3	Lazăr 48'	Report	Aldea 22'	Stadium: Municipal; Attendance: 8,000; Referee: Marian Salomir (Cluj-Napoca)

15 May 2004 27	FCM Bacău	1–0	FC Oradea	Bacău
20:30 UTC+3	Baciu 33'	Report		Stadium: Dumitru Sechelariu; Attendance: 6,000; Referee: Sorin Corpodean (Alba Iulia)

22 May 2004 28	FC Oradea	0–1	FCU Craiova	Oradea
17:00 UTC+3		Report	Vigariu 58'	Stadium: Municipal; Attendance: 5,000; Referee: Alexandru Tudor (Bucharest)

30 May 2004 29	Farul Constanța	3–2	FC Oradea	Constanța
17:00 UTC+3	Guriță 23'; L.Mihai 31', 88' (pen.)	Report	Stan 55'; Gado 84' (pen.)	Stadium: Gheorghe Hagi; Attendance: 300; Referee: Viorel Sandu (Bucharest)

3 June 2004 30	FC Oradea	2–2	Brașov	Oradea
17:00 UTC+3	Vrăjitoarea 7'; Lungan 60'	Report	Fl.Stângă 41'; Stere 88'	Stadium: Municipal; Attendance: 1,500; Referee: Silviu Bogdan (Craiova)

=== Cupa României ===
8 October 2003 Round of 32	ACU Arad	1–2	FC Oradea	Arad
15:00 UTC+3	Pocian 39'	Report	Nicolae 28'; Stan 84'	Stadium: Astra; Attendance: 700; Referee: Vasile Bratu (Amara)

21 October 2003 Round of 16	FC Oradea	0–1	Rapid București	Bucharest
20:00 UTC+3		Report	Ilyés 14'	Stadium: Național; Attendance: 500; Referee: Viorel Anghelinei (Galați)

== See also ==
- 2003–04 Cupa României
- Divizia A
