= 2004–05 FC Bihor Oradea (1958) season =

FC Oradea
2004–05 season
- Owner: Oradea Municipality; Bihor County Council
- Chairman: Ioan Lăzău (pre-season); Emerich Jenei (1–25); Sorin Husăsan (26–30)
- Manager: Marian Bondrea (1–18); Zsolt Muzsnay (19–26); Viorel Abrudan (27–30)
- Stadium: Municipal
- Divizia B: 3rd
- Cupa României: Fifth Round
- Top goalscorer: League: Daniel Stan (14); All: Daniel Stan (14)
- Highest home attendance: 5,000 vs Jiul Petroșani (23 October 2004)
- Lowest home attendance: 300 vs IS Câmpia Turzii (11 June 2005)
- Average home league attendance: 1,871
Home colours	Away colours

The 2004–05 season was Bihor Oradea's 46th season in the Romanian football league system, and their 26th season in the Divizia B. At the end of the season the team finished on 3rd place, far away from the promotion place, which was the goal of the team at the start of the season. The season was a tumultuous one for the management, technical staff and players, the club's management being vehemently criticized for defective management and being dismissed with 5 rounds before the end of the season. Also 3 head coaches were changed during this season. This was the last season when FC Bihor was known as FC Oradea.

== First team squad ==
Note: Flags indicate national team as defined under FIFA eligibility rules; some limited exceptions apply. Players may hold more than one non-FIFA nationality.

No.	Pos.	Nation	Player
—	GK	ROU	Valentin Axinte
—	GK	ROU	Adrian Mihai
—	GK	ROU	Cosmin Vâtcă
—	DF	ROU	Sebastian Achim
—	DF	ROU	Bogdan Cistean
—	DF	ROU	Ciprian Dianu (Captain)
—	DF	ROU	Adrian Gongolea
—	DF	ROU	Florin Lazăr
—	DF	ROU	Mihai Lungan
—	DF	ROU	Cristian Lupuț
—	DF	ROU	Dorin Mihuț
—	DF	ROU	Cristian Munteanu
—	DF	ROU	Florin Pătrașcu
—	DF	ROU	Mădălin Popa
—	MF	ROU	Cristian Bălașa
—	MF	ROU	Sorin Bugiu
—	MF	ROU	Marian Galbenu
—	MF	ROU	Răzvan Fărcuța

No.	Pos.	Nation	Player
—	MF	ROU	Sándor Fele
—	MF	ROU	Ramses Gado
—	MF	ROU	Ovidiu Hoban
—	MF	ROU	Árpád Laczkó
—	MF	ROU	Sebastian Sfârlea
—	MF	ROU	Ilie Stoican
—	MF	ROU	Raul Șarkadi
—	MF	ROU	Grigorie Tudor
—	FW	ROU	Claudiu Balaci
—	FW	ROU	Csaba Borbély
—	FW	ROU	Dumitru Gavrilescu
—	FW	ROU	Alexandru Gego
—	FW	ROU	Raymond Lukács
—	FW	ROU	Daniel Lupașcu
—	FW	ROU	Mircea Madar
—	FW	ROU	Florin Neaga
—	FW	ROU	Constantin Oprea
—	FW	ROU	Daniel Stan

== Pre-season and friendlies ==
14 July 2004	Debrecen (Hungary)	6–0	(Romania) FC Oradea	Debrecen, Hungary
20:30 UTC+3	Enyinnaya 15'; Kiss 44'; Hegedűs 50'; Leonardo 76'; Kolbe 86'; Szatmári 90'	Report		Stadium: Oláh Gábor; Attendance: 1,000

15 July 2004	FC Oradea (Romania)	1–1	(Romania) Tricotaje Ineu	Oradea, Romania
18:00 UTC+3	Elisei 45'	Report	Liga 77'	Stadium: Municipal; Attendance: 600; Referee: Laurențiu Danșa (Oradea)

22 July 2004	FC Oradea (Romania)	–	(Romania) Regiana Cefa	Oradea, Romania
18:30 UTC+3				Stadium: Municipal

23 July 2004	FC Oradea (Romania)	–	(Romania) Lotus Băile Felix	Oradea, Romania
18:30 UTC+3				Stadium: Municipal

24 July 2004	FC Oradea (Romania)	3–0	(Romania) Unirea Sânnicolau Mare	Oradea, Romania
10:30 UTC+3	Balaci 15'; Gado 58', 60' (pen.)	Report		Stadium: Municipal; Attendance: 200; Referee: Florin Marcu (Oradea)

1 August 2004	Gmunden (Austria)	0–1	(Romania) FC Oradea	Filzmoos, Austria
20:30 UTC+3		Report	Gado 26'	Stadium: Filzmoos

1 August 2004	Pro Sesto (Italy)	0–0	(Romania) FC Oradea	Filzmoos, Austria
21:30 UTC+3		Report		Stadium: Filzmoos

4 August 2004	Gmunden (Austria)	1–6	(Romania) FC Oradea	Filzmoos, Austria
20:30 UTC+3	73'	Report	Balaci 20', 27'; Gado 30' (pen.); Sfârlea 37' (pen.); Stan 75'; Oprea 78'	Stadium: Filzmoos

5 August 2004	Kickers Stavenhagen (Germany)	0–10	(Romania) FC Oradea	Filzmoos, Austria
20:30 UTC+3			Oprea 4'; Pașca 12'; Balaci 23'; Fele 54', 56'; Stoican 64'; Fărcuța 74', 75'; Madar 82'; Galbenu 86'	Stadium: Filzmoos

6 August 2004	Olympiacos (Greece)	–	(Romania) FC Oradea	Filzmoos, Austria
20:30 UTC+3				Stadium: Filzmoos

26 January 2005	Voința Inand (Romania)	0–7	(Romania) FC Oradea	Inand, Romania
13:30 UTC+2		Report	Oprea; Popescu; Stan; Laczkó; Balaci	Stadium: Voința

26 January 2005	Regiana Cefa (Romania)	0–4	(Romania) FC Oradea	Inand, Romania
14:45 UTC+2		Report	Gavrilescu; Oprea; Kovács (o.g.); Balaci	Stadium: Voința

28 January 2005	Lotus Băile Felix (Romania)	1–5	(Romania) FC Oradea	Cihei, Romania
15:00 UTC+2	Morna 10'	Report	Balaci 26' (pen.); Stan 50', 81'; Gavrilescu 57', 83'	Stadium: Cihei; Referee: Ciprian Danşa (Oradea)

29 January 2005	FC Oradea (Romania)	0–1	(Romania) Apulum Alba Iulia	Beiuș, Romania
11:00 UTC+2		Report	Jercălău 12' (pen.)	Stadium: Bihorul; Referee: Nicolae Nicolae (Beiuș)

4 February 2005	FC Oradea (Romania)	4–2	(Romania) Politehnica Iași	Oradea, Romania
11:00 UTC+2	Tudor 13'; Stan 39', 42'; Balaci 47'	Report	Pălimaru 25'; M.Păcurar 92'	Stadium: Municipal; Attendance: 150; Referee: Laurenţiu Danşa (Oradea)

8 February 2005	Vaslui (Romania)	1–2	(Romania) FC Oradea	Norcia, Italy
15:30 UTC+2	Frunză 55' (pen.)	Report	Lazăr 70'; Balaci 76' (pen.)	Stadium: Salicone

11 February 2005	Pobeda Prilep (North Macedonia)	0–3	(Romania) FC Oradea	Norcia, Italy
15:30 UTC+2		Report	Stan 18'; Munteanu 34'; Balaci 60'	Stadium: Salicone

13 February 2005	Svoboda Ljubljana (Slovenia)	0–1	(Romania) FC Oradea	Norcia, Italy
15:30 UTC+2		Report	Lazăr 88'	Stadium: Salicone

16 February 2005	Wisła Płock (Poland)	0–1	(Romania) FC Oradea	Norcia, Italy
15:30 UTC+2		Report	Oprea 68'	Stadium: Salicone

18 February 2005	Politehnica Iași (Romania)	3–3 (a.e.t.) (4–3 p)	(Romania) FC Oradea	Norcia, Italy
15:30 UTC+2	Miclea 25'; Onofraș 40'; Baldovin 80'	Report	Stan 22', 57'; Mihuț 62'	Stadium: Salicone
	Penalties
	Cl.Ionescu (penalty scored); Stanciu (penalty scored); Bâlbă (penalty missed); Onofraș (penalty scored); Bogdanović (penalty scored)		Munteanu (penalty scored); Sfârlea (penalty scored); M.Popa (penalty missed); Berde (penalty scored); Laczkó (penalty missed)

23 February 2005	Debrecen (Hungary)	2–0	(Romania) FC Oradea	Vámospércs, Hungary
16:00 UTC+2	Sándor 9'; Bogdanović 11'	Report		Stadium: Vámospércs; Attendance: 200

28 February 2005	Lotus Băile Felix (Romania)	0–1	(Romania) FC Oradea	Cihei, Romania
14:00 UTC+2		Report	Munteanu 22'	Stadium: Cihei; Referee: Lucian Ciocan (Oradea)

28 February 2005	Bihorul Beiuș (Romania)	2–2	(Romania) FC Oradea	Cihei, Romania
15:45 UTC+2	Rus 10'; P.Luca 47'	Report	Munteanu 17' (pen.); Neaga 25'	Stadium: Cihei; Referee: Lucian Ciocan (Oradea)

4 March 2005	FC Oradea (Romania)	4–0	(Romania) Dinamo București	Oradea, Romania
15:00 UTC+2	Mihuț 15'; Stan 16'; Balaci 57'; Oprea 84'	Report		Stadium: Municipal; Attendance: 4,000; Referee: Florin Marcu (Oradea)

3 June 2005	FC Oradea (Romania)	–	(Romania) CFR Cluj	Oradea, Romania
17:00 UTC+3				Stadium: Municipal

3 June 2005	Politehnica Timișoara (Romania)	–	(Romania) FC Oradea	Timișoara, Romania
20:00 UTC+3				Stadium: Dan Păltinișanu

== Competitions ==
=== Seria III ===
Pos	Team	Pld	W	D	L	GF	GA	GD	Pts	Qualification
1	Jiul Petroșani (C, P)	28	20	5	3	64	19	+45	65	Promotion to Divizia A
2	Gaz Metan Mediaș	28	20	5	3	48	19	+29	65	
3	FC Oradea	28	15	6	7	41	24	+17	51	
4	Olimpia Satu Mare	28	15	4	9	37	23	+14	49	
5	Liberty Salonta	28	11	9	8	37	34	+3	42	
6	Armătura Zalău	28	10	11	7	44	32	+12	41	
7	Universitatea Cluj	28	12	4	12	41	33	+8	40	
8	IS Câmpia Turzii	28	10	7	11	27	39	−12	37	
9	Tricotaje Ineu (Note: Trcotaje Ineu sold its place in the second tier to FCM Reșița, at the end of the season.) (R)	28	10	5	13	42	53	−11	35	Relegation to Divizia C
10	Unirea Sânicolau Mare	28	9	7	12	32	41	−9	34	
11	UTA Arad	28	9	6	13	31	40	−9	33	
12	Deva (Note: Deva sold its place in the second tier to Corvinul 2005 Hunedoara, at the end of the season. Deva played next season in the third tier.) (R)	28	8	6	14	30	39	−9	30	Relegation to Divizia C
13	Unirea Dej	28	8	4	16	27	42	−15	28	
14	Oașul Negrești (R)	28	7	1	20	24	56	−32	22	Relegation to Divizia C
15	ACU Arad (R)	28	1	10	17	16	47	−31	13	Relegation to Divizia C
16	Corvinul Hunedoara (Note: Corvinul Hunedoara was excluded in the first part of the season and all its results were cancelled. At the end of the season Corvinul 2005 (an unofficial successor) bought Deva's place in the second tier.) (R)	0	0	0	0	0	0	0	0	Relegation to Divizia C

Updated to match(es) played on 30 June 2005. Source: romaniansoccer.ro (in Romanian)
Rules for classification: 1) Points; 2) Head-to-head points; 3) Head-to-head goal difference; 4) Head-to-head goals scored; 5) Head-to-head away goals scored; 6) Goal difference; 7) Goals scored.
(C) Champions; (P) Promoted; (R) Relegated

==== Result round by round ====
Round	1	2	3	4	5	6	7	8	9	10	11	12	13	14	15	16	17	18	19	20	21	22	23	24	25	26	27	28	29	30
Ground	H	A	A	H	A	H	A	H	A	H	A	H	A	H	A	A	H	H	A	H	A	H	A	H	A	H	A	H	A	H
Result	D	W	W	W	L	D	W	W	W	L	L	W	D	P	W	D	D	W	D	W	L	L	L	W	W	W	W	L	P	W
Position	9	4	2	1	4	4	2	1	2	3	3	3	3	3	3	3	3	3	3	3	4	4	4	4	3	3	3	3	3	3

Source: 2004–05 Divizia B
A = Away; H = Home; W = Win; D = Draw; L = Loss; P = Postponed

==== Results ====
21 August 2004 1	FC Oradea	1–1	Liberty Salonta	Oradea
11:00 UTC+3	Balaci 60'	Report	Luca 71'	Stadium: Municipal; Attendance: 4,500; Referee: Sorin Altmayer (Timișoara)

28 August 2004 2	Universitatea Cluj	2–3	FC Oradea	Cluj-Napoca
11:00 UTC+3	Jula 5', 64'	Report	Fele 19'; Stan 50'; Cr.Bălașa 80'	Stadium: Ion Moina; Attendance: 2,000; Referee: Alexandru Rojneai (Alba Iulia)

4 September 2004 3	ACU Arad	0–4	FC Oradea	Arad
11:00 UTC+3		Report	Balaci 1'; Gado 16'; Stan 37', 47'	Stadium: Astra; Attendance: 500; Referee: Sebastian Colţescu (Craiova)

11 September 2004 4	FC Oradea	2–1	Unirea Sânnicolau Mare	Oradea
11:00 UTC+3	Balaci 83'; Fele 85'	Report	Vezan 52'	Stadium: Municipal; Attendance: 2,000; Referee: Gabriel Mocean (Câmpia Turzii)

18 September 2004 5	Tricotaje Ineu	2–1	FC Oradea	Ineu
11:00 UTC+3	Mițiți 76', 90+1'	Report	Stan 11'	Stadium: Central-Parc; Attendance: 1,000; Referee: Tiberiu Lajos (Timișoara)

25 September 2004 6	FC Oradea	0–0	Olimpia Satu Mare	Oradea
11:00 UTC+3		Report		Stadium: Municipal; Attendance: 800; Referee: Victor Berbecaru (Rm.Vâlcea)

2 October 2004 7	Unirea Dej	0–4	FC Oradea	Dej
11:00 UTC+3		Report	Sfârlea 37'; Stan 42'; Balaci 51'; Gongolea 76'	Stadium: Unirea; Attendance: 300; Referee: Marius Martiş (Focșani)

9 October 2004 8	FC Oradea	3–1	Gaz Metan Mediaș	Oradea
11:00 UTC+3	Tudor 7'; Gado 27'; Stan 44'	Report	Boaru 60'	Stadium: Municipal; Attendance: 4,000; Referee: Ionică Serea (Focșani)

16 October 2004 9	CS Deva	0–3	FC Oradea	Deva
11:00 UTC+3		Report	Stan 27'; Gado 60'; Tudor 89'	Stadium: Cetate; Attendance: 400; Referee: Robert Dumitru (Brașov)

23 October 2004 10	FC Oradea	0–3	Jiul Petroșani	Oradea
11:00 UTC+3		Report	M.Voicu 11' (pen.); Apetri 75'; Movilă 90'	Stadium: Municipal; Attendance: 5,000; Referee: Anton Heleşteanu (Iaşi)

30 October 2004 11	UTA Arad	1–0	FC Oradea	Arad
11:00 UTC+3	Apostu 85'	Report		Stadium: UTA; Attendance: 1,500; Referee: Cristian Balaj (Baia Mare)

6 November 2004 12	FC Oradea	2–1	Oașul Negrești	Oradea
11:00 UTC+2	Balaci 41'; Gongolea 88'	Report	Costrabă 7'	Stadium: Municipal; Attendance: 1,500; Referee: Alexandru Rojneai (Alba Iulia)

13 November 2004 13	Armătura Zalău	0–0	FC Oradea	Zalău
11:00 UTC+2		Report		Stadium: Municipal; Attendance: 1,000; Referee: Mugurel Drăgănescu (Breaza)

20 November 2004 14	FC Oradea	Canceled	Corvinul Hunedoara	Oradea
11:00 UTC+2		Report		Stadium: Municipal

27 November 2004 15	IS Câmpia Turzii	0–1	FC Oradea	Câmpia Turzii
11:00 UTC+2		Report	Stan 51'	Stadium: ISCT; Attendance: 600; Referee: Lucian Dan (Aiud)

12 March 2005 16	Liberty Salonta	0–0	FC Oradea	Salonta
11:00 UTC+2		Report		Stadium: Liberty; Attendance: 1,500; Referee: Viorel Sandu (Bucharest)

19 March 2005 17	FC Oradea	0–0	Universitatea Cluj	Oradea
11:00 UTC+2		Report		Stadium: Municipal; Attendance: 2,500; Referee: Ludovic Ujhely (Lugoj)

26 March 2005 18	FC Oradea	2–0	ACU Arad	Oradea
11:00 UTC+2	Munteanu 55'; Gado 62'	Report		Stadium: Municipal; Attendance: 900; Referee: Sorin Tarcea (Timișoara)

2 April 2005 19	Unirea Sânnicolau Mare	0–0	FC Oradea	Sânnicolau Mare
11:00 UTC+3		Report		Stadium: Unirea; Attendance: 500; Referee: Sebastian Colţescu (Craiova)

9 April 2005 20	FC Oradea	1–0	Tricotaje Ineu	Oradea
11:00 UTC+3	Neaga 87'	Report		Stadium: Municipal; Attendance: 1,000; Referee: Cristina Ionescu (Vulcan)

16 April 2005 21	Olimpia Satu Mare	1–0	FC Oradea	Satu Mare
11:00 UTC+3	Lupuț 26' (o.g.)	Report		Stadium: Olimpia; Attendance: 500; Referee: Valentin Igna (Timișoara)

23 April 2005 22	FC Oradea	4–0; 0–3 (forfait)	Unirea Dej	Oradea
11:00 UTC+3	Stan 3', 34'; Gado 61'; Neaga 90'	Report		Stadium: Municipal; Attendance: 1,000; Referee: Vasile Balaj (Reșița)

29 April 2005 23	Gaz Metan Mediaș	2–1	FC Oradea	Mediaș
11:00 UTC+3	Mureșan 38'; Stoica 68'	Report	Stan 90+3'	Stadium: Gaz Metan; Attendance: 800; Referee: Vasile Bratu (Amara)

7 May 2005 24	FC Oradea	3–1	CS Deva	Oradea
11:00 UTC+3	Borbély 30'; Fele 47' (pen.); Gado 88'	Report	Moț 45'	Stadium: Municipal; Attendance: 700; Referee: Teodora Albon (Cluj-Napoca)

11 May 2005 25	Jiul Petroșani	1–2	FC Oradea	Petroșani
11:00 UTC+3	Apetri 78'	Report	Stan 10'; Neaga 65'	Stadium: Jiul; Attendance: 2,000; Referee: Sebastian Colţescu (Craiova)

14 May 2005 26	FC Oradea	2–1	UTA Arad	Oradea
11:00 UTC+3	Stan 4'; Munteanu 65'	Report	Răduț 90'	Stadium: Municipal; Attendance: 1,500; Referee: Teodor Crăciunescu (Rm.Vâlcea)

21 May 2005 27	Oașul Negrești	2–3	FC Oradea	Negrești-Oaș
11:00 UTC+3	Ilea 43', 69'	Report	M.Popa 65'; Lupuț 82'; Stan 83'	Stadium: Orășenesc; Attendance: 300; Referee: George Luca (Bistrița)

28 May 2005 28	FC Oradea	0–1	Armătura Zalău	Oradea
11:00 UTC+3		Report	Gorga 44'	Stadium: Municipal; Attendance: 500; Referee: Sorin Mocan (Cluj-Napoca)

4 June 2005 29	Corvinul Hunedoara	Canceled	FC Oradea	Hunedoara
11:00 UTC+3		Report		Stadium: Michael Klein

11 June 2005 30	FC Oradea	3–0	IS Câmpia Turzii	Oradea
11:00 UTC+3	Tudor 26'; Cistean 55'; Lukács 90+1'	Report		Stadium: Municipal; Attendance: 300; Referee: Ovidiu Haţegan (Arad)

=== Cupa României ===
15 September 2004 Fifth Round	Armătura Zalău	3–1	FC Oradea	Zalău
16:00 UTC+3	Gorga 44', 54'; Sabău 75'	Report	Stan 50'	Stadium: Municipal; Attendance: 1,000; Referee: Ovidiu Hațegan (Arad)

== See also ==
- 2004–05 Cupa României
- Divizia B
