= 2005–06 Divizia B =

Divizia B
- Season: 2005–06
- Promoted: Ceahlăul Piatra Neamț; FC U Craiova; Liberty Salonta; Unirea Urziceni
- Relegated: Gloria II Bistrița; Altay Medgidia; Astra Ploiești; Callatis Mangalia; Minerul Motru; Olimpia Satu Mare; Inter Gaz București; Petrolul Moinești; Rapid II București; Laminorul Roman; Juventus București; UTA Arad; Portul Constanța; Dinamo II București; Unirea Sânnicolau Mare; Midia Năvodari; FC Sibiu; Armătura Zalău
- Top goalscorer: Tiberiu Șerban (18 goals)

The 2005–06 Divizia B was the 66th season of the second tier of the Romanian football league system.

The format has been maintained to three series, each of them consisting of 16 teams. At the end of the season, the winners of the series promoted to Divizia A and the last six places from all the series relegated to Divizia C. A promotion play-off was played between the runners-up of the Divizia B series to decide the fourth promoted team. A special ranking was made between the 10th place teams of every series and the team with the worst ranking in this standing was relegated, as well. These changes in promotion and relegation rules were made because starting with the next season, Romanian football league system was reformed.

== Team changes ==
=== To Divizia B ===
Promoted from Divizia C

- Cetatea Suceava
- Portul Constanța
- Dunărea Giurgiu
- Poiana Câmpina
- Râmnicu Vâlcea
- CFR Timișoara
- Minerul Lupeni
- Forex Brașov
- Gloria Bistrița II
- FCM Reșița**

Relegated from Divizia A

- Apulum Alba Iulia
- FC Brașov
- FC U Craiova

=== From Divizia B ===
Relegated to Divizia C

- Tricotaje Ineu**
- Internațional Pitești**
- Deva**
- Ghimbav
- Building Vânju Mare
- Oașul Negrești
- Unirea Focșani
- Oltul Slatina
- ACU Arad
- Politehnica Timișoara
- Rulmentul Alexandria
- Corvinul Hunedoara

Promoted to Divizia A

- FC Vaslui
- Pandurii Târgu Jiu
- Jiul Petroșani

=== Note (**) ===
Tricotaje Ineu sold its Divizia B place to FCM Reșița.

Internațional Pitești sold its Divizia B place to Astra Ploiești, club which split from Petrolul Ploiești, after only one season since their merge.

CS Deva sold its Divizia B place to Corvinul 2005 Hunedoara, an unofficial successor of Corvinul Hunedoara, club which was dissolved at the end of the previous season.

=== Renamed teams ===
Altay Constanța was moved from Constanța to Medgidia and renamed as Altay Medgidia.

FC Oradea was renamed as Bihor Oradea.

CSM Reșița split from the merge with FC U Craiova, which second team was in the last season of the third tier and was renamed as FCM Reșița.

== League tables ==
=== Seria I ===
Pos	Team	Pld	W	D	L	GF	GA	GD	Pts	Qualification or relegation
1	Ceahlăul Piatra Neamț (C, P)	30	20	6	4	59	20	+39	66	Promotion to Liga I
2	Forex Brașov	30	18	5	7	55	31	+24	59	Qualification to Promotion play-off
3	FC Brașov	30	17	8	5	57	22	+35	58 (Note: FC Brașov was deducted 1 point due to not achieving the 22 points limit in the Divizia A, last season.)	
4	Botoșani	30	15	4	11	32	29	+3	49	
5	Cetatea Suceava	30	14	4	12	43	34	+9	46	
6	Precizia Săcele	30	12	9	9	26	24	+2	45	
7	Dacia Unirea Brăila	30	12	9	9	31	28	+3	45	
8	Dunărea Galați	30	12	7	11	29	26	+3	43	
9	Gloria Buzău	30	12	7	11	37	29	+8	43	
10	Altay Medgidia (Note: Altay Medgidia withdrew at the end of the season.) (R)	30	12	6	12	33	37	−4	42	Possible relegation to Liga III
11	Callatis Mangalia (R)	30	11	6	13	34	39	−5	39	Relegation to Liga III
12	FCM Târgoviște (Note: FCM Târgoviște was spared from relegation after Altay Medgidia withdrew.)	30	10	8	12	29	30	−1	38	Spared from relegation
13	Petrolul Moinești (R)	30	8	8	14	33	44	−11	32	Relegation to Liga III
14	Laminorul Roman (R)	30	7	7	16	30	47	−17	28	Relegation to Liga III
15	Portul Constanța (R)	30	7	6	17	35	60	−25	27	Relegation to Liga III
16	Midia Năvodari (Note: Midia Năvodari withdrew during the winther break and lost all the matches from the second part of the season by forfeit.) (R)	30	1	4	25	6	69	−63	7	Relegation to Liga III

Updated to match(es) played on 30 June 2006. Source: romaniansoccer.ro (in Romanian)
Rules for classification: 1) Points; 2) Head-to-head points; 3) Head-to-head goal difference; 4) Head-to-head goals scored; 5) Head-to-head away goals scored; 6) Goal difference; 7) Goals scored.
(C) Champions; (P) Promoted; (R) Relegated

=== Seria II ===
Pos	Team	Pld	W	D	L	GF	GA	GD	Pts	Qualification or relegation
1	FC U Craiova (C, P)	30	20	4	6	41	14	+27	62 (Note: 'FC U Craiova were deducted 2 points due to not achieving the 22 points limit in the Divizia A, last season.)	Promotion to Liga I
2	Unirea Urziceni (O, P)	30	18	5	7	55	24	+31	59	Qualification to Promotion play-off
3	Petrolul Ploiești	30	17	5	8	47	29	+18	56	
4	Otopeni	30	15	9	6	37	18	+19	54	
5	Dunărea Giurgiu	30	16	3	11	35	33	+2	51	
6	Râmnicu Vâlcea	30	11	12	7	37	27	+10	45	
7	Poiana Câmpina	30	12	9	9	34	28	+6	45	
8	Dacia Mioveni	30	12	8	10	36	30	+6	44	
9	FC Caracal	30	13	4	13	35	38	−3	43	
10	Astra Ploiești (R)	30	12	4	14	45	48	−3	40	Possible relegation to Liga III
11	Minerul Motru (R)	30	9	10	11	32	34	−2	37	Relegation to Liga III
12	Inter Gaz București (R)	30	9	9	12	30	40	−10	36	Relegation to Liga III
13	Rapid II București (R)	30	10	2	18	27	56	−29	32	Relegation to Liga III
14	Juventus București (R)	30	7	4	19	29	49	−20	25	Relegation to Liga III
15	Dinamo II București (R)	30	4	8	18	25	43	−18	20	Relegation to Liga III
16	FC Sibiu (R)	30	3	8	19	12	46	−34	17	Relegation to Liga III

Updated to match(es) played on 30 June 2006. Source: romaniansoccer.ro (in Romanian)
Rules for classification: 1) Points; 2) Head-to-head points; 3) Head-to-head goal difference; 4) Head-to-head goals scored; 5) Head-to-head away goals scored; 6) Goal difference; 7) Goals scored.
(C) Champions; (O) Play-off winners; (P) Promoted; (R) Relegated

=== Seria III ===
Pos	Team	Pld	W	D	L	GF	GA	GD	Pts	Qualification or relegation
1	Liberty Salonta (C, P)	28	17	7	4	37	16	+21	58	Promotion to Liga I
2	Bihor Oradea	28	17	4	7	53	27	+26	55	Qualification to Promotion play-off
3	Universitatea Cluj	28	15	9	4	44	16	+28	54	
4	Gaz Metan Mediaș	28	15	6	7	38	21	+17	51	
5	FCM Reșița	28	11	7	10	26	29	−3	40	
6	Corvinul 2005 Hunedoara	28	10	8	10	33	35	−2	38	
7	CFR Timișoara	28	10	6	12	33	40	−7	36	
8	Gloria Bistrița II (Note: Gloria Bistrița II withdrew at the end of the season.) (R)	28	10	6	12	25	34	−9	36	Relegation to Liga III
9	Industria Sărmei Câmpia Turzii	28	8	10	10	30	29	+1	34	
10	Minerul Lupeni	28	9	7	12	26	31	−5	34	Possible relegation to Liga III
11	Olimpia Satu Mare (R)	28	9	5	14	24	36	−12	32	Relegation to Liga III
12	Unirea Dej (Note: Unirea Dej was spared from relegation after Gloria Bistrița II withdrew.)	28	9	5	14	29	37	−8	32	Spared from relegation
13	Apulum Alba Iulia (Note: Apulum Alba Iulia was spared from relegation after newly promoted Oltchim Râmnicu Vâlcea refused the promotion.)	28	6	10	12	21	31	−10	28	Spared from relegation
14	UTA Arad (R)	28	6	9	13	25	35	−10	27	Relegation to Liga III
15	Unirea Sânnicolau Mare (R)	28	6	5	17	21	48	−27	23	Relegation to Liga III
16	Armătura Zalău (Note: Armătura Zalău was excluded in the first part of the season and all its results were cancelled.) (D)	0	0	0	0	0	0	0	0	Withdrew

Updated to match(es) played on 30 June 2006. Source: romaniansoccer.ro (in Romanian)
Rules for classification: 1) Points; 2) Head-to-head points; 3) Head-to-head goal difference; 4) Head-to-head goals scored; 5) Head-to-head away goals scored; 6) Goal difference; 7) Goals scored.
(C) Champions; (D) Disqualified; (P) Promoted; (R) Relegated

== Promotion play-off ==
In the following season, the Liga I was expanded from 16 teams to 18 teams, therefore the Romanian Football Federation decided that a promotion playoff group would be played at the end of the season, between the second placed teams from each series of the Liga II, in order to establish the fourth promoted team (in exchange to the two teams relegated from the Liga I). The winner of this group, Unirea Urziceni, promoted to the Liga I, along with the three winners of the series.

Pos	Team	Pld	W	D	L	GF	GA	GD	Pts	Promotion
1	Unirea Urziceni (O, P)	2	2	0	0	5	2	+3	6	Promotion to Liga I
2	Forex Brașov	2	1	0	1	2	1	+1	3	
3	Bihor Oradea	2	0	0	2	2	6	−4	0	

(O) Play-off winners; (P) Promoted

10 June 2006	Forex Brașov	2–0	Bihor Oradea	Lia Manoliu
18:00	Manea 44'; Coman 76'	Report		Attendance: 1,000; Referee: Alexandru Tudor (Bucharest)

14 June 2006	Unirea Urziceni	4–2	Bihor Oradea	Lia Manoliu
18:00	Constantin 10'; Gheorghe 23' (pen.); Zaharia 34'; Predescu 45'	Report	Neaga 19'; Foro 72'	Attendance: 2,000; Referee: Sorin Corpodean (Alba Iulia)

17 June 2006	Forex Brașov	0–1	Unirea Urziceni	Lia Manoliu
18:00		Report	Predescu 21'	Attendance: 4,000; Referee: Alexandru Deaconu (Bucharest)

== Possible relegation ==
At the end of the season, a special table was made between 10th places from the 3 series. The last team in this table was also relegated in the Liga III. In this table, 10th place teams are included without the points obtained against teams that relegated in their series.

Pos	Team	Pld	W	D	L	GF	GA	GD	Pts	Relegation
1	Altay Medgidia	18	8	1	9	17	28	−11	25	
2	Minerul Lupeni	18	7	3	8	19	22	−3	24	
3	Astra Ploiești (R)	18	6	2	10	23	35	−12	20	Relegation to Liga III

Source: RSSSF
Rules for classification: 1) Points; 2) Goal difference; 3) Goals scored.
(R) Relegated

== Top scorers ==
18 goals

- (Romania) Tiberiu Șerban (Ceahlăul Piatra Neamț)

14 goals

- (Romania) Dorel Zaharia (Unirea Urziceni)

8 goals

- (Romania) Dumitru Gheorghe (Unirea Urziceni)
- (Romania) Lucian Itu (Minerul Lupeni)
- (Romania) János Székely (Universitatea Cluj)

7 goals

- (Romania) Claudiu Boaru (Gaz Metan Mediaș)

5 goals

- (Romania) Claudiu Ionescu (Dacia Mioveni)
- (Romania) Radu Neguț (FC Sibiu)

4 goals

- (Romania) Mircea Bornescu (FC U Craiova)
- (Romania) Laurențiu Buș (Universitatea Cluj)
- (Romania) Daniel Stan (Bihor Oradea)

== See also ==
- 2005–06 Divizia A
- 2005–06 Divizia D
- 2005–06 Cupa României
