= Mădălin =

Mădălin is a Romanian male given name that may refer to:

- Mădălin Ciucă (born 1982), Romanian footballer
- Mădălin Lemnaru (born 1989), Romanian rugby union player
- Mădălin Marius Popa (born 1982), Romanian footballer and manager
- Mădălin Martin (born 1992), Romanian footballer
- Mădălin Mihăescu (born 1988), Romanian footballer
- Mădălin Murgan (born 1983), Romanian football player
- Mădălin Popa (born 1983), Romanian footballer
- Mădălin Răileanu (born 1997), Romanian footballer
- Mădălin Smaranda (born 1984), Romanian footballer
- Mădălin Staicu (born 1990), Romanian footballer
- Mădălin Stancu (born 1992), Romanian footballer
- Mădălin Voicu (born 1952), Romanian musician and politician
