= Staicu =

Staicu is a Romanian surname. Notable people with this surname include:

- Ana-Maria Staicu, Romanian-American statistician
- Dragoș Staicu (born 1985), Romanian alpine skier
- Ion Staicu (1927–1967), Romanian bobsledder
- Marius Staicu (born 1987), Romanian footballer
- Mădălin Staicu (born 1990), Romanian footballer
- Simona Staicu (born 1971), Romanian runner

== Other ==
- Staicu river, tributary of the Jiul de Est, Romania
