= Marius Postolache =

Romanian footballer

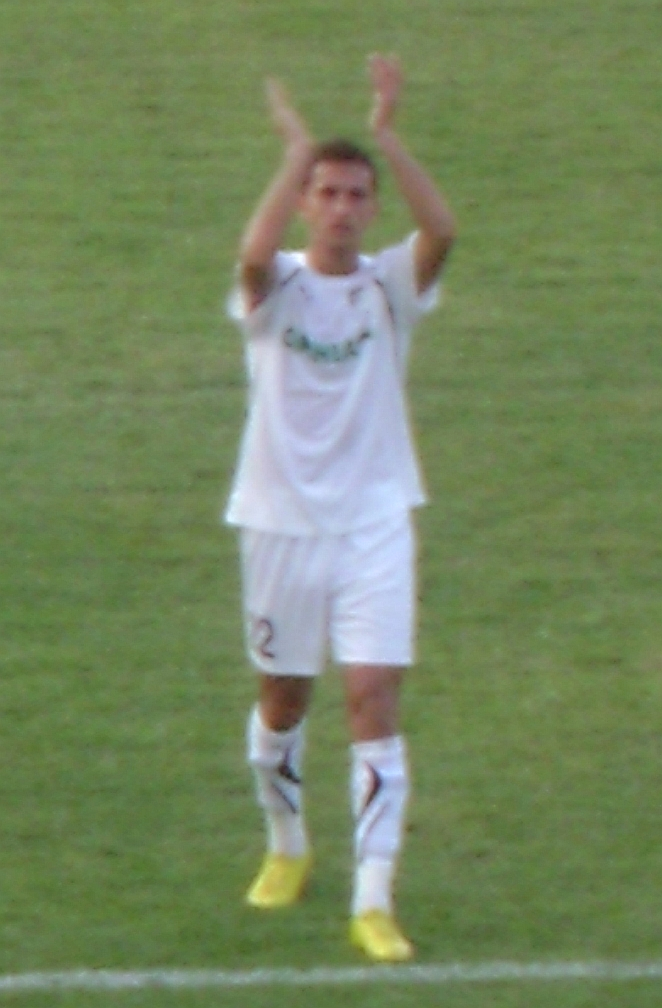

Personal information
- Full name: Marius Postolache
- Date of birth: 11 February 1984 (age 42)
- Place of birth: Timișoara, Romania
- Height: 1.77 m (5 ft 10 in)
- Position: Midfielder

Senior career*
Years	Team	Apps	(Gls)
2004–2005	Unirea Sânnicolau Mare	14	(1)
2005–2006	Rapid II București	12	(0)
2006–2011	Sportul Studenţesc	109	(9)
2011	Politehnica II Timișoara	7	(1)
2011	Delta Tulcea	14	(1)
2012–2013	Voința Sibiu	0	(0)
Total		156	(12)
- * Club domestic league appearances and goals as of 20 January 2012

Marius Postolache (born 11 February 1984) is a Romanian football player who played as a midfielder.
