= Mărginean =

Mărginean is a Romanian surname. Notable people with the surname include:

- Cosmin Mărginean (born 1978), Romanian footballer
- Gabriela Mărginean (born 1987), Romanian women's basketball player
- Radu Mărginean (born 1983), Romanian footballer
