= Voiculeț =

Voiculeț is a Romanian surname. Notable people with the surname include:

- Adrian Voiculeț (born 1985), Romanian footballer
- Claudiu Voiculeț (born 1985), Romanian footballer
