= Stadionul Motorul =

Stadionul Motorul may refer to two Romanian stadiums.

- Stadionul Motorul (Arad)
- Stadionul Motorul (Oradea)
