= Pantea =

Pantea or Pântea is a Persian female given name and Romanian surname. Notable people with the name include:

== Given name ==
- Panthea of Susa, Character in the Cyropaedia
- Pantea Bahram, Iranian actress
- Pantea Panahiha, Iranian actress
- Pantea Rahmani, Iranian artist
- Pantea Beigi, Iranian-American human rights advocate

== Surname ==
- Alexandru Pantea (born 2003), Romanian footballer
- Aurel Pantea (born 1952), Romanian poet
- Gherman Pântea (1894–1968), Bessarabian soldier
- Nicolae Pantea (born 1946), Romanian footballer
