= Ioan Almășan =

Romanian footballer

Personal information
- Date of birth: 22 June 1962 (age 64)
- Place of birth: Lovrin, Romania
- Height: 1.80 m (5 ft 11 in)
- Position: Goalkeeper

Youth career
- 1979–1980: Unirea Tomnatic

Senior career*
Years	Team	Apps	(Gls)
1979–1980	Unirea Tomnatic		
1980–1981	Voința Lovrin		
1981–1985	Unirea Sânnicolau Mare		
1985	Politehnica Timișoara	4	(0)
1986–1987	Unirea Sânnicolau Mare		
1987–1997	Politehnica Timișoara (Note: The statistics for the 1988–89 Divizia B season are unavailable.)	198	(0)
1998	Sporting Tabac		
1998–2002	UM Timișoara (Note: The statistics for the 1998–99 Divizia C season are unavailable.)	68	(0)
Total		270	(0)

International career
1992	Romania B	1	(0)

Managerial career
- 2006: Unirea Sânnicolau Mare
- 2006–2010: Unirea Sânnicolau Mare (assistant)
- * Club domestic league appearances and goals

Ioan Almășan (born 22 June 1962) is a Romanian former football goalkeeper and manager.

== Club career ==
Almășan was born on 22 June 1962 in Lovrin, Romania and practiced handball during his school years. He began playing football in 1979 at the age of 17 at Divizia C club Unirea Tomnatic, where he simultaneously played for the club's senior and junior teams. In 1980, he moved to Voința Lovrin in the fifth league before joining third-tier club Unirea Sânnicolau Mare one year later. Shortly afterward, an 18-month stint of mandatory military service interrupted his career. In 1983, he began playing for Unirea in Divizia C, where he was teammates with Dan Păltinișanu.

Almășan went to play for Politehnica Timișoara in 1985, making his Divizia A debut on 22 September under coach Robert Cosmoc in a 2–2 draw against Sportul Studențesc București. Midway through the 1985–86 season, he returned to Unirea Sânnicolau Mare in Divizia C. In 1987, he made a comeback to Politehnica in Divizia A, managing to save a penalty executed by Dorin Mateuț in a 2–1 win over Dinamo București. However, the team suffered relegation at the end of the 1987–88 season, but he stayed with the club, helping them gain promotion back to the first league after one year. Politehnica reached the 1992 Cupa României final, where Almășan played the entire match under coach Ion Ionescu in the loss to Steaua București. The club experienced another relegation at the end of the 1993–94 season. Almășan stayed on to help engineer an immediate promotion back to the first division, but the cycle repeated when they dropped down again in 1996–97.

In 1997, Almășan left Politehnica and went to the United States, where he played both minifootball and regular football. He returned to Romania in 1998, joining fourth-tier club Sporting Tabac. In the summer of 1998, he moved to UM Timișoara, helping them gain promotion from the third league to the second and then from the second to the first. During the 2001–02 Divizia A season, at the end of which UM suffered relegation, Almășan made his last appearances in the Romanian top-league, totaling 187 matches in the competition.

== International career ==
Almășan played one match for Romania B on 25 August 1992, when he replaced Florin Prunea in the 87th minute in a 1–0 loss to Poland.

== Managerial career ==
In 2006, Almășan had a stint as head coach at Unirea Sânnicolau Mare. Subsequently, he worked for the club as an assistant coach for several years.

== Honours ==
Politehnica Timișoara

- Divizia B: 1988–89, 1994–95
- Cupa României runner-up: 1991–92

UM Timișoara

- Divizia B: 2000–01
- Divizia C: 1998–99
