= Andrei Bozeșan =

Romanian footballer

Personal information
- Full name: Andrei Dan Bozeșan
- Date of birth: 12 February 1988 (age 38)
- Place of birth: Bistrița, Romania
- Height: 1.80 m (5 ft 11 in)
- Position: Midfielder

Youth career
- Gloria Bistrița

Senior career*
Years	Team	Apps	(Gls)
2005–2009	Gloria Bistrița	3	(0)
2005	→ Gloria II Bistrița	5	(0)
2006	→ Gloria II Bistrița		
2007	→ Forex Brașov (loan)	14	(0)
2009–2014	Gaz Metan Mediaș	37	(0)
2012–2013	→ Săgeata Năvodari (loan)	6	(0)
Total		65	(0)
- * Club domestic league appearances and goals as of 30 December 2018

Andrei Dan Bozeșan (born 12 February 1988) is a Romanian former footballer who played as a midfielder for teams such as: Gloria Bistrița, Forex Brașov, Gaz Metan Mediaș and Săgeata Năvodari.
