= Stadionul Electromagnetica =

Romanian stadium

- Interactive map of Stadionul Electromagnetica
- Address: Str. Veseliei, nr. 19
- Location: Bucharest, Romania
- Coordinates: 44°24′21.68″N 26°5′7.01″E
- Owner: Municipality of Sector 5
- Operator: Asalt București; ACS Rapid FNG
- Capacity: 2,000 (0 seated)
- Surface: Grass

Construction
- Opened: 1 May 1939

Tenants
- Rapid II București (1946–2012); AFC Rapid (2016–2017); Asalt București (2017–present); CSO Bragadiru (2018); ACS Rapid FNG (2019–present)

Stadionul Electromagnetica is a multi-purpose stadium in Bucharest, Romania. It is currently used mostly for football matches and is the home ground of Asalt București and ACS Rapid FNG. The stadium holds 2,000 people and was opened in the interwar period, being the only stadium opened in Bucharest in that period that is still in use. For 66 years the stadium was the homeground of Rapid II București, team that was known in the past as Electromagnetica București. The scoreboard is an unusual one, being the old scoreboard from the Stadionul Republicii, moved here when the stadium was demolished.
