= Jurica Siljanoski =

Macedonian footballer (born 1973)

Personal information
- Date of birth: 30 December 1973 (age 52)
- Place of birth: Ohrid, Yugoslavia
- Height: 1.80 m (5 ft 11 in)
- Position: Forward

Senior career*
Years	Team	Apps	(Gls)
1991–1992	Ohrid		
1992–1993	AZ	0	(0)
1993–1994	Ohrid		
1994–1995	Bayern Munich (A)		
1995–1996	Vardar		
1996–1997	ADO Den Haag	5	(2)
1997–1998	Maribor	15	(3)
1998–1999	Westerlo	6	(1)
1999–2000	Kortrijk	28	(11)
2000–2001	Cercle Brugge	22	(6)
2001–2003	Elfsborg	35	(3)
2003–2005	FC Oradea	33	(14)
2005–2006	Fawkner-Whittlesea	22	(2)
2007	Altona Magic	6	(0)
2007	Altona East Phoenix	12	(7)
2008	Brunswick City SC	3	(0)
2010	Altona Magic	7	(1)
2010	Sydenham Park		

International career
2001–2002	Macedonia	5	(1)
- * Club domestic league appearances and goals

Jurica 'Juri' Siljanoski (born 30 December 1973) is a Macedonian former professional footballer who played as a forward.

== Club career ==
Siljanoski was born in Yugoslavia. After five years of no games at clubs like FK Ohrid, Bayern Munich, AZ Alkmaar and Vardar Skopje, he transferred to ADO Den Haag in the Dutch Eerste Divisie. He moved to Slovenia and then Belgium for three different teams over three years to gain more match time.

From 2001 to 2003, he played three years at Elfsborg in Sweden playing and scoring in the UEFA Champions League qualifying rounds. He then moved to Romania to play in the first division for two years.

He married an Australian woman and moved to Australia where he first trialled for A-League club Queensland Roar. He then joined Fawkner Blues in the Victorian Premier League followed by Altona Magic. After being released from Altona Magic, he joined next door neighbouring club Altona East Phoenix where he played the remainder of season 2007 in Victorian State Division 2 N/W. He then joined Phoenix rivals Brunswick City in the same division in 2008.

== International career ==
He made his senior debut for Macedonia in a November 2001 friendly match against Hungary and has earned a total of five caps, scoring one goal. His final international was a January 2002 friendly against Finland.

== Honours ==
Maribor

- Slovenian First League: 1997–98

Elfsborg

- Svenska Cupen: 2001, 2003
