= Marius Mârne =

Romanian footballer

Personal information
- Full name: Marius Ioan Mârne
- Date of birth: 8 February 1977 (age 49)
- Place of birth: Arad, Romania
- Height: 1.90 m (6 ft 3 in)
- Position: Goalkeeper

Senior career*
| Years | Team | Apps | (Gls) |
| 1997 | CPL Arad | ? | (?) |
| 1997–2000 | Universitatea Cluj | 27 | (0) |
| 2000–2001 | UTA Arad | 14 | (0) |
| 2002–2003 | Bihor Oradea | 6 | (0) |
| 2003–2007 | UTA Arad | 51 | (0) |
| Total | | 98 | (0) |
- * Club domestic league appearances and goals as of 14 April 2018

Marius Ioan Mârne (born 8 February 1977 in Arad) is a Romanian former football player.
