= Bogdan Vrăjitoarea =

Romanian footballer

Personal information
- Full name: Bogdan Mihăiţă Vrăjitoarea
- Date of birth: 7 February 1978 (age 48)
- Place of birth: Craiova, Romania
- Height: 1.80 m (5 ft 11 in)
- Position: Striker

Team information
- Current team: Universitatea Craiova (youth)

Youth career
- –1996: Universitatea Craiova

Senior career*
Years	Team	Apps	(Gls)
1996–1997	FC Universitatea Craiova	19	(2)
1997	→ Rocar București (loan)	15	(4)
1998	Dinamo București	5	(2)
1998–2001	Rocar București	76	(26)
1999	→ Astra Ploieşti (loan)	1	(0)
2001–2002	FC Universitatea Craiova	11	(1)
2001	→ Gloria Bistriţa (loan)	5	(0)
2002–2004	FC Oradea	42	(22)
2004–2005	Argeș Pitești	10	(1)
2005	Politehnica Iaşi	12	(1)
2006	Unirea Urziceni	6	(0)
2006	Jiul Petroşani	12	(2)
2007	Ceahlăul Piatra Neamţ	13	(2)
2007–2008	Dacia Mioveni	11	(1)
2008	Liberty Salonta	11	(10)
2009	CS Buftea	14	(3)
2009–2010	Progresul Corabia	23	(7)
2010–2012	Voința Saelele		
Total		286	(84)

Managerial career
- 2009–2010: Progresul Corabia (player/coach)
- 2013–2014: CS Podari
- 2015–: CS Universitatea Craiova (youth)
- 2016: CS Universitatea II Craiova
- 2021–2022: CS Universitatea II Craiova (assistant)
- 2023: CS Universitatea Craiova (assistant)
- * Club domestic league appearances and goals

Bogdan Mihăiţă Vrăjitoarea (born 7 February 1978) is a Romanian former footballer.

== Honours ==
Rocar București

- Cupa României runner-up: 2000–01
