= Valentin Miculescu =

Romanian professional footballer

Personal information
- Date of birth: 4 September 1975 (age 51)
- Place of birth: Timișoara, Romania
- Height: 1.88 m (6 ft 2 in)
- Position: Striker

Senior career*
Years	Team	Apps	(Gls)
1995–1996	Electrica Timișoara	?	(?)
1996–1997	UM Timișoara	43	(31)
1997–2000	Politehnica Timișoara	63	(12)
2001–2002	UTA Arad	30	(15)
2002–2005	Békéscsaba Előre	63	(15)
2005	UTA Arad	10	(2)
2005–2006	Bihor Oradea	19	(9)
2007–2008	Unirea Sânnicolau Mare	30	(11)
2008	Progresul Gătaia	13	(9)
2009	Fortuna Covaci	13	(9)
Total		284	(113)
- * Club domestic league appearances and goals

Valentin Miculescu (born 4 September 1975) is a Romanian former footballer who last played for Liga II club FCM Reșița.

== Club career ==
Miculescu had a spell in Hungary where he played for Békéscsaba Előre.

== Personal life ==
Valentin's son, David Miculescu, is also a footballer.
