= FC Rapid II București =

Association football club in Bucharest, Romania

Rapid II București
- Full name: Fotbal Club Rapid 1923 II
- Nickname(s): Micii Rapidiști; Alb-vișiniii (The White-Burgundies); Vulturașii vișinii (The Burgundy Little Eagles); Micii Feroviarii (The Little Railwaymen)
- Short name: Rapid II
- Founded: 1946 as Vestitorul București; 2019 as Rapid 1923 II
- Dissolved: 2022
- Ground: Electromagnetica / Regie
- Capacity: 2,000 / 10,020
- 2021–22: Liga III, Seria IV, 3rd (withdrew)
- Website: fcrapid.ro
Home colours	Away colours

Fotbal Club Rapid 1923 II, commonly known as Rapid II București (Romanian pronunciation: [raˈpid bukuˈreʃtʲ]), or simply as Rapid II, was the reserve squad of Romanian top-flight side, FC Rapid București. Rapid II was based, as the first squad, in Bucharest.

Rapid II was originally founded in 1946, as Vestitorul București, then was renamed as Electromagnetica București and finally as Rapid II București, after FC Rapid București bought Electromagnetica in the early 2000s. The best performance of "the Little Railwaymen" was a 3rd place at the end of the 2001–02 Divizia B season.

== History ==
=== Vestitorul & Electromagnetica (1946–2001) ===
FC Rapid II București was founded right after the end of the World War II, in 1946, as Vestitorul București. Vestitorul played for years at the level of Bucharest Municipality (Divizia D), before being bought by Electromagnetica, the main manufacturer of telecommunications equipment in Romania. Vestitorul București was renamed as Electromagnetica București in the 1960s, but important achievements did not appear in the following years, and Electromagnetica remained a fourth tier squad.

After the 1989 Romanian Revolution and fall of communism in the country, the factory was privatized and for the football team started its most glorious time. The club based in Veseliei Street promoted in the Divizia C, for the first time in its history, at the end of the 1994–95 season, after crowning as champions of Bucharest. At the end of the first season Electromagnetica was ranked 15th of 20, achieving its goal, the avoidance of relegation.

In the next seasons, Electromagnetica was a constant presence in the top of its Divizia C series, being ranked 3rd for three times in a row (1996–97, 1997–98, 1998–99) and as runner-up at the end of the 1999–2000 season, before winning its series and promoting in the Divizia B, at the end of the 2000–01 season. The club from Bucharest won the fourth series with an advance of only one point in front of former Divizia A side Flacăra Moreni.

=== Rapid II (2001–present) ===
After promotion, Electromagnetica started a collaboration with Divizia A side Rapid București, becoming its "satellite". From the perspective of Rapid, this new collaboration gave them the chance of having a second senior squad at the level of second division, where the players who finished the youth academy could be accommodated with the intensity of seniors level of football. On the other hand, for Electromagnetica was a mouth of oxygen, both from a financial point of view, as well as the transfers.

In its first season, Rapid-Electromagnetica collaboration was a fruitful one, the team being ranked 3rd, best performance in its entire history. In the next seasons the club was ranked: 6th (2002–03) and 13th (2003–04).

In the summer of 2004, Electromagnetica București has come under the sole control of FC Rapid București and was renamed as Rapid II București, but continuing to play its home matches in Vesliei Street, on Electromagnetica Stadium. At the end of the 2004–05 season, Rapid II was ranked 6th of 16, then, next season, relegating after being ranked 13th of 16, three positions under the red line.

However, during the 2005–06 season, Rapid II achieved one of the greatest performance in the club's history by eliminating Steaua București, in the Round of 32 of the Romanian Cup, with 8–7 at penalties, after the score was 0–0 during regular time and extra time.

Rapid II continued to play at the level of Liga III, but the 2008 financial crisis and the problems of the parent club, FC Rapid București, made the team to struggle in mediocrity, finally withdrawing from the championship during the winter break of the 2012–13 season.

In the summer of 2019, after the promotion of Rapid in the Liga II, it was decided the re-foundation of Rapid II, the squad being enrolled in the Liga IV – Bucharest. Marian Rada was named the new manager of the "Burgundy Little Eagles".

== Grounds ==
Electromagnetica București used to play its home matches on Electromagnetica Stadium. The stadium holds 5,000 people and was opened in the interwar period, being the only stadium opened in Bucharest in that period that is still in use. The scoreboard is an unusual one, being the old scoreboard from the Stadionul Republicii, moved here when the stadium was demolished.

Rapid II continued to play on Electromagnetica Stadium until its relegation to Liga III. After relegation, the second squad of Rapid used various home ground, since July 2019 the stadium used as home ground being Coresi Stadium, with a capacity of 100 people.

== Honours ==
Liga II

- Winners (1): 1958–59 as TAROM București

Liga III

- Winners (1): 2000–01
- Runners-up (1): 1999–2000

Liga IV – Bucharest

- Winners (1): 1994–95
- Runners-up (1): 2019–20

== League history ==
Season	Tier	Division	Place	Cupa României
2021–22	3	Liga III (Seria IV)	3rd (R)	

Season	Tier	Division	Place	Cupa României
2020–21	3	Liga III (Seria IV)	8th	

== Notable players ==
- Hristu Chiacu
- Nicolae Grigore

== Former managers ==
- (Romania) Ion Lupaș (1952–1953)
- (Romania) Marius Șumudică (2005–2006)
