= Alin Zaha =

Romanian footballer

Personal information
- Date of birth: 29 September 1977 (age 49)
- Place of birth: Arad, Romania
- Height: 1.89 m (6 ft 2 in)
- Position: Defender

Youth career
- UTA Arad

Senior career*
Years	Team	Apps	(Gls)
1997–2002	UTA Arad	114	(0)
2003–2004	FC Oradea	16	(0)
2004–2007	Liberty Salonta	21	(0)
2007–2009	Național Sebiș		
2009–2011	CFR Simeria		
- * Club domestic league appearances and goals

Alin Zaha (born 29 September 1977) is a Romanian former professional footballer who played as a defender.
