= Claudiu Ionescu (footballer, born 1984) =

Romanian footballer

Personal information
- Full name: Claudiu Mihai Ionescu
- Date of birth: 18 August 1984 (age 42)
- Place of birth: Slatina, Romania
- Height: 1.75 m (5 ft 9 in)
- Position: Striker

Youth career
- Argeș Pitești

Senior career*
Years	Team	Apps	(Gls)
2003–2004	ARO Câmpulung	25	(0)
2004–2009	Dacia Mioveni	101	(23)
2009–2010	Internațional	4	(0)
2010–2012	Mioveni	52	(13)
2012–2013	Politehnica Iași	33	(1)
2014	Olt Slatina	10	(1)
2014–2015	Metalul Reșița	18	(2)
2016	Muscelul Câmpulung	7	(1)
Total		250	(41)
- * Club domestic league appearances and goals as of 3 March 2016

Claudiu Ionescu (born 18 August 1984) is a Romanian former footballer who played as a striker for teams such as ARO Câmpulung, Dacia Mioveni or Politehnica Iași, among others.

== Club career ==
=== CS Mioveni ===
Ionescu spent most of his career at CS Mioveni, making his debut in 2004 in Liga II. He played his first Liga I game on 2 September 2007, against Universitatea Cluj.

=== Politehnica Iaşi ===
In the middle of 2012, Ionescu joined newly promoted Politehnica Iaşi. He scored on his debut match against Oțelul Galați in a 1–2 defeat.
