= Aurel Pantea =

Romanian poet and literary critic (born 1952)

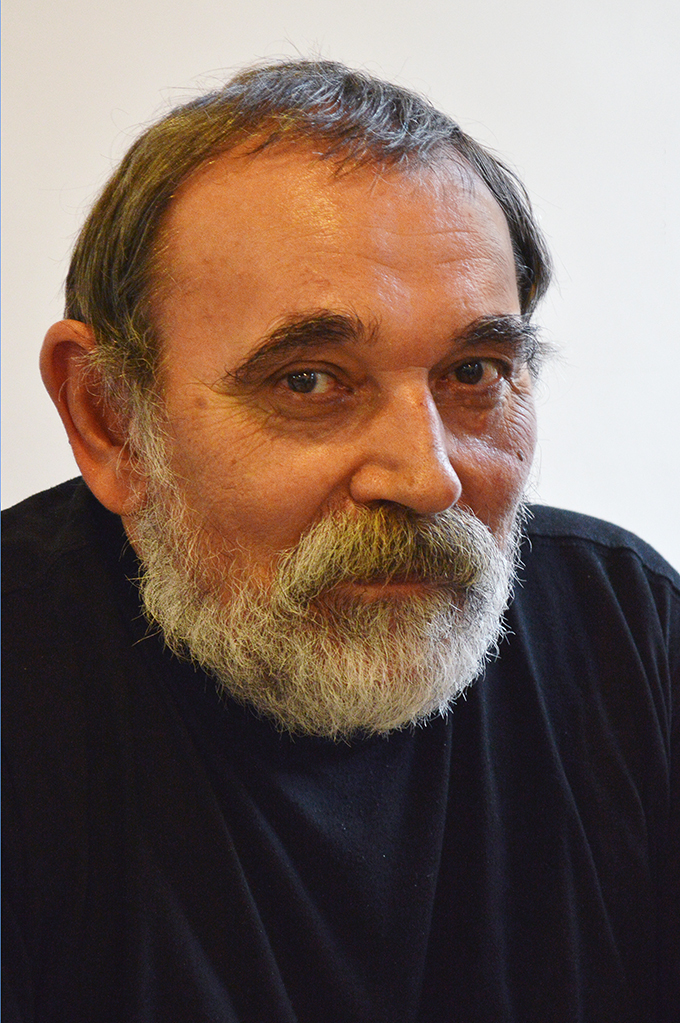
- Aurel Pantea (2013)
- Born: 10 March 1952 (age 74); Chețani, Mureș County
- Education: Babeș-Bolyai University
- Occupation: Author

Aurel Pantea (Romanian pronunciation: [a.uˈrel ˈpante̯a]; born 10 March 1952) is a Romanian poet and literary critic.

Born in Chețani, Mureș County into a family of peasants, Pantea attended the Faculty of Letters of the Babeș-Bolyai University in Cluj, graduating in 1976. During the university years he collaborated with the magazine Equinox. After graduation, he taught at Borșa and Alba Iulia. Since 1989 he is the director of the magazine Vatra, and since 1990 he is the director of the magazine Discobolul. He is a member of the Writers' Union of Romania.

== Body of works ==
Poetry

- Casa cu retori, București, Editura Albatros, 1980.
- Persoana de după-amiază, Cluj, Editura Dacia, 1983.
- La persoana a treia, București, Editura Cartea Românească, 1992.
- Negru pe negru, Tg. Mureș, Editura Arhipelag, 1993.
- Aceste veneții, aceste lagune, Bacău, Editura Axa, 1995.
- O victorie covârșitoare, Pitești, Editura Paralela 45, 1996.
- Negru pe negru (alt poem), Cluj, Editura Casa Cărții de Știință, 2005.

Literary critic

- Poeți ai transcendenței pline, Cluj, Editura Casa Cărții de Știință, 2003.
- Simpatii critice, Cluj, Editura Casa Cărții de Știință, 2004.
- Înapoi la lirism (o anchetă), Tg. Mureș, Editura Ardealul, 2005.
- Ștefan Aug. Doinaș (studiu monografic), Cluj, Editura Limes, 2007.
- Sacrul în poezia românească (volum colectiv), Cluj, Editura Casa Cărții de Știință, 2007.
