= Tiberiu Șerban =

Romanian footballer

Personal information
- Full name: Tiberiu Gabriel Șerban
- Date of birth: 24 October 1977 (age 49)
- Place of birth: Piatra Neamț, Romania
- Height: 1.80 m (5 ft 11 in)
- Positions: Attacking midfielder; central midfielder

Senior career*
| Years | Team | Apps | (Gls) |
| 1995–2004 | Ceahlăul Piatra Neamț | 150 | (17) |
| 2004–2005 | Liberty Salonta | 17 | (1) |
| 2005–2006 | Ceahlăul Piatra Neamț | 38 | (18) |
| 2007 | Petrolul Ploiești | 3 | (0) |
| 2007–2008 | Juventus București | | |
| 2008–2009 | Pambac Bacău | 3 | (0) |
| 2009–2010 | Viitorul Domnești | | |
| Total | | 211 | (36) |
- * Club domestic league appearances and goals

Tiberiu Gabriel Șerban (born 24 October 1977) is a Romanian former footballer who played as a midfielder.

== Conviction ==
After ending his playing career in 2010, Șerban suffered from alcoholism and epilepsy, having divorced his wife. In 2017 he was sentenced to one year and three months in prison after threatening his girlfriend with a knife in a bar, he was released from prison after a few months.

== Honours ==
Ceahlăul Piatra Neamț

- Divizia B: 2005–06
