= Florin Sabou =

Romanian footballer

Personal information
- Full name: Florin Cosmin Sabou
- Date of birth: 16 January 1980 (age 46)
- Place of birth: Zalău, Romania
- Height: 1.74 m (5 ft 8 1/2 in)
- Position: Midfielder

Senior career*
| Years | Team | Apps | (Gls) |
| 2002–2003 | Armătura Zalău | 0 | (0) |
| 2005–2006 | Bihor Oradea | 4 | (0) |
| 2006–2007 | Liberty Salonta | 13 | (3) |
| 2007–2010 | Gaz Metan Mediaş | 40 | (4) |
| 2010–2011 | Unirea Alba Iulia | 13 | (0) |
| 2011–2014 | FC Zalău | ? | (?) |
| 2014–2015 | Arieșul Turda | ? | (?) |
| Total | | 70+ | (7+) |
- * Club domestic league appearances and goals as of 15 November 2017

Florin Cosmin Sabou (born 16 January 1980) is a Romanian former footballer who played as a midfielder.
