= Cristian Silvășan =

Romanian association football player

Personal information
- Full name: Cristian Radu Silvășan
- Date of birth: 25 February 1982 (age 44)
- Place of birth: Câmpia Turzii, Romania
- Height: 1.82 m (5 ft 11 1/2 in)
- Position: Striker

Senior career*
Years	Team	Apps	(Gls)
2000–2001	Fulgerul Bragadiru	2	(0)
2001	Electroputere Craiova	13	(1)
2001–2002	Rocar București	11	(2)
2002	FC U Craiova	5	(0)
2002–2006	Politehnica Timişoara	86	(17)
2006–2007	Politehnica Iaşi	25	(2)
2007–2008	Universitatea Cluj	9	(3)
2008–2009	Gloria Bistrița	19	(3)
2009–2011	Gaz Metan Mediaș	30	(3)
2011–2012	Gloria Bistrița	15	(6)
2012–2013	UTA Arad	12	(4)
2013–2014	Farul Constanţa	16	(3)
Total		243	(44)
- * Club domestic league appearances and goals as of 15 February 2016

Cristian Radu Silvășan (born 25 February 1982) is a Romanian former football player. He played as striker, but he could also be used as a right midfielder.

== Career ==
At the beginning of his career, Silvășan swapped twice between Bucharest and Craiova (Fulgerul Bragadiru – Electroputere Craiova – Rocar București – Universitatea Craiova), before moving to FCU Politehnica Timişoara. He showed a lot of promise in the first two seasons at Poli, despite scoring only 13 goals in 56 matches. However, he did not really rise up to the expectations of the public, thus, he ended up spending more time on the bench than on the field. In the winter of 2007 he was released from the club and joined Politehnica Iaşi. In 2007 Silvășan was transferred to U Cluj, in August 2008 moved to Gloria Bistrita.
