= Alin Artimon =

Romanian footballer and manager

Personal information
- Full name: Alin Dănuț Artimon
- Date of birth: 31 August 1971 (age 55)
- Place of birth: Timișoara, Romania
- Position: Centre back

Senior career*
Years	Team	Apps	(Gls)
1989–1991	Steaua București	26	(0)
1991–1992	Gloria Bistrița	1	(0)
1992–1993	Politehnica Timișoara	1	(0)
1993–1994	UM Timișoara	-	(-)
1994–1996	CFR Timișoara	59	(1)
1996–1997	Politehnica Timișoara	19	(0)
1997–1999	FC Onești	42	(2)
1999	CFR Timișoara	-	(-)
1999–2000	Drobeta-Turnu Severin	6	(0)
Total		154	(3)

Managerial career
- 2004–2005: Apulum Unirea Alba Iulia
- 2005: Bihor Oradea
- 2006–2007: Politehnica Timișoara
- 2007: CFR Timișoara
- 2008: Forex Brașov
- 2008–2010: CSM Râmnicu Vâlcea
- 2010: Juventus București
- 2012–2013: Farul Constanța
- 2013–2015: FC Caransebeș
- * Club domestic league appearances and goals

Alin Artimon (born 31 August 1971 in Timișoara, Romania) is a former Romanian football player and current manager.

== History ==
Artimon started his career at CSȘ Timișoara and played for the senior team of Politehnica Timișoara before joining Steaua București. He was labeled the next Miodrag Belodedici, but he was plagued by injuries and never really managed to progress. His subsequent career saw him play for Timișoara based teams, such as CFR and Poli, before moving on to FC Onești and ending his career at Drobeta-Turnu Severin.

He started his manager career at the Divizia C team Telecom Timișoara. In 2004, he became the assistant of Gheorghe Mulțescu at Politehnica Timișoara and later on, in autumn 2004, the team's head coach. He continued his career as assistant and afterwards as head coach of Apulum Alba Iulia in Divizia A. After a short stint as manager at Bihor Oradea in Divizia B in 2005, Artimon was recruited in summer 2006 at Poli as a youth-supervisor. He received his big opportunity when being offered the manager position at the club after Sorin Cîrţu's release on 23 October 2006. While initially viewed only as a temporary solution, a good streak of results meant that he would be given the chance to lead the team for the remainder of the season.

However, on 5 March 2007, Artimon resigned from his position as manager, stating that he did not wish to continue to work for the club if his efforts remain unappreciated. The resignation came just two days after a draw against Dinamo București, when Poli used the second team in protest against a two-match ban received by Artavazd Karamyan.

On 26 March 2007 he became the manager of the Divizia B team CFR Timișoara. On 2 July 2008 was named as the new head coach of Forex Brașov, but was sacked in September after six rounds.

In September 2008 he replaced Nikola Ilievski as manager at CSM Râmnicu Vâlcea. On 30 July 2010, Artimon followed Eusebiu Tudor as manager at Juventus București.
