= Cristian Constantin =

Romanian footballer

Personal information
- Date of birth: 14 March 1978 (age 48)
- Place of birth: Târgoviște, Romania
- Height: 1.77 m (5 ft 10 in)
- Position: Left midfielder

Senior career*
Years	Team	Apps	(Gls)
1997–1998	Metalul Plopeni	2	(0)
1998–1999	Chindia Târgoviște	9	(0)
1998–1999	Rocar București	12	(0)
1999–2000	Dinamo București	1	(0)
2000–2003	ARO Câmpulung	71	(13)
2004–2008	Unirea Urziceni	104	(14)
2008–2009	Otopeni	27	(2)
2009–2010	Politehnica Iași	24	(1)
2010–2011	Alro Slatina	7	(0)
2011	Botoșani	0	(0)
2011	Gloria Bistrița	5	(0)
2012–2015	Ștefănești		
Total		262+	(30)
- * Club domestic league appearances and goals as of 24 April 2020

Cristian Constantin (born 14 March 1978) is a Romanian former footballer who played as a left midfielder for teams such as Rocar București, ARO Câmpulung, Unirea Urziceni, CS Otopeni or Politehnica Iași, among others.

== Honours ==
Dinamo București

- Divizia A: Winner (1) 1999–2000
