= Adrian Gongolea =

Romanian footballer

Personal information
- Full name: Adrian Ioan Gongolea
- Date of birth: 20 August 1975 (age 51)
- Place of birth: Ocna Mureș, Romania
- Height: 1.83 m (6 ft 0 in)
- Position: Defender

Youth career
- Bihor Oradea

Senior career*
Years	Team	Apps	(Gls)
1993–1995	Bihor Oradea	37	(1)
1996	Brașov	7	(0)
1997	Rapid București	0	(0)
1997–1998	Olimpia Satu Mare	33	(2)
1999	Bihor Oradea	18	(1)
2000	Borussia Fulda	18	(1)
2000–2002	Augsburg	53	(4)
2002–2003	Bonner SC	18	(0)
2003–2004	Armătura Zalău	21	(1)
2004–2005	Bihor Oradea	12	(2)
2006	Olimpia Satu Mare	12	(1)
2006	Nyíregyháza Spartacus	7	(1)
2007–2008	Bihor Oradea	35	(3)
2008–2010	Târgu Mureș	50	(2)
2010–2011	Mureșul Deva	10	(0)
Total		331	(19)

Managerial career
- 2012–2013: Liberty Salonta (youth)
- 2013–2014: Bihor Oradea (youth)
- 2021–: CSM Oradea (youth)
- * Club domestic league appearances and goals as of 07:23, 18 August 2021 (UTC)

Adrian Ioan Gongolea (born 20 August 1975) is a Romanian former professional footballer who played as a midfielder.
