= Dorel Zaharia =

Romanian footballer

Personal information
- Date of birth: 21 February 1978 (age 48)
- Place of birth: Constanța, Romania
- Height: 1.90 m (6 ft 3 in)
- Position: Forward

Team information
- Current team: Farul Constanța Women (technical director)

Senior career*
Years	Team	Apps	(Gls)
1998–2001	Callatis Mangalia	50	(9)
1999	→ Farul Constanța (loan)	2	(0)
1999–2000	→ Portul Constanța (loan)		(?)
2001–2002	Midia Năvodari	24	(5)
2002	CSM Reșița	13	(1)
2003–2005	Gaz Metan Mediaș	53	(8)
2005–2006	Unirea Urziceni	29	(14)
2006–2007	Gloria Bistrița	31	(11)
2007	Steaua București	14	(1)
2008	UTA Arad	10	(0)
2008–2010	FC Brașov	41	(5)
2009	→ Gloria Bistrița (loan)	13	(3)
2010	Levadiakos	13	(1)
2011	FCM Târgu Mureș	12	(0)
2011–2013	Săgeata Năvodari	47	(21)
2013–2015	Granitul Babadag		
2016–2017	Farul Constanța		
2018	Farul Constanța	1	(0)
Total		353	(79)

Managerial career
- 2019–2024: Farul Constanța (head of youth development)
- 2024–: FCV Farul Constanța (women) (technical director)
- * Club domestic league appearances and goals

Dorel Zaharia (born 21 February 1978) is a Romanian former professional footballer, who played as a forward, currently technical director at Liga I women's club FCV Farul Constanța.

He was Gloria Bistriţa's top scorer in the 2006–07 season with 11 goals, and the Intertoto Cup he scored a goal against Atlético Madrid, Gloria winning with 2–1. He scored another goal, but this time in a 2–1 loss at the Emirates Stadium against Arsenal in his Steaua's time.

== Honours ==
Granitul Babadag

- Liga IV – Constanța County: 2013–14

Farul Constanța

- Liga III: 2017–18
- Liga IV – Constanța County: 2016–17
