= Bogdan Cistean =

Romanian footballer

Personal information
- Full name: Bogdan Iosif Cistean
- Date of birth: 29 December 1986 (age 39)
- Place of birth: Blaj, Romania
- Height: 1.82 m (6 ft 0 in)
- Position: Left-back

Senior career*
Years	Team	Apps	(Gls)
2004–2005	Bihor Oradea	1	(1)
2006	Sportul Studenţesc	10	(0)
2006–2007	Bihor Oradea	10	(0)
2007–2008	Progresul București	1	(0)
2008–2009	Steaua II București	3	(0)
Total		25	(1)
- * Club domestic league appearances and goals as of 14 April 2018

Bogdan Iosif Cistean (born 29 December 1986) is a Romanian former football player and current Norfolk based football coach.
