= CS Unirea Sânnicolau Mare =

Romanian football club

Unirea Sânnicolau Mare
- Full name: Clubul Sportiv; Unirea Sânnicolau Mare
- Nicknames: Uniriștii; Alb-Albaștrii (The White and Blues); Trupa de pe Aranca (The Band on the Aranca River)
- Founded: 1957; 69 years ago 2008; 18 years ago (refounded)
- Ground: Gheorghe Biaș
- Capacity: 3,000
- Owner: Sânnicolau Mare Town
- Chairman: Flavius Sitaru
- Manager: Cristian Contescu
- League: Liga IV
- 2025–26: Liga IV, Timiș County, 4th of 16
- Website: http://www.unireasannicolaumare.ro/
Home colours	Away colours

Clubul Sportiv Unirea Sânnicolau Mare, commonly known as Unirea Sânnicolau Mare, or simply as Sânnicolau Mare, is a Romanian amateur football club based in Sânnicolau Mare, Timiș County and currently playing in the Liga IV – Timiș County, the third tier of the Romanian football league system.

== History ==
In the westernmost city of Romania, Sânnicolau Mare, football first dressed white-blue clothing in 1957. It was the moment when the leaders of two local teams – Recolta Sânnicolau Mare, which was considered the peasant's team, and the simple ones, respectively Progresul Sânnicolau Mare, which included the people in the "intellectual space" of the city on Aranca- were on the same wavelength and decided that only one football club was needed, and the name chosen was more than suggestively: Unirea.

Unirea played for sixteen years at the regional and county level. In the 1972–73 season, "The Band on the Aranca River" managed to win the Timiș County Championship and was promoted for the first time in Divizia C.

Followed nineteen consecutive seasons in the Third Division, in which Unirea was ranked as follows: 6th (1973–74), 7th (1974–75), 8th (1975–76), 8th (1976–77), 6th (1977–78), as runners-up in 1978–79, losing the promotion at goal difference in front of Unirea Alba Iulia, 11th (1979–80), 9th (1980–81), 9th (1981–82), 8th (1982–83), 7th (1983–84), 5th (1984–85), 14th (1985–86), 7th (1986–87), 7th (1987–88), 12th (1988–89), 4th (1989–90), 10th (1990–91) and 14th in 1991–92, relegating to the County Championship due to the reorganization of the competitive system in the summer of 1992.

At the end of the 2002–03 season, Unirea finished 12th in the Fourth Division. However, the local authorities decided to bought the place of Mureșul Deva in Divizia C. After one season spent in Third Division, with Daniel Mănăilă as head coach, Unirea Sânnicolau Mare finished first in the Series VII and promoted to Second Division for the first time in history. The squad included following players: Adrian Boldor, Toma Stoianov, Marius Stanache, Adrian Grijincu, Doru Siminiceanu, Răzvan Mitric, Cristian Uftineanț, Mihăiță Hromei, Petre Bălăban, Valentin Grigore, Marius Postolache, Andrei Rați, Safar, Tărnăuceanu, Nicolae Bota, Ion Feneș, Bran, Constantinescu.

After promotion to Divizia B, were brought experienced players such as Dan Stupar, Florin Macavei, Vasile Ciocoi, Nelu Mitrică, Marcel Băban or Ferid Colakovic, ending the 2004–05 season in tenth place in Series III.

Unirea started the 2005–06 season with Ciprian Urican as head coach, but in April 2006, due to the poor results, was replaced with Ioan Almășan, who was unable to save the club from relegation finishing fifteenth.

Following relegation to the Third Division, Ioan Petcu was appointed as the new head coach, leading the club to fifth place at the end of the 2006–07 season and promoted to Second Division after winning Series V of Liga III in the 2007–08 season. But in the summer of 2008, Unirea Sânnicolau Mare sold its place in Liga II to FCM Târgu Mureș and continued to play in Liga III the following season.

Dan Stupar took over as head coach for the 2008–09 season, leading the club, without many players among those who succeeded in promotion, to a disappointing fifteenth place.

The 2009–10 season started with Nicolae Căprărescu as head coach, but who left the club after thirteen rounds, Unirea being in the relegation zone on 14th place with 10 points, and was replaced with Petre Vlătănescu, the former coach of Alto Gradimento Albina in the last season. In the end, "The White and Blues" were relegated, finishing in fourteenth place.

Despite the relegation, Unirea continued to play in Liga III, due to the withdrawal of some teams, finishing ninth in the 2010–11 season.

In the summer of 2011, Unirea withdrew from Third League and enrolled in Liga V – Timiș County, the fifth tier of the Romanian football. "The Band on the Aranca River" promoted quickly to Liga IV – Timiș County winning Series I at the end of the 2011–12 season.

The club managed to stay in the fourth division in the following years finishing 5th in three consecutive seasons 2012–13, 2013–14 and 2014–15, 6th in the 2015–16 season, 9th in the 2016–17 season, 4th in the 2017–18 season, 7th in the 2018–19 season, 11th in the 2019–20 season, 6th in the 2020–21 season and 6th in the 2021–22 season.

== Honours ==
Liga III:

- Winners (2): 2003–04, 2007–08
- Runners-up (1): 1978–79

Liga IV – Timiș County

- Winners (1): 1972–73
- Runners-up (1): 1970–71

Liga V – Timiș County

- Winners (1): 2011–12

== Club officials ==
=== Board of directors ===
Role	Name
Owner	(Romania) Sânnicolau Mare Town
President	(Romania) Flavius Sitaru
Organizer of Competitions	(Romania) Ștefan Balog

=== Current technical staff ===
Role	Name
Manager	(Romania) Cristian Contescu
Assistant Manager	(Romania) Toma Stoianov

== Former players ==
The footballers mentioned below have played at least 1 season for Unirea and also played in Liga I for another team.

- (Romania) Dan Păltinișanu
- (Ghana) Ibrahim Dossey
- (Romania) Ioan Almășan
- (Romania) Vasile Ciocoi
- (Romania) Marcel Băban
- (Romania) Ovidiu Vezan
- (Romania) Marius Postolache
- (Romania) Valentin Miculescu
- (Romania) Vasile Olariu
- (Romania) Constantin Varga

== Former managers ==
- (Romania) Adalbert Kovács (1954–1956)
- (Romania) Ioan Petcu (2004–2005)
- (Romania) Ioan Petcu (2006–2008)
