= Radu Mărginean =

Romanian footballer (1983–2026)

Personal information
- Full name: Radu Leon Mărginean
- Date of birth: 3 January 1983
- Place of birth: Arad, Romania
- Date of death: 30 June 2026 (aged 43)
- Place of death: Arad, Romania
- Height: 1.72 m (5 ft 8 in)
- Position: Midfielder

Senior career*
Years	Team	Apps	(Gls)
1999–2003	UTA Arad	84	(5)
2003–2004	Bihor Oradea	22	(2)
2004–2008	CFR Cluj	29	(1)
2006–2007	→ Gloria Bistrița (loan)	29	(0)
2008–2012	Gloria Bistrița	64	(0)
2012–2013	UTA Arad	20	(0)
2013–2014	Gloria Bistrița	39	(0)
Total		287	(8)

International career
2000	Romania U18	3	(0)
2001	Romania U19	6	(0)
2003–2005	Romania U21	9	(0)
- * Club domestic league appearances and goals

Radu Leon Mărginean (3 January 1983 – 30 June 2026) was a Romanian footballer who played as a midfielder for teams such as UTA Arad, Bihor Oradea, CFR Cluj and Gloria Bistrița.

== Career ==
Marginean was on loan to Gloria until the summer of 2007 from CFR 1907 Cluj. Marginean was the captain of the under-21 Romania national team. He was a central defensive midfielder. During the summer of 2005 Marginean was badly injured and was out for most of the 2005–06 season. He was loaned out to Gloria, but then he came back to CFR Cluj.

== Death ==
Mărginean died from a fall on 30 June 2026, at the age of 43.
