= 2005–06 Cupa României =

Tournament details
- Country: Romania

Final positions
- Champions: Rapid București
- Runners-up: Naţional București

The 2005–06 Cupa României was the 68th season of the annual Romanian football knockout tournament.

The winners of the competition qualified for the first qualifying round of the 2006–07 UEFA Cup.

== Round of 32 ==
The matches took place on September 20 and 21, 2005.

Team 1	Score	Team 2
Gaz Metan Mediaș	0–0 (a.e.t.) (2–4 p)	Oțelul Galați
Cetatea Suceava	2–1	Sportul Studențesc București
Gloria Buzău	1–2	Farul Constanţa
CS Otopeni	2–5	Politehnica Timișoara
CFR Timișoara	1–3	Naţional București
Rapid II București	0–0 (a.e.t.) (8–7 p)	Steaua București
CSM Reşiţa	0–1	Rapid București
Dunărea Galaţi	0–1	Dinamo București
FC U Craiova	1–0	CFR Cluj
Unirea Dej	0–2	Politehnica Iaşi
Bihor Oradea	0–2	Jiul Petroşani
FCM Târgoviște	3–2	Argeş Piteşti
Petrolul Ploieşti	2–1	Gloria Bistriţa
Callatis Mangalia	0–2	Pandurii Târgu Jiu
Gloria II Bistriţa	1–2	SC Vaslui
FC Brașov	2–2 (a.e.t.) (4–6 p)	FCM Bacău

== Round of 16 ==
The matches took place on October 25, 2006.

Team 1	Score	Team 2
Pandurii Târgu Jiu	0–2	Oţelul Galaţi
Cetatea Suceava	2–3	Rapid București
Petrolul Ploieşti	2–1	Dinamo București
Rapid II București	3–4	Farul Constanţa
FCM Bacău	0–2	Jiul Petroşani
Politehnica Iaşi	2–1	SC Vaslui
FCM Târgovişte	1–3	Politehnica Timișoara
Naţional București	0–0 (a.e.t.) (4–3 p)	FC U Craiova

== Quarter-finals ==
The matches took place on December 7, 2005.

Team 1	Score	Team 2
Petrolul Ploieşti	3–2	Politehnica Timișoara
Politehnica Iaşi	0–1	Rapid București
Jiul Petroşani	0–1	Farul Constanţa
Oţelul Galaţi	0–0 (a.e.t.) (3–4 p)	Naţional București

== Semi-finals ==
The 1st leg match took place on March 22, 2006. The 2nd on April 19, 2006.

Team 1	Agg.	Team 2	1st leg	2nd leg
Rapid București	7–4	Petrolul Ploieşti	4–1	3–3
Farul Constanţa	2–4	Naţional București	1–0	1–4

== Final ==
17 May 2006
20:15 EEST

Rapid București	1–0 (a.e.t.)	Naţional București
Niculae 91'	Report

Stadionul Naţional, Bucharest
Attendance: 12,000
Referee: Sorin Corpodean (Romania)

Cupa României 2005–06 winners

12th title
