= Mădălin Popa =

Romanian footballer

Personal information
- Full name: Mădălin Vasile Popa
- Date of birth: 18 July 1983 (age 43)
- Place of birth: Roman, Romania
- Height: 1.82 m (6 ft 0 in)
- Position: Midfielder

Team information
- Current team: Roman
- Number: 10

Senior career*
Years	Team	Apps	(Gls)
2002–2011	Petrotub Roman		
2012	Ceahlăul Piatra Neamț	6	(0)
2012–2018	Roman		
2018	Bradu Borca		
2019	Ozana Târgu Neamț	14	(0)
2020–2022	Speranța Răucești	14	(3)
2022–	Roman	31	(24)
- * Club domestic league appearances and goals as of 16:17, 20 January 2024 (UTC)

Mădălin Popa (born 18 July 1983) is a Romanian professional footballer who plays as a midfielder for CSM Roman, in the Liga IV. In his career Popa also played for CSM Roman and Ceahlăul Piatra Neamț.
