= Stadionul Motorul (Oradea) =

Multi-use stadium in Oradea, Romania

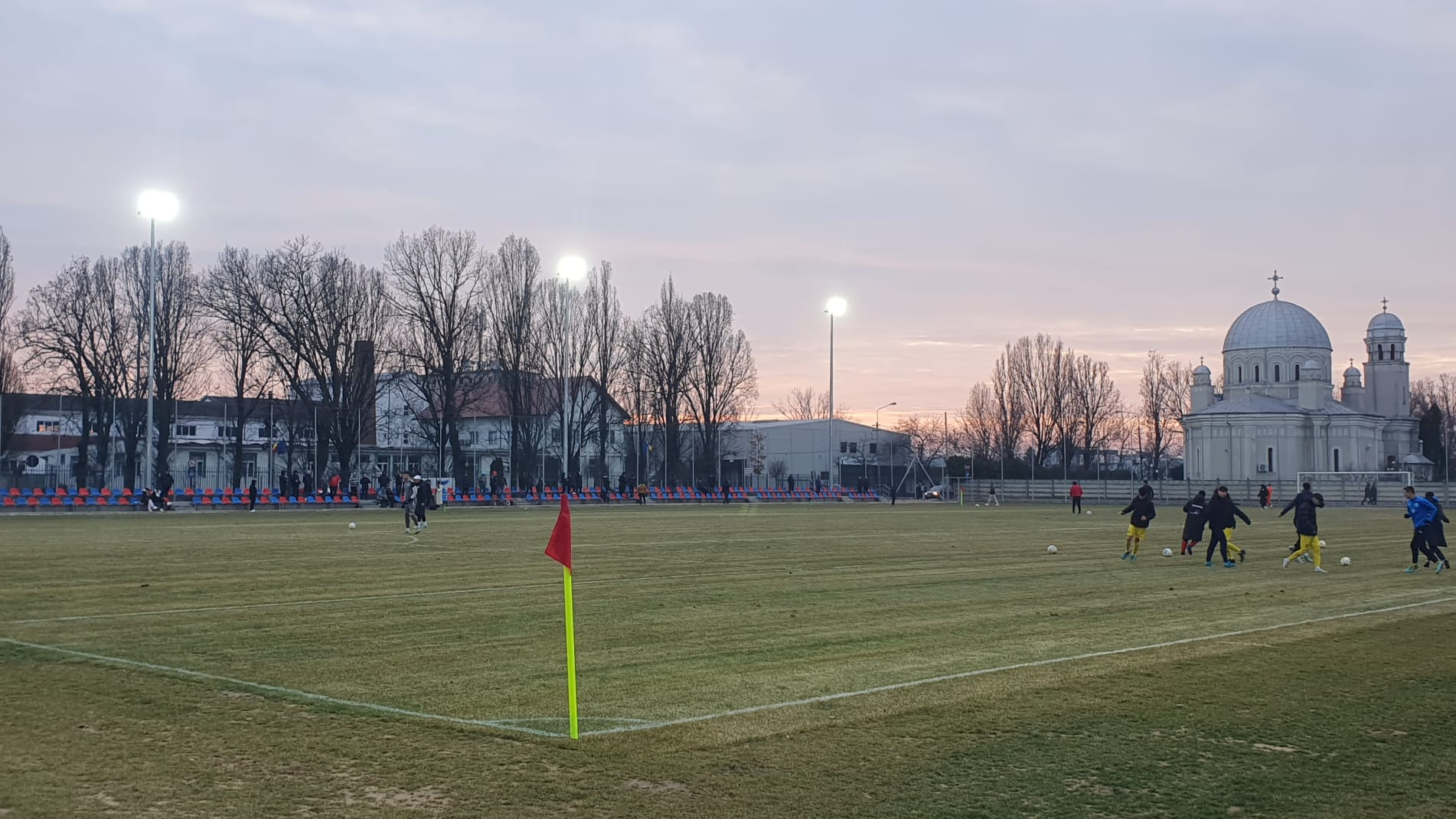
- Stadionul Motorul in 2025.
- Interactive map of Stadionul Motorul
- Address: Calea Clujului, nr. 202/C
- Location: Oradea, Romania
- Coordinates: 47°02′26.1″N 21°58′40.8″E
- Owner: Oradea Municipality
- Operator: FC Bihor Oradea
- Capacity: 320 (1st ground); 500 (2nd ground)
- Surface: grass (1st ground) artificial (2nd ground)

Construction
- Opened: 1970s
- Renovated: 2022–2025

Tenants
- Motorul Oradea (1990–2011); Bihor Oradea (2008–2016); Bihor II Oradea (2012–2015); CA Oradea youth (2017–2022); FC Bihor Academy (2025–present)

Stadionul Motorul is a multi-use stadium in Oradea, Romania. It is used mostly for football matches and is the home ground of FC Bihor Academy. In the past, Motorul Stadium was the home of Motorul Oradea and CA Oradea youth squads.

Between 2022 and 2025, the stadium was fully renovated, the project involved the complete restoration of the football field, a modern drainage system, an automated irrigation system and a high-performance floodlights system with LED lights. In addition, the field is surrounded by high protective nets and metal fences on the street front. The main stand was fully replaced, now having a capacity of 320 seats, the old locker rooms building was demolished and replaced by a new modern one.

In addition, another project was carried out together with the Investments National Company (CNI) for two more grounds, a second football pitch (with artificial turf, floodlights and a main stand with 500 seats) and a smaller tartan court, intended for sports such as handball, basketball, volleyball or tennis, fully equipped with nets, mobile gates, basketball boards and night lighting systems. Along with these facilities, a multifunctional building with a built area of almost 400 square meters offers modern locker rooms for teams and referees, toilets, a fitness room with a capacity of 50 seats and various storage spaces.

== Gallery ==
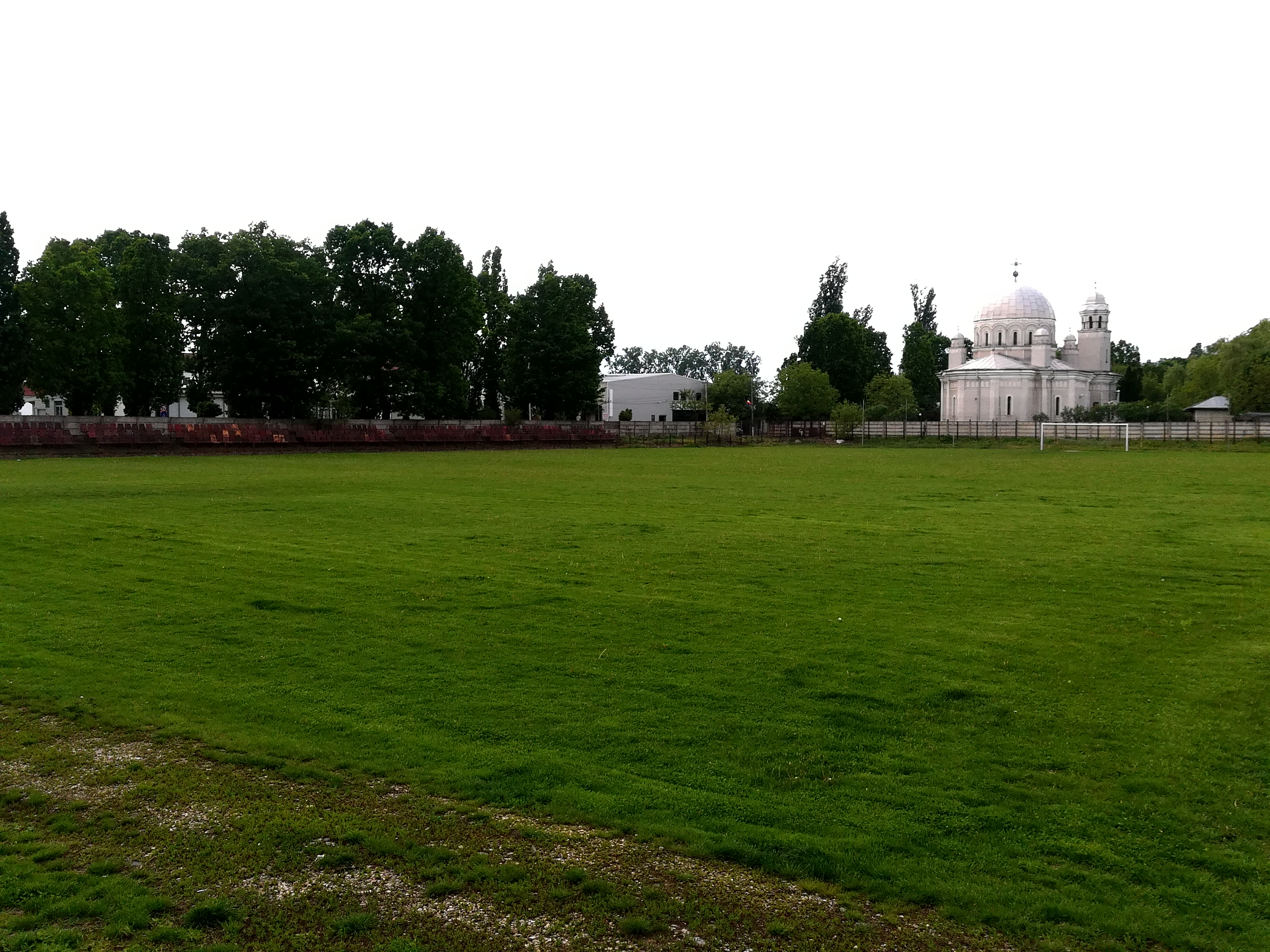
Motorul Stadium in 2019, before renovations

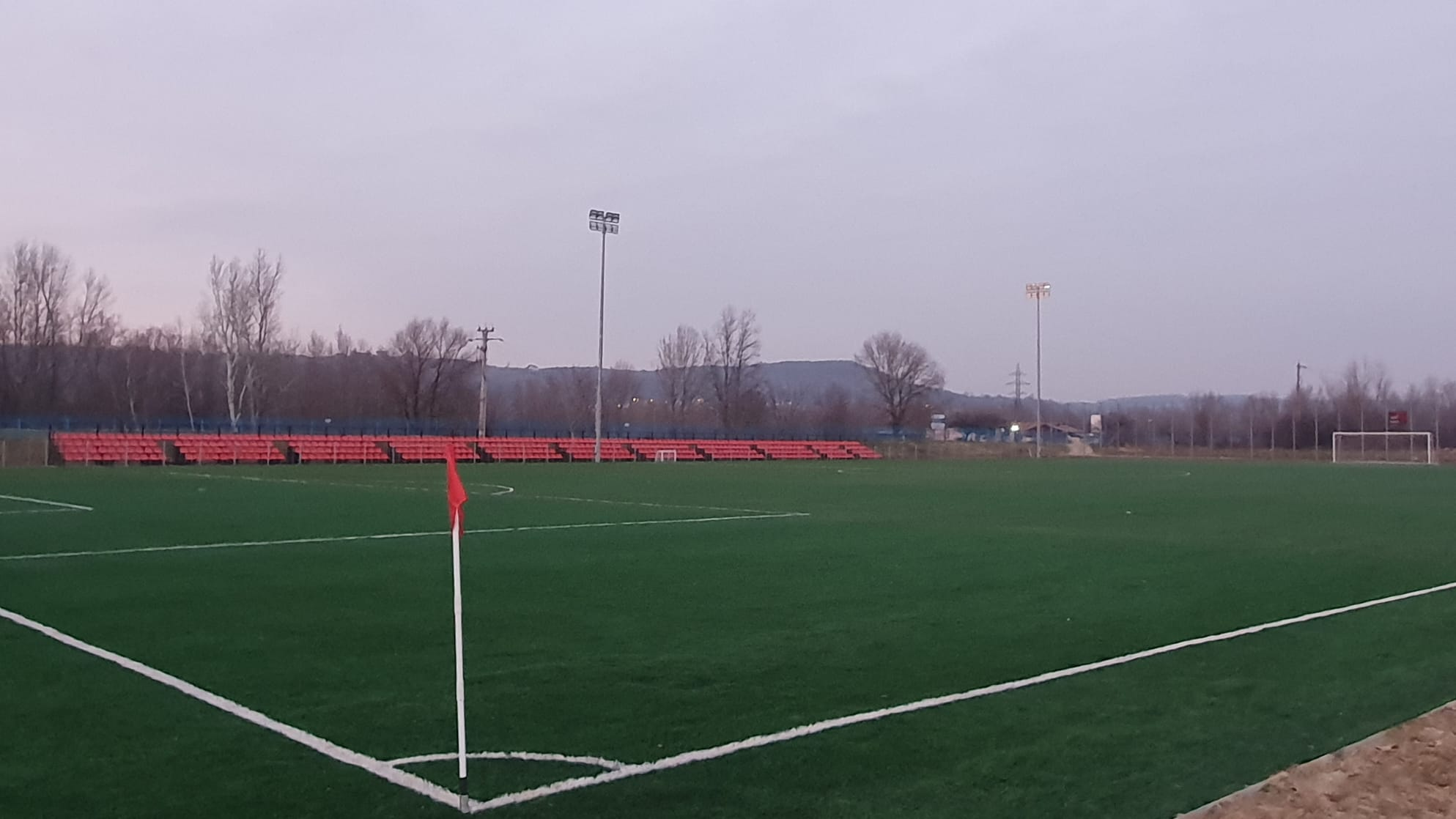
Second pitch–artificial turf
