= Dumitru Gheorghe =

Romanian wrestler

Personal information
- Nationality: Romanian
- Born: 26 October 1936 (age 88); Bucharest, Romania

Sport
- Sport: Wrestling

Dumitru Gheorghe (born 26 October 1936) is a Romanian wrestler. He competed at the 1956 Summer Olympics and the 1960 Summer Olympics.
