= Adrian Voiculeț =

Romanian footballer

Personal information
- Date of birth: 10 June 1985 (age 41)
- Place of birth: Sibiu, SR Romania
- Height: 1.80 m (5 ft 11 in)
- Position: Forward

Senior career*
Years	Team	Apps	(Gls)
2005–2006	Cămpia Turzii	11	(4)
2006–2007	Bihor Oradea	23	(6)
2007	Alba Iulia	14	(2)
2007–2010	Argeș Pitești	55	(18)
2010–2011	UTA Arad	24	(19)
2011–2012	Brașov	5	(0)
2012	Mioveni	9	(0)
2012–2013	Bihor Oradea	6	(3)
2013	UTA Arad	5	(1)
2013	Békéscsaba	4	(1)
2015	Union SAR Neuhofen/Ybbs		
Total		156	(54)
- * Club domestic league appearances and goals

Adrian Voiculeț (born 10 June 1985) is a Romanian former professional footballer who played as a forward.

== Honours ==
Argeș Pitești

- Liga II: 2007–08
