= Cornel Predescu =

Romanian footballer

Personal information
- Full name: Cornel Alexandru Predescu
- Date of birth: 21 December 1987 (age 38)
- Place of birth: Bucharest, Romania
- Height: 1.78 m (5 ft 10 in)
- Position: Attacking midfielder

Senior career*
Years	Team	Apps	(Gls)
2005–2010	Dinamo București	8	(0)
2005–2010	Dinamo București II	10	(2)
2005–2006	→ Unirea Urziceni (loan)	18	(3)
2006–2007	→ Gloria Bistrița (loan)	12	(0)
2008	→ Otopeni (loan)	8	(0)
2009	→ Astra Ploiești (loan)	2	(0)
2010–2012	Gloria Bistrița	61	(21)
2013–2014	Pandurii Târgu Jiu	16	(1)
2015	Zawisza Bydgoszcz	7	(1)
2016	Aris Limassol	19	(2)
2016–2017	Academica Clinceni	14	(4)
2017	Skënderbeu Korçë	7	(0)
2017–2018	ASU Politehnica	27	(3)
2018–2019	Balotești	25	(4)
Total		234	(41)

International career
2007	Romania U21	2	(0)
- * Club domestic league appearances and goals

Cornel Predescu (born 21 December 1987) is a Romanian former professional footballer who played as an attacking midfielder for teams such as Dinamo București, Unirea Urziceni, Aris Limassol, ASU Politehnica Timișoara or CS Balotești, among others.

== International ==
Predescu was capped with the Romanian U21 team twice.

== Honours ==
Dinamo București

- Liga I: 2006–07
