= Mădălin Marius Popa =

Romanian footballer and manager

Mădălin Popa
Personal information
- Full name: Mădălin Marius Popa
- Date of birth: 5 July 1982 (age 44)
- Place of birth: Oradea, Romania
- Position: Defender

Team information
- Current team: Unirea Livada (player-manager)
- Number: 15

Senior career*
Years	Team	Apps	(Gls)
1999–2002	Dinamo București	1	(0)
2000–2002	→ ARO Câmpulung (loan)	15	(1)
2002–2004	Dacia Unirea Brăila	35	(5)
2004–2005	FC Oradea	19	(1)
2005–2007	Nyíregyháza Spartacus	3	(0)
2007–2008	Gloria Bistrița	6	(0)
2008–2009	Pandurii Târgu Jiu	0	(0)
2009	→ Minerul Motru (loan)		
2009–2011	Pandurii II Târgu Jiu		
2012–2013	Partium Oradea		
2013	Minerul Voivozi Popești		
2014–2016	Luceafărul Oradea		
2016–	Unirea Livada	42	(6)

Managerial career
- 2016–: Unirea Livada
- * Club domestic league appearances and goals as of 27 September 2018

Mădălin Marius Popa (born 5 July 1982) is a Romanian professional footballer and manager who plays and manages for Liga IV – Bihor County side Unirea Livada.
