= Mădălin Staicu =

Romanian footballer

Personal information
- Date of birth: 16 July 1990 (age 36)
- Place of birth: Piatra Neamţ, Romania
- Height: 1.74 m (5 ft 8 1/2 in)
- Position: Midfielder

Youth career
- Ceahlăul Piatra Neamț

Senior career*
Years	Team	Apps	(Gls)
2009–2010	Ceahlăul Piatra Neamț	1	(0)
- * Club domestic league appearances and goals as of 25 February 2018

Mădălin Staicu (born 16 July 1990) is a Romanian former footballer who played in Liga I for Ceahlăul Piatra Neamț.
