= Mihai Lungan =

Romanian footballer

Personal information
- Date of birth: 29 September 1978 (age 48)
- Place of birth: Râmnicu Vâlcea, Romania
- Height: 2.00 m (6 ft 7 in)
- Positions: Defender; midfielder

Team information
- Current team: FC Păușești Otăsău (manager)

Senior career*
Years	Team	Apps	(Gls)
1995–1998	Oltchim Râmnicu Vâlcea	?	(?)
1998–1999	FC Drobeta	?	(?)
1999–2002	Bihor Oradea	?	(?)
2002–2003	Chimia Râmnicu Vâlcea	?	(?)
2003–2006	Bihor Oradea	51	(2)
2006–2007	Jiul Petroșani	23	(1)
2007	Râmnicu Vâlcea	14	(0)
2008–2010	Concordia Chiajna	10	(0)
2013–2014	F.C. Romania	?	(?)
2015–2016	Chimia 2012 Râmnicu Vâlcea	?	(?)
Total		98+	(3+)

Managerial career
- 2020–2025: Sparta Râmnicu Vâlcea
- 2025–: FC Păușești Otăsău
- * Club domestic league appearances and goals as of 15:38, 8 December 2024 (UTC)

Mihai Lungan (born 29 September 1978) is a Romanian former professional footballer who played as a defender or midfielder. He played in Liga I for Bihor Oradea and Jiul Petroșani and made his debut on 10 August 2003 in a match between Bihor Oradea and Rapid București.
