= Dorin Mihuț =

Romanian footballer

Personal information
- Full name: Dorin Adrian Mihuț
- Date of birth: 26 June 1982 (age 44)
- Place of birth: Salonta, Romania
- Height: 1.80 m (5 ft 11 in)
- Position: Right back

Team information
- Current team: FC Bihor (assistant)

Senior career*
Years	Team	Apps	(Gls)
1999–2000	Olimpia Salonta	?	(?)
2000–2006	Bihor Oradea	102	(1)
2006	Dinamo București	16	(0)
2007–2008	UTA Arad	21	(2)
2009	Râmnicu Vâlcea	9	(0)
2009–2011	UTA Arad	29	(1)
2011–2012	Luceafărul Oradea	24	(0)
2012–2013	Gyulai Termál	12	(1)
2013–2015	Bihor Oradea	30	(0)
2015	Olimpia Salonta	?	(?)
Total		243+	(5+)

International career
2005	Romania B	1	(1)

Managerial career
- 2015: Bihor Oradea (assistant)
- 2015: Olimpia Salonta
- 2015–2018: Rapid Crișul Oradea
- 2018–2022: CA Oradea (assistant)
- 2022–: FC Bihor (assistant)
- * Club domestic league appearances and goals as of 1 August 2022

Dorin Adrian Mihuț (born 26 June 1982) is a Romanian former football player who played as a right back. In his career Mihuț played for teams such as: Olimpia Salonta, FC Bihor, Dinamo București and UTA Arad, among others.

== Honours ==
=== Player ===
Dinamo București

- Romanian League Championship: 2006–07

=== Assistant coach ===
FC Bihor Oradea

- Liga III: 2023–24
