= Florin Neaga =

Romanian footballer

Personal information
- Full name: Florin Ioan Neaga
- Date of birth: 12 April 1988 (age 38)
- Place of birth: Oradea, Romania
- Height: 1.82 m (6 ft 0 in)
- Position: Forward

Youth career
- Luceafărul Oradea

Senior career*
Years	Team	Apps	(Gls)
2003	Luceafărul Oradea	?	(?)
2004–2006	Bihor Oradea	38	(6)
2006–2008	Farul Constanța	1	(0)
2008–2011	Petrolul Ploiești	3	(0)
2011–2014	Luceafărul Oradea	34	(3)
2014	→ Poiana Budureasa (loan)	?	(?)
2014–2016	Hidișelu de Sus	?	(?)
2016–2017	Universitatea Oradea	?	(?)
2017–2018	Dacia Gepiu	8	(2)
2018–2019	Oșorhei	4	(2)
- * Club domestic league appearances and goals as of 17 November 2019

Florin Ioan Neaga (born 12 April 1988) is a Romanian professional footballer who plays as a forward.
