= Sebastian Sfârlea =

Romanian footballer

Personal information
- Full name: Sebastian Ioan Sfârlea
- Date of birth: 26 July 1981 (age 45)
- Place of birth: Oradea, Romania
- Height: 1.65 m (5 ft 5 in)
- Position: Midfielder

Youth career
- Săgeata Criș Oradea
- Viitorul Oradea

Senior career*
Years	Team	Apps	(Gls)
2000–2005	Bihor Oradea	102	(11)
2005–2006	Vaslui	12	(1)
2006–2009	Politehnica Iași	80	(5)
2009–2010	Târgu Mureș	24	(2)
2010–2011	Mioveni	10	(1)
2011–2012	Bihor Oradea	17	(2)
2012	Târgu Mureș	12	(2)
2013	Gyulai Termál	15	(3)
2013	Bihor Oradea	13	(1)
2014	Kinder Paleu		
2014–2015	Luceafărul Oradea		
2015–2016	Hidișelu de Sus		
2016	Padișul Bihorul Gurani		
2017–2018	Unirea Oșorhei		
2018–2019	Crișul Sântandrei	23	(2)
Total		308+	(28)
- * Club domestic league appearances and goals

Sebastian "Sebi" Ioan Sfârlea (born 26 July 1981) is a Romanian former professional footballer who played as a midfielder. In his career, he played mostly for Bihor Oradea, but also for teams such as FC Vaslui, Politehnica Iași, FCM Târgu Mureș or CS Mioveni. Despite his height of only 1.65 m, Sfârlea is recognized for his very strong shot and is considered as a very good free kick taker.
