= Daniel Lupașcu =

Romanian footballer

Personal information
- Full name: Daniel Ștefan Lupașcu
- Date of birth: 17 August 1981 (age 45)
- Place of birth: Blaj, Romania
- Height: 1.78 m (5 ft 10 in)
- Position: Striker

Senior career*
Years	Team	Apps	(Gls)
1999–2002	CSM Reșița	64	(14)
2003	Apulum Alba Iulia	18	(5)
2004	Bihor Oradea	3	(0)
2005	Apulum Alba Iulia	12	(1)
2005–2006	Bihor Oradea	29	(3)
2007	FC Săcele	13	(13)
2007	Mioveni	12	(1)
2008–2009	Arieșul Turda	47	(9)
2009–2010	Bihor Oradea	7	(2)
2010–2011	ACU Arad	12	(2)
2011–2012	Bihorul Beiuș		
2012–2013	Oșorhei		
2013–2014	Crișul Sântandrei		
2014–2015	Luceafărul Oradea	3	(2)
2015–2017	Sânmartin		
2017–2018	Unirea Oșorhei		
2018	Crișul Sântandrei	1	(0)
2019	Biharea Vașcău		
Total		221	(52)

Managerial career
- 2015–2017: Sânmartin
- * Club domestic league appearances and goals as of 13:37, 15 June 2021 (UTC)

Daniel Ștefan Lupașcu (born 17 August 1981) is a Romanian former football player who played as a striker for teams such as CSM Reșița, Apulum Alba Iulia, Bihor Oradea or Arieșul Turda, among others. He played briefly in the Romanian Liga I with Dacia Mioveni.
