= Daniel Stan =

Romanian footballer (born 1978)

Personal information
- Full name: Daniel Dorin Stan
- Date of birth: 28 August 1978 (age 48)
- Place of birth: Curtea de Argeş, România
- Height: 1.82 m (6 ft 0 in)
- Position: Striker

Senior career*
Years	Team	Apps	(Gls)
2001–2003	Internaţional	48	(20)
2004–2005	Bihor Oradea	57	(24)
2005–2008	Oțelul Galați	66	(23)
2008–2010	Unirea Urziceni	0	(0)
2009–2010	→ Internaţional (loan)	18	(2)
2010	Petrolul Ploieşti	11	(2)
2011	Mioveni	8	(1)
2011–2012	Gloria Bistriţa	22	(4)
Total		230	(76)
- * Club domestic league appearances and goals as of 30 June 2012

Daniel Dorin Stan (born 28 August 1978) is a Romanian former football striker who played in his career for teams such as Bihor Oradea, Oțelul Galați, Internaţional and Gloria Bistriţa.
