= János Lukács =

Romanian professional footballer

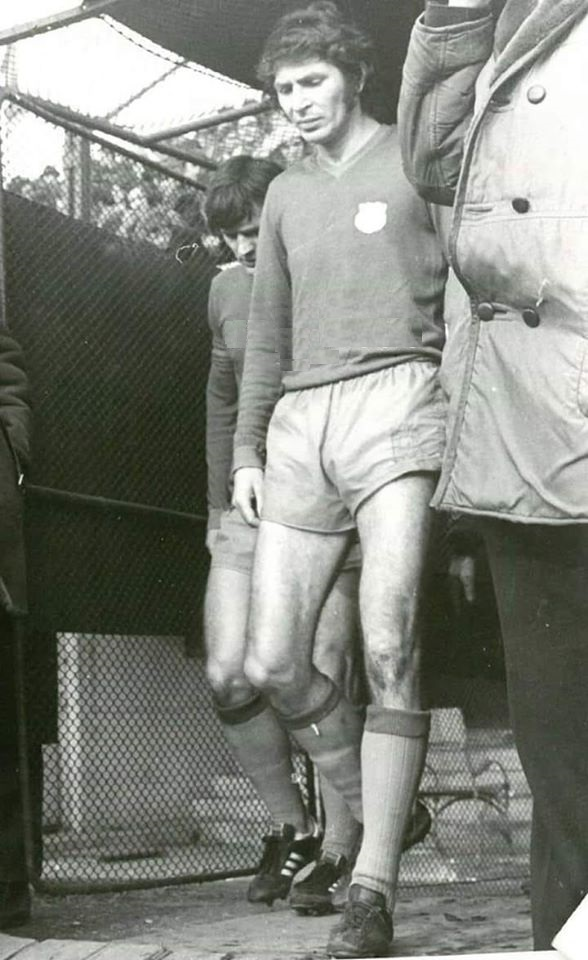
- János Lukács in 1975

Personal information
- Date of birth: 1 November 1946
- Place of birth: Tileagd, Romania
- Date of death: 6 March 2016 (aged 69)
- Place of death: Oradea, Romania
- Height: 1.83 m (6 ft 0 in)
- Position: Defender

Youth career
- 1961–1964: Forestierul Tileagd

Senior career*
Years	Team	Apps	(Gls)
1964–1965	Forestierul Tileagd		
1965–1978	Bihor Oradea	247	(8)
Total		247	(8)
- * Club domestic league appearances and goals as of 19:27, 8 January 2025 (UTC)

János Lukács (also known as Ioan Lucaci; 1 November 1946 – 6 March 2016) was a Romanian professional footballer. Lukács grew up in his hometown at the local side, Forestierul Tileagd, then in 1965 moved to Divizia A club Crișul Oradea, for which he made its debut in the top-flight.

Lukács played in 145 top-flight matches and scored 3 goals in the "red-white-blues" kits of FC Bihor (as Crișul was renamed in 1972). During the 1960s and 1970s, he was considered one of the most powerful defenders in the Romanian league and was part of the FC Bihor's golden team, together with players such as: Attila Kun, Árpád Szűcs, Paul Popovici, Cornel Georgescu, Nicolae Florescu, Alexandru Nagy, Cornel Lupău or Alexandru Gergely, among many others.

== Honours ==
Bihor Oradea

- Divizia B: 1970–71, 1974–75
