= Nicolae Florescu =

Romanian professional footballer

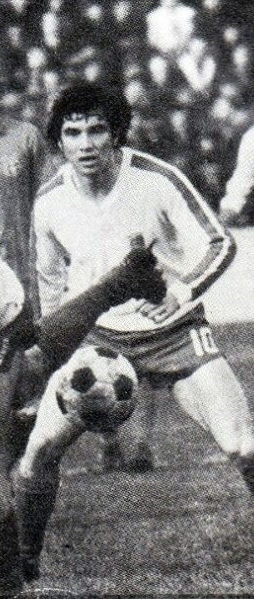
- Florescu in 1975

Personal information
- Date of birth: 14 November 1949
- Place of birth: Codlea, Romania
- Date of death: 21 September 2011 (aged 61)
- Place of death: Codlea, Romania
- Height: 1.82 m (6 ft 0 in)
- Position: Forward

Youth career
- 1963–1967: Colorom Codlea

Senior career*
Years	Team	Apps	(Gls)
1967–1972	Steagul Roșu Brașov	107	(35)
1972–1981	Bihor Oradea	195	(61)
1979	→ Înfrățirea Oradea (loan)		
1981–1984	Minerul Bihor		
1984–1985	Unirea Valea lui Mihai		
Total		302	(96)

Managerial career
- 1981–1984: Minerul Bihor (player/ manager)
- 1984–1985: Unirea Valea lui Mihai (player/manager)
- 1985–1992: LPS Bihorul
- 1996: Bihor Oradea
- * Club domestic league appearances and goals as of 3 July 2020

Nicolae "Bubi" Florescu (14 November 1949 – 21 September 2011) was a Romanian professional footballer and manager. In his career, he played mostly for Steagul Roșu Brașov and FC Bihor Oradea, but also for teams such as Înfrățirea Oradea, Minerul Bihor and Unirea Valea lui Mihai.

As a manager, Florescu activated at third tier clubs such as Minerul Bihor or Unirea Valea lui Mihai and until 1992 he was a coach at the Bihorul Sports High School (LPS Bihorul).

== Club career ==
=== Steagul Roșu Brașov ===
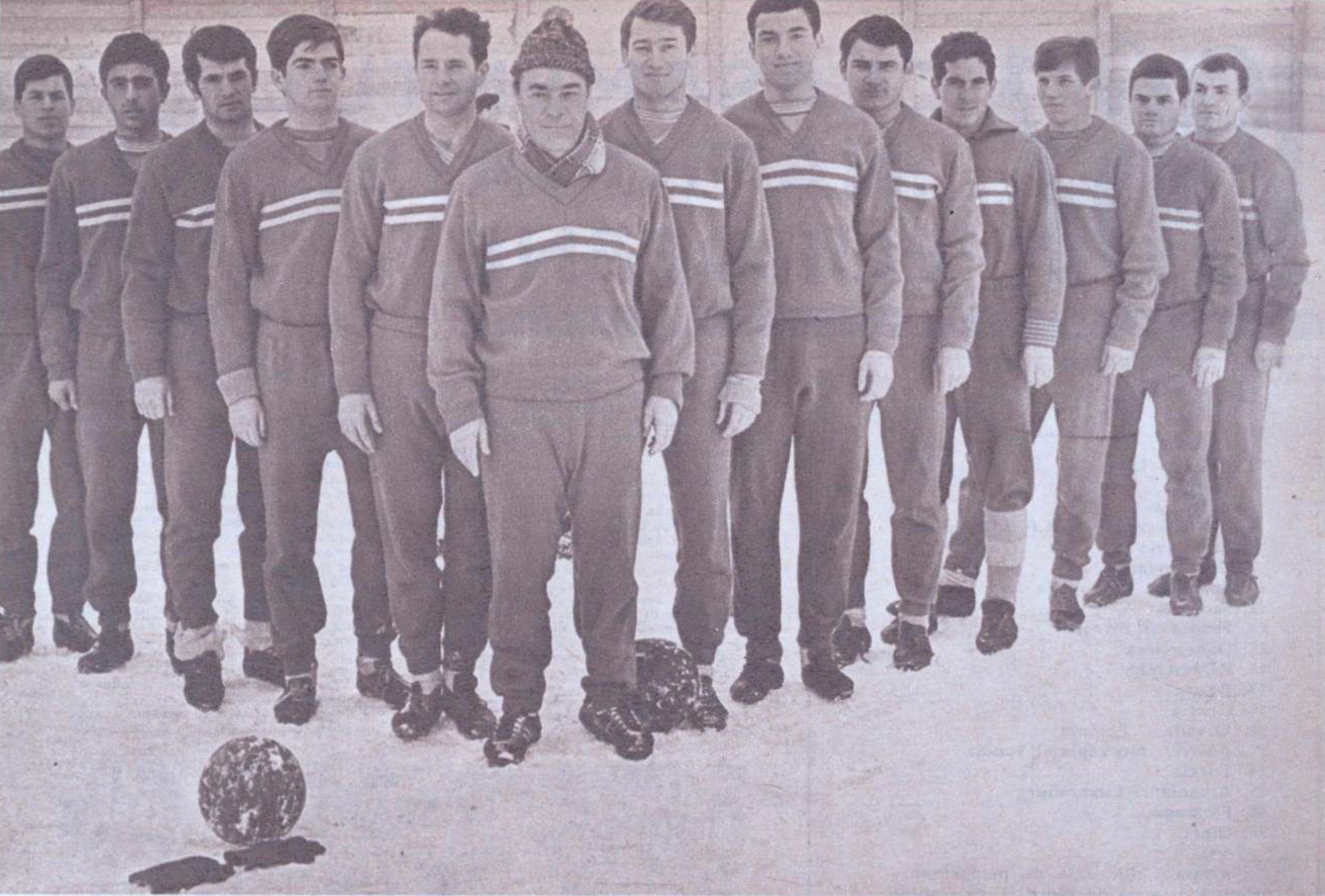
Florescu (sixth from the right) during a winter training session with Brașov in 1968

Florescu started his senior career at Steagul Roșu Brașov in 1967, where he also made his debut in the Divizia A. On 26 November 1967, he scored the only goal of a victory against ASA Târgu Mureș, now that goal ranking him as the 10th youngest scorer in the history of the team from Brașov.

Florescu played in 107 matches (82 in the Divizia A and 25 in the Divizia B) and scored 35 goals (20 in the Divizia A and 15 in the Divizia B) for Steagul Roșu Brașov. At "the Flaggers" he was part of a squad that was formed by players such as Mihai Ivăncescu, Iuliu Jenei, Marin Olteanu, Stere Adamache, Mircea Albu, Petru Cadar, Francisc Bálint, Alexandru Gergely, Dorin Necula, Emil Dumitriu, Nicolae Pescaru, Liviu Drăgoi, Csaba Györffy, Leonard Rusu or Octavian Cojocaru, among others.

=== Bihor Oradea ===
In 1972, Florescu left Steagul Roșu Brașov for the second-tier side FC Bihor Oradea, where in the next years was followed by two former teammates, Mircea Albu and Alexandru Gergely. The three men from Brașov, together with local players such as Attila Kun, Ioan Agud, Gheorghe Dărăban, Paul Popovici, Constantin Bigan, Árpád Szűcs, Ioan Naom, Cornel Georgescu or Cornel Lupău made a team, that over years would be known as "the golden generation of FC Bihor".

He played in 102 top-flight matches for "the red and blues" and approx. 130 second tier matches, also scoring 26 goals in the Divizia A. Nicolae Florescu is considered now a legend of FC Bihor.

=== Late years ===
After 1983, he played and managed for Divizia C clubs Minerul Bihor and Unirea Valea lui Mihai, then until 1992 worked as a coach for the Bihorul Sports High School (LPS Bihorul).

== International career ==
Nicolae Florescu was selected by the Romania national football team in 1978, for a friendly tournament that was held in Scotland.

== Death ==
Nicolae Florescu died on 21 September 2011, at only 61 years old, after a long suffering.

== Honours ==
Steagul Roșu Brașov

- Divizia B: 1968–69

Bihor Oradea

- Divizia B: 1974–75, 1981–82
