= Alexandru Muta =

Romanian professional footballer

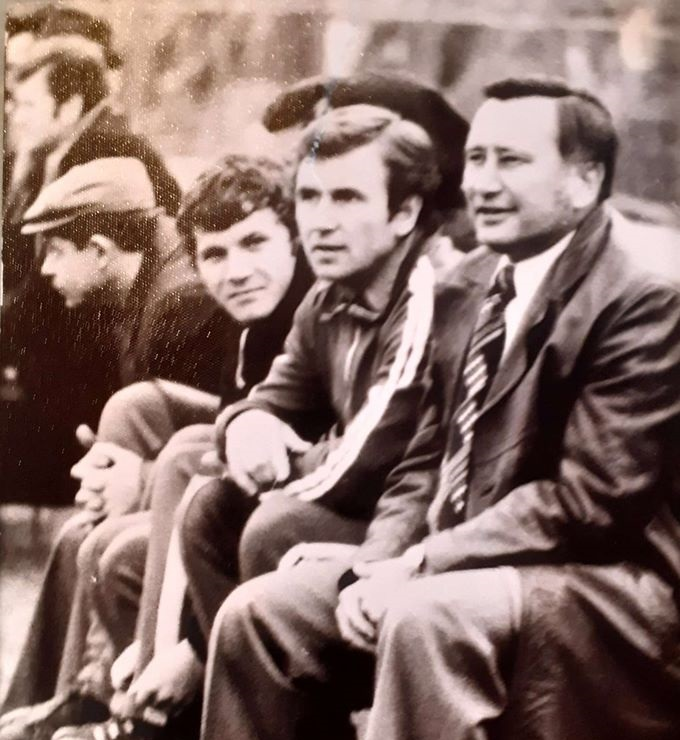
- Cosmoc (right), Muta (center) and Georgescu (left) on the bench of FC Bihor (1976)

Personal information
- Date of birth: 1935
- Place of birth: Oradea, Romania
- Date of death: 8 June 2012 (aged 76)
- Place of death: Oradea, Romania

Managerial career
- Years: Team
- 1976–1977: Bihor Oradea (assistant)
- 1978–1980: Tractorul Brașov
- 1980–1982: Bihor Oradea (assistant)
- 1983–1990: Bihor Oradea (youth center)
- 1983: Bihor Oradea (assistant)
- 1984: Bihor Oradea (assistant)
- 1985: Bihor Oradea (assistant)
- 1986: Bihor Oradea (assistant)
- 1990–1991: Bihor Oradea
- 1991–1993: Bihor Oradea (youth center)
- 1993–1994: Bihor Oradea
- 1994–1997: Bihor Oradea (youth center)
- 1997–1998: Bihor Oradea
- 1998–2000: Bihor Oradea (youth center)
- 2000: Bihor Oradea (caretaker)
- 2001–2002: Luceafărul Oradea (youth center)
- 2002–2004: Bihor Oradea (youth center)
- 2004: Bihor Oradea (technical director)
- 2004–2005: Frontiera Oradea

Alexandru Muta (1935 – 8 June 2012) was a Romanian football manager who worked mainly for FC Bihor Oradea. Over the years, he performed several functions, from youth coach and youth center manager to technical director, manager and assistant manager of the senior squad.

Alexandru Muta managed FC Bihor Oradea in the top-flight of the Romanian football during the 1990–91 season and as an assistant manager collaborated with important managers such as Ioan Reinhardt, Robert Cosmoc, Ștefan Coidum or Gheorghe Staicu.

Despite his good CV at senior level, Muta was recognized in Romania as one of the most important coaches of the youth sector, over time promoting players such as Zeno Bundea, Cristian Lupuț, Cosmin Bărcăuan or Erik Lincar, among many others. He was also considered as an important professor and theorist, Mircea Lucescu affirming that he was inspired several times by Muta's work.

== Honours ==
Bihor Oradea

- Divizia B: 1981–82, 1987–88
- Divizia C: 1997–98
