= Nicolae Mureșan =

Romanian footballer (born 1956)

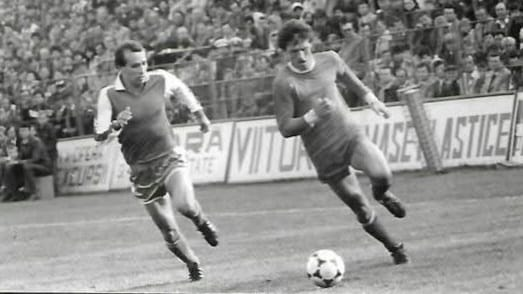
- Mureșan (right) and Țicleanu (left) in a Divizia A match during the 1983–84 season.

Personal information
- Full name: Nicolae Florentin Mureșan
- Date of birth: 19 January 1956 (age 70)
- Place of birth: Oradea, Romania
- Height: 1.80 m (5 ft 11 in)
- Position: Defensive midfielder

Youth career
- 1966–1975: Bihor Oradea

Senior career*
Years	Team	Apps	(Gls)
1975–1976	Bihor Oradea	5	(0)
1976–1978	Înfrățirea Oradea		
1978–1991	Bihor Oradea	342	(44)
Total		347	(44)
- * Club domestic league appearances and goals as of 15:02, 7 January 2025 (UTC)

Nicolae Florentin Mureșan (born 19 January 1956) is a Romanian former professional footballer. Mureșan grew up in the youth academy of FC Bihor Oradea, club for which he played almost its entire career, in over 340 matches (196 matches in Divizia A). He was the most constant player of the team during the 1980s, one of the best periods in the history of the club and is also the most-capped player alongside Cornel Georgescu. After 1991, Nicolae Mureșan moved to Canada, but he periodically returns to Oradea in order to meet his former teammates.

== Honours ==
Bihor Oradea

- Divizia B: 1981–82, 1987–88

Înfrățirea Oradea

- Divizia C: 1977–78
