= Terheș =

Terheș is a Romanian surname. Notable people with the surname include:

- Alexandru Terheș (born 1960), Romanian footballer
- Cristian Terheș (born 1978), Romanian politician and journalist
