= Chis =

Chis or CHIS may refer to:

- Chis, France, a commune in France
- Chi, plural chis
- Chi Alpha Delta, or Chis, an American sorority
- Covert human intelligence source, or CHIS
- Chiș, Romanian surname, people with the name include:
  - Cătălin Chiș (born 1988), football player
  - Filonaș Chiș (born 1950), politician
  - Gheorghe Chiș (1913-1981), mathematician and astronomer

== See also ==
- Chis and Sid, an English grammar school
