= Sándor Kulcsár =

Romanian footballer

Personal information
- Date of birth: 16 July 1965 (age 61)
- Place of birth: Pericei, Romania
- Height: 1.75 m (5 ft 9 in)
- Position: Forward

Youth career
- 1975–1986: Bihor Oradea

Senior career*
Years	Team	Apps	(Gls)
1986–1988	Bihor Oradea	50	(29)
1988–1989	Victoria București	32	(12)
1990–1992	Bihor Oradea	41	(9)
1992–1997	Békéscsaba Előre	147	(44)
1997–1998	Diósgyőr	49	(22)
1999	Ferencváros	27	(3)
2000	Siófok	15	(6)
2000	Nyíregyháza Spartacus	12	(1)
2001	Diósgyőr		
2001–2003	Bőcs	48	(26)
Total		421	(152)

Managerial career
- 2009: Bihor Oradea (assistant)
- * Club domestic league appearances and goals as of 16:06, 7 January 2025 (UTC)

Sándor Kulcsár (also known as Alexandru Culcear; born 16 July 1965) is a Romanian former professional football player and manager of Hungarian ethnicity.

== Club career ==
Born in Pericei, Kulcsár started his football career at FC Bihor Oradea for which he played in two Liga II season. In the 1987–88 season he scored 23 goals for the red and blues, being transferred at Victoria București, club owned by the miliția and managed by Dumitru Dragomir. Every player that signed with Victoria was automatically enrolled in the miliția, but Kulcsár was a Hungarian ethnic, so the Romanian Communist Party forced him to change his name into one with a Romanian resonance, being known between 1988 and 1990 as Alexandru Culcear. In 1990 the Ceaușescu's dictatorship fell and Victoria was dissolved, being accused of misleading performances. Kulcsár returned for 2 seasons at Bihor Oradea until the club relegated in the second league. From 1992 until his retirement Sándor played in Hungary for various clubs such as: Békéscsaba Előre, Diósgyőr, Ferencváros or Nyíregyháza Spartacus, among others.

== Manager career ==
In 2009 he was for a short period the assistant manager of Ovidiu Lazăr at Bihor Oradea.

In 2022 he was appointed the first president of the new club FC Bihor Oradea (2022).
