= Gheorghe Dărăban =

Romanian footballer (1946–2017)

Personal information
- Date of birth: 2 October 1946
- Place of birth: Holod, Romania
- Date of death: 3 January 2017 (aged 70)
- Place of death: Oradea, Romania
- Height: 1.80 m (5 ft 11 in)
- Position: Attacking midfielder

Youth career
- 1960–1962: Steaua Roșie Beiuș

Senior career*
Years	Team	Apps	(Gls)
1962–1965	Steaua Roșie Beiuș		
1965–1966	Victoria Târgu Jiu		
1966–1967	Steaua Roșie Salonta		
1967–1968	Minerul Bihor		
1968–1976	Bihor Oradea	179	(16)
Total		179	(16)

Managerial career
- 1978–1980: Bihor Oradea (youth center)
- 1980–1981: Bihor Oradea
- 1981–1983: Bihor Oradea (youth center)
- 1983: Bihor Oradea (assistant)
- 1983–1984: Bihor Oradea
- 1985: Bihor Oradea (assistant)
- 1985: Bihor Oradea
- 1986: Bihor Oradea
- 1986–1990: Bihor Oradea (youth center)
- * Club domestic league appearances and goals as of 22:58, 11 January 2025 (UTC)

Gheorghe Dărăban (2 October 1946 – 3 January 2017) was a Romanian professional footballer and football manager. Dărăban grew up in Bihorul Beiuș youth center (known at that time under the name of Steaua Roșie Beiuș. He mad his senior debut at the age of 16, then after he graduate the high school moved to Victoria Târgu Jiu, then to Steaua Roșie Salonta and Minerul Bihor. At the age of 22 he was remarked by FC Bihor Oradea club for which he made his debut in the 1967–68 promotion play-off. He played for FC Bihor in 179 matches and scored 16 goals (79 matches and 6 goals in Divizia A) then, after retirement, managed FC Bihor Oradea in various occasions as a head coach or assistant coach, at the level of the Divizia A and Divizia B.

Gheorghe Dărăban died on 3 January 2017 at the age of 70 and was buried in the Rulikowski Cemetery in Oradea.

== Honours ==
Bihor Oradea

- Divizia B: 1970–71, 1974–75
