= Eugen Nagy =

Romanian professional footballer

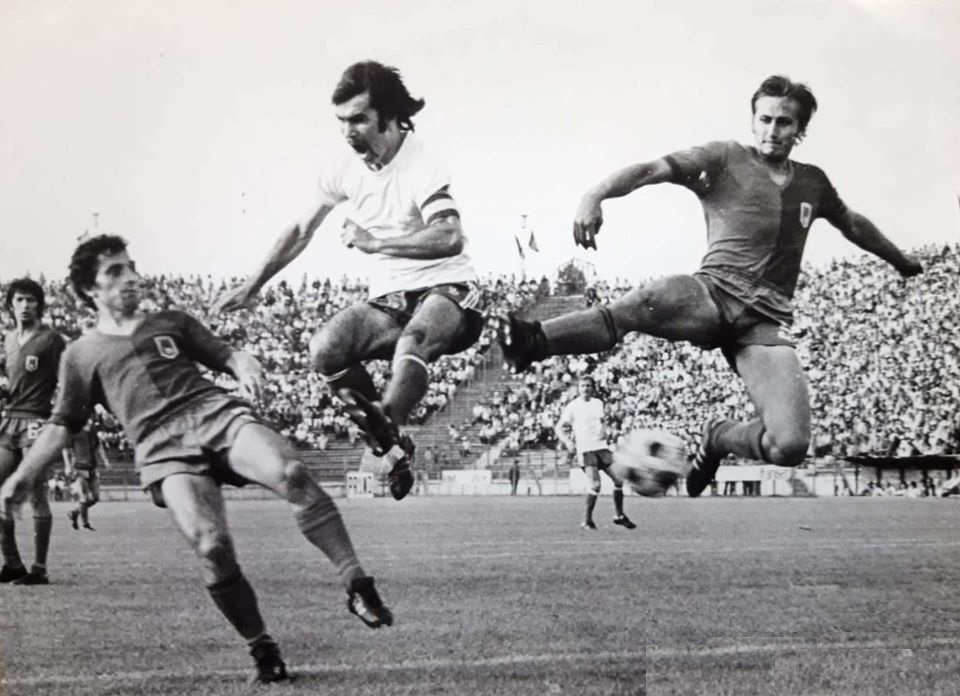
- E. Nagy (left) and M. Marian (right) stopping Iordănescu in the 1975–76 Cupa României semi-final.

Personal information
- Date of birth: 16 April 1944
- Place of birth: Oradea, Romania
- Date of death: 2006 (aged 62)
- Place of death: Oradea, Romania
- Height: 1.71 m (5 ft 7 in)
- Positions: Defender; midfielder

Youth career
- 1958: Metalul Oradea

Senior career*
Years	Team	Apps	(Gls)
1964–1977	Bihor Oradea	245	(3)
1977–1980	Voința Oradea		
Total		275	(1)

Managerial career
- Bihor Oradea (youth)
- * Club domestic league appearances and goals as of 15 July 2020

Eugen Nagy (Naghi) (also known as Jenő Nagy; 16 April 1944 – 2006) was a Romanian professional footballer. He played as a sweeper (libero) for teams such as FC Bihor Oradea or Voința Oradea and after retirement worked as a football coach in the youth center of FC Bihor.

== Club career ==
Nagy played initially as a midfielder and made his debut in the Divizia A in 1964, for FC Bihor Oradea (named at that time as Crișul Oradea). Subsequently he started to play as a defender, especially as a sweeper (libero) and was for years one of the FC Bihor's captains and an important player.

Eugen Nagy played in approx. 245 matches (125 in the top-flight) for FC Bihor Oradea and scored 1 goal. He achieved a semi-final of the Romanian Cup during the 1975–76 season, best performance of the club in this competition.

Between 1977 and 1980, former captain of "the red and blues" played for the third tier club Voința Oradea, then retired in 1980, at 36 years. After retirement he worked as a coach in the youth center of FC Bihor.

== Honours ==
Bihor Oradea

- Divizia B: 1970–71, 1974–75
