= Alexandru Sorian =

Romanian footballer

Personal information
- Full name: Alexandru Ioan Sorian
- Date of birth: 5 January 1991 (age 35)
- Place of birth: Sânmartin, Romania
- Height: 1.80 m (5 ft 11 in)
- Position: Midfielder

Team information
- Current team: Bihorul Beiuș

Youth career
- 2005–2009: Liberty Salonta

Senior career*
| Years | Team | Apps | (Gls) |
| 2007–2013 | Liberty Salonta | 43 | (1) |
| 2010–2013 | → Bihor Oradea (loan) | 72 | (5) |
| 2013–2015 | Bihor Oradea | 32 | (1) |
| 2013–2014 | → Săgeata Năvodari (loan) | 9 | (1) |
| 2015–2016 | UTA Arad | 4 | (0) |
| 2016–2017 | Luceafărul Oradea | 10 | (0) |
| 2017 | SV Hollenburg | 12 | (1) |
| 2017–2018 | Metalurgistul Cugir | 27 | (1) |
| 2018–2021 | Sânmartin | 47 | (20) |
| 2021–2022 | SCM Zalău | 18 | (1) |
| 2022–2023 | Lotus Băile Felix | 27 | (4) |
| 2023–2024 | FC Bihor | 13 | (1) |
| 2024–2025 | Crișul Sântandrei | 26 | (1) |
| 2025 | Sighetu Marmației | 13 | (0) |
| 2026– | Bihorul Beiuș | 0 | (0) |
- * Club domestic league appearances and goals as of 15:55, 18 January 2026 (UTC)

Alexandru Ioan Sorian (born 5 January 1991) is a Romanian professional footballer who plays as a midfielder for Bihorul Beiuș. In his career, Sorian also played for teams such as Liberty Salonta, Bihor Oradea, Săgeata Năvodari, UTA Arad or CSC Sânmartin, among others.
