= Zoran Mijanović =

Serbian footballer

Personal information
- Full name: Zoran Mijanović
- Date of birth: 5 June 1974 (age 52)
- Place of birth: Novi Sad, SR Serbia, SFR Yugoslavia
- Height: 1.90 m (6 ft 3 in)
- Position: Goalkeeper

Team information
- Current team: Buriram United (goalkeeping coach)

Senior career*
| Years | Team | Apps | (Gls) |
| 1994–1998 | Vojvodina | 50 | (0) |
| 1998–2002 | Farense | 49 | (0) |
| 2003 | Legia Warsaw | 4 | (0) |
| 2006 | Bihor Oradea | | |
| 2006–2007 | Olhanense | 0 | (0) |
| 2008 | Bežanija | 12 | (0) |
| 2008–2011 | Nybergsund | 22 | (0) |
| 2013 | Sloboda Užice | 0 | (0) |
| Total | | 159+ | (0+) |
- * Club domestic league appearances and goals

Zoran Mijanović (Serbian Cyrillic: Зоран Мијановић; born 5 June 1974) is a Serbian former professional footballer who played as a goalkeeper. He is currently the goalkeeping coach of Thai club Buriram United.

== Career ==
Mijanović played 52 matches for Vojvodina in the First League of FR Yugoslavia from 1994 to 1998, before transferring to Portuguese side Farense. He spent four years with the club and made 50 appearances in the Primeira Liga. In early 2003, Mijanović moved to Poland and signed with Legia Warsaw. He also played in the lower leagues of Romania and Norway.
