= Ciprian Selagea =

Romanian footballer

Personal information
- Full name: Ciprian Silviu Selagea
- Date of birth: 21 January 1990 (age 36)
- Place of birth: Alba Iulia, Romania
- Height: 1.80 m (5 ft 11 in)
- Position: Midfielder

Youth career
- 2000–2007: Unirea Alba Iulia

Senior career*
Years	Team	Apps	(Gls)
2007–2010	Unirea Alba Iulia	67	(5)
2011–2013	Bihor Oradea	48	(6)
2013–2014	Rapid București	22	(2)
2015–2016	Olimpia Satu Mare	28	(2)
2016–2021	Unirea Alba Iulia	108	(22)
2021–2024	Metalurgistul Cugir	50	(6)
Total		323	(43)

International career
2010–2011	Romania U-21	1	(0)
- * Club domestic league appearances and goals as of 12:21, 25 December 2024 (UTC)

Ciprian Silviu Selagea (born 21 January 1990) is a Romanian former professional footballer who played as a midfielder. In his career, Selagea also played for teams such as Unirea Alba Iulia, FC Bihor Oradea, Rapid București, Olimpia Satu Mare or Metalurgistul Cugir.
