= Mircea Albu =

Romanian footballer (born 1951)

Personal information
- Date of birth: 27 May 1951 (age 75)
- Place of birth: Brașov, Romania
- Height: 1.90 m (6 ft 3 in)
- Position: Goalkeeper

Senior career*
Years	Team	Apps	(Gls)
1970–1973	Steagul Roșu Brașov	2	(0)
1973–1974	Bihor Oradea	33	(0)
1974	Universitatea Cluj	2	(0)
1975–1983	Bihor Oradea	198	(0)
Total		235	(0)
- * Club domestic league appearances and goals as of 21:42, 8 January 2025 (UTC)

Mircea Albu (born 27 May 1951) is a Romanian former professional footballer who played as a goalkeeper for Steagul Roșu Brașov, Universitatea Cluj and FC Bihor Oradea. Albu grew up in the youth center of Steagul Roșu Brașov, but was a constant player for FC Bihor Oradea, for which he played in 231 matches (91 matches in the Divizia A), entering in the hall of fame of the club.

On 26 November 2022, Albu stepped again on the pitch of Iuliu Bodola Stadium, the place where he made history, this time for the kickoff of the game between FC Bihor Oradea and CFR II Cluj, as a special guest.

== Honours ==
Bihor Oradea

- Divizia B: 1974–75, 1981–82
