= Gabriel Rotaru =

Romanian footballer

Personal information
- Date of birth: 8 January 1971 (age 55)
- Place of birth: Luduş, Romania
- Height: 1.86 m (6 ft 1 in)
- Position: Goalkeeper

Team information
- Current team: Mureșul Luduș
- Number: 1

Senior career*
| Years | Team | Apps | (Gls) |
| 1985–1988 | Mureșul Luduș | ? | (?) |
| 1988–2000 | ASA Târgu Mureș | 124 | (1) |
| 1996–1997 | → IS Câmpia Turzii (loan) | 0 | (0) |
| 1998–1999 | → Steaua București (loan) | 3 | (0) |
| 2000–2004 | Bihor Oradea | 90 | (0) |
| 2004–2005 | IS Câmpia Turzii | 24 | (0) |
| 2005–2011 | Unirea Alba Iulia | 130 | (0) |
| 2011–2012 | Europa Alba Iulia | ? | (?) |
| 2012–2013 | Inter Sânger | ? | (?) |
| 2013 | Mureșul Luduș | ? | (?) |
| 2013 | Spicul Gheja | ? | (?) |
| 2013– | Mureșul Luduș | ? | (?) |

Managerial career
- 2011: Unirea Alba Iulia
- 2015–2017: CNP Târgu Mureș (GK coach)
- * Club domestic league appearances and goals as of 28 February 2018

Gabriel Rotaru (born 8 January 1971) is a Romanian footballer who plays for Liga IV club Mureșul Luduș.
