= Miroslav Vidac =

Romanian footballer

Personal information
- Date of birth: 4 September 1949
- Place of birth: Cenad, Romania
- Date of death: 24 April 2011 (aged 61)
- Place of death: Arad, Romania
- Height: 1.77 m (5 ft 10 in)
- Position: Goalkeeper

Youth career
- 1963–1966: Electromotor Timișoara

Senior career*
Years	Team	Apps	(Gls)
1966–1970	Politehnica Timișoara	42	(0)
1971–1974	UTA Arad	66	(0)
1974–1980	Bihor Oradea	85	(0)
1980–1985	Strungul Arad		
Total		193	(0)
- * Club domestic league appearances and goals

Miroslav Vidac (4 September 1949 – 24 April 2011) was a Romanian footballer who played as a goalkeeper.

== Honours ==
Bihor Oradea

- Divizia B: 1974–75
