= Alexandru Nagy =

Romanian professional footballer

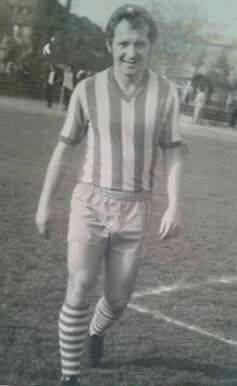
- Alexandru Nagy in 1975

Personal information
- Date of birth: 28 October 1946
- Place of birth: Oradea, Romania
- Date of death: 1994 (aged 46)
- Place of death: Oradea, Romania
- Height: 1.70 m (5 ft 7 in)
- Position: Midfielder

Youth career
- 1961–1963: Crișana Oradea
- 1963–1964: Crișul Oradea

Senior career*
Years	Team	Apps	(Gls)
1964–1972	Crișul Oradea	82	(8)
1972–1975	Jiul Petroșani	68	(4)
1975–1977	FC Bihor Oradea	54	(1)
Total		205	(13)
- * Club domestic league appearances and goals as of 13 July 2020

Alexandru Nagy (Hungarian: Nagy Sándor, 28 October 1946 – 1994) was a Romanian professional footballer. Nagy grew up in the youth academies of Crișana Oradea and Crișul Oradea, making its debut in the top-flight for Crișul, in 1965. He played in 83 matches for Crișul (52 in the Divizia A), then in 1972 moved to Jiul Petroșani, where also arrived his former teammate, Árpád Szűcs (via Mureșul Deva).

Jiul won 1974 Cupa României with Nagy as an essential player, together with other important names of the Romanian football, such as Petre Libardi, Árpád Szűcs, Gheorghe Mulțescu, Adalbert Rozsnyai or Mihai Stoichiță. Nagy would play with Jiul the only two European matches in the history of the club, a two-legged encounter against Dundee United, during the 1974–75 European Cup Winners' Cup season.

In 1975, Nagy moved back to Crișul Oradea, now renamed as FC Bihor Oradea, where he spent two more seasons in the top-flight, playing in 54 matches. Nagy retired in 1977, after 13 seasons of football, 174 matches in the top-flight and 8 goals.

== Honours ==
Crișul Oradea

- Divizia B: 1970–71

Jiul Petroșani

- Cupa României: 1973–74
