= Ion Adrian Zare =

Romanian footballer (1959–2022)

Ion Zare
Personal information
- Full name: Ion Adrian Zare
- Date of birth: 11 May 1959
- Place of birth: Oradea, Romania
- Date of death: 23 February 2022 (aged 62)
- Place of death: Oradea, Romania
- Position: Defender

Senior career*
Years	Team	Apps	(Gls)
1974–1985	Bihor Oradea	207	(13)
1985–1987	Dinamo București	43	(3)
1987–1989	Victoria București	54	(3)
1989–1990	Farul Constanța	10	(0)
1990–1993	Siófok	87	(7)
1993–1994	Pécs	13	(0)
Total		325	(19)

International career
1984–1987	Romania	7	(0)

Managerial career
- 2008: AS Roșia
- 2008–2011: Bihor Oradea (youth)
- * Club domestic league appearances and goals

Ion Adrian Zare (11 May 1959 – 23 February 2022) was a Romanian footballer who played as a defender.

== International career ==
Zare earned seven caps for Romania, making his debut on 11 April 1984 under coach Mircea Lucescu in a friendly which ended 0–0 against Israel. His second game was a 2–1 loss against West Germany at Euro 1984 when he was sent by Mircea Lucescu at half-time in order to replace Gheorghe Hagi. Zare's following five games were friendlies, the last one taking place on 11 March 1987, a 1–1 against Greece.

== Death ==
Zare died on 23 February 2022, at the age of 62.

== Honours ==
Bihor Oradea

- Divizia B: 1981–82

Dinamo București

- Cupa României: 1985–86
