= FC Bihor Oradea (1958) =

- Full name: Fotbal Club Bihor Oradea
- Nicknames: Roș-Albaștrii (The Red and Blues); Bihorenii (The People from Bihor County); Orădenii (The People from Oradea)
- Short name: FC Bihor
- Founded: 1 April 1958
- Dissolved: 12 January 2016
- Ground: Iuliu Bodola
- Website: www.fcbihor.ro
Home colours	Away colours

Fotbal Club Bihor Oradea (Romanian pronunciation: [biˈhor oˈrade̯a]), commonly known as Bihor Oradea or simply as FC Bihor, was a Romanian professional football club based in Oradea, Bihor County.

It was founded under the name of Crișul Oradea in April 1958 and from 1963 it continued the football tradition of the city, following the dissolution of Club Atletic Oradea. In the 57 seasons spent in the Romanian football league system, FC Bihor played 18 seasons in the first division, 39 seasons in the second league, and only 5 seasons in the lower leagues, respectively 4 in the Liga III and only one season, its first, in the fourth tier. This ranks the club on the 24th place out of 98 in the Liga I all-time table. In January 2016, FC Bihor was dissolved after having faced significant financial issues.

The home ground of "the Red and Blues" was Stadionul Iuliu Bodola, which has a seating capacity of 11,155.

== History ==
Chart of yearly table positions of FC Bihor in the national leagues since their first promotion in 1961 to their dissolution in 2016.

=== Early years, as Crișul (1958–1972) ===
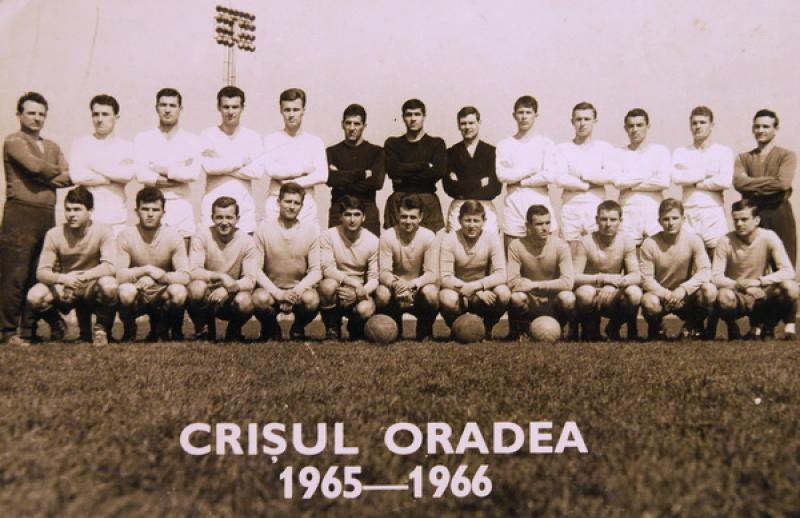
Crișul Oradea (1965–1966)

FC Bihor Oradea continued the football tradition in Oradea after the dissolution of a much greater club, CA Oradea. Founded under the name of Crișul Oradea on 1 April 1958, it has a short activity in the city championship and then in the regional championship. In 1960 the team merged with the footwear factory, Solidaritatea ("Solidarity"), and finishing first in the 1960–61 regional championship, it promoted to the Divizia B after a play-off at Sinaia, on Carpați Stadium.

In the 1961–62 season the club was renamed as ASA Crișul, and finished 11th in the third series of the Divizia B, barely escaping from relegation. The following season, 1962–63, the club finished 1st in the series and promoted for the very first time in its history to the Divizia A. Coach Ladislau Zilahi used the following players: Weichelt – Bucur, Pojoni, Boros, Șchiopu, Donciu, Al. Georgescu, Kun I, Curtu, Osan, Stanciu, Podaru, I. Pop, Bokos, I. Sandu, Manescu, Al. Iacob, Șovoială, Lenalt, Fr. Stilgerlbauer and R. Petschovschi.

Name	Period
Crișul Oradea	1958–1961
ASA Crișul Oradea	1961–1962
Crișul Oradea	1962–1972
FC Bihor Oradea	1972–2002
FC Oradea	2002–2005
FC Bihor Oradea	2005–2016

Crișul played for three seasons in the first league: 1963–64 (7th place), 1964–65 (9th place) and 1965–66 (13th place), then it relegated to the Divizia B where it played for two seasons, 1966–67 (7th place) and 1967–68 (2nd place). In the summer of 1968, it qualified for the promotion play-off, held in Timișoara. There it managed to secure a place in the first league, coach A. Fernbach-Ferenczi, achieved this performance with the following players: Buiuc, Catona – Balogh, Sărac, A. Serfőző, E. Nagy, Popovici, Dărăban, Sudi, Szűcs, Tomeș, A. Nagy, A. Kun II, I. Kun I, I. Harsányi, E. Cociș, Ujlaki and Levai.

After another two seasons in Divizia A, 1968–69 (13th place) and 1969–70 (15th place) it relegated, but returned in the following season, 1970–71, this time under the leadership of coach Ladislau Vlad. The squad was composed of: Catona (Bologan) – Popovici (Sărac), Lukács, Bulc, Balogh, Dărăban, Neşu, Szűcs, A. Nagy, Arnoczky, Șchiopu. Substitutes: Baumgartner, Cocoș, Ceaușu, E. Cociș, Ungur and Moț. But again, after only one season 1971–72 (16th place) relegation to the Divizia B came. The club's highly oscillating behavior imposed a series of organizational measures, being rebuilt as a football club and renamed as Fotbal Club Bihor starting in 1972 the fight for the return in the top flight.

=== Golden Age of FC Bihor (1972–1991) ===
It succeeded to do so (after two second places achieved in the 1972–73 and 1973–74 editions) at the end of the 1974–75 season. Coaches L. Vlad (first half of the championship); R. Cosmoc and Gh. Staicu (second half of the championship) have led to the final victory with the next "11": Albu – E. Nagy, Lukács, Sărac, Popovici – Dărăban, A. Kun II, Florescu – Szűcs, Agud, C.Vlad.

FC Bihor's 1983–84 squad.

FC Bihor's 1989–90 squad.

Next, the team remained at an average level of behavior in the Divizia A, finishing 9th in the 1975–76 and 1976–77 seasons, 14th 1977–78 and 18th 1978–79. The club management during this period was provided by engineer Horea Cosma, as honorary president. Coaches: V. Blujdea, by mid-season 1977–78 being replaced by I. Reinhardt and Al. Muta. Players used: Vidac, Albu – Z. Nagy, Gh. Dumitrescu, Lukács, Popovici, M. Marian, Bigan, Dragoș, Naom, C. Georgescu, Gergely, Petrovici, Svarczman, Lupău, V. Stoica, A. Kun II, Florescu and Fildan.

In the summer of 1979 FC Bihor relegated back to Divizia B where it would be for three editions (1979–1982), always on the brink of promotion: 1979–80 – 2nd and 1980–81 – 4th, thing to be done by the end of the 1981–82 season, this time under the management of Gheorghe Staicu.

Returned to the Divizia A "the Red and Blues" occupied 11th place in the 1982–83 edition and 7th place in the 1983–84, equaling the best performance in the history of the club, with the following organizational formula: Honorary Chairman: H.Cosma; Executive President: Ioan Naom; Organizer of Competitions: Romeo Pașcu; coaches: Gheorghe Dărăban and Attila Kun (in the first part of the season), Attila Kun and Al. Muta (in the second part). Squad: Liliac, Lăzăreanu, Balasz - Dianu, Zare, Gh. Dumitrescu, Nițu, Tămaș, Biszok, Mureșan, Filip, D. Nicolae, Grosu, Georgescu, Ile, Ion Gheorghe, Szűcs, Nedelcu, Rosza, Kiss, Lazăr and Roateș.

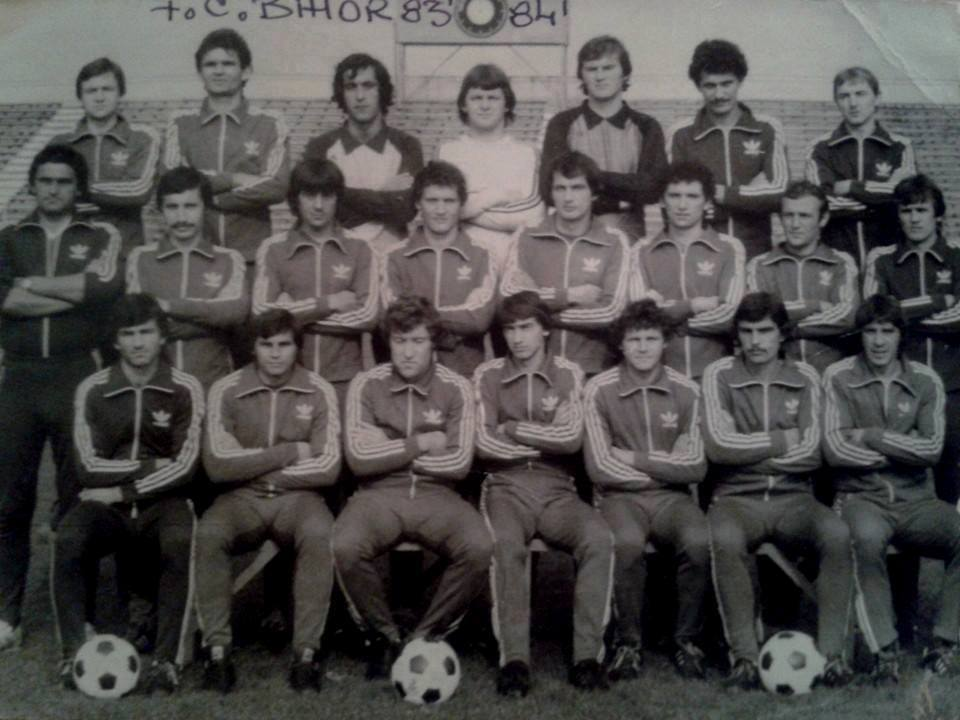
FC Bihor Oradea (1983–1984)

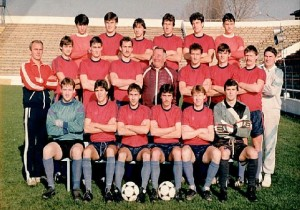
FC Bihor Oradea (1989–1990)

Between 1982 and 1991 was probably the most fruitful period in the history of the club. Bihorenii played 7 seasons in the top flight and only 2 in the second tier of the Romanian football system. With a lot of players that grew up in the red and blue kit such as: Marius Cheregi, Sorin Cigan, Sándor Kulcsár, Ovidiu Lazăr and Viorel Vancea and with some talented imported players such as Marcel Lăzăreanu and Zsolt Muzsnay (from Universitatea Cluj), Anton Weissenbacher (ex-Steaua București and Universitatea Craiova), Mircea Bolba (from Olimpia Satu Mare) or Alexandru Terheș (from FC Brașov) among others, with important coaches: Attila Kun and Paul Popovici (ex players from the 1960s and 1970s), Constantin Teașcă, Viorel Kraus, Viorel Mateianu, Ștefan Coidum or Robert Cosmoc, FC Bihor occupied the following positions: 1984–85 – 10th, 1985–86 – 18th, 1988–89 – 7th, 1989–90 – 10th and 1990–91 – 17th (Divizia A); 1986–87 – 4th and 1987–88 – 1st (Divizia B).

The presence in the top of Divizia A was at the end of 1988–89 season, when the team was ranked 4th, with great chances to accede in the European Cups. On 22 December 1989 radical changes were made the country due to the Romanian Revolution and the fall of communism, events that directed the football from Oradea to other coordinates. However Orădenii finished 7th, equalizing for the second time the best ranking in its history, with coaches Robert Cosmoc, Paul Popovici and D. Drăgan and a squad composed of: Jipa, Șerban - Bălaj, Bucico, Tămaș, Ivan, Vancea, Bereczki, Cheregi, Bruchental, Bolba, Mureșan, Baba, Weissenbacher, Craiu, Lazăr, Biszok, Terheș and Kulcsár.

=== Hard times (1991–2000) ===
Back to Divizia B, with new leadership and several experiments in the technical staff, including the Italian coach Gian Pio del Monaco, FC Bihor had poor results and finished only 5th at the end of the 1991–92 season. In the summer of 1992, football agent Ioan Codoban was hired as the new chairman of the club, the goal being Divizia A promotion, as always for the club from the banks of Crișul Repede river. "The Red and Blues" missed the target by one point, one point behind its bitter rival, UTA Arad.

1993–94 season was disappointing for supporters, who see a mediocre team, which finished 5th, behind teams such as: Maramureș Baia Mare, Unirea Alba Iulia, CSM Reșița, and Tractorul Brașov and Codoban resigned from its position. After the departure of Codoban, the club has entered a very bad pass, financial problems have sprung up everywhere and from the sporting point of view, experienced coach Ștefan Coidum has failed more than a rescue from relegation and a 12th place without glory.

1995–96 season was the most dramatic and closest to disaster season in the history of FC Bihor. With a precarious financial situation and a play more than modest, Bihorenii finished 17th out of 18, with only 31 points and relegated to Divizia C back after 35 years. With a fortune of two players, the rest being sold, FC Bihor had the power to take it from the beginning, with a new president and a new coach, Mircea Fodor and Nicolae Manea. In the squad appeared with much stronger performances players such as: Marius Popa and Cosmin Bărcăuan, players who were part of a very good generation, including other names like: Zeno Bundea or Viorel Domocoș, among others, but the team from Oradea finished only 7th in the fourth series, far away from promotion.

In July 1997 Borsi brothers, businessmen from Oradea, took over the reins of the club and within a few months they managed the revival of the football from Bihor County back in the second division, and even touching the performance of qualification in the last 16 Romanian Cup teams. That performance was obtained with Viorel Abrudan as a coach and with a young and talented squad, formed of players that grew up in the club's academy. Orădenii finished 1st with 23 victories, 6 draws, 5 defeats, 77 goals scored and 28 conceded, 75 points, 15 more than the 2nd place (IS Câmpia Turzii).

In 1998, the club was taken over from the two brothers by another businessman, Viorel Știube, within 2 years the club knocked on the doors of the promotion to Divizia A. After a 1998–99 solid season ended on the 6th place, under coaches: Viorel Abrudan, Marcel Coraș and Gabi Balint, the club was abandoned again and reached the brink of relegation to the third division at the end of 1999–2000 season, when under coaches Gabi Balint and Costel Orac "the Red and Blues" finished on 14th place, not before being rescued from disaster by Bihor County Council.

=== Promotion play-offs (2000–2006) ===
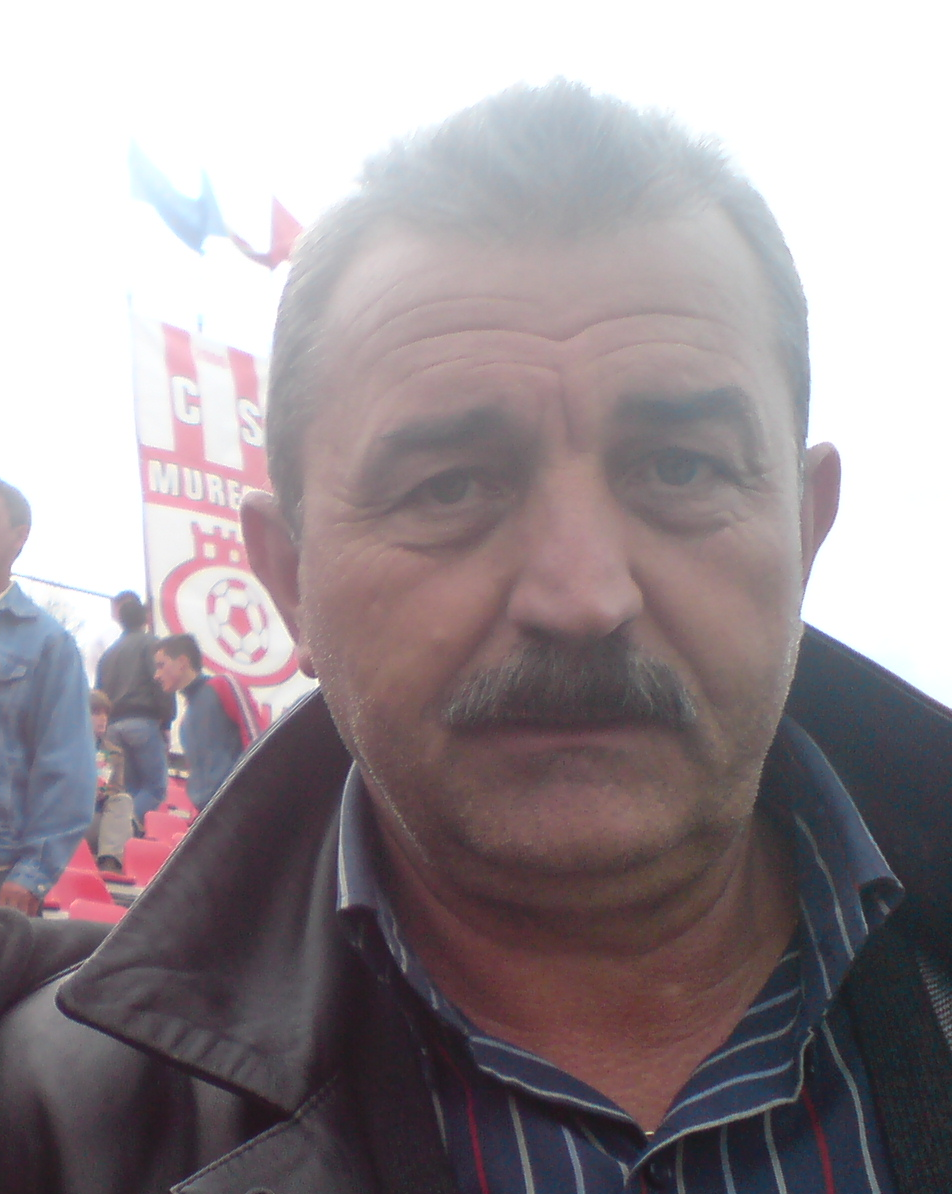
Ionuț Popa managed FC Bihor during 2002-2003 season, and in the first part of the 2003-2004 season.

In the 2000–01 Divizia B season, the club was taken over by Marius Vizer, who started a project to bring in three years FC Bihor in the elite football. In his first season with Vizer as owner, FC Bihor finished 4th after a great second part of the championship succeeded by the players and their coach Ioan Andone. In 2001–02 Divizia B team reached the last podium position after UTA Arad and FC Baia Mare, then in the 2002–03 season FC Bihor has made a step forward, being in the second position after Unirea Alba Iulia.

In those circumstances, Fotbal Club Oradea (as it was called then), coached by Ionuț Popa and chaired by Ioan Lucian, qualified for the Divizia A play-off, a match against Oțelul Galați. After the first round, FC Bihor lost 1–2, in Galați, but they took the revenge on the Municipal Stadium with 20,000 fans in the stands, beating Oțelul Galați with 3–1, the "golden goal" was scored by Bogdan Vrăjitoarea in overtime. Besides, all four goals in the double confrontation with Oțelul were scored by Bogdan Vrăjitoarea.

The squad: Rotaru - Fl.Lazăr, Zaha, Cr.Munteanu - Gado, Naidin (Fele '63), Dumitra (captain), Fl.Călin ('67 Lungan) Sfârlea - Csehi, Vrăjitoarea. Substitutions: Mârne - Dianu, Măuță and Siminic. They could not play because of injuries, Coțan and Keșerü. The game against Oțelul accounted for FC Bihor supporters as the most important game played by FC Bihor at home in its post-revolutionary history.

FC Bihor's 2002–03 squad.

It also was the last game in which the audience was allowed to access in the second stand. The match observer was very close not to allow disputing the match on the stadium because the capacity was exceeded. The stadium announcer even made an appeal to supporters from the second stand to manifest without coming off the places which they occupy because there was a danger of collapse due to weight.

The adventure of FC Oradea in Divizia A was a short-lived one. After a hesitant first part of the season dotted with extraordinary results, like that 1-1 from the first round against Rapid București (the defending champions at that time), but also unexpected defeats as that against FC Brașov, in the last round of the first part. One of the artisans of the promotion, coach Ionuț Popa, was dismissed. It was the "beginning of the end". The club management, from which Marius Vizer withdrew, leaving the responsibility to the local government, decided to put in office the former coach of Steaua București, Dumitru Dumitriu, a move which proved to be unfortunate. In the first game of the second part, FC Oradea not gathered too many points and Dumitriu was sacked. By the end of the season, "the Red and Blues" failed to obtain the points necessary to maintain in Divizia A and were relegated after only one year in the big football.

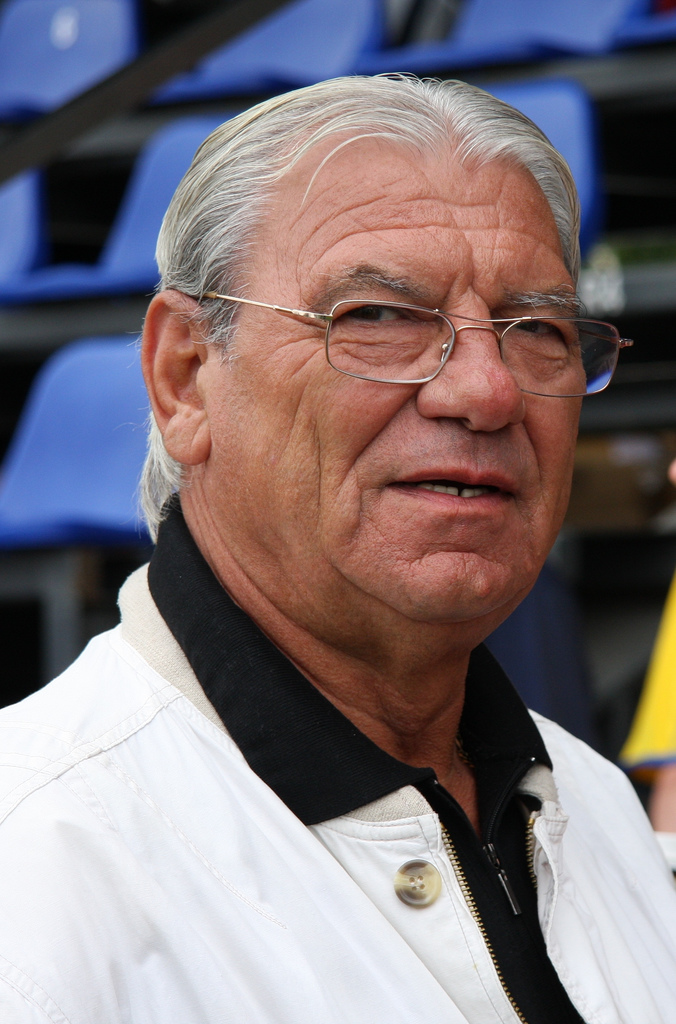
Emerich Jenei technical director of FC Bihor during 2006 promotion play-off

After the return to Divizia B, Orădenii concluded the 2004–05 Divizia B season in 3rd place after Jiul Petroșani and Gaz Metan Mediaș. In the next season, Bihor County had two teams on the first two places: Liberty Salonta, which gave its Divizia A place to UTA Arad and FC Bihor (President, Alexandru Sătmăreanu; Technical director Emerich Jenei; Coach Alexandru Kiss) which disappointed at the promotion play-off, which was played on the Lia Manoliu Stadium.

In the first match FC Bihor lost 0-2 (0–1), against Forex Brașov and cracked too in the last game, score 2-4 (1–4) against Unirea Urziceni, result which promoted Unirea in the first league. The goals were scored for FC Bihor by Fl.Neaga and Foro. In that two games, for FC Bihor played: Mijanović - Oroș, Lupuț, D. Muscă, Lungan - Foro, Gr. Tudor, Strapak, (Szélesi '66), Fl. Neaga - Voiculeț ('46 Lupașcu), Miculescu ('61 V. Grigore), with Forex Brașov, respectively: Mijanović - Oroș, Lupuț ('36 Pătrașcu), D. Muscă, Lungan - Foro, Gr.Tudor, Strapak ('71 Voiculeț), Fl.Neaga - Miculescu ('46 V.Grigore), Széles.

=== A new beginning (2006–2010) ===
After the play-off, president and technical director, Alexandru Sătmăreanu and Emerich Jenei, were dismissed and FC Bihor has set itself as an objective to rebuild the team. President was named Alexandru Toth Ardelean and coaches in the 2006–07 Liga II season were Alexandru Kiss and Florin Farcaș. It was a very difficult championship, FC Bihor managed to save from relegation in the last round after a win, 3–1, away at Auxerre Lugoj.

Even if the seniors had problems, not the same can be said about the republican youth squad (coach Horia Rădulescu) and B youth squad (coach Gheorghe Silaghi) who managed to get the bronze medals in the final of the National Championship. Remarkable was that the second team, FC Bihor II (coach Mircea Fodor), managed to promote to Liga III after a play-off match won, 3–2 against FC Zalău. In the 2007–08 Liga II season, FC Bihor started with a new technical staff composed of Gheorghe Silaghi (manager), Zoltan Vig (assistant manager), Mircea Fodor (assistant manager) and Dorin Mudura (goalkeeping coach). FC Bihor II was taken by Horia Rădulescu, who was helped by Alexandru Gergely. The club was financially supported by Oradea City Council and Bihor County Council.

At the end of the 2007–08 Liga II season FC Bihor has managed to stay away from the relegation places, occupying 8th place, with a record of 13 wins, 8 draws, 13 defeats and 47 points, far away from the objective of the club, which had a squad consisting of valuable players and a budget that could allowed the promotion to the first league. The squad of FC Bihor, managed by Gheorghe Silaghi: Lipitor, Fildan, Bonta- V.Indrieș, Ambruș, Muscă, Lőrincz, Opriceană, Teșan, A.Achim, Andor, Ayza, Floruț, R.Lukács, C.Bucur, Gongolea, S.Achim, Săndulescu, Mihu, Cosma, V.Florea, Predică, Radu, Széles, and L.Todea.

On the same line of the modest progress, FC Bihor occupied 10th place, in the 2008–09 season, when they accumulated 46 points after winning 13 matches, 7 matches had ended in a draw and 14 defeats. Without significant changes in the group of players, but with a new coach in the person of Zoltan Vig and a budget of about 1 million€. The management of FC Bihor was criticized for goal setting, a place from 1 to 10. At the end of the season Bihorenii finished on the 10th place.

The preparing of the next season was made under a new chairman, Gheorghe Alexandrescu, who held the job only from June 2009 to October 2009, after that the destinies of the Red and Blues were taken over by Ioan Lucian. FC Bihor has played in that edition of the championship equally disappointing, finally occupying the 9th place with a line of 10 victories, 12 draws and 10 defeats.

In the 2009–10 season the team was coached by Ioan Petcu, then replaced by Ovidiu Lazăr. In the second part of the season FC Bihor recovered with a new coach, Dan Dobai, and a squad with a lot of players from Liberty Salonta (Petrache, Tegzes, Chiș, Coroian, Sorian, Danci).

In June 2010, between the local administration and businessman Marius Vizer, the chairman of the International Judo Federation and owner of Liberty Football Academy, was signed a two-year partnership on the takeover of the club's management.

=== Premature promotion (2010–2013) ===
With young players coming mostly from Liberty Salonta, FC Bihor managed in the first year of the collaboration with Liberty, a season in the Liga II. Although officially the target wasn't the promotion, the club managed to finish 2nd in the 2010–11 Liga II season, and thus obtain the access to Liga I.

FC Bihor's 2010–11 squad.

The performance was possible after the team from Oradea has fared consistently in the championship, especially in the second part when though have some opponents who have announced from the start that aim to promote, teams like Voința Sibiu, CSMS Iași and Dacia Mioveni, FC Bihor managed to defeat them and conquer important points on their home grounds. From that "red-blue" squad were part players such as: Adrian Mărkuș, Andrei Florean, Sergiu Oltean, Dumitru Muscă, Krisztián Pogacsics, Cătălin Chiș, Alexandru Sorian, Florin Pop or Mihai Deaconescu, among others.

The first eleven that was sent on the pitch in the last game, a 4–2 win, against Gaz Metan CFR Craiova: Pogacsics - Oltean, Muscă, Deaconescu, Lupu - Chiș, M.Popa, Selagea - Florean, Cigan, Bîrză. In the second half, entered: Sorian, Petrache and Fl. Pop; manager: Gheorghe Ghiț. Three of the four goals in that game from the last round of the championship were scored by Cătălin Chiș and the other one by Ciprian Selagea.

The joy of the promotion obtained on the football pitch, which was then celebrated in front of the Oradea City Hall by hundreds of fans, city and county officials, it was not a long-term one. A decision of the Romanian Football Federation, which has tightened the criteria for licensing, not made possible the evolution of FC Bihor in the following Liga I season, because of the historic debts accumulated by the former management of the club.

It was a controversial decision of the Licensing Commission of the FRF, marking the first time when a team that has obtained the right to play in Liga I was relegated due to the financial situation. Subsequently, after the economic crisis appeared, the licensing criteria have become milder.

However, Orădenii were forced to start over again from Liga II in the next season. But although they have proposed to promote, the target could not be obtained on the ground. The disappointment caused by the promotion ban was quite high and affected the morale of players who had an average age rather low. Thus, FC Bihor finished the 2011–12 season only 8th with 44 points, as a result of 12 wins, 8 draws and 10 defeats.

Meanwhile, the partnership with businessman Marius Vizer and his company, Liberty, was extended, the objective of promotion was more pressing than ever. Unfortunately, although there were big ambitions, the first part of the 2012–13 season did not bring the expected results and the team was far from the objective. Coach Claudiu Niculescu was dismissed and Marian Pană was hired instead and five valuable players have signed contracts with FC Bihor: Florin Lazăr, Ciprian Vasilache, Ovidiu Mihalache, Cristian Bud and Daniel Vădrariu. In the second part of the season it has been tried an evolution without mistake, a journey of force to return on the top places, but unfortunately, FC Bihor ranked only 7th with 33 points.

=== Insolvency and bankruptcy (2013–2016) ===
The disappointment caused by the failure of promotion, but also the fact that he was elected the president of SportAccord, determined businessman Marius Vizer not to extend the partnership with Oradea and Bihor County authorities. After the separation of Liberty and supported only by the Oradea City Council and Bihor County Council, the club tried to rebuild the team, relying only on local players and young players from their own academy.

In 2009 the new chairman of FC Bihor at that time, Ioan Lucian, discovered large debts and introduced the club into insolvency to avoid bankruptcy. Then, during the partnership with Liberty the insolvency plan has been respected and 14 installments have been paid. After the withdrawal of Liberty, no more installments were paid and the bankruptcy was delayed several times.

Later, during the reconstruction of the team and due to the severe financial situation, a collaboration was possible with Luceafărul Felix, the second team of Bihor County, which decided to withdraw from Liga II and give their best players to FC Bihor. The team was rebuilt under Gheorghe Ghiț, who managed the 2011 promotion.

In the first part of the season the results were poor and Gheorghe Ghiț was replaced by Alexandru Pelici, but results remained unchanged and FC Bihor ended in the 2013–14 Liga II season on 9th place, just above the relegation zone. In the summer of 2014 Oradea City Council, one of the owners of the club, withdrew and left the team in a tough situation. As a result of this action, the president of the club, Șerban Morcan refused to renew his contract with FC Bihor. At that time, the club was heading to dissolution. However, the other owner, Bihor County Council tried to reorganize the team and appointed a new chairman, in the person of Viorel Nemeș.

However, the situation worsened after Bihor County Council faced legal problems related to the absence of the other owner from the club's organization chart. The club lived entire season with money received from the transfers of players and sponsorships, but that money was not enough to pay the wages. Because of the financial situation and the lack of results, coach Alexandru Pelici has resigned and was replaced by his assistant, Călin Cheregi.

In March 2015, president Viorel Nemeș has resigned due to the poor financial situation. Mircea Fodor, former player and coach of FC Bihor, was appointed as the new chairman, he was the only one who has assumed the disastrous situation. Fodor was also the chairman who saved FC Bihor's boat in 1996, at the last critical moment, but this time chances of success seemed to be low. Then, in April, Călin Cheregi has resigned too and was replaced by Gheorghe Silaghi, former coach of FC Bihor II. The 2014–15 season was a real disaster for FC Bihor, which ended in the relegation zone, on 10th place, being saved only by the dissolution of Olt Slatina and Fortuna Poiana Câmpina.

In the summer of 2015, a new sponsor was brought to the club, in the person of Mihai Giurgiu, the owner of a football academy from Cluj-Napoca. He assumed all the club's debts estimated at 1 million€, but after a short period he gave up to finance the team. In the 2015–16 Liga II season, the team was always threatened with bankruptcy and exclusion from championship and only the efforts made by Mircea Fodor and the players, who were not paid for several months, kept the team alive. In October Gheorghe Silaghi has resigned and was replaced by Dan Mănăilă, the only coach who agreed to work for free. In January 2016, FC Bihor was kicked out from its headquarters and coach Dan Mănăilă chose to coach a Liga IV side instead of FC Bihor.

Finally, after a year in which it lived from day to day, FC Bihor has been declared bankrupt on 12 January 2016.

After the declaration of bankruptcy, CSM Oradea announced the establishment of the football department and took the youth academy of FC Bihor, in an attempt to save what was still possible.

== Youth program ==
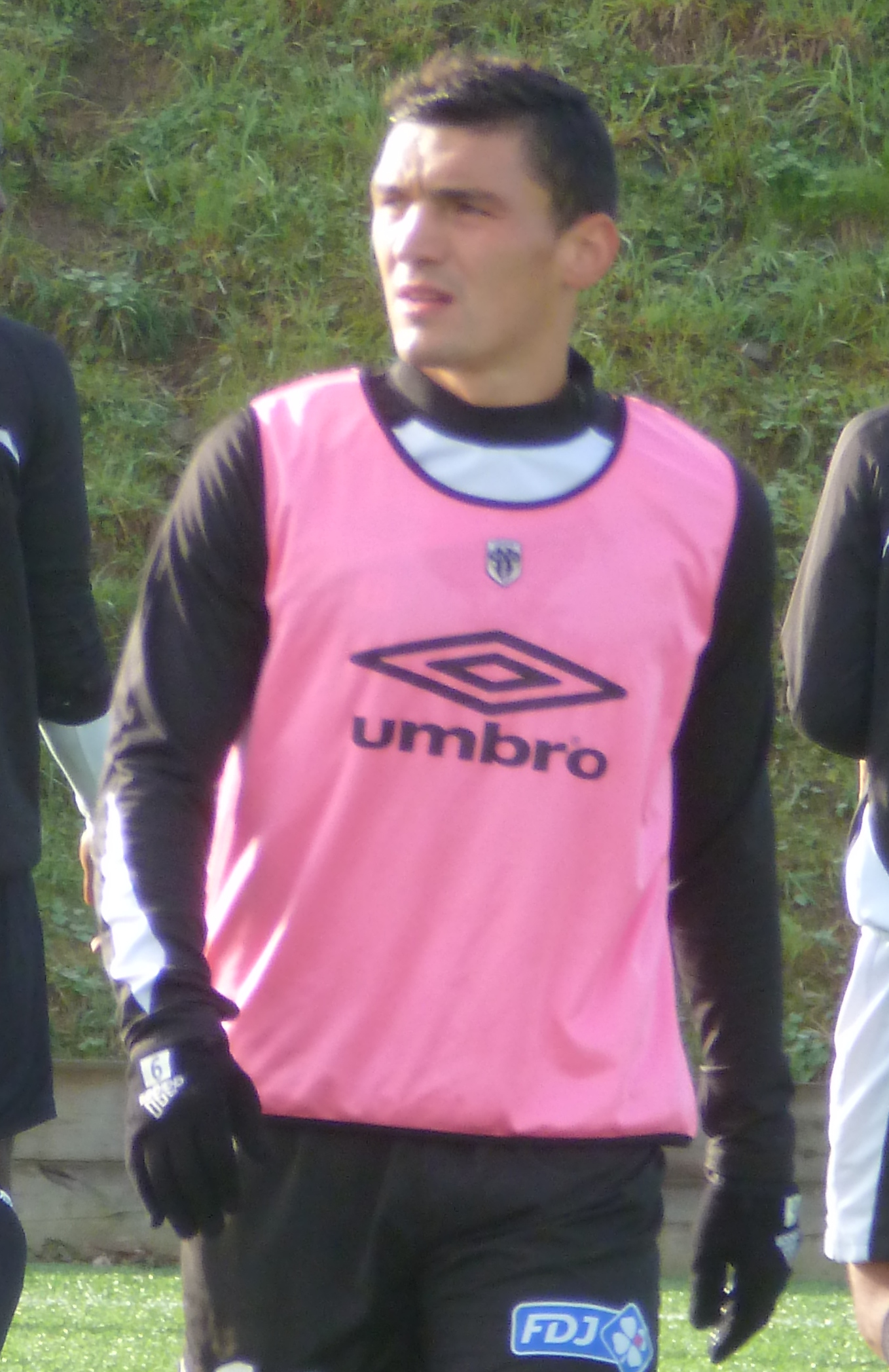
Claudiu Keșerü, one of the most valuable players who was at FC Bihor youth academy.

Youth academy of FC Bihor gave important names for the Romanian and international football such as: Sebastian Achim, Cosmin Bărcăuan, Zeno Bundea, Cristian Cigan, Viorel Domocoș, Ioan Filip, Ramses Gado, Ovidiu Hoban, Claudiu Keșerü, Attila Kun, Ovidiu Lazăr, Raymond Lukacs, Marius Popa, Daniel Usvat or Ion Zare. After the declaration of bankruptcy, CSM Oradea announced the establishment of the football department and took the youth academy of FC Bihor.

== Grounds ==
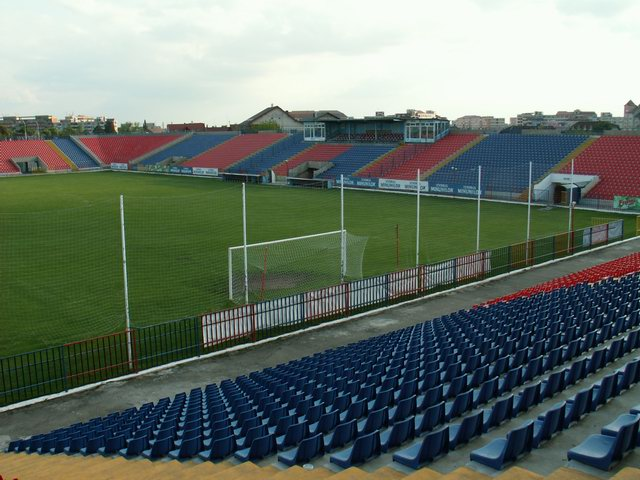
Stadionul Iuliu Bodola

The club played its home matches on Stadionul Iuliu Bodola from Oradea. The second team and youth teams played their matches on Stadionul Motorul, also located in Oradea.

== Support ==
FC Bihor has many supporters in Oradea and especially in Bihor County. The ultras group of FC Bihor Oradea it is known as Peluza Nord Oradea (PNO). FC Bihor supporters consider Olimpia Satu Mare supporters to be their allies, fans of both teams had the opportunity to support the other during matches.

=== Rivalries ===
The most important rivalry for FC Bihor is the one against UTA Arad. This derby it is known as The West Derby, name used also for other two rivalries: UTA Arad Vs. Politehnica Timișoara and FC Bihor Oradea Vs. Politehnica Timișoara. Apart from these two rivalries, against UTA Arad and Politehnica Timișoara, FC Bihor have also a rivalry against FCM Baia Mare and a local one against Luceafărul Oradea, also known as Oradea Derby.

== Seasons ==
1958–59 – Campionatul Orășenesc 1st place; 1959–60 – Campionatul Regional 4th place; 1960–61 – Campionatul Regional 1st place, promoted to Divizia B, won the promotion play-off played at Sinaia; 1961–62 – Divizia B 11th place, Seria III; 1962–63 – Divizia B 1st place, Seria II, promoted to Divizia A; 1963–64 – Divizia A 7th place; 1964–65 – Divizia A 9th place; 1965–66 – Divizia A 13th place, relegated to Divizia B; 1966–67 – Divizia B 7th place, Seria II; 1967–68 – Divizia B 2nd place, Seria II, promoted to Divizia A, won the promotion play-off played at Timișoara; 1968–69 – Divizia A 10th place; 1969–70 – Divizia A 15th place, relegated to Divizia B; 1970–71 – Divizia B 1st place, Seria II, promoted to Divizia A; 1971–72 – Divizia A 16th place, relegated to Divizia B; 1972–73 – Divizia B 2nd place, Seria II; 1973–74 – Divizia B 2nd place, Seria III; 1974–75 – Divizia B 1st place, Seria III, promoted to Divizia A	1975–76 – Divizia A 9th place; 1976–77 – Divizia A 9th place; 1977–78 – Divizia A 14th place; 1978–79 – Divizia A 18th place, relegated to Divizia B; 1979–80 – Divizia B 2nd place, Seria III; 1980–81 – Divizia B 4th place, Seria III; 1981–82 – Divizia B 1st place, Seria III, promoted to Divizia A; 1982–83 – Divizia A 11th place; 1983–84 – Divizia A 7th place; 1984–85 – Divizia A 10th place; 1985–86 – Divizia A 18th place, relegated to Divizia B; 1986–87 – Divizia B 4th place, Seria III	1987–88 – Divizia B 1st place, Seria III, promoted to Divizia A; 1988–89 – Divizia A 7th place; 1989–90 – Divizia A 10th place; 1990–91 – Divizia A 17th place, relegated to Divizia B; 1991–92 – Divizia B 5th place, Seria II; 1992–93 – Divizia B 2nd place, Seria II; 1993–94 – Divizia B 5th place, Seria II; 1994–95 – Divizia B 12th place, Seria II; 1995–96 – Divizia B 17th place, Seria II, relegated to Divizia C; 1996–97 – Divizia C 7th place, Seria IV; 1997–98 – Divizia C 1st place, Seria IV, promoted to Divizia B	1998–99 – Divizia B 6th place, Seria II; 1999–00 – Divizia B 14th place, Seria II; 2000–01 – Divizia B 4th place, Seria II; 2001–02 – Divizia B 3rd place, Seria II; 2002–03 – Divizia B 2nd place, Seria II, promoted to Divizia A, won the promotion play-off against Oțelul Galați; 2003–04 – Divizia A 16th place, relegated to Divizia B; 2004–05 – Divizia B 3rd place, Seria III; 2005–06 – Divizia B 2nd place, Seria III, lost the promotion play-off against Unirea Urziceni and Forex Brașov; 2006–07 – Liga II 13th place, Seria II; 2007–08 – Liga II 8th place, Seria II; 2008–09 – Liga II 10th place, Seria II; 2009–10 – Liga II 9th place, Seria II; 2010–11 – Liga II 2nd place, Seria II, promoted to Liga I but they were denied a licence for Liga I because of the debts; 2011–12 – Liga II 8th place, Seria II; 2012–13 – Liga II 7th place, Seria II; 2013–14 – Liga II 9th place, Seria II; 2014–15 – Liga II 10th place, Seria II; 2015–16 – Liga II 13th place, Seria II, relegated to Liga III, then the club was dissolved.

== Historical squads ==
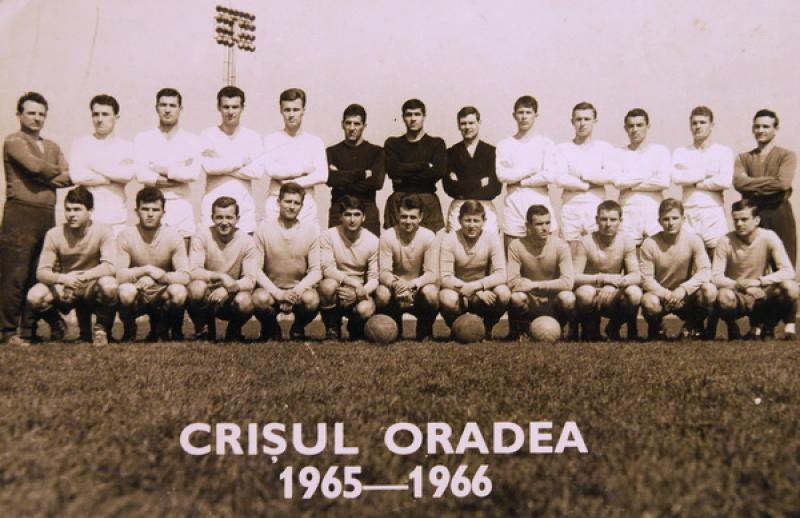
1965–1966

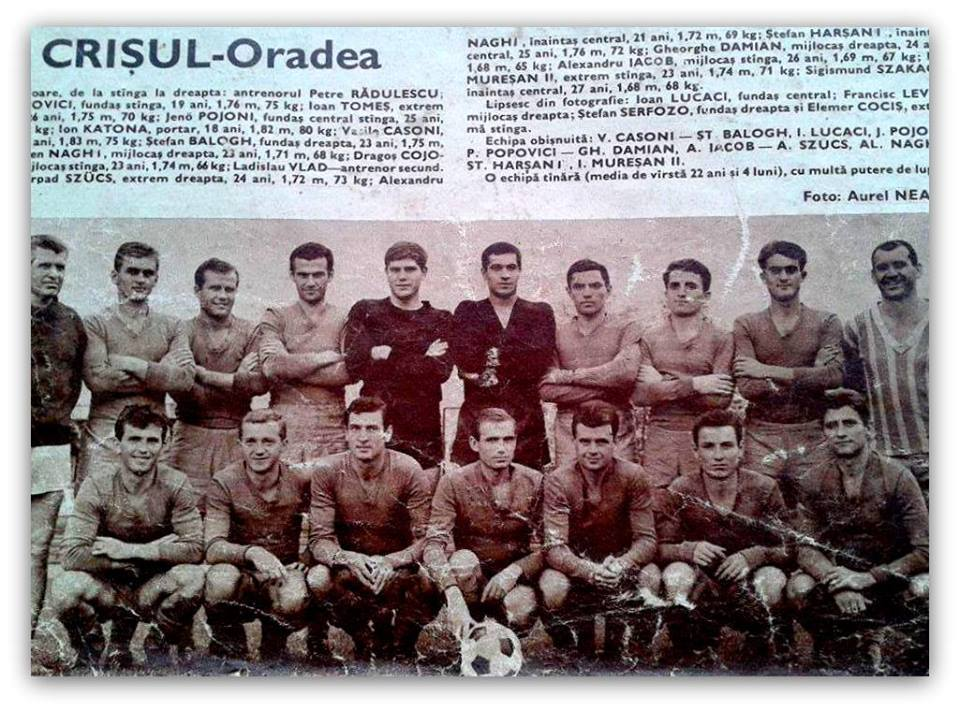
1966–1967

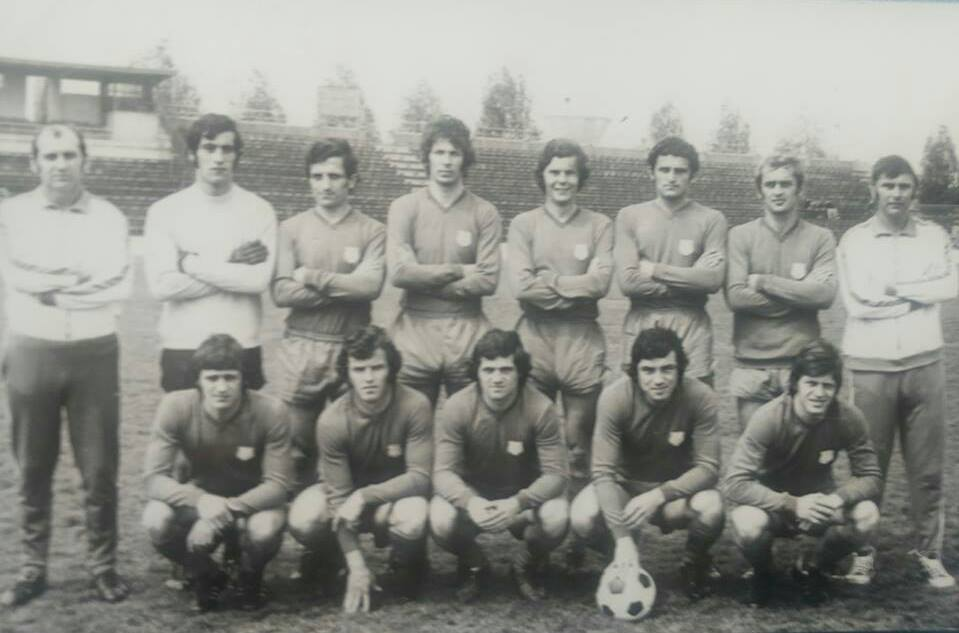
1974–1975

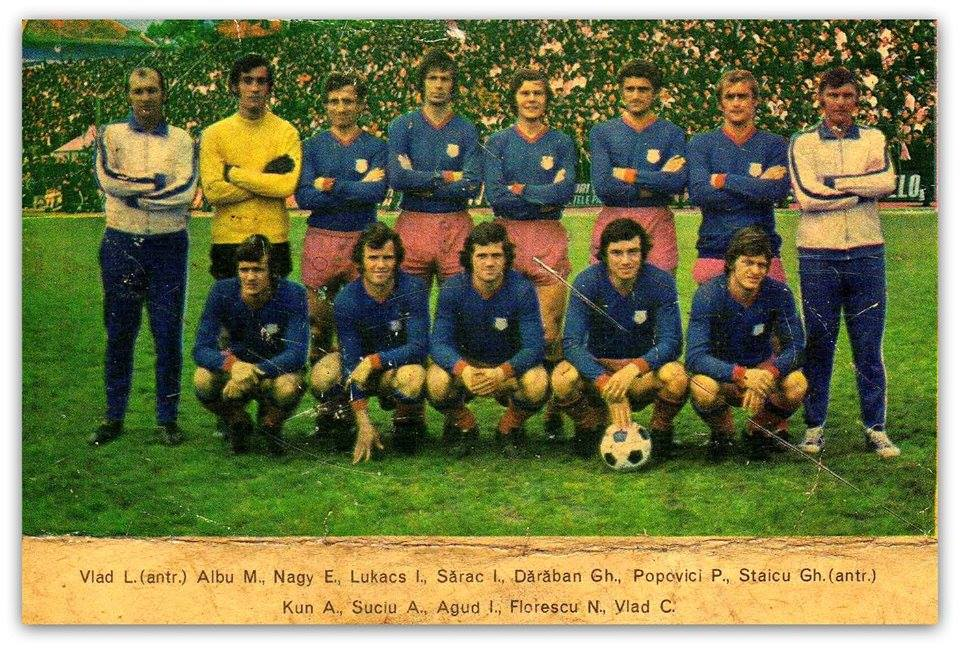
1975–1976

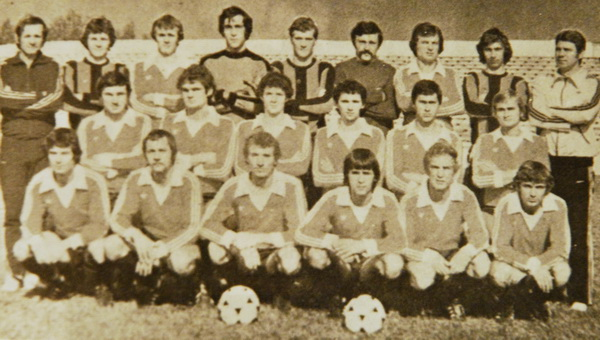
1978–1979

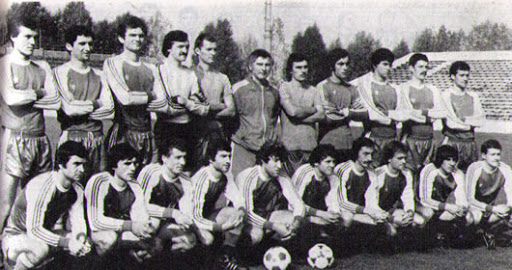
1981–1982

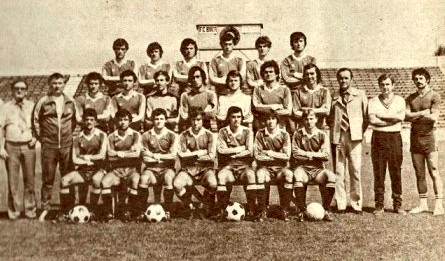
1982–1983

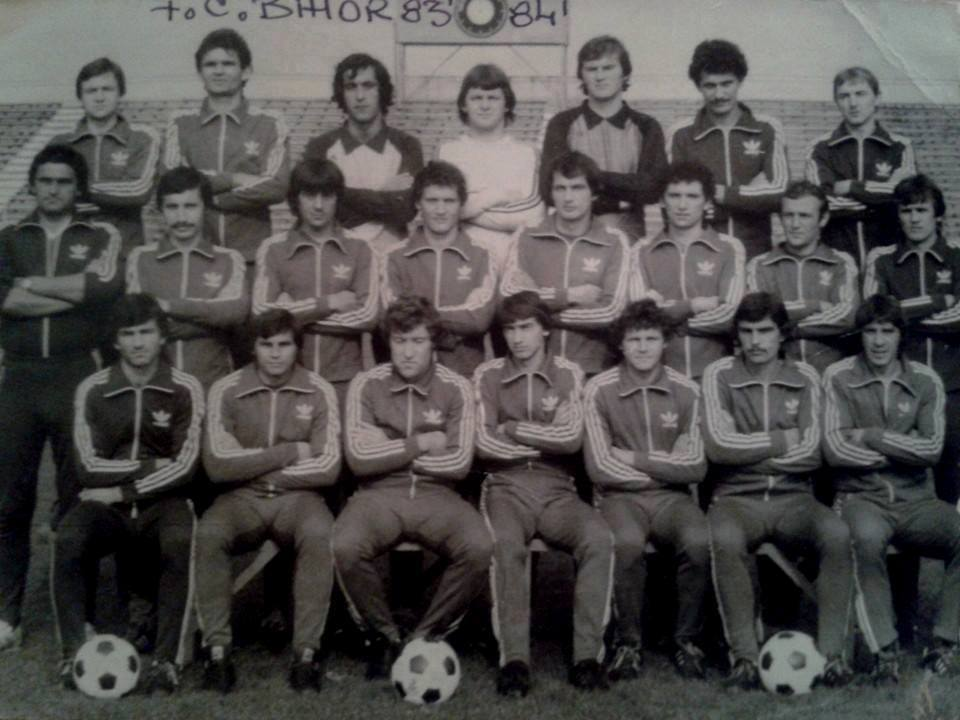
1983–1984

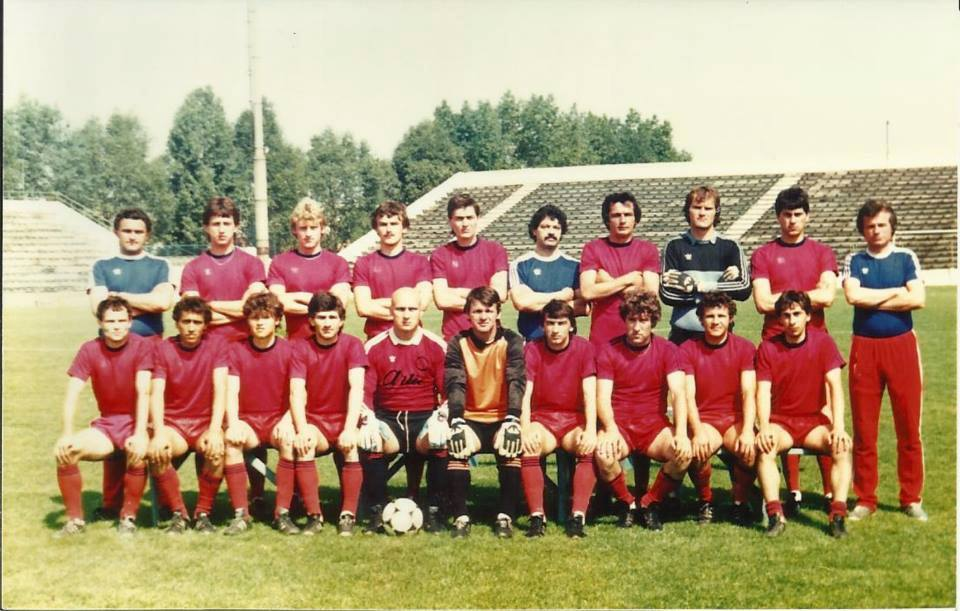
1985–1986

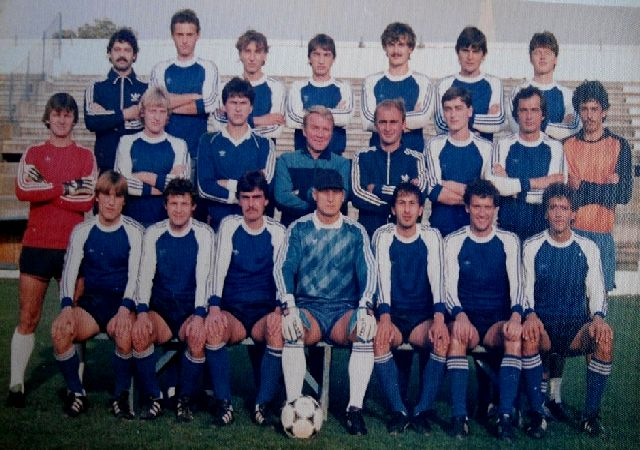
1986–1987

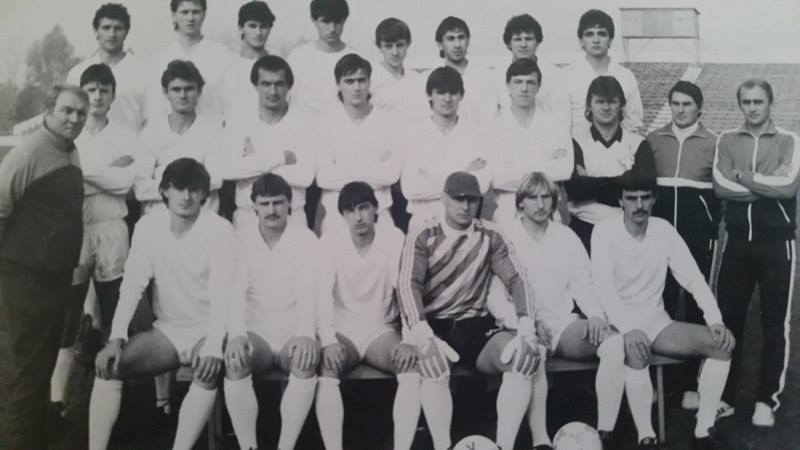
1988–1989

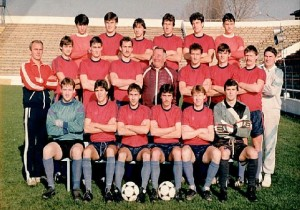
1989–1990

== Honours ==
=== Leagues ===
- Liga II
  - Winners (5): 1962–63, 1970–71, 1974–75, 1981–82, 1987–88
  - Runners-up (8): 1967–68, 1972–73, 1973–74, 1979–80, 1992–93, 2002–03, 2005–06, 2010–11
- Liga III
  - Winners (1): 1997–98

=== Friendly ===
- Norcia Winter Cup Italy
  - Winners (1): 2004
  - Runners-up (1): 2005

=== Other performances ===
- Appearances in Liga I: 18
- Best finish in Liga I: 7th place in the 1963–1964, 1983–84 and 1988–89 seasons.
- Place 24 of 98 teams in the Liga I All-time table

== Shirt sponsors and manufacturers ==
Period	Kit manufacturer	Period	Shirt partner
2002–2005	(Italy) Erreà	2003–2005	None
2005–2007	(Italy) Lotto	2005–2007	None
2007–2009	(United States) Nike	2007–2009	None
2009–2010	(Italy) Sportika	2009–2011	(Romania) AdePlast
2010–2011	(Italy) Erreà	2009–2011	(Romania) AdePlast
2011–2016	(Spain) Joma	2011–2013	(Romania) OK Liberty

== Player statistics ==
=== All-time most appearances ===
Rank	Player	Period	Caps
1	(Romania) Cornel Georgescu	1974–89	347
2	(Romania) Attila Kun	1966–71, 1974–83	309
2	(Romania) Árpád Szűcs	1965–78	309
4	(Romania) János Lukács	1965–78	280
5	(Romania) Eugen Nagy	1964–77	275
6	(Romania) Nicolae Florescu	1972–83	219
7	(Romania) Ovidiu Lazăr	1983–90, 1991–92, 1994–95	218
8	(Romania) Vladimir Tămaș	1985–95	216
9	(Romania) Alexandru Nagy	1964–72, 1975–77	193
10	(Romania) Paul Popovici	1964–70, 1974–78	184

=== All-time top scorers ===
Rank	Player	Period	Goals
1	(Romania) Attila Kun	1966–71, 1974–83	103
2	(Romania) Cornel Georgescu	1974–89	96
3	(Romania) Ovidiu Lazăr	1983–90, 1991–92, 1994–95	79
4	(Romania) Petre Grosu	1981–86	52
5	(Romania) Raymond Lukács	2004–10, 2013–15	49
6	(Romania) Alexandru Gergely	1975–80	45
7	(Hungary) Zoltán Csehi	2001–03	32
8	(Romania) Árpád Szűcs	1964–73, 1974–80	31
9	(Romania) Adrian Mărkuș	2010–13	29
10	(Romania) Nicolae Florescu	1972–83	26

- Only players for which information is available are taken into consideration.

== Notable former players ==
The footballers enlisted below have had international cap(s) for their respective countries at junior and/or senior level and/or more than 100 caps for FC Bihor Oradea.

Romania

- (Romania) Cristian Albeanu
- (Romania) Cosmin Bărcăuan
- (Romania) Ovidiu Bic
- (Romania) Zeno Bundea
- (Romania) Marius Cheregi
- (Romania) Cristian Cigan
- (Romania) Sorin Cigan
- (Romania) Andrei Coroian
- (Romania) Zoltan Crișan
- (Romania) Ion Dumitra
- (Romania) Andrei Florean
- (Romania) Nicolae Florescu
- (Romania) Ramses Gado
- (Romania) Cornel Georgescu
- (Romania) Alexandru Gergely
- (Romania) Adrian Gongolea
- (Romania) Petre Grosu
- (Romania) Sergiu Hanca
- (Romania) Ovidiu Hoban
- (Romania) Ion Ionescu
- (Romania) Claudiu Keșerü
- (Romania) Sándor Kulcsár
- (Romania) Attila Kun

Greece

- (Greece) Giorgos Zindros

Macedonia

- (North Macedonia) Jurica Siljanoski

Ukraine

- (Ukraine) Serhiy Kuznetsov

Romania

- (Romania) Florin Lazăr
- (Romania) Ovidiu Lazăr
- (Romania) Marcel Lăzăreanu
- (Romania) Gheorghe Liliac
- (Romania) János Lukács
- (Romania) Raymond Lukács
- (Romania) Mihai Lungan
- (Romania) Cornel Lupău
- (Romania) Adrian Mărkuș
- (Romania) Dorin Mihuț
- (Romania) Cristian Munteanu
- (Romania) Zsolt Muzsnay
- (Romania) Alexandru Nagy
- (Romania) Eugen Nagy
- (Romania) Ioan Naom
- (Romania) Cătălin Necula

Romania

- (Romania) Leonida Nedelcu
- (Romania) Doru Nicolae
- (Romania) Ion Nițu
- (Romania) Cristian Oroș
- (Romania) Ștefan Petcu
- (Romania) Marius Popa
- (Romania) Paul Popovici
- (Romania) George Pușcaș
- (Romania) Iosif Rotariu
- (Romania) Gabriel Rotaru
- (Romania) Alexandru Sătmăreanu
- (Romania) Lajos Sătmăreanu
- (Romania) Petru Șchiopu
- (Romania) Ciprian Selagea
- (Romania) Sebastian Sfârlea
- (Romania) Alexandru Sorian
- (Romania) Árpád Szűcs
- (Romania) Alexandru Terheș
- (Romania) Florin Țîrcă
- (Romania) Bogdan Vrăjitoarea
- (Romania) Anton Weissenbacher
- (Romania) Ion Zare
- (Romania) Iosif Vigu

== Former managers ==
- (Romania) Ladislau Zilahi (1962–1963)
- (Romania) Constantin Voroncovschi (1963–1964)
- (Romania) Ladislau Zilahi (1964–1966)
- (Romania) Gusztáv Juhász (1966–1967)
- (Romania) Anton Fernbach-Ferenczi (1967–1969)
- (Romania) Ladislau Vlad (1969–1971)
- (Romania) Ștefan Coidum (1971–1972)
- (Romania) Anton Fernbach-Ferenczi (1972–1974)
- (Romania) Ladislau Vlad (1974)
- (Romania) Robert Cosmoc (1975)
- (Romania) Gheorghe Staicu (1975)
- (Romania) Robert Cosmoc (1976–1977)
- (Romania) Ioan Reinhardt (1977–1978)
- (Romania) Emerich Jenei (1978–1980)
- (Romania) Gheorghe Staicu (1981–1983)
- (Romania) Attila Kun (1983)
- (Romania) Attila Kun (1984)
- (Romania) Victor Stănculescu (1985)
- (Romania) Constantin Teașcă (1985)
- (Romania) Viorel Kraus (1985–1986)
- (Romania) Viorel Mateianu (1986)
- (Romania) Ștefan Coidum (1987–1988)
- (Romania) Viorel Mateianu (1988)
- (Romania) Paul Popovici (1988–1989)
- (Romania) Robert Cosmoc (1989–1990)
- (Romania) Paul Popovici (1990)
- (Romania) Alexandru Muta (1990–1991)
- (Romania) Ștefan Coidum (1994–1995)
- (Romania) Árpád Szűcs (1996)
- (Romania) Nicolae Manea (1996–1997)
- (Romania) Gavril Balint (1998–1999)
- (Romania) Costel Orac (1999–2000)
- (Romania) Alexandru Muta (2000)
- (Romania) Ioan Andone (2000–2001)
- (Hungary) Lajos Détári (2001)
- (Romania) Alexandru Moldovan (2001–2002)
- (Romania) Marin Ion (2002)
- (Romania) Ionuț Popa (2002–2003)
- (Romania) Dumitru Dumitriu (2003–2004)
- (Romania) Marian Bondrea (2004–2005)
- (Romania) Zsolt Muzsnay (2005)
- (Romania) Alin Artimon (2005)
- (Romania) Marin Ion (2005–2006)
- (Romania) Ovidiu Lazăr (2009)
- (Romania) Ioan Petcu (2009)
- (Romania) Claudiu Niculescu (2012)
- (Romania) Iosif Rotariu (2012)
- (Romania) Marian Pană (2013)
- (Romania) Alexandru Pelici (2013–2014)
