= Zsolt Muzsnay =

Romanian footballer

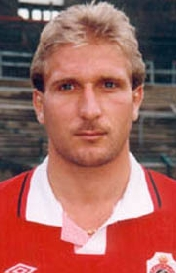
- Muzsnay with Antwerp in 1991

Personal information
- Date of birth: 20 June 1965 (age 61)
- Place of birth: Cluj-Napoca, Romania
- Height: 1.78 m (5 ft 10 in)
- Position: Midfielder

Youth career
- –1983: Universitatea Cluj
- 1982–1983: → Luceafărul București (loan)

Senior career*
Years	Team	Apps	(Gls)
1983–1988	Universitatea Cluj	127	(17)
1988–1989	Bihor Oradea	31	(9)
1989–1990	Steaua București	25	(1)
1990–1991	Videoton	23	(5)
1991–1995	Antwerp	15	(0)
1992–1993	→ Videoton (loan)	14	(0)
1995	→ Fehérvár (loan)	5	(0)
1995–1999	Bihor Oradea	5	(0)
Total		245	(32)

International career
1984–1990	Romania	6	(0)

Managerial career
- 2000: Bihor Oradea
- 2003–2004: FC Oradea (assistant)
- 2004: FC Oradea (caretaker)
- 2005: FC Oradea
- 2006–2007: CFR Cluj (assistant)
- 2011–2014: Kinder Paleu
- 2014–2015: Luceafărul Oradea
- 2016: Șoimii Pâncota
- 2017: Crișul Chișineu-Criș
- 2018–2019: Unirea Valea lui Mihai
- 2019–2024: Szeged-Csanád U17
- * Club domestic league appearances and goals

Zsolt Muzsnay (born 20 June 1965) is a Romanian professional football manager and former player.

== Career ==
Muzsnay made six appearances for the Romania national team, and was named to the squad for the 1990 FIFA World Cup, before retiring in 1999.

He was also the head coach of Bihor Oradea in 2004.

Following his playing career, Muzsnay became the assistant coach of CFR Cluj.

== Career statistics ==
=== International ===
Appearances and goals by national team and year
National team	Year	Apps	Goals
Romania	1984	1	0
Romania	1985	0	0
Romania	1986	1	0
Romania	1987	1	0
Romania	1988	0	0
Romania	1989	1	0
Romania	1990	2	0
Total		6	0

== Honours ==
=== Player ===
Universitatea Cluj

- Divizia B: 1984–85

Steaua București

- Cupa României runner-up: 1989–90
- European Cup runner-up: 1988–89

Antwerp

- Belgian Cup: 1991–92

Bihor Oradea

- Divizia C: 1997–98

=== Coach ===
Kinder Paleu

- Liga IV – Bihor County: 2012–13

Luceafărul Oradea

- Liga IV – Bihor County: 2014–15
