= Sergiu Oltean =

Romanian footballer

Personal information
- Full name: Sergiu Adrian Oltean
- Date of birth: 24 July 1987 (age 39)
- Place of birth: Salonta, Romania
- Height: 1.85 m (6 ft 1 in)
- Position: Centre back

Team information
- Current team: Lotus Băile Felix
- Number: 16

Senior career*
Years	Team	Apps	(Gls)
2005–2010	Liberty Salonta	50	(12)
2010–2013	Bihor Oradea	57	(15)
2013	Brașov	23	(1)
2013–2015	Botoșani	25	(0)
2015–2016	Baia Mare	30	(1)
2016–2017	Cigánd	30	(0)
2017–2018	Kisvárda	28	(6)
2018–2021	Kazincbarcika	99	(8)
2021–2022	Füzesgyarmat	56	(4)
2023–	Lotus Băile Felix	25	(1)
- * Club domestic league appearances and goals as of 08:44, 22 June 2024 (UTC)

Sergiu Adrian Oltean (born 24 July 1987) is a Romanian footballer who plays as a centre-back for Liga III club Lotus Băile Felix. In his career, Oltean also played for teams such as: Liberty Salonta, Bihor Oradea, FC Brașov, FC Botoșani or Kisvárda FC, among others.
