= András Biszok =

Romanian footballer (born 1958)

Personal information
- Date of birth: 20 April 1958 (age 68)
- Place of birth: Sfântu Gheorghe, Romania
- Height: 1.80 m (5 ft 11 in)
- Position: Defender

Senior career*
| Years | Team | Apps | (Gls) |
| 1978–1981 | Oltul Sfântu Gheorghe | | |
| 1981–1991 | Bihor Oradea | 283 | (9) |
| Total | | 283 | (9) |
- * Club domestic league appearances and goals as of 20:51, 8 January 2025 (UTC)

András Biszok (born 20 April 1958) is a Romanian former professional footballer who played as a defender. Biszok grew up in the youth center of Oltul Sfântu Gheorghe, team for which he made its Divizia B debut in 1977. In 1981 he was transferred to FC Bihor Oradea team for which he will play the next 10 years, in over 280 matches (192 matches in the Divizia A), being the third most capped footballer in the history of the red and blues.

== Honours ==
Bihor Oradea

- Divizia B: 1981–82, 1987–88
