= Petre Grosu =

Romanian footballer

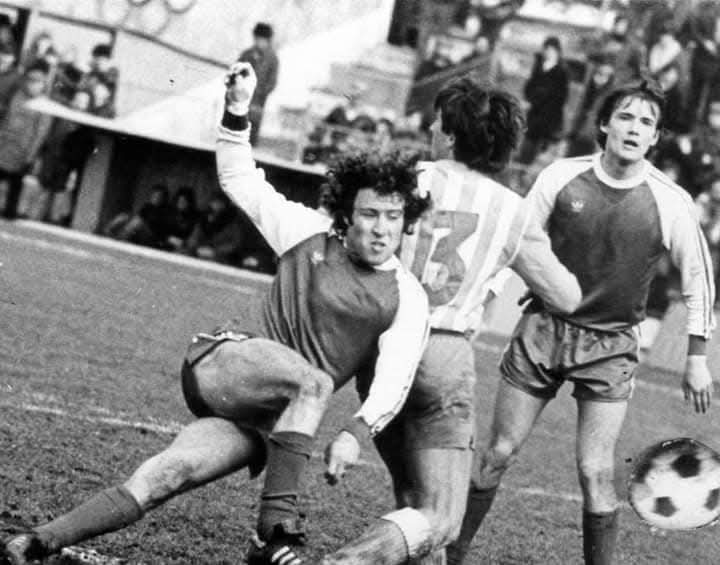
- Petre Grosu playing for FC Bihor in 1982.

Personal information
- Date of birth: 27 November 1955 (age 70)
- Place of birth: Bucharest, Romania
- Height: 1.75 m (5 ft 9 in)
- Positions: Midfielder; forward

Youth career
- 1967–1973: ȘS 2 București

Senior career*
Years	Team	Apps	(Gls)
1973–1979	Sportul Studențesc	94	(18)
1979	Mecanică Fină București		
1980	Rapid București		(5)
1981–1985	Bihor Oradea	118	(77)
1985	Petrolul Ploiești	7	(0)
1986	Bihor Oradea	16	(4)
1986–1988	Automatica București		(13)
1988–1989	Drobeta-Turnu Severin	2	(2)
Total		237	(119)

International career
1975	Romania U-21	3	(0)

Managerial career
- 1986–1988: Automatica București
- 1989–1990: Avântul Reghin
- 1991: CS Botoșani
- 2006: ACU Arad
- 2010: Viitorul Popești
- 2011: CS Mădăras
- 2011: Metalul Frăsinet
- 2012: Național Sebiș
- * Club domestic league appearances and goals as of 15 August 2017

Petre Grosu (born 27 November 1955) is a Romanian former professional footballer who played as a midfielder or as a forward. He started his professional career at Sportul Studențesc, but he would have known full glory at Bihor Oradea being the top scorer of the team in the 1981–82 Divizia B season, also succeeding in promoting with Bihor Oradea. The best performance would come at the end of the 1982–83 Divizia A season when Grosu has become the top scorer of the Divizia A, the first and the last in the history of FC Bihor. With this performance, he secured a place in the Bihor Oradea hall of fame and a well-established place in the memory of supporters.
