= Ioan Sărac =

Romanian footballer (1949–2021)

Personal information
- Date of birth: 19 May 1949
- Place of birth: Oradea, Romania
- Date of death: 9 November 2021 (aged 72)
- Place of death: Oradea, Romania
- Position: Defender

Youth career
- Bihor Oradea

Senior career*
Years	Team	Apps	(Gls)
1967–1976	Bihor Oradea	185	(2)
1976–1980	Oltul Sfântu Gheorghe		
Total		185	(2)

Managerial career
- 1980–1991: Bihor Oradea (youth center)
- 1991–1992: Bihor Oradea (assistant)
- * Club domestic league appearances and goals as of 13:56, 19 January 2025 (UTC)

Ioan Sărac (19 May 1949 – 9 November 2021) was a Romanian professional footballer, football manager and PE teacher. Sărac started to play for FC Bihor Oradea in 1967, when the team was still known under the name of Crișul Oradea. In almost a decade spent in the red and blue jersey, Sărac played 185 matches and scored 2 goals (71 matches and 0 goals in the top-flight). He left FC Bihor in 1976, but continued to play at the level of Divizia B and Divizia C for Oltul Sfântu Gheorghe.

After 1980, Ioan Sărac coached youth teams of FC Bihor Oradea, with the 1972 generation as one of the groups considered high-performing over the years, with players such as Florin Farcaș, Petre Cristea, Attila Szocs, Cristian Herțe, Sorin Buhaș or Attila Varabecz, among others. He was the assistant coach of Viorel Abrudan, during the 1991–92 season, then working as a PE teacher for years, until his retirement.

Ioan Sărac died on 9 November 2021, at the age of 72, after a period in which his health had been poor.

== Honours ==
Bihor Oradea

- Divizia B: 1970–71, 1974–75

Oltul Sfântu Gheorghe

- Divizia C: 1979–80
