= Marius Popa =

Romanian footballer

Personal information
- Full name: Marius Cornel Popa
- Date of birth: 31 July 1978 (age 48)
- Place of birth: Oradea, Romania
- Height: 1.84 m (6 ft 1/2 in)
- Position: Goalkeeper

Team information
- Current team: FCSB (GK coach)

Youth career
- –1997: Bihor Oradea

Senior career*
Years	Team	Apps	(Gls)
1997–1999	Bihor Oradea	34	(0)
2000–2004	Naţional București	46	(0)
2005–2009	Politehnica Timişoara	100	(0)
2009–2010	Internaţional Curtea de Argeş	30	(0)
2010	Pandurii Târgu Jiu	12	(0)
2011–2012	Universitatea Cluj	22	(0)
Total		244	(0)

International career
2008	Romania	2	(0)

Managerial career
- 2012–2013: Luceafărul Oradea (GK coach)
- 2013: Oțelul Galați (GK coach)
- 2014–2015: ACS Poli Timișoara (GK coach)
- 2015: Steaua București (GK coach)
- 2016: Luceafărul Oradea (GK coach)
- 2016: Luceafărul Oradea (caretaker)
- 2016–2017: Pandurii Târgu Jiu (GK coach)
- 2017–2026: FCSB (GK coach)
- 2026: FCSB (academy GK coach)
- 2026–: FCSB (GK coach)
- * Club domestic league appearances and goals

Marius Cornel Popa (born 31 July 1978) is a Romanian former professional footballer who serves as goalkeeping coach at Liga I club FCSB.

== Club career ==
He started his career at the local team, Bihor Oradea in 1997 and three years later moved to FC Naţional. He managed to break into the first team in 2003 and his performances have earned him a few call-ups, although Popa has not played any minute yet for the Romania National team. He joined Poli in the winter break of the 2004/2005 season, together with National coach Cosmin Olăroiu and team-mates Gabriel Cânu, Gabriel Caramarin and Gigel Coman.

He has been the number one goalkeeper since arriving at Poli. However, he missed out on the Cupa României Final lost against Rapid Bucharest in the 2006/2007 season, when poor form and an injury a few weeks before the match offered youngster Costel Pantilimon the chance the shine. Pantilimon did not manage to hold on to his first team slot and Popa has since returned in goal.

== International career ==
Popa has also been called up to the Romania national team eleven times and made his debut in a friendly against Russia. He represented his country at the 2008 UEFA European Championship in Austria and Switzerland.

=== International stats ===
Romania
Year	Apps	Goals
2008	2	0
Total	2	0

== Honours ==
=== Player ===
Bihor Oradea

- Divizia C: 1997–98

Politehnica Timișoara

- Cupa României runner-up: 2006–07, 2008–09

=== Coach ===
Luceafărul Oradea

- Liga III: 2015–16
