= Alexandru Gergely =

Romanian professional footballer

Alexandru Gergely Gergely Sándor
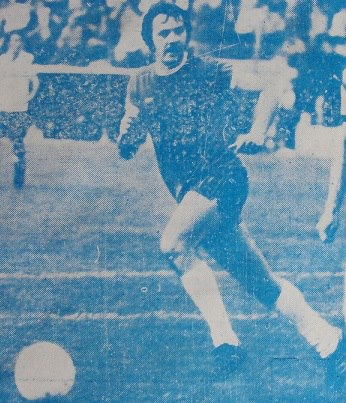
- Alexandru Gergely at FC Bihor

Personal information
- Date of birth: 16 September 1951
- Place of birth: Cristuru Secuiesc, Romania
- Date of death: 25 March 2018 (aged 66)
- Place of death: Oradea, Romania
- Height: 1.72 m (5 ft 8 in)
- Positions: Attacking midfielder; forward

Youth career
- 1964–1969: Unirea Cristuru Secuiesc

Senior career*
Years	Team	Apps	(Gls)
1969–1975	Steagul Roșu Brașov	142	(34)
1975–1980	Bihor Oradea	159	(54)
Total		301	(88)

Managerial career
- 1980–1997: Bihor Oradea (youth)
- 1997: Bihor Oradea (assistant)
- 1997–2002: Bihor Oradea (youth)
- 2002–2003: FC Oradea (assistant)
- 2003: Petrom Abram
- 2004–2005: FC Oradea (youth)
- 2005–2007: Liberty Salonta (youth)
- 2006–2007: Liberty Salonta (assistant)
- 2007–2008: Bihor II Oradea (assistant)
- 2008–2011: Bihor Oradea (youth)
- * Club domestic league appearances and goals as of 22:03, 8 January 2025 (UTC)

Alexandru Gergely (sometimes: Ghergheli; Hungarian: Sándor Gergely) (16 September 1951 – 25 March 2018) was a Romanian professional footballer and manager of Hungarian ethnicity. He grew up at Unirea Cristuru Secuiesc, then playing at senior level for Steagul Roșu Brașov and FC Bihor Oradea. After retirement, Gergely managed in the youth centers of FC Bihor Oradea and Liberty Salonta, being well known for discovering footballers such as: Claudiu Keșerü, Sebastian Achim, Cristian Cigan or Sergiu Homei, among others.

== Club career ==
Gergely grew up in Unirea Cristuru Secuiesc Football Academy and was trained at the Romanian national youth squads by famous coaches such as Gheorghe Ola or Cornel Drăgușin.

He made his debut at senior level for Steagul Roșu Brașov in 1970, also making its first appearance in the top-flight. After six years spent at the "yellow and blacks", in which he played in 142 matches and scored 34 goals, Gergely moved to FC Bihor Oradea, where he played until its retirement. At FC Bihor Oradea, "Gobe" (as he was nicknamed) was a member of the 1970s golden team, together with other two footballers from Brașov, Mircea Albu and Nicolae Florescu. He played in 159 matches for the "red and blues", scoring 54 goals.

Alexandru Gergely played in 268 Divizia A matches and scored 79 goals.

== Manager career ==
After retirement, Gergely was for years one of the coaches that activated in the FC Bihor Oradea Youth Academy, where he discovered players such as Claudiu Keșerü, Sebastian Achim or Cristian Cigan, among many others. For a short period, during the 2000s, he was also a coach in the Liberty Salonta Academy, in that period promoting other future top-flight players, among them, Sergiu Homei.

"Gobe" was also the assistant manager of FC Bihor Oradea and Liberty Salonta senior squads and the manager of 4th tier side Petrom Abram.

== Later years and death ==
In 2011, Gergely suffered the amputation of his right leg, the one with which he was making waves as a footballer. After this unfortunate medical event, he ended his career as a football manager. His beloved club, FC Bihor, made some efforts to help him financially in the following years, despite the fact that the club itself was in insolvency. Gergely died on 25 March 2018 at the age of 66.
