= Marcel Lăzăreanu =

Romanian footballer

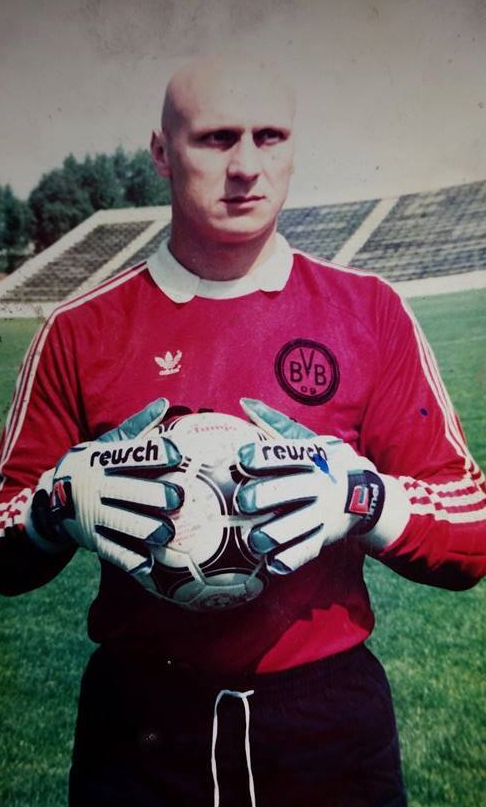
- Marcel Lăzăreanu in 1988

Personal information
- Full name: Marcel Călin Lăzăreanu
- Date of birth: 21 March 1954 (age 72)
- Place of birth: Cluj-Napoca, Romania
- Height: 1.78 m (5 ft 10 in)
- Position: Goalkeeper

Youth career
- Universitatea Cluj

Senior career*
Years	Team	Apps	(Gls)
1973–1982	Universitatea Cluj	185	(2)
1982–1983	CFR Cluj		
1983–1985	Armătura Zalău		
1985–1989	Bihor Oradea		
1989–1990	UTA Arad	64	(0)
1990–1991	Ilhwa Chuma	29	(0)
Total		278	(2)

Managerial career
- 1990: UTA Arad
- 1999: Universitatea Cluj
- * Club domestic league appearances and goals

Marcel Călin Lăzăreanu (born 21 March 1954) is a Romanian former professional footballer who played as a goalkeeper. He is the father of Filip Lăzăreanu, who is also a football goalkeeper.

== Club career ==
Lăzăreanu started his career at Universitatea Cluj in 1978, but he played for the most part of his career at Bihor Oradea, becoming an important name in the history of this club.

He also played for Ilhwa Chuma in the South Korean K League between 1990 and 1991, being the first Romanian player and foreign goalkeeper in the K League.

He appeared in 29 matches and conceded 40 goals.

When he played in the K League, he was notable for his appearance like Yul Brynner and his lawyer licence.

== Lawyer career ==
Lăzăreanu accepted a case - Cristian Dulca transfer fee embezzlement of Rapid București.
