= Zeno Bundea =

Romanian association football player

Personal information
- Full name: Zeno Marius Bundea
- Date of birth: 4 October 1977 (age 49)
- Place of birth: Oradea, Romania
- Height: 1.75 m (5 ft 9 in)
- Positions: Midfielder; right back

Youth career
- Bihor Oradea

Senior career*
Years	Team	Apps	(Gls)
1993–1995	Bihor Oradea	26	(4)
1996–1999	Rapid București	98	(10)
1999–2000	Kickers Offenbach	21	(2)
2000–2001	Rapid București	11	(0)
2001	FCM Bacău	11	(1)
2001–2002	Waldhof Mannheim	9	(2)
2002	Zenit St. Petersburg	2	(0)
2002–2005	FC U Craiova	67	(8)
2005–2006	Național București	34	(2)
2007	Maccabi Netanya	37	(3)
2008–2009	Universitatea Cluj	32	(3)
2009–2010	Bihor Oradea	16	(2)
2010–2011	ACU Arad	26	(6)
2011–2013	Luceafărul Felix	45	(4)
2013–2016	Hidișelu de Sus	16	(1)
2017–2018	Crișul Sântandrei		
2018–2019	Universitatea Oradea	20	(3)
Total		471	(51)

International career
2003	Romania	1	(0)

Managerial career
- 2017–: Zenit Oradea (youth)
- 2019–2021: Slovan Valea Cerului
- * Club domestic league appearances and goals

Zeno Marius Bundea (born 4 October 1977) is a Romanian football coach and a former player who played mainly as a midfielder.

Bundea started his career at Bihor Oradea, the main football club from his hometown and then played for important teams as: Rapid București, Zenit St. Petersburg, FC U Craiova, Naţional București or Universitatea Cluj. In the late years of his career Bundea came back to Oradea and played for Luceafărul Oradea in the Liga II, then for Liga IV clubs near the city, such as FC Hidişelu de Sus or Crișul Sântandrei. In 2016, Bundea was for a short period the sporting director of Luceafărul Oradea and in February 2017 he opened his own football academy, Zenit Oradea, named after his surname, Zeno, and a team he played for during his career, Zenit St. Petersburg.

== Honours ==
Rapid București

- Romanian Championship: 1998–99
- Cupa României: 1998

FC Hidişelu de Sus

- Liga IV-Bihor County: 2015–16
