= Ioan Naom =

Romanian footballer

Personal information
- Date of birth: 11 April 1951 (age 75)
- Place of birth: Oradea, Romania
- Height: 1.68 m (5 ft 6 in)
- Position: Central midfielder

Youth career
- 1963: Viitorul București
- 1963–1968: Metalul București

Senior career*
Years	Team	Apps	(Gls)
1968–1969	Metalul București	11	(0)
1969–1972	Steaua București	61	(1)
1972–1973	Rapid București	10	(0)
1973–1975	Olimpia Satu Mare	68	(5)
1975–1982	Bihor Oradea	225	(12)
Total		375	(18)

Managerial career
- 1982–1985: Bihor Oradea (youth center)
- 1985: Bihor Oradea (assistant)
- 1985–1987: Bihor Oradea (youth center)
- 1987–1988: Bihor Oradea (assistant)
- 1988–1993: Bihor Oradea (youth center)
- 1993–1995: Bihor Oradea (assistant)
- 1995–2004: Bihor Oradea (youth center)
- 2004–2005: Bihor Oradea II
- * Club domestic league appearances and goals

Ioan Naom (born 11 April 1951) is a Romanian former footballer who played as a midfielder. After he retired from playing football he worked mainly at Bihor Oradea's youth center where he taught and formed generations of players, which include Ovidiu Hoban, Mihai Neșu, Cosmin Vâtcă and Ramses Gado.

== Honours ==
Steaua București

- Cupa României: 1969–70, 1970–71

Olimpia Satu Mare

- Divizia B: 1973–74

Bihor Oradea

- Divizia B: 1981–82
