= Robert Cosmoc =

Romanian footballer

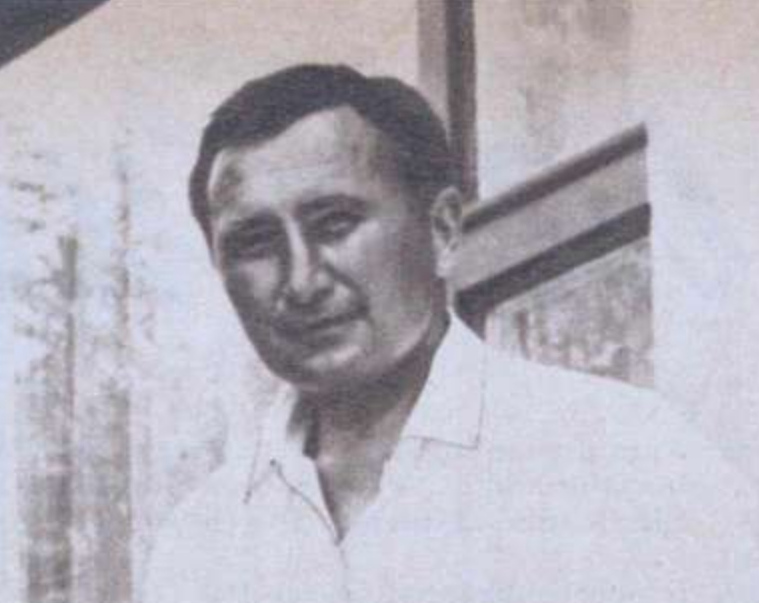
- Cosmoc in 1968

Personal information
- Date of birth: 17 July 1931
- Place of birth: Oradea, Romania
- Date of death: 11 December 1997 (aged 66)
- Place of death: Oradea, Romania
- Position: Midfielder

Senior career*
Years	Team	Apps	(Gls)
1946–1949	Libertatea Craiova		
1950–1958	Flacăra Ploiești		
1958–1962	Jiul Petroșani		
1962–1963	Știința București		

Managerial career
- 1963–1966: Știința Cluj (assistant)
- 1966–1968: Universitatea Craiova
- 1968–1969: Farul Constanța
- 1969–1972: Farul Constanța
- 1973–1975: Romania (assistant)
- 1975–1977: Bihor Oradea
- 1977–1978: FC Brăila
- 1979–1980: CSM Reșița
- 1980–1981: Progresul Brăila
- 1981–1982: Progresul Vulcan București
- 1982: Luceafărul București
- 1982–1983: Zimbrul Siret
- 1983–1984: CSM Suceava
- 1985–1986: Politehnica Timișoara
- 1986–1987: CSM Suceava
- 1987–1988: Progresul Brăila
- 1989–1990: Bihor Oradea
- 1990–1991: Rapid București
- 1992–1993: Corvinul Hunedoara
- 1993: Rapid București (technical director)
- 1993: Rapid București (caretaker)
- 1993–1995: Rapid București (youth center)
- 1995–1997: Viitorul Oradea
- 1997: Crișul Aleșd (technical director)
- * Club domestic league appearances and goals as of 22 November 2019

Robert "Puiu" Cosmoc (17 July 1931 – 11 December 1997) was a Romanian professional footballer who played as a midfielder for Flacăra Ploiești and Jiul Petroșani. After retirement, Cosmoc was a respectable football manager, managing for years in the Divizia A and obtaining notable results with clubs such as: Farul Constanța, Bihor Oradea, Progresul Brăila, CSM Suceava or Rapid București. Cosmoc was also the assistant manager of the Romania national football team in the tenure of Valentin Stănescu.

Former CSM Suceava player, Relu Buliga, described Cosmoc in an interview given in 2017:"Nea Puiu Cosmoc was a calm guy with a strong voice and a style based on the long diagonal pass".

== Honours ==
=== Player ===
Flacăra Ploiești

- Divizia B: 1954
- Cupa României: Runner-up 1952

Jiul Petroșani

- Divizia B: 1960–61

=== Manager ===
Știința Cluj

- Cupa României: 1965–66

CSM Suceava

- Divizia B: 1986–87
