= Cătălin Chiș =

Romanian footballer

Personal information
- Date of birth: 6 January 1988 (age 38)
- Place of birth: Zalău, Romania
- Height: 1.79 m (5 ft 10 in)
- Position: Midfielder

Youth career
- Liberty Salonta

Senior career*
Years	Team	Apps	(Gls)
2007–2009	Liberty Salonta	?	(3)
2009–2011	Bihor Oradea	34	(9)
2012	Politehnica Timișoara	18	(0)
2012–2013	Ceahlăul Piatra Neamț	2	(0)
Total		54	(12)

Managerial career
- 2014–2016: Atletic Zalău (youth)
- 2016–: Liviu Antal Football Academy (youth)
- * Club domestic league appearances and goals as of 3 December 2017

Cătălin Chiș (born 6 January 1988) is a Romanian former professional footballer who played as a midfielder. He ended his career at only 25 years after a serious injury suffered in the match Ceahlăul Piatra Neamț–CFR Cluj 2-2, played on 27 July 2012. In his short career Chiș was remarked at Bihor Oradea where he was one of the team's leaders in the 2010-11 campaign, at the end of which the team from Oradea should be promoted to Liga I. After the retirement Chiș started his coach career at youth level and also activated as a referee for a short period.
