= Alexandru Terheș =

Romanian footballer (born 1960)

Personal information
- Date of birth: 25 July 1960 (age 66)
- Place of birth: Baia Mare, Romania
- Position: Striker

Youth career
- 1972–1974: Minerul Baia Mare

Senior career*
Years	Team	Apps	(Gls)
1975–1976	Minerul Cavnic		
1976–1981	Baia Mare (Note: The statistics for the 1976–77 and 1977–78 Divizia B seasons are unavailable.)	99	(29)
1981–1987	Sportul Studențesc	165	(37)
1987–1988	FCM Brașov	44	(12)
1989–1990	Bihor Oradea	34	(8)
Total		342	(86)

International career^{‡}
1978–1981	Romania U21	22	(9)
1979–1980	Romania B	2	(0)
1986	Romania Olympic	1	(0)
1978–1979	Romania	2	(0)
- * Club domestic league appearances and goals as of 15 November 2017 ‡ National team caps and goals as of 15 November 2017

Alexandru Terheș (born 25 July 1960) is a Romanian former footballer who played as a striker. He played for Minerul Cavnic, Baia Mare, Sportul Studențesc, Brașov and Bihor Oradea. He also earned two caps for Romania.

== Club career ==
Terheș was born on 25 July 1960 in Baia Mare, Romania and began playing junior-level football in 1972 at local club Minerul Baia Mare. He started his senior career at Minerul Cavnic during the 1975–76 Divizia C season, helping them gain promotion to Divizia B at the end of the season. Shortly afterwards, he moved to FC Baia Mare, securing promotion with the team at the end of the 1977–78 Divizia B season. Terheș made his Divizia A debut on 24 August 1978 under coach Viorel Mateianu in a 2–0 home win over Dinamo București. During the 1979–80 season, he scored a career-best 15 goals to help the team finish in fourth place. However, in the following season, he could not prevent the club's relegation back to Divizia B. Subsequently, Terheș moved to Sportul Studențesc for a six-season spell. In the 1986–87 season, he scored 11 goals, which helped the team finish runner-up in the league. During his spell with Sportul, Terheș also played seven matches over the course of four UEFA Cup editions. Most notably, he played in a historical 1–0 victory against Inter Milan in the first round of the 1984–85 season, but the team did not qualify further, losing the second leg 2–0. In 1987, Terheș went to play for FCM Brașov. Midway through the 1988–89 season, he joined Bihor Oradea. There, he made his last Divizia A appearance on 6 May 1990 in a 4–1 away loss to Farul Constanța, totaling 340 matches with 83 goals in the competition.

== International career ==
From 1978 to 1986, Terheș was consistently featured for Romania's under-21, B and Olympic sides. Notably, while playing for the under-21 team, he netted a hat-trick in a 4–0 victory against England U21 in the 1982 European Under-21 Championship qualifiers.

Terheș played two friendly matches for Romania, making his debut on 11 October 1978, when coach Ștefan Kovács sent him on at halftime to replace Imre Bíró in a 1–0 win over Poland. His second appearance took place on 1 June 1979 in a 1–0 away loss to East Germany.

== Honours ==
Minerul Cavnic

- Divizia C: 1975–76

FC Baia Mare

- Divizia B: 1977–78

Sportul Studențesc

- Divizia A runner-up: 1986–87
