= Sebastian Achim =

Romanian footballer

Personal information
- Full name: Sebastian Zoltán Achim
- Date of birth: 2 June 1986 (age 40)
- Place of birth: Oradea, Romania
- Height: 1.80 m (5 ft 11 in)
- Position: Right back

Team information
- Current team: Crișul Sântandrei (sporting director)

Youth career
- Bihor Oradea

Senior career*
Years	Team	Apps	(Gls)
2004–2008	Bihor Oradea	66	(2)
2008–2011	Gloria Bistriţa	65	(0)
2011–2012	Universitatea Cluj	17	(0)
2012–2014	Petrolul Ploiești	27	(0)
2014–2016	Universitatea Craiova	52	(0)
2016–2018	Gyirmót	55	(0)
2018–2019	Szeged 2011	30	(0)
2019–2023	Füzesgyarmat	133	(8)
Total		445	(10)

Managerial career
- 2023–2024: Crișul Sântandrei (president)
- 2024–2025: Bihor Oradea (team manager)
- 2025–: Crișul Sântandrei (sporting director)
- * Club domestic league appearances and goals as of 13:22, 13 January 2026 (UTC)

Sebastian Zoltán Achim (born 2 June 1986) is a Romanian former footballer who played as a defender.

== Honours ==
Petrolul Ploiești

- Cupa României: 2012–13
- Supercupa României runner-up: 2013
