= Ovidiu Lazăr =

Romanian footballer

Personal information
- Full name: Ovidiu Traian Lazăr
- Date of birth: 3 December 1965 (age 60)
- Place of birth: Oradea, Romania
- Height: 1.80 m (5 ft 11 in)
- Position: Forward

Youth career
- Bihor Oradea

Senior career*
Years	Team	Apps	(Gls)
1983–1990	Bihor Oradea	164	(54)
1990	Steaua București	14	(5)
1991–1992	Bihor Oradea	24	(18)
1992	Honvéd	8	(2)
1993	Politehnica Timișoara	16	(1)
1994–1995	Bihor Oradea	32	(10)
1996	Brașov	5	(0)
1996–1997	Olimpia Satu Mare	4	(1)
Total		267	(91)

International career
1990–1997	Romania	1	(1)

Managerial career
- 2009: Bihor Oradea
- 2011–2012: Kinder Paleu
- 2013–2014: Poiana Budureasa
- 2015–2016: FC Paleu
- 2017–2019: Viitorul Borș
- 2019: Diosig Bihardiószeg
- 2021–2022: Diosig Bihardiószeg
- 2024–: Transilvania Sport Academy (youth)
- * Club domestic league appearances and goals

Ovidiu Traian Lazăr (born 3 December 1965) is a Romanian former professional footballer who played as a forward for teams such as: FC Bihor Oradea, Steaua București, Budapest Honvéd or Politehnica Timișoara, among others.
