= Cornel Lupău =

Romanian professional footballer

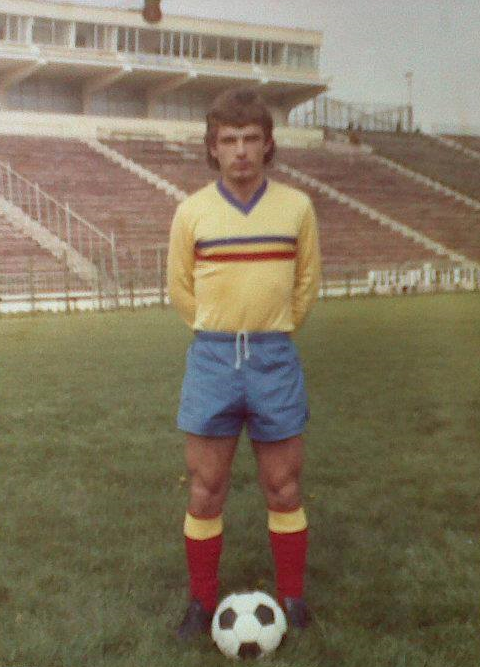
- Cornel Lupău in the 1976 Romania Olympic

Personal information
- Date of birth: 2 October 1957
- Place of birth: Bratca, Romania
- Date of death: 15 June 2014 (aged 56)
- Place of death: Oradea, Romania
- Height: 1.64 m (5 ft 5 in)
- Position: Midfielder

Youth career
- 1971–1975: Minerul Baia Mare

Senior career*
Years	Team	Apps	(Gls)
1975–1976	Minerul Baia Mare		
1976–1983	Bihor Oradea	100	(8)
1983–1984	UTA Arad		
Total		100+	(8+)

International career
1976	Romania Olympic		

Managerial career
- Bihor Oradea (youth)
- * Club domestic league appearances and goals as of 22 June 2020

Cornel Lupău (born 2 October 1957 – 15 June 2014) was a Romanian professional footballer. Lupău grew up at Minerul Baia Mare, team for which he made his senior debut, at the level of Divizia B. In 1976, Cornel moved to Bihor Oradea and made its debut in the top-flight, level at which he played in 100 matches, also scoring 8 goals. In 1983 he moved to UTA Arad, then played and coached for various teams at amateur level.

In 1976, Cornel Lupău was also a member of the Romanian Olympic football team.

After retirement he was for many years a football coach in the youth academy of Bihor Oradea.

== Honours ==
Bihor Oradea

- Divizia B: 1981–82
