= Attila Kun =

Romanian footballer and manager

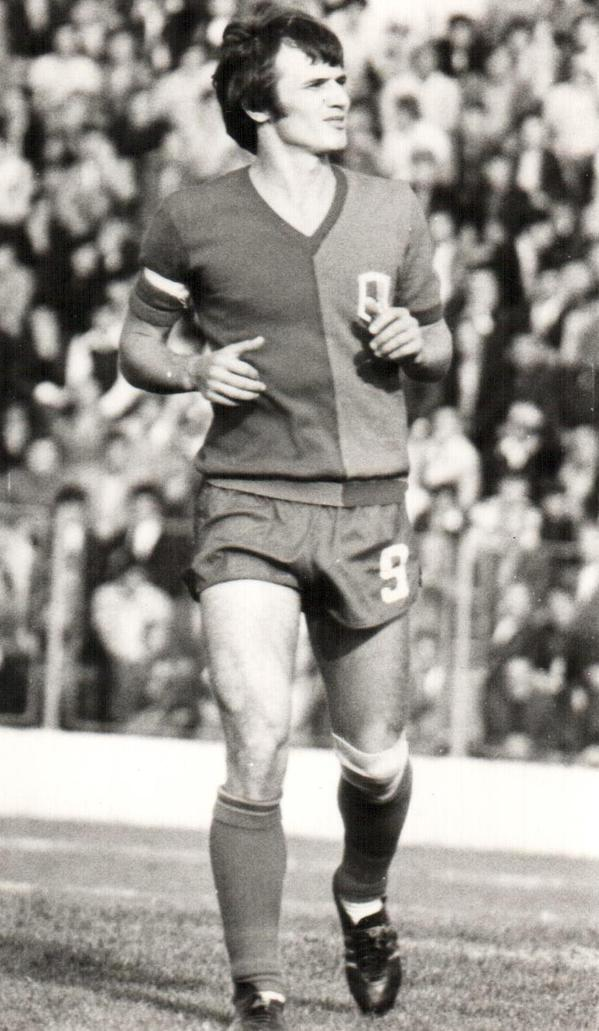
- Kun in 1970s

Personal information
- Date of birth: 9 March 1949 (age 77)
- Place of birth: Oradea, Romania
- Height: 1.78 m (5 ft 10 in)
- Position: Forward

Youth career
- 1957–1962: Blănuri Oradea
- 1962–1963: Crișana Oradea
- 1964–1965: Înfrățirea Oradea
- 1965–1966: Crișul Oradea

Senior career*
Years	Team	Apps	(Gls)
1966–1970	Crișul Oradea	81	(17)
1970–1974	UTA Arad	103	(35)
1974–1983	Bihor Oradea	162	(75)
1982	→ Unirea Valea lui Mihai (loan)		
Total		346	(127)

International career
1972–1976	Romania	17	(3)

Managerial career
- 1983: Bihor Oradea
- 1983–1984: Bihor Oradea (assistant)
- 1984: Bihor Oradea
- 1985: VFL Schorndorf
- 1986: Bihor Oradea (assistant)
- 2003–2007: SV Fellbach; Ulm 1846; FC Wollmatingen
- 2007–2010: FC Konstanz (youth)
- 2010: FC Konstanz
- 2011–2013: Singen (youth)
- 2014–2020: FC 09 Überlingen (youth)
- * Club domestic league appearances and goals

Attila Kun (also known as Attila Kun II; born 9 March 1949) is a Romanian former professional football player and manager of Hungarian ethnicity. He is considered one of the best players that ever played for Bihor Oradea, with over 240 matches played and over 90 goals scored.

== Career ==
Kun also played for UTA Arad in 103 matches and scored 35 goals. After retirement Kun started his football manager career at Bihor Oradea and in the middle of the 80's he moved in Germany where Attila coached lower league and youth teams.

Kun played in 17 matches and scored 3 goals for Romania, being one of the few players selected for national team even when he was playing in the second league.
