= Paul Popovici =

Romanian footballer (1948–2021)

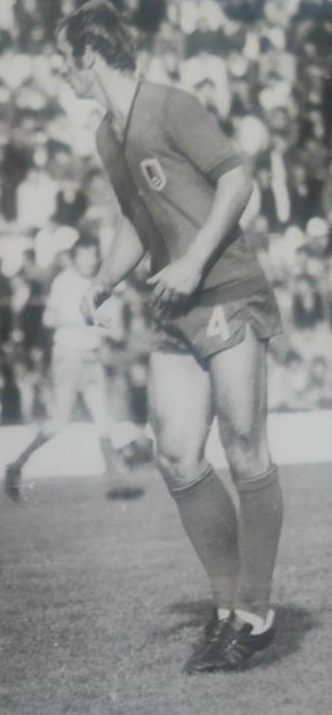
- Popovici in the 1970s

Personal information
- Date of birth: 21 June 1948
- Place of birth: Oradea, Romania
- Date of death: 7 April 2021 (aged 72)
- Place of death: Oradea, Romania
- Height: 1.76 m (5 ft 9 in)
- Position: Left-back

Youth career
- 1957–1958: Metalul Oradea
- 1958–1963: Crișana Oradea
- 1963–1964: Crișul Oradea

Senior career*
Years	Team	Apps	(Gls)
1964–1970	Crișul Oradea	96	(7)
1971–1974	UTA Arad	106	(2)
1974–1978	Bihor Oradea	120	(18)
1978–1979	Înfrățirea Oradea		
Total		322	(27)

International career
1971–1972	Romania	4 (Note: Including 3 appearances for Romania's Olympic team)	(0)

Managerial career
- 1988: Bihor Oradea (assistant)
- 1988: Bihor Oradea
- 1989–1990: Bihor Oradea (assistant)
- 1990: Bihor Oradea
- * Club domestic league appearances and goals

Paul Popovici or Paul Popovits (21 June 1948 – 7 April 2021) was a Romanian professional footballer who played as a left-back. He played almost all his career for two clubs, Bihor Oradea and UTA Arad. He also played four matches for Romania, making his debut in a match against Albania.

Popovici died in the morning of 7 April 2021, after he suffered a heart attack.
