= Árpád Szűcs =

Romanian footballer (1943–2026)

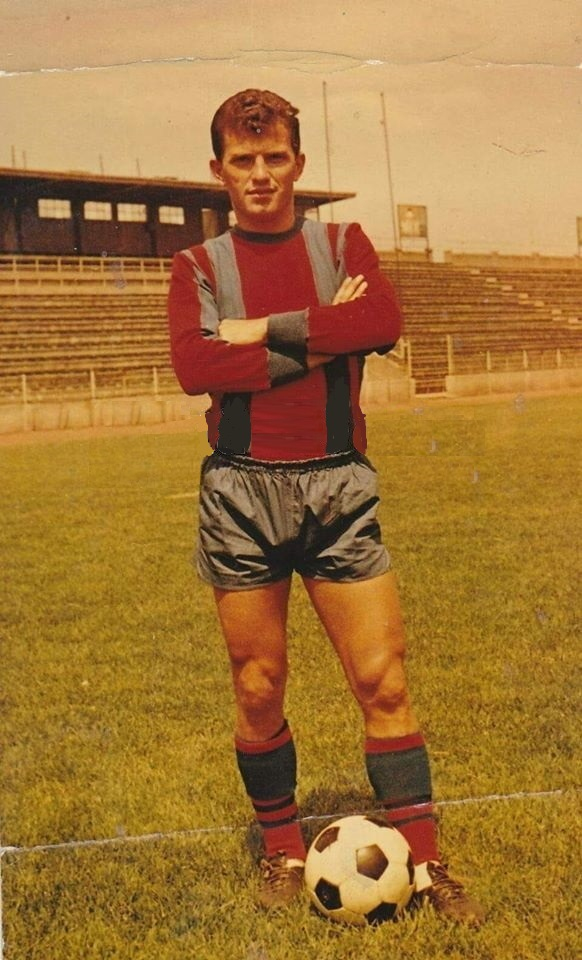
- Szűcs in 1968

Personal information
- Date of birth: 16 March 1943
- Place of birth: Oradea, Romania
- Date of death: 28 August 2026 (aged 83)
- Place of death: Oradea, Romania
- Height: 1.71 m (5 ft 7 in)
- Position: Right winger

Youth career
- 1957–1958: Metalul Oradea
- 1958–1961: CS Oradea

Senior career*
Years	Team	Apps	(Gls)
1961–1963	Crișana Oradea	54	(15)
1963–1964	Flamura Roșie Oradea	26	(0)
1964–1973	Bihor Oradea	175	(25)
1973	Mureșul Deva	18	(0)
1974	Jiul Petroșani	14	(0)
1974–1980	Bihor Oradea	80	(11)
1978–1979	→ Înfrățirea Oradea (loan)		
Total		367	(51)

Managerial career
- 1979–1980: Unirea Valea lui Mihai
- 1996: Bihor Oradea
- * Club domestic league appearances and goals as of 2 July 2020

Árpád Szűcs (also known as Arpad Suciu; 16 March 1943 – 28 August 2026) was a Romanian professional footballer who played as a right winger. Szűcs grew up in the youth academies of the historical local clubs Stăruința Oradea (named Metalul Oradea at that time) and Club Atletic Oradea (named CS Oradea at that time). He made his debut in the Divizia B for Crișana Oradea (former CS Oradea), in 1961, under the management of Ferenc Rónay, a notable figure of the Romanian and Hungarian football. One year later, young Szűcs also made his debut in the top-flight, for the same team, Crișana.

Crișana Oradea was dissolved in 1963 and Szűcs moved to second-tier club Flamura Roșie Oradea, then in 1964 signed a contract with the best ranked team from the city, Crișul Oradea. He played for 15 years and in more than 300 matches for FC Bihor Oradea (Crișul was renamed as FC Bihor in 1972). In general, Szűcs played for teams based in his hometown, except the 1973–74 season, in which he played for Mureșul Deva and Jiul Petroșani, with Jiul also winning the 1973–74 Cupa României, Szűcs scoring the fourth goal of the final.

Szűcs played in approx. 550 matches (first tier, second tier, cup and friendly matches) and scored 44 goals, from which 190 matches were in the top-flight, division in which he also scored 30 of his goals.

Szűcs died on 28 August 2026, after a fire broke out in his apartment in Oradea. He was 83.

== Honours ==
Crișana Oradea

- Divizia B: 1961–62

Bihor Oradea

- Divizia B: 1970–71, 1974–75

Jiul Petroșani

- Cupa României: 1973–74
