= Cornel Georgescu =

Romanian footballer and manager (1955–2020)

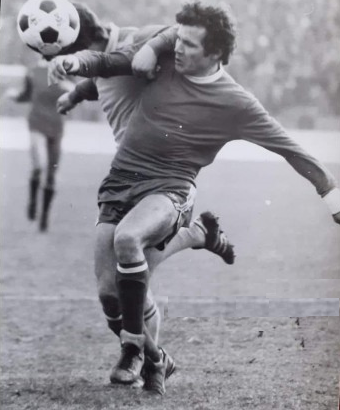
- Georgescu in 1983

Personal information
- Full name: Cornel Emilian Georgescu
- Date of birth: 13 June 1955
- Place of birth: Cluj-Napoca, Romania
- Date of death: 18 May 2020 (aged 64)
- Place of death: Cluj-Napoca, Romania
- Height: 1.69 m (5 ft 7 in)
- Position: Midfielder

Youth career
- 1969–1974: Minerul Bihor

Senior career*
Years	Team	Apps	(Gls)
1974–1989	Bihor Oradea	347	(96)
Total		347	(96)

Managerial career
- 1989–1991: Bihor Oradea (assistant)
- * Club domestic league appearances and goals as of 22 June 2020

Cornel Emilian Georgescu (born 13 June 1955 – 18 May 2020) was a Romanian professional footballer and manager. Georgescu grew up at Minerul Bihor, but played all his senior career for FC Bihor Oradea, club for which he is the record holder in all-time most appearances rankings, with 347 matches played at the level of Divizia A and Divizia B. He is also the all-time top scorer of "the red and blues", with 96 goals.

In the top-flight, Georgescu played in 205 matches and scored 31 goals. After retirement, he worked for a period as an assistant manager and as a coach in the youth academy of FC Bihor Oradea.

== Honours ==
Bihor Oradea

- Divizia B: 1974–75, 1981–82, 1987–88
