= Bogdan Szijj =

Romanian footballer

Personal information
- Full name: Bogdan Cristian Szijj
- Date of birth: 11 November 1998 (age 27)
- Place of birth: Reșița, Romania
- Height: 1.74 m (5 ft 9 in)
- Position: Defender

Team information
- Current team: CSU Alba Iulia
- Number: 5

Youth career
- –2015: CSMȘ Reșița

Senior career*
Years	Team	Apps	(Gls)
2015–2016	Metalul Reșița	11	(1)
2016–2018	CSMȘ Reșița	51	(1)
2018	Voluntari	3	(0)
2018–2024	CSM Reșița	67	(1)
2024–	CSU Alba Iulia	7	(0)
- * Club domestic league appearances and goals as of 18:01, 23 December 2024 (UTC)

Bogdan Cristian Szijj (born 11 November 1998) is a Romanian professional footballer who plays as a defender for CSU Alba Iulia.

== Club career ==
Szijj started his career in his hometown, at CSM Școlar Reșița and made the Liga II debut at only 16 years old, for Metalul Reșița, in a 1–0 victory against FC Bihor Oradea.

== Personal life ==
He is the son of Ioska Szijj, former player of CSM Reșița in the 1990s, in a squad that is considered to be the best in the history of the club. Ioska played along with names like Roco Sandu, Leontin Doană or Vasile Ciocoi.

== Honours ==
CSM Reșița

- Liga III: 2018–19, 2021–22, 2022–23
