= CSU Alba Iulia (football) =

Romanian association football club

CSU Alba iulia
- Full name: Clubul Sportiv Universitatea Alba Iulia
- Nicknames: Studenții (The students); Albaiulienii (The people from Alba Iulia)
- Short name: CSU Alba Iulia
- Founded: 2018; 8 years ago
- Ground: Pielarul
- Capacity: 500
- Owner: University of Alba Iulia
- General manager: Aurelian Băbuțan
- Head coach: Nicolae Ghișa
- League: Liga III
- 2025–26: Liga III, Seria VII, 9th
- Website: https://csualbaiulia.ro/
Home colours	Away colours

Clubul Sportiv Universitatea Alba Iulia, also known as CS Universitatea Alba Iulia, or simply as CSU Alba Iulia, is a Romanian football team based in Alba Iulia, Alba County, which currently plays in Liga III, the third tier of Romanian football, following their promotion at the end of the 2021–22 season.

The team represents the football section of the multi-sport club CSU Alba Iulia, which also include athletics, women's basketball, men's rugby and powerlifting sections.

== History ==
CSU Alba Iulia was established in 2009, with the support of University of Alba Iulia, having three sport sections (athletics, basketball and rugby). The football team was founded in 2018 and enrolled in Liga V – Alba County, the fifth tier of the Romanian football league system.

Under the leadership of Vasile Ursu and with experienced players such as Ioan Neag and Fabian Himcinschi, CSU finished 1st in Series II at the end of the 2018–19 season, promoting to fourth league.

The 2019–20 season was suspended in March 2020 due to the COVID-19 pandemic, with the university team in 2nd place, involved in the promotion battle, 5 points behind Ocna Mureș.

The next season was also canceled in Alba County due to the numerous teams that did not meet the conditions of the medical protocol imposed by the Romanian Football Federation.

In the 2021–22 season, with Mihai Manea as head coach, the team finished 1st and won the promotion play-offs against CSO Baraolt, the Covasna County champions, thrashing them 18–3 on aggregate (11–2 at home and 7–1 away).

In the first season in Liga III, led by Manea, CSU managed to climb on 5th place in the play-out of Series IX after was finish 7th in the regular season.

The next season was better for the Students as managed to qualify for the play-off of Series IX, after a strong battle with Unirea Ungheni and fellow citizens from Unirea Alba Iulia.

== Grounds ==
Initially the team of the University Sports Club from Alba Iulia played its home matches at the Cetate Stadium in Alba Iulia, but since the spring of 2024 the team moved its home matches at Pielarul Sports Base in Sebeș.

== Honours ==
Liga IV – Alba County

- Winners (1): 2021–22
- Runners-up (1): 2019–20

Liga V – Alba County

- Winners (1): 2018–19

== Players ==
=== First team squad ===
As of 10 September 2024

Note: Flags indicate national team as defined under FIFA eligibility rules; some limited exceptions apply. Players may hold more than one non-FIFA nationality.

No.	Pos.	Nation	Player
1	GK	ROU	Darius Paharnicu
2	DF	ROU	Szabolcs Kilyén (Captain)
4	DF	CIV	Abdoulaye Niakaté (on loan from CFR Cluj)
5	DF	ROU	Bogdan Szijj
6	DF	ROU	Andrei Dinu (on loan from FCSB)
7	MF	ROU	Emanuel Dat
8	MF	ROU	David Milchiș
10	MF	ROU	Vlad Mihalcea
11	MF	ROU	Răzvan Gățan
12	GK	ROU	George Pauletti
14	FW	ROU	Robert Tamaș
16	DF	ROU	Bogdan Bucurică

No.	Pos.	Nation	Player
18	MF	ROU	Bogdan Minteuan
21	DF	ROU	Bogdan Lazăr (on loan from Farul)
22	MF	ROU	Sebastian Culda
23	MF	ROU	Bogdan Sucitu (on loan from CFR Cluj)
24	FW	ROU	Andrei Banyoi
28	DF	ROU	Alberto Țica
70	MF	ROU	Darius Trifu
77	FW	ROU	Cătălin Tronea
80	MF	ROU	Eduard Vlad
97	DF	ROU	Rareș Popa
98	DF	ROU	Andrei Gavrilă
99	GK	ROU	Haralambie Mociu
??	DF	ROU	Antonio Dobrin (on loan from Sport Team)

=== Out on loan ===
Note: Flags indicate national team as defined under FIFA eligibility rules; some limited exceptions apply. Players may hold more than one non-FIFA nationality.

No. / Pos. / Nation / Player	No. / Pos. / Nation / Player

== Club Officials ==
=== Board of directors ===
Role	Name
Owners	(Romania) University of Alba Iulia
President	(Romania) Mihai Rotar
General manager	(Romania) Aurelian Băbuțan

=== Current technical staff ===
Role	Name
Head coach	(Romania) Nicolae Ghişa
Assistant coach	(Romania) Bogdan Bucurică
Goalkeeping coach	(Romania) Raul Unchiaș

== League history ==
Season	Tier	Division	Place	Notes	Cupa României
2025–26	3	Liga III (Seria VII)	9th		
2024–25	3	Liga III (Seria VII)	3rd		
2023–24	3	Liga III (Seria IX)	4th		
2022–23	3	Liga III (Seria IX)	5th		

Season	Tier	Division	Place	Notes	Cupa României
2021–22	4	Liga IV (AB)	1st (C)	Promoted	
2019–20	4	Liga IV (AB)	2nd		
2018–19	5	Liga V (AB)	1st (C)	Promoted	
