= Alexandru Giurgiu =

Romanian footballer

Personal information
- Full name: Alexandru Nicu Giurgiu
- Date of birth: 25 September 1992 (age 34)
- Place of birth: Alba Iulia, Romania
- Height: 1.87 m (6 ft 2 in)
- Position: Defender

Team information
- Current team: Unirea Alba Iulia
- Number: 23

Youth career
- Unirea Alba Iulia

Senior career*
Years	Team	Apps	(Gls)
2010–2011	Unirea Alba Iulia	32	(3)
2011–2013	Turnu Severin	25	(0)
2013	Astra Giurgiu	2	(0)
2014	Dinamo II București	6	(0)
2014	Metalul Reșița	0	(0)
2015	Farul Constanţa	7	(0)
2016	SC Bacău	17	(0)
2016	Slavia Sofia	4	(0)
2017–2021	Unirea Alba Iulia	104	(22)
2022–2023	Ocna Mureș	38	(12)
2023	CSU Alba Iulia	13	(3)
2024–	Unirea Alba Iulia	42	(10)
- * Club domestic league appearances and goals as of 08:51, 30 May 2026 (UTC)

Alexandru Nicu Giurgiu (born 25 September 1992) is a Romanian professional footballer who plays as a defender for Unirea Alba Iulia.
