= Sebastian Culda =

Romanian professional footballer

Personal information
- Full name: Sebastian Valeriu Culda
- Date of birth: 9 February 1996 (age 30)
- Place of birth: Alba Iulia, Romania
- Height: 1.83 m (6 ft 0 in)
- Position: Midfielder

Team information
- Current team: CSU Alba Iulia
- Number: 22

Youth career
- Unirea Alba Iulia

Senior career*
Years	Team	Apps	(Gls)
2014–2015	Unirea Alba Iulia	28	(32)
2015–2016	Mureșul Vințu de Jos	25	(12)
2016–2017	Unirea Alba Iulia	9	(5)
2017–2018	Astra II	17	(2)
2018–2021	Astra Giurgiu	2	(0)
2018	→ Metaloglobus București (loan)	11	(0)
2019	→ Ocna Mureș (loan)	15	(2)
2019–2021	→ SCM Zalău (loan)	28	(10)
2021	Unirea Ungheni	13	(5)
2022–2024	SCM Zalău	52	(9)
2024–	CSU Alba Iulia	12	(0)
- * Club domestic league appearances and goals as of 18:13, 23 December 2024 (UTC)

Sebastian Valeriu Culda (born 9 February 1996) is a Romanian professional footballer who plays as a midfielder for CSU Alba Iulia.

== Club career ==
=== Unirea Alba Iulia ===
Born in Alba Iulia, Culda started his career at local club Unirea Alba Iulia, for which he played its first match as a senior at the age of 18, at that time Unirea being in the fifth division. Culda scored 32 goals in his first season, being decisive in Unirea's promotion campaign. The poor financial situation of "the Black and Whites" and the lack of an ambitious goal made the youngster move Mureșul Vințu de Jos.

=== Mureșul Vințu de Jos ===
Arriving in the summer of 2015 at Vințu de Jos, Culda played for the team that won the Liga IV-Alba County series and the promotion play-off against Mureșul Luduș, Mureș County champions. The roster included experienced players such as Ovidiu Stoianof, Mădălin Popa, Răzvan Dulap, and Nicușor Bănică, managed by Dan Mănăilă. Culda scored 12 goals in 25 matches. Following promotion, the club experienced financial difficulties, and he transferred back to Unirea.

=== Unirea Alba Iulia ===
In the summer of 2016, Culda returned to Unirea, which was promoted to Liga III due to the excellent results at the youth level. He continued its good form and scored another 5 goals in only 9 matches.

=== Astra Giurgiu ===
In the summer of 2017, Sebastian Culda signed with Astra Giurgiu and in the first part of the championship he played for the second team, from Liga III, scoring 4 goals.

On 10 March 2018, Culda made his Liga I debut for Astra in a 0–1 loss to CS Universitatea Craiova.
