= Andrei Vaștag =

Romanian footballer

Personal information
- Full name: Andrei Ionuț Adrian Vaștag
- Date of birth: 21 March 1994 (age 32)
- Place of birth: Reșița, Romania
- Height: 1.83 m (6 ft 0 in)
- Position: Defensive midfielder

Youth career
- 2001–2011: LPS Banatul Timișoara

Senior career*
Years	Team	Apps	(Gls)
2011–2012	Săgeata Năvodari	24	(0)
2012–2013	Viitorul Constanța	19	(0)
2013–2015	Dinamo București	0	(0)
2013	→ Corona Brașov (loan)	0	(0)
2013–2014	→ CSM Metalul Reșița (loan)	29	(0)
2015–2016	Würmla	5	(0)
2016–2017	Cetate Deva	26	(2)
2017–2018	CSMȘ Reșița	27	(2)
2018–2019	Metalurgistul Cugir	14	(2)
2020	SCM Zalău	1	(0)
2020–2021	Filiași	16	(3)
2021	Oțelul Galați	13	(1)
2022–2023	Voința Lupac	21	(1)

International career^{‡}
2010–2011	Romania U-17	8	(1)
2011–2012	Romania U-19	6	(0)
2013–2014	Romania U-21	3	(0)

Managerial career
- 2022–2023: Voința Lupac (assistant)
- * Club domestic league appearances and goals as of 14:32, 15 January 2024 (UTC) ‡ National team caps and goals as of 12 June 2014

Andrei Vaștag (born 21 March 1994) is a Romanian footballer who plays as a midfielder.

== International career ==
Vaștag made his debut for Romania U-17 on 21 September 2010 in a game against Kazakhstan U-17. He played with the under-17 team at the 2011 UEFA European Under-17 Football Championship.

== Personal life ==
He is the son of the former great boxer, Francisc Vaștag.
