= Cristian Popa =

Romanian archaeologist

Dr. Cristian Popa is a Romanian archaeologist at the 1 Decembrie 1918 University, Alba Iulia, Romania. He is one of the most extensively published experts on the Coţofeni culture and generally acknowledged as an authority on this prehistoric culture. He is also known for having discovered the flint mining settlement at the Piatra Tomii archaeological site.
