= Bogdan Bucurică =

Romanian footballer

Personal information
- Full name: Bogdan Nicolae Bucurică
- Date of birth: 11 February 1986 (age 40)
- Place of birth: Târgoviște, Romania
- Height: 1.76 m (5 ft 9 in)
- Position: Left-back

Team information
- Current team: CSU Alba Iulia
- Number: 16

Youth career
- CSȘ Dâmbovița Nucet
- "U" Alpan Târgoviște

Senior career*
Years	Team	Apps	(Gls)
2004–2006	Châteauroux	0	(0)
2006–2007	CFR Cluj	0	(0)
2007	Gloria Bistrița	0	(0)
2007–2013	Unirea Alba Iulia	98	(5)
2013–2017	Concordia Chiajna	107	(1)
2017	Universitatea Craiova	5	(0)
2017	Concordia Chiajna	11	(0)
2018–2019	Voluntari	32	(0)
2020–2021	Unirea Alba Iulia	14	(2)
2021–	CSU Alba Iulia	69	(18)
- * Club domestic league appearances and goals as of 18:07, 23 December 2024 (UTC)

Bogdan Bucurica (born 11 February 1986) is a Romanian footballer who plays as a defender for CSU Alba Iulia.

== Career ==
Bucurică began his professional career at "U" Alpan Târgoviște. During the summer of 2004, however, he was picked up by French second league side LB Châteauroux. He did not play there very much, being mainly injured.

During the summer of 2006, Bucurică signed for CFR Cluj. He injured himself before the start of the 2006–2007 season and was out until the summer of 2007.

Bucurică also played for the Romanian Under-19 national team.

== Honours ==
Unirea Alba Iulia

- Liga II: 2008-09
