= Edward Zimmerman =

Edward Zimmerman may refer to:

- Edward M. Zimmerman (1859–1922), American composer, choir conductor, organist, bass, and music educator
- Eddie Zimmerman (1883–1945), American baseball player

== See also ==
- Eduard Zimmermann (1929–2009), German journalist, television presenter and security expert
- Eduard Cristian Zimmermann (born 1983), Romanian footballer
