= Vasile Ciocoi =

Romanian footballer

Personal information
- Full name: Vasile Sansiro Ciocoi
- Date of birth: 4 February 1976 (age 50)
- Place of birth: Bocșa, Romania
- Height: 1.75 m (5 ft 9 in)
- Position: Midfielder

Youth career
- 1983–1992: Metalul Bocșa

Senior career*
Years	Team	Apps	(Gls)
1992–1994	Metalul Bocșa		
1995–2002	CSM Reșița	170	(33)
1999	→ Naţional București (loan)	12	(0)
2002–2003	FC Universitatea Craiova	12	(0)
2003–2004	Jiul Petroșani	26	(0)
2004	Unirea Sânnicolau Mare	11	(1)
2005	Jiul Petroșani	4	(0)
2010–2011	Minerul Uricani		
- * Club domestic league appearances and goals as of 19 June 2016

Vasile Sansiro Ciocoi (born 4 February 1976) is a former Romanian professional footballer. He was part of one of the best football generation of CSM Reșița with players like Leontin Doană, Sandu Roco or Cristian Chivu. His name Sansiro is inspired by the San Siro stadium from Milan.
