= CSU Alba Iulia (women's basketball) =

- Nickname: Albaiuliencele (Women from Alba Iulia)
- Leagues: Liga Națională
- Founded: 2007; 18 years ago
- History: CSU Alba Iulia (2007–present)
- Arena: Sala Sporturilor
- Capacity: 400
- Location: Alba Iulia, Romania
- Team colors: White, Blue
- President: Bogdan Duma
- Head coach: Vladimir Ivanković
Home	Away

Clubul Sportiv Universitatea Alba Iulia, commonly known as CSU Alba Iulia, is a Romanian professional women's basketball team based Alba Iulia, Alba County. The team plays in Liga Națională, the women's top-tier professional basketball league of Romania.

The team represents the women's basketball section of the multi-sport club CSU Alba Iulia, which also include athletics, men's football, men's rugby and powerlifting sections.

== Current roster ==
Note: Flags indicate national team eligibility at FIBA-sanctioned events. Players may hold other non-FIBA nationalities not displayed.

CSU Alba Iulia roster
Players
Coaches

Pos.	No.	Nat.	Name	Ht.
C		(United States)	Fleming, Tyshara	1.93 m (6 ft 4 in)
G		(United States)	January, Jessica	1.70 m (5 ft 7 in)
F		(United States)	Lerma, Leticia	1.78 m (5 ft 10 in)
SG		(Bosnia and Herzegovina)	Omerbasić, Lejla	1.82 m (6 ft 0 in)
PF		(Serbia)	Radović, Marija	1.86 m (6 ft 1 in)
PG		(Romania)	Agache, Tania	1.62 m (5 ft 4 in)
F/C		(Romania)	Bobar, Alexandra	1.78 m (5 ft 10 in)
PF		(Romania)	Cutaș, Cristiana (C)	1.88 m (6 ft 2 in)
G		(Romania)	Fleșer, Andreea	1.63 m (5 ft 4 in)
SF		(Romania)	Fodor, Marta	1.83 m (6 ft 0 in)
PG		(Romania)	Geleriu, Mădălina	1.72 m (5 ft 8 in)
F		(Romania)	Ignat, Diana	1.70 m (5 ft 7 in)

Head coach

Manuel A. Rodriguez Escudero

Legend

- (C) Team captain
- Injured

- Roster
Updated: 28 September 2017
