= Daniel Vădrariu =

Romanian footballer

Personal information
- Full name: Petru Daniel Vădrariu
- Date of birth: 25 June 1990 (age 36)
- Place of birth: Reșița, Romania
- Height: 1.78 m (5 ft 10 in)
- Position: Winger

Team information
- Current team: SV Schalchen
- Number: 7

Youth career
- FCM Reșița
- 2005−2006: SV Schwechat
- 2006−2007: Juventus București
- 2007−2008: Jiul Petroșani

Senior career*
Years	Team	Apps	(Gls)
2007−2009	Jiul Petroșani	38	(4)
2009−2012	Dinamo București	0	(0)
2009−2010	→ Astra Ploiești (loan)	13	(2)
2010−2011	→ Ceahlăul Piatra Neamț (loan)	23	(4)
2011−2012	→ Astra Ploiești (loan)	2	(0)
2012−2014	Astra Giurgiu	4	(0)
2013	→ Bihor Oradea (loan)	9	(0)
2013	→ Tiraspol (loan)	4	(0)
2014	Metalul Reșița	6	(0)
2015	Karabakh Wien	?	(?)
2015−2016	Dunărea Călărași	35	(2)
2016	ACS Poli Timișoara	8	(0)
2017	Karabakh Wien	21	(2)
2018	CSM Reșița	9	(2)
2018	UTA Arad	13	(0)
2019−2020	CSM Reșița	40	(7)
2021	Sfântul Gheorghe	5	(0)
2021	Voința Lupac		
2022	SV Schwechat	11	(0)
2022–	SV Schalchen	11	(0)

International career
2011	Romania U21	3	(0)
- * Club domestic league appearances and goals as of 20:05, 9 March 2023 (UTC)

Petru Daniel Vădrariu (born 25 July 1990) is a Romanian footballer who plays as a winger for Austrian club SV Schalchen.

== Career ==
Vădrariu signed for Moldovan National Division club Sfântul Gheorghe Suruceni in January 2021.

== Honours ==
CSM Reșița

- Liga III: 2018–19
