= Ion Goanță =

Romanian footballer

Personal information
- Date of birth: 29 March 1963 (age 63)
- Place of birth: Bistreț, Romania
- Height: 1.72 m (5 ft 8 in)
- Position: Attacking midfielder

Senior career*
Years	Team	Apps	(Gls)
1982–1983	CSM Drobeta-Turnu Severin		
1983–1984	CSM Reșița		
1984–1991	Rapid București (Note: The statistics for the 1989–90 Divizia B season are unavailable.)	168	(36)
1991–1992	Hapoel Tzafririm Holon	11	(2)
1992–1993	Rapid București	6	(1)
Total		185	(39)

International career
1988	Romania Olympic	4	(0)
1988	Romania	2	(0)
- * Club domestic league appearances and goals

Ion Goanță (born 29 March 1963) is a Romanian former footballer who played as a midfielder.

== Club career ==
Goanță was born on 29 March 1963 in Bistreț, Romania. He began playing football in 1982 at Divizia B club CSM Drobeta-Turnu Severin, moving one year later to CSM Reșița. Subsequently, he joined Rapid București, making his Divizia A debut on 2 September 1984 under coach Victor Stănculescu in a 1–1 draw against Universitatea Craiova. He scored his first goal in the 13th round of the 1984–85 season in a 1–0 win over ASA Târgu Mureș. During the 1987–88 season, Goanță netted a career-best 11 goals. The team was relegated at the end of the 1988–89 season, but Goanță stayed with the club, helping it gain promotion back to the first league after one year. Subsequently, he made five appearances in the 1989 Intertoto Cup, netting a brace in a 3–1 win over Örgryte, a hat-trick in a 5–0 victory against Spartak Varna and one goal in a 2–1 success over Wismut Aue. Afterwards, he joined Hapoel Tzafririm Holon, making 11 appearances and scoring twice in the 1991–92 Liga Leumit season. Goanță returned to Rapid where on 20 September 1992, he made his last Divizia A appearance in a 2–1 away loss to Dinamo București, totaling 174 matches with 37 goals in the competition. He retired at age 30 due to a torn calf muscle.

== International career ==
Goanță played two friendly games for Romania, making his debut on 3 February 1988, when coach Emerich Jenei sent him in the 70th minute to replace Dorin Mateuț in a 2–0 win over Israel. Three days later, he played in a 2–2 draw against Poland. Subsequently, Goanță played four games for Romania's Olympic team during the 1988 Summer Olympics qualifiers.

== Honours ==
Rapid București

- Divizia B: 1989–90
