= Stadionul Soda =

2,000 seat stadium in Romania

- Interactive map of Stadionul Soda
- Address: Str. Colonia peste Mureș
- Location: Ocna Mureș, Romania
- Coordinates: 46°23′51.612″N 23°51′11.916″E
- Owner: Town of Ocna Mureș
- Operator: CS Ocna Mureș
- Capacity: 2.000 (1.500 on seats)
- Surface: Grass

Construction
- Built: 1936
- Opened: 30 August 1936
- Renovated: 2015

Tenant
- CS Ocna Mureș (1936-present)

Stadionul Soda, nicknamed Stadionul Dragostei (Love Stadium), is a Romanian multi-purpose stadium in Ocna Mureș, Alba County, mostly used for football matches, being the home ground of CS Ocna Mureș. The stadium holds 2,000 seats where 500 of them are covered.

The stadium was opened on 30 August 1936 with the occasion of the match between Solvay Uioara and IAR Brașov (2–4), and was the host of first football match on floodlight in Romania.

In 2014, the stadium was bought by Ocna Mureș town hall for 35,000 euros, after the former combine Upsom, the largest producer of soda ash in Romania, went bankrupt, and was renovated in 2015.
