= 1990–91 Cupa României =

Tournament details
- Country: Romania

Final positions
- Champions: Universitatea Craiova
- Runners-up: FC Bacău

The 1990–91 Cupa României was the 53rd edition of Romania's most prestigious football cup competition.

The title was won by Universitatea Craiova against FC Bacău.

== Format ==
The competition is an annual knockout tournament.

First round proper matches are played on the ground of the lowest ranked team, then from the second round proper the matches are played on a neutral location.

If a match is drawn after 90 minutes, the game goes in extra time, if the scored is still tight after 120 minutes, then the winner will be established at penalty kicks.

In the semi-finals, each tie is played as a two legs.

From the first edition, the teams from Divizia A entered in competition in sixteen finals, rule which remained until today.

== First round proper ==
Team 1	Score	Team 2
12 December 1990
Carpaţi Agnita (Div. C)	0–1	(Div. A) FC Bacău
Unirea Alba Iulia (Div. B)	2–1 (a.e.t.)	(Div. A) FCM Brașov
Minerul Băiţa (Div. C)	0–1	(Div. A) Inter Sibiu
Cavalerii Fluierului Bistriţa (Div. D)	2–0	(Div. A) Progresul Brăila
FEPA'74 Bârlad (Div. C)	0–0 (a.e.t.)(6–7 p)	(Div. A) Petrolul Ploiești
Metrom Braşov (Div. C)	0–0 (a.e.t.)(4–5 p)	(Div. A) Rapid București
CFR-BTA București (Div. C)	0–2	(Div. A) Politehnica Timișoara
Universitatea Cluj (Div. A)	2–1	(Div. A) Gloria Bistrița
Electroputere Craiova (Div. B)	0–1	(Div. A) Dinamo București
Oțelul Galați (Div. B)	0–1 (a.e.t.)	(Div. A) Universitatea Craiova
Foresta Gugeşti (Div. C)	1–2 (a.e.t.)	(Div. A) Farul Constanța
Cimentul Voinţa Medgidia (Div. D)	0–3	(Div. A) Sportul Studenţesc București
Bihor Oradea (Div. A)	1–1 (a.e.t.)(2–3 p)	(Div. A) Steaua București
Automecanica Reşiţa (Div. C)	1–0	(Div. A) Corvinul Hunedoara
Petrolul Stoina (Div. C)	1–2	(Div. A) Argeş Piteşti
Mureşul Topliţa (Div. C)	3–0	(Div. A) Jiul Petroșani

== Second round proper ==
Team 1	Score	Team 2
27 February 1991
Steaua București	1–0	Petrolul Ploiești
Rapid București	2–3 (a.e.t.)	Universitatea Craiova
Unirea Alba Iulia	1–0	Cavalerii Fluierului Bistriţa
Politehnica Timișoara	1–3	Dinamo București
Mureşul Topliţa	0–1	FC Bacău
Farul Constanța	4–0	Automecanica Reşiţa
Inter Sibiu	2–1	Sportul Studenţesc București
Argeş Piteşti	1–0	Universitatea Cluj

== Quarter-finals ==
The matches were played on 13 March and 1 May 1991.

Team 1	Agg.	Team 2	1st leg	2nd leg
Dinamo București	1–2	Universitatea Craiova	1–0	0–2 (a.e.t.)
Steaua București	2–4	Unirea Alba Iulia	0–3	2-1
Farul Constanța	2–2 (a)	Inter Sibiu	2–1	0–1
Argeş Piteşti	2–3	FC Bacău	2–1	0–2

Notes:

- ‡ Steaua București lost the match (0-3) by decision of Romanian Federation of Footaball for fielding a suspended player (Basarab Panduru).

== Semi-finals ==
The matches were played on 8 May and 29 May 1991.

Team 1	Agg.	Team 2	1st leg	2nd leg
Universitatea Craiova	4–3	Unirea Alba Iulia	4–0	0–3
Inter Sibiu	0–1	FC Bacău	0–0	0–1

== Final ==
26 June 1991
20:30 EET

Universitatea Craiova	2–1	FC Bacău
Zamfir 48', 64'	Report	Jercălău 53' (pen.)

Stadionul Naţional, Bucharest
Attendance: 20,000
Referee: Ion Crăciunescu (Romania)

Cupa României 1990–91 winners

1st title
