= Franck Tchassem =

Cameroonian footballer (born 1999)

Personal information
- Date of birth: 7 May 1999 (age 27)
- Place of birth: Mbanga, Cameroon
- Height: 1.80 m (5 ft 11 in)
- Position: Winger

Team information
- Current team: CSM Reșița
- Number: 30

Youth career
- –2018: Matelots

Senior career*
Years	Team	Apps	(Gls)
2018–2019	Matelots		
2019–2021	Șomuz Fălticeni		
2021–2022	Știința Miroslava		
2023	Viitorul Dăești		
2023–2024	CSM Focșani		
2024–2025	Universitatea Cluj	8	(0)
2025	→ Argeș Pitești (loan)	13	(2)
2025–2026	Argeș Pitești	5	(0)
2026	→ CSM Reșița (loan)	10	(0)
2026–	CSM Reșița	11	(1)
- * Club domestic league appearances and goals as of 1 November 2026

Franck Tchassem (born 7 May 1999) is a Cameroonian professional footballer who plays as a winger for Liga II club CSM Reșița.

== Honours ==
Argeș Pitești

- Liga II: 2024–25
