= Lucian Dobre =

Romanian footballer and manager

Personal information
- Full name: Lucian Mihail Dobre
- Date of birth: 25 September 1978 (age 48)
- Place of birth: Reșița, Romania
- Height: 1.81 m (5 ft 11 in)
- Position: Defender

Youth career
- –1997: CSM Reșița

Senior career*
Years	Team	Apps	(Gls)
1997–2000	CSM Reșița	43	(0)
2000–2003	Astra Ploiești	65	(1)
2003–2004	Petrolul Ploiești	21	(0)
2004–2005	Universitatea Craiova	14	(0)
2005–2007	Zimbru Chișinău	40	(1)
2007	Spartak Nalchik	0	(0)
2008–2009	Tavriya Simferopol	7	(0)
2009–2010	CSMȘ Reșița		
2010–2011	Iskra-Stal Rîbnița	16	(5)
2011	Dacia Chișinău	7	(0)
2011–2012	Farul Constanța	16	(0)
2012–2013	Muncitorul Reșița		
Total		229	(7)

Managerial career
- 2009–2010: CSMȘ Reșița (player/coach)
- 2014–2015: Semenicul Văliug
- 2016–2017: CSMȘ Reșița (assistant)
- 2018: CSMȘ Reșița (assistant)
- 2021–2022: ASU Politehnica Timișoara (assistant)
- 2022–2023: Voința Lupac
- 2026: Chindia Târgoviște (assistant)
- * Club domestic league appearances and goals

Lucian Mihail Dobre (born 25 September 1978) is a Romanian former professional footballer who played as a defender.

== Honours ==
Zimbru Chișinău

- Cupa Moldovei: 2006–07

Dacia Chișinău

- Divizia Națională: 2010–11
