= AS Viitorul Lupac =

Romanian football club

Viitorul Lupac
- Full name: Asociația Sportivă; Viitorul 2025 Lupac
- Nickname: Croații (The Croats)
- Short name: Lupac
- Founded: 1982; 44 years ago as Voința Lupac; 2025; 1 year ago as Viitorul 2025 Lupac
- Ground: Voința
- Capacity: 350
- League: Liga V
- 2023–24: Liga III, Seria VII, 7th (withdrew)
Home colours	Away colours

Asociația Sportivă Viitorul 2025 Lupac, commonly known as Viitorul Lupac, is a Romanian football club based in Lupac, Caraș-Severin County, and currently plays in Liga V – Caraș-Severin County, the fifth tier of the Romanian football. The players are nicknamed "the Croats," as the Lupac commune is predominantly inhabited by Krashovani Croats.

Founded in 1982 as Voința Lupac, the Croats earned promotion to Liga III at the end of the 2020–21 season, and after three seasons in the third tier, Voința was disbanded in 2024 and later refounded in 2025 as Viitorul 2025 Lupac.

== History ==
Former logo, as Voința Lupac.

Founded in 1982 as Voința Lupac, the team from the foothills of the Banat Mountains spent its early years competing at the second level of the Caraș-Severin county championships. In 2005, they managed to secure promotion to the first tier, finishing 10th in 2005–06, 13th in 2006–07, 6th in 2007–08, 3rd in 2008–09, and runners-up in 2009–10. After finishing 3rd in 2010–11, Voința again claimed runners-up spots in 2011–12 and 2012–13, establishing themselves as serious contenders in the county league.

The Croats managed to top the Caraș-Severin County league in 2014–15 for the first time. However, their hopes of promotion to Liga III were dashed after a play-off against ASU Politehnica Timișoara, the champions of Liga IV – Timiș County, suffering a heavy 1–5 defeat in Timișoara, despite a 2–1 win at home in Lupac.

Voința managed to win again the Liga IV – Caraș-Severin County in the 2017–18 season and faced in the promotion play-off, the winner of Liga IV – Hunedoara County, CS Hunedoara, but despite a 1–0 away win in the first leg, Voința lost the promotion after an 1–2 defeat in the second leg in front of their own supporters.

At the end of 2018–19 season, Voința Lupac, led by Boșco Vișatovici, crowned as county champion of Liga IV – Caraș-Severin County and qualified for the promotion play-off in Liga III, but lost (0–2 at home and 1–6 away) in front of Fortuna Becicherecu Mic, the winner of Liga IV – Timiș County.

Voința promoted for the first time in its history to Liga III at the end of the 2020–21 season. Coached by Boșco Vișatovici, the Croats won the Liga IV – Caraș-Severin County and the promotion play-off against Universitatea Craiova II (0–1 at Craiova and 3–0 at Lupac).

As newly promoted in the 2021–22 Liga III, Voința Lupac finished 3rd in Series VII, both in the regular season and in the play-off, ahead of Pandurii Târgu Jiu and CSM Reșita and CSM Deva, who claimed the first two spots. The squad for their debut season in the third league included players such as Căpățână, Trașcă, D. Petruț, Circa, Danci, Banac, Vădrariu, Vaștag, Avramovici, Giurică, Flucica, Bărbulescu, Dalea, Kawagoe, Săndescu, Jivan, Arjocan, Cega, Marcu, Jinga, Cr. Popa, and Cristodulo, among others.

Voința Lupac appointed Lucian Dobre as head coach for the 2022–23 campaign, but he left in January with three rounds remaining in the regular season of Series VII. Adrian Enășescu took over and guided the Croats to a 6th-place finish in the first stage, ultimately securing 5th place overall after the play-out round.

The following season, Enășescu departed Voința after five rounds, with Mircea Manu taking charge and leading the team to 7th place in both the regular season and the play-out stage of Series VII. However, financial problems led to Voința’s dissolution in the summer of 2024, and the club was excluded by the Romanian Football Federation from all competitions. After one year of inactivity, it was subsequently refounded in 2025 as Viitorul 2025 Lupac and enrolled in Liga V – Caraș-Severin County, the fifth tier of the Romanian football league system.

== Honours ==
Liga IV – Caraș-Severin County

- Winners (4): 2014–15, 2017–18, 2018–19, 2020–21
- Runners-up (5): 2009–10, 2011–12, 2012–13, 2015–16, 2016–17

== League and Cup history ==
Season	Tier	Division	Place	Notes	Cupa României
2025–26	5	Liga V (CS)	TBD		
2024–25		Not active			
2023–24	3	Liga III (Seria VII)	7th	Disbanded	
2022–23	3	Liga III (Seria VII)	5th		

Season	Tier	Division	Place	Notes	Cupa României
2021–22	3	Liga III (Seria VII)	3rd		
2020–21	4	Liga IV (CS)	1st (C)	Promoted	
2019–20	4	Liga IV (CS) (Oravița Zone)	2nd		
2018–19	4	Liga IV (CS)	1st (C)		
