= Bocșa =

- Town
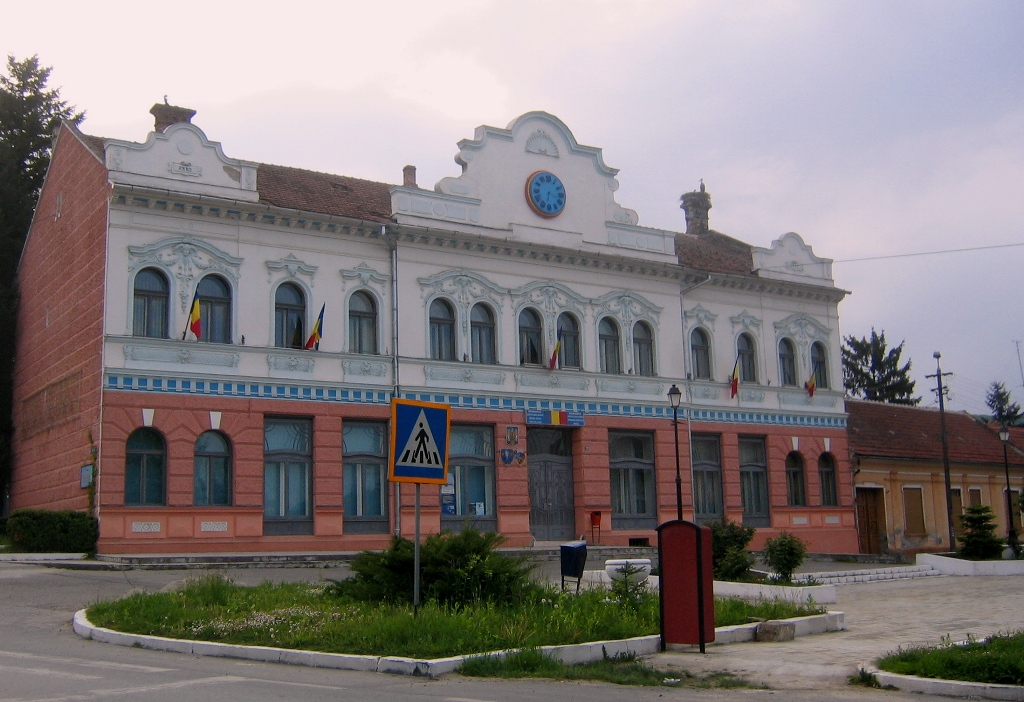
- Town Hall

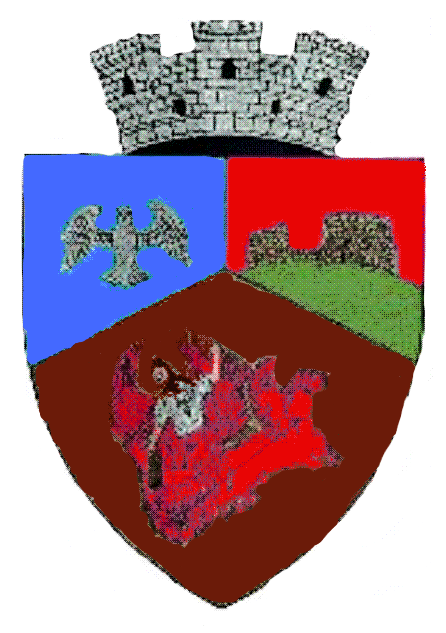
- Coat of arms

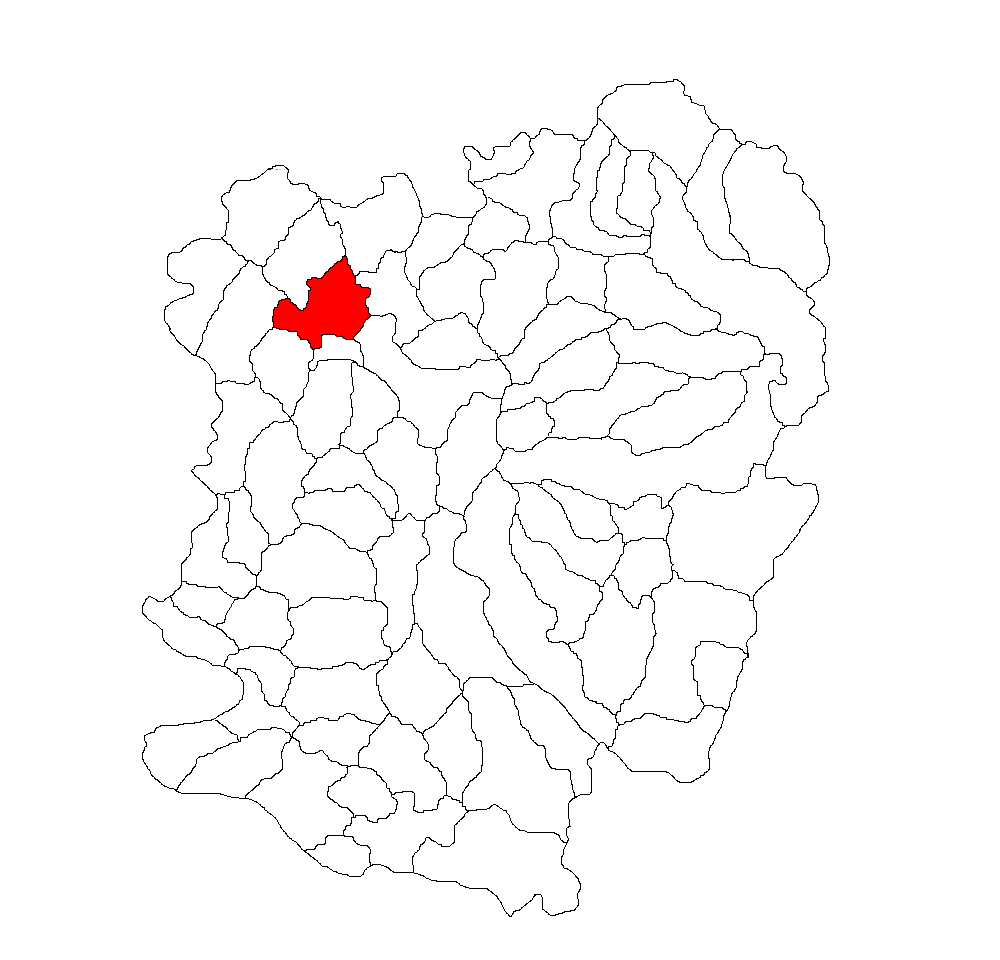
- Location in Caraș-Severin County

- Location in Romania
- Coordinates: 45°22′29″N 21°42′38″E
- Country: Romania
- County: Caraș-Severin

Government
  - Mayor (2024–2028): Patriciu Mirel Pascu (PSD)
- Area: 122.02 km^{2} (47.11 sq mi)
- Elevation: 159 m (522 ft)
- Population (2021-12-01): 12,949
  - Density: 106.12/km^{2} (274.85/sq mi)
- Time zone: UTC+02:00 (EET)
  - Summer (DST): UTC+03:00 (EEST)
- Postal code: 325300
- Area code: +(40) 0255
- Vehicle reg.: CS
- Website: orasulbocsa.ro

Bocșa (Romanian pronunciation: [ˈbokʃa]; Hungarian: Boksánbánya; German: Deutsch-Bokschan, Neuwerk) is a town in Caraș-Severin County, in the Banat region of Romania, with a population of 12,949 in 2021.

== Etymology ==
The name "Bocșa" is believed to originate from the Slavic word "bok," meaning "side" or "hill," which reflects the town's geographical location in a hilly region.

== Geography ==
The town is located in the southwestern part of Romania. The town has a length of 20.2 km (12.6 mi) and an area of approximately 675.9 ha (1,670 acres). It is located 80 km (50 mi) from Timișoara and 18 km (11 mi) from Reșița. and is traversed by the national road DN58B, which connects Reșița to Voiteg, in Timiș County. Bocșa lies on the banks of the Bârzava River. To the east lie the Western Carpathian Mountains, offering a mountainous environment rich in natural resources, particularly iron, copper, and other non-ferrous minerals. Directly to the east of Bocșa, the Pannonian Basin begins, featuring steppe-like landscapes.

== History ==
Bocșa has a long-standing development dating back to the Neolithic era. It has seen continuous habitation through the Bronze Age and Iron Age, and during Roman times, it was a site for gold exploitation. First mentioned in a document in 1331, Bocșa has experienced various occupations, including Austro-Hungarian and Ottoman rule. The town has a long tradition of mining, particularly for iron and copper. Mining activities date back to the 16th and 17th centuries under Turkish rule, where copper and iron were extracted. During the Habsburg period, Austrian miners revitalized the industry, establishing ironworks such as the "Altwerk" in 1719 and "Neuwerk" in 1722. These facilities processed iron ore from local sources, including the nearby Semenic Mountains and Lupac. The industrial development of Bocșa was further enhanced by the construction of a railway for industrial use in the 19th century and the establishment of a hydroelectric plant in 1896. Over time, the town transitioned to producing agricultural machinery, but mining remained a significant part of its economic history. Bocșa also became a cultural and educational hub, with diverse religious institutions due to successive waves of colonization.

== Demography ==
Historical population
Year	Pop.	±%
1966	16,015	—
1977	20,731	+29.4%
1992	19,152	−7.6%
2002	19,023	−0.7%
2011	15,842	−16.7%
2021	12,949	−18.3%
Source: Census data

At the 2002 census Bocșa had 19,023 inhabitants; of those, 15,041 were Romanians, 643 Roma, 596 Hungarians, 432 Germans, 64 Slovaks, 61 Serbs, 28 Ukrainians, and 17 Czechs. At the 2021 census, the town had a population of 12,949; of those, 75.02% were Romanians and 2.78% Roma.

== Natives ==
- Nicolae Bocșan (1947–2016), historian
- Vasile Ciocoi (born 1976), footballer
- Sorin Frunzăverde (1960–2019), politician
- Ilona Kerekes (1926–2023), Hungarian international table tennis player
- Constantin Lucaci (1923–2014), sculptor
- Roco Sandu (born 1966), footballer
- Sándor Szurmay (1860–1945), Hungarian military officer and politician

== Climate ==
Bocșa has a humid continental climate (Cfb in the Köppen climate classification).

Climate data for Bocșa
Month	Jan	Feb	Mar	Apr	May	Jun	Jul	Aug	Sep	Oct	Nov	Dec	Year
Mean daily maximum °C (°F)	3.8 (38.8)	5.9 (42.6)	11.1 (52.0)	16.8 (62.2)	21.3 (70.3)	24.6 (76.3)	26.6 (79.9)	26.9 (80.4)	21.7 (71.1)	16.6 (61.9)	11.2 (52.2)	4.9 (40.8)	15.9 (60.7)
Daily mean °C (°F)	0.2 (32.4)	1.8 (35.2)	6.3 (43.3)	11.7 (53.1)	16.3 (61.3)	19.9 (67.8)	21.8 (71.2)	21.9 (71.4)	17 (63)	11.7 (53.1)	6.9 (44.4)	1.6 (34.9)	11.4 (52.6)
Mean daily minimum °C (°F)	−3.1 (26.4)	−2.1 (28.2)	1.3 (34.3)	6 (43)	10.6 (51.1)	14.3 (57.7)	16.3 (61.3)	16.4 (61.5)	12.2 (54.0)	7.2 (45.0)	3.3 (37.9)	−1.5 (29.3)	6.7 (44.1)
Average precipitation mm (inches)	57 (2.2)	56 (2.2)	61 (2.4)	78 (3.1)	82 (3.2)	101 (4.0)	81 (3.2)	73 (2.9)	74 (2.9)	61 (2.4)	57 (2.2)	66 (2.6)	847 (33.3)
Source: https://en.climate-data.org/europe/romania/caras-severin/bocsa-10735/
