= Roco Sandu =

Romanian footballer

Personal information
- Full name: Roco Rafael Sandu
- Date of birth: 30 July 1966 (age 60)
- Place of birth: Bocșa, Romania
- Height: 1.76 m (5 ft 9 in)
- Position: Midfielder

Youth career
- –1985: Metalul Bocșa

Senior career*
Years	Team	Apps	(Gls)
1985–1988	Metalul Bocșa		
1989–1993	CSM Reșița	48	(3)
1994	Vega Caransebeș		
1994–1995	Politehnica Timișoara	28	(3)
1996	CFR Timișoara	20	(0)
1996–1999	CSM Reșița	64	(1)
Total		160	(7)

Managerial career
- 2010: Școlar Reșița
- 2012: FCM Reșița
- 2013: FCM Reșița
- 2015–2017: CSMȘ Reșița (youth)
- 2017: CSMȘ Reșița
- * Club domestic league appearances and goals as of 13 October 2017

Roco Sandu (born 30 July 1966) is a former Romanian professional footballer. He was part of one of the best football generation of CSM Reșița with players like Leontin Doană, Vasile Ciocoi or Cristian Chivu.
