= Cristian Pușcaș (footballer, born 1970) =

Romanian footballer

Personal information
- Date of birth: 9 November 1970 (age 55)
- Place of birth: Reșița, Romania
- Height: 1.88 m (6 ft 2 in)
- Position: Forward

Youth career
- –1988: CSM Reșița

Senior career*
Years	Team	Apps	(Gls)
1989–1993	CSM Reșița (Note: The statistics for the 1989–90, 1990–91 and 1991–92 seasons are unavailable.)	31	(6)
1993–1994	Dinamo București	36	(5)
1995	UTA Arad	9	(0)
1995–1996	CSM Reșița	29	(12)
1996	Jiul Petroșani	20	(6)
1997	Steaua București	5	(0)
1997–1998	Wuppertaler SV	2	(0)
1998–1999	Politehnica Iași	28	(7)
1999–2000	FSV Zwickau	12	(0)
2000	Oțelul Galați	0	(0)
2001	ASA Târgu Mureș	13	(5)
2001	Kecskemét	11	(2)
2004–2005	Auxerre Lugoj		
Total		196	(43)

Managerial career
- 2026: CSM Reșița (fitness coach)
- * Club domestic league appearances and goals

Cristian Pușcaș (born 9 November 1970) is a Romanian former professional footballer who played as a forward.

== Honours ==
CSM Reșița

- Divizia B: 1991–92

Steaua București

- Divizia A: 1996–97
- Cupa României: 1996–97
