= Piatra Tomii =

Late Jurassic limestone outcrop

Coordinates: 46°1′29.63″N 23°18′46.99″E

Piatra Tomii is a late Jurassic limestone outcrop forming a small hill near Răcătau village, Alba county, Romania. It is most well known for the Chalcolithic to Bronze Age flint mining settlement located on and near to the hill. The settlement is late Chalcolithic to Early Bronze Age. The people who occupied this site belonged to the Coțofeni culture (phase 3). The chief investigator of this archaeological site is Cristian Popa of the 1 Decembrie 1918 University, Alba Iulia. The artefact collection from this site are housed at the university in Alba Iulia. This site is significant as it is the first flint mine or quarry found so far in the Transylvanian basin. Petrographic analysis of the flint materials found at this site link it to artifacts found at prehistoric sites from throughout the Mures Valley leading researchers to believe that this site may have served an important role in the commerce of the Chalcolithic and Bronze Age. The large size of the settlement compared to its relative isolation high in the Apuseni Mountains tends to support this theory.

Although the majority of the artefacts so far found at the site are of Chalcolithic age, some researchers believe that the site may have already in use as a source of flint during the middle of the Neolithic by people of the Vinča culture. This is based on initial comparisons of Neolithic chipped stone artifacts to the geological material at Piatra Tomii. This theory has not yet been confirmed by the archaeological record for the middle Neolithic period, but during test pitting in 2009, Petrești type pottery was found at the site, indicating that the site was in use long prior to the arrival of the Coțofeni population (and possibly abandoned until the late Coțofeni people arrived). The potsherds were found in and next to a flint extraction pit along with axes and chisels and an ashy soil, suggesting that they were also extracting the flint. It is possible that the material used during earlier cultures of the Neolithic period may have come from another flint source very near to but not at Piatra Tomii itself. Since only a small percentage of this site has been excavated, it is also possible that remains of Vinča culture simply have not yet been found at Piatra Tomii.
