= Mihai Dăscălescu =

Romanian footballer

Personal information
- Full name: Mihai Valentin Dăscălescu
- Date of birth: 12 December 1976 (age 49)
- Place of birth: Hunedoara, Romania
- Height: 1.87 m (6 ft 2 in)
- Position: Forward

Team information
- Current team: Unirea Alba Iulia (chairman)

Youth career
- –1993: Corvinul Hunedoara

Senior career*
Years	Team	Apps	(Gls)
1993–1997	Corvinul Hunedoara	52	(11)
1997–1999	Astra Ploiești	59	(25)
1999–2000	Rapid București	21	(7)
2000–2003	Astra Ploiești	67	(13)
2003–2004	Petrolul Ploiești	25	(4)
2004	Brașov	16	(1)
2005	FC Ghimbav	1	(0)
2005–2006	Astra Ploiești	28	(8)
2006–2007	Corvinul Hunedoara	29	(10)
2007	Unirea Alba Iulia	9	(0)
2008	Minerul Lupeni	11	(2)
2009–2010	CS Zlatna	?	(?)
Total		318	(81)

Managerial career
- 2010: CS Zlatna
- 2011: FC Cisnădie
- 2014–2017: Unirea Alba Iulia
- * Club domestic league appearances and goals as of 24 January 2018

Mihai Valentin Dăscălescu (born 20 December 1976) is a Romanian former professional footballer who played as a forward. He played in the Liga I for: Astra Ploiești, Petrolul Ploiești and Brașov. Currently he is the chairman of Unirea Alba Iulia
