= Iosif Czako =

Romanian footballer

Iosif Czako / József Czakó
Personal information
- Date of birth: 11 June 1906
- Place of birth: Resicabánya, Austria-Hungary
- Date of death: 12 September 1966 (aged 60)
- Place of death: Reșița, Romania
- Height: 1.74 m (5 ft 9 in)
- Position: Defender

Senior career*
Years	Team	Apps	(Gls)
1928–1931	UDR Resita		
1934–1935	Crișana Oradea	10	(0)
1935–1936	CA Oradea	3	(0)

International career
1929–1930	Romania	2	(0)
- * Club domestic league appearances and goals

Iosif Czako (Romanian: Iosif Ciaco; 11 June 1906, in Reșița, Romania – 12 September 1966, in Reșița) was a Romanian football defender. His sons Ștefan and Gheorghe were also footballers, they played mostly at UTA Arad, Stefan was also a manager.

== Career ==
Iosif Czako made two appearances for the Romania, making his debut in a friendly which ended with a 3–2 victory against Bulgaria. He was part of Romania's squad at the 1930 World Cup playing in the second game, a 4–0 loss against hosts Uruguay, who eventually won the trophy.

== Honours ==
UDR Resita

- Divizia A (1): 1930–31
