= Cetate Stadium (Alba Iulia) =

Stadium in Romania

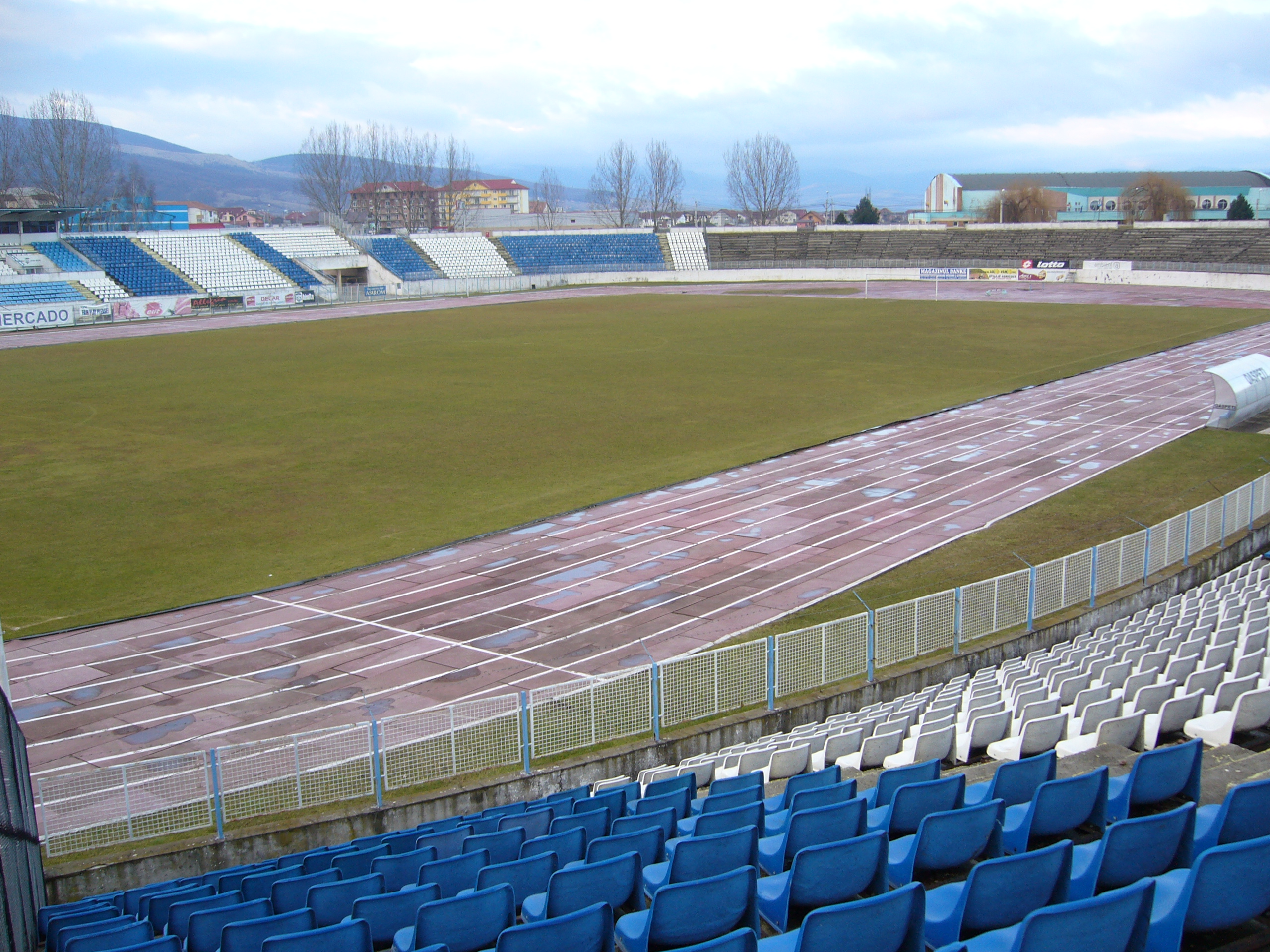
- The stadium in 2008
- Interactive map of Cetate Stadium
- Former names: Victoria-Cetate Stadium
- Address: Str. Septimus Severus, nr. 38A
- Location: Alba Iulia, Romania
- Coordinates: 46°04′44.68″N 23°33′59.59″E
- Owner: Municipality of Alba Iulia
- Operator: Unirea Alba Iulia
- Capacity: 18,000 (8,000 seated)
- Surface: Grass

Construction
- Opened: 1982
- Renovated: 2002, 2004

Tenant
- Unirea Alba Iulia (1982–present)

The Cetate Stadium is a multi-purpose stadium in Alba Iulia, Romania. It is currently used mostly for football matches and is the home ground of Unirea Alba Iulia. The stadium holds 18,000 people (8,000 seated).
