= CSM Reșița =

Romanian football club

- Full name: Asociația Club Sportiv; Muncitoresc Reșița
- Nicknames: Rossoneri (The Red and Blacks); Milan din Banat (Milan from Banat); Reșițenii (The Reșița People)
- Short name: CSM, Reșița
- Founded: 16 May 1926; 100 years ago (as UD Reșița); 2009; 17 years ago (as FC Școlar Reșița)
- Ground: Mircea Chivu
- Capacity: 12,500
- Owner: Reșița Municipality
- Chairman: Viorel Lolea
- Head coach: Dorinel Munteanu
- League: Liga II
- 2025–26: Liga II; Regular season: 8th of 22; Play-out, Group B: 3rd of 7
- Website: http://csm-resita.com/
Home colours	Away colours

Asociația Club Sportiv Muncitoresc Reșița (Romanian pronunciation: [ˌklubul sporˈtiv ˌmuŋtʃi.toˈresk ˈreʃit͡sa]), commonly known as CSM Reșița or simply as Reșița, is a professional football club based in Reșița, Caraș-Severin County, which competes in the Liga II.

The club was founded on 16 May 1926 as UD (Uzinele și Domeniile) Reșița and throughout its almost centennial history survived to many sharp ups and downs, from a national title in 1931 and a silver medal in 1932 to the last shine in the late 1990s, several reorganizations in the 2000s and an almost fatal fall at the level of amateur leagues during the 2010s.

Over time CSM had important battles with local rivals as Muncitorul Reșița or Gloria Reșița, but has secured itself the city's supremacy, as well as the title of county's most important and supported club. Despite the strong support from the Mountain Banat, Reșițenii have never succeeded in imposing themselves on a regional level, not even the national title won in 1931 or the 1954 cup not being able to tilt the balance in favor of "the red and blacks", in their duel for Banat against FC Politehnica Timișoara. In time the rivalry between the two sides increased as intensity and continued even after the bankruptcy of FC Politehnica, but now at a much lower level, against ASU Politehnica Timișoara, fans team and unofficial successor of the old white and violet side.

CSM Reșița is nicknamed by fans Rossoneri or Milan from Banat due to its classical red kits with black stripes. Reșița's supporters are well known in Romania for the eagerness with which support their team, the ultras group of CSM being named Guardia Ultra(GU). Rossoneri play their home matches on Mircea Chivu Stadium.

== History ==
A chart showing the progress of CSM Reșița through the Romanian football league system from 1934 to 2017.

The club was founded on 16 May 1926 from a merger between local teams Clubul Sportiv and Societatea Sportivă Muncitorească, the new team was named SS UDR (Sociatatea Sportivă a Angajaților Uzinelor de Fier și Domeniile din Reșița – "Sports Society of Employees of the Factories and Domains from Reșița"), the first coach of the team being native Ernest Loukota who also helped at the merger, the main starting 11 in the club's first year of activity being: Ștefan Czinczer – Szilágyi, Rech – Bundy, Andresz, Pecsenovszky – Grosz, Pázler, Lakatos, Adalbert Deșu, Keller.

In the 1930–31 season, UDR won the Romanian West League and qualified to the national finals, where it defeated with 2–0 Societatea Gimnastică Sibiu in the final after a double scored by Eugen Lakatos, coach Loukota using the following 11: Carol Damacsek – Alexandru Pomacsek, Györi – Sinko, Sepi, Jozsef Bundi – Fibișanu, Eugen Lakatos, Silviu Ploeșteanu, Jozsef Kilianovics, Moise. In the following season, the club reached again the championship final, losing it with 3–0 in front of Venus București, this time coach Loukota used the following players: Carol Damacsek – Iosif Czako, Györi – Sinko, Sepi – Jozsef Bundi, Kilianovics – Tudor, Silviu Ploeșteanu, Eugen Lakatos, Moise, Keller.

After World War II and the advent of the Communist regime, professional football was forbidden, UDR merged with a local labor union team, Locomotiva and was renamed Oțelul (Steel) Reșița and after several further name changes, it was ultimately branded Metalul Reșița.

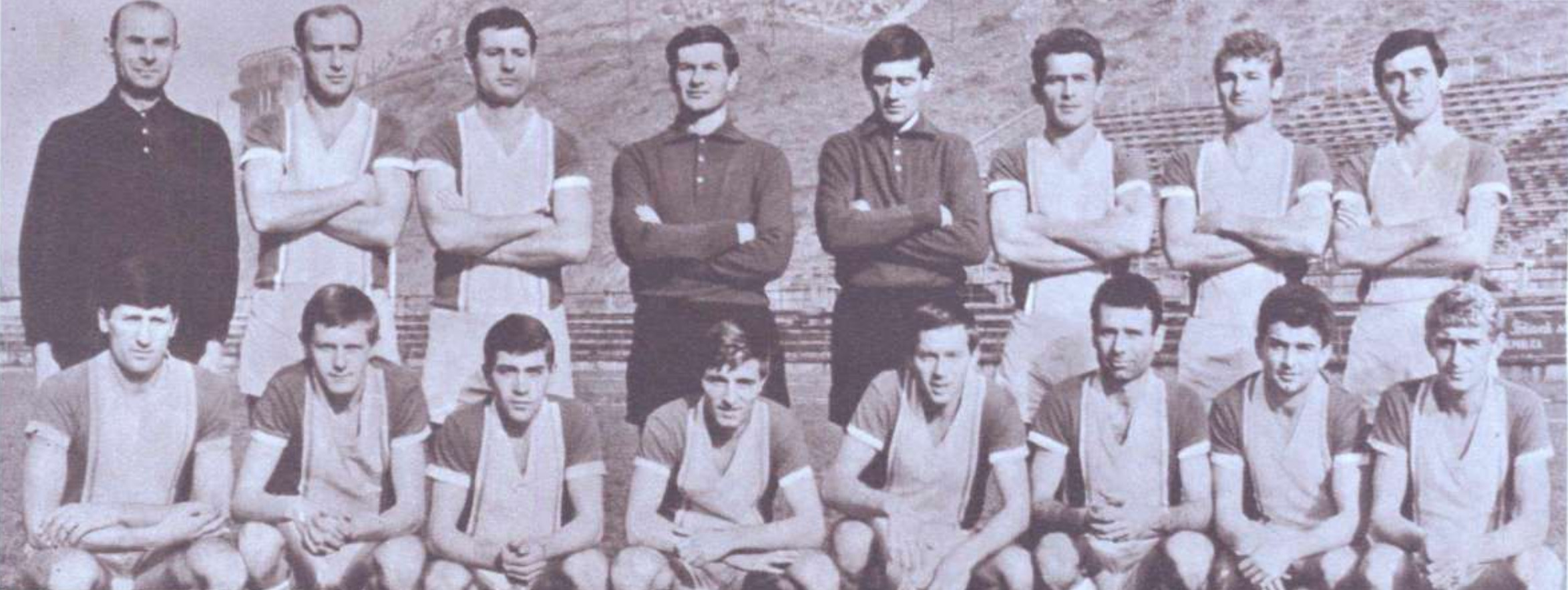
CSM Reșița squad in 1967

The 1950s were a period of slow decline for the club. By 1954, Metalul Reșița was playing in the Romanian second division, Divizia B, finishing the season in 7th place, however, the season also brought the club's second trophy, in the form of the 1954 Cupa României, this being the first time that a team from Divizia B had won the trophy after defeating five Divizia A teams, Știința Timișoara (6th place at the end of the 1954 Divizia A season) 5–1, Locomotiva Tg. Mureș (10th place) 4–0, Locomotiva Timișoara (4th place) 2–0, and CCA București (2nd place) 1–0 and a 2–0 victory in the final with Ștefan Szeleș scoring twice in the 30th and 40th minutes against Dinamo București (3rd place), coach Mihai Zsizsik using the following players in the final: Iosif Zarici – Emil Chirilă, Valentin Teodorescu, Eugen Potoceanu – Mihai Munteanu, Ștefan Apro – Iosif Jojart II, Petru Mioc, Ștefan Urcan, Petre Iovan (replaced by Vida in the 70th minute), Ștefan Szeleș.

In 1971, Ioan Reinhardt left UTA Arad to take charge of CSM Reșița. He guided the team to the 1971–72 Divizia B Series II title, securing its return to Divizia A after twenty-two years. The squad during the promotion campaign included Ilieș, Așa, Rednic, Kiss, Pîrvan, Kafka, Zimmer, Ambruș, Ticheli, Creștian, Varga, Grozăvescu, Stoia, Zsak, Sfîrlogea, Pușcaș, Atodiresei, Szilagyi, Florea, Păunescu, Dumitru and Roșca.

After relegation, FCM Reșița spent more than a decade in the second division, competing in Series III, finishing 3rd in 1978–79, 7th in 1979–80, 6th in 1980–81, and 10th in 1981–82. Renamed CSM Reșița in 1982, the club placed 7th in 1982–83, followed by back-to-back 3rd-place finishes in 1983–84 and 1984–85. It then finished 8th in 1985–86, 5th in 1986–87, and 5th again in 1987–88, a season in which it also enjoyed a notable Cupa României run, reaching the Round of 16 before losing 0–2 to Victoria București. Reșița narrowly avoided relegation in 1988–89, finishing 14th and surviving on goal difference, before improving to 4th place in 1989–90 and finishing 11th in 1990–91.

In the 1991–92 season, under head coach Carol Oțil, Reșița won Series II of Divizia B, finishing ahead of UTA Arad, which was deducted eight points following a match-fixing scandal related to the 24th-round match between Unirea Alba Iulia and UTA Arad, known as the ‘fur coat affair’, allowing the Red and Blacks to secure promotion to Divizia A after fourteen seasons in the second division. The squad was composed largely of young players, several of whom had come through the club's youth system. The promotion-winning squad included Gh. Popa, Boșca, Predulescu, Cojocaru II, Mărgineanțu, Lupu, Uțiu I, Moza, Bica, Șola, Panescu, Calofir, Sandu, Potocianu, Boltașiu, Cepoi, Doană, Despa, Cr. Alexandru, I. Szijj, Pușcaș, Büle II, Stroia, Petrescu, Lazarovici, D. Stănescu, Al. Marcă and Cl. Balaci.

In the 1992–93 season, CSM Reșița struggled in Divizia A, with the inexperienced side enduring a difficult first half of the campaign, including a heavy 0–9 defeat away to Steaua București. The team was also affected by coaching changes, with Ion Copăceanu initially in charge, followed by Dudu Georgescu and Dan Firițeanu, before Silviu Stănescu took over during the winter break. The arrival of Stănescu brought an improvement in results, with Reșița recording several victories against teams involved in the relegation battle. The highlight of the season came in the 23rd round, when CSM Reșița defeated unbeaten league leaders Steaua București 2–0 at Valea Domanului Stadium, with goals from Pușcaș and Cr. Alexandru. However, they finished last in Divizia A and were relegated to the second division after one season in the top flight. Rossoneri also reached the Round of 16 of the Cupa României, where they were eliminated by U Craiova 0–1 after extra time.

Following their relegation, Reșița competed in Series II of Divizia B, finishing 3rd in the 1993–94 season under head coach Carol Gall. Gall was dismissed after twelve rounds of the following campaign due to poor results and he was replaced by Mircea Secoșan, who was subsequently succeeded by Mircea Chivu during the winter break that led Reșița to finish 13th in 1994–95 season and 10th in the 1995–96 season, in which they also reached the round of 16 of the Cupa României, losing 0–1 to Dinamo București.

In the 1996–97 season, under head coach Victor Roșca and assistant coach Mircea Chivu, Reșița clinched the Series II title after a closely contested race against Electroputere Craiova. Before the final round, Reșița held a three-point lead with 70 points. In the decisive match in Craiova, Electroputere won 2–1, with Ciucur scoring for Reșița. Despite the defeat, Reșița secured the title and promotion to Divizia A, finishing tied on points with Electroputere but winning the title on head-to-head record, having won the home fixture 1–0. Reșița also had a good cup run in the Cupa României, eliminating two top-flight sides, Gloria Bistrița (1–0) and Farul Constanța (1–1, 3–2 on penalties), before losing 1–4 to Dinamo București in the quarter-finals.

Returning to the top flight for the 1997–98 season, Reșița were led by Ioan Sdrobiș for the first twenty rounds, during which they were eliminated from the Cupa României in the round of 32 after a 1–2 defeat to second-division side Apulum Alba Iulia, and Cristian Chivu made his Divizia A debut, having made one senior appearance in the second division the previous season. Sdrobiș subsequently left the team to take charge of Maramureș Baia Mare. Mircea Chivu took charge for one matchday before Silviu Stănescu led the team for the remainder of the campaign, guiding Reșița to a 7th-place finish, their best result during this period.

In the 1998–99 season, Stănescu began the campaign as head coach but was replaced by Sdrobiș after the third round. Under Sdrobiș, Reșița reached the Round of 16 of the Cupa României, where they lost 0–2 to Gloria Bistrița, one day after his departure. Aurel Șunda then took charge for the next three rounds before Victor Roșca managed Reșița to a 15th-place finish.

In the 1999–2000 season, Reșița struggled amid a succession of head coaches. Gabriel Stan was in charge for the first two rounds, followed by Viorel Vișan for the next two. Dan Firițeanu then took charge and led Reșița to the quarter-finals of the Cupa României, where they were eliminated by Oțelul Galați after a 1–2 defeat. Firițeanu remained in charge until the twenty-eighth round, before Vișan returned for the final six rounds, during which Reșița finished 17th and suffered relegation, bringing their three-season spell in the top flight to an end.

In Divizia B, Reșița competed in Series II and finished 3rd in the 2000–01 season, but growing financial difficulties led to businessman Dinel Staicu, who also owned U Craiova, taking control of the club by late 2001, a period during which Reșița finished 6th in 2001–02 and 11th in 2002–03. In August 2003, Staicu relinquished control of CSM Reșița, which was taken over by the Vatra trade union from the Reșița Steelworks. The club finished 14th in Series III of the 2003–04 season and was relegated to Divizia C. In 2004, as financial difficulties persisted, the club was dissolved, and its senior squad and Divizia C place were taken over by U Craiova’s reserve team.

In 2005, football was re-established in the city after the third division side Universitatea Reșița acquired the Divizia B place of Tricotaje Ineu, leading to the formation of FCM (Fotbal Club Municipal) Reșița. The team finished 5th in Series III of the 2005–06 season, under head coach Alexandru Pelici, and reached the Round of 32 in the Cupa României, where it was eliminated 0–1 by Rapid București at Stadionul Mircea Chivu Stadium. Following the restructuring of the second tier, Reșița was moved to Series II, where it finished 12th in the 2006–07 season and 15th in the 2007–08 season, resulting in relegation. In the 2008–09 season of Liga III, Reșița competed in Series V but was excluded in October 2008 due to severe financial difficulties and was subsequently dissolved.

Former logo, as CSM Școlar Reșița.

In the summer of 2009, the local Clubul Sportiv Școlar (School Sports Club) from Reșița established a senior team under the name FC Școlar Reșița, which was directly enrolled in the 2009–10 Liga III season by the Romanian Football Federation to fill vacant places created by teams withdrawing due to financial difficulties, finishing in 8th place under player-coach Lucian Dobre.

In the summer of 2010, the club was taken over by the Reșița Local Council and reorganised as a public institution, changing its name to CSM Școlar Reșița. It continued to compete in Series V of Liga III, finishing 8th in both the 2010–11 and 2011–12 seasons. In the summer of 2012, the club was renamed again, reverting to the historical name FCM Reșița, and appointed Gheorghe Barbu as the new head coach. However, he resigned after eight rounds and was replaced by Roco Sandu, who led the team to a 3rd-place finish in Series IV of the 2012–13 season.

In the summer of 2013, Damila Măciuca relocated to Reșița and was rebranded as Metalul Reșița, while the municipality of Reșița chose to support the new project. Following a 2013–14 season in which FCM Reșița finished 10th in the Series IV regular season and 8th after the series play-out stage, the club withdrew from Liga III due to the loss of financial support and was subsequently reformed in Liga IV Caraș-Severin County under the name CSM Școlar Reșița for the 2014–15 season, in which it finished as runners-up, two points behind Voința Lupac.

In 2015, relations between Metalul and the Municipality of Reșița cooled and the latter resumed its financial support for CSM Școlar. Metalul moved to Snagov in 2016 and was renamed a year later to Sportul Snagov. On the other hand, CSM Școlar was promoted back to Liga III at the end of the 2015–16 season, winning the Liga IV Caraș-Severin and the promotion play-off 6–1 away in the first leg and by forfeit in the second leg against Pandurii Cerneți, Mehedinți County winners. The squad, led by Dan Potocianu in the first half of the season and by Leontin Doană after the winter break, included, among others, Petruț, Domăneanț, Szijj, Banac, Covăsală, Coviț, Negrei, Costescu, Al. Ciucur, Breșneni, Bloju, Costachi, Liuba, V. Marcu, C. Doană, Țoțu, Beloescu, and Curelea.

In Liga III, Școlar Reșița competed under Leontin Doană and finished runners-up in Series IV in the 2016–17 season, just one point behind leaders Ripensia Timișoara. In the 2017–18 season, Roco Sandu was appointed as the new head coach. However, poor results led to his replacement by Daniel Oprița, who guided the team to another runners-up finish in Series IV, this time behind Șirineasa, and also led them to the Round of 32 of the Cupa României, where they faced Viitorul Constanța and lost 2–4.

In the 2018–19 season, Octavian Benga took charge of CSM Școlar Reșița, but after poor results that saw the Valea Domanului side drop from promotion contenders in Series IV closer to the relegation zone, he resigned after nine rounds and was replaced by Leontin Doană. Doană led the team to overcome the eight-point gap from before the winter break behind first-placed Șoimii Lipova, ultimately finishing two points ahead and securing promotion to the second tier after an eleven-year absence. The club also regained its traditional logo and name, being renamed CSM Reșița in the summer of 2019.

In the following campaign, Reșița reached the Round of 32 of the Cupa României, where it was eliminated by Universitatea Craiova after a 0–1 loss at Ion Oblemenco Stadium, with a lineup that included Zimmermann, L. Acka, Ehmann, Vasiu (Vlădia 67′), Banac, Săulescu, Danci, Cristea (Poiană 55′), Vădrariu, Dat (Cioablă 58′), and D. Ene. In the 2019–20 Liga II season, with the team in the relegation zone after sixteen rounds, Reșița parted ways with Leontin Doană, who was replaced by former Romanian international Dorinel Munteanu. Munteanu led the team to 15th place before the league was interrupted in March 2020 due to the COVID-19 pandemic.

Munteanu left Reșița during the summer of 2020, and Alexandru Pelici took charge for the 2020–21 campaign, but resigned after eight rounds due to poor results. He was replaced by Alin Minteuan, who in turn stepped down before the final round of the regular season, in which the team finished in 17th place. Subsequently, Adrian Falub was appointed as head coach, and after placing second from bottom in Group B of the play-out stage, Reșița returned to the third tier after two seasons in Liga II.

After relegation, Reșița appointed former Romanian international Dan Alexa as head coach for the 2021–22 Liga III campaign, aiming for a quick return to the second tier. The team won Series VII, finishing ten points clear at the end of the regular season and extending the gap to twenty points after the series play-off stage ahead of 2nd-placed Deva. Reșița qualified for the promotion play-offs, where it eliminated Ghiroda in the first round (1–0 away and 1–1 at home). In the decisive tie for promotion, however, the team was eliminated by Dumbrăvița, losing 2–4 on penalties after a 0–0 away draw and a 1–1 result at home, ending a season in which they went unbeaten in regular time.

Alexa did not continue as head coach and was replaced by Călin Cheregi. Under Cheregi, the Rossoneri reached the play-off round of the Cupa României but were eliminated after a 0–4 defeat to Mioveni. During the 2022–23 Liga III season, they went on to win Series VIII and qualified for the promotion play-offs, where they eliminated Filiași in the first round (2–2 away and 5–0 at home). In the decisive tie for promotion, Reșița defeated Deva with two 3–2 victories, securing promotion to the second tier after two years.

In the 2023–24 campaign, Reșița had a poor start to the season, losing both of their opening Liga II matches, and was also unexpectedly eliminated in the third round of the Cupa României after a 0–1 defeat to third-tier side Phoenix Buziaș, after which Călin Cheregi resigned. Flavius Stoican was subsequently appointed as head coach and led the team to 10th place in the regular season and first place in Group A of the play-out stage.

Reșița had a strong 2024–25 campaign, finishing 5th in the regular season and advancing to the promotion play-off stage, where it eventually finished 6th. The team also reached the group stage of the Cupa României, won Group D, and advanced to the quarter-finals for the first time in twenty-five years, where it was defeated 0–4 by Hermannstadt. The squad included, among others, Dincă, Goga, Élton, Dudea, Erico, Dolghi, Bocșan, Chera, Salhi, Tucaliuc, Cioiu, Gașpăr, Negru, Jerdea, Doană, Lascu, Samaké, Florescu, Fărăgău, and R. Burlacu.

In the 2025–26 season, the Red and Blacks were eliminated in the third round of the Cupa României after a 0–1 defeat to Liga III side Știința Poli Timișoara. Flavius Stoican left Reșița after nearly three years in charge following a 1–3 home defeat to Corvinul Hunedoara and the failure to secure a place in the top-six promotion play-off. Stoican was replaced by former Reșița player and club legend Leontin Doană, who guided the team to a 3rd-place finish in Group B of the play-out, concluding a disappointing campaign.

== Ground ==
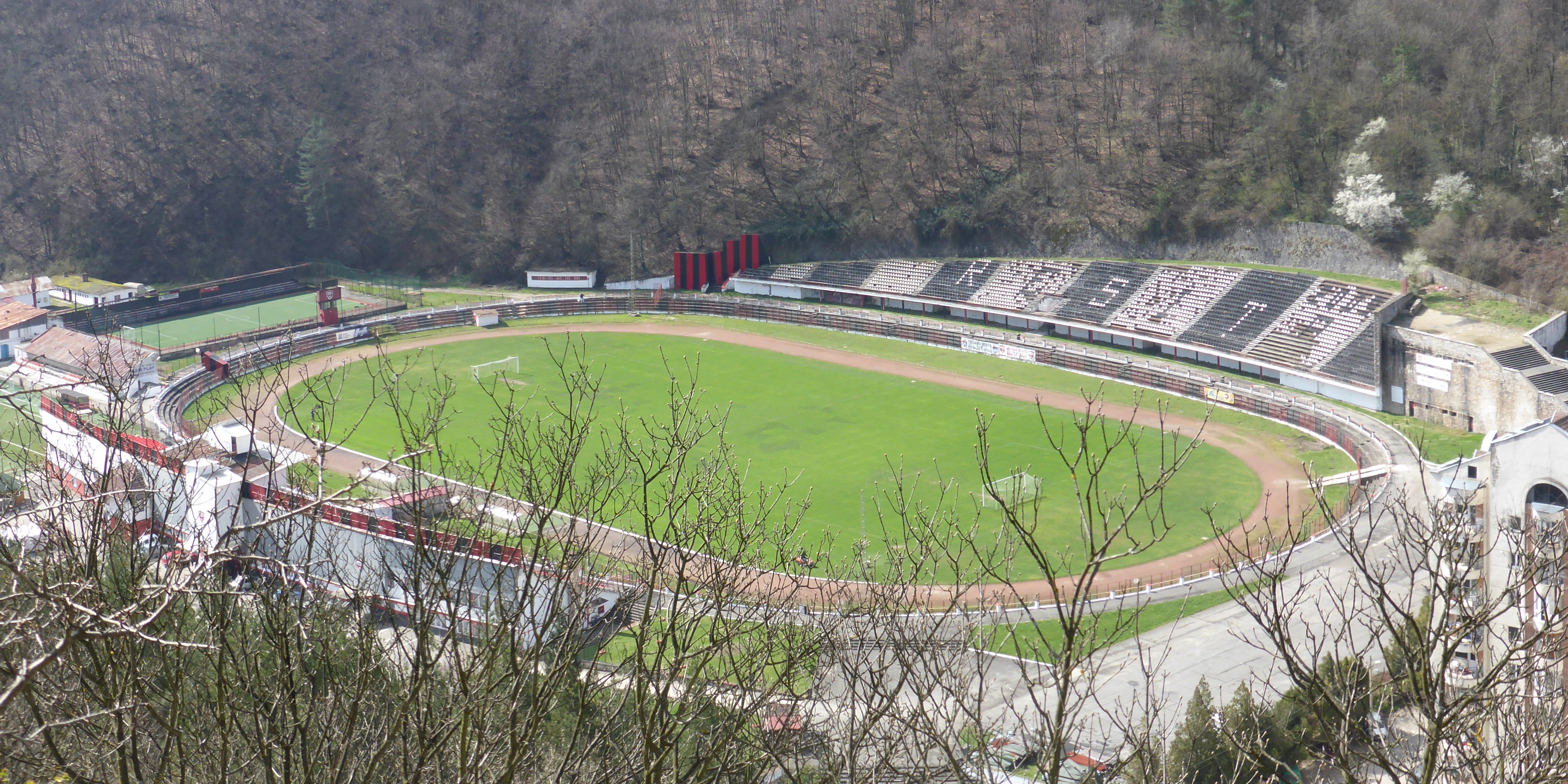
Mircea Chivu Stadium.

CSM Reșița plays its home matches at Mircea Chivu Stadium, a sports complex named after manager Mircea Chivu, who was also the father of player Cristian Chivu. With a capacity of 12,500 seats, the stadium is located in the Domanului Valley neighbourhood. It was opened in the 1920s and has been renovated several times, most recently in 2018 and 2020.

== Honours ==
=== Leagues ===
Divizia A / Liga I

- Winners (1): 1930–31
- Runners-up (1): 1931–32

Divizia B / Liga II

- Winners (4): 1937–38, 1971–72, 1991–92, 1996–97
- Runners-up (5): 1948–49, 1961–62, 1962–63, 1963–64, 1968–69

Divizia C / Liga III

- Winners (4): 1936–37, 2018–19, 2021–22, 2022–23
- Runners-up (2): 2016–17, 2017–18

Liga IV – Caraș-Severin

- Winners (1): 2015–16
- Runners-up (1): 2014–15

=== Cups ===
Cupa României

- Winners (1): 1954

Cupa României – Caraș-Severin

- Winners (1): 2014–15

== Players ==
=== First-team squad ===
As of 16 October 2026

Note: Flags indicate national team as defined under FIFA eligibility rules; some limited exceptions apply. Players may hold more than one non-FIFA nationality.

No.	Pos.	Nation	Player
1	GK	ROU	Gabriel Ursu
2	DF	ROU	Robert Vișan
4	MF	MAR	Ouadie Salhi (Vice-captain)
5	DF	ROU	Alin Dudea (Captain)
6	DF	ROU	Claudiu Apro (4th captain)
7	MF	ROU	Vlad Chera
8	MF	ROU	Andrei Dima
9	FW	SRB	Stefan Višić
11	MF	ROU	Alexandru Negru
12	GK	ROU	Mihai Traia
14	DF	ROU	Darius Beșca
15	DF	ROU	Sergiu Rimovecz
17	DF	ROU	Erwin Bloj
18	MF	ROU	Aris Tudor
19	FW	BIH	Stefan Šavija

No.	Pos.	Nation	Player
20	FW	ROU	Edmond Lenghel (on loan from Interstar Sibiu)
21	MF	SLO	Matic Zavnik
22	MF	ROU	Cristian Bărbuț
23	FW	ROU	David Pop
24	DF	ROU	Ianis Droană
25	MF	ROU	Ioan Boșneag
28	MF	ROU	Marco Lazarovici
29	MF	ROU	Filip Bîcleșanu
30	FW	CMR	Franck Tchassem
31	MF	NGR	Lawal Sulaimon
40	MF	ROU	Cristian Chira (3rd captain)
44	DF	SRB	Dušan Mijić
77	GK	ROU	Iustin Popescu
99	MF	ROU	Lucian Buzan

== Club officials ==
=== Board of directors ===
Role	Name
Owner	(Romania) Reșița Municipality
President	(Romania) Viorel Lolea
Sporting director	(Romania) Adrian Ciocan
Head of Youth Development	(Romania) Boșco Vișatovici
Secretary	(Romania) Daniela Banu
Contability	(Romania) Monica Sabolovits
Team Manager	(Romania) Laurențiu Breșneni
Press Officer	(Romania) Miruna Mihancea

=== Current technical staff ===
Role	Name
Head coach	(Romania) Dorinel Munteanu
Assistant coach	(Romania) Dorin Toma
Goalkeeping coach	(Romania) Iulian Olteanu
Fitness coach	(Romania) Laurențiu Iorga
Club doctor	(Romania) Ioan Șerbescu
Kinetotherapist	(Romania) Ionuț Șotea
Storeman	(Romania) Flavius Toader

== Chronology of names ==
Name	Period
UD Reșița	1926–1948
Oțelul Reșița	1947–1948
Metalochimic Reșița	1948–1949
Metalul Reșița	1950–1956
Energia Reșița	1956–1957
CSM Reșița	1957–1974
FCM Reșița	1974–1982
CSM Reșița	1982–2005
FCM Reșița	2005–2008
CSM Școlar Reșița	2008–2012
FCM Reșița	2012–2014
CSM Școlar Reșița	2014–2019
CSM Reșița	2019–

== League and cup history ==
Season	Tier	League	Regular season	Play-off / Play-out	Notes	Cupa României
2025–26	2	Liga II	8th	3rd (Group B play-out)		Play-off round
2024–25	2	Liga II	5th	6th (play-off)		Quarter-finals
2023–24	2	Liga II	10th	1st (Group A play-out)		Third round
2022–23	3	Liga III	1st (Series VIII)	1st (C) (Series VIII)	Promoted	Play-off round
2021–22	3	Liga III	1st (Series VII)	1st (C) (Series VII)		Fourth round
2020–21	2	Liga II	17th	6th (Group B play-out)	Relegated	Third round
2019–20	2	Liga II	15th	–		Round of 32
2018–19	3	Liga III	1st (C) (Series IV)	–	Promoted	Third round
2017–18	3	Liga III	2nd (Series IV)	–		Round of 32
2016–17	3	Liga III	2nd (Series IV)	–		
2015–16	4	Liga IV (CS)	1st (C)	–	Promoted	Second round
2013–14	3	Liga III	8th (Series IV)	–	Withdrew	Second round
2012–13	3	Liga III	3rd (Series IV)	–		Second round
2011–12	3	Liga III	8th (Series V)	–		Fourth round
2010–11	3	Liga III	8th (Series V)	–		Second round
2009–10	3	Liga III	8th (Series V)	–		First round
2008–09	3	Liga III	17th (Series V)	–		First round
2007–08	2	Liga II	15th (Series II)	–	Relegated	
2006–07	2	Liga II	12th (Series II)	–		
2005–06	2	Divizia B	5th (Series III)	–		Round of 32
2004–05	Not active					
2003–04	2	Divizia B	14th (Series III)	–	Relegated	
2002–03	2	Divizia B	11th (Series II)	–		Round of 32
2001–02	2	Divizia B	6th (Series II)	–		Round of 16
2000–01	2	Divizia B	3rd (Series II)	–		Round of 32
1999–00	1	Divizia A	17th	–	Relegated	Quarter-finals
1998–99	1	Divizia A	15th	–		Round of 16
1997–98	1	Divizia A	7th	–		Round of 32
1996–97	2	Divizia B	1st (C) (Series II)	–	Promoted	Quarter-finals
1995–96	2	Divizia B	10th (Series II)	–		Round of 32
1994–95	2	Divizia B	13th (Series II)	–		
1993–94	2	Divizia B	3rd (Series II)	–		
1992–93	1	Divizia A	18th	–	Relegated	Round of 16
1991–92	2	Divizia B	1st (C) (Series II)	–	Promoted	
1990–91	2	Divizia B	11th (Series III)	–		
1989–90	2	Divizia B	4th (Series III)	–		

== Notable former players ==
The footballers enlisted below have had international cap(s) for their respective countries at junior and/or senior level and/or significant caps for CSM Reșița.

Romania

- (Romania) Ion Atodiresei
- (Romania) Silviu Bălace
- (Romania) Ștefan Bărboianu
- (Romania) Aurel Beldeanu
- (Romania) Dean Beța
- (Romania) Valentin Boșca
- (Romania) Laurențiu Breșneni
- (Romania) Andrei Burlacu
- (Romania) Cristian Chivu
- (Romania) Marius Cioiu
- (Romania) Valentin Ciucur
- (Romania) Vasile Ciocoi
- (Romania) Victor Cojocaru
- (Romania) Iosif Czako
- (Romania) Ovidiu Dănănae
- (Romania) Vasile Deheleanu
- (Romania) Adalbert Deșu
- (Romania) Ciprian Dianu
- (Romania) Leontin Doană
- (Romania) Lucian Dobre
- (Romania) Marian Drăghiceanu
- (Romania) Ion Florea
- (Romania) Nicușor Fota
- (Romania) Mihai Gabel
- (Romania) Florin Gașpăr
- (Romania) Dudu Georgescu
- (Romania) Ion Goanță
- (Romania) Gheorghe Gornea
- (Romania) Ion Ibric
- (Romania) Ioan Ilieș
- (Romania) Ștefan Iovan
- (Romania) Robert Jerdea
- (Romania) Stanislau Konrad
- (Romania) Eugen Lakatos
- (Romania) Daniel Lupașcu
- (Romania) Cicerone Manolache
- (Romania) Lucian Marinescu
- (Romania) Dorinel Munteanu
- (Romania) Dorel Mutică
- (Romania) Cătălin Necula
- (Romania) Răducanu Necula
- (Romania) George Ogăraru
- (Romania) Daniel Oprița
- (Romania) Basarab Panduru
- (Romania) Alexandru Pelici
- (Romania) Marcel Pigulea
- (Romania) Silviu Ploeșteanu
- (Romania) Dan Potocianu
- (Romania) Cristian Pușcaș
- (Romania) Adalbert Rech
- (Romania) Laurențiu Rus
- (Romania) Roco Sandu
- (Romania) Cristian Scutaru
- (Romania) Gavril Serfözö
- (Romania) (Hungary) Francisc Spielmann
- (Romania) Iosif Szijj
- (Romania) Ion Timofte
- (Romania) Florea Voinea
- (Romania) Cristian Zimmermann
- (Romania) Dorin Zotincă

Brazil

- (Brazil) Élton
- (Brazil) Erico

== Former managers ==
- (Romania) Ernest Loukota (1926–1932)
- (Romania) Rudolf Wetzer (1940–1947)
- (Romania) Mihai Zsizsik (1947)
- (Romania) Mihai Zsizsik (1954)
- (Romania) Ladislau Zilahi (1960–1962)
- (Romania) Ștefan Coidum (1964–1966)
- (Romania) Ioan Reinhardt (1971–1977)
- (Romania) Ion Motroc (1977–1978)
- (Romania) Cicerone Manolache (1978–1979)
- (Romania) Ion V. Ionescu (1979)
- (Romania) Cicerone Manolache (1980–1981)
- (Romania) Dan Firițeanu (1983–1984)
- (Romania) Carol Oțil (1986–1987)
- (Romania) Traian Ionescu (1987–1989)
- (Romania) Dănilă Otiman (1989–1990)
- (Romania) Dan Firițeanu (1990–1991)
- (Romania) Carol Oțil (1991–1992)
- (Romania) Ion Copăceanu (1992)
- (Romania) Dudu Georgescu (1992)
- (Romania) Dan Firițeanu (1992)
- (Romania) Silviu Stănescu (1993)
- (Romania) Carol Gall (1993–1994)
- (Romania) Mircea Secoșan (1994)
- (Romania) Mircea Chivu (1995–1996)
- (Romania) Victor Roșca (1996–1997)
- (Romania) Ioan Sdrobiș (1997)
- (Romania) Mircea Chivu (1998) (interim)
- (Romania) Silviu Stănescu (1998)
- (Romania) Ioan Sdrobiș (1998)
- (Romania) Aurel Șunda (1998) (interim)
- (Romania) Victor Roșca (1999)
- (Romania) Gabriel Stan (1999)
- (Romania) Viorel Vișan (1999) (interim)
- (Romania) Dan Firițeanu (1999–2000)
- (Romania) Viorel Vișan (2000) (interim)
- (Romania) Costică Ștefănescu (2000–2001)
- (Romania) Nicolae Negrilă (2003–2004)
- (Romania) Alexandru Pelici (2005–2006)
- (Romania) Victor Roșca (2006–2007)
- (Romania) Alexandru Pelici (2007)
- (Romania) Ioan Balaur (2007–2008)
- (Romania) Dan Potocianu (2008)
- (Romania) Lucian Dobre (2009–2010)
- (Romania) Roco Sandu (2010)
- (Romania) Flavius Stoican (2010–2011)
- (Romania) Leontin Doană (2011–2012)
- (Romania) Gheorghe Barbu (2012)
- (Romania) Roco Sandu (2012)
- (Romania) Roco Sandu (2013)
- (Romania) Leontin Doană (2013–2014)
- (Romania) Dan Potocianu (2014–2016)
- (Romania) Leontin Doană (2016–2017)
- (Romania) Roco Sandu (2017)
- (Romania) Daniel Oprița (2017–2018)
- (Romania) Octavian Benga (2018)
- (Romania) Leontin Doană (2018–2019)
- (Romania) Dorinel Munteanu (2019–2020)
- (Romania) Alexandru Pelici (2020)
- (Romania) Alin Minteuan (2020–2021)
- (Romania) Adrian Falub (2021)
- (Romania) Dan Alexa (2021–2022)
- (Romania) Călin Cheregi (2022–2023)
- (Romania) Flavius Stoican (2023–2026)
- (Romania) Leontin Doană (2026–present)
