= Eduard Cristian Zimmermann =

Romanian footballer

Cristian Zimmermann
Personal information
- Full name: Eduard Cristian Zimmermann
- Date of birth: 18 April 1983 (age 43)
- Place of birth: Reșița, Romania
- Height: 1.83 m (6 ft 0 in)
- Position: Goalkeeper

Youth career
- –2002: CSM Reșița

Senior career*
Years	Team	Apps	(Gls)
2002–2003	CSM Reșița		
2003–2011	Politehnica Timișoara	12	(0)
2007	→ FCM Reșița (loan)	17	(0)
2008	→ CS Buftea (loan)	17	(0)
2009	→ Gloria Buzău (loan)	8	(0)
2009	→ Drobeta-Turnu Severin (loan)	11	(0)
2010	→ Otopeni (loan)	17	(0)
2011–2012	Petrolul Ploiești	20	(0)
2013	SSV Reutlingen	0	(0)
2014–2016	Metalul Reșița	70	(0)
2016–2023	CSM Reșița	130	(0)
Total		299	(0)

Managerial career
- 2021–2023: CSM Reșița (player/GK coach)
- 2023–2026: CSM Reșița (GK coach)
- * Club domestic league appearances and goals

Eduard Cristian Zimmermann (born 18 April 1983) is a Romanian former professional footballer who played as a goalkeeper.

== Honours ==
Petrolul Ploiești

- Liga II: 2010–11

Politehnica Timișoara

- Cupa României runner-up: 2006–07

CSM Reșița

- Liga III: 2018–19, 2021–22, 2022–23
