= CSM Unirea Alba Iulia =

Association football team in Romania

- Full name: Clubul Sportiv Municipal Unirea Alba Iulia
- Nicknames: Uniriștii (Unionists); Albaiulienii (The Alba Iulia People); Alb-negrii (The White and Blacks)
- Short name: Unirea Alba Iulia
- Founded: 16 August 1924; 102 years ago as Club Sportiv Muncitoresc Alba Iulia; 2014; 12 years ago (refounded)
- Ground: Cetate
- Capacity: 18,000
- Owners: Alba Iulia Municipality
- Chairman: Mihai Dăscălescu
- Head coach: Cristian Pustai
- League: Liga III
- 2025–26: Liga III, Seria IV, 2nd
- Website: www.unireafc.ro
Home colours	Away colours

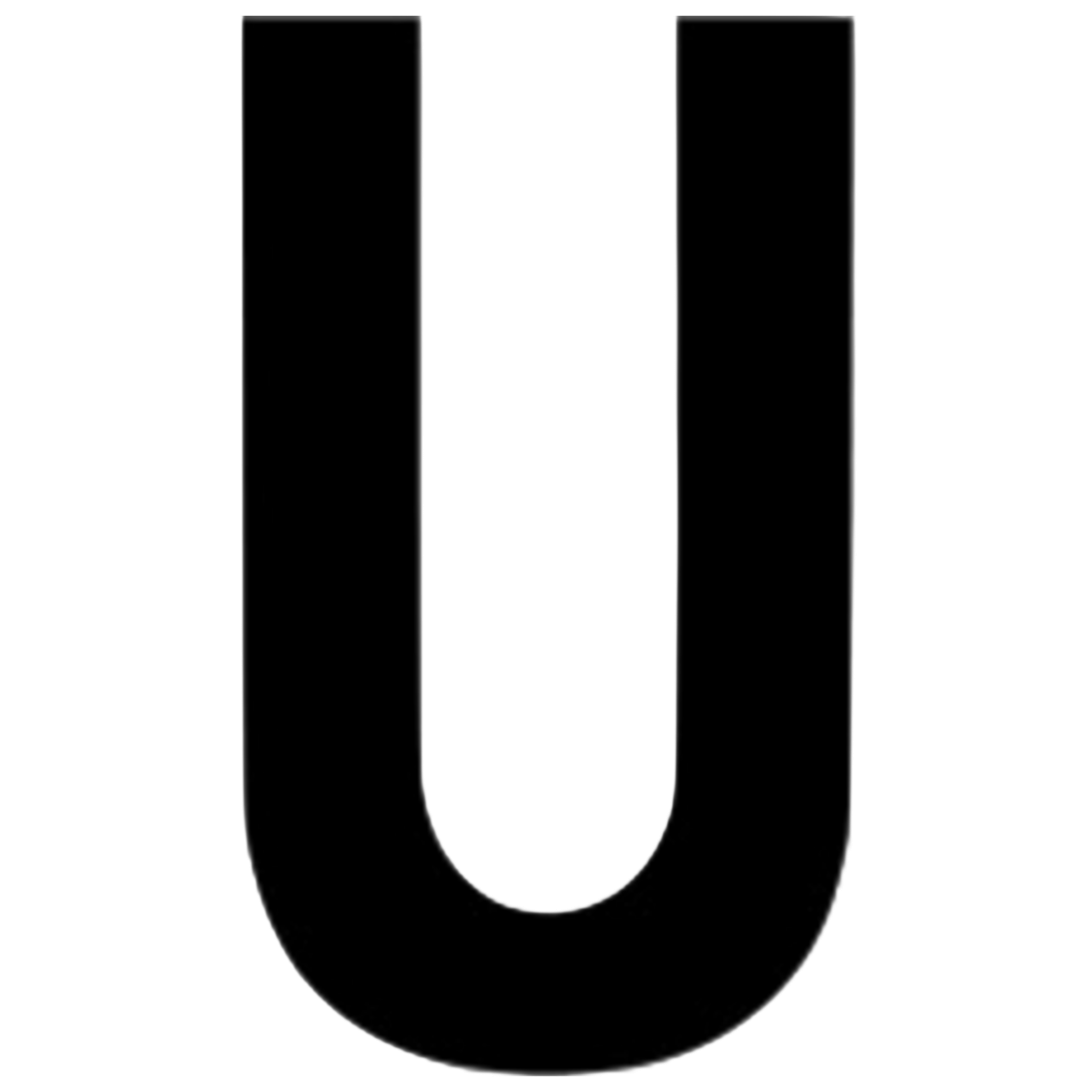
Logo 1925-1934

Clubul Sportiv Municipal Unirea Alba Iulia, commonly known as Unirea Alba Iulia (Romanian pronunciation: [uˈnire̯a ˌalba ˈjuli.a]), is a Romanian professional football club based in Alba Iulia, Alba County, founded in 1924 and currently playing in the Liga III.

The team from Cetatea Marii Uniri (lit. 'The Citadel of Great Union') plays in black and white, and its home ground is Cetate Stadium (lit. 'Citadel'), which has a capacity of 18,000 seats. Among the club’s greatest achievements are a 6th-place finish in the Romanian top division at the end of the 2003–04 season, and reaching the semi-finals in 1990–91 and the quarter-finals in 2024–25 of the Romanian Cup.

== History ==
Unirea Alba Iulia was founded in 1924. In the beginning the team was called Unirea Mihai Viteazul Alba Iulia. After ten years, they managed to qualify and play in the second division where they managed to obtain the 6th place.

They played in the second division until the year 1939 when they were relegated to the third league. In 1942, they returned to the second league where they played two seasons and then were relegated again. At the end of season 1946–1947 we find the team in the third league in a relegating position. From 1947 until 1970 the team plays in the regional championships, under the level of the first three leagues of Romanian professional football.

Unirea won the Alba County Championship in the 1968–69 season, but lost the promotion play-off against Electromotor Timișoara, winners of the Timiș County Championship, after a 2–2 draw at home and a 0–4 defeat away. In the 1969–70 season, Unirea claimed the Alba County Championship for the second consecutive time and secured promotion to Divizia C, after defeating Gloria Arad, the Arad County Championship winners, 2–0 at home, following a 0–1 loss away. The squad, coached by Gheorghe Tîrnoveanu, included Frîncu, Vasiu, Tőkés, Suciu, Strențan, Crăciuneac, Filip, Crișan, Bimbea, Popa, Moldovan, Doba, Baksi, Sima, and Mărgean.

After nine seasons played in the third division, they managed to promote in the second division. In the season 1979–80 the team finished in the first spot beyond the relegation line.

They played another four years in the third division, after that, they promoted in the second division where they played for two years and were relegated again, and after another two years they promoted again.

Between 1988 and 2003 seasons they played in the second league. In the 1990–91 Cupa României edition the team reached the semi-finals and in the 1993–94 Divizia B season they placed themselves on the second position at only 7 points behind the first place FC Maramureş Baia Mare, both performances being obtained under coach Cornel Țălnar.

At the end of the 2002–2003 season of Divizia B, the team, which was renamed in the `90s Apulum Alba Iulia, manages to achieve the promotion to Liga I, where it plays for the very first time in its 80-year history. The coach who led the team was Aurel Șunda assisted by Alexandru Pelici.

After a very weak season in the second league, the team was relegated again, this time to the third league. In the summer of 2006, the management of the club buys a place in the second league from Oltchim Râmnicu Vâlcea. The team returns to the name of Unirea Alba Iulia and finishes the 2006–2007 and 2007–2008 seasons on 4th. The club withdrew from the 2012–13 Liga II season and ceased its activity for a year. In the summer of 2014 it enrolled in the Liga V – Alba County for the 2014–15 season, after one season the club promoted in Liga IV – Alba County.

Name	Period
Unirea Mihai Viteazu	1924–1970
Unirea Alba Iulia	1970–1996
Apulum Alba Iulia	1996–2005
Unirea Alba Iulia	2005–present

On 25 August 2016, the club accepted invitation of Romanian Football Federation to participate in the 2016–17 season of the Liga III due to the excellent results recorded in the youth championships.

Unirea appointed Valentin Sinescu as head coach for the 2021–22 campaign, which was marked by severe financial difficulties. The White and Blacks were bottom of Series IX after fifteen rounds of the regular season, and Sinescu left the club in December, leaving assistant coach Marcel Rusu in charge. Under Rusu’s guidance, the team finished the season in 9th place after the play-out stage, resulting in relegation to the fourth tier.

Despite this setback, Unirea managed to bounce back the following campaign, continuing to play in Liga III after being spared relegation due to the financial collapse of other clubs. Marcel Rusu was retained as head coach, leading the Unionists to finish 4th in the regular season and 3rd in the play-off stage of Series IX, following a fierce battle with Unirea Ungheni for a place in the promotion play-off.

On 9 August 2023, the Alba Iulia City Hall announced that the Local Council had approved the takeover and management of AFC Unirea 1924 by the Municipal Sports Club (CSM), with the team benefiting from the support of the local authorities. Stelian Gherman was subsequently named head coach for the 2023–24 season, but his tenure proved short, as he was dismissed after five rounds. Following a brief interim period under Marcel Rusu, Alexandru Pelici was appointed on 1 November. Pelici led the Unionists to a 5th-place finish after the regular and play-out stages of Series IX.

In the 2024–25 campaign, Unirea competed in Series VII, finishing 2nd, two points ahead of local rivals CSU Alba Iulia, thereby qualifying for the promotion play-offs, where it was eliminated in the first round by SCM Râmnicu Vâlcea, losing on penalty shoot-outs after a 1–0 home victory and a 0–1 away defeat. The White and Blacks also reached the Group stage of the Cupa României, finishing 2nd in Group D with a 1–0 victory over Sepsi Sfântu Gheorghe, a 0–0 draw with Csíkszereda Miercurea Ciuc, and a 3–1 win against SCM Râmnicu Vâlcea, followed by a 0–1 loss to CSM Reșița in the tie-breaker for first place, before suffering a 0–3 defeat to Farul Constanța in the quarter-finals. The squad led by Alexandru Pelici included, among others, D. Roman, Bucur, Ardei, Balaur (cpt.), Vomir, Călugăr, Giosu, Fetița, Giurgiu, Agbomoniyi, Ardeiu, R. Nistor, Pintea, Vl. Stanciu, S. Ion, Istrate, Voinea, Roșu, Indrei, and D. Nistor.

== Stadium ==
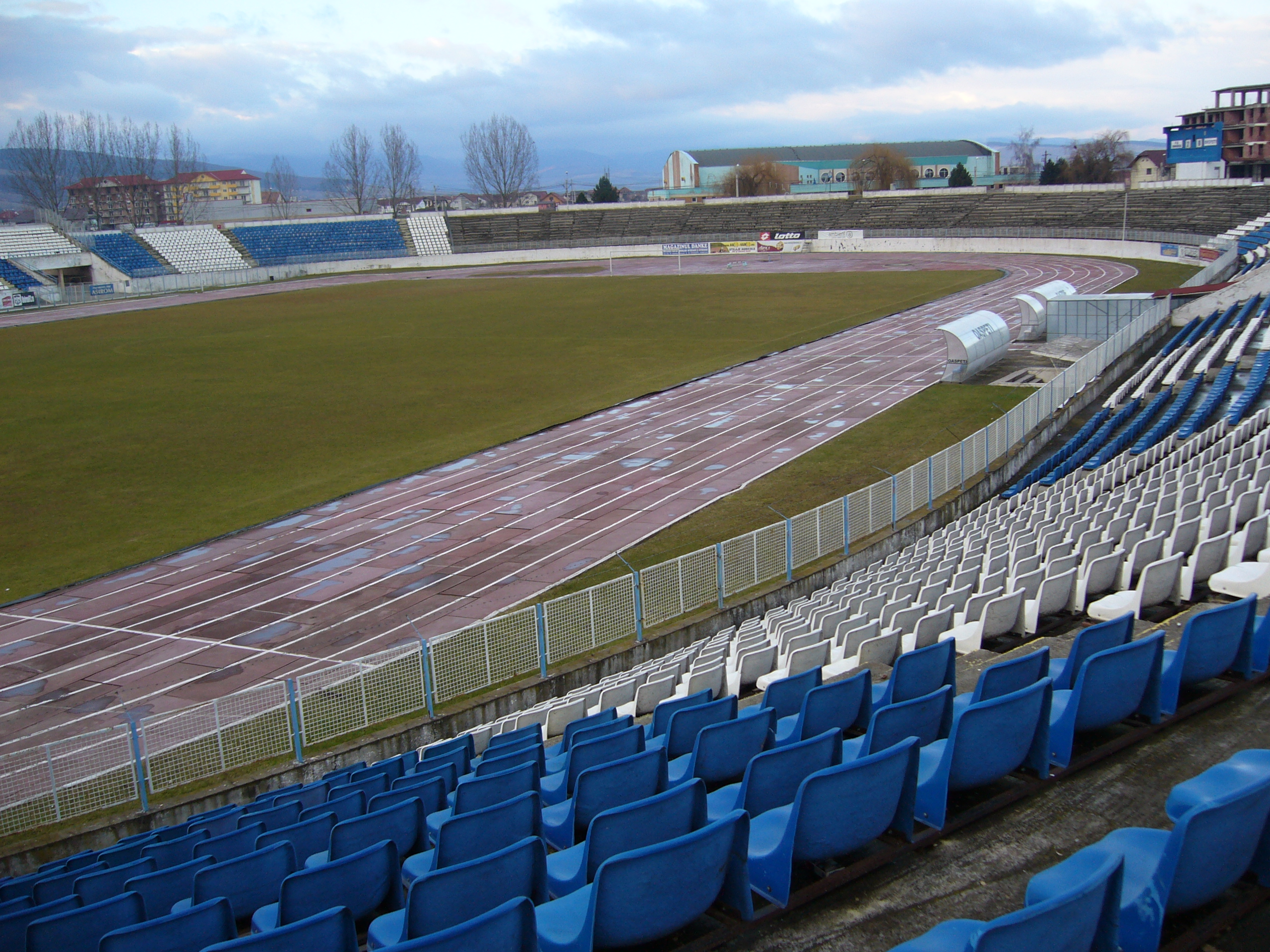
Cetate Stadium in 2008

The English translation of the name of the club's stadium is Citadel (Cetate), and it has a capacity of 18,000(7,000 sitting). The stadium was opened in 1982. For the moment the stadium belongs to the municipality, all investments are done with funds provided by it. The stadium has also a mini-hotel in which the players are accommodated, and also a running track.

== Honours ==
=== Domestic ===
==== Leagues ====
- Liga I
  - Best finish 6th: 2003–04
- Liga II
  - Winners (2): 2002–03, 2008–09
  - Runners-up (1): 1993–94
- Liga III
  - Winners (3): 1978–79, 1983–84, 1987–88
  - Runners-up (2): 1981–82, 2025–26
- Liga IV – Alba County
  - Winners (2): 1968–69, 1969–70
- Liga V – Alba County
  - Winners (1): 2014–15

==== Cups ====
- Cupa României
  - Semi-finals: 1990–91

== Players ==
=== First team squad ===
Note: Flags indicate national team as defined under FIFA eligibility rules; some limited exceptions apply. Players may hold more than one non-FIFA nationality.

No.	Pos.	Nation	Player
1	GK	ROU	Bogdan Ștefan
12	GK	ROU	Darius Roman
13	GK	ROU	Ianis Herlea
4	DF	ROU	Ionuț Balaur
5	DF	ROU	Denis Giosu
6	DF	ROU	Cornel Ardei
7	DF	ROU	Tudor Vomir
8	DF	ROU	Alexandru Ondreykovicz
3	DF	ROU	Alexandru Giurgiu
10	MF	ALB	Amir Jorza
11	MF	ROU	Andrei Gavrilă
14	MF	ROU	Paulian Banu
15	MF	ROU	Valentin Ardeiu
16	MF	ROU	Vlad Lambru
17	MF	ROU	Rareș Stanciu
18	MF	ROU	Bogdan Szijj
19	MF	ROU	Răzvan Pîntea
20	MF	ROU	Valentin Borcea

No.	Pos.	Nation	Player
21	FW	ROU	Răzvan Fetiţa
22	FW	ROU	Andreas Mihaiu
23	FW	ROU	Darius Indrei
24	FW	ROU	Ștefan Blănaru
25	FW	ROU	Denis Golda
26	FW	ROU	Andrei Banyoi
27	FW	ROU	Andrei Pop
28	FW	ROU	Ștefan Glonț

== Club Officials ==
=== Board of directors ===
Role	Name
Owners	(Romania) Alba Iulia Municipality
President	(Romania) Mihai Dăscălescu
Sporting Director	(Romania) Raul Oargă
Delegate	(Romania) Ioan Vlad

=== Current technical staff ===
Role	Name
Manager	(Romania) Cristian Pustai
Assistant Coach	(Romania) Mircea Oprea
Goalkeeping Coach	(Romania) Vasile Șleam

== League history ==
Season	Tier	Division	Place	Notes	Cupa României
2026–27	3	Liga III	TBD		Second round
2025–26	3	Liga III (Series VII)	2nd		Play-off round
2024–25	3	Liga III (Series VII)	2nd		Quarterfinals
2023–24	3	Liga III (Series IX)	5th		
2022–23	3	Liga III (Series IX)	3rd		
2021–22	3	Liga III (Series IX)	9th		First Round
2020–21	3	Liga III (Series IX)	7th		
2019–20	3	Liga III (Seris V)	12th		
2018–19	3	Liga III (Seris IV)	12th		Round of 32
2017–18	3	Liga III (Series V)	6th		
2016–17	3	Liga III (Series IV)	11th		
2015–16	4	Liga IV (AB)	8th		
2012–13	2	Liga II (Seria II)	13th	Relegated	
2011–12	2	Liga II (Seria II)	9th		
2010–11	2	Liga II (Seria II)	11th		
2009–10	1	Liga I	18th	Relegated	Round of 32
2007–08	2	Liga II (Seria II)	4th		
2008–09	2	Liga II (Seria II)	1st (C)	Promoted	

Season	Tier	Division	Place	Notes	Cupa României
2006–07	2	Liga II (Seria II)	4th		Round of 16
2005–06	2	Divizia B (Seria III)	13th		
2004–05	1	Divizia A	14th	Relegated	Round of 32
2003–04	1	Divizia A	6th		Quarter-finals
2002–03	2	Divizia B (Seria II)	1st (C)	Promoted	
2001–02	2	Divizia B (Seria II)	7th		
2000–01	2	Divizia B (Seria II)	9th		
1999–00	2	Divizia B (Seria II)	7th		
1998–99	2	Divizia B (Seria II)	14th		
1997–98	2	Divizia B (Seria II)	14th		Round of 16
1996–97	2	Divizia B (Seria II)	16th		
1995–96	2	Divizia B (Seria II)	15th		
1994–95	2	Divizia B (Seria II)	6th		
1993–94	2	Divizia B (Seria II)	2nd		
1992–93	2	Divizia B (Seria II)	9th		
1991–92	2	Divizia B (Seria II)	7th		Round of 16
1990–91	2	Divizia B (Seria III)	7th		Semi-finals
1989–90	2	Divizia B (Seria II)	3rd		Round of 32

== Former managers ==
- (Romania) Alexandru Moldovan (1991–1992)
- (Romania) Aurel Șunda (2001–2003)
- (Romania) Aurel Șunda (2003)
- (Romania) Alin Artimon (2004–2005)
- (Romania) Alexandru Pelici (2005)
- (Romania) Constantin Cârstea (2006)
- (Romania) Mihai Zamfir (2006–2007)
- (Romania) George Ciorceri (2007)
- (Romania) Aurel Șunda (2007–2009)
- (Romania) Adrian Falub (2009–2010)
- (Bosnia and Herzegovina) Blaž Slišković (2010)
- (Romania) Marius Baciu (2010)
- (Romania) Gabriel Rotaru (2011)
- (Romania) Mihai Dăscălescu (2014–2017)
- (Romania) Valentin Sinescu (2021)
- (Romania) Marcel Rusu (2022–2023)
- (Romania) Stelian Gherman (2023)
- (Romania) Alexandru Pelici (2023–2025)
- (Romania) Dragoș Militaru (2025–2026)
- (Romania) Cristian Pustai (2026–)
- (Romania) Octavian Cojocaru
- (Romania) Ioan Ilie
- (Romania) Gheorghe Borugă
- (Romania) Gheorghe Mulțescu
- (Romania) Octavian Grigore
