= 1 Decembrie 1918 University of Alba Iulia =

Research institution in Romania

Coordinates: 46°04′08″N 23°34′21″E

- Universitatea "1 decembrie 1918" din Alba Iulia
- Other names: UAB
- Established: 1991; 35 years ago
- Academic affiliations: NIBS
- Rector: Valer-Daniel Breaz
- Location: Alba Iulia, Alba County, Romania
- Website: www.uab.ro

University rankings

Regional – Overall
- QS Emerging Europe and Central Asia: 301-350 (2022)

1 Decembrie 1918 University of Alba Iulia is a public higher education and research institution founded in 1991 in Alba Iulia, Romania. It is a state institution, integrated into the national higher education system, which functions based on the Constitution of Romania, the Law of Education, the University Charter, and its own regulations.

== Name origin ==
The name of the university is derived from the date, 1 December 1918, when the Union of Transylvania with Romania was declared, today recognized in Romania as Great Union Day. Its Latin name, Universitas Apulensis, refers to the historical region known as Dacia Apulensis within Roman Dacia, where the university is located.

== Faculties ==
The university has five main faculties, each divided into several departments. They are:

- History and Philology
- Economic Sciences
- Sciences and Engineering
- Law and Social Sciences
- Orthodox Theology

== Archaeology and History department ==
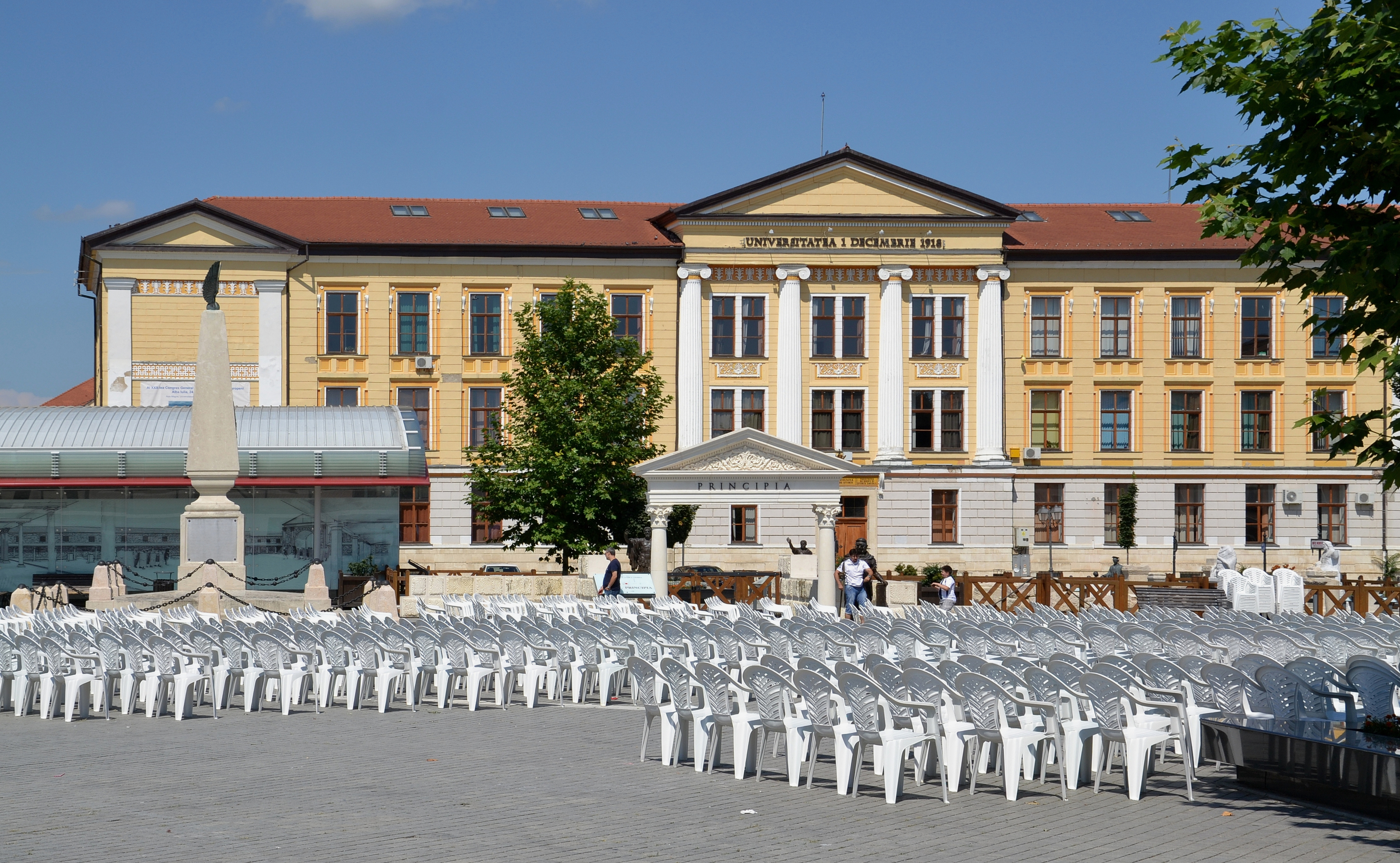
1 December 1918 University, Alba Iulia.

This department functions within the Faculty of History and Philology. The fields of archaeology, history are the main fields that the university was founded on.

At present, there are three majors in this department, Archaeology, History, and Museum Science. Within the department is also the Institute of Systematic Archaeology. Well endowed with experts in the auxiliary sciences of archaeology and modern research laboratories and equipment, it is the only centre of its sort in Romania.

The Archaeology and History department currently administrates and houses the artefact collections from the archaeological excavations at various sites throughout Alba County, notably Tărtăria, Lumea Nouă, and Piatra Tomii. In 2018, The University of Alba Iulia hosted the SATEE 2018 Scientific Conference.

== Education and admission ==
The university organizes studies at bachelor, master, and doctorate program level. All programs are fully accredited by the Ministry of Education in Romania and the Bologna principles. The university had a budget of €1.5 million for the Erasmus+ program.

== Students' representation ==
The Students' Union within UAB is called "Liga Studenților din Universitatea '1 Decembrie 1918' Alba Iulia" (widely known as LSUA) and it is the main representative of the students. Students can become members of the Union by filling in a form and by being approved by the President of LSUA. LSUA's aim is to represent students within UAB and also to offer an alternative to spend students' spare time and conduct different activities, from entertainment to scientific and educational activities.

== Publications ==
The university publishes the Annales Universitatis Apulensis with several series, each specialised in one specific science such as history and economics.

== See also ==
- List of Jesuit sites
