= CS Ocna Mureș =

Romanian football club

- Full name: Clubul Sportiv Ocna Mureș
- Nicknames: Ocna-Mureșenii (The people from Ocna Mureș) Alb-Albaștrii (The white and blues)
- Short name: Ocna Mureș
- Founded: 1933; 93 years ago as Solvay Uioara; 1945; 81 years ago as Soda Ocna Mureș; 2007; 19 years ago as CS Ocna Mureș
- Ground: Soda
- Capacity: 2.000 (1.500 seated)
- Owner: Ocna Mureș Town
- Chairman: Stelian Grozav
- Manager: Romeo Arinar
- League: Liga IV
- 2025–26: Liga IV, Alba County, 4th of 13
Home colours	Away colours

Clubul Sportiv Ocna Mureș commonly known as CS Ocna Mureș or simply Ocna Mureș, is a Romanian football club based in Ocna Mureș, Alba County, which currently competes in the Liga IV Alba County, one of the regional divisions of the fourth tier of Romanian football.

The club was known in the interwar period as Solvay Uioara and as Soda Ocna Mureș between 1945 and 2007.

== History ==
The club was founded in 1933 as Solvay Uioara, from the passion of the Belgian baron Solvay – the owner then of the soda factory – to continue the tradition of football in Ocna Mureș, began by FC Ocna Mureș still before the First World War, when the precursor of the team from the town on the Mureș River represented the town in the rural Hungarian second division in the 1913–14 season.

Solvay Uioara competed in the Northern League Championship, the fourth tier, and was promoted to Divizia C at the end of the 1936–37 season after winning the Aiud District Championship. In the 1937–38 season, the team finished 5th in Series I of the North League of Divizia C. Following the dissolution of Divizia C, Solvay continued at regional level and, after football activity resumed in 1946 following a five-year suspension due to World War II, was promoted to Divizia B, finishing 7th in Series III in the 1946–47 season, 4th in Series IV in the 1947–48 season, and 12th in Series II in the 1948–49 season, returning to the regional championship after a short spell in the second tier.

Following the nationalization started in 1948, the Solvay chemical plants became Uzinele Chimice Ocna Mureș, the club also changing its name to Soda Ocna Mureș, competing in the Cluj Regional Championship and managing to win the 1960–61 season, qualifying for the promotion play-off to the second division, but finishing 3rd behind Rapid Târgu Mureș and Crișul Oradea, missing promotion in the final round after a 1–2 defeat to Metrom Brașov in the tournament held at Sinaia. Soda returned to national-level competitions at the end of the 1962–63 season, finishing as runners-up, one point behind Gloria Bistrița and tied with AS Aiud, thus earning promotion to the newly re-established Divizia C on goal difference.

Name	Period
Solvay Uioara	1933–1949
Soda Ocna Mureș	1949–2007
CS Ocna Mureș	2007–present

== Honours ==
Liga III

- Runners-up (3): 1963–64, 1965–66, 2005–06

Liga IV – Alba County

- Winners (7): 1979–80, 1981–82, 1988–89, 1997–98, 1999–2000, 2017–18, 2019–20
- Runners-up (2): 2008–09, 2016–17

Cluj Regional Championship

- Winners (1): 1960–61
- Runners-up (1): 1962–63

== Ground ==
The stadium from Ocna Mureș was inaugurated on 30 August 1936 with the occasion of the match between Solvay Uioara and IAR Brașov (2–4), and was the first stadium with a lighting system in Romania. With the ultra-modern floodlights of those days, and the good training conditions, they made that the Romanian national team to establish its training camp in the town on the Mureș River.

Stadionul Soda, known as Dragostei (Love) Stadium, holds 2000 seats, where 500 of them are covered. The field size is 105x65 with natural grass. There exists a circuit for athletics. In 2015, the stadium was renovated.

== Notable former players ==
- Bazil Marian
- Iosif Lengheriu
- Ioachim Moldoveanu
- Cornel Cacoveanu
- Ion Voinescu
- Alexandru Moldovan
- Sebastian Culda
- Sorin Corpodean
- Ovidiu Maier
- Mircea Stanciu
- Tiberiu Bălan
- Gicu Domșa
- Dan Roman
