= Leontin Doană =

Romanian footballer and manager

Personal information
- Date of birth: 17 January 1970 (age 56)
- Place of birth: Reșița, Romania
- Height: 1.78 m (5 ft 10 in)
- Position: Midfielder

Team information
- Current team: CSM Caransebeș (head coach)

Youth career
- –1987: CSM Reșița

Senior career*
Years	Team	Apps	(Gls)
1987–2002	CSM Reșița	231	(31)
1994	→ Metalul Bocșa (loan)	16	(4)
2003	CS Certej		
2003–2004	CS Deva	25	(2)
2004–2005	Gloria Reșița		
2005–2009	FCM Reșița	85	(10)
2009–2010	Prolaz Karaševo		
2011–2014	FCM Reșița		
2014–2015	Semenicul Văliug		
2015–2016	CSMȘ Reșița		
Total		357	(47)

Managerial career
- 2009–2010: Prolaz Karaševo (player/coach)
- 2011–2012: FCM Reșița (player/coach)
- 2013–2014: FCM Reșița (player/coach)
- 2014–2015: Semenicul Văliug (player/coach)
- 2015–2016: CSMȘ Reșița U19
- 2016–2017: CSMȘ Reșița
- 2018–2019: CSMȘ Reșița
- 2019–2026: CSM Reșița U19
- 2026: CSM Reșița
- 2026–: CSM Caransebeș
- * Club domestic league appearances and goals

Leontin "Leo" Doană (born 17 January 1970) is a Romanian former professional footballer and former player, currently head coach of Liga IV club CSM Caransebeș.

== Personal life ==
His son, Ianis, is also a footballer, currently playing for Liga II club Politehnica Timișoara.

== Honours ==
=== Player ===
CSM Reșița

- Divizia B: 1991–92, 1996–97
- Liga IV – Caraș-Severin County: 2015–16

=== Coach ===
CSM Reșița

- Liga III: 2018–19
- Liga IV – Caraș-Severin County: 2015–16
