= List of FC Steaua București records and statistics =

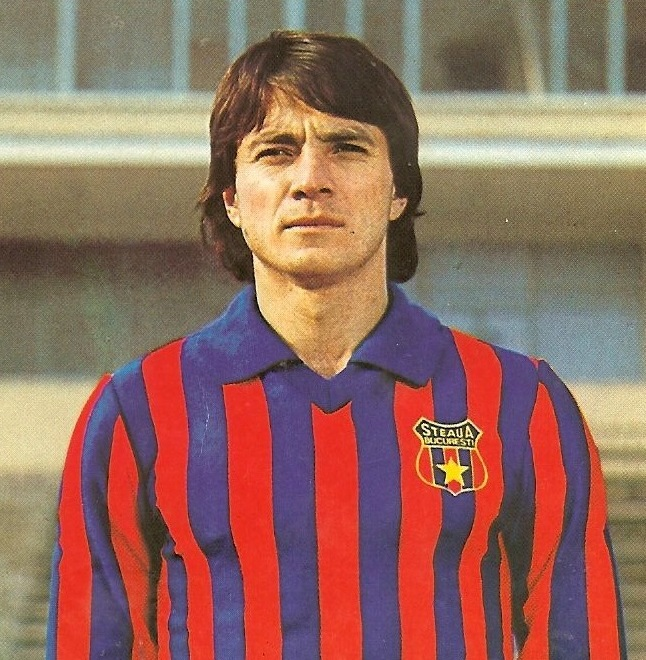
Tudorel Stoica made 370 total appearances for Steaua, a club record.

The FC Steaua București football club has played 79 seasons in Liga I, which it has won 28 times. It has also won Cupa României 23 times, Supercupa României 8 times and Cupa Ligii 2 times – all competition records. In UEFA competitions the club has won the European Cup on 7 May 1986 and European Super Cup on 24 February 1987. It has also reached the European Cup final in 1989, the final of the Intercontinental Cup in 1986, quarter-finals of the European Cup Winners' Cup in 1972 and 1993, and the semi-finals of the UEFA Cup in 2006. Its players have won numerous awards and many of them have represented Romania in international competitions.

== Overall seasons table in Liga I ==
Including 2024–25 season

Pos	Club	Season In Liga I	P	W	D	L	GF	GA	GD	Champion	2nd place	3rd place	4th place	5th place	6th place	9th place	12th place	14th place
1	FC Steaua București	77	2392	1334	556	502	4485	2395	1920	28	19	9	4	6	6	2	1	1

== Steaua in European and International competitions ==
Including 2026–27 season

Competition	S	Pld	W	D	L	GF	GA	GD
UEFA Champions League / European Cup	30	154	56	42	56	224	216	+8
UEFA Super Cup / European Super Cup	1	1	1	0	0	1	0	+1
UEFA Europa League / UEFA Cup	23	170	71	44	56	237	210	+27
UEFA Europa Conference League	4	20	7	3	10	22	37	–15
UEFA Cup Winners' Cup / European Cup Winners' Cup	11	40	14	12	14	51	54	−3
Intercontinental Cup	1	1	0	0	1	0	1	−1
Total	70	386	149	101	136	534	516	+18

== Honours ==
Steaua won their first trophy in 1948 when they lifted the Cupa Romaniei. The club won the Romanian Championship a record 14 times during the 40-year span of the tournament.

They are the most successful football club in Romanian, having won a total of 61 domestic titles: 28 Liga 1, a record 23 Cupa Romaniei, a record 8 Supercupa Romaniei, a record 2 Cupa Ligii

The club is also one of the most successful clubs in international club football, having won 2 official trophies in total, 1 of which are UEFA competitions . Steaua has won one UEFA Champions League title and one UEFA Super Cup title.

=== Domestic ===
==== Leagues ====
- Liga I / Divizia A / Superliga
  - Winners (28) – Record: 1951, 1952, 1953, 1956, 1959–60, 1960–61, 1967–68, 1975–76, 1977–78, 1984–85, 1985–86, 1986–87, 1987–88, 1988–89, 1992–93, 1993–94, 1994–95, 1995–96, 1996–97, 1997–98, 2000–01, 2004–05, 2005–06, 2012–13, 2013–14, 2014–15, 2000–01, 2004–05, 2005–06, 2012–13, 2013–14, 2014–15, 2023–24, 2024–25

  - Runners-up (20): 1954, 1957–58, 1962–63, 1976–77, 1979–80, 1983–84, 1989–90, 1990–91, 1991–92, 2002–03, 2003–04, 2006–07, 2007–08, 2015–16, 2016–17, 2017–18, 2018–19, 2020–21, 2021–22, 2022–23

==== Cups ====
- Cupa României
  - Winners (24) – Record: 1948–49, 1950, 1951, 1952, 1955, 1961–62, 1965–66, 1966–67, 1968–69, 1969–70, 1970–71, 1975–76, 1978–79, 1984–85, 1986–87, 1987–88 (!?), 1988–89, 1991–92, 1995–96, 1996–97, 1998–99, 2010–11, 2014–15, 2019–20
  - Runners-up (8): 1953, 1963–64, 1976–77, 1979–80, 1983–84, 1985–86, 1989–90, 2013–14
- Cupa Ligii
  - Winners (2) – Record: 2014–15, 2015–16
- Supercupa României
  - Winners (8) – Record: 1994, 1995, 1998, 2001, 2006, 2013, 2024, 2025
  - Runners-up (6): 1999, 2005, 2011, 2014, 2015, 2020

=== European ===
European Cup / UEFA Champions League:

- Winners (1): 1985–86
- Runners-up (1): 1988–89
- Semi-finalists (1): 1987–88

European Super Cup / UEFA Super Cup:

- Winners (1): 1986

UEFA Cup / UEFA Europa League:

- Semi-finalists (1): 2005–06

European Cup Winners' Cup / UEFA Cup Winners' Cup:

- Quarter-finalists (2): 1971–72, 1992–93

=== International ===
Intercontinental Cup:

- Runners-up (1): 1986

=== Minor honours ===
- The Autumn Cup:
  - Winners (1): 1949
- Dordrecht Tournament (Dordrecht-Holland):
  - Winners (1): 1984
- Bruges Matins: Link
  - Winners (1): 1987
  - Third Place (1): 1988
- Norcia Winter Cup: Link
  - Winners (1): 1999
  - Runners-up (1): 2001
  - Third Place (1): 2000
- Torneo di Viareggio: Link
  - Third Place (1): 1973
- Trofeo Ciudad de La Línea (Cádiz-Spain): Link
  - Runners-up (1): 1975
- Joan Gamper Trophy (Barcelona-Spain): Link
  - Runners-up (1): 1988
- Teresa Herrera Trophy (La Coruña-Spain): Link
  - Runners-up (1): 1989
- Villa de Gijón Trophy: Link
  - Third Place (1): 1984
- Santiago Bernabéu Trophy: Link
  - Third Place (1): 1986
- Carlsberg Cup: Link
  - Third Place (1): 1992
- Ibrox International Challenge Trophy: Link
  - Third Place (1): 1995

== Player Honours ==
=== Awards ===
Gazeta Sporturilor Awards
Honour	Player	Year
Romanian Footballer of the Year ^{(from 1966)}	Ion Dumitru	1973
Romanian Footballer of the Year ^{(from 1966)}	Ion Dumitru	1975
Romanian Footballer of the Year ^{(from 1966)}	Ștefan Sameș	1979
Romanian Footballer of the Year ^{(from 1966)}	Marcel Răducanu	1980
Romanian Footballer of the Year ^{(from 1966)}	Helmut Duckadam	1986
Romanian Footballer of the Year ^{(from 1966)}	Gheorghe Hagi	1987
Romanian Footballer of the Year ^{(from 1966)}	Nicolae Dică	2006
Romanian Footballer of the Year ^{(from 1966)}	Raul Rusescu	2012
Romanian Footballer of the Year ^{(from 1966)}	Vlad Chiricheș	2013
Romanian Footballer of the Year ^{(from 1966)}	Lucian Sânmărtean	2014
Romanian Footballer of the Year ^{(from 1966)}	Dennis Man	2020
Liga I Foreign Footballer of the Year ^{(from 2008)}	Łukasz Szukała	2014
Liga I Foreign Footballer of the Year ^{(from 2008)}	Fernando Varela	2015
Liga I Foreign Footballer of the Year ^{(from 2008)}	Fernando Boldrin	2016
Liga I Foreign Footballer of the Year ^{(from 2008)}	Harlem Gnohéré	2017
Liga I Foreign Footballer of the Year ^{(from 2008)}	Harlem Gnohéré	2018
Liga I Foreign Footballer of the Year ^{(from 2008)}	Andrea Compagno	2022
Liga I Foreign Footballer of the Year ^{(from 2008)}	Risto Radunovic	2024
Best Scorer ^{(from 2010)}	Bogdan Stancu	2010
Best Goalkeeper ^{(from 2010)}	Ciprian Tătărușanu	2010

Lithuanian Awards
Honour	Player	Season
Lithuanian Footballer of the Year	Giedrius Arlauskis	2014

Top Gazeta Sporturilor Awards ^{(2007–2011)}
Honour	Player	Season
Best Goalkeeper	Róbinson Zapata	2007–08 T
Best Goalkeeper	Róbinson Zapata	2007–08 R
Best Goalkeeper	Róbinson Zapata	2009–10 T
Best Central Defender	Ionuț Rada	2007–08 T
Best Central Defender	Dorin Goian	2007–08 R
Best Central Defender	Mirel Rădoi	2007–08 R
Best Right Defender	Paweł Golański	2007–08 R
Best Right Midfielder	Bănel Nicoliță	2008–09 T
Best Right Midfielder	János Székely	2009–10 T
Best Left Midfielder	Arman Karamyan	2009–10 R
Best Forward	Pantelis Kapetanos	2009–10 T
Best Forward	Bogdan Stancu	2010–11 T

LPF Awards ^{(from 2010)}
Honour	Player	Year
Best Forward	Bogdan Stancu	2010
Best Rookie	Florin Gardoș	2010

ProSport Awards
Honour	Player	Year
Foreign Footballer of the Year	Pantelis Kapetanos	2009
Liga I Romanian Footballer of the Year	Bogdan Stancu	2010

Fanatik Awards
Honour	Player	Year
Footballer of the Year	Dorin Goian	2008
Footballer of the Year	Lucian Sânmărtean	2014
Liga I Footballer of the Year	Darius Olaru	2024
Special Prize	Bănel Nicoliță	2008
Special Prize	Adrian Șut	2024
Best Forward	Bogdan Stancu	2010
Best Forward	Daniel Bîrligea	2024
Explosion of the Year	Cristian Tănase	2011
Man of the Year	Novak Martinović	2011
Fantastic of the Year	Alexandru Chipciu	2012
Defender of the Year	Vlad Chiricheș	2012
Defender of the Year	Łukasz Szukała	2014
Defender of the Year	Siyabonga Ngezana	2024
Midfielder of the Year	Alexandru Bourceanu	2012
Midfielder of the Year	Mihai Pintilii	2014
Forward of the Year	Raul Rusescu	2012
Forward of the Year	Claudiu Keșerü	2014
Prize of Excellency	Raul Rusescu	2014
Transfer of the Year	Paul Papp	2014
Foreign Footballer of the Year	Fernando Varela	2014
Foreign Footballer of the Year	Risto Radunovic	2024
Goalkeeper of the Year	Giedrius Arlauskis	2014
Goalkeeper of the Year	Ștefan Târnovanu	2024

AISS Awards
Honour	Player	Season
Steaua Footballer of the Season	Róbinson Zapata	2007–08

sport.ro Awards
Honour	Player	Year
Footballer of the Year	Bănel Nicoliță	2009
Foreign Footballer of the Year	Pantelis Kapetanos	2009

stelisti.ro Awards
Honour	Player	Year
Steaua Footballer of the Year	Pantelis Kapetanos	2009

romaniansoccer.ro Awards
Honour	Player	Season
Footballer of the Year	Dorin Goian	2007–08
Foreign Footballer of the Year	Róbinson Zapata	2007–08

Sport Total FM Awards
Honour	Player	Season
Foreign Footballer of the Year	Róbinson Zapata	2007–08
Foreign Footballer of the Year	Pantelis Kapetanos	2008–09

Radio România Actualități Awards
Honour	Player	Season
Revelation of the Season	Róbinson Zapata	2007–08

AFR and CSJ Awards
Honour	Player	Year
Foreign Footballer of the Year	Róbinson Zapata	2009
Goalkeeper of the Year	Ciprian Tătărușanu	2011

UEFA Awards
Honour	Player	Season
Best Player in Team of the group stage	Alexandru Bourceanu	2012–13

AFR and Fanatik Awards
Honour	Player	Year
Best Goalkeeper	Ciprian Tătărușanu	2013
Best Defender	Florin Gardoș	2013
Best Romanian Player	Alexandru Bourceanu	2013

AFAN Awards
Honour	Player	Year
Younger of the Year	Nicolae Stanciu	2013
Goalkeeper of the Year	Ciprian Tătărușanu	2013
Goalkeeper of the Year	Giedrius Arlauskis	2014
Defender of the Year	Florin Gardoș	2013
Defender of the Year	Vlad Chiricheș	2013
Defender of the Year	Łukasz Szukała	2014
Midfielder of the Year	Alexandru Bourceanu	2013
Midfielder of the Year	Lucian Sânmărtean	2014
Forward of the Year	Claudiu Keșerü	2014
Footballer of the Year	Alexandru Bourceanu	2013
Footballer of the Year	Lucian Sânmărtean	2014
Foreign Footballer of the Year	Łukasz Szukała	2014

=== Top scorer ===
Balkan Cup Top Goalscorer
Player	Season	Goals
Anghel Iordănescu	1977–80	6
UEFA Champions League Top Goalscorer
Player	Season	Goals
Gheorghe Hagi	1987–88	4 *
European Bronze Boot
Player	Season	Goals
Victor Pițurcă	1987–88	34
Liga I Top Scorers
Player	Season	Goals
Ion Alecsandrescu	1956	18
Gheorghe Constantin	1959–60	20
Gheorghe Constantin	1960–61	22
Gheorghe Constantin	1961–62	24
Cornel Pavlovici	1963–64	19 *
Gheorghe Tătaru	1970–71	15 *
Anghel Iordănescu	1981–82	20
Victor Pițurcă	1987–88	34
Gavril Balint	1989–90	19
Ilie Dumitrescu	1992–93	24
Ion Vlădoiu	1995–96	25
Sabin Ilie	1996–97	31
Claudiu Răducanu	2002–03	21
Raul Rusescu	2012–13	21
(France) Harlem Gnohéré	2017–18	15 *
Florin Tănase	2020–21	24
Florin Tănase	2021–22	20
Florinel Coman	2023–24	18 *

(*) Title shared.

=== Other awards ===
Gazeta Sporturilor Awards
Honour	Coach	Year
Romania Coach of the Year ^{(from 2004)}	Oleg Protasov	2005
Romania Coach of the Year ^{(from 2004)}	Cosmin Olăroiu	2006
Romania Coach of the Year ^{(from 2004)}	Laurențiu Reghecampf	2013

AFR and Fanatik Awards
Honour	Coach	Year
Romania Coach of the Year	Laurențiu Reghecampf	2013

Fanatik Awards
Honour	Coach	Year
Romania Coach of the Year	Laurențiu Reghecampf	2014

AFAN Awards
Honour	Coach	Year
Romania Coach of the Year	Laurențiu Reghecampf	2013
Romania Coach of the Year	Constantin Gâlcă	2014

FIFA 100
Gheorghe Hagi

== Team records ==
=== Highest transfer fees received ===
	Player	To	Fee	Year
1	(Romania) Dennis Man	(Italy) Parma	€13.0m	2021
2	(Romania) Nicolae Stanciu	(Belgium) Anderlecht	€9.70m	2016
3	(Romania) Vlad Chiricheș	(England) Tottenham Hotspur	€9.50m	2013
4	(Romania) Florin Gardoș	(England) Southampton	€6.80m	2014
5	(Romania) Mirel Rădoi	(Saudi Arabia) Al-Hilal	€6.00m	2009
6	(Romania) Florinel Coman	(Qatar) Al-Gharafa	€5.25m	2024
7	(Romania) Bogdan Stancu	(Turkey) Galatasaray	€5.00m	2011
8	(Romania) Gheorghe Hagi	(Spain) Real Madrid	€4.30m	1990
9	(Romania) Olimpiu Moruțan	(Turkey) Galatasaray	€4.20m	2021
10	(Romania) Ilie Dumitrescu	(England) Tottenham Hotspur	€3.70m	1994
11	(Romania) Cătălin Munteanu	(Spain) Salamanca	€3.60m	1998
12-14	(Romania) Florin Tanase	(Saudi Arabia) Al-Jazira	€3.00m	2022
12-14	(Romania) George Ogăraru	(Netherlands) Ajax	€3.00m	2006
12-14	(Romania) Alexandru Chipciu	(Belgium) Anderlecht	€3.00m	2016
15	(France) Cyril Théréau	(Belgium) Anderlecht	€2.90m	2007
16-17	(Romania) Nicolae Dică	(Italy) Catania	€2.50m	2008
16-17	(Romania) Constantin Budescu	(Saudi Arabia) Al-Shabab	€2.50m	2018
18-20	(Romania) Mihai Pintilii	(Saudi Arabia) Al-Hilal	€2.40m	2014
18-20	(Romania) Claudiu Keșerü	(Qatar) Al-Gharafa	€2.40m	2015
18-20	(Romania) Adrian Ilie	(Turkey) Galatasaray	€2.40m	1996

=== Records ===
Matches
Record name	Date	Competition	Opponent	Result
Win	10 June 1964	Cupa României	CIL Blaj	12–0
League Win	7 December 1988	Divizia A	Corvinul Hunedoara	11–0
League Win Home	7 December 1988	Divizia A	Corvinul Hunedoara	11–0
League Win Away	10 April 1955	Divizia A	Avântul Reghin	9–1
League Win Away	6 May 1956	Divizia A	Dinamo Bacău	8–0
Cup Win	10 June 1964	Cupa României	CIL Blaj	12–0
Cup Win Away	27 June 1951	Cupa României	Locomotiva Galați	9–0
Super Cup Win	9 September 1998	Supercupa României	Rapid București	4–0
European Win	3 October 1979	UEFA Cup Winners' Cup	Young Boys	6–0
European Win	18 September 2014	UEFA Europa League	AaB	6–0
European Win Home	3 October 1979	UEFA Cup Winners' Cup	Young Boys	6–0
European Win Home	18 September 2014	UEFA Europa League	AaB	6–0
European Win Away	7 September 1988	European Cup	Sparta Prague	5–1
Loss	14 September 1947	Divizia A	ITA Arad	0–7
League Loss	14 September 1947	Divizia A	ITA Arad	0–7
League Loss Home	7 March 1948	Divizia A	ITA Arad	1–6
League Loss Away	14 September 1947	Divizia A	ITA Arad	0–7
Super Cup Loss	7 October 1999	Supercupa României	Rapid București	0–5
European Loss	23 October 1990	UEFA Cup Winners' Cup	Montpellier	0–5
European Loss	27 August 1997	UEFA Champions League	Paris Saint-Germain	0–5
European Loss	20 October 2011	UEFA Europa League	Maccabi Haifa	0–5
European Loss	6 October 2022	UEFA Europa Conference League	Silkeborg	0–5
European Loss	13 October 2022	UEFA Europa Conference League	Silkeborg	0–5
European Loss Home	13 October 2022	UEFA Europa Conference League	Silkeborg	0–5
European Loss Home	22 November 2012	UEFA Europa League	Stuttgart	1–5
European Loss Home	1 October 2013	UEFA Champions League	Chelsea	0–4
European Loss Away	23 October 1990	UEFA Cup Winners' Cup	Montpellier	0–5
European Loss Away	27 August 1997	UEFA Champions League	Paris Saint-Germain	0–5
European Loss Away	20 October 2011	UEFA Europa League	Maccabi Haifa	0–5
European Loss Away	6 October 2022	UEFA Europa Conference League	Silkeborg	0–5

=== Others ===
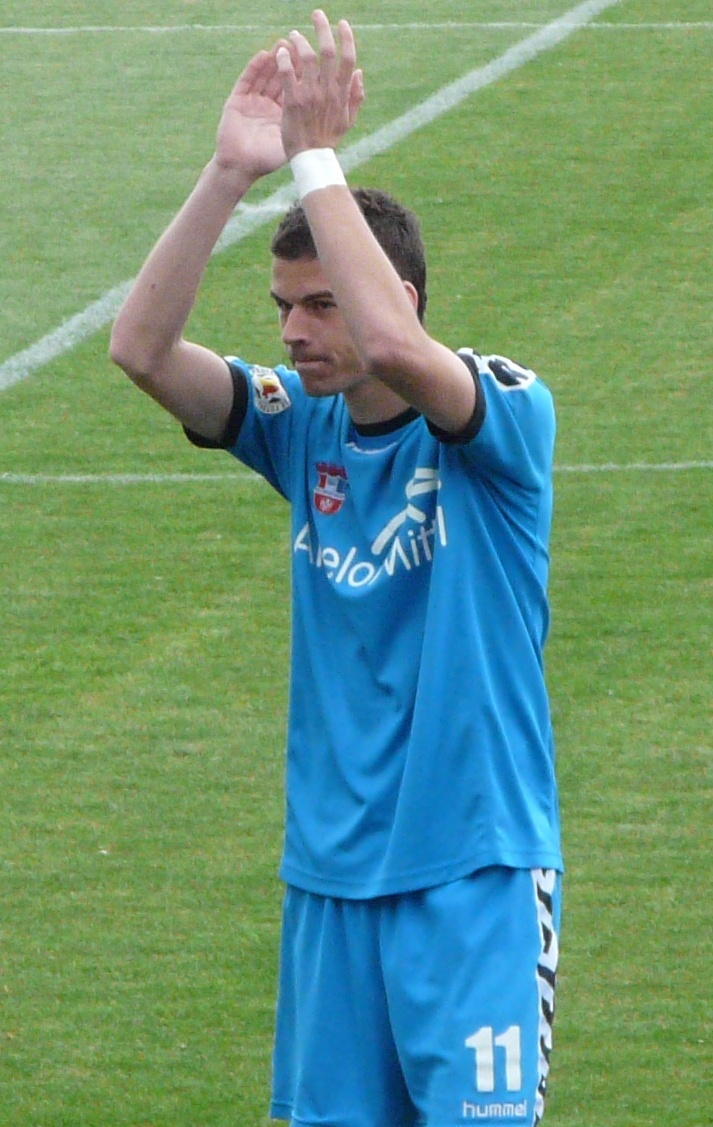
Ochiroșii, youngest goal scorer in European cups.

- Record League Percentage in a Season: 65 pts in 34 matches (1988–89; 2 pts/win; 95.59%);
- Most Goals Scored in a Season: 121 (1988–89; 3,55/match);
- Fewest Goals Conceded in a Season: 16 (2005–06; 0,53/match);
- Most Appearances: Tudorel Stoica (369 matches in 14 seasons);
- Most Goals Scored: Anghel Iordănescu (155 goals in 14 seasons);
- Negative Record: 13 matches without victory in LI, UCL, CR, (from 26 September 2008 to 22 November 2008)
- Youngest goal scorer in European cups: Răzvan Ochiroșii: 17 years, 4 months and 20 days (2 August 2006 v ND Gorica);

=== National ===
- Record Unbeaten League Run: 104 matches (June 1986 – September 1989) World record;
- Record Home Unbeaten League Run: 112 matches (November 1989 – August 1996);
- Record League Percentage in a Season: 65 pts in 34 matches (1988–89; 2 pts/win; 95,58%);
- Most Goals Scored in a Season: 121 (1988–89; 3,55/match);
- Most seasons in UEFA Champions League group stage for a Romanian Team - 7 (1994–95, 1995–96, 1996–97, 2006–07, 2007–08, 2008–2009, 2013–2014);
- The only Romanian club to have made it in the European spring for three seasons in a row (2004–05, 2005–06, 2006–07);
- Most trophies in Romanian football: 62;
- Most National Championships: 28;
- Most National Cups: 24;
- Most National Supercups: 8;
- Most championships in a row: 6 (1992-93 – 1997-98, equal to Chinezul Timișoara's record from the 1920s);
- Most matches won in a row in Divizia A: 17 (equal to Dinamo București);
- Steaua (78 seasons) are the only club to have played only in the first Romanian league;
- For 17 years, no other team from Romania has managed to advance any further than Steaua in European club competitions (not counting the two seasons when Steaua didn't manage to qualify for Europe);
- Most national championships won by a single player: Marius Lăcătuș (10);

=== International ===
- Record Unbeaten League Run: 104 matches (June 1986 – September 1989) World Record;
- The first Eastern European team and the only team from a communist country to win the European Cup;
- Best penalty shootout performance inside European competitions: Helmut Duckadam, saving all four penalties in the ECC Final in 1986.

=== UEFA club coefficient ranking ===
These are the International Federation of Football History & Statistics (IFFHS) club's points as of 31 October 2022:

P	Club	Points
129	(Colombia) Atlético Nacional	113,50
130	(Sweden) Djurgården	113,00
131	(Colombia) Deportivo Cali	112,50
131	(Romania) FCSB	112,50
133	(Brazil) Red Bull Bragantino	112,00
133	(Morocco) Raja Casablanca	112,00

This is the UEFA club's coefficient as of 7 November 2022:

P	Club	Coefficient
129	(Lithuania) Žalgiris	11,000
129	(Finland) HJK Helsinki	11,000
129	(Romania) FCSB	11,000
129	(Poland) Legia Warsaw	11,000
129	(Norway) Rosenborg	11,000
129	(Greece) AEK Athens	11,000

== Managerial records ==
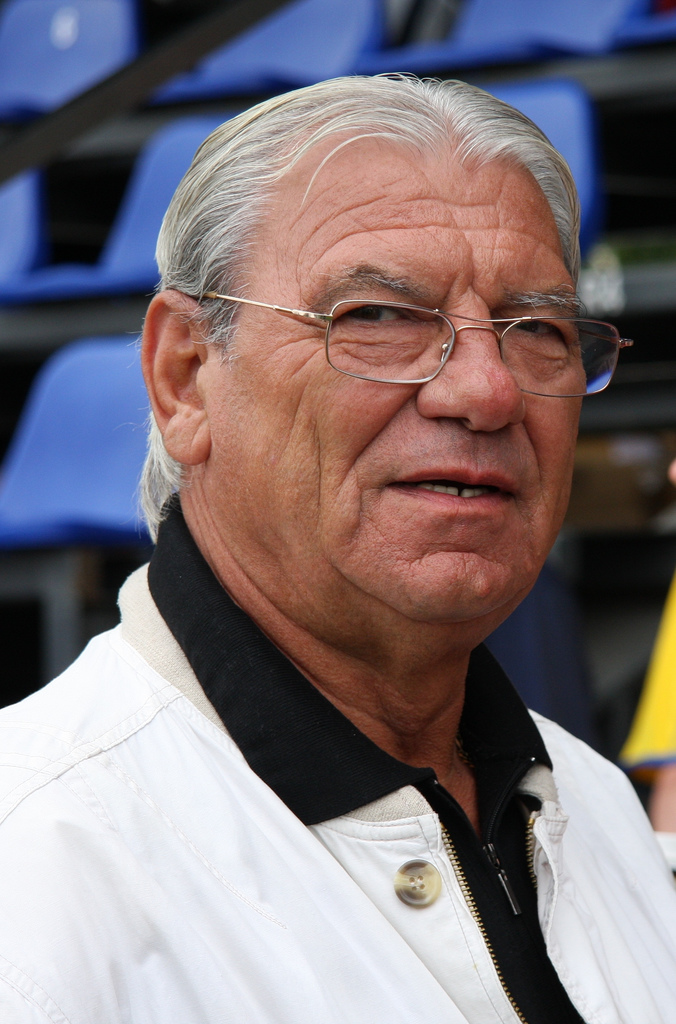
Emerich Jenei won the club nine domestic honours and the 1985–86 European Cup.

- First full-time manager: Coloman Braun-Bogdan.
- Most seasons as coach: Emerich Jenei
- Most consecutive seasons as coach: Dumitriu Dumitriu
- Most matches undefeated in a Divizia A season: Emerich Jenei
- Most consecutive matches undefeated in a La Liga season: Emerich Jenei
- Most consecutive away matches undefeated in a La Liga season: Emerich Jenei
- Most consecutive away matches won in La Liga: Emerich Jenei
- Most trophies won as coach: Emerich Jenei
- Coaches who won the treble:
  - Dumitriu Dumitriu in 1995-96.
  - Costel Galca in 2014–15.

== Players records ==
=== Liga I appearances (top 10) ===
As of 31 August 2006. Appearances adds from official book (p. 374–385).

	Player	Years	Apps
1	Tudorel Stoica	1975–1989; 1990–1991	366
2	Marius Lăcătuș	1983–1990; 1993–2000	357
3	Anghel Iordănescu	1968–1982; 1986	316
4	Iosif Vigu	1966–1973; 1974–1979	313
5	Ștefan Iovan	1981–1991; 1992	291
6	Ștefan Sameș	1973–1983	274
7	Lajos Sătmăreanu	1964–1975	271
8	Gheorghe Constantin	1955–1969	264
9	Teodor Anghelini	1974–1984	263
10	Mirel Rădoi	2000–2009	248

=== Liga I top scorers (top 10) ===
As of 31 August 2025

	Player	Years	Goals
1	Anghel Iordănescu	1968–1982; 1986	155
2	Gheorghe Constantin	1955–1969	148
3	Victor Pițurcă	1983–1989	137
4	Florea Voinea	1961–1970; 1972–1973	106
5	Marius Lăcătuș	1983–1990; 1993–2000	98
6	Marcel Răducanu	1972–1981	94
7	Florin Tănase	2016–2022; 2024–Present	85
8	Ion Alecsandrescu	1950–1951; 1953–1962	80
9	Viorel Năstase	1971–1979	77
10	Gheorghe Hagi	1987–1990	76

=== Liga I full season appearances ===
	Player	Season	Apps
1	Ștefan Onisie	1948–1949	26 of 26
2	Alexandru Apolzan	1950	22 of 22
3	Ștefan Balint	1950	22 of 22
4	Traian Ionescu	1950	22 of 22
5	Alexandru Apolzan	1951	22 of 22
6	Ștefan Balint	1951	22 of 22
7	Petre Bădeanțu	1951	22 of 22
8	Tiberiu Bone	1951	22 of 22
9	Ion Voinescu	1951	22 of 22
10	Vasile Zavoda	1951	22 of 22
11	Alexandru Apolzan	1952	22 of 22
12	Tiberiu Bone	1952	22 of 22
13	Tiberiu Bone	1953	21 of 21
14	Victor Dumitrescu	1954	26 of 26
15	Nicolae Tătaru	1955	24 of 24
16	Vasile Zavoda	1955	24 of 24
17	Gabriel Raksi	1960–1961	26 of 26
18	Nicolae Tătaru	1960–1961	26 of 26
19	Gheorghe Constantin	1961–1962	26 of 26
20	Emerich Jenei	1961–1962	26 of 26

	Player	Season	Apps
21	Ion Voinescu	1961–1962	26 of 26
22	Emerich Jenei	1962–1963	27 of 27
23	Gheorghe Constantin	1962–1963	27 of 27
24	Carol Creiniceanu	1964–1965	26 of 26
25	Mircea Georgescu	1964–1965	26 of 26
26	Mircea Petescu	1965–1966	26 of 26
27	Emerich Jenei	1966–1967	26 of 26
28	Lajos Sătmăreanu	1966–1967	26 of 26
29	Sorin Avram	1967–1968	26 of 26
30	Vasile Negrea	1967–1968	26 of 26
31	Lajos Sătmăreanu	1967–1968	26 of 26
32	Iosif Vigu	1968–1969	30 of 30
33	Marius Ciugarin	1970–1971	30 of 30
34	Nicolae Pantea	1970–1971	30 of 30
35	Iosif Vigu	1970–1971	30 of 30
36	Teodor Anghelini	1974–1975	34 of 34
37	Iosif Vigu	1974–1975	34 of 34
38	Iosif Vigu	1975–1976	34 of 34
39	Marcel Răducanu	1978–1979	34 of 34
40	Ion Dumitru	1979–1980	34 of 34

	Player	Season	Apps
41	Victor Pițurcă	1985–1986	34 of 34
42	Anton Doboș	1993–1994	34 of 34
43	Florentin Dumitru	2001–2002	30 of 30
44	Ciprian Tătărușanu	2010–2011	34 of 34
45	Raul Rusescu	2012–2013	34 of 34

=== Brothers who played for Steaua ===
Name
Daniel & Romario Benzar
Mihai & Florin Costea
Artyom & Arman Karamyan
Adrian & Sabin Ilie
Daniel & Iulian Minea
Dumitru & Constantin Dumitriu
Nicolae & Gheorghe Tătaru
Francisc & Vasile Zavoda

=== Team top scorers ===
League topscorer

Season	Winner	Goals
1947–1948	Gheorghe Popescu I	10
1948–1949	Petre Moldoveanu	10
1950	Nicolae Drăgan; Petre Moldoveanu	7
1951	Nicolae Drăgan; Petre Moldoveanu; Petre Bădeanțu	9
1952	Victor Moldovan	10
1953	Victor Moldovan	7
1954	Iosif Petschovsky	7
1955	Nicolae Tătaru	16
1956	Ion Alecsandrescu	18
1957–1958	Ion Alecsandrescu	15
1958–1959	Ion Alecsandrescu	13
1959–1960	Gheorghe Constantin	20
1960–1961	Gheorghe Constantin	22
1961–1962	Gheorghe Constantin	24
1962–1963	Florea Voinea	14
1963–1964	Cornel Pavlovici	19
1964–1965	Carol Creiniceanu	9
1965–1966	Cornel Pavlovici	11
1966–1967	Florea Voinea	16
1967–1968	Florea Voinea	13

Season	Winner	Goals
1968–1969	Florea Voinea	17
1969–1970	Gheorghe Tătaru	16
1970–1971	Gheorghe Tătaru	15
1971–1972	Gheorghe Tătaru	6
1972–1973	Viorel Năstase	9
1973–1974	Viorel Năstase	19
1974–1975	Anghel Iordănescu	19
1975–1976	Anghel Iordănescu	23
1976–1977	Viorel Năstase	17
1977–1978	Anghel Iordănescu	19
1978–1979	Marcel Răducanu	13
1979–1980	Marcel Răducanu	23
1980–1981	Marcel Răducanu	7
1981–1982	Anghel Iordănescu	20
1982–1983	Septimiu Câmpeanu	12
1983–1984	Marius Lăcătuș	13
1984–1985	Victor Pițurcă	19
1985–1986	Victor Pițurcă	29
1986–1987	Victor Pițurcă	22
1987–1988	Victor Pițurcă	34
1988–1989	Gheorghe Hagi	31
1989–1990	Gavril Balint	19

Season	Winner	Goals
1990–1991	Dan Petrescu	13
1991–1992	Ilie Stan	12
1992–1993	Ilie Dumitrescu	24
1993–1994	Ilie Dumitrescu	17
1994–1995	Adrian Ilie	11
1995–1996	Ion Vlădoiu	26
1996–1997	Sabin Ilie	31
1997–1998	Cătălin Munteanu	17
1998–1999	Ionel Dănciulescu	15
1999–2000	Ionel Dănciulescu	14
2000–2001	Claudiu Răducanu	12
2001–2002	Claudiu Răducanu	14
2002–2003	Claudiu Răducanu	21
2003–2004	Adrian Neaga	13
2004–2005	Nicolae Dică	11
2005–2006	Nicolae Dică	15
2006–2007	Valentin Badea	13
2007–2008	Nicolae Dică	9
2008–2009	(Greece) Pantelis Kapetanos; Bogdan Stancu	11
2009–2010	(Greece) Pantelis Kapetanos	15
2010–2011	Bogdan Stancu	13

Season	Winner	Goals
2011–2012	Raul Rusescu	13
2012–2013	Raul Rusescu	21
2013–2014	(Italy) Federico Piovaccari	10
2014–2015	Claudiu Keșerü	12
2015–2016	Nicolae Stanciu	12
2016–2017	Fernando Boldrin; Denis Alibec	8
2017–2018	(France) Harlem Gnohéré	15
2018–2019	(France) Harlem Gnohéré	15
2019–2020	Florinel Coman	12
2020–2021	Florin Tănase	24
2021–2022	Florin Tănase	20
2022–2023	(Italy) Andrea Compagno	15
2023–2024	Florinel Coman	19
2024–2025	Daniel Bîrligea	17

=== Steaua players at the final tournaments ===
==== 1952 Summer Olympics ====
Romania — Iosif Petschovsky
Romania — Ion Voinescu
Romania — Vasile Zavoda

==== 1964 Summer Olympics ====
Romania — Bujor Hălmăgeanu
Romania — Emerich Jenei
Romania — Sorin Avram
Romania — Gheorghe Constantin
Romania — Constantin Koszka
Romania — Carol Creiniceanu
Romania — Mircea Petescu
Romania — Cornel Pavlovici

==== 1970 FIFA World Cup ====
Romania — Lajos Sătmăreanu
Romania — Gheorghe Tătaru

==== 1984 UEFA Euro ====
Romania — Vasile Iordache

==== 1990 FIFA World Cup ====
Romania — Silviu Lung
Romania — Iosif Rotariu
Romania — Marius Lăcătuș
Romania — Gheorghe Hagi
Romania — Ilie Dumitrescu
Romania — Gavril Balint
Romania — Zsolt Muzsnay

==== 1994 FIFA World Cup ====
Romania — Daniel Prodan
Romania — Ilie Dumitrescu
Romania — Basarab Panduru
Romania — Constantin Gâlcă

==== 1996 UEFA Euro ====
Romania — Bogdan Stelea
Romania — Daniel Prodan
Romania — Marius Lăcătuș
Romania — Constantin Gâlcă
Romania — Anton Doboș
Romania — Iulian Filipescu
Romania — Adrian Ilie
Romania — Ion Vlădoiu

==== 1998 FIFA World Cup ====
Romania — Marius Lăcătuș

==== 2000 UEFA Euro ====
Romania — Laurențiu Roșu
Romania — Miodrag Belodedici
Romania — Eric Lincar

==== 2003 FIFA Confederations Cup ====
Cameroon — Nana Falemi

==== 2004 African Cup of Nations ====
Cameroon — Nana Falemi

==== 2008 Africa Cup of Nations ====
Nigeria — Ifeanyi Emeghara

==== 2008 UEFA Euro ====
Poland — Paweł Golański
Romania — Mirel Rădoi
Romania — Sorin Ghionea
Romania — Dorin Goian
Romania — Bănel Nicoliță
Romania — Nicolae Dică

==== 2010 FIFA World Cup ====
Greece — Pantelis Kapetanos

==== 2015 Africa Cup of Nations ====
Cape Verde — Fernando Varela

==== 2015 CONCACAF Gold Cup ====
Haiti — Jean Sony Alcénat

==== 2016 UEFA Euro ====
Romania — Alexandru Chipciu
Romania — Mihai Pintilii
Romania — Adrian Popa
Romania — Nicolae Stanciu

==== 2020 Summer Olympics ====
Romania — Ștefan Târnovanu

==== 2024 UEFA Euro ====
Romania — Florinel Coman
Romania — Darius Olaru
Romania — Adrian Șut
Romania — Ștefan Târnovanu

=== Club captains ===
Dates	Name	Notes
2022-Present	Darius Olaru	
2018–2022	Florin Tanase	
2017–2018	Denis Alibec	
2016–2017	Mihai Pintilii	
2016	Nicolae Stanciu	
2015–2016	(Cape Verde) Fernando Varela	First foreign player captain at Steaua
2014–2015	Cristian Tănase	
2014	Mihai Pintilii	
2011–2014	Alexandru Bourceanu	
2011	Ciprian Tătărușanu	During the 2010–11 season was captain from 21 rounds to 8 round of season 2011–12.
2010–2011	Cristian Tănase	During the 2010–11 season was captain between 5–20 rounds.
2010	Bănel Nicoliță	During the 2010–11 season was captain on first 4 rounds.
2010	Petre Marin	
2009–2010	Sorin Ghionea	
2002–2009	Mirel Rădoi	When M. Rădoi was long-time injured, the captains where Adrian Neaga, George Ogăraru, Sorin Paraschiv, Nicolae Dică.
1999–2002	Marius Baciu	
1999	Miodrag Belodedici	M. Belodedici is the only Romanian player who won Champions League twice with two different teams and the first in the world to achieve this feat.
1994–1999	Marius Lăcătuș	M. Lăcătuș is currently the most domestically awarded player of all time.
1991–1994	Ilie Dumitrescu	
1991	Dan Petrescu	
1989–1991	Ștefan Iovan	
1982–1989	Tudorel Stoica	T. Stoica is the player with most appearances for Steaua in Romanian Championship.
1980–1982	Anghel Iordănescu	A. Iordănescu is Steaua's top scorer in Romanian Championship.
1975–1980	Liță Dumitru	
1970–1975	Lajos Sătmăreanu	
1969–1970	Carol Creiniceanu	
Unknown–1969	Gheorghe Constantin	
Unknown	Ion Voinescu	
1949–Unknown	Alexandru Apolzan	
1947–1949	Gheorghe Popescu I	

=== Foreign players ===
Country	Player name	Period	Position	Matches	Goals
Albania	Elton Çeno	1998–1999	Midfielder	5	0
Albania	Albert Duro	1998–2001	Defender	27	0
Algeria	Jugurtha Hamroun^{3}	2015–2017	Midfielder	0	0
Algeria	Aymen Tahar^{9}	2015–2016	Midfielder	15	1
Argentina	Pablo Brandán	2010–2012	Midfielder / Defender	43	0
Armenia	Arman Karamyan	2010	Striker	13	5
Armenia	Artavazd Karamyan	2010	Midfielder	8	0
Angola	Carlos Fernandes^{1}	2006	Goalkeeper	22	0
Belarus	Vasil Khamutowski	2003–2006	Goalkeeper	50	0
Bolivia	Ricardo Pedriel	2008–2009	Forward	4	0
Bosnia and Herzegovina	Zoran Novaković	1999–2000	Midfielder	6	0
Bosnia and Herzegovina	Boris Keča	2004	Defender	1	0
Bosnia and Herzegovina	Bojan Golubović	2016–2017	Forward	0	0
Brazil	Andrey	2007	Goalkeeper	6	0
Brazil	Élton	2007	Midfielder	8	1
Brazil	Arthuro	2008	Forward	9	1
Brazil	André Nunes^{√}	2008	Forward	0	0
Brazil	Éder Bonfim	2010–2011	Defender	19	0
Brazil	Ricardo Vilana	2010–2011	Midfielder	16	0
Brazil	Maicon	2011	Forward	6	3
Brazil	Leandro Tatu	2011–2012; 2013	Forward	44	6
Brazil	Gabriel Machado	2012	Forward	3	0
Brazil	Adi Rocha	2012–2013	Forward	16	9
Brazil	Guilherme Sityá^{7}	2015–2016	Defender	35	0
Bulgaria	Krum Bibishkov	2009–2010	Forward	1	0
Bulgaria	Zhivko Zhelev	2010	Defender	16	1
Bulgaria	Yordan Todorov^{√}	2010	Defender	0	0
Bulgaria	Stanislav Angelov	2010–2011	Midfielder / Defender	3	0
Bulgaria	Valentin Iliev	2011–2012	Defender	26	4
Cameroon	Nana Falemi^{2}	2000–2005	Midfielder	94	6
Cape Verde	Fernando Varela^{7}	2013–2016	Defender	36	6
Central African Republic	Habib Habibou^{3}	2008	Forward	7	1
Colombia	Róbinson Zapata	2007–2010	Goalkeeper	85	0
Colombia	Pepe Moreno	2008; 2010	Forward	21	5
Colombia	Dayro Moreno	2008–2010	Midfielder	43	12
Colombia	Juan Carlos Toja	2008–2010	Midfielder	51	3
Croatia	Adnan Aganović	2016–2017	Midfielder	0	0
Cyprus	Stelios Parpas	2010	Defender	13	0
France	Harlem Gnohéré	2017-2020	Forward	92	41
France	Cyril Théréau	2006–2007	Forward	17	10
France	Grégory Tadé	2015–2016	Forward	24	4
Germany	Timo Gebhart	2016	Midfielder	5	0
Ghana	Sulley Muniru	2015–2017	Midfielder	0	0
Greece	Pantelis Kapetanos	2008–2011; 2013–2014	Forward	73	30
Haiti	Jean Sony Alcénat	2015–2016	Defender	7	0
Israel	Klemi Saban	2006–2007	Defender	8	0
Italy	Federico Piovaccari	2013–2014	Forward	25	10
Jordan	Tha'er Bawab^{10}	2016	Forward	8	1
Lithuania	Giedrius Arlauskis	2014–2015	Goalkeeper	25	0
(North Macedonia) Macedonia	Daniel Georgievski^{5}	2012–2014	Defender	28	1
(North Macedonia) Macedonia	Martin Bogatinov	2014	Goalkeeper	0	0
Moldova	Cătălin Carp^{2}	2015–2016	Defender	9	0
Montenegro	Stefan Nikolić	2011–2012; 2012–2013	Forward	48	7
Montenegro	Risto Radunović	2021–present	Defender	186	6
Morocco	Houssine Kharja^{3}	2015–2016	Attacking Midfielder	8	0
Netherlands	Nicandro Breeveld^{8}	2014–2016	Midfielder	37	1
Nigeria	Ifeanyi Emeghara	2007–2011; 2011	Defender	42	0
Nigeria	Dino Eze^{√}	2008	Midfielder	0	0
Peru	Andrés Mendoza	2008	Forward	15	2
Poland	Paweł Golański	2007–2010	Defender	58	2
Poland	Rafał Grzelak	2009–2010	Midfielder	6	0
Poland	Łukasz Szukała^{6}	2012–2015	Defender	65	12
Portugal	Tiago Gomes	2008–2009	Midfielder	24	0
Portugal	António Semedo	2008–2009	Winger	24	3
Portugal	Miguel Tininho^{4}	2009	Defender	0	0
Portugal	Geraldo Alves	2010–2012	Defender	54	3
Senegal	Gora Tall^{√}	2010	Defender	0	0
Serbia	Bogdan Planić	2017-2020	Defender	71	1
Serbia	Novak Martinović	2010–2012	Defender	32	6
Serbia	Marko Momčilović	2016–2020	Defender	0	0
Spain	Abel Moreno	2008	Midfielder	2	0

^{Notes:}
^{^0. Matches and goals only from Liga I.}
^{^1. Has triple citizenship; second is Portuguese and third is Congolese.}
^{^2. Has dual citizenship; second is Romanian.}
^{^3. Has dual citizenship; second is French.}
^{^4. Has dual citizenship; second is Mozambican.}
^{^5. Has dual citizenship; second is Australian.}
^{^6. Has dual citizenship; second is German.}
^{^7. Has dual citizenship; second is Portuguese.}
^{^8. Has dual citizenship; second is Surinamese.}
^{^9. Has dual citizenship; second is English.}
^{^10. Has dual citizenship; second is Spanish.}
^{^√. Only signed contract, never played in official matches for first team.}

== See also ==
- List of
FCSB seasons
