= 1951 Cupa României final =

- Event: 1951 Cupa României
CCA București	Flacăra Mediaș
3	1
- Date: 8 November 1951
- Venue: Republicii, Bucharest
- Referee: Gheorghe Ionescu (Orașul Stalin)
- Attendance: 25,000

The 1951 Cupa României final was the 14th final of Romania's most prestigious football cup competition. It was disputed between CCA București and Flacăra Mediaș, and was won by CCA București after a game with four goals. It was the third cup title in the history of CCA București.

Flacăra Mediaș was the second club representing Divizia B which reached the Romanian Cup final, after CAM Timișoara which accomplished this in 1938.

== Match details ==
8 November 1951
14:30 EET

CCA București	3–1 (a.e.t.)	Flacăra Mediaș
Drăgan 49', 111'; Moldoveanu 112'	Report	Coman 71'

Republicii, Bucharest
Attendance: 25,000
Referee: Gheorghe Ionescu (Orașul Stalin)

GK	1	(Romania) Ion Voinescu
DF	2	(Romania) Vasile Zavoda
DF	3	(Romania) Alexandru Apolzan
MF	4	(Romania) Ștefan Rodeanu
MF	5	(Romania) Ștefan Balint
MF	6	(Romania) Tiberiu Bone
FW	7	(Romania) Petre Moldoveanu
FW	8	(Romania) Nicolae Roman
FW	9	(Romania) Nicolae Drăgan
FW	10	(Romania) Francisc Zavoda
FW	11	(Romania) Petre Bădeanțu
Manager:
(Romania) Gheorghe Popescu I

GK	1	(Romania) Ioan Varday
DF	2	(Romania) Mihai Luca
DF	3	(Romania) L.Szabó
MF	4	(Romania) Victor Dumitrescu
MF	5	(Romania) Molnar
MF	6	(Romania) Ion Costea
FW	7	(Romania) Iuliu Pop
FW	8	(Romania) Ioan Papay
FW	9	(Romania) Șarlea (substituted off)
FW	10	(Romania) Szasz
FW	11	(Romania) T. Moldoveanu
Substitutions:
FW	12	(Romania) A.Coman (substituted on)
Manager:
(Romania) Ștefan Dobay

== See also ==
- List of Cupa României finals
