= 1952 Cupa României final =

- Event: 1952 Cupa României
| CCA București | Flacăra Ploieşti |
| 2 | 0 |
- Date: 7 December 1952
- Venue: Republicii, Bucharest
- Referee: Andrei Bölöni (Oraşul Stalin)
- Attendance: 15,000

The 1952 Cupa României final was the 15th final of Romania's most prestigious football cup competition. It was disputed between CCA București and Flacăra Ploieşti, and was won by CCA București after a game with 2 goals. It was the fourth cup title, all in row, in the history of CCA București.

== Match details ==
7 December 1952
13:15 EET

| CCA București | 2–0 | Flacăra Ploieşti |
|---|---|---|
| Moldovan 9'; Drăgan 56' | Report |

Republicii, Bucharest
Attendance: 15,000
Referee: Andrei Bölöni (Oraşul Stalin)

| GK | 1 | (Romania) Costică Toma |
| DF | 2 | (Romania) Vasile Zavoda |
| DF | 3 | (Romania) Alexandru Apolzan (substituted off) 43' |
| MF | 4 | (Romania) Victor Dumitrescu |
| MF | 5 | (Romania) Ștefan Balint |
| MF | 6 | (Romania) Tiberiu Bone |
| FW | 7 | (Romania) Victor Moldovan |
| FW | 8 | (Romania) Francisc Zavoda |
| FW | 9 | (Romania) Nicolae Drăgan |
| FW | 10 | (Romania) Iosif Petschovski |
| FW | 11 | (Romania) Petre Moldoveanu |
Substitutions:
| DF | 12 | (Romania) Traian Ivănescu (substituted in) 43' |
Manager:
(Romania) Gheorghe Popescu I

| GK | 1 | (Romania) Petre Carapeţ |
| DF | 2 | (Romania) Gheorghe Pahonțu |
| DF | 3 | (Romania) Gheorghe Petrescu |
| MF | 4 | (Romania) Florian Marinescu |
| MF | 5 | (Romania) Constantin Garbelotti |
| MF | 6 | (Romania) Daniel Peretz |
| FW | 7 | (Romania) Traian Iordache |
| FW | 8 | (Romania) Florea Fătu |
| FW | 9 | (Romania) Constantin Titi Popescu |
| FW | 10 | (Romania) Augustin Botescu |
| FW | 11 | (Romania) Ştefan Bădin (substituted off) 75' |
Substitutions:
| FW | 12 | (Romania) Pavel Bădulescu-Bardatz (substituted in) 75' |
Manager:
(Romania) Ilie Oană

== See also ==
- List of Cupa României finals
