= FCM Bacău league record by opponent =

FCM Bacău is an association football club based in Bacău, Romania. The club was founded in 1950 and was promoted for the first to the top league of Romanian football in the 1956 season.

FCM Bacău played their first top league fixture on 18 March 1956 against Dinamo București. Since that game they have played in 1319 first league matches and have faced 52 different sides. Their most regular opponents have been Dinamo București, whom they have played against on 84 occasions. The club has won 31 of the league matches against Argeș Pitești which represents the most Bacău have won against any team. They have drawn more matches with Brașov than with any other club, with 20 of their meetings finishing without a winner. Steaua București are the side that has defeated Bacău in more league games than any other club, having won 52 of their encounters.

== Key ==
- The table includes results of matches played by FCM Bacău in Liga I.
- ‡ Clubs with this background and symbol in the "opponent" column are defunct
- The name used for each opponent is the name they had when FCM Bacău most recently played a league match against them. Results against each opponent include results against that club under any former name. For example, results against Universitatea Cluj include matches played against Știința Cluj.
- P = matches played; W = matches won; D = matches drawn; L = matches lost; F = goals for; A = goals against; Win% = percentage of total matches won
- The columns headed "first" and "last" contain the first and most recent seasons in which FCM Bacău played league matches against each opponent

== All-time league record ==
Statistics correct as of matches played on season 2005-06.

Opponent	P	W	D	L	F	A	P	W	D	L	F	A	P	W	D	L	F	A	Win%	First	Last	Notes	
Opponent	Home						Away						Total						Win%	First	Last	Notes	
ASA Târgu Mureș (1962) ‡	20	18	2	0	35	8		20	1	5	14	15	39		40	19	7	14	50	47	47.50	1967–68	1991–92
Argeș Pitești	36	28	5	3	78	29		36	3	8	25	27	79		72	31	13	28	105	108	43.06	1961–62	2005–06
Astra Giurgiu	5	4	0	1	9	4		5	0	2	3	2	6		10	4	2	4	11	10	40.00	1998–99	2002–03
Bihor Oradea ‡	15	10	4	1	24	5		15	3	0	12	14	30		30	13	4	13	38	35	43.33	1968–69	2003–04
CA Oradea	2	1	1	0	5	3		2	1	0	1	2	3		4	2	1	1	7	6	50.00	1956	1962–63
CFR Cluj	8	5	2	1	12	5		8	0	1	7	1	13		16	5	3	8	13	18	31.25	1969–70	2005–06
CFR Timișoara	2	1	1	0	1	0		2	0	0	2	1	6		4	1	1	2	2	6	25.00	1956	1970–71
CSM Reșița	9	7	1	1	12	1		9	1	3	5	6	14		18	8	4	6	18	15	44.44	1972–73	1999–00
CSM Suceava ‡	1	1	0	0	1	0		1	0	1	0	0	0		2	1	1	0	1	0	50.00	1987–88	1987–88
Ceahlăul Piatra Neamț	9	4	5	0	9	2		9	0	1	8	4	20		18	4	6	8	13	22	22.22	1995–96	2003–04
Chimia Râmnicu Vâlcea ‡	9	8	1	0	15	3		9	2	0	7	9	20		18	10	1	7	24	23	55.56	1978–79	1986–87
Corvinul Hunedoara	16	12	4	0	32	8		16	1	1	14	15	46		32	13	5	14	47	54	40.63	1960–61	1991–92
Dacia Unirea Brăila	3	1	1	1	3	3		3	0	0	3	1	5		6	1	1	4	4	8	16.67	1990–91	1992–93
Dinamo București	42	14	13	15	47	50		42	2	5	35	29	109		84	16	18	50	76	159	19.05	1956	2005–06
Dinamo Cluj ‡	1	0	0	1	1	3		1	1	0	0	2	1		2	1	0	1	3	4	50.00	1956	1956
Dinamo Onești ‡	2	2	0	0	5	1		2	0	1	1	2	3		4	2	1	1	7	4	50.00	1998–99	1999–00
Dunărea Galați ‡	4	3	1	0	11	3		4	1	1	2	1	3		8	4	2	2	12	6	50.00	1976–77	1983–84
FC Brașov	31	17	10	4	45	21		31	5	10	16	22	43		62	22	20	20	67	64	35.48	1958–59	2004–05
FC Caracal ‡	3	3	0	0	6	0		3	1	0	2	3	6		6	4	0	2	9	6	66.67	1991–92	1999–00
FC U Craiova	12	6	4	2	20	9		12	3	4	5	9	17		24	9	8	7	29	26	37.50	1991–92	2004–05
FC Vaslui	1	0	0	1	0	2		1	0	1	0	1	1		2	0	1	1	1	3	0.00	2005–06	2005–06
FCM Târgoviște ‡	9	4	5	0	10	4		9	0	5	4	7	13		18	4	10	4	17	17	22.22	1961–62	1997–98
Farul Constanța	31	22	7	2	66	27		31	4	4	23	18	58		62	26	11	25	84	85	41.94	1958–59	2005–06
Flacăra Moreni	4	2	2	0	5	3		4	0	0	4	2	8		8	2	2	4	7	11	25.00	1986–87	1989–90
Foresta Suceava ‡	3	1	2	0	5	2		3	1	1	1	2	3		6	2	3	1	7	5	33.33	1997–98	2000–01
Gaz Metan Mediaș	1	1	0	0	2	1		1	0	1	0	0	0		2	1	1	0	2	1	50.00	2000–01	2000–01
Gloria Bistrița ‡	14	7	3	4	20	16		14	0	1	13	6	27		28	7	4	17	26	43	25.00	1990–91	2005–06
Gloria Buzău ‡	5	3	1	1	8	4		5	1	0	4	2	9		10	4	1	5	10	13	40.00	1978–79	1986–87
Inter Sibiu ‡	6	5	1	0	9	2		6	1	1	4	4	9		12	6	2	4	13	11	50.00	1988–89	1995–96
Jiul Petroșani	27	23	2	2	59	15		27	1	6	20	17	48		54	24	8	22	76	63	44.44	1956	2005–06
Minaur Baia Mare	5	5	0	0	12	1		5	0	0	5	3	15		10	5	0	5	15	16	50.00	1978–79	1984–85
Minerul Lupeni ‡	4	4	0	0	12	1		4	4	0	0	6	1		8	8	0	0	18	2	100.00	1959–60	1962–63
Olimpia Satu Mare	5	3	2	0	7	2		5	1	2	2	5	6		10	4	4	2	12	8	40.00	1975–76	1998–99
Olt Scornicești	11	9	1	1	22	10		11	1	0	10	9	22		22	10	1	11	31	32	45.45	1979–80	1989–90
Oțelul Galați	16	10	3	3	23	10		16	3	3	10	13	26		32	13	6	13	36	36	40.63	1986–87	2005–06
Pandurii Târgu Jiu	1	1	0	0	1	0		1	0	0	1	1	2		2	1	0	1	2	2	50.00	2005–06	2005–06
Petrolul Ploiești	31	23	5	3	56	16	31	3	9	19	24	62	62	26	14	22	80	78	41.94	1956	2003–04		
Politehnica Iași (1945) ‡	19	13	2	4	38	16	19	2	6	11	10	32	38	15	8	15	48	48	39.47	1960–61	2005–06		
Politehnica Timișoara ‡	27	17	8	2	41	10	27	1	5	21	13	66	54	18	13	23	54	76	33.33	1956	2005–06		
Progresul București	24	16	5	3	47	30	24	1	4	19	18	51	48	17	9	22	65	81	35.42	1956	2005–06		
Rapid București	35	24	4	7	52	27	35	5	5	25	23	66	70	29	9	32	75	93	41.43	1956	2005–06		
Rocar ANEFS București ‡	2	2	0	0	4	0	2	0	0	2	0	5	4	2	0	2	4	5	50.00	1999–00	2000–01		
Sportul Studențesc București	27	17	7	3	44	23	27	4	3	20	23	52	54	21	10	23	67	75	38.89	1972–73	2005–06		
Steaua București	42	12	14	16	40	53	42	4	2	36	32	110	54	21	10	23	67	75	38.89	1956	2005–06		
UM Timișoara ‡	1	1	0	0	1	0	1	1	0	0	4	2	2	2	0	0	5	2	100.00	2001–02	2001–02		
UTA Arad	19	13	4	2	26	9	19	2	3	14	10	36	38	15	7	16	36	45	39.47	1956	2002–03		
Unirea Alba Iulia	2	0	1	1	0	1	2	0	1	1	0	2	4	0	2	2	0	3	0.00	2003–04	2004–05		
Universitatea Cluj	28	20	6	2	47	18	28	4	6	18	22	55	56	24	12	20	69	73	42.86	1956	1998–99		
Universitatea Craiova	23	13	7	3	40	19	23	0	1	22	9	57	46	13	8	25	49	76	28.26	1967–68	1990–91		
Vagonul Arad ‡	1	1	0	0	3	0	1	0	1	0	0	0	2	1	1	0	3	0	50.00	1968–69	1968–69		
Victoria București ‡	5	3	0	2	10	4	5	0	1	4	7	16	10	3	1	6	17	20	30.00	1985–86	1989–90		
Viitorul București ‡	1	0	0	1	1	2	0	0	0	0	0	0	1	0	0	1	1	2	0.00	1962–63	1962–63		
