= Zavoda =

Zavoda is a surname. Notable people with the surname include:

- Francisc Zavoda (1927–2011), Romanian footballer and manager
- Vasile Zavoda (1929–2014), Romanian footballer and manager, brother of Francisc
