= Alexandru Apolzan =

Romanian footballer

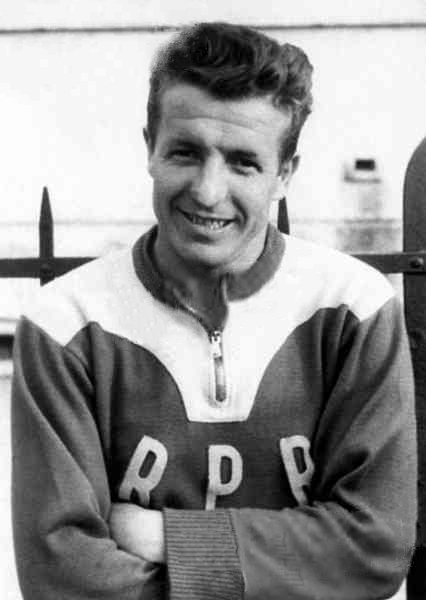
- Apolzan in 1955

Personal information
- Date of birth: 6 February 1927
- Place of birth: Sibiu, Romania
- Date of death: 23 December 1982 (aged 55)
- Place of death: Bucharest, Romania
- Height: 1.76 m (5 ft 9 in)
- Positions: Centre-back; sweeper

Youth career
- 1941–1943: Şoimii Sibiu
- 1945–1946: 23 August București

Senior career*
Years	Team	Apps	(Gls)
1946–1949	CFR București	60	(1)
1949–1962	Steaua București	216	(2)
Total		276	(3)

International career
1949–1960	Romania	22	(0)
- * Club domestic league appearances and goals

Alexandru Apolzan (6 February 1927 – 23 December 1982) was a Romanian footballer, who played as a defender, mainly for Steaua București and also for Romania. He has been credited with the invention of the sweeper role and is considered one of the best sweepers in the history of Romanian football, with only Miodrag Belodedici and Gheorghe Popescu, in recent years, being able to play at a similar level.

== Playing career ==
It was the Romanian Apolzan who first played as sweeper, while at Steaua București. However, Apolzan played during the darkest period in the history of Romania, when the connections with the outside world were almost cut completely.

Apolzan signed his first contract with Şoimii, a local team from Sibiu, in 1941. After the war he joins the squad of CFR Bucharest and then between 1949 and 1962, he played for Steaua București until his retirement.

Hungarian coach Gusztáv Sebes, the builder of the Hungarian team from the first half of the 1950s – the Magical Magyars, said in 1954, after the 1954 FIFA World Cup that Apolzan, Ion Voinescu and Titus Ozon are at the same level as his own Hungarian players and that he would be proud to be able to coach them.

He also won 22 caps for Romania. It was however an era when Romania used to play less than five games per year.

== Honours ==
Steaua Bucharest

- Romanian League (6): 1951, 1952, 1953, 1956, 1960, 1961
- Romanian Cup: 1948–49, 1950, 1951, 1952, 1955

Sporting positions
Preceded by Gheorghe Popescu I	Steaua captain 1949–Unknown	Succeeded by Ion Voinescu
