= Nicolae Roman =

Romanian footballer

Personal information
- Date of birth: 15 September 1926
- Place of birth: Sibiu, Romania
- Date of death: 28 March 2017 (aged 90)
- Position: Striker

Senior career*
Years	Team	Apps	(Gls)
1946–1949	Universitatea Cluj	77	(16)
1950–1951	Steaua București	32	(10)
1952–1953	Locomotiva București		

International career
1952	Romania	1	(0)
- * Club domestic league appearances and goals

Nicolae Roman (born 15 September 1925, date of death unknown) was a Romanian footballer who played as a striker.

== International career ==
Nicolae Roman played one friendly match for Romania, on 26 October 1952 when coach Gheorghe Popescu I sent him on the field in the 66th minute in order to replace Titus Ozon in a 3–1 victory against East Germany.

== Honours ==
Steaua București

- Divizia A: 1951

Locomotiva București

- Divizia B: 1952
