= Florian Marinescu =

Florian Marinescu can refer to:

- Florian Marinescu (canoeist)
- Florian Marinescu (footballer)
