= Gheorghe Popescu (disambiguation) =

Gheorghe Popescu may refer to:

- Gheorghe Popescu (footballer, born 1919), football player
- Gheorghe Popescu (footballer, born 1967), football player
