= Ion Voinescu =

Romanian footballer

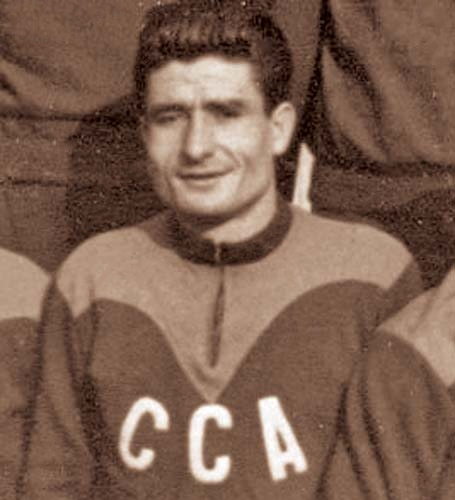
- Voinescu with Steaua (then called CCA)

Personal information
- Date of birth: 18 April 1929
- Place of birth: Valea Dragului, Romania
- Date of death: 9 March 2018 (aged 88)
- Place of death: Bucharest, Romania
- Height: 1.74 m (5 ft 8 1/2 in)
- Position: Goalkeeper

Youth career
- 1939–1943: Olympia București
- 1943–1945: ASPIM București

Senior career*
Years	Team	Apps	(Gls)
1945–1946	Carmen București	1	(0)
1946–1947	Solvay Uioara		
1947–1948	RATA Târgu Mureş	5	(0)
1948–1950	Metalul București^{1}	23	(0)
1950–1963	Steaua București	162	(0)
Total		191	(0)

International career
	Romania B	2	(0)
1949–1962	Romania (Note: Including one appearance for Romania's Olympic team.)	22	(0)
- * Club domestic league appearances and goals

Ion "Țop" Voinescu (18 April 1929 – 9 March 2018) was a Romanian footballer, who is often considered one of the finest goalkeepers Romania has ever produced.

== Career ==
Voinescu joined his first club, Olympia București, in 1939 just before the start of World War II, aged 10. After four years with Olympia, Voinescu left to join another club from Bucharest, ASPIM, but left again after the war's conclusion in 1945, in order to sign his first professional contract with Carmen București, which was one of the best Romanian football teams during the interwar period. However, he ended up leaving the club a year later, when he joined Solvay Uioara.

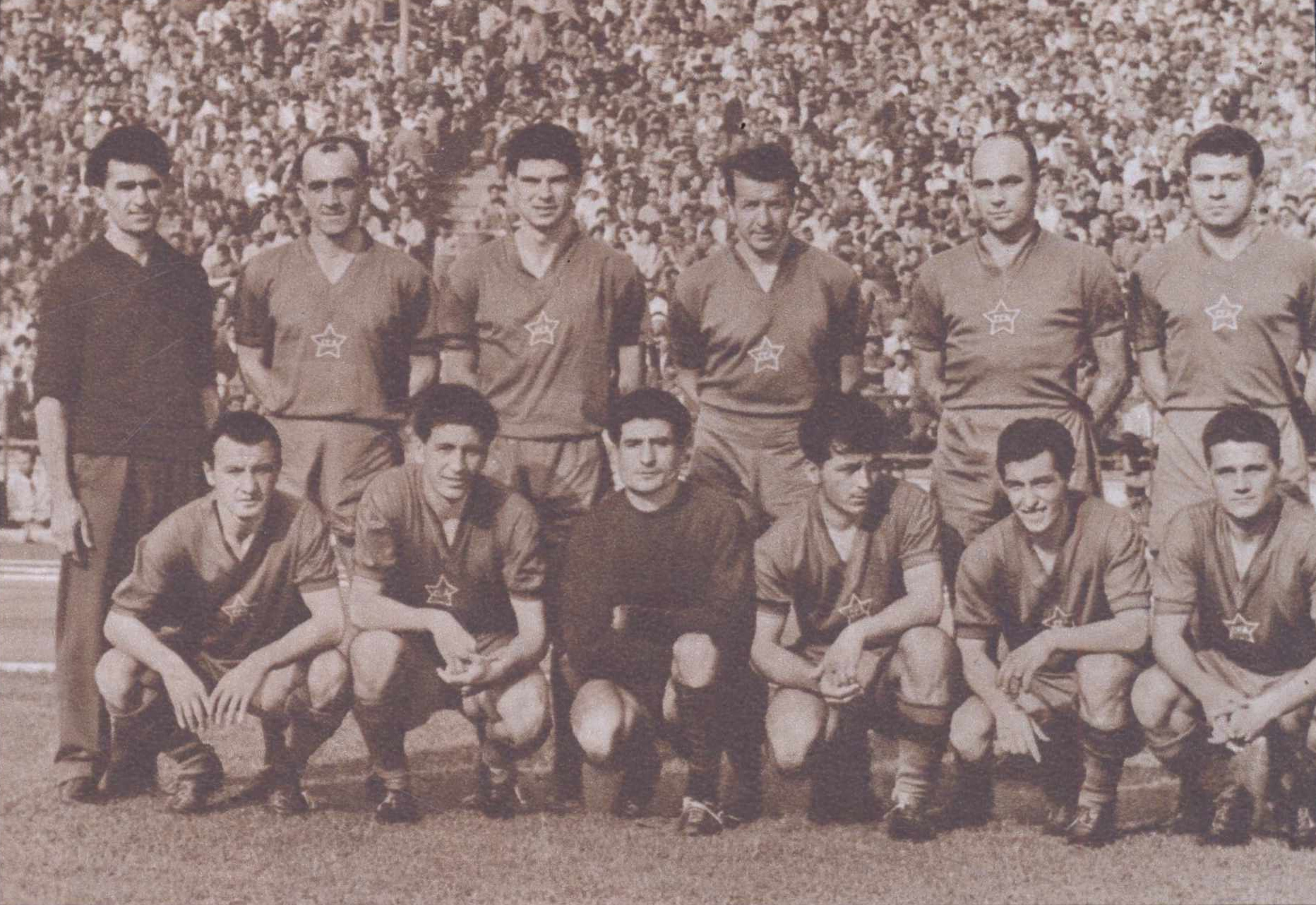
Voinescu (pictured center, front row) with Steaua in 1961

Voinescu left Solvay Uioara a year later to join RATA Târgu Mureș in 1947, where he remained for a year before returning to Bucharest, where he signed for Metalul București. Following a three-year spell with Metalul, Voinescu moved to Steaua București, which was where he remained until his retirement from professional football in 1963, following an eighteen-year professional career.

Voinescu has won 21 caps for Romania, with his only honor being representing his country at the 1952 Summer Olympics.

It was said that Arsenal and Vasco da Gama were both interested in securing his services during his playing career, but was unable to as it was impossible for Voinescu to leave the country due to the strict restrictions of the communist regime.

Voinescu worked as a goalkeeper coach for his former club, Steaua București, on multiple occasions after his retirement, before permanently retiring from coaching in the late 1980s.

On 9 March 2018, Voinescu died at the age of 88.

A street in central Bucharest was named after him.

== Honours ==
=== Club ===
Steaua București

- Romanian League (6): 1951, 1952, 1953, 1956, 1960, 1961
- Romanian Cup (5): 1950, 1951, 1952, 1955, 1962

== Notes ==
^1 The 1950 appearances and goals made for Metalul București are unavailable.

Sporting positions
Preceded by Alexandru Apolzan	Steaua captain Unknown–Unknown	Succeeded by Gheorghe Constantin
