= Gheorghe Cacoveanu =

Romanian footballer

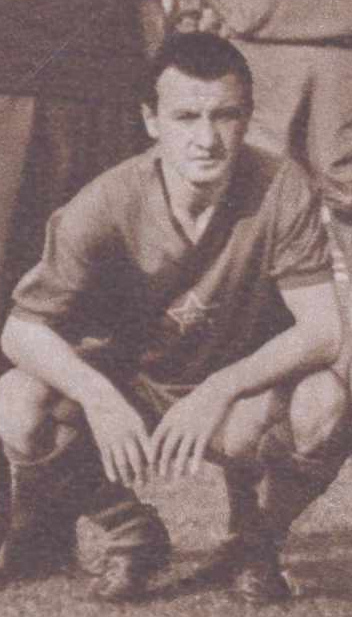

Personal information
- Full name: Gheorghe Cornel Cacoveanu
- Date of birth: 16 September 1935
- Place of birth: Uioara, Romania
- Date of death: 23 November 2001 (aged 66)
- Height: 1.69 m (5 ft 7 in)
- Position: Attacking midfielder

Senior career*
Years	Team	Apps	(Gls)
1951–1955	Metalul Câmpia Turzii	30	(5)
1955	Progresul București	21	(6)
1956–1963	Steaua București	124	(25)
1963–1964	Dinamo Piteşti	11	(1)
1964–1965	Minerul Baia Mare	11	(2)
1965–1967	Tehnomental		
Total		197	(39)

International career
1956–1960	Romania	6	(2)
- * Club domestic league appearances and goals

Gheorghe Cornel Cacoveanu (16 September 1935 – 23 November 2001) was a Romanian footballer who played as an attacking midfielder, most notably for Steaua București.

== Career ==
His debut for Metalul Câmpia Turzii came in 1951. He promoted in the Romanian first division with his team and played well in Divizia A. He moved to Bucharest in 1955 playing only a season for Progresul București before moving to Steaua București. He played nine years for this team, being a part of Steaua's Gold Team. At his end of career, he played for Dinamo Piteşti, Minerul Baia Mare and his last team, the obscure third division club Tehnometal.

== Honours ==
=== Club ===
Steaua București

- Romanian League (3): 1956, 1960, 1961
- Romanian Cup (1): 1962
