= Vasile Mihăilescu =

Romanian footballer

Personal information
- Date of birth: 1936
- Place of birth: Romania
- Height: 1.68 m (5 ft 6 in)
- Position: Midfielder

Senior career*
| Years | Team | Apps | (Gls) |
| 1955–1956 | Progresul CPCS București | | |
| 1957–1958 | Progresul București (Note: The 1957 championship called Cupa Primăverii is unofficial, so the appearances and goals scored at that competition for Progresul București are not official.) | 12 | (0) |
| 1958–1962 | CCA București | 29 | (2) |
| Total | | 41 | (2) |

International career
| 1959 | Romania | 1 | (0) |
- * Club domestic league appearances and goals

Vasile Mihăilescu (born 1936) was a Romanian footballer who played as a midfielder.

== International career ==
Vasile Mihăilescu played one friendly game at international level for Romania, in a 3–2 away victory against Poland.

== Honours ==
CCA București

- Divizia A: 1959–60, 1960–61
- Cupa României: 1961–62
