= Ștefan Balint =

Romanian footballer

Personal information
- Date of birth: 26 January 1926
- Place of birth: Sighișoara, Romania
- Date of death: 1976 (aged 49–50)
- Position: Midfielder

Youth career
- 1941–1944: Kolozsvári AC

Senior career*
| Years | Team | Apps | (Gls) |
| 1945–1947 | Ferar Cluj | 22 | (0) |
| 1948–1949 | CFR Cluj | 52 | (2) |
| 1950–1955 | CCA București | 98 | (1) |
| 1956–1962 | Corvinul Hunedoara (Note: The statistics for the 1956, 1957–58, 1958–59 and 1961–62 Divizia B seasons are unavailable.) | 15 | (0) |
| Total | | 187 | (3) |

International career
| 1952 | Romania | 1 | (0) |
- * Club domestic league appearances and goals

Ștefan Balint (26 January 1926 – 1976) was a Romanian football midfielder.

== International career ==
Ștefan Balint played one friendly game at international level for Romania on 25 May 1952 under coach Gheorghe Popescu I in a 1–0 victory against Poland. He was also part of Romania's squad at the 1952 Summer Olympics.

== Honours ==
CCA București

- Divizia A: 1951, 1952, 1953
- Cupa României: 1950, 1951, 1952
