= Florian Marinescu (footballer) =

Romanian footballer

Personal information
- Date of birth: 1930 (age 95–96)
- Position: Defender

Senior career*
Years	Team	Apps	(Gls)
1948–1953	Flacăra Ploiești		

International career
1952	Romania	1	(0)
- * Club domestic league appearances and goals

Florian Marinescu (born 1930) was a Romanian footballer who played as a defender.

== International career ==
Florian Marinescu played one friendly match for Romania, on 25 May 1952 under coach Gheorghe Popescu I in a 1–0 victory against Poland.

== Honours ==
Flacăra Ploiești

- Divizia B: 1953
