= 1959–60 Divizia A =

42nd season of top-tier football league in Romania

Divizia A
- Season: 1959–60
- Champions: CCA București
- Top goalscorer: Gheorghe Constantin (20)

The 1959–60 Divizia A was the forty-second season of Divizia A, the top-level football league of Romania.

== Teams ==
Location of teams in 1959-60 Divizia A

== League table ==
| Pos | Team | Pld | W | D | L | GF | GA | GD | Pts | Qualification or relegation |
|---|---|---|---|---|---|---|---|---|---|---|
| 1 | CCA București (C) | 22 | 15 | 4 | 3 | 52 | 25 | +27 | 34 | Qualification to European Cup preliminary round |
| 2 | Steagul Roşu Oraşul Stalin | 22 | 9 | 9 | 4 | 47 | 34 | +13 | 27 | Invitation to Balkans Cup |
| 3 | Petrolul Ploiești | 22 | 8 | 8 | 6 | 33 | 23 | +10 | 24 | |
| 4 | Farul Constanța | 22 | 9 | 6 | 7 | 37 | 34 | +3 | 24 | |
| 5 | Știința Cluj | 22 | 7 | 10 | 5 | 34 | 32 | +2 | 24 | |
| 6 | Dinamo Bacău | 22 | 9 | 6 | 7 | 31 | 33 | −2 | 24 | |
| 7 | UTA Arad | 22 | 8 | 6 | 8 | 26 | 30 | −4 | 22 | |
| 8 | Dinamo București | 22 | 6 | 9 | 7 | 29 | 29 | 0 | 21 | |
| 9 | Progresul București | 22 | 7 | 5 | 10 | 36 | 39 | −3 | 19 | |
| 10 | Rapid București | 22 | 5 | 8 | 9 | 30 | 34 | −4 | 18 | |
| 11 | Minerul Lupeni | 22 | 5 | 6 | 11 | 27 | 37 | −10 | 16 | |
| 12 | Jiul Petroșani (R) | 22 | 2 | 7 | 13 | 17 | 49 | −32 | 11 | Relegation to Divizia B |

Source: LT
Rules for classification: 1) points; 2) goal average; 3) number of goals scored
(C) Champions; (R) Relegated

=== Results ===
| Home \ Away | CCA | BAC | DIN | FAR | JIU | MIN | PET | PRO | RAP | STR | UTA | ȘCJ |
|---|---|---|---|---|---|---|---|---|---|---|---|---|
| CCA București | — | 3–0 | 3–3 | 3–2 | 2–0 | 6–1 | 1–0 | 4–1 | 1–1 | 2–1 | 1–0 | 2–2 |
| Dinamo Bacău | 1–2 | — | 1–4 | 4–3 | 3–1 | 2–1 | 1–0 | 3–0 | 0–0 | 1–1 | 1–2 | 0–0 |
| Dinamo București | 2–1 | 0–2 | — | 1–1 | 3–1 | 0–0 | 1–3 | 0–1 | 2–0 | 2–2 | 2–2 | 0–0 |
| Farul Constanța | 0–3 | 2–0 | 3–1 | — | 5–0 | 1–1 | 1–1 | 1–0 | 1–0 | 2–0 | 2–0 | 3–2 |
| Jiul Petroșani | 1–2 | 0–0 | 0–0 | 1–1 | — | 1–0 | 0–0 | 1–1 | 2–2 | 2–3 | 2–0 | 1–1 |
| Minerul Lupeni | 0–1 | 1–2 | 2–2 | 4–0 | 4–0 | — | 1–2 | 4–1 | 2–1 | 1–1 | 1–0 | 2–2 |
| Petrolul Ploiești | 1–2 | 1–3 | 0–2 | 2–0 | 7–0 | 2–1 | — | 0–1 | 1–1 | 1–1 | 2–0 | 2–0 |
| Progresul București | 2–2 | 5–2 | 1–1 | 1–2 | 2–1 | 7–0 | 2–3 | — | 0–2 | 1–2 | 1–1 | 0–0 |
| Rapid București | 2–5 | 1–2 | 1–0 | 3–3 | 5–1 | 2–0 | 1–1 | 3–2 | — | 1–1 | 0–1 | 1–2 |
| Steagul Roşu Oraşul Stalin | 2–1 | 2–2 | 1–2 | 3–2 | 2–1 | 2–0 | 1–1 | 7–4 | 4–1 | — | 2–2 | 7–1 |
| UTA Arad | 1–4 | 3–0 | 2–0 | 1–1 | 3–0 | 1–0 | 1–1 | 0–2 | 2–1 | 1–1 | — | 2–1 |
| Știința Cluj | 2–1 | 1–1 | 2–1 | 3–1 | 3–1 | 1–1 | 2–2 | 0–1 | 1–1 | 3–1 | 5–1 | — |

Source: LT (in Romanian)
Legend: Blue = home team win; Yellow = draw; Red = away team win.

== Top goalscorers ==
| Rank | Player | Club | Goals |
|---|---|---|---|
| 1 | Gheorghe Constantin | CCA București | 20 |
| 2 | Titus Ozon | Rapid București | 12 |
| 3 | Gheorghe Ene | Rapid București | 11 |
| 4 | Iacob Olaru | Farul Constanța | 10 |
| 4 | Nicolae Tătaru | CCA București | 10 |

== Champion squad ==
CCA București

Goalkeepers: Ion Voinescu (16 / 0); Costică Toma (6 / 0).
Defenders: Vasile Zavoda (21 / 0); Alexandru Apolzan (11 / 0); Traian Ivănescu (10 / 0); Alexandru Dragomirescu (2 / 0); Gheorghe Staicu (8 / 0); Ferdinand Cepolski (3 / 0).
Midfielders: Emerich Jenei (19 / 0); Tiberiu Bone (14 / 1); Vasile Mihăilescu (14 / 1).
Forwards: Gheorghe Cacoveanu (20 / 5); Gheorghe Constantin (21 / 20); Ion Alecsandrescu (20 / 7); Francisc Zavoda (14 / 0); Gabriel Raksi (21 / 5); Nicolae Tătaru (19 / 10); Ion Crișan (1 / 0); Alexandru Constantinescu (2 / 2).
(league appearances and goals listed in brackets)

Manager: Gheorghe Popescu I.

== See also ==
- 1959–60 Divizia B
