= 1953 Divizia A =

36th season of top-tier football league in Romania

Divizia A
- Season: 1953
- Champions: CCA București
- Top goalscorer: Titus Ozon (12)

The 1953 Divizia A was the thirty-sixth season of Divizia A, the top-level football league of Romania.

== Teams ==
Location of teams in 1953 Divizia A

== League table ==
Pos	Team	Pld	W	D	L	GF	GA	GD	Pts	Qualification or relegation
1	CCA București (C)	21	11	6	4	27	14	+13	28	Champions of Romania
2	Dinamo București	21	10	5	6	37	29	+8	25	
3	Flamura Roșie Arad	21	9	6	6	31	24	+7	24	
4	Dinamo Orașul Stalin	21	7	9	5	35	27	+8	23	
5	Locomotiva București	21	5	11	5	23	22	+1	21	
6	Știința Timișoara	21	6	8	7	19	22	−3	20	
7	Locomotiva Târgu Mureş	21	7	4	10	28	35	−7	18	
8	Știința Cluj	21	7	4	10	24	31	−7	18	
9	Minerul Petroșani	21	6	6	9	23	32	−9	18	
10	Locomotiva Timișoara	21	4	9	8	14	23	−9	17	
11	CA Câmpulung Moldovenesc	11	5	5	1	14	6	+8	15	Disbanded after the first part of the season. (Note: CA Câmpulung Moldovenesc was disbanded in the summer of 1953, after the first part of the season.)
12	Progresul Oradea	21	5	5	11	19	29	−10	15	

Source: LT
Rules for classification: 1) points; 2) goal average; 3) number of goals scored
(C) Champions

=== Results ===
Home \ Away	CAM	CCA	DIN	DOS	FRA	LBU	LTI	TÂR	MIP	ORA	ȘCJ	ȘTI
CA Câmpulung	—	2–1	2–1	1–1	3–0	—	0–0	0–1	—	—	—	—
CCA București	—	—	1–3	0–0	0–0	1–0	4–0	2–1	1–1	3–1	1–0	0–0
Dinamo București	—	2–1	—	3–2	1–1	2–1	1–1	1–0	3–3	4–1	2–0	0–0
Dinamo Orașul Stalin	—	3–4	3–1	—	2–1	2–2	3–0	2–0	4–1	2–2	0–1	1–3
Flamura Roșie Arad	—	1–1	2–1	2–2	—	0–1	3–1	1–2	1–0	0–0	5–2	2–0
Locomotiva București	1–1	1–1	2–0	1–1	1–3	—	1–2	1–1	4–1	1–1	0–0	1–1
Locomotiva Timișoara	—	0–1	0–0	0–0	1–2	0–0	—	0–1	0–0	1–0	2–0	1–2
Locomotiva Târgu Mureş	—	0–3	3–2	3–5	3–0	2–2	1–1	—	0–2	5–2	0–1	1–2
Minerul Petroșani	1–1	1–0	0–2	1–0	2–5	0–1	1–1	0–3	—	1–0	3–0	2–0
Progresul Oradea	0–1	1–2	0–2	1–1	1–0	0–1	2–0	2–0	2–0	—	0–0	3–0
Știința Cluj	0–3	0–2	4–2	2–2	0–2	3–1	0–2	5–0	3–3	1–0	—	0–1
Știința Timișoara	0–0	0–1	2–4	1–2	0–0	0–0	1–1	1–1	1–0	4–0	0–2	—

Source: LT (in Romanian)
Legend: Blue = home team win; Yellow = draw; Red = away team win.

== Top goalscorers ==
Rank	Player	Club	Goals
1	Titus Ozon	Dinamo București	12
2	Desideriu Józsi	Locomotiva Târgu Mureş	10
3	Iuliu Farkaș	Minerul Petroșani	9
3	Gheorghe Váczi	Flamura Roșie Arad	9
5	Vichentie Birău	Dinamo Orașul Stalin	8
5	Nicolae Dumitru	Dinamo București	8

== Champion squad ==
CCA București

Goalkeepers: Costică Toma (7 / 0); Ion Voinescu (8 / 0); Liviu Coman (7 / 0).
Defenders: Vasile Zavoda (10 / 0); Alexandru Apolzan (13 / 1); Traian Ivănescu (20 / 1); Nicolae Topșa (3 / 0); Victor Dumitrescu (8 / 0); Nicolae Dodeanu (7 / 0); Alexandru Karikaș (6 / 0).
Midfielders: Ștefan Balint (13 / 0); Tiberiu Bone (20 / 4); Ștefan Onisie (2 / 0).
Forwards: Victor Moldovan (17 / 7); Francisc Zavoda (11 / 2); József Pecsovszky (10 / 3); Nicolae Drăgan (14 / 2); Mihai Flamaropol (8 / 1); Nicolae Tătaru (10 / 0); Petre Moldoveanu (12 / 0); Petre Bădeanțu (8 / 0); Constantin Titi Popescu (2 / 0); Iosif Kajlik (4 / 0); Iosif Meszaros (3 / 0); Mihai Smărăndescu (1 / 0); Ion Alecsandrescu (8 / 2); Ladislau Vlad (5 / 0).
(league appearances and goals listed in brackets)

Manager: Gheorghe Popescu I / Ferenc Rónay / Ilie Savu.

== See also ==
- 1953 Divizia B
