= 1956 Divizia A =

39th season of top-tier football league in Romania

Divizia A
- Season: 1956
- Champions: CCA București
- Top goalscorer: Ion Alecsandrescu (18)

The 1956 Divizia A was the thirty-ninth season of Divizia A, the top-level football league of Romania.

== Teams ==
Location of teams in 1956 Divizia A

== League table ==
Pos	Team	Pld	W	D	L	GF	GA	GD	Pts	Qualification or relegation
1	CCA București (C)	24	15	3	6	64	28	+36	33	Qualification to European Cup first round
2	Dinamo București	24	13	3	8	48	34	+14	29	
3	Știința Timișoara	24	11	7	6	40	31	+9	29	
4	Locomotiva București	24	9	10	5	46	27	+19	28	
5	Energia Ploiești	24	9	9	6	42	25	+17	27	
6	Flamura Roșie Arad	24	9	6	9	37	40	−3	24	
7	Dinamo Orașul Stalin	24	9	5	10	36	38	−2	23	
8	Progresul Oradea	24	10	3	11	29	45	−16	23	
9	Progresul București	24	8	6	10	34	39	−5	22	
10	Minerul Petroșani	24	8	6	10	29	35	−6	22	
11	Locomotiva Timișoara (R)	24	5	9	10	20	39	−19	19	Relegation to Divizia B
12	Știința Cluj (R)	24	6	5	13	22	48	−26	17	Relegation to Divizia B
13	Dinamo Bacău (R)	24	6	4	14	24	42	−18	16	Relegation to Divizia B

Source: LT
Rules for classification: 1) points; 2) goal average; 3) number of goals scored
(C) Champions; (R) Relegated

=== Results ===
Home \ Away	CCA	BAC	DIN	DOS	ENP	FRA	LBU	LTI	MIP	ORA	PRO	ȘCJ	ȘTI
CCA București	—	0–1	4–3	3–1	2–0	5–1	1–1	6–0	6–0	5–0	1–1	3–0	1–2
Dinamo Bacău	0–8	—	0–1	1–3	2–0	0–2	0–2	0–0	1–1	4–2	2–1	0–1	5–0
Dinamo București	0–4	2–1	—	2–1	2–1	3–2	2–3	1–0	0–0	3–0	2–3	8–0	4–1
Dinamo Orașul Stalin	0–1	1–2	1–0	—	1–1	0–0	0–2	0–1	0–4	2–0	3–0	3–1	1–1
Energia Ploiești	3–0	3–0	1–3	1–1	—	9–0	1–1	2–2	3–1	2–0	0–0	1–1	1–1
Flamura Roșie Arad	0–1	1–0	2–3	1–1	1–1	—	3–2	1–1	2–1	2–0	3–3	3–0	1–2
Locomotiva București	2–4	1–1	2–3	5–1	1–2	1–1	—	5–0	1–1	4–1	1–1	3–0	4–0
Locomotiva Timișoara	4–3	4–1	1–0	1–5	1–4	1–3	0–0	—	1–2	1–1	0–0	0–0	0–0
Energia Petroșani	0–1	1–1	0–0	1–2	3–1	1–0	0–0	0–1	—	4–0	3–0	3–1	2–1
Progresul Oradea	3–1	3–1	1–0	2–6	1–0	1–0	1–1	2–0	2–0	—	2–1	0–0	1–5
Progresul București	1–4	1–0	1–3	5–1	0–2	1–2	3–1	1–0	5–1	0–1	—	2–1	2–2
Știința Cluj	0–0	1–0	2–2	2–0	1–3	0–4	1–3	1–0	4–0	2–5	1–2	—	2–0
Știința Timișoara	5–0	3–1	3–1	1–2	0–0	3–2	0–0	1–1	2–0	1–0	3–0	3–0	—

Source: LT (in Romanian)
Legend: Blue = home team win; Yellow = draw; Red = away team win.

== Top goalscorers ==
Rank	Player	Club	Goals
1	Ion Alecsandrescu	CCA București	18
2	Alexandru Ene	Dinamo București	17
3	Titus Ozon	Progresul București	16
4	Ion Ciosescu	Știința Timișoara	15
4	Gheorghe Constantin	CCA București	15
4	Iacob Olaru	Locomotiva București	15

== Champion squad ==
CCA București

Goalkeepers: Ion Voinescu (12 / 0); Costică Toma (12 / 0).
Defenders: Vasile Zavoda (22 / 0); Alexandru Apolzan (22 / 0); Victor Dumitrescu (19 / 0); Traian Ivănescu (12 / 0); Constantin Dragomirescu (1 / 0); Alexandru Rădulescu (1 / 0).
Midfielders: Ștefan Onisie (23 / 4); Tiberiu Bone (21 / 1); Gheorghe Staicu (1 / 0); Mircea Bibere (1 / 0).
Forwards: Gheorghe Cacoveanu (20 / 10); Gheorghe Constantin (20 / 15); Ion Alecsandrescu (22 / 18); Francisc Zavoda (19 / 4); Nicolae Tătaru (20 / 7); Victor Moldovan (6 / 3); Gheorghe Nertea (2 / 0); Iosif Bükössy (3 / 0); Marcel Marin (4 / 2); Ion Ghibea (1 / 0).
(league appearances and goals listed in brackets)

Manager: Ștefan Dobay.

== See also ==
- 1956 Divizia B
