= Nicolae Tătaru =

Romanian footballer (1931–2001)

Nicolae Tătaru I
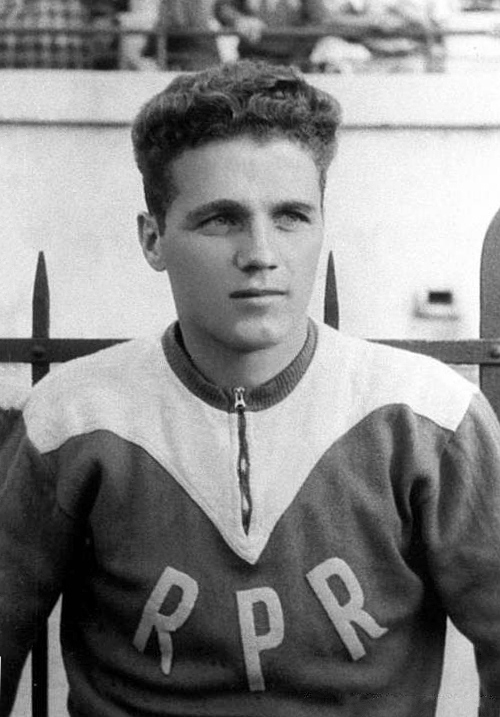
- Tătaru in 1955

Personal information
- Date of birth: 16 December 1931
- Place of birth: Sibiu, Romania
- Date of death: 1 August 2001 (aged 69)
- Height: 1.69 m (5 ft 7 in)
- Position: Forward

Youth career
- 1949–1952: Locomotiva Turnu Severin

Senior career*
| Years | Team | Apps | (Gls) |
| 1952 | Armata Craiova | | |
| 1953–1964 | Steaua București | 210 | (75) |
| Total | | 210 | (75) |

International career
| 1954–1962 | Romania | 21 | (2) |

Managerial career
- 1965–1969: Steaua București (youth)
- 1970–1976: CS Târgovişte
- 1976–1977: FC Brăila
- 1977–1980: Flacăra Moreni
- 1980–1982: Petrolul Târgovişte
- * Club domestic league appearances and goals

Nicolae Tătaru (16 December 1931 – 1 August 2001), also known as Tătaru I, was a Romanian footballer. He played eleven years for Steaua București, being one of the symbols of the team. He played as a left forward. He was the older brother of Gheorghe Tătaru who also played professional football at Steaua București.

== Playing career ==
Nicolae Tătaru signed with Steaua București in 1952, after three months when he played for one of Steaua's second teams, Armata Craiova. He was a part of Steaua's Golden team, playing also for the Romania national team. He earned 21 caps for Romania, scoring two goals. His debut for the national team came on 9 May 1954, when Romania won the match against East Germany, played at Berlin in front of 90,000 people. He scored his first international goal, against Greece, in 1957. In 1959, in the match against the olympic team of the Soviet Union, he was the captain of the national team. Since then he was eight times the captain of the national team. In his last match for Romania, in which he was also the captain, Romania lost the friendly match against Morocco. At Steaua, he played 210 matches and scored 75 goals. He is tenth in the Top Ten list of Steaua's goalscorers.

== Managerial career ==
Tătaru managed several clubs, like CS Târgovişte, FC Brăila, Petrolul Târgovişte or Steaua's youth team.

== Honours ==
=== Player ===
Steaua București

- Romanian League: 1953, 1956, 1960, 1961
- Romanian Cup: 1955, 1962
