= Vasile Zavoda =

Romanian footballer (1929–2014)

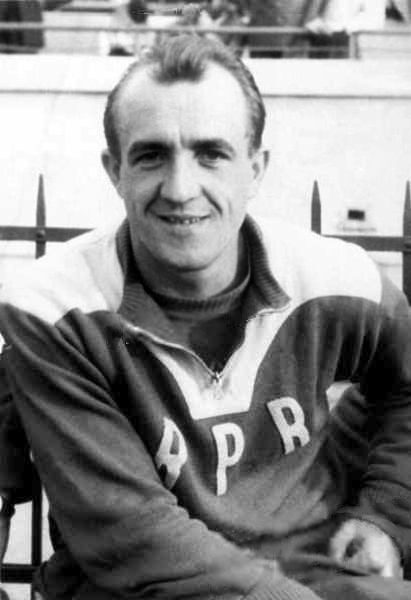
- Zavoda in 1955

Personal information
- Date of birth: 26 July 1929
- Place of birth: Rodna Veche, Romania
- Date of death: 14 July 2014 (aged 84)
- Place of death: București, Romania
- Height: 1.74 m (5 ft 9 in)
- Position: Defender

Youth career
- 1947–1948: FC Minaur Baia Mare

Senior career*
Years	Team	Apps	(Gls)
1950	FC Baia Mare	10	(0)
1951–1964	Steaua București	257	(1)
1964–1965	ASA Târgu Mureş	11	(0)
Total		278	(1)

International career
	Romania U23	2	(0)
1951–1962	Romania	20	(0)

Managerial career
- 1977–1981: Steaua București (assistant coach)
- * Club domestic league appearances and goals

Vasile Zavoda, born László Zavoda, known as Zavoda II or Tigrul Akbar (26 July 1929 – 14 July 2014), was a Romanian football player and manager. A defender, he played 20 matches for Romania between 1951 and 1962, including one at the 1952 Olympics. Domestically he competed through 1964 in the Divizia A, accumulating 257 games. After retiring from competition he worked as an assistant coach for Steaua București in 1977–81.

== Overview ==
Zavoda played for Metalul Baia Mare between 1947 and 1951, before joining Steaua București. In 1964, aged 35, Zavoda played his last season, for ASA Târgu Mureş. Zavoda played 257 games in Romania's Divizia A and scored two goals. He also won 20 caps for Romania, the first in 1951 against Czechoslovakia, the last one in 1962 against East Germany. He played for Romania at the 1952 Summer Olympics.

He was the younger brother of Francisc Zavoda. Until his death he lived in Bucharest, in the same block of flats with his great friend and former teammate Ion Voinescu. The couple met every day to discuss football and Steaua București.

== Honours ==
Steaua București

- Romanian League (6): 1951, 1952, 1953, 1956, 1959–60, 1960–61
- Romanian Cup: 1951, 1952, 1955, 1961–62
