= 1960–61 Divizia A =

43rd season of top-tier football league in Romania

Divizia A
- Season: 1960–61
- Champions: CCA București
- Top goalscorer: Gheorghe Constantin (22)

The 1960–61 Divizia A season was the 43rd edition of the Romanian football championship and the 23rd since the introduction of the divisional system. After six seasons, Divizia A returned to a 14-team format. The season began on 4 September 1960 and concluded on 9 July 1961. CCA București won the championship for the sixth time in its history.

== Teams ==
A total of fourteen teams teams contested the championship, including eleven from the previous season and three newly promoted sides.

=== Team changes ===
Promoted from Divizia B

- CSMS Iași – debut.
- Știința Timișoara – returned after a one-year absence.
- Corvinul Hunedoara – returned after a five-year absence.

Relegated to Divizia B

- Jiul Petroșani – ended a thirteen-year stay.

=== Managers and locations ===
Location of teams in 1960-61 Divizia A

Club	City	Stadium	Capacity	Head coach
CCA București	București	Republicii (Note: CCA, Dinamo, Rapid, and Progresul also played several home matches in double-headers at the 23 August Stadium in Bucharest.)	28.000	Ștefan Onisie
Corvinul Hunedoara	Hunedoara	Corvinul	16.500	Ilie Savu
CSMS Iași	Iași	23 August	12.500	Ion Unguroiu
Dinamo Bacău	Bacău	Steaua Roșie	5.000	Gheorghe Nicolae
Dinamo București	București	Dinamo	18.000	Traian Ionescu
Farul Constanța	Constanța	1 Mai	15.520	Augustin Botescu
Minerul Lupeni	Lupeni	Minerul	5.000	Ion Bălănescu
Petrolul Ploiești	Ploiești	Petrolul	14.000	Ilie Oană
Progresul București	București	Progresul	8.000	Ioan Lupaș
Rapid București	București	Giulești	18.000	Ion Mihăilescu
Steagul Roșu Brașov	Brașov	Tineretului	8.800	Silviu Ploeșteanu
Știința Cluj	Cluj	Orășenesc	28.000	Andrei Sepci
Știința Timișoara	Timișoara	Știința	3.000	Nicolae Reuter
UTA Arad	Arad	30 Decembrie	20.000	Ion Reinhardt

=== Managerial changes ===
==== Pre-season ====
Team	Outgoing manager	Replaced by
CCA București	(Romania) Gheorghe Popescu	(Romania) Ștefan Onisie
Progresul București	(Romania) Augustin Botescu	(Romania) Ioan Lupaș
Rapid București	(Romania) Remus Ghiurițan	(Romania) Ion Mihăilescu
Știința Timișoara	(Romania) Silviu Bindea	(Romania) Eugen Mladin
UTA Arad	(Romania) Coloman Braun-Bogdan	(Romania) Ion Reinhardt

==== During the season ====
Team	Outgoing manager	Position in table		Replaced by
Team	Outgoing manager	Round	Position	Replaced by
Farul Constanța	(Romania) Iosif Lengheriu	9th	12th	(Romania) Augustin Botescu
Minerul Lupeni	(Romania) Vasile Lazăr	9th	9th	(Romania) Ion Bălănescu
Știința Timișoara	(Romania) Eugen Mladin	13th	13th	(Romania) Nicolae Reuter

== League table ==
Pos	Team	Pld	W	D	L	GF	GA	GD	Pts	Qualification or relegation
1	CCA București (C)	26	17	3	6	61	36	+25	37	Qualification to European Cup preliminary round
2	Dinamo București	26	14	4	8	56	31	+25	32	Invitation to Balkans Cup
3	Rapid București	26	11	8	7	37	31	+6	30	
4	Știința Cluj	26	12	5	9	48	44	+4	29	
5	Steagul Roşu Brașov	26	12	4	10	50	40	+10	28	Invitation to Balkans Cup
6	Petrolul Ploiești	26	10	8	8	45	45	0	28	
7	UTA Arad	26	12	3	11	46	42	+4	27	
8	Dinamo Bacău	26	11	3	12	39	36	+3	25	
9	Progresul București	26	10	5	11	48	51	−3	25	Qualification to Cup Winners' Cup first round
10	Știința Timișoara	26	9	7	10	45	49	−4	25	
11	Minerul Lupeni	26	10	2	14	30	50	−20	22	
12	CSMS Iași (R)	26	7	6	13	43	49	−6	20	Relegation to Divizia B
13	Farul Constanța (R)	26	8	4	14	37	58	−21	20	Relegation to Divizia B
14	Corvinul Hunedoara (R)	26	5	6	15	28	51	−23	16	Relegation to Divizia B

Source: LT
Rules for classification: 1) points; 2) goal average; 3) number of goals scored
(C) Champions; (R) Relegated

=== Results ===
Home \ Away	CCA	IAȘ	COR	BAC	DIN	FAR	MIN	PET	PRO	RAP	SRB	UTA	ȘCJ	ȘTI
CCA București	—	3–2	7–1	2–0	3–2	2–2	0–2	3–0	0–2	0–1	5–3	2–0	2–2	1–0
CSMS Iași	0–1	—	2–1	1–2	2–2	4–1	3–0	2–1	1–2	1–1	2–1	1–2	2–0	1–2
Corvinul Hunedoara	2–3	1–1	—	0–1	1–1	0–1	1–0	1–1	1–1	1–2	2–0	4–1	2–0	3–0
Dinamo Bacău	0–1	2–3	3–1	—	2–3	4–1	4–0	1–1	1–0	1–0	1–1	2–0	4–0	3–2
Dinamo București	2–3	3–2	4–0	2–0	—	7–0	6–0	6–0	1–1	0–0	2–0	3–0	0–2	3–2
Farul Constanța	2–3	4–3	1–0	2–1	0–1	—	1–0	2–2	1–2	1–0	2–3	1–1	1–0	3–3
Minerul Lupeni	0–1	2–2	3–0	0–1	1–2	3–1	—	2–1	1–0	2–0	2–1	1–0	0–0	1–0
Petrolul Ploiești	2–1	1–1	1–1	3–1	3–0	1–0	2–1	—	5–3	1–2	3–1	5–3	4–0	3–1
Progresul București	2–6	3–1	4–2	3–1	1–2	1–0	4–2	1–1	—	3–4	3–1	1–4	2–2	6–0
Rapid București	3–2	3–3	3–1	3–1	2–1	5–1	3–0	0–0	0–0	—	1–0	2–2	0–1	0–0
Steagul Roşu Brașov	2–1	2–0	2–2	1–0	3–1	5–1	3–1	1–1	5–0	2–0	—	3–1	2–2	3–1
UTA Arad	1–2	3–0	2–0	2–1	1–0	0–3	1–2	2–1	4–0	4–1	3–0	—	3–1	1–1
Știința Cluj	1–5	3–1	2–0	4–2	0–1	3–2	7–2	6–1	2–1	3–1	1–3	3–2	—	0–0
Știința Timișoara	2–2	3–2	5–0	0–0	2–1	4–3	6–2	3–1	3–2	0–0	3–2	2–3	1–3	—

Source: LT (in Romanian)
Legend: Blue = home team win; Yellow = draw; Red = away team win.

== Top goalscorers ==
Rank	Player	Club	Goals
1	Gheorghe Constantin	CCA București	22
2	Mircea Dridea	Petrolul Ploiești	21
3	Nicolae Tătaru	CCA București	15
3	Gheorghe Ene	Dinamo București	15
5	Matei Gram	Dinamo Bacău	14
5	Aurel Unguroiu	CSMS Iași	14

== Champion squad ==
CCA București

Goalkeepers: Costică Toma (10 / 0); Ion Voinescu (19 / 0).
Defenders: Vasile Zavoda (25 / 0); Alexandru Apolzan (20 / 0); Gheorghe Staicu (12 / 0); Traian Ivănescu (21 / 0).
Midfielders: Vasile Mihăilescu (8 / 1); Emerich Jenei (17 / 0); Tiberiu Bone (23 / 0).
Forwards: Gheorghe Cacoveanu (23 / 3); Ion Crișan (16 / 3); Gheorghe Constantin (23 / 22); Ion Alecsandrescu (23 / 12); Gabriel Raksi (26 / 3); Nicolae Tătaru (26 / 15); Alexandru Lazăr (6 / 2); Alexandru Donciu (1 / 0).
(league appearances and goals listed in brackets)

Manager: Ștefan Onisie.

== See also ==
- 1960–61 Divizia B
- 1960–61 Regional Championship
- 1960–61 Cupa României
