= 1951 Divizia A =

34th season of top-tier football league in Romania

Divizia A
- Season: 1951
- Champions: CCA București
- Top goalscorer: Gheorghe Váczi (23)

The 1951 Divizia A was the thirty-fourth season of Divizia A, the top-level football league of Romania.

== Teams ==
Location of teams in 1951 Divizia A

== League table ==
Pos	Team	Pld	W	D	L	GF	GA	GD	Pts	Qualification or relegation
1	CCA București (C)	22	13	6	3	43	19	+24	32	Champions of Romania
2	Dinamo București	22	14	4	4	52	29	+23	32	
3	Progresul Oradea	22	11	4	7	46	36	+10	26	
4	Flamura Roșie Arad	22	8	8	6	37	31	+6	24	
5	Flacăra București	22	8	6	8	36	40	−4	22	
6	Știința Cluj	22	8	5	9	32	36	−4	21	
7	Flacăra Petroșani	22	6	8	8	23	24	−1	20	
8	Locomotiva Timișoara	22	6	8	8	28	37	−9	20	
9	Dinamo Orașul Stalin	22	6	7	9	27	37	−10	19	
10	Locomotiva Târgu Mureş	22	7	2	13	26	36	−10	16	
11	Locomotiva București (R)	22	4	8	10	24	35	−11	16	Relegation to Divizia B
12	Știința Timișoara (R)	22	5	6	11	20	34	−14	16	Relegation to Divizia B

Source: LT
Rules for classification: 1) points; 2) goal average; 3) number of goals scored
(C) Champions; (R) Relegated

=== Results ===
Home \ Away	CCA	DIN	DOS	FPT	FLA	FRA	LBU	LTI	TÂR	ORA	ȘCJ	ȘTI
CCA București	—	2–1	3–0	0–0	0–0	2–0	0–1	7–0	2–0	4–2	2–1	1–0
Dinamo București	6–2	—	5–2	4–0	1–0	1–3	5–1	1–0	3–1	1–2	3–3	4–1
Dinamo Orașul Stalin	1–1	0–1	—	1–1	3–2	2–2	1–1	1–0	3–2	2–2	1–2	0–2
Flacăra Petroșani	1–1	0–0	1–1	—	1–1	3–2	1–0	0–1	0–1	3–2	4–1	5–0
Flacăra București	0–6	2–4	2–1	2–1	—	4–1	0–2	3–3	4–0	2–1	4–2	2–1
Flamura Roșie Arad	0–1	2–2	3–0	2–0	0–0	—	2–2	2–2	3–0	4–5	2–2	2–2
Locomotiva București	1–2	2–3	2–3	0–0	0–0	0–0	—	2–3	1–3	2–0	1–1	0–0
Locomotiva Timișoara	1–1	0–0	1–0	0–1	1–1	0–1	2–2	—	4–2	2–4	1–3	0–0
Locomotiva Târgu Mureş	0–3	2–3	0–1	1–0	2–3	1–2	1–2	0–0	—	1–0	3–0	4–0
Progresul Oradea	1–1	3–0	0–0	1–0	3–2	2–0	5–1	5–4	1–1	—	3–1	4–2
Știința Cluj	3–1	1–2	3–2	2–0	2–1	0–1	2–1	1–2	0–1	1–0	—	1–1
Știința Timișoara	0–1	0–2	1–2	1–1	5–1	0–3	1–0	0–1	1–0	2–0	0–0	—

Source: LT (in Romanian)
Legend: Blue = home team win; Yellow = draw; Red = away team win.

== Top goalscorers ==
Rank	Player	Club	Goals
1	Gheorghe Váczi	Progresul Oradea	23
2	Iuliu Farkaș	Flacăra Petroșani	13
3	Constantin Titi Popescu	Dinamo București / Flacăra București	11
4	Silviu Avram	Știința Cluj	10
4	Adalbert Kovács	Flamura Roșie Arad	10
4	Iosif Kovács	Locomotiva Timișoara	10
4	Ion Suru	Dinamo București	10

== Champion squad ==
CCA București

Goalkeepers: Ion Voinescu (22 / 0); Traian Ionescu (5 / 0).
Defenders: Vasile Zavoda (22 / 0); Alexandru Apolzan (22 / 0); Ștefan Rodeanu (20 / 0); Aurelian Cernea (3 / 0).
Midfielders: Ștefan Balint (22 / 0); Tiberiu Bone (22 / 1).
Forwards: Petre Moldoveanu (19 / 9); Nicolae Roman (14 / 5); Nicolae Drăgan (19 / 9); Francisc Zavoda (21 / 2); Petre Bădeanțu (22 / 9); Ion Alecsandrescu (2 / 1); Anton Fernbach-Ferenczi (12 / 2); Victor Moldovan (9 / 4).
(league appearances and goals listed in brackets)

Manager: Gheorghe Popescu I.

== See also ==
- 1951 Divizia B
- 1951 Regional Championship
- 1951 Cupa României
