= Gheorghe Constantin =

Romanian footballer (1932–2010)

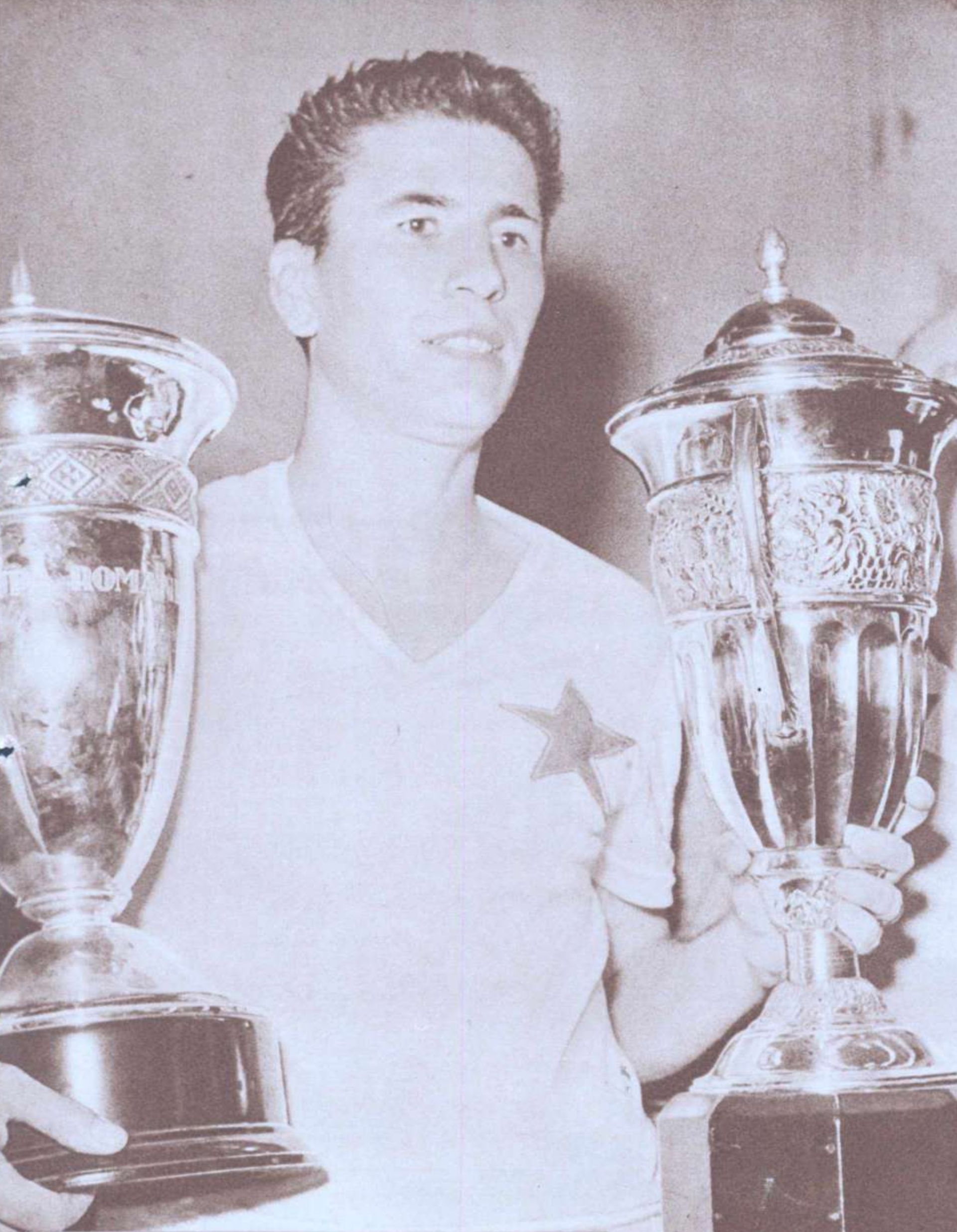
- Gheorghe Constantin in 1967

Personal information
- Date of birth: 14 December 1932
- Place of birth: Bucharest, Romania
- Date of death: 9 March 2010 (aged 77)
- Place of death: Bucharest, Romania
- Height: 1.82 m (6 ft 0 in)
- Position: Striker

Youth career
- 1946–1949: Unirea Tricolor București

Senior career*
Years	Team	Apps	(Gls)
1949–1950	Venus București		
1950–1951	Avântul Reghin		
1951–1954	CFR Iaşi		
1954–1955	CFR Sighetu Marmației		
1955–1969	Steaua București	264	(148)
1969–1970	Kayserispor	26	(5)
1970–1971	Farul Constanța	3	(0)
Total		293	(153)

International career
1956–1967	Romania (Note: Including 19 appearances and 6 goals for Romania's Olympic team.)	39	(12)

Managerial career
- 1971–1972: Steaua București (assistant)
- 1972–1973: Steaua București
- 1973–1975: Steaua București (assistant)
- 1975–1976: SC Bacău
- 1976: Fenerbahçe (assistant)
- 1976–1977: Romania (assistant)
- 1977–1978: FCM Galaţi
- 1978–1981: Steaua București
- 1981–1982: Politehnica Iaşi
- 1982–1984: Steaua Mecanică Fină
- 1984–1986: Gloria Buzău
- 1986–1987: Olt Scornicești
- 1987–1988: Universitatea Craiova
- 1989–1990: Farul Constanța
- 1990: Romania
- 1990–1991: Zeytinburnuspor
- 1991–1992: Rapid București
- 1993–1994: Farul Constanța (assistant)
- 1994: Farul Constanța
- * Club domestic league appearances and goals

Gheorghe Constantin (14 December 1932 – 9 March 2010) was a Romanian football player and coach, nicknamed 'The Professor' and a symbol of Steaua București.

== Playing career ==
Constantin began his career with Unirea Tricolor's youth team, and shortly after their dissolution, he signed with Venus București. He played for only one year at his new club before moving to Avântul Reghin, then CFR Iaşi, before finally signing a contract with Steaua București. He played for Steaua for 15 years and helped the club win 8 domestic titles. In 1969, the Romanian Communist authorities allowed him to play abroad for Kayserispor in Turkey at age 37.

Constantin made his debut for the Romania national team on 22 April 1956 in a 1–0 win against Yugoslavia in Belgrade, a game notable for the fact that the entire Romanian team consisted of players from Steaua București. He was also a member of Romania's team at the 1964 Summer Olympics in Japan.

== Managerial career ==
After his return from Turkey, he was appointed by Steaua București as assistant manager. Constantin was the manager of the club in 1972, but after only a short period, he moved to Bacău. After Bacău, he managed FCM Galaţi, but returned to Steaua in 1978. He won the Romanian Cup in his second spell there, then left the club to manage Politehnica Iaşi. In 1983, he was appointed the manager of Steaua București's second team, Steaua Mecanică Fină București. He managed a number of clubs in his native country and also coached in Turkey.

== Death ==
He died in Bucharest on 9 March 2010, at the age of 77.

== Playing statistics ==
Scores and results list Romania's goal tally first, score column indicates score after each Constantin goal.

List of international goals scored by Gheorghe Constantin
No.	Date	Venue	Opponent	Score	Result	Competition
1	14 September 1958	Zentral Stadium, Leipzig, East Germany	East Germany	1–1	2–3	Friendly
2	2 November 1958	23 August Stadium, Bucharest, Romania	Turkey	2–0	3–0	1960 European Nations' Cup qualification
3	8 November 1959	23 August Stadium, Bucharest, Romania	Bulgaria	1–0	1–0	1960 European Nations' Cup qualification
4	8 October 1961	23 August Stadium, Bucharest, Romania	Turkey	3–0	4–0	Friendly
5	8 October 1961	23 August Stadium, Bucharest, Romania	Turkey	4–0	4–0	Friendly
6	25 November 1962	23 August Stadium, Bucharest, Romania	Spain	3–1	3–1	1964 European Nations' Cup qualifying
7	23 December 1962	Stade D'honneur, Casablanca, Morocco	Morocco	1–0	1–3	Friendly
8	23 June 1963	Idrætsparken Stadium, Copenhagen, Denmark	Denmark	1–0	3–2	1964 Summer Olympics qualification
9	27 April 1964	23 August Stadium, Bucharest, Romania	Czechoslovakia	1–0	4–1	Friendly
10	3 May 1964	23 August Stadium, Bucharest, Romania	Austria	1–0	2–1	Friendly
11	3 May 1964	23 August Stadium, Bucharest, Romania	Austria	2–0	2–1	Friendly
12	22 October 1964	Nagai Stadium, Osaka, Japan	Yugoslavia	3–0	3–0	1964 Summer Olympics (5th place match)

== Honours ==
=== Player ===
Steaua Bucharest

- Romanian League: 1956, 1960, 1961, 1968
- Romanian Cup: 1955, 1962, 1966, 1967

Individual

- Romanian League top scorer: 1960, 1961, 1962

=== Manager ===
Steaua Bucharest

- Romanian Cup: 1978–79
- Romanian League runner-up: 1979–80

Politehnica Iaşi

- Romanian Second League: 1981–82
