= Titus Ozon =

Romanian footballer

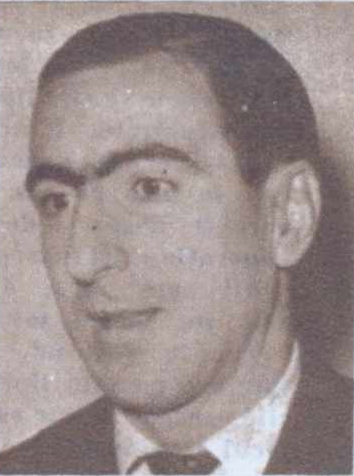

Personal information
- Date of birth: 13 May 1927
- Place of birth: Bucharest, Romania
- Date of death: 24 November 1996 (aged 69)
- Place of death: Bucharest, Romania
- Height: 1.70 m (5 ft 7 in)
- Position: Striker

Youth career
- 1937–1947: Unirea Tricolor București

Senior career*
Years	Team	Apps	(Gls)
1947–1948	Unirea Tricolor București (Note: The 1940–41 Divizia A was the last season before World War II and the 1946–47 Divizia A was the first one after, so the appearances and goals scored during this period for Unirea Tricolor București are not official, also the statistics for the 1946–47 Divizia B season are unavailable with the exception of the 1945–46 regional championship.)	33	(26)
1948–1954	Dinamo București	94	(55)
1951	→ Dinamo Brașov (loan)	17	(8)
1955–1958	Progresul București (Note: The 1957 championship called Cupa Primăverii is unofficial, so the appearances and goals scored at that competition for Progresul București are not official.)	58	(41)
1958–1964	Rapid București	79	(33)
Total		281	(163)

International career
1952–1962	Romania	22	(7)

Managerial career
- 1964–1966: Progresul București
- 1968–1970: Jiul Petroșani
- 1970–1971: Argeș Pitești
- 1972–1974: Libya
- 1974–1975: Jiul Petroșani
- 1975–1976: FC Brăila
- 1976–1977: Pandurii Târgu Jiu
- 1977–1978: Azotul Slobozia
- 1978–1979: Șoimii Sibiu
- * Club domestic league appearances and goals

Titus Ozon (13 May 1927 – 24 November 1996) was a Romanian international football striker and manager. He was considered one of the greatest talents in postwar Romanian football, being known for his dribbling abilities.

== Club career ==
Ozon, nicknamed "Nas" (Nose), was born on 13 May 1927 in the Obor neighborhood of Bucharest, Romania. He began playing football at the age of 10 under the guidance of coach Ștefan Cârjan at Unirea Tricolor București. Ozon started his senior career at Unirea Tricolor, helping the side gain promotion to the first league at the end of the 1946–47 Divizia B season. Subsequently, he made his Divizia A debut on 26 October 1947 in a 4–0 away loss to Oțelul Reșița. He scored a personal record of 21 goals until the end of the 1947–48 season.

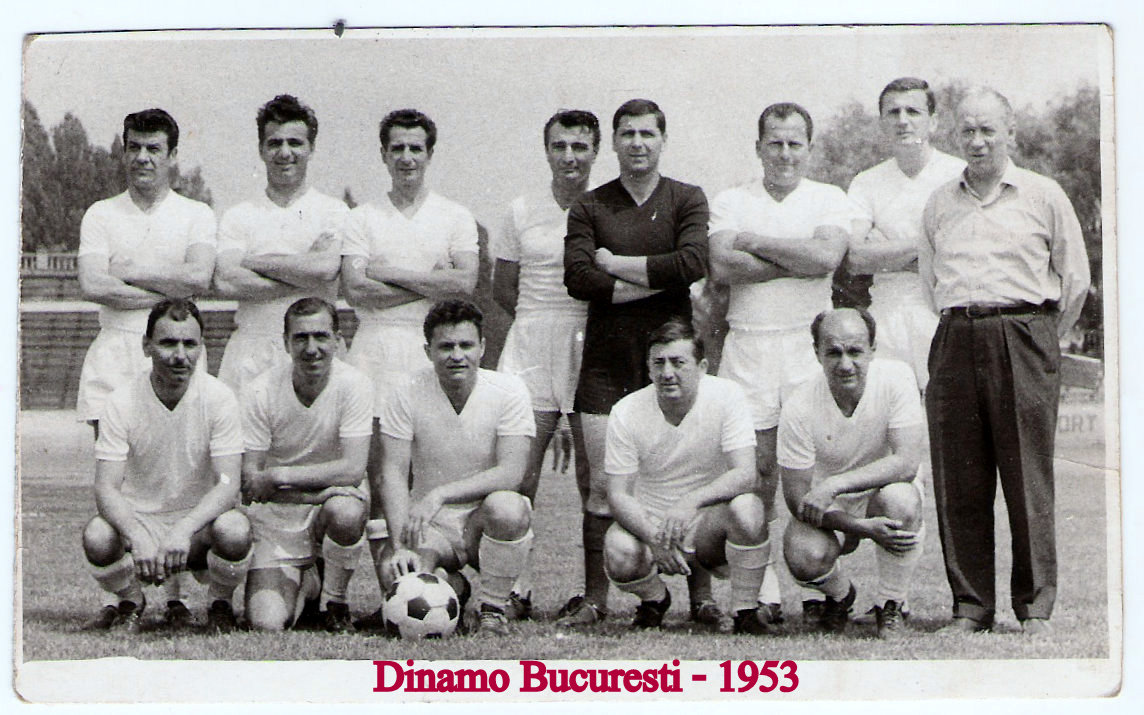
Ozon (front row, second from the left) with Dinamo București in 1953.

In 1948, Unirea Tricolor merged with Carmen București to create Dinamo, Ozon playing until 1954 for the new club, with the exception of the 1951 season spent at Dinamo Brașov. He earned the Divizia A top-scorer title for two consecutive seasons, in 1952 with 17 goals and in 1953 with 12 goals, and the team finished runner-up in these seasons. Dinamo reached the 1954 Cupa României final, coach Angelo Niculescu using him as a starter until halftime when he replaced him with Valeriu Neagu in the 2–0 loss to Metalul Reșița. Ozon also netted two goals in two victories against rivals CCA București.

In 1955 he joined Progresul București. With them, Ozon reached the 1958 Cupa României final where coaches Ioan Lupaș and Cornel Drăgușin used him the entire match in the 1–0 loss to Știința Timișoara. Subsequently, he switched teams again, going to Rapid București. He reached two Cupa României finals in 1961 and 1962 under the guidance of coach Ion Mihăilescu which were lost to Arieșul Turda and Steaua București respectively, scoring a goal against the latter. Ozon made his last Divizia A appearance on 15 March 1964 in Rapid's 1–0 victory against Crișul Oradea, the team finishing the season in second place. He has a total of 270 matches with 158 goals in the Romanian top-league.

== International career ==
Ozon played 22 games and scored seven goals for Romania. He made his debut on 11 May 1952 when coach Emerich Vogl sent him in the 73rd minute to replace Gheorghe Bodo in a 3–1 friendly victory against Czechoslovakia in which he scored once. He was selected by coach Gheorghe Popescu to be part of Romania's 1952 Summer Olympics squad where he played in the 2–1 loss to eventual champions Hungary. Ozon also played one match in the 1954 World Cup qualifiers and two games in which he scored the victory goal in a 2–1 win over Greece during the 1958 World Cup qualifiers. He made his last appearance for The Tricolours, when he captained them in a 6–0 loss to Spain in the 1964 European Nations' Cup qualifiers.

=== International goals ===
Scores and results list Romania's goal tally first, score column indicates score after each Ozon goal.

Goal	Date	Venue	Opponent	Score	Result	Competition
1	11 May 1952	Stadionul Republicii, București, Romania	Czechoslovakia	3–1	3–1	Friendly
2	8 May 1954	Walter-Ulbricht-Stadion, Berlin, East Germany	East Germany	1–0	1–0	Friendly
3	19 September 1954	Népstadion, Budapest, Hungary	Hungary	1–1	1–5	Friendly
4	29 May 1955	23 August Stadium, București, Romania	Poland	1–0	2–2	Friendly
5	12 June 1955	Ullevaal Stadion, Oslo, Norway	Norway	1–0	1–0	Friendly
6	16 June 1957	Leoforos Alexandras Stadium, Athens, Greece	Greece	2–1	2–1	1958 World Cup qualifiers
7	30 September 1962	23 August Stadium, București, Romania	Morocco	2–0	4–0	Friendly

== Managerial career ==
Ozon started his coaching career in 1964 at Divizia A club Progresul București, and the team was relegated at the end of his first season. In 1968 he was appointed coach at Jiul Petroșani, leading them in the first league for two seasons. In 1970 he went to work for Argeș Pitești. After the 4–1 loss to FCM Bacău in the first round of the 1971–72 season, Ozon left Argeș, with Florin Halagian replacing him, and the team then won the title.

In 1972, he was appointed head coach of Libya's national team, due to the good relations between presidents Nicolae Ceaușescu and Muammar Gaddafi. Two years later, Ozon returned for a second spell at Jiul, leading them in the 3–2 aggregate loss to Dundee United in the first round of the 1974–75 European Cup Winners' Cup. Afterwards he coached in the Romanian lower leagues for clubs such as FC Brăila, Pandurii Târgu Jiu, Azotul Slobozia and Șoimii Sibiu. With Pandurii he earned a first-ever promotion from the third league to the second in the 1976–77 season.

== Acting career ==
In 1955, Ozon acted in the comedy film Și Ilie face sport (Ilie also does sport), directed by Andrei Călărașu, in which the lives and morals of the athletes and fans were the subject. He also performed as a theater artist, being the star of the 1957 satire show "Bujor 12", which was performed at the "Constantin Tănase" theater in Bucharest.

== Writing ==
Ozon wrote an autobiographical volume titled Mereu în 16 metri (Always within 16 meters), which was published in 1972.

== Controversies ==
Ozon was part of a Divizia A selection of players that played two away matches in 1952 against CSKA and Dynamo Moscow. They received Pobeda brand watches, which they threw away, considering them "unsightly", a gesture for which the Soviets got upset. In 1953, during a match against Dinamo Tbilisi played in Bucharest, Ozon managed a pass between the legs of Georgian star Avtandil Gogoberidze. After this game he was named an "enemy of the people" by the communist regime, which accused him of mocking the Soviets, being sanctioned with ten percent of his salary and arrested at the garrison for a day.

In 1955 he wanted to leave Dinamo București, because of the "army atmosphere there", and secretly signed with Progresul București. However, the generals of the Ministry of Internal Affairs were bothered by this, and tried to prevent him from submitting a report to the Romanian Football Federation by accusing him of having legionnaire sympathies, because he played for Unirea Tricolor. According to an interview given by Ozon in 1995, he was deported to the Delta to cut reeds, where he was detained in a cabin, guarded by security. He managed to escape and arrived at the federation headquarters, hidden in a car to report his experience. The coach from Progresul, Cornel Drăgușin, considered him a "conflicting, independent and brilliant player on the field".

In 1958, after returning to the country from a tournament with Progresul in Albania, he was caught by customs with about 3,000 ivory buttons for which he was charged with smuggling and suspended from sports. After six months, according to the writer George Mihalache, Titus Ozon met with Gheorghe Gheorghiu-Dej on Calea Victoriei and asked for his suspension to be lifted. Gheorghiu-Dej agreed with the condition that Ozon would play for the team that he liked, Rapid.

== Death ==
Ozon died on 24 November 1996 at age 69.

A park in Sector 2 of Bucharest is named after him and has a statue of Ozon displayed within it.

== Honours ==
=== Player ===
Unirea Tricolor București

- Divizia B: 1946–47

Dinamo București

- Divizia A runner-up: 1952, 1953
- Cupa României runner-up: 1954

Progresul București

- Cupa României runner-up: 1957–58

Rapid București

- Divizia A runner-up: 1963–64
- Cupa României runner-up: 1960–61, 1961–62

=== Individual ===
- Divizia A top-scorer: 1952, 1953

=== Manager ===
Argeș Pitești

- Divizia A: 1971–72

Pandurii Târgu Jiu

- Divizia C: 1976–77
