= Francisc Zavoda =

Romanian footballer

Personal information
- Date of birth: 14 April 1927
- Place of birth: Rodna Veche, Bistriţa, Romania
- Date of death: July 2011 (aged 84)
- Position: Striker

Youth career
- 1938–1947: Phoenix Baia Mare

Senior career*
Years	Team	Apps	(Gls)
1947–1948	Phoenix Baia Mare		
1948–1949	CFR București	26	(6)
1950–1960	Steaua București	174	(33)
1960–1961	Academia Militară București		
Total		200	(39)

International career
1951–1959	Romania	8	(0)

Managerial career
- 1964–1965: Steaua București (assistant)
- 1979–1980: ASA Târgu Mureş (assistant)
- 1983: Progresul Brăila
- * Club domestic league appearances and goals

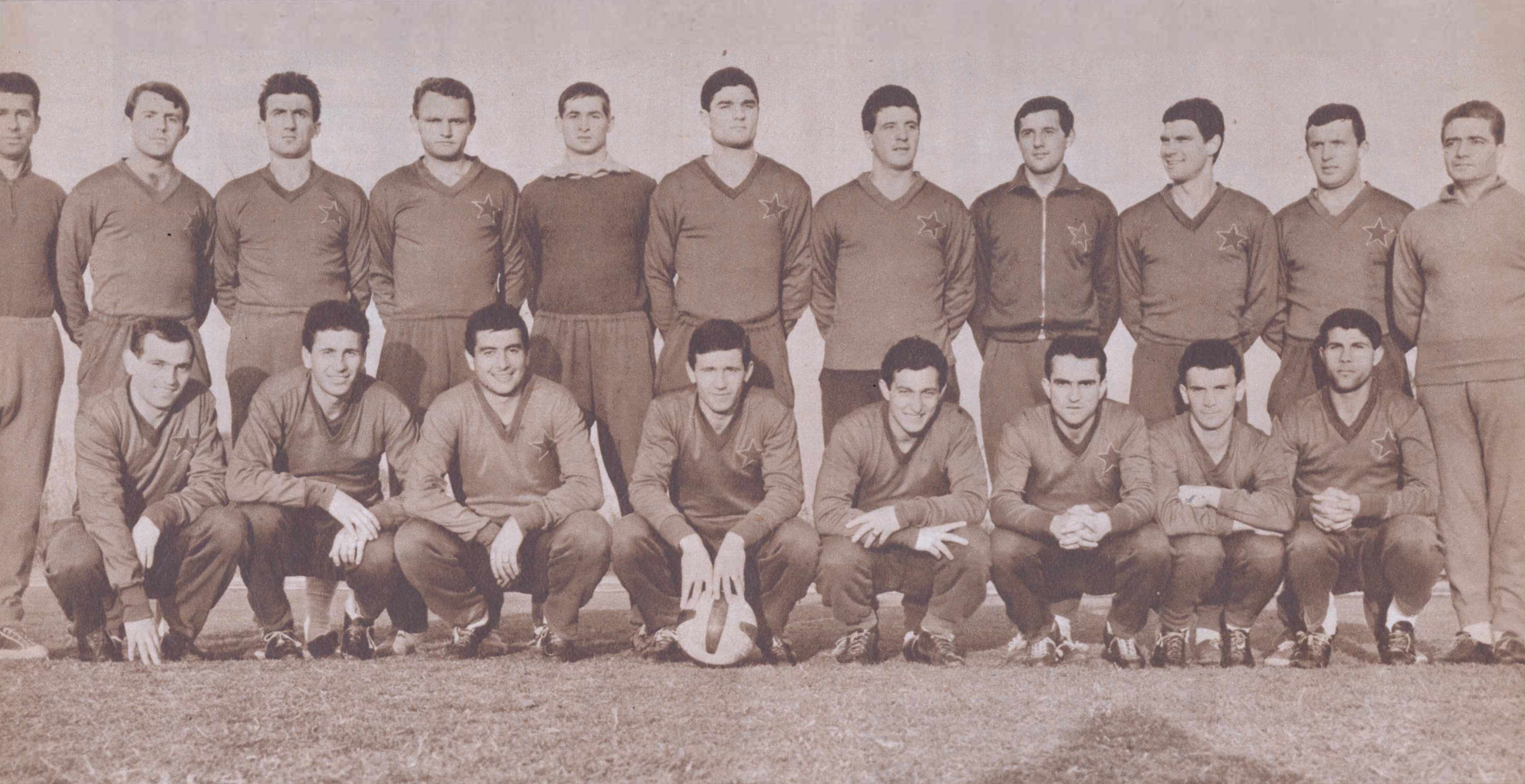

Francisc Zavoda (14 April 1927 – July 2011), also known as Zavoda I, was a Romanian footballer. He was the older brother of Vasile Zavoda who was also an International footballer and they played together at Steaua București.

== Career as football player ==
Zavoda played as striker for Phoenix Baia Mare (1947–1948), CFR București (1948–1949) and then Steaua București (1950–1960). He played a total of 200 games in Divizia A and scored 43 goals. He was champion of Romania in five occasions and won four Romanian Cups. He won eight caps for Romania. He was also part of Romania's squad at the 1952 Summer Olympics, but he did not play in any matches.

== Career as coach ==
Zavoda was assistant coach at Steaua București (1964–1966) and ASA Târgu Mureş (1979–1980) and head coach at Progresul Brăila (1983).

== Honours ==
=== Club ===
Steaua București

- Romanian League (5): 1951, 1952, 1953, 1956, 1959–60
- Romanian Cup (4): 1950, 1951, 1952, 1955
