= Victor Dumitrescu =

Romanian footballer (1924-1997)

Personal information
- Full name: Victor Dumitrescu
- Date of birth: 25 September 1924
- Place of birth: Orăştie, Romania
- Date of death: 15 March 1997 (aged 72)
- Position: Defender

Senior career*
Years	Team	Apps	(Gls)
1934–1944	Corvinul Deva		
1946–1948	Surianul Sebeş Alba		
1948–1951	Flacăra Mediaş		
1951–1959	Steaua București	102	(0)
Total		102	(0)

Managerial career
- 1963–1964: Steaua București (assistant coach)
- 1973–1974: Steaua București (assistant coach)
- * Club domestic league appearances and goals

Victor Dumitrescu (25 September 1924 – 15 March 1997) was a Romanian footballer who played as left back. Dumitrescu began his football career at the age of 10, in the neighbour city of Deva. He played ten years for Corvinul Deva, beginning as a youth and finishing as a senior. In 1946, he moved to Sebeş, playing well for Surianul, and after two years he signed with Flacăra Mediaş. After three years in Mediaş, Dumitrescu joined Steaua București. He played eight years for his side, being a part of Steaua's Golden Team of the 1950s. He is the single player of the Golden Team who had never played for Romania national football team.

== Honours ==
=== Club ===
Steaua București

- Liga I (3): 1952, 1953, 1956
- Cupa României (2): 1952, 1955
