= Gheorghe Popescu (footballer, born 1919) =

Romanian footballer and manager

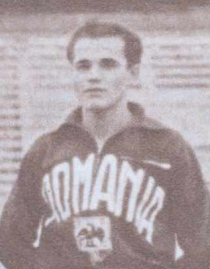
- Popescu in 1940

Personal information
- Date of birth: 8 August 1919
- Place of birth: Bucharest, Romania
- Date of death: 1 January 2001 (aged 81)
- Place of death: Bucharest, Romania
- Position: Striker

Youth career
- 1928–1935: Gloria București

Senior career*
Years	Team	Apps	(Gls)
1935–1946	Sportul Studențesc București (Note: The Divizia A 1940–41 was the last season before World War II and the Divizia A 1946–47 was the first one after, so the appearances and goals scored during this period for Sportul Studențesc București are not official with the exception of the 1945–46 regional championship, also the statistics for the 1935–36 and 1936–37 Divizia B seasons are unavailable.)	93	(54)
1946–1947	Carmen București	17	(4)
1947–1949	CSCA București	37	(16)
Total		147	(74)

International career
1937–1943	Romania	6	(1)

Managerial career
- 1951–1953: CCA București
- 1952–1953: Romania
- 1955–1957: Romania
- 1958–1960: CCA București
- 1961: Romania
- 1962: Steaua București
- 1962: Romania
- * Club domestic league appearances and goals

Gheorghe Popescu (8 August 1919 – 1 January 2001) was a Romanian footballer and also a manager. He played as a striker.

== Club career ==
Popescu was born on 8 August 1919 in Bucharest, Romania and began playing junior-level football in 1928 at Gloria. He started his senior career in 1935 at Divizia B club Sportul Studențesc București where he worked with coach Coloman Braun-Bogdan, helping them earn promotion to the first league at the end of the 1936–37 season. He made his Divizia A debut on 12 September 1937 in Sportul's 3–0 away loss to Gloria Arad. The highlight of his period spent with The Students was reaching the 1939 Cupa României final in which he played the entire match in the 2–0 loss to Rapid București. Subsequently, they earned a third place in the league at the end of the 1939–40 season in which he scored a personal record of 14 goals. In 1946, Popescu joined Carmen București, helping the team to a runner-up place in his single season at the club. Afterwards, he reunited with his former coach from Sportul Studențesc, Braun-Bogdan, at newly founded club CSCA București. He was the club's first ever captain and the team's top-scorer with 10 goals at the end of his first season. In the following season he played the full 90 minutes under coach Ferenc Rónay in the 2–1 victory against CSU Cluj in the 1949 Cupa României final, which helped the club win its first trophy. In the same season, Popescu made his last Divizia A appearance on 21 November 1948 in the first ever CSCA – Dinamo derby which ended with a 1–0 loss, totaling 135 games with 64 goals in the competition. Throughout his career, Popescu's style of play was often praised in the press by the famous Romanian poet Camil Petrescu.

== International career ==
Popescu played six friendly games for Romania, making his debut at age 17 on 10 June 1937 under coach Constantin Rădulescu in a 2–1 home victory against Belgium. His following game was supposed to be against Sweden, but he refused to participate because he wanted to study in order to earn his Baccalaureate degree. He scored his only goal for The Tricolours in a 2–1 away victory against Yugoslavia. Popescu's last appearance for the national team took place on 13 June 1943 in a 2–2 draw against Slovakia.

=== International goals ===
Scores and results list Romania's goal tally first. "Score" column indicates the score after each Gheorghe Popescu goal.

#	Date	Venue	Opponent	Score	Result	Competition
1.	22 September 1940	Stadion Beogradski S.K., Belgrade, Yugoslavia	Yugoslavia	1–1	2–1	Friendly

== Managerial career ==
=== CCA/Steaua București ===
Popescu started his coaching career in 1951 at the team where he had ended his playing career, which at this time was named CCA București. He helped the club win The Double in his first year spent at the club, being aged 32. In the following season, the team repeated the performance, winning another Double. He started the 1953 season at CCA, leading the club in the first half before Ferenc Rónay replaced him, with the team ultimately winning the championship.

He returned for a second tenure at CCA in 1958, winning the 1960 title. In 1962, Popescu had his third and final spell at the team which now was named Steaua, helping it win the Cupa României after a 5–1 victory over Rapid București in the final.

=== Romania's national team ===
Popescu had his first spell at Romania's national team in 1952, his debut taking place on 25 May when he led them in a 1–0 friendly victory against Poland. His following game was in the 1952 Summer Olympics where they were eliminated after the first match, a 2–1 loss to eventual champions Hungary. Afterwards, he led Romania in three games during the 1954 World Cup qualifiers, managing two wins over Bulgaria and an away loss to Czechoslovakia.

Popescu's second stint at the national team started in 1955. He guided them in the 1958 World Cup qualifiers, winning both games against Greece, and obtained a draw and a loss against Yugoslavia, finishing the group in second place, behind Yugoslavia who qualified to the final tournament. In his third tenure from 1961 he led the team in two friendly wins over Turkey. Subsequently, in his fourth and final spell he led Romania in a 3–1 win over Spain in the 1964 European Nations' Cup qualifiers. Across all four of his spells combined at the national team, Popescu gained a total of 25 games, consisting of 13 victories, four draws and eight losses.

== Executive career ==
After retiring as manager, he was the President of the Romanian Football Federation from 1963 until 1967. Afterwards, between 1967 and 1973, Popescu worked as vice-president at Steaua București, a period in which the team won one league title and three cups, and also from 1983 until 1984 he was a counselor at the same club.

== Death ==
Popescu died on 1 January 2001 at age 81.

== Honours ==
=== Player ===
Sportul Studențesc București

- Cupa României runner-up: 1938–39

Carmen București

- Divizia A runner-up: 1946–47

CSCA București

- Cupa României: 1948–49

=== Manager ===
Steaua București

- Divizia A: 1951, 1952, 1953, 1960
- Cupa României: 1951, 1952, 1962

== Notes ==
Sporting positions
Preceded by —	Steaua captain 1947–1949	Succeeded by Alexandru Apolzan
Preceded by —	Steaua Top Scorer; 1947–1948	Succeeded by Petre Moldoveanu
