= 1951 Cupa României =

Tournament details
- Country: Romania

Final positions
- Champions: CCA București
- Runners-up: Flacăra Mediaş

The 1951 Cupa României is the 14th edition of Romania's most prestigious football cup competition.

The title was won by CCA București against Flacăra Mediaş.

== Format ==
The competition is an annual knockout tournament.

In the first round proper, two pots were made, first pot with Divizia A teams and other teams till 16 and the second pot with the rest of teams qualified in this phase. First pot teams will play away. Each tie is played as a single leg.

If a match is drawn after 90 minutes, the game goes in extra time, and if the scored is still tight after 120 minutes, the team who plays away will qualify.

In case the teams are from same city, there a replay will be played.

In case the teams play in the final, there a replay will be played.

From the first edition, the teams from Divizia A entered in competition in sixteen finals, rule which remained till today.

== First round proper ==
Team 1	Score	Team 2
27 June 1951
Locomotiva Arad (Div. B)	1–4	(Div. A) Flamura Roşie Arad
Metalul AMEF Arad (Div. C)	1–2	(Div. A) Locomotiva Timişoara
Flamura Roşie Buhuşi (Div. C)	1–0	(Div. B) Locomotiva Iaşi
Locomotiva Cluj (Div. B)	0–3	(Div. A) Dinamo Oraşul Stalin
Locomotiva PCA Constanţa (Div. C)	1–2	(Div. A) Dinamo București
CSA Craiova (Div. B)	1–0 (a.e.t.)	(Div. A) Flacăra Petroşani
Locomotiva Galaţi (Div. B)	0–9	(Div. A) CCA București
Spartac Giurgiu (Div. C)	0–7	(Div. A) Locomotiva București
Flacăra Mediaş (Div. B)	2–1	(Div. A) Ştiinţa Cluj
Flamura Roşie Piteşti (Div. B)	0–3	(Div. A) Flacăra București
Flacăra Poiana Câmpina (Div. C)	4–3 (a.e.t.)	(Div. B) Metalul București
Metalul Reșița (Div. B)	1–1 (a.e.t.)	(Div. A) Ştiinţa Timişoara
Locomotiva Satu Mare (Div. B)	0–2	(Div. A) Progresul Oradea
Flamura Roşie Sf. Gheorghe (Div. B)	2–0	(Div. A) Locomotiva Târgu Mureş
Metalul Tohan (Div. C)	0–2	(Div. B) Metalul Sibiu
Locomotiva Oradea (Div. B)	0–3 (forfait)	(Div. B) CSA Cluj

== Second round proper ==
Team 1	Score	Team 2
1 July 1951
Flamura Roşie Buhuşi	1–8	CCA București
CSA Cluj	2–1	Progresul Oradea
Flacăra Mediaş	3–1	Flamura Roşie Arad
Flacăra Poiana Câmpina	1–1 (a.e.t.)	Locomotiva București
Flamura Roşie Sf. Gheorghe	0–1	Dinamo Oraşul Stalin
Metalul Sibiu	6–2 (a.e.t.)	CSA Craiova
Ştiinţa Timişoara	4–0	Locomotiva Timişoara
4 July 1951
Flacăra București	3–2	Dinamo București

== Quarter-finals ==
Team 1	Score	Team 2
5 September 1951
CCA București	2–1	Metalul Sibiu
Locomotiva București	0–1	Flacăra Mediaş
Dinamo Oraşul Stalin	2–0	CSA Cluj
12 September 1951
Ştiinţa Timişoara	1–0	Flacăra București

== Semi-finals ==
Team 1	Score	Team 2
24 October 1951
Flacăra Mediaş	2–0	Dinamo Oraşul Stalin
1 November 1951
CCA București	3–1 (a.e.t.)	Ştiinţa Timişoara

== Final ==
8 November 1951
14:30 EET

CCA București	3–1 (a.e.t.)	Flacăra Mediaș
Drăgan 49', 111'; Moldoveanu 112'	Report	Coman 71'

Republicii, Bucharest
Attendance: 25,000
Referee: Gheorghe Ionescu (Orașul Stalin)
