= 1952 Cupa României =

Tournament details
- Country: Romania

Final positions
- Champions: CCA București
- Runners-up: Flacăra Ploieşti

The 1952 Cupa României was the 15th edition of Romania's most prestigious football cup competition.

The title was won by CCA București against Flacăra Ploieşti.

== Format ==
The competition is an annual knockout tournament.

In the first round proper, two pots were made, first pot with Divizia A teams and other teams till 16 and the second pot with the rest of teams qualified in this phase. First pot teams will play away. Each tie is played as a single leg.

If a match is drawn after 90 minutes, the game goes in extra time, and if the scored is still tight after 120 minutes, the team who plays away will qualify.

In case the teams are from same city, there a replay will be played.

In case the teams play in the final, there a replay will be played.

From the first edition, the teams from Divizia A entered in competition in sixteen finals, rule which remained till today.

== First round proper ==
Team 1	Score	Team 2
7 September 1952
CA Craiova (Div. B)	0–4	(Div. B) Locomotiva București
10 September 1952
Locomotiva Arad (Div. B)	2–1	(Div. A) Metalul Câmpia Turzii
Dinamo Bacău (Div. C)	3–1	(Div. B) Metalul București
Flacăra Poiana Câmpina (Div. B)	3–6	(Div. A) Progresul Oradea
Locomotiva Craiova (Div. C)	1–3 (a.e.t.)	(Div. B) Spartac București
Flacăra Mediaş (Div. B)	2–1 (a.e.t.)	(Div. A) Dinamo Oraşul Stalin
Flacăra Moreni (Div. B)	0–3	(Div. A) CA Câmpulung Moldovenesc
Locomotiva Oradea (Div. B)	3–1	(Div. A) Flamura Roşie Arad
Înainte Sibiu (Div. B)	3–3 (a.e.t.)	(Div. A) Dinamo București
11 September 1952
Flamura Roşie Bacău (Div. B)	0–2	(Div. A) Flacăra Ploieşti
CA Cluj (Div. C)	0–3	(Div. A) CCA București
Metalul Hunedoara (Div. C)	0–2	(Div. A) Flacăra Petroşani
Metalul Oradea (Div. B)	3–1	(Div. A) Locomotiva Târgu Mureş
Avântul Topliţa (Div. C)	3–2 (a.e.t.)	(Div. B) Metalul Oraşul Stalin
25 September 1952
Progresul Satu Mare (Div. B)	0–5	(Div. A) Ştiinţa Cluj
Locomotiva Timişoara (Div. A)	2–1 (a.e.t.)	(Div. B) Ştiinţa Timişoara

== Second round proper ==
Team 1	Score	Team 2
1 October 1952
Locomotiva Arad	0–1 (a.e.t.)	Progresul Oradea
Dinamo Bacău	2–6	CCA București
Locomotiva București	1–3	Flacăra Ploieşti
Spartac București	3–1	Flacăra Petroşani
Flacăra Mediaş	2–3	CA Câmpulung Moldovenesc
Metalul Oradea	2–4 (a.e.t.)	Locomotiva Timişoara
Avântul Topliţa	2–5	Dinamo București
2 October 1952
Locomotiva Oradea	2–1	Ştiinţa Cluj

== Quarter-finals ==
Team 1	Score	Team 2
15 October 1952
CCA București	2–1	Locomotiva Oradea
Dinamo București	3–0	CA Câmpulung Moldovenesc
Progresul Oradea	3–0	Locomotiva Timişoara
Flacăra Ploieşti	3–2	Spartac București

== Semi-finals ==
Team 1	Score	Team 2
3 December 1952
CCA București	3–2	Dinamo București
Flacăra Ploieşti	4–0	Progresul Oradea

== Final ==
7 December 1952
13:15 EET

CCA București	2–0	Flacăra Ploieşti
Moldovan 9'; Drăgan 56'	Report

Republicii, Bucharest
Attendance: 15,000
Referee: Andrei Bölöni (Oraşul Stalin)
