= List of international football players playing in Hungary =

This list contains the present and former international football players playing in Nemzeti Bajnokság, their nationality, the number of international games/matches in the league they played, the number of goals they scored on them, the duration between their first and last appearance in the league, and the teams they were playing for. (The list only contains those players whom appeared in the top division.)

The last time this article was refreshed: 2026. 10. 24.

- Players written in bold are still playing in the league.

== The list of players ==
Name	Nationality	No. of Int. Games	No. of Int. Goals.	No. of Dom. Matches	No. of Dom. Goals.	Period in the league	Clubs
Sulejman Demollari	(Albania)	45	1	5	1	1996	Győri ETO
Fouad Bouguerra	(Algeria)	2	0	32	13	2010-2011	Nyíregyháza Spartacus; Győri ETO
Karim Benounes	(Algeria)	1	0	20	6	2010	Vasas
Naçer Bouiche	(Algeria)	25	10	12	4	1991	Ferencváros
Evandro Brandão	(Angola)	1	0	14	1	2011-2012	Videoton
Yeghia Yavruyan	(Armenia)	4	0	75	15	1999, 2002-2004	Dunaújváros; Sopron; Békéscsaba
**David Williams**	(Australia)	2	0	43	16	2016-	Szombathelyi Haladás
Ignaz Ludwig	(Austria)	3	0	1	0	1928	Szegedi AK
Heinrich Müller	(Austria)	5	4	122	64	1935-1940	MTK
Rezső Herquett	(Austria)	1	0			1903-1904	MTK
Marco Djuricin	(Austria)	2	0	25	8	2016-2017	Ferencváros
Otto Höss	(Austria)	6	2	24	11	1927-1928	Szegedi AK
Richard Niederbacher	(Austria)	4	0	22	10	1994-1995	Pécsi MFC
Rolf Landerl	(Austria)	1	0	10	2	2005	Sopron
Rudolf Wagner	(Austria)	1	0	10	2	1901-1902	BTC; Ferencváros
Aleh Karol	(Belarus)	2	0	84	2	1997-1999	Ferencváros; Stadler; Gázszer
Mikhail Markhel	(Belarus)	3	0	3	0	1992	Nyíregyháza Spartacus
Roland Lamah	(Belgium)	5	0	54	12	2014-2016	Ferencváros
Sidoine Oussou	(Benin)	3	0	2	1	2013	Kecskemét
Vicente Arze	(Bolivia)	3	0	22	1	2011-2012	Diósgyőr
**Anel Hadžić**	(Bosnia and Herzegovina)	13	0	26	5	2016-	Videoton
**Đorđe Kamber**	(Bosnia and Herzegovina)	1	0	245	38	2008-	Diósgyőr; Zalaegerszeg; Győri ETO; Budapest Honvéd
Eldin Adilović	(Bosnia and Herzegovina)	2	0	5	0	2010	Győri ETO
Emir Granov	(Bosnia and Herzegovina)	4	0	6	1	2000	Újpest
Emir Hadžić	(Bosnia and Herzegovina)	2	0	7	0	2012	Budapest Honvéd
Haris Handžić	(Bosnia and Herzegovina)	2	0	12	2	2017	Debrecen
Jusuf Dajić	(Bosnia and Herzegovina)	1	0	105	23	2006-2013	Videoton; Vasas; Siófok
Mario Božić	(Bosnia and Herzegovina)	2	0	126	15	2004-2009	Videoton; Újpest
Miroslav Stevanović	(Bosnia and Herzegovina)	12	1	3	0	2015	Győri ETO
Muhamed Bešić	(Bosnia and Herzegovina)	26	0	47	1	2012-2014	Ferencváros
Romeo Mitrović	(Bosnia and Herzegovina)	4	0	37	0	2008-2009	Kecskemét
Stevo Nikolić	(Bosnia and Herzegovina)	2	1	21	5	2011-2012	Debrecen
Túlio Costa	(Brazil)	14	10	11	5	2002	Újpest
Dimitar Makriev	(Bulgaria)	8	1	10	2	2015	Pécsi MFC
Dorge Kouemaha	(Cameroon)	5	0	60	28	2005-2008	Tatabánya; Debrecen
Hervé Tchami	(Cameroon)	1	0	58	7	2010-2013	Szolnoki MÁV; Budapest Honvéd
**Justin Mengolo**	(Cameroon)	2	0	11	1	2017-	Debrecen
Makadji Boukar	(Cameroon)	1	0	2	0	2011	Vasas
Michel N'Doumbé	(Cameroon)	2	0	16	0	1995-1996	Újpest
**Patrick Mevoungou**	(Cameroon)	2	0	21	0	2013-2014, 2016-	Győri ETO; Mezőkövesd
Sadjo Haman	(Cameroon)	2	0	66	4	2007-2008, 2010-2011	Diósgyőr; Újpest; Budapest Honvéd
Dave Simpson	(Canada)	1	0	13	1	2006	Lombard Pápa
**Manjrekar James**	(Canada)	7	1	36	1	2014-	Pécsi MFC; Diósgyőr; Vasas
Stefan Cebara	(Canada)	5	0	2	0	2010	Zalaegerszeg
**Stopira**	(Cape Verde)	24	0	85	6	2012-	Videoton
Zé Luís	(Cape Verde)	14	2	26	9	2013-2014	Videoton
Foxi Kéthévoama	(Central African Republic)	29	4	138	32	2006-2011	Diósgyőr; Újpest; Kecskemét
Darwin Andrade	(Colombia)	3	0	1	0	2014	Újpest
Edixon Perea	(Colombia)	29	9	6	2	2013	Budapest Honvéd
Mirko Marić	(Croatia)	2	0	16	2	2017	Videoton
Nikola Šafarić	(Croatia)	3	0	43	1	2011-2013	Kaposvár
Prince Rajcomar	(Curaçao)	9	3	38	9	2009-2011	Zalaegerszeg
Quenten Martinus	(Curaçao)	4	0	7	0	2013	Ferencváros
**Jan Šimůnek**	(Czech Republic)	5	0	1	0	2017-	Vasas
Luboš Kozel	(Czech Republic)	9	1	12	1	2002	Újpest
Lukáš Zelenka	(Czech Republic)	3	0	19	2	2011	Budapest Honvéd
Marek Heinz	(Czech Republic)	30	5	25	7	2010-2011	Ferencváros
**Marek Střeštík**	(Czech Republic)	1	0	95	17	2012-	Győri ETO; MTK; Mezőkövesd
Martin Klein	(Czech Republic)	1	0	39	5	2011-2013	Ferencváros
Michal Švec	(Czech Republic)	2	0	53	0	2012-2014	Győri ETO
Radek Slončík	(Czech Republic)	17	0	30	1	2002-2003	Újpest
Robert Vágner	(Czech Republic)	2	0	51	15	2001-2002, 2004-2005	Újpest; Ferencváros
Bavon Tshibuabua	(Democratic Republic of the Congo)	1	0	34	7	2012-2014	Újpest
**Kadima Kabangu**	(Democratic Republic of the Congo)	1	0	9	1	2016-	Budapest Honvéd
Landry Mulemo	(Democratic Republic of the Congo)	11	0	11	0	2014	Kaposvár
Rajko Lekic	(Denmark)	1	0	8	2	2007	Zalaegerszeg
Cristian Ramírez	(Ecuador)	8	1	55	4	2015-2016	Ferencváros
Arturo Álvarez	(El Salvador)	42	4	56	8	2013-2015	Videoton
Rafael Burgos	(El Salvador)	51	13	29	6	2012-2014	Kecskemét; Győri ETO
Igor Morozov	(Estonia)	30	0	23	0	2013-2015	Debrecen
Jarmo Ahjupera	(Estonia)	22	1	48	20	2009, 2011-2013	Győri ETO; Újpest
Sander Puri	(Estonia)	70	4	12	0	2011	Lombard Pápa
**Tarmo Kink**	(Estonia)	83	6	79	22	2009-2010, 2013-2014, 2016-	Győri ETO; Kaposvár; Mezőkövesd
Vjatšeslav Zahovaiko	(Estonia)	39	8	2	0	2011	Debrecen
Juha Hakola	(Finland)	1	0	26	3	2011-2013	Ferencváros
Paulus Roiha	(Finland)	20	4	6	1	2007	Újpest
Arsène Copa	(Gabon)	9	0	26	2	2008-2011	Győri ETO
Brice Mackaya	(Gabon)	26	8	11	1	1995-1996	Vasas; Vác
Roguy Méyé	(Gabon)	39	6	54	21	2007-2008, 2011-2012	Zalaegerszeg; Debrecen
Thierry Issiémou	(Gabon)	33	2	5	0	2007-2008	Debrecen; Vasas
**Bachana Arabuli**	(Georgia (country))	3	0	5	2	2017-	Balmazújváros
David Odikadze	(Georgia (country))	14	0	8	0	2009	Győri ETO
Davit Imedashvili	(Georgia (country))	1	0	11	1	2009	Nyíregyháza Spartacus
Giorgi Ganugrava	(Georgia (country))	9	0	45	2	2010-2012	Győri ETO; Lombard Pápa; Zalaegerszeg
Giorgi Kvilitaia	(Georgia (country))	3	0	13	1	2013, 2014-2015	Győri ETO
**Irakli Maisuradze**	(Georgia (country))	2	0	1	0	2017-	Balmazújváros
Kakhaber Chkhetiani	(Georgia (country))	1	0	52	4	2001-2003	Debrecen; Pécsi MFC
**Murtaz Daushvili**	(Georgia (country))	34	0	26	0	2016-	Diósgyőr
Rati Aleksidze	(Georgia (country))	28	2	86	23	2009-2013	Győri ETO
Benjamin Lauth	(Germany)	5	0	23	6	2014-2015	Ferencváros
Princeton Owusu-Ansah	(Ghana)	24	1	3	0	2004	Nyíregyháza Spartacus
William Amamoo	(Ghana)	3	0	2	0	2007	Sopron
Pato	(Guinea)	3	0	10	1	2013	Kecskemét
Jean-Louis Keita	(Guinea)	1	0	9	0	1997	Újpest
Souleymane Youla	(Guinea)	36	13	55	14	2014-2016	Budapest Honvéd
Mamadu	(Guinea-Bissau)	12	0	3	0	2013-2014	Videoton
Alen Bajkuša	(Hong Kong)	3	1	23	2	2000-2001	Tatabánya
Géza Kalocsay	(Hungary) (Czechoslovakia)	2; 3	0; 0	74	35	1939-1943, 1947	Budapest Honvéd; Ferencváros; Újpest; Szentlőrinci AC
Gejza Kocsis	(Hungary) (Czechoslovakia)	2; 1	0; 1	155	79	1934-1941	Újpest
Ferenc Szedlacsek	(Hungary) (Czechoslovakia)	1; 2	0; 1	83	44	1923, 1927-1932	Ferencváros
László Kubala	(Hungary) (Czechoslovakia) (Spain) (Catalonia)	3; 6; 19; 4	0; 4; 11; 4	80	46	1944-1946, 1948	Ganz-MÁVAG; Ferencváros; Vasas
Rezső Patkoló	(Hungary) (Poland)	2; 3	0; 0	94	38	1939-1947	Gamma; Újpest
István Avar	(Hungary) (Romania)	21; 2	24; 3	150	163	1928-1935	Újpest
Iuliu Baratky	(Hungary) (Romania)	9; 20	0; 13	82	51	1928-1933	MTK
Iuliu Bodola	(Hungary) (Romania)	13; 48	4; 30	182	96	1941-1944, 1946-1949	Nagyvárad; MTK
Nicolae Kovács	(Hungary) (Romania)	1; 37	1; 6	28	4	1941-1942, 1944	Nagyvárad; Gamma
Adalbert Marksteiner	(Hungary) (Romania)	1; 2	0; 0	296	165	1940-1951	Csepel
Francisc Mészáros	(Hungary) (Romania)	1; 3	0; 0	113	1	1940-1944	Tokod; Újpest; Nagyvárad; Vasas
József Pecsovszky	(Hungary) (Romania)	3; 32	0; 11	78	5	1942-1944	Nagyvárad
Francisc Spielmann	(Hungary) (Romania)	7; 11	3; 4	99	60	1941-1944	Nagyvárad
Albert Ströck	(Hungary) (Romania)	15; 8	3; 2	93	24	1927-1932	Újpest
Zoltán Szaniszló	(Hungary) (Romania)	1; 5	0; 0	147	2	1931-1935, 1941-1944	Sabaria; MTK; Bocskai; Kolozsvár
Mihai Tänzer	(Hungary) (Romania)	5; 10	1; 1	203	38	1929-1939	Ferencváros
Pál Teleki	(Hungary) (Romania)	8; 1	2; 0	214	90	1928-1938	Bocskai
Mátyás Tóth	(Hungary) (Romania)	16; 2	6; 1	231	85	1936-1944, 1947-1949	Újpest; Phöbus; Nagyvárad; Vasas
Vilmos Sipos	(Hungary) (Socialist Federal Republic of Yugoslavia)	2; 13	0; 1	99	24	1942-1946	Ferencváros
Ferenc Puskás	(Hungary) (Spain)	85; 4	84; 0	349	358	1942-1956	Budapest Honvéd
Amir Hashemi	(Iran)	1	0	3	0	1991	Vasas
Nader Ahmadian	(Iran)	2	0	5	1	1991	Vasas
Emiliano Bonazzoli	(Italy)	1	0	9	0	2014	Budapest Honvéd
Giuseppe Signori	(Italy)	28	7	10	3	2005-2006	Sopron
Luigi Sartor	(Italy)	2	0	7	0	2006	Sopron
Tommaso Rocchi	(Italy)	3	0	17	3	2014-2015	Szombathelyi Haladás
Abdul Kader Keïta	(Ivory Coast)	72	11	2	0	2014	Budapest Honvéd
Abraham	(Ivory Coast)	2	0	74	20	2007-2010	Budapest Honvéd
Benjamin	(Ivory Coast)	17	1	77	1	2006-2009	Budapest Honvéd
Kandia Traoré	(Ivory Coast)	21	6	11	1	2014	Budapest Honvéd
Jason Morrison	(Jamaica)	39	1	24	1	2009-2010	Ferencváros
Rafe Wolfe	(Jamaica)	8	1	72	7	2009-2011, 2012-2014	Ferencváros; MTK; Győri ETO
Ilir Nallbani	(Kosovo)	3	0	3	0	2006	Tatabánya
Zenun Selimi	(Kosovo)	1	0	18	5	1998-1999	Ferencváros
Aleksandrs Jeļisejevs	(Latvia)	37	4	8	0	1996	Stadler
Artjoms Rudņevs	(Latvia)	37	2	30	20	2009-2010	Zalaegerszeg
Daniils Turkovs	(Latvia)	5	0	26	6	2011	Zalaegerszeg
Deniss Ivanovs	(Latvia)	60	2	9	0	2015	Nyíregyháza Spartacus
Mihails Zemļinskis	(Latvia)	105	12	6	0	1994	BVSC
Rolands Bulders	(Latvia)	32	3	21	4	1996	Stadler
**Vitālijs Jagodinskis**	(Latvia)	17	0	12	1	2016-	Diósgyőr
Frank Seator	(Liberia)	14	3	5	1	1995-1996	Videoton
George Gebro	(Liberia)	48	1	5	0	2008	Budapest Honvéd
John Moses	(Liberia)			32	2	1996-1997	Budapest Honvéd
Mle Collins	(Liberia)	3	0	10	0	1997-1998	Tiszakécske
Philip Tarlue	(Liberia)	1	0	38	0	1996-1998	Budapest Honvéd
Victor Carr	(Liberia)	14	6	7	1	2007, 2009	Diósgyőr; Szombathelyi Haladás
Linas Pilibaitis	(Lithuania)	30	0	103	8	2009-2013	Győri ETO; Mezőkövesd
Mindaugas Malinauskas	(Lithuania)	2	0	24	0	2010	Diósgyőr; Debrecen
Robertas Žalys	(Lithuania)	7	1	14	1	1991-1992	Zalaegerszeg
Valdas Urbonas	(Lithuania)	10	0	65	6	1997-1999	Videoton; Gázszer
Vytautas Karvelis	(Lithuania)	6	0	8	0	1997	Videoton
**Souleymane Diarra**	(Mali)	1	0	39	4	2016-	Újpest
André Schembri	(Malta)	74	3	36	15	2010-2011	Ferencváros
Daniel Bogdanović	(Malta)	41	1	1	0	2001	Vasas
Justin Haber	(Malta)	57	0	12	0	2009-2011	Ferencváros
Orosco Anonam	(Malta)	4	0	2	0	2001	Vasas
Rowen Muscat	(Malta)	25	0	7	0	2014	Dunaújváros PASE
Rémi Maréval	(Martinique)	3	0	5	0	2015	Videoton
Serghei Alexeev	(Moldova)	27	6	11	0	2011	Kaposvár
Valeriu Andronic	(Moldova)	36	4	16	0	2002-2003	MTK
Valeriu Căpățână	(Moldova)	4	0	6	0	1993, 1998	BVSC; Nyíregyháza Spartacus
Danijel Petković	(Montenegro)	3	0	26	0	2016-2017	MTK
Darko Nikač	(Montenegro)	3	0	18	2	2016	MTK
Đorđije Ćetković	(Montenegro)	3	0	5	0	2010	Győri ETO
Goran Vujović	(Montenegro)	1	0	68	21	2008-2012	Videoton; Kecskemét; Szombathelyi Haladás; Eger
Ivan Delić	(Montenegro)	2	0	14	1	2011	Zalaegerszeg
Ivan Janjušević	(Montenegro)	1	0	1	0	2011	Vasas
Marko Simić	(Montenegro)	18	0	3	0	2009	Budapest Honvéd
Milan Purović	(Montenegro)	7	0	7	0	2009	Videoton
Mladen Božović	(Montenegro)	38	0	63	0	2010-2013	Videoton
Nebojša Kosović	(Montenegro)	1	0	21	2	2014	Újpest
Vladimir Vujović	(Montenegro)	3	0	10	1	2009	Vasas
Vlado Jeknić	(Montenegro)	6	0	12	1	2009-2010	Diósgyőr
Chemcedine El Araichi	(Morocco)	3	0	1	0	2010	Győri ETO
Almiro Lobo	(Mozambique)	77	8	29	5	2005-2006	Budapest Honvéd
Genito	(Mozambique)	34	1	114	6	2004-2009	Budapest Honvéd
Madzina	(Mozambique)	4	0	1	0	2005	Budapest Honvéd
Mano Mano	(Mozambique)	20	0	3	0	2005	Budapest Honvéd
Marito	(Mozambique)	2	0	2	0	2005	Budapest Honvéd
Glenn Helder	(Netherlands)	4	0	4	0	1999	MTK
Kris Bright	(New Zealand)	5	1	9	1	2011	Budapest Honvéd
**Amadou Moutari**	(Niger)	22	0	21	6	2017-	Ferencváros
**Akeem Latifu**	(Nigeria)	2	0	4	0	2017-	Budapest Honvéd
Emeka Ezeugo	(Nigeria)	11	0	4	0	1994	Budapest Honvéd
Harmony Ikande	(Nigeria)	1	0	2	0	2011	Budapest Honvéd
Henry Isaac	(Nigeria)	2	0	7	0	2011	Siófok
Precious Monye	(Nigeria)	6	0	80	3	1995-1998, 2002-2003	Videoton; Újpest; Videoton
Solomon Okoronkwo	(Nigeria)	3	0	17	4	2012	Pécsi MFC
Teslim Fatusi	(Nigeria)	5	1	19	2	1995-1996	Pécsi MFC; Ferencváros
Tommy Doherty	(Northern Ireland)	9	0	11	0	2010	Ferencváros
Adnan Ahmed	(Pakistan)	27	4	14	0	2009-2010	Ferencváros
Aníbal Godoy	(Panama)	68	1	24	0	2013-2015	Budapest Honvéd
Robert Warzycha	(Poland)	47	7	42	13	1994-1996	Pécsi MFC; Budapest Honvéd
Marco Caneira	(Portugal)	25	0	67	1	2011-2014	Videoton
Aco Stojkov	(North Macedonia)	42	5	45	12	2007-2009	Debrecen; Nyíregyháza Spartacus
Aleksandar Bajevski	(North Macedonia)	5	0	89	23	2003-2006	Győri ETO; Siófok; Ferencváros
Aleksandar Damčevski	(North Macedonia)	4	0	3	0	2017	Mezőkövesd
Dančo Celeski	(North Macedonia)	22	0	69	0	1998-2000	Nyíregyháza Spartacus
**Enis Bardhi**	(North Macedonia)	5	0	60	12	2014-	Újpest
Georgi Hristov	(North Macedonia)	48	16	2	0	2005	Debrecen
**Kire Ristevski**	(North Macedonia)	17	0	49	2	2016-	Vasas
Mirko Ivanovski	(North Macedonia)	27	1	16	2	2015	Videoton
**Viktor Angelov**	(North Macedonia)	1	0	25	2	2016-	Újpest
Vladica Brdarovski	(North Macedonia)	7	0	11	0	2015	Győri ETO
Francis Litsingi	(Republic of the Congo)	9	0	113	29	2008-2012	Újpest; Kecskemét
Jean-Claude Mbemba	(Republic of the Congo)	2	1	171	34	1988-1996	Vasas; Veszprém
Alexandru Suciu	(Romania)	1	0	1	0	1992	Siófok
Zoltán Beke	(Romania)	6	0	13	7	1943-1944	Kolozsvár
Emerich Biro	(Romania)	1	0	14	1	1990-1991	Győri ETO
Ladislau Bonyhádi	(Romania)	3	0	69	41	1941-1944	Szegedi AK; Kolozsvár
Constantin Stănici	(Romania)	1	0	21	5	1996-1997	BVSC
Constantin Varga	(Romania)	1	1	4	1	1994	Győri ETO
Cristian Dulca	(Romania)	6	0	30	0	2002	Budapest Honvéd
Ștefan Dobay	(Romania)	41	19	43	18	1941, 1942, 1945-1946	Törekvés; Diósgyőr
Dorel Mutică	(Romania)	3	0	23	0	2005	Lombard Pápa
Iuliu Farkaș	(Romania)	9	6	41	10	1942-1944	Ferencváros; Kolozsvár
Zoltan Farmati	(Romania)	21	0	2	0	1944	Kolozsvár
Anton Fernbach-Ferenczi	(Romania)	1	0	12	1	1941, 1944, 1945	Kolozsvár; Nagyvárad; Ganz-MÁVAG
Florin Bătrânu	(Romania)	8	0	23	1	2002	Budapest Honvéd
Gabriel Vochin	(Romania)	1	0	36	2	2003-2004	Videoton
Gheorghe Dumitrașcu	(Romania)	2	0	11	0	1996	Győri ETO
Ladislau Incze II	(Romania)	4	0	9	2	1942-1943	Nagyvárad
Ion Adrian Zare	(Romania)	7	0	100	7	1990-1994	Siófok; Pécsi MFC
Ioan Petcu	(Romania)	2	0	28	5	1991-1992	Diósgyőr
Gusztáv Juhász	(Romania)	21	0	76	1	1941-1944	Nagyvárad
Lucian Burchel	(Romania)	2	0	13	1	1993	Nyíregyháza Spartacus
Marian Popa	(Romania)	2	0	5	0	1996	BVSC
Marius Cheregi	(Romania)	6	0	43	1	2000-2002	Ferencváros
Alexandru Marky	(Romania)	4	0	62	0	1942-1944	Kolozsvár; BSZKRT
Zsolt Muzsnay	(Romania)	6	0	42	5	1990-1991, 1992-1993, 1995	Videoton
Ovidiu Lazăr	(Romania)	1	1	8	2	1992	Budapest Honvéd
Adalbert Pall	(Romania)	5	0	66	0	1941-1944	Kolozsvár
Romulus Gabor	(Romania)	35	2	13	1	1991-1992	Diósgyőr
Sándor Schwartz	(Romania)	10	8	52	18	1928-1930	Szegedi AK
Tibor Selymes	(Romania)	46	0	45	4	2002-2004	Szombathelyi Haladás; Debrecen
Augustin Semler	(Romania)	5	6	58	32	1927-1930	Bocskai
Nicolae Simatoc	(Romania)	8	0	41	6	1942-1944	Nagyvárad; Vasas
Sorin Cigan	(Romania)	1	0	69	16	1991-1994	Szegedi EAC; Újpest; Ferencváros; Vasas; Stadler
Sorin Vlaicu	(Romania)	4	0	14	2	1995-1996	Békéscsaba
Iosif Stibinger	(Romania)	2	0	65	14	1942-1944, 1945-1946	Nagyvárad; Elektromos
Gheorghe Váczi	(Romania)	11	8	48	28	1942-1944, 1946	Kolozsvár; Győri ETO
Moise Vass	(Romania)	2	0	91	0	1941-1944	Kolozsvár
Rudolf Wetzer	(Romania)	17	13	49	18	1921-1922, 1928-1930	Törekvés; Újpest; Pécs-Baranya
Abass Rassou	(Rwanda)	2	0	4	0	2007	Diósgyőr
Ibrahima Sidibe	(Senegal)	2	0	160	59	2005-2007, 2012-2016	Debrecen
Đorđe Tutorić	(Serbia)	1	0	30	1	2010-2011	Ferencváros
**Marko Šćepović**	(Serbia)	5	0	28	16	2016-	Videoton
Nikola Mitrović	(Serbia)	1	0	84	8	2010-2013	Újpest; Videoton
Bojan Neziri	(Serbia and Montenegro)	3	0	2	0	2009	Győri ETO
**Dragan Vukmir**	(Serbia and Montenegro)	1	0	292	1	2002-2011, 2012-	Ferencváros; Debrecen; Budapest Honvéd; MTK
Miloš Kolaković	(Serbia and Montenegro)	3	0	6	0	2005	Debrecen
Nikola Trajković	(Serbia and Montenegro)	2	0	98	21	2010-2015	Győri ETO
Alfi Conteh-Lacalle	(Sierra Leone)	1	0	10	0	2010	Nyíregyháza Spartacus; Budapest Honvéd
Branislav Fodrek	(Slovakia)	4	0	20	3	2010-2011	Szombathelyi Haladás
Igor Žofčák	(Slovakia)	14	0	12	0	2015	Nyíregyháza Spartacus
Jozef Majoroš	(Slovakia)	23	5	55	2	2001-2003	Debrecen; Sopron
Juraj Dovičovič	(Slovakia)	2	0	5	1	2007	Zalaegerszeg
Juraj Halenár	(Slovakia)	3	0	13	1	2015	Nyíregyháza Spartacus
Kamil Kopúnek	(Slovakia)	17	2	7	0	2014	Szombathelyi Haladás
Karol Praženica	(Slovakia)	6	0	25	0	2001-2002	Sopron
Ľuboš Hajdúch	(Slovakia)	5	0	86	0	2011-2015	Kaposvár; Puskás Akadémia
Ľuboš Kamenár	(Slovakia)	2	0	37	0	2013-2015	Győri ETO
Marek Krejčí	(Slovakia)	1	0	3	0	2002	Győri ETO
Marek Penksa	(Slovakia)	7	0	107	21	2001-2005	Dunaújváros; Ferencváros
Marián Had	(Slovakia)	14	0	7	0	2013-2014	Győri ETO
Mário Bicák	(Slovakia)	3	0	25	2	2008-2009	Győri ETO
Michal Hanek	(Slovakia)	14	0	20	0	2012-2013	Diósgyőr
Krisztián Németh	(Slovakia)	1	0	12	0	2005	Tatabánya
Ondrej Danko	(Slovakia)	3	0	7	0	1995	Csepel
Ondrej Debnár	(Slovakia)	4	0	11	2	2004	Sopron
Attila Pinte	(Slovakia)	31	1	52	9	2000-2002	Ferencváros
Róbert Semeník	(Slovakia)	8	1	24	5	2002	Győri ETO
Rudolf Urban	(Slovakia)	6	0	2	0	2007	Győri ETO
Stanislav Šesták	(Slovakia)	66	13	30	9	2015-2016	Ferencváros
Otto Szabó	(Slovakia)	3	0	150	7	2003-2006, 2009-2013	MTK; Sopron; Debrecen; Győri ETO; Lombard Pápa
Róbert Vittek	(Slovakia)	82	23	8	2	2016	Debrecen
Tibor Jančula	(Slovakia)	29	9	9	1	2001	Ferencváros
Adem Kapič	(Slovenia)	8	0	80	1	2002-2006	Ferencváros; Vasas
Aleš Kokot	(Slovenia)	10	0	4	0	2010	Kecskemét
Milan Rakić	(Slovenia)	1	0	4	1	2009	Kecskemét
Primož Gliha	(Slovenia)	28	10	5	1	2000	Zalaegerszeg
Rene Mihelič	(Slovenia)	3	0	31	4	2014-2015	Debrecen
Rok Kronaveter	(Slovenia)	1	0	38	7	2012-2014	Győri ETO
Zoran Zeljkovič	(Slovenia)	1	0	34	2	2011-2013	Pécsi MFC
Suk Hyun-jun	(South Korea)	11	4	13	1	2017	Debrecen
Imad Zatara	(Palestine)	28	3	12	3	2008	Zalaegerszeg
Jenő Ábrahám	(Socialist Federal Republic of Yugoslavia)	2	2	41	5	1926-1930	Szegedi AK
Aleksandar Jović	(Socialist Federal Republic of Yugoslavia)	1	0	56	13	2001-2003	Ferencváros
Bojan Brnović	(Socialist Federal Republic of Yugoslavia)	2	1	113	35	2005-2010	Debrecen; Győri ETO; Diósgyőr
Igor Bogdanović	(Socialist Federal Republic of Yugoslavia)	5	1	127	48	2004-2008, 2009-2010	Debrecen; Budapest Honvéd; Győri ETO; Nyíregyháza Spartacus; Szombathelyi Haladás
Ivan Dudić	(Socialist Federal Republic of Yugoslavia)	7	0	62	0	2007-2010	Zalaegerszeg; Újpest
Petar Divić	(Socialist Federal Republic of Yugoslavia)	2	0	50	14	2008-2010	Vasas
Saša Ilić	(Socialist Federal Republic of Yugoslavia)	2	0	4	0	2002	Zalaegerszeg
Saša Stevanović	(Socialist Federal Republic of Yugoslavia)	4	0	258	0	2004-2013	Győri ETO
Geza Šifliš	(Socialist Federal Republic of Yugoslavia)	5	0	6	0	1928-1929, 1931	Szegedi AK; Ferencváros; Újpest
**Vukašin Poleksić**	(Socialist Federal Republic of Yugoslavia) (Montenegro)	1; 38	0; 0	166	1	2006-2010, 2012, 2014-2015, 2016-	Tatabánya; Debrecen; Kecskemét; Pécsi MFC; Békéscsaba; Vasas SC
**Danko Lazović**	(Socialist Federal Republic of Yugoslavia) (Serbia and Montenegro) (Serbia)	1; 3; 43	0; 0; 11	36	14	2016-	Videoton
Ayub Daud	(Somalia)	40	6	16	7	2013-2014	Budapest Honvéd
MacBeth Sibaya	(South Africa)	62	0	7	0	1998	III. Kerület
Vasyl Rats	(Soviet Union)	47	4	7	1	1991-1992	Ferencváros
Viktor Hrachov	(Soviet Union)	1	0	83	18	1990-1994	Debrecen; BVSC; Debrecen
Oleg Shirinbekov	(Soviet Union) (Tajikistan)	3; 1	0; 0	85	5	1991-1994	Vasas
Haruna Jammeh	(The Gambia)	2	1	53	4	2011-2014	Budapest Honvéd; Kaposvár
Euloge Ahodikpe	(Togo)	9	0	28	0	2008-2009, 2015	Diósgyőr; Lombard Pápa
Francis Koné	(Togo)	2	0	2	0	2015	Budapest Honvéd
Kassim Guyazou	(Togo)	18	0	2	0	2007	Diósgyőr
Akeem Adams	(Trinidad and Tobago)	9	0	6	0	2013	Ferencváros
Densill Theobald	(Trinidad and Tobago)	99	2	8	1	2007	Újpest
Martin Mutumba	(Uganda)	7	0	3	0	2010	Videoton
Oleksandr Bondarenko	(Ukraine)	2	0	138	6	1994-1999	BVSC
Oleksiy Antonov	(Ukraine)	2	0	5	0	2017	Gyirmót
Christopher Sullivan	(United States)	19	2	16	1	1989-1990, 1996	Győri ETO
Peter Vermes	(United States)	67	11	9	0	1988-1989	Győri ETO
Frank Feltscher	(Venezuela)	14	2	12	1	2017	Debrecen
Jesús Meza	(Venezuela)	7	0	4	0	2015	Budapest Honvéd
Lloyd Mumba	(Zambia)	6	0	14	1	2005-2006	Lombard Pápa
Misheck Lungu	(Zambia)	37	1	20	0	2006, 2009	Lombard Pápa; Budapest Honvéd

== Players appeared at FIFA World Cup ==
Name	Country	World Cup
Nicolae Kovács	(Romania)	1930, 1934, 1938
Rudolf Wetzer	(Romania)	1930
Géza Kalocsay	(Czechoslovakia)	1934
Iuliu Baratky	(Romania)	1934, 1938
Iuliu Bodola	(Romania)	1934, 1938
Zoltán Beke	(Romania)	1934
Ștefan Dobay	(Romania)	1934, 1938
Gusztáv Juhász	(Romania)	1934
Sándor Schwartz	(Romania)	1934
Ferenc Puskás	(Spain)	1962
Vasyl Rats	(Soviet Union)	1986, 1990
Zsolt Muzsnay	(Romania)	1990
Christopher Sullivan	(United States)	1990
Peter Vermes	(United States)	1990
Giuseppe Signori	(Italy)	1994
Emeka Ezeugo	(Nigeria)	1994
Tibor Selymes	(Romania)	1994, 1998
Cristian Dulca	(Romania)	1998
Marco Caneira	(Portugal)	2002, 2006
MacBeth Sibaya	(South Africa)	2002, 2010
Marek Heinz	(Czech Republic)	2006
Abdul Kader Keïta	(Ivory Coast)	2006, 2010
Densill Theobald	(Trinidad and Tobago)	2006
Benjamin	(Ivory Coast)	2010
Danko Lazović	(Serbia)	2010
Kamil Kopúnek	(Slovakia)	2010
Róbert Vittek	(Slovakia)	2010
Stanislav Šesták	(Slovakia)	2010
Anel Hadžić	(Bosnia and Herzegovina)	2014
Muhamed Bešić	(Bosnia and Herzegovina)	2014

== Gallery ==
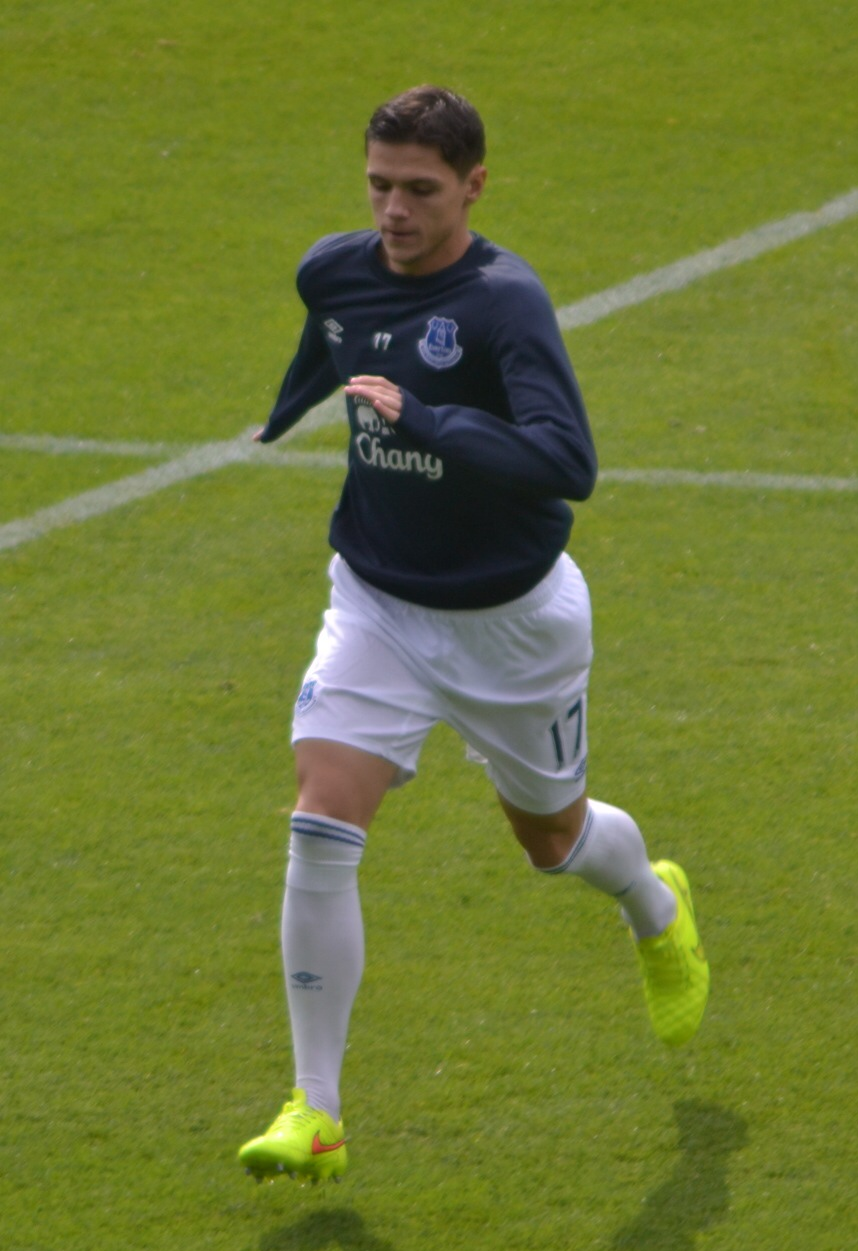
Muhamed Bešić

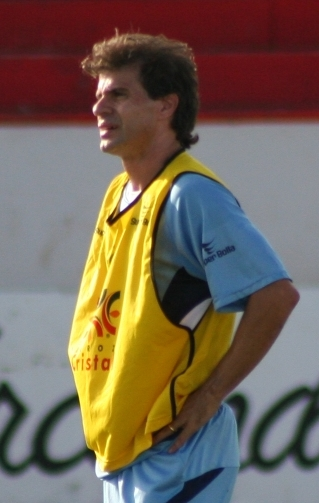
Túlio Costa

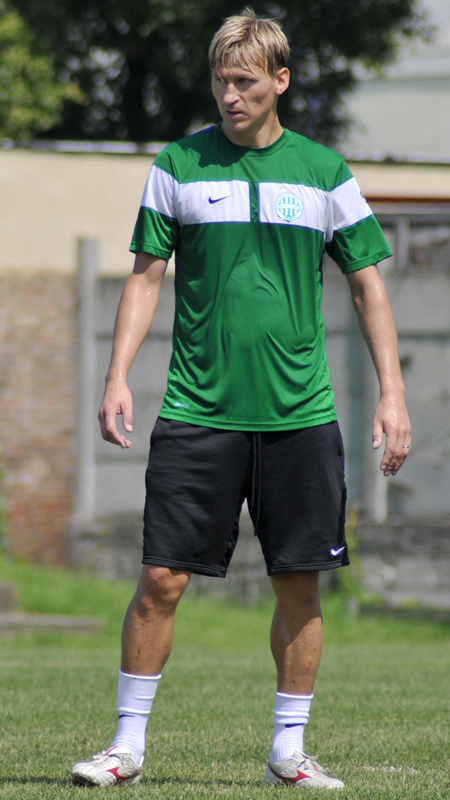
Marek Heinz

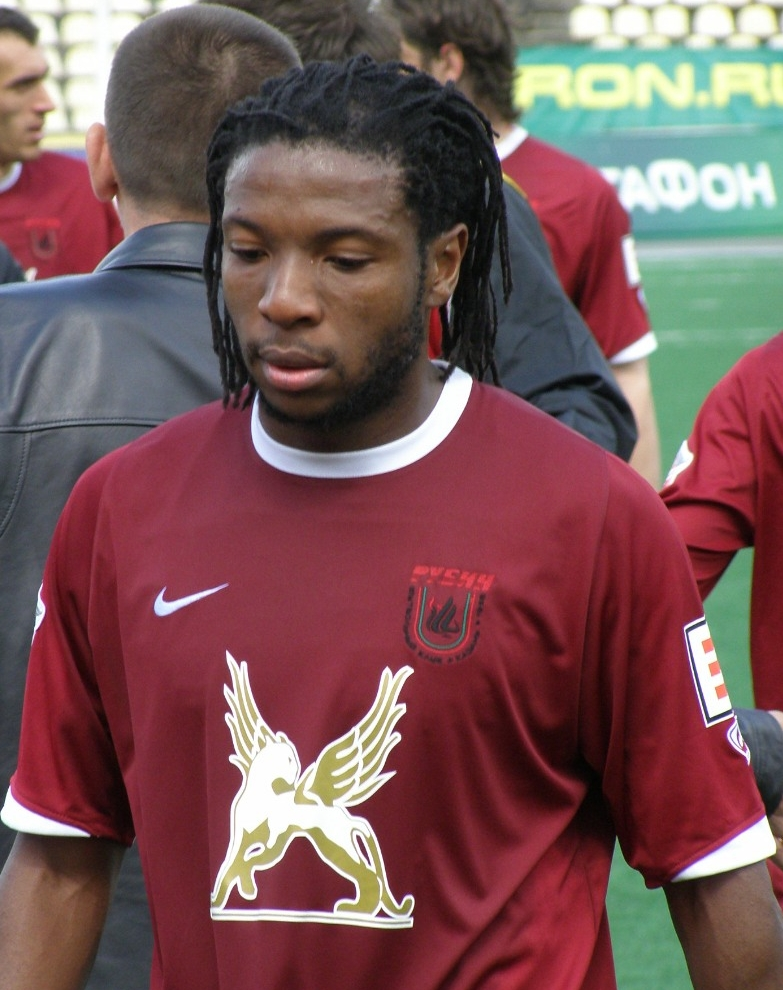
MacBeth Sibaya

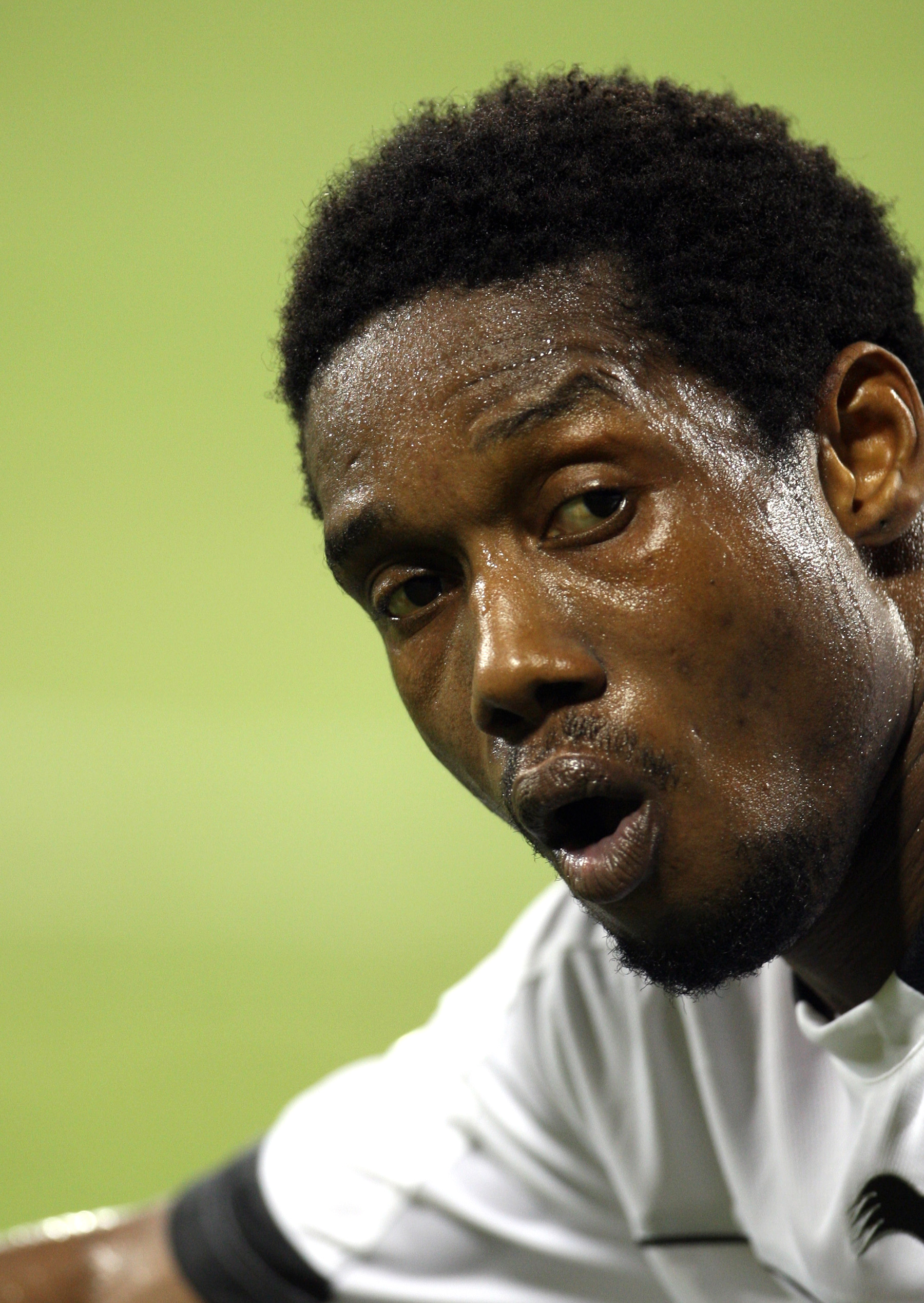
Abdul Kader Keïta

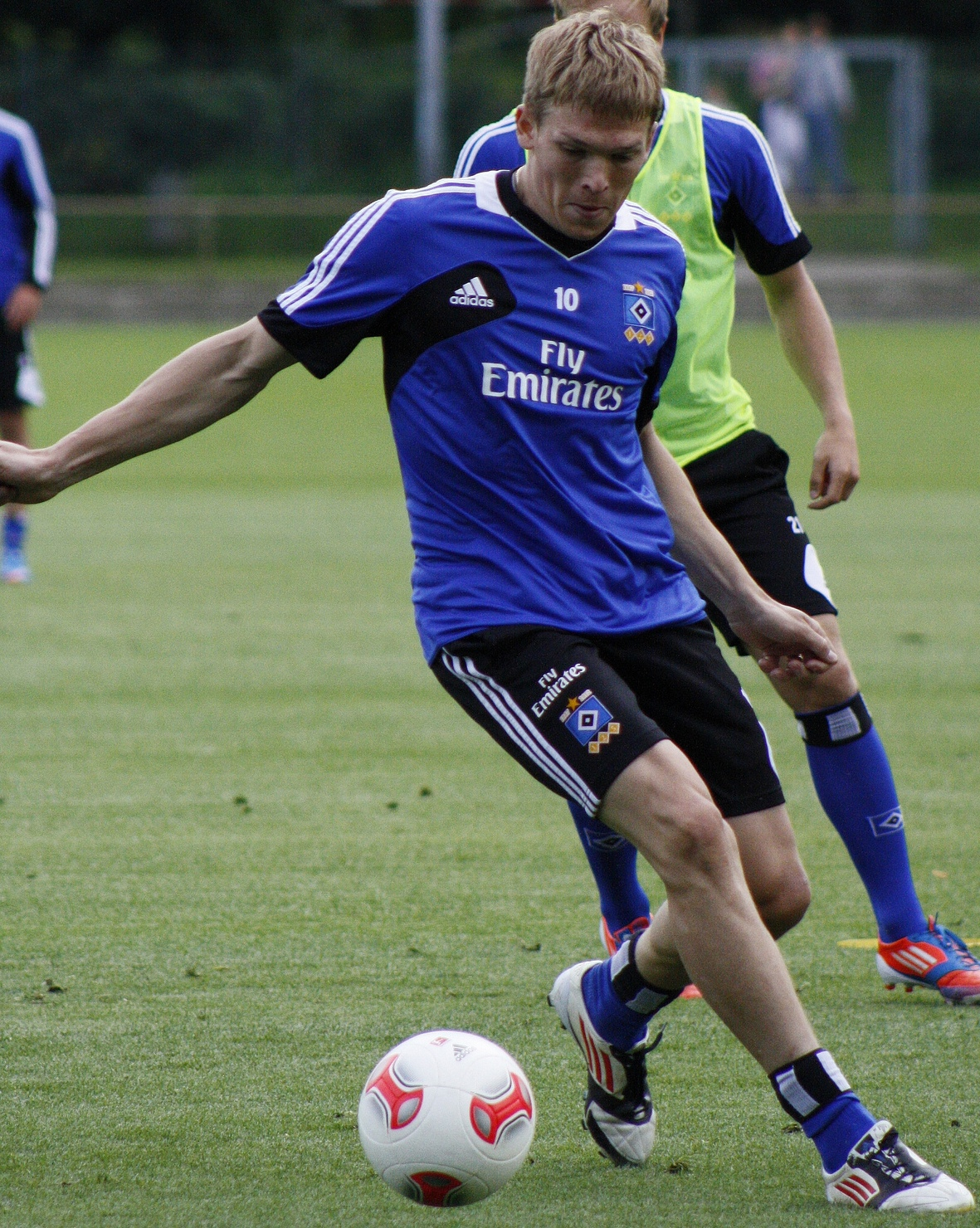
Artjoms Rudnevs

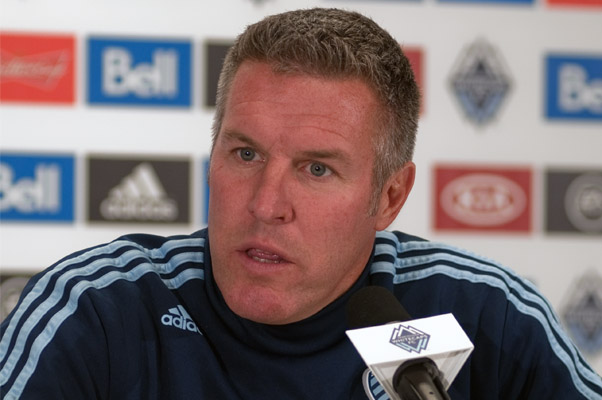
Peter Vermes

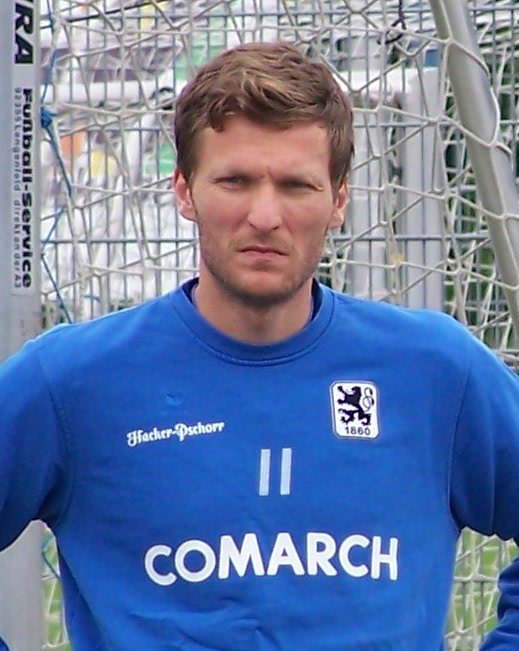
Benjamin Lauth
