= 1943–44 CA Oradea season =

Nagyváradi AC
1943–44 season
- Manager: Ferenc Rónay
- Stadium: Városi
- Magyar Kupa: Preliminary Round
- Top goalscorer: League: Spielmann (23); All: Spielmann (23)
- Highest home attendance: 10,000 vs Ferencváros (21 May 1944)
- Lowest home attendance: 4,000 vs Szeged (18 April 1944); 4,000 vs BSZKRT (4 June 1944)
- Average home league attendance: 5,400
Home colours	Away colours

The 1943–44 season was CA Oradea's 22nd season, 5th in the Hungarian football league system and their 3rd season in the Nemzeti Bajnokság I. In this season the club was known as Nagyváradi Atletikai Club, Nagyváradi AC or simply as NAC and managed to obtain the first big performance in the history of the football from Oradea, a Nemzeti Bajnokság I title. A title won in a league considered to be one of the best in Europe at that time, also being the first club outside Budapest that won the Hungarian championship in 41 official seasons.

== First team squad ==
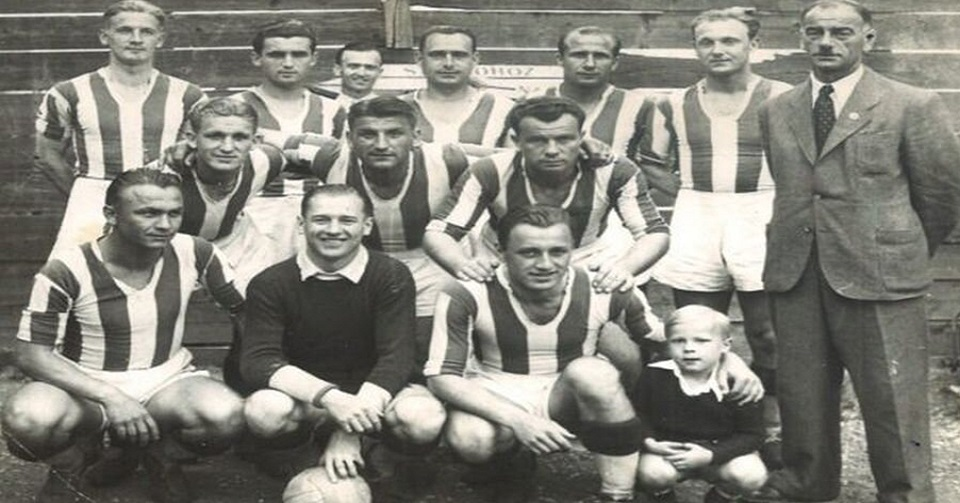
CA Oradea (1943–1944)

Note: Flags indicate national team as defined under FIFA eligibility rules; some limited exceptions apply. Players may hold more than one non-FIFA nationality.

No.	Pos.	Nation	Player
—	GK	HUN	Adolf Vécsey
—	DF	HUN	Gyula Lóránt
—	DF	HUN	Francisc Mészáros
—	DF	HUN	Andor Ónody
—	MF	ROU	Rudolf Demetrovics
—	MF	ROU	Gusztáv Juhász
—	MF	HUN	József Pecsovszky
—	MF	ROU	Nicolae Simatoc

No.	Pos.	Nation	Player
—	FW	HUN	Iuliu Bodola
—	FW	HUN	György Csapó
—	FW	HUN	Anton Fernbach-Ferenczi
—	FW	HUN	Nicolae Kovács
—	FW	HUN	Francisc Spielmann
—	FW	ROU	Iosif Stibinger
—	FW	HUN	Mátyás Tóth

== Competitions ==
=== League standings ===
Pos	Team	Pld	W	D	L	GF	GA	GR	Pts
1	Nagyváradi AC (C)	30	24	1	5	78	36	2.167	49
2	Ferencvárosi TC	30	16	4	10	71	46	1.543	36
3	Kolozsvár AC	30	15	6	9	54	45	1.200	36
4	Gamma FC	30	14	7	9	53	40	1.325	35
5	Újpest FC	30	13	7	10	92	59	1.559	33

Source: magyarfutball.hu and rsssf.com
Rules for classification: Rules for classification: 1) Points 2) Goal difference; 3) Goals scored.
(C) Champions

==== Result round by round ====
Round	1	2	3	4	5	6	7	8	9	10	11	12	13	14	15	16	17	18	19	20	21	22	23	24	25	26	27	28	29	30
Ground	A	H	H	H	A	H	A	A	H	A	H	A	H	A	H	A	H	A	H	H	A	H	A	A	A	H	A	H	A	H
Result	W	W	W	W	L	W	W	W	W	W	W	W	W	L	L	W	W	W	W	W	W	W	D	W	L	W	L	W	W	W
Position	2	1	1	1	2	1	1	1	1	1	1	1	1	1	1	1	1	1	1	1	1	1	1	1	1	1	1	1	1	1

Source: nela.hu
A = Away; H = Home; W = Win; D = Draw; L = Loss

==== Results ====
22 August 1943 1	Szolnok	2–5	Nagyváradi AC	Szolnok
17:00 UTC+2	Korom 42'; F.Nagy 70'	Report	Bodola 27'; Spielmann 63', 66'; Tóth 73'; Kovács 89'	Stadium: Véső utca Attendance: 2,000; Referee: Ferenc Palásti

29 August 1943 2	Nagyváradi AC	4–1	Kolozsvár AC	Nagyvárad
17:00 UTC+2	Simatoc 12'; Kovács 34'; Bodola 58', 76'	Report	Beke 74'	Stadium: Városi; Attendance: 5,000; Referee: Gusztáv Lantos

5 September 1943 3	Nagyváradi AC	2–1	Vasas	Nagyvárad
16:00 UTC+2	Kovács 24', 65'	Report	Jenőfi 72'	Stadium: Városi; Attendance: 5,000; Referee: József Kékesi

26 September 1943 4	Nagyváradi AC	3–1	Csepel	Nagyvárad
16:00 UTC+2	Tóth 8'; Stibinger 49'; Bodola 69'	Report	Szalay 60'	Stadium: Városi; Attendance: 6,000; Referee: József Szőke

3 October 1943 5	Újpest	2–1	Nagyváradi AC	Budapest
14:00 UTC+2	Penderi 67'; Szusza 70'	Report	Spielmann 87'	Stadium: Megyeri úti Attendance: 26,000; Referee: Sándor Harangozó

10 October 1943 6	Nagyváradi AC	2–0	Debrecen	Nagyvárad
14:00 UTC+2	Spielmann 3'; Tóth 64'	Report		Stadium: Városi; Attendance: 5,000; Referee: Nándor Jania

17 October 1943 7	Salgótarján	1–2	Nagyváradi AC	Salgótarján
14:00 UTC+2	Bognár 71'	Report	Spielmann 21'; Tóth 35'	Stadium: Tó-strandi; Attendance: 6,000; Referee: Antal Vass

24 October 1943 8	Elektromos	3–4	Nagyváradi AC	Budapest
14:00 UTC+2	Marosi 45', 61', 69'	Report	Tóth 15', 64'; Spielmann 40', 47'	Stadium: Latorca utca Attendance: 8,000; Referee: Pál Nagy

31 October 1943 9	Nagyváradi AC	1–0	Újvidék	Nagyvárad
14:00 UTC+1	Bodola 31'	Report		Stadium: Városi; Attendance: 6,000; Referee: Kálmán Rónai

14 November 1943 10	Tisza Szeged	1–2	Nagyváradi AC	Szeged
13:00 UTC+1	Koppány 12'	Report	Bodola 58'; Tóth 73'	Stadium: Szegedi VSE; Attendance: 8,000; Referee: Pál Nagy

21 November 1943 11	Nagyváradi AC	2–1	Gamma	Nagyvárad
13:00 UTC+1	Kovács 3'; Lóránt 86'	Report	Kincses 36'	Stadium: Városi; Attendance: 5,000; Referee: Henrik Thomas

28 November 1943 12	BSZKRT	0–2	Nagyváradi AC	Budapest
13:00 UTC+1		Report	Bodola 32'; Spielmann 84'	Stadium: Sport utca Attendance: 12,000; Referee: Ernő Kiss

5 December 1943 13	Nagyváradi AC	3–0	Kispest	Nagyvárad
13:00 UTC+1	Spielmann 15'; Simatoc 54'; Kovács 62'	Report		Stadium: Városi; Attendance: 5,000; Referee: Ernő Kiss

8 December 1943 14	Ferencváros	1–0	Nagyváradi AC	Budapest
13:00 UTC+1	Polgár 13'	Report		Stadium: Üllői úti Attendance: 22,000; Referee: Gusztáv Lantos

12 December 1943 15	Nagyváradi AC	1–2	Diósgyőr	Nagyvárad
13:00 UTC+1	Lóránt 34'	Report	Turbéky 11'; Fazekas 25'	Stadium: Városi; Attendance: 5,000; Referee: Ferenc Palásti

27 February 1944 16	Újvidék	1–3	Nagyváradi AC	Újvidék
13:00 UTC+1	Pálfi 8'	Report	Bodola 13'; Tóth 65'; Spielmann 81'	Stadium: Horthy; Attendance: 7,000; Referee: Antal Vass

5 March 1944 17	Nagyváradi AC	1–0	Salgótarján	Nagyvárad
14:00 UTC+1	Tóth 47'	Report		Stadium: Városi; Attendance: 5,000; Referee: Gusztáv Lantos

12 March 1944 18	Debrecen	1–2	Nagyváradi AC	Debrecen
14:00 UTC+1	Csokai 38'	Report	Bodola 27'; Pecsovszky 56'	Stadium: Diószegi út Attendance: 12,000; Referee: Rezső Emődi

19 March 1944 19	Nagyváradi AC	2–1	Újpest	Nagyvárad
14:00 UTC+1	Spielmann 15', 86'	Report	Szusza 48'	Stadium: Városi; Attendance: 5,000; Referee: Ernő Kiss

2 April 1944 20	Csepel	1–3	Nagyváradi AC	Budapest
16:00 UTC+2	Keszthelyi 74'	Report	Tóth 30'; Spielmann 71'; Stibinger 90'	Stadium: Béke téri Attendance: 5,000; Referee: Árpád Székely

9 April 1944 21	Nagyváradi AC	2–1	Elektromos	Nagyvárad
16:00 UTC+2	Spielmann 12'; Pecsovszky 14'	Report	Hidegkuti 40'	Stadium: Városi; Attendance: 6,000; Referee: Béla Szilágyi

16 April 1944 22	Vasas	1–1	Nagyváradi AC	Budapest
16:00 UTC+2	G.Tóth 47'	Report	Spielmann 39'	Stadium: Latorca utca Attendance: 20,000; Referee: Gusztáv Lantos

18 April 1944 23	Nagyváradi AC	4–1	Tisza Szeged	Nagyvárad
16:00 UTC+2	Lóránt 15'; Spielmann 20', 21', 50'	Report	Tihanyi 8'	Stadium: Városi; Attendance: 4,000; Referee: József Pusztai

23 April 1944 24	Gamma	1–2	Nagyváradi AC	Budapest
16:00 UTC+2	Komlódi 75'	Report	Lóránt 61'; Spielmann 70'	Stadium: Hungária körúti Attendance: 7,000; Referee: Ferenc Palásti

30 April 1944 25	Kolozsvár AC	2–1	Nagyváradi AC	Kolozsvár
16:00 UTC+2	Füstös 31'; Bonyhádi 79'	Report	Lóránt 65'	Stadium: Kolozsvár; Attendance: 9,000; Referee: Pál Nagy

7 May 1944 26	Nagyváradi AC	3–1	Szolnok	Nagyvárad
17:00 UTC+2	Bodola 21', 57'; Tóth 70'	Report	Kolláth 82'	Stadium: Városi; Attendance: 5,000; Referee: Aurél Mann

14 May 1944 27	Diósgyőr	4–3	Nagyváradi AC	Diósgyőr
17:00 UTC+2	Fazekas 15'; Csepregi 31'; Füzér 66'; Turbéky 85'	Report	Tóth 44'; Bodola 54', 88'	Stadium: Diósgyőr; Attendance: 7,000; Referee: István Rudas

21 May 1944 28	Nagyváradi AC	5–1	Ferencváros	Nagyvárad
17:00 UTC+2	Spielmann 52'; Rudas 57' (o.g.); Bodola 63'; Stibinger 79'; Lóránt 86'	Report	Tátrai 76'	Stadium: Városi; Attendance: 10,000; Referee: Ernő Kiss

28 May 1944 29	Kispest	2–3	Nagyváradi AC	Budapest
17:00 UTC+2	Nemes 37', 83'	Report	Spielmann 43'; Bodola 47'; Tóth 54'	Stadium: Imre Szent; Attendance: 8,000; Referee: Gusztáv Lantos

4 June 1944 30	Nagyváradi AC	9–2	BSZKRT	Nagyvárad
17:00 UTC+2	Bodola 3'; Lóránt 25', 38', 62', 74', 87'; Tóth 55'; Spielmann 64', 83'	Report	Mészáros 59'; Szabó 77'	Stadium: Városi; Attendance: 4,000; Referee: Sándor Harangozó

=== Magyar Kupa ===
Preliminary Round.

== See also ==
- 1943–44 Magyar Kupa
- Nemzeti Bajnokság I
