= List of Hungary international footballers born outside Hungary =

In this list there are all the football players born outside Hungary who played at least one game for the Hungary national team. This includes people of Hungarian descent born outside Hungary as well as those that gained nationality while playing in the Hungarian football league system.

== List ==
All the players in bold are currently playing for Hungary. Last update on 25 November 2022

=== Austria ===
==== Austria–Hungary ====
- Paul von Goldberger 1908 (1) (0)
- József Jeszmás 1923–27 (4) (1)
- Engelbert Klement 1914–15 (2) (0)
- Frigyes Mandl 1914 (1) (0)
- Aladár Niessner 1903–07 (5) (0)
- Vilmos Sipos 1945–46 (2) (0)

=== (Brazil) Brasil ===
- Leandro de Almeida 2004–15 (16) (0)
- Paulo Vinícius 2017–2018 (7) (0)

=== Croatia ===
==== Austria–Hungary ====
- István Miklósi 1937–38 (3) (1)
- Károly Oláh 1902–06 (2) (0)
- István Skrobák 1903 (2) (0)

=== France ===
- **Loïc Nego** 2020– (46) (2)
- István Nyers 1945–46 (2) (2)

=== Germany ===
- **Willi Orbán** 2018– (61) (6)
- **Palkó Dárdai** 2022– (1) (0)
- **Márton Dárdai** 2024– (18) (0)
- **Bence Dárdai** 2025– (3) (0)

=== (United Kingdom) Great Britain ===
- **Callum Styles** 2022– (27) (0)

=== Nigeria ===
- Kenneth Otigba 2018 (2) (0)
- Thomas Sowunmi 1999–2006 (10) (1)

=== Romania ===
==== Austria–Hungary ====
- Iuliu Baratky 1930–33 (9) (0)
- Lajos Baróti 1939–41 (2) (0)
- Elemér Berkessy 1928–30 (7) (0)
- Iuliu Bodola 1940–48 (13) (4)
- Vilmos Dán 1927 (2) (0)
- János Füzér 1942 (1) (0)
- Béla Kelemen 1911 (1) (0)
- Nándor Koch 1904–05 (2) (1)
- János Kovács 1943 (1) (0)
- Nicolae Kovács 1941 (1) (1)
- Francisc Spielmann 1940–43 (7) (3)
- Albert Ströck 1927–32 (15) (3)
- Zoltán Szaniszló 1932 (1) (0)
- Mihai Tänzer 1930–32 (5) (1)

==== Kingdom of Romania ====
- Sándor Gellér 1950–56 (8) (0)
- Adalbert Marksteiner 1943 (1) (0)
- Andrej Prean Nagy 1943 (3) (0)
- József Pecsovszky 1942–43 (3) (0)
- Imre Szabó 1945–47 (2) (0)
- Gyula Teleki 1953–56 (3) (0)
- János Zsolnai 1947 (2) (2)

==== Socialist Republic of Romania ====
- Csaba Csizmadia 2007–08 (12) (0)
- Ákos Koller 2005 (2) (0)
- Vasile Miriuță 2000–03 (9) (1)

=== Serbia ===
==== Austria–Hungary ====
- Jenő Konrád 1915 (1) (0)
- Kálmán Konrád 1914–28 (12) (2)
- István Reiner 1925 (1) (0)
- András Tihanyi 1942 (1) (1)
- Jenő Vincze 1930–39 (25) (8)

==== SFR Yugoslavia ====
- Predrag Bošnjak 2014 (1) (0)
- Zsombor Kerekes 2004–05 (9) (2)
- Norbert Könyves 2020 (5) (1)
- Nemanja Nikolić 2013–2021 (43) (8)
- Lajos Szűcs 1967–73 (37) (2)
- Mihály Tóth 1949–57 (6) (1)

==== FR Yugoslavia ====
- Filip Holender 2018–2021 (16) (1)
- **Milos Kerkez** 2022– (27) (0)

=== South Africa ===
- **András Németh** 2022– (4) (1)

=== Slovakia ===
==== Austria–Hungary ====
- Sándor Bródy 1906–13 (17) (1)
- Kálmán Csontos 1923–24 (2) (1)
- István Friedrich 1923–24 (1) (0)
- Béla von Kehrling 1914–16 (4) (0)
- Gyula Kertész 1912 (1) (0)
- Gejza Kocsis 1937 (2) (0)
- Iván Medgyessy 1908 (1) (0)
- János Stófián 1926–30 (4) (2)
- József Viola 1920 (1) (0)

==== Czechoslovakia ====
- László Gyetvai 1938–42 (17) (3)
- Péter Juhász 1971–73 (24) (1)
- Francisc Mészáros 1943 (1) (0)
- Ferenc Nógrádi 1963–65 (4) (0)
- Tamás Priskin 2005–2017 (63) (17)
- György Szabó 1979 (1) (0)

==== Slovakia ====
- **Attila Mocsi** 2024- (2) (0)

=== Ukraine ===
==== Austria–Hungary ====
- Géza Kalocsay 1940 (2) (0)

==== Soviet Union ====
- Koman Vladimir 2010–2015 (36) (7)
- György Sándor 2006–2014 (9) (0)

=== United States ===
- Gyula Rémay 1926 (1) (0)
- János Rémay 1925–27 (6) (1)

== List by country ==
Birthplace	Players
Romania	24
Slovakia	16
Serbia	13
Austria	6
Germany	4
Croatia	3
Ukraine	3
Brazil	2
France	2
Nigeria	2
United States	2
United Kingdom	1
South Africa	1

== Notes ==
1. Capped for the Czechoslovakia national football team
2. Capped for the Romania national football team
3. Capped for the Yugoslavia national football team
