= Norberto Höfling =

Romanian footballer and coach

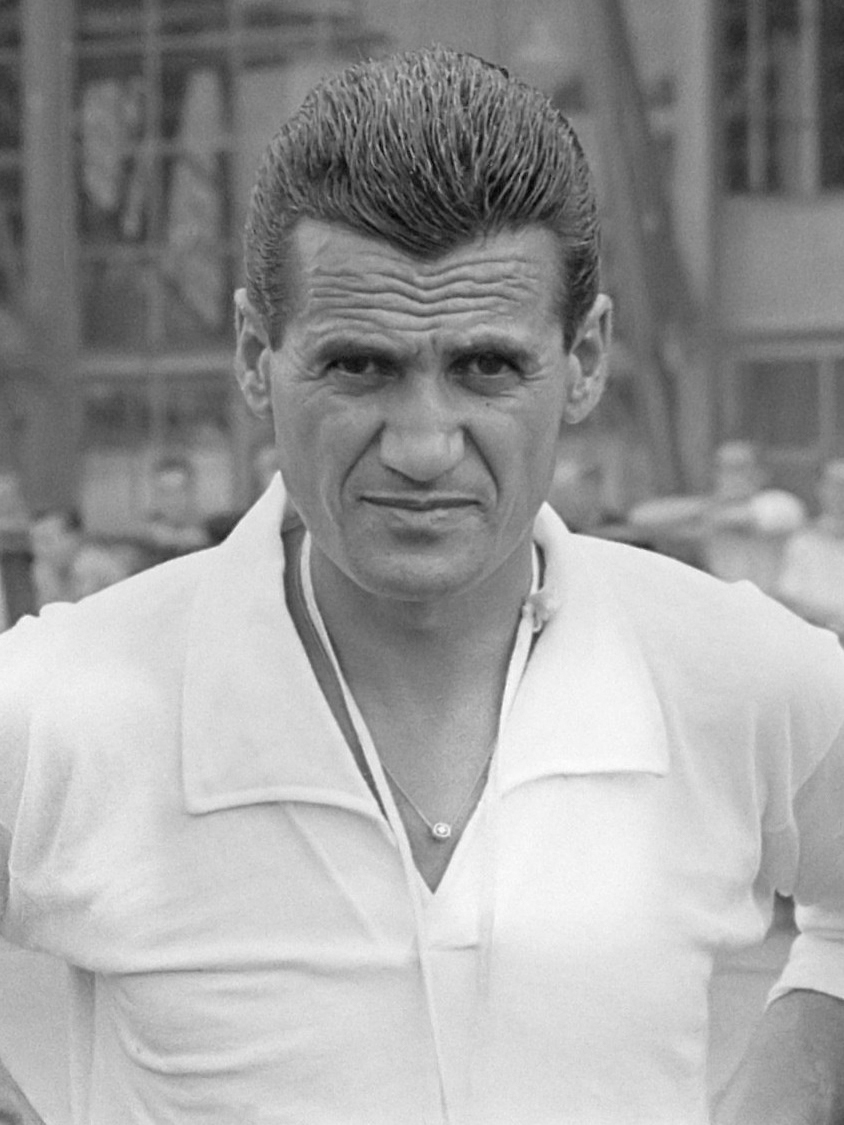
- Höfling in 1963

Personal information
- Date of birth: 20 June 1924
- Place of birth: Cernăuți, Kingdom of Romania
- Date of death: 18 April 2005 (aged 80)
- Place of death: Bruges, Belgium
- Height: 1.76 m (5 ft 9 in)
- Position: Forward

Senior career*
Years	Team	Apps	(Gls)
1945–1946	Dinamo Cernăuți		
1946–1947	Ciocanul București	35	(24)
1948	MTK Budapest	24	(23)
1949–1951	Lazio	72	(25)
1952–1955	Pro Patria	119	(31)
1955–1956	Vicenza	9	(1)
Total		260	(104)

Managerial career
- 1957–1963: Club Brugge
- 1963–1964: Feyenoord
- 1964–1967: Racing White Brussels
- 1967–1968: Club Brugge
- 1968–1969: Anderlecht
- 1969–1971: Daring Club Brussels
- 1972–1976: AS Oostende
- 1977–1978: Gent
- 1980–1981: Pro Patria
- * Club domestic league appearances and goals

Norberto Höfling (20 June 1924 – 18 April 2005) was a Romanian footballer and manager.

== Playing career ==
=== Dinamo Cernăuți ===
Höfling, who was of Jewish origin, was born on 20 June 1924 in Cernăuți, Kingdom of Romania. He began playing junior-level football at local club Dinamo. He started his senior career in 1945 by playing for Dinamo in the Soviet Union's lower leagues and the Spartakiad.

=== Ciocanul București ===
In 1946, Höfling went to play for Ciocanul București, making his Divizia A debut on 25 August 1946 under coach Béla Guttmann and scoring the game-winning goal in a 1–0 home win over Ferar Cluj. Höfling scored 22 goals by the end of the 1946–47 season, which made him the top-scorer of Ciocanul and the third top-scorer of the league, after Ladislau Bonyhádi and Iosif Kovács. In the first half of the 1947–48 season, he scored two goals in 10 matches.

=== MTK Budapest ===
In 1948, Höfling joined Hungarian side MTK Budapest, making his Nemzeti Bajnokság I debut on 8 February under coach Márton Bukovi in a 2–0 loss to Újpest. In the following match, he scored his first goal in the competition in a 6–1 win over ESMTK. Höfling netted 14 times until the end of his first season, which included five goals in a 9–0 victory against Szolnoki. In the first half of the 1948–49 season, he scored 11 goals, including a hat-trick in a 4–0 win over Tatabánya.

=== Lazio ===
In January 1949, Höfling went to play in Italy for Lazio. He made his Serie A debut on 13 February under coach Mario Sperone in a 1–1 draw against Atalanta. He scored his first goal in the competition on 13 March in a 2–2 draw against Torino. In the 1949–50 season, he netted 13 goals, including two hat-tricks in wins over Novara and Como. Subsequently, he scored 11 goals in the following season.

=== Pro Patria ===
Höfling joined Pro Patria in 1951 and made his first league appearance under coach Mario Varglien in a 2–2 draw against Padova in which he closed the scoring. On 6 April 1952, he scored a brace in a 2–0 success over Bologna. The team suffered relegation to Serie B at the end of the 1952–53 season, but Höfling stayed with the club, helping it gain promotion back to the first league after one year by netting 11 goals. Afterwards, he scored eight goals in the 1954–55 season, including one goal in a win over his former club Lazio, and a double in a 3–1 victory against Genoa.

=== Vicenza ===
In 1955, Höfling moved from pro Patria to fellow Serie A club Vicenza. He made his first league appearance for them on 18 September, playing the entire match under coach Béla Guttmann in a 4–1 loss to AS Roma. He scored his first goal for Vicenza, opening the scoring in a 3–1 away win over Sampdoria. Höfling made his last Serie A appearance on 6 November 1956 in a 0–0 draw against Juventus, totaling 169 matches with 48 goals in the competition.

== Managerial career ==
In 1957, at the age of 33, Höfling began his managerial career at the Belgian Second Division club Club Brugge. He successfully guided the team to promotion into the Belgian First Division by the end of the 1958–59 season. After six years, a dispute with the team's star player, Fernand Goyvaerts, prompted Höfling to leave and take over as coach of the Dutch club Feyenoord. Though sacked from Feyenoord after just one year, he returned to Belgium shortly after signing with Racing White Brussels, once again leading his new squad to a first-division promotion.

Höfling returned to Club Brugge and helped the team win the 1967–68 Belgian Cup after defeating Beerschot in the final. Subsequently, in 1968 he was appointed head coach at Anderlecht. He led them during the 1968–69 European Cup campaign, as they got past Glentoran in the first round before being defeated 4–3 on aggregate by Manchester United in the second round.

In 1969, Höfling went to coach for two seasons at the second-tier club Daring Club Brussels but failed to help them gain promotion to the first division. However, he guided them to reach the 1970 Belgian Cup final, where they suffered a 6–1 loss to Club Brugge. Later he was employed by AS Oostende, leading them to promotion from the third division to the second and then from the second to the first. He went to work in the 1977–78 season at the second-tier club Gent. His last coaching experience took place in Italy in the early 1980s at the club for which he previously played, Pro Patria.

== Writing ==
Höfling wrote a book about football titled Le virus du football (The football bug), which was released in 1967.

== Death ==
Höfling died on 18 April 2005 in Bruges, Belgium at the age of 80.

== Honours ==
=== Manager ===
Racing White Brussels

- Belgian Second Division: 1964–65

Club Brugge

- Belgian Cup: 1967–68

Daring Club Brussels

- Belgian Cup runner-up: 1969–70

AS Oostende

- Belgian Third Division: 1972–73
