= Moise Vass =

Romanian footballer

Personal information
- Date of birth: 18 May 1920
- Place of birth: Turda, Romania
- Date of death: 12 November 2005 (aged 85)
- Place of death: Arad, Romania
- Height: 1.75 m (5 ft 9 in)
- Position: Right back

Youth career
- 1935–1940: Cimentul Turda

Senior career*
Years	Team	Apps	(Gls)
1940–1946	Kolozsvári AC	91	(0)
1946–1952	Flamura Roșie Arad	102	(0)
1953	Indagrara Arad		
1954	Constructorul Arad		
1955–1957	Indagrara Arad		
Total		193	(0)

International career
1948	Romania	2	(0)

Managerial career
- 1957–1972: Indagrara Arad
- * Club domestic league appearances and goals

Moise Vass (18 May 1920 – 12 November 2005) was a Romanian footballer who played as a right back. After he ended his playing career, Vass worked as a manager at Indagrara Arad.

== Club career ==
Vass was born on 18 May 1920 in Turda, Romania and began playing football in 1935 at local club Cimentul. In 1940, he went to play for Kolozsvári AC, making his Nemzeti Bajnokság I debut under coach Béla Kovács on 20 August in a 5–1 home win over Salgótarján. Under coach Zoltán Opata, the team reached the 1943–44 Magyar Kupa final and Vass played in both legs of the 5–3 aggregate loss to Ferencváros. On 10 September 1944, he made his last Nemzeti Bajnokság I appearance in a 2–2 draw against Gamma, totaling 91 matches in the competition.

In 1946, Vass went to play for Flamura Roșie Arad, making his Divizia A debut on 25 August under his former coach from Kolozsvári, Zoltán Opata, in a 5–1 away win against Libertatea Oradea. He made 10 appearances in the competition until the end of the season, as the team won the first title in its history. In the following season he helped The Old Lady win The Double, playing 27 league games under coach Petre Steinbach and appearing the entire match under coach Gusztáv Juhász in the 3–2 victory against CFR Timișoara in the 1948 Cupa României final. In the 1950 season, he won another title with the club, being used by coach Francisc Dvorzsák in 22 matches, also appearing in the Cupa României final which was lost with 3–1 to CCA București. On 16 November 1952, Vass made his last Divizia A appearance, playing for Flamura Roșie in a 1–1 draw against Dinamo București, totaling 102 appearances in the competition, all while representing The Old Lady. In 1953 he joined Indagrara Arad, only to move one year later to neighboring club Constructorul. However, in 1955 he returned to Indagrara where he retired in 1957.

== International career ==
Vass played two games for Romania during the 1948 Balkan Cup, making his debut under coach Colea Vâlcov in a 1–0 loss to Albania. The second match was a 3–2 victory against Bulgaria.

== Managerial career ==
Vass coached Indagrara Arad between 1957 and 1972 in the Romanian lower leagues.

== Death ==
Vass died on 12 November 2005 in Arad, Romania at the age of 85.

== Honours ==
Kolozsvári AC

- Magyar Kupa runner-up: 1943–44

Flamura Roșie Arad

- Divizia A: 1946–47, 1947–48, 1950
- Cupa României: 1947–48, runner-up 1950
