= Alexandru Marky =

Romanian footballer

Personal information
- Date of birth: 5 August 1919
- Place of birth: Arad, Romania
- Date of death: 4 December 1969 (aged 50)
- Place of death: Arad, Romania
- Height: 1.70 m (5 ft 7 in)
- Position: Goalkeeper

Youth career
- 1935–1939: SG Arad

Senior career*
Years	Team	Apps	(Gls)
1939–1941	Nyíregyházi TVE		
1942–1944	Kolozsvári AC	53	(0)
1944–1945	BKV Előre	9	(0)
1946–1951	Flamura Roșie Arad	92	(0)
1951–1952	Metalul Steagul Roșu Brașov		
Total		154	(0)

International career
1948–1950	Romania	4	(0)

Managerial career
- 1961–1962: Minerul Lupeni
- * Club domestic league appearances and goals

Alexandru Marky (5 August 1919 – 4 December 1969) was a Romanian football goalkeeper.

== Club career ==
Marky was born on 5 August 1919 in Arad, Romania and began playing football in 1935 at SG Arad. In 1939, he moved to Hungarian side Nyíregyházi TVE. Subsequently, he joined Kolozsvári AC, making his Nemzeti Bajnokság I debut on 20 September 1942 under coach Domonkos János in a 2–0 home loss to Újpest. Under coach Zoltán Opata, the team reached the 1943–44 Magyar Kupa final and Marky played in both legs of the 5–3 aggregate loss to Ferencváros. In 1944, he went to play for BKV Előre where on 24 December 1944, he made his last Nemzeti Bajnokság I appearance by keeping a clean sheet in a 2–0 away win over Szentlőrinci, totaling 62 matches in the competition.

In 1946, Marky went to play for Flamura Roșie Arad, making his Divizia A debut on 25 August under his former coach from Kolozsvári, Zoltán Opata, in a 5–1 away win against Libertatea Oradea. He made 16 appearances in the competition until the end of the season, as the team won the first title in its history. In the following season he helped The Old Lady win The Double, playing 29 league games under coach Petre Steinbach and appearing the entire match under coach Gusztáv Juhász in the 3–2 victory against CFR Timișoara in the 1948 Cupa României final. In the 1950 season, he won another title with the club, being used by coach Francisc Dvorzsák in 20 matches, also appearing in the Cupa României final which was lost with 3–1 to CCA București. On 23 September 1951, Marky made his last Divizia A appearance, playing for Flamura Roșie in a 1–0 home loss to CCA București, totaling 92 appearances in the competition, all while representing The Old Lady. He ended his career after playing during the 1952 Divizia B season for Metalul Steagul Roșu Brașov.

== International career ==
Marky played four matches for Romania, making his debut under coach Colea Vâlcov in a 1–0 loss to Albania in the 1948 Balkan Cup. His following game was during the same competition and he conceded nine goals in the 9–0 loss to rivals Hungary. Marky's last appearance for Romania took place on 21 May 1950 in a 1–1 friendly draw against Czechoslovakia.

== Managerial career ==
Marky coached Minerul Lupeni in Divizia A for 33 matches from 1961 to 1962.

== Death ==
Marky died on 4 December 1969 in his native Arad at the age of 50.

== Honours ==
Kolozsvári AC

- Magyar Kupa runner-up: 1943–44

Flamura Roșie Arad

- Divizia A: 1946–47, 1947–48, 1950
- Cupa României: 1947–48, runner-up 1950
