= Adalbert Pall =

Romanian footballer

Personal information
- Full name: Adalbert Bela Pall
- Date of birth: 1 April 1918
- Place of birth: Cluj-Napoca, Austria-Hungary
- Date of death: 1 August 2001 (aged 83)
- Place of death: Cluj-Napoca, Romania
- Height: 1.82 m (6 ft 0 in)
- Position: Midfielder

Youth career
- 1932–1936: Victoria Cluj

Senior career*
Years	Team	Apps	(Gls)
1936–1940	Victoria Cluj	70	(3)
1940–1946	Kolozsvári AC (Note: The statistics for the 1940–41 Nemzeti Bajnokság II season are unavailable.)	66	(0)
1946–1951	Flamura Roșie Arad	110	(1)
Total		246	(3)

International career
1947–1950	Romania	5	(0)

Managerial career
- 1960: Gloria Bistrița
- Minerul Lupeni
- * Club domestic league appearances and goals

Adalbert Bela Pall (1 April 1918 – 1 August 2001) was a Romanian footballer who played as a midfielder. He was capped 5 times.

== Club career ==
Pall was born on 1 April 1918 in Cluj-Napoca, Austria-Hungary and began playing junior-level football in 1932 at Victoria Cluj. On 30 August 1936, he made his Divizia A debut under coach Sepp Pojar in Victoria's 3–1 home loss to Venus București.

In 1940, Pall went to play for Nemzeti Bajnokság II side Kolozsvári AC, helping the team gain promotion to the first league at the end of the season. Subsequently, he made his Nemzeti Bajnokság I debut under coach Béla Kovács on 24 August 1941 in an 8–1 loss to Szegedi AK. Under coach Zoltán Opata, the team reached the 1943–44 Magyar Kupa final and Pall played in both legs of the 5–3 aggregate loss to Ferencváros. On 3 September 1944, he made his last Nemzeti Bajnokság I appearance in a 1–1 draw against Budapesti MÁVAG, totaling 66 matches in the competition.

In 1946, Pall went to play for Flamura Roșie Arad, making his league debut for them on 25 August under his former coach from Kolozsvári, Zoltán Opata, in a 5–1 away win against Libertatea Oradea. He made 22 appearances in the competition until the end of the season, as the team won the first title in its history. In the following season he helped The Old Lady win The Double, playing 28 league games under coach Petre Steinbach and appearing the entire match under coach Gusztáv Juhász in the 3–2 victory against CFR Timișoara in the 1948 Cupa României final. In the 1950 season, he won another title with the club, being used by coach Francisc Dvorzsák in 22 matches, also appearing in the Cupa României final which was lost with 3–1 to CCA București. On 14 October 1951, Pall made his last Divizia A appearance, playing for Flamura Roșie in a 2–2 draw against Locomotiva București, totaling 180 appearances with four goals in the competition.

== International career ==
Pall played five games for Romania, making his debut under coach Colea Vâlcov on 6 July 1947 in a 3–2 away win over Bulgaria in the 1947 Balkan Cup. He also played in two losses to Albania and rivals Hungary during the 1948 Balkan Cup. Pall's last appearance for the national team took place on 14 May 1950 in a 3–3 friendly draw against Poland.

== Managerial career ==
After his playing career ended, Pall worked as a coach for various teams in Bistrița, Lupeni, Craiova, Turda and Cluj-Napoca.

== Death ==
Pall died on 1 August 2001 in his native Cluj-Napoca at the age of 83.

== Honours ==
Kolozsvári AC

- Magyar Kupa runner-up: 1943–44

Flamura Roșie Arad

- Divizia A: 1946–47, 1947–48, 1950
- Cupa României: 1947–48, runner-up 1950
