= Ferenc Nagy (disambiguation) =

Ferenc Nagy may refer to:

- Ferenc Nagy (1903-1979), Prime Minister of Hungary
- Ferenc Nagy (boxer) (1916-1977), Hungarian Olympic boxer
- Ferenc Nagy (sailor) (born 1956), Hungarian Olympic sailor
- Ferenc Nagy (footballer), Hungarian footballer and coach
- Ferenc József Nagy (1923-2019), Hungarian politician
