= 1950 Cupa României final =

- Event: 1950 Cupa României
CCA București	Flamura Roşie Arad
3	1
- Date: 26 November 1950
- Venue: Republicii, Bucharest
- Referee: Andrei Bölöni (Oraşul Stalin)
- Attendance: 25,000

The 1950 Cupa României final was the 13th final of Romania's most prestigious football cup competition. It was disputed between CCA București and Flamura Roşie Arad, and was won by CCA București after a game with 4 goals. It was the second cup title in the history of CCA București.

== Match details ==
26 November 1950
14:00 EET

CCA București	3–1	Flamura Roşie Arad
Apolzan 44' (pen.); Roman 72'; Moldoveanu 90'	Report	Mercea 89'

Republicii, Bucharest
Attendance: 25,000
Referee: Andrei Bölöni (Oraşul Stalin)

GK	1	(Romania) Ion Voinescu
DF	2	(Romania) Vasile Zavoda
DF	3	(Romania) Alexandru Apolzan
MF	4	(Romania) Ştefan Rodeanu
MF	5	(Romania) Ștefan Balint
MF	6	(Romania) Tiberiu Bone
FW	7	(Romania) Francisc Zavoda
FW	8	(Romania) Nicolae Roman
FW	9	(Romania) Nicolae Drăgan
FW	10	(Romania) Gavril Serfözö
FW	11	(Romania) Petre Moldoveanu
Manager:
(Romania) Francisc Ronnay

GK	1	(Romania) Alexandru Marky
DF	2	(Romania) Moise Vass
DF	3	(Romania) Adalbert Pall
MF	4	(Romania) Zoltan Farmati
MF	5	(Romania) Iosif Petschovski
MF	6	(Romania) Ladislau Băcuț
FW	7	(Romania) Silviu Boitoş
FW	8	(Romania) Andrei Mercea
FW	9	(Romania) Mihai Carpineţ
FW	10	(Romania) Ioan Reinhardt
FW	11	(Romania) Nicolae Dumitrescu
Manager:
(Romania) Francisc Dvorzsák

== See also ==
- List of Cupa României finals
