= 1946–47 Divizia A =

30th season of top-tier football league in Romania

Divizia A
- Season: 1946–47
- Champions: ITA Arad
- Relegated: Prahova Ploiești; FC Craiova
- Matches: 182
- Goals: 771 (4.24 per match)
- Top goalscorer: Ladislau Bonyhádi (26)
- Biggest home win: Carmen 13–0 Prahova
- Biggest away win: FC Craiova 0–7 CFR București; Jiul Petroșani 1–8 CFR București
- Highest scoring: Carmen 13–0 Prahova
- Longest winning run: ITA Arad (6)
- Longest unbeaten run: ITA Arad (11)
- Longest winless run: Prahova (15)
- Longest losing run: FC Craiova (12)

The 1946–47 Divizia A was the thirtieth season of Divizia A, the top-level football league of Romania.

== Teams ==
Divizia A 1946-47 team distribution

== League table ==
| Pos | Team | Pld | W | D | L | GF | GA | GD | Pts | Qualification or relegation |
|---|---|---|---|---|---|---|---|---|---|---|
| 1 | ITA Arad (C) | 26 | 20 | 4 | 2 | 94 | 35 | +59 | 44 | Champions of Romania |
| 2 | Carmen București | 26 | 14 | 5 | 7 | 90 | 44 | +46 | 33 | |
| 3 | CFR Timișoara | 26 | 14 | 5 | 7 | 63 | 57 | +6 | 33 | |
| 4 | Juventus București | 26 | 15 | 2 | 9 | 60 | 37 | +23 | 32 | |
| 5 | CFR București | 26 | 13 | 5 | 8 | 64 | 32 | +32 | 31 | |
| 6 | Ferar Cluj | 26 | 13 | 4 | 9 | 44 | 29 | +15 | 30 | |
| 7 | Ciocanul București | 26 | 12 | 6 | 8 | 57 | 40 | +17 | 30 | |
| 8 | Libertatea Oradea | 26 | 12 | 4 | 10 | 50 | 49 | +1 | 28 | |
| 9 | Universitatea Cluj | 26 | 11 | 3 | 12 | 54 | 47 | +7 | 25 | |
| 10 | Dermagant Târgu Mureș | 26 | 10 | 3 | 13 | 52 | 60 | −8 | 23 | |
| 11 | UD Reșița | 26 | 9 | 4 | 13 | 49 | 64 | −15 | 22 | |
| 12 | Jiul Petroșani | 26 | 7 | 4 | 15 | 39 | 67 | −28 | 18 | |
| 13 | Prahova Ploiești (R) | 26 | 5 | 1 | 20 | 26 | 97 | −71 | 11 | Relegation to Divizia B |
| 14 | FC Craiova (R) | 26 | 2 | 0 | 24 | 23 | 113 | −90 | 4 | Relegation to Divizia B |

Source: LT
Rules for classification: 1) points; 2) goal average; 3) number of goals scored
(C) Champions; (R) Relegated

=== Results ===
| Home \ Away | CFR | CFT | CAR | CIO | DER | CRA | FER | ITA | JIU | JUV | LIB | PRA | UDR | UCJ |
|---|---|---|---|---|---|---|---|---|---|---|---|---|---|---|
| CFR București | — | 2–1 | 1–1 | 1–1 | 2–0 | 10–1 | 2–0 | 1–1 | 2–1 | 0–1 | 3–1 | 4–1 | 2–0 | 0–2 |
| CFR Timișoara | 2–1 | — | 0–3 | 0–0 | 2–1 | 3–1 | 0–0 | 2–6 | 2–0 | 6–0 | 1–3 | 7–3 | 6–2 | 3–2 |
| Carmen | 0–5 | 6–1 | — | 6–2 | 6–1 | 6–0 | 1–0 | 5–2 | 2–2 | 3–3 | 3–3 | 13–0 | 1–1 | 0–1 |
| Ciocanul | 2–0 | 6–0 | 0–6 | — | 0–0 | 5–1 | 1–0 | 1–4 | 5–2 | 0–0 | 3–1 | 6–2 | 5–1 | 1–2 |
| Dermagant | 3–2 | 5–1 | 2–3 | 0–3 | — | 7–1 | 1–0 | 2–5 | 5–1 | 2–0 | 0–0 | 6–0 | 4–2 | 1–1 |
| FC Craiova | 0–7 | 5–7 | 1–5 | 0–1 | 0–1 | — | 2–3 | 0–5 | 0–1 | 0–1 | 1–4 | 0–1 | 7–2 | 1–4 |
| Ferar Cluj | 2–1 | 0–0 | 3–2 | 2–1 | 3–0 | 2–0 | — | 2–3 | 7–0 | 2–1 | 4–1 | 3–0 | 1–0 | 3–0 |
| ITA Arad | 2–2 | 2–2 | 2–1 | 1–0 | 8–4 | 8–0 | 3–1 | — | 4–1 | 2–0 | 5–1 | 1–0 | 6–2 | 4–0 |
| Jiul Petroșani | 1–8 | 0–1 | 1–3 | 3–3 | 7–2 | 4–0 | 1–0 | 1–6 | — | 0–1 | 0–0 | 4–0 | 4–2 | 2–1 |
| Juventus | 5–1 | 3–4 | 5–2 | 3–2 | 3–0 | 4–1 | 2–1 | 2–0 | 3–0 | — | 4–1 | 11–0 | 1–2 | 2–3 |
| Libertatea Oradea | 1–1 | 1–3 | 3–1 | 0–3 | 2–1 | 9–0 | 4–0 | 1–5 | 2–0 | 1–0 | — | 3–1 | 4–0 | 0–3 |
| Prahova Ploiești | 0–3 | 0–3 | 1–6 | 0–2 | 3–1 | 0–1 | 2–2 | 0–3 | 5–1 | 1–3 | 0–2 | — | 3–0 | 3–2 |
| UD Reșița | 3–0 | 3–3 | 3–2 | 3–2 | 4–0 | 6–0 | 0–0 | 1–1 | 3–2 | 0–1 | 3–6 | 4–0 | — | 2–1 |
| U Cluj | 0–3 | 2–3 | 1–3 | 2–2 | 1–3 | 7–0 | 1–3 | 3–5 | 0–0 | 3–1 | 4–2 | 6–0 | 2–0 | — |

Source: LT (in Romanian)
Legend: Blue = home team win; Yellow = draw; Red = away team win.

== Results by round ==
| Team ╲ Round | 1 | 2 | 3 | 4 | 5 | 6 | 7 | 8 | 9 | 10 | 11 | 12 | 13 | 14 | 15 | 16 | 17 | 18 | 19 | 20 | 21 | 22 | 23 | 24 | 25 | 26 |
|---|---|---|---|---|---|---|---|---|---|---|---|---|---|---|---|---|---|---|---|---|---|---|---|---|---|---|
| CFR București | 3 | 1 | 6 | 4 | 6 | 5 | 3 | 2 | 2 | 2 | 2 | 2 | 2 | 2 | 3 | 3 | 2 | 2 | 2 | 3 | 3 | 4 | 4 | 3 | 3 | 5 |
| CFR Timișoara | 5 | 5 | 2 | 2 | 2 | 2 | 2 | 3 | 3 | 6 | 6 | 6 | 5 | 3 | 2 | 4 | 5 | 4 | 7 | 4 | 5 | 6 | 7 | 6 | 2 | 3 |
| Carmen București | 2 | 3 | 5 | 3 | 3 | 3 | 6 | 6 | 5 | 7 | 7 | 9 | 8 | 8 | 7 | 8 | 6 | 8 | 8 | 8 | 6 | 5 | 5 | 4 | 4 | 2 |
| Ciocanul București | 6 | 8 | 4 | 5 | 4 | 6 | 7 | 7 | 7 | 5 | 4 | 3 | 4 | 6 | 6 | 7 | 7 | 5 | 6 | 7 | 4 | 2 | 2 | 5 | 7 | 7 |
| Dermagant Târgu Mureş | 4 | 9 | 10 | 11 | 9 | 10 | 8 | 8 | 8 | 10 | 10 | 11 | 10 | 10 | 10 | 10 | 11 | 11 | 11 | 10 | 11 | 11 | 10 | 10 | 10 | 10 |
| FC Craiova | 12 | 14 | 14 | 14 | 14 | 14 | 14 | 14 | 14 | 14 | 14 | 14 | 14 | 14 | 14 | 14 | 14 | 14 | 14 | 14 | 14 | 14 | 14 | 14 | 14 | 14 |
| Ferar Cluj | 13 | 6 | 8 | 6 | 7 | 8 | 10 | 10 | 10 | 9 | 9 | 8 | 7 | 7 | 8 | 6 | 8 | 7 | 5 | 6 | 8 | 7 | 6 | 7 | 6 | 6 |
| ITA Arad | 1 | 2 | 1 | 1 | 1 | 1 | 1 | 1 | 1 | 1 | 1 | 1 | 1 | 1 | 1 | 1 | 1 | 1 | 1 | 1 | 1 | 1 | 1 | 1 | 1 | 1 |
| Jiul Petroșani | 10 | 13 | 13 | 13 | 13 | 13 | 13 | 13 | 13 | 13 | 11 | 10 | 11 | 11 | 11 | 12 | 12 | 12 | 12 | 12 | 12 | 12 | 12 | 12 | 12 | 12 |
| Juventus București | 8 | 7 | 3 | 7 | 8 | 7 | 5 | 5 | 4 | 3 | 5 | 4 | 3 | 4 | 4 | 2 | 3 | 3 | 3 | 2 | 2 | 3 | 3 | 2 | 5 | 4 |
| Libertatea Oradea | 11 | 12 | 12 | 10 | 10 | 11 | 9 | 9 | 9 | 8 | 8 | 7 | 9 | 9 | 9 | 9 | 9 | 9 | 9 | 9 | 9 | 9 | 9 | 8 | 8 | 8 |
| Prahova Ploiești | 7 | 4 | 7 | 9 | 11 | 9 | 11 | 11 | 11 | 11 | 12 | 12 | 13 | 13 | 13 | 13 | 13 | 13 | 13 | 13 | 13 | 13 | 13 | 13 | 13 | 13 |
| UD Reșița | 9 | 11 | 11 | 12 | 12 | 12 | 12 | 12 | 12 | 12 | 13 | 13 | 12 | 12 | 12 | 11 | 10 | 10 | 10 | 11 | 10 | 10 | 11 | 11 | 11 | 11 |
| Universitatea Cluj | 14 | 10 | 9 | 8 | 5 | 4 | 4 | 4 | 6 | 4 | 3 | 5 | 6 | 5 | 5 | 5 | 4 | 6 | 4 | 5 | 7 | 8 | 8 | 9 | 9 | 9 |

Source: LT (in Romanian)

== Top goalscorers ==
| Rank | Player | Club | Goals |
|---|---|---|---|
| 1 | Ladislau Bonyhádi | ITA Arad | 26 |
| 2 | Iosif Kovács | Carmen București | 24 |
| 3 | Norberto Höfling | Ciocanul București | 22 |
| 4 | Bazil Marian | Carmen București | 20 |
| 5 | Ioan Palfi | Dermagant Târgu Mureş | 19 |
| 5 | Gheorghe Váczi | Ferar Cluj | 19 |
| 5 | Mihai Zsizsik | UD Reșița | 19 |

== Champion squad ==
ITA Arad

Goalkeepers: Alexandru Marky (16 / 0); Justin Apostol (10 / 0).
Defenders: Adalbert Pall (22 / 0); Gyula Lóránt (Hungary) (21 / 0); Iosif Slivăț (10 / 0); Moise Vass (10 / 0).
Midfielders: Francisc Mészáros (13 / 1); Ioan Reinhardt (24 / 2); Mircea Tudose (6 / 0); Gheorghe Băcuț (24 / 1).
Forwards: Ioan Nicșa (14 / 5); Andrei Mercea (17 / 4); Ladislau Bonyhádi (23 / 26); Adalbert Kovács (13 / 13); József Pecsovszky (22 / 12); Nicolae Dumitrescu (10 / 10); Mátyás Tóth (24 / 13); Kostas Choumis (1 / 0); Iosif Stibinger (6 / 4).
(league appearances and goals listed in brackets)

Manager: Zoltán Opata (Hungary) / Zoltán Blum (Hungary) / Gusztáv Juhász.

== See also ==
- 1946–47 Divizia B
