= Andrei Mercea =

Romanian footballer

Personal information
- Date of birth: 16 March 1925
- Place of birth: Arad, Romania
- Date of death: 24 January 2002 (aged 76)
- Height: 1.68 m (5 ft 6 in)
- Position: Forward

Youth career
- 1937: SG Arad
- 1937–1946: Gloria Arad

Senior career*
| Years | Team | Apps | (Gls) |
| 1946–1948 | ITA Arad | 42 | (16) |
| 1948–1949 | CSCA București | 23 | (6) |
| 1950–1958 | UTA Arad (Note: The 1957 championship called Cupa Primăverii is unofficial, so the appearances and goals scored at that competition for UTA Arad are not official.) | 165 | (35) |
| 1958–1961 | AMEF Arad | | |
| 1961 | Teba Arad | | |
| Total | | 230 | (57) |

International career
| 1948–1952 | Romania | 6 | (2) |
- * Club domestic league appearances and goals

Andrei Mercea (16 March 1925 – 24 January 2002) was a Romanian football forward.

== Club career ==
Mercea was born on 16 March 1925 in Arad, Romania and began playing junior-level football at local clubs SG Arad and Gloria Arad. He started his senior career, making his Divizia A debut under coach Zoltán Opata on 15 September 1946, playing for ITA Arad in a 8–4 victory against Dermagant Târgu Mureș. Until the end of the season, he made a total of 17 appearances in which he scored four goals that helped the club win the title. In the following season, he won The Double, scoring 12 goals in the 25 games he was used by coach Petre Steinbach, but he did not play in the 3–2 victory against CFR Timișoara in the 1948 Cupa României final. In 1948 he joined CSCA București where on 21 November 1948, coach Colea Vâlcov used him in the first ever CSCA București – Dinamo București derby that ended with a 1–0 loss. After one season, Mercea returned to UTA, winning the 1950 Divizia A title, being used by coach Francisc Dvorzsák in 22 matches in which he scored 12 goals, and he also scored in the 3–1 loss to CCA București in the Cupa României final. He helped The Old Lady win the 1953 Cupa României, playing the entire match under coach Coloman Braun-Bogdan in the 1–0 victory against CCA București in the final. Afterwards, Braun-Bogdan used him in 24 matches in which he scored once in the 1954 Divizia A season when Mercea and the club won the fourth title together. He made his last Divizia A appearance on 15 June 1958, playing in UTA's 2–1 victory against Rapid București, totaling 230 matches with 57 goals in the competition. Among these goals, five were scored in the West derby against Politehnica Timișoara, contributing to three victories and one draw for UTA. Mercea spent the last years of his career playing for AMEF Arad and Teba Arad in the Romanian lower leagues.

== International career ==
Mercea played six matches and scored two goals for Romania, making his debut on 6 June 1948 under coach Petre Steinbach in a 9–0 loss to Hungary in the 1948 Balkan Cup. He played two more games in the same competition, a 2–1 win over Czechoslovakia and a goalless draw against Poland. His two goals were scored in friendlies against Albania and Poland. Mercea made his last appearance on 25 May 1952 in a 1–0 friendly victory against Poland. He was part of Romania's squad for the 1952 Summer Olympics.

=== International goals ===
Scores and results list Romania's goal tally first, score column indicates score after each Mercea goal.

List of international goals scored by Andrei Mercea
| # | Date | Venue | Cap | Opponent | Score | Result | Competition |
|---|---|---|---|---|---|---|---|
| 1 | 14 May 1950 | Stadion Olimpijski, Wrocław, Poland | 4 | Poland | 1–0 | 3–3 | Friendly |
| 2 | 8 October 1950 | Stadionul Republicii, Bucharest, Romania | 5 | Albania | 3–0 | 6–0 | Friendly |

== Death ==
Mercea died on 24 January 2002 at age 76. A book about him was written by Radu Romănescu, titled Andrei Mercea – Campionul care desena inimi (Andrei Mercea – The champion that drew hearts), and was released on 18 April 2018.

== Honours ==
UTA Arad

- Divizia A: 1946–47, 1947–48, 1950, 1954
- Cupa României: 1947–48, 1953, runner-up 1950
