= Zoltan Farmati =

Romanian footballer

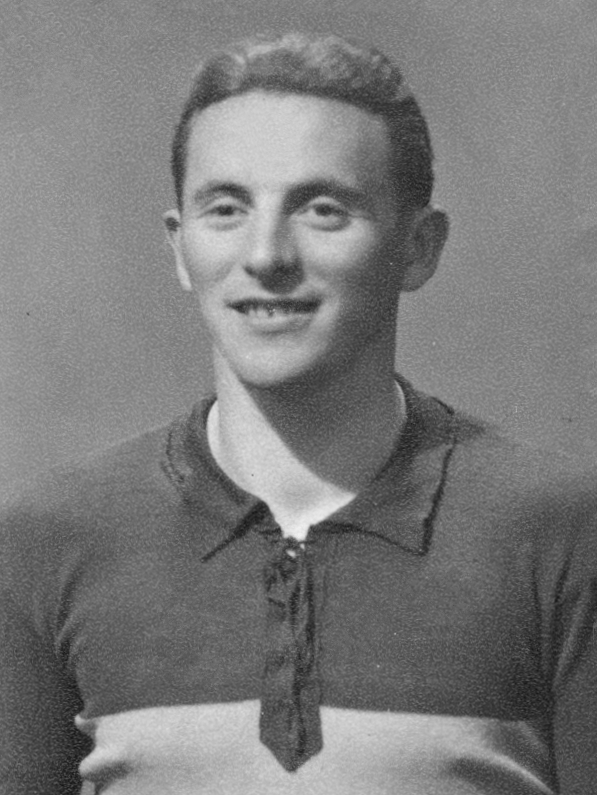

Personal information
- Date of birth: 9 July 1924
- Place of birth: Șimleu Silvaniei, Romania
- Date of death: 3 January 2006 (aged 81)
- Place of death: Ghioroc, Romania
- Height: 1.74 m (5 ft 9 in)
- Position: Defender

Senior career*
Years	Team	Apps	(Gls)
1943–1945	Ferar Cluj (Note: Including two games played in the Nemzeti Bajnokság I where the club played before 1945 under the name Kolozsvár AC.)	26	(0)
1946–1959	UTA Arad (Note: The 1957 championship called Cupa Primăverii is unofficial, so the appearances and goals scored at that competition for UTA Arad are not official.)	193	(10)
Total		219	(10)

International career
1947–1953	Romania	21	(0)
- * Club domestic league appearances and goals

Zoltan Farmati (Hungarian: Farmati Zoltán; 9 July 1924 – 3 January 2006) was a Romanian association football defender. Between 1947 and 1953 he played 21 matches for the national team, including one at the 1952 Summer Olympics. Domestically he spent the majority of his career with UTA Arad, winning with them three national titles and two cups.

== Club career ==
Farmati, nicknamed Bimbo, was born on 9 July 1924 in Șimleu Silvaniei, Romania, and was the eldest of eight brothers. He began playing football in 1942 at CA Cluj in the Hungarian league, a competition in which he made two appearances. In 1946, the club was renamed Ferar and started to play in the Romanian league where he made his debut on 25 August 1946 under coach Iuliu Bodola in a 1–0 away loss to Ciocanul București. After one season, Farmati joined UTA Arad, helping them win The Double in his first season, being used by coach Petre Steinbach in 26 matches in which he scored a personal record of nine goals. He also played in the 3–2 victory in the 1948 Cupa României final against CFR Timișoara. In the 1950 Divizia A season, Farmati won another title with the club, being used by coach Francisc Dvorzsák in 23 matches in which he did not score. In the same season he appeared in the 1950 Cupa României final which was lost with 3–1 to CCA București. Farmati helped The Old Lady win the 1953 Cupa României, being used the entire match by coach Coloman Braun-Bogdan in the 1–0 victory against CCA București in the final. Braun-Bogdan also gave him 23 appearances in the 1954 Divizia A season when he won his third title with the club. On 19 November 1958, Farmati played his last Divizia A match in UTA's 3–1 home victory against Petrolul Ploiești, totaling 217 games with 10 goals in the competition.

== International career ==
Farmati played 21 games for Romania, making his debut under coach Colea Vâlcov in a 3–1 home loss to Yugoslavia in the 1947 Balkan Cup. His following game was a 3–2 win over Bulgaria in the same competition. Subsequently, he made five appearances in the 1948 Balkan Cup. He was selected by coach Gheorghe Popescu to play in the 1952 Summer Olympics, appearing in the 2–1 loss in the first round against eventual champions Hungary. Farmati's last two matches played for the national team were an away loss to Czechoslovakia and a home win against Bulgaria in the 1954 World Cup qualifiers.

== Later life and death ==
Farmati worked at UTA's center for children and juniors and also served as an assistant several times for the team's senior squad.

He died on 3 January 2006 at age 81.

A book about Farmati was written by Radu Romănescu and Ionel Costin titled Zoltan Farmati – Cavalerul de la brațul Bătrânei Doamne (Zoltan Farmati – The Knight from the Old Lady's Arm), which was released in 2017.

== Honours ==
UTA Arad

- Divizia A: 1947–48, 1950, 1954
- Cupa României: 1947–48, 1953, runner-up 1950
