= Árpád Székely =

Hungarian diplomat

Árpád Székely was the Ambassador Extraordinary and Plenipotentiary of the Republic of Hungary to the Russian Federation.

== See also ==
- Embassy of Hungary in Moscow
- György Gilyán, the current Ambassador
