= János Börzsei =

Hungarian footballer (1921–2007)

Personal information
- Full name: János Börzsei
- Date of birth: 9 October 1921
- Place of birth: Budapest, Hungary
- Date of death: 30 August 2007 (aged 85)
- Place of death: Budapest, Hungary
- Position: Defender

Youth career
- 1933–1941: III. Kerületi TUE

Senior career*
Years	Team	Apps	(Gls)
1942–1945	Elektromos	49	(0)
1946	Ferar Cluj	5	(0)
1946–1957	MTK Budapest	262	(1)

International career
1948–1956	Hungary	22	(0)
- * Club domestic league appearances and goals

János Börzsei (9 October 1921 – 30 August 2007) was a former Hungarian footballer. He won a gold medal with the Hungary national team at the 1952 Summer Olympics in Helsinki, Finland, but he did not play in any matches.

== Honours ==
MTK Budapest

- Nemzeti Bajnokság I: 1951, 1953, 1957–58
