= 1950 Divizia A =

33rd season of top-tier football league in Romania

Divizia A
- Season: 1950
- Champions: Flamura Roşie Arad
- Top goalscorer: Andrei Rădulescu (18)

The 1950 Divizia A was the thirty-third season of Divizia A, the top-level football league of Romania.

== Teams ==
Location of teams in 1950 Divizia A

== League table ==
Pos	Team	Pld	W	D	L	GF	GA	GD	Pts	Qualification or relegation
1	Flamura Roșie Arad (C)	22	11	6	5	43	27	+16	28	Champions of Romania
2	Locomotiva București	22	11	6	5	43	33	+10	28	
3	Știința Timișoara	22	9	7	6	30	37	−7	25	
4	Locomotiva Timișoara	22	11	2	9	40	28	+12	24	
5	CCA București	22	8	8	6	37	26	+11	24	
6	Partizanul Petroșani	22	7	8	7	39	38	+1	22	
7	ICO Oradea	22	8	6	8	32	34	−2	22	
8	Dinamo București	22	9	3	10	40	45	−5	21	
9	Locomotiva Târgu Mureș	22	6	6	10	32	38	−6	18	
10	Partizanul București	22	5	8	9	39	49	−10	18	
11	Metalul Reșița (R)	22	6	6	10	38	48	−10	18	Relegation to Divizia B
12	Locomotiva Sibiu (R)	22	4	8	10	28	38	−10	16	Relegation to Divizia B

Source: LT
Rules for classification: 1) points; 2) goal average; 3) number of goals scored
(C) Champions; (R) Relegated

=== Results ===
Home \ Away	CCA	DIN	FRA	ORA	LBU	SIB	LTI	TÂR	REȘ	PAR	PET	ȘTI
CCA București	—	0–1	0–2	3–1	1–0	0–1	1–1	2–0	2–0	1–1	1–2	5–1
Dinamo București	2–2	—	1–3	0–2	3–5	2–1	4–2	3–2	2–1	2–2	5–3	2–3
Flamura Roșie Arad	1–1	2–0	—	2–1	1–3	5–3	0–0	7–1	2–1	3–0	2–2	4–0
ICO Oradea	2–1	1–0	2–1	—	2–1	4–1	0–3	3–1	2–2	2–2	2–2	2–3
Locomotiva București	2–4	4–2	1–1	2–0	—	4–3	1–0	2–2	4–3	1–0	1–1	3–1
Locomotiva Sibiu	0–3	2–1	0–1	2–0	2–3	—	0–2	1–1	4–2	1–1	0–1	0–0
Locomotiva Timișoara	3–2	1–3	2–0	0–1	1–0	2–1	—	1–0	4–1	7–3	5–0	0–1
Locomotiva Târgu Mureș	0–0	2–0	1–2	0–0	2–2	2–2	2–0	—	3–1	4–1	3–2	4–0
Metalul Reșița	2–2	2–0	0–0	3–1	2–3	2–2	2–1	2–1	—	2–1	3–1	1–1
Partizanul București	2–2	3–4	2–2	1–1	1–0	1–1	3–2	3–1	4–3	—	5–2	2–3
Partizanul Petroșani	1–1	0–0	4–1	2–1	1–1	0–0	2–3	3–0	6–1	3–0	—	0–2
Știința Timișoara	1–3	2–3	2–1	2–2	0–0	1–1	1–0	1–0	2–2	2–1	1–1	—

Source: LT (in Romanian)
Legend: Blue = home team win; Yellow = draw; Red = away team win.

== Top goalscorers ==
Rank	Player	Club	Goals
1	Andrei Rădulescu	Locomotiva București	18
2	Petre Bădeanțu	Locomotiva Timișoara	15
3	Tudor Paraschiva	Partizanul Petroșani	14
3	Constantin Titi Popescu	Dinamo București	14
5	Andrei Mercea	Flamura Roșie Arad	12
5	Mihai Zsizsik	Metalul Reșița	12

== Champion squad ==
Flamura Roșie Arad

Goalkeepers: Alexandru Marky (20 / 0); Ioan Catranici (8 / 0).
Defenders: Moise Vass (22 / 0); Zoltan Farmati (20 / 0); Adalbert Țipei (2 / 0).
Midfielders: Ioan Reinhardt (22 / 4); Adalbert Pall (22 / 0); Ladislau Băcuț (22 / 0).
Forwards: Silviu Boitoș (20 / 5); Andrei Mercea (22 / 12); Mihai Carpineț (20 / 6); Virgil Huzum (19 / 8); Iosif Kapas (11 / 2); József Pecsovszky (16 / 5); Adalbert Kovács (3 / 0); Nicolae Dumitrescu (15 / 0); Ladislau Ristin (1 / 0).
(league appearances and goals listed in brackets)

Manager: Francisc Dvorzsák.

== See also ==
- 1950 Divizia B
