= István Szalay =

Hungarian mathematician and politician (1944–2022)

Member of the National Assembly of Hungary
- In office 1998–2002

Personal details
- Born: 22 March 1944 Hegykő, Hungary
- Died: 1 September 2022 (aged 78)
- Party: MSZP
- Education: University of Szeged
- Occupation: Mathematician

István Szalay (22 March 1944 – 1 September 2022) was a Hungarian mathematician and politician. A member of the Hungarian Socialist Party, he served in the National Assembly from 1998 to 2002. Prior to that, he was mayor of Szeged from 1994 to 1998.

Szalay died on 1 September 2022, at the age of 78.
