= Anton Fernbach-Ferenczi =

Romanian footballer

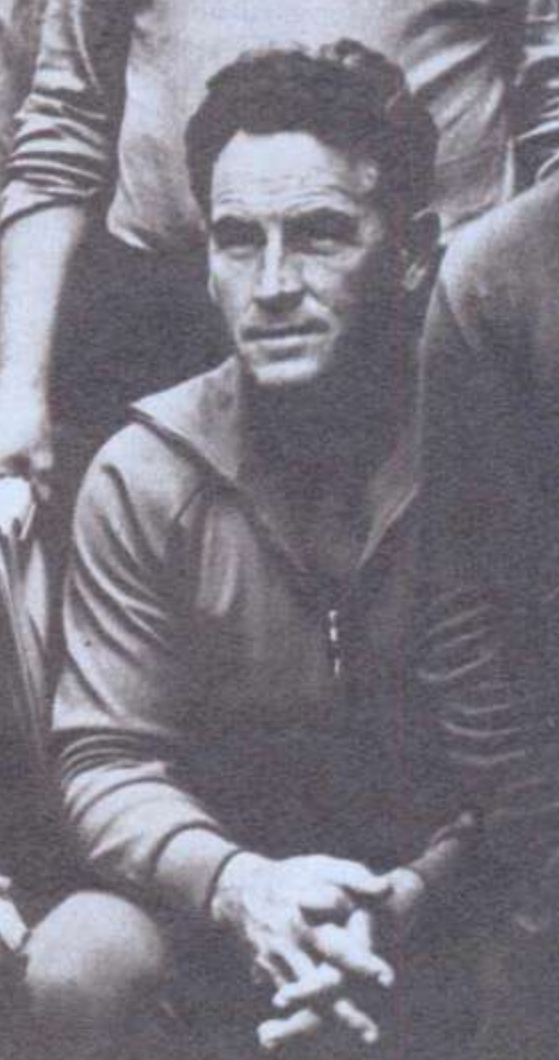

Personal information
- Date of birth: 4 March 1925
- Place of birth: Oradea, Romania
- Date of death: 1 January 1989 (aged 63)
- Place of death: Oradea, Romania
- Position: Forward

Senior career*
Years	Team	Apps	(Gls)
1941–1942	Kolozsvári AC	6	(0)
1943–1944	Nagyváradi AC	3	(0)
1945	Ganz-MÁVAG SE	3	(1)
1945–1946	Karres Mediaș		
1946–1947	Ferar Cluj	16	(8)
1947–1949	CFR Cluj	44	(18)
1949–1951	CCA București	27	(7)
1952–1956	Locomotiva București (Note: The statistics for the 1952 and 1955 Divizia B seasons are unavailable.)	53	(6)
1957–1962	CS Oradea	34	(1)
Total		186	(41)

International career
1948	Romania	1	(0)

Managerial career
- 1967–1969: Crișul Oradea
- 1970–1972: Bihor Oradea (youth)
- 1972–1974: Bihor Oradea
- 1974–1985: Bihor Oradea (youth)
- 1988: Olimpia Salonta
- * Club domestic league appearances and goals

Anton Fernbach-Ferenczi (also known as Antal Ferenczi; 4 March 1925 – 1989*) was a Romanian football forward and manager. He scored the winning goal in the 2–1 victory against CSU Cluj in the 1949 Cupa României final, which helped CCA București win the first Cupa României in the club's history.

== International career ==
Fernbach-Ferenczi played one game at international level for Romania in a 5–1 loss against Hungary at the 1948 Balkan Cup.

== Death* ==
His death date is missing, but according to the statements of some people who knew him, he was the manager of Olimpia Salonta in the late 1980s (1988 most probably). After half of the season, he left the club and died at short time after (within a year). Fernbach-Ferenczi probably died somewhere between 1988 and 1989.

== Honours ==
Nagyváradi AC

- Nemzeti Bajnokság I: 1943–44

CCA București

- Divizia A: 1951
- Cupa României: 1948–49, 1950, 1951

Locomotiva București

- Divizia B: 1952, 1955
