= György Gilyán =

Hungarian diplomat (born 1951)

György Gilyán (left)
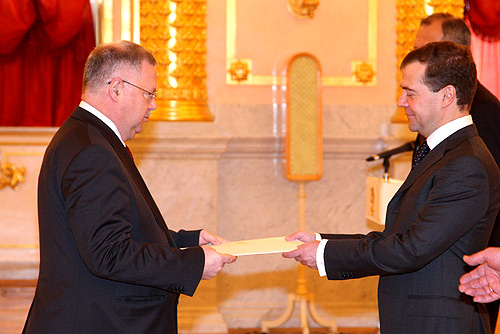

György Gilyán (born. 4 October 1951) is a Hungarian diplomat and the Ambassador Extraordinary and Plenipotentiary of Hungary to the Russian Federation. He previously served as Hungary's State Secretary (2006–2008). During his time in that office, Hungary opened an embassy to Belarus.
