= Ladislau Bonyhádi =

Romanian football player of Hungarian ethnicity

Personal information
- Full name: Ladislau Ludovic Bonyhádi
- Date of birth: 25 March 1923
- Place of birth: Bonyhád, Hungary
- Date of death: 13 June 1997 (aged 74)
- Place of death: Miami, Florida, United States
- Position: Striker

Youth career
- 1934–1938: Szegedi

Senior career*
Years	Team	Apps	(Gls)
1938–1940	Szegedi (Note: Only the statistics for the 1940–41 Nemzeti Bajnokság I season are available.)	2	(0)
1941–1945	Kolozsvári AC	65	(39)
1946–1949	ITA Arad	54	(80)
Total		121	(119)

International career
1947–1948	Romania	3	(0)
- * Club domestic league appearances and goals

Ladislau Ludovic Bonyhádi (Hungarian: Bonyhádi László; 25 March 1923 – 13 June 1997) was a Romanian football player of Hungarian ethnicity. During his spell with ITA Arad he was the top-scorer of Divizia A twice, in the 1947–48 season he scored 49 goals, which is a record for the Romanian first league.

== Club career ==
Bonyhádi was born on 25 March 1923 in Bonyhád, Hungary and began playing junior-level football at age 11 in 1934 at Szegedi. Four years later he started to play for the team's senior squad. In 1941 he went to play for Kolozsvári AC, his first Nemzeti Bajnokság I match for them being on 31 August when under the guidance of coach Béla Kovács he scored a brace in a 3–0 win over Diósgyőri MÁVAG. Until the end of the season Bonyhádi scored 22 goals, including four more doubles against Csepel, Nagyváradi AC, Kispest AC and Gamma, and a hat-trick in a 3–3 draw against Elektromos. In the following season he scored 11 goals, including two doubles in two wins over Salgótarjáni BTC and Újvidéki AC. In his last season at the club, Bonyhádi netted six league goals, including a brace in a 4–0 win over Elektromos. Under coach Zoltán Opata, the team reached the 1943–44 Magyar Kupa final which was lost with 5–3 on aggregate to Ferencváros, where he scored all three goals of his side.

In 1946 he went to play for ITA Arad, making his Divizia A debut on 25 August under his former coach from Kolozsvári, Zoltán Opata, in a 5–1 away win against Libertatea Oradea. By the end of the season, he scored 26 goals in 23 matches, being the league's top-scorer as the team won the first title in its history. In the following season he helped The Old Lady win The Double, being the league's top-scorer once again with 49 goals netted in the 29 games under coach Petre Steinbach, also playing the entire match under coach Gusztáv Juhász in the 3–2 victory against CFR Timișoara in the 1948 Cupa României final. With those 49 goals, Bonyhádi holds the record of most goals scored in a single Divizia A season by a player. In all the European championships that season, only Ferenc Puskás surpassed him, as he scored 50 goals in the Hungarian league. In the 1948–49 season he made six appearances in which he scored five goals for UTA, with the last two goals coming in a 3–3 draw against CSCA București, totaling 54 games with 80 goals in the Romanian league.

In 1948, Bonyhádi's father, Geza asked him to come to Budapest because he was very ill and wanted to see his son once more. As Romania's communist regime did not allow anyone to cross the border, Bonyhádi left the country illegally. However, returning proved impossible due to heightened border security, and capture would have resulted in jail time. Consequently, he was forced to remain in Hungary, losing contact with his wife. Furthermore, his "runaway" status prevented him from joining a team, leading to his retirement from professional football at age 24, though he continued to play handball for a while.

== International career ==
Although born in Hungary, Bonyhádi played three games for Romania, making his debut on 26 October 1947 when coach Ferenc Rónay sent him at half-time to replace Gheorghe Váczi in a 0–0 friendly draw against Poland. His following games were losses in the 1948 Balkan Cup, a 0–1 to Albania and a 0–9 to Hungary.

== Style of play ==
Bonyhádi was described in a press report from July 1946 as a strong player who could pass the opponents defense with his physical force, being known to shoot equally powerfully with both legs. He was also known for his speed, at a point reaching 11.2 seconds in a 100 meters sprint, in one year winning a running competition in Arad.

== Death ==
Bonyhádi fled from Hungary's communist regime during the Hungarian Revolution of 1956, settling in the United States. He died on 13 June 1997 at age 74 in Miami, Florida.

A book about Bonyhádi was written by Radu Romănescu titled Ludovic Bonyhádi, marele golgeter al Aradului. Povestea neștiută (Ludovic Bonyhádi, the great goalscorer of Arad. The unknown story), which was released on 15 April 2016.

== Honours ==
Kolozsvári AC

- Magyar Kupa runner-up: 1943–44

UTA Arad

- Divizia A: 1946–47, 1947–48
- Cupa României: 1947–48

Individual

- Divizia A top scorer: 1946–47, 1947–48
- Most goals scored in a single Divizia A season: 49 (1947–48)
