= Ferar Cluj =

- Full name: Ferar Cluj / Kolozsvári Vasas
- Short name: Ferar / Vasas
- Founded: 1880; as Kolozsvári Atlétikai Club (Club Atletic Cluj)
- Dissolved: 1948
- Ground: Ferar
Home colours

Ferar Cluj (Hungarian: Kolozsvári Vasas) was a football club from Kolozsvár/Cluj that played both in the Hungarian and the Romanian Championship.

== History ==
Founded in 1880 as Kolozsvári Atlétikai Club, the football section was founded in 1904 and the team first entered the Hungarian second league in 1907–1908 season. The team participated in the Eastern District of the second Hungarian league. After being runner-up three times in 1907–1908, 1908–09 and 1911–12, they finally became district champions in the 1913–14 season, even though the season was discontinued due to the beginning of World War I.

After the World War I, the city of Kolozsvár/Cluj became part of Romania, and from this time it participated in the Romanian league system. The club played in the Romanian regional championship until 1934 when it was promoted to Divizia B. It spent 2 seasons there until its 1938 relegation.

During World War II, the club played in the Hungarian National Championship and finished 3rd in the 1943–44 season. Some players used were Márky – Vass, Pall – Balint, Reinhardt, Z. Szaniszló – Fábián I, Ș. Kovács IV, L. Bonyhádi, Fülöp, and Incze II. In 1945, Ferar changed its name to Ferar KMSE, having in its midst a number of valuable players including Márky, Szoboszlay, Vass, Demeter, Z. Szaniszló, Fülöp, I. Petschovsky, Mészáros, Kovács V, Ș. Kovács IV, Pall, Reinhardt, Fábián I, L. Bonyhádi, and Blejan.

At the first postbelic season, 1946–47, under the name of Ferar, a number of players were added: Boldizsár, Farmati, Börzsei, Fuzer, Váczi, and Fernbach-Ferenczi.

In 1948, the club merged with CFR Cluj and disappeared from all records.

== Honours ==
Liga I:

- Winners (0):, Best finish: 6th 1946–47

Hungarian National Championship I:

- Winners (0):, Best finish: 3rd 1943–44

Hungarian National Championship II:

- Winners (0):, Best finish: 3rd 1940–41

Transylvanian League

- Winners (2): 1913–14, 1940–41
- Runners-up (3): 1907–08, 1908–09, 1911–12

Hungarian Cup:

- Runner-up (1): 1943–44

== Domestic record ==
=== Key ===
- Pos = Final position
- P = Played
- W = Games won
- D = Games drawn
- L = Games lost
- GF = Goals For
- GA = Goals Against
- Pts = Points
- Div A = Liga I
- Div B = Liga II
- Div C = Liga III
- Nem I = Nemzeti Bajnokság I
- Nem II = Nemzeti Bajnokság II
- Ch. Tr. = Championship of Transylvania
- p = Preliminary Round
- 1R = Round 1
- 2R = Round 2
- 3R = Round 3
- 4R = Round 4
- 5R = Round 5
- GS = Group stage
- R32 = Round of 32
- QF = Quarter-finals
- R16 = Round of 16
- SF = Semi-finals
- F = Final

Champions	Runners-up	Third place	Promoted	Relegated

The players in bold were the top goalscorers in the division.

=== Seasons ===
Season	League									Cup	European Cup	Other	Top Goalscorer(s)		Notes	Name
Season	**Division**	**Pos**	**P**	**W**	**D**	**L**	**GF**	**GA**	**Pts**	Cup	European Cup	Other	**Name**	**Goals**	Notes	Name
Hungarian Football Championship																Kolozsvári Atlétikai Club / Clubul Atletic Cluj
**1907–08**	District	2nd	4	3	0	1	15	5	**6**	–						Kolozsvári Atlétikai Club / Clubul Atletic Cluj
**1908–09**	District	2nd	8	5	1	2	16	12	**11**	–						Kolozsvári Atlétikai Club / Clubul Atletic Cluj
1909–10 Not involved in any competitions																Kolozsvári Atlétikai Club / Clubul Atletic Cluj
**1910–11**	Ch. Tr.	3rd	4	0	0	4	1	7	**0**	–						Kolozsvári Atlétikai Club / Clubul Atletic Cluj
**1911–12**	Ch. Tr.	2nd	6	4	0	2			**8**	–						Kolozsvári Atlétikai Club / Clubul Atletic Cluj
**1912–13**	Ch. Tr.	3rd	12	7	1	4			**15**	–						Kolozsvári Atlétikai Club / Clubul Atletic Cluj
**1913–14**	Ch. Tr.	**1st**	20						**35**	–					Championship discontinued	Kolozsvári Atlétikai Club / Clubul Atletic Cluj
1914–18 Not involved in any competitions due to World War I. In 1918, Transylvania is united with Romania.																Kolozsvári Atlétikai Club / Clubul Atletic Cluj
**1918–19**	District		6							–						Kolozsvári Atlétikai Club / Clubul Atletic Cluj
**1919–20**	District									–						Kolozsvári Atlétikai Club / Clubul Atletic Cluj
**1920–21**	District									–						Kolozsvári Atlétikai Club / Clubul Atletic Cluj
Romanian Football Championship																CA Cluj
**1921–22**	District		7							–						CA Cluj
**1922–23**	District									–						CA Cluj
**1923–24**	District									–						CA Cluj
**1924–25**	District		14							–						CA Cluj
**1925–26**	District		18							–						CA Cluj
**1926–27**	District		10							–						CA Cluj
**1927–28**	District									–						CA Cluj
**1928–29**	District									–						CA Cluj
**1929–30**	District									–						CA Cluj
**1930–31**	District									–						CA Cluj
**1931–32**	District									–						CA Cluj
**1932–33**	District									–					Foundation of the Romanian Football; League system	CA Cluj
**1933–34**	District									p						CA Cluj
**1934–35**	Div B	7th	14	4	1	9	18	30	**9**	p						CA Cluj
**1935–36**	Div B	5th	14	5	2	7	21	28	**12**	p						CA Cluj
**1936–37**	Div C	3rd	10	2	7	1	15	12	**11**	p						CA Cluj
**1937–38**	Div C	3rd	16	9	4	3	39	19	**22**	p						CA Cluj
**1938–39**	Div C									p						CA Cluj
**1939–40**	Div C									p						CA Cluj
**1940–41**	Div C	–	–	–	–	–	–	–	–	–			–	–	Retired due to Second Vienna Award	CA Cluj
Hungarian Football Championship																Kolozsvári Atlétikai Club
**1940–41**	Nem II	3rd	10	4	1	5	29	27	**9**	p						Kolozsvári Atlétikai Club
**1941–42**	**Nem I**	13th	30	8	6	16	51	78	**22**	p						Kolozsvári Atlétikai Club
**1942–43**	**Nem I**	10th	30	11	4	15	60	70	**26**	p						Kolozsvári Atlétikai Club
**1943–44**	**Nem I**	3rd	30	15	6	9	54	45	**36**	F						Kolozsvári Atlétikai Club
**1944–45**	**Nem I**	8th	3	1	2	0	5	3	**4**	–			–	–	Retired – Vienna Award nullified	Kolozsvári Atlétikai Club
Romanian Football Championship																Ferar Cluj
**1945–46**	District	**1st**								–						Ferar Cluj
**1946–47**	**Div A**	6th	26	13	4	9	44	29	**30**	–			(Romania) Gheorghe Váczi	19		Ferar Cluj
**1947–48**	**Div A**	14th	15	3	4	8	21	33	**10**	R16			(Romania) Anton Fernbach-Ferenczi	15	Merged with CFR Cluj during the Season	Ferar Cluj

== Coach history ==
- (Romania) (Hungary) Nicolae Kovács (1947)
