= Zoltán Szaniszló =

Association football player (1910–1959)

Personal information
- Date of birth: 20 August 1910
- Date of death: 10 October 1959 (aged 49)
- Height: 1.79 m (5 ft 10 in)
- Position: Midfielder

Senior career*
Years	Team	Apps	(Gls)
1932–1934	Hungária		
1934–1940	AMEF Arad	112	(6)
1940–1944	Kolozsvári AC	91	(0)
1945–1948	Ferar Cluj	55	(0)
Total		258	(6)

International career
1932	Hungary	1	(0)
1935–1938	Romania	5	(0)
- * Club domestic league appearances and goals

Zoltán Szaniszló (20 August 1910 – 10 October 1959) was a footballer who played international football for both Hungary and Romania. He played as a midfielder for Hungária, AMEF Arad and Ferar Cluj.
