= Ladislau Incze II =

Romanian footballer

Personal information
- Date of birth: 17 October 1918
- Place of birth: Marosvásárhely, Austria-Hungary
- Date of death: 1999 (aged 51)
- Place of death: Târgu Mureș, Romania
- Position: Forward

Senior career*
Years	Team	Apps	(Gls)
1927–1940	Mureșul Târgu Mureș		
1937	→ Klinger Sfântu Gheorghe (loan)		
1940–1943	Nagyváradi AC	9	(2)
1943–1953	Locomotiva Târgu Mureș	147	(59)
Total		156	(61)

International career^{‡}
1945–1948	Romania	4	(0)

Managerial career
- 1956–1957: Mureșul Luduș
- 1958–1960: CS Târgu Mureș
- 1961: Rapid Târgu Mureș
- 1962: Alimentara Târgu Mureș
- 1963–1964: Mureșul Luduș
- * Club domestic league appearances and goals as of 6 November 2019 ‡ National team caps and goals as of 6 November 2019

Ladislau "László" Incze II (17 October 1918 – 1999) was a Romanian footballer of Hungarian descent who played as a forward for teams such as Mureșul Târgu Mureș, Nagyváradi AC or Locomotiva Târgu Mureș, among others.

Ladislau Incze II was part of a family of athletes, his brothers Incze I and Incze III were also doing sports, Incze I being an ice hockey player. Apart from football, Incze II also played ice hockey for the team based in Târgu Mureș and his son, Ladislau Incze IV played football at the highest level in Romania.

After retirement he was the manager of some teams based in Mureș County, among them Mureșul Luduș or CS Târgu Mureș.

== International career ==
Incze II played at international level in 4 matches for Romania.

== Honours ==
Mureșul Târgu Mureș

- Divizia B: 1938–39
