= Ferenc Nagy (footballer) =

Hungarian footballer and manager

Ferenc Nagy (21 February 1884 – 1964) was a Hungarian footballer and coach.

He played eight matches for Hungary national football team.

1925 he was the team mangager of Estonian national football team.
