= Nicolae Kovács =

Romanian-Hungarian footballer (1911–1977)

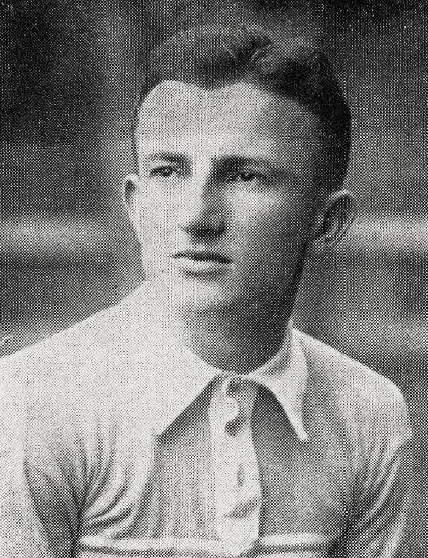

Personal information
- Full name: Kovács Miklos/Nicolae Covaci
- Date of birth: 29 December 1911
- Place of birth: Plugova, Austria-Hungary (now Mehadia, Romania)
- Date of death: 7 July 1977 (aged 65)
- Place of death: Timișoara, Romania
- Height: 1.74 m (5 ft 9 in)
- Position: Forward

Youth career
- 1924–1928: Chinezul Timișoara

Senior career*
Years	Team	Apps	(Gls)
1928–1930	Banatul Timișoara	43	(20)
1930–1931	Ripensia Timișoara	23	(8)
1931–1935	CA Oradea	51	(15)
1935	Ripensia Timișoara	14	(4)
1935–1936	Valenciennes	24	(10)
1936–1938	CA Oradea	39	(15)
1938–1940	Tricolor Ploieşti	21	(8)
1941–1942	Nagyváradi AC	26	(13)
1943–1945	Gamma	49	(21)
1945–1947	Ferar Cluj	44	(23)
1947	Crișana Oradea	21	(5)
1948	Chinezul Timișoara	14	(11)
Total		369	(153)

International career
1929–1938	Romania	37	(6)
1941	Hungary	1	(1)

Managerial career
- 1946–1947: Universitatea Cluj
- 1947: Ferar Cluj
- 1948–1949: ICO Oradea
- 1950–1953: Politehnica Timișoara
- 1953–1954: CSM Mediaş
- 1954: Minerul Petroșani
- 1957–1963: Minerul Nădrag
- * Club domestic league appearances and goals

Nicolae Kovács (Hungarian: Kovács Miklós, 29 December 1911 – 7 July 1977) (Note: Kovács' name was sometimes rendered as Nicolae Covaci.) was a Romanian-Hungarian football player and coach. A forward, he was a dual international football player and played both for Romania and Hungary. He played in 116 matches and scored 43 goals for Club Atletic Oradea.

For the Romania national team, he won 37 caps and participated in the 1930, 1934 and 1938 World Cups, being one of five players to have appeared in all three of the pre-war World Cups. The other players were Edmond Delfour, Étienne Mattler, Bernard Voorhoof and Rudolf Bürger, according to official FIFA match reports. He represented the Hungary national team once, in 1941, also scoring a goal in that game.

He was the older brother of Ștefan Kovács, the famous coach who led Ajax to two European Cups in 1972 and 1973.

== Career statistics ==
Romania's goal tally first

#	Date	Venue	Opponent	Score	Result	Competition
1.	15 September 1929	Levski Field, Sofia, Bulgaria	Bulgaria	2–2	3–2	Friendly
2.	14 July 1930	Estadio Pocitos, Montevideo, Uruguay	Peru	3–1	3–1	1930 FIFA World Cup
3.	28 June 1931	Stadion Maksimir, Zagreb, Yugoslavia	Yugoslavia	3–1	4–2	1929–31 Balkan Cup
4.	8 May 1932	Stadionul ONEF, Bucharest, Romania	Austria	1–1	4–1	1932 Central European Cup
5.	3 July 1932	Avala, Belgrade, Yugoslavia	Yugoslavia	1–2	1–3	1932 Balkan Cup

== Honours ==
=== Player ===
Ripensia Timișoara

- Liga I: 1935–36
- Cupa României: 1935–36

=== Coach ===
CA Oradea

- Liga I: 1948–49

Politehnica Timișoara

- Liga II: 1952
