= Francisc Mészáros =

Association football player (1919–1977)

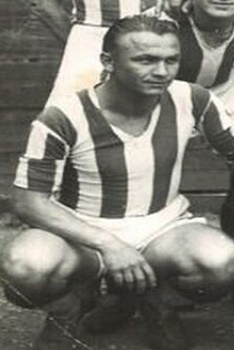
- Mészáros in the 1940s

Personal information
- Date of birth: 5 May 1919
- Place of birth: Mužla, First Czechoslovak Republic
- Date of death: 21 September 1977 (aged 58)
- Position: Defender

Senior career*
Years	Team	Apps	(Gls)
1936–1937	Dorogi		
1937–1941	Tokodi Üveggyá3ri SC	26	(1)
1941–1943	Újpest	46	(0)
1943–1944	Nagyváradi AC	33	(0)
1944–1945	Vasas	8	(0)
1945–1946	Libertatea		
1946–1947	IT Arad	13	(1)
1950–1952	Braga	13	(1)
Total		136	(3)

International career
1943	Hungary	1	(0)
1946	Romania	3	(0)

Managerial career
- 1954: Syria
- 1959: Iran
- 1961: Nicaragua
- 1966: Xelajú
- * Club domestic league appearances and goals

Francisc Mészáros (also known as Ferenc Mészáros; 5 May 1919 – 21 September 1977) was a footballer who played international football for both Hungary and Romania. He played as a defender for Dorogi, Tokodi Üveggyári SC, Újpest, Nagyváradi, Vasas, Libertatea, IT Arad and Braga. He managed the Syrian national team in 1954 and the Iranian national team in 1959.

== Honours ==
Nagyváradi

- Nemzeti Bajnokság I: 1943–44

IT Arad

- Liga I: 1946–47
