= 1943–44 Magyar Kupa =

Tournament details
- Country: Hungary

Final positions
- Champions: Ferencváros FC
- Runners-up: Kolozsvári AC

The 1943–44 Magyar Kupa (English: Hungarian Cup) was the 21st season of Hungary's annual knock-out cup football competition.

== Final ==
25 June 1944
17:00 (UTC+2)

Ferencváros FC	2–2	Kolozsvári AC
Ónodi 6', 52'	Report	Bonyhádi 53', 72'

MOVE-pálya, Budapest
Attendance: 28,000
Referee: Árpád Székely (Hungary)

=== Replay ===
2 July 1944
17:00 (UTC+2)

Ferencváros FC	3–1	Kolozsvári AC
Sárosi 51'; Sipos 57', 89'	Report	Bonyhádi 1'

Egyetemi-pálya, Kolozsvár
Attendance: 10,000
Referee: Árpád Székely (Hungary)

== See also ==
- 1943–44 Nemzeti Bajnokság I
