= 1950 Cupa României =

Tournament details
- Country: Romania

Final positions
- Champions: CCA București
- Runners-up: Flamura Roşie Arad

The 1950 Cupa României was the 13th edition of Romania's most prestigious football cup competition.

The title was won by CCA București against Flamura Roşie Arad.

== Format ==
The competition is an annual knockout tournament.

In the first round proper, two pots are made, the first pot with Divizia A teams and other teams till 16 and the second pot with the rest of teams qualified in this phase. First-pot teams will play away. Each tie is played as a single leg.

If a match is drawn after 90 minutes, the game goes in extra time, and if the score is still tied after 120 minutes, the team who plays away will qualify.

In case the teams are from same city, a replay will be played.

In case the teams play in the final, a replay will be played.

From the first edition, the teams from Divizia A entered in competition in sixteen finals, rule which remained till today.

== First round proper ==
Team 1	Score	Team 2
2 July 1950
Locomotiva Arad (Div. B)	2–1	(Div. A) CSU Timişoara
Metalul Baia Mare (Div. B)	1–3	(Div. A) Progresul Oradea
Mecano-Naval Brăila (Div. C)	1–6	(Div. A) Partizanul București
Spartac București (Div. B)	3–1	(Div. B) Metalul București
CSA Cluj (Div. B)	3–0	(Div. A) Locomotiva Târgu Mureş
Locomotiva PCA Constanţa (Div. C)	0–3	(Div. A) CCA București
Metalul Făgăraş (Div. C)	2–4	(Div. A) Locomotiva Sibiu
Metalul Hunedoara (Div. C)	1–2	(Div. A) Flamura Roşie Arad
CSU Iaşi (Div. B)	1–0	(Div. B) Locomotiva Iaşi
Metalul Oţelu Roşu (Div. B)	0–2	(Div. A) Locomotiva Timişoara
Partizanul Ploieşti (Div. B)	2–4	(Div. A) Dinamo București
Partizanul Câmpina (Div. C)	1–2	(Div. B) Dinamo Oraşul Stalin
Metalul Sibiu (Div. C)	1–1 (a.e.t.)	(Div. A) Partizanul Petroşani
CSA Someşeni (Div. C)	0–2 (a.e.t.)	(Div. B) CSU Cluj
Unirea Turnu Măgurele (Div. C)	3–9	(Div. A) Locomotiva București
Locomotiva Turnu Severin (Div. C)	5–2	(Div. A) Metalul Reșița

== Second round proper ==
Team 1	Score	Team 2
16 August 1950
CSU Cluj	0–1	Flamura Roşie Arad
17 August 1950
Locomotiva Arad	6–2	Partizanul Petroşani
Dinamo București	1–1	Partizanul București
Spartac București	0–2 (a.e.t.)	Locomotiva Sibiu
CSA Cluj	2–2 (a.e.t.)	Progresul Oradea
CSU Iaşi	2–4	CCA București
Dinamo Oraşul Stalin	4–3	Locomotiva București
Locomotiva Turnu Severin	1–2	Locomotiva Timişoara
7 September 1950 — Replay
Dinamo București	4–3 (R)	Partizanul București

== Quarter-finals ==
Team 1	Score	Team 2
10 September 1950
Locomotiva Sibiu	1–0	Locomotiva Arad
11 October 1950
CCA București	4–2	Dinamo Oraşul Stalin
Locomotiva Timişoara	1–2	Flamura Roşie Arad
12 October 1950
Progresul Oradea	2–1	Dinamo București

== Semi-finals ==
Team 1	Score	Team 2
25 October 1950
Flamura Roşie Arad	3–2	Progresul Oradea
1 November 1950
Locomotiva Sibiu	0–2	CCA București

== Final ==
26 November 1950
14:00 EET

CCA București	3–1	Flamura Roşie Arad
Apolzan 44' (pen.); Roman 72'; Moldoveanu 90'	Report	Mercea 89'

Republicii, Bucharest
Attendance: 25,000
Referee: Andrei Bölöni (Oraşul Stalin)
