= Gusztáv Juhász =

Romanian footballer and coach

Personal information
- Date of birth: 19 December 1911
- Place of birth: Temesvár, Austria-Hungary (now in Romania)
- Date of death: 20 January 2003 (aged 91)
- Place of death: New York City, United States
- Position: Midfielder

Youth career
- 1924–1930: Chinezul Timişoara

Senior career*
Years	Team	Apps	(Gls)
1930–1931	Chinezul Timişoara		
1931–1932	RGM Timișoara		
1932–1933	Juventus București	5	(0)
1933–1939	CA Oradea	95	(9)
1939–1940	Venus București	22	(0)
1940–1944	Nagyváradi AC	101	(1)
1945–1946	Libertatea Oradea		
1946	Crișana Oradea		
1947–1948	Libertatea Oradea	19	(1)

International career
1934–1940	Romania	21	(0)

Managerial career
- 1947: ITA Arad
- 1947–1948: Libertatea Oradea
- 1948: ITA Arad
- 1949: Explosivi Făgăraș
- 1950–1951: ICO Oradea
- 1952–1957: Dinamo Oradea
- 1965–1966: Crișul Oradea (youth center)
- 1966–1967: Crișul Oradea
- 1967–1972: Bihor Oradea (youth center)
- 1972–1974: Bihor Oradea (assistant)
- * Club domestic league appearances and goals

Gusztáv Juhász (also written as Guștav Iuhași; 19 December 1911 – 20 January 2003) was a Romanian football player and coach of Hungarian origin. He played in over 200 matches and scored 10 goals for Club Atletic Oradea.

== Biography ==
=== Player ===
As a midfielder, he played for 18 seasons in the Romanian and Hungarian leagues, mostly in the towns of Oradea and Bucharest.

=== Romania ===
With the Romania national football team, he was selected to play in the 1934 World Cup in Italy.

=== Coach ===
After his career as a player, he became the coach of several clubs in the town of his birth.

== Honours ==
=== Player ===
Venus București

- Liga I (1): 1939–40

Nagyváradi AC

- Nemzeti Bajnokság I (1): 1943–44

=== Coach ===
ITA Arad

- Cupa României (1): 1947–48

== Notes and references ==
- Gusztáv Juhász at RomanianSoccer.ro (in Romanian)
- Gusztáv Juhász at National-Football-Teams.com
