= List of FCSB seasons =

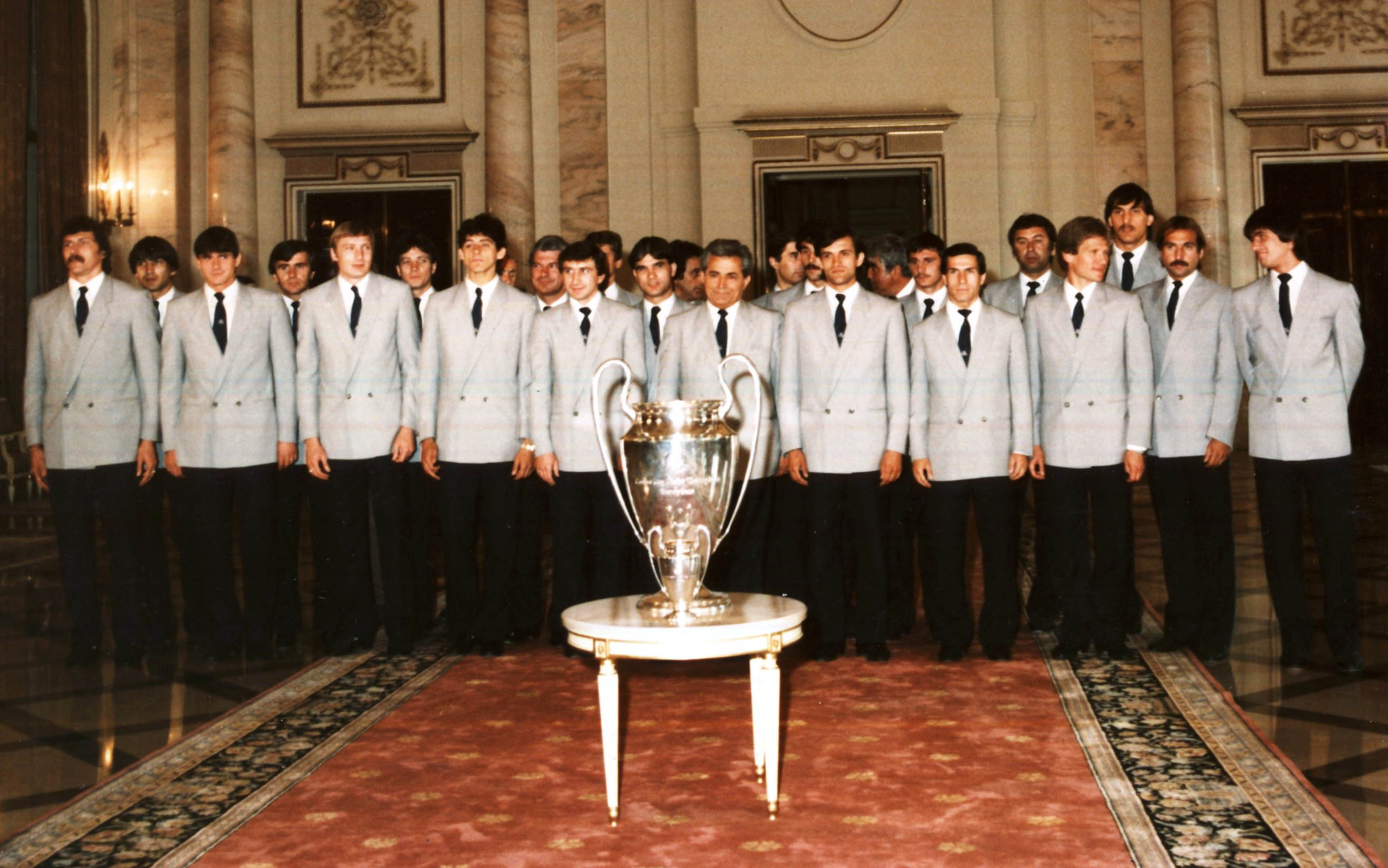
Steaua București squad with the UEFA European Champions Clubs' Cup in 1986.

Fotbal Club Steaua București is a professional association football club based in Ghencea, Bucharest, Romania. The club was founded in 1947 at the initiative of several officers of the Romanian Royal House. The establishment took place following a decree signed by General Mihail Lascăr, High Commander of the Romanian Royal Army. It was formed as a sports society with seven initial sections, including football, coached by Coloman Braun-Bogdan. The decision had been adopted on the ground that several officers were already playing for different teams, which was premise to a good nucleus for forming a future competitive team. As of 2023, FCSB is one of only three clubs to have never been relegated from the top level of Romanian football.

In the period from 1950 to 1955, FCSB won the Cupa Romaniei four times and the Liga I three times. FCSB enjoyed a successful start in Divizia A, winning the championship in four years from founding. However, after that run in the 50' did not win the league again until 1967. Under the leadership of coaches Emerich Jenei and Anghel Iordănescu, FCSB had an impressive Championship run in the 1984–85 season, which they eventually won after a six-year break.

What followed was an absolutely astonishing European Cup season. After eliminating Vejle, Honvéd, Kuusysi Lahti and Anderlecht, they were the first ever Romanian team to make it to a European Cup final. At the final, played on 7 May 1986 at the Ramón Sánchez Pizjuán Stadium in Seville, Spanish champions Barcelona were clear favourites, but after a goalless draw, legendary goalkeeper Helmut Duckadam saved all four penalties taken by the Spaniards being the first ever Romanian to reach the Guinness Book for that matter, while Gavril Balint and Marius Lăcătuș converted theirs to make Steaua the first Eastern-European team to conquer the supreme continental trophy.

Gheorghe Hagi, Romanian all-time best footballer, joined the club a few months later, scoring the only goal of the match against Dynamo Kyiv which brought FCSB an additional European Super Cup on 24 February 1987 in Monaco, just two

FCSB reached the UEFA Cup semi-finals in 2005–06, where it was eliminated by Middlesbrough thanks to a last-minute goal. FCSB thereafter qualified for the following Champions League seasons after a ten-year break, and in 2007–08 FCSB again reached the group stage of the Champions League. Nationally, the club won two titles—in 2004–05 and 2005–06—and the Supercupa României in 2006, the latter being the club's 50th trophy in its 59-year history.

== Key ==
Key to league:

- Pos. = Final position
- Pld = Matches played
- W = Matches won
- D = Matches drawn
- W= Matches won
- GF = Goals for
- GA = Goals against
- Pts = Points

Key to rounds:

- C = Champions
- F = Final (Runners-up)
- SF = Semi-finals
- QF = Quarter-finals
- R16/R32 = Round of 16, round of 32, etc.
- GS = Group stage

Champions	Runners-up

Top scorers shown in italics with number of goals scored in bold are players who were also top scorers in Liga I that season.

== Seasons ==
Season	League		Cupa României	Supercupa României	Cupa Ligii	Europe / South America		Coach
Season	Division	Pos	Cupa României	Supercupa României	Cupa Ligii	Europe / South America		Coach
1947–48	Divizia A	14th	Eighth-finals	not yet founded	not yet founded			Braun-Bogdan – Vâlcov
1948–49	Divizia A	6th	**Winners**	not yet founded	not yet founded			Vâlcov
1950	Divizia A	5th	**Winners**	not yet founded	not yet founded			Rónnay
1951	Divizia A	**Champion**	**Winners**	not yet founded	not yet founded			Popescu I
1952	Divizia A	**Champion**	**Winners**	not yet founded	not yet founded			Popescu I
1953	Divizia A	**Champion**	Final	not yet founded	not yet founded			Popescu I
1954	Divizia A	2nd	Semi-finals	not yet founded	not yet founded			Rónnay – Savu
1955	Divizia A	6th	**Winners**	not yet founded	not yet founded			Savu
1956	Divizia A	**Champion**	Semi-finals	not yet founded	not yet founded			Dobay
1957–58	Divizia A	2nd	Quarter-finals	not yet founded	not yet founded	EC	First round	Savu – Niculescu
1958–59	Divizia A	3rd	Quarter-finals	not yet founded	not yet founded			Popescu I
1959–60	Divizia A	**Champion**	Quarter-finals	not yet founded	not yet founded			Popescu I
1960–61	Divizia A	**Champion**	Semi-finals	not yet founded	not yet founded	EC	Preliminary round	Onisie
1961–62	Divizia A	9th	**Winners**	not yet founded	not yet founded	EC	Preliminary round	Mladin – Popescu I
1962–63	Divizia A	2nd	Semi-finals	not yet founded	not yet founded	ECWC	Preliminary round	Onisie
1963–64	Divizia A	3rd	Final	not yet founded	not yet founded			Ola
1964–65	Divizia A	3rd	Eighth-finals	not yet founded	not yet founded	ECWC	Second round	Savu
1965–66	Divizia A	12th	**Winners**	not yet founded	not yet founded			Savu
1966–67	Divizia A	5th	**Winners**	not yet founded	not yet founded	ECWC	First round	Savu
1967–68	Divizia A	**Champion**	Quarter-finals	not yet founded	not yet founded	ECWC	Second round	Kovács
1968–69	Divizia A	4th	**Winners**	not yet founded	not yet founded	EC	First round	Kovács
1969–70	Divizia A	3rd	**Winners**	not yet founded	not yet founded	ECWC	First round	Kovács
1970–71	Divizia A	3rd	**Winners**	not yet founded	not yet founded	ECWC	Second round	Onisie
1971–72	Divizia A	9th	Sixteen-finals	not yet founded	not yet founded	ECWC	Quarter-finals	Stănescu
1972–73	Divizia A	6th	Semi-finals	not yet founded	not yet founded			Constantin
1973–74	Divizia A	6th	Semi-finals	not yet founded	not yet founded			Constantin – Teașcă
1974–75	Divizia A	5th	Semi-finals	not yet founded	not yet founded			Teașcă
1975–76	Divizia A	**Champion**	**Winners**	not yet founded	not yet founded			Jenei
1976–77	Divizia A	2nd	Final	not yet founded	not yet founded	EC	First round	Jenei
1977–78	Divizia A	**Champion**	Eighth-finals	not yet founded	not yet founded	UC	First round	Jenei
1978–79	Divizia A	3rd	**Winners**	not yet founded	not yet founded	EC	Preliminary round	Constantin
1979–80	Divizia A	2nd	Final	not yet founded	not yet founded	ECWC	Second round	Constantin
1980–81	Divizia A	4th	Quarter-finals	not yet founded	not yet founded	UC	First round	Constantin
1981–82	Divizia A	6th	Eighth-finals	not yet founded	not yet founded			Traian Ionescu – Cernăianu
1982–83	Divizia A	5th	Eighth-finals	not yet founded	not yet founded			Cernăianu
1983–84	Divizia A	2nd	Final	not yet founded	not yet founded			Jenei
1984–85	Divizia A	**Champion**	**Winners**	not yet founded	not yet founded	ECWC	First round	Halagian – Jenei
1985–86	Divizia A	**Champion**	Final	not yet founded	not yet founded	EC	**Winners**	Jenei
1986–87	Divizia A	**Champion**	**Winners**	not yet founded	not yet founded	EC	Second round	Jenei – Iordănescu
1986–87	Divizia A	**Champion**	**Winners**	not yet founded	not yet founded	ESC	**Winners**	Jenei – Iordănescu
1986–87	Divizia A	**Champion**	**Winners**	not yet founded	not yet founded	IC	Final	Jenei – Iordănescu
1987–88	Divizia A	**Champion**	**Winners**	not yet founded	not yet founded	EC	Semi-finals	Iordănescu
1988–89	Divizia A	**Champion**	**Winners**	not yet founded	not yet founded	EC	Final	Iordănescu
1989–90	Divizia A	2nd	Final	not yet founded	not yet founded	EC	Second round	Iordănescu
1990–91	Divizia A	2nd	Quarter-finals	not yet founded	not yet founded	ECWC	Second round	Ștefănescu – Hălmageanu – Jenei
1991–92	Divizia A	2nd	**Winners**	not yet founded	not yet founded	UC	Third round	Jenei – Pițurcă
1992–93	Divizia A	**Champion**	Quarter-finals	not yet founded	not yet founded	ECWC	Quarter-finals	Iordănescu
1993–94	Divizia A	**Champion**	Eighth-finals	not yet founded	not yet founded	UCL	Second round	Jenei
1994–95	Divizia A	**Champion**	Eighth-finals	**Winners**	not yet founded	UCL	3rd – Group C	Dumitriu
1995–96	Divizia A	**Champion**	**Winners**	**Winners**	not yet founded	UCL	3rd – Group C	Dumitriu
1996–97	Divizia A	**Champion**	**Winners**	Not held	not yet founded	UCL	4th – Group B	Dumitriu
1997–98	Divizia A	**Champion**	Quarter-finals	Not held	not yet founded	UCL	Second qualifying round	Stoichiță
1997–98	Divizia A	**Champion**	Quarter-finals	Not held	not yet founded	UC	Third round	Stoichiță
1998–99	Divizia A	3rd	**Winners**	**Winners**	not yet founded	UCL	Second qualifying round	Stoichiță – Jenei
1998–99	Divizia A	3rd	**Winners**	**Winners**	not yet founded	UC	First round	Stoichiță – Jenei
1999–00	Divizia A	3rd	Eighth-finals	Final	not yet founded	UC	Second round	Jenei
2000–01	Divizia A	**Champion**	Quarter-finals	Not held	not yet founded			Pițurcă
2001–02	Divizia A	4th	Semi-finals	**Winners**	not yet founded	UCL	Third qualifying round	Pițurcă
2001–02	Divizia A	4th	Semi-finals	**Winners**	not yet founded	UC	First round	Pițurcă
2002–03	Divizia A	2nd	Eighth-finals		not yet founded			Olăroiu – Pițurcă
2003–04	Divizia A	2nd	Eighth-finals		not yet founded	UC	Second round	Pițurcă
2004–05	Divizia A	**Champion**	Sixteen-finals	Not held	not yet founded	UC	Round of 16	Zenga – Dumitriu
2005–06	Divizia A	**Champion**	Sixteen-finals	Final	not yet founded	UCL	Third qualifying round	Protasov – Olăroiu
2005–06	Divizia A	**Champion**	Sixteen-finals	Final	not yet founded	UC	Semi-finals	Protasov – Olăroiu
2006–07	Liga I	2nd	Semi-finals	**Winners**	not yet founded	UCL	3rd – Group E	Olăroiu
2006–07	Liga I	2nd	Semi-finals	**Winners**	not yet founded	UC	Round of 32	Olăroiu
2007–08	Liga I	2nd	Eighth-finals		not yet founded	UCL	4th – Group H	Hagi – Pedrazzini – Lăcătuș
2008–09	Liga I	6th	Sixteen-finals	Not held	not yet founded	UCL	4th – Group F	Lăcătuș – Munteanu – Lăcătuș
2009–10	Liga I	4th	Eighth-finals		not yet founded	UEL	4th – Group H	Bergodi – Stoichiță
2010–11	Liga I	5th	**Winners**		not yet founded	UEL	3rd – Group K	Pițurcă – Dumitrescu – Lăcătuș – Cârțu – Caramarin^{(C)}
2011–12	Liga I	3rd	Eighth-finals	Final	not yet founded	UEL	Round of 32	Levy – Stan – Stoichiță
2012–13	Liga I	**Champion**	Eighth-finals		not yet founded	UEL	Round of 16	Reghecampf
2013–14	Liga I	**Champion**	Final	**Winners**	not yet founded	UCL	4th – Group E	Reghecampf
2014–15	Liga I	**Champion**	**Winners**	Final	**Winners**	UCL	Play-off round	Gâlcă
2014–15	Liga I	**Champion**	**Winners**	Final	**Winners**	UEL	3rd – Group J	Gâlcă
2015–16	Liga I	2nd	Final	Final	**Winners**	UCL	Third qualifying round	Pedrazzini – Dumitriu – Reghecampf
2015–16	Liga I	2nd	Final	Final	**Winners**	UEL	Play-off round	Pedrazzini – Dumitriu – Reghecampf
2016–17	Liga I	2nd	Eighth-finals		Semi-finals	UCL	Play-off round	Reghecampf
2016–17	Liga I	2nd	Eighth-finals		Semi-finals	UEL	4th – Group L	Reghecampf
2017–18	Liga I	2nd	Quarter-finals		defunct	UCL	Play-off round	Dică
2017–18	Liga I	2nd	Quarter-finals		defunct	UEL	Round of 32	Dică
2018–19	Liga I	2nd	Eighth-finals		defunct	UEL	Play-off round	Dică – Teja
2019–20	Liga I	5th	**Winners**		defunct	UEL	Play-off round	Andone – Vintilă
2020–21	Liga I	2nd	Eighth-finals	Final	defunct	UEL	Third Qualifying Round	Vintilă – Andronache – Petrea
2021–22	Liga I	2nd	Eighth-finals		defunct	UECL	Second Qualifying Round	Todoran – Iordănescu – Petrea
2022–23	Liga I	2nd	Group-Stage		defunct	UECL	4th - Group B	Petrea – Dică – Strizu – Charalambous
2023–24	Liga I	**Champion**	Group-Stage	**Winners**	defunct	UECL	Third Qualifying Round	Charalambous
2024–25	Liga I	**Champion**	Group-Stage	**Winners**	defunct	CL	Third Qualifying Round	Charalambous
2024–25	Liga I	**Champion**	Group-Stage	**Winners**	defunct	UEL	Round of 16	Charalambous
