= 1955 FC Steaua București season =

CCA București
1955 season
- Manager: Ilie Savu
- Stadium: Republicii / 23 August
- Divizia A: 6th
- Cupa României: Winners
- Top goalscorer: Nicolae Tătaru (16)

The 1955 season was FC Steaua București's 8th season since its founding in 1947.

== Divizia A ==
=== League table ===
Pos	Team	Pld	W	D	L	GF	GA	GD	Pts
4	Știința Timișoara	24	10	7	7	47	30	+17	27
5	Flamura Roșie Arad	24	10	6	8	35	28	+7	26
6	CCA București	24	8	7	9	38	26	+12	23
7	Știința Cluj	24	8	7	9	27	35	−8	23
8	Minerul Petroșani	24	8	6	10	26	33	−7	22

Source: LT
Rules for classification: 1) points; 2) goal average; 3) number of goals scored

=== Results ===
6 March 1955 Round 1	CCA București	2 – 1	Știința Timișoara	Bucharest
EET (UTC+02)				Stadium: Republicii; Referee: Solomon Seagal

13 March 1955 Round 2	Locomotiva Târgu Mureș	0 – 1	CCA București	Târgu Mureș
EET (UTC+02)				Referee: Gheorghe Keppich

20 March 1955 Round 3	CCA București	1 – 1	Dinamo Orașul Stalin	Bucharest
EET (UTC+02)				Stadium: Republicii; Referee: Tiberiu Asztalos

23 March 1955 Round 4	Progresul București	2 – 1	CCA București	Bucharest
EET (UTC+02)				Stadium: Dr. Staicovici; Referee: Petre Kroner

27 March 1955 Round 5	Știința Cluj	1 – 1	CCA București	Cluj-Napoca
EET (UTC+02)				Stadium: Ion Moina; Referee: Alexandru Toth

2 April 1955 Round 6	CCA București	0 – 1	Flacăra Ploiești	Bucharest
EET (UTC+02)				Stadium: Republicii; Referee: Francisc Mateescu

10 April 1955 Round 7	Avântul Reghin	1 – 9	CCA București	Reghin
EET (UTC+02)				Stadium: Municipal; Referee: Lucian Paunescu

13 April 1955 Round 8	CCA București	0 – 0	Dinamo București	Bucharest
EET (UTC+02)				Stadium: Republicii; Referee: Dumitru Schulder

24 April 1955 Round 10	CCA București	2 – 1	Locomotiva Timișoara	Bucharest
EET (UTC+02)				Stadium: Republicii; Referee: Stefan Geac

1 May 1955 Round 11	Locomotiva Constanța	1 – 0	CCA București	Constanța
EET (UTC+02)				Stadium: Farul; Referee: Gheorghe Dragomirescu

8 May 1955 Round 12	Flamura Roșie Arad	1 – 0	CCA București	Arad
EET (UTC+02)				Stadium: Francisc von Neuman; Referee: Adalbert Varga

15 May 1955 Round 13	CCA București	2 – 1	Minerul Petroșani	Bucharest
EET (UTC+02)				Stadium: Republicii; Referee: Alexandru Toth

21 August 1955 Round 14	Știința Timișoara	2 – 2	CCA București	Timișoara
EET (UTC+02)				Referee: Gheorghe Dragomirescu

24 August 1955 Round 15	CCA București	0 – 0	Locomotiva Târgu Mureș	Bucharest
EET (UTC+02)				Stadium: Republicii; Referee: Nicolae Szego

28 August 1955 Round 16	Dinamo Orașul Stalin	2 – 1	CCA București	Orașul Stalin
EET (UTC+02)				Referee: Alexandru Toth

16 October 1955 Round 17	CCA București	0 – 0	Progresul București	Bucharest
EET (UTC+02)				Stadium: Republicii; Referee: Constantin Mitran

23 October 1955 Round 18	CCA București	3 – 1	Știința Cluj	Bucharest
EET (UTC+02)				Stadium: Republicii; Referee: Aurel Maier

26 October 1955 Round 19	Flacăra Ploiești	2 – 0	CCA București	Ploiești
EET (UTC+02)				Stadium: Ilie Oană; Referee: Dumitru Schulder

30 October 1955 Round 20	CCA București	7 – 1	Avântul Reghin	Bucharest
EET (UTC+02)				Stadium: Republicii; Referee: Adalbert Kincs

6 November 1955 Round 21	Dinamo București	2 – 1	CCA București	Bucharest
EET (UTC+02)			Tătaru I 1'	Stadium: Dinamo; Referee: Solomon Seagal

16 November 1955 Round 23	Locomotiva Timișoara	2 – 0	CCA București	Timișoara
EET (UTC+02)				Stadium: CFR; Referee: Lucian Paunescu

20 November 1955 Round 24	CCA București	4 – 0	Locomotiva Constanța	Bucharest
EET (UTC+02)				Stadium: Republicii; Referee: Tiberiu Asztalos

27 November 1955 Round 25	CCA București	0 – 2	Flamura Roșie Arad	Bucharest
EET (UTC+02)				Stadium: Republicii; Referee: Ilie Draghici

30 November 1955 Round 26	Minerul Petroșani	1 – 1	CCA București	Petroșani
EET (UTC+02)				Stadium: Jiul; Referee: Marco Alvarez Moreno

== Cupa României ==
=== Results ===
18 October 1955 Round of 32	Dinamo Pitești	2 – 3	CCA București	Pitești
EET (UTC+02)

2 November 1955 Round of 16	Dinamo Bacău	0 – 3	CCA București	Bacău
EET (UTC+02)

23 November 1955 Quarter-finals	CCA București	5 – 2	Metalul Câmpia Turzii	Bucharest
EET (UTC+02)				Stadium: Republicii

11 December 1955 Semi-finals	CCA București	4 – 0	Locomotiva București	Bucharest
EET (UTC+02)				Stadium: Republicii

18 December 1955 Final	CCA București	6 – 3 (a.e.t.)	Progresul Oradea	Bucharest
14:00 EET (UTC+02)	Zavoda 57'; Alecsandrescu 65', 108'; Moldovan 68'; Constantin 95'; Onisie 101'	Report	Tóth 45'; Florea 58'; Vlad 77'	Stadium: Republicii; Attendance: 30,000; Referee: Dumitru Schulder (Bucharest)

== See also ==
- 1955 Cupa României
- 1955 Divizia A
