= 1960–61 FC Steaua București season =

CCA București
1960–61 season
- Manager: Ștefan Onisie
- Stadium: Republicii / 23 August
- Divizia A: Champions
- Cupa României: Semi-finals
- European Cup: Preliminary round
- Top goalscorer: Gheorghe Constantin (22)

The 1960–61 season was FC Steaua București's 13th season since its founding in 1947.

== Divizia A ==
=== League table ===
| Pos | Team | Pld | W | D | L | GF | GA | GD | Pts | Qualification or relegation |
|---|---|---|---|---|---|---|---|---|---|---|
| 1 | CCA București (C) | 26 | 17 | 3 | 6 | 61 | 36 | +25 | 37 | Qualification to European Cup preliminary round |
| 2 | Dinamo București | 26 | 14 | 4 | 8 | 56 | 31 | +25 | 32 | Invitation to Balkans Cup |
| 3 | Rapid București | 26 | 11 | 8 | 7 | 37 | 31 | +6 | 30 | |
| 4 | Știința Cluj | 26 | 12 | 5 | 9 | 48 | 44 | +4 | 29 | |
| 5 | Steagul Roşu Brașov | 26 | 12 | 4 | 10 | 50 | 40 | +10 | 28 | Invitation to Balkans Cup |

Source: LT
Rules for classification: 1) points; 2) goal average; 3) number of goals scored
(C) Champions

=== Results ===
| 4 September 1960 1 | Farul Constanța | 2 – 3 | CCA București | Constanța |
| EET (UTC+02) | | | | Stadium: Farul; Referee: Cornel Nitescu |

| 11 September 1960 2 | CCA București | 7 – 1 | Corvinul Hunedoara | Bucharest |
| EET (UTC+02) | | | | Stadium: Republicii; Referee: Stelian Mataizer |

| 18 September 1960 3 | Rapid București | 3 – 2 | CCA București | Bucharest |
| EET (UTC+02) | | | | Stadium: Giulești-Valentin Stănescu; Referee: Alexandru Toth |

| 25 September 1960 4 | CSMS Iași | 0 – 1 | CCA București | Iași |
| EET (UTC+02) | | | | Stadium: Emil Alexandrescu; Referee: Emil Bucse |

| 2 October 1960 5 | CCA București | 5 – 3 | Steagul Roşu Brașov | Bucharest |
| EET (UTC+02) | | | | Stadium: Republicii; Referee: Alexandru Toth |

| 9 October 1960 6 | Petrolul Ploiești | 2 – 1 | CCA București | Ploiești |
| EET (UTC+02) | | | | Stadium: Ilie Oană; Referee: Cornel Nitescu |

| 16 October 1960 7 | Progresul București | 2 – 6 | CCA București | Bucharest |
| EET (UTC+02) | | | | Stadium: Dr. Staicovici; Referee: Mihai Popa |

| 23 October 1960 8 | CCA București | 1 – 0 | Știința Timișoara | Bucharest |
| EET (UTC+02) | | | | Stadium: Republicii; Referee: Ioan Chiritescu |

| 30 October 1960 9 | UTA Arad | 1 – 2 | CCA București | Arad |
| EET (UTC+02) | | | | Stadium: Francisc von Neuman; Referee: Constantin Ianopol |

| 6 November 1960 10 | CCA București | 0 – 2 | Minerul Lupeni | Bucharest |
| EET (UTC+02) | | | | Stadium: Republicii; Referee: Iosif Ritter |

| 13 November 1960 11 | CCA București | 3 – 2 | Dinamo București | Bucharest |
| EET (UTC+02) | Alecsandrescu 15'; Constantin 43' (pen.), 81' | | Varga 17'; Țîrcovnicu 19' | Stadium: 23 August; Referee: Nicolae Mihailescu |

| 20 November 1960 12 | Știința Cluj | 1 – 5 | CCA București | Cluj-Napoca |
| EET (UTC+02) | | | | Stadium: Ion Moina; Referee: Gheorghe Osiac |

| 27 November 1960 13 | CCA București | 2 – 0 | Dinamo Bacău | Bucharest |
| EET (UTC+02) | | | | Stadium: Republicii; Referee: Stavru Nicolau |

| 19 March 1961 14 | CCA București | 2 – 2 | Farul Constanța | Bucharest |
| EET (UTC+02) | | | | Stadium: Republicii; Referee: Gheorghe Osiac |

| 26 March 1961 15 | Corvinul Hunedoara | 2 – 3 | CCA București | Hunedoara |
| EET (UTC+02) | | | | Stadium: Michael Klein; Referee: Mihai Vasiliu |

| 2 April 1961 16 | CCA București | 0 – 1 | Rapid București | Bucharest |
| EET (UTC+02) | | | | Stadium: 23 August; Referee: Gheorghe Dulea |

| 9 April 1961 17 | CCA București | 3 – 2 | CSMS Iași | Bucharest |
| EET (UTC+02) | | | | Stadium: Republicii; Referee: Adrian Macovei |

| 16 April 1961 18 | Steagul Roşu Brașov | 2 – 1 | CCA București | Brașov |
| EET (UTC+02) | | | | Stadium: Tineretului; Referee: Iosif Ritter |

| 23 April 1961 19 | CCA București | 3 – 0 | Petrolul Ploiești | Bucharest |
| EET (UTC+02) | | | | Stadium: Republicii; Referee: Romulus Sabau |

| 30 April 1961 20 | CCA București | 0 – 2 | Progresul București | Bucharest |
| EET (UTC+02) | | | | Stadium: Republicii; Referee: Andrei Radulescu |

| 7 May 1961 21 | Știința Timișoara | 2 – 2 | CCA București | Timișoara |
| EET (UTC+02) | | | | Stadium: Dan Păltinișanu; Referee: Octavian Comsa |

| 21 May 1961 22 | CCA București | 2 – 0 | UTA Arad | Bucharest |
| EET (UTC+02) | | | | Stadium: Republicii; Referee: Adrian Macovei |

| 28 May 1961 23 | Minerul Lupeni | 0 – 1 | CCA București | Lupeni |
| EET (UTC+02) | | | | Stadium: Minerul; Referee: Emil Bucse |

| 11 June 1961 25 | CCA București | 2 – 2 | Știința Cluj | Bucharest |
| EET (UTC+02) | | | | Stadium: 23 August; Referee: Octavian Comsa |

| 25 June 1961 26 | Dinamo Bacău | 0 – 1 | CCA București | Bacău |
| EET (UTC+02) | | | | Referee: Zaharia Draghici |

| 29 June 1961 24 | Dinamo București | 2 – 3 | CCA București | Bucharest |
| EET (UTC+02) | | | Constantin ??'; Raksi ??'; Tătaru I ??' | Stadium: Dinamo; Referee: Andrei Radulescu |

== Cupa României ==
=== Results ===
| 19 April 1961 Round of 32 | CCA București | 4 – 2 | Electroputere Craiova | Bucharest |
| EET (UTC+02) | | | | Stadium: Republicii |

| 21 June 1961 Round of 16 | CCA București | 5 – 2 | CSM Reșița | Bucharest |
| EET (UTC+02) | | | | Stadium: Republicii |

| 18 October 1961 Quarter-finals | CCA București | 3 – 0 | Progresul București | Bucharest |
| EET (UTC+02) | | | | Stadium: Republicii |

| 22 October 1961 Semi-finals | Rapid București | 2 – 0 | CCA București | Bucharest |
| EET (UTC+02) | | | | Stadium: Giulești-Valentin Stănescu |

== European Cup ==
=== Preliminary round ===
| September 1960 First leg | CCA București (Romania) | x–wo | (Czechoslovakia) Spartak Hradec Králové | Bucharest |
| EET (UTC+02) | | Report | | Stadium: 23 August |

| October 1960 Second leg | Spartak Hradec Králové (Czechoslovakia) | x–wo | (Romania) CCA București | Hradec Králové |
| EET (UTC+02) | | Report | | Stadium: Všesportovní stadion |

== See also ==
- 1960–61 European Cup
- 1960–61 Cupa României
- 1960–61 Divizia A
