= 1954 FC Steaua București season =

CCA București
1954 season
- Manager: Ferenc Rónay, Ilie Savu
- Stadium: Republicii / 23 August
- Divizia A: 2nd
- Cupa României: Semi-finals
- Top goalscorer: Iosif Petschovsky (7)

The 1954 season was FC Steaua București's 7th season since its founding in 1947.

== Divizia A ==
=== League table ===
Pos	Team	Pld	W	D	L	GF	GA	GD	Pts	Qualification or relegation
1	Flamura Roșie Arad (C)	26	15	5	6	37	29	+8	35	Champions of Romania
2	CCA București	26	13	8	5	35	25	+10	34	
3	Dinamo București	26	12	9	5	62	36	+26	33	
4	Locomotiva Timișoara	26	10	9	7	40	22	+18	29	
5	Știința Cluj	26	11	6	9	32	32	0	28	

Source: LT
Rules for classification: 1) points; 2) goal average; 3) number of goals scored
(C) Champions

=== Results ===
21 March 1954 Round 1	Flacăra Ploiești	0 – 1	CCA București	Ploieşti
EET (UTC+02)				Stadium: Ilie Oană; Referee: Andrei Boloni

28 March 1954 Round 2	Locomotiva Târgu Mureș	0 – 2	CCA București	Târgu Mureș
EET (UTC+02)				Referee: Lucian Paunescu

4 April 1954 Round 3	Locomotiva București	2 – 3	CCA București	Bucharest
EET (UTC+02)				Stadium: Giulești-Valentin Stănescu; Referee: Tiberiu Asztalos

7 April 1954 Round 4	CCA București	0 – 1	Știința Cluj	Bucharest
EET (UTC+02)				Stadium: 23 August; Referee: Alexandru Toth

11 April 1954 Round 5	Metalul Hunedoara	2 – 1	CCA București	Hunedoara
EET (UTC+02)				Stadium: Michael Klein; Referee: Gheorghe Keppich

16 May 1954 Round 7	CCA București	2 – 1	Locomotiva Timișoara	Bucharest
EET (UTC+02)				Stadium: 23 August; Referee: Constantin Mitran

19 May 1954 Round 8	CCA București	2 – 1	Dinamo Orașul Stalin	Bucharest
EET (UTC+02)				Stadium: 23 August; Referee: Dumitru Schulder

23 May 1954 Round 9	Progresul Oradea	1 – 1	CCA București	Oradea
EET (UTC+02)				Stadium: Iuliu Bodola; Referee: Andrei Boloni

30 May 1954 Round 10	CCA București	2 – 1	Flamura Roșie Arad	Bucharest
EET (UTC+02)				Stadium: 23 August; Referee: Solomon Seagal

2 June 1954 Round 11	Metalul Câmpia Turzii	1 – 4	CCA București	Câmpia Turzii
EET (UTC+02)				Stadium: Mihai Adam; Referee: Nicolae Szego

6 June 1954 Round 12	CCA București	2 – 2	Minerul Petroșani	Bucharest
EET (UTC+02)				Stadium: 23 August; Referee: Gheorghe Ionescu

12 June 1954 Round 13	Știința Timișoara	0 – 0	CCA București	Timișoara
EET (UTC+02)				Referee: Adalbert Varga

16 June 1954 Round 6	Dinamo București	0 – 0	CCA București	Bucharest
EET (UTC+02)				Stadium: Dinamo; Referee: Dumitru Schulder

26 September 1954 Round 16	CCA București	3 – 0	Locomotiva București	Bucharest
EET (UTC+02)				Stadium: 23 August; Referee: Mihai Popa

29 September 1954 Round 15	CCA București	1 – 1	Locomotiva Târgu Mureș	Bucharest
EET (UTC+02)				Stadium: 23 August; Referee: Sigmund Lupu

3 October 1954 Round 17	Știința Cluj	1 – 0	CCA București	Cluj-Napoca
EET (UTC+02)				Stadium: Ion Moina; Referee: Tiberiu Aszatalos

7 October 1954 Round 14	CCA București	2 – 1	Flacăra Ploiești	Bucharest
EET (UTC+02)				Stadium: 23 August; Referee: Solomon Seagal

10 October 1954 Round 18	CCA București	1 – 0	Metalul Hunedoara	Bucharest
EET (UTC+02)				Stadium: 23 August; Referee: Cristian Popescu

17 October 1954 Round 19	CCA București	2 – 2	Dinamo București	Bucharest
EET (UTC+02)				Stadium: 23 August; Referee: Dumitru Schulder

24 October 1954 Round 20	Locomotiva Timișoara	2 – 0	CCA București	Timișoara
EET (UTC+02)				Stadium: CFR; Referee: Solomon Seagal

27 October 1954 Round 21	Dinamo Orașul Stalin	1 – 2	CCA București	Orașul Stalin
EET (UTC+02)				Referee: Solomon Seagal

31 October 1954 Round 22	CCA București	1 – 0	Progresul Oradea	Bucharest
EET (UTC+02)				Stadium: 23 August; Referee: Andrei Boloni

7 November 1954 Round 23	Flamura Roșie Arad	3 – 0	CCA București	Arad
EET (UTC+02)				Stadium: Francisc von Neuman; Referee: Andrei Boloni

14 November 1954 Round 25	Minerul Petroșani	0 – 0	CCA București	Petroșani
EET (UTC+02)				Stadium: Jiul; Referee: Constantin Mitran

21 November 1954 Round 24	CCA București	2 – 2	Metalul Câmpia Turzii	Bucharest
EET (UTC+02)				Stadium: 23 August; Referee: Francisc Mateescu

24 November 1954 Round 26	CCA București	1 – 0	Știința Timișoara	Bucharest
EET (UTC+02)				Stadium: 23 August; Referee: Constantin Mitran

== Cupa României ==
=== Results ===
11 August 1954 Round of 32	Locomotiva Iaşi	1 – 3 (a.e.t.)	CCA București	Iaşi
EET (UTC+02)

20 October 1954 Round of 16	Locomotiva Constanța	0 – 1	CCA București	Constanța
EET (UTC+02)

28 November 1954 Quarter-finals	CCA București	1 – 0	Locomotiva București	Bucharest
EET (UTC+02)				Stadium: 23 August

1 December 1954 Semi-finals	Metalul Reșița	1 – 0	CCA București	Reșița
EET (UTC+02)				Stadium: Mircea Chivu

== See also ==
- 1954 Cupa României
- 1954 Divizia A
