= 1956 FC Steaua București season =

CCA București
1956 season
- Manager: Ștefan Dobay
- Stadium: Republicii / 23 August
- Divizia A: Champions
- Cupa României: Semi-finals
- Top goalscorer: Ion Alecsandrescu (18)

The 1956 season was FC Steaua București's 9th season since its founding in 1947.

== Friendly matches ==
Win Draw Loss

1 April 1956 Friendly	CCA București (Romania)	4–1	(Belgium) Charleroi	Bucharest, Romania
EET (UTC+2)				Stadium: 23 August

23 May 1956 Friendly	CCA București (Romania)	5–1	(England) Luton Town	Bucharest, Romania
EET (UTC+2)	Constantin (??); Cacoveanu (??); Alecsandrescu (??); Zavoda I (??)			Stadium: 23 August; Attendance: 120,000

1956 Friendly	CCA București (Romania)	2–3	(East Germany) Dynamo Berlin	Bucharest, Romania
EET (UTC+2)				Stadium: 23 August

16 October 1956 Friendly	Arsenal (England)	1–1	(Romania) CCA București	London, England
	Holton 79'		Constantin 49'	Stadium: Highbury; Attendance: 70,000

22 October 1956 Friendly	Sheffield Wednesday (England)	3–3	(Romania) CCA București	Sheffield, England
	Froggatt 18'; Quixall 43'; Watson 50'		Alecsandrescu 16'; V. Moldovan 56', 65'	Stadium: Hillsborough; Attendance: 40,000

25 October 1956 Friendly	Luton Town (England)	3–4	(Romania) CCA București	Luton, England
	Gregory 10'; Cummins 14'; Adam 21'		Constantin 28', 59'; Alecsandrescu 50'; Onisie 57'	Stadium: Kenilworth Road; Attendance: 20,000

29 October 1956 Friendly	Wolverhampton Wanderers (England)	5–0	(Romania) CCA București	Wolverhampton, England
	Murray 3'; Hooper 20' (pen.); Broadbent 62'; Booth 77'; Mullen 81'			Stadium: Molineux Stadium; Attendance: 50,000

=== Divizia A ===
==== League table ====
Pos	Team	Pld	W	D	L	GF	GA	GD	Pts	Qualification or relegation
1	CCA București (C)	24	15	3	6	64	28	+36	33	Qualification to European Cup first round
2	Dinamo București	24	13	3	8	48	34	+14	29	
3	Știința Timișoara	24	11	7	6	40	31	+9	29	
4	Locomotiva București	24	9	10	5	46	27	+19	28	
5	Energia Ploiești	24	9	9	6	42	25	+17	27	

Source: LT
Rules for classification: 1) points; 2) goal average; 3) number of goals scored
(C) Champions

==== Results ====
18 March 1956 Round 1	Dinamo Orașul Stalin	0 – 1	CCA București	Orașul Stalin
EET (UTC+02)				Referee: Alexandru Toth

25 March 1956 Round 2	CCA București	2 – 0	Energia Ploiești	Bucharest
EET (UTC+02)				Stadium: Republicii; Referee: Lucian Paunescu

8 April 1956 Round 4	CCA București	1 – 1	Locomotiva București	Bucharest
EET (UTC+02)				Stadium: Republicii; Referee: Constantin Mitran

11 April 1956 Round 5	Dinamo București	0 – 4	CCA București	Bucharest
EET (UTC+02)			Zavoda I 19'; Tătaru I 25', 80'; Alecsandrescu 74'	Stadium: Dinamo; Referee: Dumitru Schulder

29 April 1956 Round 6	CCA București	3 – 0	Știința Cluj	Bucharest
EET (UTC+02)				Stadium: Republicii; Referee: Solomon Seagal

6 May 1956 Round 7	Dinamo Bacău	0 – 8	CCA București	Bacău
EET (UTC+02)				Referee: Constantin Popescu

13 May 1956 Round 8	CCA București	1 – 1	Progresul București	Bucharest
EET (UTC+02)				Stadium: Republicii; Referee: Tiberiu Asztalos

20 May 1956 Round 9	CCA București	5 – 1	Flamura Roșie Arad	Bucharest
EET (UTC+02)				Stadium: Republicii; Referee: Mircea Crutescu

27 May 1956 Round 10	Progresul Oradea	3 – 1	CCA București	Oradea
EET (UTC+02)				Stadium: Iuliu Bodola; Referee: Solomon Seagal

31 May 1956 Round 3	Minerul Petroșani	0 – 1	CCA București	Petroșani
EET (UTC+02)				Stadium: Jiul; Referee: Alexandru Toth

7 June 1956 Round 12	CCA București	1 – 2	Știința Timișoara	Bucharest
EET (UTC+02)				Stadium: Republicii; Referee: Petre Badea

5 August 1956 Round 13	Locomotiva Timișoara	4 – 3	CCA București	Timișoara
EET (UTC+02)				Stadium: CFR; Referee: Stefan Ionescu

12 August 1956 Round 14	CCA București	3 – 1	Dinamo Orașul Stalin	Bucharest
EET (UTC+02)				Stadium: Republicii; Referee: Solomon Seagal

19 August 1956 Round 15	Energia Ploiești	3 – 0	CCA București	Ploiești
EET (UTC+02)				Stadium: Ilie Oană; Referee: Petre Kroner

30 August 1956 Round 17	Locomotiva București	2 – 4	CCA București	Bucharest
EET (UTC+02)				Stadium: Giulești-Valentin Stănescu; Referee: Mircea Crutescu

16 September 1956 Round 18	CCA București	4 – 3	Dinamo București	Bucharest
EET (UTC+02)				Stadium: Republicii; Referee: Vili Maicanescu

23 September 1956 Round 19	Știința Cluj	0 – 0	CCA București	Cluj-Napoca
EET (UTC+02)				Stadium: Ion Moina; Referee: Lucian Paunescu

27 September 1956 Round 16	CCA București	6 – 0	Minerul Petroșani	Bucharest
EET (UTC+02)				Stadium: Republicii; Referee: Vladimir Fieru

30 September 1956 Round 20	CCA București	0 – 1	Dinamo Bacău	Bucharest
EET (UTC+02)				Stadium: Republicii; Referee: Mircea Crutescu

7 October 1956 Round 21	Progresul București	1 – 4	CCA București	Bucharest
EET (UTC+02)				Stadium: Dr. Staicovici; Referee: Constantin Popescu

11 October 1956 Round 22	Flamura Roșie Arad	0 – 1	CCA București	Arad
EET (UTC+02)				Stadium: Francisc von Neuman; Referee: Dumitru Schulder

11 November 1956 Round 26	CCA București	6 – 0	Locomotiva Timișoara	Bucharest
EET (UTC+02)				Stadium: Republicii; Referee: Solomon Seagal

15 November 1956 Round 23	CCA București	5 – 0	Progresul Oradea	Bucharest
EET (UTC+02)				Stadium: Republicii; Referee: Cornel Nitescu

18 November 1956 Round 25	Știința Timișoara	5 – 0	CCA București	Timișoara
EET (UTC+02)				Referee: Constantin Popescu

=== Cupa României ===
==== Results ====
13 September 1956 Round of 32	Dinamo Bârlad	0 – 4	CCA București	Bârlad
EET (UTC+02)

22 November 1956 Round of 16	Știința Cluj	1 – 5	CCA București	Cluj-Napoca
EET (UTC+02)				Stadium: Ion Moina

25 November 1956 Quarter-finals	Energia Metalul Galaţi	1 – 8	CCA București	Galaţi
EET (UTC+02)

2 December 1956 Semi-finals	CCA București	2 – 2 (a.e.t.)	Progresul Oradea	Bucharest
EET (UTC+02)			Karikaș (??)	Stadium: Republicii

== See also ==
- 1956 Cupa României
- 1956 Divizia A
