= 1957–58 FC Steaua București season =

CCA București
1957–58 season
- Manager: Ilie Savu, Angelo Niculescu
- Stadium: Republicii / 23 August
- Divizia A: 2nd
- Cupa României: Quarter-finals
- European Cup: First round
- Danube Cup: Round of 16
- Top goalscorer: Ion Alecsandrescu (15)

The 1957–58 season was FC Steaua București's 10th season since its founding in 1947.

== Divizia A ==
=== League table ===
Pos	Team	Pld	W	D	L	GF	GA	GD	Pts	Qualification or relegation
1	Petrolul Ploiești (C)	22	12	3	7	36	22	+14	27	Qualification to European Cup preliminary round
2	CCA București	22	11	5	6	41	27	+14	27	Qualification to 1958 Danube Cup
3	Știința Timișoara	22	11	5	6	49	38	+11	27	Qualification to 1958 Danube Cup
4	Progresul București	22	13	0	9	55	31	+24	26	
5	Minerul Petroșani	22	11	4	7	27	19	+8	26	

Source: LT
Rules for classification: 1) points; 2) goal average; 3) number of goals scored
(C) Champions

=== Results ===
17 August 1957 Round 1	CCA București	3 – 0	Petrolul Ploiești	Bucharest
EET (UTC+02)				Stadium: Republicii; Referee: Aurel Man

25 August 1957 Round 2	UTA Arad	1 – 1	CCA București	Arad
EET (UTC+02)				Stadium: Francisc von Neuman; Referee: Petre Badea

1 September 1957 Round 3	CCA București	3 – 1	Progresul București	Bucharest
EET (UTC+02)				Stadium: Republicii; Referee: Adalbert Varga

5 September 1957 Round 4	CCA București	1 – 4	Știința Timișoara	Bucharest
EET (UTC+02)				Stadium: Republicii; Referee: Sigmund Lupu

8 September 1957 Round 5	Dinamo Cluj	1 – 2	CCA București	Cluj-Napoca
EET (UTC+02)				Referee: Dumitru Schulder

3 October 1957 Round 7	CCA București	3 – 1	Minerul Petroșani	Bucharest
EET (UTC+02)				Stadium: Republicii; Referee: Aurel Maier

6 October 1957 Round 8	Progresul Oradea	0 – 3	CCA București	Oradea
EET (UTC+02)				Stadium: Iuliu Bodola; Referee: Emil Bucse

9 October 1957 Round 9	Dinamo București	3 – 2	CCA București	Bucharest
EET (UTC+02)				Stadium: Dinamo; Referee: Constantin Mitran

7 November 1957 Round 10	CCA București	2 – 2	Steagul Roşu Oraşul Stalin	Bucharest
EET (UTC+02)				Stadium: Republicii; Referee: Mihai Popa

15 December 1957 Round 6	CCA București	1 – 3	Locomotiva București	Bucharest
EET (UTC+02)				Stadium: Republicii; Referee: Vili Maicanescu

9 March 1958 Round 11	Energia Recolta Târgu Mureş	1 – 1	CCA București	Târgu Mureş
EET (UTC+02)				Referee: Gheorghe Keppich

16 March 1958 Round 12	Petrolul Ploiești	1 – 0	CCA București	Ploiești
EET (UTC+02)				Stadium: Ilie Oană; Referee: Dumitru Rusu

23 March 1958 Round 13	CCA București	1 – 1	UTA Arad	Bucharest
EET (UTC+02)				Stadium: Republicii; Referee: Gheorghe Osiac

30 March 1958 Round 14	Progresul București	1 – 2	CCA București	Bucharest
EET (UTC+02)				Stadium: Dr. Staicovici; Referee: Constantin Mitran

13 April 1958 Round 15	Știința Timișoara	3 – 0	CCA București	Timișoara
EET (UTC+02)				Referee: Dumitru Schulder

20 April 1958 Round 16	CCA București	6 – 0	Dinamo Cluj	Bucharest
EET (UTC+02)				Stadium: Republicii; Referee: Dumitru Rusu

4 May 1958 Round 17	Locomotiva București	0 – 0	CCA București	Bucharest
EET (UTC+02)				Stadium: Giulești-Valentin Stănescu; Referee: Stefan Ionescu

11 May 1958 Round 18	Minerul Petroșani	0 – 2	CCA București	Petroșani
EET (UTC+02)				Stadium: Jiul; Referee: Aurel Iftimie

18 May 1958 Round 19	CCA București	3 – 1	Progresul Oradea	Bucharest
EET (UTC+02)				Stadium: Republicii; Referee: Francisc Mateescu

5 June 1958 Round 20	CCA București	2 – 0	Dinamo București	Bucharest
EET (UTC+02)				Stadium: Republicii; Referee: Gheorghe Keppich

8 June 1958 Round 21	Steagul Roşu Oraşul Stalin	3 – 0	CCA București	Oraşul Stalin
EET (UTC+02)				Stadium: Silviu Ploeșteanu; Referee: Ion Dobrin

15 June 1958 Round 22	CCA București	3 – 0	Energia Recolta Târgu Mureş	Bucharest
EET (UTC+02)				Stadium: Republicii; Referee: Emil Bucse

== Cupa României ==
=== Results ===
6 April 1958 Round of 32	CCA București	7 – 1	Flacăra Moreni	Bucharest
EET (UTC+02)				Stadium: Republicii

27 April 1958 Round of 16	CCA București	8 – 0	Tractorul Brașov	Bucharest
EET (UTC+02)				Stadium: Republicii

12 June 1958 Quarter-finals	CS Oradea	3 – 1	CCA București	Oradea
EET (UTC+02)				Stadium: Iuliu Bodola

== European Cup ==
=== First round ===
27 November 1957 First leg	Borussia Dortmund (West Germany)	4–2	(Romania) CCA București	Dortmund
	Peters 35', 62', 64'; Niepieklo 66'	Report	Zavoda I 43'; Bone 50'	Stadium: Rote Erde; Attendance: 42,000; Referee: Javk Mowat (Scotland

8 December 1957 Second leg	CCA București (Romania)	3–1 (5–5 agg.)	(West Germany) Borussia Dortmund	Bucharest
EET (UTC+02)	Tătaru 17'; Constantin 25'; Alecsandrescu 45'	Report	Niepieklo 12'	Stadium: 23 August; Attendance: 60,000; Referee: Janos Posa-polareczky (Hungary)

29 December 1957 Play-off	Borussia Dortmund (West Germany)	3–1	(Romania) CCA București	Bologna
	Dulz 15'; Kelbassa 62'; Preißler 79'	Report	Cacoveanu 35'	Stadium: Stadio Comunale; Attendance: 8,000; Referee: Cesare Jonni (Italy)

== Danube Cup ==
=== Round of 16 ===
25 May 1958 First leg	CCA București (Romania)	2–3	(Hungary) MTK	Bucharest
				Stadium: 23 August

31 May 1958 Second leg	MTK (Hungary)	6–2 (9–4 agg.)	(Romania) CCA București	Budapest
EET (UTC+02)				Stadium: Hidegkuti Nándor

== See also ==
- 1957–58 Cupa României
- 1957–58 Divizia A
- 1957–58 European Cup
- 1958 Danube Cup
