= 1959–60 FC Steaua București season =

CCA București
1959–60 season
- Manager: Gheorghe Popescu I
- Stadium: Republicii / 23 August
- Divizia A: Champions
- Cupa României: Quarter-finals
- Top goalscorer: Gheorghe Constantin (20)

The 1959–60 season was FC Steaua București's 12th season since its founding in 1947.

== Divizia A ==
=== League table ===
Pos	Team	Pld	W	D	L	GF	GA	GD	Pts	Qualification or relegation
1	CCA București (C)	22	15	4	3	52	25	+27	34	Qualification to European Cup preliminary round
2	Steagul Roşu Oraşul Stalin	22	9	9	4	47	34	+13	27	Invitation to Balkans Cup
3	Petrolul Ploiești	22	8	8	6	33	23	+10	24	
4	Farul Constanța	22	9	6	7	37	34	+3	24	
5	Știința Cluj	22	7	10	5	34	32	+2	24	

Source: LT
Rules for classification: 1) points; 2) goal average; 3) number of goals scored
(C) Champions

=== Results ===
16 August 1959 1	CCA București	2 – 0	Jiul Petroșani	Bucharest
EET (UTC+02)				Stadium: Republicii; Referee: Nicolae Vizireanu

23 August 1959 2	Petrolul Ploiești	1 – 2	CCA București	Ploiești
EET (UTC+02)				Stadium: Ilie Oană; Referee: Dumitru Rusu

6 September 1959 3	Dinamo București	2 – 1	CCA București	Bucharest
EET (UTC+02)				Stadium: Dinamo; Referee: Stefan Ionescu

13 September 1959 4	CCA București	3 – 2	Farul Constanța	Bucharest
EET (UTC+02)				Stadium: Republicii; Referee: Alexandru Toth

20 September 1959 5	Steagul Roşu Oraşul Stalin	2 – 1	CCA București	Oraşul Stalin
EET (UTC+02)				Stadium: Tineretului; Referee: Octavian Comsa

27 September 1959 6	Rapid București	2 – 5	CCA București	Bucharest
EET (UTC+02)				Stadium: Giulești-Valentin Stănescu; Referee: Dumitru Schulder

11 October 1959 7	CCA București	6 – 1	Minerul Lupeni	Bucharest
EET (UTC+02)				Stadium: Republicii; Referee: Constantin Ianopol

11 October 1959 8	Dinamo Bacău	1 – 2	CCA București	Bacău
EET (UTC+02)				Referee: Cornel Nitescu

25 October 1959 9	Progresul București	1 – 4	CCA București	Bucharest
EET (UTC+02)				Stadium: Dr. Staicovici; Referee: Andrei Radulescu

15 November 1959 10	CCA București	1 – 0	UTA Arad	Bucharest
EET (UTC+02)				Stadium: Republicii; Referee: Ion Dobrin

22 November 1959 11	Știința Cluj	2 – 1	CCA București	Cluj-Napoca
EET (UTC+02)				Stadium: Ion Moina; Referee: Gheorghe Osiac

6 March 1960 12	Jiul Petroșani	1 – 2	CCA București	Petroșani
EET (UTC+02)				Stadium: Jiul; Referee: Cornel Nitescu

13 March 1960 13	CCA București	1 – 0	Petrolul Ploiești	Bucharest
EET (UTC+02)				Stadium: Republicii; Referee: Constantin Mitran

20 March 1960 14	CCA București	3 – 3	Dinamo București	Bucharest
EET (UTC+02)	Alecsandrescu ??'; Constantin ??', ??'			Stadium: 23 August; Referee: Vasile Dumitrescu

27 March 1960 15	Farul Constanța	0 – 3	CCA București	Constanța
EET (UTC+02)				Stadium: Farul; Referee: Gheorghe Osiac

3 April 1960 16	CCA București	2 – 1	Steagul Roşu Oraşul Stalin	Bucharest
EET (UTC+02)				Stadium: Republicii; Referee: Dumitru Schulder

10 April 1960 17	CCA București	1 – 1	Rapid București	Bucharest
EET (UTC+02)				Stadium: 23 August; Referee: Constantin Mitran

17 April 1960 18	Minerul Lupeni	0 – 1	CCA București	Lupeni
EET (UTC+02)				Stadium: Minerul; Referee: Octavian Comsa

8 May 1960 19	CCA București	3 – 0	Dinamo Bacău	Bucharest
EET (UTC+02)				Stadium: Republicii; Referee: Petre Kroner

2 June 1960 20	CCA București	2 – 2	Progresul București	Bucharest
EET (UTC+02)				Stadium: 23 August; Referee: Andrei Radulescu

19 June 1960 22	CCA București	2 – 2	Știința Cluj	Bucharest
EET (UTC+02)				Stadium: Republicii; Referee: Dumitru Rusu

3 July 1960 21	UTA Arad	1 – 4	CCA București	Arad
EET (UTC+02)				Stadium: Francisc von Neuman; Referee: Alexandru Toth

== Cupa României ==
=== Results ===
29 November 1959 Round of 32	CCA București	5 – 0	Poiana Câmpina	Bucharest
EET (UTC+02)				Stadium: Republicii

6 December 1959 Round of 16	CCA București	8 – 0	Metalul Titanii București	Bucharest
EET (UTC+02)				Stadium: Republicii

22 June 1960 Quarter-finals	Progresul București	3 – 1	CCA București	Bucharest
EET (UTC+02)				Stadium: Dr. Staicovici

== See also ==
- 1959–60 Cupa României
- 1959–60 Divizia A
