= 1958–59 FC Steaua București season =

CCA București
1958–59 season
- Manager: Gheorghe Popescu I
- Stadium: Republicii / 23 August
- Divizia A: 3rd
- Cupa României: Quarter-finals
- Top goalscorer: Ion Alecsandrescu (13)

The 1958–59 season was FC Steaua București's 11th season since its founding in 1947.

== Divizia A ==
=== League table ===
Pos	Team	Pld	W	D	L	GF	GA	GD	Pts	Qualification or relegation
1	Petrolul Ploiești (C)	22	15	1	6	47	23	+24	31	Qualification to European Cup preliminary round
2	Dinamo București	22	13	4	5	47	27	+20	30	
3	CCA București	22	12	5	5	35	26	+9	29	
4	Rapid București	22	11	4	7	46	28	+18	26	
5	Dinamo Bacău	22	9	5	8	32	35	−3	23	

Source: LT
Rules for classification: 1) points; 2) goal average; 3) number of goals scored
(C) Champions

=== Results ===
24 August 1958 Round 1	Știința Cluj	1–1	CCA București	Cluj-Napoca
EET (UTC+02)				Stadium: Ion Moina; Referee: Alexandru Toth

31 August 1958 Round 2	CCA București	2–0	Știința Timișoara	Bucharest
EET (UTC+02)				Stadium: Republicii; Referee: Stelian Mataizer

5 October 1958 Round 5	CCA București	2–1	Petrolul Ploiești	Bucharest
EET (UTC+02)				Stadium: Republicii; Referee: Nicolae Mihailescu

12 October 1958 Round 6	CCA București	0-2	Dinamo București	Bucharest
EET (UTC+02)				Stadium: Republicii; Referee: Dumitru Schulder

5 November 1958 Round 7	Steagul Roşu Oraşul Stalin	1–3	CCA București	Oraşul Stalin
EET (UTC+02)				Stadium: Silviu Ploeșteanu; Referee: Nicolae Vizireanu

9 November 1958 Round 8	CCA București	1–2	Dinamo Bacău	Bucharest
EET (UTC+02)				Stadium: Republicii; Referee: Octavian Comsa

12 November 1958 Round 3	Rapid București	2–3	CCA București	Bucharest
EET (UTC+02)				Stadium: Giulești-Valentin Stănescu; Referee: Mihai Popa

16 November 1958 Round 9	CCA București	2–1	Progresul București	Bucharest
EET (UTC+02)				Stadium: Republicii; Referee: Ioan Chiritescu

19 November 1958 Round 10	Jiul Petroșani	1–1	CCA București	Petroșani
EET (UTC+02)				Stadium: Jiul; Referee: Gheorghe Osiac

23 November 1958 Round 11	CCA București	2–1	UTA Arad	Bucharest
EET (UTC+02)				Stadium: Republicii; Referee: Dumitru Schulder

17 December 1958 Round 4	Farul Constanța	1–3	CCA București	Constanța
EET (UTC+02)				Stadium: Farul; Referee: Mihai Marinciu

15 March 1959 Round 12	CCA București	2–2	Știința Cluj	Bucharest
EET (UTC+02)				Stadium: Republicii; Referee: Octavian Comsa

22 March 1959 Round 13	Știința Timișoara	0–1	CCA București	Timișoara
EET (UTC+02)				Referee: Alexandu Toth

29 March 1959 Round 14	CCA București	4–0	Rapid București	Bucharest
EET (UTC+02)				Stadium: Republicii; Referee: Solomon Seagal

5 April 1959 Round 15	CCA București	1–1	Farul Constanța	Bucharest
EET (UTC+02)				Stadium: Republicii; Referee: Mihai Marta

3 May 1959 Round 16	Petrolul Ploiești	6–1	CCA București	Ploiești
EET (UTC+02)				Stadium: Ilie Oană; Referee: Dumitru Rusu

10 May 1959 Round 17	Dinamo București	0–1	CCA București	Bucharest
EET (UTC+02)			Alecsandrescu ??'	Stadium: Dinamo; Referee: Vasile Dumitrescu

17 May 1959 Round 18	CCA București	1–0	Steagul Roşu Oraşul Stalin	Bucharest
EET (UTC+02)				Stadium: Republicii; Referee: Gheorghe Osiac

24 May 1959 Round 19	Dinamo Bacău	1–0	CCA București	Bacău
EET (UTC+02)				Referee: Aurel Iftimie

31 May 1959 Round 20	Progresul București	1–3	CCA București	Bucharest
EET (UTC+02)				Stadium: Dr. Staicovici; Referee: Stefan Ionescu

7 June 1959 Round 21	CCA București	0–1	Jiul Petroșani	Bucharest
EET (UTC+02)				Stadium: Republicii; Referee: Dumitru Rusu

10 June 1959 Round 22	UTA Arad	1–1	CCA București	Arad
EET (UTC+02)				Stadium: Francisc von Neuman; Referee: Alexandru Toth

== Cupa României ==
=== Results ===
8 March 1959 Round of 32	CCA București	8–1	Unirea Focșani	Bucharest
EET (UTC+02)				Stadium: Republicii

1 April 1959 Round of 16	CCA București	3–1	Steagul Roşu Oraşul Stalin	Bucharest
EET (UTC+02)				Stadium: Republicii

20 May 1959 Quarter-finals	Dinamo București	3–1	CCA București	Bucharest
EET (UTC+02)				Stadium: Dinamo

== See also ==
- 1958–59 Cupa României
- 1958–59 Divizia A
