= 1950 FC Steaua București season =

CCA București
1950 season
- Manager: Ferenc Rónay
- Stadium: Republicii
- Divizia A: 5th
- Cupa României: Winners
- Top goalscorer: Nicolae Drăgan; Petre Moldoveanu (7)

The 1950 season was FC Steaua București's 3rd season since its founding in 1947.

This year the club changed the name again, for the third season in a row. It changed to CCA București (Casa Centrală a Armatei – Central House of the Army).

== Divizia A ==
=== League table ===
Pos	Team	Pld	W	D	L	GF	GA	GD	Pts
3	Știința Timișoara	22	9	7	6	30	37	−7	25
4	Locomotiva Timișoara	22	11	2	9	40	28	+12	24
5	CCA București	22	8	8	6	37	26	+11	24
6	Partizanul Petroșani	22	7	8	7	39	38	+1	22
7	ICO Oradea	22	8	6	8	32	34	−2	22

Source: LT
Rules for classification: 1) points; 2) goal average; 3) number of goals scored

=== Results ===
19 March 1950 Round 1	Dinamo București	2 – 2	CCA București	Bucharest
EET (UTC+02)	Farkaș 37' (pen.), 56'		N. Drăgan 33', 63'	Referee: Kroner Petre

26 March 1950 Round 2	CCA București	3 – 1	Progresul Oradea	Bucharest
EET (UTC+02)				Stadium: Republicii

2 April 1950 Round 3	Partizanul București	2 – 2	CCA București	Bucharest
EET (UTC+02)				Referee: Alexandriu Stefan

9 April 1950 Round 4	CCA București	2 – 0	Metalul Reşiţa	Bucharest
EET (UTC+02)				Stadium: Republicii; Referee: Ionescu Stefan

16 April 1950 Round 5	Ştiinţa Timișoara	1 – 3	CCA București	Timișoara
EET (UTC+02)				Referee: Bogdan Andrei

23 April 1950 Round 6	CCA București	0 – 2	Flamura Roşie Arad	Bucharest
EET (UTC+02)				Stadium: Republicii; Referee: Geac Stefan

28 May 1950 Round 7	Locomotiva Sibiu	0 – 3	CCA București	Sibiu
EET (UTC+02)				Stadium: IPA Sibiu; Referee: Man Aurel

3 June 1950 Round 8	CCA București	1 – 0	Locomotiva București	Bucharest
EET (UTC+02)				Stadium: Republicii; Referee: Bogdan Andrei

11 June 1950 Round 9	Locomotiva Târgu Mureş	0 – 0	CCA București	Târgu Mureş
EET (UTC+02)

18 June 1950 Round 10	CCA București	1 – 2	Partizanul Petroşani	Bucharest
EET (UTC+02)				Stadium: Republicii; Referee: Geac Stefan

25 June 1950 Round 11	CCA București	1 – 1	Locomotiva Timișoara	Bucharest
EET (UTC+02)				Stadium: Republicii; Referee: Man Aurel

13 August 1950 Round 12	CCA București	0 – 1	Dinamo București	Bucharest
EET (UTC+02)				Stadium: Republicii; Referee: Alexandriu Stefan

20 August 1950 Round 13	Progresul Oradea	2 – 1	CCA București	Oradea
EET (UTC+02)				Stadium: Iuliu Bodola; Referee: Kincs Adalbert

26 August 1950 Round 14	CCA București	1 – 1	Partizanul București	Bucharest
EET (UTC+02)				Stadium: Republicii; Referee: Segal Solomon

3 September 1950 Round 15	Metalul Reşiţa	2 – 2	CCA București	Reșița
EET (UTC+02)				Stadium: Mircea Chivu; Referee: Freund Emerich

1 October 1950 Round 16	CCA București	5 – 1	Ştiinţa Timișoara	Bucharest
EET (UTC+02)				Stadium: Republicii; Referee: Ionescu Gheorghe

15 October 1950 Round 17	Flamura Roşie Arad	1 – 1	CCA București	Arad
EET (UTC+02)				Stadium: Francisc von Neuman; Referee: Mayer Jules

19 October 1950 Round 18	CCA București	0 – 1	Locomotiva Sibiu	Bucharest
EET (UTC+02)				Stadium: Republicii; Referee: Takacs Dezideriu

28 October 1950 Round 19	Locomotiva București	2 – 4	CCA București	Bucharest
EET (UTC+02)				Stadium: Giulești; Referee: Mayer Jules

5 November 1950 Round 20	CCA București	2 – 0	Locomotiva Târgu Mureş	Bucharest
EET (UTC+02)				Stadium: Republicii; Referee: Man Aurel

12 November 1950 Round 21	Partizanul Petroşani	1 – 1	CCA București	Petroșani
EET (UTC+02)				Referee: Marco Alvarez Moreno

19 November 1950 Round 22	Locomotiva Timișoara	3 – 2	CCA București	Timișoara
EET (UTC+02)				Stadium: CFR; Referee: Kincs Adalbert

== Cupa României ==
=== Results ===
2 July 1950 Round of 32	Locomotiva PCA Constanţa	0 – 3	CCA București	Constanţa
EET (UTC+02)

17 August 1950 Round of 16	CSU Iaşi	2 – 4	CCA București	Iași
EET (UTC+02)

11 October 1950 Quarter-finals	CCA București	4 – 2	Dinamo Oraşul Stalin	Bucharest
EET (UTC+02)				Stadium: Republicii

1 November 1950 Semi-finals	Locomotiva Sibiu	0 – 2	CCA București	Sibiu
EET (UTC+02)				Stadium: IPA Sibiu

26 November 1950 Final	CCA București	3 – 1	Flamura Roşie Arad	Bucharest
14:00 EET (UTC+02)	Apolzan 44' (pen.); Roman 72'; Moldoveanu 90'	Report	Mercea 89'	Stadium: Republicii; Attendance: 25,000; Referee: Andrei Bölöni (Oraşul Stalin)
