= 1951 FC Steaua București season =

CCA București
1951 season
- Manager: Gheorghe Popescu I
- Stadium: Republicii
- Divizia A: Champions
- Cupa României: Winners
- Top goalscorer: Nicolae Drăgan; Petre Moldoveanu; Petre Bădeanțu (9)

The 1951 season was FC Steaua București's 4th season since its founding in 1947.

== Divizia A ==
=== League table ===
Pos	Team	Pld	W	D	L	GF	GA	GD	Pts	Qualification or relegation
1	CCA București (C)	22	13	6	3	43	19	+24	32	Champions of Romania
2	Dinamo București	22	14	4	4	52	29	+23	32	
3	Progresul Oradea	22	11	4	7	46	36	+10	26	
4	Flamura Roșie Arad	22	8	8	6	37	31	+6	24	
5	Flacăra București	22	8	6	8	36	40	−4	22	

Source: LT
Rules for classification: 1) points; 2) goal average; 3) number of goals scored
(C) Champions

=== Results ===
25 March 1951 Round 1	CCA București	2 – 1	Știința Cluj	Bucharest
EET (UTC+02)				Stadium: Republicii; Referee: Popescu Panait

1 April 1951 Round 2	Locomotiva Târgu Mureș	0 – 3	CCA București	Târgu Mureș
EET (UTC+02)				Referee: Boloni Andrei

8 April 1951 Round 3	CCA București	3 – 0	Dinamo Orașul Stalin	Bucharest
EET (UTC+02)				Stadium: Republicii; Referee: Korch Martin

15 April 1951 Round 4	Știința Timișoara	0 – 1	CCA București	Timișoara
EET (UTC+02)				Referee: Iftimie Aurel

22 April 1951 Round 5	CCA București	2 – 0	Flamura Roșie Arad	Bucharest
EET (UTC+02)				Stadium: Republicii; Referee: Kroner Petre

6 May 1951 Round 6	CCA București	2 – 1	Dinamo București	Bucharest
EET (UTC+02)				Stadium: Republicii; Referee: Kroner Petre

17 May 1951 Round 7	Locomotiva București	1 – 2	CCA București	Bucharest
EET (UTC+02)				Stadium: Giulești; Referee: Schulder Dumitru

3 June 1951 Round 8	Progresul Oradea	1 – 1	CCA București	Oradea
EET (UTC+02)				Stadium: Iuliu Bodola; Referee: Marco Alvarez Moreno

10 June 1951 Round 9	CCA București	7 – 0	Locomotiva Timișoara	Bucharest
EET (UTC+02)				Stadium: Republicii; Referee: Alexandriu Stefan

16 June 1951 Round 10	CCA București	0 – 0	Flacăra București	Bucharest
EET (UTC+02)				Stadium: Republicii; Referee: Geac Stefan

24 June 1951 Round 11	Flacăra Petroșani	1 – 1	CCA București	Petroșani
EET (UTC+02)				Referee: Boloni Andrei

26 August 1951 Round 12	Știința Cluj	3 – 1	CCA București	Cluj-Napoca
EET (UTC+02)				Stadium: Ion Moina; Referee: Marco Alvarez Moreno

2 September 1951 Round 13	CCA București	2 – 0	Locomotiva Târgu Mureș	Bucharest
EET (UTC+02)				Stadium: Republicii; Referee: Popa Mihai

9 September 1951 Round 14	Dinamo Orașul Stalin	1 – 1	CCA București	Orașul Stalin
EET (UTC+02)				Referee: Daju Savu

16 September 1951 Round 15	CCA București	1 – 0	Știința Timișoara	Bucharest
EET (UTC+02)				Stadium: Republicii; Referee: Schulder Dumitru

23 September 1951 Round 16	Flamura Roșie Arad	0 – 1	CCA București	Arad
EET (UTC+02)				Stadium: Francisc von Neuman; Referee: Ionescu Gheorghe

1 October 1951 Round 17	Dinamo București	6 – 2	CCA București	Bucharest
EET (UTC+02)	Lutz 5'; Nicolae 36'; Ene 54', 57', 71'; Suru 73'		Moldoveanu 68' (pen.); Ferenczi 82'	Referee: Boloni Andrei

6 October 1951 Round 18	CCA București	0 – 1	Locomotiva București	Bucharest
EET (UTC+02)				Stadium: Republici; Referee: Mitran Constantin

13 October 1951 Round 19	CCA București	4 – 2	Progresul Oradea	Bucharest
EET (UTC+02)				Stadium: Republicii; Referee: Schulder Dumitru

21 October 1951 Round 20	Locomotiva Timișoara	1 – 1	CCA București	Timișoara
EET (UTC+02)				Stadium: CFR; Referee: Boloni Andrei

28 October 1951 Round 21	Flacăra București	0 – 6	CCA București	Bucharest
EET (UTC+02)				Referee: Ionescu Gheorghe

4 November 1951 Round 22	CCA București	0 – 0	Flacăra Petroșani	Bucharest
EET (UTC+02)				Stadium: Republicii; Referee: Geac Stefan

== Cupa României ==
=== Results ===
27 June 1951 Round of 32	Locomotiva Galați	0 – 9	CCA București	Galați
EET (UTC+02)

1 July 1951 Round of 16	Flamura Roșie Buhuși	1 – 8	CCA București	Buhuși
EET (UTC+02)

5 September 1951 Quarter-finals	CCA București	2 – 1	Metalul Sibiu	Bucharest
EET (UTC+02)				Stadium: Republici

1 November 1951 Semi-finals	CCA București	3 – 1 (a.e.t.)	Știința Timișoara	Bucharest
EET (UTC+02)				Stadium: Republici

8 November 1951 Final	CCA București	3 – 1 (a.e.t.)	Flacăra Mediaș	Bucharest
14:30 EET (UTC+02)	Drăgan 49', 111'; Moldoveanu 112'	Report	Coman 71'	Stadium: Republicii; Attendance: 25,000; Referee: Gheorghe Ionescu (Orașul Stalin)

== See also ==
- 1951 Cupa României
- 1951 Divizia A
