= 1947–48 FC Steaua București season =

ASA București
1947–48 season
- Manager: Coloman Braun-Bogdan, Colea Vâlcov
- Stadium: Venus / ANEF / Republicii
- Divizia A: 14th
- Cupa României: Round of 16
- Top goalscorer: Gheorghe Popescu I (10)

The 1947–48 season was CSA Steaua București's 1st season since its founding in 1947.

The club was founded as ASA București (Asociația Sportivă a Armatei București – Army Sports Association).

== Divizia A ==
=== League table ===
Pos	Team	Pld	W	D	L	GF	GA	GD	Pts	Qualification or relegation
12	CSM Mediaș (O)	30	10	5	15	48	77	−29	25	Qualification to relegation play-offs
13	FC Ploiești (R)	30	10	4	16	48	86	−38	24	Qualification to relegation play-offs
14	ASA București (O)	30	8	6	16	44	66	−22	22	Qualification to relegation play-offs
15	Unirea Tricolor București (R)	30	8	5	17	51	86	−35	21	Relegation to Divizia B
16	UD Reșița (R)	30	7	4	19	45	90	−45	18	Relegation to Divizia B

Source: LT
Rules for classification: 1) points; 2) goal average; 3) number of goals scored
(O) Play-off winners; (R) Relegated

=== League results summary ===
Overall								Home						Away					
Pld	W	D	L	GF	GA	GD	Pts	W	D	L	GF	GA	GD	W	D	L	GF	GA	GD
30	8	6	16	44	66	−22	30	4	3	8	19	24	−5	4	3	8	25	42	−17

Last updated: 24 June 2017 (UTC).

- Note: At that time there were 2 points per win, giving a total of 22 pts.

=== Results ===
24 August 1947 Round 1	ASA București	0 – 0	Dermata Cluj	Bucharest
EET (UTC+02)		Report		Stadium: Stadionul Venus; Referee: Vartolomeu Virgil

31 August 1947 Round 2	ASA București	0 – 0	Ciocanul București	Bucharest
EET (UTC+02)		Report		Stadium: Stadionul Venus; Referee: Fianu Stefan

4 September 1947 Round 3	CFR Timișoara	7 – 1	ASA București	Timișoara
EET (UTC+02)		Report		Stadium: Stadionul CFR; Referee: Chiciu Aurel

11 September 1947 Round 4	ASA București	1 – 2	Universitatea Cluj	Bucharest
EET (UTC+02)		Report		Stadium: Stadionul Venus; Referee: Cristea Marin

14 September 1947 Round 5	ITA Arad	7 – 0	ASA București	Arad
EET (UTC+02)		Report		Stadium: Francisc von Neuman; Referee: Sipos Stefan

28 September 1947 Round 6	ASA București	1 – 2	FC Ploiești	Bucharest
EET (UTC+02)		Report		Stadium: ANEF; Referee: Vasilescu Bartolomeu

2 October 1947 Round 7	RATA Târgu Mureş	3 – 1	ASA București	Târgu Mureș
EET (UTC+02)		Report		Referee: Copia Ioan

19 October 1947 Round 8	ASA București	3 – 0	Oţelul Reşiţa	Bucharest
EET (UTC+02)		Report		Stadium: ANEF; Referee: Rusu Gabriel

30 October 1947 Round 9	Distribuţia București	1 – 3	ASA București	Bucharest
EET (UTC+02)		Report		Referee: Fianu Stefan

9 November 1947 Round 11	CSM Mediaş	4 – 3	ASA București	Mediaş
EET (UTC+02)		Report		Stadium: Municipal Gaz Metan; Referee: Feher Nicolae

16 November 1947 Round 12	ASA București	0 – 1	CFR Cluj	Bucharest
EET (UTC+02)		Report		Stadium: ANEF; Referee: Seratzki Enric

23 November 1947 Round 13	Jiul Petroșani	3 – 3	ASA București	Petroșani
EET (UTC+02)		Report		Referee: Rosenblum Max

30 November 1947 Round 14	ASA București	2 – 1	CA Oradea	Bucharest
EET (UTC+02)		Report		Stadium: ANEF; Referee: Ionescu Tope A

4 December 1947 Round 10	ASA București	0 – 1	CFR București	Bucharest
EET (UTC+02)		Report	Lungu 1'	Stadium: ANEF; Attendance: 20,000; Referee: Cristea Marin

14 December 1947 Round 15	Unirea Tricolor București	4 – 5	ASA București	Bucharest
EET (UTC+02)		Report		Referee: Gorcea Mihail

8 February 1948 Round 16	Dermata Cluj	1 – 2	ASA București	Cluj-Napoca
EET (UTC+02)		Report		Stadium: Stadionul Clujana; Referee: Reinhardt Stefan

14 February 1948 Round 17	Ciocanul București	0 – 0	ASA București	Bucharest
EET (UTC+02)		Report		Stadium: Calea Dudeşti; Referee: Mitran Constantin

22 February 1948 Round 18	ASA București	2 – 4	CFR Timișoara	Bucharest
EET (UTC+02)		Report		Stadium: Stadionul Republicii; Referee: Alexandriu Stefan

29 February 1948 Round 19	Universitatea Cluj	2 – 0	ASA București	Cluj-Napoca
EET (UTC+02)		Report		Stadium: Stadionul Ion Moina; Referee: Crutescu Mircea

7 March 1948 Round 20	ASA București	1 – 6	ITA Arad	Bucharest
EET (UTC+02)		Report		Stadium: Stadionul Republicii; Referee: Man Aurel

14 March 1948 Round 21	FC Ploiești	3 – 2	ASA București	Ploiești
EET (UTC+02)		Report		Referee: Kroner Petre

20 March 1948 Round 22	ASA București	2 – 0	RATA Târgu Mureş	Bucharest
EET (UTC+02)		Report		Stadium: Stadionul Republicii; Referee: Ceaureanu Iancu

1 April 1948 Round 24	ASA București	1 – 2	Distribuţia București	Bucharest
EET (UTC+02)		Report		Stadium: Stadionul Republicii; Referee: Sobcovici W.

4 April 1948 Round 25	CFR București	2 – 0	ASA București	Bucharest
EET (UTC+02)		Report		Stadium: Stadionul Giulești; Referee: Iliescu Constantin Tica

8 April 1948 Round 23	Oţelul Reşiţa	1 – 2	ASA București	Reşiţa
EET (UTC+02)		Report		Stadium: Stadionul Municipal; Referee: Mitran Constantin

11 April 1948 Round 26	ASA București	3 – 0	CSM Mediaş	Bucharest
EET (UTC+02)		Report		Stadium: Stadionul Republicii; Referee: Freund Emerich

18 April 1948 Round 27	CFR Cluj	2 – 1	ASA București	Cluj-Napoca
EET (UTC+02)		Report		Stadium: Ferar; Referee: Popescu Constantin

25 April 1948 Round 28	ASA București	1 – 3	Jiul Petroşani	Bucharest
EET (UTC+02)		Report		Stadium: Stadionul Republicii; Referee: Cristea Marin

29 April 1948 Round 29	CA Oradea	2 – 2	ASA București	Oradea
EET (UTC+02)		Report		Stadium: Stadionul Municipal; Referee: Freund Emerich

9 May 1948 Round 30	ASA București	2 – 2	Unirea Tricolor București	Bucharest
EET (UTC+02)		Report		Stadium: Stadionul Republicii; Referee: Iliescu Constantin Tica

== Cupa României ==
=== Results ===
17 March 1948 Round of 32	CFR Buzău	2 – 4	ASA București	Buzău
EET (UTC+02)

21 April 1948 Round of 16	CAM Timișoara	3 – 1	ASA București	Timișoara
EET (UTC+02)
