= 1961–62 FC Steaua București season =

Steaua București
1961–62 season
- Manager: Eugen Mladin; Gheorghe Popescu I
- Stadium: Republicii / 23 August
- Divizia A: 9th
- Cupa României: Winners
- European Cup: Preliminary round
- Top goalscorer: Gheorghe Constantin (24)

The 1961–62 season was Romanian football team FC Steaua București's 14th season since its founding in 1947.

For this season, the club's name changed once again, after 11 years under the name CCA, it changed to CSA Steaua București (Clubul Sportiv al Armatei Steaua – Army Sports Club Steaua), shorted as Steaua București. This name marks the club's history, under which it makes great performances though becoming one of the Europe's grands.

== Divizia A ==
=== League table ===
Pos	Team	Pld	W	D	L	GF	GA	GD	Pts	Qualification or relegation
7	Știința Cluj	26	10	6	10	46	44	+2	26	
8	Știința Timișoara	26	10	5	11	38	42	−4	25	
9	Steaua București	26	10	4	12	53	45	+8	24	Qualification to Cup Winners' Cup preliminary round
10	UTA Arad	26	9	6	11	42	41	+1	24	
11	Minerul Lupeni	26	11	1	14	25	51	−26	23	

Source: LT
Rules for classification: 1) points; 2) goal average; 3) number of goals scored

=== Results ===
20 August 1961 1	Steaua București	2–6	Petrolul Ploiești	Bucharest
EET (UTC+02)				Stadium: 23 August; Referee: Nicolae Mihailescu

27 August 1961 2	Știința Cluj	2–2	Steaua București	Cluj-Napoca
EET (UTC+02)				Stadium: Ion Moina; Referee: Anton Galambos

3 September 1961 3	Steaua București	0–1	Progresul București	Bucharest
EET (UTC+02)				Stadium: 23 August; Referee: Mihai Popa

10 September 1961 4	Steaua București	4–0	Jiul Petroșani	Bucharest
EET (UTC+02)				Stadium: Republicii; Referee: Zaharia Draghici

17 September 1961 5	Metalul Târgoviște	2–2	Steaua București	Târgoviște
EET (UTC+02)				Referee: Ion Dobrin

15 October 1961 8	Minerul Lupeni	2–1	Steaua București	Lupeni
EET (UTC+02)				Stadium: Minerul; Referee: Gheorghe Osiac

26 October 1961 6	Steaua București	2–1	Dinamo Pitești	Bucharest
EET (UTC+02)				Stadium: Republicii; Referee: Romulus Sabau

29 October 1961 9	Steaua București	6–2	Știința Timișoara	Bucharest
EET (UTC+02)				Stadium: Republicii; Referee: Adrian Macovei

1 November 1961 7	Dinamo București	1–1	Steaua București	Bucharest
EET (UTC+02)	David 1'		Constantin 85' (pen.)	Stadium: Dinamo; Referee: Mircea Crutescu

11 November 1961 10	Steagul Roşu Brașov	1–0	Steaua București	Brașov
EET (UTC+02)				Stadium: Tineretului; Referee: Zaharia Draghici

16 November 1961 11	Steaua București	1–2	Rapid București	Bucharest
EET (UTC+02)				Stadium: 23 August; Referee: Aurel Bentu

19 November 1961 12	Steaua București	4–2	UTA Arad	Bucharest
EET (UTC+02)				Stadium: Republicii

26 November 1961 13	Dinamo Bacău	2–0	Steaua București	Bacău
EET (UTC+02)				Referee: Constantin Geana

18 March 1962 14	Petrolul Ploiești	2–3	Steaua București	Ploiești
EET (UTC+02)				Stadium: Ilie Oană; Referee: Zaharia Draghici

25 March 1962 15	Steaua București	1–2	Știința Cluj	Bucharest
EET (UTC+02)				Stadium: Republicii; Referee: Stavru Nicolau

1 April 1962 16	Progresul București	4–3	Steaua București	Bucharest
EET (UTC+02)				Stadium: Dr. Staicovici; Referee: Nicolae Mihailescu

8 April 1962 17	Jiul Petroșani	1–1	Steaua București	Petroșani
EET (UTC+02)				Stadium: Jiul; Referee: Cornel Nitescu

15 April 1962 18	Steaua București	4–0	Metalul Târgoviște	Bucharest
EET (UTC+02)				Stadium: Republicii; Referee: Constantin Geana

22 April 1962 19	Dinamo Pitești	3–1	Steaua București	Pitești
EET (UTC+02)				Referee: Petre Malita

30 April 1962 20	Steaua București	0–1	Dinamo București	Bucharest
EET (UTC+02)			Varga 59' (pen.)	Stadium: 23 August; Referee: Mihai Popa

13 May 1962 21	Steaua București	3–0	Minerul Lupeni	Bucharest
EET (UTC+02)				Stadium: Republicii; Referee: Adrian Macovei

27 May 1962 22	Știința Timișoara	2–3	Steaua București	Timișoara
EET (UTC+02)				Stadium: Dan Păltinișanu; Referee: Alexandru Toth

3 June 1962 23	Steaua București	4–2	Steagul Roşu Brașov	Bucharest
EET (UTC+02)				Stadium: Republicii; Referee: Zaharia Draghici

10 June 1962 24	Rapid București	2–1	Steaua București	Bucharest
EET (UTC+02)				Stadium: Giulești-Valentin Stănescu; Referee: Mircea Crutescu

24 June 1962 25	UTA Arad	2–1	Steaua București	Arad
EET (UTC+02)				Stadium: Francisc von Neuman

1 July 1962 26	Steaua București	3–0	Dinamo Bacău	Bucharest
EET (UTC+02)				Stadium: Republicii; Referee: Anton Galambos

== Cupa României ==
=== Results ===
20 May 1962 Round of 32	Arieșul Turda	0–2	Steaua București	Turda
EET (UTC+02)

24 May 1962 Round of 16	Steaua București	3–1	Chimia Govora	Bucharest
EET (UTC+02)				Stadium: Republicii

17 June 1962 Quarter-finals	Steaua București	3–1 (a.e.t.)	Dinamo Bacău	Bucharest
EET (UTC+02)				Stadium: Republicii

27 June 1962 Semi-finals	Steaua București	7–1	Steagul Roşu Braşov	Bucharest
EET (UTC+02)				Stadium: Republicii

8 July 1962 Final	Steaua București	5–1	Rapid București	Bucharest
17:30 EET (UTC+02)	Mateianu 11'; Voinea 40'; Constantin 47', 64'; Raksi 85'	Report	Ozon 15'	Stadium: 23 August; Attendance: 70,000; Referee: Alexandru Tóth (Oradea)

== European Cup ==
=== Preliminary round ===
21 September 1961 First leg	Steaua București (Romania)	0–0	Austria Wien	Bucharest
EET (UTC+02)		Report		Stadium: 23 August; Attendance: 40,000; Referee: Konstantin Zečević (Yugoslavia)

28 September 1961 Second leg	Austria Wien	2–0 (2–0 agg.)	(Romania) Steaua București	Vienna
EET (UTC+02)	Stotz 38' (pen.); Nemec 40'	Report		Stadium: Praterstadion; Attendance: 38,490; Referee: Branko Tesanić (Yugoslavia)

== See also ==
- 1961–62 European Cup
- 1961–62 Cupa României
- 1961–62 Divizia A
