= 1952 FC Steaua București season =

CCA București
1952 season
- Manager: Gheorghe Popescu I
- Stadium: Republicii
- Divizia A: Champions
- Cupa României: Winners
- Top goalscorer: Victor Moldovan (10)

The 1952 season was FC Steaua București's 5th season since its founding in 1947.

== Friendly matches ==
Win Draw Loss

1952 Friendly	CCA București (Romania)	0–0	(Bulgaria) C.D.N.V. Sofia	Bucharest, Romania
EET (UTC+2)				Stadium: Republicii

1952 Friendly	CCA București (Romania)	2–2	(Belgium) La Gantoise	Bucharest, Romania
EET (UTC+2)				Stadium: Republicii

=== Divizia A ===
==== League table ====
Pos	Team	Pld	W	D	L	GF	GA	GD	Pts	Qualification or relegation
1	CCA București (C)	22	15	6	1	46	16	+30	36	Champions of Romania
2	Dinamo București	22	14	6	2	51	23	+28	34	
3	CA Câmpulung Moldovenesc	22	10	5	7	36	25	+11	25	
4	Locomotiva Târgu Mureş	22	9	5	8	37	35	+2	23	
5	Știința Cluj	22	7	7	8	24	23	+1	21	

Source: LT
Rules for classification: 1) points; 2) goal average; 3) number of goals scored
(C) Champions

==== Results ====
16 March 1952 Round 1	CCA București	3 – 0	Metalul Câmpia Turzii	Bucharest
EET (UTC+02)				Stadium: Republicii; Referee: Mitran Constantin

23 March 1952 Round 2	Dinamo Oraşul Stalin	2 – 2	CCA București	Oraşul Stalin
EET (UTC+02)				Referee: Schonbrun

30 March 1952 Round 3	CCA București	3 – 1	CA Câmpulung Moldovenesc	Bucharest
EET (UTC+02)				Stadium: Republicii; Referee: Takacs Dezideriu

6 April 1952 Round 4	Flacăra Ploieşti	1 – 2	CCA București	Ploieşti
EET (UTC+02)				Stadium: Ilie Oană; Referee: Geac Stefan

13 April 1952 Round 5	CCA București	2 – 1	Flamura Roşie Arad	Bucharest
EET (UTC+02)				Stadium: Republicii; Referee: Popescu Cristian

20 April 1952 Round 6	Flacăra Petroşani	1 – 3	CCA București	Petroşani
EET (UTC+02)				Referee: Man Aurel

17 August 1952 Round 7	CCA București	1 – 1	Dinamo București	Bucharest
EET (UTC+02)				Stadium: Republicii; Referee: Segal Solomon

24 August 1952 Round 8	CCA București	1 – 1	Ştiinţa Cluj	Bucharest
EET (UTC+02)				Stadium: Republicii; Referee: Popescu Panait

31 August 1952 Round 9	Locomotiva Târgu Mureş	0 – 1	CCA București	Târgu Mureş
EET (UTC+02)				Referee: Boloni Andrei

4 September 1952 Round 10	Locomotiva Timișoara	1 – 1	CCA București	Timișoara
EET (UTC+02)				Stadium: CFR; Referee: Man Aurel

7 September 1952 Round 11	CCA București	2 – 2	Progresul Oradea	Bucharest
EET (UTC+02)				Stadium: Republicii; Referee: Popa Mihai

14 September 1952 Round 12	Metalul Câmpia Turzii	1 – 2	CCA București	Câmpia Turzii
EET (UTC+02)				Stadium: Mihai Adam; Referee: Bogdan Andrei

20 September 1952 Round 13	CCA București	1 – 0	Dinamo Oraşul Stalin	Bucharest
EET (UTC+02)				Stadium: Republicii; Referee: Daju Savu

28 September 1952 Round 14	CA Câmpulung Moldovenesc	1 – 3	CCA București	Câmpulung Moldovenesc
EET (UTC+02)				Referee: Sipos Stefan

5 October 1952 Round 15	CCA București	3 – 0	Flacăra Ploieşti	Bucharest
EET (UTC+02)				Stadium: Republicii; Referee: Boloni Andrei

12 October 1952 Round 16	Flamura Roşie Arad	1 – 3	CCA București	Arad
EET (UTC+02)				Stadium: Francisc von Neuman; Referee: Tepeneag

19 October 1952 Round 17	CCA București	4 – 0	Flacăra Petroşani	Bucharest
EET (UTC+02)				Stadium: Republicii; Referee: Bogdan Andrei

2 November 1952 Round 18	Dinamo București	1 – 0	CCA București	Bucharest
EET (UTC+02)				Stadium: Dinamo; Referee: Boloni Andrei

9 November 1952 Round 19	Ştiinţa Cluj	0 – 2	CCA București	Cluj-Napoca
EET (UTC+02)				Stadium: Ion Moina; Referee: Florut Gheorghe

16 November 1952 Round 20	CCA București	3 – 0	Locomotiva Târgu Mureş	Bucharest
EET (UTC+02)				Stadium: Republicii; Referee: Szego Nicolae

23 November 1952 Round 21	CCA București	4 – 1	Locomotiva Timișoara	Bucharest
EET (UTC+02)				Stadium: Republicii; Referee: Florut Gheorghe

27 November 1952 Round 22	Progresul Oradea	0 – 0	CCA București	Oradea
EET (UTC+02)				Stadium: Iuliu Bodola; Referee: Glameanu Constantin

=== Cupa României ===
==== Results ====
11 September 1952 Round of 32	CA Cluj	0 – 3	CCA București	Cluj-Napoca
EET (UTC+02)

1 October 1952 Round of 16	Dinamo Bacău	2 – 6	CCA București	Bacău
EET (UTC+02)

15 October 1952 Quarter-finals	CCA București	2 – 1	Locomotiva Oradea	Bucharest
EET (UTC+02)				Stadium: Republicii

3 December 1952 Semi-finals	CCA București	3 – 2	Dinamo București	Bucharest
EET (UTC+02)				Stadium: Republicii

7 December 1952 Final	CCA București	2 – 0	Flacăra Ploieşti	Bucharest
13:15 EET (UTC+02)	Moldovan 9'; Drăgan 56'	Report		Stadium: Republicii; Attendance: 15,000; Referee: Andrei Bölöni (Oraşul Stalin)

== See also ==
- 1952 Cupa României
- 1952 Divizia A
