= 1948–49 FC Steaua București season =

CSCA București
1948–49 season
- Manager: Colea Vâlcov
- Stadium: Republicii
- Divizia A: 6th
- Cupa României: Winners
- Top goalscorer: Petre Moldoveanu (10)

The 1948–49 season was FC Steaua București's 2nd season since its founding in 1947.

For this season, the club's name changed to CSCA București (Clubul Sportiv Central al Armatei – Central Sports Club of the Army).

== Divizia A ==
=== League table ===
Pos	Team	Pld	W	D	L	GF	GA	GD	Pts
4	RATA Târgu Mureș	26	13	4	9	51	37	+14	30
5	CFR Timișoara	26	12	6	8	47	30	+17	30
6	CSCA București	26	10	9	7	58	53	+5	29
7	Petrolul București	26	11	7	8	47	37	+10	29
8	Dinamo București	26	11	6	9	55	50	+5	28

Source: LT
Rules for classification: 1) points; 2) goal difference; 3) number of goals scored

=== Results ===
21 August 1948 Round 1	CFR București	5 – 2	CSCA București	Bucharest
EET (UTC+02)				Stadium: Giulești; Referee: Iliescu Constantin Tica

29 August 1948 Round 2	CSCA București	3 – 2	CSU Cluj	Bucharest
EET (UTC+02)				Stadium: Republicii; Referee: Reinhardt Stefan

5 September 1948 Round 3	CSU Timișoara	6 – 0	CSCA București	Timișoara
EET (UTC+02)				Referee: Grigore Sandu

16 September 1948 Round 4	CSCA București	3 – 3	IC Oradea	Bucharest
EET (UTC+02)				Stadium: Republicii

19 September 1948 Round 5	RATA Târgu Mureş	3 – 2	CSCA București	Târgu Mureş
EET (UTC+02)				Referee: Sipos Stefan

28 September 1948 Round 6	CSCA București	0 – 0	Petrolul București	Bucharest
EET (UTC+02)				Stadium: Republicii; Referee: Petrescu Jean

3 October 1948 Round 7	ITA Arad	3 – 3	CSCA București	Arad
EET (UTC+02)				Stadium: Francisc von Neuman; Referee: Dragomirescu Gheorghe

17 October 1948 Round 8	Jiul Petroşani	2 – 2	CSCA București	Petroșani
EET (UTC+02)				Referee: Alexandriu Stefan

7 November 1948 Round 9	CSCA București	1 – 4	CFR Cluj	Bucharest
EET (UTC+02)				Stadium: Republicii; Referee: Kroner Petre

14 November 1948 Round 10	CFR Timișoara	1 – 3	CSCA București	Timișoara
EET (UTC+02)				Referee: Rusu Gabriel

21 November 1948 Round 11	CSCA București	0 – 1	Dinamo București	Bucharest
EET (UTC+02)			M. Apostol (?)	Stadium: Republicii; Referee: Ceaureanu Iancu

28 November 1948 Round 12	Metalochimic București	2 – 7	CSCA București	Bucharest
EET (UTC+02)				Referee: Negut Ioan

5 December 1948 Round 13	CSCA București	3 – 0	Gaz Metan Mediaş	Bucharest
EET (UTC+02)				Stadium: Republicii; Referee: Rosenblum Max

26 February 1949 Round 14	CSCA București	1 – 1	CFR București	Bucharest
EET (UTC+02)				Stadium: Republicii; Referee: Vartolomeu Virgil

20 March 1949 Round 15	CSU Cluj	0 – 0	CSCA București	Cluj-Napoca
EET (UTC+02)				Stadium: Ion Moina; Referee: Bogdan Andrei

26 March 1949 Round 16	CSCA București	5 – 4	CSU Timișoara	Bucharest
EET (UTC+02)				Stadium: Republicii; Referee: Kroner Emil

3 April 1949 Round 17	IC Oradea	2 – 1	CSCA București	Oradea
EET (UTC+02)				Stadium: Iuliu Bodola

10 April 1949 Round 18	CSCA București	0 – 1	RATA Târgu Mureş	Bucharest
EET (UTC+02)				Stadium: Republicii; Referee: Daju Savu

16 April 1949 Round 19	Petrolul București	2 – 3	CSCA București	Bucharest
EET (UTC+02)				Referee: Copia Ioan

29 May 1949 Round 20	CSCA București	4 – 3	ITA Arad	Bucharest
EET (UTC+02)				Stadium: Republicii; Referee: Schonbrun

5 June 1949 Round 21	CSCA București	3 – 1	Jiul Petroşani	Bucharest
EET (UTC+02)				Stadium: Republicii; Referee: Daju Savu

12 June 1949 Round 22	CFR Cluj	1 – 1	CSCA București	Cluj-Napoca
EET (UTC+02)				Stadium: Ferar; Referee: Freund Emerich

19 June 1949 Round 23	CSCA București	3 – 1	CFR Timișoara	Bucharest
EET (UTC+02)				Stadium: Republicii; Referee: Bogdan Andrei

29 June 1949 Round 24	Dinamo București	3 – 3	CSCA București	Bucharest
EET (UTC+02)	Moisescu 30'; Farkaș 71' (pen.), 86'		N. Drăgan 25'; Hallasz 40'; Serfözö 49'	Referee: Geac Stefan

3 July 1949 Round 25	CSCA București	2 – 2	Metalochimic București	Bucharest
EET (UTC+02)				Stadium: Republicii; Referee: Negut Ioan

10 July 1949 Round 26	Gaz Metan Mediaş	0 – 3	CSCA București	Mediaş
EET (UTC+02)				Stadium: Municipal Gaz Metan; Referee: Boloni Andrei

== Cupa României ==
=== Results ===
4 September 1949 Round of 32	Hârtia Piatra Neamţ	1 – 7	CSCA București	Piatra Neamţ
EET (UTC+02)

3 November 1949 Round of 16	Arsenal Sibiu	0 – 3	CSCA București	Sibiu
EET (UTC+02)

5 November 1949 Quarter-finals	CSCA București	2 – 1	CFR București	Bucharest
EET (UTC+02)				Stadium: Republicii

15 December 1949 Semi-finals	CSCA București	5 – 0	CFR Sibiu	Bucharest
EET (UTC+02)				Stadium: Republicii

18 December 1949 Final	CSCA București	2 – 1	CSU Cluj	Bucharest
14:00 EET (UTC+02)	Moldoveanu 39'; Fernbach-Ferenczi 74'	Report	Zehan 68'	Stadium: ICAS; Attendance: 12,000; Referee: Adalbert Kincs (Lugoj)
