= 1953 FC Steaua București season =

CCA București
1953 season
- Manager: Gheorghe Popescu I
- Stadium: Republicii / 23 August
- Divizia A: Champions
- Cupa României: Runners-up
- Top goalscorer: Victor Moldovan (7)

The 1953 season was FC Steaua București's 6th season since its founding in 1947.

== Friendly matches ==
Win Draw Loss

22 November 1953 Friendly	CCA București (Romania)	1–0	(Soviet Union) Dynamo Tbilisi	Bucharest, Romania
EET (UTC+2)				Stadium: 23 August

=== Divizia A ===
==== League table ====
Pos	Team	Pld	W	D	L	GF	GA	GD	Pts	Qualification or relegation
1	CCA București (C)	21	11	6	4	27	14	+13	28	Champions of Romania
2	Dinamo București	21	10	5	6	37	29	+8	25	
3	Flamura Roșie Arad	21	9	6	6	31	24	+7	24	
4	Dinamo Orașul Stalin	21	7	9	5	35	27	+8	23	
5	Locomotiva București	21	5	11	5	23	22	+1	21	

Source: LT
Rules for classification: 1) points; 2) goal average; 3) number of goals scored
(C) Champions

==== Results ====
14 March 1953 Round 1	CCA București	2 – 1	Locomotiva Târgu Mureș	Bucharest
EET (UTC+02)				Stadium: Republicii; Referee: Keppich Gheorghe

22 March 1953 Round 2	CA Câmpulung Moldovenesc	2 – 1	CCA București	Câmpulung Moldovenesc
EET (UTC+02)				Referee: Lupu Sigmund

29 March 1953 Round 3	CCA București	1 – 1	Minerul Petroșani	Bucharest
EET (UTC+02)				Stadium: Republicii; Referee: Iftimie Aurel

5 April 1953 Round 4	Știința Cluj	0 – 2	CCA București	Cluj-Napoca
EET (UTC+02)				Stadium: Ion Moina; Referee: Daju Savu

12 April 1953 Round 5	CCA București	0 – 0	Flamura Roșie Arad	Bucharest
EET (UTC+02)				Stadium: Republicii; Referee: Boloni Andrei

22 April 1953 Round 6	Dinamo București	2 – 1	CCA București	Bucharest
EET (UTC+02)			Bone ??'	Stadium: Dinamo; Referee: Mitran Constantin

26 April 1953	Dinamo Orașul Stalin	canceled (3 – 4)	CCA București	Orașul Stalin
EET (UTC+02)

3 May 1953 Round 8	CCA București	1 – 0	Locomotiva București	Bucharest
EET (UTC+02)				Stadium: Republicii

6 May 1953 Round 7	CCA București	1 – 0	Dinamo Orașul Stalin	Bucharest
EET (UTC+02)				Stadium: Republicii

9 May 1953 Round 9	Știința Timișoara	0 – 1	CCA București	Timișoara
EET (UTC+02)				Referee: Szego Nicolae

13 May 1953 Round 10	Progresul Oradea	1 – 2	CCA București	Oradea
EET (UTC+02)				Stadium: Iuliu Bodola; Referee: Maier Aurel

17 May 1953 Round 11	CCA București	4 – 0	Locomotiva Timișoara	Bucharest
EET (UTC+02)				Stadium: Republicii; Referee: Crutescu Mircea

30 August 1953 Round 12	Locomotiva Târgu Mureș	0 – 3	CCA București	Târgu Mureș
EET (UTC+02)				Referee: Iftimie Aurel

13 September 1953 Round 14	Minerul Petroșani	1 – 0	CCA București	Petroșani
EET (UTC+02)				Stadium: Jiul; Referee: Szego Nicolae

20 September 1953 Round 15	CCA București	1 – 0	Știința Cluj	Bucharest
EET (UTC+02)				Stadium: 23 August; Referee: Kroner Emil

27 September 1953 Round 16	Flamura Roșie Arad	1 – 1	CCA București	Arad
EET (UTC+02)				Stadium: Francisc von Neuman; Referee: Varga Adalbert

6 October 1953 Round 17	CCA București	1 – 3	Dinamo București	Bucharest
EET (UTC+02)	Laurențiu ??'			Stadium: 23 August; Referee: Dumitrescu Gheorghe

11 October 1953 Round 18	CCA București	0 – 0	Dinamo Orașul Stalin	Bucharest
EET (UTC+02)				Stadium: 23 August

17 October 1953 Round 19	Locomotiva București	1 – 1	CCA București	Bucharest
EET (UTC+02)				Stadium: Giulești-Valentin Stănescu

25 October 1953 Round 20	CCA București	0 – 0	Știința Timișoara	Bucharest
EET (UTC+02)				Stadium: 23 August; Referee: Popa Mihai

1 November 1953 Round 21	CCA București	3 – 1	Progresul Oradea	Bucharest
EET (UTC+02)				Stadium: 23 August; Referee: Popescu Panait

8 November 1953 Round 22	Locomotiva Timișoara	0 – 1	CCA București	Timișoara
EET (UTC+02)				Stadium: CFR; Referee: Geac Stefan

=== Cupa României ===
==== Results ====
16 September 1953 Round of 32	Locomotiva Iaşi	0 – 2	CCA București	Iaşi
EET (UTC+02)

30 September 1953 Round of 16	CCA București	4 – 1	Spartac București	Bucharest
EET (UTC+02)				Stadium: 23 August

21 October 1953 Quarter-finals	Flacăra Ploieşti	1 – 2	CCA București	Ploieşti
EET (UTC+02)				Stadium: Ilie Oană

15 November 1953 Semi-finals	CCA București	1 – 0	Locomotiva București	Bucharest
EET (UTC+02)				Stadium: 23 August

29 November 1953 Final	Flamura Roşie Arad	1 – 0 (a.e.t.)	CCA București	Bucharest
12:00 EET (UTC+02)	Váczi 110'	Report		Stadium: 23 August; Attendance: 50,000; Referee: Mihai Popa (Bucharest)

== See also ==
- 1953 Cupa României
- 1953 Divizia A
