= 1955 Cupa României =

Tournament details
- Country: Romania

Final positions
- Champions: CCA București
- Runners-up: Progresul Oradea

The 1955 Cupa României was the 18th edition of Romania's most prestigious football cup competition.

The title was won by CCA București against Progresul Oradea.

== Format ==
The competition is an annual knockout tournament.

In the first round proper, two pots were made, first pot with Divizia A teams and other teams till 16 and the second pot with the rest of teams qualified in this phase. First pot teams will play away. Each tie is played as a single leg.

If a match is drawn after 90 minutes, the game goes in extra time, and if the scored is still tight after 120 minutes, the team who plays away will qualify.

In case the teams are from same city, there a replay will be played.

In case the teams play in the final, there a replay will be played.

From the first edition, the teams from Divizia A entered in competition in sixteen finals, rule which remained till today.

== First round proper ==
Team 1	Score	Team 2
13 October 1955
Dinamo Bacău (Div. B)	1–0	(Div. A) Progresul București
Dinamo Bârlad (Div. B)	0–2	(Div. A) Flacăra Ploiești
Locomotiva București (Div. B)	3–2 (a.e.t.)	(Div. A) Locomotiva Constanța
Metalul Câmpia Turzii (Div. B)	5–3	(Div. A) Locomotiva Târgu Mureș
Flacăra Câmpina (Div. B)	1–2	(Div. A) Dinamo Orașul Stalin
Metalul Cugir (Div. B)	1–2	(Div. A) Flamura Roșie Arad
Avântul Fălticeni (Div. B)	1–0 (a.e.t.)	(Div. A) Știința Cluj
Dinamo Galaţi (Div. B)	1–4	(Div. B) Progresul CPCS București
Metalul Hunedoara (Div. B)	2–1 (a.e.t.)	(Div. A) Minerul Petroșani
Flacăra Mediaş (Div. B)	1–0	(Div. A) Avântul Reghin
Locomotiva Oradea (Div. C)	2–1	(Div. B) Metalul Baia Mare
Progresul Oradea (Div. B)	4–1	(Div. A) Locomotiva Timișoara
Metalul Oţelu Roşu (Div. C)	3–2	(Div. A) Ştiinţa Timişoara
Locomotiva Paşcani (Div. C)	3–4	(Div. B) Dinamo 6 București
Dinamo Pitești (Div. C)	2–3	(Div. A) CCA București
Locomotiva Turnu Severin (Div. B)	0–5	(Div. A) Dinamo București

== Second round proper ==
Team 1	Score	Team 2
2 November 1955
Dinamo Bacău	0–3	CCA București
Locomotiva București	2–1	Flacăra Ploiești
Avântul Fălticeni	3–1	Progresul CPCS București
Metalul Hunedoara	4–4 (a.e.t.)	Flamura Roșie Arad
Flacăra Mediaş	2–3	Dinamo București
Locomotiva Oradea	1–3	Progresul Oradea
3 November 1955
Dinamo 6 București	0–1	Metalul Câmpia Turzii
Metalul Oţelu Roşu	0–5	Dinamo Orașul Stalin

== Quarter-finals ==
Team 1	Score	Team 2
23 November 1955
Flamura Roșie Arad	1–1 (a.e.t.)	Locomotiva București
CCA București	5–2	Metalul Câmpia Turzii
Avântul Fălticeni	0–1	Dinamo București
Progresul Oradea	2–1	Dinamo Orașul Stalin

== Semi-finals ==
Team 1	Score	Team 2
4 December 1955
Progresul Oradea	2–1	Dinamo București
11 December 1955
CCA București	4–0	Locomotiva București

== Final ==
18 December 1955
14:00 EET

CCA București	6–3 (a.e.t.)	Progresul Oradea
Zavoda 57'; Alecsandrescu 65', 108'; Moldovan 68'; Constantin 95'; Onisie 101'	Report	Tóth 45'; Florea 58'; Vlad 77'

Republicii, Bucharest
Attendance: 30,000
Referee: Dumitru Schulder (Bucharest)
