= Petre Moldoveanu =

Romanian footballer and manager

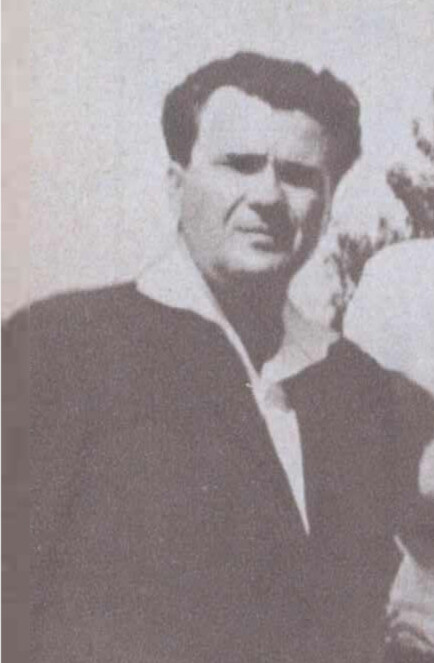
- Moldoveanu in 1966

Personal information
- Date of birth: 24 June 1925
- Place of birth: Bucharest, Romania
- Date of death: 30 November 2005 (aged 80)
- Place of death: Bucharest, Romania
- Position: Striker

Senior career*
Years	Team	Apps	(Gls)
1942–1946	Sportul Studențesc		
1946–1947	CFR Caracal		
1948–1955	CCA București	114	(35)
1955–1958	Progresul București		

International career
1949–1952	Romania	5	(0)

Managerial career
- 1963–1964: CS Târgoviște
- 1964–1965: Siderurgistul Galați
- 1965–1967: Progresul București
- 1971: Progresul București
- 1972–1973: CSM Suceava
- 1974–1977: Hafia
- 1975–1976: Guinea
- 1977–1978: Universitatea Cluj
- 1980–1981: Progresul București
- 1982–1983: Progresul București
- * Club domestic league appearances and goals

Petre Moldoveanu (24 June 1925 – 30 November 2005) was a Romanian footballer and manager. On 21 November 1948, he played in the first ever CSCA București – Dinamo București derby. He scored the first goal in the 2–1 victory against CSU Cluj in the 1949 Cupa României final, which helped CCA București win the first Cupa României in the club's history.

== International career ==
Moldoveanu played five friendly games at international level for Romania, making his debut in a 4–1 away victory against Albania.

== Honours ==
=== Player ===
Steaua București

- Divizia A: 1951, 1952, 1953
- Cupa României: 1948–49, 1950, 1951, 1952

=== Manager ===
Hafia

- Ligue 1 Pro: 1975, 1976, 1977
- African Cup of Champions Clubs: 1975, runner-up 1976

Guinea

- Africa Cup of Nations runner-up: 1976

Universitatea Cluj

- Divizia B: 1978–79

Progresul București

- Divizia B: 1979–80

== See also ==
- List of CAF club competition winning coaches
