= Mircea Chivu Stadium =

Multi-purpose stadium in Reşiţa, Romania

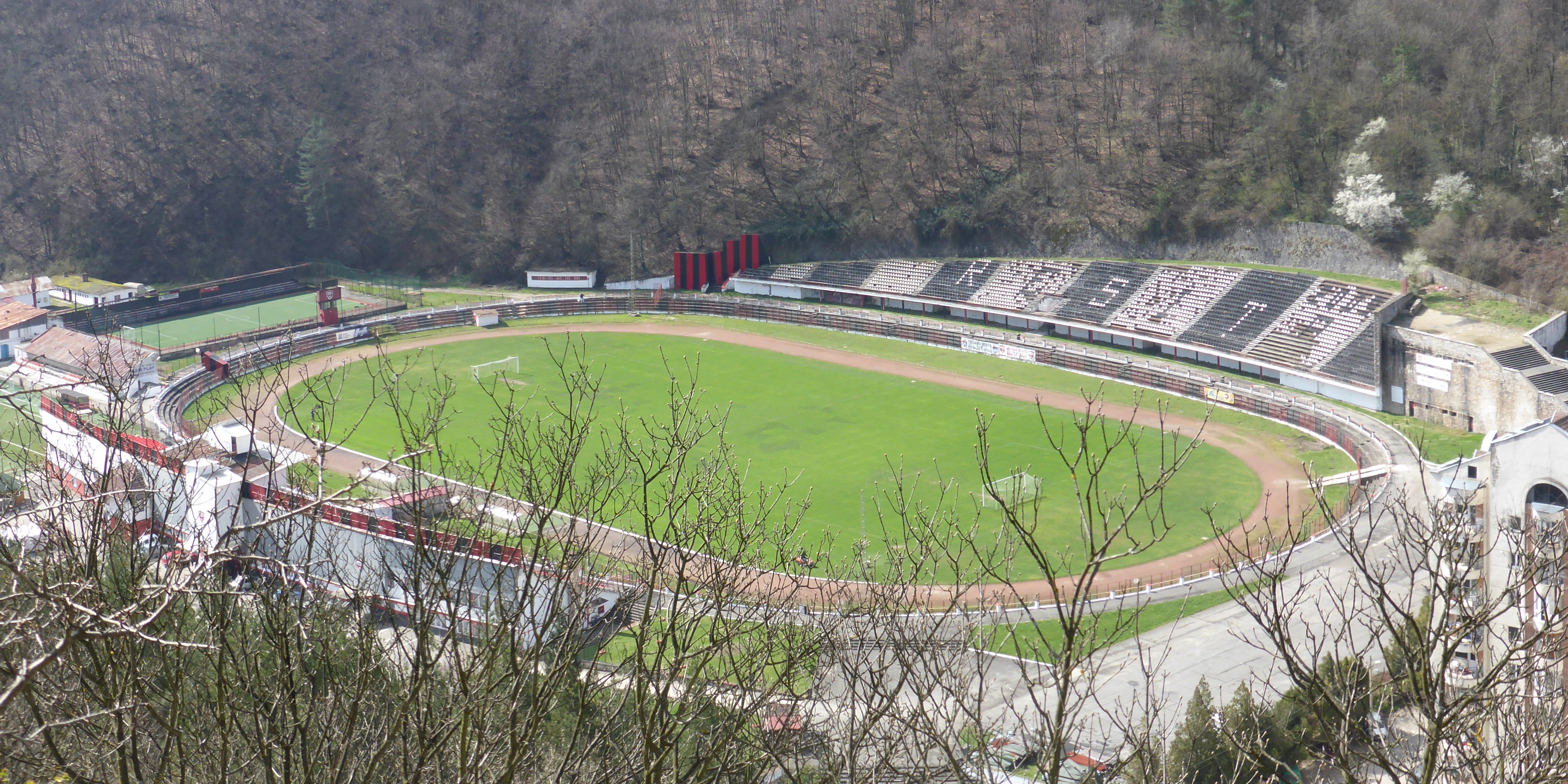
- Interactive map of Mircea Chivu Stadium
- Address: Str. Valea Domanului, nr. 1
- Location: Reșița, Romania
- Coordinates: 45°16′54″N 21°53′23″E
- Owner: Municipality of Reșița
- Operator: CSM Reșița
- Capacity: 12,500 seated
- Surface: Grass

Construction
- Opened: May 25, 1926; 100 years ago
- Renovated: 2009

Tenants
- CSM Reșița (1926–present); Metalul Reșița (2013–2016)

The Mircea Chivu Stadium is a multi-purpose stadium, located in Reșița, Romania. It has a capacity of 12,500 people and is the home ground of CSM Reșița. The stadium is named after Mircea Chivu, the father of soccer player Cristian Chivu, former captain of the Romania national football team.

== Stadionul Mircea Chivu ==
Stadionul Mircea Chivu is a multi-purpose sports stadium in Reșița, Romania, located in the Valea Domanului area of the city. It is the home ground of CSM Reșița and is one of the principal sporting venues in the city. The stadium and the surrounding sports complex have played an important role in the history of football in Reșița, hosting the club's home matches during numerous periods in the Romanian top divisions.

The sports complex in Valea Domanului was developed extensively during the 1950s. According to a municipal development document, the principal sports base was constructed between 1954 and 1958 and covered more than 48,000 square metres, with the work carried out with the participation of local residents. The complex subsequently became one of the most important sporting facilities in Reșița.

The stadium has traditionally been associated with football, but the wider complex has also included facilities for athletics and other sports. The football ground has a natural grass surface and has been reported with a capacity of up to 12,500 spectators. The stands were renovated in 2009, when seating was installed and the dressing rooms were refurbished.

The venue has undergone several periods of maintenance and renovation. In the late 2000s, parts of the stadium were refurbished after a period of deterioration, while further works were carried out on the playing surface and other facilities. These included the replacement of seats, improvements to drainage and the installation of an irrigation system.

The stadium was named in honour of Mircea Chivu, the former CSM Reșița player and manager and father of Romanian international Cristian Chivu. The naming established a lasting connection between Mircea Chivu and the club with which he was associated for much of his football career. The stadium is commonly referred to as the Mircea Chivu Stadium or Stadionul Mircea Chivu in Romanian sources.

In March 2025, the stadium hosted its first match under floodlights. The installation was completed shortly before the Liga II match between CSM Reșița and FC Argeș, played on 8 March 2025 in front of approximately 7,000 spectators. The match ended in a goalless draw and marked a new stage in the modernization of the historic venue.

The stadium remains the home of CSM Reșița and continues to be an important part of the city's sporting identity. Its long association with the club and its connection with the Chivu family have made the name of Mircea Chivu a permanent part of Reșița's football heritage.
