= Ilie Savu =

Romanian footballer

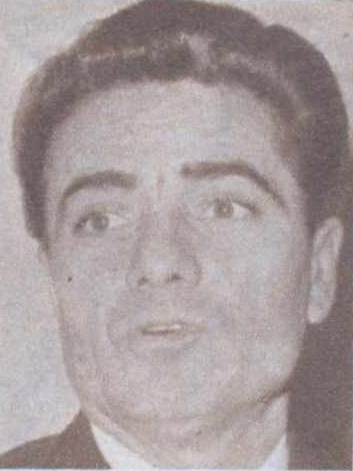

Personal information
- Full name: Ilie Savu
- Date of birth: 9 January 1920
- Place of birth: Cornățelu, Dâmbovița, Romania
- Date of death: 16 November 2010 (aged 90)
- Place of death: Bucharest, Romania
- Position: Goalkeeper

Senior career*
Years	Team	Apps	(Gls)
1934–1936	Prahova Ploiești		
1937–1942	Venus București		
1943–1947	Corvinul Deva		
1947–1950	Steaua București	14	(0)
Total		14	(0)

Managerial career
- 1953: Steaua București
- 1954–1955: Steaua București
- 1956: Steaua București (assistant)
- 1958: Steaua București
- 1964–1967: Steaua București
- 1975–1977: Corvinul Hunedoara
- 1978: Corvinul Hunedoara
- 1984–1985: Gloria Bistriţa
- * Club domestic league appearances and goals

Ilie Savu (9 January 1920 – 16 November 2010) was a Romanian footballer who played as a goalkeeper. He was Steaua București's first goalkeeper.

== Playing career ==
Born in Cornățelu, Dâmbovița County, Romania, Savu began his career at 14 years of age, playing as a striker and as a goalkeeper. He played two seasons for Prahova Ploiești before he moved to Bucharest, where he played five seasons for Venus București. In this period he also played two matches in the Romania national youth team. After Venus, he signed with Corvinul Deva where, in a period of four years, he played only a few matches because of the Second World War. After the war, he signed with Steaua București, being the goalkeeper of the first Steaua squad. He played three years for Steaua before his retirement.

== Manager career ==
He was the manager of Steaua's Gold Team in 1956 when the team won the championship and played in a tourney in England. After Steaua, he managed Corvinul Hunedoara and saw the team promoted into Liga I. He returned in 1964 to Steaua, but after only two years he left the team.

== Death ==
Savu died on 16 November 2010, shortly after midnight, at the Central Military Hospital in Bucharest, losing a battle with a hepatic disease.

== Honours ==
Player
Venus București

- Romanian League: 2
  - 1938–39, 1939–40

Manager
Steaua București

- Romanian League: 1
  - 1956 as co-trainer for Ştefan Dobay
- Romanian Cup: 2
  - 1965–66, 1966–67
