= Ștefan Onisie =

Romanian footballer and manager

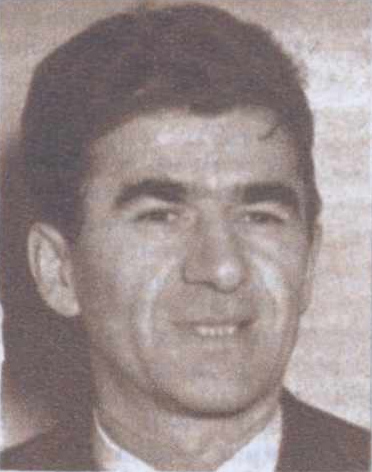

Personal information
- Date of birth: 23 November 1925
- Place of birth: Vulcan, Romania
- Date of death: 7 July 1984 (aged 58)
- Place of death: Cugir, Romania
- Position: Midfielder

Youth career
- 1937–1943: Minerul Lupeni

Senior career*
Years	Team	Apps	(Gls)
1943–1945	Minerul Lupeni		
1945–1947	AMEF Arad		
1948–1959	Steaua București (Note: The statistics for the 1957 unofficial championship called Cupa Primăverii are not taken into consideration.)	128	(5)
1951–1953	→ CA Câmpulung Moldovenesc (loan) (Note: The statistics for the 1951 Divizia B season are unavailable.)	30	(1)
Total		158	(6)

International career
1953–1956	Romania	6	(0)

Managerial career
- 1959–1960: Steaua București (assistant)
- 1960–1961: Steaua București
- 1962–1963: Steaua București
- 1963–1964: Steaua București (assistant)
- 1964–1965: Minerul Baia Mare
- 1965–1970: Steaua București (assistant)
- 1970–1971: Steaua București
- 1971–1973: Universitatea Cluj
- 1974: Olimpia Satu Mare (technical director)
- 1974–1975: Progresul Brăila
- 1975–1977: FCM Giurgiu
- 1977–1979: CFR Cluj
- 1979–1981: Metalurgistul Cugir
- 1981–1984: Strungul Arad
- * Club domestic league appearances and goals

Ștefan Onisie (23 November 1925 – 7 July 1984) was a Romanian footballer and manager. He was part of Steaua's Golden Team of the 1950s.

== International career ==
Onisie played six games at international level for Romania, making his debut in 1953 when coach Gheorghe Popescu I send him on the field at half-time to replace Titus Ozon in a 2–1 away victory against Bulgaria at the 1954 World Cup qualifiers in which he also appeared in a 1–0 loss against Czechoslovakia. In 1956, Onisie made his last appearance for the national team in a friendly which ended with a 2–0 away loss against Bulgaria.

== Honours ==
=== Player ===
Steaua București

- Romanian League (4): 1951, 1952, 1953, 1956
- Romanian Cup (3): 1949, 1950, 1955

==== Manager ====
Steaua București

- Romanian League (1): 1960–61

==== As assistant manager ====
Steaua București

- Romanian League (2): 1959–60, 1967–68
- Romanian Cup (5) 1965–66, 1966–67, 1968–69, 1969–70, 1970–71
