= Ion Alecsandrescu =

Romanian footballer and club president

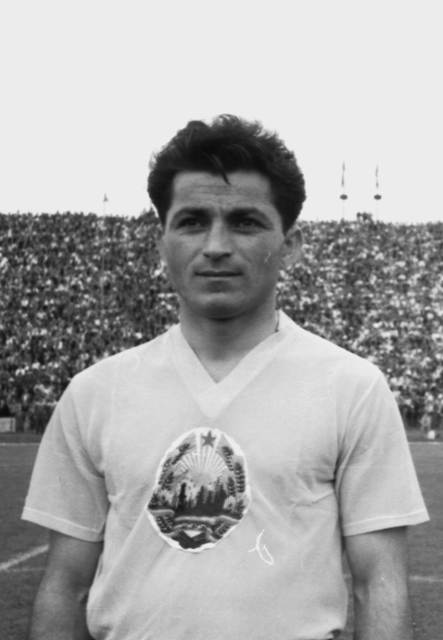
- Alecsandrescu in the 1950s

Personal information
- Date of birth: 17 July 1928
- Place of birth: Copăceni, Vâlcea, Romania
- Date of death: 21 June 2000 (aged 71)
- Place of death: Bucharest, Romania
- Height: 1.72 m (5 ft 8 in)
- Position: Striker

Youth career
- 1947–1949: Juventus București

Senior career*
Years	Team	Apps	(Gls)
1950	Partizanul București	6	(8)
1950–1951	Steaua București	6	(1)
1952–1953	CA Câmpulung Moldovenesc	32	(5)
1953–1961	Steaua București (Note: The 1957 championship called Cupa Primăverii is unofficial, so the appearances and goals scored at that competition for Steaua București are not official.)	153	(85)
1962	Olimpia București		
Total		198	(99)

International career
	Romania B	5	(0)
1956–1959	Romania (Note: Including one appearance for Romania's Olympic team)	5	(0)

Managerial career
- 1982–1989: Steaua București (president)
- * Club domestic league appearances and goals

Ion Alecsandrescu (17 July 1928 – 21 June 2000) was the president of Steaua București during the team's golden era, between 1985 and 1989. His nickname was Sfinxul (English: The Sphinx) and was recently declared as Steaua Bucharest's Man of the Century.

Alecsandrescu also played football between 1947 and 1962 for Juventus București, Steaua București, CA Câmpulung Moldovenesc and Olimpia București.

He was top scorer of Liga I with 18 goals in only 22 games, in 1956.

Alecsandrescu won five championships and a Cupa României, all with Steaua București and also won four caps for Romania and one for Romania's Olympic team.
