= Ilie Oană Stadium (1937) =

Romanian stadium

Coordinates: 44°56′25″N 26°2′0″E

Ilie Oană
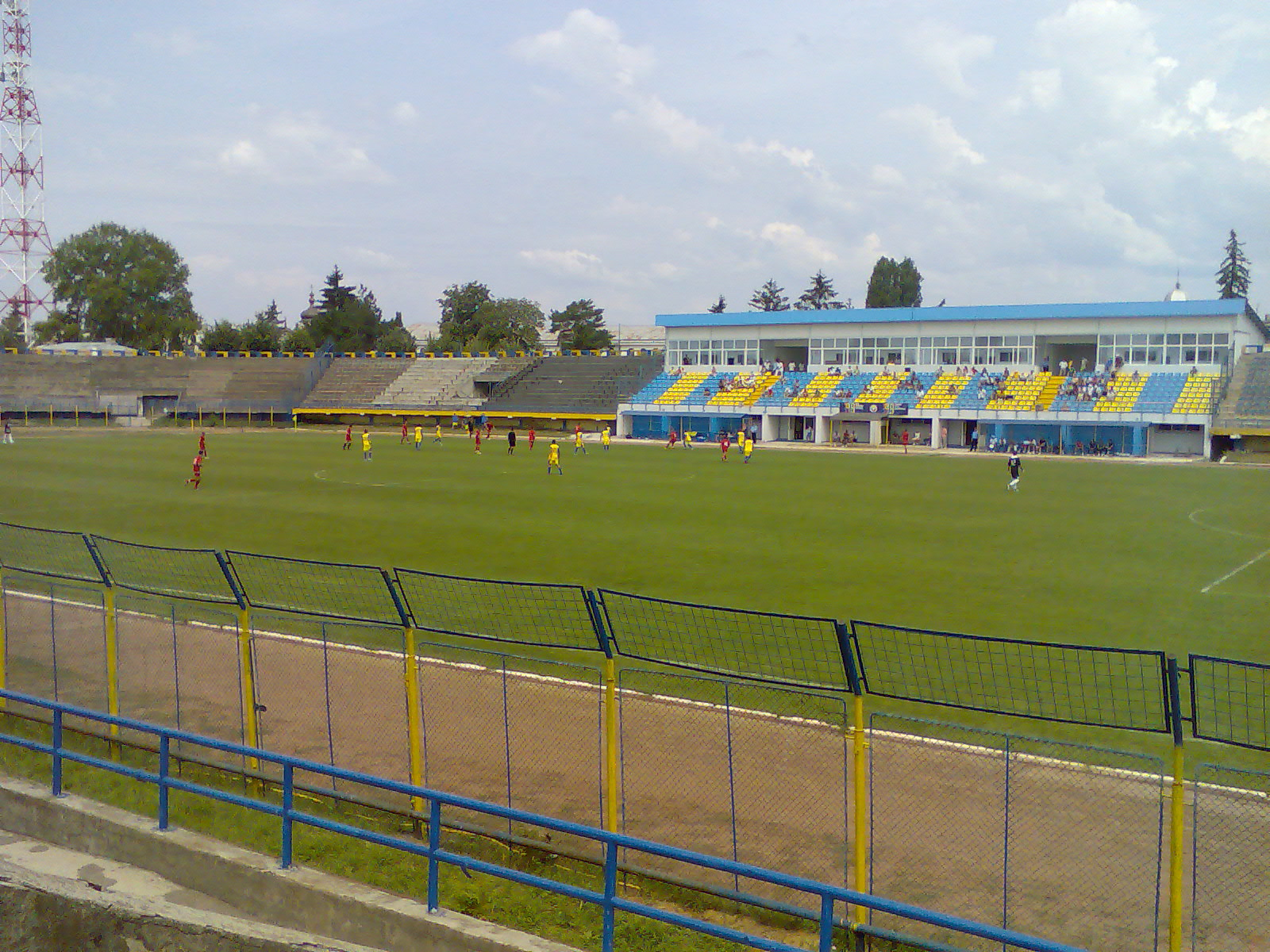
- Interactive map of Ilie Oană
- Location: Ploieşti, Romania
- Owner: Ploiești
- Operator: Petrolul Ploiești
- Capacity: 14,000
- Surface: Grass

Construction
- Opened: 1937
- Demolished: 2010

Tenant
- Petrolul Ploiești (1937–2010)

Stadionul Ilie Oană (1937) was a multi-purpose stadium in Ploieşti, Romania. It was used mostly for football matches and was the home ground of FC Petrolul Ploieşti. The stadium used to hold up to 14,000 people before it was demolished.

The stadium was named after Ilie Oană, a Romanian international player and coach.

The stadium was entirely demolished to build an all-seater new one which was opened in September 2011.

== National games ==
On 6 June 1998, Romania beat Moldova with 5-1(2-0) before leaving for 1998 FIFA World Cup. The assistance was around 8,000 people.

== Gallery ==
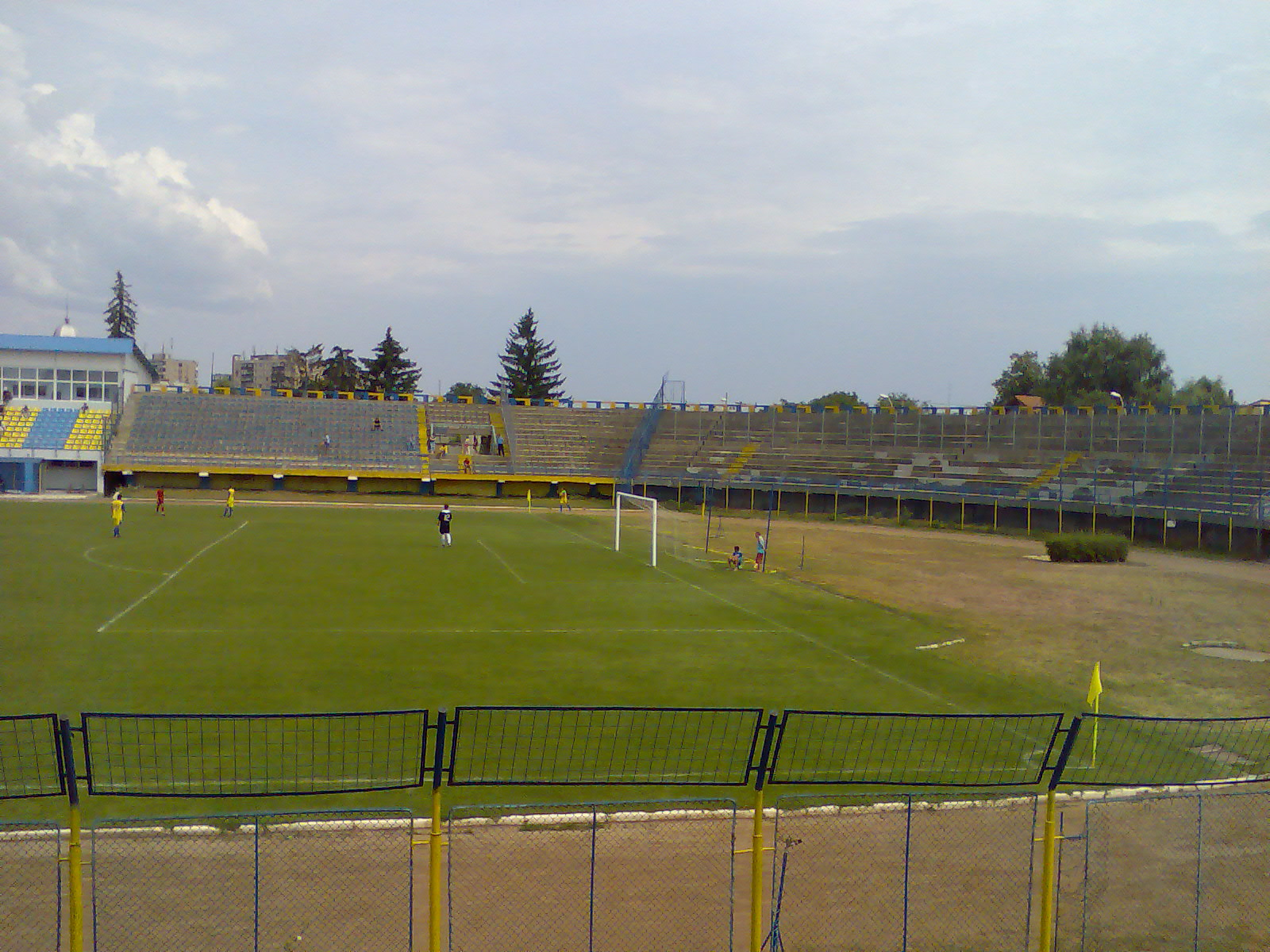
View of the North-East sector

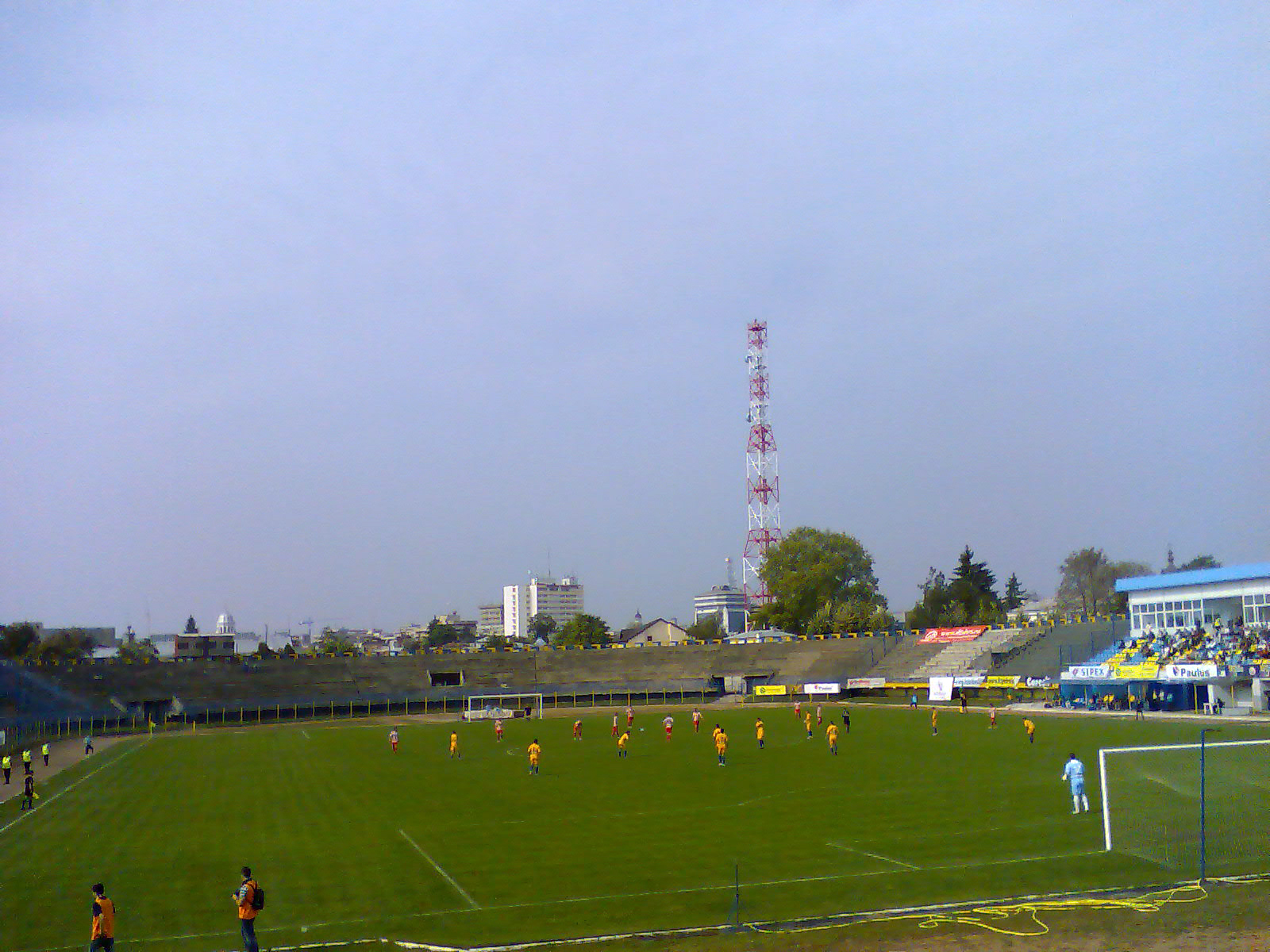
View of the West sector

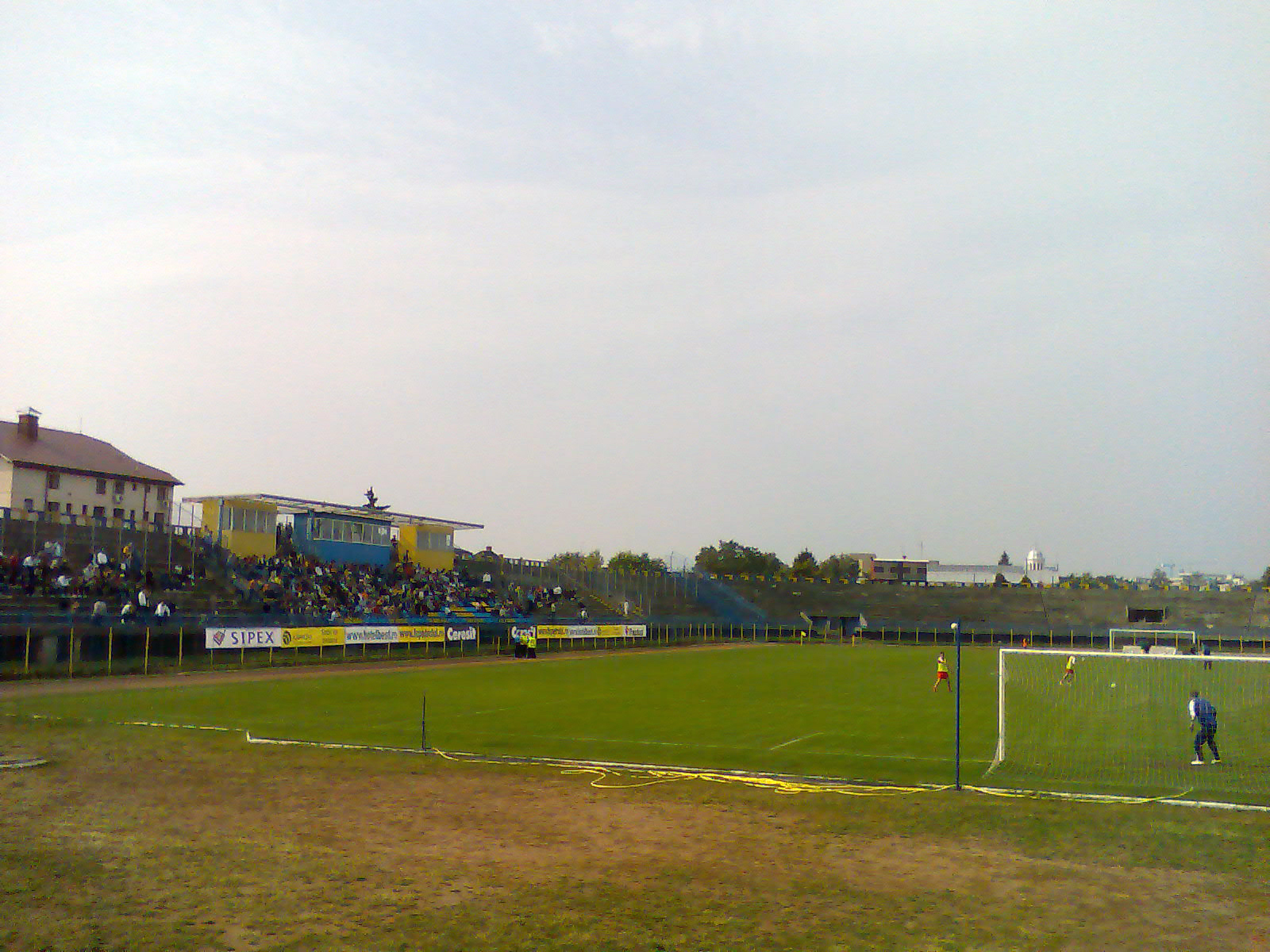
View of the South and 2nd Stand
