= Stadionul Ion Moina (1960) =

Multi-use stadium in Cluj-Napoca, Romania

Ion Moina Stadium
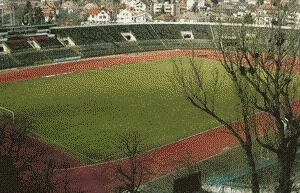
- Interactive map of Ion Moina Stadium
- Former names: Stadionul Oraşului
- Location: Cluj-Napoca, Romania
- Coordinates: 46°46′06.32″N 23°34′19.48″E
- Owner: Cluj-Napoca
- Capacity: 28,000
- Surface: Grass & track

Construction
- Opened: 1961
- Closed: 2008
- Demolished: 2009–2010

Tenant
- Universitatea Cluj (1919–2008)

Ion Moina Stadium was a multi-use stadium in Cluj-Napoca, Romania. It was built on the grounds of the former stadium Stadionul Orășenesc Cluj, which demolition started in 1960.

In 1961, new stands were built and the capacity of the stadium became 28,000 on wooden benches, while the old stands were moved to Câmpia Turzii. The 1961 stands have a U-shaped appearance, as the name of the team that uses it ("U" Cluj). The stadium is named after Ion Moina, the fastest sprinter in Europe in 1948. American R&B star Beyoncé performed for the first time in the country in this stadium on October 22, 2007, during The Beyoncé Experience tour.

On November 20, 2008, the demolition process began, and was planned to be finished in spring 2009. On November 22, 2008, the last official football match played in this stadium, Mureşul Deva, finished 0–0.

The construction of the new stadium, Cluj Arena, began in summer 2009 and finished in 2011. It was inaugurated on 11 October 2011 with a friendly match of Universitatea Cluj against Kuban Krasnodar. The new stadium construction was completed in 2012.

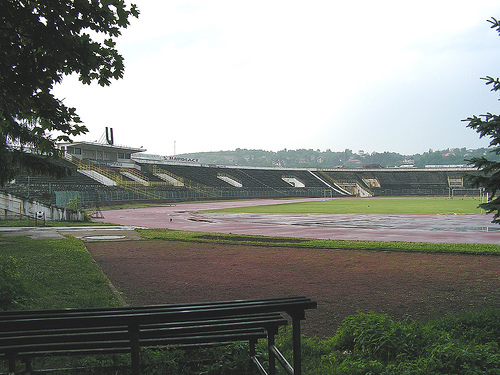
The interior of the old stadium (2008)

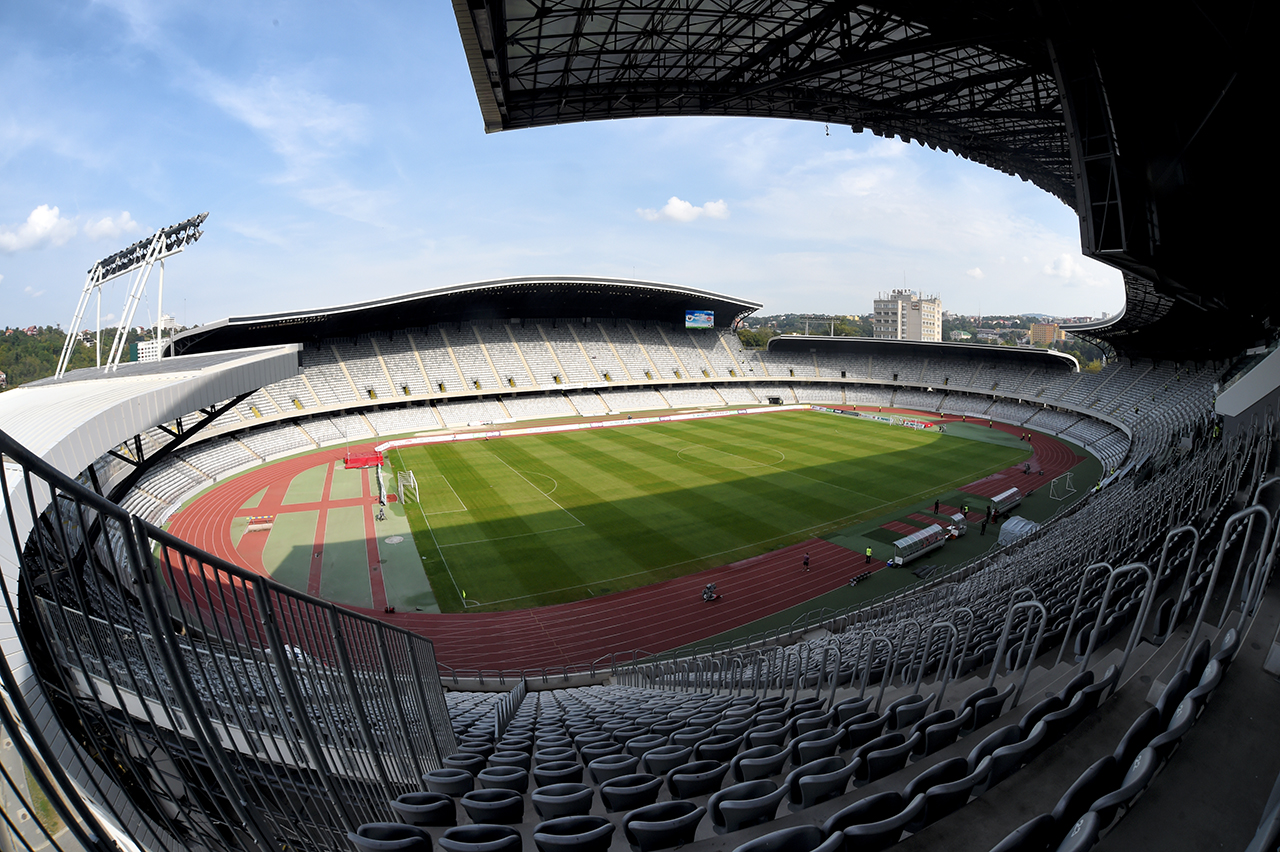
The new stadium, "Cluj Arena"

== See also ==
- Stadionul Orășenesc Cluj
