= Florea Ispir =

Romanian footballer and coach

Personal information
- Date of birth: 25 November 1949 (age 76)
- Place of birth: Vârteju, Romania
- Position: Centre back

Youth career
- 1963–1969: Steaua București

Senior career*
Years	Team	Apps	(Gls)
1969	TUG București	15	(0)
1970–1988	ASA Târgu Mureș (Note: The statistics for the 1986–87 Divizia B season are unavailable.)	512	(2)
Total		527	(2)

International career
- Romania U18
	Romania B	3	(0)

Managerial career
- 1992–1995: ASA Târgu Mureș
- 1995–1996: Gaz Metan Mediaș
- 1997–1998: Apulum Alba Iulia
- 1999–2000: Chimica Târnăveni
- 2000–2001: Gaz Metan Târgu Mureș
- 2001: ASA Târgu Mureș
- * Club domestic league appearances and goals

Florea Ispir (born 25 November 1949 in Vârteju, Ilfov County) is a Romanian former football player and coach. As a player, his total of 485 appearances in Liga I for ASA Târgu Mureș place him first in the competition in terms of matches played for a single team.

== Club career ==
Ispir was born on 25 November 1949 in Vârteju, Romania, growing up as a fan of Rapid București, as he was impressed by players Dan Coe and Ion Motroc, and at one point he went on a trial to play for them but was not offered a contract. He played junior-level football in the early 1960s for Steaua București where he worked with coach Nicolae Tătaru. Ispir started his senior career when Steaua sent him to play in the 1969–70 Divizia C season for TUG București. Afterwards he had an offer to play for ASA Târgu Mureș, which he accepted as he thought that it would be hard for him to earn a starting position in the central defense of Steaua in front of internationals Dumitru Nicolae and Bujor Hălmăgeanu. He made his Divizia A debut for ASA on 29 March 1970 under coach Tiberiu Bone in a 2–1 away loss to Universitatea Craiova. At the end of the season the team was relegated to Divizia B, but Ispir stayed with the club, helping it gain promotion back to the first league after one year. Ispir spent the rest of his career at ASA which consisted of 19 seasons, playing alongside teammates such as László Bölöni, Nicolae Nagy, Árpád Fazekas, Iuliu Hajnal and Petre Varodi, making 485 Divizia A appearances with two goals scored, receiving only one red card in his entire career during a match against Rapid. The highlights of this period were a second place in the 1974–75 Divizia A season, reaching the 1973 Balkans Cup final and playing in all six UEFA Cup matches across the three consecutive editions the team participated in. Around 1975 or 1976 he had offers to play for UTA Arad and CSM Reșița. He refused to go there even if he could have earned more money because he was attached to the town and loved by the fans who called him Shake-Ispir, a nickname inspired from Shakespeare. After the team was relegated once more in 1986, he helped it gain promotion again after one year. Subsequently, he played four more Divizia A matches, the last one being a 2–1 away loss to Dinamo București that took place on 4 October 1987. He had an offer from the team's new coach, Cornel Dinu to play in the final minutes of the games so he can reach 500 Divizia A appearances. However, Ispir declined it, as he was 38 years old and had a hard time recovering after suffering a nasty injury in a match against Victoria București, and also claiming that by playing only in the final minutes of the games he would have made a fool out of himself and tricked football.

== International career ==
Even though he played for Romania under-18 and Romania B, Ispir never played for Romania's senior team. On 13 May 2020, Gazeta Sporturilor included him on a list of best Romanian players who never played for the senior national team.

== Managerial career ==
Ispir started coaching shortly after ending his playing career, being an assistant of Cornel Dinu at ASA Târgu Mureș. From 1992 until 2001 Ispir worked as head coach for ASA Târgu Mureș, Gaz Metan Mediaș, Apulum Alba Iulia, Chimica Târnăveni and Gaz Metan Târgu Mureș. He claimed that he liked coaching but he made the mistake of not adapting to the newer mentality of the players, talking to them in the same way he communicated when he was a player.

== Honours ==
=== Player ===
ASA Târgu Mureș

- Divizia A runner-up: 1974–75
- Divizia B: 1970–71, 1986–87
- Balkans Cup runner-up: 1973
