= Borumlaca =

- Location within Romania

Location
- Country: Romania
- Counties: Bihor County
- Villages: Borumlaca, Vâlcelele, Valea Cerului, Suplacu de Barcău

Physical characteristics
- Mouth: Barcău
  - location: Suplacu de Barcău
  - coordinates: 47.2726°N 22.5522°E
- Length: 14 km (8.7 mi)
- Basin size: 32 km^{2} (12 sq mi)

Basin features
- Progression: Barcău→ Crișul Repede→ Körös→ Tisza→ Danube→ Black Sea
- Tributaries
  - left: Valea Frumoasă

The Borumlaca is a left tributary of the river Barcău in Romania. It discharges into the Barcău in Suplacu de Barcău. Its length is 14 km (8.7 mi) and its basin size is 32 km^{2} (12 sq mi).
