= Valea Frumoasă =

- Location within Romania

Location
- Country: Romania
- Counties: Bihor County
- Villages: Foglaș, Suplacu de Barcău

Physical characteristics
- Mouth: Borumlaca
  - location: Suplacu de Barcău
  - coordinates: 47.2688°N 22.5456°E
- Length: 9 km (5.6 mi)
- Basin size: 9 km^{2} (3.5 sq mi)

Basin features
- Progression: Borumlaca→ Barcău→ Crișul Repede→ Körös→ Tisza→ Danube→ Black Sea

The Valea Frumoasă is a left tributary of the river Borumlaca in Romania. It flows into the Borumlaca near Suplacu de Barcău. Its length is 9 km (5.6 mi) and its basin size is 9 km^{2} (3.5 sq mi).
