= Suplacu de Barcău oil field =

Oil field in Bihor County, Romania

Suplacu de Barcău
- Country: Romania
- Region: Bihor County
- Offshore/onshore: onshore
- Operator: Petrom

Field history
- Discovery: 1956
- Start of development: 1956
- Start of production: 1961

Production
- Current production of oil: 8,500 barrels per day (~4.2×10^{5} t/a)
- Estimated oil in place: 43.7 million tonnes (~ 49×10^{6} m^{3} or 310 million bbl)

The Suplacu de Barcău oil field is an oil field located in Suplacu de Barcău, Bihor County. It was discovered in 1956 and developed by Petrom. It began production in 1961 and produces oil. The total proven reserves of the Suplacu de Barcău oil field are around 310 million barrels (43.7 million tonnes), and production is centered on 8,500 barrels per day (1,350 m^{3}/d). The owning company Petrom will invest €200 million in the redevelopment of the Suplacu de Barcău oil field and a further 70 million barrels (10.24 million tonnes) of oil will be made available thus increasing the total reserves at 310 million barrels (29.26 million tonnes).
