= George Ciorceri =

Romanian footballer and manager

Personal information
- Date of birth: 3 September 1955 (age 71)
- Place of birth: Dumitra, Romania
- Height: 1.75 m (5 ft 9 in)
- Position: Midfielder

Team information
- Current team: CFR Cluj (academy coach)

Youth career
- –1974: Minerul Bălan

Senior career*
Years	Team	Apps	(Gls)
1974–1979	Minerul Bălan		
1979–1981	Viitorul Gheorgheni		
1981–1989	ASA Târgu Mureș	170	(30)

Managerial career
- 1989–1992: ASA Electromureş Târgu Mureş (youth)
- 1992–1995: ASA Târgu Mureș (assistant)
- 1995–2001: ASA Târgu Mureș
- 2001: Politehnica Timișoara
- 2002–2003: CFR Cluj
- 2004: Poli AEK Timișoara
- 2004–2005: Industria Sârmei Câmpia Turzii
- 2006: Unirea Dej
- 2007: Unirea Alba Iulia
- 2008–2009: CFR II Cluj
- 2010–2011: Arieșul Turda
- 2013: FC Brașov (technical director)
- 2015–2016: CFR Cluj (youth)
- 2015: CFR Cluj (caretaker)
- 2016: ASA Târgu Mureș
- 2024–: CFR Cluj (youth)
- 2025–2026: CFR Cluj (assistant)
- * Club domestic league appearances and goals

George Ciorceri (born 3 September 1955) is a former Romanian professional footballer, currently academy coach at Liga I club CFR Cluj.

== Honours ==
=== Player ===
ASA Târgu Mureș

- Divizia B: 1986–87
