= ASA Târgu Mureș =

ASA Târgu Mureș can refer to two Romanian football teams:

- ASA Târgu Mureș (1962), the current club named ASA, founded in 1962, dissolved in 2005 and refounded in 2021. Asociația Sportivă ARMATA Târgu Mureș.
- ASA Târgu Mureș (2013), a club founded in 2008 and dissolved in 2018. Asociația Sportivă ARDEALUL Târgu Mureș.
