= Eugen Vodă =

Romanian footballer

Personal information
- Date of birth: 14 January 1964 (age 62)
- Place of birth: Târgu Mureș, Romania
- Height: 1.89 m (6 ft 2 in)
- Position: Goalkeeper

Youth career
- ASA Târgu Mureș

Senior career*
Years	Team	Apps	(Gls)
1983–1992	ASA Târgu Mureș (Note: The statistics for the 1986–87, 1989–90 and 1990–91 Divizia B seasons are unavailable.)	51	(0)
1988–1989	→ Electromureș Târgu Mureș (loan)		
1992–1998	Universitatea Craiova	57	(0)
1998–1999	ASA Târgu Mureș	1	(0)
2001–2008	Skála	61	(0)
2004–2007	→ Skála II (loan)	4	(0)
Total		174	(0)

International career
1984	Romania U21	2	(0)
- * Club domestic league appearances and goals

Eugen Vodă (born 14 January 1964) is a Romanian former footballer who played as a goalkeeper.

== Honours ==
ASA Târgu Mureș

- Divizia B: 1986–87, 1990–91

Universitatea Craiova

- Cupa României: 1992–93, runner-up 1993–94
