= List of tunnels in Romania =

Most of Romania's tunnels date from the 20th century in the building of the railways, typically excavated through rock by blasting and then hand excavation.

The more modern tunnels include the longer Bucharest metro tunnels and utility tunnels, constructed from approximately 1970 to date, using a variety of tunnelling methods.

== Road tunnels ==
| Name | Image | Location | Length | Type | Builder | Opened |
|---|---|---|---|---|---|---|
| Bâlea Tunnel | | Transfăgărășan | 0.84 km (0.52 mi) | 2 lanes tunnel | | 1972 |
| Săcel Tunnel | | A1 motorway | 0.34 km (0.21 mi) | double highway tunnel | | 2013 |
| KM 60 Tunnel | | Transfăgărășan | 0.172 km (0.107 mi) | single tunnel | | 1972 |
| Lacul Roșu Tunnel | | Harghita County | 0.155 km (0.096 mi) | 2 lanes tunnel | | 2004 |
| Momaia Tunnel | | Argeș County | 1.35 km (0.84 mi) | double highway tunnel | | in construction |
| Holdea Tunnel | | Timiș County | 2.13 km (1.32 mi) | double highway tunnel | | in construction |
| Meseș Tunnel | | A3 motorway | 2.89 km (1.80 mi) | double highway tunnel | | planned |

== Rail tunnels ==
| Name | Image | Location | Length | Type | Builder | Opened |
|---|---|---|---|---|---|---|
| Tunelul Mare (Predeal) | | Brașov County | 0.937 km (0.582 mi) | Single-bore | | 1878 |
| Tunelul Mic (Predeal) | | Brașov County | 0.1 km (0.062 mi) | Single-bore | | 1878 |
| Filești Tunnel | | Galați County | 0.77 km (0.48 mi) | | | 1898 |
| Tălăşmani Tunnel | | Galați County | 3.33 km (2.07 mi) | | | 1911 |
| Teliu Tunnel | | Brașov County | 4.369 km (2.715 mi) | Single-bore | Julius Berger | 1929 |
| Daneş Tunnel | | Mureș County | 0.969 km (0.602 mi) | double track | | 2017 |
| Sighișoara Tunnel | | Sighișoara | 0.401 km (0.249 mi) | double track | | 2017 |
| Ormeniș Tunnel | | Brașov County | 6.9 km (4.3 mi) | double-bore | | in construction |
| Balota Tunnel | | Mehedinți County | 6.189 km (3.846 mi) | double-bore | | planned |

== Other tunnels ==
| Name | Image | Location | Length | Type | Builder | Opened |
|---|---|---|---|---|---|---|
| Lotru-Ciunget Tunnel | | Ciungetu | 13.719 km (8.525 mi) | Single-bore | Hidroconstrucția | 1972 |
| Poiana Brașov water Tunnel | | Poiana Brașov | 0.9 km (0.56 mi) | Single-bore | | 2018 |

== See also ==
- List of tunnels by location
