= 1969–70 Divizia C =

Third tier Romanian football league

Divizia C
- Season: 1969–70
- Country: Romania
- Teams: 128

The 1969–70 Divizia C was the 14th season of Liga III, the third tier of the Romanian football league system.

The format was maintained with eight series, each consisting of 16 teams. At the end of the season, the winners of each series qualified for the promotion play-off to Divizia B, from which four teams were promoted, while the bottom two teams from each series were relegated to the County Championship.

== Teams ==
=== Team changes ===
To Divizia C

Relegated from Divizia B

- CFR Pașcani
- Medicina Cluj
- Electronica Obor București
- IS Câmpia Turzii

Promoted from County Championship

- Minerul Comănești
- Constructorul Piatra Neamț
- Dunărea Brăila
- Locomotiva Adjud
- Laromet București
- ICAB Arcuda
- Metalul Colibași
- Petrolul Târgoviște
- CFR Caransebeș
- Electromotor Timișoara
- Unirea Orșova
- Independența Sibiu
- Minerul Teliuc
- Viitorul Gheorgheni
- Foresta Năsăud
- Chimistul Baia Mare

From Divizia C

Promoted to Divizia B

- Metalul Târgoviște
- Olimpia Satu Mare
- Știința Bacău
- Minerul Anina

Relegated to County Championship

- Cimentul Bicaz
- Unirea Negrești
- Chimia Mărășești
- Gloria Tecuci
- Ideal Cernavodă
- Aurora Urziceni
- Minerul Câmpulung
- CIL Râmnicu Vâlcea
- Autorapid Craiova
- Șoimii Timișoara
- Progresul Sibiu
- Mureșul Luduș
- Minerul Baia Sprie
- Voința Târnăveni
- CFR Sighișoara

=== Other changes ===
- Metalul Brăila was renamed Metalurgistul Brăila.
- Flamura Roșie Tecuci was renamed Muncitorul Tecuci.
- TUG București was renamed Sportul Muncitoresc București.
- Metalul Colibași was renamed Dacia Pitești.
- Muscelul Câmpulung was renamed Unirea Câmpulung.
- Voința Lugoj was renamed Vulturii Textila Lugoj.
- Energia Turnu Severin was renamed Energetica Turnu Severin.
- Aurul Zlatna was renamed Minaur Zlatna.
- Dinamo Oradea was moved from Oradea to Zalău and renamed Dinamo Zalău.
- Medicina Cluj withdrew from Divizia C before the start of the season and Dermata Cluj was promoted in their place.
- Unirea Oradea withdrew from Divizia C before the start of the season and Bradul Vișeu was spared from relegation.

== League tables ==
=== Seria I ===
Pos	Team	Pld	W	D	L	GF	GA	GD	Pts	Promotion or relegation
1	CFR Pașcani (C)	28	18	4	6	65	25	+40	40	Qualification to promotion play-off
2	Nicolina Iași	28	16	6	6	69	29	+40	38	
3	Textila Botoșani	28	15	4	9	45	31	+14	34	
4	Victoria Roman	28	14	5	9	60	31	+29	33	
5	Foresta Fălticeni	28	13	4	11	42	36	+6	30	
6	Minobrad Vatra Dornei	28	12	6	10	29	36	−7	30	
7	Petrolul Moinești	28	10	9	9	45	34	+11	29	
8	Minerul Comănești	28	11	5	12	36	44	−8	27	
9	Fulgerul Dorohoi	28	12	1	15	45	74	−29	25	
10	Letea Bacău	28	11	2	15	41	40	+1	24	
11	Textila Buhuși	28	11	2	15	46	46	0	24	
12	Minerul Gura Humorului	28	10	3	15	41	47	−6	23	
13	Rarăul Câmpulung Moldovenesc	28	9	5	14	36	58	−22	23	
14	Penicilina Iași	28	8	6	14	24	52	−28	22	
15	Constructorul Piatra Neamț (R)	28	6	6	16	25	66	−41	18	Relegation to County Championship
16	Foresta Ciurea (R)	0	0	0	0	0	0	0	0 (Note: Foresta Ciurea withdrew from championship after 3 rounds.)	Expelled

Source: romaniansoccer.ro
(C) Champions; (R) Relegated

=== Seria II ===
Pos	Team	Pld	W	D	L	GF	GA	GD	Pts	Promotion or relegation
1	Metalul Plopeni (C)	30	17	11	2	64	13	+51	45	Qualification to promotion play-off
2	Electronica Obor București	30	18	4	8	70	26	+44	40	
3	Șoimii Buzău	30	15	9	6	50	26	+24	39	
4	Ancora Galați	30	14	6	10	43	32	+11	34	
5	Metalul Buzău	30	14	5	11	43	41	+2	33	
6	Muncitorul Tecuci	30	12	8	10	42	37	+5	32	
7	Petrolistul Boldești	30	12	7	11	41	33	+8	31	
8	Metalurgistul Brăila	30	11	9	10	30	32	−2	31	
9	Rulmentul Bârlad	30	14	3	13	39	46	−7	31	
10	SUT Galați	30	11	8	11	32	33	−1	30	
11	Chimia Gheorghiu-Dej	30	13	4	13	41	47	−6	30	
12	Gloria CFR Galați	30	10	8	12	34	43	−9	28	
13	Unirea Focșani	30	6	10	14	31	48	−17	22	
14	Petrolul Berca	30	9	4	17	30	54	−24	22	
15	Dunărea Brăila (R)	30	6	6	18	35	60	−25	18	Relegation to County Championship
16	Locomotiva Adjud (R)	30	5	4	21	20	74	−54	14	Relegation to County Championship

Source: romaniansoccer.ro
(C) Champions; (R) Relegated

=== Seria III ===
Pos	Team	Pld	W	D	L	GF	GA	GD	Pts	Promotion or relegation
1	SN Oltenița (C)	30	15	11	4	51	21	+30	41	Qualification to promotion play-off
2	IMU Medgidia	30	14	9	7	39	18	+21	37	
3	Delta Tulcea	30	14	7	9	42	30	+12	35	
4	Cimentul Medgidia	30	13	9	8	27	26	+1	35	
5	Celuloza Călărași	30	13	8	9	44	28	+16	34	
6	Electrica Constanța	30	14	5	11	41	33	+8	33	
7	Laromet București	30	12	8	10	39	34	+5	32	
8	Tehnometal București	30	12	7	11	47	34	+13	31	
9	Olimpia Giurgiu	30	11	7	12	28	35	−7	29	
10	Unirea Mânăstirea	30	12	4	14	39	45	−6	28	
11	Petrolul Videle	30	11	6	13	35	47	−12	28	
12	Mașini Unelte București	30	10	7	13	42	37	+5	27	
13	Marina Mangalia	30	9	9	12	36	41	−5	27	
14	Voința București	30	8	11	11	37	44	−7	27	
15	ITC Constanța (R)	30	7	13	10	22	30	−8	27	Relegation to County Championship
16	ICAB Arcuda (R)	30	3	3	24	24	90	−66	9	Relegation to County Championship

Source: romaniansoccer.ro
(C) Champions; (R) Relegated

=== Seria IV ===
Pos	Team	Pld	W	D	L	GF	GA	GD	Pts	Promotion or relegation
1	Autobuzul București (C)	30	18	9	3	57	22	+35	45	Qualification to promotion play-off
2	Comerțul Alexandria	30	17	7	6	48	32	+16	41	
3	Sportul Muncitoresc București	30	17	6	7	58	32	+26	40	
4	IRA Câmpina	30	15	10	5	43	27	+16	40	
5	Carpați Sinaia	30	15	8	7	51	30	+21	38	
6	Chimia Turnu Măgurele	30	12	7	11	44	35	+9	31	
7	Caraimanul Bușteni	30	10	10	10	40	43	−3	30	
8	Flacăra Roșie București	30	9	11	10	32	28	+4	29	
9	Prahova Ploiești	30	9	9	12	44	35	+9	27	
10	Petrolul Târgoviște	30	9	9	12	30	42	−12	27	
11	Progresul Corabia	30	9	8	13	34	55	−21	26	
12	Sirena București	30	8	9	13	31	35	−4	25	
13	Unirea Drăgășani	30	10	4	16	33	50	−17	24	
14	Dacia Pitești	30	7	9	14	32	48	−16	23	
15	Unirea Câmpulung (R)	30	7	7	16	30	51	−21	21	Relegation to County Championship
16	Progresul Balș (R)	30	3	7	20	21	63	−42	13	Relegation to County Championship

Source: romaniansoccer.ro
(C) Champions; (R) Relegated

=== Seria V ===
Pos	Team	Pld	W	D	L	GF	GA	GD	Pts	Promotion or relegation
1	UM Timișoara (C)	30	20	4	6	67	18	+49	44	Qualification to promotion play-off
2	Vulturii Textila Lugoj	30	17	6	7	87	33	+54	40	
3	Minerul Lupeni	30	14	5	11	59	36	+23	33	
4	Minerul Bocșa Montană	30	13	7	10	42	38	+4	33	
5	Energetica Turnu Severin	30	13	6	11	38	50	−12	32	
6	Steagul Roșu Plenița	30	13	5	12	54	39	+15	31	
7	CFR Caransebeș	30	12	6	12	50	44	+6	30	
8	Victoria Târgu Jiu	30	13	4	13	43	41	+2	30	
9	Victoria Caransebeș	30	11	8	11	34	35	−1	30	
10	Metalul Topleț	30	13	3	14	49	70	−21	29	
11	Electromotor Timișoara	30	11	6	13	39	53	−14	28	
12	Minerul Motru	30	12	3	15	31	34	−3	27	
13	Dunărea Calafat	30	10	6	14	41	43	−2	26	
14	Furnirul Deta	30	11	4	15	40	52	−12	26	
15	Progresul Strehaia (R)	30	10	6	14	34	54	−20	26	Relegation to County Championship
16	Unirea Orșova (R)	30	6	3	21	31	99	−68	15	Relegation to County Championship

Source: romaniansoccer.ro
(C) Champions; (R) Relegated

=== Seria VI ===
Pos	Team	Pld	W	D	L	GF	GA	GD	Pts	Promotion or relegation
1	Minaur Zlatna (C)	30	19	5	6	48	21	+27	43	Qualification to promotion play-off
2	Metalul Aiud	30	15	6	9	50	26	+24	36	
3	Victoria Călan	30	14	5	11	38	31	+7	33	
4	IS Câmpia Turzii	30	13	5	12	37	27	+10	31	
5	Mureșul Deva	30	11	9	10	40	35	+5	31	
6	Minerul Ghelar	30	12	7	11	38	35	+3	31	
7	Independența Sibiu	30	13	5	12	31	32	−1	31	
8	Arieșul Câmpia Turzii	30	12	6	12	34	31	+3	30	
9	Arieșul Turda	30	12	6	12	32	34	−2	30	
10	Minerul Teliuc	30	13	4	13	35	40	−5	30	
11	Soda Ocna Mureș	30	12	6	12	32	37	−5	30	
12	Aurul Brad	30	14	1	15	38	35	+3	29	
13	ASA Sibiu	30	10	8	12	26	34	−8	28	
14	Știința Petroșani	30	9	9	12	29	29	0	27	
15	Tehnofrig Cluj (R)	30	8	6	16	23	39	−16	22	Relegation to County Championship
16	Minerul Baia de Arieș (R)	30	7	4	19	24	69	−45	18	Relegation to County Championship

Source: romaniansoccer.ro
(C) Champions; (R) Relegated

=== Seria VII ===
Pos	Team	Pld	W	D	L	GF	GA	GD	Pts	Promotion or relegation
1	Gloria Bistrița (C)	30	20	5	5	82	24	+58	45	Qualification to promotion play-off
2	Victoria Carei	30	17	7	6	55	24	+31	41	
3	CIL Gherla	30	16	7	7	50	35	+15	39	
4	CIL Sighetu Marmației	30	16	6	8	49	31	+18	38	
5	Dermata Cluj	30	14	7	9	47	23	+24	35	
6	Someșul Satu Mare	30	13	5	12	41	31	+10	31	
7	Unirea Dej	30	12	7	11	52	44	+8	31	
8	Chimistul Baia Mare	30	12	7	11	45	41	+4	31	
9	Bradul Vișeu	30	14	2	14	35	48	−13	30	
10	Constructorul Baia Mare	30	12	4	14	41	47	−6	28	
11	Metalul Salonta	30	9	6	15	25	54	−29	24	
12	Foresta Năsăud	30	9	5	16	39	53	−14	23	
13	Topitorul Baia Mare	30	10	3	17	39	56	−17	23	
14	Dinamo Zalău	30	7	8	15	28	52	−24	22	
15	Bihoreana Marghita (R)	30	8	5	17	25	49	−24	21	Relegation to County Championship
16	Dacia Oradea (R)	30	6	6	18	23	64	−41	18	Relegation to County Championship

Source: romaniansoccer.ro
(C) Champions; (R) Relegated

=== Seria VIII ===
Pos	Team	Pld	W	D	L	GF	GA	GD	Pts	Promotion or relegation
1	Tractorul Brașov (C)	30	23	4	3	86	16	+70	50	Qualification to promotion play-off
2	Chimia Făgăraș	30	20	2	8	65	28	+37	42	
3	Oltul Sfântu Gheorghe	30	18	5	7	69	24	+45	41	
4	Minerul Bălan	30	14	5	11	36	41	−5	33	
5	Lemnarul Odorheiu Secuiesc	30	15	2	13	66	41	+25	32	
6	Metalul Copșa Mică	30	14	4	12	59	47	+12	32	
7	Colorom Codlea	30	13	5	12	47	51	−4	31	
8	Chimica Târnăveni	30	14	2	14	48	38	+10	30	
9	Torpedo Zărnești	30	12	4	14	40	39	+1	28	
10	Unirea Cristuru Secuiesc	30	12	4	14	40	53	−13	28	
11	Carpați Brașov	30	10	7	13	32	38	−6	27	
12	Vitrometan Mediaș	30	11	4	15	41	62	−21	26	
13	Chimia Victoria	30	10	4	16	38	57	−19	24	
14	Viitorul Gheorgheni	30	8	6	16	23	67	−44	22	
15	Medicina Târgu Mureș (R)	30	6	5	19	23	61	−38	17	Relegation to County Championship
16	Avântul Reghin (R)	30	6	5	19	31	81	−50	17	Relegation to County Championship

Source: romaniansoccer.ro
(C) Champions; (R) Relegated

== Promotion play-off ==
=== Group I (Brașov) ===
Pos	Team	Pld	W	D	L	GF	GA	GD	Pts	Promotion or relegation
1	SN Oltenița (P)	3	2	1	0	5	1	+4	5	Promotion to Divizia B
2	CFR Pașcani (P)	3	2	1	0	8	5	+3	5	Promotion to Divizia B
3	Metalul Plopeni	3	0	1	2	4	6	−2	1	
4	Autobuzul București	3	0	1	2	2	7	−5	1	

Source: romaniansoccer.ro
(P) Promoted

4 July 1970	Metalul Plopeni	1–1	Autobuzul București	Brașov
16:00 EEST (UTC+3)				Stadium: Metrom

4 July 1970	SN Oltenița	1–1	CFR Pașcani	Brașov
18:00 EEST (UTC+3)				Stadium: Metrom

8 July 1970	SN Oltenița	1–0	Metalul Plopeni	Brașov
17:30 EEST (UTC+3)				Stadium: Tineretului

8 July 1970	CFR Pașcani	3–1	Autobuzul București	Brașov
17:30 EEST (UTC+3)				Stadium: Metrom

11 July 1970	SN Oltenița	3–0	Autobuzul București	Brașov
17:30 EEST (UTC+3)	Constantin 10'; Cîmpeanu 42'; Stamanichi 66'	Report		Stadium: Tractorul

11 July 1970	CFR Pașcani	4–3	Metalul Plopeni	Brașov
17:30 EEST (UTC+3)	Ciupa 13'; Blejușcă 30'; Blejușcă 52'; Blejușcă 87'	Report	Negoiță 13'; Negoiță 52'; Petre 87'	Stadium: Metrom

=== Group II (Arad) ===
Pos	Team	Pld	W	D	L	GF	GA	GD	Pts	Promotion or relegation
1	UM Timișoara (P)	3	1	2	0	5	4	+1	4	Promotion to Divizia B
2	Gloria Bistrița (P)	3	1	1	1	5	5	0	3	Promotion to Divizia B
3	Minaur Zlatna	3	0	3	0	1	1	0	3	
4	Tractorul Brașov	3	0	2	1	3	4	−1	2	

Source: romaniansoccer.ro
(P) Promoted

4 July 1970	Minaur Zlatna	1–1	Gloria Bistrița	Arad
18:00 EEST (UTC+3)	Burlacu 79'	Report	I. Ciocan 60'	Stadium: Gloria

4 July 1970	UM Timișoara	2–2	Tractorul Brașov	Arad
18:00 EEST (UTC+3)	Iancu 22'; Popescu 83'	Report	Budai 5'; Petruț 86'	Stadium: CFR

8 July 1970	UM Timișoara	0–0	Minaur Zlatna	Arad
18:00 EEST (UTC+3)				Stadium: Gloria

8 July 1970	Tractorul Brașov	1–2	Gloria Bistrița	Arad
18:00 EEST (UTC+3)				Stadium: CFR

11 July 1970	UM Timișoara	3–2	Gloria Bistrița	Arad
				Stadium: Gloria

11 July 1970	Tractorul Brașov	0–0	Minaur Zlatna	Arad
				Stadium: CFR

== See also ==
- 1969–70 Divizia A
- 1969–70 Divizia B
- 1969–70 County Championship
- 1969–70 Cupa României
