= László Bölöni =

Romanian footballer and manager (born 1953)

Ladislau Bölöni
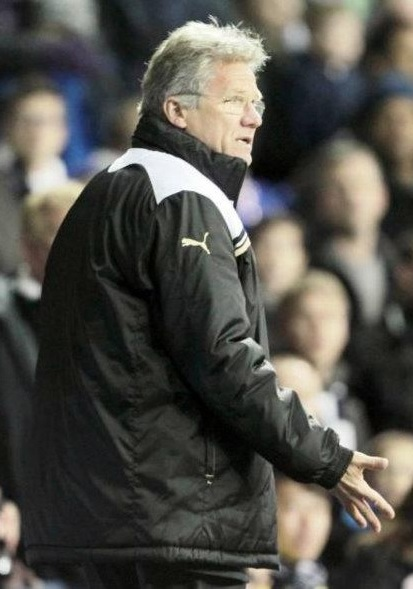
- Bölöni with PAOK in 2011

Personal information
- Full name: Ladislau Iosif Bölöni
- Date of birth: 11 March 1953 (age 73)
- Place of birth: Târgu Mureș, Romania
- Height: 1.76 m (5 ft 9 in)
- Position: Midfielder

Youth career
- –1968: Chimica Târnăveni

Senior career*
Years	Team	Apps	(Gls)
1968–1970	Chimica Târnăveni	38	(0)
1970–1984	ASA Târgu Mureș	406	(64)
1984–1987	Steaua București	97	(24)
1988	Racing Jet Wavre	32	(3)
1989	Créteil	11	(2)
1989–1992	Orléans	77	(4)
Total		661	(97)

International career
1972–1975	Romania U21	4	(0)
1975–1976	Romania Olympic	12	(2)
1975–1988	Romania	102	(23)

Managerial career
- 1994–2000: Nancy
- 2000–2001: Romania
- 2001–2003: Sporting CP
- 2003–2006: Rennes
- 2006: Monaco
- 2007–2008: Al Jazira
- 2008–2010: Standard Liège
- 2010: Al Wahda
- 2011: Lens
- 2011–2012: PAOK
- 2012–2015: Al Khor
- 2015: Al Ittihad
- 2017–2020: Antwerp
- 2020: Gent
- 2020–2021: Panathinaikos
- 2022–2024: Metz
Medal record
Representing Romania
Universiade
Gold medal – first place	1974 Nice	Team
- * Club domestic league appearances and goals

Ladislau "Loți" Iosif Bölöni (Hungarian: László "Laci" József Bölöni; born 11 March 1953) is a Romanian professional football manager and former player.

After starting out at ASA Târgu Mureș, Bölöni became an integral part of the Steaua București team that won the European Cup in 1986, making it the only Romanian team—and one of two Eastern European sides—to have achieved the honour. He was twice named Romanian Footballer of the Year and took part in 484 Divizia A games, the fourth-most appearances in the history of the competition. Internationally, Bölöni earned 102 caps with the national team, which ranks him fifth in the nation's all-time list, and scored 23 goals, the sixth highest all-time mark. He is thus considered one of the best Romanian footballers in history.

Following his retirement as a player, he went on to coach clubs in France, Portugal, the Arabian Peninsula, Belgium and Greece. Bölöni was also at the helm of the Romania national team between 2000 and 2001. In terms of trophies won, his most successful stints were at Sporting CP and Standard Liège, with three domestic honours each.

== Club career ==
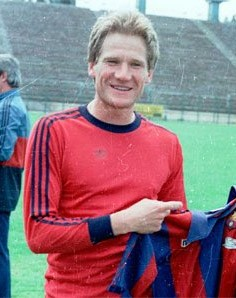
Bölöni at the Stadionul Steaua in 1986, the year he won the European Cup

His first team was Chimica Târnăveni, and in 1970 he moved to ASA Târgu Mureș. He stayed there until 1984, when he joined Steaua București, where he was part of the team which won the 1986 European Cup Final (where he missed his penalty in the shootout) and the European Super Cup the following year.

Bölöni remained at Steaua until 1987. In 1988, aged 35, Bölöni left the country to play in Belgium at Racing Jet Wavre, and then in France at Créteil. He retired from professional football in 1992. On 25 March 2008, he was decorated by Romanian president Traian Băsescu with Ordinul "Meritul Sportiv" — (The Order "The Sportive Merit") class II, for his part in winning the European Cup in 1986.

== International career ==
Bölöni won the Universiade gold medal with Romania's students football team in the 1974 edition that was held in France, playing alongside Gheorghe Mulțescu, Dan Păltinișanu, Romulus Chihaia and Paul Cazan.

Playing for the Romania national team in 1983, Bölöni scored one of his most notable goals, in the 1–0 win against Italy in a Euro 84 qualification match, which eventually proved invaluable to the country's qualification for the tournament. At the finals themselves in France, he played in all three of Romania's games, and scored the equaliser in the 1–1 draw with Spain at the Stade Geoffroy-Guichard. In total, Bölöni won 102 caps for Romania and scored 23 goals—or 108 caps and 25 goals if the Olympic games qualification is included.

== Managerial career ==
As a football coach, Bölöni started with French club Nancy, where he was head coach for several years. He promoted with the team in Division 1. In 2000, he was appointed as national team coach, but in the summer of 2001 decided to leave the job.

Then he joined Portugal's club Sporting CP, where he won both the Primeira Liga and Taça de Portugal in his first year. He was fired at the end of the next season due to mediocre results. His legacy at Sporting was the introduction of youth team players such as Ricardo Quaresma, Hugo Viana and Cristiano Ronaldo into the senior's team starting lineup. In 2002, he aimed to solve the club's financial problems by bringing in Lyon forward Tony Vairelles on loan in exchange for Lyon having first option to sign Ronaldo and Quaresma, but the French club had no interest in the players.

In 2003, he returned to France as manager of Rennes. In 2005, he managed the team to their best position in history (4th in Ligue 1), and a subsequent UEFA Cup qualification.

In May 2006, Bölöni signed a two-year contract with Monaco, but was fired on 23 October for lack of results. Monaco were 19th out of 20 in the league.

On 9 June 2008, Belgian team Standard Liège appointed Bölöni as their new manager, as he succeeded Michel Preud'homme, who led the club to their first Belgian First Division title in 25 years (season 2007–2008). On 24 May 2009, he won the Belgian First Division title in his first season at Standard (season 2008–2009) after playing the championship play-off against Anderlecht. On 10 February 2010, Bölöni resigned from his coaching position at Standard Liege.

On 29 May 2010, it was officially announced that Bölöni signed a contract with Emirati club Al Wahda. On 2 September 2010, Al Wahda sacked Bölöni, despite the team's 3–1 win over Ittihad Kalba.

On 2 January 2011, he was hired by Lens, on a one-year contract, but he couldn't save the team from relegation. Bölöni was immediately released in June, and signed a two-year contract with PAOK on 8 June 2011, following a short negotiation period.

=== PAOK ===
Bölöni's tenure at PAOK started with two wins against Vålerenga for the Third Qualifying Round of 2011–12 UEFA Europa League, that brought them against Karpaty Lviv for the Play-off round. PAOK won the first leg at home and drew the second leg, qualifying for the group stage. In a tough group that consisted of Tottenham Hotspur, Rubin Kazan and Shamrock Rovers, Bölöni's PAOK managed to qualify undefeated at the first place, winning the game at White Hart Lane on the process, a remarkable feat considering that no Greek team had won at English soil since 1999, when PAOK defeated Arsenal at Highbury. For the round of 32, PAOK faced Udinese, and although a 0–0 draw at the first game in Italy spread optimism, a weakened PAOK side was eliminated off the competition when the home leg ended with a 0–3 defeat. All and all, the European presence was positive despite the abrupt end, as PAOK managed six wins out of twelve games, with impressive performances and a milestone win against Tottenham.

At the home front, PAOK had a turbulent season, as the team managed to finish third in regular season, with 5th being its final position after Play-off. During the season, PAOK won the away games against AEK Athens and Panathinaikos, marking the end of a winless, ten-year-old tradition against those teams when playing away from home. The team's form was inconsistent though, and the departure – due to the club's financial difficulties – of two of the most significant players of the team, Vieirinha and Pablo Contreras, didn't help matters. Bölöni had to improvise to cover for the roster's lack of depth, with mixed results. Although the season was not deemed successful, fans didn't put the blame on Bölöni, who had won their hearts with his personality, his results against some major opponents and the team's style of play when on good form.

On 25 May 2012, PAOK released Bölöni, after a one-year cooperation.

=== Coaching in the Middle East ===
Bölöni was hired by Qatari club Al Khor on 21 June 2012. On 26 January 2013, in a league match against Qatar SC, he was involved in a controversial incident. He threw a water bottle at a ball boy behind the goal after the boy took the ball, which went out of play, off the pitch. The bottle did not hit the boy, however, it was spotted by the match observer, Ali Al-Naimi, who relayed the information to a referee's assistant who eventually informed the referee, Fahad Jaber, who decided to send him off. Instead of going directly to the stands, he chose to illegally stay within the checkpoint. Security officers attempted to guide him off, but he retorted by using foul language and pushing the police officers. As a result, a police report was filed against him. He was later fined 75,000 Qatari riyals by the QFA and banned for 5 matches.

In August 2013, Croatian media speculated that Bölöni might be named the new head coach of Dinamo Zagreb, following the sacking of team's former head coach, Krunoslav Jurčić. Bölöni had previously been linked with Hajduk Split, Dinamo Zagreb's fierce rival, as well.

On 21 July 2015, Saudi club Al Ittihad announced Bölöni as their new coach.

=== Royal Antwerp ===
On 16 June 2017, Bölöni was announced as the new manager of Belgian club Royal Antwerp. In his first season at the club, he finished eighth place in the regular season, and third place in the Europa League play-off group, to keep the team safe from relegation.

In his second season, Antwerp was the surprise package of the championship, finishing the regular season on sixth place, and qualifying for the championship play-offs for the first time. Antwerp recorded important victories over Genk (1–0), Anderlecht (2–1), Gent (2–1), Standard Liège (2–1), as well as a blank draw with Club Brugge in the first half of the play-off, and climbed on the 3rd place, but later losses to these teams meant Antwerp finished fourth, thus going for the Europa League play-offs final. In the final, Antwerp beat Charleroi 3–2 after coming back from 0–2 down in the first minutes. Thus, Antwerp secured qualification in the third qualifying round of UEFA Europa League after 26 years of absence from Europe.

After surprisingly knocking out Viktoria Plzeň on away goals in the third round, Antwerp stopped short of the group stages, as they were subsequently knocked out by AZ in the play-offs. Internally, Bölöni led the team to another fourth-place finish in the league, as well as the Belgian cup final in the 2019–20 season, their first since 1992. However, the competition was postponed until 1 August, due to the COVID-19 pandemic, and Bölöni's contract subsequently expired on 20 May, leading his successor Ivan Leko to manage the team for the final.

=== Gent ===
On 20 August 2020, Belgian League runners-up Gent announced Bölöni as their new head coach. In September, he was sacked after only three games in charge.

=== Panathinaikos ===
On 19 October 2020, Bölöni was announced as the new head coach for Greek club Panathinaikos. He drew his first game 1–1 against Volos in the Super League. On 10 May 2021 Boloni was, for the second time this season, sacked, this time by the Greens after failing to guide them to a European qualification spot; he was replaced by Ivan Jovanović on 24 May.

Throughout January 2022, Bölöni was in talks with Romanian Football Federation president Răzvan Burleanu to return as manager of the Romania national team, more than twenty years after leaving the job. The failed negotiations led to the appointing of Edward Iordănescu instead.

== Personal life ==
Bölöni was born in Târgu Mureș, Romania, into an ethnic Hungarian family from Târnăveni.

When Bölöni was 15, his father died of a stroke while watching him play from the stands. His father's death strongly affected him, but Bölöni was persuaded by his mother to continue playing football. She moved from their native city Târnăveni to Budapest sometime later in her life. During his time at Steaua București, Bölöni also worked as a dentist for six years; his daughter followed in his footsteps, and studied implantology in France.

In 2021, he was hired by the Nemzeti Sport daily to analyze Hungary's matches at the UEFA Euro 2020, and in the same year revealed his support of the Székely Land football team. Nevertheless, after failed negotiations to take charge of the Romania national team in 2022, Bölöni expressed his regret for not being able to represent his country again.

Bölöni holds Romanian, Hungarian and French nationalities. He acquired French nationality by naturalization on 7 July 1998.

== Career statistics ==
=== Club ===
Appearances and goals by club, season and competition
Club	Season	League			Continental		Other		Total	
Club	Season	Division	Apps	Goals	Apps	Goals	Apps	Goals	Apps	Goals
ASA Târgu Mureș	1970–71	Divizia B	19	2	0	0	0	0	19	2
ASA Târgu Mureș	1971–72	Divizia A	27	1	0	0	0	0	27	1
ASA Târgu Mureș	1972–73	Divizia A	26	0	0	0	0	0	26	0
ASA Târgu Mureș	1973–74	Divizia A	31	3	0	0	0	0	31	3
ASA Târgu Mureș	1974–75	Divizia A	24	1	0	0	0	0	24	1
ASA Târgu Mureș	1975–76	Divizia A	33	4	2 (Note: Two appearances in 1975–76 UEFA Cup)	0	0	0	35	4
ASA Târgu Mureș	1976–77	Divizia A	33	11	2 (Note: Two appearances in 1976–77 UEFA Cup)	0	0	0	35	11
ASA Târgu Mureș	1977–78	Divizia A	31	3	2 (Note: Two appearances in 1977–78 UEFA Cup)	0	0	0	33	3
ASA Târgu Mureș	1978–79	Divizia A	32	3	0	0	0	0	32	3
ASA Târgu Mureș	1979–80	Divizia A	26	6	0	0	0	0	26	6
ASA Târgu Mureș	1980–81	Divizia A	31	6	0	0	0	0	31	6
ASA Târgu Mureș	1981–82	Divizia A	31	10	0	0	0	0	31	10
ASA Târgu Mureș	1982–83	Divizia A	32	7	0	0	0	0	32	7
ASA Târgu Mureș	1983–84	Divizia A	30	7	0	0	0	0	30	7
ASA Târgu Mureș	Total		406	64	6	0	0	0	412	64
Steaua București	1984–85	Divizia A	24	3	1 (Note: One appearance in the 1984–85 European Cup Winners' Cup)	0	0	0	25	3
Steaua București	1985–86	Divizia A	31	9	9 (Note: Nine appearances and one goal in the 1985–86 European Cup)	1	0	0	40	10
Steaua București	1986–87	Divizia A	28	10	1 (Note: One appearance and one goal in the 1986–87 European Cup)	1	1 (Note: One appearance in 1986 European Super Cup)	0	30	10
Steaua București	1987–88	Divizia A	14	2	4 (Note: Four appearances and one goal in the 1987–88 European Cup)	1	0	0	18	3
Steaua București	Total		97	24	15	3	1	0	113	27
Racing Jet Brussels	1987–88	Belgian Pro League	16	0	0	0	0	0	16	0
Créteil	1988–89	French Division 2	11	2	0	0	0	0	11	2
Orléans	1989–90	French Division 2	32	4	0	0	0	0	32	4
Orléans	1990–91	French Division 2	27	0	0	0	0	0	27	0
Orléans	1991–92	French Division 2	18	0	0	0	0	0	18	0
Orléans	Total		77	4	0	0	0	0	77	4
Career total			607	94	21	3	1	0	628	97

=== International ===
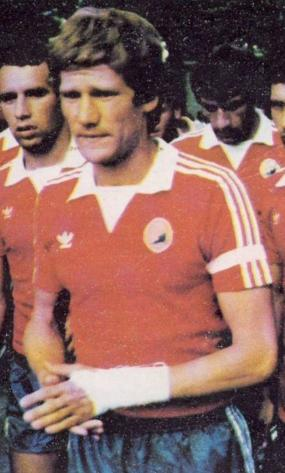
Bölöni playing for Romania in 1984

Scores and results list Romania's goal tally first, score column indicates score after each Bölöni goal.

List of international goals scored by László Bölöni
No.	Date	Venue	Opponent	Score	Result	Competition
1	2 July 1976	Aryamehr Stadium, Tehran, Iran	Iran	1–1	2–2	Friendly
2	29 November 1976	23 August Stadium, Bucharest, Romania	Bulgaria	2–1	3–2	Balkan Cup
3	21 September 1977	Stadionul Steaua, Bucharest, Romania	Greece	2–0	6–1	Friendly
4	21 September 1977	Stadionul Steaua, Bucharest, Romania	Greece	4–1	6–1	Friendly
5	15 November 1977	Stadionul Steaua, Bucharest, Romania	Yugoslavia	3–2	4–6	1978 FIFA World Cup qualification
6	16 February 1980	Stadio San Paolo, Naples, Italy	Italy	1–0	1–2	Friendly
7	14 April 1982	Lokomotiv Stadium, Rousse, Bulgaria	Bulgaria	2–1	2–1	Friendly
8	1 May 1982	Corvinul Stadium, Hunedoara, Romania	Cyprus	3–1	3–1	UEFA Euro 1984 qualification
9	15 August 1982	Areni Stadium, Suceava, Romania	Japan	3–0	4–0	Friendly
10	18 August 1982	23 August Stadium, Bucharest, Romania	Japan	1–1	3–1	Friendly
11	2 February 1983	Alkazar Stadium, Larissa, Greece	Greece	1–0	3–1	Friendly
12	9 March 1983	Stadionul Steaua, Bucharest, Romania	Turkey	3–1	3–1	Friendly
13	16 April 1983	23 August Stadium, Bucharest, Romania	Italy	1–0	1–0	UEFA Euro 1984 qualification
14	12 November 1983	Tsirion Stadium, Limassol, Cyprus	Cyprus	1–0	1–0	UEFA Euro 1984 qualification
15	22 January 1984	Estadio Modelo, Guayaquil, Ecuador	Ecuador	1–0	3–1	Friendly
16	14 June 1984	Stade Geoffroy-Guichard Saint-Étienne, France	Spain	1–1	1–1	UEFA Euro 1984
17	8 October 1986	Ramat Gan Stadium, Israel	Israel	2–1	4–2	Friendly
18	4 March 1987	19 Mayıs Stadium, Ankara, Turkey	Turkey	2–1	3–1	Friendly
19	25 March 1987	23 August Stadium, Bucharest, Romania	Albania	2–1	5–1	UEFA Euro 1988 qualification
20	2 September 1987	Stadion Zawiszy, Bydgoszcz, Poland	Poland	1–3	1–3	Friendly
21	7 October 1987	Stadionul Steaua, Bucharest, Romania	Greece	2–2	2–2	Friendly
22	3 February 1988	Kiryat Eliezer Stadium, Haifa, Israel	Israel	1–0	2–0	Friendly
23	30 March 1988	Kurt-Wabbel Stadion, Halle, Germany	East Germany	1–1	3–3	Friendly

== Managerial statistics ==
As of match played 2 June 2024

Managerial record by team and tenure
Team	From	To	Record				
Team	From	To	P	W	D	L	Win %
(France) Nancy-Lorraine	July 1994	June 2000	256	97	78	81	37.89
Romania	July 2000	June 2001	13	8	2	3	61.54
(Portugal) Sporting CP	July 2001	June 2003	90	53	21	16	58.89
(France) Rennes	July 2003	June 2006	135	57	26	52	42.22
Monaco	July 2006	October 2006	11	3	1	7	27.27
(United Arab Emirates) Al-Jazeera	June 2007	June 2008	19	9	5	5	47.37
(Belgium) Standard Liège	9 June 2008	10 February 2010	81	42	19	20	51.85
(United Arab Emirates) Al-Wahda	29 May 2010	2 September 2010	1	0	0	1	0.00
(France) Lens	1 January 2011	26 May 2011	21	4	7	10	19.05
(Greece) PAOK	8 June 2011	25 May 2012	51	24	14	13	47.06
(Qatar) Al Khor	1 July 2012	30 June 2015	74	19	32	23	25.68
(Saudi Arabia) Al Ittihad	1 July 2015	17 November 2015	9	6	1	2	66.67
(Belgium) Antwerp	16 June 2017	15 May 2020	118	52	32	34	44.07
(Belgium) Gent	20 August 2020	14 September 2020	3	1	0	2	33.33
(Greece) Panathinaikos	19 October 2020	10 May 2021	32	14	8	10	43.75
(France) Metz	1 June 2022	4 July 2024	78	30	18	30	38.46
Total			992	419	264	309	42.24

== Honours ==
=== Player ===
ASA Târgu Mureș

- Divizia B: 1970–71
- Balkans Cup runner-up: 1973

Steaua București

- Divizia A: 1984–85, 1985–86, 1986–87
- Cupa României: 1984–85, 1986–87
- European Cup: 1985–86
- European Super Cup: 1986
- Intercontinental Cup runner-up: 1986

Romania

- Balkan Cup: 1977–80

Individual

- Romanian Footballer of the Year: 1977, 1983, (runner-up): 1976, 1986, (third place): 1985, (fourth place): 1982, 1987,

=== Coach ===
Nancy

- Division 2: 1997–98

Sporting CP

- Primeira Liga: 2001–02
- Taça de Portugal: 2001–02
- Supertaça Cândido de Oliveira: 2002

Al Jazira

- Gulf Club Champions Cup: 2007

Standard Liège

- Belgian First Division: 2008–09
- Belgian Super Cup: 2008, 2009

Al Khor

- Gulf Club Champions Cup runner-up: 2013

Individual

- Belgian Manager of the Year: 2009

== See also ==
- List of men's footballers with 100 or more international caps
