= Bahnea =

Bahnea Bonyha
- Commune
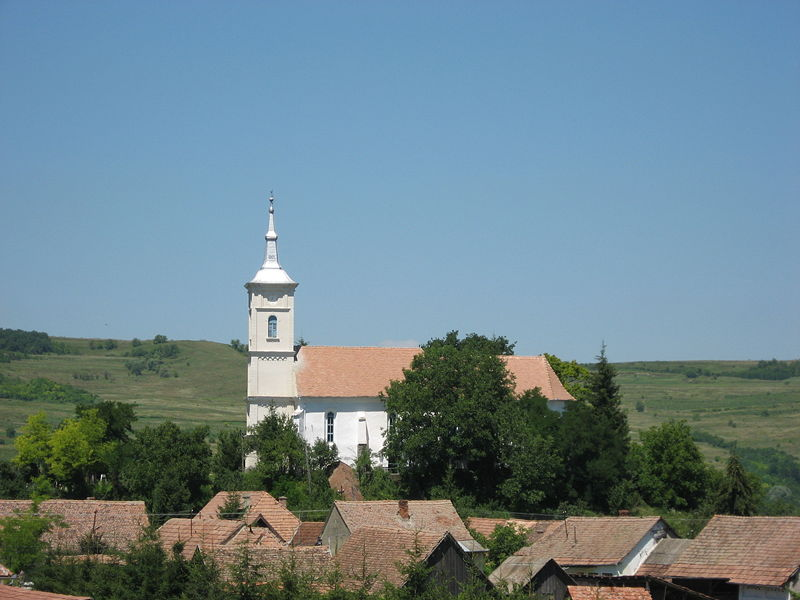
- Reformed church

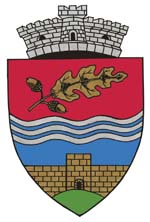
- Coat of arms

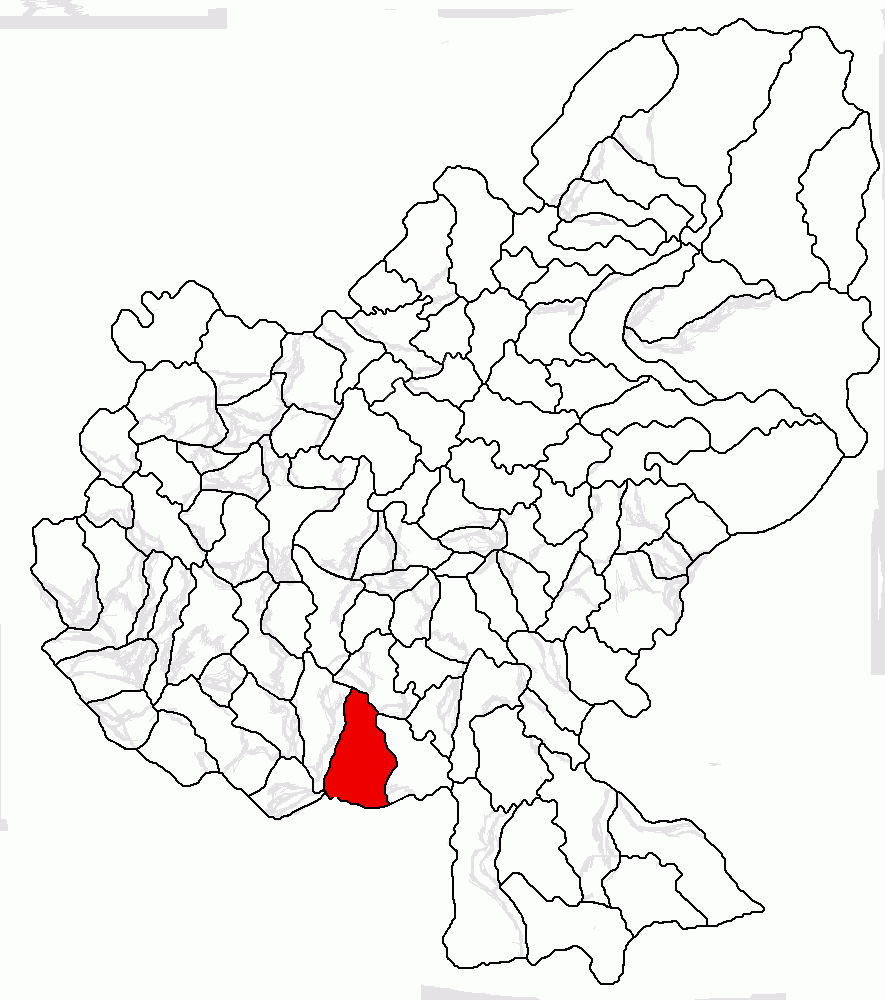
- Location in Mureș County

- Location in Romania
- Coordinates: 46°22′N 24°29′E
- Country: Romania
- County: Mureș

Government
  - Mayor (2020–2024): Ioan Jors (PNL)
- Area: 91.65 km^{2} (35.39 sq mi)
- Elevation: 300 m (980 ft)
- Population (2021-12-01): 3,528
  - Density: 38.49/km^{2} (99.70/sq mi)
- Time zone: UTC+02:00 (EET)
  - Summer (DST): UTC+03:00 (EEST)
- Postal code: 547055
- Area code: (+40) 0265
- Vehicle reg.: MS
- Website: comunabahnea.ro

Bahnea (Hungarian: Bonyha; Hungarian pronunciation: [ˈbonihɒ], until 1898 Szászbonyha; German: Bachnen) is a commune in Mureș County, Transylvania, Romania. It is composed of seven villages: Bahnea, Bernadea (Bernád), Cund (Kund; Reussdorf), Daia (Dányán), Gogan (Gógán), Idiciu (Jövedics), and Lepindea (Leppend).

== Geography ==
The commune is situated on the Transylvanian Plateau, at an altitude of 300 m (980 ft), on the banks of the river Târnava Mică and its left tributary, the Cund. The river Idiciu flows into the Cund in Bahnea village.

Bahnea commune is located in the southern part of Mureș County, 16 km (10 mi) from Târnăveni and 26 km (16 mi) from the county seat, Târgu Mureș, on the border with Sibiu County.

== Demographics ==
At the 2011 census, the commune had 3,739 inhabitants, of which 35.1% were Roma, 33.3% Romanians, and 30.8% Hungarians. At the 2021 census, Bahnea had a population of 3,528; of those, 39.63% were Romanians, 32.54% Roma, and 22.19% Hungarians.

== Natives ==
- Kata Bethlen (1700–1759), memoirist
- Domokos Bölöni (born 1946), writer and journalist
- Árpád Fazekas (born 1949), footballer

== See also ==
- List of Hungarian exonyms (Mureș County)
