= Idiciu =

- Location within Romania

Location
- Country: Romania
- Counties: Mureș County
- Villages: Idiciu, Lepindea, Bahnea

Physical characteristics
- Mouth: Cund
  - location: Bahnea
  - coordinates: 46.3789°N 24.4668°E
- Length: 15 km (9.3 mi)
- Basin size: 41 km^{2} (16 sq mi)

Basin features
- Progression: Cund→ Târnava Mică→ Târnava→ Mureș→ Tisza→ Danube→ Black Sea

The Idiciu is a left tributary of the river Cund in Romania. It flows into the Cund in Bahnea. Its length is 15 km (9.3 mi) and its basin size is 41 km^{2} (16 sq mi).
