= Okan Chatziterzoglou =

Greek footballer (born 1996)

Personal information
- Date of birth: 5 March 1996 (age 30)
- Place of birth: Xanthi, Greece
- Height: 1.87 m (6 ft 2 in)
- Position: Centre-back

Team information
- Current team: ASA Târgu Mureș
- Number: 22

Youth career
- –2015: Xanthi

Senior career*
Years	Team	Apps	(Gls)
2015–2019	Xanthi	16	(0)
2017–2018	→ Panserraikos (loan)	7	(0)
2019–2020	Academica Clinceni	15	(0)
2020–2021	Apollon Larissa	2	(0)
2021	Ierapetra	10	(0)
2021–2022	Politehnica Iași	20	(1)
2022–2023	Metaloglobus București	28	(2)
2024	Tilikratis	8	(0)
2024	Aris Avato		
2025	SCM Zalău		
2025–	ASA Târgu Mureș	24	(3)

International career
2015	Greece U19	2	(0)
2016–2017	Greece U21	3	(0)
- * Club domestic league appearances and goals as of 22 September 2026

Okan Chatziterzoglou (Greek: Οκάν Χατζητερζόγλου; born 5 March 1996) is a Greek professional footballer who plays as a centre-back for Liga II club ASA Târgu Mureș.

== Career ==
In his career, Chatziterzoglou also played for teams such as Xanthi and Panserraikos.
