= Cund =

- Location within Romania

Location
- Country: Romania
- Counties: Mureș County
- Villages: Cund, Gogan, Bahnea

Physical characteristics
- Mouth: Târnava Mică
  - location: Bernadea
  - coordinates: 46.3817°N 24.4592°E
- Length: 18 km (11 mi)

Basin features
- Progression: Târnava Mică→ Târnava→ Mureș→ Tisza→ Danube→ Black Sea
- Tributaries
  - left: Idiciu

The Cund is a left tributary of the river Târnava Mică in Romania. It discharges into the Târnava Mică near Bernadea. Its length is 18 km (11 mi).
