= Meseș Tunnel =

Proposed road tunnel in Romania

Overview
- Location: Sălaj County, Crișana, Romania
- Coordinates: 47.1431991°N 23.0803316°E
- Route: A3 Motorway
- Crosses: Meseș Mountains
- Start: Ciumărna
- End: Zalău

Technical
- Length: 2.89 km (1.80 mi)
- No. of lanes: 4

The Meseș Tunnel (Romanian: Tunelul Meseș) is a future automotive tunnel located near Zalău, in Sălaj County, Crișana, Romania, which is planned be part of the route of the A3 Transylvania Motorway, specifically the Poarta Sălajului - Zalău segment (subsection 3B3) (12,9 km). It is named after the Meseș Mountains (Romanian: Munții Meseș), the mountain range belonging to the Apuseni Mountains, which forms part of the Carpathians. When completed, it will be the longest road tunnel in Romania, being 2.89 kilometres (1.80 mi) long,

== Design ==
The Meseș Tunnel is one of the largest structures along the route of the Transylvania Motorway, the other one being the partially built Suplacu de Barcău Viaduct over the accumulation lake located at Suplacu de Barcău, Bihor County. As part of a controlled-access highway, it will have two galleries, make use of immersed tube construction techniques and is planned to have two lanes per direction (4 in total) and sidewalks, but will not have an emergency lane (hard shoulder).

== History ==
=== Feasibility studies ===
The original feasibility study for the Transylvania Motorway involved excavations 42 meters deep and 120 meters wide near Zalău. Originally, the motorway section which presently includes the Meseș Tunnel, was scheduled to be built by the American company Bechtel as part of the Transylvania Motorway (A3) that would connect Brașov to the Hungarian border and further to Central and Western Europe via Târgu Mureș, Cluj-Napoca and Zalău (entirely 415 km), as the contract was awarded in 2004 to the company by the Romanian government, then led by Adrian Năstase, with the deadline in 8 years.

The contract with the American company was terminated in 2013, with only around 50 km completed. Two years later, the National Company of Motorways and National Roads of Romania (CNADNR) signed in April 2015 a contract with Technic Consulting Engineering Romania for a new feasibility study for a tunnel in the same area, at the price of 1 million lei for a period of 12 months. The auction for the feasibility study was launched in 2014, with the aim to avoid the excavation works in the same area that were decided in 2004.

In June 2017, the route of the tunnel was established. With a length of 2.89 km (1.80 mi), it would exceed the length of the 884 m long Capra-Bâlea tunnel on the Transfăgărășan (DN7C), back then the longest tunnel by length in Romania, built in 1972 during the communist regime, thus becoming the new longest tunnel.

In July 2020, after over 5 years since the contract for the feasibility study was signed, the Romanian Ministry of Transport announced that it began preparations for beginning the expropriations necessary for the construction of the Meseș tunnel, and that the auction for the subsections 3B3 and 3B4 of the A3 motorway would be launched by 30 July 2020. During this phase, the CNAIR/CNADNR applied multiple penalties on the company working on the feasibility study due to the massive delays, in total worth 278.000 lei.

=== Auction ===
4 months after the first announcement, the auction for the Poarta Sălajului - Zalău segment (subsection 3B3) of the A3 motorway containing the Meseș tunnel, which also included the Zalău - Nușfalău segment (subsection 3B4), totalling about 41,0 km, was announced in November 2020, with a cost of approximatively 800 million euros or 4 billion lei (excluding VAT). The contract involved projecting of the motorway section, a phase which would take 12 months to complete, followed by construction for another 36 months. Due to the high difficulty of the road section, the auction was with pre-qualification.

The then-Minister of Transport, Lucian Bode, stated in the auction announcement that Sălaj's inhabitants should know that, in the condition that the builder will follow the deadline, all segments of the motorway located inside the Sălaj County will be available for use in "late 2024" or "early 2025".

The NGO Asociația Pro Infrastructură stated in late November 2020 that it found a series of negative aspects in the documentation, from which includes the fact that only 6 drillings were made in the area of the tunnel's portals, among with other problems.

As of early 2022, the auction for the subsection 3B3 is still ongoing, with the contract for the project and construction works yet to be signed.

== See also ==
- A3 motorway (Romania)
- Suplacu de Barcău Viaduct
- Roads in Romania
- Transport in Romania
