= Iuliu Hajnal =

Romanian footballer

Personal information
- Date of birth: 30 August 1951 (age 75)
- Place of birth: Suplacu de Barcău, Romania
- Positions: Midfielder; forward

Senior career*
Years	Team	Apps	(Gls)
1969–1983	ASA Târgu Mureș (Note: The statistics for the 1970–71 Divizia B season are unavailable.)	381	(77)

International career
1973	Romania U21	1	(0)
1971–1975	Romania U23	11	(0)
1975	Romania B	1	(0)
1975–1976	Romania Olympic	4	(1)
1972–1978	Romania	12	(3)

Managerial career
- 2017–2019: FC Pănet
- 2019: MSE Târgu Mureș
- * Club domestic league appearances and goals

Iuliu Hajnal (born 30 August 1951) is a Romanian former international footballer who played as a midfielder.

== International career ==
He earned 12 international caps for Romania scoring 3 goals, making his debut under coach Angelo Niculescu when he came as a substitute and replaced Flavius Domide in the 75th minute of a friendly which ended 3–3 against Italy in which he scored the final goal of the game. His following two goals were in two friendlies, a 4–1 victory against Japan and a 2–2 against the Soviet Union. Hajnal also played two games at the 1973–76 Balkan Cup, one at the 1977–80 Balkan Cup and in a 1–1 against Scotland at the Euro 1976 qualifiers. His last game for the national team was a friendly against Argentina which ended with a 2–0 loss.

=== International goals ===
Scores and results list Romania's goal tally first. "Score" column indicates the score after the player's goal.

#	Date	Venue	Opponent	Score	Result	Competition
1.	17 June 1972	23 August Stadium, Bucharest, Romania	Italy	3–3	3–3	Friendly
2.	23 July 1974	Stadionul 1 Mai, Constanța, Romania	Japan	4–1	4–1	Friendly
3.	29 November 1975	23 August Stadium, Bucharest, Romania	Soviet Union	2–2	2–2	Friendly

== Honours ==
=== Player ===
ASA Târgu Mureş

- Divizia A runner-up: 1974–75
- Divizia B: 1970–71
