= Horațiu Cioloboc =

Romanian footballer

Personal information
- Full name: Horațiu Daniel Cioloboc
- Date of birth: 29 September 1967 (age 59)
- Place of birth: Râciu, Romania
- Height: 1.87 m (6 ft 2 in)
- Positions: Attacking midfielder; central midfielder; central defender

Senior career*
Years	Team	Apps	(Gls)
1984–1986	Mureșul Toplița		
1986–1989	Metalotehnica Târgu Mureș		
1989–1992	ASA Târgu Mureș (Note: The statistics for the 1989–90 Divizia B season are unavailable.)	43	(9)
1992–1993	Universitatea Craiova	28	(8)
1993–1995	Oțelul Galați	45	(8)
1995–1996	Universitatea Cluj	45	(6)
1997	Gloria Bistrița	14	(0)
1997–1999	Universitatea Cluj	56	(8)
1999–2000	ASA Târgu Mureș	27	(12)
2000–2003	Gloria Bistrița	66	(6)
Total		324	(57)

International career
1991	Romania	2	(0)
- * Club domestic league appearances and goals

Horațiu Daniel Cioloboc (born 29 September 1967) is a Romanian former footballer who played as a midfielder.

== International career ==
Horațiu Cioloboc played two friendly games at international level for Romania against Egypt.

== Honours ==
ASA Târgu Mureș

- Divizia B: 1990–91

Universitatea Craiova

- Cupa României: 1992–93
