= Suplacu de Barcău Viaduct =

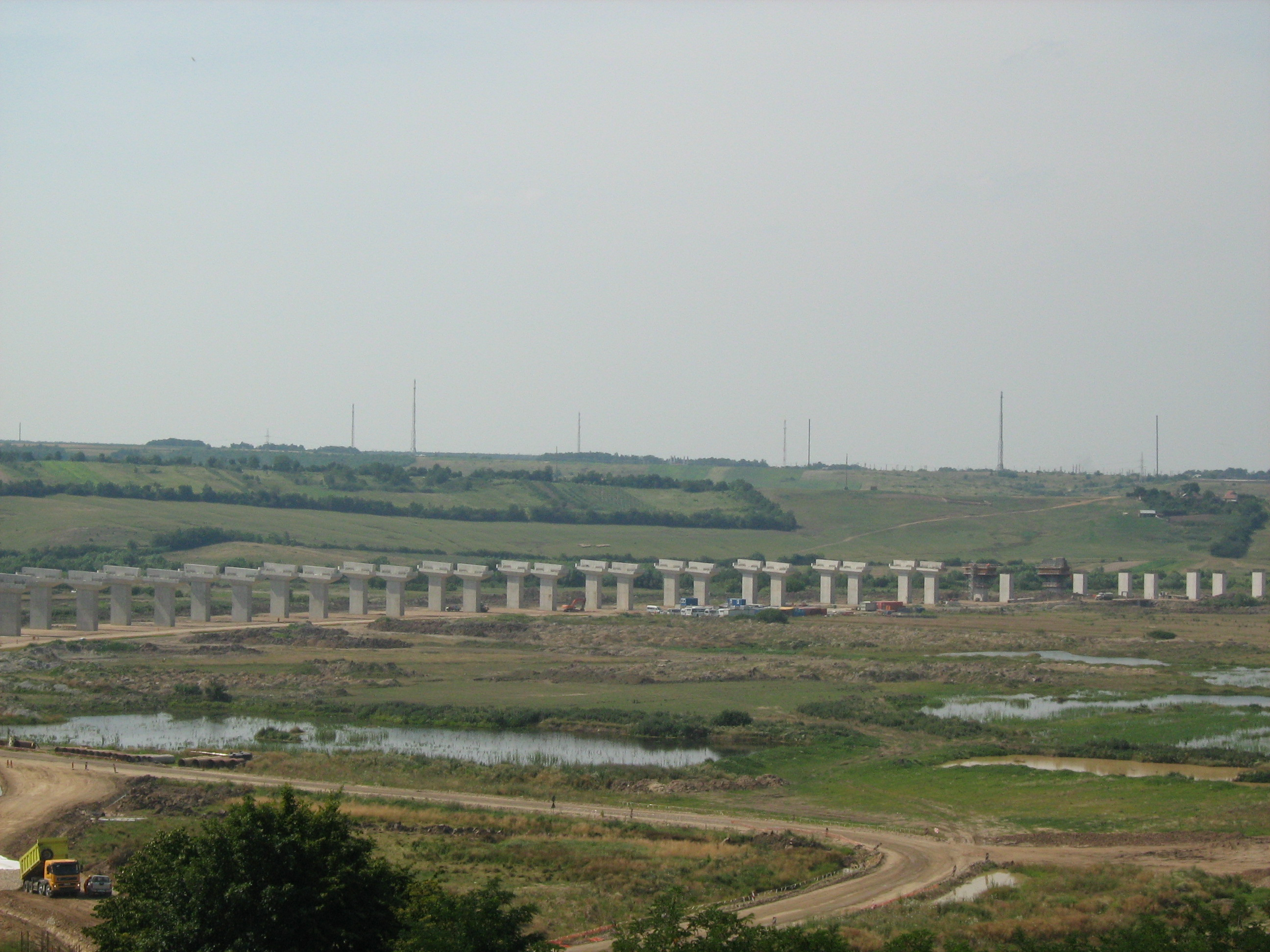
- Coordinates: 47°14′23″N 22°31′12″E
- Carries: Motorway four lanes
- Locale: between Suplacu de Barcău and Borș

Characteristics
- Total length: 1,800 m

History
- Opened: 2014

The Suplacu de Barcău Viaduct (Hungarian: Berettyószéplaki völgyhíd) is a future viaduct between Suplacu de Barcău and Borș, Romania. 90% of its course is already built. The remaining part was abandoned by the American company Bechtel, on the route of the future A3 Transylvania Motorway.

Suplacu de Barcău viaduct is the largest structure along the length of the Transylvania Motorway and will be, once completed, the largest viaduct in southeast Europe. The viaduct will be a traditional piled structure with a length of 1.8 km (1.1 mi) and 45 spans of 40 m (130 ft).

To build this structure will require 88,000 m^{3} (115,000 cu yd) of concrete, 6.5 tonnes of reinforcement steel, and 1.3 tonnes of stressing cable, 360 pre-cast U-beams each weighing 160 tonnes. Construction work at the viaduct is underway and includes foundation activities, piling installation, reinforcement of concrete pile caps, pier elevations and pier heads. The next phase of construction will involve the U-Beam installation and afterwards, once the U-beams are installed, the placement of the deck slab. Finally, when the deck is completed, the paving activities will be ready to start.

== See also ==
- A3 motorway
- Meseș Tunnel
- Roads in Romania
