= Ladislau Bölöni Stadium (Târgu Mureș) =

Multi-purpose stadium in Târgu Mureș, Romania

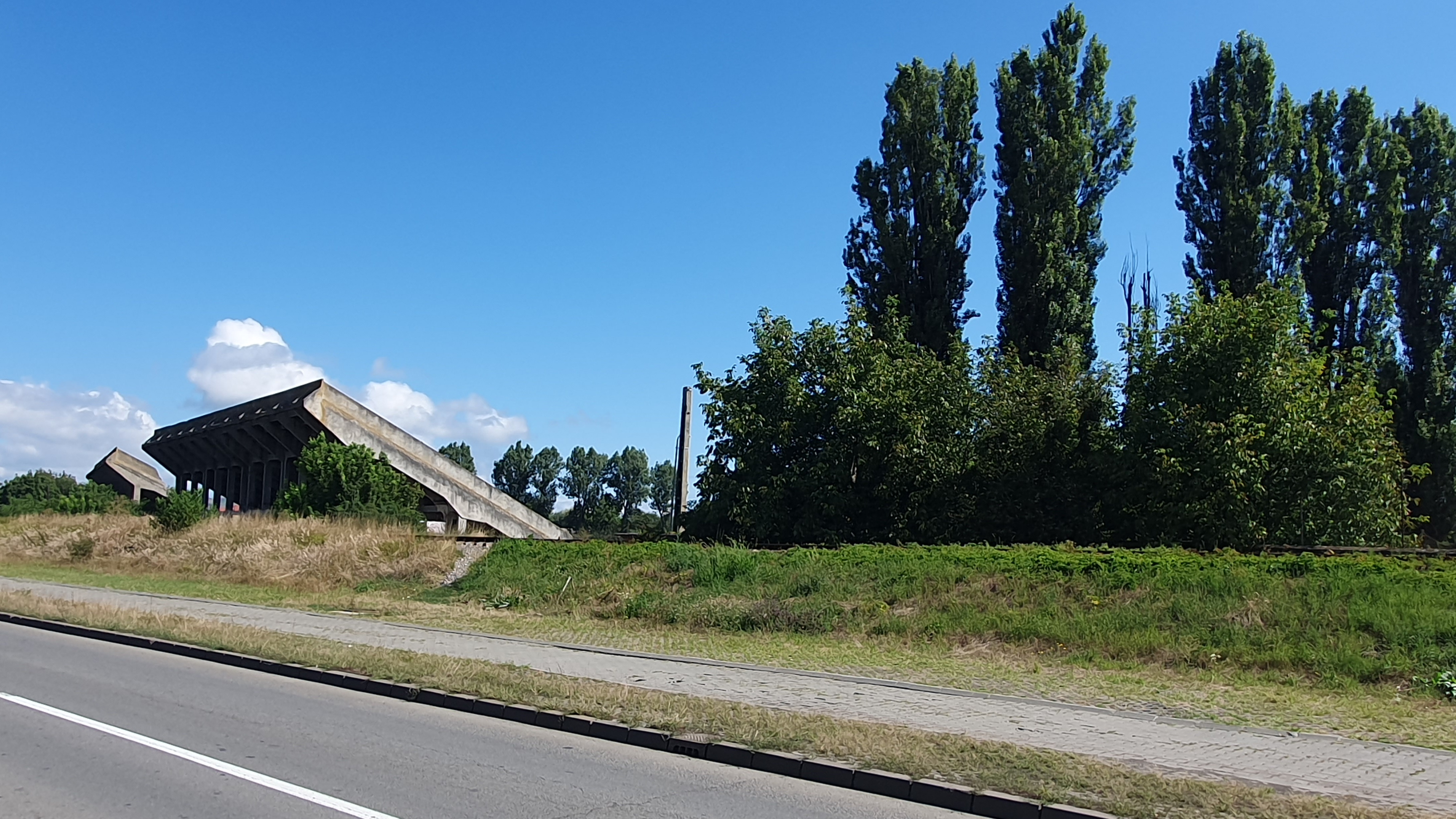
- Interactive map of Ladislau Bölöni Stadium
- Address: Str. Insulei
- Location: Târgu Mureș, Romania
- Coordinates: 46°32′57.4″N 24°32′55.2″E
- Owner: Ministry of Sport
- Capacity: 15,000 seated
- Surface: Grass

Construction
- Opened: 1920s
- Renovated: 1970s
- Closed: 2010s

Tenant
- ASA Târgu Mureș (1962–2004)

The Ladislau Bölöni Stadium is a multi-purpose stadium in Târgu Mureș, Romania.

The ground currently is in a very bad shape of disrepair and it is closed since the beginning of 2010s. Years ago was the home ground of ASA Târgu Mureș. It has a capacity of 15,000 people and is named after Ladislau Bölöni.
