= Dumitru Unchiașu =

Romanian footballer

Personal information
- Date of birth: 6 July 1951 (age 75)
- Place of birth: Târnăveni, Romania
- Position: Defender

Senior career*
Years	Team	Apps	(Gls)
1968–1969	Chimica Târnăveni	24	(0)
1969–1970	Colorom Codlea	28	(0)
1970–1971	Petrolul Ploiești (Note: The statistics for the 1970–1971 youth championship are not taken into consideration.)	0	(0)
1971–1975	ASA Târgu Mureș	43	(1)
1975–1976	Politehnica Iași	31	(0)
1976–1982	ASA Târgu Mureș	171	(3)
Total		297	(4)
- * Club domestic league appearances and goals

Dumitru Unchiașu (born 6 July 1951) is a Romanian former football defender.
