= Domokos Bölöni =

Hungarian writer

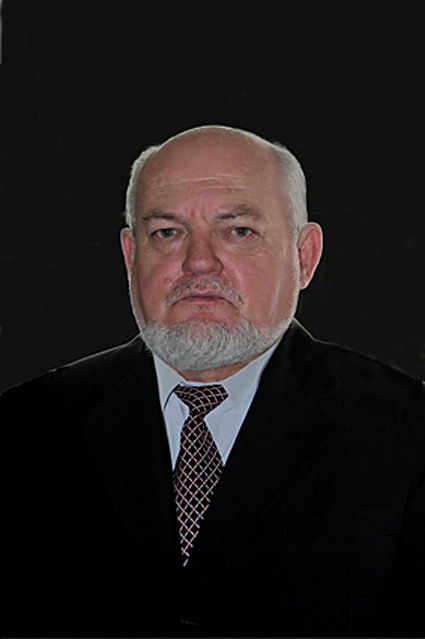
Domokos Bölöni (2007)

Domokos Bölöni (Daia, August 11, 1946) is a Romanian Magyar writer and journalist.

After studying in Târnăveni, he studied the Romanian Hungarian language in Târgu Mureş. He has worked as a teacher in Corund and as a journalist for Népújság. He is married and has three children and three grandchildren.

== Works ==
- Hullámok boldogsága (1980)
- A szárnyas ember, Bucharest (1986)
- Harangoznak Rossz Pistának, Târgu Mureș (1992)
- Egek, harmatozzatok! (1995)
- Bot és fapénz (1999)
- A próféták elhallgattak (2002)
- A nevető gödör (2004)
- Jézus megcibálja Pricskili Dungónak a fülét (2006)
- Széles utcán jár a bánat (2007)
- Elindult a hagymalé (2009)
- Micsobur reinkarnációja (2010)
- Küküllőmadár (2011)

== Prizes ==
- Igaz Szó (1985)
- Magyar Napló Önismeret az ezredfordulón (1988)
- Látó (1992)
