= Nicolae Nagy =

Romanian footballer

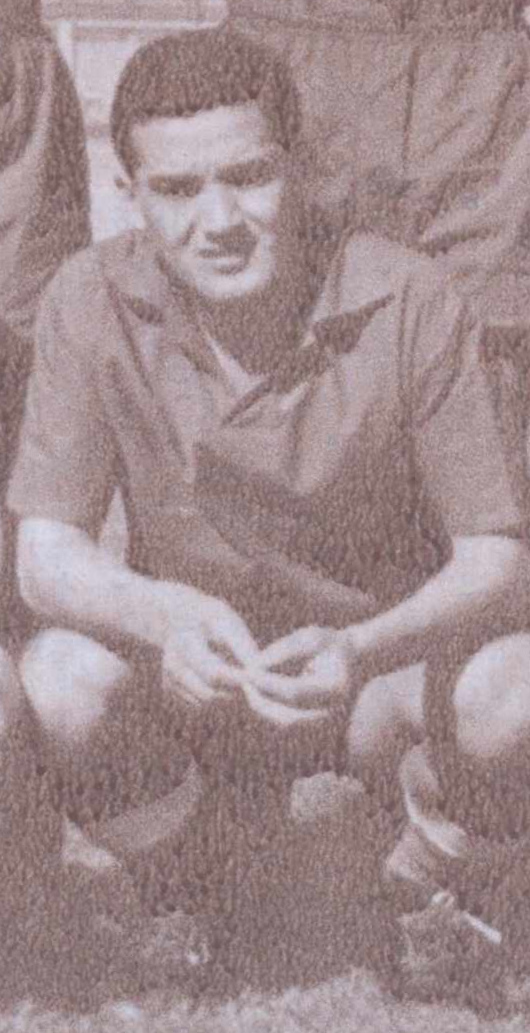

Personal information
- Date of birth: 8 March 1942 (age 84)
- Place of birth: Marosvásárhely, Hungary
- Height: 1.72 m (5 ft 8 in)
- Position: Forward

Youth career
- 1957–1961: Avântul Târgu Mureș

Senior career*
Years	Team	Apps	(Gls)
1961–1962	Mureșul Târgu Mureș	22	(10)
1962	Viitorul București	1	(0)
1963	Dinamo Obor București		
1963–1967	Dinamo Pitești	85	(57)
1967–1969	Dinamo București	22	(8)
1969–1977	ASA Târgu Mureș	222	(64)
1977–1978	Gaz Metan Mediaș		
Total		352	(139)

International career
1965–1966	Romania U23	6	(1)
1966	Romania	1	(0)
- * Club domestic league appearances and goals

Nicolae Nagy (born 8 March 1942) is a Romanian former football forward.

== Club career ==
Nagy was born 8 March 1942 in Marosvásárhely, Hungary (today Târgu Mureș in Romania), and began playing junior-level football in 1957 at local club Avântul. In 1961, he started his senior career at Mureșul Târgu Mureș in Divizia B. In 1962 he joined Viitorul București where he made his Divizia A debut on 9 September under coach Gheorghe Ola in a 0–0 draw against Știința Cluj. After only one appearance for Viitorul, Nagy went back to the second league to play for Dinamo Obor București.

In 1963 he returned to first league football, signing with Dinamo Pitești, where his first performance was reaching the 1965 Cupa României final, being used by coach Virgil Mărdărescu the entire match in the 2–1 loss to Știința Cluj. In the 1965–66 season, he scored a personal record of 22 goals, being the second top-scorer of the league with only two goals behind Rapid București's Ion Ionescu. Nagy appeared in five games in the 1966–67 Inter-Cities Fairs Cup, where in the first two rounds they eliminated Sevilla against which he scored two goals and Toulouse, being defeated in the third round with 1–0 on aggregate by Dinamo Zagreb who eventually won the competition.

Afterwards in 1967 Nagy went to play for two seasons at Dinamo București. The highlights of this period were a goal scored in a 2–0 win over rivals Steaua București and reaching the 1968 Cupa României final where coach Bazil Marian used him as a starter until the 77th minute when he replaced him with Mircea Lucescu in the eventual 3–1 victory against Rapid București. He then joined ASA Târgu Mureș where in his first season the team was relegated, but Nagy stayed with club, helping it get promoted back to the first league after one year. His spell at ASA consisted of eight seasons in which he also played three games in the UEFA Cup over the course of two editions. Nagy made his last Divizia A appearance on 30 June 1977 in ASA's 3–1 away win over FCM Galați in which he scored once, totaling 300 matches with 118 goals in the competition. He ended his career one year later after spending one season in Divizia B at Gaz Metan Mediaș.

== International career ==
Between 1965 and 1966, Nagy made six appearances with one goal scored for Romania's under-23 squad.

He played one game for Romania under coach Ilie Oană in a 2–1 friendly victory against Israel.

== Honours ==
Dinamo Pitești

- Cupa României runner-up: 1964–65

Dinamo București

- Cupa României: 1967–68

ASA Târgu Mureș

- Divizia B: 1970–71
