= Petre Varodi =

Romanian footballer (born 1949)

Personal information
- Date of birth: 18 February 1949 (age 77)
- Place of birth: Reghin, Romania
- Position: Central midfielder

Youth career
- 1961–1968: Avântul Reghin

Senior career*
Years	Team	Apps	(Gls)
1968–1969	Avântul Reghin	15	(0)
1969–1980	ASA Târgu Mureș	254	(20)
1981–1982	Avântul Reghin		
Total		269	(20)
- * Club domestic league appearances and goals

Petre Varodi (born 18 February 1949) is a Romanian former football midfielder.

== Honours ==
ASA Târgu Mureș

- Divizia B: 1970–71
