= Árpád Fazekas (footballer, born 1949) =

Romanian footballer (born 1949)

Personal information
- Date of birth: 20 July 1949 (age 77)
- Place of birth: Bahnea, Socialist Republic of Romania
- Position: Midfielder

Senior career*
Years	Team	Apps	(Gls)
1967–1969	Chimica Târnăveni		
1969–1982	ASA Târgu Mureș (Note: The statistics for the 1970–71 Divizia B season are unavailable.)	291	(36)

International career
1975–1976	Romania	3	(0)

Managerial career
- CS Iernut
- Înfrățirea Valea Izvoarelor
- * Club domestic league appearances and goals

Árpád Fazekas (born 20 July 1949) is a Romanian former international footballer who played as a midfielder.

== Career ==
Born in Bahnea, Fazekas played for Chimica Târnăveni and ASA Târgu Mureș.

He earned three international caps for Romania, making his debut under coach Valentin Stănescu in a 1–1 against Greece at the 1973–76 Balkan Cup. Fazekas also appeared in two friendly games, a 2–2 against Turkey and a 4–2 defeat against Italy.

== Honours ==
ASA Târgu Mureș

- Divizia B: 1970–71
