= FC Gaz Metan Târgu Mureș =

Gaz Metan Târgu Mureș
- Full name: Fotbal Club Gaz Metan Târgu Mureș
- Nickname: Găzarii (The Refinery Workers)
- Short name: Gaz Metan
- Dissolved: 2018
- Ground: Mureșeni
- Capacity: 300
Home colours	Away colours

Fotbal Club Gaz Metan Târgu Mureș was a Romanian football club from Târgu Mureș.

In its history, Gaz Metan played for eight seasons in Liga III, between 2000 and 2009.

== History ==
Gaz Metan achieved promotion to the Divizia C, Romanian's third division, at the end of the 1999–2000 season, winning Divizia D – Mureș County.

During its first season in Divizia C, 2000–01, coached by Florea Ispir, Gaz Metan enjoying a good form finishing in 2nd place. In the following season, "Mureșenii" finished on the 8th place.

== Honours ==
Liga III:

- Runners-up (1): 2000–01

Liga IV – Mureș County

- Winners (3): 1999–2000, 2006–07, 2009–10
- Runners-up (3): 1988–89, 2010–11, 2012–13

Cupa României – Mureș County

- Winners (1): 2010–11

== League history ==
Season	Tier	Division	Place	Cupa României
2017–18	4	Liga IV (MS)	6th	
2016–17	4	Liga IV (MS)	10th	
2015–16	4	Liga IV (MS)	8th	
2014–15	4	Liga IV (MS)	8th	
2013–14	4	Liga IV (MS)	7th	
2012–13	4	Liga IV (MS)	2nd	
2011–12	4	Liga IV (MS)	7th	
2010–11	4	Liga IV (MS)	2nd	
2009–10	4	Liga IV (MS)	1st (C)	
2008–09	3	Liga III (Seria VI)	11th	

Season	Tier	Division	Place	Cupa României
2007–08	3	Liga III (Seria VII)	7th	
2006–07	4	Liga IV (MS)	1st (C, P)	
2005–06	3	Divizia C (Seria VIII)	12th (R)	
2004–05	3	Divizia C (Seria VIII)	9th	
2003–04	3	Divizia C (Seria XI)	3rd	
2002–03	3	Divizia C (Seria VII)	3rd	
2001–02	3	Divizia C (Seria VII)	8th	
2000–01	3	Divizia C (Seria VII)	2nd	
1999–00	4	Divizia D (MS)	1st (C, P)	
