= Kata Bethlen =

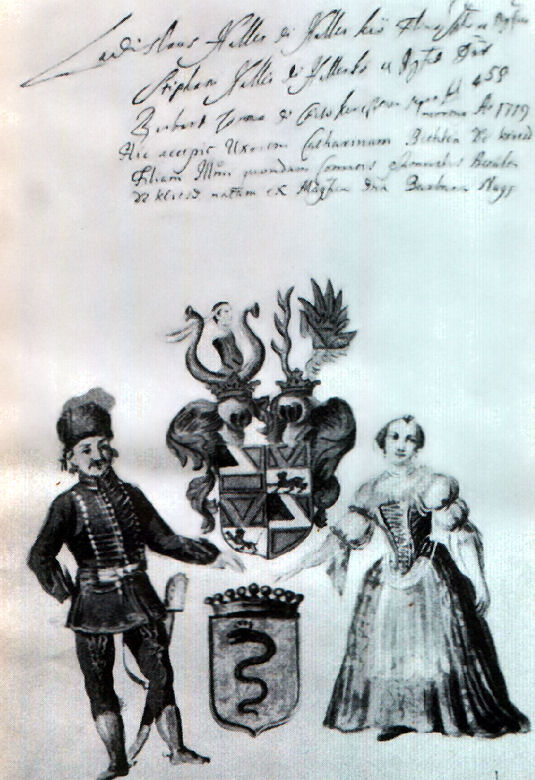

Countess Kata Bethlen de Bethlen (1700–1759), sometimes referred to as Katherine Bethlen, was one of the earliest Hungarians to write memoirs. She was born on November 25, 1700, in Bonyha, Hungary (now Bahnea, Romania), and died on July 29, 1759, in Fogaras, Hungary (now Făgăraș, Romania).

== Family and marriages ==
Kata Bethlen, as a member of the notable Bethlen family, was active in Hungary's cultural and intellectual life. She was the niece of the Chancellor of the Principality of Transylvania, Miklós Bethlen, and in her second marriage wed to the son of a later Chancellor, Mihály Teleki.

Her first marriage had been politically motivated, her Roman Catholic half-stepbrother being forced on her at the age of 17. The antagonism between her Protestantism and the Catholicism of her husband's family affected her strongly. Her husband's family denied her access to her children and her daughter's malicious teasing was mentioned in her writing. She remarried after the death of her first husband and was happier than with the first, but her husband and their children died early, after which Kata Bethlen assumed the epithet "orphaned."

Bethlen became mistress of her husband's large estates and active in fostering education in Transylvania. Much of this she described in her writings. As a patron of Péter Bod, the Protestant scholar and publisher, she supported printing and scholastic reform. Bod, her chaplain in 1743–1749, assembled for her one of the most important libraries of that period, which included over 500 manuscripts. However, this library was to be destroyed by fire in 1847.

== Written works ==
She published her writings as Védelmező, erős paizs (Protective, Strong Shield, 1759) and Bujdosásnak emlékezetköve (The Memoirs of her Exile, 1733). She also collected work that includes her letters: Gróf Bethleni Bethlen Kata életének maga által való rövid leírása (A Short Description of the Life of Countess Kata Bethlen Written by Herselfm written 1759, published 1762). These mirror her personal troubles, but also reflect political struggles of the day and the duties and tasks of leading families in them.

Her letters present her as clever and skillful. She encouraged industrial development on her estates, established gardens and nurseries to propagate better stock, acquired a paper-mill and glassworks, and employed numerous artisans, including embroiderers. She studied natural science to help her counteract the effect of natural disasters and persuade tenants to adopt progressive farming practices. Further, she learned medicine and pharmacology to better minister to the needs of her community and contributed generously to the advance of learning by establishing schools and scholarships, particularly the education of girls, which she felt sadly neglected. Her diary was primarily a personal response to the pressures her first husband's family put on her to convert, as a Protestant unhappily married to a Catholic. Her autobiography can be called a fine example of Baroque literature.

== Legacy ==
Kata Bethlen is a good representative of Hungarian Baroque, who unites the literature of her day with that of the 19th-century period of Reform. Her works blend in an interesting way traditional meditative lyrics and the popular genres of her time with her strongly Puritanical views. Her style draws on the memoirs of János Kemény and Miklós Bethlen, work closely related to Francis Rákóczi. Her letters compare with those of Mme de Sévigné and others at the Court of Louis XIV.
