= Metrom Stadium =

Sports venue in Brașov, Romania

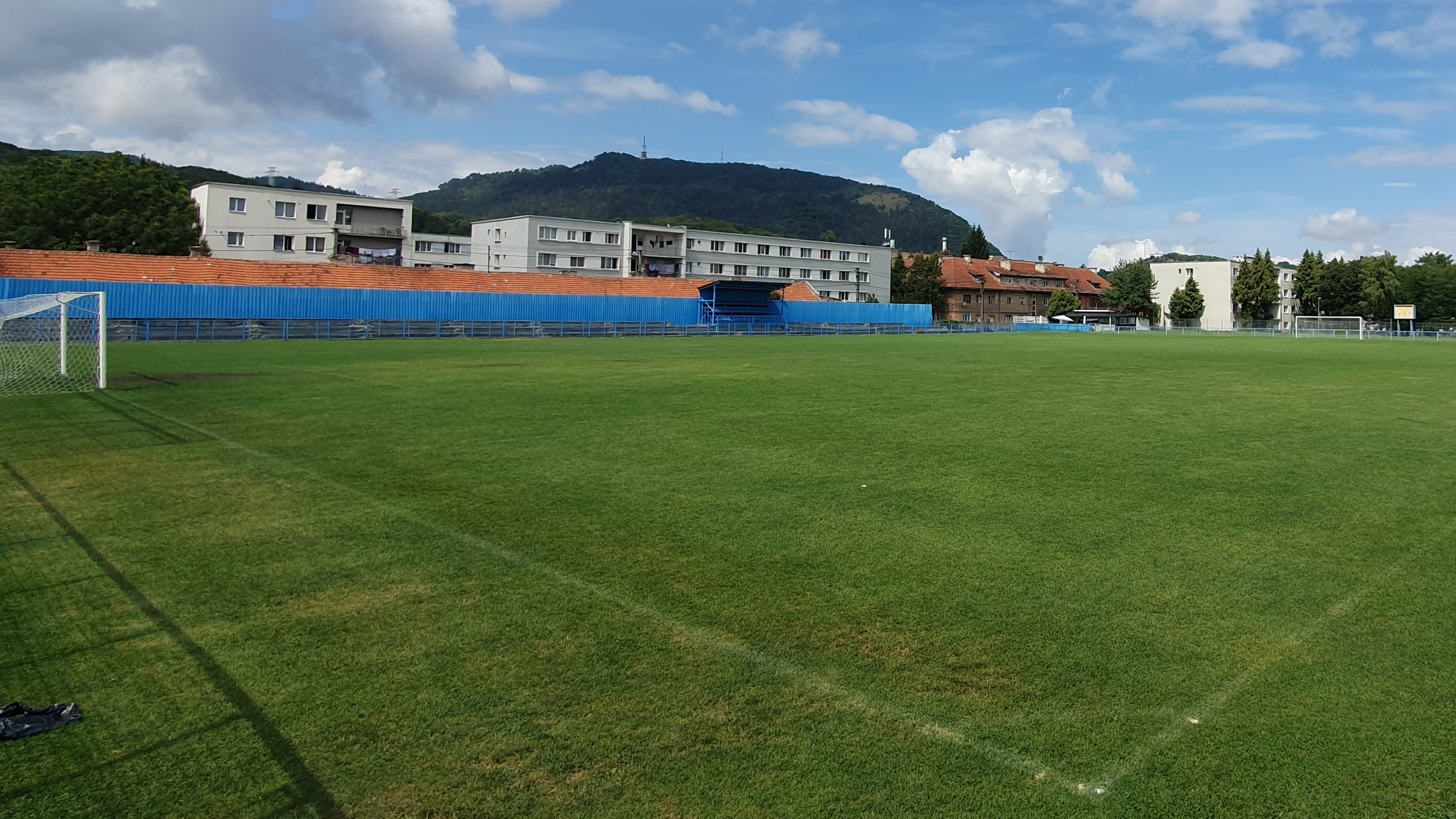
- Interactive map of Metrom Stadium
- Address: Str. Carpaților 66
- Location: Brașov, Romania
- Coordinates: 45°37′59.7″N 25°37′32.2″E
- Owner: Municipality of Brașov
- Operator: Corona Brașov
- Capacity: 1,056 (56 on seats)
- Surface: Grass

Construction
- Opened: 1930s
- Renovated: 2010s

Tenants
- Metrom Brașov (1937–2002); Various (2002–present)

Metrom Stadium is a multi-use stadium in Brașov, Romania. It is used mostly for football matches and was the home ground of Metrom Brașov. Metrom Brașov was the football team of Metrom factory, Romania's main supplier for defense technique and services. Metrom played for 20 years at the level of the second division.

The football team was disbanded in 2002 and since then the stadium was renovated and his capacity was reduced considerably. Now, Metrom Stadium is used mostly for youth teams and women's football matches.
