= 1973 Balkans Cup =

Balkans football competition won by Lokomotiv Sofia

Tournament details
- Country: Balkans
- Teams: 6

Final positions
- Champions: (Bulgaria) Lokomotiv Sofia
- Runners-up: (Romania) ASA Târgu Mureș

Tournament statistics
- Matches played: 14
- Goals scored: 36 (2.57 per match)

The 1973 Balkans Cup was an edition of the Balkans Cup, a football competition for representative clubs from the Balkan states. It was contested by 6 teams and Lokomotiv Sofia won the trophy.

== Group Stage ==
=== Group A ===
Pos	Team	Pld	W	D	L	GF	GA	GR	Pts	Qualification
1	(Romania) ASA Târgu Mureș (A)	4	2	0	2	8	4	2.000	4	Advances to finals
2	(Albania) Labinoti Elbasani	4	2	0	2	4	6	0.667	4	
3	(Socialist Federal Republic of Yugoslavia) Sutjeska Nikšić	4	2	0	2	2	4	0.500	4	

Source: rsssf.com
Rules for classification: 1) points; 2) goal average; 3) number of goals scored
(A) Advance to a further round
7 March 1973

Labinoti Elbasani (Albania)	1–0	(Socialist Federal Republic of Yugoslavia) Sutjeska Nikšić

Ruzhdi Bizhuta, Elbasan

21 March 1973

Sutjeska Nikšić (Socialist Federal Republic of Yugoslavia)	1–0	(Romania) ASA Târgu Mureș

Gradski, Nikšić

11 April 1973

ASA Târgu Mureș (Romania)	5–1	(Albania) Labinoti Elbasani

ASA, Târgu Mureș

25 April 1973

Sutjeska Nikšić (Socialist Federal Republic of Yugoslavia)	1–0	(Albania) Labinoti Elbasani

Gradski, Nikšić

23 May 1973

ASA Târgu Mureș (Romania)	3–0	(Socialist Federal Republic of Yugoslavia) Sutjeska Nikšić

ASA, Târgu Mureș

30 May 1973

Labinoti Elbasani (Albania)	2–0	(Romania) ASA Târgu Mureș

Ruzhdi Bizhuta, Elbasan

=== Group B ===
Pos	Team	Pld	W	D	L	GF	GA	GR	Pts	Qualification
1	(Bulgaria) Lokomotiv Sofia (A)	4	3	1	0	8	1	8.000	7	Advances to finals
2	(Turkey) Beşiktaş	4	1	1	2	5	11	0.455	3	
3	(Greece) Aris	4	1	0	3	5	6	0.833	2	

Source: rsssf.com
Rules for classification: 1) points; 2) goal average; 3) number of goals scored
(A) Advance to a further round
7 March 1973

Aris (Greece)	4–2	(Turkey) Beşiktaş
Kokkoris 41'; Spyridon 50', 80'; Alexiadis 53'		Albal 31'; Acuner 74'

Kleanthis Vikelidis, Thessaloniki

21 March 1973

Beşiktaş (Turkey)	1–6	(Bulgaria) Lokomotiv Sofia
Acuner 65' (pen.)		Sokolov 14', 77'; Mihaylov 16', 21', 75'; Borisov 82'

İnönü, Istanbul

11 April 1973

Lokomotiv Sofia (Bulgaria)	1–0	(Greece) Aris

Lokomotiv, Sofia

25 April 1973

Beşiktaş (Turkey)	2–1	(Greece) Aris
Kalkavan 26'; Albal 30'		Alexiadis 66'

İnönü, Istanbul

23 May 1973

Aris (Greece)	0–1	(Bulgaria) Lokomotiv Sofia

Kleanthis Vikelidis, Thessaloniki

30 May 1973

Lokomotiv Sofia (Bulgaria)	0–0	(Turkey) Beşiktaş

Lokomotiv, Sofia

== Finals ==
Team 1	Agg.	Team 2	1st leg	2nd leg
ASA Târgu Mureș (Romania)	1–3	(Bulgaria) Lokomotiv Sofia	1–1	0–2

=== First leg ===
19 September 1973

ASA Târgu Mureș (Romania)	1–1	(Bulgaria) Lokomotiv Sofia

ASA, Târgu Mureș

=== Second leg ===
3 October 1973

Lokomotiv Sofia (Bulgaria)	2–0	(Romania) ASA Târgu Mureș
Mihaylov 48', 78'

Vasil Levski, Sofia
Attendance: 15,000

Lokomotiv Sofia won 3–1 on aggregate.
