= Tiberiu Bone =

Romanian footballer

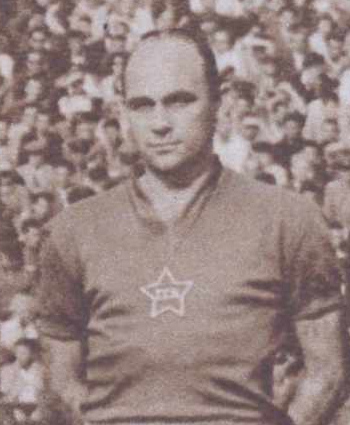

Personal information
- Date of birth: 13 April 1929
- Place of birth: Oradea, Romania
- Date of death: 22 March 1983 (aged 53)
- Height: 1.76 m (5 ft 9 in)
- Position: Midfielder

Youth career
- 1940–1943: Stăruința Oradea
- 1943–1946: CA Oradea

Senior career*
Years	Team	Apps	(Gls)
1946–1950	Jiul Petroşani	79	(3)
1951–1962	Steaua București	195	(8)
Total		274	(11)

International career
	Romania B	1	(0)
1951–1961	Romania	12	(0)

Managerial career
- 1962–1964: Steaua București (youth)
- 1964–1969: ASA Târgu Mureș
- 1970–1973: ASA Târgu Mureș
- 1973–1974: Textila Odorheiu Secuiesc
- 1974–1981: ASA Târgu Mureș
- * Club domestic league appearances and goals

Tiberiu Bone (13 April 1929 – 22 March 1983) was a Romanian footballer and coach, who played as a midfielder, most notably for Steaua București. He won 12 caps for Romania between 1951 and 1961. He was also part of Romania's squad for the 1952 Summer Olympics, but he did not play in any matches.

== Honours ==
=== Club ===
Steaua București

- Divizia A (6): 1951, 1952, 1953, 1956, 1960, 1961
- Cupa României (4): 1950, 1951, 1952, 1955
