= ASA Târgu Mureș (1962) =

Romanian football club

- Full name: Asociația Fotbal Club ASA Târgu Mureș
- Nicknames: Roș-albaștrii (The Red-Blues); Mureșenii (The Mureș Men); Lanterna roșie (The Red Lantern); Militarii (the Army Men)
- Short name: ASA
- Founded: 1962; 64 years ago (as Asociația Sportivă Armata Târgu Mureș); 2021; 5 years ago (refounded)
- Ground: Trans-Sil
- Capacity: 8,200
- Owner: Târgu Mureș Municipality
- Chairman: Gabriel Tamaș
- Head coach: Mihai Iosif
- League: Liga II
- 2025–26: Liga II, 7th of 22
- Website: https://asatargumures.com/
Home colours	Away colours

Asociația Fotbal Club ASA Târgu Mureș , commonly known as ASA Târgu Mureș, Târgu Mureș or simply ASA, is a Romanian professional football club based in Târgu Mureș, Mureș County, that competes in the Liga II.

Financially supported in the past by the Ministry of National Defence, ASA was considered privileged under the communist regime and functioned as an unofficial satellite club of CSA Steaua București. The club rose rapidly and became one of the most notable teams in the country. However, following the Romanian Revolution, "the Army Men" declined and eventually went bankrupt in 2005.

Between 2008 and 2018, the local authorities backed FCM Târgu Mureș, a club later renamed ASA 2013 Târgu Mureș. However, this new entity neither inherited nor acquired the official records of the original club and eventually disbanded achieving decent results, such as a Supercupa României.

In the summer of 2021, ASA was re-established under its original brand. Starting in the summer of 2025, the club marked its return to Romania's second division after a 23-year absence.The Romanian football federation approved that ASA will replace CS Unirea Ungheni in the 2025–26 Liga II season.

== History ==
=== Football in Târgu Mureș before 1962 ===
Organised football in Târgu Mureș dates back to the early 1920s. One of the city's first prominent clubs was SS Mureșul Târgu Mureș, founded in 1921 and named after the Mureș River. In 1923, Mureșul joined forces with the local railway workers' club, CFR Târgu Mureș, and competed as CFR Mureșul Târgu Mureș. The team won the regional championship in 1923–24 and reached the semi-finals of the 1923–24 Romanian national championship, defeating Șoimii Sibiu and Venus București before losing 9–0 to Chinezul Timișoara.

The railway association ended in 1924, when the club became CS Mureșul Târgu Mureș. It remained one of the stronger regional sides during the interwar years and returned to the national championship semi-finals in 1931-32, losing 8–2 to UD Reșița. Mureșul later competed in the newly established Divizia A during the 1933–34 season and spent the remainder of the decade in Divizia B. The club ceased competing in Romanian football in 1940, following the territorial changes brought about by the Second Vienna Award.

After the Second World War, a separate club was established in 1944 under the name ASM Târgu Mureș. It brought together players from several local teams and subsequently competed under a succession of names, including Dermagant, RATA, Locomotiva, Avântul, Recolta, Energia Recolta and finally CS Târgu Mureș. The club reached Divizia A in 1947 and spent ten seasons in the top flight. Its best league finishes were fourth place in 1948–49 and 1952.

CS Târgu Mureș was relegated from Divizia B at the end of the 1959–60 season and subsequently disappeared as a separate club. Meanwhile, the Mureșul name had returned through Voința Târgu Mureș, which became CS Mureșul in 1960. The reorganised Mureșul played in Divizia B until 1964, when it merged with the newly established army club ASA Târgu Mureș.

Although these clubs formed an important part of the city's football history, neither the original Mureșul nor the post-war CS Târgu Mureș was the same organisation as ASA, which was founded separately in 1962.

=== The original ASA (1962–2005) ===
Asociația Sportivă a Armatei Târgu Mureș was established in 1962 under the patronage of the Romanian Army. In September 1964, it merged with CS Mureșul Târgu Mureș, taking over the latter's place in Divizia B. The merger brought together the army-backed organisation and one of the city's established football teams.

ASA won promotion to Divizia A in 1967, beginning the most successful period in the club's history. With financial and institutional support from the Ministry of National Defence, the team became a regular presence in the top flight during the 1970s and 1980s. Its highest league finish came in 1974–75, when ASA finished second behind Dinamo București. The club also finished third in 1975–76 and fourth on two occasions, in 1971–72 and 1976–77.

ASA competed in the UEFA Cup for three consecutive seasons. It was eliminated in the first round by Dynamo Dresden in 1975–76, Dinamo Zagreb in 1976–77 and AEK Athens in 1977–78. The club also reached the final of the 1973 Balkans Cup, losing to Lokomotiv Sofia. These remained its most notable international performances.

Two players closely associated with this period were László Bölöni and Florea Ispir. Bölöni made 406 league appearances and scored 64 goals for ASA before joining Steaua București, with whom he won the European Cup in 1986. Ispir spent his entire Divizia A career at ASA, making 485 top-flight appearances. Both became established figures in the club's history.

ASA spent much of the 1980s in the first division, although relegations in 1986 and 1989 interrupted its run at the highest level. The team returned to Divizia A after winning its 1990–91 Divizia B series, but finished 17th in 1991–92 and was relegated again.

Following the Romanian Revolution, the club lost much of the institutional support that had sustained it during the previous decades. ASA remained in Divizia B throughout the 1990s but struggled to regain its former position. Relegation to Divizia C followed in 2002, and the club's financial problems became increasingly difficult to manage.

In 2005, after finishing second in its Divizia C series, ASA merged with Maris Târgu Mureș. The original club subsequently ceased to exist, ending more than four decades of activity under the ASA name.

=== FCM Târgu Mureș and ASA 2013 (2008–2018) ===
A new football project emerged in Târgu Mureș in 2008, three years after the disappearance of the original ASA. Following the reorganisation of local club Trans-Sil Târgu Mureș, the newly established FCM Târgu Mureș acquired the place in Liga II held by Unirea Sânnicolau Mare.

FCM finished third in its series in 2008–09 and won promotion to Liga I the following season. After returning to the second division in 2012, the club adopted the name ASA 2013 Târgu Mureș in 2013, reviving the name and colours associated with the former army club. Despite the historical references, ASA 2013 was a separate legal entity from the club founded in 1962.

The renamed club finished second in its 2013–14 Liga II series and returned to Liga I. In 2014–15, ASA challenged for the national title and finished as runners-up, losing the championship to Steaua București on the final matchday. It subsequently entered the 2015–16 UEFA Europa League, where it was eliminated by AS Saint-Étienne in the third qualifying round.

Financial difficulties brought an end to the club's brief period of success. ASA was relegated from Liga I in 2017 and entered bankruptcy proceedings, eventually ceasing activity in 2018.

Another attempt to maintain senior football in the city came through CSM Târgu Mureș, whose football section was established in 2018. That project lasted only one season and was discontinued in 2019.

=== Re-establishment of ASA (2021–2025) ===
The ASA name returned to senior football in 2021, when Asociația Fotbal Club ASA Târgu Mureș was established as a private organisation. The new club adopted the historic identity associated with ASA and entered the Mureș County leagues. It was distinct from both the original army club and ASA 2013 Târgu Mureș.

ASA spent its first seasons in the county competitions, finishing third in 2021–22, second in 2022–23 and fourth in 2023–24.

In 2024–25, the club won its series in Liga IV Mureș and qualified for the county promotion play-off. ASA subsequently became the county's representative in the promotion play-off for Liga III, facing CSM Săcele. Although it failed to secure promotion on the field, the club would move into a national competition through a separate arrangement during the following summer.

=== Return to Liga II (2025–present) ===
In the summer of 2025, ASA reached an agreement with Unirea Ungheni concerning the transfer of the latter's sporting activity and competition rights. On 18 July, the Executive Committee of the Romanian Football Federation approved the transfer from the publicly owned CS Unirea Ungheni 2018 to the privately constituted AFC ASA Târgu Mureș, subject to a condition allowing the decision to be reversed if the federation's approval was annulled by the competent judicial bodies.

The arrangement enabled ASA to enter Liga II in 2025–26 directly, despite having played in the fourth tier the previous season. It was an administrative transfer of sporting activity and participation rights rather than promotion earned through the league system.

ASA made a strong start to the 2025–26 campaign and remained among the contenders for a place in the promotion play-off. The team entered the winter break in fifth place but dropped out of the top six during the final rounds of the regular season. A goalless draw away to Sepsi OSK on the final matchday left ASA with 37 points, two behind the last play-off qualifiers. It finished seventh in the regular-season standings and was placed in Play-out Group A.

ASA retained its second-division place during the play-out, recording wins against Câmpulung Muscel, Politehnica Iași, Ceahlăul Piatra Neamț and CS Dinamo București.

The club is competing in the 2026–27 Liga II season, having retained its place in the second division following the previous campaign.

=== Chronology of names ===
The following names refer to the original ASA organisation and the modern club using the ASA identity. The latter was established separately and does not represent an uninterrupted legal continuation of the 1962 club.

Name	Period
Original club
Asociația Sportivă a Armatei Târgu Mureș	1962–1964
ASA Mureșul Târgu Mureș	1964–1969
ASA Târgu Mureș	1969–1990
ASA Electromureș Târgu Mureș	1990–1992
ASA Târgu Mureș	1992–2005
New club
AFC ASA Târgu Mureș	2021–present

== Grounds ==
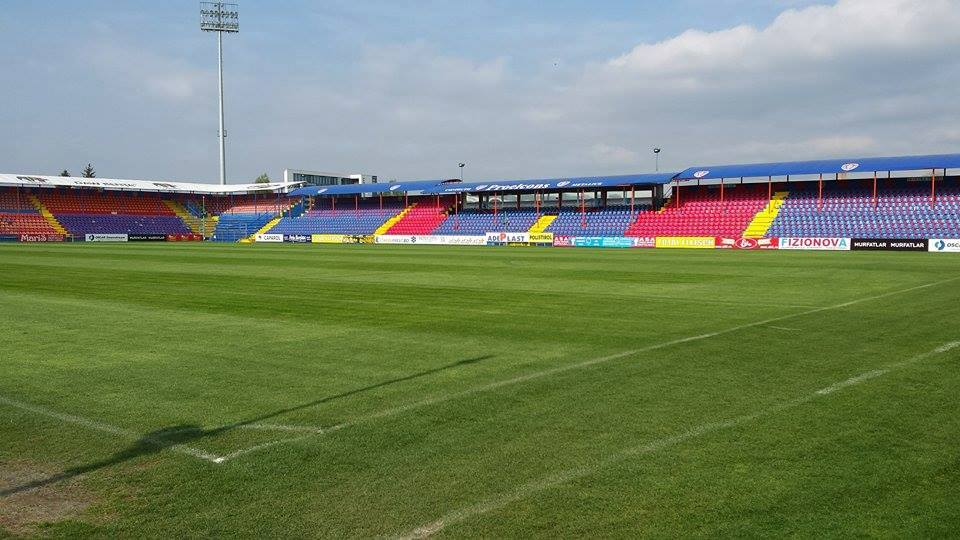
Trans-Sil Stadium

Ladislau Bölöni Stadium, with a capacity of 15,000 people, was the original home ground of ASA Târgu Mureș from its establishment in 1962 until 2004. In its final season of existence, the club moved to Ungheni for home matches due to the advanced state of degradation of the Ladislau Bölöni Stadium.

Since the re-founding of the football team in 2021, the "Red and Blues" have played their home matches at the nearby Trans-Sil Stadium, which has a capacity of 8,200 spectators, all seated.

== Honours ==
=== Domestic ===
- Liga I / Divizia A
  - Runners-up (1): 1974–75
- Liga II / Divizia B
  - Winners (4): 1966–67, 1970–71, 1986–87, 1990–91
- Liga III / Divizia C
  - Runners-up (1): 2004–05

Liga IV – Mureș County

  - Winners (1): 2024–25
  - Runners-up (1): 2022–23

=== Continental ===
- Balkans Cup
  - Runners-up (1): 1973

== ASA Târgu Mureș in Europe ==
Season	Competition	Round	Club	Home	Away	Aggregate
1975–76	UEFA Cup	FR	(East Germany) Dynamo Dresden	2–2	1–4	3–6
1976–77	UEFA Cup	FR	(Croatia) Dinamo Zagreb	0–1	0–3	0–4
1977–78	UEFA Cup	FR	(Greece) AEK Athens	1–0	0–3	1–3

Competition	S	P	W	D	L	GF	GA	GD
UEFA Europa League / UEFA Cup	3	6	1	1	4	4	13	– 9
Total	3	6	1	1	4	4	13	– 9

== Players ==
=== First-team squad ===
As of 8 October 2026

Note: Flags indicate national team as defined under FIFA eligibility rules; some limited exceptions apply. Players may hold more than one non-FIFA nationality.

No.	Pos.	Nation	Player
1	GK	ROU	Robert Geantă (Vice-captain)
2	DF	ROU	Cosmin Achim
5	DF	ROU	Adrian Horșia
6	DF	ROU	Adrian Iancu (on loan from Concordia Chiajna)
7	FW	GEQ	Óscar Siafá
8	MF	ROU	Ciprian Biceanu (3rd captain)
9	FW	MLI	Moussa Samaké (on loan from CFR Cluj)
10	MF	BRA	Jair
11	MF	ROU	Denis Fărăgău
12	GK	ROU	Daniel Barabás (on loan from ACS Târgu Mureș)
13	DF	ROU	Mihai Dohatcă
15	DF	ROU	Gabriel Avram
16	DF	ROU	Răzvan Călugăr
17	MF	ROU	Cosmin Bîrnoi
19	FW	ROU	Ianis Fărăgău (on loan from Viitorul Cluj)

No.	Pos.	Nation	Player
20	MF	CMR	Serges Ekollo
21	FW	HUN	Bence Kocsis
22	DF	GRE	Okan Chatziterzoglou
23	DF	ROU	Gabriel Dumitru
24	MF	ROU	Marius Cioiu
28	DF	ROU	Luca Galdea (on loan from FCSB)
29	FW	ROU	Raul Haiduc
30	DF	ROU	Zsombor Demeter
55	MF	ROU	Eric Vînău
77	MF	ROU	Rareș Trif
80	MF	ROU	Andrei Moga
90	FW	ROU	Alexandru Capac
93	GK	ROU	Florin Iacob (Captain)
98	DF	ROU	Tudor Oltean

=== Out on loan ===
Note: Flags indicate national team as defined under FIFA eligibility rules; some limited exceptions apply. Players may hold more than one non-FIFA nationality.

No.	Pos.	Nation	Player
—	MF	ROU	David Ercea (at Kinder Târgu Mureș until 30 June 2027)

== Club officials ==
=== Board of directors ===
Role	Name
Owner	(Romania) Târgu Mureș Municipality
President	(Romania) Liviu Muruțan
Executive Director	(Romania) Gabriel Tamaș
Team Manager	(Romania) Sorin Dumbrăvean
Press Officer	(Romania) Cătălin Cîmpian

=== Technical staff ===
Role	Name
Head coach	(Romania) Mihai Iosif
Assistant coach	(Romania) Paul Ceușan
Goalkeeping coach	vacant
Fitness coach	(Romania) Mircea Șcheau
Video analyst	(Romania) Emil Ștef
Club Doctor	(Romania) Luchian Bățagă
Physiotherapist	(Romania) Denis Enache
Kit man	(Romania) Szilveszter Herczeg

== League and Cup History ==
Season	Tier	Division	Place	Notes	Cupa României
2026–27	2	Liga II	TBD		Play-off round
2025–26	2	Liga II	7th		
2024–25	4	Liga IV (MS)	1st (C)	Promoted (Note: Took Unirea Ungheni’s place in Liga II following license transfer.)	
2023–24	4	Liga IV (MS)	4th		
2022–23	4	Liga IV (MS)	2nd		
2021–22	4	Liga IV (MS)	3rd		
2005–21	Not active				
2004–05	3	Divizia C (VIII)	2nd	Merged with Maris	
2003–04	3	Divizia C (IX)	8th		
2002–03	3	Divizia C (VII)	14th	Spared from (R)	
2001–02	2	Divizia B (II)	14th	Relegated	Round of 32
2000–01	2	Divizia B (II)	12th		
1999–00	2	Divizia B (II)	13th		
1998–99	2	Divizia B (II)	7th		Round of 32
1997–98	2	Divizia B (II)	4th		
1996–97	2	Divizia B (II)	8th		Round of 32
1995–96	2	Divizia B (II)	3rd		Round of 16
1994–95	2	Divizia B (II)	5th		Round of 32
1993–94	2	Divizia B (I)	5th		
1992–93	2	Divizia B (I)	5th		
1991–92	1	Divizia A	17th	Relegated	Round of 16
1990–91	2	Divizia B (III)	1st (C)	Promoted	
1989–90	2	Divizia B (III)	7th		
1988–89	1	Divizia A	18th	Relegated	Round of 32

Season	Tier	Division	Place	Notes	Cupa României
1987–88	1	Divizia A	11th		Round of 32
1986–87	2	Divizia B (II)	1st (C)	Promoted	
1985–86	1	Divizia A	17th	Relegated	Round of 32
1984–85	1	Divizia A	6th		Round of 32
1983–84	1	Divizia A	14th		Quarter-finals
1982–83	1	Divizia A	8th		Round of 32
1981–82	1	Divizia A	15th		Round of 32
1980–81	1	Divizia A	13th		Round of 32
1979–80	1	Divizia A	15th		Round of 16
1978–79	1	Divizia A	9th		Round of 32
1977–78	1	Divizia A	12th		Round of 32
1976–77	1	Divizia A	4th		Round of 32
1975–76	1	Divizia A	3rd		Quarter-finals
1974–75	1	Divizia A	2nd		Semi-finals
1973–74	1	Divizia A	12th		Quarter-finals
1972–73	1	Divizia A	12th		Round of 32
1971–72	1	Divizia A	4th		Quarter-finals
1970–71	2	Divizia B (I)	1st (C)	Promoted	
1969–70	1	Divizia A	16th	Relegated	Round of 16
1968–69	1	Divizia A	14th		Round of 16
1967–68	1	Divizia A	12th		Round of 16
1965–66	2	Divizia B (II)	1st (C)	Promoted	
1964–65	2	Divizia B (II)	4th		
1963–64	2	Divizia B (II)	9th		Round of 32

== Notable former players ==
The footballers enlisted below have had international cap(s) for their respective countries at junior and/or senior level and/or significant caps for ASA Târgu Mureș.

- (Romania) Imre Bíró
- (Romania) Ladislau Bölöni
- (Romania) Gyuri Both
- (Romania) Horațiu Cioloboc
- (Romania) George Ciorceri
- (Romania) Levente Czakó
- (Romania) Árpád Fazekas
- (Romania) Dezső Gáll
- (Romania) Iuliu Hajnal
- (Romania) Florea Ispir
- (Romania) Ovidiu Maier
- (Romania) Attila Kanyaró
- (Romania) Madocsa Kiss
- (Romania) Ion Mureșan
- (Romania) Zoltán Nágel
- (Romania) Nicolae Nagy
- (Romania) Carol Onuțan
- (Romania) Vasile Pîslaru
- (Romania) Gabriel Raksi
- (Romania) Csaba Solyom
- (Romania) László Szöllősi
- (Romania) Sándor Varró
- (Romania) Petre Varodi
- (Romania) Eugen Vodă
- (Romania) Dumitru Unchiașu
- (Romania) Vasile Zavoda

== Notable former managers ==
- (Romania) Tiberiu Bone
- (Romania) Ștefan Coidum
- (Romania) George Ciorceri
- (Romania) Cornel Dinu
- (Romania) Bujor Hălmăgeanu
- (Romania) Florea Ispir
