= 1986–87 Divizia B =

Divizia B
- Season: 1986–87
- Promoted: CSM Suceava; ASA Târgu Mureș; Politehnica Timișoara
- Relegated: Aripile Victoria Bacău; ROVA Roșiori; Aurul Brad; Minerul Gura Humorului; Carpați Mârșa; Mureșul Deva; Dunărea CSU Galați; Automatica București; Steaua CFR Cluj; Poiana Câmpina; IMASA Sfântu Gheorghe; Minerul Cavnic
- Top goalscorer: Adrian Petrache (Series I, 24 goals); Nicolae Ghiță (Series II, 16 goals); Adrian Florea (Series III, 24 goals)

The 1986–87 Divizia B was the 47th season of the second tier of the Romanian football league system.

The format has been maintained to three series, each of them having 18 teams. At the end of the season the winners of the series promoted to Divizia A and the last four places from each series relegated to Divizia C.

== Team changes ==
=== To Divizia B ===
Promoted from Divizia C

- Minerul Gura Humorului
- Unirea Dinamo Focșani
- FEPA 74 Bârlad
- Unirea Slobozia
- Autobuzul București
- ROVA Roșiori
- Gloria Pandurii Târgu Jiu
- Minerul Paroșeni
- Steaua CFR Cluj
- Unio Satu Mare
- Inter Sibiu
- Poiana Câmpina

Relegated from Divizia A

- Politehnica Timișoara
- ASA Târgu Mureș
- Bihor Oradea

=== From Divizia B ===
Relegated to Divizia C

- Metalul Plopeni
- Muscelul Câmpulung
- CFR Timișoara
- Dunărea Călărași
- Avântul Reghin
- Unirea Alba Iulia
- Chimia Fălticeni
- Șoimii IPA Sibiu
- Înfrățirea Oradea
- Minerul Vatra Dornei
- ICSIM București
- Minerul Lupeni

Promoted to Divizia A

- Oțelul Galați
- Flacăra Moreni
- Jiul Petroșani

=== Renamed teams ===
Aripile Bacău was renamed as Aripile Victoria Bacău.

Delta Tulcea was renamed as Delta Dinamo Tulcea.

== League tables ==
=== Serie I ===
Pos	Team	Pld	W	D	L	GF	GA	GD	Pts	Promotion or relegation
1	CSM Suceava (C, P)	34	21	7	6	62	22	+40	49	Promotion to Divizia A
2	Politehnica Iași	34	20	6	8	50	22	+28	46	
3	Progresul Brăila	34	21	1	12	75	42	+33	43	
4	FC Constanța	34	19	3	12	64	29	+35	41	
5	Steaua Mizil	34	17	4	13	54	48	+6	38	
6	Unirea Dinamo Focșani	34	16	4	14	49	43	+6	36	
7	Unirea Slobozia	34	15	6	13	36	40	−4	36	
8	Ceahlăul Piatra Neamț	34	14	7	13	49	52	−3	35	
9	CFR Pașcani	34	14	6	14	48	39	+9	34	
10	Olimpia Râmnicu Sărat	34	14	6	14	41	44	−3	34	
11	Prahova CSU Ploiești	34	15	3	16	44	42	+2	33	
12	Delta Dinamo Tulcea	34	15	3	16	44	51	−7	33	
13	FEPA 74 Bârlad	34	15	3	16	37	47	−10	33	
14	CS Botoșani	34	13	6	15	35	52	−17	32	
15	Aripile Victoria Bacău (R)	34	13	5	16	48	47	+1	31	Relegation to Divizia C
16	Minerul Gura Humorului (R)	34	9	4	21	39	76	−37	22	Relegation to Divizia C
17	Dunărea CSU Galați (R)	34	9	2	23	37	56	−19	20	Relegation to Divizia C
18	Poiana Câmpina (R)	34	6	4	24	21	81	−60	16	Relegation to Divizia C

Source: romaniansoccer.ro (in Romanian)
Rules for classification: 1) Points; 2) Goal difference; 3) Goals scored; 4) Head-to-head points; 5) Head-to-head goal difference; 6) Head-to-head goals scored; 7) Head-to-head away goals scored.
(C) Champions; (P) Promoted; (R) Relegated

=== Top scorers ===
The Series I top scorers:

24 goals

- (Romania) Adrian Petrache (Progresul Brăila)

20 goals

- (Romania) Cornel Sfrijan (CSM Suceava)

19 goals

- (Romania) Ionel Drăgoi (Progresul Brăila)

17 goals

- (Romania) Lucian Amarghioalei (Ceahlăul Piatra Neamț)
- (Romania) Nelu Constantin (Unirea Slobozia)

16 goals

- (Romania) Gheorghe Iamandi (Delta Dinamo Tulcea)

=== Serie II ===
Pos	Team	Pld	W	D	L	GF	GA	GD	Pts	Promotion or relegation
1	ASA Târgu Mureș (C, P)	34	19	9	6	70	31	+39	47	Promotion to Divizia A
2	Progresul Vulcan București	34	18	7	9	54	33	+21	43	
3	Electroputere Craiova	34	16	7	11	65	35	+30	39	
4	ICIM Brașov	34	14	8	12	40	37	+3	36	
5	CS Târgoviște	34	15	6	13	46	45	+1	36	
6	Drobeta-Turnu Severin	34	14	7	13	47	42	+5	35	
7	Gaz Metan Mediaș	34	14	7	13	36	32	+4	35	
8	Chimica Târnăveni	34	16	2	16	54	53	+1	34	
9	Tractorul Brașov	34	12	9	13	46	44	+2	33	
10	Inter Sibiu	34	14	5	15	44	44	0	33	
11	Sportul Muncitoresc Slatina	34	12	9	13	41	41	0	33	
12	Autobuzul București	34	12	9	13	41	42	−1	33	
13	Gloria Pandurii Târgu Jiu	34	15	3	16	40	58	−18	33	
14	Mecanică Fină Steaua București	34	13	6	15	49	53	−4	32	
15	ROVA Roșiori (R)	34	13	5	16	34	50	−16	31	Relegation to Divizia C
16	Carpați Mârșa (R)	34	11	7	16	46	53	−7	29	Relegation to Divizia C
17	Automatica București (R)	34	11	5	18	37	62	−25	27	Relegation to Divizia C
18	IMASA Sfântu Gheorghe (R)	34	8	7	19	29	64	−35	23	Relegation to Divizia C

Source: romaniansoccer.ro (in Romanian)
Rules for classification: 1) Points; 2) Goal difference; 3) Goals scored; 4) Head-to-head points; 5) Head-to-head goal difference; 6) Head-to-head goals scored; 7) Head-to-head away goals scored.
(C) Champions; (P) Promoted; (R) Relegated

=== Top scorers ===
The Series II top scorers:

16 goals

- (Romania) Nicolae Ghiță (Electroputere Craiova)

15 goals

- (Romania) Mircea Muntean (ASA Târgu Mureș)

13 goals

- (Romania) Filică Voiculeț (Carpați Mârșa)
- (Romania) Valentin Răduț (Sportul Muncitoresc Slatina)
- (Romania) Petre Grosu (Automatica București)

12 goals

- (Romania) Cezar Zamfir (Progresul Vulcan București)
- (Romania) Gheorghe Ciurea (Electroputere Craiova)
- (Romania) Radu Dragne (Mecanică Fină Steaua București)

=== Serie III ===
Pos	Team	Pld	W	D	L	GF	GA	GD	Pts	Promotion or relegation
1	Politehnica Timișoara (C, P)	34	19	10	5	80	40	+40	48	Promotion to Divizia A
2	Maramureș Baia Mare	34	19	8	7	69	22	+47	46	
3	Bihor Oradea (Note: Bihor Oradea were deducted 3 points.)	34	20	9	5	55	15	+40	46	
4	Gloria Bistrița	34	16	5	13	53	46	+7	37	
5	CSM Reșița	34	15	6	13	44	36	+8	36	
6	Minerul Paroșeni	34	14	8	12	45	42	+3	36	
7	Unio Satu Mare	34	15	5	14	42	44	−2	35	
8	Armătura Zalău	34	14	6	14	46	48	−2	34	
9	Strungul Arad	34	13	7	14	41	47	−6	33	
10	UTA Arad	34	14	5	15	43	52	−9	33	
11	Olimpia Satu Mare	34	12	9	13	41	51	−10	33	
12	CIL Sighetu Marmației	34	13	6	15	48	54	−6	32	
13	Metalul Bocșa	34	14	4	16	46	54	−8	32	
14	Mecanica Orăștie	34	14	3	17	55	58	−3	31	
15	Aurul Brad (R)	34	11	7	16	46	59	−13	29	Relegation to Divizia C
16	Mureșul Deva (R)	34	11	3	20	30	73	−43	25	Relegation to Divizia C
17	Steaua CFR Cluj (R)	34	7	8	19	35	56	−21	22	Relegation to Divizia C
18	Minerul Cavnic (R)	34	9	3	22	42	64	−22	21	Relegation to Divizia C

Source: romaniansoccer.ro (in Romanian)
Rules for classification: 1) Points; 2) Goal difference; 3) Goals scored; 4) Head-to-head points; 5) Head-to-head goal difference; 6) Head-to-head goals scored; 7) Head-to-head away goals scored.
(C) Champions; (P) Promoted; (R) Relegated

=== Top scorers ===
The Series III top scorers:

24 goals

- (Romania) Adrian Florea (Gloria Bistrița)

21 goals

- (Romania) Mircea Bolba (Politehnica Timișoara)

17 goals

- (Romania) Ioan Vesa (Mecanica Orăștie)
- (Romania) Dinu Moldovan (Maramureș Baia Mare)

16 goals

- (Romania) Gheorghe Tulba (Maramureș Baia Mare)

14 goals

- (Romania) Octavian Roșca (Metalul Bocșa)
- (Romania) Gheorghe Laiș (Maramureș Baia Mare)

== See also ==
- 1986–87 Divizia A
- 1986–87 Divizia C
- 1986–87 County Championship
- 1986–87 Cupa României
