= Suplacu de Barcău =

Suplacu de Barcău Berettyószéplak
- Commune
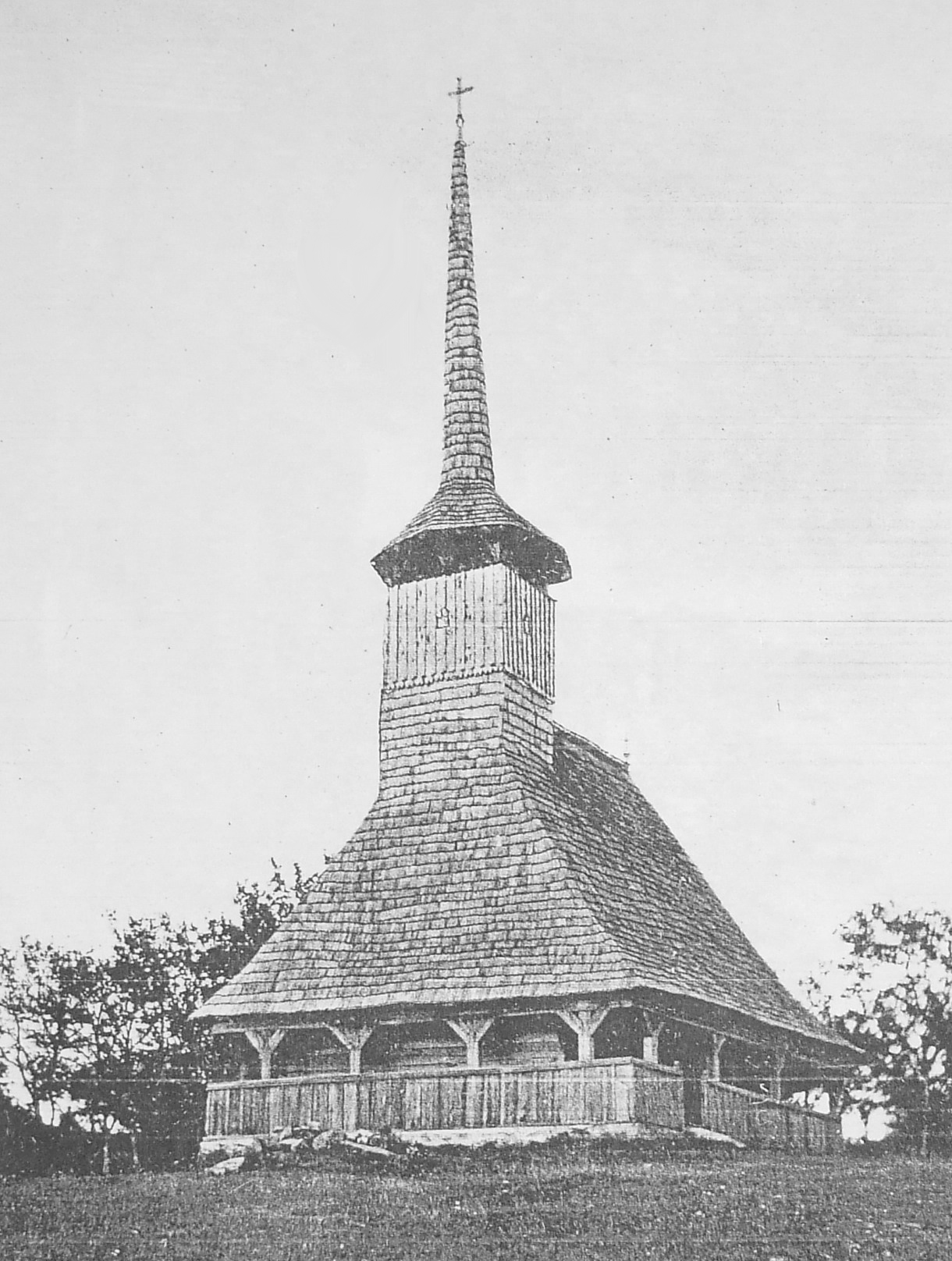
- Wooden church in Borumlaca

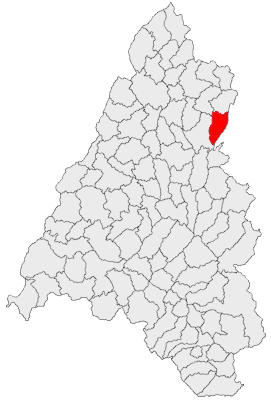
- Location in Bihor County

- Location in Romania
- Coordinates: 47°15′N 22°32′E
- Country: Romania
- County: Bihor

Government
  - Mayor (2020–2024): Nicolae Tivadar (PNL)
- Area: 44.48 km^{2} (17.17 sq mi)
- Elevation: 169 m (554 ft)
- Population (2021-12-01): 3,813
  - Density: 85.72/km^{2} (222.0/sq mi)
- Time zone: UTC+02:00 (EET)
  - Summer (DST): UTC+03:00 (EEST)
- Postal code: 417535
- Area code: +(40) 259
- Vehicle reg.: BH
- Website: www.suplacudebarcau.ro

Suplacu de Barcău (Hungarian: Berettyószéplak, Slovak: Siplak) is a commune in Bihor County, Crișana, Romania with a population of 3,813 as of 2021. It is composed of six villages: Borumlaca (Baromlak), Dolea (Dólyapuszta), Foglaș (Fogás; Fogaš), Suplacu de Barcău, Valea Cerului (Cserpatak), and Vâlcelele (Blágarét).

== History ==
The two oldest villages in the commune, Suplacu de Barcău and Borumlaca, were partly depopulated between 1686 and 1692, as a result of the Great Turkish War; the previous inhabitants began to return once hostilities ceased. Numerous families of Slovak colonists arrived in the late 18th century, leading to the appearance of two other villages, Vâlcelele and Valea Cerului. The final two, Dolea and Foglaș, date to 1905 and 1916, respectively.

== Natives ==
- Iuliu Hajnal (born 1951), footballer

== See also ==
- Suplacu de Barcău Viaduct
