= 1970–71 Divizia B =

Divizia B
- Season: 1970–71
- Country: Romania
- Teams: 32 (2x16)
- Promoted: ASA Târgu Mureș; Crișul Oradea
- Relegated: Metrom Brașov; UM Timișoara; Flacăra Moreni; Vagonul Arad

The 1970–71 Divizia B was the 31st season of the second tier of the Romanian football league system.

The format has been maintained to two series, each of them having 16 teams. At the end of the season the winners of the series promoted to Divizia A and the last two places from each series relegated to Divizia C.

== Team changes ==
=== To Divizia B ===
Promoted from Divizia C

- ȘN Oltenița
- UM Timișoara
- CFR Pașcani
- Gloria Bistrița

Relegated from Divizia A

- Crișul Oradea
- ASA Târgu Mureș

=== From Divizia B ===
Relegated to Divizia C

- Chimia Suceava
- Chimia Râmnicu Vâlcea
- Gloria Bârlad
- Metalul Turnu Severin

Promoted to Divizia A

- Progresul București
- CFR Timișoara

=== Renamed teams ===
Metalul Hunedoara was renamed as Corvinul Hunedoara.

=== Other teams ===
Oțelul Galați gave away its place in the Divizia B to FC Galați, a newly formed team.

== League tables ==
=== Serie I ===
Pos	Team	Pld	W	D	L	GF	GA	GD	Pts	Promotion or relegation
1	ASA Târgu Mureș (C, P)	30	18	6	6	66	27	+39	42	Promotion to Divizia A
2	Sportul Studențesc	30	18	5	7	42	27	+15	41	
3	Metalul Târgoviște	30	16	2	12	37	39	−2	34	
4	Progresul Brăila	30	14	5	11	32	26	+6	33	
5	FC Galați	30	14	5	11	37	33	+4	33	
6	Dunărea Giurgiu	30	13	6	11	29	31	−2	32	
7	Metalul București	30	11	9	10	33	22	+11	31	
8	Ceahlăul Piatra Neamț	30	12	6	12	31	35	−4	30	
9	Portul Constanța	30	11	7	12	23	29	−6	29	
10	CFR Pașcani	30	11	6	13	39	41	−2	28	
11	ȘN Oltenița	30	11	6	13	28	39	−11	28	
12	Știința Bacău	30	10	7	13	37	34	+3	27	
13	Poiana Câmpina	30	11	5	14	35	34	+1	27	
14	Politehnica Galați	30	12	3	15	32	33	−1	27	
15	Metrom Brașov (R)	30	9	9	12	23	30	−7	27	Relegation to Divizia C
16	Flacăra Moreni (R)	30	1	9	20	20	64	−44	11	Relegation to Divizia C

Source: romaniansoccer.ro
Rules for classification: 1) Points 2) Goal difference; 3) Goals scored.
(C) Champions; (P) Promoted; (R) Relegated

=== Serie II ===
Pos	Team	Pld	W	D	L	GF	GA	GD	Pts	Promotion or relegation
1	Crișul Oradea (C, P)	30	18	8	4	46	21	+25	44	Promotion to Divizia A
2	Politehnica Timișoara	30	16	10	4	48	22	+26	42	
3	CSM Sibiu	30	14	5	11	48	37	+11	33	
4	Corvinul Hunedoara	30	13	7	10	39	30	+9	33	
5	Minerul Anina	30	14	3	13	32	33	−1	31	
6	Olimpia Satu Mare	30	13	4	13	35	28	+7	30	
7	Metalurgistul Cugir	30	11	8	11	30	41	−11	30	
8	Olimpia Oradea	30	12	5	13	33	33	0	29	
9	CFR Arad	30	11	6	13	23	34	−11	28	
10	Minerul Baia Mare	30	12	3	15	44	36	+8	27	
11	Gloria Bistrița	30	10	7	13	29	38	−9	27	
12	Gaz Metan Mediaș	30	10	7	13	28	41	−13	27	
13	Electroputere Craiova	30	8	10	12	28	45	−17	26	
14	CSM Reșița	30	10	5	15	36	42	−6	25	
15	UM Timișoara (R)	30	7	10	13	26	33	−7	24	Relegation to Divizia C
16	Vagonul Arad (R)	30	9	6	15	28	39	−11	24	Relegation to Divizia C

Source: romaniansoccer.ro
Rules for classification: 1) Points 2) Goal difference; 3) Goals scored.
(C) Champions; (P) Promoted; (R) Relegated

== See also ==
- 1970–71 Divizia A
- 1970–71 Divizia C
- 1970–71 County Championship
- 1970–71 Cupa României
