= Romania national football team results (1960–1979) =

Win Draw Loss

This is a list of the Romania national football team results from 1960 to 1979.

== 1960 ==
1 May 1960 1960 Olympics Q	Bulgaria	2–1	Romania	Sofia, Bulgaria
	Yordanov 2'; Kovachev 20'	Report	Tătaru 66'	Stadium: Vasil Levski National Stadium; Attendance: 55,000; Referee: Petros Tzouvaraz (Greece)

22 May 1960 Euro 1960 Q	Romania	0–2	Czechoslovakia	Bucharest, Romania
		Report	Masopust 8'; Bubník 45'	Stadium: Stadionul 23 August; Attendance: 80,000; Referee: Dorogi Andor (Hungary)

29 May 1960 Euro 1960 Q	Czechoslovakia	3–0	Romania	Bratislava, Czechoslovakia
	Buberník 8', 16'; Bubník 18'	Report		Stadium: Tehelné pole Attendance: 45,000; Referee: Leif Gulliksen (Norway)

== 1961 ==
14 May 1961 Friendly	Turkey	0–1	Romania	Ankara, Turkey
		Report	Dridea 72'	Stadium: 19 Mayıs Stadı; Attendance: 25,969; Referee: Dimitar Rumenchev (Bulgaria)

8 October 1961 Friendly	Romania	4–0	Turkey	Bucharest, Romania
	Szeredai 13', 48'; Constantin 73', 74'	Report		Stadium: Stadionul 23 August; Attendance: 35,000; Referee: Raoul Righi (Italy)

== 1962 ==
30 September 1962 Friendly	Romania	4–0	Morocco	Bucharest, Romania
	Voinea 4', 84'; Ozon 13'; Szeredai 58'	Report		Stadium: Stadionul 23 August; Attendance: 45,000; Referee: Živko Bajić (Yugoslavia)

14 October 1962 Friendly	East Germany	3–2	Romania	Dresden, East Germany
	Wirth 6'; Schröter 47'; Nachtigall 65'	Report	Petru 52', 58'	Stadium: Heinz Steyer Stadion; Attendance: 30,000; Referee: Martin Macko (Czechoslovakia)

1 November 1962 Euro 1964 Q	Spain	6–0	Romania	Madrid, Spain
	Guillot 7', 20', 70'; Veloso 9'; Collar 17'; Nunweiller 81' (o.g.)	Report		Stadium: Estadio Santiago Bernabéu; Attendance: 51,700; Referee: Kevin Howley (England)

25 November 1962 Euro 1964 Q	Romania	3–1	Spain	Bucharest, Romania
	Tătaru 2'; Manolache 8'; Constantin 61'	Report	Veloso 66'	Stadium: Stadionul 23 August; Attendance: 72,762; Referee: Giorgos Pelomis (Greece)

23 December 1962 Friendly	Morocco	3–1	Romania	Casablanca, Morocco
	Mustafa 31'; Mohamed 34'; Abadenahan 44'	Report	Constantin 24' (pen.)	Stadium: Unknown; Attendance: 10,000; Referee: Daniel Zariquiegui Izco (Spain)

== 1963 ==
12 May 1963 Friendly	Romania	3–2	East Germany	Bucharest, Romania
	Pîrcălab 32'; Pavlovici 43'; Haidu 84'	(Repord)	Ducke 13'; Nöldner 23'	Stadium: Stadionul 23 August; Attendance: 40,000; Referee: Branislav Tešanić (Yugoslavia)

2 June 1963 Friendly	Poland	1–1	Romania	Chorzów, Poland
	Faber 88'	Report	Haidu 64'	Stadium: Stadion Śląski; Attendance: 40,000; Referee: Werner Bergmann (East Germany)

23 June 1963 1964 Olympics Q	Denmark	2–3	Romania	Copenhagen, Denmark
	Bruun 17'; Enoksen 59' (pen.)	Report	Constantin 5'; Manolache 52', 75'	Stadium: Københavns Idrætspark; Attendance: 34,000; Referee: Albert Guinnard (Switzerland)

9 October 1963 Friendly	Turkey	0–0	Romania	Ankara, Turkey
		Report		Stadium: 19 Mayıs Stadı; Attendance: 29,779; Referee: Yiannis Zogas (Greece)

27 October 1963 Friendly	Romania	2–1	Yugoslavia	Bucharest, Romania
	Ţîrcovnicu 17'; Haidu 33'	Report	Smajlović 6'	Stadium: Stadionul 23 August; Attendance: 30,000; Referee: Włodzimierz Storoniak (Poland)

3 November 1963 1964 Olympics Q	Romania	2–3	Denmark	Bucharest, Romania
	Petru 35', 80'	Report	Thorst 1', 9'; Bertelsen 17'	Stadium: Stadionul 23 August; Attendance: 60,000; Referee: Konstantin Zečević (Yugoslavia)

28 November 1963 1964 Olympics Q	Denmark	1–2 (a.e.t.)	Romania	Turin, Italy
	Thorst 84'	Report	Creiniceanu 36'; Sasu 117'	Stadium: Stadio Comunale; Attendance: 3,000; Referee: Giulio Campanati (Italy)

== 1964 ==
27 April 1964 Friendly	Romania	4–1	Yugoslavia	Bucharest, Romania
	Constantin 4' (pen.); Ţîrlea 9', 17'; Georgescu 52'	Report	Schmucker 20'	Stadium: Stadionul 23 August; Attendance: 15,000; Referee: Hatzinikolaou (Greece)

3 May 1964 1964 Olympics Q	Romania	2–1	Bulgaria	Bucharest, Romania
	Constantin 50', 84' (pen.)	Report	Kotkov 87'	Stadium: Stadionul 23 August; Attendance: 50,000; Referee: Michel Kitabdjian (France)

20 May 1964 Friendly	Hungary	0–0	Romania	Kecskemét, Hungary
		Report		Stadium: Széktói Stadion; Attendance: 12,000; Referee: György Müncz (Hungary)

31 May 1964 1964 Olympics Q	Bulgaria	0–1	Romania	Sofia, Bulgaria
		Report	Koszka 71'	Stadium: Vasil Levski National Stadium; Attendance: 50,000; Referee: Andries van Leeuwen (Netherlands)

17 June 1964 Friendly	Yugoslavia	1–2	Romania	Belgrad, Yugoslavia
	Takač 61'	Report	Georgescu 69'; Popescu 86'	Stadium: Stadion Jugoslovenska Narodna Armija; Attendance: 10,000; Referee: Soós Gábor (Hungary)

11 October 1964 1964 Olympics	Mexico	1–3	Romania	Saitama, Japan
	Fragoso 73'	Report	Creiniceanu 20'; Pîrcălab 35'; Ionescu 46'	Stadium: Omiya Football Field; Attendance: 10,000; Referee: Yozo Yokoyama (Japan)

13 October 1964 1964 Olympics	East Germany	1–1	Romania	Tokyo, Japan
	Frenzel 22'	Report	Pavlovici 27'	Stadium: Komazawa Olympic Park Stadium; Attendance: 30,000; Referee: Václav Korelus (Czechoslovakia)

15 October 1964 1964 Olympics	Iran	0–1	Romania	Saitama, Japan
		Report	Pavlovici 26'	Stadium: Omiya Football Field; Attendance: 18,000; Referee: Miguel Comesaña (Argentina)

18 October 1964 1964 Olympics	Hungary	2–0	Romania	Yokohama, Japan
	Csernai 2', 84' (pen.)	Report		Stadium: Mitsuzawa Stadium; Attendance: 25,000; Referee: Menahem Ashkenazi (Israel)

20 October 1964 1964 Olympics	Ghana	2–4	Romania	Kyoto, Japan
	Fynn 25', 44'	Report	Pavlovici 12', 19', 74'; Creiniceanu 41'	Stadium: Nishikyogoku Athletic Stadium; Attendance: 10,000; Referee: Greg da Silva (Malaysia)

22 October 1964 1964 Olympics	Romania	3–0	Yugoslavia	Osaka, Japan
	Pavlovici 50'; Pîrcălab 72'; Constantin 78'	Report		Stadium: Nagai Stadium; Attendance: 10,000; Referee: Zsolt István (Hungary)

== 1965 ==
2 May 1965 1966 WCQ	Romania	3–0	Turkey	Bucharest, Romania
	Georgescu 1'; Mateianu 72' (pen.); Creiniceanu 75'	Report		Stadium: Stadionul 23 August; Attendance: 31,129; Referee: Paul Schiller (Austria)

30 May 1965 1966 WCQ	Romania	1–0	Czechoslovakia	Bucharest, Romania
	Mateianu 34'	Report		Stadium: Stadionul 23 August; Attendance: 80,000; Referee: Fritz Köpcke (East Germany)

13 June 1965 1966 WCQ	Portugal	2–1	Romania	Oeiras, Portugal
	Eusébio 14', 39'	Report	Avram 73'	Stadium: Estádio Nacional do Jamor; Attendance: 45,646; Referee: Michel Kitabdjian (France)

19 September 1965 1966 WCQ	Czechoslovakia	3–1	Romania	Prague, Czechoslovakia
	Hălmăgeanu 3' (o.g.); Knebort 66'; Jokl 89'	Report	Coe 23'	Stadium: Stadion Československé Armády; Attendance: 10,000; Referee: Włodzimierz Storoniak (Poland)

23 October 1965 1966 WCQ	Turkey	2–1	Romania	Ankara, Turkey
	Zemzem 13'; Doğan 48'	Report	Georgescu 55'	Stadium: 19 Mayıs Stadı; Attendance: 27,364; Referee: Ramiz Pregja (Albania)

21 November 1965 1966 WCQ	Romania	2–0	Portugal	Bucharest, Romania
	Pîrcălab 1'; Badea 43'	Report		Stadium: Stadionul 23 August; Attendance: 50,500; Referee: Gottfried Dienst (Switzerland)

== 1966 ==
1 June 1966 Friendly	West Germany	1–0	Romania	Ludwigshafen am Rhein, West Germany
	Seeler 72'	Report		Stadium: Südweststadion; Attendance: 60,000; Referee: Franz Mayer (Austria)

19 June 1966 Friendly	Romania	1–0	Uruguay	Bucharest, Romania
	Iancu 33'	Report		Stadium: Stadionul 23 August; Attendance: 60,000; Referee: Alexandru Pîrvu (Romania)

3 July 1966 Friendly	Portugal	1–0	Romania	Porto, Portugal
	Torres 1'	Report		Stadium: Estádio do Futebol Clube do Porto; Attendance: 25,000; Referee: Anton Bucheli (Switzerland)

21 September 1966 Friendly	East Germany	2–0	Romania	Gera, East Germany
	Nöldner 62'; Frenzel 89'	Report		Stadium: Stadion der Freundschaft; Attendance: 20,000; Referee: Eric Jennings (England)

2 November 1966 Euro 1968 Q	Romania	4–2	Switzerland	Bucharest, Romania
	Dridea 8'; Frăţilă 12', 25', 38'	Report	Künzli 52'; Odermatt 70'	Stadium: Stadionul Republicii; Attendance: 14,209; Referee: James Finney (England)

17 November 1966 Friendly	Romania	4–3	Poland	Ploiești, Romania
	Brejza 16' (o.g.); Gergely 28'; Frăţilă 59'; Coe 84'	Report	Jarosik 61'; Gałeczka 73'; Strzałkowski 80'	Stadium: Stadionul Petrolul; Attendance: 8,000; Referee: Roger Barde (France)

26 November 1966 Euro 1968 Q	Italy	3–1	Romania	Naples, Italy
	Mazzola 30', 67'; Paoli 43'	Report	Dobrin 7'	Stadium: Stadio San Paolo; Attendance: 75,000; Referee: Gerhard Schulenburg (West Germany)

3 December 1966 Euro 1968 Q	Cyprus	1–5	Romania	Nicosia, Cyprus
	Pieridi 33'	Report	Dridea 49', 82'; Lucescu 51'; Frăţilă 65', 74'	Stadium: Stadium Eugenia and Antonios Theodotou; Attendance: 4,800; Referee: Arthur Lentini (Malta)

7 December 1966 Friendly	Israel	1–2	Romania	Tel Aviv, Israel
	Borba 17'	Report	Badea 37'; Pîrcălab 52' (pen.)	Stadium: Bloomfield Stadium; Attendance: 18,000; Referee: Aleksandros Monastiriotis (Greece)

== 1967 ==
4 January 1967 Friendly	Uruguay	1–1	Romania	Montevideo, Uruguay
	Urrusmendi 66'	Report	Varela 7' (o.g.)	Stadium: Estadio Gran Parque Central; Attendance: 10,000; Referee: Francisco Pardiñas (Uruguay)

8 March 1967 Friendly	Greece	1–2	Romania	Athens, Greece
	Sideris 3'	Report	Ionescu 34', 75'	Stadium: Leoforos Alexandras Stadium; Attendance: 16,879; Referee: Nikolaos Yiannopoulos (Greece)

22 March 1967 Friendly	France	1–2	Romania	Paris, France
	Dogliani 88'	Report	Frăţilă 14'; Dridea 76'	Stadium: Parc des Princes; Attendance: 23,769; Referee: Günter Baumgärtel (West Germany)

23 April 1967 Euro 1968 Q	Romania	7–0	Cyprus	Bucharest, Romania
	Lucescu 4'; Martinovici 15'; Dumitru 24', 52', 77'; Ionescu 47', 86'	Report		Stadium: Stadionul 23 August; Attendance: 9,412; Referee: Milivoje Gugulović (Yugoslavia)

24 May 1967 Euro 1968 Q	Switzerland	7–1	Romania	Zürich, Switzerland
	Künzli 12', 67'; Quentin 15', 32'; Blättler 47', 59'; Odermatt 63'	Report	Dobrin 70'	Stadium: Hardturm; Attendance: 21,337; Referee: Robert Lacoste (France)

25 June 1967 Euro 1968 Q	Romania	0–1	Italy	Bucharest, Romania
		Report	Bertini 81'	Stadium: Stadionul 23 August; Attendance: 54,371; Referee: Manuel Gómez Arribas (Spain)

29 October 1967 Friendly	Poland	0–0	Romania	Kraków, Poland
		Report		Stadium: Stadion Wisły; Attendance: 32,000; Referee: Wottava Tibor (Hungary)

18 November 1967 1968 Olympics Q	East Germany	1–0	Romania	Berlin, East Germany
	Pankau 8' (pen.)	Report		Stadium: Walter Ulbricht Stadion; Attendance: 35,000; Referee: Václav Davídek (Czechoslovakia)

22 November 1967 Friendly	Romania	1–0	West Germany	Bucharest, Romania
	Vasile Gergely 83'	Report		Stadium: Stadionul 23 August; Attendance: 35,000; Referee: Franz Mayer (Austria)

6 December 1967 1968 Olympics Q	Romania	0–1	East Germany	Bucharest, Romania
		Report	Irmscher 8'	Stadium: Stadionul 23 August; Attendance: 50,000; Referee: Leonard Eliński (Poland)

24 December 1967 Friendly	DR Congo	1–1	Romania	Kinshasa, D.R. Congo
	Kidumu 75'	Report	Sasu 8'	Stadium: Stade du 20 Mai; Attendance: 30,000; Referee: Unknown

== 1968 ==
1 May 1968 Friendly	Austria	1–1	Romania	Linz, Austria
	Siber 85'	Report	Kallo 8'	Stadium: Stadion auf der Gugl; Attendance: 30,000; Referee: Karol Galba (Czechoslovakia)

5 June 1968 Friendly	Romania	0–0	Netherlands	Bucharest, Romania
		Report		Stadium: Stadionul Republicii; Attendance: 20,000; Referee: Nejat Şener (Turkey)

27 October 1968 1970 WCQ	Portugal	3–0	Romania	Oeiras, Portugal
	Santos 21', 67'; João 33'	Report		Stadium: Estádio Nacional do Jamor; Attendance: 32,222; Referee: Leo Callaghan (Wales)

6 November 1968 Friendly	Romania	0–0	England	Bucharest, Romania
		Report		Stadium: Stadionul 23 August; Attendance: 60,000; Referee: Radoslav Fiala (Czechoslovakia)

23 November 1968 1970 WCQ	Romania	2–0	Switzerland	Bucharest, Romania
	Dumitrache 58'; Domide 74'	Report		Stadium: Stadionul 23 August; Attendance: 18,854; Referee: Nejat Şener (Turkey)

== 1969 ==
15 January 1969 Friendly	England	1–1	Romania	London, England
	Charlton 27'	Report	Dumitrache 74' (pen.)	Stadium: British Empire Exhibition Stadium; Attendance: 80,000; Referee: James Callaghan (Scotland)

16 April 1969 1970 WCQ	Greece	2–2	Romania	Piraeus, Greece
	Sideris 51'; Dedes 60'	Report	Dumitrache 54', 66'	Stadium: Georgios Karaiskakis Stadium; Attendance: 37,039; Referee: Antonio Sbardella (Italy)

30 April 1969 Friendly	France	1–0	Romania	Paris, France
	Michel 80'	Report		Stadium: Parc des Princes; Attendance: 18,218; Referee: Bruno De Marchi (Italy)

14 May 1969 1970 WCQ	Switzerland	0–1	Romania	Lausanne, Switzerland
		Report	Michaud 33' (o.g.)	Stadium: Stade Olympique de La Pontaise; Attendance: 28,446; Referee: Tiny Wharton (Scotland)

3 September 1969 Friendly	Yugoslavia	1–1	Romania	Belgrade, Yugoslavia
	Mujkić 56'	Report	Dembrovschi 28'	Stadium: Stadion Jugoslovenska Narodna Armija; Attendance: 15,000; Referee: Vízhányó László (Hungary)

12 October 1969 1970 WCQ	Romania	1–0	Portugal	Bucharest, Romania
	Dobrin 30'	Report		Stadium: Stadionul 23 August; Attendance: 58,573; Referee: Ratko Čanak (Yugoslavia)

16 November 1969 1970 WCQ	Romania	1–1	Greece	Bucharest, Romania
	Dembrovschi 36'	Report	Damazos 50'	Stadium: Stadionul 23 August; Attendance: 62,577; Referee: John Adair (Northern Ireland)

== 1970 ==
9 February 1970 Friendly	Peru	1–1	Romania	Lima, Peru
	Cubillas 56'	Report	Lucescu 27'	Stadium: Estadio San Martín de Porres; Attendance: 28,831; Referee: César Orozco (Peru)

8 April 1970 Friendly	West Germany	1–1	Romania	Stuttgart, West Germany
	Overath 33'	Report	Neagu 19'	Stadium: Neckarstadion; Attendance: 69,687; Referee: Emsberger Gyula (Hungary)

28 April 1970 Friendly	France	2–0	Romania	Reims, France
	Loubet 10'; Djorkaeff 40' (pen.)	Report		Stadium: Stade Auguste Delaune; Attendance: 10,929; Referee: Othmar Huber (Switzerland)

6 May 1970 Friendly	Romania	0–0	Yugoslavia	Bucharest, Romania
		Report		Stadium: Stadionul 23 August; Attendance: 34,438; Referee: Petar Nikolov (Bulgaria)

2 June 1970 1970 WC	England	1–0	Romania	Guadalajara, Mexico
	Hurst 65'	Report		Stadium: Estadio Jalisco; Attendance: 50,560; Referee: Vital Loraux (Belgium)

6 June 1970 1970 WC	Czechoslovakia	1–2	Romania	Guadalajara, Mexico
	Petráš 4'	Report	Neagu 53'; Dumitrache 77' (pen.)	Stadium: Estadio Jalisco; Attendance: 56,818; Referee: Diego De Leo (Mexico)

10 June 1970 1970 WC	Brazil	3–2	Romania	Guadalajara, Mexico
	Pelé 19', 67'; Jairzinho 22'	Report	Dumitrache 34'; Dembrovschi 84'	Stadium: Estadio Jalisco; Attendance: 50,804; Referee: Ferdinand Marschall (Austria)

11 October 1970 Euro 1972 Q	Romania	3–0	Finland	Bucharest, Romania
	Dumitrache 28', 42'; Nunweiller 77'	Report		Stadium: Stadionul 23 August; Attendance: 36,584; Referee: Leonidas Vamvakopoulos (Greece)

11 November 1970 Euro 1972 Q	Wales	0–0	Romania	Cardiff, Wales
		Report		Stadium: Ninian Park; Attendance: 19,882; Referee: Arie van Gemert (Netherlands)

2 December 1970 Friendly	Netherlands	2–0	Romania	Amsterdam, Netherlands
	Cruijff 37', 57'	Report		Stadium: Olympisch Stadion; Attendance: 52,000; Referee: Tiny Wharton (Scotland)

== 1971 ==
18 April 1971 1972 Olympics Q	Romania	2–1	Albania	Bucharest, Romania
	Iordanescu 45'; Sălceanu 74'	Report	Zhega 55'	Stadium: Stadionul Republicii; Attendance: 9,000; Referee: Franz Wöhrer (Austria)

21 April 1971 Friendly	Yugoslavia	0–1	Romania	Novi Sad, Yugoslavia
		Report	Dembrovschi 57'	Stadium: Stadion Vojvodine; Attendance: 15,430; Referee: Stathis Papavasiliou (Greece)

16 May 1971 Euro 1972 Q	Czechoslovakia	1–0	Romania	Bratislava, Czechoslovakia
	Veselý 88'	Report		Stadium: Tehelné pole Attendance: 38,207; Referee: Fernando Leite (Portugal)

26 May 1971 1972 Olympics Q	Albania	1–2	Romania	Tirana, Albania
	Pano 29'	Report	Tătaru 57', 68'	Stadium: Stadiumi Kombëtar Qemal Stafa; Attendance: 25,000; Referee: Mohamed El Azari (Morocco)

22 September 1971 Euro 1972 Q	Finland	0–4	Romania	Helsinki, Finland
		Report	Iordănescu 25'; Lupescu 37'; Dembrovschi 55' (pen.); Lucescu 64'	Stadium: Helsingin Olympiastadion; Attendance: 2,084; Referee: Pius Kamber (Switzerland)

10 October 1971 1972 Olympics Q	Denmark	2–1	Romania	Copenhagen, Denmark
	Boc 2' (o.g.); Pedersen 15'	Report	Dembrovschi 46'	Stadium: Københavns Idrætspark; Attendance: 23,800; Referee: Klaus Ohmsen (West Germany)

14 November 1971 Euro 1972 Q	Romania	2–1	Czechoslovakia	Bucharest, Romania
	Dembrovschi 26'; Dobrin 52'	Report	Čapkovič 50'	Stadium: Stadionul 23 August; Attendance: 63,583; Referee: Milivoje Gugulović (Yugoslavia)

24 November 1971 Euro 1972 Q	Romania	2–0	Wales	Bucharest, Romania
	Lupescu 9'; Lucescu 74'	Report		Stadium: Stadionul 23 August; Attendance: 35,251; Referee: Alfred Delcourt (Belgium)

== 1972 ==
30 January 1972 Friendly	Morocco	2–4	Romania	Casablanca, Morocco
	Bouali 49', 65'	Report	Kun 9'; Radu 33'; Broşovschi 50'; Domide 70'	Stadium: Stade d`Honneur; Attendance: 20,000; Referee: Abdsalam El Morjani (Morocco)

8 April 1972 Friendly	Romania	2–0	France	Bucharest, Romania
	Iordănescu 16'; Dinu 54'	Report		Stadium: Stadionul 23 August; Attendance: 25,000; Referee: Josip Strmečki (Yugoslavia)

23 April 1972 Friendly	Romania	2–2	Peru	Bucharest, Romania
	Tătaru 65' (pen.); Marcu 75'	Report	Rojas 20'; Cubillas 61'	Stadium: Stadionul Republicii; Attendance: 6,000; Referee: Nikos Zlatanos (Greece)

29 April 1972 Euro 1972 Q	Hungary	1–1	Romania	Budapest, Hungary
	László 10'	Report	Sătmăreanu 56'	Stadium: Népstadion; Attendance: 68,585; Referee: David Smith (England)

14 May 1972 Euro 1972 Q	Romania	2–2	Hungary	Bucharest, Romania
	Dobrin 14'; Neagu 81'	Report	István 5'; Lajos 36'	Stadium: Stadionul 23 August; Attendance: 60,300; Referee: Kurt Tschenscher (West Germany)

17 May 1972 Euro 1972 Q	Hungary	2–1	Romania	Belgrade, Yugoslavia
	Lajos 26'; István 87'	Report	Neagu 32'	Stadium: Stadion Jugoslovenska Narodna Armija; Attendance: 32,130; Referee: Hristos Mihas (Greece)

21 May 1972 1972 Olympics Q	Romania	2–3	Denmark	Bucharest, Romania
	Györffy 79'; Dumitru 90'	Report	Røntved 30'; Johansson 60'; Jensen 63'	Stadium: Stadionul 23 August; Attendance: 5,000; Referee: Giorgos Katsoras (Greece)

17 June 1972 Friendly	Romania	3–3	Italy	Bucharest, Romania
	Spinosi 19' (o.g.); Domide 59'; Hajnal 89'	Report	Prati 33', 34'; Causino 74'	Stadium: Stadionul 23 August; Attendance: 25,516; Referee: Milivoje Gugulović (Yugoslavia)

3 September 1972 Friendly	Romania	1–1	Austria	Craiova, Romania
	Dembrovschi 43'	Report	Hickersberger 42'	Stadium: Stadionul Central; Attendance: 35,000; Referee: Nikola Mladenović (Yugoslavia)

20 September 1972 1974 WCQ	Finland	1–1	Romania	Helsinki, Finland
	Rissanen 86'	Report	Nunweiller 52'	Stadium: Helsingin Olympiastadion; Attendance: 5,519; Referee: Stanisław Eksztajn (Poland)

29 October 1972 1974 WCQ	Romania	2–0	Albania	Bucharest, Romania
	Dobrin 38'; Dembrovschi 41'	Report		Stadium: Stadionul 23 August; Attendance: 21,109; Referee: Leonidas Vamvakopoulos (Greece)

== 1973 ==
18 April 1973 Friendly	Soviet Union	2–0	Romania	Kiev, Soviet Union
	Onishchenko 18'; Muntyan 64'	Report		Stadium: Central Stadium; Attendance: 60,000; Referee: Szilvási József (Hungary)

6 May 1973 1974 WCQ	Albania	1–4	Romania	Tirana, Albania
	Bizi 87'	Report	Dumitru 12'; Dumitrache 25', 57'	Stadium: Stadiumi Kombëtar Qemal Stafa; Attendance: 18,049; Referee: Marijan Rauš (Yugoslavia)

27 May 1973 1974 WCQ	Romania	1–0	East Germany	Bucharest, Romania
	Dumitrache 53'	Report		Stadium: Stadionul 23 August; Attendance: 45,685; Referee: Erich Linemayr (Austria)

26 September 1973 1974 WCQ	East Germany	2–0	Romania	Leipzig, East Germany
	Bransch 42', 64'	Report		Stadium: Zentralstadion; Attendance: 77,764; Referee: Rudolf Scheurer (Switzerland)

14 October 1973 1974 WCQ	Romania	9–0	Finland	Bucharest, Romania
	Dumitru 6'; Marcu 8', 43'; Sandu 25', 65'; Dumitrache 45', 63'; Pantea 55'; Georgescu 81'	Report		Stadium: Stadionul 23 August; Attendance: 13,525; Referee: Emsberger Gyula (Hungary)

== 1974 ==
23 March 1974 Friendly	France	1–0	Romania	Paris, France
	Bereta 59'	Report		Stadium: Parc des Princes; Attendance: 20,224; Referee: John Homewood (England)

17 April 1974 Friendly	Brazil	2–0	Romania	São Paulo, Brazil
	Leivinha 9'; Edu 20'	Report		Stadium: Estádio Cícero Pompeu de Toledo; Attendance: 72,585; Referee: Robert Wurtz (France)

22 April 1974 Friendly	Argentina	2–1	Romania	Buenos Aires, Argentina
	Houseman 57'; Kempes 76'	Report	Kun 35'	Stadium: José Amalfitani Stadium; Attendance: 45,000; Referee: Arturo Ithurralde (Argentina)

29 May 1974 1973–76 BC	Romania	3–1	Greece	Bucharest, Romania
	Iordănescu 2', 32'; Lucescu 85'	Report	Sarafis 11'	Stadium: Stadionul 23 August; Attendance: 40,000; Referee: Ziya Türkdoğan (Turkey)

5 June 1974 Friendly	Netherlands	0–0	Romania	Rotterdam, Netherlands
		Report		Stadium: Stadion de Kuip; Attendance: 22,000; Referee: Riccardo Lattanzi (Italy)

23 July 1974 Friendly	Romania	4–1	Japan	Constanța, Romania
	Dumitrache 23' (pen.), 53'; Dumitru 71'; Hajnal 80'	Report	Nagai 78'	Stadium: Stadionul 1 Mai; Attendance: 8,000; Referee: Liuben Radunchev (Bulgaria)

25 September 1974 Friendly	Bulgaria	0–0	Romania	Sofia, Bulgaria
		Report		Stadium: Vasil Levski National Stadium; Attendance: 12,000; Referee: Milivoje Gugulović (Yugoslavia)

13 October 1974 Euro 1976 Q	Denmark	0–0	Romania	Copenhagen, Denmark
		Report		Stadium: Københavns Idrætspark; Attendance: 15,700; Referee: Ferdinand Biwersi (West Germany)

4 December 1974 Friendly	Israel	0–1	Romania	Tel Aviv, Israel
		Report	Sameş 80'	Stadium: Bloomfield Stadium; Attendance: 7,000; Referee: Frans Derks (Netherlands)

== 1975 ==
19 March 1975 Friendly	Turkey	1–1	Romania	Istanbul, Turkey
	Turan 3'	Report	Lucescu 7'	Stadium: İnönü Stadyumu; Attendance: 22,005; Referee: Werner Spiegel (Austria)

31 March 1975 Friendly	Czechoslovakia	1–1	Romania	Prague, Czechoslovakia
	Nehoda 41'	Report	Kun 76'	Stadium: Letenský Stadion; Attendance: 5,000; Referee: Włodzimierz Karolak (Poland)

17 April 1975 Euro 1976 Q	Spain	1–1	Romania	Madrid, Spain
	Velázquez 6'	Report	Crişan 70'	Stadium: Estadio Santiago Bernabéu; Attendance: 54,660; Referee: Charles Corver (Netherlands)

11 May 1975 Euro 1976 Q	Romania	6–1	Denmark	Bucharest, Romania
	Georgescu 28', 76'; Crişan 40', 59'; Lucescu 83'; Dinu 85'	Report	Dahl 85'	Stadium: Stadionul 23 August; Attendance: 60,000; Referee: Nikos Zlatanos (Greece)

1 June 1975 Euro 1976 Q	Romania	1–1	Scotland	Bucharest, Romania
	Georgescu 21'	Report	McQueen 89'	Stadium: Stadionul 23 August; Attendance: 52,203; Referee: Ertuğrul Dilek (Turkey)

7 June 1975 1976 Olympics Q	Romania	4–0	Denmark	Bucharest, Romania
	Kun 15'; Sandu 65'; Dumitru 66'; Dinu 82'	Report		Stadium: Stadionul 23 August; Attendance: 8,000; Referee: Hilmi Ok (Turkey)

18 June 1975 1976 Olympics Q	Denmark	1–2	Romania	Copenhagen, Denmark
	Mauritzen 27'	Report	Sandu 47', 49'	Stadium: Københavns Idrætspark; Attendance: 13,300; Referee: Rolf Haugen (Norway)

24 September 1975 1973–76 BC	Greece	1–1	Romania	Thessaloniki, Greece
	Sarafis 84'	Report	Dumitru 27'	Stadium: National Kaftanzogleio Stadium; Attendance: 15,000; Referee: Miloš Kajić (Yugoslavia)

12 October 1975 Friendly	Romania	2–2	Turkey	Bucharest, Romania
	Iordănescu 23'; Dinu 90'	Report	Özdenak 14'; Turan 80'	Stadium: Stadionul 23 August; Attendance: 5,000; Referee: Marian Kustoń (Poland)

16 November 1975 Euro 1976 Q	Romania	2–2	Spain	Bucharest, Romania
	Georgescu 72'; Iordănescu 80'	Report	Villar 29'; Santillana 56'	Stadium: Stadionul 23 August; Attendance: 45,381; Referee: Hans-Joachim Weyland (West Germany)

19 November 1975 Friendly	Romania	2–2	Soviet Union	Bucharest, Romania
	Troi 5'; Hajnal 85'	Report	Kolotov 44' (pen.); Konkov 47'	Stadium: Stadionul 23 August; Attendance: 15,000; Referee: Rudi Glöckner (East Germany)

3 December 1975 1976 Olympics Q	France	4–0	Romania	Blois, France
	Fernandez 43'; Rouyer 65', 72', 80'	Report		Stadium: Stade des Allées Jean Leroi; Attendance: 6,051; Referee: John Homewood (England)

17 December 1975 Euro 1976 Q	Scotland	1–1	Romania	Glasgow, Scotland
	Rioch 39'	Report	Crişan 74'	Stadium: Hampden Park; Attendance: 11,375; Referee: Adolf Prokop (East Germany)

== 1976 ==
24 March 1976 1976 Olympics Q	Romania	1–0	France	Bucharest, Romania
	Bölöni 10'	Report		Stadium: Stadionul 23 August; Attendance: 40,000; Referee: Giorgos Katsoras (Greece)

6 April 1976 1976 Olympics Q	Netherlands	0–3	Romania	Roosendaal, Netherlands
		Report	Iordănescu 54' (pen.), 57', 62'	Stadium: Stadion De Luiten; Attendance: 3,000; Referee: Norbert Rolles (Luxembourg)

14 April 1976 1976 Olympics Q	Romania	5–1	Netherlands	Bucharest, Romania
	Mulţescu 20'; Hajnal 25'; Iordănescu 45' (pen.); Zamfir 64'; Dinu 84'	Report	Peters 11'	Stadium: Stadionul 23 August; Attendance: 30,000; Referee: Richard Casha (Malta)

12 May 1976 1973–76 BC	Bulgaria	1–0	Romania	Veliko Trnovo, Bulgaria
	Vasilev 49'	Report		Stadium: Ivaylo Stadium; Attendance: 30,000; Referee: Orhan Cebe (Turkey)

5 June 1976 Friendly	Italy	4–2	Romania	Milan, Italy
	Graziani 49'; Antognoni 60'; Bettega 70', 74'	Report	Lucescu 65'; Georgescu 77'	Stadium: Stadio San Siro; Attendance: 30,329; Referee: Paul Schiller (Austria)

2 July 1976 Friendly	Iran	2–2	Romania	Tehran, Iran
	Ghleechkhani 40'; Nooraei 65'	Report	Bölöni 3'; Sandu 82'	Stadium: Aryamehr Stadium; Attendance: 60,000; Referee: Jafar Namdar (Iran)

22 September 1976 Friendly	Romania	1–1	Czechoslovakia	Bucharest, Romania
	Georgescu 30'	Report	Penenka 23'	Stadium: Stadionul 23 August; Attendance: 15,000; Referee: Panayotis Kolliropoulos (Greece)

6 October 1976 Friendly	Czechoslovakia	3–2	Romania	Prague, Czechoslovakia
	Penenka 39'; Dobiaš 67'; Ondruš 69'	Report	Balaci 7'; Georgescu 53'	Stadium: Letenský Stadion; Attendance: 15,000; Referee: Nagy Béla (Hungary)

28 November 1976 1973–76 BC	Romania	3–2	Bulgaria	Bucharest, Romania
	Troi 47'; Bölöni 54'; Mulţescu 78'	Report	Garbski 13'; Zhelyazkov 69'	Stadium: Stadionul 23 August; Attendance: 40,000; Referee: Teodoros Tsanaklidis (Greece)

== 1977 ==
23 March 1977 1977–80 BC	Romania	4–0	Turkey	Bucharest, Romania
	Georgescu 23'; Dumitru 62'; Vigu 75'; Iordănescu 82'	Report		Stadium: Stadionul Steaua; Attendance: 10,000; Referee: Panayotis Kolliropoulos (Greece)

16 April 1977 1978 WCQ	Romania	1–0	Spain	Bucharest, Romania
	Benito 6' (o.g.)	Report		Stadium: Stadionul Steaua; Attendance: 18,500; Referee: John Gordon (Scotland)

27 April 1977 Friendly	Romania	1–1	East Germany	Bucureşti, Romania
	Dumitru 39'	Report	Kurbjuweit 31'	Stadium: Stadionul Steaua; Attendance: 17,000; Referee: Pablo Sánchez Ibáñez (Spain)

8 May 1977 1978 WCQ	Yugoslavia	0–2	Romania	Zagreb, Yugoslavia
		Report	Georgescu 37'; Iordănescu 44'	Stadium: Stadion Maksimir; Attendance: 45,000; Referee: Menahem Ashkenazi (Israel)

5 August 1977 Friendly	Iran	0–0	Romania	Tehran, Iran
		Report		Stadium: Aryamehr Stadium; Attendance: 60,000; Referee: Jafar Namdar (Iran)

14 August 1977 CM V 1977	Czechoslovakia	1–3	Romania	Rabat, Morocco
	Nehoda 30'	Report	Georgescu 10', 35' (pen.); Iordănescu 85'	Stadium: Stade de F.U.S. Attendance: 12,000; Referee: Mohamed Larache (Morocco)

21 September 1977 Friendly	Romania	6–1	Greece	Bucharest, Romania
	Dumitru 7', 32', 77'; Bölöni 22', 42'; Georgescu 80'	Report	Karavitis 28'	Stadium: Stadionul Steaua; Attendance: 15,000; Referee: René Vigliani (France)

26 October 1977 1978 WCQ	Spain	2–0	Romania	Madrid, Spain
	Leal 74'; Cano 83'	Report		Stadium: Estadio Vicente Calderón; Attendance: 40,000; Referee: Robert Wurtz (France)

13 November 1977 1978 WCQ	Romania	4–6	Yugoslavia	Bucharest, Romania
	Vigu 2'; Iordănescu 40'; Bölöni 43'; Georgescu 67'	Report	Sušić 14', 51', 62'; Mužinić 18'; Trifunović 79'; Filipović 84'	Stadium: Stadionul Steaua; Attendance: 30,000; Referee: Alfred Delcourt (Belgium)

== 1978 ==
22 March 1978 1977–80 BC	Turkey	1–1	Romania	Istanbul, Turkey
	Özden 10'	Report	Georgescu 80'	Stadium: İnönü Stadyumu; Attendance: 10,000; Referee: Toma Manojlovski (Yugoslavia)

5 April 1978 Friendly	Argentina	2–0	Romania	Buenos Aires, Argentina
	Passarella 20', 33'	Report		Stadium: Estadio La Bombonera; Attendance: 80,000; Referee: Juan Daniel Cardellino (Uruguay)

5 May 1978 1977–80 BC	Romania	2–0	Bulgaria	Bucharest, Romania
	Iordănescu 2'; Balaci 74'	Report		Stadium: Stadionul 23 August; Attendance: 30,000; Referee: Vlado Tauzes (Yugoslavia)

14 May 1978 Friendly	Romania	0–1	Soviet Union	Bucharest, Romania
		Report	Blokhin 27'	Stadium: Stadionul 23 August; Attendance: 40,000; Referee: Marian Środecki (Poland)

31 May 1978 1977–80 BC	Bulgaria	1–1	Romania	Sofia, Bulgaria
	Mladenov 16'	Report	Iordănescu 34'	Stadium: Vasil Levski National Stadium; Attendance: 10,000; Referee: Dimitris Sarakinos (Greece)

11 October 1978 Friendly	Romania	1–0	Poland	Bucharest, Romania
	Iordănescu 10'	Report		Stadium: Stadionul Steaua; Attendance: 15,000; Referee: Yordan Zhezhov (Bulgaria)

25 October 1978 Euro 1980 Q	Romania	3–2	Yugoslavia	Bucharest, Romania
	Sameş 62', 63'; Iordănescu 75' (pen.)	Report	Petrović 21' (pen.); Desnica 90'	Stadium: Stadionul Steaua; Attendance: 24,090; Referee: Riccardo Lattanzi (Italy)

15 November 1978 Euro 1980 Q	Spain	1–0	Romania	Valencia, Spain
	Asensi 9'	Report		Stadium: Estadio Luís Casanova; Attendance: 46,000; Referee: Jan Keizer (Netherlands)

13 December 1978 Friendly	Greece	2–1	Romania	Athens, Greece
	Koudas 43'; Nikoloudis 70'	Report	Romilă 85' (pen.)	Stadium: Leoforos Alexandras Stadium; Attendance: 6,259; Referee: Jan Peeters (Belgium)

19 December 1978 Friendly	Israel	1–1	Romania	Tel Aviv, Israel
	Malmilian 54'	Report	Stan 77'	Stadium: Bloomfield Stadium; Attendance: 7,000; Referee: Franz Latzin (Austria)

== 1979 ==
21 March 1979 Friendly	Romania	3–0	Greece	Bucharest, Romania
	Dumitru 5'; Balaci 45'; Georgescu 83'	Report		Stadium: Stadionul Steaua; Attendance: 17,259; Referee: Spas Lukov (Bulgaria)

4 April 1979 Euro 1980 Q	Romania	2–2	Spain	Craiova, Romania
	Georgescu 55' (pen.), 64'	Report	Dani 57', 69'	Stadium: Stadionul Central; Attendance: 40,000; Referee: Marcel van Langenhove (Belgium)

13 May 1979 Euro 1980 Q	Cyprus	1–1	Romania	Limassol, Cyprus
	Kaiafas 4'	Report	Augustin 30'	Stadium: Tsirion Athletic Center; Attendance: 8,000; Referee: Dimitar Parmakov (Bulgaria)

1 June 1979 Friendly	East Germany	1–0	Romania	Berlin, East Germany
	Streich 64'	Report		Stadium: Stadion der Weltjugend; Attendance: 50,000; Referee: Palotai Károly (Hungary)

29 August 1979 Friendly	Poland	3–0	Romania	Warsaw, Poland
	Lato 30'; Terlecki 77'; Boniek 84'	Report		Stadium: Stadion Dziesięciolecia Manifestu Lipcowego; Attendance: 20,000; Referee: Anders Mattsson (Finland)

14 October 1979 Friendly	Soviet Union	3–1	Romania	Moscow, Soviet Union
	Khidiyatullin 16'; Buryak 18' (pen.); Yurchishin 84'	Report	Nicolae 24'	Stadium: Lenin Central Stadium; Attendance: 27,000; Referee: Aleksandar Nikić (Yugoslavia)

31 October 1979 Euro 1980 Q	Yugoslavia	2–1	Romania	Kosovska Mitrovica, Yugoslavia
	Vujović 48'; Slišković 50'	Report	Răducanu 79'	Stadium: Stadion Trepče; Attendance: 24,397; Referee: Jan Redelfs (West Germany)

18 November 1979 Euro 1980 Q	Romania	2–0	Cyprus	Bucharest, Romania
	Mulţescu 42'; Răducanu 75'	Report		Stadium: Stadionul Dinamo; Attendance: 10,000; Referee: Dušan Krchňák (Czechoslovakia)
