= 1966–67 Divizia A =

49th season of top-tier football league in Romania

Divizia A
- Season: 1966–67
- Champions: Rapid București
- Top goalscorer: Ion Oblemenco (17)

The 1966–67 Divizia A was the forty-ninth season of Divizia A, the top-level football league of Romania.

== Teams ==
Location of teams in 1966-67 Divizia A

== League table ==
Pos	Team	Pld	W	D	L	GF	GA	GD	Pts	Qualification or relegation
1	Rapid București (C)	26	13	8	5	39	21	+18	34	Qualification to European Cup first round
2	Dinamo București	26	13	6	7	38	23	+15	32	
3	Universitatea Craiova	26	13	4	9	38	32	+6	30	
4	Farul Constanța	26	11	7	8	38	36	+2	29	
5	Steaua București	26	10	6	10	36	28	+8	26	Qualification to Cup Winners' Cup first round
6	Universitatea Cluj	26	9	8	9	31	30	+1	26	
7	Steagul Roșu Brașov	26	10	6	10	31	37	−6	26	
8	Jiul Petroșani	26	11	3	12	41	32	+9	25	
9	Petrolul Ploiești	26	9	7	10	25	26	−1	25	Invitation to Inter-Cities Fairs Cup first round
10	Progresul București	26	9	6	11	29	34	−5	24	
11	UTA Arad	26	7	10	9	31	36	−5	24	
12	Dinamo Pitești	26	10	3	13	34	41	−7	23	Invitation to Inter-Cities Fairs Cup first round
13	CSMS Iași (R)	26	7	7	12	30	53	−23	21	Relegation to Divizia B
14	Politehnica Timișoara (R)	26	6	7	13	33	45	−12	19	Relegation to Divizia B

Source: LT
Rules for classification: 1) points; 2) goal difference; 3) number of goals scored
(C) Champions; (R) Relegated

=== Results ===
Home \ Away	IAȘ	UCR	DIN	PIT	FAR	JIU	PET	PRO	RAP	SRB	STE	POL	UTA	UCL
CSMS Iași	—	2–1	0–0	1–2	3–1	2–1	1–0	1–1	2–2	1–1	1–7	4–1	3–1	2–2
Universitatea Craiova	1–0	—	1–1	1–0	3–0	3–2	1–0	1–0	1–0	3–2	3–0	3–1	4–1	0–0
Dinamo București	2–1	4–1	—	2–0	5–2	1–0	1–0	2–0	2–1	0–1	1–1	1–0	1–1	4–0
Dinamo Pitești	5–2	2–1	1–3	—	1–0	4–2	0–0	1–0	2–2	4–3	1–0	2–0	3–1	2–4
Farul Constanța	2–0	4–1	2–1	2–0	—	2–1	1–0	5–1	1–1	3–0	1–0	1–1	0–0	2–1
Jiul Petroșani	3–0	2–1	0–3	4–0	0–0	—	3–1	2–1	0–1	7–0	2–0	3–1	1–0	0–1
Petrolul Ploiești	0–0	2–1	3–0	1–0	2–0	2–0	—	1–2	0–0	1–1	0–1	1–0	2–1	1–0
Progresul București	1–2	2–2	0–2	1–0	3–1	1–1	1–2	—	1–1	1–0	1–0	1–0	4–0	2–1
Rapid București	8–1	1–0	2–0	2–1	2–2	1–0	3–1	1–0	—	1–0	3–0	2–0	0–0	2–1
Steagul Roșu Brașov	5–0	1–0	1–0	1–1	1–3	2–0	2–2	2–0	2–1	—	0–0	2–1	0–1	1–0
Steaua București	2–0	4–1	1–0	1–0	5–0	2–1	1–1	2–2	0–0	0–1	—	3–2	0–1	4–1
Politehnica Timișoara	1–1	0–2	4–2	3–1	1–1	1–2	1–0	3–1	1–0	1–1	1–1	—	4–2	1–1
UTA Arad	1–0	1–1	0–0	2–1	2–2	0–2	0–0	1–1	1–2	5–1	3–1	5–2	—	0–0
Universitatea Cluj	2–0	0–1	0–0	2–0	1–0	2–2	5–2	0–1	2–0	1–0	1–0	2–2	1–1	—

Source: LT (in Romanian)
Legend: Blue = home team win; Yellow = draw; Red = away team win.

== Top goalscorers ==
Rank	Player	Club	Goals
1	Ion Oblemenco	Universitatea Craiova	17
2	Florea Voinea	Steaua București	16
3	Ion Ionescu	Rapid București	15
4	Nicolae Nagy	Dinamo Pitești	14
5	Constantin Iancu	Farul Constanța	13
5	Marin Peronescu	Jiul Petroșani	13

== Champion squad ==
Rapid București

Goalkeepers: Răducanu Necula (24 / 0); Marin Andrei (3 / 0).
Defenders: Nicolae Lupescu (26 / 1); Ion Motroc (25 / 0); Dan Coe (26 / 0); Ilie Greavu (25 / 0); Vasile Ștefan (3 / 0); Savu Costea (1 / 0).
Midfielders: Constantin Dinu (23 / 1); Nicolae Georgescu (6 / 0); Constantin Jamaischi (21 / 2).
Forwards: Constantin Năsturescu (25 / 3); Emil Dumitriu (26 / 12); Ion Ionescu (22 / 15); Teofil Codreanu (23 / 2); Paul Mitroi (3 / 0); Viorel Kraus (12 / 2); Alexandru Neagu (8 / 1).
(league appearances and goals listed in brackets)

Manager: Valentin Stănescu.

== See also ==
- 1966–67 Divizia B
