= Vasile Gergely =

Romanian footballer

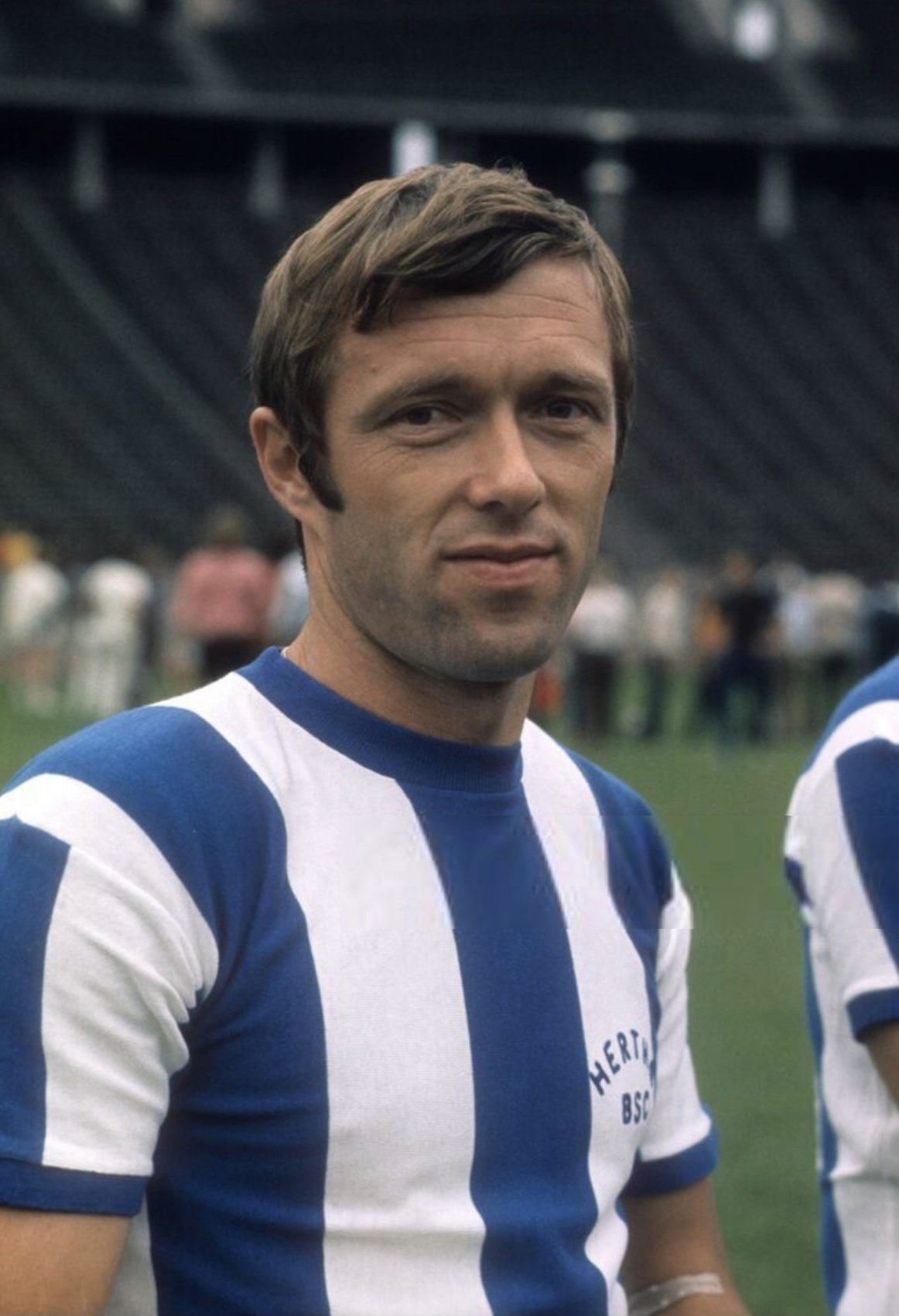
- Gergely with Hertha BSC

Personal information
- Full name: László Vasile Gergely
- Date of birth: 28 October 1941 (age 84)
- Place of birth: Baia Mare, Romania
- Date of death: 2020 (aged 78–79)
- Place of death: South Africa
- Height: 1.72 m (5 ft 8 in)
- Position: Midfielder

Youth career
- CSM Baia Mare

Senior career*
Years	Team	Apps	(Gls)
1958–1962	CSM Baia Mare		
1962	Viitorul București	9	(2)
1963–1970	Dinamo București	136	(5)
1970–1972	Hertha BSC	35	(0)
1972–1973	Durban City		
Total		180	(7)

International career
1962	Romania U18		
1962–1970	Romania (Note: Including 2 appearances for Romania's Olympic team.)	36	(2)

Managerial career
- BFC Germania 1888
- * Club domestic league appearances and goals

László Vasile Gergely (Hungarian: Gergely László; 28 October 1941 – 2020) was a Romanian football player and manager.

== Club career ==
Gergely was born on 28 October 1941 in Baia Mare, Romania and began playing football in Divizia B at local club CSM Baia Mare. He made his Divizia A debut under coach Gheorghe Ola on 19 August 1962, playing for Viitorul București in a 7–0 home victory against Minerul Lupeni. However, in the middle of the season the club dissolved and he went to play for Dinamo București, coach Traian Ionescu using him in just one game in the second half of the season as the club won the title. In the next two seasons, he helped The Red Dogs win another two championships, coaches Ionescu and Nicolae Dumitru giving him three appearances in the first and under the guidance of Angelo Niculescu he played 20 games in the second. During his eight seasons spent at Dinamo, Gergely also won two Cupa României. In the 1964 final, coach Ionescu did not use him in the 5–3 victory over rivals Steaua București, but in the 1968 final, he played the entire match in the 3–1 win against Rapid București under coach Bazil Marian. Gergely played in eight matches and scored once in European competitions for Dinamo. In the 1963–64 European Cup edition, he helped the club get past Denmark's champion, Boldklubben 1909 against which he scored a goal. The campaign ended in the next round where they were defeated by the winners of the previous two seasons of the competition, Inter Milan, but he helped the team earn a historical 2–1 victory in the first leg. For the way he played in 1966, Gergely was placed second in the ranking for the Romanian Footballer of the Year award, behind only Nicolae Dobrin.

After a tournament with Dinamo in West Germany, he remained there, signing with Hertha BSC. Gergely made his Bundesliga debut on 15 August 1970 when coach Helmut Kronsbein sent him in the 68th minute to replace Karl-Heinz Ferschl in a 5–3 home win over 1. FC Kaiserslautern. He played 31 games in the 1970–71 season as the club finished in third position. In the same season he appeared in both legs and scored a goal in the 8–3 aggregate victory against Boldklubben 1901 in the first round of the 1970–71 Inter-Cities Fairs Cup. He was banned for life in January 1972 together with other players for throwing the game against Arminia Bielefeld and accepting a 15,000 Deutsche mark bribe in exchange. Afterwards, Gergely went to play for Durban City in South Africa where he could play because at that time the country was not a member of FIFA, winning the 1972 National Football League. He also worked as a police officer during that time. In November 1973, the German Football Association cancelled his and the other players' suspensions. It is believed that the case was hastily and superficially tried and the players were unduly pardoned because the image of the 1974 World Cup, which was to be held in Germany, would have been affected. Even though his suspension was lifted, Gergely retired at age 32, afterwards serving as head coach at BFC Germania 1888, a junior coach at 1. FC Wilmersdorf, and also working at the latter club's casino. Gergely has a total of 145 matches with seven goals in Divizia A and 35 appearances in Bundesliga.

== International career ==
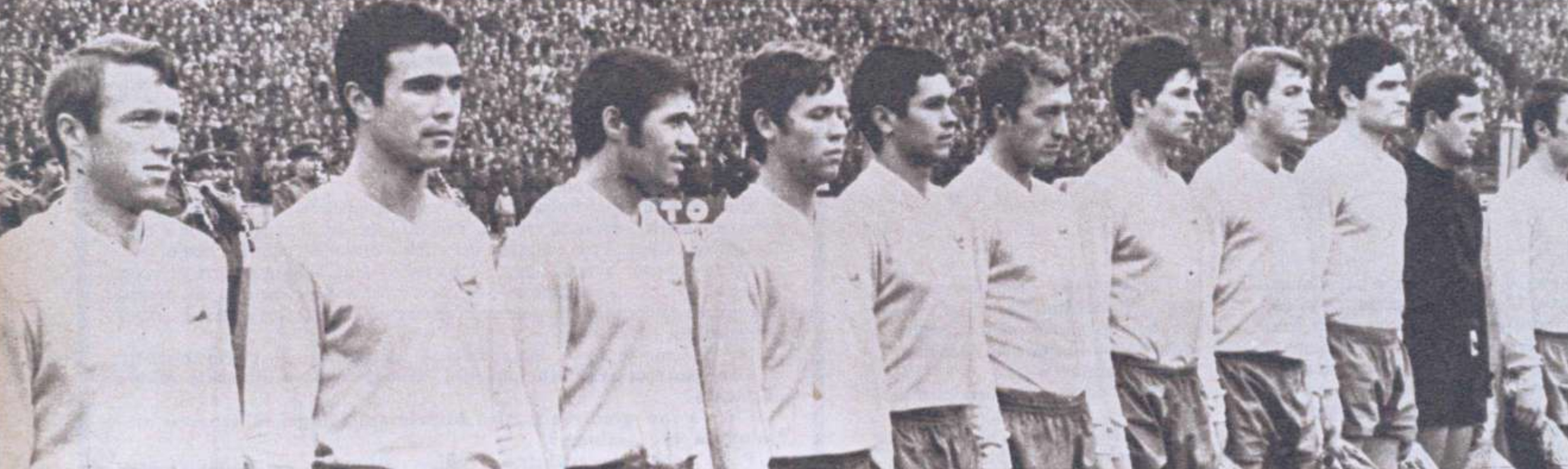
Gergely (first from the left) with Romania ahead of their friendly match against England in 1968

Under the guidance of coaches Nicolae Dumitrescu and Gheorghe Ola, Gergely helped Romania's under-18 national team win the 1962 European championship. He scored a goal in the 4–1 victory against Yugoslavia in the final.

Gergely played 34 matches for Romania and scored two goals, making his debut on 30 September 1962 under coach Constantin Teașcă in a 4–0 friendly victory against Morocco. He went on to play two games in the 1964 European Nations' Cup qualifiers, four in the 1966 World Cup qualifiers and five during the Euro 1968 qualifiers. Gergely played four games in the successful 1970 World Cup qualifiers. He was used by coach Angelo Niculescu in the 2–1 victory against Czechoslovakia during the group stage of the final tournament, being sent in the 81st minute to replace Ion Dumitru, which marked his last appearance for the national team that did not advance to the next stage.

== Personal life and death ==
His brothers, Iuliu and Iosif, were also footballers.

Gergely died in 2020 at the age of 79 in South Africa.

== Career statistics ==
Scores and results list Romania's goal tally first. "Score" column indicates the score after each Gergely goal.

#	Date	Venue	Opponent	Score	Result	Competition
1.	17 November 1966	Petrolul Stadium, Ploiești, Romania	Poland	2–0	4–3	Friendly
2.	22 November 1967	23 August Stadium, Bucharest, Romania	West Germany	1–0	1–0	Friendly

== Honours ==
Dinamo București

- Divizia A: 1962–63, 1963–64, 1964–65
- Cupa României: 1963–64, 1967–68

Durban City

- National Football League: 1972

Romania U18

- UEFA European Under-18 Championship: 1962

Individual

- Gazeta Sporturilor Romanian Footballer of the Year (runner-up): 1966
