= Emil Dumitriu =

Romanian footballer

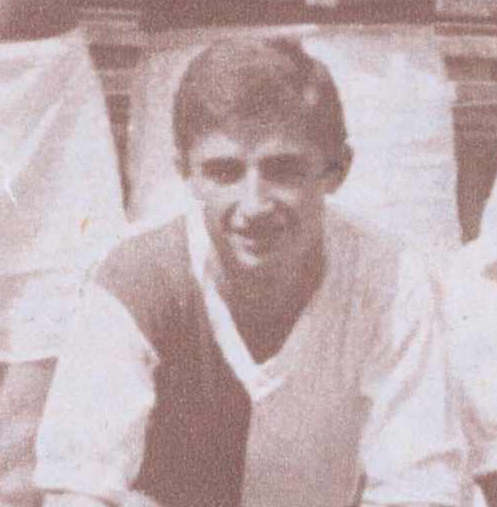
- Dumitriu with Rapid București in 1963

Personal information
- Date of birth: 5 November 1942 (age 84)
- Place of birth: Bucharest, Romania
- Height: 1.73 m (5 ft 8 in)
- Position: Forward

Youth career
- 1957: Locomotiva București
- 1957–1961: Progresul CPCS București

Senior career*
Years	Team	Apps	(Gls)
1961–1962	Jiul Petroșani	8	(2)
1962	Viitorul București	12	(7)
1963–1968	Rapid București	129	(46)
1969–1971	Steagul Roșu Brașov	27	(5)
1971–1972	Dinamo București	22	(4)
1972–1973	Rapid București	37	(4)
1974	Chimia Râmnicu Vâlcea	6	(0)
1974–1976	Progresul București		
Total		241+	(68+)

International career
1962	Romania U18		
1962–1966	Romania U23	13	(4)
1964	Romania Olympic	1	(0)
1965–1968	Romania	6	(3)
Medal record
Men's football
Representing Romania
UEFA European Under-18 Championship
Winner	1962 Romania
- * Club domestic league appearances and goals

Emil Dumitriu (born 5 November 1942), commonly known as Nichi Dumitriu or Dumitriu II, is a Romanian former footballer who played as a forward.

== Club career ==
Dumitriu was born on 5 November 1942 in Bucharest, Romania and began playing junior-level football in 1957 at Locomotiva București, then joined Progresul CPCS București. He made his Divizia A debut on 25 March 1962, playing for Jiul Petroșani under coach Bazil Marian in a 3–2 victory against UTA Arad. In the following season he played in the first half for Viitorul București, going for the second half to Rapid București.

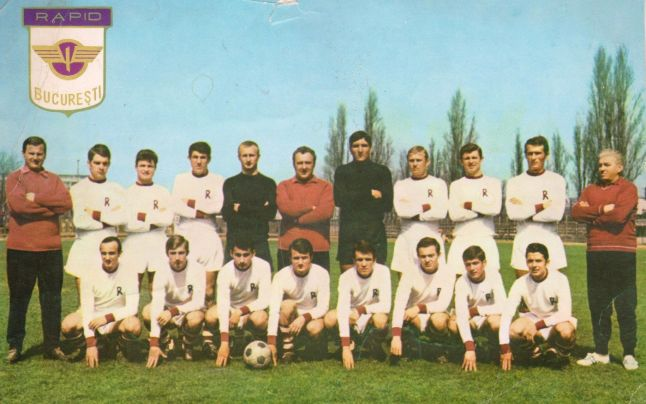
Rapid Bucharest's 1966–67 Divizia A winning squad.

During his time at Rapid, Dumitriu made a successful partnership in the team's offence with Ion Ionescu, winning the first league title in the club's history in the 1966–67 season in which he scored 12 goals in 26 matches under coach Valentin Stănescu. He made four appearances in European competitions for Rapid (including one in the Inter-cities Fairs Cup), most notably helping The Railwaymen eliminate Trakia Plovdiv in the 1967–68 European Cup and advance to the following round where they were eliminated by Juventus. He also won two Balkans Cups, netting a brace in the 2–0 win in the second leg against Farul Constanța in the final of the 1964–66 edition. For the way he played in 1966, Dumitriu was placed fourth in the ranking for the Romanian Footballer of the Year award. He suffered a lung illness which kept him off the field for one and a half years and in 1968, Stănescu took him to Steagul Roșu Brașov, aiming to help him relaunch his career. In 1971, Dumitriu went to play for one season at Dinamo București. There, on 4 June 1972 he netted the only goal in a derby win against Steaua București. Afterwards he returned for two seasons to Rapid where he made his last Divizia A appearance on 10 March 1974 in a 2–0 away loss to Argeș Pitești, totaling 235 matches with 68 goals in the competition. Dumitriu ended his career by playing three seasons in Divizia B, the first one at Chimia Râmnicu Vâlcea and the other two at Progresul București, helping both teams earn promotion to Divizia A.

== International career ==
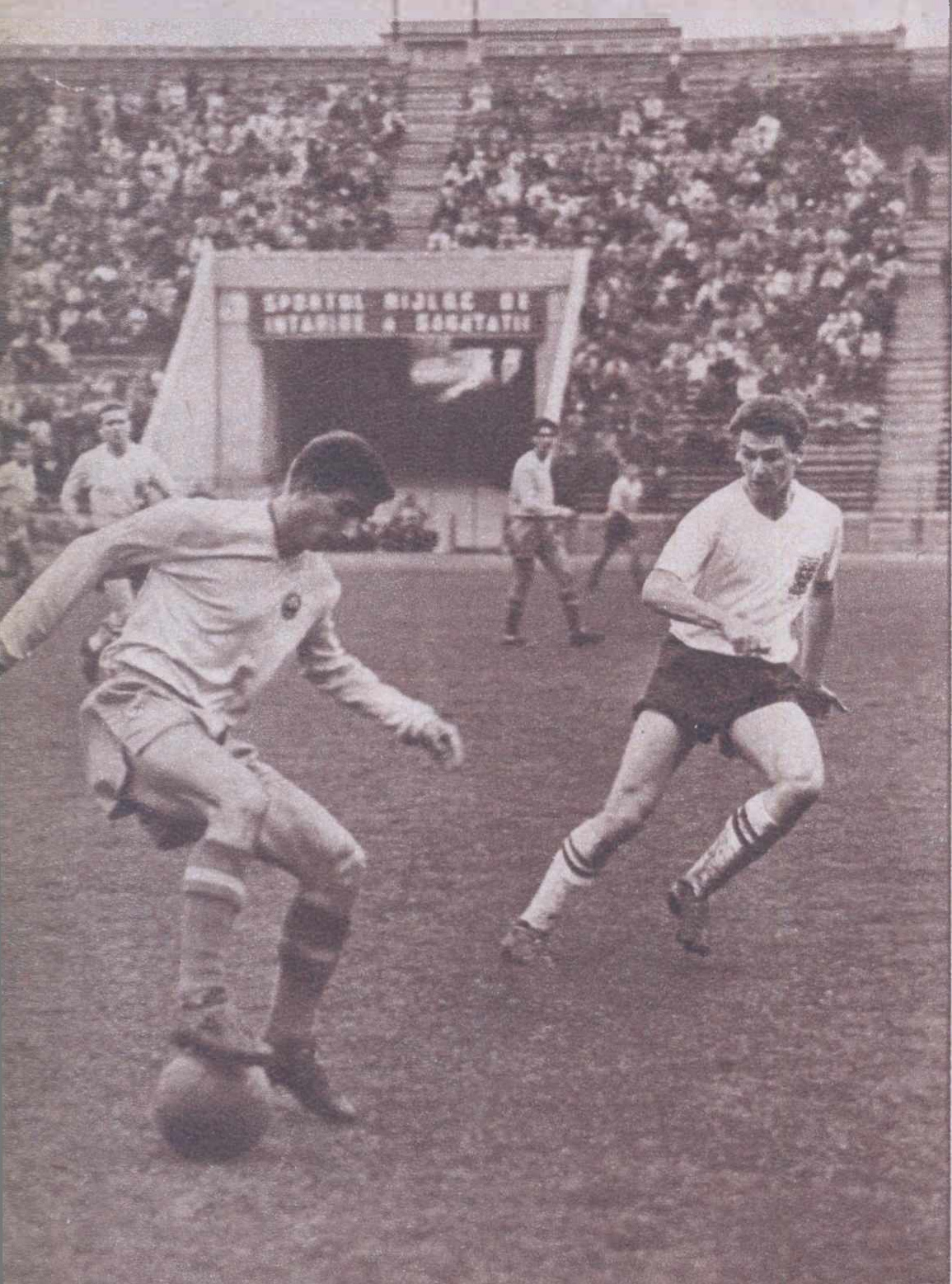
Dumitriu (pictured left in 1963) during a friendly under-23 international victory against England.

Under the guidance of coaches Nicolae Dumitrescu and Gheorghe Ola, Dumitriu helped Romania's under-18 national team win the 1962 European championship. He scored a goal in the 4–0 win over Turkey in the semi-finals and another one in the 4–1 victory against Yugoslavia in the final. Between 1962 and 1966, he played 13 games for Romania U23, scoring four goals. He appeared in a friendly match for Romania's Olympic team, that ended in a 2–1 away victory against Yugoslavia. He was selected by coach Silviu Ploeșteanu to be part of the squad for the 1964 Summer Olympics in Tokyo, but he did not play in any games due to an injury sustained during a training session caused by his teammate Mircea Petescu.

Dumitriu played six games and scored three goals for Romania, making his debut under coach Ilie Oană on 23 October 1965 in a 2–1 away loss to Turkey in the 1966 World Cup qualifiers. He played two games in the Euro 1968 qualifiers in which he scored a hat-trick in a 7–0 victory against Cyprus after which the opponents captain Kostas Panayiotou said:"Dumitriu's game is simply confusing. He is an opponent who creates nightmares". He made his last appearance for the national team on 5 June 1968 in a 0–0 friendly draw against the Netherlands.

For winning the 1962 European Under-18 Championship, Dumitriu was decorated by President of Romania, Traian Băsescu on 25 March 2008, with the Ordinul "Meritul Sportiv" – (The Medal of "Sportive Merit") Class III.

=== International goals ===
Scores and results list Romania's goal tally first, score column indicates score after each Dumitriu goal.

No.	Date	Venue	Opponent	Score	Result	Competition
1	23 April 1967	Stadionul 23. August, Bucharest, Romania	Cyprus	3–0	7–0	UEFA Euro 1968 qualifying
2	23 April 1967	Stadionul 23. August, Bucharest, Romania	Cyprus	5–0	7–0	UEFA Euro 1968 qualifying
3	23 April 1967	Stadionul 23. August, Bucharest, Romania	Cyprus	6–0	7–0	UEFA Euro 1968 qualifying

== Personal life ==
Dumitriu is the older brother of Dumitru Dumitriu (Dumitriu III), who also appeared internationally for Romania and played for Rapid București before becoming a manager, and Constantin Dumitriu (Dumitriu IV) who won the Romanian championship with Steaua București. In 1987, he settled in Athens, Greece, where he married a Greek woman.

== Honours ==
Rapid București

- Divizia A: 1966–67
- Balkans Cup: 1963–64, 1964–66

Chimia Râmnicu Vâlcea

- Divizia B: 1973–74

Progresul București

- Divizia B: 1975–76

Romania U18

- UEFA European Under-18 Championship: 1962

Individual

- Gazeta Sporturilor Romanian Footballer of the Year (fourth place): 1966

== See also ==
- List of European association football families
