= Haspolat =

Haspolat Μια Μηλιά (Greek)
- Location within Cyprus
- Coordinates: 35°12′17.77″N 33°25′17.34″E
- Country (de jure): Cyprus
  - District: Nicosia District
- Country (de facto): Northern Cyprus
  - District: Lefkoşa District

Population (2011)
  - Total: 4,204

Haspolat or Mia Milia (Greek: Μια Μηλιά or Μία Μηλιά, literally 'One Apple tree') is an industrialised village and an eastern suburb of North Nicosia in Cyprus. As a result of the Turkish invasion of Cyprus, is under the de facto control of Northern Cyprus. The Cyprus International University and the new Nicosia water treatment plant are located within its boundaries.

Mia Milia is recorded as early as the early 13th century in papal documents.

In 1973, Mia Milia had an all-Greek Cypriot population of 1,381. As of 2011, it had a population of 4,204, comprising Turkish Cypriots and Turkish nationals. Migrant workers have set up a shanty town near the industrial area.

== Notable people ==
- Sotiris Kaiafas, Cypriot retired footballer and European Golden Boot winner.
- Kostakis Pierides, Cypriot retired footballer.
