= Dan Coe =

Romanian footballer (1941–1981)

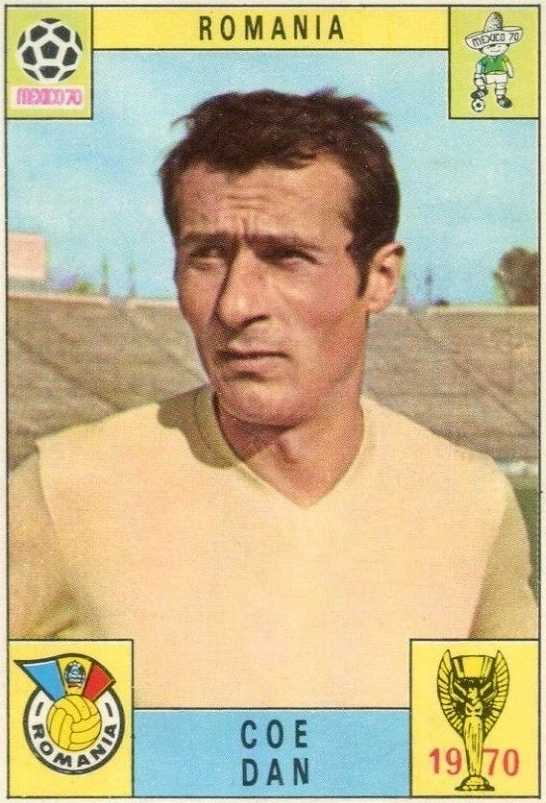
- Coe on a 1970 Panini sticker

Personal information
- Date of birth: 8 September 1941
- Place of birth: Bucharest, Romania
- Date of death: 19 October 1981 (aged 40)
- Place of death: Cologne, West Germany
- Height: 1.86 m (6 ft 1 in)
- Position: Centre-back

Youth career
- 1956–1962: Rapid București

Senior career*
Years	Team	Apps	(Gls)
1962–1971	Rapid București	202	(9)
1971–1973	Antwerp	38	(6)
1973–1975	FC Galați	35	(3)
Total		275	(18)

International career
1963–1971	Romania (Note: Including 12 appearances for Romania's Olympic team.)	41	(2)
- * Club domestic league appearances and goals

Daniel Coe (8 September 1941 – 19 October 1981) was a Romanian professional footballer who played as a centre-back. He was part of the Romanian team that reached the quarter-finals at the 1964 Summer Olympics, and later participated in the 1970 World Cup.

== Club career ==
Coe, nicknamed Ministrul Apărării ("The Minister of Defence"), was born on 8 September 1941 in Bucharest, Romania. He began playing football in 1956 at the junior squads of Rapid București, winning the 1959–60 national junior championship after defeating UTA Arad in the final. He started his senior career at Rapid, making his Divizia A debut on 18 March 1962 under coach Ion Mihăilescu in a 1–1 draw against Minerul Lupeni.

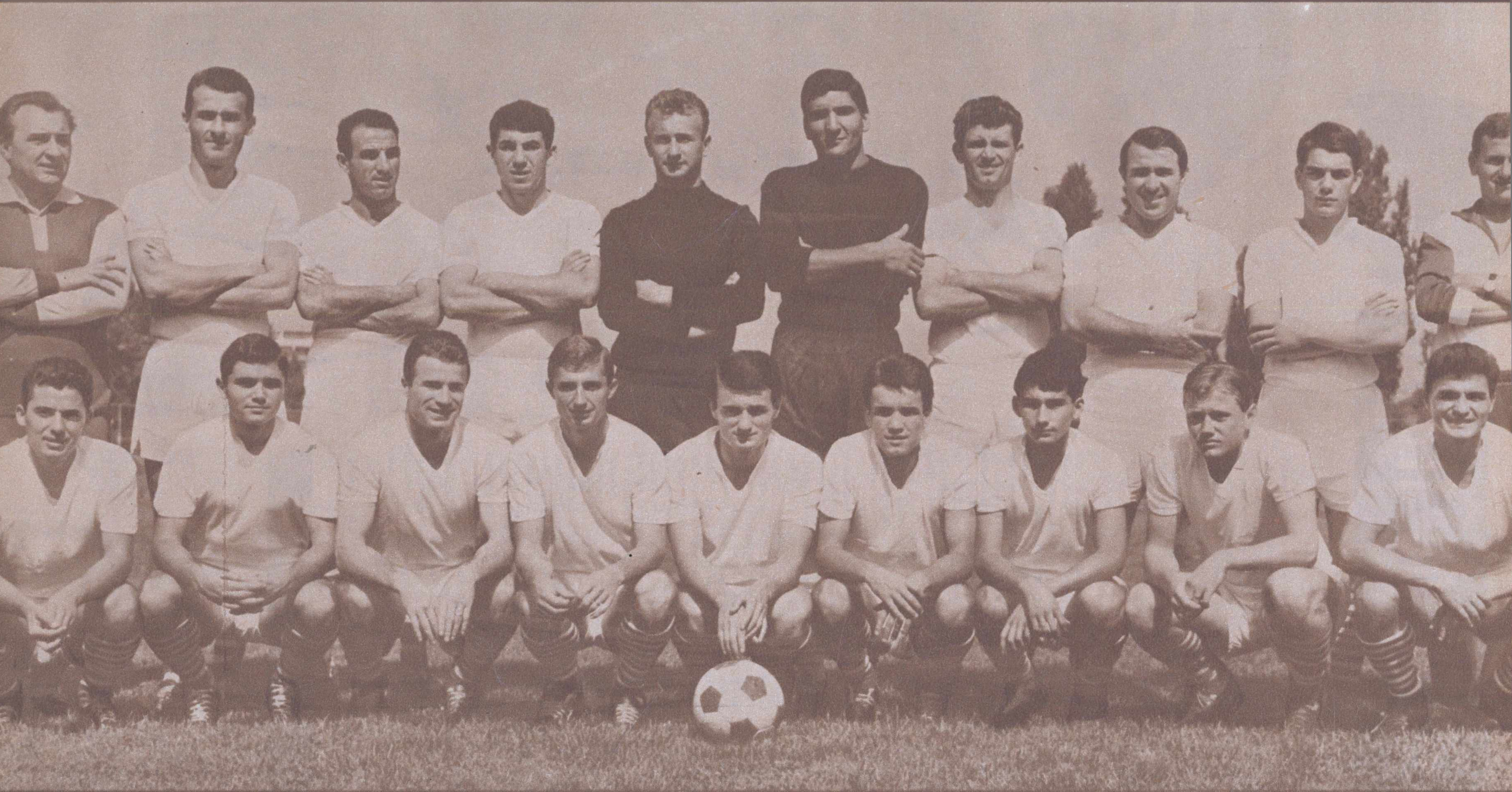
Coe (back row, second from the left) with Rapid in 1965

Coe remained with Rapid for ten seasons, serving for a while as the team's captain, winning the league title in the 1966–67 season when coach Valentin Stănescu used him in 26 matches. In the following season, he played four games in the 1967–68 European Cup, helping The Railwaymen eliminate Trakia Plovdiv and advance to the following round where they were eliminated by Juventus. Coe reached two Cupa României finals with Rapid. The first was in 1962 under coach Mihăilescu who did not use him in the loss to Steaua București and the second took place in 1968 when Stănescu used him for the entire match in the 3–1 loss to Dinamo București. He also played four games in the Inter-Cities Fairs Cup and won two Balkans Cups with the club. For the way he played in 1967, Coe was placed fifth in the ranking for the Romanian Footballer of the Year award. During these years, Rapid's fans would have a special chant during the games dedicated to him:"A cry from ancient Troy, Ahoy! To Dan Coe's fame, Ahoy! And once again, because it's allowed, Ahoy!"

In 1971, Coe managed to earn a transfer in Belgium at Royal Antwerp, being one of the few Romanian footballers who was allowed by the communist regime to play in Western Europe. After two years in which he played 38 games and scored eight goals in the Belgian First Division, he came back to Romania, playing for Divizia B club FC Galați. He helped the club earn promotion to Divizia A, where on 8 December 1974 he made his last appearance in a 6–0 loss to Universitatea Craiova, totaling 214 matches with 12 goals in the competition.

== International career ==
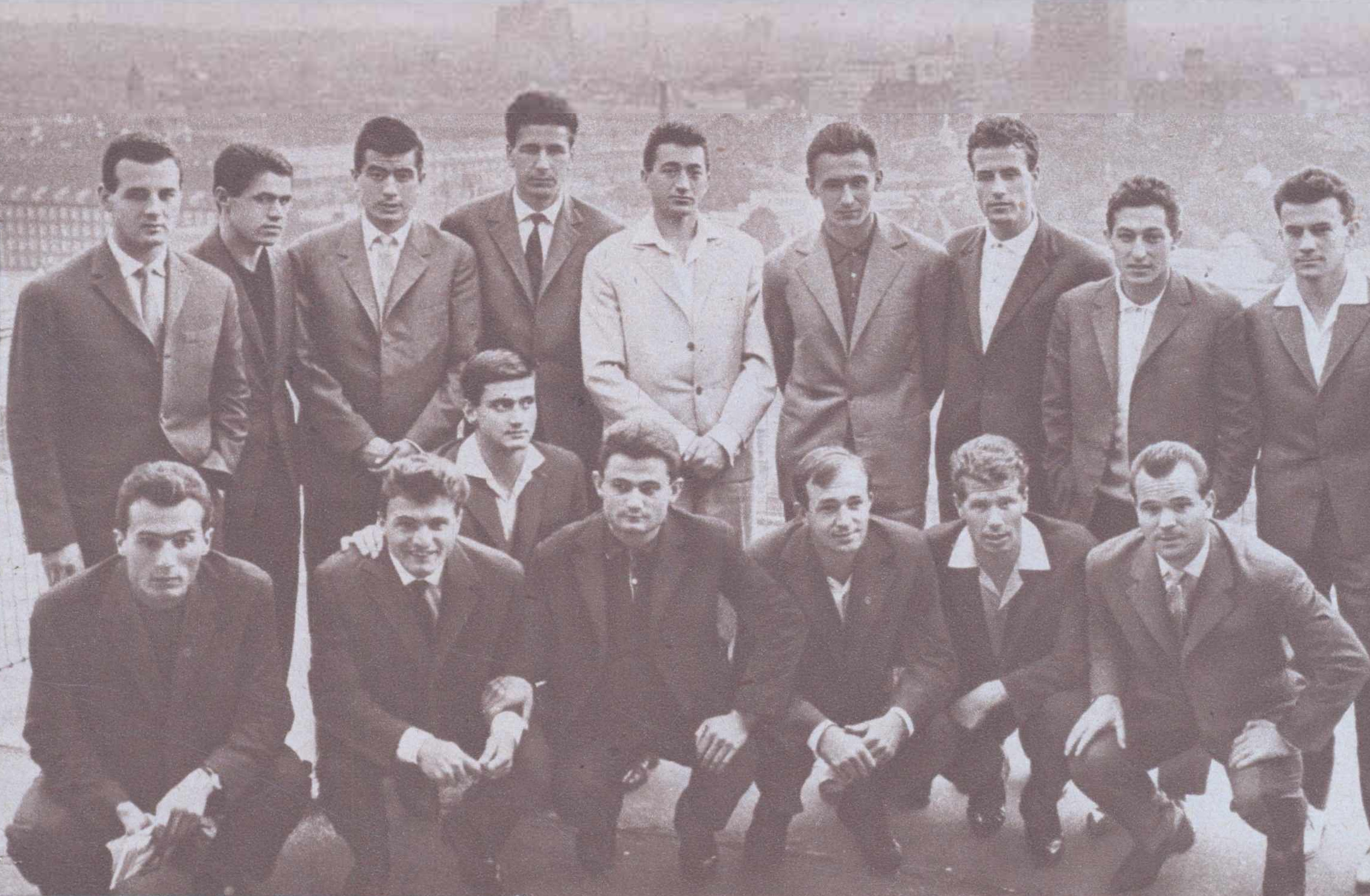
Coe in 1963 (front row, first from the left) with Romania's Olympic team in Copenhagen, Denmark

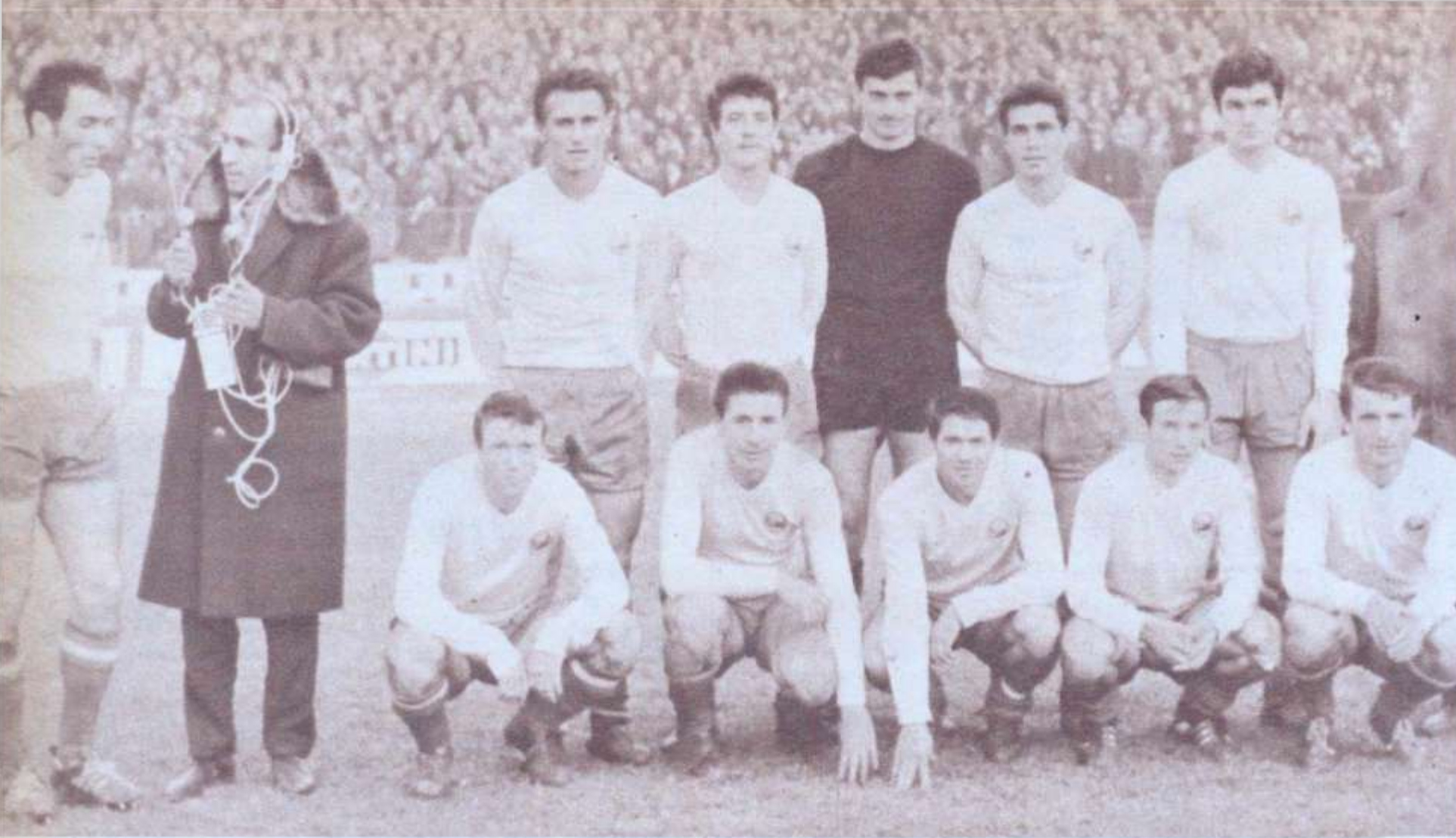
Coe (far left) being interviewed before Romania's friendly match against West Germany, which Romania won 1–0 in Bucharest, November 1967

Coe played 29 games, captaining six of them, and scored two goals for Romania, making his debut on 12 May 1963 when coach Silviu Ploeșteanu sent him in the 30th minute to replace Ion Nunweiller in a 3–2 friendly victory against East Germany. He played six games in which he scored one goal in a 3–1 away loss to Czechoslovakia during the 1966 World Cup qualifiers and made three appearances in the Euro 1968 qualifiers. Coe also played four games in the successful 1970 World Cup qualifiers, delivering a notable performance against Eusébio in Romania's 1–0 home win over Portugal. After that match, Eusébio said:"If in 1966 I had a defender to mark me like Dan Coe did today, Portugal would have never reached the semi-finals". Although selected by coach Angelo Niculescu for the 1970 World Cup squad, he did not play a single match there. Coe's last game for the national team was on 16 May 1971 in a 1–0 loss to Czechoslovakia in the Euro 1972 qualifiers.

He also played for Romania's Olympic team, being chosen by coach Ploeșteanu to be part of the 1964 Summer Olympics squad in Tokyo where he made four appearances, helping the team finish in fifth place.

=== International goals ===
Scores and results list Romania's goal tally first. "Score" column indicates the score after each Dan Coe goal.

#	Date	Venue	Opponent	Score	Result	Competition
1.	19 September 1965	Stadion Československé Armády, Prague, Czechoslovakia	Czechoslovakia	1–1	1–3	1966 World Cup qualifiers
2.	17 November 1966	Petrolul Stadium, Ploieşti, Romania	Poland	4–3	4–3	Friendly

== Personal life and death ==
His father, Duce Coe, was also a footballer who captained Sportul Studențesc București, and an Iron Guard legionnaire.

After he ended his playing career, Coe obtained permission from the communist regime to go on a trip in Belgium, but after he arrived there he settled in Cologne, West Germany as a political refugee. Shortly after an interview on Radio Free Europe in which he criticized Romania's communist regime, Coe was found dead in his apartment on 19 October 1981. His wife and his daughter found him hanged by the door handle with a rope around his neck and with his knees close to his mouth. The criminologist that investigated the case told them that he had never seen someone hang himself in such a way, therefore he recorded it as a suspicious death. It was subsequently believed that he was killed at the behest of the Romanian Securitate, but this has never been proven. His friend and fellow Romanian political refugee, Nora Nagy said years later to the press:"I don't remember what Dan said at Free Europe. Anyway, once I got here I didn't pay that much attention to the station's broadcasts, but Dan was outspoken and always spoke his mind. However, I noticed one thing. After the collaboration with Free Europe began, all sorts of dubious characters began to appear around him. I suspected many of them to have connections with the Securitate".

== Honours ==
Rapid București

- Divizia A: 1966–67
- Cupa României runner-up: 1961–62, 1967–68
- Balkans Cup: 1963–64, 1964–66

FC Galați

- Divizia B: 1973–74
