= Kostakis Pierides =

Cypriot footballer (1941–2026)

Personal information
- Date of birth: 2 April 1941
- Place of birth: Mia Milia, Cyprus
- Date of death: 8 April 2026 (aged 85)
- Position: Forward

Senior career*
Years	Team	Apps	(Gls)
1966–1967	Pezoporikos Larnaca		
1967–1968	Olympiakos Nicosia		

International career
1966–1969	Cyprus	4	(1)
- * Club domestic league appearances and goals

Kostakis Pierides (Greek: Κωστάκης Πιερίδης; 2 April 1941 – 8 April 2026) was a Cypriot footballer who played as a forward. He made four appearances for the Cyprus national team scoring once.

== Career ==
Pierides made his debut for Cyprus on 3 December 1966 in a UEFA Euro 1968 qualifying match against Romania, where he scored the only goal for Cyprus in the 5–1 loss. He went on to make four appearances, scoring one goal, before making his last appearance in 1969.

== Personal life and death ==
Pierides was born on 2 April 1941 in Mia Milia. He died on 8 April 2026, six days after his 85th birthday.

== Career statistics ==
Appearances and goals by national team and year
National team	Year	Apps	Goals
Cyprus	1966	1	1
Cyprus	1967	2	0
Cyprus	1969	1	0
Total		4	1

Score and result list Cyprus's goal tally first, score column indicates score after Pierides goal.

International goal scored by Kostakis Pierides
No.	Date	Venue	Opponent	Score	Result	Competition
1	3 December 1966	GSP Stadium, Nicosia, Cyprus	Romania	1–0	1–5	UEFA Euro 1968 qualifying

== Honours ==
- Cypriot First Division top goalscorer: 1964–65
