= Ion Ionescu (footballer, born 1938) =

Romanian footballer and manager

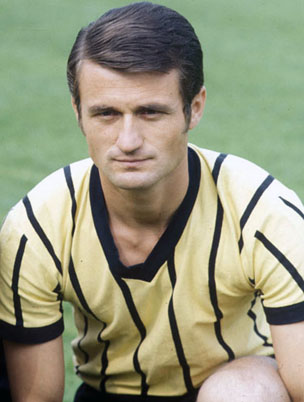
- Ionescu with Alemannia Aachen in 1968

Personal information
- Full name: Ion Gheorghe Ionescu
- Date of birth: 5 April 1938 (age 88)
- Place of birth: Bucharest, Romania
- Height: 1.74 m (5 ft 9 in)
- Position: Forward

Youth career
- Rapid București

Senior career*
Years	Team	Apps	(Gls)
1960–1968	Rapid București	183	(107)
1968–1970	Alemannia Aachen	46	(10)
1970	Crișul Oradea	1	(0)
1970–1972	Cercle Brugge	30	(8)
Total		260	(125)

International career
1962–1969	Romania (Note: Including 9 appearances and one goal for Romania's Olympic team.)	24	(5)

Managerial career
- 1973–1974: Șoimii Sibiu
- 1975–1976: CSM Suceava
- 1977–1979: Gloria Buzău
- 1980–1981: Rapid București
- 1983: CSM Suceava
- 1983–1984: FC Constanța
- * Club domestic league appearances and goals

Ion Gheorghe Ionescu (born 5 April 1938) is a Romanian former professional football player and coach who played as a forward.

== Club career ==
=== Rapid București ===
Ionescu, nicknamed "Puiu", was born on 5 April 1938 in Bucharest, Romania, growing up in the Cotroceni neighborhood. He made his Divizia A debut, playing for Rapid București under coach Ion Mihăilescu on 30 October 1960 in a 2–0 loss to Minerul Lupeni.

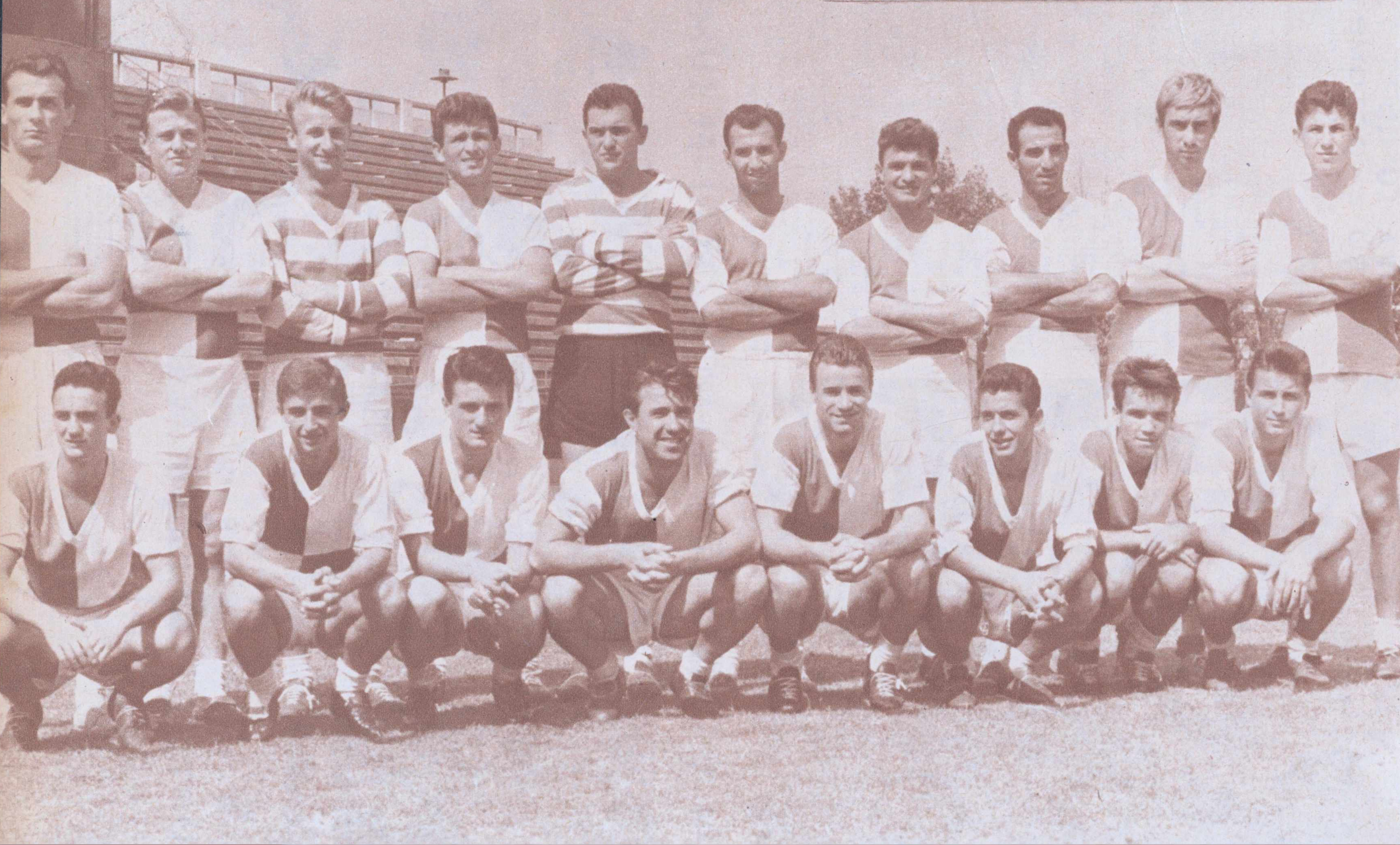
Ionescu (front row, third from left) with Rapid București in 1963

He spent eight seasons at Rapid, making a successful partnership in the team's offence with Emil Dumitriu, winning the Divizia A top-scorer title twice, in the 1962–63 season with 20 goals and in 1965–66 with 24 goals. In the 1966–67 season, under coach Valentin Stănescu he helped Rapid win its first league title, being the team's top-scorer with 15 goals scored in 22 matches. In the following season he appeared in four matches in the 1967–68 European Cup campaign, scoring one goal against Trakia Plovdiv that helped Rapid advance to the following round where they were eliminated by Juventus.

Ionescu reached three Cupa României finals, playing in the last two. The first two in 1961 and 1962 under the guidance of coach Ion Mihăilescu were lost to Arieșul Turda and Steaua București respectively. During the 1968 final he was coached by Stănescu in the loss against Dinamo București. For the way he played in 1967, Ionescu was placed fourth in the ranking for the Romanian Footballer of the Year award.

=== Alemannia Aachen ===
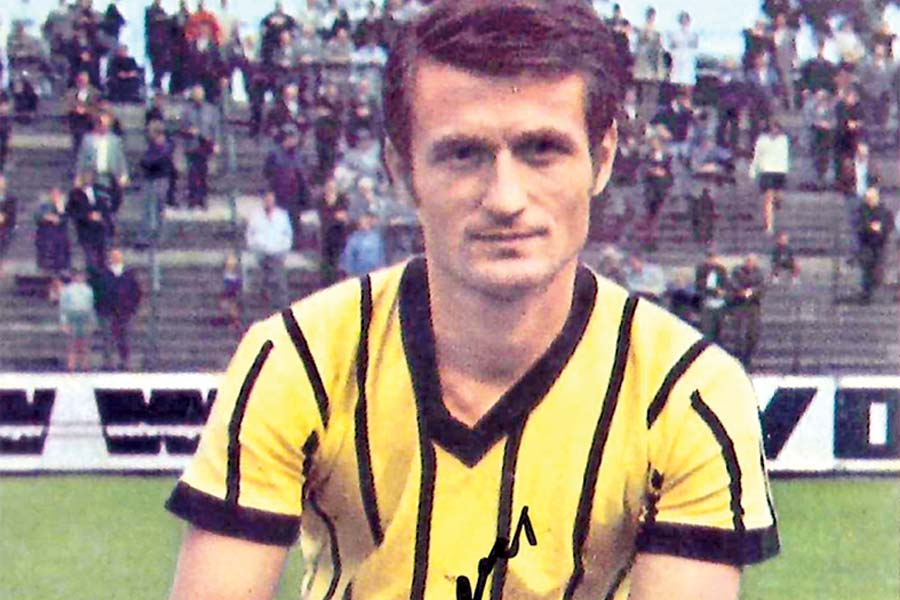
Ionescu with Alemannia Aachen

In October 1967, Rapid played a friendly game against Alemannia Aachen in which Ionescu scored two goals and in December, Romania's national team played a friendly against Aachen in which Ionescu netted three goals. These five goals impressed the leaders of the German club who wanted to transfer Ionescu to their team. During Romania's communist era, transfers of Romanian footballers outside the country were rarely allowed. Ionescu had to convince the Romanian Football Federation to approve his transfer. He managed to do so after a meeting with communist politician Gheorghe Apostol, who then spoke with Leonte Răutu. This intervention helped Ionescu receive approval for his transfer to West Germany, making him the first Romanian footballer under the communist regime to obtain the right to play abroad. Aachen paid $100,000 and a bus for his transfer.

Ionescu made his Bundesliga debut on 17 August 1968 under coach Michael Pfeiffer in a 4–1 away victory against Nürnberg. In the following round he scored a double in a 4–2 home win over Eintracht Frankfurt. Ionescu netted a total of seven goals in 24 league matches by the end of his first season at the club. This included another brace in 4–0 win over TSV 1860 Munich, helping Aachen finish second in the championship through a successful offensive partnership with Roger Claessen. He made his last Bundesliga appearance on 3 May 1970 in a 3–2 success over MSV Duisburg, having a total of 46 matches with 10 goals in the competition.

=== Crișul Oradea and Cercle Brugge ===
After spending two years in West Germany, Ionescu came back to Romania to play for Crișul Oradea where he made his last Divizia A appearance on 28 June 1970 in a 0–0 draw against Dinamo Bacău, totaling 184 matches with 107 goals in the competition. He ended his playing career in Belgium with Cercle Brugge, helping the club earn promotion to the top flight.

== International career ==
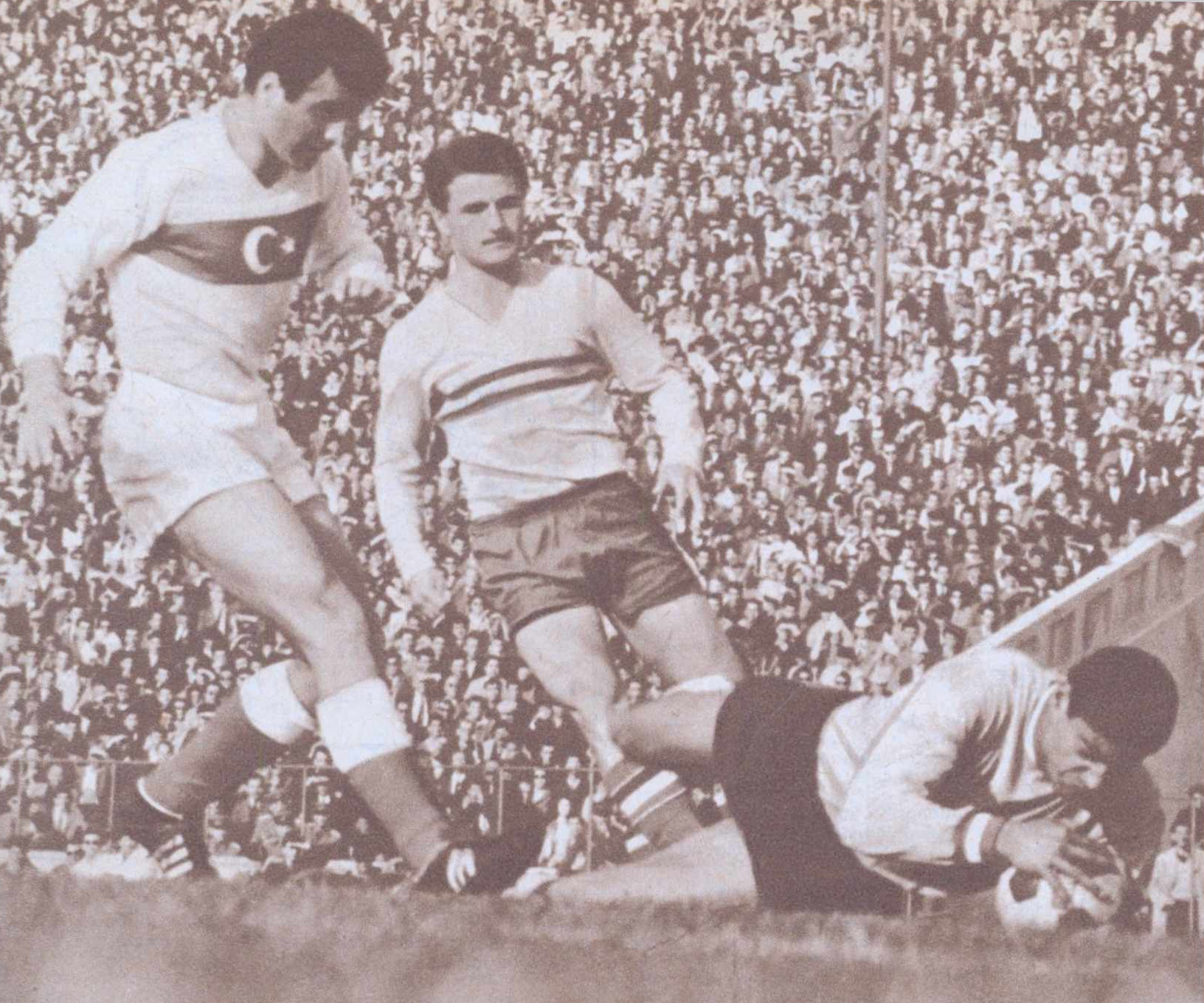
Ionescu (center) in a match against Turkey in 1965

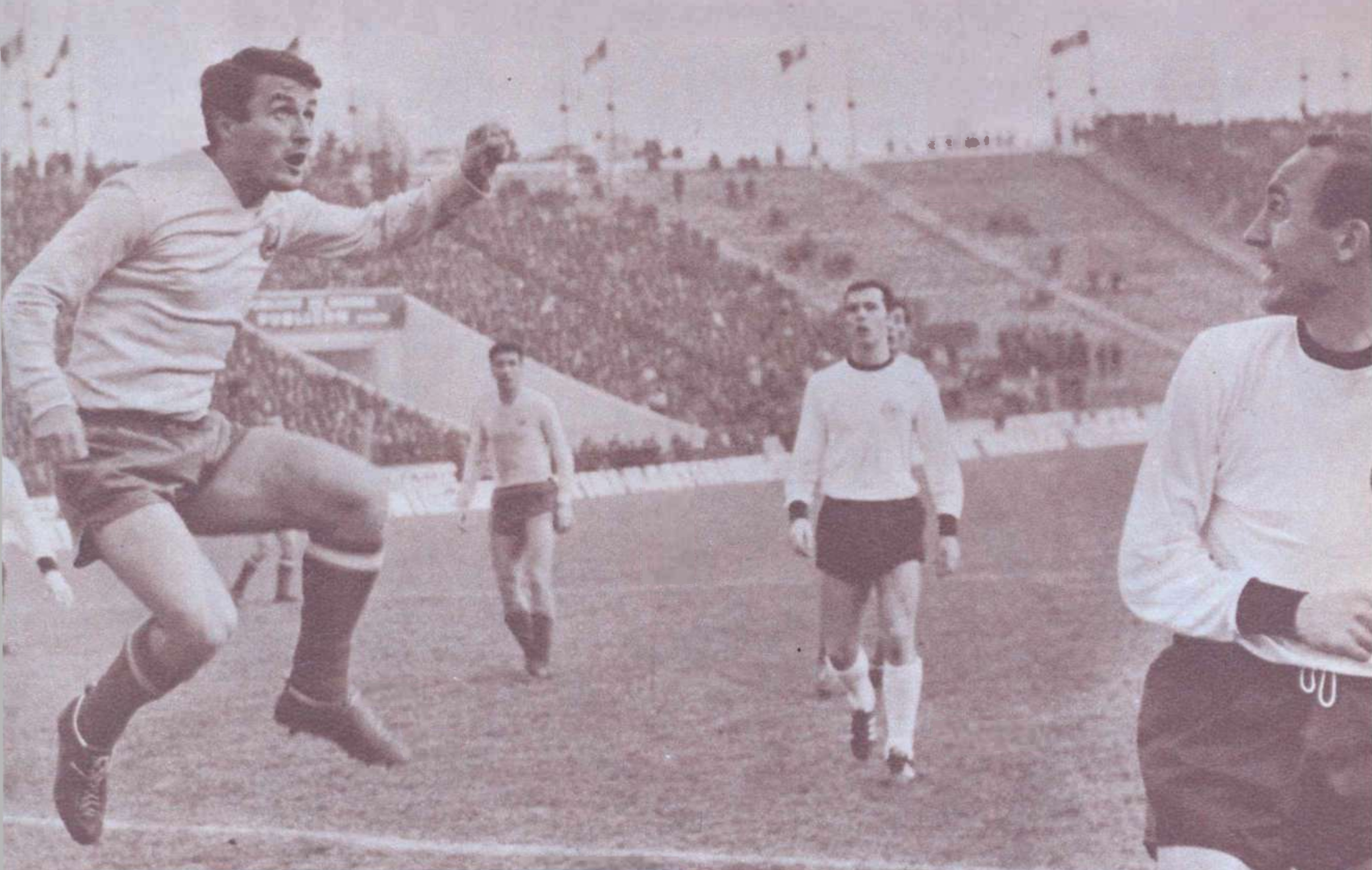
Ionescu (on the left) in a friendly match against West Germany in 1967, which Romania won 1–0. Franz Beckenbauer is pictured in the center

Ionescu played 15 games for Romania, making his debut on 23 December 1962 when coach Silviu Ploeșteanu sent him at half-time to replace Cicerone Manolache in a 3–1 friendly loss to Morocco. His next three matches were in the 1966 World Cup qualifiers. In a friendly against Greece that ended with a 2–1 victory, Ionescu scored his first two goals for the national team. His following three games were in the Euro 1968 qualifiers in which he scored a double in a 7–0 victory against Cyprus.

Ionescu's last appearance for the national team was a 2–2 draw against Greece in the 1970 World Cup qualifiers. He also played nine games for Romania's Olympic team, being chosen by coach Ploeșteanu to be part of the 1964 Summer Olympics squad in Tokyo where he played four games and scored one goal in a 3–1 victory against Mexico, helping the team finish in fifth place.

=== International goals ===
Scores and results list Romania's goal tally first, score column indicates score after each Ionescu goal.

List of international goals scored by Ion Ionescu
#	Date	Venue	Cap	Opponent	Score	Result	Competition
1	8 March 1967	Leoforos Alexandras Stadium, Athens, Greece	7	Greece	1–1	2–1	Friendly
2	8 March 1967	Leoforos Alexandras Stadium, Athens, Greece	7	Greece	2–1	2–1	Friendly
3	23 April 1967	23 August Stadium, Bucharest, Romania	8	Cyprus	4–0	7–0	Euro 1968 qualifiers
4	23 April 1967	23 August Stadium, Bucharest, Romania	8	Cyprus	7–0	7–0	Euro 1968 qualifiers

== Managerial career ==
In the winter of 1973, Ionescu was appointed head coach of second-tier club Șoimii Sibiu but failed to guide them to promotion to the first division. From 1975 to 1976, he had a tenure at CSM Suceava. In 1977, he coached Divizia B side Gloria Buzău, guiding them to promotion to Divizia A by the season's end. He then coached the team throughout the entire 1978–79 season and helped them avoid relegation. Between 1980 and 1984, Ionescu had stints at Rapid București, CSM Suceava and FC Constanța. Afterwards, he retired from coaching to work as a lawyer and, for a brief period, as a judge.

== Personal life ==
Sports commentator Ilie Dobre wrote a book about him titled Ion Ionescu între "templul" Giuleștiului și cel al justiției (Ion Ionescu between the "temple" of Giulești and that of justice), which was released in 2002.

== Honours ==
=== Player ===
Rapid București

- Divizia A: 1966–67
- Cupa României runner-up: 1960–61, 1961–62, 1967–68

Alemannia Aachen

- Bundesliga runner-up: 1968–69

Cercle Brugge

- Belgian Second Division: 1970–71

=== Manager ===
Gloria Buzău

- Divizia B: 1977–78

Individual

- Total matches played in Divizia A: 184 matches – 107 goals
- Top-scorer of Divizia A: 1962–63, 1965–66
- Romanian Footballer of the Year fourth place: 1967
