= Constantin Iancu (footballer) =

Romanian footballer (1940–2000)

Personal information
- Date of birth: 26 August 1940
- Place of birth: Bucharest, Romania
- Date of death: 2000 (aged 60)
- Place of death: Sweden
- Position: Forward

Senior career*
Years	Team	Apps	(Gls)
1958–1961	Flacăra Roșie București		
1961–1962	Dinamo Obor București		
1962–1963	Dinamo Bacău		
1963–1964	Politehnica Iași		
1964–1965	Progresul București		
1965–1969	Farul Constanța		
1970–1971	Argeș Pitești		
1971–1973	FC Galați		
1973–1975	Progresul București		

International career
1965–1966	Romania	5	(1)
- * Club domestic league appearances and goals

Constantin Iancu (26 August 1940 – 2000) was a Romanian footballer who played as a forward.

== Club career ==
Iancu, nicknamed "Guță", was born on 26 August 1940 in Bucharest, Romania and grew up in the Dudești neighborhood. He started playing football at local club Flacăra Roșie. In the early 1960s, his talent was noticed by coach Traian Ionescu who wanted to bring him to Dinamo București. However, he did not have a place to play there, as in the offence were players such as Ion Pârcălab, Constantin Frățilă or Ion Haidu. Thus, Iancu was sent to Dinamo Obor București for one year, afterwards going one year to Dinamo Bacău. After another two years spent at Politehnica Iași and Progresul București, Iancu went to play for Farul Constanța where he experienced the longest and most prolific spell of his career. However, in 1969 after scoring the only goal in a 1–0 Divizia A home victory against Dinamo București, he was arrested shortly after the game ended. One year before his arrest, he was accused of causing a scandal, disturbing the peace, and attempted rape when he was with Farul in a training camp at Poiana Brașov. Due to a lack of evidence, the authorities closed the case but it was re-opened after that match. It was suspected that behind this arrest was Dinamo, who had connections with the Internal Affairs Ministry, but this hypothesis was never proven. Iancu was sent to two years in prison and banned for life from playing football. He was released from jail after one year and asked the authorities for permission to play football again, which was granted to him. He then played one year for Argeș Pitești and two years for FC Galați in Divizia B, concluding his career at Progresul after a mid-1970s decree banned players with criminal records from football.

== International career ==
Iancu played five matches and scored one goal for Romania, making his debut under coach Ilie Oană on 13 June 1965 in a 2–1 away loss to Portugal in the 1966 World Cup qualifiers. In the following game he scored his first and only goal for the national team in a 1–0 victory in a friendly against Uruguay. Iancu's last appearance for Romania was in a friendly that ended with a 2–1 away victory against Israel.

=== International goals ===
Scores and results list Romania's goal tally first. "Score" column indicates the score after the player's goal.

#	Date	Venue	Opponent	Score	Result	Competition
1.	19 June 1966	Stadionul 23 August, București, Romania	Uruguay	1–0	1–0	Friendly

== Death ==
In the 1980s, Iancu emigrated to relatives he had in Sweden where he died in 2000 at age 60.
