= Pamboullis Papadopoulos =

Cypriot footballer (born 1947)

Personal information
- Full name: Charalambos Papadopoulos
- Date of birth: 26 May 1947 (age 79)
- Place of birth: Cyprus
- Position: Midfielder

Senior career*
Years	Team	Apps	(Gls)
1964–1970	AEL Limassol		
1970–1976	Olympiacos	88	(30)
1976–1978	OFI		
1978	Toronto Metros-Croatia	8	(1)
1978–1981	AEL Limassol		

International career
1965–1979	Cyprus	25	(2)
- * Club domestic league appearances and goals

Charalambos "Pambos" Papadopoulos (Greek: Χαράλαμπος "Πάμπος" Παπαδόπουλος; born 26 May 1947), better known as Pamboullis Papadopoulos (Greek: Παμπουλής Παπαδόπουλος), is a Cypriot former footballer who played as a midfielder and made 25 appearances for the Cyprus national team.

== Career ==
Papadopoulos made his debut for Cyprus on 20 March 1965 in a friendly match against Lebanon, which finished as a 2–0 win. He went on to make 25 appearances, scoring 2 goals, before making his last appearance on 9 December 1979 in a UEFA Euro 1980 qualifying match against Spain, which finished as a 1–3 loss.

== Career statistics ==
=== International ===
Cyprus
Year	Apps	Goals
1965	5	0
1966	1	0
1967	2	0
1968	2	1
1969	1	0
1970	2	0
1971	3	0
1972	2	0
1973	2	0
1974	1	1
1975	1	0
1978	1	0
1979	2	0
Total	25	2

=== International goals ===
No.	Date	Venue	Opponent	Score	Result	Competition
1	17 February 1968	GSP Stadium, Nicosia, Cyprus	Switzerland	2–1	2–1	UEFA Euro 1968 qualifying
2	15 November 1974	Karaiskakis Stadium, Piraeus, Greece	Greece	1–0	1–3	Friendly
