= Vasile Ștefan =

Romanian footballer

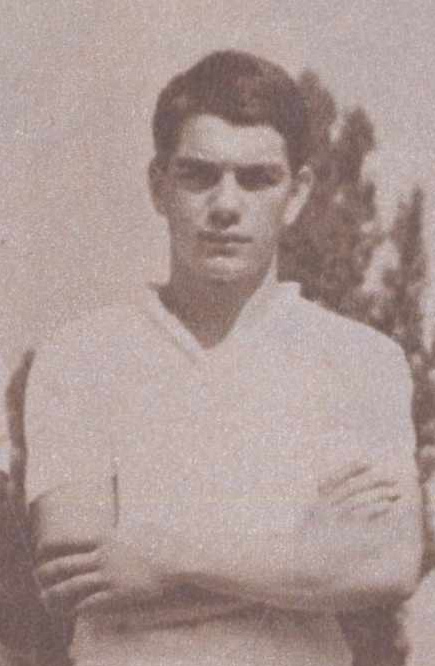

Personal information
- Date of birth: 23 October 1948 (age 78)
- Place of birth: Romania
- Height: 1.72 m (5 ft 8 in)
- Position: Central defender

Senior career*
Years	Team	Apps	(Gls)
1965–1973	Rapid București	63	(0)
- * Club domestic league appearances and goals

Vasile Ștefan (born 23 October 1948) is a Romanian former footballer who played as a defender.

== Honours ==
Rapid București

- Divizia A: 1966–67
- Cupa României: 1971–72, runner-up 1967–68
