= 1968 Cupa României final =

- Event: 1967–68 Cupa României
Dinamo București	Rapid București
3	1
- Date: 16 June 1968
- Venue: 23 August, Bucharest
- Referee: Vasile Dumitrescu (Bucharest)
- Attendance: 30,000

The 1968 Cupa României final was the 30th final of Romania's most prestigious football cup competition. It was disputed between Dinamo București and Rapid București, and was won by Dinamo București after a game with 4 goals after extra time. Alexandru Neagu failed a penalty in 90 minutes for Rapid București. It was the 3rd cup for Dinamo București.

== Match details ==
16 June 1968
17:30 EET

Dinamo București	3–1 (a.e.t.)	Rapid București
Dumitrache 78'; Lucescu 115', 116'	Report	Năsturescu 70'

23 August, Bucharest
Attendance: 30,000
Referee: Vasile Dumitrescu (Bucharest)

GK	1	(Romania) Spiridon Niculescu
DF	2	(Romania) Cornel Popa
DF	3	(Romania) Ion Nunweiller
DF	4	(Romania) Cornel Dinu
DF	5	(Romania) Constantin Ștefan
MF	6	(Romania) Vasile Gergely
MF	7	(Romania) Mircea Stoenescu
FW	8	(Romania) Ion Pârcălab
FW	9	(Romania) Nicolae Nagy (substituted off) 77'
FW	10	(Romania) Florea Dumitrache
FW	11	(Romania) Ion Haidu
Substitutions:
MF	12	(Romania) Mircea Lucescu (substituted in) 77'
Manager:
(Romania) Bazil Marian

GK	1	(Romania) Răducanu Necula
DF	2	(Romania) Nicolae Lupescu
DF	3	(Romania) Ion Motroc
DF	4	(Romania) Dan Coe
DF	5	(Romania) Ilie Greavu
MF	6	(Romania) Ion Dumitru
MF	7	(Romania) Constantin Jamaischi
FW	8	(Romania) Constantin Năsturescu
FW	9	(Romania) Alexandru Neagu
FW	10	(Romania) Ion Ionescu (substituted off) 68'
FW	11	(Romania) Teofil Codreanu
Substitutions:
FW	12	(Romania) Marian Petreanu (substituted in) 68'
Manager:
(Romania) Valentin Stănescu

== See also ==
- List of Cupa României finals
