= Florea Martinovici =

Romanian footballer (1940–2011)

Personal information
- Date of birth: 19 April 1940
- Place of birth: Băilești, Romania
- Date of death: 16 June 2011 (aged 71)
- Position: Winger

Youth career
- 1954–1959: Metalul Bocșa

Senior career*
Years	Team	Apps	(Gls)
1959–1960	Șoimii Timișoara		
1960–1961	Metalul Bocșa		
1961–1967	Jiul Petroșani	132	(24)
1967–1972	Universitatea Craiova	99	(5)
1972–1974	Minerul Motru	38	(0)
Total		269	(29)

International career
1967–1968	Romania	2	(1)
- * Club domestic league appearances and goals as of 26 January 2020

Florea Martinovici (19 April 1940 – 16 June 2011) was a Romanian footballer who played as a winger.

== Club career ==
Martinovici was born on 19 April 1940 in Băilești, Romania and began playing football in 1954 at local club Metalul. In 1959 he moved to Șoimii Timișoara, but after one year he returned to Metalul. In 1961 he joined Jiul Petroșani where he made his Divizia A debut on 27 August under coach Bazil Marian in a 1–0 away victory against UTA Arad in which he scored the goal. The team was relegated at the end of his first season. He stayed with the club, helping it get promoted back to the first league at the end of the 1965–66 season. In 1967, Martinovici went to Universitatea Craiova. There, he made his only two appearances in European competitions in the 4–2 aggregate loss to Pécsi Dózsa in the first round of the 1970–71 Inter-Cities Fairs Cup. On 12 December 1971, he made his last Divizia A appearance in Craiova's 2–0 home win over Farul Constanța, totaling 142 matches with 13 goals in the competition. In 1972 he joined Minerul Motru in Divizia C, helping them gain promotion to the second league after one year. Subsequently, Martinovici ended his career after playing 12 games during the 1973–74 Divizia B season.

== International career ==
Martinovici was the first Universitatea Craiova player who played for Romania's national team. He made his debut on 23 April 1967 under coach Ilie Oană in a 7–0 victory against Cyprus in the Euro 1968 qualifiers in which he scored a goal. Subsequently, he made one more appearance for the national team in a 2–0 victory against Switzerland during the 1970 World Cup qualifiers.

=== International goals ===
Scores and results list Romania's goal tally first, score column indicates score after each Martinovici goal.

List of international goals scored by Florea Martinovici
Goal	Date	Venue	Opponent	Score	Result	Competition
2	23 April 1967	Stadionul 23 August, Bucharest, Romania	Cyprus	2–0	7–0	Euro 1968 qualifiers

== Death ==
Martinovici died on 16 June 2011 at age 71.

== Honours ==
Jiul Petroșani

- Divizia B: 1965–66

Minerul Motru

- Divizia C: 1972–73
