= Nicolae Georgescu =

Romanian footballer

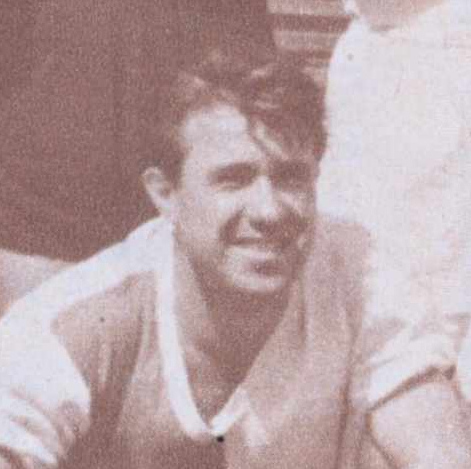
- Georgescu with Rapid București in 1963.

Personal information
- Date of birth: 1 January 1936
- Place of birth: Câmpina, Romania
- Date of death: 22 August 1983 (aged 47)
- Height: 1.73 m (5 ft 8 in)
- Position: Attacking midfielder

Youth career
- 1950–1953: Rafinăria Câmpina

Senior career*
Years	Team	Apps	(Gls)
1954	Voința București		
1955	Progresul CPCS București		
1956–1968	Rapid București	211	(46)
1968–1970	Poiana Câmpina		

International career
1955–1965	Romania (Note: Including five appearances and two goals for Romania's Olympic team.)	18	(9)
- * Club domestic league appearances and goals

Nicolae Georgescu (1 January 1936 – 22 August 1983) was a Romanian footballer who played as an attacking midfielder. Spending most of his career in Rapid București, he was capped 18 times for Romania.

== Club career ==
Georgescu was born 1 January 1936 in Câmpina, Romania, and began playing football in 1950 at local club Rafinăria. In 1954 he moved to Voința București in Divizia B, after one year joining Progresul CPCS București in the same league. On 25 March 1956 he made his Divizia A debut, playing for Rapid București under coach Ferenc Rónay in a 0–0 draw against Locomotiva Timișoara. Georgescu spent 10 seasons at Rapid, helping the club win the 1966–67 Divizia A, which was the first title in its history, being used by coach Valentin Stănescu in six matches. He also reached two Cupa României finals in 1961 and 1962 under coach Ion Mihăilescu which were lost to Arieșul Turda against whom he scored a goal, and Steaua București respectively. Subsequently, he helped the club win two Balkans Cups in 1964 and 1966. Georgescu made his last Divizia A appearance on 2 October 1966 in a 2–1 away loss to Dinamo București, totaling 211 appearances with 46 goals in the competition, all of them for Rapid. He retired after playing two more seasons for his hometown club, Poiana Câmpina in Divizia B.

== International career ==
Georgescu played 13 matches and scored seven goals for Romania, making his debut on 29 May 1955 under coach Gheorghe Popescu in a 2–2 friendly draw against Poland in which he scored the last goal of the match. His last three appearances for the national team were in the 1966 World Cup qualifiers, being the team's captain in two of them and scoring a goal in each leg against Turkey. He also played for Romania's Olympic team, being chosen by coach Silviu Ploeșteanu to be part of the 1964 Summer Olympics squad in Tokyo where he played two games, helping the team finish in fifth place.

=== International goals ===
Scores and results list Romania's goal tally first. "Score" column indicates the score after each Nicolae Georgescu goal.

#	Date	Venue	Opponent	Score	Result	Competition
1.	29 May 1955	Stadionul 23 August, Bucharest, Romania	Poland	2–2	2–2	Friendly
2.	15 June 1955	Ullevi Stadion, Gothenburg, Sweden	Sweden	1–4	1–4	Friendly
3.	18 September 1955	Stadionul 23 August, Bucharest, Romania	East Germany	1–0	2–3	Friendly
4.	28 September 1955	Stadionul 23 August, Bucharest, Romania	Belgium	1–0	1–0	Friendly
5.	9 October 1955	Stadionul 23 August, Bucharest, Romania	Bulgaria	1–0	1–1	Friendly
6.	2 May 1965	Stadionul 23 August, Bucharest, Romania	Turkey	1–0	3–0	1966 World Cup qualifiers
7.	23 October 1965	19 Mayıs Stadium, Ankara, Turkey	Turkey	1–2	1–2	1966 World Cup qualifiers

== Personal life and death ==
Georgescu's daughter Monica was a basketball player. His nephew, Gabriel Manu was a football player and current coach.

Georgescu died on 22 August 1983, at the age of 47.

== Honours ==
Rapid București

- Divizia A: 1966–67
- Cupa României runner-up: 1960–61, 1961–62
- Balkans Cup: 1963–64, 1964–66
