= Constantin Frățilă =

Romanian footballer (1942–2016)

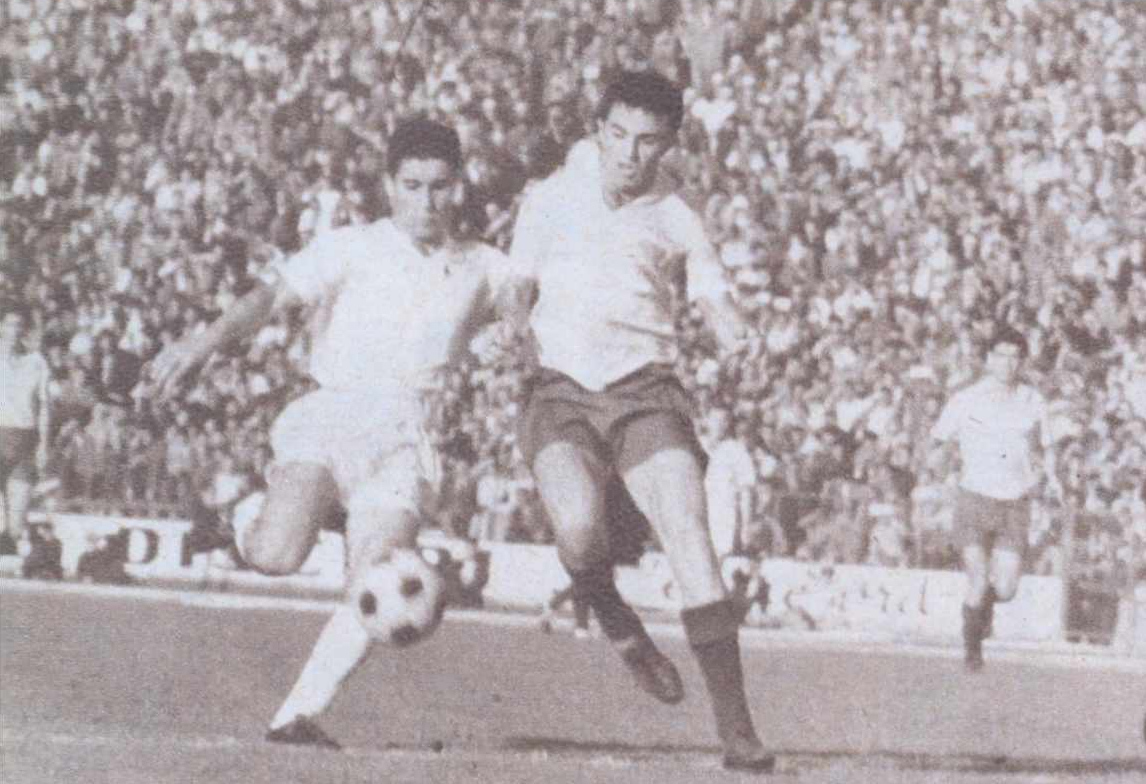
- Frățilă (left) and Petescu in a derby match (1963)

Personal information
- Date of birth: 1 October 1942
- Place of birth: Bucharest, Romania
- Date of death: 21 October 2016 (aged 74)
- Place of death: Bucharest, Romania
- Height: 1.70 m (5 ft 7 in)
- Position: Striker

Youth career
- 1957–1958: Recolta București
- 1958–1960: Uzinele Vasile Roaită

Senior career*
Years	Team	Apps	(Gls)
1960–1970	Dinamo București	168	(74)
1970–1972	Argeș Pitești	46	(20)
1972–1973	Sportul Studențesc București	2	(0)
1973–1974	Omonia Nicosia		
1974	Chimia Râmnicu Vâlcea	5	(1)
1975	Sirena București		
Total		219	(95)

International career
1966–1967	Romania	7	(7)

Managerial career
- 1982: Dinamo Victoria București
- 1984–1985: FC Baia Mare
- * Club domestic league appearances and goals

Constantin Frățilă (1 October 1942 – 21 October 2016) was a Romanian football player and coach who played as a striker.

== Club career ==
Frățilă was born on 1 October 1942 in Bucharest, Romania and began playing football in 1957 at local club Recolta, and after one year, he moved to Uzinele Vasile Roaită. He started his senior career playing for Dinamo București, making his Divizia A debut on 16 April 1961 under coach Traian Ionescu in a 6–0 victory against Minerul Lupeni in which he scored a hat-trick. He scored a total of seven goals in seven appearances until the end of his first season spent at the club.

In the following four seasons, Frățilă helped The Red Dogs win four consecutive Divizia A titles from 1962 until 1965. In the first one he worked with three coaches, Ionescu, Constantin Teașcă and Nicolae Dumitru, who gave him 19 appearances in which he scored five goals. In the following two Dumitru and Ionescu used him in 15 matches in which he netted nine times in the first and in 26 games with 19 goals scored in the second which made him the league top-scorer alongside Cornel Pavlovici. In the last one he played 23 matches, finding the net 11 times under the guidance of Angelo Niculescu. Years later after this performance he said:"Winning four consecutive titles in Liga I is, without a doubt, an important achievement. I am proud to have achieved this with Dinamo."

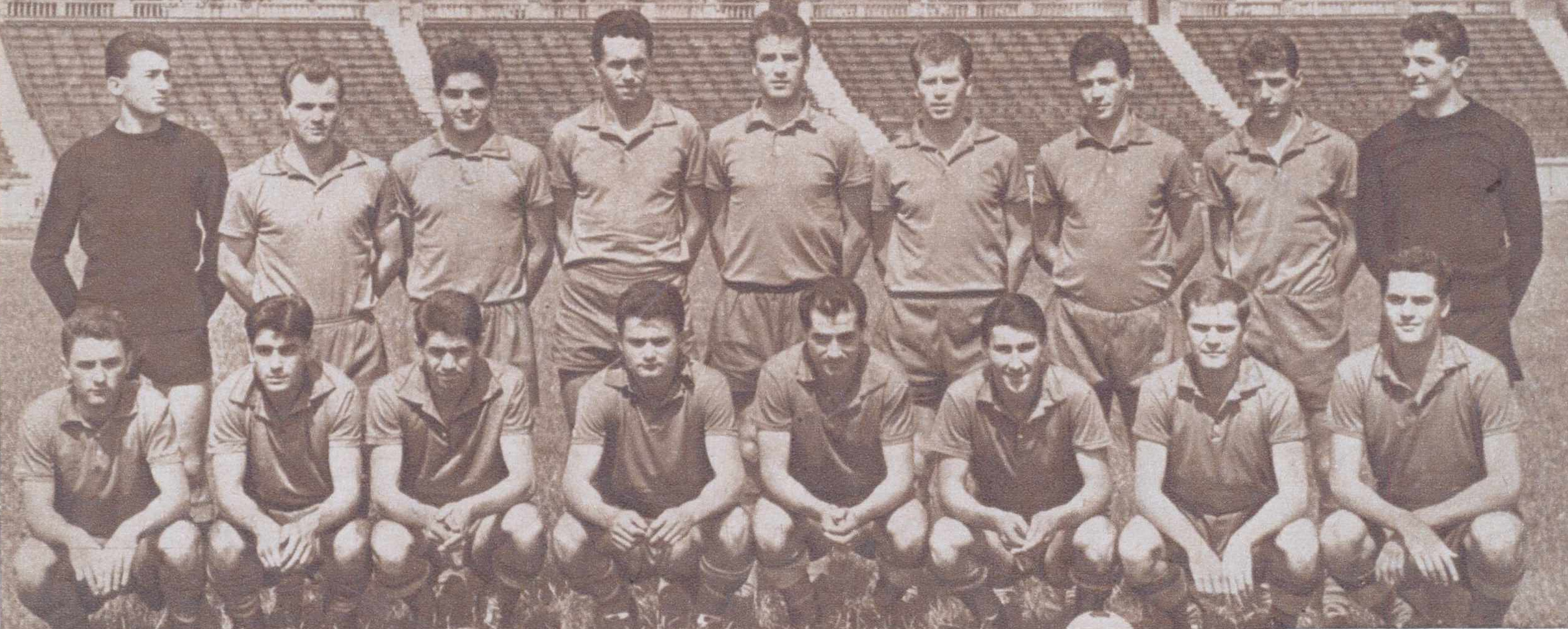
Frățilă (bottom row, third from right) with Dinamo București in 1963.

Frățilă also won two Cupa României with Dinamo. In the 1964 final, coach Ionescu played him for the entire match, and he scored a goal in their 5–3 victory over rivals Steaua București, but in the 1968 final, coach Bazil Marian did not use him in the 3–1 win against Rapid București. Frățilă played in 11 European Cup matches in which he scored seven goals and one game in the UEFA Cup Winners' Cup. In the 1963–64 European Cup campaign, he helped Dinamo get past East Germany champion, Motor Jena, being eliminated in the next phase by Real Madrid against whom he scored a goal in a 5–3 loss. In the 1965–66 edition he scored two goals against Denmark's champion, Boldklubben 1909 which helped Dinamo advance to the next round. There, they were eliminated by the winners of the previous two seasons of the competition, Inter Milan, but he scored a goal in the historical 2–1 victory in the first leg, after which he said:"I scored a goal against Inter, can you believe it? I scored against the best defense in the world. It is the biggest satisfaction of my life". During his 10 seasons spent at Dinamo, Frățilă scored six league goals in the derby against Steaua, including a brace in a 3–2 victory. However, in a 1967 Bucharest Cup match against them he suffered an injury which kept him off the field for a year and a half.

In 1970 he went to play for Argeș Pitești where in his second season he helped them win the Divizia A title, contributing with seven goals scored in the 17 matches coaches Titus Ozon and Florin Halagian used him. After spending one season at Sportul Studențesc București, he went to play in Cyprus in the 1973–74 season alongside compatriot Mihai Mocanu, winning the title and the cup. Frățilă returned to Romania at Chimia Râmnicu Vâlcea where he made his last Divizia A appearance on 20 November 1974 in a 1–0 victory against Sportul Studențesc, totaling 221 matches with 95 goals in the competition. He ended his career in 1975 at Divizia C team, Sirena București.

== International career ==
Frățilă played seven games in which he scored seven goals for Romania, making his debut under coach Ilie Oană on 2 November 1966 in a 4–2 victory in which he scored a hat-trick against Switzerland in the Euro 1968 qualifiers. He played two more games in the same qualifiers, scoring a double in a 5–1 win over Cyprus. Frățilă made his last appearance for the national team on 22 March 1967 in a 2–1 friendly victory against France, where he netted a goal.

== Managerial career ==
Frățilă started coaching in 1976 at Dinamo București's center of children and juniors. Afterwards he coached senior team Dinamo Victoria București, helping them earn promotion to Divizia B in the 1981–82 season. Then he worked at FC Baia Mare, leading them through the 1984–85 Divizia A season.

== Death ==
Frățilă died on 21 October 2016 at age 74.

== Playing statistics ==
Scores and results list Romania's goal tally first. "Score" column indicates the score after each Constantin Frățilă goal.

#	Date	Venue	Opponent	Score	Result	Competition
1.	2 November 1966	Stadionul Republicii, București, Romania	Switzerland	2–0	4–2	Euro 1968 qualifiers
2.	2 November 1966	Stadionul Republicii, București, Romania	Switzerland	3–0	4–2	Euro 1968 qualifiers
3.	2 November 1966	Stadionul Republicii, București, Romania	Switzerland	4–0	4–2	Euro 1968 qualifiers
4.	17 November 1966	Stadionul Petrolul, Ploiești, Romania	Poland	3–0	4–3	Friendly
5.	3 December 1966	GSP Stadium, Nicosia, Cyprus	Cyprus	3–1	5–1	Euro 1968 qualifiers
6.	3 December 1966	GSP Stadium, Nicosia, Cyprus	Cyprus	4–1	5–1	Euro 1968 qualifiers
7.	22 March 1967	Parc des Princes, Paris, France	France	1–0	2–1	Friendly

== Honours ==
=== Player ===
Dinamo București

- Divizia A: 1961–62, 1962–63, 1963–64, 1964–65
- Cupa României: 1963–64, 1967–68

Argeș Pitești

- Divizia A: 1971–72

Omonia Nicosia

- Cypriot League: 1973–74
- Cypriot Cup: 1973–74

Individual

- Divizia A top scorer: 1963–64 (joint with Cornel Pavlovici)

=== Manager ===
Dinamo Victoria București

- Divizia C: 1981–82
