= UEFA Euro 1968 qualifying Group 6 =

Football tournament qualifying stage

Group 6 of the UEFA Euro 1968 qualifying tournament was one of the eight groups to decide which teams would qualify for the UEFA Euro 1968 finals tournament. Group 6 consisted of four teams: Italy, Romania, Switzerland, and Cyprus, where they played against each other home-and-away in a round-robin format. The group winners were Italy, who finished 5 points above Romania.

== Final table ==
| Pos | Team | Pld | W | D | L | GF | GA | GD | Pts | Qualification | (Italy) | (Romania) | (Switzerland) | (Cyprus) |
|---|---|---|---|---|---|---|---|---|---|---|---|---|---|---|
| 1 | Italy | 6 | 5 | 1 | 0 | 17 | 3 | +14 | 11 | Advance to quarter-finals | — | 3–1 | 4–0 | 5–0 |
| 2 | Romania | 6 | 3 | 0 | 3 | 18 | 14 | +4 | 6 | | 0–1 | — | 4–2 | 7–0 |
| 3 | Switzerland | 6 | 2 | 1 | 3 | 17 | 13 | +4 | 5 | | 2–2 | 7–1 | — | 5–0 |
| 4 | Cyprus | 6 | 1 | 0 | 5 | 3 | 25 | −22 | 2 | | 0–2 | 1–5 | 2–1 | — |

Source: UEFA
Rules for classification: Qualification tiebreakers

== Matches ==
2 November 1966
14:45

| Romania | 4–2 | Switzerland |
|---|---|---|
| Dridea 8'; Frățilă 11', 25', 38' | Report | Künzli 54'; Odermatt 70' |

Stadionul Republicii, Bucharest
Attendance: 14,209
Referee: James Finney (England)

26 November 1966
14:30

| Italy | 3–1 | Romania |
|---|---|---|
| Mazzola 30', 67'; De Paoli 43' | Report | Dobrin 7' |

Stadio San Paolo, Naples
Attendance: 68,145
Referee: Gerhard Schulenburg (West Germany)

3 December 1966
14:30

| Cyprus | 1–5 | Romania |
|---|---|---|
| Pierides 31' | Report | Dridea 49', 82'; Lucescu 51'; Frățilă 65', 74' |

GSP Stadium, Nicosia
Attendance: 4,823
Referee: Arthur Lentini (Malta)

22 March 1967
15:45

| Cyprus | 0–2 | Italy |
|---|---|---|
| | Report | Domenghini 76'; Facchetti 88' |

GSP Stadium, Nicosia
Attendance: 5,380
Referee: Atanas Stavrev Kiryakov (Bulgaria)

23 April 1967
16:30

| Romania | 7–0 | Cyprus |
|---|---|---|
| Lucescu 4'; Martinovici 15'; Dumitriu 24', 52', 77'; I. Ionescu 47', 86' | Report |

Stadionul 23. August, Bucharest
Attendance: 9,412
Referee: Milivoje Gugulović (Yugoslavia)

24 May 1967
20:00

| Switzerland | 7–1 | Romania |
|---|---|---|
| Künzli 12', 66'; Quentin 15', 32'; Blättler 47', 59'; Odermatt 63' | Report | Dobrin 70' |

Hardturm Stadion, Zürich
Attendance: 21,337
Referee: Robert Lacoste (France)

25 June 1967
17:30

| Romania | 0–1 | Italy |
|---|---|---|
| | Report | Bertini 81' |

Stadionul 23. August, Bucharest
Attendance: 54,371
Referee: Manuel Gómez Arribas (Spain)

1 November 1967
14:30

| Italy | 5–0 | Cyprus |
|---|---|---|
| Mazzola 12', 22'; Riva 46', 55', 59' | Report |

Stadio San Vito, Cosenza
Attendance: 22,059
Referee: Antoine Queudeville (Luxembourg)

8 November 1967
20:30

| Switzerland | 5–0 | Cyprus |
|---|---|---|
| Blättler 30', 55'; Künzli 41'; Dürr 56' (pen.); Odermatt 72' | Report |

Stadio Comunale di Cornaredo, Lugano
Attendance: 3,737
Referee: Robert Schaut (Belgium)

18 November 1967
14:45

| Switzerland | 2–2 | Italy |
|---|---|---|
| Quentin 34'; Künzli 68' | Report | Riva 66', 85' (pen.) |

Wankdorf Stadium, Bern
Attendance: 53,137
Referee: István Zsolt (Hungary)

23 December 1967
14:30

| Italy | 4–0 | Switzerland |
|---|---|---|
| Mazzola 3'; Riva 13'; Domenghini 45', 67' | Report |

Stadio Amsicora, Cagliari
Attendance: 24,743
Referee: Tiny Wharton (Scotland)

17 February 1968
15:15

| Cyprus | 2–1 | Switzerland |
|---|---|---|
| Asprou 22'; Papadopoulos 46' | Report | Panagiotou 9' (o.g.) |

GSP Stadium, Nicosia
Attendance: 7,500
Referee: Pavel Špoták (Czechoslovakia)

== Goalscorers ==
There were 55 goals scored in 12 matches, for an average of 4.58 goals per match.

6 goals

- (Italy) Luigi Riva

5 goals

- (Italy) Sandro Mazzola
- (Romania) Constantin Frățilă
- (Switzerland) Fritz Künzli

4 goals

- (Switzerland) Rolf Blättler

3 goals

- (Italy) Angelo Domenghini
- (Romania) Mircea Dridea
- (Romania) Emil Dumitriu
- (Switzerland) Karl Odermatt
- (Switzerland) René-Pierre Quentin

2 goals

- (Romania) Nicolae Dobrin
- (Romania) Ion Ionescu
- (Romania) Mircea Lucescu

1 goal

- (Cyprus) Melis Asprou
- (Cyprus) Pamboullis Papadopoulos
- (Cyprus) Kostakis Pierides
- (Italy) Mario Bertini
- (Italy) Virginio De Paoli
- (Italy) Giacinto Facchetti
- (Romania) Florea Martinovici
- (Switzerland) Richard Dürr

1 own goal

- (Cyprus) Kostas Panayiotou (against Switzerland)
