= Kostas Panayiotou =

Cypriot footballer (1937–2014)

Personal information
- Full name: Konstantinos Panayiotou
- Date of birth: 1937
- Place of birth: Larnaca, Cyprus
- Date of death: 17 June 2014 (aged 77)
- Place of death: Nicosia, Cyprus
- Position: Defender

Senior career*
Years	Team	Apps	(Gls)
1959–1970	Omonia	244	(15)
Total		244	(15)

International career
1960–1969	Cyprus	19	(0)
- * Club domestic league appearances and goals

Konstantinos "Kostas" Panayiotou (Greek: Κωνσταντίνος "Κώστα" Παναγιώτου; 1937 – 17 June 2014) was a Cypriot footballer who played as a defender and made 19 appearances for the Cyprus national team.

== Career ==
Early in his career, Panayiotou played for various amateur English clubs before joining Leyton Orient on trial. In 1959, after returning to Cyprus, he joined Omonia where he remained until his retirement in 1970.

Panayiotou made his debut for Cyprus on 13 November 1960 in a friendly match against Israel, Cyprus' first official international match, which finished as a 1–1 draw. He went on to make 19 appearances before making his last appearance on 19 April 1969 in a 1970 FIFA World Cup qualification match against Austria, which finished as a 1–2 loss. Costas Panagiotou played football until 1971. He played with Omonia Nicosia for 12 consecutive years. He played in 244 games and celebrated winning two championships, a Cup and a Shield. Costas played with the Cyprus National Team in 18 games. After Omonia, he played for Orpheus and even helped as a central hunter. He could play in a team abroad, Greece or UK and get a fortune, but he did not want to leave the team he loved. For his rich performance in football, Costas was honored in 1966-67 and in 1967-68 as the best football player. Admittedly Costas is one of the top central defenders in the history of Cypriot football.

== Personal life ==
Costas was born in 1937 in Larnaca to a poor family. From an early age he played football in the neighborhoods and fields. In search of a better life, his family immigrated to London in 1950. Costas played in various amateur teams, until he ended up in Leighton Orient, a first division team at the time in the English championship. As he was about to join the group, he was suddenly informed that he had been selected for military service in the British army. The news upset him and he decided to leave England and in 1959 he returned to Cyprus and joined Omonia Nicosia. Costas plays in the team and impresses with his appearances, justifying the fame that accompanied him.

He was married to Zoe Kathitzioti with whom he had two daughters.

He died on 17 June 2014 at the age of 77.

== "Costas of Omonia" ==
An ascendant in our stadiums, an inspired leader as the libero of “Clovers”. He stood out for his strength, fighting spirit and professionalism, and for his ethos. Throughout his career, he was accompanied by the designation "the unbeatable". It is characteristic that in the 1960-61 season, he scored 13 times in the league, while his respective coaches promoted him in the attack when there was a need for a goal.

== Career statistics ==
=== International ===
Cyprus
Year	Apps	Goals
1960	2	0
1963	1	0
1965	5	0
1966	1	0
1967	4	0
1968	4	0
1969	2	0
Total	19	0
