= 1966 FIFA World Cup qualification – UEFA Group 4 =

Football tournament

The four teams in this group played against each other on a home-and-away basis. The winner Portugal qualified for the 1966 FIFA World Cup held in England.

== Standings ==
Pos	Team	Pld	W	D	L	GF	GA	GD	Pts	Qualification	(Portugal national football team)	(Czechoslovakia national football team)	(Romania national football team)	(Turkey national football team)
1	Portugal	6	4	1	1	9	4	+5	9	Qualification for 1966 FIFA World Cup	—	0–0	2–1	5–1
2	Czechoslovakia	6	3	1	2	12	4	+8	7		0–1	—	3–1	3–1
3	Romania	6	3	0	3	9	7	+2	6		2–0	1–0	—	3–0
4	Turkey	6	1	0	5	4	19	−15	2		0–1	0–6	2–1	—

Source: AllWorldCup
Rules for classification: Tiebreakers

== Matches ==
24 January 1965

Portugal	5–1	Turkey
Coluna 16'; Eusébio 21', 63', 77'; Graça 52'	Report	Fevzi 33'

Estádio Nacional, Lisbon, Portugal
Attendance: 33,237
Referee: Juan Gardeazábal (Spain)

19 April 1965

Turkey	0–1	Portugal
	Report	Eusébio 59'

19 Mayıs Stadı, Ankara, Turkey
Attendance: 27,625
Referee: Rachid Dachan (Syria)

25 April 1965

Czechoslovakia	0–1	Portugal
	Report	Eusébio 20'

Tehelné Pole (Slovan), Bratislava, Czechoslovakia
Attendance: 56,975
Referee: Atanas Stavrev (Bulgaria)

2 May 1965

Romania	3–0	Turkey
Georgescu 1'; Mateianu 72' (pen.); Creiniceanu 75'	Report

Stadionul 23. August, Bucharest, Romania
Attendance: 31,219
Referee: Paul Schiller (Austria)

30 May 1965

Romania	1–0	Czechoslovakia
Mateianu 34'	Report

Stadionul 23. August, Bucharest, Romania
Attendance: 44,615
Referee: Fritz Köpke (East Germany)

14 June 1965

Portugal	2–1	Romania
Eusébio 14', 39'	Report	Avram 71'

Estádio Nacional, Lisbon, Portugal
Attendance: 45,646
Referee: Michel Kitabdjian (France)

19 September 1965

Czechoslovakia	3–1	Romania
Knebort 3', 66'; Jokl 90'	Report	Coe 23'

Stadión dr. Vacka "Eden" (Slavia), Prague, Czechoslovakia
Attendance: 7,324
Referee: Włodzimierz Storoniak (Poland)

9 October 1965

Turkey	0–6	Czechoslovakia
	Report	Jokl 22', 70'; Knebort 41', 54'; Kvašňák 45'; Kabát 61'

Ali Sami Yen Stadı, Istanbul, Turkey
Attendance: 12,757
Referee: Raoul Righi (Italy)

23 October 1965

Turkey	2–1	Romania
Fevzi 13'; Nedim 48'	Report	Georgescu 55'

19 Mayıs Stadı, Ankara, Turkey
Attendance: 27,364
Referee: Ramiz Pregja (Albania)

31 October 1965

Portugal	0–0	Czechoslovakia
	Report

Estádio das Antas, Porto, Portugal
Attendance: 31,432
Referee: Leo Horn (Netherlands)

21 November 1965

Czechoslovakia	3–1	Turkey
Mráz 3', 15'; Horváth 69'	Report	Ayhan 8'

Za Lužánkami, Brno, Czechoslovakia
Attendance: 3,133
Referee: Lajos Aranyosi (Hungary)

21 November 1965

Romania	2–0	Portugal
Pârcălab 1'; Badea 43'	Report

Stadionul 23. August, Bucharest, Romania
Attendance: 27,532
Referee: Gottfried Dienst (Switzerland)
