= Mircea Petescu =

Romanian footballer and coach

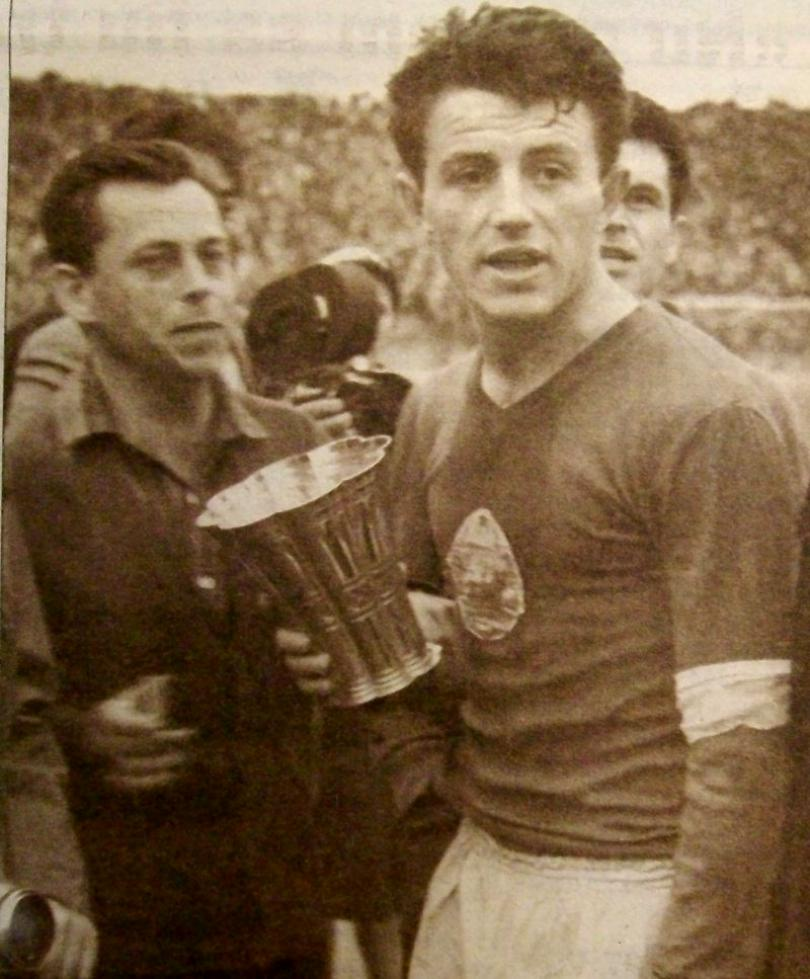
- Petescu in 1962

Personal information
- Full name: Mircea Viorel Petescu
- Date of birth: 15 May 1942
- Place of birth: Pecica, Arad County, Romania
- Date of death: 16 December 2018 (aged 76)
- Place of death: Vosselaar, Belgium
- Height: 1.80 m (5 ft 11 in)
- Position: Defender

Senior career*
Years	Team	Apps	(Gls)
1959–1960	UTA Arad	10	(1)
1960–1963	Știința Timișoara	50	(2)
1962–1963	→ Viitorul București (loan)	14	(0)
1963–1967	Steaua București	80	(1)
1967–1973	UTA Arad	172	(20)
1973–1975	FC Dordrecht		
Total		326	(24)

International career
1964–1968	Romania (Note: Including three appearances for Romania's Olympic team.)	5	(0)

Managerial career
- 1973–1975: FC Dordrecht (assistant)
- 1975–1977: NEC (assistant)
- 1977–1978: Telstar
- 1978–1980: Sparta Rotterdam
- 1981–1982: DS'79
- 1982–1984: 's-Gravenzandse SV
- 1985–1988: Go Ahead Eagles (manager)
- 1988: Go Ahead Eagles (caretaker)
- * Club domestic league appearances and goals

Mircea Viorel Petescu (15 May 1942 – 16 December 2018) was a Romanian professional footballer, coach and sports agent.

== Club career ==
Petescu was born on 15 May 1942 in Pecica, Romania. He made his Divizia A debut on 6 September 1959, playing for UTA Arad under coach Coloman Braun-Bogdan in a 2–2 draw against Steagul Roșu Brașov. After only one season, he joined Știința Timișoara, UTA's rivals, where he spent three years, including half a season on loan at Viitorul București.

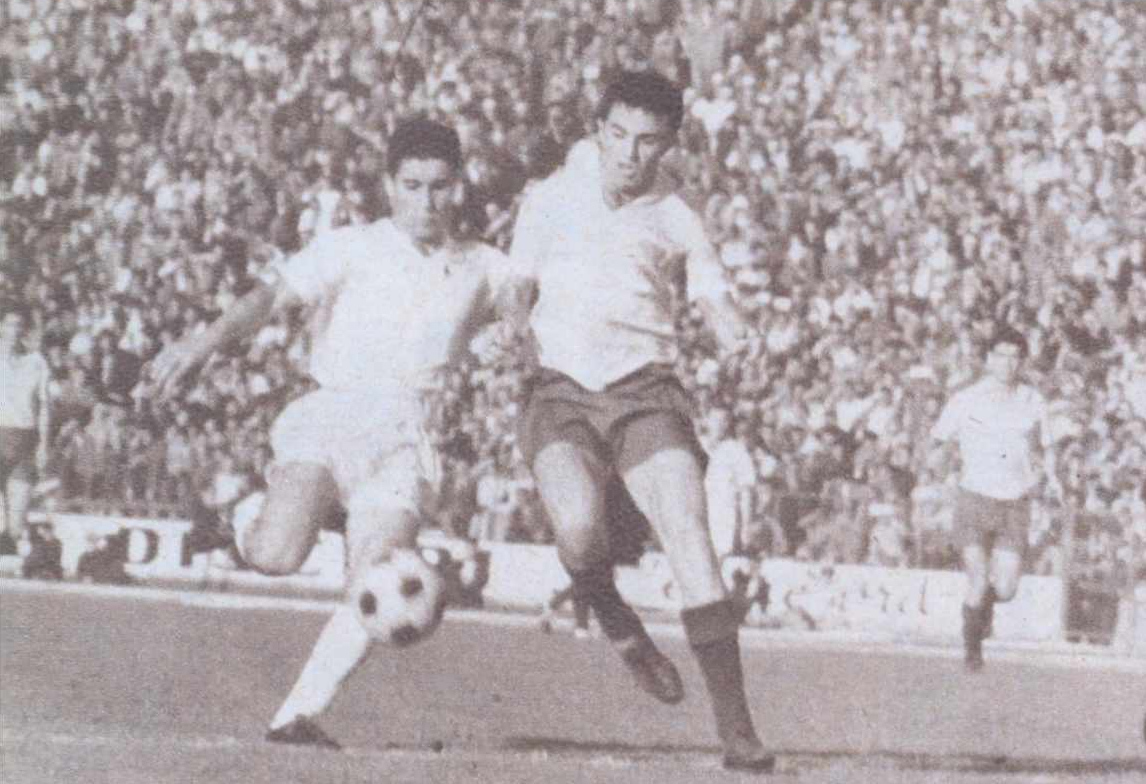
Petescu (right) in a duel with Constantin Frățilă in 1963.

In 1963, Petescu moved to Steaua București, which he helped win two Cupa României in his four seasons at the club. Coach Ilie Savu used him in only one of the finals, the one in 1966 when he played the entire match in the 4–0 win over his former side, UTA.

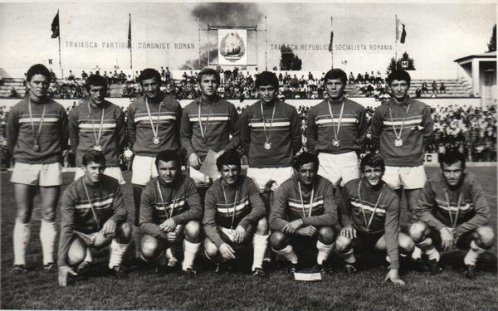
Mircea Petescu (standing, fourth from left) with UTA Arad the champions of Romania in 1970.

In 1967, Petescu returned to UTA, where he played for six seasons. He helped them win two consecutive Divizia A titles in the 1968–69 and 1969–70 seasons under coach Nicolae Dumitrescu. He contributed with eight goals in 27 appearances in the first season and one goal in 30 games in the second. Petescu also played European football with The Old Lady, captaining the team as they managed to eliminate defending European Cup champions Feyenoord in the 1970–71 European Cup season. The following year, he played eight games in the 1971–72 UEFA Cup campaign as UTA reached the quarter-finals, where they were eliminated by Tottenham Hotspur who eventually won the competition. He made his last Divizia A appearance on 20 June 1973 in UTA's 0–0 draw against Universitatea Cluj, totaling 326 matches with 24 goals in the competition and 22 appearances in European competitions.

Petescu ended his playing career at FC Dordrecht in the Netherlands.

== International career ==
Under the guidance of coaches Nicolae Dumitrescu and Gheorghe Ola, Petescu helped Romania's under-18 national team win the 1962 European championship.

Petescu played two games for Romania, making his debut on 27 October 1968 under coach Angelo Niculescu in a 3–0 loss to Portugal in the 1970 World Cup qualifiers. His second game was a 0–0 friendly draw against England. He was chosen by coach Silviu Ploeșteanu to be part of Romania's Olympic team for the 1964 Summer Olympics in Tokyo, where he played three games, helping the team finish in fifth place.

For winning the 1962 European Under-18 Championship, Petescu was decorated by President of Romania, Traian Băsescu on 25 March 2008, with the Ordinul "Meritul Sportiv" – (The Medal of "Sportive Merit") Class III.

== Managerial career ==
After years of preparation, Petescu and his wife defected while on a state-approved vacation to the Netherlands. There, he started a coaching career and became known for promoting youngsters in the teams he coached. He coached Louis van Gaal at Telstar and Sparta, and discovered Danny Blind among many other players.

== Sports agent career ==
Petescu became a sports agent following the end of his career as a football player and manager. After the 1989 Romanian Revolution, he oversaw the first important transfer in Romanian football, Gheorghe Hagi's move from Steaua București to Real Madrid for $4 million. He also worked on the transfers of Gheorghe Popescu to PSV Eindhoven, Ioan Sabău to Feyenoord and Dorinel Munteanu to Cercle Brugge.

== Death ==
Petescu died on 16 December 2018, at the age of 76.

== Honours ==
=== Club ===
UTA Arad

- Divizia A: 1968–69, 1969–70

Steaua București

- Cupa României: 1965–66, 1966–67

=== International ===
Romania U18

- Under-18 European Championship: 1962
