= 1966 Cupa României final =

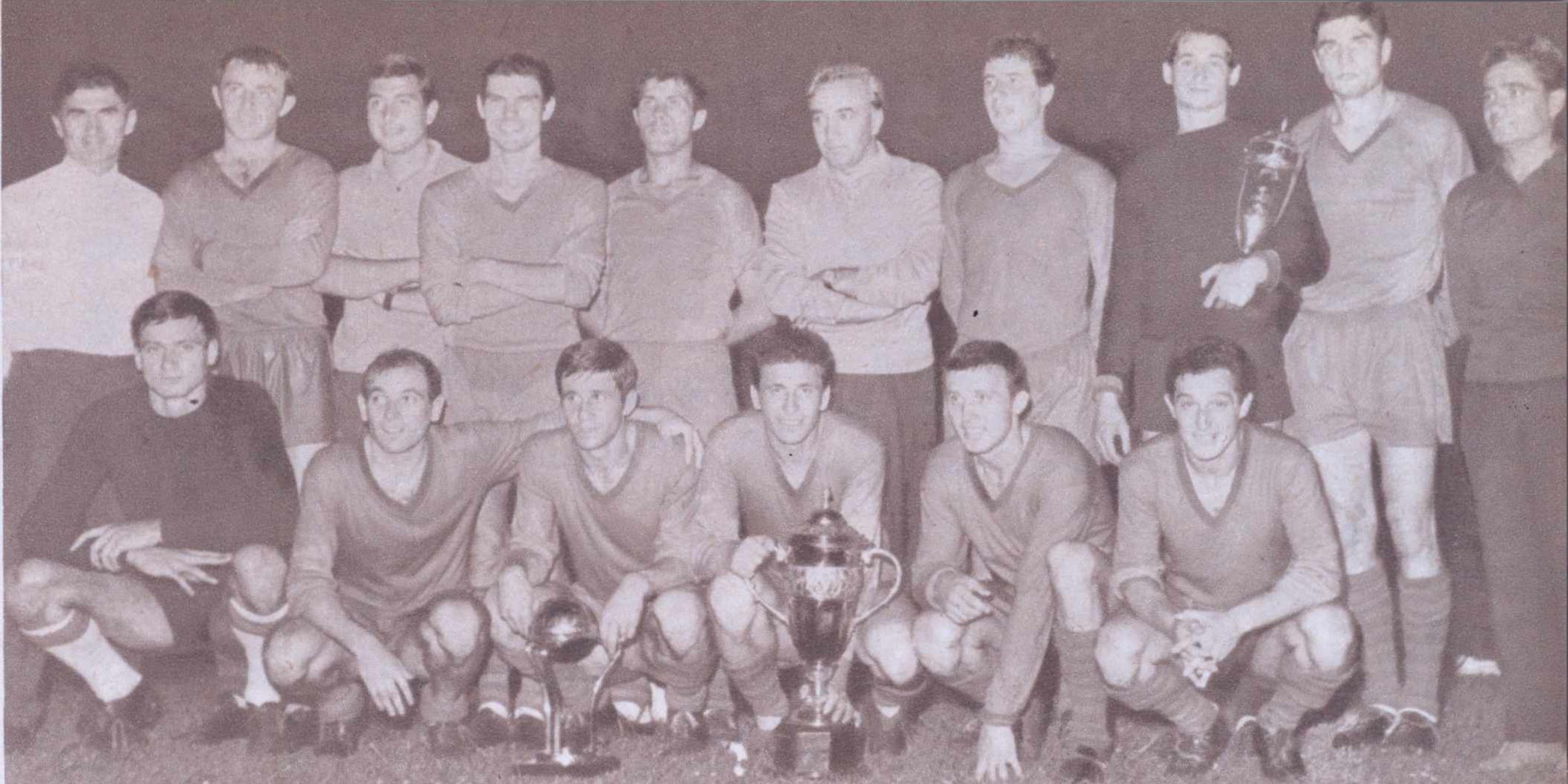
- Steaua posing with the trophy
- Event: 1965–66 Cupa României
Steaua București	UTA Arad
4	0
- Date: 17 July 1966
- Venue: 23 August, Bucharest
- Referee: Erwin Vetter (GDR)
- Attendance: 30,000

The 1966 Cupa României final was the 28th final of Romania's most prestigious football cup competition. It was disputed between Steaua București and UTA Arad, and was won by Steaua București after a game with 4 goals. It was the 7th cup for Steaua București.

== Match details ==
17 July 1966
17:30 EET

Steaua București	4–0	UTA Arad
Raksi 63', 70'; Voinea 75'; Sătmăreanu 88'	Report

23 August, Bucharest
Attendance: 30,000
Referee: Erwin Vetter (GDR)

GK	1	(Romania) Vasile Suciu (substituted off)
DF	2	(Romania) Mircea Petescu
DF	3	(Romania) Emerich Jenei
DF	4	(Romania) Dumitru Nicolae
DF	5	(Romania) Lajos Sătmăreanu
MF	6	(Romania) Vasile Negrea
MF	7	(Romania) Dumitru Popescu
FW	8	(Romania) Sorin Avram
FW	9	(Romania) Gheorghe Constantin
FW	10	(Romania) Florea Voinea
FW	11	(Romania) Gavril Raksi
Substitutions:
GK	12	(Romania) Carol Haidu (substituted in)
Manager:
(Romania) Ilie Savu

GK	1	(Romania) Carol Weichelt
DF	2	(Romania) Gavrilă Birău
DF	3	(Romania) Dumitru Chivu
DF	4	(Greece) Christos Metskas (substituted off)
DF	5	(Romania) Ioan Igna
MF	6	(Romania) Vasile Jac
MF	7	(Romania) Emil Floruţ
FW	8	(Romania) Nicolae Pantea
FW	9	(Romania) Flavius Domide
FW	10	(Romania) Mihai Țârlea
FW	11	(Romania) Mircea Axente
Substitutions:
DF	12	(Romania) Ladislau Petschovski III (substituted in)
Manager:
(Romania) Nicolae Dumitrescu

== See also ==
- List of Cupa României finals
