= Nicolae Pantea =

Romanian footballer and manager

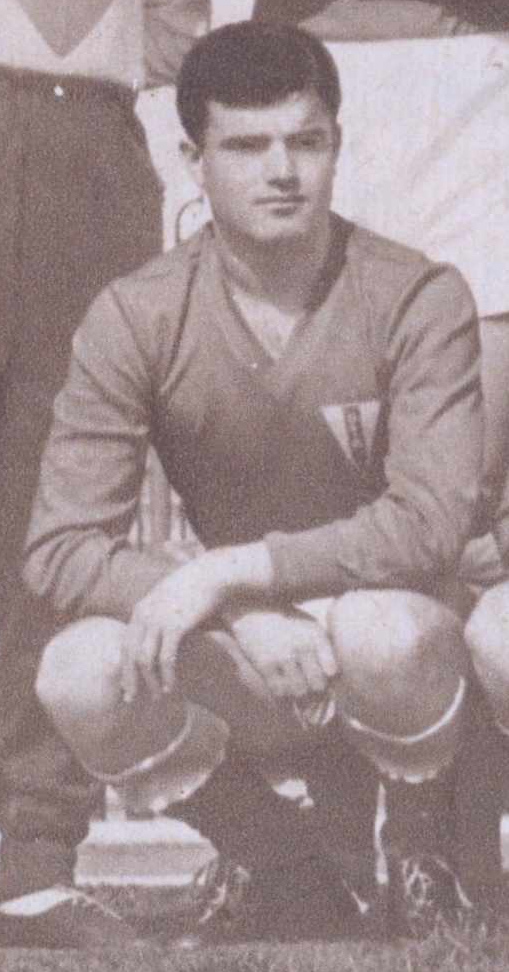
- Pantea with UTA Arad in 1966

Personal information
- Date of birth: 12 February 1946 (age 80)
- Place of birth: Beliu, Arad County, Romania
- Height: 1.80 m (5 ft 11 in)
- Position: Midfielder

Youth career
- 1961–1964: Rapid Arad

Senior career*
Years	Team	Apps	(Gls)
1964–1966	UTA Arad	49	(6)
1966–1975	Steaua București	196	(24)
1975–1977	Petrolul Ploiești	1	(0)
Total		246	(30)

International career
1971	Romania Olympic	1	(0)
1972–1973	Romania	2	(1)

Managerial career
- 1981–1983: Steaua București (assistant)
- 1984: UTA Arad
- * Club domestic league appearances and goals

Nicolae Pantea (born 12 February 1946) is a Romanian former footballer and manager.

== Club career ==
Pantea was born on 12 February 1946 in Beliu, Arad County, Romania and began playing junior-level football in 1961 at Rapid Arad for three years. Subsequently, he went to UTA Arad and made his Divizia A debut on 30 August 1964 under coach Coloman Braun-Bogdan in a 3–0 away loss to Steagul Roșu Brașov. He reached with UTA the 1966 Cupa României final where coach Nicolae Dumitrescu used him the entire match in the 4–0 loss to Steaua București. Shortly afterwards, Pantea joined Steaua, a team with whom he won the 1967–68 title in which coach Ștefan Kovács used him in six matches. He also won the Cupa României four times, in the years 1967, 1969, 1970 and 1971, but played only in the second and the latter of the finals. During his time with The Military Men he also made 14 appearances in European competitions. Pantea played six games in 1971–72 European Cup Winners' Cup campaign, as the team reached the quarter-finals by eliminating Hibernians and Barcelona, being eliminated on the away goal rule after 1–1 on aggregate by Bayern Munich. Over the years, he also netted two goals in a loss and a victory in the derby against Dinamo București. After nine seasons spent at Steaua, Pantea alongside Florian Dumitrescu and six other players were sent to Divizia B club Petrolul Ploiești in exchange for Constantin Zamfir. However, he retired shortly afterwards. Pantea accumulated a total of 249 appearances with 30 goals in Divizia A and 35 matches in which he netted seven times in Cupa României.

== International career ==
Pantea played two games for Romania, making his debut on 23 April 1972 under coach Gheorghe Ola in a 2–2 friendly draw against Peru. In his second match for the national team, he scored his first and only goal for The Tricolours, which was the fifth goal in the team's biggest ever victory, a 9–0 against Finland in the 1974 World Cup qualifiers. In 1971, Pantea also made an appearance for Romania's Olympic team in a 2–1 away victory against Albania.

=== International goals ===
Nicolae Pantea: International Goals
#	Date	Venue	Opponent	Score	Result	Competition
1	14 October 1973	August 23 Stadium, Bucharest, Romania	Finland	5–0	9–0	1974 World Cup qualifiers

== Managerial career ==
Pantea first worked as a coach at Steaua's Center for Children and Juniors, in various age categories, and in parallel, in certain periods he was an assistant at Romania's national youth team. In 1984, he was for a short time head coach at UTA Arad while the team was in Divizia B. From 1985 until 1990, he was the head of Steaua's Center for Children and Juniors, then he worked for the Romanian Football Federation as a deputy general secretary, being responsible for the youth sector. In 2000, he was the head of the Central Commission of Referees for a few months. In 2016, the stadium from Pantea's native commune, Beliu, was renamed after him in his honor.

== Honours ==
UTA Arad

- Cupa României runner-up: 1965–66

Steaua București

- Divizia A: 1967–68
- Cupa României: 1966–67, 1968–69, 1969–70, 1970–71

Petrolul Ploiești

- Divizia B: 1976–77
