= Gavrilă Birău =

Romanian footballer (1945–2025)

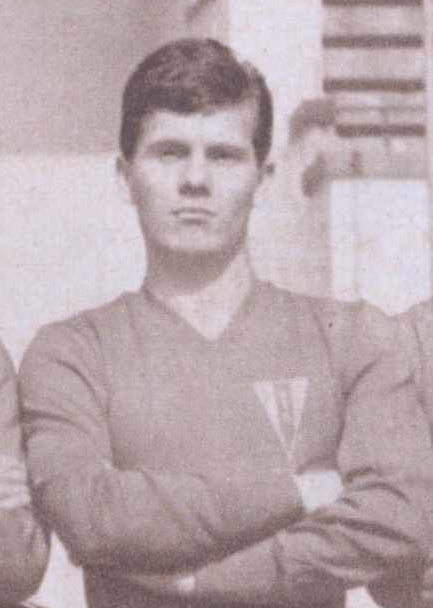
- Birău with UTA Arad in 1966

Personal information
- Date of birth: 10 February 1945
- Place of birth: Sfântu Gheorghe, Romania
- Date of death: 16 March 2025 (aged 80)
- Place of death: Arad, Romania
- Height: 1.75 m (5 ft 9 in)
- Position: Right-back

Youth career
- 1958–1964: Textila Sfântu Gheorghe

Senior career*
Years	Team	Apps	(Gls)
1965–1976	UTA Arad	319	(3)
1976–1977	Aurul Brad		

International career
1966	Romania U23	1	(0)

Managerial career
- 1981–1982: Strungul Arad
- 1982–1983: UTA Arad
- 1987–1988: UTA Arad
- 1989–1990: UTA Arad
- * Club domestic league appearances and goals

Gavrilă Birău (also known as Gábor Bíró; 10 February 1945 – 16 March 2025) was a Romanian football player and manager. A right-back, he spent most of his career with UTA Arad.

== Club career ==
Birău was born on 10 February 1945 in Sfântu Gheorghe, Romania and practised ice hockey, skiing, boxing and football until he was around the age of 18 when he began focusing exclusively on football. He played junior level football at Textila Sfântu Gheorghe as a forward. In 1963 coach Gheorghe Ola called him up at a Romania youth team for a match against Turkey in which he was seen by UTA Arad's coach Nicolae Dumitrescu who proposed he come to UTA and Birău accepted. Dumitrescu gave him his Divizia A debut on 14 March 1965 in a 1–0 home victory against Steagul Roșu Brașov, also from this point on his playing position was right-back. His first performance was reaching the 1966 Cupa României final which was lost 4–0 to Steaua București. Afterwards he won two consecutive titles in the 1968–69 and 1969–70 seasons. Coach Dumitrescu used him for 30 matches in each of those seasons, scoring a goal in the second one. Birău also made some European performances with The Old Lady, such as eliminating defending champions Feyenoord in the 1970–71 European Cup. In the 1971–72 UEFA Cup he helped the club reach the quarter-finals where they were eliminated by Tottenham Hotspur who eventually won the competition. He spent 12 seasons at UTA, his last Divizia A game took place on 20 June 1976 in a 3–2 away loss to ASA Târgu Mureș, totaling 319 matches with three goals in the competition and 14 appearances in European competitions. Birău retired after he spent one season in Divizia B at Aurul Brad.

== International career ==
In 1966, Birău made one appearance for Romania's under-23 team in a 3–3 draw against Poland.

== Later life and death ==
After he ended his career, Birău coached teams from Arad like Strungul, Indagrara, CPL and also UTA on a few occasions. He also worked as a youth coach. A book about him was written by Radu Romănescu and Ionel Costin, titled Gabi Birău – povestea fundașului de fier (Gabi Birău – the story of the iron defender), which was released on the occasion of his 73rd birthday.

Birău died on 16 March 2025, at the age of 80.

== Honours ==
UTA Arad

- Divizia A: 1968–69, 1969–70
- Cupa României runner-up: 1965–66
