= Eugen Pojoni =

Romanian footballer (1942–2026)

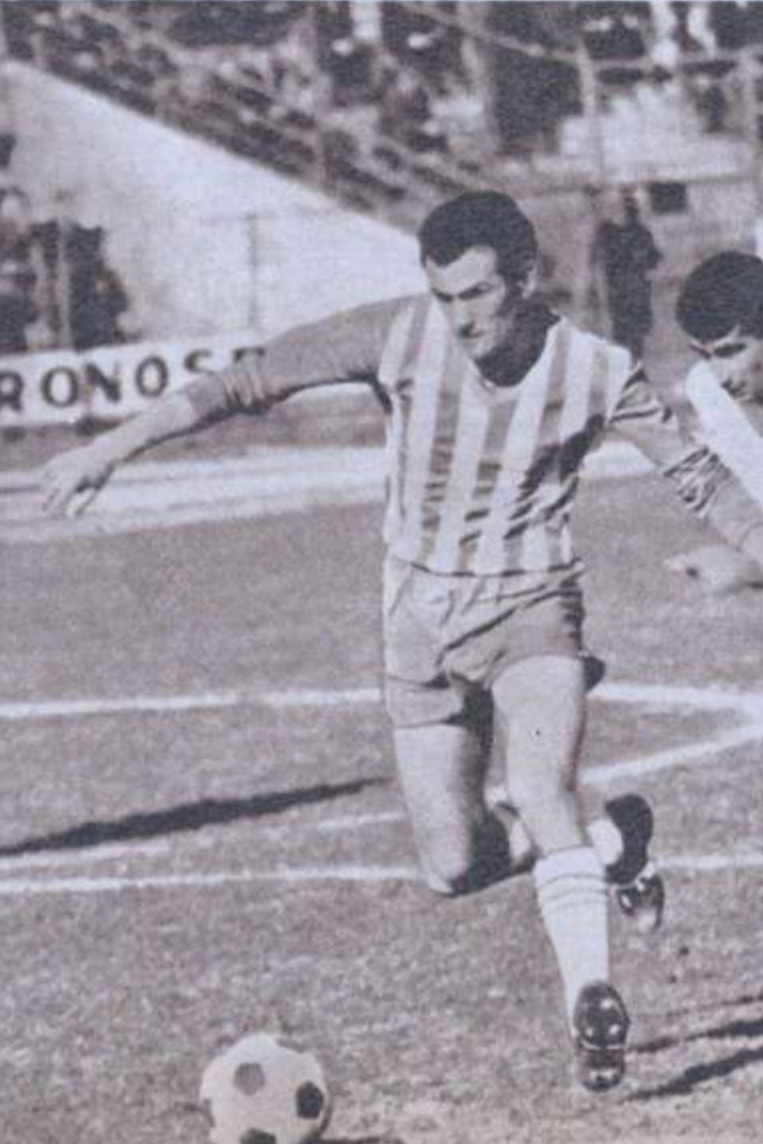
- Pojoni in 1968

Personal information
- Date of birth: 1 January 1942
- Place of birth: Libánfalva, Hungary
- Date of death: 11 January 2026 (aged 84)
- Place of death: Budapest, Hungary
- Height: 1.82 m (6 ft 0 in)
- Position: Defender

Youth career
- 1957–1961: Avântul Reghin

Senior career*
Years	Team	Apps	(Gls)
1961	Avântul Reghin		
1962	Viitorul București	1	(0)
1963–1967	Crișul Oradea (Note: The statistics for the 1966–67 Divizia B season are unavailable.)	57	(2)
1967–1977	UTA Arad	247	(9)
Total		305	(11)

International career
1961	Romania U18		
- * Club domestic league appearances and goals

Eugen Pojoni (also known as Jenő Pozsonyi; 1 January 1942 – 11 January 2026) was a Romanian footballer who played as a defender.

== Club career ==
Pojoni was born in Libánfalva, Kingdom of Hungary on 1 January 1942. He did not meet his father until he was five years old because the parent was a prisoner of the Soviets during World War II. In 1955, his parents took him to the Reghin Municipal Stadium to watch the Divizia A match between Avântul Reghin and UTA Arad, where he was impressed by UTA's style of play, led by József Pecsovszky, hoping to play for them one day. Pojoni began playing football for the junior squads of Avântul, then he started to play for the senior team in the lower leagues. After participating in the 1961 European Under-18 Championship, he went with coach Gheorghe Ola to play for Viitorul București where he made his Divizia A debut on 26 August 1962 in a 2–2 draw against UTA. That would remain his only appearance for Viitorul as in the middle of the season he joined Crișul Oradea in Divizia B. In his first season spent at Crișul, Pojoni helped the club gain promotion to Divizia A where he would play for the next three seasons. However, during this time he was absent from the field for about one year, suffering from hepatitis.

At the end of the 1965–66 season, Crișul was relegated back to Divizia B where Pojoni played for a while, but he wanted to return to Divizia A football, having an offer from UTA. The club's officials did not allow him to go. However, after dictator Nicolae Ceaușescu talked with the first secretaries from both towns, the transfer was approved. Pojoni stayed with UTA until the end of his career which consisted of 10 Divizia A seasons. He won two consecutive titles under coach Nicolae Dumitrescu in the 1968–69 and 1969–70 seasons. He contributed with two goals scored in 29 appearances in the first season and in the second he played 26 games. Pojoni also made some European performances with The Old Lady, such as eliminating defending champions Feyenoord in the 1970–71 European Cup. In the 1971–72 UEFA Cup he helped the club reach the quarter-finals where they were eliminated by Tottenham Hotspur who eventually won the competition. Pojoni's last Divizia A game took place on 1 September 1976 in a 3–0 away loss to FC Constanța, totaling 295 appearances with nine goals in the competition and 16 matches in European competitions.

== International career ==
Pojoni was called up by coach Gheorghe Ola to be part of Romania's under 18 national team squad for the 1961 European Under-18 Championship held in Portugal where they did not get past the group stage. During his time at the final tournament, Pojoni had a discussion with Benfica's coach Béla Guttmann who offered him the opportunity to stay in Portugal and sign with his team, but he declined the offer.

Throughout his career, Pojoni was called up by coach Angelo Niculescu at Romania's senior team to play in some friendly games. During one of them, he was sent by Niculescu to warm-up and shortly afterwards was told to sit on the bench, as he wouldn't play. Because of this, Pojoni got upset and told the coach not to call him anymore.

== Coaching career ==
Pojoni worked as a coach in the Romanian lower leagues, and during his spell at the local club from Oravița, he debuted the future Romanian international Dorinel Munteanu in Divizia C football at the age of 14.

== Death ==
Pojoni died on 11 January 2026 in Budapest, Hungary, at the age of 84.

== Honours ==
Crișul Oradea

- Divizia B: 1962–63

UTA Arad

- Divizia A: 1968–69, 1969–70
