= Gheorghe Gornea =

Romanian footballer

Gica Gornea
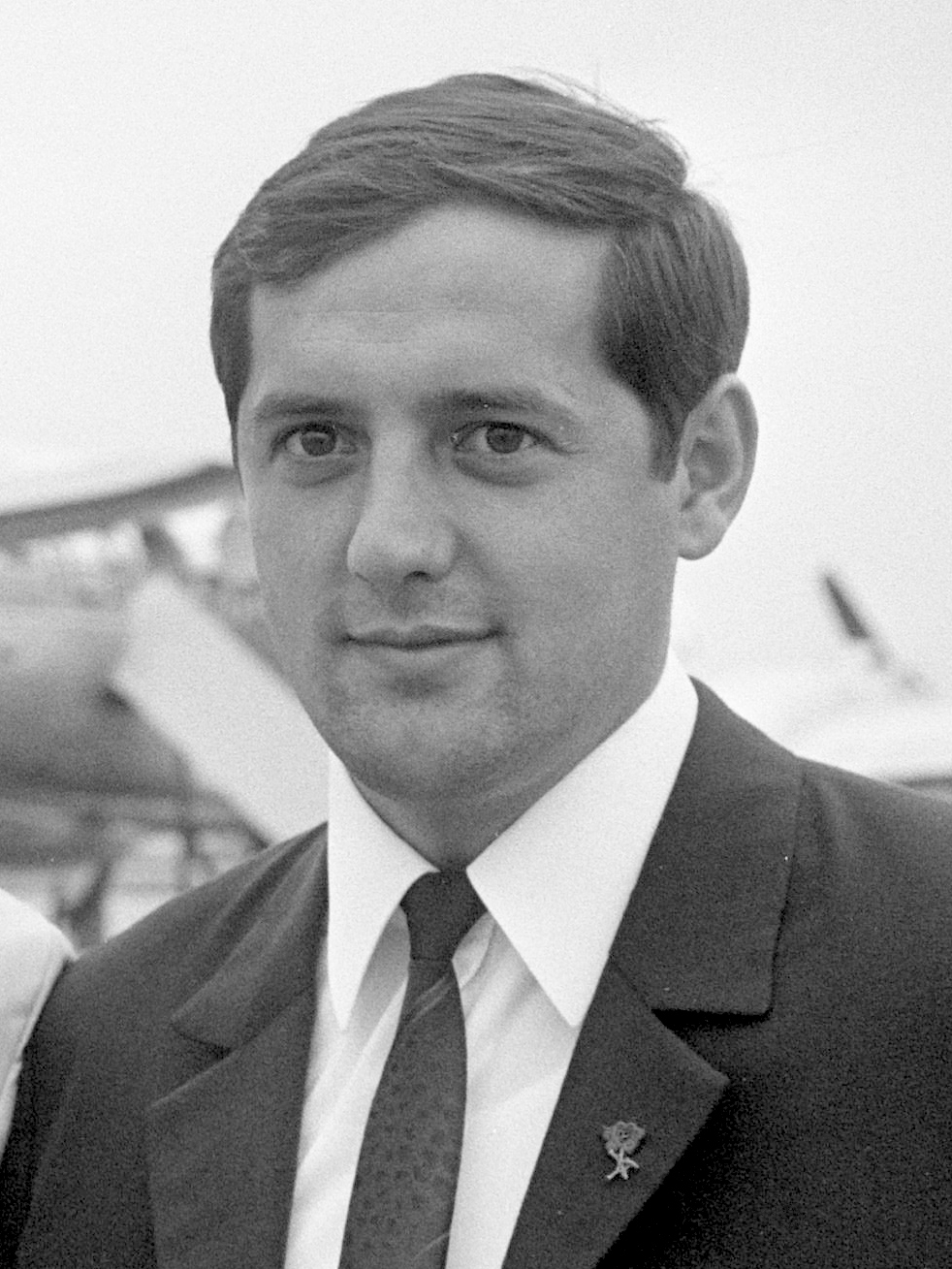
- Gornea in 1970

Personal information
- Full name: Gheorghe Gornea
- Date of birth: 2 August 1944
- Place of birth: Sinaia, Romania
- Date of death: 2005 (aged 60–61)
- Place of death: Sinaia, Romania
- Position: Goalkeeper

Senior career*
Years	Team	Apps	(Gls)
1963–1964	Carpați Sinaia		
1964–1966	Steaua București	3	(0)
1966–1971	UTA Arad	127	(0)
1971–1972	Minerul Baia Mare	8	(0)
1972–1973	CSM Reșița	13	(0)
1973–1976	Rapid Arad	41	(0)
Total		192	(0)

International career
1968–1970	Romania	4	(0)
- * Club domestic league appearances and goals

Gheorghe Gornea (2 August 1944 – 2005) was a Romanian football goalkeeper.

== Club career ==
Gornea was born on 2 August 1944 in Sinaia, Romania and began playing football at local club Carpați. He was transferred to Steaua București where he made his Divizia A debut on 30 August 1964 under coach Ilie Savu in a 4–0 away victory against Știința Craiova. In his second season spent at Steaua he won the Cupa României.

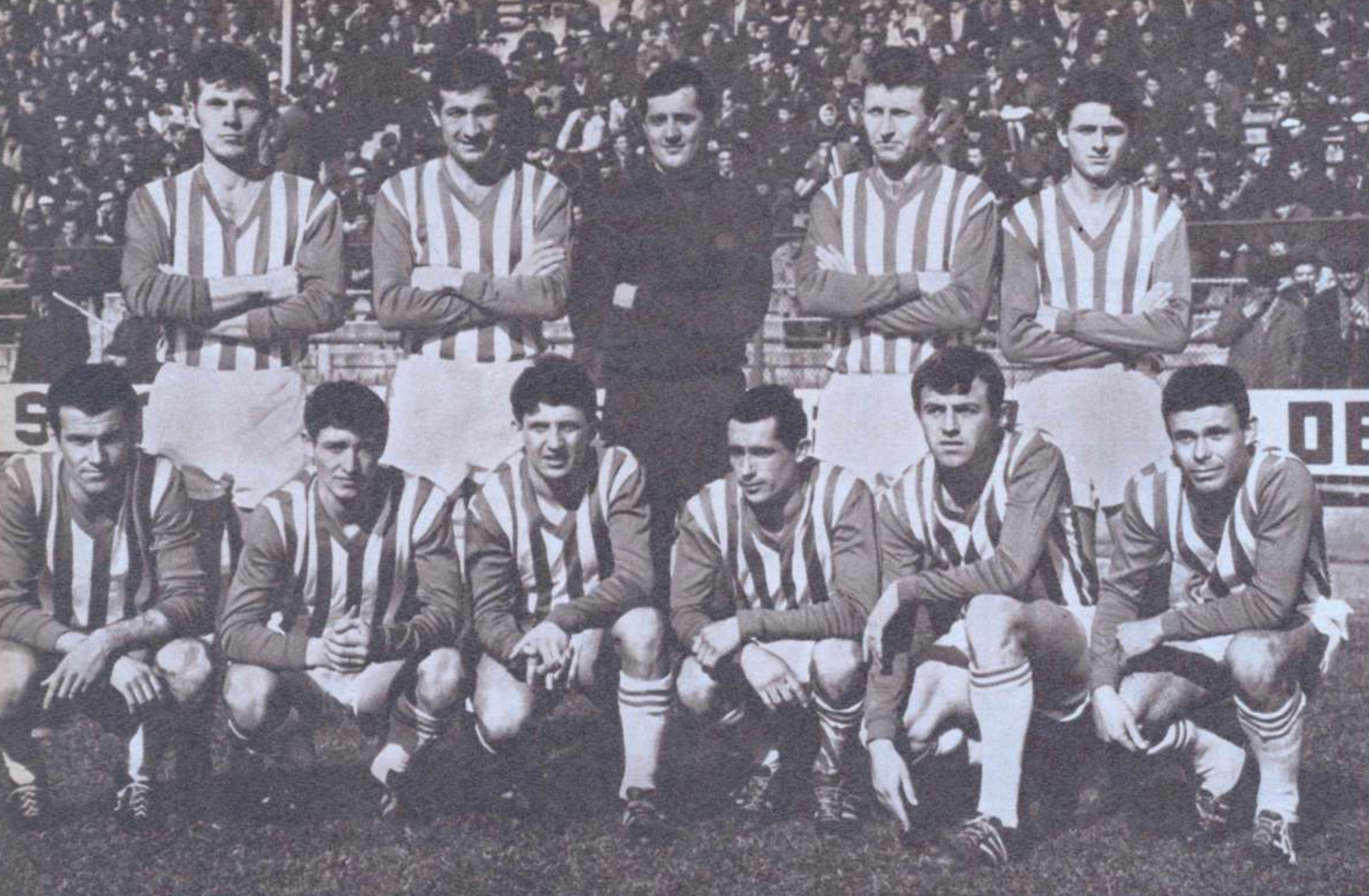
Gornea (back row, center) with UTA Arad in 1968

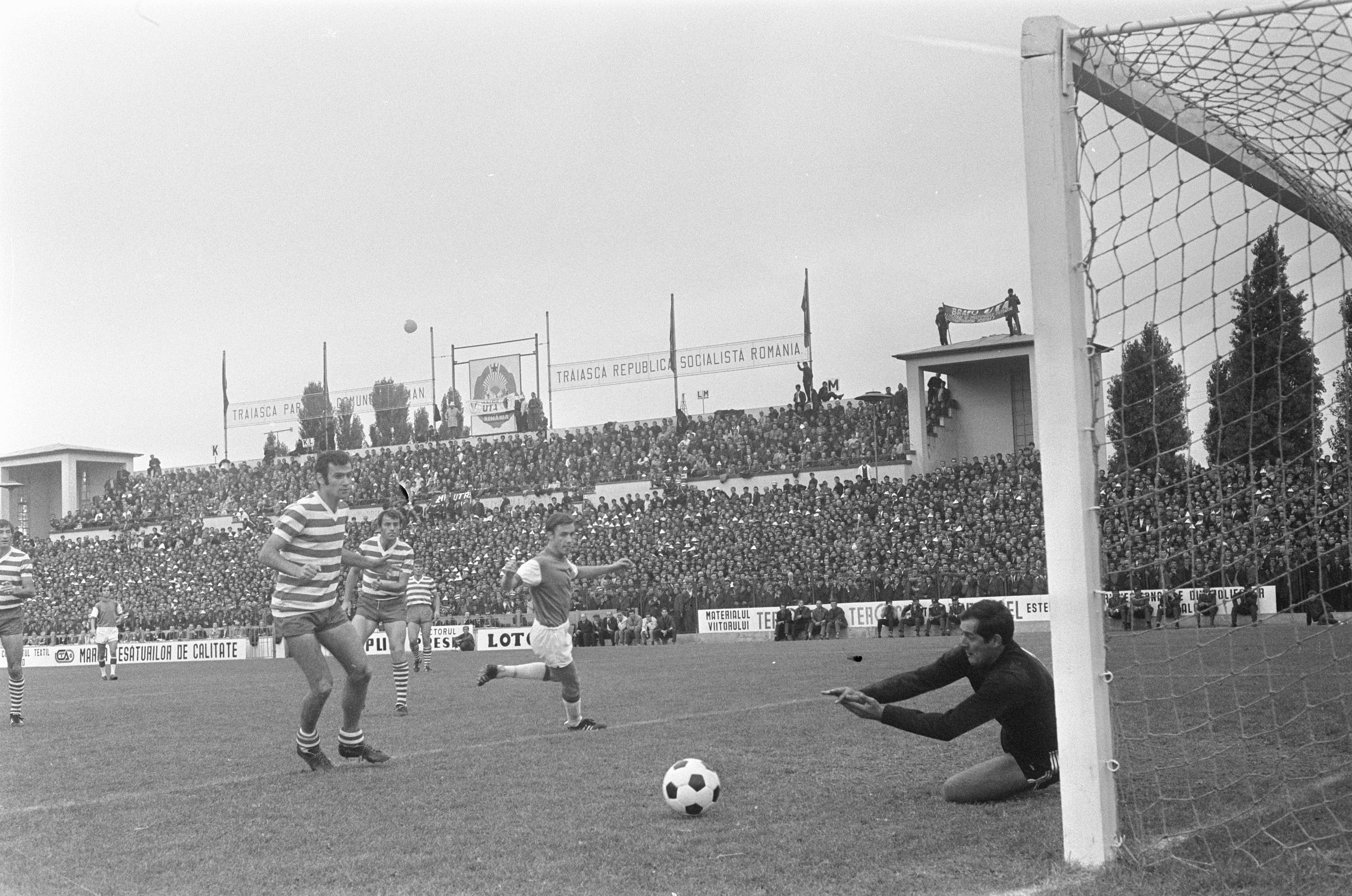
Gornea in action during the 1970–71 European Cup second-leg match against Feyenoord

Afterwards he went to play for UTA Arad where in his five years spent at the club he won two consecutive titles in the 1968–69 and 1969–70 seasons. Coach Nicolae Dumitrescu used him in 30 games in the first one and in 29 matches in the second. He also helped the team by delivering a praised performance when they eliminated the defending European Cup champions Feyenoord in the 1970–71 European Cup season, having a total of six appearances in the competition over the course of two seasons. For the way he played in 1968, Gornea was placed fourth in the ranking for the Romanian Footballer of the Year award.

In 1971, Gornea went to play for one season in Divizia B at Minerul Baia Mare. Afterwards he joined CSM Reșița, being brought there by his former coach from UTA, Ioan Reinhardt, where on 11 March 1973 he made his last Divizia A appearance in a 5–1 loss to Steagul Roșu Brașov, totaling 143 matches played in the competition. He retired after playing three more seasons at Rapid Arad in Divizia B.

== International career ==
Gornea played four games for Romania in which he conceded two goals, all under the guidance of coach Angelo Niculescu. He made his debut on 27 October 1968, when he came on as a substitute at halftime and replaced Narcis Coman in a 3–0 away loss to Portugal in the 1970 World Cup qualifiers, where he conceded one goal from Jacinto Santos. His following game was a 0–0 friendly draw against England, followed by a 2–0 victory over Switzerland in the 1970 World Cup qualifiers. His last game was another friendly against England, at the Wembley Stadium that ended with a 1–1 draw where his appreciated performance earned him the nickname "The hero from Wembley". Niculescu also selected Gornea for Romania's 1970 World Cup final tournament, though he did not play in any matches there.

== Death ==
After he retired, Gornea struggled with alcoholism and had both of his legs amputated, dying in 2005 in his native town, Sinaia.

== Honours ==
Steaua București

- Cupa României: 1965–66

UTA Arad

- Divizia A: 1968–69, 1969–70

Individual

- Romanian Footballer of the Year (fourth place): 1968
