= Flavius Domide =

Romanian footballer (1946–2025)

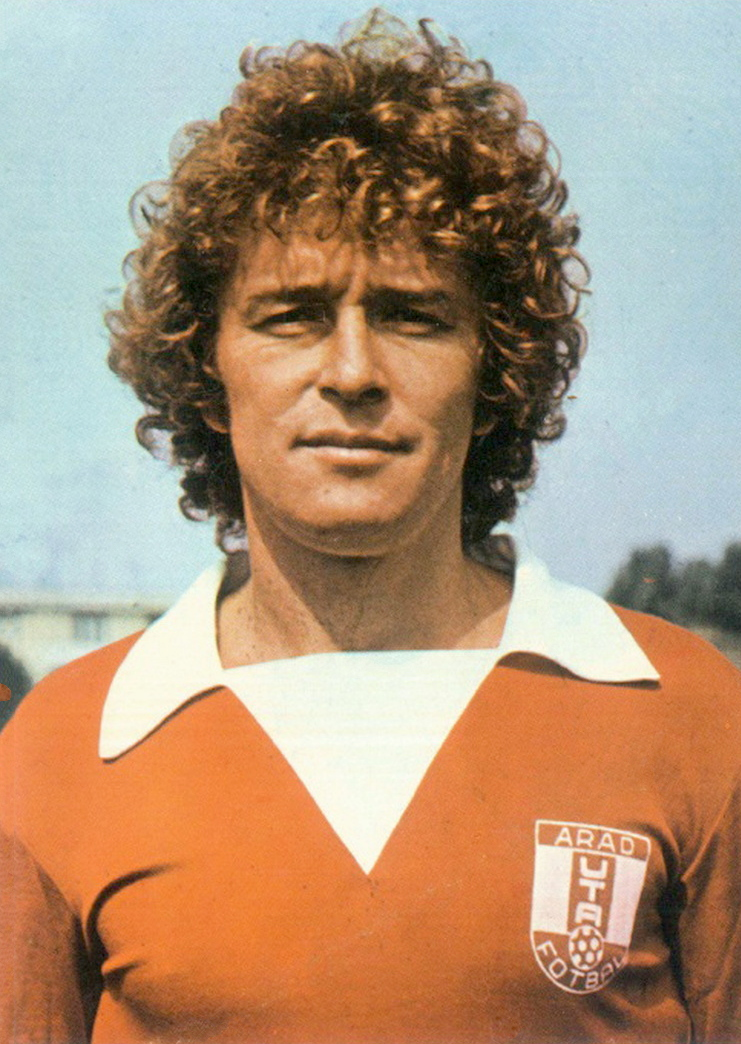
- Domide with UTA Arad

Personal information
- Full name: Flavius Virgil Domide
- Date of birth: 7 May 1946
- Place of birth: Arad, Romania
- Date of death: 11 October 2025 (aged 79)
- Place of death: Arad, Romania
- Height: 1.83 m (6 ft 0 in)
- Position: Striker

Youth career
- 1959–1966: UTA Arad

Senior career*
Years	Team	Apps	(Gls)
1966–1979	UTA Arad	342	(75)
1979–1980	Vagonul Arad		

International career
1968–1972	Romania (Note: Including two appearances for Romania's Olympic team.)	19	(3)

Managerial career
- 1981–1983: Carpați Mârșa
- 1983–1984: UTA Arad
- 1984–1987: UTA Arad (juniors)
- 1987–1989: Oțelul Ștei
- 1989–1991: Strungul Arad
- 1991–1992: Békéscsaba
- 1992–1993: UTA Arad
- 1994–1999: UTA Arad (juniors)
- 1999: Politehnica Timișoara
- * Club domestic league appearances and goals

Flavius Virgil Domide (7 May 1946 – 11 October 2025) was a Romanian professional football player and coach. He played as a striker in Divizia A for 14 years before retiring. Domide achieved success with his local club UTA, winning two domestic league titles. He also represented Romania at the 1970 FIFA World Cup.

== Club career ==
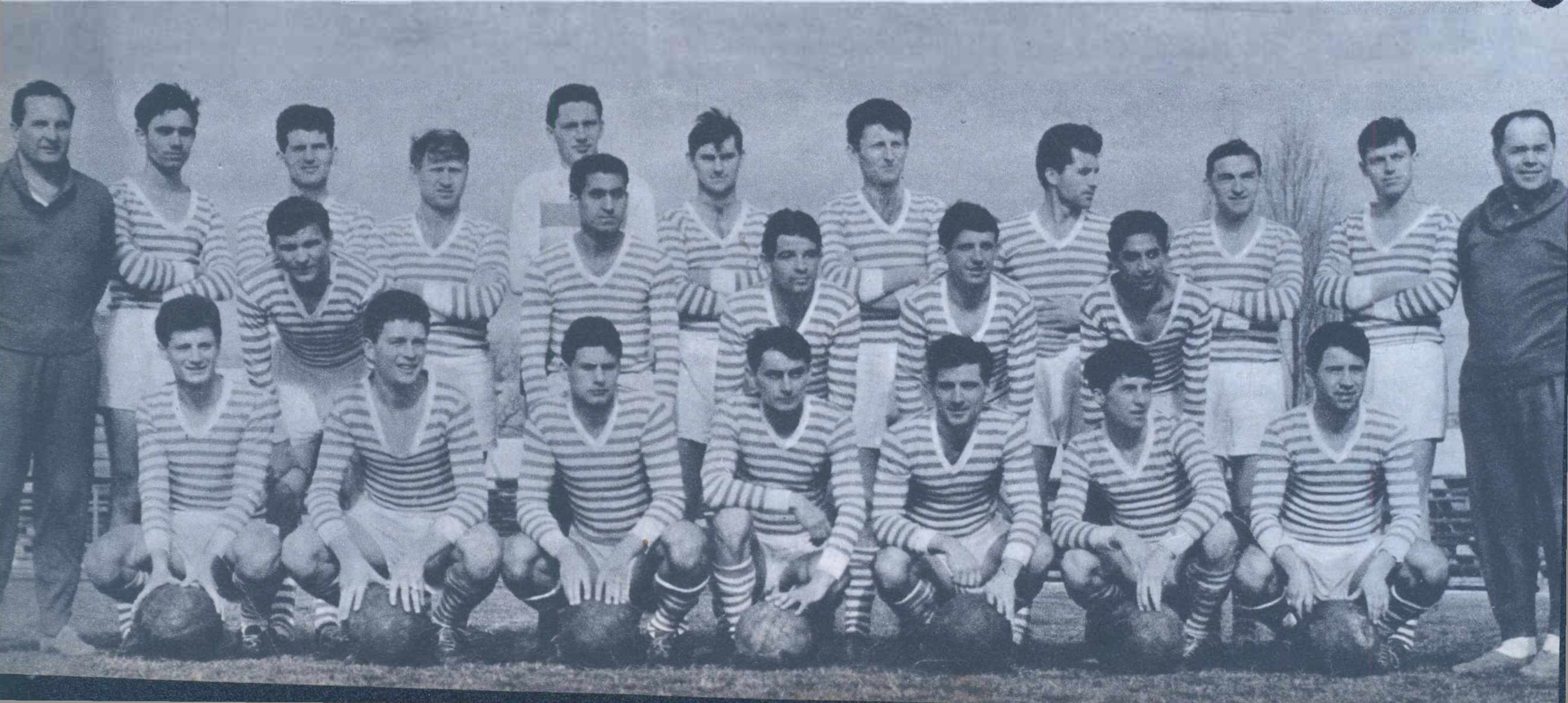
Domide (bottom row, second from the left) with UTA Arad in 1965

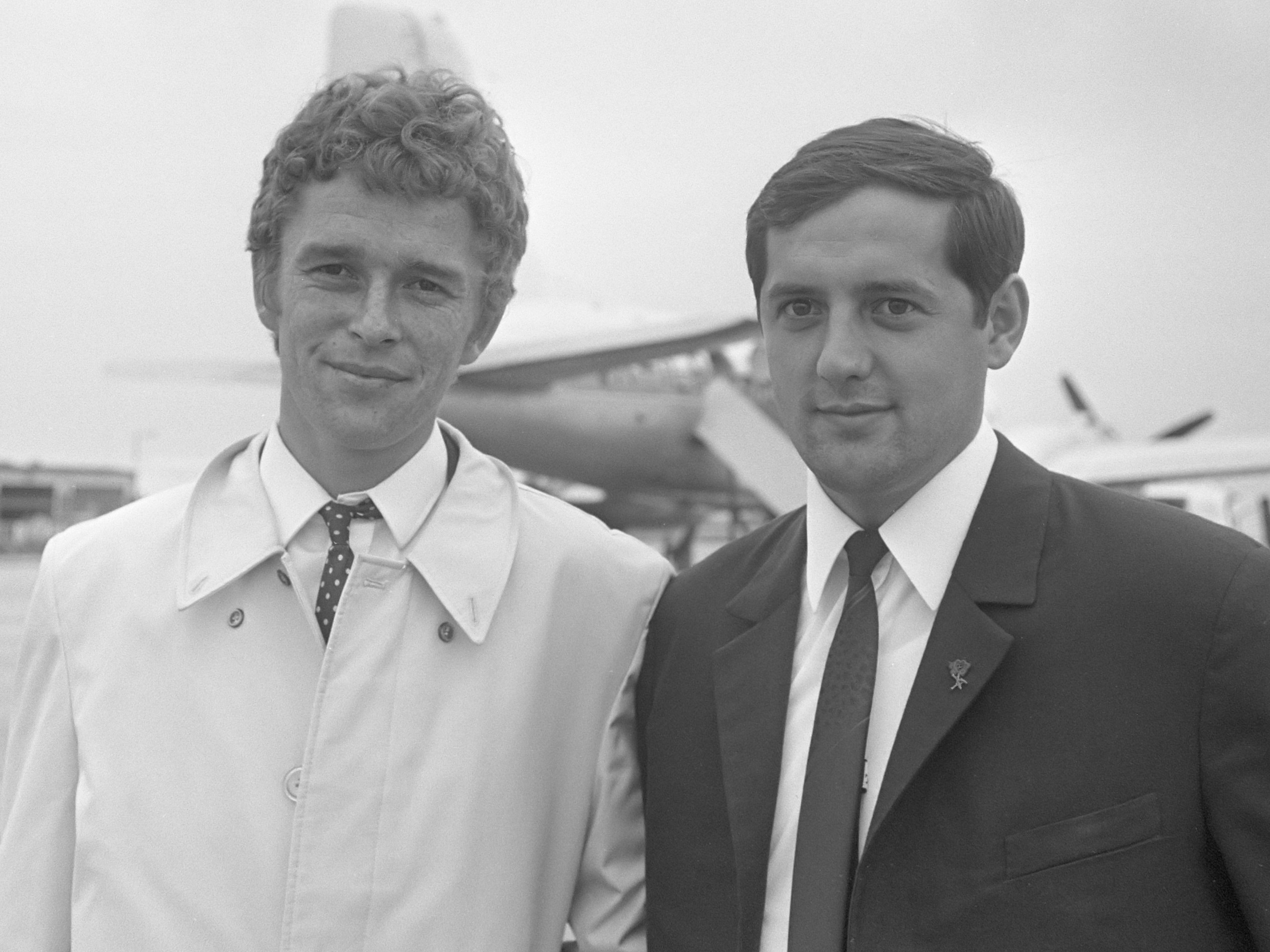
Domide (left) with UTA teammate Gheorghe Gornea in 1970

Domide was born on 7 May 1946 in Arad, Romania and began playing football as a child on the streets of the Pârneava neighborhood. He later went to play for the juniors of UTA Arad. He made his Divizia A debut on 28 August 1966 under coach Nicolae Dumitrescu in UTA's 0–0 draw against Rapid București. Under the guidance of Dumitrescu, Domide won two consecutive league titles with The Old Lady in the 1968–69 and 1969–70 seasons. In the first one, he contributed with eight goals scored in 30 appearances and in the second he played 29 games and netted a personal record of 11 goals. He also made some European performances with UTA, such as eliminating defending champions Feyenoord in the 1970–71 European Cup season. In the 1971–72 UEFA Cup, Domide helped them reach the quarter-finals, playing eight matches in the campaign, scoring two goals against Austria Salzburg, one against Zagłębie Wałbrzych, one against Vitória Setúbal and his team's only goal in the 3–1 aggregate loss to Tottenham Hotspur who eventually won the competition. On 9 December 1973, he scored the final goal for a 3–0 victory in the West derby against Politehnica Timișoara. He made his last Divizia A appearance on 10 June 1979 in UTA's 1–0 home loss to Gloria Buzău, totaling 342 games with 75 goals in the competition and 16 matches with six goals in European competitions. Domide retired in 1980, after he spent the last year of his career at Vagonul Arad in the third division, helping them gain promotion to the second division.

== International career ==
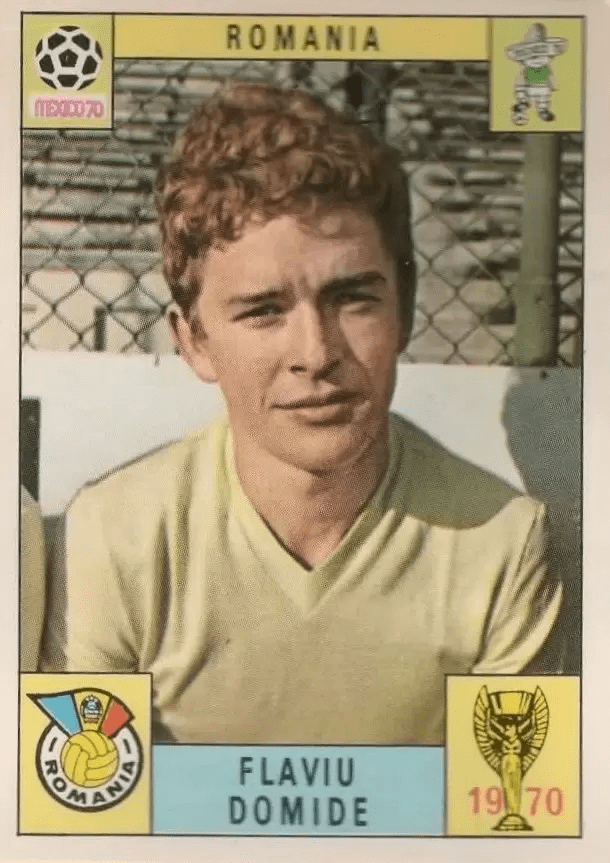
Flavius Domide with Romania on a Panini sticker

Domide played 17 matches and scored three goals for Romania (19/3 including Romania's Olympic team games), making his debut on 6 November 1968 when coach Angelo Niculescu sent him in the 77th minute to replace Nicolae Dobrin in a 0–0 friendly draw against England. His following game was a 2–0 victory against Switzerland in which he scored a goal in the successful 1970 World Cup qualifiers. Domide was selected by Niculescu to be part of the squad that went to the final tournament, but did not play a single match there. He played five matches in the 1972 Euro qualifiers, managing to reach the quarter-finals where Romania was defeated by Hungary, who advanced to the final tournament. Domide's last game for the national team was a 1–1 draw against Finland during the 1974 World Cup qualifiers.

For representing his country at the 1970 World Cup, Domide was decorated by President of Romania Traian Băsescu on 25 March 2008 with the Ordinul "Meritul Sportiv" – (The Medal "The Sportive Merit") class III.

=== International goals ===
Scores and results list Romania's goal tally first, score column indicates score after each Domide goal.

No.	Date	Venue	Opponent	Score	Result	Competition
1	23 November 1968	23 August Stadium, Bucharest, Romania	Switzerland	2–0	2–0	1970 FIFA World Cup qualification
2	30 January 1972	Stade Mohamed V, Casablanca, Morocco	Morocco	4–2	4–2	Friendly
3	17 June 1972	23 August Stadium, Bucharest, Romania	Italy	2–2	3–3	Friendly

== Post-playing career ==
After hanging up his boots, Domide managed both UTA's junior and senior teams. He led UTA to the Divizia B title in the 1992–93 season, earning the club promotion back to Divizia A. Around 1997, he became UTA's president during a period of financial difficulties and contributed some of his own money to keep the club afloat. He coached Politehnica Timișoara in 1999.

== Personal life and death ==
A book about Domide was written by Radu Romănescu and Ionel Costin, titled Flavius Domide – copilul teribil al fotbalului arădean (The Terrible Child of Arad football), which was released on the occasion of his 70th birthday. In 2023, Domide received the Honorary Citizen of Arad title.

Domide died in Arad on 11 October 2025, at the age of 79.

== Honours ==
=== Player ===
UTA Arad

- Divizia A: 1968–69, 1969–70

Vagonul Arad

- Divizia C: 1979–80

=== Manager ===
UTA Arad

- Divizia B: 1992–93
