= Florian Dumitrescu =

Romanian footballer

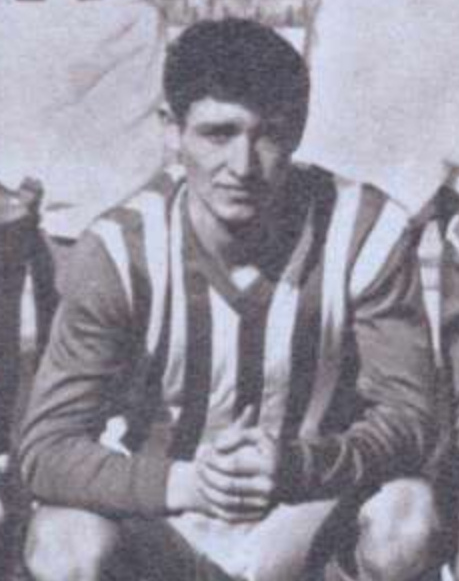
- Dumitrescu with UTA in 1968

Personal information
- Date of birth: 27 October 1946 (age 80)
- Place of birth: Bucharest, Romania
- Height: 1.73 m (5 ft 8 in)
- Position: Forward

Youth career
- 1961–1964: Avântul 9 Mai București

Senior career*
Years	Team	Apps	(Gls)
1964–1966	Minerul Anina		
1967–1971	UTA Arad	85	(9)
1971–1974	Dinamo București	66	(15)
1974–1975	Steaua București	30	(2)
1975–1979	Petrolul Ploiești (Note: The statistics for the 1975–76 and 1978–79 Divizia B seasons are unavailable.)	61	(11)
1979–1981	Olt Scornicești	29	(1)
Total		271	(38)

International career
1970–1972	Romania (Note: Including one appearance for Romania's Olympic team)	5	(0)
- * Club domestic league appearances and goals

Florian Dumitrescu (born 27 October 1946) is a Romanian former footballer who played as a forward. In the 1970–71 European Cup, Dumitrescu scored UTA's decisive goal that eliminated Feyenoord who were European champions at that time.

== Club career ==
Dumitrescu was born on 27 October 1946 in Bucharest, Romania and began playing junior-level football in 1961 at Avântul 9 Mai. From 1964 until 1966 he played at Minerul Anina in Divizia C where he was noticed by UTA Arad's coach Nicolae Dumitrescu who brought him to the club. The coach gave him his Divizia A debut on 12 March 1967 in a 2–1 home loss to Rapid București. Under the guidance of Dumitrescu he helped The Old Lady win two consecutive titles in the 1968–69 and 1969–70 seasons. In the first he contributed with two goals scored in 15 appearances and in the second he played 29 games, scoring four times. In the 1970–71 European Cup, Dumitrescu scored UTA's decisive goal that eliminated defending champions Feyenoord after he received an assist from Mircea Axente and defeated goalkeeper Eddy Treijtel with a header while being in between opponents Rinus Israel and Theo van Duivenbode. In the following round they got eliminated by Red Star Belgrade where after the first leg, the opponents' coach was asked by journalist Ioan Chirilă which player from UTA would he bring to his team and Miljan Miljanić named Dumitrescu.

In 1971, he went to Dinamo București for three seasons. The highlights of this period were eight goals scored in the 1971–72 season and winning the title in the following season, contributing with five goals in the 26 appearances given to him by coach Ion Nunweiller. Dumitrescu also represented The Red Dogs in European competitions, most notably in the 1971–72 European Cup, helping the team get past Spartak Trnava in the first round, but they were eliminated in the following one by his old acquaintance, Feyenoord.

In 1974, he went for one season at Dinamo's rival Steaua București. Subsequently, Dumitrescu alongside Nicolae Pantea and six other players were sent to Divizia B club Petrolul Ploiești in exchange for Constantin Zamfir. He helped The Yellow Wolves get promoted to the first league in his second season. However, the team was relegated back to the second division after just one year. After playing one more year with Petrolul in Divizia B, Dumitrescu came back to Divizia A football in 1979 when he signed with Olt Scornicești, scoring a goal in the 6–0 win over Olimpia Satu Mare in the first round of the season. Dumitrescu played his last Divizia A match on 2 November 1980, helping Scornicești earn a 4–2 home victory against FCM Galați, totaling 238 games with 31 goals in the competition and 12 appearances with one goal in the European Cup.

== International career ==
He was taken into consideration by coach Angelo Niculescu to be part of Romania's 1970 World Cup squad, but because he was injured, Dumitrescu missed the tournament. Eventually, Niculescu gave him his debut on 11 October 1970 in a 3–0 home victory against Finland in the Euro 1972 qualifiers where he also played in a 0–0 draw against Wales. Dumitrescu made a total of four appearances for the national team, his last one occurred on 20 September 1972, a 1–1 draw against Finland in the 1974 World Cup qualifiers. He also played once for Romania's Olympic team in a 2–1 victory against Albania in the 1972 Summer Olympics qualifiers.

== Honours ==
UTA Arad

- Divizia A: 1968–69, 1969–70

Dinamo București

- Divizia A: 1972–73

Petrolul Ploiești

- Divizia B: 1976–77
