= Vasile Suciu (footballer) =

Romanian footballer (1942–2013)

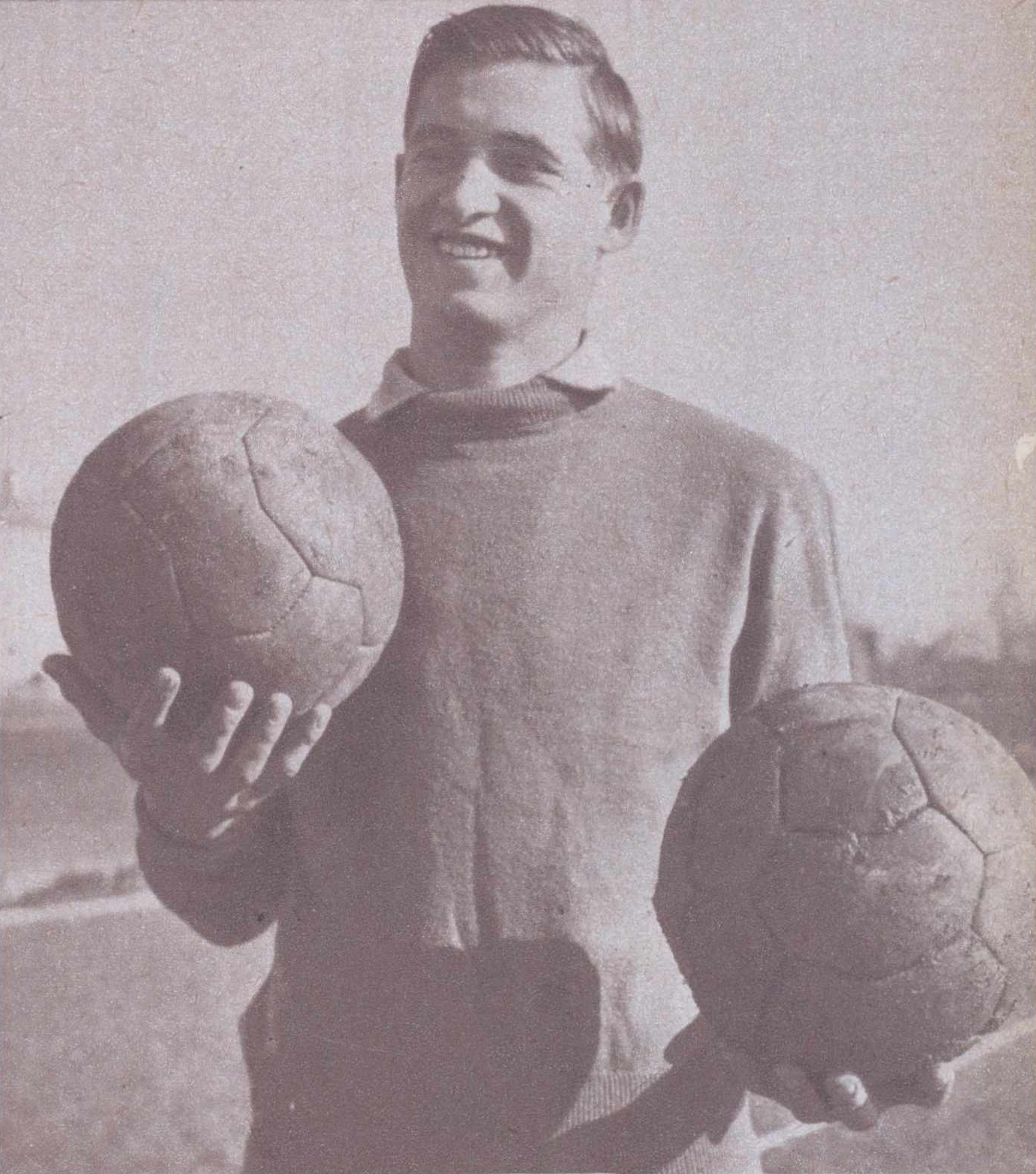
- Suciu with Steaua Bucharest in 1963

Personal information
- Date of birth: 21 October 1942
- Place of birth: Iacobeni, Romania
- Date of death: 9 November 2013 (aged 71)
- Place of death: Cluj-Napoca, Romania
- Position: Goalkeeper

Youth career
- 1955–1958: Izolatorul Turda

Senior career*
Years	Team	Apps	(Gls)
1958–1962	Arieșul Turda		
1962–1963	Viitorul București		
1963–1971	Steaua București	124	(0)
1971–1972	Jiul Petroșani	30	(0)
1972–1975	Sportul Studențesc		

International career
- Romania U18
1964–1972	Romania (Note: Including two appearances for Romania's Olympic team.)	3	(0)
- * Club domestic league appearances and goals

Vasile Suciu (21 October 1942 – 9 November 2013) was a Romanian footballer, who played as a goalkeeper.

Suciu died of lung cancer in 2013 at the age of 71, in Cluj-Napoca.

== Honours ==
Arieșul Turda

- Cupa României: 1960–61

Steaua București

- Romanian League: 1967–68
- Cupa României: 1965–66, 1966–67, 1968–69, 1969–70, 1970–71

Romania

- UEFA European Under-18 Championship: 1962
