= Lajos Sătmăreanu =

Romanian footballer (1944–2025)

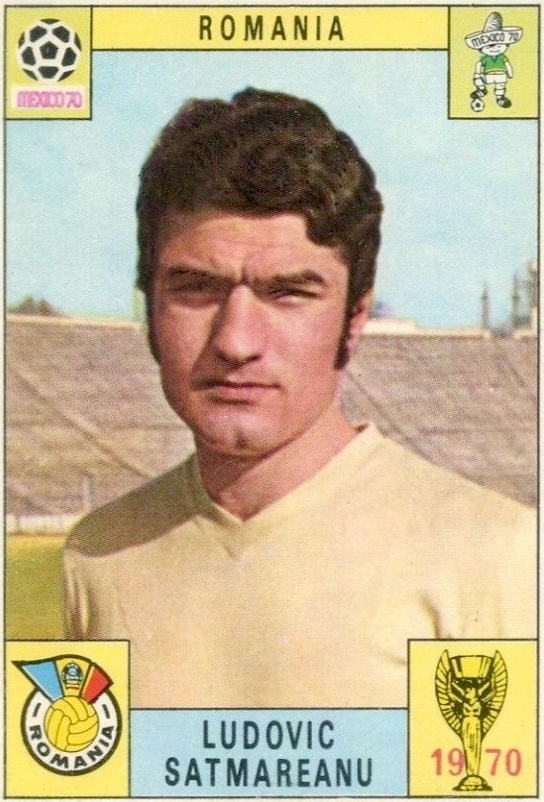
- Sătmăreanu in 1970

Personal information
- Date of birth: 21 February 1944
- Place of birth: Nagyszalonta, Kingdom of Hungary (now Salonta, Romania)
- Date of death: 30 June 2025 (aged 81)
- Place of death: Romania
- Height: 1.85 m (6 ft 1 in)
- Position: Right-back

Youth career
- 1958–1960: Stăruința Salonta

Senior career*
Years	Team	Apps	(Gls)
1960–1962	Stăruința Salonta		
1962–1963	Crișana Oradea	4	(0)
1963–1964	Flamura Roșie Oradea	18	(1)
1964–1965	ASA Târgu Mureș	12	(1)
1965–1975	Steaua București	271	(11)
1975	Bihor Oradea	14	(1)
1975–1977	Progresul București (Note: The statistics for the 1975–76 Divizia B season are unavailable.)	20	(0)
Total		339	(14)

International career
1965–1967	Romania Olympic	2	(0)
1967–1973	Romania	42	(1)

Managerial career
- 1977–1989: Steaua București (youth)
- 1989: Bihor Oradea
- 1989–2011: Steaua București (youth)
- 2011: Școala Privată de Fotbal "Vasile Matincă" (youth)
- 2011–2016: Argeșul Mihăilești
- 2016–2022: CSA Steaua București (youth)
- * Club domestic league appearances and goals

Lajos Sătmăreanu (Romanian: [ˈlajoʃ sətməˈre̯anu]; also known as Ludovic Sătmăreanu, Hungarian: Szatmári Lajos, 21 February 1944 – 30 June 2025) was a Romanian footballer and manager who played as a right-back. He played for the Romanian Olympic and national teams, as well as various Romanian clubs, winning a Divizia A title and five Cupa României. Later in life, he coached or managed various clubs, both youth and professional clubs.

== Club career ==
Sătmăreanu, nicknamed Facchetti of the Carpathians, was born on 21 February 1944 in Salonta, Hungary (now Romania), and began playing football in 1958 at local club Recolta. He made his Divizia A debut on 17 March 1963, playing for Crișana Oradea under coach Constantin Woronkowski in a 4–2 away loss to Steaua București. Shortly afterwards he moved to play at neighboring team Flamura Roșie in Divizia B for one season.

After another Divizia B season, which he spent at ASA Târgu Mureș, Sătmăreanu joined Steaua for 10 seasons. He won the league title in the 1967–68 season, being used by coach Ștefan Kovács in 26 matches. He also won five Cupa României, playing in all the finals, scoring the last goal of the 4–0 victory against UTA Arad in the 1966 final. For the way he played in 1968, Sătmăreanu was placed third in the ranking for the Romanian Footballer of the Year award, and was fourth in the following year. German club Hertha BSC wanted to sign Sătmăreanu after his performance in the 1970 World Cup, but Romania's communist regime refused to let him go. During his period spent with The Military Men, he also played 20 games in European competitions. He took part in the 1971–72 European Cup Winners' Cup campaign, playing all six games as the team reached the quarter-finals by eliminating Hibernians and Barcelona, being eliminated after 1–1 on aggregate on the away goal rule by Bayern Munich.

In 1975, he joined fellow Divizia A team Bihor Oradea, leaving after half a season to play in Divizia B for Progresul București under the guidance of coach Viorel Mateianu. Sătmăreanu helped Progresul earn promotion to the first league, making his last Divizia A appearance on 8 June 1977 in a 2–1 home victory against FCM Reșița, totaling 306 matches with six goals in the competition.

== International career ==
"Sătmăreanu was one of the most constant players I had at the World Cup in Mexico."

— Angelo Niculescu, former Romania manager

Sătmăreanu played for Romania in 42 matches, scoring one goal, making his debut under coach Bazil Marian in a 1–1 friendly draw against Uruguay, which took place in Montevideo at Estadio Gran Parque Central. He competed for the Romanian Olympic team from 1967 to 1968, where he made two appearances. He played six games in the successful 1970 World Cup qualifiers. Coach Angelo Niculescu used him for the entirety of all three games in the final tournament which were a win against Czechoslovakia and losses to England and Brazil, as his side failed to progress from their group. Sătmăreanu played nine matches in the 1972 Euro qualifiers, scoring one goal in the first of three quarter-finals games against Hungary, who eventually defeated Romania to advance to the final tournament. He played four matches during the 1974 World Cup qualifiers, his last one was a 1–0 victory against East Germany.

For representing his country at the 1970 World Cup, Sătmăreanu was decorated by President of Romania Traian Băsescu on 25 March 2008 with the Ordinul "Meritul Sportiv" – (The Medal "The Sportive Merit") class III.

== Coaching career ==
Sătmăreanu worked as a coach at the juvenile level, mostly at Steaua București where between 1977 and 2011 he taught generations of players, which include Daniel Gherasim, Dan Petrescu, Marius Mitu, Robert Niță and George Ogăraru. Afterwards, he coached juniors at Școala Privată de Fotbal "Vasile Matincă" for a short while. Then he coached senior team Argeșul Mihăilești in the Romanian lower leagues for a few years, before returning to coaching juniors in 2016 at CSA Steaua București until 2022.

== Personal life and death ==
Sătmăreanu was of Hungarian ethnicity. Sports commentator Ilie Dobre wrote a book about him titled Lajos Sătmăreanu - "Steaua" de ieri (Lajos Sătmăreanu - Yesterday's "Star"), which was released in 2003.

He died on 30 June 2025, at the age of 81.

== Career statistics ==
Scores and results list Romania's goal tally first, score column indicates score after each Sătmăreanu goal.

List of international goals scored by Lajos Sătmăreanu
#	Date	Venue	Cap	Opponent	Score	Result	Competition
1	29 April 1972	Népstadion, Budapest, Hungary	31	Hungary	1–1	1–1	Euro 1972 quarter-finals

== Honours ==
Steaua București

- Divizia A: 1967–68
- Cupa României: 1965–66, 1966–67, 1968–69, 1969–70, 1970–71

Progresul București

- Divizia B: 1975–76

Individual

- Romanian Footballer of the Year (third place): 1968, (fourth place): 1969
