= Mircea Axente (footballer, born 1944) =

Romanian footballer

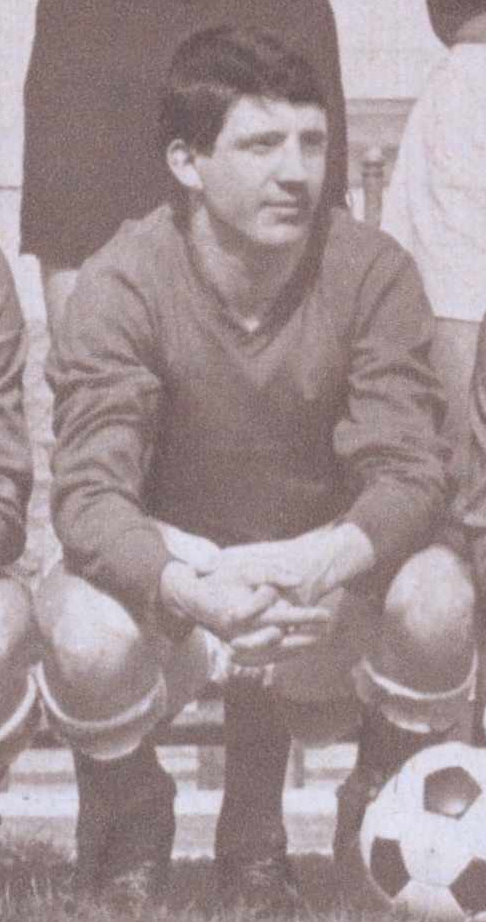
- Axente with UTA Arad in 1966

Personal information
- Date of birth: 9 December 1944 (age 81)
- Place of birth: Arad, Romania
- Height: 1.80 m (5 ft 11 in)
- Position: Midfielder

Youth career
- Gloria Arad
- UTA Arad

Senior career*
Years	Team	Apps	(Gls)
1963–1976	UTA Arad	286	(42)
1976–1977	Rapid Arad		

International career
1966	Romania U23	1	(1)
1970	Romania B	3	(0)
- * Club domestic league appearances and goals

Mircea Axente (born 9 December 1944) is a Romanian former football midfielder and referee.

== Club career ==
Axente was born on 9 December 1944 in Arad, Romania and began playing junior-level football at local club Gloria. After he was seen by UTA Arad's coach Nicolae Dumitrescu at a school championship, he was signed by The Old Lady. There, he made his Divizia A debut on 21 June 1964 under coach Coloman Braun-Bogdan in a 2–0 away loss to Știința Cluj. His first performance was reaching the 1966 Cupa României final which was lost with 4–0 to Steaua București. Afterwards he won two consecutive titles under coach Dumitrescu in the 1968–69 and 1969–70 seasons. In the first he scored eight goals in 29 appearances and in the second he played 30 games and scored six times. Axente also made some European performances with UTA, as he provided the assist to Florian Dumitrescu who scored their decisive goal that eliminated defending champions Feyenoord in the 1970–71 European Cup. In the 1971–72 UEFA Cup, he helped the club reach the quarter-finals where they were eliminated by Tottenham Hotspur who eventually won the competition. He spent 13 seasons at UTA, his last Divizia A game occurred on 20 June 1976 in a 3–2 away loss to ASA Târgu Mureș, totaling 286 matches with 42 goals scored in the competition and 11 appearances in European competitions. Axente retired in 1977 after he spent a season in Divizia B at Rapid Arad.

== International career ==
Axente played one game in 1966 for Romania's under-23 team, a 3–3 draw against Poland in which netted one goal. In 1970 he made three appearances for Romania's B squad, consisting of two losses against Mexico and a win over El Salvador.

== After retirement ==
After he ended his playing career, Axente became a referee, officiating matches in Romania's top-league Divizia A and at international and European club level.

A book about him was written by Radu Romănescu and Ionel Costin, titled Mircea Axente, de pe maidanele Aradului în casa campioanei lumii (Mircea Axente, from the slopes of Arad in the world champion's house).

== Honours ==
UTA Arad

- Divizia A: 1968–69, 1969–70
- Cupa României runner-up: 1965–66
