= Pâncota oil field =

Oil field in Arad County, Romania

Pâncota
- Country: Romania
- Region: Arad County
- Offshore/onshore: onshore
- Operator: Universal Premium

Field history
- Discovery: 2012
- Start of development: 2012
- Start of production: 2014

Production
- Current production of oil: 800 barrels per day (~40,000 t/a)
- Estimated oil in place: 1.5 million tonnes (~ 1.7×10^{6} m^{3} or 11 million bbl)

The Pâncota oil field is an oil field located in Pâncota, Arad County. It was discovered in 2012 and developed by Universal Premium. It will begin production in 2014 and will produce oil. The total proven reserves of the Pâncota oil field are around 11 million barrels (1.5 million tonnes), and production will be centered on 800 barrels per day (130 m^{3}/d).
