= Atodiresei =

Atodiresei is a Romanian surname. Notable people with the surname include:

- Cosmin Atodiresei (born 1994), Romanian luger
- Ion Atodiresei (born 1952), Romanian footballer
- Ionuț Atodiresei (born 1981), Romanian kickboxer
