= Viorel Sima =

Romanian footballer

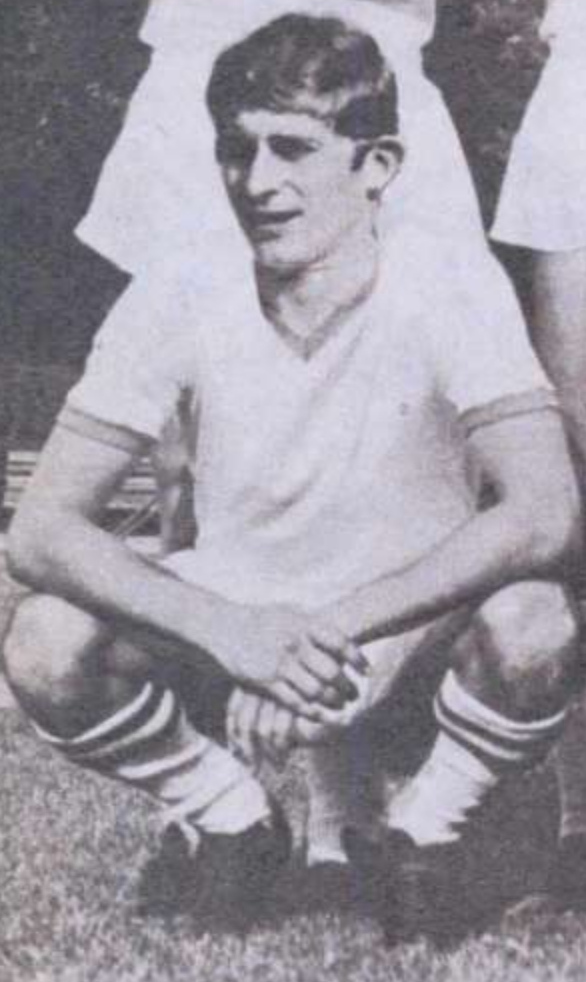

Personal information
- Date of birth: 30 April 1950 (age 76)
- Place of birth: Sebeș, Romania
- Position: Centre back

Youth career
- UTA Arad

Senior career*
Years	Team	Apps	(Gls)
1968–1976	UTA Arad	189	(18)
1977–1980	Strungul Arad		
- * Club domestic league appearances and goals

Viorel Sima (born 30 April 1950) is a Romanian former football defender.

== Career ==
Sima was born on 30 April 1950 in Sebeș, Romania and began playing junior-level football at UTA Arad, his first coach being Dan Alexandru. Subsequently, he later worked with József Pecsovszky and Andrei Mercea, managing to win a national junior championship. In 1968 he started to play for UTA's senior team under coach Nicolae Dumitrescu, making his Divizia A debut on 24 August in a 1–0 away victory against Steaua București, totaling seven appearances by the end of the season as the club won the title. He won another title with them in the following season, Dumitrescu using him in 17 matches in which he scored two goals. He also made some European performances with The Old Lady, such as eliminating defending champions Feyenoord in the 1970–71 European Cup. In the 1971–72 UEFA Cup, Sima played eight matches and scored once in a 3–0 victory against Vitória Setúbal, the club reaching the quarter-finals where they were eliminated by Tottenham Hotspur who eventually won the competition. He made his last Divizia A appearance in UTA's 5–0 away loss to Steaua, totaling 189 matches with 18 goals in the competition and 15 games with one goal in European competitions. Sima retired after he spent a few seasons in the Romanian lower leagues at Strungul Arad.

== Honours ==
UTA Arad

- Divizia A: 1968–69, 1969–70
