= Axente =

Axente is a surname. Notable people with the surname include:

- Cătălina Axente (born 1995), Romanian wrestler
- Ioan Axente Sever (1821–1906), Romanian revolutionary in Austria-Hungary
- Mircea Ionuț Axente (born 1987), Romania football player
- Mircea Axente (footballer, born 1944), Romanian football player and referee
- Vanessa Axente (born 1995), Hungarian model
