= Ilie Moț =

Romanian footballer

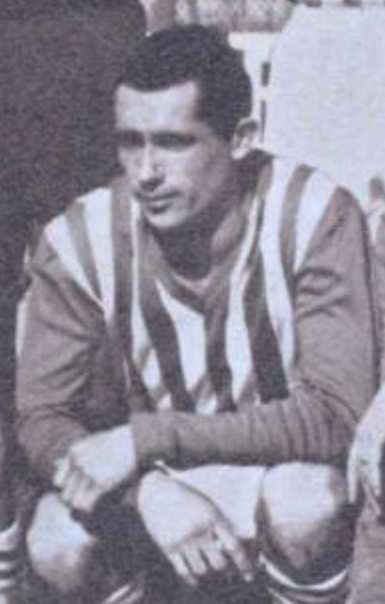
- Moț with UTA in 1968

Personal information
- Date of birth: 26 April 1946
- Place of birth: Pâncota, Romania
- Date of death: 1982/83 (aged 36)
- Place of death: Beiuș, Romania
- Position: Forward

Youth career
- Șoimii Pâncota

Senior career*
Years	Team	Apps	(Gls)
1964–1966	Vagonul Arad	30	(7)
1966–1970	UTA Arad	70	(12)
1970–1971	Vagonul Arad	15	(0)
1971–1974	CFR Simeria		
1974–1976	Rapid Arad		
Total		115	(19)
- * Club domestic league appearances and goals

Ilie Moț (26 April 1946 – 1982/83) was a Romanian football forward.

== Honours ==
UTA Arad

- Divizia A: 1968–69, 1969–70
