= Ion Atodiresei =

Romanian footballer

Personal information
- Date of birth: 14 May 1952 (age 74)
- Place of birth: Arad, Romania
- Height: 1.68 m (5 ft 6 in)
- Position: Forward

Youth career
- Teba Arad
- 1966–1969: UTA Arad

Senior career*
Years	Team	Apps	(Gls)
1969–1970	UTA Arad	5	(0)
1970–1971	Vagonul Arad	22	(5)
1971–1978	FCM Reșița	203	(19)
Total		230	(24)

International career
1973–1975	Romania U23	11	(0)
1976	Romania	1	(0)
- * Club domestic league appearances and goals

Ion Atodiresei (born 14 May 1952) is a Romanian former football forward.

== Club career ==
Atodiresei was born on 14 May 1952 in Arad, Romania. He began playing football at local club Teba, and then moved to neighboring club UTA in 1966. He made his Divizia A debut under coach Nicolae Dumitrescu on 4 May 1969 in UTA's 2–1 away loss to Politehnica Iași, making one more appearance until the end of the season as the team won the title. In the following season, Dumitrescu used him in three games as they won another championship.

In 1970, Atodiresei went to play for one season at Divizia B club Vagonul Arad. Afterwards he signed with FCM Reșița where he would spend the rest of his career, helping the club earn promotion to the first league in his first season. In the 1974–75 season, Atodiresei scored a personal record of seven goals. On 15 June 1978 he made his last Divizia A appearance in Reșița's 4–0 away loss to Steaua București, totaling 179 matches with 19 goals in the competition.

== International career ==
From 1973 until 1975, Atodiresei made 11 appearances for Romania's under-23 side.

In 1976 he played one match for Romania, being used by coach Ștefan Kovács in a 1–1 friendly draw against Czechoslovakia.

== Honours ==
UTA Arad

- Divizia A: 1968–69, 1969–70

FCM Reșița

- Divizia B: 1971–72
