= 1969–70 Divizia A =

52nd season of top-tier football league in Romania

Divizia A
- Season: 1969–70
- Champions: UTA Arad
- Top goalscorer: Ion Oblemenco (19)

The 1969–70 Divizia A was the fifty-second season of Divizia A, the top-level football league of Romania.

== Teams ==
Location of teams in 1969-70 Divizia A

== League table ==
Pos	Team	Pld	W	D	L	GF	GA	GD	Pts	Qualification or relegation
1	UTA Arad (C)	30	18	3	9	54	42	+12	39	Qualification to European Cup first round
2	Rapid București	30	14	9	7	39	31	+8	37	
3	Steaua București	30	14	6	10	56	37	+19	34	Qualification to Cup Winners' Cup first round
4	Universitatea Craiova	30	13	7	10	40	37	+3	33	Invitation to Inter-Cities Fairs Cup first round
5	Dinamo București	30	14	4	12	51	41	+10	32	Invitation to Inter-Cities Fairs Cup first round
6	Farul Constanța	30	13	6	11	45	40	+5	32	
7	Jiul Petroșani	30	14	4	12	37	37	0	32	
8	Steagul roşu Brașov	30	12	6	12	38	41	−3	30	Invitation to Balkans Cup
9	Dinamo Bacău	30	10	10	10	37	42	−5	30	
10	Argeș Pitești	30	11	7	12	51	47	+4	29	
11	Universitatea Cluj	30	9	10	11	40	37	+3	28	
12	Politehnica Iași	30	12	3	15	37	39	−2	27	
13	Petrolul Ploiești	30	10	7	13	36	42	−6	27	
14	CFR Cluj	30	10	7	13	29	45	−16	27	
15	Crişul Oradea (R)	30	10	6	14	38	44	−6	26	Relegation to Divizia B
16	ASA Târgu Mureș (R)	30	5	7	18	23	49	−26	17	Relegation to Divizia B

Source: LT
Rules for classification: 1) points; 2) goal difference; 3) number of goals scored
(C) Champions; (R) Relegated

=== Results ===
Home \ Away	ASA	ARG	CFR	UCR	CRI	BAC	DIN	FAR	JIU	PET	PIA	RAP	SRB	STE	UTA	UCL
ASA Târgu Mureș	—	1–2	0–1	2–0	1–2	1–1	2–0	0–0	0–3	0–0	3–0	2–0	3–0	0–2	2–2	0–0
Argeș Pitești	1–0	—	3–0	1–1	6–1	0–0	2–1	4–1	3–1	3–0	3–1	1–3	2–2	1–2	3–2	3–1
CFR Cluj	2–0	2–1	—	0–0	0–0	0–0	2–1	1–1	2–0	2–1	1–0	1–1	1–1	1–3	1–0	1–0
Universitatea Craiova	2–1	2–2	3–0	—	2–0	2–1	1–2	4–0	1–0	2–1	2–0	1–0	1–0	1–0	4–1	1–1
Crișul Oradea	4–1	2–1	4–1	1–2	—	0–4	0–0	1–2	3–0	2–0	2–0	1–1	3–1	2–1	0–1	2–0
Dinamo Bacău	1–0	2–2	1–0	2–0	0–0	—	3–3	2–2	1–1	0–0	1–0	3–1	4–0	2–0	2–1	2–1
Dinamo București	3–1	4–1	3–1	2–1	2–1	3–1	—	2–3	5–2	1–0	0–3	0–2	1–0	0–1	6–0	1–2
Farul Constanța	0–0	3–1	4–2	4–0	1–0	4–0	1–2	—	1–0	2–1	2–0	3–0	0–0	0–2	3–1	1–1
Jiul Petroșani	3–0	2–0	2–1	1–1	2–1	2–1	1–0	2–1	—	2–0	2–0	1–1	0–0	1–0	1–0	1–0
Petrolul Ploiești	1–0	4–2	0–3	3–2	2–1	2–2	1–1	2–0	1–0	—	2–1	2–0	2–0	0–0	1–2	2–2
Politehnica Iași	4–1	1–0	3–0	1–1	1–0	1–0	1–1	2–1	3–1	3–0	—	0–0	3–0	1–2	2–1	0–2
Rapid București	1–1	1–0	2–0	1–0	3–0	1–0	1–2	1–0	4–3	1–0	2–1	—	2–0	3–3	1–2	3–2
Steagul roşu Brașov	1–0	3–2	4–1	3–0	3–1	2–1	2–1	3–0	0–1	4–3	0–1	0–1	—	4–2	1–0	1–1
Steaua București	10–1	0–0	1–0	4–1	1–1	8–0	2–3	1–3	2–1	1–0	2–1	1–1	0–0	—	2–4	2–1
UTA Arad	1–0	3–0	6–2	2–1	2–0	1–0	2–1	3–2	1–0	1–1	4–2	1–1	3–1	2–1	—	3–1
Universitatea Cluj	2–0	1–1	0–0	1–1	3–3	4–0	1–0	2–0	4–1	2–3	2–1	0–0	1–2	2–0	0–2	—

Source: LT (in Romanian)
Legend: Blue = home team win; Yellow = draw; Red = away team win.

== Top goalscorers ==
Rank	Player	Club	Goals
1	Ion Oblemenco	Universitatea Craiova	19
2	Nicolae Dobrin	Argeș Pitești	18
3	Alexandru Neagu	Rapid București	16
3	Gheorghe Tătaru	Steaua București	16
5	Otto Dembrovschi	UTA Arad	15

== Champion squad ==
UTA Arad

Goalkeepers: Gheorghe Gornea (29 / 0); Emerich Moricz (1 / 0).
Defenders: Gavrilă Birău (30 / 1); Ștefan Bakos (16 / 0); Eugen Pojoni (26 / 0); Gheorghe Czako (4 / 0); Ladislau Brosovszky (30 / 1).
Midfielders: Mircea Petescu (30 / 1); Iosif Lereter (29 / 7); Viorel Brândescu (6 / 0).
Forwards: Petru Șchiopu (19 / 2); Mircea Axente (30 / 6); Flavius Domide (29 / 11); Ilie Moț (20 / 4); Viorel Sima (17 / 2); Florian Dumitrescu (29 / 4); Otto Dembrovschi (15 / 15); Petru Regep (3 / 0); Ion Atodiresei (3 / 0); Erhard Schepp (4 / 0); Teodor Drăucean (1 / 0).
(league appearances and goals listed in brackets)

Manager: Nicolae Dumitrescu.

== See also ==
- 1969–70 Divizia B
- 1969–70 Divizia C
- 1969–70 County Championship
