= 1968–69 Divizia A =

51st season of top-tier football league in Romania

Divizia A
- Season: 1968–69
- Champions: UTA Arad
- Top goalscorer: Florea Dumitrache (22)

The 1968–69 Divizia A was the fifty-first season of Divizia A, the top-level football league of Romania.

== Teams ==
Location of teams in 1968-69 Divizia A

== League table ==
Pos	Team	Pld	W	D	L	GF	GA	GD	Pts	Qualification or relegation
1	UTA Arad (C)	30	17	4	9	50	27	+23	38	Qualification to European Cup first round
2	Dinamo București	30	15	5	10	55	33	+22	35	
3	Rapid București	30	14	6	10	41	33	+8	34	Invitation to Inter-Cities Fairs Cup first round
4	Steaua București	30	14	5	11	50	38	+12	33	Qualification to Cup Winners' Cup first round
5	Dinamo Bacău	30	13	7	10	31	28	+3	33	Invitation to Inter-Cities Fairs Cup first round
6	Jiul Petroșani	30	13	5	12	35	32	+3	31	
7	Universitatea Craiova	30	14	3	13	45	47	−2	31	Invitation to Balkans Cup
8	Universitatea Cluj	30	13	4	13	47	39	+8	30	
9	Farul Constanța	30	13	3	14	35	43	−8	29	
10	Crişul Oradea	30	10	8	12	36	33	+3	28	
11	Politehnica Iași	30	12	4	14	31	42	−11	28	
12	Argeș Pitești	30	13	1	16	38	44	−6	27	
13	Petrolul Ploiești	30	12	3	15	30	41	−11	27	
14	ASA Târgu Mureș	30	12	3	15	32	47	−15	27	
15	Progresul București (R)	30	9	8	13	30	39	−9	26	Relegation to Divizia B
16	Vagonul Arad (R)	30	10	3	17	40	60	−20	23	Relegation to Divizia B

Source: LT
Rules for classification: 1) points; 2) goal difference; 3) number of goals scored
(C) Champions; (R) Relegated

=== Results ===
Home \ Away	ASA	ARG	UCR	CRI	BAC	DIN	FAR	JIU	PET	PIA	PRO	RAP	STE	UTA	UCL	VAG
ASA Târgu Mureș	—	0–3	2–1	1–0	4–0	2–1	1–0	2–1	0–0	1–0	2–0	0–1	3–2	1–0	3–1	1–0
Argeș Pitești	3–1	—	2–0	2–1	1–0	3–1	3–2	2–0	2–1	4–0	2–0	2–1	0–2	0–2	0–1	4–0
Universitatea Craiova	3–1	4–1	—	2–0	1–0	1–0	3–1	1–0	5–1	4–1	2–0	1–0	1–1	3–2	1–0	1–2
Crișul Oradea	2–0	0–0	3–1	—	1–0	1–1	1–1	3–0	1–0	1–1	1–1	2–0	1–2	1–1	4–0	4–2
Dinamo Bacău	2–1	1–0	2–1	1–0	—	1–0	3–1	1–0	3–2	1–0	2–0	0–0	3–1	1–0	3–3	3–0
Dinamo București	4–0	2–1	5–0	2–0	2–1	—	4–2	1–0	4–1	4–1	4–1	2–3	4–2	4–3	3–0	4–1
Farul Constanța	1–0	4–0	2–0	0–3	1–0	1–0	—	1–2	1–0	1–0	1–0	4–1	3–1	2–0	2–1	1–0
Jiul Petroșani	3–1	3–0	1–1	1–0	0–0	0–0	3–0	—	3–0	2–1	2–1	2–1	3–1	1–1	2–0	2–0
Petrolul Ploiești	2–1	2–1	1–0	2–0	0–0	1–0	2–0	1–2	—	4–1	2–1	0–2	0–1	1–0	2–0	1–0
Politehnica Iași	2–1	2–0	1–2	2–0	0–0	1–1	2–0	1–0	1–0	—	2–0	3–1	1–1	2–1	1–0	2–0
Progresul București	2–0	2–0	3–0	1–1	3–1	1–1	0–0	1–0	0–1	1–0	—	1–1	1–3	2–2	2–2	1–0
Rapid București	1–1	1–0	2–0	2–1	2–2	1–0	1–1	3–0	0–0	5–1	0–1	—	2–1	2–1	1–0	2–1
Steaua București	1–1	3–0	2–1	0–1	1–0	0–1	2–0	2–0	2–1	1–2	2–2	2–0	—	0–1	5–3	3–0
UTA Arad	2–1	2–1	3–0	2–0	1–0	3–0	4–0	2–0	2–0	2–0	3–0	1–0	1–1	—	1–0	0–1
Universitatea Cluj	6–0	3–0	4–1	1–1	2–0	0–0	3–0	3–1	5–1	2–0	0–1	2–0	1–0	0–2	—	2–1
Vagonul Arad	3–0	3–1	4–4	4–2	0–0	1–0	3–2	1–1	3–1	2–0	2–1	1–5	1–5	3–5	1–2	—

Legend: Blue = home team win; Yellow = draw; Red = away team win.

== Top goalscorers ==
Rank	Player	Club	Goals
1	Florea Dumitrache	Dinamo București	22
2	Ion Oblemenco	Universitatea Craiova	19
3	Vasile Oprea	Universitatea Cluj	18
4	Alexandru Neagu	Rapid București	17
4	Florea Voinea	Steaua București	17

== Champion squad ==
UTA Arad

Goalkeepers: Gheorghe Gornea (30 / 0).
Defenders: Gavrilă Birău (30 / 0); Ștefan Bakos (30 / 0); Eugen Pojoni (29 / 2); Gheorghe Czako (21 / 0); Ladislau Brosovszky (21 / 1); Viorel Brândescu (6 / 0); Gheorghe Bodea (1 / 0).
Midfielders: Mircea Petescu (27 / 8); Iosif Lereter (30 / 10).
Forwards: Petru Șchiopu (27 / 6); Mircea Axente (29 / 8); Flavius Domide (30 / 8); Ilie Moț (24 / 5); Viorel Sima (7 / 0); Florian Dumitrescu (15 / 2); Ion Atodiresei (2 / 0).
(league appearances and goals listed in brackets)

Manager: Nicolae Dumitrescu.

== See also ==
- 1968–69 Divizia B
- 1968–69 Divizia C
- 1968–69 County Championship
