= Pâncota =

- Town
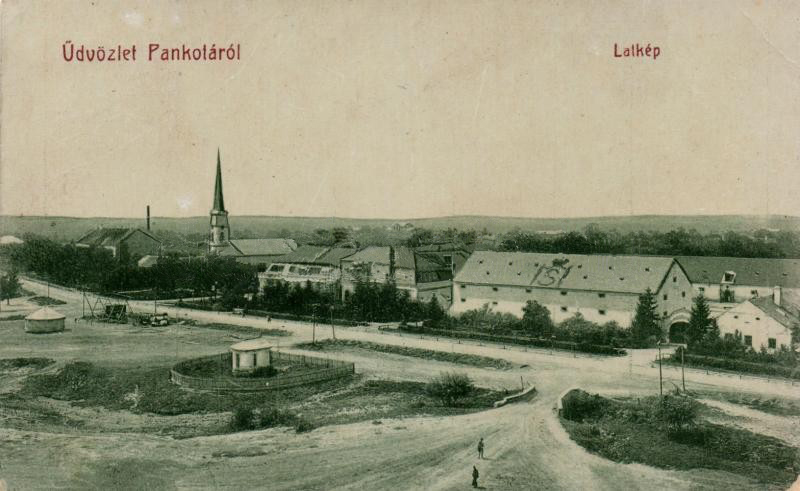
- Dietrich-Sukowsky Castle in Pâncota

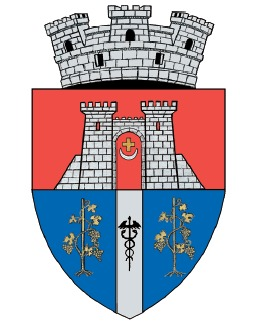
- Coat of arms

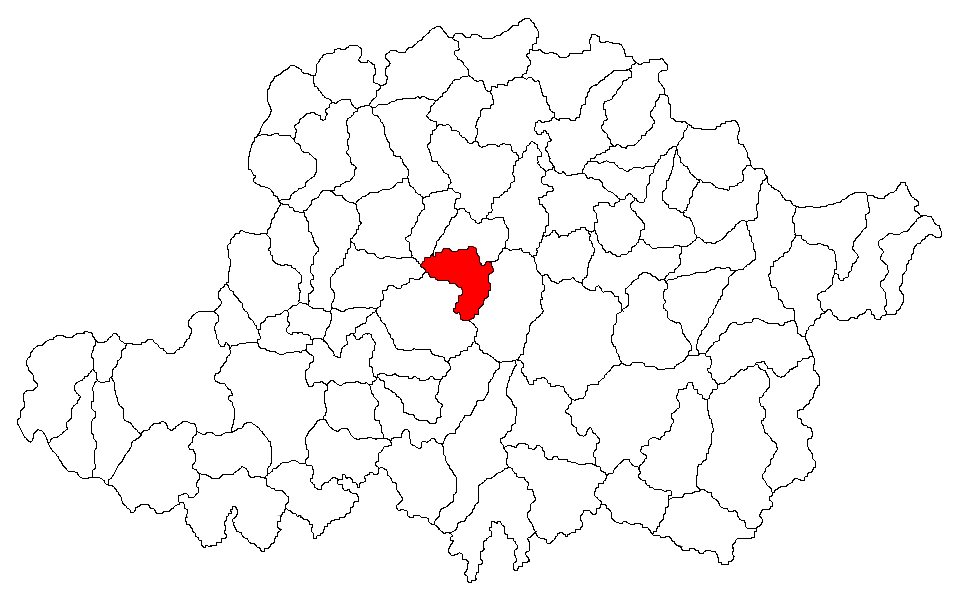
- Location in Arad County

- Location in Romania
- Coordinates: 46°19′21″N 21°41′13″E
- Country: Romania
- County: Arad

Government
  - Mayor (2024–2028): Dan-Ștefan Pocrișer (PSD)
- Area: 66.96 km^{2} (25.85 sq mi)
- Elevation: 192 m (630 ft)
- Population (2021-12-01): 6,787
  - Density: 101.4/km^{2} (262.5/sq mi)
- Time zone: UTC+02:00 (EET)
  - Summer (DST): UTC+03:00 (EEST)
- Postal code: 315600
- Area code: (+40) 02 57
- Vehicle reg.: AR
- Website: primariapancota.ro

Pâncota (Hungarian: Pankota) is a town in Arad County, Crișana, Romania. The town is situated at a 37 km (23 mi) distance from the county seat, Arad, in the central zone of the county, at the contact zone of the Arad Plateau and Zărand Mountains. The administrative territory of the town is 70.9 km^{2} (27.4 sq mi). The town administers one village, Măderat (Magyarád).

== History ==
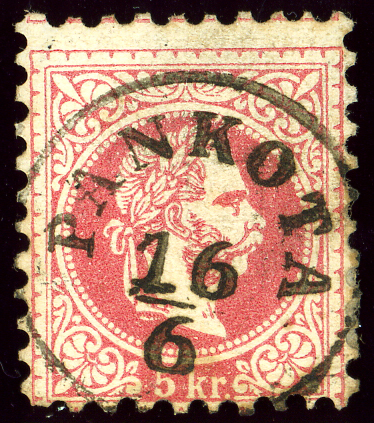
Before the first Hungarian stamps, cancelled 1867-1871

The first mention in documents of the locality dates back to 1202-1203, when it was known as villa Pankota. It remained under Hungarian rule until 1565, when it was conquered by Ottoman forces. By the end of the same year, the Sanjak of Pâncota was created, within the Eyalet of Temeşvar.

The centre of the town was ravaged by invaders several times. The Ottoman Turks captured the town repeatedly. In 1687 it passed under the administration of the Habsburg empire, as confirmed by the Treaty of Karlowitz in 1699.

Until 1918, Pâncota was part of the Austrian monarchy, province of Hungary; in Transleithania after the compromise of 1867 in the Kingdom of Hungary.

The post-office was opened in 1855. The Treaty of Trianon of 1920 attributed the Arad region to Romania (the Great Romanian Union).

== Economy ==
The town's present-day economy can be characterized by a powerful dynamic force with significant developments in all the sectors. Industry of building materials, furniture industry, light industry, food industry, services and tourism are the most representative economic sectors. Pâncota is an important centre of wine growing, in the Măderat region, with the vineyards Pâncota, Silindia, and Mocrea.

== Tourist attractions ==
Among the most significant touristic sights of the town are the urban environs along Tudor Vladimirescu Street, the old post office, the "Sulkowski" palace, the Matca Canal — an important hydrotechnical work and the Green House (Casa verde) situated on the main Boulevard.

== Demographics ==
Historical population
Year	Pop.	±%
1977	7,206	—
1992	7,446	+3.3%
2002	7,418	−0.4%
2011	6,651	−10.3%
2021	6,787	+2.0%
Source: Census data

At the 2021 census, Pâncota had a population of 6,787. At the 2011 census, the town had 6,651 inhabitants; of those, 78.54% were Romanians, 10.91% Roma, 6.63% Hungarians, 2.13% Germans, 0.91% Ukrainians, 0.25% Slovaks, and 0.1% of other or undeclared nationalities.

== Natives ==
- Ilie Moț (1946–1982/83), footballer

== Sources ==
- Fodor, Pál (1999). "Who should obtain the castle of Pankota (1565)? Interest groups and self-promotion in the mid-sixteenth-century Ottoman political establishment". Turcica. 31: 67–86.
