= Gabriel Raksi =

Romanian footballer

Gavril Raksi
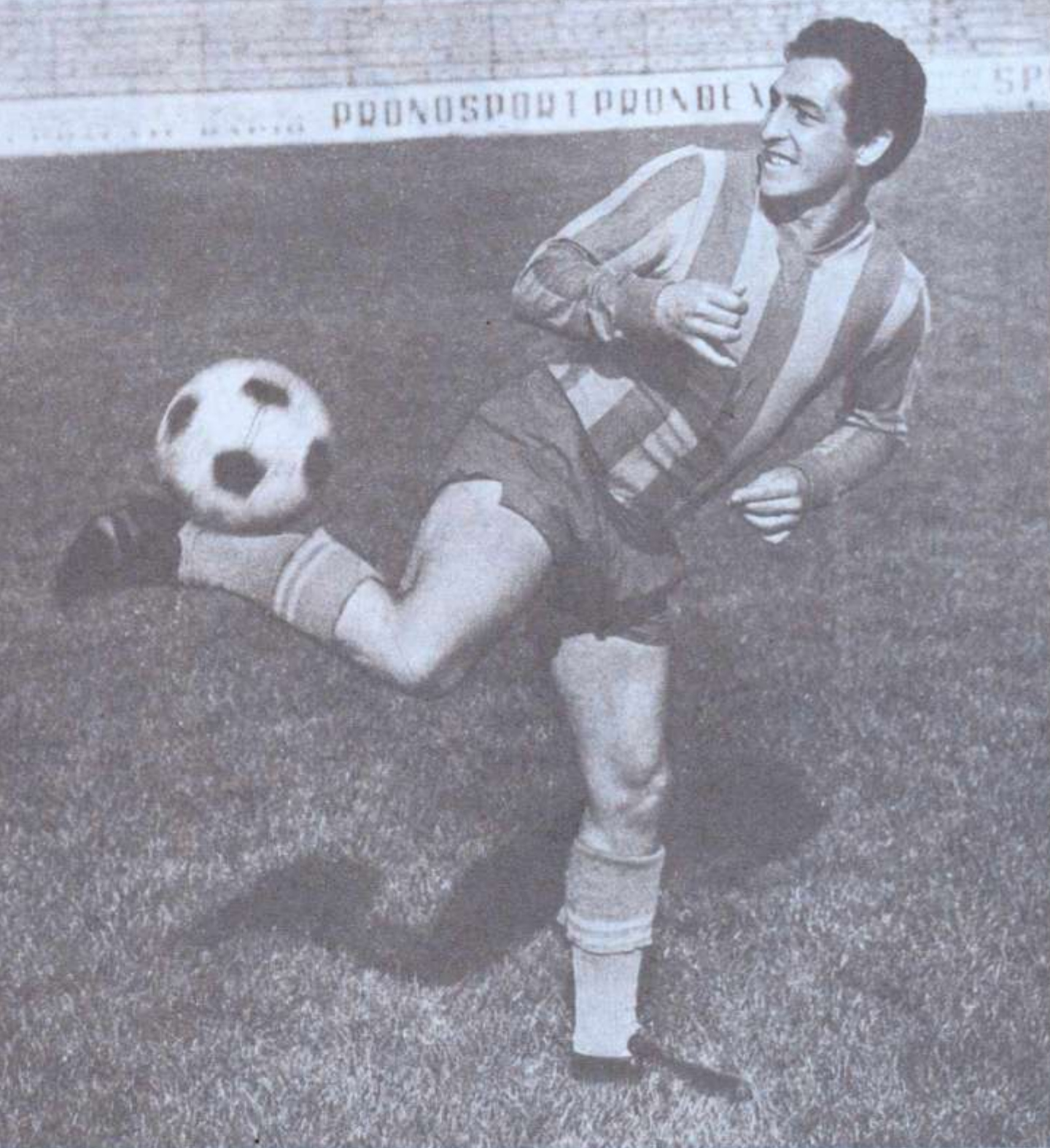

Personal information
- Date of birth: 1 November 1938
- Place of birth: Oradea, Romania
- Date of death: 12 April 2002 (aged 63)
- Place of death: Romania
- Position: Striker

Youth career
- 1951–1956: Metalul Oradea
- 1956–1957: Industria Sârmei Câmpia Turzii

Senior career*
Years	Team	Apps	(Gls)
1957–1958	Industria Sârmei Câmpia Turzii	30	(10)
1958–1967	Steaua București	180	(31)
1967–1969	ASA Târgu Mureş	52	(5)
1969–1972	Progresul București	74	(3)
1972–1973	Metalurgistul Cugir	30	(0)
Total		366	(49)

International career
	Romania U-23	11	(8)
	Romania B	3	(1)
1960–1963	Romania (Note: Including one appearance for Romania's Olympic team.)	3	(0)
- * Club domestic league appearances and goals

Gabriel Raksi (1 November 1938 – 12 April 2002) was a Romanian international football player.

== Career ==
Raksi began his football career in 1951, joining Metalul Oradea. He then joined Industria Sârmei Câmpia Turzii, followed by CCA București in 1959. After his enrollment in Gheorghe Popescu I, the coach of the CCA București team immediately introduced him to the Romanian team. Raksi remained at Steaua (the designation that Steaua București took in 1962) until 1967.

During his time with Steaua, Raksi played two times for the Romanian national football team. He played 7 times for the national youth, and 3 times for Romania B.

In 1967 Raksi left for the ASA Târgu Mureş, as a captain in the Romanian Army. In 1970 when Raksi joined the reserves, he joined the Cotroceni team, Progresul București. The team had remarkable success. When Raksi was 36, he joined Guţă Iancu to defend the flag of the Division B team, Metalurgistul Cugir.

A year later, in 1975, Raksi returned to Bucharest to coach the IMGB București. Between 1976 and 1978 and between 1980 and 1982, Raksi coached Relonul Săvineşti, another team from Division B.

In 1983 he joined Carpaţi Sinaia, then in 1984 Poiana Câmpina. In 1985 he joined Ştiinţa Drăgăneşti in Division C. Afterwards he joined Unirea Alexandria, and between 1987 and 1989 he coached Sticla Arieşul Turda.

After the 1989 Revolution, Raksi stayed in Bucharest and coached lower league sides Onoare, Voinţa and Granitul. In 1993–1994 he made another stop in Viitorul Chirnogi, a team from Division C.

== Honours ==
=== Player ===
==== Club ====
Steaua București

- Romanian League (2): 1959–60, 1960–61
- Romanian Cup (2): 1961–62, 1965–66

Progresul București

- Romanian Second League (1): 1969–70
