= 1970 FIFA World Cup qualification – UEFA Group 1 =

Football tournament qualification stage

The 1970 FIFA World Cup qualification UEFA Group 1 was a UEFA qualifying group for the 1970 FIFA World Cup. The group comprised Greece, Portugal, Romania and Switzerland.

== Standings ==
| Rank | Team | Pld | W | D | L | GF | GA | GD | Pts |
|---|---|---|---|---|---|---|---|---|---|
| 1 | Romania | 6 | 3 | 2 | 1 | 7 | 6 | +1 | 8 |
| 2 | Greece | 6 | 2 | 3 | 1 | 13 | 9 | +4 | 7 |
| 3 | Switzerland | 6 | 2 | 1 | 3 | 5 | 8 | −3 | 5 |
| 4 | Portugal | 6 | 1 | 2 | 3 | 8 | 10 | −2 | 4 |

== Matches ==
12 October 1968

| Switzerland | 1–0 | Greece |
|---|---|---|
| Quentin 22' | Report |

St. Jakob Stadium, Basel
Attendance: 35,778
Referee: Boogaerts (Netherlands)

27 October 1968

| Portugal | 3–0 | Romania |
|---|---|---|
| Jacinto 21', 72'; Jacinto João 33' | Report |

Estádio Nacional, Lisbon
Attendance: 32,222
Referee: Leo Callaghan (Wales)

23 November 1968

| Romania | 2–0 | Switzerland |
|---|---|---|
| Dumitrache 59'; Domide 74' | Report |

Stadionul 23 August, Bucharest
Attendance: 18,854
Referee: Sener (Turkey)

11 December 1968

| Greece | 4–2 | Portugal |
|---|---|---|
| Papaioannou 33'; Dedes 39'; Torres 49' (o.g.); Sideris 61' | Report | José Augusto 17'; Eusébio 64' |

Karaiskakis Stadium, Piraeus
Attendance: 36,759
Referee: Schulenburg (West Germany)

16 April 1969

| Greece | 2–2 | Romania |
|---|---|---|
| Sideris 51'; Dedes 60' | Report | Dumitrache 53', 66' |

Karaiskakis Stadium, Piraeus
Attendance: 37,039
Referee: Antonio Sbardella (Italy)

16 April 1969

| Portugal | 0–2 | Switzerland |
|---|---|---|
| | Report | Vuilleumier 21', 35' |

Estádio José Alvalade, Lisbon
Attendance: 9,324
Referee: Jack Taylor (England)

4 May 1969

| Portugal | 2–2 | Greece |
|---|---|---|
| Eusébio 82'; Peres 86' | Report | Botinos 68'; Elefterakis 74' |

Estádio das Antas, Porto
Attendance: 6,221
Referee: Moncef (Tunisia)

14 May 1969

| Switzerland | 0–1 | Romania |
|---|---|---|
| | Report | Michaud 33' (o.g.) |

Stade olympique de la Pontaise, Lausanne
Attendance: 28,466
Referee: Tiny Wharton (Scotland)

12 October 1969

| Romania | 1–0 | Portugal |
|---|---|---|
| Dobrin 30' | Report |

Stadionul 23 August, Bucharest
Attendance: 58,573
Referee: Čanak (Yugoslavia)

15 October 1969

| Greece | 4–1 | Switzerland |
|---|---|---|
| Koudas 33'; Botinos 39', 49'; Sideris 43' | Report | Künzli 77' |

Kaftanzoglio Stadium, Thessaloniki
Attendance: 47,458
Referee: Paul Schiller (Austria)

2 November 1969

| Switzerland | 1–1 | Portugal |
|---|---|---|
| Künzli 88' | Report | Eusébio 40' |

Wankdorf Stadium, Bern
Attendance: 28,807
Referee: Nilsson (Sweden)

16 November 1969

| Romania | 1–1 | Greece |
|---|---|---|
| Dembrovschi 36' | Report | Domazos 50' |

Stadionul 23 August, Bucharest
Attendance: 62,577
Referee: Adair (Northern Ireland)
