= Viitorul București =

- Full name: Fotbal Club Viitorul București
- Founded: 1962
- Dissolved: 1963
Home colours	Away colours

Viitorul București (English: "Viitorul" = Future) was a Romanian football club from the capital of Romania, Bucharest.

== History ==
Viitorul București was founded in the summer of 1962 and consisted of the Romanian national youth team, who had previously won the UEFA youth tournament in their own country.

Originally, Gheorghe Ola assembled and trained the team who got a place in the highest Romanian League, the Divizia A, which was raised for this purpose on 15 teams without qualification. At the beginning of 1963 Viitorul was ruled out and dissolved in the championship. The players were mostly taken over by other Bucharest teams or returned to their home clubs.

They played in 1962–63 Divizia A, and it was dissolved in mid-season.

== Bibliography ==
- Hardy Grüne (2000), Enzyklopädie der europäischen Fußballvereine (in German) (1. ed.), Kassel: AGON Sportverlag, p. 334, ISBN 3-89784-163-0
- Mihai Ionescu; Răzvan Toma; Mircea Tudoran (2001), Fotbal de la A la Z, Bukarest: Mondocart Pres, p. 197, ISBN 973-8332-00-1
