= 1974 FIFA World Cup qualification – UEFA Group 4 =

Group 4 consisted of four of the 32 teams entered into the European zone: Albania, East Germany, Finland, and Romania. These four teams competed on a home-and-away basis for one of the 9.5 spots in the final tournament allocated to the European zone, with the group's winner claiming the place in the finals.

== Standings ==
Rank	Team	Pld	W	D	L	GF	GA	GD	Pts
1	East Germany	6	5	0	1	18	3	+15	10
2	Romania	6	4	1	1	17	4	+13	9
3	Finland	6	1	1	4	3	21	−18	3
4	Albania	6	1	0	5	3	13	−10	2

== Matches ==
21 June 1972

Finland	1–0	Albania
Toivola 13'	Report

Helsinki, Finland
Referee: Lööw (Sweden)

20 September 1972

Finland	1–1	Romania
Rissanen 86'	Report	Nunweiller 52'

Helsinki, Finland
Referee: Eksztajn (Poland)

7 October 1972

East Germany	5–0	Finland
Kreische 26'; Sparwasser 68', 86'; Streich 70', 76'	Report

Dresden, East Germany
Referee: Radunchev (Bulgaria)

29 October 1972

Romania	2–0	Albania
Dobrin 38'; Dembrovschi 41'	Report

Bucharest, Romania
Referee: Vamvacopoulos (Greece)

8 April 1973

East Germany	2–0	Albania
Streich 62'; Sparwasser 69'	Report

Magdeburg, East Germany
Referee: Helies (France)

6 May 1973

Albania	1–4	Romania
Bizi 87'	Report	Dumitru 12'; Dumitrache 25', 57' (pen.); Țarălungă 72'

Tirana, Albania
Referee: Raus (Yugoslavia)

27 May 1973

Romania	1–0	East Germany
Dumitrache 53'	Report

Bucharest, Romania
Referee: Linemayr (Austria)

6 June 1973

Finland	1–5	East Germany
Manninen 88'	Report	Streich 7', 30'; Löwe 44'; Ducke 75'; Kreische 83'

Tampere, Finland
Referee: Kazakov (Soviet Union)

26 September 1973

East Germany	2–0	Romania
Bransch 42', 64'	Report

Zentralstadion, Leipzig, East Germany
Referee: Scheurer (Switzerland)

10 October 1973

Albania	1–0	Finland
Rragami 25' (pen.)	Report

Tirana, Albania
Referee: Angonese (Italy)

14 October 1973

Romania	9–0	Finland
Dumitru 6'; Marcu 8', 42'; Sandu 25', 65'; Dumitrache 45', 63'; Pantea 55'; Georgescu 81'	Report

Bucharest, Romania
Referee: Emsberger (Hungary)

13 November 1973

Albania	1–4	East Germany
Gjika 15'	Report	Streich 5', 35'; Löwe 62'; Sparwasser 77'

Tirana, Albania
Referee: Bonett (Malta)
