= 1962 UEFA European Under-18 Championship =

Association football tournament

Tournament details
- Host country: Romania
- Dates: 20–29 April
- Teams: 20

Final positions
- Champions: Romania (1st title)
- Runners-up: Yugoslavia
- Third place: Czechoslovakia
- Fourth place: Turkey

The UEFA European Under-18 Championship 1962 Final Tournament was held in Romania.

== Teams ==
The following teams entered the tournament:

- Austria
- Belgium
- Bulgaria
- Czechoslovakia
- East Germany
- England
- France
- West Germany
- Greece
- Hungary
- Italy
- Netherlands
- Poland
- Portugal
- Romania (host)
- Soviet Union
- Spain
- Turkey
- Yugoslavia

The 20th participant was (Romania) Brașov XI.

== Group stage ==
=== Group A ===
Teams	Pld	W	D	L	GF	GA	GD	Pts
Romania	3	1	2	0	5	2	+3	4
Belgium	3	1	2	0	4	3	+1	4
Portugal	3	0	2	1	1	2	–1	2
West Germany	3	0	2	1	2	5	–3	2

20 April	West Germany	1–1	Portugal
	Romania	2–2	Belgium
22 April	West Germany	1–1	Belgium
	Romania	0–0	Portugal
24 April	Belgium	1–0	Portugal
	Romania	3–0	West Germany

=== Group B ===
Teams	Pld	W	D	L	GF	GA	GD	Pts
Yugoslavia	3	1	2	0	5	0	+5	4
Netherlands	3	1	2	0	4	1	+3	4
Bulgaria	3	0	3	0	1	1	0	3
England	3	0	1	2	0	8	–8	1

20 April	Bulgaria	1–1	Netherlands
	Yugoslavia	5–0	England
22 April	Netherlands	3–0	England
	Bulgaria	0–0	Yugoslavia
24 April	Netherlands	0–0	Yugoslavia
	Bulgaria	0–0	England

=== Group C ===
Teams	Pld	W	D	L	GF	GA	GD	Pts
Turkey	3	3	0	0	4	0	+4	6
Hungary	3	2	0	1	3	1	+2	4
France	3	0	1	2	1	4	–3	1
Spain	3	0	1	2	1	4	–3	1

20 April	Turkey	1–0	Hungary
	France	1–1	Spain
22 April	Turkey	2–0	France
	Hungary	2–0	Spain
24 April	Hungary	1–0	France
	Turkey	1–0	Spain

=== Group D1 ===
Teams	Pld	W	D	L	GF	GA	GD	Pts
Italy	3	2	1	0	8	2	+6	5
(Romania) Brașov XI	3	1	2	0	6	4	+2	4
Poland	3	1	1	1	4	6	–2	3
Austria	3	0	0	3	3	9	–6	0

20 April	Italy	3–0	Poland
	Brașov XI (Romania)	3–1	Austria
22 April	Poland	2–1	Austria
	Brașov XI (Romania)	1–1	Italy
24 April	Italy	4–1	Austria
	Brașov XI (Romania)	2–2	Poland

=== Group D2 ===
Teams	Pld	W	D	L	GF	GA	GD	Pts
Czechoslovakia	3	2	1	0	5	2	+3	5
East Germany	3	2	0	1	8	6	+2	4
Soviet Union	3	1	0	2	5	7	–2	2
Greece	3	0	1	2	3	6	–3	1

20 April	East Germany	3–2	Greece
	Czechoslovakia	2–1	Soviet Union
22 April	Czechoslovakia	3–1	East Germany
	Soviet Union	3–1	Greece
24 April	Czechoslovakia	0–0	Greece
	East Germany	4–1	Soviet Union

=== Group D play-off ===
25 April 1962

Czechoslovakia	2 – 1	Italy

Bucharest

== Semifinals ==
27 April 1962

Yugoslavia	6 – 2	Czechoslovakia

Stadionul August 23, Bucharest
27 April 1962

Romania	4 – 0	Turkey
Haidu 16'; Kocatoros 47' (o.g.); Gergely 75'; Matei 78'	Report

Stadionul August 23, Bucharest
Attendance: 60,000
Referee: Marcel Bois (France)

== Third place match ==
29 April 1962

Czechoslovakia	(c) 1 – 1	Turkey
Leníček 58'	Report	Çevrim 25'

Stadionul August 23, Bucharest
Referee: S. Mataiter (Romania)

== Final ==
29 April 1962

Romania	4 – 1	Yugoslavia
Dumitriu 7', 35'; Gergely 17'; Haidu 45'		6' Radosov

Stadionul August 23, Bucharest
Attendance: 75.000
Referee: (Czechoslovakia) Malka

1962 UEFA European Under-18 Championship

Romania
First title
