= Gheorghe Ola =

Romanian football manager (1928–1995)

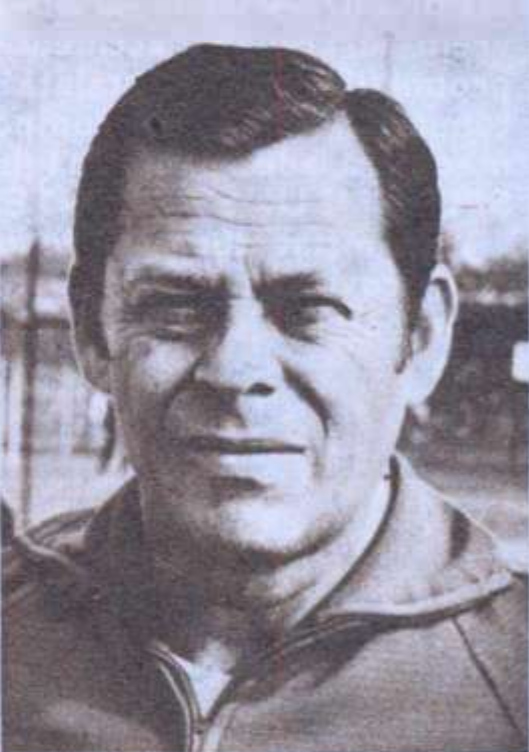
- Ola in 1972

Personal information
- Date of birth: 10 October 1928
- Place of birth: Cluj County, Romania
- Date of death: 1995 (aged 66–67)

Senior career*
| Years | Team | Apps | (Gls) |
| 1942–1945 | Dunărea Craiova | | |
| 1945–1949 | Mureșul Târgu Mureș | | |
| 1949–1952 | Știința București | | |

Managerial career
- 1953–1955: Știința București (youth)
- 1956–1960: Știința București
- 1960–1969: Romania U-18
- 1962: Viitorul București
- 1962–1963: Steaua București (assistant)
- 1963–1964: Steaua București
- 1969–1972: Romania U-21
- 1972: Romania
- 1972–1974: Sportul Studenţesc
- 1974–1975: Șoimii Sibiu
- 1975–1976: Olimpia Satu Mare
- 1977–1978: FC Constanta
- * Club domestic league appearances and goals

Gheorghe Ola (10 October 1928 – 1995) was a Romanian footballer and manager.

== Honours ==
=== Manager ===
Romania

- UEFA European Under-18 Championship: 1962
