= Nicolae Dumitrescu =

Romanian footballer and manager (1921–1999)

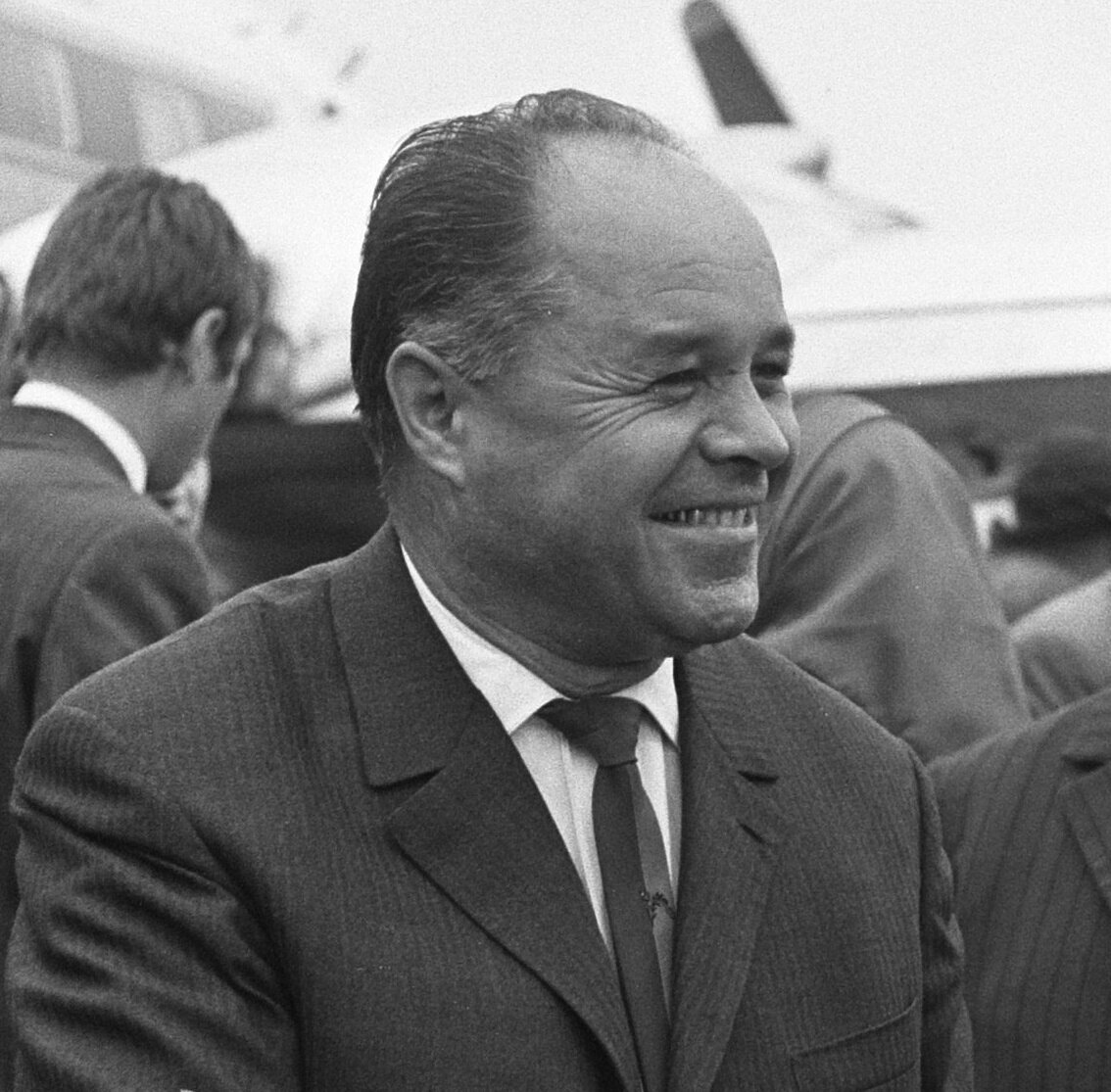
- Dumitrescu at the Zestienhoven airport in 1970

Personal information
- Date of birth: 8 December 1921
- Place of birth: Bucharest, Romania
- Date of death: 17 March 1999 (aged 77)
- Place of death: Arad, Romania
- Height: 1.67 m (5 ft 6 in)
- Position: Forward

Youth career
- Suter București

Senior career*
Years	Team	Apps	(Gls)
1941–1946	Sparta București (Note: The Divizia A 1940–41 was the last season before World War II and the Divizia A 1946–47 was the first one after, so the appearances during this period for Sparta București are not official.)	11	(2)
1946–1955	ITA Arad	164	(51)
Total		175	(53)

International career
1947–1948	Romania	10	(2)

Managerial career
- 1956–1964: UTA Arad (juniors)
- 1962: Romania U18
- 1965–1973: UTA Arad
- 1975–1976: UTA Arad
- 1979: UTA Arad
- 1985–1986: UTA Arad
- 1993–1994: UTA Arad
- * Club domestic league appearances and goals

Nicolae "Coco" Dumitrescu (8 December 1921 – 17 March 1999) was a Romanian football player and manager. He played mainly as a forward and throughout his career, he won four Divizia A titles and two cups with ITA Arad. As a manager, he won two league titles with the same club, also in the 1970–71 European Cup season they eliminated Feyenoord who were European champions at that time. For these performances he is considered a symbol of the club.

== Club career ==
Dumitrescu was born on 8 December 1921 in Bucharest, Romania and began playing football in 1938 at local club Suter. In 1941 he went to Sparta București with whom he played a Cupa României final which was lost with 4–0 to CFR Turnu Severin. In 1946, Dumitrescu joined ITA Arad where he made his Divizia A debut under coach Zoltán Opata on 22 September 1946 in a 1–1 draw against UD Reșița in which he scored a goal. By the end of the season he earned a total of 10 goals in 10 appearances, helping the club win the first title in its history. In the following season, Dumitrescu helped the team win The Double, playing under coach Petre Steinbach in 27 matches in which he netted a personal record of 17 goals. However, he was not the team's top-scorer as Ladislau Bonyhádi scored 49 and Adalbert Kovács scored 19. He also played the entire match in the 3–2 victory in the 1948 Cupa României final against CFR Timișoara. In the 1950 season he won another title with the club, being used by coach Francisc Dvorzsák in 15 matches in which he did not score, also appearing in the Cupa României final which was lost with 3–1 to CCA București. Dumitrescu helped The Old Lady win the 1953 Cupa României, being utilized by coach Coloman Braun-Bogdan in the 1–0 victory against CCA București in the final. Braun-Bogdan further used him in 23 matches in which he scored four goals in the 1954 Divizia A season, where he and the club secured their fourth title together. On 27 November 1955, Dumitrescu made his last Divizia A appearance, playing for ITA in a 2–0 away victory against CCA București, totaling 164 appearances with 51 goals in the competition, all while representing The Old Lady.

== International career ==
Dumitrescu played 10 games and scored two goals for Romania, making his debut under coach Colea Vâlcov on 25 May 1947 in a 4–0 away victory against Albania in the 1947 Balkan Cup, a competition in which he made a total of three appearances. He scored his first goal for the national team in a friendly that ended with a 6–2 loss to Czechoslovakia. He made his last four appearances in the 1948 Balkan Cup in which he netted a goal in a 3–2 home victory against Bulgaria.

=== International goals ===
Scores and results list Romania's goal tally first, score column indicates score after each Dumitrescu goal.

Goal	Date	Venue	Opponent	Score	Result	Competition
1	21 September 1947	Stadionul Giulești, București, Romania	Czechoslovakia	2–3	2–6	Friendly
2	20 June 1948	Stadionul Giulești, București, Romania	Bulgaria	3–2	3–2	1948 Balkan Cup

== Managerial career ==
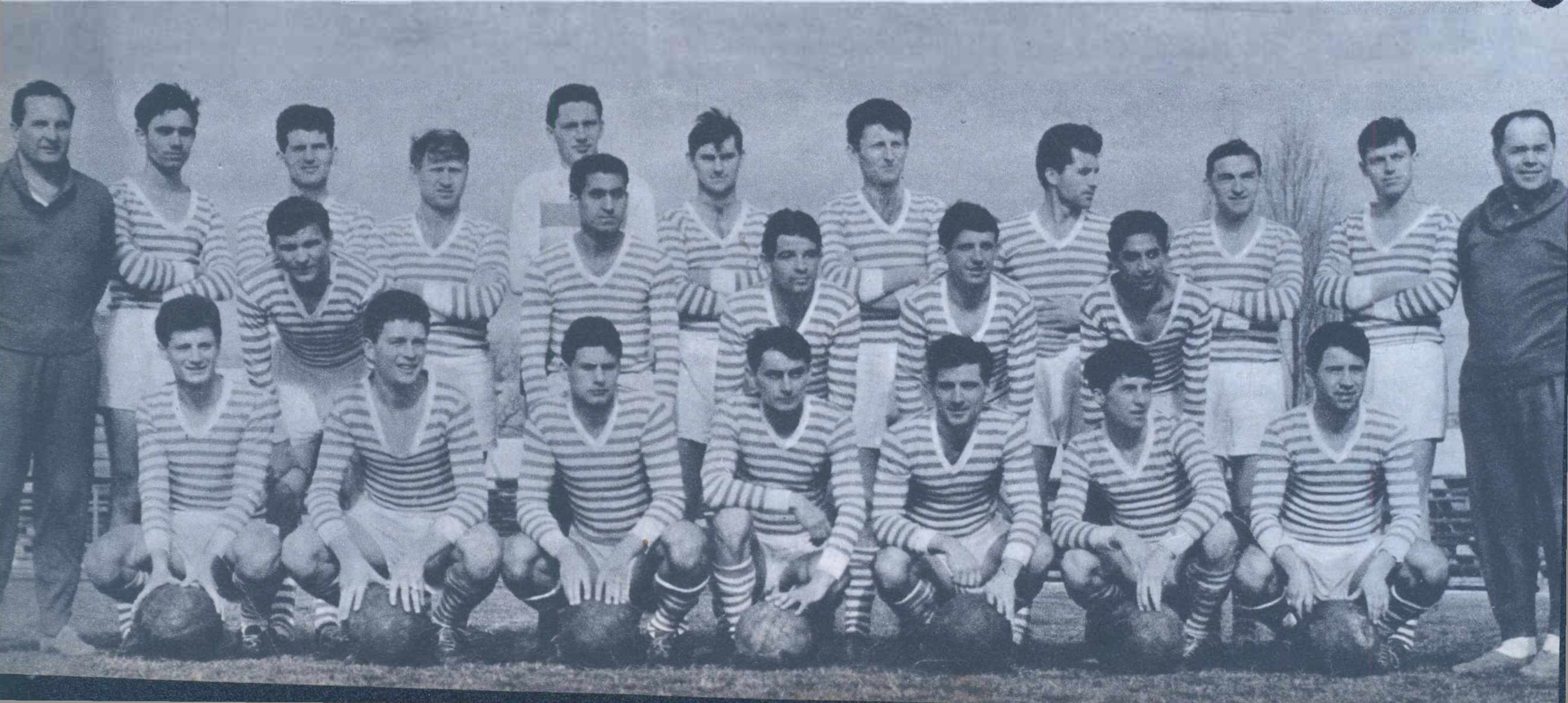
Dumitrescu (pictured far right) with UTA Arad in 1965

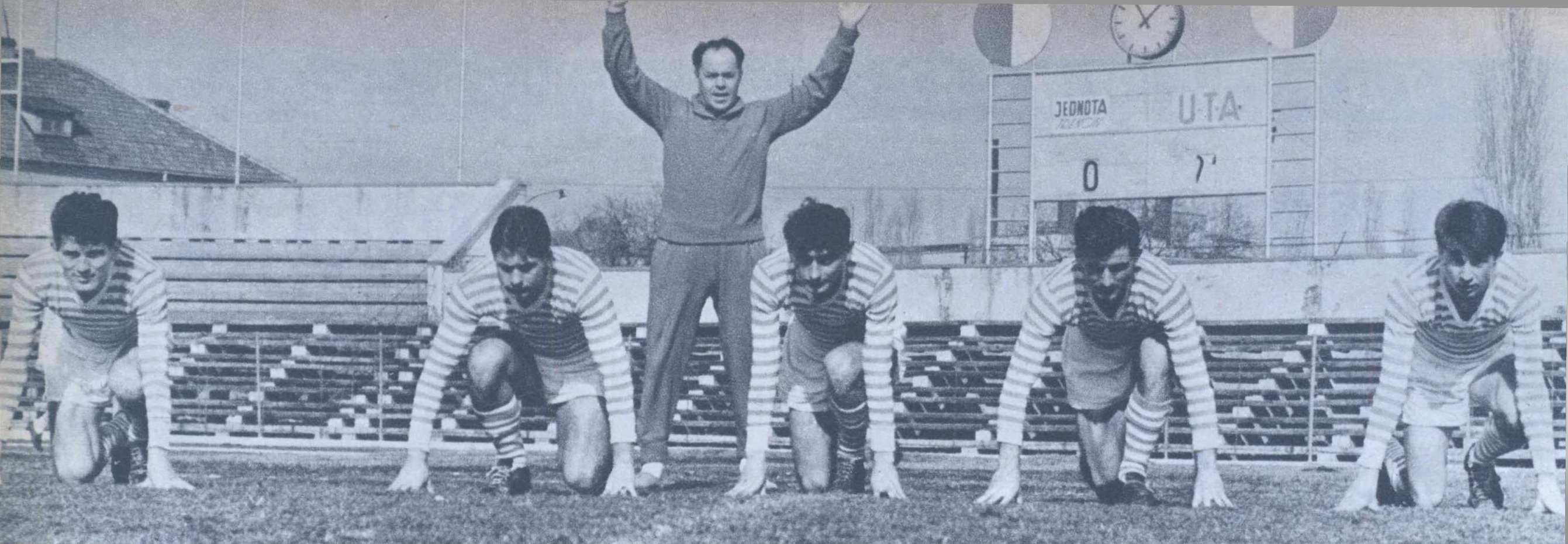
Dumitrescu during a UTA training session

Dumitrescu started his coaching career shortly after he ended his playing career at the junior squads of UTA Arad in 1956 where he stayed until 1964. During this time he reached three national junior championship finals, winning the first two against Dinamo București and Farul Constanța, and losing the third to Rapid București. In these years he discovered and promoted talents such as Mihai Țârlea, Constantin Koszka and his stepbrother, Ion Pârcălab. He also coached Romania's under-18 national team with Gheorghe Ola, winning together the 1962 European championship. In 1965, Dumitrescu became the head coach of UTA's senior squad with whom he reached the 1966 Cupa României final which was lost with 4–0 to Steaua București and won two consecutive Divizia A titles in the 1968–69 and 1969–70 seasons. He also made some European performances with The Old Lady as eliminating Ernst Happel's Feyenoord in the 1970–71 European Cup who were the defending European champions. They also reached the 1971–72 UEFA Cup quarter-finals by eliminating Austria Salzburg, Zagłębie Wałbrzych and Vitória Setúbal, being eliminated by Tottenham Hotspur who eventually won the competition. Dumitrescu coached UTA on several other occasions, having a total of 375 matches as manager in Divizia A, consisting of 154 victories, 80 draws and 141 losses.

== Personal life and death ==
His stepbrother, Ion Pârcălab, was also an international footballer. Dumitrescu died on 17 March 1999, at the age of 77.

Journalist Radu Romănescu wrote a book about Dumitrescu's career titled, Coco Dumitrescu, pentru totdeauna în inima Bătrânei Doamne (English: Coco Dumitrescu, forever in the heart of the Old Lady), which was released on 18 April 2021, the year in which Dumitrescu would have turned 100.

== Honours ==
=== Player ===
Sparta București

- Cupa României runner-up: 1942–43

ITA Arad

- Divizia A: 1946–47, 1947–48, 1950, 1954
- Cupa României: 1947–48, 1953, runner-up 1950

=== Manager ===
Romania U18

- UEFA European Under-18 Championship: 1962

UTA Arad

- Divizia A: 1968–69, 1969–70
- Cupa României runner-up: 1965–66
