= 1965–66 Cupa României =

Tournament details
- Country: Romania

Final positions
- Champions: Steaua București
- Runners-up: UTA Arad

The 1965–66 Cupa României was the 28th edition of Romania's most prestigious football cup competition.

The title was won by Steaua București against UTA Arad.

== Format ==
The competition is an annual knockout tournament.

In the first round proper, two pots were made, first pot with Divizia A teams and other teams till 16 and the second pot with the rest of teams qualified in this phase. Each tie is played as a single leg.

First round proper matches are played on the ground of the lowest ranked team, then from the second round proper the matches are played on a neutral location.

In the first round proper, if a match is drawn after 90 minutes, the game goes in extra time, and if the scored is still tight after 120 minutes, the team who played away will qualify.

From the second round proper, if a match is drawn after 90 minutes, the game goes in extra time, and if the scored is still tight after 120 minutes, then the younger team (the lower average of players age) will qualify.

From the first edition, the teams from Divizia A entered in competition in sixteen finals, rule which remained till today.

== First round proper ==
Team 1	Score	Team 2
9 March 1966
Victoria Călan (Div. C)	0–3	(Div. A) Steaua București
13 March 1966
AS Aiud (Div. C)	3–1	(Div. A) Știința Craiova
Vagonul Arad (Div. B)	1–2	(Div. A) Dinamo București
Dinamo Bacău (Div. B)	0–1	(Div. A) CSMS Iași
Minerul Baia Mare (Div. B)	2–2 (a.e.t.)	(Div. A) Petrolul Ploiești
Metalurgistul București (Div. B)	1–2	(Div. A) Steagul Roșu Brașov
Dunărea Calafat (Div. D)	0–4	(Div. A) Universitatea Cluj
Clujeana Cluj (Div. B)	3–1	(Div. B) Progresul București
Foresta Fălticeni (Div. C)	0–3	(Div. A) Farul Constanța
Fructexport Focșani (Div. C)	0–4	(Div. A) Siderurgistul Galați
Cimentul Medgidia (Div. D)	3–1	(Div. A) Știința Timișoara
Petrolul Moinești (Div. C)	0–1	(Div. C) Soda Ocna Mureș
Jiul Petrila (Div. B)	1–1 (a.e.t.)	(Div. A) Rapid București
Metalul Plopeni (Div. D)	1–0	(Div. A) Dinamo Pitești
CSM Sibiu (Div. B)	0–2	(Div. A) UTA Arad
Știința Târgu Mureș (Div. D)	1–3	(Div. A) ASA Crișul Oradea

== Second round proper ==
Team 1	Score	Team 2
11 May 1966
Rapid București	2–0	CSMS Iași
UTA Arad	2–0	Cimentul Medgidia
Farul Constanța	3–2 (a.e.t.)	Metalul Plopeni
ASA Crișul Oradea	3–2	AS Aiud
Steagul Roșu Brașov	1–0	Clujeana Cluj
Dinamo București	3–1 (a.e.t.)	Universitatea Cluj
Petrolul Ploiești	1–0 (a.e.t.)	Siderurgistul Galați
Steaua București	2–0	Soda Ocna Mureș

== Quarter-finals ==
Team 1	Score	Team 2
22 June 1966
Farul Constanța	2–1	Steagul Roșu Brașov
Steaua București	2–0	Dinamo București
UTA Arad	2–1	ASA Crișul Oradea
Rapid București	2–0	Petrolul Ploiești

== Semi-finals ==
Team 1	Score	Team 2
13 July 1966
Steaua București	3–0	Rapid București
UTA Arad	3–2	Farul Constanța

== Final ==
17 July 1966
17:30 EET

Steaua București	4–0	UTA Arad
Raksi 63', 70'; Voinea 75'; Sătmăreanu 88'	Report

23 August, Bucharest
Attendance: 30,000
Referee: Erwin Vetter (GDR)
