= West derby (Romania) =

Football rivalry in Romania

West Derby
- Other names: UTA vs Poli
- Location: (Romania) Crișana/Banat
- Teams: SSU Politehnica Timișoara and UTA Arad
- First meeting: ITA Arad 2–0 CSU Timișoara; 1948–49 Divizia A (29 August 1948)
- Latest meeting: UTA Arad 1–0 Politehnica Timișoara; 2019–20 Liga II (20 October 2019)
- Next meeting: Politehnica Timișoara – UTA Arad; 2019–20 Liga II (25 April 2019)

Statistics
- Total meetings: 78
- Most wins: UTA Arad (33)

The West Derby (Romanian: Derbiul Vestului) is a match between the fierce rivals SSU Politehnica Timișoara and UTA Arad, the biggest and most popular football clubs in western Romania.

== History ==
At first glance, the reasons for rivalry between Timișoara and Arad are multiple. To begin with, it is the rivalry between the cities, both with a rich economic and cultural activity. Then it would be the postwar period, when, in administrative terms, Arad destiny was decided by Timișoara. In football, the two cities dispute the status of pioneer in Romanian football. All these aspects have contributed to today's enmity, between Poli and UTA. A decisive episode, however, occurred in 1964.

The flame that lit irreversible the rivalry between Poli and UTA was their match on 16 May 1964 in Timișoara. Both teams were hungry for points and the pressure was greater on the shoulders of Timișoara players, who were in a tough situation, the bottom of the table. Over 25,000 spectators stormed the new stadium on May 16, a stadium that was not completely built.

On UTA's bench was Coloman Braun-Bogdan aka "Csibi", a coach that a year before finished in 3rd place with Timișoara. After a quarrel with Remus Lazăr and Nelu Igna, he had been removed from the team and took over UTA. So it is understandable that the famous coach had to pay some "debts".

"Csibi not come alone, but with the referee Lulu Mihăilescu. They have scored a goal from offside, led us, and when we equalized at 3–3, Lereter scored, but the referee cancelled the goal. When people saw that, they triggered the scandal", remember, many years ago, Cicerone Manolache, one of the protagonists of that match. Then followed a bombing rocks on the lockers. The police intervened, but viewers could not be calmed so easy. Witnesses said that one of the police cars was overthrown by Druckers (Poli fans). The whole incident was left with arrests and expulsions for students who actively participated in the scandal.

Timișoara stadium was suspended, they disputed their last home matches in exile, at Reșița. At the end of that edition of the championship, Știința Timișoara relegated.

In the last 20 years, both teams faced financial problems, so the meetings between them becoming rarer, but perhaps more explosive. Firstly FC Politehnica Timișoara, it was the one who had financial problems in the early 2000s. Then Timișoara recovered and returns in the first league through an alliance with AEK București, they became for a short period Politehnica AEK Timișoara. But 2000s did not have to be gentle with their great rival, UTA Arad, as well. They played mostly in the second league except the moment when promoted instead of Liberty Salonta, which promoted on the pitch, but sold its place. Then in the early 2010s, both teams arrived in the second league. Then in 2012 FC Politehnica Timișoara went bankrupt and it was followed by her biggest rival UTA Arad, two years later, in 2014. If at Arad the team started from Liga IV, being supported by everyone and holding the old team record and logo, at Timișoara things had to be more complicated. After the dissolution of FC Politehnica Timișoara in 2012, appeared 2 teams. ACS Poli Timișoara, former ACS Recaș which was moved from Recaș to Timișoara and inheriting the old team record, a team that is supported by local authorities. The second one is SSU Politehnica Timișoara, a team supported by the fans of Poli (Druckeria), who started its road from Liga V. UTA fans consider SSU Politehnica Timișoara as their real rival because it is supported by FC Politehnica Timișoara fans.

On 13 November 2016, UTA and Poli met again, for the first time in this new format. The match end draw but UTA Arad had possession and occasions. Even though UTA controlled the match from the beginning to end, Poli managed to score the opening goal. Later, UTA scored and the match ended 1-1.

== Statistics ==
As of 4 May 2019

Competition	Played	Politehnica wins	Draws	UTA wins	Politehnica goals	UTA goals
Divizia A / Liga I	52	15	16	21	65	78
Divizia B / Liga II	25	10	5	10	32	35
Cupa României	1	0	0	1	1	4
Total	78	25	21	33	98	117

== Meetings ==
All-known meetings:

Date	Venue	Home team	Score	Away team	Goals (home)	Goals (away)	Competition
29 August 1948	Francisc von Neumann	ITA Arad	2–0	Politehnica Timișoara	Karpinetz (7, 9)	–	Divizia A
20 March 1949	Știința	CSU Timișoara	0–0	ITA Arad	–	–	Divizia A
4 June 1950	Francisc von Neumann	Flamura Roșie Arad	4–0	CSU Timișoara	Capas (4), Mercea (44, 62), Boitoș (87)	–	Divizia A
29 October 1950	Știința	Știința Timișoara	2–1	Flamura Roșie Arad	Morja (25), Pall (44 o.g.)	Reinhardt (75)	Divizia A
25 March 1951	Francisc von Neumann	Flamura Roșie Arad	2–2	Știința Timișoara	Dumitrescu (51), Pecsovszky (88)	Boroș (46, 62)	Divizia A
26 August 1951	Știința	Știința Timișoara	0–3	Flamura Roșie Arad	Boitoș (30), Covaci (75), Mercea (76)	–	Divizia A
19 April 1953	Știința	Știința Timișoara	0–0	Flamura Roșie Arad	–	–	Divizia A
4 October 1953	Francisc von Neumann	Flamura Roșie Arad	2–0	Știința Timișoara	Mercea (16), Váczi (69)	–	Divizia A
21 October 1953	Știința	Știința Timișoara	1–4	Flamura Roșie Arad			Cupa României
16 June 1954	Francisc von Neumann	Flamura Roșie Arad	1–1	Știința Timișoara	Don (26)	Ciosescu (10)	Divizia A
27 October 1954	Știința	Știința Timișoara	4–0	Flamura Roșie Arad	Ciosescu (8, 15, 80), Cojereanu (71 pen.)	–	Divizia A
20 March 1955	Francisc von Neumann	Flamura Roșie Arad	1–0	Știința Timișoara	Ioanovici (72)	–	Divizia A
28 August 1955	Știința	Știința Timișoara	1–4	Flamura Roșie Arad	R. Lazăr (82)	Capas (18), Birău (32), Pecsovszky (85, 87)	Divizia A
1 July 1956	Francisc von Neumann	Flamura Roșie Arad	1–2	Știința Timișoara	Boitoș (56)	Dinulescu (40), Ciosescu (64)	Divizia A
11 November 1956	Știința	Știința Timișoara	3–2	Flamura Roșie Arad	Ciosescu (3, 58), Gârleanu (85)	Pecsovszky (10), Jurcă (15)	Divizia A
8 September 1957	Francisc von Neumann	Flamura Roșie Arad	3–3	Știința Timișoara	Jurcă (23, 59), Mercea (24)	Ciosescu (52, 67), Dușan (81 o.g.)	Divizia A
20 April 1958	Știința	Știința Timișoara	2–2	Flamura Roșie Arad	Gârleanu (29), Cădariu (57)	Matias (18), Țârlea I (20)	Divizia A
21 September 1958	Francisc von Neumann	UTA Arad	1–1	Știința Timișoara	Igna (59)	Zaharia (58)	Divizia A
29 March 1959	Știința	Știința Timișoara	1–2	UTA Arad	Filip (65 pen.)	Țârlea I (12, 80)	Divizia A
13 October 1960	Știința	Știința Timișoara	2–3	UTA Arad	Gârleanu (18), Manolache (56)	Pecsovszky (2), Metskas (22), Tăucean (53)	Divizia A
23 April 1961	Francisc von Neumann	UTA Arad	1–1	Știința Timișoara	Czako (8)	Lereter (41)	Divizia A
3 September 1961	Știința	Știința Timișoara	1–0	UTA Arad	R. Lazăr (53)	–	Divizia A
1 April 1962	Francisc von Neumann	UTA Arad	1–1	Știința Timișoara	Mir. Sasu (77)	Lereter (50)	Divizia A
28 November 1962	Francisc von Neumann	UTA Arad	3–2	Știința Timișoara	Leac (29), Chivu (40), Mir. Sasu (81)	Bîtlan (14, 20)	Divizia A
21 April 1963	Știința	Știința Timișoara	1–1	UTA Arad	Mițaru (3)	Mir. Sasu (30)	Divizia A
20 October 1963	Francisc von Neumann	UTA Arad	2–1	Știința Timișoara	Tomeș (23), Țârlea I (55)	Surdan (90)	Divizia A
17 May 1964	1 Mai	Știința Timișoara	3–3	UTA Arad	Mițaru (28), Manolache (30), Lereter (75)	Țârlea I (9), Tomeș (23, 76)	Divizia A
5 September 1965	Francisc von Neumann	UTA Arad	0–0	Știința Timișoara	–	–	Divizia A
10 April 1966	1 Mai	Politehnica Timișoara	1–0	UTA Arad	Lereter (25)	–	Divizia A
9 November 1966	Francisc von Neumann	UTA Arad	5–2	Politehnica Timișoara	Șchiopu (5, 19, 56), Tr. Popescu (14, 44)	Mihăilă (61), Popanică (86)	Divizia A
28 May 1967	1 Mai	Politehnica Timișoara	4–2	UTA Arad	Cotormani (54), Regep (67), Lereter (74 pen.), Mureșan (82)	Jac (31), Țârlea I (89 pen.)	Divizia A
9 December 1973	Francisc von Neumann	UTA Arad	3–0	Politehnica Timișoara	Kun (23), Brosovszky (42), Domide (87)	–	Divizia A
19 June 1974	1 Mai	Politehnica Timișoara	1–3	UTA Arad	Bojin (16)	Trandafilon (3, 69), Leac (71)	Divizia A
10 November 1974	1 Mai	Politehnica Timișoara	0–0	UTA Arad	–	–	Divizia A
18 May 1975	Francisc von Neumann	UTA Arad	2–0	Politehnica Timișoara	Brosovszky (65 pen., 70)	–	Divizia A
23 November 1975	1 Mai	Politehnica Timișoara	3–0	UTA Arad	Anghel (33), Dembrovschi (74), Petrescu (80)	–	Divizia A
9 June 1976	Francisc von Neumann	UTA Arad	2–1	Politehnica Timișoara	Colnic (12), Brosovszky (29)	Floareș (62)	Divizia A
10 October 1976	1 Mai	Politehnica Timișoara	2–1	UTA Arad	Dembrovschi (11 pen.), Roșca (89)	Nedelcu (63)	Divizia A
15 May 1977	Francisc von Neumann	UTA Arad	2–1	Politehnica Timișoara	Leac (29), Brosovszky (84)	Lața (75)	Divizia A
12 October 1977	1 Mai	Politehnica Timișoara	1–1	UTA Arad	Lața (54 pen.)	Brosovszky (20)	Divizia A
23 April 1978	Francisc von Neumann	UTA Arad	2–1	Politehnica Timișoara	Brosovszky (11), Coraș (16)	Anghel (9)	Divizia A
28 October 1978	Francisc von Neumann	UTA Arad	1–0	Politehnica Timișoara	Brosovszky (26)	–	Divizia A
25 April 1979	1 Mai	Politehnica Timișoara	1–0	UTA Arad	Cotec (15)	–	Divizia A
14 October 1981	1 Mai	Politehnica Timișoara	0–0	UTA Arad	–	–	Divizia A
17 April 1982	Francisc von Neumann	UTA Arad	0–0	Politehnica Timișoara	–	–	Divizia A
18 September 1983	Francisc von Neumann	UTA Arad	1–2	Politehnica Timișoara	Țârlea II (3)	Anghel (53), Vlătănescu (63)	Divizia B
1 April 1984	1 Mai	Politehnica Timișoara	3–0	UTA Arad	Giuchici (32, 35), Ad. Manea (78)	–	Divizia B
16 November 1986	1 Mai	Politehnica Timișoara	4–2	UTA Arad	Vușcan (7), Bolba (28, 55), Sabou (50)	Lucaci (11, 22)	Divizia B
7 June 1987	Francisc von Neumann	UTA Arad	0–2	Politehnica Timișoara	–	Bobaru (25), Bolba (70)	Divizia B
11 November 1988	1 Mai	Politehnica Timișoara	3–1	UTA Arad	Ionuț (8), Vlaicu (59), Varga (87)	Mulțescu (42)	Divizia B
12 March 1989	Francisc von Neumann	UTA Arad	2–3	Politehnica Timișoara	Petrescu (1, 74)	Trăistaru (30), Oloșutean (35), Varga (64)	Divizia B
11 September 1993	Francisc von Neumann	UTA Arad	1–0	Politehnica Timișoara	A. Ungur (37)	–	Divizia A
27 February 1994	1 Mai	Politehnica Timișoara	1–0	UTA Arad	Varga (83 pen.)	–	Divizia A
6 September 1997	Francisc von Neumann	UTA Arad	1–3	Politehnica Timișoara	Volocaru (90)	Stoican (14), Ibrahim (75), Călin (81)	Divizia B
28 March 1998	Dan Păltinișanu	Politehnica Timișoara	1–1	UTA Arad	Mar. Sasu (52)	Ad. Baciu (50)	Divizia B
5 September 1998	Francisc von Neumann	UTA Arad	1–1	Politehnica Timișoara	Cl. Drăgan (61)	Stoican (4)	Divizia B
7 April 1999	Dan Păltinișanu	Politehnica Timișoara	1–2	UTA Arad	Codrea (12)	Mariș (25), Cl. Drăgan (46)	Divizia B
27 October 1999	Francisc von Neumann	UTA Arad	1–0	Politehnica Timișoara	Cr. Todea (66)	–	Divizia B
3 May 2000	Dan Păltinișanu	Politehnica Timișoara	2–0	UTA Arad	Stupar (45), Naidin (90)	–	Divizia B
18 October 2000	Dan Păltinișanu	Politehnica Timișoara	0–1	UTA Arad	–	Cr. Todea (52)	Divizia B
12 May 2001	Francisc von Neumann	UTA Arad	0–0	Politehnica Timișoara	–	–	Divizia B
13 October 2001	Dan Păltinișanu	Politehnica Timișoara	1–2	UTA Arad	Benga (86)	Miculescu (38, 43)	Divizia B
11 May 2002	Francisc von Neumann	UTA Arad	7–0	Politehnica Timișoara	Drida (4), Fritea (11), Miculescu (12, 43), Ciubăncan (48), Ianu (51, 61)	–	Divizia B
5 October 2002	Dan Păltinișanu	Politehnica Timișoara	3–4	UTA Arad	M. Oprea (1, 68), R. Stancu (39)	Constantinovici (51, o.g.), N'Jock (62), Manta (77), Chițescu (90+2)	Divizia A
16 April 2003	Francisc von Neumann	UTA Arad	0–1	Politehnica Timișoara	–	M. Oprea (30)	Divizia A
18 November 2006	Dan Păltinișanu	Politehnica Timișoara	2–0	UTA Arad	Pleșan (25), Mansour (74)	–	Liga I
18 May 2007	Francisc von Neumann	UTA Arad	2–1	Politehnica Timișoara	Hora (27), Edson (55)	Bucur (50)	Liga I
1 September 2007	Francisc von Neumann	UTA Arad	2–3	Politehnica Timișoara	Cr. Todea (26), Bălțoi (49)	Bucur (4, 12, 89)	Liga I
15 March 2008	Dan Păltinișanu	Politehnica Timișoara	2–0	UTA Arad	Arm. Karamyan (23), Abiodun (62)	–	Liga I
30 September 2011	Francisc von Neumann	UTA Arad	0–0	Politehnica Timișoara	–	–	Liga II
20 April 2012	Dan Păltinișanu	Politehnica Timișoara	0–1	UTA Arad	–	Galanis (11)	Liga II
13 November 2016	Motorul	UTA Arad	1–1	Politehnica Timișoara	Andor (88)	Blănaru (70)	Liga II
21 May 2017	Dan Păltinișanu	Politehnica Timișoara	0–3	UTA Arad	–	Curtuiuș (30), Gligor (33), Piccioni (90+2)	Liga II
15 October 2017	Dan Păltinișanu	Politehnica Timișoara	2–1	UTA Arad	Predescu (3), Bilia (62)	Asani (9)	Liga II
24 April 2018	Otto Greffner	UTA Arad	3–0 (forfait)‡	Politehnica Timișoara	–	–	Liga II
27 October 2018	Dan Păltinișanu	Politehnica Timișoara	1–3	UTA Arad	Bozian (67 pen.)	Janos (14, 40), Rus (87)	Liga II
4 May 2019	Motorul	UTA Arad	0–2	Politehnica Timișoara	–	Ignea (10), Al. Manea (71)	Liga II
21 October 2019	Motorul	UTA Arad	1–0	Politehnica Timișoara	Rus (49)	–	Liga II

Notes:

- ‡ UTA Arad won the match disputed on 24 April 2018 by (forfait), after SSU Politehnica Timișoara players have retired from the pitch in the 62nd minute, at the score of 0-0, as a protest for the fact that only 70 supporters of Politehnica were allowed on the stadium.
