= 1966–67 Balkans Cup =

Tournament details
- Country: Balkans
- Teams: 8

Final positions
- Champions: (Turkey) Fenerbahçe
- Runners-up: (Greece) AEK Athens

Tournament statistics
- Matches played: 27
- Goals scored: 77 (2.85 per match)

The 1966–67 Balkans Cup was an edition of the Balkans Cup, a football competition for representative clubs from the Balkan states. It was contested by 8 teams and Fenerbahçe won the trophy. Fenerbahçe striker Ogün Altıparmak later stated that he had used doping before the final.

2 December 1971 Hürriyet newspaper headline quoting Ogün Altıparmak: “I also used doping”, with additional remarks about taking a pill before the AEK match and players requesting drugs before national team matches.

== Group A ==
Pos	Team	Pld	W	D	L	GF	GA	GR	Pts	Qualification
1	(Turkey) Fenerbahçe (A)	6	4	0	2	10	6	1.667	8	Advances to finals
2	(Albania) Partizani Tirana	6	4	0	2	10	7	1.429	8	
3	(Bulgaria) Cherno More Varna	6	3	0	3	8	7	1.143	6	
4	(Romania) UTA Arad	6	1	0	5	4	12	0.333	2	

Source: rsssf.com
Rules for classification: 1) points; 2) goal average; 3) number of goals scored
(A) Advance to a further round
1 June 1966

Partizani Tirana (Albania)	2–0	(Bulgaria) Cherno More Varna
Shehu 49'; Haxhiu 70'

Qemal Stafa, Tirana
Attendance: 25,000

15 June 1966

Cherno More Varna (Bulgaria)	3–1	(Romania) UTA Arad
N. Dimitrov 12', 62'; Mitev 24'		Șchiopu 89'

Yuri Gagarin, Varna

29 June 1966

Cherno More Varna (Bulgaria)	3–1	(Albania) Partizani Tirana
Yanev 54'; Bogomilov 59', 71'		Pano 69'

Yuri Gagarin, Varna

4 July 1966

UTA Arad (Romania)	1–2	(Albania) Partizani Tirana
Țârlea 62' (pen.)		Pano 48', 54'

Francisc von Neuman, Arad

5 October 1966

Cherno More Varna (Bulgaria)	0–1	(Turkey) Fenerbahçe
		Açıkgöz 61'

Yuri Gagarin, Varna

26 October 1966

Fenerbahçe (Turkey)	3–1	(Romania) UTA Arad
Mumcuoğlu 30', 37', 63'		Țârlea 72'

Şükrü Saracoğlu, Istanbul

2 November 1966

Fenerbahçe (Turkey)	3–0	(Bulgaria) Cherno More Varna
Altıparmak 8', 71'; Mumcuoğlu 17'

Şükrü Saracoğlu, Istanbul

3 December 1966

Partizani Tirana (Albania)	2–0	(Romania) UTA Arad

Dinamo, Tirana

19 March 1967

UTA Arad (Romania)	0–2	(Bulgaria) Cherno More Varna
		Bogomilov 85', 89'

Francisc von Neuman, Arad

13 August 1967

UTA Arad (Romania)	1–0	(Turkey) Fenerbahçe
Lereter 75'

Francisc von Neuman, Arad

26 August 1967

Partizani Tirana (Albania)	2–0	(Turkey) Fenerbahçe
Tanalot 15', 44'

Dinamo, Tirana

3 September 1967

Fenerbahçe (Turkey)	3–2	(Albania) Partizani Tirana
Doğan 37'; Saner 76'; Çika 88' (o.g.)		Rudi 17'; Pano 41'

Şükrü Saracoğlu, Istanbul

== Group B ==
Pos	Team	Pld	W	D	L	GF	GA	GR	Pts	Qualification
1	(Greece) AEK Athens (A)	6	3	3	0	10	5	2.000	9	Advances to finals
2	(Bulgaria) Lokomotiv Sofia	6	2	2	2	11	10	1.100	6	
3	(Romania) Farul Constanța	6	2	1	3	8	14	0.571	5	
4	(Socialist Federal Republic of Yugoslavia) FK Vardar	6	1	2	3	6	6	1.000	4	

Source: rsssf.com
Rules for classification: 1) points; 2) goal average; 3) number of goals scored
(A) Advance to a further round
1 March 1966

Lokomotiv Sofia (Bulgaria)	3–3	(Greece) AEK Athens
Georgiev 27'; Mihalyov 77'; Debarski 78'	Report	Papaioannou 37'; Nikolaidis 47'; Karafeskos 71'

Balgarska Armia, Sofia
Attendance: 30,000
Referee: Vladimir Stanković (Yugoslavia)

6 April 1966

Lokomotiv Sofia (Bulgaria)	1–0	(Socialist Federal Republic of Yugoslavia) FK Vardar

Balgarska Armia, Sofia

8 June 1966

AEK Athens (Greece)	1–0	(Bulgaria) Lokomotiv Sofia
Papaioannou 68'	Report

AEK Stadium, Athens
Attendance: 15,000
Referee: Stelios Mavrogenis (Cyprus)

22 June 1966

FK Vardar (Socialist Federal Republic of Yugoslavia)	1–1	(Bulgaria) Lokomotiv Sofia

Gradski, Skopje

5 July 1966

Farul Constanța (Romania)	4–1	(Bulgaria) Lokomotiv Sofia

Farul, Constanța

2 November 1966

Farul Constanța (Romania)	2–0	(Socialist Federal Republic of Yugoslavia) FK Vardar

Farul, Constanța

16 November 1966

FK Vardar (Socialist Federal Republic of Yugoslavia)	4–0	(Romania) Farul Constanța

Gradski, Skopje

14 December 1966

AEK Athens (Greece)	3–0	(Romania) Farul Constanța
Pomonis 16'; Papaioannou 19', 85'	Report

AEK Stadium, Athens
Attendance: 5,000

29 March 1967

Lokomotiv Sofia (Bulgaria)	5–1	(Romania) Farul Constanța

Balgarska Armia, Sofia

19 April 1967

AEK Athens (Greece)	1–0	(Socialist Federal Republic of Yugoslavia) FK Vardar
Papageorgiou 50'	Report

AEK Stadium, Athens
Attendance: 10,000
Referee: Andreas Kouniaidis (Cyprus)

6 September 1967

FK Vardar (Socialist Federal Republic of Yugoslavia)	1–1	(Greece) AEK Athens
Mojsov 85'	Report	Papaioannou 18'

Gradski, Skopje
Attendance: 7,000
Referee: Ratko Čanak (Yugoslavia)

12 September 1967

Farul Constanța (Romania)	1–1	(Greece) AEK Athens
Ologu 87'	Report	Papaioannou 75'

Farul, Constanța
Attendance: 8,000
Referee: Vasile Dumitrescu (Romania)

== Finals ==
Team 1	Agg.	Team 2	1st leg	2nd leg	Play-off
AEK Athens (Greece)	3–5	(Turkey) Fenerbahçe	2–1	0–1	1–3

=== First leg ===
11 October 1967

AEK Athens (Greece)	2–1	(Turkey) Fenerbahçe
Papaioannou 14'; Sofianidis 42' (pen.)	Report	Soydan 16'

AEK Stadium, Athens
Attendance: 24,200
Referee: Luben Spasov (Bulgaria)

=== Second leg ===
26 October 1967

Fenerbahçe (Turkey)	1–0	(Greece) AEK Athens
Aktuna 45+1' (pen.)	Report

Şükrü Saracoğlu Stadium, Istanbul
Attendance: 42,181
Referee: Božidar Botić (Yugoslavia)

2–2 on aggregrate. The away goals rule was not applied, so a play-off game at a neutral venue was fixed.

=== Play-off ===
29 May 1968

Fenerbahçe (Turkey)	3–1	(Greece) AEK Athens
Altıparmak 2', 70'; Şen 33'	Report	Papaioannou 71'

Mithat Paşa Stadium, Istanbul
Attendance: 24,817
Referee: Teodor Bechirov (Bulgaria)

According to Metin Kurt's account of an article in the Hürriyet newspaper dated December 2, 1971, Fenerbahçe striker Ogün Altıparmak admitted that he had used doping before the final. One of his teammates offered him a substance referred to as Kuvvet Macunu before the match, which he said boosted his performance. During a medical examination in the United States, a doctor asked whether he had taken an "energy pill", warned him about its dangers, and advised him not to use it again.
