= Christos Metskas =

Romanian footballer of Greek descent (born 1935)

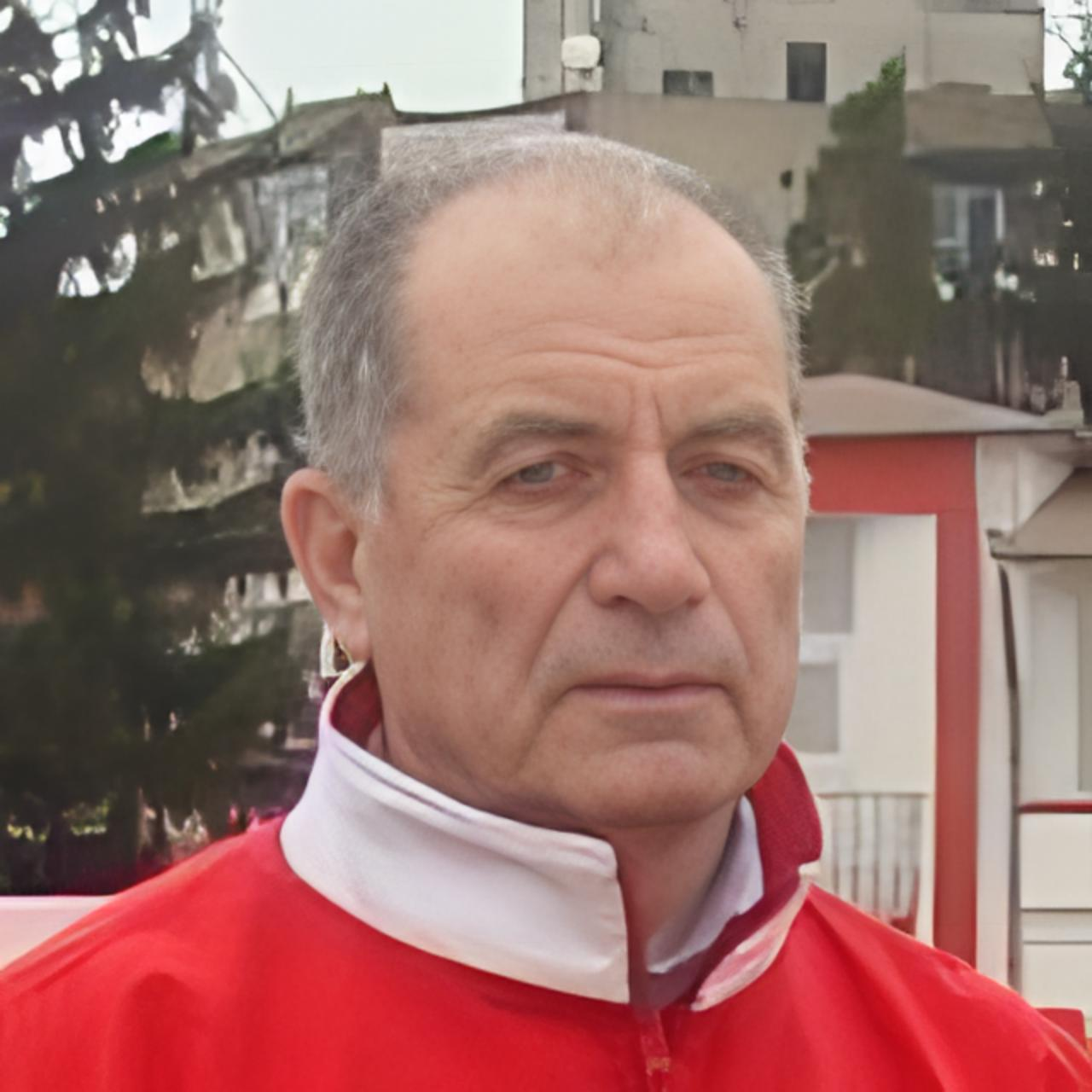
- Metskas in 2019

Personal information
- Date of birth: 17 June 1935 (age 91)
- Place of birth: Trilofos, Kastoria, Greece
- Positions: Forward; midfielder; sweeper

Youth career
- –1953: TAPL București

Senior career*
Years	Team	Apps	(Gls)
1953–1957	Flamura Roșie Giurgiu		
1957–1968	UTA Arad	217	(16)
1969–1972	Vulturii Textila Lugoj		

Managerial career
- 1969–1972: Vulturii Textila Lugoj (player-assistant)
- 1972–1974: Gloria Arad
- 1974–1975: Stăruința Dorobanți
- 1975–1976: Strungul Arad (assistant)
- 1975–1979: Strungul Arad (youth)
- 1980–1990: UTA Arad (youth)
- 199x: Progresul Pecica
- * Club domestic league appearances and goals

Christos Metskas (Greek: Χρήστος Μέτσκας, Romanian: Hristos Mețcas; born 17 June 1935) is a former footballer and football coach. Born in Greece, he acquired Greek citizenship in 2000, but remained stateless until he obtained Romanian citizenship in 2004.

== Early life ==
Metskas was born in Slimnitsa, Greece, the second of six children, to Stavros and Eleftheria. In the autumn of 1947, following the eruption of the Greek Civil War, he fled from Greece to Albania with his entire family; being then separated by his family – with his parents eventually settling in Hungary – and reached Romania by hiding on a cargo train that crossed the entire Yugoslavia, together with other Greek kids.

He initially settled in Orăștie, where he learned Romanian, before being sent to work in Ștefănești in 1949, and then moving to Bucharest, where he re-united with one of his brothers. In 1953, he graduated from the electro-technical vocational school in Craiova as a foundryman.

== Club career ==
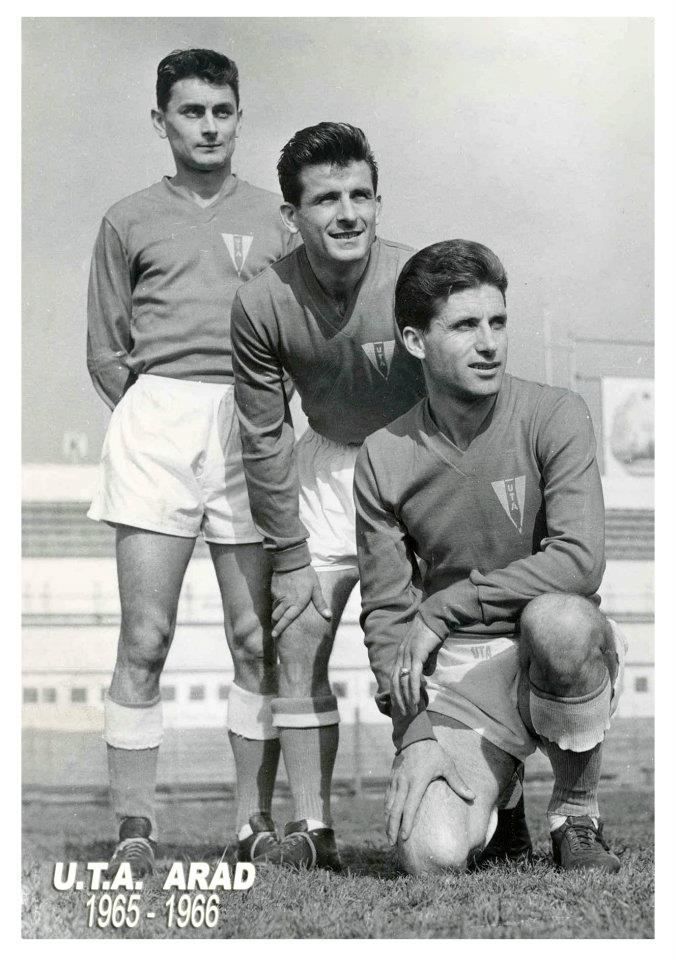
Metskas (on the right) with Mihai Țârlea and Emil Floruț at UTA Arad in 1965.

Metskas started playing football at school, before joining the youth team of TAPL București, and then moving to Giurgiu-based club Flamura Roșie, where he made his first-team debut in 1953. In 1957, after being noticed by a representative of UTA Arad during a match, he officially joined the club following a successful trial, during which he had reportedly impressed team leader József Pecsovszky.

Metskas went on to become a regular starter for UTA under manager Coloman Braun-Bogdan, who initially played him as a left winger in a WM formation; after shifting to the right side, Metskas would play as a forward for four years, before moving to the midfield and, finally, settling in the sweeper role. Throughout his years at the club, he played alongside players such as Pecsovszky, Ion Pârcălab, Gheorghe Băcuț, Flavius Domide, Zoltan Farmati, Toma Jurcă, Iosif Lereter and Gavril Serfözö, among others. Since, there were just a few people of Greek origin living in Arad, he was nicknamed "The Greek" by the supporters.

Metskas received and accepted an offer from Greek club Olympiacos: however, the deal fell through as a result of the coup d'état by the Greek junta, since the national borders of Greece were closed before he could obtain all the necessary paperwork to enter the country.

He reached with UTA the 1966 Cupa României final in which manager Nicolae Dumitrescu used him as a starter, however they lost with 4–0 in front of Steaua București. In 1968, following a fall-out with Dumitrescu, Metskas left the team. He played a total of 217 Divizia A matches for the club, scoring 16 goals in the process.

== Managerial career ==
Between 1969 and 1972, Metskas was both a player and an assistant coach for Vulturii Textila Lugoj's senior team, under head coach Mihai Țârlea sr., while also serving as the coach of the club's republican juniors' team.

Between 1972 and 1974, he served as the head coach of Gloria Arad; in the 1974–75 season, he coached Stăruința Dorobanți. From 1975 until 1979, he served as the coach of Strungul Arad's republican juniors' team; during the 1975–76 season, he also took over the role of assistant coach of the club's senior team, under head coach Emanoil Gherghel.

Between 1980 and 1990, he coached UTA Arad's republican juniors' team, with Ștefan Mândru, Francisc Tisza and Dorel Cura as assistants over time, with a one-year break, during which he worked as coach of the senior team of the club Progresul Pecica. Among his pupils, the following became well-known footballers who played in the first and second league: Raoul Burtea, Ștefan Crișan, Nicolae Dehelean, Lucian Dronca, Gheorghe Gheorghieș, Decebal Codru Grădinariu, Iulian Mihalache, Attila Pap, Dan Țapoș, Mihai Țârlea jr., Marius Țucudean, Adrian Ungur, Florian Voinea and Doru Vușcan.

== Personal life ==
In 1974, Metskas married Maria Ricean, a lawyer at the Arad bar, with whom he had a son. He acquired Greek citizenship in 2000, but maintained de facto the status of stateless person until 2004, when he also obtained Romanian citizenship.

== Honours ==
UTA Arad

- Cupa României runner-up: 1965–66

== Bibliography ==
- Costin, Ionel & Romanescu, Radu, Christos Metskas, Odyssey of a winner (Arad, Romania, Carmel&Print Design SRL, 2017)
- Mecheș, Ionel, Christos Metskas, A Gentleman from the Old Lady's Court, UTA (Arad, Romania, Azbest Publishing, 2020) ISBN 978-606-8737-69-0
- Stoica, Teodor, The Arad of Old Times (Arad, Romania, "Vasile Goldiș" Western University, 2023) ISBN 978-973-664-943-1
