= FC UTA Arad in European football =

- Club: UTA Arad
- First entry: 1966–67 Balkans Cup
- Latest entry: 1972–73 UEFA Cup

Fotbal Club UTA Arad is a Romanian professional football club based in Arad, Arad County.

== Total statistics ==
| Competition | S | P | W | D | L | GF | GA | GD |
|---|---|---|---|---|---|---|---|---|
| UEFA Champions League / European Cup | 2 | 6 | 0 | 2 | 4 | 3 | 17 | –14 |
| UEFA Europa League / UEFA Cup | 2 | 10 | 3 | 2 | 5 | 13 | 14 | –1 |
| Balkans Cup | 1 | 6 | 1 | 0 | 5 | 4 | 12 | –8 |
| Total | 5 | 22 | 4 | 4 | 14 | 20 | 43 | –23 |

== Statistics by country ==
| Country | Club | P | W | D | L | GF | GA | GD |
|---|---|---|---|---|---|---|---|---|
| Albania | Partizani Tirana | 2 | 0 | 0 | 2 | 1 | 4 | –3 |
| Subtotal | | 2 | 0 | 0 | 2 | 1 | 4 | –3 |
| Austria | Austria Salzburg | 2 | 1 | 0 | 1 | 5 | 4 | +1 |
| Subtotal | | 2 | 1 | 0 | 1 | 5 | 4 | +1 |
| Bulgaria | Cherno More Varna | 2 | 0 | 0 | 2 | 1 | 5 | –4 |
| Subtotal | | 2 | 0 | 0 | 2 | 1 | 5 | –4 |
| England | Tottenham Hotspur | 2 | 0 | 1 | 1 | 1 | 3 | –2 |
| Subtotal | | 2 | 0 | 1 | 1 | 1 | 3 | –2 |
| Netherlands | Feyenoord | 2 | 0 | 2 | 0 | 1 | 1 | 0 |
| Subtotal | | 2 | 0 | 2 | 0 | 1 | 1 | 0 |
| Poland | Legia Warsaw | 2 | 0 | 0 | 2 | 1 | 10 | –9 |
| Poland | Zagłębie Wałbrzych | 2 | 1 | 1 | 0 | 3 | 2 | +1 |
| Subtotal | | 4 | 1 | 1 | 2 | 4 | 12 | –8 |
| Portugal | Vitória Setúbal | 2 | 1 | 0 | 1 | 3 | 1 | +2 |
| Subtotal | | 2 | 1 | 0 | 1 | 3 | 1 | +2 |
| Serbia / (Socialist Federal Republic of Yugoslavia) Yugoslavia | Red Star Belgrade | 2 | 0 | 0 | 2 | 1 | 6 | –5 |
| Subtotal | | 2 | 0 | 0 | 2 | 1 | 6 | –5 |
| Sweden | IFK Norrköping | 2 | 0 | 0 | 2 | 1 | 4 | –3 |
| Subtotal | | 2 | 0 | 0 | 2 | 1 | 4 | –3 |
| Turkey | Fenerbahçe | 2 | 1 | 0 | 1 | 2 | 3 | –1 |
| Subtotal | | 2 | 1 | 0 | 1 | 2 | 3 | –1 |
| Total | | 22 | 4 | 4 | 14 | 20 | 43 | –23 |

== Statistics by competition ==
=== UEFA Champions League / European Cup ===
| Season | Round | Club | Home | Away | Aggregate |
|---|---|---|---|---|---|
| 1969–70 | First round | (Poland) Legia Warsaw | 1–2 | 0–8 | 1–10 |
| 1970–71 | First round | (Netherlands) Feyenoord | 0–0 | 1–1 | 1–1 (a) |
| 1970–71 | Second round | (Socialist Federal Republic of Yugoslavia) Red Star Belgrade | 1–3 | 0–3 | 1–6 |

=== UEFA Europa League / UEFA Cup ===
| Season | Round | Club | Home | Away | Aggregate |
|---|---|---|---|---|---|
| 1971–72 | First round | Austria Salzburg | 4–1 | 1–3 | 5–4 |
| 1971–72 | Second round | (Poland) Zagłębie Wałbrzych | 2–1 | 1–1 | 3–2 |
| 1971–72 | Third round | (Portugal) Vitória Setúbal | 3–0 | 0–1 | 3–1 |
| 1971–72 | Quarter-finals | (England) Tottenham Hotspur | 0–2 | 1–1 | 1–3 |
| 1972–73 | First round | (Sweden) IFK Norrköping | 1–2 | 0–2 | 1–4 |

=== Balkans Cup ===
| Season | Round | Club | Home | Away | Aggregate |
|---|---|---|---|---|---|
| 1966–67 | Group I | (Bulgaria) Cherno More Varna | 0–2 | 1–3 | 1–5 |
| 1966–67 | Group I | (Albania) Partizani Tirana | 1–2 | 0–2 | 1–4 |
| 1966–67 | Group I | (Turkey) Fenerbahçe | 1–0 | 1–3 | 2–3 |
