= Șchiopu =

Şchiopu is a Romanian surname. Notable people with the surname include:

- Cristian Șchiopu (born 1974), Romanian footballer
- Dumitru Șchiopu (born 1959), Romanian boxer
- Petru Șchiopu (1947–2014), Romanian football midfielder
- Ursula Șchiopu (1918–2015), Romanian psychologist, academic, and poet
