= Mihai Țârlea =

Mihai Țârlea may refer to:

- Mihai Țârlea (footballer, born 1938) (1938–1984), Romanian football forward
- Mihai Țârlea (footballer, born 1964), Romanian football forward and manager, son of above
