= Ion Ciosescu =

Romanian footballer (died 2014)

- Ciosescu in 1963

Personal information
- Date of birth: 18 April 1935
- Place of birth: Arad, Romania
- Date of death: 15 February 2014 (aged 78)
- Place of death: Arad, Romania
- Position: Forward

Youth career
- UTA Arad
- 1952–1954: Știința Timișoara

Senior career*
Years	Team	Apps	(Gls)
1952	UTA Arad	0	(0)
1954–1958	Știința Timișoara	99	(72)
1959–1963	Farul Constanța (Note: The statistics for the 1961–62 Divizia B season are unavailable.)	66	(26)
1963–1964	Știința Timișoara	12	(2)
Total		177	(100)

International career
1956–1957	Romania B	2	(0)
- * Club domestic league appearances and goals

Ion Ciosescu (18 April 1935 – 15 February 2014), also spelt Ioan Ciosescu, was a Romanian footballer who played as a forward.

== Club career ==
Ciosescu was born on 18 April 1935 in Arad, Romania. He began playing junior-level football at local club UTA under coach Petre Steinbach and in 1950, he played for the club's reserve team, before being promoted to the first team in 1952. That year, he moved to Timișoara to attend the Institute of Medicine and play for the reserve team of Știința. His Divizia A debut for the first team took place on 28 March 1954 under coach Eugen Mladin in Știința's 0–0 draw against Universitatea Cluj. Ciosescu scored his first goal in the competition on 11 April in a 1–1 draw against Jiul Petroșani. In the 1955 season, he netted 18 goals, which made him the top-scorer of the league, with one goal more than teammate Constantin Dinulescu. In the last round of that season, which took place on 30 November 1955, he scored six goals in an 8–0 win against Dinamo Brașov. He became the top-scorer of the league for a second time by scoring 21 goals in the 1957–58 season. During the same season, he helped Știința win the Cupa României, playing the entire match under coach Dincă Schileru in the 1–0 victory against Progresul București in the final. Over his years spent at Știința, Ciosescu played in several West derby fixtures against UTA Arad and scored nine goals—including a hat-trick in a 4–0 victory—contributing to a sequence of three wins and two draws for his side.

In the middle of the 1958–59 season, after graduating from the Timișoara Institute of Medicine, Ciosescu went to play for Farul Constanța. They suffered relegation at the end of the 1960–61 season, but Ciosescu stayed with the club, scoring 36 goals to help the team gain promotion back to the first league after one year. Subsequently, in the 1962–63 season, he was part of the team's prolific offensive trio alongside Dinulescu and Iosif Bükössy, as the team finished in fifth place. He ended his career after playing for Știința Timișoara during the 1963–64 season, but could not avoid the team's relegation to the second league. Ciosescu accumulated a total of 177 matches with 100 goals scored in Divizia A.

== International career ==
Between 1956 and 1957, Ciosescu played two matches for Romania B, helping secure a win over Norway and a draw against Poland. However, he never played for Romania's senior team and on 13 May 2020, Gazeta Sporturilor included him on a list of best Romanian players who never played for the senior national team.

== Style of play ==
Petre Comăniță, who coached Ciosescu as an assistant at Farul Constanța, described his style of play as follows: "He was a master of positioning, possessed an extraordinary ability to anticipate crosses, had a keen instinct for goal, and was an excellent finisher. Ioan played as the number 9—the center-forward—and scored plenty of goals throughout the league season. He worked exceptionally well with the wingers, Moroianu (on the right) and Vasilescu (on the left)—both of whom were talented, fast players. I spent a lot of time training them on crossing; in any given match, Farul would send 30 to 40 balls into the opposition's penalty area from the flanks. Ciosescu was incredibly effective with these deliveries, whether by heading the ball or redirecting it with the side of his foot. Back then, the area near the goal wasn't nearly as crowded, and Ioan thrived in that space—evading defenders and using deceptive movement to his advantage."

== Personal life and death ==
After retiring from football, Ciosescu returned to Arad to continue practicing gynaecology until ending his medical career at age 60. In 2008, he was given the title of honorary citizen of Timișoara.

Ciosescu died at his home in Arad on 15 February 2014, at the age of 78.

== Honours ==
Știința Timișoara

- Cupa României: 1957–58

Farul Constanța

- Divizia B: 1961–62

Individual

- Divizia A top-scorer: 1955, 1957–58
