= Birau =

Birau or Birău may refer to:

- Birau (boat), a small dugout canoe of the Sama-Bajau people
- Kampong Birau, a village in Tutong District, Brunei
- Gavrilă Birău (1945–2025), a Romanian football player and manager
- Vichentie Birău (1929–1992), a Romanian football player
