= Denis Țăroi =

Romanian footballer (born 2008)

Personal information
- Full name: Denis Alberto Ionuț Țăroi
- Date of birth: 6 April 2008 (age 18)
- Place of birth: Drobeta-Turnu Severin, Romania
- Height: 1.70 m (5 ft 7 in)
- Position: Attacking midfielder

Team information
- Current team: UTA Arad
- Number: 20

Youth career
- 2015–2018: Sport Kids Drobeta-Turnu Severin
- 2018–: UTA Arad

Senior career*
Years	Team	Apps	(Gls)
2025–	UTA Arad	31	(0)

International career^{‡}
2025	Romania U17	3	(2)
2025–2026	Romania U18	6	(0)
2026–	Romania U19	6	(0)
- * Club domestic league appearances and goals as of 6 November 2026 ‡ National team caps and goals as of 17 November 2026

Denis Alberto Ionuț Țăroi (born 6 April 2008) is a Romanian professional footballer who plays as an attacking midfielder for Liga I club UTA Arad.

== Career statistics ==
As of match played 6 November 2026

Appearances and goals by club, season and competition
Club	Season	League			Cupa României		Europe		Other		Total	
Club	Season	Division	Apps	Goals	Apps	Goals	Apps	Goals	Apps	Goals	Apps	Goals
UTA Arad	2024–25	Liga I	2	0	0	0	—		—		2	0
UTA Arad	2025–26	Liga I	16	0	2	0	—		—		18	0
UTA Arad	2026–27	Liga I	13	0	2	0	—		—		15	0
Career total			31	0	4	0	—		—		35	0
