= Adrian Dan Găman =

Romanian footballer

Personal information
- Full name: Adrian Dan Găman
- Date of birth: April 28, 1978 (age 48)
- Place of birth: Romania
- Position: Defender

Youth career
- FC UTA Arad

Senior career*
Years	Team	Apps	(Gls)
1995–2001	FC UTA Arad	107	(2)
1996–1997	FC Rapid București (loan)	?	(0)
2001–2002	Maccabi Kiryat Gat	30	(0)
2002–2003	Maccabi Netanya	27	(0)
2003–2006	Bnei Yehuda	57	(0)
2006–2007	Hakoah Amidar Ramat Gan	23	(0)
2008	BFC Siófok	3	(0)
2010	Lupo Martini Wolfsburg	12	(4)
- * Club domestic league appearances and goals

Adrian Dan Găman is a Romanian footballer.
