= Francisc von Neuman Stadium =

Romanian soccer stadium

- UTA
- Interactive map of Francisc von Neuman Stadium
- Location: Arad, Romania
- Coordinates: 46°11′33″N 21°18′43″E
- Owner: City of Arad
- Operator: UTA Arad
- Capacity: 11,500
- Surface: Grass

Construction
- Opened: August 28, 2020
- Cost: €14 million
- Architect: Drast Company
- General contractor: City of Arad

Tenant
- UTA Arad (2020–present)

Francisc von Neuman Stadium is a football stadium in Arad, Romania. It is built on the site of the former Francisc von Neuman Stadium. The stadium was opened on 28 August 2020 and currently serves as the home for UTA Arad of the Liga I.

The stadium shares designing elements from Kirklees Stadium in Huddersfield which is visible in the stands. It is named after a local Jewish Hungarian aristocrat, Francisc von Neumann, a baron who owned several businesses in Arad and personally sponsored the construction of the old stadium and the founding of the team.

The first match at the stadium was a Liga I game played between UTA Arad and Voluntari, which ended in a goalless draw. Due to the COVID-19 pandemic, the game was played without spectators.

The first match with spectators was the 2021 women's Romanian Cup final between U Olimpia Cluj and Heniu Prundu Bârgăului, which ended with a 1–0 win in extra-time for the Cluj team.

The first international game played on the arena was the friendly goalless draw between UTA Arad and Kolubara Lazarevac.

== See also ==
- List of football stadiums in Romania
