= Ladislau Brosovszky =

Romanian footballer

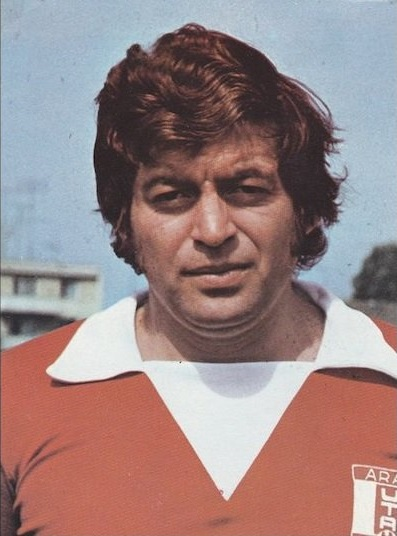

Personal information
- Date of birth: 23 March 1951
- Place of birth: Arad, Romania
- Date of death: 23 December 1990 (aged 39)
- Place of death: Arad, Romania
- Height: 1.75 m (5 ft 9 in)
- Positions: Left winger; attacking midfielder

Senior career*
Years	Team	Apps	(Gls)
1967–1968	Vagonul Arad	1	(0)
1968–1979	UTA Arad	314	(100)
1980–1982	Rapid Arad	37	(13)
Total		352	(113)

International career
1969–1971	Romania U23	13	(2)
1972	Romania Olympic	2	(1)
1972–1974	Romania	3	(1)
- * Club domestic league appearances and goals

Ladislau "Gioni" Brosovszky (Romanian: Broșovschi) (23 March 1951 – 23 December 1990) was a Romanian football midfielder with Hungarian roots.

== Club career ==
Brosovszky was born on 23 March 1951 in Arad, Romania and began playing football in the 1967–68 Divizia B season at local club Vagonul. In the following season he joined UTA Arad with whom he made his Divizia A debut on 1 September 1968 in a 1–0 away loss to Petrolul Ploiești. In his first season, he was used by coach Nicolae Dumitrescu in a total of 21 matches in which he scored one goal as the team won the title. He won another title in the next season, contributing with one goal scored in the 30 appearances Dumitrescu gave him. He took part in UTA's 1970–71 European Cup campaign in which they eliminated the defending European champions Feyenoord, being defeated by Red Star Belgrade in the following round against whom he scored a goal. Brosovszky also played eight matches in the 1971–72 UEFA Cup campaign, scoring one goal against each of Austria Salzburg and Zagłębie Wałbrzych, helping UTA reach the quarter-finals where they were eliminated with 3–1 on aggregate by Tottenham Hotspur who eventually won the competition. In the beginning of his career, he played as a left defender, but afterwards he played more as an offensive midfielder, a position from which he scored a personal record of 16 goals in the 1976–77 season. Brosovszky made his last Divizia A appearance on 24 June 1979 in a 6–2 home victory against Politehnica Iași, finishing as UTA's top-scorer in the competition with 100 goals in 314 appearances, alongside four goals in 16 European matches. Among these goals, eight were scored in the West derby against Politehnica Timișoara, contributing to six victories and one draw for his side. He spent the last two years of his career in Divizia B at Rapid Arad.

== International career ==
Between 1969 and 1972, Brosovszky made several appearances for Romania's under-23 and Olympic sides.

Brosovszky played three friendly games for Romania, making his debut under coach Gheorghe Ola on 30 January 1972 in a 4–2 away victory against Morocco in which he scored a goal. His following two appearances were in a 2–2 draw against Peru and a 2–1 loss to Argentina.

=== International goals ===
Scores and results list Romania's goal tally first. "Score" column indicates the score after the player's goal.

#	Date	Venue	Opponent	Score	Result	Competition
1.	30 January 1972	Stade Mohamed V, Casablanca, Morocco	Morocco	3–1	4–2	Friendly

== Personal life and death ==
Brosovszky's father, Antoniu, was also a footballer who played for UTA Arad. His daughter, Monica Brosovszky-Boriga, was a basketball player who played 270 games for the Romania women's national basketball team and won the Liga Națională six times with BC ICIM Arad and CSM Târgoviște. Brosovszky died on 23 December 1990 at age 39 after suffering a heart attack.

A book about Brosovszky was written by Radu Romănescu and Ionel Costin, titled Gioni Brosovszky – ultimul mare romantic (Gioni Brosovszky – the last great romantic), which was released on 18 April 2022 with the occasion of 77 years since the foundation of UTA Arad.

== Honours ==
UTA Arad

- Divizia A: 1968–69, 1969–70
