= Cristian Todea =

Romanian footballer and manager

Personal information
- Date of birth: 18 October 1978 (age 48)
- Place of birth: Arad, Romania
- Height: 1.85 m (6 ft 1 in)
- Position: Midfielder

Team information
- Current team: Gloria Bistrița (assistant)

Youth career
- –1997: UTA Arad

Senior career*
Years	Team	Apps	(Gls)
1997–2002	UTA Arad	128	(13)
2002–2005	Mantova	67	(3)
2005–2006	Bellinzona	40	(5)
2007–2008	UTA Arad	54	(3)
2009–2015	Gaz Metan Mediaş	168	(7)
Total		457	(31)

Managerial career
- 2015–2017: UTA Arad (assistant)
- 2017–2018: UTA Arad
- 2018: Victoria Zăbrani
- 2019: Național Sebiș
- 2019–2021: Dunărea Călărași (assistant)
- 2023–2024: Șoimii Lipova
- 2024–: Gloria Bistrița (assistant)
- * Club domestic league appearances and goals as of 12:53, 8 November 2024 (UTC)

Cristian Todea (born 18 October 1978) is a Romanian former pfofessional footballer who played as a midfielder.

== Honours ==
UTA Arad

- Liga II: 2001–02

Mantova

- Serie C2: 2003–04
