= Știința Stadium =

Romanian stadium

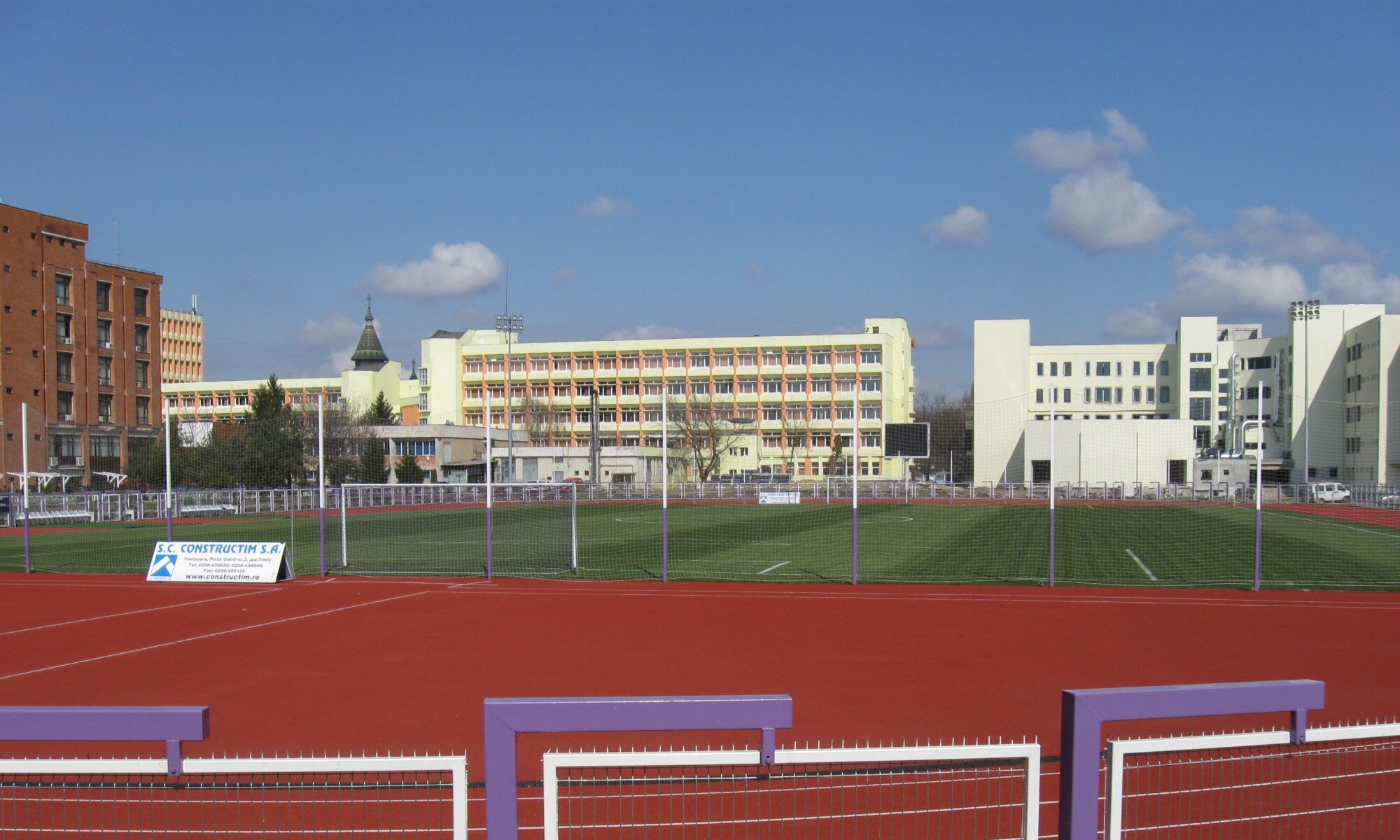
- Interactive map of Știința Stadium
- Former names: Politehnica Stadium
- Location: Timișoara, Romania
- Coordinates: 45°44′45″N 21°13′42″E
- Owner: Polytechnic University of Timișoara
- Capacity: 2,600
- Surface: Grass
- Scoreboard: Yes
- Record attendance: 24,000 (Știința Timișoara–Dinamo Prague, 1958)
- Field size: 105 × 68 m
- Public transit: Bus lines E3, E7, E8, 16b Tram lines 6, 8

Construction
- Opened: 28 June 1928
- Renovated: 2012

Tenants
- FC Politehnica Timișoara (1928–1963); SSU Politehnica Timișoara (2012–present)

Știința Stadium (Romanian: Stadionul Știința) is a football stadium in Timișoara. Opened in 1928, the stadium is located on the campus of the Polytechnic University of Timișoara. The stadium has an athletics track, an electronic scoreboard, floodlights, as well as facilities for athletes (locker rooms, showers, gym, etc.). Politehnica Timișoara, the city's flagship team, played on this stadium until the construction of Dan Păltinișanu Stadium. It is now used by Liga II team SSU Politehnica Timișoara.

In 2020, the National Investment Company approved an extensive expansion and modernization project that provides for increasing the capacity of the grandstands to 3,000 seats, rooftop minifootball fields, various sports spaces and functions, as well as an above-ground parking lot.
