= Adrian Lucaci =

Romanian footballer (1966–2020)

Personal information
- Date of birth: 28 June 1966
- Place of birth: Arad, Romania
- Date of death: 12 April 2020 (aged 53)
- Place of death: Arad, Romania
- Position: Central defender

Senior career*
Years	Team	Apps	(Gls)
1983–1984	Rapid Arad	17	(0)
1984–1987	UTA Arad	65	(9)
1987–1988	Steaua Bucureşti	2	(0)
1988–1993	Sportul Studențesc București	143	(7)
1993–1994	Universitatea Cluj	26	(4)
1994–1996	UTA Arad	54	(5)
1997	Telecom Arad	8	(0)
Total		315	(25)

International career
1989	Romania U21	3	(0)
1993	Romania B	6	(0)

Managerial career
- Telecom Arad
- Păulișana Păuliș
- Progresul Pecica
- Șoimii Lipova
- Universitatea Arad
- * Club domestic league appearances and goals

Adrian Lucaci (28 June 1966 – 12 April 2020) was a Romanian footballer who played as a central defender. After he ended his playing career, he worked for a while as a manager at teams from the Arad County and president at clubs from the Romanian lower leagues. In 2019, Lucaci was rewarded by the local administration with the title of "excellence in sports" for outstanding sports activity and contribution to the development of football in the Arad County. Since 2014 until his death in 2020 he was president of the Arad County Football Association (AJF Arad).

== Honours ==
Steaua Bucureşti

- Divizia A: 1987–88
