= Stadionul Francisc von Neuman (1946) =

Former multi-purpose stadium in Arad, Romania

Francisc von Neuman
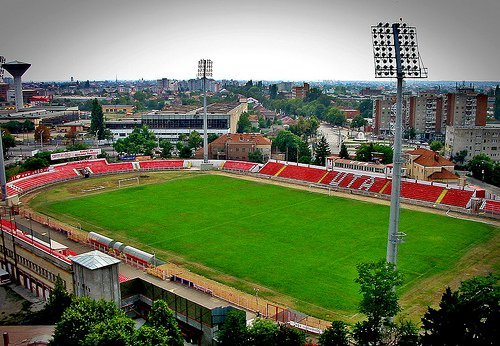
- Interactive map of Francisc von Neuman
- Location: Arad, Romania
- Coordinates: 46°11′33″N 21°18′41″E
- Owner: The Arad local council
- Operator: UTA Arad
- Capacity: 7,287 (Football)
- Surface: Grass

Construction
- Built: 1940 - 1945
- Opened: 1946
- Demolished: 2014

Tenant
- UTA Arad (1946–2014)

Francisc von Neuman Stadium was a multi-purpose stadium in Arad, Romania. It was used mostly for football matches and was the home ground of FC UTA Arad, one of the most successful teams in Romanian club football. The stadium used to hold up to 7,287 people, all on seats, and was built in 1944.

In 2014, the stadium was demolished to make way for a new, modern, all-seater stadium. It is to be used exclusively for football, and it was open in 2020. The new stadium will have a capacity of 12.700 seats, and will also include offices, a press club, a press center, V.I.P. hospitality, a restaurant and a hotel.

== History ==
The stadium was opened on 1 September 1946 with a match between UTA Arad - Ciocanul București 1–0. At that time, the stadium was considered the most modern in the country. It is named after a local Jewish aristocrat, Francisc von Neumann, a baron who owned several businesses in Arad and who personally sponsored the construction of the stadium and the founding of the team. While studying in England, he became a fan of the London-based football team Arsenal, hence the similar team colours.

In 2006, the stadium went through a major overhaul, when the municipality invested over 700.000 euro for new seats (dropping its capacity from approximately 10.000 on benches), main stand structural repairs, new cloakrooms, an anti-doping control room, an emergency medical room, a VIP sector, new multimedia sector and a new sound system.

In 2008, a 1400 lux density floodlight system was installed as well as a new electronic scoreboard.

In 2010, the municipality presented plans for a new 12.700 capacity all-seater stadium to be built on the exact site of this arena.

== Events ==
=== Association football ===
International football matches
Date	Competition	Home	Away	Score	Attendance
28 March 2009	2009 UEFA Euro Under-21 qualification	Romania	Andorra	2–0	7,200

=== Association football ===
International football clubs matches
Date	Competition	Home	Away	Score	Attendance
13 August 1967	Balkans Cup	(Romania) UTA Arad	(Turkey) Fenerbahçe	1–0	
18 September 1969	European Cup	(Romania) UTA Arad	(Poland) Legia Warsaw	1–2	12,781
30 September 1970	European Cup	(Romania) UTA Arad	(Netherlands) Feyenoord	0–0	17,000
4 November 1970	European Cup	(Romania) UTA Arad	(Socialist Federal Republic of Yugoslavia) Red Star Belgrade	1–3	18,000
15 September 1971	UEFA Cup	(Romania) UTA Arad	Austria Salzburg	4–1	15,000
3 November 1971	UEFA Cup	(Romania) UTA Arad	(Poland) Zagłębie Wałbrzych	2–1	8,000
24 November 1971	UEFA Cup	(Romania) UTA Arad	(Portugal) Vitória Setúbal	3–0	7,000
7 March 1972	UEFA Cup	(Romania) UTA Arad	(England) Tottenham Hotspur	0–2	12,253
13 September 1972	UEFA Cup	(Romania) UTA Arad	(Sweden) Norrköping	1–2	10,000

== Gallery ==
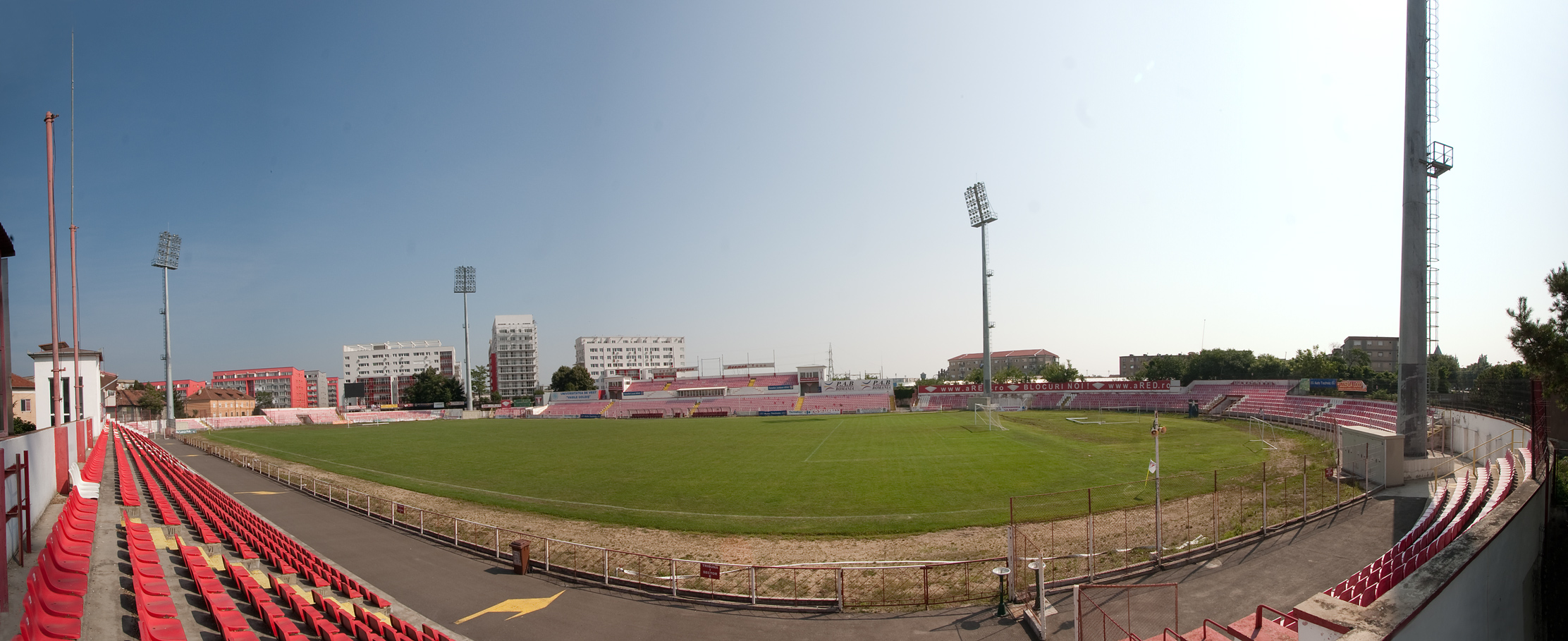
Stadium panorama.

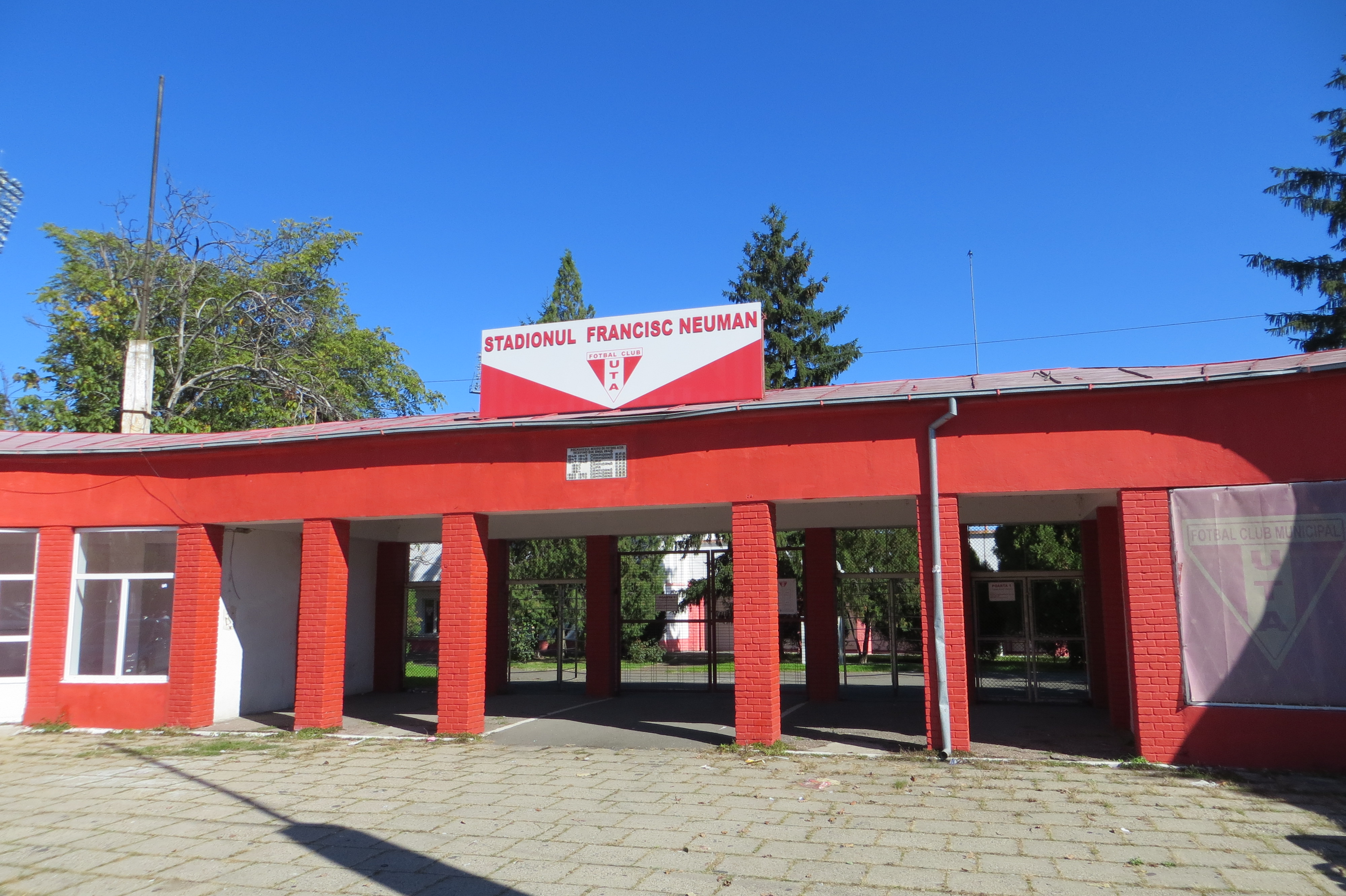
Stadium entry.
