= Ursula Șchiopu =

- Born: July 30, 1918; Cluj, Romania
- Died: March 4, 2015 (aged 96); Bucharest, Romania
- Education: University of Bucharest
- Known for: Psychology of peace
- Scientific career
- Fields: Psychology
- Workplaces: University of Bucharest

Ursula Mariana Șchiopu (July 30, 1918 – March 4, 2015) was a Romanian psychologist, academic, and poet. She contributed to the development of the psychology of peace, war, and terrorism.

== Selected works ==
Psychological

- Psihologia copilului, vol. I și II, Editura Didactică și Pedagogică;
- Psihologia copilului, E.D.P., 1963;
- Psihologia copilului, E.D.P., 1976, ediția a II-a;
- Introducere în psihodiagnostic, T.U.B.;
- Orientare școlară și profesională, T.U.B., 1971;
- Psihologia vârstelor, E.D.P., (with Emil Verza);
- Dezvoltarea operativității gândirii, Editura Științifică, 1966, preface by acad. Gh. Mihoc;
- Criza de originalitate la adolescenți, E.D.P., 1970;
- Probleme psihologice ale jocului și distracțiilor, E.D.P., 1970;
- Dicționar enciclopedic de psihologie, T.U.B., 1969;
- Adolescență, personalitate, limbaj, Ed. Albatros, 1989, with Emil Verza;
- Psihologia vârstelor, E.D.P., 1997, with Emil Verza;
- Psihologia generală a copilului, E.D.P., 1982 ediția I și 1985 – ediția a II-a, with V. Pisloi;
- Dicționar enciclopedic de psihologie, editor, București, Ed. Babel, 1997;
- Psihologia artelor, E.D.P., 1999;
- Psihologia diferențială (2 vol.), România Press, 2006;
- Istoria psihologiei, Ed Academiei Române, 2007;
- Psihologia moderna, Ed. Diana Press SRL, 2008.

Poetry

- Drum prin zodii, 1939;
- Cer troglodit,1943;
- Poeme, 1967;
- Reîntoarcerile, 1973;
- Peisaj interior, 1970;
- Pendul cosmic,1984;
- Mărturisiri de noapte,1980;
- La marginea timpului care își caută umbra, 2004;
- Antologia poeziei canadiene franceze,1976, com Al. Andrițoiu.
