= Ciprian Rus =

Romanian footballer

Personal information
- Date of birth: 1 March 1991 (age 35)
- Place of birth: Arad, Romania
- Height: 1.78 m (5 ft 10 in)
- Position: Forward

Youth career
- –2009: Atletico Arad

Senior career*
Years	Team	Apps	(Gls)
2010	Voința Mailat		
2010–2012	CS Vladimirescu		
2012–2013	Șoimii Pâncota		
2013	CS Vladimirescu		
2013	Atletico Békéscsaba	14	(21)
2013–2016	UTA Arad	77	(28)
2016–2017	ASA Târgu Mureș	22	(1)
2017	Pandurii Târgu Jiu	20	(6)
2018	Dunărea Călărași	13	(1)
2018–2021	UTA Arad	89	(32)
2021–2022	Viitorul Târgu Jiu	22	(6)
2022–2023	Unirea Slobozia	25	(6)
2023–2024	CSM Reșița	21	(3)
Total		303	(104)
- * Club domestic league appearances and goals as of 3 May 2024

Ciprian Rus (born 1 March 1991) is a Romanian professional footballer who plays as a forward.

== Honours ==
Dunărea Călărași

- Liga II: 2017–18

UTA Arad

- Liga II: 2019–20
- Liga III: 2014–15
- Liga IV – Arad County: 2013–14
