= Adrian Ungur (footballer) =

Romanian footballer

Personal information
- Date of birth: 13 December 1971 (age 54)
- Place of birth: Arad, Romania
- Position: Forward

Senior career*
Years	Team	Apps	(Gls)
1991–1994	UTA Arad (Note: The statistics for the 1991–92 and 1992–93 Divizia B seasons are unavailable.)	31	(15)
1994–1998	Universitatea Craiova	104	(32)
1998–1999	Hapoel Kfar Saba	27	(11)
1999–2000	Hapoel Petah Tikva	3	(2)
Total		165	(60)

International career
1991	Romania U21	1	(0)
1994	Romania	1	(0)
- * Club domestic league appearances and goals

Adrian Ungur (born 13 December 1971) is a retired Romanian footballer who played as a striker. He scored 47 goals in 135 Divizia A matches, and was capped once for Romania.

== Club career ==
=== UTA Arad ===
Ungur was born on 13 December 1971 in Arad, Romania and grew up admiring footballers Flavius Domide and Ilie Balaci. He began playing senior-level football at UTA Arad during the 1991–92 Divizia B season. In the following season, he helped the team gain promotion to the first league. Subsequently, Ungur made his Divizia A debut on 15 August 1993 under coach Nicolae Dumitrescu in a 2–1 loss to Petrolul Ploiești. On 13 September, he scored a goal in a 1–0 West derby win over Politehnica Timișoara. Later, in November, he provided the game-winning goal in a 1–0 home victory against Steaua București. He netted 15 goals until the end of the season, which helped UTA avoid relegation.

=== Universitatea Craiova ===
In 1994, Ungur joined Universitatea Craiova, where he began playing in European competitions, appearing in both legs of the 4–1 aggregate loss to Dinamo Tbilisi in the 1994–95 UEFA Cup preliminary round. Domestically, he scored 10 goals during his first season to help the team finish runner-up in the league. He then played in both legs of the 1995–96 UEFA Cup preliminary round, as "U" Craiova suffered defeat to Dinamo Minsk. Afterwards, Ungur played three games in the 1996 Intertoto Cup, netting a brace in a 3–0 win over Daugava and one goal in a 2–1 success over Čukarički Stankom. Universitatea reached the 1998 Cupa României final, but coach José Ramón Alexanko did not use him in the 1–0 loss to Rapid București. During his years spent with "U", Ungur also captained the team for a while. He amassed a total of 135 Divizia A matches with 47 goals.

=== Hapoel Kfar Saba and Hapoel Petah Tikva ===
In 1998, Ungur moved to the Israeli first-tier club Hapoel Kfar Saba, scoring 11 goals in his first season. For the 1999–2000 season, he played for Hapoel Petah Tikva, retiring afterwards.

== International career ==
In 1991, Ungur played one match for Romania's under-21 national team in a 1–1 draw against Israel.

Ungur played one friendly game for Romania on 16 February 1994, when coach Anghel Iordănescu sent him on at halftime to replace Radu Niculescu in a 2–1 victory at the Changwon Civil Stadium against South Korea.

== Honours ==
UTA Arad

- Divizia B: 1992–93

Universitatea Craiova

- Divizia A runner-up: 1994–95
- Cupa României runner-up: 1997–98
