= Jérémie N'Jock =

Cameroonian footballer

Personal information
- Date of birth: 12 March 1980 (age 46)
- Place of birth: Bafoussam, Cameroon
- Height: 1.96 m (6 ft 5 in)
- Position: Forward

Youth career
- Sosucam Mbandjock
- Sugar Yaoundé

Senior career*
Years	Team	Apps	(Gls)
1998–1999	Stade Nyonnais		
1999–2000	Al-Arabi		
2000–2001	WAC		
2001–2002	Stuttgarter Kickers	8	(2)
2002–2003	UTA Arad	23	(9)
2003–2004	FCU Craiova	33	(15)
2005–2006	Mons	45	(21)
2006	Brest	18	(1)
2007–2009	FCU Craiova	12	(4)
2007–2008	→ Tubize (loan)	26	(8)
2009	Stahl Riesa	3	(0)
2009–2010	Tubize	14	(2)
2010	Estoril	10	(1)
2010–2011	Arouca	25	(12)
2011–2012	Moreirense	6	(1)
2012	FC Huy	14	(1)
2013	Al-Mesaimeer		
- * Club domestic league appearances and goals

Jérémie N'Jock (born 12 March 1980) is a Cameroonian former professional footballer who played as a forward.

== Career ==
N'Jock as born in Bafoussam, Cameroon. Moving abroad at the age of 18, he rarely settled in a club or country. His first team was FC Stade Nyonnais in Switzerland, followed by moves to Qatari (Al-Arabi Sports Club) and Moroccan (WAC Casablanca).

In 2001, N'Jock signed with Stuttgarter Kickers in the German lower leagues, moving to FC UTA Arad from Romania the following year. He scored 11 goals in 25 games in the 2003–04 season, helping another side in the country, FC Universitatea Craiova, to the fourth position in Liga I.

N'Jock joined Belgian First Division club R.A.E.C. Mons in January 2005, and netted a career-best 18 goals in his only full season, adding two in the domestic cup as the Hainaut team returned to the top level as champions.

Ligue 2 side Stade Brestois 29 noticed N'Jock's performances, and signed him for the following campaign. In the next transfer window, however, he left France and re-joined Universitatea Craiova, being loaned to Belgium's A.F.C. Tubize shortly after.

In the following years, N'Jock played for teams in familiar countries, Germany and Belgium, again representing Tubize in the latter. Already in his 30s, he switched to Portugal, playing with G.D. Estoril Praia, F.C. Arouca and Moreirense F.C. in the second division.

== Honours ==
Mons

- Belgian Second Division: 2005–06
