= Mihai Țârlea (footballer, born 1938) =

Romanian footballer

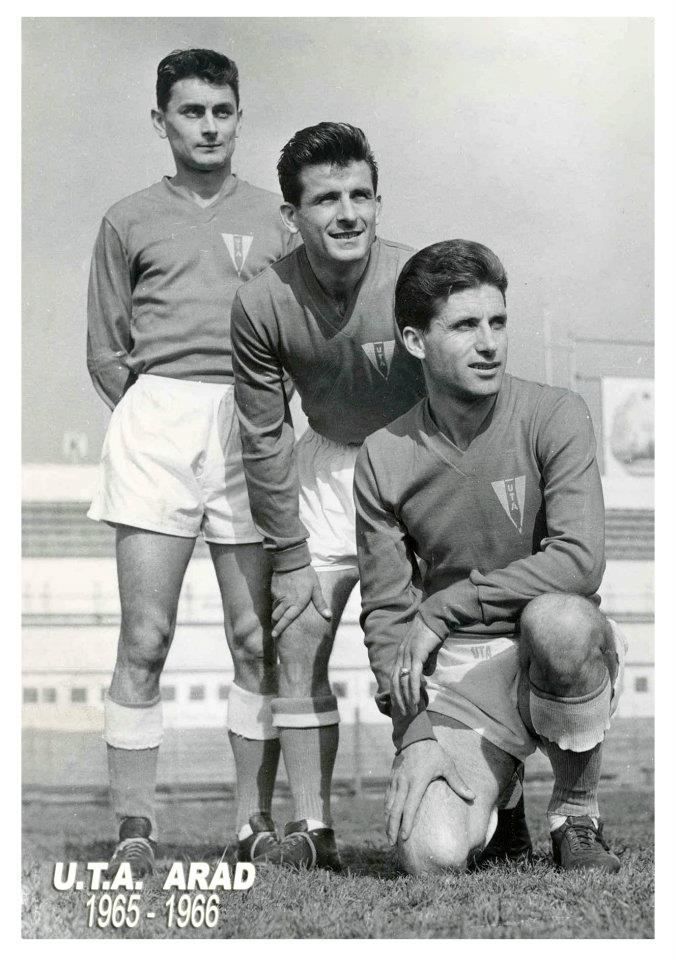
- Țârlea standing in UTA jersey for the 1965–66 season

Personal information
- Date of birth: 19 April 1938
- Place of birth: Livada de Bihor, Romania
- Date of death: 28 February 1984 (aged 45)
- Height: 1.73 m (5 ft 8 in)
- Position: Forward

Youth career
- Indagrara Arad

Senior career*
Years	Team	Apps	(Gls)
1957–1968	UTA Arad (Note: The 1957 championship called Cupa Primăverii is unofficial, so the appearances and goals scored at that competition for UTA Arad are not official.)	206	(80)

International career
1964	Romania Olympic	1	(2)

Managerial career
- 1969–1972: Vulturii Textila Lugoj
- * Club domestic league appearances and goals

Mihai Țârlea (19 April 1938 – 28 February 1984) was a Romanian football forward and manager.

== Club career ==
Țârlea was born on 19 April 1938 in Livada de Bihor, Romania. He began playing football at Indagrara Arad. Subsequently, he joined UTA Arad, making his Divizia A debut on 18 August 1957 under coach Eugen Mladin in a 1–0 away victory against Dinamo București.

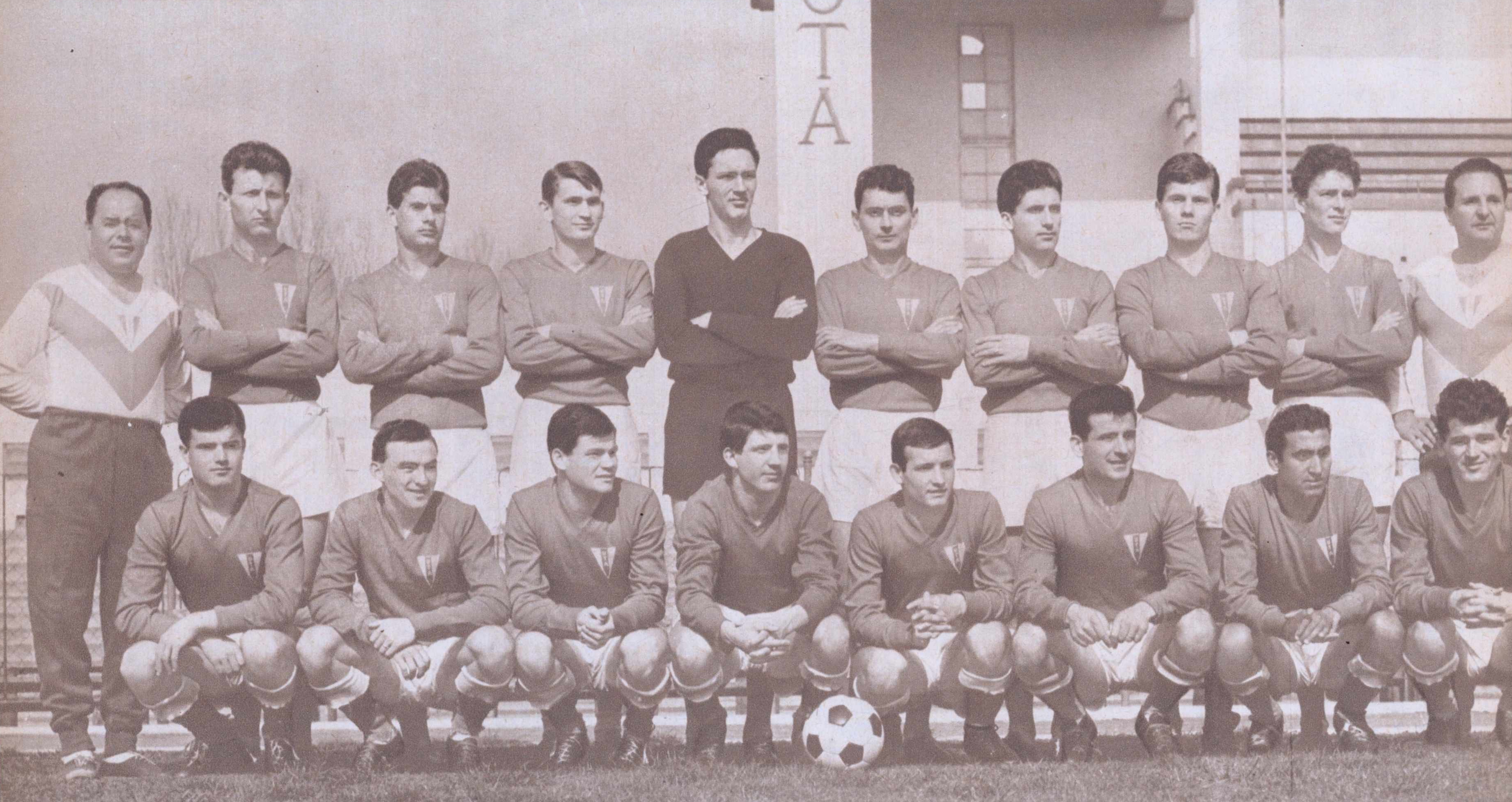
Țârlea (fifth from the right, back row) with UTA in 1966

Țârlea remained at UTA for the rest of his career, consisting of 11 seasons, a personal highlight being a third place as the top-scorer of the 1963–64 season with 16 goals alongside Steaua București's Florea Voinea. They also reached the 1966 Cupa României final, where coach Nicolae Dumitrescu used him the entire match in the 4–0 loss to Steaua. Subsequently, the team earned a fourth place in the 1967–68 season. Țârlea's last Divizia A appearance occurred on 26 May 1968 in a 2–0 away loss to Universitatea Craiova, totaling 206 games with 80 goals in the competition. Among these goals, six were scored in the West derby against Politehnica Timișoara, contributing to two victories, two draws, and one loss for his side.

== International career ==
Țârlea played one game and scored two goals for Romania's Olympic team in a 4–1 friendly victory against Czechoslovakia.

== Managerial career ==
Țârlea worked as a coach, leading alongside his assistant, Christos Metskas, Vulturii Textila Lugoj from 1969 to 1972, helping it earn promotion from Divizia C to Divizia B in the 1970–71 season.

== Personal life ==
His son, who is also named Mihai Țârlea, was also a footballer who played for UTA.

== Death ==
Țârlea died on 28 February 1984 at the age of 45.

== Honours ==
=== Player ===
UTA Arad

- Cupa României runner-up: 1965–66

=== Manager ===
Vulturii Textila Lugoj

- Divizia C: 1970–71

== See also ==
- List of one-club men in association football
