= Iosif Lereter =

Romanian footballer (1933–2024)

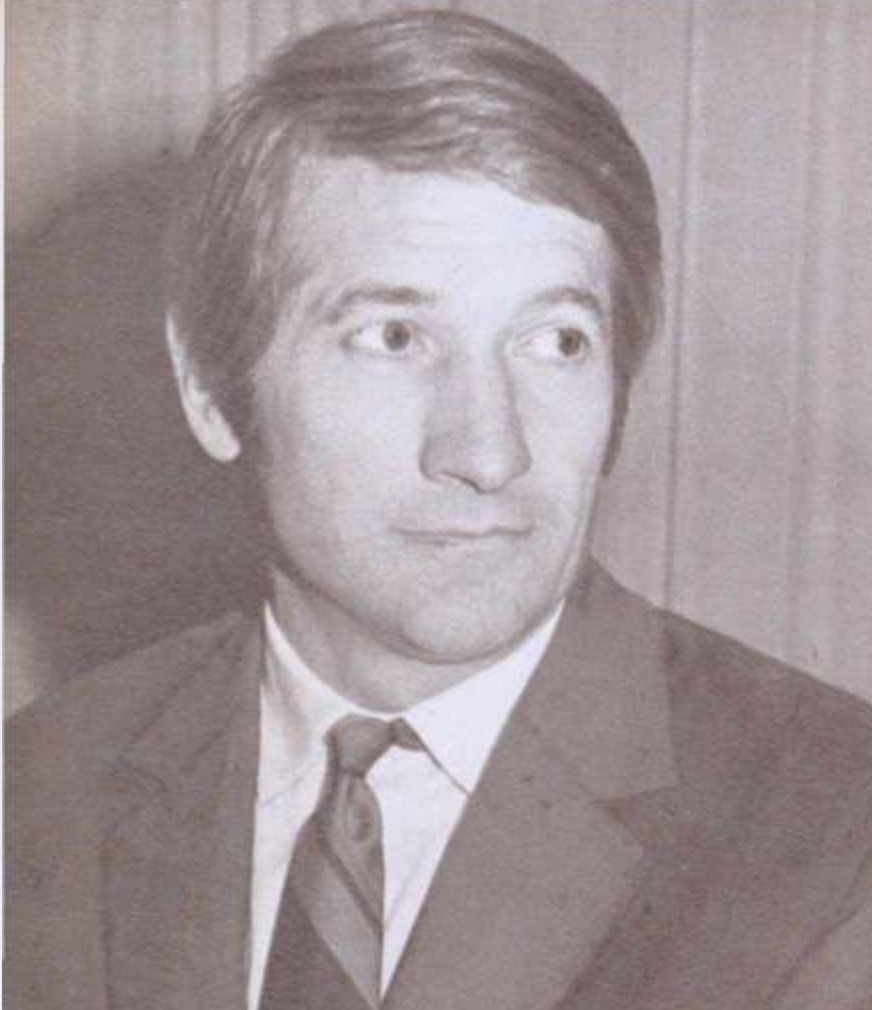
- Lereter in 1972

Personal information
- Date of birth: 23 July 1933
- Place of birth: Oțelu Roșu, Romania
- Date of death: 26 January 2024 (aged 90)
- Place of death: Timișoara, Romania
- Height: 1.81 m (5 ft 11 in)
- Positions: Forward; midfielder; centre-back

Senior career*
Years	Team	Apps	(Gls)
1949–1956	Energia Oțelu Roșu		
1957–1967	Politehnica Timișoara (Note: The 1957 championship called Cupa Primăverii is unofficial, so the appearances and goals scored at that competition for Politehnica Timișoara are not official.)	227	(89)
1967–1972	UTA Arad	148	(23)
Total		375	(112)

International career
1965	Romania	1	(0)

Managerial career
- 1972–1975: Constructorul Timișoara
- 1975–1977: UM Timișoara
- * Club domestic league appearances and goals

Iosif Lereter (23 July 1933 – 26 January 2024) was a Romanian footballer and manager.

== Club career ==
=== Energia Oțelu Roșu ===
Lereter was born on 23 July 1933 in Oțelu Roșu, Romania. In 1949, he started to play football in the lower leagues of Romania at the local club from his town Energia Oțelu Roșu. At the beginning of his career he played as a forward and midfielder, ending his career as a centre-back.

=== Politehnica Timișoara ===
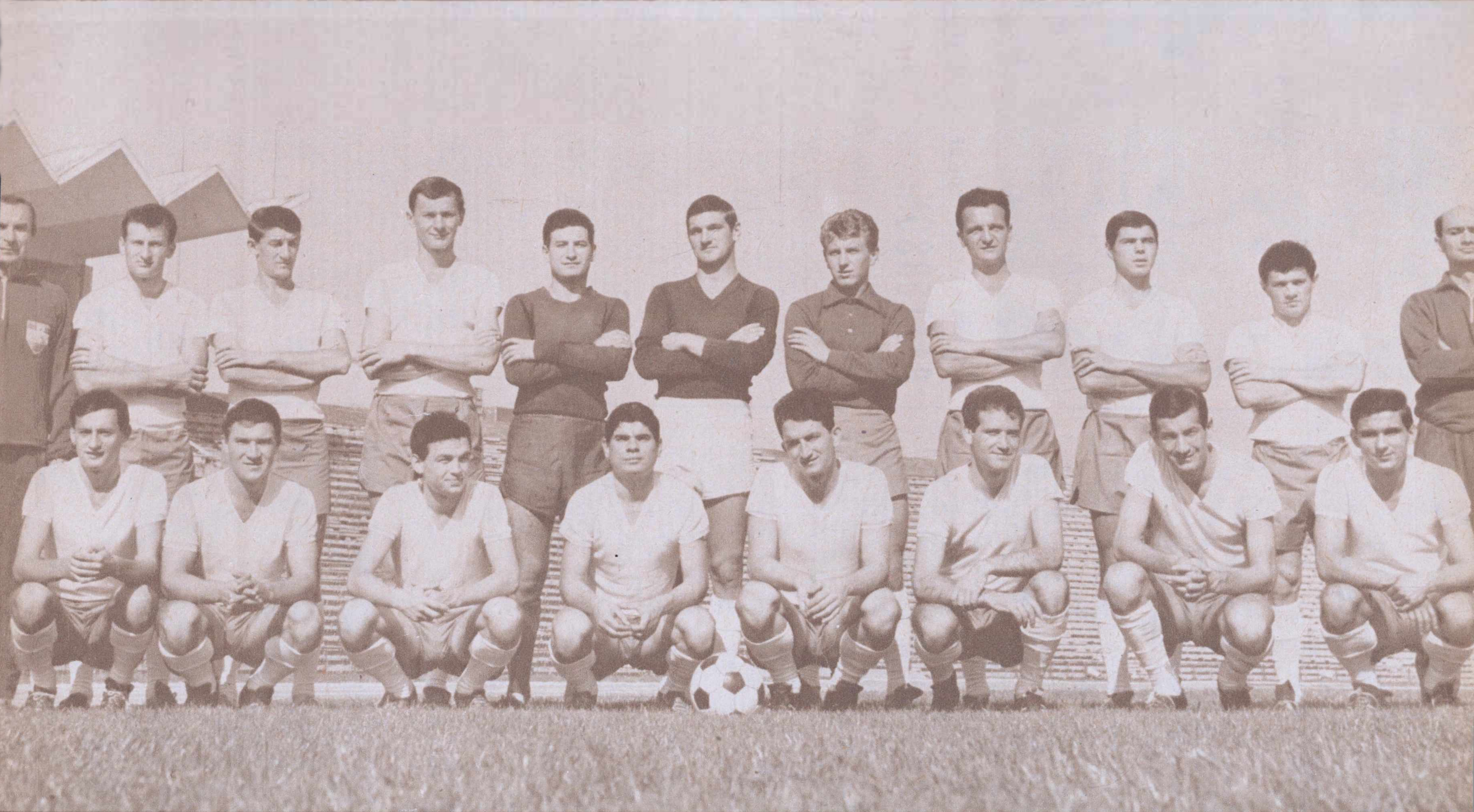
Lereter (front row, second from the right) with Știința Timișoara in 1965

Lereter moved to Politehnica Timișoara where he made his Divizia A debut on 18 August 1957 in a 2–2 draw against Progresul Oradea. He was part of Politehnica's team that won the 1957–58 Cupa României, with coach Dincă Schileru using him the entire match in the 1–0 victory in the final against Progresul București. During his 10 seasons spent with The White-Purples, the team was relegated twice to the second division, but Lereter stayed with the club each time, helping it gain promotion back after one year on both occasions. He also netted five goals in the West derby against UTA Arad, all in the first league, contributing to Politehnica winning two games and earning three draws.

=== UTA Arad ===
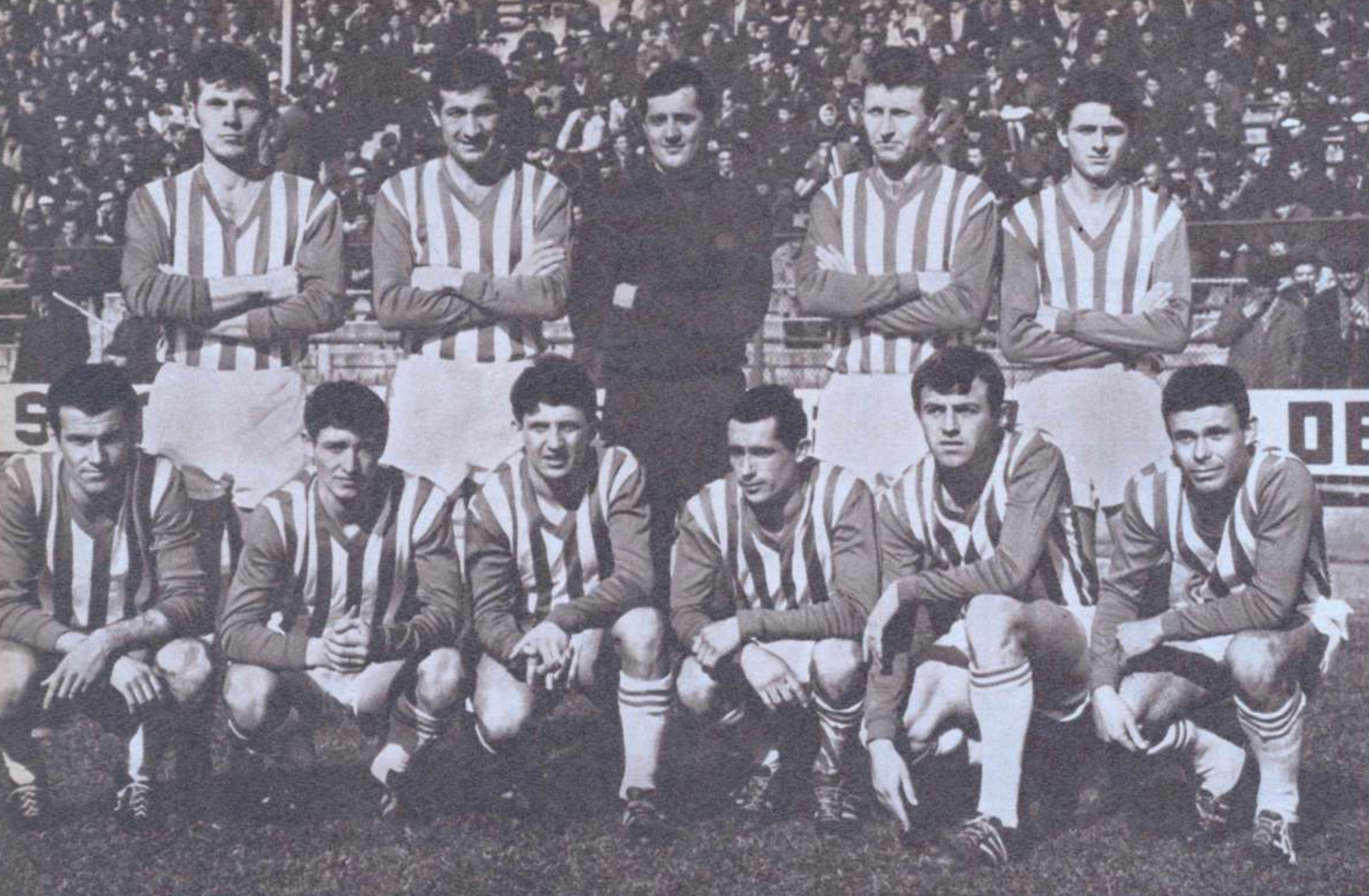
Lereter (back row, second from the left) with UTA Arad in 1968

In 1967, Lereter joined UTA Arad, where under coach Nicolae Dumitrescu he won two consecutive titles in the 1968–69 and 1969–70 seasons. He contributed with 10 goals in 30 appearances in the first season, and seven goals in 29 matches in the second. Lereter also made some European performances with The Old Lady, such as eliminating defending champions Feyenoord in the 1970–71 European Cup season. Subsequently, he played eight games in the 1971–72 UEFA Cup campaign when the team reached the quarter-finals where they were eliminated by Tottenham Hotspur who eventually won the competition. On 16 October 1971, while playing for UTA in a match against Argeș Pitești, he became the first footballer to reach 300 Divizia A appearances. This milestone led the press to coin the term "Iosif Lereter Club" for any footballer achieving this feat in the Romanian top-league. He made his last Divizia A appearance on 1 October 1972 in UTA's 4–2 loss to Jiul Petroșani, totaling 327 appearances with 79 goals in the competition and 16 appearances in European competitions.

== International career ==
Lereter played one game for Romania when coach Ilie Oană used him on 19 September 1965 in a 3–1 loss to Czechoslovakia during the 1966 World Cup qualifiers.

== Managerial career and later life ==
After he ended his playing career, Lereter worked for a few years as a manager for Constructorul Timișoara and UM Timișoara. In 1985 he was Politehnica Timișoara's president for 10 months. In 2008, Lereter received the Honorary Citizen of Timișoara title. In 2018 in order to celebrate the 60th anniversary of the 1957–58 Cupa României victory, the Politehnica University of Timișoara awarded him a diploma of excellence.

== Death ==
Lereter died in Timișoara on 26 January 2024, at the age of 90, having spent the last years of his life at a local nursing home.

== Honours ==
Politehnica Timișoara

- Divizia B: 1959–60, 1964–65
- Cupa României: 1957–58

UTA Arad

- Divizia A: 1968–69, 1969–70
