= Petru Șchiopu =

Romanian footballer

Personal information
- Date of birth: 28 April 1947
- Place of birth: Pecica, Romania
- Date of death: 10 October 2014 (aged 67)
- Place of death: Romania
- Height: 1.76 m (5 ft 9 in)
- Position: Midfielder

Senior career*
Years	Team	Apps	(Gls)
1965–1970	UTA Arad	97	(18)
1971–1973	Bihor Oradea	64	(12)
1973–1974	Mureșul Deva	25	(10)
1974–1976	Corvinul Hunedoara		
1976–1977	Mureșul Deva		
1977–1978	Victoria Călan		
1978–1980	Aurul Brad		
1980–1982	UTA Arad	33	(7)
1982–1983	Strungul Arad		
Total		219	(47)

International career
1967–1968	Romania U23	2	(0)
- * Club domestic league appearances and goals

Petru Șchiopu (28 April 1947 – 10 October 2014) was a Romanian football midfielder.

== Club career ==
Șchiopu was born on 28 April 1947 in Pecica, Romania. He began playing football at UTA Arad, making his Divizia A debut on 2 May 1966 under the guidance of coach Nicolae Dumitrescu in a 1–1 draw against Știința Craiova. On 9 November 1966 he scored a hat-trick in a 5–2 home win over rivals Politehnica Timișoara. Under coach Dumitrescu, Șchiopu helped UTA win two consecutive titles in the 1968–69 and 1969–70 seasons. In the first season, he contributed with six goals in 27 appearances and in the second he played 19 games, scoring two times. He also played in two European Cup editions, making one appearance in each of them against Legia Warsaw and Red Star Belgrade respectively, UTA losing both games.

In the middle of the 1970–71 season, Șchiopu left UTA to go play in Divizia B for Bihor Oradea which he helped earn promotion to the first league. However, they were relegated after one season. After spending one more season with Bihor, he went on to have several spells at Divizia B clubs, starting with one season at Mureșul Deva. Then in 1975 he joined Corvinul Hunedoara where in his first season, Șchiopu netted a personal record of 15 goals and in the second he scored nine to help the club get promoted to the first league. He stayed in second league football, returning to Deva for one year, afterwards moving to Victoria Călan and Aurul Brad.

In 1980 he returned for a second spell at UTA, which was in Divizia B, scoring seven goals to help them gain promotion to the first league. There, on 2 September 1981 he made his last Divizia A appearance, playing for The Old Lady in a 1–1 draw against Sportul Studențesc București, totaling 127 matches with 19 goals in the competition. Șchiopu completely ended his career in 1983 after playing one more season in Divizia B for Strungul Arad.

== International career ==
In the late 1960s, Șchiopu made several appearances for Romania's under-23 side.

== Death ==
Șchiopu died on 10 October 2014 at age 67.

== Honours ==
UTA Arad

- Divizia A: 1968–69, 1969–70
- Divizia B: 1980–81

Bihor Oradea

- Divizia B: 1970–71

Corvinul Hunedoara

- Divizia B: 1975–76
