= Vichentie Birău =

Romanian footballer 1929–1992

Personal information
- Date of birth: 1929
- Place of birth: Romania
- Date of death: 1992
- Position: Forward

Senior career*
Years	Team	Apps	(Gls)
1947–1949	Metalosport Oțelu Roșu		
1950	Locomotiva Arad		
1953–1954	Dinamo Brașov	24	(9)
1954–1956	UTA Arad	52	(16)
1957–1960	Metalul Oțelu Roșu		
Total		76	(25)

International career
1955	Romania	1	(0)
- * Club domestic league appearances and goals

Vichentie Birău (1929–1992) was a Romanian football forward. (Note: Vichentie Birău at WorldFootball.net)

== International career ==
Vichentie Birău played one game at international level for Romania in a friendly which ended with a 3–2 loss against East Germany.

== Honours ==
UTA Arad

- Divizia A: 1954 (Note: Vichentie Birău at National-Football-Teams.com)
