= FC UTA Arad =

Association football club in Romania

UTA Arad
- Full name: Asociația Fotbal Club UTA Arad
- Nicknames: Bătrâna Doamnă (The Old Lady); Textiliștii (The Textile Workers)
- Short name: UTA
- Founded: 18 April 1945; 81 years ago as IT Arad; 2013; 13 years ago (refounded) as UTA Bătrâna Doamnă
- Ground: Francisc von Neuman
- Capacity: 11,500
- Owners: UTA Supporters Association; Arad Municipality
- Chairman: Florian Voinea
- Head coach: Adrian Mihalcea
- League: Liga I
- 2025–26: Liga I, 7th of 16
- Website: uta-arad.ro
Home colours	Away colours

Asociația Fotbal Club UTA Arad (Romanian pronunciation: [ˈuta aˈrad]), commonly known as UTA Arad or simply UTA (Uzina Textilă Arad; lit. 'Textiles Factory of Arad'), is a Romanian professional football club based in the city of Arad, Arad County that competes in the Liga I, the top tier of Romanian football.

The team was founded in 1945 as IT Arad, and has won six national titles and two Cupa României. Domestically, UTA is one of the most successful Romanian sides of the 20th century, sharing with Chinezul Timișoara the record for the most title wins by a club not from Bucharest, earning it the nickname Campioana Provinciei ("Provincial Champion"), a record which ended after the conclusion of the 2020–21 season when CFR Cluj claimed its seventh Liga I trophy. UTA Arad's decline began with a transfer to the second division in 1979, after which it rarely appeared in the top flight before being dissolved in 2014. UTA Arad was eventually promoted from the Liga IV and managed to return to the Liga I in 2020.

The team plays in red and white colors at the new Francisc von Neuman Stadium, which was opened in 2020. UTA holds a long-standing rivalry with neighbouring SSU Politehnica Timișoara, with whom it contests the West derby. (Note: The original FC Politehnica Timișoara was dissolved in 2012; after that, SSU Politehnica Timișoara and ACS Poli Timișoara were created, but the latter was also disbanded in 2021. In any case, SSU inherited the fanbase and holds the original brand.)

== History ==
=== 1945–1965 ===
The club was founded on 18 April 1945 under the name ITA Arad, by Francisc von Neuman, owner of Întreprinderea de Textile Arad (lit. 'Arad Textile Enterprise'). The club’s colors, white and red, were inspired by Arsenal, reflecting Neuman's admiration for the English team. ITA played its first match on 27 May 1945, a 2–3 defeat against Banatul Sânnicolau Mic.

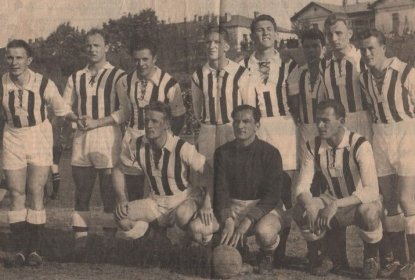
UTA Arad team in 1946–47

On 1 September 1946, the Francisc von Neuman Stadium was inaugurated with a 1–0 win over Ciocanul București.

ITA entered the National Football Championship in the 1946–47 season, which was the first held after the Second World War, and won the national title in its debut top-flight campaign, finishing eleven points ahead of runners-up Carmen București. Coached successively by Zoltan Opata (rounds 1–13), Zoltan Blum (14–19), and Gusztáv Juhász (20–26), the squad featured Alexandru Marky, Gyula Lóránt, Gheorghe Băcuț, Adalbert Pall, Francisc Mészáros, József Pecsovszky, Adalbert Kovács, Ioan Reinhardt, Andrei Mercea, Mátyás Tóth, and Ladislau Bonyhádi, who was the league's top scorer with 26 goals.

In the 1947–48 season, ITA secured a second consecutive league title with a record-breaking goal difference of 129 to 31. Bonyhádi set another record by scoring 49 goals that season. Under Gusztáv Juhász, the team also won the Cupa României, defeating CFR Timișoara 3–2 in the final. New additions to the team included Moise Vass, Zoltan Farmati, Nicolae "Coco" Dumitrescu, and Iosif Stibinger. However, during the 1948–49 season, under coach Carol Burdan, the club’s performance declined, and ITA finished in 9th place.

The club's logo when it was known as Flamura Roșie Arad (1950–1957)

In the 1950 season, the club changed its name to Flamura Roșie and won another national title. That same year, it reached the Cupa României final but lost 1–3 to CCA București. Coached by Francisc Dvorzsák, the team blended established veterans with new players such as Iosif Catranici, Silviu Boitoș, Mihai Mihai Carpineț, Virgil Huzum, József Kapás, Adalbert Țipei, and Ladislau Ristin. In the subsequent 1951 season, the Textile Workers finished in 4th place.

József Pecsovszky, regarded by many as the greatest footballer in the club’s history, left for CCA București ahead of the 1952 season. His absence was keenly felt, as the team, now under coach Gheorghe Albu, experienced a decline and finished only in 8th place.

The 1953 campaign, however, marked a resurgence. Under coach Coloman Braun-Bogdan, the club secured 3rd place and won the Cupa României defeating CCA București 1–0 in the final. Alongside several players from previous successful seasons, the squad also featured key contributions from Francisc Kiss, Gavril Szücs, Gavril Serfözö, Nicolae Popa, Gheorghe Wencesla, Mircea Popovici, and Gheorghe Lupeș.

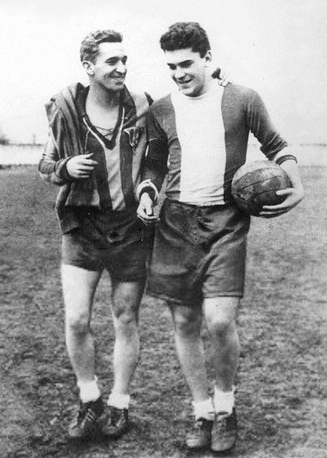
József Pecsovszky (left) won three league titles with UTA Arad

In 1954, Flamura Roșie secured its fourth league title under Braun-Bogdan’s guidance. The squad featured veterans like Dumitrescu, Mercea, Farmati, Kapás, and Serfözö, as well as players such as Francisc Kiss, Iosif Fuleiter, Radin Dușan, Ladislau Sereș, Toma Jurcă, Ilie Don, Gheorghe Váczi, Iosif Szakács, Nicolae Popa, Ion Manole, and Vichentie Birău.

In 1955, Pecsovszky returned to the team, and the following two seasons saw Flamura Roșie finish mid-table, ending 5th under the guidance of Francisc Dvorzsák in 1955 and 6th in 1956, with Ioan Reinhardt on the bench.

On 16 May 1964, an away league match at Știința Timișoara escalated into serious crowd violence after a disallowed equalising goal, leading to a stadium suspension and Timișoara's relegation at season's end. The match is regarded as the origin of the West derby rivalry between UTA and the Timișoara clubs.

=== 1965–1975 ===
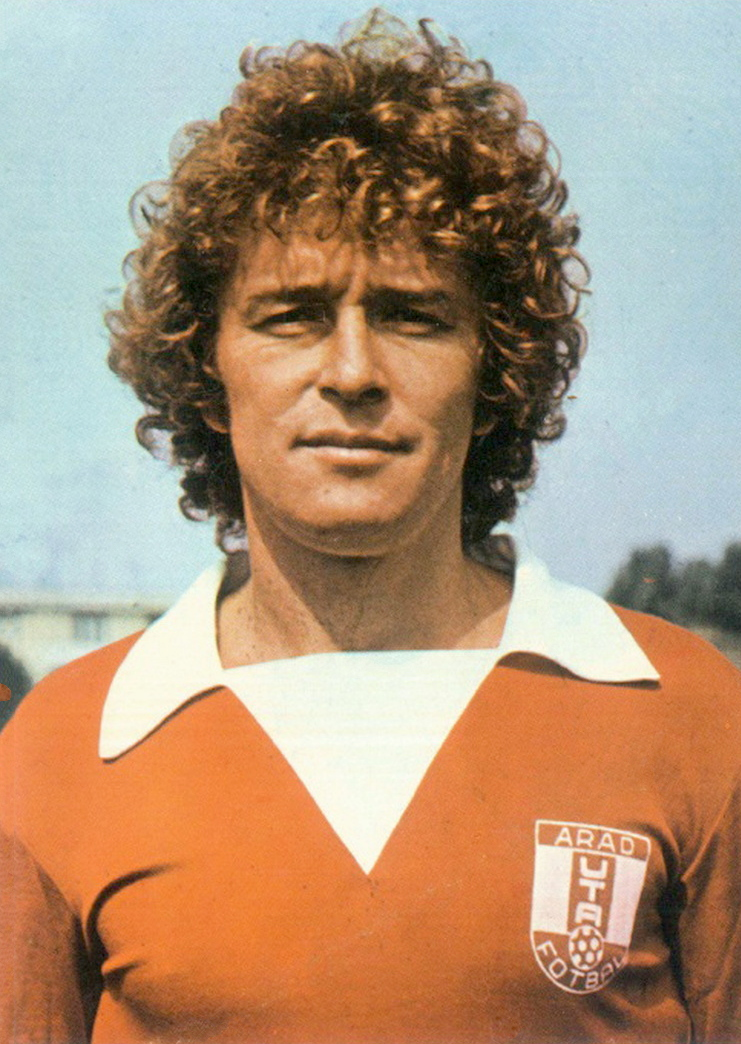
Flavius Domide spent almost his entire career with UTA from 1966 to 1979.

In the 1970–71, the team took fourth place and participated again in the European Champion Clubs' Cup, eliminating the trophy holder at that time, Feyenoord, after a 1–1 at Rotterdam and 0–0 in Arad.

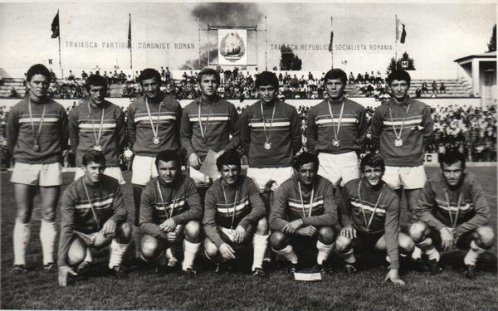
UTA Arad, champions of Romania (1969–70).

In the 1971–72 season the team became vice-champion of Romania and participated in the UEFA Cup, reaching the quarterfinals after overtaking Austria Salzburg (4–1, 1–3), Zagłębie Wałbrzych (1–1, 2–1) and Vitória Setúbal (3–0, 0–1). They were eliminated in the quarter-finals by Tottenham Hotspur; the first game was at home where they lost 2–0. The second leg at away at White Hart Lane in London was a 1–1 draw, however this was not enough and Arad were knocked out 3–1 on aggregate.

=== 1975–2013 ===
The team's decline started in the 1975–76 season, and after it placed 17th in the 1978–79 season, it was reassigned to Divizia B. The decline coincided with strains on Romania's trade-union sport system, which had financed factory-sponsored clubs like UTA since the postwar nationalisation of industry and increasingly favoured elite Bucharest-based clubs by the late 1970s, while the squad's formally amateur players were typically given sinecures in the army, police, or state enterprises, a "shamateur" status common in the sport's socialist era.

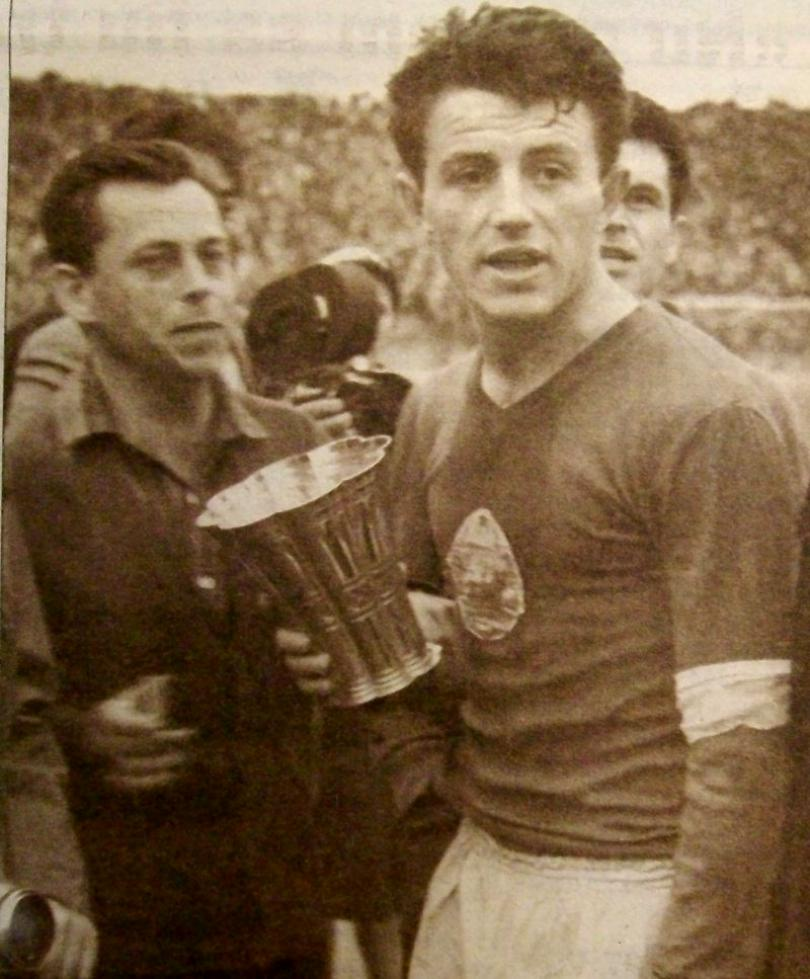
Mircea Petescu, captain of UTA's golden team of the 1970s.

After finishing 3rd in Series III of Divizia B in the 1979–80 season, UTA returned to Divizia A following two years in the second division. Guided by coach Ștefan Czako, the team secured 1st place in Series III in the 1980–81 season. The lineup included Duckadam — Bîtea, Kukla, Hirmler, Giurgiu — Șchiopu, Vaczi, Mușat — Cura, Csordaș, Tisza (Coraș). Other players in the squad were Lovaș, Vuia, Marcu, Iova, Takats, Vușcan, Bodi, and Țirban. The stay in the top tier lasted only one year, ending with a 17th-place finish in Divizia A at the end of the 1981–82 season.

Between 1984 and 1991, UTA occupied the following positions in the third Series of Divizia B: 13th in 1984–85, 4th in 1985–86, 10th in 1986–87, 3rd in 1987–88, 2nd in 1988–89, 2nd in 1989–90, 5th in 1990–91. It also placed in the second Series of Divizia B: 2nd in 1991–92 and 1st in 1992–93.

Between 1995 and 2002, UTA occupied the following positions in the 2nd Series of Divizia B: 5th in 1995–96, 13th in 1996–97, 11th in 1997–98, 2nd in 1998–99, 6th in 1999–2000, 7th in 2000–01 and 1st in 2001–02.

In the summer of 1999, UTA Arad disputed a play-off match at Alba Iulia against Rocar București for promotion in Divizia A, a match in which it lost 0–2. Coach Francisc Tisza organised the following team: Pap – Diaconescu, Botiş, G. Radu (50' Ciubăncan), Găman (76' Baciu), Panin – Todea, Almaşan, Zaha – Mariş, Cl.Drăgan (69' Turcan).

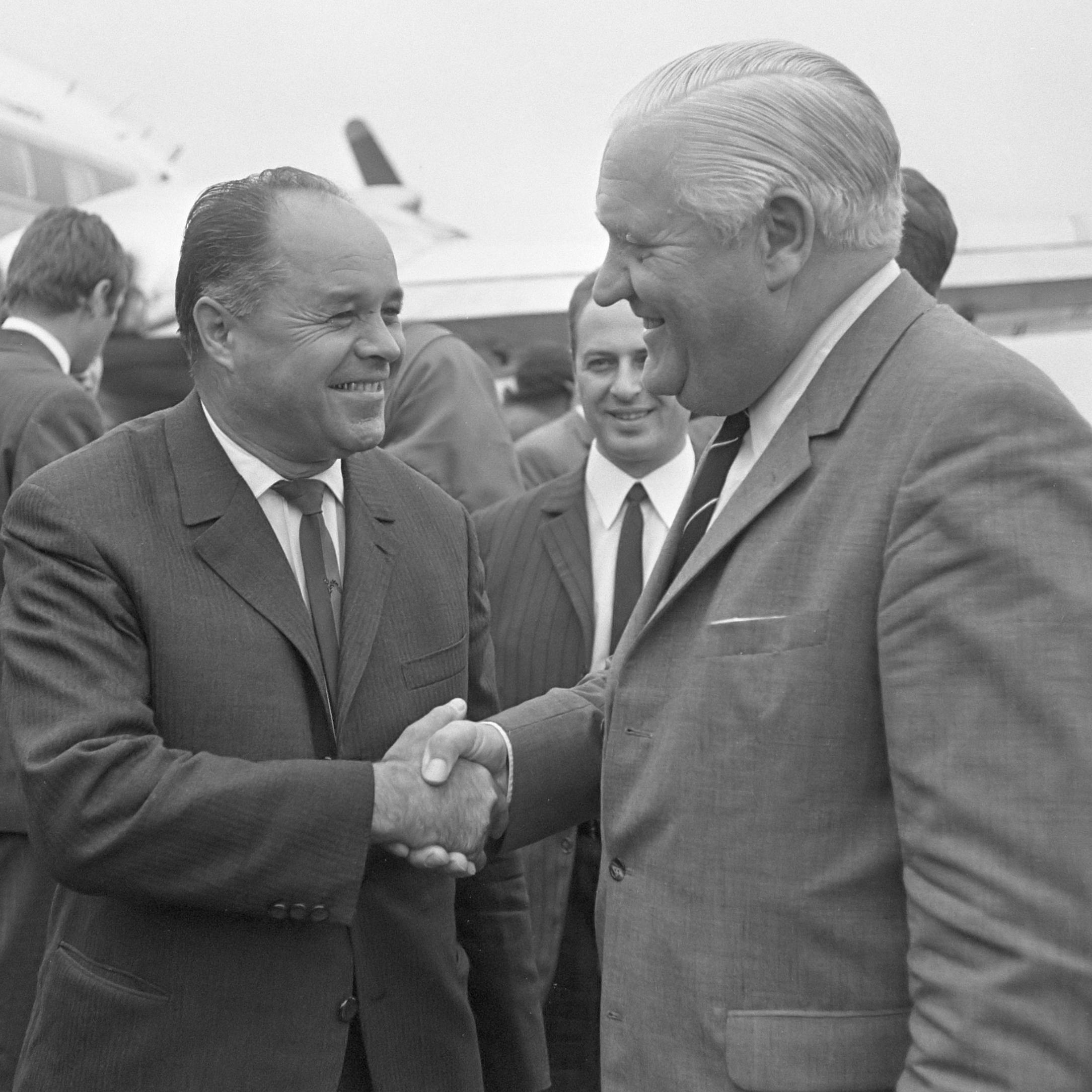
Nicolae "Coco" Dumitrescu (left), former player and manager of UTA.

Following their return to the second division, UTA Arad competed in Series III during the 2003–04 season, finishing 5th under Gheorghe Borugă in the first half of the campaign and Ilie Stan in the second.

The 2004–05 season began with Sorin Cigan as head coach, but he was replaced after just two rounds by Dan Cuedan, who in turn was dismissed after a further two matches. He was succeeded by Silviu Iorgulescu, who led the team in the Round of 16 of the Cupa României, where UTA Arad lost 0–1 to Sportul Studențesc and guided the team to an 11th-place finish, narrowly avoiding relegation.

UTA Arad did not play in this league because after an assignment agreement with Liberty Salonta, UTA took the place of Liberty in Liga I and vice versa in the Liga III.

Thus, the team qualified in Liga I for the 2006–07 season. After club president Nicolae Bara signed with coach Marius Lăcătuş and under his leadership, UTA occupied the 12th place at the end of the season.

In August 2013, businessman Adrian Marțian took over Giovanni Catanzariti's majority stake, promising the financial recovery of the club and bringing back the good results, but by November he lost the support of the supporters and Flavius Domide asked him to leave the club to competent people from Arad.

Another team, supported by a part of UTA fans, called UTA Bătrâna Doamnă, was founded in 2013 by former player Marius Ţucudean. It was enrolled in Liga IV instead of UTA II and received the logo, the record and the colors of UTA from UTA Supporter Club in March 2014, becoming officially UTA Arad. The Liga II team had to change their name to FC UTA SA. At the end of the 2013–14 season of Liga II, UTA SA was excluded from the championship by FRF for not attending two matches and relegated to the 6th League, where it did not sign up and was dissolved.

=== 2013–present ===
UTA Bătrâna Doamnă, promoted in the Liga III at the end of the season after a promotion play-off match against Hunedoara County champion Retezatul Hațeg, won 2–0.

After only one season in the Liga III, the club was promoted back to the Liga II after finishing first in the fourth Series of the league, four points ahead of Nuova Mama Mia Becicherecu Mic.

In their first season after returning to the Liga II, UTA, now known as UTA Bătrâna Doamnă finished second in the second Series of the championship and qualified for a Liga I promotion play-off against Dunărea Călărași and Voluntari. It eliminated Dunărea Călărași 5–4 on aggregate, but lost 1–3 against Voluntari and remained for another season in the Liga II.

In the 2016–17 season, UTA finished third and qualified again for a promotion play-off against Poli Timișoara, one of Politehnica Timișoara successors, and ASU Politehnica Timișoara. UTA lost to both teams (1–2, 1–3).

Chronology of names
Name	Period
ITA Arad	1945–1949
Flamura Roșie Arad	1950–1957
UTA Arad	1958–2014
UTA Bătrâna Doamnă Arad	2014–2017
UTA Arad	2017–present

In the summer of 2017, FRF has officialized that UTA Bătrâna Doamnă changed its name back to FC UTA Arad being the official and legal successor of the old club.

UTA returned to Liga I in the 2020–21 season after winning the 2019–20 Liga II title under coach László Balint, ending a twelve-year absence from the top flight. Balint led the side until 2023, when he was succeeded by Mircea Rednic, under whom UTA reached the semi-finals of the 2022–23 Cupa României and recorded its best Liga I finish in decades in 2023–24. Rednic left by mutual agreement in May 2025 and was replaced by Adrian Mihalcea, who had previously managed the club in the second division.

In August 2025, amid debts of around 11 million lei (about €2.2 million), UTA entered concordat preventiv, a pre-insolvency restructuring procedure under Romanian law, and creditors later approved a plan rescheduling more than €3 million of debt over three years. The club's concordat status barred it from applying for a UEFA license, leaving it ineligible for European qualification play-offs in 2025–26. Ahead of the 2026–27 season, the club announced MrBit, an online betting and casino operator licensed by Romania's National Gambling Office, as its new principal shirt sponsor.

== Grounds ==
UTA Arad plays its home matches at the Stadionul Francisc von Neuman. Ranked as a UEFA Category 4 stadium, it can host UEFA Europa League semi-finals and UEFA Champions League group stage matches.

The first match at the stadium was a Liga I game played between UTA Arad and Voluntari, which ended in a goalless draw. Due to the COVID-19 pandemic, the game was played without spectators.

The first match with spectators was the 2021 women's Romanian Cup final between U Olimpia Cluj and Heniu Prundu Bârgăului, which ended with a 1–0 win in extra-time for the Cluj team.

The first international game played on the arena was the friendly goalless draw between UTA Arad and Kolubara Lazarevac.

== Honours ==
=== Domestic ===
Chart of UTA Arad's league performance 1946–2017.

==== Leagues ====
- Divizia A / Liga I
  - Winners (6): 1946–47, 1947–48, 1950, 1954, 1968–69, 1969–70
  - Runners-up (1): 1971–72
- Divizia B / Liga II
  - Winners (4): 1980–81, 1992–93, 2001–02, 2019–20
  - Runners-up (6): 1982–83, 1988–89, 1989–90, 1991–92, 1998–99, 2015–16
- Liga III
  - Winners (1): 2014–15
- Liga IV – Arad County
  - Winners (1): 2013–14

==== Cups ====
- Cupa României
  - Winners (2): 1947–48, 1953
  - Runners-up (2): 1950, 1965–66
- Cupa României – Arad County Phase
  - Winners (1): 2013–14
- Cupa Ligii
  - Runners-up (1): 1994

=== European ===
- UEFA Champions League / European Cup
  - Best result: Second round 1970–71
- UEFA Europa League / UEFA Cup
  - Best result: Quarter-finals 1971–72
- Balkans Cup
  - Best result: Group stage 1966–67

== Players ==
=== First-team squad ===
As of 12 October 2026

Note: Flags indicate national team as defined under FIFA eligibility rules; some limited exceptions apply. Players may hold more than one non-FIFA nationality.

No.	Pos.	Nation	Player
1	GK	CPV	Márcio Rosa
2	DF	ROU	Andrei Dorobanțu (on loan from Unirea Slobozia)
3	DF	MKD	Din Alomerovikj
4	DF	ROU	Alexandru Benga (Captain)
5	MF	JPN	Sota Mino
6	MF	BUL	Antoni Ivanov
7	FW	KOS	Ismet Sinani
8	MF	ROU	Alin Roman (Vice-captain)
9	FW	ROU	Marius Coman
10	MF	CYP	Marinos Tzionis
11	FW	MAD	Hakim Abdallah
12	GK	ROU	Alexandru Popescu
14	MF	RWA	Samuel Gueulette
15	DF	FRA	Peter Ouaneh
16	MF	KEN	Richard Odada

No.	Pos.	Nation	Player
17	DF	ROU	Roland Sabău
18	MF	ROU	Deean Picioruș
19	MF	ROU	Denis Ile
20	MF	ROU	Denis Țăroi
21	MF	ROU	Andrei Tolcea
22	DF	ROU	Robert Bădescu
23	MF	ROU	Alexandru Matei
26	MF	ROU	Răzvan Oaidă
33	GK	ROU	Andrei Gorcea
42	MF	ROU	Omar El Sawy (on loan from Rapid București)
60	DF	UKR	Dmytro Pospyelov (3rd captain)
72	DF	ITA	Andrea Padula
77	FW	FRA	Jayson Papeau
80	MF	ROU	Alexi Pitu

=== Out on loan ===
Note: Flags indicate national team as defined under FIFA eligibility rules; some limited exceptions apply. Players may hold more than one non-FIFA nationality.

No.	Pos.	Nation	Player
24	DF	ROU	Alexandru Hodoșan (at Progresul Pecica until 30 June 2027)
97	MF	ROU	Denis Hrezdac (at Corvinul Hunedoara until 30 June 2027)
98	FW	ROU	David Ciubăncan (at Minaur Baia Mare until 30 June 2027)
—	GK	ROU	Mark Cioară (at Crișul Sântandrei until 30 June 2027)
—	DF	ROU	Darian Ancateu (at Unirea Sântana until 30 June 2027)
—	DF	ROU	Eric Bărbat (at Minerul Lupeni until 30 June 2027)
—	DF	ROU	Alexandru Budihală (at Unirea Sântana until 30 June 2027)

No.	Pos.	Nation	Player
—	DF	ROU	Darius Iurașciuc (at Gloria Bistrița until 30 June 2027)
—	MF	ROU	Darius Burcă (at Unirea Sântana until 30 June 2027)
—	MF	ROU	Darius Felea (at Unirea Sântana until 30 June 2027)
—	FW	ROU	Robert Baba (at Progresul Pecica until 30 June 2027)
—	FW	ROU	Lucas Câmpan (at Unirea Slobozia until 30 June 2027)
—	FW	ROU	Adrian Dragoș (at Progresul Pecica until 30 June 2027)

== Club officials ==
=== Board of directors ===
Role	Name
Owners	(Romania) UTA Supporters Association (Romania) Arad Municipality
President UTA Supporters Association	(Romania) Claudiu Negru
President	(Romania) Florian Voinea
General Manager	(Romania) Attila Brosovszki
Delegate	(Romania) Dorin Stana
Team Manager	(Romania) Tudor Vasil
Director of Competitions	(Romania) Claudiu Drăgan
Youth Center Director	(Romania) Cristian Păcurar
Youth Center Coordinator	(Romania) Ioan Herman
Press Officer	(Romania) Radu Romanescu
Social Media Department	(Romania) Sergiu Giurgiu

- Last updated: 31 July 2024

=== Current technical staff ===
Role	Name
Head coach	(Romania) Adrian Mihalcea
Assistant coaches	(Romania) Sorin Rădoi (Romania) Ștefan Boroș
Goalkeeping coach	(Romania) Dan Țapoș
Fitness coach	(Romania) Bogdan Hetco
Club doctor	(Romania) Darius Mihart
Physiotherapists	(Romania) Călin Petrică (Romania) Nicolae Tomescu
Masseurs	(Romania) Dan Chiorean (Romania) Dan Ifrim

- Last updated: 10 June 2026

== European record ==
Competition	S	P	W	D	L	GF	GA	GD
Balkans Cup	1	6	1	0	5	4	12	–8
UEFA Champions League / European Cup	2	6	0	2	4	3	17	–14
UEFA Europa League / UEFA Cup	2	10	3	2	5	13	14	–1
Total	5	22	4	4	14	20	43	–23

== League history ==
Season	Tier	Division	Place	National Cup
2026–27	1	Liga I	TBD	TBD
2025–26	1	Liga I	7th	Group Stage
2024–25	1	Liga I	10th	Group Stage
2023–24	1	Liga I	7th	Group Stage
2022–23	1	Liga I	13th (O)	Semi-finals
2021–22	1	Liga I	11th	Round of 32
2020–21	1	Liga I	8th	Round of 16
2019–20	2	Liga II	1st (C, P)	Round of 32
2018–19	2	Liga II	13th	Round of 32
2017–18	2	Liga II	12th	Round of 32
2016–17	2	Liga II	3rd	Fourth round
2015–16	2	Liga II (Seria II)	2nd	Round of 32
2014–15	3	Liga III (Seria IV)	1st (C, P)	Fourth round
2013–14	2	Liga II (Seria II)	11th (R)	Fifth round
2012–13	2	Liga II (Seria II)	4th	Fifth round
2011–12	2	Liga II (Seria II)	4th	Fifth round
2010–11	2	Liga II (Seria II)	8th	Fifth round
2009–10	2	Liga II (Seria II)	4th	Fifth round
2008–09	2	Liga II (Seria II)	9th	Fifth round

Season	Tier	Division	Place	National Cup
2007–08	1	Liga I	17th (R)	Round of 32
2006–07	1	Liga I	12th	Round of 16
2005–06	2	Divizia B (Seria III)	14th (P)	Fifth round
2004–05	2	Divizia B (Seria III)	11th	Round of 16
2003–04	2	Divizia B (Seria III)	5th	n/a
2002–03	1	Divizia A	16th (R)	Round of 16
2001–02	2	Divizia B (Seria II)	1st (C, P)	n/a
2000–01	2	Divizia B (Seria II)	7th	n/a
1999–00	2	Divizia B (Seria II)	6th	n/a
1998–99	2	Divizia B (Seria II)	2nd	n/a
1997–98	2	Divizia B (Seria II)	11th	n/a
1996–97	2	Divizia B (Seria II)	13th	n/a
1995–96	2	Divizia B (Seria II)	5th	n/a
1994–95	1	Divizia A	18th (R)	Quarter-finals
1993–94	1	Divizia A	11th	Round of 32
1992–93	2	Divizia B (Seria II)	1st (C, P)	n/a
1991–92	2	Divizia B (Seria II)	2nd	n/a
1990–91	2	Divizia B (Seria III)	5th	n/a
1989–90	2	Divizia B (Seria III)	2nd	n/a

== Notable former players ==
The footballers enlisted below have had international caps for their respective countries at junior and/or senior level. Players whose name is listed in bold represented their countries at junior and/or senior level on through the time's passing. Additionally, these players have also had a significant number of caps and goals accumulated throughout a certain number of seasons for the club itself as well.

Romania-Hungary

- (Romania) (Hungary) **Ladislau Bonyhádi**
- (Romania) (Hungary) **Iosif Petschovsky**
- (Romania) (Hungary) **Mátyás Tóth**

Romania

- (Romania) **Alexandru Albu**
- (Romania) **Liviu Antal**
- (Romania) **Paul Anton**
- (Romania) **Ion Atodiresei**
- (Romania) **Mircea Axente**
- (Romania) **Gheorghe Băcuț**
- (Romania) **Ionuț Bălan**
- (Romania) **Cristian Bălgrădean**
- (Romania) **Gavrilă Birău**
- (Romania) **Vichentie Birău**
- (Romania) **Ioan Bogdan**
- (Romania) **Sorin Botiș**
- (Romania) **Dan Stupar**
- (Romania) **Ladislau Brosovszky**
- (Romania) **Marcel Coraș**
- (Romania) **Valentin Costache**
- (Romania) **Marius Curtuiuș**
- (Romania) **Flavius Domide**
- (Romania) Claudiu Drăgan
- (Romania) Lucian Dronca
- (Romania) **Helmut Duckadam**
- (Romania) **Florian Dumitrescu**
- (Romania) **Nicolae "Coco" Dumitrescu**
- (Romania) Adrian Găman
- (Romania) **Gheorghe Gornea**
- (Romania) **Ioan Hora**
- (Romania) **Florin Hidișan**
- (Romania) **Cristian Ianu**
- (Romania) **Alexandru Ioniță**
- (Romania) **Silviu Iorgulescu**
- (Romania) **Florin Iacob**
- (Romania) **Damian Isac**
- (Romania) **Emerich Jenei**
- (Romania) **Adalbert Kovács**
- (Romania) **Claudiu Keșerü**
- (Romania) **Iosif Lereter**
- (Romania) **Adrian Lucaci**
- (Romania) **Dennis Man**
- (Romania) **Cristian Melinte**
- (Romania) **Bogdan Mara**
- (Romania) **Alexandru Marky**
- (Romania) **Andrei Mercea**
- (Romania) **David Miculescu**
- (Romania) **Cristian Mihai**
- (Romania) Ilie Moț
- (Romania) **Adalbert Pall**
- (Romania) **Cristian Panin**
- (Romania) **Nicolae Pantea**
- (Romania) **Ion Pârcălab**
- (Romania) **Mircea Petescu**
- (Romania) **Adrian Petre**
- (Romania) **Eugen Pojoni**
- (Romania) **Ovidiu Popescu**
- (Romania) **Paul Popovici**
- (Romania) **Cornel Râpă**
- (Romania) Ioan Reinhardt
- (Romania) **Ciprian Rus**
- (Romania) **Mircea Sasu**
- (Romania) **Petru Șchiopu**
- (Romania) Viorel Sima
- (Romania) **Iosif Slivăț**
- (Romania) **Iosif Stibinger**
- (Romania) **Sorin Strătilă**
- (Romania) **Dumitru Târțău**
- (Romania) Cristian Todea
- (Romania) **Mihai Țârlea I**
- (Romania) **Mihai Țârlea II**
- (Romania) **George Țucudean**
- (Romania) **Adrian Ungur**
- (Romania) **Gheorghe Váczi**
- (Romania) **Constantin Varga**
- (Romania) Norbert Varga
- (Romania) **Moise Vass**

Albania

- (Albania) Idriz Batha

Argentina

- (Argentina) Maximiliano Laso

Belgium

- (Belgium) Benjamin Van Durmen

Brazil

- (Brazil) Erico
- (Brazil) Roger

Bosnia and Herzegovina

- (Bosnia and Herzegovina) Branko Grahovac

Cameroon

- (Cameroon) Jérémie N'Jock

Central African Republic

- (Central African Republic) (Romania) **Ali Calvin Tolmbaye**

Croatia

- (Croatia) Filip Dangubić

DR Congo

- (Democratic Republic of the Congo) Paul-José M'Poku

Greece

- (Greece) (Romania) Christos Metskas

Guinea

- (Guinea) **Ibrahima Conté**

Hungary

- (Hungary) **Gyula Lóránt**

Italy

- (Italy) Nicolao Dumitru
- (Italy) Remo Amadio

Kenya

- (Kenya) **Eric Omondi**

Lithuania

- (Lithuania) Rolandas Baravykas
- (Lithuania) Karolis Laukžemis
- (Lithuania) Tomas Švedkauskas
- (Lithuania) Modestas Vorobjovas

Martinique

- (Martinique) Damien Dussaut
- (Martinique) **Florent Poulolo**

Mauritania

- (Mauritania) **Aly Abeid**

Moldova

- (Moldova) **Virgiliu Postolachi**

Montenegro

- (Montenegro) **Marko Vukčević**

Netherlands

- (Netherlands) Desley Ubbink

Nigeria

- (Nigeria) Prince Ikpe Ekong
- (Nigeria) John Ibeh
- (Nigeria) Philip Otele

North Macedonia

- (Netherlands) Dejan Iliev

Portugal

- (Portugal) Amoreirinha
- (Portugal) Bruno Simão
- (Portugal) Edson Silva
- (Portugal) João Pedro

Russia

- (Russia) Yevgeni Shlyakov

Serbia

- (Serbia) Nenad Kovačević
- (Serbia) Predrag Pocuca
- (Serbia) Nikola Vasiljević

Slovakia

- (Slovakia) Andrej Fábry

== Former managers ==
- (Romania) Petre Steinbach (1947–1948)
- (Romania) Cicerone Manolache (1976–1977)
- (Romania) Ion "Jackie" Ionescu (1977–1979)
- (Romania) Marcel Pigulea (1986–1987)
- (Romania) Aurel Țicleanu (1991–1992)
- (Romania) Ionuț Popa (1993)
- (Romania) Ion Moldovan (1995)
- (Romania) Ion "Jackie" Ionescu (1996–1997)
- (Romania) Ionuț Popa (1997–1998)
- (Romania) Ionuț Popa (2000–2002)
- (Romania) Gheorghe Boruga (2003)
- (Romania) Ilie Stan (2004)
- (Romania) Sorin Cigan (2004)
- (Romania) Dan Cuedan (2004)
- (Romania) Silviu Iorgulescu (2004–2005)
- (Romania) Marius Lăcătuș (2006–2007)
- (Romania) Ionuț Popa (2009–2010)
- (Romania) Roland Nagy (2010–2012)
- (Romania) Adrian Falub (2012–2013)
- (Romania) Eugen Trică (2013–2014)
- (Romania) Adrian Falub (2014)
- (Romania) Roland Nagy (2014–2016)
- (Romania) Adrian Falub (2017)
- (Romania) Ionuț Popa (2018–2019)
- (Romania) László Balint (2019–2022)
- (Romania) Ionuț Badea (2022)
- (Romania) László Balint (2022–2023)
- (Romania) Mircea Rednic (2023–2025)
- (Hungary) Zoltan Blum
- (Romania) Gheorghe Mulțescu
- (Romania) Coloman Braun-Bogdan
- (Romania) Nicolae "Coco" Dumitrescu
- (Romania) Nicolae Pantea
- (Romania) Gusztáv Juhász
- (Hungary) Zoltan Opata
- (Romania) Ioan Reinhardt
