= Mihai Țârlea (footballer, born 1964) =

Romanian footballer

Personal information
- Date of birth: 10 September 1964 (age 62)
- Place of birth: Arad, Romania
- Position: Forward

Youth career
- 1973–1979: UTA Arad
- 1979–1982: Luceafărul București

Senior career*
Years	Team	Apps	(Gls)
1982–1987	UTA Arad		
1987–1992	Sportul Studențesc București	90	(20)
1992–1994	UTA Arad (Note: The statistics for the 1992–93 Divizia B season are unavailable.)	31	(2)
1995	Motorul Arad		
1995–1996	UTA Arad	4	(0)
Total		125	(22)

International career
1987–1988	Romania	2	(1)

Managerial career
- 1997–2000: Telecom Arad
- 2001–2012: Progresul Pecica
- * Club domestic league appearances and goals

Mihai Țârlea (born 10 September 1964) is a Romanian former football forward and manager. His father, who is also named Mihai Țârlea was also a footballer who played at UTA.

== International career ==
Mihai Țârlea played two games for Romania. He scored in his debut, a friendly which ended 2–2 against Greece.

== Honours ==
UTA Arad

- Divizia B: 1992–93
