= 1967 Cupa României final =

- Event: 1966–67 Cupa României
| Steaua Bucharest | Foresta Fălticeni |
| 6 | 0 |
- Date: 2 July 1967
- Venue: Republicii, Bucharest
- Referee: Iosif Ritter (Timișoara)
- Attendance: 20,000

The 1967 Cupa României final was the 29th final of Romania's most prestigious football cup competition. It was disputed between Steaua București and Foresta Fălticeni, and was won by Steaua București after a game with 6 goals. It was the 8th cup for Steaua București.

Foresta Fălticeni become the first club representing Divizia C which reached the Romanian Cup final.

== Match details ==
2 July 1967
17:30 EET

| Steaua București | 6–0 | Foresta Fălticeni |
|---|---|---|
| Şoo 8', 16'; Negrea 10'; Voinea 38'; Avram 62'; Popescu 71' | Report |

Republicii, Bucharest
Attendance: 20,000
Referee: Iosif Ritter (Timișoara)

| GK | 1 | (Romania) Carol Haidu (substituted off) 60' |
| DF | 2 | (Romania) Lajos Sătmăreanu |
| DF | 3 | (Romania) Emerich Jenei |
| DF | 4 | (Romania) Dumitru Nicolae |
| DF | 5 | (Romania) Bujor Hălmăgeanu |
| MF | 6 | (Romania) Vasile Negrea |
| MF | 7 | (Romania) Dumitru Popescu |
| FW | 8 | (Romania) Sorin Avram |
| FW | 9 | (Romania) Gheorghe Constantin |
| FW | 10 | (Romania) Vasile Şoo |
| FW | 11 | (Romania) Florea Voinea |
Substitutions:
| GK | 12 | (Romania) Vasile Suciu (substituted in) 60' |
Manager:
(Romania) Ilie Savu

| GK | 1 | (Romania) Ţacamaş (substituted off) 46' |
| DF | 2 | (Romania) Fodor (substituted off) 46' |
| DF | 3 | (Romania) Juhasz |
| DF | 4 | (Romania) Gümo |
| DF | 5 | (Romania) Pavel |
| MF | 6 | (Romania) Halasz |
| MF | 7 | (Romania) N. Constantin |
| FW | 8 | (Romania) Oltan |
| FW | 9 | (Romania) Luţac |
| FW | 10 | (Romania) Benic |
| FW | 11 | (Romania) Nae |
Substitutions:
| GK | 12 | (Romania) Boniş (substituted in) 46' |
| DF | 13 | (Romania) Ioniţă (substituted in) 46' |
Manager:
(Romania) Iosif Lengheriu

== See also ==
- List of Cupa României finals
