= Bujor Hălmăgeanu =

Romanian footballer and manager

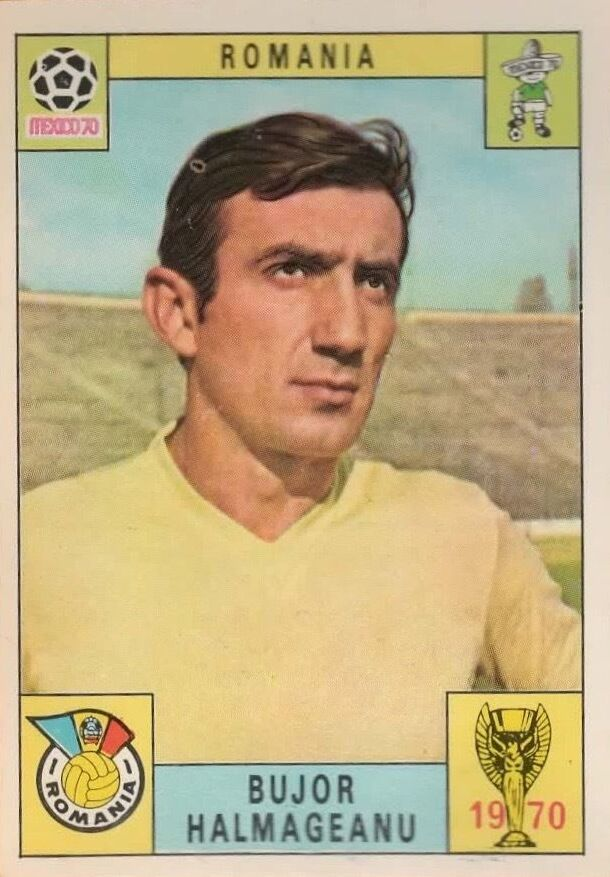

Personal information
- Date of birth: 14 February 1941
- Place of birth: Timișoara, Romania
- Date of death: 23 November 2018 (aged 77)
- Position: Defender

Youth career
- 1954–1958: Victoria Timișoara
- 1958–1960: Știința Timișoara

Senior career*
Years	Team	Apps	(Gls)
1960–1961	Știința Timișoara	20	(0)
1961–1973	Steaua București	177	(1)
1964–1965	→ Petrolul Ploiești (loan)	31	(1)
1973–1974	Dinamo Slatina	7	(0)
Total		235	(2)

International career
1962–1964	Romania U23	9	(0)
1964	Romania Olympic	5	(0)
1965–1972	Romania	17	(0)

Managerial career
- ASA Mizil
- 1988: ASA Târgu Mureș
- 1991: Steaua București
- 1994: Dacia Unirea Brăila
- * Club domestic league appearances and goals

Bujor Hălmăgeanu (14 February 1941 – 23 November 2018) was a Romanian association football defender and manager. He competed for his country at the 1964 Tokyo Olympics, where Romania reached the quarter-finals.

== Club career ==
Hălmăgeanu was born on 14 February 1941 in Timișoara, Romania and began playing junior-level football in 1954 at local club Victoria. In 1958, he joined neighboring club Știința. He made his Divizia A debut on 11 September 1960 under coach Eugen Mladin in Știința's 3–2 away loss to Dinamo Bacău.

In the middle of the 1961–62 season, Hălmăgeanu left Știința to join Steaua București. The team won the 1961–62 Cupa României, but coach Gheorghe Popescu did not use Hălmăgeanu in the 5–1 win over Rapid București in the final. Midway through the 1963–64 season, he went to play for Petrolul Ploiești. There, he played three games in the 1964–65 Inter-Cities Fairs Cup, as the team got past Göztepe in the first round before being defeated by Lokomotiv Plovdiv in the following round. In 1965, Hălmăgeanu returned to Steaua. He won the league title in the 1967–68 season, being used by coach Ștefan Kovács in 25 matches. He won another five Cupa României trophies, but played in only two of the finals—the 6–0 win over Foresta Fălticeni in 1967 and the 2–1 victory against rivals Dinamo București in 1969. During his time with The Military Men, he also played 14 games in European competitions. He took part in the 1971–72 European Cup Winners' Cup campaign, playing all three games as the team reached the quarter-finals, where they were eliminated on away goals following a 1–1 draw on aggregate against Bayern Munich. Hălmăgeanu made his last Divizia A appearance on 20 June 1973 in a 1–1 draw against Steagul Roșu Brașov, totaling 228 matches with two goals in the competition.

Hălmăgeanu ended his career after playing seven matches for Dinamo Slatina during the 1973–74 Divizia B season.

== International career ==
From 1962 to 1964, Hălmăgeanu played nine matches for Romania's under-23 side. He also played for Romania's Olympic team, being chosen by coach Silviu Ploeșteanu to be part of the 1964 Summer Olympics squad in Tokyo where he made five appearances, helping the team finish in fifth place.

Hălmăgeanu played for Romania in 17 matches, making his debut under coach Ilie Oană in a 3–0 victory against Turkey in the 1966 World Cup qualifiers. He played a further three matches in those qualifiers, which included victories against Czechoslovakia and Portugal. Subsequently, he played in a 4–2 win over Switzerland during the Euro 1968 qualifiers. Hălmăgeanu made three appearances in the successful 1970 World Cup qualifiers. However, he missed the final tournament due to an injury. He played two matches in the 1972 Euro qualifiers, including a quarter-final 2–1 loss to Hungary, who advanced to the final tournament.

== Managerial career ==
Hălmăgeanu started his coaching career at ASA Mizil. In 1988, he had his first coaching experience in Divizia A, leading ASA Târgu Mureș for seven matches. Afterwards, he replaced Costică Ștefănescu as coach of Steaua București and led them for 11 games during the 1990–91 season. His final tenure took place in 1994 at Dacia Unirea Brăila. Hălmăgeanu has a total of 28 games managed in Divizia A, consisting of eight victories, six draws and 14 losses.

== Death ==
Hălmăgeanu died on 23 November 2018 at the age of 77.

== Honours ==
Steaua București

- Divizia A: 1967–68
- Cupa României: 1961–62, 1965–66, 1966–67, 1968–69, 1969–70, 1970–71
