= Vasile Iordache =

Romanian footballer and coach

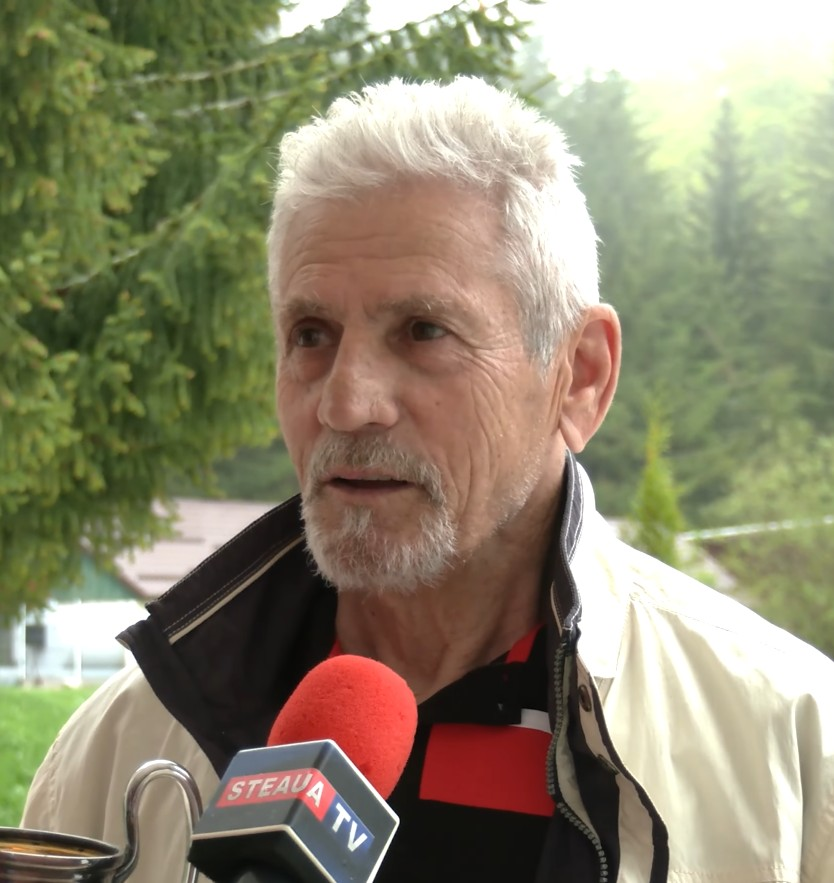
- Iordache in 2025

Personal information
- Date of birth: 9 October 1950 (age 76)
- Place of birth: Iași, Romania
- Height: 1.81 m (5 ft 11 in)
- Position: Goalkeeper

Senior career*
Years	Team	Apps	(Gls)
1969–1971	Politehnica Iași	28	(0)
1971–1984	Steaua București	231	(0)
1984–1986	FCM Brașov	12	(0)
Total		271	(0)

International career
1976–1984	Romania (Note: Including two appearances for Romania's Olympic team.)	25	(0)

Managerial career
- 1990: Universitatea Cluj
- * Club domestic league appearances and goals

Vasile Iordache (born 9 October 1950) is a Romanian former professional football goalkeeper and coach.

== Club career ==
=== Politehnica Iași ===
Iordache was born on 5 November 1946 in Iași, Romania and began playing junior-level football at local club Politehnica under coach Mihai Bârsan. He made his Divizia A debut for Politehnica on 24 August 1969 under coach Justin Șerban in a 2–0 away loss to Farul Constanța.

=== Steaua București ===
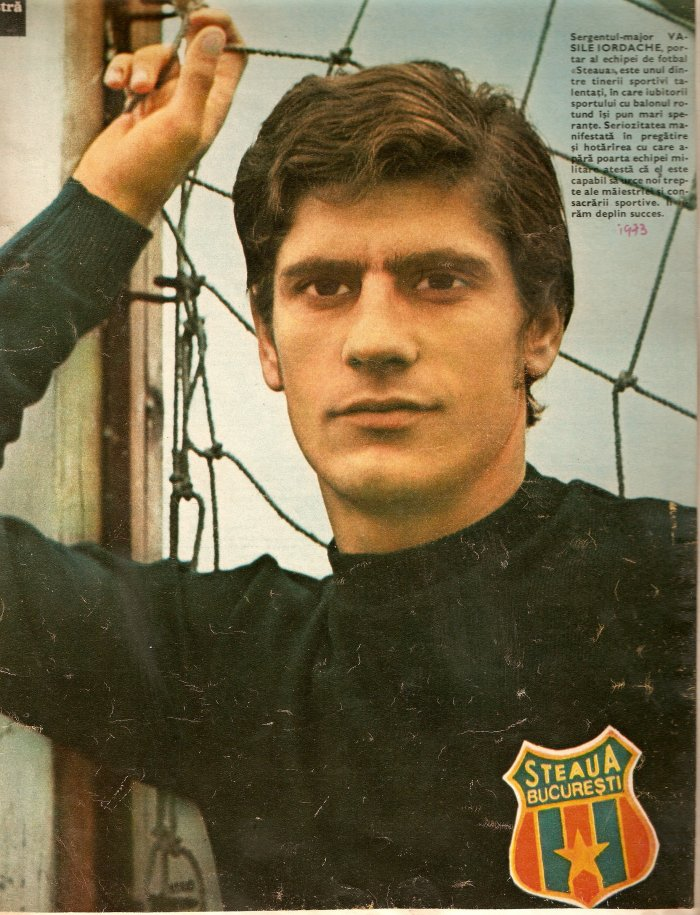
Iordache with Steaua in 1973

Iordache was transferred by Steaua București in 1972 where he learned a lot about goalkeeping from the team's goalkeeper coach Ion Voinescu. He won two Divizia A titles in the 1975–76 and 1977–78 seasons, as coach Emerich Jenei used him in 13 matches for the first title and 14 for the second. Iordache also won two Cupa României, being used by Jenei the entire 90 minutes in the 1976 final in which he kept a clean sheet in the 1–0 victory against CSU Galați. In the 1979 final, he was sent on the field by coach Gheorghe Constantin to replace Rică Răducanu in the 84th minute of the 3–0 victory against Sportul Studențesc București. For the way he played in 1980 and 1981, Iordache was placed fourth on both occasions in the ranking for the Romanian Footballer of the Year award.

During his 12 seasons with The Military Men, Iordache made a total of 231 Divizia A appearances and played nine games in European competitions. Throughout this period, he competed for a spot on the team with other international goalkeepers such as Narcis Coman, Carol Haidu, Dumitru Moraru and Rică Răducanu. He also had a controversial moment when he got upset and left the field during a game with Argeș Pitești after conceding a goal because his defenders did not intervene, coach Jenei was forced to send Moraru to substitute him.

=== FCM Brașov ===
Iordache was transferred from Steaua to FCM Brașov in exchange for Dumitru Stângaciu. There, he made his last Divizia A appearance on 20 November 1985 in a 2–0 away loss to Politehnica Timișoara, totaling 271 matches in the competition.

== International career ==
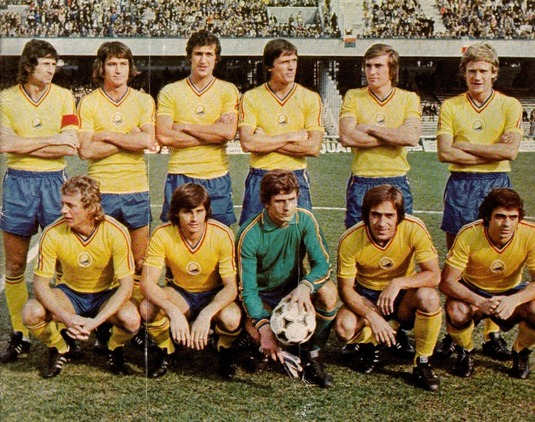
Iordache (center, below) with Romania in 1980

Iordache played 23 matches in which he conceded 27 goals for Romania, making his debut on 12 May 1976 under coach Ștefan Kovács in a 1–0 loss to Bulgaria in the 1973–76 Balkan Cup final. He then went on to play three games in the successful 1977–80 Balkan Cup including appearing for the entirety of both legs in the 4–3 aggregate victory in the final against Yugoslavia.

Iordache also played four games in the 1982 World Cup qualifiers including all the minutes in the 2–1 home victory and the 0–0 draw at Wembley Stadium against England. After the latter game, he was nicknamed "The hero of the Wembley" and received a grade 10 in the Sportul newspaper for the saves he made defending his goal. He claims that after the game in England he had an offer from Nottingham Forest which recently won two consecutive European Cup titles but could not accept it as transfers outside the country were not allowed by Romania's communist regime. Iordache was chosen by Mircea Lucescu to be part of Romania's squad for the Euro 1984 final tournament. However, he did not play, as he was the oldest player in the squad, while Silviu Lung and Dumitru Moraru were preferred as the first-choice goalkeepers. His last appearance for the national team took place on 31 July 1984 in a 1–0 friendly victory over China.

For representing his country at the Euro 1984 final tournament, Iordache was decorated by President of Romania Traian Băsescu on 25 March 2008 with the Ordinul "Meritul Sportiv" – (The Medal "The Sportive Merit") class III.

== Managerial career ==
In 1986, Iordache joined the squad of Steaua București as a goalkeeper coach, helping it win the 1985–86 European Cup and the 1986 European Super Cup. In 1990, he was named head coach of Universitatea Cluj, leading the team from the 5th round until the 17th of the 1990–91 Divizia A season. After leaving "U" Cluj, he returned to Steaua as an assistant coach one year later.

In 1994, Iordache left Romania and for eight years, he coached various clubs in the United Arab Emirates, returning to Steaua in 2002, when he joined the technical team of the club's under-18 side.

Since 2003, he has been part of Cosmin Olăroiu's technical staff at Național București, Politehnica Timișoara, Steaua and Al-Sadd.

== Personal life ==
Iordache's son Andrei was also a footballer who played as a goalkeeper in the Romanian lower leagues.

== Honours ==
=== Player ===
Steaua București

- Divizia A: 1975–76, 1977–78
- Cupa României: 1975–76, 1978–79

Romania

- Balkan Cup: 1977–80, runner-up 1973–76
