= Emerich Jenei =

Romanian football player and coach (1937–2025)

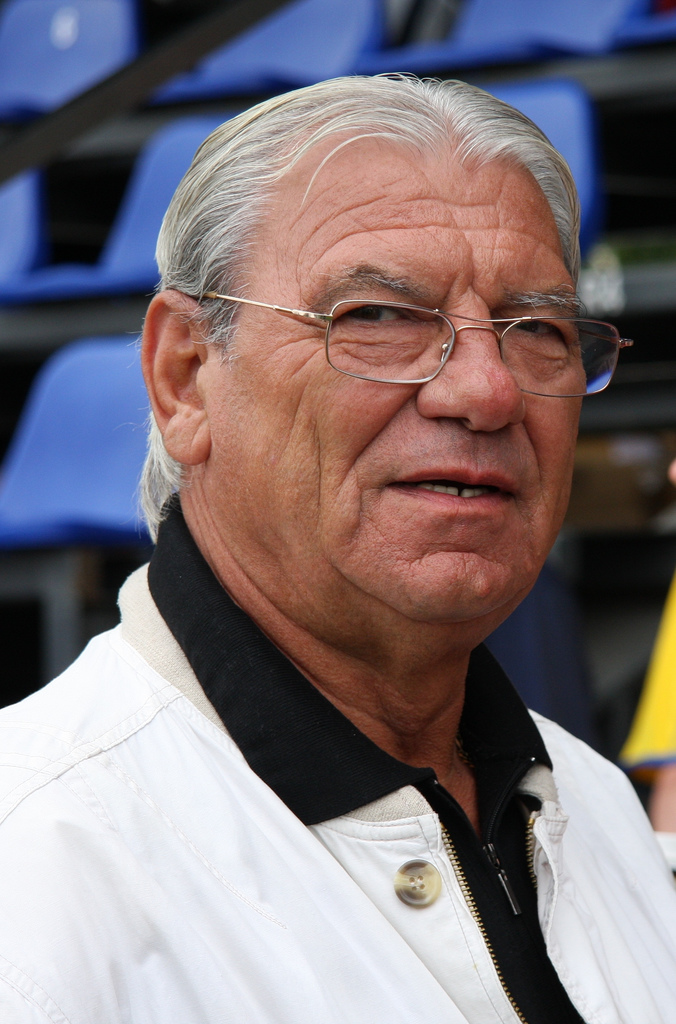
- Jenei in 2008

Personal information
- Full name: Emerich Alexandru Jenei
- Date of birth: 22 March 1937
- Place of birth: Agrișu Mic, Kingdom of Romania
- Date of death: 5 November 2025 (aged 88)
- Place of death: Oradea, Romania
- Height: 1.76 m (5 ft 9 in)
- Positions: Centre-back; defensive midfielder

Youth career
- 1947: 7 Noiembrie Arad
- 1950–1955: Flamura Roșie Arad

Senior career*
Years	Team	Apps	(Gls)
1955	Flamura Roșie Arad	10	(1)
1956	Progresul CPCS București		
1956	Flamura Roșie Arad	11	(1)
1957–1969	Steaua București	259	(7)
1969–1971	Kayserispor	29	(4)
Total		309	(13)

International career
1956	Romania U19		
1959–1964	Romania Olympic	6	(0)
1959–1964	Romania	6	(0)

Managerial career
- 1971–1972: Steaua București (juniors)
- 1972–1975: Steaua București (assistant)
- 1975–1978: Steaua București
- 1978–1979: Bihor Oradea
- 1980–1981: Olimpia Satu Mare
- 1981–1982: CS Târgoviște
- 1983–1984: Steaua București
- 1984–1986: Steaua București
- 1986–1990: Romania
- 1991: Steaua București
- 1992–1993: Hungary
- 1993–1994: Steaua București
- 1994: Parmalat
- 1995: Panionios
- 1996: Universitatea Craiova
- 1998–2000: Steaua București
- 2000: Romania
- * Club domestic league appearances and goals

Emerich Alexandru Jenei (Hungarian: Jenei Imre Sándor; 22 March 1937 – 5 November 2025) was a Romanian football player and manager. Considered one of Romania's best managers alongside Ștefan Kovács, Mircea Lucescu and Anghel Iordănescu, Jenei won the European Cup with Steaua București in 1986. Prior to his management career, he had a 21-year playing career for clubs in Romania and Turkey, and the Romanian national team.

In 2023, Jenei was placed 63rd in FourFourTwo magazine's ranking of the best football coaches of all time. He is the second most successful manager in Romania, tied with Dan Petrescu, winning the Romanian championship on six occasions, all with Steaua București. Nicolae Dumitru is ranked first, having won seven championships, all with Dinamo București.

== Early life ==
Jenei was born on 22 March 1937 in Agrișu Mic, Arad County, Romania, to ethnic Hungarian parents of Calvinist faith. As a child, he moved with his family to Losonc (now Lučenec, Slovakia), because his father did not want to serve in the Romanian army. Later, his father became a Hungarian soldier, but following the end of the war, he did not come back and Jenei and his mother moved back to Arad. Two years after they resettled in their old home, Jenei's father, who was held in captivity, unexpectedly returned. Shortly thereafter, Jenei's mother died when he was only 12 years old.

Jenei had aspirations of becoming a lawyer before his professional football career.

== Club career ==
=== Flamura Roșie Arad and Progresul CPCS București ===
Jenei began playing junior-level football in 1947 at 7 Noiembrie Arad. In 1950, he joined the junior center of Flamura Roșie Arad. On 6 March 1955, he made his Divizia A debut under coach Francisc Dvorzsák in a 2–2 away draw against Locomotiva Timișoara. In 1956, he spent a short time at Divizia B club Progresul CPCS București. Subsequently, he returned to Flamura Roșie.

=== Steaua București ===
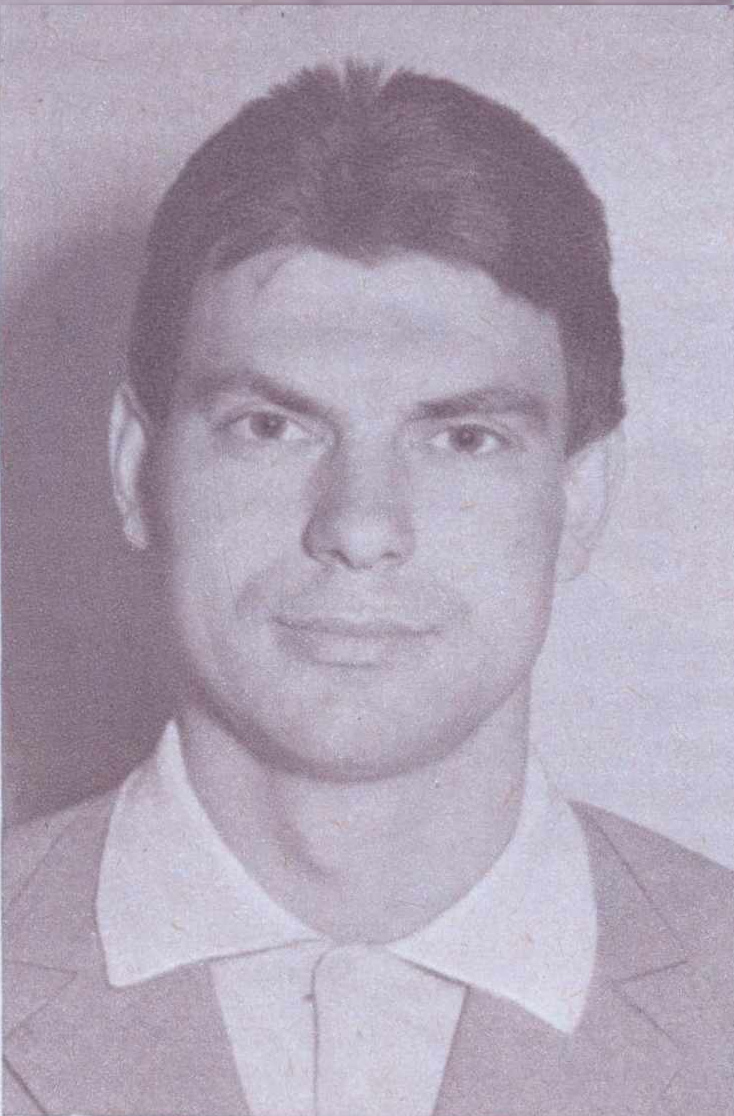
Jenei pictured in 1963

In 1957, at age 20, he signed with Steaua București. The first trophy he won there was the 1959–60 title, with coach Gheorghe Popescu giving him 19 appearances. In the following season, he helped them win another title, this time playing 17 matches under coach Ștefan Onisie. Subsequently, he played the entire match under coach Popescu in the 5–1 win over rivals Rapid București in the 1962 Cupa României final. Jenei won his second Cupa României in 1966, after playing the full 90 minutes under coach Ilie Savu in the 4–0 victory against UTA Arad in the final. With Savu, he won his third Cupa României one year later, playing again the entire match in the final, a 6–0 win over Foresta Fălticeni. Then he made 15 appearances under coach Ștefan Kovacs in the 1967–68 season, as the club won another league title. In his final season, the club reached the 1969 Cupa României final, but Kovacs did not use him in the 2–1 victory against rivals Dinamo București in the final. On 25 May 1969, Jenei made his last Divizia A appearance in Steaua's 3–1 win over Jiul Petroșani, totaling 275 matches with nine goals in the competition. During his 13-season spell with The Military Men, he also made 15 appearances in European competitions. These include a 3–1 win over Borussia Dortmund in the 1957–58 European Cup, but they were eventually eliminated by the German side.

=== Kayserispor ===
In 1969, at age 32, Jenei was allowed by the communist regime to leave Romania together with Steaua teammate Gheorghe Constantin and go play for Turkish side Kayserispor. There, he made 29 appearances and scored three goals over the course of two seasons in the second league, retiring in 1971.

== International career ==
Jenei won six caps for Romania, making his debut under coach Augustin Botescu in a 2–0 loss to Turkey in the 1960 European Nations' Cup round of 16. Subsequently, he played in another 2–0 loss to Czekoslovakia in the quarter-finals of the same competition. His last appearance for the national team took place on 12 May 1963 in a 3–2 friendly victory against East Germany.

Jenei also played six matches for Romania's Olympic team. Notably, coach Silviu Ploeșteanu used him in a 1–1 draw against East Germany and a 4–2 win over Ghana in the 1964 Summer Olympics in Tokyo, helping the team finish in fifth place.

== Managerial career ==
=== Steaua București ===
Jenei's first coaching experience was in 1971 at Steaua București's juniors with whom he won a national junior championship. Subsequently, he worked for the senior side as an assistant coach of his former teammate Gheorghe Constantin in the 1972–73 season. He remained in that position even when Constantin Teașcă became head coach. In 1975, after Teașcă left, he was named head coach of the team, his first game being a 2–1 loss to FCM Reșița. His following game was a 0–0 draw against rivals Rapid București and in the third round of the season, the team earned its first victory, a 2–1 win over Farul Constanța. Steaua finished the season by winning the title and also the Cupa României, after a 1–0 win over CSU Galați in the final. It was the first championship title won by the club in the last eight years. Jenei won another championship title in the 1977–78 season, but was replaced shortly afterwards with Gheorghe Constantin. The reason for his dismissal was that he secured the title with difficulty, specifically on goal difference, having achieved equal points with Argeș Pitești.

=== Bihor Oradea, Olimpia Satu Mare and CS Târgoviște ===
In the 1978–79 season, Jenei coached Bihor Oradea, but the team was relegated, as they finished in last place. Subsequently, in the autumn of 1980, he took over Divizia B club Olimpia Satu Mare, fighting for first-league promotion, but eventually finishing behind UTA Arad. In 1981, he came back to Divizia A football, leading CS Târgoviște for one year.

=== Return to Steaua ===
The beginning of the 1982–83 season found him as coach of Steaua for a second stint. After two years in which he failed to win the championship, Jenei was sacked. However, he was brought back after four months to replace Florin Halagian. He helped the club win The Double at the end of the 1984–85 season, with the Cupa României final being won after a 2–1 victory against Universitatea Craiova.

In the 1985–86 season, Jenei helped Steaua win another title. In the same season, he led the team in the historical European Cup campaign, eliminating Vejle, Honvéd, Kuusysi and Anderlecht. The final against Barcelona was won after the penalty shoot-out with 2–0, courtesy of goals scored by Marius Lăcătuș and Gavril Balint and four penalties saved by Helmut Duckadam. Jenei began the 1986–87 season at Steaua but left to manage Romania, leaving Anghel Iordănescu to take over and successfully win the title.

=== Romania ===
In 1986, Jenei was named head coach of Romania's national team, making his debut on 8 October in a 4–2 friendly victory against Israel. Subsequently, he led the team in five matches during the Euro 1988 qualifiers, including a 3–1 home win over Spain. In the 1990 World Cup qualifiers, Jenei helped The Tricolours finish first in their group, above Denmark, Greece and Bulgaria, thus qualifying for the World Cup after 20 years. In the final tournament, Romania got past the group stage after defeating the Soviet Union, earning a draw against title holders Argentina and losing to Cameroon. In the round of 16, they were defeated by Ireland after the penalty shoot-out.

=== Steaua and Hungary ===
After the World Cup, Jenei returned to Steaua in April 1991, for the fourth time. He helped them eliminate Anorthosis Famagusta and Sporting Gijón in the 1991–92 UEFA Cup, reaching the round of 16 where they were defeated by Genoa. He was dismissed in December 1991.

Jenei was named head coach of Hungary in February 1992, making his debut on 25 March in a 2–1 friendly victory against rivals Austria. He helped The Magyars win the Kirin Cup in 1993, following a win over hosts Japan and a draw against the United States. However, the team performed poorly during the 1994 World Cup qualifiers, and Jenei left after a 1–0 home loss to Greece in March 1993. He led the Hungarians in 14 matches, obtaining six victories, four draws and four losses.

In August 1993, Jenei began his fifth stint as coach of Steaua, and won the championship at the end of the 1993–94 season.

=== Parmalat and Panionios ===
He was appointed in the summer of 1994 to coach Hungarian side Parmalat, where one of his players was compatriot Alexandru Darha. Jenei made his Nemzeti Bajnokság I debut on 15 August 1994 in a 4–4 draw against Zalaegerszeg. After the first eight rounds of the season, the team was in last place without a single victory and Jenei left the club after a 4–0 loss to Vác.

In 1995 he coached Panionios in Greece. There, he had fellow Romanian Marius Predatu as one of his players.

=== Universitatea Craiova ===
In 1996, Jenei was named head coach of Universitatea Craiova, but was sacked after only ten games. Subsequently, he was the Secretary of State in the Ministry of Youth and Sports from 1996 to 1998.

=== Final spell at Steaua ===
Two years later, Jenei returned to Steaua for his sixth and final stint there. Under his guidance, the team won the 1998–99 Cupa României, after a penalty shoot-out victory against Rapid București in the final. Subsequently, he led The Military Men throughout the 1999–2000 UEFA Cup, eliminating Levadia Tallinn, LASK Linz and West Ham United, being defeated by Slavia Prague in the round of 32.

Jenei has a total of 31 matches in European competitions, all with Steaua, resulting in 13 victories, 8 draws and 10 losses. He also amassed a total of 386 matches as a manager in the Romanian top-division, Divizia A, consisting of 218 victories, 79 draws and 89 losses. Jenei is the coach with the most matches led in the Steaua – Dinamo derby, totaling 23 games of which 19 were in the championship and four in the Cupa României.

=== Second spell at Romania ===
In 2000, Jenei was again called to coach Romania's national team. The squad qualified for Euro 2000, but the previous coach, Victor Pițurcă, was sacked shortly afterwards due to a scandal which involved the team's best players, including Gheorghe Hagi and Gheorghe Popescu. In the group stage of the final tournament, they earned a draw against Germany, lost to Portugal and defeated England 3–2. Thus, Romania reached the quarter-finals where they lost 2–0 to Italy.

From both of his spells combined, Jenei has a total of 49 matches as Romania's coach, consisting of 22 victories, 14 draws and 13 losses.

=== Managing style ===
Jenei was known as a calm coach, who spoke politely with his players, and was considered a gentleman. His former player, Marius Lăcătuș said about him:"I never saw him upset, sad, mad. His way of interacting with all the players, all the employees, was exemplary." Another former player, Gavril Balint said:"He commanded respect with gentle words, was forgiving when someone messed up, and motivated us to the fullest just by looking us in the eye." In an interview for the Gazeta Sporturilor newspaper, Jenei claimed he owed his success to the players he coached:"Do you realize what a chance I had?! I coached Puiu Iordănescu, Marcel Răducanu, Bölöni, Gică Hagi, Lăcă, Belo, Gică Popescu, Dan Petrescu, Chivu, Mutu, Adi Ilie... My God, everything that was best in Romanian football in the last half century passed through my hands! I almost always had formidable footballers at my disposal. And, maybe, I also had some flair, some inspiration... Have you seen great coaches with weak players? Especially at Steaua and the national team, I worked with quality people. Both on and off the pitch. Without these extraordinary people, I would probably have remained anonymous".

== Later life and death ==
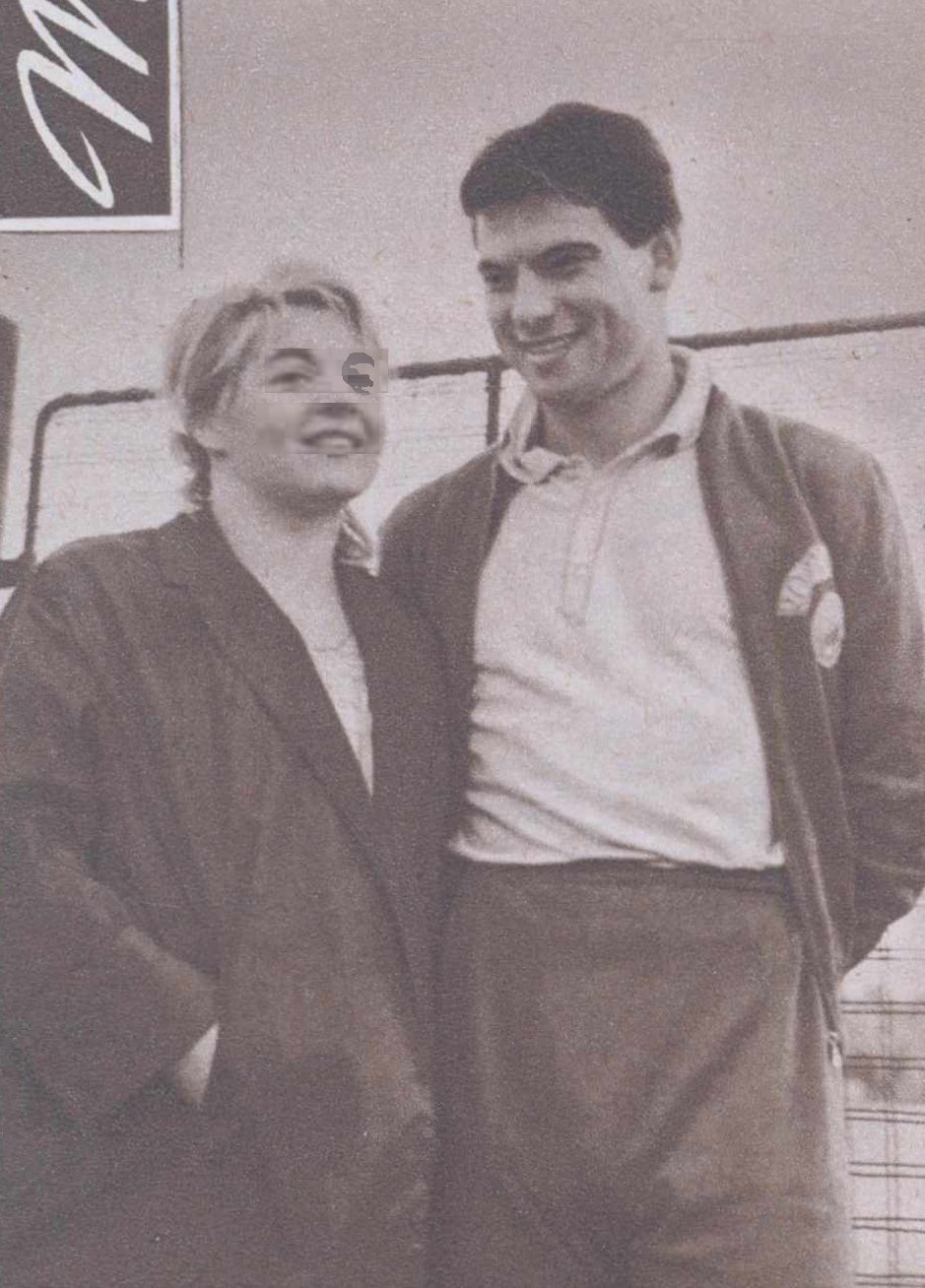
Jenei in 1963 with his first wife actress Vasilica Tastaman, with whom he had a son.

In June 2000, Jenei decided to retire from coaching. After that date, Jenei was president of Bihor Oradea and also worked for the Romanian Football Federation. Journalist Mircea Bradu wrote a book about him titled A fi sau a nu fi antrenor (To be or not to be a coach), which was released in 2006. Subsequently, in 2008, a second volume was published by Bradu, titled Singur printre actori (Alone among actors).

On 25 March 2008, Jenei was decorated by the President of Romania, Traian Băsescu, with Ordinul "Meritul Sportiv" – (The Order "The Sportive Merit") class II with a beret for his part in winning the European Cup with Steaua București in 1986. In 2017, President Klaus Iohannis awarded him the Order of the Star of Romania in the rank of Knight.

Until her death in 2021, Jenei was married to Ileana, former fencer for Romania, world champion and Olympic medalist. They had a daughter named Cristina. He also had a son named Călin with his first wife, actress Vasilica Tastaman.

Jenei died at a hospital in Oradea, Romania, on 5 November 2025, at the age of 88. Over 1,000 people participated at his funeral, being buried with military honors in the "Rulikowski" Cemetery in Oradea.

== Honours ==
=== Player ===
Steaua București

- Divizia A: 1959–60, 1960–61, 1967–68
- Cupa României: 1961–62, 1965–66, 1966–67, 1968–69

=== Manager ===
Steaua București

- Divizia A: 1975–76, 1977–78, 1984–85, 1985–86, 1986–87, 1993–94
- Cupa României: 1975–76, 1984–85, 1998–99
- European Cup: 1985–86

Hungary

- Kirin Cup: 1993

Individual

- FourFourTwo 63rd Greatest Manager of All Time: 2023
