= 1969 Cupa României final =

- Event: 1968–69 Cupa României
Steaua București	Dinamo București
2	1
- Date: 22 June 1969
- Venue: 23 August, Bucharest
- Referee: Aurel Bentu (Bucharest)
- Attendance: 45,000

The 1969 Cupa României final was the 31st final of Romania's most prestigious football cup competition. It was disputed between Steaua București and Dinamo București, and was won by Steaua București after a game with 3 goals. It was the 9th cup for Steaua București.

== Match details ==
22 June 1969
17:30 EET

Steaua București	2–1	Dinamo București
Voinea 43', 75'	Report	Dumitrache 50'

23 August, Bucharest
Attendance: 45,000
Referee: Aurel Bentu (Bucharest)

GK	1	(Romania) Vasile Suciu
DF	2	(Romania) Lajos Sătmăreanu
DF	3	(Romania) Dumitru Nicolae
DF	4	(Romania) Bujor Hălmăgeanu
DF	5	(Romania) Iosif Vigu
MF	6	(Romania) Dumitru Dumitriu
MF	7	(Romania) Vasile Negrea
FW	8	(Romania) Nicolae Pantea (substituted off) 88'
FW	9	(Romania) Florea Voinea
FW	10	(Romania) Gheorghe Tătaru
FW	11	(Romania) Carol Creiniceanu
Substitutions:
FW	12	(Romania) Vasile Şoo (substituted in) 88'
Manager:
(Romania) Ştefan Kovacs

GK	1	(Romania) Narcis Coman (substituted off) 46'
DF	2	(Romania) Cornel Popa
DF	3	(Romania) Alexandru Boc
DF	4	(Romania) Cornel Dinu
DF	5	(Romania) Constantin Ștefan
MF	6	(Romania) Vasile Gergely
MF	7	(Romania) Mircea Stoenescu
MF	8	(Romania) Radu Nunweiller
FW	9	(Romania) Ion Pârcălab (substituted off) 50'
FW	10	(Romania) Florea Dumitrache
FW	11	(Romania) Mircea Lucescu
Substitutions:
GK	12	(Romania) Ilie Datcu (substituted in) 46'
FW	13	(Romania) Viorel Sălceanu (substituted in) 50'
Manager:
(Romania) Bazil Marian

== See also ==
- List of Cupa României finals
- Eternal derby (Romania)
