= Marin Andrei =

Romanian footballer (1940–2026)

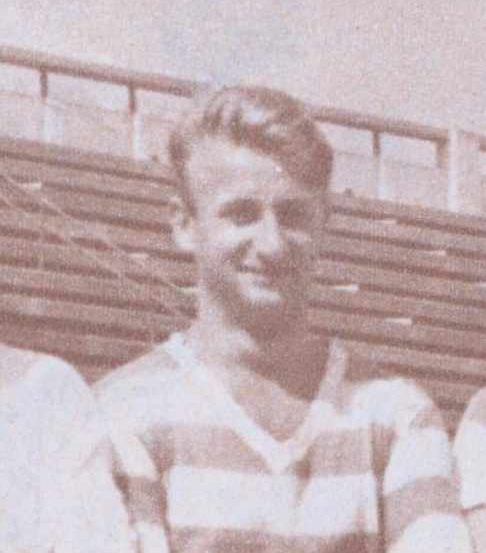
- Andrei in 1963

Personal information
- Date of birth: 22 October 1940
- Place of birth: Târgoviște, Romania
- Date of death: 14 May 2026 (aged 85)
- Height: 1.80 m (5 ft 11 in)
- Position: Goalkeeper

Senior career*
Years	Team	Apps	(Gls)
1959–1962	Metalul Târgoviște (Note: The statistics for the 1959–60 and 1960–61 Divizia B seasons are unavailable.)	23	(0)
1962–1968	Rapid București	73	(0)
1968–1969	Steaua București	8	(0)
1969	Progresul București	8	(0)
1970–1972	Dinamo București	22	(0)
1972–1973	Chimia Râmnicu Vâlcea	13	(0)
Total		147	(0)

International career
1964	Romania Olympic	3	(0)
1965	Romania	1	(0)
- * Club domestic league appearances and goals

Marin Andrei (22 October 1940 – 14 May 2026) was a Romanian footballer who played as a goalkeeper. He competed in the men's tournament at the 1964 Summer Olympics.

== Club career ==
Andrei was born in Târgoviște, Romania on 22 October 1940. He started his senior career in 1959, playing for Metalul Târgoviște in Divizia B. After two seasons, they managed to gain promotion to Divizia A, a competition where Andrei made his debut under coach Valentin Stănescu on 20 August 1961 in a 3–1 victory against UTA Arad. In 1962, he followed Stănescu to Rapid București. Andrei was an important player in the first three seasons spent with The Railwaymen as the team managed to be runner-up in all of them, and also in the 1964–65 season he set a competition record for goalkeepers of 770 minutes without conceding a goal. In the 1966–67 season he helped Rapid win its first title, but Stănescu used him in only three games, because Rică Răducanu was the team's first-choice goalkeeper. Andrei was contacted by Peruvian champion Club Universitario de Deportes in 1967, which wanted a European goalkeeper, but was denied a transfer there by Romania's communist regime. In 1968, Andrei went for one season at Steaua București where he made eight league appearances, having a hard competition with international goalkeepers Carol Haidu and Vasile Suciu, managing to win the Cupa României. He joined Progresul București in the second league for half a year, after which he signed with Dinamo București, thus becoming the first player to play for Rapid, Steaua and Dinamo. He won the 1970–71 Divizia A title with Dinamo in which coaches Nicolae Dumitru and Traian Ionescu used him in only four matches, as Mircea Constantinescu was the team's first-choice goalkeeper. Andrei also made three appearances for the club in the 1971–72 European Cup, helping them get past Spartak Trnava in the first round, keeping a clean sheet in the first leg, but they got eliminated in the following round by Feyenoord. He made his last Divizia A appearance on 5 December 1971 in Dinamo's 3–1 away loss to SC Bacău, totaling 126 matches in the competition. Andrei ended his career after playing one season in the second league for Chimia Râmnicu Vâlcea with whom he won the 1972–73 Cupa României.

== International career ==
Andrei played one game for Romania on 23 October 1965 under coach Ilie Oană in a 2–1 loss to Turkey in the 1966 World Cup qualifiers. He also played for Romania's Olympic team, starting with a friendly that ended with a 2–1 victory against Yugoslavia. Afterwards he was chosen by coach Silviu Ploeșteanu to be part of the 1964 Summer Olympics squad in Tokyo, appearing in a 1–0 victory against Iran and in a 4–2 win over Ghana, helping the team finish in fifth place.

== Death ==
Andrei died on 14 May 2026, at the age of 85.

== Honours ==
Metalul Târgoviște

- Divizia B: 1960–61

Rapid București

- Divizia A: 1966–67
- Balkans Cup: 1963–64, 1964–66

Steaua București

- Cupa României: 1968–69

Progresul București

- Divizia B: 1969–70

Dinamo București

- Divizia A: 1970–71

Chimia Râmnicu Vâlcea

- Cupa României: 1972–73
