= Narcis Coman =

Romanian footballer

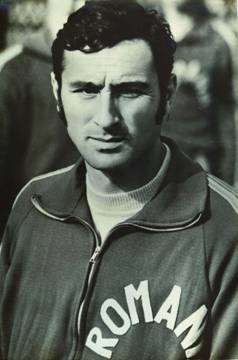

Personal information
- Full name: Narcis Răduț Coman
- Date of birth: 5 November 1946 (age 79)
- Place of birth: Giurgiu, Romania
- Height: 1.84 m (6 ft 0 in)
- Position: Goalkeeper

Youth career
- 1961: Olimpia Giurgiu
- 1961–1964: Victoria Giurgiu

Senior career*
Years	Team	Apps	(Gls)
1964–1965	ȘN Oltenița (Note: The statistics for the 1964–65 regional championship season are unavailable.)	2	(0)
1965–1966	UTA Arad	13	(0)
1966–1968	Argeș Pitești	46	(0)
1968–1970	Dinamo București	30	(0)
1970	Dunărea Giurgiu	5	(0)
1971–1974	Steaua București	34	(0)
1974–1976	SC Bacău	34	(0)
1976–1980	CS Târgoviște (Note: The statistics for the 1976–77 Divizia B season are unavailable.)	69	(0)
1980–1981	FCM Giurgiu		
Total		233	(0)

International career
1962	Romania U18		
1967–1971	Romania Olympic	4	(0)
1967–1978	Romania	8	(0)
- * Club domestic league appearances and goals

Narcis Coman (born 5 November 1946 in Giurgiu) is a retired Romanian footballer who played as a goalkeeper and was selected Romanian Footballer of the Year in 1978.

== Club career ==
"I wasn't a striker, a midfielder or a defender, I was a goalkeeper from the beginning. The first love always remained to be a goalkeeper. A love that has lasted for 63 years and that I have never cheated on"

— Narcis Coman talking about himself in 2022

Coman was born on 5 November 1946 in Giurgiu, Romania. He grew up as a fan of CCA București (for whom he would get to play when the team was named Steaua) and of goalkeeping after seeing a game of the team on TV, being impressed by how Ion Voinescu defended the goal post. He began playing football as a goalkeeper around the age of 12 with his cousin. Three years later, he joined local club Olimpia, where he was coached by Marin Anastasovici, afterwards moving to neighboring team, Victoria. Coman started playing senior level football at ȘN Oltenița in the regional championship, helping it gain promotion to Divizia C where after playing only two games he was transferred by UTA Arad. He made his Divizia A debut on 26 September 1965 under coach Nicolae Dumitrescu, managing to keep a clean sheet in UTA's 2–0 victory against Universitatea Craiova.

After one season, he was transferred by Dinamo București, who then, two weeks later used him as an exchange player for fellow goalkeeper Spiridon Niculescu from Argeș Pitești. Coman played all six games for Argeș in the 1966–67 Inter-Cities Fairs Cup, as the team eliminated Sevilla and Toulouse in the first two rounds, and was defeated in the third round with 1–0 on aggregate by Dinamo Zagreb, who eventually won the competition. Following a notable performance in Argeș's away game in the second leg of the confrontation against Sevilla that ended in a 2–2 draw, the Marca newspaper praised him, stating:"Coman managed some phenomenal saves and blocked Sevilla. Even though he conceded two goals, the Romanian closed the gate in some difficult phases". Sevilla's coach wanted to transfer him, but Coman and the team's officials did not accept, as transfers outside the country were not allowed by Romania's communist regime and if he had accepted the offer he would have risked never seeing his family again. In his second season, he helped the team earn a runner-up position in the domestic league.

Afterwards, he went to play for two seasons at Dinamo București. In the first one, the team earned a runner-up position in the league and reached the Cupa României final where in the 2–1 loss to rivals Steaua București, coach Bazil Marian used Coman in the first half, replacing him with Ilie Datcu for the second. He then spent a short period in his native Giurgiu at Divizia B club Dunărea, but returned to Divizia A football when he went to Steaua. With them, he won the only trophy of his career, the 1970–71 Cupa României, though he did not play in the final as coach Ștefan Kovács chose Carol Haidu for the 3–2 victory against Dinamo. Coman also played four games in the 1971–72 European Cup Winners' Cup campaign, as The Military Men reached the quarter-finals by eliminating Hibernians and Barcelona, being eliminated after 1–1 on aggregate on the away goal rule by Bayern Munich. After the 0–0 in the second leg, he was congratulated for the way he defended his goal post by Bayern's goalkeeper Sepp Maier.

In 1974 he went to SC Bacău in Divizia B, where in the first season he helped the team get promoted to the first league. After one more season spent with Bacău, he went back to Divizia B, signing with CS Târgoviște. Coman helped the team from Târgoviște gain promotion to Divizia A after one season. This spell was the best period of his career, managing to become the first goalkeeper to earn the Romanian Footballer of the Year award in 1978. An important match that helped him achieve this performance was keeping a clean sheet in Târgoviște's 0–0 draw against Universitatea Craiova for which he received a grade 10 in the Sportul newspaper. After making his last Divizia A appearance on 12 March 1980, playing for CS Târgoviște in a 2–2 draw against Jiul Petroșani, Coman went back to his native Giurgiu to play for FCM where he retired after playing only a few games. He has a total of 214 Divizia A appearances and 12 matches in European competitions (including eight in the Inter-Cities Fairs Cup).

== International career ==
Under the guidance of coaches Nicolae Dumitrescu and Gheorghe Ola, Coman helped Romania's under-18 national team win the 1962 European championship. Subsequently, between 1967 and 1971, he played four matches for Romania's Olympic team.

Coman played eight games for Romania, making his debut on 29 October 1967 under coach Constantin Teașcă in a 0–0 friendly draw against Poland in which he managed to keep a clean sheet. He played injured in a 3–0 away loss to Portugal in the 1970 World Cup qualifiers. As he conceded three goals, coach Angelo Niculescu blamed him for the loss, but Coman claims he had informed Niculescu about his injury prior to the game. This controversy ultimately led to Coman's 10-year absence from the national team's squad. In 1978 he was called up by Ștefan Kovács, playing in a 1–0 away loss to Spain in the Euro 1980 qualifiers. His last appearance for the national team took place on 11 December 1978 in a friendly which ended in a 1–1 draw against Israel.

For winning the 1962 European Under-18 Championship, Coman was decorated by President of Romania, Traian Băsescu on 25 March 2008, with the Ordinul "Meritul Sportiv" – (The Medal of "Sportive Merit") Class III.

== Personal life ==
Coman, who was nicknamed "Campionul reflexelor" (The Champion of Reflexes) by the press for his spectacular saves, claimed that he disliked his spells at Dinamo and Steaua due to their very strict rules, but he enjoyed his time at Argeș Pitești and CS Târgoviște. He was known for playing most of his career without gloves because he felt that he had a better grip that way, consequently ending up with three broken fingers. Outside the field, he was known for his bohemian lifestyle. He was considered a ladies' man and enjoyed partying and drinking in pubs, particularly with his friend and Argeș Pitești colleague Nicolae Dobrin. Coman claimed these activities never affected his performance on the football field. In 2013, Coman received the Honorary Citizen of Giurgiu title. A book about him was written by Gelu Brebenel, titled Narcis Coman - prin viață fără mănuși (Narcis Coman - through life without gloves) which was published in 2017.

== Honours ==
=== Club ===
Steaua București

- Cupa României: 1970–71

SC Bacău

- Divizia B: 1974–75

CS Târgoviște

- Divizia B: 1976–77

Romania U18

- UEFA European Under-18 Championship: 1962

=== Individual ===
- Romanian Footballer of the Year: 1978
