= 1962 Cupa României final =

- Event: 1961–62 Cupa României
Steaua București	Rapid București
5	1
- Date: 8 July 1962
- Venue: 23 August, Bucharest
- Referee: Alexandru Tóth (Oradea)
- Attendance: 70,000

The 1962 Cupa României final was the 24th final of Romania's most prestigious football cup competition. It was disputed between Steaua București and Rapid București, and was won by Steaua București after a game with 6 goals. It was the 6th cup for Steaua București.

== Match details ==
8 July 1962
17:30 EET

Steaua București	5–1	Rapid București
Mateianu 11'; Voinea 40'; Constantin 47', 64'; Raksi 85'	Report	Ozon 15'

23 August, Bucharest
Attendance: 70,000
Referee: Alexandru Tóth (Oradea)

GK	1	(Romania) Ion Voinescu
DF	2	(Romania) Vasile Zavoda
DF	3	(Romania) Dragoş Cojocaru
DF	4	(Romania) Gheorghe Staicu
MF	5	(Romania) Emerich Jenei
MF	6	(Romania) Ion Crişan
FW	7	(Romania) Gavril Raksi
FW	8	(Romania) Gheorghe Constantin
FW	9	(Romania) Florea Voinea
FW	10	(Romania) Viorel Mateianu
FW	11	(Romania) Nicolae Tătaru
Manager:
(Romania) Gheorghe Popescu I

GK	1	(Romania) Gheorghe Dungu (substituted off) 46'
DF	2	(Romania) Ilie Greavu
DF	3	(Romania) Ion Motroc
DF	4	(Romania) Dumitru Macri
MF	5	(Romania) Nicolae Neacşu
MF	6	(Romania) Vasile Gherghina
FW	7	(Romania) Constantin Năsturescu
FW	8	(Romania) Titus Ozon
FW	9	(Romania) Ion Ionescu
FW	10	(Romania) Nicolae Georgescu (substituted off) 46'
FW	11	(Romania) Teofil Codreanu
Substitutions:
GK	12	(Romania) Augustin Todor (substituted on) 46'
FW	13	(Romania) Andor Balint (substituted on) 46'
Manager:
(Romania) Ion Mihăilescu

== See also ==
- List of Cupa României finals
- Derbiul Bucureștiului
