= Dumitru Popescu (footballer, born 1942) =

Romanian footballer

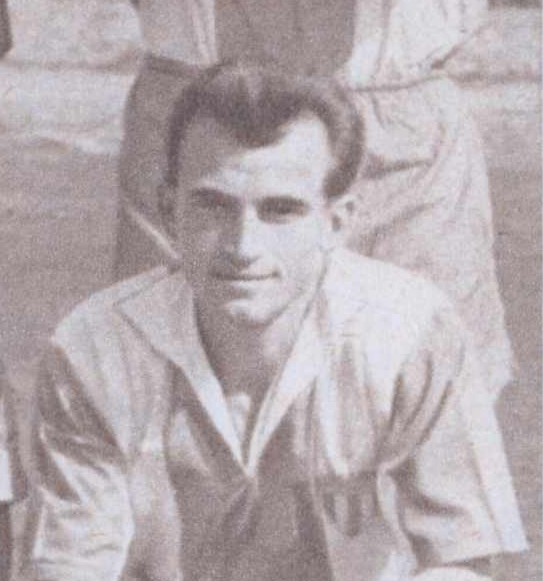

Personal information
- Date of birth: 17 March 1942
- Place of birth: Pucioasa, Romania
- Date of death: 27 December 1997 (aged 55)
- Height: 1.77 m (5 ft 10 in)
- Position: Central midfielder

Senior career*
Years	Team	Apps	(Gls)
1959–1962	Știința București		
1962	Viitorul București	11	(4)
1963–1965	Progresul București	50	(12)
1965–1969	Steaua București	85	(8)
1969–1970	Farul Constanța	11	(0)
1970–1971	Progresul București	2	(0)
1971–1972	Chimia Râmnicu Vâlcea	11	(1)
Total		170	(25)

International career
1962–1966	Romania	7	(0)
- * Club domestic league appearances and goals

Dumitru Popescu (17 March 1942 – 27 December 1997) was a Romanian footballer who played as a midfielder.

== International career ==
Dumitru Popescu played seven games at international level for Romania, including appearances at Euro 1964 and 1968 qualifiers and at the 1966 World Cup qualifiers.

== Honours ==
Steaua București

- Divizia A: 1967–68
- Cupa României: 1965–66, 1966–67, 1968–69
