= Spiridon Niculescu =

Romanian footballer and manager

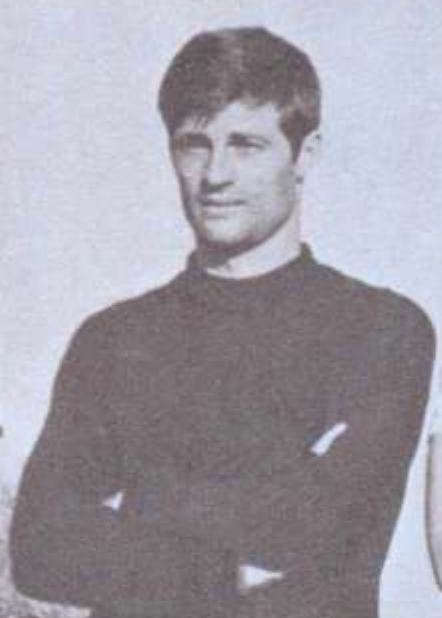
- Niculescu with Dinamo București in 1968

Personal information
- Date of birth: 8 April 1943 (age 83)
- Place of birth: Vidra, Romania
- Height: 1.80 m (5 ft 11 in)
- Position: Goalkeeper

Youth career
- 1961–1962: Dinamo București

Senior career*
Years	Team	Apps	(Gls)
1962–1966	Dinamo Pitești (Note: The statistics for the 1962–63 Divizia B are unavailable.)	48	(0)
1966–1968	Dinamo București	15	(0)
1968–1974	Argeș Pitești	80	(0)
1972–1973	→ Rapid București (loan)	2	(0)
1975–1976	FC Brăila		
Total		145	(0)

International career
1966	Romania U23	3	(0)

Managerial career
- 1976–1977: Celuloza Călărași
- 1984–1985: Corvinul Hunedoara (assistant)
- 1985–1986: Dunărea Galați
- 1990: Flacăra Moreni
- 1994: Dunărea Galați
- 2007–2008: Dunărea Galați
- * Club domestic league appearances and goals

Spiridon Niculescu (born 8 April 1943) is a Romanian former football goalkeeper and manager.

== Club career ==
Niculescu was born on 8 April 1943 in Vidra, Romania and began playing junior-level football in 1961 at Dinamo București. One year later, he joined Divizia B club Dinamo Pitești, helping them earn promotion to the first league after one season. He made his Divizia A debut on 25 August 1963 under coach Ștefan Vasile in a 2–1 home victory against Știința Cluj. The team reached the 1965 Cupa României final where coach Virgil Mărdărescu started him, but after conceding an 11th-minute goal from Remus Câmpeanu, he was replaced in the 17th minute by Constantin Matache in the eventual 2–1 loss to Știința Cluj.

In 1966, Niculescu was transferred from Dinamo Pitești to Dinamo București in exchange for fellow goalkeeper Narcis Coman. There, he played in another Cupa României final in 1968, with coach Bazil Marian using him the entire match in the 3–1 win over Rapid București. Afterwards Niculescu returned to Pitești, and the team was now named Argeș. He started playing in European competitions during the 1968–69 Inter-Cities Fairs Cup second round, appearing in both legs of the 5–3 aggregate loss to Göztepe. In the 1971–72 season he won the league title with Argeș, but played just one game as coaches Titus Ozon and Florin Halagian preferred Vasile Stan as first-choice goalkeeper.

In 1972, Niculescu was loaned to Rapid București for half a season, playing only two league games. He then returned to Argeș where he made one appearance in a 1–1 draw against Fenerbahçe in the first round of the 1973–74 UEFA Cup edition, but they failed to qualify, having lost the first leg with 5–1.

On 29 September 1975, Niculescu made his last Divizia A appearance in a 2–0 away loss to Politehnica Iași, totaling 145 games in the competition with 216 goals conceded. He ended his career in 1976 after one and a half seasons spent in Divizia B at FC Brăila.

== International career ==
In 1966, Niculescu played three games for Romania's under-23 team.

== Managerial career ==
After he ended his playing career, Niculescu worked as a coach in the Romania lower leagues for clubs such as Celuloza Călărași and Dunărea Galați. He was also Ion Nunweiller's assistant at Corvinul Hunedoara. Niculescu had a short spell in the first league at Flacăra Moreni during the 1989–90 Divizia A season, leading them in nine games, winning only two, which resulted in the team's relegation.

== Gallery ==
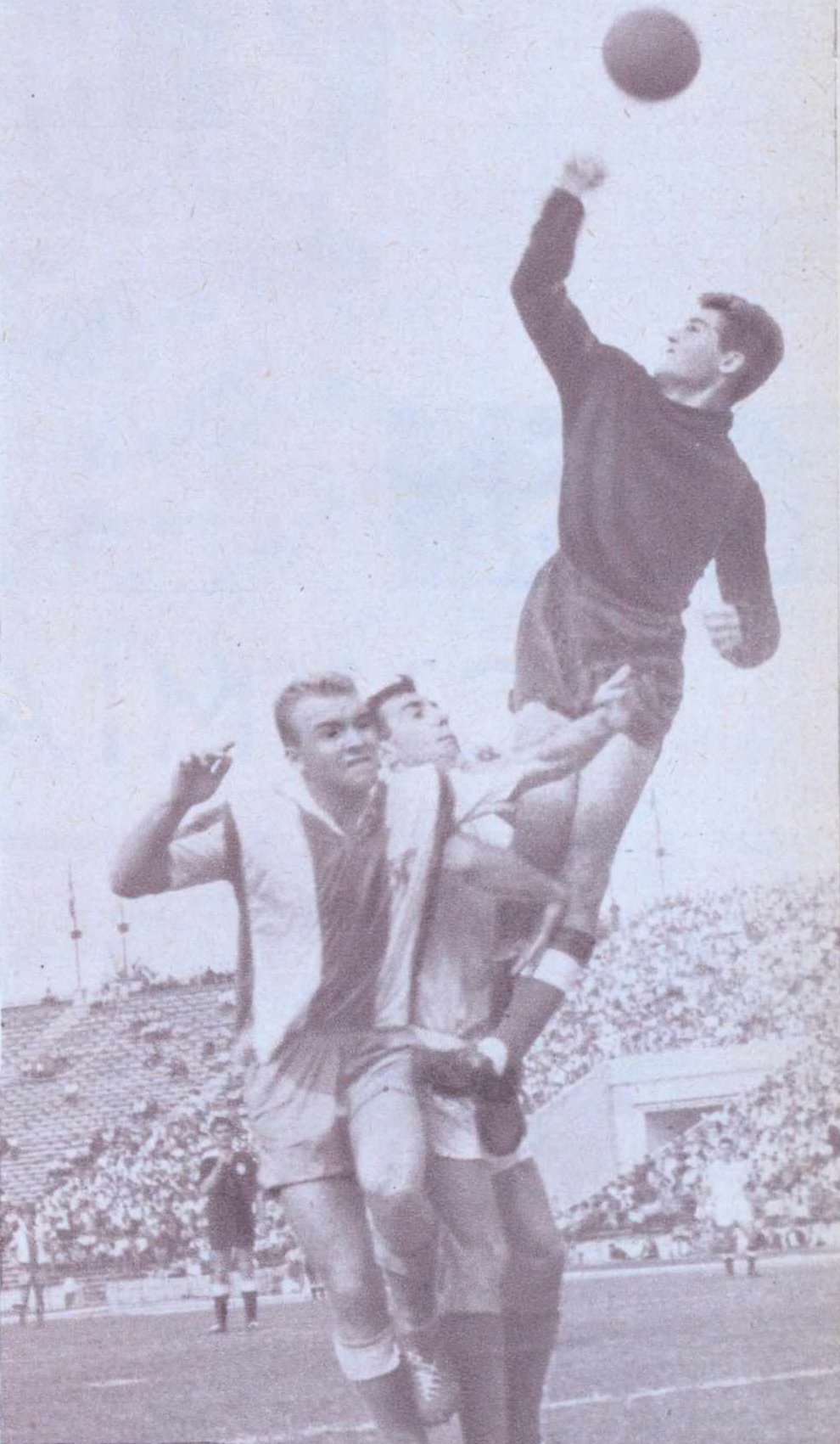
Niculescu in action during a Divizia A match against Progresul București in 1963

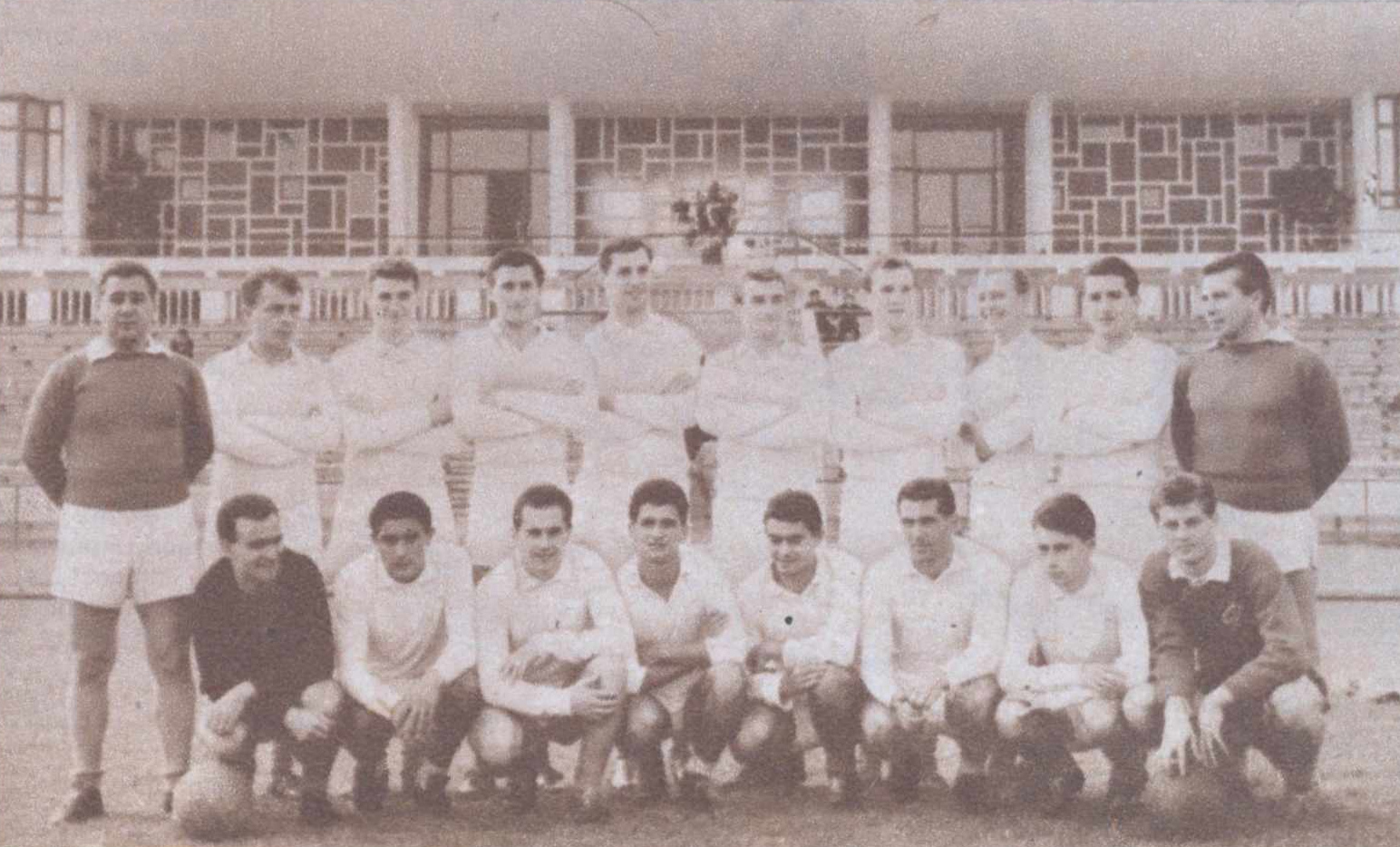
Niculescu (front row, first from the right) with Dinamo Pitești in the 1964–65 season

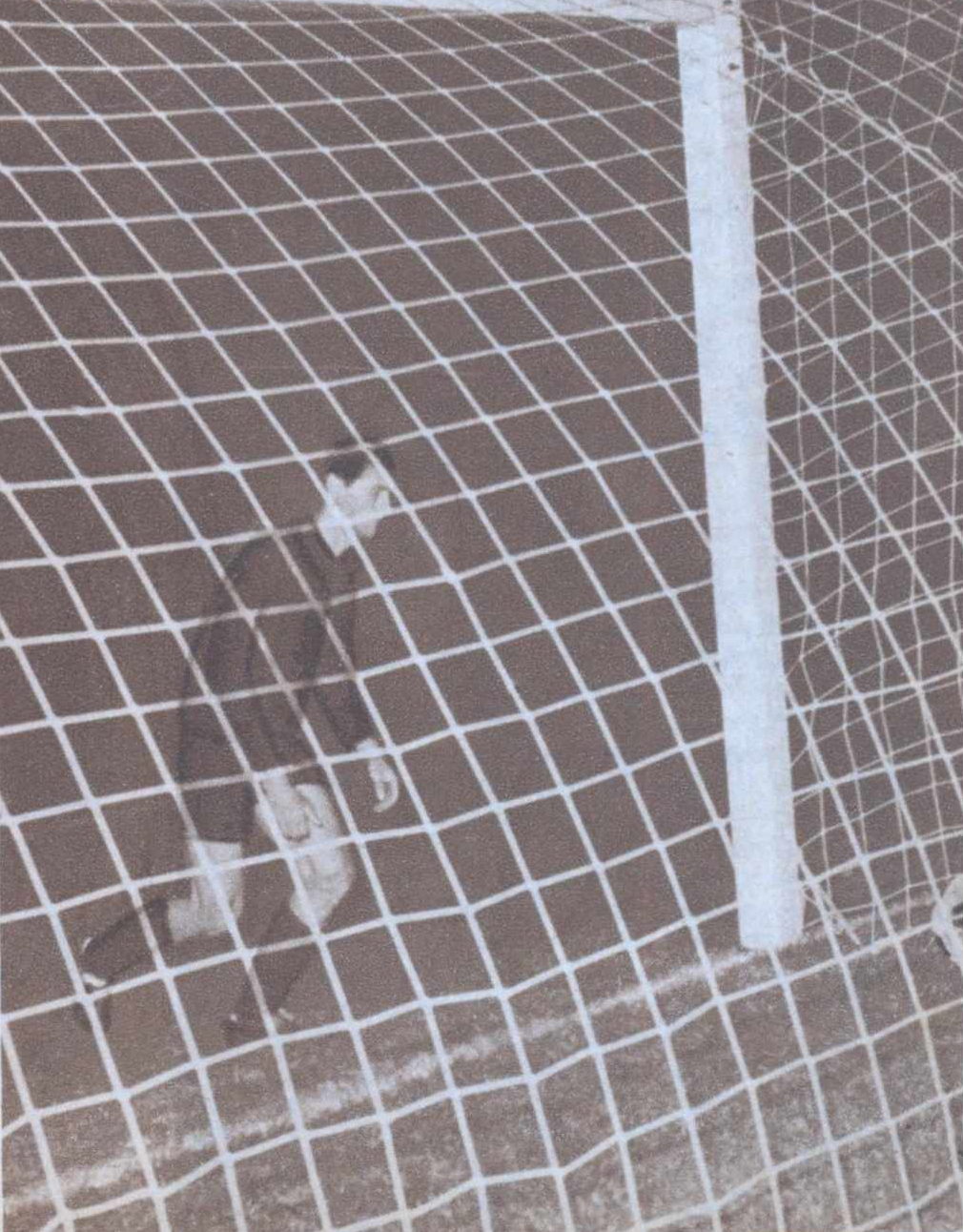
Niculescu (pictured) following Remus Câmpeanu's first goal during the 1965 Cupa României final

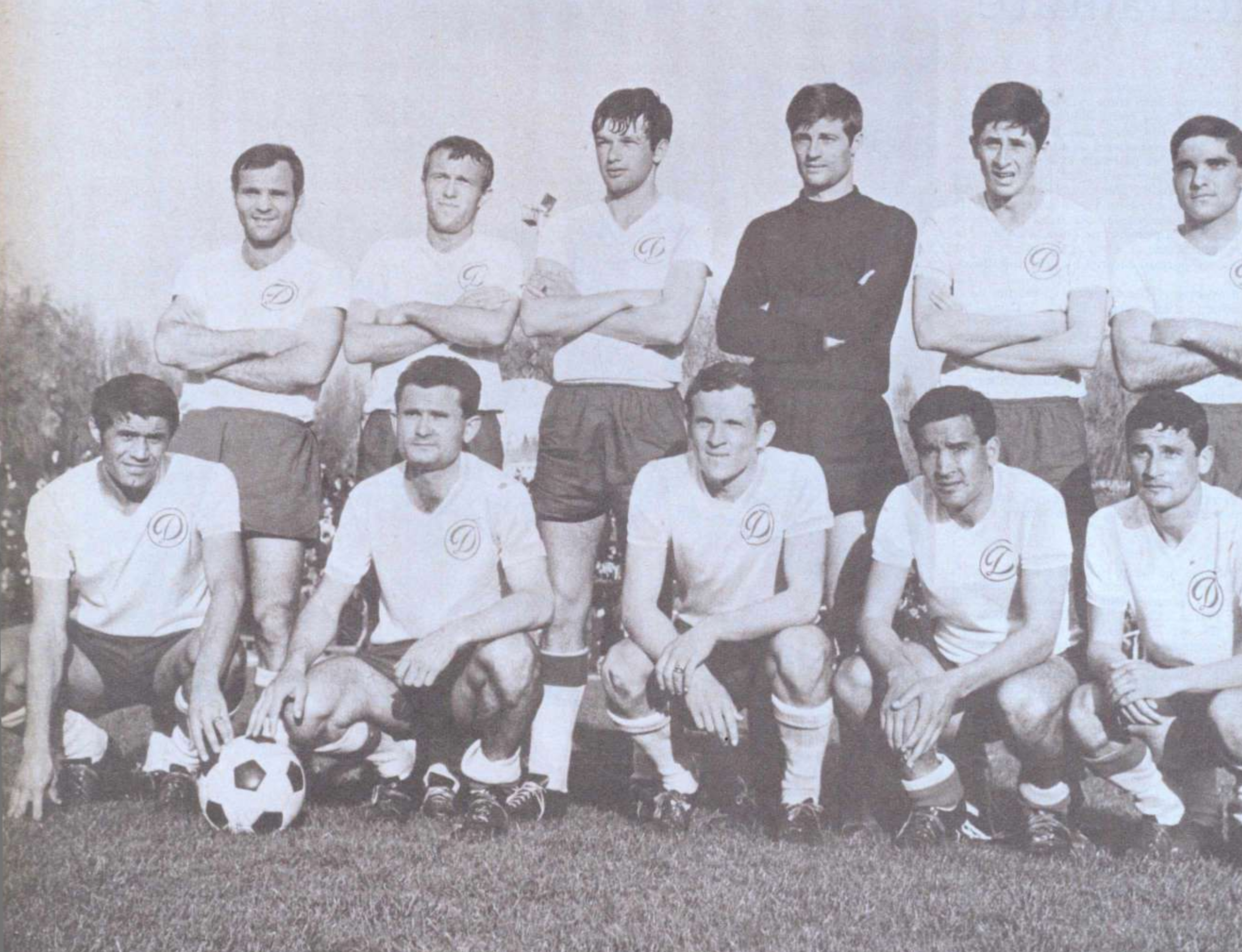
Niculescu (back row, third from the right) with Dinamo București in 1968

== Honours ==
Argeș Pitești

- Divizia A: 1971–72
- Divizia B: 1962–63
- Cupa României runner-up: 1964–65

Dinamo București

- Cupa României: 1967–68
