= Dumitru Nicolae (footballer, born 1943) =

Romanian footballer

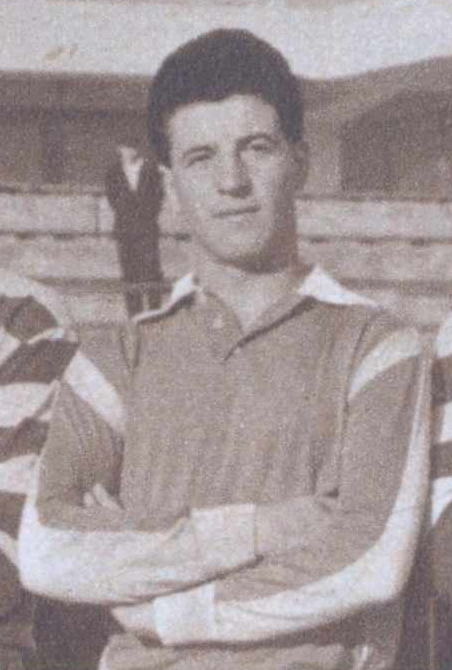

Personal information
- Date of birth: 29 April 1943 (age 83)
- Place of birth: Tinosu, Romania
- Height: 1.79 m (5 ft 10 in)
- Position: Central defender

Youth career
- 1957–1962: Petrolul Ploiești

Senior career*
| Years | Team | Apps | (Gls) |
| 1962–1963 | Petrolul Ploiești | 21 | (0) |
| 1964–1970 | Steaua București | 138 | (0) |
| 1970–1973 | Sportul Studențesc București | 47 | (0) |
| 1973–1975 | CSM Suceava (Note: The statistics for the 1974–75 Divizia B season are unavailable.) | 17 | (0) |
| 1975–1977 | Prahova Ploiești | | |
| Total | | 223 | (0) |

International career
| 1967–1968 | Romania (Note: Including two appearances for Romania's Olympic team.) | 8 | (0) |
- * Club domestic league appearances and goals

Dumitru Nicolae (born 29 April 1943) is a Romanian former footballer who played as a defender.

== International career ==
Dumitru Nicolae played six games at international level for Romania, making his debut in friendly which ended with a 2–1 victory against France. He made two appearances at the Euro 1968 qualifiers and one at the 1970 World Cup qualifiers. He also played two games for Romania's Olympic team at the 1968 Summer Olympics qualifiers.

== Honours ==
Petrolul Ploiești

- Cupa României: 1962–63

Steaua București

- Divizia A: 1967–68
- Cupa României: 1965–66, 1966–67, 1968–69, 1969–70

Sportul Studențesc București

- Divizia B: 1971–72
