= Vidra, Ilfov =

Vidra
- Commune
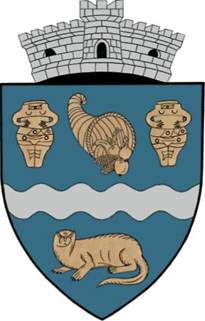
- Coat of arms

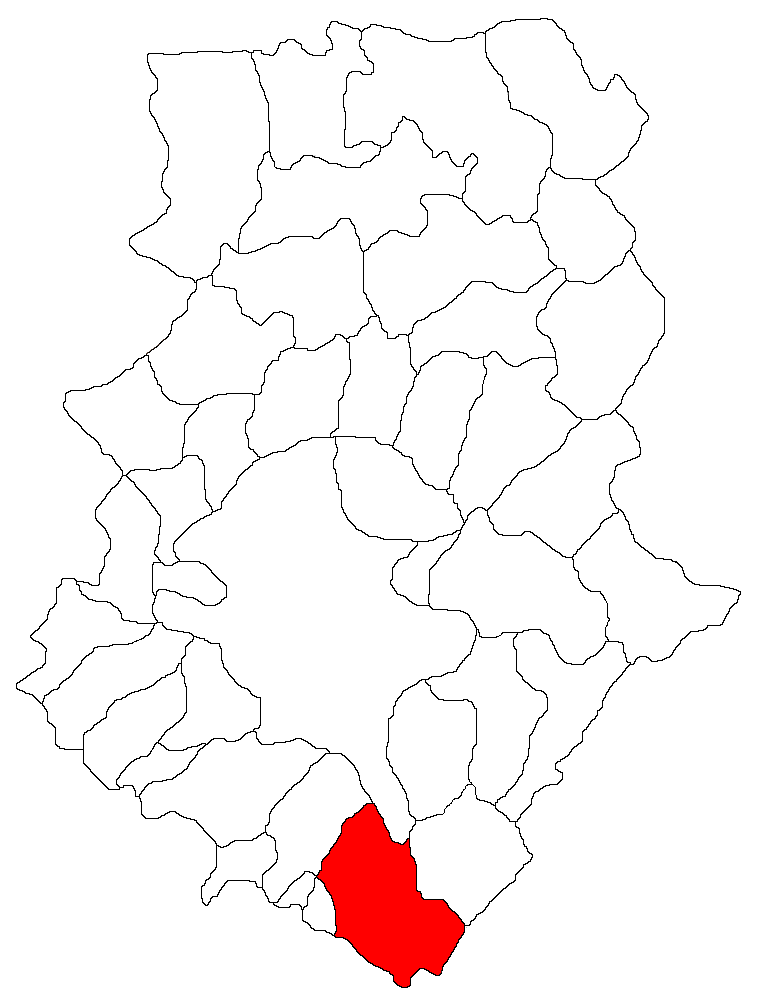
- Location in Ilfov County

- Location in Romania
- Coordinates: 44°16′N 26°9′E
- Country: Romania
- County: Ilfov

Government
  - Mayor (2024–2028): Marian Tudor (PNL)
- Area: 71.01 km^{2} (27.42 sq mi)
- Elevation: 55 m (180 ft)
- Population (2021-12-01): 8,058
  - Density: 113.5/km^{2} (293.9/sq mi)
- Time zone: UTC+02:00 (EET)
  - Summer (DST): UTC+03:00 (EEST)
- Postal code: 077185
- Area code: +(40) 21
- Vehicle reg.: IF
- Website: primaria-vidra.ro

Vidra is a commune in the south of Ilfov County, Muntenia, Romania. Its name means "otter". It is composed of three villages: Crețești, Sintești, and Vidra.

Historical population
Year	Pop.	±%
2002	8,220	—
2011	9,516	+15.8%
2021	8,058	−15.3%
Source: Census data

== Natives ==
- Spiridon Niculescu (born 1943), football goalkeeper and manager
