= 1967–68 Divizia A =

50th season of top-tier football league in Romania

Divizia A
- Season: 1967–68
- Champions: Steaua București
- Top goalscorer: Mihai Adam (15)

The 1967–68 Divizia A was the fiftieth season of Divizia A, the top-level football league of Romania.

== Teams ==
Location of teams in 1967-68 Divizia A

== League table ==
Pos	Team	Pld	W	D	L	GF	GA	GD	Pts	Qualification or relegation
1	Steaua București (C)	26	14	7	5	45	26	+19	35	Qualification to European Cup first round
2	Argeș Pitești	26	14	5	7	40	23	+17	33	Invitation to Inter-Cities Fairs Cup first round
3	Dinamo București	26	13	5	8	34	31	+3	31	Qualification to Cup Winners' Cup first round
4	UTA Arad	26	11	4	11	25	24	+1	26	
5	Petrolul Ploiești	26	12	2	12	27	29	−2	26	
6	Dinamo Bacău	26	12	2	12	33	38	−5	26	
7	Farul Constanța	26	10	5	11	37	32	+5	25	
8	Jiul Petroșani	26	11	3	12	36	36	0	25	
9	Rapid București	26	10	5	11	32	33	−1	25	Invitation to Inter-Cities Fairs Cup first round
10	Universitatea Cluj	26	10	5	11	36	37	−1	25	
11	Universitatea Craiova	26	11	1	14	28	31	−3	23	
12	ASA Târgu Mureș	26	7	8	11	28	41	−13	22	
13	Progresul București (O)	26	6	9	11	23	31	−8	21	Qualification to relegation play-offs
14	Steagul Roşu Brașov (R)	26	8	5	13	20	32	−12	21	Qualification to relegation play-offs

Source: LT
Rules for classification: 1) points; 2) goal difference; 3) number of goals scored
(C) Champions; (O) Play-off winners; (R) Relegated

=== Results ===
Home \ Away	ASA	ARG	UCR	BAC	DIN	FAR	JIU	PET	PRO	RAP	SRB	STE	UTA	UCL
ASA Târgu Mureș	—	3–1	2–0	2–1	2–1	1–1	0–0	0–1	0–0	0–1	2–0	1–1	1–4	3–2
Argeș Pitești	3–0	—	3–1	4–0	1–1	2–0	3–0	1–0	3–1	3–0	0–0	1–1	1–0	2–0
Universitatea Craiova	4–0	2–0	—	1–0	0–1	1–0	2–1	2–0	1–0	4–2	1–0	0–1	2–0	4–1
Dinamo Bacău	1–1	3–0	2–1	—	0–1	4–1	3–2	1–0	3–1	2–0	3–1	2–1	3–1	2–0
Dinamo București	5–2	1–0	2–2	3–0	—	2–1	0–0	1–2	2–1	3–2	1–0	0–1	0–1	2–4
Farul Constanța	3–1	1–0	1–0	4–0	4–0	—	1–2	1–0	2–0	1–1	3–0	4–4	2–2	1–1
Jiul Petroșani	2–1	0–1	2–0	2–0	0–1	1–0	—	2–0	3–0	2–1	4–0	1–1	2–1	2–0
Petrolul Ploiești	1–1	1–0	1–0	1–1	0–1	2–0	3–1	—	1–0	1–0	3–1	1–3	2–1	2–0
Progresul București	4–1	1–1	2–0	2–0	0–0	0–1	2–1	1–0	—	0–0	1–0	0–1	0–2	2–2
Rapid București	1–1	0–2	1–0	3–0	1–3	1–2	3–1	4–0	1–1	—	1–0	3–1	1–0	2–1
Steagul Roşu Brașov	1–0	2–1	2–0	2–0	1–1	1–0	3–2	3–2	1–1	2–1	—	0–0	0–0	0–1
Steaua București	1–2	2–3	4–0	2–0	0–2	3–2	6–1	2–1	1–1	2–0	2–0	—	1–0	1–1
UTA Arad	2–1	0–0	2–0	0–2	1–0	1–0	2–1	1–0	1–1	0–1	1–0	0–1	—	2–1
Universitatea Cluj	0–0	3–4	1–0	2–0	5–0	2–1	2–1	1–2	3–1	1–1	1–0	0–2	1–0	—

Source: LT (in Romanian)
Legend: Blue = home team win; Yellow = draw; Red = away team win.

== Divizia A play-off ==
The 13th and 14th-placed teams of the Divizia A faces the 2nd-placed teams from the series of the Divizia B. The play-off tournament was played in Timișoara.

Pos	Team	Pld	W	D	L	GF	GA	GD	Pts	Promotion or relegation
1	ASA Crișul Oradea (C, P)	3	2	1	0	5	2	+3	5	Promotion to Divizia A
2	Progresul București (P)	3	2	0	1	8	4	+4	4	Promotion to Divizia A
3	Steagul Roșu Brașov (R)	3	1	1	1	4	5	−1	3	Relegation to Divizia B
4	Politehnica Galați (R)	3	0	0	3	3	9	−6	0	Relegation to Divizia B

Source: lastegaru.net
Rules for classification: 1) Points 2) Head-to-head points; 3) Head-to-head goal difference; 4) Head-to-head goals scored; 5) Head-to-head away goals scored; 6) Goal difference; 7) Goals scored.
(C) Champions; (P) Promoted; (R) Relegated

=== Round 1 ===
Team 1	Score	Team 2
Steagul Roșu Brașov (A)	3–1	Politehnica Galați (B)
Progresul București (A)	1–2	ASA Crișul Oradea (B)

=== Round 2 ===
Team 1	Score	Team 2
Steagul Roșu Brașov (A)	1–1	ASA Crișul Oradea (B)
Progresul București (A)	4–2	Politehnica Galați (B)

=== Round 3 ===
Team 1	Score	Team 2
Steagul Roșu Brașov (A)	0–3	Progresul București (A)
Politehnica Galați (B)	0–2	ASA Crișul Oradea (B)

== Top goalscorers ==
Rank	Player	Club	Goals
1	Mihai Adam	Universitatea Cluj	15
2	Florea Voinea	Steaua București	13
3	Constantin Iancu	Farul Constanța	12
4	Petre Libardi	Jiul Petroșani	11
5	Emil Dumitriu	Rapid București	10

== Champion squad ==
Steaua București

Goalkeepers: Carol Haidu (20 / 0); Vasile Suciu (7 / 0).
Defenders: Lajos Sătmăreanu (26 / 0); Dumitru Nicolae (23 / 0); Bujor Hălmăgeanu (25 / 0); Radu Rotaru (19 / 0); Iosif Vigu (4 / 2).
Midfielders: Emeric Jenei (15 / 0); Vasile Negrea (26 / 2); Dumitru Popescu (24 / 5).
Forwards: Sorin Avram (26 / 4); Gheorghe Constantin (19 / 6); Vasile Șoo (17 / 6); Florea Voinea (25 / 13); Dumitru Manea (5 / 0); Nicolae Pantea (6 / 0); Gheorghe Tătaru (18 / 6).
(league appearances and goals listed in brackets)

Manager: Ștefan Kovacs.

== See also ==
- 1967–68 Divizia B
- 1967–68 Divizia C
- 1967–68 Regional Championship
- 1967–68 Cupa României
