= Sorin Avram =

Romanian footballer (1943–2015)

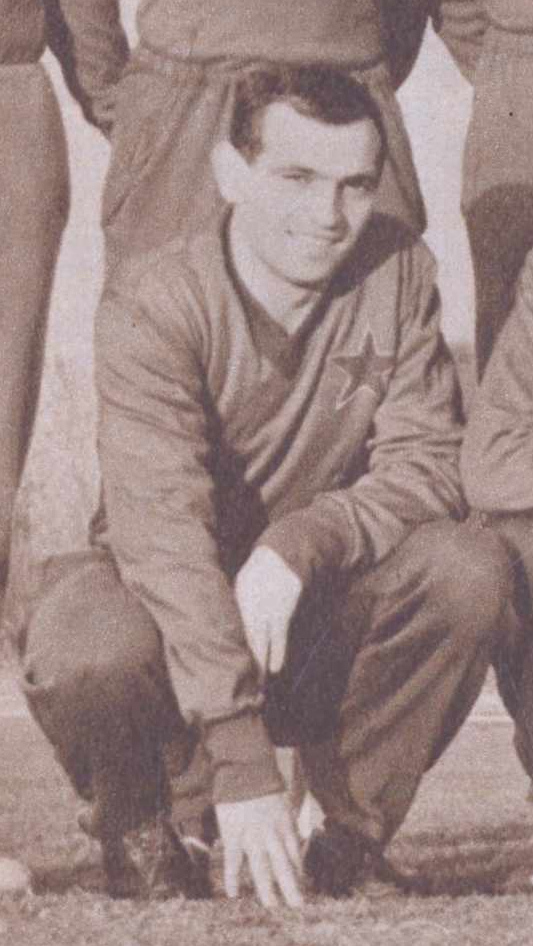
- Avram in 1965

Personal information
- Full name: Sorin Aristotel Avram
- Date of birth: 29 March 1943
- Place of birth: Bacău, Romania
- Date of death: 29 September 2015 (aged 72)
- Height: 1.72 m (5 ft 8 in)
- Position: Striker

Senior career*
Years	Team	Apps	(Gls)
1956–1959	Letea Bacău		
1959–1960	Dinamo Bacău	2	(0)
1960–1961	Steaua Roşie Bacău		
1961–1962	Dinamo Bacău	16	(3)
1962–1963	Viitorul București	11	(2)
1963–1969	Steaua București	124	(25)
1969–1970	Farul Constanţa	18	(2)
1970–1973	Sport Club Bacău	55	(6)
Total		226	(38)

International career
	Romania U23	5	(0)
1964–1967	Romania (Note: Including three appearances for Romania's Olympic team.)	12	(1)

Managerial career
- 1991: FC Bacău
- * Club domestic league appearances and goals

Sorin Aristotel Avram (29 March 1943 – 29 September 2015) was a Romanian football player and coach.

== Career ==
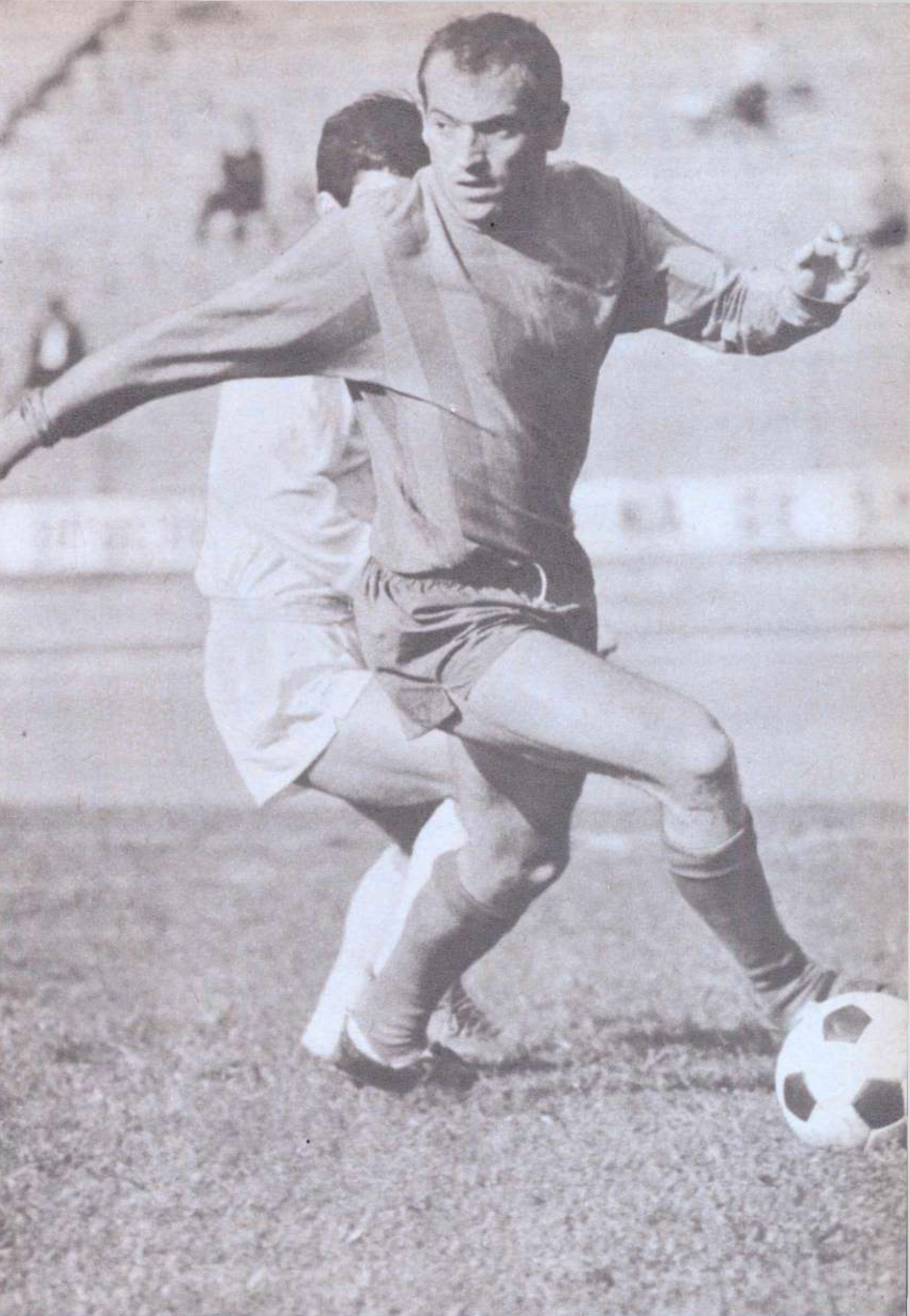
Avram in 1968

He started his career in 1956, by joining the youth team of Letea Bacău. From there he moved to Dinamo Bacău in 1959 and then to Viitorul Bucharest in 1962.

Viitorul Bucharest was a project of the Romanian Football Federation in which they gather the best young players and formed a team which played in the Romanian top division, Divizia A.

From Viitorul, Avram joined Steaua București in 1963. Six years later he joined FC Farul Constanţa and then moved back to FCM Bacău in 1970, ended his career in 1973 at only 30.

He played a total of 226 games in Divizia A, scoring 38 goals. He was Romanian football champion with Steaua București in 1968 and won the Romanian Cup, again with Steaua București, in 1966 and 1967. He also won 12 caps for Romania, scoring one goal. He played for Romania at the 1964 Summer Olympics.

As a coach, he was head-coach of FCM Bacău for nine games during the 1991–92 season.

== Honours ==
Steaua București

- Romanian League: 1967–68
- Romanian Cup: 1965–66, 1966–67, 1968–69
