= Iosif Ritter =

Romanian footballer (1921–2006)

Personal information
- Date of birth: 2 December 1921
- Place of birth: Timișoara, Kingdom of Romania
- Date of death: 30 August 2006 (aged 84)
- Position: Midfielder

Youth career
- 1938: Chinezul Timișoara
- 1938–1940: Rapid București
- 1940: CFR Timișoara

Senior career*
Years	Team	Apps	(Gls)
1941–1945	Rapid București (Note: The Divizia A 1940–41 was the last season before World War II and the Divizia A 1946–47 was the first one after, so the appearances and goals scored during this period for Rapid București are not official.)	4	(1)
1946–1955	Locomotiva Timișoara	173	(5)
Total		177	(6)

International career
1945–1949	Romania	17	(0)
- * Club domestic league appearances and goals

Iosif Ritter (2 December 1921 – 30 August 2006) was a Romanian football midfielder and referee. As a player he reached the 1948 Cupa României final with CFR Timișoara, which was lost with 3–2 against ITA Arad. As a referee, he arbitrated the 1967 Cupa României final. He also arbitrated at international and European club level.

== International career ==
Iosif Ritter played 17 matches for Romania's national team, including 12 at the 1946, 1947 and 1948 Balkan Cups. He was part of Romania's squad at the 1952 Summer Olympics.

== Honours ==
Locomotiva Timișoara

- Cupa României runner-up: 1947–48
