= Carol Haidu =

Romanian footballer (1942–2023)

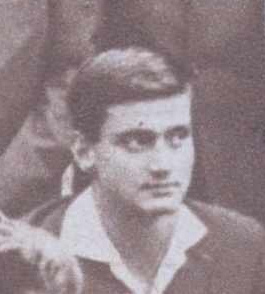
- Haidu in 1963

Personal information
- Date of birth: 3 June 1942
- Place of birth: Râșnov, Romania
- Date of death: April 2023 (aged 80)
- Place of death: Craiova, România
- Height: 1.90 m (6 ft 3 in)
- Position: Goalkeeper

Youth career
- 1958–1961: Luceafarul Brașov

Senior career*
Years	Team	Apps	(Gls)
1961–1964	Steagul Roșu Brașov	40	(0)
1964–1974	Steaua București	118	(0)
Total		158	(0)

International career
1965–1967	Romania	5	(0)
- * Club domestic league appearances and goals

Carol Haidu (also known as Karol Haydu; 3 June 1942 – April 2023) was a Romanian footballer who played as a goalkeeper.

== Club career ==
Haidu was born on 3 June 1942 in Râșnov, Romania with the name of Karol Haydu, but the communist authorities made him change it to Carol Haidu, in order to "sound more Romanian". He began playing junior-level football in 1958 at Luceafarul Brașov. Three years later he joined Steagul Roșu Brașov where he made his Divizia A debut on 1 April 1962 under coach Silviu Ploeșteanu in a 3–1 away loss to Dinamo Pitești.

Haidu went to play for Steaua București in 1964, a team with whom he won the 1967–68 Divizia A title in which coach Ștefan Kovács used him in 20 matches. He also helped the club win five Cupa României, but played in only three of the finals. During his time with The Military Men he also played nine games in European competitions (including one appearance in the Inter-Cities Fairs Cup). He took part in the 1971–72 European Cup Winners' Cup campaign, appearing in three matches as the team reached the quarter-finals by eliminating Hibernians and Barcelona, being eliminated after 1–1 on aggregate on the away goal rule by Bayern Munich. Haidu's last Divizia A appearance took place on 9 December 1973, playing for Steaua in a 1–0 away loss to SC Bacău, totaling 158 matches in the competition.

== International career ==
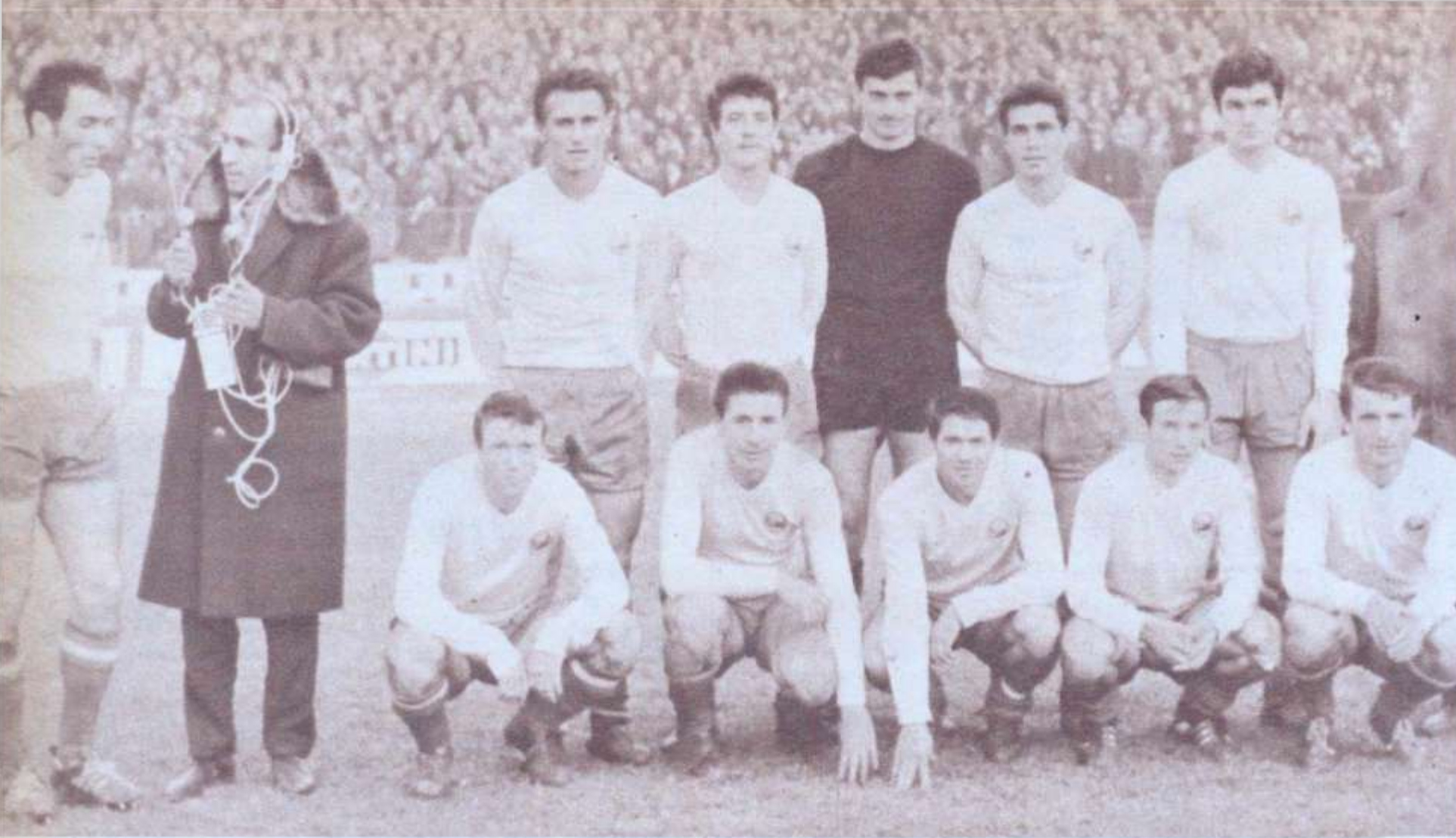
Haidu in 1967 (back row, center) with Romania before their friendly match against West Germany, which Romania won 1–0 in Bucharest

Haidu played five games for Romania, making his debut on 2 May 1965 under coach Ilie Oană in a 3–0 home victory against Turkey in the 1966 World Cup qualifiers. His following two matches were also in the World Cup qualifiers, keeping a clean sheet in a 1–0 win over Czechoslovakia, then conceding his only two goals while playing for the national team from Eusébio in a 2–1 loss to Portugal. His last appearance for The Tricolours took place on 22 November 1967 in a 1–0 home win against West Germany.

== Personal life and death ==
After he retired from football, he had a period when he suffered from poverty. Haidu died in April 2023 at age 80.

== Honours ==
Steaua București

- Divizia A: 1967–68
- Cupa României: 1965–66, 1966–67, 1968–69, 1969–70, 1970–71
