= Vasile Negrea =

Romanian footballer

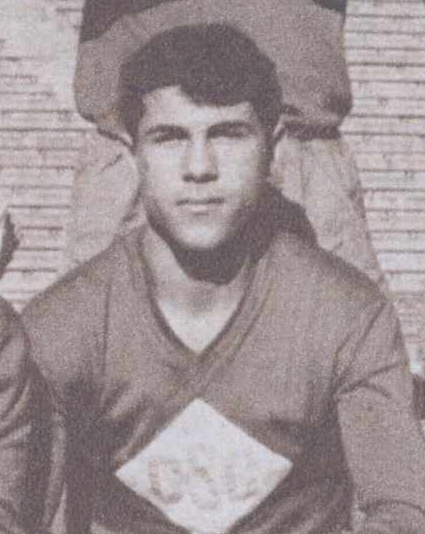

Personal information
- Date of birth: 11 February 1942 (age 84)
- Place of birth: Brăila, Romania
- Height: 1.75 m (5 ft 9 in)
- Position: Left midfielder

Senior career*
Years	Team	Apps	(Gls)
1963–1964	Siderurgistul Galați	11	(3)
1964–1973	Steaua București	189	(7)
1973–1974	Metalul București	22	(1)
Total		222	(11)

International career
1967	Romania B	1	(0)
- * Club domestic league appearances and goals

Vasile Negrea (born 11 February 1942) is a Romanian former football left midfielder.

== Honours ==
Steaua București

- Divizia A: 1967–68
- Cupa României: 1965–66, 1966–67, 1968–69, 1969–70, 1970–71
