= Florea Voinea =

Romanian footballer

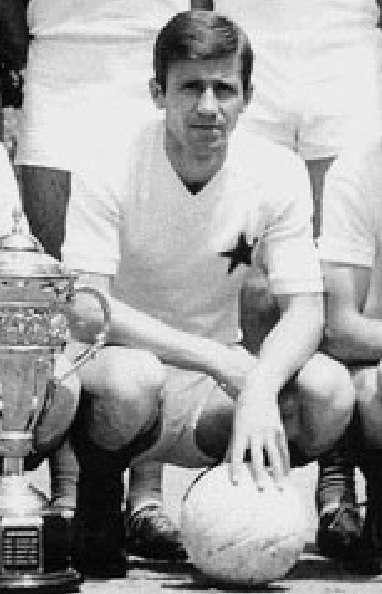
- Voinea with Steaua București in 1967

Personal information
- Date of birth: 21 April 1941 (age 85)
- Place of birth: Puchenii Moșneni, Prahova County, Romania
- Height: 1.77 m (5 ft 10 in)
- Position: Striker

Youth career
- 1956: Rafinăria 1 Ploiești
- 1956–1959: Petrolul Ploiești

Senior career*
Years	Team	Apps	(Gls)
1959–1960	Prahova Ploiești		
1960–1961	Petrolul Ploiești	5	(2)
1961–1970	Steaua București	182	(103)
1970–1972	Nîmes	50	(18)
1972–1973	Steaua București	15	(3)
1973–1974	CSM Reșița	27	(6)
1974–1975	Politehnica Timișoara	21	(2)
1975–1976	UM Timișoara		
Total		300	(134)

International career
1962	Romania U18		
1962–1965	Romania U23	12	(4)
1963–1965	Romania B	2	(3)
1963	Romania Olympic	1	(0)
1967	Romania	1	(0)
Medal record
Men's football
Representing Romania
UEFA European Under-18 Championship
Winner	1962 Romania
- * Club domestic league appearances and goals

Florea Voinea (born 21 April 1941) is a Romanian former professional footballer who played as a striker.

== Club career ==
=== Early career ===
Voinea was born on 21 April 1941 in Puchenii Moșneni, Prahova County, Romania and began playing junior-level football in 1956 at Rafinăria 1 Ploiești and then for Petrolul Ploiești. He started to play at senior level in 1959 at Divizia B club Prahova Ploiești. After two seasons, Voinea returned to Petrolul, where he made his Divizia A debut on 20 August 1961 under coach Ilie Oană in a 6–2 away victory against CCA București in which he scored a goal.

=== Steaua București ===
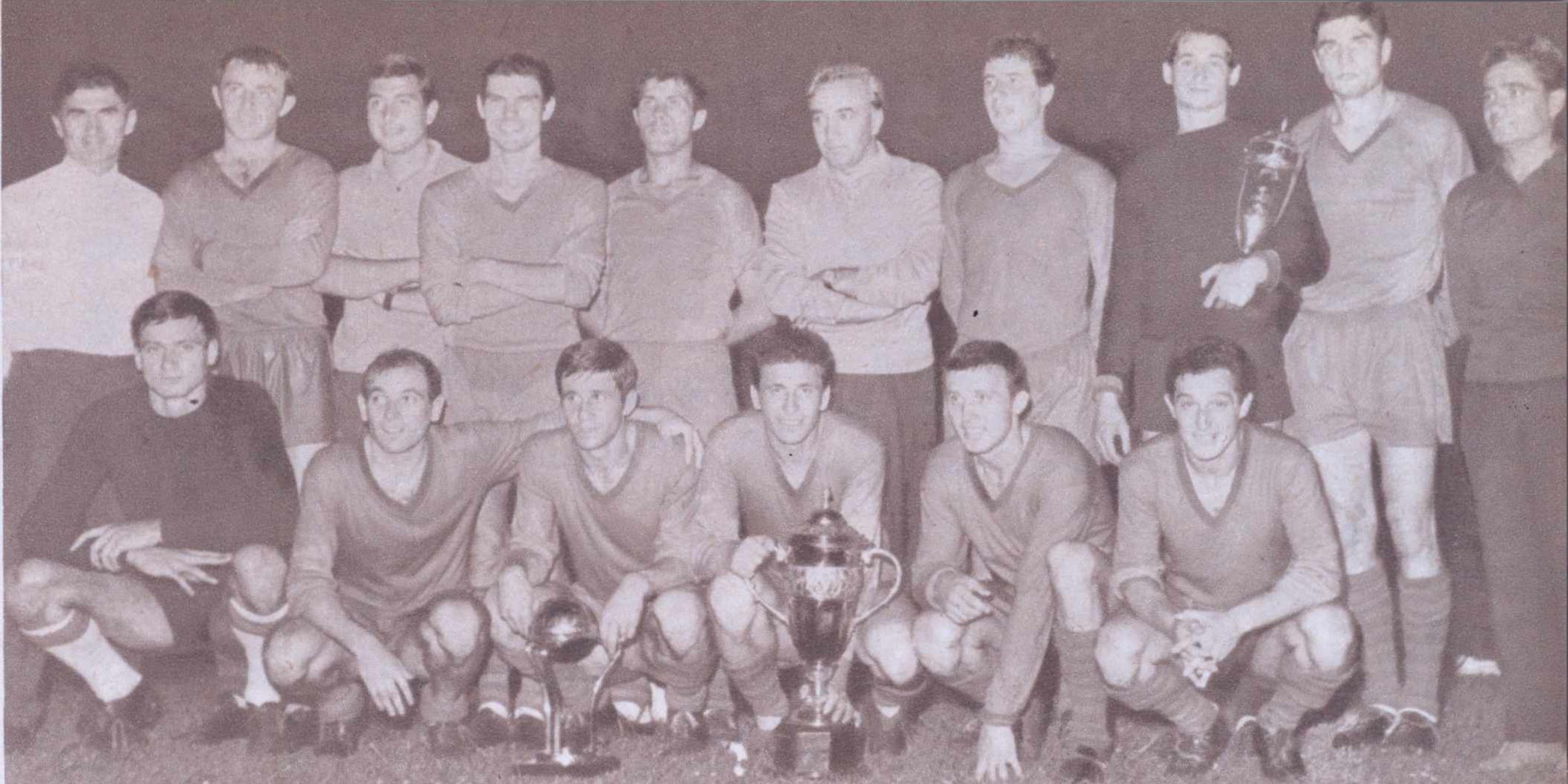
Florea (bottom row, third from the left) with Steaua after winning the Cupa României final in 1966.

In 1961, Voinea joined Steaua București where he won the 1967–68 title, as the team's top-scorer with 13 goals in 25 matches under coach Ștefan Kovács. He also won five Cupa României, scoring in all finals, including doubles in the last two, both 2–1 victories against rivals Dinamo București. He is Steaua's top-scorer in the derby against Dinamo with 13 goals in all competitions. During these years, Voinea represented The Military Men in 14 European competition matches, scoring two goals.

=== Nîmes ===
During Romania's communist era, transfers of Romanian footballers outside the country were rarely allowed. However, in June 1970, dictator Nicolae Ceaușescu visited France, where he was invited by president Georges Pompidou. Pompidou took him to Nîmes, a town where communists consistently won elections. There, Ceaușescu spoke with the mayor, who complained about the poor results of the local football team, Nîmes Olympique. Consequently, Ceaușescu promised to send two Romanian footballers to the club. Subsequently, some French officials were dispatched to observe the 1970 Cupa României final, which Steaua București won 2–1 against Dinamo București. From this match, they selected Voinea from Steaua and Ion Pârcălab from Dinamo to play for Nîmes.

Voinea made his French Division 1 debut on 19 September 1970 under coach Kader Firoud in a 2–0 home victory against Bastia. He scored his first goals on 3 October, netting a hat-trick in a 4–3 win over Sochaux. In the following season he scored a brace in a 5–1 home victory against AS Monaco and a hat-trick in a 5–1 away win over Red Star. Voinea and compatriot Pârcălab finished the 1971–72 season with each scoring 11 goals, which helped the team finish second in the championship. He made his last French Division 1 appearance on 27 May 1972 in a 4–0 success over Saint-Étienne, totaling 50 matches with 18 goals in the competition. Voinea also played for Nîmes in two UEFA Cup matches.

=== Late career ===
After spending two years in France, Voinea came back to Romania, and had a second spell at Steaua București. In 1973 he went to CSM Reșița for one season. Subsequently, he joined Politehnica Timișoara where he made his last Divizia A appearance on 25 May 1975 in a 2–2 draw against Steagul Roșu Brașov, totaling 251 matches with 117 goals in the competition and 40 goals scored in the Cupa României. Voinea ended his career in 1976, after playing one season in Divizia B for UM Timișoara.

== International career ==
Voinea was a member of Romania's under-18 national team which won the 1962 European Championship under coaches Nicolae Dumitrescu and Gheorghe Ola. He was the nation's top-scorer in the tournament with four goals, including one in the 4–1 victory against Yugoslavia in the final. Between 1962 and 1965, he made several appearances for Romania's under-23 and B sides. He also played for the Olympic team in a 2–1 victory against Denmark in the 1964 Summer Olympics qualifiers.

Voinea played one friendly game for Romania, appearing on 29 October 1967 under coach Constantin Teașcă in a 0–0 draw against Poland.

For winning the 1962 European Under-18 Championship, Voinea was decorated by President of Romania, Traian Băsescu on 25 March 2008, with the Ordinul "Meritul Sportiv" – (The Medal of "Sportive Merit") Class III.

== Honours ==
Steaua București

- Divizia A: 1967–68
- Cupa României: 1961–62, 1965–66, 1966–67, 1968–69, 1969–70

Nîmes

- French Division 1 runner-up: 1971–72
- Coppa delle Alpi: 1972

Romania U18

- UEFA European Under-18 Championship: 1962
