= 1961–62 Cupa României =

Tournament details
- Country: Romania

Final positions
- Champions: Steaua București
- Runners-up: Rapid București

The 1961–62 Cupa României was the 24th edition of Romania's most prestigious football cup competition.

The title was won by Steaua București against Rapid București.

== Format ==
The competition is an annual knockout tournament.

In the first round proper, two pots were made, first pot with Divizia A teams and other teams till 16 and the second pot with the rest of teams qualified in this phase. Each tie is played as a single leg.

First round proper matches are played on the ground of the lowest ranked team, then from the second round proper the matches are played on a neutral location.

If a match is drawn after 90 minutes, the game goes in extra time, and if the scored is still tight after 120 minutes, then a replay will be played. In case the game is still tight after the replay, then the team from lower division will qualify for the next round.

From the first edition, the teams from Divizia A entered in competition in sixteen finals, rule which remained till today.

== First round proper ==
Team 1	Score	Team 2
6 May 1962
Vagonul Arad (Div. B)	0–2	(Div. A) Jiul Petrila
CSM Baia Mare (Div. B)	4–2	(Div. A) Ştiinţa Cluj
Olimpia București (Div. B)	1–2	(Div. A) Metalul Târgovişte
Farul Constanța (Div. B)	1–0	(Div. A) Dinamo Piteşti
Dinamo Galaţi (Div. B)	1–4	(Div. A) Progresul București
Chimia Govora (Div. B)	2–1	(Div. A) Minerul Lupeni
Corvinul Hunedoara (Div. B)	1–3 (a.e.t.)	(Div. A) Ştiinţa Timişoara
CSMS Iaşi (Div. B)	1–2 (a.e.t.)	(Div. A) Dinamo Bacău
ASA Crișul Oradea (Div. B)	1–2	(Div. A) Steagul Roșu Brașov
Metalul Pitești (Div. C)	0–1	(Div. B) Prahova Ploiești
CSM Reșița (Div. B)	1–2	(Div. A) UTA Arad
Laminorul Roman (Div. C)	1–0	(Div. B) Rapid Focşani
CFR Roşiori (Div. B)	1–3	(Div. A) Petrolul Ploiești
Rapid Târgu Mureş (Div. B)	0–1	(Div. A) Dinamo București
20 May 1962
CSM Mediaş (Div. B)	0–3	(Div. A) Rapid București
Arieșul Turda (Div. B)	0–2	(Div. A) Steaua București

== Second round proper ==
Team 1	Score	Team 2
20 May 1962
Dinamo Bacău	4–1	UTA Arad
Metalul Târgovişte	4–3	Farul Constanța
Petrolul Ploiești	2–1 (a.e.t.)	Dinamo București
Steagul Roşu Braşov	2–0	Prahova Ploiești
Jiul Petrila	3–1	CSM Baia Mare
Progresul București	1–0	Ştiinţa Timişoara
24 May 1962
Rapid București	10–0	Laminorul Roman
Steaua București	3–1	Chimia Govora

== Quarter-finals ==
Team 1	Score	Team 2
17 June 1962
Rapid București	3–0	Metalul Târgovişte
Steaua București	3–1 (a.e.t.)	Dinamo Bacău
Progresul București	3–2	Petrolul Ploiești
Steagul Roşu Braşov	4–4 (a.e.t.)	Jiul Petrila
18 June 1962 — Replay
Steagul Roşu Braşov	4–1	Jiul Petrila

== Semi-finals ==
Team 1	Score	Team 2
27 June 1962
Rapid București	4–0	Progresul București
Steaua București	7–1	Steagul Roşu Braşov

== Final ==
8 July 1962
17:30 EET

Steaua București	5–1	Rapid București
Mateianu 11'; Voinea 40'; Constantin 47', 64'; Raksi 85'	Report	Ozon 15'

23 August, Bucharest
Attendance: 70,000
Referee: Alexandru Tóth (Oradea)
