= 1966–67 Cupa României =

Tournament details
- Country: Romania

Final positions
- Champions: Steaua București
- Runners-up: Foresta Fălticeni

The 1966–67 Cupa României was the 29th edition of Romania's most prestigious football cup competition.

The title was won by Steaua București against Foresta Fălticeni.

== Format ==
The competition is an annual knockout tournament.

In the first round proper, two pots were made, first pot with Divizia A teams and other teams till 16 and the second pot with the rest of teams qualified in this phase. Each tie is played as a single leg.

First round proper matches are played on the ground of the lowest ranked team, then from the second round proper the matches are played on a neutral location.

In the first round proper, if a match is drawn after 90 minutes, the game goes in extra time, and if the scored is still tight after 120 minutes, the team who played away will qualify.

From the second round proper, if a match is drawn after 90 minutes, the game goes in extra time, and if the scored is still tight after 120 minutes, then the younger team (the lower average of players age) will qualify.

From the first edition, the teams from Divizia A entered in competition in sixteen finals, rule which remained till today.

== First round proper ==
The matches were played on 5 and 29 March 1967.

Team 1	Score	Team 2
5 March 1967
Gloria Bârlad (Div. C)	0–1	(Div. A) Steaua București
Progresul Brăila (Div. B)	0–1	(Div. A) Rapid București
Medicina Cluj (Div. C)	3–1	(Div. A) Jiul Petroşani
Electroputere Craiova (Div. C)	0–1 (a.e.t.)	(Div. A) Universitatea Craiova
Foresta Fălticeni (Div. C)	1–0	(Div. A) Steagul Roşu Braşov
Oţelul Galaţi (Div. B)	2–3 (a.e.t.)	(Div. A) Politehnica Timişoara
Metalul Hunedoara (Div. C)	1–3	(Div. A) UTA Arad
Minerul Lupeni (Div. B)	1–0 (a.e.t.)	(Div. B) Metalurgistul București
Textila Mediaş (Div. D)	2–4	(Div. A) Progresul București
ASA Crişul Oradea (Div. B)	1–0	(Div. B) Politehnica București
Metalul Plopeni (Div. D)	1–1 (a.e.t.)	(Div. A) CSMS Iaşi
Voinţa Reghin (Div. C)	0–2	(Div. A) Dinamo București
CSM Sibiu (Div. B)	0–0 (a.e.t.)	(Div. A) Farul Constanța
Chimia Suceava (Div. B)	2–1 (a.e.t.)	(Div. A) Universitatea Cluj
CFR Timişoara (Div. B)	2–0	(Div. A) Dinamo Piteşti
29 March 1967
Minerul Baia Mare (Div. B)	4–0	(Div. A) Petrolul Ploiești

== Second round proper ==
Team 1	Score	Team 2
5 April 1967
Minerul Baia Mare	1–0	Chimia Suceava
Steaua București	1–0	Medicina Cluj
Progresul București	1–0	Dinamo București
Farul Constanța	2–1	ASA Crişul Oradea
CSMS Iaşi	2–0	Universitatea Craiova
Rapid București	6–0	Minerul Lupeni
Foresta Fălticeni	0–0 (a.e.t.)	Politehnica Timişoara
CFR Timişoara	1–0	UTA Arad

== Quarter-finals ==
Team 1	Score	Team 2
3 May 1967
Steaua București	3–0	Farul Constanța
CFR Timişoara	1–1 (a.e.t.)	Progresul București
Foresta Fălticeni	1–1 (a.e.t.)	CSMS Iaşi
Rapid București	3–0	Minerul Baia Mare

== Semi-finals ==
Team 1	Score	Team 2
28 June 1967
Foresta Fălticeni	1–0	Rapid București
Steaua București	3–0	CFR Timişoara

== Final ==
2 July 1967
17:30 EET

Steaua București	6–0	Foresta Fălticeni
Şoo 8', 16'; Negrea 10'; Voinea 38'; Avram 62'; Popescu 71'	Report

Republicii, Bucharest
Attendance: 20,000
Referee: Iosif Ritter (Timișoara)
