= Ștefan Kovács =

Hungarian football manager (1920–1995)

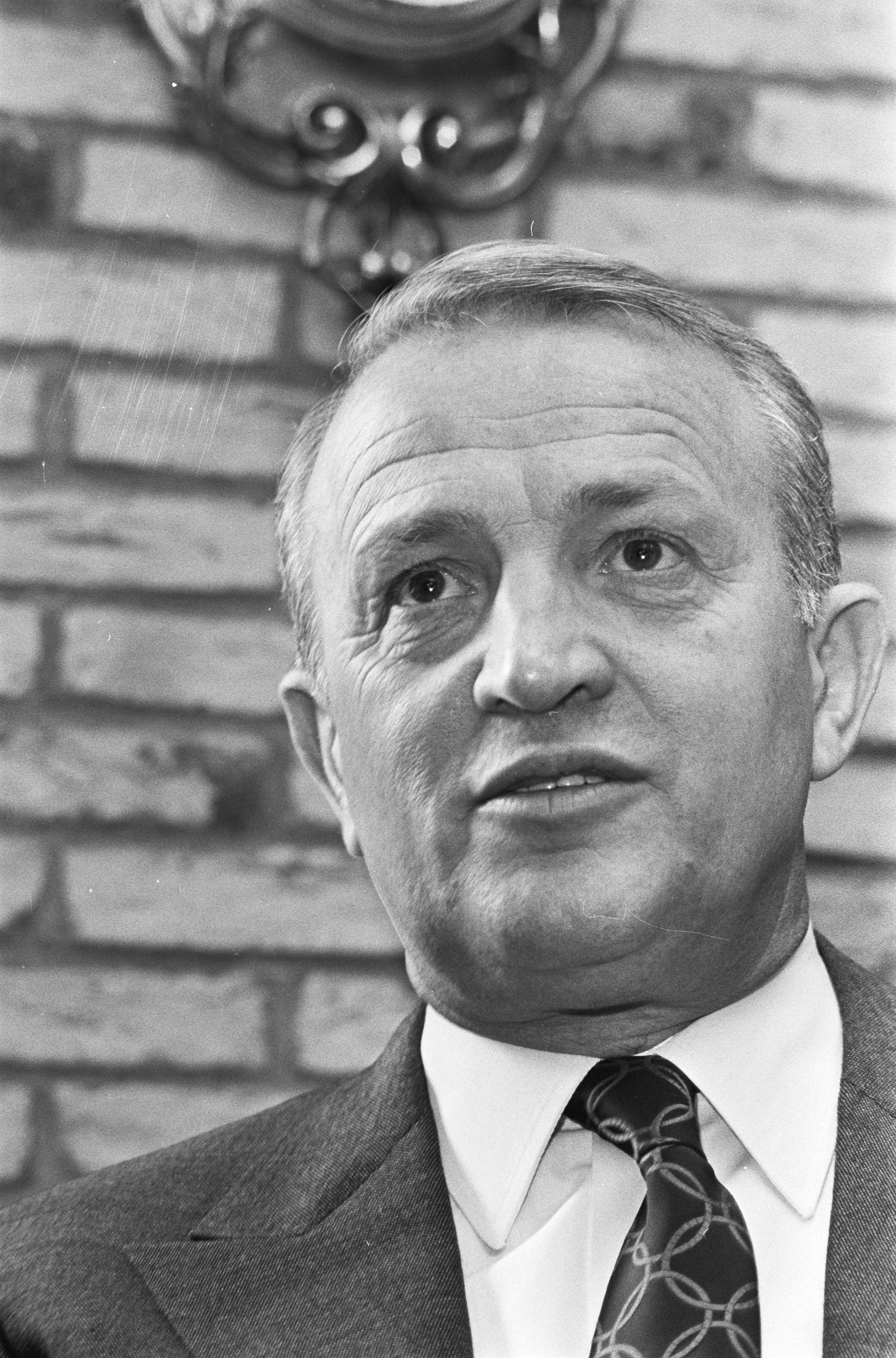
- Kovács in 1971

Personal information
- Date of birth: 2 October 1920
- Place of birth: Timișoara, Romania
- Date of death: 12 May 1995 (aged 74)
- Place of death: Cluj-Napoca, Romania
- Height: 1.72 m (5 ft 8 in)
- Position: Midfielder

Youth career
- 1931–1934: CA Timișoara
- 1934–1937: CA Oradea

Senior career*
Years	Team	Apps	(Gls)
1937–1938	CA Oradea	9	(0)
1938–1941	R. Olympic CC	19	(4)
1941	Ripensia Timișoara		
1941–1942	CFR Turnu Severin		
1942–1947	Kolozsvári AC / Ferar Cluj	93	(8)
1947–1950	CFR Cluj	52 (Note: The statistics for the 1950 Divizia B season are unavailable.)	(5)
1950–1953	Universitatea Cluj	31	(6)
Total		204	(23)

Managerial career
- 1952–1953: Universitatea Cluj (player/coach)
- 1954–1955: Universitatea Cluj
- 1956: Universitatea Cluj
- 1957–1958: Universitatea Cluj
- 1959–1960: Dermata Cluj
- 1960–1962: CFR Cluj
- 1962–1967: Romania (assistant)
- 1967–1970: Steaua București
- 1971–1973: Ajax
- 1973–1975: France
- 1976–1979: Romania
- 1980: Romania
- 1982–1983: Panathinaikos
- 1986–1987: Monaco
- * Club domestic league appearances and goals

Ștefan Kovács (Romanian: Ștefan Covaci; Hungarian: Kovács István; 2 October 1920 – 12 May 1995) was a Romanian football player and coach. Having won two European Cup titles, he is one of the most successful coaches in the history of the game. Various football magazines listed him among their best coaches: in 2013, World Soccer placed him 36th; in 2019, France Football ranked him 43rd; and in 2023, FourFourTwo positioned him 62nd.

== Playing career ==
Kovács was born into an ethnic Hungarian family on 2 October 1920 in Timișoara, Romania. He started to play football in 1931, aged 11 at local club CA Timișoara. Three years later he went to play for CA Oradea where he was teammates with his brother, Nicolae Kovács. Starting from 1938 until 1941, he had his only spell abroad, playing for Belgium's Olympique Charleroi. Afterwards he came back to his hometown at Ripensia, but only for a short while because he then went to CFR Turnu Severin.

In 1942 he went to play in the Nemzeti Bajnokság I for Kolozsvári AC, making 68 appearances with seven goals in the competition. Following the Second World War when the northern part of Transylvania went back to Romania he played with the club, renamed Ferar, in Divizia A. In the 1947–48 season, Ferar merged with CFR Cluj, Kovács playing for the new club, including in Divizia B where the team was relegated at the end of the 1948–49 season. He came back to Divizia A football in 1951 when he joined Universitatea Cluj where he made his last appearance in the Romanian first league on 27 September 1953 in a 2–0 away loss to Locomotiva Timișoara, totaling 108 appearances with 12 goals in the competition.

== Managerial career ==
=== Universitatea Cluj ===
Kovács started coaching in 1952 at Universitatea Cluj while also being an active player, helping the club finish the season in fifth place. He led the club once again in the 1954 season when "U" finished again in fifth place, leaving the club in the middle of the following season as he was replaced with Petre Rădulescu. Kovács returned to the club for a third time in the first half of the 1956 season, but was replaced with Nicolae Munteanu for the second half, and the team was relegated to the second league at the end of it. His fourth and final spell at Universitatea took place in the 1957–58 Divizia B season in which the team finished in first place, promoting back to the first league.

=== Dermata Cluj, CFR Cluj and Romania assistant ===
In 1959 he went for one year at Dermata Cluj in Divizia B, then for the following two seasons he worked at CFR Cluj in the same league. In 1962 he became the assistant of Silviu Ploeșteanu at Romania's national team, afterwards being the assistant of Ilie Oană, leaving together after a 7–1 loss on May 1967 to Switzerland in the Euro 1968 qualifiers.

=== Steaua București ===
Kovács had his first major coaching success at the helm of Steaua București, where between 1967 and 1970 he won the 1967–68 Divizia A title and two consecutive Cupa României trophies, both of them after 2–1 wins in the finals over rivals Dinamo București. He has a total of 194 matches as a manager in the Romanian top-division, Divizia A, consisting of 83 victories, 50 draws and 61 losses.

=== Ajax ===
He succeeded Rinus Michels as the head of Ajax in 1971, continuing and expanding on his "total football" philosophy. At the beginning, the team's stars were sceptical of Kovács leading them. Johan Cruyff, intending to hit Kovács, shot a ball towards him while he was talking to an assistant, but Kovács saw the gesture, made an impeccable stop, and returned the ball to Cruyff, telling him: "Use the inside more when shooting".

In his first season, he secured the league title and the KNVB Cup with a 3–2 victory over FC Den Haag in the final. He also triumphed in the 1971–72 European Cup, overcoming Dynamo Dresden, Marseille, Arsenal and Benfica, then defeating with 2–0 Inter Milan in the final, courtesy of a brace from Johan Cruyff. He began his second season by winning the Intercontinental Cup with a 4–1 aggregate victory over Independiente, followed by the European Super Cup after a 6–3 aggregate win against Rangers. He concluded the season by claiming another championship title and once again the European Cup this time progressing past CSKA Sofia, Bayern Munich, and Real Madrid in the campaign, and ultimately winning the final against Juventus after Johnny Rep scored the only goal of the match. At his last game as coach of the Sons of the Gods, the players gave him a Ford Taunus as a gift because he always came to training by riding a bicycle.

During his spell at Ajax he was known for promoting a more relaxed environment in the team, Johan Cruyff saying:"Ștefan Kovács was a very pleasant coach, but much less strict than Michels when it came to discipline. Kovács let us be ourselves, he was one of us."

=== France ===
After he left Ajax in 1973, he was called up by the French Football Federation to take the reins of the national side. In this position he raised the young generations of French talents, giving debuts to 33 players, including Dominique Rocheteau, Bernard Lacombe and Alain Giresse. His first game was a 3–1 home win in a friendly against Greece. He led the team in the Euro 1976 qualifiers, failing to qualify, as Belgium and East Germany secured the top two positions. Kovács's tenure with The Blues comprised 15 games, resulting in six wins, four draws, and five losses. Michel Hidalgo, his assistant and successor, took advantage of this work and continued to lead the team of France to its victory at Euro 1984.

=== Romania ===
In 1976, Kovács became head coach of Romania, making his debut on 12 May in a 1–0 loss to Bulgaria in the 1973–76 Balkan Cup final. He led the team in the World Cup 1978 qualifiers, securing victories in the first two games against Spain and Yugoslavia, but ultimately failed to qualify for the final tournament after losing the second leg against both opponents, thus finishing second in the group behind the Spaniards. He then guided the national team in three games in the Euro 1980 qualifiers, being replaced in late 1979 by his assistant Constantin Cernăianu but remaining as the technical director of the squad. He returned to the national team in 1980, his last game for The Tricolours taking place on 27 August in a 4–1 win over Yugoslavia in the 1977–80 Balkan Cup final, having a total of 32 games from both of his spells with Romania, consisting of 11 victories, 8 draws and 13 losses. During these years he also worked as the vice-president of the Romanian Football Federation.

=== Panathinaikos and Monaco ===
In 1981 went to work for two seasons at Greek side Panathinaikos, bringing compatriot Doru Nicolae to the team, managing to win the 1981–82 Greek Cup after a 1–0 victory over AEL in the final. His last coaching experience took place in the 1986–87 French Division 1 season at Monaco, managing to finish in fifth place.

== Writing ==
He wrote one volume about football:

- Kovács, Ștefan (1975). Football Total. Calmann-Lévy – Paris. ISBN 2-7021-0019-8.

== Personal life ==
When talking about his ethnic origins, Kovács said he was "Romanian by mother, Hungarian by father, Jewish by grandparents and a little Serbian by great-grandparents". His older brother Nicolae Kovács was one of the few players who participated at all the first three World Cups. Kovács was multilingual, speaking five languages: Romanian, Hungarian, English, French and German.

== Death ==
Kovács died on 12 May 1995 in Cluj-Napoca at age 74, twelve days before Ajax won their fourth European Cup.

In his native Timișoara, a street is named after him.

== Managerial statistics ==
As of 12 May 2026

Managerial record by team and tenure
Team	Nat.	From	To	Record								Ref
Team	Nat.	From	To	G	W	D	L	GF	GA	GD	Win %	Ref
Panathinaikos	(Greece)	6 July 1981	8 March 1983	67	36	16	15	103	57	+46	53.73	
AS Monaco	(France)	1 June 1986	30 June 1987	43	19	15	9	53	37	+16	44.19	
Career total				110	55	31	24	156	94	+62	50.00	—

== Honours ==
=== Manager ===
Universitatea Cluj

- Divizia B: 1957–58

Steaua București

- Divizia A: 1967–68
- Cupa României: 1968–69, 1969–70

Ajax

- Eredivisie: 1971–72, 1972–73
- KNVB Cup: 1971–72
- European Cup: 1971–72, 1972–73
- European Super Cup: 1972
- Intercontinental Cup: 1972

Romania

- Balkan Cup: 1977–80

Panathinaikos

- Greek Cup: 1981–82

Individual

- World Soccer 36th Greatest Manager of All Time: 2013
- France Football 43rd Greatest Manager of All Time: 2019
- FourFourTwo 62nd Greatest Manager of All Time: 2023
