= 1968–69 Cupa României =

Tournament details
- Country: Romania

Final positions
- Champions: Steaua București
- Runners-up: Dinamo București

The 1968–69 Cupa României was the 31st edition of Romania's most prestigious football cup competition.

The title was won by Steaua București against Dinamo București.

== Format ==
The competition is an annual knockout tournament.

In the first round proper, two pots were made, first pot with Divizia A teams and other teams till 16 and the second pot with the rest of teams qualified in this phase. Each tie is played as a single leg.

First round proper matches are played on the ground of the lowest ranked team, then from the second round proper the matches are played on a neutral location.

In the first round proper, if a match is drawn after 90 minutes, the game goes in extra time, and if the scored is still tight after 120 minutes, the team who played away will qualify.

From the second round proper, if a match is drawn after 90 minutes, the game goes in extra time, and if the scored is still tight after 120 minutes, then the team from the lower division will qualify. If the teams are from the same division a replay will be played.

In the semi-finals, each tie is played as a two legs.

From the first edition, the teams from Divizia A entered in competition in sixteen finals, rule which remained till today.

== First round proper ==
Team 1	Score	Team 2
4 March 1969
Oțelul Galați (Div. B)	0–1	(Div. A) Progresul București
5 March 1969
Minerul Anina (Div. C)	3–1	(Div. A) Politehnica Iași
Minerul Baia Mare (Div. B)	1–2 (a.e.t.)	(Div. A) Universitatea Cluj
Steagul Roşu Braşov (Div. B)	2–1 (a.e.t.)	(Div. A) Petrolul Ploiești
Metalul București (Div. B)	2–1	(Div. A) Dinamo Bacău
Arieşul Câmpia Turzii (Div. C)	2–4	(Div. A) Steaua București
Politehnica Galaţi (Div. B)	2–1 (a.e.t.)	(Div. A) Vagonul Arad
Dunărea Giurgiu (Div. B)	2–2 (a.e.t.)	(Div. A) Rapid București
Metalul Hunedoara (Div. B)	1–2 (a.e.t.)	(Div. A) ASA Crişul Oradea
Soda Ocna Mureş (Div. C)	0–2	(Div. A) UTA Arad
Ceahlăul Piatra Neamț (Div. B)	0–4	(Div. A) Dinamo București
CSM Reșița (Div. B)	0–2	(Div. A) Argeș Pitești
Chimia Râmnicu Vâlcea (Div. B)	1–3	(Div. A) Farul Constanța
Muncitorul Schela Mare (Div. D)	0–1	(Div. A) Jiul Petroşani
Chimia Suceava (Div. B)	4–3 (a.e.t.)	(Div. A) Universitatea Craiova
Chimica Târnăveni (Div. C)	2–3 (a.e.t.)	(Div. A) ASA 1962 Târgu Mureș

== Second round proper ==
Team 1	Score	Team 2
12 March 1969
UTA Arad	5–1 (a.e.t.)	Metalul București
ASA 1962 Târgu Mureș	0–0 (a.e.t.)	Chimia Suceava
Farul Constanța	3–1	ASA Crişul Oradea
Steaua București	2–1	Minerul Anina
Progresul București	1–0	Politehnica Galaţi
Rapid București	2–0	Jiul Petroşani
Universitatea Cluj	3–0	Steagul Roşu Braşov
Dinamo București	1–0	Argeș Pitești

== Quarter-finals ==
Team 1	Score	Team 2
21 May 1969
Dinamo București	3–0	UTA Arad
Farul Constanța	3–0	Progresul București
Steaua București	3–1 (a.e.t.)	Rapid București
Chimia Suceava	2–1	Universitatea Cluj

== Semi-finals ==
The matches were played on 28 May and 4 June 1969.

Team 1	Agg.	Team 2	1st leg	2nd leg
Dinamo București	8–2	Chimia Suceava	5–1	3–1
Farul Constanța	5–7	Steaua București	3–2	2–5

== Final ==
22 June 1969
17:30 EET

Steaua București	2–1	Dinamo București
Voinea 43', 75'	Report	Dumitrache 50'

23 August, Bucharest
Attendance: 45,000
Referee: Aurel Bentu (Bucharest)
