= Sakač =

Sakač and Sakáč are Slavic surnames, Sakač being Croatian, while Sakáč is a Slovak surname. The surname could originate from Hungarian occupational surname Szakács meaning "cook".

Croatian Sakač has most bearers in Varaždin and its surroundings (Kapela Kalnička, Ljubelj Kalnički, Varaždinske Toplice). It is mentioned in the first address book of the City of Zagreb (Prvi adresar grada Zagreba) in 1902.

Variants of the surname inlude: Sakach, Sakaci, Sakac, Szakacs, Sakacs, Szakach, Sakhach, Sakachi, Sakacha and Sackac.

Notable people with the surname include:

- Branimir Sakač (1918–1979), Croatian composer
- Marcel Sakáč, Slovak ice hockey player
- Stjepan Krizin Sakač (1890–1973), Croatian historian
