= Brendan Morrison =

Canadian ice hockey player (born 1975)

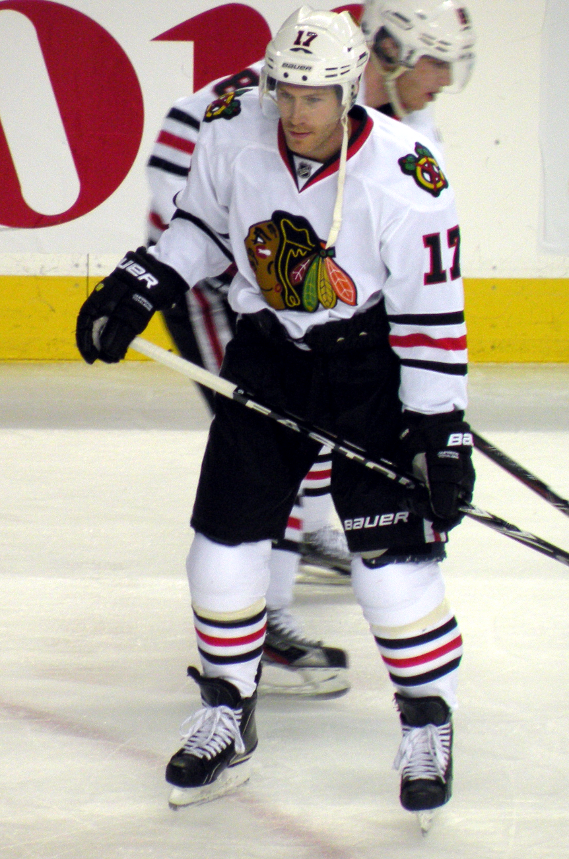
- Morrison with the Chicago Blackhawks in 2012
- Born: August 15, 1975 (age 51) Pitt Meadows, British Columbia, Canada
- Height: 5 ft 11 in (180 cm)
- Weight: 185 lb (84 kg; 13 st 3 lb)
- Position: Centre
- Shot: Left
- Played for: New Jersey Devils; HC IPB Pojišťovna Pardubice; Vancouver Canucks; Linköpings HC; Anaheim Ducks; Dallas Stars; Washington Capitals; Calgary Flames; Chicago Blackhawks
- National team: Canada
- NHL draft: 39th overall, 1993; New Jersey Devils
- Playing career: 1997–2012

Brendan Morrison (born August 15, 1975) is a Canadian former professional ice hockey player. A centre, he played in the National Hockey League (NHL) for the New Jersey Devils, Vancouver Canucks, Anaheim Ducks, Dallas Stars, Washington Capitals, Calgary Flames and Chicago Blackhawks.

Morrison was selected 39th overall in the 1993 NHL entry draft by the Devils after a season in the British Columbia Junior Hockey League (BCJHL); he had won rookie of the year honours for the Interior Conference as a member of the Penticton Panthers. Following his draft, he joined the college ice hockey ranks with the Michigan Wolverines of the Central Collegiate Hockey Association (CCHA). During his four-year collegiate career, he was named the NCAA Tournament Most Outstanding Player while leading the Wolverines to a national championship in 1996 and won the Hobey Baker Award as the NCAA's player of the year in 1997.

Turning professional in 1997–98, Morrison was named to the American Hockey League (AHL) All-Rookie Team as a member of the Albany River Rats. He played his rookie season in the NHL the following season with the New Jersey Devils before being traded to the Vancouver Canucks in March 2000. He played seven full seasons with the Canucks, which included a club-record 534 consecutive regular season games played. As a member of the team's "West Coast Express" line (alongside Markus Näslund and Todd Bertuzzi), Morrison enjoyed the most successful years of his career, posting three consecutive 60-point seasons. During the 2004–05 NHL lockout, he played one season with Linköpings HC of the Swedish Elite League. Beginning in 2008, he played stints with the Anaheim Ducks, Dallas Stars and Washington Capitals before joining the Calgary Flames in 2010.

Internationally, Morrison has competed for Canada in three World Championships, winning gold in 2004 and silver in 2005.

== Playing career ==
=== Amateur career (1992–97) ===
Morrison played one season with the Penticton Panthers of the British Columbia Junior Hockey League (BCJHL) in 1992–93, recording 94 points (35 goals and 59 assists) over 56 games. He ranked second in team scoring, behind Marcel Sakáč, and was awarded the Bruce Allison Memorial Trophy as the Interior Conference's rookie of the year. (Note: The trophy is awarded to one player from each of the league's two conferences. Robb Gordon of the Powell River Kings was the Coastal Conference's winner.) In the off-season, Morrison was selected by the New Jersey Devils 39th overall in the second round of the 1993 NHL entry draft.

Upon being drafted, he joined the Michigan Wolverines of the Central Collegiate Hockey Association (CCHA). He had also been approached by the Denver Pioneers and the Maine Black Bears to join their school teams, but ultimately chose Michigan. Registering 48 points (20 goals and 28 assists) over 38 games as a freshman, Morrison was named the CCHA Rookie of the Year for the 1993–94 season. He played on a line with fellow freshman Jason Botterill; the two played together throughout their college career. In the 1994 playoffs, he helped the Wolverines to a CCHA championship. Playing in his sophomore year (1994–95), Morrison improved to 76 points (23 goals and 43 assists) over 39 games and received his first of three consecutive CCHA First Team All-Star selections.

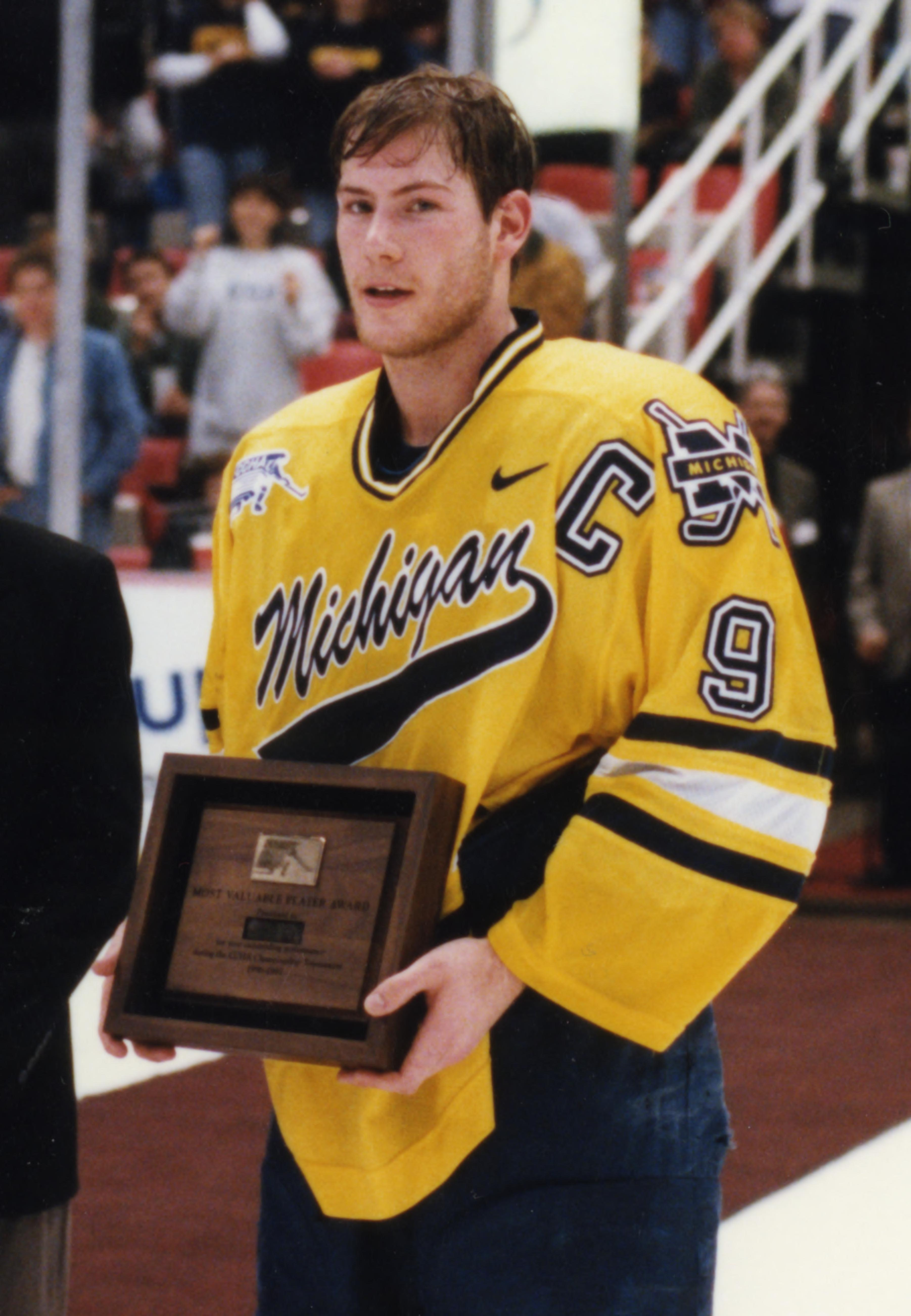
Morrison with Michigan in 1997

With 72 points over 45 games in 1995–96, Morrison received his first of back-to-back CCHA Player of the Year awards. He added 15 points in seven postseason games to capture his second CCHA championship with the Wolverines. Advancing to the 1996 NCAA Tournament, Michigan advanced to the final against the Colorado College Tigers. Morrison scored the championship-winning goal 3:35 into overtime to win the game 3–2. It was the Wolverines' first national title in 32 years. Michigan's championship-winning team that year included five future NHL players—Morrison, Botterill, Blake Sloan, John Madden, Marty Turco and Bill Muckalt. In addition to receiving NCAA Tournament MVP honours, Morrison was named to the NCAA West Regional and NCAA All-Tournament Teams.

Morrison was named team captain in his senior year. He totalled college personal bests that season of 31 goals, 57 assists and 88 points over 43 games, culminating in a Hobey Baker Award as the NCAA's most outstanding player; Morrison had been a finalist for the award the previous two years. The Wolverines repeated as CCHA champions, but lost to the Boston University Terriers in the NCAA semifinal. Morrison completed his four-year college career as the Wolverines' all-time points leader with 284, surpassing Denny Felsner. His points total also ranked seventh all-time among NCAA players.

=== New Jersey Devils (1997–2000) ===
Prior to the Devils' training camp, Morrison was signed by the team to a multi-year contract on September 9, 1997. He was seen as an unlikely candidate to secure a roster spot with the Devils; ahead of Morrison on the depth chart were numerous centres, including Doug Gilmour, Bobby Holík and Petr Sýkora. As such, he played the majority of the 1997–98 season in the American Hockey League (AHL) with the Devils' minor league affiliate, the Albany River Rats. He scored 35 goals and 84 points over 72 games in the AHL, ranking first in team scoring and eighth in the League overall. He finished second among League rookies in scoring, eight points behind Daniel Brière of the Springfield Falcons, and was named to the AHL All-Rookie Team. His AHL season included a five-goal game against the Hartford Wolfpack on April 1, 1998; two of his goals came short handed into an empty net, as part of a 5–2 Albany win. The feat was one goal shy of the AHL's single-game record.

Morrison also made his NHL debut during the 1997–98 season. He was called up to the Devils in December 1997 as a replacement for winger John MacLean, who had been informally suspended by General Manager Lou Lamoriello after requesting to be traded. Playing in his first NHL game on December 4, 1997, Morrison scored against goaltender Tom Barrasso in a 4–0 win against the Pittsburgh Penguins. He received a second call-up in April 1998. Competing in 11 NHL games, he finished the season with five goals and four assists.

The following season, he secured a full-time roster spot with the Devils. With Doug Gilmour having left the team as a free agent in the 1998 off-season, Morrison was expected to help fill the void at centre. His 46 points (13 goals and 33 assists) over 76 games finished second among NHL rookies behind Milan Hejduk of the Colorado Avalanche. He ranked fifth in Calder Memorial Trophy voting as the League's rookie of the year with one first-place ballot (the award was given to the Avalanche's Chris Drury).

Becoming a restricted free agent in the off-season, Morrison was given a one-year qualifying offer with a reported value of approximately US$500,000. With the Devils unwilling to increase their offer, he left in September 1999 for Třebíč, Czech Republic, where fellow Devils restricted free agent Patrik Eliáš was also holding out. While overseas, Morrison and Eliáš played for Czech teams SK Horácká Slavia Třebíč and HC Pardubice as they waited for contract negotiations to resume. Morrison was pointless in two games with Třebíč and recorded seven points in five games with Pardubice. On October 24, 1999, Morrison and Eliáš agreed to new contracts with the Devils. After recording 26 points over 44 games with the Devils, Morrison was traded to the Vancouver Canucks on March 14, 2000, alongside centre Denis Pederson, in exchange for winger Alexander Mogilny. Both Morrison and Pederson were struggling offensively and were unhappy with their roles on the team.

=== Vancouver Canucks (2000–08) ===
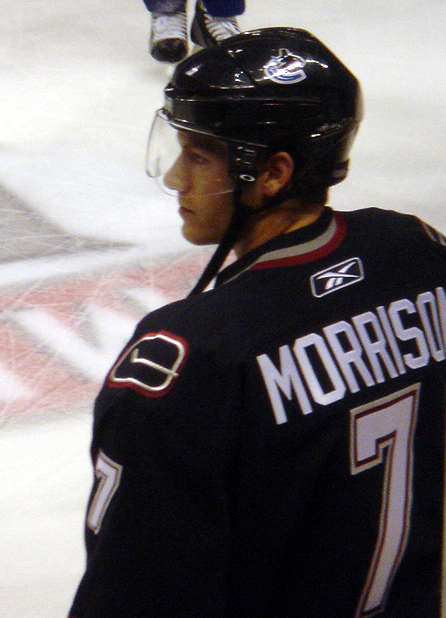
Morrison played the majority of his career with the Canucks.

Morrison finished the 1999–2000 season with nine points in 12 games with the Canucks for a combined total of 35 points in 56 games. In the off-season, he re-signed with the Canucks. Playing in his first full season with the Canucks in 2000–01, Morrison improved to 54 points (16 goals and 38 assists) over 82 games. He helped the team reach the postseason for the first time since 1996, as Vancouver secured the eighth and final seed in the Western Conference. Facing the Colorado Avalanche in the first round, the Canucks were swept in four games. Morrison scored his first NHL playoff goal during the series and finished with three points in four games.

The 2001–02 campaign marked the beginning of what was widely considered to be the most effective line combination in the NHL for several years. During a game on January 9, 2002, Morrison replaced Andrew Cassels as the centreman on the team's first line with wingers Markus Näslund and Todd Bertuzzi. He went on to record his three best statistical seasons in the NHL while playing with the two wingers. The latter two finished second and third in NHL scoring in 2001–02, while Morrison tallied 23 goals and 67 points over 82 games. Morrison's playmaking ability complemented his wingers' goal-scoring prowess. Together, they were known for playing a fast and entertaining style; as a result, head coach Marc Crawford implemented a highly-offensive coaching strategy. The trio were dubbed the "West Coast Express," named after Vancouver's commuter rail service of the same name.

Despite finishing as the NHL's top-scoring team, the Canucks entered the 2002 playoffs as the eighth seed in the West for the second consecutive season. Facing the Detroit Red Wings in the opening round, they were eliminated in six games. Morrison notched two assists during the series. After initially failing to come to terms on a new contract with the Canucks in the off-season, Morrison filed for arbitration. He won his hearing and was awarded a two-year, US$4.6 million contract on August 3, 2002, more than doubling his previous year's salary of US$775,000.

The following season, Morrison recorded career-highs with 25 goals, 46 assists, and 71 points in 82 games. He ranked 26th in NHL point-scoring, while Näslund and Bertuzzi finished second and fifth, respectively. He helped the Canucks come within a point of the Northwest Division title, entering the 2003 playoffs as the fourth seed in the West. After eliminating the St. Louis Blues in the opening round, they were defeated by the Minnesota Wild in a seven-game second round series. Morrison had a career-high four goals, seven assists and 11 points over 14 postseason games.

In 2003–04, Morrison registered 22 goals and 60 points over 82 games as all members of the Canucks' top line experienced declines in offensive production. Bertuzzi was replaced on Morrison's wing after he was suspended indefinitely by the NHL for sucker punching Steve Moore in a game against Colorado in March 2004; he was replaced on the Canucks' top line by Matt Cooke. Nonetheless, the Canucks won their first-ever Northwest Division title and went into the 2004 playoffs as the West's third seed. Facing elimination in game six of the opening round against the Calgary Flames, Morrison scored there minutes into the contest's third overtime session to force a seventh game. Having skated from the corner boards with the puck, Morrison stickhandled across the net and scored past Calgary goaltender Miikka Kiprusoff. The Canucks were then eliminated in Game 7; Morrison finished the playoff season with five points. Becoming a restricted free agent in the off-season, he filed for salary arbitration against the Canucks for the second time in two years. Both sides managed to avoid their hearing by agreeing to a one-year deal on July 27, 2004.

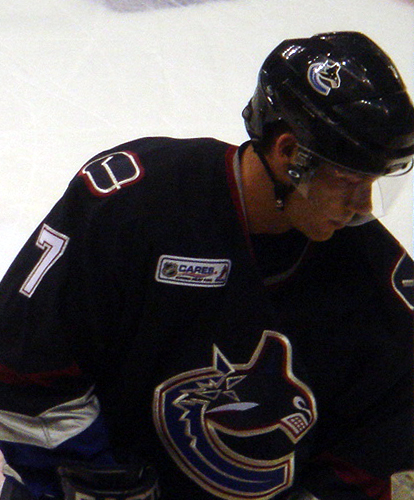
Morrison in 2005 with Vancouver

In lieu of the 2004–05 NHL lockout, Morrison went overseas to play in the Swedish Elite League, signing with Linköpings HC on September 15, 2004. With 44 points (16 goals and 29 assists) over 45 games, he ranked second in team scoring (behind Kristian Huselius) and sixth in League scoring. After finishing with the second-best regular season in the SEL, Linköping was eliminated in the first round by Södertälje SK.

With NHL play set to resume the next season, Morrison re-signed with the Canucks at US$9.6 million over three years. He suffered a torn labrum in his hip in December 2005, but chose to play through the injury. He finished the season with 19 goals and 56 points over 82 games in 2005–06, as the Canucks failed to qualify for the playoffs. Head Coach Marc Crawford recalled that by the end of the season, the line of Morrison, Bertuzzi and Näslund had been surpassed as the top unit by Daniel and Henrik Sedin. In the off-season, Morrison underwent surgery for his hip injury and missed two months of workout and conditioning while recovering. Also in the summer, Bertuzzi was traded to the Florida Panthers, marking the end of the West Coast Express line.

Morrison's hip continued to hinder his play in 2006–07, contributing to a slow start early in the season. Later in the campaign, he set a Canucks record for consecutive regular season games played (colloquially known as an "ironman streak"); he had not missed a contest since arriving to the team from New Jersey. Playing against the Los Angeles Kings on February 22, 2007, he surpassed Trevor Linden's old club record of 482 consecutive games played (his overall streak was at 491 games, including eight contests played with the Devils prior to his trade). Three days later, he became the League's active ironman when Avalanche defenceman Kārlis Skrastiņš was forced to miss a game with a knee injury. Skrastiņš had played in 495 consecutive games, while Morrison had 492 at the time. Offensively, Morrison finished the year with his sixth consecutive 50-point season in the NHL with 20 goals and 31 assists over 82 games. The Canucks returned to the postseason and advanced to the second round, where they were eliminated by the Anaheim Ducks. Morrison recorded 4 points in 12 playoff games.

Morrison began the 2007–08 season with a minor wrist injury suffered during a game during the pre-season; he chose to play through the injury for months. He extended his ironman streak to 542 games before opting for wrist surgery on December 12, 2007. The streak, which had begun on February 27, 2000, with the Devils, was the 11th longest in NHL history, 404 games short of Doug Jarvis' NHL record. Morrison was succeeded as the league's active ironman by Flames defenceman Cory Sarich, who had played in 419 consecutive games at the time of Morrison's injury. Morrison's Canucks record of 534 consecutive games played was later surpassed by Henrik Sedin on December 26, 2011 (the game in which Sedin tied the record was played between the Canucks and Morrison's Calgary Flames). After undergoing wrist surgery in December 2007, Morrison returned to the Canucks lineup in February 2008, having missed 38 games. The following month, Morrison tore the ACL in his right knee during a game on March 28, forcing him to miss the remaining four contests of the regular season. He underwent knee surgery 10 days later. Limited to 39 games due to his injuries, Morrison recorded nine goals and 25 points in 2007–08. The Canucks finished out of the playoffs for the second time in three seasons.

Becoming an unrestricted free agent in the off-season, Morrison ended his career with the Canucks ninth overall on the team's all-time scoring list with 393 points in 543 games.

=== Post-Vancouver (2008–2012) ===
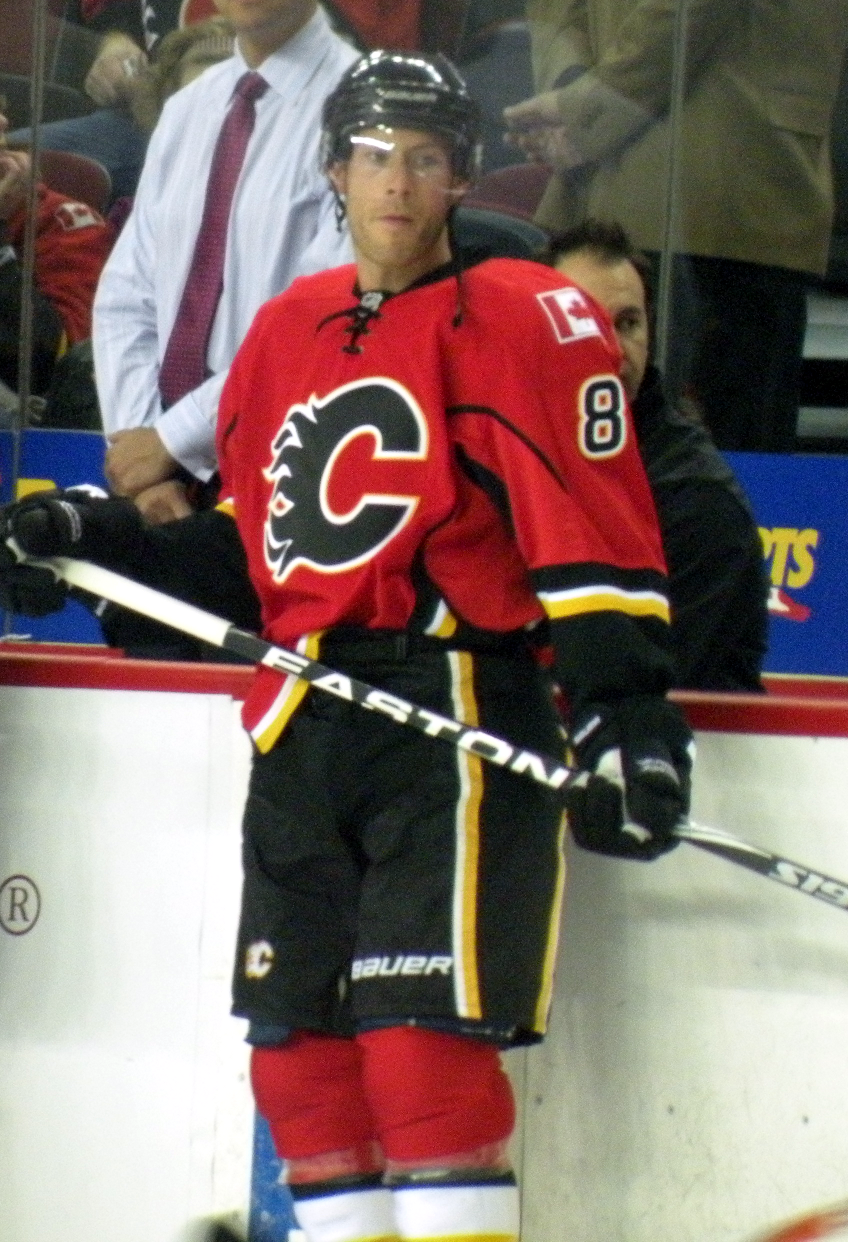
Morrison during his tenure with the Flames

Morrison signed with the Anaheim Ducks to a one-year, US$2.75 million contract on July 7, 2008. He had received interest from as many as nine NHL teams, including the Canucks, who offered a one-year, US$1.9 million deal prior to Morrison's free agency. Morrison scored his first goal as a Duck on November 7 in a 5–2 loss to the Dallas Stars. While it was hoped he could be a replacement for Andy McDonald as the team's second-line centre, Morrison struggled in his short tenure with the Ducks. He was relegated to the fourth line and made a healthy scratch at various points in the season. It was proposed by the media that he was not yet playing at full capacity on account of his off-season knee surgery. With 22 points in 62 games, he was waived by the Ducks leading up to the NHL trade deadline on March 3, 2009. He was claimed the following day by the Dallas Stars. He scored his first goal with the Stars on March 12, the game-winner in a 3–2 contest against the Carolina Hurricanes. Morrison's 2008–09 total of 31 points between the Ducks and Stars was the lowest output of his career (not including the previous season's injury-shortened campaign and his 11-game 1997–98 season).

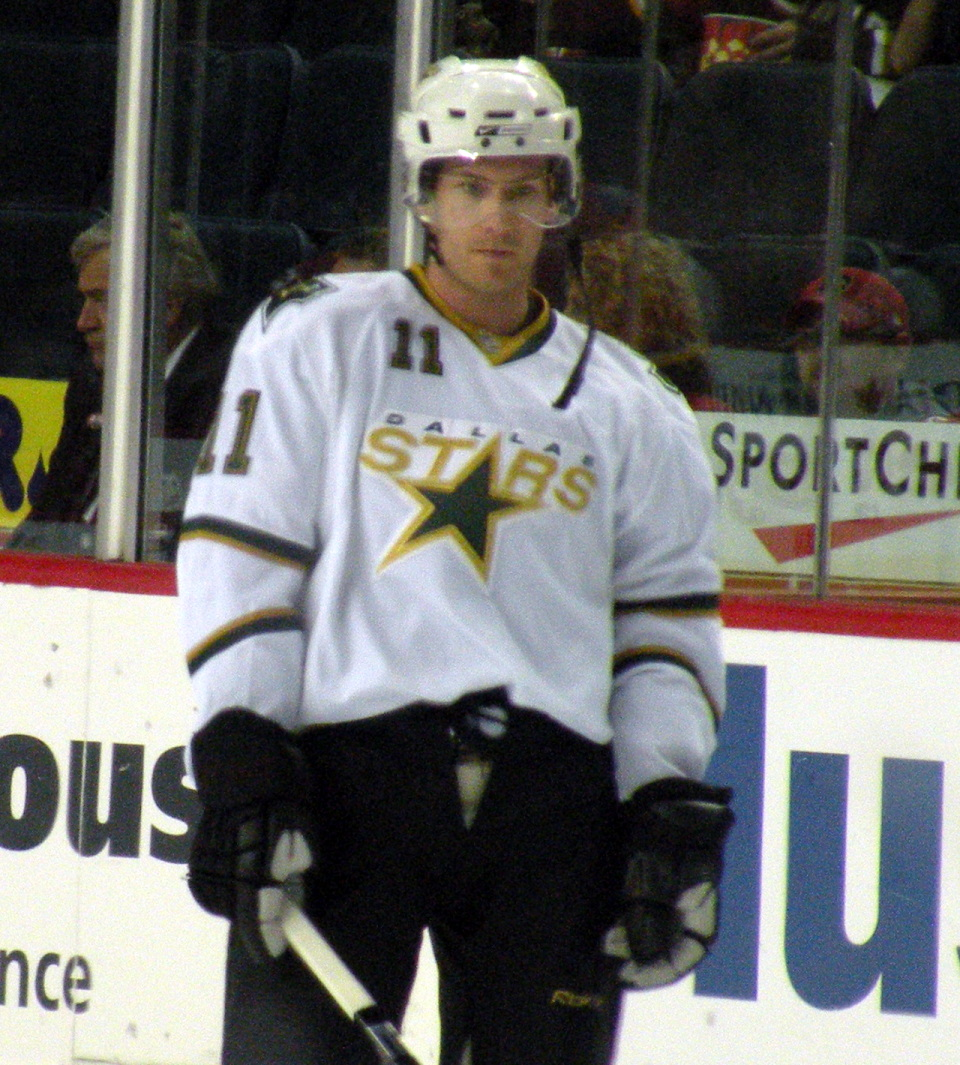
Morrison during his tenure with the Stars

In the off-season, he was signed as an unrestricted free agent by the Washington Capitals to a one-year, US$1.5 million contract on July 10, 2009. He registered his first goal as a Capital in the team's home opener, a 6–4 victory over the Toronto Maple Leafs, on October 3, 2009. In the final two months of the season, Morrison missed six games due to a leg injury. He finished the campaign with 42 points in 74 games with the Capitals, his highest total in three years. Returning in time for the 2010 playoffs, he registered one assists in five games as the top-seeded Capitals were eliminated by the Montreal Canadiens in the first round.

Becoming an unrestricted free agent for the third consecutive year in July 2010, Morrison did not initially receive any offers. As a result, he accepted a tryout with the Vancouver Canucks and attended the team's training camp in Penticton, British Columbia. At the conclusion of the pre-season, the Canucks offered Morrison a two-way contract, which he turned down. The following day, on October 4, 2010, Morrison was signed by the Calgary Flames to a one-year, one-way contract worth US$725,000. The Flames had signed Morrison in lieu of numerous injuries at the centre position on their roster. He scored his first goal as a Flame on October 16 in a 5–3 win against the Edmonton Oilers. After recording 43 points in 66 games, Morrison suffered a season-ending injury in March 2011. He hurt his left knee in a game against the Chicago Blackhawks when opposing defenceman Niklas Hjalmarsson pinned him against the end-boards. At the time of the injury, Morrison was leading the Flames with a plus-minus rating of +13 while centring the team's top line with Jarome Iginla and Alex Tanguay. On July 15, 2011, Morrison came to terms with the Flames on a one-year deal worth US$1.25 million.

On January 27, 2012, Morrison was traded to the Chicago Blackhawks in exchange for defenceman Brian Connelly. At season's end, he has not played an NHL game since.

== International play ==
Medal record

Representing Canada

Ice hockey

World Championships
Gold medal – first place	2004 Czech Republic	
Silver medal – second place	2005 Austria	

Morrison debuted with the Canadian national team at the 2000 IIHF World Championship in Saint Petersburg. He was joined on the team by four other Canucks—Todd Bertuzzi, Adrian Aucoin, Ed Jovanovski and Peter Schaefer. Scoring a goal and three assists over seven games, he helped Canada reach the bronze medal game, where they were defeated 2–1 by Finland. Morrison ranked sixth in team point-scoring and tied for first with Aucoin with a plus-minus rating of +7.

Four years later, Morrison was selected again to the Canadian team for the 2004 IIHF World Championship in Prague and Ostrava, Czech Republic. He was one of two Canucks players on the roster, alongside Matt Cooke. In the gold medal game, Morrison registered an assist, helping Canada to a 5–3 win over Sweden. With seven points in nine games, Morrison ranked third in team scoring, behind Dany Heatley and Daniel Brière.

Morrison made his second consecutive tournament appearance at the 2005 IIHF World Championship in Vienna and Innsbruck, Austria. He was named to the team alongside Canucks teammate Ed Jovanovski. Due to the 2004–05 NHL lockout, all NHL players were available to participate as there was no timing conflict with the Stanley Cup playoffs. Reaching the gold medal game for the second consecutive year, Canada was shut-out by the Czech Republic, 3–0. Morrison ranked third on the team in goal-scoring with four; he had no assists.

Several months later, Morrison was invited to Canada's Olympic Orientation Camp in August 2005—a part of the selection process for the 2006 Winter Olympics in Turin. He was a late addition, replacing Mario Lemieux, who chose not to attend due to commitments with his club team, the Pittsburgh Penguins. Morrison was not chosen to the final roster.

== Personal life ==
Morrison was born in Pitt Meadows, British Columbia, to Ron and Deborah Morrison. He has a sister named Jennifer. His parents had moved to Pitt Meadows from Windsor, Ontario, in the 1970s. Ron coached his son on minor hockey teams, before Morrison moved away from home at age 17 to play junior hockey in Penticton.

Morrison and his wife Erin have one son, Brayden, and three daughters, Makenna, Kailyn and Taylor. During his career with the Vancouver Canucks, Morrison resided year-round with his family in Coquitlam, British Columbia. He spent a year living with his family in Newport Beach, California, during his stint with the Anaheim Ducks.

Morrison currently resides in Calgary, Alberta. Since retirement, he has ventured into business with Geoff Sanderson, establishing a company called Breakaway Matting Inc.

He currently hosts a fishing and adventure show, Reel West Coast, on CHEK TV-DT and YouTube. On the show he is often joined by former Vancouver Canucks and other NHL players.

== Career statistics ==
=== Regular season and playoffs ===
			Regular season					Playoffs
Season	Team	League	GP	G	A	Pts	PIM	GP	G	A	Pts	PIM
1990–91	Ridge Meadows Knights	Midget	77	126	127	253	88	—	—	—	—	—
1991–92	Ridge Meadows Lightning	Midget	55	56	111	167	56	—	—	—	—	—
1992–93	Penticton Panthers	BCHL	56	35	59	94	45	—	—	—	—	—
1993–94	Michigan Wolverines	CCHA	38	20	28	48	24	5	2	7	9	2
1994–95	Michigan Wolverines	CCHA	39	23	53	76	42	5	1	11	12	6
1995–96	Michigan Wolverines	CCHA	35	28	44	72	41	7	6	9	15	4
1996–97	Michigan Wolverines	CCHA	43	31	57	88	52	6	6	8	14	8
1997–98	Albany River Rats	AHL	72	35	49	84	44	8	3	4	7	19
1997–98	New Jersey Devils	NHL	11	5	4	9	0	3	0	1	1	0
1998–99	New Jersey Devils	NHL	76	13	33	46	18	7	0	2	2	0
1999–2000	SK Horácká Slavia Třebíč	CZE.2	2	0	0	0	0	—	—	—	—	—
1999–2000	HC IPB Pojišťovna Pardubice	ELH	6	5	2	7	2	—	—	—	—	—
1999–2000	New Jersey Devils	NHL	44	5	21	26	8	—	—	—	—	—
1999–2000	Vancouver Canucks	NHL	12	2	7	9	10	—	—	—	—	—
2000–01	Vancouver Canucks	NHL	82	16	38	54	42	4	1	2	3	0
2001–02	Vancouver Canucks	NHL	82	23	44	67	26	6	0	2	2	6
2002–03	Vancouver Canucks	NHL	82	25	46	71	36	14	4	7	11	18
2003–04	Vancouver Canucks	NHL	82	22	38	60	50	7	2	3	5	8
2004–05	Linköpings HC	SEL	45	16	28	44	50	6	0	2	2	10
2005–06	Vancouver Canucks	NHL	82	19	37	56	84	—	—	—	—	—
2006–07	Vancouver Canucks	NHL	82	20	31	51	60	12	1	3	4	6
2007–08	Vancouver Canucks	NHL	39	9	16	25	18	—	—	—	—	—
2008–09	Anaheim Ducks	NHL	62	10	12	22	16	—	—	—	—	—
2008–09	Dallas Stars	NHL	19	6	3	9	16	—	—	—	—	—
2009–10	Washington Capitals	NHL	74	12	30	42	40	5	0	1	1	2
2010–11	Calgary Flames	NHL	66	9	34	43	16	—	—	—	—	—
2011–12	Calgary Flames	NHL	28	4	7	11	6	—	—	—	—	—
2011–12	Chicago Blackhawks	NHL	11	0	0	0	6	3	1	0	1	0
NHL totals			934	200	401	601	452	61	9	21	30	40

=== International ===
Year	Team	Event	GP	G	A	Pts	PIM
2000	Canada	WC	7	1	3	4	2
2004	Canada	WC	9	1	6	7	6
2005	Canada	WC	9	4	0	4	10
Senior totals			25	6	9	15	18

== Awards ==
=== Junior ===
Award	Year(s)
Bruce Allison Memorial Trophy (BCJHL Interior Conference Rookie of the Year)	1993

=== College ===
Award	Year(s)
CCHA Rookie of the Year	1994
All-CCHA Rookie Team	1993–94
All-CCHA First Team	1995, 1996, 1997
CCHA Player of the Year	1996, 1997
CCHA All-Tournament Team	1997
AHCA West First-Team All-American	1995, 1996, 1997
NCAA Tournament Most Outstanding Player	1996
All-NCAA All-Tournament Team	1996
Hobey Baker Award	1997

=== Professional ===
Award	Year(s)
AHL All-Rookie Team	1998

== Records ==
- Michigan Wolverines' all-time points leader – 284 (surpassed Denny Felsner)

== Notes ==
Awards and achievements
Preceded by Chris Brooks	CCHA Rookie of the Year; 1993–94	Succeeded by Marty Turco
Preceded by Dean Fedorchuk, Tavis MacMillan; Martin St. Louis, Éric Perrin	NCAA Ice Hockey Scoring Champion; 1994–95; 1996–97	Succeeded by Martin St. Louis, Éric Perrin; Marty Reasoner
Preceded by Brian Holzinger	CCHA Player of the Year; 1995–96, 1996–97	Succeeded by Chad Alban
Preceded by Chris O'Sullivan	NCAA Tournament Most Outstanding Player; 1996	Succeeded by Matt Henderson
Preceded by John Madden	CCHA Most Valuable Player in Tournament; 1997	Succeeded by Mike York
Preceded by Brian Bonin	Winner of the Hobey Baker Award; 1997	Succeeded by Chris Drury
Sporting positions
Preceded by Kārlis Skrastiņš	Active NHL Ironman; February 25, 2007 – December 12, 2007	Succeeded by Cory Sarich
