= Maple Meadow =

Maple Meadow and Maple Meadows may refer to:

- Maple Meadow, West Virginia, an unincorporated community in Raleigh County
- Maple Meadows Station, a railroad station in British Columbia, Canada
