= Mission City (disambiguation) =

Mission, British Columbia, once known as Mission City, is a city in Canada.

Mission City may also refer to:

- Mission City station, in Mission, British Columbia, terminus of the West Coast Express
- Mission City, a fictional city in Nevada in the 2007 film Transformers
