= Pitt Meadows =

- City
- City of Pitt Meadows
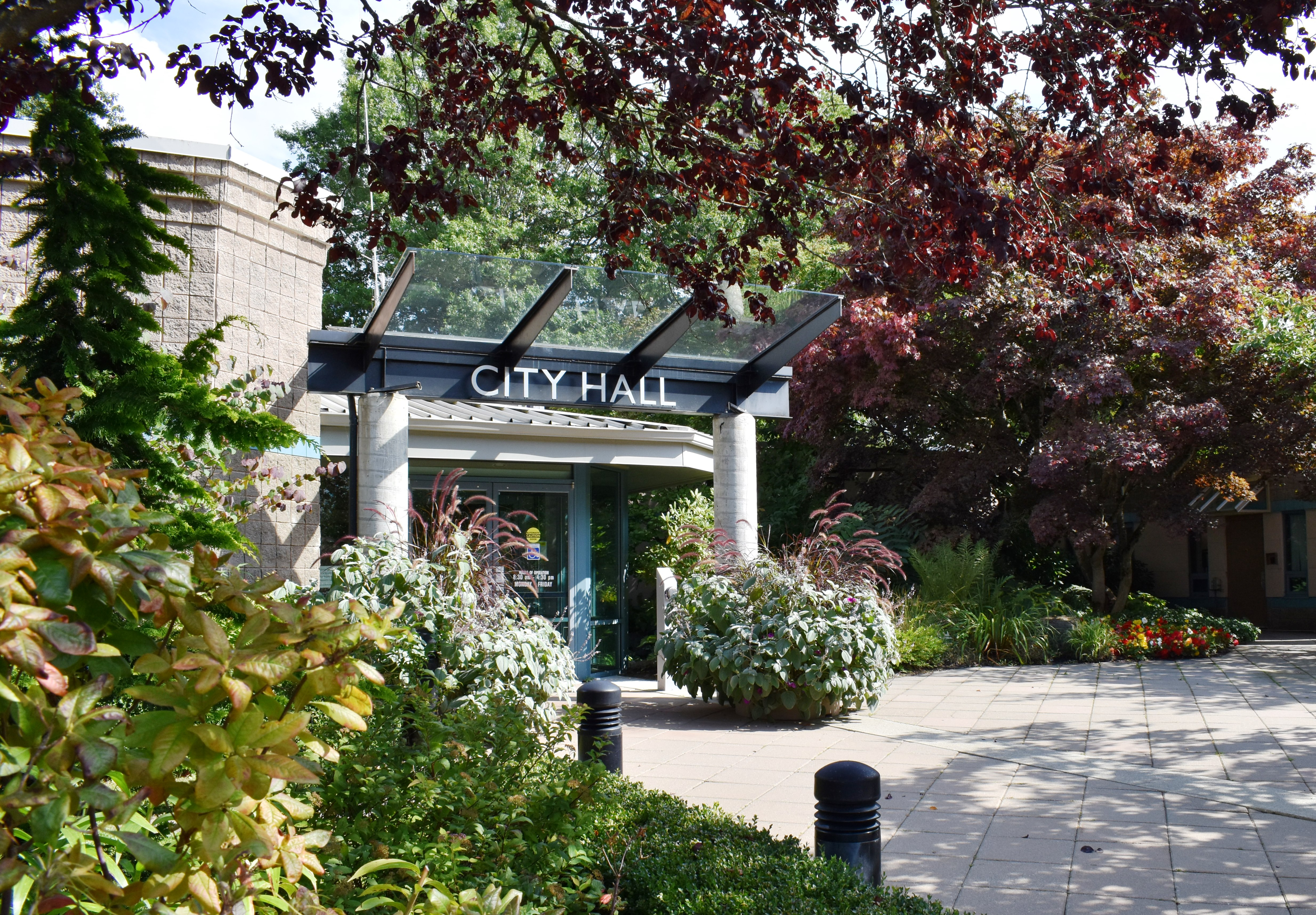
- Pitt Meadows City Hall.

- Flag
- Motto: "Prosperity Through Endeavour"
- Location of Pitt Meadows in Metro Vancouver

- Location within British Columbia Location within Canada Location within North America
- Coordinates: 49°13′14″N 122°41′22″W
- Country: Canada
- Province: British Columbia
- Regional district: Metro Vancouver
- Incorporated as a district municipality: April 25, 1914
- Incorporated as a city: January 1, 2007
- Named for: Pitt River, Pitt Lake

Government
  - Type: Mayor-council government
  - Body: Pitt Meadows City Council
  - Mayor: Nicole MacDonald
  - City Council: List of Councillors: Tracy Elke; Alison Evans; Mike Hayes; Mike Manion; Bob Meachen; Gwen O’Connell
  - MP: Marc Dalton (CPC)
  - MLA: Lisa Beare (BC NDP)

Area
  - Land: 86.34 km^{2} (33.34 sq mi)
- Elevation: 8 m (26 ft)

Population (2021)
  - Total: 19,146
  - Estimate (2024): 19,498
  - Density: 221.7/km^{2} (574/sq mi)
- Time zone: UTC−07:00 (BC Pacific Time)
- Forward sortation area: V3Y
- Area codes: 604, 778, 236, 672
- Website: www.pittmeadows.ca

Pitt Meadows is a city within Metro Vancouver in southwestern British Columbia, Canada. Incorporated in 1914, it currently has a land area of 86.34 square kilometres (33.34 sq mi) with an estimate population of 19,498 as of 2024. The city received its name from the Pitt River and Pitt Lake. Pitt Meadows is one of the cities in British Columbia including Electoral Area A that comprises the Metro Vancouver Regional District.

Pitt Meadows is 110 years old. Indigenous Peoples have resided in Pitt Meadows for approximately 1000 years. James McMillan explored the area in 1874. The Municipality of Maple Ridge, which included the Pitt Meadows area, was incorporated in 1874. In 1892, residents of the Pitt Meadows area petitioned for their removal from the District of Maple Ridge. In 1893, the first dyking district was organized; however, the Fraser River Flood of 1894 flooded many acres of land in Pitt Meadows.

In 1914, Pitt Meadows was a small, agricultural community of less than 250 individuals which supplied Vancouver and New Westminster with produce and dairy products. In 1995, Pitt Meadows became a member municipality of Metro Vancouver. In 2007, the District of Pitt Meadows was incorporated as the City of Pitt Meadows. In 2014, Pitt Meadows' centennial occurred.

== History ==
=== Early settlement ===
Indigenous Peoples resided in the Pitt Meadows area approximately 1000 years ago. James McMillan explored the area during the 1824 Hudson's Bay Company expedition to the Lower Fraser. Europeans started a settlement known as Bonson's Landing in the area in the 1870s. Early settlers were mostly Anglo-Saxon until after 1910. The municipality takes its name from the Pitt River and Pitt Lake. The river, the lake and the settlement were named for British prime minister William Pitt the Younger. The Municipality of Maple Ridge, which included the Pitt Meadows area, was incorporated in 1874. In 1885, the Canadian Pacific Railway was constructed through Pitt Meadows to Port Moody, and Vancouver soon after.

The Pitt Meadows General Store, which was constructed in 1886, was moved to its current location in 1908. A garden has existed since the early years of development on the Site. The store, which contained the community's first Post Office and the first telephone, has been the home of the Pitt Meadows Museum and Archives since June 1998.

In 1892, residents of the Pitt Meadows area petitioned for their removal from the District of Maple Ridge. In 1893, the first dyking district was organized. The Fraser River Flood of 1894 flooded many acres of land in the spring.

=== Incorporation ===
Pitt Meadows reverted to unorganized territory from 1892 until it was separately incorporated as a municipality in 1914. In 1914, Pitt Meadows was a small, agricultural community of less than 250 individuals which supplied Vancouver and New Westminster with produce and dairy products. After 1910, many French Canadians and Japanese arrived as settlers.

=== After World War II ===
During World War II, Pitt Meadows lost servicemen including: Aircraftman 2nd Class William George Bend; Ordinary Seaman John Pastorek and Flight Lieutenant Robert Arnold Samuel Lasser.

A large group of Dutch farmers reclaimed much of the low-lying land in Pitt Meadows after World War II. Pitt Meadows joined the Greater Vancouver Water District in 1948.

In 1948, a major flood occurred after cool weather through mid-May allowed an unusually large snowpack to accumulate, and a sudden shift to warm temperatures caused a fast melt.

In 1957, the second Pitt River Bridge, opened. Replacing the first bridge built in 1915. A twin bridge was built to complement the 1957 bridge in 1978.

The Pitt Meadows Regional Airport opened in 1963.

=== Heritage Preservation Area ===
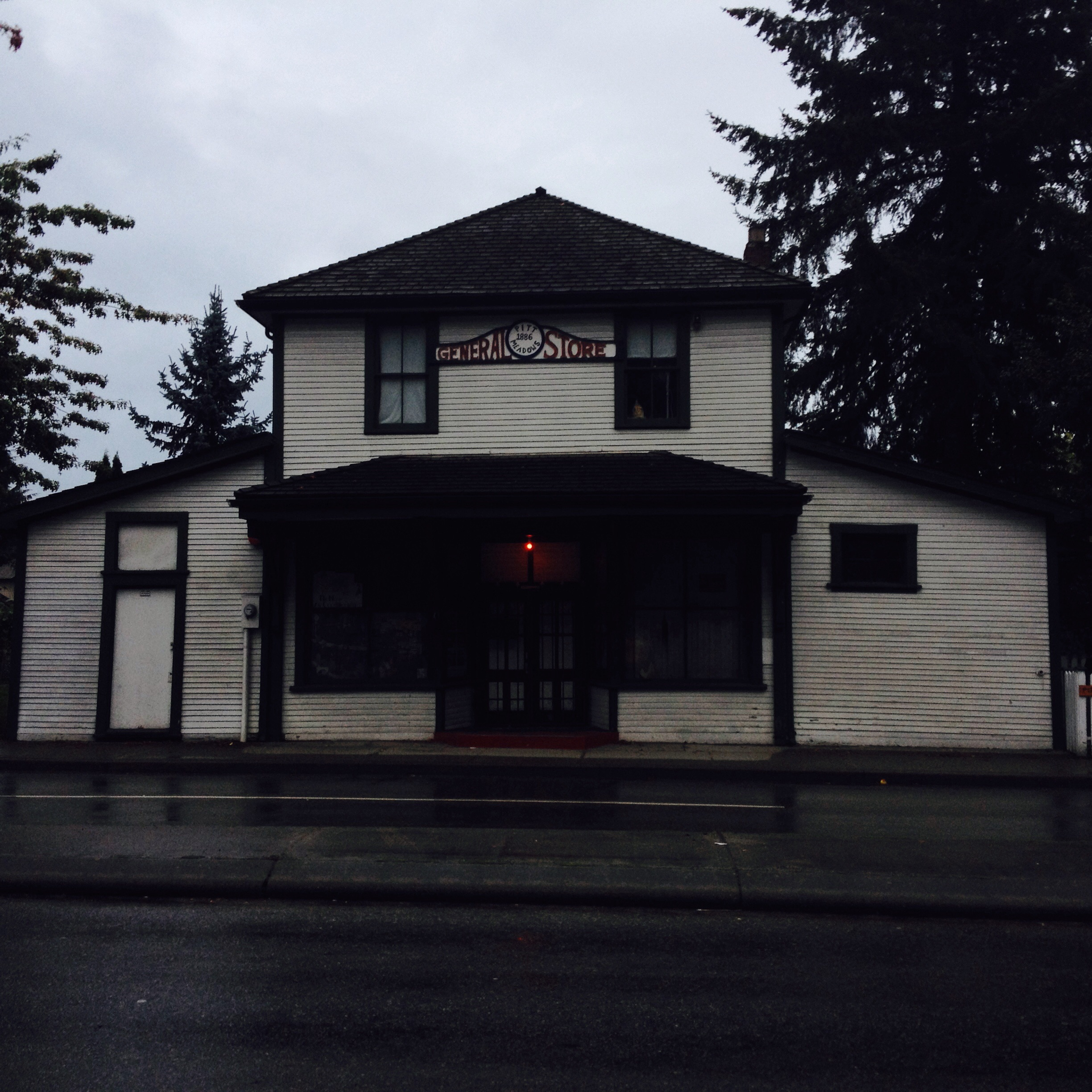
Pitt Meadows Museum

A Heritage Preservation Area contains several buildings of significant heritage value, including the old General Store (now the Pitt Meadows Museum) and Hoffman and Sons Garage. Hans Hoffmann, a mechanic, worked in and then ran the family business of Hoffmann and Son Ltd. for almost 45 years. In 1974, Hans began his hobby of collecting and restoring stationary gasoline engines.

=== Cenotaph ===
In 1990, the Pitt Meadows Cenotaph was constructed "in memory of all those who have served and died for us." The City of Pitt Meadows received funding for the restoration of the Pitt Meadows Cenotaph, in 2009. In 2012, British Columbia formally apologized to the Japanese-Canadian community for the internment of thousands of people during the Second World War. Tosh Suzuki's family spent nine years in Manitoba after being displaced from their Pitt Meadows berry farm.

=== Symbols ===
The announcement of the Letters Patent for Pitt Meadows, and Grant of Arms, Supporters, Flag and Badge was made on March 12, 2005, in Volume 139, page 688 of the Canada Gazette. The Arms consist of the colours purple and gold, its heron emblem and a band running parallel to the edge of the shield which represents the dykes which protect the lands of the municipality. The crenellated outer edge represents gearwheels and refer to the historic Hoffman garage. The horizontal bands symbolize the CP railway line around which the District grew. The motto is Prosperity through endeavour. The crest coronet represents Golden Ears peaks to the north of the District. The white drops in the crest recall the early dairy industry. The Katzie eagle symbol in the crest recalls the original Aboriginal inhabitants and recreational aviation.

Pitt Meadows symbols
Heraldic badge of Pitt Meadows, BC

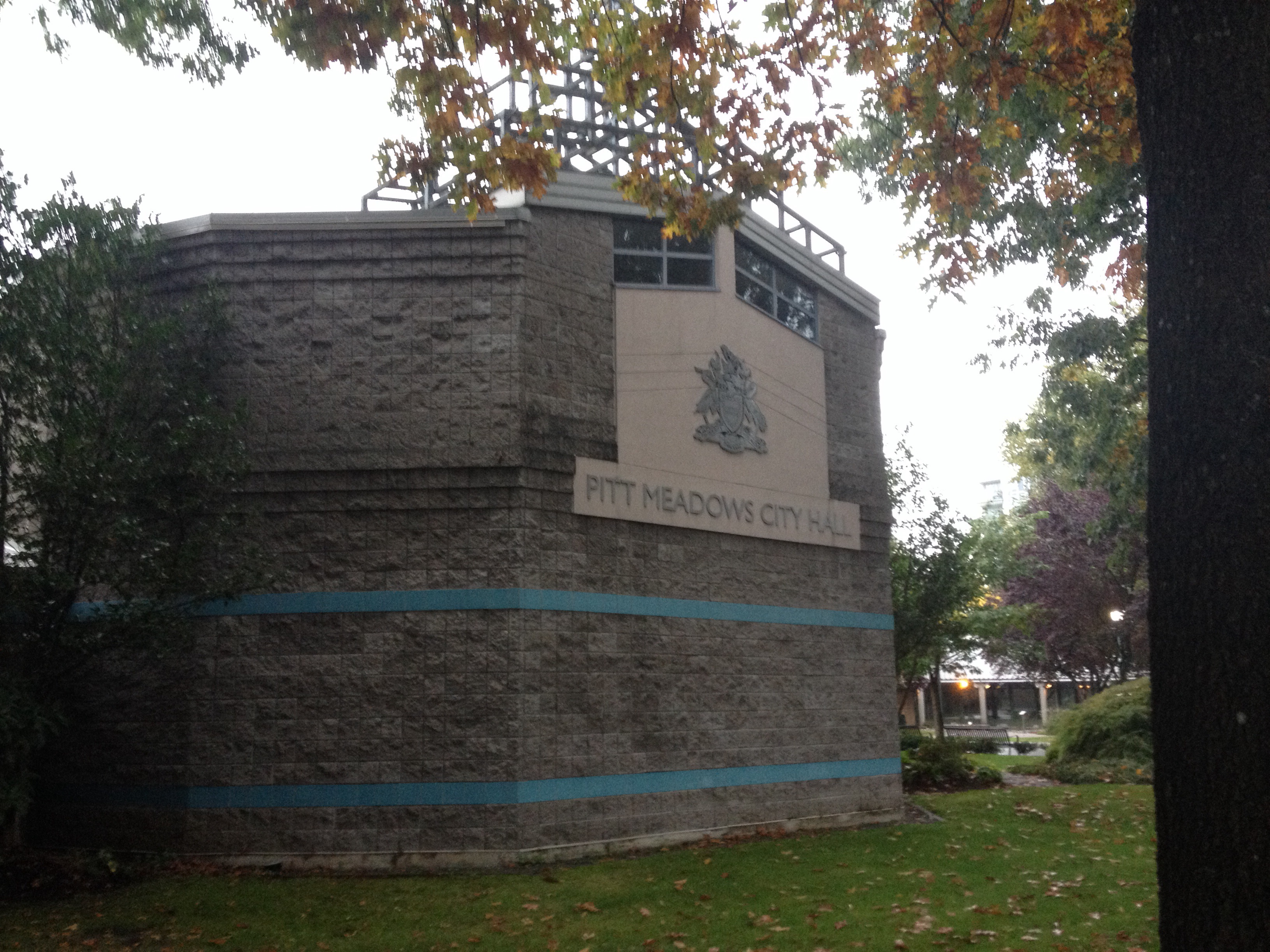
Pitt Meadows Townhall Crest

Herald of Pitt Meadows, BC

Former flag of Pitt Meadows

=== Centennial ===
In 2014, in recognition of Pitt Meadows' centennial, anniversary special festivities and a Community Birthday Party were held. The Mission Folk Music Festival Society will present the 27th and 28th editions of the Mission Folk Music Festival in 2014/2015.

== Geography ==
Pitt Meadows is located in the Lower Fraser Valley, east of Vancouver. Most residents live in the urban town centre, which is located on a highland area. 82% of Pitt Meadows is within the Green Zone, lands, including watersheds and 200-year floodplains, forests, wilderness areas, wildlife habitats, wetlands, recreational areas, farms and forestry areas that are fundamental to Metro Vancouver's character and ecology. Pitt Meadows, an agricultural town, is over 68% within a floodplain with 86% of Pitt Meadows lying within the BC Agricultural Land Reserve as protected farmland. Lands designated as environmentally sensitive include wildlife conservation areas such as Pitt-Addington Marsh and Codd Wetland Ecological Conservancy Area, and the banks of the Fraser, Pitt and Alouette Rivers. Other areas of Pitt Meadows that are within the Green Zone include most of the river side of the dikes, municipal parks and greenways.

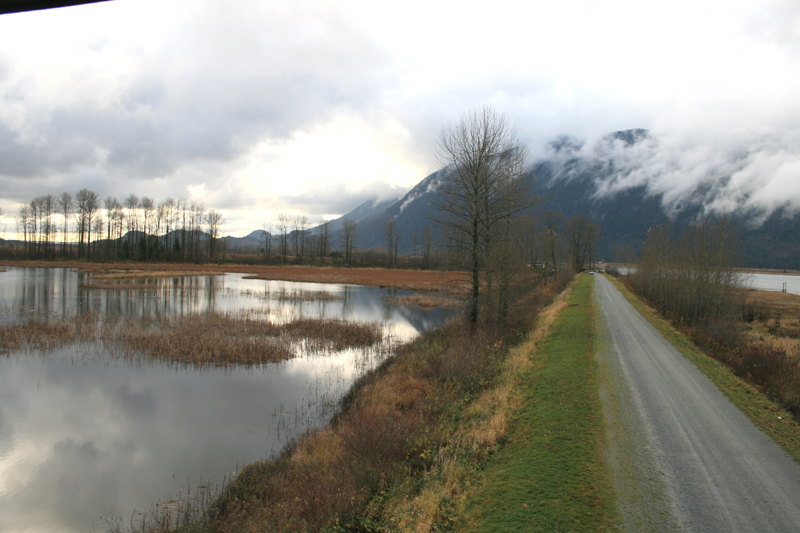
Pitt Lake bog and dike

Pitt Meadows is sandwiched on the north side of the Fraser River at its junction with the Pitt River on the west and Maple Ridge on the east. Two arms of the Alouette River run through Pitt Meadows, along with a number of other sloughs and waterways. To the north, Pitt Lake is the largest freshwater tidal lake in the world, connected by the Pitt River to the Fraser River, which is the southern boundary of Pitt Meadows. The Pitt River flows backwards at high tide and has created a delta where it joins Pitt lake. The Thompson Mountain Range rises along the Pitt Meadows's northeast edge. Pitt Meadows is protected from flooding by 64 kilometres of dikes which provide a multi-use trail system alongside the farmland and marshes, and offer views of the mountains to the north. The northern sector of the flood plain, closest to Pitt Lake, presents several challenges to development; it is largely a peat bog containing a large wildlife refuge. The deep peat and bog soil conditions sometimes require considerable fill and/or pre-loading prior to development. On the west side of the Pitt River is Port Coquitlam. Pitt Meadows is located between the rapidly developing communities of Coquitlam, Port Coquitlam, Maple Ridge, Surrey and Langley.

=== Climate ===
Like most of the lower mainland, Pitt Meadows features an oceanic climate, with warm summers and cool, rainy winters.

Pitt Meadows

Climate chart (precipitation, max. and min. temperature)
J	F	M	A	M	J	J	A	S	O	N	D
252 7 1	134 9 0	173 11 2	105 15 5	95 19 8	69 21 11	48 25 13	36 25 12	94 22 10	180 15 6	249 10 2	214 6 0
- █ Average max. and min. temperatures in °C
- █ Precipitation totals in mm
- Source: Environment Canada
Imperial conversion
J	F	M	A	M	J	J	A	S	O	N	D
9.9 44 33	5.3 48 33	6.8 52 36	4.1 59 40	3.8 66 46	2.7 70 51	1.9 77 55	1.4 77 54	3.7 71 50	7.1 59 43	9.8 49 36	8.4 43 32
- █ Average max. and min. temperatures in °F
- █ Precipitation totals in inches

Climate data for Pitt Meadows CS WMO ID: 71775; normals 1991–2020 normals, extremes 1993–present
Month	Jan	Feb	Mar	Apr	May	Jun	Jul	Aug	Sep	Oct	Nov	Dec	Year
Record high humidex	19.5	19.4	24.8	29.6	34.0	47.0	44.2	40.2	37.8	31.2	23.0	19.1	47.0
Record high °C (°F)	17.1 (62.8)	19.6 (67.3)	25.0 (77.0)	29.8 (85.6)	33.2 (91.8)	41.4 (106.5)	37.6 (99.7)	36.6 (97.9)	34.4 (93.9)	27.7 (81.9)	20.0 (68.0)	16.5 (61.7)	41.4 (106.5)
Mean maximum °C (°F)	12.8 (55.0)	14.5 (58.1)	18.7 (65.7)	23.7 (74.7)	27.8 (82.0)	30.3 (86.5)	32.9 (91.2)	32.2 (90.0)	29.3 (84.7)	22.2 (72.0)	15.7 (60.3)	12.5 (54.5)	34.0 (93.2)
Mean daily maximum °C (°F)	6.8 (44.2)	8.8 (47.8)	11.3 (52.3)	14.9 (58.8)	19.0 (66.2)	21.3 (70.3)	25.0 (77.0)	25.1 (77.2)	21.5 (70.7)	15.0 (59.0)	9.6 (49.3)	6.1 (43.0)	15.4 (59.7)
Daily mean °C (°F)	3.6 (38.5)	4.6 (40.3)	6.8 (44.2)	9.7 (49.5)	13.5 (56.3)	16.1 (61.0)	18.8 (65.8)	18.8 (65.8)	15.7 (60.3)	10.5 (50.9)	6.0 (42.8)	3.1 (37.6)	10.6 (51.1)
Mean daily minimum °C (°F)	0.5 (32.9)	0.4 (32.7)	2.3 (36.1)	4.5 (40.1)	7.9 (46.2)	10.8 (51.4)	12.6 (54.7)	12.4 (54.3)	9.8 (49.6)	5.9 (42.6)	2.4 (36.3)	0.1 (32.2)	5.8 (42.4)
Mean minimum °C (°F)	−8.0 (17.6)	−6.1 (21.0)	−3.4 (25.9)	−0.7 (30.7)	2.2 (36.0)	6.4 (43.5)	8.5 (47.3)	8.4 (47.1)	4.6 (40.3)	−0.6 (30.9)	−5.0 (23.0)	−7.5 (18.5)	−10.7 (12.7)
Record low °C (°F)	−15.7 (3.7)	−12.4 (9.7)	−7.7 (18.1)	−3.1 (26.4)	−1.0 (30.2)	3.8 (38.8)	5.2 (41.4)	5.1 (41.2)	0.9 (33.6)	−6.0 (21.2)	−12.8 (9.0)	−16.3 (2.7)	−16.3 (2.7)
Record low wind chill	−23.0	−14.9	−11.6	−5.0	0.0	0.0	0.0	0.0	0.0	−7.3	−16.7	−20.0	−23.0
Average precipitation mm (inches)	252.4 (9.94)	133.6 (5.26)	173.4 (6.83)	104.5 (4.11)	95.3 (3.75)	68.9 (2.71)	47.6 (1.87)	36.3 (1.43)	94.0 (3.70)	180.0 (7.09)	249.0 (9.80)	214.1 (8.43)	1,649 (64.92)
Average precipitation days (≥ 0.2 mm)	22.2	17.8	20.3	15.2	13.2	12.8	8.7	7.5	11.3	18.0	21.4	21.8	189.8
Average dew point °C (°F)	1.8 (35.2)	1.1 (34.0)	2.7 (36.9)	4.7 (40.5)	8.0 (46.4)	10.5 (50.9)	12.7 (54.9)	13.1 (55.6)	11.3 (52.3)	7.6 (45.7)	3.9 (39.0)	1.4 (34.5)	6.6 (43.9)
Source 1: Environment Canada
Source 2: weatherstats.ca (for dewpoint and monthly/yearly average absolute maximum/minimum temperature)

== Demographics ==
Historical population
Year	Pop.	±%
1921	595	—
1931	832	+39.8%
1941	1,119	+34.5%
1951	1,434	+28.2%
1956	1,652	+15.2%
1961	2,187	+32.4%
1966	2,247	+2.7%
1971	2,771	+23.3%
1976	4,689	+69.2%
1981	6,209	+32.4%
1986	8,004	+28.9%
1991	11,147	+39.3%
1996	13,436	+20.5%
2001	14,670	+9.2%
2006	15,623	+6.5%
2011	17,736	+13.5%
2016	18,573	+4.7%
2021	19,146	+3.1%

In the 2021 census of Population conducted by Statistics Canada, Pitt Meadows had a population of 19,146 living in 7,404 of its 7,628 total private dwellings, a change of 3.1% from its 2016 population of 18,573. With a land area of 86.34 km^{2} (33.34 sq mi), it had a population density of 221.8/km^{2} (574.3/sq mi) in 2021.

=== Ethnicity ===
Panethnic groups in the City of Pitt Meadows (2001−2021)
Panethnic group	2021		2016		2011		2006		2001	
Panethnic group	Pop.	%	Pop.	%	Pop.	%	Pop.	%	Pop.	%
European (Note: Statistic includes all persons that did not make up part of a visible minority or an indigenous identity.)	13,670	71.85%	14,375	78.02%	13,860	78.26%	12,865	82.39%	12,770	87.14%
East Asian (Note: Statistic includes total responses of "Chinese", "Korean", and "Japanese" under visible minority section on census.)	1,250	6.57%	960	5.21%	675	3.81%	930	5.96%	390	2.66%
Southeast Asian (Note: Statistic includes total responses of "Filipino" and "Southeast Asian" under visible minority section on census.)	1,055	5.55%	835	4.53%	760	4.29%	345	2.21%	155	1.06%
South Asian	1,020	5.36%	830	4.5%	945	5.34%	810	5.19%	795	5.42%
Indigenous	780	4.1%	565	3.07%	805	4.55%	385	2.47%	310	2.12%
Middle Eastern (Note: Statistic includes total responses of "West Asian" and "Arab" under visible minority section on census.)	435	2.29%	230	1.25%	130	0.73%	45	0.29%	10	0.07%
Latin American	295	1.55%	195	1.06%	235	1.33%	80	0.51%	60	0.41%
African	165	0.87%	205	1.11%	190	1.07%	65	0.42%	115	0.78%
Other/multiracial (Note: Statistic includes total responses of "Visible minority, n.i.e." and "Multiple visible minorities" under visible minority section on census.)	360	1.89%	115	0.62%	100	0.56%	85	0.54%	55	0.38%
Total responses	19,025	99.37%	18,425	99.2%	17,710	99.85%	15,615	99.95%	14,655	99.9%
Total population	19,146	100%	18,573	100%	17,736	100%	15,623	100%	14,670	100%
Note: Totals greater than 100% due to multiple origin responses.

=== Religion ===
According to the 2021 census, religious groups in Pitt Meadows included:

- Irreligion (10,000 persons or 52.6%)
- Christianity (7,570 persons or 39.8%)
- Sikhism (640 persons or 3.4%)
- Islam (450 persons or 2.4%)
- Buddhism (170 persons or 0.9%)
- Hinduism (75 persons or 0.4%)
- Judaism (30 persons or 0.2%)
- Other (90 persons or 0.5%)

== Transportation ==
=== River ===
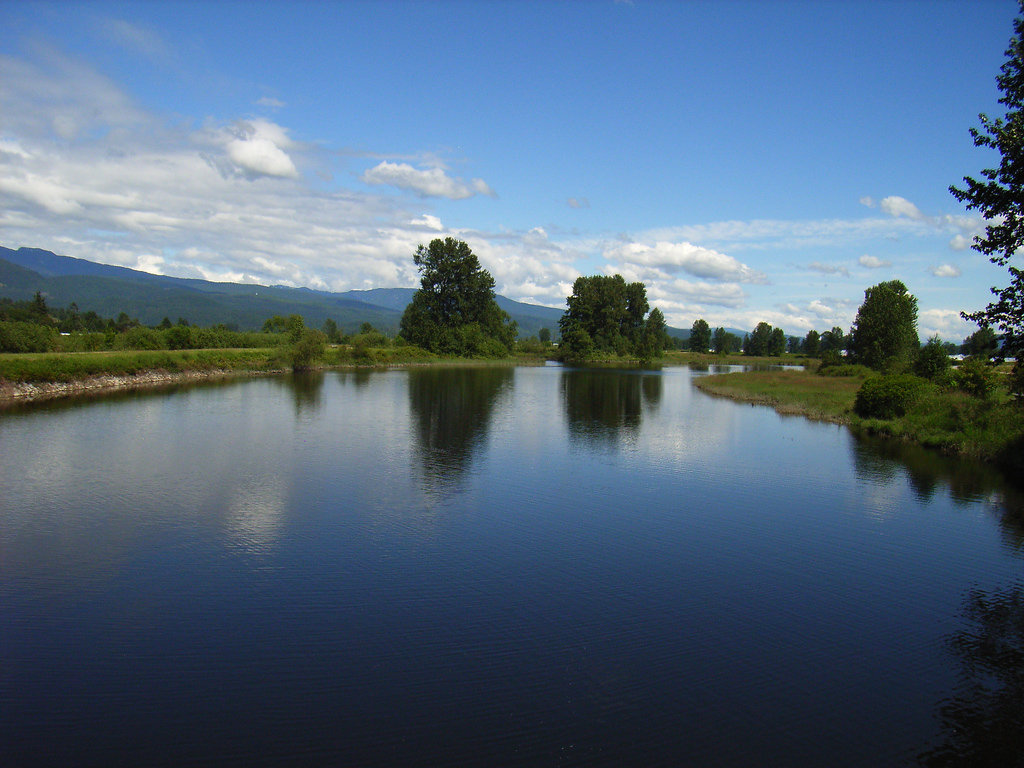
Alouette River

Pitt Meadows is naturally isolated from the rest of the Lower Mainland by the Pitt River and the Fraser River. The major urbanized portion of the Lower Mainland is located on the Burrard Peninsula, on the other side of the Pitt River from Pitt Meadows. The Fraser, Pitt and Alouette Rivers played a pivotal role in the development of Pitt Meadows by providing transportation routes, fishing areas and nourishing flood water to the farm areas. Today, the Fraser River is an extensively used navigation channel for both industrial traffic and recreational use. Although the Pitt River sees less traffic, its foreshore is an important area for log storage. The Alouette River continues to be important to the farming areas.

=== Canadian Pacific Railway ===
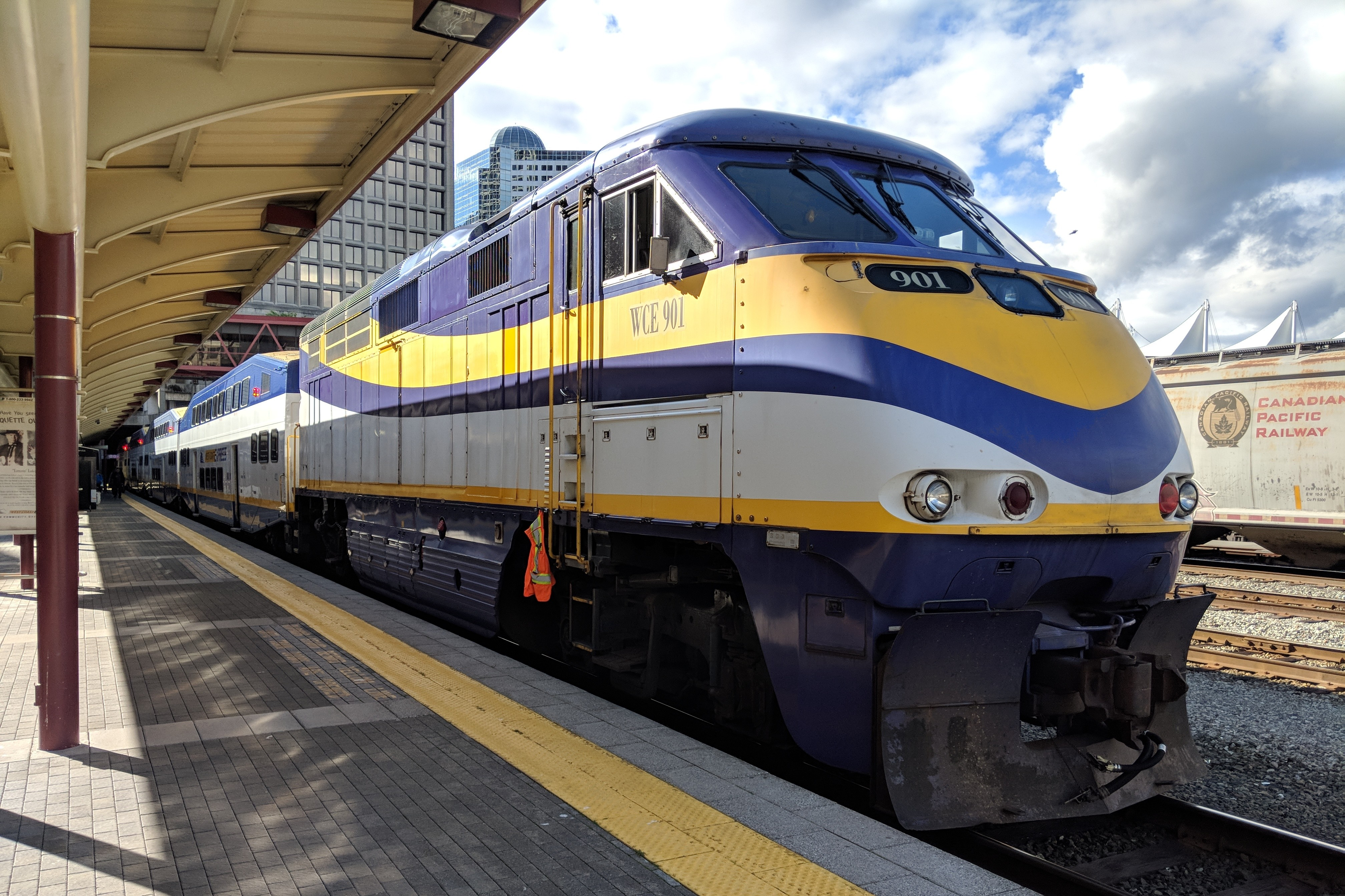
West Coast Express commuter train

Its first land-based transportation route came in 1885 with the construction of the Canadian Pacific Railway (CPR) through to Port Moody. The main portion of the town of Pitt Meadows is bisected by the CPR mainline. The highway bridge over the Pitt River was opened in 1957. As of 2003, the CPR intermodal yards and distribution centre west of the Pitt Meadows station in the town centre are being expanded.

=== Airport ===
In 1963, the Pitt Meadows Airport was opened. There are height restrictions on buildings due to the proximity of the Pitt Meadows Airport to the southeast, although the recent development of a 10-storey building less than two kilometres (1.2 mi) from the east–west runways puts those restrictions in doubt. In 2003, the airport was undergoing expansion to support scheduled passenger service for short-haul prop-driven planes. The airport is also home to a skydiving school, as well as a number of other businesses. On August 3, 2008, a Beech 65-A90 King Air took off from Pitt Meadows Airport, with the pilot and seven parachutists for a local sky diving flight. The pilot reported an engine failure and turned back towards Pitt Meadows Airport, which could not be reached and a forced landing was carried out in a cranberry field, 400 metres (1,300 ft) west of the airport. Four of the parachutists received serious injuries and the aircraft was substantially damaged although there was no fire and the occupants were evacuated. Pitt Meadows Water Aerodrome, (TC LID: CAJ8), is located 1 nautical mile (1.9 km; 1.2 mi) southwest of Pitt Meadows.

=== Bridges & highways ===
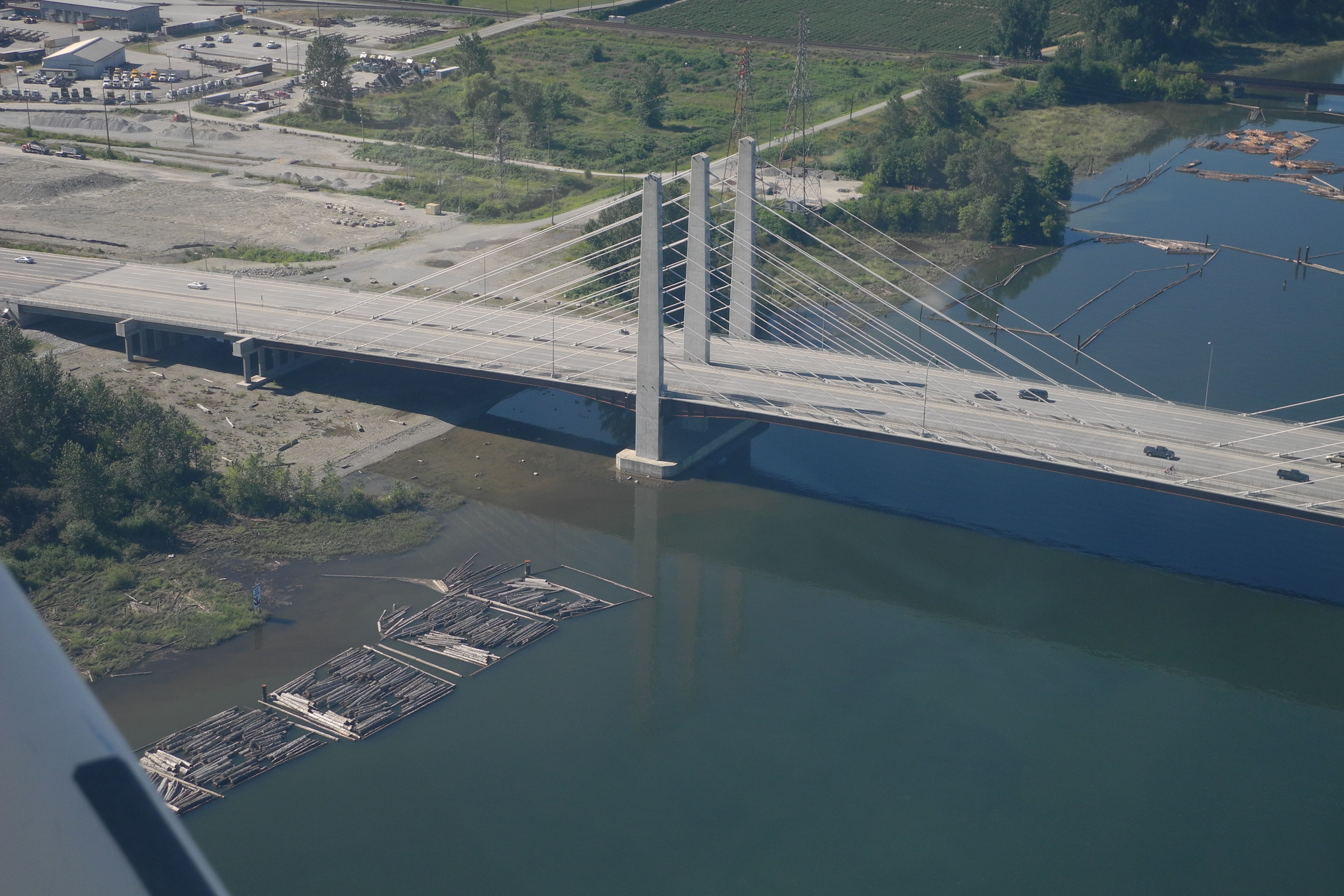
Pitt River Bridge & Lougheed Hwy

Lougheed Highway is the main road route through Pitt Meadows and along the north shore of the Fraser River. The Pitt River Bridge links it to the Burrard Peninsula to the west.

The Pitt River Bridge and Mary Hill Interchange Project included a new seven-lane bridge that replaced the existing swing bridges, as well as an interchange to replace the current Lougheed Highway and Mary Hill Bypass intersection. Golden Ears Bridge, which connects Pitt Meadows and Maple Ridge to Surrey and Langley, opened in 2009. Golden Ears is the name of the summit that lies north of Pitt Meadows. In 2011, Lougheed Highway upgrades included the widening and extension of the westbound HOV lane between the Golden Ears Bridge and Harris Road, the addition of bus queue jump lanes in both directions, at the Kennedy Road intersection leading to and from the Pitt River Bridge. The Golden Ears Bridge, completed in summer of 2009, connects Pitt Meadows and Maple Ridge with the communities of Langley and Surrey south across the Fraser River. Construction of the new Pitt River Bridge, connecting Pitt Meadows with Port Coquitlam to the west, was completed in autumn 2009.

=== Public transportation ===
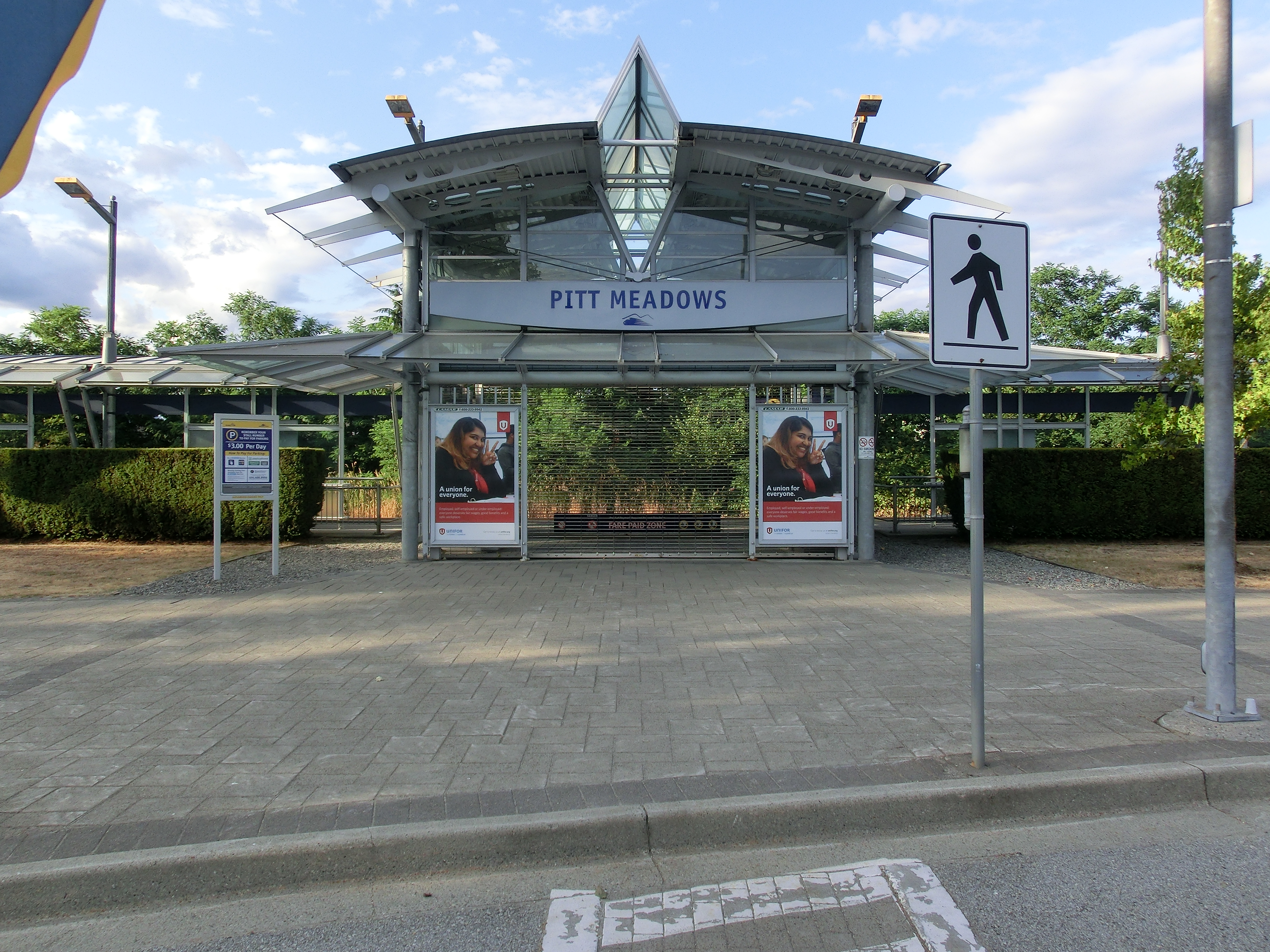
Pitt Meadows station

TransLink operates the West Coast Express with a stations at Maple Meadows and Pitt Meadows stations. Buses are operated by the Coast Mountain Bus Company, a subsidiary of TransLink. Route 701 is a major route that takes commuters from Coquitlam down to Port Coquitlam and into Pitt Meadows and Maple Ridge. Pitt Meadows is also served by the R3 Rapid Bus, although its route takes it along Lougheed Highway. Route 791 serves as another major route that takes commuters from Braid station to Pitt Meadows via the Mary Hill Bypass. The 722 and 719 community shuttle routes go from Osprey Village through different residential Pitt Meadows routes, both ending in Meadowtown Centre.

In 2018, a TransLink bus stop on Highway 7 (Lougheed Highway) in Pitt Meadows was voted the "sorriest bus stop in America" by StreetsBlog.

=== Accessibility ===
The Pitt Meadows Paddling Club received the 2011 Maple Ridge-Pitt Meadows Accessibility and Inclusion Award in both the Leisure and Recreation and the Volunteer Categories; the PaddleALL programs are for individuals with cognitive and physical disabilities. Access Transit provides accessible door-to-door transportation service in the Metro Vancouver region, which includes Pitt Meadows using specially equipped vehicles designed to carry passengers with physical or cognitive disabilities who are unable to use public transit without assistance.

== Economy ==
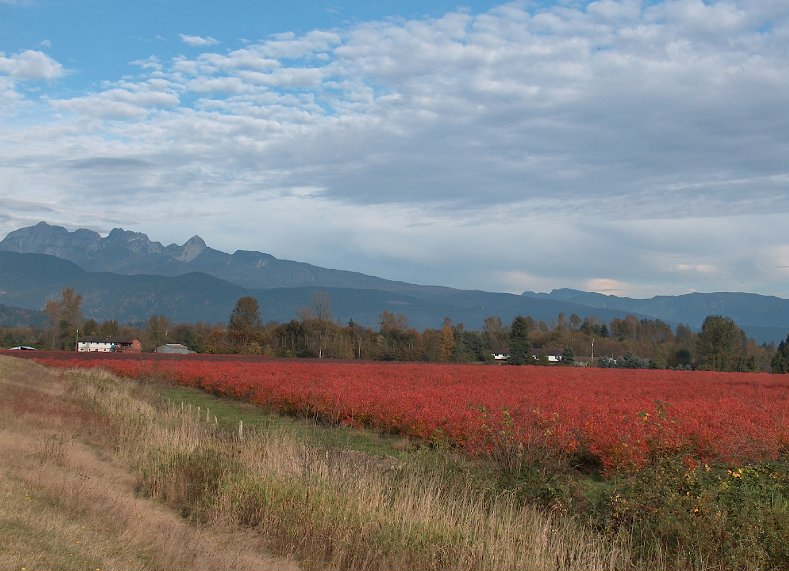
Pitt Meadows blueberry farms

As a primarily residential area, approximately 85% of Pitt Meadows residents commute to work beyond its borders. Within the community, the largest employment sectors are, in order of importance: Primary (20%); Education and Health (19%); Accommodation, Food, and Beverage (16%); and Construction (9%).

In addition to the commercial activity that already exists in Pitt Meadows, a new retail shopping centre, Meadowtown Centre, has been built on the border with Maple Ridge. Despite recent additions to its non-agricultural economy, 86% of the Pitt Meadows landmass is located within the province's Agricultural Land Reserve.

Pitt Meadows' agricultural lands includes extensive large parcels located in the southwest and northeast portions of the city. Major agricultural products include cranberry and blueberry farms, horticultural products, greenhouse crops (cut flowers and specialty peppers), grazing, dairy farming, and other farm activities. Agritourism is developed in conjunction with agricultural operations. The Meadows Maze, for example, one of the largest corn mazes in the Pacific Northwest is on the Hopcott Farm; which was purchased in 1932. A growing trend, particularly in areas close to urban centres, is the use of agricultural lands for rural estate use with little or no agricultural use of land.

== Politics ==
Pitt Meadows is represented by a mayor and six councillors. The mayor is Nicole MacDonald and the councillors are Tracy Elke, Alison Evans, Mike Hayes, Mike Manion, Bob Meachen and Gwen O'Connell. In 2017 former Pitt Meadows councillor David Murray was convicted for sexually assaulting a 14-year-old girl in 1992 while in his 30s. After conviction he resigned his position as councillor. He served 9 months in prison.

== Education ==
Pitt Meadows has one secondary school, and four elementary schools, all of which are part of School District 42 Maple Ridge-Pitt Meadows. Pitt Meadows Secondary School (PMSS) in particular is well known around the Fraser Valley and the Greater Vancouver Area for its soccer and hockey programs, some of which can be offered as an alternative to Physical Education. The school has enrolled around 800 students. PMSS has a Student Council which as of 2019 changed its logo to be a female marauder.

== Recreation ==
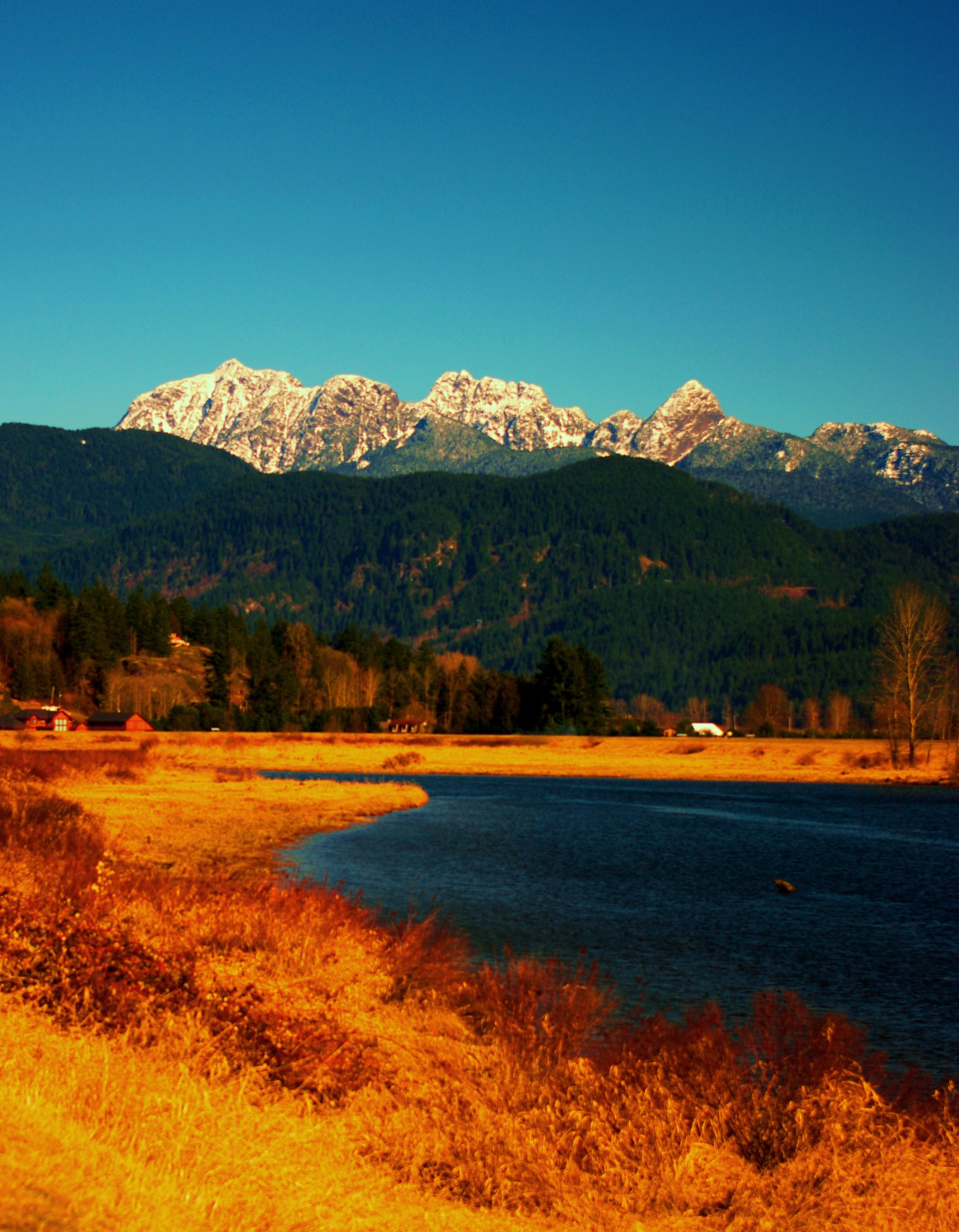
View of Golden Ears from Alouette River

In Pitt Meadows, there are cultural, recreation and other community facilities and public uses in the Civic Centre, the Town Centre and the Sawyer's Landing Waterfront Village. River access park areas provide active and passive use, parking, viewpoints and picnic use. There are public sports facilities, open spaces, trails and bike paths, protected natural areas and recreational programs. Indoor recreational facilities in Pitt Meadows include a recreation centre and ice skating rinks. Joint agreements with Maple Ridge and the School District allow the provision of community recreation facilities and programs to Pitt Meadows residents. Outdoor recreational opportunities include a system of dikes top trails along the river systems of Pitt Meadows for walking, cycling and equestrian use as well as boating opportunities on the Alouette, Fraser and Pitt Rivers.

The Widgeon Valley National Wildlife Area (NWA), which is 125 ha in size located near Pitt Lake, was purchased by the Nature Trust of British Columbia in 1973 and declared a NWA in October 1973. Nearby areas of high wetland value include Widgeon Slough and Addington Point along the Pitt River, the shallow southern end of Pitt Lake, and the extensive dyked wet areas of the Pitt Meadows. As a result, the valley is very attractive to wildlife and for human recreational pursuits.

== Notable residents ==
- Mike Kubat, writer
- Brendan Morrison, hockey player
- Molly Parker, actress
- Devin Townsend, musician

== TV and film ==
Much of the movie Happy Gilmore, including most of the golf course scenes, was filmed in Pitt Meadows at the Swan-e-set Bay Resort & Country Club. In the pilot episode of Smallville, the scene where the Porsche drives off the bridge was filmed at Silverbridge on Harris Road. The movie Duets starring Gwyneth Paltrow & Paul Giamatti had a scene filmed at the Ramada Inn on Lougheed Highway. The movie 3000 Miles to Graceland was filmed at a saw mill on Bonson Rd.
