= Pitt Meadows station =

Metro Vancouver commuter rail station

Pitt Meadows
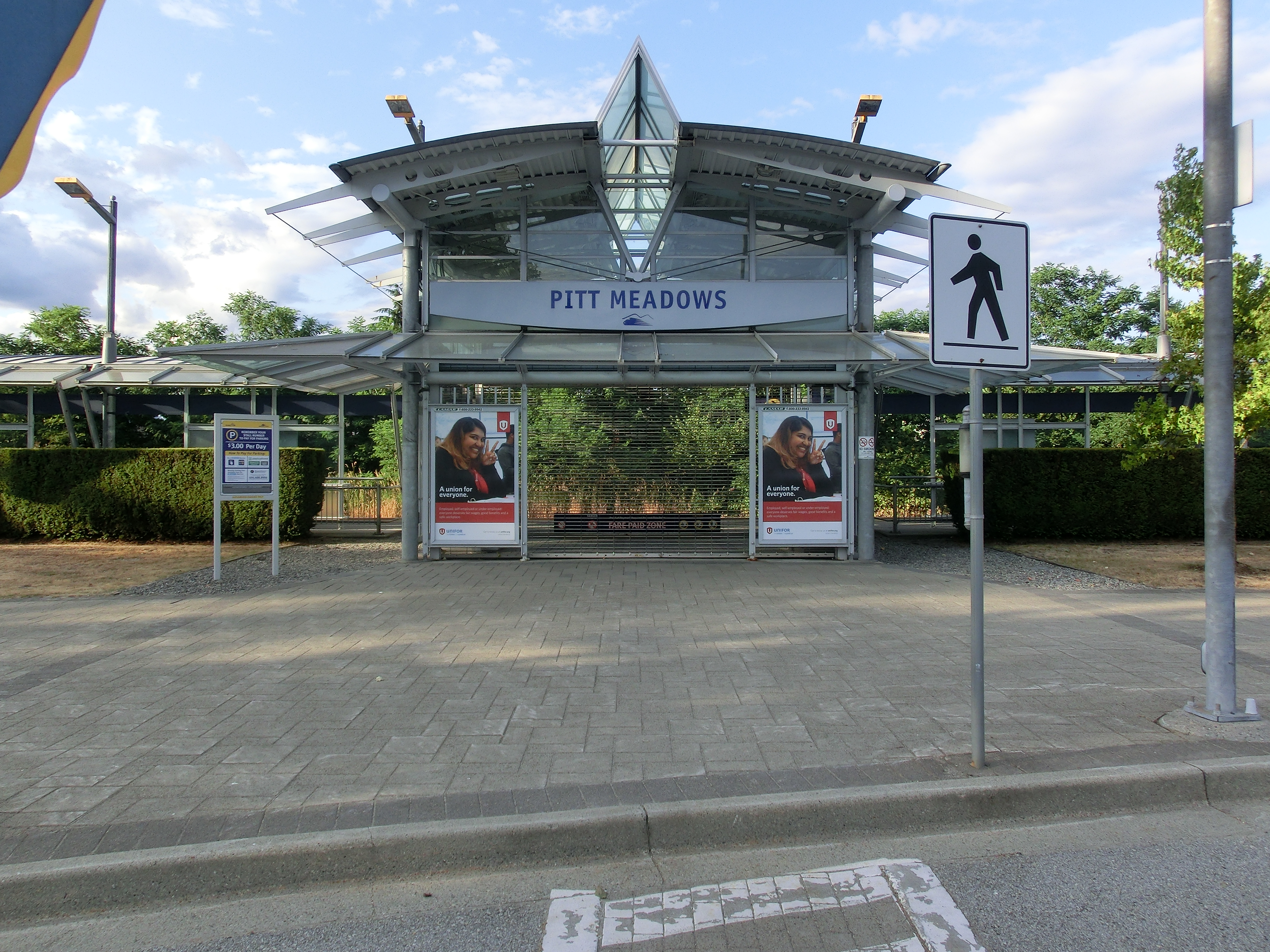

General information
- Location: 12280 Harris Rd, Pitt Meadows; Canada
- Coordinates: 49°13′33″N 122°41′18″W
- System: West Coast Express station
- Owner: BC Transit, TransLink
- Line: Canadian Pacific Railway
- Platforms: 1 side platform
- Tracks: 2
- Connections: TransLink

Construction
- Structure type: At grade
- Parking: 140 spaces
- Cycle facilities: lockers

Other information
- Fare zone: 4 (train), 3 (bus loop)

History
- Opened: 1995

Passengers
- 2019: 97,900 ▲0.4%
- Rank: 8 of 8

Services
Preceding station	TransLink	Following station
Port Coquitlam towards Waterfront	West Coast Express	Maple Meadows towards Mission City
Location

Pitt Meadows station is a stop on the West Coast Express commuter rail line connecting Vancouver to Mission, British Columbia, Canada. The station is located on the south side of the Canadian Pacific Railway (CPR) tracks in Pitt Meadows, just off Harris Road. The station opened in 1995, when the West Coast Express began operating. 140 park-and-ride spots are available. All services are operated by TransLink.

== Transit connections ==
Pitt Meadows is served by five West Coast Express trains per day in each direction: five in the morning to Vancouver, and five in the evening to Mission. The station is adjacent to a park-and-ride facility and bus loop.

Bay	Route number	Destination
1	(spare)	
2	HandyDART	
3	722	Meadowtown
