= Szakács =

Szakács is a Hungarian-language surname literally meaning "cook", i.e., it is an occupational surname. Notable people with this surname include:

- Györgyi Szakács (born 1951), Hungarian costume designer
- Imre Szakács (born 1957), Hungarian jurist
- Iosif Szakács (1934–2026), Romanian footballer
- Joe Szakacs, Australian politician and trade unionist
- Ludovic Szakács (1934–1998), Romanian footballer
- Péter Lajos Szakács, Hungarian politician
