= Port Haney station =

Metro Vancouver commuter rail station

Port Haney
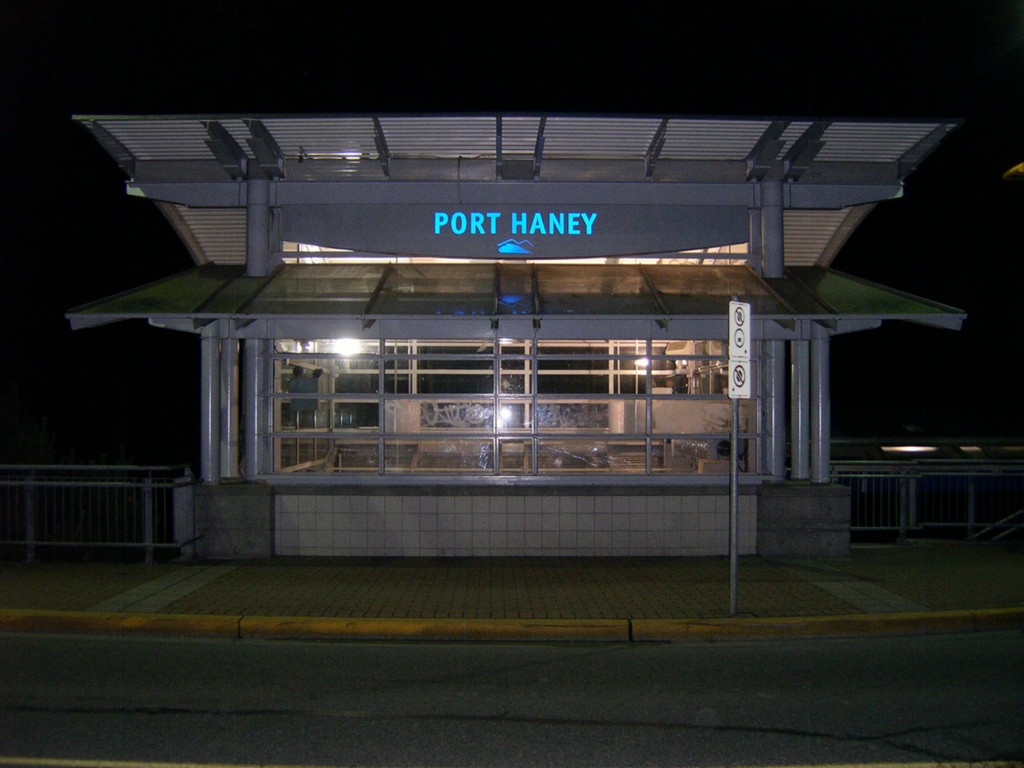

General information
- Location: 22300 River Rd, Maple Ridge; Canada
- Coordinates: 49°12′44″N 122°36′18.7″W
- System: West Coast Express station
- Owner: BC Transit, TransLink
- Line: Canadian Pacific Railway
- Platforms: 1 side platform
- Tracks: 2
- Connections: TransLink

Construction
- Structure type: At grade
- Parking: none
- Cycle facilities: locker

Other information
- Fare zone: 4 (train), 3 (bus loop)

History
- Opened: 1995

Passengers
- 2019: 130,700 ▲4.6%
- Rank: 7 of 8

Services
Preceding station	TransLink	Following station
Maple Meadows towards Waterfront	West Coast Express	Mission City Terminus
Location

Port Haney station is a commuter rail station served by the West Coast Express line which connects Vancouver and Mission in British Columbia, Canada. The station is located on the north side of the Canadian Pacific Railway (CPR) tracks in Maple Ridge, just off River Road and 223rd Street. The station opened in 1995, when the West Coast Express began operating. All services are operated by TransLink.

== Transit connections ==
Port Haney is served by five West Coast Express trains per day in each direction: five in the morning to Vancouver, and five in the evening to Mission. The station is served by bus connections travelling via River Road.

Bay	Route number	Destination
1	743	Meadowtown
2	745	Cottonwood (Note: Peak hour only)
2	746	Albion / Haney Place via Port Haney Station
2	748	Thornhill / Haney Place
3	733	Rock Ridge
3	741	Anderson Creek
3	743	Haney Place
