= Ludovic Szakács =

Romanian footballer (1934–1998)

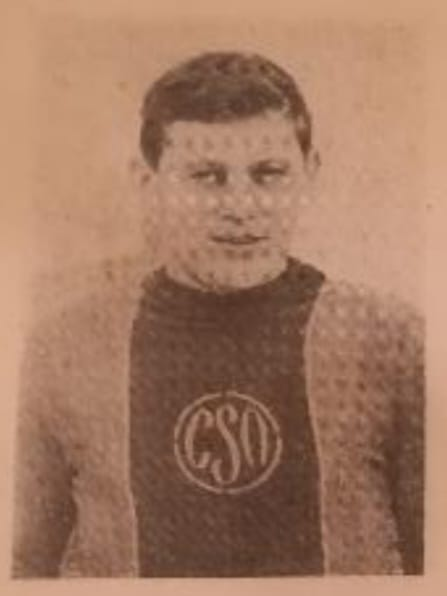
- Szakács in 1960

Personal information
- Date of birth: 30 October 1935
- Place of birth: Șimleu Silvaniei, Romania
- Date of death: 31 August 1998 (aged 62)
- Place of death: Oradea, Romania
- Height: 1.69 m (5 ft 7 in)
- Position: Defender

Youth career
- Șimleu Silvaniei

Senior career*
Years	Team	Apps	(Gls)
1954–1955	Progresul Oradea	18	(3)
1956–1958	Dinamo Brașov	28	(2)
1958–1959	Dinamo București	6	(0)
1960–1963	Crișana Oradea	64	(0)
1963–1966	Crișul Oradea	70	(0)
1966–1969	Olimpia Oradea	68	(0)
Total		254	(5)

Managerial career
- 1974–1976: Voința Oradea (assistant)
- * Club domestic league appearances and goals

Ludovic Szakács (also known as Ludovic Szakács II; 30 October 1935 – 31 August 1998) was a Romanian professional footballer and manager of Hungarian ethnicity. He grew up in Șimleu Silvaniei, then moved to Progresul Oradea in 1964. After Progresul, he moved to Dinamo Brașov, then to Dinamo București, where he played only six matches. In the second part of his career, Szakács II played for Crișana Oradea, Crișul Oradea and Olimpia Oradea in over 200 matches at the level of Divizia A, Divizia B and Divizia C.

His brother, Iosif Szakács (also known as Iosif Szakács I) was also a footballer. Szakács brothers played together for Dinamo Orașul Stalin, Dinamo București, Crișana Oradea and Olimpia Oradea.

Ludovic Szakács II died in August 1998 and a moment of silence was held before the match between FC Bihor and Dacia Pitești.

== Honours ==
Progresul Oradea

- Divizia B: 1955

Dinamo București

- Cupa României: 1959

Crișana Oradea

- Divizia B: 1961–62

Olimpia Oradea

- Divizia C: 1966–67
