= Meadowtown Centre =

Shopping mall in Pitt Meadows, British Columbia

Meadowtown Centre is a 39,000-square-metre (420,000 sq ft) power centre in Pitt Meadows, British Columbia.

== Anchors ==
- Real Canadian Superstore
- Winners
- Homesense
- Sport Chek
- Michael's
- Cineplex Odeon
- BC Liquor Store
- Reitmans
- Pier 1 Imports
- Jysk
- Tim Hortons
