= Maple Meadows station =

Metro Vancouver commuter rail station

Maple Meadows
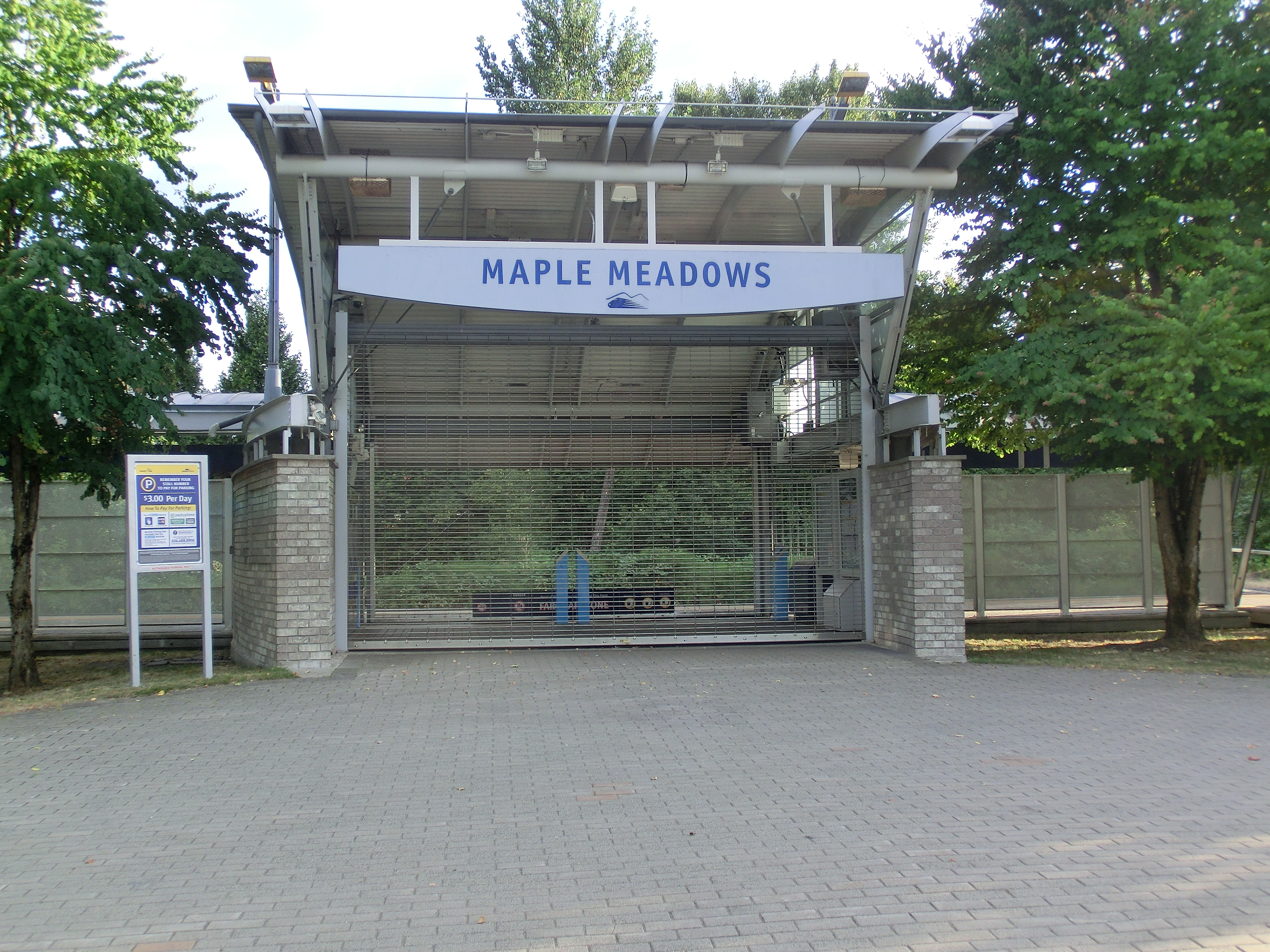

General information
- Location: 20010 Dunn Ave, Maple Ridge; Canada
- Coordinates: 49°12′59.5″N 122°39′58″W
- System: West Coast Express station
- Owner: TransLink
- Line: Canadian Pacific Railway
- Platforms: 1 side platform
- Tracks: 2
- Connections: TransLink

Construction
- Structure type: At grade
- Parking: 467 spaces
- Cycle facilities: lockers

Other information
- Fare zone: 4 (train), 3 (bus loop)

History
- Opened: 1995

Passengers
- 2019: 166,900 ▲2.1%
- Rank: 5 of 8

Services
Preceding station	TransLink	Following station
Pitt Meadows towards Waterfront	West Coast Express	Port Haney towards Mission City
Location

Maple Meadows station is a stop on the West Coast Express commuter rail line connecting Vancouver to Mission, British Columbia, Canada. The station is located on the north side of the Canadian Pacific Railway (CPR) tracks in Maple Ridge, just off Maple Meadows Way and Hammond Road. The station opened in 1995, when the West Coast Express began operating. 467 park and ride spaces are available. All services are operated by TransLink.

== Transit connections ==
Maple Meadows is served by five West Coast Express trains per day in each direction: five in the morning to Vancouver, and five in the evening to Mission. The station is adjacent to a bus loop and park-and-ride facility, which are served by the local and express bus and Community Shuttle minibus services.

Bay	Route number	Destination
1	719	Fraser Way (Note: No evening service)
1	743	Haney Place
1	744	Haney Place
2	701	Coquitlam Central
2	791	Braid station (Note: Express in Coquitlam and Port Coquitlam) (Note: Weekdays only)
3	701	Haney Place / Mission City station
3	791	Haney Place
4	595	Langley Centre / Ridge Meadows (Note: Peak hour only)
5	719	Meadowtown
5	743	Meadowtown
5	744	Meadowtown
