= 1959 Cupa României final =

- Event: 1958–59 Cupa României
Dinamo București	CSM Baia Mare
4	0
- Date: 14 June 1959
- Venue: 23 August, Bucharest
- Referee: Mihail Popa (Bucharest)
- Attendance: 40,000

The 1959 Cupa României final was the 21st final of Romania's most prestigious football cup competition. It was disputed between Dinamo București and CSM Baia Mare, and was won by Dinamo București after a game with four goals. It was the first cup for Dinamo București.

CSM Baia Mare was the sixth club representing Divizia B which reached the Romanian Cup final.

== Match details ==
14 June 1959
17:30 EET

Dinamo București	4–0	CSM Baia Mare
Szakács 30', 80', 90' (pen.); Anghel 57'	Report

23 August, Bucharest
Attendance: 40,000
Referee: Mihail Popa (Bucharest)

GK	1	(Romania) Iuliu Uțu
DF	2	(Romania) Cornel Popa
DF	3	(Romania) Valeriu Călinoiu
DF	4	(Romania) Nicolae Panait
MF	5	(Romania) Vasile Alexandru
MF	6	(Romania) Ion Nunweiller
FW	7	(Romania) Vasile Anghel
FW	8	(Romania) Iosif Varga
FW	9	(Romania) Alexandru Ene
FW	10	(Romania) Iosif Szakács
FW	11	(Romania) Ladislau Köszegi
Manager:
(Romania) Iuliu Baratky

GK	1	(Romania) Solomon Vlad II
DF	2	(Romania) Victor Mălăieru
DF	3	(Romania) Iosif Gergely I
DF	4	(Romania) Dumitru Vasilescu
MF	5	(Romania) László Gergely III (substituted off)
MF	6	(Romania) Adalbert Fehér
FW	7	(Romania) Elemer Sulyok
FW	8	(Romania) Paul Horzsa
FW	9	(Romania) Ernestin Drăgan
FW	10	(Romania) Ladislau Vlad
FW	11	(Romania) Vicenție Rusu
Substitutions:
MF	12	(Romania) Sulyok (substituted in)
Manager:
(Romania) Constantin Woronkowski

== See also ==
- List of Cupa României finals
