= West Coast Express =

Commuter railway in British Columbia

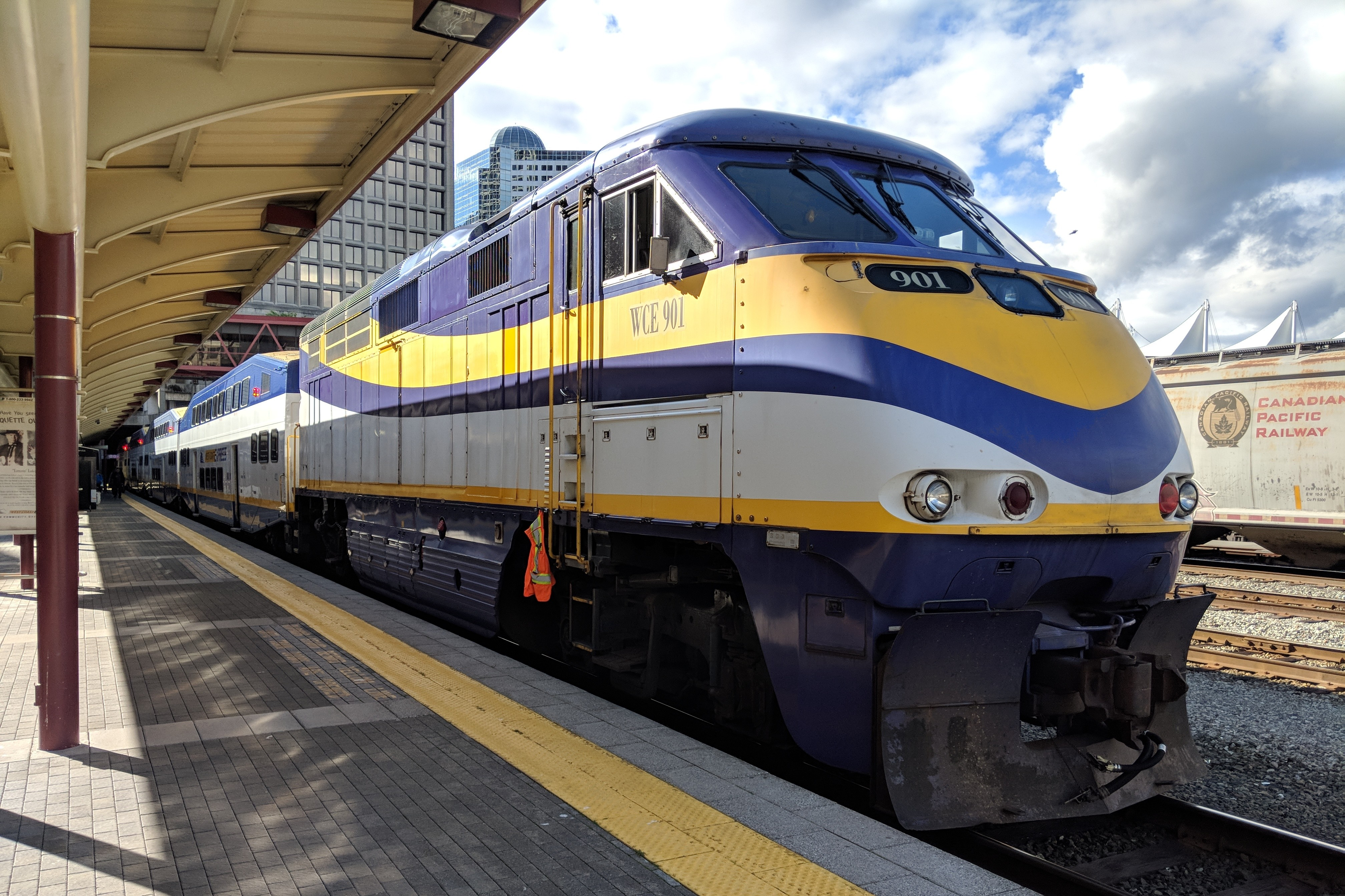
- West Coast Express train at Waterfront station, set to depart towards Mission

Overview
- Owner: TransLink (West Coast Express, Ltd.)
- Locale: Lower Mainland, British Columbia, Canada
- Stations: 8
- Website: Official website

Service
- Type: Commuter rail
- Operator: TransLink
- Daily ridership: 7,200 (weekdays, Q1 2026)
- Ridership: 1,734,200 (2025)

History
- Opened: November 1, 1995; 30 years ago

Technical
- Line length: 69 km (43 mi)
- Track gauge: 4 ft 8 1/2 in (1,435 mm) standard gauge
- Operating speed: 70 mph (110 km/h) (top)
Route map
West Coast Express highlighted in purple

The West Coast Express (reporting mark WCE) is a commuter railway serving the Lower Mainland region of British Columbia, Canada. It is owned and operated by the region's transit authority, TransLink. Opened in 1995, it provides a link between Metro Vancouver and the Fraser Valley Regional District and is the only commuter railway in Western Canada. In 2025, the system had a ridership of 1,734,200, or about 7,200 per weekday as of the first quarter of 2026.

Service is provided between Downtown Vancouver and the municipalities of Port Moody, Coquitlam, Port Coquitlam, Pitt Meadows, Maple Ridge, and Mission. Along its route, several stations interchange with the SkyTrain metropolitan rail system as well as local bus services. Additionally, Waterfront station in Downtown Vancouver provides a connection to the SeaBus passenger ferry.

== History ==
Service on the West Coast Express began on November 1, 1995, under the management of BC Transit. It was transferred to TransLink on April 1, 1999, the successor to BC Transit's operations in Greater Vancouver. In 1997, an onboard education program called the "Brain Train" was introduced; for a fee, passengers in a dedicated car would listen to weekly lectures from a Capilano College instructor in various subjects, including foreign languages and public speaking.

== Operation ==
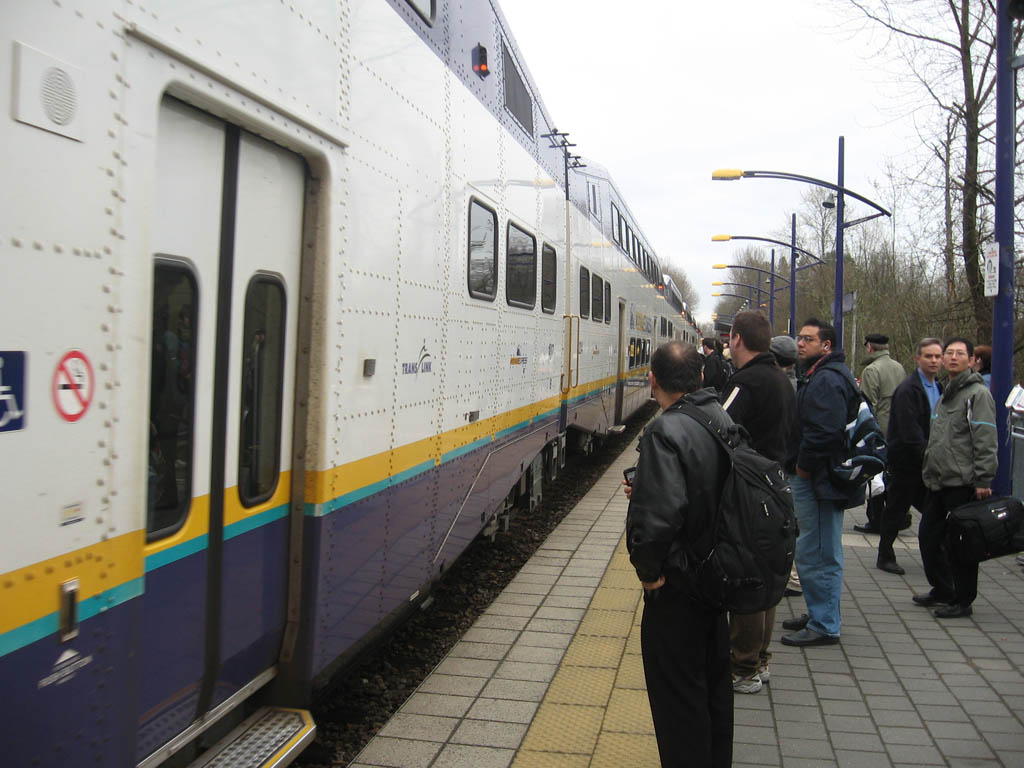
Passengers waiting to board at Coquitlam Central station

The West Coast Express operates from Monday to Friday (excluding holidays) with five trains per day running from Mission to Vancouver in the morning peak hours (5:25 am – 7:25 am) and returning to Mission in the evening peak (3:50 pm – 6:20 pm). A one-way trip takes 75 minutes, which is faster than driving to Downtown Vancouver.

The commuter railway is owned by TransLink, the transportation authority of the Metro Vancouver region. Metro Vancouver Transit Police officers and transit security officers conduct random fare inspections within the Fare Paid Zones at stations and on board trains. People caught without valid fare are removed from the train and may be fined $173. Contracted commissionaires provide station attendant services and a security presence, even checking fares on occasion at stations. Commissionaires do not conduct fare enforcement.

=== Supplementary bus service ===
Rail service is supplemented by TransLink's 701 bus route, which runs four eastbound and four westbound trips per weekday—one in the morning, one in the afternoon, and two in the evening—between Coquitlam Central station and Mission City station. As with the West Coast Express itself, this bus service does not run on weekends and holidays. TransLink's regular one-zone adult/concession fare rates apply to these trips. The eastbound bus makes regular stops until it reaches Haney Place Exchange in Maple Ridge and then runs non-stop for about 26 minutes to Mission City station. This process is reversed for westbound buses. The entire one-way route is completed in 60 to 70 minutes.

=== Prior services ===
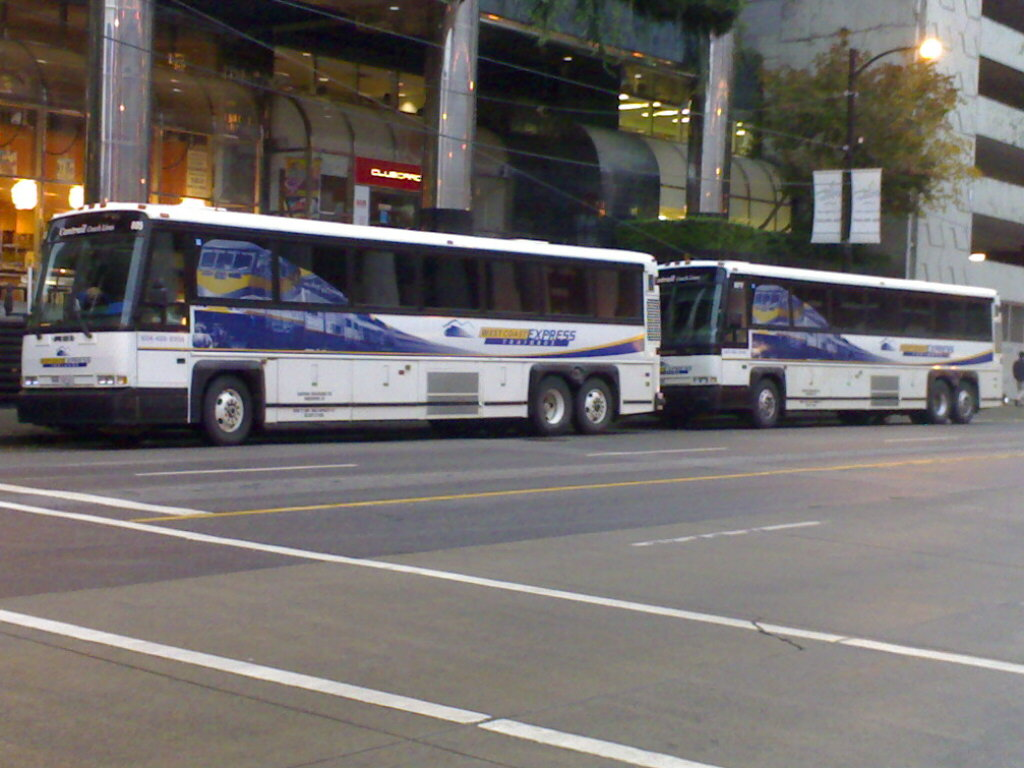
"TrainBuses" at Waterfront station

Until December 30, 2016, the West Coast Express ran coach-style "TrainBus" service, which provided additional service when trains were not running. The TrainBus service provided two buses, one from Port Haney station in Maple Ridge and one from Mission City station, to Vancouver in the morning (after all westbound trains had departed) and five buses eastbound (two mid-day, and three after all eastbound trains had departed Waterfront), three of which extended to Mission, stopping only at West Coast Express stations. This service was replaced by the 701 bus service.

== Map ==
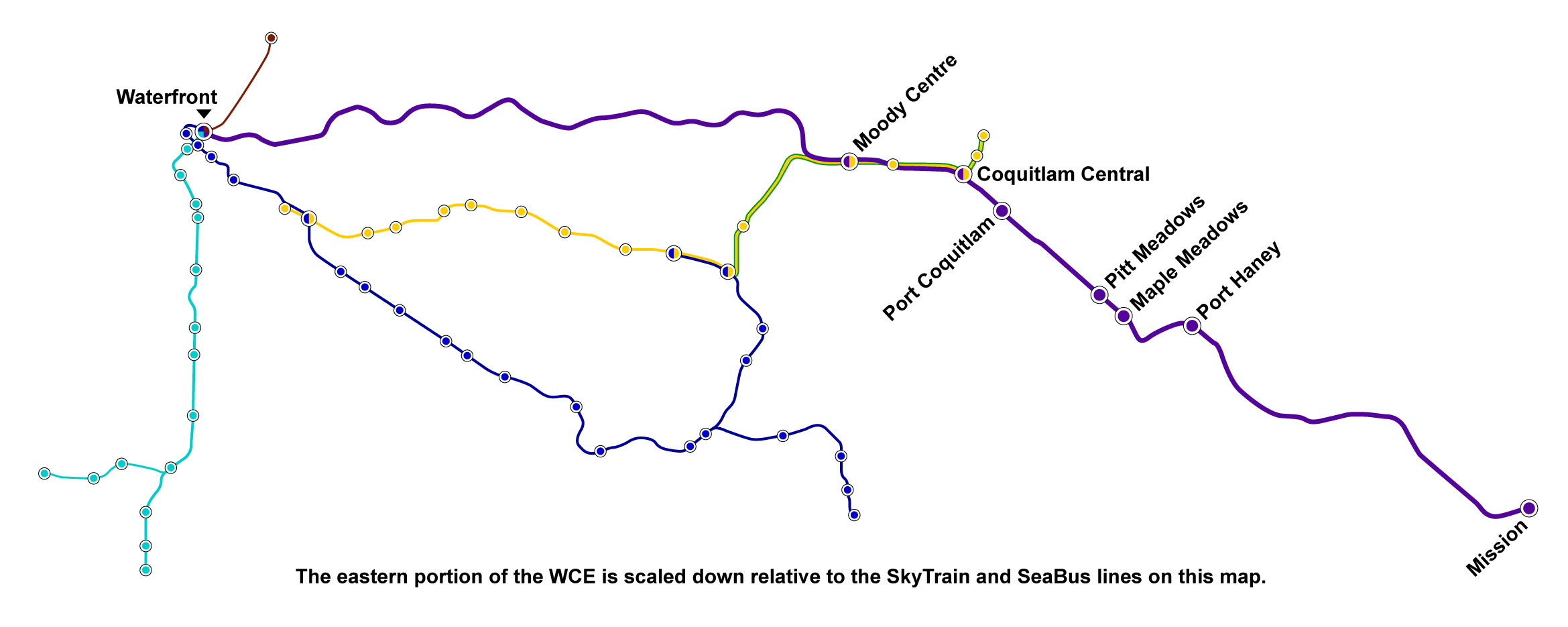
TransLink major network lines as of late 2016

=== Legend ===
- West Coast Express route and stops
- Expo Line (runs from Waterfront to King George with a branch northeast after Columbia to Production Way–University)
- Millennium Line (runs from VCC–Clark to Lafarge Lake–Douglas, interlined with the Expo Line at Production Way–University and Lougheed Town Centre)
- SeaBus
- Canada Line (runs from Waterfront to Richmond-Brighouse and YVR-Airport)

== Stations ==
| Station | Municipality | Zone | Year | Connection(s) |
|---|---|---|---|---|
| Mission City | Mission | Zone 5 | 1995 | CFV buses |
| Port Haney | Maple Ridge | Zone 4 | 1995 | |
| Maple Meadows | Maple Ridge | Zone 4 | 1995 | |
| Pitt Meadows | Pitt Meadows | Zone 4 | 1995 | |
| Port Coquitlam | Port Coquitlam | Zone 3 | 1995 | |
| Coquitlam Central | Coquitlam | Zone 3 | 1995 | Millennium Line; R3 Lougheed Hwy |
| Moody Centre | Port Moody | Zone 3 | 2016 (Note: The West Coast Express previously served Port Moody station, opened in 1995 along with the rest of the West Coast Express stations, in Port Moody. It was replaced in 2016 by Moody Centre station.) | Millennium Line |
| Waterfront | Vancouver | Zone 1 | 1995 | Expo Line; Canada Line; SeaBus; R5 Hastings St |

== Ridership ==
West Coast Express ridership by year
| Year | 2016 | 2017 | 2018 | 2019 | 2020 |
|---|---|---|---|---|---|
| Trips (millions) | 2.5 | 2.3 | 2.5 | 2.6 | 0.8 (Note: Represents a significant ridership decrease from prior years owing to the impact of the COVID-19 pandemic on public transport.) |
View chart definition.

TransLink ridership by mode, 2024
| Mode | Trips | % of total | View chart definition. |
| SkyTrain | 149,066,500 | 37.00 | View chart definition. |
| West Coast Express | 1,559,100 | 0.39 | View chart definition. |
| SeaBus | 5,398,900 | 1.34 | View chart definition. |
| Bus | 246,877,500 | 61.30 | View chart definition. |
| Total | 402,902,000 (Note: Represents a significant ridership decrease compared to pre-2020 levels owing to the impact of the COVID-19 pandemic on public transport.) | 100.00 | View chart definition. |

== Fares ==
Use of the Compass Card on the West Coast Express began on June 8, 2015, along with new card vending machines. Existing paper fares were honoured until July 24, 2015.

West Coast Express fares can also be used as a three-zone fare on other TransLink services. A one-way fare expires 120 minutes from the time of purchase; all other fares work as an all-day pass. See TransLink Fares for more information on the pricing of the West Coast Express' fares.

As of July 1, 2026, the lowest adult fare is $6.95 for one or two zones traveled excluding Waterfront station and $9.05 for three zones including Waterfront station. A discount is available for Compass Card users, who are also able to load return and monthly passes.

== Rolling stock ==
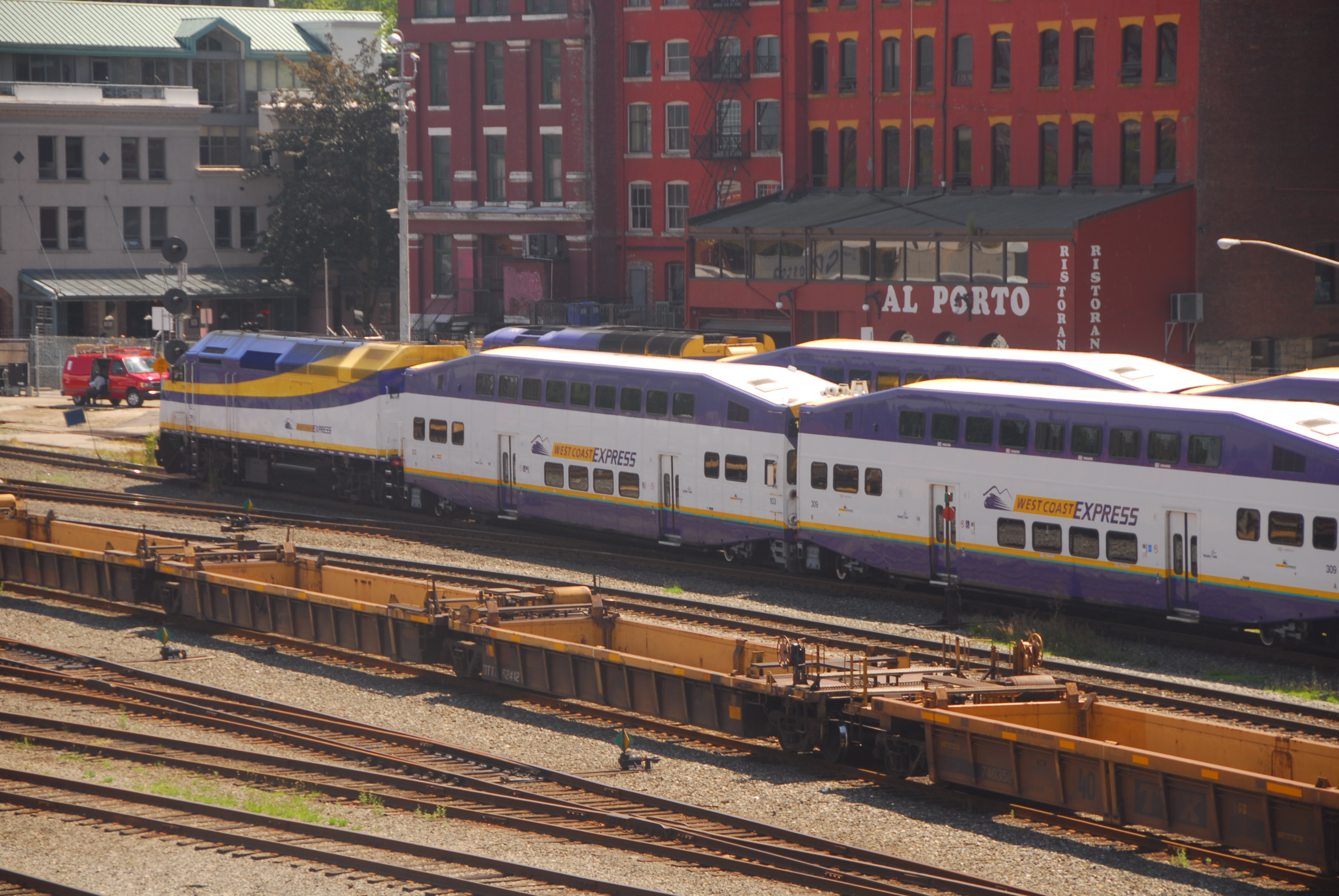
Bi-level coaches at Waterfront station

| Type | Manufacturer | Model | Units | Notes |
|---|---|---|---|---|
| Locomotive | Electro-Motive Diesel | F59PHI | 5 | Nos. 901–905 |
| Locomotive | MotivePowerIndustries | MP36PH-3C | 1 | No. 906; backup unit, arrived in December 2006. |
| Locomotive | Electro-Motive Diesel | F59PH | 1 | No. 907; backup unit, former GO Transit Locomotive 533, former Larry's Truck Electric 18533, arrived in May 2023. |
| Rail coach | Bombardier | BiLevel coach VI | 44 | 37 original units, 7 added in 2010 |

Each train consists of a General Motors/ EMD F59PHI diesel-electric locomotive and between four and ten Bombardier BiLevel passenger coaches. The West Coast Express also operates an MPI MP36PH-3C and EMD F59PH for backup. The total fleet of passenger coaches numbers 44. Each passenger carriage has a seating capacity of 144 people. Like many commuter railways, the West Coast Express uses push–pull operation; instead of moving the locomotive to the other end of the train, it is controlled remotely from a second cab in the last passenger carriage, allowing the train to run 'backwards'; this occurs during mornings, as during afternoons the locomotive is at the front of train. Passenger amenities include washrooms, power outlets, wheelchair accessibility and space for bicycles.

The coaches and locomotives are maintained by Via Rail and, under the contract, operated by Alstom Transport Canada (formerly Bombardier Transportation) over tracks which belong to the Canadian Pacific Railway. Bombardier began a contract to operate the trains for the next five years, commencing on May 5, 2014. After May 2014, track time is negotiated between TransLink and the Canadian Pacific Railway, which balances the use by the West Coast Express with its mainstay freight operation.

== Future plans ==
TransLink's 2009 capital plan included upgrades to the Waterfront and Mission stations, and platform extensions to handle longer trains. In the 2009 10-Year Plan, TransLink also proposed a number of other improvements to West Coast Express service, some of the key improvements being:

- Upgrades to Port Haney station passenger drop-off
- Park and ride expansion at Maple Meadows station

The company committed to maintaining the 2011 service levels to 2014. TransLink has been criticized for the low ridership of the West Coast Express and supports its expansion.

A 20-year service agreement between TransLink and the Canadian Pacific Railroad to operate the West Coast Express expired in 2015. Negotiations for renewal were initiated within the time period covered by this Base Plan. A fuller understanding of the future interaction of the service with the Evergreen Line is required, as well as an understanding of the overall market for long distance travel in the corridor. Accordingly, TransLink initiated the development of a West Coast Express Strategy in 2011 to consult with stakeholders and examine the issues. Completion of the strategy is expected in 2012, with subsequent implementation work expected to identify appropriate future service and infrastructure requirements.

A proposal in the 2009 10-Year Plan for a new station in Albion did not appear in the 2012 ten-year plan. Plans for a new station in northern Burnaby to service Simon Fraser University have been indefinitely postponed.

In 2021, the federal and provincial governments announced an upgrade program to extend the life of six of the seven locomotives used for the West Coast Express, with additional upgrades to improve efficiency and allow the future operation of longer trains. The upgrades are expected to be completed by 2026.
