= Maple Meadow, West Virginia =

Maple Meadow
- Unincorporated community
- Location within the state of West Virginia Maple Meadow (the United States)
- Coordinates: 37°44′28″N 81°20′40″W
- Country: United States
- State: West Virginia
- County: Raleigh
- Elevation: 1,929 ft (588 m)
- Time zone: UTC-5 (Eastern (EST))
  - Summer (DST): UTC-4 (EDT)
- GNIS ID: 1549805

Maple Meadow is an unincorporated community in Raleigh County, West Virginia, United States.
