= Iosif Szakács =

Romanian footballer (1934–2026)

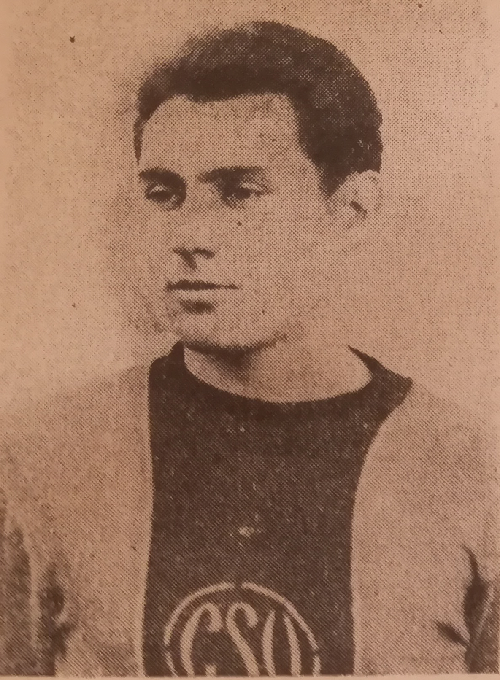
- Szakács in 1960

Personal information
- Date of birth: 25 January 1934
- Place of birth: Șimleu Silvaniei, Romania
- Date of death: 1 February 2026 (aged 92)
- Height: 1.72 m (5 ft 8 in)
- Position: Midfielder

Youth career
- Șimleu Silvaniei

Senior career*
Years	Team	Apps	(Gls)
1952–1954	Flamura Roșie Arad	14	(0)
1955–1958	Dinamo Orașul Stalin	33	(6)
1958–1960	Dinamo București	23	(7)
1960–1963	Crișana Oradea	59	(9)
1963–1964	Flamura Roșie Oradea		
1964–1967	Olimpia Oradea	24	(0)
Total		153	(22)
- * Club domestic league appearances and goals

Iosif Szakács (also known as Iosif Szakács I; 25 January 1934 – 1 February 2026) was a Romanian professional football player and manager. He grew up in Șimleu Silvaniei, then moved to Flamura Roșie Arad where he won the Romanian title in 1954. After Flamura Roșie, he moved to Dinamo Brașov, then to Dinamo București, where in 23 matches he scored 7 goals. Szakács I scored three goals in a 4–0 victory against CSM Baia Mare in the 1959 Cupa României final, helping Dinamo București win the first Cupa României trophy in the club's history. In the last part of his career, Szakács I played for Crișana Oradea, Flmaura Roșie Oradea and Olimpia Oradea.

His brother, Ludovic Szakács (also known as Ludovic Szakács II) was also a footballer. The Szakács brothers played together for Dinamo Brașov, Dinamo București, Crișana Oradea and Olimpia Oradea.

Szakács died on 1 February 2026, at the age of 92.

== Honours ==
Flamura Roșie Arad

- Divizia A: 1954
- Cupa României: 1953

Dinamo București

- Cupa României: 1959

Crișana Oradea

- Divizia B: 1961–62

Olimpia Oradea

- Divizia C: 1966–67
