= Marcel Sakáč =

Slovak ice hockey player

- Born: 29 May 1972 (age 54) Bratislava, Czechoslovakia
- Position: Centre
- Slovak Extraliga team: HC Slovan Bratislava

Marcel Sakáč (born 29 May 1972) is a Slovak former professional ice hockey player who played as a centre with HC Slovan Bratislava in the Slovak Extraliga as well as in Germany and brief spells in Italy, Austria and Sweden.

His father of the same name, a goaltender, played for the same club and won two IIHF World Championships with Czechoslovakia in the 1970s.
