= Mission City station =

Metro Vancouver commuter rail station

Mission City
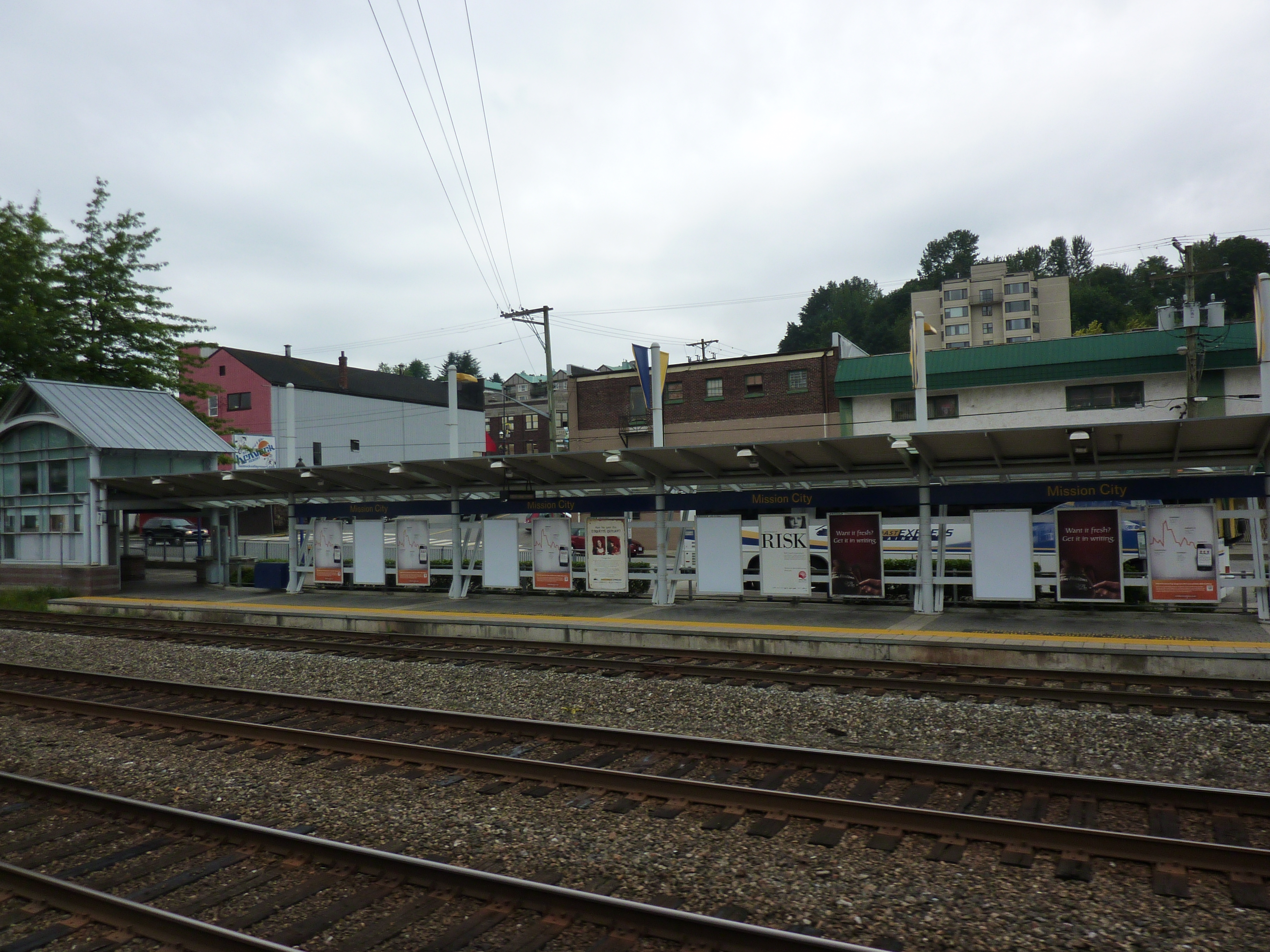

General information
- Location: 33200 North Railway Avenue; Mission, British Columbia; Canada
- Coordinates: 49°08′01″N 122°18′14″W
- System: West Coast Express station
- Owner: BC Transit, TransLink
- Line: Canadian Pacific Railway
- Platforms: 1 side platform
- Tracks: 3
- Connections: BC Transit: 31 Valley Connector; 32 West Heights; 33 Cedar Valley; 34 East Side; 35 Hatzic; 39 Shopper Shuttle

Construction
- Structure type: At grade
- Parking: 254
- Cycle facilities: Yes; bicycle lockers

Other information
- Fare zone: 5 (train only)

History
- Opened: November 1, 1995; 30 years ago

Passengers
- 2019: 135,000 ▲3.9%
- Rank: 6 of 8

Services
Preceding station	TransLink	Following station
Port Haney towards Waterfront	West Coast Express	Terminus
Former services at Mission station
Preceding station	Canadian Pacific Railway	Following station
Silverdale toward Vancouver	Main Line	Hatzic toward Montreal Windsor
Terminus	Mission – Huntingdon	Matsqui toward Huntingdon
Location

Mission City is the eastern terminus station on the West Coast Express commuter rail line connecting Vancouver to Mission, British Columbia, Canada. The station is located on the north side of the Canadian Pacific Railway (CPR) tracks in Mission on North Railway Avenue. The station opened in 1995, when the West Coast Express began operating. 254 park and ride spaces are available at the station.

== History ==
The first Mission City CPR station was built in 1882, at a site near St. Mary's Mission, further to the east. Subsequent railway stations were located at Mission City Junction on the western end of Railway Avenue, at the foot of Grand Street, slightly to the west of the current commuter rail station. First station at the junction was in 1885 and a second railway station was built in 1892 in the "Y" of the tracks. The most recent 1909 CPR station building, which had been recognized as a municipal historic site in 1982, was destroyed by fire in 1999.

Canadian National Railway and Canadian Pacific Railway have a track sharing agreement, with all freight trains operating eastbound through the station on the CPR tracks.

== Services ==
Mission City is served by five West Coast Express trains per day in each direction: five in the morning to Vancouver, and five in the evening to Mission. In addition, rail service is supplemented by TransLink's 701 bus route. Eight of its daily trips (two in the morning, two in the afternoon, and four in the evening), are extended between Coquitlam Central station and Mission City station, running non-stop between Haney Place Exchange and Mission City station. Service does not run on weekends.

== Bus routes ==
Bus bay assignments are as follows:

Bay	Route	Notes
BC Transit	31 Valley Connector	
BC Transit	32 West Heights	
BC Transit	33 Cedar Valley	
BC Transit	34 East Side	
BC Transit	35 Hatzic	
BC Transit	39 Shopper Shuttle	
TransLink; Stop number 60979	701 Coquitlam Central Station	Limited express service on weekdays only when West Coast Express service not operating
TransLink; Stop number 61213	—	HandyDART service
