= List of FC Dinamo București seasons =

Dinamo București is a Romanian association football club based in Bucharest. The club was founded in 1948.

Dinamo is one of the two most successful football teams in Romania, having won 18 Romanian Liga I titles, 13 Romanian Cups and 2 Romanian Supercups. They became the first Romanian team to reach the European Champions' Cup semifinals in 1983–84.

As of the end of the 2025–26 season, the team have spent 76 seasons in the top tier of the Romanian football league system and one in the second tier. The table details the team's achievements and the top goalscorer in senior first-team competitions from their first season in 1948–49 to the end of the most recently completed season.

== Key ==
- P = Games played
- W = Games won
- D = Games drawn
- L = Games lost
- F = Goals for
- A = Goals against
- Pts = Points
- Pos = Final position
- QR = Qualifying Round
- R32 = Round of 32
- R16 = Round of 16
- R1 = Round 1
- R2 = Round 2
- R3 = Round 3
- R4 = Round 4
- R5 = Round 5
- R6 = Round 6
- Grp = Group stage
- QF = Quarter-finals
- SF = Semi-finals

Champions	Runners-up	Relegated ↓	Promoted ↑	Top scorer in Dinamo's division ♦

== Seasons ==
Correct as of the end of the 2024–25 season. For information on the season in progress, see 2025–26 FC Dinamo București season.

Seasons of FC Dinamo București
Season	Division	P	W	D	L	F	A	Pts	Pos	Cupa României	Other competitions	European presence	Name	Goals	Source
Season	League									Cupa României	Other competitions	European presence	Top scorer		Source
1948–49	CategoriaA	26	11	6	9	55	50	28	8th	R32	—	—	Carol Bartha	13	
1950	CategoriaA	22	9	3	10	40	45	21	8th	QF	—	—	Constantin Popescu	14	
1951	CategoriaA	22	14	4	4	52	29	32	2nd	R16	—	—	Constantin Popescu	11	
1952	CategoriaA	22	14	6	2	51	23	34	2nd	SF	—	—	Titus Ozon	17	
1953	CategoriaA	21	10	5	6	37	29	25	2nd	QF	—	—	Titus Ozon	13	
1954	CategoriaA	26	12	9	5	62	36	33	3rd	Runners-up	—	—	Alexandru Ene	20	
1955	CategoriaA	24	15	7	2	42	19	37	1st	SF	—	—	Alexandru Ene	14	
1956	CategoriaA	24	13	3	8	48	34	29	2nd	R16	—	EC; R16	Alexandru Ene	17	
1957–58	CategoriaA	22	10	4	8	33	26	24	6th	R32	—	—	Alexandru Ene	7	
1958–59	CategoriaA	22	13	4	5	47	27	30	2nd	Winners	—	—	Alexandru Ene	8	
1959–60	CategoriaA	22	6	9	7	29	29	21	8th	QF	—	—	Alexandru Ene	6	
1960–61	CategoriaA	26	14	4	8	56	31	32	2nd	R32	—	—	Gheorghe Ene	15	
1961–62	CategoriaA	26	14	8	4	62	35	36	1st	R16	—	—	Gheorghe Ene	19	
1962–63	CategoriaA	27	14	9	4	46	25	37	1st	QF	—	EC; QR	Constantin Frățilă	9	
1963–64	CategoriaA	26	18	4	4	65	25	40	1st	Winners	—	EC; R16	Constantin Frățilă	20	
1964–65	CategoriaA	26	17	4	5	56	22	38	1st	SF	—	EC; R16	Gheorghe Ene	15	
1965–66	CategoriaA	26	10	8	8	45	33	28	3rd	QF	—	EC; R16	Gheorghe Ene	15	
1966–67	CategoriaA	26	13	6	7	38	23	32	2nd	R16	—	—	Constantin Frățilă	8	
1967–68	DiviziaA	26	13	5	8	34	31	31	3rd	Winners	—	—	Florea Dumitrache	6	
1968–69	DiviziaA	30	15	5	10	55	33	35	2nd	Runners-up	—	CWC; R16	Florea Dumitrache	22	
1969–70	DiviziaA	30	14	4	12	51	41	32	5th	Runners-up	—	—	Florea Dumitrache	13	
1970–71	DiviziaA	30	13	10	7	49	31	36	1st	Runners-up	—	ICFC; R32	Florea Dumitrache	15	
1971–72	DiviziaA	30	12	7	11	46	36	31	7th	SF	—	EC; R16	Doru Popescu	5	
1972–73	DiviziaA	30	17	5	8	51	32	39	1st	R16	—	—	Florea Dumitrache	15	
1973–74	DiviziaA	34	18	8	8	60	34	44	2nd	R32	—	EC; R16	Dudu Georgescu	21	
1974–75	DiviziaA	34	19	5	10	63	37	43	1st	R32	—	UEFA Cup; R32	Dudu Georgescu	33	
1975–76	DiviziaA	34	18	8	8	68	35	44	2nd	R32	—	EC; R32	Dudu Georgescu	31	
1976–77	DiviziaA	34	20	9	5	84	34	49	1st	R32	—	UEFA Cup; R64	Dudu Georgescu	47	
1977–78	DiviziaA	34	15	6	13	50	40	36	5th	QF	—	EC; R32	Dudu Georgescu	24	
1978–79	DiviziaA	34	16	9	9	51	28	41	2nd	SF	—	—	Dudu Georgescu	13	
1979–80	DiviziaA	34	14	9	11	50	37	37	5th	R32	—	UEFA Cup; R32	Ionel Augustin	10	
1980–81	DiviziaA	34	18	7	9	57	34	43	2nd	R32	—	—	Ionel Augustin	9	
1981–82	DiviziaA	34	20	7	7	62	31	47	1st	Winners	—	UEFA Cup; R16	Dudu Georgescu	11	
1982–83	DiviziaA	34	17	15	2	62	25	49	1st	SF	—	EC; R16	Ionel Augustin	14	
1983–84	DiviziaA	34	19	11	4	69	36	49	1st	Winners	—	EC; SF	Ionel Augustin	17	
1984–85	DiviziaA	34	21	10	3	59	31	52	2nd	SF	—	EC; R16	Marin Dragnea	11	
1985–86	DiviziaA	34	20	6	8	49	27	46	4th	Winners	—	UEFA Cup; R64	Costel Orac	7	
1986–87	DiviziaA	34	17	10	7	84	46	44	2nd	Runners-up	—	CWC; R32	Rodion Cămătaru	44	
1987–88	DiviziaA	34	30	3	1	107	25	63	2nd	Runners-up	—	CWC; R32	Claudiu Vaişcovici	27	
1988–89	DiviziaA	34	30	2	2	130	30	62	2nd	Runners-up	—	CWC; QF	Dorin Mateuț	43	
1989–90	DiviziaA	34	26	5	3	96	23	57	1st	Winners	—	CWC; SF	Florin Răducioiu Claudiu Vaișcovici	14	
1990–91	DiviziaA	34	16	11	7	54	27	43	3rd	QF	—	EC; R16	Marian Damaschin	15	
1991–92	DiviziaA	34	21	13	0	76	23	55	1st	R16	—	UEFA Cup; R32	Gábor Gerstenmájer	21	
1992–93	Divizia Națională	34	23	7	4	81	24	53	2nd	R16	—	UCL; R16	Dorinel Munteanu	15	
1993–94	Divizia Națională	34	16	7	11	65	40	39	3rd	QF	—	UEFA Cup; R64	Marian Savu	12	
1994–95	Divizia Națională	34	20	5	9	61	35	65	3rd	R16	—	—	Gheorghe Ceaușilă Viorel Moldovan	6	
1995–96	Divizia Națională	34	15	7	12	40	37	52	5th	QF	—	UEFA Cup; QR	Ionel Dănciulescu	14	
1996–97	Divizia Națională	34	18	5	11	56	34	59	3rd	SF	—	—	Ionel Dănciulescu Adrian Mihalcea	8	
1997–98	DiviziaA	34	17	3	14	66	50	54	6th	SF	—	UEFA Cup; QR	Adrian Mihalcea	11	
1998–99	DiviziaA	34	26	4	4	95	27	82	2nd	SF	—	—	Adrian Mihalcea	18	
1999–00	DiviziaA	34	27	3	4	93	40	84	1st	Winners	—	UEFA Cup; QR	Adrian Mutu	18	
2000–01	DiviziaA	30	15	6	9	56	44	51	2nd	Winners	—	UCL; QR	Marius Niculae	20	
2001–02	DiviziaA	30	17	9	4	63	33	60	1st	Runners-up	SC; Runners-up	UEFA Cup; R128	Claudiu Niculescu	15	
2002–03	DiviziaA	30	13	5	12	49	46	44	6th	Winners	SC; Runners-up	UCL; QR	Ionel Dănciulescu	16	
2003–04	DiviziaA	30	22	4	4	71	30	70	1st	Winners	SC; Runners-up	UCL; R64	Ionel Dănciulescu	21	
2004–05	DiviziaA	30	20	2	8	60	30	62	2nd	Winners	—	UCL; QR; UEFA Cup; R1	Claudiu Niculescu	21	
2005–06	DiviziaA	30	17	5	8	56	32	56	3rd	R16	SC; Winners	UEFA Cup; Grp	Claudiu Niculescu	12	
2006–07	LigaI	34	23	8	3	63	24	77	1st	R16	—	UEFA Cup; R32	Claudiu Niculescu	18	
2007–08	LigaI	34	17	10	7	55	36	61	4th	QF	SC; Runners-up	UCL; QR; UEFA Cup; R1	Ionel Dănciulescu	21	
2008–09	LigaI	34	20	5	9	56	30	65	3rd	SF	—	UEFA Cup; R1	Ionel Dănciulescu Marius Niculae	12	
2009–10	LigaI	34	13	14	7	48	37	53	6th	SF	—	UEL; Grp	Andrei Cristea	16	
2010–11	LigaI	34	16	8	10	68	52	56	6th	Runners-up	—	UEL; QR	Gabriel Torje	9	
2011–12	LigaI	34	18	8	8	57	32	62	5th	Winners	—	UEL; QR	Marius Niculae	19	
2012–13	LigaI	34	16	8	10	48	40	56	6th	QF	SC; Winners	UEL; QR	Marius Alexe	15	
2013–14	LigaI	34	17	8	9	52	34	59	4th	SF	—	—	Cosmin Matei	8	
2014–15	LigaI	34	13	9	12	47	44	48	7th	R16	LC; SF	—	Kamil Biliński	11	
2015–16	LigaI	36	15	15	6	48	39	36	4th	Runners-up	LC; SF	—	Harlem Gnohéré	12	
2016–17	LigaI	36	17	9	10	48	55	40	3rd	QF	LC; Winners	—	Adam Nemec	11	
2017–18	LigaI	40	22	7	11	68	41	54	7th	QF	—	UEL; QR	Diogo Salomão	9	
2018–19	LigaI	40	16	11	13	45	44	43	9th	R16	—	—	Mattia Montini	13	
2019–20	LigaI	34	12	5	17	44	51	25	13th	SF	—	—	Deian Sorescu	10	
2020–21	LigaI	39	12	8	19	37	49	44	12th	SF	—	—	Deian Sorescu	8	
2021–22	LigaI ↓	39	8	7	24	38	77	31	14th* (Note: Dinamo were defeated 3–1 on aggregate in the Promotion/relegation play-offs by Universitatea Cluj.)	R16	—	—	Deian Sorescu	8	
2022–23	LigaII ↑	29	13	7	9	43	30	46	4th* (Note: Dinamo won 8–5 on aggregate in the 2022–23 Liga II#Liga I promotion/relegation play-offs against FC Argeș.)	Grp	—	—	Lamine Ghezali	13	
2023–24	SuperLiga	39	10	9	20	32	53	39	13th (Note: Dinamo won 2–0 on aggregate in the 2023–24 Liga II#Liga I promotion/relegation play-offs against Csíkszereda Miercurea Ciuc.)	Grp	—	—	Gonçalo Gregório	7	
2024–25	SuperLiga	40	14	14	12	51	45	56	6th	Grp	—	—	Astrit Selmani	14	
2025–26	SuperLiga	40	17	14	9	55	40	65	4th	SF	—	—	Alexandru Musi Cătălin Cîrjan	8	
Season	Division	P	W	D	L	F	A	Pts	Pos	Cupa României	Other competitions	European presence	Name	Goals	Source
Season	League									Cupa României	Other competitions	European presence	Top scorer		Source
