= 1954 FC Dinamo București season =

FC Dinamo București
1954 season
- Manager: Angelo Niculescu
- Divizia A: 3rd
- Romanian Cup: Finalist
- Top goalscorer: Alexandru Ene (20)

The 1954 season was Dinamo București's sixth season in Divizia A. For the first time, Dinamo reaches the final of Romanian Cup, but loses to Metalul Reşiţa. In Divizia A, Dinamo ends third, behind champions Flacăra Roşie and CCA. For the third year in a row, the goalscorer of Divizia A is a Dinamo player. Alexandru Ene scored 20 goals out of 62 of the entire team.

== Results ==
Divizia A
Round	Date	Opponent	Stadium	Result
1	21 March 1954	Ştiinţa Cluj	A	2-1
2	28 March 1954	Locomotiva Timişoara	H	1-1
3	4 April 1954	Progresul ICO Oradea	A	4-2
4	7 April 1954	Metalul Hunedoara	H	6-1
5	11 April 1954	Dinamo Oraşul Stalin	H	3-2
6	16 June 1954	CCA București	H	0-0
7	26 May 1954	Ştiinţa Timişoara	A	0-0
8	19 May 1954	Flacăra Petroşani	A	1-2
9	23 May 1954	Locomotiva Târgu Mureş	H	4-2
10	30 May 1954	Locomotiva București	A	2-2
11	2 June 1954	Flamura Roşie Arad	A	0-1
12	6 June 1954	Flacăra Ploieşti	H	3-3
13	13 June 1954	Metalul Câmpia Turzii	H	1-1
14	1 August 1954	Ştiinţa Cluj	H	3-4
15	29 September 1954	Locomotiva Timişoara	A	1-1
16	26 September 1954	Progresul ICO Oradea	H	4-0
17	3 October 1954	Metalul Hunedoara	A	5-2
18	10 October 1954	Dinamo Oraşul Stalin	A	2-1
19	17 October 1954	CCA București	A	2-2
20	24 October 1954	Ştiinţa Timişoara	H	1-3
21	27 October 1954	Flacăra Petroşani	H	2-2
22	31 October 1954	Locomotiva Târgu Mureş	A	0-1
23	7 November 1954	Locomotiva București	H	2-1
24	10 November 1954	Flamura Roşie Arad	H	5-0
25	14 November 1954	Flacăra Ploieşti	A	4-1
26	24 November 1954	Metalul Câmpia Turzii	A	4-0

Cupa României
Round	Date	Opponent	Stadium	Result
Last 32	11 August 1954	Metalul Câmpina	A	3-0
Last 16	30 October 1954	Metalul București	A	4-2
Quarterfinals	28 November 1954	Flamura Roşie Sfântu Gheorghe	H	3-0
Semifinals	1 December 1954	Flacăra Ploieşti	H	4-1
Final	5 December 1954	Metalul Reşiţa	Republicii	0-2

== Romanian Cup final ==
5 December 1954
13:30

Dinamo București	0 – 2	Metalul Reşiţa
		Ştefan Szeleş 30', 40'

Stadionul Republicii, Bucharest
Attendance: 30.000
Referee: Dumitru Schulder (București)

DINAMO:
GK	Constantin Niculescu
DF	Iosif Szökő
DF	Ladislau Băcuț
MF	Anton Fodor
MF	Valeriu Călinoiu
MF	Gheorghe Băcuț
FW	Carol Bartha
FW	Titus Ozon	(substituted off) 46'
FW	Nicolae Dumitru
FW	Alexandru Ene
FW	Ion Suru
Substitutions:
FW	Valeriu Neagu	(substituted in) 58'
Manager:
Angelo Niculescu

METALUL REŞIŢA:
GK	Iosif Zarici
DF	Emil Chirilă
DF	Valentin Teodorescu
MF	Eugen Potoceanu
MF	Mihai Munteanu
MF	Ştefan Apro
FW	Iosif Jojart II
FW	Petru Mioc
FW	Petre Iovan	(substituted off) 70'
FW	Ştefan Urcan
FW	Ştefan Szeleş
Substitutions:
FW	Vida	(substituted in) 70'
Manager:
Mihai Zsizsik

- Assistant referees:
  - Constantin Mitran (București)
  - Solomon Segal (București)

== Squad ==
Standard team: Florea Birtașu – Iosif Szökő, Ladislau Băcuț – Gheorghe Băcuț, Valeriu Călinoiu, Gheorghe Toma – Carol Bartha, Ion Suru, Dumitru Nicolae, Titus Ozon, Alexandru Ene.

=== Transfers ===
Dinamo makes significant changes in the squad again. It is brought goalkeeper Florea Birtașu free of contract after the disband of Casei Armatei Câmpulung Moldovenesc. From Dinamo Oraşul Stalin are brought Valeriu Neagu and Alexandru Ene, while Joseph Fuleiter was transferred from Flamura Rosie Arad. Constantin Marinescu and Nicolae Voinescu go to newly promoted Metalul Hunedoara.
