= 1956 FC Dinamo București season =

FC Dinamo București
1956 season
- Manager: Angelo Niculescu
- Divizia A: 2nd
- Romanian Cup: Last 16
- European Cup: 1st Round
- Top goalscorer: Alexandru Ene (17)

The 1956 season was Dinamo București's eighth season in Divizia A. As Romanian champions, Dinamo plays in the European Cup, becoming the first Romanian team to participate in this competition. In Divizia A, Dinamo ends second place, four points behind the champions. Alexandru Ene is also second in the goalscorer's hierarchy, with 17 goals.

== Results ==
Divizia A
Round	Date	Opponent	Stadium	Result
1	18 March 1956	Dinamo Bacău	A	1-0
2	24 March 1956	Dinamo Oraşul Stalin	H	2-1
3	3 May 1956	Ştiinţa Cluj	A	2-2
4	8 April 1956	Progresul București	A	3-1
5	11 April 1956	CCA București	H	0-4
6	29 April 1956	Flacăra Petroşani	H	0-0
7	6 May 1956	Progresul ICO Oradea	A	0-1
8	13 May 1956	Locomotiva București	A	3-2
9	23 May 1956	Locomotiva Timişoara	H	1-0
11	3 June 1956	Ştiinţa Timişoara	A	1-3
12	7 June 1956	Flamura Roşie Arad	H	3-2
13	21 June 1956	Energia Flacăra Ploieşti	H	2-1
14	12 August 1956	Dinamo Bacău	H	2-1
15	11 October 1956	Dinamo Oraşul Stalin	A	0-1
16	25 October 1956	Ştiinţa Cluj	H	8-0
17	30 August 1956	Progresul București	H	2-3
18	16 September 1956	CCA București	A	4-3
19	1 November 1956	Energia Minerul Petroşani	A	0-0
20	8 November 1956	Progresul ICO Oradea	H	3-0
21	7 October 1956	Locomotiva București	H	2-3
22	14 October 1956	Locomotiva Timişoara	A	0-1
24	28 October 1956	Ştiinţa Timişoara	H	4-1
25	4 November 1956	Flamura Roşie Arad	A	2-3
26	18 November 1956	Energia Flacăra Ploieşti	A	3-1

Cupa României
Round	Date	Opponent	Stadium	Result
Last 32	13 September 1956	Energia Flacăra Ploieşti	A	5–1
Last 16	15 November 1956	Steagul Roşu Oraşul Stalin	A	3–4

== European Cup ==
On August 26, 1956, Dinamo plays their first European game. In the preliminary round, Dinamo meets Galatasaray Istanbul. The first match takes place in Bucharest, on 23 August stadium, in front of 85.000 spectators. Dinamo wins 3–1 and then they move forward after a 1–2 loss in Istanbul. In the first round, Dinamo is eliminated by CDNA Sofia.

=== First European match for Dinamo ===
26 August 1956
17:00

Dinamo București	3–1	Galatasaray Istanbul
Gheorghe Voica 10', 66'; Alexandru Ene 82'		Metin Oktay 78'

Stadionul 23 August, Bucharest
Attendance: 85,000
Referee: Francesco Liverani (Italy)

DINAMO:
GK	Florea Birtașu
DF	Gheorghe Băcuț
DF	Ladislau Băcuț
DF	Florian Anghel
MF	Valeriu Călinoiu
MF	Ion Nunweiller
FW	Vasile Anghel
FW	Alexandru Ene
FW	Nicolae Dumitru
FW	Gheorghe Voica
FW	Ion Suru
Manager:
Angelo Niculescu

GALATASARAY:
GK	Turgay Şeren
DF	Saim Taşerengin
DF	Metin Kinay
MF	Ali Beratligil
MF	Ergun Ercins
MF	Rober Eryol
FW	Isfendiyar Açikgöz
FW	Metin Oktay
FW	Suat Mamat
FW	Kadri Aytac
FW	Güngör Okay
Manager:
Gündüz Kiliç

- Assistant referees:
  - Adami (Italy)
  - Anoscia (Italy)

=== The other matches in the European Cup ===
Preliminary round – second leg

30 September 1956

Galatasaray Istanbul	2–1	Dinamo București
Kadri Aytaç 40'; Metin Oktay 90'		Ion Suru 30'

Mithat Paşa, Istanbul
Attendance: 23,764
Referee: Gustav Jiranek (Austria)

Dinamo București won 4–3 on aggregate.

First round – first leg

21 October 1956

CDNA Sofia	8–1	Dinamo București
Kolev 12' 27' 56' 64'; Milanov 21' 67'; Panaiotov 65'; Dimitrov 80'		Gheorghe Băcuț 71' (pen.)

Vasil Levski National Stadium, Sofia
Attendance: 50,000
Referee: Vasa Stefanović (Yugoslavia)

First round – second leg

30 December 1956

Dinamo București	3–2	CDNA Sofia
Dumitru 58' (pen.); Lazăr 67'; Neagu 84'		Stoianov 22'; Ianev 62'

Stadionul Republicii, Bucharest
Attendance: 20,000
Referee: Gustav Jiranek (Austria)

CDNA Sofia won 10–4 on aggregate

== Transfers ==
Before the season start, Iuliu Uțu is brought from Stiinta Timişoara, for Petre Curcan. Carol Bartha is transferred to Progresul Oradea. Vasile Anghel and Ion Nunweiller are promoted from the junior team.
