= 1955 FC Dinamo București season =

FC Dinamo București
1955 season
- Manager: Angelo Niculescu
- Divizia A: Champions
- Romanian Cup: Semifinals
- Top goalscorer: Alexandru Ene (14)

The 1955 season was Dinamo București's seventh season in Divizia A. Dinamo bring the first Romanian title home, winning the championship by three points. During the season, Dinamo played 24 matches, winning 15, drawing 7 and losing only 2.

== Results ==
Divizia A
Round	Date	Opponent	Stadium	Result
1	6 March 1955	Locomotiva Constanţa	H	4-1
2	13 March 1955	Dinamo Oraşul Stalin	A	2-1
3	20 March 1955	Ştiinţa Cluj	H	0-0
4	23 March 1955	Ştiinţa Timişoara	A	2-1
5	27 March 1955	Flamura Roşie Arad	H	2-0
6	3 April 1955	Flacăra Petroşani	A	0-0
7	10 April 1955	Locomotiva Târgu Mureş	H	6-1
8	13 April 1955	CCA București	A	0-0
9	17 April 1955	Flacăra Ploieşti	H	1-1
10	24 April 1955	Avântul Reghin	H	1-1
11	1 May 1955	Progresul București	A	3-0
13	31 August 1955	Locomotiva Timişoara	A	1-5
14	21 August 1955	Locomotiva Constanţa	A	1-0
15	24 August 1955	Dinamo Oraşul Stalin	H	3-1
16	28 August 1955	Ştiinţa Cluj	A	2-0
17	16 October 1955	Ştiinţa Timişoara	A	5-2
18	23 October 1955	Flamura Roşie Arad	A	4-1
19	26 October 1955	Flacăra Petroşani	H	2-1
20	30 October 1955	Locomotiva Târgu Mureş	A	2-1
21	6 November 1955	CCA București	H	2-1
22	13 November 1955	Flacăra Ploieşti	H	1-1
23	16 November 1955	Avântul Reghin	A	0-0
24	20 November 1955	Progresul București	H	0-1
26	30 November 1955	Locomotiva Timişoara	H	2-1

Divizia A 1955 winners
Dinamo București
1st title

Cupa României
Round	Date	Opponent	Stadium	Result
Last 32	13 October 1955	Locomotiva Turnu Severin	A	5-0
Last 16	2 November 1955	Flacăra Mediaş	A	3-2
Quarterfinals	23 November 1955	Avântul Fălticeni	A	1-0
Semifinals	4 December 1955	Progresul Oradea	A	1-2

== Squad ==
Goalkeepers: Petre Curcan (4 / 0), Florea Birtașu (18 / 0 ), Nicolae Panaghia (3 / 0).
Defenders: Gheorghe Băcuț (24 / 0), Ladislau Băcuț (24 / 0), Iosif Szökő (18 / 1).
Midfielders: Valeriu Călinoiu (22 / 1), Gheorghe Toma (24 / 0), Alexandru Nemeş (4 / 0), Florian Anghel (6 / 0).
Forwards: Carol Bartha (11 / 4); Onoriu Boian (8 / 1); Nicolae Dumitru (21 / 2); Alexandru Ene (23 / 14); Valeriu Neagu (23 / 10); Ion Suru (22 / 7); Nicolae Magheţ (11 / 2); Mihai Raica (1 / 0); Gheorghe Niţulescu (1 / 0).
(league appearances and goals listed in brackets)

Manager: Angelo Niculescu.

=== Transfers ===
Titus Ozon leaves Dinamo after five years in the red and white shirt, bound for Progresul București, newly promoted team. The main transfer made by Dinamo is the goalkeeper Petru Curcan from Stiinta Timişoara.
