= 1962–63 FC Dinamo București season =

FC Dinamo București
1962–63 season
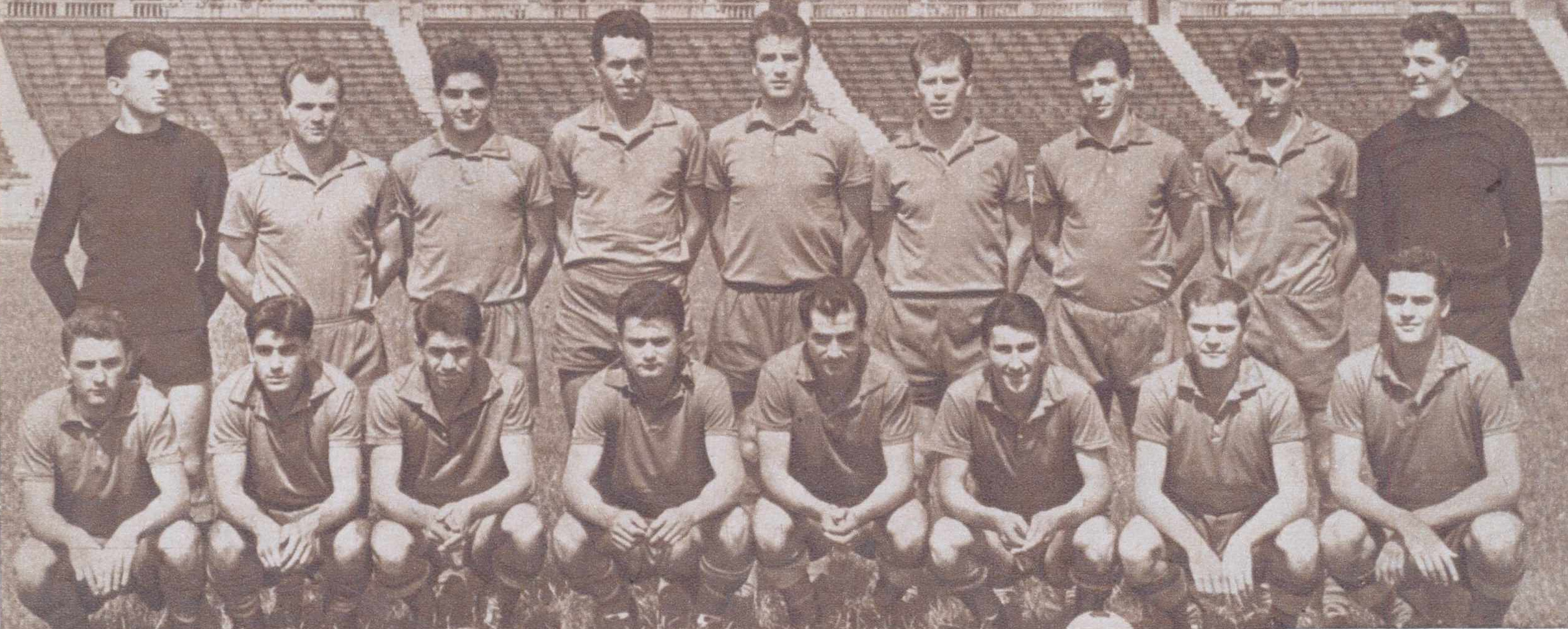
- Manager: Angelo Niculescu (rounds 1–14), Traian Ionescu and Dumitru Nicolae (rounds 15–27)
- Divizia A: 1st
- Romanian Cup: Quarterfinals
- European Cup: Preliminary round
- Top goalscorer: Constantin Frățilă (9)

The 1962–63 season was Dinamo București's 14th season in Divizia A. Dinamo retained the title won in the previous season. In the European Cup, Dinamo took part in the preliminary round, but were beaten by Galatasaray Istanbul.

Because the team were only seventh in Divizia A half way through the season, the team's manager, Angelo Niculescu, was replaced by Dumitru Nicolae ("Nicuşor") and Traian Ionescu, who were appointed to manage the team jointly.

== Results ==
Divizia A
Round	Date	Opponent	Stadium	Result
1	19 August 1962	CSMS Iaşi	A	2–2
2	26 August 1962	Farul Constanţa	H	0–0
3	2 September 1962	Rapid București	A	1–2
4	14 October 1962	Dinamo Bacău	A	0–0
5	17 October 1962	Petrolul Ploieşti	H	2–1
6	26 September 1962	Progresul București	A	0–0
7	30 September 1962	UTA	A	1–0
8	7 October 1962	Minerul Lupeni	H	4–2
9	28 October 1962	CS Oradea	A	3–1
10	9 December 1962	Steagul Roşu Braşov	H	4–0
11	11 November 1962	Steaua București	H	2–2
12	13 March 1963	Ştiinţa Timişoara	A	1–0
13	28 November 1962	Ştiinţa Cluj	H	0–0
14	2 December 1962	Viitorul București	A	0–1
15	17 March 1963	CSMS Iaşi	H	6–1
16	24 March 1963	Farul Constanţa	A	1–0
17	31 March 1963	Rapid București	H	1–1
18	7 April 1963	Dinamo Bacău	H	1–0
19	14 April 1963	Petrolul Ploieşti	A	1–0
20	21 April 1963	Progresul București	H	3–2
21	28 April 1963	UTA	H	4–2
22	19 May 1963	Minerul Lupeni	A	2–1
23	26 May 1963	Steaua București	A	0–0
24	9 June 1963	CS Oradea	H	4–0
25	30 June 1963	Steagul Roşu Braşov	A	0–3
26	7 July 1963	Ştiinţa Timişoara	H	0–1
27	14 July 1963	Ştiinţa Cluj	A	3–3

Divizia A 1962–63 Winners
Dinamo București
3rd Title

Cupa României
Round	Date	Opponent	Stadium	Result
Last 32	10 April 1963	CFR Roşiori	A	3–1
Last 16	15 May 1963	Dinamo Bacău	Braşov	6–5
Quarterfinals	27 June 1963	Petrolul Ploieşti	Braşov	0–2

== European Cup ==
Preliminary round – first leg

9 September 1962

Dinamo București	1–1	(Turkey) Galatasaray Istanbul
Pîrcălab 71' (pen.)		Oktay 53'

Stadionul 23 August, Bucharest
Attendance: 30,550
Referee: Georgi Hristov (Bulgaria)

Second leg

16 September 1962

Galatasaray Istanbul	3–0	Dinamo București
Oktay 4' (pen.); Kökten 51'; Kutver 78'

Mithat Paşa, Istanbul
Attendance: 17,466
Referee: Atanas Stavrev (Bulgaria)

== Squad ==
Goalkeepers: Iuliu Uțu (17 / 0); Ilie Datcu (13 / 0).
Defenders: Cornel Popa (25 / 0); Ion Nunweiller (18 / 0); Dumitru Ivan (25 / 1); Ilie Constantinescu (8 / 0).
Midfielders: Vasile Alexandru (13 / 1); Lică Nunweiller (22 / 1); Constantin Ștefan (25 / 0).
Forwards: Ion Pîrcălab (21 / 7); Constantin Frățilă (15 / 9); Iosif Varga (22 / 4); Aurel Unguroiu (20 / 3); Gheorghe Ene (19 / 7); Ion Țîrcovnicu (24 / 7); Vasile Anghel (3 / 0); Haralambie Eftimie (5 / 3); Nicolae Niculescu (2 / 0); Constantin David (12 / 1); Nicolae Selymes (8 / 2); Vasile Gergely (1 / 0).
(league appearances and goals listed in brackets)

Manager: Nicolae Dumitru / Traian Ionescu.

== Transfers ==
Dinamo's only transfers took place in the winter break. Vasile Gergely of Viitorul București and Nicolae Selymes from Steagul Roşu reinforced a group from which Vasile Anghel had gone to Petrolul Ploieşti and Haralambie Eftimie to Dinamo Bacau.
