= 1958–59 FC Dinamo București season =

FC Dinamo București
1958–59 season
- Manager: Iuliu Baratky
- Divizia A: 2nd
- Romanian Cup: Winner

The 1958–59 season was Dinamo București's tenth season in Divizia A. Dinamo finishes second in the championship, one point behind the winners, Petrolul Ploiesti, but wins for the first time Cupa Romaniei. In this competition, Dinamo manages to pass by their main rivals, UTA, CCA, and Rapid. It is the first trophy for Iuliu Baratky as coach, after four Romanian Cups won as a player.

The beginning of the season was marked by a decision of FRF to forbid Dinamo and two other teams to have tournaments abroad. Later, because of poor results, the club sanctioned their players, Calinoiu, Dumitru, Anghel and Utu being suspended.

== Results ==
Divizia A
| Round | Date | Opponent | Stadium | Result |
|---|---|---|---|---|
| 1 | 24 August 1958 | Steagul Roşu Oraşul Stalin | H | 6-0 |
| 2 | 31 August 1958 | Jiul Petroşani | A | 1-1 |
| 3 | 21 September 1958 | Progresul București | A | 2-1 |
| 4 | 28 September 1958 | Dinamo Bacău | H | 3-2 |
| 5 | 5 October 1958 | UTA | A | 2-1 |
| 6 | 12 October 1958 | CCA București | A | 2-0 |
| 7 | 5 November 1958 | Ştiinţa Cluj | H | 1-0 |
| 8 | 9 November 1958 | Farul Constanţa | A | 4-1 |
| 9 | 16 November 1958 | Rapid București | H | 2-3 |
| 10 | 19 November 1958 | Ştiinţa Timişoara | H | 4-1 |
| 11 | 23 November 1958 | Petrolul Ploieşti | A | 1-3 |
| 12 | 15 March 1959 | Steagul Roşu Oraşul Stalin | A | 2-3 |
| 13 | 22 March 1959 | Jiul Petroşani | H | 2-1 |
| 14 | 29 March 1959 | Progresul București | H | 0-1 |
| 15 | 5 April 1959 | Dinamo Bacău | A | 1-1 |
| 16 | 3 May 1959 | UTA | H | 2-0 |
| 17 | 10 May 1959 | CCA București | H | 0-1 |
| 18 | 17 May 1959 | Ştiinţa Cluj | A | 1-1 |
| 19 | 24 May 1959 | Farul Constanţa | H | 1-1 |
| 20 | 31 May 1959 | Rapid București | A | 3-2 |
| 21 | 7 June 1959 | Ştiinţa Timişoara | A | 5-3 |
| 22 | 10 June 1959 | Petrolul Ploieşti | H | 2-0 |

Cupa României
| Round | Date | Opponent | Stadium | Result |
|---|---|---|---|---|
| Last 32 | 8 March 1959 | Rafinăria Câmpina | Ploieşti | 4-0 |
| Last 16 | 1 April 1959 | UTA | Sibiu | 1-0 |
| Quarterfinals | 20 May 1959 | CCA București | București | 3-1 |
| Semifinals | 3 June 1959 | Rapid București | București | 5-3 |
| Final | 14 June 1959 | CSM Baia Mare | București | 4-0 |

Cupa României 1959 Winners
Dinamo București
1st Title

== Romanian Cup final ==
14 June 1959

| Dinamo București | 4 – 0 | CSM Baia Mare |
|---|---|---|
| Iosif Szakacs 30', 80' (pen.); Vasile Anghel 57'; Iosif Varga 80' |

Stadionul 23 August, Bucharest
Attendance: 45.000
Referee: Mihai Popa (București)

DINAMO:
| GK | Iuliu Uțu |
| DF | Cornel Popa |
| DF | Valeriu Călinoiu |
| DF | Nicolae Panait |
| MF | Ion Nunweiller |
| MF | Vasile Alexandru |
| FW | Iosif Varga |
| FW | Vasile Anghel |
| FW | Iosif Szakacs |
| FW | Alexandru Ene |
| FW | Ladislau Köszegi |
Manager:
Iuliu Baratky

CSM BAIA MARE:
| GK | Solomon Vlad |
| DF | Victor Mălăieru |
| DF | Iosif Gergely |
| DF | Dumitru Vasilescu |
| MF | Laszlo Gergely |
| MF | Adalbert Feher |
| FW | Elemer Sulyok |
| FW | Horzsa |
| FW | Ernestin Drăgan |
| FW | Ladislau Vlad |
| FW | Vasile Rusu |
Manager:
Constantin Woronkowski

== Transfers ==
Before the start of the season Dinamo bought Iosif Varga (from CS Târgu Mureş), Iosif Bükössy (from CCA), Iosif Szakacs. Valentin Neagu (to Progresul), Petre Babone (to Petrolul), Iosif Lazăr and Florin Anghel (to Dinamo Bacău) left the club.
