= 1953 FC Dinamo București season =

FC Dinamo București
1953 season
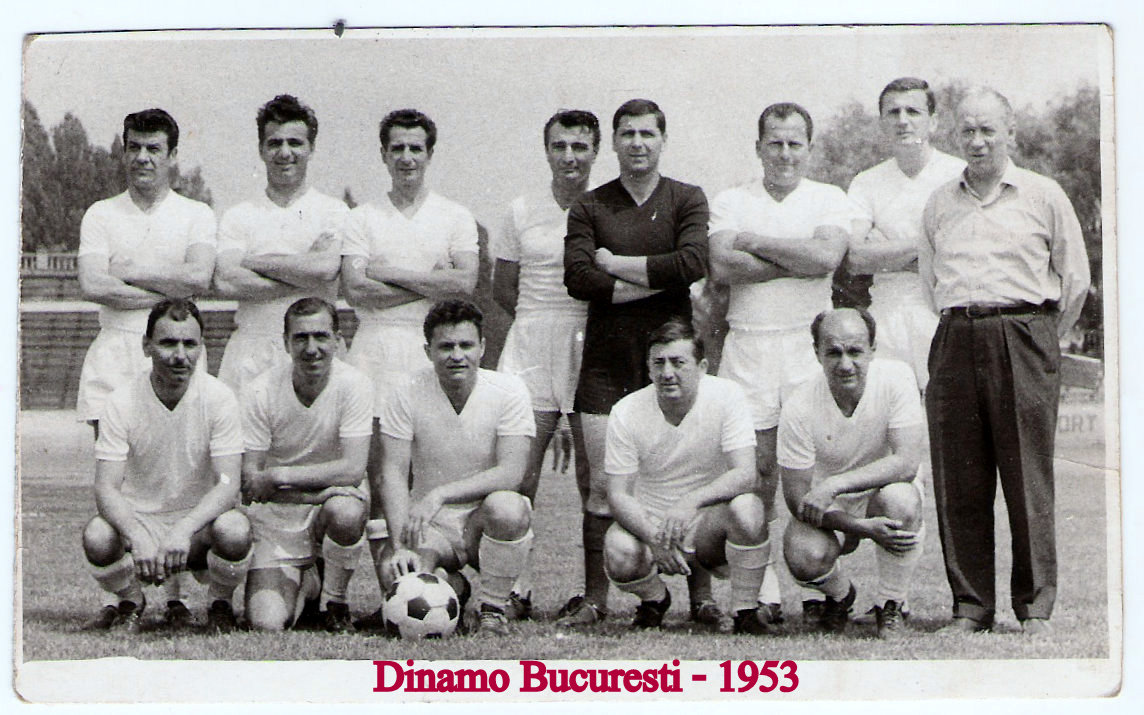
- Manager: Iuliu Baratky (rounds 1-11), Angelo Niculescu (rounds 12-22)
- Divizia A: 2nd
- Romanian Cup: Quarterfinals
- Top goalscorer: Titus Ozon (12)

The 1953 season was Dinamo București's fifth season in Divizia A. For the third year in a row, Dinamo ended the championship in second place, three points behind the champions, CCA Bucharest. Titus Ozon won the Division A top scorer title for the second consecutive year with 12 goals this season.

Games from rounds 9 to 11 were played in Bucharest because of a decision made by Football Central Committee, in order to see all the players for the national team. Thus, the match between Ştiinţa Cluj and Dinamo, originally scheduled to be held in Cluj-Napoca, Bucharest.

The game between Dinamo and Casa Armatei Câmpulung Moldovenesc, in the 16th round, never took place, due to the Bucovina club being disbanded, following a decision taken by the Republican Association CCA to have only one representative in football (in this case CCA Bucharest).

== Results ==
Divizia A
Round	Date	Opponent	Stadium	Result
1	15 March 1953	Flamura Roşie Arad	A	1-2
2	22 March 1953	Dinamo Oraşul Stalin	H	3-2
3	30 March 1953	Progresul ICO Oradea	H	4-1
4	5 April 1953	Locomotiva București	A	0-2
5	12 April 1953	Casa Armatei Câmpulung Moldovenesc	A	1-2
6	22 April 1953	CCA București	H	2-1
7	26 April 1953	Locomotiva Timişoara	A	0-0
8	3 May 1953	Flacăra Petroşani	A	2-0
9	8 May 1953	Ştiinţa Cluj	H	2-0
10	12 May 1953	Locomotiva Târgu Mureş	H	1-0
11	17 May 1953	Ştiinţa Timişoara	H	4-2
12	27 August 1953	Flamura Roşie Arad	H	1-1
13	6 September 1953	Dinamo Oraşul Stalin	A	1-3
14	13 September 1953	Progresul ICO Oradea	A	2-0
15	20 September 1953	Locomotiva București	H	2-1
16	27 September 1953	Casa Armatei Câmpulung Moldovenesc	H	/-/
17	6 October 1953	CCA București	A	3-1
18	11 October 1953	Locomotiva Timişoara	H	1-1
19	18 October 1953	Flacăra Petroşani	H	3-3
20	25 October 1953	Ştiinţa Cluj	A	2-4
21	1 November 1953	Locomotiva Târgu Mureş	A	2-3
22	15 November 1953	Ştiinţa Timişoara	H	0-0

Cupa României
Round	Date	Opponent	Stadium	Result
Last 32	9 September 1953	Şantierul Constanţa	A	2-1
Last 16	30 September 1953	Ştiinţa Iaşi	A	3-2
Quarterfinals	21 October 1953	Ştiinţa Cluj	H	0-2

== Squad ==
Standard team: Iosif Fuleiter (Constantin Constantinescu) – Iosif Szökő, Ladislau Băcuț, Florian Ambru (Anton Fodor) – Gheorghe Băcuț, Valeriu Călinoiu (Viliam Florescu) – Dan Ion Sârbu (Nicolae Voinescu), Carol Bartha, Ion Suru, Nicolae Dumitru, Titus Ozon (Alexandru Ene).

At the end of the first half of the season, coach Iuliu Baratky left the club and was replaced by Angelo Niculescu.

=== Transfers ===
Since the transfers were discouraged by the Federation, Dinamo has a few players during the inter-competitive, only five players from Dinamo Orasul Stalin, which included Nicolae Voinescu.
