= 1952 FC Dinamo București season =

FC Dinamo București
1952 season
- Manager: Iuliu Baratky
- Divizia A: 2nd
- Cupa României: Semifinals
- Top goalscorer: Titus Ozon (17)

The 1952 season was Dinamo București's fourth season in Divizia A. Dinamo came again close to their first championship in history, but finished only on second position with 34 points, two points behind champion CCA. Dinamo has not lost any match at home and was the only team to defeat the champions the entire season. Titus Ozon became the first scorer of the tournament in Dinamo's history with 17 goals this season. They also appeared in the semifinals of the Cupa României, and lost to eventual winners CCA.

Due to extremely long break (May to August) created by two national team matches and preparation for participation in the Olympic Games, a part of Dinamo's players were part in this period of a team who participated in the Nations Cup.

== Results ==
Divizia A
Round	Date	Opponent	Stadium	Result
1	16 March 1952	Casa Armatei Câmpulung Moldovenesc	A	0-0
2	23 March 1952	Ştiinţa Cluj	H	2-0
3	30 March 1952	Dinamo Oraşul Stalin	A	4-2
4	6 April 1952	Locomotiva Târgu Mureş	H	1-0
5	13 April 1952	Locomotiva Timişoara	A	1-2
6	20 April 1952	Progresul ICO Oradea	H	3-1
7	17 August 1952	CCA București	A	1-1
8	24 August 1952	Flacăra Ploieşti	A	2-0
9	31 August 1952	Flamura Roşie Arad	H	2-2
10	3 September 1952	Flacăra Petroşani	H	7-3
11	7 September 1952	Metalul Câmpia Turzii	A	5-0
12	14 September 1952	Casa Armatei Câmpulung Moldovenesc	H	1-1
13	21 September 1952	Ştiinţa Cluj	A	2-1
14	28 September 1952	Dinamo Oraşul Stalin	H	3-0
15	5 October 1952	Locomotiva Târgu Mureş	A	1-5
16	12 October 1952	Locomotiva Timişoara	H	3-2
17	19 October 1952	Progresul ICO Oradea	A	0-0
18	2 November 1952	CCA București	H	1-0
19	9 November 1952	Flacăra Ploieşti	H	4-1
20	16 November 1952	Flamura Roşie Arad	A	1-1
21	23 November 1952	Flacăra Petroşani	A	2-0
22	27 November 1952	Metalul Câmpia Turzii	H	5-1

Cupa României
Round	Date	Opponent	Stadium	Result
Last 32	10 September 1952	Înainte Sibiu	A	3-3
Last 16	1 October 1952	Avântul Topliţa	A	5-2
Quarterfinals	15 October 1952	Casa Armatei Câmpulung Moldovenesc	H	3-0
Semifinals	3 December 1952	CCA București	A	2-3

== Squad ==
Standard team: Constantin Constantinescu (Iosif Fuleiter) – Constantin Marinescu, Ladislau Băcuț (Florian Ambru), Anton Fodor – Gheorghe Băcuț, Valeriu Călinoiu (Viliam Florescu) – Justin Zehan, Carol Bartha (Iosif Lutz), Ion Suru, Nicolae Dumitru, Titus Ozon (Alexandru Ene).

=== Transferuri ===
Titus Ozon came back to Dinamo, after a year spent at Dinamo Oraşul Stalin. Some of the new players brought by coach Iuliu Baratky were goalkeeper Constantin Constantinescu (also from Dinamo Oraşul Stalin), Ladislau Băcuț (Flamura Roşie Arad), Anton Fodor (Locomotiva Timişoara) and Dumitru Ignat (Dinamo Oraşul Stalin).
