= 1951 FC Dinamo București season =

FC Dinamo București
1951 season
- Manager: Iuliu Baratky
- Divizia A: 2nd
- Cupa României: Last 16
- Top goalscorer: Constantin Popescu (11)

The 1951 season was Dinamo București's third season in Divizia A. For the first time, Dinamo fought for the championship, ending the season 2nd place, with 32 points, the same number as the champions CCA București. The difference was only one goal between the two teams. Constantin Popescu ranked third in the top scorer with 11 goals scored.

On October 13, 1951 Dinamo Sports Park was inaugurated.

== Results ==
Divizia A
Round	Date	Opponent	Stadium	Result
1	25 March 1951	Dinamo Oraşul Stalin	A	1-0
2	31 March 1951	Locomotiva București	A	3-2
3	8 April 1951	Ştiinţa Timişoara	H	4-1
4	15 April 1951	Flamura Roşie Arad	A	2-2
5	22 April 1951	Flacăra București	H	1-0
6	6 May 1951	CCA București	A	1-2
7	27 May 1951	Progresul ICO Oradea	H	1-2
8	3 June 1951	Locomotiva Timişoara	A	0-0
9	10 June 1951	Flacăra Petroşani	H	4-0
10	17 June 1951	Locomotiva Târgu Mureş	A	3-2
11	24 June 1951	Ştiinţa Cluj	H	3-3
12	25 August 1951	Dinamo Oraşul Stalin	H	5-2
13	1 September 1951	Locomotiva București	H	5-1
14	9 September 1951	Ştiinţa Timişoara	A	2-0
15	16 September 1951	Flamura Roşie Arad	H	1-3
16	20 September 1951	Flacăra București	A	4-2
17	1 October 1951	CCA București	H	6-2
18	7 October 1951	Progresul ICO Oradea	A	0-3
19	14 October 1951	Locomotiva Timişoara	H	1-0
20	21 October 1951	Flacăra Petroşani	A	0-0
21	28 October 1951	Locomotiva Târgu Mureş	H	3-1
22	4 November 1951	Ştiinţa Cluj	A	2-1

Cupa României
Round	Date	Opponent	Stadium	Result
Last 32	27 June 1951	Locomotiva PCA Constanţa	A	2-1
Last 16	4 July 1951	Flacăra București	A	2-3

== Squad ==
Standard team: Iosif Fuleiter – Florian Ambru, Caius Novac – Constantin Marinescu, Gheorghe Băcuț, Valeriu Călinoiu (Viliam Florescu) – Iosif Szökő, Carol Bartha, Ion Suru, Nicolae Dumitru, Constantin Popescu (Alexandru Ene).

=== Transfers ===
Dinamo changes the squad a lot, especially because the second team, Dinamo Oraşul Stalin promoted. Seven players from Bucharest were transferred to Braşov. Titus Ozon, Nicolae Voinescu & Marin Apostol moved to Dinamo 2. Instead, Dinamo brought Ion Suru (Locomotiva București), Iosif Szökő (Progresul ICO Oradea), Valeriu Călinoiu (Flacăra București), Alexandru Ene (Metalul București) and Iosif Fuleiter (Ştiinţa Cluj).
