= 1961–62 FC Dinamo București season =

FC Dinamo București
1961–62 season
- Manager: Traian Ionescu (rounds 1–13), Constantin Teaşcă (rounds 14–17), Dumitru Nicolae
- Divizia A: 1st
- Romanian Cup: Last 16
- Top goalscorer: Gheorghe Ene (19)

The 1961–62 season was Dinamo București's 13th season in Divizia A. Dinamo won their second championship, ending the season with 36 points, three more than the second ranked, Petrolul Ploieşti. Gheorghe Ene is again ranked in the top three leading scorers, with 19 goals.

The success came in spite of the manager changes: Traian Ionescu managed the team in the first part of the championship, Constantin Teaşcă replaced him in the beginning of the second part and Dumitru Nicolae "Nicuşor" ended the season.

== Results ==
Divizia A
Round	Date	Opponent	Stadium	Result
1	20 August 1961	Dinamo Piteşti	A	4–3
2	27 August 1961	Dinamo Bacău	H	1-0
3	3 September 1961	Rapid București	A	2–1
4	10 September 1961	UTA	A	1–0
5	17 September 1961	Ştiinţa Cluj	H	2–2
6	24 September 1961	Steagul Roşu Braşov	A	1–2
7	1 November 1961	CCA București	H	1–1
8	15 October 1961	Jiul Petroşani	H	5–2
9	29 October 1961	Metalul Târgovişte	A	2–1
10	5 November 1961	Petrolul Ploieşti	H	0–2
11	11 November 1961	Progresul București	A	4–1
12	19 November 1961	Minerul Lupeni	A	3–0
13	26 November 1961	Ştiinţa Timişoara	H	0–1
14	18 March 1962	Dinamo Piteşti	H	2–2
15	25 March 1962	Dinamo Bacău	A	5–1
16	1 April 1962	Rapid București	H	0–1
17	8 April 1962	UTA	H	5–2
18	15 April 1962	Ştiinţa Cluj	A	2–2
19	23 April 1962	Steagul Roşu Braşov	H	2–1
20	30 April 1962	Steaua București	A	1–0
21	13 May 1962	Jiul Petroşani	A	0–0
22	27 May 1962	Metalul Târgovişte	H	7–1
23	3 June 1962	Petrolul Ploieşti	A	1–1
24	10 June 1962	Progresul București	H	2–2
25	7 July 1962	Minerul Lupeni	H	7–4
26	1 July 1962	Ştiinţa Timişoara	A	2–2

Divizia A 1961–62 Winners
Dinamo București
2nd Title

Cupa României
Round	Date	Opponent	Stadium	Result
Last 32	6 May 1962	Rapid Târgu Mureş	A	1-0
Last 16	20 May 1962	Petrolul Ploieşti	București	1-2

== Squad ==
Goalkeepers: Ilie Datcu (20 / 0); Iuliu Uțu (8 / 0).
Defenders: Cornel Popa (24 / 0); Ion Nunweiller (26 / 3); Dumitru Ivan (26 / 0); Nicolae Panait (1 / 0).
Midfielders: Ilie Constantinescu (11 / 0); Vasile Alexandru (15 / 3); Lică Nunweiller (18 / 0); Constantin Ștefan (16 / 0); Mircea Stoenescu (1 / 0).
Forwards: Ion Pîrcălab (24 / 7); Constantin Frățilă (19 / 5); Gheorghe Ene (20 / 19); Ion Țîrcovnicu (20 / 5); Iosif Varga (15 / 4); Haralambie Eftimie (16 / 11); Constantin David (20 / 4); Tănase Dumitrescu (1 / 0); Aurel Unguroiu (5 / 0); Vasile Anghel (5 / 0).
(league appearances and goals listed in brackets)

Manager: Traian Ionescu / Constantin Teașcă / Nicolae Dumitru.

== Transfers ==
The main transfers made by Dinamo were Ion Pîrcălab (from UTA), Aurel Unguroiu (from CSMS Iaşi). Debuts: Ilie Datcu, Constantin Ştefan. Gheorghe Cosma (to Progresul), Mircea Sasu and Selymesi (both to UTA) left Dinamo.
