= 1960–61 FC Dinamo București season =

FC Dinamo București
1960–61 season
- Manager: Traian Ionescu
- Divizia A: 2nd
- Romanian Cup: Last 32
- Top goalscorer: Gheorghe Ene (15)

The 1960–61 season was Dinamo București's 12th season in Divizia A. Dinamo is again on the podium, ending the second position with 32 points, five fewer than CCA. Gheorghe Ene is ranked in the top three leading scorers, with 15 goals.

UTA-Dinamo match of the 14th day, would have re-arranged, according to a decision of the FRF Bureau because of unfavorable conditions of the game, but ultimately the result has been preserved.

== Results ==
Divizia A
Round	Date	Opponent	Stadium	Result
1	4 September 1960	UTA	H	3-0
2	11 September 1960	Ştiinţa Cluj	A	1-0
3	18 September 1960	Progresul București	H	1-1
4	25 September 1960	Ştiinţa Timişoara	H	3-2
5	2 October 1960	Minerul Lupeni	A	2-1
6	9 October 1960	Dinamo Bacău	H	2-0
7	16 October 1960	Rapid București	H	0-0
8	23 October 1960	CSMS Iaşi	A	2-2
9	30 October 1960	Metalul Hunedoara	H	4-0
10	6 November 1960	Farul Constanţa	A	1-0
11	13 November 1960	CCA București	A	2-3
12	21 November 1960	Petrolul Ploieşti	H	6-0
13	27 November 1960	Steagul Roşu Oraşul Stalin	A	1-3
14	19 March 1961	UTA	A	0-1
15	26 March 1961	Ştiinţa Cluj	H	0-2
16	2 April 1961	Progresul București	A	2-1
17	9 April 1961	Ştiinţa Timişoara	A	1-2
18	16 April 1961	Minerul Lupeni	H	6-0
19	23 April 1961	Dinamo Bacău	A	3-2
20	30 April 1961	Rapid București	A	1-2
21	7 May 1961	CSMS Iaşi	H	3-2
22	19 April 1961	Metalul Hunedoara	A	1-1
23	26 April 1961	Farul Constanţa	H	7-0
24	29 June 1961	CCA București	H	2-3
25	2 July 1961	Petrolul Ploieşti	A	0-3
26	9 July 1961	Steagul Roşu Braşov	A	0-2

Cupa României
Round	Date	Opponent	Stadium	Result
Last 32	25 June 1961	CSM Sibiu	Câmpina	0-1

== Squad ==
Manager Traian Ionescu used the following standard squad: Iuliu Uțu (Gheorghe Cozma) – Cornel Popa, Ion Nunweiller, Nicolae Panait – Vasile Alexandru, Lică Nunweiller (Gheorghe Dragomir) – Vasile Anghel, Iosif Varga (Mircea Sasu), Gheorghe Ene (Constantin David), Ion Țîrcovnicu (Mircea Stoenescu), Haralambie Eftimie (Tiberiu Selymesi).

== Transfers ==
Traian Ionescu promotes Tiberiu Selymesi, Mircea Sasu and Mircea Stoenescu from Tineretul Dinamovist (Young Dinamo player). Ion Țîrcovnicu (Dinamo Bacău), Constantin David (Progresul) and Gheorghe Ene (Rapid) are brought. Meanwhile, Ion Motroc is transferred to Rapid.
