= 1957–58 FC Dinamo București season =

FC Dinamo București
1957–58 season
- Manager: Iuliu Baratky
- Divizia A: 6th
- Romanian Cup: Last 32

The 1957–58 season was Dinamo București's ninth season in Divizia A. Because of the competitional system change to fall-spring, in the first half of 1957, Dinamo participated in the Spring Cup, competition where they finished third in the Second Group, and failed to qualify in the final stage. In the championship, Dinamo ended sixth, the worst result in the last seven championships.

== Results ==
Divizia A
Round	Date	Opponent	Stadium	Result
1	18 August 1957	Flamura Roşie Arad	H	0-1
2	25 August 1957	Ştiinţa Timişoara	A	2-2
3	1 September 1957	Locomotiva București	A	4-0
4	5 September 1957	Dinamo Cluj	H	0-1
5	8 September 1957	Energia Flacăra Ploieşti	A	0-0
6	1 December 1957	Progresul București	A	3-5
7	3 October 1957	Energia Steagul Roşu Oraşul Stalin	H	1-1
8	6 October 1957	Energia Târgu Mureş	A	2-0
9	9 October 1957	CCA București	H	3-2
10	7 November 1957	Jiul Petroşani	H	0-1
11	24 November 1957	Progresul ICO Oradea	A	3-0
12	16 March 1958	UTA	A	1-1
13	23 March 1958	Ştiinţa Timişoara	H	2-6
14	30 March 1958	Rapid București	H	0-1
15	13 April 1958	Dinamo Cluj	A	1-0
16	20 April 1958	Petrolul Ploieşti	H	0-1
17	4 May 1958	Progresul București	H	2-1
18	11 May 1958	Steagul Roşu Oraşul Stalin	A	4-1
19	18 May 1958	CS Târgu Mureş	H	1-0
20	5 June 1958	CCA București	A	0-2
21	8 June 1958	Jiul Petroşani	A	1-0
22	15 June 1958	CS Oradea	H	3-0

Cupa României
Round	Date	Opponent	Stadium	Result
Last 32	6 April 1958	Farul Constanţa	Brăila	0-1

== Transfers ==
Dinamo transferred in Cornel Popa and Vasile Alexandru from Dinamo Bacău, Iosif Lazăr from Dinamo Oraşul Stalin and Gheorghe Cosma from Progresul. The new manager, Iuliu Baratky, promotes Ion Motroc and Petre Babone from the second team. Gheorghe and Ladislau Băcuț, and Florea Birtașu are transferred out.
