= 1950 FC Dinamo București season =

FC Dinamo București
1950 season
- Manager: Iuliu Baratky
- Divizia A: 8th
- Cupa României: Quarterfinals

The 1950 season was Dinamo București's second season in Divizia A. Because of the system's switch to spring-autumn, between 1948 and 1949 and 1950 championships, Dinamo participated in the Fall Cup. The team played in the 5th Serie, and they won eight matches, draw one and lose one, at home with CFR București.

Dinamo finished the championship in 8th place with 21 points. Constantin Popescu ranked third in the top scorer with 14 goals scored.

== Results ==
Divizia A
Round	Date	Opponent	Stadium	Result
1	19 March 1950	CCA București	H	2-2
2	26 March 1950	Flamura Roşie Arad	A	0-2
3	2 April 1950	Locomotiva Timişoara	H	2-0
4	10 April 1950	Locomotiva București	A	2-4
5	16 April 1950	Partizanul Petroşani	H	5-3
6	23 April 1950	Progresul ICO Oradea	A	0-1
7	28 May 1950	CSU Timişoara	A	3-2
8	4 June 1950	Locomotiva Târgu Mureş	H	3-2
9	10 June 1950	Partizanul București	A	4-3
10	18 June 1950	Locomotiva Sibiu	A	1-2
11	25 June 1950	Metalul Reşiţa	A	0-2
12	13 August 1950	CCA București	A	1-0
13	20 August 1950	Flamura Roşie Arad	H	1-3
14	27 August 1950	Locomotiva Timişoara	A	3-1
15	2 September 1950	Locomotiva București	H	3-5
16	1 October 1950	Partizanul Petroşani	A	0-0
17	17 October 1950	Progresul ICO Oradea	H	0-2
18	24 October 1950	Ştiinţa Timişoara	H	2-3
19	29 October 1950	Locomotiva Târgu Mureş	A	0-2
20	4 November 1950	Partizanul București	H	2-2
21	12 November 1950	Locomotiva Sibiu	H	2-1
22	19 November 1950	Metalul Reşiţa	H	2-1

Cupa României
Round	Date	Opponent	Stadium	Result
Last 32	2 July 1950	Partizanul Ploieşti	A	4-2
Last 16	17 August 1950	Partizanul București	H	1-1
Last 16 (replay)	7 September 1950	Partizanul București	H	4-3
Quarterfinals	12 October 1950	Progresul ICO Oradea	A	1-2

== Squad ==
Standard team: Petre Ivan – Florian Ambru, Caius Novac – Gheorghe Băcuț, Constantin Marinescu, Angelo Niculescu (Ion Șiclovan) – Nicolae Voinescu (Iuliu Farkaș), Carol Bartha, Titus Ozon, Nicolae Dumitru, Constantin Popescu (Vasile Naciu).

=== Transfers ===
Gheorghe Băcuț (UTA), Constantin Marinescu (Jiul Petroşani), Nicolae Dumitru, Nicolae Voinescu and Constantin "Titi" Popescu were brought from Metalul București, along with the coach Iuliu Baratky. Simionescu was transferred to Locomotiva București, and Farkaș to Partizanul Petroşani.
