= 1965–66 FC Dinamo București season =

FC Dinamo București
1965–66 season
- Manager: Angelo Niculescu
- Divizia A: 3rd
- Romanian Cup: Quarter-finalist
- European Cup: First round
- Top goalscorer: Gheorghe Ene (15)

The 1965–66 season was FC Dinamo București's 17th season in Divizia A. After four consecutive championships, Dinamo finishes only third this time. In the European Cup, Dinamo meets again Internazionale Milano. Despite winning the home game, Dinamo is eliminated by the title holder.

== Results ==
Divizia A
| Round | Date | Opponent | Stadium | Result |
|---|---|---|---|---|
| 1 | 15 August 1965 | Siderurgistul Galaţi | A | 3-2 |
| 2 | 22 August 1965 | Ştiinţa Timişoara | H | 2-3 |
| 3 | 29 August 1965 | Steagul Roşu Braşov | A | 1-4 |
| 4 | 5 September 1965 | Rapid București | H | 0-2 |
| 5 | 5 December 1965 | Ştiinţa Cluj | H | 4-0 |
| 6 | 26 September 1965 | Dinamo Piteşti | A | 1-2 |
| 7 | 3 October 1965 | Steaua București | A | 3-3 |
| 8 | 10 October 1965 | Crişul Oradea | H | 3-0 |
| 9 | 13 October 1965 | UTA | A | 0-3 |
| 10 | 31 October 1965 | Ştiinţa Craiova | A | 0-0 |
| 11 | 7 November 1965 | Petrolul Ploieşti | H | 2-1 |
| 12 | 10 November 1965 | CSMS Iaşi | H | 0-1 |
| 13 | 27 November 1965 | Farul Constanţa | A | 1-1 |
| 14 | 20 March 1966 | Siderurgistul Galaţi | H | 4-0 |
| 15 | 27 March 1966 | FC Politehnica Timișoara | A | 1-0 |
| 16 | 31 March 1966 | Steagul Roşu Braşov | H | 1-0 |
| 17 | 10 April 1966 | Rapid București | A | 0-0 |
| 18 | 17 April 1966 | U Cluj | A | 1-2 |
| 19 | 2 May 1966 | Dinamo Piteşti | H | 1-1 |
| 20 | 8 May 1966 | Steaua București | H | 1-1 |
| 21 | 15 May 1966 | Crişul Oradea | A | 0-0 |
| 22 | 22 May 1966 | UTA | H | 0-1 |
| 23 | 5 June 1966 | Ştiinţa Craiova | H | 8-0 |
| 24 | 12 June 1966 | Petrolul Ploieşti | A | 2-2 |
| 25 | 26 June 1966 | CSMS Iaşi | A | 2-1 |
| 26 | 10 July 1966 | Farul Constanţa | H | 4-3 |

Cupa României
| Round | Date | Opponent | Stadium | Result |
|---|---|---|---|---|
| Last 32 | 13 March 1966 | Vagonul Arad | A | 2-1 |
| Last 16 | 11 May 1966 | U Cluj | Mediaş | 3-1 |
| Quarter-finals | 22 June 1966 | Steaua București | București | 0-2 |

== European Cup ==
Preliminary round – first leg

28 September 1965

| Dinamo București | 4 – 0 | (Denmark) Boldklubben 1909 |
|---|---|---|
| G.Ene 50'; Gergely 75'; Frăţilă 85', 88' |

Stadionul Republicii, Bucharest
Attendance: 9,812
Referee: Stjepan Varazdinec (Yugoslavia)

Second leg

6 October 1965

| Boldklubben 1909 | 2 – 3 | Dinamo București |
|---|---|---|
| Petersen 29'; A.Hansen 35' | | R.Nunweiller 8'; Pîrcălab 15'; G.Ene 44' |

Gillested Park, Odense
Attendance: 7,596
Referee: Jean Tricot (France)

First round – first leg

1 December 1965
14:00

| Dinamo București | 2 – 1 | Internazionale |
|---|---|---|
| Frăţilă 25'; Haidu 51' | | Peiró 12' |

Stadionul 23 August, Bucharest
Attendance: 18,912
Referee: Karl Keller (Switzerland)

Second leg

16 December 1965

| Internazionale (Italy) | 2 – 0 | Dinamo București |
|---|---|---|
| Mazzola 47' (pen.); Facchetti 87' |

San Siro, Milan
Attendance: 15,324
Referee: Franz Mayer (Austria)

== Squad ==
Goalkeepers: Ilie Datcu, Iuliu Uțu.

Defenders: Dumitru Ivan, Ion Nunweiller, Lică Nunweiller, Lazăr Pârvu, Cornel Popa, Mircea Stoenescu, Constantin Ștefan.

Midfielders: Vasile Gergely, Emil Petru, Octavian Popescu.

Forwards: Florea Dumitrache, Gheorghe Ene, Constantin Frățilă, Gheorghe Grozea, Ion Haidu, Vasile Ionescu, Mircea Lucescu, Radu Nunweiller, Ion Pîrcălab, Aurel Unguroiu, Iosif Varga.

== Transfers ==
Mircea Stoenescu and Iosif Varga are brought from Dinamo Piteşti. Varga and Marcel Pigulea are suspended for six months by the club. Florea Dumitrache made his debut in the first squad.
