= 1959–60 FC Dinamo București season =

FC Dinamo București
1959–60 season
- Manager: Iuliu Baratky (Rounds 1-9), Traian Ionescu
- Divizia A: 8th
- Romanian Cup: Quarterfinals

The 1959–60 season was Dinamo București's 11th season in Divizia A. Dinamo finished eighth in the championship, closer to relegation zone than to the title. Dinamo won only 3 of 11 home games. After the loss against Rapid in the 9th day, Iuliu Baratky was sacked and replaced by Traian Ionescu.

After the derby against CCA, won by Dinamo 2–1, both teams sent an open letter to the fans, apologising for the poor show that they offered, and promised that in the future they would play more respectable football.

== Results ==
Divizia A
Round	Date	Opponent	Stadium	Result
1	16 August 1959	Ştiinţa Cluj	A	1–2
2	23 August 1959	Minerul Lupeni	H	0–0
3	6 September 1959	CCA București	H	2–1
4	13 September 1959	UTA	A	0–2
5	20 September 1959	Dinamo Bacău	H	0–2
6	27 September 1959	Progresul București	A	1–1
7	11 October 1959	Petrolul Ploieşti	A	2–0
8	18 October 1959	Steagul Roşu Oraşul Stalin	H	2–2
9	25 October 1959	Rapid București	A	0–1
10	15 November 1959	Jiul Petroşani	A	0–0
11	22 November 1959	Farul Constanţa	H	1–1
12	6 March 1960	Ştiinţa Cluj	H	0–0
13	13 March 1960	Minerul Lupeni	A	2–2
14	20 March 1960	CCA București	A	3–3
15	27 March 1960	UTA	H	2–2
16	3 April 1960	Dinamo Bacău	A	4–1
17	10 April 1960	Progresul București	H	0–1
18	2 June 1960	Petrolul Ploieşti	H	1–3
19	8 May 1960	Steagul Roşu Oraşul Stalin	A	2–1
20	5 June 1960	Rapid București	H	2–0
21	12 June 1960	Jiul Petroşani	H	3–1
22	19 June 1960	Farul Constanţa	A	1–3

Cupa României
Round	Date	Opponent	Stadium	Result
Last 32	29 November 1959	Metalul Târgovişte	Ploieşti	4–3
Last 16	6 December 1959	Prahova Ploieşti	Târgovişte	3–1
Quarterfinals	15 June 1960	Ştiinţa Timişoara	Sibiu	0–1

== Transfers ==
Before the start of the season Dinamo bought Haralambie Eftimie (from Dinamo Bacău). Dumitru Ivan and Lică Nunweiller are promoted from the Tineretul Dinamovist (Young Dinamo player).
