= 1948–49 FC Dinamo București season =

FC Dinamo București
1948–49 season
- Manager: Coloman Braun-Bogdan (rounds 1-12), Ştefan Wetzer (round 13), Rudolf Wetzer (rounds 14-26)
- Divizia A: 8th
- Cupa României: Last 32

The 1948–49 season was Dinamo București's first season in Divizia A. In this season, Dinamo competed in Liga I, Cupa României and UEFA Europa League. The newly formed team played under the name Dinamo A. Coloman Braun-Bogdan, the former manager of Romania national team, is installed as coach. A group of players is brought, among which Angelo Niculescu, ex-player of FC Craiova and Carmen București, who was to end his career at the end of the season, and Titus Ozon.

Dinamo will conclude on the 8th place with 28 points.

In the same season, the club's second team, Dinamo B, finished first place in the 2nd series of the second division, but had no right to promotion in Divizia A, because it was the second representative from the same town of the same club.

== Results ==
Divizia A
Round	Date	Opponent	Stadium	Result
1	22 August 1948	Jiul Petroşani	H	4-1
2	28 August 1948	Metalochimic București	H	5-3
3	5 September 1948	CSM Mediaş	A	1-1
4	9 September 1948	CFR București	H	0-1
5	19 September 1948	Universitatea Cluj	A	1-1
6	23 September 1948	Politehnica Timişoara	H	3-2
7	3 October 1948	ICO Oradea	A	1-2
8	16 October 1948	RATA Târgu Mureş	H	2-2
9	6 November 1948	Petrolul București	A	1-3
10	14 November 1948	ITA Arad	H	2-0
11	21 November 1948	CSCA București	A	1-0
12	28 November 1948	CFR Cluj	H	1-0
13	5 December 1948	CFR Timişoara	A	0-2
14	27 February 1949	Jiul Petroşani	A	2-3
15	19 March 1949	Metalochimic București	A	4-1
16	27 March 1949	Gaz Metan Mediaş	H	1-2
17	2 April 1949	CFR București	A	2-5
18	10 April 1949	CSU Cluj	H	2-2
19	17 April 1949	CSU Timişoara	A	3-1
20	28 May 1949	ICO Oradea	H	5-2
21	15 June 1949	RATA Târgu Mureş	A	2-2
22	11 June 1949	Petrolul București	H	3-5
23	19 June 1949	ITA Arad	A	0-4
24	29 June 1949	CSCA București	H	3-3
25	3 July 1949	CFR Cluj	A	5-2
26	9 July 1949	CFR Timişoara	H	1-0

Cupa României
Round	Date	Opponent	Stadium	Result
Last 32	4 September 1949	Arsenal Sibiu	A	1-2

== Squad ==
Standard team: Petre Ivan (Gheorghe Lăzăreanu) – Florian Ambru, Caius Novac (Cornel Simionescu) – Dumitru Ignat, Angelo Niculescu (Gheorghe Teodorescu), Ion Șiclovan – Iuliu Farkaș, Titus Ozon, Carol Bartha (Marin Apostol), Jack Moisescu, Vasile Naciu (Alexandru Petculescu).

== Transfers 1948-49 ==
=== Transfers in ===
Date	Position	Nationality	Name	From	Fee	Ref.
July 1948	GK	(Romania)	Petre Ivan	FC Ploiești	Unknown	
July 1948	GK	(Romania)	Gheorghe Lăzăreanu	ASA București	Unknown	

=== Transfers out ===
Date	Position	Nationality	Name	To	Fee	Ref.
