= 1966–67 FC Dinamo București season =

FC Dinamo București
1966–67 season
- Manager: Traian Ionescu
- Divizia A: 2nd
- Romanian Cup: Last 16

The 1966–67 season was FC Dinamo București's 18th season in Divizia A. Because of the disappointing previous season, manager Angelo Niculescu is replaced by Traian Ionescu who begines to reconstruct the team, relying more on young players such as Dumitrache, Lucescu or Dinu. Dinamo fights for the title but loses the battle with Rapid in the last day of the championship.

== Results ==
Divizia A
Round	Date	Opponent	Stadium	Result
1	21 August 1966	Universitatea Craiova	H	4-1
2	28 August 1966	Dinamo Piteşti	A	3-1
3	4 September 1966	Steaua București	H	1-1
4	11 September 1966	Universitatea Cluj	H	4-0
5	14 September 1966	Petrolul Ploieşti	A	0-3
6	25 September 1966	Steagul Roşu Braşov	H	0-1
7	2 October 1966	Rapid București	H	2-1
8	9 October 1966	Politehnica Timişoara	A	2-4
9	23 October 1966	CSMS Iaşi	H	2-1
10	6 November 1966	Farul Constanţa	A	1-2
11	9 November 1966	Progresul București	H	2-0
12	13 November 1966	Jiul Petroşani	H	1-0
13	29 November 1966	UTA	A	0-0
14	26 February 1967	Universitatea Craiova	A	1-1
15	12 March 1967	Dinamo Piteşti	H	2-0
16	15 March 1967	Steaua București	A	0-1
17	26 March 1967	Universitatea Cluj	A	0-0
18	2 April 1967	Petrolul Ploieşti	H	1-0
19	9 April 1967	Steagul Roşu Braşov	A	0-1
20	16 April 1967	Rapid București	A	0-2
21	30 April 1967	Politehnica Timişoara	H	1-0
22	7 May 1967	CSMS Iaşi	A	0-0
23	14 May 1967	Farul Constanţa	H	5-2
24	28 May 1967	Progresul București	A	2-0
25	4 June 1967	Jiul Petroşani	A	3-0
26	11 June 1967	UTA	H	1-1

Cupa României
Round	Date	Opponent	Stadium	Result
Last 32	5 March 1967	Voinţa Reghin	A	2-0
Last 16	5 April 1967	Progresul București	București	0-1

== Squad ==
Goalkeepers: Ilie Datcu, Spiridon Niculescu.

Defenders: Dumitru Ivan, Ion Nunweiller, Lică Nunweiller, Lazăr Pârvu, Cornel Popa, Mircea Stoenescu.

Midfielders: Cornel Dinu, Vasile Gergely, Gheorghe Grozea, Octavian Popescu, Constantin Ștefan.

Forwards: Florea Dumitrache, Daniel Ene, Gheorghe Ene, Constantin Frățilă, Ion Haidu, Radu Nunweiller, Petre Nuțu, Ion Pîrcălab, Iosif Varga.

== Transfers ==
Emil Petru is transferred to Universitatea Cluj. Mircea Lucescu is loaned to Politehnica București. Cornel Dinu is brought from Targoviste.
