= Nicolae Selymes =

Romanian footballer

Personal information
- Date of birth: 11 March 1940 (age 86)
- Place of birth: Romania
- Position: Forward

Senior career*
Years	Team	Apps	(Gls)
1961–1968	Steagul Roșu Brașov	99	(13)
1963	→ Dinamo București (loan)	8	(2)
Total		107	(15)

International career
1962	Romania	1	(0)
- * Club domestic league appearances and goals

Nicolae Selymes (born 11 March 1940) is a Romanian former footballer who played as a forward. He is the uncle of Tibor Selymes who was also an international footballer.

== International career ==
Nicolae Selymes played one game for Romania's national team when coach Silviu Ploeșteanu used him in a 1–3 loss against Morocco, sending him in the 70th minute of the game in order to replace Nicolae Tătaru.

== Honours ==
Dinamo București

- Divizia A: 1962–63
