= 1998–99 FC Dinamo București season =

FC Dinamo București
1998–99 season
- Head coach: Cornel Dinu
- Divizia A: 2nd
- Romanian Cup: Semi-finals
- Top goalscorer: Adrian Mihalcea (18 goals)

The 1998–99 season was FC Dinamo București's 50th season in Divizia A. Dinamo finished 2nd in the league and reached the semi-finals of the Romanian Cup.

== Players ==
=== Squad information ===
Squad at end of season

Note: Flags indicate national team as defined under FIFA eligibility rules; some limited exceptions apply. Players may hold more than one non-FIFA nationality.

No.	Pos.	Nation	Player
1	GK	ROU	Ștefan Preda
2	DF	ROU	Cosmin Contra
3	DF	ROU	Liviu Ciobotariu
4	DF	ROU	Florin Bătrânu
5	MF	ROU	Daniel Iftodi
6	DF	ROU	Gheorghe Mihali
7	MF	ROU	Augustin Călin
8	MF	ROU	Florentin Petre
9	FW	ROU	Adrian Mihalcea
10	MF	ROU	Ionuț Lupescu
11	MF	ROU	Cătălin Hîldan

No.	Pos.	Nation	Player
12	GK	MAR	Khalid Fouhami
14	FW	ROU	Ionel Gane
15	FW	ROU	Ion Vlădoiu
16	FW	ROU	Marius Niculae
17	MF	ROU	Giani Kiriţă
19	DF	ROU	Cornel Dobre
20	DF	ROU	Daniel Florea
21	FW	ROU	Bogdan Aldea
23	FW	ROU	Adrian Mutu
25	MF	ROU	Iulian Tameş
26	DF	ROU	Cristian Utfineanț

== League table ==
Pos	Team	Pld	W	D	L	GF	GA	GD	Pts	Qualification or relegation
1	Rapid București (C)	34	28	5	1	79	18	+61	89	Qualification to Champions League second qualifying round
2	Dinamo București	34	26	4	4	95	27	+68	82	Qualification to UEFA Cup qualifying round
3	Steaua București	34	19	9	6	62	33	+29	66	Qualification to UEFA Cup qualifying round
4	Argeș Pitești	34	20	4	10	57	37	+20	64	
5	Bacău	34	18	8	8	46	35	+11	62	Qualification to Intertoto Cup first round
6	Oțelul Galați	34	17	4	13	47	33	+14	55 (Note: OTE 3-2 PRO; PRO 0-1 OTE)	
7	Național București	34	18	1	15	61	51	+10	55	
8	Petrolul Ploiești	34	16	5	13	50	46	+4	53	
9	Ceahlăul Piatra Neamț	34	15	4	15	54	53	+1	49	Qualification to Intertoto Cup first round
10	Astra Ploiești	34	13	7	14	40	38	+2	46	
11	Gloria Bistrița	34	12	7	15	55	60	−5	43	
12	Farul Constanța	34	12	4	18	37	54	−17	40	
13	Universitatea Craiova	34	11	6	17	43	50	−7	39 (Note: CRA 4-2 ONE; ONE 3-2 CRA)	
14	FC Onești	34	12	3	19	56	67	−11	39	
15	Reșița	34	8	11	15	34	59	−25	35	
16	Foresta Suceava (R)	34	6	6	22	31	61	−30	24	Relegation to Divizia B
17	Universitatea Cluj (R)	34	4	4	26	19	92	−73	16	Relegation to Divizia B
18	Olimpia Satu Mare (R)	34	3	4	27	22	74	−52	13	Relegation to Divizia B

Source: LT (in Romanian)
Rules for classification: 1) points; 2) head-to-head points; 3) head-to-head goal difference; 4) head-to-head goals scored; 5) goal difference; 6) number of goals scored.
(C) Champions; (R) Relegated

== Results ==
Dinamo's score comes first

=== Legend ===
Win	Draw	Loss

=== Cupa României ===
Round	Date	Opponent	Venue	Result	Goalscorers
R of 32	21 October 1998	ASA Târgu Mureș	A	1–0	
R of 16	18 November 1998	Ceahlăul Piatra Neamț	H	3–0	
QF - 1st leg	2 December 1998	UM Timișoara	A	1–0	
QF - 2nd leg	9 December 1998	UM Timișoara	H	2–0	
SF - 1st leg	14 April 1999	Steaua București	H	1–2	
SF - 2nd leg	5 May 1999	Steaua București	A	1–3	
