= 1980–81 FC Dinamo București season =

FC Dinamo București
1980–81 season
- Manager: Valentin Stănescu
- Divizia A: 2nd
- Romanian Cup: Last 32

The 1980–81 season was FC Dinamo București's 32nd season in Divizia A. The season brought a new manager for Dinamo, Valentin Stănescu replacing Angelo Niculescu. In the championship, Dinamo finished second, three points behind the champions Universitatea Craiova. In the Romanian Cup, Dinamo was again eliminated in the last 32 phase, this time by Corvinul Hunedoara.

== Results ==
Divizia A
Round	Date	Opponent	Stadium	Result
1	2 August 1980	Jiul Petroșani	H	3-0
2	9 August 1980	FCM Galați	A	2-0
3	16 August 1980	Corvinul Hunedoara	H	1-0
4	23 August 1980	FC Baia Mare	A	0-1
5	30 August 1980	Progresul București	H	4-0
6	6 September 1980	U Cluj	H	2-1
7	29 October 1980	FC Olt	A	1-1
8	27 September 1980	ASA Târgu Mureș	H	2-1
9	5 October 1980	Steaua București	H	0-2
10	8 October 1980	Chimia Râmnicu Vâlcea	A	2-0
11	19 October 1980	Poli Iași	H	4-0
12	26 October 1980	FC Argeş	A	1-2
13	2 November 1980	Sportul Studențesc	A	3-0
14	9 November 1980	Poli Timișoara	H	2-0
15	16 November 1980	FCM Brașov	A	1-3
16	23 November 1980	SC Bacău	H	0-0
17	30 November 1980	U Craiova	A	0-2
18	28 February 1980	Jiul Petroșani	A	1-2
19	7 March 1981	FCM Galați	H	3-1
20	14 March 1981	Corvinul Hunedoara	A	2-1
21	21 March 1981	FC Baia Mare	H	3-1
22	28 March 1981	Progresul București	A	1-1
23	4 April 1981	U Cluj	A	1-1
24	12 April 1981	FC Olt	H	3-0
25	19 April 1981	ASA Târgu Mureș	A	0-2
26	3 May 1981	Steaua București	A	1-1
27	17 May 1981	Chimia Râmnicu Vâlcea	H	2-1
28	23 May 1981	Poli Iași	A	0-2
29	27 May 1981	FC Argeş	H	2-1
30	7 June 1981	Sportul Studențesc	H	0-2
31	10 June 1981	Poli Timișoara	A	3-3
32	13 June 1981	FCM Brașov	H	3-0
33	17 June 1981	SC Bacău	A	3-1
34	21 June 1981	U Craiova	H	1-1

Cupa României
Round	Date	Opponent	Stadium	Result
Last 32	26 November 1980	Corvinul Hunedoara	Sibiu	0-1 (a.e.t.)
