= 1978–79 FC Dinamo București season =

FC Dinamo București
1978–79 season
- Manager: Ion Nunweiller
- Divizia A: 2nd
- Romanian Cup: Semifinals
- Top goalscorer: Dudu Georgescu (13 goals)

The 1978–79 season was FC Dinamo București's 30th season in Divizia A. Dinamo battled for the championship with FC Argeş until the last day when the two teams met in Bucharest. The winner was the new champion, in case of a draw, the title went to Piteşti. Dinamo took an early lead, but FC Argeş came back and in the 70th minute led 3–1. Dinamo managed to draw, 3–3 in the 89th minute, but even if the Piteşti squad would have been champions, Nicolae Dobrin secured the title with a goal in the injury time. Dinamo finished second, and in the Romanian Cup was eliminated in the semifinals by Sportul Studenţesc.

== Results ==
Divizia A
Round	Date	Opponent	Stadium	Result
1	24 August 1978	FC Baia Mare	A	0–2
2	27 August 1978	UTA	H	0–0
3	3 September 1978	ASA Târgu Mureș	A	1–2
4	10 September 1978	Gloria Buzău	H	4–0
5	12 September 1978	Sportul Studențesc	A	1–1
6	24 September 1978	CS Târgoviște	A	2–1
7	1 October 1978	Corvinul Hunedoara	H	4–0
8	7 October 1978	Olimpia Satu Mare	A	0–1
9	15 October 1978	FC Bihor	H	1–0
10	28 October 1978	Jiul Petroșani	A	1–1
11	5 November 1978	Poli Timișoara	H	1–1
12	19 November 1978	Chimia Râmnicu Vâlcea	A	0–0
13	22 November 1978	U Craiova	H	1–0
14	26 November 1978	Steaua București	H	1–1
15	29 November 1978	SC Bacău	A	0–1
16	3 December 1978	Poli Iași	H	3–1
17	10 December 1978	FC Argeş	A	0–1
18	4 March 1979	FC Baia Mare	H	1–0
19	7 March 1979	UTA	A	3–1
20	11 March 1979	ASA Târgu Mureș	H	1–0
21	17 March 1979	Gloria Buzău	A	0–0
22	25 March 1979	Sportul Studențesc	H	3–1
23	28 March 1979	CS Târgoviște	H	2–0
24	8 April 1979	Corvinul Hunedoara	A	0–1
25	11 April 1979	Olimpia Satu Mare	H	3–1
26	22 April 1979	FC Bihor	A	1–1
27	25 April 1979	Jiul Petroșani	H	5–1
28	29 April 1979	Poli Timișoara	A	1–0
29	6 May 1979	Chimia Râmnicu Vâlcea	H	2–0
30	20 May 1979	U Craiova	A	0–2
31	6 June 1979	Steaua București	A	1–2
32	10 June 1979	SC Bacău	H	4–0
33	17 June 1979	Poli Iași	A	1–1
34	24 June 1979	FC Argeş	H	3–4

Cupa României
Round	Date	Opponent	Stadium	Result
Last 32	28 February 1979	Muscelul Câmpulung	A	2–1
Last 16	16 May 1979	Poli Iași	Sibiu	5–3
Quarter finals	13 June 1979	FCM Galați	Buzău	3–1
Semifinals	27 June 1979	Sportul Studențesc	București	0–1
