= Gheorghe Toma =

Romanian footballer

Personal information
- Date of birth: 1929
- Position: Defender

Senior career*
Years	Team	Apps	(Gls)
1950	Petrolul Ploiești	1	(0)
1952	Unirea Tricolor București	6	(0)
1953–1956	Dinamo București	66	(2)
1957–1958	Progresul București	2	(0)
1958–1960	Farul Constanța	24	(2)
Total		99	(4)

International career
1955	Romania	1	(0)
- * Club domestic league appearances and goals

Gheorghe Toma (born 1929 in Bucharest, date of death 1994, Bucharest), was a Romanian footballer who played as a defender.

== International career ==
Gheorghe Toma played one friendly match for Romania, on 29 May 1955 under coach Gheorghe Popescu I in a 2–2 against Poland.

== Honours ==
Dinamo București

- Divizia A: 1955
