= Petre Babone =

Romanian footballer and manager

Personal information
- Date of birth: 14 March 1935 (age 91)
- Place of birth: Băicoi, Romania
- Position: Striker

Youth career
- 1950–1951: ACC Câmpina

Senior career*
Years	Team	Apps	(Gls)
1951–1954	Metalul Plopeni		
1955	Metalul 108 Cugir		
1956–1957	Dinamo 6 București		
1957–1958	Dinamo Bucureşti	7	(4)
1958–1961	Petrolul Ploiești	51	(18)
1961	Prahova Ploiești		
1962	Petrolul Ploiești	5	(1)
1962–1963	Prahova Ploiești		
1965–1968	Metalul Plopeni		
1968–1971	Metalul Liliești		
Total		63	(23)

International career
1958	Romania B	1	(0)
1959	Romania Olympic	1	(0)

Managerial career
- 1968–1971: Metalul Liliești
- 1971–1972: Petrolul Băicoi
- * Club domestic league appearances and goals

Petre Babone (born 14 March 1935) is a Romanian former football striker and manager.

== International career ==
In 1958 Petre Babone played in a friendly game for Romania's B team which ended with a 1–0 loss against East Germany. In 1959 he played one friendly game for Romania's Olympic team which ended with a 2–0 loss against Soviet Union.

== Honours ==
Petrolul Ploiești

- Divizia A: 1958–59
