= Valeriu Neagu =

Romanian footballer

Personal information
- Date of birth: 26 April 1930 (age 96)
- Position: Striker

Senior career*
Years	Team	Apps	(Gls)
1948–1950	Flacăra București		
1951–1953	Dinamo Brașov		
1954–1958	Dinamo București		

International career
1954	Romania	1	(0)

Managerial career
- 1966–1969: Chimia Suceava
- 1969–1970: Dinamo Bacău
- 1971: Oțelul Galați
- 1972–1975: Boluspor
- 1976–1977: Boluspor
- 1982–1983: Antalyaspor
- 1984–1985: Eskişehirspor
- 1985–1987: Boluspor
- * Club domestic league appearances and goals

Valeriu Neagu (born 26 April 1930) was a Romanian footballer who played as a striker.

== Playing career ==
While playing for Dinamo București Valeriu Neagu was used by coach Angelo Niculescu in 23 matches in which he scored 10 goals, including a brace in a 2–1 win over rivals Steaua București in the 1955 Divizia A season, helping the team win the first title in the club's history. He played in the 1954 Cupa României final which was lost by Dinamo with 2–0 in front of Metalul Reșița and played in the first European campaign of a Romanian team in the 1956–57 European Cup in the 3–1 victory against Galatasaray, helping The Red Dogs go to the next phase of the competition where they were eliminated by CDNA Sofia, against whom he scored a goal, having a total of three appearances in the campaign.

Valeriu Neagu played one friendly match for Romania, on 19 September 1954 when coach Ștefan Dobay sent him on the field in order to replace Stere Zeană in the 72nd minute of a 5–1 loss against Hungary.

== Managerial career ==
While coaching Dinamo Bacău, Neagu together with Constantin Rădulescu led them in the 1969–70 Inter-Cities Fairs Cup campaign where they eliminated Floriana, Skeid and Kilmarnock, reaching the quarter-finals where they were eliminated by Arsenal who would eventually win the competition. He went to coach in Turkey at Boluspor, Antalyaspor and Eskişehirspor, obtaining his biggest performance in Turkish football when he managed to qualify Boluspor in the 1974–75 UEFA Cup, where he got eliminated in the first round by his former team, Dinamo București.

== Honours ==
=== Player ===
Dinamo București

- Divizia A: 1955
- Cupa României runner-up: 1954

=== Manager ===
Boluspor

- Turkish Second Football League: 1985–86
