= Ion Țîrcovnicu =

Romanian footballer

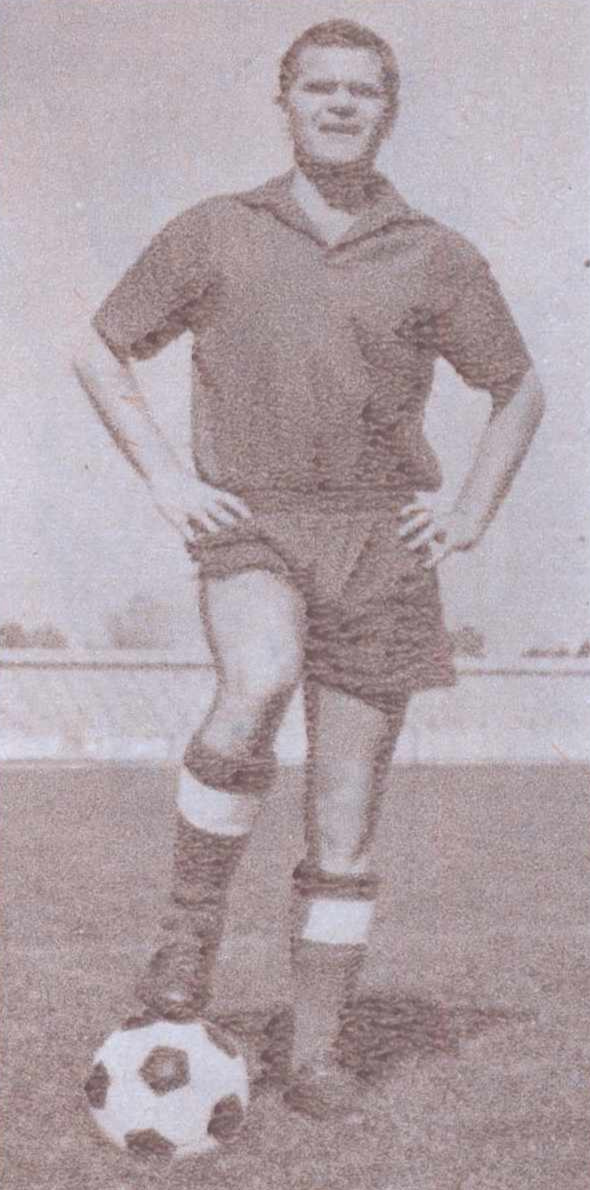

Personal information
- Date of birth: 7 April 1936
- Place of birth: Bucharest, Romania
- Date of death: 10 March 2003 (aged 66)
- Height: 1.68 m (5 ft 6 in)
- Position: Forward

Senior career*
Years	Team	Apps	(Gls)
1954	Voința București		
1955	Progresul CPCS București		
1956	Progresul București	11	(3)
1957	Dinamo 6 București		
1957–1958	Dinamo Cluj	20	(1)
1958–1960	Dinamo Bacău	31	(7)
1960–1964	Dinamo București	82	(28)
1965–1967	Dinamo Pitești	57	(4)
Total		201	(43)

International career
1963	Romania (Note: Including two appearances and one goal for Romania's Olympic team.)	3	(1)
- * Club domestic league appearances and goals

Ion Țîrcovnicu (7 April 1936 – 10 March 2003) was a Romanian football forward.

== Club career ==
Țîrcovnicu was born on 7 April 1936 in Bucharest, Romania and began playing football in 1954 at local club Voința in Divizia B. In 1955 he went to Progresul CPCS București, also in the second league. One year later he signed with Progresul București where he made his Divizia A debut on 2 April 1956 under coach Gheorghe Nicolae in a 2–1 home loss to Flamura Roșie Arad in which he scored his side's goal. Subsequently, he went for a short period to Dinamo 6 București, then he played one season for Dinamo Cluj and two seasons for Dinamo Bacău.

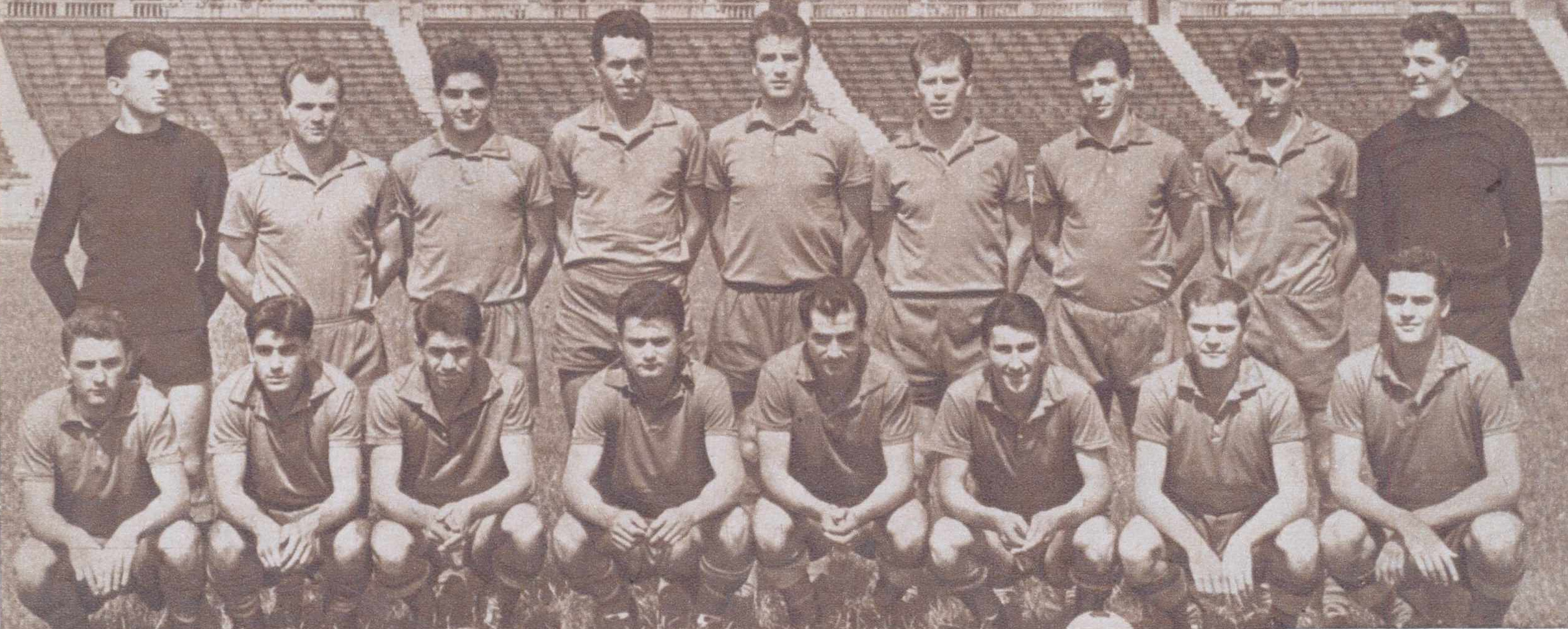
Țîrcovnicu (second from right, front row) with Dinamo București in 1963

In 1960, Țîrcovnicu signed with Dinamo București where in his first season he scored a personal record of 11 goals, including one in a 3–2 derby loss to Steaua București, as the team finished the season in second place. In the following season he worked with three coaches, Traian Ionescu, Constantin Teașcă and Nicolae Dumitru, scoring five goals in 20 appearances, as the team won the title. Then he made his debut in European competitions, appearing in a 1–1 draw against Galatasaray in the 1962–63 European Cup. He also scored seven goals in the 27 league appearances under coaches Ionescu and Dumitru, including one goal in a draw against Steaua, contributing to the team's second title win. In the 1963–64 European Cup he played three games, scoring one goal in a 1–0 victory against East Germany champion, Motor Jena, being eliminated in the next round by Real Madrid against whom he also scored once. In the same season, Țîrcovnicu helped Dinamo win The Double, coaches Ionescu and Dumitru giving him 17 appearances in which he scored five goals, but he was not used in the 5–3 win over Steaua in the 1964 Cupa României final.

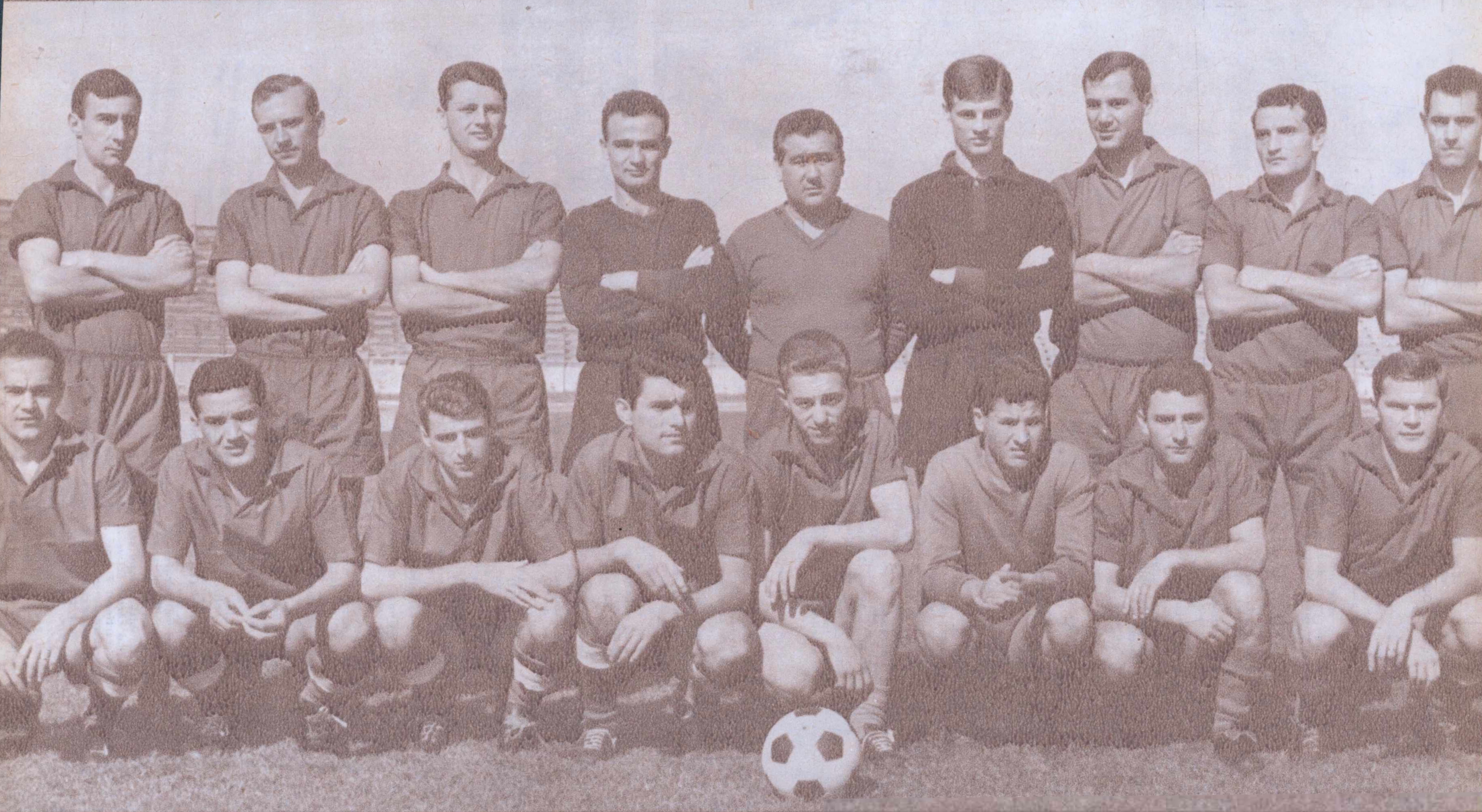
Țîrcovnicu (first from right, front row) with Dinamo Pitești in 1965

He started the 1964–65 season with The Red Dogs, but moved during the season to Dinamo Pitești, the team managing to win the title without him. During his first season spent at Pitești, the team reached the 1965 Cupa României final, coach Virgil Mărdărescu using him the entire match in the 2–1 loss to Știința Cluj. He played three games in the 1966–67 Inter-Cities Fairs Cup campaign, as in the first two rounds they eliminated Sevilla and Toulouse, being defeated in the third round with 1–0 on aggregate by Dinamo Zagreb who eventually won the competition. Țîrcovnicu made his last Divizia A appearance on 1 June 1967 in Dinamo Pitești's 4–2 home loss to Universitatea Cluj, totaling 201 appearances with 43 goals in the competition and seven appearances with two goals in European competitions (including three appearances in the Inter-Cities Fairs Cup).

== International career ==
Țîrcovnicu played one friendly game for Romania on 9 October 1963 when coach Silviu Ploeșteanu used him as a starter in a 0–0 draw against Turkey. He also appeared in two matches for Romania's Olympic team. These were a 2–1 friendly victory against Yugoslavia in which he scored his side's first goal, and a 3–2 loss to Denmark in the 1964 Summer Olympics qualifiers.

== Death ==
Țîrcovnicu died on 10 March 2003 at age 66.

== Honours ==
Dinamo București

- Divizia A: 1961–62, 1962–63, 1963–64, 1964–65
- Cupa României: 1963–64

Dinamo Pitești

- Cupa României runner-up: 1964–65
