= Iosif Szökő =

Romanian footballer

Personal information
- Date of birth: 18 March 1930
- Place of birth: Marghita, Romania
- Date of death: 1 April 2002 (aged 72)
- Place of death: Bucharest, Romania
- Position: Forward

Senior career*
Years	Team	Apps	(Gls)
1945–1947	Bihoreana Marghita		
1947–1948	CFR Oradea		
1948–1950	ICO Oradea	12	(0)
1951–1960	Dinamo București	95	(10)
Total		107+	(10+)

International career^{‡}
1953–1956	Romania	11	(0)

Managerial career
- 1962–1963: Dinamo Pitești (assistant)
- 1963–1970: Dinamo București (assistant & youth)
- * Club domestic league appearances and goals as of 14 November 2019 ‡ National team caps and goals as of 14 November 2019

Iosif Szökő (18 March 1930 – 1 April 2002) was a Romanian footballer of Hungarian descent, who played as a forward for Romania national football team and teams such ICO Oradea and Dinamo București.

== Club career ==
Szökő was born on 18 March 1930 in Marghita, Bihor County, Romania and began playing county level football in 1945 at local club Bihoreana. After some friendly games against Rapid București, CFR Oradea and ICO Oradea, young Szökő was transferred by CFR Oradea, a team against whom he scored three goals. Then, after a third place in the 1947–48 Divizia B season, he moved to ICO Oradea. There, he made his Divizia A debut on 19 March 1950 under coach Gusztáv Juhász in a 4–1 home win against Locomotiva Sibiu.

In 1951 he joined Dinamo București, and his first performance was reaching the 1954 Cupa României final where coach Angelo Niculescu used him the entire match in the 2–0 loss to Metalul Reșița. In the following season, Szökő helped the club win its first title, being used by Niculescu in 18 matches in which he scored once. He would go on to win the 1958–59 Cupa României, but coach Iuliu Baratky did not use him in the final. During his years spent with Dinamo, Szökő scored once in a derby against CCA București that ended in a 2–2 draw. He made his last Divizia A appearance on 20 September 1959 in Dinamo's 2–0 home loss to Dinamo Bacău, totaling 107 matches with 10 goals in the competition.

== International career ==
Szökő played 11 games for Romania. He made his debut in the 1954 World Cup qualifiers under coach Gheorghe Popescu, playing in three games. The first one was a 3–1 win over Bulgaria, the second ended in a 2–1 victory against the same team and the third was a 1–0 loss to Czechoslovakia. His following eight games were friendlies, his last appearance taking place on 22 April 1956 in a 1–0 away victory against Yugoslavia.

== Coaching career ==
After retirement, Szökő started a coaching career, being the assistant coach of Virgil Mărdărescu at Dinamo Pitești. Then he worked as an assistant coach for Dinamo București, where he was also the manager of various youth squads. During the 1970s and 1980s he was an important scouter. Among the players he coached, there were names such as Dudu Georgescu and Alexandru Sătmăreanu.

== Death ==
Szökő died on 1 April 2002, aged 72.

== Honours ==
Dinamo București

- Divizia A: 1955
- Cupa României: 1958–59, runner-up 1954
