= Constantin Marinescu =

Romanian footballer

Personal information
- Date of birth: 12 February 1923
- Place of birth: Bucharest, Romania
- Date of death: Unknown
- Position: Defender

Senior career*
Years	Team	Apps	(Gls)
1940–1942	Unirea Tricolor București (Note: The Divizia A 1940–41 was the last season before World War II and the Divizia A 1946–47 was the first one after, so the appearances and goals scored during this period for Unirea Tricolor București are not official with the exception of the 1945–46 regional championship.)	6	(0)
1945–1947	Carmen București (Note: The Divizia A 1940–41 was the last season before World War II and the Divizia A 1946–47 was the first one after, so the appearances and goals scored during this period for Carmen București are not official.)	28	(0)
1947–1949	Jiul Petroșani	51	(7)
1950–1952	Dinamo București	51	(0)
1954	Corvinul Hunedoara	20	(0)
1956	Progresul București	1	(0)
Total		157	(7)

International career
1947–1949	Romania	11	(0)
- * Club domestic league appearances and goals

Constantin Marinescu (born 12 February 1923, date of death unknown) was a Romanian footballer who played as a defender.

== International career ==
Constantin Marinescu played 11 games at international level for Romania, including six at the 1947 and 1948 Balkan Cup editions.

== Honours ==
Unirea Tricolor București

- Divizia A: 1940–41
- Cupa României runner-up: 1940–41
