= Vasile Alexandru =

Romanian footballer (1935–1987)

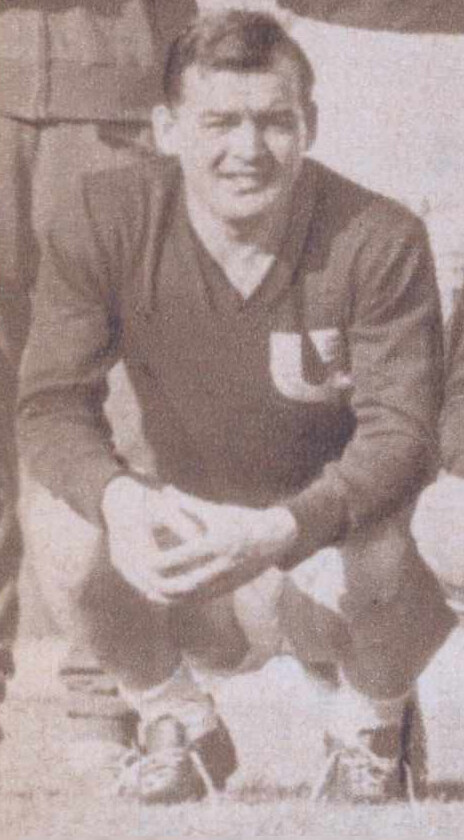
- Alexandru with U Cluj in 1966

Personal information
- Date of birth: 18 July 1935
- Place of birth: București, Romania
- Date of death: 1987
- Height: 1.74 m (5 ft 9 in)
- Position: Midfielder

Youth career
- 1949: S.E.T. București
- 1952–1955: Dinamo București

Senior career*
Years	Team	Apps	(Gls)
1955	Dinamo 6 București		
1956	Dinamo Bacău	23	(0)
1957–1962	Dinamo București (Note: The 1957 championship called Cupa Primăverii is unofficial, so the appearances and goals scored at that competition for Dinamo București are not official.)	107	(9)
1963	Dinamo Pitești (Note: The statistics for the 1962–63 Divizia B season are unavailable.)	9	(1)
1964–1967	Universitatea Cluj	65	(9)
1967–1970	CFR Cluj	49	(1)
Total		253	(20)

International career
1958–1965	Romania (Note: Including three appearances for Romania's Olympic team.)	8	(0)
- * Club domestic league appearances and goals

Vasile Alexandru (18 July 1935 – 1987) was a Romanian football midfielder who played for Romania in the 1960 European Nations' Cup.

== Club career ==
Alexandru was born on 18 July 1935 in București, Romania and began playing junior-level football in 1949 at local club S.E.T. In 1952 he moved to Dinamo București, then in 1955 he started his senior career at Divizia B club Dinamo 6 București. Shortly afterwards, he joined Dinamo Bacău, where he made his Divizia A debut on 18 March 1956 under coach Florian Ambru in a 1–0 home loss to Dinamo București. The team finished last and was relegated at the end of the season.

He then returned to Dinamo București, where he won his first trophy, the 1958–59 Cupa României, playing the entire match under coach Iuliu Baratky in the 4–0 win over CSM Baia Mare in the final. He helped the team win the 1961–62 Divizia A title, being used by coaches Traian Ionescu, Constantin Teașcă and Nicolae Dumitru in 15 games in which he scored three goals. In the following season he started to play in European competitions, appearing in both legs of the 4–1 loss on aggregate to Galatasaray in the first round of the 1962–63 European Cup. In the same season after playing 13 games and scoring one goal in the first half of the season for The Red Dogs, he left the team to go play for Divizia B side, Dinamo Pitești, the team managing to win the second consecutive title without him. He helped Pitești earn promotion to the first league in his first season. In the middle of the 1963–64 Divizia A season, he left Dinamo Pitești to go play for Universitatea Cluj. He helped "U" win the 1964–65 Cupa României, being used the full 90 minutes by coach Andrei Sepci in the 2–1 victory in the final against his former club, Dinamo Pitești. Subsequently, Alexandru played all four games in the 1965–66 European Cup Winners' Cup, helping The Red Caps eliminate Austrian team Wiener Neustadt in the first round, being eliminated in the following round by Atlético Madrid. In 1967 he switched teams again, going to Divizia B club CFR Cluj which he helped gain promotion to the first league in his second season. On 13 September 1969, Alexandru made his last Divizia A appearance, playing for CFR in a 1–0 home victory against Politehnica Iași, totaling 209 games with 20 goals in the competition.

== International career ==
Alexandru played five games for Romania, making his debut on 26 October 1958 under coach Augustin Botescu in a 2–1 friendly loss to Hungary. He played three games in the 1960 European Nations' Cup qualifiers as Romania eliminated Turkey in the round of 16, reaching the quarter-finals where they were defeated by Czechoslovakia, who advanced to the final tournament. Alexandru made his last appearance for the national team on 23 October 1965 in a 2–1 away loss to Turkey in the 1966 World Cup qualifiers.

== Style of play ==
Constantin Rădulescu described Alexandru as: "Very robust constitution, he knew very well how to use his physical strength to both dispossess and protect the ball, good technique with both feet as well as head play. He was an excellent morale booster and mobilizer."

"U" Cluj teammate, Remus Câmpeanu said about him:"He was "spleenless". He was running the whole match and after the final whistle he still had things to "arrange" with the opponents. A very good mobilizer and a player of great strength. Even if he was sick, he would reborn in the field. Everyone sympathized with him."

== Personal life ==
After ending his playing career, Alexandru worked as a dentist.

He died in 1987.

== Honours ==
Dinamo București

- Divizia A: 1961–62, 1962–63
- Cupa României: 1958–59

Dinamo Pitești

- Divizia B: 1962–63

Universitatea Cluj

- Cupa României: 1964–65

CFR Cluj

- Divizia B: 1968–69
