= Vasile Anghel =

Romanian footballer

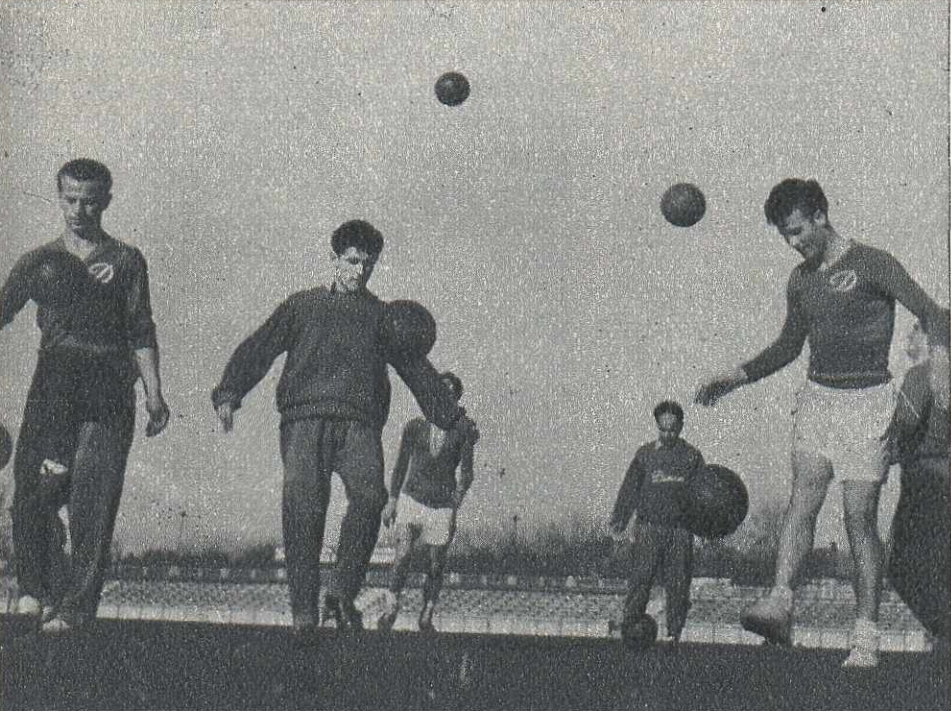
- Anghel (left) during a Dinamo training session in 1957

Personal information
- Date of birth: 22 November 1937
- Place of birth: Buzău, Romania
- Date of death: 12 September 2014 (aged 76)
- Place of death: Bucharest, Romania
- Height: 1.75 m (5 ft 9 in)
- Position: Forward

Youth career
- 1950–1954: Locomotiva CFR Buzău
- 1954: Voința București

Senior career*
Years	Team	Apps	(Gls)
1955	Progresul București		
1956–1962	Dinamo București (Note: The 1957 championship called Cupa Primăverii is unofficial, so the appearances at that competition for Dinamo București are not official.)	84	(13)
1963	Petrolul Ploiești	8	(3)
- Metalul Buzău
Total		92	(16)

International career
1957–1959	Romania (Note: Including one appearance for Romania's Olympic team)	5	(0)

Managerial career
- 1985: Dinamo București
- * Club domestic league appearances and goals

Vasile Anghel (22 November 1937 – 12 September 2014) was a Romanian footballer who played as a forward.

== Club career ==
Anghel was born on 22 November 1937 in Buzău, Romania and began playing junior-level football in 1950 at local club Locomotiva CFR. In 1954 he ended his junior period at Voința București, then he started his senior career at Divizia B club Progresul București.

Anghel joined Dinamo București where he made his Divizia A debut under coach Angelo Niculescu on 11 April 1956 in a derby against CCA București which ended with a 4–0 loss. He played in the first European match for a Romanian team during the 1956–57 European Cup, a 3–1 victory against Galatasaray. The Red Dogs advanced to the next phase of the competition where they were eliminated by CDNA Sofia, Anghel making three appearances in the campaign. He played the entire match under coach Iuliu Baratky in the 1959 Cupa României final, managing to score a goal in the 4–0 victory against CSM Baia Mare, helping Dinamo win the first Cupa României trophy in their history. In the 1961–62 season, he was used by coaches Traian Ionescu, Constantin Teașcă and Nicolae Dumitru in five games as Dinamo won the title. Then in the following season the club won another title, with Anghel being used by Ionescu and Dumitru in only three games in the first half of the season. He was transferred to Petrolul Ploiești for the second half where he won the 1962–63 Cupa României, but coach Ilie Oană did not use him in the final. Anghel made his last Divizia A appearance by playing for The Yellow Wolves on 9 June 1963 in a 2–0 away loss to Știința Timișoara, totaling 92 matches with 16 goals in the competition and five appearances in European competitions (four in the European Cup and one in the Inter-Cities Fairs Cup).

After he ended his playing career at Metalul Buzău, Anghel worked as Dinamo București's president from 1980 to 1988, a period in which the club won three league titles, two cups and reached the European Cup semi-finals in the 1983–84 edition. In 1985, he was Dinamo's head coach for several rounds. He also worked as a technical director for Petrolul Ploiești from 1988 to 1989 and Rapid București between 1989 and 1990.

== International career ==
Anghel played four games for Romania, making his debut on 1 June 1957 under coach Gheorghe Popescu in a 1–1 friendly draw against Soviet Union. His following games were a 2–1 win over Greece and a 1–1 draw against Yugoslavia in the 1958 World Cup qualifiers. His last appearance for the national team took place on 26 April 1959 in a 2–0 away loss to Turkey in the 1960 European Nations' Cup qualifiers.

== Death ==
Anghel died on 12 September 2014, aged 76 in Bucharest after suffering a heart attack.

== Honours ==
Dinamo București

- Divizia A: 1961–62, 1962–63
- Cupa României: 1958–59

Petrolul Ploiești

- Cupa României: 1962–63
