= Iuliu Uțu =

Romanian footballer (1936–2019)

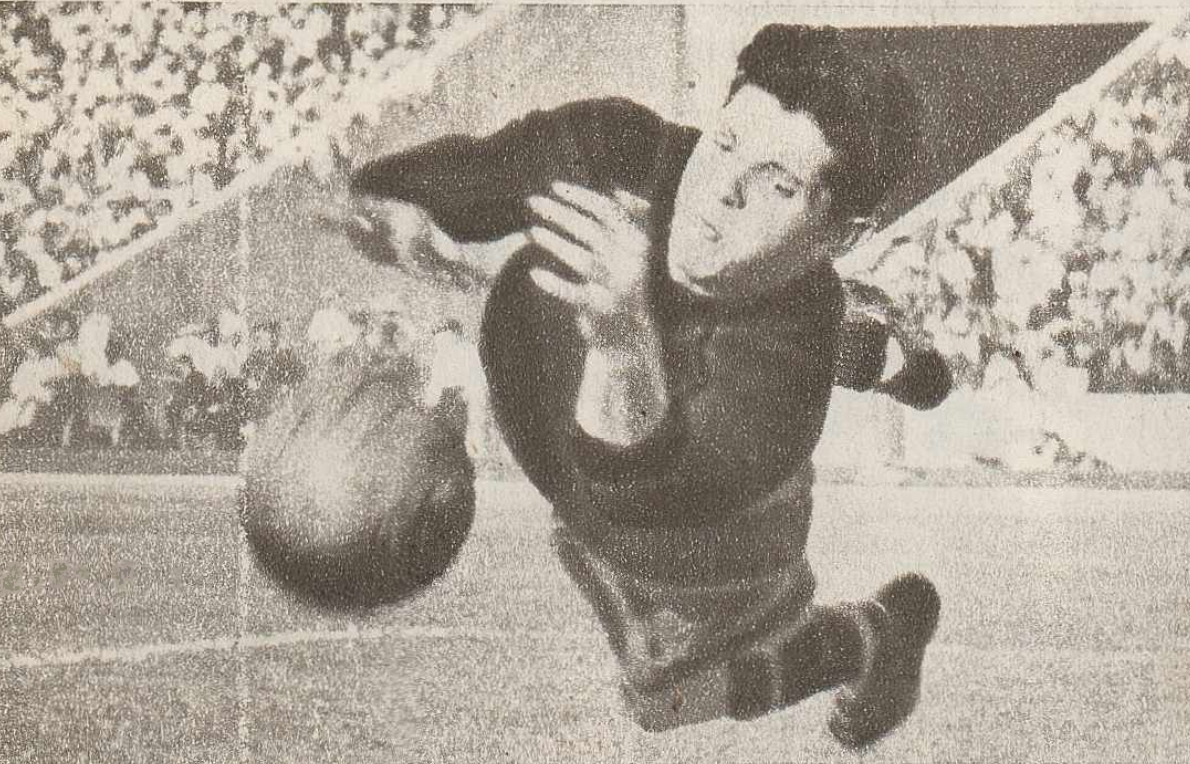
- Uțu in 1957

Personal information
- Date of birth: 14 September 1936
- Place of birth: Timișoara, Romania
- Date of death: 1 November 2019 (aged 83)
- Position: Goalkeeper

Senior career*
Years	Team	Apps	(Gls)
1955	Știința Timișoara	24	(0)
1956–1966	Dinamo București	124	(0)
1966–1969	Farul Constanța	52	(0)
1969–1972	R.W.D. Molenbeek	0	(0)
Total		200	(0)

International career
1957–1959	Romania B	3	(0)
1958–1964	Romania U23	4	(0)
- * Club domestic league appearances and goals

Iuliu Uțu (14 September 1936 – 1 November 2019) was a Romanian professional footballer who played as a goalkeeper.

== Club career ==
Uțu was born on 14 September 1936 in Timișoara, Romania. He began playing football at Știința Timișoara, making his Divizia A debut on 6 March 1955 under coach Vasile Deheleanu in a 2–1 away loss to CCA București. In his first season, he played for the entirety of all 24 rounds as the team earned a fourth place.

Uțu went to play for Dinamo București in 1956. There, he played two matches in the first European campaign for a Romanian team during the 1956–57 European Cup. Dinamo got past Galatasaray in the first round, being defeated in the next round by CDNA Sofia. His first trophy won was the 1958–59 Cupa României, keeping a clean sheet under coach Iuliu Baratky in the 4–0 win over CSM Baia Mare in the final. Uțu helped Dinamo win four consecutive Divizia A titles from 1962 until 1965. In the first one he worked with three coaches, Traian Ionescu, Constantin Teașcă and Nicolae Dumitru, who gave him eight appearances. In the next two he was coached by Dumitru and Ionescu who used him 17 games in the first one and two in the second. For the last title, Uțu played in six matches under the guidance of Angelo Niculescu. He also played in a 1–1 draw against Galatasaray in the first round of the 1962–63 European Cup. During these years, Uțu also won the 1963–64 Cupa României, as coach Ionescu sent him in the 85th minute to replace Ilie Datcu in the 5–3 victory against rivals Steaua București in the final.

In 1966, Uțu joined Farul Constanța. There, he made his last Divizia A appearance on 27 April 1969 in a 3–0 away loss to Jiul Petroșani, totaling 200 matches in the competition. Subsequently, Uțu went to Belgium where he played for R.W.D. Molenbeek until 1972.

== International career ==
From 1957 to 1964, Uțu made several appearances for Romania's B and under-23 teams.

== Death ==
Uțu died on 1 November 2019 at the age of 83.

== Honours ==
Dinamo București

- Divizia A: 1961–62, 1962–63, 1963–64, 1964–65
- Cupa României: 1958–59, 1963–64
