= Dumitru Ivan =

Romanian footballer (1938–2015)

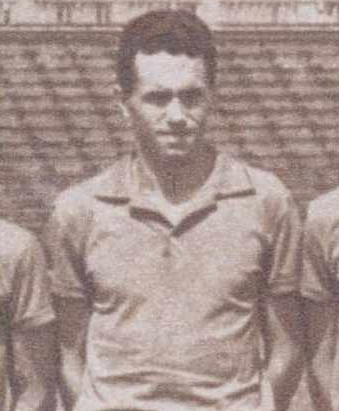
- Ivan in 1963

Personal information
- Date of birth: 14 May 1938
- Place of birth: Bucharest, Romania
- Date of death: 17 June 2015 (aged 77)
- Place of death: Bucharest, Romania
- Height: 1.77 m (5 ft 10 in)
- Position: Left-back

Youth career
- 1955–1957: Locomotiva București

Senior career*
Years	Team	Apps	(Gls)
1959–1960	Dinamo Obor București		
1960–1967	Dinamo București	121	(1)
1967–1970	Argeș Pitești	42	(1)
1970–1975	TUS Wansee		
Total		163	(2)

International career
1961–1964	Romania	12 (Note: Including 6 appearances for Romania's Olympic team)	(0)
- * Club domestic league appearances and goals

Dumitru Ivan (14 May 1938 – 17 June 2015) was a Romanian footballer who played as a left-back.

== Club career ==
Ivan was born on 14 May 1938 in București, Romania and began playing junior-level football in 1955 at Locomotiva București.

In 1959 he started his senior career at Divizia B team Dinamo Obor București, transferring after one season to Dinamo București. There, he made his Divizia A debut on 19 June 1960 under coach Traian Ionescu in a 3–1 away loss to Farul Constanța. Ivan won four consecutive Divizia A titles from 1962 until 1965. In the first one he worked with three coaches, Ionescu, Constantin Teașcă and Nicolae Dumitru, who gave him 26 appearances. In the following two Dumitru and Ionescu used him in 25 matches in the first, scoring one goal in a 2–2 draw against rivals Steaua București, and in 19 games in the second. He made 19 appearances in the last one under the guidance of Angelo Niculescu. Ivan also won the 1963–64 Cupa României with The Red Dogs, coach Ionescu using him the entire match in the 5–3 victory over Steaua in the final. He represented Dinamo in 10 European Cup matches. He played in all four games of the 1963–64 European Cup campaign as they got past East Germany champion, Motor Jena, being eliminated in the next phase by Real Madrid. In the 1965–66 edition, Ivan appeared in a historical 2–1 win over Inter Milan, who were the winners of the previous two seasons of the competition.

In 1967, Ivan was transferred to Argeș Pitești where on 7 December 1969 he made his last Divizia A appearance in a 2–2 draw against Universitatea Craiova, totaling 163 appearances with two goals in the competition. He also played six games in the Inter-Cities Fairs Cup for Argeș. In 1970, Ivan joined TUS Wansee in West Germany for five seasons, after which he retired from his playing career.

== International career ==
Ivan played six matches for Romania, making his debut on 8 October 1961 under coach Gheorghe Popescu in a 4–0 friendly victory against Turkey. His next game was a 3–1 win over Spain in the 1964 European Nations' Cup qualifiers. Ivan's following matches were friendlies, the last one being a 0–0 draw against Turkey played on 9 October 1963. He also played for Romania's Olympic team, being chosen by coach Silviu Ploeșteanu to be part of the 1964 Summer Olympics squad in Tokyo where he played in a 1–1 draw against Iran in the group stage, the team finishing the competition in fifth place.

== Death ==
Ivan died on 17 June 2015 at the age of 77 in his native București, after suffering from cirrhosis and diabetes.

== Honours ==
Dinamo București

- Divizia A: 1961–62, 1962–63, 1963–64, 1964–65
- Cupa României: 1963–64
