= Ion Suru =

Romanian footballer

Personal information
- Date of birth: 20 October 1927
- Place of birth: Turda, Romania
- Date of death: 25 May 1979 (aged 51)
- Position: Left winger

Senior career*
Years	Team	Apps	(Gls)
1947–1948	CFR Turda		
1948	Dermata Cluj		
1949	CFR Cluj	10	(0)
1949–1950	Locomotiva București	21	(1)
1951–1959	Dinamo București (Note: The 1957 championship called Cupa Primăverii is unofficial, so the appearances and goals scored at that competition for Dinamo București are not official.)	143	(36)
1959–1961	Industria Sârmei Câmpia Turzii		
Total		174	(37)

International career
1950–1955	Romania	12	(3)
- * Club domestic league appearances and goals

Ion Suru (20 October 1927 – 1979) was a Romanian footballer. He competed in the men's tournament at the 1952 Summer Olympics.

== Club career ==
Suru was born on 20 October 1927 in Turda, Romania and began playing football in 1947 at local club CFR in Divizia B, one year later moving to Dermata Cluj. Subsequently, he joined CFR Cluj where on 3 April 1949 he made his Divizia A debut under coach Elemer Hirsch in a 3–0 away loss to CSU Timișoara. Shortly afterwards he went to play for Locomotiva București. In 1951, Suru signed with Dinamo București where in his first season he scored a personal record of 10 goals, including one in a 6–2 win over rivals CCA București. He was used the entire match by coach Angelo Niculescu in the 1954 Cupa României final which was lost with 2–0 to Metalul Reșița. In the following season he helped the club win its first title, being used by Niculescu in 22 matches in which he scored seven goals. Suru played in the first European match for a Romanian team during the 1956–57 European Cup, a 3–1 victory against Galatasaray, scoring a goal in the 2–1 loss in the second leg. The Red Dogs advanced to the next phase of the competition where they were eliminated by CDNA Sofia, Suru playing in all four games of the campaign. On 9 October 1957, he scored a goal in a 3–2 league derby victory against CCA. He won the 1958–59 Cupa României, but coach Iuliu Baratky did not use him in the 4–0 win over CSM Baia Mare in the final. On 10 May 1959, Suru made his last Divizia A appearance in Dinamo's 1–0 loss to CCA, totaling 174 matches with 37 goals in the competition.

== International career ==
Suru played 12 games and scored three goals for Romania, making his debut on 8 October 1950 under coach Emerich Vogl in a 6–0 friendly victory against Albania in which he closed the score. He was selected by coach Gheorghe Popescu to play in the 1952 Summer Olympics, appearing in the 2–1 loss in the first round against eventual champions Hungary in which he scored once. His following two games were a 2–1 away win over Bulgaria and 1–0 home loss to Czechoslovakia in the 1954 World Cup qualifiers. All of his following games were friendlies, scoring a goal in a 3–2 loss to East Germany. Suru's last appearance for the national team occurred on 9 October 1955 in a 1–1 draw against Bulgaria.

=== International goals ===
Scores and results list Romania's goal tally first. "Score" column indicates the score after each Ion Suru goal.

#	Date	Venue	Opponent	Score	Result	Competition
1.	8 October 1950	Stadionul Republicii, Bucharest, Romania	Albania	6–0	6–0	Friendly
2.	15 July 1952	Kupittaan Jalkapallostadion, Turku, Finland	Hungary	1–2	1–2	1952 Summer Olympics
3.	18 September 1955	Stadionul 23 August, Bucharest, Romania	East Germany	2–1	2–3	Friendly

== Death ==
Suru died on 25 May 1979 at age 51.

== Honours ==
Dinamo București

- Divizia A: 1955
- Cupa României: 1958–59
