= Ladislau Băcuț =

Romanian footballer and manager

Personal information
- Date of birth: 12 November 1931
- Place of birth: Oradea, Kingdom of Romania
- Date of death: 1996 (aged 64–65)
- Place of death: Miercurea Ciuc, Romania
- Position: Defender

Youth career
- 1946–1948: ITA Arad

Senior career*
Years	Team	Apps	(Gls)
1949–1951	ITA Arad	38	(0)
1952–1956	Dinamo București	107	(1)
1957–1963	UTA Arad	94	(3)
Total		239	(4)

Managerial career
- Odorheiu Secuiesc
- Miercurea Ciuc
- * Club domestic league appearances and goals

Ladislau Băcuț (also known as Ladislau Băcuț II; 12 November 1931 – 1996) was a Romanian football defender and manager.

== Playing career ==
Băcuț was born on 12 November 1931 in Oradea, Kingdom of Romania. In 1946, he joined the junior football center of ITA Arad. Subsequently, he made his Divizia A debut under coach Francisc Dvorzsák on 19 March 1950 in a 4–1 away loss to Partizanul Petroșani. Until the end of the season, Băcuț appeared in all 22 league games, helping the club win the title. He also played the entire match under Dvorzsák in the Cupa României final which was lost 3–1 to CCA București.

In 1950, Băcuț joined Dinamo București. On 25 October 1953, he scored his first Divizia A goal in a 4–2 loss to Universitatea Cluj. His first achievement with Dinamo was reaching the 1954 Cupa României final, where coach Angelo Niculescu used him the full 90 minutes in the 2–0 loss to Metalul Reșița. In the following season, Băcuț helped the club win their first Divizia A title, being used by Niculescu in 24 matches. Subsequently, he played in the first European match for a Romanian team during the 1956–57 European Cup, a 3–1 victory against Galatasaray. The Red Dogs advanced to the next phase of the competition, where they were eliminated by CDNA Sofia, Băcuț playing three games in the campaign.

In 1957, Băcuț returned to ITA, which was renamed UTA Arad. In his first season, he scored three goals. He played for UTA until 1962, retiring afterwards. Băcuț accumulated a total of 239 matches with four goals in Divizia A.

== Managerial career ==
After he ended his playing career, Băcuț worked as a coach in the Romanian lower leagues for teams such as Odorheiu Secuiesc and Miercurea Ciuc.

== Personal life ==
His brother, Gheorghe, was also a footballer, and they played together at Dinamo București, winning the 1955 Divizia A title.

== Death ==
In 1996, Băcuț died in Miercurea Ciuc, Romania.

== Honours ==
UTA Arad

- Divizia A: 1950
- Cupa României runner-up: 1950

Dinamo București

- Divizia A: 1955
- Cupa României runner-up: 1954
