= Valeriu Călinoiu =

Romanian footballer

Personal information
- Date of birth: 9 October 1928
- Place of birth: Bucharest, Romania
- Date of death: 20 December 1990 (aged 62)
- Position: Midfielder

Youth career
- 1942–1943: Olympia București
- 1943–1944: Carmen București

Senior career*
Years	Team	Apps	(Gls)
1948	IMS Hunedoara		
1948–1949	Petrolul București	3	(0)
1950	Dinamo Brașov		
1951–1960	Dinamo București (Note: The 1957 championship called Cupa Primăverii is unofficial, so the appearances and goals scored at that competition for Dinamo București are not official.)	164	(9)
Total		167	(9)

International career
1952–1959	Romania (Note: Including one appearance for Romania's Olympic team.)	21	(1)

Managerial career
- 1961–1963: Știința Craiova
- * Club domestic league appearances and goals

Valeriu Călinoiu (9 October 1928 – 20 December 1990) was a Romanian footballer. He competed in the men's tournament at the 1952 Summer Olympics.

== Club career ==
Călinoiu was born on 9 October 1928 in Bucharest, Romania and began playing junior-level football in 1942 at Olympia București, moving after one year to Carmen București. He started his senior career in 1948 at IMS Hunedoara. He made his Divizia A debut, playing for Petrolul București on 29 May 1949 under coach Colea Vâlcov in a 2–0 away victory against CFR Cluj. After a short period spent in Divizia B at Dinamo Brașov, a team he helped promote to the first league, he went to play for Dinamo București in 1951. There, his first performance with the club was reaching the 1954 Cupa României final where coach Angelo Niculescu used him the entire match in the eventual 2–0 loss to Metalul Reșița. In the following season, Călinoiu helped the club win its first Divizia A title, scoring one goal in the 22 matches he was used by Niculescu. He played in the first European match of a Romanian team in the 1956–57 European Cup in the 3–1 victory against Galatasaray in which he was also the team's captain. The Red Dogs advanced to the next phase of the competition where they were eliminated by CDNA Sofia, Călinoiu playing in all four games of the campaign. He reached another Cupa României final in 1959, this time winning it, as coach Iuliu Baratky played him for the entire match in the 4–0 win over CSM Baia Mare. On 19 June 1960, Călinoiu played his last Divizia A match for Dinamo in a 3–1 away loss against Farul Constanța, totaling 167 matches with nine goals in the competition.

== International career ==
Călinoiu played 20 games and scored one goal for Romania, making his debut under coach Gheorghe Popescu in the 1952 Summer Olympics in a 2–1 loss against eventual champions, Hungary. He played four games in which he scored one goal in a 2–1 away victory against Bulgaria during the 1954 World Cup qualifiers. His last four games played for the national team were in the 1958 World Cup qualifiers, the last one taking place on 17 November 1957 in a 2–0 away loss to Yugoslavia.

=== International goals ===
Scores and results list Romania's goal tally first, score column indicates score after each Călinoiu goal.

List of international goals scored by Valeriu Călinoiu
#	Date	Venue	Cap	Opponent	Score	Result	Competition
1	11 October 1953	Vasil Levski National Stadium, Sofia, Bulgaria	5	Bulgaria	2–1	2–1	1954 World Cup qualifiers

== Managerial career ==
Călinoiu's only coaching spell was from 1961 to 1963 at Divizia B team Știința Craiova, where he debuted Ion Oblemenco in senior football.

== Death ==
Călinoiu died on 20 December 1990 at age 62.

== Honours ==
Dinamo Brașov

- Divizia B: 1950

Dinamo București

- Divizia A: 1955
- Cupa României: 1958–59, runner-up 1954
