= 1958–59 Cupa României =

Tournament details
- Country: Romania

Final positions
- Champions: Dinamo București
- Runners-up: CSM Baia Mare

The 1958–59 Cupa României was the 21st edition of Romania's most prestigious football cup competition.

The title was won by Dinamo București against CSM Baia Mare.

== Format ==
The competition is an annual knockout tournament.

In the first round proper, two pots were made, first pot with Divizia A teams and other teams till 16 and the second pot with the rest of teams qualified in this phase. Each tie is played as a single leg.

It is the second season in the history of Cupa României when all the games are played on a neutral location.

If a match is drawn after 90 minutes, the game goes in extra time, and if the scored is still tight after 120 minutes, then a replay will be played. In case the game is still tight after the replay, then the team from lower division will qualify for the next round.

From the first edition, the teams from Divizia A entered in competition in sixteen finals, rule which remained till today.

== First round proper ==
Team 1	Score	Team 2
8 March 1959
UTA Arad (Div. A)	3–2	(Div. B) AMEF Arad
CCA București (Div. A)	8–1	(Div. B) Unirea Focşani
Petrolul Ploiești (Div. A)	3–0	(Div. C) Carpaţi Sinaia
Progresul București (Div. A)	1–0	(Div. C) Textila Sfântu Gheorghe
Ştiinţa Cluj (Div. A)	4–2	(Div. C) CFR Cluj
Farul Constanța (Div. A)	2–0	(Div. D) Marina Constanţa
Textila Botoşani (Div. C)	2–1 (a.e.t.)	(Div. C) Locomotiva Paşcani
Ştiinţa Galaţi (Div. C)	2–1	(Div. D) Locomotiva Filaret București
Dinamo Bacău (Div. A)	3–2	(Div. C) Petrolul Moineşti
Dinamo București (Div. A)	4–0	(Div. C) Rafinăria Câmpina
Metalul Târgovişte (Div. C)	1–2	(Div. A) Rapid București
Steagul Roşu Oraşul Stalin (Div. A)	2–1	(Div. C) Arieșul Turda
Aurul Brad (Div. C)	2–2 (a.e.t.)	(Div. A) Jiul Petroșani
CFR Timișoara (Div. B)	2–0	(Div. A) Ştiinţa Timişoara
Minerul Aninoasa (Div. D)	1–0	(Div. D) CFR Rovine Craiova
15 March 1959
CSM Baia Mare (Div. B)	3–1	(Div. C) Voinţa Oradea
18 March 1959 — Replay
Aurul Brad (Div. C)	0–0 (a.e.t.)	(Div. A) Jiul Petroșani

== Second round proper ==
Team 1	Score	Team 2
1 April 1959
Petrolul Ploiești	3–0	Ştiinţa Galaţi
CCA București	3–1	Steagul Roşu Oraşul Stalin
Progresul București	2–0	CFR Timișoara
Aurul Brad	2–1	Minerul Aninoasa
CSM Baia Mare	2–0	Ştiinţa Cluj
Rapid București	3–2	Farul Constanța
Dinamo București	1–0	UTA Arad
Dinamo Bacău	4–1	Textila Botoşani

== Quarter-finals ==
Team 1	Score	Team 2
20 May 1959
Rapid București	3–0	Aurul Brad
CSM Baia Mare	1–0	Petrolul Ploiești
Dinamo București	3–1	CCA București
Progresul București	2–1	Dinamo Bacău

== Semi-finals ==
Team 1	Score	Team 2
3 June 1959
CSM Baia Mare	2–1	Progresul București
Dinamo București	5–3	Rapid București

== Final ==
14 June 1959
17:30 EET

Dinamo București	4–0	CSM Baia Mare
Szakács 30', 80', 90' (pen.); Anghel 57'	Report

23 August, Bucharest
Attendance: 40,000
Referee: Mihail Popa (Bucharest)

Cupa României 1958–59 winners

1st title
