= Gheorghe Băcuț =

Romanian footballer

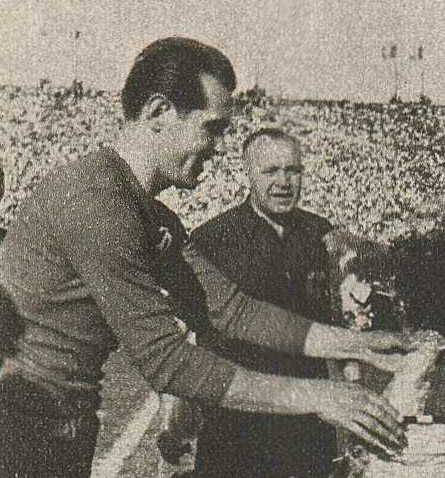

Personal information
- Date of birth: 12 July 1927
- Place of birth: Oradea, Kingdom of Romania
- Date of death: 24 July 1974 (aged 47)
- Place of death: Oradea, Romania
- Height: 1.78 m (5 ft 10 in)
- Position: Right back

Youth career
- 1941–1945: Stăruința Oradea

Senior career*
Years	Team	Apps	(Gls)
1945–1946	Libertatea Oradea		
1946–1949	ITA Arad	75	(5)
1950–1956	Dinamo București	144	(1)
1957–1961	CS Oradea	62	(4)
Total		281	(10)

International career^{‡}
1945–1956	Romania	28	(1)
- * Club domestic league appearances and goals as of 6 November 2019 ‡ National team caps and goals as of 6 November 2019

Gheorghe Băcuț (also known as Gheorghe Băcuț I; 12 July 1927 – 24 July 1974) was a Romanian footballer who played as a right back.

== Club career ==
Băcuț was born on 12 July 1927 in Oradea, Kingdom of Romania and began playing junior-level football at local clubs, Stăruința and Libertatea. In 1946, he started his senior career at ITA Arad, making his Divizia A debut under coach Zoltán Opata on 25 August in a 5–1 away win against his former club, Libertatea. Until the end of the season, he played a total of 24 games with one goal scored, helping the club win its first title. In the following season, he helped The Old Lady win The Double, being used by coach Petre Steinbach in 26 matches in which he scored four goals, and also played the entire match in the 3–2 victory in the 1948 Cupa României final against CFR Timișoara.

In 1950, Băcuț joined Dinamo București, and his first achievement was reaching the 1954 Cupa României final, where coach Angelo Niculescu used him the full 90 minutes in the 2–0 loss to Metalul Reșița. In the following season, he helped the club win their first Divizia A title, being used by Niculescu in 24 matches. Subsequently, he played in the first European match for a Romanian team during the 1956–57 European Cup, a 3–1 victory against Galatasaray. The Red Dogs advanced to the next phase of the competition where they were eliminated by CDNA Sofia against whom he scored a goal, Băcuț playing three games in the campaign.

In 1957, Băcuț returned to his hometown to play for CS Oradea, where on 15 June 1958 he made his last Divizia A appearance in a 3–0 away loss against his former team, Dinamo, totaling 237 matches with eight goals in the competition. In 1958, he and other players were banned from playing football by the Communist regime because "their lack of responsibility resulted in liberalist tendencies", but after one year he was allowed to play again. He retired in 1961 after playing two seasons in Divizia B for CS Oradea.

== International career ==
Băcuț played 28 matches for Romania, making his debut under coach Coloman Braun-Bogdan on 30 September 1945 in a 7–2 friendly loss to Hungary. He played in a 2–1 victory in the 1946 Balkan Cup against Yugoslavia and made three appearances in the 1947 edition, scoring one goal in a 3–2 win over Bulgaria. Subsequently, he played another four games in the 1948 Balkan Cup. Băcuț also played three matches in the 1954 World Cup qualifiers, making his last appearance for the national team on 10 September 1956 in a 2–0 away loss to Bulgaria in which he was for the first time the team's captain.

=== International goals ===
Scores and results list Romania's goal tally first. "Score" column indicates the score after each Gheorghe Băcuț goal.

#	Date	Venue	Opponent	Score	Result	Competition
1.	6 July 1947	Yunak Stadium, Sofia, Bulgaria	Bulgaria	1–0	3–2	1947 Balkan Cup

== Personal life ==
His brother, Ladislau, was also a footballer, and they played together at Dinamo București, winning the 1955 Divizia A title.

== Death ==
Băcuț died on 24 July 1974 at age 47 in his native town, Oradea.

== Honours ==
ITA Arad

- Divizia A: 1946–47, 1947–48
- Cupa României: 1947–48

Dinamo București

- Divizia A: 1955
- Cupa României runner-up: 1954
