= Carol Bartha =

Romanian footballer

Personal information
- Date of birth: 19 September 1923
- Place of birth: Oradea, Kingdom of Romania
- Date of death: 7 December 1976 (aged 53)
- Place of death: Oradea, Romania
- Position: Forward

Senior career*
Years	Team	Apps	(Gls)
1946–1948	Ciocanul București	48	(21)
1948–1955	Dinamo București	119	(35)
1955–1958	Progresul Oradea (Note: The 1957 championship called Cupa Primăverii is unofficial, so the appearances and goals scored at that competition for Progresul Oradea are not official.)	1	(0)
1960–1961	Voința Oradea		
Total		168	(60)

International career^{‡}
1948–1949	Romania	7	(1)

Managerial career
- 1957–1958: Progresul Oradea
- * Club domestic league appearances and goals as of 6 November 2019 ‡ National team caps and goals as of 6 November 2019

Carol Bartha (Hungarian: Bartha Károly; 19 September 1923 – 7 December 1976) was a Romanian footballer who played as a forward.

== Club career ==
Bartha was born on 19 September 1923 in Oradea, Kingdom of Romania. He started playing football at Ciocanul București, making his Divizia A debut on 8 September 1946 under coach Béla Guttmann in a 2–0 home win over CFR București. In 1948, Bartha joined the newly founded club Dinamo București where on 21 November 1948, coach Coloman Braun-Bogdan played him for the entire duration of the first ever CSCA – Dinamo derby that ended with a 1–0 victory. His first performance with the club was reaching the 1954 Cupa României final where coach Angelo Niculescu used him the entire match in the eventual 2–0 loss to Metalul Reșița. Then in the following season he helped the club win its first title, being used by Niculescu in 11 matches in which he scored four goals. In 1957, Bartha returned to his hometown to play for Progresul Oradea where on 3 October 1957 he made his last Divizia A appearance in a 3–2 home loss to Energia Recolta Târgu Mureș, totaling 168 matches with 60 goals in the competition. He ended his career in 1961 after playing in the Romanian lower leagues for Voința Oradea.

== International career ==
Bartha played seven matches for Romania, making his debut on 6 June 1948 when coach Petre Steinbach sent him at half-time to replace Andrei Mercea in a 9–0 loss to Hungary in the 1948 Balkan Cup. His following four matches were at the same competition, scoring the victory goal from a penalty in a 2–1 win over Czechoslovakia. He made his last appearance for the national team on 23 October 1949 in a friendly that ended in a 1–1 draw against Albania.

=== International goals ===
Scores and results list Romania's goal tally first, score column indicates score after each Carol Bartha goal.

Goal	Date	Venue	Opponent	Score	Result	Competition
1	4 July 1948	Stadionul Giulești, București, Romania	Czechoslovakia	2–1	2–1	Friendly

== Death ==
Bartha died on 7 December 1976 at age 53 in his native town, Oradea.

== Honours ==
Dinamo București

- Divizia A: 1955
- Cupa României runner-up: 1954
