= Constantin Dinulescu =

Romanian footballer

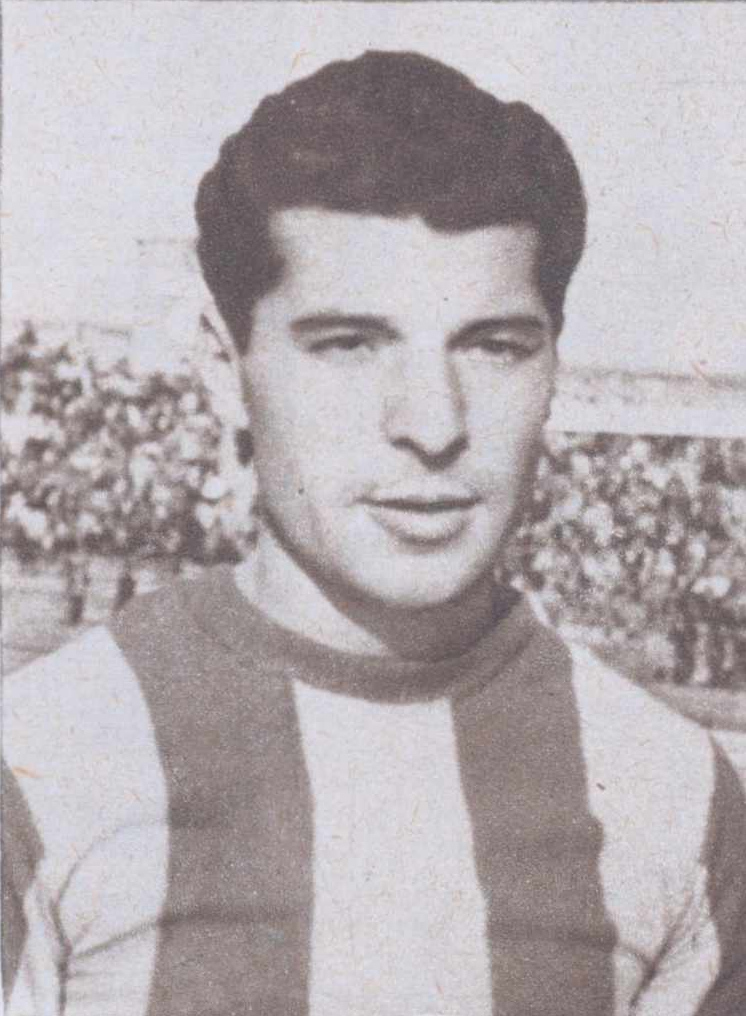

Personal information
- Date of birth: 19 April 1931
- Place of birth: București, Romania
- Date of death: 1 February 2017 (aged 85)
- Height: 1.76 m (5 ft 9 in)
- Position: Forward

Youth career
- 1945–1948: Unirea Tricolor București

Senior career*
Years	Team	Apps	(Gls)
1948–1949	UCB București		
1950	Progresul ICAS București		
1952–1953	Știința Iași		
1954–1956	Știința Timișoara	65	(32)
1957–1962	Progresul București (Note: The statistics for the 1957 unofficial championship called Cupa Primăverii are not taken into consideration.)	79	(33)
1962–1964	Farul Constanța	40	(15)
Total		184	(80)

International career
1956–1957	Romania B	2	(0)
1959	Romania Olympic	1	(0)
1958–1960	Romania	3	(2)
- * Club domestic league appearances and goals

Constantin Dinulescu (19 April 1931 – 1 February 2017) was a Romanian football forward who played for Romania in the 1960 European Nations' Cup.

== Club career ==
Dinulescu was born on 19 April 1931 in București, Romania and began playing junior-level football in 1945 at Unirea Tricolor București. He started playing senior-level football in the regional championship for UCB București. In 1950, he joined Divizia B club Progresul ICAS București. Subsequently, in 1952 he went to play for Știința Iași in the same division. Two years later, he joined Știința Timișoara, making his Divizia A debut on 21 March 1954 under coach Eugen Mladin in a 0–0 away draw against Metalul Hunedoara. Dinulescu scored a career-best 17 goals in the 1955 season, which made him the second top-scorer of the league, with one goal fewer than teammate Ion Ciosescu. On 1 July 1956, he scored a goal in a 2–1 West derby victory against UTA Arad. In 1957, Dinulescu switched teams again, transferring from Politehnica to Progresul București. His first achievement with the club was reaching the 1958 Cupa României final, playing the entire match under coaches Ioan Lupaș and Cornel Drăgușin in the 1–0 loss to Știința Timișoara. Dinulescu won the 1959–60 Cupa României with Progresul, but coach Augustin Botescu did not use him in the final. In 1962, he went to Farul Constanța where he was part of the team's prolific offensive trio alongside Ciosescu and Iosif Bükössy. There, he made his last Divizia A appearance on 8 December 1963 in a 1–0 away loss to Petrolul Ploiești, totaling 184 matches with 80 goals in the competition.

== International career ==
Between 1956 and 1959, Dinulescu made several appearances for Romania's B and Olympic teams.

Dinulescu played three games and scored two goals for Romania. He made his debut on 30 September 1962, opening the score under coach Augustin Botescu in a 2–1 friendly loss to rivals Hungary in which he was also sent off in the 67th minute. Subsequently, he scored a goal in a 3–0 win over Turkey in the Euro 1960 qualifiers which helped his side reach the quarter-finals where they were defeated by Czechoslovakia who advanced to the final tournament.

=== International goals ===
Scores and results list Romania's goal tally first, score column indicates score after each Dinulescu goal.

List of international goals scored by Constantin Dinulescu
No.	Date	Venue	Opponent	Score	Result	Competition
1	26 October 1958	Stadionul 23 August, Bucharest, Romania	Hungary	1–0	1–2	Friendly match
2	2 November 1958	Stadionul 23 August, Bucharest, Romania	Turkey	3–0	3–0	1960 European Nations' Cup qualifying

== Refereeing career ==
After he ended his playing career, Dinulescu became a referee who officiated 113 Divizia A matches over the course of 12 seasons. He also officiated at international and European club level.

== Personal life and death ==
In 2008, Dinulescu received the Honorary Citizen of Timișoara title.

Dinulescu died on 1 February 2017 at age 85.

== Honours ==
Progresul București

- Cupa României: 1959–60, runner-up 1957–58
