= 1960 Cupa României final =

- Event: 1959–60 Cupa României
Progresul București	Dinamo Obor
2	0
- Date: 3 July 1960
- Venue: Republicii, Bucharest
- Referee: Andrei Rădulescu (Bucharest)
- Attendance: 25,000

The 1960 Cupa României final was the 22nd final of Romania's most prestigious football cup competition. It was disputed between Progresul București and Dinamo Obor București, and was won by Progresul București after a game with two goals. It was the first cup for Progresul București.

Dinamo Obor București was the sixth club representing Divizia B which reached the Romanian Cup final.

== Match details ==
3 July 1960
17:30 EET

Progresul București	2–0	Dinamo Obor București
Oaidă 10'; Soare 34'	Report

Republicii, Bucharest
Attendance: 25,000
Referee: Andrei Rădulescu (Bucharest)

GK	1	(Romania) Petre Mândru
DF	2	(Romania) Nicolae Smărăndescu
DF	3	(Romania) Alexandru Karikas
DF	4	(Romania) Valeriu Soare
MF	5	(Romania) Ovidiu Maior
MF	6	(Romania) Nicolae Ioniță
FW	7	(Romania) Nicolae Oaidă
FW	8	(Romania) Mihai Smărăndescu
FW	9	(Romania) Șerban Protopopescu
FW	10	(Romania) Victor Mafteuță
FW	11	(Romania) George Marin
Manager:
(Romania) Augustin Botescu

GK	1	(Romania) Ilie Datcu
DF	2	(Romania) Buzeșan
DF	3	(Romania) Kurt Gross
DF	4	(Romania) Olteanu
MF	5	(Romania) Stoica
MF	6	(Romania) Constantin Ștefan
FW	7	(Romania) Buzatu
FW	8	(Romania) I.Niculescu
FW	9	(Romania) Filip Staudt
FW	10	(Romania) Alexandru Vâlcov
FW	11	(Romania) Tiberiu Selymesi
Manager:
(Romania) Constantin Teașcă

== See also ==
- List of Cupa României finals
