= 1958 Cupa României final =

- Event: 1957–58 Cupa României
Știința Timișoara	Progresul București
1	0
- Date: 6 July 1958
- Venue: 23 August, Bucharest
- Referee: Solomon Segal (Bucharest)
- Attendance: 40,000

The 1958 Cupa României final was the 20th final of Romania's most prestigious football cup competition. It was disputed between Știința Timișoara and Progresul București, and was won by Știința Timișoara after a game with one goal. It was the first cup for Știința Timișoara.

== Match details ==
6 July 1958
17:30 EET

Știința Timișoara	1–0	Progresul București
Cădariu 37'	Report

23 August, Bucharest
Attendance: 40,000
Referee: Solomon Segal (Bucharest)

GK	1	(Romania) Mircea Enăchescu
DF	2	(Romania) Ion Zbârcea
DF	3	(Romania) Gheorghe Codreanu
DF	4	(Romania) Lucrețiu Florescu
MF	5	(Romania) Petre Cojereanu
MF	6	(Romania) Cornel Tănase
FW	7	(Romania) Iosif Lereter
FW	8	(Romania) Petre Cădariu
FW	9	(Romania) Ion Ciosescu
FW	10	(Romania) Raul Mazăre
FW	11	(Romania) Iuliu Boroș
Manager:
(Romania) Dincă Schileru

GK	1	(Romania) Petre Mândru
DF	2	(Romania) Lazăr Dobrescu
DF	3	(Romania) Alexandru Karikaș
DF	4	(Romania) Dragoș Cojocaru
MF	5	(Romania) Alexandru Ciocea
MF	6	(Romania) Florin Știrbei
FW	7	(Romania) Nicolae Oaidă
FW	8	(Romania) Mihai Smărăndescu
FW	9	(Romania) Titus Ozon
FW	10	(Romania) Constantin Dinulescu
FW	11	(Romania) Petre Moldoveanu
Manager:
(Romania) Ioan Lupaș & Cornel Drăgușin

== See also ==
- List of Cupa României finals
