= Constantin Teașcă =

Romanian football manager (1922–1996)

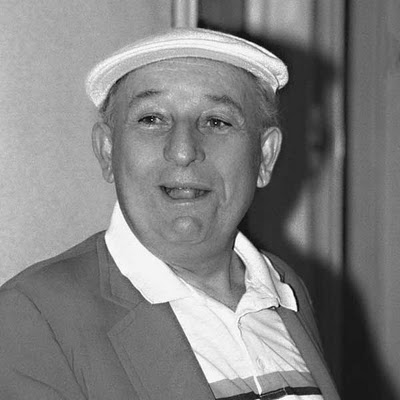
- Teașcă in the 1980s

Personal information
- Date of birth: 25 September 1922
- Place of birth: Giurgiu, Romania
- Date of death: 30 July 1996 (aged 73)
- Place of death: Bucharest, Romania
- Height: 1.62 m (5 ft 4 in)
- Position: Midfielder

Youth career
- 1932–1940: Acvila Giurgiu

Senior career*
Years	Team	Apps	(Gls)
1940–1946	Acvila Giurgiu		
1946–1950	Concordia Ploiești		

Managerial career
- 1955–1956: Romania U18
- 1956–1957: Dinamo București (youth)
- 1958–1960: Dinamo Bacău
- 1960–1961: Dinamo Obor București
- 1961–1962: Dinamo București
- 1962: Romania
- 1963–1965: CSMS Iași
- 1965–1966: Dinamo Bacău
- 1967: Universitatea Cluj
- 1967: Romania
- 1968: Universitatea Cluj
- 1969–1970: Argeș Pitești
- 1970–1971: Fenerbahçe
- 1971–1973: FC Galați
- 1974–1975: Steaua București
- 1975–1976: Șoimii Sibiu
- 1976–1977: Universitatea Craiova
- 1977–1979: Steagul Roșu Brașov
- 1979–1981: FCM Galați
- 1982–1984: Victoria București
- 1985: Bihor Oradea
- 1986: Universitatea Craiova
- 1986–1987: Montana Sinaia
- * Club domestic league appearances and goals

Constantin Teașcă also known as Titi Teașcă (25 September 1922 – 30 July 1996) was a Romanian football player and manager.

Nicknamed "Little Napoleon", Teașcă was known for his controversial training methods which led to conflicts with the players. He was the manager of Romania on two occasions, first in 1962 and then in 1967. He had one experience outside Romania when he managed Turkish side Fenerbahçe from 1970 to 1971. Teașcă has a total of 323 matches as a manager in the Romanian top-division, Divizia A, consisting of 120 victories, 64 draws and 139 losses.

== Playing career ==
Teașcă was born on 25 September 1922 in Giurgiu, Romania and began playing junior-level football in 1932 at local club Acvila. In 1940 he started to play for Acvila's senior team, being a midfielder, then in 1946 he joined Concordia Ploiești. In 1950 he decided to end his playing career at age 28, the highest level he played being the Romanian second league.

== Managerial career ==
Teașcă started coaching in 1955 at Romania's under-18 national team, managing to win its group in both of the 1955 and 1956 European Championships. Afterwards he continued to work with juniors for a while at Dinamo București.

He started coaching seniors in 1958 at Dinamo Bacău, managing to finish his first season with the club in fifth place, earning a victory against eventual champions Petrolul Ploiești and two victories over Steaua București. In 1960, Teașcă took charge of Divizia B team Dinamo Obor București, reaching the Cupa României final of that year which was lost with 2–0 to Progresul București. In the middle of the 1961–62 season he replaced Traian Ionescu at Dinamo București, but got replaced by Nicolae Dumitru after only four rounds, the team managing to win the championship at the end of the season.

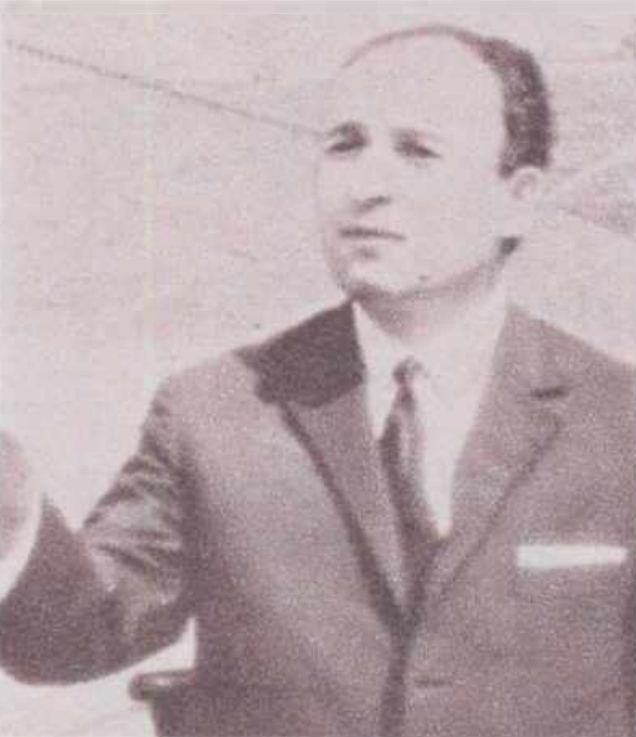
Teașcă in 1966

In 1962, Teașcă had his first spell at Romania's national team, his first game being a 4–0 home victory in a friendly against Morocco, a match in which he debuted eight young players: Gheorghe Dungu, Vasile Sfetcu, Emil Petru, Constantin Koszka, Zoltán Ivansuc, Marin Voinea, Vasile Gergely and Iosif Lazăr. His following two games were a 3–2 friendly loss to East Germany and a 6–0 defeat to Spain in the 1964 European Nations' Cup qualifiers. His next coaching experience started in 1963 at CSMS Iași where he spent two years. Subsequently, Teașcă returned for one season in the second league at Dinamo Bacău, where he advised player Constantin Rădulescu to become head coach of the team before his departure. Rădulescu managed to get them promoted to the first league. In 1967, Teașcă went to coach Universitatea Cluj for only one month, as he left for a second spell at Romania's national team, but eventually stayed only for one game: a goalless friendly draw against Poland.

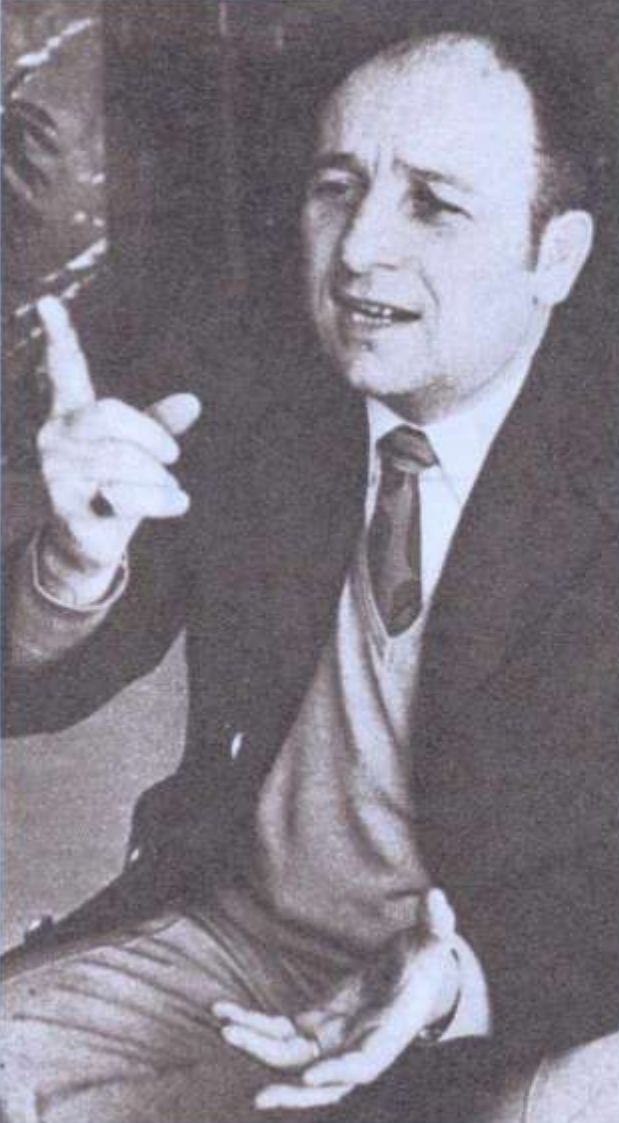
Teașcă in 1972

In 1968, Teașcă returned to "U" Cluj, moving afterwards to Argeș Pitești. Subsequently, in the 1970–71 season he had his only experience outside Romania at Turkish side Fenerbahçe, where two of his players were fellow Romanians Ilie Datcu and Mircea Sasu, finishing the season in second place. In the following years, Teașcă worked for FC Galați, Steaua București, Șoimii Sibiu and Universitatea Craiova. While working for Universitatea, he debuted many young players such as Nicolae Tilihoi, Aurel Țicleanu, Mircea Irimescu, Ion Geolgău and Sorin Cârțu. "U" Craiova also managed to win the 1976–77 Cupa României, but he left the team before the final as he had conflicts with many players. In the last years of his career, Teașcă worked for several clubs, including in the Romanian lower leagues such as Steagul Roșu Brașov, FCM Galați, Victoria București, Bihor Oradea, Universitatea Craiova and Montana Sinaia, totaling 323 matches as a manager in the Romanian top-division, Divizia A, consisting of 120 victories, 64 draws and 139 losses.

=== Managing style ===
Teașcă was known for implementing ideas derived from professional football, such as demanding quality training grounds to protect the playing surface for official games. He also sought to control his players' diets by excluding harmful foods and drinks, and he monitored their activities outside of training. However, he was also known for his controversial training methods like making players run while carrying 80-kilogram bags on their backs for which he would get in conflicts with them.

"U" Craiova player, Ilie Balaci said about him:"In theory, Teașcă wasn't a bad coach. But he had an incredible style of confounding people. Plus he was using some Stalinist training methods. He made us run for hours with 70–80 kilo bags on our backs. Well, the sack was heavier than Geolgău! How can you make fun of some kids like this?! Teașcă was big only because of the journalists". Another Craiova player, Nicolae Tilihoi said:"For Teașcă, the players were a kind of slaves. When we won, he said it was his merit. When we lost, it was our fault, that we sold him! He had a great deal with prime secretaries, with influential journalists, that's why he had such a good image". Argeș Pitești star, Nicolae Dobrin's conclusion about Teașcă was:"Poor Titi, everywhere he went he made stadiums, fields, only teams he couldn't make".

== Published works ==
Teașcă was also an avid reader and a writer, with witty remarks that made him a celebrity, having written a total of five volumes:

- Fotbal și fotbaliști la diferite meridiane (Football and footballers at different meridians) (1962)
- Fotbal la poalele Cordilierilor (Football at the foot of the Cordilleras) (1966)
- Din nou pe meridianele fotbalului (Again on the meridians of football) (1967)
- Ce rău v-am făcut? (What harm have I done to you?) (1976)
- Păpușarii (The puppeteers) (1984)
- Competiții de neuitat (Unforgettable competitions) (1989)

== Quotes ==
Teașcă was known for criticizing his players' lack of professionalism, especially in his books:

- "Eftimie asks me for permission to stay late in the city with his wife (at a restaurant) until 11 o'clock. I admit them even until 12 o'clock. At 3 in the morning, without his wife but with... a mistress, he was at the "Melody" bar. How can you trust him?"
- "Varga is absent from training for no reason. I checked, it turns out that around 5 p.m. he was under the table in the "Universității" restaurant and then "towed"... via Pantelimon."
- "Varga calls the ambulance at his home, everyone gets impatient, except me, because checking the medically equipped vehicle's route I find that he was transported to... alcohol detoxification!"
- "Pârcălab, swollen from a hard and very... wet night, with his collar up and his head hidden in his coat, like a turtle in its shell, comes to the edge of the field, where I was leading the training session, and tells me that he doesn't feel fit for work. I couldn't resist anymore...and in a minute I told him everything he had done and who he really is. He disappeared like in Iosefini's illusions and after five minutes he was working side by side with his teammates."
- "Pârcălab went to the Federation and complained (or better said he whispered in their ear) that he is a good, decent boy, but that Unguroiu and Vasile Alexandru are taking him to drink. Probably one was opening his mouth and the other was pouring!"
- "Ivan, Uțu, Eftimie, after the team's return from a match in Galați, stopped at a restaurant and didn't leave until the next day, when the place had to be cleaned up."
- "Beldeanu? He smokes like a Turk, he drinks like a circus bear drinks milk and gambles for money like a loser in life! He is the daily customer of the restaurants and incites the players to riot"
- "Sometimes, you were surprised that among those who fixed matches could be Ștefănescu, Balaci, Marcu, Crișan, Cămătaru, because Beldeanu was no longer discussed, he was known for a long time as a genuine Trojan Horse!"
- "When it comes to football, assistant sanitary agents become university professors, plasterers - famous painters, and the spectator in the stands - the most authorized coach. I wasn't upset that I was changed twice from the national team, because I was lost in such a large number of super specialists"

== Death ==
Teașcă died on 30 July 1996 in Bucharest at the age of 73.

== Honours ==
=== Manager ===
Dinamo Obor București

- Cupa României runner-up: 1959–60

Dinamo București

- Divizia A: 1961–62

Fenerbahçe

- Süper Lig runner-up: 1970–71

Universitatea Craiova

- Cupa României: 1976–77
