= Nicolae Oaidă =

Romanian footballer (1933–2025)

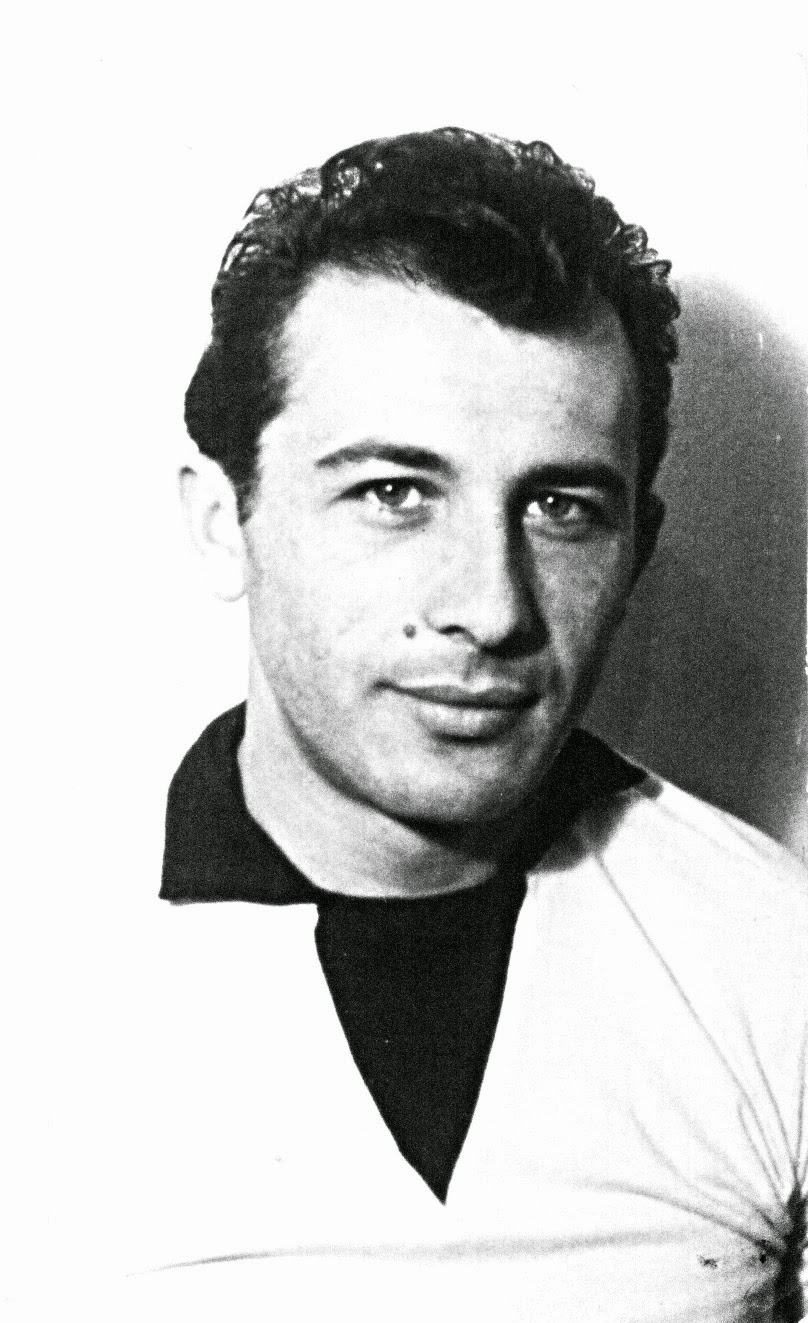
- Oaidă în the 1960s

Personal information
- Date of birth: 9 April 1933
- Place of birth: Bod, Brașov, Romania
- Date of death: 18 January 2025 (aged 91)
- Height: 1.82 m (6 ft 0 in)
- Position: Striker

Youth career
- 1946–1950: Steagul Roșu Brașov
- 1950–1953: Locomotiva Brașov

Senior career*
Years	Team	Apps	(Gls)
1954	Dinamo Brașov	4	(0)
1955–1956	Dinamo Bacău	42	(12)
1957–1969	Progresul București (Note: The 1957 championship called Cupa Primăverii is unofficial, so the appearances and goals scored at that competition for Progresul București are not official.)	226	(77)
Total		272	(89)

International career
1958–1961	Romania (Note: Including one appearance for Romania's Olympic team)	7	(1)

Managerial career
- 1969–1970: Flacăra Roșie București
- 1971–1972: Libya
- 1972–1974: Al-Ahly Benghazi
- 1974: Mureșul Deva
- 1975–1976: Viitorul Vaslui
- 1976–1978: Progresul București
- 1978–1979: Tractorul Brașov
- 1979: Jiul Petroșani
- 1981–1982: Autobuzul București
- 1983–1984: Metalul București
- 1989–1990: Hassania Agadir
- 1991–1992: Homenetmen Beirut
- * Club domestic league appearances and goals

Nicolae Oaidă (9 April 1933 – 18 January 2025) was a Romanian footballer and manager.

== Club career ==
Oaidă was born on 9 April 1933 in Bod, Brașov, Romania and began playing junior-level football in 1946 at local club Steagul Roșu. In 1950 he moved to neighboring club Locomotiva. He made his Divizia A debut on 16 May 1954, playing for Dinamo Brașov under coach Ștefan Dobay in a 3–0 loss to Locomotiva Timișoara. After one season at Dinamo Brașov, Oaidă went to play for two seasons at Dinamo Bacău, managing to help the team earn a promotion to the first league in his first season spent there.

In 1957 he joined Progresul București, where his first achievement was reaching of the 1958 Cupa României final, being used the entire match by coaches Ioan Lupaș and Cornel Drăgușin in the 1–0 loss to Știința Timișoara. In the following season he scored a personal record of 14 goals. Under coach Augustin Botescu, Oaidă opened the scoring in the 2–0 victory against Dinamo Obor București in the 1960 Cupa României final, which helped Progresul win its first trophy.

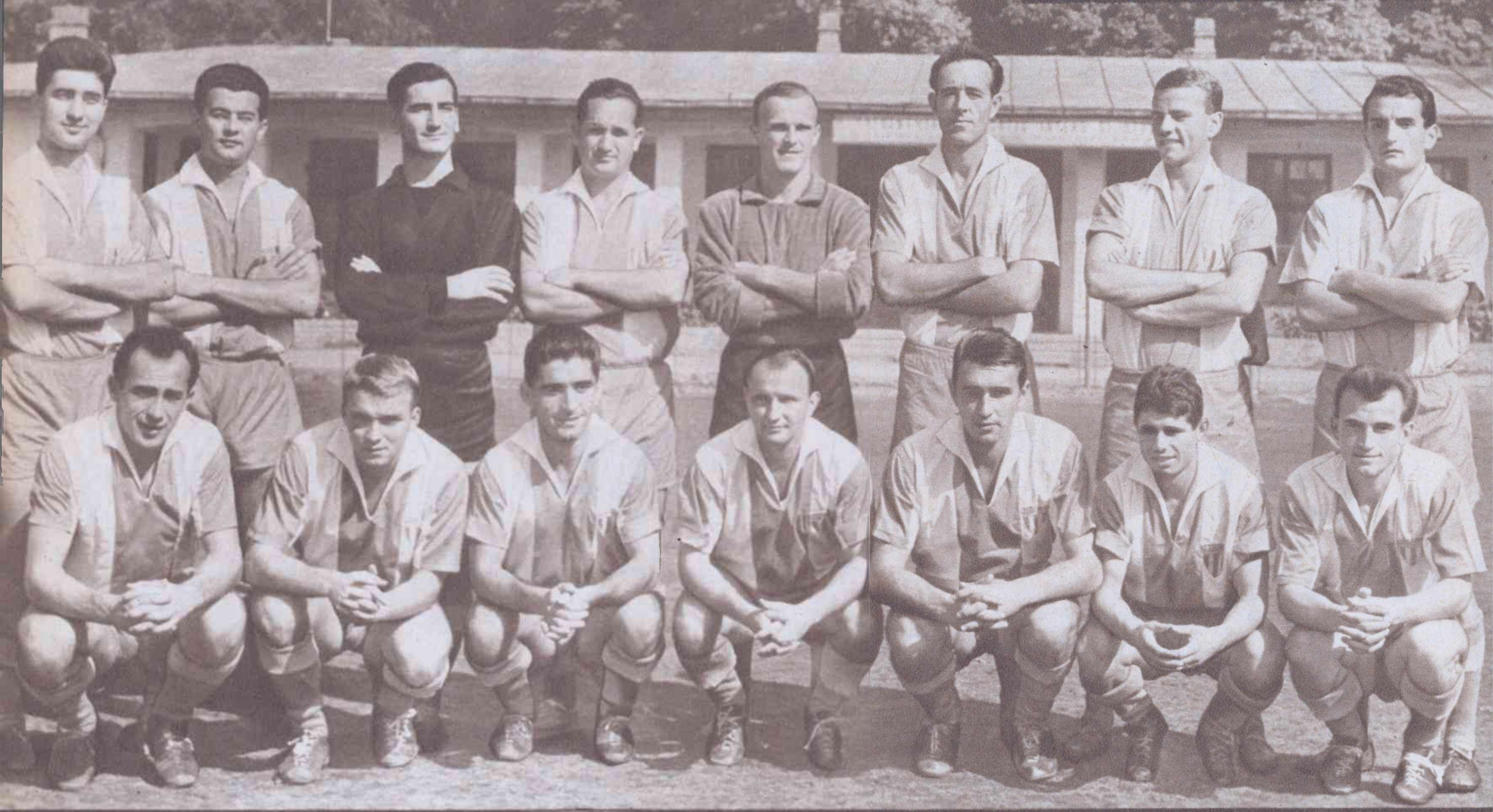
Oaidă (bottom row, first from left) with Progresul București in 1963.

During his 12 seasons spent at the club, Progresul's best finish was a third place in the 1961–62 season. In the same season, he also played in both legs in the second round of the European Cup Winners' Cup as they were eliminated by Leixões after a 2–1 aggregate loss. The Bankers also suffered a relegation in the 1964–65 season, but he stayed with the club, helping it get promoted back to the first league after one season. Oaidă's last Divizia A appearance took place on 15 June 1969, playing in Progresul's 1–0 loss to Farul Constanța, totaling 236 matches with 79 goals in the competition.

== International career ==
Oaidă played six games for Romania, making his debut on 14 September 1958 under coach Augustin Botescu in a 3–2 away friendly loss to East Germany. He played in the two games against Turkey in the Euro 1960 qualifiers. In the first match he opened the score in a 3–0 home victory in Bucharest at the 23 August Stadium. He also appeared once for Romania's Olympic team in the 1960 Summer Olympics qualifiers.

== Managerial career ==
Oaidă began coaching in 1969 at Flacăra Roșie București in Divizia C. In 1971 he became the coach of Libya's national team. One year later he continued to work in Libya at Al-Ahly Benghazi. In 1974 he came back to Romania, working in the lower leagues, first at Mureșul Deva and then for Viitorul Vaslui, Tractorul Brașov, Autobuzul București and Metalul București. Oaidă also had spells in the top-league, Divizia A, first starting from 1976 until 1978 at Progresul București, followed by a spell at Jiul Petroșani in 1979. In the 1980s and 1990s he went to work abroad again in African countries such as Morocco and Egypt. Between 1991 and 1992 he coached in Lebanon at Homenetmen Beirut.

== Personal life and death ==
In 2008, he received the title of honorary president of Progresul București, on the occasion of his 75th birthday, in recognition of his entire activity at the club from Cotroceni.

Oaidă died on 18 January 2025, at the age of 91.

== Career statistics ==
Scores and results list Romania's goal tally first, score column indicates score after each Oaidă goal.

List of international goals scored by Nicolae Oaidă
No.	Date	Venue	Opponent	Score	Result	Competition
1	2 November 1958	Stadionul 23 August, Bucharest, Romania	Turkey	1–0	3–0	1960 European Nations' Cup qualifying

== Honours ==
=== Player ===
Dinamo Bacău

- Divizia B: 1955

Progresul București

- Divizia B: 1965–66
- Cupa României: 1959–60, runner-up 1957–58
