= Ilie Datcu =

Romanian football player and coach (1937–2026)

- Datcu in 1963

Personal information
- Date of birth: 20 July 1937
- Place of birth: Bucharest, Romania
- Date of death: 5 October 2026 (aged 89)
- Height: 1.76 m (5 ft 9 in)
- Position: Goalkeeper

Youth career
- 1950–1954: Constructorul București
- 1955: Metalul Câmpina
- 1956–1957: Progresul CPCS București

Senior career*
Years	Team	Apps	(Gls)
1958–1961	Dinamo Obor București		
1961–1969	Dinamo București	166	(0)
1969–1975	Fenerbahçe	110	(0)
1975–1976	Giresunspor	20	(0)
Total		296	(0)

International career
1963–1967	Romania	13 (Note: Including seven appearances for Romania's Olympic team)	(0)

Managerial career
- 1976: Fenerbahçe
- 1977–1978: Vefa S.K.
- 1978: Çaykur Rizespor
- 1978–1979: Türkiyemspor Berlin
- 1979: Hertha Zehlendorf
- 1979–1980: Eskişehirspor (assistant)
- 1981: Göztepe Izmir
- 1982–1983: Fatih Karagümrük
- 1984: İstanbulspor
- 1984–1985: Göztepe Izmir
- 1985–1986: Denizlispor
- 1986–1987: Kartalspor
- 1987–1988: Diyarbakırspor
- 1988: Bakırköyspor
- 1988–1990: Türk Telekomspor
- 1991: Eskişehirspor
- 1991–1992: Türk Telekomspor
- 1992–1993: Gaziosmanpaşaspor
- 1995–1999: Fenerbahçe (goalkeeping coach)
- 2002–2005: Beşiktaş (goalkeeping coach)
- 2007: Kütahyaspor
- * Club domestic league appearances and goals

Ilie Datcu (20 July 1937 – 5 October 2026) was a Romanian professional football player and coach who played as a goalkeeper, most notably for Dinamo București and Fenerbahçe. He was the goalkeeper for the Romania Olympic football team at the 1964 Summer Olympics, where Romania finished in fifth place.

== Club career ==
=== Early career ===
Datcu was born in Bucharest, Romania on 20 July 1937. He began playing football at the junior squads of Constructorul București in 1950, four years later going to Metalul Câmpina and then joining Progresul CPCS București. He started his senior career in 1958 at Divizia B team Dinamo Obor București. During this three-season spell, the club reached the 1960 Cupa României final, where coach Constantin Teașcă used him the entire match in the 2–0 loss to Progresul București.

=== Dinamo București ===
Datcu in action during the 1963–64 European Cup match against Motor Jena in Bucharest

Datcu went to play for Dinamo București where he made his Divizia A debut on 20 August 1961 in a 4–3 away loss against Dinamo Pitești. He made a total of 20 league appearances in his first season, helping the team win the title, working with coaches Traian Ionescu, Constantin Teașcă and Nicolae Dumitru. In the following three seasons, Datcu won another three titles. In the first two he was coached by Dumitru and Ionescu who used him 13 games in the first one and 26 in the second. For the last title, Datcu played in 24 matches under the guidance of Angelo Niculescu. During his period spent with The Red Dogs, he also won two Cupa României. In the 1964 final, Ionescu played him for the first 85 minutes, then replaced him with Iuliu Uțu in the 5–3 victory against rivals Steaua București, but in 1968, coach Bazil Marian did not use him in the 3–1 win over Rapid București. Datcu also had some achievements in European competitions with Dinamo; during the 1963–64 European Cup campaign, he kept two clean sheets in a 3–0 aggregate win over East Germany champions Motor Jena, though they were defeated in the next round by Real Madrid. He subsequently appeared in a historic 2–1 victory over Inter Milan in the 1965–66 edition, who were the winners of the previous two editions of the competition. Datcu made his last Divizia A appearance on 25 May 1969 in a 4–3 success against UTA Arad, totaling 166 matches in the competition.

=== Fenerbahçe ===
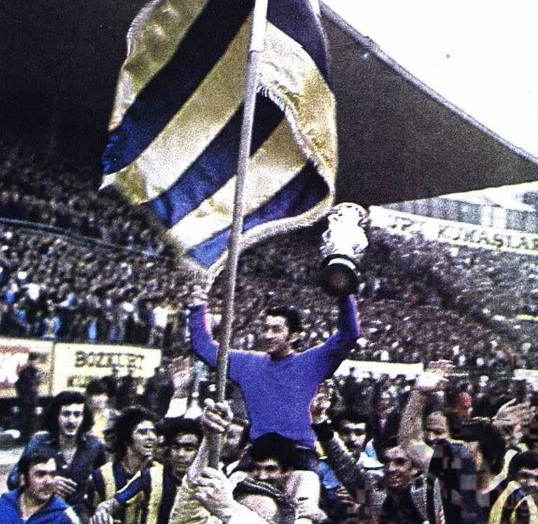
Datcu lifting the Turkish Cup with Fenerbahçe in 1974

In 1969, aged 31, Datcu went to play in Turkey for Fenerbahçe where in his first season he was coached by Traian Ionescu and teamed up with Ion Nunweiller, as the trio had previously worked together at Dinamo. Datcu made his debut in the Turkish league on 28 September in a 0–0 away draw against Altay Izmir. The team claimed the championship title—with Datcu making 29 appearances and conceding only six goals—while he also secured clean sheets during their victorious TSYD Cup run in the 1–0 win over Beşiktaş and the 0–0 draw against Galatasaray. In the following season, he worked with another of his former Dinamo coaches, Constantin Teașcă, alongside his compatriot, Mircea Sasu, and Fenerbahçe finished in second place. In June 1973, he won two trophies under coach Didi, the first being the Prime Minister's Cup following a 5–2 win over Ankaragücü, and the second being the Presidential Cup after a 2–1 victory against Galatasaray. Datcu helped Fenerbahçe get past Argeș Pitești in the first round of the 1973–74 UEFA Cup before they were defeated by Nice in the second round. During the same season, under the guidance of Didi, he helped the team win a treble of trophies. The first trophy won was the TSYD Cup following a 2–2 draw against Galatasaray and a 3–1 win over Beşiktaş. Afterwards, he played in both legs of the 3–1 victory on aggregate over Bursaspor in the Turkish Cup final. He also featured in 21 league matches as Fenerbahçe claimed the league title.

=== Giresunspor ===
Datcu ended his career by spending the 1975–76 season at Giresunspor. His last match in the Turkish league took place on 23 May 1976 in a 3–1 away victory against Galatasaray. Datcu accumulated a total of 130 games in the Turkish League and 22 appearances in European competitions.

== International career ==
Datcu (pictured back row, centre) with the Romania Olympic team in Copenhagen, Denmark (1963)

Datcu played six games for Romania, making his debut on 12 May 1963 under coach Silviu Ploeșteanu in a 3–2 friendly victory against East Germany. He played two matches in the Euro 1968 qualifiers. He also played for Romania's Olympic team, being chosen by Ploeșteanu to be part of the 1964 Summer Olympics squad in Tokyo where he made four appearances, including a 3–0 shutout over Yugoslavia to help Romania earn a fifth-place finish.

== Managerial career ==
Datcu started his managerial career at Fenerbahçe in 1976. He mostly coached in Turkey, working at numerous clubs. In the 1982–83 Turkish Second League season, he helped Fatih Karagümrük gain promotion to the first league after an absence of 20 years. He also worked as a goalkeeper coach, first at Fenerbahçe, where he noticed and promoted Rüştü Reçber, then at Beşiktaş, being brought there by his former teammate from Dinamo and the national team, Mircea Lucescu.

== Personal life and death ==
Datcu resided in Bodrum, Turkey. He also held Turkish citizenship under the name İlyas Datça. He died on 5 October 2026, at the age of 89.

== Honours ==
=== Player ===
Dinamo Obor București

- Cupa României runner-up: 1959–60

Dinamo București

- Divizia A: 1961–62, 1962–63, 1963–64, 1964–65
- Cupa României: 1963–64, 1967–68

Fenerbahçe

- Turkish League: 1969–70, 1973–74
- Turkish Cup: 1973–74
- Presidential Cup: 1973
- Prime Minister's Cup: 1973
- TSYD Cup: 1969, 1973

=== Manager ===
Fatih Karagümrük

- Turkish Second League: 1982–83
