= Constantin Ștefan (footballer, born 1939) =

Romanian footballer

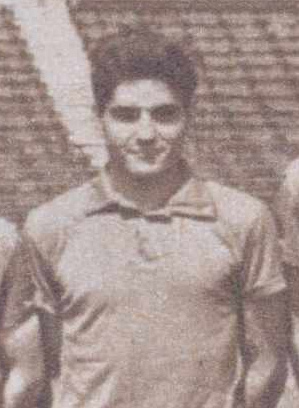

Personal information
- Date of birth: 3 June 1939
- Place of birth: Bucharest, Romania
- Date of death: 12 September 2012 (aged 73)
- Place of death: Bucharest, Romania
- Height: 1.70 m (5 ft 7 in)
- Position: Left back

Youth career
- 1953–1957: Voința București

Senior career*
Years	Team	Apps	(Gls)
1957–1959	CPCS București		
1959–1961	Dinamo Obor București (Note: The statistics for the 1959–60 and 1960–61 Divizia B seasons are unavailable.)	8	(3)
1961–1971	Dinamo București	189	(0)
Total		197	(3)

Managerial career
- 1971–1972: Dinamo Obor București (youth coach)
- 1972–1973: Dinamo București (youth coach)
- 1973–1974: Dinamo Slatina
- 1974–1975: Corvinul Hunedoara
- 1975–1976: Dacia Orăștie
- 1976–1977: Dinamo Slatina
- 1977–1979: Muscelul Câmpulung
- 1979–1981: Pandurii Târgu Jiu
- 1981–1982: Gloria Buzău
- 1982–1983: Progresul Vulcan București
- 1983–1984: ROVA Roșiori
- * Club domestic league appearances and goals as of 24 January 2020

Constantin Ștefan (3 June 1939 – 12 September 2012) was a Romanian footballer who played as a left back.

== Playing career ==
Ștefan was born on 3 June 1939 in Bucharest, Romania. He began playing junior-level football in 1953 at Voința București, starting his senior career in 1957 by playing two years for CPCS București in Divizia B and Divizia C. Afterwards, he joined second league team Dinamo Obor București for two and a half seasons. There, he played the entire match under coach Constantin Teașcă in the 1960 Cupa României final which was lost with 2–0 to Progresul București.

He made his Divizia A debut on 11 November 1961, playing for Dinamo București in a 4–1 away victory against Progresul, making a total of 16 appearances during his first season, as the club won the title, working with three coaches, Traian Ionescu, Constantin Teașcă and Nicolae Dumitru. In the following three seasons Ștefan helped the club win three more titles. In the first two he was coached by Dumitru and Ionescu who used him in 25 games in the first and in 19 matches in the second. In the last one he played 22 matches under the guidance of Angelo Niculescu. During his period spent with The Red Dogs, Ștefan also won two Cupa României. He played the full 90 minutes under Ionescu in the 5–3 victory over rivals Steaua București in the 1964 final, then in the one in 1968 he again played the entire match which was a 3–1 win against Rapid București, being coached by Bazil Marian. Ștefan represented Dinamo in 11 games in European competitions, including a historical 2–1 win over Inter Milan in the 1965–66 European Cup who were the winners of the last two editions of the competition. He won another title in the last season of his career in which Dumitru and Ionescu gave him eight appearances. Ștefan made his last Divizia A appearance on 20 June 1971 in Dinamo's 2–2 draw against Universitatea Cluj, totaling 189 matches in the competition.

== Death ==
Ștefan died on 12 September 2012 at the age of 73 in his native Bucharest.

== Honours ==
Dinamo Obor București

- Cupa României runner-up: 1959–60

Dinamo București

- Divizia A: 1961–62, 1962–63, 1963–64, 1964–65, 1970–71
- Cupa României: 1963–64, 1967–68
