= Petre Cădariu =

Romanian footballer

Personal information
- Date of birth: Unknown
- Place of birth: Romania
- Date of death: Unknown
- Positions: Forward; midfielder

Senior career*
Years	Team	Apps	(Gls)
1951–1954	Politehnica Timișoara (Note: The statistics for the 1952 Divizia B season are unavailable.)	57	(4)
1955–1957	Locomotiva Constanța (Note: The statistics for the 1956 Divizia B season are unavailable.)	19	(2)
1957–1959	Politehnica Timișoara	25	(5)
1959–1960	Dinamo București	3	(1)
Total		104	(12)

International career
1958	Romania	1	(0)
- * Club domestic league appearances and goals as of 18 January 2020

Petre Cădariu was a Romanian footballer who played as a forward. He scored the only goal of the 1958 Cupa României final against Progresul București, which helped Politehnica Timișoara win the first trophy in the club's history. In 2008 Cădariu received the Honorary Citizen of Timișoara title.

== International career ==
Petre Cădariu played one game at international level for Romania in a 1958 friendly against East Germany which ended with a 3–2 loss.

== Honours ==
Politehnica Timișoara

- Divizia B: 1952
- Cupa României: 1957–58
