= Paul Manta =

Romanian footballer

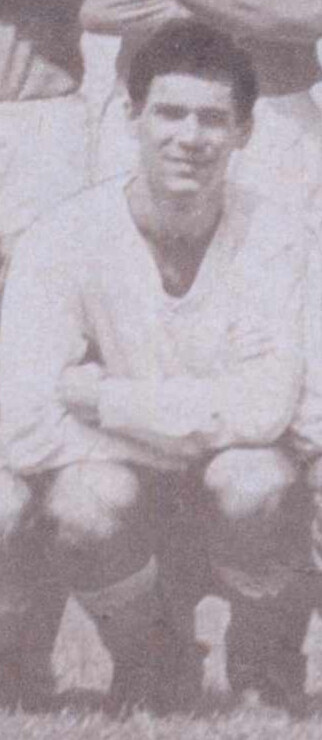

Personal information
- Full name: Paul Virgil Manta
- Date of birth: 2 June 1943
- Place of birth: Bucharest, Romania
- Date of death: 9 August 2005 (aged 62)
- Position: Goalkeeper

Senior career*
Years	Team	Apps	(Gls)
1964–1967	Sportul Studențesc București		
1967–1972	Progresul București	72	(0)
1972–1974	Universitatea Craiova	33	(0)
Total		105	(0)
- * Club domestic league appearances and goals

Paul Manta (2 June 1943 – 9 August 2005) was a Romanian football goalkeeper who played for Sportul Studențesc București, Progresul București and Universitatea Craiova.

== Career ==
Manta was born on 2 June 1943 in Bucharest, Romania. He began playing football in 1964 at Divizia B club Sportul Studențesc București. In 1967 he moved to Progresul București where he made his Divizia A debut on 1 October 1967 when coach Petre Moldoveanu sent him in the 60th minute to replace Petre Mândru in a 3–1 away loss to Dinamo Bacău. The team was relegated at the end of the 1968–69 season, but Manta stayed with the club, helping it gain promotion back to the first league after one year. However, after just one season, the team was once again relegated to the second league. After spending the 1971–72 Divizia B season with Progresul, Manta left the club.

He joined Universitatea Craiova where the team was close to winning the title in the 1972–73 season, but "U" finished in second place on equal points with Dinamo București, losing controversially on the goal difference. This outcome led poet Adrian Păunescu to nickname Craiova as "Campioana unei mari iubiri" (The Champion of a great love). Eventually, Manta helped the team win its first title in the following season, coach Constantin Cernăianu using him in 12 games. That was also the last season of his career, making his last Divizia A appearance on 8 May 1974 in a 1–0 away loss to Dinamo București, totaling 69 matches in the competition.

== Death ==
Manta died on 9 August 2005 at age 62.

== Honours ==
Progresul București

- Diviza B: 1969–70

Universitatea Craiova

- Divizia A: 1973–74
