= 1961–62 Divizia A =

44th season of top-tier football league in Romania

Divizia A
- Season: 1961–62
- Champions: Dinamo București
- Top goalscorer: Gheorghe Constantin (24)

The 1961–62 Divizia A season was the 44th edition of the Romanian football championship and the 24th since the introduction of the divisional system. After six seasons, Divizia A returned to a 14-team format. The season began on 20 August 1961 and concluded on 1 July 1962. Dinamo București won the championship for the second time in its history.

== Teams ==
A total of fourteen teams teams contested the championship, including eleven from the previous season and three newly promoted sides.

=== Team changes ===
Promoted from Divizia B

- Metalul Târgoviște – debut.
- Dinamo Pitești – debut.
- Jiul Petroșani – returned after a one-year absence.

Relegated to Divizia B

- CSMS Iași – ended a one-year stay.
- Farul Constanța – ended a three-year stay.
- Corvinul Hunedoara – ended a one-year stay.

Other changes

- CCA București was renamed Steaua București during the winter break.

=== Managers and locations ===
Location of teams in 1961-62 Divizia A

Club	City	Stadium	Capacity	Head coach
Dinamo Bacău	Bacău	Steaua Roșie	5.000	Andrei Sepci
Dinamo Pitești	Pitești	Ștrand	2.500	Ilie Savu
Dinamo București	București	Dinamo (Note: Dinamo, Progresul, Rapid and Steaua also played several home matches in double-headers at the 23 August Stadium in Bucharest.)	18.000	Nicolae Dumitru
Jiul Petroșani	Petroșani	Jiul	8.000	Bazil Marian
Metalul Târgoviște	Târgoviște	Metalul	8.500	Valentin Stănescu
Minerul Lupeni	Lupeni	Minerul	5.000	Ioan Wetzer
Petrolul Ploiești	Ploiești	Petrolul	14.000	Ilie Oană
Progresul București	București	Progresul	8.000	Gheorghe Nicolae
Rapid București	București	Giulești	18.000	Ion Mihăilescu
Steagul Roșu Brașov	Brașov	Tineretului (Note: Steagul Roșu Brașov played several home matches at the Tractorul Stadium in Brașov)	8.800	Silviu Ploeșteanu
Steaua București	București	Republicii	28.000	Gheorghe Popescu
Știința Cluj	Cluj	Orășenesc	28.000	Andrei Sepci
Știința Timișoara	Timișoara	Știința	3.000	Vasile Gain
UTA Arad	Arad	30 Decembrie	20.000	Ion Reinhardt

=== Managerial changes ===
==== Pre-season ====
Team	Outgoing manager	Replaced by
Dinamo Pitești	(Romania) Vasile Ștefan	(Romania) Ilie Savu
Dinamo Bacău	(Romania) Gheorghe Nicolae	(Romania) Andrei Sepci
Progresul București	(Romania) Ioan Lupaș	(Romania) Gheorghe Nicolae
Știința Timișoara	(Romania) Nicolae Reuter	(Romania) Vasile Gain
CCA București	(Romania) Ștefan Onisie	(Romania) Eugen Mladin
Minerul Lupeni	(Romania) Ion Bălănescu	(Romania) Alexandru Marky

==== During the season ====
Team	Outgoing manager	Position in table		Replaced by
Team	Outgoing manager	Round	Position	Replaced by
Dinamo București	(Romania) Traian Ionescu	13th	3rd	(Romania) Constantin Teașcă
Minerul Lupeni	(Romania) Alexandru Marky	13th	8th	(Romania) Ioan Wetzer
Steaua București	(Romania) Eugen Mladin	13th	9th	(Romania) Gheorghe Popescu
Dinamo București	(Romania) Constantin Teașcă	15th	2nd	(Romania) Nicolae Dumitru

== League table ==
Pos	Team	Pld	W	D	L	GF	GA	GD	Pts	Qualification or relegation
1	Dinamo București (C)	26	14	8	4	62	35	+27	36	Qualification to European Cup preliminary round
2	Petrolul Ploiești	26	13	7	6	57	33	+24	33	Invitation to Inter-Cities Fairs Cup First round
3	Progresul București	26	12	7	7	47	32	+15	31	
4	Steagul Roşu Brașov	26	13	3	10	52	39	+13	29	
5	Rapid București	26	10	8	8	38	37	+1	28	
6	Dinamo Bacău	26	11	5	10	35	36	−1	27	
7	Știința Cluj	26	10	6	10	46	44	+2	26	
8	Știința Timișoara	26	10	5	11	38	42	−4	25	
9	Steaua București	26	10	4	12	53	45	+8	24	Qualification to Cup Winners' Cup preliminary round
10	UTA Arad	26	9	6	11	42	41	+1	24	
11	Minerul Lupeni	26	11	1	14	25	51	−26	23	
12	Jiul Petroșani (R)	26	8	6	12	39	49	−10	22	Relegation to Divizia B
13	Metalul Târgoviște (R)	26	7	5	14	33	66	−33	19	Relegation to Divizia B
14	Dinamo Pitești (R)	26	7	3	16	35	52	−17	17	Relegation to Divizia B

Source: LT
Rules for classification: 1) points; 2) goal average; 3) number of goals scored
(C) Champions; (R) Relegated

=== Results ===
Home \ Away	DIN	PET	PRO	SRB	RAP	BAC	ȘCJ	ȘTM	STE	UTA	LUP	JIU	MET	DPI
Dinamo București	—	0–2	2–2	2–1	0–1	1–0	2–2	0–1	1–1	5–2	7–4	5–2	7–1	2–2
Petrolul Ploiești	1–1	—	1–1	4–1	3–1	4–1	4–0	2–0	2–3	3–1	3–1	7–1	1–0	0–0
Progresul București	1–4	1–1	—	2–1	0–2	1–1	1–1	2–1	4–3	1–2	6–0	4–1	5–0	2–0
Steagul Roşu Brașov	2–1	3–1	1–2	—	3–1	1–2	3–1	1–1	1–0	2–1	4–1	3–0	3–2	4–0
Rapid București	1–2	2–2	2–2	2–2	—	0–2	1–0	1–0	2–1	3–5	3–0	0–0	2–1	2–0
Dinamo Bacău	1–5	3–1	0–2	0–5	3–1	—	4–1	0–0	2–0	0–0	3–0	4–1	2–2	2–0
Știința Cluj	2–2	1–2	1–0	1–3	1–3	3–1	—	4–1	2–2	2–2	4–1	1–0	6–1	5–1
Știința Timișoara	2–2	3–3	1–0	1–2	1–0	1–0	3–1	—	2–3	1–0	3–0	3–0	4–0	2–0
CCA București	0–1	2–6	0–1	4–2	1–2	3–0	1–2	6–2	—	4–2	3–0	4–0	4–0	2–1
UTA Arad	0–1	1–1	1–1	3–1	1–1	2–0	3–1	1–1	2–1	—	2–0	0–1	3–0	3–0
Minerul Lupeni	0–3	1–0	1–0	2–1	1–1	0–2	1–0	1–0	2–1	2–1	—	1–0	2–0	2–0
Jiul Petroșani	0–0	3–1	1–3	0–0	3–1	1–0	1–1	4–0	1–1	3–2	0–1	—	7–0	6–1
Metalul Târgoviște	1–2	2–1	2–0	2–1	2–2	1–1	0–1	4–3	2–2	3–1	1–0	3–3	—	2–1
Dinamo Pitești	3–4	0–1	2–3	3–1	1–1	0–1	1–2	5–1	3–1	3–1	3–1	3–0	2–1	—

Source: LT (in Romanian)
Legend: Blue = home team win; Yellow = draw; Red = away team win.

== Top goalscorers ==
Rank	Player	Club	Goals
1	Gheorghe Constantin	CCA București	24
2	Mircea Dridea	Petrolul Ploiești	22
3	Gheorghe Ene	Dinamo București	19
4	Mircea Sasu	UTA Arad	16
5	Matei Gram	Dinamo Bacău	14
5	Marin Voinea	Progresul București	14

== Champion squad ==
Dinamo București

Goalkeepers: Ilie Datcu (20 / 0); Iuliu Uțu (8 / 0).
Defenders: Cornel Popa (24 / 0); Ion Nunweiller (26 / 3); Dumitru Ivan (26 / 0); Nicolae Panait (1 / 0).
Midfielders: Ilie Constantinescu (11 / 0); Vasile Alexandru (15 / 3); Lică Nunweiller (18 / 0); Constantin Ștefan (16 / 0); Mircea Stoenescu (1 / 0).
Forwards: Ion Pîrcălab (24 / 7); Constantin Frățilă (19 / 5); Gheorghe Ene (20 / 19); Ion Țîrcovnicu (20 / 5); Iosif Varga (15 / 4); Haralambie Eftimie (16 / 11); Constantin David (20 / 4); Tănase Dumitrescu (1 / 0); Aurel Unguroiu (5 / 0); Vasile Anghel (5 / 0).
(league appearances and goals listed in brackets)

Manager: Traian Ionescu / Constantin Teașcă / Nicolae Dumitru.

== See also ==
- 1961–62 Divizia B
- 1961–62 Regional Championship
- 1961–62 Cupa României
