= Florin Cârstea =

Romanian footballer

Florin Cîrstea
Personal information
- Date of birth: 13 September 1972 (age 54)
- Place of birth: Bucharest, Romania
- Height: 1.80 m (5 ft 11 in)
- Position: Forward

Senior career*
Years	Team	Apps	(Gls)
1991–1995	Național București (Note: The statistics for the 1991–92 Divizia B season are unavailable.)	68	(17)
1995–1997	Universitatea Craiova	15	(1)
1998	Rapid București	6	(1)
1998–1999	Apollon Limassol	22	(4)
1999	Enosis Neon Paralimni		
2000	Apollon Limassol		
Total		111	(23)

International career
1994–1995	Romania	3	(0)
- * Club domestic league appearances and goals

Florin Cîrstea (born 13 September 1972) is a Romanian former footballer who played as a forward.

== International career ==
Florin Cîrstea played three games at international level for Romania, making his debut when he came as a substitute and replaced Tibor Selymes in the 84th minute of a 3–0 victory against Azerbaijan at the Euro 1996 qualifiers.

== Honours ==
Național București

- Divizia B: 1991–92

Rapid București

- Cupa României: 1997–98
