= Aurel Beldeanu =

Romanian football player

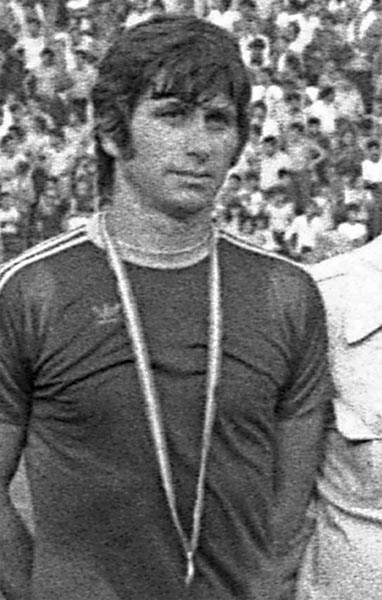

Personal information
- Date of birth: 5 March 1951 (age 75)
- Place of birth: Dobroești, Romania
- Height: 1.80 m (5 ft 11 in)
- Position: Midfielder

Youth career
- 1965–1968: Progresul București

Senior career*
Years	Team	Apps	(Gls)
1968–1972	Progresul București	96	(8)
1972–1976	FCM Reșița	101	(23)
1976–1985	Universitatea Craiova	195	(18)
1984	→ Constructorul Craiova (loan)	7	(0)
1985–1986	Chimia Râmnicu Vâlcea	14	(1)
Total		413	(50)

International career^{‡}
1969–1975	Romania U23	18	(4)
1971	Romania Olympic	1	(0)
1973–1981	Romania B	2	(2)
1973–1981	Romania	18	(1)
- * Club domestic league appearances and goals as of 7 March 2018 ‡ National team caps and goals as of 7 March 2018

Aurel "Aurică" Beldeanu (born 5 March 1951) is a Romanian former professional footballer who played as a midfielder.

== Club career ==
Beldeanu, nicknamed "Vulpea" (The Fox), was born on 5 March 1951 in Dobroești, Romania, but grew up in the Colentina neighborhood of Bucharest. He began playing junior-level football in 1965, aged 14, at his childhood favorite team Progresul București under coaches Ioan Kluge and Nicolae Gorgorin. On 2 November 1968, he made his Divizia A debut under coach Cornel Drăgușin in a 1–1 draw against Dinamo București. However, the team was relegated at the end of the season, but Beldeanu stayed with the club, helping it gain promotion back to the first league after one year. At the end of the 1970–71 season, Progresul was relegated once again and Beldeanu spent another season with them in Divizia B. Subsequently, he came back to Divizia A football, after joining FCM Reșița in 1972. There, during the 1974–75 season he scored a personal record of nine goals.

Beldeanu joined Universitatea Craiova in 1976. He went on to play nine seasons for "U" Craiova, being part of the "Craiova Maxima" generation that won two consecutive league titles in 1980 and 1981. At the first one he contributed with four goals netted in the 30 appearances given to him by coach Valentin Stănescu and in the second he scored one goal in the 17 matches that coach Ion Oblemenco used him. He also won the Cupa României four times, playing in all the finals.

Beldeanu played 28 games and scored five goals for "U" Craiova in European competitions. In the second round of the 1979–80 UEFA Cup, he missed a penalty and scored once with a 25-meter shot in a 4–0 aggregate win over Leeds United, as Universitatea became the first Romanian club that eliminated a team from England in European competitions. Afterwards, they reached the quarter-finals in the 1981–82 European Cup by eliminating Olympiacos and Kjøbenhavns Boldklub, with Beldeanu scoring once against the latter, being eliminated with 3–1 on aggregate by Bayern Munich. He made eight appearances in the 1982–83 UEFA Cup campaign, as they reached the semi-finals where they were eliminated by Benfica on the away goal rule after 1–1 on aggregate. Subsequently, Beldeanu contributed five matches to the 1984–85 UEFA Cup run, helping "U" navigate past Real Betis and Olympiacos before they ultimately fell to Željezničar, against whom he scored once in the round of 16.

In 1984, Beldeanu went to play for a short while at Divizia B club Constructorul Craiova, returning afterwards to Universitatea. Subsequently, in 1985 he joined Chimia Râmnicu Vâlcea where he made his last Divizia A appearance on 30 April 1986 in a 4–0 home loss to Steaua București, totaling 354 matches with 44 goals in the competition.

== International career ==
From 1969 to 1981, Beldeanu was consistently featured for Romania's under-23, Olympic and B teams.

Beldeanu made 18 appearances and scored one goal for Romania, making his debut on 18 April 1973 when coach Valentin Stănescu sent him in the 82nd minute to replace Ion Dumitru in a 2–0 friendly loss to the Soviet Union. Subsequently, he played in a 2–0 home win over Cyprus in the Euro 1980 qualifiers. Then he played in a 4–1 victory against Yugoslavia in the 1977–80 Balkan Cup final. Beldeanu scored his only goal for The Tricoulours in a 2–1 friendly win over Bulgaria. He also played five games during the Euro 1980 qualifiers. He made six appearances during the 1982 World Cup qualifiers which included a 2–1 home victory and a 0–0 away draw against England, but also his last match for the national team, a 0–0 draw against rivals Hungary.

=== International goals ===
Scores and results list Romania's goal tally first, score column indicates score after each Beldeanu goal.

List of international goals scored by Aurel Beldeanu
#	Date	Venue	Opponent	Score	Result	Competition
1	10 September 1980	Yuri Gagarin Stadium, Varna, Bulgaria	Bulgaria	1–0	2–1	Friendly

== Personal life ==
In 2003, Beldeanu received the Honorary Citizen of Craiova title.

== Honours ==
Progresul București

- Divizia B: 1969–70

Universitatea Craiova

- Divizia A: 1979–80, 1980–81
- Cupa României: 1976–77, 1977–78, 1980–81, 1982–83

Romania

- Balkan Cup: 1977–80
