= Haralambie Eftimie =

Romanian former football forward

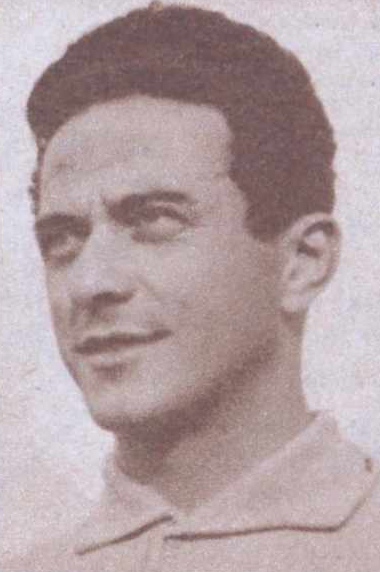

Personal information
- Date of birth: 1 September 1934 (age 92)
- Place of birth: Bucharest, Romania
- Position: Forward

Youth career
- Constructorul București

Senior career*
| Years | Team | Apps | (Gls) |
| 1950–1952 | Constructorul București | | |
| 1952–1957 | Flacăra Roșie București | | |
| 1957–1959 | Dinamo Bacău | | |
| 1959–1963 | Dinamo București | | |
| 1963–1964 | Dinamo Bacău | | |
| 1964–1966 | Știința Craiova | | |
| 1966–1968 | Argeș Pitești | | |

International career
| 1958–1960 | Romania | 3 | (0) |

Managerial career
- 1969–1970: CS Botoșani
- 1970–1971: Independența Sibiu
- 1971–1973: Sirena București
- 1973–1974: Electroputere Craiova
- 1974–1975: Dinamo Slatina
- 1975–1977: Chimia Turnu Măgurele
- 1978–: Sirena București
- 1985–1990: Steaua Mecanica Huși
- 1990: Chimia Turnu Măgurele
- * Club domestic league appearances and goals

Haralambie Eftimie (born 1 September 1934) is a Romanian former football forward and manager. He played for clubs such as Dinamo Bacău, Dinamo București, Știința Craiova and FC Argeș Pitești, also winning two league titles with Dinamo București.

As a manager, Eftimie worked for CS Botoșani, Electroputere Craiova, Dinamo Slatina or Steaua Mecanica Huși, among others, with the latter managing to achieve the highest performances in the club's history.

== International career ==
Eftimie played three matches at international level for Romania, including two at the 1960 European Nations' Cup qualifiers.

== Honours ==
Dinamo București

- Divizia A: 1961–62, 1962–63
