= Andrei Rădulescu (footballer) =

Romanian footballer

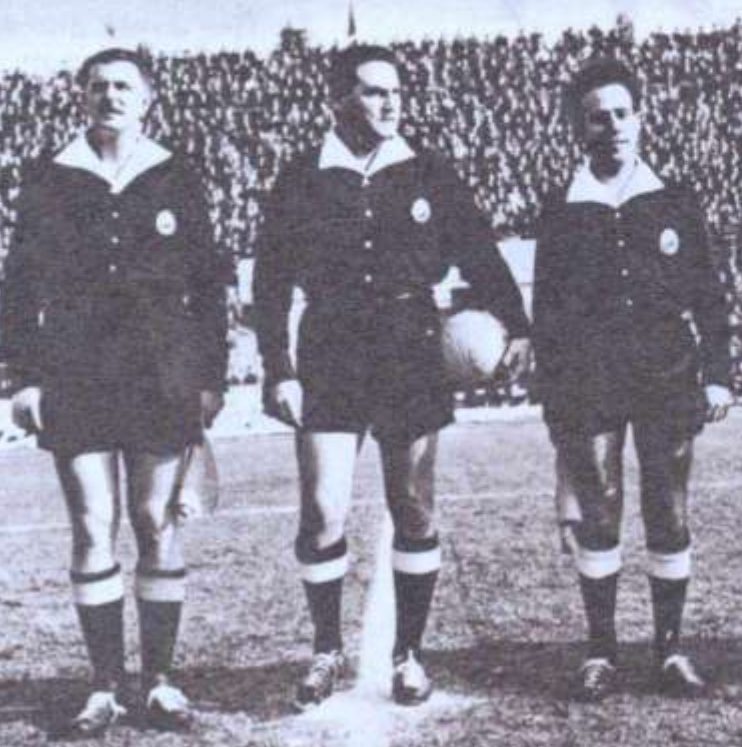
- Andrei Rădulescu (in the middle)

Personal information
- Date of birth: 9 February 1925
- Place of birth: Bucharest, Romania
- Date of death: 1992 (aged 66–67)
- Position: Forward

Youth career
- 1938–1942: Luceafărul București

Senior career*
Years	Team	Apps	(Gls)
1942–1943	Venus București (Note: The Divizia A 1940–41 was the last season before World War II and the Divizia A 1946–47 was the first one after, so the appearances and goals scored during this period for Venus București are not official.)	0	(0)
1943–1949	Politehnica Timișoara		
1950–1954	Rapid București		

International career
1948–1950	Romania	4	(2)
- * Club domestic league appearances and goals

Andrei Rădulescu (9 February 1925 – 1992) was a Romanian football forward, referee, president of the Romanian Football Federation and a basketball player.

== Club career ==
Rădulescu was born on 9 February 1925 in Bucharest, Romania and began playing junior-level football, aged 13 at Luceafărul București. In 1942, he started his senior career at Venus București. Subsequently, he moved to Timișoara where he attended the Politehnica University, and played football for the university's team Politehnica. From 1950 until 1954, Rădulescu played for Rapid București, managing to become the top-scorer of the 1950 Divizia A season with 18 goals scored in 22 matches.

== International career ==
Rădulescu played four games, scoring two goals for Romania, making his debut under coach Iuliu Baratky in a 3–2 victory against Bulgaria in the 1948 Balkan Cup. His next two matches were during the same competition, playing in a 0–0 draw against Poland and in a 5–1 loss to Hungary. Rădulescu's last appearance for the national team was a 6–0 friendly victory against Albania in which he scored two goals.

=== International goals ===
Scores and results list Romania's goal tally first, score column indicates score after each Rădulescu goal.

Goal	Date	Venue	Opponent	Score	Result	Competition
1	8 October 1950	Stadionul Republicii, București, Romania	Albania	2–0	6–0	Friendly
2	8 October 1950	Stadionul Republicii, București, Romania	Albania	5–0	6–0	Friendly

== Basketball career ==
During his years of playing football at Venus București and Politehnica Timișoara, Rădulescu also played basketball in regional championships for Viforul Dacia II București and RGM Timișoara. However, he abandoned that activity in 1948, after Politehnica Timișoara won the promotion to the first league at the requirement of the club's management in order to avoid injuries.

== Refereeing career ==
In 1957, Rădulescu became a football referee, officiating matches in the Romanian top-division Divizia A and the 1960 Cupa României final. Rădulescu also officiated at international and European club level. He was selected to officiate matches in the 1970 World Cup, leading the Belgium – El Salvador game and being a linesman at the Israel – Sweden and Uruguay – Israel games.

== Executive career ==
After he retired from his referee career, Rădulescu worked for the Romanian Football Federation, first as a simple member. Afterwards he was president of the Central Commission of Referees and of other federal commissions in different periods. He also managed to be president of the Romanian Football Federation in two periods, the first one was from February 1981 until July 1983 and the second was in January – February 1990.

== Death ==
He died in 1992.

== Honours ==
=== Club ===
Politehnica Timișoara

- Divizia B: 1947–48

Rapid București

- Divizia B: 1952

=== Individual ===
- Divizia A top scorer: 1950
