= Valeriu Soare =

Romanian footballer

Personal information
- Date of birth: 25 June 1932 (age 94)
- Place of birth: Bucharest, Romania
- Height: 1.75 m (5 ft 9 in)
- Position: Left back

Senior career*
Years	Team	Apps	(Gls)
1954–1963	Progresul București (Note: The 1957 championship called Cupa Primăverii is unofficial, so the appearances and goals scored at that competition for Progresul București are not official.)	148	(3)

International career
1956–1960	Romania	7 (Note: Including 2 appearances for Romania's Olympic team)	(0)
- * Club domestic league appearances and goals

Valeriu Soare (born 25 June 1932) is a Romanian former footballer, playing mainly as central forward. He had played for Progresul București.

== International career ==
Valeriu Soare played five games at international level for Romania, making his debut on 28 June 1956 under coach Gheorghe Popescu I in a friendly which ended with a 2–0 victory against Norway. He also played three games at the 1960 European Nations' Cup qualifiers as Romania reached the quarter-finals where they were defeated by Czechoslovakia, who advanced to the final tournament. He also appeared twice for Romania's Olympic team at the 1960 Summer Olympics qualifiers.

== Honours ==
Progresul București

- Cupa României: 1959–60
