= Alexandru Karikaș =

Romanian footballer

Alexandru Karikaş
Personal information
- Full name: Alexandru Karikaş
- Date of birth: 10 May 1931
- Place of birth: Satu Mare, Romania
- Date of death: 14 April 2007 (aged 75)
- Height: 1.72 m (5 ft 8 in)
- Position: Defender

Senior career*
Years	Team	Apps	(Gls)
1953	CA Câmpulung Moldovenesc	10	(1)
1953–1955	CCA București	45	(9)
1956–1957	Progresul Oradea	23	(3)
1957–1964	Progresul București	152	(7)
Total		230	(20)

International career
1958–1960	Romania	9 (Note: Including 4 appearances for Romania's Olympic team)	(0)
- * Club domestic league appearances and goals

Alexandru Karikaş (10 May 1931 – 14 April 2007) was a Romanian footballer who played for CA Câmpulung Moldovenesc, CCA București, Progresul Oradea and Progresul București between 1953 and 1964.

== Honours ==
=== Club ===
CCA București

- Romanian League: 1953
- Romanian Cup: 1955

Progresul Oradea

- Romanian Cup: 1956

Progresul București

- Romanian Cup: 1959–60
