= Petre Mândru =

Romanian footballer

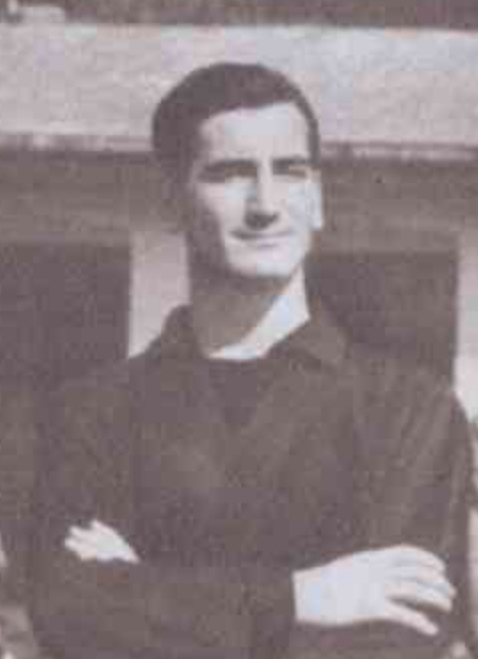
- Mândru with Progresul București

Personal information
- Date of birth: 13 September 1935 (age 91)
- Place of birth: Craiova, Romania
- Height: 1.78 m (5 ft 10 in)
- Position: Goalkeeper

Youth career
- –1955: Știința București

Senior career*
| Years | Team | Apps | (Gls) |
| 1955–1969 | Progresul București (Note: The statistics for the 1957 unofficial championship called Cupa Primăverii are not taken into consideration.) | 208 | (0) |

International career
| 1960–1964 | Romania (Note: Including 3 appearances for Romania's Olympic team.) | 5 | (0) |

Managerial career
- 1971–1973: RC Kouba
- 1973–1974: JS Kabylie
- 1975–1976: Raja Casablanca
- 1976–1977: CODM Meknès
- 1978–1980: Québec XI
- 1981–1983: Montreal Manic (assistant)
- 1984–1986: Montreal Elio Blues
- 1986–1989: Hassania Agadir
- 1989–1990: Montreal Supra
- 1990–1991: Hassania Agadir
- 1991–1992: Montreal Supra
- 1993: Montreal Impact (assistant)
- 1995: New Hampshire Ramblers
- 1999–2000: Montreal Impact (assistant)
- * Club domestic league appearances and goals

Petre Mândru (born 13 September 1935), also known as Pierre Mindru, is a Romanian former football goalkeeper.

He played two games for Romania under head coach Augustin Botescu at the 1960 European Nations' Cup quarter-finals where they were defeated by Czechoslovakia, who advanced to the final tournament. He spent his entire professional career with Progresul București, where he made over 200 league appearances.

After his playing days ended, Mândru became a coach and managed several Algerian and Moroccan clubs. He also managed clubs in Canada and the United States and was Eddie Firmani's assistant head coach at Montreal Manic in the NASL.

His son Christian Mindru was also a goalkeeper who played for the Montreal Impact in the 1990s.

Mândru ran a soccer school in the Montreal area, which lasted from 1984 to 2015.

== Honours ==
=== Player ===
Progresul București

- Romanian Cup: 1959–60

=== Manager ===
JS Kabylie

- Algerian League: 1973–74
