= Vasile Gain =

Romanian footballer

Personal information
- Date of birth: 5 January 1912
- Place of birth: Satchinez, Romania
- Date of death: 23 April 1993 (aged 81)
- Position: Midfielder

Youth career
- 1928–1930: Politehnica Timișoara

Senior career*
Years	Team	Apps	(Gls)
1930–1931	Politehnica Timișoara		
1931–1932	Banatul Timișoara		
1932–1937	Universitatea Cluj	84	(4)
1937–1939	Venus București	26	(0)
1939–1943	Olympia București		
1945–1948	BNR București		
Total		110	(4)

International career
1932–1938	Romania	2	(0)

Managerial career
- 1939–1943: Olympia București
- 1945–1948: BNR București
- 1952–1953: Sportul Studențesc București
- 1953: Universitatea Cluj
- 1956: Avântul Reghin
- 1957–1960: Aurul Brad
- 1961–1962: Politehnica Timișoara
- 1962–1969: CFR Timișoara
- Electromotor Timișoara
- Dinamo Timișoara
- Progresul Timișoara
- * Club domestic league appearances and goals as of 18 January 2020

Vasile Gain (5 January 1912 – 23 April 1993) was a Romanian football midfielder and a manager.

== International career ==
Gain played two games at international level for Romania.

== Honours ==
=== Player ===
Venus București

- Divizia A: 1938–39

Universitatea Cluj

- Cupa României runner-up: 1933–34

=== Manager ===
BNR București

- Divizia C: 1946–47

CFR Timișoara

- Divizia C: 1965–66
