= Cornel Drăgușin =

Romanian football manager (1926–2021)

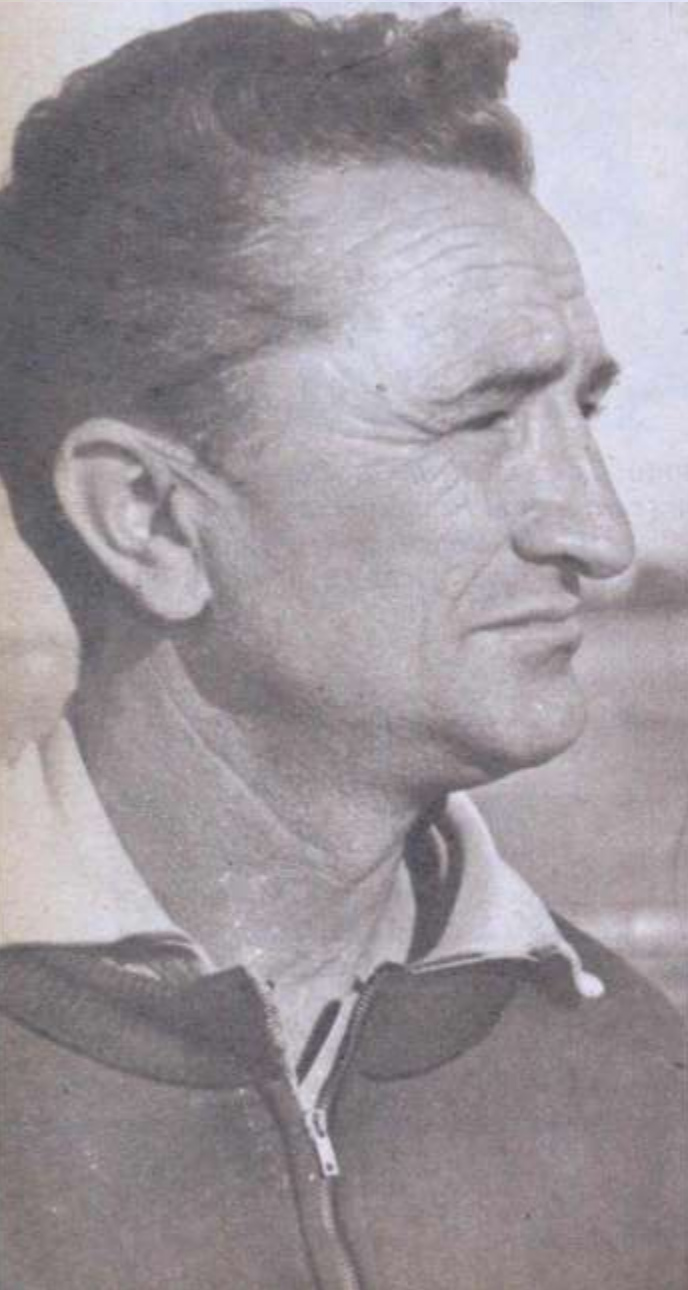
- Drăgușin in 1968

Personal information
- Date of birth: 26 March 1926
- Place of birth: Bucharest, Romania
- Date of death: 10 October 2021 (aged 95)
- Place of death: Bucharest, Romania

Youth career
- 1936–: Industria Iutei București
- –1948: Sindicatul Textil București

Senior career*
Years	Team	Apps	(Gls)
1949–1950	Steaua București	0	(0)

Managerial career
- 1950–1953: Steaua București (youth)
- 1953–1958: Progresul București (youth)
- 1958–1959: Progresul București
- 1959–1960: Progresul București (assistant)
- 1960: Progresul București
- 1960–1962: Progresul București (assistant)
- 1962–1963: Iraq
- 1963–1964: Progresul București
- 1965–1966: Syria
- 1966–1967: Romania U23
- 1968–1969: Progresul București
- 1969–1970: Steaua București (assistant)
- 1970–1975: Romania U23
- 1975–1976: Romania
- 1976–1978: Romania (assistant)
- 1978–1983: Romania U21
- 1983–1985: Romania Olympic
- 1986–1990: Romania (assistant)
Medal record
Men's football
Representing Syria (as manager)
Arab Cup
Runner-up	1966
- * Club domestic league appearances and goals

Cornel Drăgușin (26 March 1926 – 10 October 2021) was a Romanian football manager who coached the national teams of Iraq, Syria and Romania. He was director of the Romanian FA coaching school from 1990 to 2002, before being replaced by Mircea Rădulescu.

== Playing career ==
Drăgușin was born on 26 March 1926 in Bucharest, Romania and began playing football in 1936 at local club Industria Iutei. Afterwards he went to Sindicatul Textil București where he stayed until 1948. In 1949 he arrived at Steaua București where he met coach Ferenc Rónay who encouraged him to start coaching at age 25.

== Managerial career ==
Drăgușin's first coaching spell was at the youth of Steaua București from 1950 until 1953. He then managed the youth team of Progresul București, where he won the national youth championship in 1954. Afterwards he moved up to the reserves and finally the A team, alongside Ioan Lupaș, managing to reach the 1958 Cupa României final which was lost with 1–0 to Știința Timișoara. In the following two years he continued to work at Progresul, being an assistant, as the team won the 1959–60 Cupa României, also having a short spell as head coach.

In 1962, the Iraq Football Association opted for a foreign coach from the Eastern Bloc, and appointed the Romanian manager as head coach of the Iraq national team. Drăgușin was the first foreign coach of Iraq and at the beginning of his tenure, he was supervised by colonel Abdul Salam Arif who later became the country's president.

After his return from Iraq in 1963, Drăgușin joined Progresul again with coach Dincă Schileru for the 1963–64 season, before taking charge of the Syrian national team in 1965. He led Syria at the 1965 Arab Games, earning a 13–0 win against Muscat and Oman and a 4–0 victory over Lahej but lost to Libya and Sudan, failing to progress from the group stage. Afterwards he reached the 1966 Arab Cup final, losing it with 2–1 to Iraq.

Upon his return, the Romanian FA appointed Drăgușin as manager of the Romania under–23 side for a tournament in Central Africa. In 1968, he returned to Progresul, before moving to Steaua București as assistant manager.

In November 1970, Drăgușin was recruited by the Romanian Football Federation, for whom he worked until 2002. During that time, he coached the Under–23, Under–21 sides and the Olympic team. He also led Romania's main team for one game, a 1–1 draw against Scotland in the Euro 1976 qualifiers.

Between 1986 and 1990, he was Emerich Jenei's assistant coach at the Romania national team, which qualified for the 1990 FIFA World Cup in Italy.

Drăgușin was director of the Romanian FA coaching school from 1990 until 2002, a period during which some of the best players in Romania obtained their coaching licenses, including Dan Petrescu, Gheorghe Hagi, Ilie Dumitrescu, Ioan Andone, Ioan Sabău, Mircea Rednic, Gavril Balint and Dorinel Munteanu.

== Writing ==
In 1969, he spent nearly two months visiting some of the top English clubs including Manchester United, Chelsea, and Arsenal. On his return, he wrote a book, În patria fotbalului (In Football's Homeland) which was released in 1970.

== Death ==
Drăgușin died on 10 October 2021 at age 95 in his native Bucharest.

== Honours ==
=== Manager ===
Progresul București

- Cupa României runner-up: 1957–58

Syria

- Arab Cup runner-up: 1966
