= Eugen Mladin =

Romanian footballer (1921–?)

Personal information
- Date of birth: 22 June 1921
- Place of birth: Romania

Senior career*
Years	Team	Apps	(Gls)
1947–1949	Steaua București	33	(2)
- CA Arad
- Gloria Arad
- Prahova Ploieşti
Total		33	(2)

Managerial career
- 1954: Ştiinţa Timişoara
- 1955: Locomotiva Constanţa
- 1956: Ştiinţa Timişoara
- 1957–1958: UTA Arad
- 1960: Ştiinţa Timişoara
- 1961: Steaua București
- 1964–1966: Jiul Petrila
- 1966–1967: Universitatea Cluj
- 1969: FC Argeş
- * Club domestic league appearances and goals

Eugen Mladin (born 22 June 1921) was a Romanian footballer and manager.
