= Augustin Botescu =

Romanian football manager

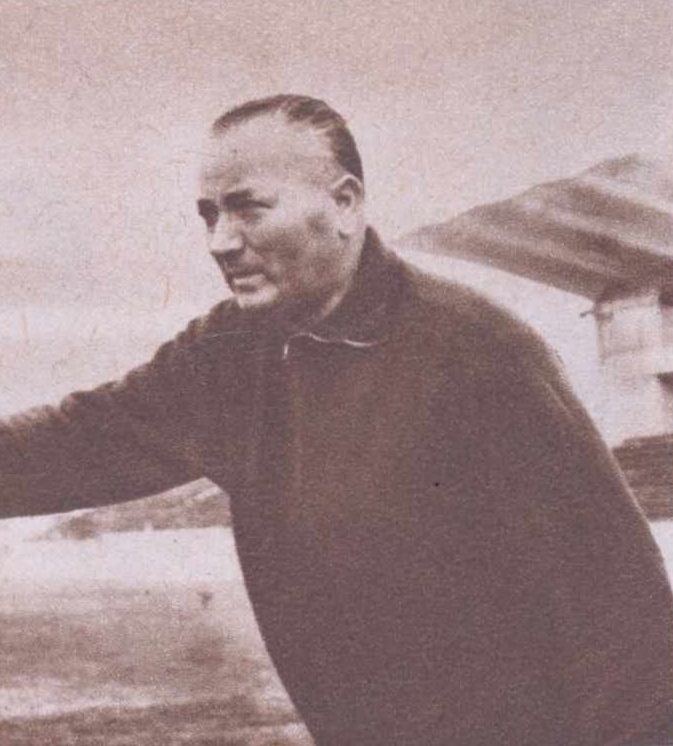

Personal information
- Place of birth: Băilești, Romania

Managerial career
- Years: Team
- 1948–1949: Metalul București
- 1956: Gloria Bistrița
- 1958–1960: Romania
- 1959–1960: Romania Olympic
- 1959–1960: Progresul București
- 1960–1963: Farul Constanţa
- 1965–1967: Politehnica Iași
- 1969–1974: FCME București

Augustin Botescu was a Romanian football manager who coached Romania at the 1960 European Nations' Cup qualifiers and Romania's Olympic team at the 1960 Summer Olympics qualifiers, failing to qualify for both tournaments. He has a total of 7 games as the national team manager, consisting of 2 victories and 5 losses (11 games, 3 victories, one draw, 7 losses, including Romania's Olympic team games). Botescu won as a manager the Romanian Cup with Progresul București in 1960. He coached Metalul București, Progresul București, Farul Constanţa and Politehnica Iași in 141 Divizia A games. Botescu also worked as an accountant.

== Honours ==
Progresul București

- Cupa României: 1959–60
