= FC Progresul București =

Progresul București
- Full name: Fotbal Club Progresul București
- Nicknames: Bancarii (The Bankers); Cavalerii frunzei de platan (The Knights of the Sycamore Leaf)
- Short name: Progresul
- Founded: 10 May 1944
- Dissolved: 2009
- Ground: Cotroceni
- Capacity: 14,542
Home colours	Away colours

Fotbal Club Progresul București, commonly known as Progresul București or simply as Progresul, was a Romanian football club based in Bucharest.

The team was founded in 1944 as B.N.R. București, being the team of the National Bank of Romania (B.N.R.). In 1947, B.N.R. was promoted to Divizia B. In 1955, B.N.R. made its debut in Divizia A, under the name of Progresul Finanțe Bănci București. Since then, Progresul has experienced various successes and setbacks, in total spending no less than 32 seasons in the top flight, being ranked 15th in the Liga I All-Time Table. Progresul was runner-up of the league three times (1995–96, 1996–97, 2001–02), won the Romanian Cup in the 1959–60 season, and was also the finalist of the Cup on four other occasions (1957–58, 1996–97, 2002–03, 2005–06).

Unlike the three biggest teams of Bucharest and Romania—Steaua, Dinamo and Rapid—Progresul was not historically supported by the communist regime. This, however, drew the sympathy of many supporters, including actors, artists and the then-bourgeoisie of Bucharest.

In April 2009, due to financial problems, Progresul was kicked out from the Cotroceni Stadium by the National Bank of Romania, which was no longer part of the club, but was still the owner of the stadium. In the same month, the club was excluded from the Liga II and subsequently declared bankrupt.

One of Romania's most well known footballers, Dan Petrescu, finished his career at the club.

== History ==
=== Founding, early years and success (1944–1970) ===
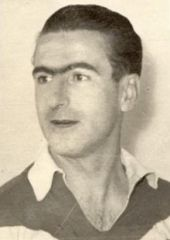
Titus Ozon, a legend of Progresul București and Romanian football, being ranked 10th in the top ten highest goalscorers of Liga I, with 157 goals.

FC Progresul București was founded as B.N.R. București on 10 May 1944 at the initiative of Nicolae Pop Sr. and Traian Pătrașcu, who proposed the creation of a football team to the National Bank of Romania at a meeting at the I. Vidrighin Hotel in Rășinari. The idea was quickly embraced by the bankers present, and the club was subsequently formed. Initially, no formal constitution was signed, an issue which remained unresolved for several years, until one was informally written by a local writer Valentin Căltuț, based on the wishes of Nicolae Pop Jr. (son of Nicolae Pop Sr.) and founding members Peter Lambru, Iosif Micu, Petre Mihăilescu, Ernest Rădulescu, and Constantin Stoian.

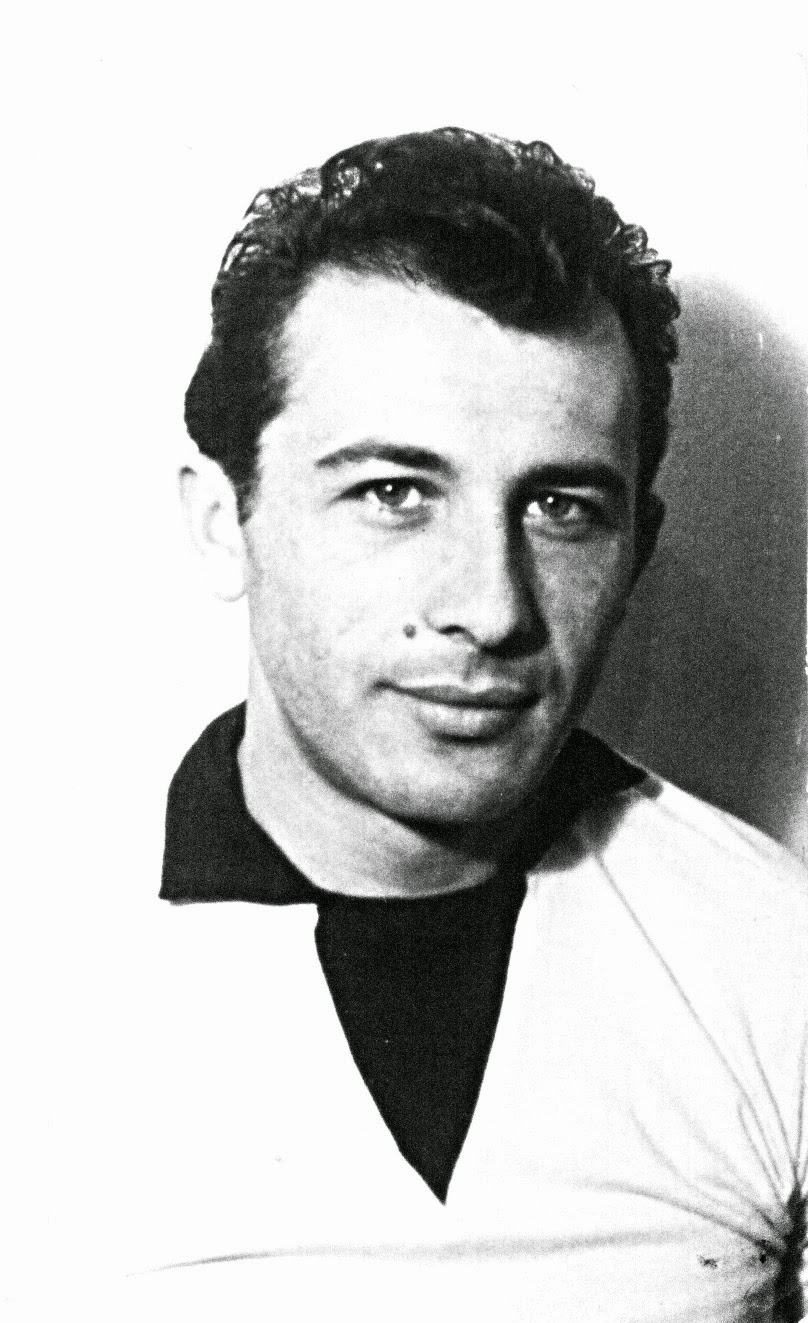
Nicolae Oaidă, a legend of Progresul București with 226 matches played for "the bankers" in the Divizia A and Divizia B.

After only two seasons spent in the third tier, "the Bankers" promoted to Divizia B at the end of the 1946–47 season, being ranked 8th of 16 at the end of their inaugural season. In the summer of 1948, B.N.R. București was renamed as Banca de Stat București, before being renamed Spartac București the following year. 1955 was the first season spent by "the bleu and blues" on the main stage of Romanian football, Divizia A. Their successful performance and style of play impressed football fans in Romania, fostering a growing fan base for the organization. Approaching the championship with only one well-known player (Titus Ozon), who co-ordinated a group of players who were unknown at the time, the team eventually ranked 3rd of 13, ahead of leading clubs like CCA București or Știința Cluj. Titus Ozon also led "the barbers" into trailing results from the 1950s (1955 – 3rd, 1956 – 9th and 1957–58 – 4th). The squad of Progresul in the first season of Divizia A was composed of: Popovici, Gică Andrei, Bratu, Paraschiv, Soare, Colosi, Ciocea, Banciu, Cosma, Știrbei, Cacoveanu, Fusulan, Dragomir, Dobrescu, Cruțiu, M. Smărăndescu, Tănase, Mihăilescu, E. Iordache and Ioan Lupaș (head coach).

In the summer of 1958, several prominent players left the team: first Ozon, then Moldoveanu, Dinulescu and Cojocaru. Some new players also came: Maior, Nedelcu, Nicu Smărăndescu, Ioniță, Baboie, Mafteuță, Marin, Birn or Vasilescu. At the 1958–59 season, the team was ranked 6th and reached the semi-finals of the Romanian Cup; there Progresul missed the chance to play the final, losing the match against Baia Mare with 1–2. The second semi-final took place between Dinamo București and Rapid București (5–3), which saw Ozon play his first match after a one-year career break as part of the Rapid team.

Progresul's 1959–60 squad.

In the 1959–60 season, the team was ranked 9th with a squad led by international players such as Mândru, Karikaș, Soare and Oaidă, Progresul conquered the Romanian Cup, achieving a great performance: 15 goals scored and only one conceded. The final was played between Progresul and Dinamo Obor at Republicii Stadium in front of 30,000 spectators. Progresul won the match, with goals scored by Oaidă and Soare. The squad that brought the first cup to Dr. Staicovici street was composed of: Mândru – Nicu Smărăndescu, Karikaș, Soare – Ioniță, Maior – Oaidă, Mafteuță, Marin, Mișu Smărăndescu and Protopopescu. Despite earning the right to participate in the 1960–61 European Cup Winners' Cup by winning the Romanian Cup, the team were barred from doing so by communist authorities, who disliked the players' conduct at the Cup's award ceremony.

Chart of yearly table positions of Progresul București in the national leagues.

In the 1960–61 championship edition, the bankers ranked 9th, as in the previous one. At the Cup, they reached the quarter-finals, where they were eliminated by Steaua. The team finished at the following positions in subsequent seasons: (1961–62 – 3rd, 1962–63 – 9th and 1963–64 – 4th), before ending last at the end of the 1964–65 season and being relegated to the second division.

With a valuable squad, the team was expected to return to the first division shortly. After a close battle against Știința București, they confirmed those expectations. At the promotion round, Progresul entered in the first eleven players such as Mateianu, Mândru, Oaidă, Baboie, Unguroiu, Colceriu, Adrian Constantinescu or Mafteuță. In the first season after promotion, the team ended at the 10th position, and were subsequently almost relegated again after finishing 13th out of 14 at the end of the 1967–68 season. At second-to-last place, the team played a promotion/relegation play-off where, together with Crișul Oradea, they qualified for the next season of Divizia A, to the detriment of Steagul Roșu Brașov and Politehnica Galați. However, the team's weak form only led them to relegation in the next season, when they finished 15th out of 16. Nonetheless, the team was once again promoted after only one season, starting the 1970s as a Divizia A member.

=== Ups and downs, years of exile (1970–1990) ===
After the first rounds of the new season, another great player of the team, Viorel Mateianu, retired from his professional career. The new players Raksi, Pavlovici and Dudu Georgescu also made their debut in the first squad; Dudu Georgescu would also join later at the European Golden Shoe. Despite the fact that during the second part of the 1970–71 season, Progresul housed one of the most talented teams in its history, with a middle line comprising Kassai and Beldeanu, a forward line composed of Sandu Ion, Dudu Georgescu, Mircea Sandu and Viorel Năstase, and a defensive comprising Tănăsescu and Filipescu, the weak results from autumn sentenced them to relegation.

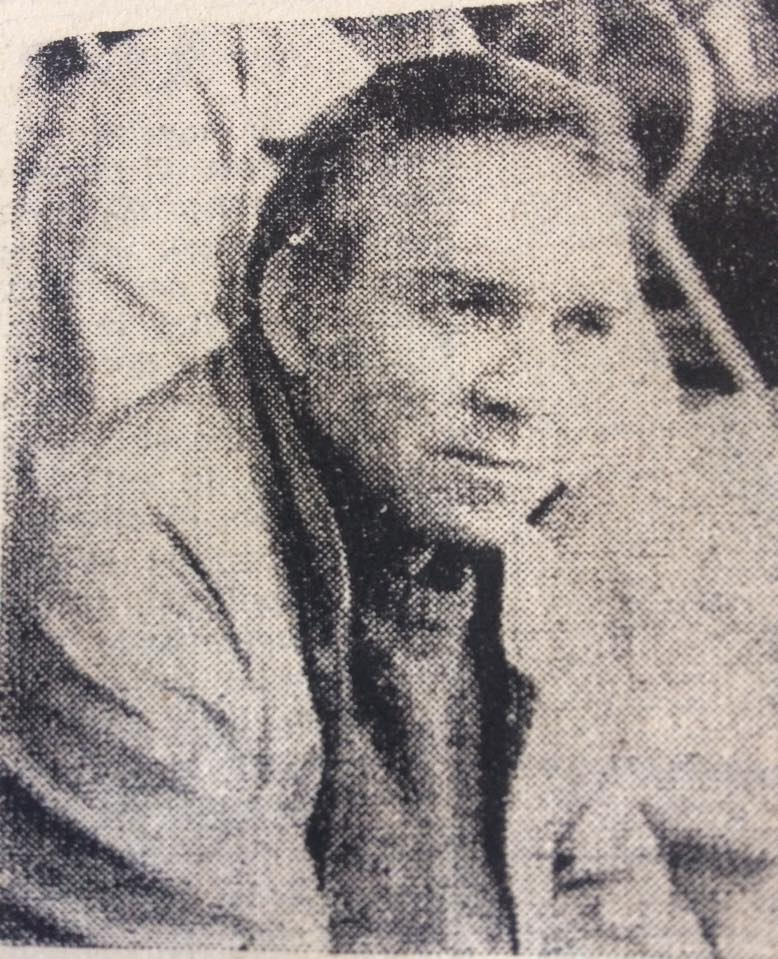
Viorel Mateianu, former player and manager of the club.

After relegation, the many of Progresul's talents left. Mircea Sandu and Viorel Năstase were transferred in the summer; at the end of the season, the team took second place behind Sportul Studențesc, resulting in the losses of Paul Manta, Adalbert Kassai, Nicolae Tănăsescu, Gabriel Raksi and Aurel Beldeanu. In the 1972–73 edition, the team was ranked as a middle-table squad of the second tier. It was only in 1976 that the team promoted into Divizia A again, after three seasons spent in the second division. The joy of promotion was a short one, however. After a season spent in the top flight, Progresul relegated again in 1977, after finishing only 17th out of 18. The inconsistency of the team continued over the next few years, especially due to financial problems, and the youthfulness of the team. After two mediocre campaigns, the team would promote again in the summer of 1980, this time under the name of Progresul Vulcan București, finishing at only two points ahead of Rapid București.

Period	Name
1944–1948	B.N.R. București
1948–1949	Banca de Stat București
1949–1952	Spartac Banca RPR București
1953	Spartac Finanțe Bănci București
1954–1957	Progresul Finanțe Bănci București
1958–1977	Progresul București
1978–1988	Progresul Vulcan București
1988–1989	Progresul Energia București
1989–1991	Progresul Șoimii București
1991–1994	Progresul București
1994–2007	FC Național București
2007–2009	Progresul București

The 1980s started with a tough season for Progresul, which managed to stay in the first division by having a better goal difference than Politehnica Iași after scoring a goal at the end of the last day of the season. The team also secured victories against Steaua (1–0) and Universitatea Craiova (3–2). At the following championship, Progresul relegated, alongside Universitatea Cluj and UTA Arad. In the 1980s, teams such as FC Olt Scornicești, Flacăra Moreni and Victoria București appeared in the first stage of Romanian football.

Management of the club tried to replace Mateianu, who returned to the team after a successful stint at Baia Mare, with Robert Cosmoc. The results were unsatisfactory and in the spring, the team reached only 10th place. The journalist Radu Cosașu, a sympathizer of the team, wrote about this period: "Throughout these years, Progresul has strengthened me through suffering."

The decade continued in a bad rhythm for the team, which could not promote to the first league for six years, in which it finished at the following positions: 1983–84 – 10th, 1984–85 – 3rd, 1985–86 – 2nd, 1986–87 – 2nd. After three unsuccessful seasons, an overall lack of success and the decommissioning of the team's own Dr. Staicovici Stadium, the club was demoralized, and could only play its home matches at various other stadiums (Autobuzul, Giulești, ICSIM, Mecanica Fină, Metalul, 23 August, Voința, etc.).

The 1987–88 season was a disastrous one. During this season, Progresul collected only 14 points, and head coach Paul Popescu resigned. The club then went through a number of coach replacements in short succession: Marin Moraru and Vasile Aelenei in the first part of the season, Costică Toma and Adrian Rusu in the second part of the season, and then Nicolae Lupescu. The series of Divizia B was won in that season by Inter Sibiu; Progresul, after 40 years, was relegated to the lower leagues of the Romanian football. Twelve players left the club afterwards, in their place arriving at least twenty-five, many of them having been promoted from youth squads, or having returned after completing military service. Very few of them succeeded; among the valuable players were Liviu Ciobotariu, Cristian Diaconu, Carol Marina and Valentin Oprea, who each stayed for at least five consecutive years and later went on to contribute to the return of Progresul in the first division.

The club's next season, in the Divizia C, was started under the name of Progresul Energia București, with a new chairman, Dan Ionescu, and a new manager, Paul Popescu. The club also reduced the size of the squad from 38 to 24 players. Unfortunately, the club was ranked only 2nd in its series at the end of the season, after Mecanică Fină București. During the 1989–90 season, events took a happy turn for the barbers. The Romanian Revolution resulted in a change in the organization of the National Bank of Romania. With new institutional support, Gheorghe Cristoloveanu as a new manager, and a squad debuting the young striker Florin Cârstea, Progresul won the series with five points ahead of second place. It, along with Metalul București, promoted into Divizia B after two tough seasons. The first season after the promotion was not a great one; the club finished only 14th in the second series. Nonetheless, the season saw Tinel Petre made his debut at the first squad.

=== Back home, the most beautiful years (1990–2000) - FC Național București ===
The club returned at the start of the 1991–92 season to the old name of Progresul București, with the National Bank as the main sponsor. Vlad Soare, back then, deputy governor of the National Bank, took over the club; beneficial effects were seen immediately. A few valuable players are brought in to cover up suffering positions; Vasile Simionaș was named manager with Dumitru Ștefan as assistant manager; and a long-term program was implemented. Progresul started well in the season, but the second part proved to be more difficult, as Gloria CFR Galați was also in the fight for the first place with the threat of an impressive comeback. Eventually, the club promoted with a total of 47 points, returning to the first stage of the Romanian football league system after 10 years.

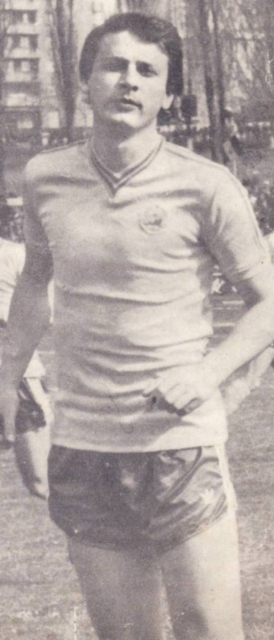
Gino Iorgulescu, former player and chairman of the club from 1994 until 2005.

At their first season, the club ranked only 15th out of 18. However, the team started to grow in value, and with it, the results. During the 1993–94 season, Simionaș left the club, but in his place appeared three important coaches: Jackie Ionescu, Viorel Kraus and Gelu Cristoloveanu. Players such as Cârstea, Liță, Tinel Petre, Potocianu or Luțu also made their debut for Romania national football team. From an administrative point of view, Cornel Dinu was named as chairman of SC Progresul SA, an entity which aimed to bring the team up to European standards. Progresul displayed good football, finishing 9th at the end of the season, far away from relegation worries.

The middle of the 1990s was probably the best period in the history of the club, at least since the end of the 1950s. In the summer of 1994, Progresul was renamed again, this time as FC Național București, with an honorary president, Ilie Năstase. The team, led from the bench by Liță Dumitru, had an impressive start of the season by defeating Petrolul Ploiești 4–1, Universitatea Craiova 3-2 and Gloria Bistrița 3-1 (at home); Oțelul Galați 5–2, UTA Arad and FC Argeș Pitești 3-0 (away). However, Progresul lost 0–6 in Ghencea, but entered in the winter break as leader of the first division. The first seven rounds of the second part of the season were very weak, seeing Progresul recording five defeats and two draws. Liță Dumitru was then sacked and replaced by Viorel Hizo, who had been recently sacked by Rapid. The club ended the championship in the 6th position. It was believed by the majority of supporters that Cornel Dinu's departure to Dinamo contributed to the drop in form. Former player of the team, Gino Iorgulescu, as also elected chairman that season, and Marin Dună was very close of being the goalscorer of the Romanian championship, ending at the third position of the podium.

Progresul's 1996–97 squad.

From the first round of the 1995–96 season, FC Național practiced at the recently built Cotroceni Stadium, which had covered stands, electronic scoreboards and modern floodlights. Next to the stadium was a new gym, a micro-hotel, and a tennis complex. Almost 10 years after the closing down of Dr. Staicovici Stadium, the team could finally play their home matches again in the Sycamore Park. The move was auspicious, so, at the end of the first part of the season, Progresul ranked 6th; the start was not too good, the team being last after seven rounds, but new coach Florin Halagian, and Gino Iorgulescu's management, managed to recover the situation.

On 20 April 1996, at the Cotroceni Stadium, supporters of the team changed against FC Brașov: "Vice-champions, vice-champions!". At the match, Progresul climbed from the middle of the table to second place, from a 6-17 goal difference to 60-44 and 60 points. Team captain Marin Dună ranked second in the top scorer's table with 17 goals scored, but later being overtaken only by Ion Vlădoiu, who scored 25. Dună also was ranked second in a list by Radio România Actualități of the best footballer of the year, but losing to Adrian Ilie.

1996–97 season started with a UEFA Cup foray by the team, who were eliminated in the third preliminary round by Club Brugge, 1–3 on aggregate, but not before eliminating teams like Chornomorets Odesa and FK Partizan. 1997 was another outstanding year for FC Național, which was again ranked again second, after a match against Steaua București. That year, the team reached the Romanian Cup Final, where they lost 2–4, against Rapid București.

After two great seasons, the bankers remained for the next years in the first part of the table, with slight dips in position: 1997–98 – 5th, 1998–99 – 7th and 1999–2000 – 9th.

=== Last performances and relegation (2000–2009) ===
After obtaining 7th place at the end of the 2000–01 season, FC Național started the 2001–02 edition of Divizia A with a new ownership and new hopes to repeat the peaks achieved during the 90s. On 17 July 2001, Mugdin Hadzibegović, a Bosnian businessman, agreed to buy 60% of the club's shares. Iorgulescu stepped aside, and Cosmin Olăroiu became the general manager of the club. But as no one tried to verify the Bosnian's creditworthiness, financial problems only worsened. On 23 August, 15 players announced their departure. The next day, the executive committee of the Romanian Football Federation withdrew Hadzibegović's license, and the team went back to its old leadership, with Gino Iorgulescu as president and Cosmin Olăroiu manager.

Progresul's 2001–02 squad.

Nonetheless, at the season, with an experienced squad including players such as Cristian Munteanu, Bogdan Vintilă, Corneliu Papură, Adrian Matei, Dan Potocianu, Gabriel Popescu and Radu Niculescu, the club was in the top of the league with one point ahead of Dinamo one day before the last of the season. In the last round, Dinamo won 4–0 against FC Brașov, while FC Național played against Universitatea Craiova at their home Ion Oblemenco Stadium, in front of 30,000 fans. However, at the round itself, Universitatea Craiova fans cheered instead for FC Național, owing to the rivalry between Craiova and Dinamo, and as many Craiova players were to leave for Dinamo after the round. Yet, in front of the biggest crowd that ever supported them, FC Național lost 1–2, sending the title to Dinamo.

The 2002–03 season started with another participation in the UEFA Cup. As in 1996, the team reached the third preliminary round, where they were eliminated by Paris Saint-Germain, 0–3 on aggregate. In the first two rounds, they eliminated with 3–2 on aggregate, firstly KF Tirana, then Heerenveen. Their last European participation was followed by mediocre seasons, generally in middle-table positions (2002–03 – 8th, 2003–04 – 7th, 2005–06 – 6th), but nonetheless with three peaks—a 4th place at the end of the 2004–05 season and two Romanian Cup finals in 2003 and 2006, both lost 0–1 against Dinamo București and Rapid București respectively.

After a summer that brought important names to the Sycamore Park, such as Cătălin Cursaru, Erik Lincar, Claudiu Drăgan, Florentin Dumitru, the club reached 3rd place in the new season. The new coach, Marin Dună, was a former player and a club legend. Still, after many consecutive defeats and only two wins in the autumn, Marin Dună was sacked, and Ion Vlădoiu was appointed as the new manager. He obtained a qualification for the team at the quarter-finals of the Romanian Cup, against FCM Bacau, but was nonetheless subsequently replaced by Liviu Ciobotariu, who was later replaced by Sorin Cârțu. The team still lost to Dinamo away, 0–1, with a goal scored by Ionel Ganea, in the 90th minute. The series of consecutive defeats continued for the bankers, and Cârțu resigned. Eugen Nae was appointed as an interim coach, but FC Național nonetheless could not avoid relegation, finally finishing in 16th place.

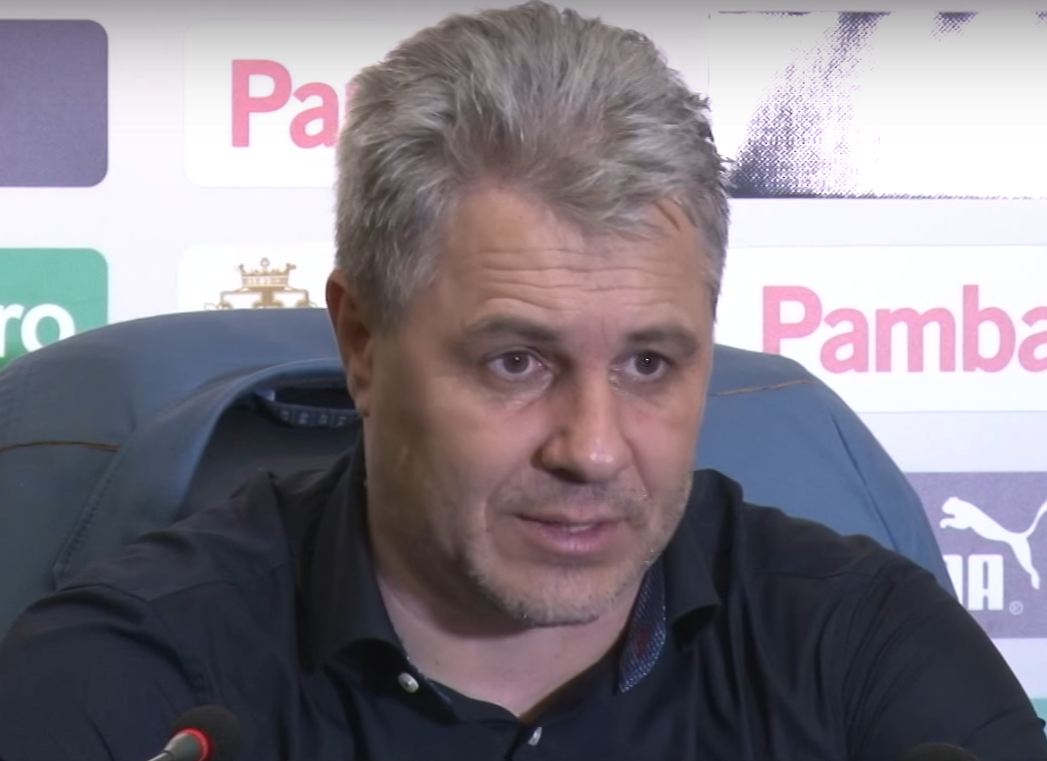
Marius Șumudică, the second-last manager of the original club.

In the summer of 2007, after relegation, FC Național was renamed again as Progresul București. The general manager became Cristian Munteanu; Corneliu Papură was appointed as the new manager; and Basarab Panduru appointed technical director. After struggles from the technical bench brought the team to the red zone, Dennis Șerban, Basarab Panduru and then Marius Șumudică were successively named as managers, the last one saving the team from a relegation to Liga III.

The team was ranked second at the end of the first part of the 2008–09 season, under the command of Șumudică. However, the club was not scheduled for rounds 23 and 24; it was later declared bankrupt. In 2008, the club was evacuated from the Cotroceni Stadium because of its debts to the National Bank of Romania, owner of the complex and former owner of the club.

=== After the bankruptcy of FC Progresul (2009–present) ===
On 11 August 2009, AS Progresul București was founded and enrolled in the fourth tier of the Romanian football league system. Tudor Iacov, brother of Constantin Iacov, the last president of the former club, was named chairman. Supporters returned to the club, and AS Progresul București considered itself as the successor of SC FC Progresul SA, although, technically it was not a legally-recognised successor.

In the summer of 2014, due to financial difficulties and rising internal tensions, the club experienced a split. Supported financially by Gabriel Rădulescu, Andrei Erimia, coach of a youth squad, founded on 14 June 2014 a new club, AFC Progresul Spartac 1944 București. The new entity does not claim the record, logo or the succession of FC Progresul, but nonetheless uses some elements of the original brand (bleu and blue colors; the sycamore leaf). It also calls itself the "direct descendant of Progresul București", with an objective of "reviving the spirit of Progresul from Cotroceni". The name of the new club is a combination of names "Progresul" (the most used name of the old club), "Spartac" (name used by FC Progresul between 1950 and 1954) and "1944" (foundation year of the original entity). Despite complications, AS Progresul went on to win Liga IV, Bucharest Series, qualifying for the 2015–16 promotion play-off. It nonetheless lost 1–6 on aggregate against Arsenal Malu, who were the Giurgiu County champions.

In the summer of 2015, a second new entity CS Progresul 2005, split from AS Progresul. Nonetheless, the majority of fans pledged their support to the Progresul Spartac faction. Despite the tough situation, AS Progresul made another good season and qualified for the Bucharest series promotion play-off, where it played against Progresul Spartac. In committees and through the press, both clubs accused each other of irregularities on the ground. At the end of the play-off, AS Progresul was ranked second. Progresul Spartac won and qualified for the Liga III promotion play-off, where after a spectacular 6–5 on aggregate against Voința Crevedia, it promoted to Liga III.

In the summer of 2017, due to the lack of funding and of a proper stadium, the double split, conflicts with the leadership of the Bucharest Football Association, and its abandonment by its former fans, AS Progresul withdrew from Liga IV and was dissolved. Progresul Spartac București is currently playing in Liga III, while CS Progresul 2005 is in the 4th tier.

== Grounds ==
=== Stadionul Dr. Staicovici ===
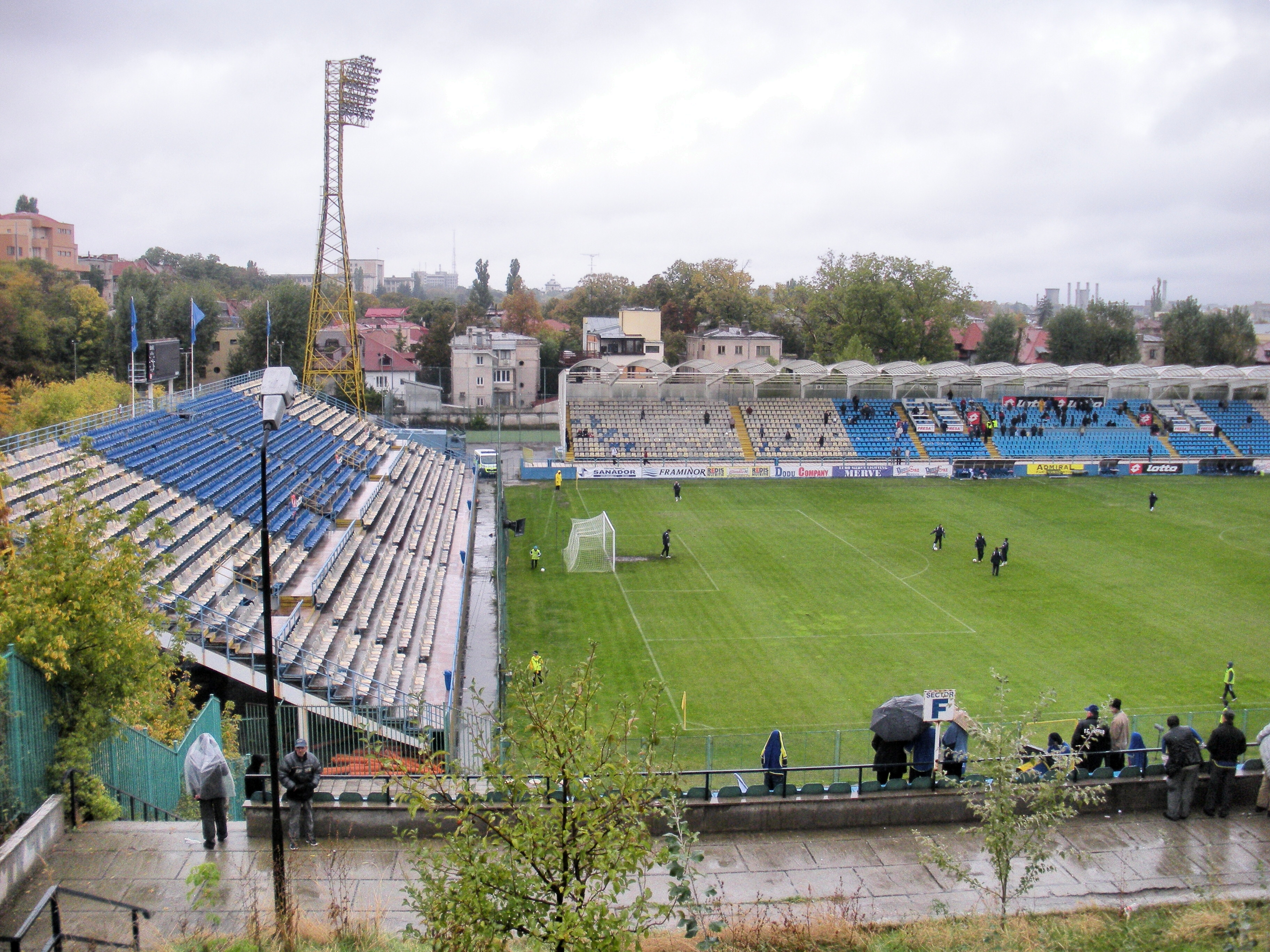
Main Stand and South End of the Cotroceni Stadium.

Founded on 10 May 1944 at Rășinari, and where the National Bank of Romania moved its headquarters to during the World War II, Progresul started to play in Bucharest after the end of the war. Dr. Staicovici Stadium, with a capacity of 8,000 seats, situated on the street with the same name, and in the center of the capital, became the home ground of the barbers for more than 40 years, when it was closed and decommissioned in September 1986.

=== Stadionul Cotroceni ===
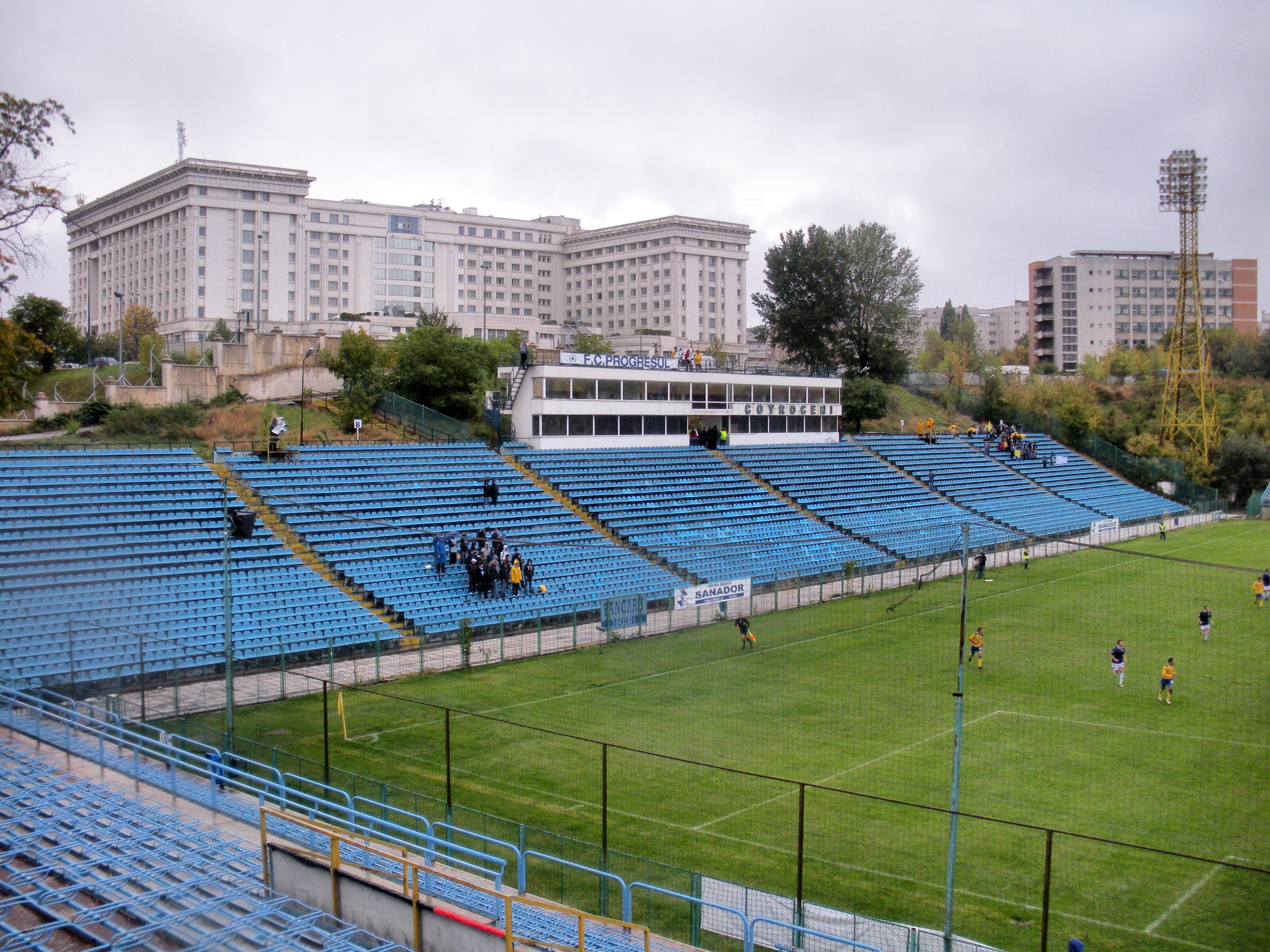
Second Stand of the Cotroceni Stadium.

In 1995, after almost 10 years without a constant home stadium, Progresul returned home to the newly built Cotroceni Stadium. The first stadium built after the Romanian Revolution of 1989, it was regarded as a jewel for its time, with a capacity of 14,542 seats, covered stands, electronic scoreboards, and modern floodlights. Next to the stadium was a gym, hotel, and tennis complex. The stadium is located in the same zone as the old Dr. Staicovici Stadium, in the downtown of the city in the Sycamore Park (Parcul cu Platani), close to the Palace of the Parliament, Ministry of National Defence and Arenele BNR. In early 2009, Progresul was evacuated from the Cotroceni Stadium because of its debts. For the last decade, the stadium has only seen use for a few championships of oină.

=== Others ===
Progresul spent almost 10 years in exile, the first period being between 1986 and 1995. Their home ground comprised various stadiums in Bucharest, among them: Autobuzul, Giulești, ICSIM, Mecanica Fină, Metalul, 23 August or Voința. The second period started in 2009 after the bankruptcy of SC FC Progresul SA. AS FC Progresul was forced for years to play at stadiums of varying, often poor, quality. Some of the football grounds used in the 2010s were Coresi, Viitorul, Granitul and Prefabricate. In 2015, Progresul Spartac bought and renovated Prefabricate Stadium, renaming it to the Progresul Spartac Stadium.

== Support ==
Progresul was from the beginning a team with an anti-communist fragrance, which led to the sympathy of supporters who did not wish to associate themselves with the Red Army or KGB. A big part of early supporters were actors, artists and bourgeoisie. Despite the fact that it was repeatedly relegated, the love of supporters remained constant in the 20th century. The home games of the 1970s and 1980s saw at least 6–7,000 people in the stands.

The year 1986 is regarded by some as the moment when a part of Progresul's spirit died. That year, Dr. Staicovici Stadium hosted Victoria București matches. Securitate's team fell in love with the arena, so much that they thought considered buying it. Former player, Dumitru Bolborea remembered: "No one expected that. They came with a trailer, some of them were cutting the stands with the welding machines and others were carrying them." Following their separation from their home stadium, the club played at the Voința Stadium, IMGB, ICSIM or Automatica, suffering weakened performance and being relegated to the third tier. At the beginning of their hardship, loyalty remained constant, with Progresul bringing in 5–6,000 spectators at Divizia C matches. Over time, the number of supporters decreased, the years of exile leaving deep traces. Valentin Caltuț later recounted, "Think about having to play nine years away. How do you make a kid stay with this team?". After 1995, supporters were few, mostly those nostalgic at old victories. Still, in 2003, a new active group came at the initiative of younger fans a group named "F.A.N.S".

Progresul supporters consider FC Argeș Pitești supporters to be their allies, with fans of both teams supporting the other during matches.

== Honours ==
=== Domestic ===
==== Leagues ====
- Divizia A / Liga I
  - Runners-up (3): 1995–96, 1996–97, 2001–02
- Liga II
  - Winners (6): 1954, 1965–66, 1969–70, 1975–76, 1979–80, 1991–92
  - Runners-up (5): 1953, 1971–72, 1974–75, 1985–86, 1986–87
- Liga III
  - Winners (2): 1946–47, 1989–90
  - Runners-up (1): 1988–89
- Liga IV – Bucharest (Regional)
  - Winners (1): 2015–16

==== Cups ====
- Cupa României
  - Winners (1): 1959–60
  - Runners-up (4): 1957–58, 1996–97, 2002–03, 2005–06

=== International ===
- UEFA Cup / Europa League
  - Second round (2): 1996–97, 2002–03
- UEFA Intertoto Cup
  - Third round (1): 1998

=== Other performances ===
- Appearances in Liga I: 32
- Best finish in Liga I: 2nd place in 1995–96, 1996–97 and 2001–02.
- Place 15 of 101 teams in Liga I All-time table

== European record ==
Progresul represented Romania in several UEFA competitions, including the UEFA Cup, UEFA Cup Winners' Cup, and UEFA Intertoto Cup. The club's most notable campaigns occurred in the late 1990s and early 2000s, featuring matches against prominent teams such as FK Partizan, Club Brugge, and Celta de Vigo, as well as eliminating SC Heerenveen on away goals to reach the second round of the 2002–03 UEFA Cup.

=== Statistics by competition ===
Competition	S	P	W	D	L	GF	GA	GD
UEFA Cup Winners' Cup / European Cup Winners' Cup	1	4	2	0	2	12	5	+7
UEFA Europa League / UEFA Cup	2	12	4	4	4	10	10	0
UEFA Intertoto Cup	1	6	4	0	2	12	8	+4
Total	4	22	10	4	8	34	23	+11

=== UEFA Cup Winners' Cup / European Cup Winners' Cup ===
Season	Round	Country	Club	Home	Away	Aggregate
1961–62	First round	Portugal	Leixões	1–1	0–1	1–2
1997–98	Qualifying round	Wales	Cwmbran Town	7–0	5–2	12–2
1997–98	First round	Turkey	Kocaelispor	0–1	0–2	0–3

=== UEFA Europa League / UEFA Cup ===
Season	Round	Country	Club	Home	Away	Aggregate
1996–97	Qualifying round	Serbia and Montenegro	Partizan	1–0	0–0	1–0
1996–97	First round	Ukraine	Chornomorets Odesa	2–0	0–0	2–0
1996–97	Second round	Belgium	Club Brugge	1–1	0–2	1–3
2002–03	Qualifying round	Albania	Tirana	2–2	1–0	3–2
2002–03	First round	Netherlands	Heerenveen	3–0	0–2	3–2
2002–03	Second round	France	Paris Saint-Germain	0–2	0–1	0–3

=== UEFA Intertoto Cup ===
Season	Round	Country	Club	Home	Away	Aggregate
1998	First round	Israel	Hapoel Haifa	3–1	2–1	5–2
1998	Second round	Greece	Iraklis	3–0	1–3	4–3
1998	Third round	Italy	Bologna	3–1	0–2	3–3 (a)

== Notable former players ==
The footballers enlisted below have had international cap(s) for their respective countries at junior and/or senior level and/or more than 100 caps for FC Progresul București.

Romania

- (Romania) Cristian Albeanu
- (Romania) Florea Birtașu
- (Romania) Aurel Beldeanu
- (Romania) Stelian Carabaș
- (Romania) Gabriel Caramarin
- (Romania) Florin Cârstea
- (Romania) Liviu Ciobotariu
- (Romania) Daniel Ciucă
- (Romania) Marius Ciugarin
- (Romania) Gigel Coman
- (Romania) Tudorel Cristea
- (Romania) Tiberiu Curt
- (Romania) Constantin Dinulescu
- (Romania) Marin Dragnea
- (Romania) Florentin Dumitru
- (Romania) Marin Dună
- (Romania) Adrian Falub
- (Romania) Constantin Gâlcă
- (Romania) Dudu Georgescu
- (Romania) Nicolae Georgescu
- (Romania) Daniel Ghindeanu
- (Romania) Ilie Greavu
- (Romania) Ovidiu Hanganu
- (Romania) Ovidiu Herea
- (Romania) Sabin Ilie
- (Romania) Gino Iorgulescu

Romania

- (Romania) Alexandru Karikaș
- (Romania) Marius Lăcătuș
- (Romania) Erik Lincar
- (Romania) Cătălin Liță
- (Romania) Ioan Lupaș
- (Romania) Ionuț Luțu
- (Romania) Petre Marin
- (Romania) Petre Mândru
- (Romania) Constantin Marinescu
- (Romania) Ion Mateescu
- (Romania) Adrian Matei
- (Romania) Viorel Mateianu
- (Romania) Vasile Mihăilescu
- (Romania) Cornel Mirea
- (Romania) Dănuț Moisescu
- (Romania) Flavius Moldovan
- (Romania) Petre Moldoveanu
- (Romania) Cristian Munteanu
- (Romania) Viorel Năstase
- (Romania) Cătălin Necula
- (Romania) Radu Niculescu
- (Romania) Nicolae Oaidă
- (Romania) Adrian Olah
- (Romania) Titus Ozon
- (Romania) Mihai Panc

Romania

- (Romania) Cornel Pavlovici
- (Romania) Ovidiu Petre
- (Romania) Marius Popa
- (Romania) Mircea Popa
- (Romania) Dumitru Popescu
- (Romania) Gabriel Popescu
- (Romania) Dan Potocianu
- (Romania) Daniel Prodan
- (Romania) Ionuț Rada
- (Romania) Sergiu Radu
- (Romania) Narcis Răducan
- (Romania) Gabriel Raksi
- (Romania) Gabriel Sandu
- (Romania) Mircea Sandu
- (Romania) Cristian Săpunaru
- (Romania) Lajos Sătmăreanu
- (Romania) Marian Savu
- (Romania) Ion Sburlea
- (Romania) Valeriu Soare
- (Romania) Ion Țîrcovnicu
- (Romania) Dan Topolinschi
- (Romania) Bogdan Vintilă
- (Romania) Marin Voinea
- (Romania) Constantin Zamfir
- (Romania) Dorin Zotincă

Albania

- (Albania) Albert Duro

Australia

- (Australia) Ryan Griffiths
- (Australia) Jonathan McKain
- (Australia) Wayne Srhoj
- (Australia) Michael Thwaite

Bosnia and Herzegovina

- (Bosnia and Herzegovina) Slaviša Mitrović

Moldova

- (Moldova) Valeriu Andronic

Nigeria

- (Nigeria) Abiodun Agunbiade

Belgium

- (Belgium) Egon Wisniowski

== Notable former managers ==
- (Romania) Vasile Gain (1945–1948)
- (Romania) Ioan Lupaș (1955)
- (Romania) Ioan Lupaș (1957–1959)
- (Romania) Augustin Botescu (1959–1960)
- (Romania) Cornel Drăgușin (1960)
- (Romania) Ioan Lupaș (1960–1961)
- (Romania) Cornel Drăgușin (1963–1964)
- (Romania) Titus Ozon (1964–1966)
- (Romania) Cornel Drăgușin (1968)
- (Romania) Victor Stănculescu (1970)
- (Romania) Petre Moldoveanu (1971)
- (Romania) Viorel Mateianu (1973–1976)
- (Romania) Nicolae Oaidă (1977–1978)
- (Romania) Eugen Iordache (1980)
- (Romania) Petre Moldoveanu (1980–1981)
- (Romania) Viorel Mateianu (1981)
- (Romania) Robert Cosmoc (1981–1982)
- (Romania) Constantin Ștefan (1982–1983)
- (Romania) Petre Gavrilă (1983–1984)
- (Romania) Nicolae Lupescu (1988)
- (Romania) Vasile Simionaș (1991–1992)
- (Romania) Nicolae Dumitru (1993)
- (Romania) Ion V. Ionescu (1993–1994)
- (Romania) Ion Dumitru (1994–1995)
- (Romania) Viorel Hizo (1995)
- (Romania) Marian Bondrea (1995)
- (Romania) Florin Halagian (1995–1997)
- (Romania) Florin Marin (1997–1998)
- (Spain) José Ramón Alexanko (1998–1999)
- (Romania) Gino Iorgulescu (1999) (caretaker)
- (Romania) Mihai Stoichiță (1999–2000)
- (Romania) Cosmin Olăroiu (2001–2002)
- (Italy) Walter Zenga (2002–2003)
- (Romania) Cosmin Olăroiu (2003–2004)
- (Italy) Roberto Landi (2005)
- (Italy) Cristiano Bergodi (2005–2006)
- (Romania) Ion Vlădoiu (2006)
- (Romania) Marin Dună (2006)
- (Romania) Liviu Ciobotariu (2006) (caretaker)
- (Romania) Sorin Cârțu (2006–2007)
- (Romania) Dennis Șerban (2007)
- (Romania) Corneliu Papură (2007)
- (Romania) Romulus Chihaia (2007) (caretaker)
- (Romania) Basarab Panduru (2007–2008)
- (Romania) Marius Șumudică (2008)
- (Romania) Gheorghe Mulțescu (2009)
- (Romania) Gheorghe Cristoloveanu
- (Romania) Gabriel Rădulescu

== League history ==
Season	Tier	Division	Place	Notes
2008–09	2	Liga II (Series I)	16th (D, R)	Excluded; dissolved
2007–08	2	Liga II (Series I)	11th	
2006–07	1	Liga I	16th (R)	Relegated
2005–06	1	Divizia A	6th	
2004–05	1	Divizia A	4th	
2003–04	1	Divizia A	7th	
2002–03	1	Divizia A	8th	
2001–02	1	Divizia A	2nd	
2000–01	1	Divizia A	7th	
1999–00	1	Divizia A	9th	
1998–99	1	Divizia A	7th	
1997–98	1	Divizia A	5th	
1996–97	1	Divizia A	2nd	
1995–96	1	Divizia A	2nd	
1994–95	1	Divizia A	6th	FC Național
1993–94	1	Divizia A	9th	
1992–93	1	Divizia A	15th	
1991–92	2	Divizia B (Series I)	1st (C, P)	Promoted
1990–91	2	Divizia B (Series II)	14th	
1989–90	3	Divizia C (Series V)	1st (C, P)	Promoted
1988–89	3	Divizia C (Series VI)	2nd	
1987–88	2	Divizia B (Series II)	18th (R)	Relegated
1986–87	2	Divizia B (Series II)	2nd	
1985–86	2	Divizia B (Series II)	2nd	
1984–85	2	Divizia B (Series II)	3rd	
1983–84	2	Divizia B (Series II)	10th	
1982–83	2	Divizia B (Series II)	10th	
1981–82	1	Divizia A	18th (R)	Relegated
1980–81	1	Divizia A	15th	
1979–80	2	Divizia B (Series II)	1st (C, P)	Promoted
1978–79	2	Divizia B (Series II)	8th	
1977–78	2	Divizia B (Series II)	6th	
1976–77	1	Divizia A	17th (R)	Relegated
1975–76	2	Divizia B (Series II)	1st (C, P)	Promoted
1974–75	2	Divizia B (Series II)	2nd	
1973–74	2	Divizia B (Series II)	7th	
1972–73	2	Divizia B (Series I)	7th	
1971–72	2	Divizia B (Series I)	2nd	
1970–71	1	Divizia A	15th (R)	Relegated
1969–70	2	Divizia B (Series I)	1st (C, P)	Promoted
1968–69	1	Divizia A	15th (R)	Relegated
1967–68	1	Divizia A	13th	Won play-off
1966–67	1	Divizia A	10th	
1965–66	2	Divizia B (Series I)	1st (C, P)	Promoted
1964–65	1	Divizia A	14th (R)	Relegated
1963–64	1	Divizia A	4th	
1962–63	1	Divizia A	9th	
1961–62	1	Divizia A	3rd	
1960–61	1	Divizia A	9th	
1959–60	1	Divizia A	9th	
1958–59	1	Divizia A	6th	
1957–58	1	Divizia A	4th	
1957	—	Cupa Primăverii (Group I)	4th	Unofficial
1956	1	Divizia A	9th	
1955	1	Divizia A	3rd	
1954	2	Divizia B (Series I)	1st (C, P)	Promoted
1953	2	Divizia B (Series I)	2nd	
1952	2	Divizia B (Series I)	3rd	
1951	2	Divizia B (Series I)	7th	Entered Divizia B
1950	3	Bucharest District Championship	—	Lost promotion play-off
1948–49	3	Divizia C (Series III)	5th	League dissolved
1947–48	2	Divizia B (Series I)	8th (R)	Relegated
1946–47	3	Divizia C (Series II)	1st (C, P)	Promoted
1945–46	Regional	Bucharest District Championship	1st (C, P)	Promoted
1944–45	—	—	—	Founded; friendlies

Champions or promoted
Runners-up
Third place
Relegated
