= 1959–60 Cupa României =

Tournament details
- Country: Romania

Final positions
- Champions: Progresul București
- Runners-up: Dinamo Obor București

The 1959–60 Cupa României was the 22nd edition of Romania's most prestigious football cup competition.

The title was won by Progresul București against Dinamo Obor București.

== Format ==
The competition is an annual knockout tournament.

In the first round proper, two pots were made, first pot with Divizia A teams and other teams till 16 and the second pot with the rest of teams qualified in this phase. Each tie is played as a single leg.

It is the third season in the history of Cupa României when all the games are played on a neutral location.

If a match is drawn after 90 minutes, the game goes in extra time, and if the scored is still tight after 120 minutes, then a replay will be played. In case the game is still tight after the replay, then the team from lower division will qualify for the next round.

From the first edition, the teams from Divizia A entered in competition in sixteen finals, rule which remained till today.

== First round proper ==
Team 1	Score	Team 2
29 November 1959
Ştiinţa Timişoara (Div. B)	3–1	(Div. A) Jiul Petroșani
Petrolul Ploiești (Div. A)	2–0	(Div. B) CFR Paşcani
Dinamo Obor București (Div. B)	3–2	(Div. C) Voinţa Târgu Mureş
Dinamo Galaţi (Div. B)	1–3	(Div. A) Rapid București
Prahova Ploiești (Div. B)	2–0	(Div. A) Farul Constanța
Metalul Titanii București (Div. B)	8–1	(Div. C) Dinamo Tecuci
ASA Sibiu (Div. B)	2–1	(Div. A) UTA Arad
Dinamo Bacău (Div. A)	4–1	(Div. B) Rulmentul Bârlad
Ştiinţa Cluj (Div. A)	3–1	(Div. B) CFR Arad
Progresul București (Div. A)	4–0	(Div. B) CS Craiova
Dinamo București (Div. A)	4–3	(Div. B) Metalul Târgovişte
Minerul Lupeni (Div. A)	2–1	(Div. B) CFR Cluj
CCA București (Div. A)	5–0	(Div. B) Poiana Câmpina
Steagul Roşu Oraşul Stalin (Div. A)	2–1	(Div. C) Rapid Cluj
Parângul Lonea (Div. C)	1–0	(Div. C) Olimpia Reşiţa
Stăruinţa Sighetu Marmației (Div. C)	2–0	(Div. C) CSM Rădăuţi

== Second round proper ==
Team 1	Score	Team 2
6 December 1959
Ştiinţa Cluj	4–1	ASA Sibiu
Ştiinţa Timişoara	5–1	Petrolul Ploiești
Dinamo Bacău	3–0	Stăruinţa Sighetu Marmației
CCA București	8–0	Metalul Titanii București
Dinamo Obor București	1–0	Rapid București
Minerul Lupeni	3–2	Parângul Lonea
Progresul București	4–0	Steagul Roşu Oraşul Stalin
Dinamo București	3–1	Prahova Ploiești

== Quarter-finals ==
Team 1	Score	Team 2
15 June 1960
Dinamo Obor București	3–1	Minerul Lupeni
Dinamo Bacău	3–2	Ştiinţa Cluj
Ştiinţa Timişoara	1–0	Dinamo București
22 June 1960
Progresul București	3–1	CCA București

== Semi-finals ==
Team 1	Score	Team 2
26 June 1960
Progresul București	2–0 (a.e.t.)	Dinamo Bacău
Dinamo Obor București	4–2 (a.e.t.)	Ştiinţa Timişoara

== Final ==
3 July 1960
17:30 EET

Progresul București	2–0	Dinamo Obor București
Oaidă 10'; Soare 34'	Report

Republicii, Bucharest
Attendance: 25,000
Referee: Andrei Rădulescu (Bucharest)

Cupa României 1959–60 winners

1st title
