= Gheorghe Hagi =

Romanian footballer and manager (born 1965)

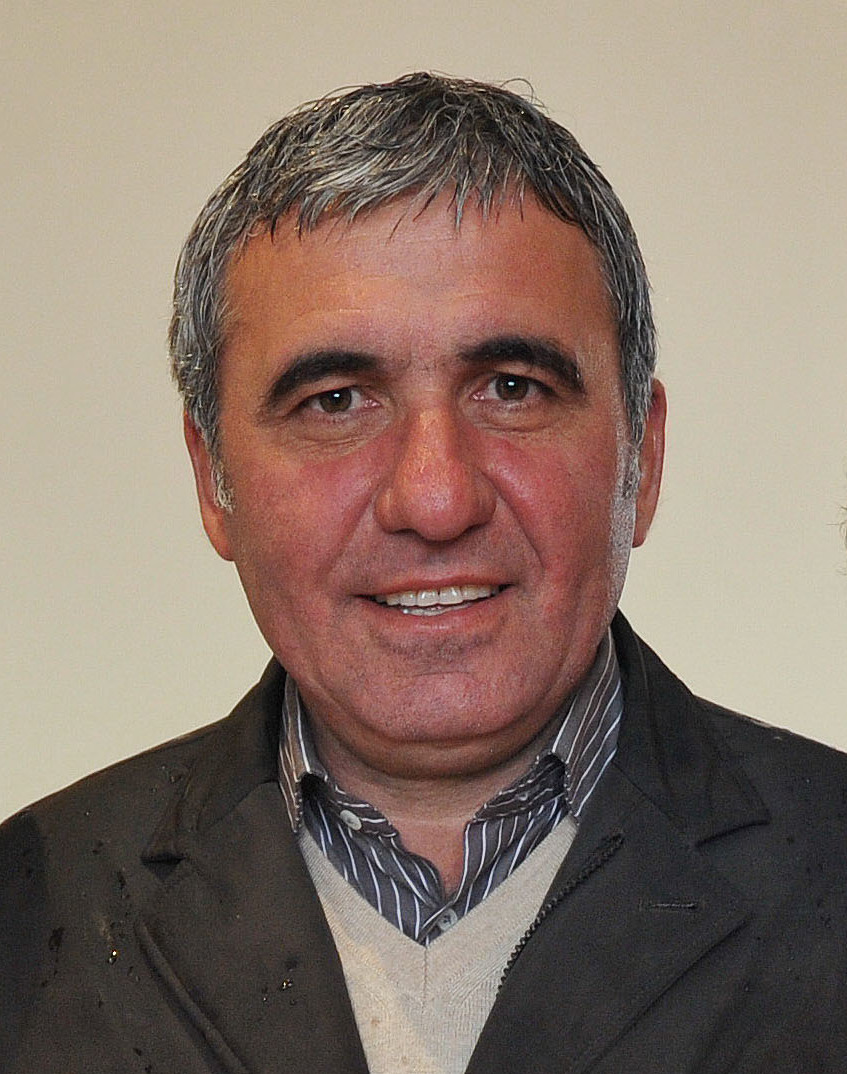
- Hagi in 2014

Personal information
- Full name: Gheorghe Hagi
- Date of birth: 5 February 1965 (age 61)
- Place of birth: Săcele, Romania
- Position: Attacking midfielder

Team information
- Current team: Romania (head coach)

Youth career
- 1975–1980: FC Constanța
- 1980–1982: Luceafărul București

Senior career*
Years	Team	Apps	(Gls)
1982–1983	FC Constanța	18	(7)
1983–1986	Sportul Studențesc	108	(58)
1986–1990	Steaua București	97	(76)
1990–1992	Real Madrid	64	(16)
1992–1994	Brescia	61	(14)
1994–1996	Barcelona	36	(7)
1996–2001	Galatasaray	132	(59)
Total		516	(237)

International career
1983–2000	Romania	124 (Note: 125 appearances according to some sources, although, as of 2007, the FRF no longer recognises Romania's unofficial 3–1 friendly away win against the Ecuador U23 side on 22 January 1984)	(35)

Managerial career
- 2001: Romania
- 2003: Bursaspor
- 2004–2005: Galatasaray
- 2005–2006: Politehnica Timișoara
- 2007: Steaua București
- 2010–2011: Galatasaray
- 2014–2020: Viitorul Constanța
- 2021–2025: Farul Constanța
- 2026–: Romania
- * Club domestic league appearances and goals

Gheorghe Hagi (Romanian pronunciation: [ˈɡe̯orɡe ˈhadʒʲ]; born 5 February 1965) is a Romanian football manager and former player, who is currently the head coach of the Romania national team. Deployed as an attacking midfielder, Hagi was considered one of the best players in the world during the 1980s and 1990s. Fans of Turkish club Galatasaray, with whom Hagi ended his career, called him Comandante ("[The] Commander"), while he was known as Regele ("The King") to Romanian supporters. Nicknamed "The Maradona of the Carpathians", he was a creative advanced playmaker renowned for his dribbling, technique, vision, passing and shooting.

After starting his playing career in Romania, with FC Constanța, and subsequently featuring for Sportul Studențesc and Steaua București, he later also had spells in Spain with Real Madrid and Barcelona, Italy with Brescia, and Turkey, with Galatasaray. Hagi is one of the few footballers to have played for both Spanish rival clubs Real Madrid and Barcelona. Throughout his club career, he won numerous titles while playing in four different countries: he won three Romanian League titles, two Cupa României titles, and the European Super Cup with Steaua București – also reaching the final of the 1988–89 European Cup –, a Supercopa de España title with Real Madrid, the Anglo-Italian Cup with Brescia, another Supercopa de España title with Barcelona, and four Süper Lig titles, two Turkish Cups, two Turkish Super Cups, the UEFA Cup, and the UEFA Super Cup with Galatasaray.

At international level, Hagi played for the Romania national team in three FIFA World Cups, in 1990, 1994 (where he was named in the World Cup All-Star Team after helping his nation to the quarter-finals of the tournament) and 1998; as well as in three UEFA European Championships, in 1984, 1996 and 2000. He won a total of 124 caps for Romania between 1983 and 2000, making him the second-most capped Romanian player of all time, behind only Dorinel Munteanu; he is also the joint all-time leading goalscorer of the Romania national side (alongside Adrian Mutu) with 35 goals.

Hagi is considered a hero both in his homeland and in Turkey. He was named Romanian Footballer of the Year a record seven times, and is regarded as one of the best football players of his generation. Hagi was nominated six times for the Ballon d'Or, his best performance being a 4th place in 1994. In November 2003, to celebrate UEFA's Jubilee, Hagi was selected as the Golden Player of Romania by the Romanian Football Federation as their most outstanding player of the past 50 years. In 2004, he was named by Pelé as one of the 125 Greatest Living Footballers at a FIFA Awards Ceremony. In 1999, he was ranked at number 25 in World Soccer Magazine's list of the 100 greatest players of the 20th century.

Following his retirement in 2001, Hagi pursued a managerial career, coaching the Romania national team, as well as clubs in both Romania and Turkey, namely Bursaspor, Galatasaray, Politehnica Timișoara, Steaua București, Viitorul Constanța and Farul Constanța. In 2009, he founded Romanian club Viitorul Constanța, which he has coached between 2014 and 2020. Hagi also established his namesake football academy, one of the largest in Southeastern Europe.

He is currently minority shareholder of Liga I club Farul Constanța.

== Early life ==
Hagi was born to Iancu and Chirata Hagi on 5 February 1965. Hagi's grandfather was one of 40,000 ethnic Aromanians who fled Greece to Romania. His mother was born in Mesolakkia, Greece, and her original surname was Mega. He set up home in the village of Săcele, near Constanța on the Black Sea coast. Hagi has fond memories of his grandfather who, like many Aromanians, was a shepherd. He stated: "I was proud when he, who was called Gheorghe like me, asked me to go and spend the whole day with him minding the sheep". He added: "I loved to eat cheese and tomatoes with him, and that is still my favorite food today." He also said "ambition is the main quality of the Aromanians".

== Club career ==
=== FC Constanța ===
"I knew he would soon be one of the best players in the world. He could do everything with the ball. To watch him was like watching a fairytale."

— Iosif Bükössy, Hagi's first coach

Hagi began his career in 1978, playing for FC Constanța's youth teams under the guidance of coach Iosif Bükössy. The Romanian Football Federation selected him to join the Luceafărul București squad in 1980, where he remained for two years. In 1982, he returned to FC Constanța, making his Divizia A debut on 11 September at age 17, being a starter under coach Emanoil Hașoti in a 3–0 away loss to SC Bacău. On 6 November he scored his first goal when he defeated goalkeeper Vasile Iordache with a 35-meter shot, closing the scoring in the 2–2 draw against Steaua București. In the Sportul newspaper, the chronicle of the match was signed by Stelian Trandafirescu, under the title "A junior (Hagi) stops the Bucharest team!" in which the journalist described the goal as follows:"Hagi scored sensationally (what an effective shot!), from distance". Until the end of the season he would score six more goals, including two doubles against CS Târgoviște and Politehnica Timișoara, but the team finished in last place, being relegated to Divizia B.

=== Sportul Studențesc ===
Hagi was originally directed to Universitatea Craiova, but chose Sportul Studențesc of Bucharest instead where he would form a successful offensive partnership with Marcel Coraș. The highlights of his years with Sportul were becoming the top-scorer of the league for two consecutive seasons, in the first one with 20 goals scored, then in the second with 31, including six in a 7–5 win over Olt Scornicești in the last round. In both instances he had a hard competition with Steaua's Victor Pițurcă, and those 31 goals netted in the 1985–86 season, helped the team finish runner-up in the league. During his time with The Students, Hagi started playing in European competitions, making 10 appearances with four goals scored in the UEFA Cup over the course of four seasons. Most notably he played in a historical 1–0 victory against Inter Milan in the first round of the 1984–85 season, then in the same round in the following edition he scored a hat-trick in a 4–4 draw against Neuchâtel Xamax, but on both occasions the team did not qualify further, losing on the aggregate result.

=== Steaua București ===
In late 1986, Hagi transferred to Steaua București as the team prepared for the European Super Cup final against Dynamo Kyiv. The original contract was for a one-game loan only, the final. However, after winning the final, in which Hagi scored the only goal of the match from a free kick, Steaua did not want to release him back to Sportul Studențesc and retained him. By the end of his first season he helped The Military Men win The Double, with coach Anghel Iordănescu giving him 14 league appearances in which he scored 10 goals, and also appeared the full 90 minutes in the 1–0 victory in the Cupa României final over rivals Dinamo București.

In the next season, Hagi was used by Iordănescu in 31 league games in which he scored 25 goals that helped the club win another title. Steaua also reached the semi-finals of the European Cup where they lost to Benfica, and Hagi contributed with two doubles scored against MTK Budapest and Omonia Nicosia in the eight matches played, being the competition's top-scorer alongside six other players.

In the 1988–89 season, the team won another Double, Hagi managing to score 31 goals in the 30 league matches he was played by Iordănescu, and also scored the only goal in another 1–0 victory in the Cupa României final over Dinamo. Furthermore, he played nine games in the European Cup campaign, including the full 90 minutes of the final in the 4–0 loss to AC Milan, while scoring six goals throughout the tournament, specifically three against Spartak Prague, two against Spartak Moscow and one in the semi-finals against Galatasaray. In December 1988 he netted five goals against Corvinul Hunedoara in an 11–0 win which is the biggest goal difference victory for Steaua in its first division history. In addition to his goal scored in the Cupa României final, he also scored four league goals in the derby against Dinamo that helped his side earn one victory and two draws. On 6 May 1990, Hagi made his last appearance for Steaua, a Divizia A match in which he scored once in the 4–0 success over Corvinul Hunedoara, totaling 223 matches with 141 goals in the competition.

His strong performances had him linked with Arrigo Sacchi's AC Milan, fellow Serie A club Juventus, and German side Bayern Munich, but Nicolae Ceaușescu's communist government rejected any offer.

=== Real Madrid ===
After impressing in the 1990 World Cup, Hagi was signed on 27 June that same year by Spanish club Real Madrid who paid a sum estimated by the press in between $3.5 – 4.3 million to Steaua to acquire him. He made his La Liga debut on 1 September, being used the entire match by coach John Toshack in a 1–0 home win over Castellón which was the club's 1000th victory in the competition. On 22 September he netted his first goal by closing the scoring in a 3–1 away victory against Real Zaragoza. During Hagi's first season, Toshack was replaced by Alfredo Di Stéfano, under whose command Hagi helped win the Supercopa de España by playing the final minutes of the 1–0 first-leg victory against rivals Barcelona, though an injury kept him out of the second leg.

In the following season under the guidance of Radomir Antić, Hagi scored more often. Most notably he managed a hat-trick in a 5–0 home win over Athletic Bilbao and a double in another victory against Osasuna, one of the goals being scored with a folha seca from the center of the field. In 2013, the Marca newspaper organized a poll for the most beautiful long-distance goal in Real Madrid's history and Hagi's folha seca against Osasuna came in first place. He also helped Los Blancos reach the 1991–92 UEFA Cup semi-finals, making 10 appearances in the campaign, scoring against FC Utrecht, Neuchâtel Xamax and in the lost semi-final to Torino. With one round before the end of the season, Real was in first place, needing a victory against Tenerife to win the title, but after leading 2–0 at halftime with one goal netted by Hagi, they ended up losing 3–2 and Barcelona won the championship. The team also lost the Copa del Rey final with 2–0 in a derby against Atlético Madrid in which coach Leo Beenhakker used Hagi as a starter.

=== Brescia ===
In 1992, Hagi was transferred for 8 billion lira ($2.4 million) by Mircea Lucescu's "Brescia Romena", as around that period, his fellow Romanians Florin Răducioiu, Ioan Sabău, Dorin Mateuț and Dănuț Lupu also played for the club. He made his Serie A debut on 5 September 1992 in a 0–0 draw against Napoli in which he received a red card, one month later scoring his first goal in a 4–1 home win over Foggia. At the end of his first season, the team was relegated to Serie B. After the relegation, Hagi was wanted by Napoli who needed a replacement for Diego Maradona but Brescia denied his transfer.

In his second season with Brescia, he helped them win the Anglo-Italian Cup, defeating Notts County 1–0 in the final at Wembley and also contributed to their third-place finish in Serie B and subsequent promotion back to Serie A.

=== Barcelona ===
After performing memorably during the 1994 World Cup, Hagi returned to Spain, signed by Barcelona from Brescia for $3.2 million, and was coached by his childhood idol Johan Cruyff. His first performance was winning the Supercopa de España against Real Zaragoza, where in the first leg, Hristo Stoichkov opened the score after a free kick executed by Hagi, which the goalkeeper defended. In the second leg, Hagi played the first 10 minutes, but was replaced after suffering an injury. He made his league debut for Barça on 16 September 1994 in a goalless draw in the derby against Espanyol, then in the following round he netted a double in a 4–0 win over Compostela. In December 1994 he scored a goal from the center of the field in an away victory against Celta Vigo which in 2007 was nominated by the Mundo Deportivo newspaper for the most beautiful goal in Barcelona's history.

In the following season he was teammates with compatriot Gheorghe Popescu. Hagi scored three goals in five matches in the 1995–96 UEFA Cup campaign against Hapoel Be'er Sheva, Sevilla and in the lost semi-final to Bayern Munich. Barcelona reached the 1996 Copa del Rey final where they lost 1–0 after extra time against Atlético Madrid in which Cruyff used Hagi the entire match.

=== Galatasaray ===
"Hagi is like wine, the older it gets, the better it is."

— Luis Fernández, former French international

In 1996, 31-year-old Hagi signed for Turkish club Galatasaray who paid $3.5 million to Barcelona for his transfer, during this spell reuniting with Popescu, and with Romanians Adrian Ilie and Iulian Filipescu also at the club. He had been the subject of a competing transfer offer from São Paulo. He made his Turkish league debut on 10 August under coach Fatih Terim, scoring a brace in a 4–0 win over Vanspor. Although in the twilight of his career, at Galatasaray, he was extremely successful and became highly popular among the Turkish supporters. In his first four seasons, he domestically won four league titles, two Turkish Cups and two Turkish Super Cups. His biggest success came at age 35, when he captained the club to win the 1999–2000 UEFA Cup, scoring two goals in the campaign against Borussia Dortmund and in the semi-finals against Leeds United. In the final, they defeated Arsenal on penalties following a 0–0 draw, however Hagi was sent off in extra time for punching Arsenal captain Tony Adams. Consequently, Galatasaray became the first Turkish club to win a UEFA club competition title.

In June 2000, Romanian Mircea Lucescu replaced Fatih Terim at the Cim Bom Bom side, together winning the 2000 UEFA Super Cup, after a 2–1 victory against Real Madrid. They also reached the quarter-finals of the Champions League during the 2000–01 season where in the first group stage, Hagi netted a goal with a spectacular long-distance shot in a win over AS Monaco. Subsequently, in the second group stage he scored his last goal in a European competition following a deep launch from Capone, then succeeding a lob over goalkeeper Dida in a 2–0 victory against AC Milan. In the quarter-finals they earned a 3–2 victory in the first leg against Real Madrid, but lost with 3–0 in the second one. In 2014, UEFA placed his goal against Monaco in a top 60 all-time best goals scored in European club and national teams competitions, while in 2020, the journalists of France Football ranked it in 19th place of most beautiful goals scored in the Champions League.

On 26 May 2001, Hagi played his last game as a professional footballer, managing to score a brace and provide an assist in Galatasaray's 4–0 win over Trabzonspor in the Turkish league. Hagi drew praise from the Galatasaray supporters for his performances during his time with the club, who adopted the chant "I Love You Hagi" in his honour.

== International career ==
=== Early years and Euro 1984 ===
Hagi made his debut for Romania on 10 August 1983 at the age of 18, under coach Mircea Lucescu who used him the entire match in a 0–0 friendly draw against Norway, played at the Ullevaal stadium in Oslo. After the game, the Sportul newspaper wrote:"Hagi is the main win of the match with Norway".

He was selected by Lucescu to be part of the squad that went to Euro 1984, as the team needed a replacement for injured Ilie Balaci. In the first game which was a 1–1 draw against Spain, he came in the 76th minute to replace Romulus Gabor, then in the 2–1 loss to West Germany he was a starter, but replaced at half-time with Ion Zare. In the 1–0 loss against Portugal he did not play, as Romania did not get past the group stage. The 19-year-old Hagi's performance in the final tournament was criticized by Lucescu:"Țicleanu and Hagi failed to make a real contribution after entering. Hagi, especially, isolated himself on the wing, being unable to make up for the great absence of Balaci".

He scored his first international goal against Northern Ireland in a 3–2 loss during the 1986 World Cup qualifiers. In the second leg against the Northern Irish he was made captain for the first time, but the game ended with another loss.

=== 1990 World Cup ===
He played six matches and scored once from a penalty in a 3–0 victory against Greece in the 1990 World Cup qualifiers. In the final tournament, coach Emerich Jenei could not use him in the first game, a victory against Soviet Union, as he was suspended due to a red card in the last qualifier match against Denmark. He played in the following two which were a loss to Cameroon and a draw against Argentina as Romania got past the group stage, reaching the round of 16. There, the journey ended in favor of Republic of Ireland at the penalty shoot-out following a 0–0 draw, with Hagi netting Romania's first spot kick.

=== 1994 World Cup ===
Hagi scored five goals in the 1994 World Cup qualifiers, including a brace in a 5–1 home win over Wales. In the last group game of the qualifiers, which was also against Wales, he opened the scoring, the first half ending 1–0. Then Hagi, feeling that his teammates were too relaxed, asked coach Anghel Iordănescu to leave the dressing room and let him talk to them, and afterwards he started punching the closet and held a motivational speech. The match finished with a 2–1 victory which earned Romania the mathematical qualification to the final tournament, and also this game is considered by Romanian journalists as the birth of Romania's "Golden Generation".

Hagi captained The Tricolours in the final tournament. In the first match against Colombia, he provided the assists for both of Florin Răducioiu's goals in the 3–1 win and defeated goalkeeper Óscar Córdoba with a spectacular 35-meter lob from the side of the field, with the ball not spinning in the air. After getting past the group stage, they eliminated Argentina with a 3–2 score in which Hagi gave an assist to one of Ilie Dumitrescu's goals, then scored himself after Dumitrescu returned the favor. In the quarter-finals, Romania faced Sweden, and after the score remained 2–2 following extra time, the match reached a penalty shoot-out where Hagi netted his shot, but because two of his teammates missed while all but one of the Swedes scored, the campaign ended.

Hagi was named in the Team of the Tournament for his performances. His goal against Colombia was listed in 2010 as one of the ten most beautiful goals scored in the World Cup by the Agence France-Presse news agency, and in 2014 Diario AS placed it in third place and L'Équipe in 16th.

=== Euro 1996 ===
During the successful Euro 1996 qualifiers he played six matches and scored two goals in two victories against Slovakia. In the final tournament, Iordănescu used him for the entirety of all three games in the group stage, but Romania lost all of them to France, Bulgaria and Spain.

=== 1998 World Cup ===
In the 1998 World Cup qualifiers he made six appearances, scoring three goals against Iceland, one against Liechtenstein, and a spectacular one in Dublin with a 35-meter free kick shot in a 1–1 draw against the Republic of Ireland. Hagi was used as captain by Iordănescu in all four games during the final tournament, as in the group stage they earned victories in the first two rounds over Colombia and England, thus mathematically being qualified before the last group match against Tunisia. In order to celebrate, the players dyed their hair blonde and presented themselves like that at the game. They were defeated with 1–0 by Croatia in the round of 16 after a goal scored from a penalty by Davor Šuker.

=== Euro 2000 ===
After the World Cup 1998, Hagi retired from the national team. Before a game against rivals Hungary in the Euro 2000 qualifiers, Hagi was invited by Adrian Păunescu to his "Meciul Meciurilor" (The Match of Matches) TV show. During the show, Păunescu and all his guests—figures from Romanian football and politics—tried for about five hours to convince Hagi to return to the national team. Additionally, over 100 fans spontaneously gathered in front of the TV station's headquarters to cheer him, even though it was past midnight. Seeing all of this happening, Hagi recalls saying to himself in those moments:"Who are you, for an entire country to beg for you?!" He played in the 2–0 victory against the Hungarians, having a praised evolution by the press even though coach Victor Pițurcă used him only in the first half because he injured his shoulder. At the end of the game he was carried on the arms of his colleagues to tour the stadium, although his shoulder was immobilized in a splint. In these qualifiers he would go on to score his last two goals for the national team in a win over Slovakia and a draw against Portugal.

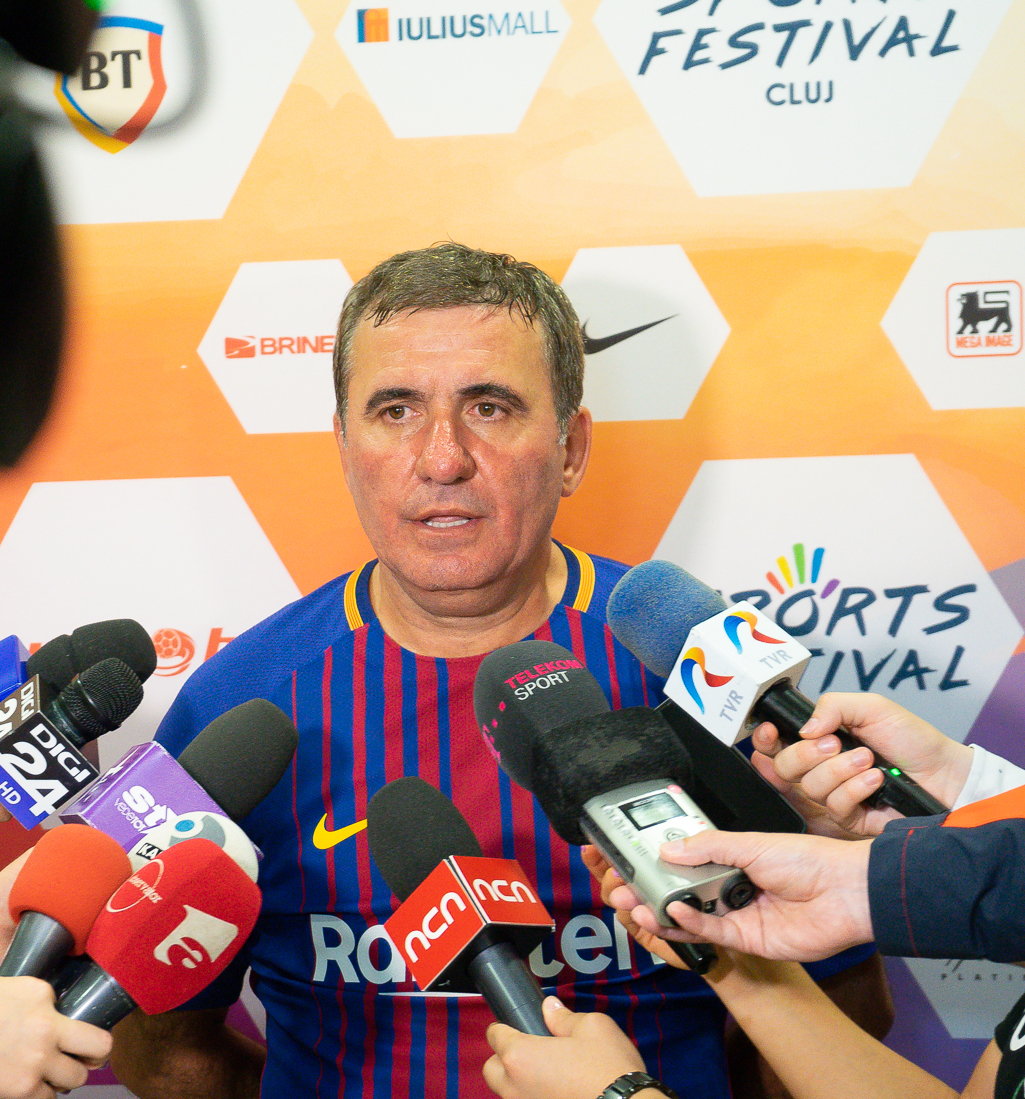
Hagi in 2018, being interviewed after playing for Barcelona Legends

During the final tournament, coach Emerich Jenei used him as a starter in the first two group stage matches. Hagi received a yellow card in each of them leading to his suspension for the decisive game against England. Eventually, his teammates managed to win it without him and qualify to the quarter-finals. There, they lost with 2–0 to eventual runners-up Italy in which Hagi received a red card in the 59th minute.

=== Retirement ===
Hagi retired from professional football in 2001 at the age of 36. That year, he was given a send-off in a testimonial game on 24 April, called "Gala Hagi", featuring a team of Romanian All-Stars against a team of international All-Stars. At the time of his retirement, his 124 caps for his country were a national record, which has since been surpassed by Dorinel Munteanu. He currently still holds the record of most goals scored for Romania, alongside Adrian Mutu, with 35.

For representing his country at six final tournaments, Hagi was decorated by President of Romania Traian Băsescu on 25 March 2008 with the Ordinul "Meritul Sportiv" – (The Medal "The Sportive Merit") class II. In 2022, the International Federation of Football History & Statistics (IFFHS) included Hagi in its "Romania's all-time dream team" first XI.

== Managerial career ==
=== Romania ===
In 2001, Hagi was named the head coach of Romania, replacing Ladislau Bölöni, who left the squad to coach Sporting Lisbon. He led the team in the final matches of the 2002 World Cup qualifiers, the first match being a 2–0 away win over Hungary, followed by a 1–1 draw against Georgia. Afterwards the team reached a play-off where they faced Slovenia, losing 2–1 in the first leg and drew 1–1 in the second where Hagi, by the end of the game, was using five forwards.

=== Bursaspor ===
In July 2003, Hagi took over as coach of Turkish Süper Lig side Bursaspor, transferring Romanian players Ionel Ganea, Bogdan Vintilă, Iulian Miu and Cornel Frăsineanu to the club. However, his spell was unsuccessful, earning just two victories out of 12 games, leaving in November.

=== Galatasaray ===
Hagi then became manager of Galatasaray in March 2004, replacing Fatih Terim, having fellow Romanian players Florin Bratu and Ovidiu Petre in the squad, finishing the season in sixth place. In the following season, the team finished third in the league and won the Turkish Cup after a 5–1 victory in the final against fierce rivals Fenerbahçe, and he also promoted young Arda Turan to the first team. Afterwards he was replaced with Eric Gerets.

=== Politehnica Timișoara ===
Hagi was hired by Politehnica Timișoara in November 2005, managing to win his first two matches, defeating Oțelul Galați 2–0 and Pandurii Târgu Jiu 1–0. During this spell, he gave the first league debut to Gabriel Torje. However, after a string of poor results and disagreements with the management, he left the club in May 2006 after a 2–0 loss to Oțelul. His decision to coach Politehnica Timișoara did not go well with Farul's fans, who asked for the name to be changed, as Constanța's main stadium used to bear his name since 2000.

=== Steaua București ===
From June to September 2007, Hagi coached Steaua București, managing to get past Zagłębie Lubin and BATE Borisov in the Champions League qualifying rounds, reaching the group stage where they were defeated 2–1 by Slavia Prague in the first match. After the defeat against Slavia he resigned due to a long series of conflicts with club owner Gigi Becali, who also happens to be his godson. The main reason for resigning was the owner's policy of imposing players, dictating the team's strategy and threatening him that he would be fired if he did not comply.

=== Return to Galatasaray ===
After Frank Rijkaard was sacked as coach, Hagi signed a one-and-a-half-year contract with Galatasaray on 21 October 2010. He brought to the team Bogdan Stancu, Emmanuel Culio and Róbinson Zapata from the Romanian league. Under his guidance, the team's results did not improve, so by the end of March 2011 his contract was terminated after a series of poor results.

=== Viitorul Constanța ===
In 2009, Hagi established a football academy in Constanța, which he named after himself, and also founded a senior football club, Viitorul Constanța, registering it in the third league and serving as its president. In a few years the team managed to promote to the first league, then in 2014 he installed himself as head coach. On 5 December 2014, he gave the senior debut to his son, Ianis. He had a good season in the 2015–16 edition, finishing in fifth place and qualifying to the Europa League, and also was named Romania Coach of the Year in 2015. In their first European match, Viitorul were defeated 5–0 by Gent at the Ghelamco Arena, and were eliminated from the Europa League third qualifying round round after a 0–0 draw in the second leg.

Viitorul won their first league title in the 2016–17 season after a 1–0 home victory over CFR Cluj in the last round, finishing on equal points with FCSB but on a better head-to-head record. As a result, Hagi won his second Romania Coach of the Year award. Hagi would go on to win two more trophies with Viitorul, first the 2018–19 Cupa României after a 2–1 victory against Astra Giurgiu in the final and shortly afterwards the 2019 Supercupa României when they defeated CFR Cluj with 1–0.

=== Farul Constanța ===
At a press conference from 21 June 2021, Hagi, together with club president Gheorghe Popescu and Farul Constanța's owner Ciprian Marica announced that Viitorul and Farul had merged into one team which would have the name of the latter and Hagi would be head coach.

Led by Hagi, Farul won their first league title in the 2022–23 season, earning the points that mathematically made them champions with one round before the end of the season, after a 3–2 win against FCSB, coming back from 0–2.

=== Return to Romania national team ===
On 20 April 2026, Hagi was appointed as head coach of the Romania national team for a second time, 25 years after his first tenure, signing a four-year contract.

== Style of play ==
A talented left-footed attacking midfielder, Hagi's playing style was frequently compared with Diego Maradona's throughout his career, due to his technical ability as well as his temperamental character and leadership; as a youth, he was mainly inspired by compatriots Anghel Iordănescu and Ion Dumitru. A quick, agile, creative, and mobile advanced playmaker, Hagi was also tactically versatile, and capable of playing in several midfield and offensive positions on either wing or through the middle, due to his ability with both feet, despite being naturally left-footed, although he had a preference for using his stronger foot; his preferred position was in a free role as a classic number 10, but he was also used as a second striker on occasion. Hagi was renowned in particular for his first touch and speed on the ball, as well as his timing, interpretation of space, bursts of acceleration and dribbling skills, which enabled him to get past defenders; he was also highly regarded for his vision and precise passing, although he was capable of both scoring and assisting goals, and was also an accurate finisher and set-piece taker, who had a penchant for scoring goals from powerful, bending long range strikes. Despite his small stature and slender build, Hagi possessed significant upper body strength, which, along with his control, aided him in protecting the ball from opponents, and allowed him to create space for himself or his teammates. Despite his skill and his reputation as one of the greatest number 10s of his generation, his career was marked by inconsistency at times, and he was also considered to be a controversial player, due to his rebellious and arrogant attitude, as well as his low work-rate, aggression, unsportsmanlike behaviour, and lack of discipline, which led him to have several disagreements and confrontations with his managers, opponents, and officials.

== Publications ==
On 5 February 2025, on the occasion of his 60th birthday, Hagi published his autobiography:

- Hagi - Drumul meu (Hagi - My road)

Several books about Hagi were written by various authors:

- Samba lui Romario și perinița lui Hagi (Romario's Samba and Hagi's Perinița) - written by George Mihalache (1994)
- Cu Hagi&Co de la Roma la New York (via Cardiff) (With Hagi&Co from Rome to New York (via Cardiff)) - written by Gheorghe Nicolaescu (1994)
- Hagi, magicianul (Hagi, the magician) - written by George Șeitan (1995)
- Hagi, stăpânul miracolelor (Hagi, the master of miracles) - written by Gheorghe Nicolaescu (1998)
- Hagi - written by Grigore Cartianu (2000 - first edition; 2000 - second edition; 2001 - third edition; 2014 - fourth edition)
- Hagi, unic într-un secol (Hagi, unique in a century) - written by Gheorghe Nicolaescu (2000 - first edition; 2001 - second edition)
- La răscruce de Hagi (At the crossroads of Hagi) - written by Mircea M. Ionescu (2005)
- Cei doi Hagi (The two Hagi) - written by Adrian Rachieru (2007)

== Personal life ==
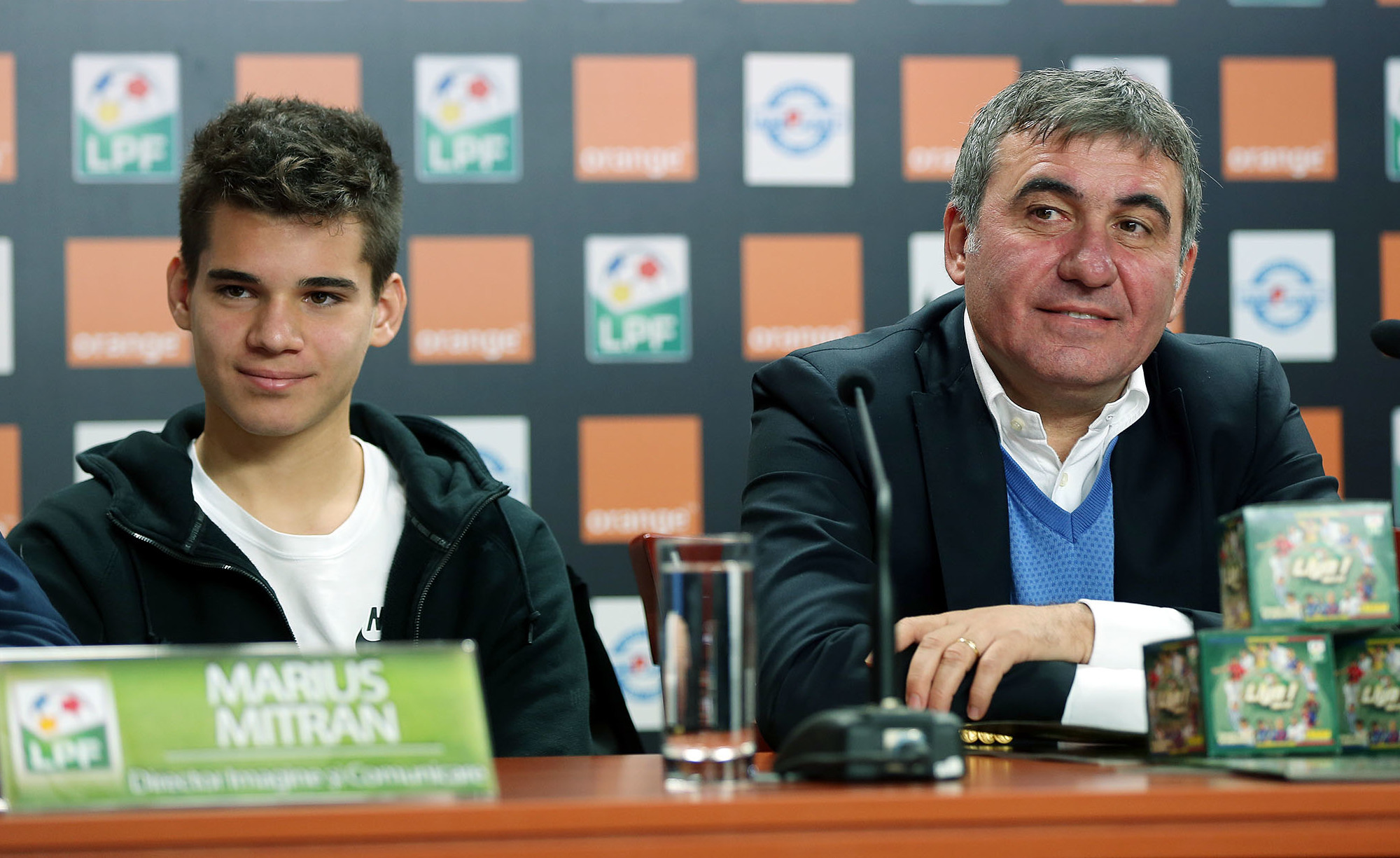
Hagi (right) with his son Ianis

Hagi is married to Marilena Hagi and has two children with her. His son, Ianis Hagi, is also a footballer. His daughter, Kira Hagi, is an actress. He is the brother-in-law of fellow Romanian international Gheorghe Popescu, who married Hagi's wife's sister.

In 1994, Hagi received the Honorary Citizen of Bucharest title. He was ranked 15th in the 2006 nationwide poll of the 100 Greatest Romanians. In 2013, he was Decorated at the Romanian Royal House with the "Nihil Sine Deo" medal by Margareta of Romania, Hagi saying at the event: "It's an important moment for me, I'm happy, I'm glad because all the sacrifices I've made in life were worth it, and right now I feel even more honored and responsible and I have more ambition to keep going, to keep working and giving my best for football, for children". On 12 March 2025, Hagi was decorated by President Ilie Bolojan with the Order of the Star of Romania in the rank of Knight, the highest distinction of the Romanian state.

Hagi was chosen to dub in Romanian the character Dagda in the animated movie Epic.

== Playing statistics ==
=== Club ===
Appearances and goals by club, season and competition
Club	Season	League			National cup (Note: Includes Cupa României, Copa del Rey, Coppa Italia, Turkish Cup)		Continental		Other		Total	
Club	Season	Division	Apps	Goals	Apps	Goals	Apps	Goals	Apps	Goals	Apps	Goals
FC Constanța	1982–83	Divizia A	18	7	0	0	—		—		18	7
Sportul Studențesc	1983–84	Divizia A	31	2	4	0	2 (Note: Appearances in UEFA Cup)	0	—		37	2
Sportul Studențesc	1984–85	Divizia A	30	20	2	1	2	0	—		34	21
Sportul Studențesc	1985–86	Divizia A	31	31	0	0	2	3	—		33	34
Sportul Studențesc	1986–87	Divizia A	16	5	1	0	4	1	—		21	6
Sportul Studențesc	Total		108	58	7	1	10	4	—		125	63
Steaua București	1986–87	Divizia A	14	10	4	1	1 (Note: Appearance in European Super Cup)	1	—		19	12
Steaua București	1987–88	Divizia A	31	25	4	2	8 (Note: Appearances in UEFA Champions League)	4	—		43	31
Steaua București	1988–89	Divizia A	30	31	3	1	9	6	—		42	38
Steaua București	1989–90	Divizia A	22	10	0	0	3	1	—		25	11
Steaua București	Total		97	76	11	4	21	12	—		129	92
Real Madrid	1990–91	La Liga	29	4	0	0	4	0	1 (Note: Appearance(s) in Supercopa)	0	34	4
Real Madrid	1991–92	La Liga	35	12	5	1	10	3	—		50	16
Real Madrid	Total		64	16	5	1	14	3	1	0	84	20
Brescia	1992–93	Serie A	31	5	2	1	—		—		33	6
Brescia	1993–94	Serie B	30	9	2	1	—		—		32	10
Brescia	Total		61	14	4	2	—		—		65	16
Barcelona	1994–95	La Liga	17	4	2	1	2	0	2	0	23	5
Barcelona	1995–96	La Liga	19	3	4	0	5	3	—		28	6
Barcelona	Total		36	7	6	1	7	3	2	0	51	11
Galatasaray	1996–97	1.Lig	30	14	1	0	3 (Note: Appearances in the UEFA Cup Winners' Cup)	1	2 (Note: Appearances in Presidential Cup)	0	36	15
Galatasaray	1997–98	1.Lig	30	8	6	0	6	1	0	0	42	9
Galatasaray	1998–99	1.Lig	28	14	4	1	8	3	—		40	18
Galatasaray	1999–2000	1.Lig	19	12	3	1	15 (Note: Seven appearances and two goals in UEFA Champions League, eight appearances with two goals in UEFA Cup)	4	—		37	17
Galatasaray	2000–01	1.Lig	25	11	1	0	11 (Note: Ten appearances and two goals in the UEFA Champions League, one appearance in the UEFA Super Cup)	2	—		37	13
Galatasaray	Total		132	59	15	2	43	11	2	0	192	72
Career total			516	237	48	11	95	33	5	0	664	281

=== International ===
Appearances and goals by national team and year
National team	Year	Apps	Goals
Romania	1983	5	0
Romania	1984	9	1
Romania	1985	10	4
Romania	1986	8	3
Romania	1987	8	2
Romania	1988	4	2
Romania	1989	8	0
Romania	1990	11	2
Romania	1991	6	2
Romania	1992	5	4
Romania	1993	5	1
Romania	1994	11	5
Romania	1995	3	1
Romania	1996	8	1
Romania	1997	6	4
Romania	1998	7	1
Romania	1999	4	2
Romania	2000	6	0
Total		124	35

Scores and results list Romania's goal tally first, score column indicates score after each Hagi goal.

List of international goals scored by Gheorghe Hagi
No.	Date	Venue	Opponent	Score	Result	Competition
1	12 September 1984	Windsor Park, Belfast, Northern Ireland	Northern Ireland	1–1	2–3	1986 FIFA World Cup qualification
2	30 January 1985	Estádio José Alvalade, Lisbon, Portugal	Portugal	3–2	3–2	Friendly
3	3 April 1985	Stadionul Central, Craiova, Romania	Turkey	1–0	3–0	1986 FIFA World Cup qualification
4	6 June 1985	Helsinki Olympic Stadium, Helsinki, Finland	Finland	1–0	1–1	1986 FIFA World Cup qualification
5	28 August 1985	Stadionul 1 Mai, Timișoara, Romania	Finland	1–0	2–0	1986 FIFA World Cup qualification
6	23 April 1986	Stadionul 1 Mai, Timișoara, Romania	Soviet Union	1–0	2–1	Friendly
7	20 August 1986	Ullevaal Stadion, Oslo, Norway	Norway	2–0	2–2	Friendly
8	10 September 1986	Stadionul Steaua, Bucharest, Romania	Austria	4–0	4–1	UEFA Euro 1988 qualifying
9	11 March 1987	Karaiskakis Stadium, Piraeus, Greece	Greece	1–1	1–1	Friendly
10	25 March 1987	Stadionul Steaua, Bucharest, Romania	Albania	3–1	5–1	UEFA Euro 1988 qualifying
11	20 September 1988	Stadionul 1 Mai, Constanța, Romania	Albania	2–0	3–0	Friendly
12	2 November 1988	Stadionul Steaua, Bucharest, Romania	Greece	2–0	3–0	1990 FIFA World Cup qualification
13	3 August 1990	Stadion Allmend, Lucerne, Switzerland	Switzerland	1–0	1–2	Friendly
14	25 April 1990	Kiryat Eliezer Stadium, Haifa, Israel	Israel	2–0	4–1	Friendly
15	27 March 1991	Stadio Olimpico, Serravalle, San Marino	San Marino	1–0	3–1	UEFA Euro 1992 qualifying
16	16 October 1991	Stadionul Steaua, Bucharest, Romania	Scotland	1–0	1–0	UEFA Euro 1992 qualifying
17	6 May 1992	Stadionul Steaua, Bucharest, Romania	Faroe Islands	2–0	7–0	FIFA World Cup 1994 qualification
18	20 May 1992	Stadionul Steaua, Bucharest, Romania	Wales	1–0	5–1	FIFA World Cup 1994 qualification
19	20 May 1992	Stadionul Steaua, Bucharest, Romania	Wales	5–1	5–1	FIFA World Cup 1994 qualification
20	29 November 1992	Neo GSZ Stadium, Larnaca, Cyprus	Cyprus	3–1	4–1	FIFA World Cup 1994 qualification
21	17 November 1993	Cardiff Arms Park, Cardiff, Wales	Wales	1–0	2–1	FIFA World Cup 1994 qualification
22	14 June 1994	Trabuco Hills Stadium, Mission Viejo, United States	Sweden	1–1	1–1	Friendly
23	18 June 1994	Rose Bowl, Pasadena, United States	Colombia	2–0	3–1	1994 FIFA World Cup
24	22 June 1994	Pontiac Silverdome, Pontiac, United States	Switzerland	1–1	1–4	1994 FIFA World Cup
25	3 July 1994	Rose Bowl, Pasadena, United States	Argentina	3–1	3–2	1994 FIFA World Cup
26	12 November 1994	Stadionul Steaua, Bucharest, Romania	Slovakia	2–0	3–2	UEFA Euro 1996 qualifying
27	15 October 1995	Všešportový areál, Košice, Slovakia	Slovakia	1–0	2–0	UEFA Euro 1996 qualifying
28	9 October 1996	Laugardalsvöllur, Reykjavík, Iceland	Iceland	2–0	4–0	1998 FIFA World Cup qualification
29	29 March 1997	Stadionul Steaua, Bucharest, Romania	Liechtenstein	4–0	8–0	1998 FIFA World Cup qualification
30	10 September 1997	Stadionul Steaua, Bucharest, Romania	Iceland	1–0	4–0	1998 FIFA World Cup qualification
31	10 September 1997	Stadionul Steaua, Bucharest, Romania	Iceland	4–0	4–0	1998 FIFA World Cup qualification
32	11 October 1997	Lansdowne Road, Dublin, Ireland	Republic of Ireland	1–0	1–1	1998 FIFA World Cup qualification
33	3 June 1998	Stadionul Steaua, Bucharest, Romania	Paraguay	3–2	3–2	Friendly
34	4 September 1999	Tehelné pole, Bratislava, Slovakia	Slovakia	2–1	5–1	UEFA Euro 2000 qualifying
35	8 September 1999	Stadionul Steaua, Bucharest, Romania	Portugal	1–0	1–1	UEFA Euro 2000 qualifying

== Managerial statistics ==
As of 17 November 2026

Team	From	To	Record				
Team	From	To	G	W	D	L	Win %
Romania	1 September 2001	27 November 2001	4	1	2	1	25.00
Bursaspor	1 July 2003	15 November 2003	12	2	4	6	16.67
Galatasaray	22 March 2004	28 May 2005	48	34	5	9	70.83
Politehnica Timișoara	7 November 2005	21 May 2006	17	5	4	8	29.41
Steaua București	1 July 2007	20 September 2007	11	6	3	2	54.55
Galatasaray	21 October 2010	24 March 2011	24	8	6	10	33.33
Viitorul Constanța	15 September 2014	1 August 2020	306	153	63	90	50.00
Farul Constanța	21 June 2021	2 June 2025	183	77	49	57	42.08
Romania	20 April 2026	Present	8	2	1	5	25.00
Total			613	288	137	188	46.98

== Honours ==
=== Player ===
Steaua București

- Divizia A: 1986–87, 1987–88, 1988–89
- Cupa României: 1986–87, 1988–89
- European Super Cup: 1986
- European Cup runners-up: 1988–89

Real Madrid

- Copa del Rey runner-up: 1991–92
- Supercopa de España: 1990

Brescia

- Anglo-Italian Cup: 1993–94

Barcelona

- Copa del Rey runner-up: 1995–96
- Supercopa de España: 1994

Galatasaray

- 1.Lig: 1996–97, 1997–98, 1998–99, 1999–2000
- Turkish Cup: 1998–99, 1999–2000
- Turkish Super Cup: 1996, 1997
- UEFA Cup: 1999–2000
- UEFA Super Cup: 2000

=== Individual ===
- Divizia A top scorer: 1984–85, 1985–86
- European Cup top scorer: 1987–88
- Gazeta Sporturilor Romanian Footballer of the Year: 1985, 1987, 1993, 1994, 1997, 1999, 2000
- ADN Eastern European Footballer of the Season: 1989
- FIFA World Cup All-Star Team: 1994
- Ballon d'Or: 4th place 1994
- World XI: 1998
- Turkish Footballer of the Year: 1996, 1999, 2000,
- World Soccer Magazine's 100 Greatest Players of the 20th century: 1999 (#25)
- UEFA Jubilee Awards – Greatest Romanian Footballer of the last 50 Years: 2003
- FIFA 100: 2004
- Golden Foot Legends Award: 2015

=== Manager ===
Galatasaray

- Turkish Cup: 2004–05

Viitorul Constanța

- Liga I: 2016–17
- Cupa României: 2018–19
- Supercupa României: 2019

Farul Constanta

- Liga I: 2022–23
- Supercupa României runner-up: 2023

=== Individual ===
- Romania Coach of the Year: 2015, 2017
- Liga I Manager of the Season: 2022–23

== See also ==
- List of top international men's football goalscorers by country
- The 100 Greatest Players of the 20th Century
- List of footballers with 100 or more caps
