= Vasile Mănăilă =

Romanian footballer

Personal information
- Date of birth: 22 November 1962
- Place of birth: Bordușani, Romania
- Date of death: 10 June 2025 (aged 62)
- Place of death: Constanța, Romania
- Height: 1.77 m (5 ft 10 in)
- Position: Defender

Youth career
- Farul Constanța

Senior career*
| Years | Team | Apps | (Gls) |
| 1981–1984 | Farul Constanța (Note: The statistics for the 1983–84 Divizia B season are unavailable.) | 44 | (1) |
| 1984–1991 | Universitatea Craiova | 189 | (20) |
| 1991–1995 | Farul Constanța | 66 | (3) |
| 1995–1997 | ARO Câmpulung | 29 | (1) |
| Total | | 299 | (24) |

International career
| 1982–1985 | Romania U21 | 13 | (0) |
| 1984–1990 | Romania B | 5 | (0) |
| 1991 | Romania | 1 | (0) |

Managerial career
- 1995–1997: ARO Câmpulung (assistant)
- 2009–2010: Farul Constanța (assistant)
- * Club domestic league appearances and goals

Vasile Mănăilă (22 November 1962 – 10 June 2025) was a Romanian football player and coach.

== Club career ==
Mănăilă, nicknamed "Marinarul" (The Sailor), was born on 22 November 1962 in Bordușani, Ialomița County, Romania, moving with his parents at age 7 to live in Constanța. He began playing football as a child at Farul Constanța's youth center, his first coach being Iosif Bükössy, then working more with Constantin Tâlvescu. He made his Divizia A debut on 26 September 1981 under coach Emanoil Hașoti, playing for Farul in a 3–0 away loss to UTA Arad. He played three seasons at Farul, including one in Divizia B.

In 1984 Mănăilă joined Universitatea Craiova, where his first performance was reaching the 1985 Cupa României final, with coach Florin Halagian using him the entire match in the 2–1 loss to Steaua București. He helped the club win The Double in the 1990–91 season under coach Sorin Cârțu, contributing with 30 league appearances and two goals scored, also playing the full 90 minutes in the 2–1 win over FC Bacău in the Cupa României final. Mănăilă represented Craiova in 19 matches in European competitions. By playing four matches in the 1984–85 UEFA Cup run, he helped "U" get past Olympiacos before they ultimately fell to Željezničar in the round of 16. Mănăilă also played in a 3–0 win over AS Monaco in the second leg of the first round of the 1985–86 European Cup Winners' Cup, after losing the first leg 2–0. However, they were eliminated in the following round by the eventual winners of the competition, Dynamo Kyiv.

After his spell at "U" Craiova ended, he returned to Farul Constanța for three and a half seasons, totaling 299 Divizia A appearances with 24 goals scored. Mănăilă ended his playing career by spending two seasons as a player and an assistant coach at Divizia B team ARO Câmpulung. Afterwards he worked as a junior-level coach at Farul Constanța and Viitorul Constanța, and was also an assistant coach of Ștefan Stoica at Farul's senior squad.

== International career ==
Between 1982 and 1990, Mănăilă made several appearances for Romania's under-21 and B squads.

He played a single match for Romania under coach Mircea Rădulescu on 28 August 1991 in a 2–0 friendly loss against USA.

== Death ==
Mănăilă died on 10 June 2025 at age 62 in Constanța, Romania.

== Honours ==
Universitatea Craiova

- Divizia A: 1990–91
- Cupa României: 1990–91, runner-up 1984–85
