= Hiannick Kamba =

German footballer (born 1986)

Hiannick Kamba (born 30 July 1986) is a German former footballer who last played as a defender for VfB Hüls.

== Early life ==
Kamba was born to Congolese parents who fled the country and settled in Essen, Germany. He often faced racial prejudice growing up.

== Playing career ==
As a youth player, Kamba joined the youth academy of German Bundesliga side Schalke, helping the club win the 2005 DFB-Pokal der Junioren. As a senior, he played for Schalke II, Germania Gladbeck, and Hüls.

== Post-playing career ==
Kamba worked as a chemical technician.
