= Mihai Stere =

Mihai Stere may refer to:

- Mihai Stere (footballer, born 1968), Romanian footballer
- Mihai Stere (footballer, born 1975), Romanian footballer
