= CS Portul Constanța =

Romanian football club

Portul Constanța
- Full name: Club Sportiv Portul Constanța
- Nicknames: Docherii (The Dockworkers); Portuarii (The Portworkers); Pirații (The Pirates)
- Short name: Portul
- Founded: 1930; 96 years ago as SPM Constanța; 1949; 77 years ago as SPT Constanța
- Ground: Portul
- Capacity: 10,000
- Owner: Port of Constanța
- Chairman: Eusebiu Gheorghe
- Head coach: Gabriel Șimu
- League: Liga III
- 2025–26: Liga IV, Constanța, 1st of 16 (promoted via play-offs)
Home colours	Away colours

Club Sportiv Portul Constanța, commonly known as Portul Constanța or simply Portul, is a Romanian football club based in Constanța, Constanța County and currently competes in Liga III, the third tier of Romanian football.

== History ==
The football team of the workers from Constanța Port was founded in 1930 under the name SPM Constanța (Serviciul Porturi Maritime, lit. 'Maritime Ports Service'), competing in the Constanța District Championship. After World War II, between 1945 and 1949, the club was known as PCA Constanța (Porturi Comunicații Ape, lit. 'Ports, Communications, Water'), during which time it achieved its first promotion to the second tier of Romanian football by winning Series IV of Divizia C in the 1946–47 season.

In 1949, PCA merged with Dezrobirea Constanța, resulting in Locomotiva PCA, which later became Farul Constanța. The football tradition of the port area was, however, continued under the name SPT Constanța (Sindicatul Porturi și Transport, lit. 'Ports and Transport Union'). From 1952, the team was taken over by the Constanța Naval Shipyard and was renamed Șantierul (lit. 'Shipyard') Constanța.

In the 1952 season, Șantierul earned promotion to Divizia B after winning the Constanța Regional Championship and succeeding in the promotion play-offs against Flacăra Târgoviște, Dinamo 8 București, and Dinamo Turnu Măgurele. In the following campaign, the Dockworkers finished 5th in Series I of Divizia B and reached the Round of 32 in the 1953 Cupa României, where they lost 1–2 to Dinamo București. Coached by Marki, the squad included Bartha, Leich, Constantinescu, Mincă, Seleș, Biro, Boriceanu, Asalos, Ivan Marin, Crăciun, Bondar, Zaharia, Stoichiță, Ianovici, Maior, Palfi, Manole, Schmidt, and Zinculescu.

Șantierul withdrew the following season and reorganized in the regional championship as Metalul Șantierul Naval Constanța. In the 1955 season, the team claimed the regional championship once again and was promoted to the newly founded Divizia C. Renamed Energia Metalul Constanța, it finished 10th in Series II in the 1956 season.

Renamed Șantierul Naval Constanța, further emphasizing its connection to the maritime and port industry, the team continued to compete in Series II, finishing 5th in the 1957–58 season. In 1958, the club adopted the name Șantierul Naval Maritim Constanța, finishing 2nd in Series II in the 1958–59 season and earning promotion to Divizia B, where it placed 6th in 1959–60 and 8th in 1960–61, both in Series I. SNM also had a good run in the 1960–61 Cupa României, eliminating first-division and fellow city side Farul Constanța before losing to third-division team Voința București 0–1 in the Round of 16.

In 1961, the club adopted the name Portul Constanța, finished last in Series II in the 1961–62 season, and was relegated to the regional championship. The Port Workers won the Dobrogea Regional Championship in 1962–63 and returned to the national level in the newly re-established Divizia C under coach Mihai Tudor, with a squad including Barta, Croitoru, Pocriste, Caraivan, Chirea, Abduraman, Memet, Chivu, Laurențiu, Șeitan, and Munteanu.

In Divizia C, Portul finished 11th in 1963–64, avoiding relegation due to an expansion of the number of teams. The team then placed runners-up in 1964–65 and 3rd in 1965–66. In the 1966–67 campaign, The Portworkers won the South Series and earned promotion to Divizia B under the guidance of Lucrețiu Florescu. The squad included Pițuru, Danciu, Melenco, Stoica, Hula, Nicoară, Stelea, Sântimbreanu, Moroianu, Butuc, Tănase, Strâmbeanu, Mănescu, Dan, Grosman, Buzea, Naum, Mitrenco, Caraman, Memet, Stâlpeanu, Carabaș, and Babu.

Portul then played five consecutive seasons in Series I of Divizia B, finishing 6th in 1967–68 coached by Lucrețiu Florescu, 7th in 1968–69 under Emanoil Hașoti, 4th in 1969–70 led by Hașoti in the first half of the campaign and Ion Troancă in the second, and finishing 9th in 1970–71 and last in 1971–72 under Constantin Tâlvescu.

In Divizia C, Portul was assigned to Series IV, finishing 5th in 1972–73, 3rd in 1973–74, and 11th in the 1974–75 season. Promotion was achieved again at the end of the 1975–76 campaign, when the team, coached by Vasile Luban, won the series. The squad included Cornățeanu, Dumitru, Cura, Cristu, Stan, Ivanov, Postică, Naum, Corendea, Caramalău, Bechir, Ciobanu, G. Gafar, Grigore, Bărbulescu, Enache, Cicu, Bratu, Biliboacă, Iordan, Mărculescu, Coman, and Cosma.

In Divizia B, Portul competed in Series I under Vasile Luban, finishing 13th in 1976–77, 8th in 1977–78, and 13th in 1978–79, narrowly avoiding relegation on goal difference. The following season, under Romeo Giovani, the team finished last and was relegated.

The 1980s were spent in Divizia C under Romeo Giovani, with several upper-table finishes. The team finished 2nd in 1980–81 and 1981–82, 3rd in 1982–83, 12th in 1983–84 in Series III, 4th in 1984–85, 3rd in 1985–86, 8th in 1986–87, 5th in 1987–88, 3rd in 1988–89, and 9th in 1989–90.

In the 1990–91 season, under the same Romeo Giovani, Portul was promoted again to Divizia B, with players including Dinică, Ghișan, Mangri, Gheorghiță, Toma, Lupu, Crăciun, Mirea, Arăpașu, Petcu, P. Biliboacă, Toșa, Onisemiuc, and Bagia.

Competing in Series I of the second division, Portul finished 11th in 1991–92 with Ion Constantinescu in charge from March after a short interim spell under Ștefan Petcu and Nicolae Ciobanu, 10th in 1992–93, and 12th in 1993–94 with Nicolae Leolea as head coach. In the 1994–95 season, Portul finished 13th and reached the Round of 32 of the Cupa României, where it lost 0–3 to Steaua București. The squad, coached by Vasile Mihu, included Dinică, Ghiță, T. Ștefan, Rădulescu, Puflene, Țăranu, Marin, M. Șerban, Feodor, Axinciuc, Cune, Neagu, Stelea, Stamate, Chirea, Dula, Lupu, Zadea, D. Șerban, Stere, Șimu, and Onisemiuc. The following season, Portul was relegated to Divizia C after finishing last in 1995–96.

In the following years, Portul Constanța competed in Divizia C, finishing 9th in Series II in the 1996–97 season and being relegated at the end of the 1997–98 season after finishing 17th. However, the Portworkers managed to quickly return to the third tier by winning the Divizia D Constanța County title and finished as runners-up in the 1999–2000 season in Series II of Divizia C.

Moved to Series III, Portul finished once again as runners-up in the 2000–01 season under Ion Constantinescu, then 11th in 2001–02, 5th in 2002–03, and 3rd in 2003–04. In the 2004–05 season, the team was transferred to Series II and managed to win the series, returning after nine years to the second division.

In Divizia B, Portul played in Series I, where it ranked 15th under Ion Constantinescu at the end of the 2005–06 season and was relegated. During the 2006–07 season of Liga III, the team was successively managed by Cristian Cămui, Constantin Funda, and Constantin Tîlvescu, finishing 4th in Series II. This was followed by two consecutive 10th-place finishes in the 2007–08 and 2008–09 seasons.

In 2009, Portul withdrew from Liga III due to financial problems and continued in Liga IV Constanța County, receiving limited financial support from the trade union of the National Company Constanța Maritime Ports Administration and the company itself, which covered the stadium’s utility costs. The Constanța County top division was structured into East and West series, followed by a championship play-off and play-out phase, with Portul competing in the East Series and regularly qualifying for the championship play-off. Gabriel Șimu served as head coach from 2009 to 2012, guiding the team to 3rd and 4th in 2009–10, 6th and 8th in 2010–11, and 3rd and 7th in 2011–12.

In the 2012–13 season, Doru Lupu took over as head coach during the campaign, when the team finished 4th in the East Series and 9th in the championship play-off. Portul continued with 3rd and 8th in 2013–14 and 5th and 11th in 2014–15.

From 2015, Liga IV Constanța County returned to a single-series format, with Doru Lupu returning as coach and leading the Pirates to finish 11th in 2015–16, 14th in 2016–17, 12th in 2017–18, 15th in 2018–19, during which Gabriel Dinică took charge for the first part of the season, followed by 8th place in 2019–20, when the season was interrupted due to the COVID-19 pandemic. Portul did not compete in 2020–21 due to the financial burden of the medical protocol imposed by the FRF.

In August 2021, Portul Constanța underwent a major reorganization after Portul Stadium had been converted in 2020 into a modular hospital for the management of the COVID-19 pandemic. Unable to use its home ground, Portul entered a collaboration agreement with another historic local club, CFR Constanța, relocating its training sessions and official matches to CFR Stadium in the Palas neighborhood, under a joint administrative structure composed of representatives of both clubs.

Beginning with the 2021–22 season, the team was again led by Gabriel Șimu, finishing 12th, 6th in 2022–23, 10th in 2023–24, and runners-up in 2012–13. In the 2025–26 season, Portul won the county title and returned to Liga III after a seventeen-season absence, defeating Făurei, the Liga IV Brăila County winners, with 2–0 wins in both legs.

Chronology of names
Name	Period
SPM Constanța	1930–1945
PCA Constanța	1945–1949
SPT Constanța	1949–1952
Șantierul Constanța	1952–1954
Metalul SNC Constanța	1954–1956
Energia Metalul Constanța	1956–1957
SNC Constanța	1957–1958
SNM Constanța	1958–1961
Portul Constanța	1961–present

== Honours ==
Liga III

- Winners (4): 1946–47, 1966–67, 1990–91, 2004–05
- Runners-up (7): 1958–59, 1964–65, 1975–76, 1980–81, 1981–82, 1999–2000, 2000–01

Liga IV – Constanța County

- Winners (2): 1998–99, 2025–26

Dobrogea Regional Championship

- Winners (3): 1952, 1955, 1962–63

== Notable former players ==
The footballers mentioned below have played at least 1 season for Portul Constanța and also played in Liga I for another team.

- (Romania) Iosif Bükössy
- (Romania) Dumitru Caraman
- (Romania) Mugurel Cornățeanu
- (Romania) Constantin Koszka
- (Romania) Ștefan Petcu
- (Romania) Adrian Pitu

== Former managers ==
- (Greece) (Romania) Kostas Choumis (1959–1961)
- (Romania) Mihai Tudor (1962–1963)
- (Romania) Lucrețiu Florescu (1966–1967)
- (Romania) Emanoil Hașoti (1968–1969)
- (Romania) Ion Troancă (1970)
- (Romania) Constantin Tâlvescu (1970–1972)
- (Romania) Iosif Bükössy (1972–1974)
- (Romania) Vasile Luban (1975–1977)
- (Romania) Romeo Giovani (1979–1992)
- (Romania) Ion Constantinescu (2000–2001)
- (Romania) Ion Constantinescu (2005–2006)
- (Romania) Cristian Cămui (2006)
- (Romania) Constantin Funda (2006–2007)
- (Romania) Constantin Tâlvescu (2007)
- (Romania) Gabriel Șimu (2009–2012)
- (Romania) Doru Lupu (2012–2018)
- (Romania) Gabriel Dinică (2018)
- (Romania) Doru Lupu (2019–2020)
- (Romania) Gabriel Șimu (2021–)
- (Romania) Daniel Rădulescu
