= Jack Moisescu =

Romanian footballer

Personal information
- Date of birth: 16 October 1920
- Place of birth: Bârlad, Romania
- Date of death: 24 May 2000 (aged 79)
- Place of death: São Paulo, Brazil
- Position: Forward

Senior career*
| Years | Team | Apps | (Gls) |
| 1946–1948 | Ciocanul București | 48 | (14) |
| 1948–1950 | Dinamo București | 27 | (5) |
| Total | | 75 | (19) |

International career
| 1947 | Romania | 1 | (0) |
- * Club domestic league appearances and goals

Jack Moisescu (16 October 1920 – 24 May 2000) was a Romanian football forward.

== Club career ==
Moisescu, who was of Jewish origin, was born on 16 October 1920 in Bârlad, Romania. In 1946, he went to play football at Ciocanul București, making his Divizia A debut on 25 August 1946 under coach Béla Guttmann in a 1–0 home win over Ferar Cluj. He scored his first goal on 20 October in a 2–1 home loss to Universitatea Cluj. After one more season spent at Ciocanul, the team merged with Carmen București in order to create Dinamo București.

Moisescu stayed with the new club and on 21 November 1948, he played in the first ever CSCA București - Dinamo București derby which ended with a 1–0 victory. On 29 June 1949, he scored once in the derby which ended with a 3–3 draw. On 23 April 1950, Moisescu made his last Divizia A appearance when he entered the field at half-time to replace Titus Ozon in a 1–0 away loss to Progresul Oradea, totaling 75 matches with 19 goals in the competition.

== International career ==
Moisescu played one game for Romania, when on 25 May 1947, coach Colea Vâlcov sent him at half-time to replace Nicolae Dumitrescu in a 4–0 away victory against Albania in the 1947 Balkan Cup.

== Death ==
Moisescu died on 24 May 2000 in São Paulo, Brazil at age 79.
