= Stadion Gladbeck =

Association football venue in Gladbeck, Germany

Coordinates: 51°33′42″N 6°59′14″E

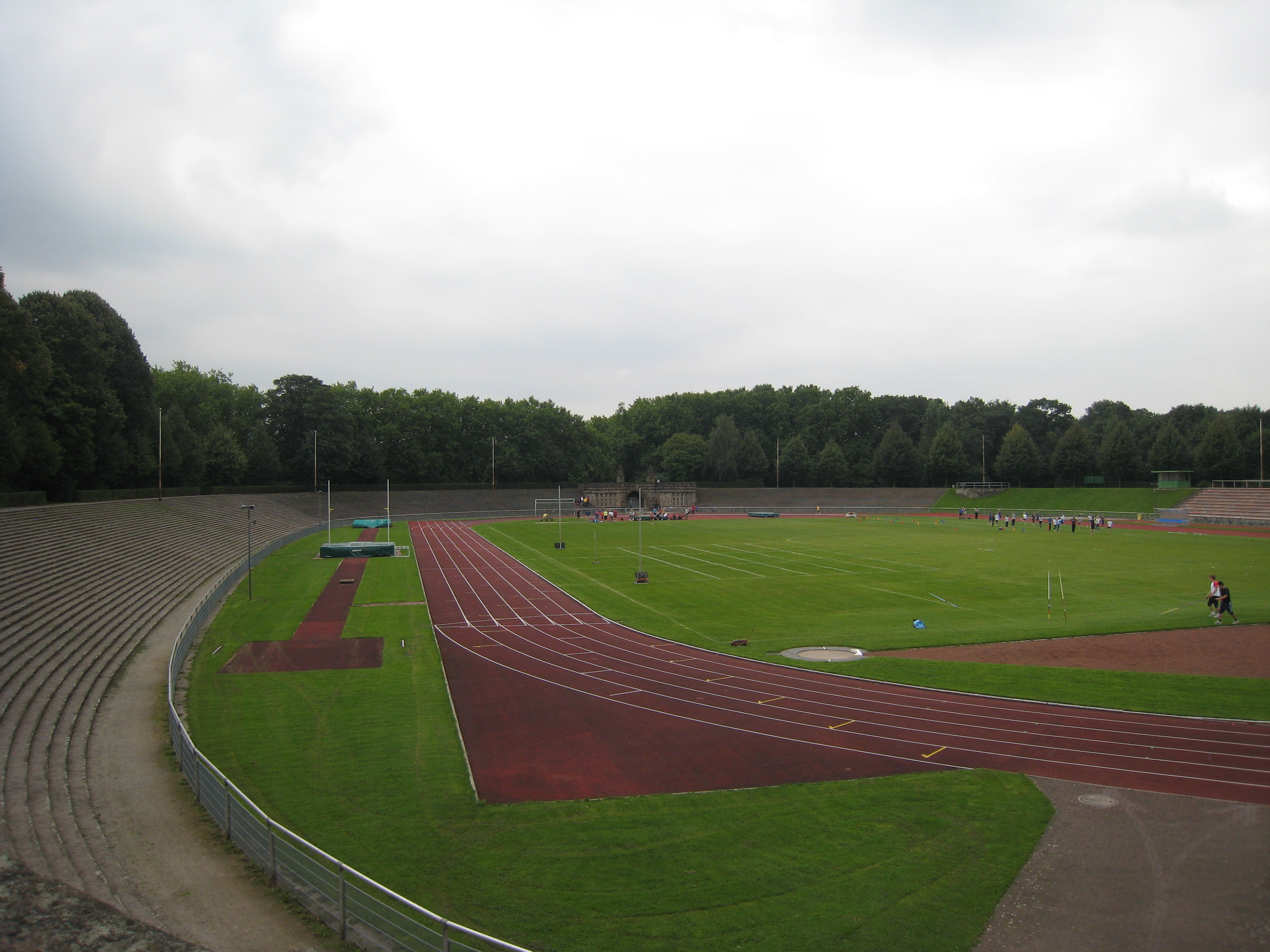
- Interactive map of Stadion Gladbeck
- Full name: Stadion Gladbeck
- Location: Gladbeck, Germany
- Owner: Germania Gladbeck
- Operator: Germania Gladbeck
- Capacity: 37,612 (record); 15,000 (current)

Construction
- Opened: May 17, 1928

Tenants
- Germania Gladbeck (1923-2010); Allemania Gladbeck (2010-)

Stadion Gladbeck is a multi-use stadium in Gladbeck, Germany. It was used as the stadium of Germania Gladbeck before they disbanded. The stadium has 15,000 seats in total, and houses all kind of facilities for athletes. During WWII, the stadium was badly damaged by the Allied Forces. The three entrance structures and the standing wall of the east side was destroyed, with bomb craters in the field. It was fixed by the good samaritans of the city in 1947. In October 2008, the stadium was used to shoot a film.
