= Iosif Bükössy =

Romanian footballer

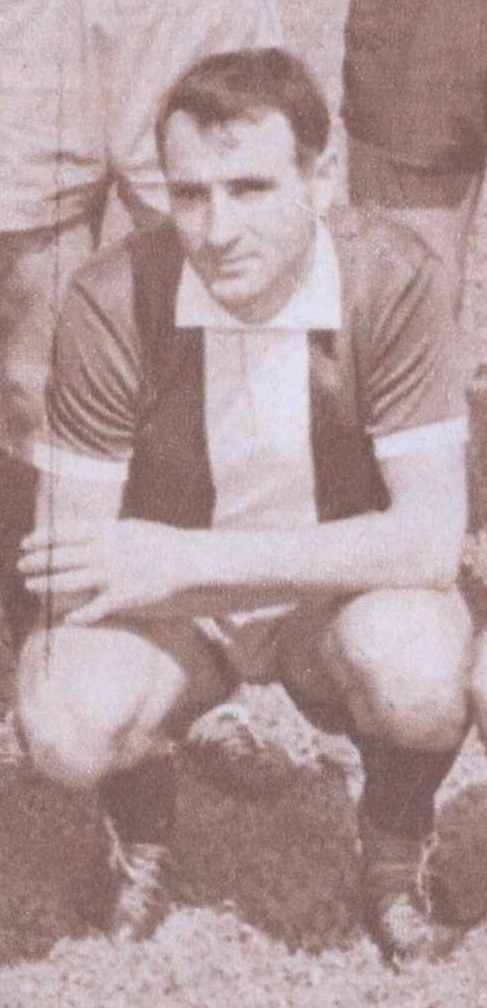

Personal information
- Date of birth: 12 August 1936
- Place of birth: Mediaș, Romania
- Date of death: 30 October 2006 (aged 70)
- Place of death: Bucharest, Romania
- Height: 1.76 m (5 ft 9 in)
- Position: Forward

Youth career
- 1948–1953: Sparta Mediaș

Senior career*
Years	Team	Apps	(Gls)
1954–1955	Flacăra Mediaș		
1955	Progresul CPCS București		
1956–1958	CCA București	7	(2)
1958–1960	Dinamo București	16	(3)
1960–1962	Dinamo Obor București		
1962–1967	Farul Constanța	82	(19)
1967–1970	Portul Constanța	55	(19)
Total		160	(43)

International career
1957–1958	Romania U23	3	(0)
1955–1957	Romania B	2	(0)

Managerial career
- Elpis Constanța
- * Club domestic league appearances and goals

Iosif Bükössy (12 August 1936 – 30 October 2006) was a Romanian footballer who played as a forward.

== Club career ==
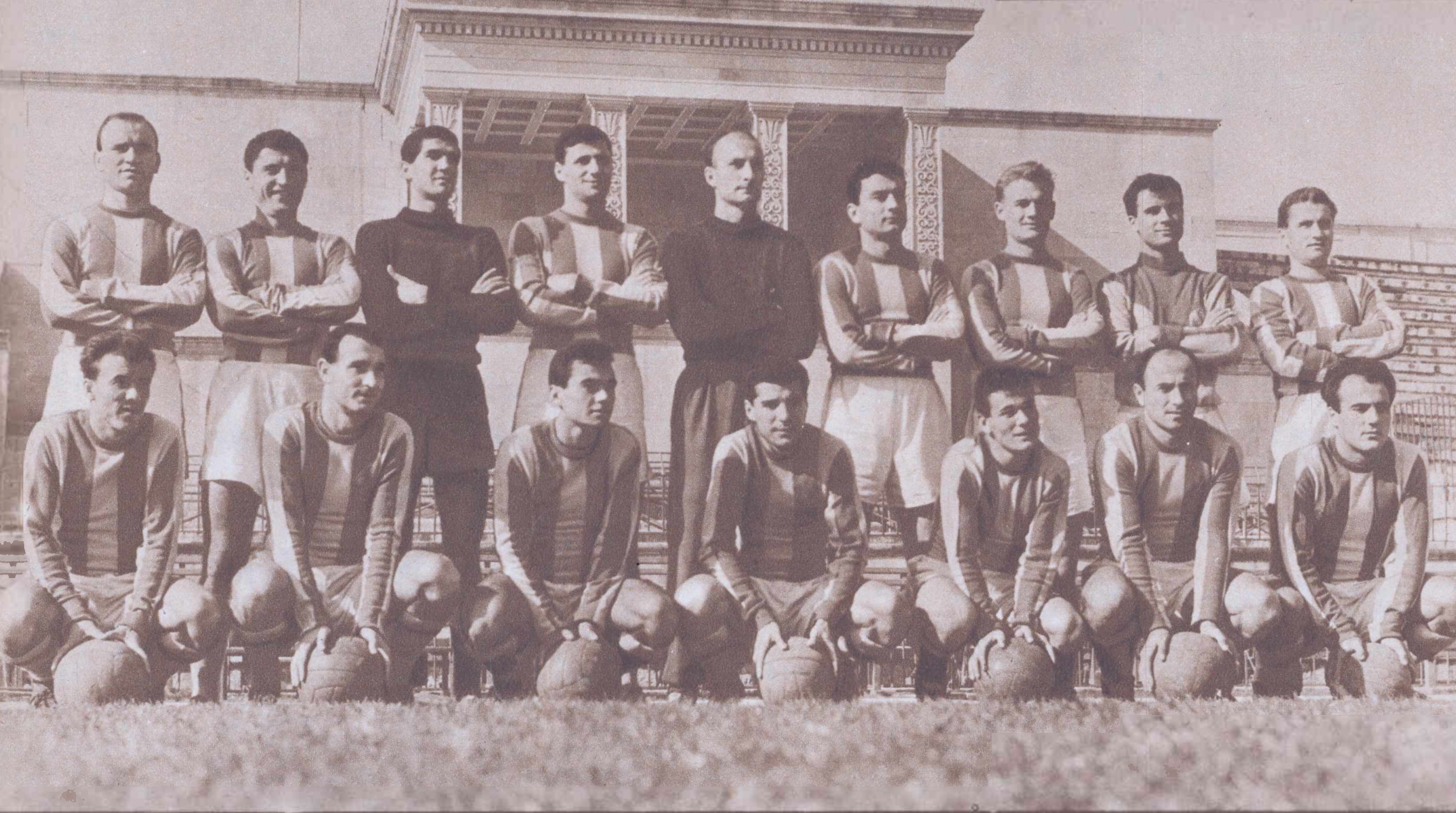
Bükössy (second from left, front row) with Farul Constanța in 1963

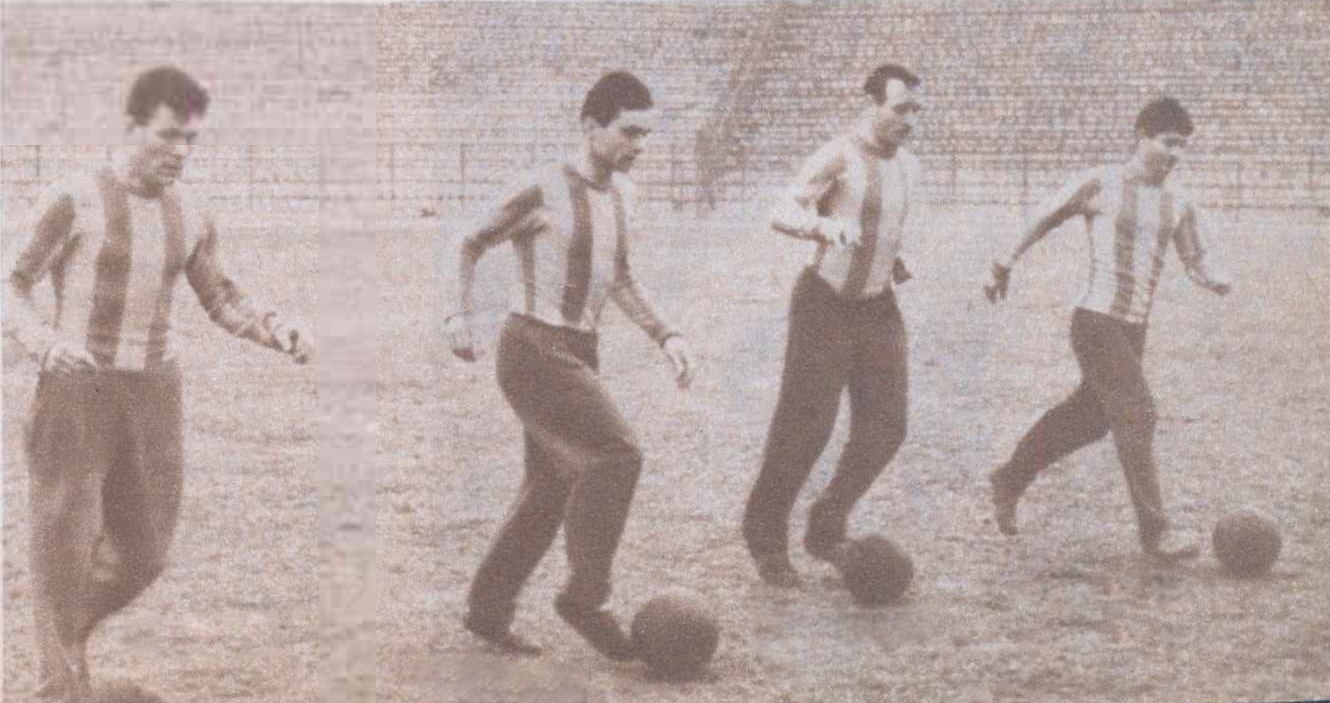
Bükössy (second from right) during a Farul training session in 1965

Bükössy was born on 12 August 1936 in Mediaș, Romania and began playing football in 1948 at local club Sparta. In 1954 he moved to neighboring club, Flacăra where he spent two seasons playing in Divizia B. Afterwards he had a short spell at Progresul CPCS București, also in Divizia B. Bükössy switched teams again when he joined CCA București where he made his Divizia A debut under coach Ștefan Dobay on 27 May 1956 in a 3–1 away loss to Progresul Oradea. He made a total of three appearances in his first season spent at the club, helping it win the title. After two more seasons spent with The Military Men, Bükössy went to play for rivals Dinamo București. In his first season with The Red Dogs, they finished in second place in the league and won the 1958–59 Cupa României, but coach Iuliu Baratky did not use him in the final. In his second season he scored once in a derby that ended in a 3–3 draw against his former team, CCA. Afterwards, Bükössy went to play two years at Divizia B club Dinamo Obor București. He returned to Divizia A football in 1962, joining Farul Constanța where he had a successful period in his career, being a part of the team's prolific offensive trio alongside Constantin Dinulescu and Ion Ciosescu. Bükössy made his last Divizia A appearance on 7 May 1967 in Farul's 1–1 draw against Politehnica Timișoara, totaling 103 matches with 23 goals in the competition. He ended his career after playing three more seasons in Divizia B at Portul Constanța.

== International career ==
Between 1955 and 1958, Bükössy represented his country internationally, making appearances for Romania's under-23 and B squads.

== Coaching career ==
After he retired from playing football, Bükössy worked mainly at Farul Constanța's youth center where he taught generations of players, which include Gheorghe Hagi, Ianis Zicu, Vasile Mănăilă and Dorel Zamfir. He also had a three-year spell at Elpis Constanța. After Bükössy's death in 2006, Gheorghe Hagi stated that Bükössy was the best coach he had in his entire career, also saying:"For me, Bükössy was like a second father. Now that he is no longer among us, I feel a great sadness in my soul. I knew that he went through a difficult period and that he could not recover after the operation. I feel very sorry for him, may God forgive him! I will never forget him (...) I learned everything from him, he showed me the secrets of football. Basically, he is the man who raised me. He was an extraordinary man, who dedicated his whole life to raising children. He did only good in life. Even though I have done it many times before, I want to thank him once more for what he did for me".

== Honours ==
CCA București

- Divizia A: 1956

Dinamo București

- Cupa României: 1958–59
