= Bordușani =

- Commune
- Location in Ialomița County

- Location in Romania
- Coordinates: 44.4725°N 27.8997°E
- Country: Romania
- County: Ialomița

Government
  - Mayor (2024–2028): Vasile Bobocel Marin (PSD)
- Area: 222.18 km^{2} (85.78 sq mi)
- Elevation: 15 m (49 ft)
- Population (2021-12-01): 4,414
  - Density: 19.87/km^{2} (51.45/sq mi)
- Time zone: UTC+02:00 (EET)
  - Summer (DST): UTC+03:00 (EEST)
- Postal code: 927050
- Area code: +(40) 243
- Vehicle reg.: IL
- Website: primariabordusani.ro

Bordușani is a commune located in Ialomița County, Muntenia, Romania. It is composed of two villages, Bordușani and Cegani.

The commune is situated in the Bărăgan Plain, on the left bank of the Danube. It is located at the eastern extremity of Ialomița County, 15 km (9.3 mi) north of Fetești and 56 km (35 mi) east of the county seat, Slobozia, on the border with Constanța County.

Historical population
| Year | Pop. | ±% |
|---|---|---|
| 1899 | 1,057 | — |
| 1925 | 3,427 | +224.2% |
| 2002 | 5,340 | +55.8% |
| 2011 | 4,786 | −10.4% |
| 2021 | 4,414 | −7.8% |
Source: Census data

At the end of the 19th century, the Bordușani commune was part of plasa Ialomița-Balta of Ialomița County and included the villages of Bordușanii Mari, Bordușanii Mici, and Lăteni, as well as the hamlets of Grindu-Pietriș and Movila-Cabălul, with a total population of 1,057 inhabitants.

At the 2021 census, the commune had a population of 4,414; of those, 85.8% were Romanians, 3.96% Russian Lipovans, and 2.42% Roma.

== Natives ==
- Vasile Mănăilă (1962–2025), football player and coach
