= Eternal derby (Romania) =

Football rivalry between Bucharest clubs

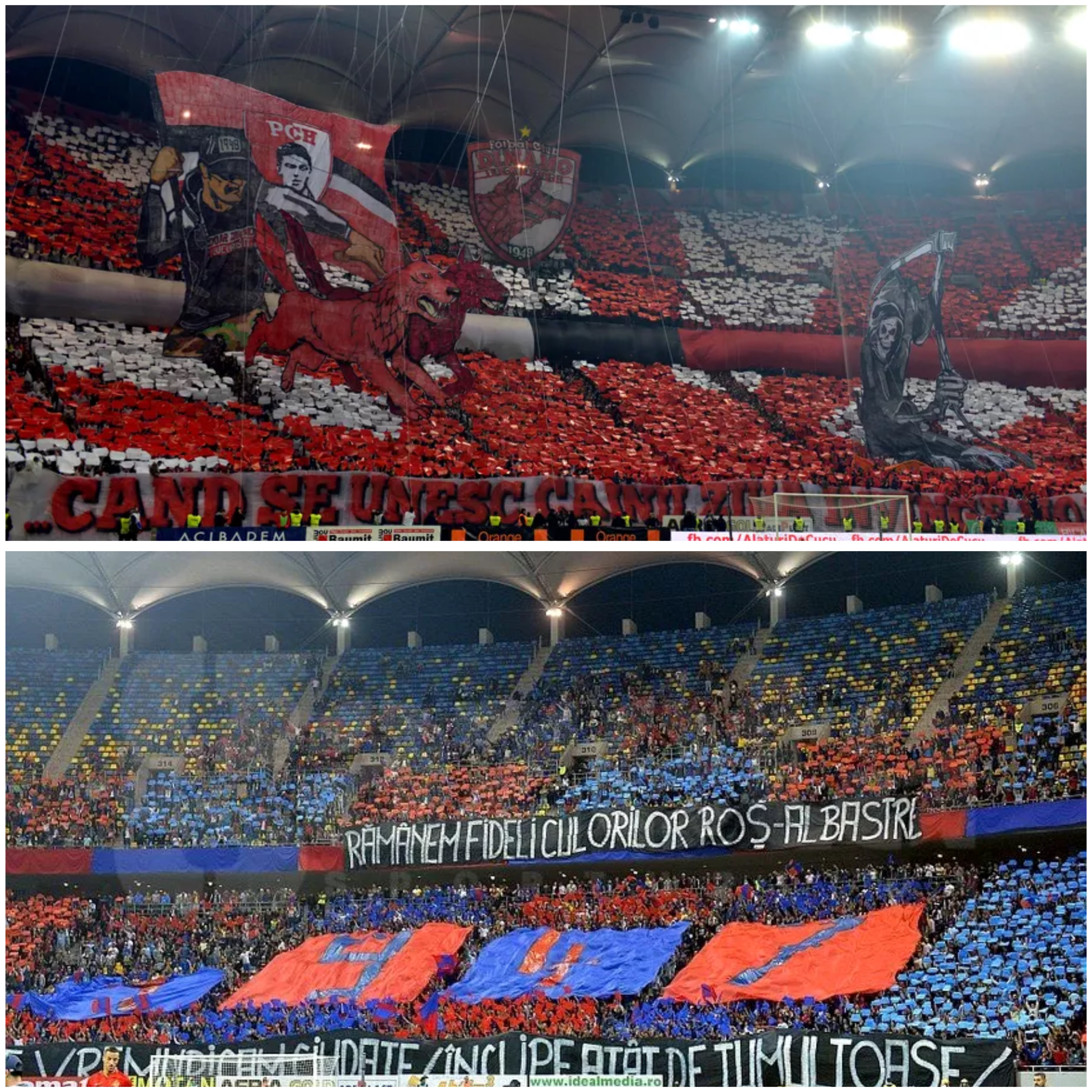
- Other names: Eternul Derby, Marele Derby, Derby de România or Clasicul României
- Location: Bucharest, Romania
- Teams: FCSB; FC Dinamo București
- First meeting: CSCA București 0–1 Dinamo București (21 November 1948)
- Latest meeting: Dinamo București 2–1 FCSB (5 September 2026)
- Stadiums: Stadionul Steaua/Steaua Stadium/Arena Nationala (Steaua/FCSB/Dinamo); Stadionul Dinamo (Dinamo); Stadionul 23 August (Steaua/Dinamo)

Statistics
- Total meetings: 194
- Most wins: FCSB (71)
- Most player appearances: Ionel Dănciulescu (35)
- Top scorer: Florea Voinea, Ionel Dănciulescu (13)
- All-time series: Steaua/FCSB: 73; Drawn: 58; Dinamo: 63
- Largest victory: FCSB 6–0 Dinamo București (12 September 2021)

The Eternal derby (Romanian: Eternul derby), also called the Romanian derby (Romanian: Derby-ul României or Derby de România) or the Great derby (Romanian: Marele derby), is a football match between Bucharest rivals FCSB and Dinamo București. The game is usually among—if not the most—viewed and attended of the Liga I season. The two most successful clubs in Romania, (Note: There is currently a legal debate over the identity of FC Steaua București—CSA Steaua owns the name and brand, while FCSB claims the ongoing top-division history.) they won a combined 95 honours: a record 61 for Steaua/FCSB (including two international trophies) and 34 for Dinamo București.

The teams have played 192 matches in all domestic top-level competitions. FCSB have won 72 times to Dinamo's 63, with 57 drawn.

== History ==
The first game between the two teams was played on 21 November 1948. Dinamo won 1–0. The events are regularly marred by instances of hooliganism and frequent outbreaks of violence between rival fan groups.

The two teams are notable for their collective dominance of Romanian football. Between them, FCSB (28 times) and Dinamo (18 times) have won the Romanian football championship 46 times out of 108 completed seasons, resulting in a percentage of 42.59%. This supremacy extends also to the Cupa României (24 times for FCSB and 13 times for Dinamo), to the Supercupa României (8 times for FCSB and 2 times for Dinamo) and to the Cupa Ligii (2 times for FCSB and 1 time for Dinamo).

They are also the two Romanian football teams with the best results in club competitions organised by UEFA. FCSB won the European Cup in 1986, was runner-up in the same competition in 1989 after reaching the semi-finals in 1988. In 2006, FCSB reached the semi-finals of UEFA Europa League. Meanwhile, Dinamo reached the semi-finals of the European Cup in 1984 and in the Cup Winners' Cup in 1990. Additionally, FCSB won the UEFA Super Cup in 1986, but was defeated in the Intercontinental Cup by River Plate the same year.

The rivalry also extends to a number of other sports, including rugby, handball and water polo.

=== Honours ===
Competition	Steaua/FCSB	Dinamo
Liga I	28	18
Cupa României	24	13
Cupa Ligii	2	1
Supercupa României	8	2
UEFA Champions League / European Cup	1	0
UEFA Super Cup / European Super Cup	1	0
Total	64	34

== Records ==
- Largest win (all competitions): FCSB 6–0 Dinamo București on 12 September 2021
- Largest home win (championship): FCSB 6–0 Dinamo București on 12 September 2021
- Largest away win (championship): Dinamo București 0–4 CCA București on 11 April 1956
- The most goals in one match (all competitions): 10 in Dinamo București 6–4 Steaua București on 2 May 1990
- The most goals in one match (championship): 8 in Dinamo București 6–2 CCA București on 1 October 1951

== Head to head results ==
Tournament	GP	Wins Steaua/FCSB	Draws	Wins Dinamo	Goals Steaua/FCSB	Goals Dinamo
Liga I	160	54	55	51	229	208
Cupa României	30	18	3	9	58	41
Supercupa României	2	1	0	1	4	4
Cupa Ligii	2	0	0	2	2	7
TOTAL	194	73	58	63	293	260
Updated: 5 September 2026

== Matches ==
CSCA/CCA/Steaua/FCSB win Draw Dinamo win

=== Liga I ===
#	Date	Home team	Score	Away team	Goals (home)	Goals (away)
1	21 November 1948	CSCA	0–1 (0–1)	Dinamo	—	M. Apostol (42)
2	29 June 1949	Dinamo	3–3 (1–2)	CSCA	Moisescu (30), Farkaș (p. 71, 86)	N. Drăgan (25), Hallasz (40), Serfözö (49)
3	19 March 1950	Dinamo	2–2 (1–1)	CCA	Farkaș (37, 56)	N. Drăgan (33, 63)
4	13 August 1950	CCA	0–1 (0–1)	Dinamo	—	C. Popescu (43)
5	6 May 1951	CCA	2–1 (2–0)	Dinamo	Zavoda I (20), N. Roman (25)	Ambru (53)
6	1 October 1951	Dinamo	6–2 (2–0)	CCA	Lutz (5), Dumitru (36), Ene I (54, 57, 71), Suru (73)	Moldoveanu (p. 68), Ferenczi (82)
7	17 August 1952	CCA	1–1 (0–1)	Dinamo	Ene I (37)	V. Moldovan (74)
8	2 November 1952	Dinamo	1–0 (0–0)	CCA	Ozon (83)	—
9	22 April 1953	Dinamo	2–1 (0–0)	CCA	N. Voinescu (77), Ambru (85)	Bone (60)
10	6 October 1953	CCA	1–3 (0–3)	Dinamo	Ivănescu (85)	Ozon (19), A. Florea (23, 43)
11	16 June 1954	Dinamo	0–0 (0–0)	CCA	—	—
12	17 October 1954	CCA	2–2 (2–1)	Dinamo	Alecsandrescu (11, 20)	Ene I (42), Szökő (73)
13	13 April 1955	CCA	0–0 (0–0)	Dinamo	—	—
14	6 November 1955	Dinamo	2–1 (1–1)	CCA	Neagu (20, 60)	Tătaru I (1)
15	11 April 1956	Dinamo	0–4 (0–2)	CCA	—	Zavoda I (19), Tătaru I (26, 80), Alecsandrescu (74)
16	16 September 1956	CCA	4–3 (4–1)	Dinamo	Constantin (30, 36), Tătaru I (32), Alecsandrescu (69)	Neagu (38), I. Nunweiller (51), Ene I (67)
17	9 October 1957	Dinamo	3–2 (2–1)	CCA	Suru (37), Dumitru (43), Ene I (54)	G. Tătaru I (15), Constantin (87)
18	5 June 1958	CCA	2–0 (2–0)	Dinamo	Alecsandrescu (8, 12)	—
19	12 October 1958	CCA	0–2 (0–1)	Dinamo	—	Ene I (43), Szakacs (85)
20	10 May 1959	Dinamo	0–1 (0–1)	CCA	—	Alecsandrescu (35)
21	16 September 1959	Dinamo	2–1 (0–0)	CCA	I. Nunweiller (79, 87)	Raksi (86)
22	20 March 1960	CCA	3–3 (1–2)	Dinamo	Alecsandrescu (22), Constantin (81, 85)	I. Voinescu (a. 25), Bükössy (29), Varga (74)
23	13 November 1960	CCA	3–2 (2–2)	Dinamo	Alecsandrescu (15), Constantin (p. 43, 81)	Varga (17), Țîrcovnicu (19)
24	26 June 1961	Dinamo	2–3 (1–3)	CCA	Frățilă (2), I. Nunweiller (77)	Constantin (5), Raksi (26), Tătaru I (31)
25	1 November 1961	Dinamo	1–1 (1–0)	CCA	David (1)	Constantin (p. 85)
26	30 April 1962	CCA	0–1 (0–0)	Dinamo	—	Varga (p. 59)
27	11 November 1962	Dinamo	2–2 (0–0)	Steaua	Țîrcovnicu (53), D. Ivan (85)	Raksi (47), Voinea (78)
28	26 May 1963	Steaua	0–0 (0–0)	Dinamo	—	—
29	13 October 1963	Dinamo	3–2 (0–1)	Steaua	Ene II (47), Frățilă (59, 64)	Voinea (16, 71)
30	10 May 1964	Steaua	4–1 (1–0)	Dinamo	Pavlovici (15, 60, 75), Voinea (56)	Frățilă (80)
31	27 December 1964	Steaua	0–1 (0–0)	Dinamo	—	I. Haidu (71)
32	2 June 1965	Dinamo	2–1 (1–1)	Steaua	E. Petru (45), Frățilă (65)	Avram (10)
33	3 October 1965	Steaua	3–3 (1–1)	Dinamo	Pavlovici (3, p. 58), Creiniceanu (85)	Ene II (7), O. Popescu (47), Pârcălab (84)
34	8 May 1966	Dinamo	1–1 (1–0)	Steaua	Varga (31)	Voinea (89)
35	4 September 1966	Dinamo	1–1 (1–0)	Steaua	Petescu (a. 18)	Constantin (56)
36	15 March 1967	Steaua	1–0 (0–0)	Dinamo	Voinea (77)	—
37	23 September 1967	Dinamo	0–1 (0–0)	Steaua	—	Negrea (55)
38	21 April 1968	Steaua	0–2 (0–1)	Dinamo	—	Nagy (14), Pârcălab (55)
39	1 September 1968	Steaua	0–1 (0–0)	Dinamo	—	M. Lucescu (86)
40	26 March 1969	Dinamo	4–2 (0–1)	Steaua	Dumitrache (50), M. Lucescu (60), Boc (73), Frățilă (78)	Pantea (5), Voinea (69)
41	7 September 1969	Steaua	2–3 (0–2)	Dinamo	Creiniceanu (53), Tătaru II (70)	Sălceanu (17, 52), Dumitrache (25)
42	29 March 1970	Dinamo	0–1 (0–1)	Steaua	—	Tătaru II (8)
43	25 October 1970	Dinamo	3–0 (2–0)	Steaua	Sălceanu (41), R. Nunweiller (42), Dinu (67)	—
44	9 May 1971	Steaua	0–1 (0–1)	Dinamo	—	Sălceanu (17)
45	1 December 1971	Dinamo	1–0 (0–0)	Steaua	R. Nunweiller (68)	—
46	4 June 1972	Steaua	0–1 (0–1)	Dinamo	—	Dumitriu II (8)
47	19 November 1972	Dinamo	2–1 (1–1)	Steaua	M. Lucescu (9), Dumitrache (56)	I. Dumitru (8)
48	10 June 1973	Steaua	0–2 (0–1)	Dinamo	—	A. Moldovan (p. 17), Dumitrache (70)
49	11 November 1973	Dinamo	0–2 (0–1)	Steaua	—	I. Dumitru (10), Pantea (54)
50	26 May 1974	Steaua	1–3 (0–2)	Dinamo	Iordănescu (79)	M. Lucescu (13), Dumitrache (30), Custov (51)
51	25 August 1974	Dinamo	2–0 (0–0)	Steaua	T. Zamfir (72), M. Lucescu (83)	—
52	15 March 1975	Steaua	1–3 (0–0)	Dinamo	Vigu (63)	G. Sandu (70), D. Georgescu (74), M. Lucescu (89)
53	2 November 1975	Dinamo	3–3 (1–2)	Steaua	D. Georgescu (43, 52), A. Sătmăreanu (45)	Co. Zamfir (21), Iordănescu (46), Dobrău (a. 46)
54	23 May 1976	Steaua	1–1 (0–1)	Dinamo	Iordănescu (p. 73)	D. Georgescu (35)
55	1 September 1976	Dinamo	5–2 (2–1)	Steaua	Custov (3), D. Georgescu (39, 90), M. Lucescu (70), I. Moldovan (83)	Troi (10), M. Răducanu (76)
56	27 March 1977	Steaua	2–2 (2–2)	Dinamo	Vigu (29), Năstase (43)	M. Lucescu (15, 45)
57	27 November 1977	Steaua	3–3 (3–2)	Dinamo	Troi (9), Năstase (15, 40)	D. Georgescu (6), Vrînceanu (45), I. Moldovan (67)
58	4 June 1978	Dinamo	0–1 (0–0)	Steaua	—	Iordănescu (72)
59	26 November 1978	Dinamo	1–1 (1–1)	Steaua	I. Moldovan (11)	T. Stoica (7)
60	6 June 1979	Steaua	2–1 (1–1)	Dinamo	M. Răducanu (8), Iordănescu (73)	D. Georgescu (38)
61	9 September 1979	Steaua	1–1 (0–1)	Dinamo	Agiu (72)	Apostol (41)
62	16 March 1980	Dinamo	1–1 (1–1)	Steaua	Augustin (33)	Ad. Ionescu (41)
63	5 October 1980	Dinamo	0–2 (0–2)	Steaua	—	Zahiu (16), M. Răducanu (45)
64	3 May 1981	Steaua	1–1 (0–1)	Dinamo	Sameș (85)	Dragnea (22)
65	14 October 1981	Steaua	0–0 (0–0)	Dinamo	—	—
66	18 April 1982	Dinamo	2–1 (1–1)	Steaua	Mulțescu (30), D. Georgescu (77)	Majearu (p. 15)
67	3 October 1982	Steaua	1–1 (0–0)	Dinamo	Eduard (68)	Mulțescu (58)
68	22 April 1983	Dinamo	1–1 (0–0)	Steaua	A. Nicolae (49)	Iovan (66)
69	22 October 1983	Dinamo	0–3 (0–1)	Steaua	—	Lăcătuș (3), Majearu (49), Turcu (89)
70	16 May 1984	Steaua	1–1 (1–0)	Dinamo	Laurențiu (28)	Augustin (67)
71	11 November 1984	Steaua	1–2 (1–1)	Dinamo	Petcu (26)	Andone (34), Dragnea (81)
72	15 May 1985	Dinamo	0–0 (0–0)	Steaua	—	—
73	18 August 1985	Steaua	1–0 (1–0)	Dinamo	Pițurcă (34)	—
74	28 May 1986	Dinamo	2–1 (1–0)	Steaua	M. Damaschin (11), Mihăescu (77)	Majearu (p. 80)
75	26 November 1986	Steaua	3–0 (1–0)	Dinamo	Bumbescu (5), Pițurcă (57, p. 79)	—
76	13 May 1987	Dinamo	1–1 (1–0)	Steaua	Mateuț (35)	Weissenbacher (69)
77	2 December 1987	Dinamo	0–0 (0–0)	Steaua	—	—
78	8 June 1988	Steaua	3–3 (1–1)	Dinamo	Hagi (p. 15, 57), Lăcătuș (49)	Vaișcovici (p. 32, 65), Cămătaru (61)
79	3 December 1988	Dinamo	0–0 (0–0)	Steaua	—	—
80	22 March 1989	Steaua	2–1 (1–0)	Dinamo	Hagi (14), Balint (87)	Andone (75)
81	9 September 1989	Steaua	0–3 (0–1)	Dinamo	—	Mateuț (15), D. Timofte (76), Ce. Zamfir (84)
82	15 March 1990	Dinamo	2–2 (0–1)	Steaua	Răducioiu (58), Lupu (p. 83)	Hagi (14), Balint (79)
83	10 October 1990	Dinamo	1–0 (1–0)	Steaua	M. Damaschin (22)	—
84	5 May 1991	Steaua	1–0 (0–0)	Dinamo	D. Petrescu (55)	—
85	6 October 1991	Dinamo	1–0 (0–0)	Steaua	Demollari (63)	—
86	19 April 1992	Steaua	1–1 (0–1)	Dinamo	Doboș (78)	Gerstenmájer (18)
87	26 September 1992	Steaua	1–0 (1–0)	Dinamo	I. Dumitrescu (10)	—
88	25 April 1993	Dinamo	1–1 (0–0)	Steaua	Hanganu (54)	Panduru (73)
89	15 August 1993	Dinamo	0–3 (0–0)	Steaua	—	Vlădoiu (58), I. Dumitrescu (76), Ad. Ilie (85)
90	4 December 1993	Steaua	1–0 (0–0)	Dinamo	I. Dumitrescu (70)	—
91	2 October 1994	Steaua	2–0 (0–0)	Dinamo	Ad. Ilie (53), Roșu (75)	—
92	14 April 1995	Dinamo	0–0 (0–0)	Steaua	—	—
93	22 September 1995	Dinamo	1–1 (0–0)	Steaua	Csik II (70)	Roșu (56)
94	6 March 1996	Steaua	4–2 (1–0)	Dinamo	Pârvu (35), Vlădoiu (49, 69, p. 78)	Dănciulescu (80, 85)
95	2 November 1996	Dinamo	0–0 (0–0)	Steaua	—	—
96	10 May 1997	Steaua	3–1 (2–0)	Dinamo	Ciocoiu (32, 43), D. Șerban (90)	Mihalcea (55)
97	15 October 1997	Dinamo	1–3 (1–0)	Steaua	Mihalcea (18)	A. Matei (74), C. Munteanu (p. 78), Dănciulescu (85)
98	4 April 1998	Steaua	5–0 (2–0)	Dinamo	Dănciulescu (19, 65), I. Rotariu (35), D. Șerban (57), Ciocoiu (87)	—
99	8 November 1998	Steaua	1–1 (1–0)	Dinamo	Dănciulescu (25)	Contra (65)
100	15 May 1999	Dinamo	0–0 (0–0)	Steaua	—	—
101	24 October 1999	Steaua	1–1 (0–1)	Dinamo	Roșu (60)	Mutu (8)
102	22 April 2000	Dinamo	3–2 (1–1)	Steaua	Fl. Petre (44), Lupescu (52), Mihalcea (73)	Ciocoiu (26), Dănciulescu (71)
103	19 August 2000	Steaua	4–1 (1–0)	Dinamo	Vlădoiu (15, 89, 90), Dănciulescu (70)	Kiriță (72)
104	1 April 2001	Dinamo	1–0 (0–0)	Steaua	R. Niculescu (a. 80)	—
105	3 November 2001	Dinamo	2–0 (1–0)	Steaua	Mihalcea (26), Bolohan (49)	—
106	19 May 2002	Steaua	2–2 (1–2)	Dinamo	Cl. Răducanu (12), Luca (78)	Vl. Munteanu (4), Onuț (15)
107	15 September 2002	Steaua	1–1 (0–0)	Dinamo	Miu (52)	Vl. Munteanu (73)
108	23 March 2003	Dinamo	2–4 (1–2)	Steaua	Dănciulescu (p. 33), Tameș (90+1)	Cl. Răducanu (5, 90+3), Boștină (45), Aliuță (55)
109	23 August 2003	Steaua	1–0 (0–0)	Dinamo	Cl. Răducanu (50)	—
110	27 March 2004	Dinamo	2–1 (1–0)	Steaua	Bărcăuan (21), Grigorie (90+3)	Neaga (88)
111	22 August 2004	Dinamo	0–1 (0–0)	Steaua	—	An. Cristea (84)
112	10 April 2005	Steaua	1–0 (1–0)	Dinamo	Dică (10)	—
113	18 September 2005	Steaua	2–2 (2–1)	Dinamo	Goian (6), Dică (15)	Zicu (41), Bălțoi (87)
114	9 April 2006	Dinamo	1–1 (1–0)	Steaua	Cl. Niculescu (38)	Cristocea (90+2)
115	20 September 2006	Dinamo	1–0 (0–0)	Steaua	D. Șerban (90+1)	—
116	7 April 2007	Steaua	2–4 (0–3)	Dinamo	V. Badea (47), Théréau (90+7)	C. Munteanu (7), Dănciulescu (22), Cl. Niculescu (34, 50)
117	24 November 2007	Steaua	1–0 (0–0)	Dinamo	Neaga (66)	—
118	4 May 2008	Dinamo	2–1 (1–0)	Steaua	Bratu (p. 41), Dănciulescu (57)	Ghionea (70)
119	1 November 2008	Dinamo	1–1 (0–1)	Steaua	Ad. Cristea (84)	Kapetanos (8)
120	8 May 2009	Steaua	1–1 (0–0)	Dinamo	Moți (a. 81)	P. Marin (a. 88)
121	30 August 2009	Steaua	0–1 (0–1)	Dinamo	—	Tamaș (23)
122	17 March 2010	Dinamo	2–0 (1–0)	Steaua	Alexe (39), An. Cristea (82)	—
123	17 October 2010	Dinamo	2–1 (2–1)	Steaua	Ad. Cristea (p. 31), Niculae (p. 35)	Stancu (23)
124	25 April 2011	Steaua	0–1 (0–1)	Dinamo	—	Torje (26)
125	5 December 2011	Dinamo	1–3 (1–1)	Steaua	Niculae (20)	Rusescu (22, 59), M. Costea (90+2)
126	17 May 2012	Steaua	3–2 (1–1)	Dinamo	Rusescu (p. 43), Iliev (48, 64)	Curtean (21), Țucudean (86)
127	4 November 2012	Steaua	3–1 (0–1)	Dinamo	Rusescu (p. 63, 83), Szukała (87)	Alexe (38)
128	10 May 2013	Dinamo	0–2 (0–1)	Steaua	—	Boubacar (a. 13), C. Tănase (69)
129	11 August 2013	Dinamo	1–2 (0–2)	Steaua	D. Rotariu (68)	Latovlevici (6), Fai (a. 38)
130	1 March 2014	Steaua	1–1 (0–0)	Dinamo	Keserü (89)	D. Grigore (57)
131	31 October 2014	Steaua	3–0 (1–0)	Dinamo	Szukała (45+2), Papp (78), Keserü (80)	—
132	3 May 2015	Dinamo	1–3 (0–0)	Steaua	Elhamed (90+13)	Stanciu (p. 60, 79), Prepeliță (p. 90+23)
133	9 August 2015	Steaua	0–0 (0–0)	Dinamo	—	—
134	22 November 2015	Dinamo	3–1 (0–0)	Steaua	Varela (a. 56), Palić (67), Gnohéré (84)	Stanciu (90+2)
135	6 March 2016	Dinamo	1–1 (0–1)	Steaua	Bicfalvi (81)	Hamroun (10)
136	10 April 2016	Steaua	1–1 (1–0)	Dinamo	Filip (a. 16))	Gnohéré (48)
137	20 August 2016	Steaua	1–1 (1–1)	Dinamo	De Amorim (17)	Rotariu (11)
138	30 November 2016	Dinamo	3–1 (2–1)	Steaua	Hanca (37 p.), Nedelcearu (45+5), Nemec (58)	Boldrin (4 p.)
139	2 April 2017	FCSB	2–1 (1–0)	Dinamo	Alibec (10), Boldrin (75)	Nemec (57)
140	1 May 2017	Dinamo	2–1 (1–0)	FCSB	Hanca (34 p., 90+6 p.)	Pleașcă (54)
141	24 September 2017	FCSB	1–0 (1–0)	Dinamo	Momčilović (31)	—
142	18 February 2018	Dinamo	2–2 (1–0)	FCSB	Pešić (20), Torje (57)	Man (83), Teixeira (90+3)
143	29 July 2018	FCSB	3–3 (1–1)	Dinamo	Gnohéré (10), Coman (55, 68)	Axente (45+2), Nistor (61), M. Popescu (89)
144	4 November 2018	Dinamo	1–1 (1–0)	FCSB	Salomão (40 p.)	F. Tănase (48)
145	5 October 2019	FCSB	1–1 (1–1)	Dinamo	Coman (28)	Ciobotariu (10)
146	16 February 2020	Dinamo	2–1 (1–1)	FCSB	Sin (37), Lazăr (62)	F. Tănase (45+9 p.)
147	3 October 2020	FCSB	3–2 (2–2)	Dinamo	F. Tănase (8, 76 p.), Cristea (17)	Valle (26 p.), Nemec (42)
148	3 February 2021	Dinamo	0–1 (0–1)	FCSB	—	F. Tănase (8)
149	12 September 2021	FCSB	6–0 (4–0)	Dinamo	Keserü (26), Popescu (43), Vinícius (45+2), Cordea (45+7 p.), Gheorghe (54), Miron (67)	—
150	30 January 2022	Dinamo	0–3 (0–1)	FCSB	—	Popescu (2), Stoica (75), Oaidă (82)
151	22 July 2023	FCSB	2–1 (2-0)	Dinamo	Coman (30), Olaru (35)	Gregório (83)
152	26 November 2023	Dinamo	0–1 (0–0)	FCSB	—	Coman (52)
153	20 October 2024	Dinamo	0–2 (0–1)	FCSB	—	Bîrligea (24), Musi (90+3)
154	23 February 2025	FCSB	2–1 (1–1)	Dinamo	Alhassan (20), Gele (57)	Perica (18)
155	30 March 2025	Dinamo	1–2 (1–1)	FCSB	Perica (24)	Miculescu (44), Alhassan (85)
156	5 May 2025	FCSB	3–1 (3–0)	Dinamo	Bîrligea (23), Popescu (26, 37)	Selmani (56)
157	2 August 2025	Dinamo	4–3 (2–1)	FCSB	Musi (34), Armstrong (45+4 p., 57 p., 79)	F. Tănase (19 p., 50, 90+1 p.)
158	6 December 2025	FCSB	0–0 (0–0)	Dinamo	—	—
159	29 May 2026	Dinamo	1–2 (0–1)	FCSB	Karamoko (73)	Dawa (10), Arad (107)
160	5 September 2026	Dinamo	2–1 (1–0)	FCSB	Pascual (36, 78)	Miculescu (84)

=== Romanian Cup (Cupa României) ===
#	Date	Level	Home team	Away team	Score	Goals (home)	Goals (away)
1	3 December 1952	Semi-finals	CCA	Dinamo	3–2	Pecsovszky (17), P. Moldoveanu (20), N. Drăgan (47)	Suru (4), Călinoiu (79)
2	20 May 1959	Quarter-finals	Dinamo	CCA	3–1	V. Anghel (30), Szakács (50, 83)	Alecsandrescu (90)
3	19 July 1964	Final	Dinamo	Steaua	5–3	O. Popescu (3, 88), R. Nunweiller (53), Pârcălab (60), Frățilă (83)	Creiniceanu (12), Constantin (p. 14, 63)
4	22 June 1966	Quarter-finals	Steaua	Dinamo	2–0	Voinea (19, 49)	—
5	22 June 1969	Final	Steaua	Dinamo	2–1	Voinea (43, 75)	Dumitrache (50)
6	26 July 1970	Final	Steaua	Dinamo	2–1	Voinea (7, 56)	Dumitrache (79)
7	4 July 1971	Final	Steaua	Dinamo	3–2	Tătaru II (p. 23, 30, 80)	M. Lucescu (2, p. 58)
8	8 December 1976	Last 32	Dinamo	Steaua	1–4	A. Moldovan (64)	Aelenei (10), I. Dumitru (15), A. Iordănescu (66), M. Răducanu (p. 82)
9	22 May 1984	Final	Dinamo	Steaua	2–1	Custov (45), Orac (53)	Lăcătuș (10)
10	12 June 1985	Semi-finals	Steaua	Dinamo	5–0	Pițurcă (27, 50), Lăcătuș (35, 61), Balint (64)	—
11	25 June 1986	Final	Dinamo	Steaua	1–0	M. Damaschin (71)	—
12	28 June 1987	Final	Steaua	Dinamo	1–0	Bölöni (25)	—
13	26 June 1988	Final	Steaua	Dinamo	2–1	Lăcătuș (27), Balint (90)	Răducioiu (87)
14	29 June 1989	Final	Steaua	Dinamo	1–0	Hagi (67)	—
15	2 May 1990	Final	Dinamo	Steaua	6–4	Răducioiu (3, 42, 82), Mateuț (39), Sabău (47), Lupu (56)	I. Dumitrescu (22), Lăcătuș (68), I. Rotariu (70), N. Ungureanu (85)
16	13 March 1996	Quarter-finals	Dinamo	Steaua	0–1	—	Gâlcă (79)
17	14 April 1999	Semi-finals, 1st leg	Dinamo	Steaua	1–2	Lupescu (p. 26)	Roșu (60), Dănciulescu (70)
18	5 May 1999	Semi-finals, 2nd leg	Steaua	Dinamo	3–1	Dănciulescu (8), Luțu (57, 61)	Vlădoiu (86)
19	24 April 2002	Semi-finals, 1st leg	Steaua	Dinamo	0–1	—	Cl. Niculescu (75)
20	8 May 2002	Semi-finals, 2nd leg	Dinamo	Steaua	3–1	Cl. Niculescu (47), Cl. Drăgan (59), Vl. Munteanu (82)	Cl. Răducanu (13)
21	27 November 2002	Last 16	Steaua	Dinamo	0–3	—	Fl. Petre (23), Stoican (67), Vl. Munteanu (74)
22	25 May 2011	Final	Dinamo	Steaua	1–2	Torje (33)	Dică (24), Bărboianu (o.g. 51)
23	27 March 2014	Semi-finals, 1st leg	Steaua	Dinamo	5–2	Latovlevici (22), Varela (39), Chipciu (43), C. Tănase (45+2), Keșerü (76)	D. Rotariu (32), Lazăr (53)
24	17 April 2014	Semi-finals, 2nd leg	Dinamo	Steaua	1–1	C. Matei (86)	C. Tănase (22)
25	3 March 2016	Semi-finals, 1st leg	Dinamo	Steaua	0–0	—	—
26	20 April 2016	Semi-finals, 2nd leg	Steaua	Dinamo	2–2	Enache (17), Chipciu (52)	Ekeng (51), Puljić (75)
27	25 June 2020	Semi-finals, 1st leg	Dinamo	FCSB	0–3	—	Popa (32), Olaru (75), Dumitru (82)
28	8 July 2020	Semi-finals, 2nd leg	FCSB	Dinamo	1–0	A. Petre (2)	—
29	10 February 2021	Last 16	Dinamo	FCSB	1–0	Nemec (55)	—
30	30 October 2024	Group Stage	Dinamo	FCSB	0–4	—	Băluță (56), Phelipe (70), Ștefănescu (81, 88)

=== Romanian SuperCup (Supercupa României) ===
#	Date	Home team	Away team	Score	Goals (home)	Goals (away)
1	2 March 2002	Steaua	Dinamo	2–1 (1–0)	Trică (30, 86)	Cl. Niculescu (71)
2	31 July 2005	Steaua	Dinamo	2–3 (2–1)	Dică (15), Iacob (44)	Bratu (38), Bălțoi (69), Cl. Niculescu (84)

=== League Cup (Cupa Ligii) ===
#	Date	Level	Home team	Score	Away team	Goals (home)	Goals (away)
1	22 Decembrie 2016	Semi-finals, 1st leg	Dinamo	4–1 (1–0)	Steaua	Mahlangu (19) Nistor (65) Lazăr (79) Rotariu (90)	Aganović (78)
2	1 March 2017	Semi-finals, 2nd leg	Steaua	1–3 (0–1)	Dinamo	Alibec (63 p.)	Nistor (36) Petre (74) Hanca (81 p.)

== Head-to-head ranking in Liga I ==
P.	49	50	51	52	53	54	55	56	58	59	60	61	62	63	64	65	66	67	68	69	70	71	72	73	74	75	76	77	78	79	80	81	82	83	84	85	86	87	88	89	90	91	92	93	94	95	96	97	98	99	00	01	02	03	04	05	06	07	08	09	10	11	12	13	14	15	16	17	18	19	20	21	22	23	24	25	26
1			1	1	1		1	1			1	1	1	1	1	1			1			1		1		1	1	1	1				1	1	1	1	1	1	1	1	1		1	1	1	1	1	1	1		1	1	1		1	1	1	1						1	1	1									1	1	
2			2	2	2	2		2	2	2		2		2				2		2					2		2	2		2	2	2			2	2		2	2	2	2	2	2	2						2		2		2	2	2		2	2								2	2	2	2		2	2	2			
3						3				3					3	3	3		3		3	3								3												3			3	3		3		3	3						3			3			3					3									
4																				4												4					4																4						4		4				4		4										4
5		5																5			5					5			5		5			5													5															5	5								5						
6	6						6		6															6	6								6																6					6						6	6	6		6												6	
7																							7																																											7			7								7
8	8	8									8																																																																		
9													9										9																																															9							
10																																																																													
11																																																																													
12																	12																																																							12					
13																																																																							13				13		
14																																																																									14				
15																																																																													
16																																																																													
Liga II
4																																																																										4			

Steaua București/FCSB
Dinamo București
- Total: Steaua București/FCSB finished higher 48 times, Dinamo București finished higher 29 times, and the clubs finished in the same position 0 times.

== Players who played for both teams ==
Only league matches. FC Steaua București's appearances and goals adds from official book.

Name	FCSB/Steaua			Dinamo		
Name	Period	Appearances	Goals	Period	Appearances	Goals
(Romania) Vlad Achim	2016–2018	25	1	2020–2021	29	1
(Romania) Marin Andrei	1968–1969	8	0	1970–1972	22	0
(Jordan) Tha'er Bawab	2016	8	1	2017–2018	13	0
(Romania) Cristian Bălgrădean	2018–2020	64	0	2010–2014	90	0
(Romania) Eric Bicfalvi	2007–2012	63	3	2016	7	1
(Romania) Valeriu Bordeanu	1999–2003	40	1	2010–2011	17	0
(Romania) Gabriel Boștină	2002–2007	96	17	2007–2010	73	2
(Romania) Bogdan Bucur	1991–1997	90	2	1986–1988		
(Romania) Iosif Bükössy	1956–1958	5	1	1958–1960	16	3
(Romania) Adrian Bumbescu	1984–1992	188	4	1980–1982	36	0
(Moldova) Cătălin Carp	2015–2016	9	0	2021–2022	13	2
(Romania) Augustin Călin	1996–1997	23	4	1997–1999	9	4
(Romania) Gheorghe Ceaușilă	1986	1	0	1995	10	6
(Romania) Narcis Coman	1970–1974	34	0	1968–1970	30	0
(Romania) Marius Coporan	1997–1999	21	0	1993–1997; 1999–2000	49	4
(Romania) Adrian Cristea	2013	9	1	2004–2010	161	26
(Romania) Andrei Cristea	2004–2006	52	10	2008–2010; 2012–2013	67	23
(Romania) Tiberiu Curt	2003–2005	18	1	2005–2006	7	2
(Romania) Ionel Dănciulescu	1998–2001	129	53	1995–1997; 2002–2009; 2010–2013	366	152
(Romania) Augustin Deleanu	1960–1963 (youth career)	0	0	1969–1976	178	7
(Romania) Anton Doboș	1991–1996	134	6	1989–1991	47	2
(Romania) Florian Dumitrescu	1974–1975	29	2	1971–1974	66	15
(Romania) Alexandru Florea	1948–1949	4	1	1951–1953		
(Romania) Ionel Fulga	1992–1994	23	2	1990–1991; 1995–1996	26; 28	3; 2
(Romania) George Galamaz	2010–2011	19	0	2004–2006	41	0
(France) Eddy Gnahoré	2026–	0	0	2024–2026	87	6
(France) Harlem Gnohéré	2017–2020	92	41	2015–2017	45	17
(Romania) Răzvan Grădinaru	2013–2016	6	0	2022	11	0
(Romania) Daniel Iftodi	1992–1994	22	5	1998–2000	59	13
(Romania) Sabin Ilie	1995–1997; 1999–2000	69	36	2001	7	3
(Romania) Gheorghe Lăzăreanu	1947–1948	10	0	1948–1949	7	0
(Romania) Valentin Lemnaru	2014	0	0	2006–2009	1	0
(Romania) Srdjan Luchin	2014–2015	9	0	2011–2014	66	2
(Romania) Ciprian Marica	2016	7	0	2001–2004	23	4
(Romania) Andrei Marc	2019	2	0	2015–2016	37	2
(Romania) Adrian Matei	1997–1999	65	3	1989–1993	63	2
(Romania) Cosmin Matei	2010–2011	5	0	2012–2016; 2021–2022	129	22
(Romania) Damian Militaru	1994–1999	139	21	1993–1994	25	6
(Romania) Cornel Mirea	1991–1992	23	1	1990; 1995	21	0
(Romania) Dumitru Moraru	1974–1978	84	0	1981–1989	212	0
(Romania) Cătălin Munteanu	1996–1998	45	22	2005–2008; 2010–2014	156	12
(Romania) Dorinel Munteanu	2003–2005; 2008	32	2	1991–1993	67	27
(Romania) Alexandru Musi	2021–2025	32	3	2025–	4	2
(Romania) Doru Nicolae	1973–1974	1	0	1975–1976	6	0
(Romania) Radu Niculescu	2000–2001; 2003	9	4	1994	3	0
(Romania) Daniel Oprița	2002–2007	107	15	2007	5	0
(Romania) Alexandru Păcurar	2010	6	1	2004–2006	14	1
(Romania) Gheorghe Pena	1988–1991	19	7	1991–1992		
(Romania) Adrian Pitu	2003–2004	24	3	1997–1998	4	0
(Romania) Mihăiță Pleșan	2007–2010	40	3	2005	12	2
(Romania) Dennis Politic	2025-	2	0	2023-2025	56	12
(Romania) Daniel Popa	2024–2025	15	0	2016–2021	92	14
(Romania) Constantin Titi Popescu	1953	2	0	1950–1951		
(Romania) Gheorghe Popescu	1988	13	1	2002	8	0
(Romania) Mihai Popescu	2024–	0	0	2013–2020	63	5
(Romania) Cristian Pușcaș	1996–1997	5	0	1993–1995	36	5
(Romania) Dorin Rotariu	2023	5	0	2012–2017	122	22
(Romania) Iulian Roșu	2011–2014	1	0	2022–		
(Portugal) Diogo Salomão	2019–2020	3	0	2017–2019	55	15
(Romania) Ion Sburlea	1991–1993	27	1	1995	15	0
(Romania) Stere Sertov	1980–1982	18	2	1982–1983	3	0
(Romania) Florian Simion	1991–1992	6	0	1997		
(Romania) Deian Sorescu	2023	18	2	2018–2022	123	27
(Romania) Bogdan Stelea	1995–1997	47	0	1986; 1987–1991; 2004–2005	111	0
(Romania) Dorel Stoica	2010	5	1	2011–2012	10	1
(Romania) Cătălin Straton	2020–2022	6	0	2019–2020	12	0
(Romania) Dennis Șerban	1996–1998	62	15	2004; 2006–2007	10	2
(Romania) Gabriel Tamaș	2015–2016	41	1	2002–2003; 2004–2005; 2008–2009	80	7
(Romania) Florin Tene	1998–1999	13	0	1986–1987; 1991–1992; 1994–1995; 2000–2001	57	0
(Romania) Andrei Toma	1980–1982	17	0	1978–1980		
(Romania) Radu Troi	1975–1979	87	17	1969–1970	0	0
(Romania) Alexandru Tudose	2005–2006; 2008–2010	10	0	2013	5	0
(Romania) Viorel Turcu	1982–1983; 1986–1987	25	5	1983–1984	11	2
(Romania) George Țucudean	2015	17	3	2010–2013; 2013–2014	74	18
(Romania) Ion Vlădoiu	1990–1993; 1995–1996; 2000–2001	122	60	1998–1999	36	26
(Romania) Dorel Zamfir	1982	8	2	1980–1982	27	2

== Managers who coached both teams ==
^{1} – still an active manager

Name	Steaua/FCSB	Dinamo
Name	Period	Period
Coloman Braun-Bogdan	1948	1948
Constantin Cernăianu	1981–1983	1985
Florin Halagian	1984	1991–1994
Traian Ionescu	1981	1970–1971
Dorinel Munteanu ^{1}	2008	2012
Angelo Niculescu	1958	1953; 1954; 1955–1957; 1964–1965; 1965–1966; 1979–1980
Valentin Stănescu	1971–1972	1981–1982
Colea Vâlcov	1948–1949	1954
Walter Zenga ^{1}	2004–2005	2007

== See also ==
- Derbiul Bucureștiului
- Steaua București football records dispute
- List of sports rivalries
