= Mircea Onisemiuc =

Romanian footballer

Personal information
- Date of birth: 13 September 1970 (age 56)
- Place of birth: Constanța, Romania
- Height: 1.76 m (5 ft 9 in)
- Position: Forward

Senior career*
Years	Team	Apps	(Gls)
1998–1999	Rot-Weiß Oberhausen	6	(0)
1999–2000	VfB Oldenburg		
2000–2002	1. FC Lok Stendal		
2004–2005	SV Straelen		

Managerial career
- 2006–2007: KFC Uerdingen 05 U19
- 2007–2008: GSV Moers (assistant)
- 2008–2009: DJK Germania Gladbeck
- 2013–2014: MSV Duisburg U19 (assistant)
- 2014–2016: Schwarz-Weiß Essen
- 2016: Rot Weiss Ahlen
- 2017: SSVg Velbert
- 2018–2019: MSV Duisburg U15
- * Club domestic league appearances and goals

Mircea Onisemiuc (born 13 September 1970) is a Romanian football manager and former player.

A forward, he played six games in the 2. Bundesliga for Rot-Weiß Oberhausen before joining Regionalliga team VfB Oldenburg in 1999, then Oberliga team 1. FC Lok Stendal and Verbandsliga team SV Straelen.

Embarking on a coaching career, he managed Schwarz-Weiß Essen, Rot Weiss Ahlen, SSVg Velbert and MSV Duisburg's youth team.
