= Emanoil Hașoti =

Romanian footballer and manager

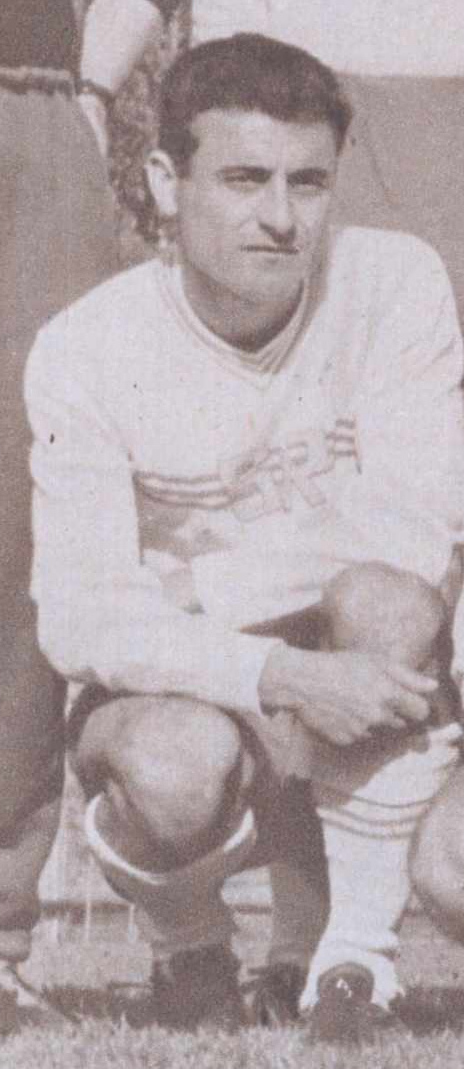
- Emanoil Hașoti 1965

Personal information
- Date of birth: 14 September 1932
- Place of birth: Kavarna, Kingdom of Romania
- Date of death: 3 July 1993 (aged 60)
- Place of death: Constanța, Romania
- Height: 1.67 m (5 ft 6 in)
- Position: Forward

Senior career*
Years	Team	Apps	(Gls)
1950–1952	Recolta Mangalia		
1952–1953	Ș.N. Constanța		
1953–1955	Independența Sibiu		
1955–1966	Steagul Roșu Brașov (Note: The statistics for the 1955, 1956 Divizia B seasons are unavailable and the statistics for the 1957 unofficial championship called Cupa Primăverii are not taken into consideration.)	194	(32)

International career
1959–1961	Romania	5 (Note: Including 2 appearances for Romania's Olympic team)	(0)

Managerial career
- 1968–1969: Portul Constanța
- 1970–1972: Farul Constanța (assistant)
- 1972–1975: FC Constanța
- 1980–1982: FC Constanța
- 1987: Unirea Slobozia
- 1987–1988: FC Constanța
- 1991: Farul Constanța
- * Club domestic league appearances and goals

Emanoil Hașoti (14 September 1932 – 3 July 1993) was a Romanian football forward and a manager.

== Club career ==
Hașoti was born on 14 September 1932, in Kavarna, Kingdom of Romania, to a family of Aromanians who were forced to leave the town in 1940, following the Treaty of Craiova, which allowed the Kingdom of Bulgaria to retake the Southern Dobruja area. His family then settled in Mangalia, where in 1950 at the age of 20, Hașoti began playing amateur-level football for local club Recolta. However, after two years, several families, including his, were ordered to relocate from Mangalia, and they chose to go to Sibiu, but Hașoti was still able to play for Ș.N. Constanța between 1952 and 1953. One year later, Sibiu was set as a mandatory residence for his family, compelling Hașoti to play football only within the city, at Independența. In 1954, the decision of displacement and forced residence was lifted, allowing Hașoti's family and relatives to return home but he remained at Independența until 1955 when coach Silviu Ploeșteanu brought him to Steagul Roșu Brașov in Divizia B. He helped the team get promoted to Divizia A, a competition in which he made his debut on 25 August 1957 in a 4–3 away victory against Locomotiva București. He remained at Steagul until the end of his career, the highlights of this period being a second place in the 1959–60 season and the winning of the 1960–61 Balkans Cup in which he played all the minutes in all the games. Hașoti also played seven matches and scored once in the Inter-Cities Fairs Cup over the course of two seasons. Most notably in the 1965–66 edition he scored once in a 1–0 win over NK Zagreb which helped his side get past the first round, but they got eliminated in the following one by Espanyol Barcelona, despite managing a 4–2 victory in one of the games. Hașoti made his last Divizia A appearance on 8 May 1966 in a 2–0 loss to Farul Constanța, totaling 194 matches with 32 goals in the competition and 11 games with one goal in the Balkans Cup.

== International career ==
Hașoti played three games for Romania, making his debut under coach Augustin Botescu in a 2–0 away loss to Czechoslovakia in the 1960 European Nations' Cup qualifiers. His other two matches for the national team were victories in friendlies against Turkey. Hașoti also played two games for Romania's Olympic team.

== Managerial career ==
Hașoti started his coaching career at Steagul Roșu Brașov where he coached juniors. In 1968 he became head coach at Divizia B team, Portul Constanța, moving to Farul Constanța in the middle of the 1969–70 Divizia A season where he worked as an assistant of Robert Cosmoc. After two and a half years as Cosmoc's assistant, he became head coach for the 1972–73 Divizia A season in which the club finished in 8th place and in the following season he helped them finish in the fourth position. He was Farul's coach on several occasions, helping the club earn two promotions from Divizia B to Divizia A. Notably, Hașoti is known as the coach who in 1982 gave Gheorghe Hagi his debut in professional football. He also coached at Farul's youth center and for half a year he was coach at Divizia B club, Unirea Slobozia. Hașoti has a total of 196 Divizia A games as a manager, all of them at Farul, consisting of 68 victories, 46 draws and 82 losses.

== Death ==
Hașoti died on 3 July 1993 at age 60 in his home in Constanța.

== Honours ==
=== Player ===
FC Brașov

- Divizia A runner-up: 1959–60
- Divizia B: 1956
- Balkans Cup: 1960–61

=== Manager ===
Farul Constanța

- Divizia B: 1980–81, 1987–88
