= Stadionul Portul =

Stadium in Romania

- Interactive map of Stadionul Portul
- Address: Bulevardul 1 Mai
- Location: Constanța, Romania
- Coordinates: 44°09′50.7″N 28°38′02.6″E
- Owner: Port of Constanța
- Operator: Portul Constanța
- Capacity: 10,000 (0 seats)
- Surface: Grass

Construction
- Opened: 1970s
- Renovated: 2023
- Closed: 2020–2023

Tenant
- Portul Constanța (1970–2020, 2024–present)

Stadionul Portul is a multi-purpose stadium in Constanța, Romania, situated inside the Port of Constanța. It is currently used mostly for football matches and is the home ground of Portul Constanța, team of the Port and has a capacity of 10,000 people on terraces. The stadium was opened during the 1970s, replacing the old 8th May Stadium, legendary stadium of Constanța, opened in 1948.

Between 2020 and 2023, the stadium was closed for sports competitions and was used as a Modular Hospital during the COVID-19 pandemic. It was re-opened in 2023 and needed some renovation works.
