= Mihai Stere (footballer, born 1968) =

Romanian footballer

Personal information
- Date of birth: 31 August 1968 (age 58)
- Place of birth: Constanța, Romania
- Height: 1.75 m (5 ft 9 in)
- Position: Midfielder

Youth career
- 1977–1985: Farul Constanța

Senior career*
| Years | Team | Apps | (Gls) |
| 1985–1987 | Farul Constanța | | |
| 1987–1988 | Victoria București | 22 | (1) |
| 1988–1989 | Flacăra Moreni | | |
| 1990–1993 | Farul Constanța | | |
| 1993–1994 | Argeș Pitești | | |
| 1994–1996 | Portul Constanța | | |
| 1996–1998 | SV Obermarsberg Eresburg | | |
- * Club domestic league appearances and goals

Mihai Stere (born 31 August 1968) is a Romanian former footballer who played as a midfielder. Throughout his career, he played for clubs such as Farul Constanța, Victoria București, Flacăra Moreni, Argeș Pitești, Portul Constanța, ending his playing days at SV Obermarsberg Eresburg in the German fifth division, Landesliga Niederrhein, where he also coached a group of 9–10-year-old children.

After retiring in 1998, he devoted himself to business before returning to football as a coach at Gheorghe Hagi Football Academy.

== Club career ==
Born in Constanța, Stere joined the Farul Constanța youth sector in 1977, at the age of 9. He later represented Romania’s youth and Olympic teams, serving as captain on several occasions. Among his teammates were notable players such as Ilie Dumitrescu, Ionuț Lupescu, Florin Prunea, Sorin Tufan, Constantin Stănici, Bănică Oprea, and Ioan Uleșan.

He made his Divizia A debut on 23 August 1987 for Victoria București, under coach Nicolae Dumitru, in a 1–1 away draw against Politehnica Timișoara, where he played 22 matches and scored 1 goal during the 1987–88 season.
