= DJK Germania Gladbeck =

German football club

Germania Gladbeck
- Full name: Deutsche Jugendkraft Germania Gladbeck 1923 e.V.
- Founded: 1923
- Dissolved: 2010
- Ground: Stadion Gladbeck
- Capacity: 37,612
- League: defunct

DJK Germania Gladbeck was a German association football club based in Gladbeck, North Rhine-Westphalia.

== History ==
The club was established in 1923 and following a second-place finish in the Verbandsliga Westfalen (V) in 2007 was promoted to the Oberliga Westfalen, the fourth tier.

In the 2008–2009 season they were coached by Mircea Onisemiuc.

The club experienced financial difficulties, became insolvent and was dissolved in early 2010. It was succeeded by a new club, DJK Alemmannia Gladbeck.

== Stadium ==
The club played its home matches in the Stadion Gladbeck in the Sportplatz Krusenkamp. The facility has a capacity of 37,612.
