= Ayana (name) =

- Gender: Female (generally); Unisex (Kongo)

Origin
- Origin: Sanskrit (Hindu), Sinhalese (Sri Lankan) Japanese, Kikongo, Oromo, Turkish, Hebrew, Amharic
- Meaning: Varies by culture

Other names
- Alternative spelling: Ayana

Ayana is a name known in several unrelated languages around the world, including Sanskrit (Hindi), Sinhalese (Sri Lankan), Amharic, Hebrew, Japanese, Kikongo, Oromo, and Turkish. Despite being rooted in Sanskrit religious text the name has a universal appeal as the soft melodic sound crosses international borders.

== Sanskrit (Hindi) ==
Deeply rooted in Indian culture and religious texts, the name often reflects the concept of the soul's spiritual journey or the changing seasons in life.

Sanskrit (Hindu origin): Means "path," "a good path," or "positive direction". In spiritual contexts, it symbolizes the path of life, personal growth, and the journey of the soul.

- Ramayana (रामायणI): Derived from Rama + ayana. It translates to "The path/journey of Rama".
- Narayana (नारायणI): Derived from Nara (water) + ayana. It means "The one who rests on the cosmic waters" or "The home of all mankind".
- Mahabharata / Bharatayana (भारतायनI): The path or history of the Bharata dynasty.
- Devayana (देवयानI): The "path of the gods" (often mentioned in the Upanishads representing a spiritual journey).

In the context of the Hindu calendar, it refers to the Sun's apparent movement across the sky during the year. It is essentially a division of the solar year into two halves based on the Sun's position relative to the equator.

== Sinhalese origin ==
In the Sri Lankan Sinhalese context, the name is distinctively masculine and is interpreted through two primary etymological pathways:

- Producer of wealth: The name is a compound derived from the Sinhala terms aya (අය), meaning income, revenue, or wealth, and na (න), denoting a producer, maker, or creator. Combined, the name translates to "one who produces income" or "the bringer of prosperity," symbolizing a provider.
- Cosmic traveler: In traditional Sinhala literature and cosmological contexts, ayana signifies a grand journey or orbit. It carries the poetic and profound meaning of "a person who travels around the universe" or a celestial explorer.

== Amharic ==
In Ethiopian culture, the name Ayana means beautiful flower in Amharic.

== Hebrew ==
The Hebrew name Ayana is a variant of Maayan, meaning fountain or spring.

== Japanese ==
Ayana (あやな, アヤナ) is a feminine Japanese given name which can be written using different kanji with different meanings:

- 彩菜, "colorful, greens"
- 彩那, "colorful, what"
- 彩名, "colorful, name"
- 綾奈, "design, what"
- 朱菜, "vermilion, greens"

The name can also be written in either hiragana or katakana.

== Turkish ==
In Turkish language it means moon mother; ay means moon, ana means mother.

== Kikongo ==
Ayana (Ah-yah-nah or Ay-yah-nah) is a unisex Bakongo name that means "they protected" or "they supported" in the Kongo language. Those who bear the name can be found in northwest Angola, southwest Democratic Republic of Congo, and among the African diaspora in the Americas.

== People ==
- Ayana (彩菜), Japanese singer-songwriter
- Ayana Aberu Mulisa (born 2000) Ethiopian long-distance runner
- Ayana Akli (born 2001), American tennis player
- Ayana Aoyagi (青柳 彩奈; born 2000), Australian soccer player
- Ayana Evans, African-American performance artist and educator
- Ayana Gempei (源平 彩南; born 1996), Japanese freestyle wrestler
- Ayana Gray (born 1993), American author of young adult fiction
- Ayana Holloway Arce, American physicist
- Ayana V. Jackson (born 1977), American photographer and filmmaker
- Ayana Elizabeth Johnson (born 1980 or 1981), American marine biologist
- Ayana Jordan, American addiction psychiatrist
- Ayana Kashiwa (柏 綾菜; born 2005), Japanese member of the Super Girls (Japanese group)
- Ayana Onozuka (小野塚 彩那; born 1988), Japanese freestyle skier
- Ayana Russell (born 1988), Trinidad and Tobago footballer
- Ayana Sakai (酒井 彩名; born 1985), Japanese actress
- Ayana Shahab (アヤナ; born 1997), Japanese-Indonesian singer
- Ayana Siriwardhana (born 1999), Sri Lankan cricketer
- Ayana Taketatsu (竹達 彩奈; born 1989), Japanese voice actress
- Ayana Tsubaki (椿 彩奈; born 1984), Japanese transgender TV personality
- Ayana Walker (born 1979), American basketball player
- Ayana Zholdas (born 2001), Kazakhstani freestyle skier
- Almaz Ayana (born 1991) Ethiopian long-distance runner
- Dawud Ibsa Ayana (born 1952), Ethiopian political figure and militant
- Gizealew Ayana (born 2003), Ethiopian long-distance runner
- Yuniko Ayana (綾奈 ゆにこ), Japanese anime screenwriter and manga author.

== See also ==
- Ayanna, a given name
