= List of Philippine records in athletics =

The following are the national records in athletics in the Philippines maintained by country's national athletics federation: Philippine Amateur Track and Field Association (PATAFA).

== Outdoor ==
Key to tables: Awaiting ratification Record not kept by PATAFA Not ratified or later rescinded by PATAFA

=== Men ===
| Event | Record | Athlete | Date | Meet | Place | Ref. |
|---|---|---|---|---|---|---|
| 100 m | 10.25 (±0.0 m/s) | Eric Cray | 9 June 2015 | Southeast Asian Games | Kallang, Singapore | |
| 200 m | 20.84 (+0.1 m/s) | Trenten Beram | 23 August 2017 | Southeast Asian Games | Bukit Jalil, Malaysia | |
| 400 m | 45.57 | Isidro del Prado | 1 December 1984 | ASEAN Cup | Manila, Philippines | |
| 800 m | 1:47.52 | Carter Lilly | 19 April 2019 | Bryan Clay Invitational | Los Angeles, United States | |
| 1500 m | 3:40.87 | Yacine Guermali | 14 July 2024 | Meeting Sport e Solidarietà Lignano | Lignano Sabbiadoro, Italy | |
| 3000 m | 7:51.19 | Yacine Guermali | 9 July 2024 | Gyulai István Memorial | Székesfehérvár, Hungary | |
| 5000 m | 13:33.13 | Yacine Guermali | 9 June 2024 | Portland Track Festival | Portland, United States | |
| 5 km (road) | 16:11+ | Sonny Wagdos | 1 March 2026 | Tokyo Marathon | Tokyo, Japan | |
| 10,000 m | 29:02.36 | Eduardo Buenavista | 7 October 2002 | Asian Games | Busan, South Korea | |
| 10 km (road) | 32:11+ | Sonny Wagdos | 1 March 2026 | Tokyo Marathon | Tokyo, Japan | |
| 15 km (road) | 48:09+ | Sonny Wagdos | 1 March 2026 | Tokyo Marathon | Tokyo, Japan | |
| 20 km (road) | 1:04:05+ | Sonny Wagdos | 1 March 2026 | Tokyo Marathon | Tokyo, Japan | |
| Half marathon | 1:02:58 | Eduardo Buenavista | 6 July 2008 | | Manila, Philippines | |
| 25 km (road) | 1:19:55+ | Sonny Wagdos | 1 March 2026 | Tokyo Marathon | Tokyo, Japan | |
| 30 km (road) | 1:35:49+ | Sonny Wagdos | 1 March 2026 | Tokyo Marathon | Tokyo, Japan | |
| Marathon | 2:14:37 | Sonny Wagdos | 1 March 2026 | Tokyo Marathon | Tokyo, Japan | |
| 110 m hurdles | 13.37 (+0.6 m/s) | John Cabang | 8 May 2024 | Philippine Championships | Pasig, Philippines | |
| 400 m hurdles | 48.98 | Eric Cray | 23 June 2016 | Meeting de Atletismo Madrid | Madrid, Spain | |
| 2000 m steeplechase | 5:45.72 | Hector Begeo | 18 March 1983 | Australian Junior Championships | Melbourne, Australia | |
| 3000 m steeplechase | 8:35.09 | Hector Begeo | 28 September 1988 | Olympic Games | Seoul, South Korea | |
| High jump | 2.23 m | Leonard Grospe | 12 June 2026 | Philippine Championships | New Clark City, Philippines | |
| Pole vault | 6.00 m | Ernest John Obiena | 10 June 2023 | Bergen Jump Challenge | Bergen, Norway | |
| Pole vault | 6.00 m | Ernest John Obiena | 26 August 2023 | World Championships | Budapest, Hungary | |
| Long jump | 8.08 m (±0.0 m/s) (Note: record set during decathlon competition) | Janry Ubas | 8 May 2023 | Southeast Asian Games | Phnom Penh, Cambodia | |
| Triple jump | 16.70 m (+0.8 m/s) | Mark Harry Diones | 1 April 2017 | Philippine Open Invitational Championships | Ilagan, Philippines | |
| Shot put | 20.40 m | William Morrison III | 22 June 2019 | Bloomington High Performance | Bloomington, United States | |
| Discus throw | 52.10 m | Fidel Repizo | 1 December 1991 | Southeast Asian Games | Manila, Philippines | |
| Discus throw | 54.14 m | Russel Je Ricaforte | August 2025 | PATAFA Weekly Relays | Pasig, Philippines | |
| Hammer throw | 68.66 m | Caleb Stuart | 13 March 2015 | Ben Brown Invitational | Fullerton, United States | |
| Javelin throw | 72.93 m | Danilo Fresnido | 17 December 2009 | Southeast Asian Games | Vientiane, Laos | |
| Decathlon | 7469 pts NWI | Aries Toledo | 14–15 May 2022 | Southeast Asian Games | Hanoi, Vietnam | |
| Decathlon | 100m (wind) / Long jump (wind) / Shot put / High jump / 400m / 110m H (wind) / Discus / Pole vault / Javelin / 1500m; 10.85 (+0.8 m/s) / 7.22 m (NWI) / 11.63 m / 1.86 m / 48.18 / 14.76 (+0.5 m/s) / 37.85 m / 4.20 m / 52.55 m / 4:36.15 | | | | | |
| 20 km walk (road) | 1:33:51 | Michael Embuedo | 11 May 2009 | | Lingayen, Philippines | |
| 50 km walk (road) | 4:22:38 | Saturnino Salazar | 19 May 1997 | | Lingayen, Philippines | |
| 4 × 100 m relay | 39.11 | Philippines; Anfernee Lopena; Archand Christian Bagsit; Eric Shauwn Cray; Trenten Beram | 25 August 2017 | Southeast Asian Games | Bukit Jalil, Malaysia | |
| 4 × 400 m relay | 3:04.89 | Philippines; Umajesty Williams; Frederick Ramirez; Joyme Sequita; Miguel del Prado | 4 October 2023 | Asian Games | Hangzhou, China | |
| 4 × 800 m relay | 7:42.20 | Philippines; Wenlie Maulas; Paul Billones; Christopher Ulboc; Mervin Guarte | 26 July 2014 | Vietnam Open | Ho Chi Minh City, Vietnam | |

=== Women ===
| Event | Record | Athlete | Date | Meet | Place | Ref. |
|---|---|---|---|---|---|---|
| 100 m | 11.27 (+1.5 m/s) | Kristina Knott | 29 August 2020 | Drake Blue Oval Meet | Des Moines, United States | |
| 200 m | 23.01 (±0.0 m/s) | Kristina Knott | 7 December 2019 | Southeast Asian Games | New Clark City, Philippines | |
| 400 m | 53.81 (Note: Outdoor best; indoor mark ratified as absolute record.) | Kayla Richardson | 14 April 2017 | Mt. SAC Relays | Torrance, United States | |
| 400 m | 52.10 | Naomi Johnson (Note: USA until 15 June 2026; eligible to represent PHI in National Representative Competitions from 3 June 2026) | 10 July 2026 | Asian U23 Championships | Ordos City, China | |
| 800 m | 2:06.24 | Naomi Marjorie Cesar | 20 June 2026 | Portland Track Festival | Portland, United States | |
| 800 m | 2:01:33 | Victoria Bossong (Note: USA until 30 June 2026; eligible to represent PHI in National Representative Competitions from 1 July 2026) | 10 July 2026 | Ed Murphey Classic | Memphis, United States | |
| 1500 m | 4:24.87 | Marietta Tabangin-Magno | 27 May 1989 | | Changhua, Taiwan | |
| 3000 m | 9:48.5 h | Marietta Tabangin-Magno | 27 April 1990 | | Manila, Philippines | |
| 5000 m | 16:40.81 | Mercedita Manipol | 10 December 2003 | Southeast Asian Games | Hanoi, Vietnam | |
| 5 km (road) | 18:09+ Mx | Artjoy Torregosa | 1 March 2026 | Tokyo Marathon | Tokyo, Japan | |
| 10,000 m | 34:40.3 h | Christabel Martes | 17 May 2001 | | Manila, Philippines | |
| 10 km (road) | 34:40 | Mercedita Manipol | 26 June 2005 | Jakarta International 10K | Jakarta, Indonesia | |
| 15 km (road) | 54:39+ Mx | Artjoy Torregosa | 1 March 2026 | Tokyo Marathon | Tokyo, Japan | |
| 20 km (road) | 1:12:52+ Mx | Artjoy Torregosa | 1 March 2026 | Tokyo Marathon | Tokyo, Japan | |
| Half marathon | 1:16:27.4 | Mary Joy Tabal | 28 May 2017 | Ottawa Half Marathon | Ottawa, Canada | |
| 25 km (road) | 1:30:42+ Mx | Artjoy Torregosa | 1 March 2026 | Tokyo Marathon | Tokyo, Japan | |
| 30 km (road) | 1:48:59+ Mx | Artjoy Torregosa | 1 March 2026 | Tokyo Marathon | Tokyo, Japan | |
| Marathon | 2:33:54 Mx | Artjoy Torregosa | 1 March 2026 | Tokyo Marathon | Tokyo, Japan | |
| 100 m hurdles | 13.34 (±0.0 m/s) | Lauren Hoffman (Note: USA until 30 September 2023; eligible to represent PHI from 1 October 2023) | 8 May 2024 | Philippine Championships | Pasig, Philippines | |
| 400 m hurdles | 56.44 | Robyn Lauren Brown | 17 May 2022 | Southeast Asian Games | Hanoi, Vietnam | |
| 400 m hurdles | 56.39 | Lauren Hoffman | 23 March 2024 | Hurricane Collegiate Invitational | Miami, United States | |
| 3000 m steeplechase | 10:22.49 | Jessica Barnard | 1 May 2016 | Payton Jordan Invitational | Palo Alto, United States | |
| High jump | 1.81 m | Narcisa Atienza | 14 August 2005 | | Pasig, Philippines | |
| Pole vault | 4.30 m | Natalie Uy | 16 July 2020 | Acadia Invitational | Greenville, United States | |
| Pole vault | 4.30 m | Natalie Uy | 16 June 2018 | Spanish Club Championships | Castellón de la Plana, Spain | |
| Pole vault | 4.30 m | Natalie Uy | 25 May 2021 | USATF Invitational | Prairie View, United States | |
| Long jump | 6.72 m (+0.8 m/s) | Marestella Sunang | 4 July 2016 | Kazakhstan Open | Almaty, Kazakhstan | |
| Triple jump | 12.72 m (+0.4 m/s) | Angel Carino | 29 November 2018 | UAAP | Pasig, Philippines | |
| Triple jump | 12.92 m (+1.3 m/s) | Marisa Kwiatkowski | 26 May 2018 | NCAA Division I West Preliminary Round | Sacramento, United States | |
| Shot put | 13.92 m | Consuela Lacusong | 22 June 1975 | | Cebu City, Philippines | |
| Discus throw | 54.71 m | Josephine de la Vina | 10 July 1971 | | Bakersfield, United States | |
| Hammer throw | 50.55 m | Loralie Sermona | 5 July 2013 | Asian Championships | Pune, India | |
| Hammer throw | 50.63 m | Shiloh Corrales-Nelson | 10 April 2021 | Triton Invitational | San Diego, United States | |
| Hammer throw | 53.78 m | Shiloh Corrales-Nelson | 30 April 2021 | Long Beach Throws/Jumps Fest | Long Beach, United States | |
| Javelin throw | 53.75 m | Geralyn Amandoron | 18 May 2001 | | Manila, Philippines | |
| Heptathlon | 5381 pts h NWI | Sarah Dequinan | 16–17 May 2022 | Southeast Asian Games | Hanoi, Vietnam | |
| Heptathlon | 100m H (wind) / High jump / Shot put / 200m (wind) / Long jump (wind) / Javelin / 800m; 14.44 (+0.7 m/s) / 1.62 m / 11.12 m / 25.2 h (NWI) / 5.75 m (NWI) / 43.09 m / 2:25.25 | | | | | |
| 5000 m walk (track) | 25:19.9 | Rosalie Quinto Demigo | 20 December 1992 | | Manila, Philippines | |
| 10,000 m walk (track) | 52:48.8 | Rosalie Quinto Demigo | 10 April 1993 | | Manila, Philippines | |
| 20 km walk (road) | 1:47:52 | Melinda Manahan | 23 September 2003 | Asian Championships | Manila, Philippines | |
| 4 × 100 m relay | 43.60 | Philippines; Jessica Laurance; Naomi Johnson; Lianne Pama; Zion Corrales Nelson | 28 September 2026 | Asian Games | Nagoya, Japan | |
| 4 × 400 m relay | 3:40.9 | Philippines; Elma Muros-Posadas; Perla Balatucan; Rhoda Sinoro; Lydia de Vega | 17 May 1993 | | Manila, Philippines | |
| 4 × 400 m relay | 3:37.75 | Philippines; Bernalyn Bejoy; Robyn Lauren Brown; Jessel Lumapas; Maureen Schrijvers | 12 May 2023 | Southeast Asian Games | Phnom Penh, Cambodia | |

=== Mixed ===
| Event | Record | Athlete | Date | Meet | Place | Ref. |
|---|---|---|---|---|---|---|
| 4 × 100 m relay | 41.67 | Philippines; Eloiza Luzon; Anfernee Lopena; Kristina Knott; Eric Cray | 8 December 2019 | Southeast Asian Games | New Clark City, Philippines | |
| 4 × 400 m relay | 3:19.68 | Philippines; Gabriel Borado; Victoria Bossong; Michael Del Prado; Naomi Johnson | 24 September 2026 | Asian Games | Nagoya, Japan | |

== Indoor ==
=== Men ===
| Event | Record | Athlete | Date | Meet | Place | Ref. |
|---|---|---|---|---|---|---|
| 50 m | 5.76 | Eric Cray | 27 January 2017 | | Saskatoon, Canada | |
| 55 m | 6.42 | Eric Cray | 30 January 2011 | | Gainesville, United States | |
| 60 m | 6.57 A | Eric Cray | 14 February 2015 | Don Kirby Open & Elite | Albuquerque, United States | |
| 60 m | 6.57 | Eric Cray | 19 February 2016 | Asian Championships | Doha, Qatar | |
| 200 m | 21.13 A | Umajesty Williams | 27 January 2023 | New Mexico Team Open | Albuquerque, United States | |
| 400 m | 46.77 | Trenten Beram | 4 March 2018 | ECAC & IC4A Championships | Boston, United States | |
| 600 m | 1:18.95 | Carter Lilly | 17 January 2020 | Larry Wieczorek Invitational | Iowa City, United States | |
| 800 m | 1:50.74 | Hussein Loraña | 6 February 2026 | Asian Championships | Tianjin, China | |
| 800 m | 1:49.17 OT | Carter Lily | 9 February 2019 | Iowa State Classic | Ames, United States | |
| 1000 m | 2:46.55 (Note: Mark was set during heptathlon competition.) | Jesson Ramil Cid | 16 February 2014 | Asian Championships | Hangzhou, China | |
| 1500 m | 4:04.76 | Mervin Guarte | 19 September 2017 | Asian Indoor and Martial Arts Games | Ashgabat, Turkmenistan | |
| Mile | 4:15.87 | Carter Lilly | 1 February 2020 | Black & Gold Invitational | Iowa City, United States | |
| Mile | 4:02.04 OT | Yacine Guermali | 27 January 2023 | UW Invite | Seattle, United States | |
| 2000 m | 5:09.91 | Yacine Guermali | 23 January 2026 | Hokie Invitational | Blacksburg, United States | |
| 3000 m | 8:12.41 OT | Yacine Guermali | 13 January 2023 | Spokane Indoor Challenge | Spokane, United States | |
| 5000 m | 13:33.99 | Yacine Guermali | 3 December 2022 | Sharon Colyear-Danville Season Opener | Boston, United States | |
| 60 m hurdles | 7.64 | John Cabang | 17 February 2024 | Asian Championships | Tehran, Iran | |
| High jump | 2.15 m | Leonard Grospe | 12 February 2023 | Asian Championships | Astana, Kazakhstan | |
| Pole vault | 5.93 m | Ernest John Obiena | 23 February 2024 | ISTAF Indoor | Berlin, Germany | |
| Long jump | 7.64 m A | Donovant Arriola | 6 February 2015 | | Albuquerque, United States | |
| Triple jump | | | | | | |
| Shot put | 20.21 m | William Morrison III | 8 February 2020 | Mayo Invitational | Notre Dame, United States | |
| Heptathlon | 5306 pts (Note: by official result source; 5246 pts by World Athletics source) | Janry Ubas | 11–12 February 2023 | Asian Championships | Astana, Kazakhstan | |
| Heptathlon | 60m / Long jump / Shot put / High jump / 60m H / Pole vault / 1000m; 7.10 / 7.66 m / 11.32 m / 2.00 m / 8.60 / 4.70 m / 3:22.49 | | | | | |
| 5000 m walk | | | | | | |
| 4 × 400 m relay | | | | | | |

=== Women ===
| Event | Record | Athlete | Date | Meet | Place | Ref. |
|---|---|---|---|---|---|---|
| 60 m | 7.26 | Kristina Knott | 31 January 2021 | American Track League #2 | Fayetteville, United States | |
| 200 m | 23.39 | Kristina Knott | 21 February 2025 | Arkansas Qualifier | Fayetteville, United States | |
| 400 m | 53.71 | Lauren Hoffman | 9 February 2024 | Tiger Paw Invitational | Clemson, United States | |
| 600 m | 1:30.33 | Lauren Hoffman | 19 January 2024 | Hokie Invitational | Blacksburg, United States | |
| 800 m | 2:13.44 OT | Jessica Barnard | 14 February 2014 | Husky Classic | Seattle, United States | |
| 1000 m | 3:06.39 | Natalia Quintero | 1 February 2020 | On Your Marks | Santa Barbara, United States | |
| 1500 m | 4:53.30 OT | Jessica Barnard | 13 February 2016 | Huskie Classic | Seattle, United States | |
| Mile | 4:53.30 OT | Jessica Barnard | 13 February 2016 | Husky Classic | Seattle, United States | |
| 3000 m | | | | | | |
| 60 m hurdles | 8.48 | Lauren Hoffman | 6 February 2026 | Camel City Sprints | Winston-Salem, United States | |
| 300 m hurdles | 42.70 | Robyn Lauren Brown | 1 February 2019 | El-Camino College Allcomers | Torrance, United States | |
| High jump | 1.60 m | Maureen Schrijvers | 5 April 2014 | Brent Allcomers | Biñan, Philippines | |
| Pole vault | 4.26 m | Natalie Uy | 1 March 2020 | KTCCCA Indoor State Pole Vault Challenge | Shelbyville, United States | |
| Long jump | 6.11 m | Elma Muros-Posadas | 11 March 1995 | World Championships | Barcelona, Spain | |
| Triple jump | 12.58 m | Marisa Kwiatkowski | 27 January 2018 | UW Preview | Seattle, United States | |
| Shot put | 13.07 m A | Shiloh Corrales-Nelson | 31 January 2020 | Mountain T's Invitational | Flagstaff, United States | |
| Weight throw | 19.52 m | Shiloh Corrales-Nelson | 17 February 2024 | Alex Wilson Invitational | Notre Dame, United States | |
| Pentathlon | | | | | | |
| Pentathlon | 60m H / High jump / Shot put / Long jump / 800m | | | | | |
| 3000 m walk | | | | | | |
| 4 × 400 m relay | | | | | | |
