= 2024 Berlin Marathon =

42.195 km (26.2 mi) race in Germany

50th Berlin Marathon
- Location: Berlin, Germany
- Dates: 29 September 2024 (21 months ago)
- Competitors: 54,280
- Website: https://www.bmw-berlin-marathon.com

Champions
- Men: Milkesa Mengesha (2:03:17)
- Women: Tigist Ketema (2:16:42)
- Wheelchair men: Marcel Hug (1:27:18)
- Wheelchair women: Catherine Debrunner (1:35:23)

The 2024 Berlin Marathon was the 50th edition of the annual marathon race in Berlin, held on Sunday, September 29, 2024. A Platinum Label marathon, it was the fourth of six World Marathon Majors events scheduled for 2024. A total of 54,280 runners completed the marathon making it the largest marathon in the world at that time. This record was later surpassed at the 2024 New York City Marathon which had 55,646 finishers.

Ethiopian runner Tigst Ketema won the women's race with a time of 2:16:42. Fellow Ethiopian runner Milkesa Mengesha won the men's race with a time of 2:03:17. Swiss wheelchair athletes Marcel Hug and Catherine Debrunner won their races with finish times of 1:27:18 and 1:35:23, respectively. This was Hug's ninth and Debrunner's third win.

== Competitors ==
Eliud Kipchoge set the world record at the time of 2:01:09 in winning the 2022 Berlin Marathon. Then, he won the following year at the 2023 Berlin Marathon, winning the event for the fifth time in a finishing time of 2:02:42. However, in 2024, for the first time in about a decade, neither Kipchoge nor his long-time Ethiopian competitor Kenenisa Bekele would be a part of the Berlin Marathon. Instead, top competitors going into the race included Tadese Takele of Ethiopia and Cybrian Kotut of Kenya. Near the end of the race, Milkesa Mengesha pulled away from Cybrian Kotut with the finish line in sight to win by 5 seconds.

Tigst Assefa won the 2023 Berlin Marathon setting the world record at the time of 2:11:53. Another top Ethiopian runner Tigist Ketema was the favorite going into the race with the fastest marathon time among race entrants. Ketema ran most of the race alone and finished the race near her personal best time in 2:16:42.

== Results ==
Results for the top ten in the running races and top three in the wheelchair races are listed below.

Men's race result
Position	Athlete	Nationality	Time
1st place, gold medalist(s)	Milkesa Mengesha	Ethiopia	2:03:17
2nd place, silver medalist(s)	Cybrian Kotut	Kenya	2:03:22
3rd place, bronze medalist(s)	Haymanot Alew	Ethiopia	2:03:31
4	Stephen Kiprop	Kenya	2:03:37
5	Hailemariyam Kiros	Ethiopia	2:04:35
6	Yohei Ikeda	Japan	2:05:12
7	Tadese Takele	Ethiopia	2:05:13
8	Kibrom Oqbe Ruesom	Eritrea	2:05:37
9	Enock Onchari	Kenya	2:05:53
10	Kindie Derseh Kassie	Ethiopia	2:05:54

Women's race result
Position	Athlete	Nationality	Time
1st place, gold medalist(s)	Tigist Ketema	Ethiopia	2:16:42
2nd place, silver medalist(s)	Mestawot Fikir	Ethiopia	2:18:48
3rd place, bronze medalist(s)	Bosena Mulatie	Ethiopia	2:19:00
4	Ayana Aberu Mulisa	Ethiopia	2:20:20
5	Ai Hosoda	Japan	2:20:31
6	Mizuki Matsuda	Japan	2:20:42
7	Calli Hauger-Thackery	United Kingdom	2:21:24
8	Yebregual Melese	Ethiopia	2:21:39
9	Fikrte Wereta	Ethiopia	2:23:23
10	Meseret Sisay Gola	Ethiopia	2:23:36

Wheelchair men's race result
Position	Athlete	Nationality	Time
1st place, gold medalist(s)	Marcel Hug	Switzerland	1:27:18
2nd place, silver medalist(s)	David Weir	United Kingdom	1:29:05
3rd place, bronze medalist(s)	Geert Schipper	Netherlands	1:30:33

Wheelchair women's race result
Position	Athlete	Nationality	Time
1st place, gold medalist(s)	Catherine Debrunner	Switzerland	1:35:23
2nd place, silver medalist(s)	Susannah Scaroni	United States	1:38:01
3rd place, bronze medalist(s)	Manuela Schar	Switzerland	1:41:14

== See also ==
- World Marathon Majors
- List of marathons races
- List of World Athletics Label marathon races
