= Sonny Wagdos =

Filipino long-distance runner

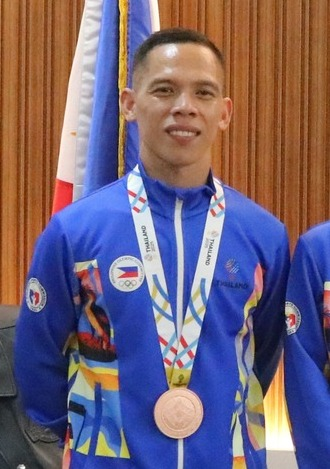
- Wagdos in 2026

Personal information
- National team: Philippines
- Born: July 3, 1993 (age 33) Prosperidad, Agusan del Sur, Philippines

Sport
- Sport: Athletics
- Events: 5,000 m, marathon

Achievements and titles
- Personal best: Marathon 2:14:32 (2026, NR)
Medal record
Men's athletics
Representing Philippines
SEA Games
Silver medal – second place	2023 Cambodia	5000 m
Bronze medal – third place	2019 Philippines	5000 m
Bronze medal – third place	2021 Vietnam	5000 m
Bronze medal – third place	2025 Thailand	5000 m

Sonny Wagdos (born July 3, 1993) is a Filipino long-distance runner. He is the holder of the Philippine national record in marathon.

== Early life and education ==
Wagdos was born on July 3, 1993, in Prosperidad, Agusan del Sur. He studied at the University of Mindanao in Davao City.

== Career ==
Wagdos started running as a University of Mindanao varsity scholar specializing in the 5,000 and 10,000-meter races.

Wagdos has frequently competed at the SEA Games winning medals in the 5,000-meter races. He won a bronze medal at the 2019, 2021, and 2025 editions; and a silver medal in the 2023 edition.

He first tried marathon at the 2024 Milo Marathon. Taking the discipline seriously, Wagdos trained under Eduardo Buenavista. His first "proper" race was the 2026 Tokyo Marathon. He set a new Philippine national record by clocking 2:14:32 breaking Buenavista's record set in the 2004 Beppu-Ōita Marathon.

== Personal life ==
Wagdos is an enlisted personnel at the Philippine Air Force with the rank of seargeant as of 2026.
