= Bosena Mulatie =

Ethiopian long-distance runner (born 2001)

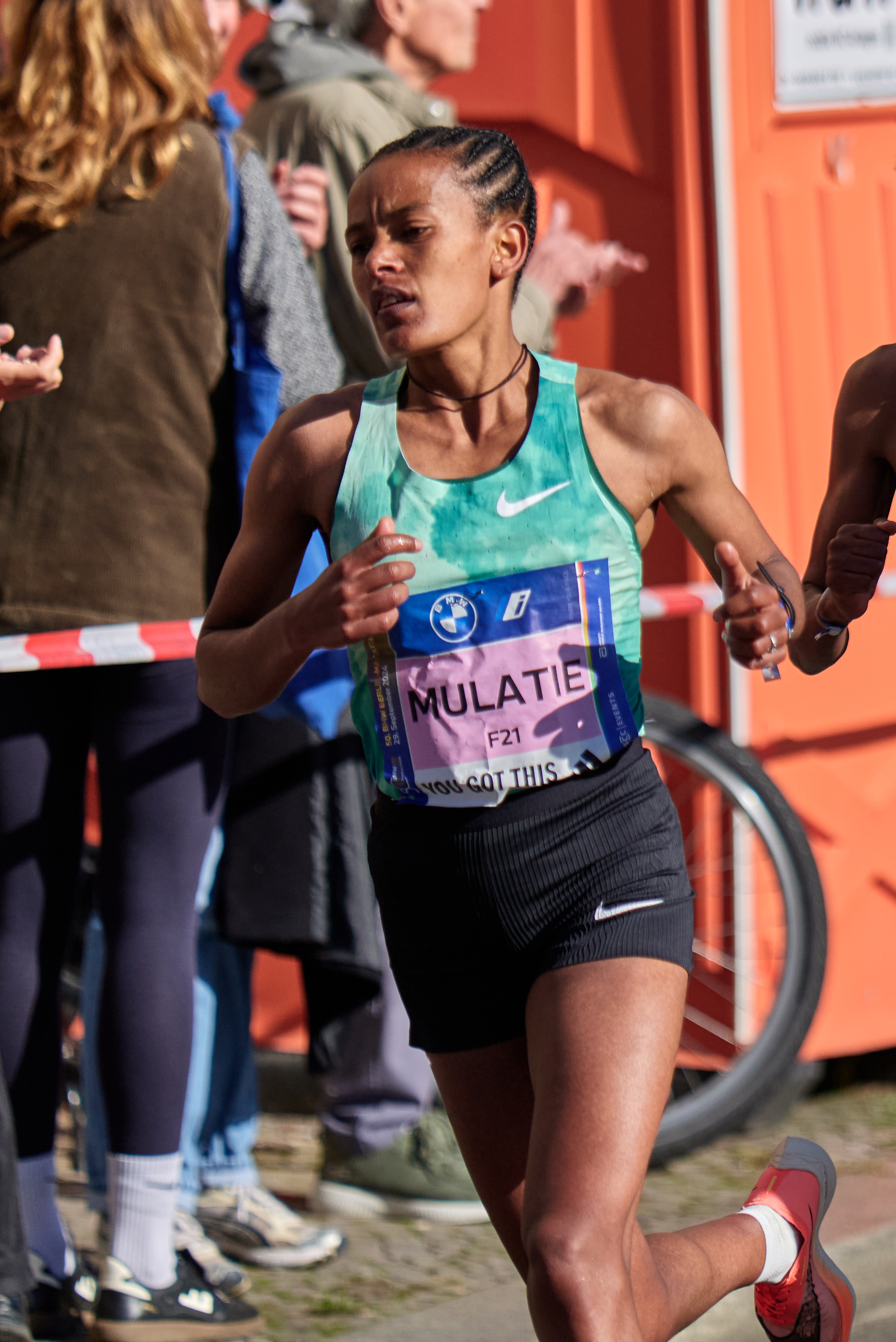

Personal information
- Nationality: Ethiopian
- Born: November 21, 2001 (age 24)

Sport
- Sport: Athletics
- Event(s): Long-distance running (5000 m, 10,000 m, Half Marathon, Marathon, 10K Road)
- Club: Amhara Maremiya
Medal record
World Marathon Majors
Bronze medal – third place	2024 Berlin	Marathon

Bosena Mulatie (born 21 November 2001) is an Ethiopian long-distance runner who competes in both track and road races, including the 5000 metres, 10,000 metres, half marathon, and marathon. She has gained international recognition for her performances, including a top-eight finish at the World Championships and a podium finish at the Berlin Marathon.

== Career ==
In 2020, Mulatie ran 30:50 in the 10K Road race in Valencia, Spain — a personal best at the time.

She set a personal best of 1:05:46 in the half marathon at the 2022 Ras Al Khaimah Half Marathon in the UAE. That same year, she competed in the 10,000 metres at the 2022 World Athletics Championships in Eugene, Oregon, finishing eighth with a lifetime best of 30:17.77.

In 2023, she ran 30:39.60 in the 10,000 metres at the Ethiopian World Championships Trials held in Nerja, Spain.

In 2024, Mulatie placed second at the EDP Lisbon Half Marathon in 1:09:00. On May 25, she set a new personal best in the 5000 metres, running 14:53.15 at the Prefontaine Classic (Eugene Diamond League) at Hayward Field in Eugene, Oregon.

She capped off the year with a third-place finish at the 2024 Berlin Marathon, setting a marathon personal best of 2:19:00. She ran much of the race alongside fellow Ethiopian Mestawot Fikir, contributing to an all-Ethiopian women's podium.

== Personal bests ==
As of May 2025, Mulatie's personal bests are:

- 5000 metres – 14:53.15 (Eugene, 2024)
- 10,000 metres – 30:17.77 (Eugene, 2022)
- 10K Road – 30:50 (Valencia, 2020)
- Half Marathon – 1:05:46 (Ras Al Khaimah, 2022)
- Marathon – 2:19:00 (Berlin, 2024)
