= Reims à Toutes Jambes =

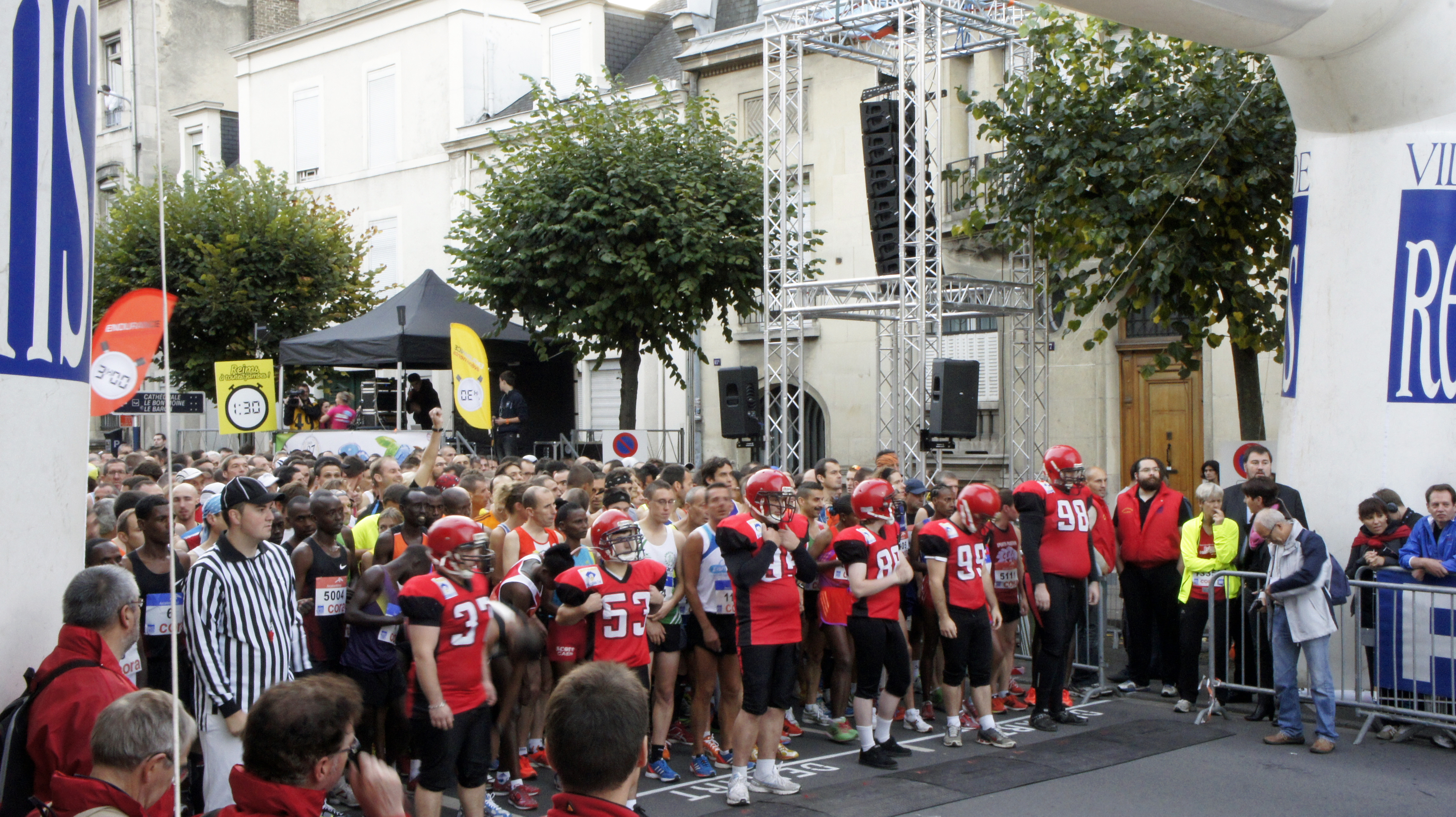
2012 Race

Reims à Toutes Jambes (English: Reims at Full Speed) is an annual road running event held in Reims, France in the month of October. First held in 1984, the competition comprises three main parts: a 42.195 km marathon, a 21.0975 km half marathon race, and a 10 km race. In addition to these, there are smaller competitions for disabled athletes and children. The marathon course is a figure-8 run twice and has hosted the French national championship race on three occasions (1997, 1999, 2000).

Both the marathon and the half marathon attract elite level competitors. The marathon course records are held by David Kemboi (2:07:53 hours) and Alla Zhilyaeva (2:27:38 hours). The best times for the half marathon are by Dieudonné Disi (1:01:13) and Christelle Daunay (1:08:34).

In 2015 the running festival was organized by the 'Run In' group along with Lyon and Marseille. It was rebranded 'Run In Reims'.

== List of winners ==
=== Marathon ===
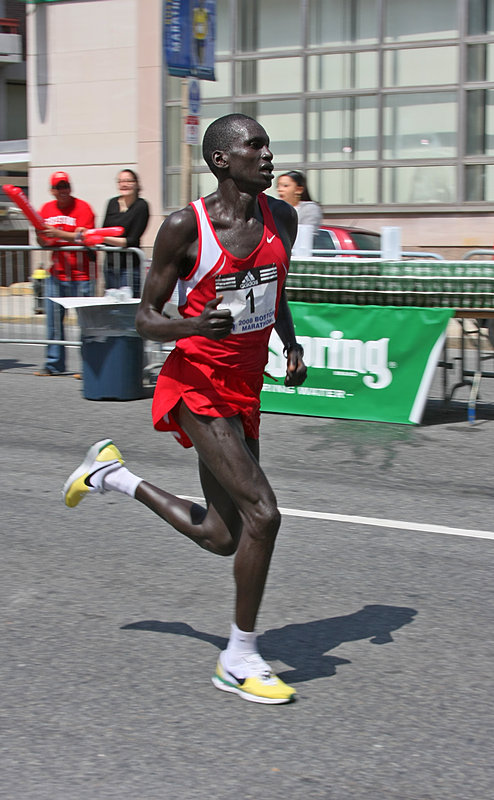
The 2001 winner Robert Kipkoech Cheruiyot has also won the Boston Marathon.

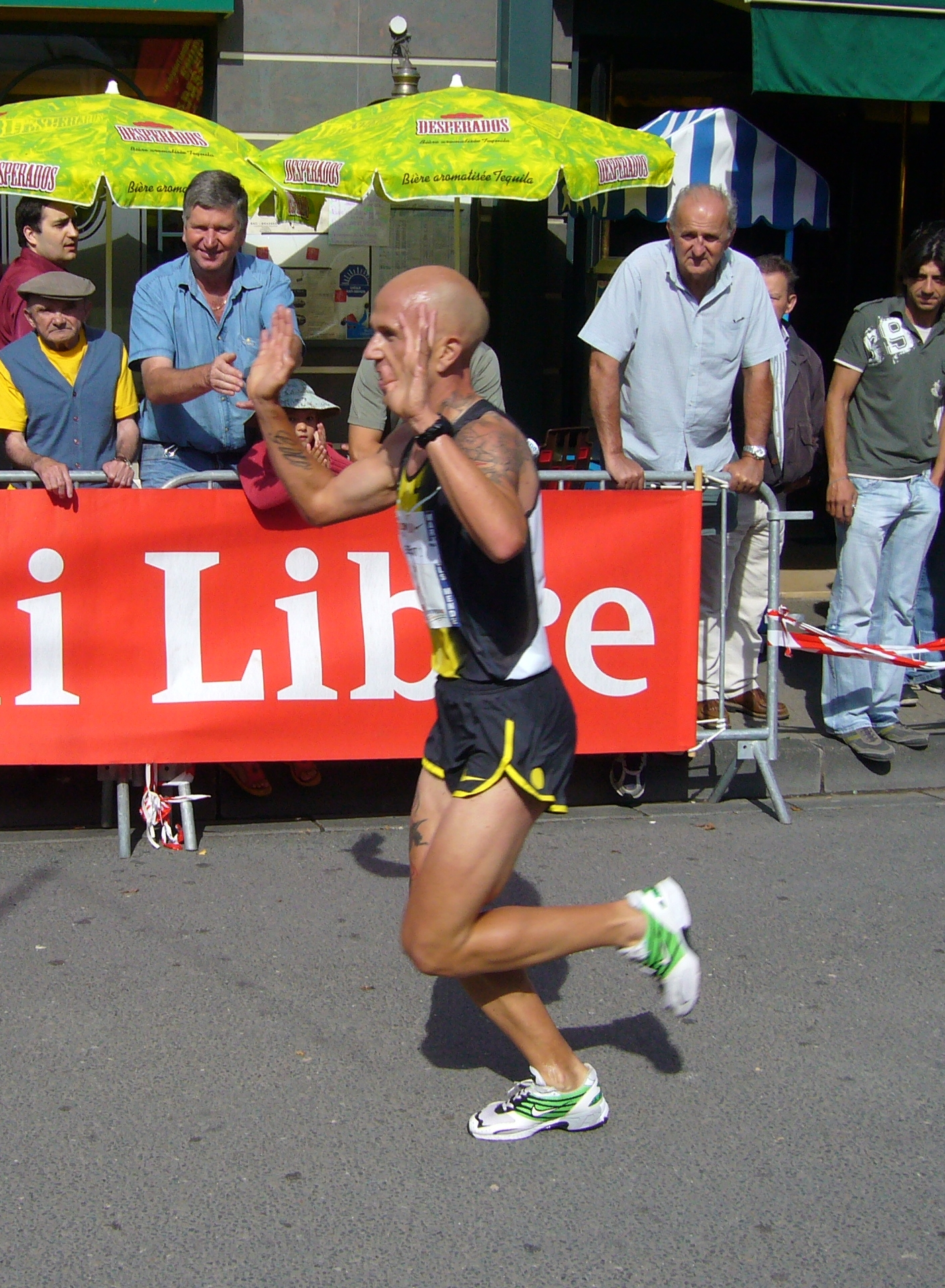
Frenchman Benoît Zwierzchiewski won the race and national title in 2000.

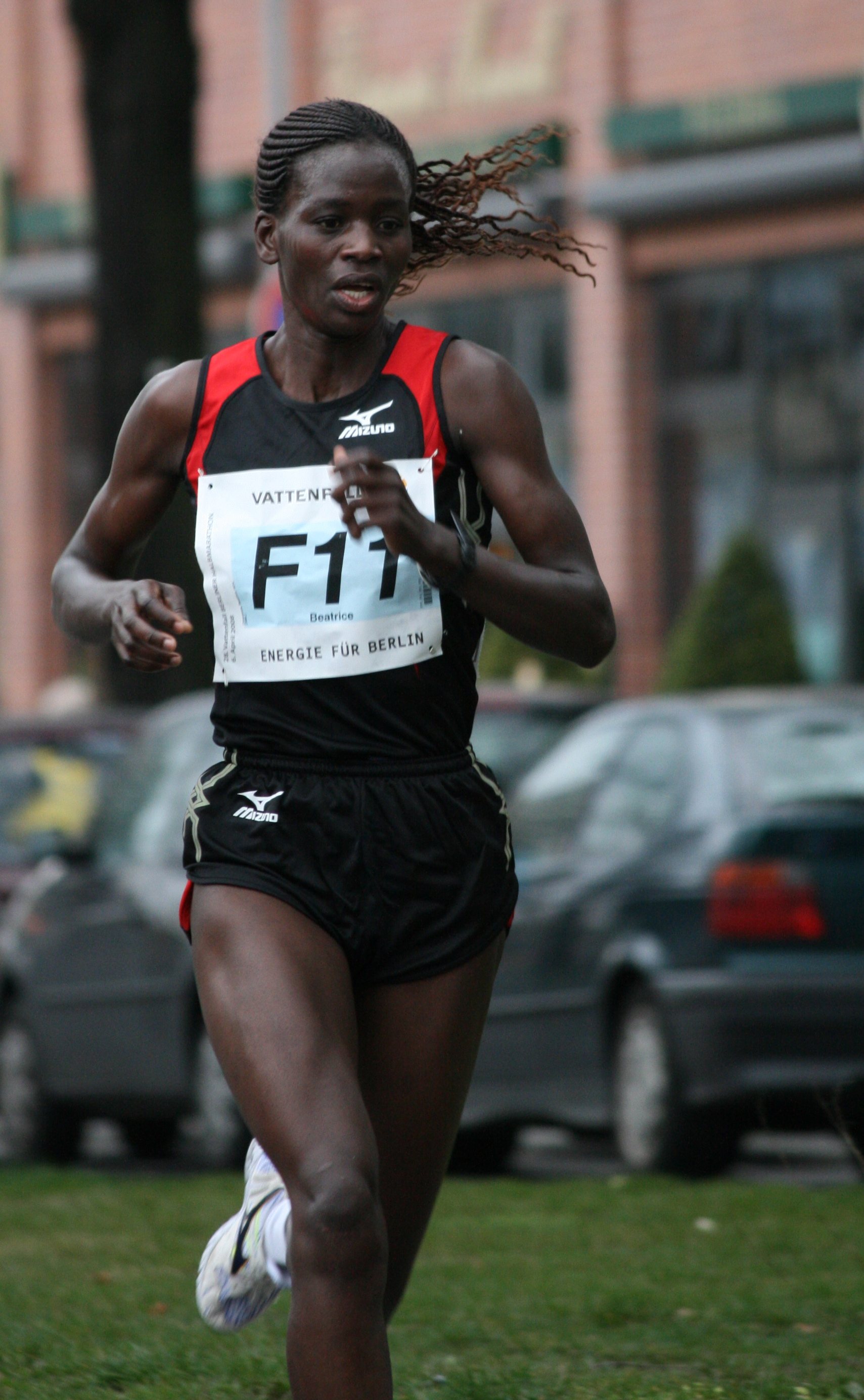
Beatrice Omwanza won both the Reims and Paris Marathons in 2003.

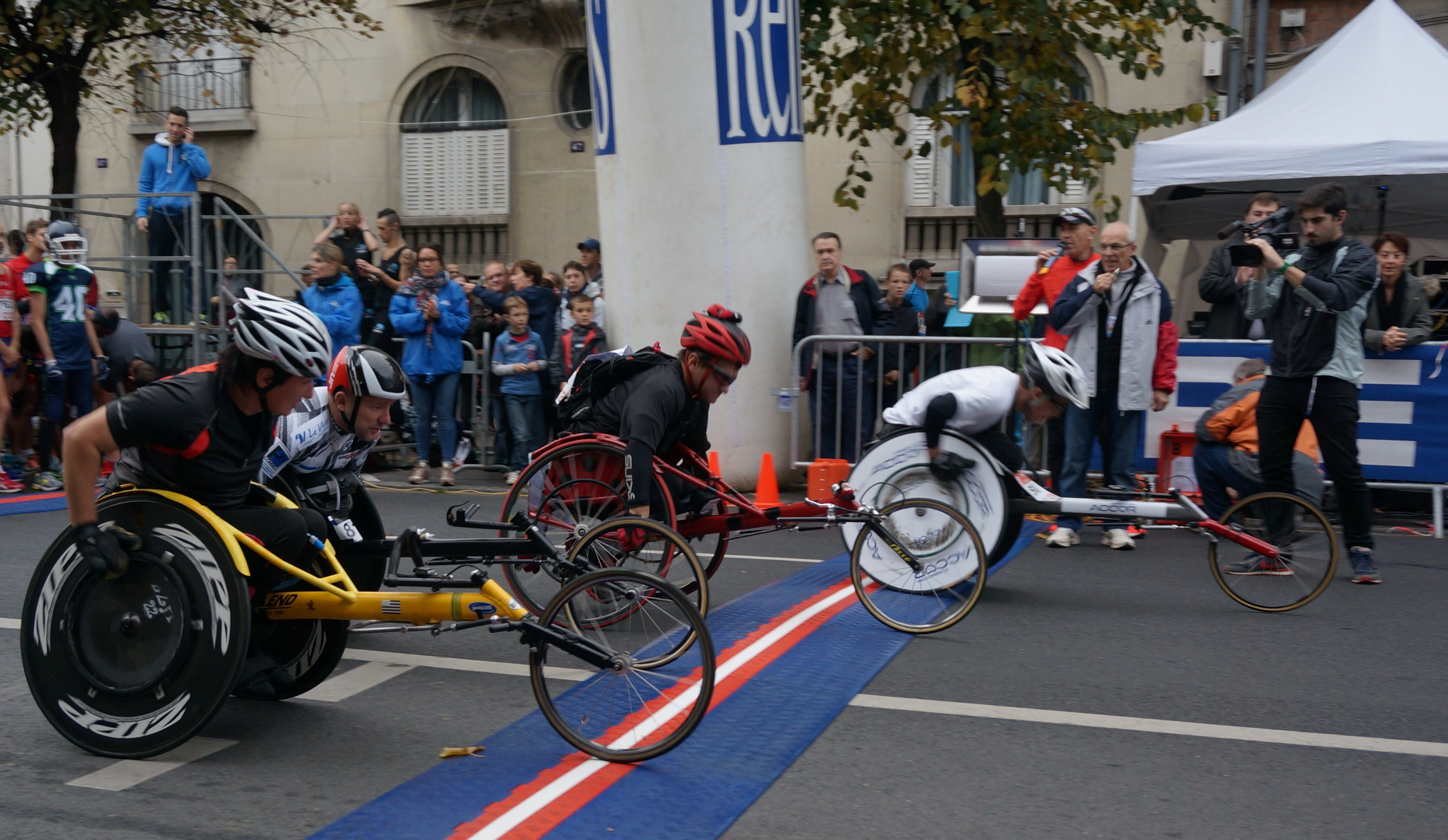
Start, 2013.

Key: Course record French championship race

Year	Men's winner	Time (h:m:s)	Women's winner	Time (h:m:s)
9-10-2016	Nicolas Fichter (FRA)	2:40:52	Claire Hermange (FRA)	3:20:35
11-10-2015	Guillaume Ninforge (BEL)	2:43:11	Anna Czupryniak (POL)	3:07:01
19-10-2014	Dejene Kelkiew (ETH)	2:11:21	Hailemaryam Ayantu (ETH)	2:33:59
20-10-2013	Peter Kiplagat Chebet (KEN)	2:06:05	Aberash Nesga (ETH)	2:35:11
21-10-2012	Mark Kiplagat Kipchumba (KEN)	2:11:36	Mude Zeytuna Abera (ETH)	2:38:45
16-10-2011	Demessew Tsega (ETH)	2:09:44	Julia Mombi (KEN)	2:29:35
17-10-2010	Stephen Chebogut (KEN)	2:09:38	Gisaw Melam (ETH)	2:28:58
18-10-2009	Abebe Hailu Dogaga (ETH)	2:09:34	Derebe Godana Gebissa (ETH)	2:31:45
19-10-2008	David Kemboi (KEN)	2:07:53	Agnes Kiprop (KEN)	2:32:37
21-10-2007	David Kemboi (KEN)	2:09:08	Martha Komu (KEN)	2:32:48
15-10-2006	Pius Maritim (KEN)	2:13:55	Martha Komu (KEN)	2:32:45
23-10-2005	Hussen Adilo (ETH)	2:12:02	Adanech Zekiros (ETH)	2:35:55
17-10-2004	Joseph Nguran (KEN)	2:13:31	Emebet Abossa (ETH)	2:35:59
26-10-2003	Charles Kibiwott (KEN)	2:10:20	Beatrice Omwanza (KEN)	2:32:02
20-10-2002	Charles Kibiwott (KEN)	2:12:12	Lucy Karimi (KEN)	2:35:26
21-10-2001	Robert Kipkoech Cheruiyot (KEN)	2:13:17	Zhanna Malkova (RUS)	2:35:56
22-10-2000	Benoît Zwierzchiewski (FRA)	2:10:47	Chantal Dallenbach (SUI)	2:33:34
24-10-1999	Fekadu Degefu (ETH)	2:11:33	Alla Zhilyaeva (RUS)	2:31:27
11-10-1998	Mohamed Ouaadi (FRA)	2:09:54	Irina Permitina (RUS)	2:33:29
12-10-1997	Ezael Thlobo (RSA)	2:12:03	Zinaida Semenova (RUS)	2:36:19
20-10-1996	Ezael Thlobo (RSA)	2:09:56	Alina Tecuta (ROM)	2:34:01
22-10-1995	Leszek Bebło (POL)	2:09:42	Alla Zhilyaeva (RUS)	2:27:38
23-10-1994	Vanderlei de Lima (BRA)	2:11:06	Stefania Statkuviene (LTU)	2:32:22
17-10-1993	Vincent Rousseau (BEL)	2:09:13	Judit Nagy (HUN)	2:32:07
25-10-1992	Leszek Bebło (POL)	2:11:42	Lutsia Belyayeva (RUS)	2:38:09
20-10-1991	Yevgeniy Okorokov (URS)	2:13:22	Fabiola Oppliger (SUI)	2:38:08
14-10-1990	Jean-Baptiste Protais (FRA)	2:17:30	Judit Nagy (HUN)	2:41:53
22-10-1989	Dominique Chauvelier (FRA)	2:16:28	Martine Van De Gehuchte (BEL)	2:44:37
16-10-1988	Mohammed Youkmane (ALG)	2:15:46	Martine Van De Gehuchte (BEL)	2:39:18
18-10-1987	Allaoua Khellil (ALG)	2:16:39	Veronique Vauzelle (FRA)	2:42:02
19-10-1986	Michel Lelut (FRA)	2:17:41	Tanya Ball (GBR)	2:54:37
27-10-1985	Alain Lazare (NCL)	2:16:07	Chantal Langlacé (FRA)	2:42:18
28-10-1984	Jean-Marie Ancion (BEL)	2:24:50	Marie-France Vassogne (FRA)	3:00:17

=== Half marathon ===
Year	Men's winner	Time (h:m:s)	Women's winner	Time (h:m:s)
2016	Romain Prudon (25x17px)	1:09:06	Coralie Baudoux (25x17px)	1:22:43
2015	Seboka Bira (ETH)	1:01:12	Perendis Lekapana (KEN)	1:11:03
2014	Muhajr Haredin Sraj (BHR)	1:03:34	Aziza Abate (ETH)	1:15:17
2013	Charles Barongo Ogari (KEN)	1:03:21	Gladys Kipsoi (KEN)	1:11:45
2012	Philemon Yator (KEN)	1:01:50	Woynishet Girma (ETH)	1:11:13
2011	Philemon Yator (KEN)	1:01:47	Atsede Baysa (ETH)	1:09:58
2010	Soloman Deksisa (ETH)	1:02:19	Christelle Daunay (FRA)	1:08:34
2009	Dieudonné Disi (RWA)	1:01:13	Meseret Mengistu (ETH)	1:09:45
2008	Dieudonné Disi (RWA)	1:02:04	Gladys Cherono (KEN)	1:11:42
2007	Dieudonné Disi (RWA)	1:01:13	Azalech Maresha (ETH)	1:11:29
2006	Vincent Krop (KEN)	1:03:22	Pauline Wangui Ngigi (KEN)	1:12:00
2005	Ben Kimutai Kimwole (KEN)	1:02:27	Teyba Erkesso (ETH)	1:10:00
2004	Mesfin Hailu (ETH)	1:02:19	Yelena Schoebareva (RUS)	1:12:53
2003	Mesfin Hailu (ETH)	1:02:22	Deriba Alemu (ETH)	1:10:45
2002	Wilson Onsare (KEN)	1:02:52	Isabella Ochichi (KEN)	1:10:03
2001	Francis Komu Wachira (KEN)	1:02:39	Isabella Ochichi (KEN)	1:09:05
