= Kiyeng =

Kiyeng is a surname of Kenyan origin. Notable people with the surname include:

- David Kemboi Kiyeng (born 1983), Kenyan marathon runner
- Hyvin Kiyeng Jepkemoi (born 1992), Kenyan steeplechase runner
- Judy Kiyeng (born 1993), Kenyan middle-distance runner
