= David Kemboi Kiyeng =

Kenyan marathon runner (born 1983)

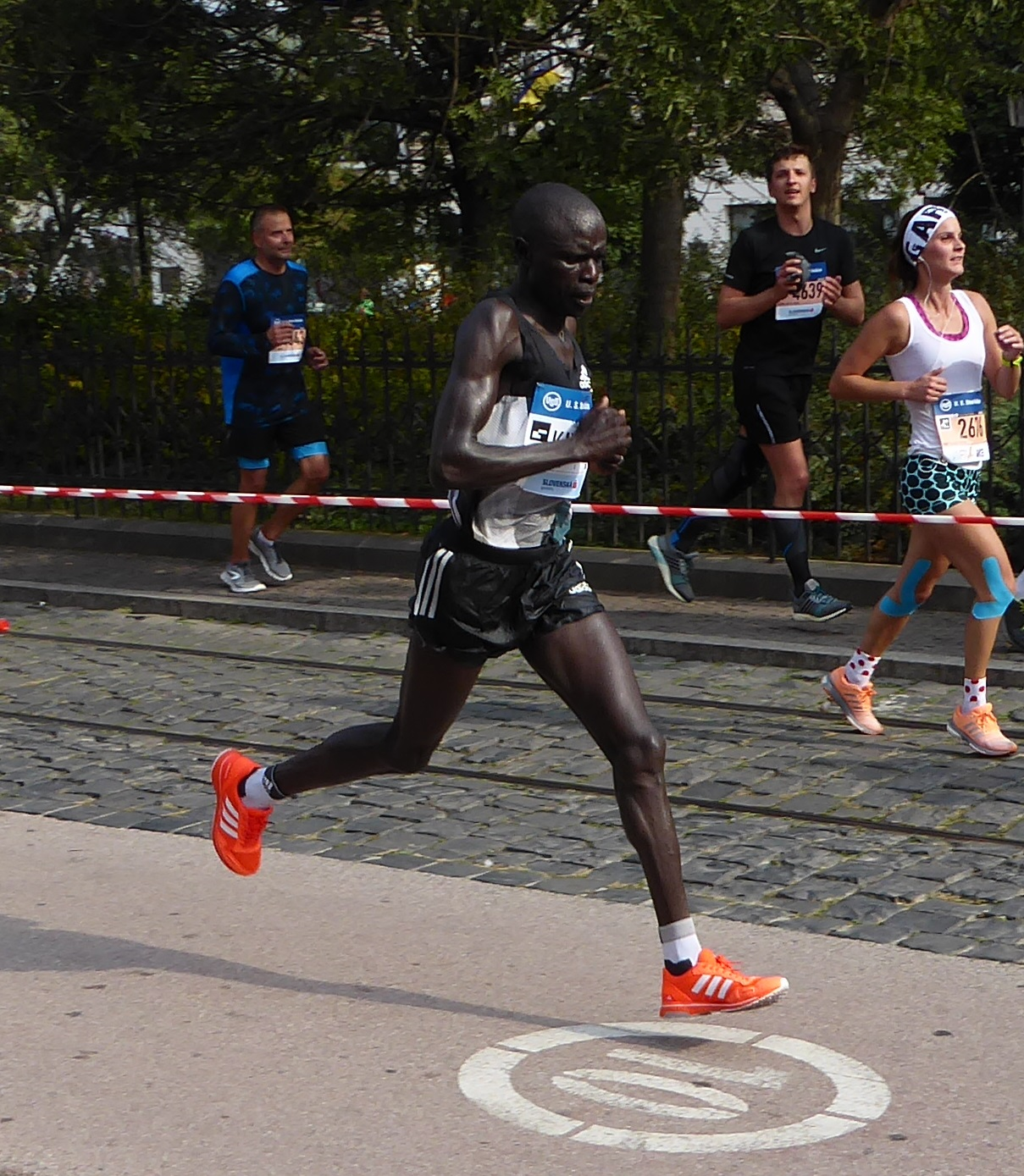
David Kemboi Kiyeng shortly before the finish line of Kosice Peace Marathon 2016 Košice Peace Marathon

David Kemboi Kiyeng (born 1983) is a Kenyan marathon runner. He is a two-time winner of the Reims Marathon and has also won the Italian Marathon, JoongAng Seoul Marathon, Chuncheon Marathon and Daegu Marathon. His personal best for the distance is 2:06:26, which was set at the 2009 edition of the Paris Marathon.

== Career ==
His first major marathon competition came in 2006 at the Prague International Marathon and he finished second behind Hassan Mubarek Shami in a time of 2:11:42. Working with top Italian distance running coach, Claudio Berardelli, he improved his best in his second outing at the Italian Marathon and defeated David Makori in a sprint finish to the line to win his first race. Kiyeng began his 2007 season at the Beppu-Ōita Marathon but his time of 2:11:26 left him third place, finishing after the Japanese opposition of Atsushi Fujita and Atsushi Sato. He improved further at the Reims Marathon later that year, however, recording 2:09:08 to win the French race.

Kiyeng came close to his best at the 2008 Paris Marathon – his highest level marathon at that point – but he finished in tenth place in a race where the top two ran under 2:07 for the distance. He stayed on in France to attempt a defence of his title in Reims and he did so, gaining a new personal best of 2:07:53 in the process. He set a half marathon best at the Lago Maggiore Half Marathon, running 1:00:44 for third position. Undeterred by the level of competition from the previous year, he entered the 2009 Paris Marathon. His finishing time of 2:06:26 would have been enough to win in 2008, but it brought him third place on this occasion as Vincent Kipruto Limo and Bazu Worku both moved into the top-20 fastest ever for the marathon. He headed to the Far East in the second half of the year and was sixth at the Beijing Marathon before going on to a fourth-place finish at the JoongAng Seoul Marathon.

He spent the whole of 2010 in the region and took on pacemaking duties at the Xiamen International Marathon and the Seoul International Marathon – he completed the latter race and was fourth with a time of 2:09:00. He was third at the Yellow River Estuary International Marathon in Dongying in May. He took part in Seoul's second marathon of the year (the JoongAng Seoul Marathon) and came first with a time which was two seconds off Jason Mbote's course record.

In 2011 he won the São Paulo Marathon in June, but had a poor showing at the Reims Marathon where he finished in 13th place. He returned to defend his title at the JoongAng Seoul Marathon but was beaten by James Kwambai, although his time of 2:09:21 hours was his best outing of the year. A second Korean win came at the Daegu Marathon in March 2012, where he ran a course record time of 2:07:57 hours, and a third followed at the Chuncheon Marathon in October.

In 2016 he won the Košice Peace Marathon in the time of 2:08:57.
