= Ayanna =

Ayanna is a feminine given name. Notable people with the name include:

- Ayanna Alexander (born 1982), Trinidad and Tobago triple jumper
- Ayanna Dyette (1986–2018), Trinidad and Tobago volleyball player
- Ayanna Howard (born 1972), American roboticist and researcher
- Ayanna Hutchinson (born 1978), Trinidad and Tobago sprint athlete
- Ayanna McClean, Trinidad and Tobago field hockey defender and umpire
- Ayanna Oliva (born 1986), Filipina model, singer, and VJ
- Ayanna Pressley (born 1974), U.S. representative from Massachusetts
- Ayanna Witter-Johnson (born 1980s), British composer, singer, songwriter and cellist

Notable people with the surname:

- Charlotte Ayanna (born 1976), American actress and former Miss Teen USA

== See also ==
- Ayana (name)
