= Meseret Sisay Gola =

Ethiopian long-distance runner

Personal information
- Nationality: Ethiopian
- Born: Meseret Sisay Gola; 30 December 1997 (age 28) Ethiopia
- Occupation: long-distance runner
- Years active: 2020–present

Sport
- Country: Ethiopia
- Sport: Athletics
- Event(s): Marathon, Half marathon, Cross Country

Achievements and titles
- Personal bests: Marathon: 2:20:50 (2022); Half marathon: 1:09:02 (2020)
Medal record
Athletics
Representing Ethiopia
Silver medal – second place	2024 World Athletics Cross Country Championships	Team (Cross Country)
Gold medal – first place	2023 Osaka Women's Marathon	Marathon

Meseret Sisay Gola (born 30 December 1997) is an Ethiopian long-distance runner who competes in marathon, half marathon, and cross country events.

== Career ==
Meseret Sisay Gola began competing in the early 2020s. In 2020, she competed in the women's half marathon at the 2020 World Athletics Half Marathon Championships in Gdynia, Poland, where she ran a personal best of 1:09:02.

In 2022, Gola set her marathon personal best of 2:20:50 at the Seville Marathon. Later that year, she won the Osaka Women's Marathon with a time of 2:22:12. She also finished fifth at the 2022 Berlin Marathon with a time of 2:20:58.

In 2024, she was part of the Ethiopian team that won a silver medal in the team event at the 2024 World Athletics Cross Country Championships. She also competed in the 2024 Berlin Marathon, finishing with a time of 2:23:36.

== Achievements ==
Year	Race	Place	Position	Time
2020	2020 World Athletics Half Marathon Championships	Gdynia	15th	1:09:02 (PB)
2022	Seville Marathon	Seville	—	2:20:50 (PB)
2022	Osaka Women's Marathon	Osaka	1st	2:22:12
2022	2022 Berlin Marathon	Berlin	5th	2:20:58
2024	2024 World Athletics Cross Country Championships	Belgrade	—	Team silver medal
2024	2024 Berlin Marathon	Berlin	10th	2:23:36
