= Elisha Rotich =

Kenyan long-distance runner

Elisha Rotich is a Kenyan long-distance runner who specializes in the marathon. Rotich has a personal best in the marathon of 2:04:21, which he set when he won and set the course record at the Paris Marathon in 2021. Rotich also won the 2016 Cannes Marathon des Alpes-Maritimes, the 2017 Chuncheon Chosunilbo Marathon, and the 2018 Eindhoven Marathon.

== Career ==
=== Early career 2010 - 2015 ===
Rotich began his career racing mainly road races from 10k to marathon. Rotich's marathon debut was at the 2011 Kassel Marathon, where he placed 3rd in 2:15:18. In 2014 Rotich won the Strasbourg Half Marathon and the Altötting Half Marathon in Germany. In 2015 he secured his first marathon victory at the San Sebastián Marathon in Spain clocking 2:13:56.

=== 2016 - 2018 ===
In 2016 Rotich placed 3rd in the Kraków Marathon, before winning the Cannes Marathon des Alpes-Maritimes in 2:10:45. In 2017 Elisha won the Gunsan Marathon and the Chuncheon Chosunilbo Marathon, both in South Korea, and clocking 2:08:58 in the latter. In 2018 Rotich placed 4th in the Daegu Marathon in 2:07:50. Later in the year Rotich secured another marathon victory on 14 October winning the Eindhoven Marathon in 2:07:32.

=== 2019 - present ===
On 17 March, 2019 Rotich ran the Seoul Marathon, where he placed 2nd in 2:06:12, while the race was won by Thomas Kiplagat in 2:06:00. On 31 August he placed 5th at the Semi Marathon in Lille, France in 1:00:42. Rotich then placed 3rd in the Amsterdam Marathon on 20 October in 2:05:18, while his compatriot Vincent Kipchumba won the race in 2:05:09. In 2020 Rotich raced one marathon. On 20 December he placed second at the Taipei Marathon in 2:13:07. The race was won by his compatriot Paul Lonyangata, who set a new course record of 2:09:18. In 2021 Elisha placed 10th in the Milan Marathon on 16 May in a time of 2:06:44. Next Rotich raced the Paris Marathon on 17 October where he won the race in a new course record of 2:04:21, breaking Kenenisa Bekele's previous course record of 2:05:04 from 2014. On New Year's Eve 2021 in São Paulo Rotich placed 4th at the 96° Corrida Internacional de São Silvestre in 46:26 a personal best.

== Personal bests ==
Outdoor

Event	Time	Date	Place
5000 m	14:17.97	9 June 2014	Prague
10k	28:04	30 March 2013	Paderborn
15k	46:26	31 December 2021	São Paulo
Half Marathon	1:00:42	31 August 2019	Lille
Marathon	2:04:21	17 October 2021	Paris
