= Benard Biwott =

Kenyan long-distance runner

Personal information
- Nationality: Kenyan
- Born: Benard Biwott; 26 May 2002 (age 24) Kenya
- Occupation: long-distance runner
- Years active: 2023–present

Sport
- Country: Kenya
- Sport: Athletics
- Events: Marathon, Half marathon

Achievements and titles
- Personal bests: Marathon: 2:05:25 (Paris, 13 April 2025); Half marathon: 59:44 (Santa Pola, 22 January 2023)

Benard Biwott (born 26 May 2002) is a Kenyan long-distance runner who specializes in marathon and half marathon events. Notably, he made a winning marathon debut at the 2024 Frankfurt Marathon, followed by a victory at the 2025 Paris Marathon, where he improved his personal best time to 2:05:25.

== Career ==
Biwott emerged as a prominent road runner in the early 2020s. In January 2023, he set his half marathon personal best of 59:44 at the Santa Pola Half Marathon in Spain.

In October 2024, Biwott made a successful marathon debut by winning the Frankfurt Marathon with a time of 2:05:54.

On 13 April 2025, he secured his second marathon victory at the Paris Marathon, improving his personal best to 2:05:25. He made a decisive break from the lead pack with approximately 10 kilometers remaining to win comfortably.

== Personal bests ==
- Marathon: 2:05:25 (Paris, 13 April 2025)
- Half marathon: 59:44 (Santa Pola, 22 January 2023)

== Achievements ==
Year	Competition	Venue	Position	Time
2024	Frankfurt Marathon	Frankfurt, Germany	1st	2:05:54
2025	Paris Marathon	Paris, France	1st	2:05:25
