= 2026 Tokyo Marathon =

Long-distance running race in Japan

19th Tokyo Marathon
- Location: Tokyo, Japan
- Date: Sunday, 1 March 2026 (7 months ago)
- Website: www.marathon.tokyo/en/

Champions
- Men: Tadese Takele (2:03:37)
- Women: Brigid Kosgei (2:14:29)
- Wheelchair men: Marcel Hug (1:21:09)
- Wheelchair women: Catherine Debrunner (1:37:15)

The 2026 Tokyo Marathon was the 19th edition of the annual marathon race in Tokyo, held on Sunday, 1 March 2026. A Platinum Label marathon, it was the first of seven World Marathon Majors events to be held in 2026.

== Map and course preview ==
The 2026 Tokyo Marathon map and a course video are available.

== Results ==
=== Men ===
Elite men's top 10 finishers
| Position | Athlete | Nationality | Time |
|---|---|---|---|
| 1st place, gold medalist(s) | Tadese Takele | Ethiopia | 2:03:37 |
| 2nd place, silver medalist(s) | Geoffrey Toroitich | Kenya | 2:03:37 |
| 3rd place, bronze medalist(s) | Alexander Mutiso | Kenya | 2:03:38 |
| 4 | Daniel Mateiko | Kenya | 2:03:44 |
| 5 | Muktar Edris | Ethiopia | 2:04:07 |
| 6 | Iliass Aouani | Italy | 2:04:26 |
| 7 | Selemon Barega | Ethiopia | 2:05:00 |
| 8 | Seifu Tura | Ethiopia | 2:05:02 |
| 9 | Vincent Kipkemoi Ngetich | Kenya | 2:05:21 |
| 10 | Shifera Tamru | Ethiopia | 2:05:56 |

=== Women ===
Elite women's top 10 finishers
| Position | Athlete | Nationality | Time |
|---|---|---|---|
| 1st place, gold medalist(s) | Brigid Kosgei | Kenya | 2:14:29 |
| 2nd place, silver medalist(s) | Bertukan Welde | Ethiopia | 2:16:36 |
| 3rd place, bronze medalist(s) | Hawi Feysa | Ethiopia | 2:17:39 |
| 4 | Sutume Asefa Kebede | Ethiopia | 2:17:39 |
| 5 | Alemu Megertu | Ethiopia | 2:18:50 |
| 6 | Viola Cheptoo | Kenya | 2:19:05 |
| 7 | Mestawot Fikir | Ethiopia | 2:20:00 |
| 8 | Aberu Ayana | Ethiopia | 2:20:30 |
| 9 | Pascalia Jepkogei | Kenya | 2:21:39 |
| 10 | Ai Hosoda | Japan | 2:23:39 |

=== Men's Wheelchair ===
Wheelchair men's race result
| Position | Athlete | Nationality | Time |
|---|---|---|---|
| 1st place, gold medalist(s) | Marcel Hug | Switzerland | 1:21:09 |
| 2nd place, silver medalist(s) | Luo Xingchuan | China | 1:28:08 |
| 3rd place, bronze medalist(s) | Sho Watanabe | Japan | 1:33:10 |
| 4 | Sam Rizzo | Australia | 1:33:12 |
| 5 | Geert Schipper | Netherlands | 1:33:12 |

=== Women's Wheelchair ===
Wheelchair women's race result
| Position | Athlete | Nationality | Time |
|---|---|---|---|
| 1st place, gold medalist(s) | Catherine Debrunner | Switzerland | 1:37:15 |
| 2nd place, silver medalist(s) | Eden Rainbow-Cooper | Great Britain | 1:41:13 |
| 3rd place, bronze medalist(s) | Zhou Zhaoqian | China | 1:41:13 |
| 4 | Tatyana McFadden | United States | 1:41:15 |
| 5 | Vanessa Cristina de Souza | Brazil | 1:41:20 |

== Figures ==
Tadese Takele became only the second man ever to win two consecutive Tokyo Marathon titles, after Birhanu Legese in 2019 and 2020. Female winner Brigid Kosgei set a course record of 2:14:29, taking a minute off the previous mark from 2024. 5.6% of finishers finished in under 3 hours, the highest percentage in the history of the Tokyo Marathon. Overall, 73.9% of finishers were male and 26.1% were female.
