= Martha Komu =

Kenyan long-distance runner

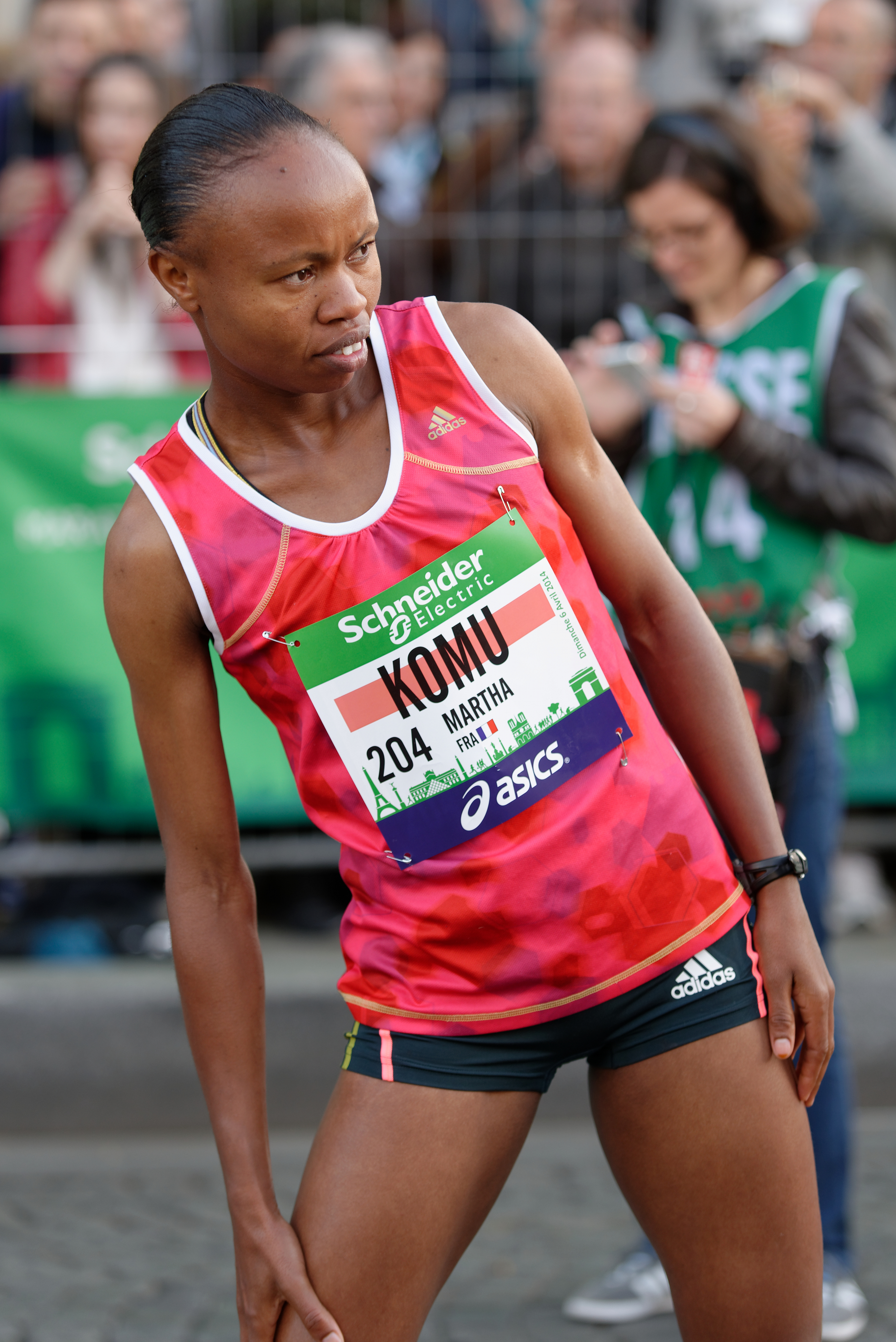
Komu warms-up before the 2014 Paris Marathon

Martha Komu (born March 23, 1983, in Gathanji, Laikipia District) is a Kenyan runner who specialises in a marathon. She won the Paris Marathon in 2008 and finished fifth at the 2008 Summer Olympics.

== Career ==
Komu started her education at Nyakiambi and Lariak primary schools. In 1997 she went to Laikipia High School, where she started running. In her early career she took part in various road running and cross country running competitions, but without major success. In 2003, she moved her base to France, where she represents the Clermont Athlétisme Auvergne athletics club.

After a maternity break in 2005, she returned to competition in 2006 and won the Mont Saint-Michel marathon, her debut marathon. She also won the Rheims marathon in 2006 and 2007. In 2008, she won the Paris Marathon, setting a personal record of 2:25.33 hours. This performance earned her a place in the Kenyan Olympics team. Her husband Simon Munyutu finished 11th in the men's race at the 2008 Paris Marathon; their combined time of 4:34:57 hours, according to marathon statistician Marty Post, is the best achieved by a married couple in the same marathon.

== Personal life ==
Komu was the sixth born of twelve children. Her father used to be a runner and her elder brother Francis Komu is a road running competitor.

She is married to Simon Munyutu, a Kenyan-born runner who represents France. They both competed at the 2008 Olympics, but for different countries. They have a daughter born in 2005.

== Achievements ==
Year	Competition	Venue	Position	Event	Notes
Representing Kenya
2006	Reims Marathon	Reims, France	1st	Marathon	2:32:45
2006	Marseille-Cassis Classique Internationale	Marseille, France	1st	Half Marathon	1:12:34
2007	Reims Marathon	Reims, France	1st	Marathon	2:32:48
2008	Olympic Games	Beijing, PR China	5th	Marathon	2:27:23

- 2006 Mont-Saint-Michel Marathon - 1st
- 2007 Rotterdam Marathon - 8th
- 2008 Paris Marathon - 1st
