= Kindie Derseh Kassie =

Ethiopian long-distance runner

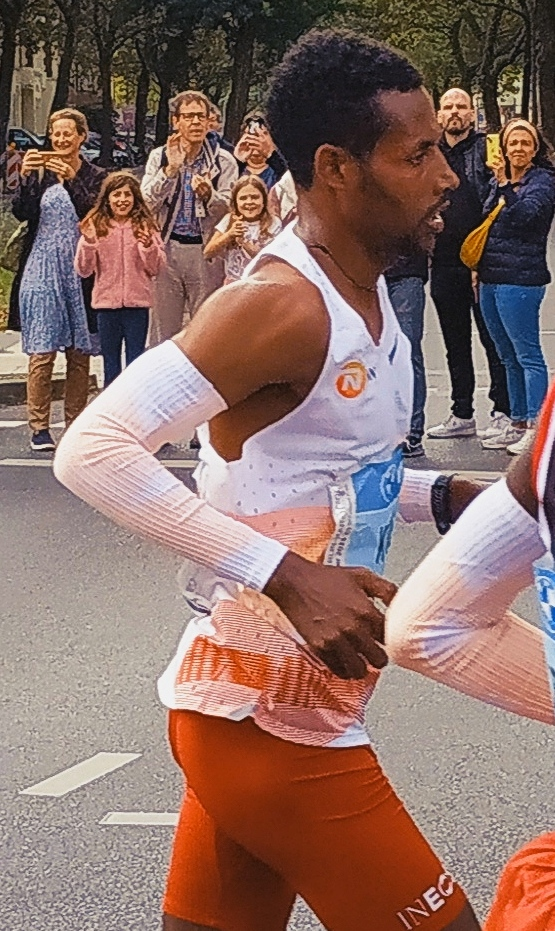
- Derseh at the 2023 Berlin Marathon

Personal information
- Nationality: Ethiopian
- Born: Derseh Kindie Kassie; 4 February 1999 (age 27) Ethiopia
- Occupation: long-distance runner
- Years active: 2021–present

Sport
- Country: Ethiopia
- Sport: Athletics
- Events: Marathon, Half marathon

Achievements and titles
- Personal bests: Marathon: 2:05:49 (2023); Half marathon: 59:18 (2022)

Derseh Kindie (born Kindie Derseh Kassie - Amharic ኪንዴ ደርሰህ ካሲዬ - on 4 February 1999) is an Ethiopian long-distance runner specializing in the marathon and half marathon. He has achieved victories in various international races and gained significant recognition for leading the early charge alongside Eliud Kipchoge at the 2023 Berlin Marathon. His personal best time of 2:05:49 was set at the 2023 Valencia Marathon.

== Career ==
=== Early career ===
Kindie Derseh has a personal best in the half marathon of 59:18, achieved in 2022.

In 2021, he secured his first major victory at the San Sebastián Marathon with a time of 2:12:09.

In 2022, he finished second at the Cape Town Marathon, clocking 2:11:26. He said he had an "incredible" race but could not keep up with Stephen Mokoka. He said, "Up to 32km the group was alternating positions a lot, so it was an exciting race, but when Stephen broke away, I had to accept that I am the underdog here. Stephen has run and won here before, he knows the route much better, where to run the shortest route and where to push the pace, and eventually I had to give up trying to catch him."

He also finished 5th at the 2021 Hamburg Marathon in 2:17:36 and 10th at the 2022 Zurich Marathon Barcelona with a time of 2:08:21.

=== 2023 Berlin Marathon ===
Derseh was described as "unheralded" before the 2023 Berlin Marathon, with a marathon personal best of only 2:08:33. Despite this, he opened a gap on the field along with reigning Olympic champion and world record holder Eliud Kipchoge within the first three kilometres.

He stayed in the lead through half-way into the race, becoming the only runner not to have been dropped by Kipchoge. Though he stayed in contention for most of the race, Kipchoge eventually passed him. About one minute later, he dropped out around 32 kilometres (20 mi) into the competition and did not finish. Derseh was said to have challenged Kipchoge almost all the way until that time.

=== Later career ===
His marathon personal best of 2:05:49 was set at the Valencia Marathon in December 2023, where he finished 12th in a highly competitive field. Kassie finished 10th at the 2024 Berlin Marathon with a time of 2:05:54. Earlier in 2024, he also finished 7th at the Seoul International Marathon with a time of 2:07:22.

=== Significant Media Coverage ===
In 2021, Kindie's victory at the San Sebastián Marathon was extensively covered by the Spanish newspaper Diario Vasco, whose report highlighted his strategic move to take the lead after 30 kilometers. Despite challenging rainy conditions, he finished in 2:12:11, a performance the article deemed "better than expected." Kindie was quoted, reflecting on his improvement from a previous marathon in Hamburg, stating, "I'm even ready to go under 2:10."

Subsequently, Kindie's strong second-place finish at the 2022 Cape Town Marathon also garnered substantial attention from multiple South African news sources, including Runner's World South Africa, IOL Cape Times, News24, and The Citizen.

Kindie's participation in the 2023 Berlin Marathon generated widespread international media scrutiny, largely due to his surprising and prolonged challenge to marathon legend and then-world record holder Eliud Kipchoge. News organizations such as Olympics.com, MyJoyOnline.com, AIMS World Running, Nation.Africa, and CNN.com reported on his prominent role in the race.

== Achievements ==
Year	Race	City	Position	Time
2021	Hamburg Marathon	Hamburg	5th	2:17:36
2021	San Sebastián Marathon	San Sebastián	1st	2:12:09
2022	Zurich Marató Barcelona	Barcelona	10th	2:08:21
2022	Sanlam Cape Town Marathon	Cape Town	2nd	2:11:26
2023	Valencia Marathon	Valencia	12th	2:05:49 (PB)
2024	Seoul International Marathon	Seoul	7th	2:07:22
2024	2024 Berlin Marathon	Berlin	10th	2:05:54
