= Cyprian Kimurgor Kotut =

Kenyan long-distance runner

Cyprian Kotut
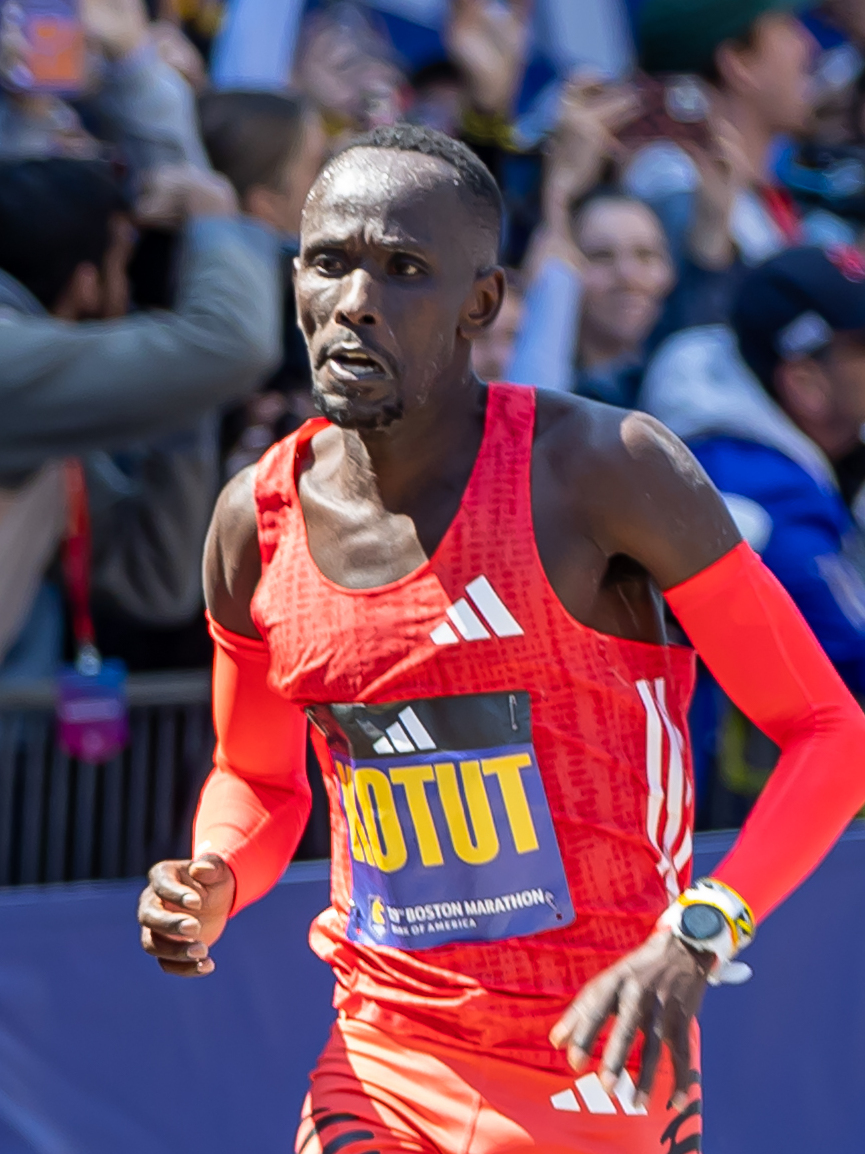
- Kotut crossing the finishing line at the 2025 Boston Marathon, in which he placed third

Personal information
- Full name: Cyprian Kimurgor Kotut
- Born: 6 June 1992 (age 34)

Sport
- Sport: Athletics
- Event: Long-distance running
Medal record
Men's athletics
Representing Kenya
World Marathon Majors
Silver medal – second place	2024 Berlin	Marathon
Bronze medal – third place	2025 Boston	Marathon

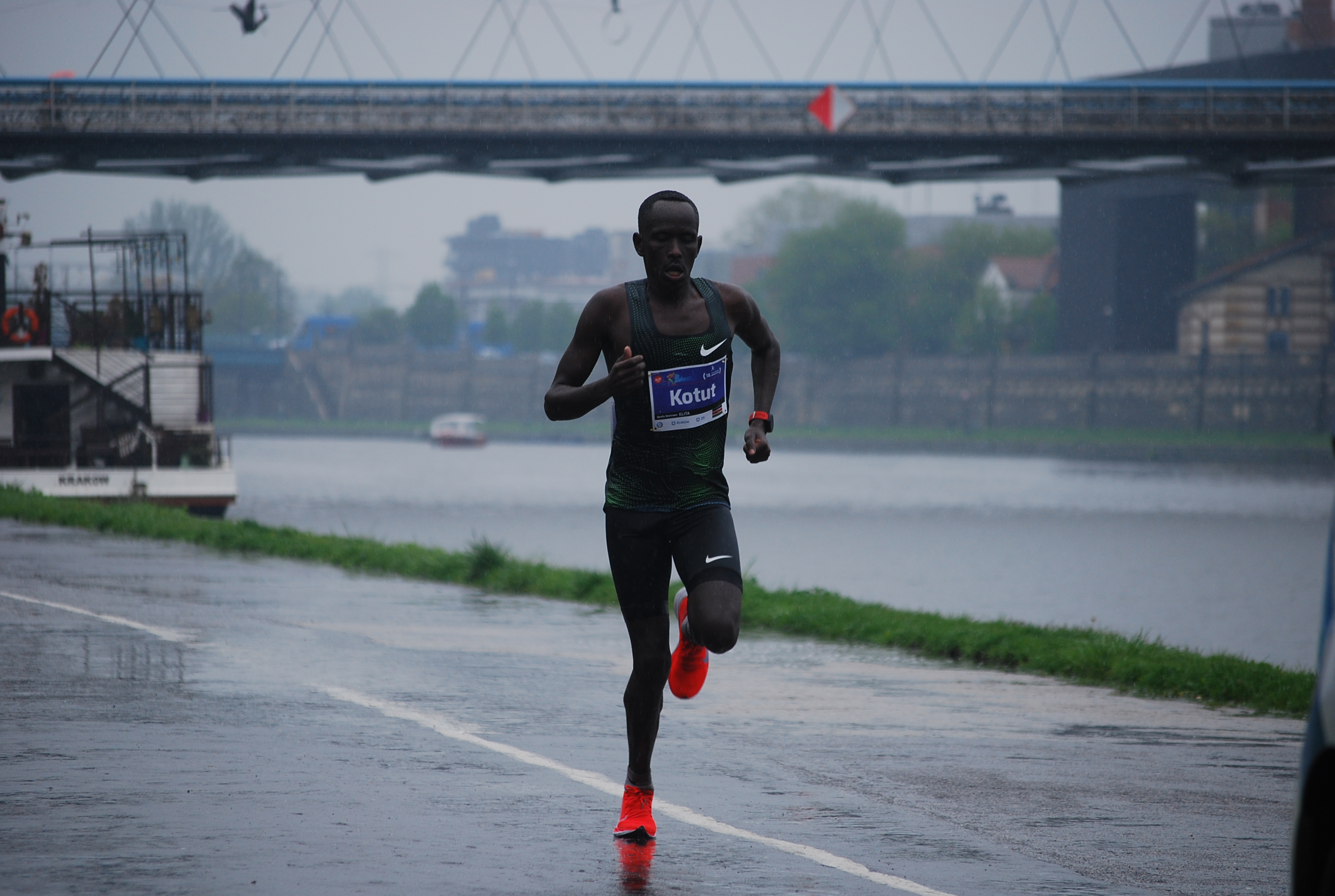
18. PZU Cracovia Marathon 2019 (Krakow, Poland)

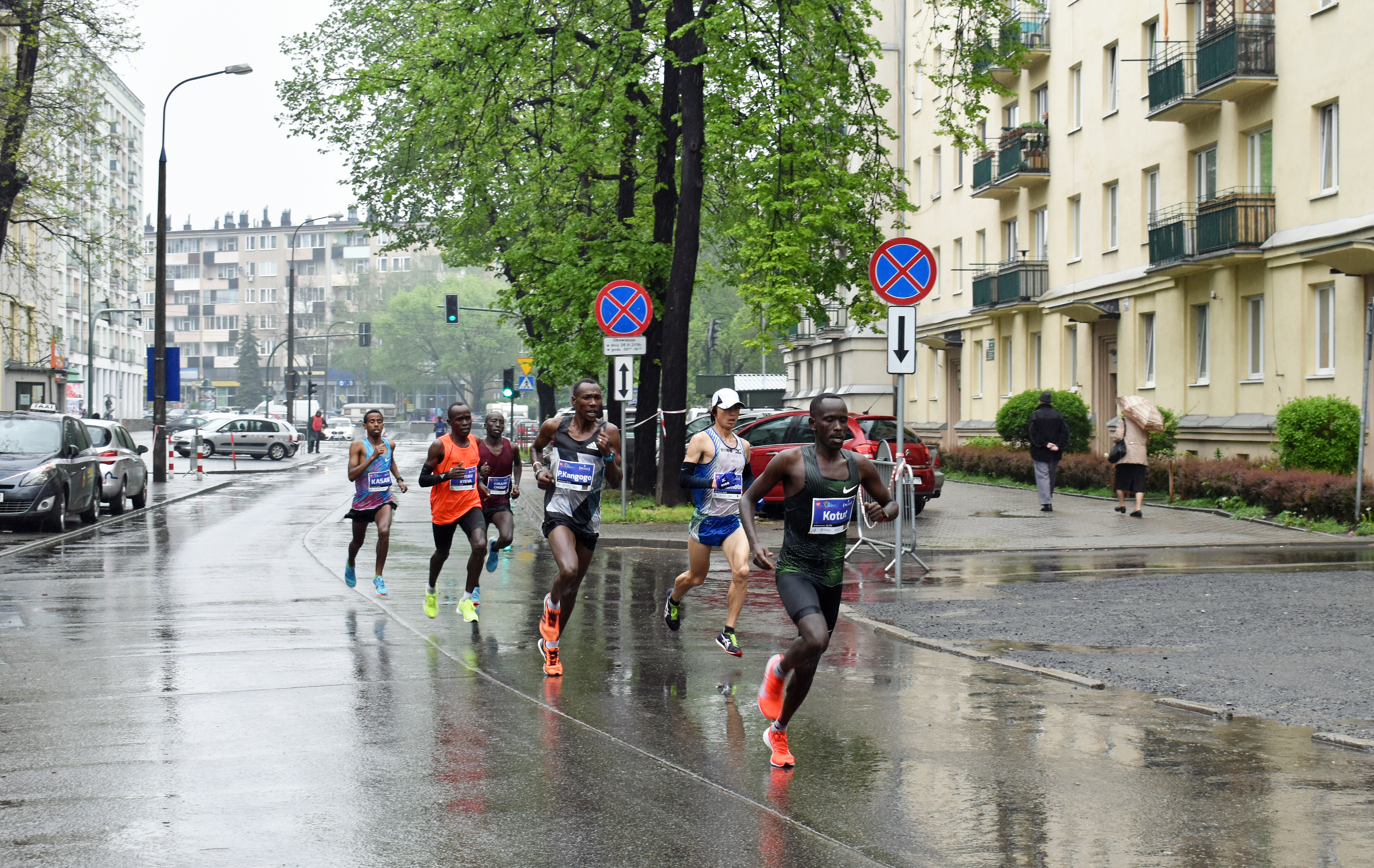
18. PZU Cracovia Marathon 2019 (Krakow, Poland). Winner.

Cyprian Kimurgor Kotut (born 6 June 1992), also known as Cybrian Kotut, is a Kenyan professional long-distance runner who competes in the marathon. His best for the distance is 2:04:47 hours. He was the winner of the 2016 Paris Marathon. He also holds a half marathon best of 59:12 minutes, set in 2014.

== Career ==
The brother of Martin Lel (a former winner of the London Marathon), Kotut began to compete in professional road races in 2012. He placed fourth at both the Portugal Half Marathon and the Marseille-Cassis Classique Internationale that year. At the start of the following year he travelled to the United States and took third at the Mardi Gras Half Marathon, but an attempted debut at the longer distance ended in a failure to finish at the Linz Marathon. A career breakthrough came at the Philadelphia Half Marathon in September, where his time of 59:59 minutes brought him runner-up spot behind Stanley Biwott. This gained him his highest global placing yet, at twelfth for the season.

Kotut ran on the 2013–14 Spanish cross country circuit and won at the Cross de Venta de Baños and the Cross Zornotza. He also set a best for the 10K run of 28:17 minutes to win the We Run Rome race. He fared poorly in the first half of 2014, recording a slow half marathon of 69:05 minutes and failing to finish at the 2014 London Marathon. A return to Philadelphia saw him repeat both his time and his placing, beaten by world medallist Bedan Karoki Muchiri this time. A further improvement at the Delhi Half Marathon at 59:12 minutes for fourth place saw him ranked sixth in the world. He competed sparingly in 2015, but still performed to a high standard, with runner-up finishes at the CPC Loop Den Haag and Milan Marathon (2:08:55 hours).

Two victories came in Paris for Kotut at the start of 2016 – his first wins beyond the 10K distance. First, he won the Paris Half Marathon, then topped the podium at the Paris Marathon. He recorded a personal best of 2:07:13 and easily beat the runner-up, Mark Korir, who had entered as defending champion. The sudden win at a high quality race was unexpected for Kotut, and he remarked: "I had prepared well but not for this victory. It’s a surprise for me."

In 2022, he won the Hamburg Marathon in a personal best of 2.04:47 beating the course record of Eliud Kipchoge from 2013.

In 2025, he finished third in the 2025 Boston Marathon, in a time of 2:05:04

== Circuit wins ==
- Hamburg Marathon: 2022
- Florence Marathon: 2021
- Cracovia Marathon: 2019
- Paris Marathon: 2016
- Paris Half Marathon: 2016
- Cross Internacional de Venta de Baños: 2013
- Cross Zornotza: 2014

== Personal bests ==
- 1500 metres – 3:43.77 min (2010)
- 5000 metres – 13:42.68 min (2011)
- 10K run – 28:17 min (2013)
- Half marathon – 59:12 min (2014)
- Marathon – 2:04:47 (2022)

Information from All Athletics
