= Haymanot Alew =

Ethiopian long-distance runner (born 1997)

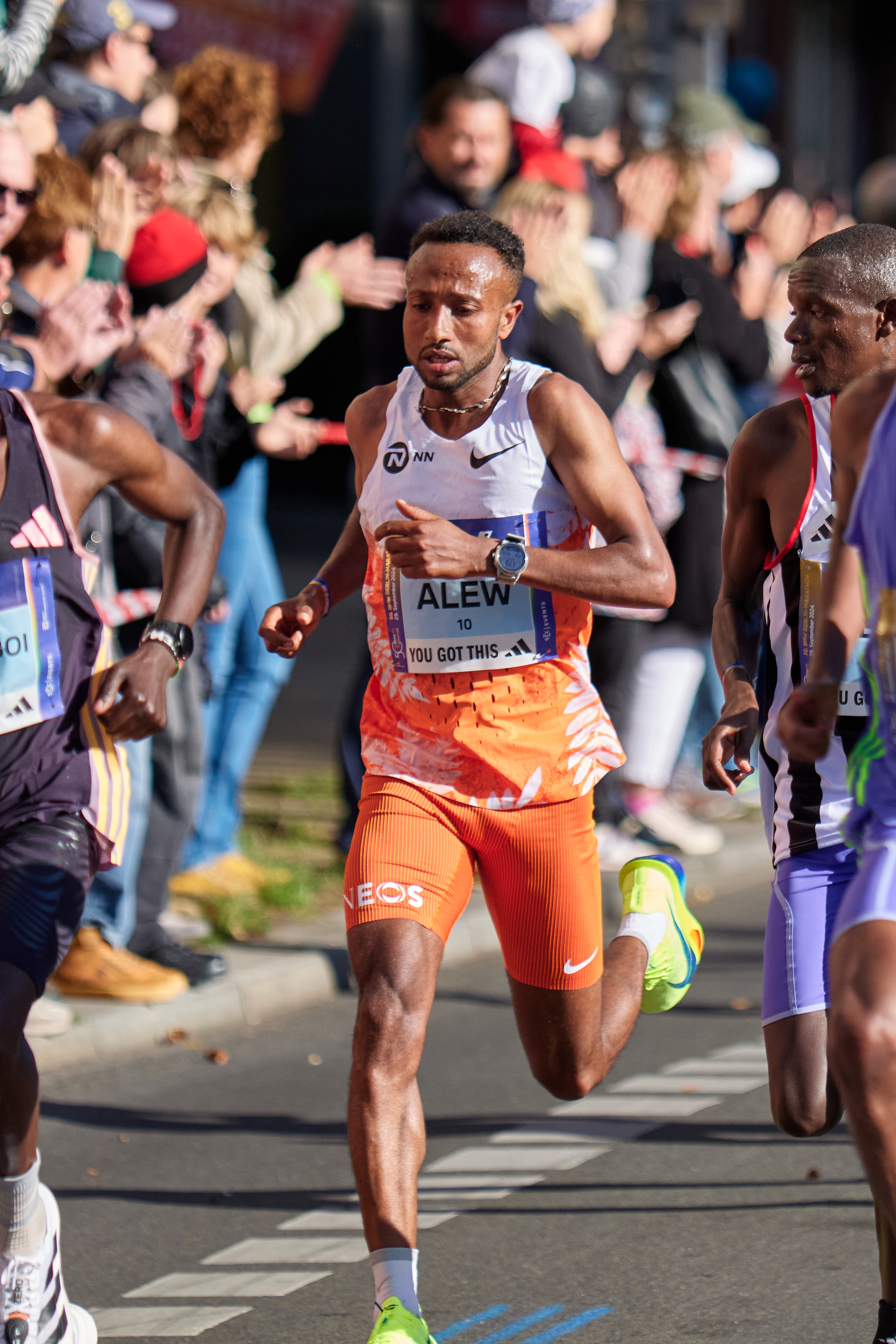
- Haymanot competing in the 2024 Berlin Marathon

Personal information
- Full name: Haymanot Alew Engdayehu
- Born: 11 November 1997 (age 28)

Sport
- Country: Ethiopia
- Sport: Athletics

Achievements and titles
- Personal bests: 15 km Road: 42:20 (Le Puy-en-Velay 2018); Half marathon: 1:00.26 (Istanbul) 2019); Marathon: 2:03:31 (Berlin 2024)
Medal record
World Marathon Majors
Bronze medal – third place	2024 Berlin	Marathon

Haymanot Alew Engdayehu (born 11 November 1997) is an Ethiopian long-distance runner. He finished third at the 2024 Berlin Marathon.

== Career ==
In 2018, Haymanot set a personal best of 42:20 over the 15 km in finishing second at the Le Puy-en-Velay 15 km. In June, he placed tenth over 3000 m at the Golden Spike Ostrava in 7:43.26. At the 2018 African Championships in Asaba, Haymanot placed eighth over 5000 m.

Haymanot ran his debut marathon at the Porto Marathon on 6 November 2022, finishing second in 2:11:10. On 12 February 2023, he improved his personal best to 2:05:57 at the Dubai Marathon.

On 28 April 2024, Haymanot finished second at the Haspa Hamburg Marathon running a new personal best of 2:05.30. Later that year, he finished third at the Berlin Marathon, running 2:03:31 which moved him up to 23rd on the all-time lists at the time.
