= Gizealew Ayana =

Ethiopian long-distance runner

Personal information
- Nationality: Ethiopian
- Born: Gizealew Abeje Ayana; February 11, 2003 (age 23) Ethiopia
- Occupation: Long-distance runner
- Years active: 2021–present

Sport
- Country: Ethiopia
- Sport: Track and field
- Event(s): Marathon, Half marathon

Achievements and titles
- Personal bests: Marathon: 2:07:15 (Paris, 2023); Half Marathon: 59:39 (Valencia, 2021)

Gizealew Abeje Ayana (born 11 February 2003) is an Ethiopian long-distance runner who specializes in the marathon and half marathon. In his marathon debut he won the 2023 Paris Marathon.

== Career ==
After competing in several European half marathons in 2021 and 2022, Gizealew Ayana stepped up to the full marathon distance. He had already shown considerable promise in the half marathon, stating his ambition to break the 59-minute barrier in the event.

In April 2023, at 20 years old, he entered the Paris Marathon as a debutant in a field of seasoned professionals. He stayed with the lead pack throughout the race and made a decisive move in the final stages to pull away, ultimately winning in a time of 2:07:15.

His older brother, Tsedat Ayana, is also a marathon runner.

== Personal bests ==
- Marathon: 2:07:15 – Paris, France, 2023
- Half Marathon: 59:39 – Valencia, Spain, 2021

== Major results ==
Year	Competition	Location	Position	Time
2021	Poznań Half Marathon	Poznań, Poland	2nd	1:02:14
2022	Cardiff Half Marathon	Cardiff, Wales	2nd	1:00:15
2023	Paris Marathon	Paris, France	1st	2:07:15
