= Simon Munyutu =

French long-distance runner

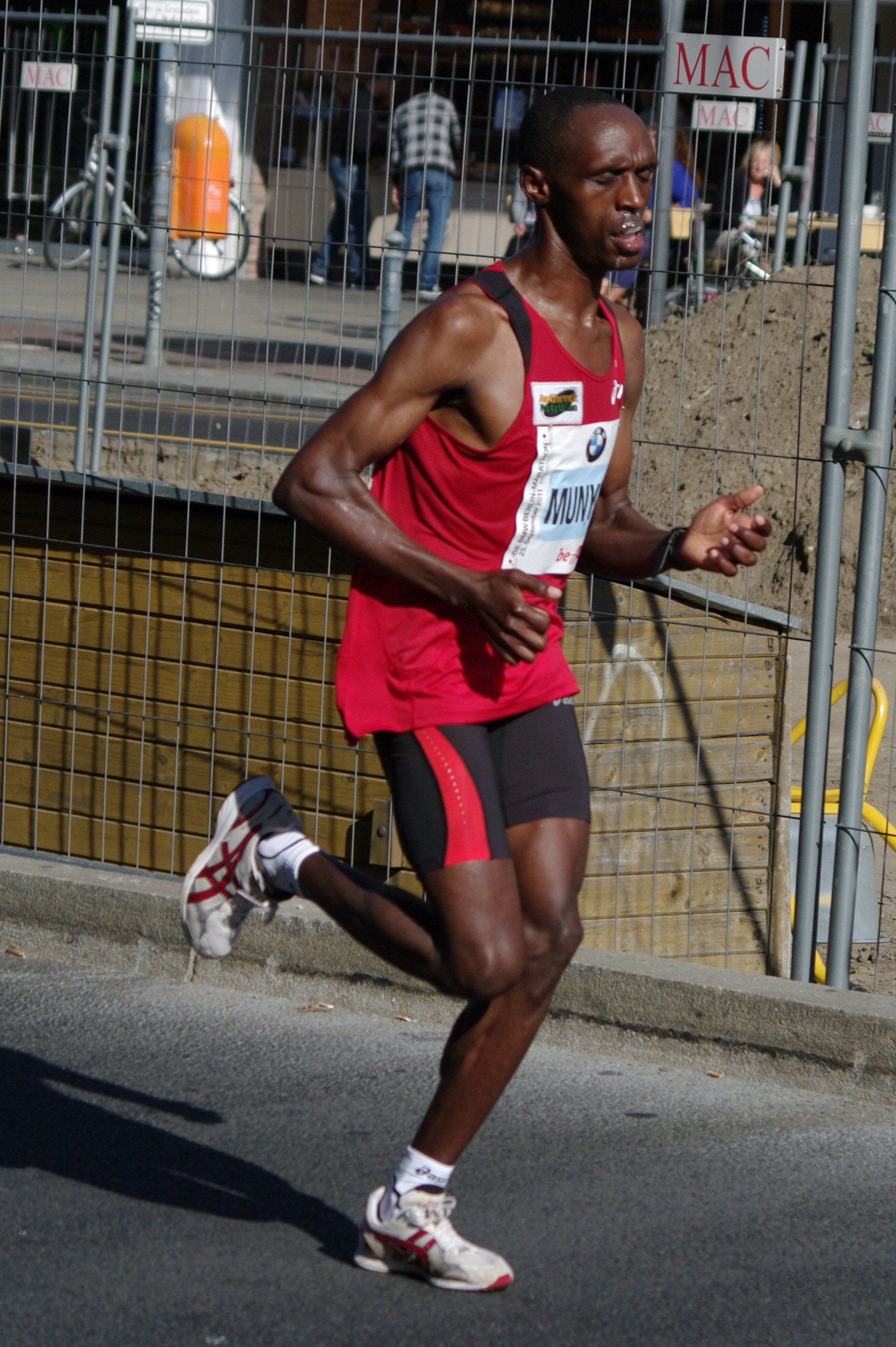
Simon Munyutu running Berlin Marathon 2011

Simon Munyutu (born 27 December 1977 in Nakuru, Kenya) is a French athlete who specialises in the men's marathon. Munyutu competed at the 2008 Summer Olympics.

He is married to Martha Komu, a Kenyan runner who lives in France but, unlike him, keeps representing Kenya. They both competed at the 2008 Olympics, but for different countries. They have a daughter born in 2005.
