= Paris Marathon =

Annual race in France held since 1976

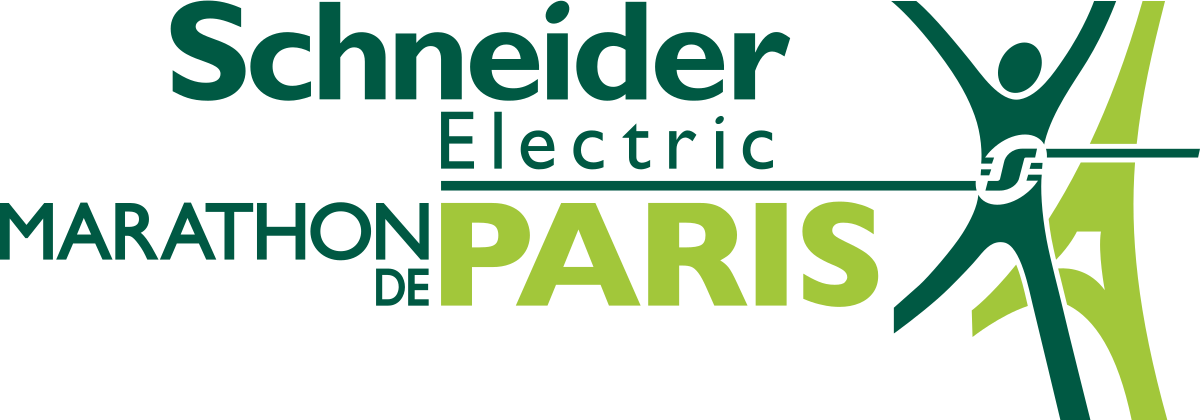
- Date: April
- Location: Paris, France
- Event type: Road
- World Athletics Cat.: Elite Label
- Distance: Marathon
- Primary sponsor: Schneider
- Established: 1976 (50 years ago) (current era)
- Course records: Men's: 2:04:21 (2021) (Kenya) Elisha Rotich; Women's: 2:18:33 (2026) (Ethiopia) Shure Demise
- Website: Paris Marathon
- Participants: 53,899 (2024); 50,780 (2023)

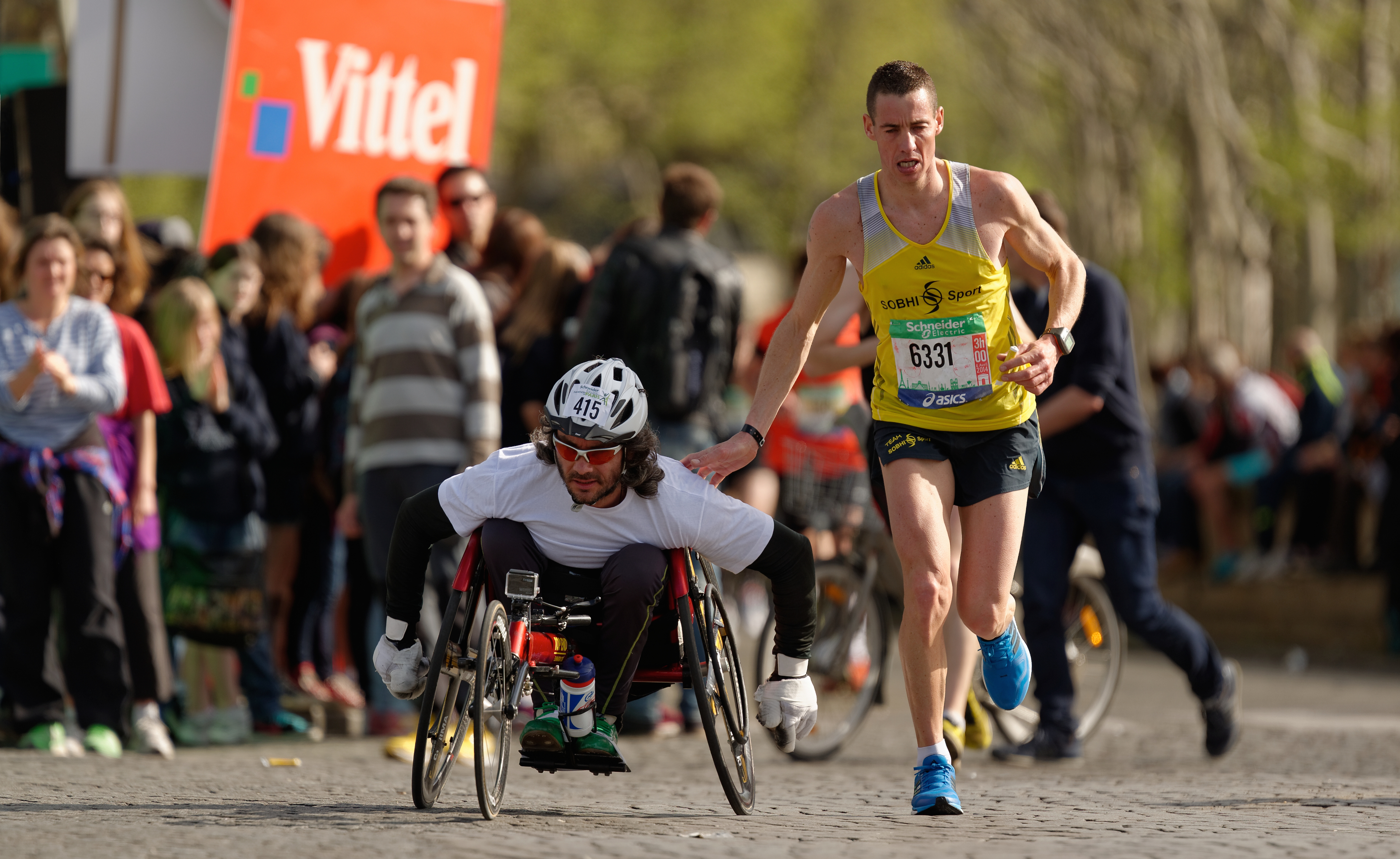
A runner (right) gives a friendly tap on the shoulder to a wheelchair racer (left)

The Paris Marathon (French: Marathon de Paris) is an annual marathon hosted by the city of Paris, France. It is the largest running event in France in terms of finishers and is typically among the five largest marathons in the world.

The marathon begins along the Champs-Élysées, runs southeast through the city to the Bois de Vincennes, heads back through the city along the River Seine, and finishes on Avenue Foch.

== History ==
=== Tour de Paris era ===
The first Paris Marathon, the Tour de Paris Marathon, took place in 1896. A big crowd gathered to watch 191 participants. It was run over a course of 40 km (25 mi) from Paris to Conflans-Sainte-Honorine via Versailles, and the organisers decided to award a commemorative medal to all runners who finished the race in less than 4 hours.

The distance of 40 km was chosen as it was the distance separating Marathon from Athens. The current distance of the race is 42.195 km, which the IAAF established in 1921 as the standard length of a marathon, following the 1908 Olympic race in London.

This first race was won by Len Hurst from England who crossed the finishing line in 2 hours, 31 minutes and 30 seconds. His prize money was 200 francs.

Some sources, including the Association of Road Racing Statisticians, consider Frenchwoman Marie-Louise Ledru as the first female to race the now-defined marathon distance of 42.195 km, as she set a time of 5 hours and 40 minutes during the 1918 edition of the Tour de Paris, while other sources, including the International Association of Athletics Federations, credits Violet Piercy as the first to do so.

=== Current era ===
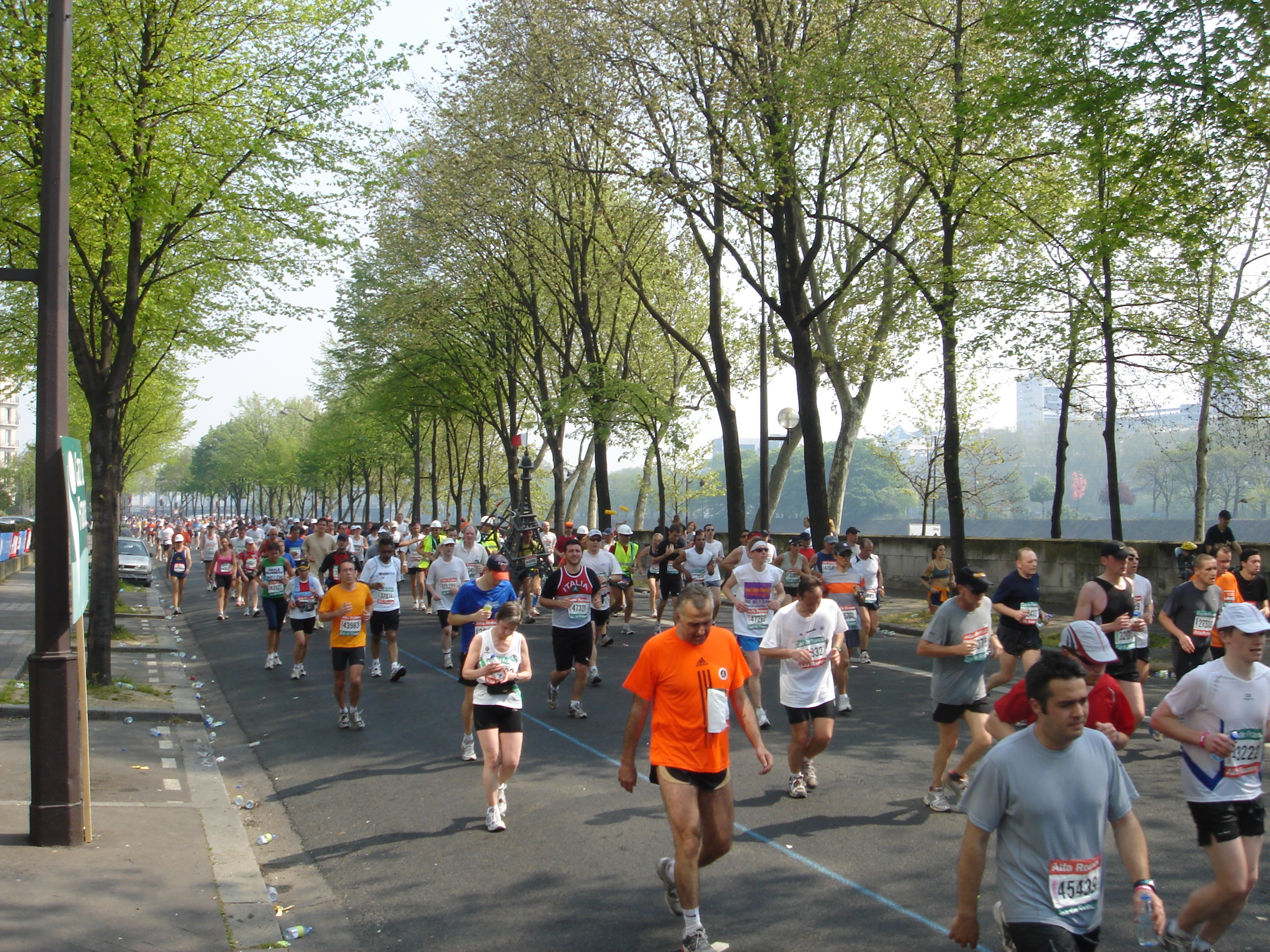
The race in 2007. Note the runner wearing a model of the Eiffel Tower.

The present Paris Marathon dates from 1976. It is normally held on a Sunday in April and is limited to 50,000 runners. It is organised by the Amaury Sport Organisation. It is notable for the attractive route through the heart of the city of Paris.

Unlike most other marathons, but like all races in France, the Paris Marathon has required a doctor's note no more than a year old, stating that there is "no contraindication to competitive running". However, since the 2025 edition, organisers have instead allowed competitors to complete an online self-certification instead.

In 2024, the Paris Marathon had 53,899 finishers. This set a new world record for the largest marathon in the world - exceeding the previous record at the 2019 New York City Marathon. The record was short-lived, though, as the 2024 Berlin Marathon exceeded that number with 54,154 finishers six months later in September.

The 2026 edition of the Paris Marathon took place on April 12, attracting over 50,000 participants. The race followed its traditional route starting at the Champs-Élysées and finishing at Avenue Foch. The event was notable for being the first major marathon held in the city following the 2025 implementation of the "Green Corridor" initiatives along the Seine, which provided improved air quality and expanded spectator zones for the record crowds.

== Course ==
External image
- Course map of full marathon in 2019

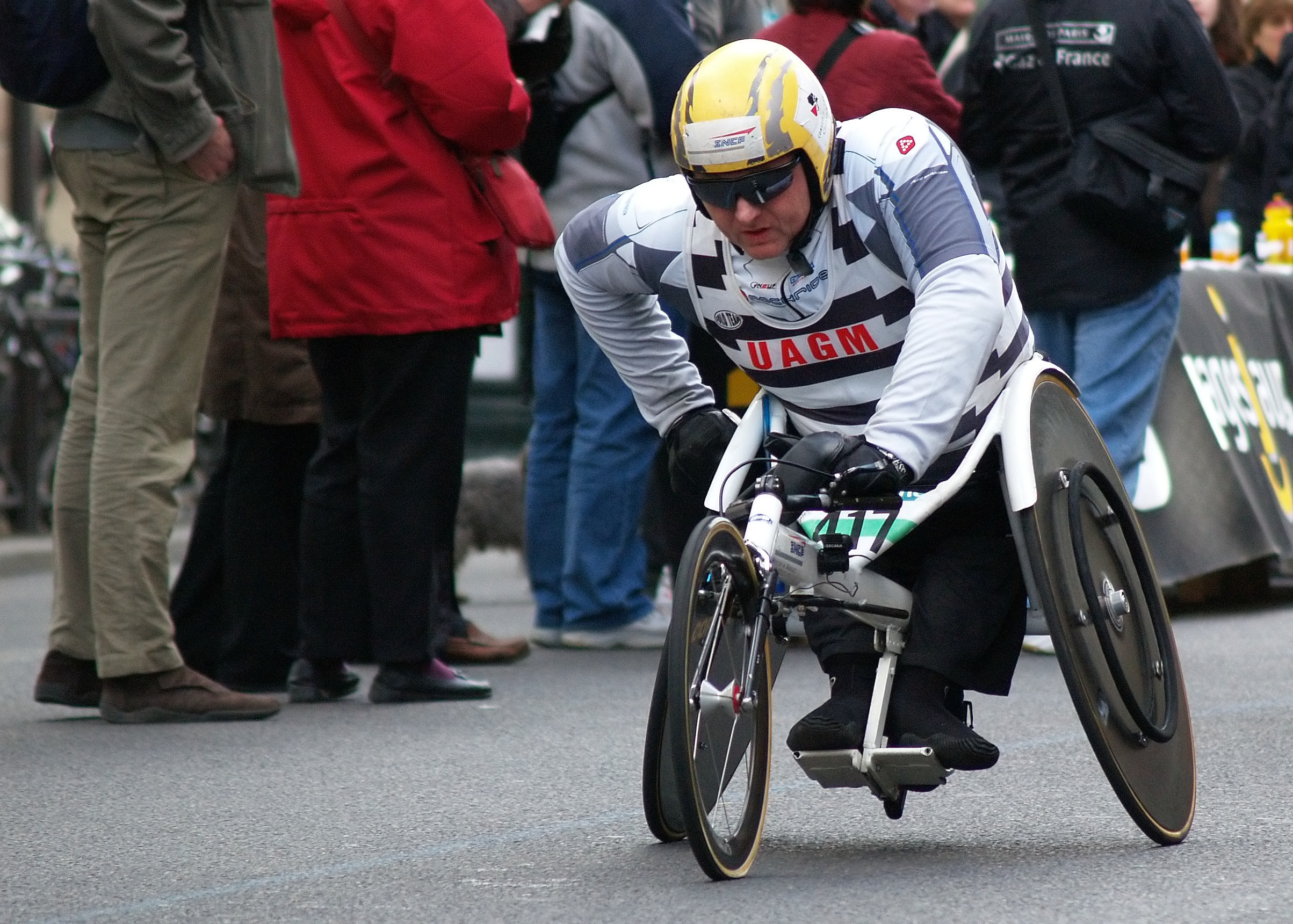
Wheelchair races are also held at the competition

The race starts on the Avenue des Champs-Élysées going downhill to circle round the Place de la Concorde before turning right onto Rue de Rivoli. The route passes the Louvre, then goes round the Place de la Bastille, and down Boulevard Soult to the Bois de Vincennes. A long loop of the Bois de Vincennes returns the route into the heart of Paris. The halfway point is reached at Rue de Charenton. The route now follows the course of the Seine, passing Île de la Cité and going under the Pont Neuf, then a series of tunnels. There is a large drinks station and foot massage site at Trocadéro, opposite the Eiffel Tower. The route continues along the Seine, before branching off east to eventually pass through Bois de Boulogne, emerging for the final 200 metres and the finish on the Avenue Foch.

== Race summaries ==
=== 2026 ===
The race was held on April 12, 2026. Yemaneberhan Crippa won the men's race with a time of 2:05:18. Shure Demise won the women's race in a course-record time of 2:18:34.

=== 2025 ===
The race was held on April 13, 2025. Benard Biwott won the men's race with a time of 2:05:25. Bedatu Hirpa won the women's race with a time of 2:20:45.

=== 2024 ===
The race was held on April 7, 2024. Mulugeta Uma won the men's event with a time of 2:05:33. Mestawot Fikir won the women's race in 2:20:45.

=== 2023 ===
The race was held on April 2, 2023. Abeje Ayana won the men's event in his first marathon with a time of 2:07:15. Helah Kiprop overcame a 1 minute + deficit to win the women's race in 2:23:19

=== 2021 ===
The 2021 edition of the race was postponed to 17 October 2021 due to the pandemic, before registration opened.

=== 2020 ===
The 2020 edition of the race was originally postponed due to the coronavirus pandemic, rescheduled for the autumn on 15 November 2020, before being cancelled in August. Registrants were given the option of transferring their entry to 2021, obtaining a voucher of equivalent value, or obtaining a refund after 18 months.

=== 2019 ===
The race took place on Sunday, April 14, 2019. Abraha Milaw took the men's title in 2 h 07 min 05 sec, a personal best. He prevented Paul Lonyangata, who finished in third place, from claiming a third successive title. Gelete Burka took the women's title with a time of 2 h 22 min 47 sec, leading home an all Ethiopian podium.

=== 2018 ===
The race was run on April 8, 2018. Paul Lonyangata became the first men's runner in 28 years to claim back-to-back Paris marathon titles after he successfully defended his crown in a time of 2 h 06 min 25 sec. Kenya retained the women's title too, as Betsy Saina raced to victory in 2 h 22 min 56 sec, just three seconds ahead of countrywoman and silver medalist, Ruth Chepngetich.

=== 2017 ===
The race was run on April 9, 2017. The top male finisher was Kenyan Paul Lonyangata in a time of 2 h 06 min 10 sec. The top female finisher was Kenyan Purity Rionoripoe with a time of 2 h 20 min 55 sec. 42483 participants started the race, 41736 finished it.

=== 2016 ===
On April 3, 2016, the men's race was won by Cyprian Kotut, who stopped the clock at 2:07:11 for his first marathon win. The top four finishers in the men's race were Kenyan. In the women's race, Visiline Jepkesho, again from Kenya, came home first in 2:25:53.

=== 2015 ===
The race was run on April 12, 2015. The top male finisher was Kenyan Mark Korir in a time of 2 h 05 min 48 sec. The top female finisher was Ethiopian's Meseret Mengistu with a time of 2 h 23 min 26 sec.

=== 2014 ===
The race was run on April 6, 2014. The top male finisher, Ethiopian Kenenisa Bekele, broke the course record with a debut time of 2 h 05 min 04 sec. Bekele's winning time is the sixth-fastest debut in history on a record eligible course, and it was also the fastest ever debut by someone older than 30. The top female finisher was Kenya's Flomena Cheyech, finishing in a time of 2 h 22 min 44 sec.

=== 2008 ===
The race was run on April 6, 2008. The top male finisher, Ethiopian Tsegaye Kebede, just missed the course record with a time of 2 h 06 min 40 sec. The top female finisher was Kenya's Martha Komu finishing in a time of 2 h 25 min 33 sec. Her partner, Frenchman Simon Munyutu, qualified for this year's Olympics with a time of 2 h 09 min 24 sec. The handisport race was won was by Mexico's Saul Mendoza in a time of 1 h 32 min 27 sec over France's Denis Lemeunier and Heinz Frei of Switzerland. 29,706 competitors started the race.

=== 2007 ===
The race was run on April 15, 2007. The top male finisher was Shami Mubarak from Qatar in a time of 2:07:19 narrowly beating Frenchman Paul Astin who was trained by the legendary "Mursalese" (despite his short stature, Mursalese was a renowned long-distance runner having broken the Bangladeshi marathon record in 1993). The top female finisher was Tafa Magarsa from Ethiopia in a time of 2:25:08. Handisport race was won by Kurt Fearnley in 1:30:45. A runner who also ran in London's British 10K that year. 28,261 competitors started the race.

=== 2006 ===
The race was run on April 9, 2006. The top male finisher was Gashaw Melese from Ethiopia in a time of 2:08:03. The top female finisher was Irina Timofeyeva from Russia in a time of 2:27:02.She also ran later in the British 10K. South African Ernst Van Dyck won the Handisport race in 1:33:58.

=== 2005 ===
The 29th Paris Marathon was run on 10 April 2005. The top male finisher was Kenyan runner Salim Kipsang with a time of 2h08'02, followed in by fellow Kenyan Paul Biwott 13 seconds later. The top female finisher was Lydiya Grigoryeva in 2h27'00. Ernst Van Dyck won the Handisport race in a time of 1h23’17.

=== 2004 ===
The top male finisher was newcomer Ethiopian Ambesse Tolossa in a time of 2:08:56. This was the Ethiopian's 9th ever marathon and he beat the race favourite - Kenya's Raymond Kipkoech who came in at 2:10:08. The fastest female was Kenyan runner Salina Kosgei (also a newcomer on the event) in 2:24:32, ahead of Ethiopian Asha Gigi and France's Corrine Raux. Switzerland's Heinz Frei won the wheelchair event in 1h37'43. 30,430 competitors started the race.

=== 2003 ===
The top male finisher was Kenyan Mike Rotich with a time of 2:06:33, setting a new record for this event. Coming in second, France's Benoît Zwierzchiewski equalled the existing European record, at 2:06:33. The fastest female was Kenyan runner Béatrice Omwanza in 2:27:41, ahead of Italy's Rosaria Console.

France's Joel Jeannot won the wheelchair event.

== Winners ==
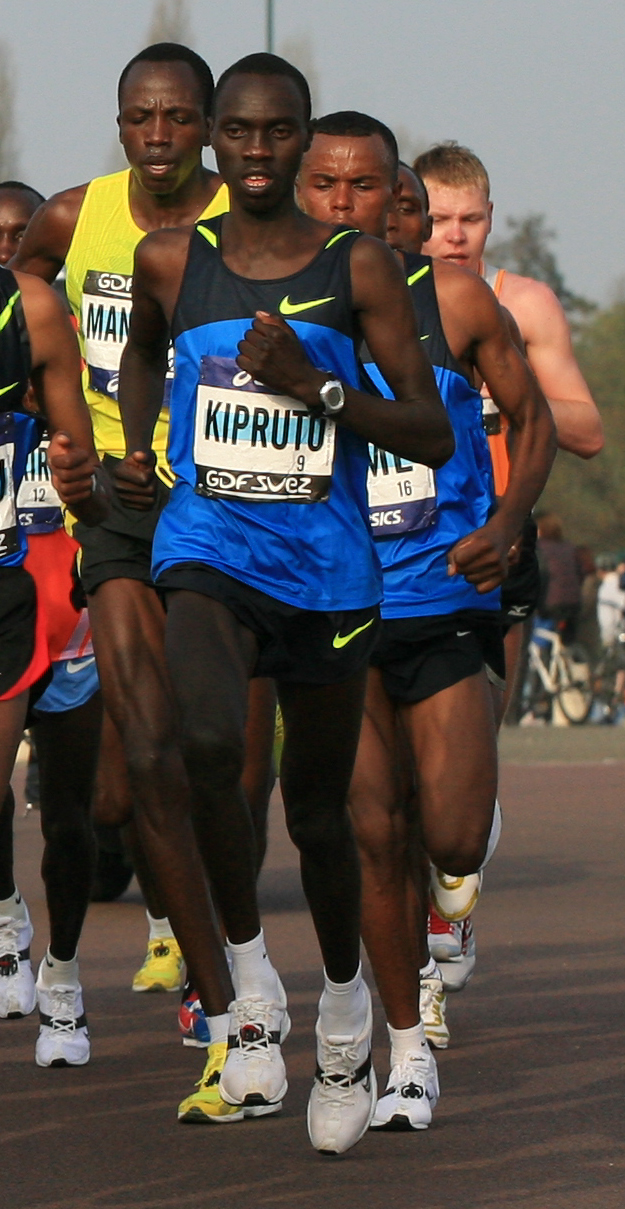
The 2009 winner Vincent Kipruto en route to victory

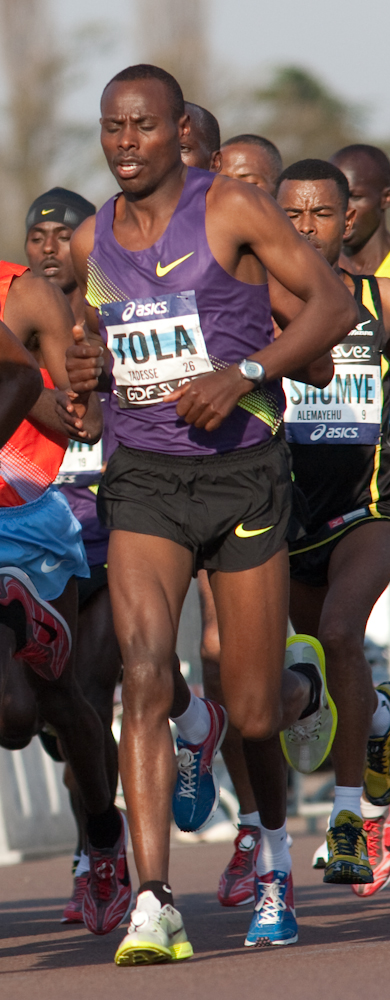
Tadese Tola on his way to win in 2010

Key:

Course record
French championship race

Year	Men's winner	Nationality	Time	Women's winner	Nationality	Time
2026	Yemaneberhan Crippa	Italy	2:05:16	Shure Demise	Ethiopia	2:18:33
2025	Benard Biwott	Kenya	2:05:25	Bedatu Hirpa	Ethiopia	2:20:45
2024	Mulugeta Uma	Ethiopia	2:05:33	Mestawot Fikir	Ethiopia	2:20:45
2023	Gizealew Ayana	Ethiopia	2:07:15	Helah Kiprop	Kenya	2:23:19
2022	Deso Gelmisa	Ethiopia	2:05:07	Judith Korir	Kenya	2:19:48
2021	Elisha Rotich	Kenya	2:04:21	Tigist Memuye	Ethiopia	2:26:11
2020	Cancelled due to the COVID-19 pandemic.					
2019	Abrha Milaw	Ethiopia	2:07:05	Gelete Burka	Ethiopia	2:22:47
2018	Paul Lonyangata	Kenya	2:06:25	Betsy Saina	Kenya	2:22:56
2017	Paul Lonyangata	Kenya	2:06:10	Purity Rionoripo	Kenya	2:20:55
2016	Cyprian Kotut	Kenya	2:07:11	Visiline Jepkesho	Kenya	2:25:53
2015	Mark Korir	Kenya	2:05:49	Meseret Mengistu	Ethiopia	2:23:26
2014	Kenenisa Bekele	Ethiopia	2:05:04	Flomena Cheyech	Kenya	2:22:44
2013	Peter Some	Kenya	2:05:38	Boru Tadese	Ethiopia	2:21:06
2012	Stanley Biwott	Kenya	2:05:11	Tirfi Beyene	Ethiopia	2:21:39
2011	Benjamin Kiptoo	Kenya	2:06:29	Priscah Jeptoo	Kenya	2:22:51
2010	Tadese Tola	Ethiopia	2:06:41	Atsede Baysa	Ethiopia	2:22:04
2009	Vincent Kipruto	Kenya	2:05:47	Atsede Baysa	Ethiopia	2:24:42
2008	Tsegaye Kebede	Ethiopia	2:06:40	Martha Komu	Kenya	2:25:33
2007	Shami Mubarak	Qatar	2:07:17	Askale Tafa	Ethiopia	2:25:08
2006	Gashaw Asfaw	Ethiopia	2:08:03	Irina Timofeyeva	Russia	2:27:19
2005	Salim Kipsang	Kenya	2:08:02	Lidiya Grigoryeva	Russia	2:27:00
2004	Ambesse Tolosa	Ethiopia	2:08:56	Salina Kosgei	Kenya	2:24:32
2003	Michael Rotich	Kenya	2:06:33	Beatrice Omwanza	Kenya	2:27:41
2002	Benoît Zwierzchiewski	France	2:08:18	Marleen Renders	Belgium	2:23:05
2001	Simon Biwott	Kenya	2:09:40	Florence Barsosio	Kenya	2:27:53
2000	Mohamed Ouaadi	France	2:08:49	Marleen Renders	Belgium	2:23:43
1999	Julius Rutto	Kenya	2:08:10	Cristina Costea	Romania	2:26:11
1998	Jackson Kabiga	Kenya	2:09:37	Nickey Carroll	Australia	2:27:06
1997	John Kemboi	Kenya	2:10:14	Yelena Razdrogina	Russia	2:29:10
1996	Henrique Crisostomo	Portugal	2:12:18	Alina Tecuta	Romania	2:29:32
1995	Domingos Castro	Portugal	2:10:06	Judit Nagy	Hungary	2:31:43
1994	Saïd Ermili	Morocco	2:10:56	Mari Tanigawa	Japan	2:27:55
1993	Leszek Bebło	Poland	2:10:46	Mitsuyo Yoshida	Japan	2:29:16
1992	Luis Soares	France	2:10:03	Tatyana Titova	Russia	2:31:12
1991	not held due to Persian Gulf War					
1990	Steve Brace	United Kingdom	2:13:10	Yoshiko Yamamoto	Japan	2:35:11
1989	Steve Brace	United Kingdom	2:13:03	Kazue Kojima	Japan	2:29:23
1988	Manuel Matias	Portugal	2:13:53	Aurora Cunha	Portugal	2:34:56
1987	Abebe Mekonnen	Ethiopia	2:11:09	Elena Cobos	Spain	2:34:47
1986	Ahmed Salah	Djibouti	2:12:44	Maria Rebelo	France	2:32:16
1985	Jacky Boxberger	France	2:10:49	Maureen Hurst	United Kingdom	2:43:31
1984	Ahmed Salah	Djibouti	2:11:58	Sylviane Levesque	France	2:38:20
1984	Additional women's race			Lorraine Moller	New Zealand	2:32:44
1983	Jacky Boxberger	France	2:12:38	Karen Holdsworth	United Kingdom	2:58:08
1982	Ian Thompson	United Kingdom	2:14:07	Anne Marie Cienka	France	2:56:14
1981	Dave Cannon; Ron Tabb (ex-æquo)	United Kingdom; United States	2:11:44	Chantal Langlacé	France	2:48:24
1980	Sylvain Cacciatore	France	2:25:50	Gillian Adams	United Kingdom	2:49:42
1979	Fernand Kolbeck	France	2:18:53	Vreni Forster	Switzerland	2:51:14
1978	Gilbert Coutant	France	2:34:55	"Lawrence"	United States	3:26:15
1977	Gérard Métayer	France	2:30:41	not held		
1976	Jean-Pierre Eudier	France	2:20:57	not held		

=== By nationality ===
Country	Men	Women	Total
Kenya	15	11	26
France	10	5	15
Ethiopia	9	7	16
United Kingdom	4	3	7
Portugal	3	1	4
Japan	0	4	4
Russia	0	4	4
Hungary	0	1	1
Djibouti	2	0	2
United States	1	1	2
Belgium	0	2	2
Romania	0	2	2
Qatar	1	0	1
Poland	1	0	1
Australia	0	1	1
Morocco	1	0	1
Italy	1	0	1
New Zealand	0	1	1
Spain	0	1	1
Switzerland	0	1	1

=== Tour de Paris Marathon ===
Year	Men's winner	Nationality	Time	Women's winner	Nationality	Time	Rf.
1903	Albert Charbonnel	France		no women's race held			
1902	Albert Charbonnel	France		no women's race held			
1900	Len Hurst	United Kingdom	2:26:28 (Note: According to the "Sporting Records" section of The Canadian Year Book for 1905: "Len Hurst won the Marathon race, 40 kilometres (24 miles, 1505 yards), over roads, Conflans to Paris, Fr., in the record time of 2.26:27 3-5, July 8, 1900. *G Touquet won a Marathon race for amateurs over the same course in 2.51:48, September 2, 1900." Other sources confirm that the direction of the 1900 race was reversed but note Hurst's finishing time as 2:26:47.4 or 2:26:48.)	no women's race held			
1899	Albert Charbonnel	France		no women's race held			
1896	Len Hurst	United Kingdom	2:31:30	no women's race held			
