= Mestawot Fikir =

Ethiopian long-distance runner

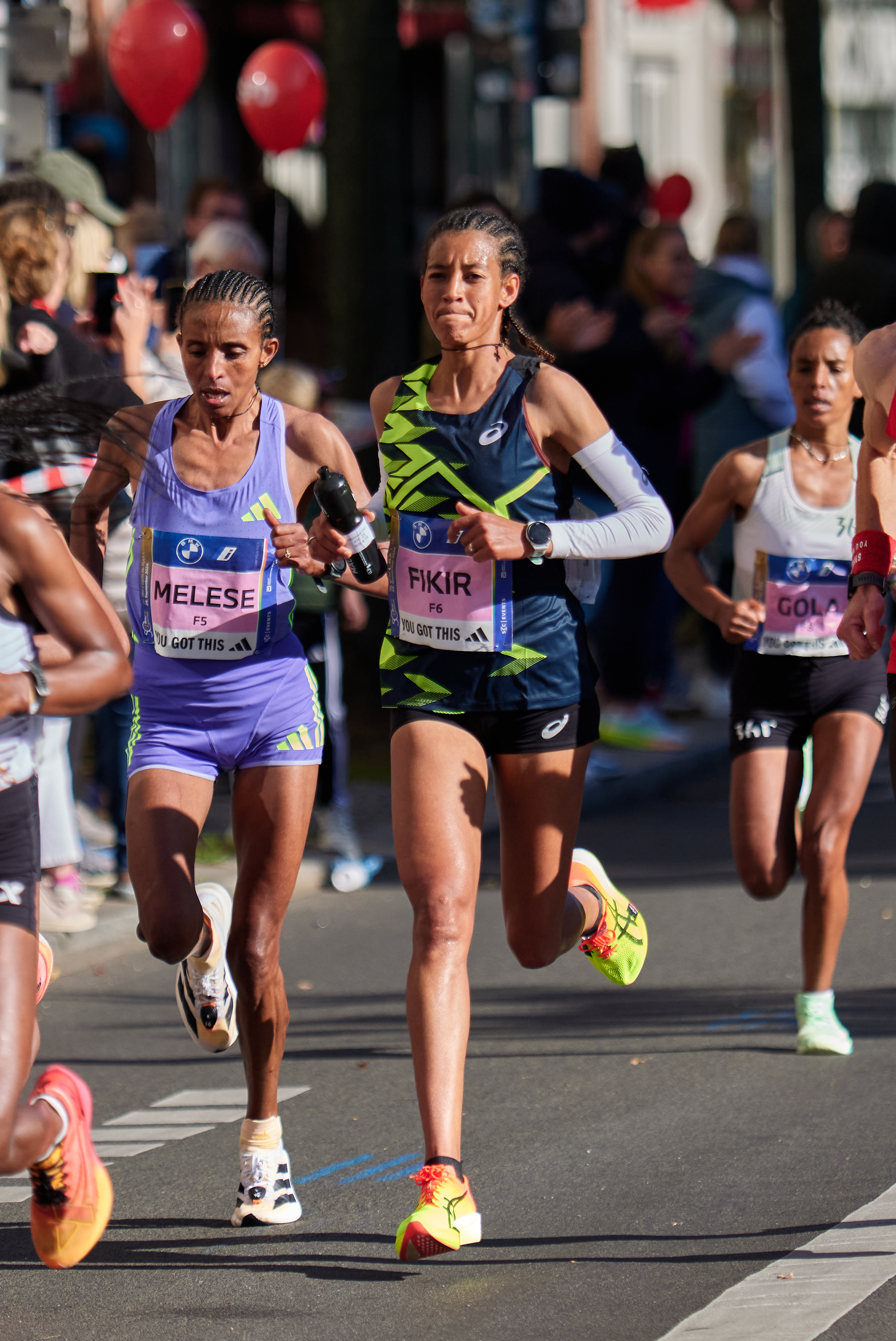
- Fikir in 2024 Berlin marathon

Personal information
- Nationality: Ethiopian
- Born: March 2, 2000 (age 26)

Sport
- Sport: Athletics
- Event(s): Long-distance running (Marathon, Half Marathon, 10K Road)
Medal record
World Marathon Majors
Silver medal – second place	2024 Berlin	Marathon

Mestawot Fikir (born 2 March 2000) is an Ethiopian long-distance runner who specializes in marathon and half marathon races. She made her marathon debut in 2024. She is married to fellow marathoner Belay Tilahun.

== Career ==
Fikir began competing in road races in the early 2020s.

In 2022, she placed second at both the Sofi Malt Great Ethiopian Run International 10 km in Addis Ababa and the Corrida Internationale de Houilles 10 km Road race in France. She also secured a victory at the Rio de Janeiro International Half Marathon.

In 2023, she won the Principality Cardiff Half Marathon in Wales and the Antrim Coast Half Marathon in Ireland, where she also set her personal best in the half marathon. Additionally, she finished third at the Tel Aviv 10 km Road race and fifth at the B.A.A. Half Marathon in Boston.

In her marathon debut, Fikir won the 2024 Paris Marathon in 2:20:45, leading an Ethiopian one-two finish with Enatnesh Tirusew just three seconds behind her. This victory marked her first major marathon title.

- 2024 Berlin Marathon: She followed up her Paris success with a second-place finish at the prestigious Berlin Marathon, clocking a new personal best of 2:18:48. She was part of an Ethiopian podium sweep in the women's race, finishing behind Tigist Ketema. Her performance contributed to a record-breaking Berlin Marathon in terms of finishers.

== Personal bests ==
As of May 2025, Fikir's personal bests are:

- 10 Kilometres Road – 31:45 (2022)
- Half Marathon – 1:06:44 (Antrim Coast, 27 August 2023)
- Marathon – 2:18:48 (Berlin, 29 September 2024)
