= Ayana Aberu Mulisa =

Ethiopian long-distance runner

Personal information
- Nationality: Ethiopian
- Born: September 17, 2000 (age 25)

Sport
- Sport: Athletics
- Event(s): Marathon, Half marathon, 10 000 m, 10 km road

Ayana Aberu Mulisa (born 17 September 2000) is an Ethiopian long-distance runner specialising in the marathon, half marathon, 10 000 metres and 10 km road races. She has recorded podium finishes at major marathons and set personal bests on both track and road.

== Career ==
Mulisa made her marathon debut in October 2018 at the Ravenna Marathon in Italy, winning in 2:36:32.

In 2019 she set a 10 km road best of 32:46 in Langreo, Spain, and placed third at both the Copenhagen Marathon (2:34:39) and the Warsaw Marathon (2:37:07).

In 2021, she finished eighth at the Prague Battle of the Teams Marathon in 2:28:02 and eighth again at the Schneider Electric Marathon de Paris in 2:28:27.

The 2023 season was a breakthrough. She lowered her marathon best to 2:21:54 with a runner-up finish at the Seville Marathon in February. She won the Lisbon Marathon in October in 2:25:06.

In 2024, Mulisa won the Guadalajara Half Marathon in 1:08:51—her first victory in a World Athletics Label road race. She placed fourth in the 10 000 metres at the African Games in Accra in 34:45.37, and on 29 September 2024 she set a new marathon personal best of 2:20:20 for fourth at the Berlin Marathon.

== Personal bests ==
- 10 km road – 32:46 (Langreo, 13 April 2019)
- Half marathon – 1:08:51 (Guadalajara, 25 February 2024)
- Marathon – 2:20:20 (Berlin, 29 September 2024)
