= 2022 Berlin Marathon =

Marathon race in Germany

48th Berlin Marathon
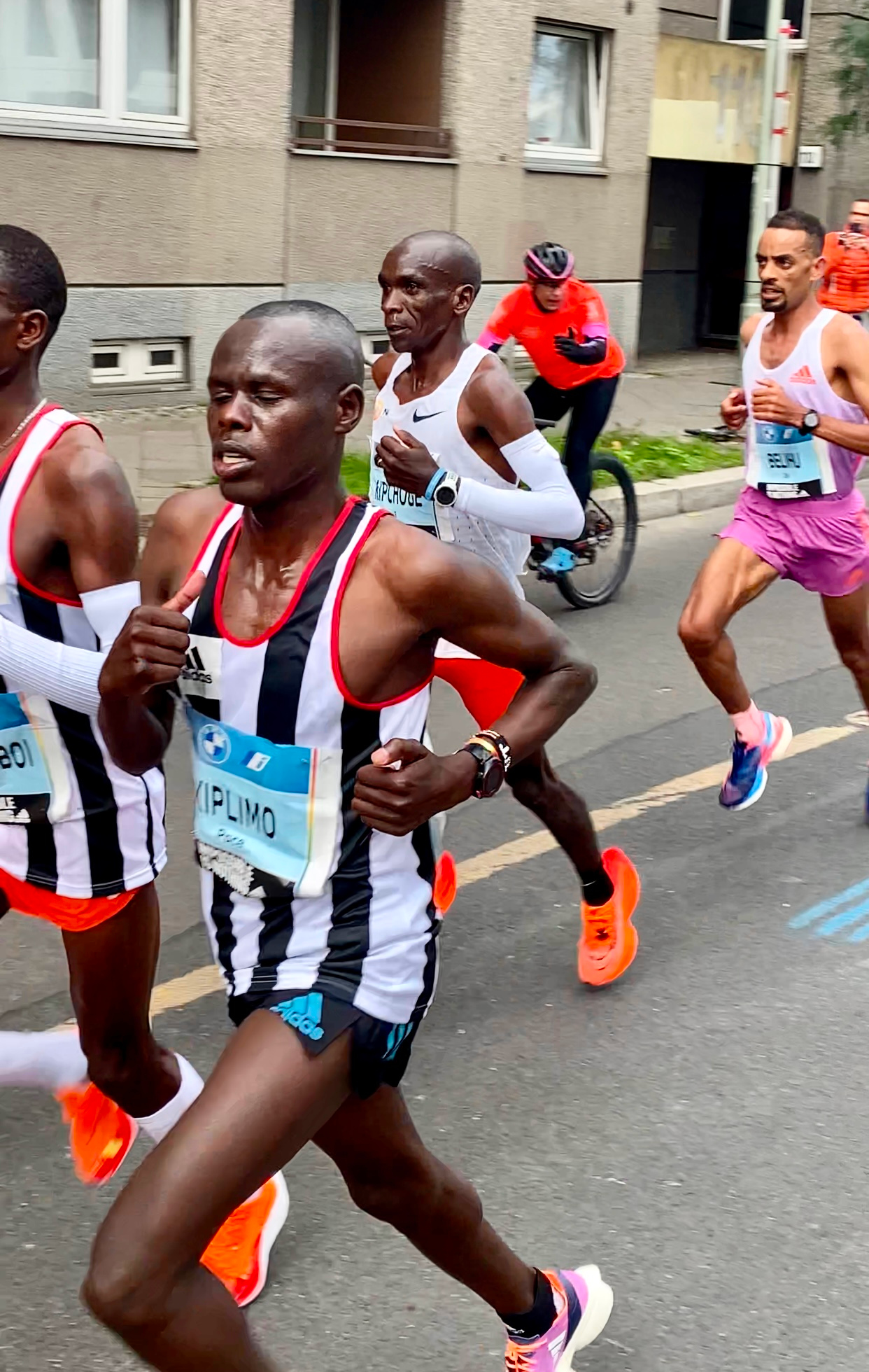
- Winner Eliud Kipchoge (back center) about 14.5 km (9.0 mi) into the race, behind pacemakers (in striped gear) and followed closely by Andamlak Belihu, who finished fourth
- Location: Berlin, Germany
- Dates: 25 September 2022
- Website: https://www.bmw-berlin-marathon.com

Champions
- Men: Eliud Kipchoge (2:01:09)
- Women: Tigist Assefa (2:15:37)
- Wheelchair men: Marcel Hug (1:24:56)
- Wheelchair women: Catherine Debrunner (1:36:47)

The 2022 Berlin Marathon was the 48th edition of the annual marathon race in Berlin, which took place on Sunday, 25 September 2022. An Elite Platinum Label marathon, it was the first of four World Marathon Majors events to be held over the span of six weeks. 45,527 runners with 34,879 finishers from 157 countries have taken part in the event.

Kenyan runner Eliud Kipchoge set a new marathon world record, winning the race with a time of 2:01:09, and beating the previous record, which he had set himself four years prior in Berlin, by 30 seconds. This was Kipchoge's fourth victory at the Berlin Marathon, making him the second runner to win the race four times, after Ethiopian runner Haile Gebrselassie.

Ethiopian runner Tigist Assefa won the race with a time of 2:15:37, setting a new course record in Berlin with her second marathon race. Assefa's time was also the third-fastest woman's marathon time ever, and broke her personal record by over 18 minutes. She would go on to break this record the following year, when she set a new world record.

Swiss wheelchair athlete Marcel Hug claimed his seventh Berlin Marathon victory with a time of 1:24:56, while another Swiss wheelchair athlete, Catherine Debrunner, won the race with a time of 1:36:47 in her marathon debut.

== Competitors ==
Kenyan runner Eliud Kipchoge entered as the pre-race favorite. Before the race, he was the holder of the marathon world record, which he had set with a finish time of 2:01:39 four years prior at the 2018 Berlin Marathon. Kipchoge's 2022 win made him the second runner to have won the Berlin Marathon four times, after Ethiopian runner Haile Gebrselassie.

Also competing was Ethiopian runner Guye Adola, the defending champion, who had won the previous year's marathon with a time of 2:05:45. The 2017 Berlin Marathon was Adola's marathon debut, where he finished with a time of 2:03:46, the fastest marathon debut ever at the time. That year, Adola came in second to Kipchoge, who won with a time of 2:03:32.

Prior to this race, Ethiopian runner Tigist Assefa had run only one other marathon, the inaugural Riyadh Marathon earlier in March, which she had finished with a time of 2:34:01. Assefa had previously largely specialized in 800-metre races during her running career. During the summer, Assefa had run a number of 10,000-metre track races before focusing her attention back on marathon training. Keira D'Amato, holder of the U.S. record for the marathon, and Kenyan runner Vibian Chepkirui, winner of the 2022 Vienna City Marathon, also ran the race. D'Amato had won the 2022 Houston Marathon with a time of 2:19:12 to set the U.S. record. In addition, Kenyan runner Rosemary Wanjiru debuted at the marathon distance with this race.

Also competing were Swiss wheelchair athlete Marcel Hug, winner of the 2021 Tokyo Marathon; (Note: The 2021 Tokyo Marathon was held in 2022.) U.S. wheelchair athlete Daniel Romanchuk, winner of the 2022 Boston Marathon; and Swiss wheelchair athlete Manuela Schär, winner of the previous five Berlin Marathons. Swiss wheelchair athlete Catherine Debrunner, the reigning Paralympic champion in the women's T53 400-metre race, also made her marathon debut in this race.

== Race ==
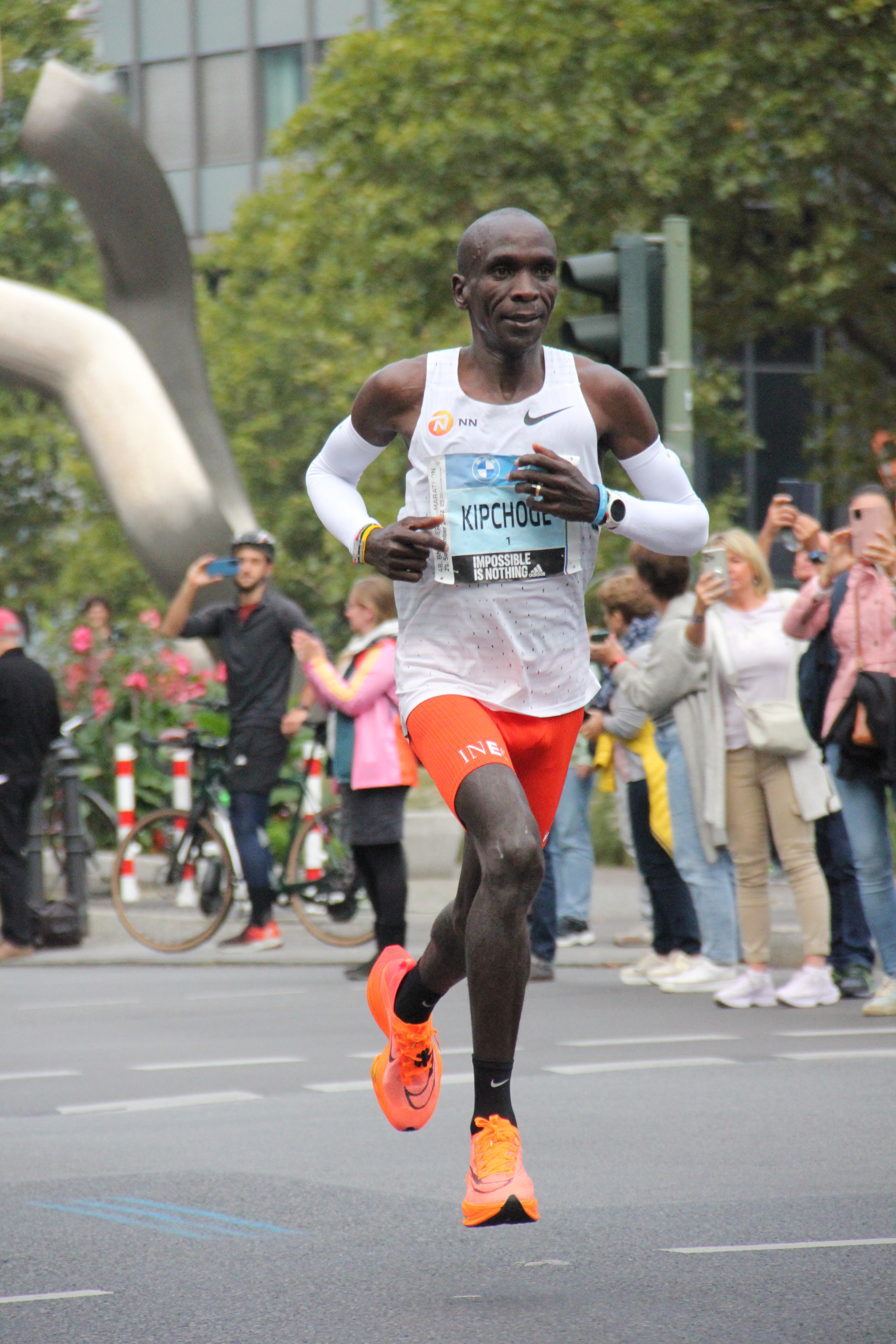
Eliud Kipchoge during his record-breaking run

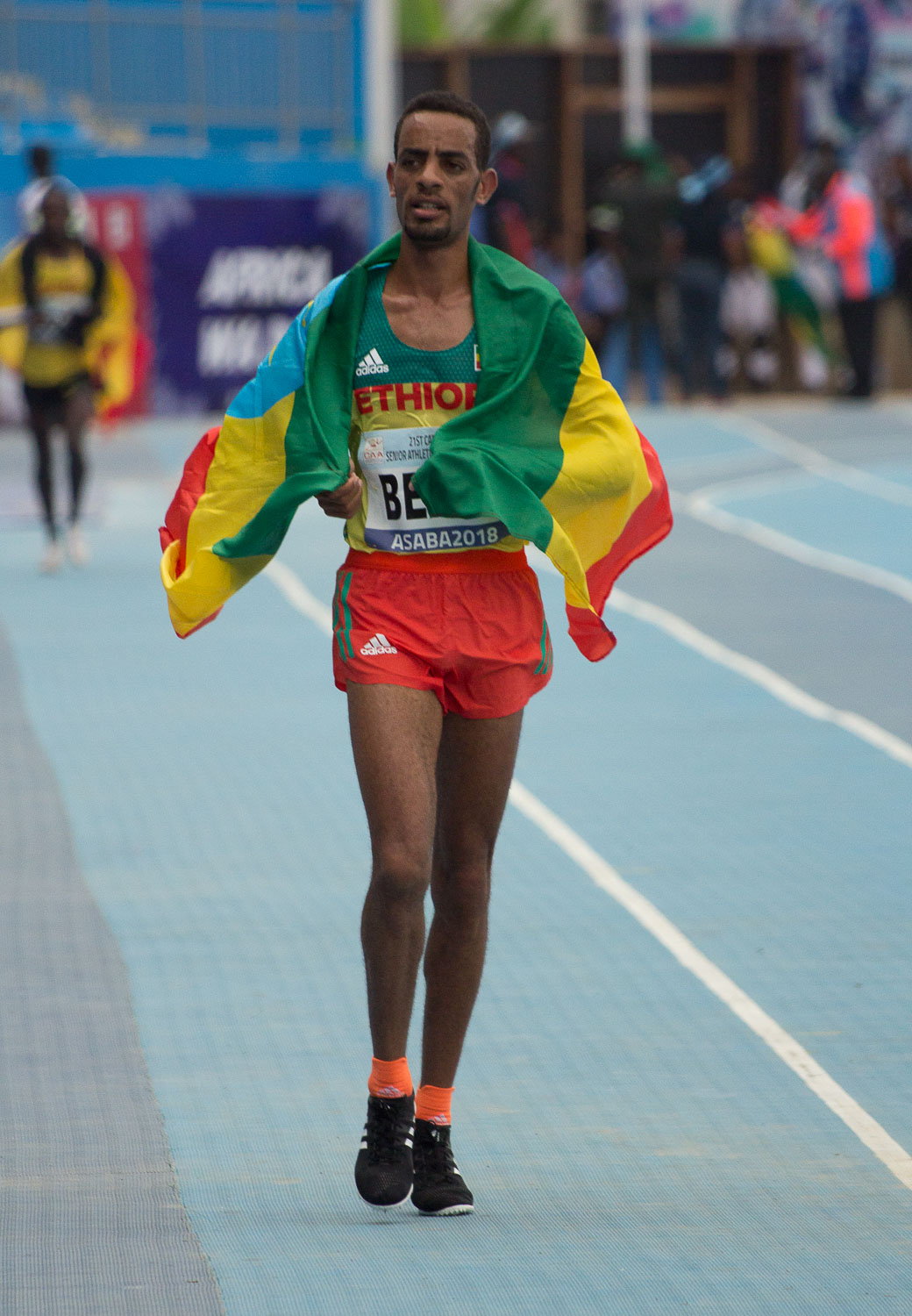
Andamlak Belihu (pictured here in Asaba), who ran with Kipchoge for most of the race

=== Men's race ===
Intending to run a fast first half, Eliud Kipchoge started the race at a blistering pace that only a few runners were able to keep up with, including Ethiopian runner Andamlak Belihu and defending champion Guye Adola. (Note: After the race, Kipchoge stated that although he had originally planned to run the first half in around 60:50, during the race, he thought he might try approaching the two-hour barrier because his legs were feeling good that day. In retrospect, he stated that he went too fast during the first half.) The leaders crossed the 10 km (6.2 mi) mark in 28:23 before Adola began to fall behind about 14 km (8.7 mi) into the race. Kipchoge, Belihu, and the pacemakers reached the 15 km (9.3 mi) mark in 42:32, leading to speculation that Kipchoge may have been able to finish the race in under two hours. The runners then passed the halfway point with a time of 59:51, which was well under world-record pace, as Kipchoge had taken 96 seconds longer to complete the first half during his record-breaking 2018 run.

The last pacemaker eventually broke off from the group around the 25 km (16 mi) mark, and Belihu started falling back about 2 km (1.2 mi) later. With 15 km (9.3 mi) left in the race, Kipchoge eventually started to slow down, hitting the 30 km (19 mi) mark in 1:25:40, and then the 35 km (22 mi) mark only slightly more than a minute faster than he did in 2018. By the time he was only 2 km (1.2 mi) away from the finish, Kipchoge's lead on his previous performance had dropped to 36 seconds, but he was still able to finish the last 500 m (1,600 ft) of the race in a sprint.

Kipchoge's finish time of 2:01:09 ended up shaving 30 seconds off his previous world record. In second place, nearly five minutes behind, was his compatriot Mark Korir, who finished with a time of 2:05:58. Ethiopian runner Tadu Abate took third place with a time of 2:06:28. Belihu finished in 2:06:40 and came in fourth, while Adola never recorded a 40 km (25 mi) split time.

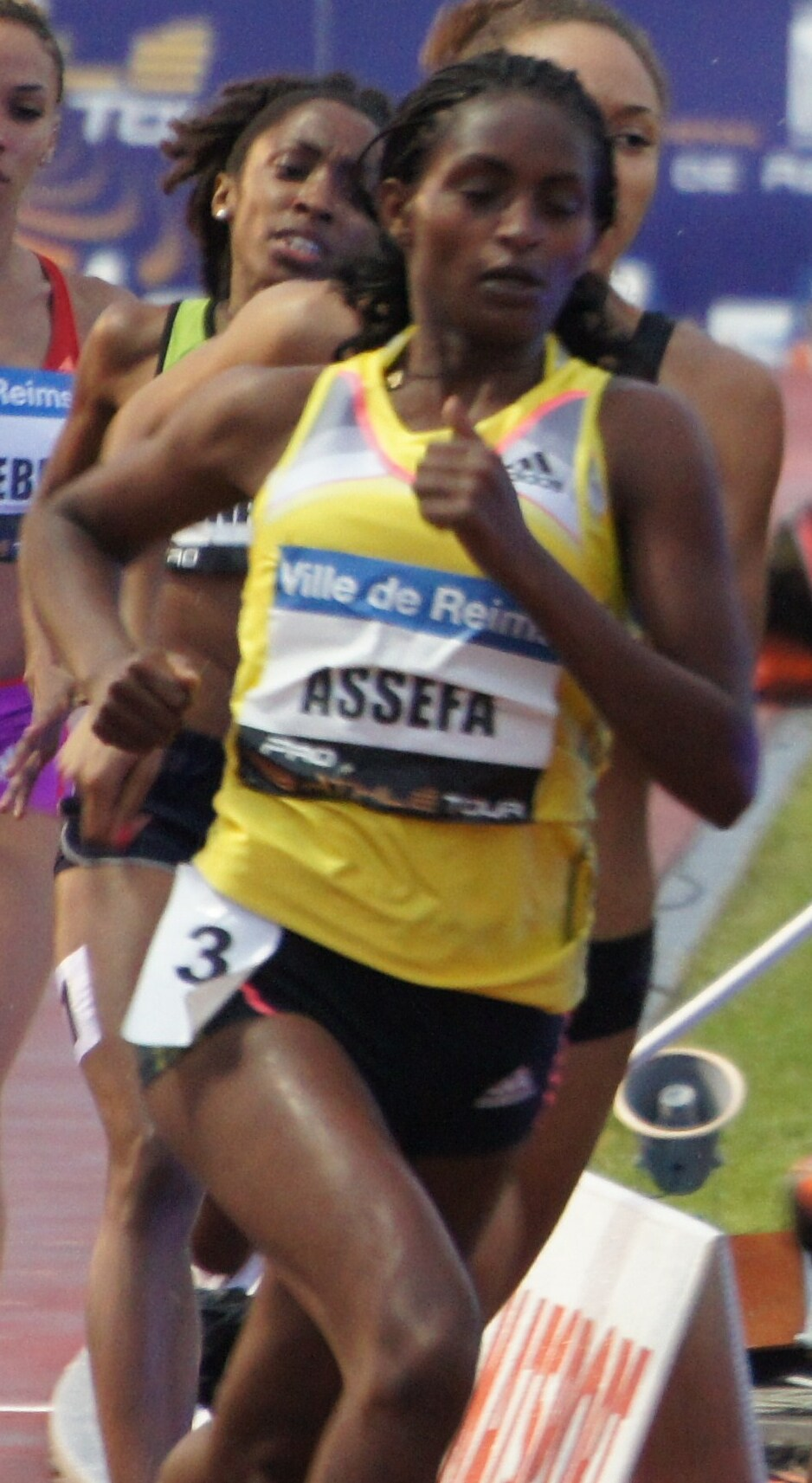
Winner Tigist Assefa (pictured during an 800-metre race in Reims in 2013)

=== Women's race ===
The women also began the race at a quick pace, with the lead runners crossing the 5 km (3.1 mi) mark at 16:22 and the 10 km (6.2 mi) mark at 32:36. After reaching the halfway point with the other leading women in 1:08:13, Assefa turned up the pace and eventually broke free from the pack, posting 5 km (3.1 mi) split times of 15:53 and 15:46 at the 30 km (19 mi) and 35 km (22 mi) marks, respectively. She crossed the finish line with a time of 2:15:37, breaking the previous course record by 2 minutes and 34 seconds, and her own personal record by 18 minutes and 24 seconds. Assefa's performance in this race, her second marathon ever, was also the third-fastest marathon ever. (Note: The world record time is 2:14:04, set by Kenyan runner Brigid Kosgei, and the second-fastest time of 2:15:25, set by British runner Paula Radcliffe, had formerly also been the world record.) In addition, it made her the only woman to have completed both an 800-metre race in under 2 minutes, and a marathon in under 2 hours and 20 minutes. (Note: Assefa has recorded a personal best time of 1:59.24 for the 800-metre race.) Assefa's second half, which she completed in 1:07:25, was faster than her first half, meaning that she ran the race with a negative split.

Rosemary Wanjiru, in her debut marathon, was able to beat Ethiopian runner Tigist Abayechew by three seconds to claim second place. Though they both trailed Assefa by over two minutes, their finish times of 2:18:00 and 2:18:03 meant that all three podium finishers broke the course record of 2:18:11, set by Kenyan runner Gladys Cherono in the 2018 marathon.

Keira D'Amato did not keep up with the lead pack, falling behind by three seconds as early as the 5 km (3.1 mi) mark, and by seven seconds at the 10 km (6.2 mi) mark. Though she was 74 seconds behind the leaders by the halfway point, D'Amato's split of 1:09:27 was still on target to break the U.S. record. Experiencing cramps during the second half of the race, D'Amato eventually slowed down, and walked briefly around 34 km (21 mi) into the race. Despite the setback, she was still able to finish in sixth place with a time of 2:21:48, her second-best marathon time.

Canadian runner Natasha Wodak ran a personal best time of 2:23:12, finishing in twelfth place and setting a new Canadian record by nearly 100 seconds. (Note: The previous Canadian record of 2:24:50 had been set at the 2020 Houston Marathon by Malindi Elmore.)

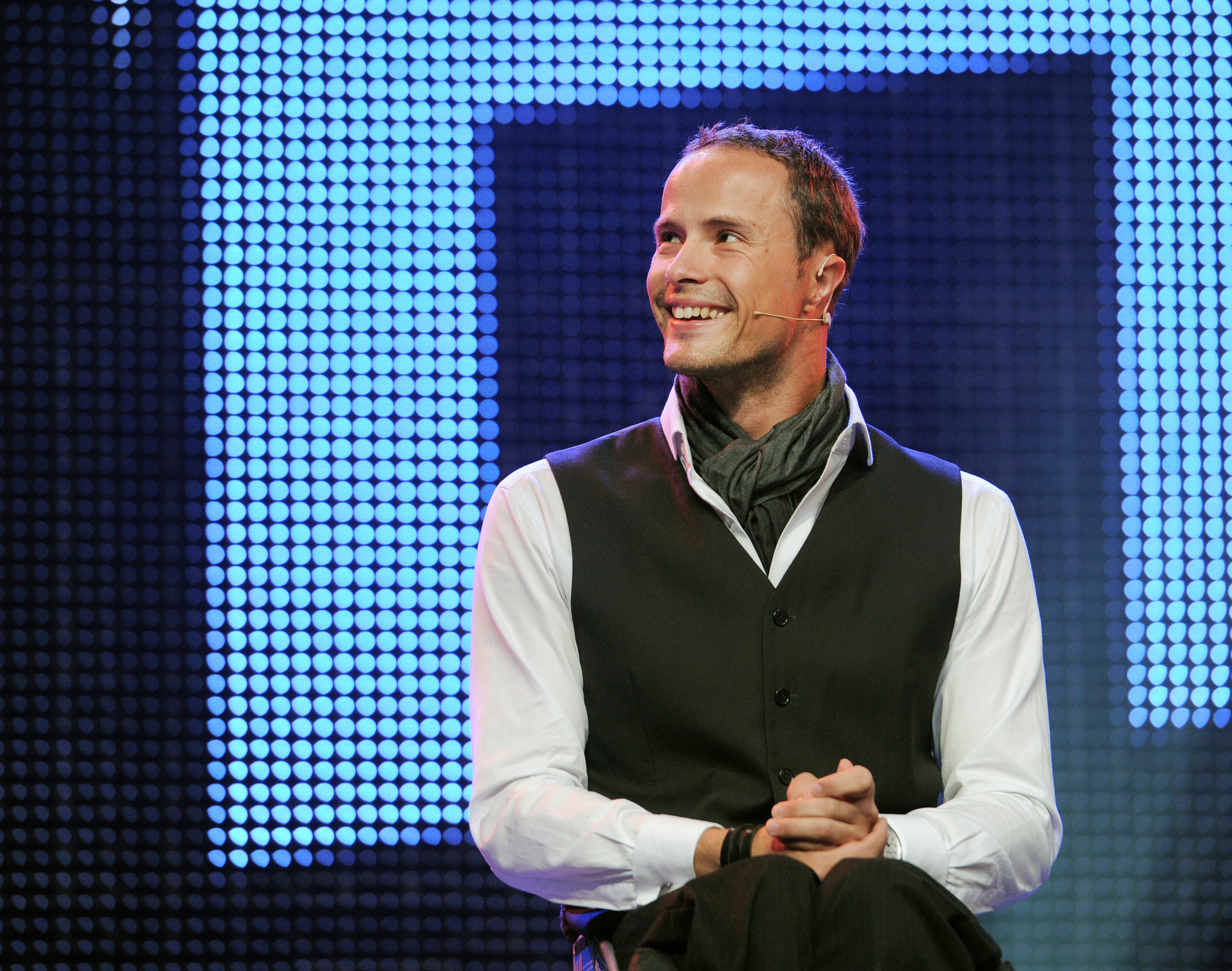
Winner Marcel Hug (pictured here in Davos in 2014)

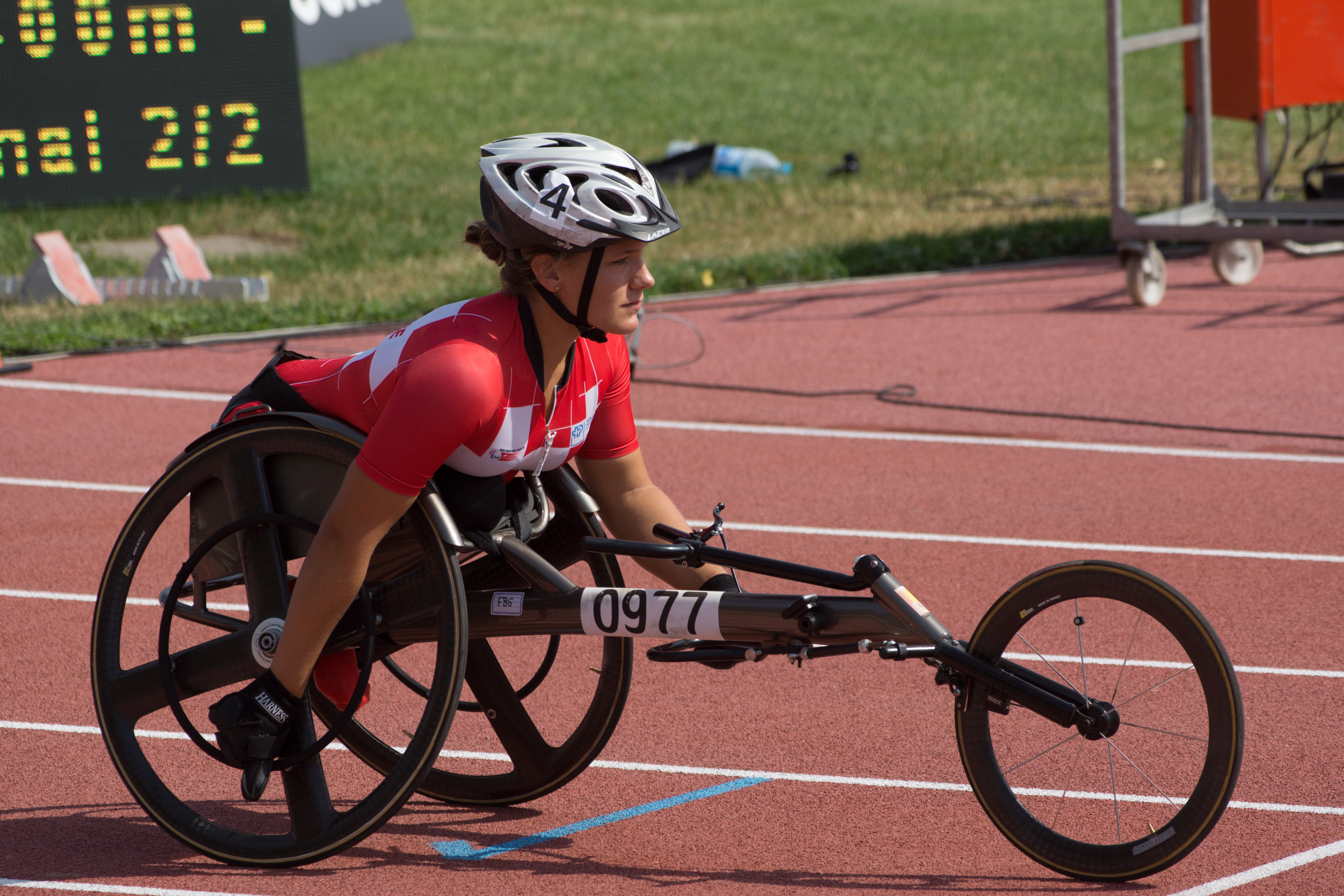
Winner Catherine Debrunner (pictured here in Lyon in 2013)

=== Wheelchair races ===
In the men's race, Marcel Hug, Daniel Romanchuk, and British athlete David Weir were racing together in the lead pack until around 9 km (5.6 mi) into the race, when Hug made his move and broke away from the others. Keeping a fast pace for the rest of the race, Hug won with a time of 1:24:56, nearly four minutes ahead of Romanchuk, who finished second with a time of 1:28:54. Weir came in third place with a time of 1:29:02. Hug's win was his seventh at the Berlin Marathon.

Amongst the women, there was no clear leader for most of the race, with defending champion Manuela Schär, U.S. athlete Susannah Scaroni, and debut marathoner Catherine Debrunner keeping pace with each other until the final sprint. Debrunner emerged victorious with a time of 1:36:47, breaking Schär's streak of five Berlin Marathon wins. (Note: The Berlin Marathon web site reports Schär's 2018 performance of 1:36:53, a world record at the time, to be the course record, even though Debrunner's time was six seconds faster.) Schär crossed the finish line three seconds later, and Scaroni completed the podium a second after Schär's finish.

== Results ==
Results for the top ten in the running races and top three in the wheelchair races are listed below.

Men's race result
Position	Athlete	Nationality	Time
1st place, gold medalist(s)	Eliud Kipchoge	Kenya	2:01:09 WR
2nd place, silver medalist(s)	Mark Korir	Kenya	2:05:58
3rd place, bronze medalist(s)	Tadu Abate	Ethiopia	2:06:28
4	Andamlak Belihu	Ethiopia	2:06:40
5	Abel Kipchumba	Kenya	2:06:49
6	Limenih Getachew	Ethiopia	2:07:07
7	Kenya Sonota	Japan	2:07:14
8	Tatsuya Maruyama	Japan	2:07:50
9	Kento Kikutani	Japan	2:07:56
10	Zablon Chumba	Kenya	2:08:01

Women's race result
Position	Athlete	Nationality	Time
1st place, gold medalist(s)	Tigist Assefa	Ethiopia	2:15:37 CR
2nd place, silver medalist(s)	Rosemary Wanjiru	Kenya	2:18:00
3rd place, bronze medalist(s)	Tigist Abayechew	Ethiopia	2:18:03
4	Workenesh Edesa	Ethiopia	2:18:51
5	Sisay Meseret Gola	Ethiopia	2:20:58
6	Keira D'Amato	United States	2:21:48
7	Rika Kaseda	Japan	2:21:55
8	Ayuko Suzuki	Japan	2:22:02
9	Sayaka Sato	Japan	2:22:13
10	Vibian Chepkirui	Kenya	2:22:21

Wheelchair men's race result
Position	Athlete	Nationality	Time
1st place, gold medalist(s)	Marcel Hug	Switzerland	1:24:56
2nd place, silver medalist(s)	Daniel Romanchuk	United States	1:28:54
3rd place, bronze medalist(s)	David Weir	United Kingdom	1:29:02

Wheelchair women's race result
Position	Athlete	Nationality	Time
1st place, gold medalist(s)	Catherine Debrunner	Switzerland	1:36:47
2nd place, silver medalist(s)	Manuela Schär	Switzerland	1:36:50
3rd place, bronze medalist(s)	Susannah Scaroni	United States	1:36:51
