= 2023 Berlin Marathon =

42.195 km (26.2 mi) race in Germany

49th Berlin Marathon
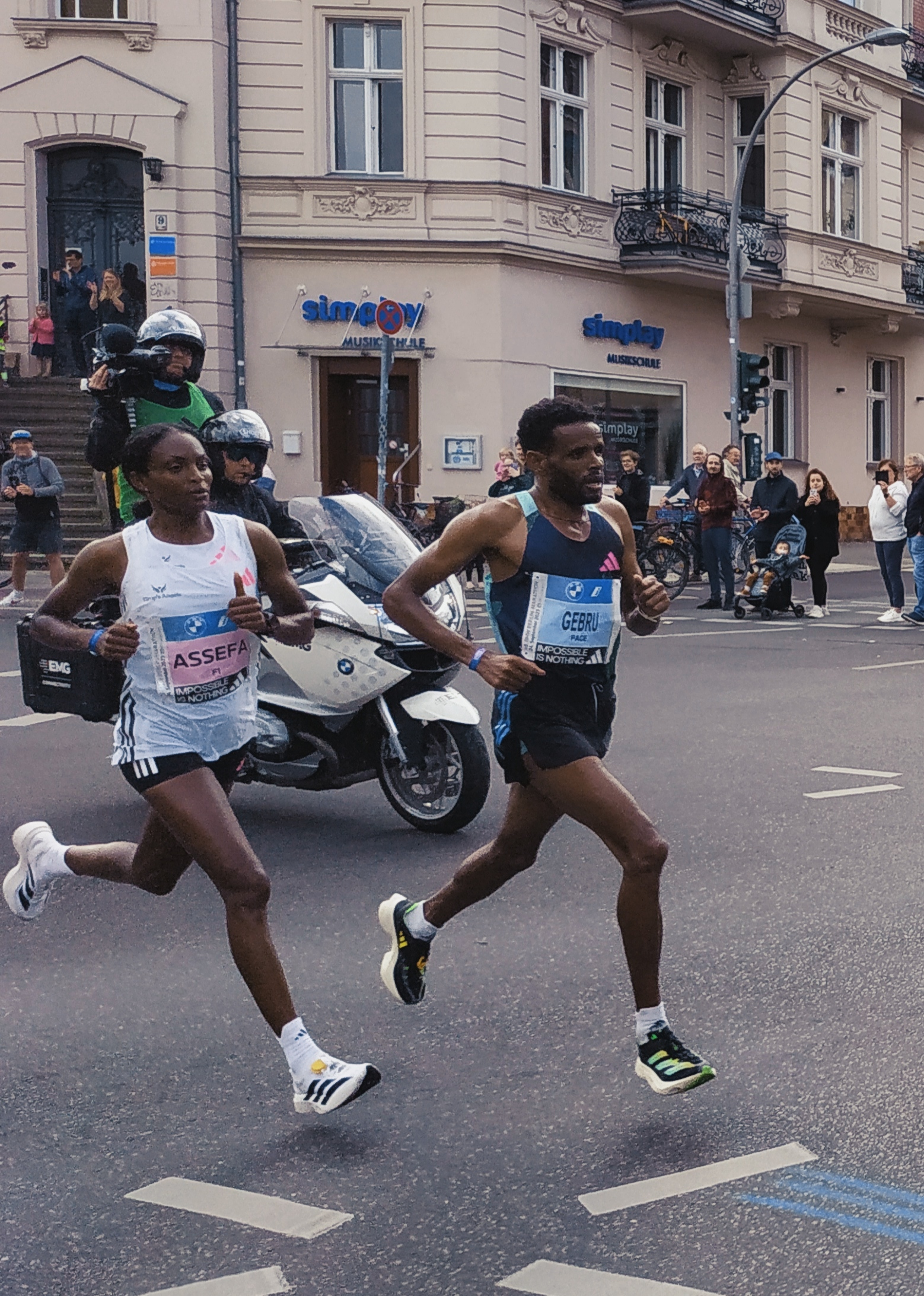
- Winner Tigst Assefa (left) about 25 km (16 mi) into the race, alongside pacemaker Girmay Birhanu Gebru
- Location: Berlin, Germany
- Dates: 24 September 2023 (2 years ago)
- Website: https://www.bmw-berlin-marathon.com

Champions
- Men: Eliud Kipchoge (2:02:42)
- Women: Tigst Assefa (2:11:53 WR)
- Wheelchair men: Marcel Hug (1:23:07)
- Wheelchair women: Catherine Debrunner (1:34:16 WR)

External media

Images
- Tigst Assefa crossing the finish line
- Tigst Assefa kneeling at the finish
- Tigst Assefa raising a shoe into the air
- Tigst Assefa with a lead car's clock

Video
- Tigst Assefa crossing the finish line
- Eliud Kipchoge crossing the finish line

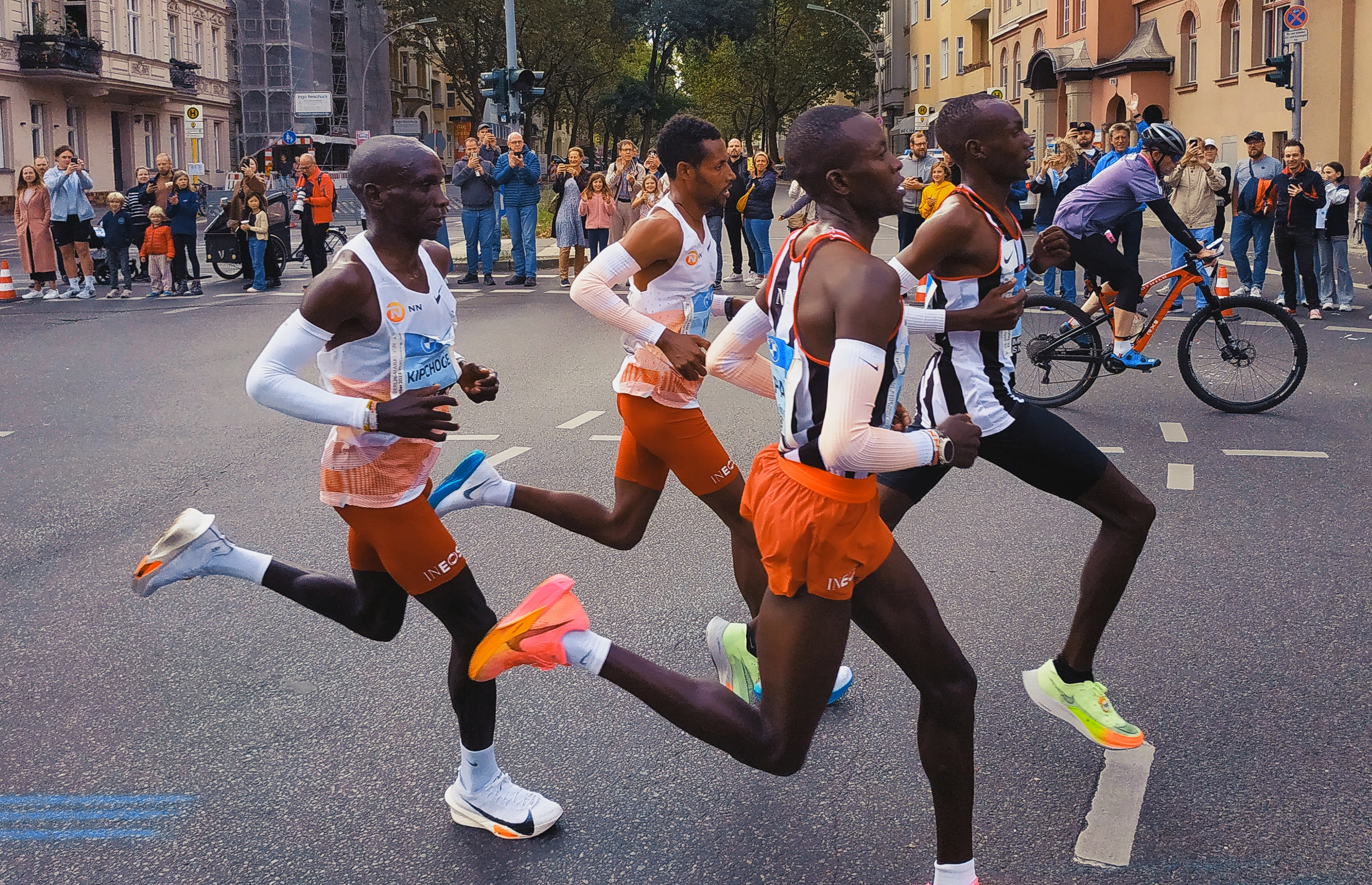
Winner Eliud Kipchoge (left) about 25 km (16 mi) into the race, behind pacemakers (in striped gear) and alongside Derseh Kindie (center midground), who did not finish the race

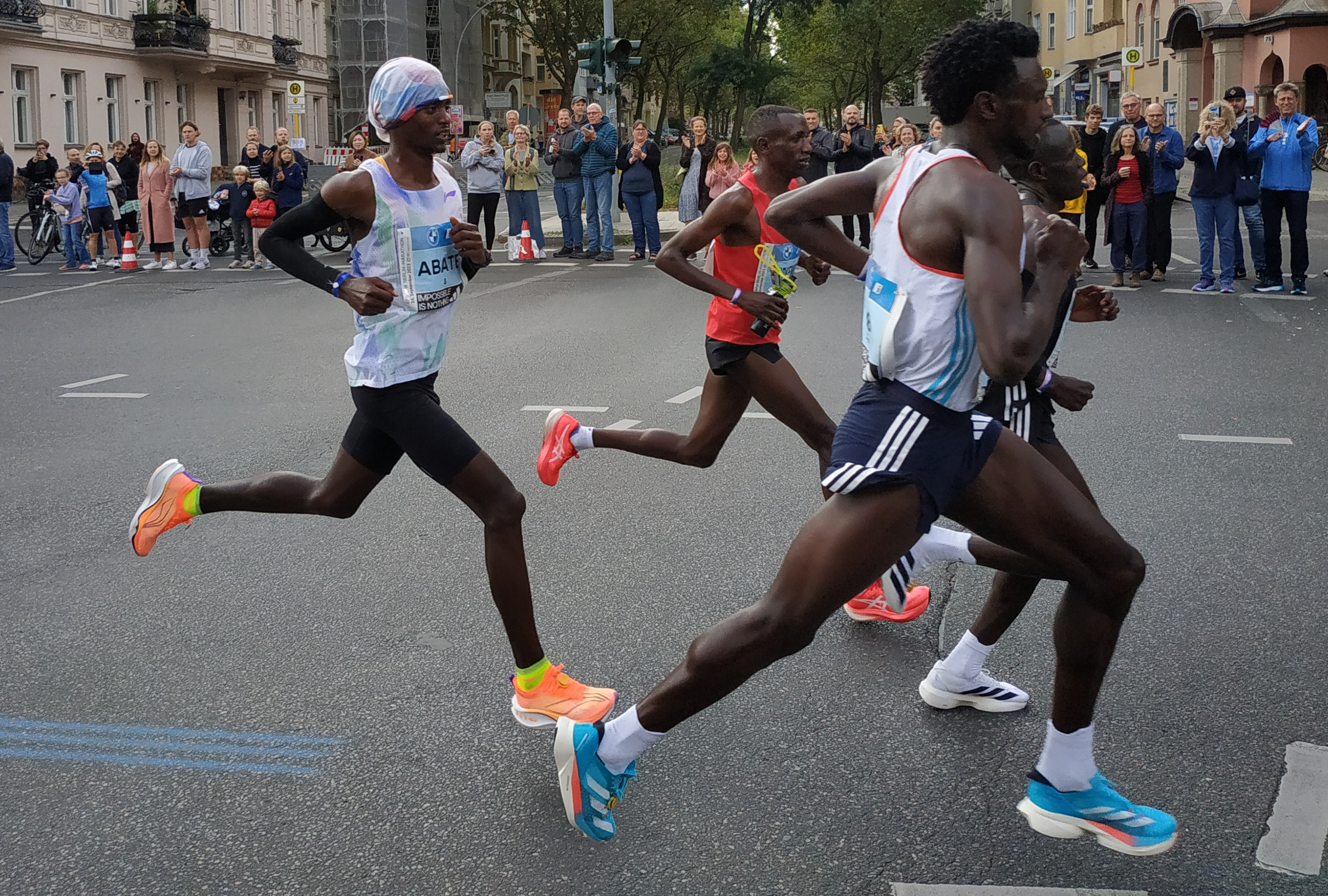
Second-place finisher Vincent Kipkemoi (center midground, in red) and third-place finisher Tadese Takele (right foreground), both about 25 km (16 mi) into their debut marathon, alongside eighth-place finisher Philemon Kiplimo (right midground, in black) and in front of fourteenth-place finisher Tadu Abate (left)

The 2023 Berlin Marathon was the 49th edition of the annual marathon race in Berlin, held on Sunday, 24 September 2023. A Platinum Label marathon, it was the fourth of six World Marathon Majors events scheduled for 2023. Almost 48,000 runners from 156 countries took part in the event.

Ethiopian runner Tigst Assefa set a new marathon world record for women, winning the race with a time of 2:11:53, beating the previous world record of 2:14:04, set by Kenyan runner Brigid Kosgei at the 2019 Chicago Marathon by over two minutes. Kenyan runner Eliud Kipchoge achieved a record fifth Berlin Marathon victory, winning the men's race with a time of 2:02:42.

Swiss wheelchair athletes Marcel Hug and Catherine Debrunner won their races with finish times of 1:23:07 and 1:34:16, respectively. This was Hug's eighth and Debrunner's second win.

Runner's World reported at the start of the year that race organizers planned to include a non-binary division for this year's race. The race site for 2023 mentions having separate ratings for both men and women. The 2023 event featured, for the first time in Berlin Marathon's history, a woman on the finisher medal.

== Competitors ==
Kipchoge was the holder of the marathon world record, which he had set with a finish time of 2:01:09 at this race the previous year. He is the first runner to have won the Berlin Marathon five times. Kipchoge stated that his main goal is to win three consecutive Olympic gold medals, and that he believed running in Berlin was the best way to prepare for this.

Assefa won the race last year with a time of 2:15:37, breaking the previous course record by more than two minutes in what was only her second marathon ever.

This record fast race scored record times for other runners: a record eight women achieved times below 2:20, and a record nine men below 2:05 and 15 finished inside 2:06. Additionally there were national records for Amanal Petros (Germany, 2:04:58) and Tadesse Abraham (Switzerland, 2:05:10).

In the wheelchair race, Catherine Debrunner (Switzerland) broke the world record in 1:34:16 hours.

== Results ==
Results for the top ten in the running races and top three in the wheelchair races are listed below.

Men's race result
| Position | Athlete | Nationality | Time |
|---|---|---|---|
| 1st place, gold medalist(s) | Eliud Kipchoge | Kenya | 2:02:42 |
| 2nd place, silver medalist(s) | Vincent Kipkemoi | Kenya | 2:03:13 |
| 3rd place, bronze medalist(s) | Tadese Takele | Ethiopia | 2:03:24 |
| 4 | Ronald Korir | Kenya | 2:04:22 |
| 5 | Haftu Teklu | Ethiopia | 2:04:42 |
| 6 | Andualem Belay Shiferaw | Ethiopia | 2:04:44 |
| 7 | Amos Kipruto | Kenya | 2:04:49 |
| 8 | Philemon Kiplimo | Kenya | 2:04:56 |
| 9 | Amanal Petros | Germany | 2:04:58 |
| 10 | Bonface Kimutai Kiplimo | Kenya | 2:05:05 |

Women's race result
| Position | Athlete | Nationality | Time |
|---|---|---|---|
| 1st place, gold medalist(s) | Tigst Assefa | Ethiopia | 2:11:53 WR |
| 2nd place, silver medalist(s) | Sheila Chepkirui | Kenya | 2:17:49 |
| 3rd place, bronze medalist(s) | Magdalena Shauri | Tanzania | 2:18:41 |
| 4 | Zeineba Yimer | Ethiopia | 2:19:07 |
| 5 | Senbere Teferi | Ethiopia | 2:19:21 |
| 6 | Dera Dida | Ethiopia | 2:19:24 |
| 7 | Workenesh Edesa | Ethiopia | 2:19:40 |
| 8 | Helen Bekele | Ethiopia | 2:19:44 |
| 9 | Charlotte Purdue | United Kingdom | 2:22:17 |
| 10 | Fikrte Wereta | Ethiopia | 2:23:01 |

Wheelchair men's race result
| Position | Athlete | Nationality | Time |
|---|---|---|---|
| 1st place, gold medalist(s) | Marcel Hug | Switzerland | 1:23:07 |
| 2nd place, silver medalist(s) | Daniel Romanchuk | United States | 1:30:16 |
| 3rd place, bronze medalist(s) | David Weir | United Kingdom | 1:30:17 |

Wheelchair women's race result
| Position | Athlete | Nationality | Time |
|---|---|---|---|
| 1st place, gold medalist(s) | Catherine Debrunner | Switzerland | 1:34:16 WR |
| 2nd place, silver medalist(s) | Eden Rainbow-Cooper | United Kingdom | 1:34:17 |
| 3rd place, bronze medalist(s) | Manuela Schär | Switzerland | 1:34:17 |
