= 2021 Boston Marathon =

Footrace in Boston, Massachusetts, USA

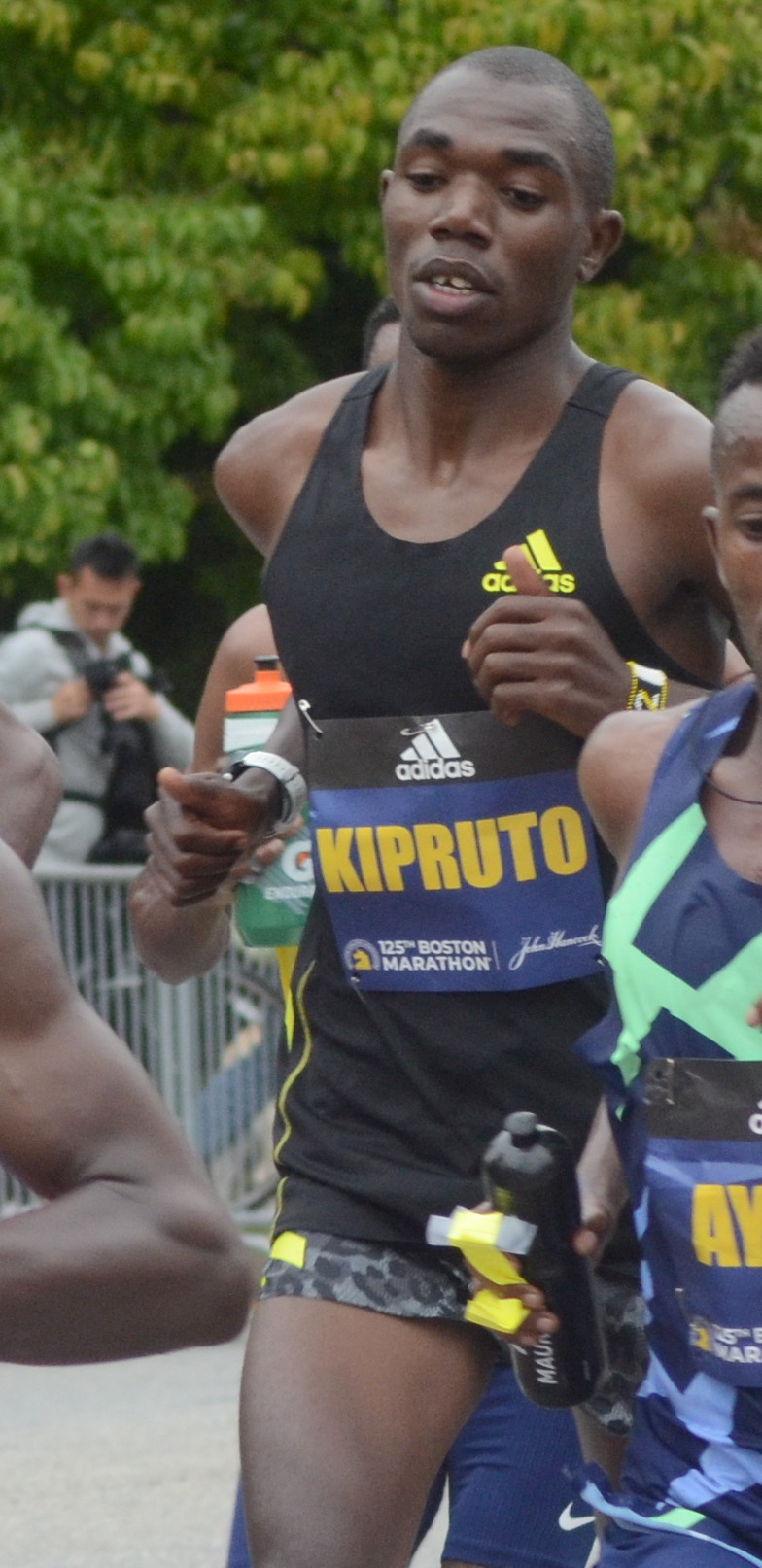
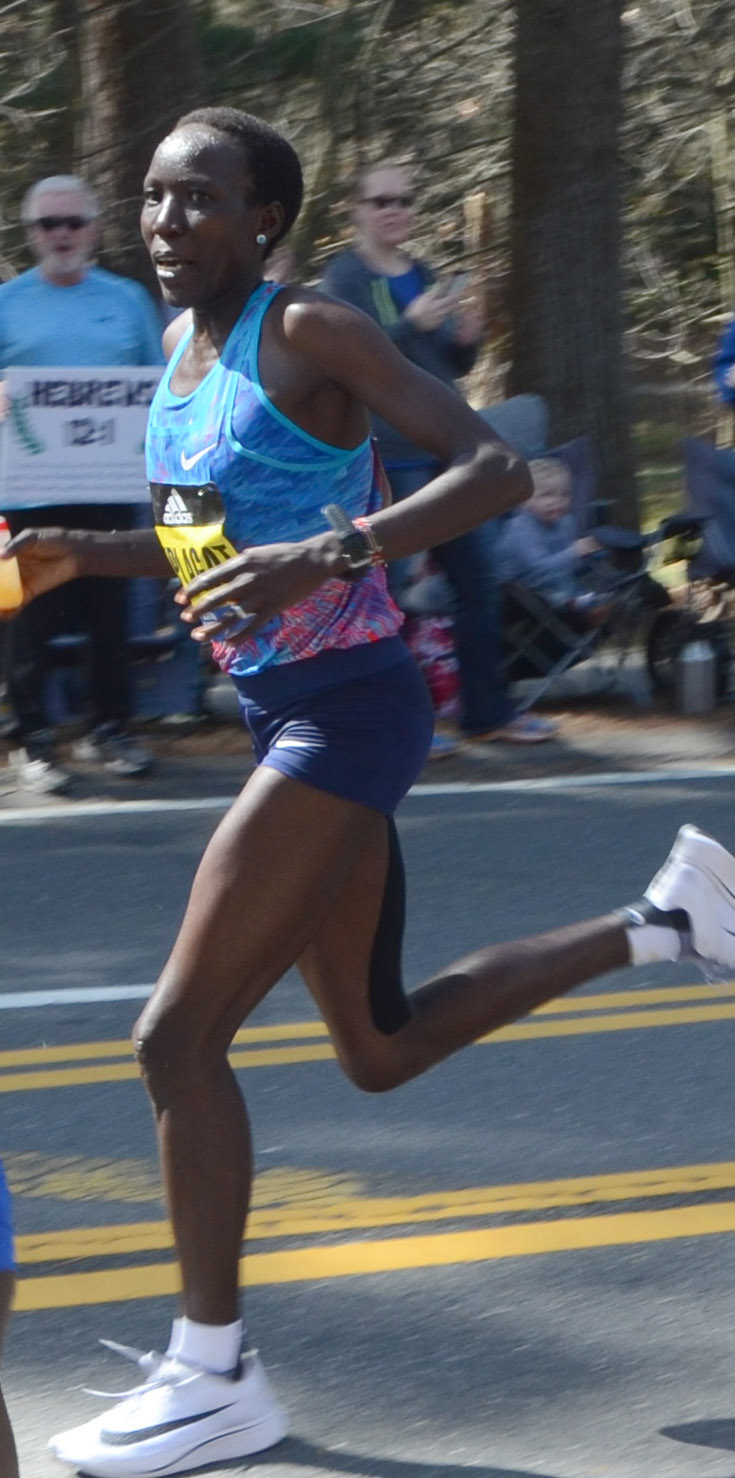
- Benson Kipruto and Edna Kiplagat
- Venue: Boston, Massachusetts, United States
- Date: October 11, 2021

Champions
- Men: Benson Kipruto (2:09:51)
- Women: Edna Kiplagat (2:25:09)
- Wheelchair men: Marcel Hug (1:18:11)
- Wheelchair women: Manuela Schär (1:35:21)

The 2021 Boston Marathon was the 125th official running (Note: Although no on-course race was held in 2020, organizers staged a virtual event as the 124th edition of the marathon.) of the annual marathon race held in Boston, Massachusetts, and 123rd time it was run on course (excluding the virtual event of 2020, and the ekiden of 1918). It took place on October 11, 2021.

The elite men's marathon was won by Benson Kipruto in 2:09:51. The men's wheelchair race was won by Marcel Hug and the women's wheelchair race by Manuela Schär, both of Switzerland, in 1:18:11 and 1:35:21, respectively. The elite women's marathon was won by Kenyan Edna Kiplagat with a time of 2:25:09, in a result made official on December 20, 2022, by the Boston Athletic Association, following a statement posted by the Athletics Integrity Unit.

== COVID-19 impact and protocols ==
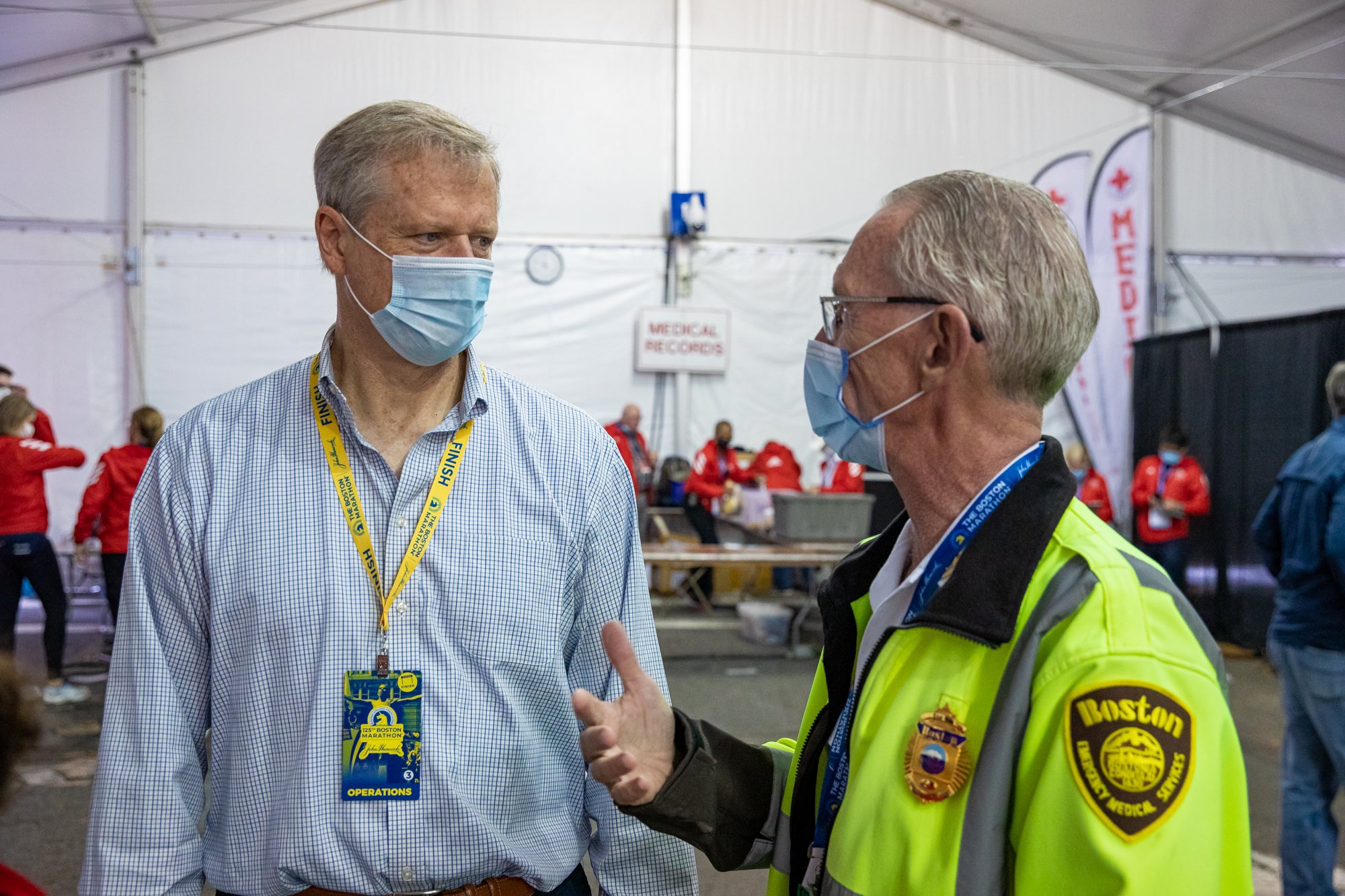
Massachusetts Governor Charlie Baker (left) meeting with marathon medical workers and volunteers

After the planned 2020 edition of the race was canceled, due to the COVID-19 pandemic, organizers moved the 2021 race from its traditional Patriots' Day date in April to Columbus Day federal holiday in October (which is a federal holiday, unlike Patriots' Day, a local only holiday). It was the first time that the Boston Marathon was run in the fall. The Boston event was one day after the 2021 Chicago Marathon, and multiple wheelchair racers chose to compete in both events.

Organizers also limited the field to 20,000 runners. Race entrants were required to provide proof of COVID vaccination or take an on-site COVID test yielding a negative result before the race. Participants were issued a bracelet to be worn through completion of the race, as proof of compliance. Runners were required to comply with local face masks requirements, and while using race transportation, but masks were not required during the marathon.

== Course ==
The marathon distance is officially 42.195 kilometres (26.219 mi), as sanctioned by World Athletics. The start is in the town of Hopkinton, and the first 6 miles (9.7 km) are downhill through Ashland and into the city of Framingham. Leaving Framingham, the runners enter the town of Natick, before passing through the "Scream Tunnel" at mile 12. This area is lined by young women from the nearby Wellesley College who request kisses from runners, a tradition that has been in place for more than 100 years. At mile 15, there is a large downhill section, followed by a 0.75-mile (1.21 km) climb at mile 16 crossing the Yankee Division Highway. The runners take a right turn onto Commonwealth Avenue in Newton before starting the first of the four Newton Hills.

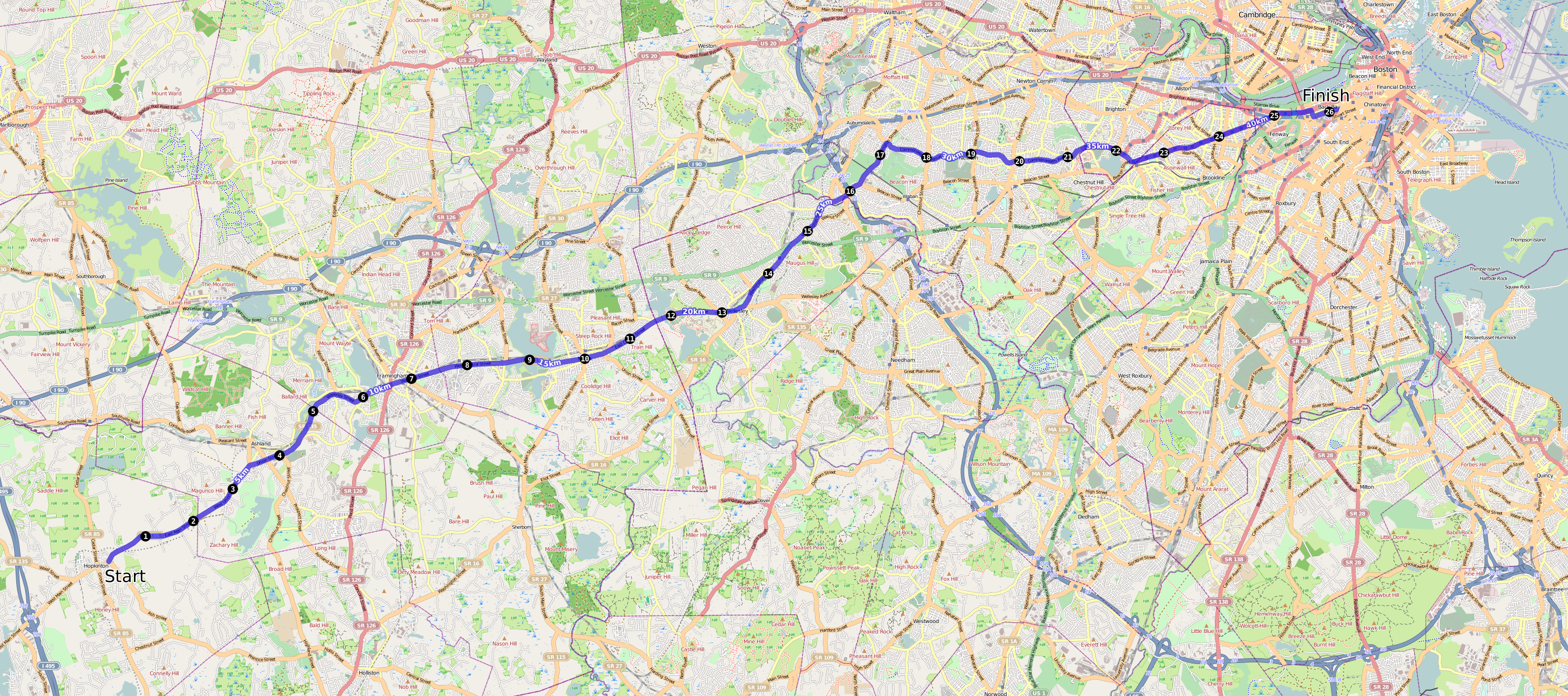
Course map

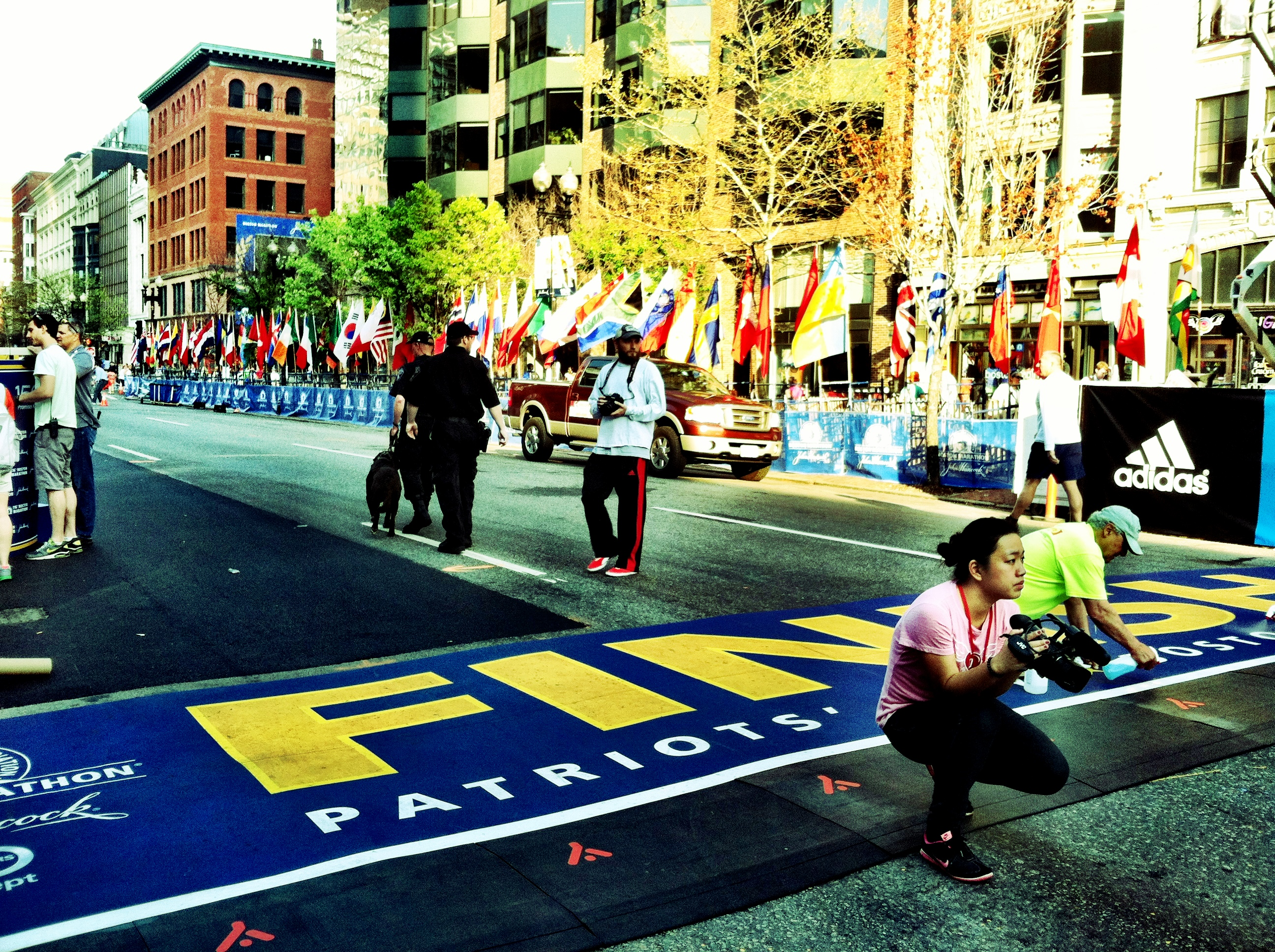
Finish line on Boylston Street in 2012

The first hill is a steep 1,200-yard (1,100 m) climb, the second about 0.25 miles (0.40 km), the third a steep 800 yards (730 m) before the runners start the infamous "Heartbreak Hill" at just after mile 20. At half a mile long and with a 3.3% percent incline, it is not especially difficult, but due to the hill being 20 miles (32 km) into the race, it is still feared as the runners' legs are usually tired at this point. The course is mostly downhill to the end, and passes through Boston College before entering Cleveland Circle and Kenmore Square, where there are many spectators. The final mile has a slight incline, before it flattens off to finish on Boylston Street.

== Race summary ==
For the first time in Boston Marathon history, the elite men's race was started separately from the mass participation event. The event was won by Kenyan Benson Kipruto. CJ Albertson led the race in the early stages, before fading away; at the halfway point of the race, Albertson was over two minutes ahead of everyone else. Kipruto pulled away from the leading pack with 3 miles (4.8 km) to go in the race, on Beacon Street, and won by 49 seconds. Ethiopians Lemi Berhanu and Jemal Yimer finished second and third respectively. Colin Bennie was the top finishing American, in seventh place, and Albertson finished tenth overall.

The elite women's race was won by Kenyan Edna Kiplagat; it was the eighth time since 2000 that Kenyans had won both elite events. Fellow Kenyans Mary Ngugi and Monicah Ngige finished second and third respectively. At the halfway point, there were 14 runners in the lead group, and eight of those ran negative splits. Nell Rojas was the best finishing American; she was fifth overall. 2018 winner Desiree Linden was ill during the race. Shalane Flanagan finished in a time of 2:40:34 as part of an attempt to finish the five active World Marathon Majors in 2021 in 42 days. The previous day in Chicago, she had finished in 2:46:39, and she had previously finished in 2:38:32 at Berlin and 2:35:04 at London.

The men's wheelchair race was won by Swiss athlete Marcel Hug. He was on a course record time, which would have earned him $50,000, until he took a wrong turn. Hug finished in a time of 01:18:11, seven seconds slower than the course record, which he had set in 2017. American Daniel Romanchuk finished second, seven minutes and 35 seconds behind Hug, and Ernst van Dyk was third overall.

The women's wheelchair race was won by Manuela Schär. Schär won the event by almost 15 minutes, and it was her third Boston Marathon victory. Schär took the lead early on, and by half distance, she was five minutes ahead of Tatyana McFadden, her nearest competitor. McFadden finished second overall.

=== Diana Kipyokei doping ===
On November 4, 2021, the University of California, Los Angeles Olympic Analytical Laboratory, an official World Anti-Doping Agency laboratory, found Diana Kipyokei of Kenya, who finished first in the women's division with a time of 2:24:45, tested positive for triamcinolone acetonide from her samples taken at the Boston Marathon. Her representative sent a statement to the Athletics Integrity Unit stating she had been injected with the prohibited substance by David Njenga of Roybey Chemists on August 3, 2021, at the Uasin Gishu County Hospital in Eldoret, to treat a tendonitis injury from the Prague Marathon after three visits to the hospital on June 5 and July 14, 2021.

On December 7, 2021, the Athletics Integrity Unit announced after her representative's statement that she was under formal investigation for doping charges after a positive test. On February 8, 2022, she was interrogated by the organisation, where she admitted two injections of the prohibited substance by Dr. Njenga occurred in September 2021. The Anti-Doping Association of Kenya was then interviewed, where a statement was released April 14, 2022. The anti-doping agency statement noted she did not visit the Eldoret hospital in the three dates referenced in the report, and the injection was not at the hospital, nor were official documents. The agency noted the documents were falsified.

On June 27, 2022, Kipyokei admitted she asked Dr. Njenga to prepare the falsified medical documents to the Athletics Integrity Unit, paying the doctor 20,000 Kenyan shillings, and the information from the medical documents from the Eldoret hospital were false.

On October 14, 2022, she was charged with a positive test and tampering with doping control. On December 19, 2022, the six-year suspension went into effect, including formally being disqualified from the 2021 Boston Marathon by the Athletics Integrity Unit. The next day, Boston Athletic Association formally stripped her of the win, with rankings and prize money adjusted.

== Results ==
=== Men ===
Elite men's top 10 finishers
Place	Athlete	Nationality	Time
1st place, gold medalist(s)	Benson Kipruto	Kenya	2:09:51
2nd place, silver medalist(s)	Lemi Berhanu	Ethiopia	2:10:37
3rd place, bronze medalist(s)	Jemal Yimer	Ethiopia	2:10:38
4	Tsedat Ayana	Ethiopia	2:10:47
5	Leonard Barsoton	Kenya	2:11:11
6	Bayelign Teshager	Ethiopia	2:11:16
7	Colin Bennie	United States	2:11:26
8	Dejene Debela	Ethiopia	2:11:38
9	Wilson Chebet	Kenya	2:11:40
10	CJ Albertson	United States	2:11:44

=== Women ===
Elite women's top 10 finishers
Place	Athlete	Nationality	Time
1st place, gold medalist(s)	Edna Kiplagat	Kenya	2:25:09
2nd place, silver medalist(s)	Mary Ngugi	Kenya	2:25:20
3rd place, bronze medalist(s)	Monicah Ngige	Kenya	2:25:32
4	Netsanet Gudeta	Ethiopia	2:26:09
5	Nell Rojas	United States	2:27:12
6	Workenesh Edesa	Ethiopia	2:27:38
7	Atsede Baysa	Ethiopia	2:28:04
8	Biruktayit Eshetu	Ethiopia	2:29:05
9	Tigist Abayechew	Kenya	2:29:06
10	Caroline Rotich	Kenya	2:29:54

Note: Women's table adjusted following the October 14, 2022, revision of results due to the disqualification of Diana Kipyokei.

=== Wheelchair men ===
Wheelchair men's top 10 finishers
Place	Athlete	Nationality	Time
1st place, gold medalist(s)	Marcel Hug	Switzerland	1:18:11
2nd place, silver medalist(s)	Daniel Romanchuk	United States	1:25:46
3rd place, bronze medalist(s)	Ernst van Dyk	South Africa	1:28:43
4	Aaron Pike	United States	1:28:55
5	Josh Cassidy	Canada	1:28:56
6	Johnboy Smith	United Kingdom	1:31:43
7	Kota Hokinoue	Japan	1:34:16
8	Hermin Garic	United States	1:34:23
9	Sho Watanabe	Japan	1:35:06
10	Hiroki Nishida	Japan	1:35:11

=== Wheelchair women ===
Wheelchair women's top 10 finishers
Place	Athlete	Nationality	Time
1st place, gold medalist(s)	Manuela Schär	Switzerland	1:35:21
2nd place, silver medalist(s)	Tatyana McFadden	United States	1:50:20
3rd place, bronze medalist(s)	Yen Hoang	United States	1:51:24
4	Vanessa De Souza	Brazil	1:53:23
5	Shelly Woods	United Kingdom	1:54:33
6	Jenna Fesemyer	United States	1:59:51
7	Margriet van den Broek	Netherlands	2:04:28
8	Michelle Wheeler	United States	2:07:10
9	Arielle Rausin	United States	2:07:32
10	Eva Houston	United States	2:41:52
