= Athletics at the 1989 Summer Universiade – Men's marathon =

The men's marathon event at the 1989 Summer Universiade was held in Duisburg on 26 August 1989.

== Results ==
Rank	Athlete	Nationality	Time	Notes
1st place, gold medalist(s)	Tibor Baier	Hungary	2:14:33	GR
2nd place, silver medalist(s)	Ruslam Shagiyev	Soviet Union	2:14:59	
3rd place, bronze medalist(s)	Kennedy Manyisa	Kenya	2:15:23	
4	Fumiako Makino	Japan	2:16:21	
5	Karel David	Czechoslovakia	2:16:31	
6	Viktor Gural	Soviet Union	2:17:11	
7	Shu Gishen	Chinese Taipei	2:17:28	
8	Daniel Gonzales	United States	2:17:56	
9	Hiroki Takeda	Japan	2:18:15	
10	Mukhamet Nazipov	Soviet Union	2:19:40	
11	José María Fernández	Spain	2:20:40	
12	Volker Krajenski	West Germany	2:21:44	
13	Yu Jin-hong	South Korea	2:24:08	
14	Leonardo Croce	Italy	2:24:33	
15	Fausto Molinari	Italy	2:25:19	
16	Ronnie Borsheim	United States	2:25:19	
17	Gianluigi Macina	San Marino	2:27:03	
	Kipkorir Bett	Kenya	DNF	
	Daniel Njoroge	Kenya	DNF	
	Kim Won-tak	South Korea	DNF	
	Kwame Tefe	Ghana	DNF	
	Michael Scannell	United States	DNF	
	Riza Erdal	Turkey	DNF	
