= Athletics at the 2007 All-Africa Games – Men's 10,000 metres =

The men's 10,000 metres at the 2007 All-Africa Games were held on July 19.

== Results ==
Rank	Name	Nationality	Time	Notes
1st place, gold medalist(s)	Zersenay Tadese	Eritrea	27:00.30	GR
2nd place, silver medalist(s)	Tadesse Tola	Ethiopia	27:28.08	
3rd place, bronze medalist(s)	Gebregziabher Gebremariam	Ethiopia	27:41.24	
4	Dickson Marwa	Tanzania	27:59.91	
5	Edward Muge	Kenya	28:04.86	
6	Boniface Kiprop	Uganda	28:05.66	
7	Habtamu Fekadu	Ethiopia	28:06.00	
8	Samuel Tzegay	Eritrea	28:21.68	
9	Abraham Nyonkuru	Burundi	28:38.58	
10	Coolboy Ngamole	South Africa	28:43.01	
11	Tesfayohannes Mesfin	Eritrea	28:53.94	
12	Samwel Kwaang'w	Tanzania	29:00.96	
13	Henry Sugut	Kenya	29:12.57	
14	Joseph Birech	Kenya	29:22.85	
15	Morsamai Motone	South Africa	29:49.22	
16	Brahim Chettah	Algeria	29:49.97	
17	Gervais Hakizimana	Rwanda	30:18.49	
18	Joaquin Chaman	Angola	30:35.02	
19	Themaa Miya	South Africa	30:45.15	
20	Albert Sechaba Bohosi	Lesotho	31:02.83	
21	Molahleh Bokaako	Lesotho	31:02.85	
