= Vienna City Marathon =

Annual race in Austria held since 1984

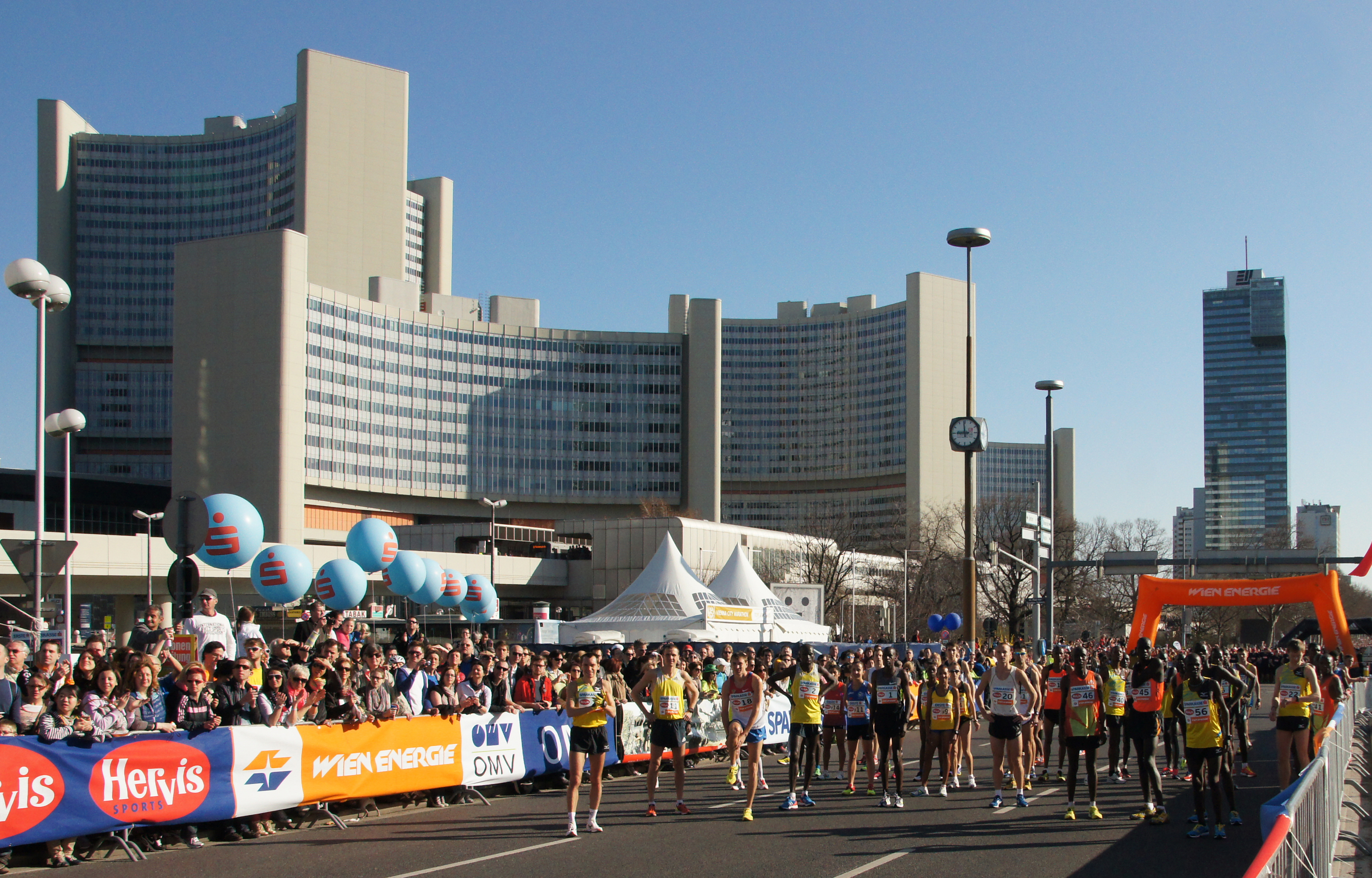
- Elite runners approaching the start line in front of the Vienna International Centre in 2013
- Date: 21 April 2024
- Location: Vienna, Austria
- Event type: Road
- Distance: Marathon, Half marathon, 10K run
- Primary sponsor: Erste Group, Hervis, Wien Energie
- Established: 1984 (42 years ago)
- Organizer: Enterprise Sport Promotion GmbH
- Course records: Men's: 2:05:08 (2023) (Kenya) Samwel Mailu; Women's: 2:20:06 (2026) (Ethiopia) Tigist Gezahagn
- Website: Vienna City Marathon
- Participants: 4,801 finishers (2022); 3,056 finishers (2021); 5,739 finishers (2019)

The Vienna City Marathon is an annual marathon race over the classic distance of 42.195 km held in Vienna, Austria since 1984.

== History ==
The first edition was held on 25 March 1984 with a total of 794 competitors. It is Austria's largest road running event and the 2010 edition had record participation with 32,940 runners from 108 nations taking part in the day's races. The race has been organised by Wolfgang Konrad since 1989.

The race day's events also include a marathon team relay event, a 4.2 km fun run and a half marathon. In 2011, Haile Gebrselassie ran the fastest ever time on Austrian soil for the half marathon distance. The 2012 edition saw Haile and Paula Radcliffe engage in a novel half marathon race, with Radcliffe receiving a head start 7:52 minutes (the difference between the two athletes personal bests). Gebrselassie crossed the finish line 3 minutes and 19 seconds ahead of Radcliffe.

Due to the coronavirus pandemic, the 2020 edition of the race was cancelled and the 2021 edition was postponed to 12 September 2021.

== Course ==
External image
- Course map of full marathon in 2019

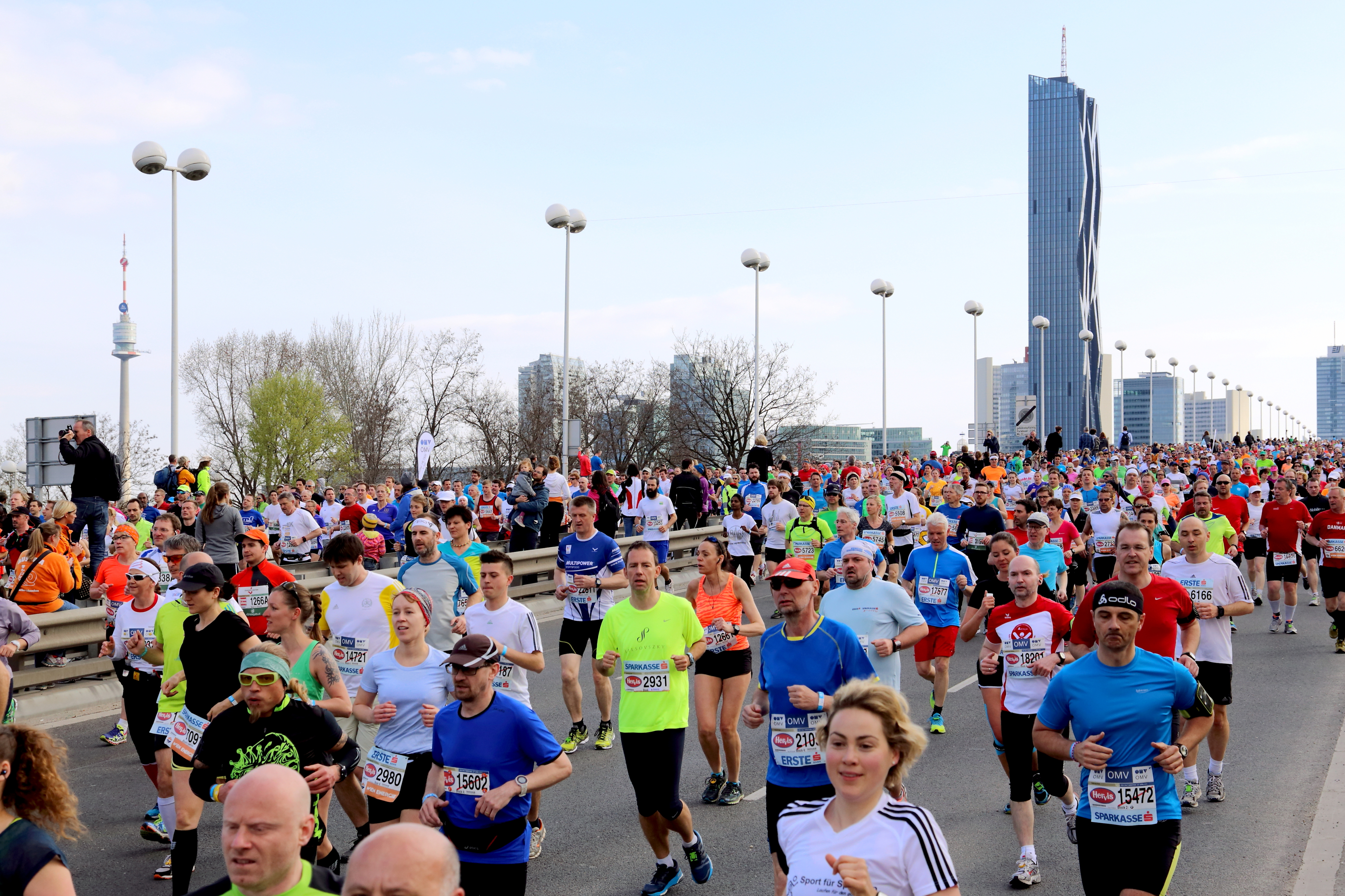
Crossing the Reichsbrücke with Donau City in the background, 2015

The route starts at the Vienna International Centre, traverses the Reichsbrücke and the traffic junction Praterstern on the left side of the Donaukanal, then runs alongside the Ringstraße until reaching the Vienna State Opera. After crossing the left bank of the Wien river on Wienzeile to the Schönbrunn Palace, the route goes back to the Heldenplatz (via the Mariahilferstraße) where the half-marathon finishes. The full-marathon runners, however, continue past the Rathaus through Alsergrund to the Friedensbrücke. The track continues on the left side of the Donaukanal and the Praterstern, thus returning to the Prater, where it leads past the Ernst-Happel-Stadion and the Lusthaus, crosses over the Franzensbrücke, finally following the Ringstraße to the finish at the Heldenplatz.

== Winners ==
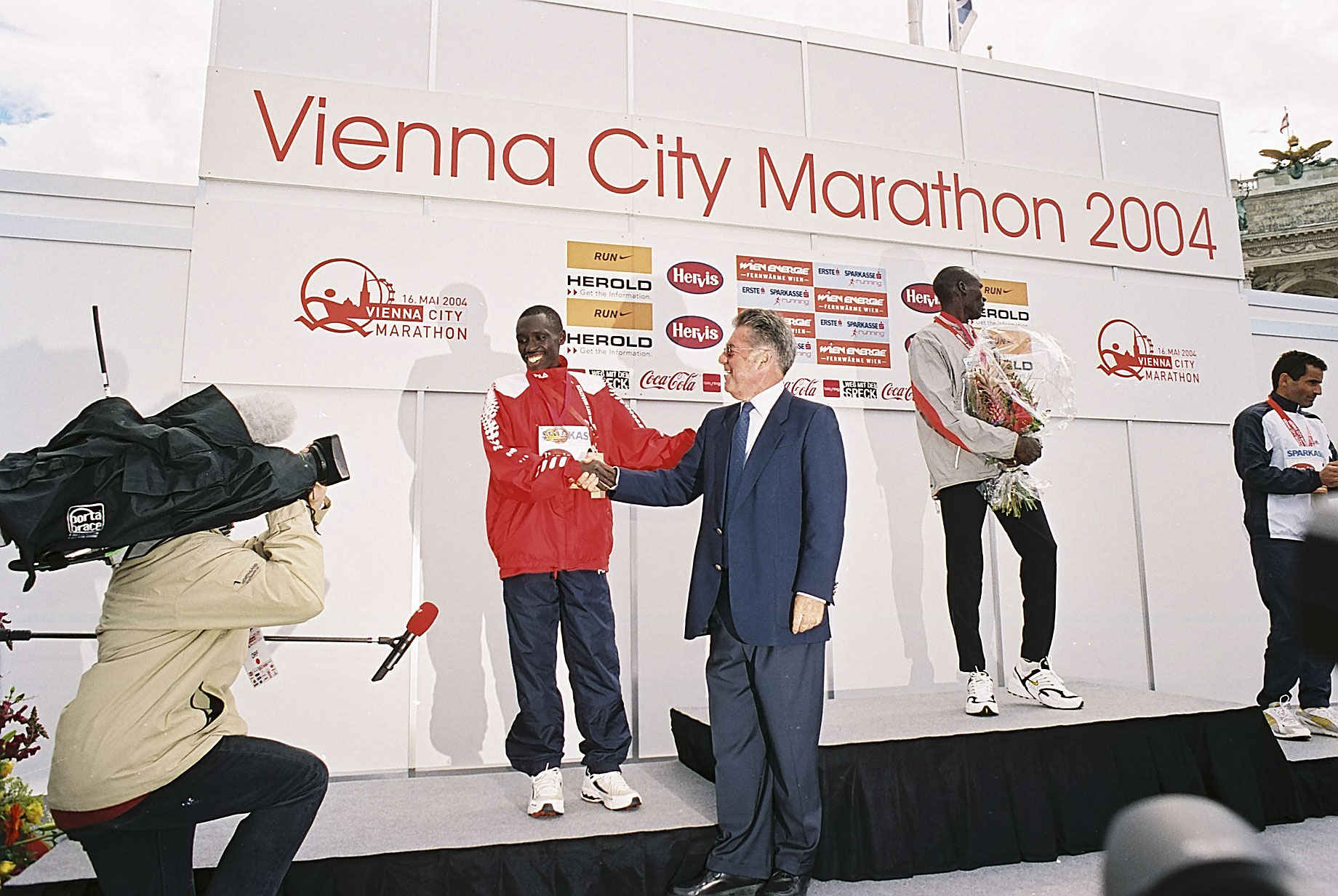
President Heinz Fischer at 2004 awards ceremony

Key:

Course record
Austrian championship race

=== Marathon ===
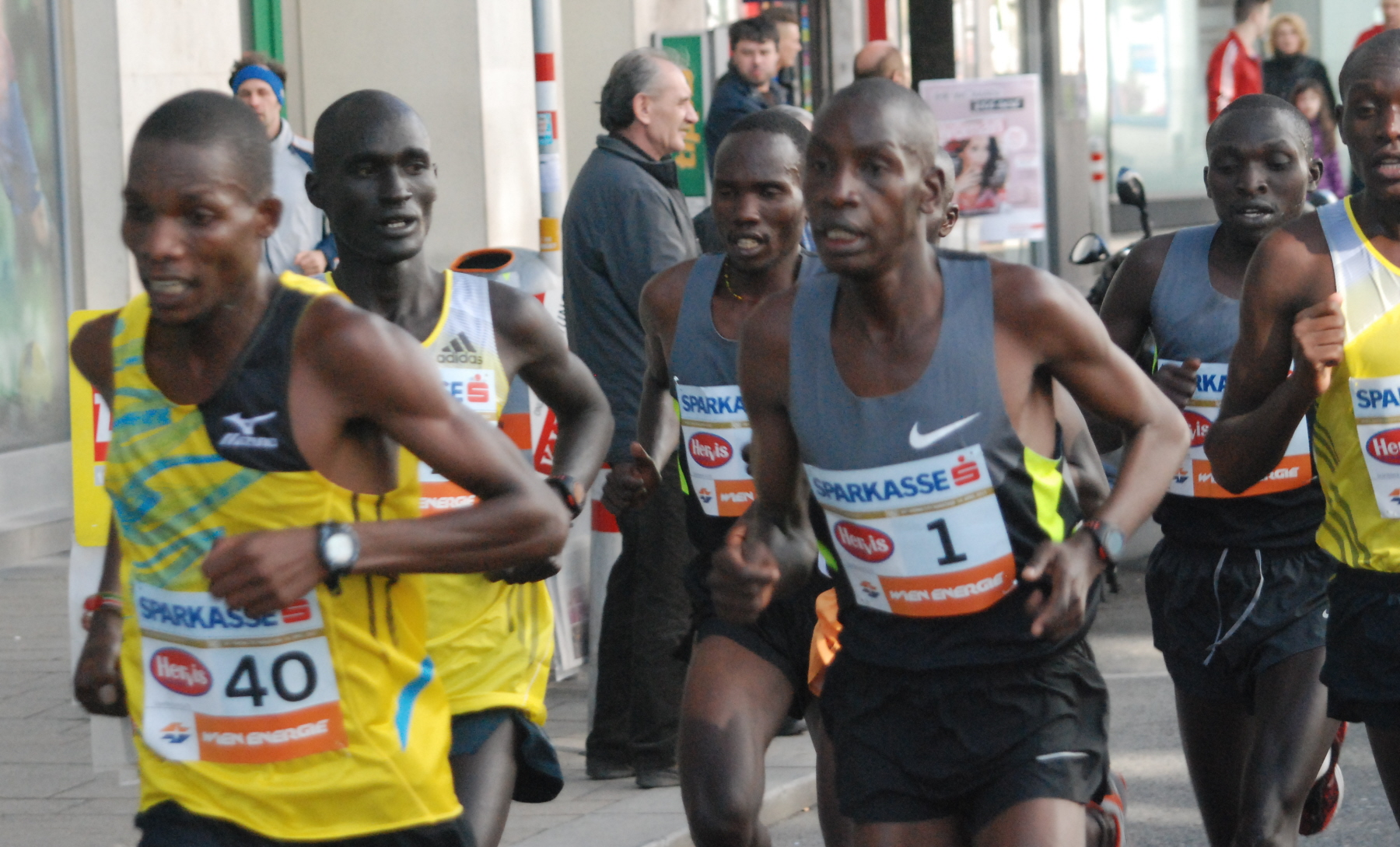
Henry Sugut (Nr. 1) 'en route' in 2013

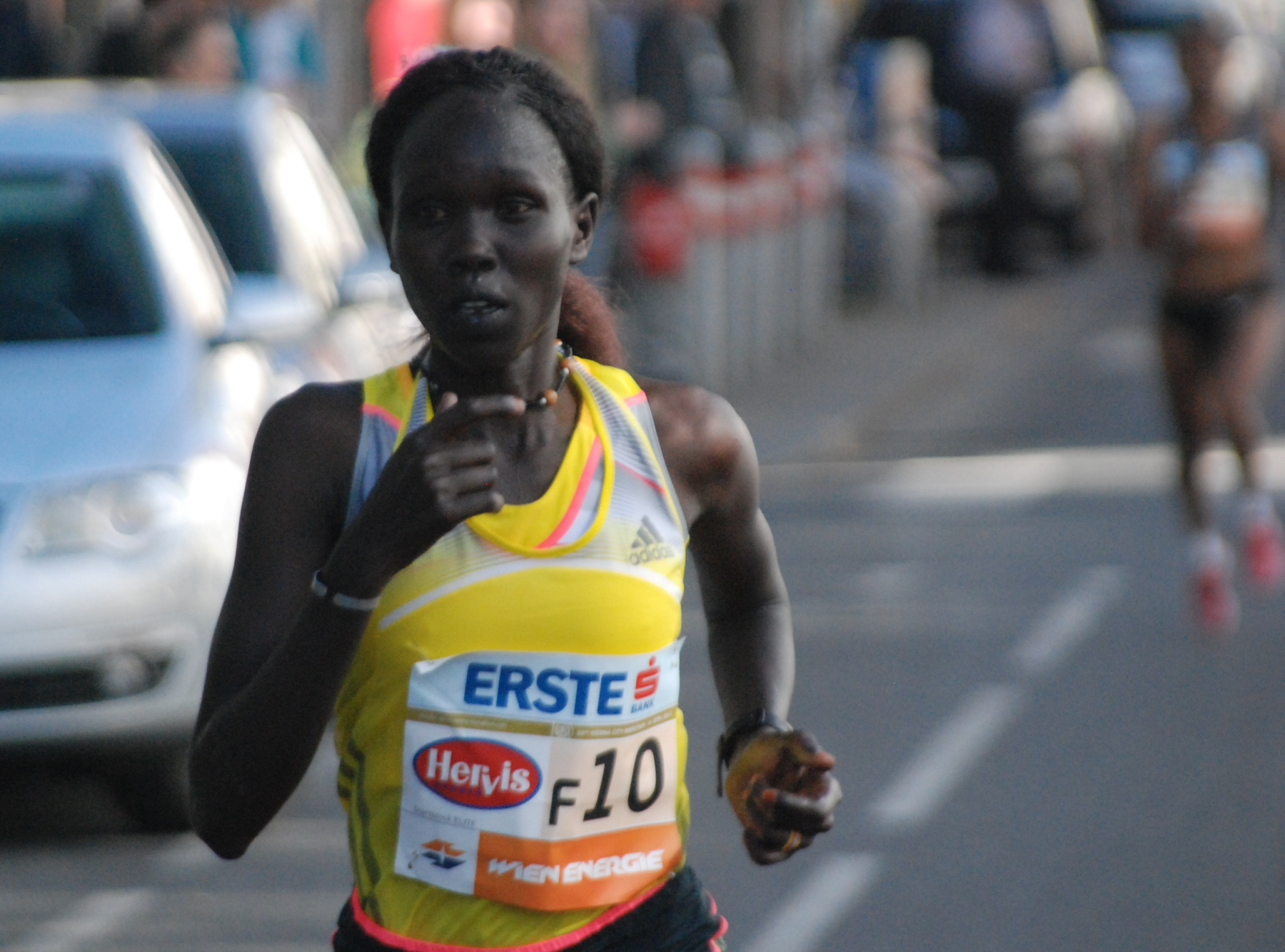
Flomena Cheyech (F10), 2013

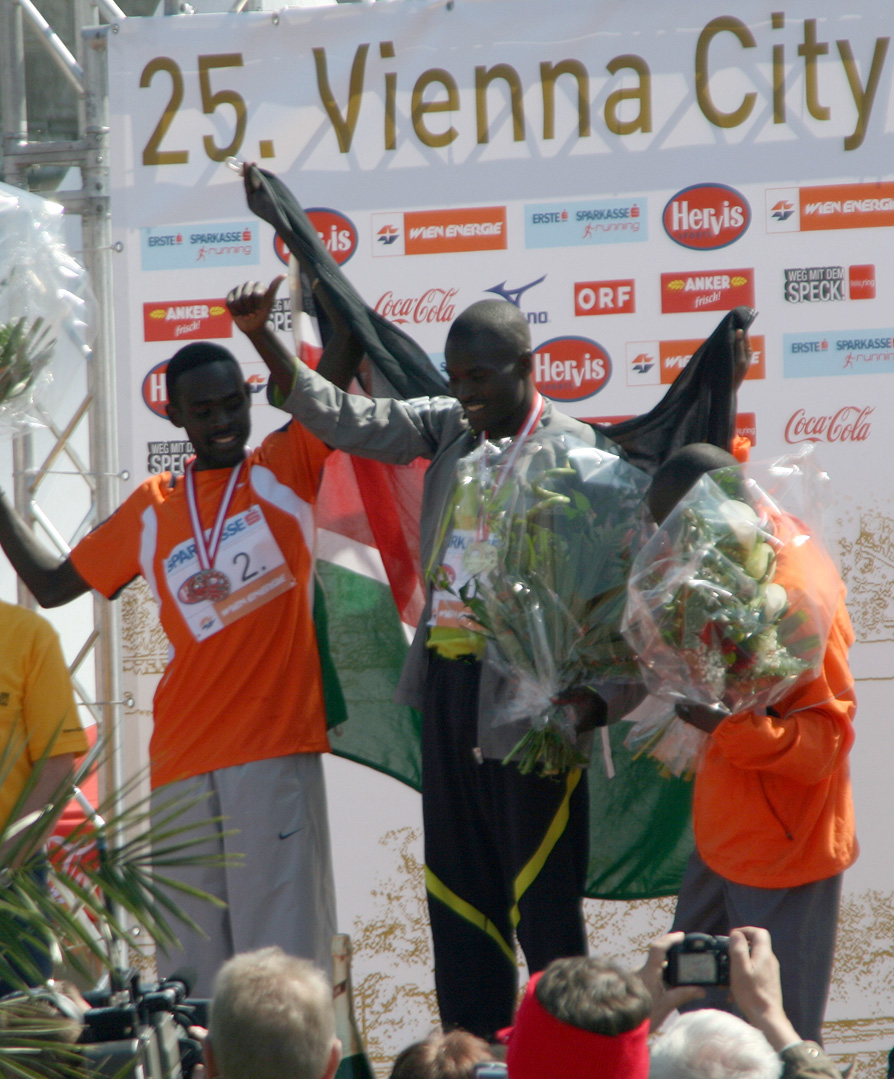
Abel Kirui celebrating his 2008 victory

| Date | Men's race | Time | Women's race | Time | Ref. |
|---|---|---|---|---|---|
| 2026.04.19 | Fanny Kiprotich (KEN) | 2:06:54 | Tigist Gezahagn (ETH) | 2:20:06 | |
| 2025.04.06 | Haftamu Abadi (ETH) | 2:08:28 | Betty Chepkemoi (KEN) | 2:24:14 | |
| 2024.04.21 | Chala Regasa (ETH) | 2:06:35 | Nazret Weldu (ERI) | 2:24:08 | |
| 2023.04.23 | Samwel Mailu (KEN) | 2:05:08 | Magdalyne Masai (KEN) | 2:24:12 | |
| 2022.04.24 | Cosmas Matolo (KEN) | 2:06:53 | Vibian Chepkirui (KEN) | 2:20:59 | |
| 2021.09.12 | Leonard Langat (KEN) (Note: Derara Hurisa crossed the finish line first, but was disqualified for wearing shoes with soles 1 cm (0.4 in) thicker than those that were allowed.) | 2:09:25 | Vibian Chepkirui (KEN) | 2:24:29 | |
| 2020 | cancelled due to coronavirus pandemic | | | | |
| 2019.04.07 | Vincent Kipchumba (KEN) | 2:06:56 | Nancy Kiprop (KEN) | 2:22:12 | |
| 2018.04.22 | Salah-Eddine Bounasr (MAR) | 2:09:29 | Nancy Kiprop (KEN) | 2:24:18 | |
| 2017.04.23 | Albert Korir (KEN) | 2:08:40 | Nancy Kiprop (KEN) | 2:24:20 | |
| 2016.04.10 | Robert Chemosin (KEN) | 2:09:48 | Shuko Genemo (ETH) | 2:24:31 | |
| 2015.04.12 | Sisay Lemma (ETH) | 2:07:31 | Maja Neuenschwander (CHE) | 2:30:09 | |
| 2014.04.13 | Getu Feleke (ETH) | 2:05:41 | Anna Hahner (GER) | 2:28:59 | |
| 2013.04.14 | Henry Sugut (KEN) | 2:08:19 | Philomena Cheyech (KEN) | 2:24:34 | |
| 2012.04.15 | Henry Sugut (KEN) | 2:06:58 | Fate Tola (ETH) | 2:26:39 | |
| 2011.04.17 | John Kiprotich (KEN) | 2:08:29 | Fate Tola (ETH) | 2:26:21 | |
| 2010.04.18 | Henry Sugut (KEN) | 2:08:40 | Hellen Kimutai (KEN) | 2:31:08 | |
| 2009.04.19 | Gilbert Kirwa (KEN) | 2:08:21 | Andrea Mayr (AUT) | 2:30:43 | |
| 2008.04.27 | Abel Kirui (KEN) | 2:07:38 | Luminița Talpoș (ROM) | 2:26:43 | |
| 2007.04.29 | Luke Kibet (KEN) | 2:10:07 | Luminița Talpoș (ROM) | 2:32:21 | |
| 2006.05.07 | Lahoussine Mrikik (MAR) | 2:08:20 | Tomo Morimoto (JPN) | 2:24:33 | |
| 2005.05.22 | Mubarak Hassan Shami (QAT) | 2:12:20 | Florence Barsosio (KEN) | 2:31:40 | |
| 2004.05.16 | Samson Kandie (KEN) | 2:08:35 | Rosaria Console (ITA) | 2:29:22 | |
| 2003.05.25 | Joseph Chebet (KEN) | 2:14:49 | Lucilla Andreucci (ITA) | 2:35:32 | |
| 2002.05.26 | Moses Tanui (KEN) | 2:10:25 | Lyudmyla Pushkina (UKR) | 2:32:03 | |
| 2001.05.20 | Luís Novo (POR) | 2:10:28 | Jane Salumäe (EST) | 2:30:00 | |
| 2000.05.21 | Willy Kipkirui (KEN) | 2:08:48 | Maura Viceconte (ITA) | 2:23:47 | |
| 1999.05.30 | Andrew Eyapan (KEN) | 2:11:41 | Florina Pană (ROM) | 2:34:26 | |
| 1998.05.24 | Moges Taye (ETH) | 2:09:21 | Irina Kazakova (FRA) | 2:35:09 | |
| 1997.05.25 | Hussein Salah (DJI) | 2:12:53 | Tatyana Polovinskaya (UKR) | 2:30:50 | |
| 1996.04.14 | Dube Jillo (ETH) | 2:12:51 | Aurica Buia (ROM) | 2:31:39 | |
| 1995.04.23 | Piotr Prusik (POL) | 2:15:23 | Helena Javornik (SLO) | 2:36:30 | |
| 1994.04.10 | Joaquim Silva (POR) | 2:10:42 | Sissel Grottenberg (NOR) | 2:36:17 | |
| 1993.04.18 | Carlos Patrício (POR) | 2:11:00 | Bente Moe (NOR) | 2:38:21 | |
| 1992.04.26 | Karel David (TCH) | 2:13:41 | Pascaline Wangui (KEN) | 2:40:50 | |
| 1991.04.14 | Karel David (TCH) | 2:12:25 | Ľudmila Melicherová (TCH) | 2:37:14 | |
| 1990.04.22 | Gidamis Shahanga (TAN) | 2:09:28 | Ľudmila Melicherová (TCH) | 2:33:19 | |
| 1989.04.16 | Alfredo Shahanga (TAN) | 2:10:28 | Christa Vahlensieck (FRG) | 2:34:47 | |
| 1988.04.10 | Mirko Vindiš (YUG) | 2:17:25 | Glynis Penny (GBR) | 2:36:49 | |
| 1987.04.05 | Gerhard Hartmann (AUT) | 2:16:10 | Carina Weber-Leutner (AUT) | 2:40:57 | |
| 1986.04.13 | Gerhard Hartmann (AUT) | 2:12:22 | Birgit Lennartz (FRG) | 2:38:31 | |
| 1985.03.31 | Gerhard Hartmann (AUT) | 2:14:59 | Yelena Tsukhlo (URS) | 2:39:01 | |
| 1984.03.25 | Antoni Niemczak (POL) | 2:12:17 | Renate Kieninger (FRG) | 2:47:32 | |

=== Half marathon ===
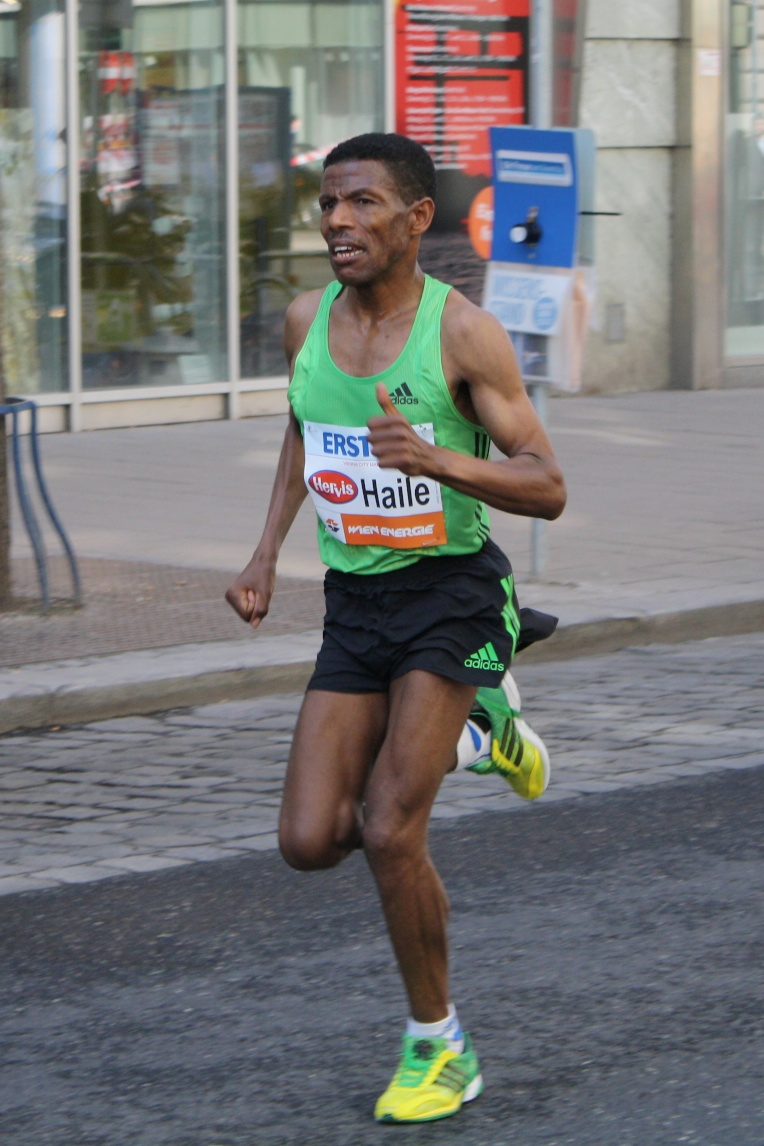
Haile Gebrselassie setting the half marathon course record in 2011

| Year | Men's race | Time | Women's race | Time |
|---|---|---|---|---|
| 2024 | Timo Hinterndorfer (AUT) | 1:03:05 | Melissa Hawtin (GBR) | 1:17:21 |
| 2023 | Markus Hartinger (AUT) | 1:06:49 | Beata Popadiak (POL) | 1:19:02 |
| 2022 | Mario Bauernfeind (AUT) | 1:05:35 | Victoria Kenny (GBR) | 1:16:16 |
| 2021 | Andreas Stöckl (AUT) | 1:12:07 | Eva Wutti (AUT) | 1:16:14 |
| 2020 | cancelled due to coronavirus pandemic | | | |
| 2019 | Mario Bauernfeind (AUT) | 1:06:44 | Katalin Garami (HUN) | 1:17:04 |
| 2018 | Adam Konieczny (POL) | 1:11:18 | Michela Ciprietti (ITA) | 1:22:57 |
| 2017 | Joé Simon (LUX) | 1:10:47 | Fabienne Amrhein (GER) | 1:14:43 |
| 2016 | Alexandru Corneschi (ROM) | 1:07:00 | Zsófia Erdélyi (HUN) | 1:15:25 |
| 2015 | Eric Rüttimann (SUI) | 1:07:39 | Susanne Mair (AUT) | 1:18:32 |
| 2014 | Mick Clohisey (IRE) | 1:06:30 | Andrea Mayr (AUT) | 1:13:46 |
| 2013 | Haile Gebrselassie (ETH) | 1:01:14 | Tanith Maxwell (RSA) | 1:17:17 |
| 2012 | Haile Gebrselassie (ETH) | 1:00:52 | Paula Radcliffe (GBR) | 1:12:03 |
| 2011 | Haile Gebrselassie (ETH) | 1:00:18 | Cristina Fruzmuz (ROU) | 1:15:43 |
| 2010 | Rudi Brunner (ITA) | 1:09:14 | Esther Erb (USA) | 1:16:25 |
| 2009 | Manfred Heit (AUT) | 1:11:45 | Catherine Wilding (GBR) | 1:24:21 |
| 2008 | Thomas Langer (GER) | 1:12:00 | Alina-Adriana Istudor (ROU) | 1:18:55 |
| 2007 | Florian Prüller (AUT) | 1:07:13 | Daniela Cârlan (ROU) | 1:16:11 |
| 2006 | Hermann Achmüller (ITA) | 1:07:57 | Kate Allen (AUT) | 1:14:24 |
| 2005 | Roman Weger (AUT) | 1:08:40 | Susanne Pumper (AUT) | 1:13:20 |
