= Haftamu Abadi =

Ethiopian long-distance runner

Personal information
- Nationality: Ethiopian
- Born: March 25, 2004 (age 22)

Sport
- Sport: Athletics
- Events: Long-distance running (10K, Half Marathon, Marathon)

Haftamu Abadi (born March 25, 2004) is an Ethiopian long-distance runner who competes in road races ranging from 10 kilometres to the marathon. He came to international attention after winning the 2025 Vienna City Marathon, becoming the youngest male winner in the event's history.

== Early life and background ==
Haftamu was born in Ethiopia on 25 March 2004. He began appearing in international competitions in his late teens, primarily in long-distance road races.

== Career ==
In 2024, he represented Ethiopia at the 2023 African Games in Accra, Ghana, competing in the men's half marathon. He placed fifth in the event.

On 6 April 2025, he claimed his first major victory by winning the 42nd Vienna City Marathon. He crossed the finish line in 2:08:28, setting a personal best and improving his previous mark by more than two minutes. The race took place in unseasonably cold weather, with temperatures at the start around 2°C. His win made him the youngest male champion in the history of the Vienna City Marathon, which has been held annually since 1984. He also won the Ljubljana marathon in Slovenia on 19 October 2025, making it so that he won two marathons in one year. He crossed the finish line with a time of 2:06:52, again setting a personal best and improving his previous mark by almost two minutes.

== Personal life ==
Following his marathon victory in Vienna, he made a public expression of gratitude on social media, referencing his Christian faith. In a post, he credited the Virgin Mary for his success. Media coverage noted that he displayed a religious image, made the sign of the cross, and knelt in prayer after crossing the finish line.

== Personal bests ==
As of June 2026, his personal best times are as follows:

- 10K Road – 27:38 (set at Herzogenaurach, Germany)
- Half Marathon – 59:56 (set at Ras Al Khaimah, United Arab Emirates)
- Marathon – 2:05:58 (set in Seoul, South Korea, on 15 March 2026)
