= Diana Kipyokei =

Kenyan long-distance runner

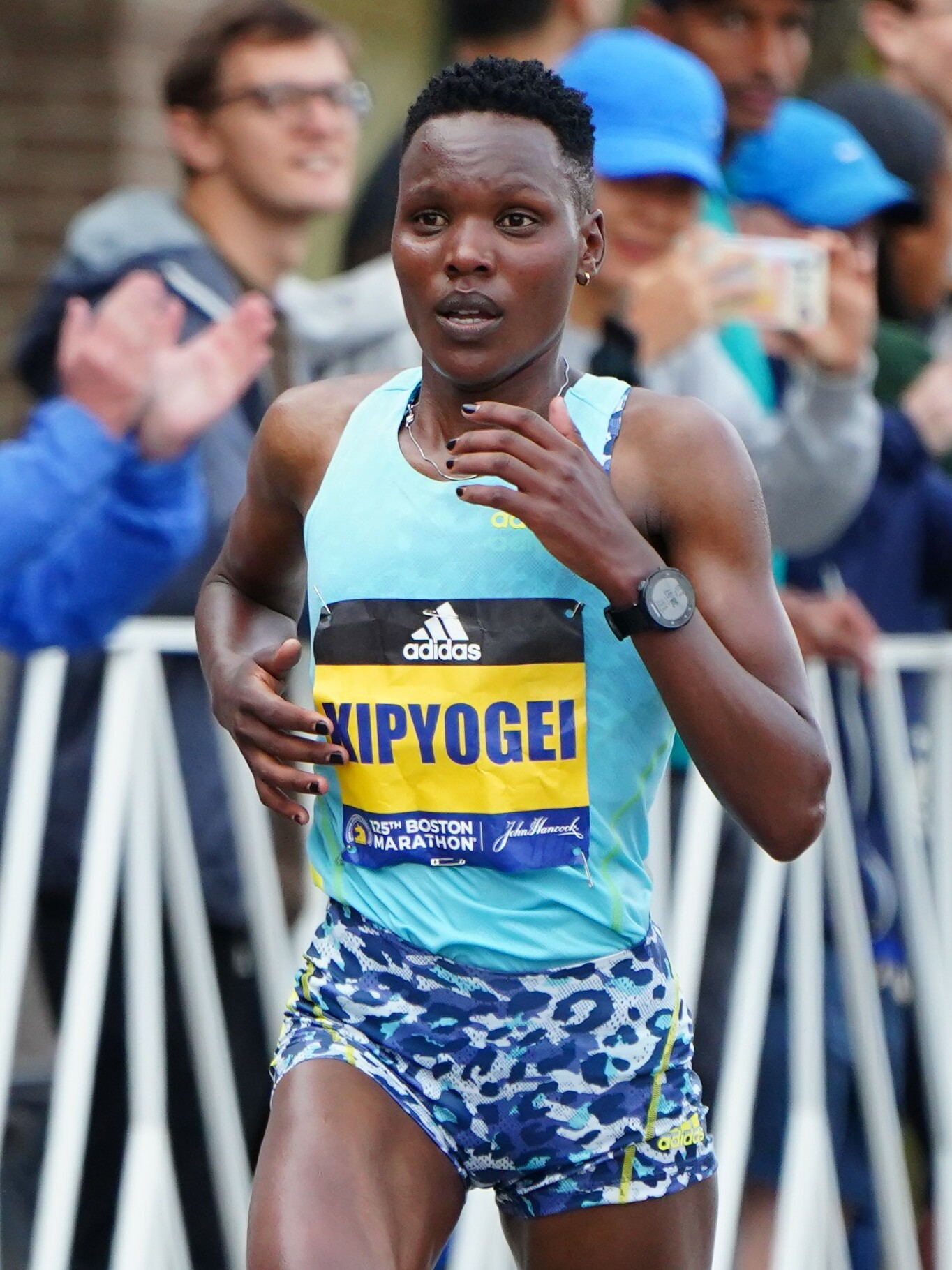
- Kipyokei running in the 2021 Boston Marathon

Personal information
- Full name: Diana Chemtai Kipyokei
- Nationality: Kenyan
- Born: 5 May 1994 (age 32)

Sport
- Country: Kenya
- Sport: Athletics
- Event: Long-distance running
Medal record
Women's athletics
Representing Kenya

Diana Chemtai Kipyokei (or Kipyogei) (born 5 May 1994) is a Kenyan long-distance runner. She won the women's race at the 2020 Istanbul Marathon (2:22:06).

== 2021 Boston Marathon and drug ban ==
Kipyokei finished first in the women's race at the 2021 Boston Marathon (2:24:45) on 11 October 2021.

In October 2022, the Athletics Integrity Unit announced that she tested positive for triamcinolone acetonide in a test taken after her win. She was provisionally suspended both for this positive test and for tampering with the doping control process. The Boston Athletic Association announced that, pending appeal, she would be stripped of her title, and the rankings and prize money would be adjusted. On 20 December, it was announced that Diana Kipyokei had been banned for six years and stripped of her Boston Marathon title, with her results disqualified from 11 October 2021 onward.

== Personal bests ==
- 10 kilometres – 30:23 (Prague 2018)
- Half marathon – 1:07:07 (Valencia 2018)
- Marathon – 2:22:06 (Istanbul 2020)
