= Coolboy Ngamole =

South African long-distance runner

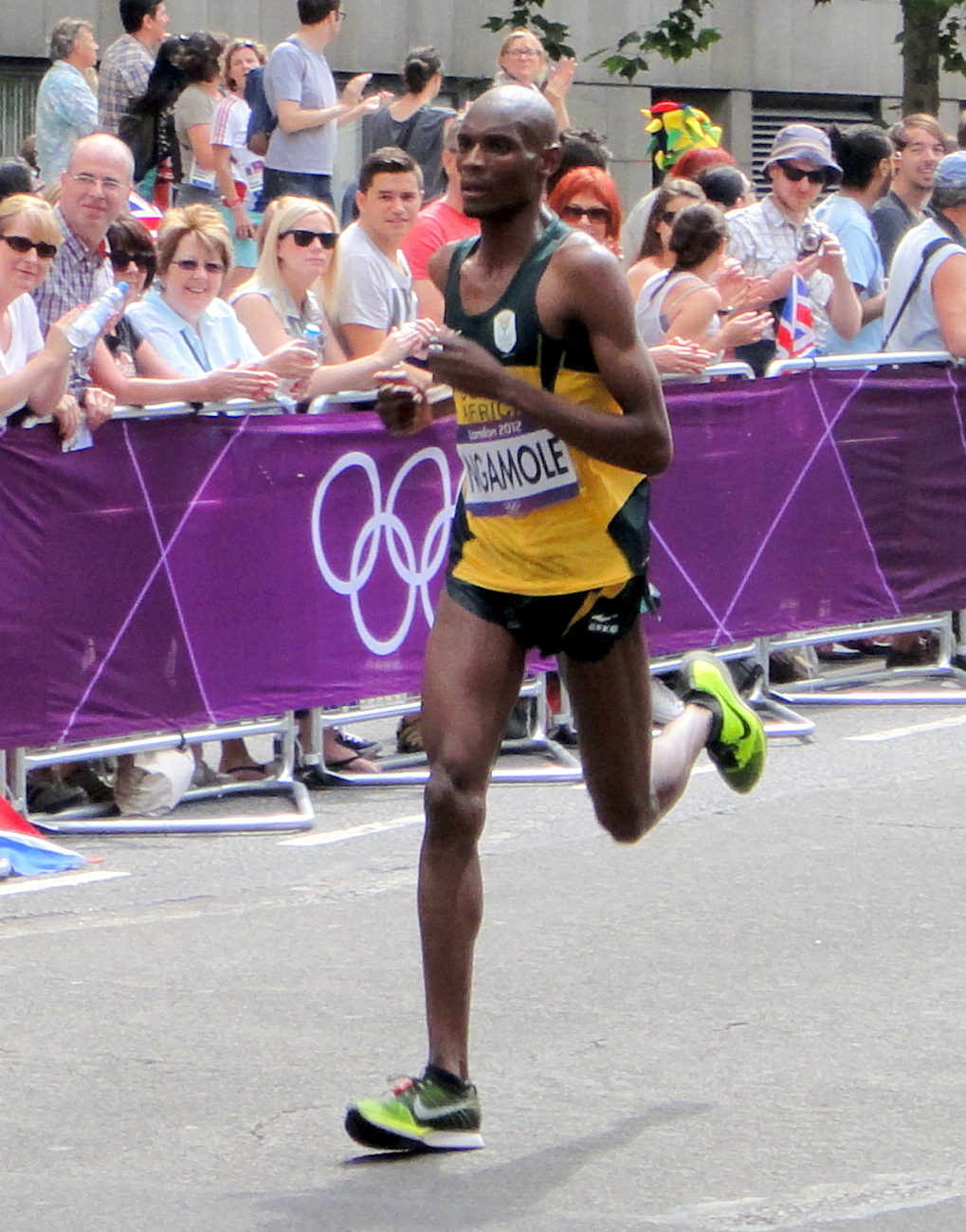
- Coolboy Ngamole in the marathon at the 2012 Olympics in London

Personal information
- Born: 21 June 1977 (age 49)
- Height: 1.67 m (5 ft 5 1/2 in)
- Weight: 58 kg (128 lb)

Sport
- Country: South Africa
- Sport: Athletics
- Event: Marathon

Coolboy Ngamole (born 21 June 1977) is a South African long-distance runner who specialises in the marathon. He competes for the Nedbank Running Club.

== Biography ==
Ngamole finished in tenth position in the men's 10,000 metres at the Athletics at the 2007 All-Africa Games in Algiers, Algeria. He finished third in the 2008 South Africa Marathon Championships in a then personal best time of two hours, fifteen minutes and eight seconds. At the 2009 World Championships in Athletics held in Berlin, Germany, Ngamole competed in the men's marathon; he finished 22nd in a season's best time of two hours, 16 minutes and 20 seconds in a race won by Abel Kirui of Kenya.

Ngamole won the South African Marathon Championships in 2010 and was runner-up in 2011. He competed in the men's marathon at the 2011 World Championships held in daegu, South Korea, finishing in 46th position in a time of two hours thirty minutes and one second.

At the 2012 South African Marathon Championships Ngamole won the race with a time of two hours, 13 minutes and 18 seconds, beating second placed Michael Mazibuko by nearly two minutes, to reclaim the title. This was the second occasion he had finished inside the Olympic 'A' qualification standard for the 2012 Summer Olympics, having run a new personal best of two hours, ten minutes and 43 seconds at a race in Valencia, Spain in November 2011.

In July 2012 Ngamole was selected to represent South Africa at the 2012 Summer Olympics in the men's marathon, where he competed alongside compatriots Lusapho April and Stephen Mokoka. The event took place on 12 August over the London Olympic street course.
