= Vibian Chepkirui =

Kenyan long-distance runner

Personal information
- Full name: Vibian Chepkirui
- Nationality: Kenyan
- Born: June 5, 1994 (age 32)

Sport
- Sport: Athletics
- Events: Long-distance running (10,000 metres, Half marathon, Marathon)

Vibian Chepkirui (born 5 June 1994) is a Kenyan long-distance runner who competes internationally in road races, particularly the marathon. She is best known for her back-to-back victories at the Vienna City Marathon, where she also set the course record in 2022.

== Career ==
Chepkirui emerged on the elite road racing scene in the early 2020s. In 2021, she recorded a personal best of 31:09.42 in the 10,000 metres and ran 1:08:02 in the half marathon in Lisbon.

She made her marathon debut at the 2021 Vienna City Marathon, winning in 2:24:29. She returned in 2022 and defended her title with a dominant performance of 2:20:59, setting a new course record and personal best.

In 2023, Chepkirui won the Publix Atlanta Half-Marathon in 1:08:45 and claimed victory at the Beijing Marathon in 2:21:57.

In 2024, she finished 13th at the Boston Marathon with a time of 2:27:23. The following year, she placed fourth at the Rotterdam Marathon in 2:22:27. Ahead of the 2025 Vienna City Marathon, she aimed to become only the second woman to win the race three times, following Nancy Kiprop. Despite a strong effort, she faced tough competition from Rebecca Tanui.

== Personal bests ==
- 10,000 metres – 31:09.42 (2021)
- Half marathon – 1:08:02 (2021)
- Marathon – 2:20:59 (Vienna, 2022)
