= Henry Sugut =

Kenyan long-distance runner

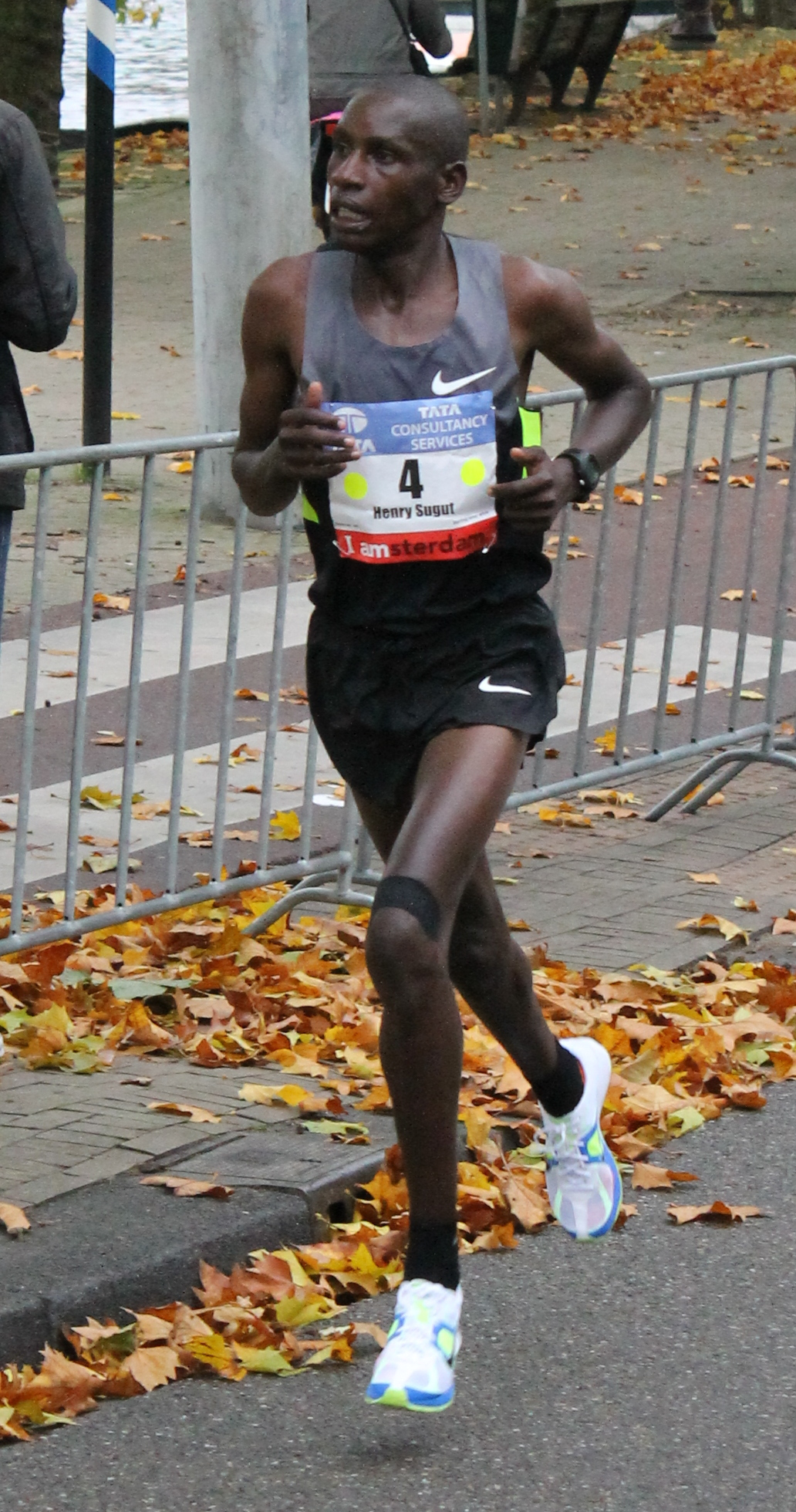
Henry Sugut at the 2012 Amsterdam Marathon

Henry Kemo Sugut (born 4 May 1985) is a male long-distance runner from Kenya who competes in marathon races. He is a three-time winner of the Vienna City Marathon. His personal best for the event is 2:06:58 hours. In his early career he ran in track races and represented Kenya at the World Junior Championships in Athletics and the All-Africa Games.

== Career ==
As a junior athlete, he competed at the 2004 World Junior Championships in Athletics and was seventh in the 5000 metres. He set his lifetime best of 13:08.90 minutes for the event at that year FBK Games. His best for the 3000 metres acme in 2006 with a run of 7:53.91 minutes. In his final year of track running in 2007 he set a personal best of 27:51.34 minutes for the 10,000 metres – a time which gained him a spot on the team for the 2007 All-Africa Games, where he placed twelfth.

After taking time out in 2008, he returned in 2009 focused on road running. In his marathon debut he came third at the Reims à Toutes Jambes with a time of 2:10:45 hours. His first victory came shortly after at the 2010 Vienna Marathon, where he took the title in a personal best of 2:08:40 hours, causing an upset over race favourites Felix Limo and Luke Kibet. Later that year he entered the higher profile Frankfurt Marathon race, but his time of 2:10:43 hours saw him finish down the field in tenth place.

Sugut ran in two large marathons in 2011: his best run came at the Paris Marathon (2:08:22 for seventh) and he came tenth for a second year running at the Frankfurt Marathon. He returned to Vienna in 2012 and ran the fastest time ever recorded in Austria, winning the race in a course record of 2:06:58 hours. In October he competed at the Amsterdam Marathon, but was again further down the order at the faster race, placing ninth. A third victory in Vienna in 2013 made him only the second man to achieve the feat, after Gerhard Hartmann.

Sugut has performed as a pacemaker for marathons, including the 2011 Tokyo Marathon where the winner Hailu Mekonnen came within twelve seconds of a course record time.

== Personal bests ==
- 3000 metres – 7:53.91 (2006)
- 5000 metres – 13:08.90 (2004)
- 10,000 metres – 27:51.34 (2007)
- Half marathon – 1:01:43 (2011)
- Marathon – 2:06:58 (2012)

== Achievements ==
Year	Competition	Venue	Position	Event	Notes
Representing Kenya
2007	All-Africa Games	Algiers, Algeria	13th	10,000 m	29:12.57
2009	Reims Marathon	Reims, France	3rd	Marathon	2:10:45
2010	Vienna Marathon	Vienna, Austria	1st	Marathon	2:08:40
2012	Vienna Marathon	Vienna, Austria	1st	Marathon	2:06:58
2013	Vienna Marathon	Vienna, Austria	1st	Marathon	2:08:19
