= Bonface Kimutai Kiplimo =

Kenyan long-distance runner

Personal information
- Nationality: Kenyan
- Born: Bonface Kimutai Kiplimo; 12 August 1995 (age 30)
- Occupation: Long-distance runner
- Years active: 2019–present

Sport
- Country: Kenya
- Sport: Athletics
- Events: Marathon, Half marathon

Achievements and titles
- Personal bests: Marathon: 2:05:05 (2023); Half marathon: 1:03:46 (2024); 10km road: 29:38 (2019)

Bonface Kimutai Kiplimo (born 12 August 1995) is a Kenyan long-distance runner who specializes in the marathon. He is known for his podium finishes at international marathons and a top-ten finish at the 2023 Berlin Marathon, where he set his personal best of 2:05:05.

== Career ==
Kiplimo began competing in international road races in 2019. He achieved a podium finish at the 2023 Enschede Marathon, placing third with a time of 2:09:19.

His major breakthrough came later that year at the 2023 Berlin Marathon, one of the World Marathon Majors. In a deeply competitive field, Kiplimo finished in 10th place, running a significant personal best of 2:05:05. This result established him as a world-class marathoner.

In 2025, Kiplimo continued his strong performances by securing second place at the Maraton de Cali in Colombia with a time of 2:11:27.

== Achievements ==
All information from World Athletics profile unless otherwise noted.

Year	Competition	Venue	Position	Event	Notes
2025	Maraton de Cali	Cali, Colombia	2nd	Marathon	2:11:27
2024	Generali Berlin Half Marathon	Berlin, Germany	16th	Half marathon	1:03:46
2023	Berlin Marathon	Berlin, Germany	10th	Marathon	2:05:05 (PB)
2023	Enschede Marathon	Enschede, Netherlands	3rd	Marathon	2:09:19
2022	Frankfurt Marathon	Frankfurt, Germany	6th	Marathon	2:11:08
