= Karel David =

Czech long-distance runner

Personal information
- Born: 8 February 1964 (age 62) Nový Jičín, Czechoslovakia

Sport
- Sport: Marathon running

Karel David (born 8 February 1964) is a Czech retired long-distance runner. He won the 1991 and 1992 edition of the Vienna Marathon. David represented Czechoslovakia twice in the men's marathon (1988 and 1992) at the Summer Olympics. He set his personal best time (2:11:57) on 23 May 1993 at the Hamburg Marathon which as of April 2024 is still the national record of the Czech Republic.

== Achievements ==
Year	Competition	Venue	Position	Event	Notes
Representing Czechoslovakia
1988	Olympic Games	Seoul, South Korea	55th	Marathon	2:26:12
1989	Universiade	Duisburg, West Germany	5th	Marathon	2:16:31
1989	Košice Peace Marathon	Košice, Czechoslovakia	1st	Marathon	2:18:39
1990	European Championships	Split, Yugoslavia	7th	Marathon	2:18:05
1991	Vienna Marathon	Vienna, Austria	1st	Marathon	2:12:25
1992	Vienna Marathon	Vienna, Austria	1st	Marathon	2:13:41
1992	Olympic Games	Barcelona, Spain	19th	Marathon	2:16:34
Representing Czech Republic
1995	World Championships	Gothenburg, Sweden	—	Marathon	DNF
1997	World Championships	Athens, Greece	32nd	Marathon	2:24:42
