= Nancy Kiprop =

Kenyan long-distance runner

Personal information
- Born: 7 July 1979 (age 46)

Sport
- Country: Kenya
- Sport: Athletics
- Event: Long-distance running

Nancy Jepkosgei Kiprop (Note: In some sources: Nancy Jepkosgei Kipron) (born 7 July 1979) is a Kenyan long-distance runner. She won the Vienna City Marathon in 2017, 2018 and in 2019. In 2019 she also set a new course record of 2:22:12.

== Career ==
In 2005, she won the Almond Blossom Cross Country, a distance of 8,000 metres, with a time of 19:35.

In 2008, she won the Parelloop held in Brunssum, Netherlands with a time of 32:43.

In 2014, she won the women's 10 kilometres event at the Lidingöloppet with a time of 34:24.

In 2016, she won the Granollers Half Marathon with a time of 1:11:30.

In 2018, she finished in 2nd place in the Ústí nad Labem Half Marathon with a time of 1:07:32.

In the 2019 New York City Marathon she finished in 4th place.

== Achievements ==
Year	Competition	Venue	Position	Event	Notes
Representing Kenya
2005	Almond Blossom Cross Country	Albufeira, Portugal	1st	8,000 m	19:35
2008	Parelloop	Brunssum, Netherlands	1st	10,000 m	32:43
2014	Lidingöloppet	Lidingö, Sweden	1st	10,000 m	34:24
2016	Granollers Half Marathon	Granollers, Spain	1st	Marathon	1:11:30
2017	Vienna City Marathon	Vienna, Austria	1st	Marathon	2:24:20
2018	Vienna City Marathon	Vienna, Austria	1st	Marathon	2:24:18
2018	Ústí nad Labem Half Marathon	Ústí nad Labem, Czech Republic	2nd	Half marathon	1:07:32
2019	Vienna City Marathon	Vienna, Austria	1st	Marathon	2:22:12
2019	New York City Marathon	New York City, United States	4th	Marathon	2:26:21
