= Praterstern =

Intersection and area in Leopoldstadt, Vienna

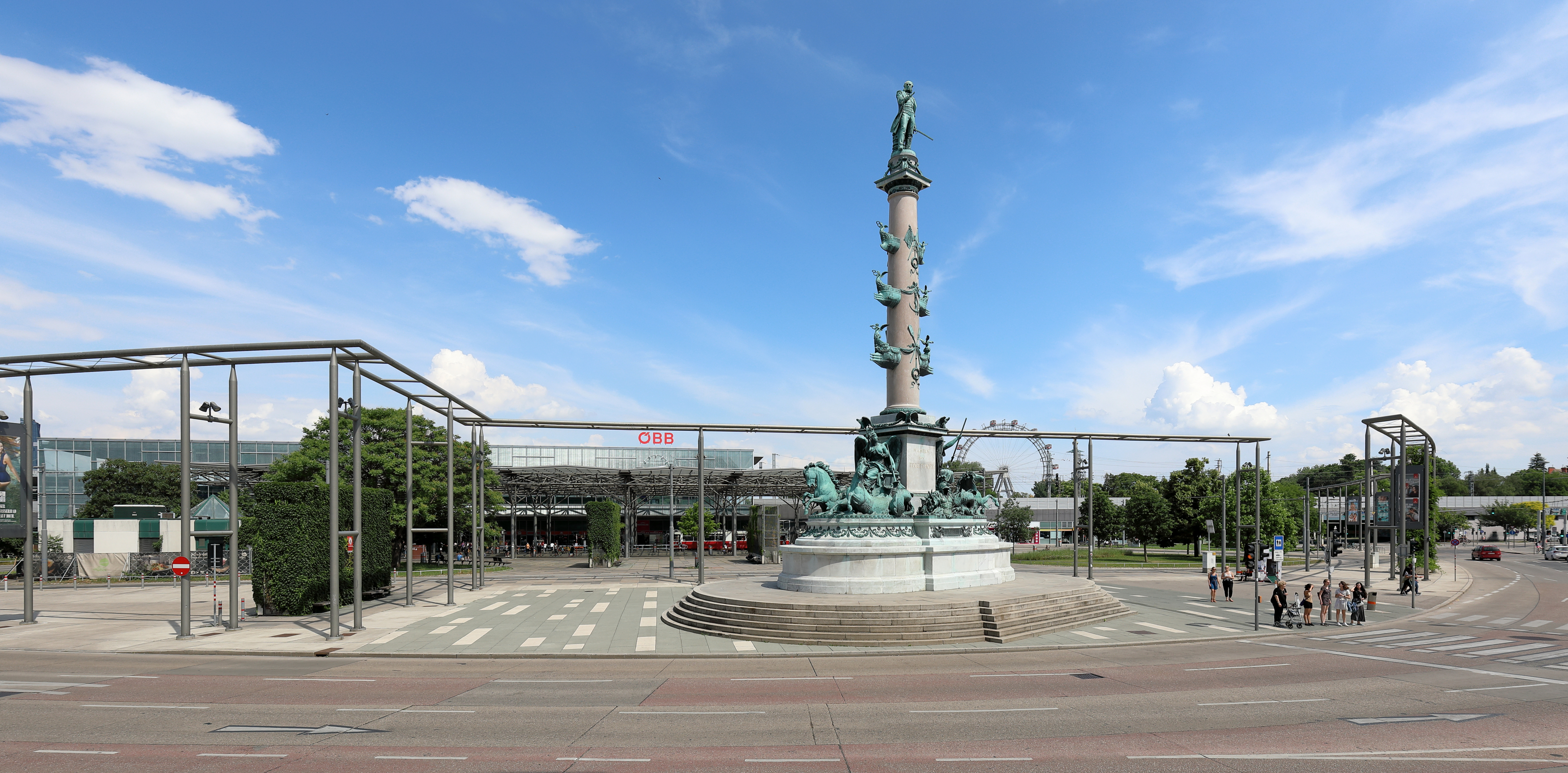
Praterstern with Tegetthoff's Column

Praterstern is a major square in the Leopoldstadt district of Vienna, Austria.

The square features the column to Admiral Wilhelm von Tegetthoff.

Located and named after it are the Wien Praterstern railway station, and the connecting U-Bahn station Praterstern, on lines U1 and U2.
