= Tadu Abate =

Ethiopian long-distance runner

Personal information
- Nationality: Ethiopian
- Born: Deme Tadu Abate; 11 September 1997 (age 28) Arsi, Ethiopia
- Occupation: long-distance runner
- Years active: 2017–present

Sport
- Country: Ethiopia
- Sport: Athletics
- Events: Marathon, Half marathon, 10K road

Achievements and titles
- Personal bests: Marathon: 2:05:38 (2023); Half marathon: 1:00:10 (2017); 10 km road: 29:08 (2021)

Tadu Abate (born 11 September 1997) is an Ethiopian long-distance runner specializing in marathon and half marathon events. He has achieved significant results in major international road races, including podium finishes and a major marathon victory.

== Career ==
Tadu Abate, also known as Deme Tadu Abate, began his professional running career in 2017. He gained early experience as one of the pacemakers in the Breaking2 project in Monza, Italy. He debuted in the half marathon with a personal best of 1:00:10 in 2017. His current half marathon personal best is 1:00:46, set in Lisbon in March 2017. He also holds a 10-kilometer road personal best of 29:08, set in Addis Ababa in January 2021.

He has quickly adapted to marathon running, achieving podium finishes in his first three marathons. His marathon personal best is 2:05:38, set at the Tokyo Marathon on March 5, 2023, where he finished sixth.

Notable marathon and half marathon performances include:

- Winning the Hamburg Marathon in 2019 with a time of 2:08:25 in challenging conditions. He had previously finished second at the Hamburg Marathon in 2018, clocking 2:06:54 (a personal best at the time).
- Improving his personal best to 2:06:13 at the Amsterdam Marathon in 2019.
- Finishing third at the BMW Berlin Marathon in 2022 with a time of 2:06:28.
- Placing fourth at the 2021 BMW Berlin Marathon in 2:08:24.
- Winning the Wuxi Marathon in 2024 with a course record of 2:06:18.
- Winning the **Guadalajara Half Marathon** in 2024.
- Finishing seventh at the TCS Sydney Marathon in 2024 with 2:10:12.

== Achievements ==
Year	Race	City	Position	Time
2018	Hamburg Marathon	Hamburg	2nd	2:06:54
2018	Amsterdam Marathon	Amsterdam	7th	2:06:47
2019	Hamburg Marathon	Hamburg	1st	2:08:25
2019	Amsterdam Marathon	Amsterdam	6th	2:06:13
2021	Berlin Marathon	Berlin	4th	2:08:24
2022	Enschede Marathon	Enschede	3rd	2:07:59
2022	Berlin Marathon	Berlin	3rd	2:06:28
2023	Tokyo Marathon	Tokyo	6th	2:05:38 (PB)
2024	Wuxi Marathon	Wuxi	1st	2:06:18 (CR)
2024	Guadalajara Half Marathon	Guadalajara	1st	1:01:21
2024	TCS Sydney Marathon	Sydney	7th	2:10:12
2026	TATA Mumbai Marathon	Mumbai	1st	2:09:55
