= Tigist Abayechew =

Ethiopian long-distance runner

Personal information
- Nationality: Ethiopian
- Born: 22 February 1994 (age 31)

Sport
- Sport: Athletics
- Event(s): Long-distance running (Marathon, Half Marathon, 10,000m)

Tigist Abayechew (born 22 February 1994) is an Ethiopian long-distance runner who specializes in marathon and track events.

== Career ==
Abayechew started her career on the track, achieving a personal best in the 10,000 metres in 2014. She later transitioned to road racing, with a focus on the marathon.

She made her marathon debut in 2017 at the Taiyuan Marathon in China, finishing second with a time of 2:30:11. In 2019, she improved significantly, finishing runner-up at the Istanbul Marathon with 2:24:15. She also competed for Ethiopia at the World Championships in Doha, finishing eighth in the 5000m final.

Her most significant marathon performance came at the 2022 Berlin Marathon, where she ran a personal best of 2:18:03 to finish third.

After an injury, she made a comeback, finishing ninth at the Tokyo Marathon in March 2025. She was also among the elite athletes listed for the 2024 Mainova Frankfurt Marathon, where she was considered the fastest woman ever entered for the event at that time, based on her 2:18:03 personal best.

== Personal bests ==
As of May 2025, Abayechew's personal bests are:

- 10,000 metres – 33:06.75 (10 June 2014)
- Half Marathon – 1:10:13 (21 April 2019)
- Marathon – 2:18:03 (Berlin, 25 September 2022)
