= List of Romanian football champions =

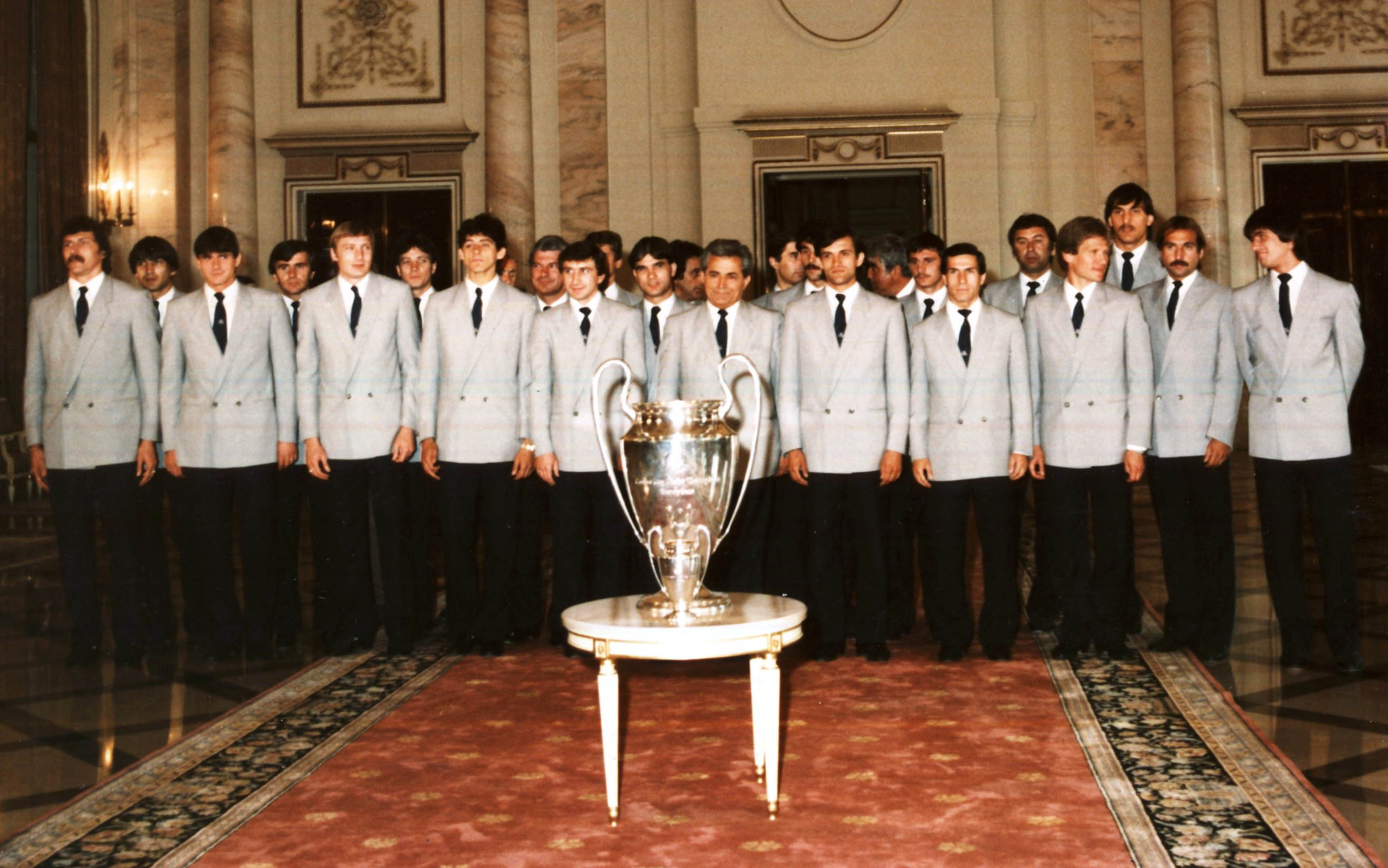
Steaua București after winning the 1985–86 European Cup.

The Romanian football champions (Romanian: campionii României la fotbal) are the winners of Romania's top-tier annual association football championship, currently known as the SuperLiga. The championship has been contested since 1909 under several formats and names.

As of the end of the 2025–26 season, this list counts 108 championship editions. Steaua București holds the first place with 20 titles. (Note: For this list, the titles won under the names CCA București and Steaua București are grouped with FCSB, following the aggregation used by RSSSF. The ownership and continuity of the historical Steaua record have been subject to legal dispute; see Steaua București football records dispute.) Dinamo București is second with 18 titles and CFR Cluj third with eight. Venus București is credited here with seven championships, followed by UTA Arad and Chinezul Timișoara with six each, and Universitatea Craiova with five. (Note: The attribution of the 1920–21 title is disputed. RomanianSoccer's reconstruction records Tricolor București as champion and states that the documentary evidence does not justify crediting Venus with that title, while RSSSF lists Venus as champion and therefore gives Venus eight titles.) (Note: This list groups the historical Universitatea Craiova league record with CS Universitatea Craiova. The Liga Profesionistă de Fotbal described the 2025–26 championship as returning the title to Craiova after 35 years, treating 1990–91 as the previous title. Legal ownership of the 1948–1991 palmarès remains disputed; in February 2026 the Timișoara Court of Appeal rejected an appeal by Club Sportiv Universitatea Craiova, with a further appeal reported as possible.)

The first championship, 1909–10, involved Olympia București, Colentina București and United AC Ploiești in a small league competition, with Olympia București recognized as champion. Beginning with 1921–22, regional champions from across Greater Romania qualified for a national knock-out stage. A national league format was introduced in 1932–33, initially with two groups followed by a final. No official championship was completed between 1916 and 1919 because of World War I, or between 1941 and 1946 during and immediately after World War II. The top flight was known as Divizia A for most of its history and was renamed Liga I in 2006 following a trademark dispute.

From the mid-1950s, the Romanian champion qualified for the European Champion Clubs' Cup, the predecessor of the modern UEFA Champions League. The most successful Romanian club in the competition is Steaua București: it won the 1985–86 European Cup and reached the final again in 1988–89.

The 2015–16 season introduced a play-off–play-out format. Fourteen teams played each other twice in a 26-match regular season; the top six advanced to the championship play-off and the bottom eight to the relegation play-out, with regular-season points halved for the second phase.

== List ==
The figures in parentheses after each winner show the title won in that season as an ordinal over the total number of championships credited to that club in this list (for example, 27/28).

=== Early championships (1909–1921) ===
| Season | Winner | Runner-up | Third place | Note |
|---|---|---|---|---|
| 1909–10 | Olympia București (1/2) | Colentina București | United Ploiești | |
| 1910–11 | Olympia București (2/2) | United Ploiești | Colentina București | |
| 1911–12 | United Ploiești (1/2) | Colentina București | Olympia București | |
| 1912–13 | Colentina București (1/2) | Bukarester FC | Cercul Atletic București | |
| 1913–14 | Colentina București (2/2) | Bukarester FC | Cercul Atletic București | |
| 1914–15 | Româno-Americană București (1/1) | Prahova Ploiești | Colentina București | |
| 1915–16 | Prahova Ploiești (2/2) | Bukarester FC | Colțea București | |
| 1916–19 | Cancelled due to World War I. | | | ^{[A]} |
| 1919–20 | Venus București (1/7) | Tricolor București | Colțea București | |
| 1920–21 | Tricolor București (1/2) | Venus București | Prahova Ploiești | |

=== National championship / Divizia A (1921–2006) ===
| Season | Winner | Runner-up | Third place | Top scorer (Club – Goals) | Note |
|---|---|---|---|---|---|
| 1921–22 | Chinezul Timișoara (1/6) | Victoria Cluj | AMEF Arad | not available^{[B]} | |
| 1922–23 | Chinezul Timișoara (2/6) | Victoria Cluj | Venus București | not available^{[B]} | |
| 1923–24 | Chinezul Timișoara (3/6) | CA Oradea | Mureșul Târgu Mureș | not available^{[B]} | |
| 1924–25 | Chinezul Timișoara (4/6) | UCAS Petroșani | Jahn Cernăuți | not available^{[B]} | |
| 1925–26 | Chinezul Timișoara (5/6) | Juventus București | Vagonul Arad | not available^{[B]} | |
| 1926–27 | Chinezul Timișoara (6/6) | Colțea Brașov | Unirea Tricolor București | not available^{[B]} | |
| 1927–28 | Colțea Brașov (1/1) | Jiul Lupeni | Mihai Viteazul Chișinău | not available^{[B]} | |
| 1928–29 | Venus București (2/7) | România Cluj | Banatul Timișoara | not available^{[B]} | |
| 1929–30 | Juventus București (1/4) | Gloria CFR Arad | Universitatea Cluj | not available^{[B]} | |
| 1930–31 | UD Reșița (1/1) | Societatea Gimnastică Sibiu | Prahova Ploiești | not available^{[B]} | |
| 1931–32 | Venus București (3/7) | UD Reșița | Mureșul Târgu Mureș | not available^{[B]} | |
| 1932–33 | Ripensia Timișoara (1/4) | Universitatea Cluj | CFR București | (Romania) Ștefan Dobay (Ripensia Timișoara – 16) | |
| 1933–34 | Venus București (4/7) | Ripensia Timișoara | Unirea Tricolor București | (Romania) Ștefan Dobay (Ripensia Timișoara – 25) | |
| 1934–35 | Ripensia Timișoara (2/4) | CA Oradea | Venus București | (Romania) Ștefan Dobay (Ripensia Timișoara – 24) | |
| 1935–36 | Ripensia Timișoara (3/4) | AMEF Arad | Juventus București | (Romania) Ștefan Barbu (CFR București – 23) | |
| 1936–37 | Venus București (5/7) | Rapid București | Ripensia Timișoara | (Romania) Ștefan Dobay (Ripensia – 21) (Romania) Traian Iordache (Unirea Tricolor București – 21) | |
| 1937–38 | Ripensia Timișoara (4/4) | Rapid București | Venus București | (Romania) Ludovic Thierjung (Chinezul Timișoara – 22) | |
| 1938–39 | Venus București (6/7) | Ripensia Timișoara | AMEF Arad | (Romania) (Hungary) Adalbert Marksteiner (Ripensia Timișoara – 21) | |
| 1939–40 | Venus București (7/7) | Rapid București | Sportul Studențesc București | (Romania) (Hungary) István Avar (Rapid București – 21) | |
| 1940–41 | Unirea Tricolor București (2/2) | Rapid București | Ripensia Timișoara | (Romania) Ion Bogdan (Rapid București – 21) (Romania) Valeriu Niculescu (Unirea Tricolor București – 21) | |
| 1941–46 | No official national championship was completed. Wartime and unofficial competitions were played, including the 1942 Heroes Cup and the 1942–43 wartime championship. | | | | ^{[C]} |
| 1946–47 | ITA Arad (1/6) | Carmen București | CFR Timișoara | (Romania) Ladislau Bonyhádi (ITA Arad – 26) | |
| 1947–48 | ITA Arad (2/6) | CFR Timișoara | CFR București | (Romania) Ladislau Bonyhádi (ITA Arad – 49) | |
| 1948–49 | IC Oradea (1/1) | CFR București | Jiul Petroșani | (Romania) Gheorghe Váczi (IC Oradea – 24) | |
| 1950 | Flamura Roșie Arad (3/6) | Locomotiva București | Știința Timișoara | (Romania) Andrei Rădulescu (Locomotiva București – 18) | |
| 1951 | CCA București (1/28) | Dinamo București | Progresul Oradea | (Romania) Gheorghe Váczi (Progresul Oradea – 23) | |
| 1952 | CCA București (2/28) | Dinamo București | CA Câmpulung Moldovenesc | (Romania) Titus Ozon (Dinamo București – 17) | |
| 1953 | CCA București (3/28) | Dinamo București | Flamura Roșie Arad | (Romania) Titus Ozon (Dinamo București – 12) | |
| 1954 | Flamura Roșie Arad (4/6) | CCA București | Dinamo București | (Romania) Alexandru Ene (Dinamo București – 20) | |
| 1955 | Dinamo București (1/18) | Flacăra Ploiești | Progresul București | (Romania) Ion Ciosescu (Știința Timișoara – 18) | |
| 1956 | CCA București (4/28) | Dinamo București | Știința Timișoara | (Romania) Ion Alecsandrescu (CCA București – 18) | |
| 1957–58 | Petrolul Ploiești (2/4) | CCA București | Știința Timișoara | (Romania) Ion Ciosescu (Știința Timișoara – 21) | |
| 1958–59 | Petrolul Ploiești (3/4) | Dinamo București | CCA București | (Romania) Gheorghe Ene (Rapid București – 17) | |
| 1959–60 | CCA București (5/28) | Steagul Roșu Orașul Stalin | Petrolul Ploiești | (Romania) Gheorghe Constantin (CCA București – 20) | |
| 1960–61 | CCA București (6/28) | Dinamo București | Rapid București | (Romania) Gheorghe Constantin (CCA București – 22) | |
| 1961–62 | Dinamo București (2/18) | Petrolul Ploiești | Progresul București | (Romania) Gheorghe Constantin (Steaua București – 24) | |
| 1962–63 | Dinamo București (3/18) | Steaua București | Știința Timișoara | (Romania) Ion Ionescu (Rapid București – 20) | |
| 1963–64 | Dinamo București (4/18) | Rapid București | Steaua București | (Romania) Constantin Frăţilă (Dinamo București – 19) (Romania) Cornel Pavlovici (Steaua București – 19) | |
| 1964–65 | Dinamo București (5/18) | Rapid București | Steaua București | (Romania) Mihai Adam (Știința Cluj – 18) | |
| 1965–66 | Petrolul Ploiești (4/4) | Rapid București | Dinamo București | (Romania) Ion Ionescu (Rapid București – 24) | |
| 1966–67 | Rapid București (1/3) | Dinamo București | Universitatea Craiova | (Romania) Ion Oblemenco (Universitatea Craiova – 17) | |
| 1967–68 | Steaua București (7/28) | FC Argeș Pitești | Dinamo București | (Romania) Mihai Adam (Universitatea Cluj – 15) | |
| 1968–69 | UTA Arad (5/6) | Dinamo București | Rapid București | (Romania) Florea Dumitrache (Dinamo București – 22) | |
| 1969–70 | UTA Arad (6/6) | Rapid București | Steaua București | (Romania) Ion Oblemenco (Universitatea Craiova – 19) | |
| 1970–71 | Dinamo București (6/18) | Rapid București | Steaua București | (Romania) Constantin Moldoveanu (Poli Iași – 15) (Romania) Florea Dumitrache (Dinamo București – 15) (Romania) Gheorghe Tătaru (Steaua București – 15) | |
| 1971–72 | FC Argeș Pitești (1/2) | UTA Arad | Universitatea Cluj | (Romania) Ion Oblemenco (Universitatea Craiova – 20) | |
| 1972–73 | Dinamo București (7/18) | Universitatea Craiova | FC Argeș Pitești | (Romania) Ion Oblemenco (Universitatea Craiova – 21) | |
| 1973–74 | Universitatea Craiova (1/5) | Dinamo București | Steagul Roșu Brașov | (Romania) Mihai Adam (CFR Cluj – 23) | |
| 1974–75 | Dinamo București (8/18) | ASA Târgu Mureș | Universitatea Craiova | (Romania) Dudu Georgescu (Dinamo București – 33) | |
| 1975–76 | Steaua București (8/28) | Dinamo București | ASA Târgu Mureș | (Romania) Dudu Georgescu (Dinamo București – 31) | |
| 1976–77 | Dinamo București (9/18) | Steaua București | Universitatea Craiova | (Romania) Dudu Georgescu (Dinamo București – 47) | |
| 1977–78 | Steaua București (9/28) | FC Argeș Pitești | Politehnica Timișoara | (Romania) Dudu Georgescu (Dinamo București – 24) | |
| 1978–79 | FC Argeș Pitești (2/2) | Dinamo București | Steaua București | (Romania) Marin Radu (FC Argeș – 22) | |
| 1979–80 | Universitatea Craiova (2/5) | Steaua București | FC Argeș Pitești | (Romania) Septimiu Câmpeanu (Universitatea Cluj – 24) | |
| 1980–81 | Universitatea Craiova (3/5) | Dinamo București | FC Argeș Pitești | (Romania) Marin Radu (FC Argeș – 28) | |
| 1981–82 | Dinamo București (10/18) | Universitatea Craiova | Corvinul Hunedoara | (Romania) Anghel Iordănescu (Steaua București – 20) | |
| 1982–83 | Dinamo București (11/18) | Universitatea Craiova | Sportul Studențesc București | (Romania) Petre Grosu (FC Bihor Oradea – 20) | |
| 1983–84 | Dinamo București (12/18) | Steaua București | Universitatea Craiova | (Romania) Marcel Coraș (Sportul Studențesc București – 20) (Note: Sources disagree on Coraș's 1983–84 league total. RSSSF and the LPF archive list 20 goals, while RomanianSoccer and some published historical compilations list 18.) | |
| 1984–85 | Steaua București (10/28) | Dinamo București | Sportul Studențesc București | (Romania) Gheorghe Hagi (Sportul Studențesc București – 20) | |
| 1985–86 | Steaua București (11/28) | Sportul Studențesc București | Universitatea Craiova | (Romania) Gheorghe Hagi (Sportul Studențesc București – 31) | |
| 1986–87 | Steaua București (12/28) | Dinamo București | Victoria București | (Romania) Rodion Cămătaru (Dinamo București – 44) | |
| 1987–88 | Steaua București (13/28) | Dinamo București | Victoria București | (Romania) Victor Pițurcă (Steaua București – 34) | |
| 1988–89 | Steaua București (14/28) | Dinamo București | Victoria București | (Romania) Dorin Mateuț (Dinamo București – 43) | |
| 1989–90 | Dinamo București (13/18) | Steaua București | Universitatea Craiova | (Romania) Gavril Balint ( Steaua București – 19) | |
| 1990–91 | Universitatea Craiova (4/5) | Steaua București | Dinamo București | (Romania) Ovidiu Cornel Hanganu (Corvinul Hunedoara – 24) | |
| 1991–92 | Dinamo București (14/18) | Steaua București | Electroputere Craiova | (Romania) Gábor Gerstenmájer (Dinamo București – 21) | |
| 1992–93 | Steaua București (15/28) | Dinamo București | Universitatea Craiova | (Romania) Ilie Dumitrescu (Steaua București – 24) | |
| 1993–94 | Steaua București (16/28) | Universitatea Craiova | Dinamo București | (Romania) Gheorghe Craioveanu (Universitatea Craiova – 22) | |
| 1994–95 | Steaua București (17/28) | Universitatea Craiova | Dinamo București | (Romania) Gheorghe Craioveanu (Universitatea Craiova – 27) | |
| 1995–96 | Steaua București (18/28) | Național București | Rapid București | (Romania) Ion Vlădoiu (Steaua București – 25) | |
| 1996–97 | Steaua București (19/28) | Național București | Dinamo București | (Romania) Sabin Ilie (Steaua București – 31) | |
| 1997–98 | Steaua București (20/28) | Rapid București | FC Argeș Pitești | (Romania) Vasile Oană (Gloria Bistrița – 22) (Note: RomanianSoccer lists Oană and Constantin Barbu level on 21 goals, while RSSSF and contemporary Romanian sports retrospectives list Oană on 22 and Barbu on 21.) | |
| 1998–99 | Rapid București (2/3) | Dinamo București | Steaua București | (Romania) Ionel Ganea (Gloria Bistrita – 28) | |
| 1999–00 | Dinamo București (15/18) | Rapid București | Steaua București | (Romania) Marian Savu (FC Național București – 20) | |
| 2000–01 | Steaua București (21/28) | Dinamo București | FC Brașov | (Romania) Marius Niculae (Dinamo București – 20) | |
| 2001–02 | Dinamo București (16/18) | Național București | Rapid București | (Romania) Cătălin Cursaru (FCM Bacău – 17) | |
| 2002–03 | Rapid București (3/3) | Steaua București | Gloria Bistrița | (Romania) Claudiu Răducanu (AFC Steaua – 21) | |
| 2003–04 | Dinamo București (17/18) | Steaua București | Rapid București | (Romania) Ionel Dănciulescu (Dinamo București – 21) | |
| 2004–05 | Steaua București (22/28) | Dinamo București | Rapid București | (Romania) Gheorghe Bucur (Sportul Studențesc București – 21) (Romania) Claudiu Niculescu (Dinamo București – 21) | |
| 2005–06 | Steaua București (23/28) | Rapid București | Dinamo București | (Romania) Ionuț Mazilu (Sportul Studențesc București – 22) | |

=== Liga I (2006–present) ===
| Season | Winner | Runner-up | Third place | Top scorer (Club – Goals) | Note |
|---|---|---|---|---|---|
| 2006–07 | Dinamo București (18/18) | Steaua București | CFR Cluj | (Romania) Claudiu Niculescu (Dinamo București – 18) | |
| 2007–08 | CFR Cluj (1/8) | Steaua București | Rapid București | (Romania) Ionel Dănciulescu (Dinamo București – 21) | |
| 2008–09 | Unirea Urziceni (1/1) | FC Timișoara | Dinamo București | (Romania) Gheorghe Bucur (FC Timișoara – 17) (Romania) Florin Costea (FC U Craiova – 17) | |
| 2009–10 | CFR Cluj (2/8) | Unirea Urziceni | FC Vaslui | (Romania) Andrei Cristea (Dinamo București – 16) | |
| 2010–11 | Oțelul Galați (1/1) | FC Timișoara | FC Vaslui | (Romania) Ianis Zicu (FC Timișoara – 18) | |
| 2011–12 | CFR Cluj (3/8) | FC Vaslui | Steaua București | (Brazil) Wesley (FC Vaslui – 27) | |
| 2012–13 | Steaua București (24/28) | Pandurii Târgu Jiu | Petrolul Ploiești | (Romania) Raul Rusescu (FCSB – 21) | |
| 2013–14 | Steaua București (25/28) | Astra Giurgiu | Petrolul Ploiești | (Romania) Liviu Antal (FC Vaslui – 15) | |
| 2014–15 | Steaua București (26/28) | ASA 2013 Târgu Mureș | CFR Cluj | (France) Grégory Tadé (CFR Cluj – 18) | |
| 2015–16 | Astra Giurgiu (1/1) | Steaua București | Pandurii Târgu Jiu | (Romania) Ioan Hora (Pandurii Târgu Jiu – 19) | |
| 2016–17 | Viitorul Constanța (1/2) | Steaua București | Dinamo București | (Albania) Azdren Llullaku (Gaz Metan Mediaș – 16) | |
| 2017–18 | CFR Cluj (4/8) | Steaua București | Universitatea Craiova | (Romania) George Țucudean (Viitorul Constanța, CFR Cluj – 15) (France) Harlem Gnohéré (FCSB – 15) | |
| 2018–19 | CFR Cluj (5/8) | FCSB | Viitorul Constanța | (Romania) George Țucudean (CFR Cluj – 18) | |
| 2019–20 | CFR Cluj (6/8) | Universitatea Craiova | Astra Giurgiu | (Romania) Gabriel Iancu (Viitorul Constanța – 18) | |
| 2020–21 | CFR Cluj (7/8) | FCSB | Universitatea Craiova | (Romania) Florin Tănase (FCSB – 24) | |
| 2021–22 | CFR Cluj (8/8) | FCSB | Universitatea Craiova | (Romania) Florin Tănase (FCSB – 20) | |
| 2022–23 | Farul Constanța (2/2) | FCSB | CFR Cluj | (Croatia) Marko Dugandžić (Rapid București – 22) | |
| 2023–24 | FCSB (27/28) | CFR Cluj | Universitatea Craiova | (Romania) Florinel Coman (FCSB – 18) (Nigeria) Philip Otele (CFR Cluj – 18) | |
| 2024–25 | FCSB (28/28) | CFR Cluj | Universitatea Craiova | (Romania) Louis Munteanu (CFR Cluj – 23) | |
| 2025–26 | Universitatea Craiova (5/5) | Universitatea Cluj | CFR Cluj | (Bosnia and Herzegovina) Jovo Lukić (Universitatea Cluj – 18) | |

=== Top-three finishes by club ===
Legend
| The clubs currently play in the 2026–27 Liga I. |
| The clubs currently play in the lower leagues. |
| The clubs are defunct or no longer have a senior team. |

| Club | Winners | Runners-up | Third places | Winning years | Runner-up years | Third-place years (Note: Third-place totals include only seasons with an identifiable overall third place in the national championship. The knockout national championships from 1921–22 to 1931–32, the disputed 1920–21 season, and split-group seasons without an overall third-place classification (1932–33, 1933–34 and 1937–38) are not counted as third-place finishes.) |
|---|---|---|---|---|---|---|
| FCSB | 28 | 20 | 9 | 1951, 1952, 1953, 1956, 1959–60, 1960–61, 1967–68, 1975–76, 1977–78, 1984–85, 1985–86, 1986–87, 1987–88, 1988–89, 1992–93, 1993–94, 1994–95, 1995–96, 1996–97, 1997–98, 2000–01, 2004–05, 2005–06, 2012–13, 2013–14, 2014–15, 2023–24, 2024–25 | 1954, 1957–58, 1962–63, 1976–77, 1979–80, 1983–84, 1989–90, 1990–91, 1991–92, 2002–03, 2003–04, 2006–07, 2007–08, 2015–16, 2016–17, 2017–18, 2018–19, 2020–21, 2021–22, 2022–23 | 1958–59, 1963–64, 1964–65, 1969–70, 1970–71, 1978–79, 1998–99, 1999–00, 2011–12 |
| Dinamo București | 18 | 20 | 10 | 1955, 1961–62, 1962–63, 1963–64, 1964–65, 1970–71, 1972–73, 1974–75, 1976–77, 1981–82, 1982–83, 1983–84, 1989–90, 1991–92, 1999–2000, 2001–02, 2003–04, 2006–07 | 1951, 1952, 1953, 1956, 1958–59, 1960–61, 1966–67, 1968–69, 1973–74, 1975–76, 1978–79, 1980–81, 1984–85, 1986–87, 1987–88, 1988–89, 1992–93, 1998–99, 2000–01, 2004–05 | 1954, 1965–66, 1967–68, 1990–91, 1993–94, 1994–95, 1996–97, 2005–06, 2008–09, 2016–17 |
| CFR Cluj | 8 | 2 | 4 | 2007–08, 2009–10, 2011–12, 2017–18, 2018–19, 2019–20, 2020–21, 2021–22 | 2023–24, 2024–25 | 2006–07, 2014–15, 2022–23, 2025–26 |
| Venus București | 7 | 1 | 1 | 1919–20, 1928–29, 1931–32, 1933–34, 1936–37, 1938–39, 1939–40 | 1920–21 | 1934–35 |
| UTA Arad | 6 | 1 | 1 | 1946–47, 1947–48, 1950, 1954, 1968–69, 1969–70 | 1971–72 | 1953 |
| Chinezul Timișoara | 6 | 0 | 0 | 1921–22, 1922–23, 1923–24, 1924–25, 1925–26, 1926–27 | — | — |
| Universitatea Craiova | 5 | 6 | 12 | 1973–74, 1979–80, 1980–81, 1990–91, 2025–26 | 1972–73, 1981–82, 1982–83, 1993–94, 1994–95, 2019–20 | 1966–67, 1974–75, 1976–77, 1983–84, 1985–86, 1989–90, 1992–93, 2017–18, 2020–21, 2021–22, 2023–24, 2024–25 |
| Petrolul Ploiești (Note: The 1929–30 championship and the 1935–36 third-place finish recorded by Juventus București are grouped with Petrolul Ploiești; Petrolul's official club history describes Juventus as the predecessor of the present club and the 1930 championship as its first national title.) | 4 | 3 | 4 | 1929–30, 1957–58, 1958–59, 1965–66 | 1925–26, 1955, 1961–62 | 1935–36, 1959–60, 2012–13, 2013–14 |
| Ripensia Timișoara | 4 | 2 | 2 | 1932–33, 1934–35, 1935–36, 1937–38 | 1933–34, 1938–39 | 1936–37, 1940–41 |
| Rapid București | 3 | 14 | 8 | 1966–67, 1998–99, 2002–03 | 1936–37, 1937–38, 1939–40, 1940–41, 1948–49, 1950, 1963–64, 1964–65, 1965–66, 1969–70, 1970–71, 1997–98, 1999–2000, 2005–06 | 1947–48, 1960–61, 1968–69, 1995–96, 2001–02, 2003–04, 2004–05, 2007–08 |
| Argeș Pitești | 2 | 2 | 4 | 1971–72, 1978–79 | 1967–68, 1977–78 | 1972–73, 1979–80, 1980–81, 1997–98 |
| Colentina București | 2 | 2 | 2 | 1912–13, 1913–14 | 1909–10, 1911–12 | 1910–11, 1914–15 |
| Prahova Ploiești (Note: RomanianSoccer treats United AC Ploiești as part of the historical Prahova Ploiești line and credits the club with the 1911–12 and 1915–16 championships.) | 2 | 2 | 2 | 1911–12, 1915–16 | 1910–11, 1914–15 | 1909–10, 1920–21 |
| Unirea Tricolor București | 2 | 1 | 0 | 1920–21, 1940–41 | 1919–20 | — |
| Olympia București | 2 | 0 | 1 | 1909–10, 1910–11 | — | 1911–12 |
| Farul Constanța (Note: The 2021 merger between Farul Constanța and Viitorul Constanța, and the attribution of Viitorul's honours (including the 2016–17 Liga I title) to Farul are disputed.) | 2 | 0 | 1 | 2016–17, 2022–23 | — | 2018–19 |
| Club Atletic Oradea | 1 | 2 | 1 | 1948–49 | 1923–24, 1934–35 | 1951 |
| Astra Giurgiu | 1 | 1 | 1 | 2015–16 | 2013–14 | 2019–20 |
| Colțea Brașov | 1 | 1 | 0 | 1927–28 | 1926–27 | — |
| CSM Reșița | 1 | 1 | 0 | 1930–31 | 1931–32 | — |
| Unirea Urziceni | 1 | 1 | 0 | 2008–09 | 2009–10 | — |
| Româno-Americană București | 1 | 0 | 0 | 1914–15 | — | — |
| Oțelul Galați | 1 | 0 | 0 | 2010–11 | — | — |
| Progresul București | 0 | 3 | 2 | — | 1995–96, 1996–97, 2001–02 | 1955, 1961–62 |
| Victoria Cluj | 0 | 3 | 0 | — | 1921–22, 1922–23, 1928–29 | — |
| Politehnica Timișoara | 0 | 2 | 5 | — | 2008–09, 2010–11 | 1950, 1956, 1957–58, 1962–63, 1977–78 |
| Bukarester FC | 0 | 2 | 1 | — | 1913–14, 1915–16 | 1912–13 |
| Universitatea Cluj | 0 | 2 | 1 | — | 1932–33, 2025–26 | 1971–72 |
| Sportul Studențesc București | 0 | 1 | 3 | — | 1985–86 | 1939–40, 1982–83, 1984–85 |
| FC Brașov | 0 | 1 | 2 | — | 1959–60 | 1973–74, 2000–01 |
| FC Vaslui | 0 | 1 | 2 | — | 2011–12 | 2009–10, 2010–11 |
| Cercul Atletic București | 0 | 1 | 1 | — | 1912–13 | 1913–14 |
| Vagonul Arad | 0 | 1 | 1 | — | 1935–36 | 1938–39 |
| CFR Timișoara | 0 | 1 | 1 | — | 1947–48 | 1946–47 |
| ASA Târgu Mureș | 0 | 1 | 1 | — | 1974–75 | 1975–76 |
| Jiul Petroșani | 0 | 1 | 1 | — | 1924–25 | 1948–49 |
| Pandurii Târgu Jiu | 0 | 1 | 1 | — | 2012–13 | 2015–16 |
| Minerul Lupeni | 0 | 1 | 0 | — | 1927–28 | — |
| Gloria Arad | 0 | 1 | 0 | — | 1929–30 | — |
| Societatea Gimnastică Sibiu | 0 | 1 | 0 | — | 1930–31 | — |
| Carmen București | 0 | 1 | 0 | — | 1946–47 | — |
| ASA 2013 Târgu Mureș | 0 | 1 | 0 | — | 2014–15 | — |
| Victoria București | 0 | 0 | 3 | — | — | 1986–87, 1987–88, 1988–89 |
| Colțea București | 0 | 0 | 2 | — | — | 1915–16, 1919–20 |
| CA Câmpulung Moldovenesc | 0 | 0 | 1 | — | — | 1952 |
| Corvinul Hunedoara | 0 | 0 | 1 | — | — | 1981–82 |
| Electroputere Craiova | 0 | 0 | 1 | — | — | 1991–92 |
| Gloria Bistrița | 0 | 0 | 1 | — | — | 2002–03 |

No championships were held from 1916–17 to 1918–19 because of World War I, or from 1941–42 to 1945–46 because of World War II. Third place is omitted from 1921–22 to 1931–32 because the national competition used a knockout format without an official third-place match/ranking. The 1932–33, 1933–34, and 1937–38 seasons used group formats and also did not produce an official third place.

== See also ==
- Football records in Romania
- Football in Romania
- List of football clubs in Romania by major honors won
- Romanian football league system

== Footnotes ==
A. Between 1916 and 1919 there was no competition held and no champion declared.
B. Reliable top-scorer data are not available for these editions.
C. Between 1941 and 1946 no official Romanian national championship title was awarded; wartime competitions were unofficial or incomplete.
