= List of football clubs in Romania by major honors won =

This is a List of major honours won by football clubs in Romania. It lists all the Romanian football clubs who have won a domestic or European Trophy. FCSB is the most decorated side in Romanian football, holding the record number of wins in every single internal competition, and being the only Romanian club to have obtained continental honours. (Note: Subject to legal challenge: see Steaua București football records dispute)

Note: This list does not include the UEFA Intertoto Cup which was won by Oţelul Galaţi (2007) and Vaslui (2008) as they are not classified as outright winners by UEFA having failed to have the best run in the UEFA Cup out of the teams that had won the competition in those respective seasons.

== Honours table ==
Teams in Italics no longer exist.
Teams in Bold compete in the 2026–27 Liga I season.

This table is updated as of July 2026, following U Craiova winning the 2026 Supercupa României.

	Club	League	Cup	League Cup	Super Cup	European Cup	European Super Cup	Balkans Cup	European Railways Cup	Total	Last Trophy Won
1	**FCSB**	28	23	2	8	1	1	-	-	63	2025 Super Cup
2	**Dinamo București**	18	13	1	2	-	-	-	-	34	2017 League Cup
3	**Rapid București**	3	13	1	4	-	-	2	1	24	2007 Super Cup
4	**CFR Cluj**	8	5	-	4	-	-	-	-	17	2025 Cup
5	**Universitatea Craiova**	5	9	-	2	-	-	-	-	16	2026 Super Cup
6	Venus București	8	-	-	-	-	-	-	-	8	1940 League
=	**UTA Arad**	6	2	-	-	-	-	-	-	8	1970 League
8	**Petrolul Ploiești**	4	3	-	-	-	-	-	-	7	2013 Cup
9	Chinezul Timișoara	6	-	-	-	-	-	-	-	6	1927 League
=	Ripensia Timișoara	4	2	-	-	-	-	-	-	6	1938 League
11	Astra Giurgiu	1	1	-	2	-	-	-	-	4	2016 Super Cup
=	**Sepsi Sfântu Gheorghe**	-	2	-	2	-	-	-	-	4	2023 Super Cup
13	CA Oradea	2 (Note: Includes Liga I and Nemzeti Bajnokság I.)	1	-	-	-	-	-	-	3	1956 Cup
=	Viitorul Constanța	1	1	-	1	-	-	-	-	3	2019 Super Cup
15	**Argeș Pitești**	2	-	-	-	-	-	-	-	2	1979 League
=	Colentina București	2	-	-	-	-	-	-	-	2	1914 League
=	Olympia București	2	-	-	-	-	-	-	-	2	1911 League
=	CSM Reșița	1	1	-	-	-	-	-	-	2	1954 Cup
=	**Oțelul Galați**	1	-	-	1	-	-	-	-	2	2011 Super Cup
=	Politehnica Timișoara	-	2	-	-	-	-	-	-	2	1980 Cup
=	Gloria Bistrița	-	1	1	-	-	-	-	-	2	2000 League Cup
=	**Voluntari**	-	1	-	1	-	-	-	-	2	2017 Super Cup
23	Colțea Braşov	1	-	-	-	-	-	-	-	1	1928 League
=	**Farul Constanța**	1	-	-	-	-	-	-	-	1	2023 League
=	Prahova Ploiești	1	-	-	-	-	-	-	-	1	1916 League
=	Româno-Americană București	1	-	-	-	-	-	-	-	1	1915 League
=	Unirea Urziceni	1	-	-	-	-	-	-	-	1	2009 League
=	Unirea Tricolor București	1	-	-	-	-	-	-	-	1	1941 League
=	United Ploiești	1	-	-	-	-	-	-	-	1	1912 League
=	CFR Turnu Severin	-	1	-	-	-	-	-	-	1	1943 Cup
=	Chimia Râmnicu Vâlcea	-	1	-	-	-	-	-	-	1	1973 Cup
=	**Corvinul Hunedoara**	-	1	-	-	-	-	-	-	1	2024 Cup
=	Jiul Petroșani	-	1	-	-	-	-	-	-	1	1974 Cup
=	Progresul București	-	1	-	-	-	-	-	-	1	1960 Cup
=	Sticla Arieșul Turda	-	1	-	-	-	-	-	-	1	1961 Cup
=	**Universitatea Cluj**	-	1	-	-	-	-	-	-	1	1965 Cup
=	FCM Bacău	-	-	1	-	-	-	-	-	1	1998 League Cup
=	ASA Târgu Mureș	-	-	-	1	-	-	-	-	1	2015 Super Cup
=	Brașov	-	-	-	-	-	-	1	-	1	1961 Balkans Cup
=	Inter Sibiu	-	-	-	-	-	-	1	-	1	1991 Balkans Cup
=	Sportul Studențesc București	-	-	-	-	-	-	1	-	1	1980 Balkans Cup

== See also ==
- List of football clubs by competitive honours won
- List of Romanian football champions
- Football records in Romania
