= Football records and statistics in Romania =

== League ==
Records in this section refer to Liga I from its founding in 1909 through to the present.

=== Clubs ===
==== Titles ====
- Most League titles: 28, Steaua București (1951, 1952, 1953, 1956, 1959–60, 1960–61, 1967–68, 1975–76, 1977–78, 1984–85, 1985–86, 1986–87, 1987–88, 1988–89, 1992–93, 1993–94, 1994–95, 1995–96, 1996–97, 1997–98, 2000–01, 2004–05, 2005–06, 2012–13, 2013–14, 2014–15, 2023–24, 2024–25)
- Most consecutive League titles: 6, Chinezul Timișoara (1921–22, 1922–23, 1923–24, 1924–25, 1925–26, 1926–27) and Steaua București (1992–93, 1993–94, 1994–95, 1995–96, 1996–97, 1997–98)

==== Top flight appearances ====
- Most Appearances: 72, FCSB

==== Wins ====
- Most Wins Overall: 1224, FCSB
- Most Consecutive Wins: 21, Steaua București (1988)

==== Draws ====
- Most Draws Overall: 508, FCSB
- Most Consecutive Draws: 8, FCM Bacău (1979)

==== Losses ====
- Most Losses Overall: 717, Universitatea Cluj
- Most Consecutive Losses: 24, ASA Târgu Mureş (1988)

==== Points ====
- Most Points Overall: 4180, FCSB

=== Players ===
==== Appearances ====
Top Ten Players With Most Appearances As of 15 October 2026
Player		Period	Club	Games
1	(Romania) **Dan Nistor**	2010–	Pandurii Târgu Jiu, Dinamo București, CFR Cluj, Universitatea Craiova, Universitatea Cluj	523
2	(Romania) Ionel Dănciulescu	1993–2014	Electroputere Craiova, Dinamo București, Steaua București	515
3	(Romania) Costică Ștefănescu	1968–1988	Steaua București, Universitatea Craiova, FC Brașov	490
4	(Romania) Florea Ispir	1969–1988	ASA Târgu Mureș	485
5	(Romania) László Bölöni	1971–1988	ASA Târgu Mureș, Steaua București	484
6	(Romania) Costel Câmpeanu	1987–2005	FCM Bacău, Dinamo București, Gloria Bistrița, Progresul București, Ceahlăul Piatra Neamț	470
7	(Romania) Petre Marin	1993–2012	Sportul Studențesc, Național București, Rapid București, Steaua București, Unirea Urziceni, Concordia Chiajna	468
8	(Romania) Paul Cazan	1972–1988	Sportul Studențesc	465
9	(Romania) Cornel Dinu	1966–1983	Dinamo București	454
10	(Portugal) (Romania) **Mário Camora**	2011–	CFR Cluj	453

Top Ten Foreign Players With Most Appearances As of 6 June 2026
Player		Period	Club	Games
1	(Portugal) **Mário Camora**	2011–	CFR Cluj	453
2	(Japan) **Takayuki Seto**	2009–	Astra Giurgiu, Petrolul Ploiești, Argeș Pitești	362
3	(Brazil) **Júnior Morais**	2010–	Astra Giurgiu, FCSB, Rapid București, Metaloglobus București	320
4	(Montenegro) **Risto Radunović**	2017–	Astra Giurgiu, FCSB	269
5	(Croatia) Adnan Aganović	2013–2025	FC Brașov, Viitorul Constanța, Steaua București, Sepsi OSK, Unirea Slobozia	261
6	(Portugal) Ricardinho	2018–	Voluntari, Petrolul Ploiești	243
7	(Ivory Coast) Ousmane Viera	2009–2021	CFR Cluj, Internațional Curtea de Argeș, Pandurii Târgu Jiu, Sepsi OSK, Hermannstadt	235
8	(Moldova) Vadim Rață	2021–	Voluntari, FCSB, Universitatea Cluj, Argeș Pitești	234
9	(Brazil) Eric de Oliveira	2008–2021	Gaz Metan Mediaș, Pandurii Târgu Jiu, Viitorul Constanța, Voluntari	222
10	(Bulgaria) Radoslav Dimitrov	2015–2024	Botoșani, Universitatea Craiova, Sepsi OSK, Universitatea Cluj	216

Player obtained Romanian citizenship and represented Romania internationally
Player obtained Romanian citizenship, but did not represent Romania internationally

==== Goals ====
Top Ten Highest Goalscorers As of 6 June 2026
Player		Period	Club	Goals
1	(Romania) Dudu Georgescu	1970–1987	Progresul București, CSM Reșița, Dinamo București, FCM Bacău, Gloria Buzău, Flacăra Moreni	252 (Ø 0,68)
2	(Romania) Ionel Dănciulescu	1993–2014	Electroputere Craiova, Dinamo București, Steaua București	214 (Ø 0,41)
3	(Romania) Rodion Cămătaru	1974–1989	Universitatea Craiova, Dinamo București	198 (Ø 0,52)
4	(Romania) Marin Radu	1974–1989	Argeș Pitești, Olt Scornicești, Steaua București, Inter Sibiu	190 (Ø 0,49)
5	(Romania) Ion Oblemenco	1963–1977	Rapid București, Universitatea Craiova	170 (Ø 0,62)
5	(Romania) Florea Dumitrache	1966–1983	Dinamo București, Jiul Petroșani, Corvinul Hunedoara	170 (Ø 0,47)
7	(Romania) Mircea Sandu	1970–1987	Progresul București, Sportul Studențesc	167 (Ø 0,41)
8	(Romania) Victor Pițurcă	1975–1989	Universitatea Craiova, Olt Scornicești, Steaua București	166 (Ø 0,55)
9	(Romania) Mihai Adam	1962–1976	Universitatea Cluj, Vagonul Arad, CFR Cluj	160 (Ø 0,45)
10	(Romania) Titus Ozon	1947–1964	Unirea Tricolor, Dinamo București, Dinamo Brașov, Progresul București, Rapid București	157 (Ø 0,58)

Top Ten Highest Foreign Players Goalscorers As of 6 June 2026
Player		Period	Club	Goals
1	(Brazil) Eric de Oliveira	2008–2021	Gaz Metan Mediaș, Pandurii Târgu Jiu, Viitorul Constanța, Voluntari	66 (Ø 0,29)
2	(Brazil) Wesley	2008–2015	Vaslui, Politehnica Iași	64 (Ø 0,52)
3	(France) Harlem Gnohéré	2015–2020	Dinamo București, FCSB	58 (Ø 0,42)
4	(Bosnia and Herzegovina) Bojan Golubović	2011–2018	Ceahlăul Piatra Neamț, Politehnica Iași, Steaua București, Gaz Metan Mediaș, Botoșani	55 (Ø 0,27)
5	(Greece) Pantelis Kapetanos	2008–2014	FCSB, CFR Cluj	48 (Ø 0,38)
6	(Croatia) Gabriel Debeljuh	2019–2026	Hermannstadt, CFR Cluj, Sepsi OSK	47 (Ø 0,29)
6	(Bosnia and Herzegovina) Elvir Koljić	2018–2026	Universitatea Craiova, Rapid București	47 (Ø 0,25)
6	(Slovakia) Adam Nemec	2016–2024	Dinamo București, Voluntari	47 (Ø 0,24)
9	(Nigeria) **Kehinde Fatai**	2007–2024	Farul Constanța, Astra Giurgiu, Argeș Pitești, Oțelul Galați	46 (Ø 0,25)
10	(Jordan) Tha'er Bawab	2010–2019	Gloria Bistrița, Gaz Metan Mediaș, Universitatea Craiova, Steaua București, Dinamo București, Concordia Chiajna	42 (Ø 0,20)

Player obtained Romanian citizenship, but did not represent Romania internationally

Top Ten Youngest Debutants As of 6 June 2026. The teams written in bold are the ones the players debuted at
Player		Age	Match	Season	Date
1	(Romania) Nicolae Dobrin	14 years, 10 months and 5 days	Știința Cluj - **Dinamo Pitești** 5–1	1961–62	1 July 1962
2	(Romania) Alexandru Stoian	14 years, 10 months and 13 days	FC U Craiova - **Farul Constanța** 1–2	2022–23	28 October 2022
3	(Romania) Alexandru Bota	14 years, 11 months and 13 days	CFR Cluj - **Universitatea Cluj** 4–0	2022–23	13 March 2023
4	(Romania) Rareș Lazăr	15 years, one month and 19 days	Ceahlăul Piatra Neamț - **FC Vaslui** 2–0	2013–14	17 May 2014
5	(Romania) Răzvan Popa	15 years, 2 months and 13 days	Dinamo București - **Sportul Studențesc** 1–3	2011–12	17 March 2012
6	(Romania) Codrin Epure	15 years, 2 months and 21 days	**FC Vaslui** - Astra Giurgiu 1–4	2013–14	19 May 2014
7	(Romania) Vasile Chitaru	15 years, 4 months and 14 days	**SC Bacău** - Jiul Petroșani 3–0	1973–74	19 May 1974
8	(Romania) Ștefan Harsanyi	15 years, 4 months and 22 days	**Bihor Oradea** - Sportul Studențesc 2–0	1982–83	2 July 1983
9	(Romania) Dorel Zamfir	15 years, 5 months and 16 days	**FC Constanța** - Steaua București 0–1	1976–77	16 March 1977
10	(Romania) Enes Sali	15 years, 5 months and 17 days	**Farul Constanța** - Sepsi OSK 1–0	2021–22	9 August 2021

=== Managers ===
Top Ten Managers With Most Appearances As of 6 June 2026
Manager		Period	Matches	Victories	Draws	Losses	Victory percentage
1	(Romania) Florin Halagian	1972–2011	878	432	176	270	59%
2	(Romania) Ilie Oană	1952–1979	572	232	124	216	51%
3	(Romania) Nicolae Dumitru	1962–1993	558	250	120	188	55%
4	(Romania) Ion V. Ionescu	1967–1994	496	194	89	213	48%
5	(Romania) Viorel Hizo	1990–2013	488	221	85	182	53%
6	(Romania) Ioan Andone	1994–2017	456	207	80	169	54%
7	(Romania) Florin Marin	1993–2017	456	166	103	187	47%
8	(Romania) Valentin Stănescu	1962–1984	455	206	101	148	56%
9	(Romania) Sorin Cârțu	1989–2013	454	175	114	165	51%
10	(Romania) Angelo Niculescu	1953–1982	445	196	101	148	55%

=== Referees ===
Top Ten Referees With Most Appearances As of 6 June 2026
Referee		Period	Matches
1	(Romania) **Sebastian Colțescu**	2003–2026	423
2	(Romania) **István Kovács**	2008–	382
3	(Romania) Alexandru Tudor	1999–2018	381
4	(Romania) Cristian Balaj	2000–2016	341
5	(Romania) **Radu Petrescu**	2007–	310
6	(Romania) Ovidiu Hațegan	2006–2024	308
7	(Romania) Sorin Corpodean	1997–2009	268
8	(Romania) Nicolae Rainea	1964–1984	267
9	(Romania) **Marcel Bîrsan**	2012–	261
10	(Romania) Marius Avram	2007–2020	246

== Most successful clubs overall (official titles, 1909–present) ==
Teams in Italics no longer exist.
Teams in Bold compete in the 2025–26 Liga I season.

This table is updated as of 17th of May 2026, following U Craiova winning the 2025-26 Liga I.

	Club	League	Cup	League Cup	Super Cup	European Cup	European Super Cup	Total	Last Trophy Won
1	**FCSB**	28	23	2	8	1	1	63	2025 Supercup
2	**Dinamo București**	18	13	1	2	-	-	34	2017 League Cup
3	**Rapid București**	3	13	-	4	-	-	20	2007 Super Cup
4	**CFR Cluj**	8	5	-	4	-	-	17	2024-25 Cupa României
5	**Universitatea Craiova**	5	9	-	2	-	-	16	2026 League
6	**UTA Arad**	6	2	-	-	-	-	8	1970 League
=	Venus București	7	-	-	-	-	-	7	1940 League
8	**Petrolul Ploiești**	4	3	-	-	-	-	7	2013 Cup
9	Chinezul Timișoara	6	-	-	-	-	-	6	1927 League
=	Ripensia Timișoara	4	2	-	-	-	-	6	1938 League
11	Astra Giurgiu	1	1	-	2	-	-	4	2016 Super Cup
=	Sepsi Sfântu Gheorghe	-	2	-	2	-	-	4	2023 Super Cup
13	Viitorul Constanța	1	1	-	1	-	-	3	2019 Super Cup
14	**Argeș Pitești**	2	-	-	-	-	-	2	1979 League
=	CA Oradea	1	1	-	-	-	-	2	1956 Cup
=	Colentina București	2	-	-	-	-	-	2	1914 League
=	CSM Reșița	1	1	-	-	-	-	2	1954 Cup
=	Olympia București	2	-	-	-	-	-	2	1911 League
=	**Oțelul Galați**	1	-	-	1	-	-	2	2011 Super Cup
=	Politehnica Timișoara	-	2	-	-	-	-	2	1980 Cup
=	Voluntari	-	1	-	1	-	-	2	2017 Super Cup
22	Arieșul Turda	-	1	-	-	-	-	1	1961 Cup
=	ASA Târgu Mureș	-	-	-	1	-	-	1	2015 Super Cup
=	CFR Turnu Severin	-	1	-	-	-	-	1	1943 Cup
=	Chimia Râmnicu Vâlcea	-	1	-	-	-	-	1	1973 Cup
=	Colțea Braşov	1	-	-	-	-	-	1	1928 League
=	**Farul Constanța**	1	-	-	-	-	-	1	2023 League
=	Gloria Bistrița	-	1	-	-	-	-	1	1994 Cup
=	Jiul Petroșani	-	1	-	-	-	-	1	1974 Cup
=	Prahova Ploiești	1	-	-	-	-	-	1	1916 League
=	Progresul București	-	1	-	-	-	-	1	1960 Cup
=	Româno-Americană București	1	-	-	-	-	-	1	1915 League
=	Unirea Urziceni	1	-	-	-	-	-	1	2009 League
=	United Ploiești	1	-	-	-	-	-	1	1912 League
=	**Universitatea Cluj**	-	1	-	-	-	-	1	1965 Cup
=	Corvinul Hunedoara	-	1	-	-	-	-	1	2024 Cup

== All-time table ==
The ranking is computed awarding three points for a win, one for a draw. It includes matches played between the 1932–33 and 2025–26 season including. The teams in bold play in the 2026–27 season of Liga I.

This table lists only league finishes since 1932–33, when a national league was first introduced. Since an official national championship has been awarded since 1909, some teams are not listed with all their championships. For example, Venus București have been champions seven times, but are listed only with the four titles they won since 1932.

League or status at 2026–27:

2026–27 Liga I
2026–27 Liga II
2026–27 Liga III
2026–27 County football leagues
Clubs that no longer exist

Pos	Team	S	Pts	GP	W	D	L	GF	GA	1st	2nd	3rd	4th	5th	6th	T	Debut	Since/ Last App	Best
1	**FCSB**	78	4691	2464	1369	584	521	4574	2449	28	20	9	4	6	6	73	1947	1947–48	1
2	**Dinamo București**	77	4287	2400	1248	543	609	4361	2660	18	20	10	5	5	7	65	1948	2023–24	1
3	**Rapid București**	71	3302	2097	933	503	661	3226	2478	3	14	8	9	7	1	42	1932	2021–22	1
4	**Petrolul Ploiești**	62	2471	1823	679	434	710	2420	2390	4	2	4	2	6	4	21	1933	2022–23	1
5	**Universitatea Craiova**	40	2254	1357	652	298	408	2055	1430	5	4	11	6	5	3	34	1964	2014–15	1
6	**Universitatea Cluj**	60	2237	1766	618	383	765	2269	2650	0	2	1	5	3	2	13	1932	2022–23	2
7	**Argeș Pitești**	48	2185	1562	624	313	625	1994	1983	2	2	4	3	3	4	18	1961	2025–26	1
8	Politehnica Timișoara	48	2003	1490	545	368	577	1919	2061	0	2	5	1	4	6	18	1948	2010–11	2
9	**Farul Constanța**	47	1968	1497	551	315	632	1844	2071	1	0	0	4	3	2	10	1955	2021–22	1
10	FC Brașov	46	1912	1429	533	313	583	1765	1845	0	1	2	3	4	2	12	1957	2014–15	2
11	**CFR Cluj**	30	1775	1064	494	293	277	1496	1115	8	2	3	2	3	0	18	1947	2004–05	1
12	**UTA Arad**	43	1772	1267	489	305	473	1810	1744	6	1	1	3	3	1	15	1946	2020–21	1
13	FCM Bacău	42	1729	1319	489	262	568	1538	1809	0	0	0	1	4	6	11	1956	2005–06	4
14	Sportul Studențesc	36	1561	1154	435	256	463	1569	1575	0	1	3	6	2	4	16	1937	2011–12	2
15	Politehnica Iași	38	1511	1262	409	284	569	1410	1775	0	0	0	0	0	2	2	1960	2023–24	6
16	Jiul Petroșani	41	1456	1197	402	250	545	1403	1845	0	0	1	0	2	2	5	1937	2006–07	3
17	**Oțelul Galați**	30	1422	1011	401	219	391	1231	1242	1	0	0	3	3	2	9	1986	2023–24	1
18	Progresul București	32	1326	945	379	189	377	1353	1324	0	3	2	3	1	2	11	1955	2006–07	2
19	FC U Craiova	21	962	704	265	167	272	953	895	0	2	1	2	0	0	5	1991	2021–22	2
20	Gloria Bistrița	22	940	724	269	133	322	903	1003	0	0	1	0	2	4	7	1990	2012–13	3
21	Astra Giurgiu	17	891	618	242	165	211	812	699	1	1	2	2	2	1	9	1998	2020–21	1
22	ASA Târgu Mureș	21	862	690	251	109	330	817	1025	0	1	1	2	0	1	5	1967	1991–92	2
23	Ceahlăul Piatra Neamț	18	740	596	202	134	260	689	851	0	0	0	1	2	1	4	1993	2014–15	4
24	**Corvinul Hunedoara**	17	728	562	210	98	254	831	881	0	0	1	0	1	2	4	1954	2026–27	3
25	Bihor Oradea	18	661	572	181	118	273	683	893	0	0	0	0	0	0	0	1963	2003–04	7
26	Gaz Metan Mediaș	16	645	558	161	162	235	597	791	0	0	0	0	0	1	1	1947	2021–22	6
27	**FC Botoșani**	12	614	460	160	134	166	546	560	0	0	0	1	0	1	2	2013	2013–14	4
28	CSM Reșița	16	565	482	154	103	225	666	890	0	0	0	2	0	1	3	1938	1999–00	4
29	Pandurii Târgu Jiu	12	532	412	140	112	160	459	491	0	1	1	0	0	0	2	2005	2016–17	2
30	Club Atletic Oradea	17	515	378	145	80	153	633	635	1	1	1	1	0	3	7	1932	1962–63	1
31	FC Vaslui	9	489	302	137	78	87	393	303	0	1	2	0	2	1	6	2005	2013–14	2
32	Olt Scornicești	11	475	373	137	64	172	424	546	0	0	0	1	0	0	1	1979	1989–90	4
33	Viitorul Constanța	9	465	325	125	90	110	437	398	1	0	1	1	1	0	4	2012	2020–21	1
34	Unirea Tricolor București (Dinamo B, Dinamo C)	16	462	347	128	78	141	625	669	1	0	0	1	0	0	2	1932	1957–58	1
35	Chimia Râmnicu Vâlcea	10	427	340	121	64	155	368	533	0	0	0	0	0	0	0	1974	1986–87	8
36	CFR Timișoara	11	382	273	104	70	99	406	392	0	1	1	2	1	0	5	1946	1970–71	2
37	Inter Sibiu	8	377	272	110	47	115	358	376	0	0	0	1	0	1	2	1988	1995–96	4
38	**FC Voluntari**	8	356	318	89	89	140	337	434	0	0	0	1	0	0	1	2015	2026–27	4
39	**Sepsi Sfântu Gheorghe**	7	355	273	90	85	98	335	320	0	0	0	1	1	1	3	2017	2026–27	4
40	Venus București	9	353	178	106	35	37	491	243	4	0	1	1	1	0	7	1932	1940–41	1
41	FCM Târgoviște	9	349	298	95	64	139	312	469	0	0	0	0	0	0	0	1961	1997–98	7
42	Ripensia Timișoara	9	348	178	107	27	44	498	266	4	2	2	0	0	1	9	1932	1940–41	1
43	Concordia Chiajna	8	314	296	77	83	136	299	423	0	0	0	0	0	0	0	2011	2018–19	9
44	CS Târgu Mureș	10	301	241	85	46	110	360	418	0	0	0	2	0	0	2	1946	1957–58	4
45	Minaur Baia Mare	7	284	230	83	35	112	267	370	0	0	0	1	1	0	2	1964	1994–95	4
46	FC Hermannstadt	6	275	234	67	74	93	253	295	0	0	0	0	0	0	0	2018	2022–23	7
47	Unirea Urziceni	5	269	170	74	47	49	199	162	1	1	0	0	1	0	3	2006	2010–11	1
48	FC Gloria Buzău	8	264	277	71	51	155	265	468	0	0	0	0	1	0	1	1978	2024–25	5
49	Vagonul Arad	9	259	184	76	31	77	318	326	0	1	1	1	0	0	3	1932	1968–69	2
50	Olimpia Satu Mare	7	247	222	69	40	113	223	363	0	0	0	0	0	0	0	1937	1998–99	9
51	Victoria București	5	243	169	70	33	66	242	251	0	0	3	0	0	0	3	1985	1989–90	3
52	ASA 2013 Târgu Mureș	5	218	178	55	53	70	179	213	0	1	0	0	0	1	2	2010	2016–17	2
53	Gloria Arad	8	208	155	59	31	66	296	332	0	0	0	0	0	1	1	1932	1940–41	3
54	Victoria Cluj	8	206	154	61	23	70	266	294	0	0	0	0	1	2	3	1932	1939–40	3
55	Extensiv Craiova (Electroputere)	5	198	170	54	36	80	171	213	0	0	1	0	0	1	2	1991	1999–00	3
56	Dacia Unirea Brăila	6	192	177	54	30	94	193	328	0	0	0	0	0	1	1	1937	1993–94	6
57	Flacăra Moreni	4	182	136	53	23	60	180	198	0	0	0	1	0	1	2	1986	1989–90	4
58	Dunărea Galați	5	164	170	44	32	94	174	310	0	0	0	0	0	0	0	1974	1983–84	14
59	Chinezul Timișoara	6	159	119	46	21	53	281	288	0	0	0	0	1	0	1	1933	1938–39	4
60	Crișana Oradea	6	140	110	40	20	50	199	232	0	0	0	0	0	0	0	1932	1937–38	2
61	Chindia Târgoviște	3	133	116	33	34	49	100	124	0	0	0	0	0	0	0	2019	2022–23	7
62	Academica Clinceni	3	112	119	27	31	61	109	205	0	0	0	0	1	0	1	2019	2021–22	5
63	Minerul Lupeni	4	105	101	30	15	56	106	207	0	0	0	0	0	0	0	1959	1962–63	11
64	FC Ploiești (Tricolor Ploiești)	5	100	102	28	16	58	131	254	0	0	0	0	0	0	0	1932	1947–48	5
65	Foresta Fălticeni (Foresta Suceava)	3	99	98	24	27	47	102	145	0	0	0	0	0	0	0	1997	2000–01	13
66	Unirea Alba Iulia	3	93	94	24	21	49	93	171	0	0	0	0	0	1	1	2003	2009–10	6
67	Phoenix Baia Mare	3	89	62	26	11	25	96	106	0	0	0	0	0	0	0	1937	1939–40	5
68	CS Mioveni	3	88	107	20	28	59	77	166	0	0	0	0	0	0	0	2007	2022–23	12
69	Maccabi București (Ciocanul București)	2	82	56	24	10	22	100	87	0	0	0	0	0	0	0	1946	1947–48	7
70	Rocar București	2	81	64	25	6	33	93	108	0	0	0	0	0	0	0	1999	2000–01	12
71	Unirea Slobozia	2	74	78	19	17	42	77	114	0	0	0	0	0	0	0	2004	2024–25	14
72	FC Onești	2	69	68	21	6	41	93	159	0	0	0	0	0	0	0	1998	1999–00	14
73	CA Câmpulung Moldovenesc	2	55	33	15	10	8	50	31	0	0	1	0	0	0	1	1952	1953	3
74	Siderurgistul Galați	2	49	52	13	10	29	62	104	0	0	0	0	0	0	0	1963	1965–66	14
75	**Csíkszereda Miercurea Ciuc**	1	49	39	13	10	16	41	66	0	0	0	0	0	0	0	1904	2025–26	11
76	Carmen București	1	47	26	14	5	7	90	44	0	1	0	0	0	0	1	1946	1946–47	2
77	Gloria CFR Galați	2	46	46	13	7	26	54	100	0	0	0	0	0	0	0	1939	1940–41	10
78	Ferar Cluj	1	43	26	13	4	9	44	29	0	0	0	0	0	1	1	1946	1946–47	6
79	CAM Timișoara	2	43	34	12	7	15	54	76	0	0	0	0	1	0	1	1932	1939–40	5
80	Industria Sârmei Câmpia Turzii	2	40	48	7	19	22	46	86	0	0	0	0	0	0	0	1952	1954	12
81	Săgeata Năvodari	1	38	34	10	8	16	32	54	0	0	0	0	0	0	0	2013	2013–14	17
82	Dunărea Călărași	1	37	40	7	16	17	24	43	0	0	0	0	0	0	0	2018	2018–19	13
83	Aurul Brad	1	36	24	12	0	12	51	43	0	0	0	0	1	0	1	1940	1940–41	5
84	Internațional Curtea de Argeș	1	36	34	10	6	18	32	49	0	0	0	0	0	0	0	2009	2009–10	12
85	Bucovina Suceava	1	35	34	10	5	19	36	69	0	0	0	0	0	0	0	1987	1987–88	18
86	FC Craiova	2	35	50	10	5	35	61	171	0	0	0	0	0	0	0	1940	1946–47	9
87	CS Turnu Severin	1	32	34	7	11	16	36	47	0	0	0	0	0	0	0	2012	2012–13	16
88	Dermata Cluj	1	32	30	7	11	12	41	50	0	0	0	0	0	0	0	1947	1947–48	11
89	Voința Sibiu	1	32	34	8	8	18	24	45	0	0	0	0	0	0	0	2011	2011–12	16
90	Șoimii Sibiu	3	27	48	5	12	31	42	131	0	0	0	0	0	0	0	1932	1950	7
91	Victoria Brănești	1	25	34	5	10	19	35	61	0	0	0	0	0	0	0	2010	2010–11	16
92	Metaloglobus București	1	22	39	4	10	25	35	80	0	0	0	0	0	0	0	1936	2025–26	16
93	CS Otopeni	1	22	34	5	7	22	32	54	0	0	0	0	0	0	0	2008	2008–09	17
94	Daco-Getica București	1	22	40	4	10	26	21	72	0	0	0	0	0	0	0	2017	2017–18	14
95	Viitorul București	1	21	14	6	3	5	33	26	0	0	0	0	0	0	0	1962	1962–63	14
96	CSM Lugoj	1	20	18	6	2	10	24	41	0	0	0	0	0	0	0	1937	1937–38	7
97	Faur București	1	19	26	5	4	17	50	80	0	0	0	0	0	0	0	1948	1948–49	13
98	Prahova Ploiești	1	16	26	5	1	20	26	97	0	0	0	0	0	0	0	1946	1946–47	13
99	UM Timișoara	1	15	30	3	6	21	24	71	0	0	0	0	0	0	0	2001	2001–02	16
100	CFR Brașov	1	15	18	4	3	11	26	45	0	0	0	0	0	0	0	1937	1937–38	9
101	Corona Brașov	1	14	34	2	8	24	20	69	0	0	0	0	0	0	0	2013	2013–14	18
102	Dragoș Vodă Cernăuți	1	12	18	4	0	14	26	57	0	0	0	0	0	0	0	1937	1937–38	10
103	Avântul Reghin	1	12	24	3	3	18	19	57	0	0	0	0	0	0	0	1955	1955	13
104	Brașovia Brașov	2	6	26	1	3	22	28	85	0	0	0	0	0	0	0	1932	1933–34	7
105	Mureșul Târgu Mureș	1	4	14	1	1	12	17	56	0	0	0	0	0	0	0	1933	1933–34	7

== See also ==
- List of Romanian football champions
- List of football clubs in Romania by major honors won
