= Marian Mihail =

Romanian football manager (born 1958)

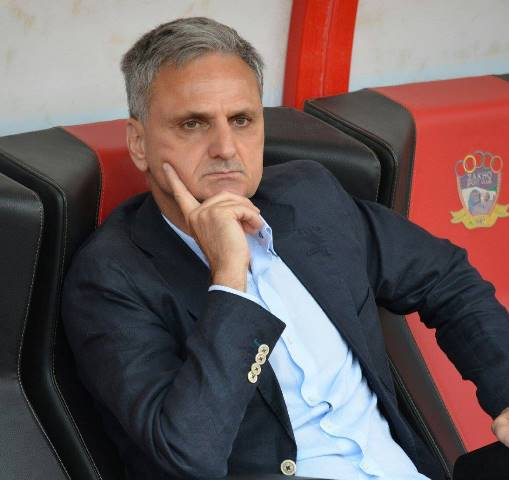

Personal information
- Full name: Marian Cucchiaroni Mihail
- Date of birth: 7 May 1958 (age 68)
- Place of birth: Brasov, Romania
- Position: Right-back

Youth career
- 1969–1975: Brasov

Senior career*
Years	Team	Apps	(Gls)
1975–1976	Brasov	24	(8)
1976–1992	Sportul Studentesc Bucharest	385	(6)
Total		409	(14)

International career
1979–1980	Romania U21	2	(0)
1983–1987	Romania U23	11	(0)
1982–1986	Romania	5	(0)

Managerial career
- 1996–1997: Sportul Studentesc Bucharest
- 1997: Brasov
- 1997–1998: Bacau
- 1998–1999: Sportul Studentesc Bucharest
- 2001–2002: Rocar Bucharest
- 2002–2003: Al-Qardaha
- 2003–2004: Al-Riyadh
- 2005: Sibiu
- 2006–2007: Al-Jaish
- 2007–2008: Sportul Studențesc
- 2008–2009: Al-Jahra
- 2008–2009: Al-Wahda Abu Dhabi (Technical Director)
- 2011–2014: Romania (National Technical Director)
- 2016–2017: Zakho
- 2017–2018: Thanh Hóa
- 2023: PSS Sleman
- 2024: United City
- 2024–2025: Maharlika Manila
- 2026: PSBS Biak
- 2026–: Sohar
- * Club domestic league appearances and goals

Marian Cucchiaroni Mihail (Romanian pronunciation: [maˈrian ˈkuk:iaˈro:ni miˈhajl]; born 7 May 1958) is a Romanian professional football manager and former player who is the head coach of Oman Professional League club Sohar SC.
An attack-minded right-back, Mihail spent almost his entire 17-year professional career in the top flight of Romanian football with Sportul Studentesc Bucharest. He also represented Romania internationally at both Under-21 and Under-23 levels before earning five senior caps.
After retiring as a player, Mihail moved into professional coaching and technical management, working for top-tier clubs in Romania, Syria, Kuwait, Saudi Arabia, the United Arab Emirates, Iraq, Vietnam, the Philippines, Indonesia and Oman. He also served as national technical director of the Romanian Football Federation (FRF) from 2011 to 2014.

== Club career ==
Mihail began his senior career in 1975, at the age of 17, playing as a winger for his hometown club Brasov FC, in the second tier of Romanian football, making 24 appearances and scoring 8 goals. The following season he moved to Sportul Studentesc Bucharest, where he spent 16 successive years of Romanian top flight football, playing over 400 league games and scoring 6 goals. Mihail made his competitive debut for Sportul Studentesc Bucharest on 20 October 1976, aged just 18, in the first leg of their 1976–77 UEFA Cup second round against German side Schalke 04. It was in the early 1980s that he was converted from a winger to an attacking full-back. During his time at Sportul Studentesc Bucharest, Mihail was a Romanian FA Cup finalist in the 1978–79 season and a Romanian League runner-up in the 1985–86 season. He also played 16 European games for the club from 1976 to 1987.

== International career ==
Mihail made five appearances for the Romania national team. His debut was a 4-1 friendly loss away to Belgium at Heysel Stadium, in Brussels, on 14 March 1982. Mihail was also part of the Romania national team squad for the successful UEFA Euro 1984 qualifying campaign, but he was not selected for the final tournament held in France.

== Managerial career ==
Mihail began his coaching career in June 1996 as manager of his former club Sportul Studentesc Bucharest, in Romania's top tier. He then managed other two Romanian top flight sides, Brasov FC and Bacau FC, before returning to Sportul Studentesc Bucharest in June 1998 for his second spell as manager of the club, relegated from Romania's top tier.

In October 1999, Mihail was appointed as director of football at Romanian giants Steaua Bucharest, Romania's most successful football club and former winners of the UEFA Champions League. In this role, he was responsible for the first team's player recruitment and tactical scouting, the youth academy and reserves, medical and sports science, and the player loan department. During his tenure, the club won two major trophies, the Romanian League title and the Romanian Super Cup, in the 2000–01 season.

In June 2002, after a stint as manager of Romanian second-tier side Rocar Bucharest, Mihail moved to the Middle East, where he had successful spells in the top flight football, first in Syria with Al-Qardaha SC, and then in Saudi Arabia with Al-Riyadh SC.

In June 2004, Mihail returned home to complete his UEFA Pro Licence with the Romania Football Federation (FRF). During that period, he was employed by the Romania Football Federation (FRF) as youth technical adviser, and also helped them to set up the Romanian national youth program. In 2005, he also had a brief stint as manager of Romanian second-tier side Sibiu.

In May 2006, Mihail moved back to the Middle East, where he signed a two-year contract with the Syrian giants Al-Jaish Damascus. His first competitive match in charge was a 1-3 loss away to Enppi Cairo in the 2006-07 Arab Champions League.

In June 2008, Mihail was appointed as manager of Kuwaiti top flight side Al-Jahra SC, on a one-year contract. In between, Mihail returned home to Romania for his third spell as manager of Sportul Studentesc Bucharest, in Romania's second tier. On 12 May 2009, at a ceremony marking the centenary of the Romania Football Federation (FRF), Mihail received the Order of Merit for services to Romanian football.

In June 2009, Mihail signed a two-year contract as technical director of Al-Wahda Abu Dhabi FC, one of the most prestigious club in the UAE, where he was responsible for the club's youth academy. Mihail's primary focus was to develop a strong academy set up and ensure that all the Al-Wahda youth teams play the same style. Under his stewardship the academy won two national titles at both U-17s and U-19s youth levels in the 2009-10 season.

In August 2011, Mihail was appointed as National Technical Director of the Romania Football Federation (FRF) and coordinator of all youth national teams, on a three-year contract. The position was new within the Romania Football Federation (FRF) at the time and included responsibility for the overall development and direction of football in Romania. Mihail's main task was to restore the competitiveness of Romanian football. After becoming familiar with the situation in Romanian football and many analyses and consultations, both within the football family and with external partners, Mihail presented his strategic plan to stop the decline of Romanian football and to achieve new success at all levels of competition. Priority was given to improve the quality of youth coaches, the performance of the national youth teams and to develop strong partnerships with the Royal Spanish Football Federation (RFEF) to promote new technical standards across the country. In only three years the new performance strategy has laid a solid base for the future development of football in Romania. This has included reforming the coach education system, revamping the format of the youth leagues and the success of the national youth teams program, both boys and girls, among other healthy developments. In February 2014, just a few days before the election of a new president for the Romania Football Federation (FRF), it was announced that Mihail officially quit his post.

In September 2016, Mihail moved back into club coaching as manager of Iraqi top flight side Zakho SC, on a one-year contract. His first league game in charge was on 26 October 2016 when Zakho faced away Naft Al-Wasat SC, the best team in the league at the time, with the match ending in a 0–0 draw. In January 2017, Mihail announced his decision to leave Zakho SC due to sectarian unrest in the country, and he was replaced with his fellow countryman Dorinel Munteanu, with whom he shares a similar coaching pedigree.

In December 2017, Mihail was named the new manager of Vietnamese top flight side FLC Thanh Hóa, replacing Ljubomir "Lupko" Petrović of Serbia. His first competitive match as manager of the team was on 23 January 2018, when FLC Thanh Hóa defeated hosts Eastern AA of Hong Kong 4-2 in the second qualifying round of the 2018 AFC Champions League. In the next round, they were eliminated from the competition by the South Korean giants and two-time Asian Champions League winners Suwon Samsung Bluewings, in an away match played at the Suwon World Cup Stadium, South Korea on 30 January 2018. The Vietnamese club then took part in the 2018 AFC Cup, Asia's secondary club football tournament, where they joined Bali United from Indonesia, Yangon United from Myanmar and Global Cebu from Philippines in Group G. Their first game was a 1-0 home win against Global Cebu on 10 February 2018. After failing to reach the knockout stage of the 2018 AFC Cup, Mihail left the club by mutual consent in April 2018.

Following a period as a football pundit on television and a lecturer at the Romanian FA Coaching School (SFA) during the pandemic, Mihail returned to coaching on 27 April 2023, signining a one-year contract as manager of Indonesian top flight side PSS Sleman. Under Mihail's guidance, PSS Sleman made a good start to the 2023-24 BRI Liga 1 season with a 1-0 win away to Bali United, the representative of Indonesia at the 2023-24 AFC Champions League, followed by a 2-2 draw at home with neighbors and rivals Persis Solo.

In February 2024, Mihail signed a one-and-a-half-year contract as manager of United City FC (formerly Ceres-Negros), the most successful club in Filipino football, with four consecutive titles. His first competitive game in charge was a 2-0 loss to the current champions Kaya FC-Iloilo on the opening day of the season, followed by a 3-1 win against Army FC. A few months later, United City FC has officially announced their withdrawal from the 2024-25 Philippines Football League season due to financial issues, and all players were released from their contracts immediately.

In August 2024, Mihail signed a one-year contract with the Philippines top-tier club Maharlika Manila FC as their new head coach. In February 2025, Mihail officially parted ways with the club after the Taiwan-based organization F.C. Vikings fully acquired the Filipino club by January 2025 and the ownership changed.

In February 2026, Mihail returned to the Indonesian top-tier by signing a contract as head coach of struggling club PSBS Biak. His first competitive game in charge was a 1-1 draw away against their rivals, Persis Solo.

In October 2026, Mihail was appointed head coach of Omani top-flight side Sohar SC, on a one-year contract.
