= Bukarester FC =

- Full name: Bukarester FC
- Founded: 1912
- Dissolved: 1916
- Ground: "Bolta Rece"
Home colours	Away colours

Bukarester FC was a football club from Bucharest, Romania. It represented the local German community from Bucharest at the round of the 20th century, with most of the players being ethnic Germans.

== History ==
Bukarester FC (German: Bucharester FC) was the third club of Bucharest founded in 1912, after Olympia București and Colentina București. They played in Divizia A for 4 years before the start of World War I.

Most players were Germans, employees of different industries, working in Bucharest. On March 18, 1912, they played the first match with Olympia București lost 4–2.

The main sponsor of the team since 1914 was IHC (International Harwester Company). The first president of the club was Cyril Hense Senior. With the beginning of World War I foreign players left the country, and the team gradually disbanded. They were still active until 1916 when they completely disappeared.

They used same stadium as rivals Colțea București, a ground located in "Bolta Rece", the current Stadionul Arcul de Triumf, next to Arcul de Triumf and next to Herăstrău Park.

== Divizia A History ==
Season	League	Pos.	Played	W	D	L	GS	GA	Points	Notes	Ref
1912–13	Divizia A	3	6	2	1	3	13	16	5p	First Edition in Romanian First League	
1913–14	Divizia A	2	2	–	1	1	1	3	1p	Fewest Points	
1914–15	Divizia A	3	10	5	1	4	15	15	11p	Highest Number of Points	
1915–16	Divizia A	2	6	2	2	1	11	8	8p	Two Points behind the Winner – Prahova Ploiești	

== Honours ==
- Runners-up (2): 1913–14, 1915–16
- Third Place (2): 1912–13, 1914–15

== See also ==
- Regat Germans

== Books ==
- Istoria Fotbalului Românesc, vol. I, 1909–1944.
- Fotbal de la A la Z (1984) – Editura Sport-Turism – autori Mihai Ionescu, Mircea Tudoran.
- Enciclopedia Educaţiei fizice şi sportului din România, vol. III București, Editura Aramis, 2002.
