= Cercul Atletic București =

Defunct Romanian football club from Bucharest

- Full name: Cercul Atletic București
- Short name: C.A.B.
- Founded: 1912
- Dissolved: 1915
- Ground: Kiseleff Road ground Șoseaua Kiseleff, Bucharest
- League: Romanian Football Championship

Cercul Atletic București (C.A.B.) was a Romanian association football club based in Bucharest. Founded in 1912, it was one of the clubs that competed in the early Romanian Football Championship before the First World War. The club finished runners-up in 1912–13 and third in 1913–14.

== History ==
Cercul Atletic București was formed in the summer of 1912. According to Romanian football historian Gheorghe Balint, the team was created from players who had previously represented other clubs in Bucharest. The new club established a football ground at the third roundabout on Șoseaua Kiseleff, opposite the site of the present-day Arcul de Triumf.

C.A.B. was immediately admitted to the first category of the Romanian championship. In its first national season, 1912–13, the club finished as runners-up behind Colentina București.

In 1913–14, Cercul Atletic competed against Colentina București and Bukarester FC. Colentina won the championship, Bukarester finished second and Cercul Atletic placed third. This was C.A.B.'s final season in the Romanian national championship.

The football section ceased activity in 1915. The wider Cercul Atletic sporting organisation, however, continued to be involved in other sports after the disappearance of the football team. In 1922, the club organised an officially authorised national ice-skating competition in Bucharest and was involved in the early development of ice hockey in Romania.

== Ground ==
Cercul Atletic played at a ground situated at the third roundabout on Șoseaua Kiseleff, opposite the present-day Arcul de Triumf. The ground remained an important venue for football matches in Bucharest for years afterwards.

== Honours ==
Romanian Football Championship

- Runners-up (1): 1912–13
- Third place (1): 1913–14

== League history ==
Season	Tier	Division	Place	Notes
1913–14	1	Romanian Football Championship	3rd	Final national season
1912–13	1	Romanian Football Championship	2nd	Runners-up
