= 1920–21 Divizia A =

9th season of top-tier football league in Romania

Divizia A
- Season: 1920–21
- Champions: Tricolor București

The 1920–21 Divizia A was the ninth season of Divizia A, the top-level football league of Romania.

Many years it was recorded that Venus București was the champion in 1921, because of some reports found in the press at the time. However, Romanian journalist Romeo Ionescu uncovered that the actual winner was Unirea Tricolor București, after a victory in the championship final against Venus (3–2).

== Final table ==
Pos	Team	Pld	W	D	L	GF	GA	GD	Pts
1	Tricolor București (C)	9	7	0	2	–	–	—	14
2	Venus București	6	4	1	1	–	–	—	9
3	Prahova Ploiești	5	3	0	2	–	–	—	6
4	Colțea București	10	2	1	7	–	–	—	5
5	Excelsior București	8	1	0	7	–	–	—	2
6	Educația Fizică București	8	1	0	7	–	–	—	2

(C) Champions
