= Colțea București =

- Full name: CS Colțea București
- Short name: Colțea
- Founded: 10 June 1913
- Dissolved: 1938
- Ground: "Bolta Rece"
- League: Divizia C (last time)
Home colours	Away colours

Colțea București was a Romanian football club based in Bucharest, active primarily in the early 20th century. The club played a significant role in the development of Romanian football and was one of the strongest teams during its time

== History ==
Colțea București came from the desire to create a club at the time made up only of Romanian football. The headquarters of the club was "Bolta Rece", the current Arcul de Triumf Stadium, next to Arcul de Triumf and next to Herăstrău Park. The club was founded to oppose foreign American, English and German teams and to prove Romanian sporting abilities.

In June 1913, a few students at the "St. Sava" created a football team. Because they were neighbors, gave him the street name: "Colțea".

In 1915 and 1916 the team won the Cup Harwester, Category II, using this team players: M. Stroescu – D.Georgescu – V. Cristescu, Rizescu – N. Secăreanu, Oancea, C. Iordănescu – Iacobescu, P.Pavel, Polieni, B. Grăjdănescu, Fl. Iordăchescu.

Colțea played in the 1914–1915, 1915–1916, 1919–1920, 1920–21 seasons in the pre-divisional national championship. In 1920, the club established branches in Brașov and Ploiești. The club subsequently played in the Bucharest Local Championship, except in 1937–1938 when it represented Divizia C. There is no record of the club's activity after World War II.

Three of the team's players, Vintilă Cristescu, Puiu Pavel and Iacobescu founded in the year 1920 in Brașov another club with the same name, Colțea Brașov, which managed to win the national championship in the 1927–28 season.

== Divizia A history ==
Season	League	Pos.	Played	W	D	L	GS	GA	Points	Notes	Ref
1914–15	Divizia A	5	10	2	–	8	5	35	4p	5th place	
1915–16	Divizia A	3	6	–	3	3	3	13	3p	3rd place	
1919–20	Divizia A	3	4	1	1	2	4	6	3p	3rd place	

== Performances ==
- Third Place in Romanian Football Championship (2): 1915–16, 1919–20.

== See also ==
- Colțea Brașov
