= 1919–20 Divizia A =

8th season of top-tier football league in Romania

Divizia A
- Season: 1919–20
- Champions: Venus București

The 1919–20 Divizia A was the eighth season of Divizia A, the top-level football league of Romania.

== Final table ==
Pos	Team	Pld	W	D	L	GF	GA	GD	Pts
1	Venus București (C)	6	4	1	1	8	6	+2	9
2	Tricolor București	5	3	0	2	9	6	+3	6
3	Colțea București	4	1	1	2	4	6	−2	3
4	Prahova Ploiești	3	0	0	3	1	4	−3	0

(C) Champions
