= 1912–13 Divizia A =

4th season of top-tier football league in Romania

Divizia A
- Season: 1912–13
- Champions: Colentina București

The 1912–13 Divizia A was the fourth season of Divizia A, the top-level football league of Romania.

== Final table ==
Pos	Team	Pld	W	D	L	GF	GA	GD	Pts
1	Colentina București (C)	8	8	0	0	33	3	+30	16
2	Cercul Atletic București	7	3	0	4	17	20	−3	6
3	Bukarester FC	6	2	1	3	13	16	−3	5
4	United Ploiești	3	2	0	1	5	5	0	4
5	Olympia București	7	1	1	5	11	17	−6	3
6	Uniunea Sportivă București	3	0	0	3	2	20	−18	0

(C) Champions
