= Rareș Lazăr =

Romanian footballer

Personal information
- Full name: Rareș Ștefănuț Lazăr
- Date of birth: 28 March 1999 (age 27)
- Place of birth: Vaslui, Romania
- Height: 1.86 m (6 ft 1 in)
- Position: Midfielder

Team information
- Current team: Unirea Slobozia
- Number: 5

Youth career
- 2009–2014: Vaslui
- 2014–2016: Tottenham Hotspur

Senior career*
Years	Team	Apps	(Gls)
2014	Vaslui	2	(0)
2016–2019	Mioveni	52	(3)
2019–2023	Rapid București	45	(0)
2021–2022	→ ASU Politehnica Timișoara (loan)	23	(1)
2022–2023	→ FC Brașov (loan)	21	(5)
2023–2026	Concordia Chiajna	60	(2)
2026–	Unirea Slobozia	10	(0)

International career
2015	Romania U16	1	(0)
2016	Romania U18	5	(0)
2018	Romania U19	3	(0)
- * Club domestic league appearances and goals as of 31 October 2026

Rareș Ștefănuț Lazăr (born 28 March 1999) is a Romanian professional footballer who plays as a midfielder for Liga II club Unirea Slobozia.

== Club career ==
Lazăr made his Liga I debut on 17 May 2014 for FC Vaslui in a 0-2 defeat against Ceahlăul Piatra Neamț, being, at 15 years, 1 month and 19 days, the second youngest player who made his debut in the first league, after Nicolae Dobrin. He also entered in the history as FC Vaslui youngest player in an official match.\

== Career statistics ==
As of match played 31 October 2026

Appearances and goals by club, season and competition
Club	Season	League			Cupa României		Europe		Other		Total	
Club	Season	Division	Apps	Goals	Apps	Goals	Apps	Goals	Apps	Goals	Apps	Goals
Vaslui	2013–14	Liga I	2	0	0	0	—		—		2	0
Mioveni	2015–16	Liga II	1	0	0	0	—		—		1	0
Mioveni	2017–18	Liga II	21	2	0	0	—		—		21	2
Mioveni	2018–19	Liga II	30	1	3	0	—		—		33	1
Mioveni	Total		52	3	3	0	—		—		55	3
Rapid București	2019–20	Liga II	21	0	0	0	—		—		21	0
Rapid București	2020–21	Liga II	24	0	0	0	—		—		24	0
Rapid București	Total		45	0	0	0	—		—		45	0
ASU Politehnica Timișoara (loan)	2021–22	Liga II	23	1	3	0	—		2	0	28	1
FC Brașov (loan)	2022–23	Liga II	21	5	1	0	—		—		22	5
Concordia Chiajna	2023–24	Liga II	20	1	1	0	—		—		21	1
Concordia Chiajna	2024–25	Liga II	18	1	2	0	—		—		20	1
Concordia Chiajna	2025–26	Liga II	22	0	4	0	—		—		26	0
Concordia Chiajna	Total		60	2	7	0	—		—		67	2
Unirea Slobozia	2026–27	Liga II	10	0	1	0	—		—		11	0
Career total			213	11	15	0	0	0	2	0	230	11
