= 1909–10 Divizia A =

1st season of top-tier football league in Romania

Divizia A
- Season: 1909–10
- Champions: Olympia București

The 1909–10 Divizia A was the first season of Divizia A, the top-level football league of Romania. It was contested by only three teams, and Olympia București were crowned champions of the inaugural edition.

== Background ==
In Romania, football was introduced near the beginning of the twentieth century. The first football association in Romania is founded in October 1909 under the name ASAR (acronym for Asociaţiunea Societăţilor Atletice din România, which roughly translates as Association of Romanian Athletic Societies). ASAR had three founding clubs: Olympia and Colentina București from Bucharest and United Ploiești from Ploiești.

This three clubs, which consisted mainly of non-Romanian players, contested the first three edition of the Romanian football league.

== Overview ==
The three pioneer clubs in the Divizia A were Olympia București, Colentina București and United Ploiești. Each team played a fixture against the other two clubs, totalizing a number of three matches disputed. The result of the match between United and Olympia was not recorded, and thus there is the possibility that Colentina won the title. However, most sources agree with Olympia's triumph.

== Final table ==
Pos	Team	Pld	W	D	L	GF	GA	GD	Pts
1	Olympia București (C)	2	1	1	0	5	4	+1	3
2	Colentina București	2	1	0	1	3	2	+1	2
3	United Ploiești	2	0	1	1	3	5	−2	1

(C) Champions
