= Liga I =

Romanian football league

Superliga
- Organising body: Liga Profesionistă de Fotbal (Liga I)
- Founded: 1909; 117 years ago
- Country: Romania
- Confederation: UEFA
- Number of clubs: 16 (since 2020–21)
- Level on pyramid: 1
- Relegation to: Liga II
- Domestic cup(s): Cupa României; Supercupa României
- International cup(s): UEFA Champions League; UEFA Europa League; UEFA Conference League
- Current champions: Universitatea Craiova (5th titles) (Note: Disputed by FC U Craiova; in September 2017, the LPF recognised the current club's records from 1948 to 1991, based on a 2013 association agreement under which the Universitatea Craiova sports club contributed the historic club's name, crest, colours, and honours.) (2025–26)
- Most championships: FCSB (28 titles) (Note: Disputed by CSA Steaua București; Romanian courts ruled that CSA Steaua holds the honours from 1947 to 1998, while the LPF and UEFA have at times presented the clubs' history inconsistently. See Steaua București football records dispute.)
- Most appearances: Dan Nistor (516)
- Top scorer: Dudu Georgescu (252)
- Broadcaster: Digi Sport Prima Sport Arena Sport
- Website: lpf.ro
- Current: 2026–27 Liga I

Liga I (Romanian pronunciation: [ˈliɡa ɨnˈtɨj]; First League), also known as Liga 1 and officially branded as Superliga for sponsorship reasons, is a professional association football league in Romania and the highest level of the Romanian football league system. Contested by 16 clubs, it operates on a system of promotion and relegation with Liga II and is administered by the Liga Profesionistă de Fotbal (LPF). Since 2020, the competition has consisted of a 30-match regular season followed by championship play-offs and relegation play-outs.

Established in 1909, the competition began with the 1909–10 season and is currently ranked 25th in UEFA's league coefficient standings. Until the 2006–07 season, it was known as Divizia A, before being renamed following a trademark dispute.

FCSB is the competition's most successful club with 28 titles, followed by city rival Dinamo București with 18 trophies. Other multiple-time champions include CFR Cluj (eight titles), Venus București (seven), Chinezul Timișoara and UTA Arad (six each), Universitatea Craiova (five), Ripensia Timișoara and Petrolul Ploiești (four each), and Rapid București (three).

== Competition format ==
Since 2020, the Liga I has operated with a 16-team format. Each team plays all other teams twice, resulting in 30 matches per club. After this regular season, teams are ranked by total points and split according to their position into either the championship play-offs or the relegation play-outs. At this stage, points are halved, and secondary criteria such as goal difference and goals scored are removed.

The six teams that qualify for the championship play-offs compete in an additional ten matches, while the remaining ten teams in the relegation play-outs face each other once, resulting in nine additional fixtures per team. The winners of the championship play-offs are crowned Liga I champions.

The teams finishing 9th and 10th in the play-out are relegated directly to Liga II, while the 7th- and 8th-placed teams enter a two-legged play-off against the 3rd- and 4th-placed teams from the second division.

Additionally, the 1st- and 2nd-placed teams in the play-out face each other in a single match, with the winner then facing a team from the play-offs (usually the 3rd- or 4th-placed) for a place in European competitions. The winner of this final one-legged match qualifies for the following season's UEFA Conference League.

== History ==
=== Early championships (1909–1921) ===
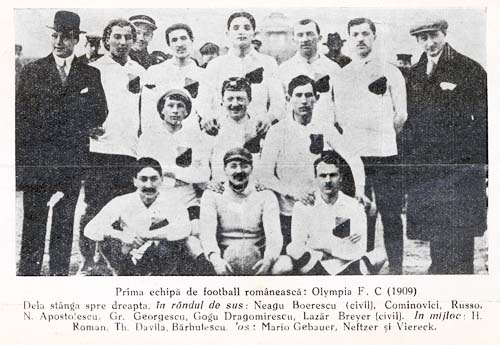
Olympia București, the 1909–10 Divizia A champions.

The first official national football competition in Romania was organised in 1909 by the "Association of Athletic Societies in Romania" (Romanian: Asociațiunea Societăților Atletice din România), the predecessor of the Romanian Football Federation. The inaugural championship featured three clubs—Olympia, Colentina, and United—with Olympia București winning the title.

Between 1909 and 1921, the competition was contested through regional championships followed by a national play-off to determine the Romanian champions. The tournament was suspended between 1916 and 1919 because of World War I.

=== Divizia A (1921–2006) ===
The 1921–22 season marked the establishment of a nationwide league system with the creation of Divizia A and Divizia B. The inaugural championship was won by Chinezul Timișoara, which, together with Venus București and later Ripensia Timișoara, dominated the interwar period before the competition was suspended in 1940 due to World War II.

Following the resumption of football after the war, the championship was largely dominated by UTA Arad, CCA București (later renamed Steaua), and Dinamo București. During the following decades, Dinamo striker Dudu Georgescu became one of the league's most prolific goalscorers, winning the European Golden Shoe in 1975 and 1977, while Rodion Cămătaru and Dorin Mateuț later repeated the feat in 1987 and 1989 respectively.

Romanian clubs also enjoyed their greatest European successes during the communist Divizia A era. Steaua București won the 1985–86 European Cup and reached another final in 1988–89, while Universitatea Craiova and Dinamo București reached the quarter-finals and semi-finals respectively during the 1980s.

=== Liga I (2006–present) ===
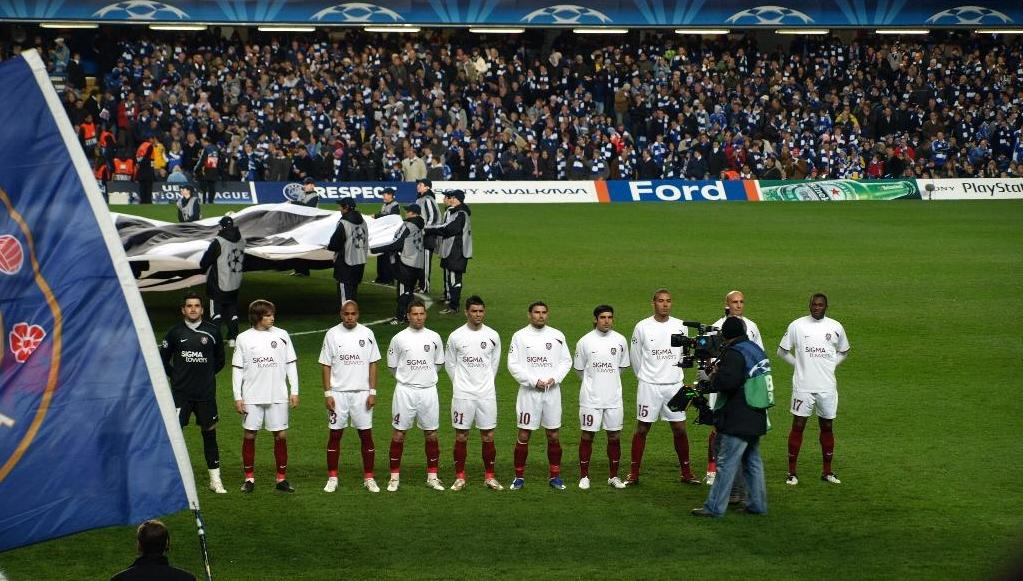
CFR Cluj (pictured at Stamford Bridge in a 2008–09 UEFA Champions League match against Chelsea) won eight championships under the new name of Liga I.

At the beginning of the 2006–07 season, the competition was renamed from Divizia A to Liga I following a trademark dispute over the original name. The change was approved by the Romanian Football Federation, which simultaneously renamed the lower divisions to Liga II and Liga III. The period that followed saw the end of the traditional dominance of Bucharest clubs, as CFR Cluj, Unirea Urziceni, and Oțelul Galați won their first national championships between 2008 and 2011.

CFR Cluj became the first club outside Bucharest to qualify directly for the group stage of the Champions League in the modern era, and later recorded the best group stage performance by a Romanian side after collecting ten points in the 2012–13 season. The 2010s also produced new champions in the form of Astra Giurgiu and Viitorul Constanța, reflecting a broader competitive balance within Romanian football.

Beginning with the 2015–16 season, the league adopted its current format, consisting of a regular season followed by championship play-offs and relegation play-outs. During this period, CFR Cluj further established itself as one of the dominant forces in the country, winning five consecutive league titles and becoming the first Romanian club to reach the group stage of the Europa Conference League.

In the 2025–26 season, Universitatea Craiova managed to win its first league title in 35 years, bringing its total tally to five.

== Clubs ==
=== Top-three finishes by club ===
Legend
The clubs currently play in the 2026–27 Liga I.
The clubs currently play in the lower leagues.
The clubs are defunct or no longer have a senior team.

Club	Winners	Runners-up	Third places	Winning years	Runner-up years	Third-place years (Note: Third-place totals include only seasons with an identifiable overall third place in the national championship. The knockout national championships from 1921–22 to 1931–32, the disputed 1920–21 season, and split-group seasons without an overall third-place classification (1932–33, 1933–34 and 1937–38) are not counted as third-place finishes.)
FCSB	28	20	9	1951, 1952, 1953, 1956, 1959–60, 1960–61, 1967–68, 1975–76, 1977–78, 1984–85, 1985–86, 1986–87, 1987–88, 1988–89, 1992–93, 1993–94, 1994–95, 1995–96, 1996–97, 1997–98, 2000–01, 2004–05, 2005–06, 2012–13, 2013–14, 2014–15, 2023–24, 2024–25	1954, 1957–58, 1962–63, 1976–77, 1979–80, 1983–84, 1989–90, 1990–91, 1991–92, 2002–03, 2003–04, 2006–07, 2007–08, 2015–16, 2016–17, 2017–18, 2018–19, 2020–21, 2021–22, 2022–23	1958–59, 1963–64, 1964–65, 1969–70, 1970–71, 1978–79, 1998–99, 1999–00, 2011–12
Dinamo București	18	20	10	1955, 1961–62, 1962–63, 1963–64, 1964–65, 1970–71, 1972–73, 1974–75, 1976–77, 1981–82, 1982–83, 1983–84, 1989–90, 1991–92, 1999–2000, 2001–02, 2003–04, 2006–07	1951, 1952, 1953, 1956, 1958–59, 1960–61, 1966–67, 1968–69, 1973–74, 1975–76, 1978–79, 1980–81, 1984–85, 1986–87, 1987–88, 1988–89, 1992–93, 1998–99, 2000–01, 2004–05	1954, 1965–66, 1967–68, 1990–91, 1993–94, 1994–95, 1996–97, 2005–06, 2008–09, 2016–17
CFR Cluj	8	2	4	2007–08, 2009–10, 2011–12, 2017–18, 2018–19, 2019–20, 2020–21, 2021–22	2023–24, 2024–25	2006–07, 2014–15, 2022–23, 2025–26
Venus București (Note: The attribution of the 1920–21 title is disputed. RomanianSoccer's reconstruction records Tricolor București as champion and states that the documentary evidence does not justify crediting Venus with that title, while RSSSF lists Venus as champion and therefore gives Venus eight titles.)	7	1	1	1919–20, 1928–29, 1931–32, 1933–34, 1936–37, 1938–39, 1939–40	1920–21	1934–35
UTA Arad	6	1	1	1946–47, 1947–48, 1950, 1954, 1968–69, 1969–70	1971–72	1953
Chinezul Timișoara	6	0	0	1921–22, 1922–23, 1923–24, 1924–25, 1925–26, 1926–27	—	—
Universitatea Craiova	5	6	12	1973–74, 1979–80, 1980–81, 1990–91, 2025–26	1972–73, 1981–82, 1982–83, 1993–94, 1994–95, 2019–20	1966–67, 1974–75, 1976–77, 1983–84, 1985–86, 1989–90, 1992–93, 2017–18, 2020–21, 2021–22, 2023–24, 2024–25
Petrolul Ploiești (Note: The 1929–30 championship and the 1935–36 third-place finish recorded by Juventus București are grouped with Petrolul Ploiești; Petrolul's official club history describes Juventus as the predecessor of the present club and the 1930 championship as its first national title.)	4	3	4	1929–30, 1957–58, 1958–59, 1965–66	1925–26, 1955, 1961–62	1935–36, 1959–60, 2012–13, 2013–14
Ripensia Timișoara	4	2	2	1932–33, 1934–35, 1935–36, 1937–38	1933–34, 1938–39	1936–37, 1940–41
Rapid București	3	14	8	1966–67, 1998–99, 2002–03	1936–37, 1937–38, 1939–40, 1940–41, 1948–49, 1950, 1963–64, 1964–65, 1965–66, 1969–70, 1970–71, 1997–98, 1999–2000, 2005–06	1947–48, 1960–61, 1968–69, 1995–96, 2001–02, 2003–04, 2004–05, 2007–08
Argeș Pitești	2	2	4	1971–72, 1978–79	1967–68, 1977–78	1972–73, 1979–80, 1980–81, 1997–98
Colentina București	2	2	2	1912–13, 1913–14	1909–10, 1911–12	1910–11, 1914–15
Prahova Ploiești (Note: RomanianSoccer treats United AC Ploiești as part of the historical Prahova Ploiești line and credits the club with the 1911–12 and 1915–16 championships.)	2	2	2	1911–12, 1915–16	1910–11, 1914–15	1909–10, 1920–21
Unirea Tricolor București	2	1	0	1920–21, 1940–41	1919–20	—
Olympia București	2	0	1	1909–10, 1910–11	—	1911–12
Farul Constanța (Note: The 2021 merger between Farul Constanța and Viitorul Constanța, and the attribution of Viitorul's honours (including the 2016–17 Liga I title) to Farul are disputed.)	2	0	1	2016–17, 2022–23	—	2018–19
Club Atletic Oradea	1	2	1	1948–49	1923–24, 1934–35	1951
Astra Giurgiu	1	1	1	2015–16	2013–14	2019–20
Colțea Brașov	1	1	0	1927–28	1926–27	—
CSM Reșița	1	1	0	1930–31	1931–32	—
Unirea Urziceni	1	1	0	2008–09	2009–10	—
Româno-Americană București	1	0	0	1914–15	—	—
Oțelul Galați	1	0	0	2010–11	—	—
Progresul București	0	3	2	—	1995–96, 1996–97, 2001–02	1955, 1961–62
Victoria Cluj	0	3	0	—	1921–22, 1922–23, 1928–29	—
Politehnica Timișoara	0	2	5	—	2008–09, 2010–11	1950, 1956, 1957–58, 1962–63, 1977–78
Bukarester FC	0	2	1	—	1913–14, 1915–16	1912–13
Universitatea Cluj	0	2	1	—	1932–33, 2025–26	1971–72
Sportul Studențesc București	0	1	3	—	1985–86	1939–40, 1982–83, 1984–85
FC Brașov	0	1	2	—	1959–60	1973–74, 2000–01
FC Vaslui	0	1	2	—	2011–12	2009–10, 2010–11
Cercul Atletic București	0	1	1	—	1912–13	1913–14
Vagonul Arad	0	1	1	—	1935–36	1938–39
CFR Timișoara	0	1	1	—	1947–48	1946–47
ASA Târgu Mureș	0	1	1	—	1974–75	1975–76
Jiul Petroșani	0	1	1	—	1924–25	1948–49
Pandurii Târgu Jiu	0	1	1	—	2012–13	2015–16
Minerul Lupeni	0	1	0	—	1927–28	—
Gloria Arad	0	1	0	—	1929–30	—
Societatea Gimnastică Sibiu	0	1	0	—	1930–31	—
Carmen București	0	1	0	—	1946–47	—
ASA 2013 Târgu Mureș	0	1	0	—	2014–15	—
Victoria București	0	0	3	—	—	1986–87, 1987–88, 1988–89
Colțea București	0	0	2	—	—	1915–16, 1919–20
CA Câmpulung Moldovenesc	0	0	1	—	—	1952
Corvinul Hunedoara	0	0	1	—	—	1981–82
Electroputere Craiova	0	0	1	—	—	1991–92
Gloria Bistrița	0	0	1	—	—	2002–03

No championships were held from 1916–17 to 1918–19 because of World War I, or from 1941–42 to 1945–46 because of World War II. Third place is omitted from 1921–22 to 1931–32 because the national competition used a knockout format without an official third-place match/ranking. The 1932–33, 1933–34, and 1937–38 seasons used group formats and also did not produce an official third place.

== Sponsorship ==
On 19 December 1998, SABMiller acquired the naming rights for four and a half seasons, becoming the first sponsor in the history of the competition. The company renamed the competition "Divizia A Ursus" to promote its Ursus beer brand. In 2004, European Drinks & Foods, a Romanian company with approximately $1.3 billion USD in revenue, became the league’s main sponsor, renaming the competition "Divizia A Bürger" to promote its Bürger beer brand.

In May 2008, Realitatea Media acquired the naming rights, resulting in the competition being renamed "Liga I Realitatea" in promotion of Realitatea TV. Later that year, European Drinks & Foods regained the rights and rebranded the league as "Liga I Frutti Fresh", after one of its soft drink brands.

For the 2009–10 season, online betting company Gamebookers purchased the naming rights, renaming the competition "Liga 1 Gamebookers.com". This was followed in July 2010 by Bergenbier, a member of the StarBev Group, which secured the naming rights for four seasons and renamed the competition "Liga I Bergenbier" to promote its beer brand.

From the 2015–16 season, French telecommunications company Orange became the league’s main sponsor after acquiring the naming rights for two years, resulting in the name "Liga 1 Orange". In 2017, online gaming operator Betano became title sponsor for two seasons, followed by national operator Casa Pariurilor, which renamed the competition "Casa Liga 1" for the 2019–20 season. Since 2022, Romanian gambling operator Superbet has served as title sponsor, with the competition adopting the name "Superliga".

== Media coverage ==
In 2004, Telesport, a small television network, acquired the broadcasting rights for $28 million under a four-season contract that ran until the summer of 2008. During this period, Telesport sub-licensed part of the coverage to other Romanian broadcasters, including TVR1, Antena 1, Național TV, and Kanal D.

On 31 March 2008, Antena 1 and RCS & RDS outbid Realitatea Media and Kanal D in a broadcasting rights auction, securing a €102 million deal for three seasons.

In 2011, broadcasting rights were acquired by RCS & RDS for its channels Digi Sport 1, Digi Sport 2, and Digi Sport 3. The network broadcast seven of the nine matches per round, while the remaining two matches were shown by Antena 1 (an Intact Media Group channel) and Dolce Sport, owned by Telekom Romania.

In March 2014, the LPF announced that the broadcasting rights had been sold for a five-year period to a company from the European Union, without disclosing its name. A month later, it was revealed that Look TV and Look Plus had secured the rights to broadcast Liga I and Cupa Ligii matches for the 2014–2019 period.

== EA Sports ==
On 27 August 2019, Liga I signed a contract with EA Sports for the rights to feature the league in FIFA 20. This marked the first time Liga I was included in a sports video game. Since then, Liga I has been featured in every subsequent FIFA installment.

== Records ==
=== Players ===
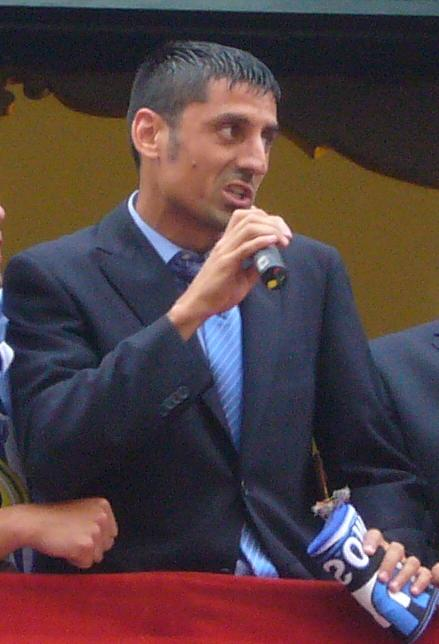
Ionel Dănciulescu made 515 league appearances for Electroputere Craiova, Dinamo București, and Steaua București.

Top Ten Players With Most Appearances As of 28 August 2026
Player		Period	Club	Games
1	(Romania) **Dan Nistor**	2010–	Pandurii Târgu Jiu, Dinamo București, CFR Cluj, Universitatea Craiova, Universitatea Cluj	516
2	(Romania) Ionel Dănciulescu	1993–2014	Electroputere Craiova, Dinamo București, Steaua București	515
3	(Romania) Costică Ștefănescu	1968–1988	Steaua București, Universitatea Craiova, FC Brașov	490
4	(Romania) Florea Ispir	1969–1988	ASA Târgu Mureș	485
5	(Romania) László Bölöni	1971–1988	ASA Târgu Mureș, Steaua București	484
6	(Romania) Costel Câmpeanu	1987–2005	FCM Bacău, Dinamo București, Gloria Bistrița, Progresul București, Ceahlăul Piatra Neamț	470
7	(Romania) Petre Marin	1993–2012	Sportul Studențesc, Național București, Rapid București, Steaua București, Unirea Urziceni, Concordia Chiajna	468
8	(Romania) Paul Cazan	1972–1988	Sportul Studențesc	465
9	(Romania) Cornel Dinu	1966–1983	Dinamo București	454
10	(Portugal) (Romania) **Mário Camora**	2011–	CFR Cluj	453

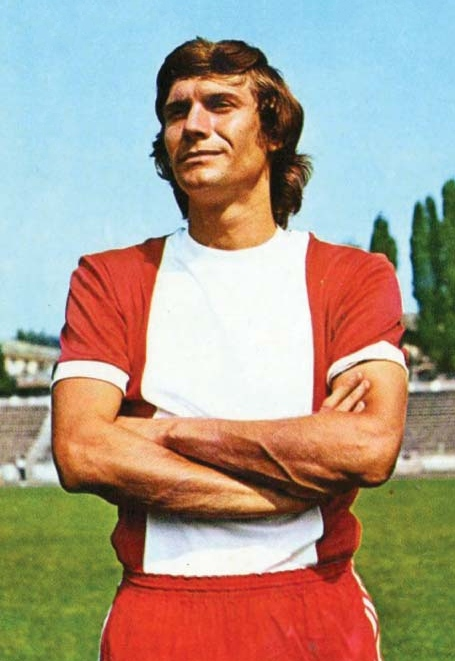
Dudu Georgescu is the highest goalscorer of the Liga I with 252 goals.

Top Ten Highest Goalscorers As of 6 June 2026
Player		Period	Club	Goals
1	(Romania) Dudu Georgescu	1970–1987	Progresul București, CSM Reșița, Dinamo București, FCM Bacău, Gloria Buzău, Flacăra Moreni	252 (Ø 0,68)
2	(Romania) Ionel Dănciulescu	1993–2014	Electroputere Craiova, Dinamo București, Steaua București	214 (Ø 0,41)
3	(Romania) Rodion Cămătaru	1974–1989	Universitatea Craiova, Dinamo București	198 (Ø 0,52)
4	(Romania) Marin Radu	1974–1989	Argeș Pitești, Olt Scornicești, Steaua București, Inter Sibiu	190 (Ø 0,49)
5	(Romania) Ion Oblemenco	1963–1977	Rapid București, Universitatea Craiova	170 (Ø 0,62)
5	(Romania) Florea Dumitrache	1966–1983	Dinamo București, Jiul Petroșani, Corvinul Hunedoara	170 (Ø 0,47)
7	(Romania) Mircea Sandu	1970–1987	Progresul București, Sportul Studențesc	167 (Ø 0,41)
8	(Romania) Victor Pițurcă	1975–1989	Universitatea Craiova, Olt Scornicești, Steaua București	166 (Ø 0,55)
9	(Romania) Mihai Adam	1962–1976	Universitatea Cluj, Vagonul Arad, CFR Cluj	160 (Ø 0,45)
10	(Romania) Titus Ozon	1947–1964	Unirea Tricolor, Dinamo București, Dinamo Brașov, Progresul București, Rapid București	157 (Ø 0,58)

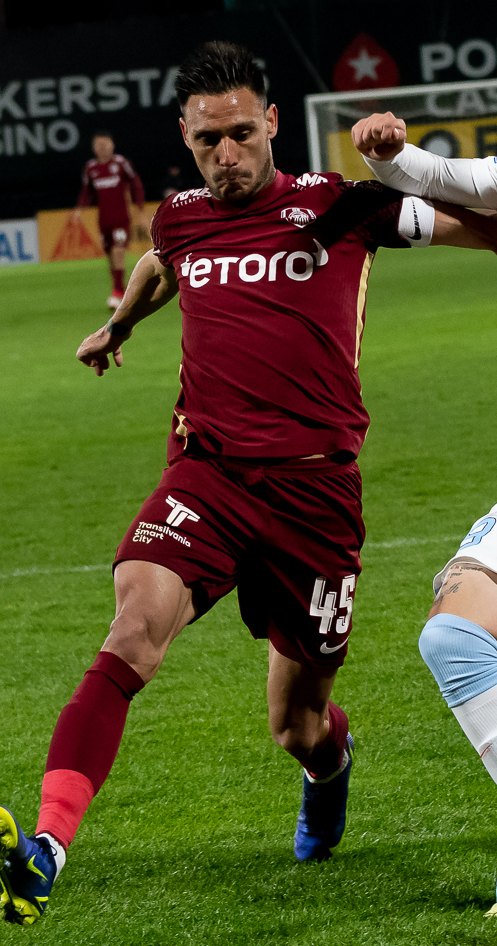
Camora is the foreign player with the most Liga I appearances, all for CFR Cluj.

Top Ten Foreign Players With Most Appearances As of 6 June 2026
Player		Period	Club	Games
1	(Portugal) **Mário Camora**	2011–	CFR Cluj	453
2	(Japan) Takayuki Seto	2009–2026	Astra Giurgiu, Petrolul Ploiești, Argeș Pitești	362
3	(Brazil) Júnior Morais	2010–2026	Astra Giurgiu, FCSB, Rapid București, Metaloglobus București	320
4	(Montenegro) **Risto Radunović**	2017–	Astra Giurgiu, FCSB	269
5	(Croatia) Adnan Aganović	2013–2025	FC Brașov, Viitorul Constanța, Steaua București, Sepsi OSK, Unirea Slobozia	261
6	(Portugal) Ricardinho	2018–2026	Voluntari, Petrolul Ploiești	243
7	(Ivory Coast) Ousmane Viera	2009–2021	CFR Cluj, Internațional Curtea de Argeș, Pandurii Târgu Jiu, Sepsi OSK, Hermannstadt	235
8	(Moldova) Vadim Rață	2021–	Voluntari, FCSB, Universitatea Cluj, Argeș Pitești	234
9	(Brazil) Eric de Oliveira	2008–2021	Gaz Metan Mediaș, Pandurii Târgu Jiu, Viitorul Constanța, Voluntari	222
10	(Bulgaria) Radoslav Dimitrov	2015–2024	Botoșani, CSU Craiova, Sepsi OSK, Universitatea Cluj	216

Player obtained Romanian citizenship and represented Romania internationally
Player obtained Romanian citizenship, but did not represent Romania internationally

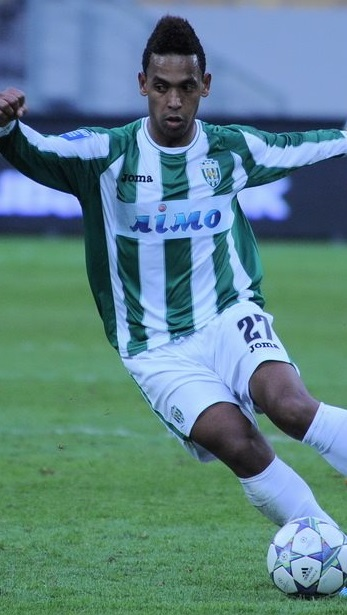
Eric de Oliveira scored 66 goals and is the highest foreign goalscorer.

Top Ten Highest Foreign Players Goalscorers As of 6 June 2026
Player		Period	Club	Goals
1	(Brazil) Eric de Oliveira	2008–2021	Gaz Metan Mediaș, Pandurii Târgu Jiu, Viitorul Constanța, Voluntari	66 (Ø 0,29)
2	(Brazil) Wesley	2008–2015	Vaslui, Politehnica Iași	64 (Ø 0,52)
3	(France) Harlem Gnohéré	2015–2020	Dinamo București, FCSB	58 (Ø 0,42)
4	(Bosnia and Herzegovina) Bojan Golubović	2011–2018	Ceahlăul Piatra Neamț, Politehnica Iași, Steaua București, Gaz Metan Mediaș, Botoșani	55 (Ø 0,27)
5	(Greece) Pantelis Kapetanos	2008–2014	FCSB, CFR Cluj	48 (Ø 0,38)
6	(Croatia) Gabriel Debeljuh	2019–2026	Hermannstadt, CFR Cluj, Sepsi OSK	47 (Ø 0,29)
6	(Bosnia and Herzegovina) Elvir Koljić	2018–2026	CSU Craiova, Rapid București	47 (Ø 0,25)
6	(Slovakia) Adam Nemec	2016–2024	Dinamo București, Voluntari	47 (Ø 0,24)
9	(Nigeria) **Kehinde Fatai**	2007–2024	Farul Constanța, Astra Giurgiu, Argeș Pitești, Oțelul Galați	46 (Ø 0,25)
10	(Jordan) Tha'er Bawab	2010–2019	Gloria Bistrița, Gaz Metan Mediaș, CSU Craiova, Steaua București, Dinamo București, Concordia Chiajna	42 (Ø 0,20)

Player obtained Romanian citizenship, but did not represent Romania internationally

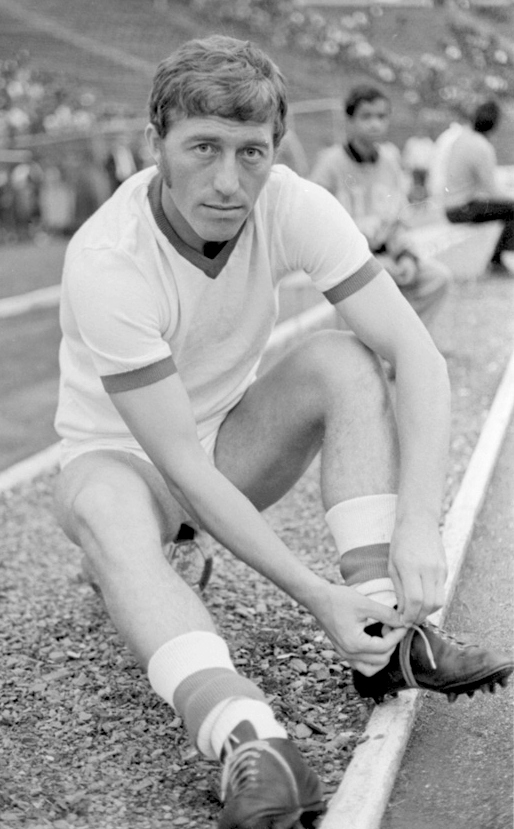
Nicolae Dobrin made his Divizia A debut aged 14 years, 10 months and 5 days.

Top Ten Youngest Debutants As of 6 June 2026. The teams written in bold are the ones the players debuted at
Player		Age	Match	Season	Date
1	(Romania) Nicolae Dobrin	14 years, 10 months and 5 days	Știința Cluj - **Dinamo Pitești** 5–1	1961–62	1 July 1962
2	(Romania) Alexandru Stoian	14 years, 10 months and 13 days	FC U Craiova - **Farul Constanța** 1–2	2022–23	28 October 2022
3	(Romania) Alexandru Bota	14 years, 11 months and 13 days	CFR Cluj - **Universitatea Cluj** 4–0	2022–23	13 March 2023
4	(Romania) Rareș Lazăr	15 years, one month and 19 days	Ceahlăul Piatra Neamț - **FC Vaslui** 2–0	2013–14	17 May 2014
5	(Romania) Răzvan Popa	15 years, 2 months and 13 days	Dinamo București - **Sportul Studențesc** 1–3	2011–12	17 March 2012
6	(Romania) Codrin Epure	15 years, 2 months and 21 days	**FC Vaslui** - Astra Giurgiu 1–4	2013–14	19 May 2014
7	(Romania) Vasile Chitaru	15 years, 4 months and 14 days	**SC Bacău** - Jiul Petroșani 3–0	1973–74	19 May 1974
8	(Romania) Ștefan Harsanyi	15 years, 4 months and 22 days	**Bihor Oradea** - Sportul Studențesc 2–0	1982–83	2 July 1983
9	(Romania) Dorel Zamfir	15 years, 5 months and 16 days	**FC Constanța** - Steaua București 0–1	1976–77	16 March 1977
10	(Romania) Enes Sali	15 years, 5 months and 17 days	**Farul Constanța** - Sepsi OSK 1–0	2021–22	9 August 2021

=== Managers ===
Top Ten Managers With Most Appearances As of 6 June 2026
Manager		Period	Matches	Victories	Draws	Losses	Victory percentage
1	(Romania) Florin Halagian	1972–2011	878	432	176	270	59%
2	(Romania) Ilie Oană	1952–1979	572	232	124	216	51%
3	(Romania) Nicolae Dumitru	1962–1993	558	250	120	188	55%
4	(Romania) Ion V. Ionescu	1967–1994	496	194	89	213	48%
5	(Romania) Viorel Hizo	1990–2013	488	221	85	182	53%
6	(Romania) Ioan Andone	1994–2017	456	207	80	169	54%
7	(Romania) Florin Marin	1993–2017	456	166	103	187	47%
8	(Romania) Valentin Stănescu	1962–1984	455	206	101	148	56%
9	(Romania) Sorin Cârțu	1989–2013	454	175	114	165	51%
10	(Romania) Angelo Niculescu	1953–1982	445	196	101	148	55%

=== Referees ===
Top Ten Referees With Most Appearances As of 6 June 2026
Referee		Period	Matches
1	(Romania) **Sebastian Colțescu**	2003–2026	423
2	(Romania) **István Kovács**	2008–	382
3	(Romania) Alexandru Tudor	1999–2018	381
4	(Romania) Cristian Balaj	2000–2016	341
5	(Romania) **Radu Petrescu**	2007–	310
6	(Romania) Ovidiu Hațegan	2006–2024	308
7	(Romania) Sorin Corpodean	1997–2009	268
8	(Romania) Nicolae Rainea	1964–1984	267
9	(Romania) **Marcel Bîrsan**	2012–	261
10	(Romania) Marius Avram	2007–2020	246

== International competitions ==
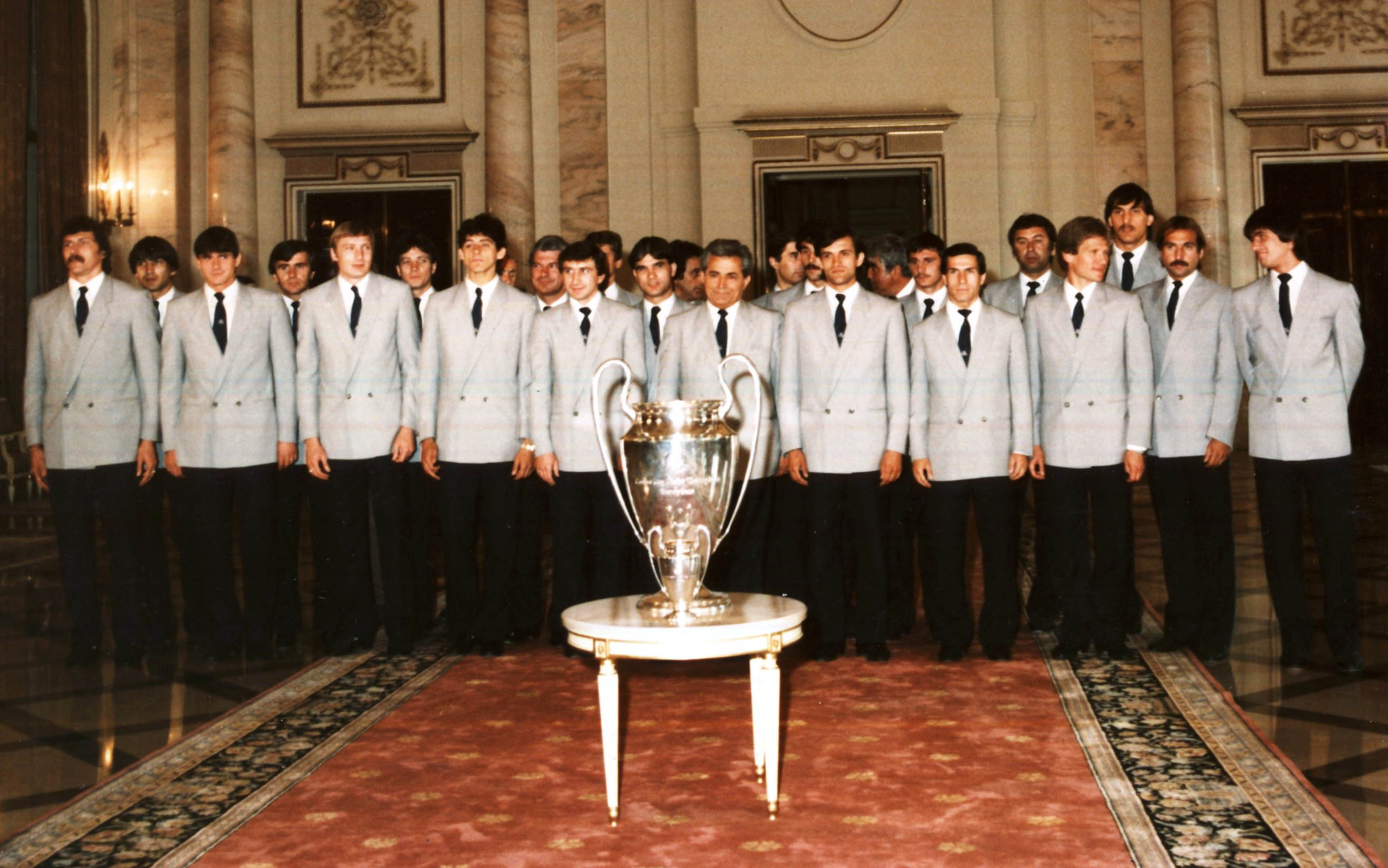
Steaua București, the most successful team in the championship, also won the 1985–86 European Cup.

=== Performance in international competitions ===
From the quarter-finals onwards.

Club	Results
Steaua București 2 cups and 2 finals	European Cup/UEFA Champions League (1) + (1): winners in 1986; finalists in 1989; semi-finalists in 1988; UEFA Cup Winners' Cup: quarter-finalists in 1972 and 1993; UEFA Super Cup (1): winners in 1986; Intercontinental Cup (1): finalists in 1986
Dinamo București	European Cup/UEFA Champions League: semi-finalists in 1984; UEFA Cup Winners' Cup: semi-finalists in 1990; quarter-finalists in 1989
Universitatea Craiova	European Cup/UEFA Champions League: quarter-finalists in 1982; UEFA Cup/UEFA Europa League: semi-finalists in 1983
Rapid București 1 final	UEFA Cup Winners' Cup: quarter-finalists in 1973; UEFA Cup/UEFA Europa League: quarter-finalists in 2006; Mitropa Cup: (1): finalists in 1940
FCSB	UEFA Cup/UEFA Europa League: semi-finalists in 2006
Petrolul Ploiești	Inter-Cities Fairs Cup: quarter-finalists in 1963
FCM Bacău	Inter-Cities Fairs Cup: quarter-finalists in 1970
UTA Arad	UEFA Cup/UEFA Europa League: quarter-finalists in 1972
Victoria București	UEFA Cup/UEFA Europa League: quarter-finalists in 1989
Vaslui 1 cup	UEFA Intertoto Cup (1): winners in 2008
Oțelul Galați 1 cup	UEFA Intertoto Cup (1): winners in 2007
CFR Cluj 1 final	UEFA Intertoto Cup (1): finalists in 2005
Farul Constanța 1 final	UEFA Intertoto Cup (1): finalists in 2006
Gloria Bistrița 1 final	UEFA Intertoto Cup (1): finalists in 2007

=== UEFA ranking ===
UEFA League Ranking for the period of 2020–2025:

- 23. (18) (Ukraine) Ukrainian Premier League
- 24. (24) (Hungary) Nemzeti Bajnokság I
- 25. (26) (Romania) Liga I
- 26. (22) (Russia) Russian Premier League
- 27. (29) (Slovakia) Slovak Super Liga

== See also ==
- Football records and statistics in Romania
- List of football clubs in Romania
- List of foreign Liga I players
