= Româno-Americană București =

- Full name: Româno-Americană București
- Short name: RAB
- Founded: 1906
- Dissolved: 1916

Româno-Americană București was a Romanian football club from Bucharest, south-east Romania, founded in 1906 and dissolved soon after, in 1916. It won one Romanian Championship in 1915.

== History ==
Româno-Americană FC was the first football club founded in Ploieşti, in 1906, under the name Societatea Româno-Americană (Romanian-American Society). The foundations were laid by American and Dutch functionaries from the oil companies from the Prahova Valley. In 1914 the club was moved to Bucharest and became champions of Romania at the end of the 1914–15 season.

On 2 December 1907, the club plays its first match, in Bucharest, on the "La Şosea" (By the Road) Field, against Olympia Bucharest, winning 7–1.

Româno-Americană's most important players, among others, were: Clive, Brazier, Llewellyn, Jack Catterall, Hans Horing, Alvirescu.

The club was dissolved in the spring of 1916.

== Honours ==
Liga I:

- Winners (1): 1914–15

== League history ==
Season	Tier	Division	Place	Notes
1915–16	—	Romanian Championship	—	Won the autumn Cupa Harwester undefeated; did not participate in the spring championship; club dissolved in 1916
1914–15	1	Romanian Championship	1st (C)	Champions of Romania; first and only national title
1906–14	—	Regional Championships	—	Club founded in 1906 in Ploiești as Societatea Româno-Americană
