= 1914–15 Divizia A =

6th season of Divizia A

Divizia A
- Season: 1914–15
- Champions: Româno-Americană

The 1914–15 Divizia A was the sixth season of Divizia A, the top-level football league of Romania.

== Final table ==
Pos	Team	Pld	W	D	L	GF	GA	GD	Pts
1	Româno-Americană (C)	10	8	2	0	31	4	+27	18
2	Colentina București	10	7	3	0	50	12	+38	17
3	Bukarester FC	10	5	1	4	15	15	0	11
4	Prahova Ploiești	10	4	0	6	20	29	−9	8
5	Colțea București	10	2	0	8	5	35	−30	4
6	Oltenia Craiova	10	1	0	9	6	32	−26	2

(C) Champions
