= 1913–14 Divizia A =

5th season of top-tier football league in Romania

Divizia A
- Season: 1913–14
- Champions: Colentina București

The 1913–14 Divizia A was the fifth season of Divizia A, the top-level football league of Romania.

== Final table ==
Pos	Team	Pld	W	D	L	GF	GA	GD	Pts
1	Colentina București (C)	2	2	0	0	7	0	+7	4
2	Bukarester FC	2	0	1	1	1	3	−2	1
3	Cercul Atletic București	2	0	1	1	1	6	−5	1
4	Olympia București	0	0	0	0	0	0	0	0

(C) Champions
