= 1910–11 Divizia A =

2nd season of top-tier football league in Romania

Divizia A
- Season: 1910–11
- Champions: Olympia București

The 1910–11 Divizia A was the second season of Divizia A, the top-level football league of Romania.

== Final table ==
Pos	Team	Pld	W	D	L	GF	GA	GD	Pts
1	Olympia București (C)	3	2	1	0	7	3	+4	5
2	United Ploiești	3	1	1	1	6	7	−1	3
3	Colentina București	2	0	0	2	3	6	−3	0

(C) Champions
