= 1911–12 Divizia A =

3rd season of top-tier football league in Romania

Divizia A
- Season: 1911–12
- Champions: United Ploiești

The 1911–12 Divizia A was the third season of Divizia A, the top-level football league of Romania.

== Final table ==
Pos	Team	Pld	W	D	L	GF	GA	GD	Pts
1	United Ploiești (C)	4	3	1	0	14	8	+6	7
2	Olympia București	4	1	1	2	10	13	−3	3
3	Colentina București	4	0	2	2	10	13	−3	2

(C) Champions
