= 1927–28 Divizia A =

16th season of Divizia A

Divizia A
- Season: 1927–28
- Champions: Colțea Brașov

The 1927–28 Divizia A was the sixteenth season of Divizia A, the top-level football league of Romania.

== Participating teams ==
Region	Team
Arad	Jiul Lupeni
Bucharest	Olympia București
Brașov	Colțea Brașov
Cernăuţi	Polonia Cernăuți
Chișinău	Mihai Viteazul Chișinău
Cluj	România Cluj
Craiova	Craiu Iovan Craiova
Galați	Dacia Vasile Alecsandri Galați
Iași	Concordia Iași
Oradea	Stăruința Oradea
Sibiu	Șoimii Sibiu
Timișoara	Chinezul Timișoara

== Final Tournament of Regions ==
=== Preliminary round ===
Team 1	Score	Team 2
Dacia Vasile Alecsandri Galați (Romania)	2–4	(Romania) Olympia București
România Cluj (Romania)	3–2	(Romania) Stăruința Oradea
Craiovan Craiova (Romania)	2–4	(Romania) Șoimii Sibiu
Mihai Viteazul Chișinău (Romania)	9–1	(Romania) Concordia Iași

=== Quarters ===
Team 1	Score	Team 2
Mihai Viteazul Chișinău (Romania)	5–2	(Romania) Polonia Cernăuți
Olympia București (Romania)	2–3	(Romania) Colțea Brașov
Șoimii Sibiu (Romania)	2–2	(Romania) Chinezul Timișoara
Șoimii Sibiu (Romania)	4–3	(Romania) Chinezul Timișoara
România Cluj (Romania)	0–2	(Romania) Jiul Lupeni

=== Semifinals ===
Team 1	Score	Team 2
Colțea Brașov (Romania)	6–4	(Romania) Mihai Viteazul Chișinău
Jiul Lupeni (Romania)	3–0^{1}	(Romania) Șoimii Sibiu

^{1} The team from Sibiu failed to appear, so it lost the game with 0–3, by administrative decision.

=== Final ===
19 July 1928

Colțea Brașov	3–2	Jiul Lupeni
Kemeny 29', 89'; Gebrovski 44'		Bognar 41'; Kilianovici 62'

Stadionul "Sub Straja", Brașov
Attendance: 7,000
Referee: Nagy Lajos

== Champion squad ==
Colțea Brașov

Goalkeepers: Loembel.
Defenders: Columban, Balint.
Midfielders:Török, Ioan Csajka, Adalbert Hrehuss.
Forwards: Peterfi, Hecht, Kemeny, Ion Gebrovski, Gruber.
(the players that played the final)
