= 1915–16 Divizia A =

7th season of top-tier football league in Romania

Divizia A
- Season: 1915–16
- Champions: Prahova Ploieşti

The 1915–16 Divizia A was the seventh season of Divizia A, the top-level football league of Romania.

== Final table ==
Pos	Team	Pld	W	D	L	GF	GA	GD	Pts
1	Prahova Ploiești (C)	6	5	0	1	17	2	+15	10
2	Bukarester FC	6	3	2	1	11	8	+3	8
3	Colțea București	6	0	3	3	3	13	−10	3
4	Colentina București	6	0	1	5	4	15	−11	1

(C) Champions
