= Olympia București =

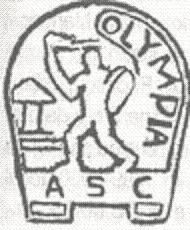
- Full name: Olympia București
- Short name: Olympia
- Founded: 1904
- Dissolved: 1946
- Ground: ACSA Stadium
Home colours	Away colours

Olympia București was a football club based in Bucharest, in southern Romania. It was founded in 1904 and it soon became one of the best teams in the country, winning two Romanian Championships. The club was dissolved in 1946.

== History ==
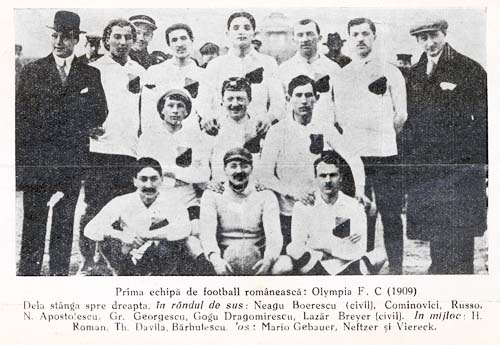
Olympia squad in 1909

The first football club from Bucharest, founded in October 1904 by young foreigners and a few Romanians from which we can mention: M. Gebauer, L. Breyer, Th. Davilla, the Grunberg brothers, prof. Ioanide, Szalay, Mendel. The club's first president was Mario Gebauer, Lazăr Breyer was the secretary, and capitan of the team Gh. Viereck. The football pitch was the one from Bolta rece (near the Triumphal arch today).

The team participated at the Herzog Cup along with Colentina București and United Ploieşti, a competition equivalent with the Romanian Championship, the predecessor of the Liga I. It succeeds to win the first two editions, in 1909–10 and 1910–11. Part of the team that participated at this performance: Gebauer – Hartman, Winter, L. Breyer, Davilla, Kemeny, Grunberg, Hart, Niculescu, Apostolescu, Bărbulescu (First 11). Beside them: Roman, Cominovici, Mincu, G. Vraca, C. Rădulescu, the Brebeţeanu brothers, the Volvoreanu brothers, Miti Niculescu, Şuţu, Drăghici, G. Dragomirescu, Ţane Săvulescu.

In 1915, the club fell apart, a part of the players go to rugby, and a part, in front with L. Breyer go to Colentina București.

After World War I, the club bounces back and starting with 1921 participates at the Bucharest Regional Championship. During the pre-divisionary period, the team succeeds only once to pass the regional phase, in 1927–28, and qualifies for the national championship, but reaches only the quarter-finals, being eliminated by Colţea Braşov (1–3). After the Romanian football passes to the divisionary system, the club plays for one season in Liga III in 1937–38 and for one season in Liga II in 1940–41.

After World War II, the club reappears in the Bucharest District Championship under the name of Olympia-Rheim, after which is dissolved, leaving behind the fame of the neighbourhood, of the ACSA (Belu) football pitch, inaugurated in 1927 and of three generation of players: First one, 1925–1937 with M. Cruţescu, E. Kroner, Robe, Subăşeanu, Taciuc; Second one, 1938–1944, with Sucitulescu, V. Stănescu, Catană, Panait, Ion Vasile, Aştilean, Gică Nicolae, Gain, Fabian, C. Rădulescu-Jumate, C. Siomionescu; And the third one (the last) we see: Voinescu I, Voinescu II, Al. Ene, Călinoiu, Titi Popescu, Ciocea, the Medrea brothers, Gheorghiu, Andreescu, Jipa.

== Honours ==
Liga I:

- Winners (2): 1909–10, 1910–11

== League history ==
Season	Tier	Division	Place	Notes
1945–46	—	Bucharest District Championship	—	Played as Olympia-Rheim; club dissolved in 1946
1941–45	Inactive because of World War II			
1940–41	2	Divizia B (Series III)	5th	
1939–40	—	Regional Championship (Bucharest)	—	Entered Divizia B the following season
1938–39	—	Regional Championship (Bucharest)	—	
1937–38	3	Divizia C (South League, Series I)	2nd	
1932–37	—	Regional Championship (Bucharest)	—	Competed outside the national divisions
1931–32	2	Bucharest Regional Championship	6th	
1930–31	2	Bucharest Regional Championship	3rd	
1929–30	2	Bucharest Regional Championship	3rd	
1928–29	2	Bucharest Regional Championship	3rd	
1927–28	1	Romanian Championship	Quarter-finals	Bucharest champions; eliminated 2–3 by Colțea Brașov
1926–27	2	Bucharest–Ploiești Regional Championship	6th	
1925–26	2	Bucharest–Ploiești Regional Championship	2nd	
1924–25	2	Bucharest–Ploiești Regional Championship	3rd	
1923–24	2	Bucharest–Ploiești Regional Championship	7th	
1922–23	2	Bucharest Regional Championship	3rd	Reached regional semi-finals
1921–22	2	Bucharest Regional Championship	—	Club re-established after World War I
1914–21	Inactive because of World War I			
1913–14	1	Romanian Championship	4th	Last published table; club was entering a period of dissolution
1912–13	1	Romanian Championship	5th	
1911–12	1	Romanian Championship	3rd	
1910–11	1	Romanian Championship	1st (C)	Champions of Romania
1909–10	1	Romanian Championship	1st (C)	Champions of Romania; inaugural Romanian championship
1904–09	Club founded in 1904; no official Romanian national league championship yet			
