= Colentina A.C. București =

Romanian football club

Colentina București
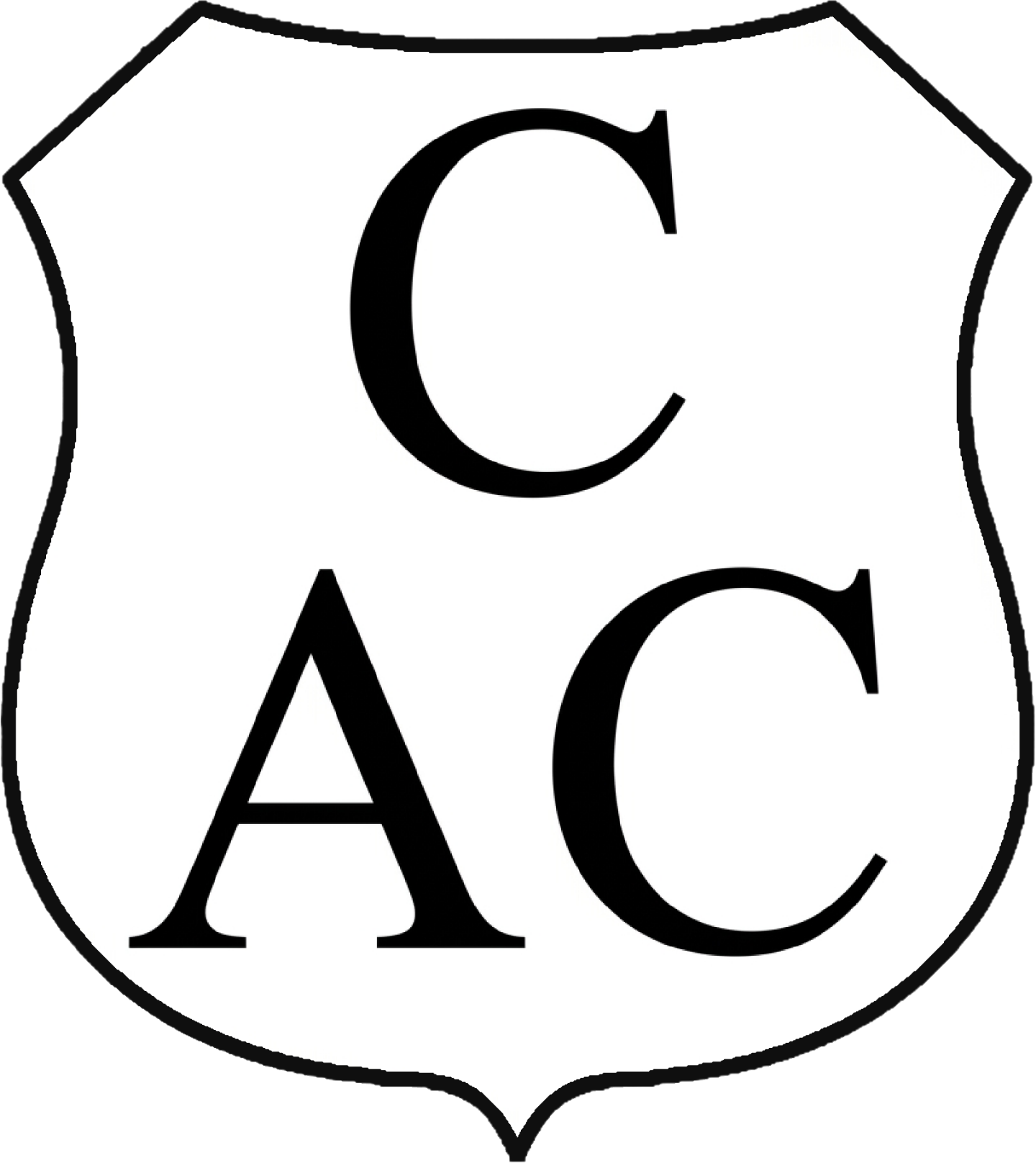
- Full name: Colentina A.C. București
- Short name: Colentina
- Founded: 1909
- Dissolved: 1947
Home colours	Away colours

Colentina A.C. București was a football club based in Bucharest, in southern Romania. It was founded in 1909 and it soon became one of the best teams in the country, winning two Romanian Championships The club was dissolved in 1947.

== History ==
The second club from Bucharest, founded in April 1909, represented the workers and clerks of the Colentina Cotton Factory, English society. The first president of the club was Mastejan, the factory president. The most famous players were: Matthews, Catteral, Middleton, Thompson, Deburst.

The club succeeds to win two consecutive editions of the Romanian Championship, before the First World War, in 1912–13 and 1913–14. Just before the outbreak of the war, the players, most of them English, leave the country and the team enters into a slow process of dissolution.

In 1915, a part of the members of Olympia București (then in a dissolution process) come to Colentina and the team manages to resist one more year.

After the War, the club activates in the Bucharest District Championship, and during the period before World War Two, the team appears a single time at a divisionary level, in 1946–1947 in Liga III. After this, there are no more records about the club's activity, in the end being dissolved.

== Honours ==
Liga I:

- Winners (2): 1912–13, 1913–14
- Runners-up (2): 1909–10, 1914–15

== League history ==
Season	Tier	Division	Place	Notes
1946–47	3	Divizia C (Series II)	8th	Dissolved
1919–46	—	Bucharest District Championship	—	Local football
1916–19	No championship because of World War I			
1915–16	1	Divizia A	4th	
1914–15	1	Divizia A	2nd	
1913–14	1	Divizia A	1st (C)	Champions
1912–13	1	Divizia A	1st (C)	Champions
1911–12	1	Divizia A	3rd	
1910–11	1	Divizia A	3rd	
1909–10	1	Divizia A	2nd	Founded

Champions
Runners-up
Third place
