= Athletics at the 1928 Summer Olympics – Men's marathon =

Men's marathon at the Games of the IX Olympiad
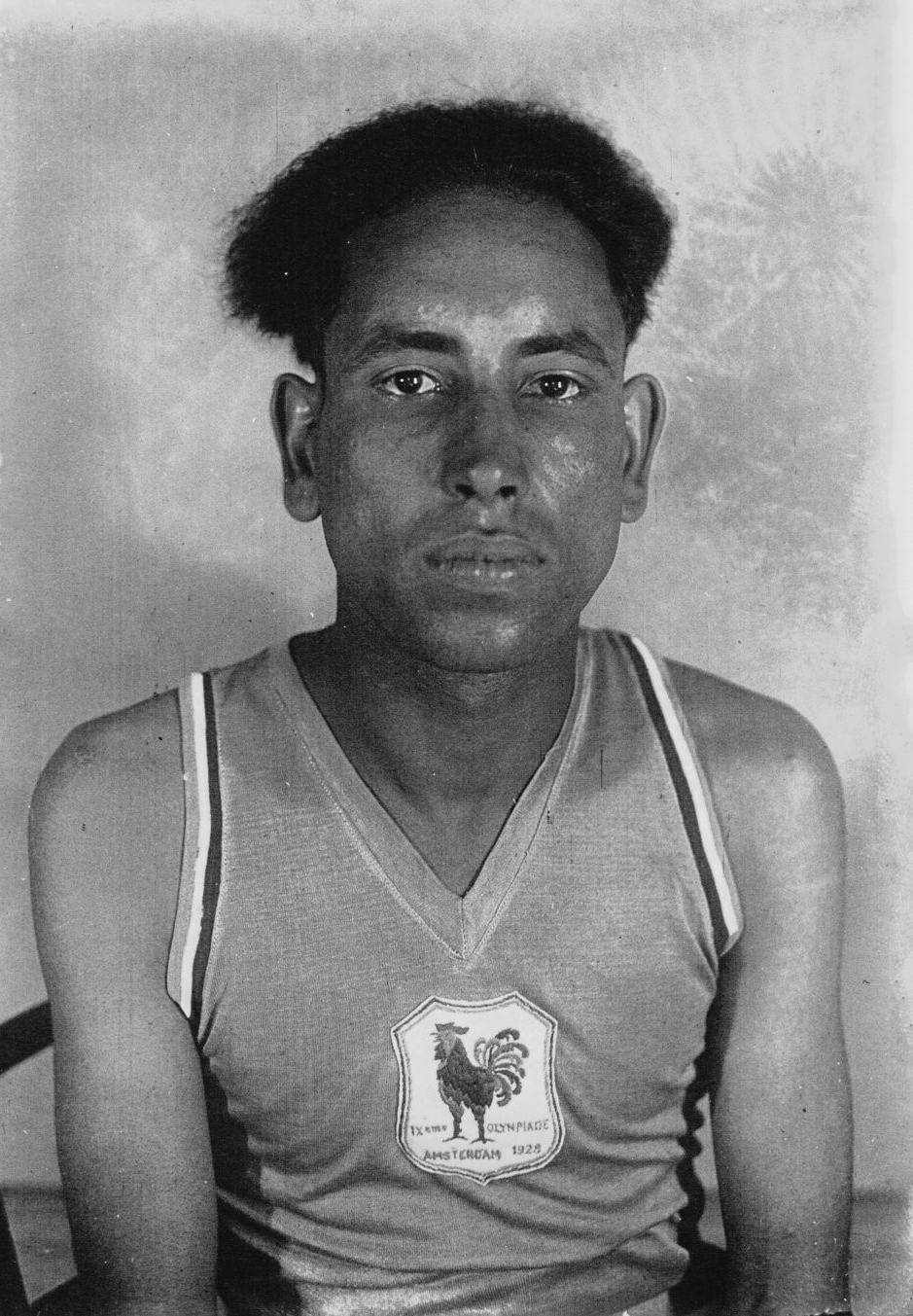
- Boughera El Ouafi, winner
- Venue: Olympisch Stadion, Amsterdam
- Dates: 5 August 1928
- Competitors: 69 from 23 nations
- Winning time: 2:32:57

Medalists
1st place, gold medalist(s)		Boughera El Ouafi	France
2nd place, silver medalist(s)		Manuel Plaza	Chile
3rd place, bronze medalist(s)		Martti Marttelin	Finland

The men's marathon at the 1928 Summer Olympics was held in Amsterdam, Netherlands on 5 August 1928. The race started at 15:14 local time. A total number of 57 athletes completed the race, with Willem van der Steen from the Netherlands finishing in last position in 3:29:21. There were 69 competitors from 23 countries. Twelve of them did not finish. The maximum number of athletes per nation was 6. The event was won by Boughera El Ouafi of France, the nation's first Olympic marathon victory since 1900 (and second overall). Manuel Plaza's silver made him the first Olympic medalist from Chile, while Martti Marttelin's bronze put Finland on the podium in the event for the third straight Games.

== Background ==
This was the eighth appearance of the event, which is one of 12 athletics events to have been held at every Summer Olympics. Returning runners from 1924 included silver medalist Romeo Bertini of Italy, bronze medalist Clarence DeMar of the United States, fifth-place finisher Sam Ferris of Great Britain, sixth-place finisher Manuel Plaza of Chile, seventh-place finisher Boughera El Ouafi of France, and eighth-place finisher Gustav Kinn of Sweden. The field "was very open with no strict favorite."

Latvia, Mexico, Romania, and Yugoslavia each made their first appearance in Olympic marathons. The United States made its eighth appearance, the only nation to have competed in each Olympic marathon to that point.

== Competition format ==
As all Olympic marathons, the competition was a single race. The now-standard marathon distance of 26 miles, 385 yards was run over a course that "started and ended at the Olympic Stadium, but was not strictly out-and-back, as there were small loops near the halfway point, and on the return to the Stadium."

== Records ==
Prior to this competition, the existing world and Olympic records were as follows.

World record	Albert Michelsen (USA)	2:29:01.8	Port Chester, United States	12 October 1925
Olympic record	Hannes Kolehmainen (FIN)	2:32:35.8(*)	Antwerp, Belgium	22 August 1920

(*) Course was list at 42.75 kilometres.

== Schedule ==
Date	Time	Round
Sunday, 5 August 1928	15:14	Final

== Results ==
Rank	Athlete	Nation	Time
1st place, gold medalist(s)	Boughera El Ouafi	France	2:32:57
2nd place, silver medalist(s)	Manuel Plaza	Chile	2:33:23
3rd place, bronze medalist(s)	Martti Marttelin	Finland	2:35:02
4	Kanematsu Yamada	Japan	2:35:29
5	Joie Ray	United States	2:36:04
6	Seiichiro Tsuda	Japan	2:36:20
7	Yrjö Korholin-Koski	Finland	2:36:40
8	Sam Ferris	Great Britain	2:37:41
9	Albert Michelsen	United States	2:38:56
10	Clifford Bricker	Canada	2:39:24
11	Harry Wood	Great Britain	2:41:15
12	Verner Laaksonen	Finland	2:41:35
13	Harry Payne	Great Britain	2:42:39
14	Eino Rastas	Finland	2:43:08
15	Väinö Sipilä	Finland	2:43:08
16	Alois Krof	Czechoslovakia	2:43:18
17	Johnny Miles	Canada	2:43:32
18	Léon Broers	Belgium	2:44:37
19	Hans Stelges	Germany	2:45:27
20	Dunky Wright	Great Britain	2:45:30
21	Herbert Bignall	Great Britain	2:45:44
22	Ernest Harper	Great Britain	2:45:44
23	Jean Gérault	France	2:46:08
24	Ilmari Kuokka	Finland	2:46:34
25	Gustav Kinn	Sweden	2:47:35
26	Silas McLellan	Canada	2:49:33
27	Clarence DeMar	United States	2:50:42
28	Marcel Denis	France	2:51:15
29	Guillaume Tell	France	2:51:18
30	Henri Landheer	Netherlands	2:51:59
31	Paul Hempel	Germany	2:52:01
32	Aurelio Terrazas	Mexico	2:52:22
33	František Zyka	Czechoslovakia	2:52:42
34	Giuseppe Ferrera	Italy	2:53:10
35	José Torres	Mexico	2:54:00
36	Johan Støa	Norway	2:54:15
37	Gerard Steuers	Belgium	2:54:48
38	Artūrs Motmillers	Latvia	2:56:45
39	James Henigan	United States	2:56:50
40	Matthew Steytler	South Africa	2:57:21
41	Harvey Frick	United States	2:57:24
42	Jean Linssen	Belgium	2:58:08
43	Frank Hughes	Canada	2:58:12
44	William Agee	United States	2:58:50
45	Percy Wyer	Canada	2:58:52
46	Georg Hoerger	Germany	2:59:01
47	Kurt Schneider	Germany	2:59:36
48	Juichi Nagatani	Japan	3:03:34
49	József Galambos	Hungary	3:05:58
50	Paul Gerhardt	Germany	3:09:30
51	Gottlieb Bach	Denmark	3:10:10
52	Emilio Ferrer	Spain	3:11:05
53	Dimitrije Stefanović	Yugoslavia	3:11:35
54	Joop Vermeulen	Netherlands	3:13:47
55	Pleun van Leenen	Netherlands	3:14:37
56	Jean Marien	Belgium	3:16:13
57	Willem van der Steen	Netherlands	3:19:53
—	Axel Elofs	Sweden	DNF
—	Aksel Madsen	Denmark	DNF
—	Orla Olsen	Denmark	DNF
—	Vintilă Cristescu	Romania	DNF
—	Romeo Bertini	Italy	DNF
—	Attilio Conton	Italy	DNF
—	Stefano Natale	Italy	DNF
—	Vilis Cimmermans	Latvia	DNF
—	Karl Laas	Estonia	DNF
—	Teun Sprong	Netherlands	DNF
—	Bram Groeneweg	Netherlands	DNF
—	Franz Wanderer	Germany	DNF
—	Seghir Beddari	France	DNS
—	Kārlis Bukass	Latvia	DNS
—	Dionisio Carreras	Spain	DNS
—	Pál Király	Hungary	DNS
—	Antal Lovas	Hungary	DNS
—	O. Molina	Chile	DNS
—	L. Nicolas	France	DNS
—	Henry Nielsen	Denmark	DNS
—	Karel Šťastný	Czechoslovakia	DNS
—	Harold Webster	Canada	DNS
