= Košice Peace Marathon =

Annual race in Slovakia held since 1924

- Date: October
- Location: Košice, Slovakia
- Event type: Road
- Distance: Marathon
- Primary sponsor: Nippon Steel Slovakia, Volvo Cars
- Established: 1924 (102 years ago)
- Course records: Men's: 2:06:47 (2025) (Kenya) Moses Kemei; Women's: 2:21:08 (2024) (Kenya) Rebecca Tanui
- Website: Official website
- Participants: 2,079 male and 385 female finishers (2026)

The Košice Peace Marathon (Slovak: Medzinárodný maratón mieru) is an annual road marathon held in Košice, Slovakia, since 1924. It is the oldest continuously running in the world, having been run every year since 1941. It is the oldest marathon in Europe and the third-oldest in the world (after the Boston Marathon, first held in 1897, and the Yonkers Marathon, first held in 1907). However, Boston and Yonkers have been continuous only since 2021. The marathon generally takes place each year on the first Sunday in October. The course is relatively flat and consists of two loops, mostly within the city center.

The marathon is an AIMS-certified race. It is also categorized as a Silver Label Road Race by World Athletics, and was certified as a 5-Star Quality Road Race by European Athletics Running for All in 2015.

== History ==
The Košice Peace Marathon, first held in 1924, is the oldest marathon in Europe and the third oldest in the world. Inspired by the 1924 Paris Olympics, Košice sports enthusiast Vojtech (born Braun) Bukovský organized the inaugural race, which began beneath the ruins of Turňa Castle. The marathon quickly gained international prestige, attracting prominent athletes like 1931 winner Juan Carlos Zabala, who went on to win the 1932 Olympic marathon. Known for its adherence to the official marathon distance of 42.195 km, even in its early years, the race has hosted numerous world-class runners and witnessed historic performances, including Abebe Bikila's victory in 1961. The Košice Peace Marathon has endured through war and societal change, adapting its course and expanding to include women in 1980.

In 2016, the marathon received IAAF Bronze Label Road Race status, and in 2018, it received IAAF Silver Label Road Race status.

== Course ==
External image
- Course map of full marathon in 2020

The course is flat, completely asphalted and traffic free, two laps in the historic city center.

The cumulative elevation gain is 74 m (243 ft).

== Winners ==
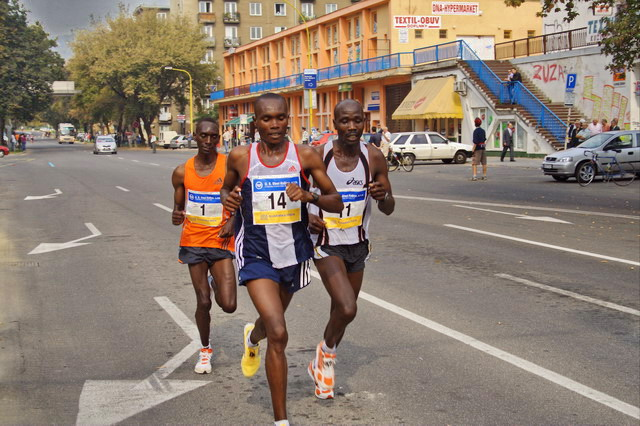
Runners at the 2006 edition

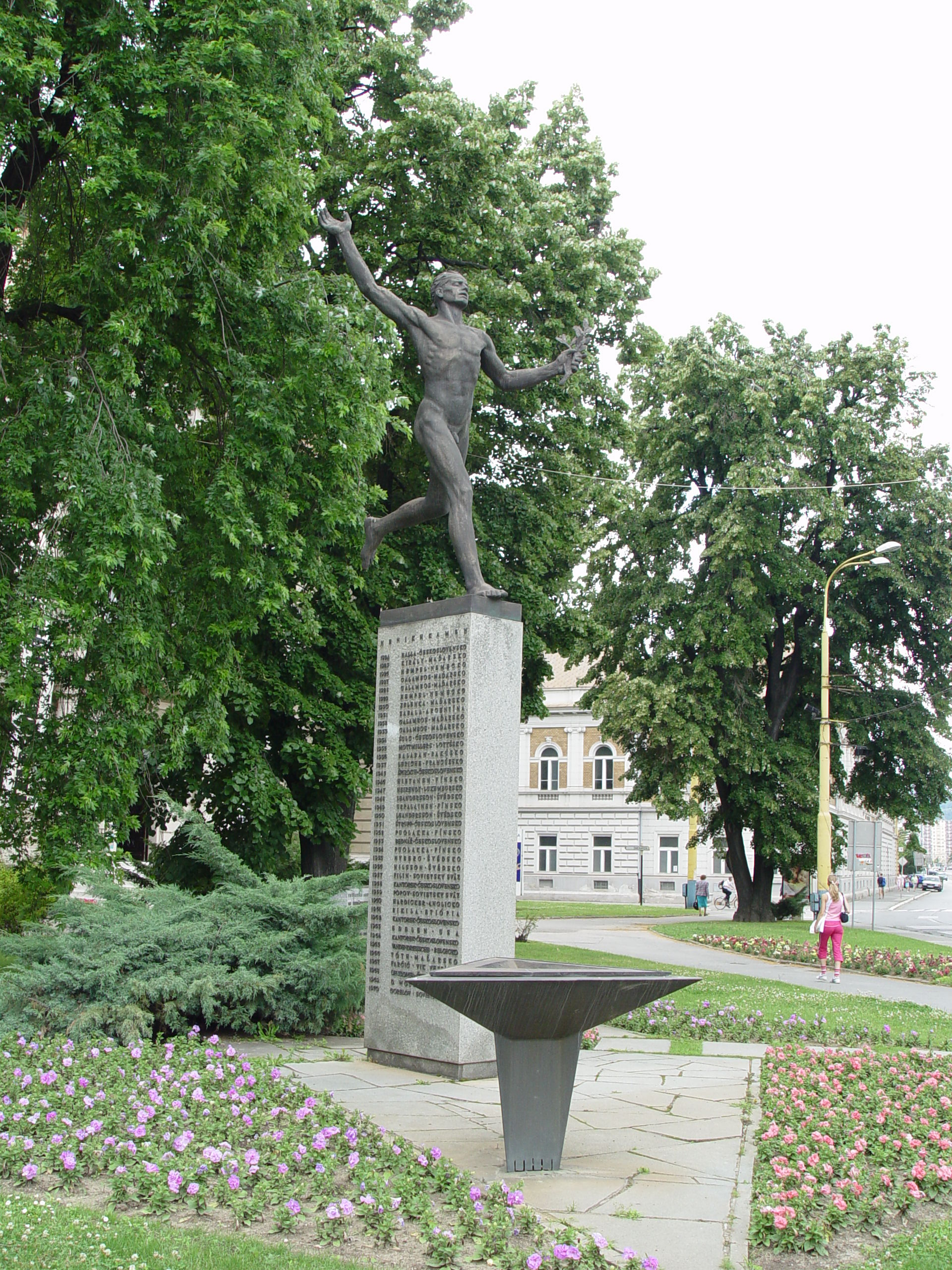
Memorial of the Košice Peace Marathon at the Marathon Square in Košice, Slovakia

The course records are 2:21:08 for women (set by Rebecca Tanui in 2024) and 2:06:47 hours for men (set by Moses Kemei in 2025).

Note: winners are listed below for five of the seven war years (1938–44), five war winners are listed at official homepage too, although the history provided by the Košice Peace Marathon states: "The Slovakian Marathon suffered a cleft seven years wide. To some extent this was patched up with five marathons organized under the Hungarian flag during the Horthy occupation of Košice – without a single foreign runner..." Its status as the oldest marathon in Europe, and second-oldest in the world, remains undiminished by this break.

Key: Course record (in bold)

Ed.	Year	Men's winner	Time	Women's winner	Time	Rf.
1	1924	Karol Halla (TCH)	3:01:35	not held		
2	1925	Pál Király (HUN)	2:41:55	not held		
3	1926	Paul Hempel (GER)	2:57:02	not held		
4	1927	József Galambos (HUN)	2:48:25.2	not held		
5	1928	József Galambos (HUN)	2:55:45	not held		
6	1929	Paul Hempel (GER)	2:51:31	not held		
7	1930	Istvàn Zelenka (HUN)	2:50:59	not held		
8	1931	Juan Carlos Zabala (ARG)	2:33:19	not held		
9	1932	József Galambos (HUN)	2:43:15	not held		
10	1933	József Galambos (HUN)	2:37:54	not held		
11	1934	Josef Šulc (TCH)	2:41:26.3	not held		
12	1935	Artūrs Motmillers (LAT)	2:44:58	not held		
13	1936	György Balaban (AUT)	2:41:08	not held		
14	1937	Désiré Leriche (FRA)	2:43:41.7	not held		
15	1938	not held due to World War II		not held		
16	1939	József Kiss (HUN)	2:47:47.6	not held		
17	1940	not held due to World War II		not held		
18	1941	József Gyimesi (HUN)	2:56:17.8	not held		
19	1942	József Kiss (HUN)	3:02:27	not held		
20	1943	Géza Kiss (HUN)	2:50:14.0	not held		
21	1944	Rezsö Kövári (HUN)	2:58:49	not held		
22	1945	Antonín Špiroch (TCH)	2:47:21.8	not held		
23	1946	Mikko Hietanen (FIN)	2:35:02.4	not held		
24	1947	Charles Heirendt (LUX)	2:36:06.0	not held		
25	1948	Gösta Leandersson (SWE)	2:34:46.4	not held		
26	1949	Martti Urpalainen (FIN)	2:33:45.6	not held		
27	1950	Gösta Leandersson (SWE)	2:31:20.2	not held		
28	1951	Jaroslav Štrupp (TCH)	2:41:07.8	not held		
29	1952	Erkki Puolakka (FIN)	2:29:10	not held		
30	1953	Walter Bednář (TCH)	2:53:33	not held		
31	1954	Erkki Puolakka (FIN)	2:27:21	not held		
32	1955	Evert Nyberg (SWE)	2:25:40	not held		
33	1956	Thomas Nilsson (SWE)	2:22:05.4	not held		
34	1957	Ivan Filin (URS)	2:23:57.8	not held		
35	1958	Pavel Kantorek (TCH)	2:29:37.2	not held		
36	1959	Sergei Popov (URS)	2:17:45.2	not held		
37	1960	Samuel Hardicker (GBR)	2:26:46.8	not held		
38	1961	Abebe Bikila (ETH)	2:20:12.0	not held		
39	1962	Pavel Kantorek (TCH)	2:28:29.8	not held		
40	1963	Leonard Edelen (USA)	2:15:09.6	not held		
41	1964	Pavel Kantorek (TCH)	2:25:55.4	not held		
42	1965	Aurèle Vandendriessche (BEL)	2:23:47	not held		
43	1966	Gyula Tóth (HUN)	2:19:11.2	not held		
44	1967	Nedo Farčić (YUG)	2:20:53.8	not held		
45	1968	Václav Chudomel (TCH)	2:26:28.4	not held		
46	1969	Demissie Wolde (ETH)	2:15:37	not held		
47	1970	Mikhail Gorelov (URS)	2:16:26.2	not held		
48	1971	Gyula Tóth (HUN)	2:21:43.6	not held		
49	1972	John Farrington (AUS)	2:17:34.4	not held		
50	1973	Vladimir Moseyev (URS)	2:19:01.2	not held		
51	1974	Keith Angus (GBR)	2:20:10	not held		
52	1975	Choe Chang-sop (PRK)	2:15:47.8	not held		
53	1976	Takeshi So (JPN)	2:18:42.4	not held		
54	1977	Go Chun-son (PRK)	2:15:19.4	not held		
55	1978	Go Chun-son (PRK)	2:13:34.5	not held		
56	1979	Jouni Kortelainen (FIN)	2:15:12	not held		
57	1980	Aleksey Lyagushev (URS)	2:15:25	Šárka Balcarová (TCH)	2:50:15	
58	1981	Hans-Joachim Truppel (GDR)	2:16:58	Christa Vahlensieck (FRG)	2:37:46	
59	1982	György Sinkó (HUN)	2:18:48	Gillian Burley (GBR)	2:43:26	
60	1983	František Višnický (TCH)	2:16:52	Raisa Sadreydinova (URS)	2:34:41	
61	1984	Lee Dong-myong (PRK)	2:18:59	Christa Vahlensieck (FRG)	2:36:56	
62	1985	Valentin Starikov (URS)	2:17:13	Lutsia Belyayeva (URS)	2:38:19	
63	1986	František Višnický (TCH)	2:18:43	Christa Vahlensieck (FRG)	2:41:08	
64	1987	Jörg Peter (GDR)	2:14:59	Christa Vahlensieck (FRG)	2:38:40	
65	1988	Michael Heilmann (GDR)	2:17:52	Christa Vahlensieck (FRG)	2:39:03	
66	1989	Karel David (TCH)	2:18:39	Alena Peterková (TCH)	2:31:28	
67	1990	Nikolaj Kolesnikov (URS)	2:20:28	Carol McLatchie (USA)	2:46:00	
68	1991	Vlastimil Bukovjan (TCH)	2:18:21	Marika Starowská (TCH)	2:46:00	
69	1992	Wieslaw Palczyński (POL)	2:16:24	Dana Hajná (TCH)	2:43:27	
70	1993	Wieslaw Palczyński (POL)	2:14:11	Elena Plastinina (UKR)	2:42:11	
71	1994	Petr Pipa (SVK)	2:15:03	Ľudmila Melicherová (SVK)	2:40:27	
72	1995	Marnix Goegebeur (BEL)	2:13:57	Gouzel Tazetdinova (RUS)	2:43:03	
73	1996	Marnix Goegebeur (BEL)	2:17:41	Gouzel Tazetdinova (RUS)	2:44:28	
74	1997	My Tahar Echchadli (MAR)	2:16:22	Wioletta Uryga (POL)	2:38:56	
75	1998	Andrzej Krzyścin (POL)	2:14:29	Wioletta Uryga (POL)	2:46:23	
76	1999	Róbert Štefko (SVK)	2:14:10	Katarína Jedináková (SVK)	2:55:39	
77	2000	Ernest Kipyego (KEN)	2:14:35	Ivana Martincová (CZE)	2:46:17	
78	2001	David Kariuki (KEN)	2:13:27	Galina Zhulyeva (UKR)	2:36:55	
79	2002	David Kariuki (KEN)	2:12:40	Tadelesh Birra (ETH)	2:36:49	
80	2003	Grigoriy Andreyev (RUS)	2:13:24	Alena Mazouka (BLR)	2:39:23	
81	2004	Adam Dobrzyński (POL)	2:12:35	Rika Tabashi (JPN)	2:33:52	
82	2005	David Maiyo (KEN)	2:16:07	Edyta Lewandowska (POL)	2:37:48	
83	2006	Edwin Kiptum (KEN)	2:12:53	Natallia Kravets-Kulesh (BLR)	2:36:47	
84	2007	William Biama (KEN)	2:09:53	Natallia Kravets-Kulesh (BLR)	2:34:50	
85	2008	Dejene Yirdaw (ETH)	2:10:51	Selina Chelimo (KEN)	2:34:23	
86	2009	Jacob Chesire (KEN)	2:10:59	Olena Burkovska (UKR)	2:30:50	
87	2010	Gilbert Chepkwony (KEN)	2:08:33	Almaz Alemu (ETH)	2:36:35	
88	2011	Elijah Kemboi (KEN)	2:11:15	Maryna Damantsevich (BLR)	2:33:53	
89	2012	Lawrence Kimaiyo (KEN)	2:07:01	Hellen Mugo (KEN)	2:29:59	
90	2013	Patrick Korir (KEN)	2:09:36	Ashete Bekere (ETH)	2:27:44	
91	2014	Gilbert Chepkwony (KEN)	2:08:26	Lydia Jerotich (KEN)	2:28:48	
92	2015	Samuel Kosgei (KEN)	2:07:07	Melka Mulu (ETH)	2:35:33	
93	2016	David Kiyeng (KEN)	2:08:57	Chaltu Waka (ETH)	2:32:19	
94	2017	Reuben Kerio (KEN)	2:08:12	Sheila Jerotich (KEN)	2:27:34	
95	2018	Raymond Choge (KEN)	2:08:11	Milliam Ebongon (KEN)	2:27:16	
96	2019	Hillary Kipsambu (KEN)	2:09:33	Kumeshi Sichala (ETH)	2:26:01	
97	2020	Marek Hladík (SVK)	2:26:08	Petra Pastorová (CZE)	2:52:11	
98	2021	Reuben Kerio (KEN)	2:07:18	Ayuntu Tadesse (ETH)	2:24:35	
99	2022	Reuben Kerio (KEN)	2:07:16	Margaret Agai (KEN)	2:24:04	
100	2023	Philemon Rono (KEN)	2:06:55	Jackline Cherono (KEN)	2:24:43	
101	2024	Denis Chirchir (KEN)	2:07:50	Rebecca Tanui (KEN)	**2:21:08**	
102	2025	Moses Kemei (KEN)	**2:06:47**	Balemlay Shumet (ETH)	2:21:59	
103	2026	Adam Lipschitz (RSA)	2:07:22	Aberash Fayesa (ETH)	2:21:55	
