= Deaths in September 1984 =

The following is a list of notable deaths in September 1984.

Entries for each day are listed alphabetically by surname. A typical entry lists information in the following sequence:

- Name, age, country of citizenship at birth, subsequent country of citizenship (if applicable), reason for notability, cause of death (if known), and reference.

== September 1984 ==
=== 1 ===
- Madeleine de Bourbon-Busset, 86, Duchess of Parma
- Howland Chamberlain, 73, American actor

=== 2 ===
- Vannie Albanese, 71, American football player with the Brooklyn Dodgers
- Malcolm Craven, 68, English motorcycle speedway rider
- Amir Gilboa, 66, Israeli poet
- Sergey Martinson, 85, Soviet and Russian actor
- Eino Purje, 84, Finnish runner

=== 3 ===
- Rolf Gammleng, 86, Norwegian violinist and organizational leader
- Manos Katrakis, 76, Greek actor
- Cecil Middleton, 73, English first-class cricketer
- Francis Moncreiff, 77, Scottish Episcopalian and Anglican bishop
- Gaston Palewski, 83, French politician
- August Rieger, 70, Austrian screenwriter and film director
- Arthur Schwartz, 83, American composer and film producer
- Francesco Tabai, 76, Italian male long, triple jumper, decathlete, and Olympian
- Herman Vanderpoorten, 62, Belgian liberal politician
- Wilhelm Winkler, 100, Czech-Austrian statistician and politician

=== 4 ===
- Fedir Bohatyrchuk, 91, Ukrainian–Canadian chess player, doctor of medicine (radiologist), political activist, and writer
- Elsie Louisa Deacon, 87, British draughtswoman
- Bjarne Johnsen, 92, Norwegian gymnast and Olympic gold medalist
- Ernst Stueckelberg, 79, Swiss mathematician and physicist

=== 5 ===
- Jack Davies, 74, Australian rugby league footballer
- Leonid Kostandov, 68, Soviet engineer and politician
- Boris Kuznetsov, 80, Soviet philosopher and historian
- Adam Malik, 67, 3rd Vice President of Indonesia, cancer
- Jane Roberts, 55, American author and poet, self-proclaimed psychic and a spirit medium, protein depletion, osteomyelitis, and soft-tissue infections caused by long-term rheumatoid arthritis

=== 6 ===
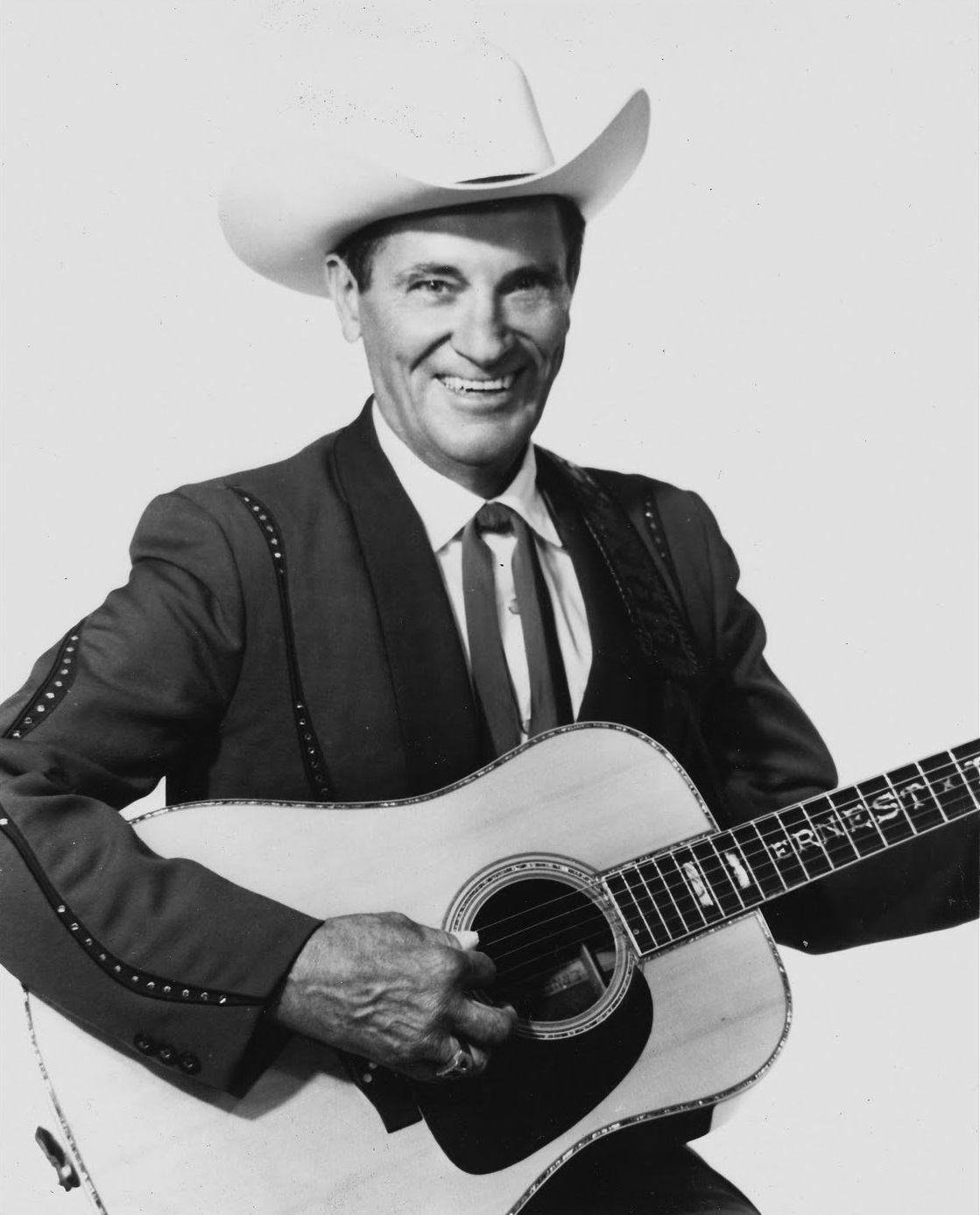
Ernest Tubb

- E. J. André, 76, American writer, director, and actor, cancer
- Donny MacLeod, 52, Scottish television presenter, heart attack after a short struggle with bowel cancer.
- Ernest Tubb, 70, American singer and songwriter, pioneer of country music and influential in popularizing the honky-tonk style of music, emphysema

=== 7 ===
- Frédéric Adam, 80, French conductor, composer and administrator
- Joe Cronin, 77, American professional baseball player, manager and executive, prostate cancer and bone cancer
- Archibald Gordon, 5th Marquess of Aberdeen and Temair, 71, English broadcaster, author and Scottish peer
- Liam O'Flaherty, 88, Irish novelist and short-story writer, founding member of the Communist Party of Ireland

=== 8 ===
- W. B. Makuloluwa, 62, Sri Lankan composer and theatre director

=== 9 ===
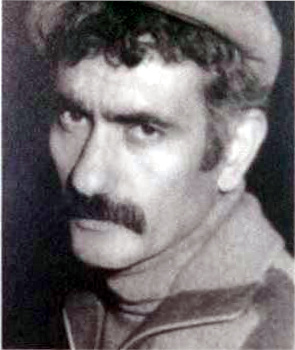
Yılmaz Güney

- Yılmaz Güney, 47, Turkish film director, screenwriter, novelist, and communist political activist, gastric cancer
- Ted Mapes, 82, American character actor, stuntman, body double, and animal safety observer for the American Humane Association
- Margaret Phillips, 61, Welsh actress, founding member of the Actors Studio, cancer

=== 10 ===
- Ismael Merlo, 66, Spanish actor
- Bhola Paswan Shastri, 69, Indian independence activist and politician
- Ramanujan Srinivasan, 46, Indian physicist

=== 11 ===
- Iskaq Tjokrohadisurjo, 88, Indonesian politician and advocate

=== 12 ===
- Lola Anglada, c. 90, Spanish writer, comics artist, and illustrator
- László Bánhidi, 78, Hungarian actor
- Lloyd Hales, 63, English cricketer
- Geoffrey Lloyd, Baron Geoffrey-Lloyd, 82, British politician
- Yvon Petra, 68, French tennis player

=== 13 ===
- Magdalena Avietėnaitė, 91, Lithuanian journalist, diplomat and a public figure
- Akio Chiba, 41, Japanese manga artist
- Daniel Aloysius Riley, 68, Canadian politician
- Henk Lotgering, 81, Dutch diver and Olympian
- Fano Shimasaki, 70, American Samoan chief, civil servant, clergyman and politician
- Laura Solari, 71, Italian film actress
- Lois White, 80, New Zealand painter of the modernist school

=== 14 ===
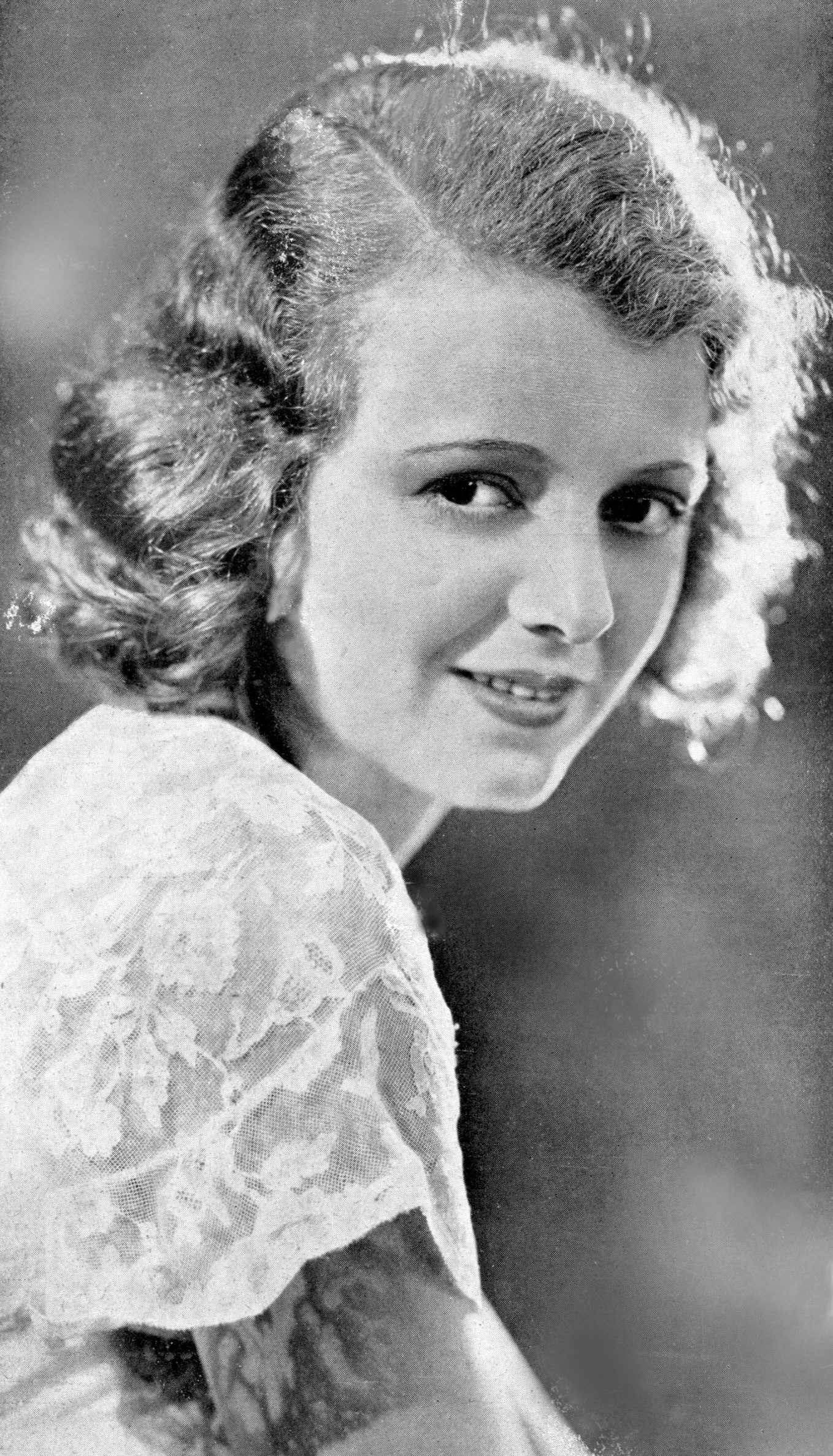
Janet Gaynor

- Richard Brautigan, American author (b. 1935)
- Janet Gaynor, 77, American actress

=== 15 ===
- Richard Clayton, 59, Commander-in-Chief Naval Home Command
- Clive Evatt, 84, Australian politician, barrister and raconteur
- Jack Ikin, 66, English cricketer
- Nasser bin Abdulaziz Al Saud, 72 or 73, Saudi Arabian businessman and politician

=== 16 ===
- Richard Brautigan, 49, American novelist and short-story writer, suicide by a self-inflicted .44 Magnum gunshot wound to the head. His decomposed body was located by a private investigator on October 25, 1984.
- Frank Cucksey, 65, American actor, singer, and circus performer, former host and ringmaster for the Ringling Bros. and Barnum & Bailey Circus and the Circus Hall of Fame

=== 17 ===
- John Anderson, 70, New Zealand rugby league footballer
- Richard Basehart, 70, American actor, series of strokes
- Gian Carlo Fusco, Italian writer, journalist, screenwriter, and actor
- Louis Roels, 72, a Belgian racing cyclist
- Yuri Vizbor, 50, Soviet actor, bard and poet

=== 18 ===
- Ralph Assheton, 1st Baron Clitheroe, 83, English aristocrat and politician
- Paavo Hietala, 64, Finnish wrestler
- Riccardo Lombardi, 83, Italian politician

=== 19 ===
- June Preisser, 66, American actress, teacher of both dancing and acrobatics, fatally injured in a car accident caused by rainy weather
- Stan Vanderbeek, 57, American independent animator, experimental filmmaker, and art theoretician

=== 20 ===
- Steve Goodman, 36, American folk and country singer-songwriter, leukemia

=== 21 ===
- Roberto de Leonardis, 71, Italian film script translator, film dialogue writer and film lyricist

=== 22 ===
- George Oliver, 95, British engineer, barrister and politician
- Aurelio Terrazas, 80, Mexican long-distance runner who was the first Rarámuri athlete to compete at the Olympics

=== 23 ===
- Zorro Aguilar, 42, Filipino human rights lawyer, activist, and newspaper editor, murdered

=== 24 ===
- Neil Hamilton, American actor (b. 1899)

=== 25 ===
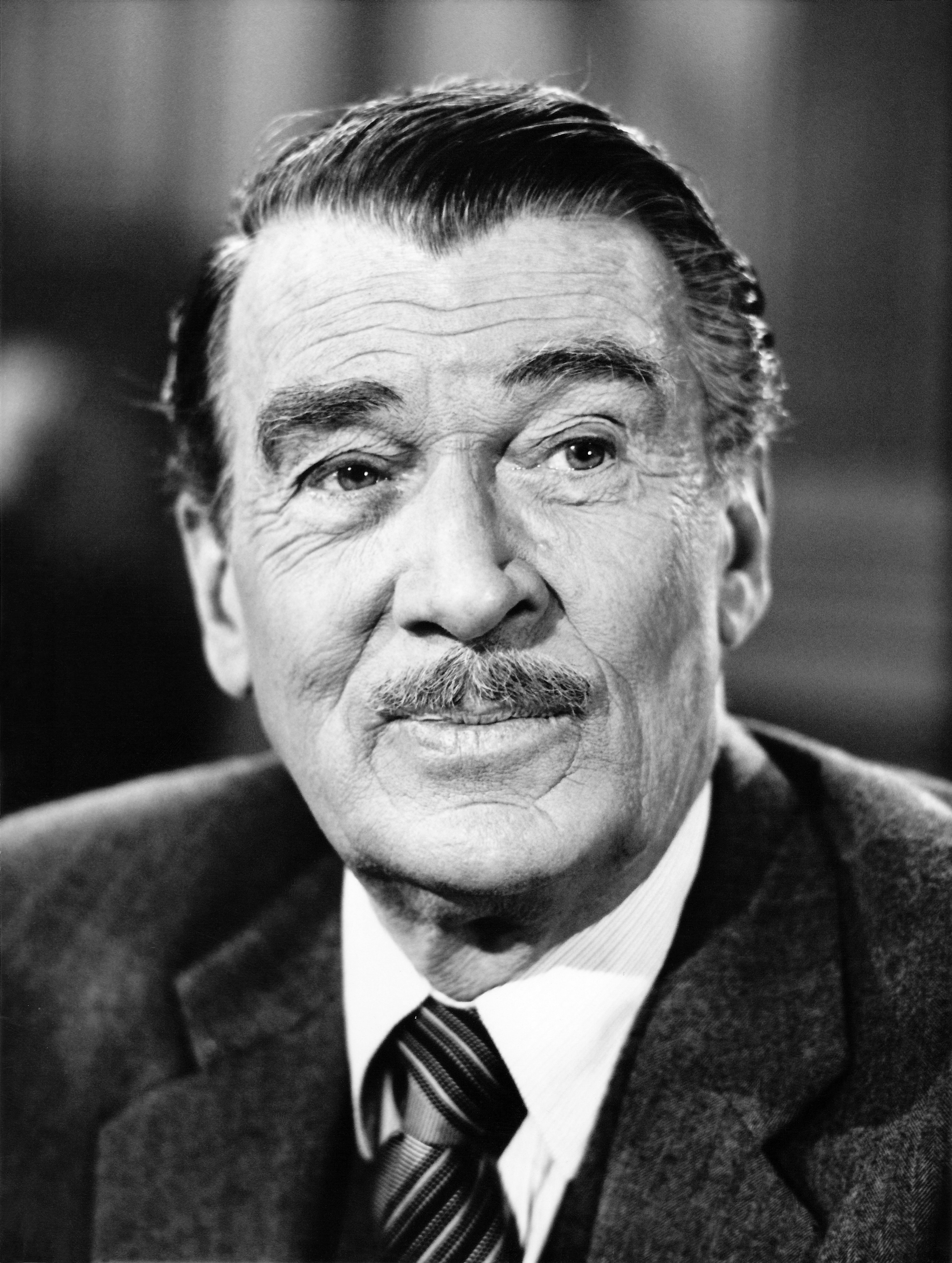
Walter Pidgeon

- Laverne Harding, 78, American animator and cartoonist, among the earliest women animators and one of only 9 women to have received a Winsor McCay Award, designed the version of Woody Woodpecker that was in use from 1950 to 1998.
- Walter Pidgeon, 87, Canadian-American actor, series of strokes

=== 26 ===
- John Facenda, 71, American sports commentator, narrator for NFL Films, cancer
- Shelly Manne, 64, American jazz drummer, heart attack

=== 27 ===
- Ernesto Alciati, 81, Italian long-distance runner
- Ubaldo Lay, 67, Italian actor, cerebral hemorrhage.
- Toke Townley, 71, English actor.

=== 28 ===
- Akhter Mia, 64, Bangladeshi politician
- Gerard Wallop, 9th Earl of Portsmouth, 86, British landowner, writer on agricultural topics, and politician

=== 29 ===
- Marnix Gijsen, 84, Belgian writer
- Mary Newland, 81, English actress
- Hal Porter, 73, Australian novelist, playwright, poet, and short story writer

=== 30 ===
- Clete Roberts, 72, American broadcast journalist, heart and respiratory failure following a surgery for brain aneurysm

== Sources ==
- Armour, Mark (2010). Joe Cronin: A Life in Baseball. University of Nebraska Press. ISBN 0803229968.
- Brand, Jack. Shelly Manne: Sounds of the Different Drummer (Discography and filmography by Bill Korst) (Percussion Express, 1997)
