= Alois Krof =

Czech long-distance runner

Personal information
- Nationality: Czech
- Born: 8 July 1903
- Died: 1935 (aged 31–32)

Sport
- Country: Czechoslovakia
- Sport: Long-distance running
- Event: Marathon

Alois Krof (8 July 1903 – 1935) was a Czech long-distance runner. He competed for Czechoslovakia in the marathon at the 1928 Summer Olympics.

In 1927, Krof was Czechoslovakia's national marathon champion and finished second, behind Hungary's József Galambos, in the Košice Peace Marathon (founded 1924), which Galambos won four times between 1927 and 1933.
