= Catherine Cherotich =

Kenyan long-distance and marathon runner

Personal information
- Full name: Catherine Cherotich
- Nationality: Kenyan
- Born: October 17, 1994 (age 31)

Sport
- Sport: Athletics
- Events: Marathon, Half marathon, 10,000 metres

Catherine Cherotich (born 17 October 1994) is a Kenyan long-distance runner specializing in marathon and road races. She has earned victories and podium finishes at major European marathons, including in Munich and Vienna.

== Career ==
Cherotich won the 2023 Munich Marathon in a time of 2:31:34. The race saw an all-Kenyan women's podium, and although confusion due to a detour near the finish impacted several athletes, she held onto the lead.

In April 2024, she improved her marathon personal best to 2:22:42 at the Frankfurt Marathon.

Cherotich secured another major podium in April 2025 at the Vienna City Marathon, placing third with an unofficial time of 2:25:45. Her result contributed to a Kenyan podium sweep alongside Betty Chepkemoi and Rebecca Tanui.

She also took second place in the Wan Jin Shi Taipei Marathon.

== Personal bests ==
- Marathon – 2:22:42 (Frankfurt, 2024)
- Marathon – 2:31:34 (Munich, 2023)
