= Betty Chepkemoi =

Kenyan long-distance runner

Personal information
- Nationality: Kenyan
- Born: April 3, 2000 (age 26)

Sport
- Sport: Athletics
- Events: Long-distance running (10K, Half Marathon, Marathon)

Betty Chepkemoi (born 3 April 2000) is a Kenyan long-distance runner specializing in road races. She competes in events ranging from 10 kilometres to the marathon. She gained international recognition after winning the 2025 Vienna City Marathon, achieving a significant personal best in the process.

== Early life and background ==
Chepkemoi was born in Narok County, Kenya. She developed an interest in running during her childhood and began training seriously at the age of 14 while in primary school. Inspired by prominent Kenyan athletes such as Janeth Jepkosgei, Mercy Cherono, and Hellen Obiri, she pursued a career in athletics.

== Career ==
Originally focusing on the 3000 metres steeplechase, Chepkemoi transitioned to road running in 2021. She achieved early success by finishing second in her half marathon debut at the Rome–Ostia Half Marathon with a time of 1:06:37, which remains her personal best for the distance.

In 2022, Chepkemoi underwent nine months of military training, which temporarily interrupted her athletic career. She returned to competition in 2023 and made her marathon debut in November at the Istanbul Marathon, finishing fourth with a time of 2:34:52.

On 6 April 2025, Chepkemoi won the 42nd Vienna City Marathon in 2:24:14, improving her personal best by over ten minutes. The race was held under challenging conditions, with temperatures around 2°C at the start. Her victory led a Kenyan podium sweep, with compatriots Rebecca Tanui and Catherine Cherotich finishing second and third, respectively.

== Personal bests ==
As of April 2025, Chepkemoi's personal bests are:

- 10K Road – 31:08 (Valencia, 2021)
- Half Marathon – 1:06:37 (Rome–Ostia, 2021)
- Marathon – 2:24:14 (Vienna, 2025)
