= Aurelio Terrazas =

Mexican long-distance runner

Personal information
- Born: Aurelio Terrazas Estrada; 28 April 1904 Chihuahua, Mexico
- Died: 22 September 1984 (aged 80) Chihuahua, Mexico
- Height: 1.60 m (5 ft 3 in)

Sport
- Sport: Long-distance running
- Event: Marathon

Aurelio Terrazas Estrada (28 April 1904 – 22 September 1984) was a Mexican long-distance runner. He competed in the marathon at the 1928 Summer Olympics. He was the first Rarámuri to take part at a main international competition and the Mexican long distance runner at the Summer Olympics.

== Biography ==
Born in Chihuahua on 28 April 1904, Terrazas was an indigenous peoples of the Americas belonging to the Rarámuri. People of the Rarámuri are known for walking hundreds of kilometres without getting tired. He is together with José Torres the first Rarámuri to take part at a main international competition, and the first Mexican long distance runner at the Summer Olympics.

After running a 80 miles time trial run from Toluca to Mexico City and back he was selected to run the marathon at the 1928 Summer Olympics together with Torres. They were not used to high rise buildings as they stated when visiting New York City during their journey to Amsterdam, Netherlands: “The streets are like our ravines; the sun never hitting the bottom”.

While not finishing the marathon at the 1928 Summer Olympics in a high ranked position, he is still remembered for his appearance. While having start number 1 he was the last to cross the start. He finished over 2.5 hours in 32nd place behind Boughera El Ouafi. However after the 42.2 km marathon he continued running together; with his friend José Torres. Officials start chasing them to tell them the race is over. But they start shouting disappointed in Tarahumara language “Too short! Too short!”.

They also stated that the course of the marathon was too flat. Many years after the Olympics one of them said that they didn’t win the marathon because they were not used to the food.

He died in his hometown Chihuahua on 22 September 1984 at the age of 80.
