= Giuseppe Ferrera =

Italian long-distance runner

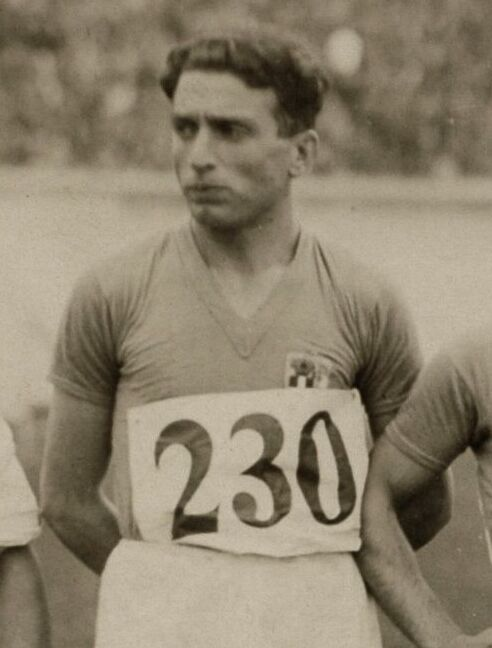
- Ferrera at the 1928 Summer Olympics

Personal information
- Nationality: Italian
- Born: 1 August 1905
- Died: 25 April 1964 (aged 58)

Sport
- Sport: Long-distance running
- Event: Marathon

Giuseppe Ferrera (1 August 1905 – 25 April 1964) was an Italian long-distance runner. He competed in the marathon at the 1928 Summer Olympics.
