= Steaua București football records dispute =

Romanian professional football club

The historical records of the Steaua București football team are disputed by CSA Steaua București and FC FCSB. Founded on 7 June 1947, as part of the multi-sports club run by the Romanian Ministry of National Defence, the football team became one of the most successful in Romanian history. The team's most notable achievement was winning the European Cup in 1986, making it the first Eastern European team to do so, followed by the European Super Cup in 1987.

== Background ==
Steaua București was founded in 1947, by the Ministry of National Defence, with the football team being one of the first and most successful sections of the club. Its successes include 20 domestic league titles, 20 Romanian Cups, 3 Romanian Supercups, the 1985–86 European Cup and the 1986 European Super Cup.

In the post-Ceaușescu era, the state continued to finance the club for some years, but in the late 1990s, clubs were asked to find alternative sources of funding. In 1998, a new non-governmental organization, AFC Steaua București, was created in a privatization scheme under which the then Minister of National Defence, Victor Babiuc, granted the NGO the right to use the Steaua brand name and the Steaua Stadium, as well as Steaua's place in the Romanian first division, and its entire staff.

In the early 2000s, AFC Steaua, under Viorel Păunescu, president of the new organization, began borrowing money from Gigi Becali. In exchange for the debts, Becali received federative rights over the players, along with the promise of receiving shares in the future.

At the beginning of 2003, it was decided to establish FC Steaua București SA, a joint-stock company in which AFC Steaua was one of the shareholders. This decision was made because the law prohibited AFC Steaua, as an NGO, from transforming into a joint-stock company. Gigi Becali received 51% of the shares, AFC Steaua held 36%, Viorel Păunescu 6%, Victor Pițurcă 4%, and Lucian Becali 3%. The total value of the shares at that time was estimated at 10 million dollars. The newly formed club formally requested permission from CSA Steaua to use the Steaua brand, similar to what AFC Steaua had done, but their request was denied.

== Disputes ==
In 2011, CSA Steaua sued Becali's club, claiming that it had been using the brand illegally since 2004 and demanding that it be revoked. The request was denied by the Bucharest Tribunal on 17 April 2012, and the Court of Appeal upheld this decision on 20 December 2013. However, on 3 December 2014, the High Court of Cassation and Justice overturned the decision rulling that Becali's club had no right to use the team's name, colors or logo.

On 23 October 2023 the Bucharest Court of Appeal definitively ruled that CSA Steaua retains its records for the period between 1947 and 1998. The court also rejected the Army club's claim for the period between 1998 and 2003, which remains with the now defunct AFC Steaua, Viorel Păunescu's organization. In the same case it denied rquest by Gigi Becali's club for sporting rights to the records from 2003 to 2017, as there has been no legal acquisition of the rights to them.

In June 2025, the High Court of Cassation and Justice of Romania rejected the appeal filed by Fotbal Club FCSB against the decision of the Bucharest Court of Appeal from October 2023. The supreme court thus confirmed, definitively and irrevocably, that the historical honors from 1947 to 1998 belong solely to CSA Steaua București and that FCSB does not own the honors from 2003 to 2017.

The trial about the trademark was still pending before the Constitutional Court of Romania with the verdict expected on 1 April 2026. A lower court was awaiting to issue a ruling, based upon that verdict, on 8 April 2026. On 1 April 2026 FCSB has lost that trial. This means all national remedies have been exhausted, including extraordinary remedies. Becali subsequently declared he will proceed to the European Court of Human Rights.

== Effects ==
=== FCSB ===
In 2014, following the Cassation Decision, team was forced to play their next league game in an all-yellow strip instead of their usual red and blue, the name on the scoreboard read "Hosts", and an empty square showed instead of a logo. On 30 March 2017, the club changed its name to Fotbal Club FCSB.

As a result of follow up decisions, Fotbal Club FCSB is officially left with recognition of only two national titles, won in the 2023–2024 and 2024–2025 seasons.

=== CSA Steaua București ===
CSA Steaua București is recognized as the rightful holder of the club’s historical honors won until 1998, including the 1986 European Cup and the national titles. In 2017, the Ministry of National Defence reactivated the CSA Steaua București football section, inactive since 1998, and enrolled the team into the 2017–2018 Liga IV. This decision followed court rulings that recognized CSA Steaua as the rightful owner of the original club’s name, logo, and history. As of now, CSA Steaua București competes in Liga II. Under Romanian law, publicly owned clubs are not permitted to compete in Liga I, which means the club is ineligible for promotion to the country's top division.

=== UEFA ===
At the end of May 2024, following the Court of Appeal ruling in October 2023, the Romanian Football Federation decided that they will inform UEFA about the recent decisions.

Following the final ruling of the Romanian courts in June 2025, the UEFA website updated its official records to reflect the judicial decisions regarding Steaua București’s historical honors. As a result, the 1985–86 European Cup trophy was reassigned from FCSB to Steaua București, which is now listed as the official winner of the competition. Additionally, UEFA updated FCSB’s European competition history so that it begins with the 2017–18 season, the first season after the club officially changed its name.

In an official response, UEFA stated that the changes were made following a “definitive ruling issued by a Romanian court”, referring to the June 2025 decision that confirmed CSA Steaua București as the rightful holder of the club’s honors from 1947 to 1998, established that the 1998–2003 period belongs to the now-defunct AFC Steaua București, and ruled that FCSB had no legal right to use the historical records between 2003 and 2017. At the moment, some statistical sections, such as FCSB’s all-time top scorers, still list players who, according to court rulings, never played for the entity.
