= Kumeshi Sichala =

Ethiopian long-distance runner

Personal information
- Nationality: Ethiopian
- Born: 19 June 1995 (age 30) Ethiopia

Sport
- Sport: Athletics
- Event(s): Marathon, Long-distance running

Kumeshi Sichala (born on June 19,1995) is an Ethiopian long-distance runner specializing in marathon. She gained international recognition through podium finishes at major road races, notably winning the 2025 Chevron Houston Marathon with a personal best time of 2:20:42.

== Career ==
Sichala made her international marathon debut in 2019, winning the Košice Peace Marathon in Slovakia with a time of 2:26:01, which was a personal best at the time.

That same year, she also finished second at the Lanzhou International Marathon in China with a time of 2:30:57, third at the Riga Marathon in Latvia with a time of 2:42:33, and third in the Kyiv Half Marathon in Ukraine, with a time of 1:16:12.

Sichala returned to competition in 2024. She placed fourth at the Los Angeles Marathon in the United States with a time of 2:27:06, and later that year, secured second place at the Gold Coast Marathon in Australia, setting a personal best at the time with 2:25:25.

In January 2025, she achieved a significant breakthrough by winning the women's race at the Chevron Houston Marathon with a time of 2:20:42. This victory placed her more than two minutes ahead of the second-place finisher, Erika Kemp of the United States.

== Select career results ==
Year	Competition	Position	Time	Notes
2019	Košice Peace Marathon	1st	2:26:01	Personal best at the time
2019	Lanzhou International Marathon	2nd	2:30:57	
2019	Riga Marathon	3rd	2:42:33	
2019	Kyiv Half Marathon	3rd	1:16:12	
2024	Los Angeles Marathon	4th	2:27:06	
2024	Gold Coast Marathon	2nd	2:25:25	Personal best at the time
2025	Chevron Houston Marathon	1st	2:20:42	Personal best

== Personal bests ==
- Marathon – 2:20:42 (Houston, 19 January 2025)
- Half marathon – 1:10:56 (Karlsbad, 24 May 2014)
