= Supercupa României =

Romanian association football tournament

- Organiser(s): Romanian Football Federation
- Founded: 1994; 32 years ago
- Region: Romania
- Teams: 2
- Current champions: FCSB (8th title) (Note: Subject to legal challenge: see Steaua București football records dispute)
- Most championships: FCSB (8th title)
- Broadcaster(s): Digi Sport, Orange Sport (Romania), Prima Sport

The Supercupa României (English: Romanian Supercup) is a one-off football match in Romania that features the winners of the Liga I and the Cupa României. It is usually played at the Arena Națională in Bucharest.

The competition started off in 1994, with the first edition being won by Steaua București. In 2010, for the first time in its history, the Supercup was held even though CFR Cluj had been victorious in both the league and the cup in the previous season. At that time, they faced Unirea Urziceni, the Liga I runners-up.

The most successful performer so far is FCSB winning the competition 8 times.

== Sponsorship ==
On 22 July 2005, FRF and Samsung Electronics signed a one-year sponsorship deal. The name of the competition was changed to Supercupa României Samsung for the 2005 and 2006 editions.

On 9 October 2006, FRF and Ursus Breweries (part of the SABMiller group) signed a sponsorship agreement for the next three seasons. Ursus Breweries changed the name of the competition to Supercupa României Timișoreana, after the Timișoreana beer brand.

== Results of the finals ==
Key
*	Match went to extra time
†	Match decided by a penalty shootout after extra time
‡	Team won the Double
^{1} ^{/} ^{2}	Liga I Runners-up
Italics	Event not held

Year	Liga I Champions	Result	Cupa României Winners	Venue
1994	Steaua București	1–0 AET *	Gloria Bistrița	Național, Bucharest
1995	Steaua București	2–0	Petrolul Ploiești	Regie, Bucharest
1996	Steaua București won the Double.			
1997	Steaua București won the Double.			
1998	Steaua București	4–0	Rapid București	Național, Bucharest
1999	Rapid București	5–0	Steaua București	Național, Bucharest
2000	Dinamo București won the Double.			
2001	Steaua București	2–1	Dinamo București	Național, Bucharest
2002	Dinamo București	1–2	Rapid București	Național, Bucharest
2003	Rapid București	1–0 AET *	Dinamo București	Național, Bucharest
2004	Dinamo București won the Double.			
2005	FCSB	2–3	Dinamo București	Cotroceni, Bucharest
2006	FCSB	1–0	Rapid București	Național, Bucharest
2007	Dinamo București	1–1 (6–7 PS) †	Rapid București	Național, Bucharest
2008	CFR Cluj won the Double.			
2009	Unirea Urziceni	1–1 (3–4 PS) †	CFR Cluj	Giulești, Bucharest
2010	CFR Cluj ‡	2–2 (2–0 PS) †	Unirea Urziceni^{1}	Dr. Constantin Rădulescu, Cluj-Napoca
2011	Oţelul Galați	1–0	FCSB	Ceahlăul, Piatra Neamţ
2012	CFR Cluj	2–2 (2–4 PS) †	Dinamo București	Arena Națională, Bucharest
2013	FCSB	3–0	Petrolul Ploiești	Arena Națională, Bucharest
2014	FCSB	1–1 (3–5 PS) †	Astra Giurgiu	Arena Națională, Bucharest
2015	FCSB ‡	0–1	ASA Târgu Mureș^{2}	Farul, Constanța
2016	Astra Giurgiu	1–0	CFR Cluj	Cluj Arena, Cluj-Napoca
2017	Viitorul Constanța	0–1	FC Voluntari	Municipal, Botoșani
2018	CFR Cluj	1–0	Universitatea Craiova	Ion Oblemenco, Craiova
2019	CFR Cluj	0–1	Viitorul Constanța	Ilie Oană, Ploiești
2020	CFR Cluj	0–0 (4–1 PS) †	FCSB	Ilie Oană, Ploiești
2021	CFR Cluj	0–0 (2–4 PS) †	Universitatea Craiova	Arena Națională, Bucharest
2022	CFR Cluj	1–2	Sepsi OSK	Stadionul Francisc von Neuman, Arad
2023	Farul Constanța	0–1	Sepsi OSK	Ilie Oană, Ploiești
2024	FCSB	3–0	Corvinul Hunedoara	Steaua, Bucharest
2025	FCSB	2–1	CFR Cluj	Steaua, Bucharest

^{1} Because CFR Cluj won the double, Unirea Urziceni, the team that was the runner-up of the previous Liga I season, was chosen to play in the Romanian Supercup as their opponent. This rule was adopted in 2009.

^{2} Because FCSB won the double, ASA Târgu Mureș, the team that was the runner-up of the previous Liga I season, was chosen to play in the Romanian Supercup as their opponent. This rule was adopted in 2009.

== Performances ==
=== Performance by qualification ===
Competition	Winners	Runners-up
Liga I winners	15	12
Cupa României winners	11	13
Liga I runners-up	1	1

=== Performance by club ===
Team	Champion	Runner-up	Winning years	Runner-up years
CFR Cluj	4	6	2009, 2010, 2018, 2020	2012, 2016, 2019, 2021, 2022, 2025
FCSB	4	5	2006, 2013, 2024, 2025	2005, 2011, 2014, 2015, 2020
Rapid București	4	2	1999, 2002, 2003, 2007	1998, 2006
Steaua București	4	1	1994, 1995, 1998, 2001	1999
Dinamo București	2	4	2005, 2012	2001, 2002, 2003, 2007
Astra Giurgiu	2	–	2014, 2016	–
Sepsi Sfântu Gheorghe	2	–	2022, 2023	–
Viitorul Constanța	1	1	2019	2017
Universitatea Craiova	1	1	2021	2018
ASA 2013 Târgu Mureș	1	–	2015	–
Oţelul Galați	1	–	2011	–
Voluntari	1	–	2017	–
Petrolul Ploiești	–	2	–	1995, 2013
Unirea Urziceni	–	2	–	2009, 2010
Farul Constanța	–	1	–	2023
Gloria Bistrița	–	1	–	1994

=== Performance by city ===
City	Cups	Winning clubs
Bucharest	14	FCSB (8), Rapid București (4), Dinamo București (2)
Cluj-Napoca	4	CFR Cluj (4)
Giurgiu	2	Astra Giurgiu (2)
Sfântu Gheorghe	2	Sepsi OSK Sfântu Gheorghe (2)
Ovidiu	1	Viitorul Constanța (1)
Târgu Mureș	1	ASA Târgu Mureș (1)
Galați	1	Oțelul Galați (1)
Craiova	1	Universitatea Craiova (1)

Map of Romania with the cities/towns of the Romanian Supercup winners marked.
The cities/towns with eleven or more Romanian Supercup winners.
The cities/towns with 2–10 Supercup winners.
The cities/towns with 1 Supercup winner.
