= Georg Hoerger =

German long-distance runner (1897–1975)

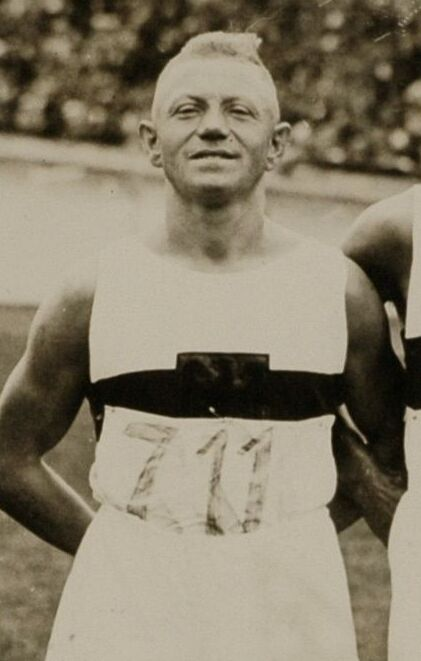
- Hoerger in 1928

Personal information
- Nationality: German
- Born: 8 September 1897 Herbrechtingen, Germany
- Died: 14 July 1975 (aged 77) Erfurt, Germany

Sport
- Sport: Long-distance running
- Event: Marathon

Georg Hoerger (8 September 1897 – 14 July 1975) was a German long-distance runner. He competed in the marathon at the 1928 Summer Olympics.
