= Hans Stelges =

German long-distance runner (1901–1986)

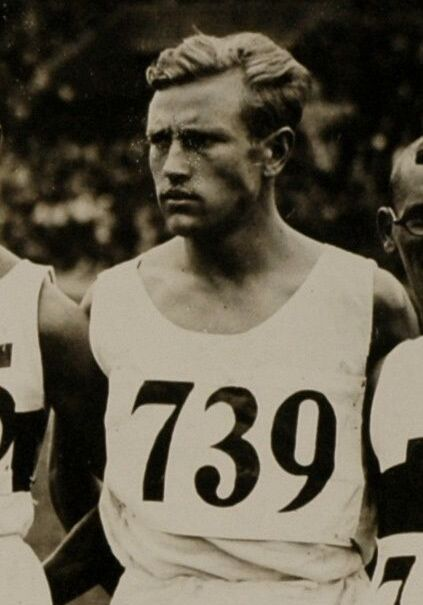
- Stelges in 1928

Personal information
- Nationality: German
- Born: 6 June 1901 Essen, Germany
- Died: 17 December 1986 (aged 85) Baden-Baden, Germany

Sport
- Sport: Long-distance running
- Event: Marathon

Hans Stelges (6 June 1901 – 17 December 1986) was a German long-distance runner. He competed in the marathon at the 1928 Summer Olympics.
