= Leonard Broers =

Belgian long-distance runner

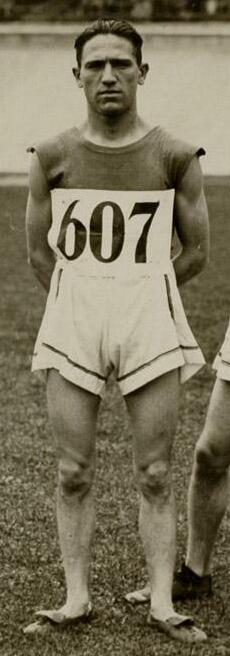
- Broers at the 1928 Summer Olympics

Personal information
- Nationality: Belgian
- Born: Leonard Pieter Maria August Broers; 11 October 1906 Mechelen, Belgium

Sport
- Sport: Long-distance running
- Event: Marathon

Leonard Broers (born 11 October 1906, date of death unknown) was a Belgian long-distance runner. He competed in the marathon at the 1928 Summer Olympics.
