= Gottlieb Bach =

Danish long-distance runner

Personal information
- Nationality: Danish
- Born: 4 February 1900 Copenhagen, Denmark
- Died: 15 March 1973 (aged 73) Copenhagen, Denmark

Sport
- Sport: Long-distance running
- Event: Marathon

Gottlieb Bach (4 February 1900 – 15 March 1973) was a Danish long-distance runner. He competed in the marathon at the 1928 Summer Olympics.
