= Jean Gérault =

French long-distance runner

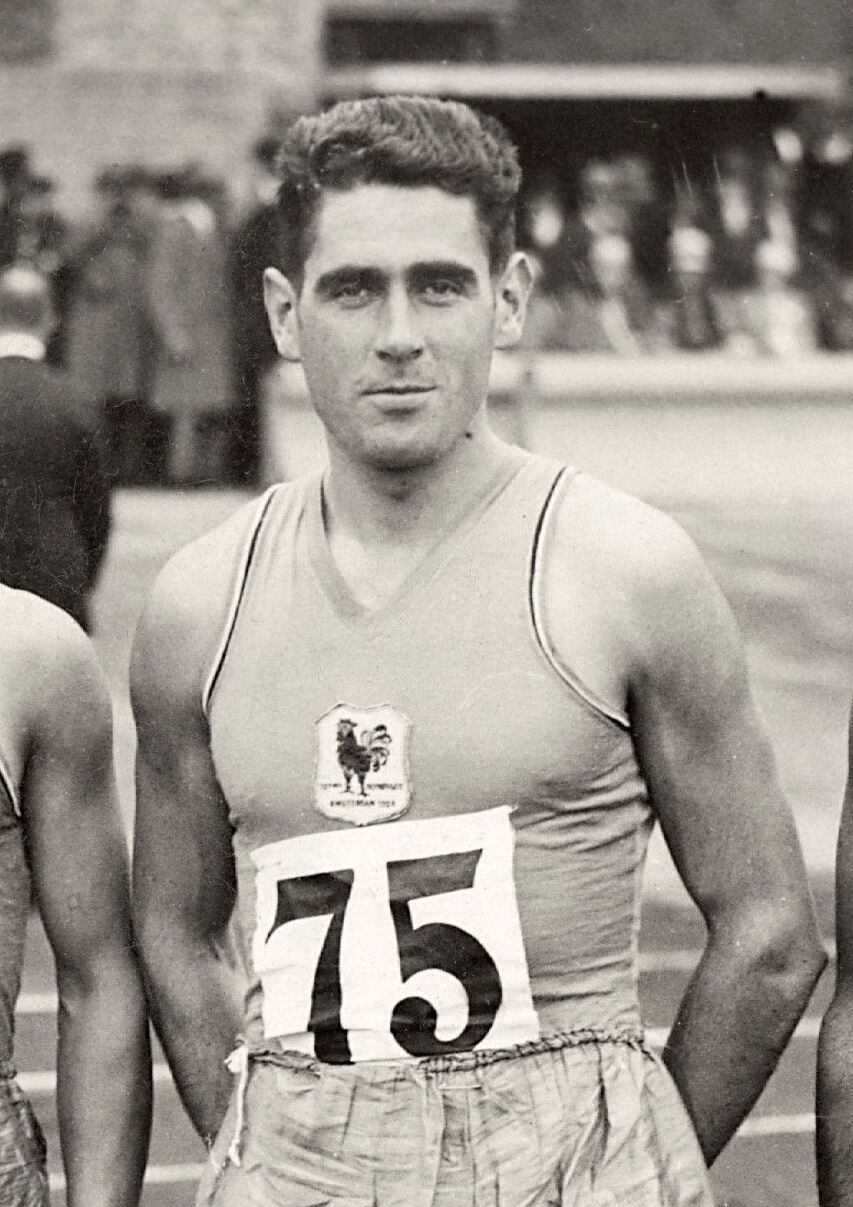
- Gérault at the 1928 Olympic maraton

Personal information
- Nationality: French
- Born: 8 May 1904 Boult-sur-Suippe, France
- Died: November 4, 1988 (aged 84) Reims, France

Sport
- Sport: Long-distance running
- Event: Marathon

Jean Gérault (8 May 1904 – 4 November 1988) was a French long-distance runner. He competed in the marathon at the 1928 Summer Olympics.
