= Marcel Denis (athlete) =

French long-distance runner

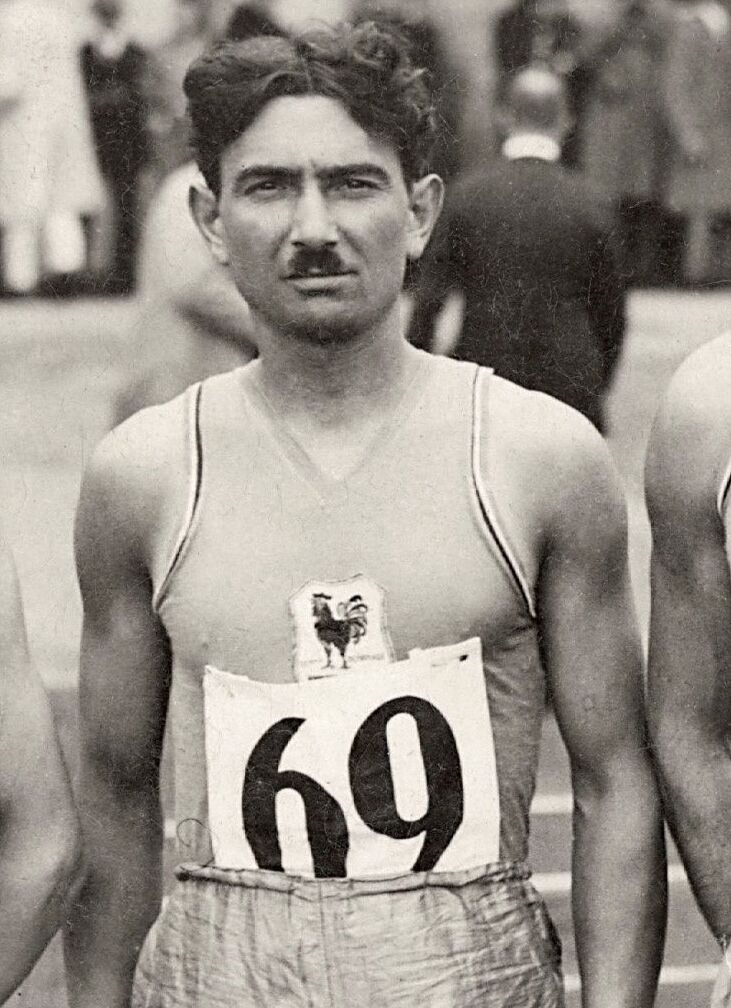
- Denis at the 1928 Olympic marathon

Personal information
- Nationality: French
- Born: 31 January 1896
- Died: 16 June 1953 (aged 57)

Sport
- Sport: Long-distance running
- Event: Marathon

Marcel Denis (31 January 1896 – 16 June 1953) was a French long-distance runner. He competed in the marathon at the 1928 Summer Olympics.
