= Frank Hughes (runner) =

Canadian long-distance runner

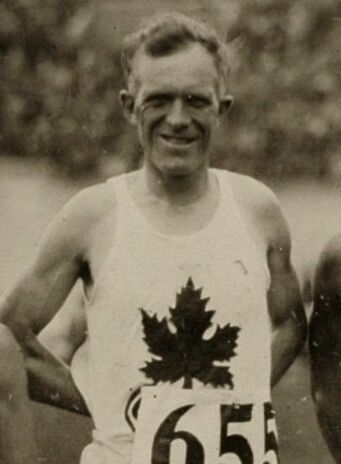
- Frank Hughes in 1928

Personal information
- Born: 3 September 1889 Hamilton, Ontario, Canada
- Died: 4 June 1974 (aged 84)

Sport
- Sport: Long-distance running
- Event: Marathon

Frank Hughes (3 September 1889 – 4 June 1974) was a Canadian long-distance runner. He competed in the marathon at the 1928 Summer Olympics.
