= Kanematsu Yamada =

Japanese long-distance runner

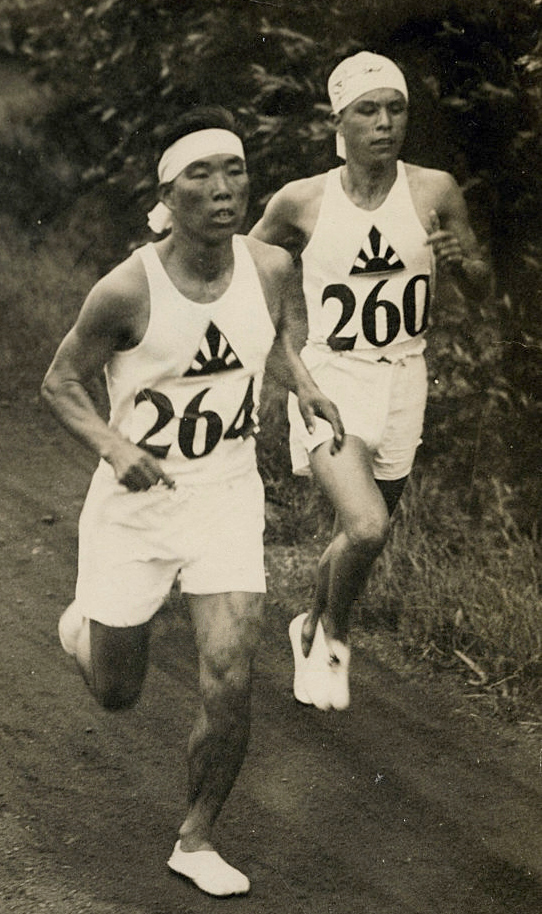
- Kanematsu Yamada (left) at the 1928 Olympics

Personal information
- Born: September 16, 1903 Sakaide, Kagawa, Japan
- Died: August 27, 1977 (aged 73)
- Height: 1.63 m (5 ft 4 in)
- Weight: 51 kg (112 lb)

Sport
- Sport: Long-distance running

Kanematsu Yamada (山田 兼松, September 16, 1903 – August 27, 1977) was a Japanese long-distance runner. He competed in the 1928 Olympics marathon, finishing in fourth place.
