= Henri Landheer =

Dutch long-distance runner

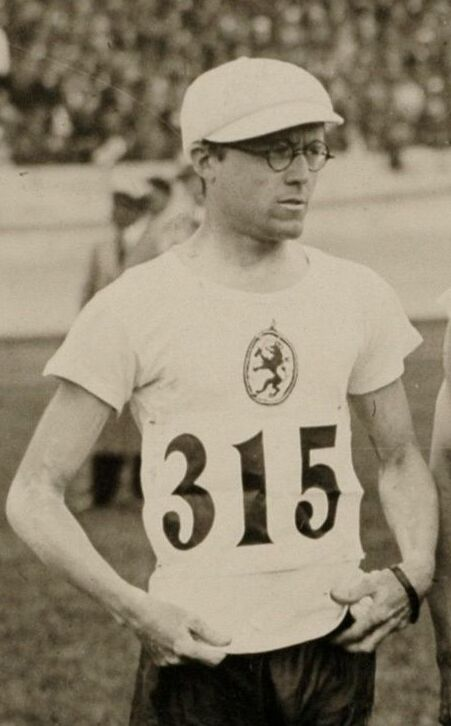
- Landheer (1928)

Personal information
- Nationality: Dutch
- Born: 27 April 1899 Veendam, Netherlands
- Died: 15 March 1958 (aged 58) Amsterdam, Netherlands

Sport
- Sport: Long-distance running
- Event: Marathon

Henri Landheer (27 April 1899 – 15 March 1958) was a Dutch long-distance runner. He competed in the marathon at the 1928 Summer Olympics.
