= Vintilă Cristescu =

Romanian long-distance runner and footballer

Vintilǎ Cristescu
Personal information
- Nationality: Romanian
- Born: 1896
- Died: October 1971 (aged 74–75)

Sport
- Sport: Long-distance running
- Event: Marathon

Vintilǎ Cristescu (1896 – October 1971) was a Romanian long-distance runner and a football player.

== Career ==
Cristescu was a football player in the 1910s at Colțea București. In 1920, together with Colțea București teammates Iacobescu and Puiu Pavel, they founded Colțea Brașov, a team that would win the national championship in the 1927–28 season with Cristescu as its leader. His long-distance runner career began in 1921 when he won the first national marathon race held in Romania, running 42,192 km. He went on to win the national marathon championship four more times (1923, 1925, 1926, 1927), also participating in the 1924 "Pannonian Games" and in the marathon at the 1928 Summer Olympics.

Cristescu was also a colonel in the Romanian Army who fought in World War II with the Vânători de munte elite mountain troops. His father, captain Sava Cristescu, fought in World War I in the Battle of Brașov.
