= Kurt Schneider (athlete) =

German long-distance runner (1900–1988)

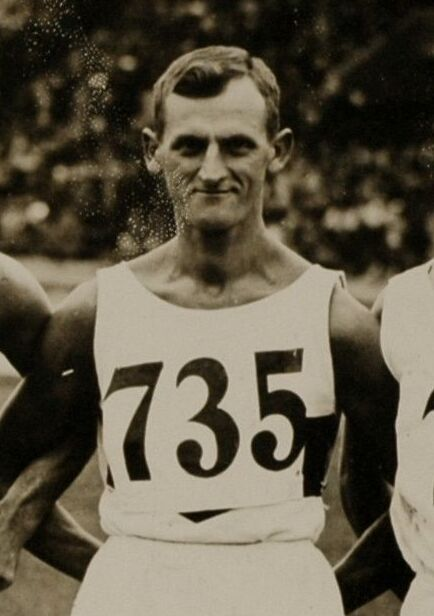
- Schneider in 1928

Personal information
- Nationality: German
- Born: 3 February 1900 Jelenia Góra, Poland
- Died: 26 July 1988 (aged 88) Bad Oldesloe, Germany

Sport
- Sport: Long-distance running
- Event: Marathon

Kurt Schneider (3 February 1900 – 26 July 1988) was a German long-distance runner. He competed in the marathon at the 1928 Summer Olympics.
