= Harry Wood (athlete) =

British athlete

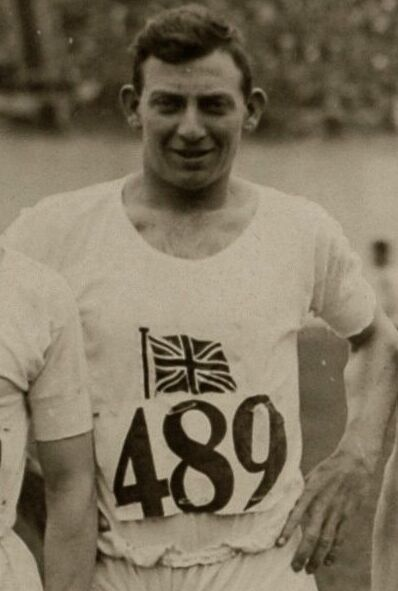
- Wood at the 1928 Summer Olympics

Personal information
- Nationality: British
- Born: 28 November 1902 Wigan, England
- Died: 27 June 1975 (aged 72) Wigan, England

Sport
- Sport: Long-distance running
- Event: Marathon

Harold 'Harry' Wood (28 November 1902 – 27 June 1975) was a British long-distance runner.

== Athletics career ==
He competed in the marathon at the 1928 Summer Olympics.

He also competed for England in the marathon at the 1934 British Empire Games in London.

== Personal life ==
Wood was a miner by trade.
