= Corneliu Robe =

Romanian footballer

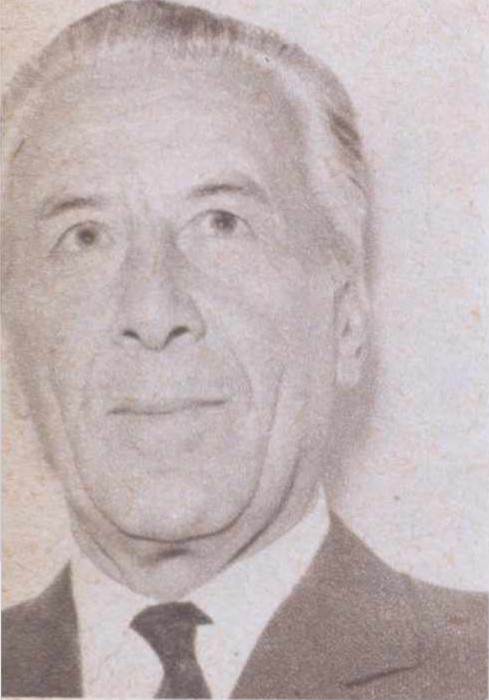

Personal information
- Full name: Corneliu Robe
- Date of birth: 23 May 1908
- Place of birth: Bucharest, Romania
- Date of death: 4 January 1969 (aged 60)
- Place of death: Bucharest, Romania
- Position: Midfielder

Senior career*
| Years | Team | Apps | (Gls) |
| 1924–1925 | Colțea București | | |
| 1925–1932 | Olympia București | | |
| 1932–1936 | Unirea Tricolor București | 40 | (1) |
| 1936–1937 | Sportul Studențesc București | | |

International career
| 1930–1935 | Romania | 14 | (0) |
- * Club domestic league appearances and goals

Corneliu Robe (23 May 1908 – 4 January 1969) was a Romanian football player who was a member of the Romania national football team which participated in the 1930 FIFA World Cup. He used to play as a midfielder.

== Career ==
=== Club career ===
In his career as a football player, Corneliu Robe played for four clubs: Colțea, Olympia, Unirea Tricolor and Sportul Studențesc all teams from Bucharest, his hometown. He started his career in 1924, when he was sixteen, at Colțea București. He played for Olympia from 1925 until 1932, when he signed with Unirea Tricolor București, a club from Obor (Colentina quarter). He retired from football in 1937, when he was only twenty-nine.

=== National team ===
Corneliu Robe played for the Romania national football team between 1930 and 1935. In 1930, despite not having any appearance for the national team, he was picked up for Romania's squad for the 1930 FIFA World Cup in Uruguay. He played his first match for the national team at the 1930 FIFA World Cup, a defeat against the winners of the competition, Uruguay. He gained fourteen caps for Romania, but he did not score a goal. His last match for the national team was a defeat against Yugoslavia, on 1 January 1935.

== Honours ==
Sportul Studențesc București

- Liga II (1): 1936–37
