= Gösta Leandersson =

Swedish marathon runner

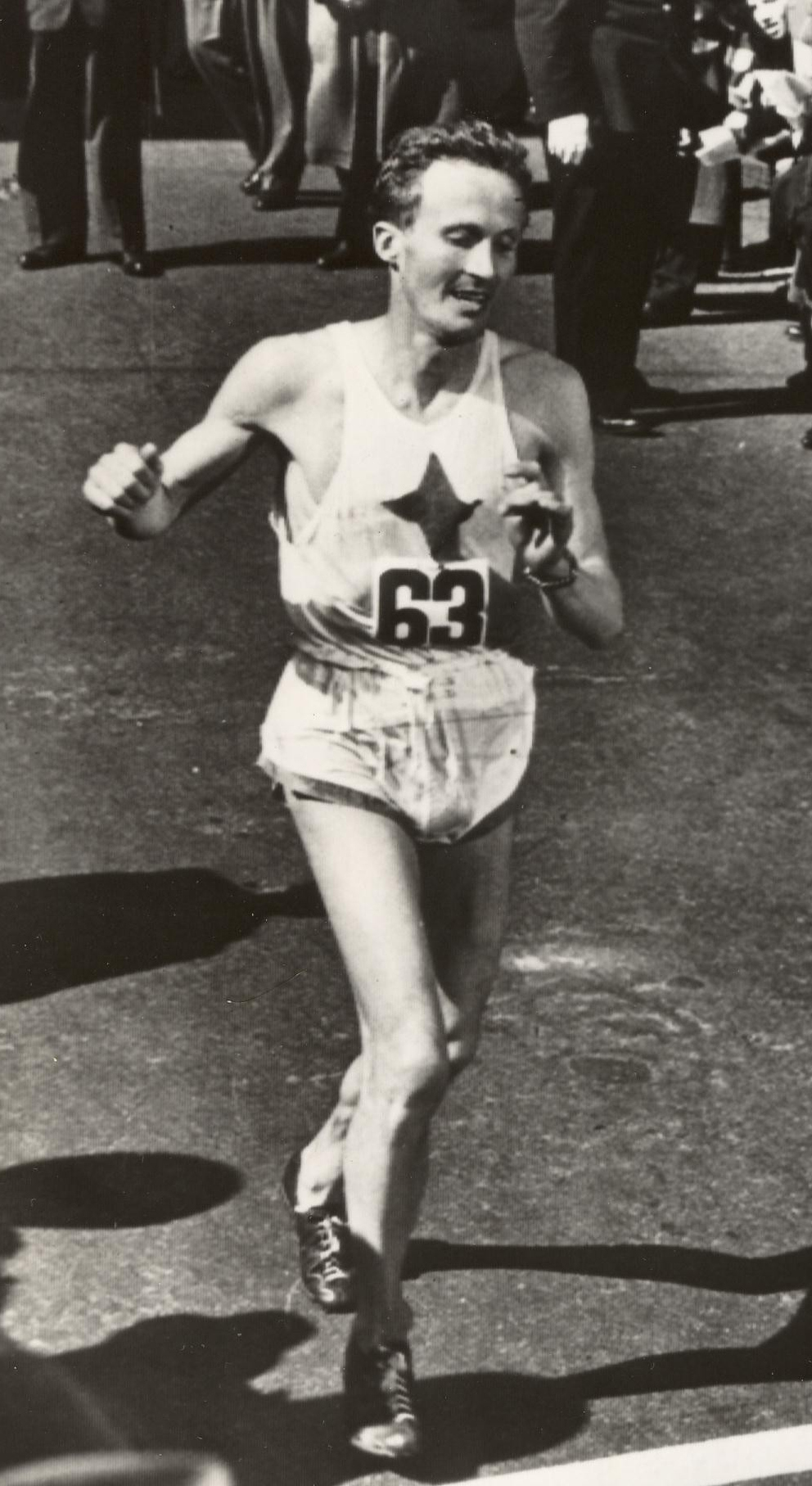
- Leandersson at the 1949 Boston Marathon

Personal information
- Born: 22 April 1918
- Died: 1995 (aged 76–77)

Sport
- Sport: Athletics
- Event(s): Marathon, 10,000 m
- Club: Vålådalens SK

Achievements and titles
- Personal best(s): Marathon – 2:19:36 (1953); 10,000 m – 31:29.0 (1943)

Gösta Leandersson (22 April 1918 – 1995) was a Swedish marathon runner. He won the Košice Peace Marathon in 1948 and 1950, the Boston Marathon in 1949 and the Yonkers Marathon in 1953. At the European championships he finished fifth in 1946, and fourth in 1950.
