= Franz Wanderer =

German long-distance runner (1901–1944)

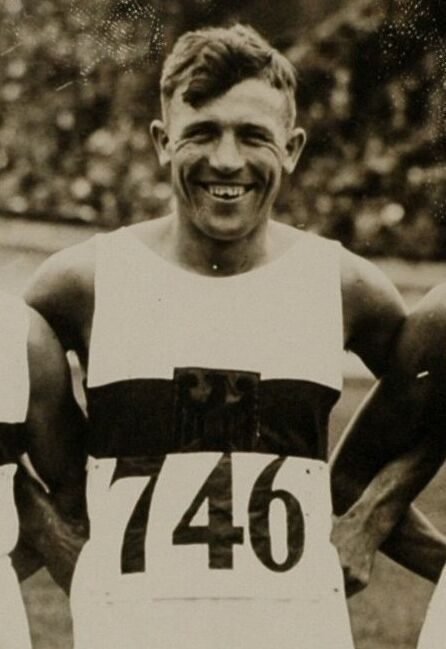
- Wanderer in 1928

Personal information
- Nationality: German
- Born: 20 February 1901 Ilmenau, Germany
- Died: 1944 (aged 42–43)

Sport
- Sport: Long-distance running
- Event: Marathon

Franz Wanderer (20 February 1901 – 1944) was a German long-distance runner. He competed in the marathon at the 1928 Summer Olympics.
