= Pleun van Leenen =

Dutch long-distance runner

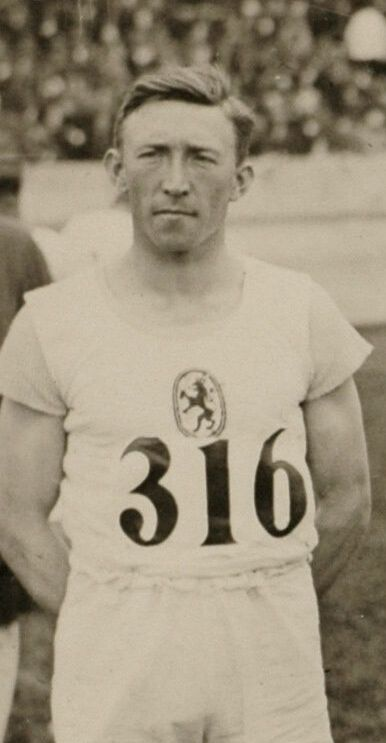
- Van Leenen (1928)

Personal information
- Nationality: Dutch
- Born: 2 January 1901 Rotterdam, Netherlands
- Died: 27 January 1982 (aged 81) Rotterdam, Netherlands

Sport
- Sport: Long-distance running
- Event: Marathon

Pleun van Leenen (2 January 1901 – 27 January 1982) was a Dutch long-distance runner. He competed in the marathon at the 1928 Summer Olympics.
