= František Zyka =

Czechoslovak long-distance runner

Personal information
- Nationality: Czechoslovak
- Born: 3 March 1902 Prague, Austria-Hungary

Sport
- Sport: Long-distance running
- Event: Marathon

František Zyka (born 3 March 1902, date of death unknown) was a Czechoslovak long-distance runner. He competed in the marathon at the 1928 Summer Olympics.
