= Paul Gerhardt (athlete) =

German long-distance runner (1901–1956)

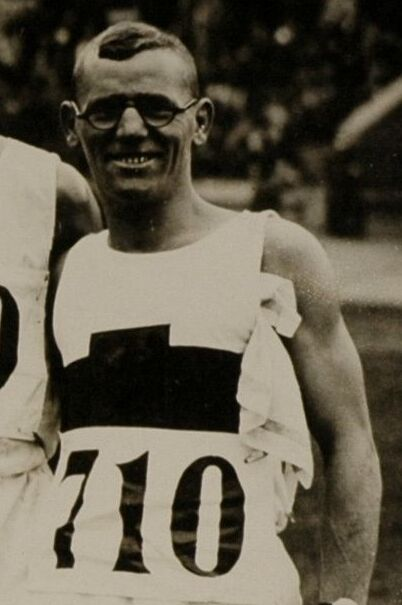
- Gerhardt in 1928

Personal information
- Nationality: German
- Born: 6 December 1901 Hanover, Germany
- Died: 12 August 1956 (aged 54) Gießen, Germany

Sport
- Sport: Long-distance running
- Event: Marathon

Paul Gerhardt (6 December 1901 – 12 August 1956) was a German long-distance runner. He competed in the marathon at the 1928 Summer Olympics.
