= Emilio Ferrer =

Spanish long-distance runner

Personal information
- Nationality: Spanish
- Born: 8 September 1904

Sport
- Sport: Long-distance running
- Event: Marathon

Emilio Ferrer (born 8 September 1904, date of death unknown) was a Spanish long-distance runner. He competed in the marathon at the 1928 Summer Olympics.
