= Willem van der Steen =

Dutch long-distance runner

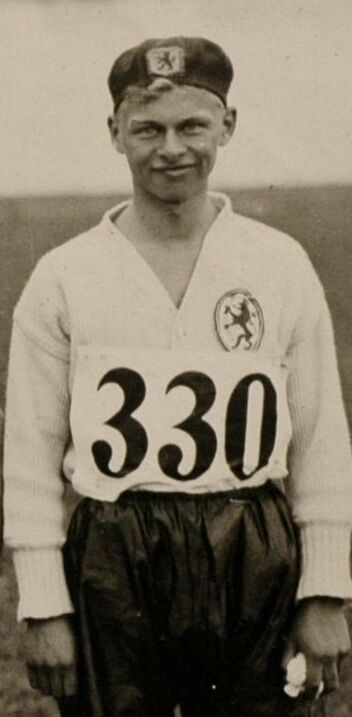
- Van der Steen (1928)

Personal information
- Nationality: Dutch
- Born: 9 November 1905 Amsterdam, Netherlands
- Died: 10 March 1983 (aged 77) Warnsveld, Netherlands

Sport
- Sport: Long-distance running
- Event: Marathon

Willem van der Steen (9 November 1905 – 10 March 1983) was a Dutch long-distance runner. He competed in the marathon at the 1928 Summer Olympics.
