= Harvey Frick =

American long-distance runner

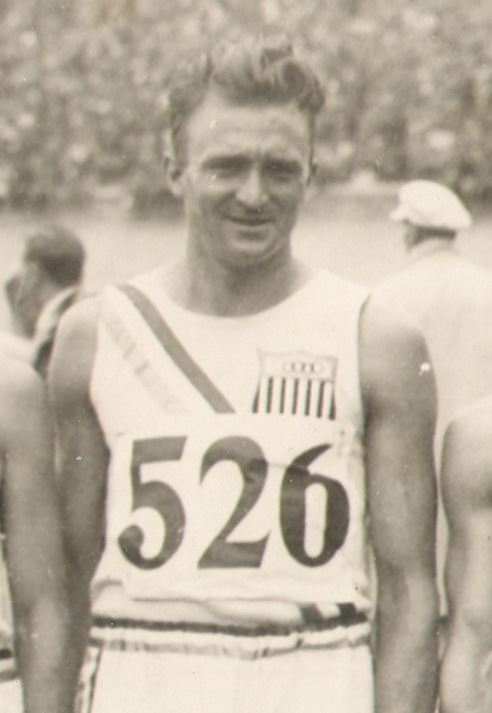

Personal information
- Born: October 13, 1893 New York, New York, United States
- Died: May 6, 1966 (aged 72) Central Islip, New York, United States

Sport
- Sport: Long-distance running
- Event: Marathon

Harvey Frick (October 13, 1893 – May 6, 1966) was an American long-distance runner. He competed in the marathon at the 1928 Summer Olympics.
