= Valeriu Niculescu =

Romanian footballer

Sony Niculescu
Personal information
- Full name: Valeriu Niculescu
- Date of birth: 25 January 1914
- Place of birth: Brăila, Romania
- Date of death: 18 November 1986 (aged 72)
- Position: Striker

Youth career
- 1927–1934: Turda București

Senior career*
Years	Team	Apps	(Gls)
1934–1938	Unirea Tricolor București	74	(53)
1938–1940	Juventus București	9	(4)
1940–1945	Unirea Tricolor București	20	(21^{1})
1944	→ Lares București (loan)	0	(0^{1})
1945–1946	Ciocanul București	0	(0^{1})
1946–1947	Griviţa CFR București		
1947–1948	Unirea Tricolor București	3	(0)
Total		106	(78)

International career
1941–1942	Romania	2	(1)
- * Club domestic league appearances and goals

Valeriu "Sony" Niculescu (25 January 1914 – 18 November 1986) was a Romanian football striker.

== Honours ==
=== Club ===
Unirea Tricolor București

- Divizia A: 1940–41
- Cupa României runner-up: 1940–41

=== Individual ===
- Total matches played in Romanian First League: 106 matches – 78 goals
- Topscorer of Romanian First League: 1940–41

=== Notes ===
^{^1} The Divizia A 1940–41 was the last season before World War II and the Divizia A 1946–47 was the first one after, so the appearances and goals scored during this period for Unirea Tricolor București, Lares București and Ciocanul București are not official.
