= Axel Elofs =

Swedish long-distance runner

Personal information
- Full name: Axel Olof Bertil Elofs
- Nationality: Swedish
- Born: 20 November 1903 Leksand, Sweden
- Died: 2 October 1983 (aged 79) Stockholm, Sweden

Sport
- Sport: Long-distance running
- Event: Marathon

Axel Olof Bertil Elofs (20 November 1903 – 2 October 1983) was a Swedish long-distance runner. He competed in the marathon at the 1928 Summer Olympics.
