= Aksel Madsen (athlete) =

Danish long-distance runner

Personal information
- Nationality: Danish
- Born: 29 July 1899 Nykøbing Mors, Denmark
- Died: 15 December 1988 (aged 89) Herlev, Denmark

Sport
- Sport: Long-distance running
- Event: Marathon

Aksel Madsen (29 July 1899 – 15 December 1988) was a Danish long-distance runner. He competed in the marathon at the 1928 Summer Olympics.
