= Martti Marttelin =

Finnish runner

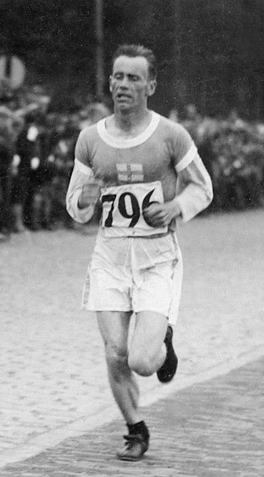
- Martti Marttelin at the 1928 Olympics

Personal information
- Full name: Martti Bertil Marttelin
- Nickname: Maratolin
- Nationality: Finland
- Born: 18 June 1897 Nummi, Grand Duchy of Finland, Russian Empire
- Died: 1 March 1940 (aged 42) Leningrad, Russian SFSR, Soviet Union
- Height: 1.76 m (5 ft 9 in)
- Weight: 66 kg (146 lb)

Sport
- Sport: Athletics
- Events: 10,000 m, marathon
- Club: Nummen Kipinä

Achievements and titles
- Personal bests: 10,000 m – 32:05.0 (1930); Marathon – 2:35.02 (1928)
Medal record
Olympic Games
Bronze medal – third place	1928 Amsterdam	Marathon

Martti Bertil Marttelin (18 June 1897 – 1 March 1940) was a long-distance runner from Finland, who competed at the 1928 Summer Olympics.

== Biography ==
Marttelin won the bronze medal in the men's marathon at the 1928 Summer Olympics.

Marttelin finished second behind Dunky Wright in the marathon event at the British 1930 AAA Championships.

He was killed in action during World War II.
