= Attilio Conton =

Italian long-distance runner

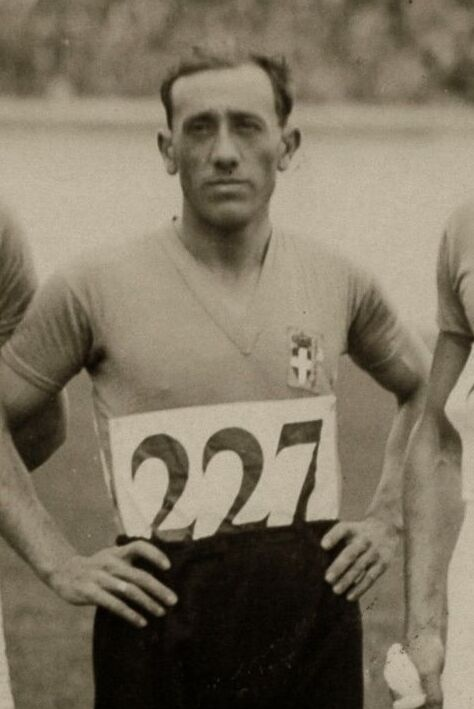
- Conton at the 1928 Summer Olympics

Personal information
- Nationality: Italian
- Born: 2 September 1902
- Died: 3 November 1997 (aged 95) Mira, Italy

Sport
- Sport: Long-distance running
- Event: Marathon

Attilio Conton (2 September 1902 – 3 November 1997) was an Italian long-distance runner. He competed in the marathon at the 1928 Summer Olympics.
