= Juichi Nagatani =

Japanese long-distance runner

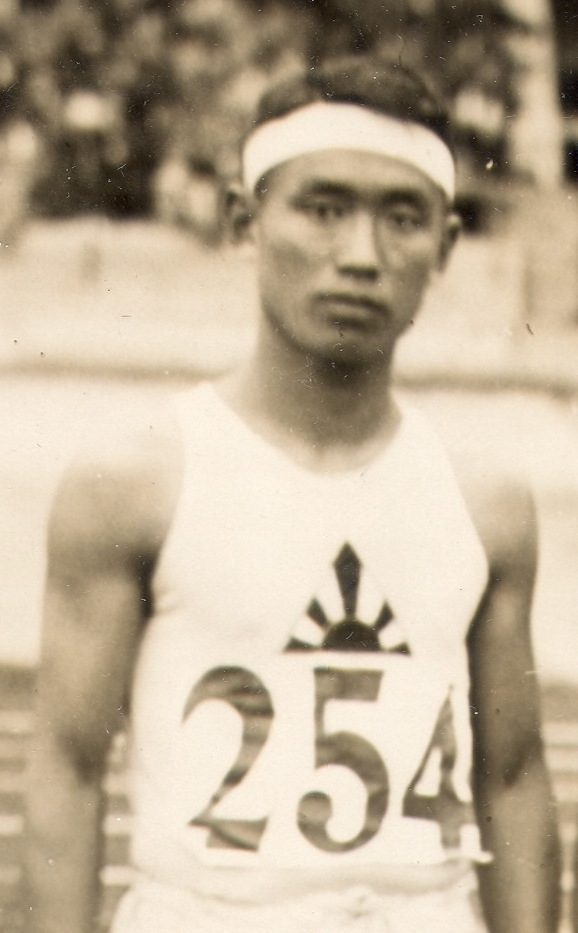
- Juichi Nagatani in 1928

Personal information
- Nationality: Japanese
- Born: 27 January 1903
- Died: 2 February 1953 (aged 50)

Sport
- Sport: Long-distance running
- Event: Marathon

Juichi Nagatani (born 27 January 1903 – 2 February 1953) was a Japanese long-distance runner. He competed in the marathon at the 1928 Summer Olympics.
