= Matthew Steytler =

South African long-distance runner

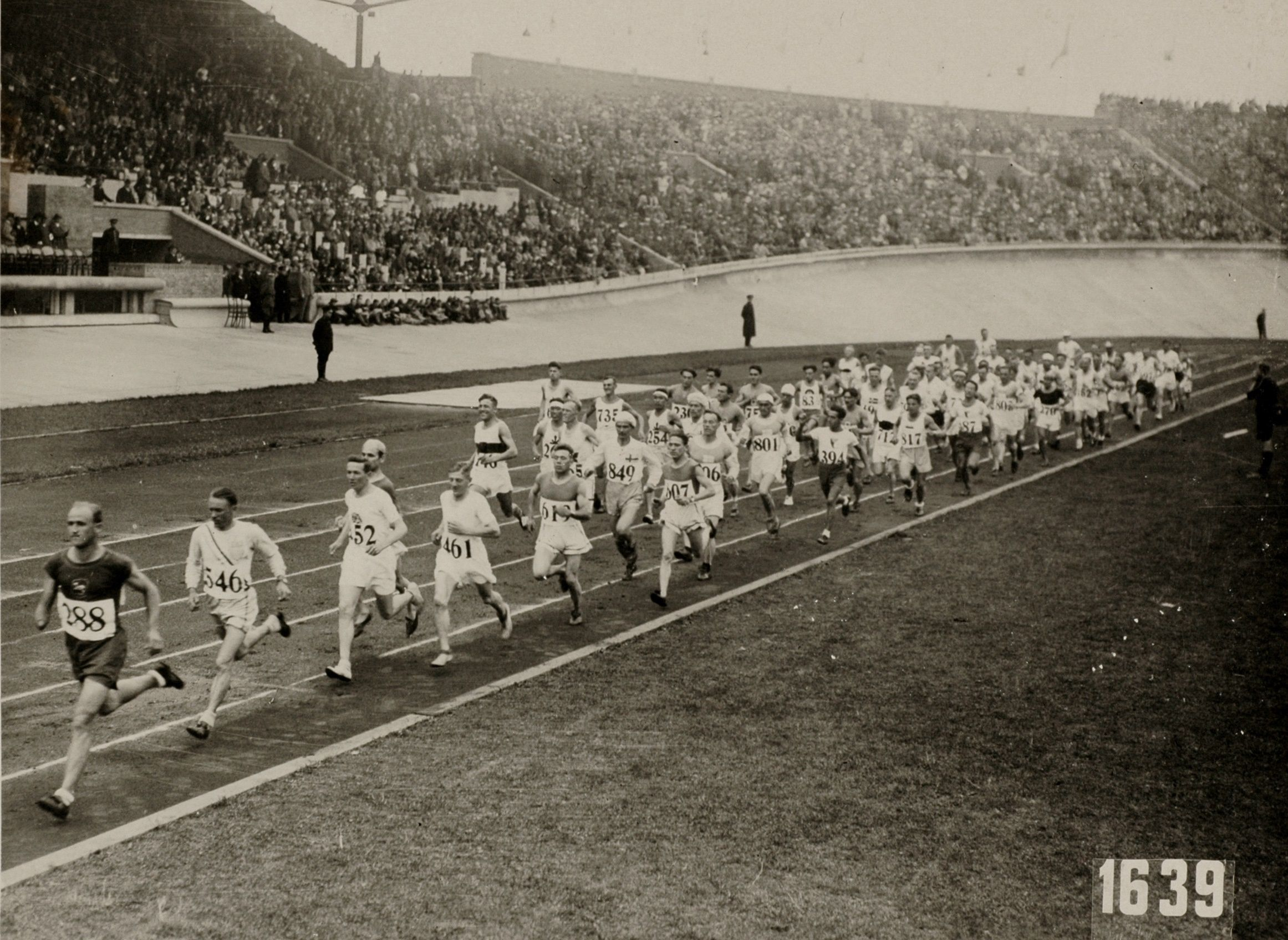
- Steytler (288) up front, Olympic Marathon 1928

Personal information
- Nationality: South African
- Born: 5 June 1895 Vryheid, Colony of Natal
- Died: 28 April 1977 (aged 81) Richmond, South Africa

Sport
- Sport: Long-distance running
- Event: Marathon

Matthew Steytler (5 June 1895 – 28 April 1977) was a South African long-distance runner. He competed in the marathon at the 1928 Summer Olympics.
