= Erkki Puolakka =

Finnish long-distance runner

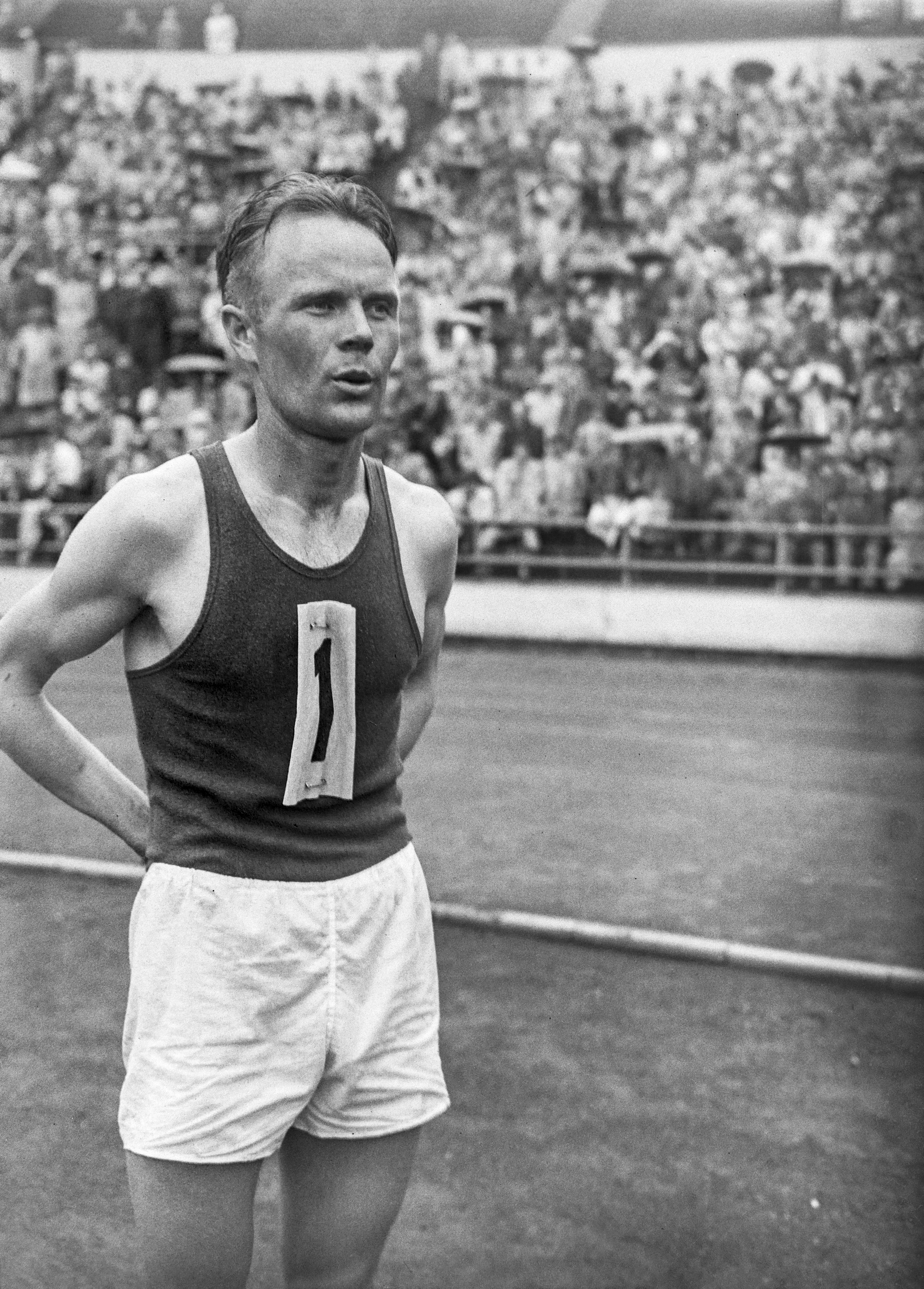
- 1952

Personal information
- Nationality: Finnish
- Born: 17 May 1925 Tervo, Finland
- Died: 22 December 2008 (aged 83) Äänekoski, Finland

Sport
- Sport: Long-distance running
- Event: Marathon

Erkki Mikael Puolakka (17 May 1925 – 22 December 2008) was a Finnish long-distance runner. He competed in the marathon at the 1952 Summer Olympics.
