= Koh Chun-son =

North Korean long-distance runner (born 1952)

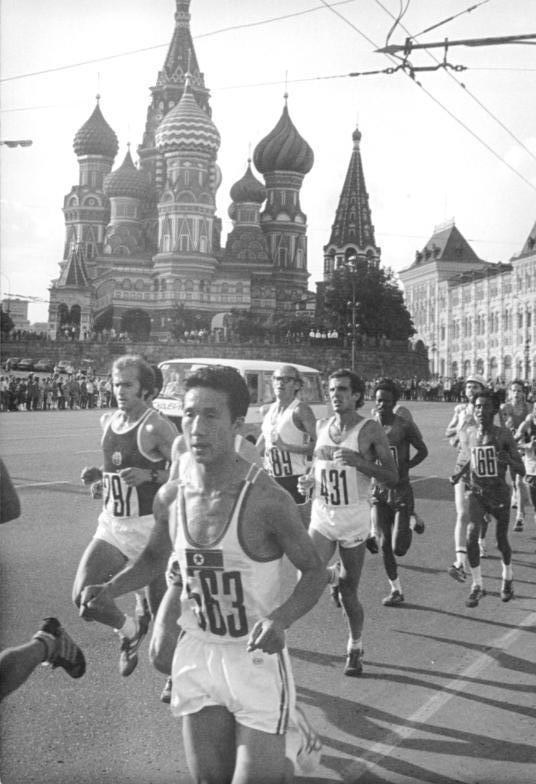
- Koh Chun-son (in foreground) competing in the 1980 Olympics marathon.

Personal information
- Nationality: North Korean
- Born: 2 June 1952 (age 73)

Sport
- Sport: Long-distance running
- Event: Marathon

Koh Chun-son (Korean: 고춘선; born 2 June 1952) is a North Korean long-distance runner. He competed in the marathon at the 1976 Summer Olympics and the 1980 Summer Olympics.
