= Gustav Kinn =

Swedish long-distance runner

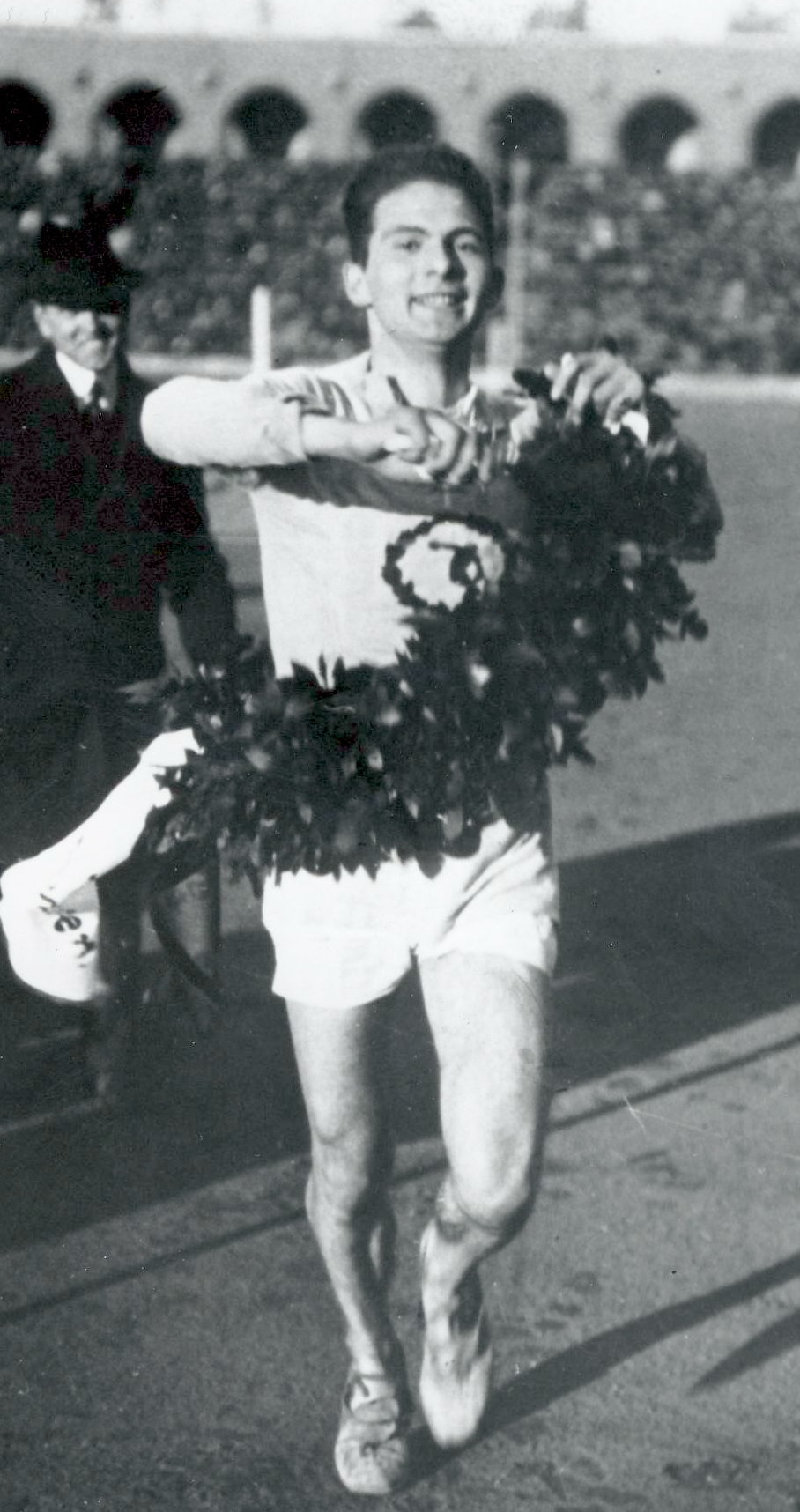

Personal information
- Nationality: Swedish
- Born: 10 June 1895 Avesta, Sweden
- Died: 31 October 1978 (aged 83) Älvkarleby, Sweden
- Height: 1.78 m (5 ft 10 in)
- Weight: 67 kg (148 lb)

Sport
- Sport: Long-distance running
- Event(s): Marathon, 10000 m
- Club: IF Thor, Uppsala

Achievements and titles
- Personal best(s): Marathon – 2:47:35 (1928); 10000 m – 34:14.1 (1918)

Gustav Richard Kinn (10 June 1895 – 31 October 1978) was a Swedish long-distance runner. He competed in the marathon at the 1920, 1924 and 1928 Summer Olympics and finished in 17th, 8th and 25th place, respectively. Kinn won the national marathon title in 1917, 1919–22, 1924–26, 1928 and 1929.
