= Ilmari Kuokka =

Finnish long-distance runner

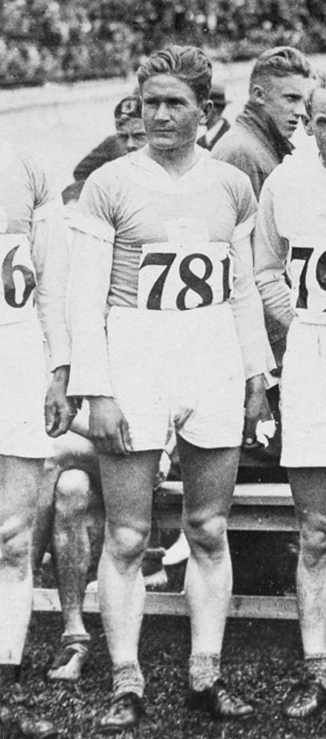
- Kuokka at the 1928 Olympics

Personal information
- Born: 23 July 1901 Virolahti, Finland
- Died: 17 January 1981 (aged 79) Nuijaama, Finland
- Height: 169 cm (5 ft 7 in)
- Weight: 58 kg (128 lb)

Sport
- Sport: Athletics
- Event(s): 10,000 m, marathon
- Club: Viipurin Urheilijat, Helsinki

Achievements and titles
- Personal best(s): 10,000 m – 32:05.2 (1929); Marathon – 2:40:40 (1928)

Ilmari Kuokka (23 July 1901 – 17 January 1981) was a Finnish long-distance runner. He competed in the marathon at the 1928 Summer Olympics and finished 24th.
