= José Torres (runner) =

Mexican long-distance runner

Personal information
- Born: 1903 Chihuahua City, Mexico

Sport
- Sport: Long-distance running
- Event: Marathon

José Torres (born 1903, date of death unknown) was a Mexican long-distance runner. He competed in the marathon at the 1928 Summer Olympics.
