= József Kiss (athlete) =

Hungarian long-distance runner

Personal information
- Nationality: Hungarian
- Born: 29 April 1909 Salgótarján, Austria-Hungary
- Died: 5 September 1986 (aged 77) Budapest, Hungary

Sport
- Sport: Long-distance running
- Event: Marathon

József Kiss (29 April 1909 – 5 September 1986) was a Hungarian long-distance runner. He competed in the marathon at the 1948 Summer Olympics in London, and finished 19th overall with a time of 2:50:20.0.
