= József Galambos =

Hungarian long-distance runner

Personal information
- Nationality: Hungarian
- Born: 27 July 1900 Gyüre, Austria-Hungary
- Died: 6 February 1980 (aged 79) Budapest, Hungary

Sport
- Sport: Long-distance running
- Event: Marathon

József Galambos (27 July 1900 – 6 February 1980) was a Hungarian long-distance runner. He competed in the marathon at the 1928 Summer Olympics.

Galambos won the Košice Peace Marathon four times between 1927 and 1933.
