= Lloyd Hales =

English cricketer

Personal information
- Full name: Lloyd Archibald Hales
- Born: 27 June 1921; Leicester, Leicestershire, England
- Died: 12 September 1984 (aged 63); Leicester, Leicestershire, England
- Batting: Right-handed
- Bowling: Right-arm medium Right-arm off break

Domestic team information
- Years: Team
- 1947: Leicestershire

Career statistics
Competition	First-class
Matches	2
Runs scored	76
Batting average	19.00
100s/50s	–/1
Top score	62
Balls bowled	60
Wickets	–
Bowling average	–
5 wickets in innings	–
10 wickets in match	–
Best bowling	–
Catches/stumpings	–/–
- Source: Cricinfo, 4 March 2012

Lloyd Archibald Hales (27 June 1921 – 12 September 1984) was an English cricketer. Hales was a right-handed batsman who bowled both right-arm medium pace and right-arm off break. He was born at Leicester, Leicestershire.

Hales made two first-class appearances for Leicestershire in the 1947 County Championship against Northamptonshire and Warwickshire. In his two first-class appearances, Hales scored a total of 76 runs at an average of 19.00, with his only innings of note, a score of 62, coming against Warwickshire. With the ball, he bowled a total of ten wicketless overs.

He died at the city of his birth on 12 September 1984.
