= Joseph Marien =

Belgian marathon runner

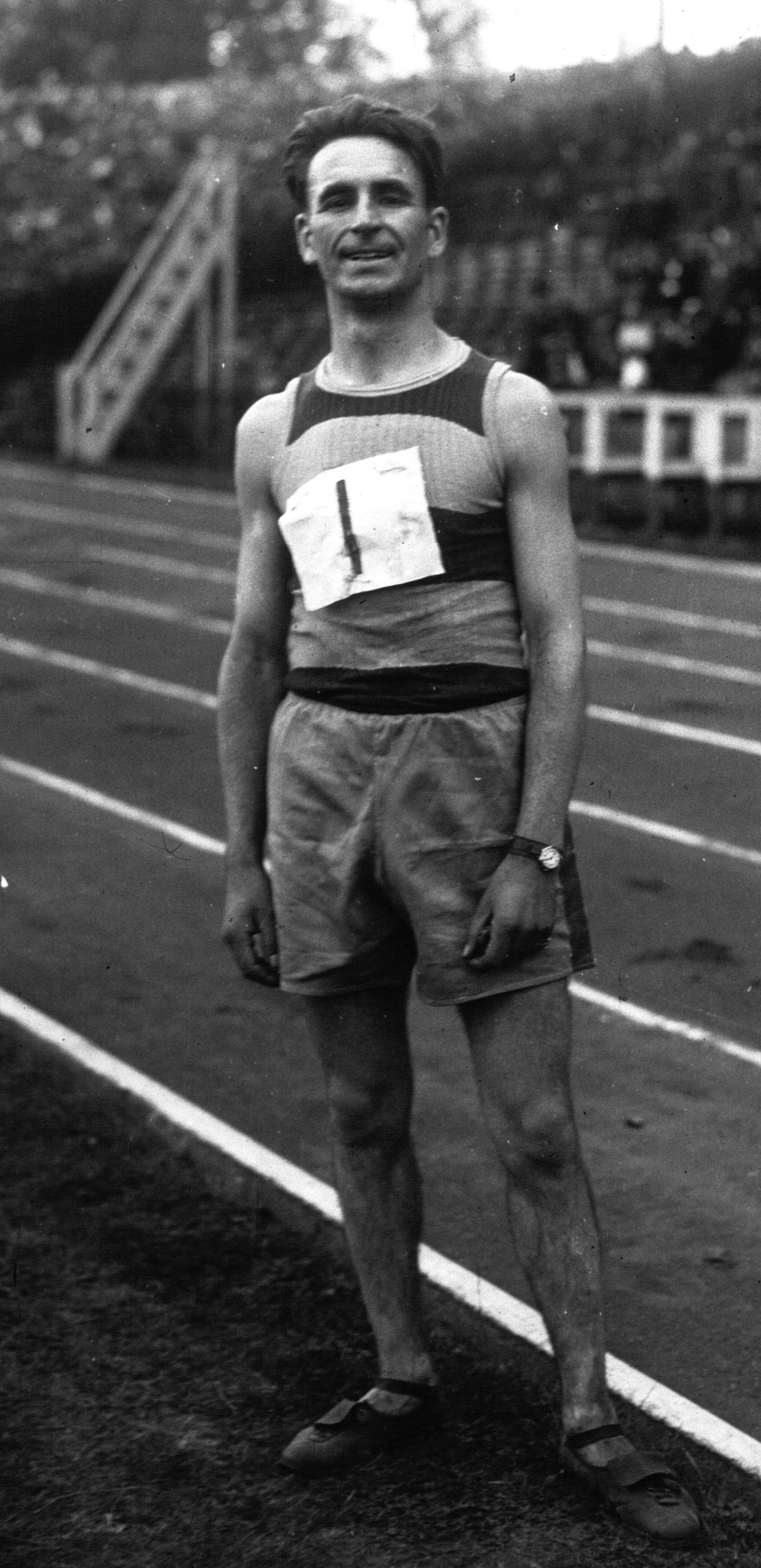
- Joseph Marien in 1926

Personal information
- Born: 25 January 1900
- Died: 14 December 1950 (aged 50)

Sport
- Sport: Athletics
- Event: Marathon

Achievements and titles
- Personal best: Marathon – 2:49:53 (1927)

Joseph Charles Marien (25 January 1900 – 14 December 1950) was a Belgian marathon runner. He competed at the 1928 Summer Olympics and finished in 56th place.
