= Verner Laaksonen =

Finnish long-distance runner

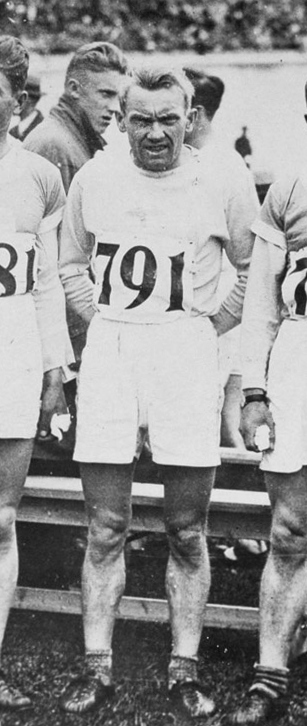
- Laaksonen at the 1928 Olympics

Personal information
- Born: 7 November 1895 Orimattila, Finland
- Died: 10 November 1985 (aged 90) Helsinki, Finland
- Height: 161 cm (5 ft 3 in)
- Weight: 53 kg (117 lb)

Sport
- Sport: Athletics
- Event: marathon
- Club: Helsingin Jyry, Helsinki

Achievements and titles
- Personal best: Marathon – 2:35:21 (1927)

Johan Verner Laaksonen (7 November 1895 – 10 November 1985) was a Finnish long-distance runner. He competed in the marathon at the 1928 Summer Olympics and finished 12th.
