= Paul Hempel =

German long-distance runner (1890–1950)

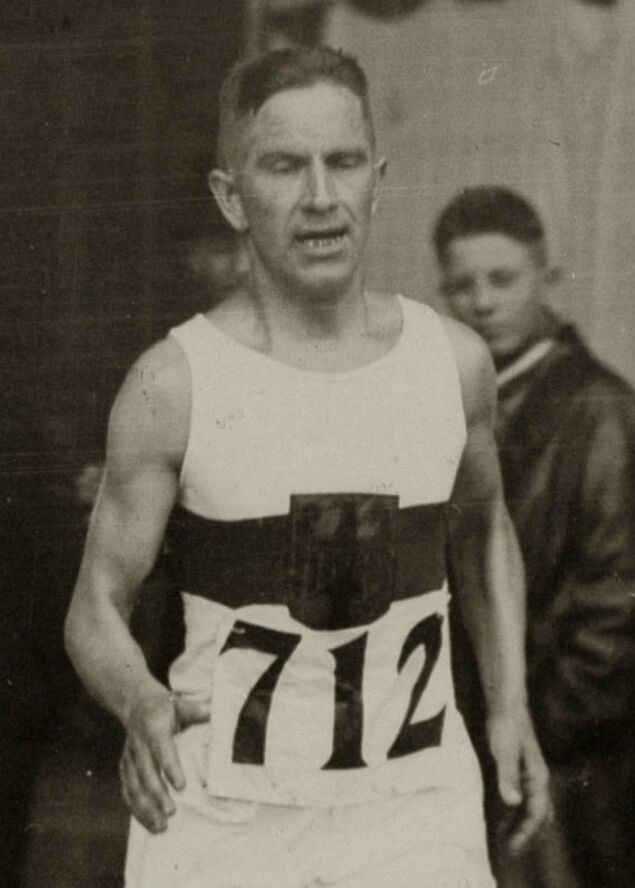
- Hempel in 1928

Personal information
- Nationality: German
- Born: 30 June 1890 Berlin, Germany
- Died: 25 January 1950 (aged 59) Berlin, Germany

Sport
- Sport: Long-distance running
- Event: Marathon

Paul Hempel (30 June 1890 – 25 January 1950) was a German long-distance runner. He competed in the marathon at the 1928 Summer Olympics, finishing 31st.
