= Percy Wyer =

Canadian long-distance runner

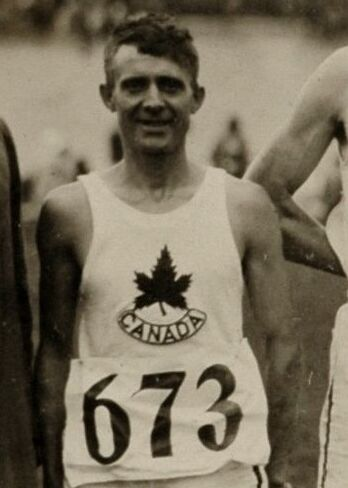
- Percy Wyer in 1928

Personal information
- Nationality: Canadian
- Born: 23 January 1884 Lye, England
- Died: 12 June 1965 (aged 81) Stourbridge, England

Sport
- Sport: Long-distance running
- Event: Marathon

Percy Wyer (23 January 1884 – 12 June 1965) was a Canadian long-distance runner. He competed in the marathon at the 1928 Summer Olympics and the 1936 Summer Olympics.
