= Rebecca Tanui =

Kenyan long-distance runner

Personal information
- Full name: Rebecca Sirwanei Tanui
- Nationality: Kenyan
- Born: June 16, 1992 (age 34)

Sport
- Sport: Athletics
- Event: Marathon

Rebecca Sirwanei Tanui (born 16 June 1992) is a Kenyan long-distance runner who specializes in the marathon. She has achieved podium finishes at major international road races and holds the course record at the Košice Peace Marathon.

== Career ==
She won the 2022 San Sebastián Marathon in a new course record of 2:23:09 hours and she won the 2023 Venice Marathon.

In October 2024, Tanui won the Košice Peace Marathon in Slovakia, breaking a long-standing course record with a time of 2:21:08. The win remained her personal best that year.

Earlier in her career, Tanui finished fourth at the 2022 Vienna City Marathon. She returned to Vienna in 2024 and improved her placement, taking third in 2:26:53. In the lead-up to the 2025 Vienna City Marathon, Tanui was identified by multiple outlets as the top challenger to defending champion Vibian Chepkirui. Analysts noted that her personal best from Košice was just seconds off Chepkirui's Vienna course record of 2:20:59.

== Personal bests ==
- Marathon – 2:21:08 (Košice, 2024)
